= Star Awards 1996 =

Singaporean television awards

- Date: 23 June 1996
- Location: World Trade Centre Harbour Pavilion, Singapore
- Hosted by: Guo Liang; Yvette Tsui

Television/radio coverage
- Network: Television Corporation of Singapore Channel 8
- Produced by: Lin Peiqin; Wen Shusen
- Directed by: Li Yiwen

Star Awards 1996 is the third edition of the annual Star Awards presented by the Television Corporation of Singapore to honour its artistes who work on Channel 8. A total of 21 awards were given out at the ceremony and saw the introduction of two new categories, namely "Top Rated Drama Serial" and "Top Rated Telemovie", while the categories "Most Popular Male Artiste" and "Most Popular Female Artiste" were discontinued.

== Winners and nominees ==
Winners are listed first and highlighted in boldface.

Special Achievement Award
**Bai Yan**	
Best Drama Serial	Best Telemovie
**Tofu Street**; Morning Express; The Last Rhythm; The Teochew Family; The Golden Pillow	**Heart of the Family**; Ace Cops; Cupid Love; Somewhere in Time; To Madam With Love
Top Rated Drama Serial	Top Rated Telemovie
**The Golden Pillow**	**Love Knows No Bound**
Best Actor	Best Actress
**Xie Shaoguang − The Last Rhythm as Senchun Junxiong**; Chen Hanwei — Morning Express as Fang Ansheng; Chew Chor Meng — The Teochew Family as Hong San; Huang Yiliang — Ace Cops as Wu Xifa; Li Nanxing — Somewhere in Time as Li Xiong	**Zoe Tay − The Golden Pillow as Zhou Xiaodan**; Cynthia Koh — Tofu Street as Liang Simei; Aileen Tan — Ace Cops as Yao Jingjing; Fann Wong — The Unbroken Cycle as Ye Qin / Zhu Zhiyue / Li Xiangmei; Zeng Huifen — Dr Justice 2 as Shen Xishuang
Best Supporting Actor	Best Supporting Actress
**Xie Shaoguang − The Golden Pillow as Sai Wei**; Ang Puay Heng — Dr Justice 2 as He Yongli; Zhang Xinxiang — The Golden Pillow as Zhou Hongsheng; Zheng Geping — Tofu Street as Wang A-xiong; Zhu Houren — The Teochew Family as Fu Guobing	**Zeng Huifen − The Teochew Family as Cai Chuning**; Chen Huihui — Tofu Street as Auntie Wonton; Hong Huifang — The Teochew Family as Sun Fengyu; Li Yinzhu — Waves of Courage as Liang Peiyun; Yang Libing — The Golden Pillow as Jinqiu
Top 5 Most Popular Male Artistes	Top 5 Most Popular Female Artistes
**Li Nanxing**; **Chen Hanwei**; **Thomas Ong**; **Chew Chor Meng**; **Xie Shaoguang**	**Zoe Tay**; **Chen Liping**; **Fann Wong**; **Lina Ng**; **Ann Kok**
Most Popular Newcomer	Most Popular Theme or Interlude Song
**Phyllis Quek**; Christopher Lee; Ziozio Lim; Ix Shen; Jacelyn Tay	**"Moonlight in the City 城里的月光" (from Tofu Street);** **Performed by: Mavis Hee**
