= The Teochew Family =

- 潮州家族
- Genre: Historical, Family Drama
- Created by: Cheng Jieyin (程洁茵)
- Written by: Koh Teng Liang (许声亮)
- Starring: Kenneth Tsang; Zeng Huifen; Zoe Tay; Chew Chor Meng; Chen Shucheng
- Opening theme: 潮水的诺言 by Jacky Cheung
- Ending theme: 爱和承诺 by Jacky Cheung and Priscilla Chan
- Country of origin: Singapore
- Original languages: Mandarin, Teochew
- No. of episodes: 30

Production
- Executive producers: Chua Swan (蔡萱); Zeng Haowen (曾皓文）
- Production locations: Singapore; Chaozhou, Guangdong, China
- Running time: 45－48 min

Original release
- Release: 8 August – 18 September 1995

Related
- The Dragons Five 飞龙五将; Sparks of Life 生命火花

The Teochew Family (Chinese: 潮州家族) is a 1995 Singaporean television series produced by Television Corporation of Singapore and Fujian TV. The series follows the trials and tribulations of the Teochew Cai Family under the patriarch Cai Qingyang, portrayed by Kenneth Tsang, from the late 1940s to the 1990s. The series also starred Zoe Tay, Chew Chor Meng and Zeng Huifen,

== Plot ==
The Teochew Family tells the story of Chaozhou rice merchant Cai Qingyang, owns Tai Feng Zhan (泰丰栈). Cai has two brothers, one of them who died early. Another is the useless playboy Cai Qingan. Cai also has a sister, Cai Chuning, who is a female scholar and a teacher. Cai Qingyang decides to arrange a marriage between his second brother's widow with a poor scholar Xiao Denglong, who turns out to be Chuning's lover. Chuning tries to get Denglong to leave Chaozhou with her, but Denglong declines. Chuning then argues with her brother, and leaves Chaozhou alone.

In the late 1940s, the Chinese Civil War was about to break out, rice prices were going up, and there was severe flooding in Chaozhou. Cai Qingyang realises that his business might collapse soon and for his own family's sake. Cai leaves for Nanyang (Later known as Singapore) and would later reunite with his sister. Chuning has a new fiancee, the Hainanese Sailor Fu Yongbing. Qingyang decides to work with Yongbing to smuggle goods during the Korean War. Qingyang succeeds and manages to get some money to reopen his rice business. Great successes need great sacrifices, Yongbing was killed by the pirates in one trip. This causes Chuning to be furious at Qingyang, and she vows to never forgive him for his death. Chuning also adopted Yongbing's godson Hong San. Hong San however has a brain tumour that causes him to collapse, Chuning knowing that she would never have enough money to pay for Hong San's condition begs Qingyang to help Hong San. Qingyang, who had felt guilty over Yongbing's death agrees. Soon, Qingyang manages to bring the whole family down to Singapore except for his wife Zhang Yalan who stayed to protect the ancestral home.

As Cai continues to expand his business over the years to become the rice tycoon, the drama then turns its attention to the second generation with the romances of Cai Meina, Qingyang's niece and Hong San, Cai Chongwu and Mai Xiaodong.

As the years go by, Cai Qingyang suffers multiple tragedies, the death of his eldest son Cai Chongwen, his son Chongwu gone mad, Qingyang now has to fight with Meina, who has decided to change the way the family business is being run, to keep up with the times.

== Cast ==
=== Cai Family ===
- Jin Yinji as Old Mrs Cai (Mother of Cai Qingyang)
- Kenneth Tsang as Cai Qingyang
- Li Yinzhu as Zhang Yalan
- Wang Changli as Cai Qingan
- Hong Huifang as Sun Fengyu
- Chen Shucheng as Xiao Denglong
- Zeng Huifen as Cai Chuning
- Wu Kaishen as Cai Chongwen
- Huang Shuyun as Ding Yueer
- Collin Chee as Cai Chongwu
- Zoe Tay as Cai Meina

=== Others ===
- Chew Chor Meng as Hong San
- Zhang Xinxiang as Lai Youcong
- Zhu Houren as Fu Yongbing
- Lina Ng as Mai Xiaodong
- Hong Peixing as Wang Zhende
- Dai Peng as Four-Eyed Uncle
- Steven Woon as Policeman
- Zhu Yuye as Mrs Mai
- Wu Weiqiang as Mr Mai
- Chen Guohua as Xu Laifu
- Mak Ho Wai as Commissioner

== Production ==
The Teochew Family was a major production by Television Corporation of Singapore and was the first drama serial on a dialect group. It was produced by Chua Swan and written by Hong Kong veteran storyteller Cheng Jieyin (程洁茵) and Singaporean writer Koh Teng Liang (许声亮),

To add authenticity to the show, the drama was filmed in Shantou, Guandong, China. Teochew opera troupe, xiangsheng artistes and a traditional dance and acrobatic troupe were hired as part of the productions.

According to Singaporean author Rong Zi (蓉子), who served as consultant for the show, in her book Tonight I Think Of Singapore, she believed that this was one of Chua Swan's most difficult productions ever.

During filming in China, actor Kenneth Tsang was alleged to be behaving badly by other actors and allegedly "scolded Chinese policemen, beat local children" and refused to toast to county official during a festival dinner. However, Tsang explained that the policemen and children were blocking filming and was only trying to get them out of their work. He also explained he did not toast as he was tired on that night.

== Incident ==
During an interview with Singapore's magazine, RTV Times, Tsang remarked that "Singapore actors are stupid" and Singaporean actors took offence at the remarks and demanded an apology. Tsang claimed it was a joke and that Singaporean actors should take the opportunities to improve themselves when they were working with him. As Tsang was not in Singapore when the interview was published, he later returned to Singapore and offered his apologies during a crew celebration on the drama's high viewership ratings.

== Reception ==
The show was commended for being highly authentic. It was also criticised that the drama might cast the dialect group in a bad light as the patriarch Cai gained his riches through smuggling and certain traditions like a man marrying into his wife's family was not observed in the drama. It was also noted that throughout the series that it felt fake as characters called each other in dialect but switching to Mandarin for their conversations.

== Legacy ==
The Teochew Family remains one of the classic TCS Dramas, despite not receiving any nomination at the Star Awards 25th Anniversary Show for the top 5 best dramas. The Teochew Family's ratings and critical success led to TCS to produce two more other dialect group-related Dramas which are Hainan Kopi Tales and The Guest People. The Teochew Family was also known to have the distinction of having Cantopop singer Jacky Cheung to sing the theme song. The show is also popular with audiences in China for the show's depiction of the troubled romances between Hong San and Cai Meina, alongside Cai Chuning and Fu Yongbing and its accurate depiction of the Teochew culture.

== Accolades ==
The Teochew Family was a great ratings and critical success for TCS, many have praised The Teochew Family for its high production values, accurate depiction of Teochew culture and also the actors performances. However, during the annual Star Awards, the drama faced competition from other blockbuster dramas such as Tofu Street and The Golden Pillow. The drama serial received four nominations in the acting categories and also for Best Drama Serial. Chew Chor Meng was nominated for Best Actor, Zhu Houren was nominated for Best Supporting Actor, Zeng Huifen and Hong Huifang was nominated for Best Supporting Actress. Tofu Street eventually won the Best Drama Serial award and Zeng won the Best Supporting Actress award for her performance as Cai Chuning.

Organisation	Year	Category	Nominee	Result	Ref
Star Awards	1996	Best Actor	Chew Chor Meng (as Hong San)	Nominated	
Star Awards	1996	Best Supporting Actor	Zhu Houren (as Fu Yongbing)	Nominated	
Star Awards	1996	Best Supporting Actress	Zeng Huifen (as Cai Chuning)	Won	
Star Awards	1996	Best Supporting Actress	Hong Huifang (as Sun Fengyu)	Nominated	
Star Awards	1996	Best Drama Serial	—N/a	Nominated	
