= Happy World (TV series) =

- 多多富贵多多情
- Genre: Drama
- Starring: Li Nanxing; Aileen Tan; Zeng Huifen; Cao Jianping
- Country of origin: Singapore
- Original language: Mandarin
- No. of seasons: 1
- No. of episodes: 25

Original release
- Network: SBC Channel 8
- Release: December 3, 1990 – January 28, 1991

Happy World (Chinese: 多多富贵多多情) is a Singaporean Chinese-language drama series. The series stars Li Nanxing, Aileen Tan, Zeng Huifen and Cao Jianping. It revolves around three families who live and work in an amusement park.

== Cast ==
- Li Nanxing as Wang Baiwan
- Aileen Tan as Zhen Meili
- Zeng Huifen as Yang Baoyi
- Cao Jianping
- Fang Hui
- Tony Kim
- Ang Puay Heng
- Song Lihua
- Zhang Jinhua
- Chen Meng
- Zeng Sipei
- Tang Miaoling
- Zeng Yaofeng
- Zhu Li
- Steven Woon
- Tan Mui Kwang
- Anson Khoo
- Wu Qiuyi
- Lin Jinchi
- Huang Qingqi
- Yang Tianfu
- Richard Low as Tang Jinju
- Dai Peng
- Zhong Shurong
- Li Yinzhu as Xiao Tongluo's mother
- Wu Chen
- Xie Shaoguang
- Wang Songshen
- Tiow Im Tan
- Liang Weidong
- Weng Ruiyun
- Liang Baozhu
- Bai Yan
- Zeng Xi'an
- Lan Qinran
- Cai Shiling
- Yang Weiguang
- Tang Wentao
- Li Jianhan
- Chen Zhiguang
- Zhuo Mingshun
- Zhu Houren
- Edmund Chen

== Reception ==
The series received a positive review in the Lianhe Zaobao.
