= Kok Len Shoong =

Singaporean television producer

Kok Len Shoong (Chinese: 郭令送) is a Singaporean television producer. During her tenure at Mediacorp, she won the Star Awards for Best Drama Series seven times as an executive producer. She was later promoted to Senior Vice President of Content Production at Mediacorp.

In 2014, Kok resigned from the company and subsequently withdrew from public view.

== Career ==
In 1979, Kok joined the Singapore Broadcasting Corporation (the predecessor of Mediacorp) as a television news reporter. In 1986, she transferred to the Chinese Drama Department and was promoted to a director a year later.

In 1995, Kok was promoted to executive producer. During her tenure as executive producer, her works Chronicle of Life, Tofu Street, The Price of Peace, Stand By Me, Stepping Out, Beautiful Connection, and Holland V won the Star Awards for Best Drama Series a total of seven times.

In 2000, Kok was promoted to Assistant Vice President at Mediacorp.In 2001, SPH MediaWorks launched Channel U, becoming Mediacorp's main competitor. During the period when the two broadcasters coexisted, Kok assisted Mediacorp's then Chief Operating Officer Chang Long Jong in competing against Channel U by producing long-form drama series centered on family ethics and social values, such as Holland V, Double Happiness, and Portrait of Home. These productions gained strong support from housewives and strengthened Mediacorp's competitive advantage in the competition for television ratings.

By 2003, when Kok took charge of the Chinese Drama Department, she had already been promoted to Vice President. During her leadership of the drama division, she placed significant trust in executive producer Chia Mien Yang, assigning her many flagship productions, including The Little Nyonya (2008). When The Little Nyonya aired, it achieved the highest television ratings in Singapore in 15 years and became one of the country's most internationally recognized television drama productions. In 2011, Kok was promoted to Senior Vice President.

In February 2014, Chia resigned. In April of the same year, Doreen Neo, Senior Vice President of Programme Production and Chinese Variety at Mediacorp, was promoted to Executive Managing Director and assumed oversight of the drama division. After taking office, Neo reorganized the drama department into two teams, led respectively by Kok and newly promoted executive Paul Yuen, placing the two teams in direct competition.

In August 2014, Kok unexpectedly resigned from Mediacorp, a move that surprised many industry insiders. She subsequently withdrew from public view.

== Personal life ==
When Kok was interviewed in 2008, she was single. In 2014, Kok's mother passed away.

== Filmography ==
As Executive Producer
Year	Programme title	Ref.
1995	Chronicle of Life	
1996	Tofu Street	
1997	The Price of Peace	
1998	Stand By Me	
1999	Stepping Out	
2000	Angel's Dream	
2001	The Reunion	
2001	You Light Up My Life	
2002	Beautiful Connection	
2003	Holland V	
