= Legend of the Eight Immortals =

- Poster
- Traditional Chinese: 東遊記
- Simplified Chinese: 东游记
- Hanyu Pinyin: Dōng Yóu Jì
- Genre: Chinese mythology fiction
- Based on: Journey to the East by Wu Yuantai
- Screenplay by: Lu Zhiming; Li Yanping; Huang Jinhua; Xie Junyuan
- Directed by: Edmund Tse; Zhang Baolian; Huo Zhikai; Yuan Guowei; Leung Sing-kuen; Luo Ting
- Starring: Steve Ma; Phyllis Quek; Jacelyn Tay; Jerry Chang; Yvonne Lim
- Theme music composer: Lin Yi-hsin; Xiong Tianping
- Opening theme: "Carefree Travel" (逍遥游) performed by Wu Jiaming
- Country of origin: Singapore
- Original language: Mandarin
- No. of episodes: 30

Production
- Executive producers: Li Daming; Zhou Qiang
- Producers: Ma Jiajun; Zheng Ning; Cheng Xinmin; Edmund Tse
- Production locations: Singapore; Malaysia; China
- Editors: Jiang Jianhua; Xie Jinmei
- Running time: 45 minutes per episode
- Production companies: TCS; Sichuan TV Drama Production Centre; Jiangsu World Film and Television Production Centre

Original release
- Network: TCS Eighth Frequency
- Release: 26 November 1998 – 6 January 1999

Legend of the Eight Immortals is a Singaporean television series based on stories about the Eight Immortals in Chinese mythology and adapted from the 16th-century Chinese novel Journey to the East (东游记) by Wu Yuantai (吴元泰). Produced by the Television Corporation of Singapore (TCS; now MediaCorp) in collaboration with two mainland Chinese companies, the series had cast members from Singapore, Taiwan, Hong Kong and mainland China. It was first aired in Singapore on TCS Channel 8 from 26 November 1998 to 6 January 1999.

== Plot ==
The Universe is under threat by a demonic cult led by Tongtian Jiaozhu. The Jade Emperor, the supreme ruler of Heaven, orders Immortal Donghua to find seven other worthy beings and form a team known as the Eight Immortals to counter the cult. After the first five members – Tieguai Li, Han Zhongli, Zhang Guolao, Lan Caihe and He Xiangu – have joined, Donghua chooses to undergo reincarnation to help the remaining two members – Han Xiangzi and Cao Guojiu – achieve immortality faster. He is reincarnated as Lü Dongbin and serves as the team leader. However, he has to overcome his romantic entanglements with Peony Fairy because romance between immortals is forbidden by Heaven's laws. At one point, Tongtian Jiaozhu implants a "blood curse" in Lü Dongbin which causes the latter to lose control of his senses and go rogue. Tongtian Jiaozhu is later betrayed and killed by his treacherous follower, Pangolin, who absorbs his powers. Pangolin, who has a crush on He Xiangu, cleverly manipulates the Eight Immortals and causes them to turn against each other and sow discord between them and other deities. The Eight Immortals combine their strengths to defeat Pangolin and the evil forces and bring peace to the Universe.

== Cast ==
Eight Immortals

- Steve Ma as Lü Dongbin, the leader of the Eight Immortals.
  - Ma also portrayed Immortal Donghua, Lü Dongbin's previous avatar. He voluntarily undergoes reincarnation into the human world to find the remaining immortals-to-be and help them attain immortality faster.
- Jacelyn Tay as He Xiangu, an apprentice of Jiutian Xuannü and Guanyin.
- Jerry Chang as Han Xiangzi, Han Yu's nephew.
  - Chang also portrayed Fei Zhangfang, Han Xiangzi's previous avatar. He was very filial to his mother but extremely impulsive and stubborn.
- Deborah Sim as Lan Caihe, a street performer who becomes an immortal with Sun Wukong's help. He was the Barefoot Immortal in his previous life.
- Ling Xiao as Zhang Guolao, an eccentric Taoist who becomes an immortal after consuming rare herbs.
- Lin Yisheng as Tieguai Li, an apprentice of Taishang Laojun and the first to join the team.
- Mak Hiu-wai as Han Zhongli, a former Han dynasty general who becomes an immortal with Donghua's help.
  - Hong Junrui as the Cowherd Boy, Han Zhongli's previous avatar. He was sent to be reincarnated into the human world as punishment after carelessly allowing Taishang Laojun's divine bull to escape and cause trouble.
- Li Haijie as Cao Guojiu, the maternal uncle of a Song dynasty emperor and the last to join the team.

Others

- Phyllis Quek as Bai Mudan, a maiden whom Lü Dongbin is destined to have romantic entanglements with. She becomes an obstacle to his quest to unite the Eight Immortals because he is forced to choose between his romance with her and his allegiance to his team.
  - Quek also portrayed Peony Fairy, Bai Mudan's previous avatar. She has a crush on Immortal Donghua and was banished to the human world for breaking Heaven's laws.
- Yvonne Lim as Long San, the Dragon King's third daughter who is revealed later to be actually an offspring of the Evil Dragon and Chunying. She has a crush on Han Xiangzi and transforms herself to look like Zhenniang.
  - Lim also portrayed Zhenniang, Fei Zhangfang's mute but virtuous wife.
- Xie Shaoguang as Pangolin, a treacherous demon who has a crush on He Xiangu. He betrays Tongtian Jiaozhu, absorbs his powers, and commit several atrocities in his attempt to destroy Lü Dongbin and the other Immortals and have He Xiangu for himself.
- Hong Huifang as Chunying, the widow of the Evil Dragon and Long San's mother. She used to be one of Tongtian Jiaozhu's deputies and committed several wicked deeds in her bid to kill Lü Dongbin and avenge her husband. However, she repents after she is touched by her daughter's filial piety and returns to the path of goodness.
- Tracer Wong as Tree Demoness, one of Tongtian Jiaozhu's deputies. She has an affair with Pangolin.
- Huang Shinan as Tongtian Jiaozhu, Taishang Laojun's evil junior who formed a demonic cult to challenge Heaven.
- Vincent Ng as Sun Wukong, the protagonist in Journey to the West who is now known as the "Fighting Victorious Buddha" after completing the quest to obtain the Buddhist scriptures. He is a friend and ally of the Eight Immortals.
  - Ng also portrayed Sun Ying, the Six Eared Macaque's son and Sun Wukong's apprentice. He has a crush on Long San and relentlessly tries to win her heart.
- Ding Lan as Guanyin, the Bodhisattva of compassion and mercy. She shows up to help the Immortals when they are in desperate situations.
- Yang Dawei as Jade Emperor, the supreme ruler and patriarch of Heaven.
- Li Yinzhu as Queen Mother of Heaven, the matriarch of Heaven.
- Dai Peng as Taishang Laojun, one of the Three Pure Ones.
- Yan Bingliang as Dragon King of the East Sea, the ruler of all marine beings in the East Sea.
- Wang Yanbin as Erlang Shen, the three-eyed warrior deity who serves as a general under the Jade Emperor.
- Hong Shihu as Dragon Crown Prince, the Dragon King's eldest son.
- Chen Tianwen as the Evil Dragon who is slain by Immortal Donghua in the opening scene.
- Zhou Quanxi as Turtle Premier, the premier of the Dragon King's marine kingdom.
- Zheng Youguo portrayed the Buddha, who shows up to help the Immortals when they are in danger.
- Wang Xiuyun as Fei Zhangfang's mother
- Yang Yue as Yama, the ruler of the Underworld.
- Wu Kai Shen as Green Ox / Divine Bull, a mischievous mythical being who caused trouble and aligned with Pangolin in the first few episodes. Captured by Han ZhongLi and brought back to Heaven

== Accolades ==
Organisation	Year	Award	Nominee	Result	Ref
Star Awards	1999	Best Drama Serial	—N/a	Nominated	

== See also ==
- Eight Immortals
