= Zero to Hero =

Zero to Hero may refer to:

- Hercules: Zero to Hero, 1999 American animated film
- "Zero to Hero", a song in Hercules, the soundtrack to the 1997 film, Hercules
- Zero to Hero (TV series), 2005 Singaporean TV series
- Zero to Hero (film), 2021 Hong Kong drama film
