= Facing the Music (TV series) =

1998 Singaporean television series

- Title card
- Traditional Chinese: 鋼琴88
- Simplified Chinese: 钢琴88
- Literal meaning: "Piano 88"
- Hanyu Pinyin: Gāngqín 88
- Genre: Drama; Romance; Musical
- Screenplay by: Wang Yinghong
- Story by: Lu Huilin
- Directed by: Wang Youhong
- Starring: Ann Kok; Auguste Kwan; Ling Xiao; Hong Huifang; Michelle Chia; Vincent Ng; Lynn Poh
- Opening theme: "Hand Me Over to You" by Ann Kok and Auguste Kwan
- Ending theme: 1) "Awaiting For You to Be By My Side" by Ann Kok; 2) "Still in Dreams" by Auguste Kwan
- Country of origin: Singapore
- Original language: Mandarin
- No. of seasons: 1
- No. of episodes: 20

Production
- Executive producer: Yuan Zaixian
- Cinematography: Hong Meilian; Huang Niuhua; Huang Guozhong
- Editor: Lai Zhenjiang
- Running time: approx. 50 minutes
- Production company: Mediacorp

Original release
- Network: Channel 8
- Release: 2 March 1998 – 1998

Facing the Music (Chinese: 钢琴88) is a 1998 Singaporean romantic drama series starring Ann Kok, Auguste Kwan, Ling Xiao, Hong Huifang, Michelle Chia, Vincent Ng and Lynn Poh. It premiered on Mediacorp Channel 8 on 2 March 1998 at 9pm local time.

== Cast ==
- Ann Kok as Yu Kaidi
- Auguste Kwan as Shuai Yibin
- Michelle Chia as Xia Ni
- Ling Xiao as Yu Chong
- Hong Huifang as Ma Mimi
- Vincent Ng as Huang Qiguang
- Lynn Poh as Wu Lihua
- Chen Huihui as Huang Yanyan
- Hong Junrui as Yu Kaige
- Dai Peng as Wu Guangzhou
- Chen Zhiguang as Wu Darong
- Hong Peixing as Xie Zijian
- He Junjie as Wu Jincai
- Chen Yiwen as Wu Aiqin
- Magayson as Samy
- Lakhjit Kaur as Rita
- Amritraj Singh as Vasso
- Fu Guoquan as Xie Junming
- Anna Lim as Weng Lailai
- Chen Meiguang as Dong A-hao
- He Qitang as Li Zhanhong
- Ding Lan as Cindy
- Li Haijie as Shuai Zhili
- Huang Peiru as Fang Lisheng
- Sun Yuhui as Sally
- Zhang Yunhong as May
- Guan Xuemei as Neighbour A

== Production ==
Some of the exterior scenes were filmed at Block 63, Lorong 4 Toa Payoh.

Lead actor Ling Xiao reportedly earned around S$300.00 per episode, and S$6,000 in total for the series.

== Accolades ==
Organisation	Year	Category	Nominee(s)	Result	Ref
Star Awards	1998	Best Supporting Actress	Facing the Music (as Ma Mimi)	Nominated	
