= Hong Huifang =

Singaporean actress (born 1961)

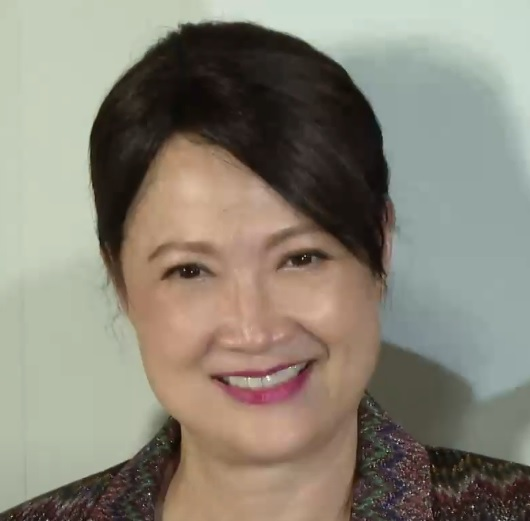
- Hong in November 2022
- Born: Ang Hwee Fong; 7 January 1961 (age 65); Singapore
- Occupation: Actress
- Years active: 1982–present
- Spouse: Zheng Geping (m. 1993)
- Children: Tay Ying; Calvert Tay
- Awards: Golden Horse Awards 2022: Best Leading Actress Nominee; Star Awards 1997: Best Supporting Actress; Star Awards 2006: Best Supporting Actress

Chinese name
- Chinese: 洪慧芳
- Hanyu Pinyin: Hóng Huìfāng

Hong Huifang (born Ang Hwee Fong on 7 January 1961) is a Singaporean actress.

In 2022, Hong became the first Singaporean actress to be nominated for Best Leading Actress at Taiwan's Golden Horse Awards, for her performance in the film Ajoomma.

== Career ==
Hong joined the Singapore Broadcasting Corporation during the mid-1980s after completing the 5th drama training course alongside Yang Libing and Chen Tianwen, at age 22. She is perhaps best known by her generation for starring in Samsui Women and her role as Wang Jinfeng in The Price of Peace, for which she won her first acting award. In 2009, she starred in the highly rated drama Housewives' Holiday and earned a surprise Best Actress nomination. At the Star Awards 2010, Hong became the only artiste to earn nomination for three awards: Best Actress (Housewives' Holiday), Best Supporting Actress (Together) and Top 10 Most Popular Female Artistes.

Hong has won 1 Top 10 Most Popular Female Artistes award in 2019.

== Personal life ==
Hong is married to actor Zheng Geping. They have a daughter and a son, Tay Ying and Calvert Tay, who also joined the local media scene.

== Filmography ==
=== Television series ===
Year	Title	Role	Notes	Ref.
1984	Youth (年轻人 之《南游记》&《金缕衣》)	Hong Bizhen / Woman		
1985	Tycoon (豪门内外)			
1985	Takeover (人在旅途)	Liang Yunru		
1985	The Coffee Shop (咖啡乌)			
1986	Samsui Women	Dai Ah Xiu		
1986	First Step (踏上征途)	Luo Lijun		
1986	Crossroads (红绿灯之《黄昏》)	Janet		
1986	The Sword and The Song (绝代双雄)	Tao Sanchun		
1987	Neighbours (芝麻绿豆)			
1987	Moving On (变迁)	Chen Aizhen		
1987	Pickpockets (提防小手)	Gan Yuqin		
1988	Silk and Satin (云想衣裳)	Tian Xiuwen		
1988	The Golden Quest (金麒麟)	Liang Meiyu		
1988	Mystery (迷离夜 之《魂》)	Tian Yuxiang		
1988	We Are Family (四代同堂)			
1988	Ups and Downs (婚姻保险)	Liu Yuping		
1989	Good Morning, Sir!	Zhang Caiqin		
1989	Turn Of The Tide (浮沉)	Bao Liping		
1990	Finishing Line	Herself	Cameo	
1990	Two Of Us (天生一对)	Guan Shaoling		
1990	Marry Me (最佳配偶)	Chen Fengjiao		
1991	Working Class (上班一族)			
1991	Pretty Face (三面夏娃)	Zhuo Silng		
1992	Women Of Substance (悲欢岁月)	Yao Baoling		
1992	The Dating Game (爱情乒乓球)	Lin Meiqiu		
1992	Memories Of June (六月的童话)	Chen Hui		
1992	Love Is In The Air (爱在女儿乡)	Lin Aihua		
1992	Mystery II (迷离夜II 之《是非勿语》)	Shen Yulian		
1993	The Young & The Restless (俏皮战士)	Fan Yayun		
1993	Switch (妙鬼临门)	Chang Mei-e		
1993	The Unbeatables	Qiu Huaifeng		
1994	Young Justice Bao (侠义包公)	Shan Hu		
1994	Shadow In The Dark (一号凶宅)	Hong Jiamei		
1994	The Magnate (叱吒风云)	Deputy Prosecutor		
1994	Silk And Romance (情丝万缕)	Bao Wenxi		
1995	Dream Hunters (追心一族)	Ye Zhen		
1995	The Teochew Family	Sun Fengyu		
1995	Morning Express II (阳光列车II)			
1995	Dr Justice II (法医故事II 之《血在烧》)	Li Qiaozhu		
1996	Ah Xue (阿雪)			
1996	Full House (不速之客)	Liu Zhi		
1997	Time After Time (我来自1997)	Huang Jinzhi		
1997	The Price Of Peace	Wang Jinfeng		
1997	From The Medical Files (医生档案)	Wang Jiaxin		
1997	Curtain Call (大锣大鼓)	Lin Lianye		
1998	Right Frequency	Bai Suqin (Madam Bai)		
1998	Legend of the Eight Immortals	Chun Ying		
1998	Facing the Music	Ma Mimi		
1999	Mr OK (OK先生)	Jin Baozuan		
1999	Right Frequency II	Bai Suqin (Madam Bai)		
2000	Right Frequency III	Bai Suqin (Madam Bai)		
2000	The Legendary Swordsman	Ning Zhongze		
2001	You Light Up My Life (如何对你说)	Ye Mingzhu		
2001	Story of Ah-Can (阿灿正传)	Mei Ying		
2001	The Hotel (大酒店)	Gong Jingfang		
2001	The Reunion (顶天立地)	Anne Yeo		
2002	Health Matters (一切由慎开始 之《我苦、我哭》)	Huang Yaying		
2002	Viva La Famillie (好儿好女)	Zeng Shiyun		
2003	Lobang King (我是Lobang King)			
2003	Viva La Famillie II (好儿好女 II)	Pan Jinlian (Gu-gu)		
2003	A Hope of Tomorrow (孩有明天)	Lin Peijin		
2003	Baby Boom (我家四个宝)	Cai Jingwen		
2003	A Toast Of Love (吃吃面包谈谈情)	Pan Jinlian (Gu-gu)		
2004	The Crime Hunters (心网追凶)			
2004	Double Happiness I	Luo Kaiyin		
2004	Double Happiness II	Luo Kaiyin		
2004	I Love My Home (我爱我家)	Huang Huixia		
2005	The Palm Of Rulai (如来神掌})	Liu Piaopiao		
2005	Love Concerige (爱的掌门人)	Weng Yuxiang		
2006	The Shining Star	Pei Pei		
2006	Lady of Leisure (闲妻靓母)	Chantel		
2006	Rhapsody in Blue	Cai Guiying		
2006	Through It All (海的儿子)	Cen Baohui		
2006	An Enchanted Life (钻石情缘)	Liu Yuhan		
2007	My Dear Kins (亲本家人)	Zhang Fenglai		
2007	Let It Shine (萤火虫的梦)	Felicia		
2007	Kinship (手足)	Ying Lishi		
2007	Honour and Passion (宝家卫国)	Liu Yamei		
2007	Metamorphosis (破茧而出)	Ou Yangsu		
2008	Beach.Ball.Babes (球爱大战)	Wen Quanlian		
2008	Love Blossoms (心花朵朵开)	Liang Miaochang		
2009	Housewives' Holiday	Chen Simei		
2009	The Ultimatum	Zheng Wenyu		
2009	Together	He Qiao		
2010	New Beginnings	Li Xiuyun		
2010	The Family Court	Liu Aizhu		
2011	Prosperity	Tang Aixin		
2011	Bountiful Blessings	E-Jie		
2011	Love Thy Neighbour	Ruyi		
2012	It Takes Two	Aunt Kopi		
2012	Poetic Justice	Lin Huifang		
2012	Pillow Talk	Lu Peifen		
2012	Rescue 995	Zhong Lingfeng		
2013	Love At Risk	Fu Meili		
2014	The Caregivers	Aunt Feng		
2014	C.L.I.F. 3	Luo Lulu		
2014	In The Name of Love	Hong Meidai		
2014	Spice Up	Su Feifei		
2014	Against The Tide	Luo Jinzhu		
2015	Good Luck	Lin-He Xiangniang		
2015	Life Is Beautiful	Lin Shaoping		
2015	Super Senior	Hong Caiyun		
2015	Hand In Hand	He Liyun		
2016	Life - Fear Not	Liang Mei-e		
2016	If Only I Could	Li Xiumei		
2017	Home Truly	Lian Jie		
2017	Eat Already? 2	Aunty Yuan		
2017	Legal Eagles	Zhong Caizhen		
2017	When Duty Calls	Zhu Cuihua		
2017	Eat Already? 3	Aunt Yuan		
2018	Eat Already? 4	Aunt Yuan		
2018	Reach For The Skies	Zhu Xiuxia		
2018	Babies On Board	Huang Lifeng		
2018	Gifted	Hu Jinmei		
2018	Say Cheese	Huang Ruiyun		
2019	Hello From The Other Side (阴错阳差)	Chen Ailian		
2019	While You Were Away (一切从昏睡开始)	Liu Lanying		
2020	Recipe of Life (味之道)	Wang Yanfen		
2021	The Peculiar Pawnbroker (人心鉴定师)	Liu Yujuan		
2022	I Want To Be A Towkay (亲家冤家做头家)	Huang Lai		
2022	In Safe Hands (守护星)	Wu Xiumei		
2022	When Duty Calls 2 (卫国先锋2)	Zhu Cuihua		
2022	Healing Heroes (医生不是神)	Song Ruyi		
2023	Strike Gold	Cardboard Granny		
2023	Whatever Will Be, Will Be	Su Fang Fang		
2024	Breeze by the Sea		Taiwanese production	
2025	Decalcomania (ทวิญ) (折影双生)		Singapore-Thai production	
2026	Haunted House Secrets	Bi Yingxueh	Taiwanese production	

=== Film ===
Year	Title	Role	Notes	Ref.
2015	7 Letters	Daughter-in-law	Segment "GPS (Grandma Positioning System)"	
2015	Mr. Unbelievable	Samsui woman		
2022	Ajoomma	Auntie		
2024	Fat Hope			

== Discography ==
=== Compilation albums ===
Year	Title	Ref.
2013	MediaCorp Music Lunar New Year Album 13 (新传媒群星金蛇献祥和)	
2016	MediaCorp Music Lunar New Year Album 16 (新传媒群星金猴添喜庆)	
2017	MediaCorp Music Lunar New Year Album 17 (新传媒群星咕鸡咕鸡庆丰年)	
2018	MediaCorp Music Lunar New Year Album 18 (新传媒群星阿狗狗过好年)	
2019	MediaCorp Music Lunar New Year Album 19 (新传媒群星猪饱饱欢乐迎肥年)	
2020	MediaCorp Music Lunar New Year Album 20 (裕鼠鼠纳福迎春了)	

== Awards and nominations ==
Organisation	Year	Category	Nominated work	Result	Ref.
Star Awards	1996	Best Supporting Actress	The Teochew Family	Nominated	
Star Awards	1997	Best Supporting Actress	The Price of Peace	Won	
Star Awards	1998	Best Supporting Actress	Facing the Music	Nominated	
Star Awards	2000	Best Supporting Actress	Legendary Swordsman	Nominated	
Star Awards	2000	Top 10 Most Popular Female Artistes	—N/a	Nominated	
Star Awards	2003	Best Supporting Actress	Viva La Famillie II	Nominated	
Star Awards	2004	Best Supporting Actress	Double Happiness	Nominated	
Star Awards	2005	Best Supporting Actress	Double Happiness II	Nominated	
Star Awards	2006	Best Supporting Actress	The Shining Star	Won	
Star Awards	2007	Most Memorable Scene	The Price of Peace	Won	
Star Awards	2007	Top 10 Most Popular Female Artistes	—N/a	Nominated	
Star Awards	2009	Top 10 Most Popular Female Artistes	—N/a	Nominated	
Star Awards	2010	Best Actress	Housewives' Holiday	Nominated	
Star Awards	2010	Best Supporting Actress	Together	Nominated	
Star Awards	2010	Top 10 Most Popular Female Artistes	—N/a	Nominated	
Star Awards	2011	Top 10 Most Popular Female Artistes	—N/a	Nominated	
Star Awards	2012	Top 10 Most Popular Female Artistes	—N/a	Nominated	
Star Awards	2013	Top 10 Most Popular Female Artistes	—N/a	Nominated	
Star Awards	2014	Top 10 Most Popular Female Artistes	—N/a	Nominated	
Star Awards	2014	Best Supporting Actress	Love at Risk	Nominated	
Star Awards	2015	Top 10 Most Popular Female Artistes	—N/a	Nominated	
Star Awards	2016	Best Evergreen Artiste	Good Luck	Nominated	
Star Awards	2016	Top 10 Most Popular Female Artistes	—N/a	Nominated	
Star Awards	2017	Best Evergreen Artiste	If Only I Could	Nominated	
Star Awards	2017	Top 10 Most Popular Female Artistes	—N/a	Nominated	
Star Awards	2018	Best Evergreen Artiste	—N/a	Nominated	
Star Awards	2018	Top 10 Most Popular Female Artistes	—N/a	Nominated	
Star Awards	2019	Top 10 Most Popular Female Artistes	—N/a	Won	
Star Awards	2021	Top 10 Most Popular Female Artistes	—N/a	Nominated	
Star Awards	2022	Top 10 Most Popular Female Artistes	—N/a	Nominated	
Star Awards	2023	Best Evergreen Artiste	—N/a	Nominated	
Star Awards	2023	Top 10 Most Popular Female Artistes	—N/a	Nominated	
Star Awards	2024	Best Supporting Actress	Strike Gold	Nominated	
Star Awards	2024	Top 10 Most Popular Female Artistes	—N/a	Nominated	
Golden Horse Film Festival and Awards	2022	Best Leading Actress	Ajoomma	Nominated	
Asian World Film Festival	2022	Best Actress	Ajoomma	Won	
