= Double Happiness II =

- 喜临门 II
- Written by: Ang Eng Tee
- Directed by: Foo Seng Peng; Chong Liung Man (Season 2)
- Starring: Ivy Lee; Xie Shaoguang; Edmund Chen; Vivian Lai; Zhang Wei
- Opening theme: Season 2: 平衡点 sung by Anson Goh
- Country of origin: Singapore
- Original language: Chinese
- No. of episodes: 141

Production
- Producer: Soh Bee Lian
- Running time: approx. 45 minutes

Original release
- Network: MediaCorp Channel 8
- Release: 2004 – 2005

Related
- Double Happiness

Double Happiness II (Chinese: 喜临门 II) is a Singaporean drama series on MediaCorp Channel 8 in Singapore which was broadcast in March 2004 and ended in January 2005. It consists of two parts, with 71 episodes in this part of the show. The series revolves around the Luo family operating a fish and chips restaurant known as Happy Fish located at East Coast Road. It stars Ivy Lee, Xie Shaoguang, Edmund Chen, Vivian Lai and Zhang Wei as the casts for the second installment. The restaurant has its ups and downs, but eventually it will come out strong, but not without tragedies and lessons learned.

== Cast ==
- Ivy Lee as Situ Yaxi
- Xie Shaoguang as Luo Jialong
- Patricia Mok as Su Meili, Jialong's wife
- Xiang Yun as Luo Jiaxi
- Huang Yiliang as Lin Xuezhi, Jiaxi's husband
- Li Xianmin as Lin Wenwen, Jiaxi and Xuezhi's daughter
- Aileen Tan as Luo Jiayu
- Rayson Tan as Huang Yaozu, Jiayu's husband
- Kimberly Wang as Donna, Yaozu and Jiayu's daughter
- Clarence Neo Jia Jun as Patrick, Yaozu and Jiayu's son
- Vivian Lai as Luo Jiaqian
- Edmund Chen as Luo Jiaqi
- Alan Tern as Wenjie/Wenxiong (Dual Role)
- Priscelia Chan as Lin Meijiao, later Shirley
- Jin Yinji as Mrs. Luo/Ah Feng (Dual Role)
- Zhang Wei as Luo Kaijin
- Hong Huifang as Luo Kaiyin, Kaijin's younger sister
- Henry Thia as Gao Ah Peng, Meijiao's former husband
- Jeff Wang as Luo Jiafu
- Chen Tianwen as William
- Yao Wenlong as Tang Jiaming

=== Guest cast ===
- Moses Lim
- Brandon Wong

== Release ==
In 2007, MediaCorp sold the drama's rights to Chinese broadcaster CCTV8 and it was broadcast in China in 4 parts, 2 parts for each season.

== Accolades ==
Ceremony	Year	Category	Nominee(s)	Result	Ref
Star Awards	2005	Young Talent Award	Jason Liang 梁世杰	Won	
Star Awards	2005	Best Supporting Actor	Alan Tern	Nominated	
Star Awards	2005	Best Supporting Actress	Hong Huifang	Nominated	
Star Awards	2005	Best Supporting Actress	Vivian Lai	Nominated	
