= The Guest People =

- 客家之歌
- Starring: Christopher Lee; Chen Hanwei; Xie Shaoguang; Jason Oh; Ann Kok; Jacelyn Tay
- Country of origin: Singapore
- Original languages: Mandarin and small amount of Hakka
- No. of episodes: 30

Original release
- Network: Television Corporation of Singapore (now Mediacorp Channel 8)
- Release: November 11, 1997

The Guest People (Chinese: 客家之歌) is a Singaporean Chinese drama produced by Television Corporation of Singapore (now Mediacorp Channel 8) in 1997.

Set in the 1930s to 1950s, the story is about four young Hakka men who migrated to Singapore from China and were caught in the tumultuous anti-colonial period of the country's history.

It stars Christopher Lee, Chen Hanwei, Xie Shaoguang, Jason Oh, Ann Kok and Jacelyn Tay. Others in the cast include Chen Huihui, Li Yinzhu, Chen Shucheng, Huang Peiru, Mai Hao Wei and Liang Wei Dong.

The drama was nominated for the Best Drama awards at the Asian Television Awards and the New York Television Festival in 1998.

It was dubbed in the Hakka language and broadcast in Taiwan, as well as in China.
