= The Shining Star =

- 星闪闪
- Genre: Family Drama
- Written by: Ang Eng Tee
- Starring: Pierre Png; Dawn Yeoh; Hong Huifang
- Country of origin: Singapore
- Original language: Chinese
- No. of episodes: 20

Production
- Producer: Daisy Chan
- Running time: approx. 45 minutes

Original release
- Network: MediaCorp
- Release: 6 March – 30 March 2006

The Shining Star (Chinese: 星闪闪) is family drama produced by Mediacorp TV Channel 8. The drama made its debut on 6 March 2006 in Singapore, and ended its run on 31 March 2006. It stars Pierre Png, Dawn Yeoh & Hong Huifang as the casts of the series. It encores it's telecast from Monday to Wednesday at 3.30pm in 2018 and on weekends at 7.30am from Feb - Mar 2021.

This show was ranked at 7th position for Year 2006 in terms of viewership ratings and was awarded Best Drama Serial of the year.

== Synopsis ==
A-Li is a very pretty young girl. However she was born visually handicapped and has never known how she looks like, much less her surroundings and the happenings around her. Despite this, she is an optimistic character who never blames anyone, striving instead to be as independent as possible in her daily life, sometimes even going out of her way to help others.

Her own father had abandoned her since young and she followed her mother when she remarried a sloppy and lazy man. The family depend on the declining trade of hand puppetry for their living. Due to this, A-Li has no choice but to search for jobs in order to earn enough to send her half-brother to university.

A father and daughter pair moves into the old block which A-Li is staying. The youthful father refuses to tell people what his name is so A-Li just calls him 'Nameless'. Nameless has a mischievous 8-year-old daughter named Anqi, who together with him, turns the block topsy turvy with their antics. In frustration, A-Li terms her 'little monster'. Anqi retaliates by calling her 'hideous'.

As time went by, A-Li becomes more familiar with the pair and finds out that Nameless was actually born into a wealthy family. He later fell out with his father because he insisted on pursuing music studies in Vienna. Later, he met a girl named Xu Ling and had Anqi with her. However at this point in time, Nameless fell into depression as he was not able to make any progress in his music studies. Things became worse for him when he found out that Xu Ling was having an affair. In anger, he took the month-old daughter with him and left. All these years since then, both father and daughter have depended on each other and share a very close relationship.

Anqi's school results have been disappointing and she is often in trouble, garnering many complaints from parents and classmates alike. In the end, she even gives up going to school. When A-Li finds out about this, she decides to help Anqi find a new school. She even swears to help Anqi realise her potential so that Anqi can prove the teachers and classmates who looked down on her wrong.

Under her tutelage, Anqi's schoolwork makes great progress. While appreciating her help, Nameless also begins to respect her "handicapped but able" spirit. In contrast, his own predicament of living life without goal and taking each day as it comes despite his healthy body is a poor comparison.

Gradually A-Li develops a positive impression towards Nameless. She hopes that he will eventually pick himself up and start afresh, but Nameless has not even finished playing an entire music piece for a long time. A-Li throws herself into thinking of ways to help him regain his confidence.

However, A-Li is suddenly sent to hospital where the doctor discovers many injuries caused by scratches and bites. She is suspected to have been abused and the police is notified immediately. The police is unable to get any further information from A-Li or her mother and thus seeks the help of a social worker Yin Qi. A-Li makes friends very readily with Yin Qi. Yin Qi finds out that A-Li trusting nature makes her very vulnerable to be taken advantage of. In spite of Yin Qi's repeated questioning, A-Li refuses to tell the truth of how she got hurt.

At about this time, Yin Qi is also facing a bottleneck at work, as well as her husband's extramarital affair. Under pressure and in exhaustion, she closes A-Li's case shoddily. It is not till A-Li is once again sent to hospital that she remorsefully takes it upon herself to find out the truth.

Through investigations, Yin Qi finds out many untold truths and hidden facts and in the process learns to face her husband and his infidelity with magnanimity. She also decides to stay on her job.

Meanwhile, A-Li's half brother has been getting into trouble with the local drug trafficker B-ge. Things get nasty when B breaks into their home and gains access by duplicating the house keys.

== Cast ==
=== Main ===
- Dawn Yeoh as Ah-Li 阿黎
- Pierre Png as Ziqing/Nameless 无名

=== Supporting ===
- Rachell Ng Ting Yi as Anqi 安琪
- Zheng Geping as Huang Fei Long 黄飞龙
- May Phua as Yin Qi 殷琦
- Hong Huifang as Pei Pei 佩佩
- Adam Chen as Ah B 阿B
- Zen Chong as Ah Pao 阿炮
- Eelyn Kok as Xu Ling 徐玲
- Constance Song
- Huang Shinan as Jintian 金田
- Wang Yuqing
- Alan Tern
- Rayson Tan as Lora's father
- Kimberly Wang as Lora

== Awards and nominations ==
Organisation	Year	Category	Nominee(s)	Result	Ref
Star Awards	2006	Young Talent Award	Rachell Ng Ting Yi 黄莛贻	Nominated	
Star Awards	2006	Best Theme Song	"触摸" by Kelvin Tan	Won	
Star Awards	2006	Best Screenplay 最佳剧本	Ang Eng Tee	Won	
Star Awards	2006	Best Actor	Pierre Png	Nominated	
Star Awards	2006	Best Supporting Actor	Adam Chen	Nominated	
Star Awards	2006	Best Supporting Actor	Zheng Geping	Nominated	
Star Awards	2006	Best Supporting Actress	Hong Huifang	Won	
Star Awards	2006	Best Drama Serial	—N/a	Won	

== See also ==
- List of programmes broadcast by Mediacorp Channel 8

Preceded by A New Life; 2005	Star Awards for Best Drama Serial; The Shining Star; 2006	Succeeded by Metamorphosis; 2007
