= Baby Blues (Singaporean TV series) =

Chinese drama produced in Singapore

- 谁家母鸡不生蛋
- Starring: Chen Liping; Xie Shaoguang; Zhu Mimi; Michelle Chong; Chen Hanwei; Allan Wu; Jin Yinji
- Opening theme: 路 by Fish Leong
- Country of origin: Singapore
- Original language: Chinese
- No. of episodes: 20

Production
- Running time: approx. 45 minutes

Original release
- Network: MediaCorp Channel 8
- Release: 15 August – 9 September 2005

Related
- Baby Boom 我家四个宝 (2003)

Baby Blues (Chinese: 谁家母鸡不生蛋; pinyin: shéi jiā mǔ jī bù shēng dàn, lit "Whose hen doesn't lay eggs?") is a Chinese drama produced in Singapore and broadcast in 2005.

== Cast ==
- Chen Liping as Chen Qiaohua
- Xie Shaoguang as Lan Haishen
- Le Yao as Xiao Yao
- Mimi Chu as Liu Fengping
- Michelle Chong as Lan Shanhu
- Chen Hanwei as Jiang Weijie
- Angel Hou as Chen Qiaoyun
- Jin Yinji as Yang Shuilian
- Allan Wu
- Joey Swee
- Rachell Ng Ting Yi

== Accolades ==
| Year | Ceremony | Award | Nominees | Result | Ref |
|---|---|---|---|---|---|
| 2005 | Star Awards | Young Talent Award | Rachell Ng Ting Yi 黄莛贻 | Nominated | |
| 2005 | Star Awards | Best Theme Song | "路" | Nominated | |
