= Double Happiness (TV series) =

- 喜临门
- Written by: Ang Eng Tee
- Directed by: Chia Mien Yang
- Starring: Ivy Lee; Xie Shaoguang; Edmund Chen; Vivian Lai; Zhang Wei
- Opening theme: Season 1: 有家是福 by Le Sheng and Benny Wong, sung by Tay Ping Hui, Jeff Wang and Wang Shiyu
- Country of origin: Singapore
- Original language: Chinese
- No. of episodes: 141

Production
- Producer: Daisy Chan 陈建仪
- Running time: approx. 45 minutes

Original release
- Network: MediaCorp Channel 8
- Release: 2004 – 2005

Related
- Double Happiness II

Double Happiness (Chinese: 喜临门) is a Singaporean drama series on MediaCorp Channel 8 which was broadcast in March 2004 and ended in January 2005. It stars Ivy Lee, Xie Shaoguang, Edmund Chen, Vivian Lai and Zhang Wei as the casts of this series. It consists of two parts, with 70 episodes in this part of the show. The series revolves around the Luo family operating a fish and chips restaurant known as Happy Fish located at East Coast Road. The restaurant has its ups and downs, but eventually it will come out strong, but not without tragedies and lessons learnt.

== Plot ==
The main female character in the show is Yaxi, who has to struggle with the Luo family for the control of Happy Fish, a Fish and Chips Restaurant. Yaxi, who is married to the Luos' second son Jiaqi, is a career woman who had hardly frequents a kitchen and is asked to look after Happy Fish by her dying mother-in-law. The oldest in the Luo family is the fiery-headed and impetuous Jialong, who believes that Yaxi is corrupt and is involved in money-laundering, thus causing lots of misunderstandings, quarrels, mishaps, and adventures. Those included the beginning of an affair between Jiaxi and William, and it resulted in the deaths of Jiafu and Yaxi. Yaxi's death was due to a miscarriage, while Jiafu was killed from being assaulted by a madman who was sent by enemies of Happy Fish. Before Yaxi died, she admitted to Zibin her feelings for her husband who went overseas, and persuades Zibin not to seek revenge. During Jiafu's funeral, gunmen burst in and interrupted the ceremony, making a mess at the scene. Yaozu, the analytical one, deduced that it must have been sent by enemies of Happy Fish, one of them being the femme fatale Jiemin and her money-loving mother.

Meanwhile, Jialong was forced to marry a girl named Meili. His relationship with Meili was on the rocks when he became lazy and refused to work. He even went into human trafficking business, and narrowly avoided police arrest by seeking the help of his crime boss who has a hold on the police commissioner. Jialong resolved to change his ways for the better and decided to work part-time at Happy Fish, his family restaurant. He even adopted a child with Meili, and named him Luo Tianle, much to the family's dismay, because that was going to be the name of Yaxi's unborn (and dead) child.

Yaozu had an affair with the wife of a Taiwanese politician, and Yaozu's wife Jiayu unfortunately found out. To Yaozu's shock, Jiayu wants him to continue the affair, for she hopes to get a steady flow of cash. The politician, Ma Da, was furious when he received photos of that affair and sent gunmen to Singapore to kill Yaozu. Yaozu was lucky to avoid death, but had his spine broken from the brutal fight with them, and thus need to use a wheelchair for the rest of his life. Jiayu became depressed because of that.

After reading the story in the Romance of Three Kingdoms, Zibin, who became insane after Yaxi's death, believed that he is Liu Bei, who is going to avenge the death of Guan Yu (Yaxi). He deduced that it must be Happy Fish restaurant that was the cause of Yaxi's death. He decides to read up on Sun Tze's Art of War to have his revenge. Yaozu noticed that Zibin was reading the book and questioned his purpose. Zibin secretly added rat poison to Yaozu's coffee to prevent him from leaking out his mission. Zibin managed to keep his mission a secret, and Yaozu died from his poisoned state. Unknown to Zibin, Yaozu had however anticipated the move, and secretly recorded his suspicions about Zibin onto a CD, slotting it together with his Music CDs, before going off to drink the poisoned coffee.

A new restaurant by the name of "Original Happy Fish" was set up by the enemies of Happy Fish. Jiaxi went over to Original Happy Fish to work, as she believed that Happy Fish no longer has profitable business after so many mishaps. She gave the secret recipe to Original Happy Fish as well, in the secret hopes of seeing a revival. Jiemin, a beautiful girl who believes herself to be smart and talented, unwittingly had a relationship with Perry, who in secret was having an affair with her mother as well. Perry's mission was to cheat all of Original Happy Fish's money away. He paid gangsters to beat up Jiaxi's ex-husband who tried to stop his ex-wife from working at Original Happy Fish. Jiaxi, although hated her ex-husband, was shocked at Perry's actions and thus informed Jialong of the crimes Perry committed. Jialong in his drunken state told his bosom friends of all the mess that the family caused. Jiaxi also left Original Happy Fish, convinced that she was wrong to work there.

Jialong's blood brothers ganged up together with guns illegally imported overseas, and took down Happy Fish's rivals, the so-called "Original Happy Fish", in revenge. Jiemin was scarred from the incident, and was sent to a mental hospital to be treated for depression. Her gossiping mother had her leg broken instead, and she was furious at Jialong, accusing him of causing this mess. Jialong was shocked at his blood brothers' actions, and decided to report on them. All but one were arrested and sentenced to death, and the final blood brother who avoided capture showed up and torched Happy Fish. William sacrificed himself in order to put out the fires. A mourning Jiaxi, who was rummaging through Yaozu's Music CDs accidentally discovered the CD that had Yaozu's confession, and that finally exposed Zibin. Zibin turned out to be the final blood brother himself, and was sent to a mental hospital, where he finally committed suicide by taking the remaining rat poison he had with him.

Yaxi was also revealed to be alive, that although she really did suffered a miscarriage, her death was just a set-up to test the Luo family's sibling ties. The revelation shocked the Luo family, and out of respect to Yaxi's abilities and resourcefulness, decided to let her take control of Happy Fish. With that, it also strengthened the entire family's resolution to carry on the Happy Fish restaurant business without causing anymore tragedies. A miracle, however, occurred: Jiaqi, previously thought to have died in Afghanistan as a volunteer, turned out alive and well, and remarried another woman. Happy Fish's business improved and it expanded overseas, where Jialong's twin brother Goulong took charge.

== Cast ==
- Ivy Lee as Situ Yaxi, Jiaqi's wife
- Edmund Chen as Luo Jiaqi, Situ Yaxi's husband
- Xie Shaoguang as Luo Jialong, Yaxi's brother in law and Meili's husband
- Patricia Mok as Su Meili, Jialong's wife
- Xiang Yun as Luo Jiaxi, Jialong first younger sister, Xuezhi's wife
- Huang Yiliang as Lin Xuezhi, Jiaxi's husband
- Aileen Tan as Luo Jiayu
- Rayson Tan as Huang Yaozu, Jiayu's husband
- Vivian Lai as Luo Jiaqian
- Alan Tern as Lin Wenjie/Lin Wenxiong (Dual Role)
- Priscelia Chan as Lin Meijiao, later Shirley
- Jin Yinji as Mrs. Luo/Ah Feng (Dual Role)
- Hong Huifang as Luo Kaiyin, Kaijin's younger sister
- Henry Thia as Gao Ah Peng, Meijiao's former husband
- Jeff Wang as Luo Jiafu
- Chen Tianwen as William
- Yao Wenlong as Tang Jiaming
- Clarence Neo Jia Jun as Patrick, Yaozu and Jiayu's son
- Kimberly Wang as Donna, Yaozu and Jiayu's daughter
- Li Xianmin as Lin Wenwen, Jiaxi and Xuezhi's daughter
- Zhang Wei as Luo Kaijin

=== Guest cast ===
- Moses Lim as food show host
- Brandon Wong as gang leader
- Li Nanxing as Goulong

== Release ==
In 2007, MediaCorp sold the drama's rights to Chinese broadcaster CCTV8 and it was broadcast in China in 4 parts, 2 parts for each season.

== Accolades ==
Ceremony	Year	Award	Nominees	Result	Ref
Star Awards	2004	Young Talent Award	Li Xianmin 李咸慜	Won	
Star Awards	2004	Best Screenplay	Ang Eng Tee	Won	
Star Awards	2004	Best Actor	Xie Shaoguang	Won	
Star Awards	2004	Best Actress	Ivy Lee	Won	
Star Awards	2004	Best Actress	Xiang Yun	Nominated	
Star Awards	2004	Best Supporting Actor	Jeff Wang	Nominated	
Star Awards	2004	Best Supporting Actress	Hong Huifang	Nominated	
Star Awards	2004	Best Supporting Actress	Vivian Lai	Nominated	
Star Awards	2004	Best Drama Serial	—N/a	Nominated	
Star Awards	2007	Favourite On-screen Partners 最佳荧幕搭档	Edmund Chen and Ivy Lee (as Luo Jiaqi and Situ Yaxi)	Top 5	
