= Dai Peng =

Singaporean actor (1938–2013)

- Born: Dai Dexin; 19 September 1938; Singapore
- Died: 12 May 2013 (aged 74)
- Burial place: Mandai Crematorium and Columbarium
- Other name: Peng Dai
- Occupations: Actor; television and theatre director; screenwriter; playwright
- Years active: 1964−2013
- Spouse: Chen Yuying
- Children: 1

Stage name
- Traditional Chinese: 戴鵬
- Simplified Chinese: 戴鹏
- Hanyu Pinyin: Dài Péng

Birth name
- Traditional Chinese: 戴德馨
- Simplified Chinese: 戴德馨
- Hanyu Pinyin: Dài Déxīn

Dai Peng (born Dai Dexin; 19 September 1938 − 12 May 2013) was a Singaporean actor, theatre and radio personnel whose acting career spanned more than 40 years.

== Career ==
Prior to becoming a television actor, Dai had taught at Shuqun Secondary School for a year, and had worked in the administration department at Nanyang University and worked as a gold dealer. He was also active in the theatre scene, where he first performed at the age of 15, and had written and directed plays.

He began his career in the television industry in 1964, sometimes taking on both directing and acting roles at the same time in a number of productions. He had also wrote television screenplays and radio plays and did voiceover jobs. In 1983, Dai became a full-time Singapore Broadcasting Corporation (SBC) actor. He has mostly starred in supporting roles as the villain in multiple Channel 8 drama series. He also had notable eunuch roles in several period dramas, as well as prominent roles as an elderly man suffering from dementia in television series such as Dr Justice (1994) and Facing the Music (1998).

== Personal life ==
Dai was married to Chen Yuying, whom he got acquainted through a stage production. They have a son, Dai Liyao, who works in the advertising industry.

== Death ==
In April 2013, Dai felt unwell and visited the hospital for a routine check-up. Two weeks later, while the doctor was extracting bone marrow, he discovered that Dai was suffering from lymphoma. Dai was prescribed chemotherapy drugs, but reacted negatively to them, and treatment had to be stopped after a week.

A month later, Dai died on 12 May 2013 at 2.30 p.m. local time, at the age of 75. A memorial service was held at Saint Joseph's Church, which was attended by actors Zoe Tay, Vincent Ng, Huang Shinan, Edmund Chen, Xiang Yun and Li Yinzhu, among others. Dai was then cremated at the Mandai Crematorium and Columbarium.

== Selected filmography ==
Dai appeared in the following programmes and films:

=== Television series ===
- The Awakening (1984)
- Takeover (1985)
- The Unyielding Butterflies (1985)
- Samsui Women (1986)
- The Crossroad (1986)
- Men of Valour (1986)
- The Bond (1986)
- Moving On (1987)
- The Coffee Shop (1988)
- Strange Encounters (1988)
- On the Fringe (1988)
- My Fair Ladies (1988)
- A Mother's Love (1989)
- Navy (1990)
- The Last Swordsman (1991)
- Crime and Passion (1992)
- Angel of Vengeance (1993)
- Shadow in the Dark (1994)
- Paint a Rainbow (1994)
- Dr Justice (1994)
- Sparks of Life (1995)
- The Teochew Family (1995)
- King of Hades (1995)
- Love in A Foreign City (1997)
- Driven By A Car (1998)
- Legend of the Eight Immortals (1998)
- Facing the Music (1998)
- The Return of the Condor Heroes (1998)
- Mr OK (1999)
- Lost Soul (1999)
- Hero of the Times (1999)
- Hainan Kopi Tales (2000)
- The Coffee Shop (2002; season 2)

=== Film ===
- Fatal Memory (1995; telemovie)
- Thorny Love (1995; telemovie)
