= Samsui Women (TV series) =

1986 Singaporean TV series

- 红头巾/紅頭巾
- Genre: Period drama
- Created by: Ching Git Yan (程洁茵）
- Written by: Huang Yuxian (黄钰贤), Su Yin (苏殷）
- Starring: Zeng Huifen; Hong Huifang; Huang Wenyong; Li Yinzhu; Li Wenhai; Yang Lina; Li Yongci; Lin Meijiao; Hong Guorui
- Opening theme: "Samsui Women" (红头巾) by Sarah Chen
- Ending theme: “Days under the Sun" (艳阳下的日子）by Sarah Chen
- Country of origin: Singapore
- Original language: Mandarin
- No. of episodes: 24

Production
- Producer: George Wu （吴乔颐）
- Running time: approx. 45 minutes

Original release
- Network: SBC Channel 8 (now Mediacorp Channel 8)
- Release: 6 May – 13 June 1986

Related
- Men of Valour 盗日英雄传; Under One Roof 家和万事兴

Samsui Women (Simplified Chinese: 红头巾, Traditional Chinese: 紅頭巾, literally "The Red Bandana") is a 24-episode historical drama produced by the Singapore Broadcasting Corporation in 1986. Starring Zeng Huifen, Hong Huifang, Huang Wenyong and Li Yinzhu. It details the travails of the Samsui women, who came from Sanshui, China to Singapore in search of work in the construction industry, and whose hard work have helped shape Singapore for years.

Together with The Awakening, it is considered one of the greatest dramas produced by the SBC and catapulted veteran actress Zeng Huifen to stardom with her role as the hardworking and kind Ah Gui. The theme song was voted one of the top 5 favourite drama theme songs at the Star Awards 2007 25th anniversary special.

== Cast ==
- Zeng Huifen as Dai Ah Gui
- Hong Huifang as Dai Ah Xiu
- Huang Wenyong as Su Ah Zhi
- Li Wenhai as Ah Long
- Li Yinzhu as Ying Jie
- Wang Xiang Qin as Ah Bing
- Liao Lili as Ah Jin
- Lin Meijiao as Ah Yin
- Steven Woon as Ah Zhi's Grandfather
- Yang Lina as Ah Jiao
- Bhumi Paul as Zhuang Haolin
- Li Yongci as Zhuang Quan
- Chen Meng as Mrs Zhuang
- Chong Kwong Fatt as Cheng Er Niu
- Tang Hu as Yi Ding Zhi
- Liang Baozhu as Ah Gui's grandfather
- Dai Peng
- Michelle Chia as Young Dai Ah Gui (Ep 1)

== Production ==
The production team attempted to find the Samsui women to interview them about the past but could not locate them as they had mostly left their previous known living places in Chinatown, Singapore and only a few samsui women continued to work at constructions sites. The team approached the Sanshui clan association which the samsui women are part of. Interviews with them remained difficult as they refused to talk much about their past.

== Release ==
=== Broadcast ===
The show runs from 6 May to 13 June 1986.
