= Chua Swan =

Singaporean television producer (1947–2025)

- 蔡萱
- Born: 1947
- Died: 26 March 2025 (aged 78–79)
- Occupation: Television producer
- Spouse: Matsuo Yaeko (m. 2000, dead)
- Children: 2

Chua Swan (Chinese: 蔡萱; 1947 – 26 March 2025) was a Singaporean television producer and former senior production manager at the Singapore Broadcasting Corporation.

== Early life and education ==
Chua was of Teochew ancestry from Guangdong, and was born in 1947 into a family deeply rooted in education and the arts. His father, Chua Wenxuan (pen name Liu Beian), was a renowned Singaporean poet, writer, and calligrapher, who had served as principal of Datong Primary School in Pontian District, Johor, before joining Shaw Brothers as head of its Chinese-language division. His mother, Hong Fangping, served as principal of Xinmin Primary School and Nan’an Primary School.

The couple had four children—three sons and one daughter—with Chua Swan being the youngest son. Among his siblings were Chua Liang, Chua Dan, and Chua Lam, all of whom became prominent figures in the cultural and education sectors. His eldest sister Chua Liang was principal of Nanyang Girls' High School; Chua Dan worked as a distribution manager at Shaw Brothers; and Chua Lam became a well-known film producer and columnist in Hong Kong.

Chua said that, due to his father's job, the family frequently received complimentary movie tickets. After school, he could watch up to three films in a single day. Chua was said to have been brought to cinemas as an infant, and the brothers grew up largely in movie theatres, developing a strong passion for film from an early age.

In addition to film, Chua showed early talent in writing. According to Chua Lam, Chua Swan was already writing extensively in primary school, copying and continuing stories inspired by Jin Yong's wuxia novels, producing tens of thousands of words—an output that astonished the family.

Chua graduated from The Chinese High School, and later enrolled in the Engineering Management programme at Nanyang University.

After graduation, Chua aspired to enter the film and television industry, but due to limited financial means, initially pursued self-study while working. His elder brother Chua Lam, who was studying film in Japan and working as Shaw Brothers’ Tokyo representative, later sponsored him to study in Japan. Chua subsequently graduated from the Chiyoda Television Academy in Tokyo.

== Media career ==
In 1972, Chua joined Singapore Broadcasting Corporation as an assistant director, later being promoted to director. In 1980, he was promoted to become an Executive producer.

Over his career, he produced more than 200 television dramas, including highly popular 1980s series such as Kopi-O, Son of Pulau Tekong, and Paint A Rainbow, as well as Pretty Faces which marked a breakthrough for actress Zoe Tay. Kopi-O achieved record-breaking viewership exceeding one million at the time.

In April 2000, Chua retired from Mediacorp, with On The Frontline being his final production. There were reports that his retirement was forced; Chua later wrote in the book Looking Back at Caldecott Hill that the broadcaster implemented cost-cutting measures in the late 1990s, offering senior, higher-paid staff early retirement packages, which he accepted.

After leaving television, Chua served as production director at Singapore web production company C-Jin Network Pte Ltd. He invited SPH artistes Kym Ng and Bryan Wong to share their career struggles and aspirations through online platforms.

Chua also compiled his newspaper column “Gossip Pavilion” from Lianhe Zaobao into a book titled The Fate of Chua Swan, published by Cosmos Books in Hong Kong in September 2005.

== Personal life ==
In 2000, Chua married Japanese national Matsuo Yaeko. The couple had a son and a daughter. His wife died in 2020.

=== Death ===
Chua Swan died on 26 March 2025 at 11:00 a.m., aged 78. According to his son, Chua had previously suffered from mild myelofibrosis, which worsened in the month prior to his death and developed into acute leukemia. He experienced severe breathing difficulties during a hospital visit on 25 March and was admitted to the emergency department, but died the following day.
