= Mavis Hee =

Singaporean singer-songwriter and actress (1974)

- 许美静
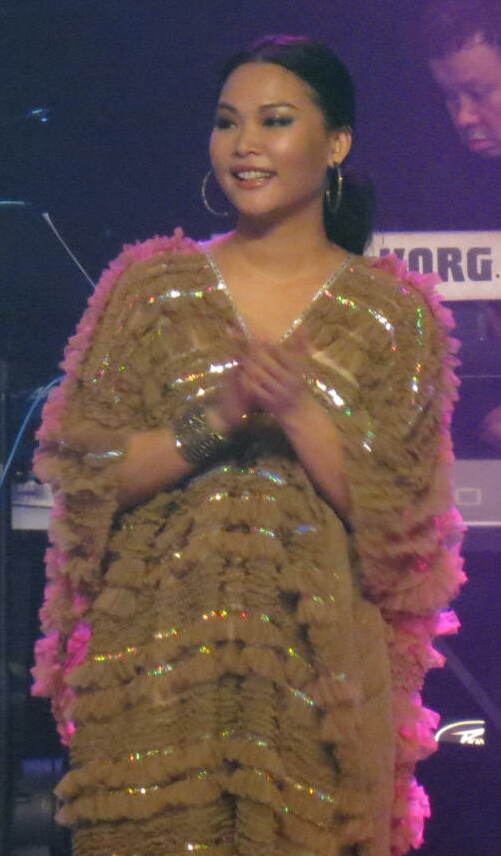
- Hee in 2012
- Born: Mavis Hee Pee Hong; 27 September 1974 (age 51); Singapore
- Other names: Mavis Hsu; Mavis Xu
- Education: East Payoh Secondary School
- Occupations: Singer; songwriter; actress
- Years active: 1994–2000; 2006–present
- Musical career
- Genres: Mandopop; Cantopop
- Instrument: Vocals
- Labels: What's Music; Universal Music

Stage name
- Simplified Chinese: 许美静
- Traditional Chinese: 許美靜
- Hanyu Pinyin: Xǔ Měijìng

Birth name
- Simplified Chinese: 许美凤
- Traditional Chinese: 許美鳳
- Hanyu Pinyin: Xǔ Měifèng

Mavis Hee Pee Hong (Chinese: 许美凤; pinyin: Xǔ Měifèng; born 27 September 1974), known professionally as Mavis Hee or Xu Meijing (Chinese: 许美静; pinyin: Xǔ Měijìng), is a Singaporean singer, songwriter and actress. She was the second runner-up and also Miss Photogenic and Miss Amity in Singapore's Miss Chinatown Pageant 1992.

== Career ==
In 1994, songwriter and producer Tan Kah Beng organised a singing contest to scout for potential singers for his new record company. Hee entered the contest and was picked by Tan. Hee's first album Knowingly (明知道) was released in August 1994. After the release, Taiwanese singer-composer Jonathan Lee invited her to join his production company. However, Hee rejected the offer so that she could continue working with her mentor, Tan.

Hee went on to release other chart-topping albums. Her debut album in Taiwan, Regret, propelled her to regional stardom. She was labelled "Heavenly Queen Killer" (天后杀手) for having beaten Faye Wong and the 'Four Heavenly Kings of Cantopop' in sales charts. The album sold 600,000 copies in Taiwan alone. Her next album, Living By Night (都是夜归人), chalked an impressive 550,000 copies in Taiwan. Both albums sold more than 2,000,000 copies in Asia with Regret selling close to 2,500,000 copies.

Following the success, Hee broke into the competitive Cantonese market with the release of Listen Quietly (静听精彩13首). The album topped the Hong Kong International Federation of Phonographic Industry sales chart for 3 consecutive weeks, beating Hong Kong singers Andy Lau, Leon Lai and Sammi Cheng. She became the first Singaporean to win the Most Popular Female Singer award in HK Metro Hit awards, beating Faye Wong.

In 1995, Hee acted in Mediacorp's drama serial, Tofu Street.

She also released a compilation album, Beginning To Listen: Review 1996-1999, which sold close to 500,000 copies in Taiwan. Its success is attributed to the only new song "The Cigarette You Smoke" (你抽的烟) in the album as it is made popular by being featured in a Taiwanese TV series.

Her last studio album to date is the electronic infused Static Electricity (静电) in 2000. She remains best known for her ballads, some of which have become classic songs, such as "Regret" (遗憾), "Iron Window" (铁窗), "Living By Night" (都是夜归人), "Sunshine After the Rain" (阳光总在风雨后) and "Moonlight in the City" (城里的月光).

In 1998, Hee was handpicked by the cinematographer Christopher Doyle to star in his directorial debut film Away With Words.

Hee faded out from the entertainment scene after 2001, when her record company, What's Music, was absorbed into Universal Music Taiwan, and the company could not accommodate her artistic integrity within commercial considerations. Hee was also appointed a cultural ambassador for China in 2001. She also recorded the hit single "Watch TV" with fellow Singaporean singers Tanya Chua and Stefanie Sun and was a guest presenter at the Star Awards 2002 as well as Star Awards 2006.

Her major public performances after 2006 include CCTV's annual mega Mid-Autumn Show 2008 which raised Hee's profile briefly throughout China and Asia, as well as being a special guest during Nanyang Technological University EMBA's 10th Anniversary Celebrations and Stefanie Sun's concert in 2014.

In 2015, Singapore's Mediacorp released a drama serial titled Crescendo that is loosely based on Hee's singing career.

In 2021, Hee released a re-recording of "Moonlight in the City" in partnership with Disney+, to promote the expanded library of Asian content on the platform. The release was accompanied by a music video featuring Hee performing the song with people of various ages. In an email interview with 8 Days, she also expressed her plans to release new music soon and tour China in the next year.

In 2023, Hee performed at the National Day Concert held jointly by Gardens by the Bay and Mediacorp in Singapore. She was also part of the lineup for a number of music festivals in China in cities including Hainan, Xi'an and Shanghai.

On 20 April 2024, Hee performed in Nanjing, China and has sparked controversy for performing for 30 minutes with one hour dedicated to an audience engagement session, with calls for refunds by her fans. The concert was originally intended to last for two and a half hours.

In December 2025, Hee will perform at the Sing60 Music Festival at Singapore's Fort Canning Park.

== Personal life ==
=== Health issues ===
In June 2006, Hee was arrested after harassing two hotel guests at the Ritz-Carlton Hotel. She was warded at Singapore's Institute of Mental Health and diagnosed with clinical depression after a short stay of four weeks. She thanked her fans for their support in late 2006.

Hee received the NHG Exemplary Patient Award from IMH on 27 October 2014 where she discussed her experience with clinical depression openly and has strongly advocated for mental wellness, encouraging people to seek treatment early.

=== Social causes ===
Hee became the ambassador of Singapore's National Kidney Foundation in 1999 and also a volunteer in Youth Challenge in the same year. She performed the Singapore National Day Parade 2000 theme song, "Shine on Me", together with Jai Wahab.

Hee appeared as a special guest on 13 February 2007 at a Charity Concert for Silver Ribbon (Singapore) and sang "Moonlight in the City". On 27 September 2007, Hee's 33rd birthday, she released two new singles after a hiatus of seven years. They were the theme songs of the movie, Anna & Anna, "Remain Behind" (留下) and "Unknown Location" (不知处). In June 2008, Hee performed the opening act for a charity concert with other Singaporean singers to raise funds to help the victims of the 2008 Sichuan earthquake, she sang "Moonlight in the City" and "Sunshine After the Rain".

== Discography ==
- Knowingly 明知道 (1994) (Mandarin) (Singapore release only)
- Regret 遗憾 (1996) (Mandarin) (Taiwanese debut album)
- Living By Night 都是夜归人 (1996) (Mandarin)
- Spreading 蔓延 (1997) (Mandarin)
- Listen Quietly 静听精彩13首 (1997) (Cantonese & Mandarin)
- Cover Myself 好美静 (1998) (Cantonese)
- Ex-Friends EP 一场朋友EP (1998) (Cantonese)
- Happiness Is Not Wrong 快乐无罪 (1999) (Mandarin)
- Beginning To Listen: Review 1996–1999 (Mandarin)
- Static Electricity 静电 (2000) (Mandarin)

== Filmography ==
=== Television series ===
- Tofu Street (1995)
- Wo Men Yi Jia Dou Shi Ren (我們一家都是人; 1997)
- The New Adventures of Wisely (1998)
- S.N.A.G (新好男人; 1999)

=== Film ===
- Away with Words (1999)
