= Zero to Hero (TV series) =

2005 Singaporean TV drama series

- 阴差阳错
- Genre: Police procedural Fantasy
- Written by: 陆慧凝 彭凯毅
- Directed by: Png Keh Hock 方傢福; Leong Lye Lin 梁来玲
- Starring: Edmund Chen; Chen Liping; Li Xianhuan; Xiao Liyuan
- Opening theme: 阴差阳错 sung by JJ Lin
- Ending theme: 一千年以后 sung by JJ Lin
- Country of origin: Singapore
- Original language: Mandarin
- No. of episodes: 20

Production
- Producer: Yeo Saik Pin 杨锡彬
- Running time: approx. 45 minutes

Original release
- Network: MediaCorp TV Channel 8
- Release: 16 May – 10 June 2005

Zero to Hero (阴差阳错) was a MediaCorp TV Channel 8 comedy drama series which aired from 16 May 2005 to 10 June 2005. The series is unique as it portrays the traditional Chinese beliefs of the netherworld and afterlife (e.g. 18 levels of hell, incarnation) in a light-hearted way.

== Plot ==
The burning of cash in the form of joss paper and other material items such as mobile phones in the form of cardboard were depicted in the series. It is a traditional Chinese belief that the deceased would receive those items burned for them in the netherworld.

Xie Jizu is a police officer who often spends his free time gambling rather than caring for his family. He dies in a car accident and went to the netherworld, where he befriends some spirits and hear the sad tales of how they died. Zhengde, a general contractor, was brutally murdered but police were never able to crack the case. Jizu decides to make amends by helping Zhengde find his murderer.

== Cast ==
- Edmund Chen as Xie Jizu
- Chen Liping as Zhong Lizhi, Jizu's wife
- Li Xianhuan as Xie Sixi
- Xiao Liyuan as Xie Sanyuan

=== Other cast ===
- Patricia Mok as Xie Xiumei, Jizu's sister
- Zheng Geping as Xu Zhiniang ("Elephant"), Xiumei's husband
- Zhang Wei as Xie Shiyi, Jizu and Xiumei's father
- Li Yinzhu as Wang Guiji, Jizu and Xiumei's mother
- Florence Tan as Dolly Leow, Lin Zhengde's wife
- Andrew Seow as Lin Zhengde/Xu Zhengde
- Brandon Wong as Ah Bao (Alex)
- Yao Wenlong as Ah Bang
- Chen Jyh Cheng as Newton, one of the guards of the netherworld
- Jin Yinji as Jizu's 6th great-grandmother
- Henry Thia as "Angmoh Zai"
- Ye Shipin as Ah Gu, the durian seller
- Zen Chong as Ah Ping
- Liang Tian as Uncle Tang
- Fraser Tiong as Ah Car
- Carole Lin as Ah Car's mother

== Accolades ==
Organisation	Year	Award	Nominee	Result	Ref
Star Awards	2006	Young Talent Award	Fraser Tiong 张家奇	Nominated	
Star Awards	2006	Young Talent Award	Xiao Liyuan 肖力源	Nominated	
Star Awards	2006	Best Theme Song	"阴差阳错"	Nominated	
Star Awards	2006	Best Supporting Actress	Carole Lin	Nominated	
Star Awards	2006	Top Rated Drama Serial	Zero to Hero	Won	
