= The Golden Pillow =

- 金枕头
- Genre: Epic Drama
- Starring: Alex Man 万梓良; Zoe Tay 郑惠玉; Fann Wong 范文芳; Xie Shaoguang 谢韶光; Xiang Yun 向云; Huang Wenyong 黄文永; Zhang Xinxiang張文祥; Bernard Tan
- Opening theme: 依然是我 by Alex Man 万梓良
- Country of origin: Singapore
- Original language: Mandarin
- No. of episodes: 40

Production
- Running time: approx. 45 minutes

Original release
- Network: TCS-8
- Release: 21 November 1995 – 15 January 1996

The Golden Pillow (simplified Chinese: 金枕头; traditional Chinese: 金枕頭) is a 40-episode epic drama produced by the Television Corporation of Singapore (now MediaCorp) in 1995.

== Synopsis ==
The story is about Ren Niang, who attempts to find success and happiness in his life. Born in Thailand, Ren Niang goes to Singapore in search of his long-lost biological father Sai Qilin and gets entangled in a love triangle along the way. He chances upon a mysterious "golden pillow" rumoured to possess magical powers. Part of the plot involves various characters trying to get their hands on the golden pillow.

== Legacy ==
The series was one of earliest Singaporean drama series to be filmed on location overseas (part of it was filmed in Europe).

At the Star Awards 2007 anniversary special celebrating 25 years of local Chinese television, the scene of Fann Wong, Zoe Tay and Alex Man "listening" to the golden pillow was named one of the top 5 most memorable scenes. Xie Shaoguang's character Sai Wei was voted one of the top 10 most memorable villains.

== Awards ==
Accolades	Award	Nominee	Result
Star Awards 1996 Show 2	Best Supporting Actress 最佳女配角	Yang Libing 杨莉冰	Nominated
Star Awards 1996 Show 2	Best Actress 最佳女主角	Zoe Tay 郑惠玉	Won
Star Awards 1996 Show 2	Best Supporting Actor 最佳男配角	Xie Shaoguang 谢韶光	Won
Star Awards 1996 Show 2	Best Supporting Actor 最佳男配角	Zhang Xinxiang	Nominated
Star Awards 1996 Show 2	Best Drama Serial 最佳电视剧	—N/a	Nominated
