= Zeng Huifen =

Singaporean actress (born 1962)

- Born: Chan Wai Fun; 4 February 1962 (age 63)
- Occupation: Actress
- Years active: Since 1983
- Spouse: Jimmy Lim (m. 1991)
- Children: 2
- Musical career
- Also known as: Jacqueline Chan

Zeng Huifen (Chinese: 曾慧芬; pinyin: Zēng Huìfēn; born 4 February 1962), also known as Jacqueline Chan, is a Singaporean actress. She was prominently a full-time Mediacorp artiste from 1983 to 1996. She is best known for starring in numerous Singaporean dramas from the 1980s to the 1990s, most notably in Samsui Women.

== Career ==
Zeng started her acting career in 1983 after completing SBC's 3rd artiste drama training course and debuted in Army Series (新兵小传). She later starred alongside her drama coursemate Wang Yuqing in the Singapore Broadcasting Corporation's classic drama The Flying Fish.

Zeng continued to perform in several dramas such as the 1985 hit drama Takeover (人在旅途) which gained her popularity in China. It was her role as the lead character Ah Gui in the 1986 blockbuster period drama Samsui Women which shot her to fame.

Zeng continued taking on more lead roles in various local television and telemovie productions. In 1995, she was nominated in the Star Awards Best Actress category for her role in the telemovie The Chance Of Life. In 1996, she became the first actress to ever be nominated for three different awards at the annual Star Awards. The three awards she was nominated for were: the Best Actress Award for Dr Justice II, Best Supporting Actress Award for The Teochew Family, and the Top 5 Most Popular Female Artiste Award. Zeng managed to bag the Best Supporting Actress award.

Zeng retired from showbiz in 1997.

== Personal life ==
Zeng studied at Nan Chiau High School.

Zeng married Jimmy Lim, an oil rig engineer, in May 1991 and have 2 children. In 1997, Zeng relocated to Texas, United States with her family for her husband's work. She returned to Singapore with her family in 1998.

Since retiring Zeng has made several public appearances, such as Zoe Tay's wedding in 2001 and during Zeng's good friend Chen Liping's Slim 10 court case, showing up with Chen, in October 2003. She has also made several guest appearances at MediaCorp's anniversary events. Most recently, she was contacted by MediaCorp for the anniversary special feature Star Reunion (那些年，我们一起看电视) in 2012 and she replied via e-mail that she was doing well.

== Filmography ==
Year	Title	Role	Notes	Ref
1983	Double Blessings 春风得意			
1983	Army Series 新兵小传			
1983	All That Glitters is Not Gold 捷径			
1983	The Flying Fish	Ah Fen 阿芬 (Cat)		
1984	Spice of Life 四日谈 之《花圃的秘密》	Bi Wen 碧纹		
1984	Blossoms in the Sun 阳光蜜糖	Du Juan Juan 杜娟娟		
1984	Growing Up 吾家有子			
1985	Takeover 人在旅途	Kang Li 康莉		
1986	Samsui Women	Dai Ah Gui 戴阿桂		
1986	Crossroads 红绿灯 之《红灯》	Luo Wan Xia 洛晚霞		
1987	Sunshine After Rain 雨过天晴	Zhou Yu Fang 周瑜芳		
1987	Paint a Rainbow 调色板	Mo Ji Ping 莫纪萍		
1987	I Do 君子好逑	Zhong Shu Jun 钟淑君		
1987	Pickpockets 提防小手	Guan Cun Hui 关存慧		
1988	Airforce			
1988	The Last Applause 舞榭歌台	Lin Ya Wen 林雅雯		
1988	Mystery 迷离夜 之《谜》	Lei Sha 雷莎		
1988	Ups and Downs 婚姻保险	Guan Cui Wen 关萃雯		
1989	A Long Way Home 燃烧岁月	Hu Yue Qing 胡月青		
1989	A Mother's Love 亲心唤我心	He Jia Huan 何家欢		
1990	Imperial Intrigues 大内双宝	Jiang Die Niang 江蝶娘		
1990	Happy World 多多富贵多多情	Yang Bao Yi 杨宝仪		
1991	The Woman I Marry 家有恶妻	Jia Ming Zhu 贾明珠		
1992	Fiery Passion 烈焰焚情	Chen Jia Jing 陈家靖		
1992	Between Friends 山水喜相逢	Shen Pian Pian 沈翩翩		
1993	Invincible Warriors 皇朝铁将金粉情	Lan Kong Fei Xue 蓝空飞雪		
1993	The Wilful Siblings 斗气姐妹	Yang Hong Ping 杨红萍 (Amy) / Fang Ling Ling 方玲玲		
1994	Dark Obsession 疯蝶	Yu Li Qing 余丽清	Telemovie	
1994	A Chance of Life 生死一线	Lin Ai Li 林爱莉	Telemovie Nominated for Best Actress at Star Awards 1995	
1994	Fiery Of Lover 烈火情人	Ou Shu Xin 欧淑心		
1994	Dr Justice 法医故事 之《红颜裁决》	Gao Yu Zhen 高玉珍		
1995	Secret Files 机密档案	Zhong Yin 钟茵		
1995	The Teochew Family	Cai Chu Ning 蔡楚宁	Won Best Supporting Actress at Star Awards 1996	
1995	Dr Justice II 法医故事II 之《雨夜安魂曲》	Shen Xi Shuang 沈惜双	Nominated for Best Actress at Star Awards 1996	
1996	Beyond Dawn 女子监狱	Lin Mei Yan 林美燕		
1996	Triumph Over The Green 爱拼球会赢	Tang An Qi 唐安琪		
1996	Three-In-One Love 爱情三合一	Lao Yu Zhu 老玉珠		
1996	Mirror of Life 实况剧场 之《三水红头巾》	Yu Xiu Jin 余秀金（金姐）		

== Awards and nominations ==
Year	Ceremony	Category	Nominated work	Result	Ref
1995	Star Awards	Best Actress	A Chance of Life (as Lin Ai Li)	Nominated	
1996	Star Awards	Best Supporting Actress	The Teochew Family (as Cai Chu Ning)	Won	
1996	Star Awards	Best Actress	Dr Justice II (as Shen Xi Shuang )	Nominated	
