= Born to Shine =

Born to Shine may refer to:

- Born to Shine (British TV series)
- Born to Shine (Philippine TV series)
