= Star Awards for Best Supporting Actress =

Singaporean television award

Star Awards for Best Supporting Actress 最佳女配角
- Awarded for: Best Performance by an Actress in a Supporting Role
- Country: Singapore
- Presented by: Mediacorp
- First award: 1995
- Most recent winner: Chen Liping — Emerald Hill - The Little Nyonya Story (2026)

Highlights
- Most awards: Xiang Yun (5)
- Most nominations: Xiang Yun (13)

The Star Awards for Best Supporting Actress is an award presented annually at the Star Awards, a ceremony that was established in 1994.

The category was introduced in 1995, at the 2nd Star Awards ceremony; Zhu Xiufeng received the award for her role in Chronicle of Life and it is given in honour of a Mediacorp actress who has delivered an outstanding performance in a supporting role. The nominees are determined by a team of judges employed by Mediacorp; winners are selected by a majority vote from the entire judging panel.

Since its inception, the award has been given to 20 actresses. Chen Liping is the most recent winner in this category for her role in Emerald Hill - The Little Nyonya Story. Since the ceremony held in 2023, Xiang Yun remains as the only actress to win in this category five times, surpassing Lin Meijiao who has three wins. In addition, Xiang Yun has been nominated on 13 occasions, more than any other actress. Lin also holds the record for the most nominations without a win, with seven (she eventually won her first award in 2013). Bonnie Loo is currently the actress who have the most nominations without a win, with five.

== Recipients ==
Year	Actress	Work title (role)	Nominees	Ref.
1995	Zhu Xiufeng	Chronicle of Life (Old Madam Jiang 蒋老夫人)	Angela Ang — Veil of Darkness (Hetian Meizi 和田美子); Li Yinzhu — Dr Justice (Ding Baoping 丁宝萍); Lin Meijiao — Silk of Love (Zhou Anyi 周安逸); Yang Libing — Challenge of Truth (Yu Zhenzhen 余珍珍)	
1996	Zeng Huifen	The Teochew Family (Cai Chuning 蔡楚宁)	Chen Huihui — Tofu Street 豆腐街 (Auntie Wonton 云吞嫂); Hong Huifang — The Teochew Family 潮州家族 (Sun Fengyu 孙凤玉); Li Yinzhu — Waves of Courage 逐浪青春 (Liang Peiyun 梁佩云); Yang Libing — The Golden Pillow 金枕头 (Jinqiu 锦秋)	
1997	Hong Huifang	The Price of Peace (Wang Jinfeng 王金凤)	Huang Biren — Courting Trouble (Wanqing 宛清); Cassandra See — The Unbeatables II (Luo Wenxin 洛文欣); Tracer Wong — Don't Worry, Be Happy (Chen Jiazhen 陈家珍); Yang Libing — River of Love (Liu Shuluan 刘淑鸾)	
1998	Xiang Yun	Around People's Park (Hua 阿花)	Chen Huihui — The Guest People (Wu Jinyan 巫金燕); Hong Huifang — Facing the Music (Mimi 咪咪); Yvonne Lim — The Return of the Condor Heroes (Guo Xiang 郭襄); Kym Ng — The New Adventures of Wisely (Hai De 海德)	
1999	Yang Libing	Wok of Life (Zeng Haolian 曾浩莲)	Chen Huihui — Stepping Out (Danniang 丹娘); Yvonne Lim — Stepping Out (Haiyan 海燕); Florence Tan — Wok of Life (Ma Daixiang 马带香); Tracer Wong — Out to Win (Wang Ailian 王爱莲)	
2000	Xiang Yun	My Home Affairs (Yan 阿燕)	Chen Huihui — Hainan Kopi Tales (Chen Xuezhen 陈雪珍); Hong Huifang — The Legendary Swordsman (Ning Zhongze 宁中则); Huang Biren — Angel's Dream (Ye Ning 叶宁); Florence Tan — The Legendary Swordsman (Lan Fenghuang 蓝凤凰)	
2001	Xiang Yun	The Challenge (Wang Liguang 王丽光)	Chen Huihui — Love Me, Love Me Not (Zhang Xuelian 张学莲); Yvonne Lim — Master Swordsman Lu Xiaofeng 2 (Ye Xue 叶雪); Lin Meijiao — Three Women and A Half (Liao Yanling 廖燕玲); Florence Tan — The Invincible Squad (Sun Jiawen 孙嘉文)	
2002	Chen Huihui	The Wing of Desire (Hu Xiujuan 胡秀娟)	Lin Meijiao — Brotherhood (Chen Yi 陈仪); Joey Swee — The Reunion (Long Mingzhu 龙明珠); Tan Kheng Hua — Beautiful Connection (Mo Lanying 莫兰英); Tracer Wong — The Vagrant (Mao Nana 毛娜娜)	
2003	Patricia Mok	Holland V (Mo Lingling 莫玲玲)	Hong Huifang — Viva Le Famille II (Pan Jinglian 潘晶莲); Carole Lin — Springs of Life (Cai Daxiao 蔡大笑); Lin Meijiao — Romance de Amour (Xu Fangni 许芳妮); Xiang Yun — Holland V (Su Yueping 苏月萍)	
2004	Li Yinzhu	A Child's Hope II (Ya Feng 亚丰)	Chen Liping — A Child's Hope II (Zhang Huilan 张慧兰); Hong Huifang — Double Happiness I (Luo Kaiyin 罗开银); Vivian Lai — Double Happiness I (Luo Jiaqian 罗家倩); May Phua — An Ode to Life (Pan Zinan 潘子男)	
2005	Yvonne Lim	Portrait of Home (Fyn)	Hong Huifang — Double Happiness II (Luo Kaiyin 罗开银); Vivian Lai — Double Happiness II (Luo Jiaqian 罗家倩); Carole Lin — Zero to Hero (Chen Hongzhu 陈红珠); Jesseca Liu — Portrait of Home (Ruan Mian 阮棉)	
2006	Hong Huifang	The Shining Star (Peipei 佩佩)	Felicia Chin — Women of Times (Ou Xiangyun 欧湘云); Lin Meijiao — Family Matters (Gao Wei 高薇); Constance Song — C.I.D. (Tata); Xiang Yun — Love at 0°C (Liao Qunfang 廖群芳)	
2007	May Phua	Mars vs Venus (Su Limei Carman 苏丽梅)	Eelyn Kok — Kinship (Zhao Shuiling 赵水灵); Ezann Lee — Making Miracles (Xiaoyuan 小媛); Ng Hui — The Greatest Love of All (Tang Caining 唐彩凝); Jacqueline Sue — Like Father, Like Daughter (Lian 阿莲)	
2009	Ng Hui	The Little Nyonya (Tao 阿桃)	Wayne Chua — The Golden Path (Bak Kut Girl 肉骨妹); Eelyn Kok — The Little Nyonya (Huang Zhenzhu 黄珍珠); Li Yinzhu — The Little Nyonya (Old Mrs Chen 陈老太); Lin Meijiao — The Little Nyonya (Guihua 桂花)	
2009	Xiang Yun	The Little Nyonya (Tianlan 天兰 / Old Yamamoto Yueniang 老山本月娘)	Wayne Chua — The Golden Path (Bak Kut Girl 肉骨妹); Eelyn Kok — The Little Nyonya (Huang Zhenzhu 黄珍珠); Li Yinzhu — The Little Nyonya (Old Mrs Chen 陈老太); Lin Meijiao — The Little Nyonya (Guihua 桂花)	
2010	Constance Song	The Ultimatum 双子星 (Jiang Ruolin 蒋若琳)	Paige Chua — The Dream Catchers (Zhang Xiaowei 张小薇); Hong Huifang — Together (He Jiao 何娇); Aileen Tan — Together (Liu Maomao 刘毛毛); Xiang Yun — Baby Bonus (Huang Meiling 黄美玲)	
2011	Pan Lingling	Breakout (Cai Siling 蔡思灵)	Cynthia Koh — Happy Family (Jiang Mei'e 姜美娥); Ann Kok — The Family Court (Zheng Danni 郑丹妮); Lin Meijiao — Breakout (Bai Huahua 白花花); Xiang Yun — Unriddle (Yang Qiujun 杨秋君)	
2012	Vivian Lai	Love Thy Neighbour (Shan Shan 单珊)	Yvonne Lim — The Oath (Yunwen 韵文); Ng Hui — Kampong Ties (Han Xiuyuan 韩秀圆); Kate Pang — On the Fringe (Zhong Ling 钟玲); Constance Song — On the Fringe (Nancy)	
2013	Lin Meijiao	Game Plan (Zhang Shiyun 张诗云)	Jin Yinji — It Takes Two (Mother of Hao Youcai 郝有财妈); Kate Pang — Joys of Life (Sun Lianjing 孙廉菁); Constance Song — Don't Stop Believin' (Li Shengchun 李圣春); Xiang Yun — Pillow Talk (Mao Yunling 毛蕴岭)	
2014	Rebecca Lim	The Dream Makers (Xiao Lixia Lisa 萧丽霞)	Priscelia Chan — The Journey: A Voyage (Han Xiuxiang 韩秀香); Hong Huifang — Love At Risk (Fu Meili Beauty 符美丽); Aileen Tan — C.L.I.F. 2 (Seetoh Yan 司徒燕); Xiang Yun — Beyond (Zhang Cuiyan 张翠燕)	
2015	Joanne Peh	The Journey: Tumultuous Times (Zhang Huiniang 张蕙娘)	Paige Chua — Against the Tide (Zhang Jingxuan 张静璇); Julie Tan — Three Wishes (Zhao Xiaomin 赵晓敏); Carrie Wong — The Journey: Tumultuous Times (Sweet Soup Lass 糖水妹); Xiang Yun — The Caregivers (Molly)	
2016	Julie Tan	The Dream Makers II (Dong Zihuai 董子怀)	Paige Chua — Good Luck (Fang Enqi 方恩琦); Bonnie Loo — Tiger Mum (Chen Huiyan 陈慧妍); Sheila Sim — 118 (Hong Shanshan 洪姗姗); Carrie Wong — 118 (Zhang Ke Ai 张可爱)	
2017	Aileen Tan	Hero (Huang Lili 黄丽丽)	Paige Chua — Hero (Ou Jinxuan 区金萱); Bonnie Loo — Hero (Guan Meimei 关美美); Pan Lingling — Hero (Xiao Jiahui 萧家慧); Ya Hui — House of Fortune (Wu Xixi 吴希希)	
2018	Kym Ng	When Duty Calls (Loke Mei Guang 陆美光)	Bonnie Loo — Mightiest Mother-in-Law (Qi Wanling 齐婉灵); Mei Xin — When Duty Calls (Germaine Yeoh 姚一心); Sheila Sim — 118 II (Hong Shanshan 洪姗姗); Aileen Tan — Have a Little Faith (Zhuang Kelian 庄可莲)	
2019	Lin Meijiao	Fifty & Fabulous (Ma Keqing 马可晴)	He Ying Ying — A Million Dollar Dream (Zhang Yijing 张一静); Cynthia Koh — Say Cheese (Pan Zeguo 潘泽国); Sheila Sim — Eat Already? 4 (Cheryl); Aileen Tan — You Can Be An Angel III (Zhou Lilian 周丽莲)	
2021	Kym Ng	Daybreak (Zhang Tianqing 张天晴)	Cynthia Koh — After the Stars (Zhen Mei 甄美); Lin Meijiao — After the Stars (Zhang Lan 张岚); Bonnie Loo — C.L.I.F. 5 (Lu Kexin 陆可心); Chantalle Ng — Terror Within (Lin Xiaoyu 林晓雨); Lina Ng — Terror Within (Lin Xiuhong 林秀红); Aileen Tan — Hello Miss Driver (Zheng Xueqin 郑雪琴)	
2022	Lin Meijiao	My Star Bride (Pan Xiuqin 潘秀琴)	Cynthia Koh — My Star Bride (Chung Peipei 钟佩佩); Bonnie Loo — Key Witness (Hannah Chua); Lina Ng — Key Witness (Ye Lina 叶莉娜); Rui En — The Heartland Hero (Qiu Jingwen 邱静雯)	
2023	Xiang Yun	Your World in Mine (Wang Jinhui 王金慧)	Cynthia Koh — Leave No Soul Behind (Wu Yuwei 吴羽薇); Kym Ng — When Duty Calls 2 (Loke Mei Guang 陆美光); Lina Ng — Your World In Mine (Xiuzhu 秀珠); Aileen Tan — Dark Angel (Alex)	
2024	Aileen Tan	SHERO (Chen Meihua 陈梅华)	Chen Liping — The Sky Is Still Blue (Hong Aixi 洪艾西); Hong Huifang — Strike Gold (Cardboard Granny 纸皮婆); Jin Yinji — Cash on Delivery (Grandma Zhu 珠嫲); Ya Hui — Family Ties (Yi Xin 易馨)	
2025	Cynthia Koh	Hope Afloat (Li Zihui 黎子慧)	Lynn Lim — Kill Sera Sera (Ruby); Mei Xin — Born to Shine (Qi Keling 齐可龄); Tasha Low — Coded Love (Lisa Ong); Ya Hui — Coded Love (Cate)	
2026	Chen Liping	Emerald Hill - The Little Nyonya Story (Cai Zhu Niang 蔡珠娘)	Cynthia Koh - I Believe I Can Fly (Xie Zhen Mei 谢珍美); Dawn Yeoh - Emerald Hill - The Little Nyonya Story (Kang Si Li 康丝丽); Jojo Goh - Emerald Hill - The Little Nyonya Story (Li Shu Yu 李淑玉); Xiang Yun - The Gift of Time (Xu Qiaomei 徐巧妹)	

== Nominees distribution chart ==
Colour key
Actress won the award
Actress was nominated for the award
Actress was not nominated for the award
Actress is currently nominated for the award

Actress	Year																														Wins	Noms
Actress	1995	1996	1997	1998	1999	2000	2001	2002	2003	2004	2005	2006	2007	2009	2010	2011	2012	2013	2014	2015	2016	2017	2018	2019	2021	2022	2023	2024	2025	2026	Wins	Noms
Xiang Yun				1		2	3		N			N		4	N	N		N	N	N							5			N	5	13
Lin Meijiao	N						N	N	N			N		N		N		1						2	N	3					3	11
Hong Huifang		N	1	N		N			N	N	N	2			N				N									N			2	11
Aileen Tan															N				N			1	N	N	N		N	2			2	8
Kym Ng				N																			1		2		N				2	4
Zhu Xiufeng	1																														1	1
Zeng Huifen		1																													1	1
Yang Libing	N	N	N		1																										1	4
Chen Huihui		N		N	N	N	N	1																							1	6
Patricia Mok									1																						1	1
Li Yinzhu	N	N								1				N																	1	4
Yvonne Lim				N	N		N				1						N														1	5
May Phua										N			1																		1	2
Ng Hui													N	1			N														1	3
Constance Song												N			1		N	N													1	4
Pan Lingling																1						N									1	2
Vivian Lai										N	N						1														1	3
Rebecca Lim																			1												1	1
Joanne Peh																				1											1	1
Julie Tan																				N	1										1	2
Cynthia Koh																N								N	N	N	N		1	N	1	7
Chen Liping										N																		N		1	1	3
Bonnie Loo																					N	N	N		N	N					0	5
Paige Chua															N					N	N	N									0	4
Tracer Wong			N		N			N																							0	3
Florence Tan					N	N	N																								0	3
Sheila Sim																					N		N	N							0	3
Ya Hui																						N						N	N		0	3
Lina Ng																									N	N	N				0	3
Huang Biren			N			N																									0	2
Carole Lin									N		N																				0	2
Eelyn Kok													N	N																	0	2
Kate Pang																	N	N													0	2
Jin Yinji																		N										N			0	2
Carrie Wong																				N	N										0	2
Mei Xin																							N						N		0	2
Angela Ang	N																														0	1
Cassandra See			N																												0	1
Joey Swee								N																							0	1
Tan Kheng Hua								N																							0	1
Jesseca Liu											N																				0	1
Felicia Chin												N																			0	1
Ezann Lee													N																		0	1
Jacqueline Sue													N																		0	1
Wayne Chua														N																	0	1
Ann Kok																N															0	1
Priscelia Chan																			N												0	1
He Ying Ying																								N							0	1
Chantalle Ng																									N						0	1
Rui En																										N					0	1
Tasha Low																													N		0	1
Lynn Lim																													N		0	1
Dawn Yeoh																														N	0	1
Jojo Goh																														N	0	1

== Award records ==
Record	Actress	Count	Remarks
Most wins	Xiang Yun 向云	5 wins	1998, 2000, 2001, 2009, 2023
Most nominations	Xiang Yun 向云	13 nominations	1998, 2000, 2001, 2003, 2006, 2009, 2010, 2011, 2013, 2014, 2015, 2023, 2026
Longest gap between wins	Xiang Yun 向云	14 years	2009—2023
Shortest gap between wins (consecutive wins)	Xiang Yun 向云	1 year	2000—2001
Most nominations before first award	Lin Meijiao 林梅娇	7 nominations	Won first award (8th nomination) in 2013
Most nominations without a win	Bonnie Loo 罗美仪	5 nominations	2016, 2017, 2018, 2021, 2022
Longest gap between nominations	Kym Ng 鐘琴	20 years	1998—2018
Longest gap between nominations	Chen Liping 陈莉萍	20 years	2004—2024
Most consecutive nominations	Chen Huihui 陈慧慧	5 nominations	1998, 1999, 2000, 2001, 2002
Won at first nomination	Zhu Xiufeng 朱秀凤	7 actresses	1995
Won at first nomination	Zeng Huifen 曾慧芬	7 actresses	1996
Won at first nomination	Xiang Yun 向云	7 actresses	1998
Won at first nomination	Patricia Mok 莫小玲	7 actresses	2003
Won at first nomination	Pan Lingling 潘玲玲	7 actresses	2011
Won at first nomination	Rebecca Lim 林慧玲	7 actresses	2014
Won at first nomination	Joanne Peh 白薇秀	7 actresses	2015
Won Best Actress and Best Supporting Actress	Yvonne Lim 林湘萍	6 actresses	2007 (Best Actress); 2005 (Best Supporting Actress)
Won Best Actress and Best Supporting Actress	Joanne Peh 白薇秀	6 actresses	2009, 2012 (Best Actress); 2015 (Best Supporting Actress)
Won Best Actress and Best Supporting Actress	Rebecca Lim 林慧玲	6 actresses	2015, 2018 (Best Actress); 2014 (Best Supporting Actress)
Won Best Actress and Best Supporting Actress	Aileen Tan 陈丽贞	6 actresses	2001 (Best Actress); 2017, 2024 (Best Supporting Actress)
Won Best Actress and Best Supporting Actress	Kym Ng 鐘琴	6 actresses	2024 (Best Actress); 2018, 2021 (Best Supporting Actress)
Won Best Actress and Best Supporting Actress	Cynthia Koh 许美珍	6 actresses	1999 (Best Actress); 2025 (Best Supporting Actress)
Won Best Actress and Best Supporting Actress	Chen Liping 陈莉萍	6 actresses	2003, 2010, 2014 (Best Actress); 2026 (Best Supporting Actress)
Nominated for Best Actress and Best Supporting Actress in the same year	Zeng Huifen 曾慧芬	6 actresses	1996
Nominated for Best Actress and Best Supporting Actress in the same year	Yvonne Lim 林湘萍	6 actresses	2005
Nominated for Best Actress and Best Supporting Actress in the same year	Hong Huifang 洪慧芳	6 actresses	2010
Nominated for Best Actress and Best Supporting Actress in the same year	Rebecca Lim 林慧玲	6 actresses	2014
Nominated for Best Actress and Best Supporting Actress in the same year	Joanne Peh 白薇秀	6 actresses	2015
Nominated for Best Actress and Best Supporting Actress in the same year	Kym Ng 鐘琴	6 actresses	2021
Won Best Newcomer/Rising Star and Best Supporting Actress	Joanne Peh 白薇秀	1 actress	2004 (Best Newcomer); 2015 (Best Supporting Actress)
Nominated for Best Newcomer/Rising Star and Best Supporting Actress in the same year	Yvonne Lim 林湘萍	5 actresses	1998
Nominated for Best Newcomer/Rising Star and Best Supporting Actress in the same year	Jesseca Liu 刘子绚	5 actresses	2005
Nominated for Best Newcomer/Rising Star and Best Supporting Actress in the same year	Jacqueline Sue 徐艳玲	5 actresses	2007
Nominated for Best Newcomer/Rising Star and Best Supporting Actress in the same year	Kate Pang 庞蕾馨	5 actresses	2012
Nominated for Best Newcomer/Rising Star and Best Supporting Actress in the same year	Carrie Wong 黄思恬	5 actresses	2015
Nominated for Evergreen Artiste and Best Supporting Actress in the same year	Aileen Tan 陈丽贞	3 actresses	2017, 2019, 2023
Nominated for Evergreen Artiste and Best Supporting Actress in the same year	Lin Meijiao 林梅娇	3 actresses	2022
Nominated for Evergreen Artiste and Best Supporting Actress in the same year	Xiang Yun 向云	3 actresses	2023

== Multiple awards and nominations ==
The following individuals received two or more Best Supporting Actress awards:

Wins	Actress	Nominations
5	Xiang Yun 向云	13
3	Lin Meijiao 林梅娇	11
2	Hong Huifang 洪慧芳	11
2	Kym Ng 鐘琴	4
2	Aileen Tan 陈丽贞	8

The following individuals received two or more Best Supporting Actress nominations:

Nominations	Actress
13	Xiang Yun 向云
11	Hong Huifang 洪慧芳
11	Lin Meijiao 林梅娇
8	Aileen Tan 陈丽贞
7	Cynthia Koh 许美珍
6	Chen Huihui 陈慧慧
5	Yvonne Lim 林湘萍
5	Bonnie Loo 罗美仪
4	Paige Chua 蔡琦慧
4	Li Yinzhu 李茵珠
4	Kym Ng 鐘琴
4	Constance Song 宋怡霏
4	Yang Libing 杨莉冰
3	Vivian Lai 赖怡伶
3	Ng Hui 黄慧
3	Lina Ng 黄嫊方
3	Sheila Sim 沈琳宸
3	Florence Tan 陈秀丽
3	Tracer Wong 王裕香
3	Ya Hui 雅慧
3	Chen Liping 陈莉萍
2	Huang Biren 黄碧仁
2	Jin Yinji 金银姬
2	Eelyn Kok 郭蕙雯
2	Carole Lin 林晓佩
2	Pan Lingling 潘玲玲
2	Kate Pang 庞蕾馨
2	May Phua 潘淑钦
2	Julie Tan 陈欣淇
2	Carrie Wong 黄思恬
2	Mei Xin 美心
