= Star Awards for Special Achievement Award =

Singaporean media award

Star Awards for Special Achievement Award 特别成就奖
- Current: Star Awards 2025
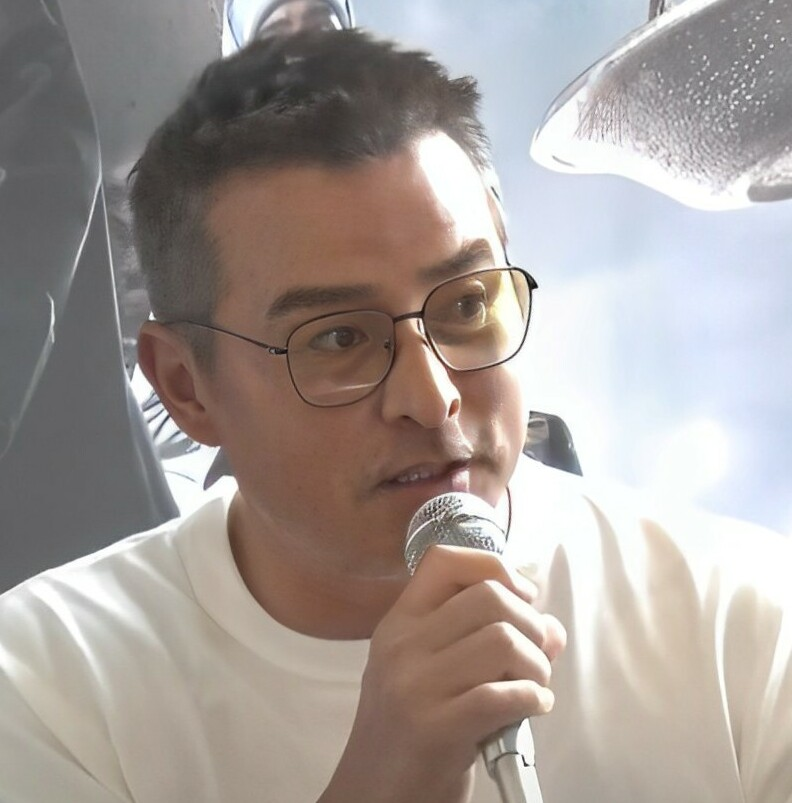
- Christopher Lee, latest winner of this award
- Awarded for: Significant contributions in the performance in his/her respective field of profession
- Country: Singapore
- Presented by: Mediacorp
- First award: 1995
- Currently held by: Christopher Lee (2025)

The Star Awards for Special Achievement Award is an award presented annually at the Star Awards, a ceremony that was established in 1994.

The category was introduced in 1995, at the 2nd Star Awards ceremony; Xiang Yun received the award for her performance and it is given in honour of a Mediacorp artiste who have made significant contributions in the performance of his/her respective field of profession over the past few years. Winners are selected by a majority vote from the entire judging panel.

The award was initially discontinued from 2004, but was revived in 2018.

Since its inception, the award has been given to thirteen artistes. Christopher Lee is the most recent winner in this category.

== Recipients ==
Year	Recipient	Ref
1995	Xiang Yun	
1996	Bai Yan	
1997	Huang Wenyong	
1998	Zoe Tay	
1999	Jack Neo	
2000	Fann Wong	
2001	Lee Shih Shiong	
2001	Lee Wei Song	
2002	Chen Shucheng	
2003	Xie Shaoguang	
2018	Marcus Chin	
2019	Chew Chor Meng	
2024	Mark Lee	
2025	Christopher Lee	
