= Li Yinzhu =

Singaporean actress (born 1949)

- Born: 14 September 1949 (age 77); Fujian, China
- Occupation: Actress
- Years active: 1969–present

Chinese name
- Traditional Chinese: 李茵珠
- Simplified Chinese: 李茵珠
- Hanyu Pinyin: Lǐ Yīnzhū

Li Yinzhu (born 14 September 1949) is a Singaporean actress. She has been in the entertainment industry since 1969 and has filmed more than 150 drama serials.

== Career ==
In 1980, Li signed with Singapore Broadcasting Corporation to be its first batch of actors. After contracting dengue fever in 2010 and subsequent health issues, she left Mediacorp in 2010 but continued to act on contract basis.

== Personal life ==
Li was born in Fujian, China. She left China with her mother and two elder brothers when she was young.

Li has 2 daughters.

== Filmography ==
=== Television series ===
| Year | Title | Role | Notes | Ref |
|---|---|---|---|---|
| 1981 | Spring is Always Green (悲欢年华) | Xue Zhen | | |
| 1982 | Seletar Robbery (实里达大劫案) | Meng Di | | |
| 1982 | Mother's Birthday Present (一束花) | | | |
| 1982 | Little DD (小DD) | Ke Lilng | | |
| 1983 | Army Series (新兵小传) | Xu Mali | Cameo | |
| 1983 | Endless Knots (情结) | | | |
| 1983 | The Way to Judo (蒲公英) | | | |
| 1983 | Glass Boat (玻璃船) | | | |
| 1983 | A Breakfast Story (早餐的故事) | | | |
| 1983 | CID '83 (狮城勇探) | Qin Baolian | | |
| 1984 | Spice of Life (四日谈 之《花圃的秘密》) | Zhang Ma | | |
| 1984 | Spice of Life (四日谈 之《心眼》) | A-mei | | |
| 1984 | Young and Innocent (小无知) | | | |
| 1984 | The Awakening 2 (雾锁南洋 之《风雨同舟》) | Su Shaoying | | |
| 1984 | Pursuit (怒海萍踪) | Shuang Qiang Huang Ying | | |
| 1985 | Tycoon (豪门内外) | | | |
| 1985 | The Young Heroes (少年英雄) | | | |
| 1985 | Home is where Love is (吾爱吾家) | | | |
| 1986 | The Happy Trio (青春123) | Zhou Huilan | | |
| 1986 | Samsui Women | Sister Ying | | |
| 1986 | Neighbours (芝麻绿豆) | | | |
| 1986 | The Bond (天涯同命鸟) | Gao Chunniang | | |
| 1987 | Five Foot Way (五脚基) | Sister Lan | | |
| 1987 | Painted Faces (戏班) | Wang Zheming's mother | | |
| 1987 | Strange Encounters (奇缘 之《辗转红尘》) | Zha Kangnian's mother | | |
| 1987 | Strange Encounters (奇缘 之《塞外胡笳》) | Huo Nian's mother | | |
| 1987 | Pickpockets (提防小手) | | | |
| 1988 | Silk and Satin (云想衣裳) | Qin Meng | | |
| 1988 | On the Fringe (边缘少年) | Ma Liqin | | |
| 1988 | The Last Applause (舞榭歌台) | Guan Ruomei | | |
| 1988 | We are Family (四代同堂) | Jin Zhi | | |
| 1989 | When Hearts Touch (似水柔情) | Xia Yu | | |
| 1989 | Song of Youth (生活歌手) | Li Yulan | | |
| 1989 | Magic of Dance (鼓舞青春) | | | |
| 1989 | Turn of the Tide (浮沉) | Zhou A-qiao | | |
| 1990 | Friends Next Door (我爱芳邻) | | | |
| 1990 | When Dawn Breaks (乱世黎明) | Nun Sister Cai | Cameo | |
| 1990 | Starting Over (暖流) | | | |
| 1990 | Journey's End (生命街车) | Zhuang Tiansheng's mother | Cameo | |
| 1990 | Happy World (多多富贵多多情) | Xiao Tongluo's mother | Cameo | |
| 1991 | Behind Bars (铁狱雷霆) | Su Yumei | | |
| 1991 | Golden Shenton Way (金色珊顿道) | Zhou Suying | | |
| 1991 | The Other Woman (醋劲100) | Xia Wenyi's mother | | |
| 1991 | Pretty Faces (三面夏娃) | Yang Zhi | | |
| 1992 | The Dating Game (爱情乒乓球) | Peng Li's mother | | |
| 1992 | A Time To Dance (火舞风云) | Chen Fengling | | |
| 1992 | Between Friends (山水喜相逢) | Aunt Lan | | |
| 1992 | Duel in Shanghai (轰天龙虎) | Du Huijun | | |
| 1992 | Terms of Endearment (戏剧人生) | Du Yunxian | | |
| 1993 | Heavenly Beings (再战封神榜) | He Xiangu | | |
| 1993 | Hidden Truth (法网情天) | Ding Lihua | | |
| 1993 | Sister Dearest (傻妹俏娇娃) | Chen A-jiao | | |
| 1993 | The Witty Advisor (金牌师爷) | Yu Niang | | |
| 1994 | Double Life (潇洒走一回) | Wang Zhaojun | | |
| 1994 | Those Were The Days (生命擂台) | Liu Yueqin | | |
| 1994 | Young Justice Bao (侠义包公) | Mother's of Emperor Xiao | | |
| 1994 | Larceny of Love (雌雄大盗) | Chen Xiujiao | | |
| 1994 | Fiery of Lover (烈火情人) | Granny | | |
| 1994 | Against All Odds (共闯荆途) | Li Hongfan's mother | | |
| 1994 | Dr Justice (法医故事 之《阁楼凶影》) | Ding Baoping | | |
| 1995 | Neighbourhood Heroes (大英雄小人物) | Chen Tiancheng's mother | | |
| 1995 | Deep Within My Heart (爱在心处) | Guo Hong | | |
| 1995 | Strange Encounters III (奇缘III 之《灶神》) | Gu Sanniang | | |
| 1995 | Strange Encounters III (奇缘III 之《深水情郎》) | Madam Geke | | |
| 1995 | The Teochew Family (潮州家族) | Zhang Yalan | | |
| 1995 | The Golden Pillow (金枕头) | Jin Meiji | | |
| 1996 | Waves of Courage (逐浪青春) | Liang Peiyun | | |
| 1996 | A Different Live (妈姐情缘) | Huang Xia | | |
| 1996 | Brave New World (新阿郎) | Xu Caixia | | |
| 1997 | Crimes and Tribulations (狮城奇案录之丽人巧骗) | Yu Susu's mother | | |
| 1997 | The Silver Lining (骤雨骄阳) | Li Sanmei | | |
| 1997 | The Guest People | Granny Gui Hua | | |
| 1998 | Taxi Driver (德士司机) | | | |
| 1998 | Driven by a Car (欲望街车) | Hong Laijiao | | |
| 1998 | Singapore Short Stories (小说剧场 之《报应》) | Yingjie's mother | | |
| 1998 | Singapore Short Stories 2 (小说剧场 II 之《梦幻之屋》) | Zheng Shun's mother | | |
| 1998 | Riding the Storm (陌生人) | Aunt Shun | | |
| 1998 | Legend of the Eight Immortals | Queen Mother of Heaven | | |
| 1999 | From the Medical Files 2 (医生档案II) | Li Yuning | | |
| 1999 | Back to School (摩登状元) | Hong Laijiao | | |
| 1999 | Wok of Life | Jia Sao | | |
| 1999 | Darling-In-Law (我的岳母是巫婆) | Yao Meixiang | | |
| 1999 | P.I. Blues (乌龙档案) | Chen A-hua | | |
| 2000 | Knotty Liaisons (爱情百科) | Zheng Yihang's mother | | |
| 2000 | My Home Affairs (家事) | Aunt Xia | | |
| 2000 | The Legendary Swordsman | Master Dingyi | | |
| 2001 | The Stratagem (世纪攻略) | Ye Kaishuang's mother | | |
| 2001 | Heroes in Black (我来也) | Queen | | |
| 2001 | Love Me, Love Me Not (真爱无敌) | Lin Yiqin's Mother | | |
| 2001 | Through Thick and Thin (阿灿正传) | A-Can'smother | | |
| 2002 | Vive La Famille (好儿好女) | Zeng Shixuan | | |
| 2002 | No Problem! (考试家族) | Yang A-jiao | | |
| 2002 | Kopi-O II | Yang Xiuzhu | | |
| 2002 | Springs of Life | | | |
| 2003 | Lobang King (我是Lobang King) | Headmistress | Cameo | |
| 2003 | Vive La Famille 2 (好儿好女2) | Zeng Shixuan | | |
| 2003 | True Heroes | Irene's grandma | | |
| 2003 | Baby Boom (我家四个宝) | Chen A-mei | | |
| 2003 | Always on My Mind (无炎的爱) | | | |
| 2004 | The Crime Hunters | Fang Jiesi's mother | | |
| 2004 | Chronicles of Life (我爱我家真情实录) | Zhang Shuyu | | |
| 2004 | Man at Forty (跑吧！男人) | Wang Bi'e | | |
| 2004 | A Child's Hope II | Ah Feng | | |
| 2004 | Room in My Heart (真心蜜语) | Zhu Lilian | | |
| 2004 | Timeless Gift (遗情未了) | Pan Xiuping | | |
| 2004 | My Mighty-in-Laws | Jin Yayin | | |
| 2005 | Zero To Hero | Wang Guiji | | |
| 2005 | Destiny | Fan Yining's mother | | |
| 2006 | Measure of Man | Liu Xuehua | | |
| 2006 | Life Story (人生旅途之雨后彩虹) | Nanz's mother | | |
| 2007 | The Peak (最高点) | Xiuping's mother | | |
| 2007 | Making Miracles | Li Xiaoman's mother | | |
| 2007 | Mars vs Venus | Zhu Yayu | | |
| 2007 | Kinship (手足) | Hong Zhaoyang's mother | | |
| 2007 | Honour and Passion | Aunt Feng | | |
| 2007 | Dear, Dear Son-in-Law | Zhou Meibao | | |
| 2007 | Kinship | Hong Zhaoyang's Mother | | |
| 2008 | Just in Singapore | Automatic Auntie | | |
| 2008 | Rhythm of Life | | | |
| 2008 | The Little Nyonya | Madame Chen | | |
| 2010 | Happy Family | Aunt Chen | | |
| 2016 | Eat Already? | Auntie Wang | | |
| 2016 | Don't Worry, Be Healthy | Chen Liniang | | |
| 2017 | Eat Already? 2 | Auntie Wang | | |
| 2023 | All That Glitters | Granny Leigong | | |

=== Film ===
| Year | Title | Role | Notes | Ref |
|---|---|---|---|---|
| 2016 | Provision Shop | Madam Goh | Television featurette | |

== Theatre ==
| Year | Title | Role | Notes | Ref |
|---|---|---|---|---|
| 2017 | | Madam Goh | | |

== Awards and nominations ==
| Year | Ceremony | Category | Nominated work | Result |
|---|---|---|---|---|
| 1995 | Star Awards 1995 | Best Supporting Actress | Dr Justice | Nominated |
| 1996 | Star Awards 1996 | Best Supporting Actress | Waves of Courage | Nominated |
| 2004 | Star Awards 2004 | Best Supporting Actress | A Child's Hope II (as Ya Feng) | Won |
| 2007 | Star Awards 2007 | Best Evergreen Veteran | —N/a | Won |
| 2009 | Star Awards 2009 | Best Supporting Actress | The Little Nyonya (as Madame Chen) | Nominated |
