= Xie Shaoguang =

Singaporean actor (born 1961)

- Born: Cha Shao Kwong; 15 September 1961 (age 65); Colony of Singapore
- Occupations: Actor; chef; former monk
- Years active: 1989–2005, 2024–present
- Awards: Full list

Chinese name
- Traditional Chinese: 謝韶光
- Simplified Chinese: 谢韶光
- Hanyu Pinyin: Xiè Sháoguāng

Cha Shao-kwong (born 15 September 1961), professionally known as Xie Shaoguang, is a Singaporean actor, chef and former monk best known for acting in many Chinese-language television series produced by MediaCorp Channel 8. He was prominently a full-time Mediacorp artiste from 1989 to 2005. He re-signed with MediaCorp on 5 September 2024, citing possible future projects.

Widely regarded as one of Singapore's best actors, Xie received five Star Awards for Best Actor, a record that he held for 15 years for the most wins in that category before being surpassed by Chen Hanwei in 2019.

== Career ==
Since the start of his acting career in 1989 in the television series A Mother's Love (亲心唤我心), Xie has received numerous accolades, including winning the Star Awards Best Actor award five times and the Best Supporting Actor award twice since the ceremony's inception in 1994. One of his most notable roles is the Chinese folk deity Ji Gong in the 1997 television series The Legends of Jigong.

In 2005, Xie formalised his plans to retire from the entertainment industry when he decided not to renew his contract which expired in September the same year, although his intention to quit has been made known years earlier. He said that after retirement, he would be living in Malaysia, where he planned to open a refuge for stray dogs and cats. His last screen appearance was in the television series Baby Blues, which ended its run on 9 September 2005.

After a 12-year hiatus, Xie made a short official media appearance on 14 October 2017 to conduct acting classes for younger actors. Xie has stated he would return to acting, if there is a role that can persuade him to do so.

In 2024, he signed with The Celebrity Agency seeking for new acting roles after being persuaded by his former manager, Ivy Low who's now the head of the management agency. In his comeback role, Xie played a lonely wealthy tycoon Lin Huoyan with Chen Hanwei in a 20 episode drama series titled The Gift of Time produced between February and May 2025. In February 2026, Xie stated that he remains in semi-retirement and declined to attend Star Awards 2026.

== Personal life ==
Xie kept a low-profile following his initial departure from the entertainment industry, refusing any requests to appear in public events or on screen, including an invitation by Singaporean director Anthony Chen to star in the award-winning film Ilo Ilo.

Xie would later move to Permas Jaya, Malaysia, where he was ordained as a Buddhist monk in 2013. In 2014, Xie opened an animal welfare centre, Animal Paradise, in Pekan Nanas, Johor.

In 2016, Singaporean media reported that Xie renounced his monkhood and had become a head chef in a vegetarian restaurant. Xie moved back to Singapore prior to the COVID-19 pandemic.

== Filmography ==
=== Television series ===
| Year | Title | Role | Notes | Ref |
|---|---|---|---|---|
| 1989 | A Mother's Love (親心喚我心) | He Jiale's husband | | |
| 1990 | Friends Next Door (我愛芳鄰) | Li Yaochang | | |
| 1990 | Two of Us (天生一對) | | | |
| 1990 | By My Side (逆風天使) | Zhiwei | | |
| 1990 | Wishing Well (幻海奇遇之六尺儿童) | Bing | | |
| 1990 | Navy Series (壯志豪情) | Li Yi-an | | |
| 1990 | Marry Me (最佳配偶) | Liu Ri-hua | | |
| 1990 | Enchanted Eyes (天眼) | Xiaoliu | | |
| 1990 | Happy World | Mr Fang | | |
| 1991 | The Working Class (上班一族) | | | |
| 1991 | Fatal Endearment (謀海危情) | Chen Gang | | |
| 1991 | Behind Bars (铁狱雷霆) | Pang Yuda | | |
| 1991 | Private Eyes (妙探智多星) | Johnny He | | |
| 1991 | Black Phoenix (黑凤凰) | Junding | | |
| 1991 | The Future is Mine (錦繡前程) | Michael | | |
| 1992 | Changing Fortune (天賜奇才) | Hou Yizong | | |
| 1992 | Ladies in Action (霹靂紅唇) | Yuan Zhenhua | | |
| 1992 | A Time to Dance (火舞風雲) | Simon Luo Tianhu | | |
| 1992 | My Buddies (浪漫战场) | Zhang Liangxing | | |
| 1992 | Between Friends (山水喜相逢) | Wang Xiangdong | | |
| 1992 | Duel in ShangHai (轰天龙虎) | Yan Zhiping | | |
| 1993 | Smouldering Heat (赤道迷情) | Huang Yaman | | |
| 1993 | Angel of Vengeance (暴雨狂花) | Long Jun | | |
| 1993 | Reaching For The Stars (银海惊涛) | Albert | | |
| 1993 | Ride the Waves (卿本佳人) | Huo Chenggui | | |
| 1993 | The Great Conspiracy (蓮花爭霸) | Ye Qun | | |
| 1993 | Switch (妙鬼临门) | Ben | | |
| 1993 | The Unbeatables I | Feng Jiang | | |
| 1994 | Double Life (潇洒走一回) | Zhao Yong | | |
| 1994 | Those Were The Days (生命擂台) | Paul | | |
| 1994 | Larceny Of Love (雌雄大盜) | Jiang Zefu | | |
| 1994 | Challenger (勇者無懼) | Zhong Shaoliang | | |
| 1994 | Against All Odds (共闯荊途) | Rong Bochuan | | |
| 1997 | The Legends of Jigong | Ji Gong | | |
| 1998 | Stand by Me | Du Hanmin | | |
| 1999 | Stepping Out | Zhang Jiafu | | |
| 2002 | Beautiful Connection | Lion King | | |
| 2003 | Holland V | Yang Xiong | | |
| 2004 | Double Happiness | Luo Jialong | | |
| 2004 | Double Happiness II | Luo Jialong | | |
| 2004 | I Love My Home | Xu Chuanye | | |
| 2005 | Baby Blues | Lan Haishen | | |
| 2025 | The Gift of Time (你好，再见） | Lin Huoyan | | |

=== Film ===
| Year | Title | Role | Ref |
|---|---|---|---|
| 2002 | Miracle Pub (奇蹟酒吧之白粉仔) | Dong Zhongxing | |
| 2003 | Destiny (愛之國．仇恨島) | Shi Shusheng / Ding Lingqi | |

=== Variety show hosting ===
| Year | Title | Ref |
|---|---|---|
| 2005 | Rail Adventure (男得風光) | |

== Awards and nominations ==
| Year | Association | Category | Nominated work | Result | Ref |
|---|---|---|---|---|---|
| 1995 | Star Awards | Best Supporting Actor | Larceny of Love (as Jiang Zefu) | Won | |
| 1995 | Star Awards | Top 5 Most Popular Male Artistes | —N/a | Won | |
| 1996 | Star Awards | Best Supporting Actor | Golden Pillow (as Sai Wei) | Won | |
| 1996 | Star Awards | Best Actor | The Last Rhythm (as Junxiong) | Won | |
| 1996 | Star Awards | Top 5 Most Popular Male Artistes | —N/a | Won | |
| 1997 | Star Awards | Best Actor | The Legends of Ji Gong (as Luo Han) | Nominated | |
| 1997 | Star Awards | Top 10 Most Popular Male Artistes | —N/a | Won | |
| 1998 | Star Awards | Best Actor | Stand by Me (as Du Hanmin) | Won | |
| 1998 | Star Awards | Top 10 Most Popular Male Artistes | —N/a | Won | |
| 1999 | Star Awards | Best Actor | Stepping Out (as Zhang Jiafu) | Won | |
| 1999 | Star Awards | Top 10 Most Popular Male Artistes | —N/a | Won | |
| 2000 | Star Awards | Top 10 Most Popular Male Artistes | —N/a | Won | |
| 2001 | Star Awards | Top 10 Most Popular Male Artistes | —N/a | Won | |
| 2002 | Star Awards | Best Actor | Beautiful Connection (as Lion King) | Nominated | |
| 2002 | Star Awards | Top 10 Most Popular Male Artistes | —N/a | Won | |
| 2003 | Star Awards | Best Actor | Holland V (as Yang Xiong) | Won | |
| 2003 | Star Awards | Special Achievement Award | —N/a | Won | |
| 2003 | Star Awards | Top 10 Most Popular Male Artistes | —N/a | Won | |
| 2004 | Star Awards | Best Actor | Double Happiness (as Luo Jialong) | Won | |
| 2004 | Star Awards | Top 10 Most Popular Male Artistes | —N/a | Won | |
| 2005 | Star Awards | All-Time Favourite Artiste | —N/a | Won | |
| 2007 | Star Awards | My Favourite Actor | —N/a | Won | |
| 2007 | Star Awards | Favourite On-screen Couple | —N/a | Won | |
