= Tofu Street =

- Also known as: Tofu Street
- 豆腐街
- Genre: Drama
- Written by: Ang Eng Tee
- Starring: Cynthia Koh; Peter Yu; Ix Shen; Brandon Wong; Jacelyn Tay; He Yong Fang; Zheng Geping; Carole Lin
- Opening theme: 城里的月光
- Country of origin: Singapore
- Original language: Mandarin
- No. of seasons: 1
- No. of episodes: 25

Production
- Producer: Kok Len Shoong

Original release
- Network: TCS Channel 8
- Release: 1996 – 1996

Tofu Street (Chinese: 豆腐街) is a 1996 Singaporean Chinese-language drama series.

The series stars Cynthia Koh, Peter Yu, Ix Shen, Brandon Wong, Jacelyn Tay, He Yong Fang, Zheng Geping and Carole Lin. The series' theme song, 'Moonlight in the City', was sung by Mavis Hee.

It won the first Star Awards for Best Drama Serial at the Star Awards, an annual awards given by Mediacorp.

== Cast ==
- Cynthia Koh as Liang Simei
- Peter Yu as Song Yizhe
- Ix Shen
- Brandon Wong
- Jacelyn Tay as Bai Shuixian
- He Yong Fang
- Zheng Geping
- Carole Lin
- Chen Huihui
- Ryan Choo
- Mavis Hee
- Samuel Tan as Luo Tou
- Chen Huihui as Auntie Wonton
- Fu Youming
- Chen An Na

== Production ==
The series' producer is Kok Len Shoong.

== Accolades ==
Year	Ceremony	Category	Nominated work	Result	Ref
1996	Star Awards	Best Drama Serial	—N/a	Won	

== Legacy ==
The cast reunited on The Reunion (小团剧) in 2023, reflecting on their experiences during filming. It was broadcast across 2 episodes.
