= List of The Golden Path characters =

This article contains character information for the Singaporean television drama series The Golden Path.

== Main ==
=== Huang Family ===
==== Xiao Gu ====
- Portrayed by Chen Liping
- Occupation: Food Restaurant Operator
- Appeared in: Episode 1-30

Xiao Gu, whose real name is Su Lifang (苏丽芳), is the matriarch of the family. A native of Kedah in Malaysia, she came to Singapore before the series started, and married Ah Shun. Together, they sold cooked foods for a living. Later, Ah Shun died of a grave, unspecified illness, and left Xiao Gu juggling with three small children, as well as the responsibility for their livelihood. Eventually, Xiao Gu expanded her food operation to a roadside stall. Xiao Gu, in accordance with her late husband's wishes, named the stall "Happy Restaurant" (幸福飯店).

Xiao Gu eventually met her second husband, Ah Jin, after he saved her life in a dangerous situation. Xiao Gu and Ah Jin eventually grew close, and decides to get married. However, it was later revealed that Ah Jin, who claims to be a sailor, was a thief who, along with two other people, perpetrated the largest Jewellery Store robbery since Singaporean Independence. Ah Jin's whereabouts was eventually tipped off by Xiao Gu's son, Kaijie, and Ah Jin was surrounded by police on his wedding day with Xiao Gu. Ah Jin chose to commit suicide rather than be arrested.

Xiao Gu eventually expanded her food business, and by 1995, Happy Restaurant became a moderately famous restaurant in Singapore. Xiao Gu also bought a food bazaar and a coffee shop to further expand her business empire. However, the money that was used to expand her empire was ill-gotten: It was actually the stolen loot from Ah Jin's robbery, which Ah Jin had revealed to her before he killed himself.

Towards the end of the series, Xiao Gu realized that these ill-gotten wealth caused her sons and daughters untold misery, so she decided to sell off all her businesses, and restart her business elsewhere.

==== Ah Shun ====
- Portrayed by Yang Xinquan
- Occupation: Food Business Operator
- Appeared in: Episode 1 (Flashback)

Ah Shun is only seen in flashbacks. He married Xiao Gu at an unspecified time, and together, they sold cooked foods for a living. Ah Shun suffered from a grave, but unspecified illness before the start of the series, and consequently died. He has connections to the local triads, as his friend, Ah Cheng, helped him out with medical costs.

==== Kaida ====
- Portrayed by Tan Yong Ming (Child), Chew Chor Meng (Adult)
- Occupation: Student (Episode 1-6), Doctor (Episode 7-20), Mental Hospital Patient/Unemployed (Episode 21 onwards)
- Appeared in: Episode 1-30

Kaida is one of the most academically inclined member of the family, eventually attending medical school and becoming a doctor. Personally, he was on good terms with Jinlong, who, since his father's suicide, harboured misgivings against the Huangs. Jinfeng's eventual murder by Kaijie, and Kaida's role in the eventual cover-up, caused him great emotional stress, and drove him to a mental breakdown, which cost Kaida his medical practice, and his girlfriend, Shimin. After his mental breakdown, Kaida helped out Xiao Gu with her restaurant operations, but he did little in his line of work, and spent much time watching television (just as Jinfeng did when she was helping out Xiao Gu).

==== Kaijie ====
- Portrayed by Ma Weihan (Youth), Tay Ping Hui (Adult)
- Occupation: Student (Episode 1-6), Lawyer (in internship) (Episode 7-??), Police Officer, Lawyer
- Appeared in: Episode 1-30

Kaijie is the main villain in the series. Cunning but financially inclined, he became a lawyer, despite neglecting his academic studies during his youth. He despised the Jins, as he believed Ah Jin's criminal past brought shame to the Huangs. In the subsequent years, he made a small fortune in financial and property transactions, and eventually bought an apartment flat, which he used to house Jinfeng when she escaped from the Huangs. Jinfeng and Kaijie eventually developed an affair, and Jinfeng was made pregnant by Kaijie. Desperate to hide this hideous fact, and determined to gain the love and trust of Lin Fei (who comes from a wealthy family), he pushed Jinfeng overboard during a yacht trip. Jinfeng fell into a coma and eventually succumbed to her injuries.

==== Kaiqi ====
- Portrayed by Lao Yuting (Youth), Joanne Peh (Adult)
- Occupation: Student (Episode 1-20), Broadcast Journalist (Episode 21 onwards)
- Appeared in: Episode 1-30

Kaiqi is the youngest member of the Huang family. A justice-minded individual since her youth, she eventually became a broadcast journalist. She is the only person in her family (perhaps beside Kaida) who can get through to the hotheaded and stubborn Jinlong. Despite her unlucky streak in romance during her University days, she eventually married David (portrayed by Nat Ho), who is a dentist.

=== Jin Family ===
==== Ah Jin ====
- Portrayed by Li Nanxing
- Occupation: Sailor (claimed), Fugitive Robber (actual)
- Appeared in: Episode 1-6

The personal history of Ah Jin is not well known, although he claims he is a sailor, which means he is away from his family for long periods of time. However, the claim is fake, as Ah Jin is actually a robber who participated in the largest jewellery store since Singaporean Independence. His accomplices also killed a few police officers, as well as a gravely injured accomplice. Ah Jin, as well as the surviving accomplice, buried the jewellery obtained from the heist in an undisclosed location and went into hiding, as arrest would almost certainly mean death (Singaporean law allows the death penalty for murder and firearm robbery). He saved Xiao Gu from almost certain death, and the two grew close together after Ah Jin moved into Xiao Gu's apartment complex. When the two decided to get married, Kaijie, determined not to allow Ah Jin to do so, dug up Ah Jin's criminal past, and tipped off his whereabouts to police. When Ah Jin was surrounded by police, he committed suicide, rather than letting the police arrest him. However, before he died, he told Xiao Gu the whereabouts of the stashed jewellery, which allowed Xiao Gu to dig up the jewellery and eventually use them to finance her business.

==== Jinlong ====
- Portrayed by Fraser Tiong (Youth), Li Nanxing (Adult)
- Occupation: Student (Episodes 1-6), Restaurant Delivery Boy (Episodes 6-20), Prisoner, Loan Shark (Episodes 20-26)
- Appeared in: Episode 1-30

==== Jinfeng ====
- Portrayed by Huang Xingyi (Youth), Joey Feng (Adult)
- Occupation: Student (Episodes 1-6), Television Actress
- Appeared in: Episode 1-20
