= Star Awards 1995 =

Singaporean television awards

- Date: 9 July 1995
- Location: TCS TV Theatre, Singapore
- Hosted by: Guo Liang; Yvette Tsui

Television/radio coverage
- Network: Television Corporation of Singapore Channel 8
- Produced by: Lin Peiqin; Wen Shusen
- Directed by: Li Yiwen

Star Awards 1995 is the second edition of the annual Star Awards presented by the Television Corporation of Singapore to honour its artistes who work on Channel 8. A total of 21 awards were given out at the ceremony, with addition of 5 new categories where winners were selected by a panel of judges.

== Winners and nominees ==
Winners are listed first, highlighted in boldface, and indicated with a double dagger (‡).

**Special Achievement Award**: **Xiang Yun ‡**
**Most Popular Drama Serial**: **Chronicle of Life** ‡	**Most Popular Telemovie**: **Fatal Memory** ‡
**Best Actor**: **Li Nanxing − Wounded Tracks as Xu Le ‡**; Terence Cao — The Challenger as Lin Yongjie; Chen Hanwei — Twin Bliss as Xia Letian; Chew Chor Meng — Challenge of Truth as Lin Haoming; Huang Wenyong — Homes in 168 as Zhuo Tieshu	**Best Actress**: **Fann Wong − Chronicle of Life as Fang Ling ‡**; Chen Liping — Heartbeat as Jiang Tong; Aileen Tan — The Blazing Trail as Li Shali; Zoe Tay — Love Dowry as Min; Zeng Huifen — A Chance of Life as Lin Aili
**Best Supporting Actor**: **Xie Shaoguang − Larceny of Love as Jiang Zefu ‡**; Chen Shucheng — Strange Encounters as Cai Hong; Richard Low — Coffee or Tea as Gu Qi; Zhang Xinxiang — Young Justice Bao as Zhan Zhao; Zhu Houren — Thunder Plot as Ren Yonggang	**Best Supporting Actress**: **Zhu Xiufeng − Chronicle of Life as Old Madam Jiang ‡**; Angela Ang — Veil of Darkness as Hetian Meizi; Li Yinzhu — Dr Justice as Ding Baoping; Lin Meijiao — Silk of Love as Zhou Anyi; Yang Libing — Challenge of Truth as Yu Zhenzhen
**Top 5 Most Popular Male Actor**: **Chen Hanwei**; **Xie Shaoguang**; **Thomas Ong**; **Chew Chor Meng**; **Li Nanxing ‡**; Terence Cao; Chunyu Shanshan; San Yow; Sean Say; Peter Yu	**Top 5 Most Popular Female Actor**: **Zoe Tay**; **Chen Liping**; **Ivy Lee**; **Fann Wong**; **Ann Kok ‡**; Cynthia Koh; Lina Ng; Pan Lingling; Aileen Tan; Xiang Yun
**Most Popular Male Actor**: **Chen Hanwei ‡**; Xie Shaoguang; Thomas Ong; Chew Chor Meng; Li Nanxing	**Most Popular Female Actress**: **Zoe Tay ‡**; Chen Liping; Ivy Lee; Fann Wong; Ann Kok
**Most Popular Newcomer**: **Fann Wong ‡**; Jason Oh; Thomas Ong; Bernard Tan; Gregory Tan; Henry Tee; Raymond Yong; Michelle Chia; Alvina Wong	**Most Popular Theme Song**: "我总是听你说" ("**Wo Zong Shi Ting Ni Shuo** ") ‡ from Dream Hunters. Written and performed by Jimmy Ye
