= Airforce (TV series) =

- 空军
- Genre: Military; Action
- Created by: Jiang Long 江龙
- Written by: Li Weijian 李维健 卢智明
- Starring: Li Nanxing; Chen Tianwen; Zheng Geping; Hong Guorui; Huang Wenyong
- Opening theme: 一飞冲天 sung by Wu Jiaming 吴佳明
- Ending theme: 知己 sung by Wu Jiaming 吴佳明
- Country of origin: Singapore
- Original language: Mandarin
- No. of episodes: 7

Production
- Producer: Ou Yusheng 区玉盛
- Running time: approx. 45 min

Original release
- Network: SBC
- Release: 10 April 1988 – May 1988

Airforce (空军) is a Singapore Chinese miniseries produced by the SBC in 1988. It was the first military themed drama produced in Singapore and produced in collaboration with the Ministry of Defence. The drama featured the Republic of Singapore Air Force (RSSAF) and its aircraft such as the Northrop F-5, Aermacchi S-211 and Aermacchi SF.260. Most scenes were filmed on-site at Changi Airport and its adjoining air base. The series creator was Jiang Long, who also co-created the 1984 classic period drama The Awakening. The miniseries was later dubbed in English for broadcast on SBC 5 in April 1989 as a strategy by SBC to air the English dubbed version of a Mandarin serial first before the actual serial was shown. The dub had received positive viewer response.

It was one of several SBC drama series re-aired on Channel 8 in 2007 as part of Mediacorp's anniversary celebrating 25 years of local Chinese drama production.

== Plot ==
The series revolves around several young RSAF trainee pilots who aspire to become full-fledged pilots. As they are put through the rigorous training, they learn valuable lessons about friendship, teamwork and perseverance.

== Cast ==
- Li Nanxing as Li Zhengting 李政庭
- Chen Tianwen as Wu Hongfa 吴鸿发
- Li Wenhai as Lu Wenbiao 陆文彪
- Huang Wenyong as Commander Kuang Guozhong 邝国忠
- Zhu Houren as Commander Zhu 朱司令
- Richard Low as Capt Liu 刘上尉
- Wang Yuqing as Liu Shaohui 刘绍辉
- Chen Liping as Lian Xueyin 连雪音
- Lin Meijiao as Mali 玛丽
- Zheng Wanling as Shanshan 珊珊
- Yang Libing as Meiqi 美琪
- Wu Weiqiang as Lian Ziheng 连子恒
- Xiang Yun as Fang Zijun 方紫筠
- Hong Guorui as Capt Xu Shengwu 徐胜武
- Zheng Geping as Zhao Feiying 赵飞鹰
- Edmund Chen as Thomas Gan 甘奇峰
- Liang Tian as Zhao's father 赵父
- Steven Woon as Zhao's father colleague 赵父同僚
- Bryan Chan as Zhao's father colleague 赵父同僚
- Ye Shipin as flying instructor 飞行教官
- Li Yinzhu as Qian Meiyi 钱美仪
- Chen Xiuhuan as Chris
- Wang Guangwu

== Production ==
The drama consisted of six individual stories with each story lasting one episode except for the second story, giving a total of seven episodes. As the running time of each episode is longer than the typical SBC's drama, it was described as a mini telemovie for each story.

== Soundtrack ==
The opening and closing theme songs, "一飞冲天" and "知己" were sung by Wu Jiaming 吴佳明. The opening theme song was composed by Roy Li.
