= Star Awards 2013 =

Singaporean television awards

Star Awards 2013 红星大奖2013
- Date: 21 April 2013 – Show 1; 28 April 2013 – Show 2
- Location: Show 1: Mediacorp TV Theatre; Walk of Fame, Show 2 and Post-show: Marina Bay Sands
- Country: Singapore
- Hosted by: Show 1: Pornsak; Lee Teng; Vivian Lai; Kate Pang; Jeffery Xu; Walk of Fame: Dasmond Koh; Vivian Lai; Lee Teng; Kate Pang; Show 2: Guo Liang; Quan Yi Fong

Highlights
- Most awards: Drama: Unriddle 2 (5); Variety/Info-ed: Find Me A Singaporean (season 3); Star Awards 2012 (2 each)
- Most nominations: Drama: Joys of Life (13); Variety/Info-ed: Jobs Around the World (5)
- Best Drama: Pillow Talk
- Best Variety Show: Body SOS
- Honorary TV Award: Huang Wenyong
- Website: "Official website". Archived from the original on 18 March 2014.

Television/radio coverage
- Network: Mediacorp Channel 8 Mediacorp Channel U
- Runtime: 180 mins (both presentations); 60 mins (Walk of Fame and Post-show)

Star Awards 2013 (Chinese: 红星大奖 2013) was a double television award ceremony held in Singapore. It is part of the annual Star Awards organised by Mediacorp for the two free-to-air channels, Mediacorp Channel 8 and Mediacorp Channel U. Star Awards 2013 was broadcast live on Channel 8, on 21 April 2013 and 28 April 2013. The first ceremony was held at the Mediacorp TV Theatre while the second ceremony was held at the Marina Bay Sands. The ceremonies were also broadcast on 8 International and the second ceremony on Astro AEC & Astro Quan Jia HD for the first time in HD.

20 programs (eight dramas, nine variety/info-ed, and three current affair programs) won at least one award, the largest representation of programs with one awards tying the last year's ceremony's count. Best Drama Serial Pillow Talk won only one award, its lowest count of awards for a winning Drama Serial, while Unriddle 2 won the most awards for the ceremony with five (two were from the big four major acting categories, and three from Show 1). Joys of Life won three awards out of the largest count of nominations for the ceremony (13), all awarded from Show 1. Only two variety/info-ed programs won multiple awards, which were the third season's Find Me A Singaporean and the last year's Star Awards ceremony, the latter retaining the three-year winning streak for Best Variety Special.

This was the second ceremony since 2007 to not present the All-Time Favourite Artiste, in its place was the newly introduced Honorary TV Award. This is currently the last ceremony to date where awards for "Best News Presenter" and "Best Current Affairs Presenter" were presented, ending a tradition that began in 2000.

== Programme details ==
Date	Shows	Time	Channel	Simulcast on	Venue
21 April 2013	Star Awards 2013 Show 1	7pm to 10 pm	Mediacorp Channel 8	Mediacorp 8 International	Mediacorp TV Theatre
28 April 2013	Star Awards 2013 Walk of Fame	5.30 pm to 6.30 pm	Mediacorp Channel 8	Mediacorp 8 International	Marina Bay Sands Expo and Convention Centre
28 April 2013	Star Awards 2013 Show 2	7pm to 10 pm	Mediacorp Channel 8	Mediacorp 8 International; Astro AEC; Astro Quan Jia HD	Marina Bay Sands Grand Theatre
28 April 2013	Star Awards 2013 Post Show Party	10pm to 11 pm	Mediacorp Channel U	Mediacorp 8 International	Marina Bay Sands Grand Theatre Lobby

=== Notes ===
- Representatives listed are only applicable to the awarded title, and need not be mentioned in the Hall of Fame.
- ^{1} A representative will collect the award in place of the nominee.
- Unless otherwise stated, the winners are listed first, highlighted in **boldface**.

== Show 1 ==
The first show, titled "亮闪八方" (Shining Light) was broadcast on 21 April 2013 at the Mediacorp Studios at Caldecott Hill.

In place of the usual opener, artistes and nominated backstage personnel were directly ushered to their seats on Show 1, in view of a special tribute for late television icon Huang Wenyong, who died the previous day. A five-minute segment begins with host Lee Teng delivering his eulogy, then 30 seconds of silence was observed, and a video of his contributions was played. The show later opened after a commercial break at 7.08 pm.

=== Professionally judged awards ===
**Young Talent Award**: **Lyn Oh Ling En – It Takes Two as Hao Meishan 郝美珊**; Jason Lee Kok Yang – Double Bonus as Little Handsome God 小帅神; Lieu Yan Xi – Poetic Justice as Liu Qingzi 刘晴子; Lorraine Koh Jia Xin – Joys of Life as Han Meimei 韩美美; Tan Mei Kee – Jump! as Fu Xiaomin 傅晓敏	**Best Theme Song**: **Power Station – Joys of Life – 《珍惜》**; Tay Kewei and Wei En – Don't Stop Believin' – 《真善美》; Derrick Hoh and Kelvin Tan – It Takes Two – 《轧》; Kelvin Tan – Show Hand – 《分岔口》; Olivia Ong – Yours Fatefully – 《幸福记号》
**Best Director**: **Chen Yi You – Unriddle 2**; Doreen Yap – It Takes Two; Loh Woon Woon – Unriddle 2; Loo Yin Kam – Joys of Life; Wong Foong Hwee – Poetic Justice	**Best Screenplay**: **Lau Ching Poon and Cynthia Chong Mei Ying – Don't Stop Believin'**; Ang Eng Tee – It Takes Two; Phang Kai Yee – Unriddle 2; Rebecca Leow – Pillow Talk; Seah Choon Guan, Lim Gim Lan and Tan Ai Heng – Joys of Life
**Best Variety Producer 最佳综艺编导**: **Kerlin Teo – Share Something**; Gan Bee Khim – S.N.A.P.; Glen Lim – Thye Hua Kwan Charity Show 2012; Jean Toh – Jobs Around The World; Kerry Soh – Bliss Seeker	**Best Variety Research Writer**: **Lam Yen Fong – Star Awards 2012**; Lim Kar Yee – Star Reunion; Loong Li Li – Jobs Around The World; Tay Lay Tin – Street Smart; Wong Eng Hong – Bliss Seeker
**Best Programme Promo**: **Danny Loh Boon Kiat – Borders**; **Loo Li Min – Battle @ Water Margin**; Chan Hsueh Li – Show Hand; Liew Lee Ming – Jump!; Terence Lee – Campus SuperStar (Recruitment Campaign)	**Best Drama Cameraman**: **Toh Meng Teck – Unriddle 2**; Lee Heng Soon Tommy – Joys of Life; Lee Heng Soon Tommy – Poetic Justice; Wong Kwok Chung Steve – Pillow Talk; Wong Kwok Chung Steve – Yours Fatefully
**Best Costume & Image Design**: **Xu Ying Ying – Joys of Life**; Annie Chua – Lunar New Year's Eve Special 2012; Justin Lee – Poetic Justice; Justin Lee 李振安 – Channel 8 Countdown 2013 @ Vivocity; Xu Ying Ying – Pillow Talk	**Best Music & Sound Design**: **Zheng Kai Hua – Joys of Life**; Gao Jun Wei 高俊伟 – Yours Fatefully; Teng Kim Lian – Food Source 3; Thong Meng Sun and Matthew Teng – Poetic Justice; Wong Lee Chin – The Quarters
**Best News Story**: **Evelyn Lam Li Ting – ATM Account Hack**; Hu Jielan – Fake Diploma; Lip Kwok Wai – Genneva Gold Scam; Ng Lian Cheong – $1 Hawker Stall; Seet Sok Hwee – Rivervale Plaza
**Best Current Affairs Story**: **Yap Li Ling – Frontline – Scratch & Win?**; Eg Yik Fan – Money Week – Old Place With New Vibes; Leck Chye Peng – Focus – Those Memories Of Yesteryear; Loh Jing Ting – Frontline – More Young Women Binge Drinking; Pang Kia Nian and Leck Chye Peng – Focus – Malaysia Bersih 3.0 Rally

=== Awards eligible for voting ===
**Favourite Male Character**: **Xu Bin – Don't Stop Believin' as Zhong Jun Liang 钟俊良**; Aloysius Pang – It Takes Two as Hao Zhijie 郝志杰; Romeo Tan – It Takes Two as Fish Prince 鱼王子; Christopher Lee – Game Plan as Zeng Haoren 曾浩仁; Alien Huang ^{1} – Joys of Life as Zhao Mingxing 赵明星	**Favourite Female Character**: **Rui En – Poetic Justice as Liu Yanzhi 刘言之**; Kimberly Chia – Don't Stop Believin' as Deng Yilin 邓怡琳; Felicia Chin – Don't Stop Believin' as Du Siman 杜思曼; Rebecca Lim – Poetic Justice as Feng Luoling 冯洛凌; Ann Kok – It Takes Two as Vivian
**Favourite On-screen Couple (Drama)**: **Elvin Ng and Rui En – Unriddle 2**; Zheng Geping and Ann Kok – It Takes Two; Dai Xiangyu and Zhou Ying – The Quarters; Christopher Lee and Jesseca Liu – Game Plan; Rui En and Alien Huang – Joys of Life	**Favourite Variety Host**: **Bryan Wong – S.N.A.P.**; Dennis Chew – Battle @ Water Margin; Kate Pang – My Fair Ladies; Lee Teng – Let's Talk 3; Pornsak – Food Source 3

=== Rocket award ===
**Rocket Award**	**Romeo Tan**

=== Viewership awards ===
**Top Rated Drama Serial 2013**	**Don't Stop Believin'**
**Top Rated Variety Series 2013**	**Food Source (season 3)**

== Show 2 ==
The second show was broadcast on 28 April 2013 at the Marina Bay Sands Grand Theatre.

=== Professionally judged awards ===
**Best Drama Serial**: **Pillow Talk**; Don't Stop Believin'; Game Plan; Poetic Justice; Unriddle 2	**Best Variety Programme**: **Body SOS**; Jobs Around the World; Star Reunion; Street Smart; United Neighbours Society
**Best Variety Special**: **Star Awards 2012 Show 1**; Channel 8 Countdown 2013 @ Vivocity; Lunar New Year's Eve Special 2012; Star Awards 2012 Show 2; Thye Hua Kwan Charity Show 2012	**Best Info-ed Programme**: **Find Me A Singaporean 3**; Stories; The Banquet; The Era of Rising to Fame; Tuesday Report 2012 – A Taste of Life 2
**Best Actor**: **Christopher Lee – Show Hand as Zhang Qiming 张启明**; Chew Chor Meng – Joys of Life as Zhao Dagou 赵大狗; Dai Xiangyu – Poetic Justice as Fang Zhengye 方正业; Pierre Png – Pillow Talk as He Tingkai 何廷凯; Thomas Ong – Pillow Talk as Zhang Qiuyu 张秋雨	**Best Actress**: **Rui En – Unriddle 2 as Hu Xiaoman 胡小曼**; Cynthia Koh – Show Hand as Wu Meifang 吴美芳; Joanne Peh – Pillow Talk as Zhang Qiuxue 张秋雪; Kym Ng – It Takes Two as Luo Na 罗娜; Rebecca Lim – Unriddle 2 as Gao Jieyu 高婕妤
**Best Supporting Actor**: **Tay Ping Hui – Unriddle 2 as Zhang Yuze 张雨泽**; Huang Wenyong ^{1} – Joys of Life as Han Jianren 韩健仁; Rayson Tan – It Takes Two as Zhang Yang 张扬; Romeo Tan – Joys of Life as Qian Erduo 钱二多; Zhu Houren – Pillow Talk as Zhang Qian 张谦	**Best Supporting Actress**: **Lin Meijiao – Game Plan as Zhang Shiyun 张诗云**; Constance Song – Don't Stop Believin' as Li Shenchun 李圣春; Jin Yinji – It Takes Two as Youcai's mum 有财妈; Kate Pang – Joys of Life as Sun Lianjing 孙廉菁; Xiang Yun – Pillow Talk as Mao Yunling 毛蕴岭
**Best Variety Show Host**: **Kym Ng – Jobs Around The World**; Bryan Wong – Jobs Around The World; Cavin Soh – Knock! Knock! Who's There?; Guo Liang – United Neighbours Society; Pornsak – Food Source 3	**Best Info-ed Programme Host**: **Belinda Lee – Find Me A Singaporean 3**; Bryan Wong – Makan Unlimited; Guo Liang – Project i (Season 2); Lee Teng – Life's Big Factories; Christina Lim – Let's Talk 3
**Best News Presenter (Channel 8 News)**: **Zhao Wenbei**; Lin Chi Yuan; Tung Soo Hua; Zhang Haijie; Zhao Quanyin	**Best Current Affairs Presenter**: **Chun Guek Lay – Focus**; **Tung Soo Hua – Money Week**; Desmond Lim Soo Guan – Good Morning Singapore!; Youyi – Good Morning Singapore!; Qi Qi – Good Morning Singapore!
**Best Newcomer Award**: **Ian Fang – Don't Stop Believin' as Bai Zhixiang 白志翔**; Edwin Goh – Don't Stop Believin' as Cai Wensheng 蔡文胜; Elizabeth Lee – Show Hand as Coco; Jayley Woo – Jump! as Liu Haiyan "Yen" 刘海燕; Shane Pow – It Takes Two as B Niu B牛

=== Awards eligible for voting ===
**BottomSlim Sexiest Legs Award BottomSlim 最性感美腿奖**
- **Ann Kok**
  - Joanne Peh
  - Rebecca Lim
  - Belinda Lee
  - Yvonne Lim

=== Special award ===
The Honorary TV award is introduced as a special achievement award given out posthumously to past artiste(s) to honour contributions made to the local TV industry. The wife and daughter of Huang Wenyong represented the late television icon to receive the Honorary TV Award in recognition of his contributions to Singapore's television industry.

**Honorary TV Award**	**Huang Wenyong**

=== Top 10 awards ===
Similar to previous ceremonies, The Top 10 Most Popular Male Artistes and Top 10 Most Popular Female Artistes will be decided by telepoll and online voting; each carrying a 50% weightage towards the final result. The telepoll lines was announced and opened on 15 March 2013, and would run until 28 April at 8.30 pm. The temporary results (Top n) are not publicized on TV but through the Toggle Now app, which users can download from the App Store or Google Play.

The nominees are listed in telepoll line order. The results of the Top 10 awards are not in rank order.

Note	Description
Italic	New to list (Not nominated last year).
**Bold**	Awardees who made it to the Show 2 top 10.
	Made it to top 10 in the week / Fall under the Top n category.
n	How many of this awards the awardee got.
**10**	To be awarded the All-Time Favourite Artiste in the next Star Awards.

Top 10 Most Popular Male Artistes
Richard Low	
Zhu Houren	
**Dennis Chew**	4
Pierre Png	
Terence Cao	
**Huang Wenyong** ^{1, 2}	2^{3}
Thomas Ong	
Yao Wen Long	
**Zheng Geping**	5
Qi Yuwu	
**Dasmond Koh**	7
**Dai Yang Tian**	2
Chen Shucheng	
**Pornsak**	3
Guo Liang	
**Chen Hanwei**	**10**
**Bryan Wong**	**10**
**Elvin Ng**	7
**Lee Teng**	1
Romeo Tan	
Top 10 Most Popular Female Artistes
**Yvonne Lim**	6
Zhou Ying	
**Belinda Lee**	1
**Jeanette Aw**	9
Pan Lingling	
Jin Yinji	
**Kym Ng**	6
Hong Huifang	
**Rebecca Lim**	2
**Quan Yi Fong**	7
**Joanne Peh**	7
**Rui En**	8
Julie Tan	
**Vivian Lai**	9
**Ann Kok**	8
Priscelia Chan	
Christina Lim	
Paige Chua	
Tracy Lee	
Lin Mei Jiao	

^{2} Proceeds from the "Top 10 Most Popular Male Artistes" calls for Huang Wenyong will be donated to HCA Hospice.

^{3} Xiang Yun represented Huang to collect the award.

== Post show party awards ==
**i Weelky Most Stylish (Male)**: **Elvin Ng**	**i Weelky Most Stylish (Female)**: **Rui En**
**Perfect Body Award**: **Belinda Lee**	**Y.E.S. 93.3FM Award**: **Lin Meijiao**

== Summary of nominations and awards (by programme genre) ==
=== Most nominations ===
Programs that received multiple nominations are listed below, by number of nominations per work:

Drama Series	Nominations
Joys of Life	13
It Takes Two	12
Don't Stop Believin'	10
Pillow Talk	9
Poetic Justice	9
Unriddle 2	9
Show Hand 注定	5
Game Plan	4
Jump!	3
Yours Fatefully	3
The Quarters	2

Variety/Info-ed	Nominations
Jobs Around the World 走遍天涯打工乐	5
Food Source 3 食在好源头	4
Focus 焦点	3
Good Morning Singapore! 早安您好!	3
Star Awards 2012	3
Battle @ Water Margin 我爱水浒转	2
Bliss Seeker 另一片天空	2
Channel 8 Countdown 2013 @ Vivocity 8频道跨年派对	2
Find Me A Singaporean 3 稀游记3	2
Frontline前线追踪	2
Let's Talk 3 你在囧什么?! 3	2
Lunar New Year's Eve Special 2012 金龙腾飞庆丰年	2
Money Week 财经追击	2
S.N.A.P. 熠熠星光总动员	2
Star Reunion 那些年，我们一起看电视	2
Street Smart 自由脚步	2
Thye Hua Kwan Charity Show 2012 太和观 一心一德为善乐	2
United Neighbours Society 邻里合作社	2

=== Most wins ===
Drama Series	Wins
Unriddle 2 最火搭档2	5
Don't Stop Believin' 我们等你	4
Joys of Life 花样人间	3
Game Plan 千方百计	1
It Takes Two 对对碰	1
Pillow Talk 再见单人床	1
Poetic Justice 微笑正义	1
Show Hand 注定	1

Variety/Info-ed	Wins
Find Me A Singaporean 3 稀游记3	2
Star Awards 2012 红星大奖2012	2
Battle @ Water Margin 我爱水浒转	1
Body SOS 小毛病 大问题	1
Borders 边城故事	1
Focus 焦点	1
Food Source 3 食在好源头	1
Frontline 前线追踪	1
Jobs Around the World 走遍天涯打工乐	1
Money Week 财经追击	1
Share Something 我爱公开	1
S.N.A.P. 熠熠星光总动员	1

== Presenters and performers ==
The following individuals presented awards or performed musical numbers.

=== Show 1 ===
Artistes / Special guests	Presented / Performed
Lee Teng 李腾	Gave a monologue In Memoriam of Huang Wenyong
Zoe Tay 郑惠玉; Rebecca Lim 林慧玲	Presenter for the award for Best Programme Promo
Bryan Wong 王禄江; Tan Jun Sheng 陈俊生	Presenter for the award for Young Talent Award
Eric Ng 黄韵仁; Jim Lim 林倛玉	Presenter for the award for Best Music & Sound Design
Tay Ping Hui 郑斌辉; Zheng Geping 郑各评	Presenter for the award for Best Drama Cameraman
Ann Kok 郭舒贤; Yvonne Lim 林湘萍	Presenter for the award for Best Costume & Image Design
Will Pan 潘玮柏	Presenter for the award for Best Theme Song
MICappella	Performed 《珍惜》 (from Joys of Life)
Mediacorp CEO; Shaun Seow 萧文光	Presenters for the awards for Best News Story and Best Current Affairs Story
Guo Liang 郭亮; Quan Yi Fong 权怡凤	Presenters for the award for Favourite On-screen Couple (Drama)
Guo Liang 郭亮; Quan Yi Fong 权怡凤; Mark Lee 李国煌; Dasmond Koh 许振荣; Ben Yeo 杨志龙; Vivian Lai 赖怡伶; Cavin Soh 苏梽诚 (Special appearance by Zoe Tay 郑惠玉)	Presented a skit of We Also Love the Stars (我们也爱红星) and award for Favourite Variety Host
Clifton Ko 高志森	Presenter for the awards for Best Variety Producer and Best Variety Research Writer
Will Pan 潘玮柏	Performed 《反转地球》, 《壁虎漫步》 and 《24个比利》
Raymond Wong 黃百鳴; Clifton Ko 高志森	Presenter for the awards for Best Screenplay and Best Director
Jin Yinji 金银姬; Tracy Lee 李美玲; Lin Meijiao 林梅娇; Kate Pang 庞蕾馨; Felicia Chin 陈凤玲	Gave monologues for each nomination for Favourite Male Character
Chen Shucheng 陈澍承	Presenter for the award for Favourite Male Character
Mediacorp chairman Teo Ming Kian 张铭坚	Gave out awards for Top Rated Drama Serial and Top Rated Variety Series
Elvin Ng 黄俊雄; Cavin Soh 苏梽诚; Guo Liang 郭亮; Yuan Shuai 袁帅; Zheng Geping 郑各评	Gave monologues for each nomination for Favourite Female Character
Chen Liping 陈莉萍	Presenter for the award for Favourite Female Character
Senior Parliamentary Secretary, Education and Law; Sim Ann 沈颖	Gave out the award for Rocket Award

=== Show 2 ===
Artistes / Special guests	Presented / Performed
Tan Hwee Yi 陈慧怡 from Kids Performing Centre of the Arts	Performed When You Wish Upon a Star
Tan Jun Sheng 陈俊生; Jia Jia 加加	Gave Opening Monologue
Ellien Chai Ee Juang 蔡宇妆	Performed 《雾锁南洋》 (from The Awakening)
Xiang Yun 向云	Gave a monologue In Memoriam of Huang Wenyong
Acting Minister, Culture, Community and Youth, and Senior Minister of State, Ministry of Information, Communications & the Arts; Lawrence Wong 黄循财	Gave out awards for Honorary TV Award and Best Drama Serial
Joanne Peh 白薇秀; Bianca Bai 白歆惠	Presenters for the awards for Best Info-ed Programme and Best Info-ed Programme Host
Wang Wei Zhong 王伟忠; Jack Neo 梁智强	Presenters for the awards for Best Variety Programme and Best Variety Special
Cast of Ah Boys to Men; Chen Han Dian 陈汉典	Presenters for the award for Best Newcomer Award
Christine Ng 伍咏薇; Lawrence Cheng 郑丹瑞	Presenter for the awards for Best Supporting Actress and Best Supporting Actor
Madeleine Park 林嘉瑞; Tupitsyna Larisa	Performed 《城里的月光》
Chen Shucheng 陈澍承; Tan Jun Sheng 陈俊生	Presented a skit in tribute to nominations of Best Drama Serial
Shen Chun Hua 沈春华	Presenter for the awards for Best Current Affairs Presenter and Best News Presenter
Flame of the Forest	Performed 《看电视》
Hsu Nai-lin 徐乃麟	Presenter for the award for Best Variety Show Host
Michael Hui 许冠文	Presenter for the award for Best Actress and Best Actor
Cha Tae-hyun 车太贤; Chris Wang 王宥勝	Presenters for the award for Top 10 Most Popular Female Artistes
Fann Wong 范文芳; Lynn Hung 熊黛林	Presenters for the award for Top 10 Most Popular Male Artistes (first five)
Zoe Tay 郑惠玉; Linda Chung 鍾嘉欣	Presenters for the award for Top 10 Most Popular Male Artistes (last five)

== Ceremony information ==
The day before the first show, Huang Wenyong died of lymphoma, and a eulogy was presented before the show 1 began. The following ceremony a week after, after Huang was posthumously awarded the Honorary TV Award by acting cabinet minister (and later as Prime Minister) Lawrence Wong, given as representation to his wife and daughter Wenwen, the show announced that any votes cast for Huang from the "Top 10 Most Popular Male Artistes" calls will proceed donations to HCA Hospice. Prior to the announcement that Huang would win its second and the other Top 10 since 2011, several shouts of Huang could be heard as only one award was left to be given out. Representative Xiang Yun praised the viewers live and thanked them for voting, and mentioned that nominations for the Top 10 are not easy and are fiercely fought throughout each year; Xiang told that it was Huang's final award, and encouraged the viewers on appreciation to a certain character through love and esteem, which received a standing ovation. This was the only time where the award was presented to date; the award did not return in 2019, although there was a tribute to one artiste, Aloysius Pang, who had died earlier on 23 January that year.

The opening monologue by Young Artiste recipient Tan Jun Sheng and Jia Jia was also well praised by media, which brought several references in the current trends of 2013, including a cold open of Tan parodying Yam Ah Mee, then-returning officer at the time, and several celebrity gossips, including John Quek's announcer role. After Guo Liang and Quan Yifeng were introduced on stage, the hosts praised the artistes on their potential before the children return backstage; Guo even lampshade the awards being a "junior spin-off" and starting an official "adult version".

=== Consecutive nominees and awardees, firsts in Top 10 ===
- The nominees for the "Best Current Affairs Presenter" award are the same throughout four consecutive years from 2010 to 2013. Two awardees received the award consecutively twice from 2012, and Chun Guek Lay was being awarded for the second consecutive time.
  - A rule revision in 2014 revised the criteria that the award will only be presented if a quota (of 10 nominations minimum) is fulfilled for that particular category; due to this change, three categories will be suspended in the following ceremony, namely "Best Newcomer" (now Best Rising Star), "Best News Presenter" and "Best Current Affairs Presenter".
    - Although the Channel 8 News & Current Affairs had at least ten presenters at the end of 2014, this year was currently the last time both the "Best News Presenter" and "Best Current Affairs Presenter" had been presented as of 2026. However, "Best Newcomer" will be presented again in 2015, with the exception for 2016, 2017 and 2022.
- Rui En was awarded the Most Favourite Female Character award for the third consecutive year. En and Elvin Ng were, for their second consecutive year, awarded the Most Favourite Onscreen Couple award.
- Bryan Wong was awarded the Most Favourite Variety Show Host award for the second consecutive year.
- This was the first time Belinda Lee and Lee Teng were awarded the Top 10 Most Popular Female and Male Artistes award, respectively.
  - Dai Xiangyu received his second Top 10 Most Popular Male Artistes award since 2010.
- The second season of Unriddle become the sixth drama to receive multiple nominations for the Best Drama Serial.

== Accolades ==
The 2013 ceremony won all three nominations, which were Best Set Design, Best Variety Research Writer and Best Variety Special, on the following ceremony next year; for the latter it was Star Awards fifth win for the Best Variety Special, and the fourth consecutive time on doing so.

Organisation	Year	Category	Nominee	Result	Ref
Star Awards	2014	Best Set Design 最佳综艺布景设计奖	Ahyak Yahya	Won	
Star Awards	2014	Best Variety Research Writer	Lim Shiong Chiang 林雄强	Won	
Star Awards	2014	Best Variety Special	—N/a	Won	

== See also ==
- List of programmes broadcast by Mediacorp Channel 8
- Mediacorp Channel 8
- Mediacorp Channel U
- Star Awards
