= The Golden Path (TV series) =

- 黄金路
- Genre: Modern drama
- Written by: Ang Eng Tee 洪荣狄
- Directed by: Chong Liung Man 张龙敏
- Starring: Li Nanxing; Chen Liping; Tay Ping Hui; Joanne Peh; Felicia Chin; Chew Chor Meng; Huang Wenyong; Alan Tern; Wayne Chua; Joey Feng; Priscelia Chan
- Opening theme: 路 (The Path) by Mi Lu Bing
- Ending theme: 舍不得 (Cannot Forget) by Mi Lu Bing
- Country of origin: Singapore
- Original language: Chinese
- No. of episodes: 30

Production
- Producer: Chia Mien Yang 谢敏洋
- Running time: 45 mins (approx.)

Original release
- Network: MediaCorp Channel 8
- Release: 11 December 2007 – 21 January 2008

The Golden Path (Chinese: 黄金路) is a 30-episode drama serial. Set in 1982 and spanning 25 years, it tells the story of a family embroiled in conflicts of interest, webs of deceit, love, hatred and vengeance. The drama was produced by Mediacorp in celebration of the company's 25 years of local Chinese drama production and incorporates scenes from past dramas such as The Seletar Robbery, The Flying Fish, Pretty Faces, Turn of the Tide, Finishing Lines, The Last Applause, Stepping Out, The Golden Pillow and Holland V.

The series was telecast on MediaCorp TV Channel 8, weekdays at 9:00pm from 11 December 2007 to 21 January 2008.

== Meaning of title ==
As the series revolves around the pursuit of wealth (or at the very least, basic financial stability), the series was named to reflect that. Coincidentally, and perhaps intentionally, the first two characters of the Chinese title, "黄" and "金", are the surnames of the two main families in the series. In that sense, the title would mean "The path travelled by the Huangs and the Jins".

== Cast ==
=== Huang Family ===
==== First generation ====
| Cast | Role | Description |
|---|---|---|
| Chen Liping | Xiao-gu | The pivotal character of the entire series. She is the matriarch of the Ng family. Xiao Gu's first husband, Ah Shun (阿順), died early, forcing her to raise her three children alone. She planned on marrying Ah Jin, and after he committed suicide from a police confrontation, she adopted his two children. Although having an optimistic outlook in life and the people around her, Xiao Gu harbored a darker secret - She did not give up Ah Jin's ill-gotten gains to the police, but instead used them to fund her business. As the years passed, she grew to believe that the gods had cursed her family for her greed, and sold off her shop in the end to appease her own guilt and in hopes that she can break the curse on her feuding sons. |
| Yang Xinquan | Ah Shun | The first husband of Xiao-gu. He died before the start of the series in 1982, and appeared only in flashbacks. His connections with the criminal underworld almost cost Xiao-gu's life very early on in the series. |

==== Second generation ====
- Chew Chor Meng as Huang Kaida (Ng Kiat Teck) 黄凯达
  Young version portrayed by Tan Yong Ming (陈勇铭)
  The eldest son of Xiao-gu. Always the most academically inclined member of the family, he became a medical student, and served as a doctor at a local hospital. He possess a knack for ending violent confrontations by talking down the potential aggressor, making him useful whenever Jinlong gets into trouble. When Kaida discovered the crime his brother Kaiji, had committed, he covered up for his brother. The pressure of such a cover-up drove Kaida to insanity, costing him his medical licence, although he eventually recovered. Later, he persuaded Jinlong to spare Kaijie at the very last minute after learning that Jinlong wanted to avenge Bak Kut girl.

| Cast | Role | Description |
|---|---|---|
| Tay Ping Hui | Huang Kaijie (Ng Kiat Keet) | (黄凯杰), young version portrayed by Warren Beh (马纬翰)- The youngest son of Xiao-gu and the main antagonist of the show. He has always been the person who resorted to unscrupulous methods to attain his goals. He, along with neighbour Fatty Ying, tipped off police as to the real identity of Ah Jin, thus causing Ah Jin's death. Although Kaijie had lagged academically in his youth, he attended university, and entered the police force after graduating with a degree in law. He has a love interest in his own adopted sister, Jinfeng, but when he made her pregnant, Kaijie accidentally pushed Jinfeng into the sea during a cruise, which eventually killed her. He married Lin Fei despite the latter's affections for Jinlong, but the marriage deteriorated irreversibly when she found out that Kaijie is responsible for Jinfeng's death. Kaijie went into hiding after his crimes were investigated by his superiors, and was killed by an assassin sent by Lin Fei. |
| Joanne Peh | Huang Kaiqi (Ng Kiat Ghee) | (黄凯琪), The only daughter of Xiao-gu, Kaiqi is a good-natured, justice-minded individual who aspires to be a journalist. She was only one who could communicate with Jinlong. When she discovered Jinlong's exploits in the underworld, she tried to persuade Jinlong to leave the underworld and return to the family, without avail. She marries David (Nathaniel Ho), who is a computer scientist, and becomes a mother in the later years. |

=== Jin Family ===
==== First generation ====
- Li Nanxing as Ah Jin
  A criminal who participated in one of the biggest jewelry store heist in Singaporean history. Xiao-gu decided to marry him, not knowing his criminal background. Ah jin was pursued by the police on their day of their marriage after a tip-off from Xiao-gu's second son, Kaijie. His children Jinlong and Jinfeng were entrusted in her care after he committed suicide with a gunshot.

==== Second generation ====
| Cast | Role | Description |
|---|---|---|
| Li Nanxing (李南星) | Jinlong (金龙) (Kim Leng) | Younger version portrayed by Fraser Tiong is the son of Ah Jin and the show's anti-hero protagonist, he was entrusted in Xiao-gu's care after Ah Jin committed suicide. Throughout the series, Jinlong was resentful towards the Xiao-gu's family because of his perception that Xiao-gu was responsible for his father's death and that she used his jewelry heist loots as a springboard for her future business successes. He had a love interest towards Huang Kaiqi, but eventually left the family after the death of his sister, Jinfeng. While he and Lin Fei showed mutual affection for each other, the relationship did not last as he felt insecure and inadequate being with a woman far wealthier than he is. He initially joined the triads to feed his own drug habit, but continued working in the underworld even after kicking it. In the underworld society, he met and married Bak Kut Girl. When Bak Kut Girl is killed by Kaijie after a failed attempt to expose his crimes, Jinlong swore revenge on Kaijie, but spared him at the last moment and left. With his only love gone, Jinlong commits suicide in the same way his father did, in a twist of ironic fate. |
| Joey Feng (冯瑾瑜) | Jinfeng (金凤) (Kim Fong) | The only daughter of Ah Jin. She had been, in contrast to her brother, on endearing terms with Xiao-gu's family. She was not academically inclined, and always dreamt of being a celebrity. She was the first love interest of Kaijie, who made her pregnant. Refusing to acknowledge the relationship, and unwilling to give up his chance at millions of dollars with Lin Fei, during an argument at a cruise, Kaijie accidentally pushed Jinfeng into the ocean, which put Jinfeng into a coma that eventually killed her along with her unborn child. |

=== Other characters ===
==== 1982 Era ====
| Cast | Role | Description |
|---|---|---|
| May Oon (温丽玲) | Ah Ying 阿英 | Minor Antagonist; The wife of Ah Lin. She operated a wanton store alongside Xiao-gu's cookery stall. She was a gossip-monger with a bitter attitude towards everyone around her. Ah Ying held Xiao-gu responsible for Ah Lin's insanity, and became hostile towards her after her husband's arrest. She appeared several times throughout the show, often weaving a cleaver at Xiao-gu and threatening her. |
| Wang Yuqing | Ah Lin (阿林) | The husband of Ah Ying. He is a cowardly man, and frequently abused by Ah Ying. This drove him into becoming the "Oily Man" (油鬼仔): a man covered in motor oil who rapes women across town. When Jinlong found out, he attempted to blackmail Ah Lin, but Ah Lin could not come up with the money, and went insane. After chasing Jinlong, Kaiqi, and Kaijie across Chinatown with a butcher's knife, Ah Lin was arrested and committed to a mental institution. Years later he recovered, began a life without his dominating and demanding wife, operating a Karung guni business. He also helped Jinlong when the latter was on the run after being set up by Kaijie. |
| Li Wenhai (李文海) | Chua Ah Hai (蔡阿海, known as Lao Cai (老蔡), | A police officer in Chinatown, a well-meaning but seemingly muddle-headed man who doesn't gave much thought to the idea of Ah Jin being the robber. |
| Edmund Chen (陈之财) | Chen Ge (成哥) | A close friend of both Xiao-gu and her deceased first husband, Ah Shun. He helped them out when Ah Shun was gravely ill. He was a member of the triads, and was betrayed and murdered by his wife's lover, Ah She in the first episode. Before he died, he entrusted a key to his hidden ill-gotten money to Xiao-gu via Jinlong. The money was presumably destroyed in a house fire during a struggle between Xiao-gu and Ah She, but it was revealed that Xiao-gu managed to salvage some. |
| | Ah She (阿蛇) | The lover of Chen Ge's wife. He ordered the killing of Chen Ge, and when he and Chen Ge's wife found out about the key to the safe that Chen Ge gave to Xiao-gu, they kidnapped Xiao-gu and Kaijie. They safe was found at an abandoned house, full of money, but a scuffle between Xiao-gu and Ah She broke out, and a fire was subsequently started (with the original intent to kill Xiao-gu and Kaijie). Ah She died in the blaze. |
| Joey Swee (徐绮) | Chen Sao (成嫂) | literally "The Wife of Chen", She had an affair with one of the members of her husband's triad. She collaborated with her lover, Ah She, to murder Chen Ge and set their hands on his ill-gotten riches. When they discovered that the key to the safe that held the money was in Xiao-gu's hands, they kidnapped both Xiao Gu and Kaijie. The money was discovered, but it was mostly lost in a fire set by Ah She in an attempt to kill Xiao Gu and Kaijie. Xiao-gu, after escaping the house with Kaijie, returned into the burning house to save her life. |

==== 1995 era ====
| Cast | Role | Description |
|---|---|---|
| Felicia Chin (陈凤玲) | Lin Fei (林菲) | Born into a rich family, Lin Fei suffered from a grave illness with a bone marrow transplant only possible from Jinlong to save her life. She fell for Jinlong first, but married Kaijie after some misunderstandings arose between Lin Fei and Jinlong. Despite that, she still had feelings for Jinlong, and was in a dilemma after she found out about the dark secret Kaijie has been hiding for years. In the ending, it was implied that she hired an assassin to kill her husband Kaijie, and moved on with her own life, raising their child by herself. |
| Wayne Chua (蔡佩璇) | Bak Kut Girl (肉骨妹), real name Feng Zhen (冯真) | A runaway from Kelantan, Malaysia, she received a scar during a dispute about the money she owed. In order to repay the debt her own way, she joined the triads in Singapore by working at Jinlong's grandfather's bak kut teh stall. She received a scar on her face from ais rough and brute, but caring for her friends inside. She became the love interest for Jinlong and eventually married him. She was killed by Kaijie, but not before leaving behind a note pointing him as her murderer, thus precipitating Kaijie's downfall. |
| Huang Wenyong (黄文永) | Lin Desheng (林德生) | A famous lawyer in Singapore, his investments have earned him millions of dollars. Aware of his daughter Lin Fei's grave illness, he dotes on her and gives her free will to do anything she wants. When she was saved by Jinlong via a successful bone marrow transplant operation, he was grateful to Jinlong but had mixed feelings about Lin Fei and Jinlong's relationship. |
| Priscelia Chan (曾诗梅) | Lu Simin (卢思敏) | Love interest of Kaida. Kaida ended the relationship after he found out she was a witchdoctor who had been charming him with spells. She eventually married a colleague (played by Priscelia's real-life husband Alan Tern). |
| Zhang Wei | Grandpa | The grandfather of Jinlong, he is actually a triad boss masquerading as a simple hawker by running a Bak Kut Teh stall, employing Bak Kut Girl along as well. His love of gambling got him in much financial troubles with loan sharks, and had to be bailed out by Jinlong. |

==== 2003 era ====
- Zheng Geping as Hai-ge (海哥), the triad boss of Jinlong
- Yan Bingliang as Uncle Biao, former triad boss and elder
- Luis Lim as Old Monkey (老Monkey), rival gang member
- Huang Yiliang as Su Ma (苏马), top lawyer in Singapore

== Synopsis ==
=== 1982 ===
==== Introduction ====
The series began in Chinatown in 1982, where Xiao-gu, a young widow with 3 children (Kaida, Kaijie, and Kaiqi), opened and operated the "Happy Restaurant" (幸福飯店) hawker stall to earn a living. Xiao-gu is an optimistic woman, even after the death of her husband and her tight financial situation.

One night, Xiao-gu was visited by Jinlong to pass her a key given by Ah Chen, a triad member who helped Xiao-gu when Xiao-gu's husband, Ah Shun, was dying from an illness. Ah Chen was killed by fellow triad member, Ah She, with Kaijie and Jinlong witnessing the murder. When Ah She and Chen-sao, the wife of Ah Chen and was having an affair with Ah She, discovered Xiao-gu's knowledge about the events and possession of the key, they attempted to kill her and Kaijie, but the attempt was thwarted by a mysterious man. Ah She gave up on his murder attempts, but kidnapped Kaijie to force Xiao-gu to give up the key she received. The key, as it turned out, led to a cashbox that was stashed in an abandoned house. The safe contained tens of thousands of dollars in cash. When Ah She and Cheng-sao opened the safe and emptied its contents, Ah She doused the house with petrol in a final attempt to kill Xiao-gu and Kaijie. However both of them managed to escape except that Chen-sao and Ah She trapped inside. Xiao-gu reentered the house to save Chen-sao but Ah She was burnt to death after being pinned down by fallen pillars.

==== New Neighbours, New Terrors ====
As Xiao-gu and Kaijie recover from that traumatic episode, a new neighbour moved into the flat that Xiao-gu rented. Little did Xiao-gu know that her new neighbors were the young man who delivered her the key to Ah Cheng's safe - Jinlong, and his father, Ah Jin - the man who saved Xiao-gu from certain death by "Snake". As the new family settled in, Ah Jin used the money he earned (from sailing, as Ah Jin claimed) to buy his children clothes, blankets, and a television set (considered a luxury to people of their social class during that time). Ah Jin shared his new television set with his neighbours, whose children were mesmerised by it.

Meanwhile, word of mouth began to spread on information about a rapist terrorizing Chinatown. The rapist, who covers himself in motor oil, renders his victims defenceless and unable to resist, thus earning him the title "Oily Man". Xiao-gu made light of the situation at first, thinking it was merely an urban legend, until she was attacked by the Oily Man. Luckily, Ah Jin was in the flat when it happened, and stopped the Oily Man from raping Xiao-gu. Jinlong, on his father's orders, went after the Oily Man. Jinlong subsequently discovered Oily Man was in fact Ah Lin, the timid co-owner (along with his gossipmonger wife, Ah Ying) of a wanton store next to Xiao-gu's restaurant. Jinlong went on to extort money from Ah Lin, with a threat of revealing the truth behind Oily Man to everyone. When Ah Lin failed to produce the money, Jinlong exerted more and more pressure, until Ah Lin lost his temper, and chased Jinlong, Jinfeng (Jinlong's sister), and Kaijie across Chinatown with a gun, threatening to kill them all. Afterwards, Ah Lin was arrested by Lao Cai, a police officer who lives and patrols in the area, and sent to a mental facility.

==== Revelations ====
As time goes by, Ah Jin and his family were settling well into their new surroundings, but Ah Jin's past began to unravel. Contrary to Ah Jin's claim that he is a sailor, Ah Jin was, in fact, a criminal who, along with two accomplices, robbed a jewelry store. One of the accomplice, despite Ah Jin's efforts to save him, was shot dead in the midst of the escape, and a third accomplice successfully fled the scene with Jin. Ah Jin, along with his surviving accomplice, buried their loot in an undisclosed location. Finally, Ah Jin's secret came out in subtle ways, which led to Kaijie knowing about this dark secret. In the meantime, Xiao-gu and Ah Jin began to grow closer together everyday, and decided to marry each other.

This came, of course, to the extreme displeasure of Kaijie, who did not fancy having a criminal stepfather. To stop the marriage, Kaijie collaborated with Ah Ying, and called the police on Ah Jin. As Ah Jin and Xiao-gu completed their marriage ceremony and exchanged their vows, police surrounded Xiao-gu's flat, and forced Ah Jin to escape. Before Ah Jin went on the run, he held Ah Cai as hostage, and entrusted Jinlong and Jinfeng to her care. When Ah Jin realised there was no chance for him to escape, he committed suicide.

=== 1995 ===
After Ah Jin's suicide, the area where Xiao-gu lived in was being redeveloped, and Xiao-gu, along with her family, moved to another area to start anew. Years went by, and by 1995, Xiao-gu's Happy Restaurant became a reputable restaurant in Queenstown. Her five children have matured into adults. All of Xiao-gu's three children: Kaida, Kaiqi, and Kaijie, went to University. Kaida majored in medicine, Kaiqi majored in Mass Communication, and Kaijie (despite his poor grades during his childhood) majored in law. Meanwhile, Ah Jin's children are a different story. Jinlong did not receive much education, and worked in Happy Restaurant as a delivery boy. Jinfeng worked as a receptionist at the Happy Restaurant, but her dreams of being a television artiste virtually locked her in front of a television set, rendering her unproductive.

==== Tensions within ====
All seems to be going well for Xiao-gu, but under the surface, tensions arise. Jinlong resents the entire Huang family because he believes Xiao-gu married Ah Jin for his loot and that Xiao-gu's family is responsible for his father's death. This became a source of argument between Jinlong and Kaijie, with whom he was never on cordial terms with. Meanwhile, Kaijie developed an affection for Jinfeng, but due to the source of tension between the two families, he dare not make his feelings public.

==== Love and conflict ====
One day, a woman came into the Happy Restaurant, and ordered everything there is on the menu. The woman turned out to be Lin Fei, whose father, Lin Desheng, is a famous and prestigious lawyer in Singapore. Lin Fei did not have money to pay the bill, but Xiao-gu laughed off the entire matter, and told Lin Fei to come back when she has the cash. She paid off the bill before she left Happy Restaurant, and began a deep friendship with Xiao-gu, and fell in love with Jinlong at first sight. Jinlong did not reciprocate the love at first, but gradually began to warm up to Lin Fei.

During a visit by Jinlong of his grandfather, Jinlong discovered that his grandfather hired a young woman from Kelantan to run his bak kut teh business at a local marketplace. Bak Kut Girl, as she is known, is brute and rude, but this is merely a facade for a kind and caring interior. These relationships began to ferment, until a fateful yacht trip. During that trip, Kaijie attempted to soothe a distraught Jinfeng, who was dealing with a relatively recent pregnancy furore caused by Kaijie. Under much pressure to keep the unfortunate event secret due to her fledgling rise to become a television artiste, Jinfeng was taken onto a yacht owned by Lin Fei to unwind and relax. During the yacht trip, Jinfeng discovered Kaijie's motive for dating Lin Fei: to gain access to her billion-dollar trust fund, which will be freed to her when she is married. Horrified, Jinfeng vowed to tell Lin Fei the truth, but in the ensuing scuffle with Kaijie, she accidentally got thrown overboard. No one on board the ship noticed until it was too late, and Jinfeng was in a Persistent Vegetative State when she was rescued by David and Kaiqi. This happened when Jinlong was in prison for assault, and Xiao-gu opted to not tell him until it was absolutely necessary.

==== Revelation, cover-up ====
When Jinlong was released from prison, Xiao-gu treated him to a big meal, before attempting to tell him the truth about Jinfeng. However, Jinfeng was dying at the hospital, and Jinlong was called to the hospital while he was out shopping with Bak Kut Mei. Jinfeng eventually died, along with her unborn child. Prior to the tragedy, Kaida discovered that Kaijie is responsible for Jinfeng's death. It turned out that Jinfeng was using a camcorder when she was thrown overboard, and Kaijie, after discovering the camera had a recording of the incident on its tape, hid it in a clothing drawer.

Kaida covered up for his brother at first (by destroying the tape), but quickly, the stress and guilt that came with the coverup began to overwhelm Kaida. When Jinlong came across facts that made Jinfeng's death suspicious, Jinlong proceeded to pressure Kaida into telling the truth, which contributed to Kaida's mental meltdown. Kaida's mental instability led to his suspension as a doctor. Jinlong was alienated from the Huang family because of their perception that he was responsible for Kaida's insanity, he descended into drugs, and entered the triads to get the necessary income for it.

=== 2003 ===
Years passed, and by 2003, all of Xiao-gu's children were in their thirties. Kaiqi became a television journalist, and Kaijie became a police officer. Meanwhile, Kaida, who is still mentally unstable, worked at the Happy Restaurant for Xiao-gu, watching television for the entire time he was there- just like what Jinfeng did when she worked for Xiao-gu

One evening, Kaiqi was late for the usual family dinner that Xiao-gu had with her children. It turned out that Kaiqi, while doing an investigation into the triads, discovered that Jinlong was working for the Triads as an illegal bookie/prostitute operator, and that the triad member that Kaiqi was shadowing was, in fact, Jinlong's fellow member. Jinlong met with Kaiqi later to persuade her to drop the report. Kaiqi refused, but she stated that she will blur out the triad member's face. This marked the first time that Jinlong had any contact with Xiao-gu's family since his departure from the family, and into the Triads. Although Jinlong was still cold to Xiao-gu and Kaijie, Jinlong's receptive attitude toward Kaiqi remained the same, proven from the fact that as Kaiqi planned her wedding with David, Jinlong bought her a necklace.

Meanwhile, Lin Fei, ever wanting to meet Jinlong once again, even though she is in a relationship with Kaijie, decided to go search for Jinlong, even to the point of becoming a prostitute (albeit temporarily) to seek out Jinlong, much to the chagrin and displeasure of Kaijie. Jinlong, on the surface, did not care for Lin Fei, but deep inside, he knew that Lin Fei cannot be dragged into his criminal lifestyle, and that he had to repel Lin Fei.

==== Triad murder ====
In the Triad Underworld, however, many things are coming to a head. Jinlong's rival in the underworld, Old Monkey, was fighting with Jinlong for supremacy, and this culminated in a rooftop confrontation that ended in the accidental death of Old Monkey. Old Monkey's followers decided to testify against Jinlong in court to put him behind prison for a long time. However, at the last minute, a prestigious lawyer named Su Ma came to Jinlong's defence. Because of Su Ma's prestige within the legal community, it was obvious that Lin Fei was the one who retained Su Ma for Jinlong. Jinlong was subsequently found not guilty.

==== Climax ====
Meanwhile, Kaida began to recover from his mental instability, and this meant that Kaida is about to tell the truth about Jinfeng's murder years ago. Kaijie, determined to not let the truth get out, attempted to compromise Kaida's mental state, so that the truth never comes out. However, when Kaida was involved in a car accident, he finally told Jinlong the truth. Devastated by the news, and determined to exact revenge, Jinlong took up an earlier offer by a Triad elder to become the head of the Triads, thus paving the way for a showdown between Jinlong and Kaijie. This showdown cost Jinlong sight in his right eye, and also the life of Bak Kut Girl (whom he had just married), who had always vowed to be alongside Jinlong at all times, even following him into the Triads. 6 months later, Jinlong found out that Kaijie had killed Bak Kut Girl in cold blood, and left her body to decompose in the woods. Lin Fei told Kaijie that she knew the truth behind Jinfeng's murder, and that Kaijie married her only for money. She contemplated suicide, only to learn that she was pregnant with Kaijie's child.

Jinlong confronted Kaijie (who had quit from the police force and become a lawyer) in an old warehouse, where Kaida and Kaiqi were also present. Under the persuasion of Kaida and Kaiqi, Jinlong decided not to kill Kaijie. Jinlong later collected Bak Kut Girl's ashes, scattered them over the ocean, and then committed suicide (ironically, in the same manner that Jinlong's father, Ah Jin, did when he was surrounded by police years ago). As for Kaijie, his criminal deeds were discovered by the police (through a handwritten note found on Bak Kut Girl's body linking him to her murder), thus forcing him to flee from the country.

==== 2006 ====
Three years later, Xiao-gu, mindful of the predicaments her children have ended up in, decided to sell all her businesses, donate the proceeds to charity, and restart Happy Restaurant at another place. Kaiqi now has a daughter, and Kaida returned to work at the hospital.

While all family members began their new phase of life, Kaijie, still fleeing from the law, called his mother for the last time, moments before he was killed by an assassin (disguised as a bellboy) at a hotel. Lin Fei was seen at the beach with a young boy, most probably the child she had with Kaijie, while she ended a phone call regarding a business transaction, hinting that she was the one who hired the assassin.

== Release ==
The Golden Path was released on CD/DVD in 2008.

== Reception ==
=== Viewership ===
This drama serial had recorded the highest viewership rating for Year 2007.

| Week | Date | Percentage of Population (%) |
|---|---|---|
| Week 1 | 11 December 2007 to 14 December 2007 | 17.4% |
| Week 2 | 17 December 2007 to 21 December 2007 | 17.6% |
| Week 3 | 24 December 2007 to 28 December 2007 | 18.0% |
| Week 4 | 31 December 2007 to 4 January 2008 | 18.6% |
| Week 5 | 7 January 2008 to 11 January 2008 | 19.1% |
| Week 6 | 14 January 2008 to 18 January 2008 | 20.9% |
| Last episode | 21 January 2008 | 25.0% |

== Accolades ==
| Year | Award | Category | Nominee | Result | Ref |
|---|---|---|---|---|---|
| 2009 | Star Awards | Best Actor | Tay Ping Hui | Nominated | |
| 2009 | Star Awards | Best Actress | Chen Liping | Nominated | |
| 2009 | Star Awards | Best Actress | Felicia Chin | Nominated | |
| 2009 | Star Awards | Best Supporting Actor | Chew Chor Meng | Won | |
| 2009 | Star Awards | Best Supporting Actress | Cai Peixuan 蔡佩璇 | Nominated | |
| 2009 | Star Awards | Best Drama Serial | —N/a | Nominated | |
| 2009 | Star Awards | Best Theme Song | 路 by Mi Lu Bing | Nominated | |
