= Your Hand In Mine =

Singaporean TV drama

- 想握你的手
- Created by: Rebecca Leow 洪汐
- Written by: Rebecca Leow 洪汐; Zhang Liangxing 张亮星; Goh Chwee Chwee 吴翠翠; Chen Disheng 陈迪笙
- Directed by: 谢益文 林坤辉 苏妙芳
- Starring: Huang Wenyong; Chen Liping; Yvonne Lim; Belinda Lee; Cai Peixuan
- Opening theme: Your Hand In Mine (想握你的手) by Milubing; Your Hand In Mine (想握你的手) by Cavin Soh
- Ending theme: 想握你的手 (A-acapella version) by Teresa Tseng 只要你微笑 by Milubing 逞强 by Teresa Tseng 反方向 by The Freshman
- Country of origin: Singapore
- Original language: Chinese
- No. of episodes: 180

Production
- Producer: He Faming 何法明
- Running time: approx. 45 minutes per episode

Original release
- Network: MediaCorp TV Channel 8
- Release: 9 November 2009 – 16 July 2010

Your Hand In Mine
- Traditional Chinese: 想握你的手
- Simplified Chinese: 想握你的手
Transcriptions
Standard Mandarin
- Hanyu Pinyin: Xiǎng Wò Nǐ De Shǒu

Your Hand In Mine (Chinese: 想握你的手) was a long-running TV drama produced by Singapore's free-to-air channel, MediaCorp TV Channel 8. With 180 episodes, it was the longest-running local drama produced by Mediacorp, until it was succeeded by 118. It aired on weekdays at 7:00 pm. The cast includes Huang Wenyong, Chen Liping, Yvonne Lim, Belinda Lee and Cai Peixuan.

Your Hand In Mine was the first Mediacorp production to be filmed entirely at outdoor locations, like Lentor and Tanjong Katong, and the second to be filmed in high definition after The Ultimatum.

== Plot ==
Penny-pinching Zheng Shan Guo (Huang Wen Yong) and his family of seven live in a five-room apartment. His spendthrift wife Yu Xiang (Chen Li Ping) persuades him to move into a bigger house, but they end up living next to a neurotic neighbour Wu You Li (Cavin Soh). You Li has a large tumour on his neck, making him self-conscious. He is often disagreeable, but the arrival of a blind girl causes him to soften his relations with others.

Lan Jin Yin (Jin Yinji) stays in the apartment next to Shan Guo with her two grandchildren, Li Qin (Shaun Chen) and Li Fen (Paige Chua); their mother Qiu Mei (Jue Xi) has been imprisoned for killing their father. On her release, Qiu Mei is shunned by Jin Yin and Li Qin but moves into an apartment near them to reconcile and make up for her past mistakes. The story touches on family issues, regrets, and love lost and found.

== Chit Chat Club ==
Before an episode, a humorous three-minute clip called Chit Chat Club (叽喳棺) was telecast as an appetiser for viewers.

== Cast and characters ==
- Huang Wenyong as Zheng Shanguo (郑山国) He runs and owns two coffee shops called "899", and is focused on business and profit. He is married to Zheng Yuxiang, who spends his money as soon as he makes it. Despite being henpecked, Shanguo shows his temper whenever Yuxiang spends his savings on a shopping spree. Shanguo hates gambling and avoids donating money because he does not trust charitable organisations. Despite his tough exterior, he has a soft heart and is willing to help others through actions rather than cash. He lives at Lentor Plain with his wife and three daughters, Aizhen, Aishan, and Aimei. He longs for a son, but his wife finds ways to avoid getting pregnant.
- Chen Liping as Zhang Yuxiang (张玉香) The female boss of 899 and the unofficial head of the Zheng family. She keeps an iron grip on her husband Shanguo and yearns to climb the social ladder and be a rich 'tai-tai', squandering money on branded bags and clothes. She hates her neighbour, the rag-and-bone man Wu Youli; they often threaten each other with lawsuits and trade insults over seemingly trivial matters. Yuxiang constantly worries about the love life of her three daughters, Aizhen, Aishan, and Aimei, and tries to find them rich and handsome boyfriends but always fails in her matchmaking.
- Yvonne Lim as Zheng Aizhen (郑爱真) The eldest daughter of Zheng Shanguo and Zheng Yuxiang. She is nicknamed "Tornado" (龙卷风) because she is impatient and impulsive. She job-hops because her personality makes her unpopular with her employers, but she has many admirers. Eventually, she gets a job as a television news reporter at Clear Sky channel.
- Belinda Lee as Zheng Aishan (郑爱善) The second daughter of Zheng Shanguo and Zheng Yuxiang. She is a cleanliness freak and a walking dictionary of germs and bacteria; she takes vitamins to 'protect herself from diseases. She works as an auditor and is disliked by many of her colleagues for her over-scrupulousness.
- Cai Peixuan as Zheng Aimei (郑爱美), The youngest daughter in the family. She has a low IQ and low self-esteem and is often teased for her slowness (慢三拍) and her habit of hiccupping when upset or under pressure. Despite this, she is a baking expert, often praised by her grandmother. She is very close to her father, who uses her to discover her mother's spending sprees. After meeting Yue Guang, a psychologist, she finds a job at his clinic to get closer to him, because he listens to her worries.
- Yao Wenlong as Zheng Shuiguo (郑水国) Shanguo's younger brother and Qiaomei's youngest son, Zheng is constantly getting into trouble. He gambles and womanises, worrying his mother. After setting up a sleazy massage parlour, he boasts about being a boss and belittles Qiumei, his tenant, making her pay him in cash for any favors. Despite constantly being bullied by Shuiguo, Shanguo knows his brother well and can see through his underhand behaviours.
- Hong Damu as Lu Qiaomei (卢巧妹) Shanguo and Shuiguo's mother. Jinyin's friend, a former neighbour of Li and Wu
- Chen Xijie as Zheng Weiren (鄭偉仁) Shanguo and Yuxiang's son. Li's neighbour
- Shaun Chen as Li Liqin (李立勤) Former CEO of JZ production company. He is Jinyin and Jianzhou's grandson, Lifen's brother, and Qiumei. He is married to Aizhen and their child is Xiaolong. In the later part of the series, he goes bad, abusing Aizhen and spying on her and her lover Fang Kai, and violence ensues. He kills Zen in Episode 154 and assaults and kidnaps other characters.
- Paige Chua as Li Lifen (李立芬) Jinyin and Jianzhou's granddaughter. Liqin's sister. Qiumei's daughter. Zheng's Family neighbour. Aizhen's love rival for Fang Kai. Roland's wife. Film director
- Jin Yinji as Lan Jinyin (蓝金银) Liqin and Lifen's grandmother. Jianzhou's wife. Qiumei's mother-in-law. Zheng's Family neighbour
- Jess Teong as Guan Qiumei (关秋梅) Liqin and Lifen's mother. Ex-convict. Dezhu's assistant. Shuiguo's wife. Li Jianzhou & Lan Jinyan's daughter-in-law
- Cavin Soh as Wu Youli (吴有礼) Youqing's brother Aishan's husband. Bai Shouye's & Jinlian's son. Wu Tianming's adopted son. Zheng Shanguo & Zhang Yuxiang's second Son In Law. Zheng's Family neighbour
- Joanne Peh is Wu Youqing (吴有情) Youli's sister. Yue Guang's Former Fiancee. Bai Shouye's & Jinlian's daughter. Wu Tianming's adopted daughter. Fang Kai's Girlfriend. Zheng's Family neighbour
- Joanne Peh is Liu Jinlian (刘金莲) Bai Shouye's former wife. Youqing and Youli's mother and a Trickster
- Zhang Yaodong as Yue Guang (岳光) Wu Youqing's former Fiance. Roland's uncle and a Counsellor. Jinlian's friend died from falling off a building after saving Aizhen
- Adam Chen is Roland Yue Guang's nephew. Lifen's husband. Zen's former boyfriend. H2O's guardian
- Pierre Png as Fang Kai (方楷) Jason and Janet's son and Felicia's brother. Aizhen's former boyfriend. Youqing's boyfriend. Xiaolong's godfather. Chairman of JZ Production Company
- Chen Shucheng as Jason Fang (Jason方) Fang Kai and Felicia's father. Janet's husband. Zen's former admirer
- He Jie as Janet Fang (Janet方) Jason's wife and Fang Kai's mother and Felicia's stepmother
- Sharon Wong as Felicia Fang (Felicia方) Jason and Janet's daughter.Liqin's former girlfriend. she was sent to Reab Centre and overseas by Janet and Jason
- Pan Lingling as Dolly Lin (林多利) Hanwen's wife. Yuxiang's friend. Zen's best friend. Minxing's agent. President of the Women's Club. Xiaodong, Xiaoxi and Xiaonan's mother. Dedao's former girlfriend
- Huang Shinan is Lin Hanwen (林汉文) Duoli's husband. Police officer. Xiaodong, Xiaonan, and Xiaoxi's father. Shuixian's former boyfriend
- Chen Xingyu as Lin Xiaonan (林小南) Duoli and Hanwen's son. Xiaoxi's brother. Ah Ru's friend. Child Actor
- Leron Heng as Lin Xiaoxi (林小西) Duoli and Hanwen's daughter. Xiaonan's sister. In the relationship with Gao Yongjun
- Joshua Ang as Gao Yongjun (高勇俊) Zen's stepson. Xiaoxi's friend. Shuixian's former student. Vice Chairman of JZ Production Company. Vice Chairman of Zen Production Company
- Lynn Poh as Zen Zhou (Zen周) H2O's stepmother. The Head of JZ Production Company and Head of Zen Production Company. Jason's business partner. Roland's former girlfriend and Duoli's friend
- Pamelyn Chee as Ah Bing (阿冰) Auntie OK's daughter. Aishan, Lifen and Youli's best friend. Aishan's rival in love for Wu Youli
- Celest Chong as Bai Shuixian (白水苋) H2O and Xiaoxi's former form teacher. Shouye's daughter. Hanwen's former girlfriend. Youli and Youqing's half-sister.
- Wang Yuqing as Zhao Dezhu (赵得柱) TCM practitioner. Dedao's brother and Qiumei's admirer
- Wang Yuqing as Zhao Dedao (赵得道) Gynaecologist. Dezhu's brother and Duoli's former boyfriend
- Zhang Wei as Bai Shouye (白守业) Bai Shuixian's father. Xiaoke and Shuiguo's boss. Leader of a triad. Youqing and Youli's biological father.
- Chen Huihui

== Original sound track ==
| Song title | Performer | Type of Song |
|---|---|---|
| 想握你的手 | 迷路兵 Milubing | Theme Song (Episodes 1–90) |
| 想握你的手 | 苏智城 Cavin Soh | Theme Song (Episodes 91–180) |
| 想握你的手 (a cappella version) | 曾咏霖 Teresa Tseng | Sub Theme Song |
| 只要你微笑 | 迷路兵 Milubing | Sub Theme Song |
| 逞强 | 曾咏霖 Teresa Tseng | Sub Theme Song |
| 反方向 | 插班生 | Sub Theme Song |

== Viewership ratings ==
The drama did not fare very well in the ratings. One of the reasons for this is that the popular Korean drama Cruel Temptation was running in the same slot time on Channel U. Viewers of Your Hand In Mine suggested that Cruel Temptation should be aired on the weekend to compete head-on with Taiwanese drama Love, instead of Glory of Family which was airing during weekends.

The initial part of the drama attracted an average of 680,000 viewers, the middle part 730,000 and more than 800,000 towards the end. At one time, the ratings plunged to as low as 400,000 viewers, making it Mediacorp's lowest rated long-running drama.

== Accolades ==
| Organisation | Year | Category | Nominee(s) | Results | Ref |
|---|---|---|---|---|---|
| Star Awards | 2010 | Best Programme Promo | Ng Wan Churn | Nominated | |
| Star Awards | 2011 | Best Director | Edmund Tse | Nominated | |
| Star Awards | 2011 | Best Actor | Shaun Chen | Nominated | |
| Star Awards | 2011 | Best Actress | Joanne Peh | Nominated | |
