= Huang Wenyong =

Singaporean actor and host

- 黃文永
- Born: 25 July 1952; Kuala Lumpur, Selangor, Federation of Malaya
- Died: 20 April 2013 (aged 60); Singapore General Hospital, Outram, Singapore
- Resting place: Kong Meng San Phor Kark See Monastery
- Citizenship: Singaporean (2008–2013)
- Occupations: Actor; host; teacher
- Years active: 1977–2013
- Spouse: Teh Kim Hua
- Children: 2

Chinese name
- Traditional Chinese: 黃文永
- Simplified Chinese: 黃文永
- Hanyu Pinyin: Huáng Wényǒng

Huang Wenyong (25 July 1952 – 20 April 2013) was a Malaysia-born Singaporean actor, host and teacher.

Huang died at the Singapore General Hospital at around 5 pm (GMT+8) on 20 April 2013, at the age of 60 due to lymphoma.

== Early life and career ==
Huang was a teacher in Kuala Lumpur before leaving for Singapore. Huang moved to Singapore in the 1970s, with only fifty dollars in hand. He joined the Singapore Broadcasting Corporation in 1981. He is perhaps best known for his appearances in The Awakening, in which he played love interest to Xiang Yun's character, and The Seletar Robbery in 1982. Huang is also known for starring alongside Chew Chor Meng in the long-running popular series Don't Worry, Be Happy (1996–2002) and its spin-off Lobang King as the stingy uncle Leon Ong Kim Lye to Chew's character Ah Bee. Huang was nominated for and named one of the Top 10 Most Popular Male Artistes every single year in the annual Star Awards since its introduction in 1994, until his death in 2013. In total, Huang starred in more than a hundred Chinese-language television programmes. In addition to acting, Huang sang pieces for a few television sitcoms and also released two albums. He was an ambassador for anti-ageing product company Zell-V. He was an actor for MediaCorp from the late 1970s until his death. Appearing in more than 100 television programmes, he was among the first few batches of locally trained actors to enter the local entertainment industry was and considered to be one of the "pioneers in local Chinese drama".

== Personal life ==
Huang gained Singapore citizenship in October 2008 after residing in the country for 27 years. Huang was married with two children: a son and a daughter. He was a "lifelong devotee" of Buddhism.

=== Health ===
There was public concern after Huang appeared visibly haggard during MediaCorp Channel 8's 30th Drama Anniversary Show in November 2012. He clarified that he had been suffering from stomach flu, said to have been contracted in September 2012. During which, he was estimated to have lost 6–7 kilograms in weight. Huang would also experience intervals of severe fever. In November 2012, Huang was diagnosed with lymphoma and had to go for chemotherapy. His condition was not disclosed to the general public until his death, because Huang "wanted to go through this by himself". His medical condition had been kept a secret; only very few knew what actually ailed him.

== Death ==
Huang died at the Singapore General Hospital at around 5 pm Singapore Time on 20 April 2013, aged 60. The cause of his death was lymphoma. Huang was previously subject to a death hoax earlier in the month, which claimed that he had been diagnosed with terminal cancer. Huang's death sparked an "outpouring of grief" from both colleagues and fans alike. Thirty seconds of silence were observed and a special tribute segment aired before the start of the 2013 Star Awards ceremony held the evening after his death.

=== Funeral ===
His funeral wake was held a day after his death on 21 April 2013 at the Teochew Funeral Parlour, lasting for five days. Xiang Yun and Chen Shucheng delivered eulogies, as did a few others. Funeral attendees were measured by the hundreds. (Note: One source gives the figure as over 800, another states it as 500, and a third source writes 1,000.) To allow their staff to attend the procession, Channel 8 temporarily postponed or rescheduled their production activities. He was cremated at the Bright Hill Crematorium and Columbarium in Sin Ming.

== Legacy ==
In recognition of his contributions to the television industry in Singapore, Huang was posthumously awarded the "Honorary TV Award" on 28 April 2013, at the 2013 Star Awards. To commemorate his death, a television special titled Remembering Huang Wenyong was aired on 29 April 2013, and reruns of his television appearances were available on television and online platforms.

In October 2014, the Madame Tussauds Singapore museum unveiled a wax figure of Huang.

== Filmography ==
=== Television series ===
Year	Title	Role	Notes	Ref
1981	Sunset (落日余晖)	—N/a		
1981	When Will I See You Again (又见黄花)	—N/a		
1981	Spring Is Always Green (悲欢年华)	Gu Zhonghan		
1982	Seletar Robbery	Xiao Chen		
1982	The Diamond Chase (圣淘沙之旅)	Tang Yongda		
1983	Army Series (新兵小传)	Guo Zhenghao		
1983	All That Glitters is Not Gold (捷径)	—N/a		
1983	CID '83 (狮城勇探)	ASP Huang Zhihui		
1984	Ah Tu (阿突)	—N/a		
1984	The Awakening	He Ahshui		
1984	In the Wilderness (荒原)	Fang Xiang		
1984	The Awakening II	Yang Bingwen		
1984	Pursuit (怒海萍踪)	Guang Xu		
1985	Son of Pulau Tekong	Wen Chaoqiang		
1985	Home is Where Love is (吾爱吾家)	Luo Wenhao		
1986	The Happy Trio (青春123)	Huang Shaowei		
1986	Samsui Women	Su Ahzhi		
1986	Under One Roof (家和万事兴)	Guo Yiji		
1986	The Bond (天涯同命鸟)	Zhou Guichu		
1987	Five Foot Way (五脚基)	Liu Qihua		
1987	Moving On (变迁)	Zhuang Rongfa		
1987	Strange Encounters (奇缘 之《钟馗捉鬼》)	Zhong Kui		
1988	Heiress (世纪情)	Zhou Yushu		
1988	Airforce	Kuang Guozhong		
1988	The Last Applause (舞榭歌台)	Jiang Tianran		
1988	Mystery (迷离夜之"戒")	Ding Minchang		
1988	My Fair Ladies (窈窕淑女)	Zhao Yongsheng		
1988	Strange Encounters II (缘II 之《钟馗再捉鬼》)	Zhong Kui		
1989	Magic of Dance (鼓舞青春)	—N/a		
1989	Return of the Prince (丝路迷城)	Hua Shijin		
1990	Friends Next Door (我爱芳邻)	Tang Dawen		
1990	Marry Me (最佳配偶)	Liu Rixin		
1991	The Working Class (上班一族)	—N/a		
1991	Guardian Angel (爸爸怕怕)	Tao Zuimu		
1992	Women of Substance (悲欢岁月)	Hou Guoliang		
1992	Memories of June (六月的童话)	Zhang Zhonghua		
1992	Crazy Chase (富贵也疯狂)	Zhao Yiben		
1992	Love is in the Air (爱在女儿乡)	Mai Dacheng		
1993	Heavenly Beings (再战封神榜)	Lü Dongbin		
1993	Angel of Vengeance (暴雨狂花)	Zhang Dafu		
1993	Happy Foes (欢喜冤家)	Zhang Tianshi		
1993	Ninjas in Town (伏魔奇兵)	Xiao Peng		
1993	Happy Reunion (年年有鱼)	Zhu Ruogang		
1994	Thunder Plot	Sir Ou		
1994	The Challenger (勇者无惧)	Dong Qilong		
1994	Fiery Lover (烈火情人)	Shi Zhongping		
1994	Silk of Love (情丝万缕)	Fan Liren		
1995	The Ranger (铁血雄心)	Army officer		
1995	Home at 168 (大牌168)	Zhuo Tieshu		
1995	Strange Encounters III (奇缘III 之《灶神》)	Emperor		
1995	Strange Encounters III (奇缘III 之《门神》)	Tang Taizong		
1995	The Last Rhythm (曲终魂断)	Chen Zhiyuan		
1995	The Golden Pillow (金枕头)	Chen Haowen		
1996	Ah Xue (阿雪)	Lin Shugen		
1996	Triumph Over The Green (爱拼球会赢)	Himself		
1996	Diary of a Teacher (老师日记)	Wu Chuangxin		
1996	3-in-1 Love (爱情三合一)	Wang Yong		
1996-2002	Don't Worry, Be Happy (敢敢做个开心人)	Ong Kim Lye		
1997	My Family, My Love (高家万岁)	Gao Zhian		
1997	Hope (人间有梦)	A-qin		
1997	A Place to Call Home (薯条汉堡青春豆)	Liu Weizhong		
1997	From the Medical Files (医生档案)	Chen Junlin		
1998	Men on Crossroads (四个好涩的男人)	Wang Zhiwei		
1998	Dreams - Little Santa (七个梦 之《圣诞小人》)	Wang De		
1998	Around People's Park (珍珠街坊)	Wang Xi		
1999	God of Fortune (财神爷)	Zhao Gongming		
1999	My Grandpa (公公,你的名字好难叫)	Fang Dapeng		
2000	The Tax Files (流金税月)	Lin Zhilun		
2000	The Legendary Swordsman	Lin Zhennan		
2001	Three Women and A Half	Zhang Yongxing		
2001	The Hotel	Mr Goh		
2001	The Reunion	Steven Choo		
2002	Health Matters (一切由慎开始 之《孕妇杀手》)	A-yuan		
2002	Fantasy (星梦情真)	Yang Xiong		
2002	Springs of Life	Su Hua		
2003	Lobang King	Ong Kim Lye		
2003	True Heroes	Wang Jiancheng		
2003	Holland V	Lin Jingcai		
2003	Always on My Mind (无炎的爱)	Liu Zhengyu		
2004	I Love My Home (我爱我家)	Xu Chuanjia		
2004	These Ties That Bind (家财万贯)	Xiong Weihong		
2004	My Mighty-in-Laws	Fang Chunqiu		
2005	Destiny	Shen Congye		
2005	A Promise for Tomorrow	Fang Zhen		
2006	Women of Times	Andrew Jia Zengmu		
2006	Measure of Man	Cai Lianwei		
2007	The Peak	Tie Tou		
2007	Happily Ever After	Yu Di		
2007	Honour and Passion	Bao Pengju		
2007	The Golden Path	Lin Desheng		
2008	Just in Singapore	Lin Bang (Francis)		
2008	Crime Busters x 2	Xia Mingda		
2008	Love Blossoms	Yu Dongcheng		
2008	Love Blossoms II	Yu Dongcheng		
2009	My A-Go-Go Princess (穿越阿哥哥)	Landlord		
2009	Your Hand in Mine	Zheng Shanguo		
2010	The Score	Luo Zhigang		
2011	A Tale of 2 Cities	Pan Jiaxiang		
2011	Devotion	Xu Zhongzheng		
2011	Love Thy Neighbour	Dai Guozhong		
2012	Rescue 995	Ke Dashan		
2012	Blk 88	Sim Beng Huat	Voice-over	
2012	Joys of Life	Han Jianren		
2013	It's a Wonderful Life	Li Yunshun		

=== Film ===
Year	Title	Role	Notes
2000	2000 AD		Cameo
2001	My Valentine (二月十四)		
2003	Homerun	Chew Kiat Kun's father	
2011	It's a Great, Great World	Peter	

=== Variety show ===
Year	Title	Notes
1995	Those Were The Days (旧情绵绵)	Host with Zeng Xiaoying and later Huang Yuling
1998	Bon Appetite (食指大动)	
2003	Be My Guest (客人来)	
2004	Durian Delights (你吃我吃它刺刺刺)	
2004	Star of All Trades (行行出艺人)	
2006-2009	Living Golden Age (黄金年华)	
2010	Shop & Save	
2012	30 Years of Drama - Theme Song Concert (戏剧情牵30 - 我们的主题曲 演唱会)	Huang Wenyong, Chen Shucheng and Xiang Yun were presented the night's prestigious "Television Guru" award.
2012	Silver Carnival Series 1 (银色嘉年华)	

== Awards and nominations ==
Organisation	Year	Category	Nominated work	Result	Ref
Star Awards	1995	Best Actor	Homes in 168	Nominated	
Star Awards	1997	Special Achievement Award	—N/a	Won	
Star Awards	1997	Top 10 Most Popular Male Artistes	—N/a	Nominated	
Star Awards	1998	Best Comedy Performer	Don't Worry Be Happy	Nominated	
Star Awards	1998	Top 10 Most Popular Male Artistes	—N/a	Nominated	
Star Awards	1999	Best Comedy Performer	Don't Worry Be Happy	Nominated	
Star Awards	1999	Top 10 Most Popular Male Artistes	—N/a	Nominated	
Star Awards	2000	Best Comedy Performer	Don't Worry Be Happy	Won	
Star Awards	2000	Top 10 Most Popular Male Artistes	—N/a	Nominated	
Star Awards	2001	Best Actor	Three Women and A Half (as Zhang Yongxing)	Nominated	
Star Awards	2001	Best Comedy Performer	Don't Worry Be Happy	Nominated	
Star Awards	2001	Top 10 Most Popular Male Artistes	—N/a	Nominated	
Star Awards	2002	Best Comedy Performer	Don't Worry Be Happy	Nominated	
Star Awards	2002	Top 10 Most Popular Male Artistes	—N/a	Nominated	
Star Awards	2003	Best Supporting Actor	Holland V (as Lin Jingcai)	Nominated	
Star Awards	2003	Top 10 Most Popular Male Artistes	—N/a	Nominated	
Star Awards	2004	Top 10 Most Popular Male Artistes	—N/a	Nominated	
Star Awards	2005	Best Actor	Destiny (as Shen Congye)	Nominated	
Star Awards	2005	Top 10 Most Popular Male Artistes	—N/a	Nominated	
Star Awards	2006	Top 10 Most Popular Male Artistes	—N/a	Nominated	
Star Awards	2007	Evergreen Veteran	—N/a	Won	
Star Awards	2007	1980s Era Screen Heartthrob	—N/a	Won	
Star Awards	2007	Top 10 Most Popular Male Artistes	—N/a	Nominated	
Star Awards	2009	Best Actor	Just in Singapore (as Lin Bang Francis)	Nominated	
Star Awards	2009	Top 10 Most Popular Male Artistes	—N/a	Nominated	
Star Awards	2010	Top 10 Most Popular Male Artistes	—N/a	Nominated	
Star Awards	2011	Top 10 Most Popular Male Artistes	—N/a	Won	
Star Awards	2012	Top 10 Most Popular Male Artistes	—N/a	Nominated	
Star Awards	2013	Honorary TV Award (Posthumous)	—N/a	Won	
Star Awards	2013	Best Supporting Actor	Joys of Life (as Han Jianren)	Nominated	
Star Awards	2013	Top 10 Most Popular Male Artistes	—N/a	Won	
