= Seletar Robbery =

- Title Card
- 实里达大劫案
- Genre: Action
- Starring: Huang Wenyong; Chen Tiansong; Qian Zhigang; Chen Meng; Lim Seng Min(Staff sergeant)
- Country of origin: Singapore
- Original language: Mandarin

Production
- Running time: 90 Minutes

Original release
- Network: SBC 8th Frequency (Now MediaCorp Channel 8)
- Release: 25 July 1982; 2000 hours

Seletar Robbery (Simplified Chinese: 实里达大劫案, literally "The Great Seletar Robbery") is a 90-minute Singaporean action drama produced by Singapore Broadcasting Corporation (now MediaCorp) in 1982.

== Production ==
SBC began filming the drama on 31 May 1982, and filming lasted 24 days.

== Plot ==
Three thugs, Zhao, Soon and Chai, wearing masks, rob an employee of the workers' payroll belonging to a HDB construction company of S$300000 which was just withdrawn from the bank. The construction company was located at Seletar Reservoir, hence the drama's name. After robbing the construction company with guns, the three thugs were chased by workers there to their car which they used to escape. The police is alerted by an electrician who had witnessed the robbery. The robbers are about to escape when the police arrive.

== Cast ==
- Lim Seng Min as Inspector Kao
- Huang Wenyong as Chen
- Chin Chi Kang as Chai
- Richard Wong as Zhao
- Tan Tian Song as Soon
- David Kwok as an insane man

== Significance ==
Although it has only one episode, and there were earlier Chinese Language productions, Seletar Robbery is considered by MediaCorp to be the first locally produced Chinese Language television drama in colour production series, and Its first airing date – 25 July 1982 at 8 pm – is considered by SBC and its modern incarnation MediaCorp TV as the birth of local Mandarin Chinese drama production.

In 2007, MediaCorp marked its 25 years of Chinese television drama production by producing The Golden Path, which had a storyline commencing in 1982, the same year the Seletar Robbery was first aired. It showed clips of this series being watched by the characters of The Golden Path on television, along with some scenes borrowed from the original series.

The drama was re-run on MediaCorp Channel 8 on 11 December 2014 at 3:00am.
