= Wang Yuqing =

Singaporean actor (born 1961)

- Born: Tan Chooi Leong; 9 September 1961 (age 64); Singapore
- Education: Willow Avenue Secondary School
- Occupations: Actor; host; insurance agent
- Years active: 1983−present
- Spouses: Chen Bifeng (m. 1987; div. 1990); Tracer Wong (m. 1991; div. 1993); Liang Liling (m. 2001; div. 2011)

Chinese name
- Traditional Chinese: 王昱清
- Simplified Chinese: 王昱清
- Hanyu Pinyin: Wáng Yùqīng

Wang Yuqing (born Tan Chooi Leong on 9 September 1961) is a Singaporean actor.

== Education ==
Wang studied at Willow Avenue Secondary School.

== Career ==
Prior to his acting career, Wang served out his NS days in the Aerodrome fire service. He was offered a contract by the Singapore Broadcasting Corporation ( after completing the 3rd drama training course in 1982.

Wang first acted in SBC's Army series before starring in SBC's earliest idol drama, The Flying Fish, in 1983, which catapulted him to stardom.

In 1988, Wang almost joined Hong Kong's TVB but decided against it, citing his poor grasp of Cantonese and reluctance to leave a stable environment.

Initially, he had left the industry in 1995 to concentrate on his second job as an insurance agent but returned to MediaCorp in 2000 as a freelancer at the persuasion of some friends. Wang had become known for playing darker characters and antagonists such as in The Golden Path, Unriddle 2 and Joys of Life.

In 2020, Wang was cast as a taxi driver who drove in the day and as a spirit medium at night in HBO Asia’s Invisible Stories.

In 2022, Wang returned to Mediacorp and signed a two year contract with it.

=== Business venture ===
Wang used to run a Cantonese restaurant with fellow actor Chen Shucheng. The restaurant closed after the lease was over.

In 2022, Wang opened a bistro, Golf Spot Cafe & Bistro, at Mandai Executive Golf Course in Upper Seletar with his girlfriend and three friends. In 2025, Wang opened a second bistro, Eat Here, Drink Here Cafe & Bistro, at Punggol Golf Driving Range in Punggol East after he was invited to open a second bistro by an owner of the Mandai golf course where he opened his first bistro.

== Personal life ==
Wang is a full-time insurance agent with Manulife Singapore.

Wang was married to fellow actress Chen Bifeng from 1987 to 1990 and then also fellow actress Tracer Wong from 1991 to 1993. He then married Liang Liling from 2001 to 2011 whom he shares two sons and a stepson, actor Xavier Ong.

== Filmography ==
2006

- Love at 0°C as She Jing Yuan 佘敬远
- The Shining Star
- Family Matters

2005

- Love Concerige 爱的掌门人 as Peter
- Portrait of Home II
- Beyond The aXis of Truth II 法医X档案2 之《复生人》 as Prof Roland 罗伦院长

2004

- Double Happiness

2002

- Cash is King

2001

- The Stratagem 世纪攻略

1996

- Beyond Dawn 女子监狱 as Dr. Wei 卫医生

1995

- Sparks of Life 生命火花 as Jiang Yu De 江裕德

1994

- The Magnate 叱咤风云 as Zhang Tian Wu 张天武
- Dark Obsession 疯蝶 (Telemovie) as Michael 麦克

1993

- Endless Love 未了缘 as Zhou Yi Hong 周亦宏
- Sister Dearest 傻妹俏娇娃 as Lin Zhen Hua 林震华
- The Wilful Siblings 斗气姐妹 as Zhou Da Wei 周大卫

1992

- Duel La Shanghai 轰天龙虎 as Yan Wen Hao 严文浩
- Lady Steel 激情女大亨 as Weng Jia Wei 翁家卫

1991

- Fatal Endearment 谍海危情 as Li Guo Qiang 李国强
- Home Sweet Home 宜家宜乐
- The Other Woman 醋劲100 as Guo Ming Wei 郭明威

1990

- By My Side 逆风天使 as Luo Yun Feng 骆云峰
- Enchanted Eyes 天眼 as Tuo Shan & Chen Cang Long 脱善/陈苍龙

1989

- Two Different Lives 金兰结 as Lin Zhen Bang 林振邦
- The Sword Rules 剑断江湖 as Long Cheng Feng 龙乘风
- A Mother's Love 亲心唤我心 as Lin Xiao Liang 林孝良

1988

- Star Maiden 飞越银河 as Wen Jia Yu 文家宇
- Airforce as Liu Shao Hui 刘绍辉
- Mystery 1-Butterfly 迷离夜 之《蝶》as Shao Xue Liang 邵学良
- Strange Encounters 2 奇缘2 之《胭脂魂》、《心锁》 as Meng Jian Fei & Shang Guan Long 孟剑飞、上官龙

1987

- Five Foot Away 五脚基 as Xue Tian Xi 薛添喜
- Fury of the Dragon 冷月剑无言 as Feng San 凤三
- Strange Encounters 奇缘 之《银河星》 as Zhao Ying 赵颖

Year	Title	Role	Notes	Ref
1983	The Army Series 新兵小传	Chen Guo Qiang 陈国强		
1983	The Flying Fish	Wang Shu Qi 王书琪		
1983	Singapore Idol 1983			
1984	The Awakening	He Guo Rui 何国瑞		
1984	Growing Up 吾家有子			
1985	The Coffee Shop 咖啡乌			
1985	The Young Heroes 少年英雄	Du Ming Xuan 杜明轩		
1985	The Tycoon 豪门内外	Chen Ming Lun 陈铭伦		
2007	The Peak	Cai Kang 蔡康		
2007	Making Miracles			
2007	Metamorphosis	Zhao Baoqiang		
2007	Man of the House	Li Hongru		
2007	Live Again	Zhou Jian Nan 周建南		
2007	The Golden Path			
2007	Kinship 2	Ah Lin (阿林)		
2008	Taste of Love	Gary		
2008	Love Blossoms	Wang Zhong Hui (Anthony)		
2008	Love Blossoms II	Wang Zhong Hui (Anthony)		
2009	Reunion Dinner	Liang Tianhua 梁天华		
2009	My Kampong Days	Uncle Zhi		
2009	Together	Yao Shi		
2010	Your Hand In Mine	Zhao Dedao		
2010	No Limits	You Shan		
2010	Unriddle	Xu Zhirong		
2011	Kampong Ties	Cai Tianshi		
2011	A Song to Remember	Chen Ji		
2012	Unriddle 2	Ou Yongtai		
2012	Joys of Life	Gui Liqiang		
2012	Don't Stop Believin'	Cai Weifeng		
2012	It Takes Two	Fang Weijie		
2013	It's A Wonderful Life	Dimwit		
2013	96°C Cafe	Liu Haoren		
2013	The Dream Makers	Qin Wenxu		
2014	The Recruit Diaries (阿兵新传)	Chen Guoqiang		
2014	Scrum! (冲锋！)	Huang Guonan		
2014	C.L.I.F. 3	Zhang Zhiming		
2014	World at Your Feet	Huang Furen		
2014	Against the Tide	Qiu Gangzheng	Cameo	
2014	Three Wishes	Guo Shiming		
2015	118	Duan Ahzhi		
2015	Super Senior	Wang Dali		
2015	Sealed with a Kiss	Herman Wong		
2015	The Dream Makers II	Qin Wenxu		
2016	The Truth Seekers	Zheng Caishun		
2016	The Gentlemen	Wang Shengyi		
2016	Hero	Leo	Cameo	
2017	Eat Already? 2	Jimmy		
2017	Mightiest Mother-in-Law	Brother Ji		
2017	My Teacher Is A Thug	Lei Zheng		
2017	My Friends From Afar	Yang Zhongyong		
2018	A Million Dollar Dream	Wang Qiansui		
2018	Reach For The Skies	Huang Tianci	Cameo	
2018	You Can Be An Angel 3 (你也可以是天使3)	Xia Mingzhong 夏明忠		
2018	Till We Meet Again (千年来说对不起)	Bao Chenggong		
2018	Till We Meet Again (千年来说对不起)	Tang Sanzang		
2019	Playground (游乐场)	Chen Liansheng		
2019	Hello From The Other Side (阴错阳差)	Fang Youde		
2019	Pei Pei (佩佩)	Uncle Zheng		
2019	The Driver (司机)	Uncle Biao		
2019	C.L.I.F. 5	Lu Guotai		
2020	Invisible Stories			
2021	Key Witness (关键证人)	Luo Liqun		
2022	Home Again (多年后的全家福)	Jack Lim		
2022	Genie in a Cup (哇到宝)	She Yaoqiang		
2022	Truths About Us (别来无恙)	Fan Jinlong		
2022	Sunny Side up	Towkay Heng		
2023	The Sky is Still Blue	Henry		
2023	The Landlady Singer	Uncle Jian		

Films

Year	Title	Role	Notes	Ref
2018	The Drum		Short film	

== Awards and nominations ==
Year	Ceremony	Category	Nominated work	Result
2021	Star Awards	Best Evergreen Artiste	—N/a	Nominated
2022	Star Awards	Best Evergreen Artiste	—N/a	Nominated
2023	Star Awards	Top 10 Most Popular Male Artistes	—N/a	Nominated
