= Lobang King =

- 我是Lobang King
- Genre: Sitcom
- Starring: Chew Chor Meng; Huang Wenyong; Irene Ang; Jeff Wang; Joey Ng; Zen Chong
- Opening theme: 有福同享 by Wen Jinhua, sung by the cast
- Country of origin: Singapore
- Original language: Chinese
- No. of episodes: 22

Production
- Running time: approx. 30 minutes per episode

Original release
- Network: MediaCorp Channel 8
- Release: April 2003

Related
- Don't Worry, Be Happy (2002)

Lobang King (我是Lobang King) is a Singaporean sitcom which aired on Channel 8 in 2003. It is a spin-off of the popular long-running series Don't Worry, Be Happy (敢敢做个开心人), which had just ended its sixth and final season.

Chew Chor Meng, Huang Wenyong and Tracer Wong remain from the original series. Irene Ang of "Phua Chu Kang" fame and former Star Search finalists Jeff Wang, Joey Ng and Zen Chong joined the cast.

== Plot ==
Chew Chor Meng and Huang Wenyong return as the "kiasu" Ah Bee and his penny-pinching uncle Kim Lye respectively.

Ah Bee has set up a real estate company with Taiwanese partner Xu Jiefu. By chance, Jiefu employs Mabel as her English proficiency is crucial when dealing with foreign clients. However, Ah Bee and the recently divorced Mabel are often at loggerheads with each other. Mabel turns out to be Ming Zhu's English teacher in the past

Ah Bee's uncle Kim Lye is boss of a provisions shop. Kim Lye's employee "Mee Siam" is very pretty and often attracts customers, especially Jiefu who tries to woo her. Later, Kim Lye employs his old friend's son Daji and makes him work long hours without overtime pay to save money.

== Cast ==
- Chew Chor Meng as Jacky Chang (Ah Bee) 张英才
- Huang Wenyong as Ong Kim Lye Leon 黄金来. He also portrayed as Ong's mother.
- Jeff Wang as Xu Jiefu 许杰夫
- Irene Ang as Mabel
- Zen Chong as Hong Daji 洪大吉
- Melody Chen as Guo Ming Zhu (Zhu Zhu) 郭明珠 (珠珠)
- Joey Ng as Chua Mee Siam 蔡敏香
- Tracer Wong as Chen Jia Zhen 陈家珍
- Deng Mao Jie 邓茂杰 as Zhang Liu Bang 张刘邦

=== Guest appearance ===
- Terence Cao as William

== Reception ==
Wendy Teo of The New Paper wrote that the series' jokes are "tired and bland".
