= My First School =

Singaporean TV series

- 快乐第一班
- Genre: Family; School
- Created by: Cynthia Chong
- Written by: Cheong Yan Peng
- Directed by: Lim Mee Nah
- Starring: Julie Tan; Chen Liping; Youyi; Xiang Yun; Aloysius Pang; Chew Chor Meng; Zhang Yaodong
- Opening theme: 每个孩子都是天使 by Julie Tan
- Country of origin: Singapore
- Original language: Mandarin
- No. of episodes: 8

Production
- Producer: Winnie Wong
- Production location: Singapore
- Running time: approx. 23 minutes
- Production company: Mediacorp Studios

Original release
- Network: Mediacorp Channel 8
- Release: 12 April – 31 May 2016

My First School
- Traditional Chinese: 快樂第一班
- Simplified Chinese: 快乐第一班
Transcriptions
Standard Mandarin
- Hanyu Pinyin: kuái lé dī yī bán

My First School (Chinese: 快乐第一班) is a Singaporean Chinese drama series which is telecast on Singapore's free-to-air channel, Mediacorp Channel 8. The series began production in November 2015 and made its debut on 12 April 2016 and ended on 31 May 2016. This sitcom consists of 8 episodes, it stars Julie Tan, Chen Liping, Youyi, Xiang Yun, Chew Chor Meng, Aloysius Pang and Zhang Yaodong as the casts of this series.

The series is jointly presented by NTUC First Campus and the Lien Foundation.

== Cast ==
- Julie Tan as Xu Leqing
- Xiang Yun as Lin Yixin
- Damien Teo as Xu Lejie
- Chen Liping as Chen Xiujuan
- Youyi as Guo Jingwen
- Yap Huixin as Teacher Vegetable
- Bukoh Mary as Lin Yihan
- Aloysius Pang as Li Yonghui
- Zhang Yaodong as Weng Zhihao
- Chew Chor Meng as Xu Zhengbo
- Cruz Tay as Wang Likang

== Production ==
This drama series takes its name from My First Skool, a preschool chain owned by NTUC (which sponsors this show) as one of its social enterprises.

== Accolades ==
Year	Award	Category	Nominee	Result
2017	Star Awards	Young Talent Award	Cruz Tay	Nominated

== See also ==
- List of programmes broadcast by Mediacorp Channel 8
- List of My First School Episodes
