= Star Awards for Honorary TV Award =

Singaporean television award (2013)

Star Awards for Honorary TV Award 电视荣耀奖
- Current: Star Awards 2013
- Awarded for: Significant contributions made to the local TV industry
- Country: Singapore
- Presented by: MediaCorp
- First award: 2013
- Final award: 2013
- Currently held by: Huang Wenyong (2013)

The Star Awards for Honorary TV Award is an award presented at the Star Awards, a ceremony that was established in 1994.

The category was introduced in 2013, at the 19th Star Awards ceremony. It is a special achievement award given posthumously in honour of past MediaCorp artiste(s) who have contributed significantly to the local TV industry.

Huang Wenyong is the inaugural winner in this category. The award was not presented in 2019, although an artiste (Aloysius Pang) died earlier that year.

== Recipient ==
| Year | Artiste |
|---|---|
| 2013 | Huang Wenyong 黄文永 |

^{^[I]} Each year is linked to the article about the Star Awards held that year.
