= It's a Wonderful Life (TV series) =

- 好运到
- Genre: Family; Dramedy; Chinese New Year
- Written by: Lau Ching Poon 刘清盆; Cynthia Chong 张媚纭
- Directed by: Loo Yin Kam 卢燕金; Lin Mingzhe 林明哲 张慧盈 郭蕻仁 林美娜
- Starring: Ha Yu; Lin Meijiao; Chen Liping; Huang Wenyong; Elvin Ng; Julie Tan; Paige Chua
- Opening theme: 有时候 by Cavin Soh
- Ending theme: 爱不胜防 by Cavin Soh and Ruth Kueo 好运到 by Cavin Soh
- Country of origin: Singapore
- Original language: Chinese
- No. of episodes: 20

Production
- Producer: Winnie Wong 王尤红
- Running time: approx. 45 minutes

Original release
- Network: MediaCorp Channel 8
- Release: 21 January – 15 February 2013

Related
- Beyond; C.L.I.F. 2

It's a Wonderful Life
- Traditional Chinese: 好運到
- Simplified Chinese: 好运到
Transcriptions
Standard Mandarin
- Hanyu Pinyin: Hǎo Yùn Dào

It's a Wonderful Life (Chinese: 好运到) is a Singaporean Chinese New Year 2013 drama. It was telecast on Singapore's free-to-air channel, MediaCorp Channel 8. It stars Ha Yu, Lin Meijiao, Chen Liping, Huang Wenyong, Elvin Ng, Julie Tan and Paige Chua as the cast of the series. It made its debut on 21 January 2013 and consists of 20 episodes and was screened every weekday night at 9:00 pm. It was also Huang Wenyong's final drama.

== Overview ==
The plot revolves around Li and Hao families and several couples and deals with family and getting along with in-laws.

== Cast ==
Cast	Role	Description
Ha Yu; Xu Bin (younger)	Hao Huixian 郝辉先	An ex-gambler
Ha Yu; Aloysius Pang (younger)	Hao Huihuang 郝辉煌	Late twin brother of Huixian, moved to Canada.
Lin Meijiao	Amy; Chen Daizhu 陈黛珠	Hao Huixian's wife Suffered memory loss after Dimwit accidentally hit her head in ep 3
Elvin Ng	Gu Zhiji 顾志己 "Stone" 石头	A down and out artist. Huixian's stepson, Amy's son married Ping'an in episode 20
Julie Tan	Hao Ping'an 郝平安	Married Zhiji in episode 20; Huihuang's daughter, grows up in Canada; Returns to Singapore.
Dennis Chew	Bai Baoxiang (Carl Bei) 白宝乡	A property agent. Resembles Nana's late husband. Xiaorou's wife
Adeline Lim	Wen Xiaorou 温小柔	Baoxiang's wife. Works in Jewellery shop
Zen Chong	Li Siyuan 李思源	Tuition teacher Isabella's husband Li Yunshun's only son
Paige Chua	Isabella "1386"	Siyuan's wife
Huang Wenyong	Li Yunshun 李运顺	Fan Wenxiang's husband
Chen Liping	Fan Wenxiang 范文香	Li Yunshun's wife
Ivan Lo	Li Tinghuan 李庭欢 "Huanhuan 欢欢"	Siyuan and Isabella's only son
Zhou Ying	Zhong Jingyi 钟静宜	Works in a laundry industrial site. Xiao Qi's girlfriend
Desmond Tan	Hao Fuqi 郝福齐 "Xiao Qi 小齐"	Huixian's son A Celebrity
Brandon Wong	Ma Lin Shu 马林竖 "Potato 马铃薯"	Xixi's husband
Sora Ma	Zhang Xixi 张细细	Potato's wife
Wang Yuqing	Dimwit 傻佬	A rag-and-bone man.
Pamelyn Chee	Nana 娜娜	A client of Baoxiang.
Wallace Ang	Ken	Nana's assistant who wants to blackmail Nana.

== Production ==
Filming started on 23 Jul 2012 and is expected to end on 31 Oct 2012 possibly due to Beyond's early filming. Out-of-studio filming locations included Ang Mo Kio, Tiong Bahru, Commonwealth, Haw Par Villa, East Coast and Marina.

Trailers first screened on 9 Jan 2013.

The drama used a new credits roll, which will change in the next few dramas. Bloopers (without audio) are shown during the ending credits of each episode.

Initially, a sequel of Love Thy Neighbour was to be filmed and aired as the Chinese special but was scrapped as Chin would not be available due to her studies. This series, however, still featured a number of artistes who appeared on Love Thy Neighbour, including Ha Yu, Brandon Wong, Huang Wenyong, and Lin Meijiao, among others.

== Release ==
=== Broadcast ===
It's a Wonderful Life aired in conjunction with Chinese New Year 2013. It was the first drama to be broadcast exclusively in Malaysia after its first telecast of two weeks, it debuted on Astro Shuang Xing on 6 February and ended its run on 5 March 2013.

=== Talkshow ===
A talkshow, It's More Than A Wonderful Life, talking about Singapore's everyday lives was released. It is hosted by Guo Liang and Quan Yi Fong with appearances from the cast of the drama (Chen Liping, Paige Chua, Zen Chong, Dennis Chew and Brandon Wong).

== Reception ==
The series is one of three drama serials to tie-in for 3rd-highest-rated drama serial in 2013 (the other two are Break Free and The Journey: A Voyage), with an average viewership of 835,000, breaking the record set by Beyond (with 834,000). Despite this, it has only two nominations for Star Awards 20.

== See also ==
- List of programmes broadcast by Mediacorp Channel 8
- Aloysius Pang
- Huang Wen Yong
