= The Flying Fish =

- Title card
- 小飞鱼
- Genre: Swimming
- Starring: Wang Xiang Qin; Ang Teck Bee; Maggie Teng; Wang Yuqing
- Country of origin: Singapore
- No. of episodes: 8

Production
- Producer: Poon Mun Kit
- Running time: 60 Minutes

Original release
- Network: SBC 8th Frequency
- Release: 1983

The Flying Fish (Chinese: 小飞鱼; lit. 'Little Flying Fish') is an 8-episode Singaporean television drama series produced by Singapore Broadcasting Corporation in 1983. It revolves around the travails of an aspiring teenage swimmer and is considered one of the first locally produced "idol dramas".

== Cast ==
- Wang Yuqing as Wang Shuqi. A 17-year-old whose interest lies not in studying and preparing for University, but in swimming. This passion comes much to the chagrin of his father, who strongly believes that if Shuqi does not enter a university, it would bring immense shame to him and the family.
- Chen Bifeng as Wang's sister.
- Chen Weifen
- Huang Xiang Qing
- Ang Peng Bee as Chen Shuyu
- Maggie Teng as Chen Baoer
- Zeng Huifen as Ah Fen

== Episodes ==
No.	Title	Original release date
1	"Episode One"	August 12, 1983
2	"Episode Two"	August 19, 1983
3	"Episode Three"	August 26, 1983
4	"Episode Four"	September 2, 1983
5	"Episode Five"	September 9, 1983
6	"Episode Six"	September 16, 1983
7	"Episode Seven"	September 23, 1983
8	"Episode Eight (Finale)"	September 30, 1983

== Reception ==
A survey by Frank Small and Associates Marketing and Research Consultants estimated over 600,000 watched the series.

== See also ==
- The Champion, a 2004 MediaCorp TV series that revolved around two professional swimming teams.
- No Limits, a 2010 Mediacorp TV series that revolved around two swimming sisters who were born by the same mother and different fathers.
