= Thunder Plot =

- 惊天大阴谋
- Genre: Action
- Starring: Huang Wenyong; Eddie Kwan
- Country of origin: Singapore
- Original language: Mandarin

Production
- Running time: approx. 45 minutes

Original release
- Network: SBC 8th Frequency
- Release: 1994

Thunder Plot (Chinese: 惊天大阴谋) is a Singaporean action drama produced by Singapore Broadcasting Corporation (SBC) (now MediaCorp) in 1994.

== Cast ==
- Huang Wenyong
- Eddie Kwan
- Zoe Tay
