= Chew Chor Meng =

Singaporean actor and businessman (born 1968)

- Born: Chew Chor Meng; 20 November 1968 (age 57); Singapore
- Education: Pei Chun Public School; Holy Innocents' High School
- Alma mater: Ngee Ann Polytechnic
- Occupations: Actor; host; businessman
- Years active: 1990–present
- Spouse: Deon Chew (m. 2000)
- Children: 2
- Awards: Full list

Chinese name
- Traditional Chinese: 周初明
- Simplified Chinese: 周初明
- Hanyu Pinyin: Zhōu Chūmíng
- Pha̍k-fa-sṳ: Chiû Tshô-mìn
- Jyutping: Zau1 Co1 Ming4
- Hokkien POJ: Chiu Chho͘-bêng
- Tâi-lô: Tsiu Tshoo-bîng
- Teochew Peng'im: ziu1 co1 mêng5

Chew Chor Meng (born 20 November 1968) is a Singaporean actor, television host and businessman. He is one of the first batch of actors to receive the Star Awards for All-Time Favourite Artiste in 2004.

== Career ==
Chew started his career in showbiz after winning Star Search in 1990, a bi-annual nationwide talent search. Since then, he has never failed to make it to the Top 10 Most Popular Male Artistes in the Star Awards, an award ceremony for TV personalities, since its inception in 1994. In 2004, Chew was awarded the All-Time Favourite Artiste with Li Nanxing and Zoe Tay.

He first earned his acting nomination for his role as Hong San in the 1995 epic The Teochew Family, which he's still known to audiences in China. This was also evident when he bagged the Best Actor Award in Star Awards 2000 in Hainan Kopi Tales. His popularity has also spread across the causeway as he was voted the Most Popular MediaCorp Male Artiste in Malaysia. He made his first crossover to English sitcom in Mr. Kiasu. During the late 1990s to early 2000s, he was best known for his role as Jacky Chang aka Ah Bee, a salesman with a penchant for grabbing 'lobangs' (good opportunities that cannot be missed) in the popular Channel 8 sitcom Don't Worry, Be Happy, which spanned for six seasons. Chew initially dropped out from the role of Ah Bee after the 3rd season due to fear of being typecast, and also because he wanted to focus more on drama and variety shows. He eventually reprised the role for the latter half of the 6th (and final) season for Don't Worry Be Happy, and appeared in a spinoff series Lobang King focusing on Ah Bee and his new league of friends.

Chew is known for his versatility and ability to portray different characters that leave a lasting impression. At the 25th anniversary special in 2007, his character Ah Bee was named as one of the most memorable TV roles and his role as the villain Li Kechun in The Reunion was voted the Top 10 most memorable villains. In 2009 he won the Best Supporting Actor award, despite the nominations being dominated by cast of the popular blockbuster series The Little Nyonya, for his portrayal of a promising young doctor driven to vice and insanity by unfortunate circumstances in The Golden Path.

Now a well-known household name, Chew has gone from acting in drama series to hosting shows and large-scale events including overseas collaborations with Taiwan and China. He was nominated for the Best Info-Ed Host Award at the Star Awards 2010 for co-hosting Food Hometown.

Chew's contract with MediaCorp was set to expire in October 2010. Due to his illness, Chew initially did not expect his contract to be renewed. However, reports surfaced in November 2010 that Chew's contract was renewed for a further two years, with particular emphasis on hosting and new artiste training duties. He made his acting comeback with Channel U's Show Hand, followed by Channel 8 30th anniversary drama special Joys of Life.

Before the contract extension, Chew was planning to enter the restaurant business, which would have been Chew's second foray into the eatery business.

During the 2019 Star Awards, Chew was awarded the Special Achievement Award.

== Business ventures ==
In 2017, Chew, Dennis Chew and two other partners opened a Thai Mookata (barbecue-cum-steamboat) stall, 888 Mookata, at a coffee shop in Hougang, Singapore. In 2018, after setting up their third stall, both Chews started a porridge stall, The Famous Zhou, or known in Chinese, Zhou Chu Ming (粥出名), a play on Chew's name and their surnames.

In 2023, Chew with Dennis Chew and two other friends opened a Thai bistro, Viewdee Thai Bistro, at Sprout Hub, Henderson. The same year, Chew, Dennis Chew, food blogger Maureen Ow (Miss Tam Chiak) and another friend opened a coffeeshop with ten stalls in Hougang.

== Personal life ==
Chew graduated from Ngee Ann Polytechnic. He is married to Deon Tan and they have two daughters, born in 2002 and 2004. He revealed during a celebrity talk show in early 2008 that he did not have a happy childhood, often being abused by his overly strict father (a compulsive gambler and alcoholic), who committed suicide when Chew was still in primary school. He began attending a Charismatic church, Renewal Centre from 2007 and was baptised in late November 2008 with his daughters.

=== Illness ===
On 19 December 2008, Chew announced during a church event that he was suffering from Kennedy's disease, a muscular dystrophy illness that resulted in him limping while filming for his latest role as Wang Zhongkun in Love Blossoms II. Chew said that he was diagnosed with the illness in September 2008, and that he alerted the local press as to his condition, but asked the press to not report it yet, as he was psychologically not ready for it. Chew originally planned on officially announcing his illness during the Star Awards 2008 ceremony, due to be held in March 2009. However, signs of his illness can be clearly seen already, and the news was hard to keep under wraps. The illness has also brought on cardiac problems and diabetes for Chew.

Since the illness was revealed, Chew became a member of the local disabled sports club, and has been taking swimming lessons to strengthen his body.

=== Controversy ===
In September 2016, Chew appeared in episode 6 of I Want to Be a Star that had to be taken down from Toggle's website due to public outcry about the show's casual racism. Chew's character said onscreen that Indians and Africans are "all the same". Mediacorp's online service, has apologised on behalf of the show.

== Filmography ==
=== Film ===
Year	Title	Role	Notes	Ref.
1994	Romance in the 7th Month	Hong Dazhi	Telemovie	
2011	It's a Great, Great World	Ah Meng		
2017	Lucky Boy	Lin Chong		

=== Television series ===
Year	Title	Role	Notes	Ref.
1984	The Awakening			
1991	The Last Swordsman (最后一个大侠)	Ying Wu		
1991	The Future Is Mine (锦绣前程)	Luo Dawei		
1992	Fiery Passion (烈焰焚情)	Chen Jiaqi		
1992	Memories of June (六月的童话)	Zhang Yidan		
1992	Crazy Chase (富贵也疯狂)	Li Xiaofei		
1993	Heavenly Beings (再战封神榜)	Fire God		
1993	Angel of Vengeance (暴雨狂花)	Chen Jingui		
1993	The Brave Ones (荡寇英雄)	Yu Jun		
1993	The Witty Advisor (金牌师爷)	Mo Bairen		
1993	Heaven's Will (天机风云)	He Zhenhong		
1994	Young Justice Bao (侠义包公)	Bao Zheng		
1994	Challenge of Truth (铁证柔情)	Lin Haoming		
1994	The Valiant One (昆仑奴)	Mo Ge		
1995	The Teochew Family	Hong San		
1995	Ah Xue II (阿雪II)	Lu Ah He		
1995	Embroidered Banner (花帜)	Hou Yisheng		
1996	Santa, The Happy Ghost (我爱好兄弟)	Shuai Mingjie		
1996	The Unbeatables II	Ding Zhaohui		
1996	Don't Worry, Be Happy (敢敢做个开心人)	Ah Bee		
1997	Crimes and Tribulations (狮城奇案录之凶兆吉日)	Xie Baoxing		
1997	For Better or Worse (精英份子)	Lin Tianming		
1997	Immortal Love (不老传说)	Chen Xiaogui		
1998	The New Adventures of Wisely	Wen Baoyu		
1998	Riding The Storms (陌生人)	Cai Guinan		
1999	Wok of Life (福满人间)	You Ri'an / You Yongfu		
2000	The Legendary Swordsman	Lin Pingzhi		
2000	The Voices Within (心灵物语)	Song Lehui		
2000	Hainan Kopi Tales	Long Ah Sing		
2001	Mr Kiasu	Kiasu		
2001	The Reunion	Li Kechun		
2001	The Hotel	Fang Baiming		
2002	Mr Kiasu II	Kiasu		
2002	Springs of Life	Cai Dapao		
2003	Lobang King	Ah Bee		
2004	Chronicles of Life (我爱我家真情实录之风雨同舟)	Ray		
2005	Oh Mother! (哎哟我的妈!)	Yang Dafu		
2005	You Are The One (二分之一缘分)	Raymond		
2005	My Lucky Charm	Zhang Fengshou		
2007	My Dear Kins (亲本家人)	Zhang Wanglai		
2007	The Golden Path	Huang Kaida		
2008	Love Blossoms II	Wang Zhongkun		
2011	Secrets For Sale	Professor Xie		
2012	Rescue 995	Leo		
2012	Show Hand (注定)	Lai Jianxin		
2012	Joys of Life	Zhao Dagou		
2012	The Day It Rained on Our Parade			
2014–2015	118	Hong Daming		
2016	Don't Worry, Be Healthy	Wu Jiabao		
2016	My First School	Xu Zhengbo		
2016	I Want to Be a Star	Zhong Datian		
2016	Hero	Wei Ge	Cameo	
2016–2017	118 II	Hong Daming		
2018	118 Reunion (118 大团圆)	Hong Daming		
2018	Eat Already? 4	Old Zhou	Cameo	
2018	Fifty & Fabulous (五零高手)	Ye Qihua		
2019	Jalan Jalan (带你去走走)	Zhang Guodong		
2021	The Heartland Hero	Zhong Buzhang		
2022	Dark Angel (黑天使)	Yang Tao		
2022	Love at First Bite (遇见你真香)	De Yao		
2023	Fix My Life	Feng Sheng		
2023	Family Ties	Chen Youde		

=== Variety show ===
Year	Title	Notes	Ref.
2011	Living the Golden Age '11 (黄金年华之光辉岁月)	Host	
2011	Community Chest Truehearts (公益献爱心)	Host	
2010	Living the Golden Age '10 (黄金年华之光辉岁月)	Host	
2009	Food Hometown 2 (美食寻根 2)	Host	
2008	The Fairprice Show (平价与你迎旺年)	Host	
2008	Let's Go Shopping (我们逛街去)	Host	
2007	Never Too Old (新领屋)	Host	
2007	My Beautiful Life (好想美一下)	Host	
2007	True Files V (真实档案 V)	Host	
2006	Fortune Festival at Giant'06 (爱上Giant过肥年'06)	Host	
2006	Kungfu Chef (神厨双怪)	Host	
2006	My Star Guide (Dubai) (我的导游是明星 (迪拜))	Co-Host	
2006	Trivia Trove 2 (不说你不知 2)	Host	
2006	Citispa Beauty Perfection (Citispa完美大挑战)	Host	
2006	True Files IV (真实档案 IV)	Host	
2006	Let's Party With Food 4 (食福满人间 4)	Host	
2005	Trivia Trove (不说你不知)	Host	
2005	Fortune Festival at Giant'05 (爱上Giant过肥年'05)	Host	
2005	True Files III (真实档案 III)	Host	
2005	Perfect 10 (十分十全十美)	Host	
2005	National Day Parade 2005	Co-Host	
2005	Where in Singapore (到底在哪里)	Host	
2005	Let's Party With Food 3 (食福满人间 3)	Host	
2005	Kungfu Chef (神厨双怪)	Host	
2005	Renci Charity Show 2005 (仁心慈爱照万千)	Host	
2004	Flavours of Australia (澳妙新滋味)	Co-Host	
2004	NKF Charity Show 2004 (群星照亮千万心之星光再现人间情)	Host	
2004	Spring and Slide (威力无比加油站)	Host	
2003	Tiger Club Crawl (Tiger寻Fun作乐)	Host	
2003	True Hearts'03 (公益献爱心)	Host	
2001	Tonite With Chor Meng (夜猫行动)	Host	
2001	Super Movie Fan Club (超级影迷俱乐部)	Host	
2001	Lunar New Year Special 2001 (金蛇运转贺新年)	Co-Host	
2001	All Stars Variety 2001 (全星展艺献温情)	Host	
2000	Affairs of the Heart (心手相连)	Host	
1999	Star Search (才华横溢出新秀)	Host	
1995	City Beat (城人杂志)	Co-host	
1995	Star Search (才华横溢出新秀)	Host	
1995	Variety Tonight – Now You Know (1995 原来如此)	Host	
1994	Chew on Eight (河畔飘香尝美食)	Host	
1993	Star Search (才华横溢出新秀)	Host	

== Discography ==
=== Compilation album ===
Year	English title	Mandarin title
2013	MediaCorp Music Lunar New Year Album 13	新传媒群星金蛇献祥福
2014	MediaCorp Music Lunar New Year Album 14	新传媒群星金马献万福
2015	MediaCorp Music Lunar New Year Album 15	新传媒群星金羊添吉祥
2018	MediaCorp Music Lunar New Year Album 18	新传媒群星阿狗狗过好年

== Awards and nominations ==
Year	Award	Category	Nominated work	Results	Ref
1994	Star Awards	Top 10 Most Popular Male Artistes	—N/a	Won	
1995	Star Awards	Best Actor	Challenge Of Truth	Nominated	
1995	Star Awards	Top 10 Most Popular Male Artistes	—N/a	Won	
1996	Star Awards	Best Actor	The Teochew Family	Nominated	
1996	Star Awards	Top 10 Most Popular Male Artistes	—N/a	Won	
1997	Star Awards	Top 10 Most Popular Male Artistes	—N/a	Won	
1998	Star Awards	Best Actor	Immortal Love	Nominated	
1998	Star Awards	Best Comedy Performer	Don't Worry Be Happy 4	Nominated	
1998	Star Awards	Top 10 Most Popular Male Artistes	—N/a	Won	
1999	Star Awards	Best Actor	Wok Of Life (as You Ri'an / You Yongfu)	Nominated	
1999	Star Awards	Top 10 Most Popular Male Artistes	—N/a	Won	
2000	Star Awards	Best Actor	Hainan Kopi Tales	Won	
2000	Star Awards	Top 10 Most Popular Male Artistes	—N/a	Won	
2001	Star Awards	Top 10 Most Popular Male Artistes	—N/a	Won	
2002	Star Awards	Best Actor	The Reunion	Nominated	
2002	Star Awards	Top 10 Most Popular Male Artistes	—N/a	Won	
2003	Star Awards	Best Actor	Springs Of Life	Nominated	
2003	Star Awards	Best Comedy Performer	Lobang King	Nominated	
2003	Star Awards	Top 10 Most Popular Male Artistes	—N/a	Won	
2004	Star Awards	All-Time Favourite Artiste	—N/a	Won	
2009	Star Awards	Best Supporting Actor	The Golden Path	Won	
2010	Star Awards	Best Info-Ed Programme Host	Food Hometown 2	Nominated	
2013	Star Awards	Best Actor	Joys Of Life	Nominated	
2015	Star Awards	Star Awards for Most Popular Regional Artiste (Indonesia)	—N/a	Nominated	
2019	Star Awards	Best Evergreen Artiste	—N/a	Nominated	
2019	Star Awards	Special Achievement Award	—N/a	Won	
2022	Star Awards	Best Supporting Actor	The Heartland Hero (as Zhong Buzhang)	Nominated	
2023	Star Awards	Best Supporting Actor	Dark Angel (as Yang Tao)	Nominated	
