= Mi Lu Bing =

Defunct Singapore rock band

- Origin: Singapore
- Genres: Mandopop
- Years active: 2006–2010
- Labels: Warner Music (2006–2008), Dragon One Entertainment Group (2009–2010)

Mi Lu Bing (literally "lost soldiers") was a Singapore-based rock band who rose to fame after winning the inaugural season of the local band competition SuperBand. The band consists of three members, Chan WeiQi, Nicodemus Lee (Nic) and Samuel Wong (Sam). The band's first album sold 5,000 copies, but its second album sold only 2,000 copies.

== Members ==
- Nic Lee (Real Name: Nicodemus Lee (Chinese: 李顺利), Birth Date October 8, 1984 (age 40)) Nic is the guitarist of the band. In 2005, he emerged winner for Original Composition at the annual nationwide talent competition, Talent Quest. He gave up a place in Diploma in Engineering Informatics for the closest to music production, and got a Diploma in Audio Engineering at School of Audio Engineering (SAE).
- Samuel Wong (Real Name: Samuel Wong Rui Xiang (Chinese: 王瑞祥), Birth Date: October 17, 1986 (age 38)) Sam is the drummer of the band and plays the guitar when performances do not require drumming and is also a freelance drums instructor. He graduated from Saint Andrew's School.
- Wei Qi (Real Name: Chan Wei Qi (Chinese: 陈伟奇), Birth Date: January 31, 1985 (age 40)) Wei Qi is the keyboardist of the band. Wei Qi studied in Chung Cheng High School and Nanyang Technological University.

== Awards ==
Singapore Hit Awards 2007《新加坡金曲奖 2007》:

- Won Best Newcomer Award 最佳新人奖
- Nominated for Most Popular Newcomer 提名最受欢迎新人
- Nominated for Most Popular Group 提名最受欢迎团体
- Nominated for Best Composer 提名最佳本地作词《泪》
- Nominated for Best Local Singer 提名最佳本地歌手奖
- Nominated for Best Band 提名最佳乐团奖

Champion of SuperBand 2006 《非常SuperBand》冠军

== Discography ==
To date, Mi Lu Bing released 3 albums and involved in 6 compilation albums :

=== Albums ===
Album #	Album Information
1st	Mi Lu Bing: Released: 9 July 2007 (Singapore); Language: Mandarin Chinese; Label: Warner Music; Genre: Mandopop
2nd	Triangle: Released: 24 September 2008 (Singapore); Language: Mandarin Chinese; Label: Warner Music; Genre: Mandopop
3rd	Meal for Three: Released: 9 November 2009 (Singapore); Language: Mandarin Chinese; Label: Dragon One Entertainment; Genre: Mandopop

=== Compilation albums ===
1. Best Of 非常 Superband
2. December Stars 2006
3.《群星贺岁 金猪庆丰年》
4. December Stars 2007
5. 星光大道
6.《黄金主题曲》合辑
7.《群星贺岁 福牛迎瑞年》

Preceded by N/A	Winner of SuperBand; 2006	Succeeded by Tu Zi
