= The Awakening (TV series) =

- The Awakening 雾锁南洋
- Genre: Period drama
- Created by: Liang Liren (梁立人); Jiang Long （江龙）
- Developed by: Yang Ji (杨基)
- Written by: Soh Choon Heng (苏春兴); Wu De (吴德); Gan Huibao (甘惠宝); Liang Zhihua (梁志华)
- Starring: Huang Wenyong; Xiang Yun; Chen Shucheng; Huang Peiru; Qian Zhigang; Li Yongxi; Wang Yuqing; Hong Huifang
- Opening theme: Wu Suo Nan Yang (雾锁南洋) sung by Sun Zhenfu (孙振福）
- Country of origin: Singapore
- Original language: Chinese
- No. of episodes: 53

Production
- Executive producer: Lai Shuiqing (赖水清)
- Producer: Xie Xilun （谢希伦）
- Production location: Singapore
- Production company: Singapore Broadcasting Corporation

Original release
- Network: SBC 8
- Release: 6 February – 12 October 1984

The Awakening (Traditional Chinese: 霧鎖南洋, Simplified Chinese: 雾锁南洋) is a 1984 Singapore's official first local blockbuster drama series produced by Singapore Broadcasting Corporation to celebrate the nation's 25th National Day celebrations. The series mainly covers the Chinese Singaporean experience in Singapore, from the first generation of Chinese immigrants who arrived on a relatively undeveloped island, through the Japanese occupation periods, and to the Chinese Singaporeans in the present day (1984), who reside in a developed nation that is radically different from the land their ancestors arrived at. The Chinese Drama Division’s first major success was The Awakening in 1984 a highly popular series about the toils and troubles of Singapore’s early Chinese immigrants in the 19th century. The Awakening's grand opening took place as Singapore's official first local long-length blockbuster drama on 6 February 1984 during Chinese New Year holiday. The Awakening official celebration took place on its forty years of anniversary since its original broadcast on 6 February 2024 during Chinese New Year holiday.

== Synopsis ==
There are two parts to the series, and two sections in each of the parts:

The first series consisted of two parts, The Awakening: Eternity (霧鎖南洋之地久天長) and The Awakening: Before the Dawn of the Lion City (霧鎖南洋之獅城拂曉/雾锁南洋之狮城拂晓). The former covers the lives of Chinese Singaporeans, who came to Singapore as migrants from China in the early part of the 20th century and the latter covers the Japanese occupation of Singapore. The series covers the period between 1920 and 1945.

The second series consisted of two parts, The Awakening: Through the Storm Together (霧鎖南洋之風雨同舟/雾锁南洋之风雨同舟) and The Awakening: Dawn at the Equator (霧鎖南洋之赤道朝陽/雾锁南洋之赤道朝阳). The former covers the years after the Japanese occupation, and the events that led to Singapore's independence, and the latter covers the development of Singapore after its independence.

== Cast ==
1st series

- Huang Wenyong as He Ah Shui
- Xiang Yun as Ah Mei
- Wang Yuqing as He Guorui
- Chen Shucheng as Dr Chuang Yuanhe
- Huang Peiru as Qian Tianlan
- Li Jian Han as He Tian Sheng
- Li Yong Xi as Chuang De Xing
- Xu Lin as Chuang Xiaolan
- Chen Bi Feng as Xiao Pei
- Ngiam Bo Ngiam as Yuan Long
- Wu Weiqiang as Qian Jiacheng
- Chen Juanjuan as Mrs Qian
- He Jie as Qian Yuwei
- Candlelane Chen Tiansong as Kawashima
- Qian Zhigang as Hu De
- Wang Xiang Qin as He Zhu Sheng
- Steven Woon as Ah Xiang
- Hong Peixing as He Ah Bing
- Teh Poh Khoon as Xiu Gu
- Dai Peng

2nd series

- Xu Lin
- Li Wenhai
- Li Yinzhu
- Huang Wenyong
- Xiang Yun
- Hong Huifang
- Candlelane Chen Tiansong
- Hugo Ng
- Li Huiyan
- Chen Tianwen
- Liu Qiu Lian
- Chen Shucheng

== Production ==
An outdoor studio was built at the cost of $500,000 to film the drama. Period costumes and antiques were sourced overseas to match the era of the drama.

== Reception ==
The first series of the drama received an audience of 800,000 adults.

== Legacy ==
The Awakening is often seen as one of Singapore's pioneer Chinese Dramas. To this day, it is considered a Classic among Singaporean viewers and the theme song remains popular. Actors Huang Wenyong and Xiang Yun were catapulted to fame through this drama. The second main actor and actress Chen Shucheng and Huang Peiru who played a couple, eventually married after the drama was broadcast.

Perfect World Pictures (Singapore) will be shooting a reboot of the series in 2018 with Tay Ping Hui in a starring role.
