= Chen Liping =

Singaporean actress (born 1965)

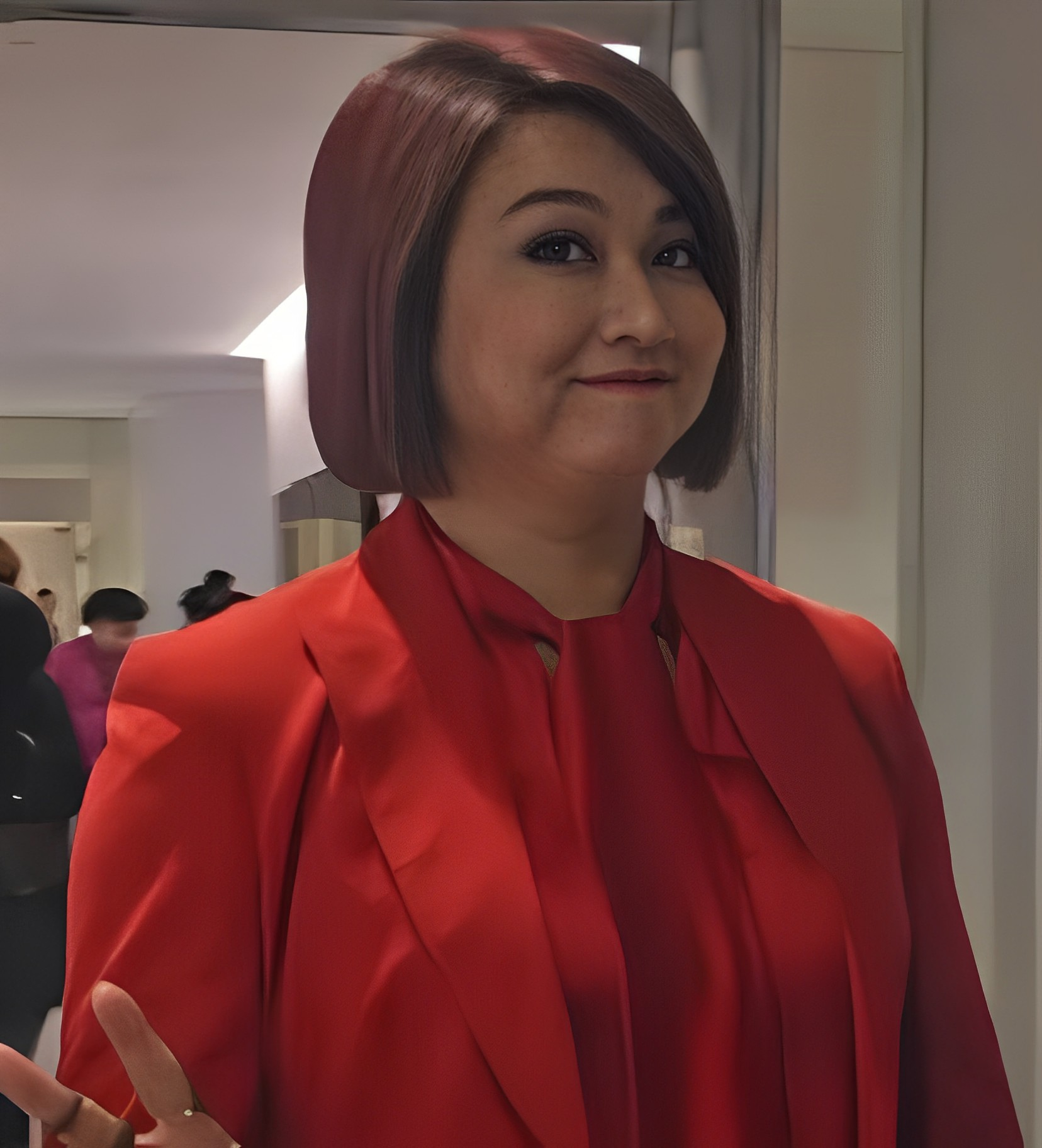
- Chen at the Star Awards 2017
- Born: Tan Lee Peng; 22 August 1965 (age 61); Singapore
- Education: Crescent Girls' School
- Occupations: Actress; model
- Years active: 1985–present
- Spouse: Rayson Tan (m. 1998)
- Children: 1
- Awards: Full list

Chinese name
- Simplified Chinese: 陈莉萍
- Traditional Chinese: 陳莉萍
- Hanyu Pinyin: Chén Lìpíng

Chen Liping (born Tan Lee Peng on 22 August 1965) is a Singaporean actress. Formerly with Mediacorp and Hype Records, Chen won three Best Actress Awards in the Star Awards awarded by Mediacorp.

== Career ==
Chen began her acting career in 1985 with the Singapore Broadcasting Corporation after completing the drama training course. She is best known for her role as Shen Rong or "Miss Ai-Yo-Yo" (哎哟哟老师) in the Singapore Chinese drama series Good Morning, Sir!, which earned her a "Most Unforgettable TV Character" Award in Star Awards 2003. Her character was also voted the most memorable character at MediaCorp Channel 8's 45th anniversary special in 2008 and the top 5 most memorable characters poll at the Star Awards 2007 anniversary special celebrating 25 years of Chinese language drama in Singapore.

In 2003, Chen won her first Best Actress Award for her role, Mo Wanwan in Holland V. She won the Best Actress Award for the second time in Star Awards 2010 for her role as a thrifty housewife in Reunion Dinner. In 2014, Chen won the Best Actress award once again for her role as Yao-Zhu Kangli, a successful career woman in the media industry facing marital issues in The Dream Makers.

In 2017, she completed the drama Mightiest Mother-in-Law, followed by the long-form drama Life Less Ordinary.

In 2018, she appeared in Say Cheese along with Joanne Peh. She appeared in dialect drama How Are You and in 2019, appeared in long-form drama, Old is Gold along with Rui En, Xu Bin and Bonnie Loo.

In March 2023, Chen portrayed her first English drama role in the second season of Titoudao: Dawn Of New Stage, a televised drama adaptation of a stageplay with the same title.

In January 2025, Chen announced she left Mediacorp but will continue in the industry.

== Personal life ==
Chen attended Crescent Girls' School from 1978 to 1983. She married fellow actor Rayson Tan in 1998, and they have a son born in 2002.

== Filmography ==
=== Television series ===
| Year | Title | Role | Notes | Ref. |
|---|---|---|---|---|
| 1985 | Takeover | | | |
| 1985 | The Young Heroes | | | |
| 1985 | The Coffeeshop | | | |
| 1986 | Men of Valour 盗日英雄传 | | | |
| 1986 | The Bond | | | |
| 1987 | I Do | | | |
| 1988 | Silk and Satin | | | |
| 1988 | Airforce | | | |
| 1988 | Teahouse in Chinatown | | | |
| 1988 | Song of Youth | | | |
| 1989 | Good Morning, Sir! | Shen Rong / "Miss Ai-Yo-Yo" (哎哟哟老师) | | |
| 1989 | Splash to Victory | | | |
| 1990 | When Dawn Breaks | | | |
| 1990 | Sweet Dreams | | | |
| 1990 | The Winning Team | | | |
| 1991 | Golden Shenton Way | | | |
| 1991 | The Legend of a Beauty | | | |
| 1992 | Fiery Passion | | | |
| 1992 | Duel La Shanghai | | | |
| 1992 | Love is in the Air | | | |
| 1993 | Hidden Truths | | | |
| 1993 | Web of Deceit | | | |
| 1994 | Dreams Come True | | | |
| 1994 | Twin Bliss | | | |
| 1995 | The Rangers | | | |
| 1995 | Heartbeat | | | |
| 1995 | It's My World | | | |
| 1996 | A Teacher's Diary | | | |
| 1996 | Three in One Love | | | |
| 1997 | My Wife, Your Wife, Their Wives | | | |
| 1998 | Riding by the Storm | | | |
| 1998 | My Teacher, Aiyoyo! | | | |
| 1999 | Darling-In-Law | | | |
| 2001 | The Stratagem | Le Zining | | |
| 2001 | Beyond the Axis of Truth | Jiang Meiqi | | |
| 2001 | The Hotel | Pang Yuyun (Dodo) | | |
| 2002 | No Problem | Bao Jinlian | | |
| 2003 | Holland V | Mo Wanwan | | |
| 2004 | The Ties That Bind | Ma Yujia | | |
| 2004 | A Child's Hope II | Zhang Huilian | | |
| 2005 | Baby Blues | Chen Qiaohua | | |
| 2005 | Zero to Hero | Zhong Lizhi | | |
| 2007 | Happily Ever After | Wangmu Niangniang | | |
| 2007 | The Golden Path | Xiao-gu | | |
| 2008 | Just in Singapore | Nancy | | |
| 2009 | Reunion Dinner | Ah Ping | | |
| 2009 | Your Hand In Mine | Zhang Yuxiang | | |
| 2010 | Unriddle | Lin Zhengyi | | |
| 2012 | Unriddle 2 | Lin Zhengyi | | |
| 2012 | Joys of Life | Jin Yinjiao | | |
| 2013 | It's A Wonderful Life | Fan Wenxiang | | |
| 2013 | The Dream Makers | Yao-Zhu Kangli | | |
| 2014 | Yes We Can! | Liu Cailing | | |
| 2015 | A Blessed Life | Ye Da | | |
| 2015 | Good Luck | Lin Xiaozhen | | |
| 2015 | Life - Fear Not | Lin Jiajia | | |
| 2016 | My First School | Chen Xiujuan | | |
| 2016 | Eat Already? | Miss Chen | Cameo | |
| 2017 | Mightiest Mother-in-Law | Liew Xiuzhu | | |
| 2017 | Life Less Ordinary | Chen Feng | | |
| 2018 | Say Cheese | Hong Ziyi | | |
| 2019 | How Are You? | Guo Meili | | |
| 2019 | How Are You? | Dai Anna | | |
| 2019 | Hello Miss Driver | Li Yuzhu | | |
| 2019 | Old Is Gold | Elizabeth Pang | | |
| 2019 | Old Is Gold: The Bliss Keeper | Elizabeth Pang | Telemovie | |
| 2020 | How Are You? 2 | Dai Anna | | |
| 2020 | Recipe of Life | Qin Xihong | | |
| 2023 | Titoudao: Dawn Of New Stage | Suan Jiah | | |
| 2023 | The Sky is Still Blue | Hong Aixi | | |
| 2025 | Emerald Hill - The Little Nyonya Story | Cai Zhu Niang/Ah Zhu | | |

=== Film ===
| Year | Title | Role | Notes | Ref. |
|---|---|---|---|---|
| 1992 | ABC English for Children (VOL 1) | Teacher | | |
| 1993 | ABC English for Children : Telling Time (VOL 2) | Teacher | | |
| 1994 | ABC English for Children : Let's Learn About (VOL 3) | Teacher | | |
| 1994–1997 | Television Corporation of Singapore | | | |
| 1995 | ABC English for Children : Let's Learn About (VOL 4) | Teacher | | |
| 1996 | ABC English for Children : Let's Learn About (VOL 5) | Teacher | | |
| 1997 | ABC English for Children : Let's Learn About (VOL 6) | Teacher | | |
| 2004 | The Best Bet | Richard's wife | | |
| 2011 | The Ultimate Winner | Staff Sergeant | | |

== Awards and nominations ==
| Organisation | Year | Category | Nominated work | Result | Ref. |
|---|---|---|---|---|---|
| Star Awards | 1994 | Top 5 Most Popular Female Artistes | —N/a | Won | |
| Star Awards | 1995 | Best Actress | Heartbeat | Nominated | |
| Star Awards | 1995 | Top 10 Most Popular Female Artistes | —N/a | Won | |
| Star Awards | 1996 | Top 10 Most Popular Female Artistes | —N/a | Won | |
| Star Awards | 1997 | Top 10 Most Popular Female Artistes | —N/a | Won | |
| Star Awards | 1998 | Top 10 Most Popular Female Artistes | —N/a | Won | |
| Star Awards | 1999 | Top 10 Most Popular Female Artistes | —N/a | Won | |
| Star Awards | 2000 | Top 10 Most Popular Female Artistes | —N/a | Won | |
| Star Awards | 2001 | Best Actress | Beyond the Axis of Truth | Nominated | |
| Star Awards | 2001 | Top 10 Most Popular Female Artistes | —N/a | Nominated | |
| Star Awards | 2002 | Best Actress | No Problem | Nominated | |
| Star Awards | 2002 | Top 10 Most Popular Female Artistes | —N/a | Won | |
| Star Awards | 2003 | Best Actress | Holland V | Won | |
| Star Awards | 2003 | Top 10 Most Popular Female Artistes | —N/a | Nominated | |
| Star Awards | 2004 | Best Supporting Actress | A Child's Hope II | Nominated | |
| Star Awards | 2004 | Top 10 Most Popular Female Artistes | —N/a | Won | |
| Star Awards | 2005 | Top 10 Most Popular Female Artistes | —N/a | Won | |
| Star Awards | 2006 | All-Time Favourite Artiste | —N/a | Won | |
| Star Awards | 2009 | Best Actress | Just in Singapore | Nominated | |
| Star Awards | 2009 | Best Actress | The Golden Path | Nominated | |
| Star Awards | 2010 | Best Actress | Reunion Dinner | Won | |
| Star Awards | 2011 | Best Actress | Unriddle | Nominated | |
| Star Awards | 2014 | Best Actress | The Dream Makers | Won | |
| Star Awards | 2014 | Most Popular Regional Artiste (China) | —N/a | Nominated | |
| Star Awards | 2014 | Most Popular Regional Artiste (Indonesia) | —N/a | Nominated | |
| Star Awards | 2014 | Most Popular Regional Artiste (Malaysia) | —N/a | Nominated | |
| Star Awards | 2015 | Most Popular Regional Artiste (China) | —N/a | Nominated | |
| Star Awards | 2015 | Most Popular Regional Artiste (Indonesia) | —N/a | Nominated | |
| Star Awards | 2015 | Most Popular Regional Artiste (Malaysia) | —N/a | Nominated | |
| Star Awards | 2015 | Most Popular Regional Artiste (Cambodia) | —N/a | Nominated | |
| Star Awards | 2017 | Best Speech Award | —N/a | Nominated | |
| Star Awards | 2018 | Best Actress | Mightiest Mother-In-Law | Nominated | |
| Star Awards | 2018 | Best Theme Song | Life Less Ordinary | Nominated | |
| Star Awards | 2021 | Best Actress | How Are You? | Nominated | |
| Star Awards | 2022 | Perfect Combo (with Kym Ng) | HDB Tai Tai 4.0 | Nominated | |
| Star Awards | 2024 | Best Supporting Actress | The Sky Is Still Blue | Nominated | |
| Star Awards | 2026 | Best Supporting Actress | Emerald Hill - The Little Nyonya Story | Won | |
| Star Awards | 2026 | The Show Stealer | Emerald Hill - The Little Nyonya Story | Nominated | |
| Star Awards | 2026 | Most Emotional Performance | Emerald Hill - The Little Nyonya Story | Nominated | |
