= Star Awards for YES 933 Best Speech =

Singaporean media award (2011–2016)

Star Awards for YES 933 Best Speech YES 933星光魅力奖
- Awarded for: Best Speech by a Mediacorp Artiste in Star Awards
- Country: Singapore
- Presented by: Mediacorp; YES 933
- First award: 2011
- Final award: 2016
- Currently held by: Elvin Ng 黄俊雄 (2016)

The Star Awards for YES 933 Best Speech was an award presented annually at the Star Awards, a ceremony that was established in 1994. It is presented by YES 933, a Mediacorp radio station since 1990.

The category was introduced in 2011, at the 17th Star Awards ceremony; Qi Yuwu received the award and it is given in honour of a Mediacorp artiste who has delivered an outstanding speech in the Star Awards. The winners are selected by a majority vote from a team of judges employed by Mediacorp.

Since its inception, the award was given to six artistes. Elvin Ng is the most recent winner in this category.

The award has been discontinued since 2017.

== Recipients ==
Year	Artiste (award won)	Ref
2011	Qi Yuwu (Best Actor)	
2012	Kym Ng (Top 10 Most Popular Female Artistes)	
2013	Lin Meijiao (Best Supporting Actress)	
2014	Chen Hanwei (All-Time Favourite Artiste)	
2015	Vivian Lai (All-Time Favourite Artiste)	
2016	Elvin Ng (Top 10 Most Popular Male Artistes)	
