= Lin Meijiao =

Singaporean actress (born 1963)

- Born: 24 December 1963 (age 62); Singapore
- Education: Ahmad Ibrahim Secondary School
- Occupation: Actress
- Years active: 1980s–present
- Agents: Mediacorp; The Celebrity Agency
- Spouse: Huang Yiliang (m. 1991; div. 1997)
- Children: Chantalle Ng
- Awards: Star Awards: Best Supporting Actress 2013, 2019, 2022; YES 933 Best Speech 2013

Chinese name
- Traditional Chinese: 林梅嬌
- Simplified Chinese: 林梅娇
- Hanyu Pinyin: Lín Méijiāo

Lin Meijiao (born Lim Mooi Keow on 24 December 1963) is a Singaporean actress. She won three Best Supporting Actress at Mediacorp's annual Star Awards.

== Life and career ==
Lin was educated at Ahmad Ibrahim Secondary School.

Lin has acted in many drama serials and is a multi-nominee for the Best Supporting Actress category at the annual Star Awards. She was awarded the Best Supporting Actress at the 1995 Shanghai International Film Festival for her role in the drama serial Silk of Love.

In 2002, her performance in Brotherhood, a regional co-production starring Hong Kong artiste Jordan Chan and MediaCorp actor Christopher Lee, scored her a nomination in the Best Supporting Actress category in the Star Awards.

Lin was cast in numerous MediaCorp blockbuster dramas, such as The Little Nyonya, Breakout and Joys of Life. Lin also co-hosted Golden Age, a variety show for senior citizens and was part of the cast for the second season of the hit sitcom Family Combo.

After being in showbiz for 28 years, Lin won her first Best Supporting Actress award at the Star Awards 2013 for her role as a con artist in Game Plan. Lin was visibly surprised with regard to her win. Prior to this, she had been nominated in the category for eight times, but had never won. At the Star Awards 2019, Lin won her second Best Supporting Actress award for her role in Fifty & fabulous.

== Personal life ==
Lin is a Buddhist.

Lin married actor Huang Yiliang in 1991; they divorced in 1997 soon after Lin gave birth to their daughter, Chantalle Ng. When interviewed in 2009, Huang attributed their split to their differences in characters and philosophies in life. Lin in an interview with 8days, a Singaporean magazine, in 2017, said there were no more feelings for Huang and wanted a clean break.

== Filmography ==
=== Television series ===
| Year | Title | Role | Notes | Ref. |
|---|---|---|---|---|
| 1985 | Coffee Shop | | | |
| 1985 | Home Is Where Love Is | | | |
| 1985 | Young Heroes | | | |
| 1985 | Son of Pulau Ubin | | | |
| 1985 | Takeover | | | |
| 1986 | Paint A Rainbow | | | |
| 1986 | The Bond | | | |
| 1986 | Crossroad | | | |
| 1986 | Samsui Women | | | |
| 1986 | Men of Valour (盗日英雄传) | Ku Guagan | | |
| 1987 | On The Fringe | | | |
| 1987 | Strange Encounters | | | |
| 1987 | Neighbours | | | |
| 1987 | I Do | | | |
| 1987 | Fury of the Dragon | | | |
| 1987 | Painted Faces | | | |
| 1988 | Teahouse in Chinatown | Li Lijun | | |
| 1989 | The Sword Rules | | | |
| 1989 | Fortune Hunter | | | |
| 1990 | Marry Me | | | |
| 1990 | By my Side | | | |
| 1990 | When Dawn Breaks | | | |
| 1991 | Pretty Faces | Ding Qiqi | | |
| 1991 | The Other Women | | | |
| 1992 | Duel in Shanghai | | | |
| 1992 | Ladies in Action | Qi Xin | | |
| 1993 | The Brave Ones | | | |
| 1994 | Slik of Love | | | |
| 1994 | Bond of Love | | | |
| 1997 | Roses, Complete With Thorns | | | |
| 1997 | The Fall Guy | | | |
| 1998 | Driven by a Car | | | |
| 1998 | Dreams | | | |
| 1999 | Hero of the Times | Abbess Babao | | |
| 1999 | From The Courtroom | | | |
| 2000 | The Legendary Swordsman | | | |
| 2000 | Hainan Kopi Tales | Huang Jin Mei | | |
| 2000 | The Voices Within | | | |
| 2000 | Knotty Liaison | | | |
| 2001 | Three Women and A Half | | | |
| 2002 | Springs of Life | | | |
| 2002 | Brotherhood | Chen Yi | | |
| 2002 | Viva Le Famille | Stella | | |
| 2003 | A Toast of Love | Stella | | |
| 2003 | Romance De Amour | Xu Fangning | | |
| 2003 | True Heroes | Zhong Xiaolan | | |
| 2003 | Viva Le Famille 2 | Stella | | |
| 2003 | Heath Matters | | | |
| 2004 | My Mighty in Laws | Yao Jiao Jiao | | |
| 2004 | A Child's Hope | | | |
| 2004 | Spice Siblings | Zhang Ling Long | | |
| 2004 | Chronicles of Life | | | |
| 2005 | C.I.D | Sun Lifeng | | |
| 2005 | Women of Times | Wang Guiying | | |
| 2005 | A Promise For Tomorrow | | | |
| 2005 | Beyond The Axis Of Truth 2 | | | |
| 2005 | Family Combo | | | |
| 2006 | Life Story: Delinquet Turned Good | | | |
| 2006 | Family Matters | Gao Wei | | |
| 2007 | Taste of Love | | | |
| 2007 | Switched! (幸运星) | Shixuan's Mother | | |
| 2007 | Kinship Part 1 | Lin Mei Xue | | |
| 2007 | Kinship Part 2 | Lin Mei Xue | | |
| 2007 | Let It Shine | Chen Meihua | | |
| 2007 | The Peak | Ling Ling | | |
| 2008 | Rhythm of Life | Tianbao's mother | | |
| 2008 | Love Blossoms | Pan Qiulian | | |
| 2008 | Love Blossoms II | Pan Qiulian | | |
| 2008 | The Little Nyonya | Lin Guihua | | |
| 2009 | The Dream Catchers | Cai Aili | | |
| 2009 | My School Daze | Huang Liqin | | |
| 2009 | The Ultimatum | Shen Suzhen | | |
| 2009 | Baby Bonus | Long Baoyin | | |
| 2010 | New Beginnings | Yan Ruyi | | |
| 2010 | No Limits | Wang Ruoyun | | |
| 2010 | Unriddle | He Lizhen | | |
| 2010 | Breakout | Bai Huahua | | |
| 2011 | Secrets For Sale | Bao Huimei | | |
| 2011 | Devotion | Zhang Yuxi | | |
| 2011 | Love Thy Neighbour | Huang Lingbo | | |
| 2012 | Unriddle 2 | He Yazhi | | |
| 2012 | Joys of Life | Liu Daiyu | | |
| 2012 | Game Plan | Zhang Shiyun | | |
| 2013 | It's a Wonderful Life | Amy Chen Daizhu | | |
| 2013 | Gonna Make It | Zhou Meina | | |
| 2014 | Soup of Life | Liang Yueyin | | |
| 2014 | In The Name Of Love | Huang Yanqiu | | |
| 2014 | Mystic Whispers (听) | Chen Huijun | | |
| 2015 | You Can Be an Angel Too | Zhou Haoyun | | |
| 2015 | A Blessed Life | Bai Meilin | | |
| 2015 | Let It Go (分手快乐) | Yan's Mother | | |
| 2015 | Life Is Beautiful | Huang Cuijiao | | |
| 2015 | The Journey: Our Homeland | Su Qiufeng | | |
| 2015 | Hand In Hand | Wang Shuhua | | |
| 2015 | Life - Fear Not | Huang Jinhua | | |
| 2016 | If Only I Could | Zeng Wanjie | | |
| 2016 | Peace & Prosperity | Lin Shuzhi | | |
| 2016 | Soul Reaper (勾魂使者) | Song Rufen | | |
| 2017 | Mightiest Mother-in-Law | Wu Xianglan | | |
| 2017 | Eat Already? 3 | Toujia Niang | | |
| 2018 | Fifty & Fabulous (五零高手) | Ma Keqing | | |
| 2018 | Say Cheese | Aisha | | |
| 2019 | Jalan Jalan (带你去走走) | Wei Zhenzhu | | |
| 2019 | After The Stars (攻星计) | Zhang Lan | | |
| 2020 | Loving You (爱没有距离) | Xu Lijiao | | |
| 2020 | Super Dad (男神不败) | Xiao Yufang | | |
| 2020 | Bittersweet Love (柠檬苦茶) | Emily | | |
| 2021 | My Star Bride | Pan Xiuqin | | |

=== Film ===
| Year | Title | Role | Notes | Ref. |
|---|---|---|---|---|
| 2022 | My Star Bride - Hi, Mai Phương Thảo | Pan Xiuqin | Telemovie | |

== Awards and nominations ==
| Year | Organisation | Category | Nominated work | Result | Ref |
|---|---|---|---|---|---|
| 1993 | Shanghai TV Film Festival | Best Supporting Actress | Silk of Love | Won | |
| 1995 | Star Awards | Best Supporting Actress | Silk and Romance | Nominated | |
| 1999 | Star Awards | Top 10 Most Popular Female Artistes | —N/a | Nominated | |
| 2000 | Star Awards | Best Actress | Hainan Kopi Tales (as Huang Jinmei) | Nominated | |
| 2000 | Star Awards | Top 10 Most Popular Female Artistes | —N/a | Nominated | |
| 2001 | Star Awards | Best Supporting Actress | Three Women and A Half (as Liang Yanling) | Nominated | |
| 2002 | Star Awards | Best Supporting Actress | Brotherhood (as Chen Yi) | Nominated | |
| 2002 | Star Awards | Top 10 Most Popular Female Artistes | —N/a | Nominated | |
| 2003 | Star Awards | Best Supporting Actress | Romance de Amour (as Xu Fangni) | Nominated | |
| 2006 | Star Awards | Best Supporting Actress | Family Matters (as Gaowei) | Nominated | |
| 2009 | Star Awards | Best Supporting Actress | The Little Nyonya (as Guihua) | Nominated | |
| 2009 | Star Awards | Top 10 Most Popular Female Artistes | —N/a | Nominated | |
| 2011 | Star Awards | Best Supporting Actress | Breakout (as Bai Huahua) | Nominated | |
| 2011 | Star Awards | Top 10 Most Popular Female Artistes | —N/a | Nominated | |
| 2013 | Star Awards | Best Supporting Actress | Game Plan (as Zhang Siuyun) | Won | |
| 2013 | Star Awards | YES93.3FM Best Speech Award | —N/a | Won | |
| 2014 | Star Awards | Top 10 Most Popular Female Artistes | —N/a | Nominated | |
| 2015 | Star Awards | Top 10 Most Popular Female Artistes | —N/a | Nominated | |
| 2016 | Star Awards | Best Evergreen Artiste Award | The Journey: Our Homeland (as Su Qiufeng) | Nominated | |
| 2017 | Star Awards | Top 10 Most Popular Female Artistes | —N/a | Eliminated | |
| 2019 | Star Awards | Best Supporting Actress | Fifty & Fabulous (as Ma Keqing) | Won | |
| 2019 | Star Awards | Top 10 Most Popular Female Artistes | —N/a | Nominated | |
| 2021 | Star Awards | Best Supporting Actress | After the Stars (as Zhang Lan) | Nominated | |
| 2021 | Star Awards | Top 10 Most Popular Female Artistes | —N/a | Nominated | |
| 2022 | Star Awards | Best Supporting Actress | My Star Bride (as Pan Xiuqin) | Won | |
| 2022 | Star Awards | Best Evergreen Artiste | —N/a | Nominated | |
| 2022 | Star Awards | Top 10 Most Popular Female Artistes | —N/a | Nominated | |
