= Star Awards 2003 =

Singaporean television awards

Star Awards 2003 红星大奖2003
- Date: 7 December 2003
- Location: MediaCorp TV Theatre
- Country: Singapore
- Hosted by: Timothy Chao; Chun Guek Lay

Highlights
- Most awards: Holland V (7)
- Most nominations: Holland V (10)
- Best Drama: Holland V
- Special Achèvement Award: Xie Shaoguang 谢韶光

Television/radio coverage
- Network: MediaCorp Channel 8
- Runtime: 180 mins

Star Awards 2003 was an awards ceremony part of the annual Star Awards held by MediaCorp Channel 8 on 7 December 2003. The tenth installment of Star Awards were hosted by Timothy Chao for the sixth consecutive ceremony, along with current affairs hostess and nominee for the Best News and Current Affairs Presenter Chun Guek Lay.

The ceremony gave away 27 awards, six of which were awarded in the Backstage Ceremony and the rest on the main ceremony. The Backstage Ceremony does not have presenters giving out the awards. The awards which would be presented for the last time this ceremony were Malaysia's Favourite Artistes, Malaysia's Favourite Drama Serial, and Special Achievement Award, although these awards were later returned with a revised category, such as Favorite Male and Female Character, Most Popular Regional Artiste, and Social Media Award, and these awards would be awarded on a first show when the show was revamped into a two-show format between 2010 till 2016.

The ceremony also saw an unprecedented record in the history of Star Awards for one drama serial, Holland V, which became the first drama to hold a distinction on sweeping the major award categories (winning Best Drama Serial, Best Actor/Actress, and Best Supporting Actor/Actress), and at the time the series held a record of the most number of nominations and wins, with ten and seven, respectively (the series had since broken by three other dramas, with The Little Nyonya (2009), and seasons one (2013-14) and two (2015-16) of The Dream Makers; the latter was both the current holder and the second drama serial to hold the sweeping distinction).

== Winners and nominees ==
Winners are listed first, highlighted in boldface.

Best Director	Best Screenplay
**Edmund Tse** 谢益文 **– The Unbeatables III** 双天至尊 III	**Ang Eng Tee** 洪荣狄 **– Holland V**
Best Cameraman 最佳摄影	Best Variety Producer 最佳综艺编导
**Lee Heng Soon** 李兴顺 **– Baby Boom**	**Lim Shiong Chiang** 林雄强 **– Star Search 2003**
Best Variety Research Writer 最佳综艺资料撰稿	Best News Story 最佳新闻报道
**Bernard Koh 许良才 – Star Search 2003**	**Tan Bee Leng** 陈美玲 **– 2003 SARS Outbreak** 非典型肺炎 SARS 报道
Best Drama Serial	Best Variety Show
**Holland V**; A Child's Hope; Baby Boom; Springs of Life; The Unbeatables III	**Innocent Moment** 小小儿戏; Comedy Nite 2003 搞笑行动2003; Kin-ergy 亲劲十足; The Mission II 创业无敌手II; Who Wants to Be a Millionaire
Best Variety Special 最佳综艺特备节目	Young Talent Award 青苹果奖
**NKF 10th Anniversary Charity 2003 (Show 2)** 群星照亮千万心 - 天地有爱无极限; Lunar New Year Eve Special 2003 三羊开泰迎新年; NKF 10th Anniversary Charity 2003 (Show 1) 群星照亮千万心 - 滚石星光映狮城; Star Awards 2002; Star Search 2003	**Wang Yu** 王宇 **- Holland V**; Fraser Tiong Kah Kee 张家奇 - Romance De Amour; Jarren Ho Jin Yang 何俊扬 - A Child's Hope 孩有明天; Justin Ho Jin Kiat 何俊杰 - A Child's Hope; Aloysius Pang - A Child's Hope
Best Actor	Best Actress
**Xie Shaoguang - Holland V**; Chew Chor Meng - Springs of Life; Christopher Lee - True Heroes; Li Nanxing - The Unbeatables III; Tay Ping Hui - Love Is Beautiful 美丽家庭	**Chen Liping - Holland V**; Aileen Tan - Romance de Amour; Jacelyn Tay - Romance de Amour; Jeanette Aw - Holland V; Zoe Tay - Baby Boom
Best Supporting Actor	Best Supporting Actress
**Huang Yiliang - Holland V**; Andrew Seow - Love Is Beautiful 美丽家庭; Huang Wenyong - Holland V; Jeff Wang - Holland V; Yao Wenlong - Holland V	**Patricia Mok - Holland V**; Carole Lin - Springs of Life; Hong Huifang - Viva Le Famille II; Lin Meijiao - Romance de Amour; Xiang Yun - Holland V
Best Variety Show Host 最佳综艺主持人	Best Comedy Performer 最佳喜剧演员
**Sharon Au - City Beat 城人杂志**; Dasmond Koh - The Mission II 创业无敌手II; Jeff Wang - City Beat 城人杂志; Bukoh Mary 巫许玛莉 - TGIF 周五越Live越精彩; Dennis Chew - Innocent Moment 小小儿戏	**Mark Lee - Comedy Nite 2003 搞笑行动 2003**; Chew Chor Meng - Lobang King; Huang Yiliang - My Genie II 我爱精灵 II; Jeff Wang - Lobang King; Moses Lim - Comedy Nite 2003 搞笑行动 2003
Best News/Current Affairs Presenter 最佳新闻播报／时事主持人	Best Theme Song 最佳主题曲
**Chua Ying 蔡萦**; Chun Guek Lay 曾月丽; Lin Chi Yuan 林启元; Ng Siew Leng 黄秀玲; Tung Soo Hua	"为明天" **by Michael Wong - A Child's Hope**; "快乐密码" by Judy Theng 邓雪华, Maggie Theng 邓妙华 and Jeni Theng 邓桂华 - Holland V; "装傻" by Sharon Au and Li-Lin - Springs of Life; "灰色地带" by Tay Ping Hui - The Unbeatables III; 身边的你 by Cavin Soh - Viva Le Famille II
Unforgettable Television Role 最难忘电视角色	Most Favorite Television Couple 最受欢迎电视搭挡
**Miss Aiyoyo 哎哟哟 by Chen Liping in Good Morning Teacher** 早安老师; Ah Bee by Chew Chor Meng in Made in Singapore 敢敢做个开心人; Ah Shui 阿水 by Huang Wenyong in The Awakening; Bobo by Zoe Tay in Pretty Faces 三面夏娃; Liang Popo 梁婆婆 by Jack Neo in Comedy Nite 搞笑行动	**Li Nanxing and Zoe Tay**; Christopher Lee and Fann Wong; Xiang Yun and Huang Wenyong
Top Rated Drama Serial 最高收视率电视剧
**Holland V**

=== Special awards ===
==== Special Achievement Award ====
The Special Achievement Award is awarded to a Mediacorp artiste who had made significant contributions in the performance of his/her respective field of profession over the past few years.

- Xie Shaoguang.

==== 40th Anniversary Evergreen Achievement Award ====
The 40th Anniversary Evergreen Achievement Award, in commemoration with the 40th anniversary of the television, was awarded to an evergreen key person in the television industry.

- Comedy duo Wang Sa and Ye Fong.

=== Popularity awards ===
==== Top 10 Most Popular Artiste ====
Top 10 Most Popular Male Artistes	Top 10 Most Popular Female Artistes
**Chew Chor Meng** (Note: 10th Award); **Li Nanxing**; **Xie Shaoguang**; **Jack Neo**; **Christopher Lee**; **Mark Lee**; **Dasmond Koh**; **Edmund Chen**; **Tay Ping Hui**; **Gurmit Singh**; Billy Wang; Chen Hanwei; Chen Shucheng; Dennis Chew; Huang Wenyong; Moses Lim; Rayson Tan; Richard Low; Terence Cao; Vincent Ng	**Zoe Tay**; **Fann Wong**; **Huang Biren**; **Phyllis Quek**; **Jacelyn Tay**; **Sharon Au**; **Xiang Yun**; **Michelle Saram**; **Jeanette Aw**; **Vivian Lai**; Aileen Tan; Chen Liping; Fiona Xie; Florence Tan; Ivy Lee; Li-Lin; Pan Lingling; Patricia Mok; Priscelia Chan; Yvonne Lim

==== Malaysia's Favourite awards ====
Malaysia's Favourite Drama Serial 马来西亚最受欢迎电视剧	Malaysia's Favourite Male Artiste 马来西亚最受欢迎男艺人	Malaysia's Favourite Female Artiste 马来西亚最受欢迎女艺人
**Baby Boom**; Beautiful Connection; Brotherhood 有情有义; Bukit Ho Swee 河水山; The Crime Hunters; Fantasy 星梦情真; Love Is Beautiful 美丽家庭; Love Me, Love Me Not; Moon Fairy 奔月; The Palm of Rulai 如来神掌; Springs of Life 春到人间; The Hotel; The Unbeatables III; The Vagrant; Three Women and A Half; True Heroes	**Li Nanxing**; Chen Han Wei; Chew Chor Meng; Christopher Lee; Gurmit Singh; Huang Wenyong; Jack Neo; Qi Yuwu; Tay Ping Hui; Xie Shaoguang	**Zoe Tay**; Aileen Tan; Fann Wong; Fiona Xie; Huang Biren; Jacelyn Tay; Wong Li Lin; Sharon Au; Xiang Yun; Yvonne Lim

== Ceremony ==
Professional and Technical Awards were presented before the main ceremony via a clip montage due to time constraints. The main awards were presented during the ceremony.

== Performers and presenters ==
The following individuals presented awards or performed musical numbers.

Artistes / Special guests
Carol Cheng	Presented Best Actor and Best Actress
Gallen Lo; Fann Wong	Presented Best Supporting Actor and Best Supporting Actress
Sylvia Chang	Presented Unforgettable Television Role
Zoe Tay; Fann Wong	Presented Young Talent Award
Minister for Home Affairs; Wong Kan Seng	Presented Best Drama Serial, 40th Anniversary Evergreen Achievement Award and Special Achievement Award
Sandra Ng; Shawn Yue	Presented Top 10 Most Favourite Male Artistes
Sylvia Chang; Gallen Lo	Presented Top 10 Most Favourite Female Artistes

== Accolades ==
Date	Award	Category	Result	Ref
2004	Star Awards	Best Variety Special	Nominated	
