= Hainan Kopi Tales =

- 琼园咖啡香
- Genre: Family Drama
- Created by: Koh Teng Liang (许声亮）
- Written by: Chen Chun'an (陈春安）
- Directed by: Chia Mien Yang (谢敏洋）
- Starring: Chew Chor Meng; Cynthia Koh; Florence Tan; Lin Meijiao
- Opening theme: 咖啡香 by Mavis Hee
- Country of origin: Singapore
- Original languages: Chinese, Hainanese
- No. of episodes: 20

Production
- Executive producer: Yeo Saik Pin (杨锡彬）

Original release
- Network: TCS-8
- Release: July 2000

Hainan Kopi Tales (琼园咖啡香) is a Singaporean Chinese drama serial produced by Mediacorp which aired in year 2000 on Channel 8. The drama serial follow the lives of Hainanese in Singapore from the 1960s to the 1990s.

== Story ==
Using Qiong Yuan, a Hainan coffeeshop as a backdrop, this nostalgic drama explores the Hainanese way of life from the 60s to the 80s.

Long Fuyuan (Li Wenhai), a Hainanese coffeeshop owner, has three sons (Long Yongan, Long Yongbiao and Long Yonglin) in Singapore and has two sons (Long Ya Xing and Long Ya Zhou) with his second wife in Indonesia (Once, Long Fuyuan went to Indonesia, was attacked, was taken care of by her, and the two of them got married there). Long's first wife constantly makes life difficult for his second wife and her sons when they move to Singapore and work in Qiong Yuan cafe (Hainanese coffeeshop of Long Fuyuan).

Long Yongan is the owner of a bakery in the neighborhood. He has a wife but can't give birth to a son, so Yongan is always looking for a baby wife to have a son. Long Ya Xing quickly got acquainted and dated Liu Yue (a highly educated girl in the neighborhood) but was considered unworthy by the whole neighborhood because Long Ya Xing did not study much and had to work since childhood. Ya Xing's younger brother Long Ya Zhou also loved Huang Liu Yue but did not dare to confess for fear of his brother's anger.

Long Yongbiao is highly educated and shows contempt for those who are uneducated, dating Wu Lifeng but forcing her to read too much, causing her to actively break up. At that time, Long Fuyuan was tired of seeing his first wife tormenting his second wife's two sons, so he used the excuse to go to the hospital and went to Hainan Island (China). After being oppressed and exploited too much by first wife of his father, Long Ya Xing (Chew Chor Meng) decides to be sailor in order to avoid her, Long Ya Zhou stay in Singapore to take care his mother (the second wife of his father). However, from time to time, Long Ya Xing also returned to Singapore to visit his family for a few months and then got on the boat to continue. Long Ya Xing once went to Hainan Island to meet his father Long Fuyuan and was welcomed by his relatives. Then Long Ya Xing returned to Singapore.

Wu Lifeng and his father Wu XinLiang opened a New Paris cafe, competing with Long Fuyuan's Qiong Yuan cafe. Long Ya Xing, who had been oppressed for a long time at Qiong Yuan cafe and was on vacation in Singapore, went to work at New Paris cafe. Long Fuyuan returned to Singapore from Hainan Island, knowing that Long Ya Xing worked for another cafe, he scolded Ya Xing. But Ya Xing still ignored. After that, Wu Xinliang was in debt because of betting and had to flee to the Netherlands, leave the cafe to Long Ya Xing and ask Long Ya Xing to take care of his daughter Wu Lifeng. Long Ya Xing had to sell the cafe to pay the staff and try to find work for her. Because of her dedication to helping her clean the house and help her find a job, Wu Lifeng fell in love with Long Ya Xing. But Long Ya Xing had to get on a boat to go to the sea when Wu Lifeng had no job. When sending off Long Ya Xing, Wu Lifeng kissed Long Ya Xing's cheek and Huang Liu Yue was jealous when she saw it. Long Ya Xing asked Liu Yue to find a job for Wu Lifeng before getting on the boat, causing Huang Liu Yue to rethink Long Ya Xing's feelings for her. Everything changed very quickly when Long Ya Xing went to sea this time. Wu Lifeng accepted Long Yongan's feelings when he was helped by Long Yongan to collect debt, bring Wu Xinliang's body in the Netherlands to Singapore for burial, catch a mouse for her (because she's scared of mice) and was bought by Long Yongan for a new house. Wu Lifeng was also brought to the family by Long Yongan, making Long Yongan's wife angry, hating Wu Lifeng. And Huang Liu Yue gradually fell in love with Long Ya Zhou and even one night sex with Long Ya Zhou at an inn. The two women Long Ya Xing cares most about each have new men.

Long Yonglin has always opened a job to become a famous actor in Hong Kong like Bruce Lee and found a way to go to Hong Kong. But Long Yonglin is not respected in Hong Kong, acting as a stuntman. Long Ya Xing had a visit to Hong Kong, saw Long Yonglin's situation, advised Yonglin to return to Singapore, and gave Yonglin some money to pay for accommodation and then boarded the boat to continue. Long Yonglin in Hong Kong continues to live a life not taken seriously. On the street, Long Yonglin was attacked by robbers, then he was evicted without money to pay for the motel. Yonglin fought back, they pulled the group to attack. Long Yonglin was frustrated, tried to attack everyone at the studio where he was a stuntman here and then returned to Singapore.

Long Yonglin was quickly despised by his old friends in Singapore because he was just a stuntman in Singapore. Long Yonglin got angry and hit them, they then tried to kill Long Yonglin. Long Yonglin summoned a group of people to form a gang to fight with them. When Long Ya Xing returned to Singapore, Long Yonglin wanted Long Ya Xing to join the fight against them, but was refused by Ya Xing. Long Ya Xing was saddened to learn that his younger brother Long Ya Zhou and Liu Yue had become a couple, but still wished them well. When Wu Lifeng saw Long Ya Xing return, her feelings for him rekindled, often meeting with Long Ya Xing to talk even though she agreed to marry Long Yongan.

Long Yonglin then led his gang to attack, killing many people on the other side and also killing many people on his gang. During one of Long Yonglin's lion dances for the Qiong Yuan cafe, the others pretended to be people and attacked Long Yonglin. Long Yonglin defeated them, and the family gradually learned about Long Yonglin becoming a thug. Long Yonglin ran away from home. The whole family called the police to find Long Yonglin and worried, only Long Yongan did not care about his brother. That night, he went to the house to fix the lights for Wu Lifeng and revealed his true face that he wanted to have a wife and baby boy for him. Wu Lifeng started to get scared, avoiding him but he wanted to have sex with her. At that moment Wu Lifeng's aunt arrived so Wu Lifeng was saved. The next day, Wu Lifeng was teaching Long Yongan's daughters with his wife, Long Yongan came to force the lesson to end early and told the children to go out and play. Then he raised Wu Lifeng to bring him into the room to have sex, but his wife just got back in time. Wu Lifeng then struggled to escape from him. His wife got angry and left the house. Wu Lifeng was criticized by Long Yongan's daughters for making their mother run away from home. Wu Lifeng that night carefully thought over what the children said. The rat entered the house again, making Wu Lifeng scared again. But then Wu Lifeng plucked up the courage to catch that rat himself. Wu Lifeng asked Long Ya Xing how to please the children, Long Ya Xing said: "One would rather destroy 10 temples than destroy a family". At that time in the same bar, Long Yongbiao quarreled with his friend, so he saw Wu Lifeng and Long Ya Xing meet.

On the wedding day, Wu Lifeng ran away from the wedding with Long Yongan. Before leaving, Wu Lifeng waved to Long Ya Xing, Ya Zhou and their mother from the car. Long Yongan's wife then returned to attend her husband's wedding. Long time no see Wu Lifeng, Yongan went to find Long Ya Xing, Ya Zhou and their mother came. They told Yongan how Wu Lifeng waved his hand and fled with the car. Long Yongbiao told Yongan that before the wedding, Lifeng met Long Ya Xing. Yongan thinks that Ya Xing caused Lifeng to run away from the wedding so he hates Ya Xing a lot.

One day Long Ya Xing was about to get on a boat to go to sea when he saw Long Yongbiao gathering many workers and propagating Marxism - Leninism to them, calling them to stand up against their bosses. The police came to attack to arrest them all. Long Ya Xing ran to save Long Yongbiao out. After that, Long Yongbiao was afraid of being arrested, so he brought all the propaganda materials against the Singapore government for Long Yongan's wife to pack and sell. When Long Ya Xing came to the bakery, he discovered that he immediately stopped his sister-in-law from using those documents. Long Yongan just arrived, thinking that Long Ya Xing was having trouble with his business, so Yongan pushed Ya Xing down into the boxes of cakes, causing Ya Xing to be injured.

After spending time hiding outside, Long Yonglin went to Long Ya Xing's house to stay temporarily, then was lured by the gangster to Qiong Yuan cafe to exchange "goods". Long Yonglin was afraid that his parents would find out, so he disguised himself as an old man and entered the shop, but then fought with the same big brother. Yonglin is injured. The whole restaurant was in chaos, everyone ran out. Yonglin shot that big brother and took a little girl hostage to threaten everyone. The child is Long Yongan's son, realizing that Yonglin was holding him, he asked him to spare his life. Yonglin heard the baby call him uncle and could only cry but kept the baby. The police came to surround the Qiong Yuan cafe. Long Ya Xing came to convince that Bruce Lee never took the girl hostage, so Yonglin released the girl. Ya Xing advised Yonglin to confess to the police, but Yonglin called Ya Xing to come near him. Yonglin said that Bruce Lee never surrendered to the enemy, so he raised his gun and shot himself in the head and died. Long Ya Xing was surprised and could only hug Long Yonglin's body, which was slowly falling to the ground. Long Fuyuan and his first wife wept bitterly, leaving the Qiong Yuan cafe for many days to mourn for Long Yonglin.

Tragedy continued to hit when Long Yongbiao was chased by the government, causing Yongbiao to flee to Europe. Long Fuyuan and his first wife were grieving, so they made up with their second wife (the mother of Long Ya Xing and Long Ya Zhou), then the three got on a boat to Hainan Island (China) to visit their old hometown. They entrusted the Qiong Yuan cafe to Long Yongan, Long Ya Xing and Long Ya Zhou to manage. Long Yongan was afraid that the other two brothers would win the cafe, so he was annoyed. Long Ya Xing knew well, so he got on the boat to go to the sea, only Long Ya Zhou willing to help Long Yongan.

When Long Ya Xing was on his way to the sea, he once went to Europe and met Yongbiao, who was working as a coffee shop assistant and bartender there. Long Ya Zhou wants to break up with Liu Yue, wants to bring her back to her brother Long Ya Xing. Liu Yue gets angry and runs off to Hong Kong to do business with her cousin. Long Ya Xing once visited Hong Kong, met Liu Yue and her cousin, and met Wu Lifeng who was working for Liu Yue's cousin's family. Once Long Ya Xing, Wu Lifeng and Liu Yue went out with her cousin, Ya Xing asked Lifeng to pretend to be his lover so that Liu Yue would no longer have feelings for her. Long Ya Xing made an appointment to meet Liu Yue for the last time and then got on a boat to go to the sea. Wu Lifeng ran after her but couldn't keep up, only then did she show that she loved Ya Xing very much.

On Hainan Island, Long Ya Xing's mother was scolded by Long Fuyuan's relatives because she knew that Long Fuyuan had a wife and still married. Her brother saw this and took her home. Long Fuyuan's first wife saw that her husband's health was declining, so she personally went to his second wife's house to pick him up. At that time, Long Ya Xing also went to Hainan Island and defended his mother, forcing his relatives to recognize his mother as a member of the Long family.

Then Long Ya Xing saw Wu Lifeng appear on this Hainan island and followed her. Long Ya Xing was surprised to see that the lazy Wu Lifeng of the past had disappeared, today's Wu Lifeng is very resilient, ready to do anything and she is still managing the largest coffee farm on Hainan Island. Long Ya Xing gradually fell in love with Wu Lifeng more. As Long Fuyuan grew weaker, Long Ya Xing sent a letter to Singapore calling Long Yongan and Long Ya Zhou to Hainan Island to see their father one last time. Long Yongan refused to go because he still managed the Qiong Yuan cafe, only Long Ya Zhou left for Hainan. Father and son Long Fuyuan, Long Ya Xing and Long Ya Zhou rode up the mountain to talk to each other for the last time, then Long Fuyuan died in the car when the car was down the mountain. Knowing that Long Ya Xing was gone again, Wu Lifeng gave her diary and coffee bag to Long Ya Xing. Long Ya Xing walking in the middle of the open road, reading the diary, learned that Wu Lifeng had lived in Hong Kong very hard, helped by Liu Yue to have a place to live and have a job, the idea of wanting to meet Long Ya Xing when she was successful should she worked harder. Long Ya Xing now realizes that Wu Lifeng loves him, so he went back to confess to her and brought her back to Singapore.

At Long Fuyuan's funeral, Long Yongan talked to Ya Xing, seeing Lifeng with Ya Xing even more angry. Yongan asked to hit the two, but his wife stopped him. He beat his wife to the street. Wu Lifeng went to Long Ya Xing's house to stay and help Long Ya Xing's mother. Wu Lifeng then advises Long Ya Zhou not to give up on Liu Yue because Liu Yue in Hainan still loves Ya Zhou. Wu Lifeng also came to apologize to Yongan's wife, but was scolded by Yongan. Yongan saw Lifeng and Ya Xing's mother handing out Lifeng and Ya Xing's wedding invitations and got even more angry. Yongan hit Ya Xing and was seriously injured. Then it was Yongan's mother who had to slap Yongan to wake him up.

The next day, Long Ya Zhou tried to beat Yongan and then announced that he would quit his job at Qiong Yuan cafe. Yongan had no one to help him, had to manage both the bakery and the cafe, used to hire people but everyone was lazy, so he fired again, eventually Yongan got sick. It was Ya Xing who took Yongan to the hospital for treatment. Yongan's wife promised to come back to help her husband with the bakery, Ya Xing promised to help Yongan take care of the cafe.

Long Ya Zhou mustered the courage to go to Hainan Island, trying to get a job in Huang Liu Yue's coffee factory. When Huang Liu Yue saw Ya Zhou, he advised Ya Zhou to go back to Singapore. Ya Zhou showed his affection and brought Huang Liu Yue back to Singapore to help Yongan's wife run the bakery.

When Yongan returned from the hospital, he found the bakery flourished thanks to his wife and Long Ya Zhou, Huang Liu Yue. Then he went to Qiong Yuan cafe and saw Long Ya Xing and Wu Lifeng working hard to serve the customers, making the restaurant so popular. Yongan took the initiative to give Ya Xing a hand.

The drama ends with the double wedding between Long Ya Xing - Wu Lifeng and Long Ya Zhou - Huang Liu Yue.

== Cast ==
- Chew Chor Meng as Long Ya Sing
- Yao Wenlong as Long Yongan
- Ryan Choo as Long Yongbiao
- Vincent Ng as Long Yonglin
- Cynthia Koh as Huang Liu Yue
- Florence Tan as Wu Lifeng
- Lin Meijiao as Long Yongan, Long Yongbiao and Long Yonglin's mother
- Chen Huihui as Long Ya Xing and Long Ya Zhou's mother
- Li Wenhai as Long Fuyuan
- Carole Lin as Long Yongan's wife
- Dai Peng
- Alice Ho

== Production ==
The drama was filmed in Hainan, Hong Kong, Macau, Kota Tinggi, Malaysia and Singapore.

== Reception ==
After the sixth episode was broadcast in Singapore, some Hainanese in Singapore and Malaysia were upset over the episode as certain remarks were deemed insulting to the Hainanese when they had to defer to the Westerners in Singapore. The scene reflected a real life incident where members of the audience beat up actors in a play over 2 lines of dialogue and the dialogue was reproduced in the episode.

Various Hainanese clans and associations in Singapore were upset and demanded a statement from MediaCorp. In Malaysia, Muar's Hainan Association demanded an apology from MediaCorp and requested the remarks to be censored in their foreign export of the show. In response, MediaCorp released a statement expressing their deep regrets over the remarks and did not intend to hurt the Hainanese in Singapore. Hainan Hwee Kuan of Singapore rejected the statement.

== Accolades ==
| Organisation | Award | Nominee | Result | Ref |
|---|---|---|---|---|
| Star Awards 2000 | Best Actor | Chew Chor Meng | Won | |
| Star Awards 2000 | Best Actress | Lin Meijiao | Nominated | |
| Star Awards 2000 | Best Supporting Actor | Yao Wenlong | Nominated | |
| Star Awards 2000 | Best Supporting Actor | Vincent Ng | Nominated | |
| Star Awards 2000 | Best Supporting Actress | Chen Huihui | Nominated | |
| Star Awards 2000 | Best Drama Serial | —N/a | Won | |
| Star Awards 2000 | Best Screenplay | —N/a | Won | |

| Preceded by Stepping Out; 1999 | Star Awards for Best Drama Serial; Hainan Kopi Tales; 2000 | Succeeded by Three Women and A Half; 2001 |
