= A Child's Hope =

- 孩有明天
- Genre: Medical drama
- Written by: Yeo Saik Pin 温雪莹
- Directed by: Loo Yin Kam
- Starring: Tay Ping Hui; Phyllis Quek; Yvonne Lim; Florence Tan; Dasmond Koh
- Opening theme: 为明天 by Lee Wei Song 李伟菘, sung by Michael Wong 光良
- Ending theme: 守护你 sung by Tay Ping Hui 好天气 sung by Tay Ping Hui and Phyllis Quek 心愿 sung by Ivy Lee 我们的地方 sung by Phyllis Quek and Yvonne Lim
- No. of episodes: 44 (Total Number for both Seasons 1 and 2)

Production
- Producer: Yeo Saik Pin

Original release
- Network: MediaCorp TV Channel 8
- Release: 2003 – 2004

A Child's Hope (Chinese: 孩有明天) is a MediaCorp TV Channel 8 Chinese medical drama which stars Tay Ping Hui, Phyllis Quek, Yvonne Lim, Florence Tan and Dasmond Koh. It was aired in 2003 on weekday nights at 9p.m. and ran for 2 seasons and ended its run in 2004. Scenes were filmed at the Singapore General Hospital and National University Hospital. The opening theme 为明天 was used for both seasons. None of the cast members from Season 1 returned for Season 2 as well and features new cast members including Li Nanxing, Jeanette Aw, Chen Liping, Li Yinzhu, Yan Bingliang, Zhang Yaodong and Chen Guohua.

== Plot ==
This medical drama focuses on the working and personal lives of the doctors, social workers and trainee nurses in the paediatric department who care for critically ill children with chronic disease or terminal illness, such as congenital heart diseases and kidney problems.

Using the hospital as a backdrop, the drama brings forth the importance of understanding the true needs of these children and their families. The drama also highlights the strain on the doctors, nurses and social workers who have to strike a balance between wanting the best for their patients and making sure that their actions are 'socially correct'.

The various heroes and angels in this drama include Dr. Huang Junsheng (Tay Ping Hui), the responsible and committed paediatrician who dedicates too much time at the hospital and as a result neglects his girlfriend, Zhang Shanni (Phyllis Quek), a social worker who believes in giving her best to care for the patients and their families; and three nursing student interns from a polytechnic. They are the cool and matured Fang Xiuyue (Yvonne Lim) the bubbly but muddle-headed, Fan Danmei (Florence Tan) and the mission driven Hong Zhonggeng (Dasmond Koh).

== Cast ==
=== Season 1 (2003) ===
==== Main cast ====
- Tay Ping Hui as Dr. Huang Junsheng 黄俊生
- Phyllis Quek as Zhang Shanni 张珊霓
- Yvonne Lim as Fang Xiuyue 方秀月
- Florence Tan as Fan Danmei 范丹美
- Dasmond Koh as Hong Zhonggeng 洪忠耿

==== Other cast ====
- Eunice Olsen as Dr. Joanne Su
- Hong Huifang as Lin Peijin 林佩金
- Chen Shucheng as Zhang Younian 张有年
- Liu Qiulian as Fang Lihua 方丽华
- Michelle Liow as Sally
- Cavin Soh as Fan Danshun 范丹顺
- Moses Lim as Master Hong 洪师傅
- Huang Yiliang as Ding Cheng 丁成 (Uncle Ding)
- Huang Biren as Chen Bimei 陈必梅 (Auntie Ding)
- Aloysius Pang as Ding Weiliang 丁伟良
- Ivy Lee as Yan Lizhu 颜丽珠
- Chen Huihui as Wang Lianxin 王莲心
- Sean Say as Chen Zhigang 陈志刚
- Li Xianmin as Chen Qianqian 陈芊芊

=== Season 2 (2004) ===
- Li Nanxing as Hu Yiming 胡逸名 / Hu Yi Dao 胡一刀
- Jeanette Aw as Lin Jinghao 林静濠, a social worker who is suffering from an incurable illness. She is known to the kids as Sister Jinghao.
- Chen Liping as Zhang Huilan 张慧兰
- Li Yinzhu as Ah Feng 阿丰
- Yan Bingliang as Huang Kuan 黄宽
- Zhang Yaodong as Huang Pinde 黄品德
- Chen Guohua as Guo Jinfu 郭金福

== Accolades ==
Organisation	Year	Category	Nominee(s)	Result	Ref.
Star Awards	2003	Young Talent Award	Jarren Ho 何俊扬	Nominated	
Star Awards	2003	Young Talent Award	Justin Ho 何俊杰	Nominated	
Star Awards	2003	Young Talent Award	Aloysius Pang	Nominated	
Star Awards	2003	Best Drama Serial	—N/a	Nominated	
Star Awards	2003	Best Theme Song	"为明天" by Michael Wong	Won	
Star Awards	2004	Best Actor	Li Nanxing	Nominated	
Star Awards	2004	Best Actress	Jeanette Aw	Nominated	
Star Awards	2004	Best Supporting Actress	Chen Liping	Nominated	
Star Awards	2004	Best Supporting Actress	Li Yinzhu	Won	
Star Awards	2004	Young Talent Award	Jerald Tan 陈杰乐	Nominated	
Star Awards	2004	Young Talent Award	Xiao Liyuan 肖力源	Nominated	
Star Awards	2004	Best Drama Serial	—N/a	Won	
Asian Television Awards	2003	Best Actress	Huang Biren	Highly recommended	

== See also ==
- List of programmes broadcast by Mediacorp Channel 8

Preceded by Holland V 2003	Star Awards for Best Drama Serial; A Child's Hope (season 2); 2004	Succeeded by A New Life; 2005
