= Bukit Ho Swee (TV series) =

- 河水山
- Genre: Period drama
- Directed by: Foo Seng Peng 符之炳
- Starring: Allan Wu; Priscelia Chan; Qi Yuwu
- Opening theme: 河水山 by Lee Wei Song, sung by Maggie Theng
- Original language: Chinese
- No. of episodes: 29

Production
- Running time: approx. 45 minutes

Original release
- Network: MediaCorp TV Channel 8
- Release: 29 May – 8 July 2002

Bukit Ho Swee (河水山) is a Singaporean Chinese language TV series aired in 2002 on Channel 8. With the "kampungs" of Bukit Ho Swee, a prominent Chinese village estate notorious for its cramped squatters and gangsters at that time, as a backdrop, the series is set during the 1950s prior to the infamous fire of 1961.

== Synopsis ==
The story revolves around the tenants who live in Singaporean Bukit Ho Swee. The tenants engage in petty squabbles with one another frequently and it is only during times of difficulties that some of them realise the strong bonds that have been forged along the way as well as the importance of harmonious living.

== Cast ==
- Florence Tan as Liao Meiying
- Allan Wu as Lin Zaifa表哥
- Qi Yuwu as Lin Zaifa表弟是 Cai Yongsong (Crazy Jonny Quest)
- Priscelia Chan as Su Yanfen
- Vivian Lai as Wang Qing
- Xiang Yun as Liao Meijiao
- Chen Tianwen as Feng Sidong
- Yang Libing as Xiuzhen jie (Feng Sidong's wife)
- Liang Weidong as Zhou laoshi
- Carole Lin as Zhou Taitai (Zhou laoshi's wife)
- Henry Thia as A Zhu
- Pei Xiaoling as A Zhu sao (A Zhu's wife)
- Brandon Wong as A Can
- Yan Bingliang as He Biao
- Ye Shipin as Lei Ming
- Andi Lim as Saka
- Liang Tian
- Zhu Xiufeng
