= Chantalle Ng =

Singaporean actress (born 1995)

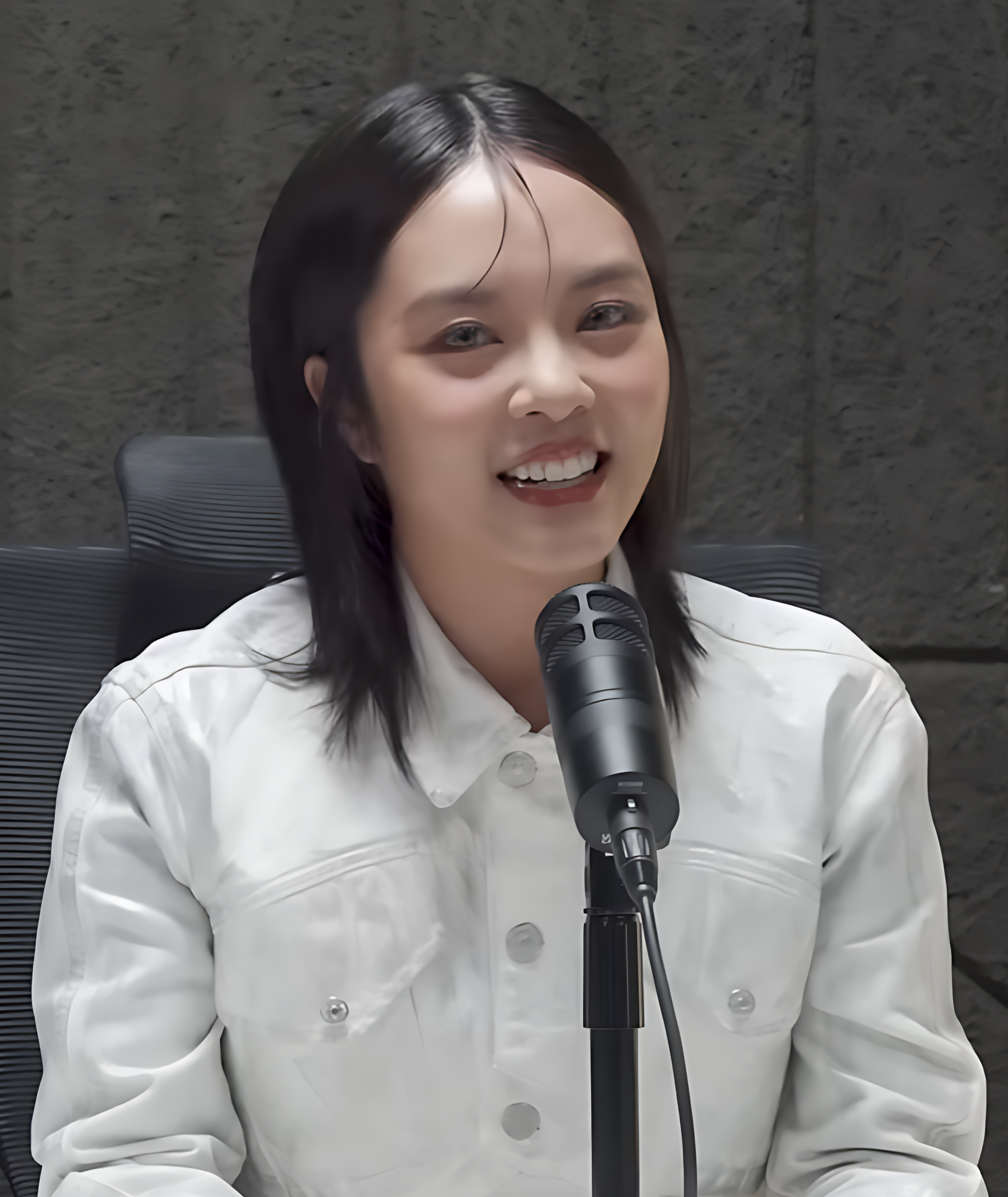
- Ng in 2024
- Born: 17 June 1995 (age 31); Singapore
- Education: Ai Tong School; Presbyterian High School; Nanyang Polytechnic
- Alma mater: Singapore Management University
- Occupations: Actress; businesswoman
- Years active: 2013–present
- Parent(s): Lin Meijiao (mother); Huang Yiliang (father)
- Awards: Full list

Chinese name
- Traditional Chinese: 黃暄婷
- Simplified Chinese: 黄暄婷
- Hanyu Pinyin: Huáng Xuāntíng

Chantalle Ng (born 17 June 1995) is a Singaporean actress.

== Early life and education ==
Ng is the daughter of Mediacorp artiste Lin Meijiao and former actor Huang Yiliang. The couple divorced in 1997 when Ng was only a few months old. Ng studied at Ai Tong School, Presbyterian High School, Nanyang Polytechnic and Singapore Management University (SMU). She graduated from SMU with a Bachelor of Science degree in Information Systems in 2019.

During an interview on talkshow Hear U Out in 2021, Ng was guided by host Quan Yi Fong to talk about her relationship with her father Huang Yiliang during her childhood and youth years. Ng revealed that while she enjoyed playing sports with Huang, an incident with excessive hard canings eventually led to her being hospitalized for a week and it was later a police case. Even though the charges were eventually dropped, Ng cut off contact with him. After the broadcast of the programme, on 26 September 2021, Huang responded to the allegations on Facebook live, claiming that his heart was "ripped to shreds", adding that he doted on her and that Ng should not have revealed these incidents.

== Career ==
Ng signed a contract with Mediacorp in May 2019. Prior to her university and graduation, Ng was already involved in a number of Channel 8 productions, playing supporting roles in 96 °C Café and World At Your Feet.

In 2018, Ng clinched the Star Awards Best Newcomer with her performance in While We Are Young. Her performance propelled her to her first leading role Coco in the Chinese drama The Distance Between which was entirely filmed in Western Australia.

Ng started her own business in 2020 with friend Minying Wong, selling collagen soup under the brand Yuan Collagen.

== Filmography ==
=== Television series ===
Year	Title	Role	Notes	Ref.
2013	96°C Café	Lin Shuting		
2014	Yes We Can!	Liu Cailing		
2014	World at Your Feet	Li Siqiang		
2014	Against the Tide	Judith Tan		
2015	Sealed With A Kiss	Song Weiqiao		
2017	While We Are Young	Huang Li Baiyun		
2018	A Lonely Fish (寂寞鱼·听见)	Kora		
2018	Love At Cavenagh Bridge (加文纳桥的约定)	Li Huiyi		
2018	The Distance Between (下个路口遇见你)	Coco Wang		
2018	Magic Chef (料理人生)	Xuan Yi		
2019	Derek	Stephanie		
2019	Old Is Gold (老友万岁)	Bai Shasha		
2019	Old Is Gold: The Bliss Keeper (老友万岁之守护幸福)	Bai Shasha		
2019	I See You (看见看不见的你)	Sonia		
2020	All Around You (回网路)	Li Xintong		
2020	Terror Within (内颤)	Lin Xiaoyu		
2020	Bittersweet Love (柠檬苦茶)	Qingxuan		
2021	The Heartland Hero	Ling Ke'er		
2021	My Star Bride	Mei Fangcao / Mai Phuong Thao		
2021	Live Your Dreams (大大的梦想)	Fang Jingchen		
2021	Leave No Soul Behind (21点灵)	Xu Cunen		
2022	The Unbreakable Bond (寄生)	Luo Shiyuan		
2022	Love At First Bite (遇见你，真香！)	Chang Xiyue		
2023	All That Glitters	Li Zhenyu		
2024	Kill Sera Sera	Shao Shanqi		
2024	Hope Afloat (浴水重生)	Xu Tianqing		
2025	Emerald Hill - The Little Nyonya Story	Zhang Anna		
2026	The Grind			

=== Film ===
Year	Title	Role	Notes	Ref.
2017	The Fortune Handbook	Albee		
2022	My Star Bride - Hi, Mai Phương Thảo	Mei Fangcao / Mai Phương Thảo	Telemovie	

== Discography ==
=== Compilation albums ===
Year	English title	Mandarin title
2017	While We Are Young Sub-Theme Song	致爱
2019	MediaCorp Music Lunar New Year Album 19	嘻嘻哈哈过新年
2019	Old Is Gold Sub-Theme Song	认真的爱
2020	MediaCorp Music Lunar New Year Album 20	裕鼠鼠纳福迎春乐
2022	MediaCorp Music Lunar New Year Album 22	新传媒群星旺虎泰哥迎春乐
2023	MediaCorp Music Lunar New Year Album 23	新传媒2023贺岁传辑哈皮兔宝福星照

== Awards and nominations ==
Organisation	Year	Category	Nominated work	Result	Ref.
New York Festivals Film & TV Awards	2022	Best Performance by An Actress	My Star Bride	Finalist	
Star Awards	2018	Best Newcomer	While We Are Young	Won	
Star Awards	2021	Best Supporting Actress	Terror Within	Nominated	
Star Awards	2021	Top 10 Most Popular Female Artistes	—N/a	Top 30	
Star Awards	2022	Best Actress	My Star Bride	Nominated	
Star Awards	2022	Favourite Female Show Stealer	My Star Bride	Won	
Star Awards	2022	Favourite CP	My Star Bride	Won	
Star Awards	2022	Favourite CP	Live Your Dreams	Nominated	
Star Awards	2022	Best Theme Song	"是谁" (Live Your Dreams)	Nominated	
Star Awards	2022	Bioskin Most Charismatic Artiste Award	—N/a	Nominated	
Star Awards	2022	Top 10 Most Popular Female Artistes	—N/a	Top 10	
Star Awards	2023	Favourite CP	Love At First Bite	Won	
Star Awards	2023	Top 10 Most Popular Female Artistes	—N/a	Top 10	
Star Awards	2024	Best Actress	All That Glitters	Nominated	
Star Awards	2024	Favourite CP	All That Glitters	Won	
Star Awards	2024	Top 10 Most Popular Female Artistes	—N/a	Top 10	
Star Awards	2025	Best Actress	Hope Afloat	Nominated	
Star Awards	2025	The Show Stealer	Hope Afloat	Nominated	
Star Awards	2025	Favourite CP	Hope Afloat	Won	
Star Awards	2025	Top 10 Most Popular Female Artistes	—N/a	Top 10	
Star Awards	2026	Best Actress	Emerald Hill - The Little Nyonya Story	Nominated	
Star Awards	2026	The Show Stealer	Emerald Hill - The Little Nyonya Story	Nominated	
Star Awards	2026	Most Emotional Performance	Emerald Hill - The Little Nyonya Story	Nominated	
Star Awards	2026	Most Hated Villain	Emerald Hill - The Little Nyonya Story	Won	
Star Awards	2026	Top 10 Most Popular Female Artistes	—N/a	Top 10	
