= Star Awards for Best Actress =

Singaporean media award

Star Awards for Best Actress 最佳女主角
- Awarded for: Best Performance by an Actress in a Leading Role
- Country: Singapore
- Presented by: Mediacorp
- First award: 1995
- Most recent winner: Jesseca Liu – Emerald Hill - The Little Nyonya Story (2026)

Highlights
- Most awards: Huang Biren (5)
- Most nominations: Zoe Tay (15)

The Star Awards for Best Actress is an award presented annually at the Star Awards, a ceremony that was established in 1994.

The category was introduced in 1995, at the 2nd Star Awards ceremony; Fann Wong received the award for her role in Chronicle of Life and it is given in honour of a Mediacorp actress who has delivered an outstanding performance in a leading role. The nominees are determined by a team of judges employed by Mediacorp; winners are selected by a majority vote from the entire judging panel.

Since its inception, the award has been given to 15 actresses. Jesseca Liu is the most recent winner in this category for her role in Emerald Hill - The Little Nyonya Story. Since the ceremony held in 2024, Huang remains as the only actress to win in this category five times, surpassing Zoe Tay who has four wins. Tay has also been nominated on 15 occasions, more than any other actress. Jacelyn Tay is currently the actresses who have the most nominations without a win, with five.

== Winners and nominees ==
| Year | Actress | Work title (role) | Nominees |
|---|---|---|---|
| 1995 | Fann Wong | Chronicle of Life (Fang Ling 方玲) | Chen Liping — Heartbeat (Jiang Tong 江彤); Aileen Tan — The Blazing Trail (Li Shali 李莎莉); Zoe Tay — Love Dowry (Min 敏); Zeng Huifen — A Chance of Life (Lin Aili 林爱莉) |
| 1996 | Zoe Tay | The Golden Pillow (Zhou Xiaodan 周小丹) | Cynthia Koh — Tofu Street (Liang Simei 梁四妹); Aileen Tan — Ace Cops (Yao Jingjing 姚菁菁); Fann Wong — The Unbroken Cycle (Ye Qin 叶琴 / Zhu Zhiyue 朱织月 / Li Xiangmei 李香媚); Zeng Huifen — Dr Justice 2 (Shen Xishuang 沈惜双) |
| 1997 | Carole Lin | The Price of Peace (Wang Qiumei 王秋梅) | Irin Gan — The Choice Partner (Sun Liling 孙丽玲); Aileen Tan — Agong Bak Kut Teh (Yu 阿玉); Zoe Tay — A Different Life (Ou Guikai 欧桂开); Fann Wong — The Matchmaker's Match (Xiang-gu 香姑) |
| 1998 | Huang Biren | Stand by Me (Lin Wenyu 林文玉) | Lina Ng — Living in Geylang (Liu Yinghua 刘英华); Zoe Tay — The New Adventures of Wisely (Bai Su 白素); Fann Wong — The Return of the Condor Heroes (Xiao Longnü 小龙女); Zheng Wanling — Driven by a Car (Yang Jinfeng 杨金凤) |
| 1999 | Cynthia Koh | Stepping Out (Hong Dou 红豆) | Huang Biren — From the Courtroom (Yang Zhanyi 杨展仪); Ivy Lee — Stepping Out (Ju 阿菊); Zoe Tay — Lost Soul (Pianpian 翩翩); Fann Wong — Out to Win (Zhang Wenhua Coco 张文华) |
| 2000 | Ivy Lee | Angel's Dream (Chen Anqi 陈安琪) | Lin Meijiao — Hainan Kopi Tales (Huang Jinmei 黄金梅); Jacelyn Tay — The Legendary Swordsman (Dongfang Bubai 东方不败); Zoe Tay — My Home Affairs (Zhang Xiaotong 张晓彤); Fann Wong — The Legendary Swordsman (Ren Yingying 任盈盈) |
| 2001 | Aileen Tan | Three Women and A Half (Jane) | Chen Liping — Beyond the Axis of Truth (Jiang Meiqi 蒋美琦); Huang Biren — Three Women and A Half (Monica); Zoe Tay — The Stratagem (Ye Kaishuang 叶凯双); Fann Wong — Heroes in Black (Liu Feiyan 柳非雁) |
| 2002 | Huang Biren | Beautiful Connection (Fan Kelian 范可莲) | Chen Liping — No Problem (Bao Jinlian 包金莲); Ivy Lee — The Wing of Desire (Lin Jiaxuan 林家萱); Aileen Tan — Beautiful Connection (Fan Keli 范可荔); Jacelyn Tay — The Wing of Desire (Hu Danchun 胡单纯) |
| 2003 | Chen Liping | Holland V (Mo Wanwan 莫婉婉) | Jeanette Aw — Holland V (Mo Jingjing 莫晶晶); Aileen Tan — Romance de Amour (Kang Li 康莉); Jacelyn Tay — Romance de Amour (Wang Qinghui 王晴晖); Zoe Tay — Baby Boom (Kim) |
| 2004 | Ivy Lee | Double Happiness I (Situ Yaxi 司徒雅喜) | Jeanette Aw — A Child's Hope II (Lin Jinghao 林静濠); Huang Biren — An Ode to Life (Wang Suzhi 汪素枝); Fann Wong — Always on My Mind (Guan Sijia 关斯嘉); Xiang Yun — Double Happiness I (Luo Jiaxi 罗家喜) |
| 2005 | Huang Biren | My Lucky Charm (Lucky) | Cynthia Koh — Portrait of Home (Fu Baozhu 傅宝珠); Yvonne Lim — A New Life (Mei 阿美); Jacelyn Tay — You Are the One (Hao Meili 郝美丽); Fann Wong — Beautiful Illusions (Wang Yixin Joe-ann 王毅芯) |
| 2006 | Ivy Lee | Family Matters (Zhao Shuyang 赵舒扬) | Ann Kok — Love Conceirge (Jiang Ruqing 蒋如情); Jesseca Liu — Rhapsody in Blue (Ding Yirou 丁以柔); Jacelyn Tay — Love Conceirge (Jiang Ruyi 蒋如意); Fann Wong — Women of Times (Wang Xiyi 王曦怡) |
| 2007 | Yvonne Lim | Metamorphosis (Wen Wanrou 温婉柔) | Huang Biren — Mars vs Venus (Xie Wenjing 谢文静); Ivy Lee — House of Joy (Zheng Yihuan 郑一欢); Jesseca Liu — Kinship (Zheng Yusheng 郑玉生); Joanne Peh — Like Father, Like Daughter (Dai Chunchun 戴纯纯) |
| 2009 | Joanne Peh | The Little Nyonya (Huang Yuzhu 黄玉珠) | Jeanette Aw — The Little Nyonya (Huang Juxiang 黄菊香 / Yamamoto Yueniang 山本月娘); Chen Liping — Just in Singapore (Nancy); Chen Liping — The Golden Path (Xiao-gu 笑姑); Felicia Chin — The Golden Path (Lin Fei 林菲); Fann Wong — The Defining Moment (Lin Kexin 林可欣) |
| 2010 | Chen Liping | Reunion Dinner (Ping 阿萍) | Jeanette Aw — Together (Yao Jianhong 姚剑虹); Hong Huifang — Housewives' Holiday (Chen Simei 陈思美); Ann Kok — Housewives' Holiday (Zeng Huixian Alice 曾慧贤); Eelyn Kok — Together (Huang Jinhao 黄金好) |
| 2011 | Rui En | With You (Ye Siqi 叶思琪) | Jeanette Aw — Breakout (Ye Ziqing 叶子青 / Yang Nianqing 杨念青); Chen Liping — Unriddle (Lin Zhengyi 林正仪); Joanne Peh — Your Hand In Mine (Wu Youqing 吴有情); Zhou Ying — Breakout (Tang Ying 汤颖) |
| 2012 | Joanne Peh | A Tale of 2 Cities (Pan Leyao 潘乐瑶) | Ann Kok — Bountiful Blessings (Liang Pinhong 梁品红); Rui En — A Tale of 2 Cities (Zhang Yale 章雅乐); Zoe Tay — Devotion (Liu Zhaodi 刘招娣); Fann Wong — On the Fringe (Liu Jiali 刘佳丽) |
| 2013 | Rui En | Unriddle 2 (Hu Xiaoman 胡小曼) | Cynthia Koh — Show Hand (Wu Meifang 吴美芳); Rebecca Lim — Unriddle 2 (Gao Jieyu 高婕妤); Kym Ng — It Takes Two (Luo Na 罗娜); Joanne Peh — Pillow Talk (Zhang Qiuxue 张秋雪) |
| 2014 | Chen Liping | The Dream Makers (Yao-Zhu Kangli 姚朱康莉) | Jeanette Aw — The Dream Makers (Zhao Fei'er 赵非儿); Rebecca Lim — Sudden (Guo Weiqian 郭玮茜 / Huang Yixin 黄逸欣); Rui En — The Dream Makers (Fang Tonglin 方彤琳); Tong Bing Yu — The Journey: A Voyage (Bai Mingzhu 白明珠) |
| 2015 | Rebecca Lim | Yes We Can! (Zhang Xueqin 张雪芹) | Felicia Chin — The Journey: Tumultuous Times (Zhang Min 张敏); Yvonne Lim — World at Your Feet (Zheng Yongyi 郑永仪); Joanne Peh — C.L.I.F. 3 (Leow Xin Yi 廖心怡); Rui En — Against the Tide (Qiu Xueqing 邱雪清) |
| 2016 | Jeanette Aw | The Dream Makers II (Zhao Fei'er 赵非儿) | Rebecca Lim — Sealed with a Kiss (Du Junning 杜均宁); Rui En — The Dream Makers II (Fang Tonglin 方彤琳); Zoe Tay — The Dream Makers II (Zhou Weiyun 周薇芸); Ya Hui — 118 (Hong Jinzhi 洪金枝) |
| 2017 | Zoe Tay | You Can Be an Angel 2 (Wang Ruojun 王若君) | Jeanette Aw — The Dream Job (Cheng Huishan 程卉杉); Rebecca Lim — You Can Be an Angel 2 (Guan Xinni 关馨霓); Jesseca Liu — Hero (Zhang Weixiong 张伟雄); Rui En — If Only I Could (Chen Zhenhao 陈珍好) |
| 2018 | Rebecca Lim | The Lead (Lin Meizhen 林美真) | Chen Liping — Mightiest Mother-in-Law (Liew Xiuzhu 吕秀珠); Paige Chua — Mightiest Mother-in-Law (Guan Shuhui 管淑慧); Zoe Tay 郑惠玉 — While We Are Young (Fang Ting 方廷); Carrie Wong — My Friends from Afar (Chen Fengjiao 陈凤娇) |
| 2019 | Zoe Tay | A Million Dollar Dream (Hu Jiaofen 胡娇芬) | Rebecca Lim — Blessings II (Chen Chunxian 陈春仙 / Zhou Meiyue 周美月); Joanne Peh — Say Cheese (Pan Zejia 潘泽家); Carrie Wong — VIC (Zhan Yurou Vicky 詹予柔); Fann Wong — Doppelganger (Wang Siting 王思婷) |
| 2021 | Zoe Tay | My Guardian Angels (Mandy See 施若芸) | Chen Liping — How Are You? (Dai Anna 戴安娜 / Guo Meili 郭美莉); Felicia Chin — A Jungle Survivor (Cheng Yali Olivia 程雅莉); Rebecca Lim — A Jungle Survivor (Tang Ruoqi 唐若琪); Kym Ng — My Guardian Angels (Wu Miaomiao 吴淼淼); Rui En — Hello From the Other Side (Ma Ruyin 马如荫); Carrie Wong — A Quest to Heal (Luo Mingyi 罗明依) |
| 2022 | Huang Biren | Recipe of Life (Chen Huiying 陈惠瑛) | Jesseca Liu — Crouching Tiger Hidden Ghost (Lin Xiaofang 林小芳); Chantalle Ng — My Star Bride (Mai Phương Thảo 梅芳草); Joanne Peh — Mind Jumper (Khoo Kaile 邱凯乐); Ya Hui — CTRL (Liang Siyun 梁思韵) |
| 2023 | Huang Biren | Your World in Mine (Li Jiayun 李家云) | Hong Ling — Your World in Mine (Zheng Tianxi 郑天希); Rebecca Lim — Soul Doctor (Ling Jingyao 凌婧瑶); Jesseca Liu — Soul Detective (Liu Shuqin 刘淑琴); Zoe Tay — Dark Angel (He Ziyuan 何紫媛) |
| 2024 | Kym Ng | Till the End (Yang Kehua 杨可华) | Chantalle Ng — All That Glitters (Li Zhenyu 李珍玉); Jernelle Oh — Cash on Delivery (Huang Meizhen 黄美真); Joanne Peh — SHERO (Zhang Yinchen 张尹晨); Rui En — Oppa, Saranghae!！ (Ouyang Qiqi 欧阳琦琦) |
| 2025 | Jessica Hsuan | Kill Sera Sera (Shao Ruoyun 邵若云) | Chantalle Ng — Hope Afloat (Xu Tianqing 许天晴); Felicia Chin — I Do, Do I? (Yumi 涂悠米); Hong Ling — Unforgivable (Guan Lin 关霖); Jesseca Liu — Unforgivable (Gao Shuya 高舒亚) |
| 2026 | Jesseca Liu | Emerald Hill - The Little Nyonya Story (Li Shu Qin 李淑琴) | Chantalle Ng - Emerald Hill - The Little Nyonya Story (Zhang Anna 张安娜); Cheryl Chou - Perfectly Imperfect (Fan Xiaowen / When Zhou Yingying 范晓雯 / When 周赢赢); Hong Ling - The Spirit Hunter (Tian Na Na 田娜娜); Tasha Low - Emerald Hill - The Little Nyonya Story (Zhang Xinniang 张心娘) |

== Nominees distribution chart ==
Colour key
| Actress won the award |
| Actress was nominated for the award |
| Actress was not nominated for the award |
| Actress is currently nominated for the award |

| Actress | Year | | | | | | | | | | | | | | | | | | | | | | | | | | | | | | Wins | Noms |
| Actress | 1995 | 1996 | 1997 | 1998 | 1999 | 2000 | 2001 | 2002 | 2003 | 2004 | 2005 | 2006 | 2007 | 2009 | 2010 | 2011 | 2012 | 2013 | 2014 | 2015 | 2016 | 2017 | 2018 | 2019 | 2021 | 2022 | 2023 | 2024 | 2025 | 2026 | Wins | Noms |
|---|---|---|---|---|---|---|---|---|---|---|---|---|---|---|---|---|---|---|---|---|---|---|---|---|---|---|---|---|---|---|---|---|
| Huang Biren | | | | 1 | N | | N | 2 | | N | 3 | | N | | | | | | | | | | | | | 4 | 5 | | | | 5 | 9 |
| Zoe Tay | N | 1 | N | N | N | N | N | | N | | | | | | | | N | | | | N | 2 | N | 3 | 4 | | N | | | | 4 | 15 |
| Ivy Lee | | | | | N | 1 | | N | | 2 | | 3 | N | | | | | | | | | | | | | | | | | | 3 | 6 |
| Chen Liping | N | | | | | | N | N | 1 | | | | | N | 2 | N | | | 3 | | | | N | | N | | | | | | 3 | 11 |
| Joanne Peh | | | | | | | | | | | | | N | 1 | | N | 2 | N | | N | | | | N | | N | | N | | | 2 | 9 |
| Rui En | | | | | | | | | | | | | | | | 1 | N | 2 | N | N | N | N | | | N | | | N | | | 2 | 9 |
| Rebecca Lim | | | | | | | | | | | | | | | | | | N | N | 1 | N | N | 2 | N | N | | N | | | | 2 | 9 |
| Fann Wong | 1 | N | N | N | N | N | N | | | N | N | N | | N | | | N | | | | | | | N | | | | | | | 1 | 13 |
| Carole Lin | | | 1 | | | | | | | | | | | | | | | | | | | | | | | | | | | | 1 | 1 |
| Cynthia Koh | | N | | | 1 | | | | | | N | | | | | | | N | | | | | | | | | | | | | 1 | 4 |
| Aileen Tan | N | N | N | | | | 1 | N | N | | | | | | | | | | | | | | | | | | | | | | 1 | 6 |
| Yvonne Lim | | | | | | | | | | | N | | 1 | | | | | | | N | | | | | | | | | | | 1 | 3 |
| Jeanette Aw | | | | | | | | | N | N | | | | N | N | N | | | N | | 1 | N | | | | | | | | | 1 | 8 |
| Kym Ng | | | | | | | | | | | | | | | | | | N | | | | | | | N | | | 1 | | | 1 | 3 |
| Jessica Hsuan | | | | | | | | | | | | | | | | | | | | | | | | | | | | | 1 | | 1 | 1 |
| Jesseca Liu | | | | | | | | | | | | N | N | | | | | | | | | N | | | | N | N | | N | 1 | 1 | 7 |
| Jacelyn Tay | | | | | | N | | N | N | | N | N | | | | | | | | | | | | | | | | | | | 0 | 5 |
| Felicia Chin | | | | | | | | | | | | | | N | | | | | | N | | | | | N | | | | N | | 0 | 4 |
| Chantalle Ng | | | | | | | | | | | | | | | | | | | | | | | | | | N | | N | N | N | 0 | 4 |
| Ann Kok | | | | | | | | | | | | N | | | N | | N | | | | | | | | | | | | | | 0 | 3 |
| Carrie Wong | | | | | | | | | | | | | | | | | | | | | | | N | N | N | | | | | | 0 | 3 |
| Hong Ling | | | | | | | | | | | | | | | | | | | | | | | | | | | N | | N | N | 0 | 3 |
| Zeng Huifen | N | N | | | | | | | | | | | | | | | | | | | | | | | | | | | | | 0 | 2 |
| Ya Hui | | | | | | | | | | | | | | | | | | | | | N | | | | | N | | | | | 0 | 2 |
| Irin Gan | | | N | | | | | | | | | | | | | | | | | | | | | | | | | | | | 0 | 1 |
| Lina Ng | | | | N | | | | | | | | | | | | | | | | | | | | | | | | | | | 0 | 1 |
| Zheng Wanling | | | | N | | | | | | | | | | | | | | | | | | | | | | | | | | | 0 | 1 |
| Lin Meijiao | | | | | | N | | | | | | | | | | | | | | | | | | | | | | | | | 0 | 1 |
| Xiang Yun | | | | | | | | | | N | | | | | | | | | | | | | | | | | | | | | 0 | 1 |
| Hong Huifang | | | | | | | | | | | | | | | N | | | | | | | | | | | | | | | | 0 | 1 |
| Eelyn Kok | | | | | | | | | | | | | | | N | | | | | | | | | | | | | | | | 0 | 1 |
| Zhou Ying | | | | | | | | | | | | | | | | N | | | | | | | | | | | | | | | 0 | 1 |
| Tong Bing Yu | | | | | | | | | | | | | | | | | | | N | | | | | | | | | | | | 0 | 1 |
| Paige Chua | | | | | | | | | | | | | | | | | | | | | | | N | | | | | | | | 0 | 1 |
| Jernelle Oh | | | | | | | | | | | | | | | | | | | | | | | | | | | | N | | | 0 | 1 |
| Cheryl Chou | | | | | | | | | | | | | | | | | | | | | | | | | | | | | | N | 0 | 1 |
| Tasha Low | | | | | | | | | | | | | | | | | | | | | | | | | | | | | | N | 0 | 1 |

== Award records ==
| Record | Actress | Count | Remarks |
|---|---|---|---|
| Most wins | Huang Biren | 5 wins | 1998, 2002, 2005, 2022, 2023 |
| Most nominations | Zoe Tay | 15 nominations | 1995, 1996, 1997, 1998, 1999, 2000, 2001, 2003, 2012, 2016, 2017, 2018, 2019, 2021, 2023 |
| Longest gap between wins | Zoe Tay | 21 years | 1996—2017 |
| Shortest gap between wins (consecutive wins) | Zoe Tay | 1 year | 2019—2021 |
| Shortest gap between wins (consecutive wins) | Huang Biren | 1 year | 2022—2023 |
| Most nominations before first award | Jeanette Aw | 6 nominations | Won first award (7th nomination) in 2016 |
| Most nominations before first award | Jesseca Liu | 6 nominations | Won first award (7th nomination) in 2026 |
| Most nominations without a win | Jacelyn Tay | 5 nominations | 2000, 2002, 2003, 2005, 2006 |
| Longest gap between nominations | Huang Biren | 15 Years | 2007—2022 |
| Most consecutive nominations | Rebecca Lim | 8 nominations | 2013, 2014, 2015, 2016, 2017, 2018, 2019, 2021 |
| Won at first nomination | Fann Wong | 5 actresses | 1995 |
| Won at first nomination | Carole Lin | 5 actresses | 1997 |
| Won at first nomination | Huang Biren | 5 actresses | 1998 |
| Won at first nomination | Rui En | 5 actresses | 2011 |
| Won at first nomination | Jessica Hsuan | 5 actresses | 2025 |
| Multiple nominations in the same year | Chen Liping | 2 nominations | 2009 |
| Won Best Actress and Best Supporting Actress | Yvonne Lim | 7 actresses | 2007 (Best Actress); 2005 (Best Supporting Actress) |
| Won Best Actress and Best Supporting Actress | Joanne Peh | 7 actresses | 2009, 2012 (Best Actress); 2015 (Best Supporting Actress) |
| Won Best Actress and Best Supporting Actress | Rebecca Lim | 7 actresses | 2015, 2018 (Best Actress); 2014 (Best Supporting Actress) |
| Won Best Actress and Best Supporting Actress | Aileen Tan | 7 actresses | 2001 (Best Actress); 2017, 2024 (Best Supporting Actress) |
| Won Best Actress and Best Supporting Actress | Kym Ng | 7 actresses | 2024 (Best Actress); 2018, 2021 (Best Supporting Actress) |
| Won Best Actress and Best Supporting Actress | Cynthia Koh | 7 actresses | 1999 (Best Actress); 2025 (Best Supporting Actress) |
| Won Best Actress and Best Supporting Actress | Chen Liping | 7 actresses | 2003, 2010, 2014 (Best Actress); 2026 (Best Supporting Actress) |
| Nominated for Best Supporting Actress and Best Actress in the same year | Zeng Huifen | 6 actresses | 1996 |
| Nominated for Best Supporting Actress and Best Actress in the same year | Yvonne Lim | 6 actresses | 2005 |
| Nominated for Best Supporting Actress and Best Actress in the same year | Hong Huifang | 6 actresses | 2010 |
| Nominated for Best Supporting Actress and Best Actress in the same year | Rebecca Lim | 6 actresses | 2014 |
| Nominated for Best Supporting Actress and Best Actress in the same year | Joanne Peh | 6 actresses | 2015 |
| Nominated for Best Supporting Actress and Best Actress in the same year | Kym Ng | 6 actresses | 2021 |
| Won Best Newcomer/Rising Star and Best Actress | Fann Wong | 5 actresses | 1995 (Best Newcomer); 1995 (Best Actress) |
| Won Best Newcomer/Rising Star and Best Actress | Ivy Lee | 5 actresses | 1994 (Best Newcomer); 2000, 2004, 2006 (Best Actress) |
| Won Best Newcomer/Rising Star and Best Actress | Joanne Peh | 5 actresses | 2004 (Best Newcomer); 2009, 2012 (Best Actress) |
| Won Best Newcomer/Rising Star and Best Actress | Jeanette Aw | 5 actresses | 2002 (Best Newcomer); 2016 (Best Actress) |
| Won Best Newcomer/Rising Star and Best Actress | Jesseca Liu | 5 actresses | 2005 (Best Newcomer); 2026 (Best Actress) |
| Nominated for Best Newcomer/Rising Star and Best Actress in the same year | Fann Wong | 2 actresses | 1995 |
| Nominated for Best Newcomer/Rising Star and Best Actress in the same year | Irin Gan | 2 actresses | 1997 |

== Multiple awards and nominations ==
The following individuals won two or more Best Actress awards:

| Wins | Actress | Nominations | Years won |
|---|---|---|---|
| 5 | Huang Biren | 9 | 1998, 2002, 2005, 2022, 2023 |
| 4 | Zoe Tay | 15 | 1996, 2017, 2019, 2021 |
| 3 | Ivy Lee | 6 | 2000, 2004, 2006 |
| 3 | Chen Liping | 11 | 2003, 2010, 2014 |
| 2 | Joanne Peh | 9 | 2009, 2012 |
| 2 | Rui En | 9 | 2011, 2013 |
| 2 | Rebecca Lim | 9 | 2015, 2018 |

The following individuals received two or more Best Actress nominations:

| Nominations | Actress |
|---|---|
| 15 | Zoe Tay |
| 13 | Fann Wong |
| 11 | Chen Liping |
| 9 | Huang Biren |
| 9 | Joanne Peh |
| 9 | Rui En |
| 9 | Rebecca Lim |
| 8 | Jeanette Aw |
| 7 | Jesseca Liu |
| 6 | Aileen Tan |
| 6 | Ivy Lee |
| 5 | Jacelyn Tay |
| 4 | Cynthia Koh |
| 4 | Felicia Chin |
| 4 | Chantalle Ng |
| 3 | Ann Kok |
| 3 | Yvonne Lim |
| 3 | Kym Ng |
| 3 | Carrie Wong |
| 3 | Hong Ling |
| 2 | Zeng Huifen |
| 2 | Ya Hui |
