= Florence Tan =

Malaysian actress and television host (born 1977)

- Born: 30 June 1977 (age 49); Malaysia
- Occupations: Actress; television host
- Years active: 1997−present
- Agents: MediaCorp (1997–2006); Lafeng Entertainment (2011–present); FLY Entertainment (2017-present)
- Spouse: Jack Liu (m. 2006)
- Children: 2
- Awards: Star Search 1997: Female Champion

Chinese name
- Traditional Chinese: 陳秀麗
- Simplified Chinese: 陈秀丽
- Hanyu Pinyin: Chén Xiùlì
- Jyutping: Can4 Sau3 Lai6
- Tâi-lô: Tân Siù-lê

Florence Tan Siew Lee (born 30 June 1977) is a Malaysian actress and host who is based in Singapore and Hong Kong. She was a full-time Mediacorp artist from 1997 to 2006, and she continues to take on filming projects. In 2006, she left Mediacorp to expand her career in China and other parts of Asia.

== Career ==
In 1997, Tan participated in Television Corporation of Singapore's talent show Star Search. She won the gender category as well as Miss Photogenic. Among the prizes, she was offered an acting contract, which she accepted.

Tan made her debut in Immortal Love, acting alongside veterans like Chew Chor Meng, Pan Lingling, and Xiang Yun. In 1998, she was cast in the wuxia drama series The Return of the Condor Heroes and went on to appear in several period drama series, including The Legendary Swordsman and The Heaven Sword and Dragon Saber. Her final series with Mediacorp was Zero to Hero, in 2005.

In 2006, after getting married, Tan decided to leave the Singapore television industry and subsequently proceeded to launch her career in China in 2011 after signing with Lafeng Entertainment. Her performance as a scheming concubine in the drama Mystery in the Palace (深宫諜影) received positive reviews.

Tan later returned to Singapore and made a cameo appearance in the 2012 Mediacorp anniversary series Joys of Life. She has since worked in film and television in China and other parts of Asia. In 2019, she co-starred in a WeMovie alongside the semi-finalists of the 2019 Star Search competition.

== Personal life ==
Tan married Taiwanese businessman Jack Liu in 2006. The couple has twin daughters, who were born in 2008. As of 2023, Tan and her family are based in Hong Kong.

== Filmography ==
=== Television series ===
Year	Title	Role	Ref.
1997	Immortal Love	Lu Wenyan / Qiu Wenfeng / Fang Jiawen	
1998	The Return of the Condor Heroes	Guo Fu	
1998	Living in Geylang 芽笼, 芽笼	Wang Bizhu	
1999	God of Fortune 财星高照	Lishi Xianguan	
1999	Wok of Life	Ma Daixiang / Magaret Ma (1960s)	
2000	The Legendary Swordsman	Lan Fenghuang	
2000	On The Frontline 穿梭生死线	Ye Qing	
2000	Hainan Kopi Tales	Wu Lifeng	
2001	My Genie 我爱精灵	Fei Fei	
2001	The Invincible Squad	Sun Jiawen/Diana	
2002	The Hotel	Chen Yunli	
2002	Bukit Ho Swee	Liao Meiying	
2002	My Genie II 我爱精灵 II	Cheng Feifei / Pan Jinlian	
2003	The Heaven Sword and Dragon Saber	Xiao Zhao	
2003	A Child's Hope	Fan Danmei	
2005	The Prince of Qin, Li Shimin	Zhangsun Long'er	
2005	The Dragon Heroes 赤子乘龙	Wang Mingzhu	
2005	Zero to Hero	Dolly Leow	
2006	The Little Fairy 天外飞仙	Cuiniang	
2006	The Mischievous Princess 刁蛮公主	Wen Mei'er	
2006	Concubines of the Qing Emperor 大清后宫之还君明珠	Fucha Lanxuan	
2008	The Last Princess 最后的格格	Hua Yuerong	
2012	Joys of Life	Liu Jialing	
2012	Mystery in the Palace 深宫谍影		
2013	Tian Tian Happy 天天有喜		
2013	Women of the Tang Dynasty 唐宫燕	Shangguan Wan'er	
2013	The Demi-Gods and Semi-Devils 天龙八部	Gan Baobao	
2014	New Buddha 新济公活佛		
2014	Xian Xia Jian 仙侠剑		
2014	Woman Tear 女人的眼泪		
2016	Tian Tian Happy II 天天有喜 II		
2018	A Step into the Past	Zhao Ya	
2018	Mind Matters	Zhou Riqing	
2020	Zhaoge (朝歌)		

=== Variety show hosting ===
Year	Title	Notes	Ref.
2001	Travel Hunt 奇趣搜搜搜	Host (to Cambodia, Korea, China, New Zealand, Australia, Switzerland, London)	
2001−2002	One Fun Day 惊喜一整天	Host (to Hong Kong, Shanghai, Hangzhou, China, and New Zealand)	
2002	Lunar New Year Eve Variety Special 骏马奔腾迎新春	Host	
2002	Shoppers Guide 周末大热卖	Host	
2002	One Fun Day II 惊喜一整天 II	Host (to Taiwan and Henan, China)	
2002−2003	Chinese New Year Celebrations 新加坡春节晚会	Host	
2003	Lunar New Year Eve Special 三羊开泰迎丰年	Host	
2003	New Era in Food 饮食新时代	Host	
2003	Shoppers Guide II 周末大热卖 II	Host	
2006	Insiders' Australia 动感澳游	Host	
2007	Star Search	Host	

=== Film ===
Year	Title	Role	Ref.
2015	Jigong Zhi Ren Huang Ding (济公之人皇鼎)	Niu Damei	

== Discography ==
=== Compilation albums (Singapore) ===
Year	Album title	Type
1999	Wok of Life soundtrack CD 福满人间原声碟	CD
2001	Celebrate the establishment of Mediacorp Music Wonderful MTV 庆贺新传媒音乐成立 精彩MTV	VCD
2003	Mediacorp Stars Celebrating the Year of the Goat VCD 新传媒群星贺岁庆羊年	VCD
2003	Mediacorp Stars Celebrating New Year's Eve CD 新传媒群星贺岁庆丰年	CD
2004	Flowers Blooming and Wealth and Welcoming the New Year New Year's Eve Album – Mediacorp Artist 花开富贵迎新春 岁贺专辑 – 新传媒艺人	VCD
2005	Mediacorp Artist – Happy New Year Greetings New Year's Eve Album 新传媒艺人 – 迎春接福喜临门 岁贺专辑	VCD
2005	Mediacorp Chinese New Year Album 新传媒迎春接福喜临门	CD

=== Compilation albums (Taiwan) ===
Year	Album title	Type
2006	The Little Fairy Original Soundtrack 天外飛仙電視原聲帶	VCD
2006	The Little Fairy Original Soundtrack 天外飛仙電視原聲帶	CD

== Awards and nominations ==
Organisation	Year	Category	Nominated work	Result	Ref
Star Awards	1998	Best Newcomer	Immortal Love (as Lu Wenyan/Qiu Wenfeng/Fang Jiawen)	Nominated	
Star Awards	1999	Best Supporting Actress	Wok of Life (as Ma Daixiang/Magaret Ma)	Nominated	
Star Awards	2000	Best Supporting Actress	The Legendary Swordsman (as Lan Fenghuang)	Nominated	
Star Awards	2000	Malaysia's Favourite Female Artiste 马来西亚最受欢迎女艺人	—N/a	Nominated	
Star Awards	2000	Top 10 Most Popular Female Artistes	—N/a	Nominated	
Star Awards	2001	Best Supporting Actress	The Invincible Squad (as Sun Jiawen/Diana)	Nominated	
Star Awards	2001	Top 10 Most Popular Female Artistes		Nominated	
Star Awards	2001	Malaysia's Favourite Female Artiste 马来西亚最受欢迎女艺人		Nominated	
Star Awards	2002	Malaysia's Favourite Female Artiste 马来西亚最受欢迎女艺人	Bukit Ho Swee (as Liao Meiying)	Nominated	
Star Awards	2003	Top 10 Most Popular Female Artistes	—N/a	Nominated	
Mediacorp Studios	2004	Standard lover 标准情人	—N/a	Won	
Mediacorp Studios	2004	Mediacorp's third sister 新传媒三姐	—N/a	Won	
Singapore Zaobao newspaper	2004	Asia Top 50 Most Popular Artiste 亚洲人气偶像50强	—N/a	Nominated	
FHM Singapore	2005	Men help FHM's Top 100 Most Sexy Woman List in the World 男人帮FHM全球百大性感美女榜	—N/a	Won at No.1 in Top 100	
Mediacorp Studios	2005	Best lover 最佳情人	—N/a	Won	
