= Pillow Talk (Singaporean TV series) =

Singaporean TV series

- 再见单人床
- Genre: Family; Romance
- Written by: Rebecca Leow 洪汐
- Directed by: Foo Seng Peng 符之柄; Jasmine Woo 邬毓琳; Lin Mingzhe 林明哲
- Starring: Joanne Peh; Pierre Png; Thomas Ong; Michelle Chia; Jacelyn Tay
- Opening theme: 伴 by Tiger Huang
- Ending theme: 误点 by Tiger Huang
- Country of origin: Singapore
- Original language: Chinese
- No. of episodes: 21

Production
- Producer: Chong Liung Man 张龙敏
- Running time: approx. 45 minutes

Original release
- Network: MediaCorp Channel 8
- Release: 2 April – 30 April 2012

Related
- Unriddle 2; Absolutely Charming; Mars vs Venus

Pillow Talk (Chinese: 再见单人床) is a Singaporean Chinese drama which will be telecast on Singapore's free-to-air channel, MediaCorp Channel 8. It stars Joanne Peh, Pierre Png, Thomas Ong, Michelle Chia and Jacelyn Tay.

== Production ==
Mars vs Venus's Chinese name is 幸福双人床 (literally Lucky Double Bed), whereas this drama's is 再见单人床, which translates to "Seeing the Single Bed again". 再见单人床 can also be interpreted as saying goodbye to the single bed, implying one is going to get married.

This drama was planned to have 20 episodes, but added an episode due to overruns in filming.

== Cast ==
Cast	Role	Description
Joanne Peh 白薇秀	Zhang Qiuxue 张秋雪	Beauty salesgirl; He Tingkai's wife; Zhang Qian and Mao Yunling's daughter; Zhang Qiuyu's younger sister
Thomas Ong 王沺裁	Zhang Qiuyu 张秋雨	Banker; Liang Chuning's husband; Zhang Qiuxue's brother; Xiaoyun's father
Zhu Houren 朱厚任	Zhang Qian 张谦	Ex-actor; Mao Yunling's husband; Zhang Qiuyu and Zhang Qiuxue's father
Xiang Yun 向云	Mao Yunling 毛蕴玲	Zhang Qian's wife; Zhang Qiuyu and Zhang Qiuxue's mother
Pierre Png 方展发	He Tingkai 何廷凯	Zhang Qiuxue's husband; He Guangming and Lu Peifen's son
Chen Shucheng 陈澍城	He Guangming 何光明	Taxi driver; Lu Peifen's husband; He Tingkai's foster father
Hong Huifang 洪慧芳	Lu Peifen 卢佩芬	He Guangming's wife; He Tingkai's foster mother
Michelle Chia 谢韵仪	Liang Chuning 梁楚宁	Ex-accountant; Housewife; Zhang Qiuyu's wife; Xiaoyun's mother
Cai Rouying 蔡揉颖	Zhang Xiaoyun 张小云	Zhang Qiuyu's & Liang Chuning's Daughter; Zhang Qian's & Mao Yunling's Granddaughter
Jacelyn Tay 郑秀珍	Alice	Lawyer; Zhang Qiuyu's mistress

== Episodes ==
Episode	Title	Original airdate	Repeat telecast
1	"1"	April 2, 2012 PG	May 15, 2013 PG
2	"2"	April 3, 2012 PG	May 16, 2013 PG
3	"3"	April 4, 2012 PG	May 17, 2013 PG
4	"4"	April 5, 2012 PG	May 20, 2013 PG
5	"5"	April 6, 2012 PG	May 21, 2013 PG
6	"6"	April 9, 2012 PG	May 22, 2013 PG
7	"7"	April 10, 2012 PG	May 23, 2013 PG
8	"8"	April 11, 2012 PG	May 24, 2013 PG
Trivia: This episode had the sentence "A miracle!" said three to four times.
9	"9"	April 12, 2012 PG	May 27, 2013 PG
10	"10"	April 13, 2012 PG	May 28, 2013 PG
11	"11"	April 16, 2012 PG	May 29, 2013 PG
12	"12"	April 17, 2012 PG	May 30, 2013 PG
13	"13"	April 18, 2012 PG	May 31, 2013 PG
14	"14"	April 19, 2012 PG	June 3, 2013 PG
15	"15"	April 20, 2012 PG	June 4, 2013 PG
16	"16"	April 23, 2012 PG	June 5, 2013 PG
17	"17"	April 24, 2012 PG	June 6, 2013 PG
18	"18"	April 25, 2012 PG	June 7, 2013 PG
19	"19"	April 26, 2012 PG	June 10, 2013 PG
20	"20"	April 27, 2012 PG	June 11, 2013; PG Some Violence
21	"21 (Fin.)"	April 30, 2012 PG	June 12, 2013 PG

== Overseas broadcast ==
Country of Broadcast	Broadcasting Network	Debut	Finale
Malaysia	Astro Shuang Xing	11 August 2012 at 5.30pm, weekends	15 September 2012

== Accolades ==
Organisation	Year	Category	Nominee(s)	Result	Ref
Star Awards	2013	Best Screenplay	Rebecca Leow	Nominated	
Star Awards	2013	Best Drama Cameraman	Steve Wong Kwok Chung	Nominated	
Star Awards	2013	Best Costume and Image Design	Xu Ying Ying	Nominated	
Star Awards	2013	Best Actress	Joanne Peh	Nominated	
Star Awards	2013	Best Actor	Pierre Png	Nominated	
Star Awards	2013	Best Actor	Thomas Ong	Nominated	
Star Awards	2013	Best Supporting Actor	Zhu Houren	Nominated	
Star Awards	2013	Best Supporting Actress	Xiang Yun	Nominated	
Star Awards	2013	Best Drama Serial		Won	
Star Awards	2013	Top Rated Drama Serial 2012		Nominated	

== See also ==
- List of programmes broadcast by Mediacorp Channel 8
- List of Pillow Talk (TV series) episodes

Preceded by On the Fringe; 2011–12	Star Awards for Best Drama Serial; Pillow Talk; 2012–13	Succeeded by The Dream Makers (season 1); 2013–14
