= You Are the One (Singaporean TV series) =

- Starring: Adia Chan; Chew Chor Meng; Jacelyn Tay; Christopher Lee; Rui En; Terence Cao; Richard Low
- Country of origin: Singapore
- Original language: Mandarin
- No. of episodes: 25

Original release
- Network: MediaCorp TV Channel 8
- Release: 14 February – 18 March 2005

You Are The One (½缘分) is a 25 episode Singaporean Chinese drama series aired on MediaCorp TV Channel 8. The show stars Hong Kong actress Adia Chan, Chew Chor Meng, Jacelyn Tay, Christopher Lee, Rui En, Terence Cao and Richard Low.

== Plot ==
The drama is about 3 daughters and their father. Hao Meili is the second sister and the ugliest and wishes to find a boyfriend, Yukiko Hao Meide is the youngest and is the prettiest. She has plenty of suitors but won't settle down. Hao Meiman is the eldest. She is a career-minded woman and has an arch rival, Raymond See. In the end, Hao Meiman married Raymond See and was pregnant when Hao Meili married Simon See and Hao Meide married An Zhengxi.

== Cast ==
- Adia Chan as Hao Meiman
- Jacelyn Tay as Hao Meili
- Rui En as Yukiko Hao Meide
- Richard Low as Hao Shunli
- Chew Chor Meng as Raymond See
- Christopher Lee as Simon See
- Terence Cao as An Zhengxi
- Zhang Xinxiang

== Accolades ==
Award	Category	Nominee	Result	Ref
Star Awards	Best Actress	Jacelyn Tay	Nominated	
Star Awards	Best Drama Serial	—N/a	Nominated	
