= Are You My Brother? =

1999 Singaporean TV series

- 错体双宝
- Genre: Drama
- Original language: Chinese
- No. of seasons: 1
- No. of episodes: 20

Production
- Running time: 46–47 minutes

Are You My Brother? (Chinese: 错体双宝) is a Singaporean TV series produced by MediaCorp in 1999.

== Main cast ==
- Tay Ping Hui
- Thomas Ong
- Huang Biren
- Pan Lingling
- Yvonne Lim
- Jacelyn Tay

== Synopsis ==
Chang Lee sells chicken at a wet market, and found out during a blood test for a bone marrow donation that he and a man named Dong Cheng are brothers. Dong Cheng, who only wanted to donate bone marrow as a way to seal the deal on a contract, had a hard time to accept his biological family works at a wet market for a living.
