= Game Plan (TV series) =

2012 Singaporean Chinese drama series

- Also known as: Tricked 中计
- 千方百计
- Genre: Mystery; Thriller
- Written by: Ho Hee Ann 何启安
- Directed by: Canter Chia 谢光华
- Starring: Christopher Lee; Jesseca Liu; Shaun Chen; Jacelyn Tay; Chen Shucheng; Lin Meijiao; Tong Bing Yu
- Opening theme: Wake Up by Anthony Neely
- Ending theme: 魔鬼中的天使 by Hebe Tian 关键字 by Nick Yeo 你能夠 by Nick Yeo
- Country of origin: Singapore
- Original language: Chinese
- No. of series: 1
- No. of episodes: 20

Production
- Producer: Molby Low 刘健财
- Running time: approx. 45 minutes
- Production company: Wawa Pictures

Original release
- Network: MediaCorp Channel 8
- Release: 9 October – 5 November 2012

Related
- Poetic Justice; It Takes Two

Game Plan
- Traditional Chinese: 千方百計
- Simplified Chinese: 千方百计
Transcriptions
Standard Mandarin
- Hanyu Pinyin: Qiān Fāng Bǎi Jì

Game Plan (千方百计) is a Singaporean Chinese drama which debuted on 9 October 2012. This series was the second production by Wawa Pictures to be broadcast on MediaCorp Channel 8, the last series being "The Oath". It stars Christopher Lee, Jesseca Liu, Shaun Chen, Jacelyn Tay, Chen Shucheng, Lin Meijiao & Tong Bing Yu as the casts of the series.

== Synopsis ==
On her wedding day, Zhao Xintong (Jesseca Liu) learns that her fiancé, Adam, is actually a scammer and has stolen a large sum of money. Desperate, she goes to Zhen Haoren (Christopher Lee), a scammer who just got out of jail, hoping to get her money back.

Little by little she falls in love with him, but things are more complicated than they seem.

== Cast ==
Cast	Role	Description
Christopher Lee 李铭顺	Zeng Hao Ren 曾浩仁	A kind-hearted professional con artist who leads a con group
Jesseca Liu 刘子绚	Zhao Xin Tong 赵欣彤	Deceived by Adam. Seek help from Hao Ren
Jacelyn Tay 郑秀珍	Mo Yan 莫言	Main Villain; A professional con-artist who conned an organisation leader's daughter and subsequently took over the organisation as its leader. Likes Hao Ren
Shaun Chen 陈泓宇	Chen Jun Wei 陈骏纬	Police officer Detests Hao Ren
Zen Chong 章证翔	Li Zi Guang 李子光	A con artist in the organisation who uses magician skills Loves Mo Yan and detests Hao Ren
Tong Bing Yu 童冰玉	Guo Ke Li 郭可丽	A con artist in the organisation.
Chen Shucheng 陈澍城	Pu Cheng Cai 卜成材	A con artist in Hao Ren's group Likes Shi Yun
Lin Meijiao 林梅嬌	Zhang Shi Yun 张诗云	A con artist in Hao Ren's group Likes Cheng Cai
Tang Lingyi 汤灵伊	Peng Jieqi 彭杰奇	Professional and talented hacker in Hao Ren's group Adopted by Hao Ren as a sibling
Darren Lim 林明伦	Adam Su	Xin Tong's Ex-groom; Amateur con artist
Ye Shipin	Uncle Jian 坚叔	Police officer Hao Ren's confidant Maligned and suspected as a mole in the police force
Zhang Xinxiang	Peter	Drug dealer
Lina Ng 黄嫊方	Zhao Xin Yi 赵欣仪	Xin Tong's sister.
Chen Guohua 陈国华	Cheng Kun 承琨	Hao Ren's benefactor Ex-con artist Drug dealer, foot massager
Huang Shi Nan 黄世南	Wang Bao 王豹	Peter's "brother" from Taiwan
Li Wenhai 李文海	Con Organisation "Dad" 老爸	Mo Yan's father

== Episodes ==
=== Drama series ===
No.	Title	Original release date
1	"Episode 1"	October 9, 2012
2	"Episode 2"	October 10, 2012
3	"Episode 3"	October 11, 2012
4	"Episode 4"	October 12, 2012
5	"Episode 5"	October 15, 2012
6	"Episode 6"	October 16, 2012
7	"Episode 7"	October 17, 2012
8	"Episode 8"	October 18, 2012
9	"Episode 9"	October 19, 2012
10	"Episode 10"	October 22, 2012
11	"Episode 11"	October 23, 2012
12	"Episode 12"	October 24, 2012
13	"Episode 13"	October 25, 2012
14	"Episode 14"	October 26, 2012
15	"Episode 15"	October 29, 2012
16	"Episode 16"	October 30, 2012
17	"Episode 17"	October 31, 2012
18	"Episode 18"	November 1, 2012
19	"Episode 19"	November 2, 2012
20	"Episode 20"	November 5, 2012

=== Webisode version ===
No.	Title	Original release date
1	"Greed"	October 9, 2012
2	"Phone Scam"	October 10, 2012
3	"Casting the Net"	October 11, 2012
4	"Sleight of Hand"	October 12, 2012
5	"What Price is the "Perfect" coffee?"	October 15, 2012
6	"A Scammer's Sorrows"	October 16, 2012
7	"The Truth of Lies"	October 17, 2012
8	"Untold Feelings"	October 25, 2012

== International broadcast ==
This drama is one of the first dramas to be broadcast exclusive in Malaysia after its first telecast of two weeks.

Country of Broadcast	Broadcasting Network	Debut	Finale	Preceded by	Followed by
Malaysia	Astro Shuang Xing	25 October 2012 at 4.30pm, weekdays (encore on 26 October at 3.30pm, weekdays)	21 November 2012 (encore on 22 November)	Poetic Justice	It Takes Two
China	CCTV8	11 March 2014 at 5.00pm, weekdays			

== See also ==
- List of programmes broadcast by Mediacorp Channel 8

== Accolades ==
Organisation	Year	Category	Nominee(s)	Result	Ref
Star Awards	2013	Favourite Male Character	Christopher Lee	Nominated	
Star Awards	2013	Favourite Onscreen Couple (Drama)	Christopher Lee and Jesseca Liu	Nominated	
Star Awards	2013	Best Supporting Actress	Lin Meijiao	Won	
Star Awards	2013	Best Drama Serial	—N/a	Nominated	
