= The Invincible Squad =

- 迷幻特警
- Genre: Police procedural Action/Thriller
- Starring: Xie Shaoguang; Phyllis Quek; Jeff Wang; Yvonne Lim; Florence Tan
- Opening theme: 疑惑 by Phyllis Quek
- Ending theme: 着迷 by Phyllis Quek
- No. of episodes: 13

Original release
- Network: MediaCorp Channel 8
- Release: September 2001

The Invincible Squad (Chinese: 迷幻特警) is a Singaporean Chinese police drama series which aired on MediaCorp Channel 8 in 2001. It is about a police special task force who are called to solve six difficult cases.

== Plot ==
The series contains six short stories, each focusing on mysterious and unusual cases that require a special team to help solve.

The head of the force is a person named "Z", who once had a bright future with the police force. His career with the police was cut short when his wife disappeared, under mysterious circumstances, causing him to enter depression. Also in the task force is Si Feng, a person with an unhappy childhood, and Zi Ling, a psychic who has a crush on Z.

== Cast ==
- Xie Shaoguang
- Phyllis Quek
- Jeff Wang
- Florence Tan as Sun Jiawen/Diana

== Accolades ==
Organisation	Year	Category	Nominee	Result	Ref
Star Awards	2001	Best Supporting Actress	Florence Tan	Nominated	

== See also ==
- List of programmes broadcast by Mediacorp Channel 8
