= Jacelyn Tay =

Singaporean actress and health coach (born 1975)

- Born: 12 June 1975 (age 51); Singapore
- Other name: Zheng Xiuzhen
- Education: Cedar Girls' Secondary School; Catholic Junior College
- Alma mater: National University of Singapore
- Occupations: Actress; host; health coach; businesswoman; writer
- Years active: 1995–present
- Spouse: Brian Wong (m. 2010; div. 2018)
- Children: 1
- Awards: Star Search 1995: Female Champion

Chinese name
- Traditional Chinese: 鄭秀珍
- Simplified Chinese: 郑秀珍
- Hanyu Pinyin: Zhèng Xiùzhēn

Jacelyn Tay Siew Cheng (born 12 June 1975) is a Singaporean health coach, businesswoman and former actress.

During the 2000s, Tay established herself. She won the Star Awards for Top 10 Most Popular Female Artistes seven times, and was nominated for the Star Awards for Best Actress five times.

In 2004 and 2005 respectively, Tay published the books Feel Good Look Good with Jacelyn and Make-up for Asian Women. She further pursued a career in the wellness industry in 2006 by setting up Body Inc. Holistic Wellness Centre. She is currently a wellness coach and a registered BFR practitioner.

== Career ==
=== Early career ===
Jacelyn Tay was crowned the female champion of the local Star Search Singapore competition in 1995.

After signing with TCS (later MediaCorp), Tay established herself, playing leading roles in numerous dramas. Tay won the Star Awards for Top 10 Most Popular Female Artistes seven times, from 1998 to 2005. In addition, she was awarded the Most Popular Female Artiste in Taiwan at Star Awards 1999, beating out 'Ah Jies' Zoe Tay, Fann Wong, Ann Kok and Phyllis Quek.

Some of Tay's roles include 'He Xiangu' in the television series Legend of the Eight Immortals and as Dongfang Bubai in The Legendary Swordsman, the latter of which earned Tay her first nomination for the Star Awards for Best Actress. To date, Tay has been nominated for the Star Awards for Best Actress five times, and holds the record for most 'Best Actress' nominations without a win.

=== Leaving acting ===
She left Mediacorp in 2006 to focus her attention on her wellness company.

In 2012, Tay made her acting comeback in the Mediacorp Channel 8 dramas Pillow Talk (Singaporean TV series) and Game Plan (TV series). In 2015, Tay briefly returned to acting when she took on the villainous role of Irene in the musical drama Crescendo (TV series).

== Personal life ==
On 10 October 2010, Tay married Brian Wong, her boyfriend of two years. In 2011, Tay gave birth to a boy, Zavier Wong. On 18 November 2018, Tay announced that they were finalising their divorce proceedings.

== Filmography ==
=== Television series ===
- 1995
  - Tales of the Third Kind 第三类剧场
- 1996
  - Tofu Street (Bai Shui Xian)
  - Triad Justice 飞跃珍珠坊
  - My Destiny With You 缘来是你
  - Tales of the City II 都市奇情II
  - Telemovie: Spirit On Wheels 电视电影:鬼德士
  - Telemovie: Life on the Run 魂断四面佛
  - Living By Night 都是夜归人 (Fan Zi Yun)
- 1997
  - The Choice Partner 错爱今生
  - The Guest People 客家之歌
  - Dreams 七个梦
- 1998
  - Legend of the Eight Immortals 东游记 (He Xiangu)
- 1999
  - Are You My Brother? 错体双宝
  - Coupe De Scorpion 天蝎行动
- 2000
  - The Legendary Swordsman 笑傲江湖 (Dongfang Bubai)
  - The Voices Within 心灵物语 (Janice)
- 2001
  - Love Me, Love Me Not 真爱无敌
  - The Hotel 大酒店 (Rainbow)
  - Master Swordsman Lu Xiaofeng 陸小鳳之決戰前後
- 2002
  - The Wing of Desire 天使的诱惑
  - The Money Game 金钱本色
- 2003
  - Romance De Amour 一加一等于三
  - Love Is Beautiful 美丽家庭
- 2004
  - The Ties That Bind 家财万贯
  - You Are The One 二分之一缘分 (Telecast in February 2005)
- 2005
  - Beyond the Axis of Truth II 法医X档案II
  - Love Concierge 爱的掌门人 (Louise Jiang Ru Yi)
- 2012
  - Pillow Talk 再见单人床 (Alice)
  - Game Plan 千方百计 (Mo Yan)
- 2015
  - Crescendo 起飞 (Irene Lin Meiling)

=== Film ===
- 2003
  - After School 放学后 (Lin Yi Fang)
- 2011
  - Homecoming (笑着回家）

=== Variety show ===
- 2009
  - CelebriTEA Break II (Guest)
- 2013
  - Three Dish One Soup 三菜一汤 (Guest)

== Bibliography ==
- Makeup For Asian Women (Times Editions – Marshall Cavendish, 10 June 2005) ISBN 981-261-079-0
- Feel Good, Look Good with Jacelyn (Lee Mei Lin, editor, Times Editions, Singapore, 1 July 2004) ISBN 981-232-816-5

== Awards and nominations ==
Year	Ceremony	Category	Nominated work	Result
1996	Star Awards	Best Newcomer	—N/a	Nominated
1997	Star Awards	Top 10 Most Popular Female Artistes	—N/a	Nominated
1998	Star Awards	Top 10 Most Popular Female Artistes	—N/a	Won
1999	Star Awards	Top 10 Most Popular Female Artistes	—N/a	Nominated
2000	Star Awards	Top 10 Most Popular Female Artistes	—N/a	Won
2000	Star Awards	Best Actress	The Legendary Swordsman (as Dongfang Bubai)	Nominated
2001	Star Awards	Top 10 Most Popular Female Artistes	—N/a	Won
2002	Star Awards	Best Actress	The Wing of Desire (as Hu Danchun)	Nominated
2002	Star Awards	Top 10 Most Popular Female Artistes	—N/a	Won
2003	Star Awards	Best Actress	Romance de Amour (as Wang Qinghui)	Nominated
2003	Star Awards	Top 10 Most Popular Female Artistes	—N/a	Won
2004	Star Awards	Top 10 Most Popular Female Artistes	—N/a	Won
2005	Star Awards	Best Actress	You Are The One (as Hao Meili)	Nominated
2005	Star Awards	Top 10 Most Popular Female Artistes	—N/a	Won
2006	Star Awards	Best Actress	Love Concierge (as Jiang Ruyi)	Nominated
2006	Star Awards	Top 10 Most Popular Female Artistes	—N/a	Nominated
