= Springs of Life =

- 春到人间
- Genre: Period drama Comedy
- Directed by: Leong Lye Lin 梁来玲
- Starring: Chew Chor Meng; Sharon Au; Li-Lin; Huang Wenyong; Chen Shucheng
- Opening theme: 装傻 by 柯贵民, sung by Sharon Au and Li-Lin 快乐至上 by Dreamz FM 梦飞船
- Country of origin: Singapore
- Original language: Chinese
- No. of episodes: 60

Production
- Producers: Ma Jiajun 马家骏; Daisy Chan 陈建仪
- Running time: approx. 45 minutes per episode

Original release
- Network: MediaCorp TV Channel 8
- Release: December 2002

Related
- Kopi-O II; Viva Le Famille; Wok of Life (1999)

Springs of Life (春到人间) is a Singaporean Chinese drama which aired in 2002. It was produced following the success of Wok of Life. Unusual for a locally produced period drama at that time, the theme song's introduction is in a rock and roll style.

== Synopsis ==
The story begins in the 1950s and spans about three decades. A young entrepreneur Dapao is on a quest to learn the secret of a special medicinal oil in hopes of striking the jackpot. Meanwhile, a pair of singing sisters try to make their way in showbiz.

== Cast ==
- Chew Chor Meng as Cai Dapao 蔡大炮
- Sharon Au as Su Feifei 苏菲菲
- Li-Lin as Su Fangfang 苏芳芳
- Huang Wenyong as Su Hua 苏华
- Alan Tern as Cai Daming 蔡大鸣
- Carole Lin as Cai Daxiao 蔡大笑
- Chen Shucheng as Cai Baijia 蔡百佳
- Yan Bingliang as Cai Bailiang 蔡百良
- Cheng Pei-pei as Yun Shuheng 云书恒
- Priscelia Chan
- Chen Hanwei
- Jin Yinji as Grandma Wu 巫婆婆
- Lin Meijiao
- Ye Shipin
- Mai Haowei
- Cavin Soh
- Brandon Wong
- Liu Qiulian as Xiannü 仙女
- Bryan Chan as Physician Yang
- Liang Tian as Physician Chen

== Reception ==
Springs of Life was extremely popular and broke the record held by Love Me, Love Me Not for viewership ratings.

== Notes ==
- The 2012 anniversary drama Joys of Life (花样人间) follows a similar theme to Springs of Life and Wok of Life and also stars Chew Chor Meng and Huang Wenyong. Only Chew has starred in all three dramas. Unlike many typical period dramas produced by MediaCorp such as The Awakening or The Little Nyonya, these "ren jian" (人间) period dramas are much more lighthearted and humorous.
- Many veteran artistes from the SBC and TCS era made guest appearances or were part of the supporting cast, such as Madeline Chu (朱乐玲) and Tammy Chow (周黛兰). Veteran Chinese actress Cheng Pei-pei also joined the cast.

== 2003 Accolades ==
The Star Awards 2003 was generally dominated by another popular long-running drama Holland V but Springs of Life managed several nominations.

Award	Nominee	Result
Best Actor 最佳男主角	Chew Chor Meng 周初明	Nominated
Best Supporting Actress 最佳女配角	Carole Lin 林晓佩	Nominated
Best Drama Serial 最佳电视剧	—N/a	Nominated
Best Theme Song 最佳主题曲	Sharon Au 欧菁仙 & Wong Li-Lin 黄丽玲 -《装傻》	Nominated
