= Vivian Lai =

Singaporean actress and host (born 1976)

- Born: 18 December 1976 (age 49); Taipei, Taiwan
- Occupations: Actress; television host; businesswoman
- Years active: 1999-present
- Spouse: Alain Ong (m. 2001)
- Children: 2
- Awards: Full list

Chinese name
- Traditional Chinese: 賴怡伶
- Simplified Chinese: 赖怡伶
- Hanyu Pinyin: Lài Yílíng
- Jyutping: Laai6 Ji4 Ling4

Vivian Lai Yi-ling (born 18 December 1976) is a Taiwanese-born actress, television host and businesswoman based in Singapore.

== Early life ==
Born in Taiwan, Lai migrated to Singapore with her Taiwanese family when she was still a student.

== Career ==
=== Media ===
Lai joined Star Search Singapore 1999 and was the winner in the Singapore edition and the overall champion in the female contestant category.

Lai started out as an actress, making her debut in Knotty Liaisons, and won good reviews. After a few dramas, Lai attempted hosting with her first variety show, Property Classified. She eventually focused on hosting and has hosted various kinds of programmes ranging from food reviews to travelogues. In 2012, after numerous nominations, she won her first professional award, the Best Supporting Actress award, at the Star Awards 2012 for her role as a Chinese immigrant in Love Thy Neighbour.

Her current management company is LNX Global headed by Li Nanxing.

=== Business ventures ===
In 2014, Lai, with fellow host Quan Yifeng and hairstylist Addy Lee, set up the social media and production company 3x Media Production.

In September 2019, Lai set up her bubble tea brand Teabrary.

Since the COVID-19 pandemic, Lai has been active as a livestream e-commerce vendor. She is also a co-host of The Wonder Shop, an infomercial series on Channel 8.

=== Brand ambassador ===
Lai is the brand ambassador for Kirei Kirei soap, Samsung electrical appliances and Osim massage. She was also the brand ambassador for Pokka International and Deputy Group CEO of Pokka Corporation from 2008 to 2018. In 2012, she was paid S$1 million to continue endorsing the brand. Lai's contract as an ambassador was terminated in the October 2018.

== Personal life ==
Lai is married to Alain Ong and the couple have two daughters, Vera and Ariel. Their house in central Singapore was estimated to be worth $8 million in 2018.

Ong is the CEO of Pokka International and Deputy Group CEO of Pokka Corporation which Lai has been brand ambassador for multiple years from around 2008. This has thus attracted its fair share of controversy, amid allegations of conflict of interest which in 2012, she was paid S$1 million to continue endorsing the brand.

In September 2018, her husband, Ong, was suspended from his posts by Pokka Corporation following an internal audit and would later take up a new appointment offered by Kimly, which he was a non-executive director of Kimly. Lai's contract as an ambassador was terminated in the following month, despite claims by Mediacorp that her contract would remain unchanged.

In 2022, Lai revealed that she suffered from a slipped disc. She chose not to go for a surgery which has 50% chance of success and chose traditional chinese medicine and acupuncture to improve her condition.

Lai has adopted seven dogs and encourages others to adopt instead of buying pets. She takes care of them with her daughters and domestic helper with a monthly pet budget of $1,500 to $2,000.

== Filmography ==
=== Films ===
Year	Title	Role	Notes	Ref.
2008	Money No Enough 2	Zhou Yanyan		
2009	Where Got Ghost?	Zhou Yanyan		

=== Television series ===
Year	Title	Role	Notes	Ref.
2000	Knotty Liaisons	Jiaxuan		
2000	Adam's Company	Elaine		
2000	Dare To Strike			
2001	Looking For Stars	Piggy		
2001	The Hotel	Lai Meiling		
2001	Three Women and A Half	Xiaoping		
2002	Bukit Ho Swee	Wang Qing		
2002	Kopi-O II	Shuyun		
2002	The Unbeatables III	Dong Meiyao		
2003	Holland V	Mo Rourou		
2004	Double Happiness	Luo Jiaqian		
2004	Double Happiness II	Luo Jiaqian		
2005	Love at 0°C	Liu Siqi		
2006	Time to Heal			
2007	Live Again	Jenny		
2007	Making Miracles	Xu Xiuyuan		
2007	The Homecoming	Qianyi		
2008	Just in Singapore	Jinyan		
2008	Love Blossoms II	Fan Fan		
2011	Be Happy	Mable		
2011	Love Thy Neighbour	Shanshan		
2014	World at Your Feet	Mo Lihua		
2015	Super Senior	Ivy Ji Shanzhong		
2016	The Queen	Zeng Jing		
2019	My One In A Million (我的万里挑一)	Vivian Lai		
2019	The Good Fight (致胜出击)	Rourou		
2019	A World of Difference (都市狂想)	Rui En		
2021	Soul Old Yet So Young (心里住着老灵魂)	Cindy Yen		
2021	The Heartland Hero	Lexi		

=== Variety shows ===
Year	Title	Notes	Ref.
2006	Property Classified		
2007	On the Beat II		
2007	My Beautiful Life		
2007	Star Awards Post-Show Party		
2008	The NTUC Show		
2008	Lunar New Year Eve Celebration		
2008	Dialect Delights		
2008	Bioskin Dreams Come True II		
2008	On the Beat III		
2008	Amuse Me		
2008	DIY My Home		
2009	My House Husband's Journal 小男人周记		
2009	Amuse U		
2010	You Are The Man		
2011	Sizzling Woks 3		
2011	Ladies Nite		
2011	Home Makeover 2		
2012	My Fair Ladies		
2012	Silver Carnival		
2012	Simply Exquisite		
2012	Dessert Time		
2013	Say It!		
2013	Laughing Out Loud		
2014	Eat and Be Merry		
2014	Black Rose 2		
2014	Style: Check-In 4	Guest Host	
2014	Say It! 2		
2014	Style: Check-In 5		
2014	Ladies Nite 3		
2015	Hey Chef!		
2015	Hey Gorgeous 2015		
2015	The Successor		
2016	Touch Screen Cuisine		
2016	What's In The Fridge?		
2017	A Gift for Mum		
2019	The Destined One	Guest Matchmaker	
2020	A Gift For Mum 3		

== Discography ==
=== Compilation albums ===
Year	English title	Mandarin title
2012	MediaCorp Music Lunar New Year Album 12	新传媒群星金龙接财神
2018	MediaCorp Music Lunar New Year Album 18	新传媒群星阿狗狗过好年
2019	MediaCorp Music Lunar New Year Album 19	新传媒群星猪饱饱欢乐迎肥年
2020	MediaCorp Music Lunar New Year Album 20	裕鼠鼠纳福迎春了

== Awards and nominations ==
Year	Ceremony	Category	Nominated work	Result	Ref
2000	Star Awards	Best Newcomer	—N/a	Nominated	
2001	Star Awards	Top 10 Most Popular Female Artistes	—N/a	Won	
2003	Star Awards	Top 10 Most Popular Female Artistes	—N/a	Won	
2004	Star Awards	Top 10 Most Popular Female Artistes	—N/a	Won	
2004	Star Awards	Best Supporting Actress	Double Happiness (as Luo Jiaqian)	Nominated	
2005	Star Awards	Best Supporting Actress	Double Happiness II (as Luo Jiaqian)	Nominated	
2007	Star Awards	Top 10 Most Popular Female Artistes	—N/a	Won	
2009	Star Awards	Top 10 Most Popular Female Artistes	—N/a	Won	
2010	Star Awards	Top 10 Most Popular Female Artistes	—N/a	Won	
2011	Star Awards	Top 10 Most Popular Female Artistes	—N/a	Won	
2012	Star Awards	Top 10 Most Popular Female Artistes	—N/a	Won	
2012	Star Awards	Best Supporting Actress	Love Thy Neighbour (as Shan Shan)	Won	
2013	Star Awards	Top 10 Most Popular Female Artistes	—N/a	Won	
2014	Star Awards	Top 10 Most Popular Female Artistes	—N/a	Won	
2014	Star Awards	Best Variety Show Host	Finding U	Nominated	
2015	Star Awards	All-Time Favourite Artiste	—N/a	Won	
2015	Star Awards	Star Awards for YES 933 Best Speech	—N/a	Won	
2015	Star Awards	Asian Skin Solutions Most Radiant Skin Award	—N/a	Won	
