= The Legendary Swordsman =

2000 Singaporean TV series

- Poster
- Also known as: The Smiling, Proud Wanderer; State of Divinity
- 笑傲江湖
- Genre: Wuxia
- Based on: The Smiling, Proud Wanderer by Jin Yong
- Screenplay by: Shuai Xuefang; Liu Guilan; He Qi'an
- Directed by: Huo Zhikai; Hu Huixiang
- Starring: Steve Ma; Fann Wong; Ivy Lee; Chew Chor Meng; Jacelyn Tay; Florence Tan; Chen Tianwen; Priscelia Chan; Zheng Geping
- Theme music composer: Lin Yixin; Ke Guimin
- Opening theme: "Lofty Sentiments, Laughing in the Jianghu" (豪情笑江湖) by Fann Wong
- Ending theme: "Sing to a Drink" (对酒当歌) by Wu Jiaming and Ke Guimin
- Composer: Benny Wong
- Country of origin: Singapore
- Original language: Mandarin
- No. of episodes: 40

Production
- Executive producer: Lie Fengyun
- Producer: Ma Jiajun
- Production locations: Singapore; Myanmar
- Editor: Xu Jiayan
- Running time: ≈45 minutes per episode
- Production company: Mediacorp

Original release
- Network: TCS-8
- Release: 18 May – 26 July 2000

The Legendary Swordsman (笑傲江湖) is a Singaporean wuxia television series adapted from the novel The Smiling, Proud Wanderer by Jin Yong. First broadcast on TCS-8 in 2000, it starred Steve Ma, Fann Wong, Ivy Lee, Chew Chor Meng, Jacelyn Tay, Florence Tan, Chen Tianwen, Priscelia Chan and Zheng Geping. Although most of the production took place in Singapore, some scenes were shot in Myanmar.

== Differences between the novel and series ==
The plot deviates significantly from the novel. Notable differences include: Ren Yingying appearing much earlier in the series than her first appearance in the novel; Ren Woxing is killed by Yue Buqun instead of dying from a stroke; an additional subplot on a romance between Tian Boguang and Lan Fenghuang; Dongfang Bubai is given a greater role in the series as the ultimate villain as opposed to his role as a minor antagonist in the novel, in which he only appears in one chapter.

== Cast ==
- Steve Ma as Linghu Chong
- Fann Wong as Ren Yingying
- Ivy Lee as Yue Lingshan
- Chew Chor Meng as Lin Pingzhi
- Jacelyn Tay as Dongfang Bubai
- Florence Tan as Lan Fenghuang
- Chen Tianwen as Tian Boguang
- Priscelia Chan as Yilin
- Zheng Geping as Yue Buqun
- Hong Huifang as Ning Zhongze
- Natalie Faye as Qiu Xueying
- Richard Low as Ren Woxing
- Li Haijie as Zuo Lengshan
- Huang Shinan as Xiang Wentian
- Rayson Tan as Liu Zhengfeng
- Liang Weidong as Qu Yang
- Huang Wenyong as Lin Zhennan
- Huang Shaoting as Lin Zhennan's wife
- Hong Peixing as Yu Canghai
- Jin Yinji as Mute Granny
- Brandon Wong as Lao Denuo
- Chen Junguang as Lu Dayou
- Li Zhizhou as Mu Gaofeng

== Production ==
Ann Kok was initially selected for the role of Yue Lingshan but she rejected the offer. Jacelyn Tay also turned down her role as Dongfang Bubai initially, but retook it after a telling-off by Steve Ma in the press.

== Accolades ==
Organisation	Year	Award	Nominee	Result	Ref
Star Awards	2000	Best Actress	Jacelyn Tay	Nominated	
Star Awards	2000	Best Actress	Fann Wong	Nominated	
Star Awards	2000	Best Supporting Actor	Zheng Geping	Nominated	
Star Awards	2000	Best Supporting Actress	Hong Huifang	Nominated	
Star Awards	2000	Best Supporting Actress	Florence Tan	Nominated	
