= Star Awards for Top 10 Most Popular Female Artistes =

Singapore media award

- Awarded for: Most Popular Female Artistes
- Country: Singapore
- Presented by: Mediacorp
- First award: February 26, 1994; 32 years ago
- Most recent winners: Chen Biyu; Chen Ning; Paige Chua; Gao Mei Gui; Hong Ling; Tasha Low; Chantalle Ng; Denise Camillia Tan; Hazelle Teo; Ya Hui (2026)

Highlights
- Most awards: Ivy Lee; Phyllis Quek; Jacelyn Tay (7 each)
- Most nominations: Pan Lingling (27)

The Star Awards for Top 10 Most Popular Female Artistes is an award presented since its inception in 1994.

== History ==
Chen Liping, Chen Xiuhuan, Pan Lingling, Aileen Tan, and Zoe Tay were the five female recipients of the inaugural 10 Most Popular Artistes award. The winners were determined by a majority vote from the public via telephone and SMS text voting.

In 1994 and 1995, the Most Popular Actress award was also awarded to the female artiste who topped the votes. Tay won the award in both 1994 and 1995, making her the only recipient of this award.

Since 1997, the number of recipients for each category was expanded to ten and the award was renamed as Top 10 Most Popular Female Artistes.

In 2004, the All-Time Favourite Artiste was introduced. Artistes who had received ten prior Star Awards for Top 10 Most Popular Male / Female Artistes were automatically conferred the title, and were removed from the nomination pool permanently. A total of 19 female artistes have since achieved this status and are no longer eligible to be nominated.

In 2023, the Most Popular Rising Stars award was introduced for artistes who have been in the entertainment industry for five years or less. A win in this category will also count towards the overall Top 10 tally.

== Eligibility ==
Initially, only full-time Mediacorp actresses were eligible to be nominated. In 1997, a rule change allowed artistes from the variety sector to contest for the award.

In 2018, the rules were changed again to allow contracted, project-based and/or non-Mediacorp artistes to be nominated.

== Recipients ==
Since its inception, the award saw a total of 188 female artistes being nominated, of which 53 artistes had won at least one award, and 19 artistes had been conferred the All-Time Favourite Artiste. Chen Biyu, Chen Ning, Paige Chua, Gao Mei Gui, Hong Ling, Tasha Low, Chantalle Ng, Denise Camillia Tan, Hazelle Teo and Ya Hui are the most recent winners in the Top 10 Most Popular Female Artistes category.

Juin Teh is the most recent winner in the Most Popular Rising Stars category.

Colour key
Artiste received or expected to receive the All-Time Favourite Artiste award
Artiste won the Top 10 Most Popular Female Artistes award
Artiste won the Most Popular Rising Stars award
Artiste was nominated for the Top 10 Most Popular Female Artistes award
Artiste was nominated for the Most Popular Rising Stars award
Artiste was not nominated for the award

Artiste	Year																															Wins	Noms
Artiste	1994	1995	1996	1997	1998	1999	2000	2001	2002	2003	2004	2005	2006	2007	2009	2010	2011	2012	2013	2014	2015	2016	2017	2018	2019	2021	2022	2023	2024	2025	2026	Wins	Noms
Zoe Tay	1	2	3	4	5	6	7	8	9	10	✔																					10	10
Fann Wong		1	2	3	4	5	6	7	8	9	10	✔																				10	10
Chen Liping	1	2	3	4	5	6	7	N	8	N	9	10	✔																			10	12
Huang Biren				1		2	3	4	5	6	7	8	9	10	✔																	10	10
Xiang Yun		N		N	N	N	1	2	3	4	5	6	7	8	9	10	✔															10	14
Jeanette Aw										1	2	3	4	N	5	6	7	8	9	10	✔											10	11
Vivian Lai								1		2	3			4	5	6	7	8	9	10	✔											10	10
Rui En												1	2	3	4	5	6	7	8	9	10	✔										10	10
Joanne Peh											1	2	N	N	3	4	5	6	7	8	9	10	✔									10	12
Quan Yi Fong												1	2	3	4	5	6		7	8	9	10	✔									10	10
Kym Ng					1	2						N	3	4	N	N	N	5	6	N	7	8	9	10	✔							10	15
Felicia Chin												N	1	2	3	4					5	6	7	8	9	N	10	✔				10	12
Rebecca Lim																		1	2	3	4	5	6	7	8	9	10	✔				10	10
Ann Kok		1	2	3	4	5										N	6	7	8							9		10	✔			10	11
Jesseca Liu													1	2	3	4						5	6		7	8	9	10	✔			10	10
Yvonne Lim					1	N	N	N	N	N	N	N	N	N	2	3	4	5	6	7						8	9		10	✔		10	19
Carrie Wong																					1	2	3	4	5	6	7	8	9	10	✔	10	10
Paige Chua																	N	1	N	N	2	N	3	4	5	6	7	8		9	10	10	14
Ya Hui																				1	N	N	2	3	4	5	6	7	8	9	10	10	12
Pan Lingling	1	N		2	3		4	N	N	N	N	N	N	N	N	N	N	N	N	N		N	N	5	6	N	N	N	N	N		6	27
Belinda Lee																N	N	N	1	2	3	4		5		N			N			5	10
Hong Ling																							N		N	1	2	N	3	4	5	5	8
Chantalle Ng																										N	1	2	3	4	5	5	6
Chen Ning																										N		1	2	3	4	4	5
Chen Bi Yu																												1	2	3	4	4	4
Tasha Low																												1	2	3	4	4	4
Cynthia Koh		N	N	1	N	N	N	N	N		N						N	2							N		3		N	N	N	3	16
Denise Camillia Tan																										N		1	N	2	3	3	5
Gao Mei Gui																												1	N	2	3	3	4
Chen Xiuhuan	1																								2							2	2
Lina Ng		N	1	N	N																				2	N	N	N	N	N		2	10
Tong Bing Yu																				1	N	N	2									2	4
Jayley Woo																					N	1	2		N	N						2	5
Jin Yinji											N	N			N	N			N	N	N	N		1		2	N					2	11
Sora Ma																							1									1	1
Sheila Sim																						N	N	1	N		N					1	5
Hong Huifang							N							N	N	N	N	N	N	N	N	N	N	N	1	N	N	N	N			1	17
Bonnie Loo																							N	N	N	1		N	N	N	N	1	8
He Ying Ying																							N			N			1	N	N	1	5
Xixi Lim																												N	1	N	N	1	4
Jernelle Oh																												N	1	N	N	1	4
Hazelle Teo																												N	N	N	1	1	4
Juin Teh																												N	N	N	1	1	4
Artistes who have not won in the past 10 years
Ivy Lee		1	N			2	3	4	5	N	N	N	N	6	7																	7	12
Phyllis Quek				1	2	N	3	4	5	6	7																					7	8
Jacelyn Tay				N	1	N	2	3	4	5	6	7	N																			7	10
Sharon Au				N	N	1	2	3	4	5	6																					6	8
Michelle Chia						1						2	3	4	N	5	6	N									N					6	9
Aileen Tan	1	N	N	2	N			N	N	N								N				N	N	N	N	N	N	N		N	N	2	18
Evelyn Tan					1	2																							N	N		2	4
Fiona Xie								1	N	N	N	N	2	N	N																	2	8
Michelle Saram									1	2																						2	2
Michelle Chong												1	N	N	N	N	2	N														2	7
Julie Tan																			N	N	1	2	N	N								2	6
Wong Li-Lin				1				N	N	N	N																					1	5
Zhou Ying																	1	N	N	N												1	4
Patricia Mok					N	N	N	N	N	N	N	N	N	N	N														N	N	N	0	14
Priscelia Chan										N	N		N	N		N	N	N	N		N		N				N	N		N	N	0	14
Lin Meijiao						N	N		N						N	N	N		N		N		N		N	N	N					0	12
Lim Peifen																	N	N	N	N	N		N	N	N				N	N		0	10
Wendy Zeng					N			N															N	N				N	N	N	N	0	8
Bukoh Mary												N	N															N	N	N	N	0	6
Dawn Yeoh														N	N										N	N				N	N	0	6
Ke Le																										N		N	N	N	N	0	5
Kate Pang																		N		N		N	N									0	4
Diana Ser				N		N						N												N								0	4
Tracer Wong							N	N																						N	N	0	4
Tay Ying																										N			N	N	N	0	4
Chua Lee Lian																												N	N	N	N	0	4
Gao Yixin																												N	N	N	N	0	4
Goh Wei Ying																												N	N	N	N	0	4
Huang Shu Jun																												N	N	N	N	0	4
Liang Peng																												N	N	N	N	0	4
Lin Lingzhi																												N	N	N	N	0	4
Lina Tan																												N	N	N	N	0	4
Qi Qi																												N	N	N	N	0	4
Siau Jiahui																												N	N	N	N	0	4
Violet Fenying																												N	N	N	N	0	4
Zeng Shenglian																												N	N	N	N	0	4
Chen Qijia																												N	N	N	N	0	4
Cheryl Chou																												N	N	N	N	0	4
Regene Lim																												N	N	N	N	0	4
Sheryl Ang																												N	N	N	N	0	4
Daryl-Ann																												N	N	N	N	0	4
Gini Chang																												N	N	N	N	0	4
Kiki Lim																												N	N	N	N	0	4
Oh Ling En																												N	N	N	N	0	4
Seow Sin Nee																												N	N	N	N	0	4
Liu Lingling																								N			N			N		0	3
Mei Xin																										N			N	N		0	3
Jasmine Sim																										N		N			N	0	3
Fang Rong																												N	N		N	0	3
Shanice Koh																												N	N		N	0	3
JJ Neo																												N	N	N		0	3
Wang Wenhui																												N	N	N		0	3
Ye Jia Yun																												N		N	N	0	3
Ferlyn G																													N	N	N	0	3
Irene Ang																													N	N	N	0	3
Lin Ru Ping																													N	N	N	0	3
Abigail Chue																													N	N	N	0	3
Isabelle Quek																													N	N	N	0	3
Kharissa Pundarika																													N	N	N	0	3
Joey Tay																													N	N	N	0	3
Yunis To																													N	N	N	0	3
Kimberly Chia																									N	N						0	2
Chen Huihui									N																				N			0	2
Jojo Goh																												N			N	0	2
Joey Pink																												N		N		0	2
Xuan Ong																													N	N		0	2
Karyn Wong																													N	N		0	2
Samantha Tan																													N		N	0	2
Natalie Chua																														N	N	0	2
Kayly Loh																														N	N	0	2
Mindee Ong																														N	N	0	2
Christy Mai																														N	N	0	2
Denise Fong																														N	N	0	2
Seraph Sun																							N									0	1
Joanna Dong																								N								0	1
Hayley Woo																								N								0	1
Eleanor Lee																										N						0	1
Michelle Wong																										N						0	1
Jin Meng Yang Zi																												N				0	1
Charlyn Lin																												N				0	1
Kimberly Wang																												N				0	1
Cheryl Cheng																												N				0	1
Khaw Xin Lin																												N				0	1
Cheris Lee																												N				0	1
Boon Hui Lu																													N			0	1
Matilda Tao																													N			0	1
Joy Yak																													N			0	1
Doreen Choo																														N		0	1
Foong Wai See																														N		0	1
Apple Hong																														N		0	1
Jessica Hsuan																														N		0	1
Lynn Lim																														N		0	1
Meeki Ng																														N		0	1
Stella Tan																														N		0	1
Grace Teo																														N		0	1
Ivonne Saw																														N		0	1
Adele Wong																														N		0	1
Emma Panitsara Yang																														N		0	1
April Chan																														N		0	1
Zoey Li																														N		0	1
Queenie Lim																														N		0	1
Charmian Tan																														N		0	1
Kimberiy Tan																														N		0	1
Angel Lim																															N	0	1
Gina Tan																															N	0	1
Hong Zhaorong																															N	0	1
Kendra																															N	0	1
Michelle Tay																															N	0	1
Jolynn Min																															N	0	1
Miss Mole																															N	0	1
Nur Sabrina Nasir																															N	0	1
Ribbon Ooi																															N	0	1
Thor Yin Wei																															N	0	1
Valnice Yek																															N	0	1
Agnes Goh																															N	0	1
Ariel Chua																															N	0	1
Beatrice Pung																															N	0	1
Fiona Chua																															N	0	1
Gladys Bay																															N	0	1
Gladys Ng																															N	0	1
Kacy Choo																															N	0	1
Lorraine Wong																															N	0	1
Lv Jia Ying																															N	0	1
Nickie Chia																															N	0	1
Tiffany Ho																															N	0	1
Artistes who have not been nominated in the past 10 years
May Phua				N			N	N																								0	3
Tracy Lee																			N	N	N											0	3
Angela Ang			N	N																												0	2
Wang Yanqing					N	N																										0	2
Koh Chieng Mun						N			N																							0	2
Florence Tan							N			N																						0	2
Youyi																					N	N										0	2
Zeng Huifen			N																													0	1
Ding Lan				N																												0	1
Carole Lin				N																												0	1
Cassandra See				N																												0	1
Irin Gan					N																											0	1
Amanda Ho					N																											0	1
Ericia Lee							N																									0	1
Lynn Poh							N																									0	1
Joey Swee											N																					0	1
Chew Sin Huey													N																			0	1
Wayne Chua																N																0	1
Eelyn Kok																	N															0	1
Tiffany Leong																	N															0	1

== Award records ==
Record	Artiste	Count	Remarks
Won ten consecutive times since first nomination	Zoe Tay	5 artistes	1994, 1995, 1996, 1997, 1998, 1999, 2000, 2001, 2002, 2003
Won ten consecutive times since first nomination	Fann Wong	5 artistes	1995, 1996, 1997, 1998, 1999, 2000, 2001, 2002, 2003, 2004
Won ten consecutive times since first nomination	Rui En	5 artistes	2005, 2006, 2007, 2009, 2010, 2011, 2012, 2013, 2014, 2015
Won ten consecutive times since first nomination	Rebecca Lim	5 artistes	2012, 2013, 2014, 2015, 2016, 2017, 2018, 2019, 2021, 2022
Won ten consecutive times since first nomination	Carrie Wong	5 artistes	2015, 2016, 2017, 2018, 2019, 2021, 2022, 2023, 2024, 2025
Most wins without All-Time Favourite Artiste award (Only incld. artists who have won in the past 10 years)	Pan Lingling	6 wins	1994, 1997, 1998, 2000, 2018, 2019
Most consecutive wins without All-Time Favourite Artiste award (Only incld. artists who have won in the past 10 years)	Chantalle Ng	5 wins	2022, 2023, 2024, 2025, 2026
Longest gap between wins	Chen Xiuhuan	25 years	1994—2019
Most nominations with All-Time Favourite Artiste award	Yvonne Lim	19 nominations	1998, 1999, 2000, 2001, 2002, 2003, 2004, 2005, 2006, 2007, 2009, 2010, 2011, 2012, 2013, 2014, 2021, 2022, 2024
Most nominations without All-Time Favourite Artiste award	Pan Lingling	27 nominations	1994, 1995, 1997, 1998, 2000, 2001, 2002, 2003, 2004, 2005, 2006, 2007, 2009, 2010, 2011, 2012, 2013, 2014, 2016, 2017, 2018, 2019, 2021, 2022, 2023, 2024, 2025
Most consecutive nominations with All-Time Favourite Artiste award	Yvonne Lim	16 nominations	1998, 1999, 2000, 2001, 2002, 2003, 2004, 2005, 2006, 2007, 2009, 2010, 2011, 2012, 2013, 2014
Most consecutive nominations without All-Time Favourite Artiste award	Hong Huifang	16 nominations	2007, 2009, 2010, 2011, 2012, 2013, 2014, 2015, 2016, 2017, 2018, 2019, 2021, 2022, 2023, 2024
Most nominations before first award	Hong Huifang	12 nominations	Won first award (13th nomination) in 2019
Most nominations without a win	Patricia Mok	14 nominations	1998, 1999, 2000, 2001, 2002, 2003, 2004, 2005, 2006, 2007, 2009, 2024, 2025, 2026
Most nominations without a win	Priscelia Chan	14 nominations	2003, 2004, 2006, 2007, 2010, 2011, 2012, 2013, 2015, 2017, 2022, 2023, 2025, 2026
Longest gap between nominations	Chen Xiuhuan	25 years	1994—2019
Longest gap between nominations	Evelyn Tan	25 years	1999—2024
Won Best Newcomer and Top 10 Most Popular Female Artistes or Most Popular Rising Stars in the same year	Fann Wong	4 artistes	1995
Won Best Newcomer and Top 10 Most Popular Female Artistes or Most Popular Rising Stars in the same year	Evelyn Tan	4 artistes	1998
Won Best Newcomer and Top 10 Most Popular Female Artistes or Most Popular Rising Stars in the same year	Fiona Xie	4 artistes	2001
Won Best Newcomer and Top 10 Most Popular Female Artistes or Most Popular Rising Stars in the same year	Joanne Peh	4 artistes	2004
