= Carole Lin =

Singaporean actress (born 1973)

- Born: 23 February 1973 (age 53); Singapore
- Other name: Lin Xiaopei
- Education: Singapore Polytechnic
- Occupation: Actress
- Years active: 1995−2013
- Spouses: Zheng Jinming (m. 1999; div. 2002) Bertrand Gouge (m. 2008; div. 2009) David Lim (m. 2014)
- Children: 1
- Awards: Star Awards 1997 : Best Actress
- Modeling information
- Height: 1.71 m (5 ft 7 1/2 in)

Chinese name
- Traditional Chinese: 林曉佩
- Simplified Chinese: 林晓佩
- Hanyu Pinyin: Lín Xiǎopèi

Carole Lin (born 23 February 1973) is a Singaporean actress. Lin was a full-time Mediacorp artiste from 1995 to 2009. She won the Star Awards for Best Actress in 1997 for her role in The Price of Peace.

== Early life and career ==
Lin used to do motorcycling, bungee jumping and parachuting.

Lin was a waitress at a steak restaurant at Bukit Timah when she first started work. Then 16, she earned S$800 monthly and worked for about three months before enrolling into Singapore Polytechnic to study biotechnology. After graduating, she became a flight attendant at the age of 19 and later began modelling. Two years later, Lin joined MediaCorp after taking part in 1995 Star Search Singapore. She shot to fame for her role in The Price of Peace and won the Best Actress award at the Star Awards 1997. Her controversial scene of being stripped and humiliated in a busy street by her husband in the television series was named one of the "Top 5 Most Memorable Scenes" at the Star Awards 2007 anniversary special. She left MediaCorp in 2009 after her second marriage and moved abroad.

== Personal life ==
Lin was married in 1999 before it ended in divorce in 2002. In June 2008, she married aeronautical engineer, Bertrand Gouge, at a chateau in France. They divorced in November 2009. In 2014, Lin married for the third time to American-born Korean chiropractor David Lim and gave birth to her first child, Brooklyn, on 19 August 2015 at the age of 42. She currently works as a creative consultant for a chiropractic clinic.

== Filmography ==
- The Journey: A Voyage (2013) as Huang Zhenniang
- I'm in Charge (2013) as Lin Xiufen
- My Buddy (2009) as Chen Meijin ("US Dollar")
- Rhythm Of Life (2008)
- The Golden Path (2007)
- Metamorphosis (2007) as Melinda Guan Xiu Qing
- Making Miracles (2007) as Yang Zhihua
- A New Life (2005) as Zhang Zhenzhu
- Zero to Hero (2005) as Ah Car's mother
- My Love, My Home (2004)
- Man at Forty (2004) as Fried Chicken
- Springs of Life (2003)
- Fantasy 星梦情真 (2002)
- Health Matters 一切由慎开始 之《糖衣苦果》 (2002) as Lilian
- Wok Of Life II 春到人间 (2002)
- A War Diary 战争日记 (English drama) (2001)
- The Hotel (2001)
- The Reunion (2001)
- Bukit Ho Swee (2001)
- My Home Affairs 家事 (2000)
- Hainan Kopi Tales 琼园咖啡香 (2000)
- Lost Soul 另类佳人 (1999) as Li Bijiao
- From the Medical Files 2 医生档案2 (1999) as Lin Biqi
- Act 235 刑事235 (1998) as Nie Keer
- From The Medical Files 医生档案 (1998)
- A Piece Of Sky 锁不住的天空 (1998)
- The Price of Peace 和平的代价 (1997) as Wang Qiumei
- Roses, Complete With Thorns 单身女郎 (1997)
- Tofu Street (1996)
- The Unbroken Cycle 解连环 (1996)
- Marriage, Collars and Sense 5C 老公 (1996)
- Diary Of A Teacher 老师的日记 (1996)
- Brave New World 新阿郎 (1996)
- Wild Orchids 再见莹光兰 (1996)
- Tales Of The Third Kind 第三类剧场 (1995)

== Awards and nominations ==
Year	Award	Category	Nominated work	Result
1997	Star Awards	Top 10 Most Popular Female Artistes	—N/a	Nominated
1997	Star Awards	Best Actress	The Price of Peace	Won
2003	Star Awards	Best Supporting Actress	Springs of Life	Nominated
2005	Star Awards	Best Supporting Actress	Zero to Hero	Nominated
