= Three Women and A Half =

Three Women and A Half 三个半女人 is a top-rated drama series in Singapore filmed by Matrix Vision and screened on MediaCorp TV Channel 8 in 2001. It starred Huang Wenyong, Aileen Tan, Huang Biren, Lin Meijiao and Vivian Lai. The plot mainly revolves around three office ladies Jane, Monica and Rachel competing with one another in an advertising firm in a bid to climb the corporate ladder.

== Accolades ==
Organisation	Year	Award	Nominee	Result	Ref
Star Awards	2001	Best Actress	Aileen Tan	Won	
Star Awards	2001	Best Actress	Huang Biren	Nominated	
Star Awards	2001	Best Supporting Actress	Lin Meijiao	Nominated	
Star Awards	2001	Best Supporting Actor	Nick Shen	Nominated	
Star Awards	2001	Best Supporting Actor	Rayson Tan	Nominated	
Star Awards	2001	Best Actor	Huang Wenyong	Nominated	
Star Awards	2001	Best Drama Serial	—	Won	

Preceded by Hainan Kopi Tales; 2000	Star Awards for Best Drama Serial; Three Women and A Half; 2001	Succeeded by Beautiful Connection; 2002
