= Yan Bingliang =

Yan Bingliang may refer to:

- Yan Bingliang (actor) (fl. 1984-present), Singaporean actor
- Yan Bingliang (footballer) (born 2000), Chinese footballer
