= Nan Chiau High School =

- 南僑中學; Sekolah Tinggi Nan Chiau

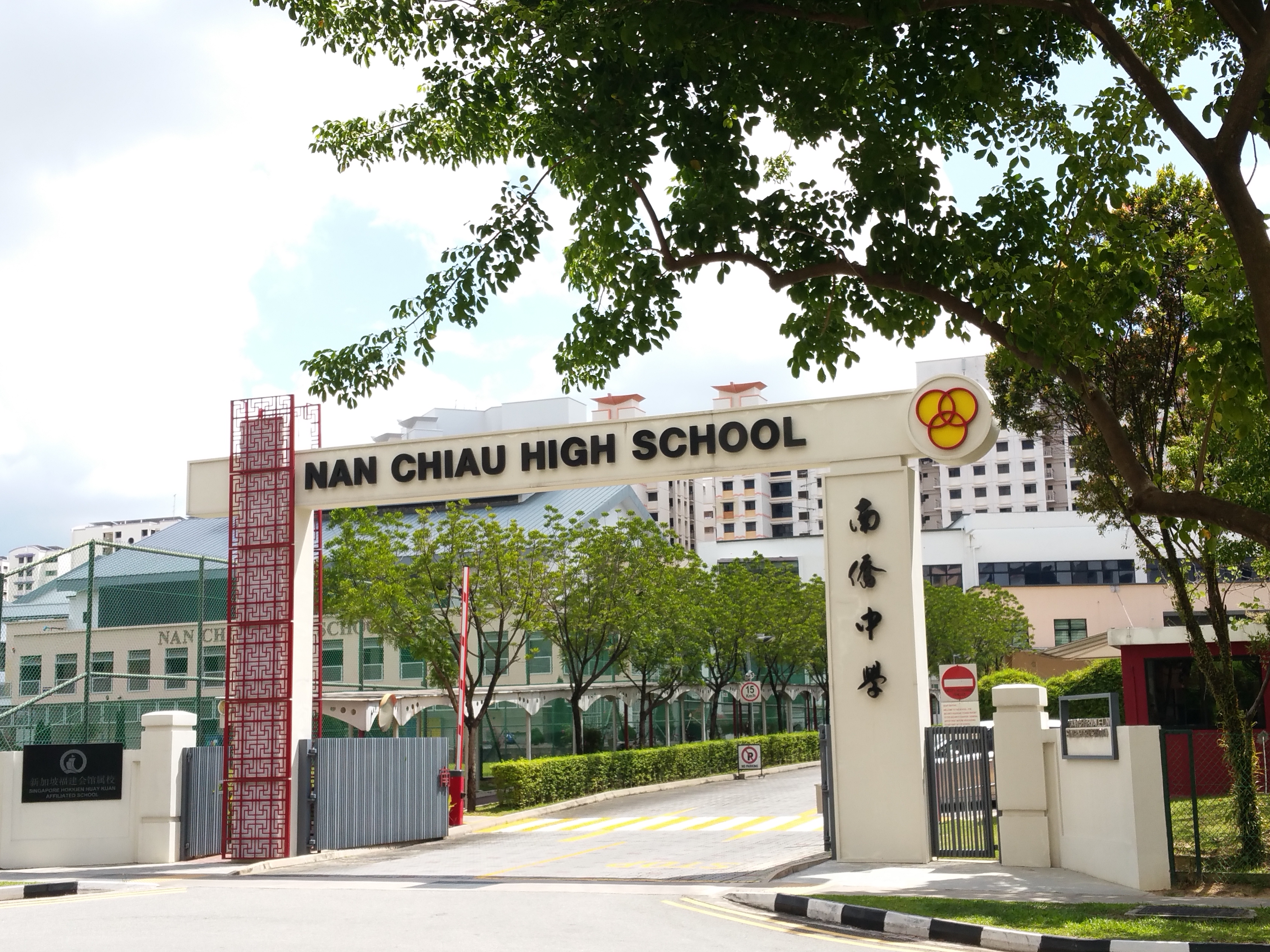

Location
- 20 Anchorvale Link, Singapore 545079; Singapore; 1.388713°N 103.890282°E

Information
- School type: Government-aided, Co-educational, Special Assistance Plan (SAP)
- Motto: Sincerity & Perseverance (诚以待人、毅以处事)
- Established: 8 March 1947; 79 years ago
- Founder: Tan Kah Kee
- Session: Single Session
- School code: 7104
- Principal: Ler Jia Luen
- Enrolment: approx. 1400
- Colour: Red Yellow Blue White
- Guiding Principle: 有教无类 (egalitarian education)
- Mission: To broaden the minds of NCzens, nurturing bicultural learners who lead, serve and inspire 开启多元智慧，使其具备双文化视野、领导素质、服务精神与激励他人之能力。
- Vision: A Distinctive Institution of World-Ready Thinkers and Leaders 独树一帜的学府，面向世界的领袖
- Philosophy: 力求卓越 (Aspire to Excel)
- Website: www.nanchiauhigh.moe.edu.sg

Nan Chiau High School (NCHS) (traditional Chinese: 南僑中學; simplified Chinese: 南侨中学; pinyin: Nánqiáo Zhōngxué; Wade–Giles: Nan^{²}Ch'iao^{²} Chung^{¹}hsüeh^{²}) is a co-educational government-aided institution in Sengkang, Singapore affiliated to the Singapore Hokkien Huay Kuan. It offers the G3 course only, for secondary education.

Founded in 1947, the institution operates under the Special Assistance Plan (SAP), with the mission to nurture bilingual and bi-cultural scholars who are highly knowledgeable in the Chinese language and culture. Affirmed as the North Zone Centre of Excellence for Chinese Language, the institution is known for its strong Chinese foundation in terms of teaching of the language and promulgation of the heritage and culture, which are not confined to the classrooms.

To date, Nan Chiau High has nurtured three President's Scholars, and is currently one of Singapore's leading schools for Infocomm Technology. It is also one of the joint organisers of the National Secondary School Chinese Creative Writing Competition.

== History ==
=== Nan Chiau Teachers' Training College (1941–1947) ===
Nan Chiau High School was initially established as Nan Chiau Teachers' Training College in 1941 by Mr Tan Kah Kee, a Chinese businessman, community leader and philanthropist, to support the local education needs. The initial schooling site was incorporated from mansions donated by Mr Lee Kong Chian, on a plot of land in River Valley. The campus was used as the base and training barracks for Dalforce, a Chinese volunteers' army formed promptly before the Japanese invasion in 1942.

=== Nan Chiau Girls High School (1947–1984) ===
After the war, the demand for education rose, especially for high school education. There was also a rising need to cater to students enrolled in the elementary schools affiliated to the Singapore Hokkien Huay Kuan. Thus, Nan Chiau Teachers' Training College was converted into a girls' high school on 8 March 1947, featuring a primary school section. Mr Yang Zhen Li was the first principal of the institution, which had an initial student enrolment of 900 students. A female hostel was also built in the 1950s. By the 1960s, Nan Chiau Girls' High had gained reputation as one of the state's top high schools. In 1965, the Singapore Hokkien Huay Kuan spent 2 million dollars to rebuild Nan Chiau Girl's High School to meet the needs of an increased student enrolment. During the re-construction, the high school section conducted lessons at a temporary campus at Guillemard Road, while the primary school section continued lessons at the unaffected classroom blocks of the Kim Yam Road campus. The new campus was officially opened by then Minister for Education Mr. Ong Pang Boon, on 8 March 1969.

In 1974, the student population of the institution went up to 2700, the highest in the school's history, with 48 classes in the six-year high-school section and 24 classes at the primary-school section. Two-year pre-university classes were also offered to top students alongside senior high classes, with good GCE Advanced Level examination results yearly. To cope with the increased enrolment, additional 300 thousand dollars was spent for constructing the 5th storey of the school building.

In 1978, Nan Chiau Girls' High was initially included in the list of 12 newly accorded Special Assistance Plan schools. However, with the concern from the Ministry of Education over the surplus of school places that might hinder the success of the scheme, the number of SAP schools were amended to nine, which excluded Nan Chiau Girl's High School. In 1980, the institution ceased senior high and pre-university classes following the changes to the education system, and adopted English as its language medium. As student enrolment started to decline, the institution went co-educational in 1984 with the enrolment of male students, and was renamed "Nan Chiau High School"

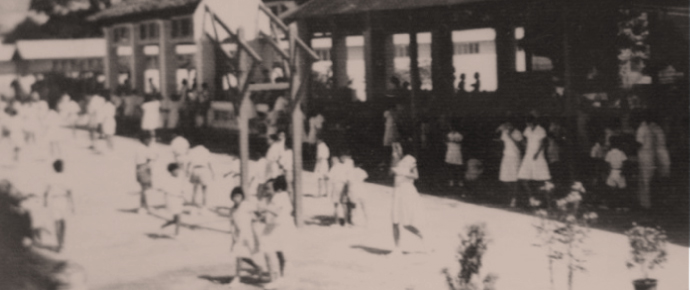
A shot of the school campus of Nan Chiau Girls' High School in 1947.

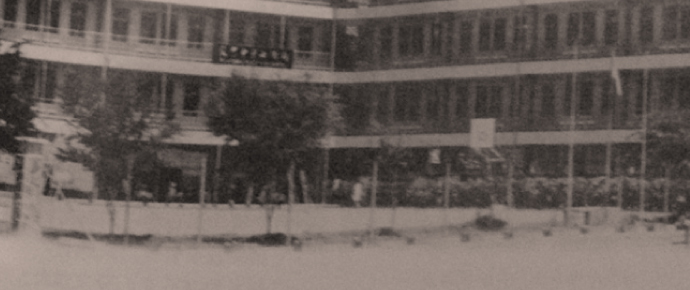
Former Nan Chiau Girls' High School's temporary campus at Guillemard Road, back in 1965 during the rebuilding of the Kim Yam Road campus.

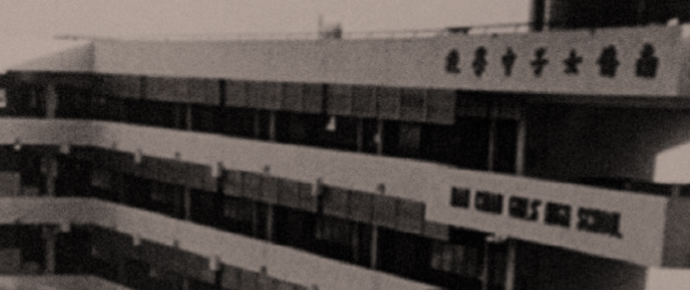
A picture of former Nan Chiau Girls' High's campus upon its completion in 1969.

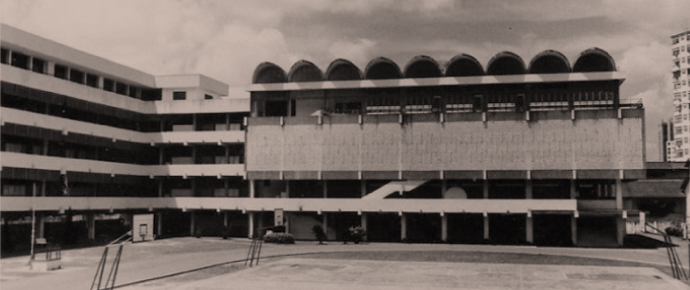
The exterior view of the school hall of Nan Chiau Girls' High School Kim Yam Road Campus back in 1976.

=== Relocation to Sengkang ===
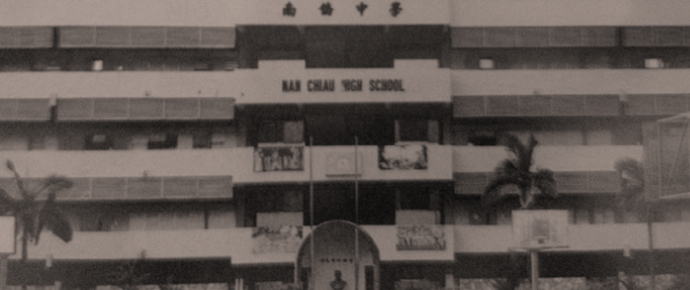
A picture of the main building of Nan Chiau High School's former Kim Yam Road campus in 1990.

In the 1990s, calls for Nan Chiau High to consider attaining independent status surfaced amidst shrinking student population, stating of the institution's ample human and financial backing along with its affiliation with several Special Assistance Plan primary schools, under the auspices of Singapore Hokkien Huay Kuan. Nearing the end of the decade, the declining student population became more significant and the institution was on the verge of permanent closure. In 2000, Nan Chiau High School relocated to Sengkang New Town under an agreement with the Singapore Land Authority. The primary section separated to form Nan Chiau Primary School and relocated to 50 Anchorvale Link. That year, Nan Chiau High School was also ranked the top value-added school in the Ministry of Education's 1999 ranking of Special/Express schools in Singapore.

=== Attainment of SAP status ===
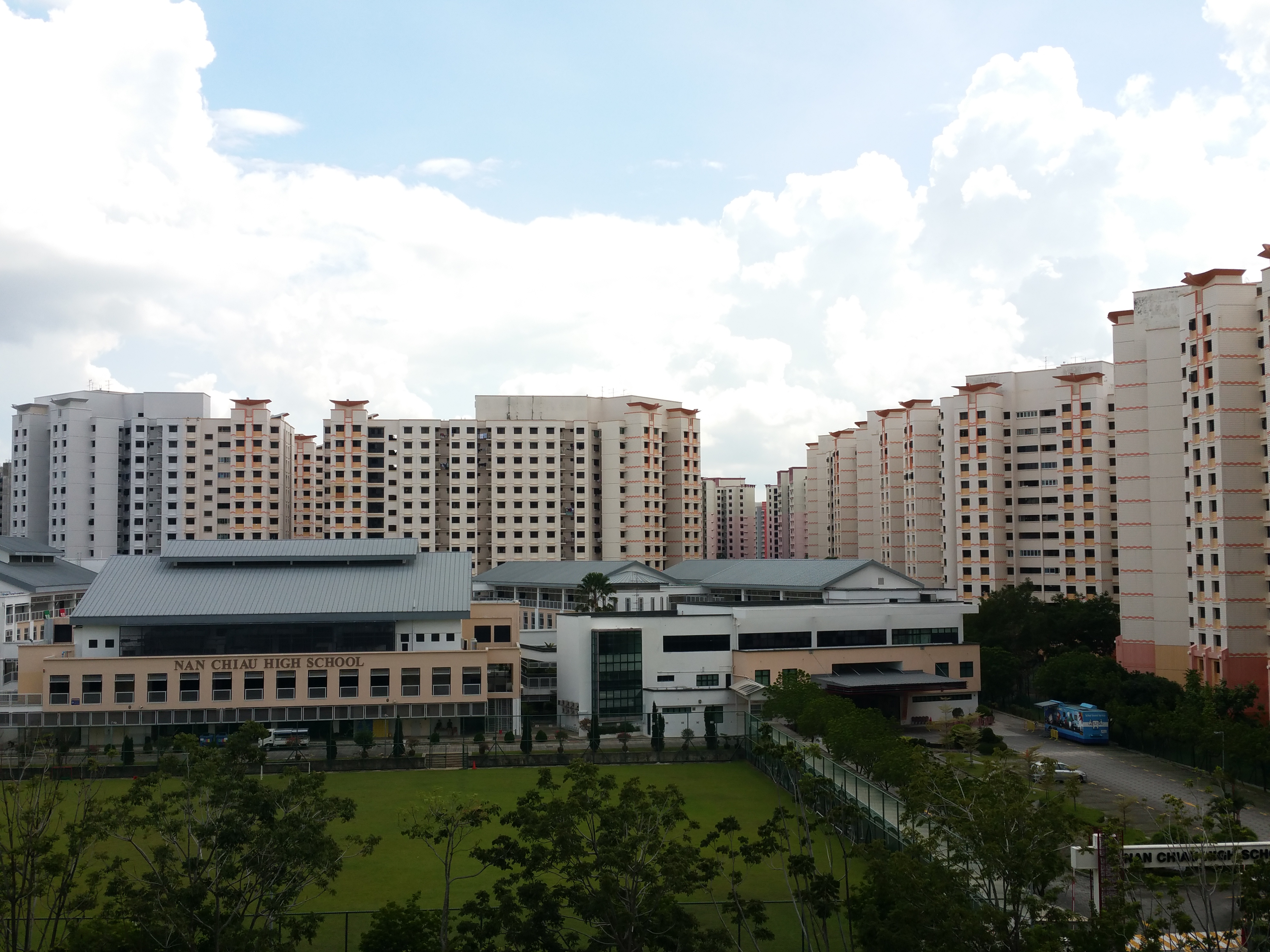
An aerial view of Nan Chiau High School campus taken in 2015

In November 2010, Nan Chiau High School was formally recognised by the Ministry of Education to be included as the 11th Special Assistance Plan (SAP) school, with effect from 2012. The news was given by minister of education Dr Ng Eng Hen during his opening address at the Singapore Hokkien Festival, and was welcomed by numerous school alumni and educators, noting that the institution could finally fulfil its mission to preserve and advocate the Chinese heritage and culture with more support from the government. In commemoration, a public musical performance was staged at Nanyang Polytechnic on 23 June 2012. Themed "Equilibrium", the musical was the first public performance in the institution's history to have the production and songs composed entirely by teachers and students.

On 29 December 2013, a home-coming event was held at the former Nan Chiau High School campus at 46 Kim Yam Road, which thousands of alumni, former and present principals, teachers and staff of the institution gathered at the former school hall in a brunch buffet setting. The event was held before the official relaunch of the site of the former campus as a commercial development of offices, schools and F&B establishments.

In March 2015, Nan Chiau High School celebrated its 68th anniversary. Themed "Appreciating our Past, Inspiring the Future", the event was graced by Guest-of-Honour, Minister for Defence, Dr Ng Eng Hen, which saw the school and the community coming together to mark the occasion with a celebration of SG50, the outstanding achievements of the students, as well as the completion of the school's upgrading works which cost 2.67 million dollars. The school upgrading works were co-funded by the Singapore Hokkien Huay Kuan, comprising a revamp of the canteen and the air-conditioned library, as well as the construction of the park square and a new 300-seat auditorium.

=== 70th anniversary ===
Nan Chiau High School commemorated its 70th anniversary in 2017 along with Nan Chiau Primary School (its former ancillary primary section before 2001). On 27 January 2017, a total of 3,398 staff and students of both institutions came together to craft knots on a triple-ring with red strings, which resembles the school logo. The event set a national record for the most people making knotted rings together. A dedicated maker-space was also opened on 10 March 2017. Named The Nest, the tools-equipped space allow students to design, construct or modify meaningful or handy items in their own accord.

On 1 August 2017, Nan Chiau High was featured in an episode of Channel 8's "When The Bell Rings" documentary series. This eight episode documentary series featured eight Special Assistance Plan (SAP) Schools in Singapore, and told stories of their transformation through the times. The episode on Nan Chiau High was the fourth episode to be aired.

In January 2018, Nan Chiau High School became one of the first 62 institutions in Singapore to pilot the Singapore Student Learning Space (SLS), a nationwide online learning portal developed jointly by the Ministry of Education and GovTech. The SLS empower students to conduct self-directed learning through a variety of interactive resources, and assist teachers in designing meaning learning experiences that promote critical thinking and teamwork among students.

=== Introduction of Language Elective Programme (LEP) ===
On 28 May 2019, Minister of Education Ong Ye Kung announced that Nan Chiau High School will offer two year Chinese Language Elective Programme (C-LEP, or 语特 in Chinese) at upper secondary level along with nine other selected institutions from 2020. First introduced in 1990 at the junior college level, the LEP programme aims to nurture students who excel in mother tongue languages through the study of literature and participating in cultural activities, and has been highly regarded for nurturing effectively bi-cultural and bilingual leaders across industries.

== Principals ==
Name of Principal	Native Name	Years served
Yang Zhenli	杨振礼	1947 - 1950
Qiu Rentuan	邱仁端	1951 - 1960
Lin Fanglan	林芳兰	1961 - 1968
Kau Ah Suo	高亚思	1969 - 1988
Su Wei Cher	苏伟哲	1989 - 1997
Ng Lee Huat	黄利发	1998 - 2004
Yeo Kuerk Heng	杨昱贤	2004
Ong Kian Choon	王建春	2004 - 2010
Tan Yee Kan	陈毅刚	2010 - 2018
Siau Fong Fui	萧芳辉	2019 - 2022
Ler Jia Luen	吕佳伦	2023 -

== School identity and culture ==
Nan Chiau High shares its heritage with several other institutions in Singapore with the same founder. The name of the institution is a direct phonic translation of the term "南僑" in Chinese which meant the Overseas Chinese of the Southeast Asian region (南洋華僑), particularly the Malayan Peninsula. The name of the institution is a reflection of its mission to empower youths through education, shared along with several other institutions which share the same identity, such as The Chinese High School (presently Hwa Chong Institution) as well as Nanyang Girls' High School.

=== Motto ===
Nan Chiau High School's motto, Sincerity & Perseverance (誠·毅), is set after the philosophy of its founder, Tan Kah Kee. The motto is also shared by all Hokkien Huay Kuan schools, as well as several institutions in mainland China with the same founder, such as Xiamen Jimei Middle School of Fujian, Jimei University & Xiamen University.

- "Sincerity" or 誠, meant to be truthful to self and others
- "Perseverance" or 毅, meant the dedication and persistence in the pursuit of excellence in the face of challenges.

=== Crest ===
Original school crest of Nan Chiau Girl's High School in 1982. The interlocking rings of the original school crest are preserved in the current school crest.

The school crest of Nan Chiau High School is represented by three interlocking rings, which symbolises its students' moral, physical and intellectual development.

The red colour of the rings depicts a persevering spirit in the pursuit of a bright and promising future, as represented by the golden background.

The heart shape in the centre of the overlapping rings symbolizes care and concern for the total welfare of the pupils in a student-oriented system.

=== Anthem ===
Nan Chiau High School keeps its original school anthem in Mandarin. The anthem was written by Ms Lin Zhen Ru, and moderated by Professor Zhao Xingdao (Mr.) in the early 1950s. The same anthem is shared with Nan Chiau Primary School, which was formerly its ancillary primary school before 2001.

=== Attire and appearance ===
Nan Chiau High School's uniform is closely linked to its heritage as a former traditional Chinese school. Originally, the school uniform was in full white with the Chinese name of the school sewed on the right chest level of the blouse, much similar to other institutions with Chinese heritage. Students in the senior high and pre-university section wore white shirts with dark coloured skirts, before the pre-university classes were made mandatory to be taught at junior colleges, a policy declared by the ministry of education in 1979. Nearing the 1990s, the school uniform was switched to be worn with dark coloured school pants or skirt, with dark coloured school tag was sewed on the left side of the shirt. The uniform was redesigned as an effort to preserve the school's identity along with the relocation of the campus in 2000, which integrated the original heritage of the uniform in the 1960s and the 1990s.

Currently, male students wear white studded shirts with traditional Chinese characters of the school name on it in red. Navy blue shorts are worn for years one and two, and long pants for upper secondary levels. The six metal buttons bearing the school name is sewed onto the shirt as a modification to the traditional design adopted by other traditional Chinese schools, where rings were used to secure the buttons. Female students wear white blouses bearing the traditional Chinese characters of the school name on it in red, with navy blue pleated skirts. During Assemblies and important functions, every student will wear a red-coloured school tie.

=== Discipline ===
Nan Chiau High School is known for its strict regulations and discipline, with minimal tolerance of misbehaviour by its students. In 2004 the school gained attention for its disciplinary action on a student over misconduct, which was deemed overly harsh. This came despite the backing of many alumni, educators and parents, who claimed that the action taken was justified.

== Campus ==
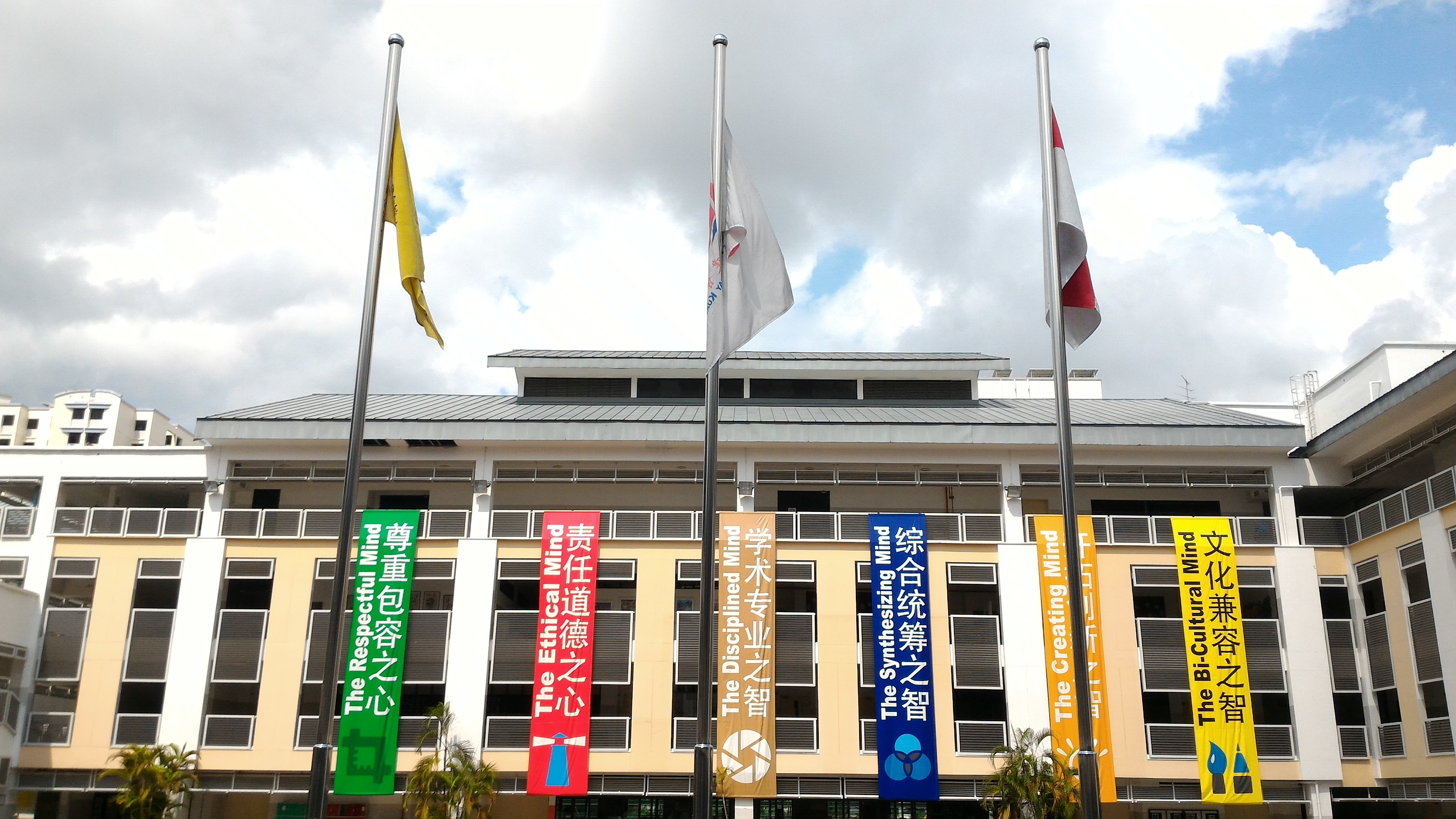
The Aesthetics Block of Nan Chiau High School's campus, viewed across the Quadrangle.

Nan Chiau High School's current campus covers 7.6 acres of land off Sengkang East Avenue, constructed under the School Management Model granted by the Ministry of Education in 2000. The campus was officially declared open by then Minister for Education and Second Minister for Defence Mr. Teo Chee Hean on 8 March 2003. The five-storey building cluster consists of an Administrative Block, a Science & Research Block, an Aesthetics block, and three classroom blocks.

The Kong Chian Hall (main hall of Nan Chiau High School) was named after the school's co-founder, Mr Lee Kong Chian. The air-conditioned hall is the common venue for weekly assemblies and dialogue sessions, as well as hosting competitions and symposiums such as the National Secondary School Chinese Creative Writing Competition and the NYP-YTSS-NCHS Science Research Symposium.

The 300-seat auditorium, housed at the fourth level of the aesthetics block, was converted from an Air Rifle Shooting Range under the two-year school upgrading project in 2012 funded by the school management and Singapore Hokkien Huay Kuan. The auditorium provides a venue for performances apart from the main hall, as well as conducting sharing talks and academic lectures.

The revamped library, opened in 2013, features dedicated study areas, a small platform to hold forums and press conferences, as well as three discussion rooms available for student-teacher consultations, projects and group studies. The Nest, a dedicated maker-space which was opened in March 2017, allows students to design, construct or modify meaningful or handy items with specialised tools in the lab, and supports the school's Science, Technology, Engineering and Mathematics Applied Learning Programme (STEM ALP).

As a North Zone Centre of Excellence for Chinese Language, Nan Chiau High School features two language labs catering for enhanced Chinese programmes and activities. The labs are currently used to host the Young Writer's Programme for students of six schools in the North 4 Cluster, as well as the school's Chinese calligraphy society.

Other facilities in NCHS include a gymnasium, an indoor sports hall, a central plaza, an open-concept canteen, an eco-garden and a 1.3 acres field.

== Academic details and curriculum ==
=== O Level Express Course ===
As a Special Assistance Plan (SAP) school, Nan Chiau High School offers the four-year Express course which leads up to the Singapore-Cambridge GCE Ordinary Level national examination, complemented by cultural intelligence and global exchange programmes focusing on cultural awareness and global engagement. Students also participate in courses that cover cultural topics and life skills alongside the academic curriculum.

All NCHS students expect a 2-week based timetable, with supplementary lessons for four days allocated to individual subjects according to their academic needs (with the exception for Wednesdays).

A common educational procedure for the four-year Express course, subject combination streaming for NCHS students is carried out at Secondary Two level. Usually, nine classes (A to I) will be allocated per cohort for upper secondary levels, with 2 classes allocated for students taking 3 pure science subjects (commonly known as "Triple-Science" combinations).

Nan Chiau High School has consistently achieved strong academic and non-academic results. A Band 1 school since 2006, the school’s students have performed well in both the GCE 'O' Level academic subjects and Co-Curricular Activities (CCAs). In 2014, students from Nan Chiau High School achieved a Mean Score of 10.6 in the GCE 'O' Level examinations (based on L1R5 grading), with over 90% of students receiving an A1 grading for their CCA involvement.

=== SAP Flagship Programme (Cultural Intelligence) ===
The SAP Flagship Programme is an integral component of Nan Chiau High's curriculum as a Special Assistance Plan (SAP) school. It incorporates Howard Gardner’s concept of the "Five Minds for the Future" (Disciplined Mind, Synthesizing Mind, Ethical Mind, Creating Mind, Respectful Mind), along with a sixth element, the "Bi-cultural Mind."

The flagship programme develops students' interest in learning about eastern and western cultures by providing them with opportunities to integrate both cultures and to be immersed in other cultures, and to have in-depth understanding of the essence of both the east and the west, thus preparing students to become inclusive talents who are effectively bilingual and able to make strong and meaningful connections with the world. The four-year flagship programme is mainly made up of two segments, namely 'Broad-Base Curriculum' and 'Peaks of Excellence', which include cultural intelligence and life education to groom students to be world-ready. The 'Broad-Base Curriculum' spans the first year of the students' admission, with the introduction to Chinese culture and history, the history of Chinese immigrants and understanding diversity of local cultures. This is inculcated through various platforms such as cultural intelligence forums, bi-cultural camps, and Chinese lyrics competitions, as well as local and regional learning journeys.

The 'Peaks of Excellence' curriculum is continuous with the 'Broad-Base Curriculum', with more elaborate programmes that cater to students' talent development. For instance, the Young Writers Programme, which is open to students who are interested in writing, has lessons conducted by various renowned Chinese language essayists in the region to expose and familiarise students to different forms of writing, and encourage them to appreciate different forms of written work. Students also have opportunities to attend cultural symposiums, national and international bi-cultural forums, research on contemporary issues, and embark on refined overseas immersions to strengthen their world and cultural views under the Global Classroom Programme.

=== Life Education Programme ===
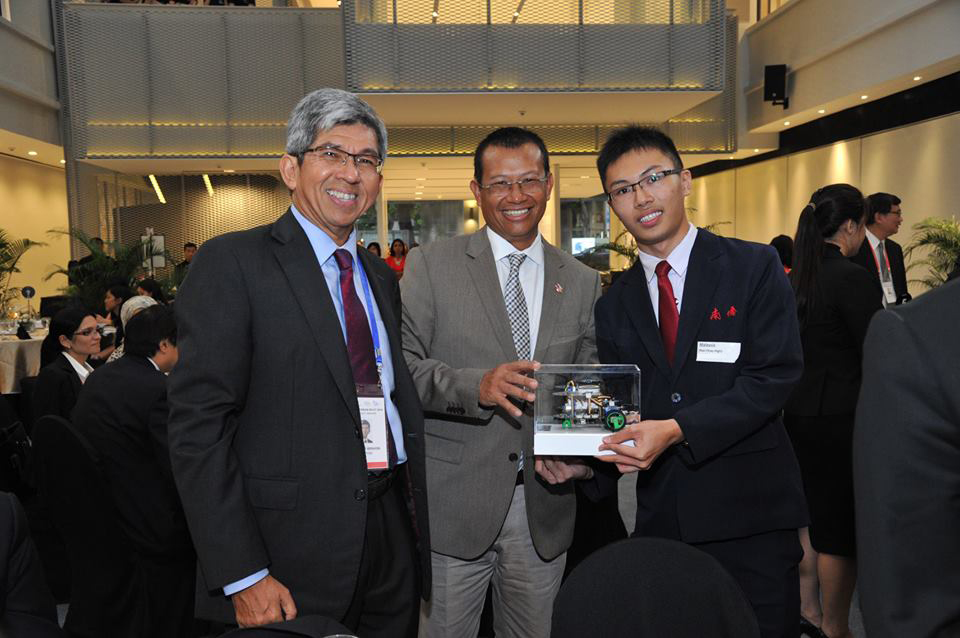
A student representative presenting their Arduino Shieldbot creation to visiting Malaysian Minister during a gift presentation ceremony at imbX Ministerial Forum in 2014.

Apart from development of cultural intelligence, life skills are also incorporated into the curriculum to prepare students for the future, by assisting students in the acquisition of various life skills that will be useful as they become part of the 21st century workforce. The Learning for Life Programme (LLP) provides a unique cognitive-aesthetic domain of learning through drama, public speaking, debate, puppetry and creative Chinese lyrical composition, to strengthen self-expression and nurtures aesthetics appreciation in students, as well as to allow them to learn and embrace cultural diversity.

In the Science, Technology, Engineering and Mathematics Applied Learning Programme (STEM ALP), students explore using Arduino Micro-controller in health related science and technology. Students also acquire science research skills to deepen their proficiency in Sciences.

==== Collaboration with the Singapore University of Technology and Design (SUTD) ====
On 16 February 2019, a new collaboration with Singapore University of Technology and Design (SUTD) was announced by Singapore Hokkien Huay Kuan, and was followed by a signing of Memorandum of Understanding. Students from Nan Chiau High School, as well as the other five institutions affiliated to Singapore Hokkien Huay Kuan, will benefit from corporate partnership through school-based programmes co-developed with SUTD. These programmes aim to inspire students to empower and embrace the developments in science, technology, engineering and mathematics (STEM), with focus in technology, design and innovation.

=== Enhanced Art Programme (EAP) ===
Since 2013, Nan Chiau High School is a certified education centre for the Enhanced Art Programme (EAP) for students who have keen interest in pursuing arts and design. Introduced in 2011 by the Ministry of Education, the two-year programme provide an enriched learning environment for Secondary 3 and 4 students who are inclined towards Art, as a complementary to the Art Elective Programme (AEP). Enrichment programmes such as the Aesthetics Week, Student-Initiated Project in Art and Lower Secondary Integrated Art Modules are also integrated for deepened understanding and application opportunities for the art students.

=== Exchange Programmes (Global Classroom Programme) ===
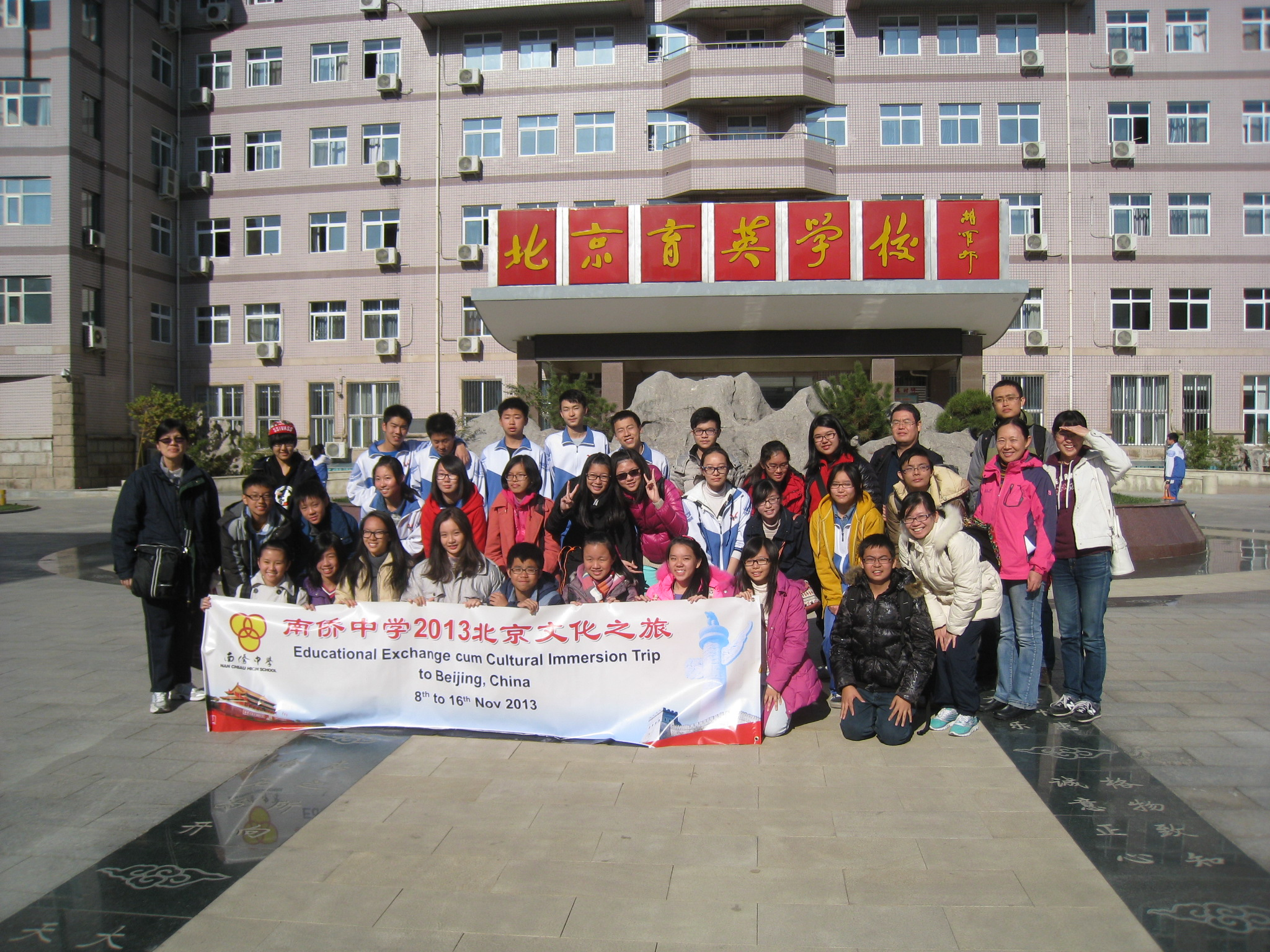
A batch of students during an annual immersion trip to Beijing Yuying Middle School.

Nan Chiau High School has its overseas learning programme that offers all students an opportunity to go on subsidised learning trips to deepen their understanding on their academic subjects, perform community projects or involvement as part of the programmes within their Co-Curricular Activities (CCAs). Through this programme, opportunities are also infused for interaction with students, educators and subject specialists around the region and the globe. These included famous writers, entrepreneurs, and students from sister schools such as Ming-Dao High School of Taiwan & Sagano High School of Kyoto, Japan.

== Co-curricular activities ==
Nan Chiau High School offers a wide variety of extra-curricular activities, labelled Co-Curricular Activities (CCA) by the Ministry of Education, consisting of sports groups, uniformed groups, performing arts, clubs and societies. Since the school’s relocation to Sengkang in 2001, several CCAs have achieved notable results.

The school's National Cadet Corps (NCHSNCC) unit has been awarded the Gold unit award for 19 consecutive years and received the Distinction Unit Recognition (UR) Award in 2021. The National Police Cadet Corps (NPCC) unit has achieved the Gold Award for 11 consecutive years in the Unit Overall Proficiency Award (UOPA). The NCHS Red Cross Youth has received the Community Service Award (Gold) in 2010 and 2013, as well as the Excellence Unit Award (Gold) in 2011 and 2012. Established in 2011, the Scouts unit has won the National Patrol Camp Best Newcomer Award and the National Patrol Camp Overall Silver in 2013.

Nan Chiau High School's performing arts groups have received Certificates of Accomplishment and Distinction in the Singapore Youth Festival (SYF) Arts Presentation Assessment since 2012. In the 2007 SYF Central Judging, the Chinese Dance, String Orchestra, and Choir won Gold with Honour, while the Chinese Orchestra, Chinese LDDS, English LDDS, Contemporary Dance, and Wind Orchestra received Silver. In 2011, the Chinese Dance, Choir, and English LDDS earned Gold with Honour at the SYF Central Judging. These groups also participate in community performances, such as the FOCUS event held in 2016 at the Anchorvale Community Club.

The clubs and societies at Nan Chiau High School provide students with opportunities to develop a range of skills and interests. The NCHS Robotics Club has been the zonal champion of the DSTA-DSO East Zone Robotics Challenge since 2014 and has organized an annual competition for primary and secondary school students since 2009. The Multimedia Club received the Best School Award in the Canon Photo Marathon in 2014 and 2015.

=== NCHS Falcons ===
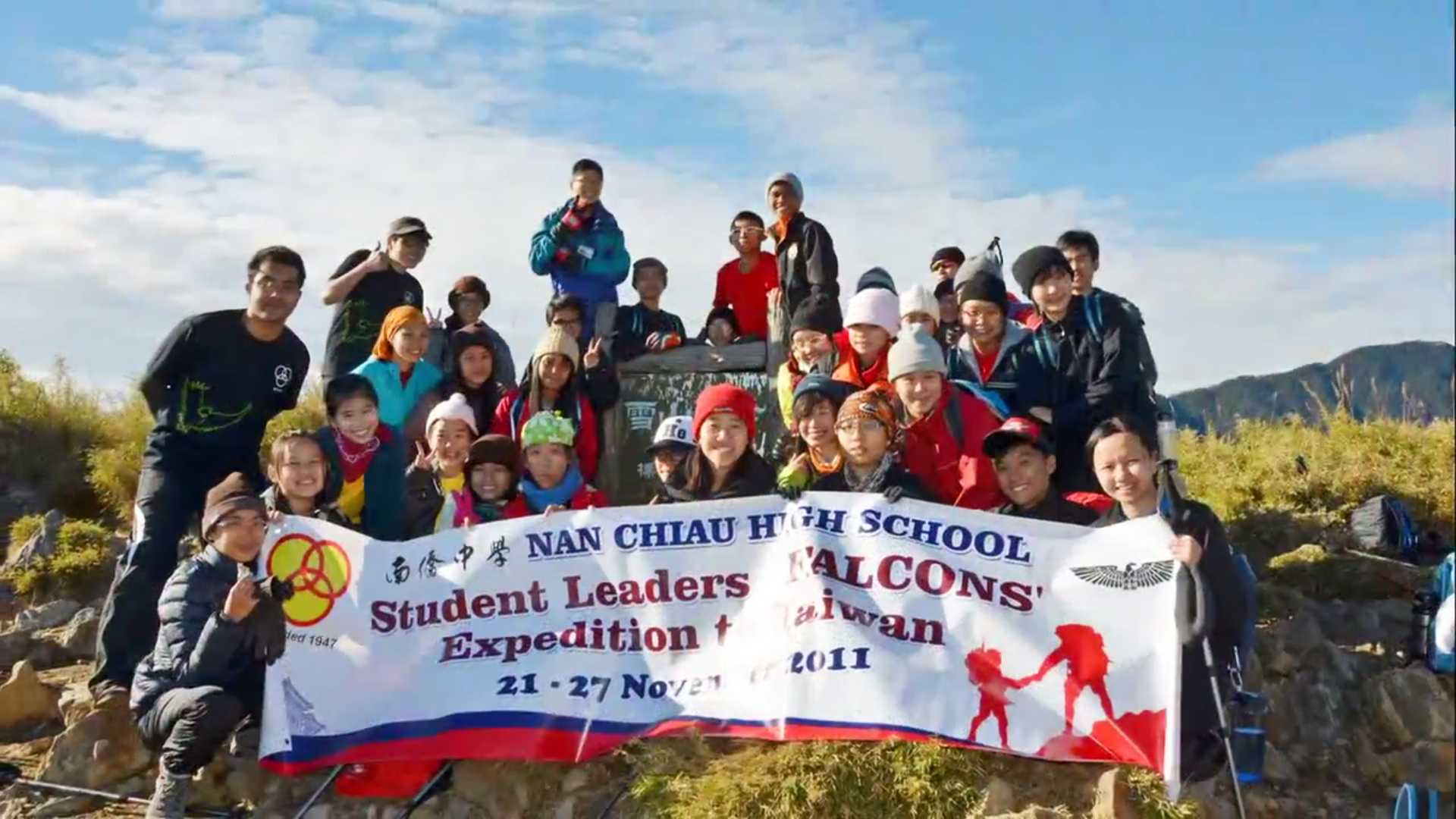
The NCHS FALCONS on leadership training at Xueshan in Taichung, Taiwan in November 2011

The NCHS Falcons is a voluntary student leadership team in Nan Chiau High School composed of able CCA leaders, taking responsibility of school leadership training and school-based events. The name "F.A.L.C.O.N.S." stands as an acronym for the team's cause, "Focused on Adding values to others, to Lead, build Character with ON-going learning to Serve". The annual events handled by NCHS Falcons include school camps as well as school-based leadership workshops for year one, two and three students.

== Community outreach ==
=== SHINES in Harmony ===
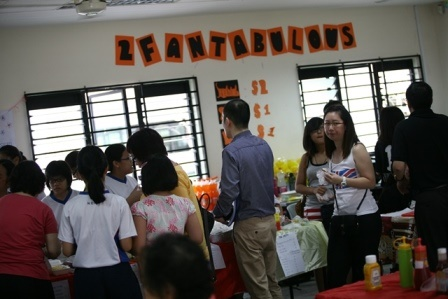
A student-operated food stall during Nan Chiau High School's annual SHINES in Harmony Carnival in 2012.

Since 2005, Nan Chiau High School organises the single day community fund raising event annually to raise funds for the community welfare organisations around the district such as the CDAC, REACH Family Service Centre. In recent years, the event have also raised funds for various social service agencies in Singapore, such as Animal Concerns Research and Education Society (ACRES) and the Singapore Cancer Society. The event is open to the public, which the students, alumni and the parents support group of the institution set up food and games booths around the campus, as well as put up performances for the community to engage for a good cause.

== Relation with other schools ==
=== Combined sports meet ===
Nan Chiau High School, Xinmin Secondary School & Yishun Town Secondary School (in 2017, only Nan Chiau High School and Xinmin Secondary School held combined sports meet) hold combined sports meets yearly since 2013 to give student athletes from the participating schools a platform to showcase their physical talent and also for the schools to unite to celebrate and enjoy. Apart from the inter-school competitions among students, parent-teacher races are also featured to engage the parents and school staff.

=== NCHS-NYP Science and Technology Research Programme ===
The NCHS-NYP Science and Technology Research Programme is a collaborated initiative between Nanyang Polytechnic and Nan Chiau High School for upper secondary levels with the aim of providing opportunities for capable science students to acquire science knowledge beyond academic syllabus, carry out research modules using contemporary technology, and interact with specialists in the relevant fields of Sciences and Information Technology. The research projects are presented in the form of an annual symposium hosted by Yishun Town Secondary and Nan Chiau High alternately, which serves as a platform for students involved to showcase their work to fellow schoolmates and counterparts from other schools.

== School alumni ==
Nan Chiau High School has an active alumni community, consisting of former students from both Nan Chiau High School and Nan Chiau Primary School, which were previously affiliated. Various alumni associations organise events and programmes that connect former students, while also working with the school committee to support the current students of both institutions.

=== Nan Chiau Alumni Association ===
Nan Chiau Alumni Association (NCAA) is the main alumni body of Nan Chiau High School and Nan Chiau Primary School. Formed on 12 January 1990 at the Kim Yam Road campus, the association works closely with the two institutions to preserve the traditional values of the schools while placing emphasis on the moral, physical, cognitive, social and aesthetic aspects of students' development. It also serves as a platform for all members from the Nan Chiau family to socialise and stay in contact with each other. With the relocation and separation of Nan Chiau High School with the ancillary primary school section in December 2000, NCAA presently functions at both Nan Chiau Primary School and Nan Chiau High School. In 2001, the NCAA started the Weekend Activities Program at Nan Chiau Primary School to complement the school curriculum, and is highly successful for providing a holistic education for the primary school pupils.

=== Youth of Nan Chiau ===
It the youth wing of the Nan Chiau Alumni Association that comprises the youth graduates from Nan Chiau High. The youth wing plays a supportive role alongside the NCAA during events, gatherings when need arises. The youth wing also organizes activities for students of Nan Chiau High and Nan Chiau Primary on an ad-hoc basis.

=== Nan Chiau Youth Mentors ===
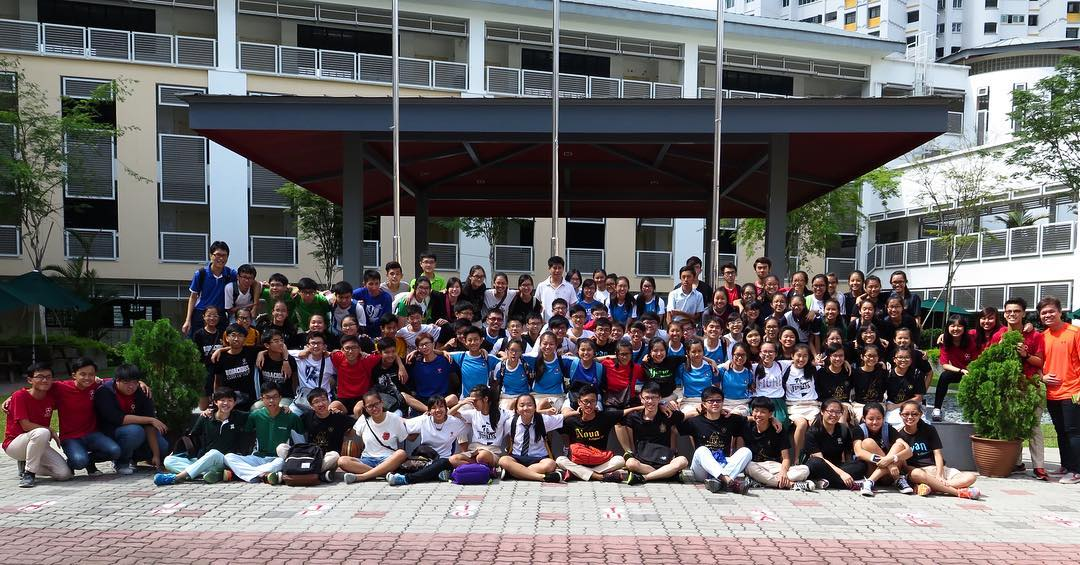
Group photo of the 2015–16 batch of Nan Chiau Youth Mentors (NCYM)

The Nan Chiau Youth Mentors (NCYM) consists of young graduates from Nan Chiau High School who have a passion of providing assistance to the juniors within the scope of a holistic education. The members of team works alongside the school to provide assistance and sharing for upper secondary levels preparing for national examinations, as well as individual mentorship of their former Co-curricular Activities (CCAs).

== Notable alumni ==
=== Medicine and healthcare ===
- Lim Woan Huah: President's Scholar, 1984; Specialist, Paediatric Medicine

=== Education and politics ===
- Peh Chin Hua: Former Member of Parliament, Jalan Besar Group Representation Constituency (1988–2001); Executive Chairman, White Group (Singapore); Former Executive Chairman (1992–2005), Dragon Land Limited.
- Chan Soo Sen: Former Minister of State for Prime Minister's Office, Community Development and Sports, Education, and Trade and Industry; Member of Parliament, East Coast Group Representation Constituency (1997–2001), Joo Chiat Single Member Constituency (2001–2011); Adjunct Professor, Nanyang Centre of Public Administration, Nanyang Technological University
- Leong Chan-Hoong: Deputy Head, Social Lab, Lee Kuan Yew Institute of Policy Studies, National University of Singapore
- Lee Guan Kin: Pioneer Head of Division (1998–2007) and Distinguished Senior Research Fellow, Centre for Chinese Language & Culture, Nanyang Technological University

=== Arts ===
- Goh Lay Kuan: Singapore pioneer dance choreographer and arts educator; Winner, Cultural Medallion, 1995; Co-founder, Singapore Performing Arts School
- Yang Libing: Mediacorp actress.
- Yang Lina: Mediacorp actress.
- Zeng Huifen: Mediacorp actress.

=== Business and enterprise ===
- Jason Yeo – Founder and Chief Executive of JCS Group.

== Gallery ==
=== Campus ===
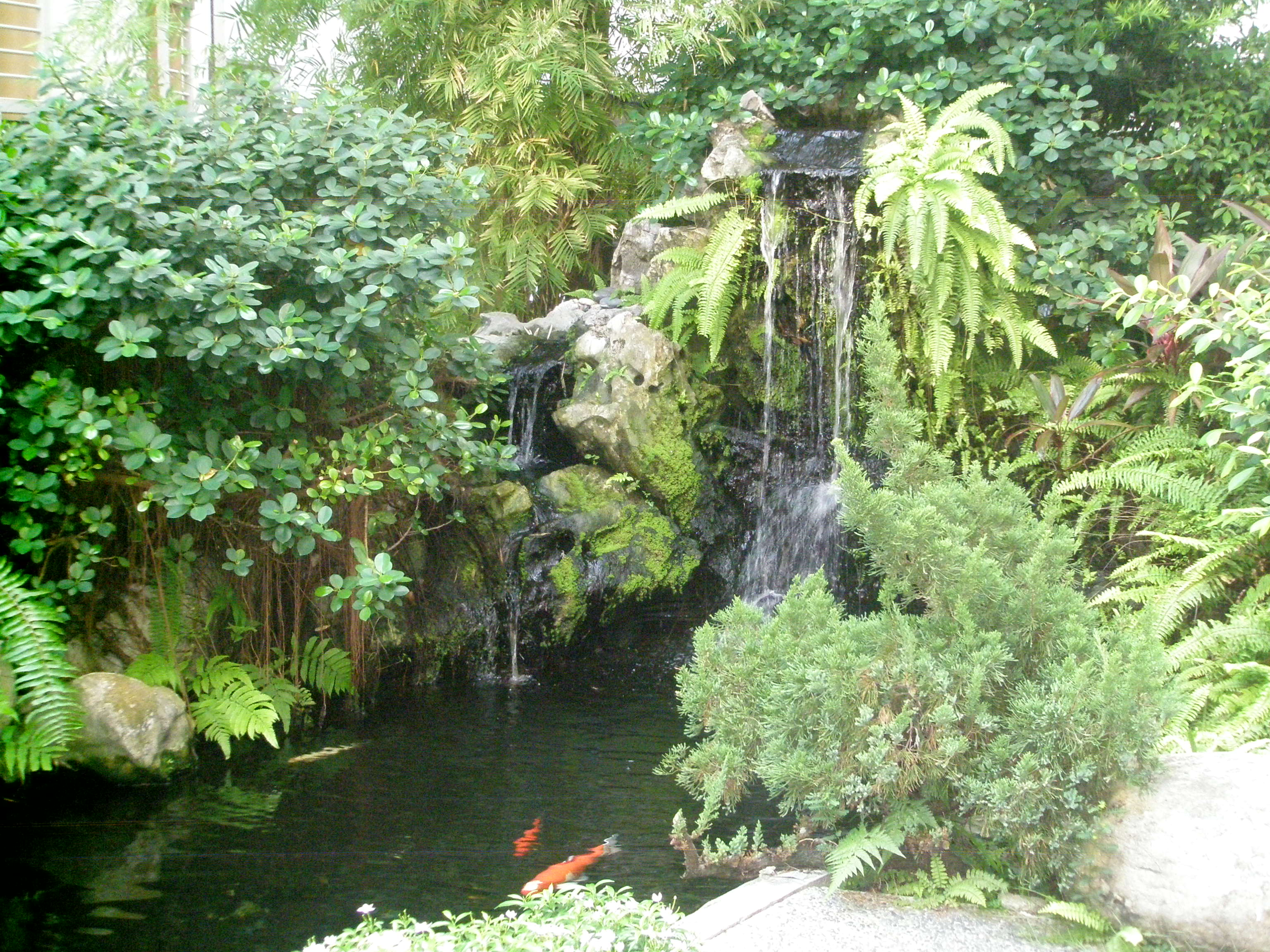
The fountain in Nan Chiau High School.

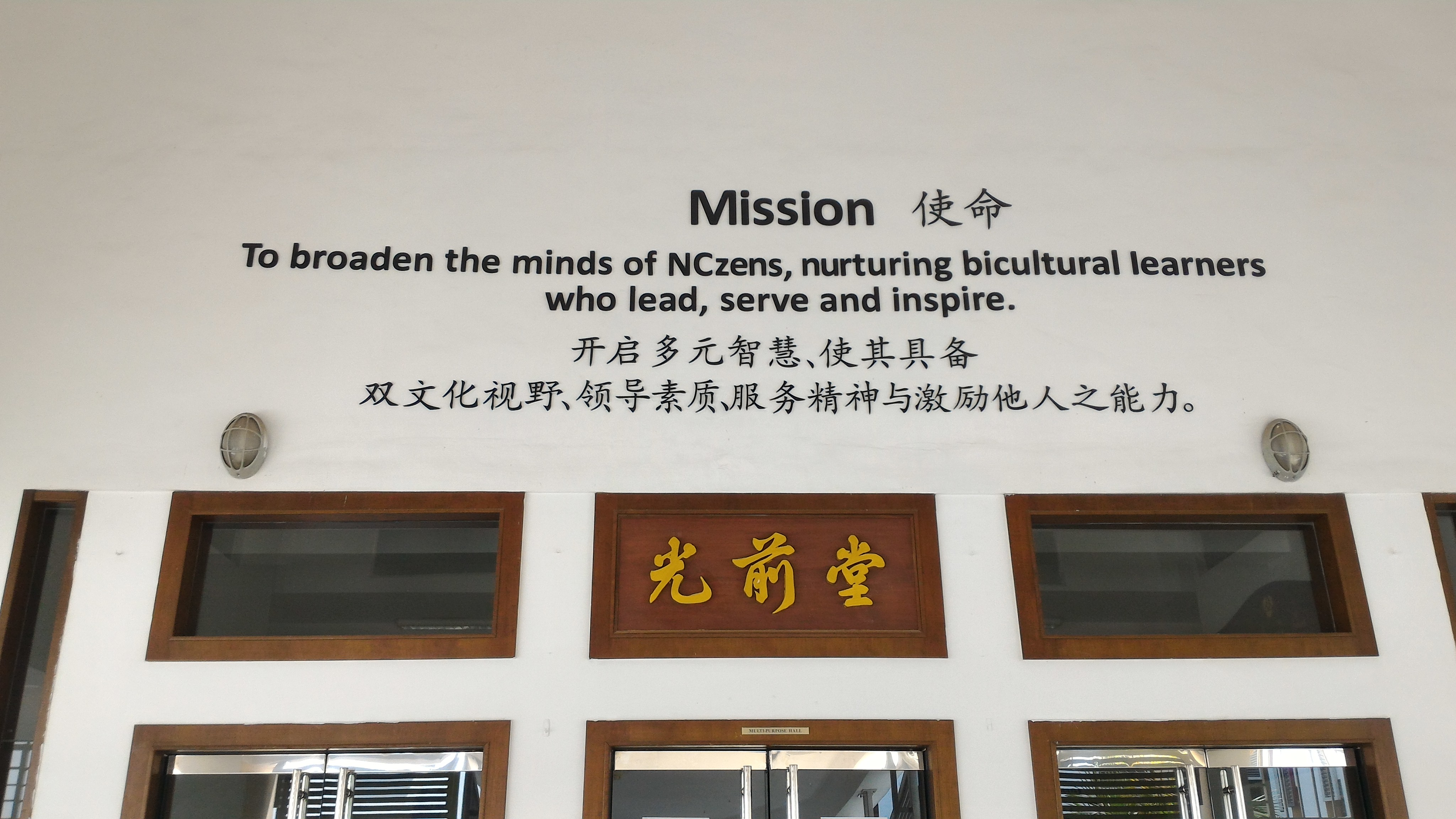
Main entrance of Nan Chiau High's Kong Chian Hall

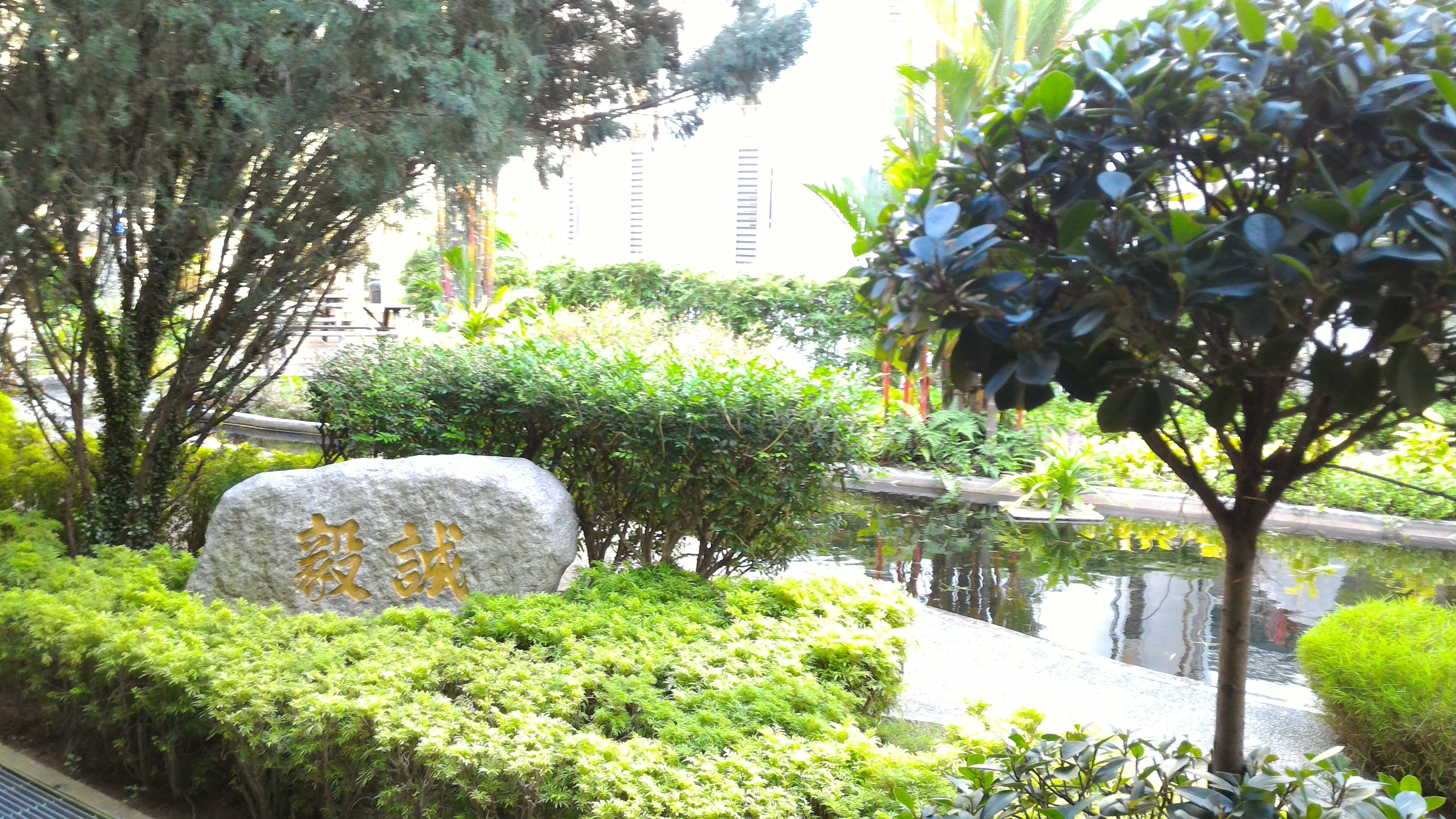
Nan Chiau High's Front Garden, featuring the school motto inscribed on a stone tablet.

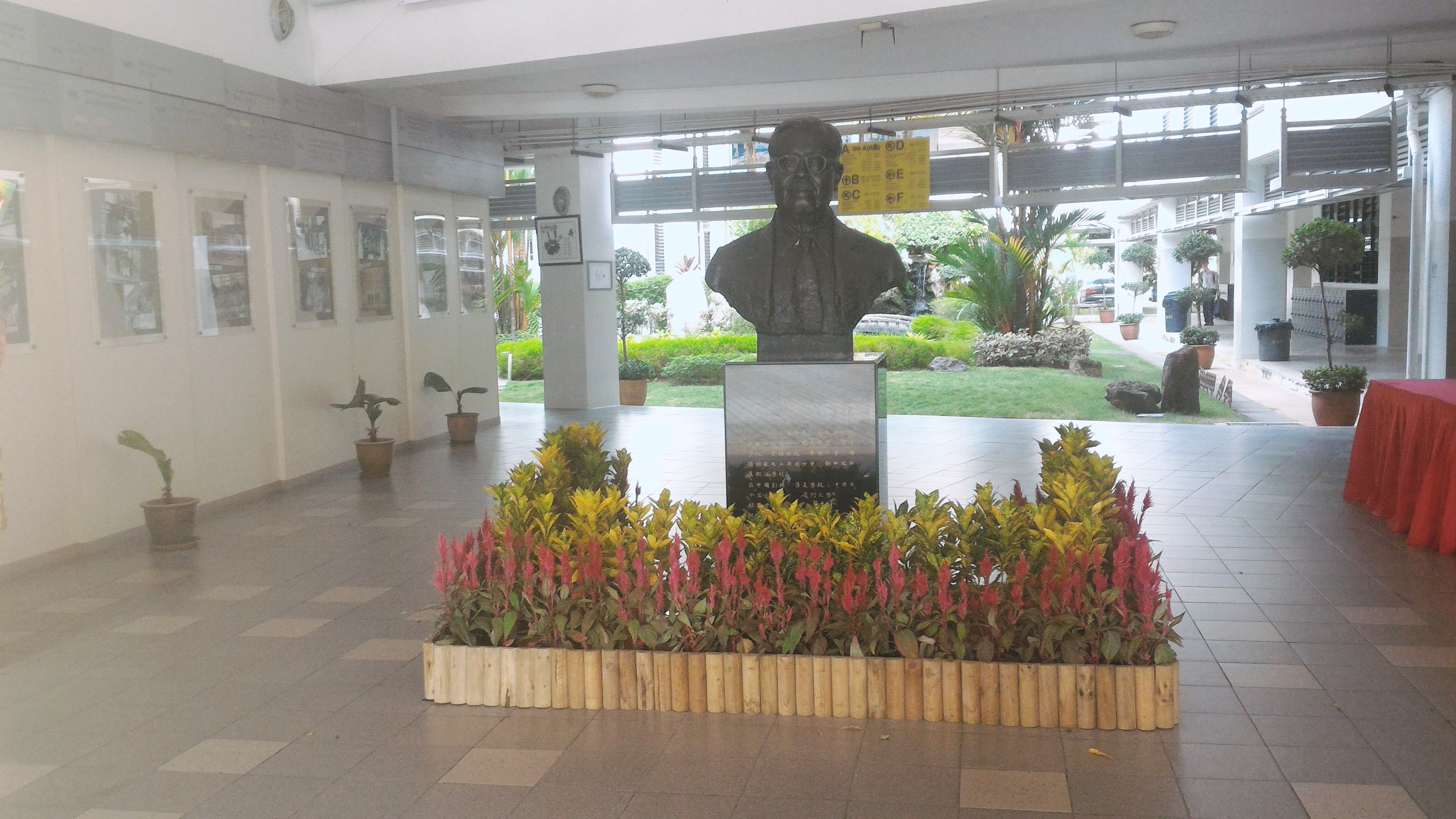
The head statue of the institution founder Mr Tan Kah Kee at the foyer, taken amid the institution's 69th anniversary.

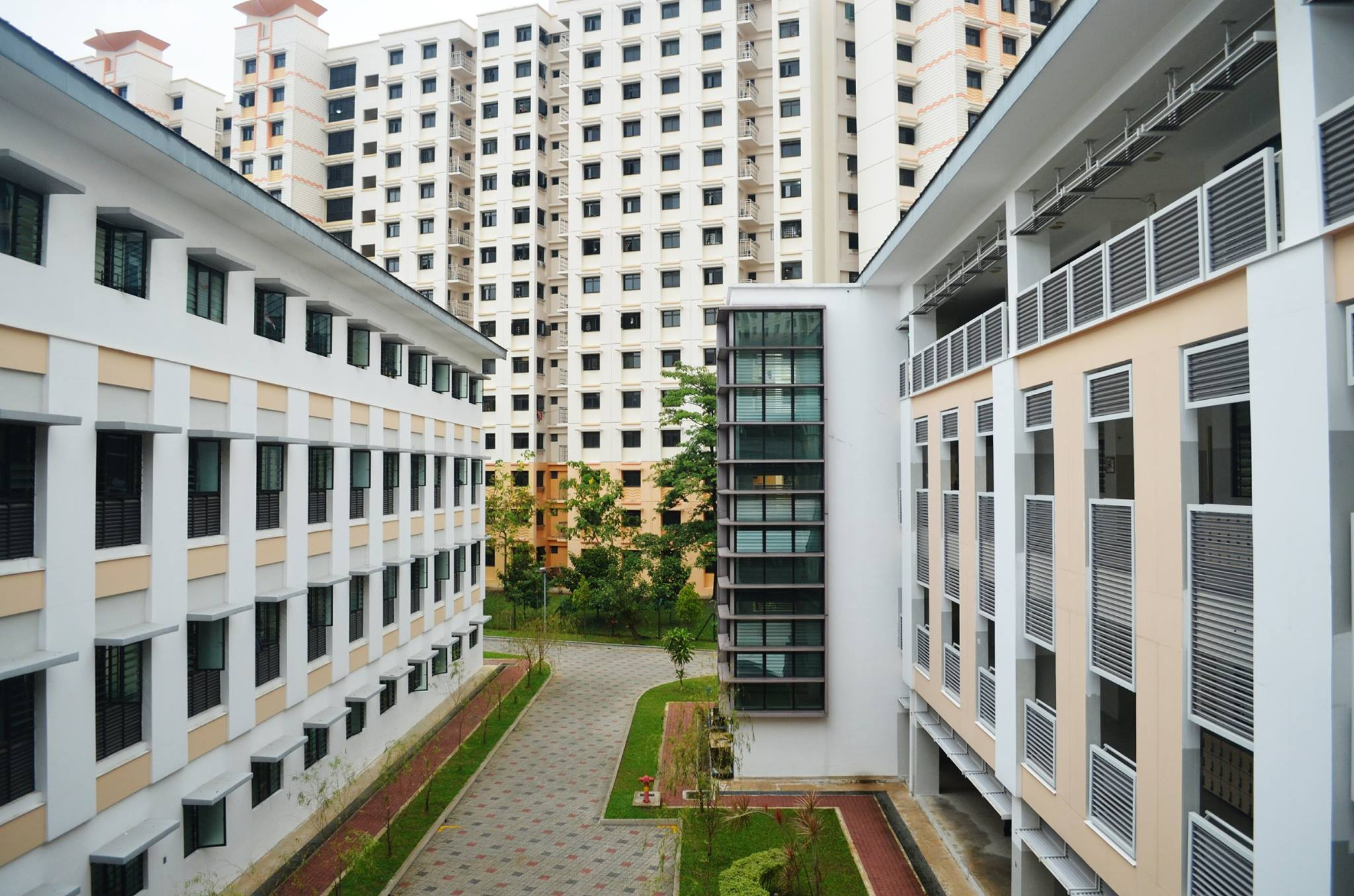
Classroom blocks of Nan Chiau High School.

=== Events ===
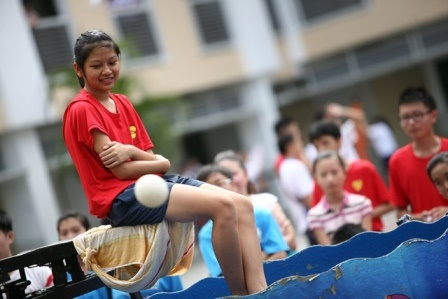
A student-operated game booth during Nan Chiau High School's annual SHINES in Harmony Carnival in 2012.

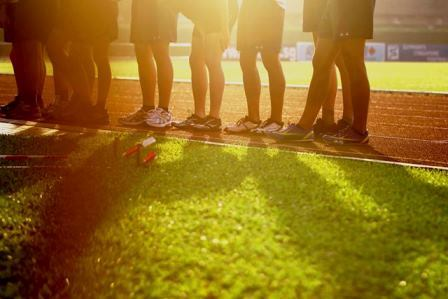
A shot taken during Nan Chiau High School's last individual sports day in 2012.

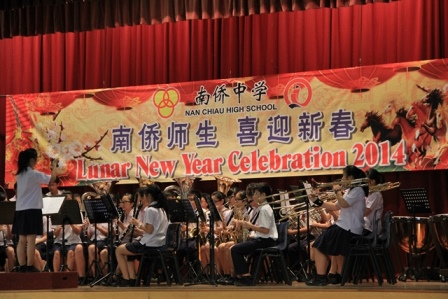
Nan Chiau High School's Chinese New Year Celebrations 2014 performance by the institution's Chinese Orchestra.

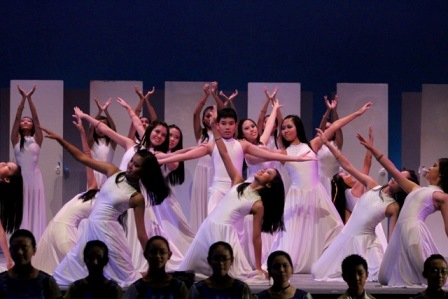
Nan Chiau High School contemporary dance performers during the institution's 65th anniversary public performance "Equilibrium the Musical" in 2012.

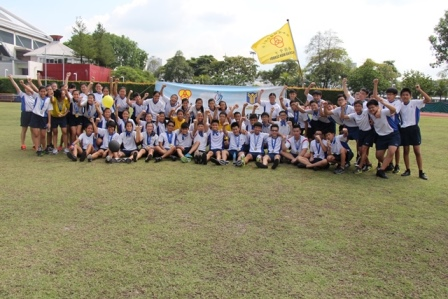
A group photo of Nan Chiau High School track and field team at the Inter-school Combined Sports Meet in 2013.

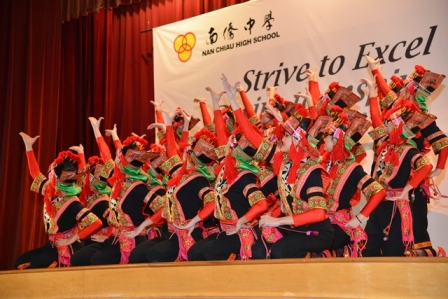
Nan Chiau High School Chinese dancers performing during the institution's 67th anniversary celebration.

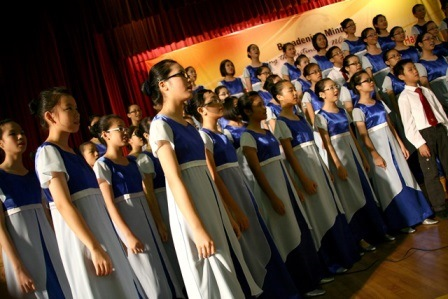
Nan Chiau High School Choir performing during the institution's SHINES in Harmony Carnival 2012.

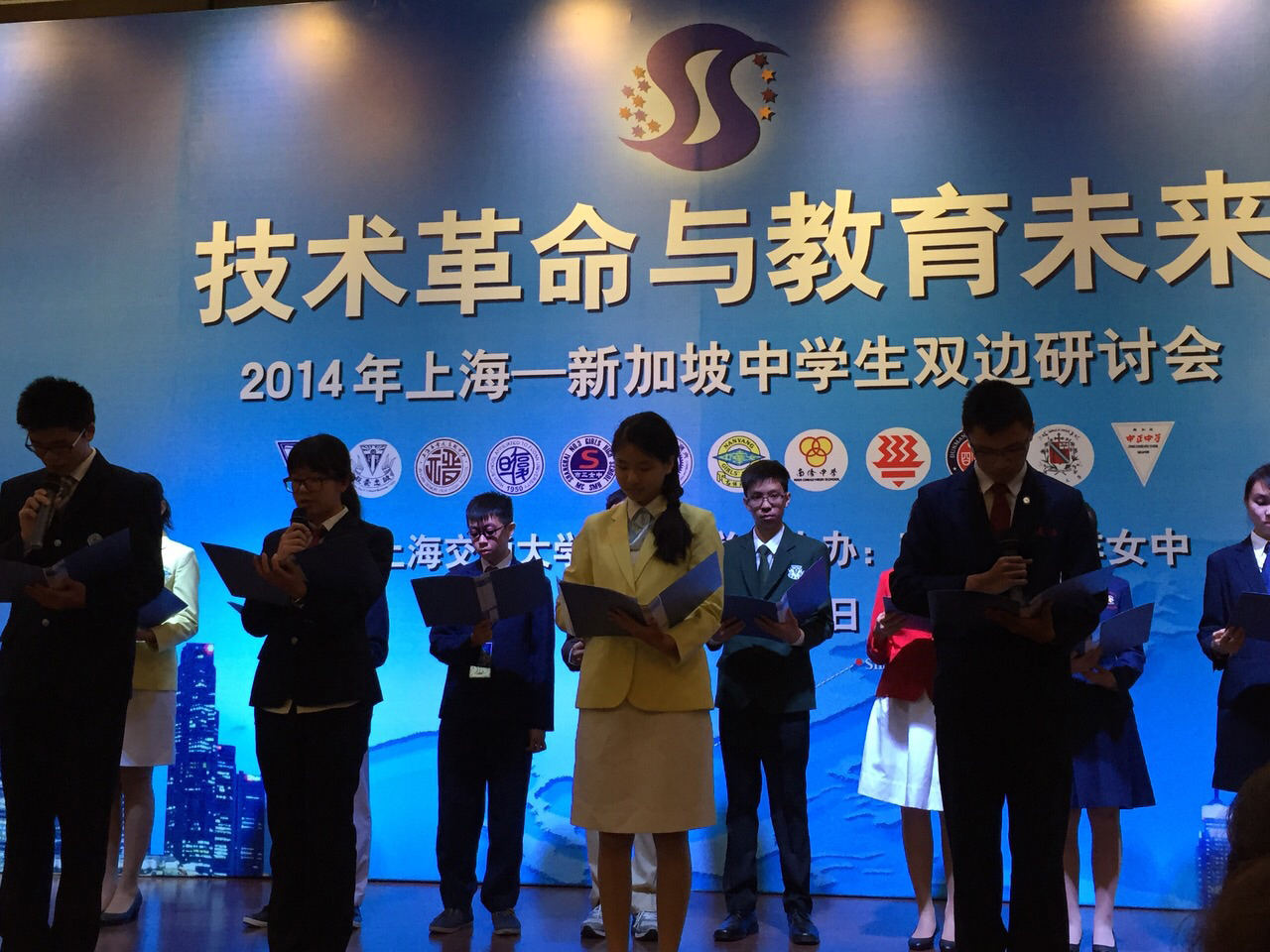
Student representatives from Nan Chiau High School with the Singapore SAP schools delegation at the annual Shanghai-Singapore Secondary School Students' Forum, taken in 2014.
