= Fukui Prefectural Fujishima High School =

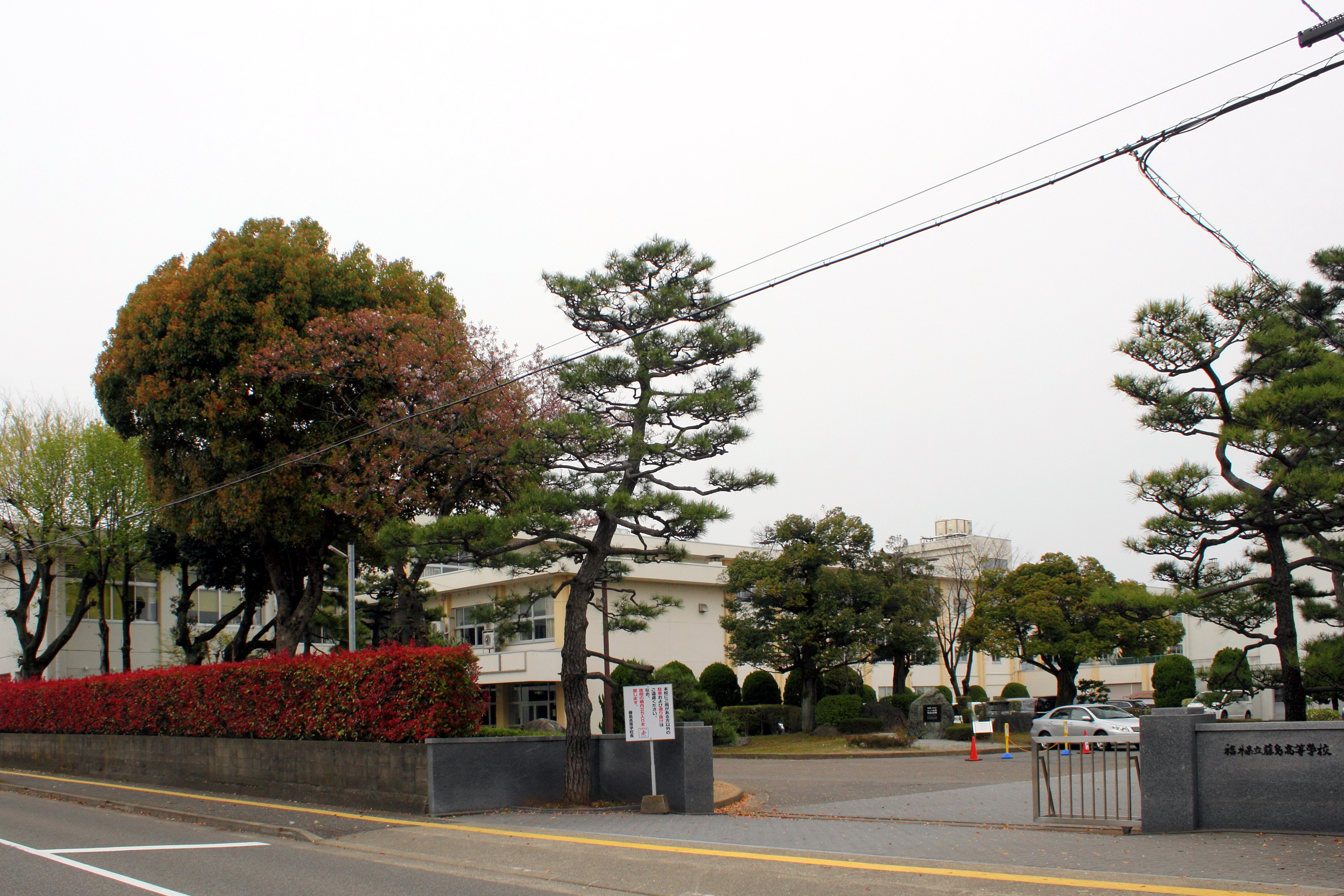

Location
- Fukui, Fukui; Japan; 36°4′47.6″N 136°12′58.4″E

Information
- Type: public
- Established: 1855

Fukui Prefectural Fujishima High School (福井県立藤島高等学校, Fukui Kenritsu Fujishima Kōtō Gakkō) is a high school in Fukui, Japan, founded in 1855. The school is operated by the Fukui Prefectural Board of Education. In 2004 the school was chosen as SSH.

It is located close to University of Fukui and Fukui Fine Arts Museum.

Its best known graduate is probably Yoichiro Nambu, winner of the 2008 Nobel Prize in Physics.

== History ==
The history of Fujishima High School can be traced back to the han school of Fukui Domain, Meidōkan (明道館) established in 1855.

== Notable alumni ==
- Hirase Sakugorō - botanist
- Yoichiro Nambu - physicist, Nobel laureate
- Keisuke Okada - admiral in the Imperial Japanese Navy and the 31st Prime Minister of Japan
- Machi Tawara - modern poet
- Chosei Komatsu - orchestral conductor
- Yuichi Nakagaichi - former volleyball player

== See also ==
- List of high schools in Fukui Prefecture
