= Fukui Prefectural Koshi High School =

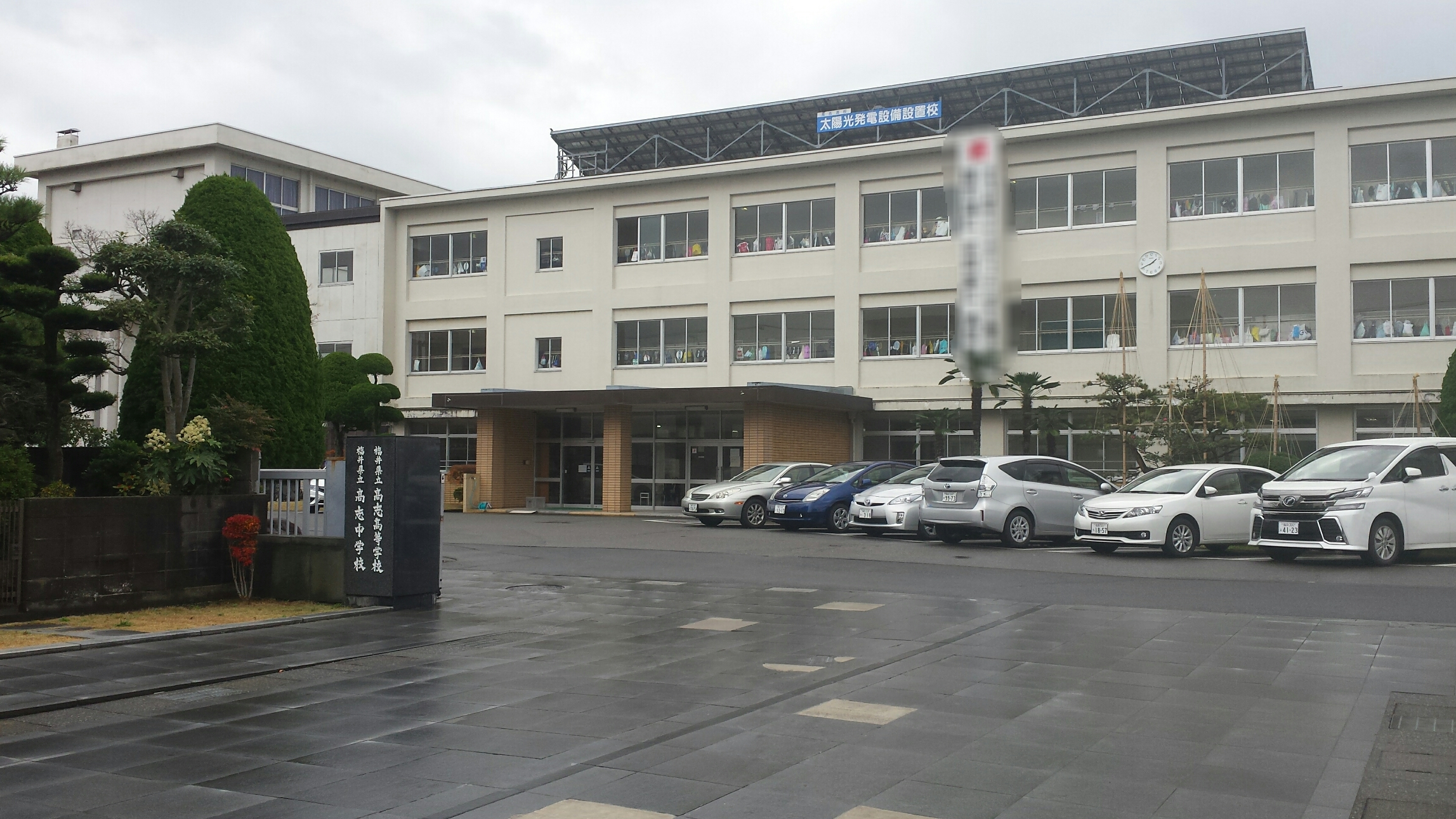

Location
- Fukui, Fukui; Japan; 36°3′34.3″N 136°13′56.7″E

Information
- Type: Public
- Established: 1 April 1948

Fukui Prefectural Koshi High School (福井県立高志高等学校, Fukui Kenritsu Koshi Kōtō Gakkō) is a high school in Fukui, Fukui, Japan, founded in 1948. The school is operated by the Fukui Prefectural Board of Education. As of April 2014, 1061 students (554 male, 507 female) were enrolled. In 2003 it was selected as a Super Science High School (SSH) for five years by MEXT of Japan. This designation was renewed in 2008 and again in 2013.

== Courses ==
- General Course (full-time)
- Science and Mathematics Course (full-time)

== Notable alumni ==
- Kazuo Kawasaki, design director, Ph.D. in Medicine
- Hiroshi Takeshima, enka singer

== Access ==
The school is about a 15-minute walk from the Fukui Station.

== Sister schools ==
- George Washington High School, San Francisco, USA
- New Providence High School, New Providence, NJ

== See also ==
- List of high schools in Prefecture
