= List of high schools in Fukui Prefecture =

This is a list of high schools in Fukui Prefecture, Japan.

== Public high schools (prefectural) ==
All of the high schools in this section have Fukui Prefectural (福井県立, Fukui Kenritsu) at the beginning of the official school name. This has been omitted to make the page easier to read.

Asuwa Senior High School (足羽高等学校, Asuwa Kōtō Gakkō)
Established: 1981
Address: 44 Sugitani-chō, Fukui-shi, Fukui-ken 〒918−8155
Telephone: 0776-36-1678
Fax: 0776-36-1676
URL: Asuwa Senior High School(available in English and Chinese)

Usui Senior High School (羽水高等学校, Usui Kōtō Gakkō)
Established: 1963
Address: 1–302 Usui, Fukui-shi, Fukui-ken 〒918−8114
Telephone: 0776-38-2225
Fax: 0776-38-2290
URL: Usui Senior High School

Ono Senior High School (大野高等学校, Ōno Kōtō Gakkō)
Established: 1901
Address: 10–28 Shinjō, Ono-shi, Fukui-ken 〒912−0085
Telephone: 0779-66-3411
URL: Ono Senior High School

Okuetsu Meisei Senior High School (奥越明成高等学校, Okuetsu Meisei Kōtō Gakkō)
Established: 2011
Address: 9–10 Tomoe, Ono-shi, Fukui-ken 〒912−0016
Telephone: 0779-66-4610
URL: Okuetsu Meisei Senior High School

Kagaku-Gijutsu Senior High School (科学技術高等学校, Kagaku-Gijutsu Kōtō Gakkō)
Established: 1907
Address: 28 Shimoemori-chō, Fukui-shi, Fukui-ken 〒918−8037
Telephone: 0776-36-1856
Fax: 0776-36-1871
URL: Kagakugijutsu Senior High School

Katsuyama Senior High School (勝山高等学校, Katsuyama Kōtō Gakkō)
Established: 1948
Address: 2-3-1 Shōwa-machi, Katsuyama-shi, Fukui-ken 〒911-8540
Telephone: 0779-88-0200
Fax: 0776-88-1530
URL: Katsuyama Senior High School

Kanazu Senior High School (金津高等学校, Kanazu Kōtō Gakkō)
Established: 1982
Address: 4-5-1 Ichihime, Awara-shi, Fukui-ken 〒919-0621
Telephone: 0776-73-1255
Fax: 0776-73-1254
URL: Kanazu Senior High School

Koshi High School (高志高等学校, Koshi Kōtō Gakkō)
Established: 1948
Address: 2-25-8 Miyuki, Fukui-shi, Fukui-ken 〒910-0854
Telephone: 0776-24-5175
Fax: 0776-24-5177
URL: Koshi Senior High School(available in English)

Sakai Senior High School (坂井高等学校, Sakai Kōtō Gakkō)
Established: 2014
Address: 57–5 Miyaryō, Sakai-chō, Sakai-shi, Fukui-ken 〒919-0512
Telephone: 0776-66-0268
Fax: 0776-66-2669
URL: Sakai Senior High School

Sabae Senior High School (鯖江高等学校, Sabae Kōtō Gakkō)
Established: 1914
Address: 2-5-42 Funatsu-chō, Sabae-shi, Fukui-ken 〒916-8510
Telephone: 0778-51-0001
URL: Sabae Senior High School

Tannan Senior High School (丹南高等学校, Tannan Kōtō Gakkō)
Established: 1980
Address: 10-7 Kumada-chō, Sabae-shi, Fukui-ken 〒916-0062
Telephone: 0778-62-2112
Fax: 0778-62-2102
URL: Tannan Senior High School

Takefu Senior High School (武生高等学校, Takefu Kōtō Gakkō)
Established: 1898
Address: 1-25-15 Hachiman, Echizen-shi, Fukui-ken 〒915-0085
Telephone: 0778-22-0690
Fax: 0778-22-0692
URL: Takefu Senior High School

Takefu Technical Senior High School (武生工業高等学校, Takefu Kōgyō Kōtō Gakkō)
Established: 1959
Address: 1-14-16 Bunkyō, Echizen-shi, Fukui-ken 〒915-0841
Telephone: 0778-22-2730
Fax: 0778-22-2731
URL: Takefu Technical Senior High School

Takefu Commercial Senior High School (武生商業高等学校, Takefu Shōgyō Kōtō Gakkō)
Established: 1965
Address: 24 Iehisa-chō, Echizen-shi, Fukui-ken 〒915-0801
Telephone: 0778-22-2630
Fax: 0778-22-9347
URL: Takefu Commercial Senior High School

Takefu Higashi Senior High School (武生東高等学校, Takefu Higashi Kōtō Gakkō)
Established: 1987
Address: 89-10 Kita-chō, Echizen-shi, Fukui-ken 〒915-0004
Telephone: 0778-22-2253
Fax: 0778-22-2259
URL: Takefu Higashi Senior High School

Tsuruga Senior High School (敦賀高等学校, Tsuruga Kōtō Gakkō)
Established: 1877
Address: 2-1 Matsuba-chō, Tsuruga-shi, Fukui-ken 〒914-0807
Telephone: 0770-25-1521
URL: Tsuruga Senior High School

Tsuruga Technical Senior High School (敦賀工業高等学校, Tsuruga Kōgyō Kōtō Gakkō)
Established: 1962
Address: 13-1 Yamashimizu, Tsuruga-shi, Fukui-ken 〒914-0035
Telephone: 0770-25-1533
Fax: 0770-21-0185
URL: Tsuruga Technical Senior High School

Nyū Senior High School (丹生高等学校, Nyū Kōtō Gakkō)
Established: 1925
Address: 41-18-1 Uchigōri, Echizen-cho, Nyu-gun, Fukui-ken 〒916-0147
Telephone: 0778-34-0027
Fax: 0778-34-0405
URL: Nyu Senior High School

Fukui Commercial Senior High School (福井商業高等学校, Fukui Shōgyō Kōtō Gakkō)
Established: 1908
Address: 4-8-19 Kentoku, Fukui-shi, Fukui-ken 〒910-0021
Telephone: 0776-24-5180
Fax: 0776-24-5181
URL: Takefu Commercial Senior High School

Fukui Norin Senior High School (福井農林高等学校, Fukui Nōrin Kōtō Gakkō)
Established: 1893
Address: 49-1 Shinbo-chō, Fukui-shi, Fukui-ken 〒910-0832
Telephone: 0776-54-5187
Fax: 0776-54-5188
URL: Fukui Norin Senior High School

Maruoka Senior High School (丸岡高等学校, Maruoka Kōtō Gakkō)
Established: 1913
Address: 23-11-1 Shinooka, Maruoka-chō, Sakai-shi, Fukui-ken 〒910-0293
Telephone: 0776-66-0160
URL: Maruoka Senior High School

Mikata Senior High School (美方高等学校, Mikata Kōtō Gakkō)
Established: 1969
Address: 114 Kiyama, Wakasa-chō, Mikatakaminaka-gun, Fukui-ken 〒919–1395
Telephone: 0770-45-0793
Fax: 0770-45-0797
URL: Mikata Senior High School

Mikuni Senior High School (三国高等学校, Mikuni Kōtō Gakkō)
Established: 1909
Address: 2-1-3 Midorigaoka, Mikuni-chō, Sakai-shi, Fukui-ken 〒913-8555
Telephone: 0776-81-3255
Fax: 0776-81-3566
URL: Mikuni Senior High School

Fujishima Senior High School (藤島高等学校, Fujishima Kōtō Gakkō)
Established: 1855
Address: 2-8-30 Bunkyō, Fukui-shi, Fukui-ken 〒910-0017
Telephone: 0776-24-5171
Fax: 0776-24-5189
URL: Fujishima Senior High School

Michimori Senior High School (道守高等学校, Michimori Kōtō Gakkō)
Established: 1922
Address: 35-21 Wakasugi-chō, Fukui-shi, Fukui-ken 〒918-8575
Telephone: 0776-36-1184
Fax: 0776-36-1185
URL: Michimori Senior High School

Wakasa Senior High School (若狭高等学校, Wakasa Kōtō Gakkō)
Established: 1897
Address: 1-6-13 Chigusa, Obama-shi, Fukui-ken 〒917-8507
Telephone: 0770-52-0007
Fax: 0770-52-0037
URL: Wakasa Senior High School(available in English)

Wakasa Higashi Senior High School (若狭東高等学校, Wakasa Higashi Kōtō Gakkō)
Established: 1920
Address: 48-2 Kanaya, Obama-shi, Fukui-ken 〒917-0293
Telephone: 0770-56-0400
Fax: 0770-56-3763
URL: Wakasa Higashi Senior High School

== Private high schools ==
Shoei Senior High School (昭英高等学校, Shōei Kōtō Gakkō)
Address: 65–98 Nagatani, Tsuruga-shi, Fukui-ken 〒914-0198
Telephone: 0770-23-7221
Fax 0770-25-8383
URL: Shoei Senior High School

Tsurugakehi Senior High School (敦賀気比高等学校, Tsurugakehi Kōtō Gakkō)
Established: 1986
Address: 164-1 Katsumi, Tsuruga-shi, Fukui-ken 〒914−8558
Telephone: 0770-24-2150
Fax: 0770-24-2620
URL: Tsurugakehi Senior High School

Fukui Senior High School attached to Fukui University of Technology (福井工業大学附属福井高等学校, Fukui Kōgyō Daigaku Fuzoku Fukui Kōtō Gakkō)
Established: 1959
Address: 3-6-1 Gakuen, Fukui-shi, Fukui-ken 〒910-8505
Telephone: 0776-29-7810
Fax: 0776-29-7811
URL: Fukui Senior High School

Keishin Senior High School (啓新高等学校, Kēshin Kōtō Gakkō)
Established: 1962
Address: 4-15-1 Bunkyō, Fukui-shi, Fukui-ken 〒910−0017
Telephone: 0776-23-3489
Fax: 0776-21-2922
URL: Keishin Senior High School

Jin-ai Girl's Senior High School (仁愛女子高等学校, Jin-ai Joshi Kōtō Gakkō)
Established: 1898
Address: 4-9-24 Hōē, Fukui-shi, Fukui-ken 〒910-0004
Telephone: 0776-24-0493
Fax: 0776-24-4134
URL: Jin-ai Girl's Senior High School(available in English)

Hokuriku Senior High School (北陸高等学校, Hokuriku Kōtō Gakkō)
Established: 1880
Address: 1-8-1 Bunkyō, Fukui-shi, Fukui-ken 〒910−0017
Telephone: 0776-23-0321
URL: Hokuriku Senior High School

Fukui Minami Senior High School (福井南高等学校, Fukui Minami Kōtō Gakkō)
Established: 1995
Address: 15-12 Shimbiraki-chō, Fukui-shi, Fukui-ken 〒919－0328
Telephone: 0776-38-7711
Fax: 0776-38-7033
URL: Fukui Minami Senior High School

== Closed high schools ==
All of the high schools in this section were Fukui Prefectural.

Ono Higashi Senior High School (大野東高等学校, Ōno Higashi Kōtō Gakkō)
Established: 1965
Closed: 2013(integrated to Okuetsu Meisei Senior High School)
Address: 9–10 Tomoe, Ono-shi, Fukui-ken 〒912−0016
Telephone: 0779-66-4610
Fax: 0779-66-5577
URL: Ono Higashi Senior High School

Obama Fisheries High School (小浜水産高等学校, Obama Suisan Kōtō Gakkō)
Established: 1895
Closed: 2013(integrated to Wakasa Senior High School)
Address: Nishibori 5-2 Horiyashiki 2, Obama-shi, Fukui-ken 〒917-8555
Telephone: 0770-52-1950
Fax: 0770-53-0305
URL: Obama Fisheries High School

Katsuyama Minami Senior High School (勝山南高等学校, Katsuyama Minami Kōtō Gakkō)
Established: 1942
Closed: 2013(integrated to Okuetsu Meisei Senior High School)
Address: 3-1-69 Shōwa-machi, Katsuyama-shi, Fukui-ken 〒911-0802
Telephone: 0779-88-0162
Fax: 0779-88-0390
URL: Katsuyama Minami Senior High School

Sakai Agricultural Senior High School (坂井農業高等学校, Sakai Nōgyō Kōtō Gakkō)
Established: 1917
Closed: 2016 (integrated to Sakai Senior High School)
Address: 57–5 Miyaryō, Sakai-chō, Sakai-shi, Fukui-ken 〒919-0512
Telephone: 0776-66-0268
Fax: 0776-66-2669
URL: Sakai Agricultural Senior High School

Harue Technical Senior High School (春江工業高等学校, Harue Kōgyō Kōtō Gakkō)
Established: 1963
Closed: 2016 (integrated to Sakai Senior High School)
Address: 8-1 Edomekamimidori, Harue-chō, Sakai-shi, Fukui-ken 〒919-0461
Telephone: 0776-51-0178
Fax: 0776-51-7066
URL: Harue Technical Senior High School
