= An Ode to Life =

- 三十风雨路
- Genre: Period drama Family
- Written by: Rebecca Leow
- Starring: Huang Biren; Terence Cao; Yang Libing; Hong Peixing; Yao Wenlong
- Country of origin: Singapore
- Original language: Chinese
- No. of episodes: 40

Production
- Running time: approx. 45 minutes

Original release
- Network: MediaCorp Channel 8
- Release: August 2004

Related
- Together (2009); Devotion (2011)

An Ode To Life (Chinese: 三十风雨路) is a 40-episode blockbuster Chinese drama aired in Singapore. It was telecast in August 2004. The show is set in the 1970s and goes through history all the way to the modern days of the 2000s. The drama achieved the highest viewership rate in Year 2004 (17%) despite being broadcast at the 7pm slot (which is generally perceived to have lower viewership figures), defeating other popular dramas in the same year such as Spice Siblings, Double Happiness and A Child's Hope 2. It is currently showing on Sun - Mon at 4am, succeeding Sealed with a Kiss.

The challenging role of Ah Zhi is seen as a "tailor-made" role for Huang Bi Ren.

This drama was aired on China's largest broadcast network CCTV-8 in September 2009 and garnered a largely favorable reception from the Mainland audience.

== Synopsis ==
The show mainly revolves around the lead character, Ah Zhi (played by Huang Biren), who comes from a poor family. She marries into the wealthy Zhang family and is constantly looked down on by her mother-in-law and brother-in-law's wife (Guo Ailin, Lina Yang) due to her background. Although she wins her father-in-law's favour, she has to contend with her sister-in-law's (Zhang WenSi, Yang LiBin) jealousy after giving birth to two sons. She later saves the company from bankruptcy and reunites the Zhang family despite the many difficulties she faces.

== Cast ==
=== Main cast ===
Cast	Role
Huang Biren	Wang Su Zhi
Terence Cao	Ou Qi Ming
Hong Peixing	Zhang Wen Fu
Yao Wenlong	Zhang Wen Lu
Sean Say	Zhang Wen Shou
Yang Libing	Zhang Wen Si
Zhang Yaodong	Zhang Wen Xi

=== Other cast ===
Cast	Role
Yang Lina	Guo Ai Ling
Joey Swee	Qiu Mei Na
Chen Jun Guang	Pan Jie Qi
Richard Low	Zhang Yao Kun
Nick Shen	Zhang Rui Ming
Alan Tern	Zhang Rui An
Zen Chong	Zhang Rui Xiang
May Phua	Pan Zi Nan
Tai Chien Yuen	Pan Zi Juan
Michelle Liow	Ou Bao Er

== 2004 Accolades ==
Award	Nominee	Result
Best Actress 最佳女主角	Huang Biren	Nominated
Best Supporting Actress 最佳女配角	May Phua	Nominated
Best Drama Serial 最佳电视剧	—N/a	Nominated
Top Rated Drama Serial (Viewership ratings)	An Ode to Life	Won
