= Yang Lina (actress) =

Singaporean actress

- Born: 11 January 1963; Singapore
- Died: 20 March 2010 (aged 47); Singapore
- Burial place: Mandai Crematorium
- Occupation: Actress
- Years active: 1983–2009
- Spouse: Chau Kim Wa (m. 1990)
- Children: 2 daughters
- Family: Yang Libing (Sister)

Chinese name
- Traditional Chinese: 楊莉娜
- Simplified Chinese: 杨莉娜
Transcriptions
Standard Mandarin
- Hanyu Pinyin: Yáng Lìnà

Yang Lina (simplified Chinese: 杨莉娜; traditional Chinese: 楊莉娜, 11 January 1963 - 20 March 2010), also known as Lina Yang, was a Singaporean actress. She was prominently a full-time Mediacorp artiste from 1983 to 2009 and was often cast as conniving, plotting characters. She died on 20 March 2010 due to uterine cancer, aged 47.

== Personal life ==
Yang studied at Nan Chiau High School.

Yang became an actress in 1984 after previously working as a bank employee. She had attended an acting class with her younger sister, Yang Libing, and then joined the Singapore Broadcasting Corporation, which is now part of MediaCorp. Her most well known roles included the 1986 film, Neighbours, and Samsui Women.

She married her husband Chau Kim Wa, a make-up artist, in December 1990. She took two professional breaks from acting to give birth to her two daughters.

Yang opened a hair salon with her sister in 2004. She was diagnosed with uterine cancer during the late 2000s, but continued to act sporadically. She died of cancer in the home of her younger sister, Yang Libing, on 20 March 2010. Her age was 47. Yang is survived by her younger sister.

== Filmography ==
Year	Title	Role	Notes
1984	Youth 年轻人 之《南游记》	Qiu Mei Hua 邱美华	
1985	Men From The Past 大侠吴三奇	Jennie Liu 刘珍妮	
1985	Takeover 人在旅途	Jennie Fei 费珍妮	
1985	Home is Where Love Is 屋爱屋家		
1986	Samsui Women	Ah Jiao 阿娇	
1986	Neighbours 芝麻绿豆		
1987	Painted Faces 戏班	Ming Ru Hua 明如花	
1987	Strange Encounters 奇缘 之《银河星》	Chu Chu 楚楚	
1987	Strange Encounters 奇缘 之《塞外胡笳》	Jiao Er 姣儿	
1988	The Last Applause 舞榭歌台	Li Ping 李萍	
1988	Ups and Downs 婚姻保险	Wen Xue Feng 温雪凤	
1989	Turn of the Tide 浮沉	Chen Yu Jiao 陈玉娇	
1990	Heavenly Match 天生一对	Dai Jin Hua 戴金花	
1991	Secret Operation 急转弯	Xiao Yan Zi 小燕子	
1991	Guardian Angel 爸爸怕怕	Yu Mu Rong (Madam Mahjong) 余慕蓉（麻将夫人）	
1993	The Brave One 荡寇英雄	Zheng Xiao Hua's Mother 郑小花母亲	Cameo
1993	Endless Love 未了缘	Mistress Xie 谢姨太	
1993	Ride the Waves 卿本佳人	Wang Xiao Bi 王小碧	
1993	The Young And The Restless 俏皮战士	Xiao Mei 小美	
1993	Happy Foes 欢喜冤家	Police Officer 警员	
1993	The Witty Advisor 金牌师爷	Emerald 翡翠	
1993	Ninjas in Town 伏魔奇兵	Bing Bing 冰冰	
1993	Web of Deceit 鹤啸九天	Mu Rong San Niang 慕容三娘	
1994	Bond of Love 情网	Chen Mei Na 陈美娜	
1994	Lethal Duo 天使追辑令	Song Wan Ying 宋婉瑛	
1994	The Young Ones 壮志骄阳	Zhang Mei Zhen 张美珍	
1994	Fiery Lover 烈火情人	Nancy 姩熙	
1994	Legendary White Snake 白蛇后传	Centipedes Spirit 蜈蚣精	
1994	Dr Justice 法医故事 之《焚火新娘》	Ah Jiao 阿娇	
1994	Truly Yours 聪明糊涂心	Shen Ah Jiao 沈阿娇	
1994	Silk and Romance 情丝万缕	Qiu Ping 秋萍	
1995	Heartbeat 医胆仁心	Ma Hai Lun 马海伦	
1995	Dream Hunters 追心一族	Lu Mei Hua 陆梅花	
1995	Heavenly Ghost Catcher 天师钟馗 之《杨贵妃》、《六月雪》	Lei Hai Qing & Wan Er 雷海青、婉儿	
1995	The Morning Express 阳光列车	Mary 玛丽	
1995	Project B B计划	Huang Ya Hua 黄亚花	Cameo
1995	Dr Justice II 法医故事II 之《双尸花月夜》	Hong Dai Si 洪黛丝	
1996	Beyond Dawn 女子监狱	Guan Bi Lian 关碧莲	
1996	Triad Justice 飞越珍珠坊	Jin Lian 金莲	
1996	A Different Live 妈姐情缘	Ye Ling Ling 叶玲玲	
2002	Beautiful Connection 九层糕	Gao Yu Zhu 高玉珠	
2002	Kopi-O II 浓浓咖啡乌	Honey 哈你	Cameo
2004	An Ode to Life	Guo Ai Ling 郭爱玲	
2009	Perfect Cut 2	Stella 丝萜啦	
