= Saga Prefectural Chienkan Junior & Senior High School =

Coordinates: 33°16′25″N 130°18′08″E

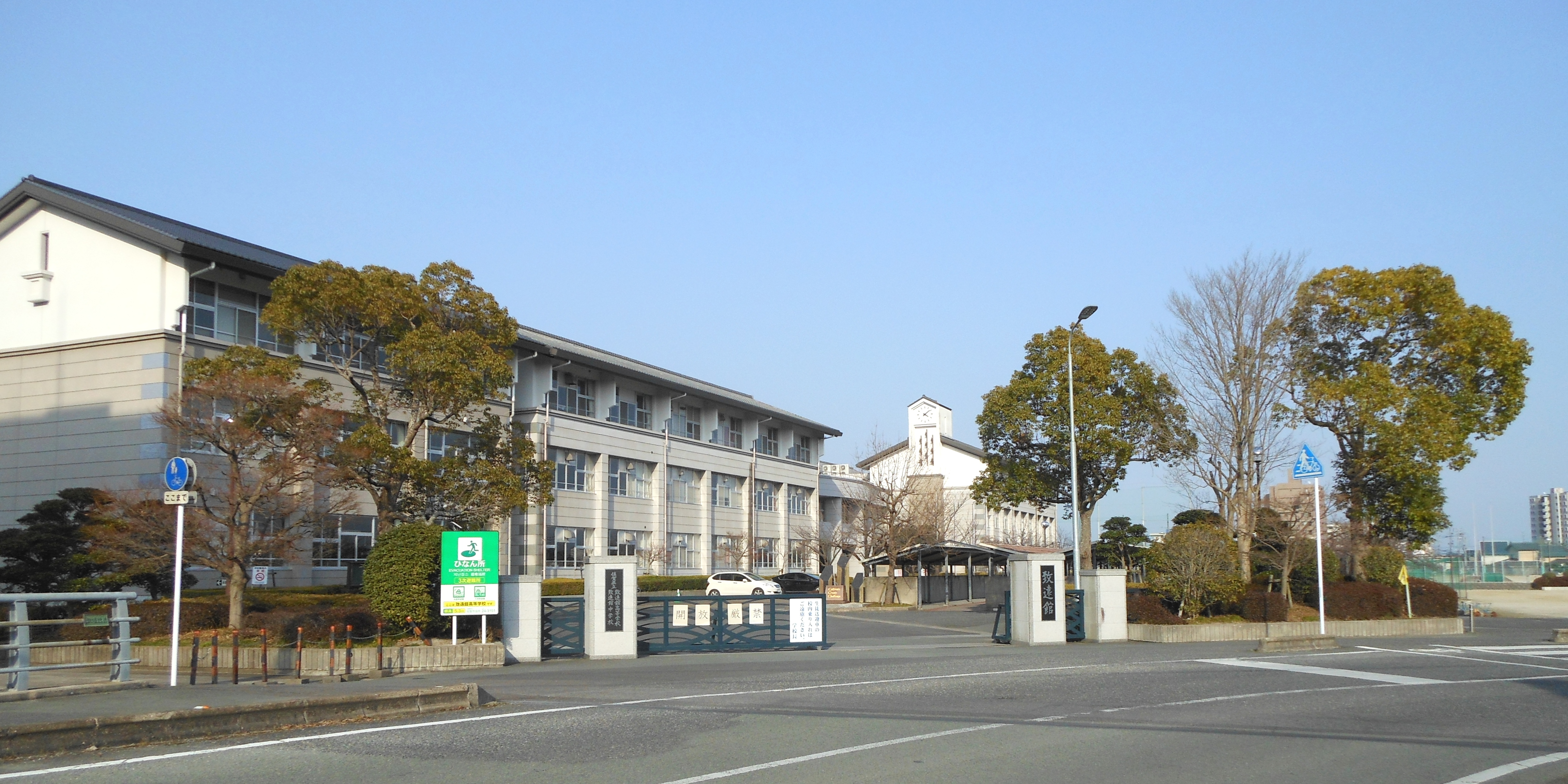
- Saga Prefectural Chienkan High School front view
- Saga City, Saga Prefecture; Japan

Information
- Type: Secondary
- Motto: Cultivate, Create, Challenge
- Established: 1987 (Shōwa 63)
- Principal: Yoshiaki Mizokami
- Website: http://www3.saga-ed.jp/chien-hs/index.htm

Saga Prefectural Chienkan Junior & Senior High School is both a junior and senior high school and is located in Saga City, Saga Prefecture, Japan. It was awarded the title of Super Science High School in Japan.

== History ==
Chienkan High School is made up of two schools:

- Chienkan Senior High School
- Cheinkan Junior High School

=== Chienkan Senior High School ===
On March 27, 1987, the site for Chienkan was purchased from the Saga Prefectural Estate Development Public Corporation. Building of the school was completed in March 1988 and the school was officially established on April 1, 1988. On April 8, Chienkan celebrated its opening and entrance ceremony. The first principal of Chienkan was Mr. Uchikawa Kazumi^{1}.

=== Chienkan Junior High School ===
Chienkan Junior High School was established on December 1, 2002. Mr. Morinaga Kazuo was appointed as the first principal. The official opening of Chienkan J.H.S. was on April 1, 2003.

=== School name ===
In the years preceding the Meiji Restoration, Japan was populated by a multitude of clans. Within this feudal society, the Saga Clan prospered. Its people set up a number of schools to lead the way in the great changes that would soon sweep Japan.

One of these schools was called "Chienkan". In 1867, Nabeshima Naomasa, lord of the Saga Clan, founded Chienkan in Nagasaki. Nabeshima's graduates played an important role in the political and economic backdrop to the Meiji revolution, and considered it their urgent business to implement Western thoughts and sciences in Japan.

So the original Chienkan School became a place for progressive Western learning, especially that of the English language. Many ambitious young people were drawn to this exciting academic center, where they studied subjects from technology to economics to legislation.

=== School badge ===
The Kanji, 高, at the center of the school badge means a senior high school and the five redial C's around it are the initials of "Cultivate", "Create", "Challenge", "Character" and "Cosmopolitanism".

== See also ==
- List of high schools in Japan
