= Yang Libing =

Singaporean actress

- Born: 13 November 1965 (age 59); Singapore
- Occupation: Actress
- Years active: 1984–present
- Spouse: Li Nanxing (m. 1994; div. 2004)
- Family: Yang Lina (Sister)
- Awards: Star Awards 1999 : Best Supporting Actress

Chinese name
- Traditional Chinese: 楊莉冰
- Simplified Chinese: 杨莉冰
Transcriptions
Standard Mandarin
- Hanyu Pinyin: Yáng Lìbīng
Yue: Cantonese
- Jyutping: Joeng4 Lei6 Bing1
Southern Min
- Hokkien POJ: Iûⁿ Lī-peng
- Tâi-lô: Iûnn Lī-ping

Yang Libing (Chinese: 杨莉冰, born 13 November 1965), also known as Emily Yeo, is a former Singaporean Mediacorp actress. She was prominently a full-time artiste from 1983 to 2009.

== Career ==
Yang first entered the entertainment industry in 1984 after she completed the SBC's drama training course with her older sister Yang Lina. She starred in the long-running hit drama Wok of Life and won the Best Supporting Actress award at the Star Awards in 1999.

Yang left the entertainment industry in 2009 to focus on business and operated a hair salon with her sister Yang Lina which was opened in 2004.

Yang has appeared in several of MediaCorp's anniversary events and was one of many former artistes present at the Star Awards 2012.

== Personal life ==
Yang studied at Nan Chiau High School.

Yang married actor Li Nanxing in 1994 after co-starring with him in several drama series. They divorced in 2004 citing irreconcilable differences.

Yang's sister, Yang Lina, died of uterine cancer in 2010.

== Filmography ==
Year	Title	Role	Notes	Ref
2009	Perfect Cut 2		Cameo	
2006	C.I.D.	Liu Cailian 刘彩莲		
2004	An Ode to Life	Zhang Wensi 张文思		
2004	The Crime Hunters	Sherry		
2003	Home in Toa Payoh	Wu Jinxiu 吴锦绣		
2003	My Home, My Love 同一屋檐下			
2002	Fantasy 星梦情真	Lin Li 林俐		
2002	Bukit Ho Swee	Zeng Xiu Zhen 曾秀珍		
2002	Health Matters 2 一切由慎开始 II	Lin Xiang Feng's Wife 林祥丰妻子		
2001	The Hotel	Lychee		
2001	Beyond the Axis of Truth	Song Shan Ni 宋珊妮		
2001	Love Me, Love Me Not	Chen Yu Ling 陈玉玲	Cameo	
2000	Dare to Strike 扫冰者	Xiao Ru 小茹		
2000	The Tax Files 流金税月	Wu Lin Yu 吴林玉		
1999	Darling-In-Law 我的岳母是巫婆	Chantilly	Cameo	
1999	Wok of Life	Zeng Haolian 曾浩莲		
1999	From the Medical Files 2 医生档案II	Mrs. Lim 林太太		
1998	On the Edge - Man of Lust 边缘档案 之《艺术无价》	Lu Xiao Fang 卢小芳		
1998	Singapore Short Stories 2 - Paper House 小说剧场 II 之《梦幻之屋》	Yi Lian 依莲		
1997	From the Medical Files 医生档案	Ida		
1997	The Other Parent 妈妈先生	Pan Yu Qing 潘玉清		
1997	Crimes and Tribulations 狮城奇案录 之《情书圣手》	Fang Qiu Yan 方秋燕		
1996	Mirror of Life 实况剧场 之《三水红头巾》	He San Feng 何三凤		
1996	River of Love 风雨柴船头	Liu Shu Luan 刘淑鸾		
1996	Beyond Dawn 女子监狱	Li Xiu Li 李秀丽		
1995	Sparks of Life 生命火花	Liu Tian Na 刘天娜		
1995	The Golden Pillow	Hua Jin Qiu 花锦秋		
1995	Neighbourhood Heroes 大英雄小人物	Huang Gui Hua 黄桂花		
1994	A Chance of Life 生死一线	Hu Lan 胡兰	Telemovie	
1994	Fiery Of Lover 烈火情人	Wen Jing 文靖		
1994	Twin Bliss 龙凤呈祥	Monica		
1994	Challenge of Truth 铁证柔情	Yu Zhen Zhen 余珍珍	Telemovie	
1993	The Witty Advisor 金牌师爷	Female Robber 雌大盗	Cameo	
1993	The Brave One 荡寇英雄	Zheng Xiao Hua 郑小花		
1992	Lady Steel 激情女大亨	Ye Jia Jia 叶佳佳		
1992	The Male Syndrome 妙男正传	Li Feng Jiao 黎凤娇		
1992	Changing Fortunes 爱情乒乓球	Lin Mei Man 林美满		
1991	The Darkest Hour 列血青春	Pang Li Lian 庞丽莲		
1989	Turn of the Tide 浮沉	Gu Xiu Zhen 古秀珍		
1988	Strange Encounters 2 奇缘2 之《心锁》	Xue Er 雪儿		
1988	Mystery 迷离夜 之《梦》	Wei Qi 韦琪		
1988	Airforce	Mei Qi 美琪		
1988	On the Fringe	Zhang Xiao Hua 张小花		
1988	Star Maiden 飞越银河	Du Mei 杜玫		
1987	Moving On 变迁	May		
1987	Painted Faces 戏班	Miss Yang 杨小姐		
1987	Sunshine After Rain 雨过天晴	Chen Ya Rong 陈雅蓉		
1986	Crossroads 红绿灯 之《黄昏》	Lu Jing Ying 陆晶莹		
1986	Happy Trio 青春123	Zhang Man Ling 张曼玲		
1985	Takeover 人在旅途	Ah Bing 阿冰		
1985	Unyielding Butterflies 铁蝴蝶	Xiao Tao Hong 小桃红		
1984	Pursuit 怒海萍踪	Huang Sheng Nan 黄胜男		
1984	Youth 年轻人 之《南游记》	Li Shu Yan 李淑燕		

== Awards and nominations ==
Year	Awards	Category	Nominated work	Result	Ref
1995	Star Awards	Best Supporting Actress	Challenge of Truth	Nominated	
1996	Star Awards	Best Supporting Actress	The Golden Pillow	Nominated	
1997	Star Awards	Best Supporting Actress	River of Love	Nominated	
1999	Star Awards	Best Supporting Actress	Wok of Life	Won	
