= Sagano High School =

Coordinates: 35°01′11″N 135°42′14″E

Kyoto Prefectural Sagano High School
- 京都府立嵯峨野高等学校
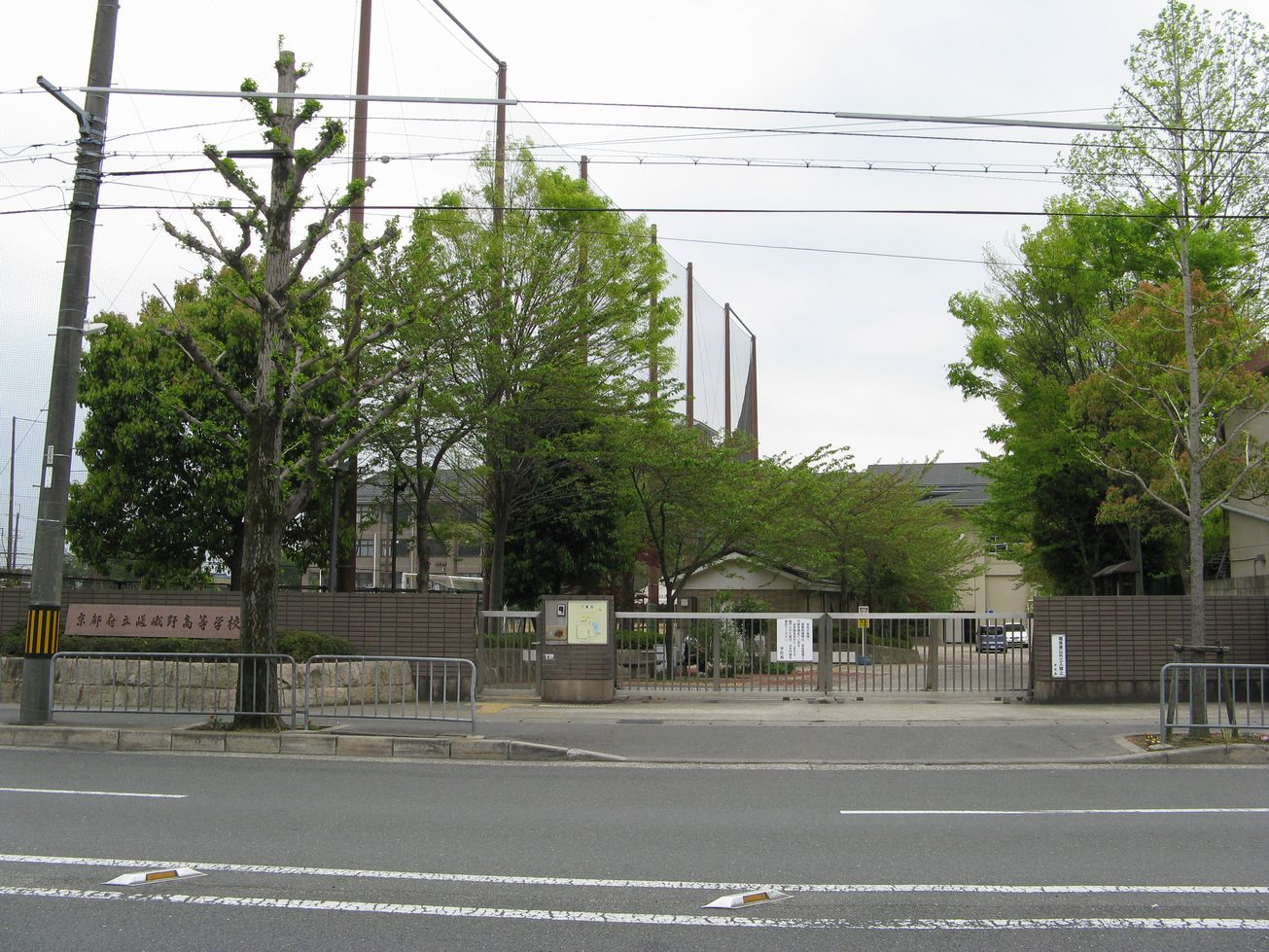
- Front Gate of Sagano High School

Location
- 15 Tokiwa Dan-noue-cho, Ukyo-ku, Kyoto City, 616-8226; Kyoto City, Kyoto, Japan

Information
- Type: Public, Coeducational
- Established: 1941; 85 years ago
- Faculty: approx. 84
- Enrollment: approx. 1000 students
- Average class size: 42
- Classes offered: COSMOS Courses, Super Science Courses, Super Global Courses
- Campus: Urban
- Colors: Crimson, Green, and White
- Website: www.kyoto-be.ne.jp/sagano-hs/

Sagano High School (嵯峨野高等学校), is a nationally designated Super Global and Super Science High School in Kyoto, Japan.

== History ==
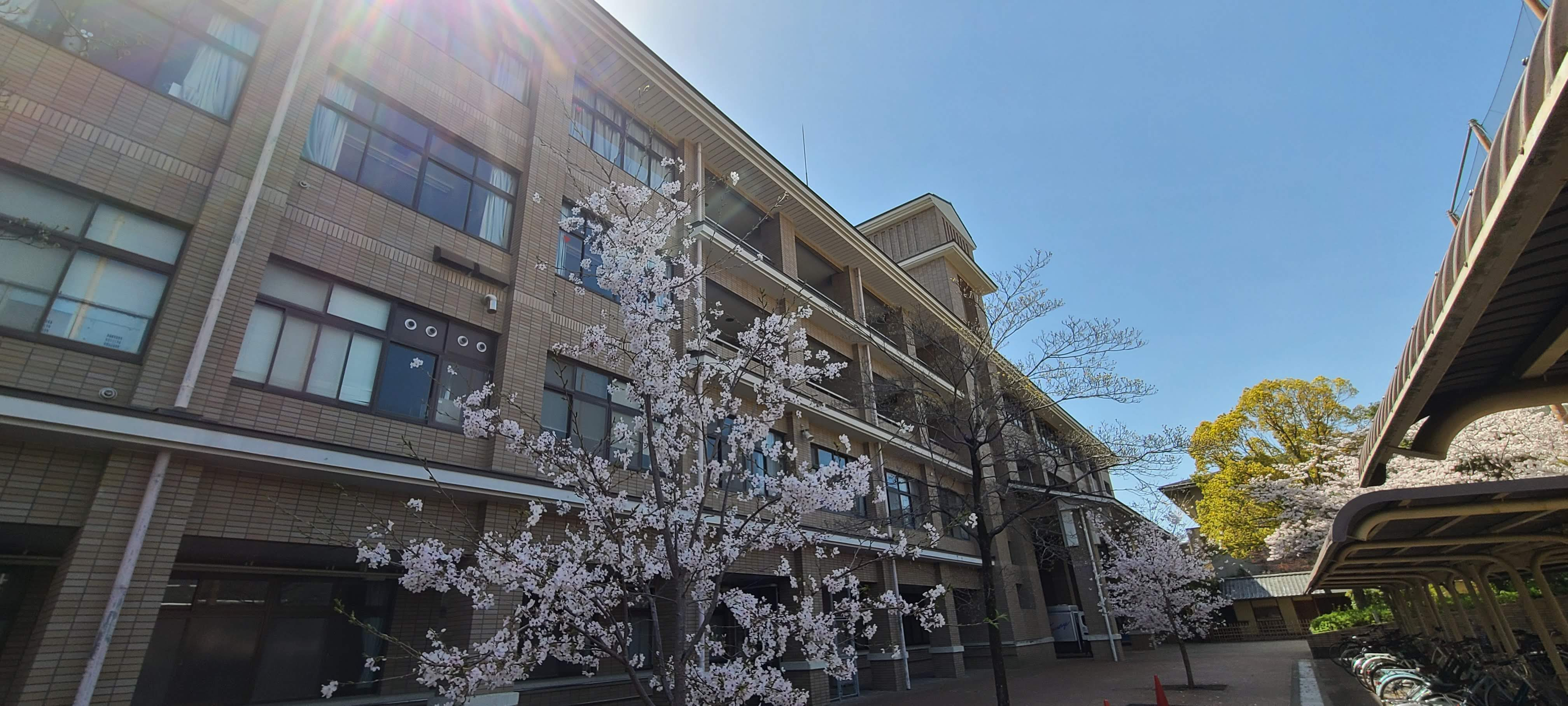
Sagano High School Main Building

Brief Timeline:

- 1941 – Sagano was founded as Sagano Girl's High School
- 1950 – Sagano was re-structured as Sagano High School and became a co-ed school
- 1996 – Kyoto's COSMOS courses were established and added to the school's curriculum and plan
- 2010 – 70th Anniversary Celebration school year
- 2012 – Sagano is officially designated as a Super Science High School by the Ministry of Education, Culture, Sports, Science and Technology for a period of 5 years
- 2014 – Sagano is officially designated as a Super Global High School by the Ministry of Education, Culture, Sports, Science and Technology for a period of 5 years
- 2014 – Sagano is officially designated as a UNESCO Associated Schools Network UNESCO ASPNet school by UNESCO
- 2017 – Sagano is officially re-designated as a Super Science High School by the Ministry of Education, Culture, Sports, Science and Technology for a period of 5 years
- 2022 – Sagano is officially re-designated as a Super Science High School by the Ministry of Education, Culture, Sports, Science and Technology for a period of 5 years

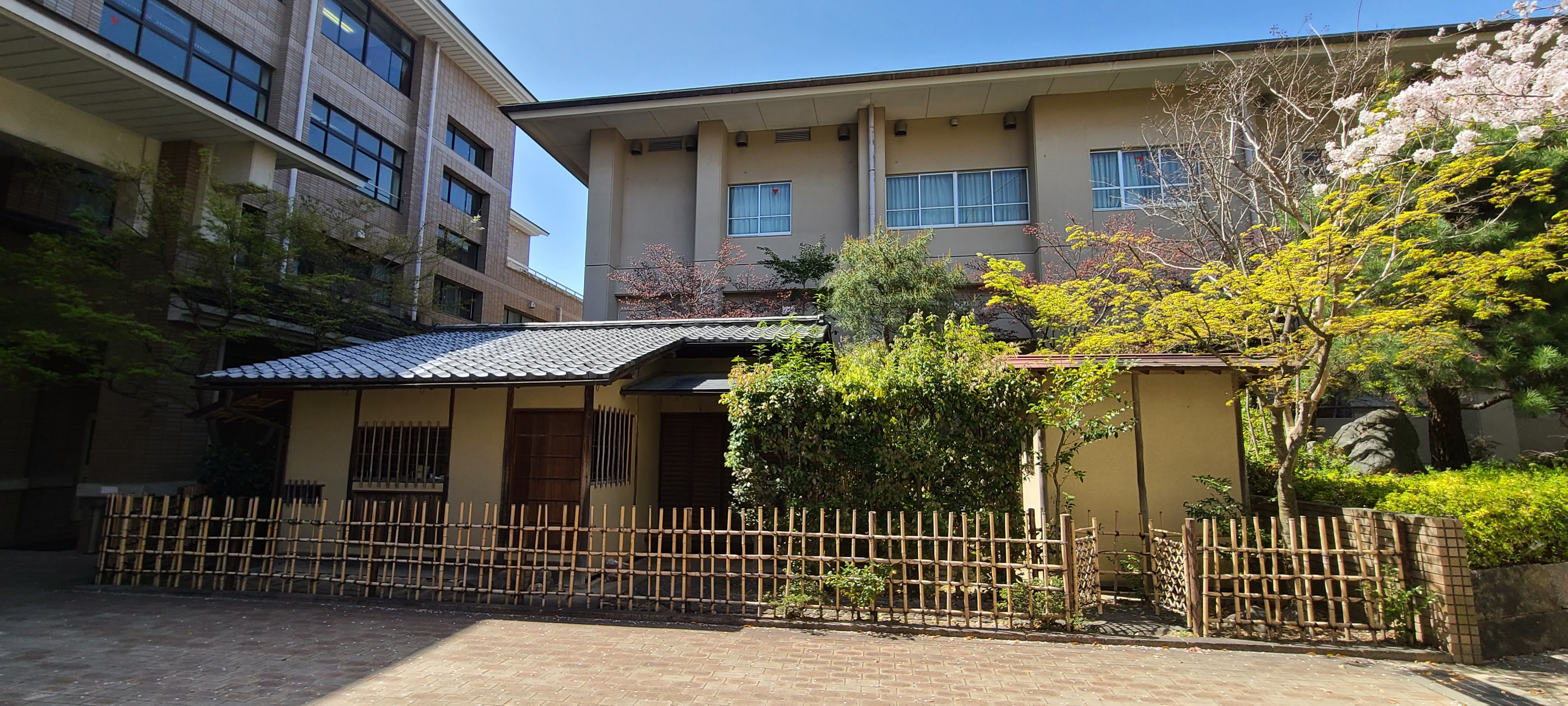
Sagano High School Teahouse Building

Originally opening as “Sagano Girls' High School” in 1941 and becoming co-ed in 1950, Sagano High School has a history of more than 70 years. It is located in the north-western section of the ancient capital of Kyoto, with areas such as Sagano and Arashiyama being located nearby.

The school has two departments, the “General Academic Course” and the “Kyoto Cosmos Course,” the latter of which is a special department established in 1996 in order to provide more advanced-level education which could prepare students for further academic research at universities or other higher educational institutions.

Starting in 2027, the school will all function under the “Kyoto Cosmos Course," and the General Program will be eliminated.

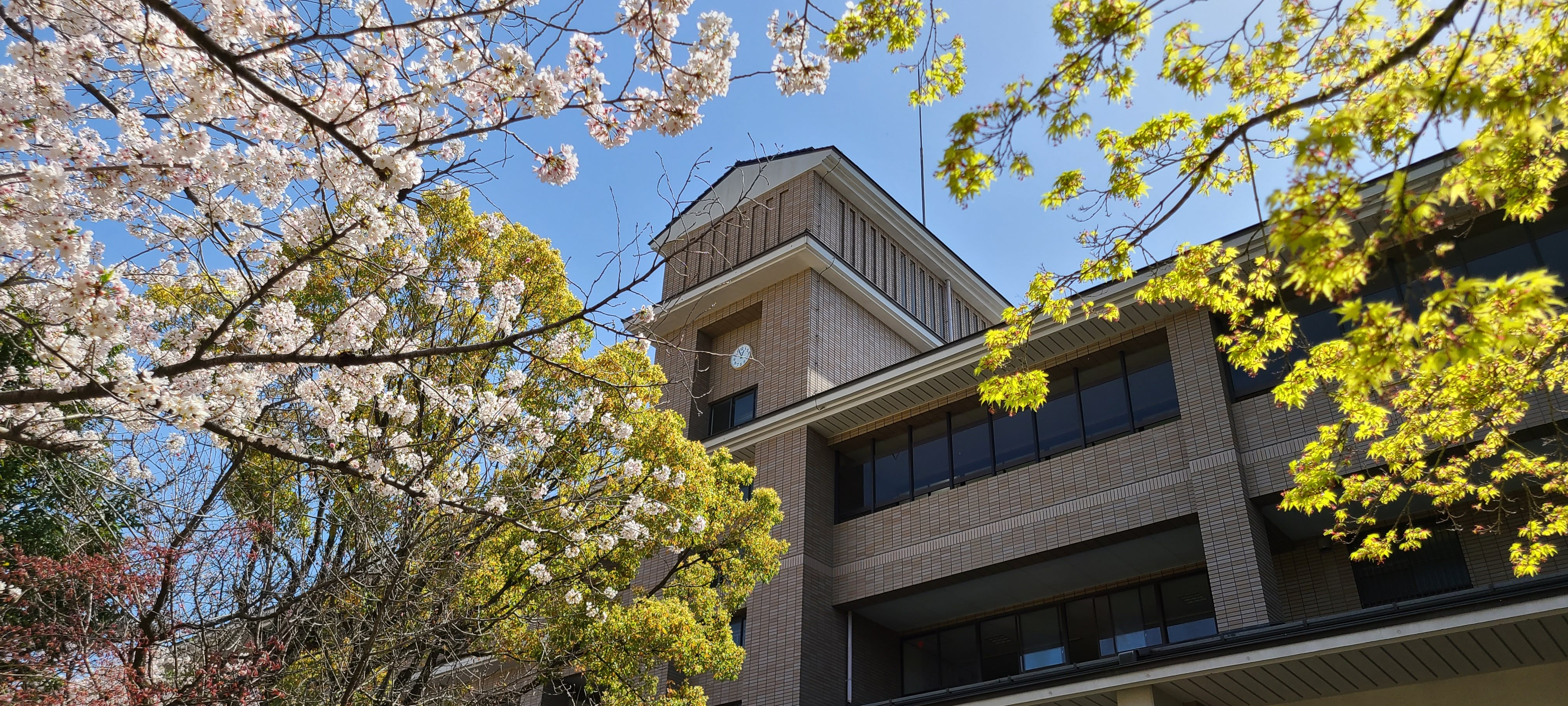
Sagano High School Main Building Clocktower

== Symbol ==
The Sagano High School symbol also functions as its logo. It consists of a box-shaped S with two diamonds behind it. The shape of the diamonds is supposed to make one think of the double-peak Narabigaoka mountain, which you can see from the school building.

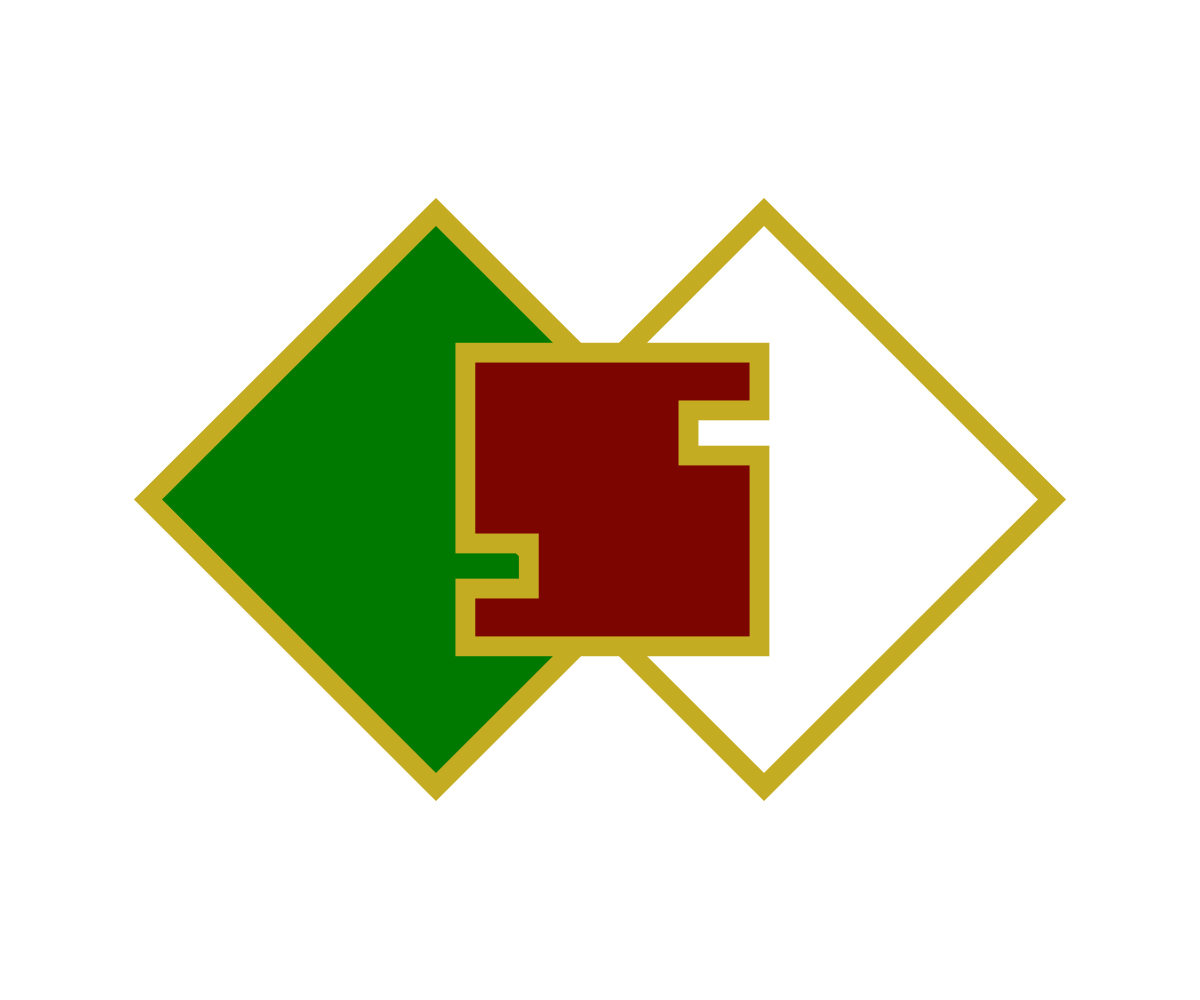
Kyoto Prefectural Sagano High School Logo

== Typical course, class, and school description ==
Sagano High School has two different program departments, the Kyoto Cosmos Department and General Studies Department. The Kyoto Cosmos Department includes three programs of study, the Super Science High track, a humanities track, and a social-science track.

The school was designated as a “Super Science High School” by the Ministry of Education, Culture, Sports, Science and Technology (MEXT) in 2012 for a 5-year period. The school was again re-authorized for another 5-year period in 2017. This designation calls for the school to be "a hub school for science and mathematics education". As such a school, Sagano collaborates with nearby Kyoto University and other research institutions and providing advanced education in the field of natural sciences.

The school was designated as a “Super Global High School” by MEXT in 2014. The research and development focus for this designation will be "Fostering leaders through Kyoto Global Studies utilizing local educational resources and in cooperation with overseas institutes."

Lessons in the Kyoto Cosmos Department are to feature various kinds of unique activities to help develop students’ logical thinking, deep insight and judgment through collaboration with universities and research institutions. Students do small-group research in teams and pick an area of specialization. Students have an opportunity to do hands-on fieldwork, participate in a lecture series, and work on academic research projects and presentations.

Most students participate in clubs, i.e. extra curricular activities, including sports clubs and culture related clubs.

The school conducts various exchange programs with international schools as well.

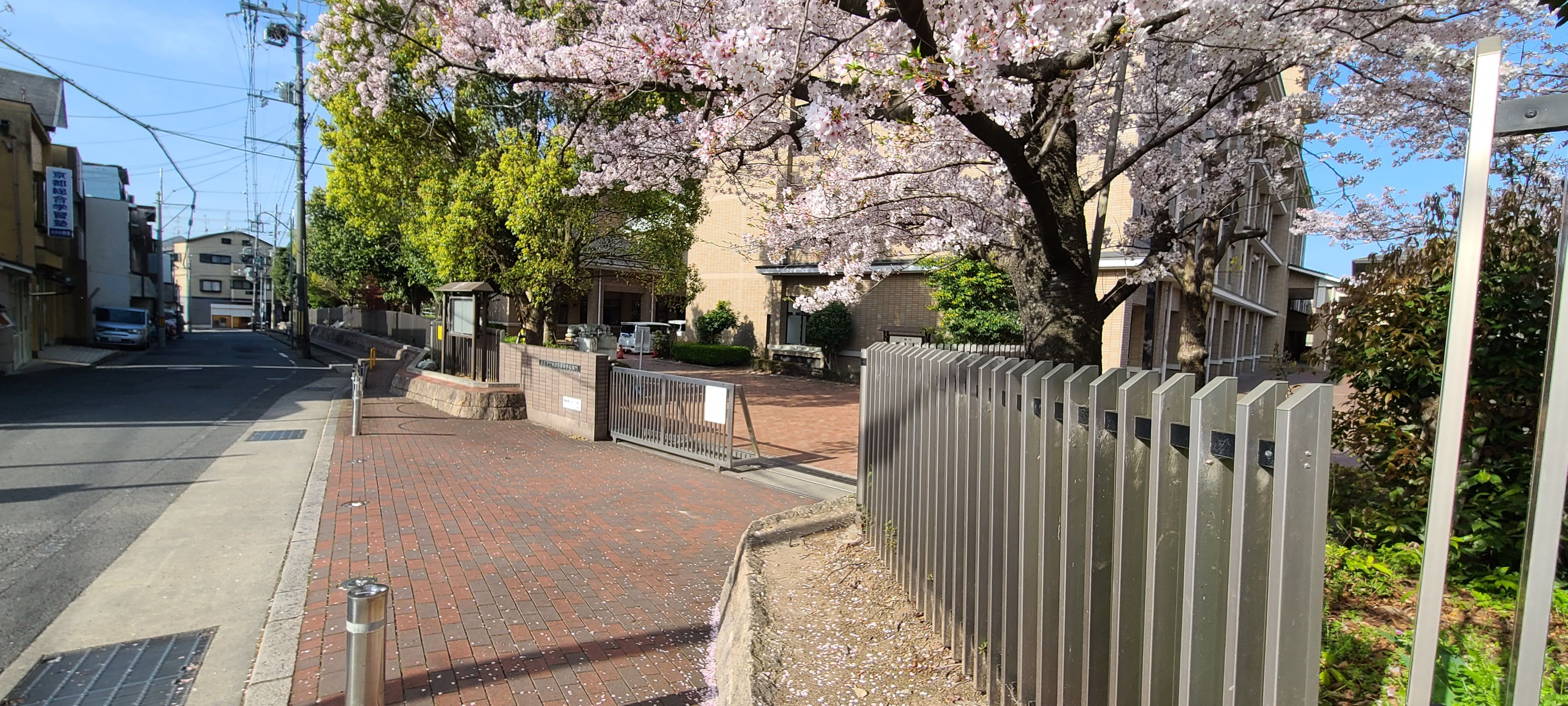
Sagano High School East Gate Road View

== See also ==
- Super Science High Schools in Japan
- Secondary education in Japan
- Higher education in Japan
