= Super Science High School =

Super Science High School (SSH) is a designation awarded by the Japanese Ministry of Education, Culture, Sports, Science and Technology (MEXT) to upper secondary schools that prioritize science, technology, and mathematics. The program was launched as part of its "Science Literacy Enhancement Initiatives" in 2002. Schools with this status receive increased funding and are encouraged to develop links with universities and other academic institutions.

In 2002, the first year of operation, 26 out of 77 applicant schools were awarded SSH status . As of 2006 there are 99 schools with the designation. 204 highschools are designated as SSH in 2014. Highschools designated as SSH receive aid from Japan Science and Technology Agency (JST). The support ranges from buying equipment to managing poster sessions. Main activities of SSH are academic studies in highschool and meetings where students present them to other highschools students, teachers, and professors. There are many other activities such as field work, visit to laboratories or museum, and correlation with highschool in other countries as well. A budget for SSH was about 700 million yen (≒7 million dollars) in 2002, but it has been increasing and it was 2.4 billion yen (≒24 million dollars) in 2011.

== History ==
In 2002, in order to increase the number of people who are good at science and can play active roles all over the world, Ministry of Education, Culture, Sports, Science and Technology started the system of super science high school. Since 2002, every year some high schools are authorized as super science high schools, and now 2014 the total number of them is 204. Before 2005, the period of authorization of SSH was for 3 years, but since 2005 it has been extended to 5 years.

== Activities ==
=== Study ===
Students of SSH are expected to be advanced researchers, so they learn many things. Not only ordinary subjects (Math, Biology, Physics), many of the students in SSH carry out scientific researches. They present their results to students in other schools, teachers, and professors. Many local meetings take place in each region every year, and the national meeting is held every summer. From 2011, the national meeting is held in Yokohama, and 3500 people participated in the meeting.

=== Cooperation with universities ===
As mentioned, professors give some advice to students in the meeting. Also, some highschools invite researchers carrying out cutting edge researches to their school and ask them to give lectures and interact with students. Many highschools give students chances to visit laboratories, museums, and institutes as well.

== About authorization of Super Science Highschool ==
According to the guideline of Ministry of Education, Culture, Sports, Science and Technology, as follows:

- Management institutions, such as public or private high schools, which wish to be authorized as Super Science Highschool, must submit an application to Ministry of Education, Culture, Sports, Science and Technology through the governor or the board of education of the prefecture.
- Ministry of Education, Culture, Sports, Science and Technology screens the application and authorizes the school as SSH if it seems to be proper.
- Japan Science and Technology Agency, independent administrative corporation, supports the SSH by spending money which is necessary to research and invent.
- The period of authorization of SSH is 5 years as a general rule.
- Every year, management institutions must report achievements and results of SSH to Ministry of Education, Culture, Sports, Science and Technology.
- Minister of Ministry of Education, Culture, Sports, Science and Technology takes measures against SSH, including cancelling the authorizing of SSH, if the contents of researching of SSH do not accord to the purpose of SSH system or are improper.

== Current Super Science High Schools ==
- Chienkan Super Science High School, Saga Prefecture
- Koshi High School, Fukui Prefecture
- Wakasa High School, Fukui Prefecture
- Mizusawa Super Science High School, Iwate Prefecture
- Hitachi Daiichi High School, Ibaraki Prefecture
- Sagano Super Science High School, Kyoto Prefecture
- Senri High School, Osaka Prefecture
- Tennoji High School, Osaka Prefecture
- Okayama Ichinomiya High School, Okayama Prefecture

== See also ==
- Education in Japan
