= Sharon Au =

Former Singaporean actress and host (born 1975)

- Born: 13 August 1975 (age 51); Singapore
- Education: Waseda University
- Occupations: Host, actress
- Years active: 1995–2018
- Agent: Mediacorp

Chinese name
- Traditional Chinese: 歐菁仙
- Simplified Chinese: 欧菁仙
Transcriptions
Standard Mandarin
- Hanyu Pinyin: Ōu Jīngxiān

Sharon Au (simplified Chinese: 欧菁仙; traditional Chinese: 歐菁仙; pinyin: Ōu Jīngxiān; born 13 August 1975) is a Singaporean former actress and host. Having joined the TCS during the mid-1990s, she won many awards as an artiste with MediaCorp before taking a sabbatical to pursue university education in 2005 on a scholarship. She returned to MediaCorp to serve her scholarship bond upon graduation in 2011, taking up an office executive position. Nonetheless, she was still invited to host at televised events and theatres.

In February 2018, she resigned amicably from MediaCorp. In October 2018, she found an overseas job as an investment director in a private equity firm based in Paris, France.

== Early life and education ==
She said in an interview that she grew up in a humble and modest apartment, and she is very close to her mother. She also said that she has moderate scoliosis since young, and needs a medical bed at home for her spinal condition.

Au attended CHIJ Saint Nicholas Girls' School (Secondary) and Hwa Chong Junior College in Singapore. She graduated from Waseda University in Tokyo with a Bachelor of Liberal Arts degree in 2011.

On Christmas Day 2023, Au lost her father at age 74.

== Career ==
Her first job after her GCE 'A' levels was a flight stewardess with Singapore Airlines, Au's career in the entertainment industry began when she was talent-spotted from a Toy Factory Productions English remake of a Hong Kong stage musical I Have A Date With Spring. During the late 1990s she was best known for co-hosting City Beat with Kym Ng and Bryan Wong. She played numerous roles ranging from a cabaret girl in the stage musical, Beauty World to an enthusiastic radio presenter in the sitcom Right Frequency, each receiving rave reviews.

Effectively multilingual, Au established herself amongst top emcee-hosts in Mediacorp alongside Quan Yi Fong and Guo Liang. This is further endorsed when she clinched the Star Awards for Best Variety Show Host for four consecutive years from 2000 to 2003.

Au took a break during the peak of her career and went to Japan for her undergraduate studies in 2005 in the School of International Liberal Studies, Waseda University in Tokyo on a MediaCorp scholarship. She also went to Jean Moulin University Lyon 3 in France for a year as part of Waseda University's One-Year international Exchange Program. Au is multilingual, as she speaks English, Chinese, Japanese, French and basic Spanish.

Au was invited back on a few occasions to be host for some key events, including being the host in Beijing for Singapore Prime Minister's first state visit there and Star Awards 2007. In April 2011, she went back to MediaCorp to serve her 6-year bond. She played host for President Star Charity show in 2012. She made a significant mark in her forties, being one of the 3 key hosts in SEA Games in Singapore's home ground. However, she had been accused of mimicking an Indian accent during the SEA Games opening ceremony. She responded the next day on her Facebook page and apologised the following day. In the same year; she played the female lead, Madam Kwa Geok Choo, in The LKY Musical, alongside actor Adrian Pang, for 37 shows in the Marina Sands Theatre.

In 2012, she started and led styleXstyle.com (a property of MediaCorp Pte Ltd), focusing fashion, beauty and lifestyle. In 2016, she co-founded the Style by Style Vibes cafe when the new Mediacorp campus opened. In 2017, she was appointed as the Publisher for ELLE Singapore as part of Mediacorp's move from print to digital for its print medium.

On 4 January 2018, it was announced that her last day of service in Mediacorp would be on 1 February 2018. styleXstyle.com was later absorbed in 8 Days and ELLE Singapore ended January of the same year. Intending to take a year of sabbatical, she instead applied for a job at a private equity firm after spending two months in Paris, France. Since October 2018, she is currently an investment director with the private equity firm in Paris.

== Drama ==
- 1997
  - 第三类剧场III之油鬼仔 Tales of the 3rd Kind III
  - 心结(电视电影) Hidden Scars
- 1998
  - 播音人 Right Frequency
- 1999
  - 播音人II Right Frequency II
- 2000
  - 新心关系 Soho@Work
  - 播音人III Right Frequency III
- 2001
  - 大酒店 The Hotel
- 2002
  - 发财八百万 Lucky Numbers
  - 春到人间 Springs of Life
- 2004
  - 孩有明天
  - 偶像·爸爸 Oh Dad!
- 2005
  - Tiramisu

== Variety shows ==
- 1995
  - 欢乐大放送 Entertainment Beat
  - 宜康之夜 Econ Night
  - 环岛追追追 Singapore Fun Discovery
  - 午后闲情 Afternoon Leisure Hour
- 1996
  - 鼠来宝喜迎春 Lunar New Year Special
  - 宜康之夜 Econ Night
  - 欢乐大放送 Entertainment Beat
  - 娱乐新天地 Sunday Variety
  - TCS Staff Dinner Show
  - Samsung Show
  - 总统星光慈善 President's Star Charity
  - 搞笑行动 Comedy Night
  - 群星照亮千万心 NKF Charity Show
  - TCS Olympics Opening/Closing
  - 环岛追追追 Singapore Fun Discovery
  - 欢乐周末夜 Weekend Delight
  - Eversoft Show
  - Talent Search Semi-final Show
- 1997
  - 搞笑行动 Comedy Night
  - 宜康之夜 Econ Night
  - 早安您好 Good Morning Singapore
  - Kid's Camp
  - 金牛贺岁迎新春 Lunar New Year Show
  - 总统星光慈善 President's Star Charity
  - 环岛追追追 Singapore Fun Discovery
  - 非一般年轻 In Generation
  - 群星照亮千万心 NKF Charity Show
  - 才华横溢出新秀 Star Search Final
  - 超级老街坊 Truly Streetwise
  - 欢乐周末夜 Weekend Delight
  - Great World City Show
- 1998
  - 做做朋友 Let's Be Friends
  - 城人杂志 City Beat
  - 虎啸春到嘻洋洋 Lunar New Year Show
  - 歌舞欢腾贺新春 All-Star Variety Show
  - 宜康之夜 Econ Night
  - 群星照亮千万心 NKF Charity Show
  - 总统星光慈善 President's Star Charity
- 1999
  - 城人杂志City Beat
  - 玉兔贺岁迎丰年 Lunar New Year Show
  - 歌舞欢腾贺新春 All-Star Variety Show
  - 妆艺游行 Chingay '99
  - 群星照亮千万心 NKF Charity Show
  - 欢乐周末夜 Weekend Delight
  - 歌舞今宵 Yesterday Once More
  - National Day Parade
  - 全星展艺献温情 MCS All-Stars Charity
  - Millennium Swing Singapore
- 2000
  - 城人杂志City Beat
  - 千禧祥龙迎新春 Lunar New Year Show
  - 歌舞欢腾贺新春 All-Star Variety Show
  - 欢乐周末夜 Weekend Delight
  - National Day Parade
  - 群星照亮千万心 NKF Charity Show
  - 心手相连 Affairs of the Heart
- 2001
  - 城人杂志City Beat
  - 千禧祥龙迎新春 Lunar New Year Show
  - 歌舞欢腾贺新春 All-Star Variety Show
  - 名人Tic Tac Toe Celebrity Squares
  - 群星照亮千万心 NKF Charity Show
  - 欢乐周末夜 Weekend Delight
  - 才华横溢出新秀 Star Search Final
  - 总统星光慈善 President's Star Charity
  - National Day Parade
- 2002
  - 城人杂志 City Beat
  - 群星照亮千万心 NKF Charity Show
  - 名人Tic Tac Toe Celebrity Squares
  - 欢乐周末夜 Weekend Delight
  - 名人TicTacToe III TicTacToe III
  - 名人TicTacToe特辑 TicTacToe Special
  - National Day Parade
  - 城人杂志 新系列
- 2003
  - 佳居情缘 Living Room
  - 金童玉女心碰心 Perfect Match
  - National Day Parade
  - 欢乐周末夜 Weekend Delight
  - 才华横溢出新秀 2003 总决赛 Star Search 2003 Finals
- 2004
  - 群星照亮千万心2004 NKF Charity Show 2004
  - 物物大交换 Barter Trade
  - 道地美食大搜寻 Malaysia Road Feast
  - 威力无比加油战 Spring N Slide
  - 不说你不知 Trivia Trove
  - 普威之夜 2004 PSC Nite 2004
  - National Day Parade
  - 全情真爱满童心 Children Medical Fund Charity Show
  - 澳妙新滋味 Flavours of Australia
- 2005
  - 天鸡报喜贺新春 Lunar New Year's Eve Variety Special
  - 群星照亮千万心2005 NKF Charity Show 2005
  - 也许或者有可能II I'm the One
  - 街头美食星 Star Choice
  - 乐在台湾 Naruwan Taiwan
  - National Day Parade
- 2007
  - 红星大奖 2007 Star Awards 2007
- 2011
  - National Day Parade
- 2012
  - National Day Parade
  - 总统星光慈善 President's Star Charity 2012
- 2015
  - 28th Southeast Asian Games

== Theatre ==
- I Have a Date with Spring (in English and Mandarin, 我和春天有个约会), Toy Factory Productions, Singapore, 1995
- Beauty World (in Mandarin, 美丽新世界), MediaCorp, Singapore, 1998
- Storm (in Mandarin, 雷雨), Toy Factory Productions, Singapore, 1998
- A Tinted Edge (in Mandarin, 角色), Toy Factory Productions, Singapore Arts Festival, Singapore, 2000
- Chessmaster (in Mandarin, 棋人), Toy Factory Productions, Singapore, 2002
- Happy Ghost (in Mandarin, 開心鬼), Spring-Time Stage Productions, Singapore, 2003
- The LKY Musical, Metropolitan Productions, Singapore, 2015

== Awards and nominations ==
Organisation	Year	Category	Nominated work	Result	Ref
Star Awards	1997	Best Newcomer	—N/a	Nominated	
Star Awards	1997	Top 10 Most Popular Female Artistes	—N/a	Nominated	
Star Awards	1998	Best Variety Show Host	NKF Charity Show 1998	Nominated	
Star Awards	1998	Top 10 Most Popular Female Artistes	—N/a	Nominated	
Star Awards	1999	Best Variety Show Host	City Beat	Nominated	
Star Awards	1999	Best Comedy Performer	Right Frequency	Nominated	
Star Awards	1999	Top 10 Most Popular Female Artistes	—N/a	Won	
Star Awards	2000	Best Variety Show Host	City Beat	Won	
Star Awards	2000	Best Comedy Performer	Soho@Work	Nominated	
Star Awards	2000	Top 10 Most Popular Female Artistes	—N/a	Won	
Star Awards	2001	Best Variety Show Host	City Beat	Won	
Star Awards	2001	Best Comedy Performer	Right Frequency 3	Won	
Star Awards	2001	Top 10 Most Popular Female Artistes	—N/a	Won	
Star Awards	2002	Best Variety Show Host	City Beat	Won	
Star Awards	2002	Top 10 Most Popular Female Artistes	—N/a	Won	
Star Awards	2003	Best Variety Show Host	City Beat	Won	
Star Awards	2003	Top 10 Most Popular Female Artistes	—N/a	Won	
Star Awards	2004	Best Variety Show Host	Spring N Slide	Nominated	
Star Awards	2004	Top 10 Most Popular Female Artistes	—N/a	Won	
