= Touch Screen Cuisine =

- 弹指间的料理
- Genre: Variety cooking
- Presented by: Vivian Lai; Ben Yeo
- Voices of: Kenneth Chung
- Country of origin: Singapore
- Original language: Mandarin
- No. of episodes: 12 (list of episodes)

Production
- Producer: Elaine See 施意玲
- Running time: 30 minutes (with advertisements)

Original release
- Network: Mediacorp Channel 8
- Release: April 6 – June 22, 2016

Related
- Chef On Wheels; What's In The Fridge?

Touch Screen Cuisine (Chinese: 弹指间的料理) is a variety cooking show produced by Mediacorp Channel 8 and hosted by Vivian Lai and Ben Yeo. It began its run on 6 April 2016, every Wednesday at 8.00p.m.

== Guests ==
Episode	Recipe	Guest Artiste(s)	Food Blogger	Votes	Original Air Date
1	Steamed Cabbage Rolls	Dennis Chew	Sharon Lam	7 Likes; 3 Comments	April 6, 2016
2	One-Pot Garlic Black Pepper Chicken Pasta	Sheila Sim	Diana Gale	8 Likes; 1 Comment	April 13, 2016
3	Teochew Png Kuih	Kym Ng	Kenneth Goh	9 Likes	April 20, 2016
4	Olaf Curry Bento	Jayley Woo; Hayley Woo	Little Miss Bento (Shirley Wong)	8 Likes; 1 Comment	April 27, 2016
5	Singapore Black Pepper Crab	Jeffrey Xu	Dr. Leslie Tay	4 Likes; 2 Dislikes; 1 Comment	May 4, 2016
6	Ikan Gerang Asam	Quan Yi Fong	Alan Goh	8 Likes; 1 Dislike	May 11, 2016
7	Country Chicken and Mushroom Pie	Carrie Wong	Zoe Liu	5 Likes; 3 Dislikes	May 18, 2016
8	Owl Caramel Cookies	Elvin Ng	Victoria Bakes	6 Likes; 2 Dislikes	May 25, 2016
9	Crayfish Bisque	Wang Weiliang	Alvin See	6 Likes; 2 Dislikes	June 1, 2016
10	Steamed Ribs in Pumpkin	Jeremy Chan	Peng	8 Likes	June 8, 2016
11	Hakka Abacus Beads	Cavin Soh	Annie Mok	7 Likes; 1 Dislike	June 15, 2016
12	Chawanmushi	Paige Chua	Tan Sulyn	5 Likes; 3 Dislikes	June 22, 2016
