= Star Awards for Best Programme Host =

Singaporean television award

Star Awards for Best Programme Host 最佳综艺及资讯节目主持人
- Awarded for: Best Performance by a Host for a Programme
- Country: Singapore
- Presented by: Mediacorp
- First award: 2016
- Most recent winner: Guo Liang — Star Awards 2025 Award Ceremony (2026)

Highlights
- Most awards: Quan Yi Fong (6)
- Most nominations: Quan Yi Fong (8)

The Star Awards for Best Programme Host is an award presented annually at the Star Awards, a ceremony that was established in 1994.

The category was introduced in 2016, at the 22nd Star Awards ceremony; Lee Teng received the award for his performance in Love on the Plate 3 and it is given in honour of a Mediacorp host who has delivered an outstanding performance in a variety show, info-ed or infotainment programme. The nominees are determined by a team of judges employed by Mediacorp; winners are selected by a majority vote from the entire judging panel.

The award combined the previous categories for Best Variety Show Host and Best Info-Ed Programme Host. The restructuring of these categories was a result of the award ceremony organising committee's wish to eliminate the distinctions between variety and info-ed programme hosting performances.

Since its inception, the Star Awards for Best Programme Host have been awarded to three different hosts. Guo Liang is the most recent winner, receiving the award for his performance in Star Awards 2025 Award Ceremony. Quan Yi Fong remains the only host to have won the award six times, a record she has held since the 2024 ceremony. She also holds the record for most nominations, with nine total, including a double nomination in 2021. Bryan Wong holds the record for the most nominations without a win, having been nominated five times.

== Recipients ==
Year	Host	Work title	Nominees	Ref.
2016	Lee Teng	Love on the Plate 3	Guo Liang — What Your School Doesn't Teach You; Kate Pang — Face Off!; Pornsak — Ge Tai Challenge; Quan Yi Fong — Celeb's Curated Collections	
2017	Quan Yi Fong	Markets in Asia	Guo Liang — Your Thoughts, Please; Lee Teng — The 4 Chefs; Desmond Ng — BENGpire; Bryan Wong — Hear Me Out 2	
2018	Quan Yi Fong	Unique Lodging	Felicia Chin — Going Miles, Spreading Smiles; Guo Liang — Voices; Lee Teng — Fixer; Kym Ng — Ah Ma Can Cook	
2019	Quan Yi Fong	Fixer 2	Chen Hanwei — Away with My BFF; Dennis Chew — Dennis Uncovers; Desmond Ng — Thrift Hunters; Bryan Wong — Hear Me Out 4	
2021	Quan Yi Fong	Hear U Out	Chen Hanwei — House Everything?; Guo Liang — The Destined One 2; Kym Ng — Ah Gong Can Cook; Quan Yi Fong — YiFong & Eleanor's Kitchen; Cavin Soh — King of Culinary 2; Tung Soo Hua — Be My Guest 2	
2022	Quan Yi Fong	Hear U Out S2	Guo Liang — The Inner Circle; Ke Le — Curious City; Desmond Ng — Curious City; Kym Ng — Old Taste Detective 2	
2023	Christopher Lee	Dishing with Chris Lee	Dennis Chew — Mr Zhou's Ghost Stories @ Singapore Sightings; Darren Lim — A Night Under the Stars; Quan Yi Fong — Hear U Out 3; Bryan Wong — Old Taste Detective 3	
2024	Quan Yi Fong	Hear U Out S4	Chen Shucheng — Foodie Trio; Guo Liang — The Zoe and Liang Show; Darren Lim — Fixer 4; Kym Ng — Old Taste Detective 4	
2025	Christopher Lee	Dishing With Chris Lee S2	Bryan Wong — Makan On Wheels; Hazelle Teo — Star Awards 2024 - Walk of Fame; Jeremy Chan — Double J BAEcation; Joanne Peh — A Conversation with Minister	
2026	Guo Liang	Star Awards 2025 Award Ceremony	Bryan Wong - Makan On Wheels S2; Darren Lim - Unusual Weddings; Dennis Chew - Mr Zhou's Ghost Stories @ Singapore Sightings S2; Xixi Lim - Say It Right! S2	

== Nominees distribution chart ==
Colour key
Host won the award
Host was nominated for the award
Host was not nominated for the award
Host is currently nominated for the award

Host	Year										Wins	Noms
Host	2016	2017	2018	2019	2021	2022	2023	2024	2025	2026	Wins	Noms
Quan Yi Fong	N	1	2	3	4	5	N	6			6	9
Christopher Lee							1		2		2	2
Lee Teng	1	N	N								1	3
Guo Liang	N	N	N		N	N		N		1	1	7
Bryan Wong		N		N			N		N	N	0	5
Kym Ng			N		N	N		N			0	4
Desmond Ng		N		N		N					0	3
Dennis Chew				N			N			N	0	3
Darren Lim							N	N		N	0	3
Chen Hanwei				N	N						0	2
Kate Pang	N										0	1
Pornsak	N										0	1
Felicia Chin			N								0	1
Cavin Soh					N						0	1
Tung Soo Hua					N						0	1
Ke Le						N					0	1
Chen Shucheng								N			0	1
Hazelle Teo									N		0	1
Jeremy Chan									N		0	1
Joanne Peh									N		0	1
Xixi Lim										N	0	1

== Award records ==
Record	Host	Count	Remarks
Most wins	Quan Yi Fong	6 wins	2017, 2018, 2019, 2021, 2022, 2024
Most nominations	Quan Yi Fong	9 nominations	2016, 2017, 2018, 2019, 2021, 2022, 2023, 2024
Longest gap between wins	Quan Yi Fong	2 years	2019–2021
Consecutive wins	Quan Yi Fong	5 wins	2017, 2018, 2019, 2021, 2022
Most nominations before first award	Guo Liang	6 nominations	Won first award (7th nomination) in 2026
Most nominations without a win	Bryan Wong	5 nominations	2017, 2019, 2023, 2025, 2026
Longest gap between nominations	Dennis Chew	4 years	2019–2023
Longest gap between nominations	Bryan Wong	4 years	2019–2023
Most consecutive nominations	Quan Yi Fong	9 nominations	2016, 2017, 2018, 2019, 2021, 2022, 2023, 2024
Won at first nomination	Lee Teng	2 hosts	2016
Won at first nomination	Christopher Lee	2 hosts	2023
Nominated twice in the same year	Quan Yi Fong	1 host	2021
Won Best Variety Show Host and Best Programme Host	Quan Yi Fong	1 host	2005, 2014 (Best Variety Show Host); 2017, 2018, 2019, 2021, 2022 (Best Programme Host)
Won Best Info-Ed Programme Host and Best Programme Host	Lee Teng	2 hosts	2012 (Best Info-Ed Programme Host); 2016 (Best Programme Host)
Won Best Info-Ed Programme Host and Best Programme Host	Quan Yi Fong	2 hosts	2015 (Best Info-Ed Programme Host); 2017, 2018, 2019, 2021, 2022 (Best Programme Host)

== Multiple awards and nominations ==
The following individuals received two or more Best Programme Host awards:

Wins	Host	Nominations
6	Quan Yi Fong 权怡凤	9

Wins	Host	Nominations
2	Christopher Lee 李铭顺	2

The following individuals received two or more Best Programme Host nominations:

Nominations	Host
9	Quan Yi Fong 权怡凤
7	Guo Liang 郭亮
5	Bryan Wong 王禄江
4	Kym Ng 鐘琴
3	Lee Teng 李腾
3	Desmond Ng 黄振隆
3	Dennis Chew 周崇庆
3	Darren Lim 林明伦
2	Chen Hanwei 陈汉玮
2	Christopher Lee 李铭顺
