= S.N.A.P. =

S.N.A.P. (Chinese: 熠熠星光总动员, formally known as 全星总动员) was a Singaporean television talent competition by Channel 8 to find the next star. The show was hosted by Bryan Wong and Kym Ng.

After running for 3 seasons, the producers of the show decided to change show's Chinese title. Similar from previous seasons, contestants are scouted on the streets and shopping malls. The show hosts will be broken into 2 teams to choose their contestants and let the public vote to decide the winner of the different categories each week. This is the 4th installation from the previous seasons, last aired in 2004.

== Hosts ==
Lee Teng and Zhou Ying were confirmed to be joining the show as a new addition while the other team is made up of former season host Bryan Wong and Kym Ng.

== Season 4 Contestants ==
EP	Star Search Theme:	Location	Winner	Date Aired
1.	明星公主	ARC/VivoCity	Fenny Chandra	20 Sept 2012
2.	人气男红星	Wisma Atria	Benjamin Khoh	27 Sept 2012
3.	熟男熟女	Parkway Parade	Diana Tanvis	4 Oct 2012
4.	淘气宝宝	Jurong Point	Audrey Soh	11 Oct 2012
5.	人气女红星	Marina Square	Seraphine Sng	18 Oct 2012
6.	新生代偶像派	Bugis Junction/Bugis +	Alan Chang	25 Oct 2012
7.	超级红星	Tampines 1	Kho Hui Ting	1 Nov 2012
8.	明星公主/ 人气男红星/ 熟男熟女PK战	Wisma Atria Cathay Cineleisure Orchard		
9.	淘气宝宝/ 人气女红星/ 新生代偶像派/ 超级红星PK战	Bugis Junction / CityLink / Marina Square	Finals	15 Nov 2012
