= Star Awards 2022 =

Singaporean television awards

Star Awards 2022 红星大奖 2022
- Sponsored by: Bioskins (Presenter); Eu Yan Sang; Simmons; Livingcare; Holistic-Way; Powerhouse Karaoke Systems; Royal Caribbean Singapore
- Date: 24 April 2022
- Location: MES Theatre @ Mediacorp
- Country: Singapore
- Hosted by: Backstage: Ke Le; Desmond Ng; Seow Sin Nee; Juin Teh; Herman Keh; Gini Chang Walk-of-fame: Lee Teng; Hazelle Teo; Jeremy Chan Main show: Chen Hanwei

Highlights
- Most awards: My Star Bride (3)
- Most nominations: My Star Bride and Key Witness (7 each)
- Best Drama Serial: My Star Bride
- Best Variety Show: The Inner Circle
- Former Awards: All-time Favourite Artiste: Zheng Geping; Dennis Chew

Television/radio coverage
- Network: Mediacorp Channel 8 Mediacorp Channel U meWATCH; YouTube; Astro AEC (Channel 338)
- Runtime: 180 mins (Awards Ceremony); 90 mins (Walk-of-fame)

The Star Awards 2022 ceremony (Chinese: 红星大奖2022), the 27th edition of Star Awards, presented by the Mediacorp, took place on 24 April 2022 at MES Theatre @ Mediacorp. During the gala, Mediacorp presented Star Awards in 15 categories honoring Mediacorp's employees, minor awards in six categories and sponsored awards in one category. Chen Hanwei hosted the show.

Romantic drama My Star Bride won a leading three awards including the Best Drama Serial. Other winners included Recipe Of Life winning two awards; five other shows won one award each.

Two artisites Dennis Chew and Zheng Geping were conferred the All-time Favourite Artiste, while Felicia Chin and Rebecca Lim won their tenth Top 10 Most Favourite Artiste, the latter being the ninth celebrity to win the Top 10 award for ten consecutive times.

== Telecast ==
The 2022 ceremony was broadcast live on meWATCH, Mediacorp Channel U, Mediacorp Channel 8 and YouTube from 7pm to 10pm on 24 April 2022. There was an exclusive live commentary broadcast on meWATCH from 3:30pm to 10:30pm. A repeat telecast of the Star Awards 2022 will be aired from 2pm to 6.30pm on 1 May 2022 on Mediacorp Channel 8.

Date	Shows	Time	Channels	Country	Remarks
24 April 2022	Live Commentary	3.30 pm to 10.30 pm	meWATCH	Singapore	Live Telecast
24 April 2022	Walk-of-fame; Awards Ceremony	5.00 to 6.30pm 7:00pm to 10:00pm	Mediacorp Channel 8	Singapore	Live Telecast
24 April 2022	Walk-of-fame; Awards Ceremony	5.00 to 6.30pm 7:00pm to 10:00pm	Mediacorp Channel U	Singapore	Live Telecast
24 April 2022	Walk-of-fame; Awards Ceremony	5.00 to 6.30pm 7:00pm to 10:00pm	meWATCH	Singapore	Live Telecast
24 April 2022	Walk-of-fame; Awards Ceremony	5.00 to 6.30pm 7:00pm to 10:00pm	YouTube	Singapore	Live Telecast
24 April 2022	Walk-of-fame; Awards Ceremony	5.00 to 6.30pm 7:00pm to 10:00pm	Astro AEC Channel 338	Malaysia	Live Telecast
24 April 2022	Walk-of-fame; Awards Ceremony	5.00 to 6.30pm 7:00pm to 10:00pm	Astro Go	Malaysia	Live Telecast
1 May 2022	Walk-of-fame; Awards Ceremony	2.00pm to 6.30pm	Mediacorp Channel 8	Singapore	Repeat Telecast
21 January 2023	Awards Ceremony	5.00pm to 7.30pm	8TV	Malaysia	CNY Eve Special Telecast
23 January 2023	Awards Ceremony	7.00am to 9.00am	8TV	Malaysia	Repeat Telecast

== Nominees and awards ==
=== Awards ===
Winners are listed first and highlighted in boldface. (Note: Backstage Creative Awards were presented outside the award ceremony with the Best Screenplay winner My Star Bride, written by Chan Yoke Yeng, the Best Director goes to Loh Woon Woon for Key Witness, Ng Jin Puay from The Food Lab won the award for Best variety research writer, and Kang Lay See won the Best Variety Producer award for Curious City.)

**Best Drama Serial 最佳戏剧**: **My Star Bride**; Crouching Tiger Hidden Ghost; Mind Jumper; Soul Old Yet So Young; The Takedown	**Best Radio Programme**: **LOVE 972 - The Breakfast Quartet**; YES 933 - The DAKA Show; LOVE 972 - Mr Zhou's Ghost Stories; YES 933 - The Shuang and Kunz Show; CAPITAL 958 - Wake-up Call
**Best Short-Form Drama Series**: **Mr Zhou's Ghost Stories@Job Haunting**; 321 Action!; iKid, You Not!; The Amazing Showman; Wheels	**Best Short-Form Variety Programme**: **Storyteller Behind The Wheels**; JustSwipeLah; Dare to Try; Hello Big Shots!; Superman Juniors
**Best Entertainment Programme**: **The Inner Circle**; Creme De La Creme; Curious City; Hear U Out S2; Towkay, Take a Break	**Best Infotainment Programme**: **Cooking For A Cause**; Faces of Asia; One In A Thousand; Tuesday Report: The Towkays S3; We Came This Far
**Best Entertainment Special**: **Star Awards 2021 - Awards Ceremony**; Lunar New Year's Eve Special 2021; River Hongbao 2021; Star Awards 2021 - Backstage Live : Artistes' Preparation; Star Awards 2021 - Walk of Fame	**Best Theme Song**: **Jocie Guo - My Star Bride《温习》**; Jeremy Chan - Crouching Tiger Hidden Ghost 《乱掉》; Alfred Sim - CTRL《反话》; AL4HA - Key Witness《你的呼唤》; Chantalle Ng, Tasha Low, Ferlyn Wong, Abigail, Latonia Tay - Live Your Dreams《是谁》
**Best Actor**: **Chen Hanwei - Recipe of Life as Zhou Beifa**; Desmond Tan - Key Witness as Chen Zhiming; Jeremy Chan - Crouching Tiger Hidden Ghost as Ma Da; Romeo Tan - Soul Old Yet So Young as Shi Wenfeng; Xu Bin - My Star Bride as Chung Shee Jie	**Best Actress**: **Huang Biren - Recipe of Life as Chen Huiying**; Chantalle Ng - My Star Bride as Mai Phương Thảo; Jesseca Liu - Crouching Tiger Hidden Ghost as Lin Xiaofang; Joanne Peh - Mind Jumper as Khoo Kaile; Ya Hui - CTRL as Liang Siyun
**Best Supporting Actor**: **Jeffrey Xu - The Takedown as Lin Jinxiong**; Chew Chor Meng - The Heartland Hero as Zhong Buzhang; James Seah - Key Witness as Dex Ang; Zhang Ze Tong - Key Witness as Nick Zhu; Zhu Houren - My Star Bride as Chung Yongnian	**Best Supporting Actress**: **Lin Meijiao - My Star Bride as Pan Xiuqin**; Bonnie Loo - Key Witness as Hannah Chua; Cynthia Koh - My Star Bride as Chung Peipei; Lina Ng - Key Witness as Ye Lina 叶; Rui En - The Heartland Hero as Qiu Jingwen
**Young Talent Award**: **Goh Wee Ann - The Heartland Hero as Zhong Li**; Alfred Ong - Key Witness as Ethan; Cana Yu - My Mini-Me and Me as Young Jiayi; Nathaniel Ng - iKid, You Not! as Xiaoquan; Zemily Leaw - The Peculiar Pawnbroker as Su Xiaomi	**Best Evergreen Artiste**: **Xiang Yun**; Chen Shucheng; Lin Meijiao; Wang Yuqing; Zhu Houren
**Best Programme Host**: **Quan Yi Fong - Hear U Out S2**; Desmond Ng - Curious City; Guo Liang - The Inner Circle; Ke Le - Curious City; Kym Ng - Old Taste Detective S2	

==== Special awards ====
**All Time Favourite Artiste**	**Zheng Geping**	2010 | 2011 | 2012 | 2013 | 2014 | 2016 | 2018 | 2019 | 2021
**All Time Favourite Artiste**	**Dennis Chew**	2011 | 2012 | 2013 | 2014 | 2016 | 2017 | 2018 | 2019 | 2021

==== Top 10 Most Popular Artiste ====
Table key
10	Winner of 10th award to be named All-Time Favourite Artiste at next ceremony

Eligible artistes were shortlisted to participate in a nationwide poll of 1,000 people representing an equal breakdown across various age groups across Singapore's demographic, called "Popularity Survey". It was conducted independently by an accredited market research company. 40 artistes were announced on 10 March 2022 and the voting period opened from 11 March 2022, 12:00pm to 24 April 2022, 8:00pm. Each user was limited to one vote per day, but the restriction was lifted to allow unlimited voting on 24 April 2022 from 12:00am to 8:00pm. The weightage of the survey-to-votes were adjusted to 30%-70%.

**Top 10 Most Popular Female Artistes 十大最受欢迎女艺人**
Artistes	Top 10
Carrie Wong	7
Chantalle Ng	1
Cynthia Koh	3
Felicia Chin	**10**
Hong Ling	2
Jesseca Liu	9
Paige Chua	7
Rebecca Lim	**10**
Ya Hui	6
Yvonne Lim	9
**Top 10 Most Popular Male Artistes 十大最受欢迎男艺人**
Artistes	Top 10
Ben Yeo	3
Brandon Wong	1
Desmond Tan	6
Guo Liang	7
Lee Teng	6
Marcus Chin	2
Pierre Png	5
Romeo Tan	7
Shaun Chen	5
Xu Bin	4

== My Pick! awards ==
Favourite Female Show Stealer	Favourite Male Show Stealer
Chantalle Ng - My Star Bride as Mai Phương Thảo; Jesseca Liu - Crouching Tiger Hidden Ghost as Lin Xiaofang; Joanne Peh - Mind Jumper as Khoo Kaile; Rui En - Mister Flower as Chen Huiling; Tasha Low - Live Your Dreams as Lee Sitong	Xu Bin - My Star Bride as Chung Shee Jie; Desmond Tan - Key Witness as Chen Zhiming; Glenn Yong - Live Your Dreams as Sun Yian; Jeremy Chan - Crouching Tiger Hidden Ghost as Ma Da; Richie Koh - Live Your Dreams as Zhu Yongjie
Most Attention Seeking New-Gen Host	Most Hated Villain
Herman Keh - Curious City; Jernelle Oh - JustSwipeLah; Juin Teh - Star Awards 2021 - Backstage Live : Artistes' Preparation; Seow Sin Nee - JustSwipeLah; Zhang Ze Tong - JustSwipeLah	Brandon Wong - Recipe of Life as Qian Nanhua; Chen Tianwen - Mister Flower as Zhu Guodong; Guo Liang - CTRL as Liang Wendao; Huang Biren - Recipe of Life as Chen Huiying; Jeffrey Xu - The Takedown as Lin Jinxiong
Perfect Combo
Chen Biyu, Dennis Chew, Marcus Chin, Mark Lee - Yujian Huangchong (Weekend Edition); Chen Liping, Kym Ng - HDB Tai Tai 4.0; Chen Ning, Zhong Kun Hua - SPOP WAVE!; Desmond Ng, Herman Keh, Ke Le - Curious City; Guo Liang, Quan Yi Fong - Star Awards 2021
Favourite CP (Couple Pairing)
Xu Bin and Chantalle Ng - Chung Shee Jie and Mai Phương Thảo (My Star Bride）; Elvin Ng and Rui En — Gao Yufei and Chen Huiling (Mister Flower); Glenn Yong and Chantalle Ng — Sun Yian and Fang Jingchen (Live Your Dreams); Jeremy Chan and Jesseca Liu — Ma Da and Lin Xiaofang (Crouching Tiger Hidden Ghost）; Richie Koh and Tasha Low — Zhu Yongjie and Lee Sitong (Live Your Dreams）

Multiple nominations
Nominations	Work
5	Live Your Dreams 大大的梦想
3	Crouching Tiger Hidden Ghosts 臥虎藏鬼
3	My Star Bride 过江新娘
3	Mister Flower 花花公子
3	JustSwipeLah 刷一刷
2	Recipe of Life 味之道
2	Curious City 小岛国，大发现

Multiple awards
Awards	Work
3	My Star Bride

== Sponsored awards ==
These was announced during the Walk-of-fame.

Bioskin Most Charismatic Artiste Award
Bioskin 魅力四射奖
- Desmond Tan
  - Chantalle Ng
  - He Ying Ying
  - James Seah
  - Zhang Ze Tong

== Nominations statistics ==
Nominations	Name of the Drama Series	Awards	Nominated Category
7	My Star Bride《过江新娘》	3	Best Drama Serial 最佳戏剧, Best Actor 最佳男主角, Best Actress 最佳女主角, Best Supporting Actor 最佳男配角, Best Supporting Actress 最佳女配角 (2 Noms) (1 win), Best Theme Song 最佳主题曲
7	Key Witness《关键证人》	—N/a	Best Actor 最佳男主角，Best Supporting Actor 最佳男配角 (2 Noms), Best Supporting Actress 最佳女配角 (2 Noms), Young Talent Award 青苹果奖, Best Theme Song 最佳主题曲
4	Crouching Tiger Hidden Ghost 《臥虎藏鬼》	—N/a	Best Drama Serial 最佳戏剧, Best Actor 最佳男主角, Best Actress 最佳女主角, Best Theme Song 最佳主题曲
3	The Heartland Hero 《邻里帮》	1	Best Supporting Actor 最佳男配角, Best Supporting Actress 最佳女配角, Young Talent award 青苹果奖
2	CTRL《操控》	—N/a	Best Actress 最佳女主角, Best Theme Song 最佳主题曲
2	Recipe Of Life《味之道》	2	Best Actor 最佳男主角, Best Actress 最佳女主角
2	Soul Old Yet so Young《心里住着老灵魂》	—N/a	Best Drama Serial 最佳戏剧, Best Actor 最佳男主角
2	The Takedown《肃战肃绝》	1	Best Drama Serial 最佳戏剧, Best Supporting Actor 最佳男配角
2	Mind Jumper《触心罪探》	—N/a	Best Drama Serial 最佳戏剧, Best Actress 最佳女主角
2	iKid, You Not!《返老还童》	—N/a	Young Talent Award 青苹果奖, Best Short-Form Drama Series 最佳短篇戏剧

Nominations	Name of the Programmes	Awards	Nominated Category
3	Curious City《小岛国，大发现》	—N/a	Best Entertainment Programme 最佳综艺节目，Best Programme Host 最佳综艺及资讯节目主持人 (2 Noms)
3	Star Awards 2021《红星大奖2021》	1	Best Entertainment Special 最佳综艺特备节目 (3 Noms) (1 win)
2	Hear U Out S2《权听你说 2》	1	Best Entertainment Programme 最佳综艺节目，Best Programme Host 最佳综艺及资讯节目主持人
2	The Inner Circle《神秘嘉宾》	1	Best Entertainment Programme 最佳综艺节目，Best Programme Host 最佳综艺及资讯节目主持人

== Presenters and performers ==
The following individuals presented awards and performed musical numbers.

Presenters
Name(s)	Role
Nathaniel Ng 黄企健; Marcus Chin	Young Talent Award 青苹果奖; Best Evergreen Artiste 常青演绎奖
Adrian Ang 小明; Jaspers Lai	Best Short-form Drama 最佳短篇戏剧; Best Short-form Programme 最佳短篇综艺节目
Pets Tseng; Austin Lin	Best Supporting Actor 最佳男配角; Best Supporting Actress 最佳女配角
Jacky Wu	Best Infotainment Programme 最佳资讯节目; Best Entertainment Programme 最佳综艺节目
Irene Ang; Cavin Soh; Guo Liang	Best Radio Programme 最佳电台节目
Marcus Chin; Mark Lee; Dennis Chew	Best Theme Song 最佳主题曲
Josephine Teo; Minister for Communications and Information	All time Favorite Award 超级红星
Carol Cheng	Best Variety Special 最佳特备节目
Moses Chan	Best Drama Serial 最佳戏剧
—N/a	Best Programme Host 最佳综艺及资讯节目主持人
Mickey Huang	Top 10 Most Popular Artistes 十大最受欢迎男女艺人
Mark Lee	Introduced Presenter Aaron Kwok 郭富城
Aaron Kwok	Best Actor 最佳男主角; Best Actress 最佳女主角

Performers
Name	Work
Alfred Sim	"反话" from CTRL
Jocie Guo	"温习" from My Star Bride
Chantalle Ng; Tasha Low; Ferlyn Wong; Abigail; Latonia Tay	"是谁" from Live Your Dreams 大大的梦想
Jeremy Chan	"乱掉" from Crouching Tiger Hidden Ghost
AL4HA	"你的呼唤" from Key Witness 关键证人

== Ceremony information ==
The ceremony's theme, "When the Stars Align, Dreams Come True" (星光荟聚, 筑梦视界), paid tribute to the challenges caused by the COVID-19 pandemic in Singapore while delivering celebrations with an award show to honour Singapore's content and artistes.

Each program is eligible for a Star Awards only once throughout the show's lifetime, meaning that if any program was nominated for this ceremony, they will be ineligible for the 2023 awards.

For the sixth consecutive year, Bioskin was the main presenter at the Star Awards Ceremony and sponsored the Bioskin Most Charismatic Artist Award. Online voting began on 25 March 2022 and ended on 10 April 2022. The winner for the award was announced during the Red Carpet Show.

The My Pick! Awards were introduced in the ceremony and held during the Backstage Live segment. Award categories include Favourite CP, The Male Show Stealer, The Female Show Stealer, Most Hated Villain, Perfect Combo and Most Attention-Seeking New Gen Host.

The nominees for the performance categories were announced on 16 February 2022 while the popularity categories were announced on 10 March.

The ceremony featured a robot attendant which delivered awards to the recipients during the ceremony. Several guest presenters who were not present at the show - Mickey Huang, Aaron Kwok, and Jacky Wu - appeared via holograms to present the awards.
