= Pornsak Prajakwit =

Singapore television personality

Pornsak
- Born: Pornsak Prajakwit (Thai: พรศักดิ์ ประจักษ์วิทย์); 14 January 1982 (age 44); Sathon District, Bangkok, Thailand
- Education: Singapore Management University; Guangzhou University of Chinese Medicine
- Occupations: Host; businessman; radio deejay
- Years active: 2004–present
- Agent: Left Profile
- Awards: Full list

Pornsak Prajakwit (born in Thailand on 14 January 1982), better known mononymously as Pornsak, is a Singapore-based TCM doctor, TV host and businessman.

Pornsak has won multiple awards at the Star Awards, Singapore's most prestigious entertainment award ceremony, including Best Variety Show Host in 2015 and Top 10 Most Popular Male Artiste Award ten times. From 2015 to 2017, he was also voted Reader’s Digest Most Trusted Entertainer in Asia, as part of the Reader’s Digest Trusted Brand Survey.

Pornsak is an academic over-achiever. He holds 4 degress:

• A Bachelor of Business Management (Finance and Accounting) from Singapore Management University

• A Master’s Degree in Education from Monash University

• A Bachelor’s Degree in Traditional Chinese Medicine (TCM) from Guangzhou University

• A Master of Science in Nutrition and Lifestyle Medicine from the NUS Yong Loo Lin School of Medicine

Despite cutting his full-time ties with the TV stations in 2011 to pursue medicine and digital sales, his legendary status on local television remains completely undisputed, culminating in him being awarded the prestigious All-Time Favourite Artiste title at the Star Awads 2025.

== Early life and education ==
Pornsak was born in 1982 in Sathon District, Bangkok, Thailand, to a mainland Chinese father and a Thai-Chinese mother. Pornsak's mother died when he was five years old. Shortly afterwards, his father sent him to Singapore where he studied at Northlight School, Clementi Town Secondary School and Jurong Junior College. During his early years, he reportedly suffered from a language impediment. In 2004, Pornsak graduated with Bachelor of Business Management from Singapore Management University. Pornsak attended Monash University, where he read for a master's degree in Early Childhood Education. In June 2015, he obtained his bachelor's degree in Traditional Chinese Medicine (TCM) from Guangzhou University of Chinese Medicine.

== Career ==
Pornsak won a competition run by Singapore Press Holdings radio station UFM 1003 and joined them as a full-time radio deejay. He started as a television host at Mediacorp in 2007.

Pornsak has hosted many different genres of shows. In 2007, he won the title of Best Newcomer at the Star Awards. He subsequently was voted to the "Top 10 Most Popular Artiste" and won the "Coolest Rocket Award". Pornsak co-owns a Thai restaurant, Porn's Sexy Thai Food and founded an education lab for young children. In December 2016, his restaurant had been taken over by Jus Delish Group with the stake of 69%.

In 2017, he was invited by CCTV, China's national broadcaster, to make a special appearance in their international debate competition programme.

Pornsak won ten Top 10 Most Popular Male Artistes from 2009, 2011, 2013–2015, 2017–2021 and 2024 respectively and was awarded All-Time Favourite Artiste in 2025 for the achievement.

Pornsak left Mediacorp on 31 January 2011, and joined Michelle Chong's artiste management agency, Left Profile.

== Awards and nominations ==
Ceremony	Year	Category	Nominated work	Result	Ref
Asian Academy Creative Awards	2021	Best Lifestyle, Entertainment Presenter/Host	Neighborhood Fixer	Nominated	
Star Awards	2007	Best Newcomer	—N/a	Won	
Star Awards	2009	Top 10 Most Popular Male Artistes	—N/a	Won	
Star Awards	2010	Best Info-Ed Programme Host	Stars for a Cause	Nominated	
Star Awards	2010	Top 10 Most Popular Male Artistes	—N/a	Nominated	
Star Awards	2011	Best Variety Show Host	Food Source	Nominated	
Star Awards	2011	Rocket	Food Source	Won	
Star Awards	2011	Top 10 Most Popular Male Artistes	—N/a	Won	
Star Awards	2012	Best Variety Show Host	Food Source	Nominated	
Star Awards	2012	Top 10 Most Popular Male Artistes	—N/a	Nominated	
Star Awards	2013	Best Variety Show Host	Food Source	Nominated	
Star Awards	2013	Top 10 Most Popular Male Artistes	—N/a	Won	
Star Awards	2014	Best Variety Show Host	The Joy Truck	Nominated	
Star Awards	2014	Top 10 Most Popular Male Artistes	—N/a	Won	
Star Awards	2015	Best Variety Show Host	The Joy Truck 2	Won	
Star Awards	2015	Best Info-Ed Programme Host	Shop Stories	Nominated	
Star Awards	2015	Most Popular Regional Artiste (China)	—N/a	Nominated	
Star Awards	2015	Most Popular Regional Artiste (Indonesia)	—N/a	Nominated	
Star Awards	2015	Top 10 Most Popular Male Artistes	—N/a	Won	
Star Awards	2016	Best Programme Host	Ge Tai Challenge	Nominated	
Star Awards	2016	Top 10 Most Popular Male Artistes	—N/a	Nominated	
Star Awards	2017	Top 10 Most Popular Male Artistes	—N/a	Won	
Star Awards	2018	Top 10 Most Popular Male Artistes	—N/a	Won	
Star Awards	2019	Top 10 Most Popular Male Artistes	—N/a	Won	
Star Awards	2021	Top 10 Most Popular Male Artistes	—N/a	Won	
Star Awards	2022	Top 10 Most Popular Male Artistes	—N/a	Nominated	
Star Awards	2024	Top 10 Most Popular Male Artistes	—N/a	Won	
Star Awards	2025	All-Time Favourite Artiste	—N/a	Won	
