= Kym Ng =

Singaporean host and actress (born 1967)

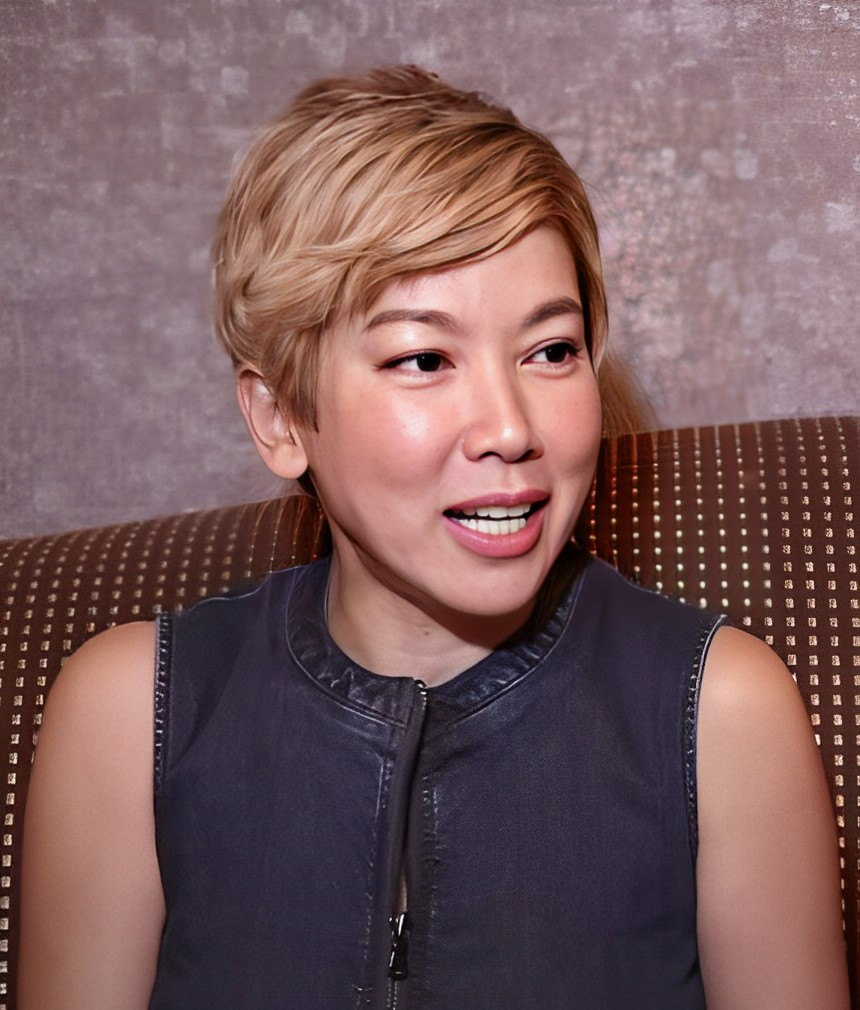
- Ng in May 2017
- Born: Ng Kwee Kim; 1 July 1967 (age 59); Singapore
- Education: River Valley High School; Tanjong Katong Secondary School
- Occupations: Host; actress; former singer; former flight attendant
- Years active: 1993–present
- Agents: SPH MediaWorks; Mediacorp; The Celebrity Agency
- Spouse: Yang Guo (m. 2009)
- Awards: Full list
- Musical career
- Genre: Mandopop
- Instrument: Vocals

Stage name
- Traditional Chinese: 鐘琴
- Simplified Chinese: 钟琴
- Hanyu Pinyin: Zhōng Qín

Birth name
- Traditional Chinese: 黃桂琴
- Simplified Chinese: 黄桂琴
- Hanyu Pinyin: Huáng Guìqín

Kym Ng Kwee Kim (born 1 July 1967) is a Singaporean television host and actress. She is known as one of Mediacorp's Variety Ah Jies (综艺阿姐).

Ng has received numerous accolades locally and regionally.

At the Star Awards, she was recognised with 4 record-breaking Best Variety Show Host wins in 1998, 1999, 2011 and 2013, two Best Supporting Actress wins in 2018 and 2021, and a Best Actress win in 2024. Her win in 1998 made her the first recipient in the former category.

Regionally, Ng was also awarded two Asian Television Awards in 2003 and 2005 and an Asia Rainbow TV Award in 2019.

== Education ==
Ng was educated at River Valley High School and did pre-university studies (A Levels) at Tanjong Katong Secondary School.

== Career ==
Ng was previously a flight stewardess with Singapore Airlines. She began her show business career as a singer, releasing albums under the recording company, Hype Records. Subsequently, she joined the MediaCorp's predecessor Television Corporation of Singapore in 1995. Ng's debut acting role was as a courtesan in Strange Encounters III, replacing Margaret Lee as she was injured in a fall and could not act. Ng started her hosting career in a similar way as a temporary replacement for one of City Beat's host, He Yongfang.

Ng became known to audiences as host of the popular infotainment programme City Beat alongside Pan Lingling, Lina Ng, Sharon Au and Bryan Wong. Her performance in the programme earned Ng her first two wins in the coveted Best Variety Show Host award at the Star Awards. In 2001, she left MediaCorp and joined SPH MediaWorks.

In 2004, Ng acted in her first English drama, Durian King, a local sitcom produced by Channel i, alongside Adrian Pang. She would win the award Best Comedy Performance by an Actress in the 2005 Asian Television Awards even though Channel i ceased to exist by then.

In 2005, SPH MediaWorks merged with MediaCorp and Ng was transferred back to MediaCorp.

Although bilingual, Ng is most often seen on Chinese language programmes on Channel 8 and Channel U. She is known for her direct connection with the audience and her bubbly nature. She often hosts "food reviews" and variety shows. Since returning to MediaCorp, Ng has enjoyed success and has hosted more than 150 shows since the start of her television career.

In 2005, Ng was approached by director Wee Li Lin to star in the film, Gone Shopping. Her performance was stated by the Straits Times as "(Kym) Ng is a revelation here. Her role Clara, who could have been a self-indulgent bore of a character, is beguilingly shy, naively yearning and sweetly forlorn." The film took two years to complete (June 2005 to July 2007). Ng was quoted on U-weekly magazine that she was mentally prepared that the film would not follow through. The principal shoot of the film commenced in December 2006 to March 2007.

Ng also hosted The Sheng Siong Show when it started in 2007.

In 2011, Ng hosted the highly acclaimed variety show Love on a Plate. The programme won Best Variety Programme and gotten Ng her third Best Variety Show Host win at the Star Awards 2011. It also won a "highly commended" recognition for Best Reality Programme at the 2011 Asian Television Awards. Her performance in Jobs Around the World bagged Ng her fourth Best Variety Show Host win, tying her with Sharon Au and Mark Lee for the record of most wins in the category.

For acting, her role as the repressed Luo Na in It Takes Two secured Ng her first Best Actress nomination at the Star Awards in 2013. It was her second acting performance award nomination, following her Best Supporting Actress nomination for her role as Hai De in The New Adventures of Wisely in 1998. At Star Awards 2018, her supporting role as Lu Meiguang in When Duty Calls garnered Ng her first acting performance award win at the award show. The win marks Ng's second acting performance award of her career, after being recognised at the 2005 Asian Television Awards for Best Comedy Performance by an Actress for her role in Durian King.

In Star Awards 2019, Ng received the All-Time Favourite Artiste after winning the Top 10 Most Popular Female Artistes award from 1998-1999, 2006–2007, 2012–2013 and 2015–2018. Currently, she is the co-host of The Sheng Siong Show, together with Dasmond Koh and Seow Sin Nee.

In 2024, Ng received her first Star Award for Best Actress for her role as Yang Kehua in Till the End, a romantic comedy drama revolving the lives of undertakers and the subject of death and separation.

== Personal life ==
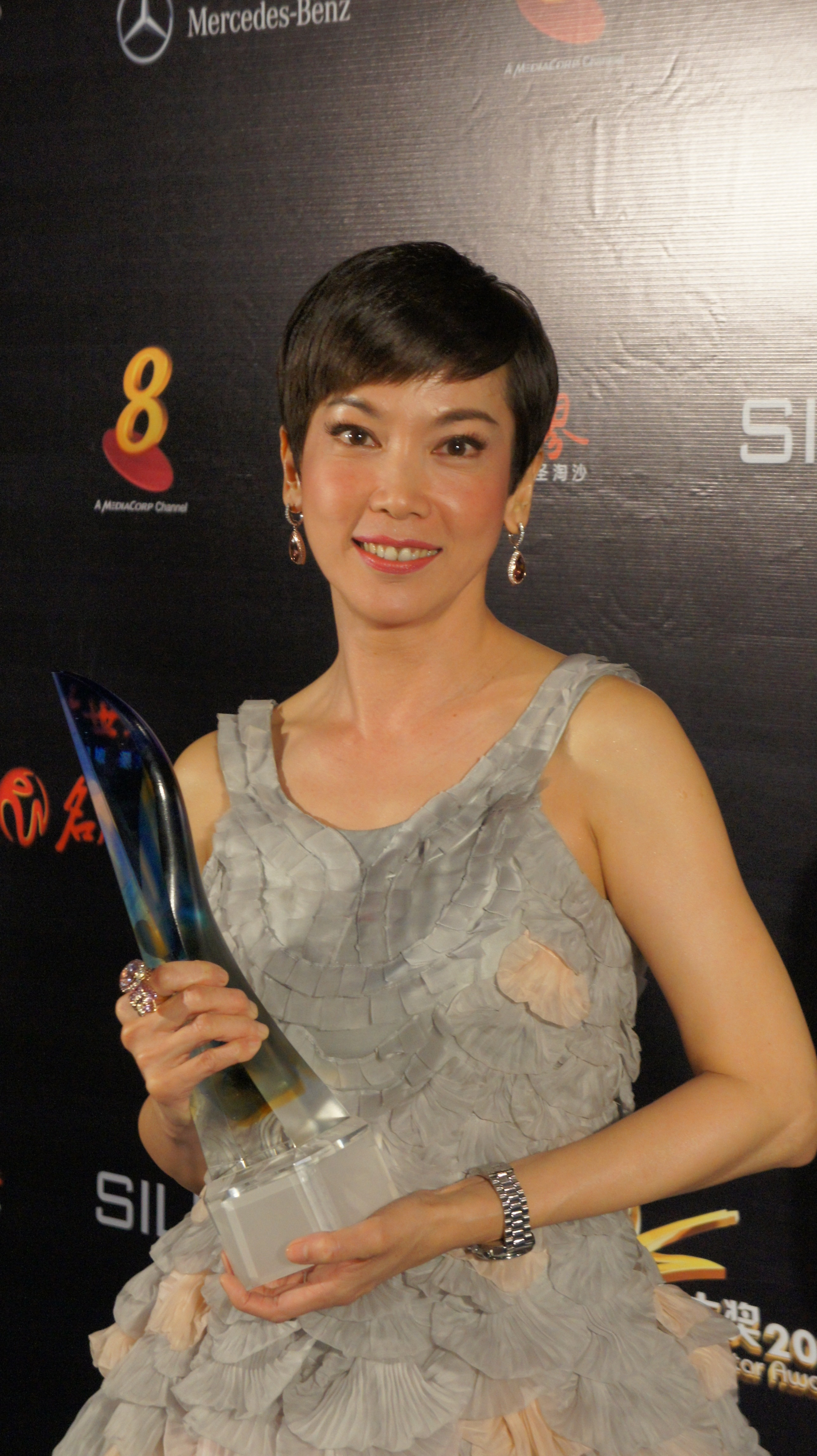
Ng at the Star Awards 2011

Ng comes from a working-class family of four children. In 2009, Ng married her long-time boyfriend at a simple ceremony overseas. She is known for zealously safeguarding her privacy and rarely discloses her private life or personal details to the media. Ng also disclosed that she does not intend to have children because caring for a child in the long run is too much of a hassle.

Ng suffered from hyperthyroidism since 2000.

In 2023, Ng had a fall and broke her wrist while filming the supernatural series Till the End. She was given five weeks of medical leave and rest, while Malaysian actress Denise Camillia Tan stepped in as co-host for The Sheng Siong Show alongside Dasmond Koh during her absence.

== Filmography ==
=== Variety and infotainment show ===
Year	Title	Role	Notes	Ref
1991−2000	City Beat 城人杂志			
1991−2000	欢乐大放送			
1991−2000	超级幸运夜			
1991−2000	Comedy Nite 搞笑行动			
1991−2000	PSC Nite 普威之夜			
1991−2000	一见钟情			
2001-2	S.N.A.P.			
2000 – 2001	Happy Rules 开心就好			
2000 – 2001	Live Unlimited 综艺无界限			
2002	Snap Special – Channel U's 2nd Year Anniversary			
2002	Celebrity Travellers 自由万岁			
2002	Mission Possible 地球无界线			

- 2003
  - Add Your Service 服务加加加
  - Snap Special – Romance Of The Book and Sword 全星总动员 – 书剑总动员版
  - Everybody's Talking – (Translator of Teochew for SARS prevention programme) 人人有话说 – 担任潮州翻译
  - Beyond the Camourflage 与军共武
  - Top Ten 十不相瞒
  - Food Train 食在必行
  - Bon Voyage 一路风光
- 2004
  - Ren Ci Charity Show 2004 仁心慈爱照万千2004 (Stunt: Walking across 45-storey high makeshift bridge from Suntec Tower 1 to Tower 2)
  - SNAP 3 全星总动员3
  - Ultimate Tastebud 食在好吃
  - Mama Mia All Star Potluck 食星报喜
  - Food Train 2 食在必行2
  - The Next Big Thing 全民偶像新登场
- 2005
  - Ren Ci Charity Show 2005 仁心慈爱照万千2005 (Duo skit/stunt (With Mark Lee): Do household chores hanging upside down)
  - Lunar New Year Special – Year of Rooster 天鸡报喜贺新春
  - Chingay Parade of Dreams 2005 装艺大游行之奇思梦想
  - Love Bites 缘来就是你
  - The NKF Cancer Show 1 群星照亮千万心之风雨同舟献真心 (Duo performance (With Bryan Wong): Paper Art – Impersonation/costume changing skit)
  - The NKF Cancer Show 2 群星照亮千万心之 (Stunt performance: Rescue mission & Stacking up)
  - Perfect 10 十分十全十美
  - Pretty Woman 想得美
  - National Day Parade 2005 国庆庆典2005
  - Get It Right 正是如此
  - Oral B Smile Oral B 笑一笑, 比一比
  - Love Bites 2 缘来就是你 2
  - Small Kids, Big Wits 谁敢小看我
  - Star Idol 明星偶像
  - Superhost (评审) 超级主持人 (Judge)
  - Affairs Of The Heart 2005 心手相连2005 (Duo performance (With Quan Yi Fong): Fluorescent stunt
- 2006
  - Ren Ci Charity Show 2006 仁心慈爱照万千2006 (Stunt performance: The Mermaid)
  - Lunar New Year Special – Year of Dog
  - Pretty Woman 2 想·得·美2
  - Never Say Die 永不言败
  - Vesak Day Special 卫塞节特备节目 (Er-hu performance: 呼唤 (大长今主题曲))
  - Its Showtime! 全民创意争霸赛
  - Hey Hey Taxi 比比接车无比乐
  - My Star Guide – Spain 我的导游是明星 – 西班牙
  - HDB Tai Tai HDB 太太
  - Giant Stars 2006 Giant 星光灿烂 2006
  - Love at Marina Square (6 One-minute episode drama)
  - Ultimate Comedian (Guest Judge) 爆笑新人王 (嘉宾评审)
  - Who's Naughty and Nice 黑白讲
  - Fact or Fiction? 真相大点击
- 2007
  - Ren Ci Charity Show 2007 仁心慈爱照万千2007 (Piano performance: Ebony & Ivory)
  - Lunar New Year Special – Year of Pig 金猪贺岁庆肥年 2007 (@ Studio)
  - HDB Tai Tai 2 HDB太太2
  - Never Too Old 新领屋
  - Get It Right 2 正是如此2
  - Makeover Pte Ltd 请你来变装
  - Code Red 爱上小红点
  - Sheng Siong Show 缤纷万千在昇松
  - Hey Gorgeous (Guest host) 校花校草追赶跑 (嘉宾主持)
  - The Cancer Charity Show 2007 癌过有晴天 2007 (歌舞表演: 满场飞, 情花开, 说不出的快活)
  - The President's Star Charity 2007 (Group Song & Dance performance: Kal Ho Naa Ho)
  - Star Awards 2007 Prelude 星光隧道 2007
  - Bioskin Dreams Come True Bioskin 要你好看
  - Wow Singapore 全新体验
  - Sheng Siong Show 2 缤纷万千在昇松 2
- 2008
  - Lunar New Year Special – Year of Rat 八方祥瑞鼠来宝 (@ Studio, Host/Skit performance)
  - Buzzing Cashier 抢摊大行动
  - U Are The One 唯我独尊
  - The SiChuan Earthquake Charity Show 让爱川流不息 (Group song performance: 感恩的心)
  - President's Star Charity 2008 (Solo song performance: 说不出的快活)
  - Her Sense 女人香
  - My Star Guide 3 – Japan 我的导游是明星3 – 日本
  - The Sheng Siong Show III 缤纷万千在昇菘III
  - Food Hometown – Teochew 美食寻根 – 潮州
  - Love Matters (Guest Host)
  - 3 Plus 1 Series 三菜一汤 (as Guest, VS Michelle Chia)
  - Celeb's A Cook 名厨大冻作 (as Guest, Ep 6)
  - Supreme Matron 超级好管家
  - Super Tots 我是俏宝宝
  - The Sheng Siong Show IV 缤纷万千在昇菘IV
  - Channel 8 Countdown Party 2009 八频道跨年派对
- 2009
  - Lunar New Year's Eve Special – Year of Ox 牛转乾坤喜临门 (@ Studio)
  - The Sheng Siong Show V 缤纷万千在昇菘V
  - Buzzing Cashier 2 抢摊大行动 2
  - Easy Cooking 七步成食
  - New City Beat 城人新杂志
  - SPD Charity Show 真情无障爱 (Duo performance: Er Hu (with Zoe Tay – Dance)
  - True Hearts 2009 公益献爱心 (Guest Host 嘉宾主持)
  - The Sheng Siong Show VI 缤纷万千在昇菘VI
  - Fashion Asia 亚洲时尚风 – Bangkok 曼谷
  - CelebriTea Break 2 (Guo Liang's special guest) (艺点心思 2) (郭亮 – 好友嘉宾)
  - Channel 8 Countdown Party 2010 at VivoCity 八频道跨年派对 2010
  - SMRT Challenge 2009 SMRT大挑战 2009
- 2010
  - Lunar New Year's Eve Special – Year of Tiger 普天同庆金虎年 (@ Chinatown, Guest performance: 小妹去拜年)
  - Ren Ci Charity Show 2010 仁心慈爱照万千2010
  - Black Rose 爆料黑玫瑰
  - Star Awards 2010 Show 1 红星大奖2010 第一场 (18 April 2010)
  - The Sheng Siong Show VII 缤纷万千在昇菘 VII
  - New City Beat 2 城人新杂志 2
  - Don't Forget The Lyrics (Chinese celebrities special) 我要唱下去 (艺人版 Celebrities series) (Guest appearance)
  - Love on a Plate 名厨出走记 (Variety Blockbuster)
  - Buffetlicious (Guest Host)
  - Loving Touch 关怀方式 (Guest Host)
  - 同济医院慈善夜 Thong Chai Charity Show
  - Singapore Hit Awards 2010 第15届新加坡金曲奖 (Guest award presenter)
  - Gatekeepers 小兵迎大将 (Guest appearance)
  - The Sheng Siong Show VIII 缤纷万千在昇菘VIII
  - Dream Potter 梦。窑匠 (Guest Host)
  - Home Makeover 玩家万岁
- 2011
  - Lunar New Year's Eve Special – Year of Rabbit 金兔呈祥喜迎春 (@ Chinatown)
  - Chef Apprentice 名厨实习生
  - Power Duet K歌2击队 (Duet performance with Dasmond Koh: 美丽的神话, won in Celebrities' episode)
  - Star Awards 2011 Show 1 红星大奖2011 第一场
  - Buffetlicious 2 永远吃不肥2 (Guest Host)
  - HDB Tai Tai 3 HDB太太3
  - The Sheng Siong Show 9 缤纷万千在昇菘 9
  - The Sheng Siong Show 10 缤纷万千在昇菘 10
  - My Star Guide 4 – Sri Lanka 我的导游是明星4 – 斯里兰卡
  - The Silver Tribute Charity Night 2011 万千金辉照乐年 2011 (Group performance: African drum)
  - President's Star Charity 2011 (Group performance: Ballroom dancing)
  - 3 Plus 1 Series 3 三菜一汤3 (as Guest, partner with Guo Liang VS Taiwan celebrities 宋达民 & 黄腾浩)
  - Sizzlng Woks 3 煮炒来咯！3
  - Show Me The Money 钱哪里有问题
  - Foodie Dash 食品大赢家 (Guest appearance)
  - SMRT Challenge 2011 SMRT大挑战 2011
  - Channel 8 Countdown Party 2012 8频道跨年派对2012 (Guest performance)
- 2012
  - Lunar New Year's Eve Special – Year of Dragon 金龙腾飞庆丰年 (@ Studio)
  - Thye Hua Kwan Charity Show 2012 (Performing group – Belly Dance) 太和观一心一德为善乐 2012 (表演: 肚皮舞)
  - Just Noodles 面对面
  - Knock Knock Who's There (Guest Judge, Ep 10 & 13) 啊! 是你到我家 (嘉宾评审, 第10 & 13集)
  - Melting Pot (Guest) 新新料理 (嘉宾)
  - The Sheng Siong Show 11 缤纷万千在昇菘 11
  - The Sheng Siong Show 12 缤纷万千在昇菘 12
  - Battle @ Water Margin 我爱水浒传
  - Jobs around the world 走遍天涯打工乐
  - S.N.A.P 熠熠星光总动员
  - MediaCorp 30th Anniversary Drama Show 戏剧情牵30年
  - Channel 8 Countdown Party 2013 8频道跨年派对2013
- 2013
  - Lunar New Year's Eve Special – Year of Snake 灵蛇贺新春 (@ Studio)
  - Makan Places Lost N Found (Guest)
  - Ladies' Nite 2 女人俱乐部 2
  - Laughing Out Loud 笑笑没烦恼
  - The Sheng Siong Show 13 缤纷万千在昇菘 13
  - Body SOS 2（Guest: Episode 9 & 10 [Insomnia]) 小毛病，大问题 2 (嘉宾: 第9 & 10集 [失眠])
  - The Joy Truck（Guest: Episode 2) 快乐速递 (嘉宾: 第2集)
  - Stir It Up 电视拌饭
  - Finding U 寻U先锋
  - My Grand Partner! 大小拍档
  - President's Star Charity 2013 (Group performance: Dance)
  - My Star Guide 9 – Sydney/Melbourne 我的导游是明星9 – 悉尼/墨尔本
  - The Sheng Siong Show 14 缤纷万千在昇菘 14
  - Volkswagen Holiday On Wheels (Guest: Episode 2 & 3) 陪你兜兜风 (嘉宾: 第2 & 3集)
  - Counter Fake (Guest) 识货衙门 (嘉宾)
  - Where The Queue Starts 4 (Guest) 排排站，查查看 4 (嘉宾)
  - I Weekly Show (Guest: Episode 3 & 4) i不释手 (嘉宾: 第3 & 4集)
  - Singapore Hit Awards 2013 第18届新加坡金曲奖 (Guest award presenter)
  - Countdown TV 50 电视欢庆50周年
- 2014
  - Lunar New Year's Eve Special – Year of Horse 俊马奔腾喜迎春 (@ Studio)
  - The Sheng Siong Show 15 缤纷万千在昇菘 15
  - 3 Plus 1 Series 4 三菜一汤4 (as Guest in Episode 5)
  - Le Petit Chef 我的师傅是大厨 (嘉宾: 第9集)
  - Back To School 超龄插班生 (嘉宾: 第1集)
  - Neighbourhood Chef 邻里厨王
  - Cheap and Good 便宜有好货
  - Black Rose 2 爆料黑玫瑰 2
  - The Sheng Siong Show 16 缤纷万千在昇菘 16
  - Finding 8 先锋争8战
- 2015
  - The Sheng Siong Show 17 缤纷万千在昇菘 17
  - The Sheng Siong Show 18 缤纷万千在昇菘 18
  - My Star Guide 10 – Japan 我的导游是明星10 – 日本
  - The Games We Played 那些年，我们一起玩的游戏 (Guest: Episode 1 & 4)
  - The 5 Show as Ibu Tjio (Outdoor segment with Irene Ang)
  - Body SOS 3 小毛病 大问题 3 (Guest)
  - Ladies Nite 3 女人俱乐部 3 (Guest: Episode 5 – 12)
  - What Your School Doesn't Teach You 学校没教的事 (Guest: Episode 9)
- 2016
  - Life Hacks 没那么简单
  - Touch Screen Cuisine 弹指间的料理 (Guest: Episode 3)
  - Hearts and Hugs 爱心72小时 (Guest Artiste: Episode 2 – Activity: Running)
  - The Sheng Siong Show 19 缤纷万千在昇菘 19
  - Just Cook It 一起来下厨
  - The Sheng Siong Show 20 缤纷万千在昇菘 20
- 2017
  - Happy Can Already! 欢喜就好 (Guest: Episode 8)
  - The Sheng Siong Show 21 缤纷万千在昇菘 21
  - Ah Ma Can Cook 阿妈来做饭
  - What's in the fridge 2 冰箱的秘密2 (Guest: Episode 4)
  - The Sheng Siong Show 21 缤纷万千在昇菘 22
  - Buzzing Hawkers
- 2018
  - Lunar New Year's Eve Special – Year of Dog 阿狗狗旺旺过好年 (@ Chinatown)
- 2019
  - The Destined One
- 2019-2022: The Sheng Siong Show 缤纷万千在昇菘 (6 seasons)
- 2023: The Sheng Siong Show (First season) 缤纷万千在昇菘 (First 3 episodes)
- 2024: The Sheng Siong Show S35-36 缤纷万千在昇菘 S35-36
- 2025: The Sheng Siong Show S37 缤纷万千在昇菘 S37

=== Film ===
Year	Title	Role	Notes	Ref
1999	Liang Po Po: The Movie		Guest appearance	
2008	Gone Shopping	Clara Wong		
2011	It's a Great, Great World	Molly		
2012	Dance Dance Dragon	Long Ah Bee		
2013	Love...and Other Bad Habits	Suzy		
2014	Filial Party	Li Chunjiao		
2014	Wayang Boy (戏曲小子)			

=== Television series ===
Year	Title	Role	Notes	Ref
1995	Strange Encounters III 奇缘3之注生娘娘	Zhang Xianzhi		
1998	The New Adventures of Wisely	Hai De		
1998	Different Cuts, Different Strokes 剪剪大家乐	Lin Feng		
2001	Apple Pie 苹果派	Zhong Xiaodi		
2001	Happy Family 原氏一家人	Yuan Xiaomei		
2002	She Drives Me Crazy 爱上女车长	Zhong Yaqin		
2002	Westside Story 西街少年	You Lanlan		
2003	The Book and the Sword 书剑恩仇录	Zhou Qi		
2004	Jin Mao Xiang	Wang Qiang		
2004	Zero	Zhong Yaqin		
2004	Durian King			
2006	The Yang Sisters	Rose Yang		
2006	First Mums	Chiu Su-Lin		
2008	Folks Jump Over the Wall 飞越佛跳墙	Miss Lim		
2008	The Yang Sisters II	Rose Yang		
2009	Reunion Dinner	Banana		
2009	Table of Glory	Mai Tiantian		
2012	It Takes Two	Luo Na		
2015	Good Luck	Li Suxian		
2015	A Blessed Life 吉人天相	Jenny Wang Zhenni		
2016	House of Fortune	Qian Meiling		
2016	I Want to Be a Star	Hong Baobao		
2016	Eat Already?	Dr. Tay		
2016	Hero	Fishball Girl		
2017	The Lead	Liu Xinyu		
2017	When Duty Calls	Lu Meiguang		
2018	Reach for the Skies	Hong Dacai		
2019	How Are You?	Mrs Zhao		
2019	The Play Book 爱本	Ms Tan		
2019	Dear Neighbours 我的左邻右里	Lin Shujuan		
2019	My One In A Million 我的万里挑一	Zhong Qing		
2019	Day Break 天空渐渐亮	Zhang Tianqing		
2020	My Guardian Angels	Wu MiaoMiao		
2021	The Heartland Hero	Jin Xiuhui		
2022	When Duty Calls 2 卫国先锋2	Lu Meiguang		
2023	Whatever Will Be, Will Be	Zhen Huiyao	Dialect series	
2023	Till the End	Yang Kehua		

== Discography ==
=== Studio albums ===
Year	Title	Ref
1992	My Heart Is All Yours 真心属于你	
1993	小女人的独白	
1999	追钟琴感	

=== Compilation albums ===
Year	English title	Mandarin title
2013	MediaCorp Music Lunar New Year Album 13	新传媒群星金蛇献祥和
2015	MediaCorp Music Lunar New Year Album 15	新传媒群星金羊添吉祥
2016	MediaCorp Music Lunar New Year Album 16	新传媒群星金猴添喜庆
2017	MediaCorp Music Lunar New Year Album 17	新传媒群星咕鸡咕鸡庆丰年
2018	MediaCorp Music Lunar New Year Album 18	新传媒群星阿狗狗过好年
2020	MediaCorp Music Lunar New Year Album 20	裕鼠鼠纳福迎春了
2021	MediaCorp Music Lunar New Year Album 21	福满牛年Moo Moo乐

== Awards and nominations ==
Throughout her hosting and acting career, Ng has received various awards and accolades.

At the Star Awards, Ng has received 21 performance nominations, winning seven; four Best Variety Show Host Awards, two Best Supporting Actress Awards and a Best Actress Award. She was the first recipient and one of the three record holders for the most wins in the former category. At the 25th Awards Ceremony, Ng received the All-Time Favourite Artiste in recognition of winning ten Top 10 Most Popular Female Artistes awards. She was the eleventh female artiste (and twenty-first overall) to receive the accolade.

Regionally, Ng received two Asian Television Awards; Best Entertainment Presenter for Top Ten in 2003 and Best Comedy Performance by an Actress for Durian King in 2005 and Outstanding Host Award at the Asian Rainbow TV Awards in 2019 for Ah Ma Can Cook.

Year	Organisation	Category	Work	Result	Ref
1998	Star Awards	Best Supporting Actress	The New Adventures of Wisely (as Hai De)	Nominated	
1998	Star Awards	Best Presenter	City Beat	Won	
1998	Star Awards	Top 10 Most Popular Female Artistes	—N/a	Won	
1999	Star Awards	Best Variety Show Host	City Beat	Won	
1999	Star Awards	Best Comedy Performer	Different Cuts, Different Strokes	Nominated	
1999	Star Awards	Top 10 Most Popular Female Artistes	—N/a	Won	
2002	Asian Television Awards	Best Entertainment Presenter	Snap	Nominated	
2003	Asian Television Awards	Best Entertainment Presenter	Top Ten	Won	
2004	Asian Television Awards	Best Entertainment Presenter	Snap 3	Nominated	
2005	Asian Television Awards	Best Comedy Performance by an Actress	Durian King	Won	
2005	Star Awards	Best Variety Show Host	Love Bites	Nominated	
2005	Star Awards	Top 10 Most Popular Female Artistes	—N/a	Nominated	
2006	Star Awards	Best Variety Show Host	Love Bites 2	Nominated	
2006	Star Awards	Top 10 Most Popular Female Artistes	—N/a	Won	
2007	Star Awards	Top 10 Most Popular Female Artistes	—N/a	Won	
2009	Star Awards	Best Variety Show Host	Buzzing Cashier	Nominated	
2009	Star Awards	Top 10 Most Popular Female Artistes	—N/a	Nominated	
2010	Star Awards	Top 10 Most Popular Female Artistes	—N/a	Nominated	
2011	Star Awards	Best Variety Show Host	Love on a Plate	Won	
2011	Star Awards	Top 10 Most Popular Female Artistes	—N/a	Nominated	
2012	Star Awards	Best Variety Show Host	Chef Apprentice	Nominated	
2012	Star Awards	Top 10 Most Popular Female Artistes	—N/a	Won	
2013	Star Awards	Best Actress	It Takes Two (as Luo Na)	Nominated	
2013	Star Awards	Best Variety Show Host	Jobs Around the World	Won	
2013	Star Awards	YES 933 Best Speech	—N/a	Won	
2013	Star Awards	Top 10 Most Popular Female Artistes	—N/a	Won	
2014	Star Awards	Best Variety Show Host	Finding U	Nominated	
2014	Star Awards	BottomSlim Sexiest Legs Award	—N/a	Nominated	
2014	Star Awards	Top 10 Most Popular Female Artistes	—N/a	Nominated	
2015	Star Awards	Top 10 Most Popular Female Artistes	—N/a	Won	
2016	Star Awards	Top 10 Most Popular Female Artistes	—N/a	Won	
2017	Star Awards	Top 10 Most Popular Female Artistes	—N/a	Won	
2018	Star Awards	Best Supporting Actress	When Duty Calls (as Loke Meiguang)	Won	
2018	Star Awards	Best Programme Host	Ah Ma Can Cook	Nominated	
2018	Star Awards	Top 10 Most Popular Female Artistes	—N/a	Won	
2019	Asia Rainbow TV Awards	Outstanding Host Award	Ah Ma Can Cook	Won	
2019	Star Awards	All-Time Favourite Artiste	—N/a	Won	
2021	Star Awards	Best Actress	My Guardian Angels (as Wu Miao Miao)	Nominated	
2021	Star Awards	Best Supporting Actress	Day Break (as Zhang Tianqing)	Won	
2021	Star Awards	Best Programme Host	Ah Gong Can Cook	Nominated	
2022	Star Awards	Best Programme Host	Old Taste Detective S2	Nominated	
2022	Star Awards	Perfect Combo (with Chen Liping)	HDB Tai Tai 4.0	Nominated	
2022	Asian Television Awards	Best Entertainment Presenter/Host	Old Taste Detective 3	Nominated	
2023	Star Awards	Best Supporting Actress	When Duty Calls 2 (as Loke Meiguang)	Nominated	
2024	Star Awards	Best Actress	Till the End (as Yang Kehua)	Won	
2024	Star Awards	Best Programme Host	Old Taste Detective S4	Nominated	
