= Bryan Wong =

Singaporean television host and actor (born 1971)

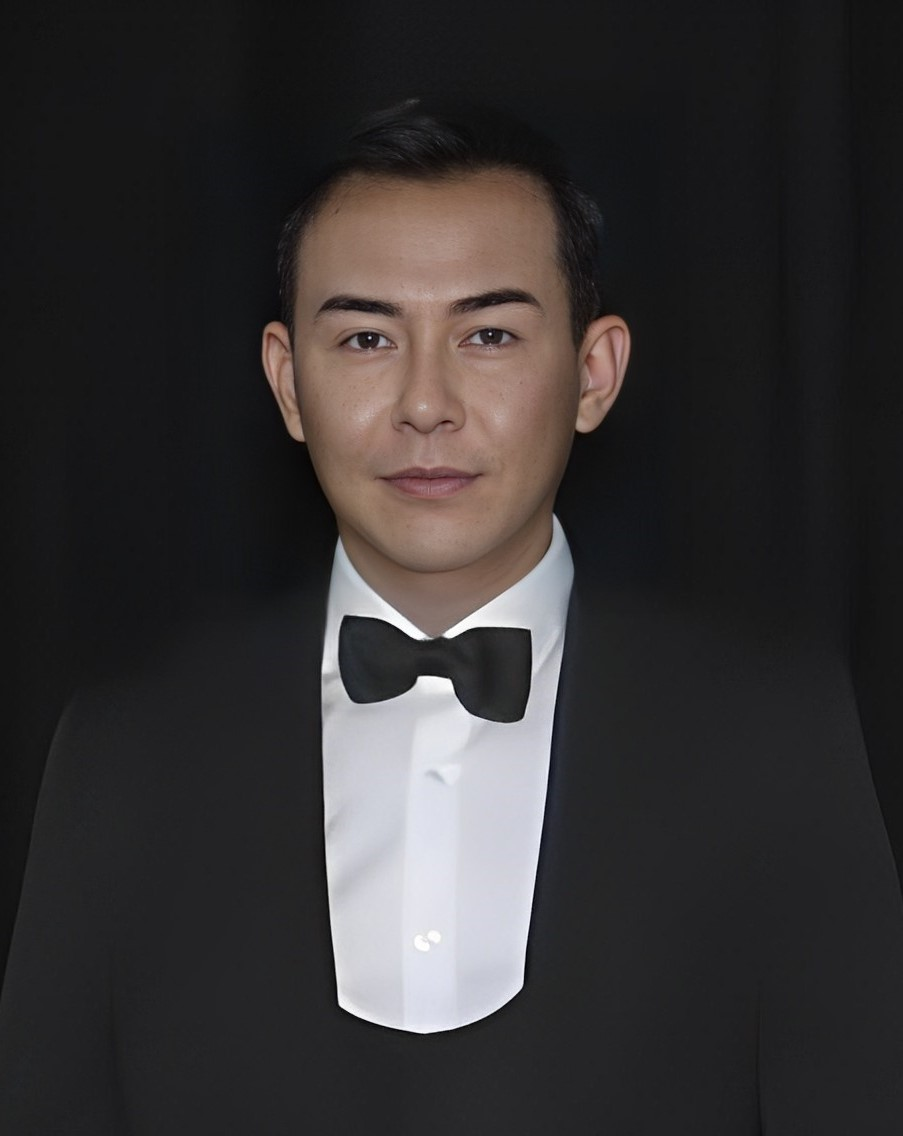
- Wong at the Star Awards 2017
- Born: 30 January 1971 (age 55); Singapore
- Other name: Wang Lujiang
- Education: Tanjong Katong Secondary Technical School
- Occupations: Television host; actor; businessman; film director; producer
- Years active: 1981–present
- Awards: Full list

Chinese name
- Traditional Chinese: 王祿江
- Simplified Chinese: 王禄江
- Hanyu Pinyin: Wáng Lùjiāng
- Jyutping: Wong4 Luk6 Gong1
- Hokkien POJ: Ông Lo̍k-kang

Bryan Wong Lok Kiang (born 30 January 1971) is a Singaporean television host, actor and businessman.

== Career ==
Wong began his career as a child actor in 1981 and featured in several popular children's programmes on the Singapore Broadcasting Corporation. He began performing modelling assignments and commercials while still a teenager. In 1994, he joined Television Corporation of Singapore as a full-time artiste after a short stint as an interior designer. Although his first hosting role was for the teenage lifestyle programme Gen Y, it was the infotainment programme City Beat during the late 1990s that first exposed him to television audiences. While his co-hosts Kym Ng and Sharon Au were winning awards at the annual Star Awards, he was not well received by the general public. He later stated that he had planned to resign several times but did not have a choice as he had to support his family. In 2000, he and several fellow artistes left TCS to join the newly formed SPH MediaWorks. While with MediaWorks, he became known for co-hosting Channel U's popular talent-search show Snap with Ng and their partnership was praised by audiences. He was nominated for Best Entertainment Presenter at the 2002 Asian Television Awards. In 2005, MediaCorp (successor of TCS) absorbed MediaWorks and he was one of nineteen artistes transferred over.

As an actor, Wong is a recognised face in mainland China after starring in a number of China, Hong Kong and Taiwan productions while with SPH MediaWorks, most notably in Eternity: A Chinese Ghost Story and the wuxia series Chinese Paladin. He played the main lead role in MediaWorks' final drama series Zero and also starred in Honour and Passion opposite Tay Ping Hui, Huang Wenyong and Rui En.

Since returning to MediaCorp, Wong has enjoyed more success as a host. He co-hosted the popular long-running home makeover show Home Decor Survivor (摆家乐) with Mark Lee, for which he won his first hosting award, the Best Variety Show Host award, at the 2006 Star Awards. He won the Favourite Variety Show Host audience poll, beating hot favourite Fann Wong, at the 2012 Star Awards.

In 2019, Wong directed the short film The Playbook which starred Ayden Sng and Sheila Sim.

== Ventures ==
He co-owns an interior design firm called Home by Bryan Wong which does not accept walk-in customers.

== Personal life ==
Wong grew up in a kampong in Kembangan in 1970s–80s Singapore. He lives with his sister Varilyn "Val" and his mother Margaret in an apartment in Bedok.

Wong was educated at Tanjong Katong Secondary Technical School, where he first discovered an interest in "do it yourself" interior designing and carpentry.

== Filmography ==
=== Television series ===
Year	Title	Role	Notes	Ref.
1994	Masters of the Sea	Andrew Cheng		
2001	Wonderful Life: Aspirations (奇妙人生之理想)			
2001	Healing Hearts (侠骨仁心)	Lin Qiming		
2001	Ad-war (完美把戏)	Takeshi		
2002	Back to Basics (重进森林)	Alvin		
2002	Cash is King	Qi Lai		
2003	A Chinese Ghost Story	Ren Wuwei		
2004	Zero	Sam Wong		
2004	Chinese Paladin	Liu Jinyuan		
2007	Honour and Passion	Poh Mun Chong		
2013	Gonna Make It	Liu Ah Man		
2014	In the Name of Love	Fang Yaoliang		
2015	You Can Be an Angel Too	Xie Yaozong		
2015	Love?	Bryan		
2015	Hand In Hand	Hong Meiqiang		
2015	Hand In Hand	Hong Jincai	Cameo	
2016	The Dream Job	Variety host	Cameo	
2016	You Can Be an Angel 2	Xie Yaozong		
2017	118 II	Liu Jizhou		
2018	Reach For The Skies	Fang Zixin		
2018	You Can Be an Angel 3 (你也可以是天使3)	Xie Yaozong	Cameo	
2019	KIN: Matthew's Story	Cheong		
2019	While You Were Away (一切从昏睡开始)	Zhong Liqun		
2019	Day Break (天空渐渐亮)	Wu Renxing		
2020	Terror Within (内颤)	Chen Weide		
2020	Who Did It? (谁是凶手？)	Li Yicong		
2020	A Quest to Heal	Sun Xi		
2021	The Heartland Hero	Bao Daowang		
2022	Soul Doctor (灵医)	Sergeant D / Hong Zeren		
2022	Soul Detective	Sergeant D / Hong Zeren		

=== Film ===
Year	Title	Role	Notes	Ref.
2019	The Playbook	—N/a	Short film; as director	

=== Special programmes ===
- 1994
  - Launch of Television Corporation of Singapore (TCS) on 1 October

=== Variety and infotainment programmes ===
- 1994
  - 能耐极限大挑战
  - Gen-Y Y-人王
- 1995
  - 脑力加油站
- 1995–2000
  - City Beat 城人杂志
- 1996
  - Mavis Hee Mini Concert 许美静迷你音乐会
  - Jacky Cheung Mini Concert 张学友迷你音乐会
  - Mooncake Festival Variety Show
- 1998
  - Comedy Nite 1998 搞笑行动 1998
- 1999
  - Comedy Nite 1999 搞笑行动 1999
- 2000–2001
  - Dream Challengers 圆梦新计划
  - Happy Rules 开心就好
  - 'Live' Unlimited 综艺无界限
  - S.N.A.P.
- 2002
  - Snap Special – Chinese New Year 全星总动员 – 新年特别版
  - Snap 2 全星总动员 2
  - Happy Rules 开心就好
  - Ready Steady Go 全民出动抢鲜玩
  - Snap Special – Channel U's 2nd Year Anniversary 全星总动员 – 优频道2周年纪念版
- 2003
  - Ren Ci Charity Show 2003 仁心慈爱照万千2003 (Performance: Flag dance)
  - Add Your Service 服务加加加
  - Snap Special – Romance Of The Book and Sword 全星总动员 – 书剑总动员版
  - Ready Steady Go II 全民出动抢鲜玩 2
  - Precious Home 家有宝贝
  - Everybody's Talking – (Translator of Hainanese for SARS prevention programme) 人人有话说 – 担任海南翻译
  - Oooh! 元气大搜查
- 2004
  - Ren Ci Charity Show 2004 仁心慈爱照万千2004 (Performance: Fire twirling stunt)
  - Snap 3 全星总动员 3
  - Mall & More 夺宝三响炮
  - Street Wise 街头大排党
- 2005
  - Ren Ci Charity Show 2005 仁心慈爱照万千2005 (Duo car stunt performance (With Xie Shao Guang))
  - Lunar New Year's Eve Special – Year Of Rooster 天鸡报喜贺新春
  - KP Club 鸡婆俱乐部
  - 101 Shopping Guide 陪你去Shopping
  - The NKF Cancer Show 1 群星照亮千万心之风雨同舟献真心 (Duo performance (With Kym Ng): Impersonation/costume changing skit)
  - Foodball Tic Tac Goal 食在好球
  - Rail Adventure 男得风光
  - Love Bites 2 缘来就是你2
  - Star Idol 明星偶像
  - The Cancer Charity Show 癌过有晴天
  - Home Decor Survivor 摆家乐
  - I Love Shopping II 陪你去Shopping 2
  - Cenosis Show
  - Affairs Of The Heart 2005 心手相连2005
- 2006
  - Ren Ci Charity Show 2006 仁心慈爱照万千2006 (外景主持)
  - Dollar & Sense 神机妙算
  - Its Showtime! (Judge) 全民创意争霸赛 (评审)
  - Giant Stars 2006 Giant 星光灿烂 2006
  - Where The Queue Starts 排排站，查查看
  - The Ultimate Comedian 爆笑新人王
  - What's Art? 什么艺思?
  - The 7-Eleven Game Show 7-Eleven抢先夺快争第一
  - Home Decor Survivor 2 摆家乐 2
  - Who's Naughty and Nice 黑白讲
- 2007
  - Ren Ci Charity Show 2007 仁心慈爱照万千2007 (Piano performance: Ebony & Ivory)
  - Lunar New Year's Eve Special – Year Of Pig 金猪贺岁庆肥年 (@ Studio)
  - Chingay Parade Of Dreams 2007 妆艺大游行 之 奇思梦想 2007
  - Where The Queue Starts 2 排排站，查查看 2
  - Giant Stars 2007 星光灿烂 2007
  - BRAND'S Stay Sharp Stay In Game 眼明心清我最行
  - Citispa Beauty Perfection 2 Citispa 完美大挑战 2
  - Maria Not At Home Maria 今天不在家
  - Law by Law 赢了Law
  - Home Decor Survivor 3 摆家乐 3
  - My Star Guide 2 – Tasmania 我的导游是明星 2 (Last Episode)
  - Princesses and the Dude 扮美达人
- 2008
  - Fortune Festival at Giant 2008 爱上Giant过肥年 2008
  - Lunar New Year's Eve Special – Year of Mouse 八方祥瑞鼠来宝 (@ Studio, Host/Skit performance)
  - Chingay Parade Of Dreams 2008 妆艺大游行 之 奇思梦想 2008
  - Glamour Mum and The Dude 辣妈好时尚
  - Giant Stars 2008 Giant 星光灿烂 2008
  - Citispa 完美大挑战 3 Citispa Beauty Perfection 3
  - Junior Home Decor Survivor 迷你摆家乐 (as Mentor)
  - My Star Guide 3 – Turkey 我的导游是明星3 – 土耳其
  - Find Me A New Boss 职场大哥大
- 2009
  - Lunar New Year's Eve Special – Year of Ox 牛转乾坤喜临门 (@ Studio)
  - Fortune Festival at Giant 2009 爱上Giant过肥年 2009
  - Destination Most Wanted 优游天下 (Took 9 months to film in 2008)
  - Where The Queue Starts 3 排排站，查查看 3
  - The Chinese Challenge 2009 (Guest) 华文? 谁怕谁! 2009 (嘉宾)
  - Live a Life U质人生
  - Fashion Asia 亚洲时尚风 – Bangkok 曼谷
  - Food Hometown 2 – Hainan 美食寻根 – 海南
  - Result is All 美就是一切
  - My Star Guide 4 – Turkey 我的导游是明星4 – 瑞士
  - Home Decor Survivor 4 摆家乐4
  - New City Beat 城人新杂志
  - SPD Charity Show 2009 真情无障碍 2009 (Stunt challenge: 3 hours non-stop treadmill running)
  - SMRT Challenge 2009 SMRT大挑战 2009
- 2010
  - Fortune Festival at Giant 2010 爱上Giant过肥年 2010
  - Lunar New Year's Eve Special 2010 普天同庆金虎年2010
  - Citispa Beauty Perfection 2
  - New City Beat 2 城人新杂志 2
  - Don't Forget The Lyrics (Celebrities series) 我要唱下去 (艺人版 Celebrities series) (Guest appearance)
  - Giant Stars 2010 Giant 星光灿烂 2010
  - Behind Every Job 美差事, 苦差事
  - Singapore Hit Awards 2010 新加坡金曲奖 (Guest awards presenter)
  - Under 1 Roof @ Courts 家家有Courts 家家乐
  - 3 Plus 1 Series 2 三菜一汤 2 I.(as Guest, VS 李铭顺) II.(as Guest, partner with Nono VS 黄靖伦&何维健)
  - 2010 Golden Awards 金视奖2010
  - Adventures with SMRT SMRT新游记
- 2011
  - Lunar New Year's Eve Special – Year of Rabbit 金兔呈祥喜迎春 (@ Chinatown, Guest performance)
  - Fortune Festival at Giant 2011 爱上GIANT 过肥年 2011
  - Chingay 2011 妆艺大游行 2011
  - Star Awards 2011 Show 1 红星大奖2011第一场
  - SPD Charity Show 2011 真情无障碍 2011 (Performance: Mouth art painting in 3 hours)
  - Renaissance 旧欢.心爱
  - Makan Unlimited 新马美食一家亲
  - Under 1 Roof @ Courts 家家有Courts, 家家乐!
  - Volkswagen Treasure Trails Volkswagen 寻宝乐
  - 3 Plus 1 Series 3 三菜一汤3 (as Guest, VS 林明伦)
  - Buffet Buffet 2 永远吃不肥 2 (as Panel of Critics 美食鉴定团, Ep 2)
  - Behind Every Job 2 美差事, 苦差事2
  - My Star Guide 6 – Eastern Europe (Finland/Sweden/Norway/Denmark) 我的导游是名星 6 – 东欧 (芬兰/瑞典/挪威/丹麦)
  - SMRT Challenge 2011 SMRT大挑战 2011
- 2012
  - Lunar New Year's Eve Special – Year of Dragon 金龙腾飞庆丰年 (@ Studio, Guest appearance)
  - The Art Effect 处处有艺术
  - Knock Knock Who's There 啊! 是你到我家
  - Fortune Festival at Giant 2012 爱上GIANT过肥年 2012
  - Way To Go, Singapore! 新加坡, 自有一套!
  - "东方水城 梦幻之夜" 第十五届中国苏州国际旅游节开幕式暨第二届金鸡湖商务旅游节启动仪式
  - Just Noodles 面对面 (Guest appearance, Ep 14)
  - Share Something 我爱公开
  - Jobs Around the World 走遍天涯打工乐
  - S.N.A.P. 熠熠星光总动员
  - 2012 Golden Awards 金视奖2012
- 2013
  - Fortune Festival at Giant 2013 爱上Giant过肥年 2013
  - Behind Every Job 3 美差事, 苦差事之帮你找事做
  - My Great Partner 大小拍档
  - The I-Weekly Show i不释手
  - Where The Queue Starts 4 排排站，查查看4
- 2014
  - Fortune Festival at Giant 2014 爱上Giant过肥年 2014
  - Minute to Win It : Singapore
  - Hear Me Out 有话要说
- 2015
  - Fortune Festival at Giant 2015 爱上Giant过肥年 2015

== Awards and nominations ==
Year	Award	Category	Nominated work	Result	Ref
1998	Star Awards	Best Variety Show Host	City Beat	Nominated	
1998	Star Awards	Top 10 Most Popular Male Artistes	—N/a	Won	
1999	Star Awards	Top 10 Most Popular Male Artistes	—N/a	Won	
2002	Asian Television Awards	Best Drama Performance by an Actor	Baker in Wonderful Life – Aspirations	Nominated	
2002	Asian Television Awards	Best Comedy Performance by an Actor	Alvin in Back To Basics	Won	
2002	Asian Television Awards	Best Entertainment Presenter	Snap	Nominated	
2005	Star Awards	Best Comedy Performer	KP Club	Won	
2005	Star Awards	Best Variety Show Host	101 Shopping Guide	Nominated	
2005	Star Awards	Top 10 Most Popular Male Artistes	—N/a	Won	
2006	Star Awards	Best Variety Show Host	Home Décor Survivor	Won	
2006	Star Awards	Top 10 Most Popular Male Artistes	—N/a	Won	
2007	Star Awards	Best Variety Show Host	Home Décor Survivor 2	Nominated	
2007	Star Awards	Top 10 Most Popular Male Artistes	—N/a	Won	
2009	Star Awards	Top 10 Most Popular Male Artistes	—N/a	Won	
2010	Star Awards	Best Info-Ed Programme Host	Food Hometown 2	Won	
2010	Star Awards	Top 10 Most Popular Male Artistes	—N/a	Won	
2011	Star Awards	Best Info-Ed Programme Host	Behind Every Job	Nominated	
2011	Star Awards	Top 10 Most Popular Male Artistes	—N/a	Won	
2011	Star Awards	Best Variety Show Host	Home Décor Survivor 4	Nominated	
2011	Star Awards	Favourite Onscreen Partner (Variety)	—N/a	Nominated	
2012	Star Awards	Best Variety Show Host	Home Décor Survivor 4	Nominated	
2012	Star Awards	Best Variety Show Host	Rénaissance	Nominated	
2012	Star Awards	Best Info-Ed Programme Host	Behind Every Job 2	Nominated	
2012	Star Awards	Top 10 Most Popular Male Artistes	—N/a	Won	
2012	Star Awards	Favourite Variety Show Host	—N/a	Won	
2013	Star Awards	Best Variety Show Host	Jobs Around The World	Nominated	
2013	Star Awards	Best Variety Show Host	Makan Unlimited	Nominated	
2013	Star Awards	Top 10 Most Popular Male Artistes	—N/a	Won	
2014	Star Awards	Best Actor	Gonna Make It	Nominated	
2014	Star Awards	Most Popular Regional Artiste (Malaysia)	—N/a	Nominated	
2014	Star Awards	All-Time Favourite Artiste	—N/a	Won	
2015	Star Awards	Best Info-Ed Programme Host	Hear Me Out	Nominated	
2015	Star Awards	Most Popular Regional Artiste (Indonesia)	—N/a	Nominated	
2017	Star Awards	Best Programme Host	Hear Me Out 2	Nominated	
2019	Star Awards	Best Programme Host	Hear Me Out 4	Nominated	
2021	Star Awards	Best Supporting Actor	A Quest to Heal (as Sun Xi)	Won	
2023	Star Awards	Best Programme Host	Old Taste Detective S3	Nominated	
2025	Star Awards	Best Programme Host	Makan On Wheels	Nominated	
