= Star Awards for Best Variety Show Host =

Singaporean television award (1998–2015)

Star Awards for Best Variety Show Host 最佳综艺主持人
- Awarded for: Best Performance by a Mediacorp Host in a Variety Show
- Country: Singapore
- Presented by: Mediacorp
- First award: 1998
- Final award: 2015
- Currently held by: Vacant

The Star Awards for Best Variety Show Host was an award presented annually at the Star Awards, a ceremony that was established in 1994.

The category was introduced in 1998, at the 5th Star Awards ceremony; Kym Ng received the award for her performance in City Beat and it is given in honour of a Mediacorp host who has delivered an outstanding performance in a variety show. The nominees were determined by a team of judges employed by Mediacorp; winners are selected by a majority vote from the entire judging panel.

Since its inception, the award was given to seven hosts. Pornsak is the most recent and final winner in this category for his performance in The Joy Truck II. Sharon Au, Mark Lee, and Kym Ng are the only hosts to win in this category four times, surpassing Quan Yi Fong who has two wins. In addition, Lee and Ng were nominated on nine occasions, more than any other host. Dasmond Koh, Lee Teng, and Jeff Wang hold the record for the most nominations without a win, with four.

The award was discontinued from 2016 as all performances in the hosting category (variety, info-ed) were shifted to the newly formed Best Programme Host category.

== Recipients ==
| Year | Host | Title | Nominees | Ref. |
|---|---|---|---|---|
| 1998 | Kym Ng | City Beat 城人杂志 | Sharon Au 欧菁仙 — NKF 5th Anniversary Charity Show 1998 群星照亮千万心之新视艺人齐献力; Guo Liang 郭亮 — 4th Dimension 异度空间; Wang Yanqing 王嬿青 — A Date With Yanqing 嬿青有约; Bryan Wong 王禄江 — City Beat 城人杂志 | |
| 1999 | Kym Ng | City Beat 城人杂志 | Sharon Au 欧菁仙 — City Beat 城人杂志; Guo Liang 郭亮 — Disclosure 亮出真相; Diana Ser 徐秀盈 — Entertainment Beat 绝对星闻; Wang Yanqing 王嬿青 — A Date With Yanqing 嬿青有约 | |
| 2000 | Sharon Au | City Beat 城人杂志 | Chen Shucheng 陈澍城 — PSC Nite 普威之夜; Huang Bingjie 黄炳杰 — Battle of the Best 强中自有强中手; Dasmond Koh 许振荣 — Celebrity Telematch 全能大赢家; Jack Neo 梁志强 — NKF 7th Anniversary Charity Show 2000 群星照亮千万心之新传媒艺人齐献力 | |
| 2001 | Sharon Au | City Beat 城人杂志 | Chen Shucheng 陈澍城 — Weekend Delight 赢万金游万里欢乐周末夜; Dasmond Koh 许振荣 — I Entertainment I娱乐; Mark Lee 李国煌 — Top Fun 欢乐巅峰; Jack Neo 梁志强 — Top Fun 欢乐巅峰 | |
| 2002 | Sharon Au | City Beat 城人杂志 | Dennis Chew 周崇庆 — One Fun Day 惊喜一整天; Dasmond Koh 许振荣 — The Mission 创业无敌手; Mark Lee 李国煌 — One Fun Day 惊喜一整天; Jeff Wang 王振復 — City Beat 城人杂志 | |
| 2003 | Sharon Au | City Beat 城人杂志 | Bukoh Mary 巫许玛莉 — TGIF 周五越Live越精彩; Dennis Chew 周崇庆 — Innocent Moments 小小儿戏; Dasmond Koh 许振荣 — The Mission II 创业无敌手2; Jeff Wang 王振復 — City Beat 城人杂志 | |
| 2004 | Mark Lee | Be My Guest 客人来 | Sharon Au 欧菁仙 — Spring and Slide 威力无比加油站; Marcus Chin 陈建彬 — King of Variety 周五娱乐王; Michelle Chong 庄米雪 — All in NETS NETS有钱坤; Jeff Wang 王振復 — All in NETS NETS有钱坤 | |
| 2005 | Quan Yi Fong | Love Bites 缘来就是你 | Mark Lee 李国煌 — Say It If You Dare 有话好好说; Kym Ng 鐘琴 — Love Bites 缘来就是你; Jeff Wang 王振復 — Project SuperStar (Grand Final) 绝对SuperStar（总决赛）; Bryan Wong 王禄江 — 101 Shopping Guide 陪你去Shopping | |
| 2006 | Bryan Wong | Home Decor Survivor 摆家乐 | Mark Lee 李国煌 — Property Classified 吉屋出售; Kym Ng 鐘琴 — Love Bites II 缘来就是你II; Quan Yi Fong 权怡凤 — What's Art? 什么艺思？; Ben Yeo 杨志龙 — It's Showtime! 全民创意争霸赛 | |
| 2007 | Mark Lee | Say It If You Dare 3 有话好好说3 | Guo Liang 郭亮 — Lead Me On 贤人指路; Quan Yi Fong 权怡凤 — King of Thrift SMART省钱王; Cavin Soh 苏梽诚 — Where the Queue Starts 2 排排站，查查看2; Bryan Wong 王禄江 — Home Decor Survivor 2 摆家乐2 | |
| 2009 | Guo Liang | CelebriTea Break 艺点心思 | Marcus Chin 陈建彬 — Golden Age Singing Contest 2008 黄金年华之斗歌竞艺2008; Christopher Lee 李铭顺 — Life Transformers 心晴大动员; Lee Teng 李腾 — On the Beat 3 都是大发现3; Kym Ng 鐘琴 — Buzzing Cashiers 抢摊大行动; Quan Yi Fong 权怡凤 — Life Transformers 心晴大动员 | |
| 2010 | Mark Lee | It's a Small World 国记交意所 | Dennis Chew 周崇庆 — Paris and Milan 女王本色; Guo Liang 郭亮 — CelebriTea Break II 艺点心思II; Lee Teng 李腾 — On the Beat 4 都是大发现4; Quan Yi Fong 权怡凤 — Buzzing Cashiers 2 抢摊大行动2 | |
| 2011 | Kym Ng | Love on a Plate 名厨出走记 | Michelle Chong 庄米雪 — Black Rose 爆料黑玫瑰; Guo Liang 郭亮 — Black Rose 爆料黑玫瑰; Pornsak — Food Source 食在好源头; Bryan Wong 王禄江 — Home Decor Survivor 4 摆家乐4 | |
| 2012 | Mark Lee | It's a Small World II 国记交意所II | Lee Teng 李腾 — Rail Thrill 铁路次文化; Kym Ng 鐘琴 — Chef Apprentice 名厨实习生; Pornsak — Food Source II 食在好源头II; Bryan Wong 王禄江 — Renaissance 旧欢.心爱 | |
| 2013 | Kym Ng | Jobs Around the World 走遍天涯打工乐 | Guo Liang 郭亮 — United Neighbours Society 邻里合作社; Pornsak — Food Source III 食在好源头III; Cavin Soh 苏梽诚 — Knock! Knock! Who's There? 啊！是你到我家！; Bryan Wong 王禄江 — Jobs Around the World 走遍天涯打工乐 | |
| 2014 | Quan Yi Fong | Finding U 寻U先锋 | Guo Liang 郭亮 — Counter Fake 识货衙门; Vivian Lai 赖怡伶 — Say It! 好好说 慢慢讲; Kym Ng 鐘琴 — Finding U 寻U先锋; Pornsak — The Joy Truck 快乐速递 | |
| 2015 | Pornsak | The Joy Truck II 快乐速递II | Mark Lee — Neighbourhood Chef 邻里厨王; Lee Teng — Finding 8; Quan Yi Fong — Black Rose 2; Ben Yeo — Finding 8 | |

^{^[I]} Each year is linked to the article about the Star Awards held that year.

== Category facts ==
Most wins

| Host | Wins |
|---|---|
| Sharon Au; Mark Lee; Kym Ng | 4 |
| Quan Yi Fong | 2 |

Most nominations

| Host | Nominations |
|---|---|
| Mark Lee Kym Ng | 9 |
| Guo Liang | 8 |
| Sharon Au; Quan Yi Fong; Bryan Wong | 7 |
| Pornsak | 5 |
| Dasmond Koh; Lee Teng; Jeff Wang | 4 |
| Dennis Chew | 3 |
| Chen Shucheng; Marcus Chin; Michelle Chong; Jack Neo; Cavin Soh; Wang Yanqing; Ben Yeo | 2 |
