= Ke Le =

Singapore-born host (born 1997)

- Born: Lau Jia Yi; 11 June 1997 (age 28); Singapore
- Other names: Sun Cola; Liu Jiayi
- Occupations: Host; singer; actress; businesswoman
- Years active: 2018–present

Stage name
- Traditional Chinese: 可樂
- Simplified Chinese: 可乐
- Hanyu Pinyin: Kělè

Birth name
- Traditional Chinese: 劉嘉宜
- Simplified Chinese: 刘嘉宜
- Hanyu Pinyin: Liú Jiāyí

Alternative stage name
- Traditional Chinese: 陽光可樂
- Simplified Chinese: 阳光可乐
- Hanyu Pinyin: Yángguāng kělè

Ke Le (born Lau Jia Yi on 11 June 1997), also known as Yang Guang Ke Le, is a host, singer, actress and businesswoman. Born in Singapore, Lau grew up in Johor Bahru, Malaysia and started performing in the Johor Bahru getai industry at age 12. She was discovered by a Singaporean getai organiser to perform in Singapore in 2013. She entered the Singapore television scene in 2018 after finishing in the top five of the singing competition, GeTai Challenge. Since then, Lau has hosted programmes such as Curious City (2021) and appeared as a contestant on the reality show Streamers Go Live (2022). She has also starred in the Jack Neo film, Ah Girls Go Army, in 2022.

== Early life ==
Lau is the youngest of three children. Her father is a renovations worker, while her mother used to be her manager who drove her to her getai shows. Lau's parents used to own four restaurants in Malaysia before Lau was 12, but were forced to close all businesses during an economy recession. Lau eventually dropped out of school at age 15 to help out with her family's financial situation.

== Ventures ==
Lau and her elder brother opened a café named Loft Café by V at Taman Impian Emas in Johor Bahru in September 2022.

== Filmography ==
Lau has appeared in the following programmes and films:

=== Television series ===
- Old Is Gold (2019)
- 321 Action! (2021; webseries)
- The Takedown (2021)
- Gong Dou Gong Lüe (2022; AMM webseries)
- I'm Actor Ah De (2022; webseries)
- Whatever Will Be, Will Be (2023; dialect series)

=== Film ===
- Ah Girls Go Army (2022)
- Ah Girls Go Army Again (2022)

=== Variety show ===
- GeTai Challenge (2018; season 2; as contestant)
- Says Who Who (2019)
- Ah Gong Can Cook (2019)
- SG Explorers (2019)
- Happy Go Lucky 1 (2019)
- Thumbs Up! Senior - Takeover (2019)
- Deals for Joy (2020)
- Kitchen Alchemy (2020)
- Happy Go Lucky 2 (2020)
- Happy Great World (2020; season 1)
- Money's Here! (2020)
- Happy Great World (2021; season 2)
- Curious City (2021; season 1)
- SPOP WAVE! (2021)
- Star Awards 2022 Backstage Live (2022)
- Retire Well with MoneySense (2022)
- Streamers Go Live (2022)
- Beyond the Script (2022)
- The Star Athlete (2023)
- Star Awards 2023 Backstage Live (2023)
- Rookies' Kitchen (2023)

== Discography ==
=== Singles ===
Year	Song title	Notes
2022	"Wèi shěn mò: Wèishéme?"	Gong Dou Gong Lüe theme song

== Awards and nominations ==
Organisation	Year	Category	Nominated work	Result	Ref
Star Awards	2021	Best Newcomer	Ah Gong Can Cook	Nominated	
Star Awards	2021	Top 10 Most Popular Female Artistes	—N/a	Nominated	
Star Awards	2022	Best Programme Host	Curious City	Nominated	
Star Awards	2022	My Pick! Perfect Combo	Curious City	Nominated	
Star Awards	2023	Top 3 Most Popular Rising Stars	—N/a	Nominated	
Star Awards	2024	Top 3 Most Popular Rising Stars	—N/a	Nominated	
Star Awards	2025	Top 3 Most Popular Rising Stars	—N/a	Nominated	
