= Guo Liang (actor) =

Singaporean-Chinese host and actor (born 1970)

- Born: Shanghai, China
- Citizenship: Singaporean
- Education: Shanghai Drama Institute
- Occupations: Host; actor; radio deejay
- Years active: 1994–present
- Agents: Mediacorp; The Celebrity Agency
- Spouse: Jade Shen Jie (m. 1994)
- Children: 1
- Awards: Full list

Chinese name
- Chinese: 郭亮
- Hanyu Pinyin: Guō Liàng

Guo Liang is a Chinese-born Singaporean actor, television host and radio deejay.

== Career ==
Guo graduated from the Shanghai Drama Institute and moved to Singapore during the 1990s to join the Television Corporation of Singapore (predecessor of MediaCorp). He joined TCS in 1994. He joined SPH MediaWorks in late 2000 but returned to MediaCorp in 2005 when the two companies merged. Although trained as an actor, he is mostly known in Singapore as television host of several MediaCorp Channel 8 programmes, including the current affairs show Hello Singapore.

In 2019, Guo hosted the dating variety show titled The Destined One.

Guo is currently a guest presenter with Love 97.2FM. He is also an acting coach.

In 2026, Guo co-hosted Star Awards 2026 with Cheryl Chou and Zhang Zetong, where he won his tenth Most Popular Male Artiste award and his second Best Programme Host award. For his tenth Most Popular Male Artiste award, Guo would be inducted as an All-Time Favourite Artiste at the next Star Awards.

== Personal life ==
Guo married Jade Shen Jie, a Chinese citizen, in 1994 and has a son. He took up Singaporean citizenship in either 2000 or 2001 while his wife took up Singaporean citizenship in 2015.

== Filmography ==
=== Television series ===
Year	Title	Role	Notes	Ref.
2005	Beyond The aXis of Truth II	Li Weizhong		
2006	Rhapsody in Blue	Ding Yixing		
2009	Table of Glory	He Shuai		
2010	Breakout	Yang Tianwei		
2012	Be Happy	Lan Yanzhi		
2012	Poetic Justice	Ouyang Qiu		
2013	The Dream Makers	Yao Jianguo		
2013	Sudden	Cheng Gaofeng		
2015	Crescendo	Wei Nian		
2016	The Truth Seekers	Ye Rongtao		
2016	Peace & Prosperity	You Yongfa		
2016	Hero	Alex		
2017	The Lead	Li Wei		
2017	Life Less Ordinary	Song Jueming		
2018	The Distance Between (下个路口遇见你)	Song Shanming		
2018	Heart To Heart (心点心)	Yue Tianhua		
2019	C.L.I.F. 5	Le Xiaotian / Quy Vuong		
2020	A Jungle Survivor (森林生存记)	Titan		
2021	CTRL	Liang Wendao		
2021	Old Soul yet Young (心里住着老灵魂)	Shi Qinglong		
2021	The Heartland Hero	Song Weihao	Cameo	
2022	You Can Be an Angel 4 (你也可以是天使4)	Zhang Jiangnan		
2022	The Unbreakable Bond (寄生)	Gu Zhaohua		
2022	Your World in Mine	Sam Koh		
2022	Soul Detective	Bai Zhenqiang		
2023	All That Glitters	Mo Yicong		
2025	Emerald Hill - The Little Nyonya Story	Gao Si		

=== Film ===
Year	Title	Role	Notes	Ref.
2011	It's a Great, Great World	Henry		
2013	Judgement Day	Dai Sijie		
2014	Unlucky Plaza	Baby Bear		
2014	Filial Party	Yoona's father		
2022	Reunion Dinner	Liu Lanting		

=== Selected show hosting ===
Year	Title	Notes	Ref.
2019	The Destined One		
2023	World Food (吃。东西)		

== Discography ==
=== Compilation albums ===
Year	English title	Mandarin title
2012	MediaCorp Music Lunar New Year Album 12	新传媒群星金龙接财神
2018	MediaCorp Music Lunar New Year Album 18	新传媒群星阿狗狗过好年
2019	MediaCorp Music Lunar New Year Album 19	新传媒群星猪饱饱欢乐迎肥年
2020	MediaCorp Music Lunar New Year Album 20	裕鼠鼠纳福迎春乐
2021	MediaCorp Music Lunar New Year Album 21	福满牛年Moo Moo乐

== Awards and nominations ==
Organisation	Year	Category	Nominated work	Result	Ref
Asian Television Awards	2001	Best Entertainment Presenter	You're OK, I'm OK	Nominated	
Asian Television Awards	2008	Best Entertainment Presenter	Lead Me On	Won (Note: (Shared with Quan Yi Fong))	
Star Awards	1997	Best Newcomer	—N/a	Nominated	
Star Awards	1997	Top 10 Most Popular Male Artistes	—N/a	Won	
Star Awards	1998	Best Variety Show Host	异度空间	Nominated	
Star Awards	1998	Top 10 Most Popular Male Artistes	—N/a	Won	
Star Awards	1999	Best Variety Show Host	亮出真相	Nominated	
Star Awards	1999	Top 10 Most Popular Male Artistes	—N/a	Won	
Star Awards	2005	Top 10 Most Popular Male Artistes	—N/a	Nominated	
Star Awards	2007	Best Variety Show Host	Lead Me On	Nominated	
Star Awards	2009	Best Variety Show Host	CelebriTEA Break	Won	
Star Awards	2009	Best Info-Ed Programme Host	Breaking Barriers	Nominated	
Star Awards	2010	Best Variety Show Host	CelebriTEA Break II	Nominated	
Star Awards	2010	Best Info-Ed Programme Host	Stars for a Cause	Nominated	
Star Awards	2010	Top 10 Most Popular Male Artistes	—N/a	Won	
Star Awards	2011	Best Variety Show Host	Black Rose	Nominated	
Star Awards	2011	Best Info-Ed Programme Host	Legendary Cuisine	Nominated	
Star Awards	2011	Top 10 Most Popular Male Artistes	—N/a	Nominated	
Star Awards	2012	Best Info-Ed Programme Host	Legendary Cuisine II	Nominated	
Star Awards	2012	Top 10 Most Popular Male Artistes	—N/a	Nominated	
Star Awards	2013	Best Variety Show Host	United Neighbours Society	Nominated	
Star Awards	2013	Best Info-Ed Programme Host	Project i Season 2	Nominated	
Star Awards	2013	Top 10 Most Popular Male Artistes	—N/a	Nominated	
Star Awards	2014	Best Supporting Actor	The Dream Makers	Won	
Star Awards	2014	Best Variety Show Host	Counter Fake	Nominated	
Star Awards	2014	Star Awards for Most Popular Regional Artiste (China)	—N/a	Nominated	
Star Awards	2014	Top 10 Most Popular Male Artistes	—N/a	Nominated	
Star Awards	2016	Best Programme Host	What Your School Doesn't Teach You	Nominated	
Star Awards	2016	Top 10 Most Popular Male Artistes	—N/a	Nominated	
Star Awards	2017	Best Programme Host	Your Thoughts Please?	Nominated	
Star Awards	2017	Top 10 Most Popular Male Artistes	—N/a	Nominated	
Star Awards	2018	Best Programme Host	Voices	Nominated	
Star Awards	2018	Top 10 Most Popular Male Artistes	—N/a	Won	
Star Awards	2019	Top 10 Most Popular Male Artistes	—N/a	Nominated	
Star Awards	2021	Best Supporting Actor	A Jungle Survivor	Nominated	
Star Awards	2021	Best Programme Host	The Destined One S2	Nominated	
Star Awards	2021	Top 10 Most Popular Male Artistes	—N/a	Won	
Star Awards	2022	Best Programme Host	The Inner Circle	Nominated	
Star Awards	2022	Top 10 Most Popular Male Artistes	—N/a	Won	
Star Awards	2022	Perfect Combo	Star Awards 2021	Nominated (Note: Shared with Quan Yi Fong)	
Star Awards	2022	Most Hated Villain	CTRL	Nominated	
Star Awards	2023	Top 10 Most Popular Male Artistes	—N/a	Won	
Star Awards	2023	Chan Brothers My Star Guide Award	—N/a	Nominated	
Star Awards	2024	Best Programme Host	The Zoe and Liang Show	Nominated	
Star Awards	2024	Top 10 Most Popular Male Artistes	—N/a	Nominated	
Star Awards	2025	Best Supporting Actor	To Be Loved	Nominated	
Star Awards	2025	Top 10 Most Popular Male Artistes	—N/a	Won	
Star Awards	2026	Best Programme Host	Star Awards 2025	Won	
Star Awards	2026	Top 10 Most Popular Male Artistes	—N/a	Won	
