= Lee Teng (actor) =

Taiwanese-born Singaporean television host (born 1982)

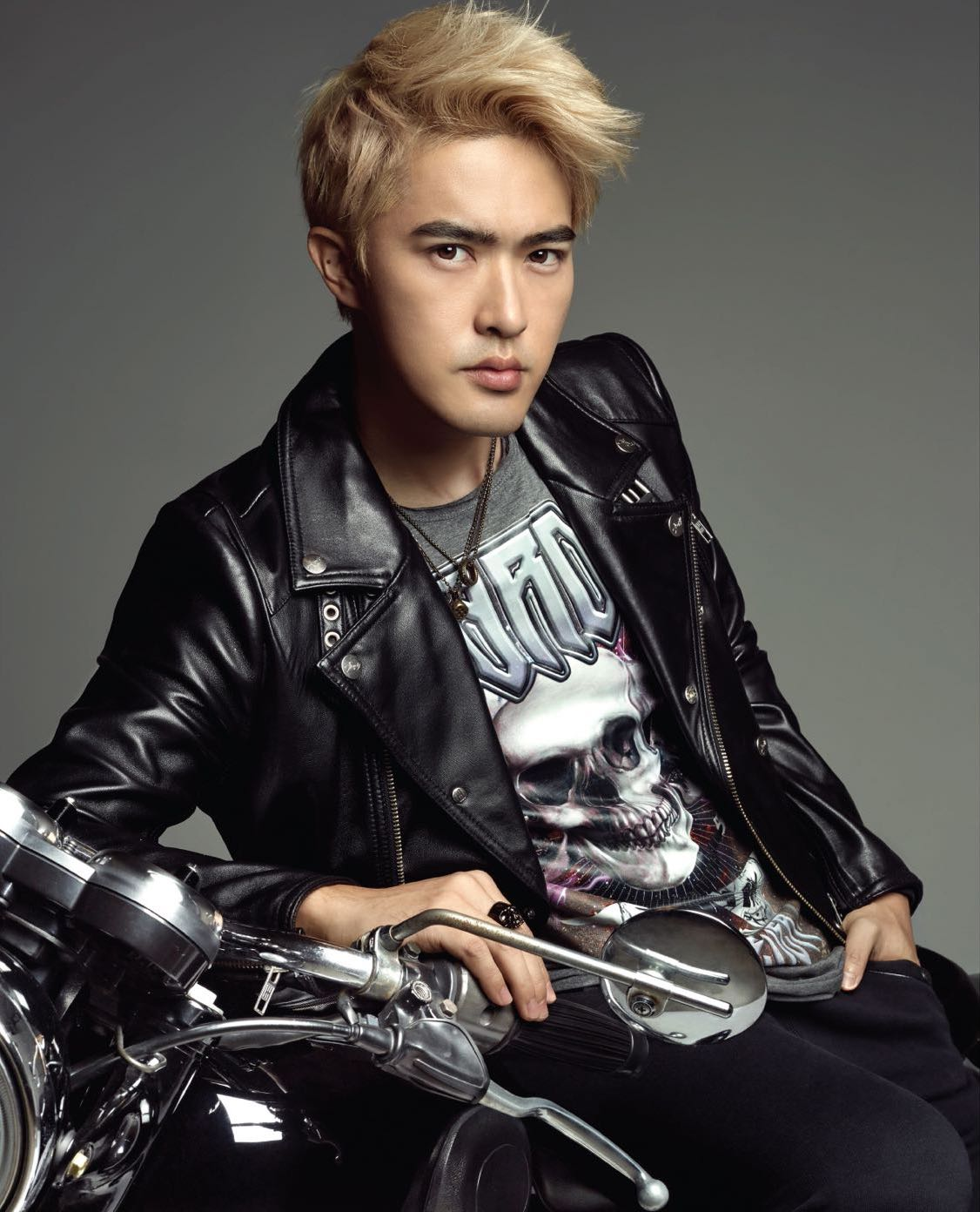
- Born: 30 May 1982 (age 44); Taiwan
- Education: Victoria School; Victoria Junior College
- Alma mater: Nanyang Technological University
- Occupations: Host; businessman; actor; radio DJ
- Years active: 2006−present
- Agent: Left Profile
- Spouse: Gina Lin (m. 2020)
- Children: 1
- Awards: Full list

Chinese name
- Traditional Chinese: 李騰
- Simplified Chinese: 李腾
- Hanyu Pinyin: Lǐ Téng

Lee Teng (born 30 May 1982) is a Taiwan-born Singaporean television host, businessman, radio deejay and occasional actor. Lee won the Top 10 Most Popular Male Artiste award and the Best Programme Host twice at the Star Awards. In 2017, he won an Asian Television Awards for Best Current Affairs Presenter.

== Early life ==
Lee was born in Taiwan and went to Singapore when he was nine. He studied primary school in Singapore. He graduated from Nanyang Technological University with a degree in accountancy.

Lee, however, did not serve his national duties in both conscription in Taiwan and National Service in Singapore despite having citizenship and permanent residency in both countries.

== Career ==
Lee was recruited by Mediacorp after winning the first runner-up in a talent show, SuperHost. He has since appeared on various variety shows and hosted some programmes, including the 2010, 2011, 2012, 2016, 2017 and 2018 Star Awards. Also, he is occasionally a guest deejay on Chinese language radio channel YES 933.

Lee has been accused of rigging votes during the 2015 Star Awards, in which Lee had asked his friend to design software for him to go online and repeatedly vote for himself, allegations which Lee denies.

Lee has won 6 Star Awards for Top 10 Most Popular Male Artistes from 2013-2017 and 2022.

== Business ventures ==
Lee used to run the Singapore outlet of streetwear brand Stage and the fashion store Ground Zero.

Lee co-owns a hair salon, Air Salon, located at The Cathay, with two business partners. The salon was converted into a salon-cum-cafe when they relocate the salon.

== Personal life ==
In 2018, Lee got into legal tussle with his business partner in court.

In 2019, Lee attended a training course at the film college of Shanghai Theatre Academy.

Lee began dating Gina Lin, a Singapore-based Taiwanese advertising executive, from October 2018, and then they were engaged on 24 March 2020. Lee announced his fiancee's pregnancy on 25 May 2020, but subsequently suffered a miscarriage. Lee and Lin registered their marriage in Singapore in June 2020.

== Selected filmography ==
=== Television show hosting ===
Year	Title	Notes	Ref
2006	Hey Hey Taxi 比比接車無比樂		
2006	PSC Nite 普威之夜		
2006	The 7-Eleven Game Show 7-Eleven抢先夺快争第一		
2006	Wanna Challenge 想挑戰嗎(外景)		
2007	Chinese New Year 101 溫故知新年		
2007	On The Beat II 都是大发现 II		
2007	Home Decor Survivor 3 摆家乐3		
2007	Super Train 遊學快車		
2008	Go Green 綠設兵團		
2008	On The Beat 3 都是大发现 3		
2008	Junior Home Decor Survivor 迷你擺家樂		
2009	On The Beat 4 都是大發現 4		
2009	Thai freedom 泰自由		
2009	Sizzling Woks 煮炒来咯！		
2009	Go Live! 综艺 GO LIVE!		
2009	Campus SuperStar (season 3) 校園SuperStar		
2010	Funtastic 太自游		
2010	Star Awards 2010 - Walk of Fame 紅星大獎星光大道		
2010	Star Awards 2010 - Post Party 紅星大獎慶功宴		
2010	On The Beat 5 都是大發現 5		
2010	Sizzling Woks 2 煮炒來咯 2		
2010	Singapore National Day Parade location host Live 新加坡國慶外景主持 Live		
2010	Let's Talk S1 你在囧什么? 1		
2010	Dream Potter 夢．窯匠		
2011	Let's Talk S2 你在囧什么? 2		
2011	紅星大獎慶功宴		
2011	明星志工隊 3		
2011	絕世好爸家人		
2011	K歌突擊隊		
2011	鐵路次文化		
2011	食品大贏家		
2011	第一屆新加坡電影節開幕主持		
2011	Sundown Festival戶外演唱會主持		
2011	新加坡跨年派對主持8频道 Live		
2012	林依晨KOSE代言宣傳活動主持		
2012	一心一德為善樂籌款晚會主持		
2012	IQ超人		
2012	紅星大獎慶功宴		
2012	Let's Talk S3 你在囧什么? 3		
2012	巨工廠		
2012	Body SOS S1 小毛病 大问题 1		
2012	紅星大獎星光大道		
2012	新加坡戲劇《花樣人間》記者會主持		
2012	新加坡跨年派對主持8频道 Live		
2012	新加坡農曆新年晚會主持8頻道 Live		
2013	我的師傅是大廚		
2013	巨工廠2		
2013	Let's Talk S4 你在囧什么? 4		
2013	Note To My Teenage Self 致昨日的我		
2013	Laughing Out Loud 笑笑没烦恼		
2013	Shoot It! S1 哪里出问题? 1		
2013	Finding U 寻U先锋		
2013	Body SOS S2 小毛病 大问题 2		
2014	Shoot It! S2 哪里出问题? 2 之食在有问题		
2014	Le Petit Chef 我的师傅是大厨		
2014	Let's Talk S5 你在囧什么? 5		
2015	Body SOS S3 小毛病 大问题 3		
2015	Body SOS S4 小毛病 大问题 4 健康上菜		
2015	Let's Talk S3 你在囧什么? 3		
2015	Let's Talk S4 你在囧什么? 4		
2016	Where To Stay? 到底住哪里？		
2016	Life's Big Factories 巨工厂		
2016	Big Factories 2: Made by Singapore! 巨工厂2 - 新加坡出品		
2016	Big Factories 3 巨工厂3		
2016	Body SOS S4 Health Carnival Special 小毛病 大问题 4 健康上菜		
2016	Body SOS S5 小毛病大问题 5		
2016	Yes Mdm 我的军官女友		
2016	The 4 Chefs 四大名厨		
2023	Fixer (线人)	Season 4	
2023	Let's Talk About Health (医聊大小事)		
2023	Battle of the Buskers		
2023	The Hunt	Online series	

=== Television series ===
Year	Title	Role	Notes	Ref
2005	Beautiful Illusions	Peter's friend		
2014	Served H.O.T. (烧.卖.)	He Taihu		
2015	Let It Go (分手快乐)	Tim		

=== Film ===
Year	Title	Role	Notes	Ref
2011	Already Famous	Himself		
2019	When Ghost Meets Zombie	Host		

== Discography ==
=== Compilation albums ===
Year	English title	Mandarin title
2012	MediaCorp Music Lunar New Year Album 12	新传媒群星金龙接财神
2018	MediaCorp Music Lunar New Year Album 18	新传媒群星阿狗狗过好年
2019	MediaCorp Music Lunar New Year Album 19	新传媒群星猪饱饱欢乐迎肥年
2020	MediaCorp Music Lunar New Year Album 20	裕鼠鼠纳福迎春了

== Awards and nominations ==
Year	Award	Category	Nominated work	Result	Ref
2009	Star Awards	Best Variety Show Host	On the Beat 3	Nominated	
2010	Star Awards	Best Variety Show Host	On the Beat 4	Nominated	
2012	Star Awards	Best Variety Show Host	Rail Thrill	Nominated	
2012	Star Awards	Best Info-Ed Programme Host	Let's Talk 2	Won	
2013	Star Awards	Best Info-Ed Programme Host	Life's Big Factories	Nominated	
2013	Star Awards	Top 10 Most Popular Male Artistes	—N/a	Won	
2014	Star Awards	Best Info-Ed Programme Host	Big Factories 2: Made by Singapore!	Nominated	
2014	Star Awards	Top 10 Most Popular Male Artistes	—N/a	Won	
2015	Star Awards	Best Variety Show Host	Finding 8	Nominated	
2015	Star Awards	Top 10 Most Popular Male Artistes	—N/a	Won	
2015	Star Awards	Most Popular Regional Artiste (Malaysia)	—N/a	Nominated	
2016	Star Awards	Best Programme Host	Love on The Plate 3	Won	
2016	Star Awards	Top 10 Most Popular Male Artistes	—N/a	Won	
2017	Asian Television Awards	Best Current Affairs Presenter	Fixer	Commendation	
2017	Star Awards	Best Programme Host	The 4 Chefs	Nominated	
2017	Star Awards	Top 10 Most Popular Male Artistes	—N/a	Won	
2018	Star Awards	Best Programme Host	Fixer	Nominated	
2018	Star Awards	Top 10 Most Popular Male Artistes	—N/a	Nominated	
2019	Star Awards	Top 10 Most Popular Male Artistes	—N/a	Nominated	
2022	Star Awards	Top 10 Most Popular Male Artistes	—N/a	Won	
2023	Star Awards	Top 10 Most Popular Male Artistes	—N/a	Nominated	
2024	Star Awards	Top 10 Most Popular Male Artistes	—N/a	Nominated	
2025	Star Awards	Top 10 Most Popular Male Artistes	—N/a	Nominated	
