= CTRL (TV series) =

Singaporean long-running TV series

- 操控
- Genre: Family; Romance; Drama; Socio-Drama
- Starring: Desmond Tan; Ya Hui; Denise Camillia Tan; Elvis Chin; Richie Koh
- Country of origin: Singapore
- Original languages: Mandarin, with some English dialogue
- No. of episodes: 25

Original release
- Network: Mediacorp Channel 8
- Release: March 1 – April 2, 2021

Related
- My Star Bride; Mind Jumper

CTRL (Chinese: 操控) is a Singaporean drama produced and telecast on Mediacorp Channel 8. It stars Desmond Tan, Ya Hui, Denise Camillia Tan, Elvis Chin and Richie Koh.

== Main cast ==
- Desmond Tan as Zhou Zhiping 周志平 : Zhou created the hacker team "Zero".
  - 谢颖泽 as the younger version of Zhou
- Ya Hui as Liang Siyun
  - 吴委恩 as the younger Liang
- Denise Camillia Tan as Du Enzhe
- Richie Koh as Huang Xuezhong
- Guo Liang as Liang Wendao
- Adele Wong as Mrs Liang
- Bernard Tan as Wang Renhai
- Zen Chong as He Shaoguang
- Darren Lim as He Shaoqiang
- Zhai Siming as Huang Yiming
- Mei Xin as Joanna
- May Phua as Shi Minli
- Juin Teh as Qiao’er
