= Quan Yi Fong =

Taiwan-born Singaporean host and actress (born 1974)

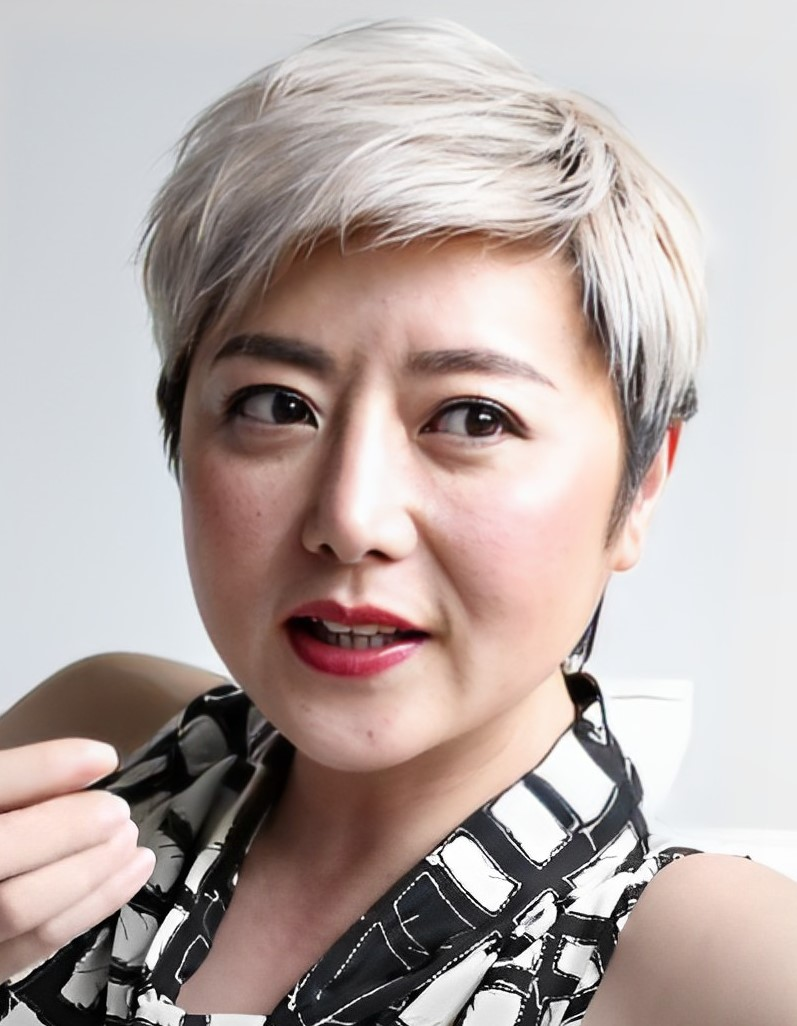
- Quan in September 2017
- Born: 1 March 1974 (age 52); Taiwan
- Other names: Quan Yifeng; Yifong Chuan
- Occupations: Host; actress
- Years active: 1991–present
- Spouse: Peter Yu (m. 1998; div. 2009)
- Children: Eleanor Lee
- Awards: Full list

Chinese name
- Traditional Chinese: 權怡鳳
- Simplified Chinese: 权怡凤
- Hanyu Pinyin: Quán Yí Fèng
- Wade–Giles: Ch'üan I Fêng
- Tongyong Pinyin: Cyuan Yi Fong
- Jyutping: Kyun4 Ji4 Fung6
- Hokkien POJ: Khoân Î-hōng
- Tâi-lô: Khuân Î-hōng

Quan Yi Fong (born 1 March 1974) is a Singaporean host and actress.

== Career ==
Born in Taiwan, Quan moved to Singapore in 1990 and joined the SBC in 1992. In 1996, she was fired by TCS over a fight at a bowling alley and for driving without a valid license.

Quan joined SPH MediaWorks in 2000. When SPH MediaWorks merged with MediaCorp, she was transferred to MediaCorp, marking her return to the company after almost 9 years.

In Asian Television Award 2008, she obtained the Best Entertainment Presenter. In Star Awards 2005 & Star Awards 2014, she won Best Variety Show Host. She won Best Info-ed Programme Show Host at the Star Awards 2015. She won Best Programme Host from 2017 to 2019. She was nominated a total of 12 times for Best Programme Host.

== Personal life ==
Quan married former MediaCorp actor Peter Yu in 1998 after meeting while filming the television series Happy Travel Agency. They have a daughter, Eleanor Lee, born on 12 October 1999. Quan and Yu divorced on 3 January 2009 and share custody of their daughter. Quan shared she has forgiven her ex-husband and they no longer have any animosity between them.

== Controversy ==
In 1996, Quan was fined S$1,000 after a fight with a bowling alley assistant.

In 2010, Quan was accused of abusing a taxi driver. It was alleged that she was angry that the taxi driver did not help with loading her luggage onto the taxi and throwing her forward while stopping sharply at a junction. She supposedly alighted, kicked the car door and then kicked the taxi driver in the groin. She subsequently locked herself in the taxi and messed the taxi up. She had hired Subhas Anandan to represent her after the incident. She was charged with two counts of mischief and one count of using criminal force.

On 29 December 2011, Quan Yi Feng was sentenced to 15 months' probation in court. Quan was charged with damaging a taxi meter, pulling out the receipt printer of a cab and spilling water on the receipt printer. Two other charges—of kicking the right passenger door of the taxi, and pushing and attempting to kick the 53-year-old taxi driver—were also taken into consideration.

She had to attend psychological therapy and counselling sessions as part of her probation.

In July 2013, Quan had a brush with the law once again when she knocked down a pedestrian at a crossing. Quan pleaded guilty to one count of inconsiderate driving under the Road Traffic Act and was fined S$800 and banned from driving for three months.

== Filmography ==
=== Television series ===
Year	Title	Role	Notes	Ref.
1996	Comedy Night 1996 搞笑行动 1996			
1996	Don't Worry Be Happy 敢敢做个开心人		Season 1	
1998	Office Affairs 哈比旅行社			
2001	Happy Family 元氏一家人			
2001	Wonderful Life – Fantasy 奇妙人生之幻想			
2002	Back to Basics 重进森林			
2002	Ad-War 完美把戏			
2003	OK No Problem! OK没问题			
2003	Tastefully Yours 味之道			
2004	Zero			
2005	Oh Mother 哎哟我的妈			
2010	The Illusionist 魔幻视界			

=== Film ===
Year	Title	Role	Notes	Ref.
1994	Love Dowry (爱情定金)	Min	Television film	
1995	Love Knows No Bounds (甜甜屋)	Xiu Hui	Television film	
1995	Pointed Triangle (杀之恋)	Shijia	Television film	
1997	12 Storeys	Lily		
1997	The Scoop (迷情专访)	Joey	Television film	
2005	Power of Love (甜蜜风暴)		Television film	
2009	The Wedding Game			
2010	In The Name of Love		Carlsberg Telemovie series episode 1	
2016	Young & Fabulous		Liu Meifeng	
2019	The Playbook (爱本)		Short film	
2024	Fat Hope			

=== Variety show hosting ===
- 1992-2000
  - River Hong Bao Show 环岛追追追能耐极限大挑战
  - President’s Star Charity 总统星光慈善
  - Pioneer Aisa KTV Contest
- 1993
  - Star Search 1993 才华横溢出新秀
- 1995
  - Star Search Final 1995才华横溢出新秀
- 2000-2004
  - Amazing Grace 有心仁事
  - Dream Challengers圆梦心计划
  - AHA! 拉票超人王
  - Food Train 食在必行
  - Ready Steady Go 全民出动抢鲜玩
  - Happy Rules开心就好
  - ‘Live’Unlimited 综艺无界限
  - The Next Big Thing 全民偶像新登场
  - Do Re Mi 发搜搜搜
  - Ultimate Tastebud 食在好吃
  - Mall & More 夺宝三响炮
  - Ready Steady Go 2 全民出动抢鲜玩2
- 2003-2004
  - Ren Ci Charity Show 2003-2004 仁心慈爱照万千
- 2005
  - Ren Ci Charity Show 2005 仁心慈爱照万千
  - Chingay Parade of Dreams 装艺大游行之奇思梦想
  - Lunar New Year Show 天鸡报喜贺新春
  - Condo & The City 寓望城市
  - Cenosis Beauty Quest 3 苗条淑女争风采之瘦身后
  - Superhost 超级主持人
  - Cenosis Beauty Quest 2 苗条淑女争风采之瘦身前
  - NKF Cancer Show 1 风雨同舟献真心
  - Project Superstar 绝对Superstar
  - What Women Want 2X 真女人
  - NKF Charity Show 1 群星照亮千万心之星光璀璨爱相随
  - NKF Charity Show 2 群星照亮千万心之星光荟萃展豪情
  - Shoot! 有话就说
  - Love Bites 缘来就是你
  - Life Scent 花花都市
- 2006
  - Lunar New Year Eve Special 2006 吉祥灵犬庆新春
  - Ren Ci Charity Show 2006 仁心慈爱照万千
  - Seeking The Right One 选好就结婚
  - THK Charity Show 一心一德为善乐
  - May Day Concert
  - Shoot2 有话就说
  - Starry Starry Night 2006 中新歌会-非常新加坡燃情之夜
  - What's Art 什么艺思?
  - Project Superstar 绝对Superstar
  - Star Chef 名厨玩味
- 2007
  - Giant Stars 2007 Giant 星光灿烂
  - SuperSavers 省省赢家赢新年
  - Lunar New Year Eve Special 2007 金猪贺岁庆肥年
  - Chingay Parade of Dreams 妆艺大#行之奇思梦想
  - Wonder Baby 无敌宝宝擂台赛
  - King of Thrift Smart省钱王
  - Numbers Game 数战速决
  - Ren Ci Charity Show 2007 仁心慈爱照万千
  - THK Charity Show 一心一德为善乐
  - The ABC's of Water 洁净所能水中乐
  - When Cupid Strikes Hello 有缘人
  - Maria is not at home Maria 今天不在家
  - Be A Giant Star - Society for Physically Disbled charity show 星光灿烂 - 真情无障爱 2007
  - Shoot III 有话就说III
  - Star Search 2007 才华横溢出新秀
  - Law by Law 赢了Law
  - Good Food Fun Cook 餐餐宝餐餐好
  - OSIM iGift uHealthy OSIM送礼更健康
  - 25 Star Awards 2007 - 25th Drama Anniversary show 红星大奖之戏剧情牵
  - Star Awards 2007 红星大奖 2007
- 2008
  - SPOP Hurray! S-POP万岁
  - Buzzing Cashier 抢摊大行动
  - Have A Giant Fun Time
  - King of Thrift 2 Smart省钱王2
  - Celebritea Break
  - Follow me to Glamour
  - Life Transformers 心晴大动员
- 2009
  - Lunar New Year Special Show 2009
  - Gotcha, Kids! 娃娃看世界
  - Celebritea Talk Show II
  - Buzzing Cashier 抢摊大行动
  - Housewive Pte Ltd 主妇的春天
  - Life Transformer 2 心晴大动员2
  - King of Thrift III Smart 省钱王3
  - King of Thrift Goes Overseas 省钱王出城记
  - Star Awards 2009
- 2010
  - Giant Fortune Festival 2010! 爱上Giant过肥年2010！
  - Lunar New Year Special Show 2010
  - Black Rose S1 爆料黑玫瑰
  - KFC Breakfast KFC 早餐大比拼
  - Thong Chai Charity 2010
  - Star Awards 2010
  - Life Navigator 从心开始
  - Star Search 2010
  - New Citybeat 2 城人新杂志2
  - Buzzing Cashier 2 抢摊大行动2
- 2011
  - Giant Fortune Festival 2011! 爱上Giant过肥年2011！
  - Power Duet K歌2击队
  - Show Me The Money 钱哪里有问题
  - Dietary Errors 饮食误区
  - Love On The Plate 名厨出走记 2 之重新出发
  - Star Awards 2011
- 2012
  - Star Reunion 那些年,我们一起看电视
  - Simply Exquisite 食分高下
  - Love In Progress 爱. 进行中
  - I Love I like i不释手
- 2013
  - Giant Fortune Festival 2013! 爱上Giant过肥年2013！
  - Laughing Out Loud 笑笑没烦恼
  - Shoot It! 哪里出问题?
  - Star Awards 2013
  - Finding U 寻U先锋
  - Stir it Up! 电视拌饭
  - Foodie Dash 美食大赢家3
  - Are You Up For It? 大明星你行吗?
  - Let’s Cook 全民新煮艺
- 2014
  - Giant Fortune Festival 2014! 爱上Giant过肥年2014！
  - Chinese New Year Eve Show 2014 骏马奔腾喜迎春 2014
  - Finding 8 先锋争8战
  - Black Rose S2 爆料黑玫瑰
  - Shoot It! 2 哪里出问题? 2 之食在有问题
  - Where to Stay? 到底住哪里？
  - Round and Round We Go 公子爱挑战
  - What Your School Doesn't Teach You 学校没教的事
  - Ladies Nite S3 女人聚乐部
  - Celebrity Bazaar 星货我来卖
  - Star Awards 20
- 2015
  - Giant Fortune Festival 2015! 爱上Giant过肥年2015！
  - Neighbourhood Chef 2 邻里厨王2
  - Chinggay 2015 妆艺大游行2015
  - SPD Charity Show 2015 真情无障爱 2015
  - Star Awards 2015
  - Leave It All To Me 今天我代班
  - Home Away From Home 异乡。驿客
  - The Courts Show 家家有COURTS赢奖乐
  - Toggle Talk Toggle星客驾到
  - Celeb's Curated Collections 名人。心货
- 2016
  - Giant Fortune Festival 2016! 爱上Giant过肥年2016！
  - Lion Charity Show 2016 情牵白首爱不息
  - The 4 Chefs 四大名厨
  - Mars VS Venus II 金星火星大不同 II
  - Markets in Asia 游市集
  - Hearts and Hugs 爱心72小时
  - Closet Secrets 衣橱密语
  - Your Thoughts Please 好说快说一起说
- 2017
  - Giant Fortune Festival 2017! 爱上Giant过肥年2017！
  - Hearts and Hugs 爱心72小时
  - Unique Lodging 不一样的旅店
  - Take A Break! 说走就走 短假游
  - Chinese New Year Eve Show 2017 咕鸡咕鸡庆丰年 2017
  - SPD Charity Show 2017 真情无障爱 2017
  - Fixer 线人
  - My Star Guide 12 我的明星是导游 12
  - Hear My Thoughts 混口饭吃而已
- 2018
  - Thrift Hunters 我赚到了
  - Play House 室内新玩家
  - Voices 听我说
  - Fixer 2 线人2
  - Star Awards 2018
  - Taste of Nanyang 翻乡找味
  - SPOP Sing! SPOP 听我唱!
- 2019
  - Old Taste Detective 古早味侦探
  - Beyond the Cameras 我是媒体人
  - Fixer 3 线人3
  - My Star Guide 14 我的明星是导游 14
  - Lunar New Year's Eve Special 2019
  - SPD Charity Show 2019 真情无障爱 2019
  - The Destined One 众里寻一
  - Star Awards 2019
- 2020
  - Hear U Out 权听你说
  - YiFong & Eleanor's Kitchen 怡凤和妹妹的厨房
- 2021
  - Star Awards 2021
  - Hear U Out S2 权听你说2
- 2022
  - Hear U Out S3 权听你说3
- 2023
  - Hear U Out S4 权听你说4

== Awards and nominations ==
Year	Organisation	Award	Nominated work	Result	Ref
2005	Star Awards	Best Variety Show Host	Love Bites	Won	
2005	Star Awards	Top 10 Most Popular Female Artistes	—N/a	Won	
2006	Star Awards	Best Variety Show Host	What's Art	Nominated	
2006	Star Awards	Top 10 Most Popular Female Artistes	—N/a	Won	
2007	Star Awards	Best Variety Show Host	King of Thrift	Nominated	
2007	Star Awards	Top 10 Most Popular Female Artistes	—N/a	Won	
2008	Asian Television Awards	Best Entertainment Presenter	Buzzing Cashier	Won	
2008	Star Awards	Top 10 Most Popular Female Artistes	—N/a	Won	
2009	Star Awards	Best Variety Show Host	Life Transformers	Nominated	
2009	Star Awards	Top 10 Most Popular Female Artistes	—N/a	Won	
2010	Star Awards	Best Variety Show Host	Buzzing Cashier 2	Nominated	
2010	Star Awards	Top 10 Most Popular Female Artistes	—N/a	Won	
2011	Star Awards	Favourite Female Character		Nominated	
2011	Star Awards	Favourite Onscreen Partner (Variety)	—N/a	Won	
2011	Star Awards	Top 10 Most Popular Female Artistes	—N/a	Won	
2013	Star Awards	Top 10 Most Popular Female Artistes	—N/a	Won	
2014	Star Awards	Best Variety Show Host	Finding U	Won	
2014	Star Awards	Top 10 Most Popular Female Artistes	—N/a	Won	
2015	Star Awards	Best Variety Show Host	Black Rose 2	Nominated	
2015	Star Awards	Best Info-Ed Programme Host	Where To Stay	Won	
2015	Star Awards	Top 10 Most Popular Female Artistes	—N/a	Won	
2016	Star Awards	Best Programme Host	Celeb's Curated Collections	Nominated	
2016	Star Awards	Top 10 Most Popular Female Artistes	—N/a	Won	
2017	Asian Television Awards	Best Programme Host	Markets in Asia	Nominated	
2017	Star Awards	Best Programme Host	Markets in Asia	Won	
2017	Star Awards	All-Time Favourite Artiste	—N/a	Won	
2018	Asian Academy Creative Awards	Best Entertainment Presenter/Host	Unique Lodging	Won	
2018	Star Awards	Best Programme Host	Unique Lodging	Won	
2019	Star Awards	Best Programme Host	Fixer 2	Won	
2021	Star Awards	Best Programme Host	Hear U Out	Won	
2021	Star Awards	Best Programme Host	Yi Fong & Eleanor's Kitchen	Nominated	
2022	Star Awards	Best Programme Host	Hear U Out S2	Won	
2022	Star Awards	Perfect Combo (with Guo Liang)	—N/a	Nominated	
2023	Star Awards	Best Programme Host	Hear U Out S3	Nominated	
2024	Star Awards	Best Programme Host	Hear U Out S4	Won	
