= Whatever Will Be, Will Be (TV series) =

2023 Singaporean television series

- Promotional poster
- Traditional Chinese: 天公疼憨人
- Simplified Chinese: 天公疼憨人
- Literal meaning: "Heaven dotes on the simple-minded"
- Hanyu Pinyin: Tiāngōng téng hānrén
- Genre: Drama
- Screenplay by: Liu Qingpeng
- Story by: Liu Qingpeng
- Directed by: Gao Shuyi
- Starring: Chen Hanwei; Richie Koh; Yvonne Lim; Kym Ng; Zhu Houren; Richard Low; Hong Huifang
- Opening theme: 1) Hokkien - "My Dream" by Desmond Ng; 2) Mandarin - "The Ordinary Me" by Desmond Ng
- Country of origin: Singapore
- Original language: Mixed Chinese varieties (primarily Singaporean Hokkien)
- No. of seasons: 1
- No. of episodes: 20

Production
- Executive producer: Ye Peijuan
- Cinematography: Peng Jinchen
- Editor: Wu Xuexian
- Running time: 45 minutes
- Production company: Mediacorp

Original release
- Network: Channel 8
- Release: 21 July 2023 – 2023

Whatever Will Be, Will Be (Chinese: 天公疼憨人) is a 2023 Singaporean non-Mandarin Chinese drama series starring Chen Hanwei, Richie Koh, Yvonne Lim, Kym Ng, Zhu Houren, Richard Low and Hong Huifang. The series is the fourth collaboration between the Ministry of Communications and Information (MCI) and Mediacorp. It premiered on 21 July 2023 and airs every Friday at 11.30am on Channel 8.

== Cast ==
=== Main and supporting ===
- Chen Hanwei as Liu Bishan
- Kym Ng as Zheng Huiyao
- Yvonne Lim as Liu Bizhen
- Richie Koh as Liu Birang
- Zhu Houren as Liu Dafu
- Andie Chen as Lin Guangjian
- Seow Sin Nee as Zhang Meiqi
- Hong Huifang as Su Fangfang
- Richard Low as Hu Nanshan
- Liu Lingling as Hao Yingjin
- Ke Le as Zeng Xiaoxiao

=== Guest appearances ===
- Darren Lim as Ah Wen
- Mark Lee as Du Zhenping
- Chen Tianwen as Homeowner
- Jaspers Lai as Ray
- Kenneth Kong as Shop manager
- Bukoh Mary as Manager Chen
- Qiu Shengyang as Tutor Zhang Guosheng
- Chen Shucheng as Tissue Man
- Bryan Wong as Manager Ho
- Marcus Chin as Lei Wang
- Zhu Xiufeng as Feng Lian
- Dennis Chew as Zheng Cheng
- Pierre Png as Policeman

== Production ==
Richard Low and Lin Ruping served as non-Mandarin Chinese coaches and consultants for Whatever Will Be, Will Be. The series marked getai host and singer Lee Pei Fen's debut acting role on screen in her 30-year showbiz career.

Filming wrapped in early May 2023.

== Accolades ==
Organisation	Year	Category	Nominees	Result	Ref
Star Awards	2024	Best Supporting Actor	Andie Chen	Nominated	
Star Awards	2024	Best Actor	Chen Han Wei	Nominated	
