= Happy Can Already! 4 =

- Season 4
- Starring: Jack Neo; Mark Lee; Henry Thia; Wang Lei; Jaspers Lai
- No. of episodes: 10

Release
- Original network: Mediacorp Channel 8
- Original release: 26 November – 28 December 2018

Season chronology
- ← Previous; Happy Can Already! 3

Happy Can Already! 4 (Chinese: 欢喜就好4) is a Singapore dialect variety series which is telecast on Singapore's free-to-air channel, Mediacorp Channel 8 starring Jack Neo, Mark Lee, Henry Thia, Wang Lei, and Jaspers Lai. It is broadcast every Friday from 11.30am to 12.30pm. Jack Neo will reprise Liang Popo for the first time after 24 years.

== Cast ==
Cast	Role	Description	Episodes Appeared
Jack Neo	Liang Po Po	Liang Chunjiao	1-10
Mark Lee	Manager		1
Mark Lee	HR Manager		4
Mark Lee	Supervisor	Zhiming	5
Mark Lee	Emperor		6
Mark Lee	School Staff		7
Mark Lee	Security Manager		8
Mark Lee	Hong Kong Director		10
Henry Thia	Miss Lim		1–4, 8, 10
Henry Thia	Bus Driver		5
Henry Thia	Gong Gong		6
Henry Thia	Student		7
Henry Thia	Recruit Chi Kok		9
Marcus Chin	Doctor		2-3
Marcus Chin	Boss		4
Marcus Chin	Passenger		5
Marcus Chin	Robber		8
Marcus Chin	Sergeant		9
Marcus Chin	Supervisor		10
Wang Lei	Cantonese Granny		3–4, 8
Wang Lei	Consort	Ice Chendol Cantonese Grandmother	6
Wang Lei	Student		7
Jaspers Lai	General	Fucha Fuzhi	6
Jaspers Lai	Student		7
Jaspers Lai	Robber		8
Jaspers Lai	Recruit		9
Jaspers Lai	Assistant Director		10
Ho Ailing	Customer		1
Ho Ailing	Nurse Manager		2-3
Ho Ailing	Staff		4
Ho Ailing	Passenger		5
Ho Ailing	Momo		6
Ho Ailing	Student		7
Ho Ailing	Bodyguard		8
Ho Ailing	Recruit		9
Ho Ailing	Calefare		10
Chua Lee Lian	Patient		2
Chua Lee Lian	Nurse		3
Chua Lee Lian	Passenger		5
Chua Lee Lian	Empress		6
Chua Lee Lian	Student		7
Michelle Tay	Customer		1
Michelle Tay	Passenger		5
Michelle Tay	Consort	Yao Guifei	6
Michelle Tay	Student		7
Michelle Tay	Princess		8
Michelle Tay	Recruit		9
Michelle Tay	Calefare		10
Leon Lim	Customer		1
Leon Lim	Passenger		5
Leon Lim	Royal Guard		6
Leon Lim	Student		7
Leon Lim	Bodyguard		8
Leon Lim	Cameraman		10
Im Komei	Customer		1
Im Komei	Consort		6
Im Komei	Student		7
Im Komei	Female Lead		10
Apple Chan	Intern Nurse		2
Isaac Chua	Patient		2
Isaac Chua	Passenger		5
Noah Yap	Recruit		9
Chase Tan	Male Lead		10

== Happy Make-a-guess ==
Episode no.	Team Yellow		Team Green		Score	Result
1	Michelle Tay (leader)	Kym Ng	Ho Ailing (leader)	Ben Yeo	3-2	Team Yellow Wins; Team Green drinks their own penalty drink
2	Michelle Tay (leader)	Desmond Ng	Ho Ailing (leader)	Aileen Tan	2-3	Team Green Wins; Michelle Tay gets water-bombed
3	Michelle Tay (leader)	Ryan Lian	Ho Ailing (leader)	Zhu Houren	3-2	Team Yellow Wins; Team Green eats spicy prawn crackers made by Team Yellow
4	Michelle Tay (leader)	Yap Hui Xin	Ho Ailing (leader)	Xie Wen	2-3	Team Green Wins; Michelle Tay gets water-bombed
5	Michelle Tay (leader)	Angela Ang	Ho Ailing (leader)	Chen Tianwen	2-3	Team Green Wins; Team Yellow draws lipstick on each other blindfolded
6	Michelle Tay (leader)	Lerine Yeo	Ho Ailing (leader)	Chase Tan	1-2	Team Green Wins; Team Yellow draws lipstick on each other blindfolded
7	Michelle Tay (leader)	Tay Yin Yin	Ho Ailing (leader)	Rayson Tan	2-3	Team Green Wins; Tay Yin Yin gets water-bombed
8	Michelle Tay (leader)	Benjamin Josiah Tan	Ho Ailing (leader)	Kelvin Soon	2-3	Team Green Wins; Michelle Tay gets flour-bombed
9	Michelle Tay (leader)	Hong Huifang	Ho Ailing (leader)	Zhu Li Li	4-1	Team Yellow Wins; Team Green draws lipstick on each other blindfolded
10	Michelle Tay (leader)	Richard Low	Ho Ailing (leader)	Cola Lau	3-1	Team Yellow Wins; Team Green gets water-bombed

== Music ==
Song title	Song type	Lyrics	Composer	Performer	Producer
欢喜就好啦	Opening theme song	Jack Neo	邓碧源	Jack Neo	麦如丽

== Trivia ==
- On 15 October 2018, a media conference was held at Swatow Seafood Restaurant Toa Payoh with artistes Jack Neo, Marcus Chin, Henry Thia, Wang Lei, and Ho Ailing.

== See also ==
- Happy Can Already!
- Happy Can Already! 2
- Happy Can Already! 3
- List of variety and infotainment programmes broadcast by MediaCorp Channel 8
