= Eat Already? 3 =

- Traditional Chinese: 食飽未？3
- Simplified Chinese: 吃饱没？3
- Hokkien POJ: Chia̍h-pá-bōe? Saⁿ
- Genre: Family; Sitcom; Pioneer Generation
- Written by: Tytan Chang; Tiffany Tan
- Directed by: Kelvin Tong 唐永健
- Starring: Chen Shucheng; Hong Huifang; Felicia Chin; Nick Shen; Rayson Tan; Lin Meijiao; Zheng Geping; Marcus Chin; Sora Ma
- Opening theme: 吃饱没? by Dream FZ
- Ending theme: Segments of Next Episode
- Country of origin: Singapore
- Original language: Mixed Dialogue
- No. of episodes: 10 (excluding 3 specials)

Production
- Producers: Theresa Teng 丁美连 邱贞仪
- Running time: approx. 23 minutes

Original release
- Network: Mediacorp Channel 8
- Release: 18 August – 27 October 2017

Related
- Happy Can Already! 2; Happy Can Already! 3; Eat Already? (2016) Eat Already? 2 (2017) Eat Already? 4 (2018)

Eat Already? 3 (Chinese: 吃饱没? 3) is a Singaporean Hokkien-language drama series which is telecast on Singapore's free-to-air channel, Mediacorp Channel 8. It stars Chen Shucheng, Hong Huifang, Felicia Chin, Nick Shen, Rayson Tan, Lin Meijiao, Zheng Geping, Marcus Chin & Sora Ma as the casts.

== Plot ==
Eat Already? 3 tells the story of everyday Singaporeans, no matter their age and level of experience, adapting and adjusting themselves to keep up with technology.

== Cast ==
- Chen Shucheng as Uncle Yuan
- Hong Huifang as Auntie Yuan
- Hsu Chiung Fang as Empress Dowager Wang
- Rayson Tan as Towkay Wang
- Lin Meijiao as Towkay Niang
- Nick Shen as Ken
- Zheng Geping as Zeng Gaoli/ Zeng Gaowei
- Sora Ma as Ma Xiaoling
- Felicia Chin as Qiqi
- Marcus Chin as Ah Soon
- Rahimah Rahim as Fatimah
- Ning Cai as Ms Ooi
- Yan Bingliang as Jin Nanshan

== Development ==
The series is a collaboration between the Ministry of Communications and Information (MCI) and Mediacorp, in partnership with Boku Films and Tribal Worldwide.

== Music ==
Song Title	Song Type	Lyrics	Composer	Performer(s)	Producer
Eat Already? 吃饱没?	Opening & Ending theme-song	Marcus Chin	Jim Lim	Ric Liu; Cavin Soh; Jim Lim	Jim Lim

== Trivia ==
- On 1 August 2017, a promotional roadshow was held at Central Stage @ Ang Mo Kio Town Centre with artistes Felicia Chin, Chen Shucheng, Lin Meijiao, Marcus Chin, Rayson Tan, Zheng Geping, Nick Shen and Zheng Wanling and special guests Liu Lingling, Ms Mole and CKay.
- This will be Marcus Chin's third season after Eat Already? & Eat Already? 2.
- A special, Making of Eat Already? 3, aired on 11 August 2017.
- Two special episodes, The Best Of Eat Already? 3, will be aired on 27 October 2017 and 2 November 2017 from 12 p.m. to 12.30 p.m.
