= Star Awards for Top 10 Most Popular Male Artistes =

Singaporean media award

- Awarded for: Most Popular Male Artistes
- Country: Singapore
- Presented by: Mediacorp
- First award: February 26, 1994; 32 years ago
- Most recent winners: Shaun Chen; Marcus Chin; Jeff Goh; Guo Liang; Richie Koh; Ayden Sng; Benjamin Tan; Desmond Tan; Nick Teo; Xu Bin (2026)

Highlights
- Most awards: Shaun Chen (8)
- Most nominations: Chen Shucheng (25)

The Star Awards for Top 10 Most Popular Male Artistes is an award presented annually at the Star Awards since its inception in 1994.

== History ==
Terence Cao, Chew Chor Meng, Li Nanxing, Sean Say, and Desmond Sim were the five male recipients of the inaugural 10 Most Popular Artistes award. The winners were determined by a majority vote from the public via telephone and SMS text voting.

In 1994 and 1995, the Most Popular Actor award was also awarded to the male artiste who topped the votes. Li and Chen Hanwei were the recipients of this award in 1994 and 1995 respectively.

Since 1997, the number of recipients for each category was expanded to ten and the award was renamed as Top 10 Most Popular Male Artistes.

In 2004, the All-Time Favourite Artiste was introduced. Artistes who had received ten prior Star Awards for Top 10 Most Popular Male / Female Artistes were automatically conferred the title, and were removed from the nomination pool permanently. A total of 17 male artistes have since achieved this status and are no longer eligible to be nominated.

In 2023, the Most Popular Rising Stars award was introduced for artistes who have been in the entertainment industry for five years or less. A win in this category will also count towards the overall Top 10 tally.

== Eligibility ==
Initially, only full-time Mediacorp actors were eligible to be nominated. In 1997, a rule change allowed artistes from the variety sector to contest for the award.

In 2018, the rules were changed again to allow contracted, project-based and/or non-Mediacorp artistes to be nominated.

== Recipients ==
Since its inception, the award saw a total of 176 male artistes being nominated, of which 59 artistes had won at least one award, and 17 artistes had been conferred the All-Time Favourite Artiste. Shaun Chen, Marcus Chin, Jeff Goh, Guo Liang, Richie Koh, Ayden Sng, Benjamin Tan, Desmond Tan, Nick Teo and Xu Bin are the most recent winners in the Top 10 Most Popular Male Artistes category.

Tyler Ten and Zhang Zetong are the most recent winners in the Most Popular Rising Stars category.

Colour key
Artiste received or expected to receive the All-Time Favourite Artiste award
Artiste won the Top 10 Most Popular Male Artistes award
Artiste won the Most Popular Rising Stars award
Artiste was nominated for the Top 10 Most Popular Male Artistes award
Artiste was nominated for the Most Popular Rising Stars award
Artiste was not nominated for the award

Artiste	Year																															Wins	Noms
Artiste	1994	1995	1996	1997	1998	1999	2000	2001	2002	2003	2004	2005	2006	2007	2009	2010	2011	2012	2013	2014	2015	2016	2017	2018	2019	2021	2022	2023	2024	2025	2026	Wins	Noms
Chew Chor Meng	1	2	3	4	5	6	7	8	9	10	✔																					10	10
Li Nanxing	1	2	3	4	5	6	7	8	9	10	✔																					10	10
Xie Shaoguang		1	2	3	4	5	6	7	8	9	10	✔																				10	10
Christopher Lee				1	2	N	3	N	4	5	6	7	8	9	10	✔																10	12
Mark Lee					1	2	N	3	4	5	6	7	8	9	10	✔																10	11
Tay Ping Hui						N	1	2	N	3	4	5	6	7	8	9	10	✔														10	12
Chen Hanwei		1	2				3	4	N	N	N	5	N	N	6	7	8	9	10	✔												10	15
Bryan Wong					1	2						3	4	5	6	7	8	9	10	✔												10	10
Qi Yuwu											1	2	3	4	5	6	7	8	N	9	10	✔										10	11
Elvin Ng													1	2	3	4	5	6	7	8	9	10	✔									10	10
Dasmond Koh							1		2	3	4	N	N	5		N	N	6	7		8			9	10	✔						10	14
Dennis Chew									N	N	N	N	N			1	2	3	4	5	N	6	7	8	9	10	✔					10	16
Zheng Geping															1	2	3	4	5	6	N	7		8	9	10	✔					10	11
Pornsak															1	N	2	N	3	4	5	N	6	7	8	9	N		10	✔		10	14
Romeo Tan																			N	1	2	N	3	4	5	6	7	8	9	10	✔	10	12
Guo Liang				1	2	3						N	N	N	N	4	N	N	N	N	N	N	N	5	N	6	7	8	N	9	10	10	23
Desmond Tan																				1	N		2	3	4	5	6	7	8	9	10	10	11
Shaun Chen														N		N	N				1	N	N	2	3	4	5	6	7		8	8	13
Xu Bin																				1	2	3	N			N	4	5		6	7	7	9
Zhang Yaodong														1	N	2	3	4				5	N		N	N	N	N	6	N		6	13
Lee Teng																			1	2	3	4	5	N	N		6	N	N	N	N	6	12
Marcus Chin											N	N	N	N	N						N			N	N	1	2	3	4	5	6	6	14
Pierre Png														N	N	N	N	1	N	N	N	N	N	2	3	4	5	N		N		5	16
Thomas Ong		1	2			3													N		N	N	N	4							N	4	9
Jeff Goh																												1	2	3	4	4	4
Ayden Sng																												1	2	3	4	4	4
Ben Yeo																	N	1					2				3	N	N	N	N	3	8
Zhang Zhenxuan																				1		2	3	N								3	4
Shane Pow																					1	2	3			N		N	N	N	N	3	8
Jeremy Chan																												1	2	3	N	3	4
Richie Koh																												1	N	2	3	3	4
Benjamin Tan																												N	1	2	3	3	4
Zhang Ze Tong																												N	1	2	3	3	4
Ian Fang																				N	1		2			N			N			2	5
Desmond Ng																							1			N		2	N	N	N	2	6
Chen Shucheng				N			N	N	N	N	N	N	N		N	N	N	N	N	N	N	N	N	N	1	2	N	N	N	N	N	2	25
Brandon Wong																											1	2	N	N	N	2	5
Tyler Ten																												N	N	1	2	2	4
Zhu Houren				N	N	N					N				N	N	N	N	N	N	N	N	N	N	1	N	N	N	N		N	1	20
James Seah																										N		N	1	N	N	1	5
Zong Zijie																										N		N	N	1		1	4
Nick Teo																												N	N	N	1	1	4
Artistes who have not won in the past 10 years
Terence Cao	1	N	N	N	2	3	4	5	N	N	6	7	N	N		N	N	N	N		N		N		N							7	21
Edmund Chen			N	N				1	2	3	4	5	6	7																		7	9
Jack Neo					1	2	3	4	5	6														N								6	7
Vincent Ng						N	1	2	N	N	3	4	5																			5	8
Gurmit Singh									1	2	N	3	4	5	N	N	N	N		N												5	11
James Lye				1		2																										2	2
Henry Thia					1	N	N	N			N	N		N	2											N						2	9
Dai Xiangyu																1	N	N	2	N												2	5
Huang Wenyong				N	N	N	N	N	N	N	N	N	N	N	N	N	1	N	2													2	16
Sean Say	1	N																														1	2
Desmond Sim	1																															1	1
Peter Yu		N	N	1	N																											1	4
Rayson Tan				1	N		N	N		N								N							N	N	N	N	N			1	11
Chen Tianwen				1	N		N	N	N													N	N			N	N	N				1	10
Mak Ho Wai				1	N		N	N																								1	4
Billy Wang									1	N																						1	2
Moses Lim								N	N	N	1	N																				1	5
Kelvin Tan													1																			1	1
Jeffrey Xu																						1	N			N		N	N	N	N	1	7
Aloysius Pang																						1		N								1	2
Richard Low				N	N		N		N	N	N				N		N	N	N	N					N	N	N	N	N	N	N	0	18
Yao Wenlong		N	N	N	N														N				N		N	N	N	N	N	N	N	0	13
Darren Lim					N	N																				N	N	N	N	N	N	0	8
Andie Chen																							N	N	N				N	N	N	0	6
Cavin Soh																							N					N	N	N	N	0	5
Chua En Lai																						N			N		N		N			0	4
Joel Choo																										N		N		N	N	0	4
Feng Jian Bin																												N	N	N	N	0	4
Kenneth Kong																												N	N	N	N	0	4
Pan Jia Biao																												N	N	N	N	0	4
Qiu Sheng Yang																												N	N	N	N	0	4
Wallace Ang																												N	N	N	N	0	4
Zhai Siming																												N	N	N	N	0	4
Zhong Kun Hua																												N	N	N	N	0	4
Lyu Linxuan																												N	N	N	N	0	4
Damien Teo																												N	N	N	N	0	4
Das DD																												N	N	N	N	0	4
Herman Keh																												N	N	N	N	0	4
Lim Pin Juen																												N	N	N	N	0	4
Zhu Zeliang																												N	N	N	N	0	4
Edwin Goh																				N						N		N				0	3
Wang Yuqing																												N	N		N	0	3
Shawn Thia																												N	N		N	0	3
Brian Ng																													N	N	N	0	3
Joe Tsoi																													N	N	N	0	3
Kevin Chua																													N	N	N	0	3
Tan Ting Fong																													N	N	N	0	3
Bernard Tan				N																										N		0	2
Danny Yeo							N																					N				0	2
Chen Xi																										N		N				0	2
Yang Shibin																												N			N	0	2
Ivan Lo																												N			N	0	2
Eric Lay																													N	N		0	2
Vincent Lim																													N	N		0	2
Soo Wee Seng																													N	N		0	2
Yan Wei Xiao Er																													N	N		0	2
Billy Seow																													N	N		0	2
Jian Ruyi																													N		N	0	2
Yang Yan																													N		N	0	2
Chef Melvyn																														N	N	0	2
Benzo Zhong																														N	N	0	2
Raynold Tan																														N	N	0	2
Yong Jack Hao																														N	N	0	2
Ha Yu																								N								0	1
Wang Weiliang																								N								0	1
Joshua Tan																										N						0	1
Zhang Wei																										N						0	1
Jarrell Huang																												N				0	1
Tang Shao Wei																												N				0	1
Charlie Goh																													N			0	1
Kim Jae Hoon																													N			0	1
Alfred Sun																													N			0	1
Kyle Chan																													N			0	1
David Loo																													N			0	1
Richard Ter																													N			0	1
Hank Wang																													N			0	1
Jansen Wang																													N			0	1
Bunz Bao																														N		0	1
Elvis Chin																														N		0	1
Zen Chong																														N		0	1
Gary Gan																														N		0	1
Jason Godfrey																														N		0	1
Henry Heng																														N		0	1
Huang Shi Nan																														N		0	1
Hugo Ng																														N		0	1
Rao Zi Jie																														N		0	1
Aden Tan																														N		0	1
Alan Tan																														N		0	1
Chase Tan																														N		0	1
Teddy Tang																														N		0	1
Teo Boon Seong																														N		0	1
James Wen																														N		0	1
Leon Eng																														N		0	1
Hang Qian Chou																														N		0	1
Max Ma																														N		0	1
Colin Qi																														N		0	1
Kevin Tan																														N		0	1
Andrew Lua																															N	0	1
Cansen Goh																															N	0	1
Chef James																															N	0	1
Danny Lee																															N	0	1
Darius Tan																															N	0	1
Gavin Teo																															N	0	1
Jared Soh																															N	0	1
Jaspers Lai																															N	0	1
Johnny Ng																															N	0	1
Kenji Sawahii																															N	0	1
Leon Lee																															N	0	1
Roy Li																															N	0	1
Louis Wu																															N	0	1
Thomas K																															N	0	1
Yuan Teng																															N	0	1
Cai Cheng Jun																															N	0	1
Niklaus Chia																															N	0	1
Clement Yeo																															N	0	1
Jona Chung																															N	0	1
Marcus Sim																															N	0	1
Tan Zi Sheng																															N	0	1
Tim Law																															N	0	1
Zhin Sadali																															N	0	1
Artistes who have not been nominated in the past 10 years
Adrian Pang												N	N	N	N																	0	4
Huang Yiliang				N				N			N																					0	3
Huang Bingjie						N	N																									0	2
Jeff Wang												N		N																		0	2
Chunyu Shanshan		N																														0	1
Ix Shen			N																													0	1
Ang Puay Heng				N																												0	1
Jason Oh					N																											0	1
Jerry Chang						N																										0	1
Kenneth Tsang						N																										0	1
Nick Shen								N																								0	1
Julian Hee													N																			0	1
Joshua Ang																N																0	1
Justin Ang																				N												0	1

== Award records ==
Record	Artiste	Count	Remarks
Won ten consecutive times since first nomination	Chew Chor Meng	4 artistes	1994, 1995, 1996, 1997, 1998, 1999, 2000, 2001, 2002, 2003
Won ten consecutive times since first nomination	Li Nanxing	4 artistes	1994, 1995, 1996, 1997, 1998, 1999, 2000, 2001, 2002, 2003
Won ten consecutive times since first nomination	Xie Shaoguang	4 artistes	1995, 1996, 1997, 1998, 1999, 2000, 2001, 2002, 2003, 2004
Won ten consecutive times since first nomination	Elvin Ng	4 artistes	2006, 2007, 2009, 2010, 2011, 2012, 2013, 2014, 2015, 2016
Most wins without All-Time Favourite Artiste award (Only incld. artists who have won in the past 10 years)	Shaun Chen	8 wins	2015, 2018, 2019, 2021, 2022, 2023, 2024, 2026
Most consecutive wins without All-Time Favourite Artiste award (Only incld. artists who have won in the past 10 years)	Shaun Chen	6 wins	2018, 2019, 2021, 2022, 2023, 2024
Most consecutive wins without All-Time Favourite Artiste award (Only incld. artists who have won in the past 10 years)	Marcus Chin	6 wins	2021, 2022, 2023, 2024, 2025, 2026
Longest gap between wins	Thomas Ong	19 years	1999—2018
Most nominations with All-Time Favourite Artiste award	Guo Liang	23 nominations	1997, 1998, 1999, 2005, 2006, 2007, 2009, 2010, 2011, 2012, 2013, 2014, 2015, 2016, 2017, 2018, 2019, 2021, 2022, 2023, 2024, 2025, 2026
Most nominations without All-Time Favourite Artiste award	Chen Shucheng	25 nominations	1997, 2000, 2001, 2002, 2003, 2004, 2005, 2006, 2009, 2010, 2011, 2012, 2013, 2014, 2015, 2016, 2017, 2018, 2019, 2021, 2022, 2023, 2024, 2025, 2026
Most consecutive nominations with All-Time Favourite Artiste award	Guo Liang	20 nominations	2005, 2006, 2007, 2009, 2010, 2011, 2012, 2013, 2014, 2015, 2016, 2017, 2018, 2019, 2021, 2022, 2023, 2024, 2025, 2026
Most consecutive nominations without All-Time Favourite Artiste award	Chen Shucheng	17 nominations	2009, 2010, 2011, 2012, 2013, 2014, 2015, 2016, 2017, 2018, 2019, 2021, 2022, 2023, 2024, 2025, 2026
Most nominations before first award	Chen Shucheng	18 nominations	Won first award (19th nomination) in 2019
Most nominations without a win	Richard Low	18 nominations	1997, 1998, 2000, 2002, 2003, 2004, 2009, 2011, 2012, 2013, 2014, 2019, 2021, 2022, 2023, 2024, 2025, 2026
Longest gap between nominations	Bernard Tan	28 years	1997—2025
Won Best Newcomer and Top 10 Most Popular Male Artistes or Most Popular Rising Stars in the same year	James Lye	3 artistes	1997
Won Best Newcomer and Top 10 Most Popular Male Artistes or Most Popular Rising Stars in the same year	Dasmond Koh	3 artistes	2000
Won Best Newcomer and Top 10 Most Popular Male Artistes or Most Popular Rising Stars in the same year	Kelvin Tan	3 artistes	2006
