= Eat Already? 2 =

- Traditional Chinese: 食飽未？2
- Simplified Chinese: 吃饱没？2
- Hokkien POJ: Chia̍h-pá-bōe? Lī
- Genre: Family; Sitcom; Pioneer Generation
- Written by: Tytan Chang; Josiah Ng
- Directed by: Royston Tan
- Starring: Marcus Chin; Aileen Tan; Liu Lingling; Lee Bao'en; Chen Shucheng; Hong Huifang
- Opening theme: You Light My Way (指引) by Kit Chan
- Ending theme: Segments of Next Episode
- Country of origin: Singapore
- Original languages: Mixed Dialogue (Singaporean Hokkien and Cantonese)
- No. of episodes: 11

Production
- Producers: Theresa Teng 丁美莲 邱贞仪
- Running time: approx. 23 minutes

Original release
- Network: Mediacorp Channel 8
- Release: 24 February – 5 May 2017

Related
- Happy Can Already!; Happy Can Already! 2; Eat Already? (2016) Eat Already? 3 (2017) Eat Already? 4 (2018)

Eat Already? 2 (Chinese: 吃饱没？2) is a Singaporean Cantonese- and Hokkien-language drama series which is telecast on Singapore's free-to-air channel, Mediacorp Channel 8. It stars Marcus Chin, Aileen Tan, Liu Lingling, Lee Bao'en, Chen Shucheng, Hong Huifang as the casts of the second installment.

== Plot ==
The series depicts the lives of dessert stall owner Ah Soon and his wife, who struggle to keep their business afloat as a new business competitor moves into the coffee shop. At home, their daughter Pei Shi aspires to be a singer despite their objections. Family tension runs high as Ah Soon's sister-in-law, Kym, moves in with them and supports Pei Shi's singing aspirations.

As the Soons grapple with their problems, their community also faces its own challenges. How will they support one another through life's ups and downs, and what will they learn from their experiences?

== Cast ==
- Marcus Chin as Ah Soon
- Aileen Tan as Auntie Soon
- Ian Fang as Ah Huat
- Lee Bao'en as Peishi
- Liu Lingling as Kym
- Chen Shucheng as Uncle Yuan
- Hong Huifang as Auntie Yuan
- Zhang Yaodong as Dehua
- Aaron Tan as French Loaf
- Zhu Xiufeng as Auntie Wang
- Priscelia Chan as Sally
- Li Yinzhu as Auntie Niu
- Wang Lei as Bird King
- Wang Yuqing as Jimmy
- Hossan Leong as Mo Mun
- Alice Ho as Auntie Bean Sprout
- Xiang Yun as Meiling
- Chen Tianwen as Pineapple Head
- Jeremy Chan as Curry Puff
- Tay Ping Hui as Dr Zheng
- Elvin Ng as Ah Bee
- Aden Tan as Tan Chee Kiong
- Jesseca Liu as Psychologist
- Zhu Houren as Superintendent Zhu

== Development ==
The series is a collaboration between the Ministry of Communications and Information (MCI) and Mediacorp, in partnership with Chuan Pictures and Tribal Worldwide.

Filming started on 9 December 2016.

== Accolades ==
=== Asian Television Award ===
Asian Television Awards – Acting Awards
Year	Category	Nominated work	Result
Asian Television Awards 2017	Best Theme Song	You Light My Way (指引) by Kit Chan	Nominated

== Music ==
Song title	Song Type	Lyrics	Composer	Performer(s)	Producer
You Light My Way 指引	Opening theme-song	Colin Qi	Jim Lim	Kit Chan	Jim Lim
Eat Already? 吃饱没?	Ending theme-song	Marcus Chin	Jim Lim	Ric Liu; Cavin Soh; Jim Lim	Jim Lim
