= Eat Already? 4 =

- Traditional Chinese: 食飽未？4
- Simplified Chinese: 吃饱没？4
- Hokkien POJ: Chia̍h-pá-bōe? Sì
- Genre: Family; Time-travel; Pioneer Generation
- Directed by: Kelvin Tong 唐永健
- Starring: Chen Shucheng; Hong Huifang; Elvin Ng; Rebecca Lim; Sheila Sim; Dennis Chew; Zhu Houren; Richard Low; Zen Chong
- Opening theme: 酸甜苦涩 by Serene Koong 龚芝怡
- Ending theme: Segments of Next Episode
- Country of origin: Singapore
- Original languages: Mixed Dialogue (Singaporean Hokkien and Cantonese)

Production
- Producer: Theresa Teng
- Running time: approx. 23 minutes

Original release
- Network: Mediacorp Channel 8
- Release: 9 February 2018

Related
- Happy Can Already! 3; GeTai Challenge (Season 2); Eat Already? (2016) Eat Already? 2 (2017) Eat Already? 3 (2017)

Eat Already? 4 (Chinese: 吃饱没？4) is a Singaporean Cantonese- and Hokkien-language drama series which is telecast on Singapore's free-to-air channel, Mediacorp Channel 8. It stars Chen Shucheng, Hong Huifang, Elvin Ng, Rebecca Lim, Sheila Sim, Dennis Chew, Zhu Houren, Richard Low and Zen Chong as the casts of the fourth installment.

This would be the fourth drama in non-Mandarin Chinese varieties to be produced on Channel 8 after a 30-year hiatus.

This series is primarily targeted at Singaporean elderly as most of them speak non-Mandarin varieties at home. This is the series finale to the Eat Already? series.

== Casts ==
- Chen Shucheng as Yuan Yongming
- Hong Huifang as Auntie Yuan
- Li Yinzhu as Ah Niu Sao
- Elvin Ng as Chen Zhiwen
- Richard Low as Chen Zhiwen
- Aden Tan as Chen Zhiqiang
- He Yingying as Mei Mei
- Zhu Houren as Zhu Hanjie
- Anna Lim as Zhu Jinfeng
- Rebecca Lim as Zhu Ruiyun
- Ethan Ng as Oliver
- Desmond Tan as Oliver
- Marcus Chin as Ah Soon
- Liu Lingling as Kym Ma
- Lee Bao'en as Pei Shi
- Sheila Sim as Cheryl
- Zen Chong as Weijie
- Dennis Chew as Auntie Lucy
- Douglas Kung as Brother De
- Michelle Wong as Secretary Wong
- Chew Chor Meng as Old Zhou
- Gurmit Singh as Private Detective

== Awards and nominations ==
=== Star Awards 2019 ===
Star Awards – Acting Awards
Accolades	Nominees	Category	Result
Star Awards 2019 Award Ceremony 红星大奖2019颁奖礼	Ethan Ng Kai En 黄凯恩	Young Talent Award 青平果奖	Nominated
Star Awards 2019 Award Ceremony 红星大奖2019颁奖礼	Sheila Sim 沈琳宸	Best Supporting Actress 最佳女配角	Nominated
