= Liu Lingling (Singaporean host) =

Singaporean host and actress (born 1963)

- Born: 1963 (age 62–63); Singapore
- Other names: Lau Leng Leng; Liu Lee Lyne; Michelle Liu
- Occupations: Host; actress; singer
- Years active: 1969–present
- Spouse: Khoo Jin-an (m. 1996)
- Children: 1
- Relatives: Angie Lau (sister)

Chinese name
- Traditional Chinese: 劉玲玲
- Simplified Chinese: 刘玲玲
- Hanyu Pinyin: Liú Línglíng

Liu Lingling (born 1963) is a Singaporean host and singer who has been active in the getai scene for more than five decades. As an actress, she has appeared in multiple Mediacorp drama series and local films.

== Early life and career ==
Liu's parents are from Malaysia. They registered their marriage in Singapore and Liu was born in Singapore. Spending her childhood years in Malaysia, Liu came back to Singapore when she was six for her primary school education. Liu has a younger sister, Angie, who is a getai singer.

Liu began singing on the getai stage when she was six, earning around fifty cents to one dollar per show at that point in time. Soon after, due to the authorities banning young children under 12 from performing, Liu halted her getai performances for a few years until she was 12. Liu's father, who used to be an instructor coaching Chinese opera performers, trained Liu vigoriously where Liu would wake up at 5am daily for vocal training, followed by cardio exercises before heading to school for classes. After school, Liu would again attend vocal lessons. Liu had wanted to give up but persisted nonetheless as she had to financially support her family. In the 1970s, Liu gradually commanded better pay where she would earn about 15 dollars per show when she was around 12. She dropped out of school when she was in secondary one.

In an interview in 2018, Liu revealed that she earns about S$8,000 to S$10,000 a month from different company D&D and community gigs during the non-peak season. During the Hungry Ghost Festival, she earns around S$40,000 on average. Liu claimed that a bulk of her earnings, about 50 percent of it, are spent on custom-made clothes and accessories for her performances.

== Personal life ==
Liu has been married to Khoo Jin-an (邱金岸), a businessman who is two years younger, since 1996. Liu underwent in vitro fertilisation (IVF) procedures for 10 years, spending S$100,000 in the process. Conceived through artificial insemination, Liu gave birth to a son, Caleb (Xiangxiang), at the age of 50 in September 2013.

Liu is a devout Buddhist.

== Filmography ==
Liu has appeared in the following programmes and films:

=== Television series ===
- Portrait of Home (2005)
- Destiny (2005)
- I Not Stupid Too (2006)
- Marry Me (2013)
- 118 (2014 - 2015)
- Run Rachael Run (2016)
- 118 II (2016 - 2017)
- Eat Already? 2 (2017)
- Eat Already? 3 (2017)
- Eat Already? 4 (2018)
- A Million Dollar Dream (2018)
- Mister Flower (2020)
- Soul Old Yet So Young (2021)
- Fix My Life (2023)
- Whatever Will Be, Will Be (2023)
- The Landlady Singer (2023)
- To Be Loved (2024)
- The Landlady Singer Returns (2024 - 2025)

=== Film ===
- Romance in the 7th Month (1994; television film)
- Money No Enough (1998)
- That One No Enough (1999)
- I Not Stupid Too (2006)
- The Vietnamese Bride (2006)
- 881 (2007)
- 12 Lotus (2008)
- Happy Go Lucky (2010)
- Homecoming (2011)
- My Dog Dou Dou (2012)
- Letters from the South (2013)
- Everybody's Business (2013)
- Filial Party (2014)
- Bring Back the Dead (2015)
- 3688 (2015)
- Mr. Unbelievable (2015)
- The Big Day (2018)
- Fat Hope (2024)
- King of Hawkers (2024)

=== Variety and reality show ===
- GeTai Challenge 2015 (2015; judge)
- Happy Can Already! (2016)
- Happy Can Already! 3 (2017)
- GeTai Challenge 2018 (2018; season 2 - judge)
- The Destined One (2019; guest appearance)
- Dare to Try (2021; guest appearance)
- Happy Together (2021)
- A Night Under The Stars (2022; guest appearance)

== Awards and nominations ==
Year	Award	Category	Nominated work	Result	Ref
2018	Star Awards	Top 10 Most Popular Female Artistes	—N/a	Nominated	
2022	Star Awards	Top 10 Most Popular Female Artistes	—N/a	Nominated	
2025	Star Awards	Top 10 Most Popular Female Artistes	—N/a	Nominated	
