= The Destined One =

Reality TV show

- Chinese: 众里寻一
- Genre: Dating Show
- Presented by: Guo Liang
- Country of origin: Singapore
- Original language: Mandarin
- No. of seasons: 2
- No. of episodes: 7

Production
- Producer: Mediacorp
- Production location: Singapore
- Running time: 60 minutes

Original release
- Network: Channel 8 (Singapore)
- Release: July 1 – August 12, 2019

The Destined One (Chinese: 众里寻一) is a reality dating show; for each episode, four local celebrities are invited to play matchmaker, and a group of 10 men and women will attempt to find the right match.

== Format ==
In each episode, four men or women will be hidden from view as the "fated persons (有缘人)". The remaining six men or women stand at the podium to award points (1 to 10) to all the fated persons based on star matchmakers' recommendations and interactions with the fated persons.

Each episode has five rounds, and one fated person with the lowest points will be eliminated from the round. In the 1st round, the star matchmakers will introduce the fated persons and make their recommendations. The 2nd round is a question-and-answer round between the fated persons and the participants at the podium. In the 3rd round, the remaining two fated persons will perform their talent. In the 4th round, the last fated person will ask the participants at the podium some questions before finalizing the choice. In the 5th round, the fated person will have the chance to choose and confess to his/her selected ideal match from the podium. The chosen man/woman will either accept or reject the fated person. If accepted, it will be a successful match; if rejected, it will be unsuccessful.

== Star Matchmakers ==
=== Male Star ===
- Ben Yeo - Episode 3
- Brandon Wong (actor) - Episode 6
- Cavin Soh - Episode 3
- Jeremy Chan - Episode 4
- Lee Teng - Episode 1 | 2 | 6 | 7
- Marcus Chin - Episode 1
- Mark Lee - Episode 5
- Shane Pow - Episode 7
- Yao Wenlong - Episode 2

=== Female Star ===
- Aileen Tan - Episode 1
- Kym Ng - Episode 3, 5 & 7
- Lina Ng - Episodes 4 & 6
- Liu Lingling - Episode 4
- Priscelia Chan - Episode 6
- Pan Lingling - Episode 4
- Quan Yi Fong - Episode 5
- Vivian Lai - Episode 1 | 3 | 4 | 5 | 7
- Zoe Tay - Episode 2

== Production ==
Season 2 of the show had the talent session in season 1 replaced by a psychological test, which experts will analyse to advise participants. The change was because participants for season 2 are worried about the talent session.

== Incident ==
One of the female participants who successfully matched with another male participant was alleged to have a boyfriend before the show's production. The show producer clarified that participants were asked if they were unmarried and to sign a declaration of singlehood during auditions. The show also did not prohibit the participants from engaging in relationships during the production.

== See also ==
- List of variety and infotainment programmes broadcast by MediaCorp Channel 8
- Media of Singapore
