= Wonderful! Liang Xi Mei =

- Theatrical release poster
- Directed by: Jack Neo
- Written by: Jack Neo; Ivan Ho
- Produced by: Jack Neo; Melvin Ang
- Starring: Jack Neo; Mark Lee; Henry Thia; Benjamin Josiah Tan; Wang Lei; Jaspers Lai; Chua Lee Lian; Cavin Soh
- Edited by: Yim Mun Chong
- Production company: J Team Productions
- Distributed by: Golden Village Pictures
- Release date: February 15, 2018; (Singapore)
- Running time: 131 minutes
- Country: Singapore
- Languages: Mandarin; Hokkien; Cantonese

Wonderful! Liang Xi Mei (Chinese: 旺得福梁细妹) is a 2018 Singaporean Chinese New Year comedy film directed by Jack Neo. It stars Neo, alongside Mark Lee, Henry Thia, Benjamin Josiah Tan, Wang Lei, Jaspers Lai, Chua Lee Lian, and Cavin Soh. The film was released on 15 February 2018 in Singapore and Malaysia.

== Plot ==
Although Liang Xi Mei (Jack Neo) is retired, she spends her time looking after her obedient grandchildren. However, Robert (Mark Lee), her eldest son adds to her woes as he is always dreaming of making a fortune through easy means. She pins all her hopes on her youngest son, Albert (Benjamin Josiah Tan). Her favouritism stirs up jealousy within Robert, who vows to strike it rich to win Liang Xi Mei’s approval. By chance, Robert picks up the doll that is actually the Goddess of Fortune (Cai Ping Kai). She helps Robert but also appeals to him to be more down to earth and practical in his pursuit of success and wealth. Instead, he turns into an ingrate as soon as his hawker business takes off. His arrogance incurs the wrath of the God of Misfortune (Gadrick Chin) who decides to teach him a lesson. Soon, trouble ensues among Liang Xi Mei’s family and their best friends Guang Dong Po (Wang Lei) and Lion King (Henry Thia).

== Cast ==
- Jack Neo as Liang Xi Mei/Liang Po Po
- Mark Lee as Robert
- Henry Thia as Lion King/Ah Gong
- Benjamin Josiah Tan as Albert
- Wang Lei as Guang Dong Po/Wang Lei
- Jaspers Lai as Merlion King
- Chua Lee Lian as Mary
- Cavin Soh as Kway Teow King
- Cai Ping Kai as Goddess of Fortune
- Gadrick Chin as God of Misfortune
- Toh Xin Hui as Ah Girl
- Zhang Wei as Uncle Lee
- Ryan Lian as Kidnapper
- Noah Yap as Kidnapper
- Richie Koh as Big Boss

=== Cameo ===
- Yeo Yann Yann as Mrs Fu
- Aileen Tan as Mrs Lu
- Irene Ang as Mrs Shou
- Apple Chan as Young Liang Xi Mei
- Leon Lim as Young Uncle Lee

== Reception ==
=== Critical reception ===
Yip Wai Yee of The Straits Times gave the film a 1 out of 5 stars, as "showing up only at the beginning of the film and then again briefly at the end, she feels like a complete afterthought, with her name slapped onto the movie title only for marketing purposes." Instead, it mainly focuses on "Ximei's son Robert and his obsession to get rich".

Samfrey Tan of The New Paper rated it a 1/5, citing "distasteful Hokkien puns and clownish slapstick abound, broken only by the occasional cheap sexual reference".

=== Box office ===
On February 22, 2018, one week after its release, the film crossed the RM$3 million mark in the Malaysian box office.
