= Star Awards for Best Comedy Performer =

Singaporean television award

Star Awards for Best Comedy Performer 最佳喜剧演员
- Awarded for: Best Performance by a MediaCorp Comedian
- Country: Singapore
- Presented by: MediaCorp
- First award: 1998
- Final award: 2005

The Star Awards for Best Comedy Performer was an award presented annually at the Star Awards, a ceremony that was established in 1994.

The category was introduced in 1998, at the 5th Star Awards ceremony; Mark Lee received the award for his role in Comedy Nite and it was given in honour of a MediaCorp comedian who has delivered an outstanding performance in a comedy. The nominees were determined by a team of judges employed by MediaCorp; winners were selected by a majority vote from the entire judging panel.

Since its inception, the award was given to five comedians. Bryan Wong is the most recent and final winner in this category, for his role in KP Club. Lee is the only comedian to win in this category four times. In addition, Lee has been nominated on seven occasions, more than any other comedian. Jack Neo holds the record for the most nominations without a win, with three.

The award was discontinued from 2006.

== Recipients ==
Year	Comedian	Title (role if applicable)	Nominees
1998	Mark Lee 李国煌	Comedy Night 搞笑行动	Chew Chor Meng 周初明 — Don't Worry, Be Happy 3 敢敢做个开心人3(Zhang Yingcai 张英才); Huang Wenyong 黄文永 — Don't Worry, Be Happy 3 敢敢做个开心人3(Huang Jinlai 黄金来); Jack Neo 梁志强 — Comedy Night 搞笑行动; Tracer Wong 王裕香 — Don't Worry, Be Happy 3 敢敢做个开心人3 (Chen Jiazhen 陈家珍)
1999	Mark Lee 李国煌	Comedy Nite 搞笑行动	Sharon Au 欧菁仙 — Right Frequency II 播音人II (Cheng Meiguang 程美光); Huang Wenyong 黄文永 — Don't Worry, Be Happy 4 敢敢做个开心人4 (Huang Jinlai 黄金来); Jack Neo 梁志强 — Comedy Nite 搞笑行动; Kym Ng 鐘琴 — Different Strokes Different Cut 剪剪大家乐 (TBC)
2000	Huang Wenyong 黄文永	Don't Worry, Be Happy 5 敢敢做个开心人5 (Huang Jinlai 黄金来)	Sharon Au 欧菁仙 — Soho@Work II 新新关系II (TBC); Mark Lee 李国煌 — Soho@Work II 新新关系II (TBC); Richard Low 刘谦益 — Don't Worry, Be Happy 5 敢敢做个开心人5 (Eugene Tan); Jack Neo 梁志强 — The Return of Liang Ximei 再见梁细妹 (Liang Ximei 梁细妹)
2001	Sharon Au 欧菁仙	Right Frequency III 播音人III (Cheng Meiguang 程美光)	Huang Wenyong 黄文永 — Don't Worry, Be Happy 6 敢敢做个开心人6 (Huang Jinlai 黄金来); Huang Yiliang 黄奕良 — My Genie 我爱精灵 (54088); Fiona Xie 谢宛谕 — My Genie 我爱精灵 (Wenzi 文子); Yao Wenlong 姚彣隆 — My Genie 我爱精灵 (Jian Yuanbao 简元宝)
2002	Mark Lee 李国煌	Katong Ms Oh 加东Miss Oh (Chow Ah Beng 周亚明)	Dennis Chew 周崇庆 — New Dragon's Inn 新龙门客栈 (Dian Xiao-er 店小二); Huang Wenyong 黄文永 — Don't Worry, Be Happy 6敢敢做个开心人6 (Huang Jinlai 黄金来); Richard Low 刘谦益 — I Not Stupid 小孩不笨 (Jerry Khoo); Zoe Tay 郑惠玉 — Katong Ms Oh 加东Miss Oh (Miss Oh)
2003	Mark Lee 李国煌	Comedy Nite 2003 搞笑行动2003	Chew Chor Meng 周初明 — Lobang King 我是Lobang King (Zhang Yingcai 张英才); Huang Yiliang 黄奕良 — My Genie II 我爱精灵II (54088); Moses Lim 林益民 — Comedy Nite 2003 搞笑行动2003; Jeff Wang 王建復 — Lobang King 我是Lobang King (Xu Jiefu 许杰夫)
2004	Marcus Chin 陈建彬	Comedy Nite 搞笑行动	Mark Lee 李国煌 — Comedy Nite 搞笑行动; Moses Lim 林益民 — Comedy Nite 搞笑行动; Patricia Mok 莫小玲 — Comedy Nite 搞笑行动; Zhang Xinxiang 张信祥 — Family Combo 门当户对 (Pierre)
2005	Bryan Wong 王禄江	KP Club 鸡婆俱乐部	Marcus Chin 陈建彬 — King of Variety III 周五娱乐王III; Mark Lee 李国煌 — KP Club 鸡婆俱乐部; Patricia Mok 莫小玲 — KP Club 鸡婆俱乐部; Zhang Xinxiang 张信祥 — Family Combo II 门当户对II (Pierre)

^{^[I]} Each year is linked to the article about the Star Awards held that year

== Category facts ==
Most wins

Rank	1st	2nd
Comedian	Mark Lee	Sharon Au; Marcus Chin; Huang Wenyong; Bryan Wong
Total wins	4 wins	1 win

Most nominations

Rank	1st	2nd	3rd	4th
Comedian	Mark Lee	Huang Wenyong	Sharon Au; Jack Neo	Chew Chor Meng; Marcus Chin; Huang Yiliang; Moses Lim; Richard Low; Patricia Mok; Zhang Xinxiang
Total nominations	7 nominations	5 nominations	3 nominations	2 nominations
