= Eat Already? =

2016 Singaporean drama TV series

- Traditional Chinese: 食飽未？
- Simplified Chinese: 吃饱没？
- Hokkien POJ: Chia̍h-pá--bōe?
- Genre: Family; Sitcom; Pioneer Generation
- Written by: Xu Liwen 许丽雯
- Directed by: Royston Tan
- Starring: Li Yinzhu; Elvin Ng; Marcus Chin; Aileen Tan; Wang Lei; Aden Tan; He Yingying
- Opening theme: Eat Already? (吃饱没) by Dream FZ
- Ending theme: Segments of Next Episode
- Country of origin: Singapore
- Original languages: Mixed Dialogue, primarily Singaporean Hokkien
- No. of episodes: 10

Production
- Producer: Ding Meilian 丁美莲
- Running time: approx. 23 minutes

Original release
- Network: Mediacorp Channel 8
- Release: 9 September – 11 November 2016

Related
- Happy Can Already!; Eat Already? 2 Eat Already? 3 (2017) Eat Already? 4 (2018)

Eat Already? (Chinese: 吃饱没？) is a Singaporean Hokkien-language drama series which is telecast on Singapore's free-to-air channel, Mediacorp Channel 8. It stars Li Yinzhu, Elvin Ng, Marcus Chin, Aileen Tan, Wang Lei, Aden Tan and He Yingying of the series.

Due to the restrictions of the Speak Mandarin Campaign, this series and Happy Can Already! were the first non-Mandarin Chinese shows produced for local television in more than three decades. Primarily in Singaporean Hokkien, the show targets Singaporean seniors, many of whom still speak non-Mandarin Chinese varieties, including Cantonese and Teochew, at home. It gives them various tips for healthy living and aging. While most of the characters speak Hokkien, Teochew was used by Chen Liping and Zoe Tay in several episodes.

== Plot ==
The series is set in a coffee shop and it focuses on an elderly widow, Ah Niu Sao (Li Yinzhu), who works as a dishwasher and cleaner in a coffee shop in order to support her two sons. They are Ah Bee (Elvin Ng), who is formerly a gambler and currently a chef, and Ah Kiong (Aden Tan), who is a disabled person. As the series progresses, she faces many kinds of difficulties in life but manages to pull through due to the help from her neighbours and various healthcare support schemes.

== Cast ==
- Li Yinzhu as Ah Niu Sao
- Elvin Ng as Tan Chee Boon
- Aden Tan as Tan Chee Kiong
- He Ying Ying as Meimei
- Marcus Chin as Ah Shun
- Aileen Tan as Ah Shun Sao
- Wang Lei as Niao Wang
- Brandon Wong as Daniel
- Chen Liping as Ms. Tan
- Kym Ng as Dr. Tay
- Zoe Tay as Dr. Tay
- Nick Teo as Meimei Brother

== Episodes ==
No.	Title	Original release date
1	"Episode 1"	9 September 2016; PG Some Disturbing Scenes
A cooking competition is happening at a Community Centre. Amongst the participants is Ah Bee, who wins the competition. Ah Bee starts his thank-you speech by recounting his past; how he was contemplating suicide just a mere few months ago. Ah Niu Sao finds Ah Bee sleeping, and not fulfilling his promise to bring his brother Ah Qiang to the Enabling Village. She has no choice but to do it herself. She receives a call from her boss, who threatens to fire her if she doesn’t report to work. Ah Niu Sao goes to work but faints.
2	"Episode 2"	16 September 2016 PG
Bird King coughs incessantly and the club members urge him to visit the doctor. Dr. Tay reports that he has high cholesterol, and borderline high blood pressure. She gives Bird King some tips about healthy living. Ah Niu Sao receives her pay, but realizes that it is short of $50. Uncle Soon tries to help but the boss threatens to fire her. Uncle Soon advises Ah Niu Sao to seek help at Meet-the-people Session. There, Ah Niu Sao receives a call from Ah Qiang. He tells her that the loansharks have beaten Ah Bee up.
3	"Episode 3"	23 September 2016 PG
Ah Bee’s nonchalance despite being beaten up by loansharks disappoints Ah Niu Sao. Witnessing his mum’s sadness, Ah Qiang agrees to check out the Enabling Village to get a job. There, he meets Meimei, a volunteer, whom he warms up to. Ah Bee steals Ah Niu Sao’s salary and gambles it all away. Bird-King starts showing signs of dementia, and his friends urges him to see a doctor.
4	"Episode 4"	30 September 2016 PG
Bird King gets progressively more forgetful. DaPao is worried about Bird King’s condition, and persuades Bird King to go for a check-up. Ah Niu Sao desperately looks around for Ah Bee. She hears the song “Jia Hou” playing at a getai, and ends up in tears. Unbeknownst to him, Ah Bee is looking on from afar. After seeing how Ah Niu Sao is worried for him, he decides to go home and turn over a new leaf.
5	"Episode 5"	7 October 2016 PG
The slap from Ah Niu Sao brought Ah Bee to his senses. He decides to turn over a new leaf and attends a cooking class. He subsequently gets a job at a restaurant and his boss challenges Ah Bee to cook a dish for him. Ah Niu Sao frets over Bird King’s illness.
6	"Episode 6"	14 October 2016 PG
Ah Qiang starts falling for Meimei. He loses sleep over this and Ah Bee and Ah Niu Sao decide to give him some advice. Auntie Soon urges Ah Niu Sao to join her and several other old folks at the Senior Citizens’ corner to make friends. Da Pao brings Bird King to the Senior Citizens’ corner as well to let him socialize in order to prevent his dementia from getting worse.
7	"Episode 7"	21 October 2016 PG
Minister of State for Communications and Information Chee Hong Tat shares tips on healthy eating and active ageing with the seniors at a talk happening in Toa Payoh East CC. Ah Bee surprise Bird King with a ‘healthy birthday cake’, but Bird King forgets that it is his birthday. Da Pao worries that Bird King he may one day forget everyone. Ah Bee bumps into his old friends who cajol him to go to the gambling den. Will he give in to temptation once more?
8	"Episode 8"	28 October 2016 PG
Ah Niu Sao decides to enroll herself in a computer course in order to search for Bird King’s son through social media. Both Ah Bee and Ah Qiang suspect that Ah Niu Sao has a hidden agenda, which is to search for their long-lost sister. Ah Bee confesses to his boss about his gambling debts. How will his boss react?
9	"Episode 9"	4 November 2016; PG Some Violence
Ah Qiang finds out that his rival in love is actually Meimei’s brother. Ah Bee’s creditor turns to Ah Qiang to pay for his debts. Ah Qiang gets injured in the process, and Ah Bee is stricken with guilt. Bird King reunites with his son, but tension arises. Ah Niu Sao suspects that Meimei could be her long-lost daughter.
10	"Episode 10"	11 November 2016 PG
Ah Niu Sao forgives Ah Bee’s moment of folly and the two reminisce on memories of Ah Niu Sao’s daughter Xiao Mei. Ah Niu Sao shares her suspicion that Meimei could be her long-lost daughter. Ah Bee rents a stall in the coffeeshop and starts his own business.

== Reception ==
Despite being intended for an elderly audience, the show has gained some popularity among Singaporeans of other age groups. Eat Already became the second Channel 8 series known to have Cabinet Ministers make cameo appearances. Low Yen Ling had introduced the courses offered by the Lifelong Learning Institute in her capacity as then-Parliamentary Secretary for Education (now Minister of State for Trade and Industry and Culture, Community and Youth), while Chee Hong Tat engaged senior citizens in his Bishan-Toa Payoh GRC in his capacity as Minister of State for Communications and Information (now Minister of State for Transport and Foreign Affairs). The series received positive acclaim with 250,000 viewers on average, and has garnered over 1.6 million online views on Youtube.

== Awards and nominations ==
Organisation	Year	Category	Nominee(s)	Result	Ref
Star Awards	2017	Best Theme Song	Dream FZ	Nominated	
