= Little Sunshine =

2023 Malaysian comedy film

Little Sunshine 小胖流浪记
- Directed by: Tai Min Hwee
- Starring: Louis Lau Heng Kai; Tommy Kuan; Beauty Teoh; Danny One; Eric Lin
- Distributed by: MM2 Entertainment
- Release date: 19 January 2023 (Malaysia)
- Running time: 1 hour 25 minutes
- Country: Malaysia
- Language: Mandarin

Little Sunshine (Chinese: 小胖流浪记) is a 2023 Malaysian comedy film. The film tells the funny adventure of a kid named Xiao Pang after he ran away from home when his parents confiscated his mobile phone.

Directed by Tai Min Hwee, it is adapted from the popular 2009 DVD film of the same name.

The film is released on 19 January 2023 in cinemas in Malaysia. It is one of the five 2023 Malaysian and Singaporean Chinese New Year films, including Ma, I Love You, Returning Home and What! The Heist (Malaysia-Singapore) and The King of Musang King (Singapore-Malaysia).

== Synopsis ==
A kid named Xiao Pang has an insatiable appetite and no interest in studying. His parents promise him a mobile phone if he study and does well in his exams. This method worked, he works hard and earns the phone, but a new problem now comes up: phone addiction. His parents arrange for him to see a child psychologist, their son had chosen to run away from home as he goes on a self adventure.

== Cast ==
- Louis Lau Heng Kai
- Tommy Kuan
- Beauty Teoh
- Danny One
- Eric Lin
- Dennis Lim Ming
- Wong Chee Wai
- Batu Lim

== Production ==
The film is directed by Tai Min Hwee (戴敏非), and adapted from his 2009 popular low budget direct-to-release Malaysian film of the same name, which was the childhood memories of many Chinese-speaking teenagers. It is not a remake of the original film but instead a retelling of the story.
