= Star Awards for Best Evergreen Artiste =

Singaporean television (2016–2023)

Star Awards for Best Evergreen Artiste 常青演绎奖
- Awarded for: Best Performance by a Veteran Artiste for a Programme
- Country: Singapore
- Presented by: Mediacorp
- First award: 2016
- Final award: 2023
- Most recent winner: Xiang Yun (2023)

Highlights
- Most awards: Xiang Yun (4)
- Most nominations: Xiang Yun (7)

The Star Awards for Best Evergreen Artiste is an award presented annually at the Star Awards, a ceremony that was established in 1994.

The category was introduced in 2016, at the 22nd Star Awards ceremony; Chen Shucheng received the award for his performance in Super Senior and it is given in honour of a Mediacorp veteran artiste who has delivered an outstanding performance in their field of profession. In order to be nominated for the award, the artiste must be over 50 years in age and has garnered over 25 years of performing experience in the industry. The nominees of the award are still eligible to run for other performing categories. The nominees are determined by a team of judges employed by Mediacorp; winners are selected by a majority vote from the entire judging panel.

Since its inception, the award has been given to three veteran artistes. Xiang Yun is the most recent winner in this category. Since the ceremony held in 2023, Xiang Yun remains as the only veteran artiste to win in this category four times, surpassing Chen who has two wins. In addition, Xiang Yun has been nominated on seven occasions, more than any other veteran artiste. Hong Huifang and Zhu Houren hold the record for the most nominations without a win, with four.

From 2018, the nominees for this award were selected without any reference to their respective work titles.

== Recipients ==
Year	Artiste	Work title (role)	Nominees	Ref
2016	Chen Shucheng	Super Senior (Chen Yalai 陈亚来)	Chen Tianwen — 118 (Zhang Tiancheng 张天成); Hong Huifang — Good Luck (Lin-He Xiangniang 林何香娘); Lin Meijiao — The Journey: Our Homeland (Su Qiufeng 苏秋凤); Xiang Yun — Super Senior (Yu Fang 于芳)	
2017	Xiang Yun	Peace & Prosperity (Shen Ping'an 沈平安)	Chen Shucheng — Fire Up (Zhuang Dexian 庄德贤); Hong Huifang — If Only I Could (Li Xiumei 李秀美); Aileen Tan — Hero (Huang Lili 黄丽丽); Rayson Tan — Life - Fear Not (Zhuang Daoqiang 庄道强)	
2018	Chen Shucheng	—N/a	Marcus Chin; Hong Huifang; Xiang Yun; Zhu Houren	
2019	Xiang Yun	—N/a	Chew Chor Meng; Marcus Chin; Richard Low; Aileen Tan	
2021	Jin Yinji	—N/a	Chen Shucheng; Marcus Chin; Richard Low; Wang Yuqing; Xiang Yun; Zhu Houren	
2022	Xiang Yun	—N/a	Chen Shucheng; Lin Meijiao; Wang Yuqing; Zhu Houren	
2023	Xiang Yun	—N/a	Hong Huifang; Richard Low; Aileen Tan; Zhu Houren	

== Nominees distribution chart ==
Colour key
Artiste won the award
Artiste was nominated for the award
Artiste was not nominated for the award
Artiste is currently nominated for the award

Artiste	Year							Wins	Noms
Artiste	2016	2017	2018	2019	2021	2022	2023	Wins	Noms
Xiang Yun 向云	N	1	N	2	N	3	4	4	7
Chen Shucheng 陈澍城	1	N	2		N	N		2	5
Jin Yinji 金银姬					1			1	1
Hong Huifang 洪慧芳	N	N	N				N	0	4
Zhu Houren 朱厚任			N		N	N	N	0	4
Aileen Tan 陈丽贞		N		N			N	0	3
Marcus Chin 陈建彬			N	N	N			0	3
Richard Low 刘谦益				N	N		N	0	3
Lin Meijiao 林梅娇	N					N		0	2
Wang Yuqing 王昱清					N	N		0	2
Chen Tianwen 陈天文	N							0	1
Rayson Tan 陈泰铭		N						0	1
Chew Chor Meng 周初明				N				0	1

== Award records ==
Record	Artiste	Count	Remarks
Most wins	Xiang Yun	4	2017, 2019, 2022, 2023
Most nominations	Xiang Yun	7	2016, 2017, 2018, 2019, 2021, 2022, 2023
Longest gap between wins	Xiang Yun	3 years	2019—2022
Shortest gap between wins (consecutive wins)	Xiang Yun	1 year	2022—2023
Most nominations before first award	Xiang Yun	1	Nominated in 2016 and won in 2017
Most nominations without a win	Hong Huifang	4	2016, 2017, 2018, 2023
Most nominations without a win	Zhu Houren	4	2018, 2021, 2022, 2023
Longest gap between nominations	Lin Meijiao	6 years	2016—2022
Most consecutive nominations	Xiang Yun	7	2016, 2017, 2018, 2019, 2021, 2022, 2023
Won at first nomination	Chen Shucheng		2016
Won at first nomination	Jin Yinji		2021
Won awards in acting categories and Evergreen Artiste	Chen Shucheng		2012, 2019 (Best Supporting Actor); 2016, 2018 (Evergreen Artiste)
Won awards in acting categories and Evergreen Artiste	Xiang Yun		1998, 2000, 2001, 2009, 2023 (Best Supporting Actress); 2017, 2019, 2022, 2023 (Evergreen Artiste)
Nominated for awards in acting categories and Evergreen Artiste in the same year	Chen Tianwen		2016 (Best Supporting Actor)
Nominated for awards in acting categories and Evergreen Artiste in the same year	Chen Shucheng		2017, 2018, 2021 (Best Supporting Actor)
Nominated for awards in acting categories and Evergreen Artiste in the same year	Aileen Tan		2017, 2019, 2023 (Best Supporting Actress)
Nominated for awards in acting categories and Evergreen Artiste in the same year	Marcus Chin		2018 (Best Supporting Actor)
Nominated for awards in acting categories and Evergreen Artiste in the same year	Zhu Houren		2022, 2023 (Best Supporting Actor)
Nominated for awards in acting categories and Evergreen Artiste in the same year	Lin Meijiao		2022 (Best Supporting Actress)
Nominated for awards in acting categories and Evergreen Artiste in the same year	Xiang Yun		2023 (Best Supporting Actress)

== Multiple awards and nominations ==
The following individuals received two or more Best Evergreen Artiste awards:

Wins	Artiste	Nominations
4	Xiang Yun 向云	7
2	Chen Shucheng 陈澍城	5

The following individuals received two or more Best Evergreen Artiste nominations:

Nominations	Artiste
7	Xiang Yun 向云
5	Chen Shucheng 陈澍城
4	Hong Huifang 洪慧芳
4	Zhu Houren 朱厚任
3	Marcus Chin 陈建彬
3	Richard Low 刘谦益
3	Aileen Tan 陈丽贞
2	Lin Meijiao 林梅娇
2	Wang Yuqing 王昱清
