= Fat Hope =

2024 Singaporean comedy-drama film

- Theatrical release poster with the supposed release date
- Chinese: 超磅名模
- Literal meaning: "Overweight model"
- Hanyu Pinyin: Chāo bàng míng mó
- Directed by: Joyce Lee
- Produced by: Joyce Lee; Shelin Ng
- Starring: Alien Huang; Lin Yu-pin; Liu Lingling
- Production company: Encore Films
- Distributed by: Golden Village Pictures; Encore Films
- Running time: 125 minutes
- Country: Singapore
- Language: Mandarin

Fat Hope (Chinese: 超磅名模) is a yet-to-be-released Singaporean comedy-drama film directed by Joyce Lee. It stars Alien Huang, Lin Yu-pin and Liu Lingling. Although it was initially announced that the film will open in Singapore cinemas on 8 February 2024, it has not been released as of April 2026.

== Synopsis ==
An aloof runway supermodel turns overweight after being cursed and must find ways to lose weight to save her career.

== Cast ==
- Alien Huang as Nathan
- Lin Yu-pin as Alisa
- Liu Lingling
- Quan Yi Fong
- Sonia Chew
- Hong Huifang
- Wang Lei
- Henry Thia
- Jeffrey Xu
- Xixi Lim
- Abigail Chay

== Production and release ==
Principal photography commenced in 2018, with post-production audio mixing work done in Thailand. Originally intended to play in theatres in 2020, the film's release was delayed several times due to the COVID-19 pandemic, lead actor Alien Huang’s death in September 2020 and production problems. In early September 2023, it was announced that the film will be released on 8 February 2024 in Singapore, during the Chinese New Year holidays.
