= Make It Big Big =

2019 Singaporean comedy film

- Theatrical release poster
- Chinese: 玉建煌崇大件事
- Directed by: Mark Lee
- Starring: Mark Lee; Dennis Chew; Marcus Chin; Chen Biyu
- Edited by: Yim Mun Chong
- Production companies: King Kong Media Production; Mediacorp mm2 Entertainment
- Distributed by: Golden Village Pictures
- Release date: 3 January 2019
- Running time: 108 minutes
- Country: Singapore
- Language: Mandarin

Make It Big Big (Chinese: 玉建煌崇大件事) is a 2019 Singaporean comedy film directed by Mark Lee in his feature directorial debut. The film stars Lee, Dennis Chew, Marcus Chin and Chen Biyu. The film was released on 3 January 2019 and revolves around the daily lives of the four radio presenters of Love 972 "The Breakfast Quartet" show. The film also features cameo appearances by Singaporean and overseas entertainers and DJs from LOVE 97.2FM. It debuted in fourth place on the box office chart in Singapore.

== Cast ==
- Mark Lee as himself
- Dennis Chew as himself
- Marcus Chin as himself
- Chen Biyu as herself

The film also featured many cameo appearances including Zoe Tay, Christopher Lee, Fann Wong, Chew Chor Meng, Jack Neo, Henry Thia, Guo Liang, You Yi, and Chapman To.
