= One More Chance (2005 Singaporean film) =

- Directed by: Jack Neo; Michael Woo; Nan Sing Toh
- Screenplay by: Ho Hee Ann
- Story by: Jack Neo; Boris Boo; Ho Hee Ann
- Produced by: Simon Leong; Hazel Wong; Boris Boo
- Starring: Mark Lee; Marcus Chin; Henry Thia
- Edited by: Delcie Poh
- Music by: Li Yi; Zheng Kai Hua
- Production company: J Team Productions
- Distributed by: Golden Village Pictures
- Release date: 2 September 2005
- Running time: 105 minutes
- Country: Singapore
- Languages: Mandarin; Dialects
- Budget: $1,100,000

One More Chance (Chinese: 三个好人), is a 2005 Singaporean comedy drama film directed by Jack Neo, Michael Woo and Nan Sing Toh.

== Plot ==
Chin Wu Huang, the head of an investment company is arrested for fraud. In jail, he is put in the same cell as compulsive gambler Ong Beng Kuang and serial housebreaker Goh Chun Hwee. When he is released, he struggles to get a job.

== Cast ==
- Mark Lee as Chin Wu Huang
- Marcus Chin as Ong Beng Kuang
- Henry Thia as Goh Chun Hwee
- Apple Hong as Bee Poh
- Lina Ng
- Chen Hong
- Megan Zheng as Chin Xiaowei

== Release ==
The film released in theatres in Singapore on 2 September 2005.

== Reception ==
Li Yiyun of Lianhe Zaobao rated the film three-and-a-half stars for entertainment and two-and-a-half stars for art. Lin Zengyin of Lianhe Wanbao rated the film three stars out of five. Ngiam Ying Lan of The Business Times rated the film C, writing "It's understandable that box-office receipts is the foremost consideration for Neo, easily Singapore's most prolific filmmaker. But what's regrettable is this run-of-the-mill superficial layering of toilet humour and glib coffeeshop chatter, with no payoff in sight. The ending is so lamentably literal one wonders if Neo ever gets tired of rehashing what's already been flogged to death in countless classroom debates and periodic public controversies."
