= Number 1 (2020 film) =

2020 Singaporean comedy film

- Directed by: Ong Kuo Sin
- Written by: Jaspers Lai
- Produced by: Boi Kwong
- Starring: Mark Lee; Jaspers Lai; Kiwebaby Chang; Kenneth Chia; Darius Tan; Henry Thia; Gadrick Chin; Caryn Cheng; Cassandra See; Gina Tan
- Production companies: mm2 Entertainment; Clover Films
- Distributed by: Shaw Organisation
- Release dates: 22 October 2020 (Singapore); 10 February 2021 (Taiwan)
- Running time: 98 minutes
- Country: Singapore
- Languages: Mandarin, Hokkien
- Box office: S$805,835 (Singapore)

Number 1 (Chinese: 男儿王; pinyin: Nán'érwáng; lit. 'King of [True] Men') is a 2020 Singaporean comedy-drama film written by Jaspers Lai and directed by Ong Kuo Sin. The film stars Mark Lee, Jaspers Lai, Kiwebaby Chang, Kenneth Chia, Darius Tan and Henry Thia. The film revolves around an out-of-work middle-aged man who accidentally becomes a night club drag queen sensation. Mark Lee, Henry Thia and Gadrick Chin would later collaborate again in the future local celebrity and successful film director Jack Neo durian movie known as The King of Musang King, in which Lee also portrayed a very similar role just like this film where both roles featured his characters looking for many jobs and work on them but ultimately were all failed attempts, which led them working as a durian seller with his family in that film and drag queen in this film respectively.

The film was released on 22 October 2020 in Singapore and released on 10 February 2021 in Taiwan. It received two nominations at the 57th Golden Horse Awards, including Best Leading Actor for Mark Lee, and won Best Makeup and Costume Design.

== Plot ==
Chow Chee Beng was performing at his company's annual New Year's Eve dinner when he was handed his retrenchment letter by his superior. While they countdown to the New Year's Day at the event, his wife, Marie, revealed to him that she was pregnant with their second child. As Chinese New Year approaches, Chow was seen clearing out his desk. He starts searching for a job with the help of a recruitment agency, but to no avail. After multiple failed interviews, Chow was given one last place to interview at while his recruitment agent advises him to sell his house and car for cash. He meets up with Fa Ge, the owner of the nightclub, Number 1, for an interview. Chow was hired without going through the interview and Fa Ge brings him to the nightclub. After taking up the role, Chow realises that he was working at a drag queen nightclub and hides the fact from his family. The Queens Brotherhood, made up of Unicorn, Tiny, Italy, Money and Pearl - are the five main performers at Number 1. It was revealed that Unicorn was a soldier who went absent without official leave (AWOL) after he was arrested at the nightclub by military police officers. Chow was asked to fill in for Unicorn, as Pearl would be unable to take center stage if they only had 4 people performing. Chow reluctantly takes up the gig. When Chow receives his appearance fee for his first performance, he decides to continue performing to pay off his housing and car loans.

Fa Ge introduces Chow to the landlord of the nightclub, Teo Chew Phoenix, where she made Chow drunk and he passed out. The next day, Chow wakes up in Pearl's house where he finds out why Pearl ended up working at the nightclub. Gradually, as Chow interacted more with the other performers at the nightclub, he finds out more about the plights of the other performers and the stigma that they faced in society as drag performers. One night, while doing their usual performance, Fa Ge accidentally played the instrumental track and as the song starts playing, Pearl hesitates to sing live. Chow begins singing and saves the performance. Marie is beginning to have suspicions about Chow's unusual behaviours at home. After their first live performance, the audience at the nightclub demanded that the Queens Brotherhood sing live instead of lip syncing, which results in Pearl giving up the centre stage for Chow to perform the Hokkien cover of 'I Will Survive'. After a live streamer, Happy Polla, was saved from choking by a viewer watching the Queens Brotherhood's performance online, the viewer announced that he was influenced by their performance of 'I Will Survive' to step forward. This resulted in the performance video going viral. Number 1 and its performers begins to gain more mainstream media coverage and Chow oust Pearl as the highest paid performer at the nightclub.

Chow had a fight with Pearl and the other performers backstage after a performance as Pearl was unhappy that Chow took over his spot as center stage. After which, Teo Chew Phoenix exposed to his family that Chow was performing at the nightclub in drag, which results in him quitting Number 1 and selling his house and car. As Chow and the other performers made up, he went back to the nightclub to perform to raise funds for the elderly home. Marie and her sister Judy catch him performing again and as they argued, Marie goes into labour. Unable to get to a hospital in time, the Queens Brotherhood and Chow helped with the delivery with Marie gave birth to a pair of twins. The film ends with Chow performing while his new twins and his family are in the audience.

== Cast ==
- Mark Lee as Chow Chee Beng
- Jaspers Lai as Money
- Kiwebaby Chang as Pearl
- Kenneth Chia as Tiny
- Darius Tan as Italy
- Henry Thia as Fa Ge
- Cassandra See as Teo Chew Phoenix
- Gina Tan as Marie
- Estovan Reizo Cheah as Mason
- Emily Ho as Jocelyn
- Gadrick Chin as Unicorn
- Caryn Cheng as Judy
- Maxi Lim as Military Police Officer 1
- Charlie Goh as Military Police Officer 2

== Production ==
Jaspers Lai contributes the original story and is one of the screenwriters. Mark Lee is the second Singaporean actor to be nominated in the Best Leading Actor category at Golden Horse Awards, after Gurmit Singh for Just Follow Law in 2007.

== Accolades ==
Award	Date of ceremony	Category	Recipients	Result	Ref.
57th Golden Horse Awards	21 November 2020	Best Leading Actor	Mark Lee	Nominated	
57th Golden Horse Awards	21 November 2020	Best Costume & Makeup Design	Raymond Kuek, Azni Samdin	Won	

== Sequel ==
Filming of the sequel recently wrapped in early August 2023. Filming locations took place in Thailand. Reports show that most of the cast members will be back to reprise their roles, including Henry Thia and Cassandra See. Kenneth Chia isn't reprising his role as Tiny, with Gadrick Chin taking over his place and reprising his role as Unicorn. Plus, Seth Ang and Caryn Cheng didn't reprise their roles of Simon and Judy respectively. The title of the sequel is known as Number 2, which was released during the Chinese New Year period in 2025.
