= Filial Party =

- Directed by: Boris Boo
- Starring: Christopher Lee; Mark Lee; Ann Kok; Hayley Woo; Irene Ang; Guo Liang; Richard Low; Liu Lingling; Kym Ng; Jimmy Taenaka
- Production company: Clover Films
- Distributed by: mm2 Entertainment
- Release date: 8 May 2014
- Running time: 110 minutes
- Country: Singapore
- Language: Mandarin

Filial Party (Chinese: 我是孝子) is a 2014 Singaporean comedy-drama film directed by Boris Boo, starring Christopher Lee, Mark Lee, Ann Kok and Hayley Woo.

== Cast ==
- Christopher Lee as Peh Ah Beng
- Mark Lee as Liu Bai Wan
- Ann Kok as Woo Yishuang
- Hayley Woo as Yoona Zhuang
- Irene Ang as Felicia Chin
- Guo Liang as Yoona's Father
- Richard Low as Ah Beng's Father
- Liu Lingling as Ah Beng's Mother
- Kym Ng as Ah Beng's Wife
- Jimmy Taenaka as Patrick
- Ah Niu as Ho Kang
- Mindee Ong as Chen Ruiling
- Youyi as Julia
- Dawn Yeoh
- Andrew Lua
- David Bala as Indian Neighbour
- Tay Yin Yin as Liu's Production Assistant
- Ivan Lo Kai Jun as Elliott
- Chua Cheng Pou as Contestant
- Benjamin Heng as Director

== Release ==
The film opened in theatres on 8 May 2014. The film was a box office failure.

== Reception ==
Laetitia Wong of Today rated the film 4 stars out of 5 and wrote: "Thanks to a riveting storyline and a subject we can all identify with, Filial Party is heart-warming and an adorably comedic outing for Boris Boo." Li Yiyun of the Lianhe Zaobao gave the film 3.5 stars out of 5 for entertainment and 2 stars out of 5 for artistry. Hong Menyan, also of the Lianhe Zaobao, wrote a positive review of the film.

Jocelyn Lee of The New Paper called the film a "refreshing take on filial piety bound to tug at your heartstrings." Yip Wai Yee of The Straits Times rated the film 2 stars out of 5 and wrote: "When even an A-list actor such as Christopher Lee has to wander around naked to milk laughs, you know the movie itself does not have a stitch of credibility."
