= What! The Heist =

2023 Malaysian-Singaporean action comedy film

- Poster
- Mandarin: 发财联盟
- Directed by: Matt Lai
- Starring: Mark Lee; Jack Lim; Patricia Mok; Henry Thia; Jaspers Lai
- Production companies: Asia Tropical Films; The Film Engine
- Distributed by: GSC Movies
- Release dates: 19 January 2023 (Malaysia, Singapore)
- Running time: 1 hour 45 minutes
- Countries: Malaysia, Singapore
- Language: Mandarin

What! The Heist (Chinese: 发财联盟) is a 2023 Malaysian-Singaporean action comedy film. The film revolves around a team of con artists completing a lottery heist mission, as they aims to manipulate the national lottery and win the $100 million jackpot prize.

The film stars an ensemble cast of Mark Lee, Jack Lim, Patricia Mok, Henry Thia, Jaspers Lai, Gan Mei Yan, Hao Ren, Ahirine Ahirudin, Yuan Teng and Grace Teo. It is directed by Matt Lai.

The film is released on 19 January 2023 in cinemas in Malaysia and Singapore. It is one of the four 2023 Malaysian and Singaporean Chinese New Year films, including Ma, I Love You, Little Sunshine (Malaysia), and The King of Musang King (Singapore-Malaysia).

== Synopsis ==
A criminal named 'Godfather' broke out of jail and is assigned by a powerful gangster lord 'Big Boss', in order to complete a mission titled "Lottery Heist", to steal a $100 million lottery grand prize. After recruiting an actor and other con artists, they begin to execute their grand plan. The plan is to enter the lottery company, swap out lotto balls and modify the lottery machine, to win the jackpot, a grand prize worth $100 million. But it soon comes to light that Big Boss plans to kill everyone involved once the mission is completed. Godfather and his new recruits now must plot to save their lives while keeping the money for themselves. How will the heist go?

== Cast ==
- Mark Lee, as Chao Yan Fatt, seasoned actor
- Jack Lim as Choy Gor, "Godfather"
- Patricia Mok as Ah Hua
- Henry Thia as Big Boss
- Jaspers Lai
- Gan Mei Yan
- Hao Ren
- Ahirine Ahirudin
- Yuan Teng
- Grace Teo

== Release ==
The film is a joint production between Malaysia and Singapore. It is directed by Matt Lai, whose previous films include Juang (2022) and Fight Lah! Kopitiam (2020). The film is co-produced by Mark Lee and Jack Lim, through Mark Lee's company King Kong Media Production.

The film stars several Singaporean and Malaysian household veteran comedy actors such as Mark Lee, Henry Thia, Jack Lim, Jaspers Lai, Patricia Mok. The film showcases heist and lottery culture in Malaysia and Singapore.
