= Chen Shucheng =

Singaporean actor and host (born 1949)

- Born: Tan Soo Seng; 21 October 1949 (age 76); Shantou, Guangdong, China
- Occupations: Actor; host
- Years active: 1971−present
- Spouses: C N Lim (m. 1970; div. 1991): Huang Peiru
- Children: 1
- Awards: Full list

Chinese name
- Traditional Chinese: 陳澍城
- Simplified Chinese: 陈澍城
- Hanyu Pinyin: Chén Shùchéng

Chen Shucheng (born Tan Soo Seng on 21 October 1949) is a Singaporean actor and television host. He is one of Mediacorp's few artistes still active from the "black and white TV" era.

== Career ==
=== Acting ===
Chen joined Mediacorp, then known as Radio Television Singapore (RTS), as an actor in 1971. Since then he has portrayed many different roles ranging from a young nerdy doctor in The Awakening, a rich flirting playboy in Pretty Faces, the famous philanthropist, Tan Kah Kee in the war drama, The Price of Peace to a strict and unbending father in Love at 0°C .

Chen's work was recognised in 2007 when he was awarded the "Evergreen Veteran" award at the Star Awards 2007 anniversary special. After being nominated many times, he won his first acting award in Star Awards 2012 for his role in The Oath and received a standing ovation from both colleagues and fans. In Star Awards 2018, he was nominated for Best Supporting Actor for the drama, Home Truly .

Chen has gotten 2 out of 10 Top 10 Most Popular Male Artistes in 2019 and 2021 respectively.

=== Hosting ===
In 1994, Chen hosted the inaugural Star Awards with Taiwanese television host Yvette Tsui.

During the late 1990s, Chen was best known as host of long-running variety shows Econ Nite (宜康之夜) and Weekend Delight (欢乐周末夜) for over a decade.

=== Singing ===
He also had an album to his name in the 1970s. He sang in the Teochew dialect.

== Personal life ==
Chen and former actress Huang Peiru acted as a couple in the 1984 television series The Awakening and married after the drama aired. Chen and Huang had also starred in the series Enchanted Eyes.

Chen previously had a 21-year marriage with C N Lim, which ended in 1991. Lim filed for divorce from Chen and had claimed that the actor had been ignoring her since 1979. Lim has the custody of their daughter.

== Filmography ==
=== Film ===
Year	English title	Mandarin title	Role	Notes	Ref.
2000	2000 AD	公元2000			
2005	The Maid	女佣	Mr. Teo		
2008	A Promise		Old Mo		
2011	It's a Great, Great World	大世界	Towkay Lim		
2011	The Ultimate Winner	赢家	Uncle Lim		
2013	Red Numbers	红字			

=== Television series ===
Year	Title	Role	Notes	Ref.
1971	The Trap			
1971	Autumn			
1971	Return of the Wild Goose			
1971	Parasite			
1972	The Story of Mr. Q			
1972	The World of Warmth			
1972	Repentance			
1972	Distress			
1972	Culprit			
1972	The Test			
1972	Silent Blessings			
1972	Survival			
1972	An Ill-Fated Girl			
1972	The Underground			
1972	Home Coming			
1983	Double Blessings			
1984	The Awakening			
1990	Pretty Faces			
1993	The Unbeatables I			
1994	Crazy Duet			
1995	The Teochew Family			
1995	Dream Hunters			
1995	Project B			
1995	Golden Pillow			
1996	Three In One Love			
1996	The Unbeatables II			
1997	The Silver Lining			
1997	The Price of Peace			
1998	The Return of the Condor Heroes			
1999	PI Blues			
2002	The Unbeatables III			
2003	Viva La Famille	Sun Yongshun		
2003	Holland V	Steven Seow		
2004	Room in My Heart			
2005	Portrait of Home	Zhou Dong		
2005	Portrait of Home	Zhang Guangyang		
2005	Portrait of Home II	Zhou Dong		
2005	Portrait of Home II	Zhang Guangyang		
2006	Love at 0°C	Hu Zhitao		
2006	Women of Times	Chen Tianfa		
2007	Live Again	Zhang Bo		
2007	The Greatest Love of All	Zhao Zhipeng		
2008	Taste of Love	Qiang Ge		
2008	Love Blossoms	Tao Dashun		
2008	Love Blossoms II	Tao Dashun		
2008	A Promise			
2009	The Ultimatum	Ye Songnian		
2009	Your Hand In Mine	Jason Fang		
2010	Happy Family	Dong Jianye		
2010	With You	Zhang Yongsheng		
2011	Secrets for Sale	Chen Daohai		
2011	Devotion	Zhuo Chensheng		
2011	The Oath	Wu Zhixiong		
2012	Double Bonus	Jin Wentao		
2012	Pillow Talk	He Guangming		
2012	Yours Fatefully	Su Shuntian		
2012	Game Plan	Pu Chengcai		
2014	Yes We Can!	Zhu Haitao		
2014	In The Name Of Love	Bai Yongchun		
2014	Blessings	Lian Mengyong		
2014	Spice Up	Cai Shi		
2015	Good Luck	Lin Xiaohe		
2015	Let It Go	Little Bee		
2015	Life Is Beautiful	Cai Qingde		
2015	Super Senior	Chen Yalai		
2016	Life - Fear Not	Zhuang Shuiqing		
2016	Fire Up	Zhuang Dexian		
2017	Home Truly	Hong Shan		
2017	Eat Already? 2	Yuan Yongming		
2017	Have A Little Faith	Zhou Fangdong		
2017	Eat Already? 3	Yuan Yongming		
2018	Eat Already? 4	Yuan Yongming		
2018	Reach For The Skies	Fang Shouyi		
2018	A Million Dollar Dream	Hu Tianhao		
2018	Love At Cavenagh Bridge	Wang Weiguang		
2018	Blessings 2	Lian Mengyong		
2018	Heart To Heart	Yue Dazhong		
2019	How Are You?	Mr Ng		
2019	Hello From The Other Side - Its Time	Grandpa		
2019	Hello Miss Driver	Fang Yuancheng		
2019	Old Is Gold	Zhou Renfa		
2019	Old Is Gold: The Bliss Keeper	Zhou Renfa	Telemovie	
2020	A Jungle Survivor	He Guozhong		
2021	Old Soul Yet So Young	Li Youcai		
2021	Watch Out! Alexius	Sun Jinfa		
2021	The Peculiar Pawnbroker	Chen Hongyi		
2021	The Heartland Hero	Uncle Tan		
2022	I Want To Be A Towkay	Kam Chek		
2022	When Duty Calls 2	Zeng Hechang		
2023	Silent Walls	Liang Zhiqin		
2023	Shero	Huang Yudai	Cameo	
2023	My One and Only	Yang		

== Discography ==
=== Compilation albums ===
Year	English title	Mandarin title
2014	MediaCorp Music Lunar New Year Album 14	新传媒群星金马献万福
2015	MediaCorp Music Lunar New Year Album 15	新传媒群星金羊添吉祥
2016	MediaCorp Music Lunar New Year Album 16	新传媒群星金猴添喜庆
2017	MediaCorp Music Lunar New Year Album 17	新传媒群星咕鸡咕鸡庆丰年
2020	MediaCorp Music Lunar New Year Album 20	裕鼠鼠纳福迎春了

== Awards and nominations ==
Year	Ceremony	Category	Nominated work	Result	Ref
1995	Star Awards	Best Supporting Actor	Strange Encounters	Nominated	
1997	Star Awards	Best Supporting Actor	The Price of Peace	Nominated	
2000	Star Awards	Best Variety Show Host	PSC Night	Nominated	
2001	Star Awards	Best Supporting Actor	Beyond the Axis of Truth	Nominated	
2001	Star Awards	Top 10 Most Popular Male Artistes	—N/a	Nominated	
2001	Star Awards	Best Variety Show Host	Weekend Delight	Nominated	
2002	Star Awards	Special Achievement Award	—N/a	Won	
2002	Star Awards	Top 10 Most Popular Male Artistes	—N/a	Nominated	
2002	Star Awards	Best Actor	Viva Le Famille	Nominated	
2002	Star Awards	Best Supporting Actor	The Wing of Desire	Nominated	
2003	Star Awards	Top 10 Most Popular Male Artistes	—N/a	Nominated	
2004	Star Awards	Best Supporting Actor	Room in My Heart	Nominated	
2005	Star Awards	Top 10 Most Popular Male Artistes	—N/a	Nominated	
2006	Star Awards	Top 10 Most Popular Male Artistes	—N/a	Nominated	
2007	Star Awards	Evergreen Veteran Award	—N/a	Won	
2009	Star Awards	Top 10 Most Popular Male Artistes	—N/a	Nominated	
2010	Asian Television Awards	Best Supporting Actor	With You	Nominated	
2010	Star Awards	Top 10 Most Popular Male Artistes	—N/a	Nominated	
2011	Star Awards	Top 10 Most Popular Male Artistes	—N/a	Nominated	
2012	Star Awards	Top 10 Most Popular Male Artistes	—N/a	Nominated	
2012	Star Awards	Best Supporting Actor	The Oath	Won	
2013	Star Awards	Top 10 Most Popular Male Artistes	—N/a	Nominated	
2014	Star Awards	Top 10 Most Popular Male Artistes	—N/a	Nominated	
2015	Star Awards	Top 10 Most Popular Male Artistes	—N/a	Nominated	
2015	Star Awards	Best Supporting Actor	Blessings	Nominated	
2016	Star Awards	Best Evergreen Artiste	Super Senior	Won	
2016	Star Awards	Top 10 Most Popular Male Artistes	—N/a	Nominated	
2017	Star Awards	Best Supporting Actor	Fire Up	Nominated	
2017	Star Awards	Best Evergreen Artiste	Fire Up	Nominated	
2017	Star Awards	Top 10 Most Popular Male Artistes	—N/a	Nominated	
2018	Star Awards	Best Supporting Actor	Home Truly	Nominated	
2018	Star Awards	Best Evergreen Artiste	—N/a	Won	
2018	Star Awards	Top 10 Most Popular Male Artistes	—N/a	Nominated	
2019	Asian Academy Creative Awards	Best Supporting Actor	Hello From The Other Side - Its Time	Won	
2019	Star Awards	Best Supporting Actor	A Million Dollar Dream	Won	
2019	Star Awards	Top 10 Most Popular Male Artistes	—N/a	Won	
2021	Star Awards	Best Supporting Actor	Old is Gold	Nominated	
2021	Star Awards	Best Evergreen Artiste	—N/a	Nominated	
2021	Star Awards	Top 10 Most Popular Male Artistes	—N/a	Won	
2022	Star Awards	Best Evergreen Artiste	—N/a	Nominated	
2022	Star Awards	Top 10 Most Popular Male Artistes	—N/a	Nominated	
2023	Star Awards	Best Evergreen Artiste	—N/a	Nominated	
2023	Star Awards	Top 10 Most Popular Male Artistes	—N/a	Nominated	
2024	Star Awards	Best Programme Host	Foodie Trio 三吃客	Nominated	
2024	Star Awards	Top 10 Most Popular Male Artistes	—N/a	Nominated	
2025	Star Awards	Best Supporting Actor	Unforgivable 不可饶恕的罪恶	Nominated	
2025	Star Awards	Top 10 Most Popular Male Artistes	—N/a	Nominated	
