= Happy Can Already! 2 =

Singapore dialect variety show

- Season 2
- Starring: Jack Neo; Mark Lee; Henry Thia; Wang Lei; Benjamin Josiah Tan; Jaspers Lai
- No. of episodes: 10

Release
- Original network: Mediacorp Channel 8
- Original release: 19 May – 21 July 2017

Season chronology
- ← Previous; Happy Can Already! Next → Happy Can Already! 3

Happy Can Already! 2 (Chinese: 欢喜就好2) is a Singapore dialect variety series which is telecast on Singapore's free-to-air channel, Mediacorp Channel 8. It stars Jack Neo, Mark Lee, Henry Thia, Wang Lei, Benjamin Josiah Tan, and Jaspers Lai as the casts of the second installment. Happy Can Already! 2 aired from 19 May 2017 to 21 July 2017, every Friday from 11:30am to 12:30pm.

== Plot ==
Liang Xi Mei (Jack Neo) will be reacquainted with Lion King (Henry Thia) and Merlion King (Jaspers Lai), as the former has been released from prison and they turn out to be her new neighbours. Her eldest son Robert (Mark Lee) is still married to Mary (Chua Lee Lian, but she is absent in this season) and they have a daughter Ah Girl (Toh Xin Hui). Her second son Albert (Benjamin Josiah Tan) is now in university.

== Cast ==
=== Liang (Xi Mei) family ===
Cast	Character	Description	Episodes Appeared
Henry Thia	Ah Gong	Liang Xi Mei's father-in-law; Robert and Albert's grandfather; Mary's grandfather-in-law; Ah Girl's great-grandfather	3-9
Jack Neo	Liang Xi Mei	Robert and Albert's mother; Mary's mother-in-law; Ah Girl's grandmother; Ah Gong's daughter-in-law; Merlion King & Lion King's neighbour	1-10
Mark Lee	Robert	Liang Xi Mei's elder son; Albert's older brother; Mary's husband; Ah Girl's father; Ah Gong's elder grandson	1-10
Benjamin Josiah Tan	Albert	Liang Xi Mei's younger son; Mary's brother-in-law; Ah Girl's uncle; Ah Gong's younger grandson; Robert's younger brother	1-10
Toh Xin Hui	Ah Girl	Robert and Mary's daughter; Ah Gong's great-granddaughter; Liang Xi Mei's granddaughter; Albert's niece	1, 10

=== Lion King family ===
Cast	Character	Description	Episodes Appeared
Henry Thia	Lion King	Friend of Robert; Merlion King's father; Neighbour of Liang Xi Mei	1-2, 10
Jaspers Lai	Merlion King	Friend of Robert; Lion King's son; Neighbour of Liang Xi Mei	1-2, 6-8, 10

=== Other characters ===
Cast	Character	Description	Episodes Appeared
Wang Lei	Cantonese Granny	Neighbour of Liang Xi Mei	1, 4, 7-10

=== Cameo appearance ===
Cast	Character	Description	Episodes Appeared
Chen Tianwen	Mr. Unbelievable	Liang Xi Mei's old schoolmate	2
Marcus Chin	Facebook Friend; FB	Framed Liang Xi Mei; Suffered from Mental Illness; Arrested	3
Marcus Chin	Burglar		10
Xiang Yun	Madam Yun Xiang	Ah Gong's computer teacher	3
Patricia Mok	Juliet	Veterinarian who treated Ah Gong; Invited by Cantonese Granny	4
Patricia Mok	Burglar		10
Dennis Chew	Aunty Lucy	Reprised his role from Paris and Milan	5
Baey Yam Keng	Himself	Introduced ActiveSG schemes and participated in exercises	5
Michelle Hsieh	Herself	Taught Liang Xi Mei's family how to conserve water	6
Leon Lim	Crystal Prince	Tried to con Liang Xi Mei to buy his crystals	8
Leon Lim	Security Guard		10
Anna Lin Ruping	Aunt	Liang Xi Mei's sister-in-law; Ah Gong's daughter; Robert and Albert's aunt; Ah Girl's great-aunt; Mary's aunt-in-law	9

== Guest performers ==
Episode no.	Performer(s)	Song(s) performed
2	Marcus Chin	Odyssey (流浪到淡水); I'm Chinese (我是中国人)
3	Michelle Tay	Wife (家后)
3	Babes In the City	Parents' Heart (父母的心声)
4	Choo Lili	From the Heart of a Loafer (浪子心声)
4	Xie Jinshi	I Ask Heaven (我问天)
5	Freddie Ng	Mother Is Just A Name (Mother你只是一个名); A Million Dollars (一百万)
6	Michelle Hsieh	People life, ocean wind (海海人生); Love Cha-cha (爱情恰恰)
7	Desmond Ng	Grandma's Words (阿嬷的话)
8	Chng Shyue Chung	Number One In The World (世界第一等); Looking At The Moon And Thinking Of My Lover (望月想爱人)
9	Roy Li	Husband And Wife (老公老婆); Deeply In Love With You (深爱着你)
10	Patricia Mok	Ah Lian Ah Huay (阿莲阿花)

== Development ==
The first installment of Happy Can Already! attracted more than 200,000 viewers, with more than 80 percent of the elderly finding the show entertaining and informative. Many called for the show to be continued when it ended its run on 3 February 2017.

After the overwhelming response to the first season, MediaCorp and J Team, in collaboration with local director Jack Neo and the Ministry of Communications and Information decided to produce a second season.

== Music ==
Song title	Song type	Lyrics	Composer	Performer	Producer
欢喜就好啦	Opening theme song	Jack Neo	邓碧源	Jack Neo	麦如丽

== See also ==
- Happy Can Already!
- List of variety and infotainment programmes broadcast by MediaCorp Channel 8
