= Ben Yeo =

Singaporean host and actor (born 1978)

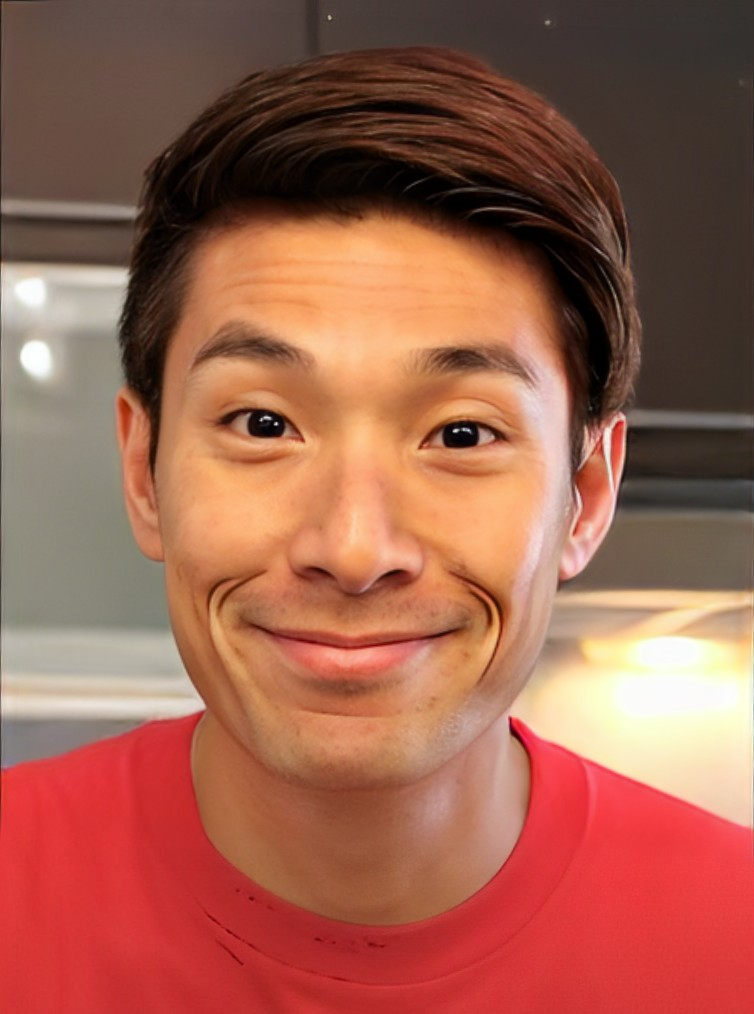
- Yeo in October 2017
- Born: Ben Yeo Chi Lung; 23 September 1978 (age 48); Singapore
- Other name: Yang Zhilong
- Occupations: Television host; actor; businessman; model
- Spouse: Claudia Cheong (m. 2006)
- Children: 2
- Awards: Full list

Chinese name
- Traditional Chinese: 楊志龍
- Simplified Chinese: 杨志龙
- Hanyu Pinyin: Yáng Zhìlóng

Ben Yeo Chi Lung (born 23 September 1978) is a Singaporean television host, actor and businessman.

== Career ==
A former model, Yeo was first scouted on Snap, SPH MediaWorks Channel U's talent show. He won the competition and was signed by SPH MediaWorks. He started his media career as a host. When MediaWorks merged with MediaCorp in 2005, he was one of a number of artistes who transferred over. After the transfer, Yeo made his acting debut in the same year.

Yeo has won three Star Awards for Top 10 Most Popular Male Artistes − in 2012, 2017 and 2022.

== Ventures ==
Outside of acting, Yeo is a passionate cook who regularly posts livestreams of his cooking on his Facebook page. He has also opened a number of eateries and restaurants, with his first venture dating back to 2013. In an article dated November 2022, it reported that Yeo "opens [his] 5th eatery in 2 years, say[ing] it's 'business as usual' for him even if recession happens".

On 22 September 2023, Yeo opened the hawker stall Tan Xiang Fish Soup in a Toa Payoh coffeeshop.

== Personal life ==
Yeo married Claudia Cheong in 2006 at age 28. They have two sons.

== Filmography ==
=== Television series ===
Year	Title	Role	Notes	Ref.
2005	Yummy Yummy	Terry		
2006	Measure of Man	Cai Shengen		
2007	The Peak	Lu Ka		
2007	Happily Ever After	Zhu Wanjin		
2008	Love Blossoms	Wang Zhigang		
2012	Rescue 995	Nimo		
2012	Don't Stop Believin'	Cui Dabao		
2012	Poetic Justice	Adam		
2013	C.L.I.F. 2	Wu Keqiang		
2014	In The Name of Love	Wang Jiashu		
2015	Hand in Hand	Zhong Renyi		
2015	Life - Fear Not	Cui Dabao		
2016	Peace & Prosperity	Bryan		
2018	Die Die Also Must Serve (战备好兄弟)	Zheng Weiming		
2018	Mind Matters	Chen Weiyi		
2018	Babies on Board	Yang Yihao		
2019	Hello From The Other Side (阴错阳差)	Xiao Bai		
2021	The Peculiar Pawnbroker (人心鉴定师)	Raphael		
2022	Your World in Mine (你的世界我们懂)	Hong Maoqiao		
2022	When Duty Calls 2 (卫国先锋2)	Liu Zhanyao		
2023	The Sky is Still Blue (从零开始)	Liu Zhongye		

=== Variety show hosting ===
Year	Title	Notes	Ref.
2023	Curious City 2		
2019	The Destined One 众里寻一	Guest Matchmaker	
2013	Mat Yoyo (Season 2) 优优猫 2		
2013	Finding U 寻U先锋		
2012	Channel 8 30th Anniversary Roadshow		
2012	Golden Age Talentime 黄金年华之斗歌竞艺		
2012	Snap		
2012	Living The Golden Age 黄金年华之光辉岁月		
2012	Quaint 小镇风情		
2012	Microsoft - Bring IT Home Microsoft食在必行一家亲		
2011	ComChest True Hearts Show 2011 公益献爱心2011		
2011	Footprints in Asia 大脚印II		
2011	I Cook For You II 名厨上菜2		
2010	I Am Boss 创业我最行		
2010	The News Trumpet 大小喇叭看时事		
2010	Home Makeover 玩家万岁		
2010	Wedding 101 花月佳期		
2010	Guardian Queenz Guardian玩美女人		
2010	Fashion Ambush 全民时尚你最型		
2010	LNY Eve Special 2010 普天同庆金虎年		
2010	Footprints in Malaysia 大脚印		
2010	Hair Challenge V 护发动员101 V		
2010	Go YOG! 艺起青奥		
2010	Black Rose 爆料黑玫瑰	Regular guest	
2009	Stars for a Cause 明星志工队		
2009	Ben Yeo’s Kitchen x Jim Beam Tis		
2009	Hair Challenge IV 护发动员101 IV		
2009	Paris and Milan 女王本色		
2009	My Yummy Lunchbox II 我的超级便当2		
2009	Hair Challenge III 护发动员101 III		
2009	LNY Eve Special 2009 牛转乾坤喜临门		
2009	King of Thrift III Smart 省钱王3		
2008	Channel 8 45th Anniversary Gala 新传媒45周年台庆	Guest performer	
2008	King of Thrift II Smart省钱王2		
2008	THK Charity Show 2008 一心一德为善乐		
2008	Food Apprentice 我的食习日记		
2008	Food Mania 料理也疯狂		
2008	Hair Challenge 护发挑战101		
2008	LNY Eve Special 2008 八方祥瑞鼠来宝		
2007	Code Red 爱上小红点		
2007	Ren Ci Charity Show 2007 仁心慈爱照万千		
2007	My Yummy Lunchbox 超级便当		
2007	King of Thrift Smart省钱王		
2007	Wonder Baby 无敌宝宝斗斗乐		
2007	Super Savers 省省赢家赢新年		
2006	It's Showtime 全民创意争霸赛	Nominated - Best Variety Show Host, Star Awards 2006	
2006	On the Beat 都市大发现		
2006	Weekend Escapade 周末万岁		
2005	World Cyber Games 2005		
2005	Football Tic Tac Goal 食在好球		
2005	Man Enough 男人本色		
2004	$2 Wonderfood 食在好便宜		
2004	Mall & More 夺宝三响炮		
2004	SWAP FUN回过去		
2004	Mission Possible 地球无界线		
2003	The XXXtraordinaires 少见多怪		
2003	Precious Homes 家有宝贝		
2003	Star Struck II 职场大明星II		
2003	Oooh 元气大搜查		
2002	Star Struck 职场大明星		
2002	Happy Rules 开心就好		

== Awards and nominations ==
Organisation	Year	Category	Nominated work	Result	Ref
Star Awards	2006	Best Variety Show Host	It's Showtime!	Nominated	
Star Awards	2011	Top 10 Most Popular Male Artistes	—N/a	Nominated	
Star Awards	2012	Top 10 Most Popular Male Artistes	—N/a	Won	
Star Awards	2015	Best Variety Show Host	Finding 8	Nominated	
Star Awards	2015	Best Info-ed Programme Show Host	Meet My Family 2	Nominated	
Star Awards	2017	Top 10 Most Popular Male Artistes	—N/a	Won	
Star Awards	2022	Top 10 Most Popular Male Artistes	—N/a	Won	
Star Awards	2023	Top 10 Most Popular Male Artistes	—N/a	Nominated	
Star Awards	2024	Top 10 Most Popular Male Artistes	—N/a	Nominated	
Star Awards	2025	Top 10 Most Popular Male Artistes	—N/a	Nominated	
