= Happy Can Already! 3 =

- Season 3
- Starring: Jack Neo; Mark Lee; Henry Thia; Wang Lei; Benjamin Josiah Tan; Jaspers Lai
- No. of episodes: 10 + 1 Special Ep

Release
- Original network: Mediacorp Channel 8
- Original release: 24 November 2017 – 2 February 2018

Season chronology
- ← Previous; Happy Can Already! 2 Next → Happy Can Already! 4

Happy Can Already! 3 (Chinese: 欢喜就好3) is a Singapore dialect variety series which is telecast on Singapore's free-to-air channel, Mediacorp Channel 8. It stars Jack Neo, Mark Lee, Henry Thia, Wang Lei, Benjamin Josiah Tan, and Jaspers Lai. It is broadcast every Friday from 11.30am to 12.30pm.

== Cast ==
=== Liang Xi Mei Public Court ===
- Jack Neo as Liang Xi Mei. Liang played multiple roles at the court as Judge, Prosecutor and Defendant in different episodes
- Leon Lim as Gong Shuang, the Judge's assistant
- Foo Chay Yeow as See Dua Bui. See portrayed mainly as the Court security officer in most episodes and became the judge in one episode
- Hafiz Aziz as Ahmad, a Court security officer
- Hanrey Low, a Court security officer
- Marcus Chin as
  - Gao Youda, the Prosecutor and Defense counsel
  - Wang Baiwan, Cantonese Granny's employer
  - Gong Ang, one of the defendants

Cast	Character	Description
Mark Lee	Ronaldo de Kopi-o	Pockmarked Lawyer: Defense counsel of the family court
Mark Lee	Smartphone	Lao Kor Tong's phone
Mark Lee	Robert	Liang Xi Mei's elder son; Ah Gong's elder grandson; Albert's older brother; Mary's husband; Ah Girl's father; Defendant
Mark Lee	Yao Gui	Plaintiff's ghost witness
Benjamin Josiah Tan	Mr Kong	A teacher at Community Center
Benjamin Josiah Tan	Ah Hee	Works at a Supermarket
Benjamin Josiah Tan	Banknote	Gao Youda's friend; Defendant's witness
Benjamin Josiah Tan	Albert	Liang Xi Mei's younger son; Ah Gong's younger grandson; Plaintiff; Robert's younger brother; Defendant; Mary's brother-in-law; Ah Girl's uncle
Henry Thia	Phua Long Kang	Feng Piao Piao's father
Henry Thia	Lion King	Mr. Unbelievable's neighbour; Merlion King's father; Judge of the family court (eps 7-9)
Henry Thia	Giam Ga Na	Chin Ngiam Buay's husband; Giam Sng Di's younger brother; Giam Ber and Giam Cai's second son; Giam Hu's second elder brother
Henry Thia	Ah Gong	Liang Xi Mei's father-in-law; Robert and Albert's grandfather; Mary's grandfather-in-law; Ah Girl's great-grandfather; Plaintiff; Yao Gui's acquaintance
Henry Thia	Gor Huay	Ah Ma's grandson
Henry Thia	Lao Kor Tong	Smartphone's owner
Jaspers Lai	Jaspers	Gas Delivery person
Jaspers Lai		Plumbing Contractor
Jaspers Lai	Merlion King	Cantonese Granny's godson; Friend of Robert; Lion King's son; Neighbour of Liang Xi Mei; Defendant
Jaspers Lai	Old TV	Defendant's witness
Jaspers Lai	Ah Koon	Plaintiff's witness; Wang Baiwan's employee
Jaspers Lai	Song Zong Kun	Ah Kun: Song Joong-ki's elder brother; Song Zhong's elder son; International distributor; Defendant's witness
Jaspers Lai	Gong Kia	Rascal, Dense Son: Defendant's witness; Gong Ang and Sek Bor's son
Liu Lingling	Feng Piao Piao	Phua Sai Kang: Sues father in first episode
Wang Lei	Seow Cha Bo	Mrs. Unbelievable: Mr. Unbelievable's wife; Used to be called Shui Cha Bo/ Pretty Woman
Wang Lei		Mr. Unbelievable's father; Seow Cha Bo's father-in-law
Wang Lei	Cantonese Granny	Tiny's mother; Merlion King's godmother; Wang Baiwan's personal employee; Defendant's witness
Wang Lei	Ah Ma	Gor Huay's grandmother
Wang Lei	Bai Gook Sian	Wang Lei: Defense counsel of the family court
Chen Tianwen	Mr. Unbelievable	Seow Cha Bo's husband; Lion King's neighbour
Vivian Lai	Chin Ngiam Buay	Giam Ga Na's wife; Giam Sng Di's younger sister-in-law; Giam Ber and Giam Cai's daughter-in-law; Giam Hu's second elder sister-in-law
Tay Yin Yin	Chu Yok Chok	Pork Congee, Tiny: Cantonese Granny's daughter
Toh Xin Hui		Defendant's witness
Toh Xin Hui	Cute Cute Girl	Plaintiff's witness
Toh Xin Hui	Ah Girl	Robert and Mary's daughter; Liang Xi Mei's granddaughter; Ah Gong's great-granddaughter; Albert's niece; Defendant
Michelle Tay		Plaintiff's witness
Jeremy Chan	Television	Lao Kor Tong's television; Plaintiff's witness
Mdm Teo Yoke Lan	Herself	Wonder Woman: Plaintiff's witness
Pan Lingling	Shui Cha Bo	Pretty Lady: Prosecutor of the family court; Ronaldo de Kopi-o's university friend
Anna Lin Ruping	Sek Bor	Se Mo (Lecher), Smart Wife: Plaintiff; Gong Ang's wife; Gong Kia's mother
Chua Lee Lian	Mary	Robert's wife; Liang Xi Mei's daughter-in-law; Ah Girl's mother; Ah Gong's granddaughter-in-law; Albert's sister-in-law; Works as an administrative manager; Defendant

== Guest performers ==
Episode no.	Performer(s)	Song(s) performed
1	Dawn Yip	Shanghai Bund (上海滩)
2	Chen Jianqiang	You Must Bear With It (你着忍耐)
2	Wang Yuqing	My Precious (心头肉)
3	Li Bao En	Rain, Please Answer Me (雨水我问你); Iron Blood and Loyal Heart (铁血丹心)
3	Xie Wen	Rain, Please Answer Me (雨水我问你); Iron Blood and Loyal Heart (铁血丹心)
4	Wang Lei	Father and Son (父子情深); A Little Hanky (一条毛巾仔)
4	Anderene Choo	Father and Son (父子情深); A Little Hanky (一条毛巾仔)
4	Chen Kehui	Father and Son (父子情深); A Little Hanky (一条毛巾仔)
4	Zheng Qiao'er	Father and Son (父子情深); A Little Hanky (一条毛巾仔)
4	Zhu Jiayi	Father and Son (父子情深); A Little Hanky (一条毛巾仔)
5	Ling Xiao	Capriccio (随想曲); Love in Late Autumn (爱在深秋)
6	Yuan Jin	Wife (家后)
6	Toh Xin Hui	Love Cha-cha (爱情恰恰)
7	Anthony Png	Love Is Gone (情已逝); Man's Love, Woman's Heart (男人情女人心)
7	Linda Lim	Love Is Gone (情已逝); Man's Love, Woman's Heart (男人情女人心)
8	Ryan Lian	I Would Take Your Place (甘心替代你)
8	Leon Lim	You Are My Choice (选择你)
8	Im Komei	You Are My Choice (选择你)
9	NoNo	Bottoms Up (干一杯); Railway Station (车站)
10	Hugo Ng	Hard Work Reaps Success (爱拼才会赢)

== Development ==
It is produced by MediaCorp and J Team, in collaboration with local director Jack Neo and the Ministry of Communications and Information.

== Music ==
Song title	Song type	Lyrics	Composer	Performer	Producer
欢喜就好啦	Opening theme song	Jack Neo	邓碧源	Jack Neo	麦如丽

== See also ==
- Happy Can Already!
- Happy Can Already! 2
- List of variety and infotainment programmes broadcast by MediaCorp Channel 8
