= Happy Can Already! =

- Starring: Jack Neo 梁志强; Mark Lee 李国煌; Wang Lei 王雷; Benjamin Josiah Tan 陈俊铭; Chua Lee Lian 蔡礼莲; Jaspers Lai 赖宇涵
- No. of episodes: 11 (including 1 special)

Release
- Original network: Mediacorp Channel 8
- Original release: 2 December 2016 – 3 February 2017

Season chronology
- Next → Happy Can Already! 2

Happy Can Already! (Chinese: 欢喜就好; Pe̍h-ōe-jī: Hoaⁿ‑hí-tō-hó) is a Singaporean Chinese variety series which is telecast on Singapore's free-to-air channel, Mediacorp Channel 8. It stars Jack Neo, Mark Lee, Wang Lei, Benjamin Josiah Tan, Chua Lee Lian, and Jaspers Lai as the casts of the series. Happy Can Already! aired from 2 December 2016 to 3 February 2017, every Friday from 12:00pm to 12:30pm.

Due to the restrictions of the Speak Mandarin Campaign, this series and Eat Already? were the first non-Mandarin Chinese shows produced for local television in more than three decades. Primarily in Singaporean Hokkien, the show targets Singaporean seniors, many of whom still speak non-Mandarin Chinese varieties, including Cantonese and Teochew, at home.

== Plot ==
Liang Xi Mei laments that most of her old friends are not around anymore. Her eldest son Robert is now married to Mary and they have a daughter named Ah Girl. Her second son Albert is now in university, and Lion King has a son called Merlion King, where the former has been thrown in prison for the time being.

Each episode will start with a guest performance and interview, before proceeding to the skit segment. Performers in this program include veteran getai singers such as Liu Lingling and Hao Hao. The skit segments also feature cameo appearances by Aunty Lucy and others.

== Cast ==
- Wang Lei was cast as various characters
  - Ah Gong, Liang Xi Mei's father-in-law
  - Guangdong Ah Ma
  - Elvis Presley
- Jack Neo as Liang Xi Mei (or otherwise known as Cecilia Neo Sai Moi)
- Mark Lee as Robert, Liang Xi Mei's elder son
- Benjamin Josiah Tan as Albert, Liang Xi Mei's younger son
- Chua Lee Lian as Mary, Robert's wife
- Toh Xin Hui as Ah Girl, Robert and Mary's daughter
- Jaspers Lai as Merlion King

=== Cameo appearance ===
- Leon Lim as Con man
- Liu Lingling made two cameo appearances as two different characters, Fat Auntie and Kolianna Lotus
- Amy Khor as Herself (Senior Minister of State with the Ministry of Health)
- Moses Lim as Auntie Keow
- Dennis Chew as Aunty Lucy, reprising his role from Paris and Milan, a Singaporean Chinese comedy-satire variety show
- Kym Ng as Miss Tan, reprising her role from City Beat, a Singaporean Chinese infotainment variety program.
- Aileen Tan as Yankee
- Tay Yin Yin as Tiny

=== Guest performers ===
- Michael Huang
- Liu Lingling
- Angie Lau
- Hao Hao
- Leon Lim
- Febe Huang
- Marcus Chin
- Desmond Ng
- Chee Hong Tat

== Production ==
This 10-episode non-Mandarin Chinese series is produced by MediaCorp and J Team, in collaboration with local director Jack Neo and the Ministry of Communications and Information. Through an entertaining format with informational components such as songs and skits, and using a language which seniors are most familiar with, each half-hour episode will reinforce relevant messages including health promotion, active ageing, retirement adequacy and support schemes for seniors (such as PGP and CHAS).

Production started on 15 November 2016.

The first promotional roadshow was held at Kreta Ayer Square on 14 November 2016 with artistes Jack Neo, Mark Lee, Wang Lei, Benjamin Josiah Tan, Jaspers Lai, and Hao Hao. The second roadshow was held at Block 114 Aljunied Ave 2 on 17 December 2016 with artistes Jack Neo, Dennis Chew, Chua Lee Lian, Jaspers Lai, and Health Minister Gan Kim Yong. The third roadshow was held at Kreta Ayer Square on 10 January 2017 with artistes Jack Neo, Mark Lee, Wang Lei, Dennis Chew, Moses Lim, Benjamin Josiah Tan, and Minister Chee Hong Tat.

== Sequel ==
A second season, Happy Can Already! 2, was produced and released on 19 May 2017.

== Discography ==
Song title	Song type	Lyrics	Composer	Performer	Producer
欢喜就好啦	Opening theme song	Jack Neo	邓碧源	Jack Neo	麦如丽

== Accolades ==
Year	Award	Category	Nominated	Result	Ref
2017	Star Awards	Best Variety Programme	—N/a	Nominated	

== See also ==
- List of variety and infotainment programmes broadcast by MediaCorp Channel 8
- List of MediaCorp Channel 8 Chinese drama series (2010s)
