= Jaspers Lai =

Malaysian actor active in Singapore (born 1987)

- Born: 7 March 1987 (age 39); Kuala Lumpur, Malaysia
- Education: Nanyang Junior College
- Alma mater: National University of Singapore
- Occupations: Actor; host; comedian

Stage name
- Traditional Chinese: 賴宇涵
- Simplified Chinese: 赖宇涵
- Hanyu Pinyin: Lài Yǔhán

Jaspers Lai Yit Hann (born 7 March 1987) is a Malaysian actor and comedian active in Singapore.

== Early life and education ==
Jaspers Lai was born in Kuala Lumpur on 7 March 1987. Lai attended Nanyang Junior College. Thereafter, Lai went to Hong Kong to be trained in acting, hosting, singing and songwriting when he was 18, and was in training for 5 years, along with Romeo Tan and Andie Chen. However, the artiste management company shuttered when he was 23 before he could debut. He returned to Singapore and enrolled into National University of Singapore, studying at the School of Computing.

== Career ==
While studying in NUS, he was a disc jockey for in988, an internet radio station.

In 2014, Lai made his film debut in The Lion Men. In the movie, he was cast as Sam, the leader of a rivalling lion dance troupe and the main villain of the film. He was selected for the role after passing an audition during his final university semester, and was also signed with Jack Neo's J-team Productions. However, acting jobs were scant for Lai, with him filming a movie once a year.

While attending a scriptwriting course, Lai started to develop the script, for what would eventually become the 2020 film Number 1, based on his personal experiences. While developing the script still, his co-actor, Mark Lee found out about the script and immediately staked for a role in the film. After the movie was released in 2020, the film received two nominations at the 57th Golden Horse Awards. It won one award for Best Costume & Makeup Design.

In 2021, Lai received the Most Talented Chinese Artiste Award (最有才华艺人奖) from the World Chinese Economic Forum.

== Personal life ==
According to his profile on J Team Productions, Jack Neo's artiste management company, Lai had obtained Singapore's permanent residency.

== Filmography ==
=== Film ===
Year	Title	Role	Notes	Ref.
2014	The Lion Men	Sam		
2014	The Lion Men: Ultimate Showdown	Sam		
2015	Ah Boys to Men 3: Frogmen	CPL Handsome		
2016	Long Long Time Ago	CPL Handsome	Cameo	
2017	Ah Boys to Men 4	CPL Handsome		
2018	Wonderful! Liang Xi Mei	Merlion King		
2020	Number 1	Money		
2023	What! The Heist	Bao Ya Gu		
2026	Dream Stall	Ah Ji		

=== Television series ===
Year	Title	Role	Notes	Ref
2011	On the Fringe	Xiao-ma		
2015	Tiger Mum	Peter		
2015	The Dream Makers II	Steve Lim		
2021	Mr Kiasu 2.0	Mr Kiasu		
2023	Whatever Will Be, Will Be	Ray		

=== Variety series ===
Year	Title	Role	Notes	Ref
2016	Happy Can Already!			
2017	Happy Can Already! 2			
2017	Happy Can Already! 3			
2018	Happy Can Already! 4			

== Discography ==
=== Singles ===
Year	Title	Album	Notes	Ref
2014	唯一的王	Non-album single	OST for The Lion Men: Ultimate Showdown	
2015	感觉心跳为爱情喝彩 Heartbeat	Non-album single		
