= Yong Jack Hao =

Malaysian actor and content creator

Yong Jack Hao (Chinese: 熊杰豪) is a Malaysian actor and content creator based in Singapore.

== Early life and career ==
Hao began playing badminton as a child and represented a Malaysian state team. At 17, he moved to Singapore, where he worked while continuing his studies. He participated in Jack Neo's competition programme 放马过来 and subsequently joined JTeam Production. His early acting work included the film Ah Girls Go Army and the television drama 熟悉的陌生人.

In June 2023, Hao joined NoonTalk Media. Later that year, he began producing 黑警, a police-themed comedy short-video series that he wrote, directed and acted in. Actor Xu Bin also appeared in the series.

In 2024, Hao played Jensen, the leader of the fictional boy band JET, in the Mediacorp television drama The Blockbusters. It was his first antagonist role.

In 2026, Hao took part in filming the web series 很难 in Bahrain. In March that year, Shin Min Daily News reported on 16号, a five-part suspense microdrama for which he served as writer, director, and lead actor.

== Filmography ==
=== Film ===
- Ah Girls Go Army
- 流氓驱魔师

=== Television ===
- 熟悉的陌生人
- The Blockbusters — Jensen

=== Web series and short productions ===
- 黑警 — writer, director and actor
- 很难 — actor
- 16号 — writer, director and lead actor

== Awards and nominations ==
Ceremony	Year	Category	Result	Ref.
Star Awards	2025	Most Popular Rising Stars	Nominated	
Star Awards	2026	Most Popular Rising Stars	Nominated	
