= Paris and Milan =

- 女王本色
- Genre: Comedy-satire
- Written by: Lim Kar Yee
- Directed by: 梁美珊; Tan Bee Leng 陈美玲
- Starring: Patricia Mok; Michelle Tay; Dennis Chew; Ben Yeo
- Country of origin: Singapore
- Original languages: Mandarin with some Singlish dialogue

Production
- Producers: Lim Kar Yee 林嘉仪; Kang Lay See 江丽丝
- Running time: approx. 30 min

Original release
- Network: MediaCorp Channel 8
- Release: 2 April 2009

Related
- The Noose

Paris and Milan (女王本色) is a Singaporean Chinese comedy-satire variety show which aired on Channel 8 in 2009. Relevant issues such as the 2009 flu pandemic, "choping" and the local education system debates are parodied in the form of skits and scenarios which are fully filmed outdoors.

== Hosts and characters ==
- Patricia Mok as Paris. Mok also acted different characters such as Lily.
- Michelle Tay as Milan. Tay also acted different characters such as Atun, Madam Chin.
- Dennis Chew as Aunty Lucy. He also acted different characters such as Teochew Uncle, Beatrice, Zhou Dudu and also as Miss Ai-Yo-Yo, a parody of Chen Liping's character in the television series Good Morning, Sir!.
- Ben Yeo as an Ah Beng, Wang Meimei and C C Yeo

== Reception ==
=== Critical reception ===
Dennis Chew's character Aunty Lucy was extremely well received by audiences. Previously, Chew was mostly known for being one of YES 933's most popular DJs but the popularity of the character further exposed him to television audiences.

=== Accolades ===
Organisation	Year	Category	Nominee	Result	Ref
Star Awards	2010	Best Variety Show Host	Dennis Chew	Nominated	
Star Awards	2010	Favourite Female Character	Dennis Chew	Nominated	
Star Awards	2010	Favourite Male Character	Dennis Chew	Nominated	
Star Awards	2010	Best Variety Programme		Nominated	
Star Awards	2010	Best Variety Show Writer 最佳综艺剧本	Lim Kar Yee	Won	
