= Mark Lee (Singaporean actor) =

Singaporean comedian (born 1968)

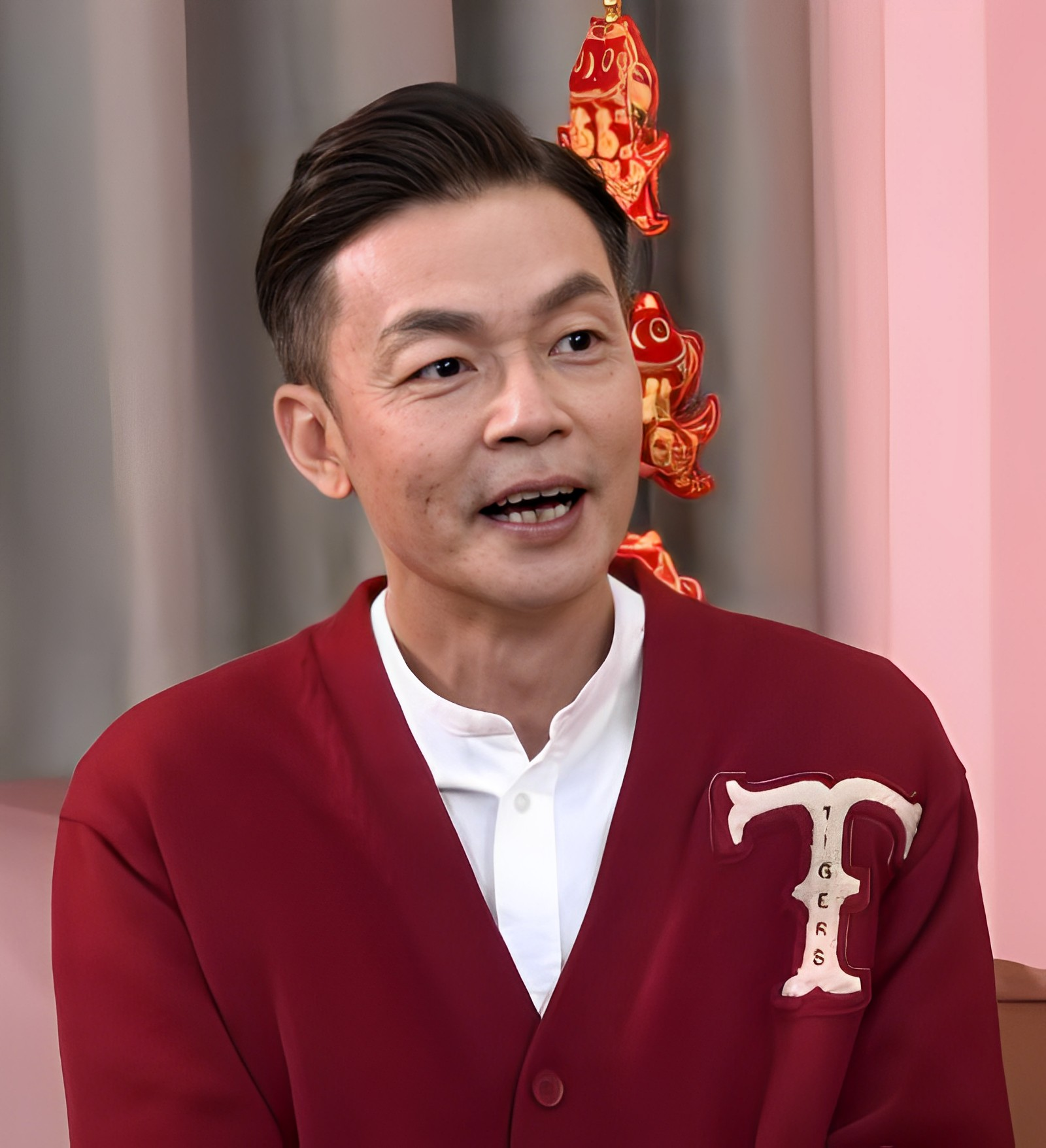
- Lee in 2022
- Born: Mark Lee Kok Huang; 16 October 1968 (age 58); Singapore
- Education: Jurong Secondary School
- Occupations: Actor; Presenter; Comedian; Film director; Film producer
- Years active: 1990−present
- Agents: King Kong Media Production; Galaxy Entertainment; Mediacorp(TCA)
- Spouse: Catherine Ng (m. 1999)
- Children: 3
- Awards: Full list

Chinese name
- Traditional Chinese: 李國煌
- Simplified Chinese: 李国煌
- Hanyu Pinyin: Lǐ Guóhuáng
- Hokkien POJ: Lí Kok-Hông

Mark Lee Kok Huang (Note: Chinese: 李国煌; pinyin: Lǐ Guóhuáng; Pe̍h-ōe-jī: Lí Kok-Hông) (born 16 October 1968) is a Singaporean comedian, actor, presenter, director and producer.

== Early life ==
Mark Lee Kok Huang was born on 16 October 1968. His father was a barber, and his mother was a hawker. His family included an older brother and an older sister. Growing up, Lee helped his mother to sell chee cheong fun in the morning and duck rice in the evening in a kopitiam at Taman Jurong, and rambutan for his father. He studied in Jurong Secondary School, where he worked three jobs during the holidays. He passed his N-Levels but failed his O-Levels.

== Career ==
Lee is mostly known for playing comedic roles. He played the thief in the English sitcom, titled Police & Thief, as Lee Tok Kong, an ah beng character, described as "the last great series of Singapore's sitcom heyday" by Channel NewsAsia's On the Red Dot, having been convinced by the producers to act the role despite initially hesitating over his adequacy in English. Lee's first role was a talking trash bin in the variety show directed by Jack Neo which aired from 1990 to 2003, Comedy Nite, (Note: Chinese: 搞笑行动; pinyin: gǎo xiào xíng dòng) which he believes made him famous. He has also acted in movies, such as with Neo and Henry Thia in Money No Enough and Money No Enough 3, and others such as I Not Stupid and Ah Long Pte Ltd. He made his directorial debut in the comedy horror film The Ghosts Must Be Crazy.

Along with long-time colleague Christopher Lee, he received the All Time Favourite Artiste award in the Star Awards 2010.

In 2012, Lee won his fourth Best Variety Host award for his popular show It's a Small World (Season 2).

In 2020, Lee released Number 1, a dramedy show about the drag world. He played Chow Chee Beng, a retrenched civil engineer and part-time drag queen responsible for supervising drag performers in a night club. He wanted to challenge the idea that he could only act as an ah beng, and thought that the plot of Number 1 was interesting when introduced to it by Jaspers Lai. It received a Golden Horse Award for make-up and costume design in 2020. John Lui of The Straits Times wrote that it was a "giant leap" to combat homophobia and transphobia given that the movie had to appeal to a large crowd of people.

In 2025, Lee released Number 2, a sequel to Number 1, a film that focused on the protagonist's family values and the dynamic with the grown-up son. It was largely filmed in Thailand, described as Asia's "undisputed capital of queer shows" by Tay Yek Keak of AsiaOne. He played the same character in Number 1, Chow Chee Beng. He won the award for the Pioneer Trend Best Actor for his role at the Asian Art Film Awards.

== Business ventures ==
On 9 March 2017, Lee opened a production house named King Kong Media Productions with Yinson Marine Services, a Malaysian oil and gas company. Galaxy Entertainment is a subsidiary of King Kong Media Productions, an artiste management company.

He also co-owns salons with Addy Lee, which ran nine outlets in Singapore and two in Shanghai as of 2013.

Lee also once owned the eatery chain Old Town White Coffee which he brought into Singapore from Malaysia in 2008, and founded the now-defunct chicken rice brand 13 Stages in 2017. In 2021, Lee invested in the Ipoh F&B Chain Nam Heong, which opened its first Singapore outlet at a food court in 313@Somerset mall.

== Music ==
In 2004, Lee released an album, titled Young Hero, which included Mandarin and Hokkien songs. In 2025, he released a Hokkien song, titled My Journey, about his life experiences and reflections. It was dedicated to his wife.

== Personal life ==
Lee married Catherine Ng in 1999. They have two daughters, born in July 2008 and on 19 August 2013, and a son born on 25 August 2011.

== Filmography ==
=== Film ===
Year	Title	Role	Notes	Ref
1998	Money No Enough	Ah Ong		
1998	Hitman in the City	Liu Fei		
1999	Liang Po Po: The Movie	Ah Beng		
1999	Eating Air	Lao Beng		
1999	That One No Enough	Zhu Guo Rong		
2001	One Leg Kicking	Handsome		
2002	I Not Stupid	Singaporean kidnapper		
2003	Homerun	Chew Kiat Kun's P.E. teacher		
2004	The Best Bet	Tan Chun Ong		
2005	I Do, I Do	Acting Loan Shark		
2005	One More Chance	Chin Wuhuang		
2008	Ah Long Pte Ltd	JoJo Fang		
2008	Money No Enough 2	Yang Baohuang		
2009	Where Got Ghost?	Yang Baohuang		
2009	Love Matters			
2010	Being Human	Mai Wei		
2010	Just Call Me Nobody	Dugu Qiu Bai		
2011	Petaling Street Warriors	Shi Duyao		
2011	23:59	Sergeant Kuah		
2011	Twisted			
2011	Homecoming	Daniel Koh		
2011	The Ghosts Must Be Crazy	Ah Hai/Chen Xiaojuan	Also co-director	
2012	Greedy Ghost	Book Spirit	Also executive producer	
2012	Ghost Buddies	Fei		
2013	Judgement Day	Police Officer	Also executive producer	
2013	Taxi! Taxi!	Lee Ah Tau		
2013	Everybody's Business	Winston Lee		
2014	The Bat Night			
2014	Filial Party	Liu Bai Wan		
2014	A Fantastic Ghost Wedding	Master Wong		
2015	King of Mahjong	Wong Tin-ba		
2015	Time is Money	Chu Zhong Tian		
2016	Let's Eat!			
2016	Long Long Time Ago	Lim Ah Kun		
2016	Long Long Time Ago 2	Lim Ah Kun		
2017	The Fortune Handbook	Huat God	Also executive producer	
2018	Wonderful! Liang Xi Mei	Robert		
2018	Lee Chong Wei	Lee Ah Chai		
2018	Ramen Teh	Uncle Wee		
2018	23:59: The Haunting Hour	Master Warrant Officer T G Teo		
2019	Make It Big Big	Himself	Also director	
2020	Number 1	Chow Chee Beng		
2020	The Diam Diam Era	Lim Ah Kun		
2021	The Diam Diam Era Two	Lim Ah Kun		
2022	Reunion Dinner	Wei		
2023	What! The Heist	Chao Yan Fatt		
2023	The King of Musang King	Wang Jin Shui		
2023	Geylang			
2023	Wonderland	Loke		
2024	Money No Enough 3	Li Qing Huang		
2025	Number 2	Chow Chee Beng		
2026	Uncle Odyssey	Sheng		

=== Television series ===
Year	Title	Role	Notes	Ref
1997–1999	Different Cuts, Different Strokes	Lin Meng Shui		
2000	Soho @ Work		Nominated – Best Comedy Performer, Star Awards 2000	
2001	The Hotel	Li Xiao Huang		
2002	Katong Miss Oh	Beng	Best Comedy Performer, Star Awards 2002	
2003	Holland V	Su Hao		
2004–2010	Police & Thief	Lee Tok Kong		
2004	The Best Bet	Chen Jun Huang		
2005	A Promise for Tomorrow	Wilson		
2008	My Classmate Dad	Edison Tay		
2009	Mr & Mrs Kok	Kok Fook Seng		
2010	Carlsberg Telemovie Showcase	Zheng Ah Nan		
2012	Abang Ah Beng	Billy		
2012	Le Bisellahause	Kenny Gan		
2019	How Are You?	Story Teller		
2022	It's All Your Fault!	Boon Bin		

=== Variety show ===
Year	English title	Native title	Notes	Ref
2019	The Destined One		Guest Matchmaker	
2018	Happy Can Already! 4			
2017	Happy Can Already! 3			
2017	Happy Can Already! 2		Robert	
2016	Happy Can Already!		Robert	
2016	Please be My Guest	客人來咯 2		
2014	Super Comedian	搞笑之王	Judge	
2014	Please be My Guest	客人來咯		
2014	Neighbourhood Chef	鄰里厨王		
2013	Home Décor Survivor 5	摆家乐5		
2012–present	BODY SOS	小毛病大问题		
2012	It's a Small World III	国记交意所3		
2012	Men's Talk	3个男人1张口		
2012	Japan Flavour	J Food好吃		
2011	Home Makeover II	玩家万岁2		
2011	Behind Every Job 2	美差事。苦差事2		
2011	It's a Small World II	国记交意所2	Best Variety Show Host, Star Awards 2012	
2010	Home Makeover	玩家万岁		
2010	Don't Forget the Lyrics!		Hosted the Chinese version for an All-Stars Edition	
2010	Gatekeepers		Guest	
2010	Behind Every Job (美差事。苦差事)		Nominated – Best Info-ed Programme Host, Star Awards 2011	
2010	Star Awards 2010		Show 1	
2010	Wonder Chef (我要当食神)			
2009	Home Décor Survivor 4	摆家乐4		
2009	Singapore Flavours	万里香		
2009	Gracious Planet	放心出去看		
2009	It's a Small World	国记交意所	Won – Best Variety Show Host, Star Awards 2010	
2009	Dad @ Home/Family 'Dad @Home	爸爸当家		
2008	Channel 8 45th Anniversary Gala	新传媒45周年台庆	Guest performer	
2008	Home Decor	焕然一新DIY		
2008	Food Hometown	美食寻根		
2007	Home Décor Survivor 3	摆家乐3		
2007	Barter Trade II	物物大交换II		
2007	Say It If You Dare 3	有话好好说3	Best Variety Show Host, Star Awards 2007	
2006	Star Awards 2006		Post-show Party	
2006	Home Décor Survivor 2	摆家乐2		
2006	Say It If You Dare 2	有话好好说2		
2006	Stars, Beat It!	王牌对王牌		
2006	Property Classified	吉屋出售	Nominated – Best Variety Show Host, Star Awards 2006	
2005	KP Club	鸡婆俱乐部	Nominated – Best Comedy Performer, Star Awards 2005	
2005	Home Décor Survivor	摆家乐		
2005	Star Run	跑吧！艺人		
2005	First Date	敢敢来约会		
2004	Say It If You Dare	有话好好说	Nominated – Best Variety Show Host, Star Awards 2005	
2004	Be My Guest	客人来	Best Variety Show Host, Star Awards 2004	
2004	Good Bargain, Good Fun	超值玩乐大搜寻		
2003	Split Ends (兵分两路)			
2002	One Fun Day (惊喜一整天)		Nominated – Best Variety Show Host, Star Awards 2002	
2001	Top Fun (欢乐巅峰)		Nominated – Best Variety Show Host, Star Awards 2001	
1990–2000; 2003-2004; 2006	Comedy Nite (搞笑行动)		Best Comedy Performer, Star Awards 1998; Best Comedy Performer, Star Awards 1999; Best Comedy Performer, Star Awards 2003; Nominated – Best Comedy Performer, Star Awards 2004	

== Awards and nominations ==
Organisation	Year	Category	Nominated work	Result	Ref
Golden Horse Film Festival and Awards	2020	Best Leading Actor	Number 1	Nominated	
Ho Chi Minh International Film Festival	2024	Best Actor	Wonderland	Won	
Asian Art Film Awards	2025	Best Actor	Number 2	Won	
Star Awards	1998	Best Comedy Performer	Comedy Night	Won	
Star Awards	1998	Top 10 Most Popular Male Artistes	—N/a	Won	
Star Awards	1999	Best Comedy Performer	Comedy Night	Won	
Star Awards	1999	Top 10 Most Popular Male Artistes	—N/a	Won	
Star Awards	2000	Best Comedy Performer	Soho@Work	Nominated	
Star Awards	2000	Top 10 Most Popular Male Artistes	—N/a	Nominated	
Star Awards	2001	Best Variety Show Host	Top Gun	Nominated	
Star Awards	2001	Top 10 Most Popular Male Artistes	—N/a	Won	
Star Awards	2002	Best Variety Show Host	One Fun Day	Nominated	
Star Awards	2002	Best Comedy Performer	Katong Ms Oh	Won	
Star Awards	2002	Top 10 Most Popular Male Artistes	—N/a	Won	
Star Awards	2003	Best Comedy Performer	Comedy Night	Won	
Star Awards	2003	Top 10 Most Popular Male Artistes	—N/a	Won	
Star Awards	2004	Best Comedy Performer	Comedy Night	Nominated	
Star Awards	2004	Best Variety Show Host	Be My Guest	Won	
Star Awards	2004	Top 10 Most Popular Male Artistes	—N/a	Won	
Star Awards	2005	Best Variety Show Host	Say It If You Dare 1	Nominated	
Star Awards	2005	Best Comedy Performer	KP Club	Nominated	
Star Awards	2005	Top 10 Most Popular Male Artistes	—N/a	Won	
Star Awards	2006	Best Variety Show Host	Property Classified	Nominated	
Star Awards	2006	Top 10 Most Popular Male Artistes	—N/a	Won	
Star Awards	2007	Best Variety Show Host	Say It If You Dare 3	Won	
Star Awards	2007	Top 10 Most Popular Male Artistes	—N/a	Won	
Star Awards	2009	Top 10 Most Popular Male Artistes	—N/a	Won	
Star Awards	2010	Best Variety Show Host	It's a Small World	Won	
Star Awards	2010	All-Time Favourite Artiste	—N/a	Won	
Star Awards	2011	Best Info-Ed Programme Host	Behind Every Job	Nominated	
Star Awards	2012	Best Info-Ed Programme Host	Behind Every Job	Nominated	
Star Awards	2012	Best Variety Show Host	It's a Small World 2	Won	
Star Awards	2015	Best Variety Show Host	Neighbourhood Chef	Nominated	
Star Awards	2017	Best Speech Delivered	—N/a	Won	
Star Awards	2021	Best Radio Programme	972 Breakfast Quartet	Won	
Star Awards	2022	Best Radio Programme	972 Breakfast Quartet	Won	
Star Awards	2022	Best Combo	Yujian Huangchong (Weekend Edition) 玉建煌崇 （周末版)	Won	
Star Awards	2023	Best Radio Programme	972 Breakfast Quartet	Won	
Star Awards	2024	Best Radio Programme	972 Breakfast Quartet	Won	
Star Awards	2024	Special Achievement Award	—N/a	Won	
