= Marcus Chin =

Singaporean host, actor and singer (born 1953)

- Born: 22 September 1952 (age 73); Singapore
- Other name: Chen Jianbin
- Occupations: Actor; comedian; singer; radio DJ; businessman
- Years active: 1970-present
- Spouse: Murong Ying (m. 1987; sep. 2009)
- Partner: Eileen Cheah (2009−2011)
- Children: 1
- Awards: Full list

Chinese name
- Traditional Chinese: 陳建彬
- Simplified Chinese: 陈建彬
- Hanyu Pinyin: Chén Jiànbīn

Marcus Chin On Kang (born 22 September 1952) is a Singaporean host, actor, comedian, singer, radio DJ, and businessman.

== Career ==
Chin joined the Singapore Broadcasting Corporation during the 1970s. During the 1990s, he was mainly known for starring in comedic roles in the long-running Comedy Nite (搞笑行动) and various shows alongside Jack Neo, Moses Lim, Mark Lee, Henry Thia, John Cheng and Jimmy Nah.

Chin left J-Team with one year remaining on his 10-year contract after he separated with his wife, Murong Ying, to be with then-girlfriend, Eileen Cheah.

Besides acting and singing, Chin works as a deejay on Love 97.2FM, take break in 2025 due to his health.

At the Star Awards 2018, he was nominated for Best Supporting Actor for the drama, Have A Little Faith.

In May 2021, Chin and actress-host Kate Pang opened a Sichuan restaurant named Tian Tian You Yu at 111 Somerset, and later a second outlet located along East Coast Road area.

In April 2023, Chin renewed his contract with Mark Lee's King Kong Media Production. Having signed to the company since its inauguration in 2017 and acknowledging their good working relationship, Chin remarked that it will be a "lifetime" contract.

From 2021 to 2025, Chin won the Star Awards for Top 10 Most Popular Male Artistes.

== Personal life ==
Chin married Taiwanese singer Murong Ying in 1987. They separated after Chin was discovered dating his personal assistant, Eileen Cheah, at that time.

Cheah gave birth to their daughter, Elise, in Malaysia on 18 August 2010.

Chin and Cheah broke up in 2011, a year after their daughter was born. In an interview with 8 Days in 2018, Chin revealed that he is still legally married to Murong Ying and that she still lives in their marital home. According to Chin, a divorce would mean selling their house which would leave his wife homeless. Currently, Chin lives alone in a rented apartment.

In March 2023, Chin revealed that his daughter is diagnosed with epilepsy, and that the condition runs in his family where his brother, his brother's children and grandchildren are being diagnosed as well.

On 7 October 2024, Chin suffered a heart attack during filming with Mark Lee. He was rushed to National University Hospital and underwent a coronary stenting procedure. He was discharged on 10 October. Chin underwent another surgery on 22 October.

== Filmography ==
=== Television series ===
Year	Title	Role	Notes	Ref.
2016	Peace & Prosperity	Huang Yuanhao		
2016	Eat Already?	Ah Shun		
2017	Eat Already? 2	Ah Shun		
2017	Have A Little Faith	Qian Zaide		
2017	Eat Already? 3	Ah Shun		
2018	Eat Already? 4	Ah Shun		
2018	Fifty & Fabulous (五零高手)	Wang Qi		
2019	Voyage of Love (爱。起航)	Guo Dajun		
2019	Old Is Gold (老友万岁)	Phillip Cui Liancheng		
2022	Healing Heroes (医生不是神)	Uncle Heng		
2023	Fix My Life	Mr Xu		
2023	The Sky is Still Blue	Uncle Ben		
2023	I Do, Do I?	Tu Jinsheng		

=== Film ===
Year	Title	Role	Notes	Ref.
2002	I Not Stupid			
2003	Homerun			
2003	City Sharks	Ang		
2004	The Best Bet			
2005	I Do, I Do	Xu Wenbing		
2005	One More Chance	Ong Beng Kuang		
2009	Where Got Ghost?	Shou		
2011	It's a Great, Great World	Ah Chuen (head chef)		
2011	Perfect Rivals			
2012	Dance Dance Dragon	Ah Gui		
2012	The Wedding Diary			
2013	The Wedding Diary 2			
2013	Everybody's Business	Taxi driver		
2014	Rubbers	Ah Niu		
2015	Mr. Unbelievable	Master Lo Man		
2016	Provision Shop	Provision shop owner		
2017	The Fortune Handbook	Intern supervisor		
2019	Make It Big Big	As himself		

=== Variety show ===
Year	Title	Notes	Ref.
2008–2025	Golden Age Talentime (黄金年华之斗歌竞艺)		
2014	Are You Hokkien?		
2017	Happy Can Already! 3	Guest performer	
2018	Happy Can Already! 4	Guest performer	
2019	The Destined One	Guest matchmaker	
2023	Happy Sing-Along	Web series	

== Discography ==
=== Compilation albums ===
Year	English title	Mandarin title
2012	MediaCorp Music Lunar New Year Album 12	新传媒群星金龙接财神
2018	MediaCorp Music Lunar New Year Album 18	新传媒群星阿狗狗过好年
2019	MediaCorp Music Lunar New Year Album 19	新传媒群星猪饱饱欢乐迎肥年
2020	MediaCorp Music Lunar New Year Album 20	新传媒 裕鼠鼠纳福迎春了

== Awards and nominations ==
Organisation	Year	Award	Nominated work	Result	Ref
Star Awards	2004	Best Comedy Performer	Comedy Nite	Won	
Star Awards	2004	Star Awards for Best Variety Show Host	King of Variety	Nominated	
Star Awards	2005	Best Comedy Performer	Comedy Nite	Nominated	
Star Awards	2005	Top 10 Most Popular Male Artistes	—N/a	Nominated	
Star Awards	2006	Top 10 Most Popular Male Artistes	—N/a	Nominated	
Star Awards	2007	Top 10 Most Popular Male Artistes	—N/a	Nominated	
Star Awards	2009	Star Awards for Best Variety Show Host	Golden Age Talentime	Nominated	
Star Awards	2009	Top 10 Most Popular Male Artistes	—N/a	Nominated	
Star Awards	2018	Special Achievement Award	—N/a	Won	
Star Awards	2018	Best Supporting Actor	Have A Little Faith (as Qian Zaide)	Nominated	
Star Awards	2018	Best Evergreen Artiste	Have A Little Faith (as Qian Zaide)	Nominated	
Star Awards	2018	Top 10 Most Popular Male Artistes	—N/a	Nominated	
Star Awards	2019	Best Evergreen Artiste	Fifty & Fabulous (as Wang Qi)	Nominated	
Star Awards	2019	Top 10 Most Popular Male Artistes	Fifty & Fabulous (as Wang Qi)	Nominated	
Star Awards	2021	Best Evergreen Artiste	—N/a	Nominated	
Star Awards	2021	Best Radio Programme	LOVE 972 -The Breakfast Quartet 早安！玉建煌崇	Won	
Star Awards	2021	Top 10 Most Popular Male Artistes	—N/a	Won	
Star Awards	2022	Best Radio Programme	LOVE 972 -The Breakfast Quartet 早安！玉建煌崇	Won	
Star Awards	2022	Perfect Combo	LOVE 972-Yujian Huangchong (Weekend Edition) 玉建煌崇 （周末版）	Won	
Star Awards	2022	Top 10 Most Popular Male Artistes	—N/a	Won	
Star Awards	2023	Best Radio Programme	LOVE 972 -The Breakfast Quartet 早安！玉建煌崇	Won	
Star Awards	2023	Top 10 Most Popular Male Artistes	—N/a	Won	
Star Awards	2024	Best Radio Programme	LOVE 972 -The Breakfast Quartet 早安！玉建蔡煌崇	Won	
Star Awards	2024	Top 10 Most Popular Male Artistes	—N/a	Won	
Star Awards	2025	Best Radio Programme	LOVE 972 -The Breakfast Quartet 早安！玉建煌崇	Nominated	
Star Awards	2025	Top 10 Most Popular Male Artistes	—N/a	Won	
