= Star Awards for Best News/Current Affairs Presenter =

Singaporean television award (2000–2009)

Star Awards for Best News/Current Affairs Presenter 最佳新闻播报／时事主持人
- Awarded for: Best Performance by a MediaCorp Presenter in a News/Current Affairs Programme
- Country: Singapore
- Presented by: MediaCorp
- First award: 2000
- Final award: 2009
- Currently held by: Vacant

The Best News/Current Affairs Presenter was an award presented annually at the Star Awards, a ceremony that was established in 1994.

The category was introduced in 2000, at the 7th Star Awards ceremony; Chun Guek Lay received the award for her performance and it was given in honour of a MediaCorp presenter who has delivered an outstanding performance in a news/current affairs programme. The nominees were determined by a team of judges employed by MediaCorp; winners were selected by a majority vote from the entire judging panel.

Since its inception, the award was given to four presenters. Tung Soo Hua is the most recent and final winner in this category.Tung is also the only presenter to win in this category five times, surpassing Chun who has two wins. Ng Siew Leng was nominated on nine occasions, more than any other presenter. Lin Chi Yuan holds the record for the most nominations without a win, with six.

The award was discontinued from 2010 and separated into two newly formed categories, namely the Best News Presenter and Best Current Affairs Presenter awards, to create distinctions between the news and current affairs presenters.

== Recipients ==
| Year | Presenter | Nominees |
|---|---|---|
| 2000 | Chun Guek Lay 曾月丽 | Carol Chiam 詹玉珍; Chua Ying 蔡萦; Ng Siew Leng 黄秀玲; Zhang Haijie 张海洁 |
| 2001 | Ng Siew Leng 黄秀玲 | Chua Ying 蔡萦; Chun Guek Lay 曾月丽; Tung Soo Hua 董素华; Zhang Haijie 张海洁 |
| 2002 | Chun Guek Lay 曾月丽 | Chew Huoy Min 周慧敏; Chua Ying 蔡萦; Ng Siew Leng 黄秀玲; Tung Soo Hua 董素华 |
| 2003 | Chua Ying 蔡萦 | Chun Guek Lay 曾月丽; Lin Chi Yuan 林启元; Ng Siew Leng 黄秀玲; Tung Soo Hua 董素华 |
| 2004 | Tung Soo Hua 董素华 | Chua Ying 蔡萦; Chun Guek Lay 曾月丽; Lin Chi Yuan 林启元; Ng Siew Leng 黄秀玲 |
| 2005 | Tung Soo Hua 董素华 | Chun Guek Lay 曾月丽; Lin Chi Yuan 林启元; Serene Loo 吕诗琳; Ng Siew Leng 黄秀玲 |
| 2006 | Tung Soo Hua 董素华 | Lin Chi Yuan 林启元; Serene Loo 吕诗琳; Ng Siew Leng 黄秀玲; Zhao Wenbei 赵文蓓 |
| 2007 | Tung Soo Hua 董素华 | Lin Chi Yuan 林启元; Ng Siew Leng 黄秀玲; Wang Zheng 王征; Zhao Wenbei 赵文蓓 |
| 2009 | Tung Soo Hua 董素华 | Lin Chi Yuan 林启元; Ng Siew Leng 黄秀玲; Wang Zheng 王征; Zhang Haijie 张海洁; Zhao Wenbei 赵文蓓 |

^{^[I]} Each year is linked to the article about the Star Awards held that year.

== Category facts ==
Most wins

| Rank | 1st | 2nd |
|---|---|---|
| Presenter | Tung Soo Hua | Chun Guek Lay |
| Total wins | 5 wins | 2 wins |

Most nominations

| Rank | 1st | 2nd | 3rd | 4th | 5th | 6th |
|---|---|---|---|---|---|---|
| Presenter | Ng Siew Leng | Tung Soo Hua | Chun Guek Lay; Lin Chi Yuan | Chua Ying | Zhang Haijie; Zhao Wenbei | Serene Loo; Wang Zheng |
| Total nominations | 9 nominations | 8 nominations | 6 nominations | 5 nominations | 3 nominations | 2 nominations |
