= Star Awards for Best News Presenter =

Annual award since 1994 in Singapore

Star Awards for Best News Presenter 最佳新闻主播
- Awarded for: Best Performance by a Mediacorp Presenter in a News Programme
- Country: Singapore
- Presented by: Mediacorp
- First award: 2010
- Final award: 2013

The Best News Presenter is an award presented annually at the Star Awards, a ceremony that was established in 1994.

The category was introduced in 2010, at the 16th Star Awards ceremony. It was introduced as a result of the discontinuation of the Best News/Current Affairs Presenter award to create distinctions news and current affairs presenters.

The award is given in honour of a Mediacorp presenter who has delivered an outstanding performance in a news programme. The nominees are determined by a team of judges employed by Mediacorp; winners are selected by a majority vote from the entire judging panel.

Since its inception, the award has been given to four presenters. Zhao Wenbei is the inaugural and most recent winner in this category, and also the only presenter to win in this category twice since the ceremony held in 2013. In addition, Lin Chi Yuan, Tung Soo Hua, Zhang Haijie, and Zhao have been nominated on four occasions, more than any other presenter. Wang Zheng holds the record for the most nominations without a win, with two.

The award has been discontinued since 2014.

== Recipients ==
Year	Presenter	Nominees
2010	Zhao Wenbei 赵文蓓	Lin Chi Yuan 林启元; Ng Siew Leng 黄秀玲; Tung Soo Hua 董素华; Zhang Haijie 张海洁
2011	Lin Chi Yuan 林启元	Tung Soo Hua 董素华; Wang Zheng 王征; Zhang Haijie 张海洁; Zhao Wenbei 赵文蓓
2012	Tung Soo Hua 董素华	Lin Chi Yuan 林启元; Wang Zheng 王征; Zhao Wenbei 赵文蓓
2012	Zhang Haijie 张海洁	Lin Chi Yuan 林启元; Wang Zheng 王征; Zhao Wenbei 赵文蓓
2013	Zhao Wenbei 赵文蓓	Lin Chi Yuan 林启元; Tung Soo Hua 董素华; Zhang Haijie 张海洁; Zhao Quanyin 赵全胤

^{^[I]} Each year is linked to the article about the Star Awards held that year.

== Category facts ==
Most wins

Rank	1st
Presenter	Zhao Wenbei
Total wins	2 wins

Most nominations

Rank	1st	2nd
Presenter	Lin Chi Yuan; Tung Soo Hua; Zhang Haijie; Zhao Wenbei	Wang Zheng
Total nominations	4 nominations	2 nominations
