= List of hosts with two or more Star Awards in hosting categories =

Mediacorp has given Star Awards to hosts for their performances in variety, info-ed or infotainment programmes since its inception. Throughout the history of the Star Awards, there have been hosts who have received multiple Star Awards for Best Variety Show Host, Best Info-Ed Programme Host, or Best Programme Host.

As of 2026, 8 hosts have received two or more Star Awards in hosting categories. Quan Yi Fong leads the way with nine awards (two Best Variety Show Host awards, one Best Info-Ed Programme Host award, and six Best Programme Host awards), while Sharon Au, Mark Lee and Kym Ng have won four Best Variety Show Host awards. Au was the first to receive four awards in 2003, followed by Lee in 2012, then Ng in 2013, and Quan in 2017. Quan was also the first to receive five, six, seven, eight, and nine awards in 2018, 2019, 2021, 2022, and 2024 respectively.

| Host | Best Variety Show Host awards | Best Info-Ed Programme Host awards | Best Programme Host awards | Total awards | Total nominations |
|---|---|---|---|---|---|
| Quan Yi Fong 权怡凤 | Love Bites 缘来就是你 (2005); Finding U 寻U先锋 (2014) | Where to Stay 到底住哪里？ (2015) | Markets in Asia 游市集 (2017); Unique Lodging 不一样的旅店 (2018); Fixer (season 2) 线人2 (2019); Hear U Out (season 1) 权听你说 (2021); Hear U Out (season 2) 权听你说2 (2022); Hear U Out (season 4) 权听你说4 (2024) | 9 | 18 |
| Kym Ng 鐘琴 | City Beat 城人杂志 (1998); City Beat 城人杂志 (1999); Love on a Plate 名厨出走记 (2011); Jobs Around the World 走遍天涯打工乐 (2013) | | | 4 | 13 |
| Mark Lee 李国煌 | Be My Guest 客人来 (2004); Say It If You Dare (season 3) 有话好好说3 (2007); It's a Small World 国记交意所 (2010); It's a Small World II 国记交意所II (2012) | | | 4 | 11 |
| Sharon Au 欧菁仙 | City Beat 城人杂志 (2000); City Beat 城人杂志 (2001); City Beat 城人杂志 (2002); City Beat 城人杂志 (2003) | | | 4 | 7 |
| Bryan Wong 王禄江 | Home Decor Survivor 摆家乐 (2006) | Food Hometown (season 2) 美食寻根2 (2010) | | 2 | 15 |
| Lee Teng 李腾 | | Let's Talk (season 2) 你在囧什么？！2 (2012) | Love on the Plate (season 3) 名厨出走记3 (2016) | 2 | 10 |
| Belinda Lee 李心钰 | | Come Dance with Me 与心共舞 (2009); Find Me a Singaporean (season 3) 稀游记3 (2013) | | 2 | 4 |
| Christopher Lee 李铭顺 | | | Dishing With Chris Lee 阿顺有煮意 (2023); Dishing With Chris Lee (season 2) 阿顺有煮意 S2 (2025) | 2 | 4 |
