= Star Awards for Best Current Affairs Presenter =

Annual award in Singapore

Star Awards for Best Current Affairs Presenter 最佳时事节目主持人
- Awarded for: Best Performance by a Mediacorp Presenter in a Current Affairs Programme
- Country: Singapore
- Presented by: Mediacorp
- First award: 2010
- Final award: 2013
- Currently held by: Vacant

The Best Current Affairs Presenter was an award presented annually at the Star Awards, a ceremony that was established in 1994.

The category was introduced in 2010, at the 16th Star Awards ceremony. It was introduced as a result of the discontinuation of the Best News/Current Affairs Presenter award to create distinctions between news and current affairs presenters.

The award was given in honour of a Mediacorp presenter who has delivered an outstanding performance in a current affairs programme. The nominees were determined by a team of judges employed by Mediacorp; winners were selected by a majority vote from the entire judging panel. Chun Guek Lay is the inaugural winner in this category for her performance in Focus.

The award was given to three presenters in the 4 years that the award was presented before its final appearance as an award in 2013. Chun and Tung Soo Hua were the final winners for their performances in Focus and Money Week respectively. Since the ceremony held in 2013, Chun is also the only presenter to win in this category three times, surpassing Tung who has two wins. Desmond Lim and Qi Qi hold the record for the most nominations without a win.

The award was discontinued since 2014.

== Recipients ==
Year	Presenter	Title	Nominees
2010	Chun Guek Lay 曾月丽	Focus 焦点	Youyi 有懿 — Good Morning Singapore 早安您好; Desmond Lim 林树源 — Good Morning Singapore 早安您好; Qi Qi 琪琪 — Good Morning Singapore 早安您好; Tung Soo Hua 董素华 — Money Week 财经追击
2011	Tung Soo Hua 董素华	Money Week 财经追击	Chun Guek Lay 曾月丽 — Focus 焦点; Youyi 有懿 — Good Morning Singapore 早安您好; Desmond Lim 林树源 — Good Morning Singapore 早安您好; Qi Qi 琪琪 — Good Morning Singapore 早安您好
2012	Chun Guek Lay 曾月丽	Focus 焦点	Desmond Lim 林树源 — Good Morning Singapore 早安您好; Qi Qi 琪琪 — Good Morning Singapore 早安您好; Tung Soo Hua 董素华 — Money Week 财经追击
2012	Youyi 有懿	Good Morning Singapore 早安您好	Desmond Lim 林树源 — Good Morning Singapore 早安您好; Qi Qi 琪琪 — Good Morning Singapore 早安您好; Tung Soo Hua 董素华 — Money Week 财经追击
2013	Chun Guek Lay 曾月丽	Focus 焦点	Youyi 有懿 — Good Morning Singapore 早安您好; Desmond Lim 林树源 — Good Morning Singapore 早安您好; Qi Qi 琪琪 — Good Morning Singapore 早安您好
2013	Tung Soo Hua 董素华	Money Week 财经追击	Youyi 有懿 — Good Morning Singapore 早安您好; Desmond Lim 林树源 — Good Morning Singapore 早安您好; Qi Qi 琪琪 — Good Morning Singapore 早安您好

^{^[I]} Each year is linked to the article about the Star Awards held that year.

== Category facts ==
Most wins

Rank	1st	2nd
Presenter	Chun Guek Lay	Tung Soo Hua
Total wins	3 wins	2 wins
