= Star Awards for Best News Story =

Singaporean television award (2001–2017)

Star Awards for Best News Story 最佳新闻报道
- Current: Star Awards 2024
- Awarded for: Best Performance by a Mediacorp Journalist in a News Story
- Country: Singapore
- Presented by: Mediacorp
- First award: 2001
- Final award: 2017
- Currently held by: Vacant

The Best News Story is an award presented annually at the Star Awards, a ceremony that was established in 1994.

The category was introduced in 2001, at the 8th Star Awards ceremony; Zhu Hong received the award for her performance and it is given in honour of a Mediacorp presenter who has delivered an outstanding performance in a news programme. The nominees are determined by a team of judges employed by Mediacorp; winners are selected by a majority vote from the entire judging panel.

Since its inception, the award has been given to sixteen journalists. Lip was the most recent winner in this category. Since the ceremony held in 2016, Evelyn Lam is also the only journalist to win in this category thrice, surpassing Ng Lian Cheong and Chen Meiling who all have two wins each. In addition, Ng has been nominated on four occasions, more than any other journalist. Hu Jielan holds the record for the most nominations without a win, with three.

== Recipients ==
Year	Recipient	News programme	Ref
2001	Zhu Hong 朱荭		
2001	Yang Shulian 杨淑莲		
2002	Wu Jinfeng 吴金凤		
2003	Chen Meiling 陈美玲		
2004	Chen Meiling 陈美玲		
2005	Serene Loo 吕诗琳		
2006	Huang Zhihao 黄志豪		
2007	Cai Shuxian 蔡淑贤		
2009	Cheng Zhaojie 程照杰		
2010	Ng Lian Cheong 吴俍㬕		
2011	Evelyn Lam 蓝丽婷		
2012	Evelyn Lam 蓝丽婷		
2013	Evelyn Lam 蓝丽婷		
2014	Lim Wee Leng 林伟玲	Little India Riot	
2015	Ng Lian Cheong 吴俍㬕	AirAsia Incident	
2016	Lip Kwok Wai 聂国威		
2017	Ang Poh Ling 洪宝玲 and Lu Yawen 陆雅雯		

== Multiple awards and nominations ==
The following individuals received two or more awards:

Wins	Actor	Nominations
3	Evelyn Lam	4
2	Chen Meiling	
2	Ng Lian Cheong	7

The following individuals received two or more nominations:

Nominations	Actor
7	Ng Lian Cheong
6	Lip Kwok Wa
4	Evelyn Lam
3	Hu Jielan
3	Chng Kheng Leng
2	Liang Kaixin
2	Seet Sok Hwee
