= Qi Qi (host) =

- Born: Lim Yi Chyi; Singapore
- Occupations: Host, Deejay
- Years active: 2003 – present
- Musical career
- Instrument: Vocal

Qi Qi (Chinese: 琪琪; pinyin: Qíqí; born Lim Yi Chyi ) is a Singaporean television host and radio deejay. She was prominently a full-time Mediacorp host from 2003 to 2017 but continues to be a radio deejay.

== Biography ==
Lim graduated economics from George Mason University. Upon graduation, she became a radio deejay of 883JiaFM and Radio Singapore International, and later a current affairs host of Mediacorp Channel 8 since 2004, where she got nominated for Most Popular Newcomer in Star Awards 2004 for her first television appearance in Good Morning Singapore.

== News/Current affairs programme ==
Year	Title
2003–2014	Good Morning Singapore 早安您好！
2014	Our People, Our Music 全民共乐
2014–2017	Hello Singapore

== Compilation album ==
Year	Mandarin title	English title
2012	新传媒群星金龙接财神	MediaCorp Music Lunar New Year Album 12
2018	新传媒群星阿狗狗过好年	MediaCorp Music Lunar New Year Album 18
2019	新传媒群星猪饱饱欢乐迎肥年	MediaCorp Music Lunar New Year Album 19
2020	裕鼠鼠纳福迎春了	MediaCorp Music Lunar New Year Album 20

== Awards and accolades ==
Organisation	Year	Category	Work	Result	Ref
Star Awards	2004	Most Popular Newcomer	Good Morning Singapore 早安您好！	Nominated	
Star Awards	2010	Best Current Affairs Presenter	Good Morning Singapore 早安您好！	Nominated	
Star Awards	2011	Best Current Affairs Presenter	Good Morning Singapore 早安您好！	Nominated	
Star Awards	2012	Best Current Affairs Presenter	Good Morning Singapore 早安您好！	Nominated	
Star Awards	2013	Best Current Affairs Presenter	Good Morning Singapore 早安您好！	Nominated	
Star Awards	2025	Top 10 Most Popular Female Artistes	—N/a	Nominated	
