= Star Awards 2000 =

Singaporean television awards

Star Awards 2000 红星大奖2000
- Date: 26 November 2000
- Location: MediaCorp TV Theatre
- Country: Singapore
- Hosted by: Timothy Cao; Yvette Tsui

Highlights
- Most nominations: Hainan Kopi Tales 瓊園咖啡香; The Legendary Swordsman 笑傲江湖
- Best Drama Serial: Hainan Kopi Tales 瓊園咖啡香
- Best Variety Show: City Beat 城人雜誌
- Best Actor: Chew Chor Meng 周初明
- Best Actress: Ivy Lee 李錦梅
- Special Achievement Award: Fann Wong 范文芳

Television/radio coverage
- Network: Mediacorp Channel 8

Star Awards 2000 is the seventh installment of the annual Star Awards presented by the Television Corporation of Singapore to honour its artistes who work on Channel 8. The ceremony were hosted by Timothy Chao and Yvette Tsui.

The award ceremony saw numerous changes in the award ceremony, with the Taiwan popularity votes being discontinued and were solely decided by the Malaysia viewers alone, new categories were introduced (such as the Best News/Current Affairs Presenter, now as two separate categories), and nominations for both Primetime and Daytime programs were merged. The ceremony also introduced a new crystal trophy made in Shanghai, designed with a shape of S and A on the angle of view (which represents the initials of Star Awards), and the trophy has been used ever since the ceremony. This was also the last ceremony to be presented under Television Corporation of Singapore before its rebranding to Mediacorp, which would be first used in the next ceremony in 2001.

== History ==
As both Bryan Wong and Guo Liang left Mediacorp before the Star awards' nomination, they were not eligible for nominations.

== Winners and nominees ==
Winners are listed first, highlighted in boldface.

Professional and technical awards were presented before the main ceremony via a clip montage due to time constraints. Unless otherwise stated, the lists of winners are only reflected in the table.

**Best Director 最佳导演**: **Jasmine Woo 邬毓琳 - 随心所遇**	**Best Screenplay 最佳剧本**: **TBC - Hainan Kopi Tales 琼园咖啡香**
**Best Variety Producer 最佳综艺编导**: **Johnni Law 罗文辉 - Affairs of the Heart 心手相连**	**Best Variety Research Writer 最佳综艺资料撰稿**: **Tommy Chan 司马哎丫 - LNY Eve Special 2000 歌舞欢腾贺年秀**
**Top Rated Drama Serial 最高收视率电视剧**: **The Legendary Swordsman 笑傲江湖**	**Top Rated Variety Series 最高收视率综艺节目**: **Battle of the Best 強中自有強中手**

The main awards were presented during the ceremony.

**Best Drama Serial 最佳电视剧**: **Hainan Kopi Tales 琼园咖啡香**; Angel's Dream 真相; As You Like It 随心所欲; The Legendary Swordsman 笑傲江湖; The Tax Files 流金税月	**Best Sitcom 最佳情景喜剧**: **School Days 七彩学堂**; Adam's Company 亚当周记; Don't Worry Be Happy (Season 5) 敢敢做个开心人5; The Return of Liang Ximei 再见梁细妹; Soho@Work (Season 2) 新新关系2
**Best Variety Programme 最佳综艺节目**: **City Beat 城人杂志**; Affairs of the Heart 心手相连; Battle of the Best 强中自有强中手; NKF Charity Show 2000 群星照亮千万心- 新传媒人齐献力; Travel Hunt 奇趣搜搜搜	**Best Theme Song 最佳主题曲**: **Kit Chan 陈洁仪 — My Home Affairs 家事 - 《家事》**; Dreamz FM 梦飞船 — Angel's Dream 真相 - 《我的沉默》; Tay Ping Hui 郑斌辉 — As You Like It 随心所欲 - "What I Want to Do"; Mavis Hee 许美静 — Hainan Kopi Tales 琼园咖啡香 - 《咖啡香》; Fann Wong 范文芳 — The Legendary Swordsman 笑傲江湖 - 《豪情笑江湖》
**Best Actor 最佳男主角**: **Chew Chor Meng 周初明 - Hainan Kopi Tales 琼园咖啡香**; Christopher Lee 李铭顺 - Coup De Scorpion 天蝎行动; Li Nanxing 李南星 - Coup De Scorpion 天蝎行动; Terence Cao 曹国辉 - Four Walls and a Ceiling 我爱黄金屋; Tay Ping Hui 郑斌辉 - My Home Affairs 家事	**Best Actress 最佳女主角**: **Ivy Lee 李锦梅 - Angel's Dream 真相**; Fann Wong 范文芳 - The Legendary Swordsman 笑傲江湖; Jacelyn Tay 郑秀珍 - The Legendary Swordsman 笑傲江湖; Lin Meijiao 林梅娇- Hainan Kopi Tales 琼园咖啡香; Zoe Tay 郑惠玉 - My Home Affairs 家事
**Best Supporting Actor 最佳男配角**: **Chen Guohua 陈国华 - My Home Affairs 家事**; Ix Shen - Hero of the Times 新方世玉; Vincent Ng - Hainan Kopi Tales; Yao Wenlong - Hainan Kopi Tales; Zheng Geping - The Legendary Swordsman 笑傲江湖	**Best Supporting Actress 最佳女配角**: **Xiang Yun - My Home Affairs 家事**; Chen Huihui - Hainan Kopi Tales; Hong Huifang - The Legendary Swordsman; Huang Biren - Angel's Dream 真相; Florence Tan 陈秀丽 - The Legendary Swordsman
**Best Variety Show Host 最佳综艺主持人**: **Sharon Au 欧菁仙 - City Beat 城人杂志**; Chen Shucheng 陈澍城 - PSC Nite 普威之夜; Dasmond Koh 许振荣 - Celebrity Telematch 全能大赢家; Huang Bingjie 黄炳杰 - Battle of the Best 强中自有强中手; Jack Neo 梁智强 - NKF Charity Show 2000 群星照亮千万心—新传媒艺人齐献力	**Best Comedy Performer 最佳喜剧演员**: **Huang Wenyong 黄文永 - Don't Worry, Be Happy 敢敢做个开心人**; Jack Neo 梁智强 - The Return of Liang Ximei 再见梁细妹; Mark Lee 李国煌 - Soho@Work 新新关系; Richard Low 刘谦益 - Don't Worry, Be Happy 敢敢做个开心人; Sharon Au 欧菁仙 - Soho@Work 新新关系
**Best News/Current Affairs Presenter 最佳新闻播报/时事节目主持人**: **Chun Guek Lay 曾月丽**; Carol Chiam 詹玉珍; Chua Ying 蔡萦; Helen Cheung 张海洁; Ng Siew Leng 黄秀玲	**Most Popular Newcomer**: **Dasmond Koh**; Priscelia Chan; Raymond Chen 陈睿奇; Vivian Lai; Robin Leong 梁侠儿; Liao Yunyi 廖匀佚; Oh Say Tuck 胡世达; Qi Yuwu; Jeff Wang

=== Special awards ===
Special Achievement Award 特别成就奖
- Fann Wong

=== Top 10 Most Popular Artiste ===
Top 10 Most Popular Male Artistes	Top 10 Most Popular Female Artistes
**Chen Hanwei**; **Chew Chor Meng**; **Christopher Lee**; **Dasmond Koh**; **Jack Neo**; **James Lye**; **Li Nanxing**; **Terence Cao**; **Tay Ping Hui**; **Vincent Ng**; Darren Lim; Henry Thia; Huang Bingjie; Richard Low; Chen Shucheng; Huang Wenyong; Chen Tianwen; Rayson Tan; Henry Thia; Mak Ho Wai; Danny Yeo; Mark Lee	**Ann Kok**; **Chen Liping**; **Fann Wong**; **Huang Biren**; **Ivy Lee**; **Jacelyn Tay**; **Pan Lingling**; **Phyllis Quek**; **Sharon Au**; **Zoe Tay**; Cynthia Koh; Diana Ser; ~~Ericia Lee~~ (Note: Lee was disqualified midway during the voting period due to contractual violation. There was no replacement nominee.); Florence Tan; Hong Huifang; Lin Meijiao; Lynn Poh; May Phua; Patricia Mok; Tracer Wong; Xiang Yun; Yvonne Lim

==== Malaysia polls ====
Malaysia's Favourite Drama Serial 马来西亚最受欢迎电视剧	Malaysia's Favourite Male Artiste 马来西亚最受欢迎男艺人	Malaysia's Favourite Female Artiste 马来西亚最受欢迎女艺人
**The Legendary Swordsman**	**Chew Chor Meng**	**Fann Wong**
