= Perfect Cut =

- 一切完美
- Starring: Thomas Ong; Michelle Tay; Michelle Chia
- Opening theme: Season 1: 我知道我变漂亮了 by Chew Xin Hui; Season 2: 放了爱 sung by Jocie Kwok
- Original language: Chinese
- No. of episodes: 13 per season

Production
- Producers: Molby Low 刘健财; Canter Chia 谢光华
- Running time: approx. 45 minutes

Original release
- Network: MediaCorp Channel U
- Release: 2008 – 2009

Perfect Cut (Chinese: 一切完美) is a Singaporean Chinese drama series which aired on MediaCorp Channel U. The second season debuted on 4 March 2009 in the weekday 10:00pm slot. It features former MediaCorp artistes such as Edmund Chen and Zheng Wanling in main roles. This was the first drama series to be produced by Wawa Pictures.

== Synopsis ==
Alex Tan is a well-regarded plastic surgeon known as "the doctor with a soul". The story centers on his patients and the people he meets in his clinic.

== Cast ==
- Thomas Ong as Alex Tan (season 1)
- Michelle Chia as Kelly Lim (season 1)
- Michelle Tay as Wu Xiaoli 吴晓莉 (season 1)
- Julian Hee as Sky Tan (season 1)
- Edmund Chen as Win Cheong 张乐风 (season 2)
- Phyllis Quek as Joey Cheong 张乐依 (season 2)
- Zheng Wanling as Emily Tan (season 2)

=== Guest cast ===
Season 1

- Yvonne Lim
- Alan Tern
- Constance Song
- Jerry Yeo
- Nick Shen
- Bernard Tan

Season 2

- Lina Ng
- Marcus Chin
- Liang Tian
- Yang Libing
- Priscelia Chan
- Cavin Soh
- Cruz Teng
- Lau Leng Leng

== Accolades ==
Organisation	Year	Category	Nominee	Result	Ref.
Star Awards	2009	Best Drama Serial	—N/a	Nominated	
Star Awards	2009	Young Talent Award	Regene Lim 林詠谊	Won	
Star Awards	2009	Best Theme Song	"我知道我变漂亮了" by Chew Sin Huey	Nominated	
Star Awards	2010	Best Drama Serial	—N/a	Nominated	
Star Awards	2010	Favourite Male Character	Thomas Ong	Nominated	
Star Awards	2010	Best Theme Song	"放了爱" by Jocie Kwok	Nominated	
