= Star Awards for Social Media Award =

Singaporean media award (2014–2016)

Star Awards for Social Media Award 社交媒体魅力奖
- Awarded for: Most Social Media Engagement by an Artiste
- Country: Singapore
- Presented by: Mediacorp
- First award: 2014
- Final award: 2016
- Currently held by: Vacant

The Star Awards for Social Media Award was an award presented annually from 2014 to 2016 at the Star Awards, where Mediacorp of Singapore recognises entertainers under their employment with awards for artistic and technical merit for outstanding performances of the year.

== History ==
The category was introduced in 2014, at the 20th Star Awards ceremony; Jeanette Aw received the award and it is given in honour of a Mediacorp artiste with the most social media engagement. The results are based on the calculations from three international social media analysis systems; artistes must be active on at least one of the following platforms in order to qualify: Facebook, Twitter and Instagram.

Since its inception, the award has been given to two artistes. Carrie Wong is the most recent and final winner in this category. Since the ceremony held in 2016, Aw remains as the only artiste to win in this category twice, surpassing Wong who has one win.

The award was discontinued from 2017 onwards as the popularity element of the award is already represented in the Top 10 Most Popular Male Artistes and Top 10 Most Popular Female Artistes awards.

== Recipients ==
Year	Artiste	Ref
2014	Jeanette Aw	
2015	Jeanette Aw	
2016	Carrie Wong	
