= Star Awards for Top Rated Drama Serial =

Singaporean media award (2000–2016)

Star Awards for Top Rated Drama Serial 最高收视率电视剧
- Current: Star Awards 2024
- Awarded for: Top Ratings in Mediacorp drama serial
- Country: Singapore
- Presented by: Mediacorp
- First award: 2000
- Final award: 2016

The Star Awards for Best Drama Serial was an award presented annually at the Star Awards, a ceremony that was established in 1994.

The category was introduced in 2000, at the 7th Star Awards ceremony; The Legendary Swordsman received the award and it is given in honour of a Mediacorp drama serial which has the highest overall viewership.

Since its inception, the award has been given to 14 drama serials. Tiger Mum was the final winner in this category.

The award was not presented in 2001 and 2005.

Following changes to the measurement of television viewership, the award category was discontinued from 2017.

== Recipients ==
Year	Title
2000	The Legendary Swordsman 笑傲江湖
2002	Beautiful Connection 九层糕
2003	Holland V 荷兰村
2004	An Ode to Life 三十风雨路
2006	Love Conceirge 爱的掌门人
2007	The Golden Path 黄金路
2009	The Little Nyonya 小娘惹
2010	Housewives' Holiday 煮妇的假期
2011	With You 我在你左右
2012	Love Thy Neighbour 四个门牌一个
2013	Don't Stop Believin' 我们等你
2014	C.L.I.F. 2 警徽天职 2
2015	Three Wishes 三个愿望
2016	Tiger Mum 虎妈来了
