= Wang Zheng (newsreader) =

Singaporean-Chinese news anchor

- 王征
- Born: Wang Zheng; 13 May 1979 (age 46); China
- Education: Beijing International Studies University (formerly known as Beijing Second Foreign Language University)
- Occupations: News Anchor; Journalist; Correspondent; Current Affairs Presenter
- Years active: 2005 - present
- Employer: Mediacorp

Wang Zheng (Chinese: 王征; pinyin: Wáng Zhēng) is a Singaporean-based Chinese News Anchor for Hello Singapore, News Tonight and Singapore Today.

== Career ==
Wang is a Mediacorp Channel 8's news presenter and journalist since March 2005. She left Mediacorp Channel 8 in July 2012 and joined Channel NewsAsia as a Shanghai correspondent till 2013.

Currently, Wang has gone back to Mediacorp Channel 8 to be a news presenter for News 8 at One (1点新闻), Hello Singapore (狮城有约), Singapore Today (狮城6点半). She is also a News Tonight (晚间新闻), MediaCorp Channel 8 and MediaCorp Channel U news presenter. Also, Wang is the co-host of Mediacorp Channel U's Current Affairs Program - World This Week (世界一周) and Channel 8 News & Current Affairs Program - 流行挖哇WOW host.

Although Wang joined Mediacorp in March 2005, she wasn't nominated for Best News / Current Affairs Presenter in Star Awards 2005 and Star Awards 2006 due to the lack of eligible nominees. Starting in 2007, she was nominated for Best News / Current Affairs Presenter, replacing Serene Loo in Star Awards 2007 and Star Awards 2009, Wang wasn't nominated for Best News Presenter in Star Awards 2008, as there wasn't any ceremony held on that year. In Star Awards 2010, due to the lack of eligible nominees, once again, she wasn't nominated for Best News Presenter.

In Star Awards 2011 and Star Awards 2012, she was then nominated for Best News Presenter, replacing Ng Siew Leng, she was also nominated for Best News Story in Star Awards 2011.

In 2013, she left Mediacorp Channel 8 and joined Channel NewsAsia, hence, she wasn't nominated for Best News Presenter in Star Awards 2013. Wang was also nominated for Best News Presenter or Anchor and Best Single News Story / Report (10 min or less) in Asian Television Awards.

== Education ==
Wang graduated from Beijing International Studies University (formerly known as Beijing Second Foreign Language University).

== Compilation album ==
Year	English title	Mandarin title
2009	MediaCorp Music Lunar New Year Album 09	新传媒福牛迎端年
2012	MediaCorp Music Lunar New Year Album 12	新传媒金龙接财神

== Awards and nominations ==
Organisation	Year	Award	Nominated work Title	Result	Ref
Star Awards	2007	Best News / Current Affairs Presenter	—N/a	Nominated	
Star Awards	2009	Best News / Current Affairs Presenter	Singapore Today	Nominated	
Star Awards	2011	Best News Story	海岸线油污覆盖 影响生意	Nominated	
Star Awards	2011	Best News Presenter	News 8 at Ten (10点新闻)	Nominated	
Star Awards	2012	Best News Presenter	News Tonight	Nominated	
