= Jocie Guo =

- Born: 21 March 1982 (age 44)
- Other name: Guo Meimei
- Education: Singapore Polytechnic
- Occupations: Singer; songwriter
- Years active: 2005–present
- Musical career
- Origin: Singapore
- Genre: Mandopop
- Instrument: Vocals
- Labels: Play Music; Warner Music; Idea Music Entertainment; Ocean Butterflies International

Chinese name
- Chinese: 郭美美
- Hanyu Pinyin: Guō Měiměi

Jocie Guo (born Jocie Kok; 21 March 1982) is a Singaporean singer and songwriter. Beginning her career in mid-2005, Guo was signed to Singapore record company Play Music which was known for marketing their new artistes as cartoon caricatures on album covers and music videos. Depicted as a sweet innocent cartoonish character in promotional materials, Guo grew wide recognition within weeks of her debut single release.

== Career ==
The former Singapore Polytechnic student had been an instant success, with her two singles selling a combined 55,000 copies. Guo was viewed as Warner Music Taiwan's priority artiste with an extensive multimillion-dollar marketing campaign planned for her regional debut and was poised to follow the success of another Warner Music's Singaporean singer Stefanie Sun. Her two music videos reportedly cost near to $250,000 to shoot, filmed by top Taiwanese director Lai Wei-kang.

Guo was the first artiste to be granted legal copyrights to sing "Mice Love Rice" outside of China; the resulting hit single was the first to make it to the top of Singapore's RIAS sales chart in 2005. Her first album in 2006, "不怕不怕" ("No More Panic"), out-competed its competitors and became number one on the RIAS sales chart only 10 days after its release. When released in Taiwan, it would sell more than 60,000 copies and attained Platinum status. For Singapore's 2006 May-Day concert, she was invited to perform alongside other big Singaporean stars such as Stefanie Sun in front of a crowd of 20,000. Guo won many "best newcomer" type awards in 2006 such as the "Best Female Newcomer" award from both the 3rd Annual Hit King Awards event that was held in Guangzhou, China and the 6th Annual Global Chinese Music Award Ceremony; she would also win "Best Newcomer" during the Guangdong Radio Station's 9+2 Billboard Music Pioneer Awards Ceremony along with "2006's Most Popular Song" award for her "Bu Pa Bu Pa" single.

In April 2007, Guo performed at Ray Media's 7th Annual Music Awards Ceremony. Also in 2007, Guo received her first six-figure deal to advertise for the Hong Bao Lai ice-cream company in China. Previously, she had also endorsed for Sa Sa Cosmetics and Aji Tei Kyoto Sabo. During 2008, Guo's second album My Darling reached number 2 on Hong Kong's TVB8 Chart and was awarded "Best Newcomer".

In 2011, Guo's contract with Warner Music expired and signed with IME Productions.

In 2016, Guo signed with Chinese label Taihe Music. In 2017, Guo released an album titled Your Name (你的名字).

In 2022, Guo initially planned to hold a concert, My Wonderland, on 19 February but was postponed to 23 April due to Guo being infected with COVID-19.

== Personal life ==
In 2011, Guo was mistaken for Guo Meimei, a Chinese Internet celebrity who was involved in various scandals, due to sharing the same Chinese name. Due to the mistaken identity, she was scolded online by netizens and had to cancel several performances.

In the same year, Guo was diagnosed with endometriosis.

== Discography ==
Guo's debut single includes the cover of the song, Mice Love Rice, with various remixes.

Her second single, No More Panic, a Chinese-language cover version of Dragostea Din Tei by O-Zone, was released in early November 2005.

Guo's debut album, No More Panic, which was released in January 2006, is based on her previous hit single No More Panic and titled the same. The album contained new songs and covers that range from catchy mid-tempo tunes to acoustic folk and sentimental numbers. One of the songs, 勾勾手, was used as the ending theme of the Singaporean drama Love Concierge (爱的掌门人).

Guo also published two more albums for Christmas (2006) and Chinese New Year (2007). She released her next album titled My Darling on 22 October 2007. The album included a cover of Ann Winsborn's La La Love on My Mind. In the following year towards the end of May, a CD+DVD version of My Darling was released and made available worldwide; it contained 2 bonus tracks and a DVD with 5 of her music videos for My Darling.

About a year later, Guo would become the singer for the opening theme song, 放了爱, written by lyricist XiaoHan, and the ending theme song, 许愿树, for the 2009 Singaporean drama Perfect Cut 2 (一切完美2).

=== Studio albums ===
Album #	Album Information
1st	不怕不怕: Released: January, 2006 (Worldwide); Language: Mandarin Chinese; Label: Warner Music; Genre: Mandopop
2nd	My Darling (我的答铃): Released: 22 October 2007 (Worldwide); Language: Mandarin Chinese; Label: Warner Music; Genre: Mandopop; Charts: 爱情女神: #17 (3 weeks)
3rd	I am Jocie (我是郭美美): Released: 26 March 2010 (Singapore); Language: Mandarin Chinese; Label: Warner Music; Genre: Mandopop; Charts: 放了爱: #6 (8 weeks); 二人同行: #1 (10 weeks) 和我来电: #16 (4 weeks)
4th	完美世界: Released: 22 September 2014; Language: Mandarin Chinese
5th	你的名字: Released: 24 February 2017; Language: Mandarin Chinese; Label: Ocean Butterflies Music; Genre: Mandopop
6th	起风了: Released: 26 November 2018; Language: Mandarin Chinese; Label: Ocean Butterflies Music; Genre: Mandopop

== Awards and nominations ==
Year	Award	Category	Nominated work	Result	Ref
2010	Star Awards 2010	Best Theme Song	Perfect Cut 2 – "放了爱"	Nominated	
2022	Star Awards 2022	Best Theme Song	My Star Bride – "温习"	Won	
2023	Star Awards 2023	Best Theme Song	Love at First Bite – "恋香"	Nominated	
