= Zhao Wen Bei =

Singapore-based Chinese news anchor

Zhao Wen Bei 赵文蓓
- Born: Zhao Wen Bei; 17 October 1979 (age 46); China
- Education: Communications University of China
- Occupations: News Anchor; Current Affairs Presenter
- Years active: 2002 - present
- Employer(s): CCTV-4; Mediacorp
- Children: 2

Zhao Wen Bei (Chinese: 赵文蓓; pinyin: Zhào Wénbèi) is a Singapore-based Chinese news anchor for Hello Singapore, News Tonight and Singapore Today.

== Education ==
Zhao graduated from Communications University of China in 2002.

== Career ==
Zhao used to be China's CCTV-4 news anchor in 2002. In 2005, Zhao left CCTV-4 and first joined MediaCorp Channel U, to be the news anchor of News World @ 11 《11点新闻》, News Jab @ 9 《9点新闻》 together with Tung Soo Hua, Liang Ni and Serene Loo. On the other hand, Zhao was also World This Week 《世界一周》's Current Affairs Presenter.

In 2012, when MediaCorp Channel U and MediaCorp Channel 8 news group merge, Zhao was then News 8 at One 《1点新闻》, Hello Singapore 《狮城有约》, Singapore Today 《狮城6点半》 and News Tonight 《晚间新闻》 news anchor. When Zhao joined MediaCorp in 2005, she was nominated for Best News / Current Affairs Presenter in Star Awards 2006 right after a year, replacing Chun Guek Lay.

Since 2006, Zhao was nominated for Best News / Currents Affairs Presenter in Star Awards 2007, Star Awards 2009. There wasn't any ceremony held on 2008, hence she wasn't nominated. In Star Awards 2010, Star Awards 2011, Star Awards 2012, Star Awards 2013 she was nominated for Best News Presenter. Zhao managed to win the Best News Presenters award in 2010 and 2013.

== Personal life ==
Zhao gave birth to a son in 2014 and a daughter in 2016.

== Awards and nominations ==
Organisation	Year	Award	Nominated work	Result	Ref
Star Awards	2006	Best News / Current Affairs Presenter	—N/a	Nominated	
Star Awards	2007	Best News / Current Affairs Presenter	—N/a	Nominated	
Star Awards	2009	Best News / Current Affairs Presenter	—N/a	Nominated	
Star Awards	2010	Best News Presenter	News World @ 11	Won	
Star Awards	2011	Best News Presenter	News Tonight	Nominated	
Star Awards	2012	Best News Presenter	News Tonight	Nominated	
Star Awards	2013	Best News Presenter	Singapore Today	Won	
