= Star Awards for Favourite Host =

Singaporean television award (2012–13)

Star Awards for Favourite Host 最喜爱主持人
- Current: Star Awards 2024
- Awarded for: Most Popular MediaCorp Host
- Country: Singapore
- Presented by: MediaCorp
- First award: 2012
- Final award: 2013
- Currently held by: Vacant

The Star Awards for Favourite Host was an award presented annually at the Star Awards, a ceremony that was established in 1994.

The category was introduced in 2012, at the 18th Star Awards ceremony; Bryan Wong received the award for his performance in Renaissance. The award was introduced after the discontinuation of the Favourite Onscreen Partners (Variety) award. It was given in honour of a MediaCorp host that is deemed the most popular among the television audience. The nominees were determined by a team of judges employed by MediaCorp; winners were selected by a majority vote from the public via online voting.

Since its inception, the award was given to only one host. Bryan Wong is the most recent and final winner in this category, for his performance in S.N.A.P. Pornsak and Wong have been nominated on two occasions, more than any other host. Pornsak also holds the record for the most nominations without a win.

The award was discontinued from 2014 onwards as the popularity element of the award is already represented in the Top 10 Most Popular Male Artistes and Top 10 Most Popular Female Artistes awards.

== Recipients ==
Year	Host	Title	Nominees
2012	Bryan Wong 王禄江	Renaissance 旧欢.心爱	Vivian Lai 赖怡伶 — Home Makeover 2 玩家万岁2; Mark Lee 李国煌 — It's a Small World II 国记交意所II; Pornsak — Food Source II 食在好源头II; Fann Wong 范文芳 — Mission Possible 小村大任务
2013	Bryan Wong 王禄江	S.N.A.P. 熠熠星光总动员	Dennis Chew 周崇庆 — Battle @ Water Margin 我爱水浒转; Lee Teng 李腾 — Let's Talk 3 你在囧什么？！3; Kate Pang 庞蕾馨 — My Fair Ladies 小女人大视界; Pornsak — Food Source III 食在好源头III

^{^[I]}Each year is linked to the article about the Star Awards held that year.

== Category facts ==
Most nominations

Rank	1st
Host	Pornsak; Bryan Wong
Total nominations	2 nominations
