= Star Awards for Favourite Onscreen Partners (Variety) =

Singaporean television award (2011, 2022)

Star Awards for Favourite Onscreen Partners (Variety) 最喜爱综艺搭档
- Current: Star Awards 2024
- Awarded for: Most Popular Variety Show Partners
- Country: Singapore
- Presented by: MediaCorp
- First award: 2011
- Currently held by: Vacant

The Star Awards for Favourite Onscreen Partners (Variety) was an award presented annually at the Star Awards, a ceremony that was established in 1994.

The category was introduced in 2011, at the 17th Star Awards ceremony. It was given in honour of variety show partners that was deemed the most popular among the television audience. The nominees were determined by a team of judges employed by MediaCorp; winners were selected by a majority vote from the public via online voting.

Chen Biyu, Dennis Chew, Marcus Chin & Mark Lee are the recent winners in this category for their performance in Yujian Huangchong (Weekend Edition).

Michelle Chong and Quan were nominated twice, more than any other host. Chong also holds the record for the most nominations without a win.

The award was discontinued from 2011 and was replaced by the Favourite Host award in the following year.

== Recipients ==
Year	Variety partners	Title	Nominees
2011	Christopher Lee 李铭顺 & Quan Yi Fong 权怡凤	Life Transformers 2 心晴大动员2	Chen Hanwei 陈汉玮, Dennis Chew 周崇庆, Michelle Chong 庄米雪, Guo Liang 郭亮, Dasmond Koh 许振荣 & Quan Yi Fong 权怡凤 — Black Rose 爆料黑玫瑰; Michelle Chia 谢韵仪, Michelle Chong 庄米雪, Vivian Lai 赖怡伶 & Yuan Shuai 袁帅 — U’re the Man 花样型男; Mark Lee 李国煌 & Bryan Wong 王禄江 — Home Decor Survivor 4 摆家乐4; Lee Teng 李腾 & Tong Bing Yu 童缤毓 — Dream Potters 梦.窑匠
Perfect Combo 最合拍搭档 (2022)
2022	Chen Biyu 陈碧玉, Dennis Chew 周崇庆, Marcus Chin 陈建彬, Mark Lee 李国煌 - Yujian Huangchong (Weekend Edition) 玉建煌崇 （周末版）		Chen Liping 陈莉萍, Kym Ng 鐘琴 - HDB Tai Tai 4.0 HDB 太太 4.0; Chen Ning 陈宁, Zhong Kun Hua 钟坤华 - SPOP WAVE! SPOP 艺起唱; Desmond Ng 黄振隆, Herman Keh 郭坤耀, Ke Le 阳光可乐 - Curious City 小岛国，大发现; Guo Liang 郭亮, Quan Yi Fong 权怡凤 - Star Awards 2021 红星大奖2021

^{^[I]} Year is linked to the article about the Star Awards held that year.

== Category facts ==
Most nominations

Rank	1st
Host	Michelle Chong; Quan Yi Fong
Total nominations	2 nominations
