= Star Awards 2009 =

Singaporean television awards

Star Awards 2009 红星大奖2009
- Date: 26 April 2009
- Location: MediaCorp TV Theatre
- Country: Singapore
- Hosted by: Guo Liang; Quan Yi Fong

Highlights
- Most awards: Drama: The Little Nyonya (16); Variety/Info-ed: Life Transformers (3)
- Most nominations: Drama: The Little Nyonya (9); Variety/Info-ed: CelebriTEA Break; Come Dance With Me; Life Transformers; MediaCorp 45th Anniversary Gala; Tuesday Report (1 each)
- Best Drama: The Little Nyonya
- Best Variety Show: Life Transformers
- Best Actor: Chen Hanwei
- Best Actress: Joanne Peh
- All-time Favourite Artiste: Huang Biren
- Website: "Official website". Archived from the original on 14 October 2007.

Television/radio coverage
- Network: MediaCorp Channel 8 MediaCorp Channel U
- Runtime: 180 mins (main ceremony); 60 mins (Post-show)

Star Awards 2009 (Chinese: 红星大奖 2009) was a television award ceremony held in Singapore. It was part of the annual Star Awards organised by MediaCorp for its Chinese language division (Channel 8 and Channel U). The awards took place at 26 April 2009 starting at 7pm at MediaCorp Studios, followed by a post-show party airing on Channel U after the ceremony ended.

The nominations were announced on 24 February 2009, and the popularity awards later on 27 March. As like previous years, most technical category awards were presented outside the ceremony. The Best Info-Ed Programme Host award was introduced to recognise infotainment show hosts.

The nomination lists for the main categories were announced on 24 February 2009. Nominations for the popularity awards (Top 10 Most Popular Male and Female Artistes) were announced on 27 March 2009. DueIn contrast of previous Star Awards ceremonies which were held at the end of the year (month of December), a change in the eligibility period for television season (from September of each year to a full calendar year) resulted in 2008 having no ceremonies, and this was the first award ceremony in Star Awards history to be held on the month of April and the format had remained for the future ceremonies since (only the 2020 ceremony was postponed for a year as the ceremony was postponed due to the COVID-19 pandemic in Singapore).

Due to a format change on having two shows in the following year, this was the last Star Awards ceremony, to present the Technical Awards outside the main show until Star Awards 2016, as well as hosting a single award ceremony (not counting prelude or special episodes) until Star Awards 2017.

The year's Best Drama Serial, The Little Nyonya, became the biggest winner for the 2009 ceremony, winning an unprecedented record of nine awards out of 16 nominations, surpassing the former record holder in the 2003 ceremony's drama, Holland V, who previously had seven (out of 10 nominations).

== Nominees and winners ==
Unless otherwise stated, winners are listed first, highlighted in boldface.

=== Backstage achievement awards ceremony ===
As like preceding ceremonies, professional and technical awards were presented before the main ceremony via a clip montage due to time constraints. The lists of winners are only reflected in the table.

**Best Director 最佳导演**: **Chia Mien Yang 谢敏洋 and Chong Liung Man 张龙敏 – The Little Nyonya 小娘惹**	**Best Screenplay 最佳剧本**: **Ang Eng Tee 洪荣狄 – The Little Nyonya 小娘惹**
**Best Set Design 最佳美术设计**: **Ho Hock Choon 何福春 – The Little Nyonya 小娘惹**	**Best Music & Sound Design 最佳音乐与音效设计**: **Wong Lee Chin 黄丽清 – Rhythm of Life 变奏曲**
**Best Editing 最佳剪辑**: **Teo Pit Hong Joyce 张必芳 – The Little Nyonya 小娘惹**	**Best Variety Producer 最佳综艺编导**: **Elaine See 施意玲 – MediaCorp 45th Anniversary Gala 45载光芒8方贺台庆**
**Best Variety Research Writer 最佳综艺资料撰稿**: **Lim Kar Yee 林嘉仪 – Life Transformers 心晴大动员**	**Best Promotional Video 最佳宣传短片**: **Danny Loh Boon Kiat 罗文杰 – Super Mummy (Audition Promotional Video) 全能俏妈妈 甄选宣传片**
**Best News Story 最佳新闻报道**: **Cheng Zhaojie 程照杰 – Breakdown at Singapore Flyer 观景轮发生故障**
**Best Current Affairs Story 最佳时事报道**: **Grace Yang Hsiao Hung 杨晓红 and Iccey Ang 洪丽娇 – Focus 焦点 – Election of Taiwan President Ma Ying-jeou 马英九当选台湾新总统**

=== Main ceremony ===
Winners and nominees:

**Best Drama Serial 最佳电视剧**: **The Little Nyonya**; By My Side; Just in Singapore; Love Blossoms; Perfect Cut; The Golden Path	**Best Variety Programme 最佳综艺节目**: **Life Transformers 心晴大动员**; Buzzing Cashier 抢摊大行动; CelebriTEA Break 艺点心思; King of Thrift 2 Smart省钱王 2; Star Chef 2 至尊厨王2; Superband 非常Superband
**Best Variety Special 最佳综艺特备节目**: **MediaCorp 45th Anniversary Gala 45载光芒8方贺台庆**; The Sichuan Earthquake Charity Show 让爱川流不息; S-Pop Hurray! Music Gala S-POP万岁！音乐大典; Star Awards 25th Anniversary Show; Star Search 2007- Grand Finals 才华横溢出新秀2007总决赛; Superband- Grand Finals 非常Superband – 大决战	**Best Info-ed Programme 最佳资讯节目**: **Tuesday Report: In The Face Of Death 星期二特写：生死一线**; Come Dance with Me 与心共舞; Food Hometown 美食寻根; My World My Blog 青涩部落格; Of Rites And Rituals 2 我们的大日子2; Tuesday Report: 5 Years SARS-free 星期二特写:SARS后的天空
**Best Actor 最佳男主角**: **Chen Han Wei – By My Side**; Huang Wenyong 黄文永 – Just in Singapore; Adrian Pang 彭耀顺 – Nanny Daddy 奶爸百分百; Pierre Png 方展发 – The Little Nyonya; Qi Yuwu 戚玉武 – The Little Nyonya; Tay Ping Hui 郑斌辉 – The Golden Path	**Best Actress 最佳女主角**: **Joanne Peh 白微秀 – The Little Nyonya**; Jeanette Aw 欧萱 – The Little Nyonya; Chen Liping 陈莉萍 – Just in Singapore; Chen Liping 陈莉萍 – The Golden Path; Felicia Chin 陈靓瑄 – The Golden Path; Fann Wong 范文芳 – The Defining Moment 沸腾冰点
**Best Supporting Actor 最佳男配角**: **Chew Chor Meng 周初明 – The Golden Path**; Dai Yang Tian 戴阳天 – The Little Nyonya; Darren Lim 林明伦 – The Little Nyonya; San Yow 姚文龙 – The Little Nyonya; Zzen Zhang 张镇祥 – The Little Nyonya; Zhu Houren 朱厚任 – The Defining Moment 沸腾冰点	**Best Supporting Actress 最佳女配角**: **Ng Hui 黄慧 – The Little Nyonya**; **Xiang Yun 向云 – The Little Nyonya**; Cai Peixuan 蔡佩璇 – The Golden Path; Eelyn Kok 郭惠雯 – The Little Nyonya; Li Yinzhu 李茵珠 – The Little Nyonya; Lin Meijiao 林梅娇 – The Little Nyonya
**Best Variety Show Host 最佳综艺主持人**: **Guo Liang 郭亮 – CelebriTEA Break 艺点心思**; Marcus Chin 陈建彬 – Golden Age Singing Contest 2008 黄金年华之斗歌竞艺2008; Christopher Lee 李铭顺 – Life Transformers 心晴大动员; Lee Teng 李腾 – On the Beat 3 都市大发现3; Kym Ng 鐘琴 – Buzzing Cashier 抢摊大行动; Quan Yi Fong 权怡凤 – Life Transformers 心晴大动员	**Best Info-Ed Show Host 最佳资讯主持人**: **Belinda Lee 李心钰 – Come Dance With Me 与心共舞**; Chua Lee Lian 蔡礼莲 – Food Old Days 寻找原之味; Guo Liang 郭亮 – Breaking Barriers 亮点人生 - 真情无障碍; Belinda Lee 李心钰 – Find Me A Singaporean 2 稀游记2; Christina Lim 林佩芬 – So Simple 简单就是美; Dasmond Koh 许振荣 – Tourism Insiders 旅游线上我在行
**Best Newcomer 最佳新人奖**: **Dai Yang Tian**; Andie Chen; Paige Chua; Koh Yah Hwee; Jerry Yeo; Zhang Zhen Huan	**Best News Anchor / Current Affairs Presenter 最佳新闻播报与实事节目主持人**: **Tung Soo Hua**; Lin Chi Yuan 林启元; Ng Siew Leng 黄秀玲; Wang Zheng; Zhang Haijie; Zhao Wenbei
**Young Talent Award 青苹果奖**: **Regene Lim 林咏谊 – Perfect Cut 一切完美**; Clarence Hu 胡康乐 – La Femme 绝对佳人; Lin Jia An 林家安 – By My Side 不凡的爱; Ng Xin Yi 黄馨仪 – Love Blossoms I 心花朵朵开I; Peng Xiu Xuan 彭修轩 – Just in Singapore 一房半厅一水缸; Christabelle Tan 陈宇萱 – The Little Nyonya 小娘惹	**Best Theme Song 最佳主题曲**: **Olivia Ong – The Little Nyonya 小娘惹 – 《如燕》**; Chew Sin Huey 石欣卉 – Perfect Cut 一切完美 – 《我知道我变漂亮了》; Mi Lu Bin 迷路兵 – The Golden Path 黄金路 – 《路》; Cavin Soh 苏智诚 – Love Blossoms I 心花朵朵开I – 《心花朵朵开》; Daren Tan Sze Wei 陈世维 – Crime Busters x 2 叮当神探 – 《幻听》; Yi Xun 亦迅 – Just in Singapore一房半厅一水缸 – 《屋檐》

**Top 10 Highest Viewership Local Dramas in 2008 十大最高收视率**
1. The Little Nyonya
2. Nanny Daddy 奶爸百分百
3. Just in Singapore
4. By My Side
5. Beach.Ball.Babes 球爱大战
6. La Femme
7. Crime Busters x 2
8. The Truth
9. Taste of Love
10. Rhythm of Life

=== Popularity awards ===
==== All Time Favourite Artiste ====
This award is a special achievement award given out to artiste(s) who have achieved a maximum of 10 popularity awards over 10 years.

**All Time Favourite Artiste** **超级红星**	**Huang Bi Ren 黄碧仁**	1997 | 1999 | 2000 | 2001 | 2002 | 2003 | 2004 | 2005 | 2006 | 2007

==== Top 10 awards ====
Winners and nominees:

Note	Description
Italic	New to list (Not nominated last year).
**Bold**	Awardees who made it to the Show 2 top 10.
	Made it to top 10 in the week / Fall under the Top n category.
n	How many of this awards the awardee got.
**10**	To be awarded the All-Time Favourite Artiste in the next Star Awards.

Artistes	Top 10
Top 10 Most Popular Male Artistes 十大最受欢迎男艺人
Chen Shucheng 陈澍城	
Zhang Yaodong 张耀栋	
**Tay Ping Hui 郑斌辉**	8
Zhu Houren 朱厚任	
**Zheng Geping 郑各评**	1
**Qi Yuwu 戚玉武**	5
Marcus Chin 陈建彬	
Pierre Png 方展发	
**Pornsak**	1
**Henry Thia 程旭辉**	2
**Mark Lee 李国煌**	**10**
Adrian Pang 彭耀順	
Gurmit Singh 葛米星	
**Chen Hanwei 陈汉玮**	6
**Elvin Ng 黄俊雄**	3
Guo Liang 郭亮	
**Christopher Lee 李铭顺**	**10**
**Bryan Wong 王禄江**	6
Richard Low 刘谦益	
Huang Wenyong 黄文永	
Top 10 Most Popular Female Artistes 十大最受欢迎女艺人
Patricia Mok 莫小玲	
**Ivy Lee 李锦梅**	7
Hong Huifang 洪慧芳	
Dawn Yeoh 姚懿珊	
**Yvonne Lim 林湘萍**	2
**Felicia Chin 陈凤玲**	3
Michelle Chia 谢韵仪	
**Jeanette Aw 欧萱**	5
Michelle Chong 庄米雪	
**Quan Yi Fong 权怡凤**	4
Pan Lingling 潘玲玲	
Kym Ng 钟琴	
**Rui En 瑞恩**	4
Lin Meijiao 林梅娇	
Jin Yinji 金银姬	
Fiona Xie 谢宛谕	
**Joanne Peh 白薇秀**	3
**Xiang Yun 向云**	9
**Jesseca Liu 刘子绚**	3
**Vivian Lai 赖怡伶**	5

== Presenters ==
The following individuals presented awards or performed musical numbers.

Artistes / Special guests	Presented / Performed
Acting Minister, Information, Communications and the Arts; Lui Tuck Yew	Gave out award for Best Drama Serial
Chen Meifeng; Jason Wang	Presented Best Supporting Actor and Best Supporting Actress
Chairman, MediaCorp; Ho Kwon Ping	Presented Best Variety Special
CEO, MediaCorp; Lucas Chow 周永强	Presented Best Variety Programme
National University of Singapore Associate Professor; Chin Kwee Nyat 陈桂月	Presented Best News / Current Affairs Presenter
Chen Liping; Chew Chor Meng	Presented Best Newcomer
Sam Tseng	Presented Best Info-Ed Show Host and Best Variety Programme Host
President of Singapore; S.R. Nathan	Gave out award for All-Time Favourite Artiste
David Chiang; Kathy Chow	Presented Best Actor and Best Actress
Ada Choi; Xia Yu; Myolie Wu	Presented Top 10 Most Favourite Male Artistes
Ethan Juan; Zoe Tay; Sam Tseng 曾国城	Presented Top 10 Most Favourite Female Artistes

== Accolades ==
Organisation	Year	Category	Nominee(s)	Result	Ref
Star Awards	2010	Best Set Design 最佳综艺布景设计奖	Mohd B Abdul Rahim	Nominated	
Star Awards	2010	Best Variety Special	—N/a	Nominated	
