= Yvette Tsui =

Taiwanese television host

Yvette Tsui (Chinese: 崔麗心; born 1 May 1963) is a Taiwanese former television host. She shared the Golden Bell Award for Best Variety Show Host with Chao Ning in 1990 and 1992.

== Career ==
In 1994, Tsui was invited to Singapore to host the inaugural Star Awards with local veteran actor Chen Shucheng.

== Personal life ==
Yvette Tsui's family was from Yantai. She spent her youth in Nuannuan, Keelung.

Tsui married Lee Chen-chia, an employee of China Television who was ten years older than she was, in 1991. Tsui moved from Neihu District to Tianmu, Shilin District, in 1997. She retired in 2004, after a twenty five-year career, and moved to Vancouver with her husband. Tsui stated in 2013 that she would return to Taiwan to care for her parents after her daughter started college. She later moved to Singapore.
