= Star Awards 2010 =

Singaporean television awards

Star Awards 2010 红星大奖2010
- Date: 18 April 2010 - Show 1; 25 April 2010 - Show 2
- Location: Show 1: MediaCorp TV Theatre; Walk of Fame, Show 2 and Post-show: Resorts World Sentosa
- Country: Singapore
- Hosted by: Show 1: Kym Ng; Mark Lee; Michelle Chia; Vivian Lai; Pornsak; Lee Teng; Michelle Chong; Dennis Chew; Show 2: Guo Liang; Quan Yi Fong

Highlights
- Most awards: Drama: Together (20); Variety/Info-ed: Stars for a Cause (4)
- Most nominations: Drama: Together; Reunion Dinner (4 each); Variety/Info-ed: It's A Small World (2)
- Best Drama: Together
- Best Variety Show: It's a Small World
- Best Actor: Chen Hanwei
- Best Actress: Chen Liping
- All-time Favourite Artiste: Christopher Lee; Mark Lee
- Website: starawards2010.mediacorptv.sg

Television/radio coverage
- Network: MediaCorp Channel 8 MediaCorp Channel U
- Runtime: 180 mins (both presentations); 60 mins (Walk of Fame and Post-show)

Star Awards 2010 (Chinese: 红星大奖 2010) was a double television award ceremony held in Singapore. It is part of the annual Star Awards organised by MediaCorp for the two free-to-air channels, MediaCorp Channel 8 and MediaCorp Channel U.

The nomination lists for the main categories and popularity awards were announced on 3 February and 18 March 2010, respectively.

This year Star Awards marked the first time the Professional and Technical awards (given out to backstage crew and scriptwriters) were telecast and presented in one show (first show), and was also the second year to host multiple award shows airing on two separate Sunday nights, after 2007. While the first show was still held at MediaCorp TV Theatre, the second show was, for the third time in Star Awards' history, being held on the new location of Resorts World Sentosa, after 1996 and 2006.

Also introduced this year were the six awards, Favourite Male Character, Favourite Female Character, Most Unforgettable TV Villain, Male Media Darling, Female Media Darling and Rocket Award, all of which were awarded on the first show (亮闪八方 (lit. Dazzling Awards)). The first three awards were decided by online voting that run from 1 March until 11 April with the results being announced during the first ceremony. The Rocket Award was also introduced, which mainly focuses on the artiste who contributed the most improvement throughout the past year.

Both of the ceremonies were broadcast live on 18 and 25 April 2010. The post-show was held after the second ceremony at 10pm on Channel U.

Together and Reunion Dinner each won four awards combined from both ceremonies, for the former it holds the largest nominations for the ceremony with 20 and also won the Best Drama Serial, while the biggest winner for the Variety/Info-ed category It's A Small World won two.

== Programme details ==
| Date | Shows | Time | Channel | Venue |
|---|---|---|---|---|
| 18 April 2010 | Star Awards 2010 Show 1 | 7pm to 10pm | MediaCorp Channel 8 | MediaCorp TV Theatre |
| 25 April 2010 | Star Awards 2010 Red Carpet | 5.30pm to 6.30pm | MediaCorp Channel 8 | Resorts World Sentosa |
| 25 April 2010 | Star Awards 2010 Show 2 | 7pm to 10pm | MediaCorp Channel 8 | Resorts World Sentosa |
| 25 April 2010 | Star Awards 2010 Post Show Party | 10pm to 11pm | MediaCorp Channel U | Resorts World Sentosa |

== Nominees and winners ==
Unless otherwise stated, winners are listed first, highlighted in boldface.

=== Show 1 ===
| **Young Talent Award 青苹果奖**: **Regene Lim 林咏谊 – Reunion Dinner 团圆饭**; Boon Hui Lu 文慧如 – My School Daze 书包太重; Jarren Ho 何俊扬 – My School Daze 书包太重; Grace Ng 黄馨仪 – Love Blossoms 心花朵朵开; Jerald Tan 陈杰乐 – Reunion Dinner 团圆饭 | **Best Info-Ed Programme 最佳资讯节目**: **Stars for a Cause 明星志工队**; Diminishing Horizons 消失地平线; Food Hometown 2 美食寻根2; Tuesday Report - Extraordinary People 星期二特写 - 不平凡的人; Tuesday Report - Life In A One-Room Flat 星期二特写 - 一房世界 |
| **Best Director 最佳导演**: **Tay Peck Choo 郑碧珠 – Together 当我们同在一起**; Chong Liung Man 张龙敏 – Together 当我们同在一起; Lai Lee Thin 赖丽婷 – Together 当我们同在一起; Leong Lye Lin 梁来玲 – Baby Bonus 添丁发财; Loo Yin Kam 卢燕金 – Together 当我们同在一起 | **Best Screenplay 最佳剧本**: **Ang Eng Tee 洪荣狄 – Reunion Dinner 团圆饭**; Ang Eng Tee 洪荣狄 – Together 当我们同在一起; Chen Sew Koon 陈秀群 and Seah Choon Guan 谢俊源 – My School Daze 书包太重; Freddy Leow 廖明利 and Cynthia Chong 张湄云 – Housewives' Holiday 煮妇的假期; Winnie Wong 王尤红 and Tang Yeow 陈耀 – Daddy at Home 企鹅爸爸 |
| **Best Theme Song 最佳主题曲**: **Kelvin Tan 陈伟联 – Together 当我们同在一起 – 《我们》**; Cavin Soh 苏智诚 – Daddy at Home 企鹅爸爸 – 《男人可贵》; Jocie Kok 郭美美 – Perfect Cut 2 一切完美2 – 《放了爱》; Jade Liu 刘力扬 – The Ultimatum 双子星 – 《寂寞光年》; Jeff Wang 王建复 – Table of Glory 乒乓圆 – 《乒乓圆》 | **Best Variety Research Writer 最佳综艺资料撰稿**: **Lim Kar Yee 林嘉仪 – Paris and Milan**; Evelyn Gow 吴惠玲 – Happy Maid 幸福小女人; Hon Sher Ee 潘雪忆 – It's a Small World 国记交意所; Loong Li Li 龙俐利 – Fashion Asia 亚洲时尚风; Tay Lay Tin 郑丽贞 – Singapore Flavours 万里香; Teo Kim Kee 张琴棋 – Live a Life U质人生 |
| **Best Title Design (Variety/Info-Ed) 最佳片头设计（综艺节目）**: **Tay Choon Loong 郑春龙 – Housewives Pte Ltd 主妇的春天**; Ong Kian Ming 王建铭 – Singapore Flavours 万里香; Ong Kian Ming 王建铭 – Destination Most Wanted 优游天下; Chiu Wei Kwang 邱伟光 – Let's Party With Food VII 食福满人间VII; Tay Choon Loong 郑春龙 – Fashion Asia 亚洲时尚风 | **Best Programme Promo 最佳宣传短片**: **Danny Loh Boon Kiat 罗文杰 – Growing Up Girl 相信积蓄力量，鼓励释放潜能**; **Ng Wan Ching 王琬君 – Don't Forget the Lyrics! Audition Promo 我要唱下去！ 甄选宣传片**; Chan Hsueh Li 陈雪丽 – Perfect Cut 2 一切完美2; Chen Meling 陈美伶 – September Double Bonus 九月双喜临门; Howe Choon Jin 何宗锦 – The Wedding 芳心有李; Kee Chee Wee 纪志威 – Food Hometown 2 美食寻根2; Loo Li Min 卢俐敏 –The Ultimatum 双子星; Ng Wan Churn 黄婉琛 – Your Hand in Mine 想握你的手 |
| **Best Set Design (Variety/Info-ed) 最佳美术设计（综艺节目）**: **Tay Siu Whye 郑秀怀 – 3-Plus-1 (Season 2) 三菜一汤2**; Annie Chua Yi Jun 蔡宜君 – ComChest Charity Show 2010 公益献爱心; Justin Lee Zhen An 李振安 – CelebriTEA Break (Season 2) 艺点心思2; Mohd B Abdul Rahim – Star Awards 2009 Post Show Party 红星大奖2009 庆功宴; Tay Siu Whye 郑秀怀 – Community Chest Charity Show 2010 公益献爱心; Xu Ying Ying 徐盈盈 – The SPD Charity Show 2009 真情无障爱 | **Best Variety Producer 最佳综艺编导**: **Alfred Yeo 杨居辐 – 3-Plus-1 (Season 1) 三菜一汤**; Gan Bee Khim 颜美琴 – Live a Life U质人生; Kerlin Teo 张晓娜 – King of Thrift 3 省钱王出城记; Mandy Tan 陈桂辉 – Campus SuperStar 3 Grand Finals 校园Superstar 2009总决赛; Tan Moon Hwa 陈玟桦 – Lunar New Year's Eve Special 2009 牛转乾坤喜临门; Khow Hwai Teng 邱慧婷 – The SPD Charity Show 2009 真情无障爱 |
**Best Variety Cameraman 最佳摄影 (综艺节目)**: **Thong Weng Leong 唐荣亮 – Fashion Asia 亚洲时尚风**; Chris Siew 萧嘉耀 – My Star Guide 4 我的导游是明星4; Ler Leong Poh 吕良宝 – On The Beat 4 都是大发现4; Thong Weng Leong 唐荣亮 – Destination Most Wanted 优游天下; William Tan 陈伟联 – Live a Life U质人生
**Best News Story 最佳新闻报道**: **Ng Lian Cheong 吴俍㬕 – Raid of illegal purchasing of cigarettes 突击私烟贩卖活动**; Evelyn Lam Li Ting 蓝丽婷 – Petrol Prices Promotions and Traffic Congestion 汽油促销，交通阻塞; Liang Kai Xin 梁凯欣 – Higher Interest in Purchasing Gold Bars 购金条，赚取高利; Lip Kwok Wai 聂国威 – Capture of Mas Selamat 回祈团头目落网; Tay Cheng Xiang 郑景祥 – Interview with Seng Han Thong 成汉通烧伤专访
**Best Current Affairs Story 最佳时事报道**: **Lynne Chee** 徐赟羚 **– Frontline** 前线追踪 **– Obsessive–compulsive disorder**; Chun Guek Lay 曾月丽 – Focus 焦点 – Seng Han Thong Burning Experience 成汉通的烧伤磨难; Eg Yik Fan 吴益帆 – Money Week 财经追击 – Innovator Series 创业系列; Grace Yang Hsiao Hung 杨晓红 and Ng Toh Heong 黄卓雄 – Focus 焦点 – Typhoon Morakot 莫拉克台风肆虐台湾; Leck Chye Peng 陆彩萍 and Eugene Lim 林锦成 – Frontline 前线追踪 – The aunt of textile printing 印花嫂

==== Awards eligible for audience voting ====
The online voting for Favourite Male & Female Character was revealed on 18 March 2010, and were closed on 18 April, at 9pm. Voting for other categories closed at 8.15pm.

| **Favourite Male Character 最喜爱男角色**: **Nat Ho – The Dream Catchers as Lin Jiajie** 林佳杰; Dennis Chew 周崇庆 – Paris and Milan 女王本色 as Foreigner 老外; Dai Xiangyu 戴向宇 – Together 当我们同在一起 as Lin Xiaobei 林小杯; Huang Wenyong 黄文永 – The A-Go-Go Princess 穿越阿哥哥 as Bao Zugong 包租公; Elvin Ng 黄俊雄 – Together 当我们同在一起 as Huang Zhihao 黄志豪; Thomas Ong 王沺裁 – Perfect Cut 2 一切完美2 as Alex Tan; Tay Ping Hui 郑斌辉 – Baby Bonus 添丁发财 as Li Jiacheng 李家成; Lawrence Wong 王冠逸 – The Promise 向日葵的约定 as Chen Wenyuan 陈文远; Ben Yeo 杨志龙 – King of Thrift 3 省钱王出城记 as Thrift King 猫王; Jerry Yeo 杨伟烈 – The Ultimatum 双子星 as Ye Rende 叶仁德 | **Favourite Female Character 最喜爱女角色**: **Jeanette Aw 欧萱 – Together 当我们同在一起 as Yao Jianhong 姚剑虹**; Dennis Chew 周崇庆 – Paris and Milan 女王本色 as Auntie Lucy; Felicia Chin 陈凤玲 – Baby Bonus 添丁发财 as Huang Liping 黄丽萍; Felicia Chin 陈凤玲 – Love Blossoms II 心花朵朵开II as Tao Haitong 陶海桐; Felicia Chin 陈凤玲 – The Ultimatum 双子星 as Sun Min 孙敏; Jesseca Liu 刘子绚 – The Dream Catchers 未来不是梦 as Lin Jiale 林佳乐; Rui En 瑞恩 – The Dream Catchers 未来不是梦 as Lin Jiaqi 林佳琪; Rui En 瑞恩 – My School Daze 书包太重 as Zhang Luoyun 张洛芸; Michelle Tay 郑荔分 – Perfect Cut 2 一切完美2 as Wu Xiaoli 吴晓莉; Fann Wong 范文芳 – The Ultimatum 双子星 as Fang Songqiao 方宋乔 |
| **Male Media Darling 媒体最喜爱男艺人**: **Dai Xiangyu**; Dennis Chew; Mark Lee; Guo Liang; Zheng Geping | **Female Media Darling 媒体最喜爱女艺人**: **Joanne Peh**; Fann Wong; Kym Ng; Quan Yi Fong |
**Unforgettable Villain 最难忘电视大反派**: **Jerry Yeo 杨伟烈 – The Ultimatum 双子星 as Ye Rende 叶仁德**; Chen Tianwen 陈天文 – Love Blossoms II 心花朵朵开2 as Lu Gua 卢瓜; Patricia Mok 莫小玲 – Love Blossoms II 心花朵朵开2 as Yun Caixia 云彩霞; Constance Song 宋怡霏 – The Ultimatum 双子星 as Jiang Ruolin 蒋若琳; Desmond Tan 陈泂江 – Together 当我们同在一起 as Lin Dehua 林德华

==== Special awards ====
===== Rocket award =====
The Rocket award, debuting this year, was given to the artiste with the most improvement in the performance of his/her respective field of profession for the past year.

| **Rocket Award** **年度飞跃奖** | **Elvin Ng** **黄俊雄** |

==== Viewership awards ====
Unlike previous awards, only the shows with the highest viewerships (for Drama Serial and Variety/Info-Ed Programmes, respectively) were listed and awarded.

| **Top Rated Variety Programme 2009** **最高收视率综艺节目 2009** | **The Wedding** **芳心有李** |
| **Top Rated Drama Serial 2009** **最高收视率电视剧 2009** | **Housewives' Holiday** |

=== Show 2 ===
Winners and nominees:

| **Best Drama Serial 最佳电视剧**: **Together 当我们同在一起**; Daddy at Home 企鹅爸爸; Housewives' Holiday 煮妇的假期; Perfect Cut 2 一切完美2; Reunion Dinner 团圆饭 | **Best Variety Programme 最佳综艺节目**: **It's a Small World 国记交意所**; 3-Plus-1 (Season 2) 三菜一汤II; CelebriTEA Break (Season 2) 艺点心思2; Destination Most Wanted 优游天下; Paris and Milan 女王本色 |
| **Best Variety Special 最佳综艺特备节目**: **The Chinese Challenge Grand Finals 华文？谁怕谁！总决赛**; Campus SuperStar 3 Grand Finals 校园Superstar 2009总决赛; The SPD Charity Show 2009 真情无障爱; Star Awards 2009 红星大奖2009; The Little Nyonya Reunion Special 小娘惹大团圆 | **Best Actor 最佳男主角**: **Chen Hanwei 陈汉玮 – Daddy at Home 企鹅爸爸**; Dai Yang Tian 戴阳天 – Together 当我们同在一起; Elvin Ng 黄俊雄 – Together 当我们同在一起; Tay Ping Hui 郑斌辉 – The Ultimatum 双子星; Brandon Wong 黄炯耀 – Housewives' Holiday 煮妇的假期 |
| **Best Actress 最佳女主角**: **Chen Liping 陈莉萍 – Reunion Dinner 团圆饭**; Jeanette Aw 欧萱 – Together 当我们同在一起; Hong Huifang 洪慧芳 – Housewives' Holiday 煮妇的假期; Ann Kok 郭舒贤 – Housewives' Holiday 煮妇的假期; Eelyn Kok 郭蕙雯 – Together 当我们同在一起 | **Best Supporting Actor 最佳男配角**: **Zhu Houren 朱厚任 – Reunion Dinner 团圆饭**; Darren Lim 林明伦 – My School Daze 书包太重; Jerry Yeo 杨伟烈 – The Ultimatum 双子星; Zheng Geping 郑各评 – Together 当我们同在一起; Zhang Zhen Huan 张振寰 – Together 当我们同在一起 |
| **Best Supporting Actress 最佳女配角**: **Constance Song – The Ultimatum**; Paige Chua – The Dream Catchers; Hong Huifang –Together; Aileen Tan – Together; Xiang Yun – Baby Bonus | **Best Variety Show Host 最佳综艺主持人**: **Mark Lee – It's A Small World** 国记交意所; Dennis Chew – Paris & Milan; Guo Liang – CelebriTea Break 2 艺点心思2; Lee Teng – On The Beat 4 都是大发现4; Quan Yi Fong – Buzzing Cashiers 2 抢摊大行动2 |
| **Best Info-Ed Show Host 最佳资讯主持人**: **Bryan Wong – Food Hometown 2 美食寻根2**; Chew Chor Meng – Food Hometown 2 美食寻根2; Michelle Chia – Stars for a Cause 明星志工队; Guo Liang – Stars for a Cause 明星志工队; Pornsak – Stars for a Cause 明星志工队 | **Best News Anchor 最佳新闻主播**: **Zhao Wenbei**; Lin Chi Yuan 林启元; Ng Siew Leng 黄秀玲; Tung Soo Hua; Zhang Haijie |
**Best Current Affairs Presenter 最佳时事节目主持人**: **Chun Guek Lay 曾月丽 – Focus 焦点**; Desmond Lim 林树源 – Good Morning Singapore! 早安您好; Qi Qi 琪琪 – Good Morning Singapore 早安您好; Tung Soo Hua 董素华 – Money Week 财经追击; Youyi 有懿 – Good Morning Singapore! 早安您好

==== All Time Favourite Artiste ====
This award is a special achievement award given out to artiste(s) who have achieved a maximum of 10 popularity awards over 10 years. Top 10 winning years the recipients were awarded together are highlighted in boldface.

| **All Time Favourite Artiste** **超级红星** | **Christopher Lee** | 1997 | **1998** | 2000 | **2002** | **2003** | **2004** | **2005** | **2006** | **2007** | **2009** |
| **All Time Favourite Artiste** **超级红星** | **Mark Lee** | **1998** | 1999 | 2001 | **2002** | **2003** | **2004** | **2005** | **2006** | **2007** | **2009** |

==== Awards eligible for audience voting ====
The nominations for Top 10 Most Popular Male & Female Artistes were announced and started on 18 March 2010, and ended on 25 April at 9pm.

===== Top 10 Most Popular Artistes =====
**Top 10 Most Popular Male Artists 十大最受欢迎男艺人**
| **Zhang Yao Dong 张耀栋** | 2 |
| Dai Yang Tian 戴阳天 | 1 |
| **Qi Yuwu 戚玉武** | 6 |
| **Tay Ping Hui 郑斌辉** | 9 |
| **Guo Liang 郭亮** | 4 |
| Pornsak | |
| **Elvin Ng 黄俊雄** | 4 |
| Shaun Chen 陈泓宇 | |
| Huang Wen Yong 黄文永 | |
| Dasmond Koh 许振荣 | |
| Pierre Png 方展发 | |
| **Zheng Ge Ping 郑各评** | 2 |
| Gurmit Singh 葛米星 | |
| **Chen Han Wei 陈汉玮** | 7 |
| Zhu Houren 朱厚任 | |
| Chen Shucheng 陈澍城 | |
| Joshua Ang 洪赐健 | |
| **Dennis Chew 周崇庆** | 1 |
| Terence Cao 曹国辉 | |
| **Bryan Wong 王禄江** | 7 |
**Top 10 Most Popular Female Artistes 十大最受欢迎女艺人**
| Kym Ng 鐘琴 | |
| **Felicia Chin 陈靓瑄** | 4 |
| Pan Ling Ling 潘玲玲 | |
| Belinda Lee 李心钰 | |
| Ann Kok 郭舒贤 | |
| Pei Xuan 蔡佩璇 | |
| **Jesseca Liu 刘芷绚** | 4 |
| Priscelia Chan 曾诗梅 | |
| **Michelle Chia 谢韵仪** | 5 |
| **Yvonne Lim 林湘萍** | 3 |
| **Rui En 瑞恩** | 5 |
| Michelle Chong 庄米雪 | |
| Jin Yinji 金银姬 | |
| **Joanne Peh 白薇秀** | 4 |
| Hong Huifang 洪慧芳 | |
| Lin Meijiao 林梅娇 | |
| **Xiang Yun 向云** | **10** |
| **Quan Yi Fong 权怡凤** | 5 |
| **Vivian Lai 赖怡伶** | 6 |
| **Jeanette Aw 欧萱** | 6 |

== Presenters and performers ==
The following individuals presented awards or performed musical numbers.

=== Show 1 ===
Presenters
| Name(s) | Role |
|---|---|
| Kelvin Tong; Sam Wen 文树森 | Presented Best Variety Research Writer and Best Screenplay |
| Huang Wenyong; Jin Yinji | Presented Young Talent Award |
| Hong Huifang; Ann Kok; Xiang Yun | Presented Best News Story and Best Current Affairs Story |
| Chen Liping; Tay Ping Hui | Presented Best Art Design |
| Chen Hanwei 陈汉玮; Zheng Geping 郑各评 | Presented Best Info-Ed Programme |
| Chew Chor Meng 周初明; Royston Tan 陈子谦 | Presented Best Cameraman |
| Richard Ng 吴耀汉 | Presented Most Unforgettable Villain |
| Ah Niu 阿牛 (陈庆祥); Lee Wei Song 李伟菘 | Presented Best Theme Song |
| Vice-President, MediaCorp (Television); Chang Long Jong 章能容 | Presented Best Variety Producer and Best Director |
| Mark Lee 李国煌; Li Nanxing 李南星 | Presented Male Media Darling and Female Media Darling |
| CEO, MediaCorp; Lucas Chow 周永强 | Presented Top Rated Variety Programme and Top Rated Drama Serial |
| Fann Wong 范文芳; Sung Yimin 宋逸民; James Chen 陈宇风 | Presented Favourite Male Artiste and Favourite Female Artiste |
| Senior Parliamentary Secretary, Ministry of Community Development, Youth and Sports and Transport; Teo Ser Luck 张思乐 | Presented Rocket Award |

Performers
| Name(s) | Performed |
|---|---|
| Everyone's at the Party | Performed "点爆八方" |
| Most Unforgettable Villain Nominees | Presented a comedian skit |
| Ah Niu 阿牛 (陈庆祥) | Performed "桃花朵朵开" and "纯文艺恋爱" |
| Lim Sau-hoong 林少芬 | Presented Best Title Design and Best Programme Promo |
| Terence Cao 曹国辉; Apple Hong 洪乙心; Zhang Zhenhuan 张振寰; Nat Ho 鹤天赐; Wayne Chua 蔡佩璇; Sun Xiangde 孙祥德 | Performed comedic skits Our Family of Freaks (怪胎一家人) and Matrix ping pong |
| Kelvin Tan 陈伟联 | Performed "我们" |
| Nominees of Best Variety Programme | Presented comedic skit |

=== Show 2 ===
| Artistes / Special guests | Presented / Performed |
|---|---|
| Christopher Doyle 杜可風; Tsai Yueh-Hsun 蔡岳勋 | Presented Best Drama Serial |
| Godfrey Gao 高以翔; Sam Tseng 曾国城 | Presented Best Variety Programme and Best Variety Special |
| Paul S.D Lee 李四端 | Presented Best News Presenter and Best Current Affairs Presenter |
| Lin Hsiu-Ling 林秀玲; Elsie Yeh 叶全真 | Presented Best Supporter Actor and Best Supporting Actress |
| Regine Li 利菁; Sam Wang 王少伟 | Presented Best Info-ed Programme Host and Best Variety Show Host |
| JJ Lin 林俊杰 | Performed "无法克制" |
| CEO, MediaCorp; Lucas Chow 周永强; Deputy Prime Minister and Minister for Defence; Teo Chee Hean 张志贤 | Gave out All-Time Favourite Artiste |
| Susanna Kwan 关菊英; Michelle Yim 米雪 | Presented Best Actor and Best Actress |
| Sam Tseng 曾国城; Cheryl Yang 杨瑾华 | Presented Top 10 Most Favourite Male Artistes |
| Mark Chao 赵又廷; Regine Li 利菁 | Presented Top 10 Most Favourite Female Artistes |

== Accolades ==
| Organisation | Year | Accolade | Nominee(s) | Representative work | Result | Ref. |
|---|---|---|---|---|---|---|
| Star Awards | 2011 | Best Variety Research Writer | Glen Lim 林祥平 | —N/a | Nominated | |
| Star Awards | 2011 | Best Variety Special | —N/a | —N/a | Won | |

== See also ==
- MediaCorp Channel 8
- MediaCorp Channel U
- Star Awards
