= Tung Soo Hua =

Singaporean news anchor and presenter

- 董素华
- Born: 22 November 1974 (age 51)
- Education: National University of Singapore (BS, MSS)
- Occupations: News anchor; presenter
- Years active: 1997–present
- Employer: Mediacorp
- Height: 1.65 m (5 ft 5 in)
- Website: https://www.facebook.com/soohuatung http://tungism.wordpress.com

Tung Soo Hua (Chinese: 董素华; pinyin: Dǒng Sùhúa; born 22 November 1974) is a Singaporean news anchor and presenter contracted under Mediacorp.

== Career ==
Tung is a television news anchor and current affairs presenter with MediaCorp TV Channel 8 and Channel U. Tung joined Mediacorp in 1997 as a Chinese-language news editor before becoming a news reporter and anchor in 2000.

Having fronted Mediacorp Channel 8 news programmes such as Singapore Today, Singapore Today Roving News, News 8 at Ten, Money Week and World This Week, Tung has interviewed over 70 chief executive officers and head honchos of listed companies, reaffirming her accomplishment as the show host of Singapore's leading Chinese-language financial television programme.

In her 15-year career as journalist, Tung has covered major events including APEC, ASEAN summits, World Bank/IMF meetings and Singapore's General Elections between 2001 and 2015. Most recently, she hosted "Singapore General Election 2015", a seven-hour mega "live" show telecast on Channel 8.

Tung extended her role of a business news presenter by hosting the annual Budget Forums between 2002 and 2015. The program is a much-watched event which follows right after the Finance Minister's Budget Statement in Parliament.

She also served the role of Mandarin commentator for the 'live' coverage of National Day Parade 10 times between 2002 and 2015. The program is an annual 3-hour mega show on Singapore's National Day.

Tung won the Best Chinese-language News Presenter award for Star Awards in 2004, 2005, 2006, 2007, 2009, 2011, 2012 and 2013 Star Awards.

== Education ==
Tung attended Nanyang Girls' High School and National Junior College before graduating from the National University of Singapore with a Bachelor of Science with first honours degree in mathematics. She subsequently went on to complete a Master of Social Sciences degree in international studies.

== Awards and nominations ==
Organisation	Year	Award	Nominated work Title	Result	Ref
Star Awards	2000	Best News / Current Affairs Presenter	News 8 at Ten	Nominated	
Star Awards	2001	Best News / Current Affairs Presenter	News 8 at Ten	Nominated	
Star Awards	2002	Best News / Current Affairs Presenter	News 8 at Ten	Nominated	
Star Awards	2003	Best News / Current Affairs Presenter	News 8 at Ten	Nominated	
Star Awards	2004	Best News / Current Affairs Presenter	Singapore Today	Won	
Star Awards	2005	Best News / Current Affairs Presenter	Money Week	Won	
Star Awards	2006	Best News / Current Affairs Presenter	News World @ 11	Won	
Star Awards	2007	Best News / Current Affairs Presenter	News World @ 11	Won	
Star Awards	2009	Best News / Current Affairs Presenter	News World @ 11	Won	
Star Awards	2010	Best News Presenter	News World @ 11	Nominated	
Star Awards	2010	Best Current Affairs Presenter	Money Week	Nominated	
Star Awards	2011	Best News Presenter	News Tonight	Nominated	
Star Awards	2011	Best Current Affairs Presenter	Money Week	Won	
Star Awards	2012	Best News Presenter	News Tonight	Won	
Star Awards	2012	Best Current Affairs Presenter	Money Week	Nominated	
Star Awards	2013	Best News Presenter	News Tonight	Nominated	
Star Awards	2013	Best Current Affairs Presenter	Money Week	Won	
Star Awards	2021	Best Programme Host	Be My Guest S2	Nominated	
National University of Singapore	2011	Outstanding Science Alumni	N/A	Won	
National University of Singapore	2011	Outstanding Young Alumni	N/A	Won	
