= Star Awards =

Singaporean media awards

Star Awards 红星大奖
- Current: Star Awards 2026
- Star Awards Trophy
- Awarded for: Excellence in Chinese Language entertainment in Singapore
- Country: Singapore
- Presented by: Mediacorp
- First award: 26 February 1994; 32 years ago

Television/radio coverage
- Network: Mediacorp Channel 8 Mediacorp Channel U meWATCH; YouTube

Star Awards (Chinese: 红星大奖) are awards for artistic and technical merit where Mediacorp recognises entertainers under their employment for outstanding performances of the year.

== History ==
The first Star Awards ceremony was held on 26 February 1994 at the Caldecott Broadcast Centre Mediacorp TV Theatre, with an audience of approximately 500 people. A total of 16 awards were presented during the ceremony, inclusive of Top 5 Most Popular Male Artistes and Female Artistes, Most Popular Male Newcomer and Female Newcomer, Most Popular Drama Serial and Most Popular Theme Song. The Most Popular Male Artiste and Female Artiste were then awarded to a final winner from the Top 5 Most Popular Male and Female Artistes accordingly. Li Nanxing and Zoe Tay were the first winners of The Most Popular Male Artiste and Female Artiste. Most Popular Drama Serial went to The Unbeatables I.

=== Milestones ===
In 1995, professional awards were included, such as the Best Actor, Best Actress awards. Li Nanxing and Fann Wong won the inaugural Best Actor and Best Actress awards.

The Special Achievement Award was also introduced with Xiang Yun being first awarded. The award was given until 2003 before it was reintroduced in 2018

In 1996, the Best Drama Serial was introduced and Tofu Street won it for an outstanding overall performance. The nominees are determined by a team of judges employed by Mediacorp and winners are selected by a majority vote from the entire judging panel. Chew Chor Meng, Li Nanxing, Terence Cao, Sean Say, Desmond Sim, Chen Liping, Chen Xiuhuan, Pan Lingling, Aileen Tan, and Zoe Tay received the award as the 10 Most Popular Artistes, with five awards given to male and female artistes; these artistes were awarded by popularity among the television audience based from the public via telephone and SMS text voting. Since 1997, the number of recipients for each category were expanded to ten.

During the 1998 ceremony, variety categories were introduced to include variety programs and the hosts.

In 2008, the ceremony was postponed to April 2009. Prior to 2008, the ceremony was held at the end of the year for shows broadcast during the year. As nominations might be late for those being shown at the end of the year, the ceremony was postponed to include all the shows broadcast for the previous year.

In 2004, the Special Achievement Award was removed and a new award, All-Time Favourite Artiste, was introduced. Artistes who had won the Top 10 Most Popular Male or Female Artiste awards ten times would no longer be eligible to contest the award again and will be conferred with the All-Time Favourite Artiste award instead.

==== 2010–2020s ====
- The 2010 ceremony introduced new awards like Favourite Male Character and Female Characters and the Rocket Award, focusing on artistes' contributions and improvement.
- The Honorary TV Award was posthumously presented at the 2013 ceremony to Huang Wenyong who had died the day before the first show.
- 20th Star Awards ceremony in 2014 introduced the Social Media Award and The Most Popular Regional Artiste Award. 2014 saw revisions in award category quotas, affecting the presentation of certain awards like Best News Presenter and Best Newcomer.
- The 2015 ceremonies marked the last time they were held at the Caldecott Broadcast Centre before moving to the Mediacorp campus. During Show 1 of the presentation, Jeanette Aw emerged as a major winner, securing victories across the majority of categories that night.
- The 2016 ceremony saw changes in award presentation and the last occurrence of online Favourite award categories and the first cremeony which introduced the Best Evergreen Artiste Award. A new category, 'Best Programme Host', was created with a merger of two hosting awards (Best Variety Show Host and Best Info-Ed Programme Host) due to a similar presentation style in both the variety and info-ed programmes, as well as similar eligibility criteria. The technical categories were moved to the backstage during the 2016 ceremony. Consequently, these significant aspects of the event were omitted from the broadcast, limiting the recognition and appreciation of the technical excellence displayed by the nominees and winners in their respective fields.
- At the 2017 ceremony, online voting categories were also streamlined, by putting more emphasis placed on the Top 10 Most Popular Artiste awards, while the Favourite Male and Female Character, and Favourite Onscreen Couple awards, as well as Social Media Award were dropped due to the change. Due to the switch in measuring television viewership, the Top Rated Variety Programme and Top Rated Drama Serial awards were also suspended.
- The 2018 ceremony saw revamps towards the Top 10 Popularity Awards, whereas a poll of 1,000 people representing a wide demographic across Singapore's population, were conducted independently by an accredited market research company, will be used to shortlist the nominations. The results of the poll weighed 50% towards the combined total, while the other 50% comes from the public vote (with 50% weighed on telepoll and online votes each). Eligibility criteria for performance and popularity categories were also revised, opening up to non-Mediacorp artistes; eligible artistes were now required to lead a role in a programme or play as a supporting role/assistant host in at least three eligible programmes or at least 30 episodes out of all eligible programmes, whichever applicable. Best Evergreen Artiste were also accessed on veteran artistes based on a full calendar year, as opposed to a single programme. The Special Achievement Award was reinstated in lieu of the All-Time Favourite Artiste as there were no eligible artistes who had won their 10th Top 10 Most Popular Artistes award at the previous ceremony.
- The 2019 ceremony, coinciding the silver jubilee of the ceremony on 14 April 2019, introduced two categories to feature miniseries, which were the Best Short-form Drama Serial and Best Short-form Variety Programme. The Honorary TV Award was not presented that year despite the death of Aloysius Pang, who had died earlier on 23 January that year.

==== 2020–present ====
- The 2021 ceremony, initially announced to be held on 26 April 2020 and announced that the event is postponed to the second half of 2020 due to the ongoing COVID-19 pandemic, making it the first ceremony in 13 years since the revision of the eligibility period in 2008 where the ceremony would not be held on the month of April; On 7 August 2020, the ceremony was pushed to 18 April 2021 and expanding the eligibility to include 2020 programs, resulting in the increase of nominations for most of the award categories, from the traditional five to seven. The ceremony also introduces radio awards coinciding the 85th anniversary of radio broadcasting in Singapore. For the first time since 2014, the award ceremony was announced to be held outside studios, located on the Jewel Changi Airport and Terminal 4.^{3}
- The 2022 ceremony saw the launch of the My Pick! Awards; Favourite Couple Pairing (CP), the Male Show Stealer, the Female Show Stealer, Most Hated Villain, Perfect Combo and Most Attention-Seeking New Gen Host. The awards were given out during the Backstage Live segment of the 2022 ceremony.
- The award ceremonies held in 2022, 2023 and 2026 ended with the presentation of the Best Actor and Actress award, but recent ceremonies' last award would be Top 10 Most Popular Male or Female Artistes award, a popularity contest open for all eligible nominated artistes regardless of their talent management agency.^{1}
- The 2023 ceremony saw introductions of the Most Popular Rising Star award and revamps towards the Top 10 Popularity Awards. Nominees are no longer shortlisted into the Top 40 nominees, instead they are eligible as long as they have acted in a Lead role or main host in an eligible programme or a Supporting role or episodic host in 3 eligible programme/30 episodes in total across all eligible programme, while having more than 5 years of professional screen acting and/or screen/audio hosting experience before the award ceremony, Most Popular Rising Star have similar requirements, but they can be nominated with being a Supporting role or episodic host in a single eligible programme, while having 5 or less years of professional screen acting and/or screen/audio hosting (excluding cameo appearances/experiences before turning 18 years of age), and being at least 18 years of age to be nominated.
- Star Awards 2024 marks the removal of the Best Evergreen Artiste Award by Mediacorp, and believes that artistic excellence transcends age. As a result, veteran artistes are now valued based on their contributions across various acting and program categories in the nominations. Additionally, Mediacorp introduced a new category during this year's awards ceremony: "Best Audio Personality," aimed at recognizing outstanding hosts in the audio industry. This initiative aims to provide greater opportunities for DJs and audio presenters to participate and be acknowledged for their contributions.
- Star Awards 2025 marked the second time in 30 years that Chow Yun-fat was invited to the ceremony to present the Most Popular Artiste award. It also marked a historic milestone, as the Best Actress accolade was awarded for the first time to a non-Mediacorp artiste and non-Singaporean — Jessica Hsuan. Meanwhile, Christopher Lee emerged as the biggest winner of the night, taking home three awards and making history in the process.

== Theme tune ==
Since 1995, the signature theme tune titled "Linking the World", composed by Christopher Evans. It was subsequently modified to have different renditions of the same tune for subsequent ceremonies.

Since 2019, the original theme tune was re-composed as "Starlight" 《星光》, with a new rendition and lyrics. This new rendition was used as the opener for the ceremony since 2021.

== Trophy ==
Since its establishment in 1994, the Star Awards trophy has undergone four distinct design changes, with a fifth introduced in 2025

- 1994: The trophy featured a transparent column topped with a silver, multi-faceted star.
- 1995 to 1997: The trophy consisted of a column topped with a gold star.
- 1998 to 1999: The trophy took on a conical shape with a large star.
- 2000 to present: Designed in Shanghai, each trophy weighs 4 kilograms and is valued at $1000. Its design is formed by the crystalline shape of the letter "S," which, when viewed from another angle, resembles the letter "A," forming the abbreviation for "Star Awards." The trophy's color varies each year (green, purple, gold, brown, blue, etc.).
- 2025: A special edition of the trophy, crowned with a radiant coat of golden sheen, marks this design with distinction — a gleaming tribute to excellence and legacy.

== List of Star Awards ceremonies ==
Here is a complete list of Mediacorp Star Awards ceremonies.

The latest ceremony, Star Awards 2026, held on 19 April 2026.

=== Venues ===
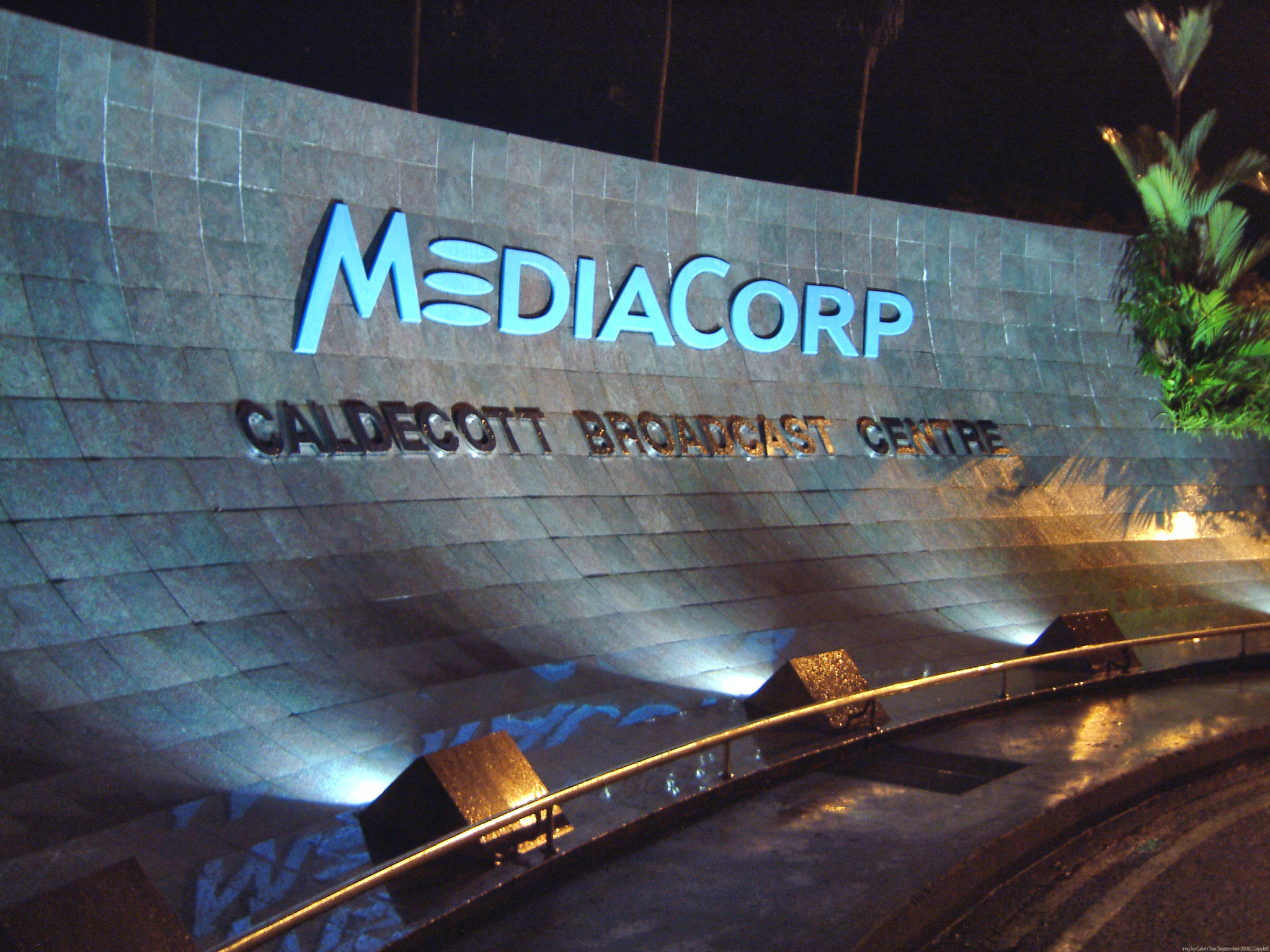
Caldecott Broadcast Centre, Mediacorp TV Theatre

In 1994, the first Star Awards were presented at the Caldecott Broadcast Centre, Mediacorp TV Theatre and the following year until 2015; however, seven ceremonies were held outside the studios: in 1996, the venue of Star Awards changed to World Trade Centre, Harbour Pavilion and was hosted by Guo Liang and Yvette Tsui. In 2006, the ceremony was held at St James Power Station, near VivoCity and Sentosa. Between 2010 and 2014, the ceremony was also held outside location while the show was split into two, with the first show held at Caldecott Hill, while the second show was held at Resorts World Sentosa (2010 and 2011), Marina Bay Sands (2012 and 2013) and Suntec City (2014).

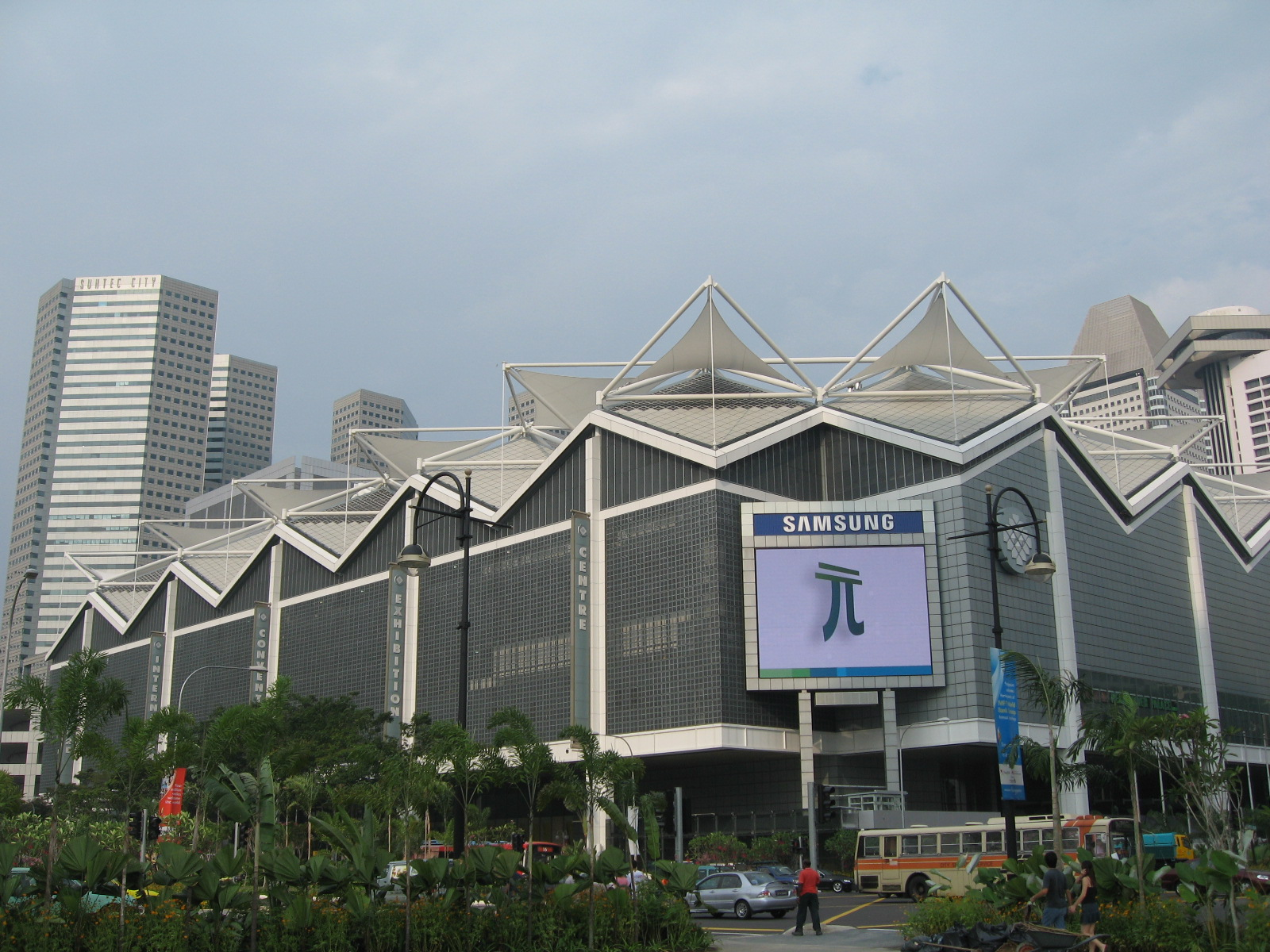
Suntec City (2014)

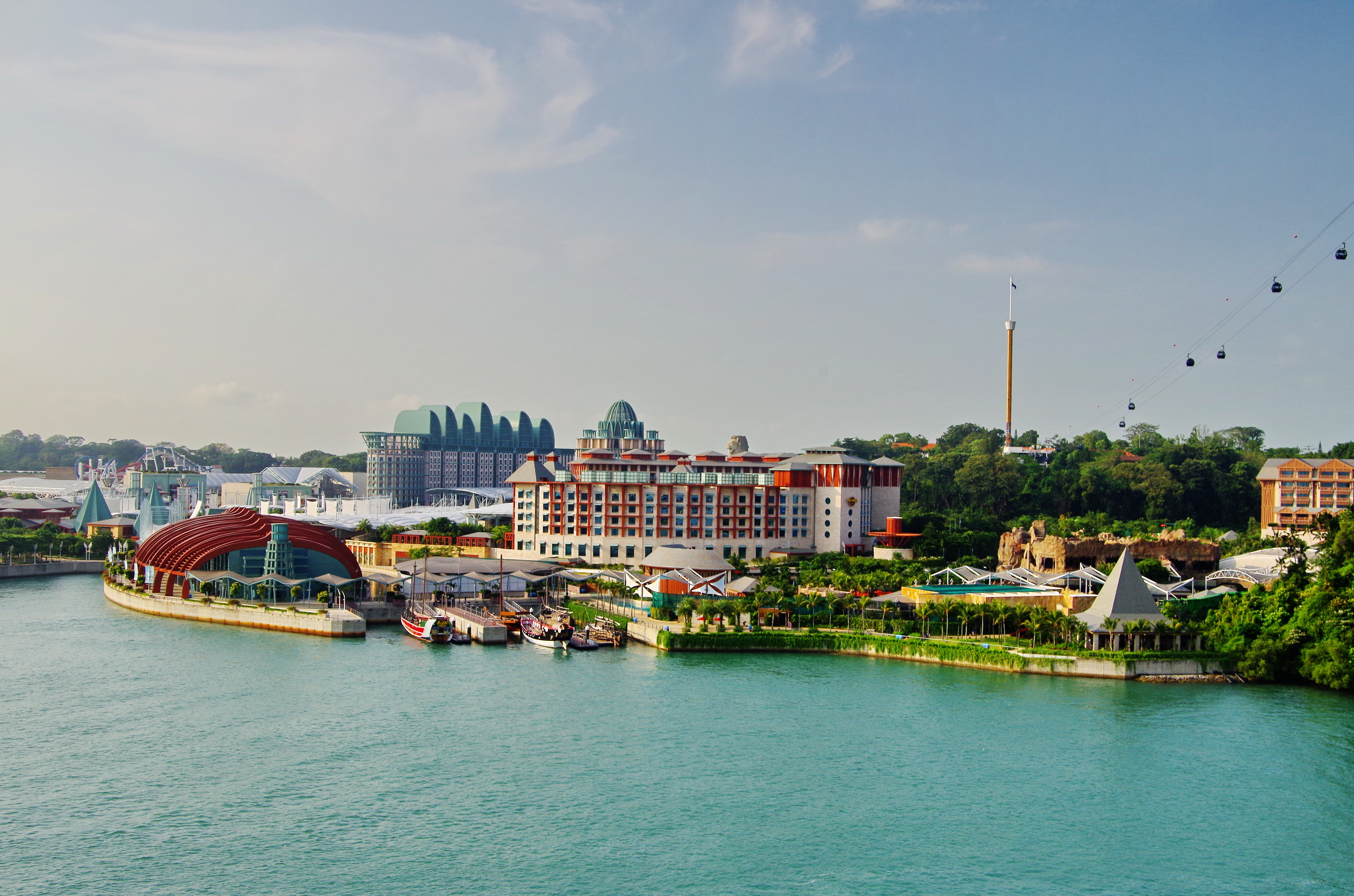
Resorts World Sentosa (2010, 2011)

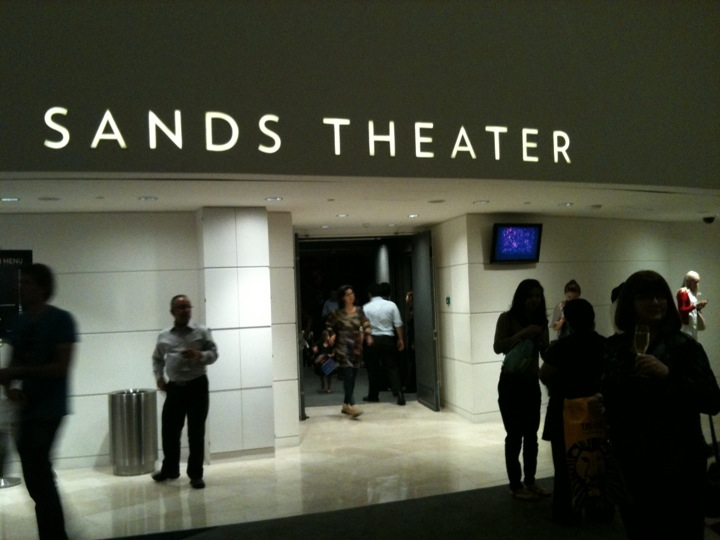
Mastercard Theatre (2013, 2023)

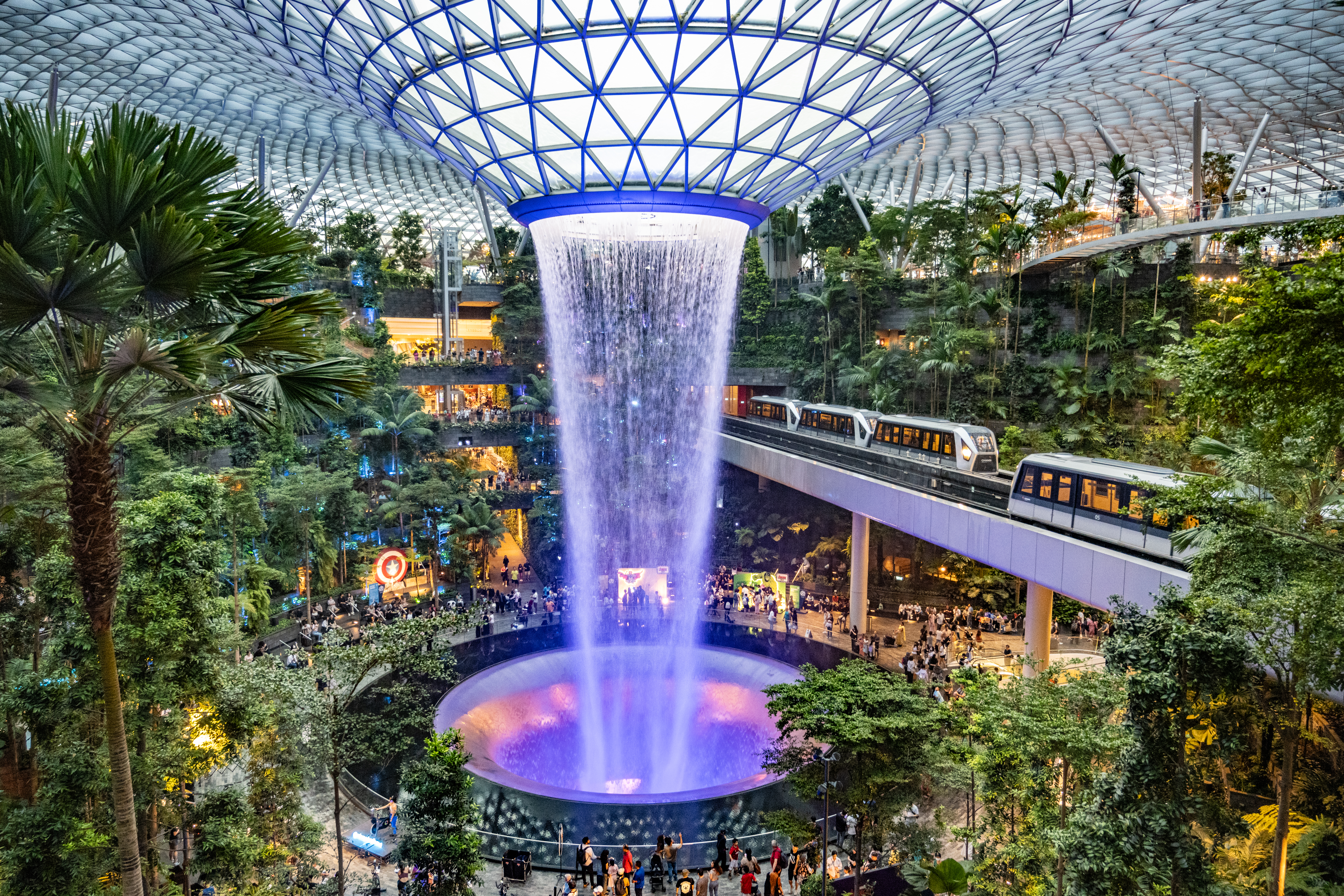
Changi Airport Terminal 4 (2021)

In 2016, the awards had since held at the new Mediacorp Campus, MES Theatre @ Mediacorp, and it became the presentation's current venue. The 1,500-seater performance venue features tiered seating in its stalls, and two circle levels, including removable seats at the lower stall and additional audience sitting space at the orchestra pit for people with special needs. However, two other ceremonies that are held outside the studios, making the tradition of holding the ceremonies outside the studios being brought back after a 9 year hiatus and 5 years after the new theatre was opened. The 2021 was held in Jewel Changi Airport and Changi Airport Terminal 4 while the 2023 ceremony was held in Marina Bay Sands for the third time, after 10 years.

Lists of Mediacorp Star Awards venues:

- 1994–1995: Mediacorp TV Theatre
- 1996: World Trade Centre, Singapore
- 1997–1999: MediaCorp Caldecott Broadcast Centre
- 2000–2005, 2007, 2009: MediaCorp TV Theatre
- 2006: St James Power Station, Powerhouse
- 2010–2014 (Show 1): MediaCorp TV Theatre
- 2010–2011 (Show 2): Resorts World Sentosa, Compass Ballroom
- 2012 (Show 2): Marina Bay Sands, Sands Ballroom
- 2013 (Show 2): Marina Bay Sands, MasterCard Theatres
- 2014 (Show 2): Suntec City, Suntec Singapore Convention & Exhibition Centre
- 2015: MediaCorp Caldecott Broadcast Centre
- 2016–2019, 2022, 2024–present: MES Theatre @ Mediacorp
- 2021: Jewel Changi Airport, Changi Terminal 4 (due to COVID-19 restrictions)
- 2023: Marina Bay Sands, MasterCard Theatres

=== Network ===
Networks	Years	# of years
Television Corporation of Singapore (TCS)	1994–1999	6
Mediacorp Channel 8	1999–present	27
Channel U	2007–present	19
meWATCH (Online)	2016–present	10
YouTube (Online)	2018–present	8

The Star Awards were traditionally held in end of the year or December until 2009, when Mediacorp rescheduled the ceremony to April to align with the full calendar-year eligibility period from 1 January to 31 December. This change was primarily influenced by the overwhelming success of "The Little Nyonya" (2008), ensuring that productions from the preceding year were appropriately recognized within the awards cycle.

In 2010, the format of the awards underwent further restructuring with the introduction of two separate ceremonies to better acknowledge various aspects of the television industry. The format of the Star Awards underwent further restructuring with the introduction of two separate televised ceremonies to better acknowledge various aspects of the television industry. "Star Awards Show 1" was established to honor technical achievements, production teams, and backstage contributions, while "Star Awards Show 2" remained the primary televised event, focusing on major performance categories, live entertainment, and the presentation of the most prestigious accolades. This change allowed for a more comprehensive recognition of both on-screen talents and industry professionals working behind the scenes, ensuring that all contributors to Singapore’s television landscape received due recognition. This change allowed for a more comprehensive recognition of both on-screen talents and industry professionals working behind the scenes.

In 2025, Mediacorp revised the Star Awards ceremony schedule to mark its 30th anniversary. Initial speculation suggested the change was to align with the release of The Little Nyonya: Emerald Hill, but this was later disproven when the drama did not appear in the nomination list. 2025 is scheduled to take place on this date to commemorate the special occasion.

When citing each Star Awards ceremony, the convention may either refer to the year of its eligibility period (i.e., the calendar year in which the television programs were broadcast) or the year in which the ceremony was held.

#	Date		Venue		Host(s)				Special Achievement Award	Rocket Award
#	Date		Venue		Main		Walk-of-Fame	Post-Show Party	Special Achievement Award	Rocket Award
1	26 February 1994		Caldecott Broadcast Centre; Mediacorp TV Theatre		Chen Shucheng; Yvette Tsui		—N/a	—N/a	—N/a	—N/a
2	9 July 1995		Caldecott Broadcast Centre; Mediacorp TV Theatre		Guo Liang; Yvette Tsui		—N/a	—N/a	Xiang Yun	—N/a
3	23 June 1996		World Trade Centre; Harbour Pavilion		Guo Liang; Yvette Tsui		—N/a	—N/a	Bai Yan	—N/a
4	5 October 1997		Caldecott Broadcast Centre; Mediacorp TV Theatre		Timothy Chao; Wendy Xiao Ying		—N/a	—N/a	Huang Wenyong	—N/a
5	20 December 1998		Caldecott Broadcast Centre; Mediacorp TV Theatre		Timothy Chao; Yvette Tsui		—N/a	—N/a	Zoe Tay	—N/a
6	19 December 1999		Caldecott Broadcast Centre; Mediacorp TV Theatre		Timothy Chao; Yvette Tsui		—N/a	—N/a	Jack Neo	—N/a
7	26 November 2000		Caldecott Broadcast Centre; Mediacorp TV Theatre		Timothy Chao; Yvette Tsui		—N/a	—N/a	Fann Wong	—N/a
8	25 November 2001		Caldecott Broadcast Centre; Mediacorp TV Theatre		Timothy Chao; Cheng Di		—N/a	—N/a	Lee Shih Shiong; Lee Wei Shiong	—N/a
9	8 December 2002		Caldecott Broadcast Centre; Mediacorp TV Theatre		Timothy Chao; Chun Guek Lay		—N/a	—N/a	Chen Shucheng	—N/a
10	7 December 2003		Caldecott Broadcast Centre; Mediacorp TV Theatre		Timothy Chao; Chun Guek Lay		—N/a	—N/a	Xie Shaoguang	—N/a
11	12 December 2004		Caldecott Broadcast Centre; Mediacorp TV Theatre		Timothy Chao; Matilda Tao		—N/a	—N/a	All-Time Favourite Artiste	—N/a
11	12 December 2004		Caldecott Broadcast Centre; Mediacorp TV Theatre		Timothy Chao; Matilda Tao		—N/a	—N/a	Chew Chor Meng; Li Nanxing; Zoe Tay	—N/a
12	4 December 2005		Caldecott Broadcast Centre; Mediacorp TV Theatre		Guo Liang; Patty Hou		—N/a	Dennis Chew; Dasmond Koh; Lim Peifen	Fann Wong; Xie Shaoguang	—N/a
13	10 December 2006		St James Power Station; Powerhouse		Guo Liang; Patty Hou		Mark Lee; Lim Peifen	Mark Lee; Lim Peifen; Jeff Wang	Chen Liping	—N/a
14	16 December 2007		Caldecott Broadcast Centre; Mediacorp TV Theatre		Sharon Au; Guo Liang; Quan Yi Fong		—N/a	Vivian Lai; Mark Lee; Lim Peifen; Pornsak; Jeff Wang	—N/a	—N/a
15	26 April 2009		Caldecott Broadcast Centre; Mediacorp TV Theatre		Guo Liang; Quan Yi Fong		—N/a	Lee Teng; Charlyn Lin; Pornsak; Yuan Shuai	Huang Biren	—N/a
16	Show 1	Show 2	Show 1	Show 2	Show 1	Show 2	Show 2		Christopher Lee; Mark Lee	Elvin Ng
16	18 April 2010	25 April 2010	Caldecott Broadcast Centre; Mediacorp TV Theatre	Resorts World Sentosa; Compass Ballroom	Dennis Chew; Michelle Chia; Michelle Chong; Vivian Lai; Mark Lee; Lee Teng; Kym Ng; Pornsak	Guo Liang; Quan Yi Fong	Michelle Chong; Vivian Lai; Lee Teng; Pornsak	Michelle Chia; Michelle Chong; Apple Hong; Vivian Lai; Lee Teng; Pornsak	Christopher Lee; Mark Lee	Elvin Ng
17	17 April 2011	24 April 2011	Caldecott Broadcast Centre; Mediacorp TV Theatre	Resorts World Sentosa; Compass Ballroom	Dasmond Koh; Kym Ng; Pornsak; Bryan Wong	Guo Liang; Quan Yi Fong	Dasmond Koh; Vivian Lai; Lee Teng; Pornsak	Dasmond Koh; Lee Teng; Lim Peifen; Pornsak	Xiang Yun	Pornsak
18	22 April 2012	29 April 2012	Caldecott Broadcast Centre; Mediacorp TV Theatre	Marina Bay Sands; Sands Ballroom	Michelle Chia; Dasmond Koh; Vivian Lai; Lee Teng	Guo Liang; Bowie Tsang	Dennis Chew; Dasmond Koh; Lee Teng; Kate Pang	Dasmond Koh; Vivian Lai; Lee Teng	Tay Ping Hui	Desmond Tan
19	21 April 2013	28 April 2013	Caldecott Broadcast Centre; Mediacorp TV Theatre	Marina Bay Sands; MasterCard Theatres	Vivian Lai; Lee Teng; Kate Pang; Pornsak; Jeffrey Xu	Guo Liang; Quan Yi Fong	Dasmond Koh; Vivian Lai; Lee Teng; Kate Pang	Dasmond Koh; Vivian Lai; Lee Teng; Pornsak	Honorary TV Award	Romeo Tan
19	21 April 2013	28 April 2013	Caldecott Broadcast Centre; Mediacorp TV Theatre	Marina Bay Sands; MasterCard Theatres	Vivian Lai; Lee Teng; Kate Pang; Pornsak; Jeffrey Xu	Guo Liang; Quan Yi Fong	Dasmond Koh; Vivian Lai; Lee Teng; Kate Pang	Dasmond Koh; Vivian Lai; Lee Teng; Pornsak	Huang Wenyong	Romeo Tan
20	20 April 2014	27 April 2014	Caldecott Broadcast Centre; Mediacorp TV Theatre	Suntec City; Suntec Singapore Convention & Exhibition Centre	Chen Shucheng; Samuel Chong; Lucy Chow; Dasmond Koh; Vivian Lai; Lee Teng; Pornsak; Zhang Wei	Guo Liang; Quan Yi Fong	Dasmond Koh; Lee Teng; Pornsak; Youyi	Chen Ning; Dasmond Koh; Lee Teng; Pornsak; Jeffrey Xu; Ben Yeo	All-Time Favourite Artiste	Priscelia Chan
20	20 April 2014	27 April 2014	Caldecott Broadcast Centre; Mediacorp TV Theatre	Suntec City; Suntec Singapore Convention & Exhibition Centre	Chen Shucheng; Samuel Chong; Lucy Chow; Dasmond Koh; Vivian Lai; Lee Teng; Pornsak; Zhang Wei	Guo Liang; Quan Yi Fong	Dasmond Koh; Lee Teng; Pornsak; Youyi	Chen Ning; Dasmond Koh; Lee Teng; Pornsak; Jeffrey Xu; Ben Yeo	Chen Hanwei; Bryan Wong	Priscelia Chan
21	19 April 2015	26 April 2015	Caldecott Broadcast Centre; Mediacorp TV Theatre	Caldecott Broadcast Centre; Mediacorp TV Theatre	Dennis Chew; Dasmond Koh; Lee Teng; Kate Pang	Guo Liang; Quan Yi Fong	Dasmond Koh; Lee Teng; Kate Pang		Jeanette Aw; Vivian Lai	Shaun Chen
22	17 April 2016	24 April 2016	Mediacorp Campus; MES Theatre @ Mediacorp		Dennis Chew; Lee Teng; Pornsak		Show 1	Show 2	Qi Yuwu; Rui En	Julie Tan
22	17 April 2016	24 April 2016	Mediacorp Campus; MES Theatre @ Mediacorp		Dennis Chew; Lee Teng; Pornsak		Dennis Chew; Lee Teng; Pornsak		Qi Yuwu; Rui En	Julie Tan
23	Main Show						Walk-Of-Fame	Post-Show Party	Elvin Ng; Joanne Peh; Quan Yi Fong	—N/a
23	16 April 2017		Mediacorp Campus; MES Theatre @ Mediacorp		Lee Teng		Glenn Goh; Kate Pang; Pornsak; Youyi	—N/a	Elvin Ng; Joanne Peh; Quan Yi Fong	—N/a
24	22 April 2018		Mediacorp Campus; MES Theatre @ Mediacorp		Guo Liang; Quan Yi Fong		Lin Lingzhi; Kimberly Wang; Kenneth Chung	Vivian Lai; Lee Teng	Special Achievement Award	—N/a
24	22 April 2018		Mediacorp Campus; MES Theatre @ Mediacorp		Guo Liang; Quan Yi Fong		Lin Lingzhi; Kimberly Wang; Kenneth Chung	Vivian Lai; Lee Teng	Marcus Chin	—N/a
25	14 April 2019		Mediacorp Campus; MES Theatre @ Mediacorp		Quan Yi Fong		Lee Teng; Gao Mei Gui; Hazelle Teo	Kenneth Chung; Henry Law	Chew Chor Meng	—N/a
25	14 April 2019		Mediacorp Campus; MES Theatre @ Mediacorp		Quan Yi Fong		Lee Teng; Gao Mei Gui; Hazelle Teo	Kenneth Chung; Henry Law	All-Time Favourite Artiste	—N/a
25	14 April 2019		Mediacorp Campus; MES Theatre @ Mediacorp		Quan Yi Fong		Lee Teng; Gao Mei Gui; Hazelle Teo	Kenneth Chung; Henry Law	Kym Ng	—N/a
26	18 April 2021		Jewel Changi Airport; Changi Terminal 4		Guo Liang; Quan Yi Fong		Lee Teng; Desmond Ng; Vivian Lai	—N/a	Dasmond Koh	—N/a
27	24 April 2022		Mediacorp Campus; MES Theatre @ Mediacorp		Chen Hanwei		Lee Teng; Jeremy Chan; Hazelle Teo	—N/a	Dennis Chew; Zheng Geping	—N/a
28	9 April 2023		Marina Bay Sands; Sands Theatre		Lee Teng; Matilda Tao		Dennis Chew; Hazelle Teo	—N/a	Rebecca Lim; Felicia Chin	—N/a
29	21 April 2024		Mediacorp Campus; MES Theatre @ Mediacorp		Dennis Chew; Guo Liang		Herman Keh; Hazelle Teo; Jeff Goh	—N/a	Ann Kok; Jesseca Liu	—N/a
29	21 April 2024		Mediacorp Campus; MES Theatre @ Mediacorp		Dennis Chew; Guo Liang		Herman Keh; Hazelle Teo; Jeff Goh	—N/a	Special Achievement Award	—N/a
29	21 April 2024		Mediacorp Campus; MES Theatre @ Mediacorp		Dennis Chew; Guo Liang		Herman Keh; Hazelle Teo; Jeff Goh	—N/a	Mark Lee	—N/a
30	6 July 2025		Mediacorp Campus; MES Theatre @ Mediacorp		Guo Liang; Chantalle Ng		Dennis Chew; Herman Keh; Hazelle Teo; Denise Camillia Tan	Jeff Goh; Dennis Chew; Herman Keh; Chen Ning; Gao Meigui		—N/a
30	6 July 2025		Mediacorp Campus; MES Theatre @ Mediacorp		Guo Liang; Chantalle Ng		Dennis Chew; Herman Keh; Hazelle Teo; Denise Camillia Tan	Jeff Goh; Dennis Chew; Herman Keh; Chen Ning; Gao Meigui	Christopher Lee	—N/a
30	6 July 2025		Mediacorp Campus; MES Theatre @ Mediacorp		Guo Liang; Chantalle Ng		Dennis Chew; Herman Keh; Hazelle Teo; Denise Camillia Tan	Jeff Goh; Dennis Chew; Herman Keh; Chen Ning; Gao Meigui	All-Time Favourite Artiste	—N/a
30	6 July 2025		Mediacorp Campus; MES Theatre @ Mediacorp		Guo Liang; Chantalle Ng		Dennis Chew; Herman Keh; Hazelle Teo; Denise Camillia Tan	Jeff Goh; Dennis Chew; Herman Keh; Chen Ning; Gao Meigui	Yvonne Lim; Pornsak	—N/a
31	19 April 2026		Mediacorp Campus; MES Theatre @ Mediacorp		Guo Liang; Zhang Ze Tong; Cheryl Chou		Jeremy Chan; Lee Teng; Hazelle Teo; Germaine Tan	—N/a	Carrie Wong; Romeo Tan	—N/a

=== Multiple ceremonies hosted ===
The following individuals have hosted the Star Awards ceremony.

Multiple hosts (Show 2 & Main Ceremony)

- 17: Guo Liang
- 10: Quan Yi Fong
- 8: Timothy Chao
- 6: Yvette Tsui
- 3: Lee Teng
- 2: Matilda Tao, Dennis Chew, Patty Hou, Chun Guek Lay
- 1: Chen Shucheng, Bowie Tsang, Sharon Au, Wendy Xiaoying, Cheng Di, Chen Hanwei, Chantalle Ng, Zhang Ze Tong, Cheryl Chou

Multiple hosts (Show 1) — Discontinued since 2017

- 6: Lee Teng
- 5: Pornsak
- 4: Dasmond Koh, Dennis Chew, Vivian Lai
- 2: Kate Pang, Jeffrey Xu
- 1: Bryan Wong, Michelle Chia, Kym Ng, Michelle Chong, Samuel Chong, Lucy Chow, Zhang Wei, Chen Shucheng

== Telecast ==
The Mediacorp Star Awards, established in 1994, is one of Singapore’s most prestigious television awards, celebrating excellence in the local entertainment industry. Initially held in December, the ceremony was rescheduled to April in 2009 to align with the full calendar-year eligibility period and to accommodate the overwhelming success of The Little Nyonya (2008).

The 2007 ceremony introduced the first-ever double ceremony, with one segment paying tribute to the 25th Anniversary of Singapore television, followed by the regular awards presentation. In 2010, the awards format changed significantly, splitting the event into two separate televised ceremonies, with "Show 1" recognizing technical and production achievements, and "Show 2" featuring major performance categories and live entertainment. This format continued until 2015, with both events airing a week apart.

In 2016, the technical awards were moved to an off-site non-televised presentation, while the main ceremony was split into two distinct shows, focusing separately on variety/info-ed categories and drama categories. For the first time, the Top 10 Artistes awards were divided between Show 1 (Female Artistes) and Show 2 (Male Artistes).

By 2017, the awards reverted to a single-show format, eliminating the post-show party. In 2018, the traditional three-episode prelude was also discontinued.

Following the 2005 merger between Mediacorp and SPH MediaWorks, the awards expanded to include nominees from Channel U. Online live streaming was introduced via xinmsn (2010–2014) and Toggle (2013–2019), though initially restricted to Singapore-based audiences. From 2019 onwards, the Star Awards were made globally accessible via YouTube, broadening its international reach.

== Categories ==
=== Programme awards ===
- Best Drama Serial
- Best Entertainment Programme
- Best Infotainment Programme
- Best Short-form Drama Serial
- Best Short-form Variety Programme
- Best Radio Programme

=== Individual awards ===
- Best Actor
- Best Actress
- Best Supporting Actor
- Best Supporting Actress
- Best Theme Song
- Best Programme Host
- Best Audio Personality

=== Special awards ===
- Special Achievement Award
- All-Time Favourite Artiste

=== Popularity awards ===
- Best Rising Star
- Top 10 Most Popular Male Artistes
- Top 10 Most Popular Female Artistes
- Most Hated Villain
- Favourite CP

=== Technical awards ===
As of 2018, only four technical awards were presented during off-site ceremony.

- Best Screenplay
- Best Variety Producer
- Best Director
- Best Variety Research Writer

=== Former awards ===
Special awards

- 40th Anniversary Evergreen Achievement Award (Awarded only in 2003)
- Talented Artiste Award 多才多艺红星奖 (Awarded only in 2004)
- Honorary TV Award (Awarded only in 2013)

Technical awards
Note: All the categories were introduced in 1998 (unless otherwise stated), and these awards were presented outside broadcast except for 2010–2015, where they were presented on one show.

- Best Variety Set Design since 2001
- Best Set Design since 2002
- Best Sound Design since 2002
- Best Cameraman since 2003
- Best Promotional Video since 2004
- Best Programme Opening Titles since 2004
- Best Set Design since 2005
- Best Variety Editing since 2005
- Best Title Design since 2006

Star awards

A number of awards have either been suspended or retired throughout the years, including some that have been replaced by similar award categories in other areas of recognition:

- Best Comedy Performer (awarded in 1998–2005)
- Best Variety Show Host (awarded in 1998–2015; merged with Info-Ed Programme Host)
- Best News/Current Affairs Presenter (awarded in 2000–09; split into Best News Presenter and Best Current Affairs Presenter)
- Best Info-Ed Programme Host (awarded in 2009–15; merged with Variety Show Host)
- Favourite Male Character (awarded in 2007, 2010–16)
- Favourite Female Character (awarded in 2007, 2010–16)
- Favourite Theme Song (awarded in 2007)
- Favourite Drama (awarded in 2007)
- Unforgettable Villain (awarded in 2010)
- Favourite Onscreen Couple (Drama) (awarded in 2007, 2011–16)
- Favourite Onscreen Partner (Variety) (awarded in 2011; replaced with Favourite Host)
- Favourite Host (awarded in 2012–13)
- Most Popular Regional Artiste Award (awarded in 2014–15)
- Social Media Award (awarded in 2014–16)
- Best Sitcom (awarded in 1998–2002)
- Taiwan's Favourite (awarded in 1998–1999)
- Malaysia's Favourite (awarded in 2000–2003)
- Top Rated Drama Serial (awarded in 2000–16 except 2001 and 2005)
- Best Current Affairs Presenter (awarded in 2010–13)
- Best News Presenter (awarded in 2010–13)
- Rocket (awarded in 2010–16)
- Best News Story (awarded in 2001–16)
- Best Current Affairs Story (awarded in 2001–16)
- Favourite Onscreen Partners (Variety) (awarded in 2011)
- Perfect Combo (awarded in 2022)
- Most Attention Seeking New-Gen Host (awarded in 2022)
- Best Entertainment Special (awarded in 1998-2023, except 2000 & 2018)
- Favourite Male Show Stealer (awarded in 2010-2016, 2022, 2023)
- Favourite Female Show Stealer (awarded in 2010-2016, 2022, 2023)

== Records ==
As of 2026:

=== Overall wins/nominations by a performer, program, etc. ===
Most wins by a drama serial in a single year

- The Dream Makers II (12)

Most nominations by a drama serial in a single year

- The Dream Makers II (26)

Drama series with all five wins in acting categories:

- Holland V and The Dream Makers II

Most Best Actor wins

- Chen Hanwei (7)

Most Best Actress wins

- Huang Biren (5)

Most Best Actor nominations

- Chen Hanwei (16)

Most Best Actress nominations

- Zoe Tay 郑惠玉 (14)

Most Best Supporting Actor wins

- Huang Yiliang (3)

Most Best Supporting Actress wins

- Xiang Yun (5)

Most Best Supporting Actor nominations

- Chen Shucheng (10)

Most Best Supporting Actress nominations

- Xiang Yun (11)

Most Young Talent wins

- Regene Lim 林咏谊 (3)

Singers with Most Theme Song/Original Song wins

- Kelvin Tan (4)
- Kit Chan (4)

Singers with Most Theme Song/Original Song nominations

- Fann Wong (6)

Youngest artiste to be conferred with the All-Time Favourite Artiste Award

- Carrie Wong (age 32)

Oldest artiste to be conferred with the All-Time Favourite Artiste Award

- Zheng Geping (age 57)

All-Time Favourite Artistes with ten consecutive Top 10 Most Popular Artistes awards

- Zoe Tay
- Li Nanxing
- Chew Chor Meng
- Xie Shaoguang
- Fann Wong
- Xiang Yun
- Rui En
- Elvin Ng
- Rebecca Lim
- Carrie Wong

Most wins by a variety/info-ed programme in a single year

- Love On A Plate 名厨出走记 (4)

Most nominations by variety/info-ed programme in a single year

- Black Rose (7)

Most wins for a Variety Programme

- City Beat 城人杂志 (2)
- The Joy Truck 快乐速递 (2)
- Say It If You Dare 有话好好说 (2)
- GeTai Challenge (2)

Most nominations for a Variety Programme

- City Beat 城人杂志 (6)

Most wins for an Info-ed Programme

- Tuesday Report 星期二特写 (5)

Most nominations for an Info-ed Programme

- Tuesday Report 星期二特写 (22)

Most wins for a Variety Special

- Star Awards (9)

Most nominations for a Variety Special

- Star Awards (22)

Most Variety Show Host nominations (programme hosts inclusive)

- Mark Lee (9)
- Kym Ng (9)

Most Variety Show Host wins (programme hosts exclusive)

- Sharon Au (4)
- Mark Lee (4)
- Kym Ng (4)

Most Variety Show Host wins (programme hosts inclusive)

- Quan Yi Fong (8)

Most Info-Ed Programme Host nominations

- Guo Liang (5)
- Bryan Wong (5)

Most Info-Ed Programme Host wins

- Belinda Lee (2)

== Awards and nominations ==
Star Awards had been nominated for 16 times since the Best Variety Special category was introduced in 1998 (with the exceptions for five shows, the award was not presented in years 2000 and 2018; while the ceremony were not nominated in years 1999, 2001 and 2006). As of 2021, eight shows, out of the total 22 ceremonies since 1997 were won, with their first win in 2007 which was awarded for the 2006's ceremony.

Summary of Star Awards and nominations 12 wins out of 33 nominations
Year	Show	Category	Nominee	Representation	Result
1998	Main	Best Variety Special 最佳综艺特备节目	—N/a	Star Awards 1997	Nominated
2002	Main	Best Variety Special 最佳综艺特备节目	—N/a	Star Awards 2001	Nominated
2003	Main	Best Variety Special 最佳综艺特备节目	—N/a	Star Awards 2002	Nominated
2004	Main	Best Variety Special 最佳综艺特备节目	—N/a	Star Awards 2003	Nominated
2005	Main	Best Variety Special 最佳综艺特备节目	—N/a	Star Awards 2004	Nominated
2007	Main	Best Variety Special 最佳综艺特备节目	—N/a	Star Awards 2006	Won
2009	Main	Best Variety Special 最佳综艺特备节目	—N/a	Star Awards 2007	Nominated
2010	Show 1	Best Set Design 最佳综艺布景设计奖	Mohd B Abdul Rahim	Star Awards 2009	Nominated
2010	Show 2	Best Variety Special 最佳综艺特备节目	—N/a	Star Awards 2009	Nominated
2011	Show 1	Best Variety Research Writer 最佳综艺资料撰稿	Glen Lim 林祥平	Star Awards 2010	Nominated
2011	Show 2	Best Variety Special 最佳综艺特备节目	—N/a	Star Awards 2010 (Show 1)	Won
2012	Show 2	Best Variety Special 最佳综艺特备节目	—N/a	Star Awards 2011 (Show 1)	Won
2012	Show 2	Best Variety Special 最佳综艺特备节目	—N/a	Star Awards 2011 (Show 2)	Nominated
2013	Show 1	Best Variety Research Writer 最佳综艺资料撰稿	Lam Yen Fong 蓝燕芳	Star Awards 2012 (Show 1)	Won
2013	Show 2	Best Variety Special 最佳综艺特备节目	—N/a	Star Awards 2012 (Show 1)	Won
2013	Show 2	Best Variety Special 最佳综艺特备节目	—N/a	Star Awards 2012 (Show 2)	Nominated
2014	Show 1	Best Variety Producer 最佳综艺编导	Lim Shiong Chiang 林雄强	Star Awards 2013	Won
2014	Show 1	Best Set Design 最佳综艺布景设计奖	Ahyak Yahya	Star Awards 2013 (Show 2)	Won
2014	Show 2	Best Variety Special 最佳综艺特备节目	—N/a	Star Awards 2013 (Show 2)	Won
2015	Show 1	Best Variety Research Writer 最佳综艺资料撰稿	Lin Shih Han 林诗涵	Star Awards 20 (Prelude)	Nominated
2015	Show 1	Best Variety Producer 最佳综艺编导	Gan Bee Khim 颜美琴	Star Awards 20 (Show 2)	Nominated
2015	Show 2	Best Variety Special 最佳综艺特备节目	—N/a	Star Awards 20 (Show 1)	Nominated
2015	Show 2	Best Variety Special 最佳综艺特备节目	—N/a	Star Awards 20 (Show 2)	Won
2016	Backstage	Best Variety Research Writer 最佳综艺资料撰稿	Jean Toh 卓金云	Star Awards 2015 (Show 2)	Nominated
2016	Show 1	Best Variety Special 最佳综艺特备节目	—N/a	Star Awards 2015 (Show 1)	Nominated
2016	Show 1	Best Variety Special 最佳综艺特备节目	—N/a	Star Awards 2015 (Show 2)	Nominated
2017	Main	Best Variety Special 最佳综艺特备节目	—N/a	Star Awards 2016 (Walk-of-Fame)	Nominated
2017	Main	Best Variety Special 最佳综艺特备节目	—N/a	Star Awards 2016 (Show 1)	Nominated
2017	Main	Best Variety Special 最佳综艺特备节目	—N/a	Star Awards 2016 (Show 2)	Won
2018	Backstage	Best Variety Producer 最佳综艺编导	Gan Bee Khim 颜美琴	Star Awards 2017	Won
2019	Backstage	Best Variety Producer 最佳综艺编导	Khow Hwai Teng 邱慧婷	Star Awards 2018	Won
2019	Main	Best Variety Special 最佳综艺特备节目	—N/a	Star Awards 2018	Nominated
2021	Main	Best Variety Special 最佳综艺特备节目	—N/a	Star Awards 2019	Won
2022	Main	Best Variety Special 最佳综艺特备节目	—N/a	Star Awards 2021 – Awards Ceremony	Won
2023	Industry Achievement Awards	Best Variety Special 最佳综艺特备节目	—N/a	Star Awards 2022 – Awards Ceremony	Won

== See also ==
- List of Asian television awards
- Asian Television Awards- another Television Award Ceremony which recognizes Asian television.
- TVB Anniversary Awards- an Award Ceremony in Hong Kong which was inspired by the Star Awards ceremony and was first held on 19 November 1997.
- Primetime Emmy Awards- another Television Award Ceremony from United States.

== Notes ==
^1The last 2 awards at Star Awards 2022 were the Best Actor and Best Actress Awards instead of the Top 10 Awards.
^2Previously, technical category awards (e.g. Best Director, Best Screenplay, Best Variety Show Producer, etc.), newscaster and current affairs awards and, for a time, the Young Talent Award (for child actors) were held separately at a gala dinner (or afternoon conference) due to time constraints and results and clips from the event would be shown either during the ceremony, or live-streaming before the ceremony. Between 2010 and 2015, and again in 2017, those technical awards were presented in Show 1 (or during the three prelude episodes, in 2017), while the Show 2 presented the main awards. Since 2016 (with the exception for 2017), the format was reverted with the technical category awards presented at an off-site ceremony.
^3In accordance to the social distancing measures, the ceremony is conducted closed-doors, and international celebrities communicate via teleconference due to travel restrictions.
