= My Friends from Afar =

Singaporean TV series

- Also known as: MFFA
- 知星人
- Genre: Alien; Romance; Comedy
- Written by: Cheong Yan Peng 张彦平; Lim Gin Lan 林锦兰
- Directed by: 苏妙芳 Su Miao Fang 马家骏 Ma Jia Jun 张愿庭 Cheong Yuan Teng
- Starring: Shaun Chen; Carrie Wong; Aloysius Pang; Paige Chua
- Opening theme: 平空地带 by The Apex Project
- Ending theme: The Moment (那一刻) by Jean Goh & Cheeyang Ng
- Country of origin: Singapore
- Original language: Chinese
- No. of episodes: 25

Production
- Executive producer: Leong Lye Lin 梁来玲
- Running time: approx. 45 minutes (excluding advertisements)

Original release
- Network: Mediacorp Channel 8
- Release: 4 December 2017 – 5 January 2018

Related
- While We Are Young; 118 Reunion; My Alien Girlfriend (2017)

My Friends from Afar (Chinese: 知星人) is a 25 episode Singaporean drama produced and telecast on Mediacorp Channel 8. It stars Shaun Chen, Carrie Wong, Aloysius Pang and Paige Chua as the casts of this series.

== Cast ==
=== AMIKUS Aliens ===
Cast	Role	Description	Episodes Appeared
Sheila Sim 沈琳宸	Alien Queen 外星女皇	Alien Role: Basler (巴斯乐): Queen of AMIKUS Planet; Gave aliens a mission to integrate into human world to secure a place on earth for aliens to live, and find alien traitor TA1-2345; Human Role: Chen Fengjiao, Chen Xianglin and Chen Qingxia's aunty	1, 23 (voice); 24-25
Wang Yuqing 王昱清	Yang Zhongyong 杨忠勇	Alien Role: TA1-2345: Warrior and Traitor of AMIKUS Planet; Visited earth in 1983 with Chen Fengjiao and other aliens and steals Chen Fengjiao's kapi device; Human Role: Leonardo, Lazy Yong, Skunk Yong (懒皮勇): Huang Lirong's husband; Yang Tiansheng's father; Yang Tianning's adoptive father; Chen Xianglin's adoptive father-in-law; Chen Yibei's grandfather	1-10, 12-25
Brandon Wong 黄炯耀	Chen Xiaolong 陈小龙	Alien Role: TN8-5252, Tan Siao Loong: Nanny of AMIKUS Planet; Actual Age: 60 years old; Human Role: Uncle Long (龙叔): Chen Fengjiao, Chen Xianglin and Chen Qingxia's father; Yang Tianning's father-in-law; Chen Yibei's grandfather; (Deceased - Episode 23)	1-10, 12-23
Brandon Wong 黄炯耀	Chen Xiaolong 陈小龙	Alien Role: TN8-5252, Tan Siao Loong: Nanny of AMIKUS Planet; Actual Age: 60 years old; Human Role: Uncle Long (龙叔): Chen Fengjiao, Chen Xianglin and Chen Qingxia's father; Yang Tianning's father-in-law; Chen Yibei's grandfather; (Deceased - Episode 23)	10 (Toggle Original Series - My Alien Girlfriend)
Carrie Wong 黄思恬	Chen Fengjiao 陈凤娇	Alien Role: RSY9-3870, Tan Fong Keow: Leader of AMIKUS Planet; Actual Age: 55 years old; Visited earth in 1983 with Yang Zhongyong and other aliens; Human Role: Long Legs (长脚怪), Ah Jiao (阿娇): Chen Xiaolong's oldest daughter; Chen Xianglin's younger sister, Chen Qingxia's older sister; Yang Tianning's sister-in-law; Chen Yibei's aunty; In love with Yang Tiansheng	1-25
Carrie Wong 黄思恬	Chen Fengjiao 陈凤娇	Alien Role: RSY9-3870, Tan Fong Keow: Leader of AMIKUS Planet; Actual Age: 55 years old; Visited earth in 1983 with Yang Zhongyong and other aliens; Human Role: Long Legs (长脚怪), Ah Jiao (阿娇): Chen Xiaolong's oldest daughter; Chen Xianglin's younger sister, Chen Qingxia's older sister; Yang Tianning's sister-in-law; Chen Yibei's aunty; In love with Yang Tiansheng	1-2, 10 (Toggle Original Series - My Alien Girlfriend)
Aloysius Pang 冯伟衷	Chen Xianglin 陈祥林	Alien Role: TP5-1487, Tan Xiang Lin: Servant of AMIKUS Planet; Actual Age: 55 years old; Human Role: Chen Xiaolong's son; Chen Fengjiao's and Chen Qingxia's older brother; Yang Tianning's husband; Chen Yibei's father; Yang Zhongyong and Huang Lirong's son-in-law; Yang Tiansheng's brother-in-law; Became pregnant after being kissed by Tianning when she was drunk	1-25
Aloysius Pang 冯伟衷	Chen Xianglin 陈祥林	Alien Role: TP5-1487, Tan Xiang Lin: Servant of AMIKUS Planet; Actual Age: 55 years old; Human Role: Chen Xiaolong's son; Chen Fengjiao's and Chen Qingxia's older brother; Yang Tianning's husband; Chen Yibei's father; Yang Zhongyong and Huang Lirong's son-in-law; Yang Tiansheng's brother-in-law; Became pregnant after being kissed by Tianning when she was drunk	1-2, 10 (Toggle Original Series - My Alien Girlfriend)
Toh Xin Hui 杜芯慧	Chen Qingxia 陈青霞	Alien Role: Your Highness (公主), Tan Ching Sia: Future Queen of AMIKUS Planet; Actual Age: 10 years old; Human Role: Green Prawn (青虾): Chen Xiaolong's youngest daughter; Chen Fengjiao and Chen Xianglin's younger sister; Yang Tianning's sister-in-law; Chen Yibei's aunty; Zhou Guanjun's ex-classmate	1-4, 6-20, 22-25
Toh Xin Hui 杜芯慧	Chen Qingxia 陈青霞	Alien Role: Your Highness (公主), Tan Ching Sia: Future Queen of AMIKUS Planet; Actual Age: 10 years old; Human Role: Green Prawn (青虾): Chen Xiaolong's youngest daughter; Chen Fengjiao and Chen Xianglin's younger sister; Yang Tianning's sister-in-law; Chen Yibei's aunty; Zhou Guanjun's ex-classmate	10 (Toggle Original Series - My Alien Girlfriend)
Shaun Chen 陈泓宇	Yang Tiansheng 杨天生	Younger Version portrayed by Lin Daorui (林道锐) Alien Role: SR1-2345: Defected Child of AMIKUS Planet; Actual age: 5 and 36 years old; Human Role: Durian King (榴莲王), Leopard King (猎豹王): Yang Zhongyong and Huang Lirong’s son; Yang Tianning's half-biological younger brother; Chen Fengjiao's boyfriend; Chen Xianglin's brother-in-law; Zhou Zhiqiang's best friend; Liang Simin's ex-boyfriend; Liu Lianmei's love interest; (Half alien, Half human)	1-25
Shaun Chen 陈泓宇	Yang Tiansheng 杨天生	Younger Version portrayed by Lin Daorui (林道锐) Alien Role: SR1-2345: Defected Child of AMIKUS Planet; Actual age: 5 and 36 years old; Human Role: Durian King (榴莲王), Leopard King (猎豹王): Yang Zhongyong and Huang Lirong’s son; Yang Tianning's half-biological younger brother; Chen Fengjiao's boyfriend; Chen Xianglin's brother-in-law; Zhou Zhiqiang's best friend; Liang Simin's ex-boyfriend; Liu Lianmei's love interest; (Half alien, Half human)	5 (Toggle Original Series - My Alien Girlfriend)
Zemily Leaw 廖婕汝	Chen Yibei 陈依贝	Alien Role: VH9-6868: Child of AMIKUS Planet; Human Role: Chen Xianglin and Yang Tianning's daughter; Yang Zhongyong, Huang Lirong and Chen Xiaolong's grand-daughter; Yang Tiansheng, Chen Fengjiao and Chen Qingxia's niece; (Half alien, Half human)	24-25
Naomi Yeo 杨慧诗	Emily	Alien Role: SA6-78910: Citizen of AMIKUS Planet; Actual Age: 55 years old; Human Role:': Dean's girlfriend; Thomas's ex-girlfriend; Owner of a well known coffee shop	1-10 (Toggle Original Series - My Alien Girlfriend)
Uncredited		Alien Role: TD5-62710: Senior Disciple of AMIKUS Planet (seen)	1
Uncredited		Alien Role: AD3-1468: Junior Disciple of AMIKUS Planet (seen)	1
Uncredited		Alien Role: PR2-5347: Pilot of AMIKUS Planet (mentioned)	1

=== Human Beings ===
==== Yang (Zhongyong) family ====
Cast	Role	Description	Episodes Appeared
Wang Yuqing 王昱清	Yang Zhongyong 杨忠勇	See AMIKUS Aliens	
Adele Wong 王筱惠	Huang Lirong 黄丽蓉	Yang Zhongyong's wife; Yang Tianning and Yang Tiansheng's mother; (Deceased after being unable accept Yang Zhongyong to be an alien and involved in a hit-and-run accident)	5, 24-25
Paige Chua 蔡琦慧	Yang Tianning 杨天宁	Younger version portrayed by Natelie Tan; Complain Queen (抱怨女王): Huang Lirong's daughter; Yang Tiansheng's half-biological older sister; Chen Xianglin's wife; Chen Yibei's mother; Yang Zhongyong's adoptive daughter; Chen Xiaolong's daughter-in-law; Chen Fengjiao and Chen Qingxia's sister-in-law; Zhou Zhiqiang's childhood friend; Li Hengxing's ex-girlfriend	1-25
Shaun Chen 陈泓宇	Yang Tiansheng 杨天生	See AMIKUS Aliens	
Zemily Leaw 廖婕汝	Chen Yibei 陈依贝	See AMIKUS Aliens	

==== Zhang (Huimei) Family ====
Cast	Role	Description	Episodes Appeared
Zhu Xiufeng 朱秀凤	Zhang Huimei 张慧妹	Auntie Huimei (慧妹姨): Zhou Zhiqiang's mother; Xu Xinmei's mother-in-law; Zhou Guanjun's grandmother	1-17, 19-25
Yao Wenlong 姚彣隆	Zhou Zhiqiang 周志强	Supporting Villain but repented Younger version portrayed by Brient Ong (黄盅艺) (Fake), Dogs & Cats Killer (狗猫杀手): Zhang Huimei's son; Xu Xinmei's husband; Zhou Guanjun's father; Yang Tianning's childhood friend; Yang Tiansheng's best friend; Turned evil after being humiliated by Steve and made use of the Chen Family (AMIKUS Aliens) to regain his family reunion; Lured Chen Xiaolong and Chen Qingxia to the gambling dent to Sister Shark; Stole the Kapi and indirectly killed Chen Xiaolong; (Arrested-Episode 24)	2-24
Eelyn Kok 郭蕙雯	Xu Xinmei 许欣梅	Zhou Zhiqiang's wife; Zhou Guanjun's mother; Zhang Huimei's daughter-in-law; Steve's girlfriend/affair/employee	2-4, 6-15, 17, 21-23, 25
Alston Yeo 杨峻毅	Zhou Guanjun 周冠军	Ace Chou Guanjun: Zhou Zhiqiang and Xu Xinmei's son; Zhang Huimei's grandson; Chen Qingxia's ex-classmate	2-4, 6-7, 9-15, 17, 20-25

==== Liang (Sanbo)'s family ====
Cast	Role	Description	Episodes Appeared
Tan Tiow Im 陈天祥	Liang Sanbo 梁三伯	Suffered from dementia; Liang Siyuan and Liang Simin's father	15-17
Brendon Kuah 柯迪宏	Liang Siyuan 梁思源	Xiao Yuan (小源): Liang Sanbo's son; Liang Simin's brother	16-17
Mei Xin 美心	Liang Simin 梁思敏	Xiao Min (小敏): Liang Sanbo's daughter; Liang Siyuan's sister; Yang Tiansheng's ex-girlfriend	1, 6, 10-11, 15-17, 22

=== Well Known Cafe ===
Cast	Role	Description	Episodes Appeared
Trevor Tham 谭志杰	Dean	Emily's present boyfriend and second boyfriend; Employee of a well known cafe	1-10 (Toggle Original Series - My Alien Girlfriend)
Louis Hillyard	Thomas	Form first boyfriend to Emily	1-10 (Toggle Original Series - My Alien Girlfriend)

=== National Environment Agency (NEA) ===
Cast	Role	Description	Episodes Appeared
Wallace Ang 洪圣安	Li Hengxing 李恒兴	Villain; Star: National Environment Agency boss; Yang Tianning's ex-boyfriend, ex-online boyfriend and boss; Tricked Yang Tianning that he is an alien and did not told her he has a wife, causing Yang Tianning to be his mistress; Taking revenge on Yang Tianning by posting "nude photos" of her	1, 6-7, 10-14, 16-18; 5 (voice)
Paige Chua 蔡琦慧	Yang Tianning 杨天宁	National Environment Agency ex-neighbourhood manager; Li Hengxing's employee; Fu Yayue's ex-colleague; See Yang (Zhongyong) family	1-25
Sherraine Law 罗翊琦	Fu Yayue 傅雅月	Moon (月亮): National Environment Agency accountant manager; In love with Chen Xianglin; Yang Tianning's colleague	1, 6-8
Aloysius Pang 冯伟衷	Chen Xianglin 陈祥林	National Environment Agency ex-employee; Was fired by Li Hengxing after defending Yang Tianning; See AMIKUS Aliens	1-25
Carrie Wong 黄思恬	Chen Fengjiao 陈凤娇	National Environment Agency ex-employee; Was fired by Li Hengxing after defending Yang Tianning; See AMIKUS Aliens	1-25

==== Other Casts ====
Cast	Role	Description	Episodes Appeared
Xixi Lim 林茜茜	Liu Lianmei 刘莲梅	Durian Girl (榴莲妹): In love with Yang Tiansheng	1, 3-4, 6-8
Larry Low 刘龙伟	Brother Shark 鲨鱼哥	Villain: Loanshark and Prostitute Agency's boss; Drugged Chen Fengjiao and threw Yang Tiansheng into the sea; (Arrested-Episode 12)	1-4, 10-12
Joyce Ng 黄婉婷	Zhao Yan 赵燕		3, 10-11
Le Yao 乐摇	Sister Shark 鲨鱼姐	Main Villain: Loanshark and Prostitute agency's lady-boss; Vandalised Yang Tiansheng's delivery truck; Made use of Zhou Zhiqiang to lure Chen Xiaolong and Chen Qingxia to the gambling den and killed Chen Xiaolong.; (Arrested-Episode 24)	4, 13, 21-24
Teddy 唐崧瑞	Dave Chu	Younger version portrayed by Kaidon Lee (李景延): In love with Chen Fengjiao; Ms Wong's piano student	8-9, 11, 15-18
William Lawandi 劉峻宏	Steve	Villain: Xu Xinmei's affair; Humiliated Zhou Zhiqiang and abused Zhou Guanjun	8-9, 12, 14-15, 17-21,
Carrie Wong 黄思恬	Ms Wong 黄老师	Dave Chu’ piano teacher; Resembles looks to Chen Fengjiao; (Deceased - mentioned by Dave Chu)	18

== Original Sound Track (OST) ==
No.	Song title	Singer(s)
1)	平空地带 (Main Song for the series)	The Apex Project
2)	那一刻	Jean Goh 吴思佳; Cheeyang Ng 黄智阳

== Reception ==
Lianhe Zaobao, in a review of the show, said that, while some episodes in the middle of the series were not bad, and the premise of aliens integrating into human society was interesting, the last ten episodes suffered somewhat from focusing too much on love affairs of the young people, causing the plot to become predictable and drawn-out. The review also suggested that the alien aspect of the show was a gimmick because the script would have been equally valid had the aliens been replaced with recent immigrants, questioning whether it might have been an improvement to include more memories or details from the aliens' home world and society.

== Awards and nominations ==
=== Star Awards 2018 ===
My Friends From Afar is up for six nominations and has the second most nominations for Star Awards 2018.

The other dramas are nominated for Best Drama Serial with Mightiest Mother In Law, When Duty Calls, While We Are Young and Have A Little Faith.

It did not win a single award.

The Star Awards are presented by Mediacorp.

Star Awards – Performance Awards
Accolades	Nominees	Category	Result
Star Awards	Cheong Yan Peng & Lim Gin Lan	Best Screenplay	Nominated
Star Awards	Young Talent Award	Toh Xin Hui	Nominated
Star Awards	Best Supporting Actor	Brandon Wong	Nominated
Star Awards	Best Actor	Shaun Chen	Nominated
Star Awards	Best Actress	Carrie Wong	Nominated
Star Awards	Best Drama Serial	—N/a	Nominated

== See also ==
- List of MediaCorp Channel 8 Chinese drama series (2010s)
