= Star Awards 2018 =

Star Awards 2018 红星大奖2018
- Sponsored by: Poh Heng Jewellery; MES Group (co-sponsors); Simmons; Motorway Group (Official Car partner); Chan Brothers; LG Electronics; Vintage Studio; KFC Singapore; Dream Cruises; Sony Music (SMEJ)
- Date: Awards Ceremony & Post Party; 22 April 2018
- Location: MES Theatre @ Mediacorp (Awards Ceremony)
- Country: Singapore
- Presented by: Bioskin
- Hosted by: Guo Liang; Quan Yi Fong

Highlights
- Most awards: Drama: When Duty Calls (5); Variety/Info-ed: Ah Ma Can Cook; Little Maestros; Unique Lodging (1 each)
- Most nominations: Drama: When Duty Calls (8); Variety/Info-ed: Fixer; Going Miles, Spreading Smiles (2 each)
- Best Drama: When Duty Calls
- Best Variety Show: Ah Ma Can Cook
- Special Achievement Award: Marcus Chin

Television/radio coverage
- Network: Mediacorp Channel 8 Mediacorp Channel U Toggle
- Runtime: 180 mins (Awards Ceremony); 30 mins (Post Party)

Star Awards 2018 (also SA2018SG, Chinese: 红星大奖2018) is a television award ceremony which is held in Singapore, with the Post Party and Ceremony Awards was broadcast live on 22 April 2018. A total of 15 awards were handed out during the ceremony, among which the Special Achievement Award, an award given out to a celebrity in recognition to meritorious contribution, returned after a 15-year absence, with the award last presented in 2003, in the place of All-Time Favourite Artiste, which was not presented this year, and the third ceremony overall, after 2007 and 2013.

The ceremony saw When Duty Calls winning the most awards, The Lead was the second-biggest winning drama serial, clinching the two other major categories plus Young Talent award, for a total of three. Seven other programs won at least one award during the ceremony.

== Programme details ==
Date	Shows	Time	Channels
22 April 2018	Star Awards 2018– Awards Ceremony	7.00 pm to 10.00 pm	Mediacorp Channel 8 (Singapore); Mediacorp Channel U (Singapore); Astro Xi Yue HD (Malaysia); Toggle
22 April 2018	Star Awards 2018- Post Party	10.30 pm to 11.00 pm	Mediacorp Channel 8 (Singapore); Mediacorp Channel U (Singapore); Toggle
29 April 2018 (Encore Telecast)	Star Awards 2018– Awards Ceremony	3.00 pm to 6.00 pm	Mediacorp Channel 8 (Singapore)
29 April 2018 (Encore Telecast)	Star Awards 2018- Post Party	6.00 pm to 6.30 pm	Mediacorp Channel 8 (Singapore)

== Awards ==
On 5 April 2018, the Creative Achievement Awards was held to recognise the achievements of Mediacorp's creative staff in the past year. It was held in Level 9 of MediaCorp Campus; the guest-of-honour, Tham Loke Kheng, CEO of MediaCorp, gave out the Awards to the recipients.

Winners are listed first, highlighted in boldface.

**Best Variety Research Writer**: **Teo Kim Kee – Going Miles, Spreading Smiles**; Evelyn Gow – Hey Chef! 2; Lam Yen Fong – Unique Lodging; Ng Jin Puay – SPD Charity Show 2017; Seow Zi Xian – Going Miles, Spreading Smiles	**Best Screenplay**: **Seah Choon Guan and Chan Yoke Yeng – Mightiest Mother-in-Law**; Chen Siew Khoon and Chong Mei Yun – Home Truly; Tan Yeow and Seah Choon Guan – When Duty Calls; Lau Ching Poon – Have a Little Faith; Cheong Yan Peng and Lim Gim Lan – My Friends from Afar
**Best Variety Producer**: **Gan Bee Khim – Star Awards 2017**; Alfred Yeo – Thong Chai Charity Show 2017	**Best Director**: **Martin Chan – When Duty Calls**; Loh Woon Woon – While We Are Young; Loo Yin Kam – The Lead; Png Keh Hock – When Duty Calls; Doreen Yap – Dream Coder

The award ceremony was shown live on 22 April 2018.

Winners are listed first, highlighted in boldface.

**Best Drama Serial**: **When Duty Calls**; Have a Little Faith; Mightiest Mother-in-Law; My Friends from Afar; While We Are Young	**Best Theme Song**: **Kenny Khoo & Desmond Ng — When Duty Calls 《以刚克刚》**; The Freshman — Dear DJ 《是爱呀，哈利》; Derrick Hoh — Dream Coder 《为梦想闪耀》; Life Less Ordinary — Life Less Ordinary《小人物向前冲》; Tay Ping Hui — The Lead 《初衷》
**Best Variety Programme**: **Ah Ma Can Cook**; I Love You Mum Challenge - A Gift for Mum; Oh My Heroes!; Take A Break!; The Love 97.2 Breakfast Quartet	**Best Info-Ed Programme**: **Little Masteros**; Fixer; Going Miles, Spreading Smiles; National Flavours; Tuesday Report : #myconnectionsg
**Best Actor**: **Desmond Tan — When Duty Calls as Loke Jun Guang**; Shaun Chen — My Friends from Afar as Yang Tiansheng; Pierre Png — When Duty Calls as Daniel Tan; Romeo Tan — Life Less Ordinary as Chen Yalong; Zhang Zhenhuan — Home Truly as Su Dongbo	**Best Actress**: **Rebecca Lim — The Lead as Lin Meizhen**; Chen Liping — Mightiest Mother-in-Law as Lu Xiuzhu; Paige Chua — Mightiest Mother-in-Law as Guan Shuhui; Carrie Wong — My Friends from Afar as Chen Fengjiao; Zoe Tay — While We Are Young as Fang Ting
**Best Supporting Actor**: **Chen Hanwei — The Lead as Lin Xiaohu**; Chen Shucheng — Home Truly as Hong Shan; Marcus Chin — Have a Little Faith as Qian Zaide; Shane Pow — When Duty Calls as Gordon Yeoh; Brandon Wong — My Friends from Afar as Chen Xiaolong	**Best Supporting Actress**: **Kym Ng — When Duty Calls as Loke Mei Guang**; Bonnie Loo — Mightiest Mother-in-Law as Qi Wanling; Mei Xin — When Duty Calls as Germaine Yeoh; Sheila Sim — 118 II as Hong Shanshan; Aileen Tan — Have a Little Faith as Zhuang Kelian
**Young Talent Award**: **Isabel Yamada — The Lead as Younger Version Of Lin Meizhen**; Violet Raine Ong — Mightiest Mother-in-Law as Qi Zihan; Cruz Tay — Home Truly as Ziheng; Damien Teo — The Lead as Younger Version Of Xie Guanghui; Toh Xin Hui — My Friends from Afar as Chen Qingxia	**Best Programme Host (Variety, Info-Ed & Infotainment)**: **Quan Yi Fong — Unique Lodging**; Felicia Chin — Going Miles, Spreading Smiles; Guo Liang — Voices; Lee Teng — Fixer; Kym Ng — Ah Ma Can Cook
**Best Evergreen Artiste**: **Chen Shucheng**; Marcus Chin; Hong Huifang; Xiang Yun; Zhu Houren	**Best Newcomer**: **Chantalle Ng — While We Are Young as Huang Li Bai Yun**; He Ying Ying — 118 II as Xiao Dingdong; Richie Koh — When Duty Calls as Loke Xian Feng; Hazelle Teo — Dear DJ as Joyce He; Zong Zijie — While We Are Young as Yang Xiaoshuai

=== Special awards ===
**Special Achievement Award^{1}**	**Marcus Chin**

^1The Special Achievement Award is an award presented annually at the Star Awards, a ceremony that was established since 1994. The Special Achievement Award returned after a 14 years hiatus, with the last award being 2003 where it was temporarily discontinued between 2004 and 2017 in place of the All-Time Favourite Artiste award.

=== Top 10 Most Popular Artistes ===
Every year, a poll of 1,000 people representing a wide demographic across Singapore's population, were conducted independently by an accredited market research company, will be used to shortlist the nominations for the Top 20 Male and Female artistes, where they faced the public vote.

This year, 50% of the final results will be derived from this pool of 1,000 people; while the other 50% will comprise telepoll and online voting as a measure of their fan support, to ensure that the representation of results for the Top 10 Most Popular Male and Female artistes were part of the continuous efforts by the Star Awards Committee.

The telepoll lines will be opened from 16 March 2018 and ends on 22 April 2018, 8:30pm.

Key

	Females
	Males
Italic	New to list (not nominated the previous year)
**Bold**	Top 10 winners
n	Recipient's accumulated number of awards
**10**	Recipient won his/her tenth Top 10 award and would be awarded the "All-time Favourite Artiste" on the following year's ceremony.

Stage:	Artistes	**Main Presentation**	
Stage:	Artistes	Top 18	Top 10
**Top 10 Most Popular Female Artistes**
**1900-112-2001**	Wendy Xiao Ying		
**1900-112-2002**	Hayley Woo		
**1900-112-2003**	**Sheila Sim**		1
**1900-112-2004**	**Paige Chua**		4
**1900-112-2005**	Liu Lingling		
**1900-112-2006**	**Carrie Wong**		4
**1900-112-2007**	**Belinda Lee**		5
**1900-112-2008**	Aileen Tan		
**1900-112-2009**	**Pan Lingling**		5
**1900-112-2010**	**Ya Hui**		3
**1900-112-2011**	**Kym Ng**		**10**
**1900-112-2012**	Diana Ser		
**1900-112-2013**	Lin Peifen		
**1900-112-2014**	Joanna Dong		
**1900-112-2015**	**Jin Yinji**		1
**1900-112-2016**	Hong Huifang		
**1900-112-2017**	Bonnie Loo		
**1900-112-2018**	**Rebecca Lim**		7
**1900-112-2019**	Julie Tan		
**1900-112-2020**	**Felicia Chin**		8

Stage:	Artistes	**Main Presentation**	
Stage:	Artistes	Top 18	Top 10
**Top 10 Most Popular Male Artistes**
**1900-112-2021**	Lee Teng		
**1900-112-2022**	Marcus Chin		
**1900-112-2023**	**Pierre Png**		2
**1900-112-2024**	**Shaun Chen**		2
**1900-112-2025**	**Romeo Tan**		4
**1900-112-2026**	**Thomas Ong**		4
**1900-112-2027**	Ha Yu		
**1900-112-2028**	Zhu Houren		
**1900-112-2029**	**Dennis Chew**		8
**1900-112-2030**	**Zheng Geping**		8
**1900-112-2031**	Chen Shu Cheng		
**1900-112-2032**	**Guo Liang**		5
**1900-112-2033**	Andie Chen		
**1900-112-2034**	Jack Neo		
**1900-112-2035**	**Desmond Tan**		3
**1900-112-2036**	**Pornsak**		7
**1900-112-2037**	Aloysius Pang		
**1900-112-2038**	Zhang Zhen Huan		
**1900-112-2039**	Wang Weiliang		
**1900-112-2040**	**Dasmond Koh**		9

== Post show party ==
The post show party aired at 10.30pm, after the broadcast of News Tonight. During the party, guests Joanna Dong and Nathan Hartono teased on an upcoming reality-competition that would promote local Chinese pop culture.

Bioskin Most Charismatic Artiste Award
Bioskin 魅力四射奖
- Elvin Ng 黄俊雄
  - Desmond Tan 陈泂江
  - Jeffrey Xu 徐鸣杰
  - Qi Yuwu 戚玉武
  - Shane Pow 包勋评

== Summary of shows with multiple nominations and wins ==
=== Most nominations ===
Programs that received multiple nominations are listed below, by number of nominations per work:

Dramas that received multiple nominations
Nominations	Drama
8	When Duty Calls 卫国先锋
6	My Friends From Afar 知星人
5	The Lead 第一主角
5	Mightiest Mother-in-Law 最强岳母
4	Have a Little Faith 相信我
4	Home Truly 回家
4	While We Are Young; Z世代
2	118 II
2	Dear DJ 亲爱的九月
2	Dream Coder 梦想程式
2	Life Less Ordinary 小人物向前冲

Dramas that received multiple nominations
Nominations	Variety/Info-ed
2	Ah Ma Can Cook 阿嬷来做饭
2	Fixer 线人
2	Going Miles, Spreading Smiles 一人行，暖人心
1	I Love You Mum Challenge - A Gift For Mum 大声说出我爱你——妈妈的礼物
1	Little Maestros 小当家
1	National Flavours 民族味
1	Oh My Heroes 超人哪里找?
1	Take A Break! 说走就走~短假游
1	The Love97.2 Breakfast Quartet 玉健煌崇 电视版
1	Tuesday Report: #myconnectionsg 星期二特写：情牵新马
1	Unique Lodging 不一样的旅店
1	Voices 听我说

=== Most wins ===
Programs that received multiple wins are listed below, by number of wins per work:

Dramas that received multiple awards
Wins	Drama
5	When Duty Calls 卫国先锋
3	The Lead 第一主角
1	Mightiest Mother-in-Law 最强岳母
1	While We Are Young; Z世代

Programmes that received multiple awards
Wins	Variety/Info-ed
1	Ah Ma Can Cook 阿嬷来做饭
1	Little Maestros 小当家
1	Unique Lodging 不一样的旅店

== Presenters and performers ==
The following individuals presented awards or performed musical numbers.

=== Presenters ===
Name(s)	Role
Lee Rongde 李荣德	Announcer for Star Awards 2018
Top 40 Most Popular Artistes Nominees 十大最受欢迎男女艺人入围者	Cast entrance on stage (in order of appearance): Pierre Png, Rebecca Lim, Shaun Chen; Sheila Sim, Andie Chen, Ya Hui; Lee Teng, Joanna Dong; Guo Liang, Pan Lingling; Chen Shucheng, Jin Yinji; Dasmond Koh, Kym Ng; Hayley Woo, Aloysius Pang, Bonnie Loo; Wang Wei Liang, Belinda Lee; Marcus Chin, Liu Lingling; Zhu Houren, Aileen Tan; Lin Peifen, Dennis Chew, Wendy Xiaoying; Romeo Tan, Felicia Chin, Zhang Zhenhuan; Zheng Geping, Hong Huifang; Carrie Wong, Desmond Tan, Paige Chua
Past year All-Time Favorite Artists recipients 历届超级红星	Gave their opening monologue (in Hologram)
Dennis Chew 周崇庆 Aden Chen 陈煊劼	Presenter for Young Talent Award
Prince Chiu 王子 邱勝翊 Joanne Tseng 曾之喬	Presenter for Best Newcomer Award
Nathan Hartono 向洋	Presenter for Best Theme Song
MediaCorp Group Chairman Niam Chiang Meng 严昌明	Presenter for Best Evergreen Artiste
Christopher Lee 李铭顺 Lin Mei-hsiu 林美秀	Presenter for Best Supporting Actor and Best Supporting Actress
Mickey Huang 黄子佼 LULU (黄路梓茵)	Presenter for Best Programme Hosts, Best Info-Ed Programme and Best Variety Programme
Simon Yam 任达华 Charmaine Sheh 佘诗曼	Presenter for Best Actor and Best Actress
MediaCorp Group CEO Tham Loke Kheng 谭乐琼	Gave out award for Best Drama Series
Senior Minister of State, Ministry of Communications and Information & Health Chee Hong Tat 徐芳达	Gave out award for Special Achievement Award
PwC Singapore associate 林福春	Gave presenters Top 10 Most Popular Artistes winners' list
Guo Liang 郭亮 Quan Yi Fong 权怡凤	Presenter for Top 10 Most Popular Female Artists
Past year All-Time Favorite Artists recipients 历届超级红星	Gave out awards for Top 10 Most Popular Female Artists, in order: Chen Liping 陈莉萍; Zoe Tay 郑惠玉; Huang Biren 黄碧仁; Elvin Ng 黄俊雄; Joanne Peh 白薇秀; Vivian Lai 赖怡伶; Xiang Yun 向云; Bryan Wong 王禄江; Chen Hanwei 陈汉玮; Mark Lee 李国煌
Quan Yi Fong 权怡凤 Simon Yam 任达华	Presenter for Top 10 Most Popular Male Artistes

^2Pornsak was absent on the ceremony; Lee Teng 李腾 represented Pornsak on his behalf.
^3Thomas Ong 王沺裁 was absent on the ceremony; Chen Liping 陈莉萍 represented Ong on her behalf.

=== Performers ===
Name(s)	Performed
Nathan Hartono 向洋	Performer for the Nominations for the Best Theme Song award (in order):《小人物向前冲》,《为梦想闪耀》,《初衷》,《是爱呀，哈利》,《以刚克刚》
Wanting Qu 曲婉婷	Performer of 《我的歌声里》 and "(They Long To Be) Close To You"

== Trivia ==
=== Changes to awards categories ===
- The Best Newcomer returned for the first time after a two-year absence, with the last award presented in 2015.
- This year marked the first show a web series (Dear DJ) had garnered nominations (for Best Newcomer and Best Theme Song).

=== Consecutive nominees and recipients ===
- Chen Hanwei received his second Best Supporting Actor Award.
- Rebecca Lim received her second Best Actress Award.
- Quan Yi Fong won her fifth (and second consecutive) Best Programme Host Award.
- Thomas Ong received Top 10 Most Popular Male Artistes award; Ong was absent during the ceremony while Chen Liping represented him on his behalf.
- Belinda Lee and Pan Lingling received her fifth Top 10 Most Popular Female Artistes award since 2010 and 2000, respectively.
- Kym Ng received her first acting award this year.
- Guo Liang received his fifth Top 10 Most Popular Male Artistes award since 2010.
- All the nominations for the Best Drama Serial were nominated for the first time, ending a five-year streak where at least one nomination received a repeat nomination since the 2012 ceremony.

=== Firsts in top 10 ===
- Jin Yinji and Sheila Sim both received their first Top 10 Most Popular Female Artistes award; for the former, Jin was nominated for eight consecutive years before finally winning her first award; Jin was also the oldest winner to win the award.

=== Absence of awards ===
- This ceremony was the third ceremony since 2004 (after 2007 and 2013) to not present the All-time Favourite Artiste award. The award would return again in 2019 due to Kym Ng winning her tenth Top 10 award.
  - The Special Achievement Award took its place, having returned for the first time since 2003, after 15 years of absence.
- Although the Channel 8 News & Current Affairs had at least ten news presenters by the end of 2018, the Best News Presenter and Best Current Affairs Presenter awards were neither presented for the fifth consecutive year.
- For unknown reasons, the Rocket award, which is given to the most improved Mediacorp artiste, was also not presented for the second consecutive year.
- The Best News Story, Best Current Affairs Story, and Best Variety Special were also not presented this year, all three of which were absent for the first time since 2000.
  - Consequently, the absence for Best Variety Special ended Star Awards's 10-year streak of their nomination for the category, with the last time happened being 2005.

=== Revisions of eligibility criteria ===
To recognise the contributions to local television more broadly, this year's awards will open up nominations to non-Mediacorp artistes. In response, the Star Awards Committee revised the criteria after considering the constructive feedback of industry watchers and audiences. Acting categories were mostly revised, as reflected below:

- Artistes have to play as a lead role in a drama or host in a variety or info-ed program, or as a supporting role/assistant host in at least three eligible programmes or at least 30 episodes out of all eligible programmes, whichever applicable.
- For the Evergreen Artiste Award (an award which recognises contributions by industry veterans), artistes were now evaluated based on the performances for the entire year to promote versatility. Previously, this award is evaluated on a single program only.

== Accolades ==
Organisation	Year	Category	Nominee	Result	Ref
Star Awards	2019	Best Variety Producer	Khow Hwai Teng	Won	
Star Awards	2019	Best Variety Special	—N/a	Nominated	
