= Dream Coder =

- 梦想程式
- Genre: Technology; Romance; Office Politics
- Written by: Tang Yeow 陈耀; Cheong Yan Peng 张彦平
- Directed by: 叶佩娟 Doreen Yap 罗胜 Sam Loh 陈金祥 Martin Chan
- Starring: Romeo Tan; Joanne Peh; Desmond Tan; Carrie Wong; Aloysius Pang; Yao Wenlong
- Opening theme: Shine On (为梦想闪耀) by Derrick Hoh
- Ending theme: 1) Memory Palette (原地打转) by The Freshman; 2) Little World by Ng Ling Kai
- Country of origin: Singapore
- Original language: Chinese
- No. of episodes: 20

Production
- Executive producer: Leong Lye Lin 梁来玲
- Running time: approx. 45 minutes (exc. advertisements)

Original release
- Network: Mediacorp Channel 8
- Release: 7 February – 6 March 2017

Related
- Home Truly; Legal Eagles

Dream Coder (Chinese: 梦想程式) is a Singaporean drama produced and telecast on Mediacorp Channel 8. It stars Romeo Tan, Joanne Peh, Desmond Tan, Carrie Wong, Aloysius Pang and Yao Wenlong as the main casts of the series.

== Cast ==
=== Main cast ===
Cast	Character	Description	Episode Appeared
Romeo Tan 陈罗密欧	Zhong Zhenlong 钟镇隆	Xiao Long (小隆)/Uncle Long (小隆舅舅)/Mama Long (隆妈): Project Director's of Began Apps and special new third founder of Began; Zhong Yayun's younger brother; Ouyang Fan's brother-in-law; Ouyang Keke's uncle; Zheng Hongyi and Yuan Jingcheng's best friend; Feng Ruiqing's ex-boyfriend; In love with Fang Ru; He Jianming's rival in love; Fang Ru's boyfriend in Episode 20	1-20
Joanne Peh 白薇秀	Zhong Yayun 钟雅芸	Mrs Ouyang (欧阳太太): Data Analyst of Began Apps; Zhong Zhenlong's elder sister; Ouyang Fan's ex-wife; Ouyang Keke's mother; Zheng Hongyi and Xu Guangda's love interest; Xu Guangda's girlfriend in Episode 20	1–3, 5–13, 15-20
Desmond Tan 陈泂江	Zheng Hongyi 郑宏毅	Eugan Tay/E.T/Idol (偶像)/Handsome (帅哥): Founder and Film Chief Technology Officer of Began Apps; Zhong Zhenlong and Yuan Jingcheng's best friend; In love with Zhong Yayun; Xu Guangda's rival in love; Li Huixin's idol; Betrayed by Yuan Jingcheng; Huang Minyi's boyfriend in Episode 20	1-20
Carrie Wong 黄思恬	Fang Ru 方如	Sister Fang (方姐): Front-end Developer of Began Apps; Fang Tianren and Mei'e's daughter; Fang Bo's sister; He Jianming and Zhong Zhenlong's love interest; Suffered from Brain Tumors, later recovered; Zhong Zhenlong's girlfriend in Episode 20	1-20
Aloysius Pang 冯伟衷	He Jianming 何建明	Eccentric Turtle (神龟): Front-end Developer of Began Apps; He Xiuxiang's son; In love with Fang Ru; Zhong Zhenlong's rival in love; Li Huixin's love interest; Li Huixin's boyfriend in Episode 20	1-20
Yao Wenlong 姚彣隆	Xu Guangda 徐广达	Leon Chee: Project Manager of Began Apps; Ex-sales representative of Meiya Eyewear; Xu Meimei's Cousin; Xu Jiahui's God-father; In love with Zhong Yayun; Zheng Hongyi's rival in love; Zhong Yayun's boyfriend in Episode 20	1-20

=== Ouyang (Fan) Family ===
Cast	Character	Description	Episode Appeared
Peter Yu 宏荣	Ouyang Fan 欧阳凡	Villain but repented at his deathbed (as mentioned by his mistress); Mr Ouyang (欧阳先生/老板): Zhong Yayun's ex-husband; Ouyang Keke's ex-father; Zhong Zhenlong's brother-in-law; Died in a car accident after chasing a robber in Thailand as mentioned by the Thai police; (Deceased - Episode 13)	1–2, 5
Joanne Peh 白薇秀	Zhong Yayun 钟雅芸	See Main cast	
Natalie Tan 陈宥蒽	Ouyang Keke 欧阳可可	Ouyang Fan and Zhong Yayun's daughter; Zhong Zhenlong's niece; Xu Jiahui's classmate	1–3, 5-20
Romeo Tan 陈罗密欧	Zhong Zhenlong 钟镇隆	See Main cast	

=== Xu (Guangda) Family ===
Cast	Character	Description	Episode Appeared
Yao Wenlong 姚彣隆	Xu Guangda 徐广达	See Main cast	
Shi Huiling 施慧玲	Xu Meimei 徐美美	Handicapped patient; Xu Guangda's Cousin; Xu Jiahui's mother	4–5, 7, 15-16
Donald Chong 张俊豪	Xu Jiahui 徐家辉	Xu Meimei's son; Xu Guangda's god-son; Ouyang Keke's classmate	2, 4–5, 9, 10, 15, 18, 19

=== Fang (Tianren) Family ===
Cast	Character	Description	Episode Appeared
Li Wenhai 李文海	Fang Tianren 方天仁	Prof Fong (方教授): Ex-doctor; Mei'e's husband; Fang Bo and Fang Ru's father	1, 6, 8, 10–11, 18
Lin Qianru 林倩如	Mei E 美鹅	Ex-doctor; Fang Tianren's wife; Fang Bo and Fang Ru's mother	1, 8, 11
Gong Jianli 龔庭立	Fang Bo 方博	Doctor Fong (方医生): Doctor; Fang Tianren and Mei'e's son; Fang Ru's brother	5, 11, 15
Carrie Wong 黄思恬	Fang Ru 方如	See Main cast	

=== He (Xiuxiang) Family ===
Cast	Character	Description	Episode Appeared
Aileen Tan 陈丽贞	He Xiuxiang 何秀香	Silky (Silky 姐): Spa Massager; He Jianming's mother; Kay's girlfriend	4–5, 8, 10–14, 20
Aloysius Pang 冯伟衷	He Jianming 何建明	See Main cast	

=== Li (Junheng) Family ===
Cast	Character	Description	Episode Appeared
Rayson Tan 陈泰铭	Li Junheng 李俊亨	Mr Li (李忠裁): Chief Executive Officer of Tai An Finance Group and Chairman of Chinese Business Association; Li Huixin's father	5, 12, 16, 18-20
Jayley Woo 胡佳琪	Li Huixin 李慧欣	Student Intern of Began Apps; Li Junheng's daughter; He Jianming's girlfriend in Episode 20	2–6, 9–10, 12, 14, 16, 18-20

=== Other cast ===
Cast	Character	Description	Episode Appeared
Teddy 唐崧瑞	Yuan Jingcheng 袁精诚	Main Villain Benjee Yuan, Mr Busy (大忙人): Co-founder and chief executive officer of Began Apps; Zheng Hongyi and Zhong Zhenlong's best friend; Betrayed Zheng Hongyi and Began Apps in Episode 19; Went to Shanghai, China in Episode 20 (as said by Began Apps staffs)	2, 5–6, 8–9, 12–13, 16-20
Seraph Sun 孙欣佩	Feng Ruiqing 冯瑞晴	Zhong Zhenlong's ex-girlfriend; Max's ex-wife	3, 4, 11-14
Nick Teo 张鈞淯	Max	Villain: Feng Ruiqing's ex-husband; Betrayed Feng Ruiqing as he is already married	3-4
Alfred Sim 沈志豪	Kay	Yoga Instructor; He Xiuxiang's boyfriend	4, 12, 14, 20
Jasmine Sim 沈家玉	Yu Chen 羽晨	Li Huixin's best friend	12, 14, 16, 18-19
Kayly Loh 卢传瑾	Huang Minyi 黄敏仪	Regina Wee: Zheng Hongyi's girlfriend in Episode 20	16–17, 20

== Production ==
Info-communications Media Development Authority (IMDA) supported the production of Dream Coder as a way to promote the technology sector, with an emphasis on the Smart Nation initiative.

Production began in September 2016 and filming wrapped up in December 2016.

In order to ensure that the app development process portrayed in the show is realistic, consultation during script writing process and most of the apps seen in the show were designed and developed by an actual local app development firm Originally US.

The series consists of 20 episodes and started its run from 7 February 2017.

== Original Sound Track (OST) ==
No.	Song title	Singer(s)
1)	為夢想閃耀 (Main Song for the series)	Derrick Hoh 何维健
2)	原地打转	The Freshman 插班生
3)	Little World	Ng Ling Kai 黄铃凯

== Awards and nominations ==
Dream Coder was only nominated for 2 awards in the Star Awards 2018.

=== Star Awards 2018 ===
The Star Awards are presented by Mediacorp.

Star Awards – Performance Awards
Accolades	Nominees	Category	Result
Star Awards 2018 Creative Achievement Award Ceremony 专业奖项颁奖礼	Doreen Yap 叶佩娟	Best Director 最佳导演	Nominated

Star Awards – Acting Awards
Nominees	Accolades	Category	Result
Derrick Hoh 何維健	Star Awards 2018 Awards Ceremony 红星大奖2018 颁奖礼	Best Theme Song 最佳主题曲 (《为梦想闪耀》)	Nominated

== International Broadcast ==
Country	Channels	Date	Time	Notes
Malaysia	Astro Shuang Xing	7 February 2017 - 6 March 2017	5.00 PM - 6.00 PM	
Malaysia	Astro Prima & Astro Maya HD	2018	7.00 PM - 8.00 PM	Malay dubbed

== See also ==
- List of MediaCorp Channel 8 Chinese drama series (2010s)
- List of Dream Coder episodes
