= Jasmine Sim =

Singaporean actress (born 1993)

- Born: Jasmine Sim Kar Gek; 22 November 1993 (age 32); Singapore
- Education: Singapore Management University
- Occupations: Actress; model
- Years active: 2014–present

Chinese name
- Traditional Chinese: 沈家玉
- Simplified Chinese: 沈家玉
- Hanyu Pinyin: Shěn Jiāyù

Jasmine Sim (born 22 November 1993) is a Singaporean actress and model.

== Early life ==
Sim was born on 22 November 1993 in Singapore. She attended Victoria Junior College before graduating from the Singapore Management University.

== Career ==
Sim started modelling in 2014 for a local fashion brand, Love, Bonito's store online and was first runner up in New Paper New Face. In 2017, Sim made her acting debut in her first dramas, appearing in Dream Coder, The Lead and When Duty Calls in supporting roles.

Sim starred in a short film titled Down The Rabbit Hole, which was created by the Central Narcotics Bureau (CNB) to remind young people of the hazards of drug abuse.

== Filmography ==
=== Television series ===
| Year | Title | Role | Notes | Ref |
|---|---|---|---|---|
| 2017 | When Duty Calls (卫国先锋) | Shen Yiyun | | |
| 2017 | The Lead | Huang Meina | | |
| 2017 | Dream Coder | Yu Chen | | |
| 2018 | Till We Meet Again (千年来说对不起) | Bai Xue | | |
| 2018 | Divided (分裂) | Lydia Shen | | |
| 2018 | VIC (维多利亚的摸力) | Suki | | |
| 2018 | Doppelganger (入侵者) | Li Jiawen | | |
| 2018−2022 | Kin | Ella Loh / Ella Shelley | | |
| 2019 | After The Stars (攻星计) | Yang Yu | | |
| 2019 | My One In A Million (我的万里挑里一) | Wang Xiangting | | |
| 2019 | If Only (离归) | Hong Yue'er | Directorial debut | |
| 2019 | Walk With Me (谢谢你出现在我的行程里) | Jiang Zhenmei | | |
| 2019 | Limited Edition (我是限量版) | Venessa | | |
| 2020 | Happy Prince (快乐王子) | Ella Loh | Crossover from Kin | |
| 2021 | Control (操控) | Emily | | |
| 2022 | Healing Hands (医生不是神) | Megan | | |
| 2023 | Fix My Life | Luna | | |
| 2023 | All That Glitters | Li Fang | | |

=== Film ===
| Year | English title | Mandarin title | Role | Ref |
|---|---|---|---|---|
| 2023 | Seven Days | 七天 | Lisa | |

== Awards and nominations ==
| Year | Award | Category | Nominated work | Result | Ref |
|---|---|---|---|---|---|
| 2014 | The New Paper New Face | 1st Runner-Up | —N/a | Won | |
| 2019 | Star Awards | Best Newcomer | Doppelganger (as Li Jiawen) | Won | |
| 2021 | Star Awards | Top 10 Most Popular Female Artistes | —N/a | Nominated | |
| 2023 | Star Awards | Top 3 Most Popular Rising Stars | —N/a | Nominated | |
