= Carrie Wong =

Singaporean actress (born 1994)

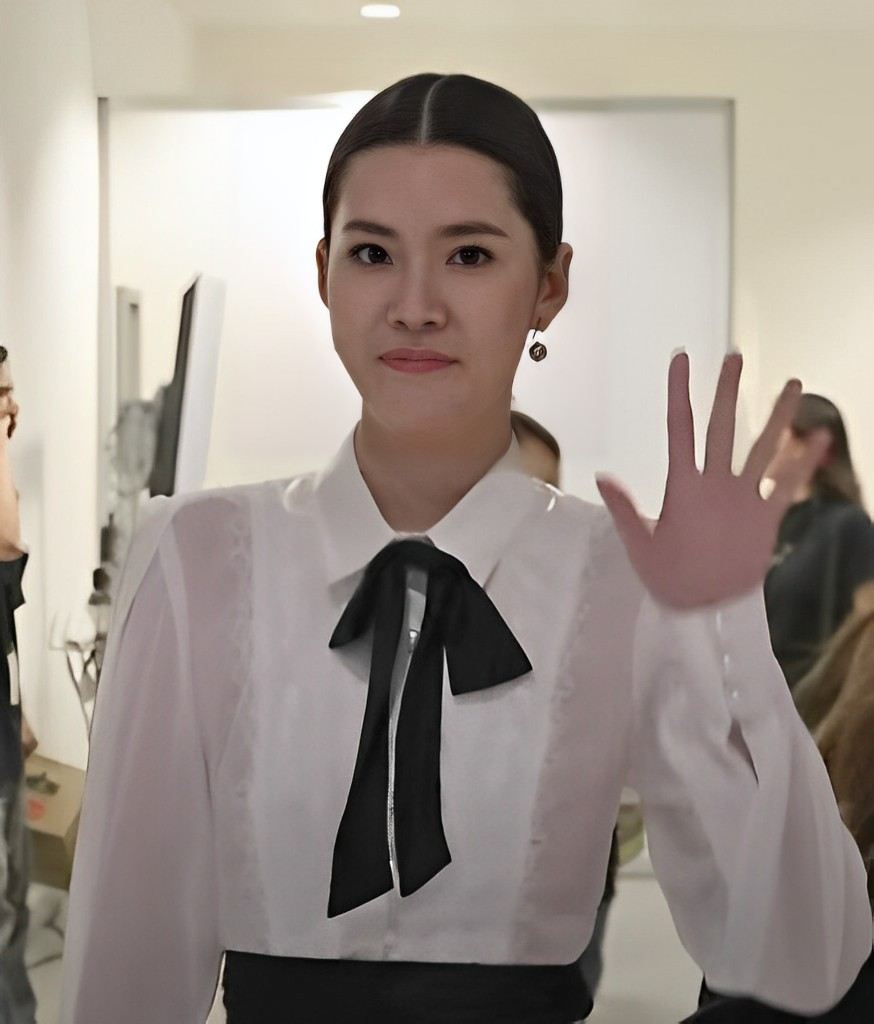
- Wong at the Star Awards 2017
- Born: 1 January 1994 (age 32); Singapore
- Education: Nanyang Polytechnic
- Occupation: Actress
- Years active: 2013–present
- Awards: Full list

Chinese name
- Traditional Chinese: 黃思恬
- Simplified Chinese: 黄思恬
- Hanyu Pinyin: Huáng Sītián
- Yale Romanization: wòhng sī tíhm
- Jyutping: wong4 si1 tim5

Carrie Wong Si Tian (born 1 January 1994) is a Singaporean actress. She was discovered through the reality television competition Hey Gorgeous.

== Early life and education ==
Wong is the only child of a housewife mother and father who works in a security firm. Wong studied hospitality and tourism management at Nanyang Polytechnic.

== Career ==
In 2013, in the second season of Hey Gorgeous, Wong was scouted by the hosts and eventually became one of the two runner-ups, beside Richie Koh, of the show. After the show concluded, Wong finished her education at Nanyang Polytechnic and began her media career. In 2014, Wong debuted in Scrum!.

In 2025, Wong received her 10th Top 10 Most Popular Female Artistes during the 2025 Star Awards. In 2026, Wong received her All-Time Favourite Artiste award for receiving 10 Most Popular Artiste awards.

== Filmography ==
=== Television series ===
Year	Title	Role	Notes	Ref.
2014	Scrum!	Li Siqi		
2014	Against The Tide	Di Yao		
2014	Against The Tide	Scarlet		
2014	The Journey: Tumultuous Times	Bai Lanxiang		
2014	Spouse for House	Sarah Toh	Cameo	
2014	118	Zhang Ke'ai		
2015	Love On Air	Eve		
2015	Sealed With A Kiss	Tian Zhenzhen		
2015	Life - Fear Not	Bai Meigui		
2016	Don't Worry, Be Healthy	Elena		
2016	The Gentlemen	Wang Kaixin		
2016	You Can Be An Angel 2	Jin Siyan		
2016	Hero	Alexa		
2016	118 II	Zhang Ke'ai		
2017	Dream Coder	Fang Ru		
2017	My Friends From Afar	Ms Wong / Chen Fengjiao		
2018	118 Reunion	Zhang Ke'ai		
2018	My Agent Is A Hero	Suzy Ong		
2018	VIC	Vicky Zhan / Victoria Lek		
2018	Love At Cavenagh Bridge	Xu Peizhen		
2018	You Can Be An Angel 3	Jin Siyan		
2019	My Agent Is A Hero II	Suzy Ong		
2019	Hello Miss Driver (下一站，遇见)	Lin Chenxi		
2019	My One In A Million	Yan Shuyu		
2019	A World of Difference	Claire Tan Sixuan		
2020	A Quest to Heal	Luo Mingyi		
2020	Recipe of Life	Zhou Minming		
2021	The Peculiar Pawnbroker	Cheng Yicheng		
2022	Soul Doctor	Hong Jieshan	Cameo	
2022	Sisters Stand Tall	Megan Wong		
2022	Soul Detective	Hong Jieshan		
2023	Shero	Zhang Yinxi		
2024	Love Coded	Lin Siyu		
2026	Kidnap Game	Janice Lau		

=== Variety shows ===
Year	Title	Notes	Ref.
2013	Style: Check In 2 (潮人攻略 2)	Guest host	
2014	Style: Check In 5 (潮人攻略 5)	Guest host	

== Discography ==
=== Compilation albums ===
Year	English title	Mandarin title
2016	MediaCorp Music Lunar New Year Album 16	新传媒群星金猴添喜庆
2017	MediaCorp Music Lunar New Year Album 17	新传媒群星咕鸡咕鸡庆丰年
2018	MediaCorp Music Lunar New Year Album 18	新传媒群星阿狗狗过好年
2019	MediaCorp Music Lunar New Year Album 19	新传媒群星猪饱饱欢乐迎肥年
2022	MediaCorp Music Lunar New Year Album 22	新传媒群星旺虎泰哥迎春乐

=== Soundtrack appearances ===
Year	Drama title	Song title	Other singer(s)	Notes
2015	Life – Fear Not	"一样"	Aloysius Pang	Sub-theme Song
2019	Hello Miss Driver 下一站，遇见	"Life Rose" 生命蔷薇	—N/a	Theme Song
2019	Hello Miss Driver 下一站，遇见	"The Next Stop" 下一站	Deng Biyuan 邓碧源	Sub-theme Song

== Awards and nominations ==
Organisation	Year	Category	Nominated work	Result	Ref.
Seoul Webfest 2022	2022	Best Actress	The Peculiar Pawnbroker	Nominated	
Star Awards	2015	Best Supporting Actress	The Journey: Tumultuous Times	Nominated	
Star Awards	2015	Best Newcomer	—N/a	Nominated	
Star Awards	2015	Top 10 Most Popular Female Artistes	—N/a	Won	
Star Awards	2015	BottomSlim Sexiest Legs Award	—N/a	Nominated	
Star Awards	2016	Best Supporting Actress	118	Nominated	
Star Awards	2016	Top 10 Most Popular Female Artistes	—N/a	Won	
Star Awards	2016	Social Media Award	—N/a	Won	
Star Awards	2017	Top 10 Most Popular Female Artistes	—N/a	Won	
Star Awards	2018	Best Actress	My Friends From Afar	Nominated	
Star Awards	2018	Top 10 Most Popular Female Artistes	—N/a	Won	
Star Awards	2019	Best Actress	VIC	Nominated	
Star Awards	2019	Top 10 Most Popular Female Artistes	—N/a	Won	
Star Awards	2021	Best Actress	A Quest to Heal	Nominated	
Star Awards	2021	Top 10 Most Popular Female Artistes	—N/a	Won	
Star Awards	2022	Top 10 Most Popular Female Artistes	—N/a	Won	
Star Awards	2023	Bioskin Most Charismatic Artiste Award	—N/a	Nominated	
Star Awards	2023	Top 10 Most Popular Female Artistes	—N/a	Won	
Star Awards	2024	Bioskin Most Charismatic Artiste Award	—N/a	Nominated	
Star Awards	2024	Top 10 Most Popular Female Artistes	—N/a	Won	
Star Awards	2025	BYD Favourite Female Character Award	Coded Love	Won	
Star Awards	2025	Top 10 Most Popular Female Artistes	—N/a	Won	
Star Awards	2026	All-Time Favourite Artiste	—N/a	Won	
