= Teddy Tang =

Singaporean actor and model (born 1986)

- Born: 29 October 1986 (age 40); Singapore
- Education: Gan Eng Seng School; Yishun Junior College
- Alma mater: Nanyang Technological University
- Occupations: Actor; host; model
- Years active: 2012−present
- Agents: Starsnest (Singapore); Phoenix Talent (Taiwan)
- Modeling information
- Height: 1.88 m (6 ft 2 in)

Current stage name
- Traditional Chinese: 唐松瑞
- Simplified Chinese: 唐松瑞
- Hanyu Pinyin: Táng Sōngruì

Former stage name
- Traditional Chinese: 唐崧瑞
- Simplified Chinese: 唐崧瑞
- Hanyu Pinyin: Táng Sōngruì

Teddy Tang (born 29 October 1986) is a Singaporean actor, television host and model.

== Early life ==
Teddy Tang won a local TV talent hunt, Hey Gorgeous, in 2009. Within the same year, the then part-time model flew to Hong Kong to pursue a modelling career after graduating with a Mechanical Engineering degree from Nanyang Technological University. He is also an alumnus of Gan Eng Seng School and Yishun Junior College.

== Career ==
He was awarded Best Newcomer in Asia Model Awards 2014. Six months later, he moved to Taiwan because he felt it had a more vibrant entertainment scene, with a larger market for budding actors.

His exotic good looks, inherited from a Taiwanese mother and a Singaporean Chinese father of Dutch and Japanese descent, landed him a spot with Taiwan model agency Catwalk in 2015.

He made his rounds at the Taiwanese variety show circuit, displaying his wit on talk shows Genius Go Go Go (天才冲冲冲) and GTV Delicious (美味搜查线) and showing his athletic ability on gameshow Variety Get Together (综艺大集合).

Teddy's modelling portfolio includes gigs such as Fendi, Issey Miyake, Dior, Timberland Fashion Show & Adidas shows in Singapore, Hong Kong, China and Taiwan. He has also appeared in the commercials and print ads of brands such as Samsung, Hyundai, Gucci and American Express in Singapore, Hong Kong, China and Taiwan. He also featured in editorial shoots for Esquire and GQ Taiwan.

Teddy later returned to Singapore in May 2016 to take on local productions such as Channel 5 series Tanglin and Channel 8 drama Hero. He did hosting too.

Tang moved to Taiwan again in 2019, citing that opportunities there are more varied.

== Filmography ==
=== Television series ===
Year	Title	Role	Notes
2016	Hero	Jack	Cameo
2016	You Can Be an Angel 2	Ken	Cameo
2016	Tanglin	Alex Song	Cameo
2017	My Friends From Afar	Dave Chu	Cameo
2017	Have A Little Faith	James	Cameo
2017	Dream Coder	Yuan Jingcheng	
2018	Jalan Jalan (带你去走走)	Paul Yang	Cameo
2018	Gifted	Zhao Qikang	Malaysian production
2019	My One In A Million (我的万里挑里一)	Herman	
2019	Old Is Gold (老友万岁)		Cameo
2019	Hello Miss Driver (下一站，遇见)	Max	
2020	Mother To Be (未來媽媽)	Mr Zheng	Episode 10
2021	Crouching Tiger Hidden Ghost	Jeffrey Tan	
2022	Healing Heroes (医生不是神)		
2022	Soul Detective		
2023	Fix My Life		
2023	Shero		
2023	Family Ties		
2023	Venus On Mars (火星上的維納斯)		
2023	All That Glitters	Patrick	
2024	Moments (时光倾城)		

=== Film ===
Year	Title	Role	Notes
2019	Handsome Stewardess (帥T空姐)		Telemovie

=== Variety show ===
Year	Title	Role	Notes
August 2016	What's In The Fridge? (冰箱的秘密)	Guest appearance	MediaCorp Channel 8; Cooking Show
November 2016	Closet Secrets (衣橱密语)	Host	MediaCorp Channel 8
January 2017	Let's Go Dating (我们去相亲)	Host	MediaCorp Channel 8; Info-Ed Travelogue
July 2017	Lady First Singapore Season 5 (女人我最大)	Guest appearance 2 episodes	Starhub Hub E City; Taiwanese variety television show; On beauty, fashion and lifestyle
January 2018	Spicy Hot (火辣辣)	Host	Mediacorp Channel 8; Travelogue; Info-Ed

== Awards and nominations ==
Year	Award	Category	Nominated work
2014	Asia Model Awards 2014	Best Newcomer	—N/a
