= Home Truly =

- 回家
- Genre: Family; Lunar New Year; Romance
- Written by: 陈秀群 Chen Siew Khoon 张湄纭 Chong Mei Yun
- Directed by: 方傢福 Png Keh Hock 陈䅧元 Chen Bang Yuan
- Starring: Zhang Zhenhuan; Pierre Png; Hong Ling
- Opening theme: About Time (只怕不够时间看你白头) by Eman Lam
- Ending theme: Remain Faithful onto Death (至死不渝) by Eman Lam
- Country of origin: Singapore
- Original language: Chinese
- No. of episodes: 20

Production
- Executive producer: Chong Liung Man 张龙敏
- Running time: approx. 45 minutes (exc. advertisements)

Original release
- Network: Mediacorp Channel 8
- Release: 10 January – 6 February 2017

Related
- Hero; Dream Coder

Home Truly (Chinese: 回家) is a Singaporean drama produced and telecast on Mediacorp Channel 8.The drama is a Lunar New Year drama for 2017.It stars Zhang Zhenhuan, Pierre Png and Hong Ling as the casts of this series.

== Cast ==
=== Su (Shengquan) family ===
- Li Wenhai as Su Shengquan 苏盛泉, Su Dongbo's father who is the boss of a fishery and the leader of the neighbourhood patrol team
- Zhang Zhenhuan as Su Dongbo 苏东博

=== Peng (Dayu) family ===
- Rayson Tan as Peng Dayu 彭大宇, Ye Peixiang's husband who works as a chef at Café Haven
- Priscelia Chan as Ye Peixiang 叶佩香
- Hong Ling as Zheng Peizhi 郑沛芝, Peng Dayu's cousin

=== Hong (Shan) family ===
Cast	Character	Description	Ref
Chen Shucheng	Hong Shan 洪山	Volcano (大火山): Lonely elderly; Lian-jie's neighbour; Hong Jianfeng's father; Hong Jing'en's foster father; Ziheng's foster grandfather	
Sun Baoling 荪保伶	Lisha 丽莎	Hong Jing'en's mother; Ziheng's grandmother	
Pierre Png	Hong Jianfeng 洪剑锋	Uncle-Daddy (舅舅爹地): Hong Shan's son; Hong Jing'en's brother; Ziheng's uncle; Love triangle with Zheng Peizhi and Su Dongbo; Ex-convict	
Mei Xin	Hong Jing'en 洪静恩	Lisha's daughter; Hong Shan's foster daughter; Hong Jianfeng's sister; Ziheng's mother; Has kleptomania	
Cruz Tay 郑凯泽	Ziheng 子恒	Lisha's grandson; Hong Jing'en's son; Hong Jianfeng's nephew	

=== Bao (Weibin) family ===
Cast	Character	Description	Ref
Cavin Soh	Bao Weibin 包韦斌	Uncle Ice Cream (冰淇淋叔叔): Owner of Café Haven; Bi Qilin's husband	
Adele Wong	Bi Qilin 毕琪霖	Auntie Ice Cream (冰淇淋阿姨): Bao Weibin's wife; Artist	

=== Lian-jie family ===
Cast	Character	Description	Ref
Hong Huifang	Lian-jie 莲姐	Lucas's mother; Volunteer; Hong Shan's neighbour	
Gong Jianli 龔庭立	Lucas	Lian-jie's son; Lawyer	

=== Other characters ===
Cast	Character	Description	Ref
Larry Low 刘龙伟	A-bao 阿豹	Main Villain; Leopard (豹哥): Triad boss	

== Original Sound Track (OST) ==
No.	Song title	Singer(s)
1)	只怕不够时间看你白头 (Main Song for the series)	Eman Lam 林二汶
2)	至死不渝	Eman Lam

== Episodes ==
No.	Title	Original release date
1	"Episode 1"	10 January 2017
It’s Peng Dayu (Rayson Tan) and A-xiang’s (Priscelia Chan) wedding day. As one of the groomsmen, Su Dongbo (Zhang Zhenhuan), is subject to the bridesmaids’ pranks. Dongbo goes to pick Zheng Peizhi (Hong Ling) up from the airport. She has flown in from Thailand to attend the wedding. He happens to lose her luggage accidentally, and she is very annoyed. Dongbo has always wanted to get married. He has a liking for Peizhi. Bao Weibin (Cavin Soh) is the owner of Café Haven. He is overwhelmed in the kitchen as Dayu, who is his chef, is on leave. His wife, Bi Qilin (Adele Wong), is an artist. Even though they have been married many years, they do not have any children as yet. Hong Jianfeng (Pierre Png) has served five years in prison. Upon his release, he is unable to find his sister, Hong Jing’en (Chen Meixin), and her son, Ziheng (Cruz Tay), who have moved. Jing’en has kleptomania. It was she who stole Peizhi’s luggage. She is caught red-handed for stealing earrings in a shop. Dongbo’s father, Su Shengquan (Li Wenhai), is always ready to help others. He is the leader of the neighbourhood patrol team. When Lian-jie (Hong Huifang) complains she is being harassed, he agrees to step up the patrols in the area.
2	"Episode 2"	11 January 2017
Dongbo is upset to learn some fish farms have been affected by the toxic algae bloom known as red tide. A-xiang tells Peizhi her dream of marrying a rich man has been dashed. Her hopes are now on Peizhi, who is stunned that A-xiang wants to matchmake her and Dongbo. Knowing Weibin is desperate to have a child, Dayu gives him medicated wine brewed according to a formula handed down from his ancestors. Unable to get a job, Jianfeng loiters in the streets. He bumps into Ziheng, who does not recognise him. With no place to go, he sleeps in a lorry. Lian-jie figures that the person who has been harassing her is Hong Shan (Chen Shucheng). Peizhi doesn’t want to impose on A-xiang, and chooses to stay at the fish farm. Meanwhile, the lorry Jianfeng is sleeping in arrives at the fish farm. Peizhi cooks fish, but returns to her dish to find that someone else has eaten it up. She wants to find the culprit. Fearful of being found out, Jianfeng remains in hiding and creates the impression that the place is haunted. However, he soon faints in the lorry.
3	"Episode 3"	12 January 2017
A-xiang and Dayu have been married two days. She urges him to go back to work. When he leaves home, she heads out to meet a middle-aged man and enters his flat. Dayu makes a Thai dessert for a Caucasian, who gives him three times his pay. He earns still more money selling fish contaminated by the red tide. Jing’en takes Ziheng to Qilin for drawing lessons. She seizes the opportunity to get a loan from Weibin. Peizhi is surprised when A-xiang shops for designer bags. A-xiang reveals she is making extra income without Dayu’s knowledge. Dayu brings the tainted fish home. He is nervous to find Dongbo in his house and fears being punished for selling the fish. Dongbo and Shengquan get into a heated argument over the contaminated fish. Peizhi mediates.
4	"Episode 4"	13 January 2017
Jianfeng sneaks into the kitchen at the fish farm, looking for food. Peizhi discovers him and ties him up. Jianfeng faints. Peizhi realises the person she has taken for a thief is running a fever. She helps him into her room and tries to bring his fever down. To prevent Dongbo from finding him, she hides him under the blankets. Hong Shan is thrown out of the house by his landlord. He blames Lian-jie and comes up with a reason to go to her house. He is surprised to learn she has two sons who are successful in their careers. Weibin employs Jing’en as a waitress at Café Haven. A-xiang encourages Qilin to adopt a six-year-old Thai boy named Tawyne. Qilin agrees reluctantly. However, Weibin refuses to adopt the child. He only wants a child of his own flesh and blood. Qilin panics when Tawyne goes missing. She and Weibin finally find him in a closet, crying for his mother. Jing’en has arranged to meet some old uncles, intending to sell them a type of creme. A-bao turns up instead and accuses her of stealing his heroin. In a rage, he threatens to chop her hand off.
5	"Episode 5"	16 January 2017
Jianfeng develops food poisoning. Peizhi hides him in the dormitory, where her ruse is almost discovered by Dongbo. She fakes being ill and consults a doctor to get medicine for Jianfeng. Dongbo bumps into Dayu, who is trying to transport the last batch of contaminated fish out of the fish farm. Dayu lies that he is accompanying A-xiang to visit Peizhi. Jianfeng hides before A-xiang enters Peizhi’s room. However, his condition worsens and he soon collapses. Peizhi urges Dayu and A-xiang to take Jianfeng away to avoid being discovered. They rent a room to Jianfeng, since the tenant has moved out. Knowing Jianfeng has just been released from prison, Dayu and A-xiang doubt his character. A-xiang notices women’s accessories among his belongings and develops the idea that he is a pervert. Weibin secretly takes Tawyne back to his mother. Qilin is disappointed. Only later does she find out that Tawyne’s mother’s had requested to have her child back. She firmly believes she and Weibin will have a child of their own some day.
6	"Episode 6"	17 January 2017
While out looking for a job, Jianfeng saves Peizhi from being hit by a football. Her impression of him changes. Jianfeng is shunned by prospective employers. However, one of his former colleagues recommends him for a job as a deliveryman. Jianfeng bumps into an enemy of his named A-bao. The latter thinks highly of him and tries to recruit him to help in an illegal business. Jianfeng declines and is attacked. Peizhi helps A-xiang sell contaminated fish cakes near the MRT station and is nearly caught by the authorities. Jing’en saves her and extorts money from her. She confiscates the fish cakes when Peizhi can’t pay up. Several people develop food poisoning. Shengquan is incensed to learn Dayu had stolen the contaminated fish and sold it. Dayu, A-xiang and Peizhi worry their work permits could be revoked and they could be jailed. Dongbo steps forward and claims responsibility for their deed. Hong Shan stays at Lian-jie’s house. They keep bickering, which annoys Lian-jie. Lian-jie slips and falls but does not tell her sons. She is grateful when Hong Shan manages to get one of them to visit her.
7	"Episode 7"	18 January 2017
Peizhi is shocked by the severity of Jianfeng’s injuries. While tending to his wounds, she notices him staring at the photo of Jing’en and Ziheng. She recalls encountering Jing’en at the MRT station, and Jianfeng decides to wait at the station to see if he might bump into them. Jing’en is caught stealing and runs away. She is ashamed when she stumbles upon Jianfeng. She tells Weibin that she hopes Jianfeng is not her brother. He senses that she has a special affection for Jianfeng. Qilin needs to undergo IVF if she wants to have a baby. Weibin worries about the toll it will take on her, but she insists on going ahead. While making soup for Jianfeng, Peizhi cuts her finger. Dongbo offers to help. He feels uneasy when she mentions a person she admires. Jianfeng’s former employer does not dare to hire him, for fear of offending the gangsters. Recognising Jing’en as the person who had stolen Peizhi’s luggage, Dongbo tails her. Jing’en is unable to control herself. She steals a handphone and is seen by A-bao and Kent. Kent catches Jing’en, only to be hit with a rod by Dongbo.
8	"Episode 8"	19 January 2017
Dongbo asks A-xiang why Peizhi keeps going to the MRT station. A-xiang wonders, too. Dongbo goes to the pub to return the stolen handphone on behalf of Jing’en. He soon realises the other party is A-bao. The latter applauds Dongbo’s guts and drinks with him. To save Jing’en, Dongbo lies that they are a couple. Weibin is against the IVF procedure. Empathising with Qilin’s desire to have a child, however, he gives in. While drunk, Dongbo expresses his love for Peizhi and falls asleep. When he awakes, she takes him out and they have a nice day together. Shengquan has high hopes for their relationship but Peizhi is undecided. Qilin finally gets pregnant. She draws a family portrait and looks forward to the arrival of her baby.
9	"Episode 9"	20 January 2017
Jianfeng finds a job at the hawker centre. A-bao continues to pester him. Jianfeng waits at the MRT station everyday, but does not see Jing’en. Under the mistaken impression that loansharks are after Jianfeng, A-xiang drives him out of the house. It turns out that Dayu is the person who has the loanshark debt. Peizhi’s hometown is ravaged by heavy flooding. Jianfeng gives her his savings to help her through the crisis. Encouraged by his optimism, she regains hope. Peizhi asks Shengquan for a loan. Shengquan will only lend her money if she and Dongbo register their marriage. Peizhi hesitates, as she is not in love with him. A-xiang encounters A-bao, who lusts after her. He makes an indecent proposal, which she refuses. A-bao buys fish from the fish farm and asks for his order to be delivered to a Johor address. He also wants a few boxes of dried scallops to be delivered. Afraid A-bao might be using Dongbo for illegal activity, Jing’en asks Weibin for help. Qilin returns home alone. She unknowingly steps on a pencil and slips.
10	"Episode 10"	23 January 2017
A-xiang is considering working at A-bao’s massage parlour so as to be able to pay off Dayu’s loanshark debts. A-bao gives her a cash cheque which, if encashed, obliges her to work for him. Qilin is woken up by a nightmare. Weibin comforts her and decides against another artificial insemination procedure. He cries when he throws away the baby items. Hong Shan chances upon Jianfeng and they get into a heated argument. He gets drunk, then complains to Lian-jie, who gets the mistaken idea that Dayu is his son. Shengquan gives Peizhi a cheque, to entice her to marry Dongbo. She agrees. Dongbo tears up the cheque and asks if she is still willing to marry him. Dongbo takes Jianfeng to see Jing’en. Instead, Jianfeng gets to see his son, Ziheng, and is elated. Kent beats Dayu up. Out of desperation, A-xiang gives him A-bao’s cheque.
11	"Episode 11"	24 January 2017
Qilin sees the vulnerable side of Weibin when he gets drunk. She realises he has been hiding his pain from her, so as not to aggravate her grief. Unaware Jing’en is avoiding Jianfeng, Ziheng takes him to the café. Jianfeng is disappointed that Jing’en is duping old uncles into buying questionable facial products. He wants her to reform. A-xiang has used A-bao’s $5,000 to pay off Dayu’s debts. She asks to pay A-bao back by installments, but he suggests she accompany him on a casino cruise instead. Lian-jie helps Hong Shan locate Jing’en via social media. Hong Shan tails Jing’en and is mistaken for a pervert. He slips and falls when Ziheng tries to hit him with a baseball bat. Weibin objects to Qilin getting injections to trigger ovulation. He doesn’t want her to go through the pain of conceiving. Jing’en offers to be the surrogate mother.
12	"Episode 12"	25 January 2017
Jing’en promises to bear a healthy baby for Weibin and Qilin. Weibin hesitates. Ziheng has an asthma attack. Hong Shan saves him and takes him home. His concern for Jing’en leads Ziheng to think he is courting her. A-xiang decides to go on the casino cruise with A-bao. He wants her to smuggle heroin for him. Dayu finds out A-xiang has used A-bao’s cheque to pay off his loans. With Dongbo, he rushes to the pub. A-bao demands that he and A-xiang smuggle heroin to KL, and detains Dongbo as his hostage. Dayu and A-xiang hide in the fish farm. Peizhi and Jianfeng get wind of their predicament. Jianfeng wants to take the heroin back and exchange it for Dongbo, but A-xiang claims they have dumped the drug into the sea. Jianfeng heads over to negotiate with A-bao. A scuffle ensues, and he and Dongbo manage to escape. A-bao turns up at the fish farm and starts messing things up. Shengquan promises to pay off Dayu’s debts, but A-bao insists on settling the dispute with Dayu personally.
13	"Episode 13"	26 January 2017
Dayu and A-xiang are terrified; they know A-bao won’t let them off. Jianfeng meets A-bao alone and declares he has a voice recording of their previous exchange. He threatens to file a police report if A-bao refuses to settle the matter amicably. Dayu learns A-xiang is pregnant. He vows to work hard to provide for them. Shengquan is impressed by Jianfeng’s ideas to help the fish farm save money. He decides to hire him full-time. Peizhi is relieved to learn Jianfeng is not Ziheng’s father. She tells A-xiang she wants to marry him. Weibin and Qilin are disappointed when told she is not suited to an embryo transfer. The couple disagrees and their relationship becomes strained. Jing’en brings up the topic of surrogacy to Weibin again. They go overseas secretly to gather more information and do not tell Qilin. When Weibin returns, he finds that Qilin has left their home.
14	"Episode 14"	27 January 2017
Qilin has left a note for Weibin saying she cannot forgive him for cheating on her. In the hope of reversing the situation, Weibin posts touching words on social media to Qilin. Jing’en is guilt-stricken. She locates Qilin and goes to see her personally to persuade her to go home. Unable to control herself, Jing’en steals a bracelet at a shopping centre. Ziheng is bullied by his school mates. Hong Shan helps him out and takes him home. Jing’en chases him away. It is Chinese New Year’s eve. Weibin is depressed without Qilin. To his surprise, he finds her waiting at home for him to have reunion dinner with her. Hong Shan is shocked to learn Jing’en has been arrested. Shengquan calls off Dongbo and Peizhi’s wedding. He gives Peizhi an air-ticket back to her homeland. On the day before her departure, she enjoys playing fireworks with Dongbo and realises she can’t bear to leave him.
15	"Episode 15"	30 January 2017
Realising Peizhi is not going to come back, Dongbo gets worked up. He does not believe Shengquan, who says Peizhi doesn’t love him, and rushes to the airport to catch her but fails. Jing’en seems to have disappeared. Qilin and Weibin help to take care of Ziheng. It turns out that Hong Shan has bailed Jing’en out. Cold towards him, she even deliberately provokes him. He is so upset that he collapses. Jing’en takes Hong Shan to the doctor, then rushes him home. She goes back to their old house, where memories flood her mind. Her mother, Lisha, who has been missing for years, is suddenly there before her. Dongbo insists he will marry no one except Peizhi. Just as he is about to leave for Thailand to look for her, he learns she has given her most treasured possession to Jianfeng. He is stunned.
16	"Episode 16"	31 January 2017
Dongbo gives Jianfeng a wedding gown and a ring, and asks him to bring Peizhi back. Jing’en waits outside Ziheng’s school and watches him secretly. Lisha shows up and asks why she is avoiding Ziheng. Jing’en warns Lisha not to interfere in their lives. Jianfeng and Dayu travel to Thailand. Jianfeng gives the wedding gown to Peizhi, who finds a letter within the package. Moved after reading it, she returns to Singapore. In an attempt to lure Jing’en out, Ziheng pretends to leave home. She really appears, just as he has an asthma attack. Dongbo reminisces about the happy times with Peizhi. He bumps into Ziheng and Jing’en, who berate him for bringing Peizhi and Jianfeng together. Dongbo packs his bags and decides to stay away, to give his wounded heart a chance to heal. Lisha and Hong Shan have a heated argument. Hong Shan lets slip that Jing’en is not his biological daughter. Jing’en is shocked.
17	"Episode 17"	1 February 2017
Hong Shan suffers a minor stroke. Though his mobility is restricted, he insists Lian-jie should take him to Jing’en’s hearing the next day. Jing’en recalls how Hong Shan wanted to force her to abort her baby as soon as he knew she was expecting. It was Jianfeng who took her away and assumed the responsibilities of a father. Jing’en is not at the hearing. She chances upon Dongbo and confides in him about her special feelings for Jianfeng. Jianfeng accompanies Peizhi to the kelong to look for Dongbo. To avoid them, Dongbo and Jing’en hide. Qilin tells Weibin about the stress of taking care of Ziheng. She is afraid she is not doing a good job. Ziheng overhears and leaves home quietly. Jing’en discloses her innermost secret about being a kleptomaniac. Lisha realises she is the cause of it and breaks down. At this moment, the police arrive and arrest Jing’en. Peizhi asks Shengquan where she can find Dongbo. He tells her to give up.
18	"Episode 18"	2 February 2017
Hong Shan keeps looking for Jing’en and Ziheng despite his poor health. Lian-jie decides to stay and take care of Hong Shan instead of staying with her son. Feeling bad, he lies that he has reunited with Lisha. Jing’en is given an eight-week jail sentence. Lisha wants to take Ziheng overseas but the boy wants to stay and wait for his mother. Peizhi finds the handphone she had left at the fish farm. Reading through the text messages from Dongbo, she feels touched. Knowing Dongbo cannot forget Peizhi, Shengquan advises him to face her bravely. Lian-jie discovers Hong Shan is in a nursing home. She wants to bring him home. He refuses, as he doesn’t want to be a burden. Shengquan tells Jianfeng that Dongbo has been trying to bring Peizhi and him together. Jianfeng tells Peizhi he was not aware he was hindering their relationship. In turn, she encourages him to face his true feelings towards Jing’en. Shengquan wants to fire Jianfeng and Peizhi. To everyone’s surprise, Jianfeng asks Peizhi to marry him.
19	"Episode 19"	3 February 2017
Peizhi cannot understand why Jianfeng would stir up more misunderstanding by proposing to her. He explains that he wants to force Dongbo to show himself. Little do they expect Dongbo to remain unmoved. On the day of the marriage registration, Peizhi spots Dongbo outside the Registry of Marriages and goes in pursuit of him. Unfortunately, an accident occurs. Jianfeng is left paralysed. Guilt-stricken, Peizhi wants to take care of Jianfeng. He declines, and tells Dongbo to take Peizhi away with him. Jianfeng behaves coldly towards Peizhi, who tries hard to tolerate the rejection. She stays by him. Jianfeng asks Weibin to take care of Ziheng. Unwilling to accept the arrangement, Ziheng quarrels with the pregnant Qilin. Shengquan wants to return to his hometown, as his ancestral house is going to be torn down. Dongbo promises to look after the fish farm until he comes back.
20	"Episode 20"	6 February 2017
Qilin and Weibin do their part to nurture Ziheng to be a better person. He appreciates their painstaking efforts, and even comforts Qilin when she miscarries. Their relationship improves greatly. Jing’en is released from prison and Ziheng returns to her care. Thereafter, Qilin suggests to Weibin that they provide foster care for disadvantaged children. Jing’en promises to take care of Jianfeng for life. He is depressed at not being able to find a job and earn a living. Little does he expect Hong Shan to throw away his crutches and force him to stand up. After a long period of therapy, Jianfeng is finally able to walk with crutches. He forgives Hong Shan and takes him out of the nursing home. They live together as a family with Jing’en and Ziheng. Dongbo expands the fish farm. He puts Dayu in charge of the kelongs and gives him a 10 per cent share of the business. Dayu brings A-xiang back from Thailand and reunites with her. Dongbo and Peizhi’s relationship is at a standstill. Exasperated, Shengquan sends Peizhi back to Thailand. Dongbo rushes to the bus station, hoping to intercept her.

== Awards and nominations ==
=== Star Awards ===
Home Truly was nominated for four Star Awards in 2018, but did not win a single award.

The Star Awards are presented by Mediacorp.

Star Awards – Performance Awards
Accolades	Nominees	Category	Result
Star Awards 2018 Creative Achievement Award Ceremony 专业奖项颁奖礼	陈秀群 Chen Siew Khoon & 张湄纭 Chong Mei Yun	Best Screenplay 最佳剧本	Nominated

Star Awards – Acting Awards
Nominees	Accolades	Category	Result
Cruz Tay 郑凯泽	Star Awards 2018 Awards Ceremony 红星大奖2018 颁奖礼	Young Talent Award 青苹果奖	Nominated
Chen Shucheng 陈澍城	Star Awards 2018 Awards Ceremony 红星大奖2018 颁奖礼	Best Supporting Actor 最佳男配角	Nominated
Zhang Zhen Huan 张振寰	Star Awards 2018 Awards Ceremony 红星大奖2018 颁奖礼	Best Actor 最佳男主角	Nominated

== Music ==
Song title	Song type	Lyrics	Composer	Performer
只怕不够时间看你白头	Opening theme song	Eman Lam 林二汶		
至死不渝	Sub-theme song	于逸荛	Eman Lam	

== Development ==
Production began in August 2016, and wrap up its filming in November 2016.

The series consists of 20 episodes and aired from 10 January 2017.

== International broadcast ==
=== Malaysia broadcast ===
The drama was broadcast on NTV7 from Monday to Friday, at 18:00 MST starting 17 January 2018.

== See also ==
- Good Luck
- List of Home Truly episodes
- List of MediaCorp Channel 8 Chinese drama series (2010s)
