= Secret Garden (Singaporean TV series) =

- 秘密花园
- Starring: Tender Huang; Yvonne Lim; Paige Chua; Li Wen Hai; Benjamin Heng; Chen Guo Hua; Henry Heng; Qin Wei; Julie Tan; Sugie Phua; Rebecca Lim; Lin Ru Ping; Cavin Soh; Yi Ling; Wu Kai Shen
- Original language: Chinese
- No. of episodes: 13

Production
- Running time: approx. 45 minutes

Original release
- Network: Mediacorp Channel U (Singapore)
- Release: 29 December 2010

Secret Garden (秘密花园) is a Singaporean drama that aired on Mediacorp Channel U (Singapore). It debuted on 29 December 2010 and consists of 13 episodes.

== Cast ==
- Tender Huang
- Yvonne Lim
- Paige Chua
- Li Wen Hai
- Benjamin Heng
- Chen Guohua
- Henry Heng
- Qin Wei
- Julie Tan
- Sugie Phua
- Rebecca Lim
- Lin Ru Ping
- Cavin Soh
- Yi Ling
- Wu Kai Shen

== Synopsis ==
From Mediacorp: Cao Qi Ming (Tender Huang), a.k.a. Dr Beng, is an unconventional psychiatrist who specializes in treating children and young people. Although he appears to be lazy and uncouth, he is really a perceptive and sensitive doctor at heart.

Dr Beng is a squatter at his ex-schoolmate, Swan’s (Yvonne Lim) clinic. Swan is a no-nonsense art therapist, she comes across as aloof and cold but is patient, professional and devoted to her patients.

Tracy (Paige Chua) is a rookie social worker. She is acquainted with Dr Beng when she brought her first case, a schizophrenic youth, to him. Initially disagreeable of his method, she changes her mind when she sees his effective way of treating the patients.

Dr Beng has been searching relentlessly for the culprit of an accident that killed his twin brother 18 years ago. Swan accidentally discovers the truth but holds back from Dr Beng, she even prevents him from finding out the truth. What is the secret behind the accident? Dr Beng is caught between Swan and Tracy, who is the one he truly loves?
