= Double Blessings =

- 春风得意
- Genre: Comedy; Drama
- Written by: Soh Choon Heng
- Starring: Wang Sa; Lin Liyun; Xiang Yun; Li Wenhai; Chen Shucheng; Jack Neo; He Jie; Bai Yan
- Original language: Mandarin

Production
- Producer: George Woo
- Running time: 46 minutes
- Production company: Singapore Broadcasting Corporation

Original release
- Release: February 13, 1983

Double Blessings (Chinese: 春风得意) is a 1983 Singaporean made-for-television comedy-drama film starring Wang Sa, Lin Liyun, Xiang Yun, Li Wenhai, Chen Shucheng, Jack Neo, He Jie and Bai Yan.

== Cast ==
- Wang Sa
- Lin Liyun
- Xiang Yun
- Li Wenhai
- Chen Shucheng
- Jack Neo
- He Jie
- Bai Yan
