= Kin (Singaporean TV series) =

Singaporean drama

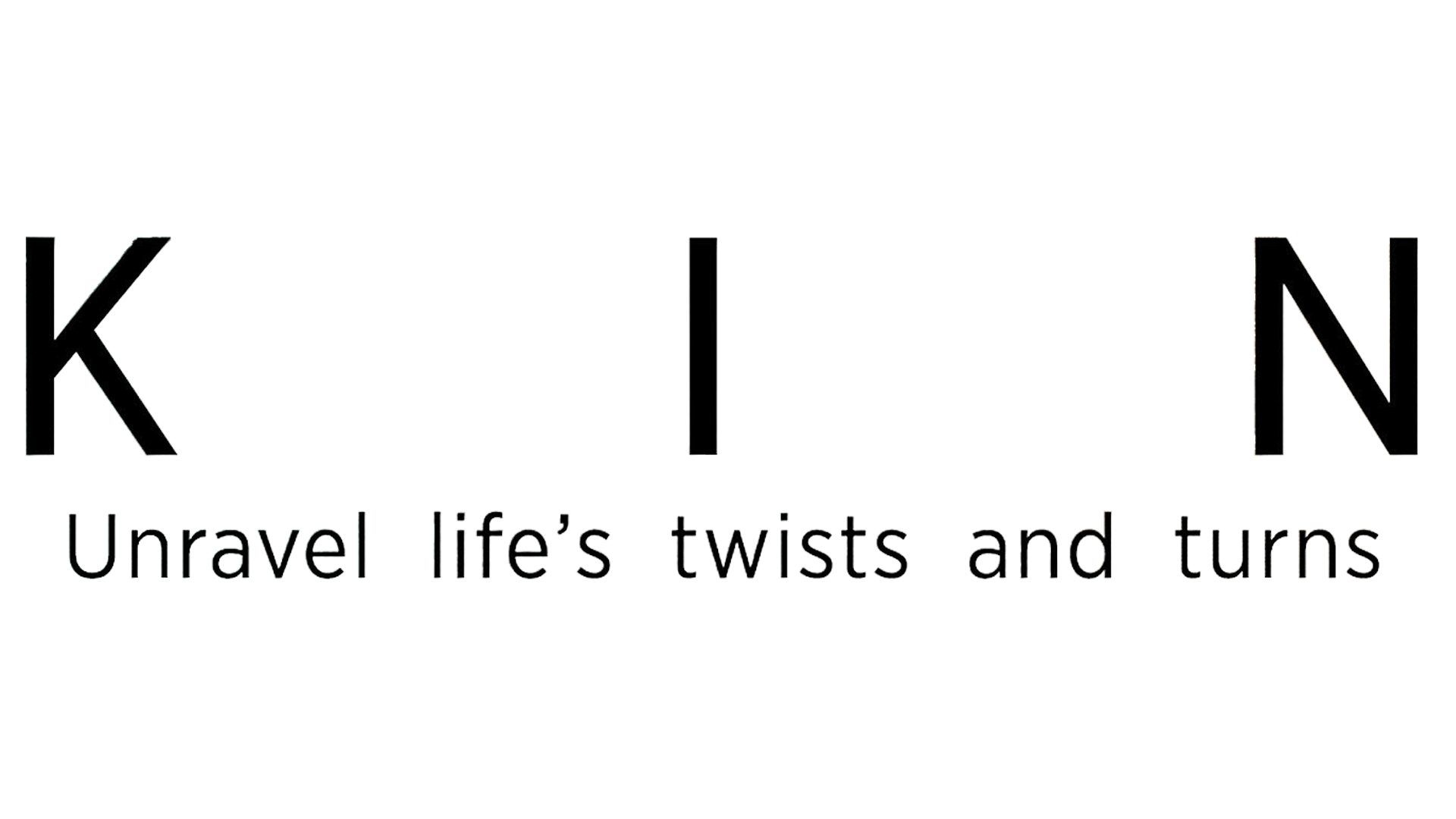
- Genre: Socio-drama; Dramedy; Family
- Written by: Sam Lee; Joanne Teo; Lillian Wang
- Directed by: J Cheung Pui Chung; Diana Salim; Manoj Prabhoda Chandran; Chan Bang Yuan; Ian Seymour; Christopher Lim; Gavin Lim
- Starring: Ariati Tyeb Papar; Mastura Ahmad; Rachel Wan; Margaret Lim; Hatta Said; Sofia Dendroff; Ebi Shankara; Sue Tan; Maxi Lim; Jason Godfrey; Carla Dunareanu; Gayathri Segaran; Jasmine Sim
- Theme music composer: Gary Leo; Serene Koong
- Opening theme: "Journey" by Gary Leo (Season 1) "Full Circle" by Serene Koong (Season 2-now)
- Country of origin: Singapore
- Original language: English
- No. of seasons: 4
- No. of episodes: 854

Production
- Executive producer: Ong Kuo Sin
- Production locations: Infinite Studios; Mediacorp Studios
- Running time: approx. 22-23 minutes per episode

Original release
- Network: Mediacorp Channel 5 Toggle (2018-2020); MeWATCH (2020-2022)
- Release: 1 October 2018 – 31 March 2022

Related
- Tanglin; Sunny Side Up; Aunty Lee's Deadly Delights; Happy Prince (2020)

Kin is a Singapore drama series produced by Mediacorp. It stars Ariati Tyeb Papar, Jasmine Sim, Sofia Dendroff, Rachel Wan, Margaret Lim, Sue Tan, Maxi Lim, Ebi Shankara, Carla Dunareanu, Gayathri Segaran, Mastura Ahmad, Hatta Said, and Jason Godfrey.

Kin premiered on 1 October 2018 on Mediacorp Channel 5, with a repeat telecast at 12am and 1.30pm the following weekday. The last episode aired on 31 March 2022 at 8.30pm as announced on 7 January 2022.

== Story ==
23 years ago, two baby girls, Ella (Jasmine Sim) and Yoke (Rachel Wan) were switched at birth. It was not an accident. Their mothers Loh May Wan (Margaret Lim) and Jessica Shelley (Sue Tan), rivals from primary school, attempt to unravel the truth behind the baby swap as they grapple with their birth-daughters who are their polar opposites in every way.

Deanna (Gayathri Segaren) finds out that she is terminally ill. She decides to entrust her husband, Kenneth (Ebi Shankara), to her best friend Ananya (Carla Dunareanu). Now, Ananya has to choose between James (Jason Godfrey), a man whom she has always admired, and Kenneth. Meanwhile, as dutiful wife Rosnani (Ariati Tyeb Papar) is tending to her boss and mother-in-law Adina's (Mastura Ahmad) orders at their family restaurant, her husband Zaryn (Hatta Said) is rendezvousing with his boss Syirah (Adlina Adil). Rosnani's life revolves around her family and now, her world is about to shatter.

== Cast ==
Actor	Character
The Balas
Gayathri Segaran	Deanna Bala (deceased due to brain tumor cancer)
Ebi Shankara	Kenneth Bala
Rishi Varman	Nathan Bala (child counterpart played by Kavisha Fernando)
Hasisha Nazir	Nina Bala (child counterpart played by Roushana Zahra)
Sage Elijah Wales	Nikky Bala (baby counterpart played by Aiden Viknesvaran)
The Hassans
Hatta Said	Zaryn Hassan
Ariati Tyeb Papar	Rosnani Johari
Mastura Ahmad	Adina Samsudin
Danial Ashriq	Zaryf Hassan
Sofia Dendroff	Zara Hassan
Khal Satria	Khaled Hassan
The Lohs
Thomas Ong	Steven Loh (Deceased)
Jasmine Sim	Ella Shelley
Jasmine Sim	Ella Loh
Margaret Lim	Loh May Wan
Maxi Lim	Loh Ah Hock
Timothy Lee	Handsome Loh
The Shelleys
Rachel Wan	Loh Ah Yoke
Rachel Wan	Yoke Shelley
Jason Godfrey	James Shelley
Sue Tan	Jessica Shelley
Aaron Khaled	Louis Shelley
Bridget Fernandez	Celia Shelley
Aaron Mossadeg	Julius Shelley (né de Cotta)
Lok Meng Chue	Eunice Shelley
Mel Ferdinands	Derek Shelley
Germaine Tong Xin Ci	Maxine Shelley
The Jamaluddins
Adlina Adil	Syirah Jamaluddin
Salif Hardie	Ashraff Jamaluddin
Nurul Nabila	Aminah Jamaluddin
The Chans
Frances Wong	Madeline Chan
Leong Chun Chong	Michael Chan
The Shens
Brian Ng	Shen Yang
Chua En Lai	Shen Tian
Irene Ang	Ling, Yang and Tian's Mother
Verana Lee	Dawn Shen
The Kwans
Elizabeth Lee	Emily Kwan
Johnny Lu	Charles Kwan
The Quahs
Charlie Goh	Matthew Quah
Bernard Tan	Wilson Quah
Related to The Shelleys
Carla Dunareanu	Ananya Davies
Joe Moreira	Adeeb Singh, Private Investigator (Deceased)
Michael Lee	Goh Lim Young
Eleanor Tan	Gwyneth Wynn, The Singapore Prattler Interviewer
Jumie Haron	Latifa Hamza, member of the Orchid Ladies Society
Chen Xi	Adam Seah (Deceased)
Related to The Lohs
Junaidah Eksan	Nurul Farah Suhaimi
Ling Ying	Debbie Yeo
Noah Yap	Rickson Ang
Related to The Hassans
Fazlyna Aziz	Dewi
Laura Kee	Natasha Chia
Syed Azmir	Razali Tahir
Amirah Yahya	Illya Saifuddin
Related to The Balas
Grace Kalaiselvi	Mathilda Harikrishnan
Narain	Ajay Devan
Other supporting characters
Karen Tan	Elizabeth Pang
Xenia Tan	Melody Zhou
Benjamin Eio	Joseph Wong
Lynnie Cheong	Helen Choy
Krissy Jesudason	Cameron De Rosa
Asher Su	Richard Tan
Nadia Ali	Arissa Jasni
Cheryl Lee	Jenny Lin
Cassandra Spykerman	Isabelle Maya
Marc Valentine	Jeffrey Yeoh
Andrew Lua	Alan Teo
Ferlyn Wong	Fiona Cheong
Aizuddiin Nasser	Syaiful Yakob
Melva Lee	Katelyn Palmer
Suhaimi Yusof	Helmi Johari
Bobby Tonelli	Donovan Rossi
Andrew Thio	Albert Song
June Lim HZ 林惠贞	Dr Poh
Mila Troncoso	Preschool Teacher
Dr Chng

== Episodes ==
Season	Number of episodes
1	121
2	247
3	244
4	242

== Music ==
The theme song "Save Me From Myself" for this series is written by Singaporean singer songwriter and producer Serene Koong.

== Special episodes ==
In June 2020, Mediacorp and social storytelling platform Wattpad organised a Kin fan fiction writing contest. They received 133 entries from Singapore and other countries. Four entries out of the winning entries were adopted and filmed by Mediacorp as spin-off episodes.

The four episodes, of 30 minutes each, are not related to the KIN storylines but of alternate stories if certain characters had made different choices. The episodes were shown on MeWATCH on 17 December 2020 and shown on Channel 5 weekly from 8 February 2021.
