= Star Awards for All-Time Favourite Artiste =

Singapore Chinese-language media award

Star Awards for All-Time Favourite Artiste 超级红星
- Current: Star Awards 2026
- Awarded for: Achievement of Winning "Top 10 Most Popular Male, Female Artistes Award or Most Popular Rising Stars" for Ten Years
- Country: Singapore
- Presented by: Mediacorp
- First award: 2004
- Currently held by: Romeo Tan; Carrie Wong (2026)

The Star Awards for All-Time Favourite Artiste is an award presented at the Star Awards to artistes who have won a cumulative ten Top 10 awards in either Male or Female artiste categories over a span of 10 award ceremonies; the top 10 wins do not need to be consecutive. All artistes conferred with this award will be ineligible for subsequent nominations for the Top 10 Most Popular Male/Female Awards. Starting from 2023, wins in the Top Three Most Popular Rising Star Award will also count towards the 10 wins.

== History ==
The award was first introduced in 2004, during the 11th ceremony.

The first three recipients of this award were Chew Chor Meng, Li Nanxing and Zoe Tay, having won their popularity awards from 1994 to 2003. This award was not presented in 2007, 2013 and 2018 as there were no artistes who were eligible to be presented to during those years. It will also not be awarded in the 2028 ceremony.

Huang Biren and Dasmond Koh, who were originally slated to receive their award in 2008 and 2020, respectively, received it a year later in 2009 and 2021, respectively, due to revision of the eligibility of the nominations in 2008 and the COVID-19 pandemic in Singapore in 2020.

== Recipients ==
Since its inception, the award has been given to 32 artistes. Carrie Wong and Romeo Tan are the most recent recipients in this category after winning the Top 10 Most Popular Male Artistes award and Top 10 Most Popular Female Artistes award respectively.

Desmond Tan, Guo Liang, Paige Chua and Ya Hui will receive the award in 2027 after winning the Top 10 Most Popular Male Artistes award and Top 10 Most Popular Female Artistes award respectively for 10 times.

Colour key

Artiste was awarded or expected to be awarded the All-Time Favourite Artiste award
Artiste won the Top 10 Most Popular Artiste award
Artiste was nominated for the Top 10 Most Popular Artiste award but failed to win
Artiste was not nominated for the Top 10 Most Popular Artiste award

Year	Artiste	Top 10 Most Popular Artistes award winning years																														
Year	Artiste	1994	1995	1996	1997	1998	1999	2000	2001	2002	2003	2004	2005	2006	2007	2009	2010	2011	2012	2013	2014	2015	2016	2017	2018	2019	2021	2022	2023	2024	2025	2026
2004	Zoe Tay	1	2	3	4	5	6	7	8	9	10	✔																				
2004	Chew Chor Meng	1	2	3	4	5	6	7	8	9	10	✔																				
2004	Li Nanxing	1	2	3	4	5	6	7	8	9	10	✔																				
2005	Fann Wong		1	2	3	4	5	6	7	8	9	10	✔																			
2005	Xie Shaoguang		1	2	3	4	5	6	7	8	9	10	✔																			
2006	Chen Liping	1	2	3	4	5	6	7	N	8	N	9	10	✔																		
2009	Huang Biren				1		2	3	4	5	6	7	8	9	10	✔																
2010	Christopher Lee				1	2	N	3	N	4	5	6	7	8	9	10	✔															
2010	Mark Lee					1	2	N	3	4	5	6	7	8	9	10	✔															
2011	Xiang Yun		N		N	N	N	1	2	3	4	5	6	7	8	9	10	✔														
2012	Tay Ping Hui						N	1	2	N	3	4	5	6	7	8	9	10	✔													
2014	Chen Hanwei		1	2				3	4	N	N	N	5	N	N	6	7	8	9	10	✔											
2014	Bryan Wong					1	2						3	4	5	6	7	8	9	10	✔											
2015	Vivian Lai								1		2	3			4	5	6	7	8	9	10	✔										
2015	Jeanette Aw										1	2	3	4	N	5	6	7	8	9	10	✔										
2016	Qi Yuwu											1	2	3	4	5	6	7	8	N	9	10	✔									
2016	Rui En												1	2	3	4	5	6	7	8	9	10	✔									
2017	Elvin Ng													1	2	3	4	5	6	7	8	9	10	✔								
2017	Joanne Peh											1	2	N	N	3	4	5	6	7	8	9	10	✔								
2017	Quan Yi Fong												1	2	3	4	5	6		7	8	9	10	✔								
2019	Kym Ng					1	2						N	3	4	N	N	N	5	6	N	7	8	9	10	✔						
2021	Dasmond Koh							1		2	3	4	N	N	5		N	N	6	7		8			9	10	✔					
2022	Zheng Geping															1	2	3	4	5	6	N	7		8	9	10	✔				
2022	Dennis Chew									N	N	N	N	N			1	2	3	4	5	N	6	7	8	9	10	✔				
2023	Rebecca Lim																		1	2	3	4	5	6	7	8	9	10	✔			
2023	Felicia Chin												N	1	2	3	4					5	6	7	8	9	N	10	✔			
2024	Ann Kok		1	2	3	4	5										N	6	7	8							9		10	✔		
2024	Jesseca Liu													1	2	3	4						5	6		7	8	9	10	✔		
2025	Yvonne Lim					1	N	N	N	N	N	N	N	N	N	2	3	4	5	6	7						8	9		10	✔	
2025	Pornsak															1	N	2	N	3	4	5	N	6	7	8	9	N		10	✔	
2026	Carrie Wong																					1	2	3	4	5	6	7	8	9	10	✔
2026	Romeo Tan																			N	1	2	N	3	4	5	6	7	8	9	10	✔
2027	Paige Chua																	N	1	N	N	2	N	3	4	5	6	7	8		9	10
2027	Ya Hui																				1	N	N	2	3	4	5	6	7	8	9	10
2027	Guo Liang				1	2	3						N	N	N	N	4	N	N	N	N	N	N	N	5	N	6	7	8	N	9	10
2027	Desmond Tan																				1	N		2	3	4	5	6	7	8	9	10

^{^[I]} Each year is linked to the article about the Star Awards held that year.
