= Pierre Png =

Singaporean actor (born 1973)

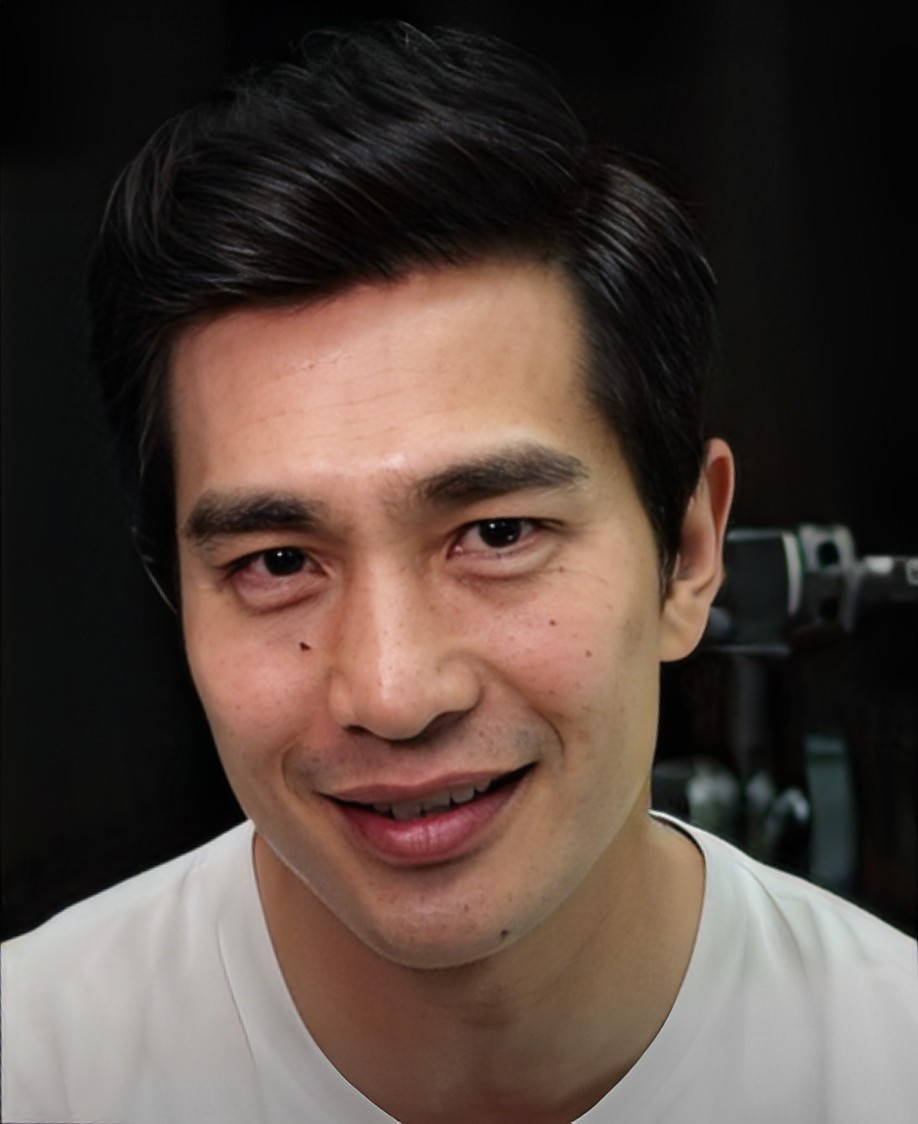
- Png in October 2017
- Born: Pierre Png Tiang Huat; 29 October 1973 (age 53); Singapore
- Education: Holy Innocents' High School
- Occupations: Actor; comedian; businessman
- Years active: 1997–present
- Agent: Mediacorp
- Spouse: Andrea De Cruz (m. 2003)
- Awards: Full list

Chinese name
- Traditional Chinese: 方展發
- Simplified Chinese: 方展发
- Hanyu Pinyin: Fāng Zhǎnfā

Pierre Png Tiang Huat (born 29 October 1973) is a Singaporean actor, comedian and businessman. He is known for starring in multiple Singaporean MediaCorp's Channel 5 and Channel 8's dramas which include The Gentlemen and When Duty Calls.

Early in his career, he was known for playing the comedic role of an architect named Anthony Phua Chu Beng in the long-running sitcom Phua Chu Kang Pte Ltd. He is also known for his role as a troubled and unhappy husband in the 2008 year-end blockbuster period drama The Little Nyonya, and as a villain in 2013 drama The Journey: A Voyage, the latter for which he won the Star Awards for Best Actor. In 2018, he appeared in the Hollywood film Crazy Rich Asians.

== Early life ==
Png was born on 29 October 1973 in Singapore, of Peranakan Chinese descent. He was educated at St Gabriel's Primary School and Holy Innocents' High School.

== Career ==
Png first encountered acting shortly after National Service in his role in the 1998 film Forever Fever. The role piqued his interest in acting, and he enrolled in an acting course. The same year, Png won the Channel 5 talent competition The Fame Awards. Png made his television debut on Phua Chu Kang Pte Ltd, and starred in several other Channel 5 productions. He later began acting in Chinese language dramas on Channel 8 and was nominated for the Most Popular Newcomer Award at the 2001 Star Awards. In 2006 he received his first Best Actor award nomination at the Star Awards 2006 for his role in The Shining Star. Png won the coveted award on his fourth nomination in 2014 for his vicious role Hei Long in MediaCorp's year-end mega-blockbuster The Journey: A Voyage. In 2014, he snared a leading role in the Channel 5 blockbuster drama Zero Calling and clinched the "Best Actor" award at the 19th Asian Television Awards (ATA). He co-starred in the Warner Bros. film Crazy Rich Asians, with Constance Wu and Henry Golding. The film marked his Hollywood feature film debut. In 2025, Png also started as a guest radio DJ, on Gold 905 with Mike Kasem and Vernetta Lopez, under their new show "Live! With Mike, Vernetta and Pierre" at Mondays and Tuesdays 8am-10am. He currently hosts the Gold 905 Morning show "The Breakfast Club with Gerald Koh, Sophie Gollifer and Pierre Png" on Tuesdays 8am-10am.

== Business ventures ==
In August 2021, Png opened a restaurant-bar called Tipsy Flamingo at Raffles City, which closed in 2025. He previously co-owned the restaurant-bar 3O1 Bar & Kitchen, which ended business in 2020.

== Personal life ==
Png has been married to former actress Andrea De Cruz since 2003. Png and De Cruz met and began dating in 1999. The relationship was made public after De Cruz suffered from liver failure due to consumption of Slim 10 pills, and Png donated half his liver to her. Under medical advice associated with the liver transplant, the couple does not have children.

== Filmography ==
=== Film ===
Year	Title	Role	Notes	Ref.
1998	Forever Fever	Richard		
2000	Chicken Rice War	Fenson Wong		
2002	Nothing to Lose	Somchai		
2002	The Eye	Dr Eak		
2006	Seed of Contention	Shinzo		
2018	Crazy Rich Asians	Michael Teo		

=== Television series ===
Year	Title	Role	Notes	Ref.
1999-2007	Phua Chu Kang Pte Ltd	Anthony Phua Chu Beng		
2001	The Hotel	James Poon		
2001	In Pursuit of Peace	Huang Changfeng		
2003	Holland V	Mo Yangyang		
2004	Room in My Heart	Li Jinsheng		
2005	Portrait of Home	Lin Dayang		
2005	Portrait of Home II	Lin Dayang		
2006	An Enchanted Life	Yang Zhiyun		
2006	The Shining Star	Wuming		
2006	Yours Always	Zhang Shaoqi		
2007	Dear, Dear Son-In-Law	Zhang Shunfa		
2007	Honour and Passion	Picasso Soh		
2007	Mars vs Venus	William		
2008	The Defining Moment	Sun Jiaming		
2008	The Little Nyonya	Chen Sheng		
2009	Your Hand in Mine	Fang Kai		
2010	The Score	Luo Shunan		
2011	A Tale of 2 Cities	Lin Wentao		
2011	The In-Laws	Xiao Jianhai		
2012	Rescue 995	Shi Zeming		
2012	Pillow Talk	He Tingkai		
2012	Beyond	Xu Wenbin		
2013	C.L.I.F. 2	Chen Yanjun		
2013	Marry Me (我要嫁出去)	Richard Li Shunli		
2013	The Journey: A Voyage	Hei Long		
2014	C.L.I.F. 3	Chen Yanjun		
2014	In The Name of Love	Song Xinren		
2014	Zero Calling	David Tan		
2014	Mata Mata 2	Peter Beh		
2015	Zero Calling 2	David Tan		
2015	Life Is Beautiful	Yu Yang		
2016	Beyond Words	Leo		
2016	The Gentlemen	Zhang Nailiang		
2017	Home Truly	Hong Jianfeng		
2017	When Duty Calls	Daniel Chen Jinbao		
2018	A Lonely Fish (寂寞鱼.听见)	Tim		
2018	VIC	Gordon Lee		
2018	Love at Cavenagh Bridge (加文纳桥的约定)	Lin Jiaming		
2018	You Can Be An Angel 3 (你也可以是天使3)	Yuan Bin		
2018	Missing	Sean Tan		
2019	Limited Edition (我是限量版)	Gao Ao		
2019	Voyage Of Love (爱。起航)	Wayne Wei En		
2019	Dear Neighbours (我的左邻右里)	Hugo		
2019	C.L.I.F. 5	Seow Fengze		
2020	My Guardian Angels	Su Dongyu		
2020	Jungle Survivor (森林生存记)	Jiang Yongxi		
2021	Mind Jumper (触心罪探)	Sensei		
2021	A World Of Difference (都市狂想)	He Jianwen		
2021	The Take Down (肃战肃绝)	Zhang Zheng		
2021	Leave No Soul Behind (21点灵)	Hugo Hau Zecong		
2021	This Land is Mine	Dennis Chiang		
2022	Home Again (多年后的全家福)	Cai Fengshou		
2022	Soul Doctor (灵医)	Hugo Hau Zecong		
2022	When Duty Calls 2 (卫国先锋2)	Daniel Chen Jinbao		
2022	Healing Heroes (医生不是神)	Wang Jingguo		
2023	I Do, Do I?	Hugo		
2024	Moments (时光倾城)	Yun Hanzuo		
2025	Moments			
2025	Decalcomania (ทวิญ) (折影双生)	Mark		
2026	Aunty Lee’s Deadly Delights	Noel Peters		

== Awards and nominations ==
Year	Ceremony	Category	Nominated work	Result	Ref.
2001	Star Awards	Best Newcomer	—N/a	Nominated	
2006	Star Awards	Best Actor	The Shining Star	Nominated	
2007	Star Awards	Top 10 Most Popular Male Artistes	—N/a	Nominated	
2009	Asian Television Awards	Best Actor in a Leading Role	The Little Nyonya	Nominated	
2009	Star Awards	Top 10 Most Popular Male Artistes	—N/a	Nominated	
2009	Star Awards	Best Actor	The Little Nyonya	Nominated	
2010	Star Awards	Top 10 Most Popular Male Artistes	—N/a	Nominated	
2011	Star Awards	Top 10 Most Popular Male Artistes	—N/a	Nominated	
2012	Star Awards	Top 10 Most Popular Male Artistes	—N/a	Won	
2012	Star Awards	Favourite Onscreen Couple (with Rui En)	The In-Laws	Nominated	
2013	Asian Television Awards	Best Actor in a Supporting Role	C.L.I.F. 2	Won	
2013	Star Awards	Top 10 Most Popular Male Artistes	—N/a	Nominated	
2013	Star Awards	Best Actor	Pillow Talk	Nominated	
2014	Asian Television Awards	Best Actor in a Leading Role	The Journey: A Voyage	Nominated	
2014	Asian Television Awards	Best Actor in a Leading Role	Zero Calling	Won	
2014	Star Awards	Top 10 Most Popular Male Artistes	—N/a	Nominated	
2014	Star Awards	Best Actor	The Journey: A Voyage	Won	
2014	Star Awards	Star Awards for Most Popular Regional Artiste (Malaysia)	—N/a	Nominated	
2014	Star Awards	Star Awards for Most Popular Regional Artiste (Indonesia)	—N/a	Nominated	
2014	Star Awards	Star Awards for Most Popular Regional Artiste (Cambodia)	—N/a	Nominated	
2015	Asian Television Awards	Best Actor in a Leading Role	Zero Calling 2	Won	
2015	Star Awards	Top 10 Most Popular Male Artistes	—N/a	Nominated	
2015	Star Awards	Star Awards for Most Popular Regional Artiste (Malaysia)	—N/a	Nominated	
2015	Star Awards	Star Awards for Most Popular Regional Artiste (Indonesia)	—N/a	Nominated	
2015	Star Awards	Star Awards for Most Popular Regional Artiste (China)	—N/a	Nominated	
2015	Star Awards	Star Awards for Most Popular Regional Artiste (Cambodia)	—N/a	Nominated	
2016	Asian Television Awards	Best Actor in a Supporting Role	Rise	Won	
2016	Star Awards	Top 10 Most Popular Male Artistes	—N/a	Nominated	
2017	Star Awards	Top 10 Most Popular Male Artistes	—N/a	Nominated	
2017	Star Awards	Best Actor	The Gentlemen	Nominated	
2018	Star Awards	Top 10 Most Popular Male Artistes	—N/a	Won	
2018	Star Awards	Best Actor	When Duty Calls	Nominated	
2019	Star Awards	Top 10 Most Popular Male Artistes	—N/a	Won	
2021	Star Awards	Best Actor	A Jungle Survivor	Nominated	
2021	Star Awards	Bioskin Most Charismatic Artiste Award	—N/a	Nominated	
2021	Star Awards	Top 10 Most Popular Male Artistes	—N/a	Won	
2022	Star Awards	Top 10 Most Popular Male Artistes	—N/a	Won	
2023	Star Awards	Top 10 Most Popular Male Artistes	—N/a	Nominated	
2025	Star Awards	Best Supporting Actor	Moments	Nominated	
