= Li Wenhai (actor) =

Singaporean actor (born 1957)

- Born: 1957 (age 68–69); Singapore
- Other name: Nong Neng
- Occupations: Actor; businessman
- Years active: 1981–present

Chinese name
- Traditional Chinese: 李文海
- Simplified Chinese: 李文海
- Hanyu Pinyin: Lǐ Wénhǎi

Li Wenhai (born c. 1957) is a veteran Singaporean actor. He has acted in various Singaporean television dramas.

== Career ==
In 1981, Li joined Singapore Broadcasting Corporation (SBC). In August 1991, after filming Jealousy Potion 100, Li applied to have an early termination to his acting contract with SBC and to transfer to the voice dubbing department. After eight months, in April 1992, he resigned from SBC.

After leaving SBC, Li opened a shop with friends selling Buddhist equipment at Balestier Shopping Center. The shop was eventually closed down in 1998 after the shop lease had finished and business was poor. Li was then invited by the producer and writer of Riding the Storm to act in the drama.

He left Media Corporation of Singapore (rebranding of SBC) in 2003 due to migraine.

In 2004, Li joined SPH MediaWorks.

== Filmography ==
=== Television series ===
1982

- Mother's Birthday Present 一束花
- Evening Breeze 晚来风急

1983

- Double Blessings 春风得意 as Li Ming Feng 李明峯
- Endless Knots 情结
- All that Glitters is Not Gold 捷径
- A Breakfast Story 早餐的故事
- CID '83 狮城勇探 as Johnson Wu Johnson吴

1984

- Spice of Life 四日谈 之《花圃的秘密》 as Bi Wen's Father 碧纹父亲
- The Awakening 雾锁南洋 之《狮城拂晓》 as Zhao Zi Liang 赵子良
- Blossoms in the Sun 阳光蜜糖 as Wu Tian Sheng 吴天生
- The Awakening 2 雾锁南洋II–风雨同舟/赤道朝阳
- Pursuit 怒海萍踪 as Cheng Han 成汉

1985

- The Unyielding Butterflies 铁蝴蝶 as Huang Ji Ze 黄季泽
- The Young Heroes 少年英雄 as Hui Tian Yu 惠天宇

1986

- Men of Valour 盗日英雄传 as Zhang Bao 张保
- The Samsui Women 红头巾 as A-Long 阿龙
- Crossroads 红绿灯 之《绿影》 as Du Sen 杜森
- The Bond 天涯同命鸟 as Chuan Qi Yi Fu 川崎一夫
- The Sword and the Song as Li Yu 李煜

1987

- Fury of the Dragon 冷月剑无言 as Xie Meng 谢猛
- Strange Encounters 奇缘 之《辗转红尘》、《阴差阳错》 as Zha Kang Nian, Jin Gong Zi 查康年、金公子

1988

- Airforce 空军 as Lu Wen Biao 陆文彪
- The Last Applause 舞榭歌台 as Ma Duan Cheng 马端成
- Mystery 迷离夜 之《梦》、《谜》 as Wei Xing 韦信
- Strange Encounters 2 奇缘2 之《阴阳妻》 as Wen Bu Ting 温布庭

1989

- A Long Way Home 燃烧岁月 as Zheng Wei Ting 郑伟庭
- Return of the Prince 丝路迷城 as Yi Bei Da Shi 一杯大师

1990

- Navy 壮志豪情 as Zhang Zhao Hua 张兆华
- The Winning Team 飞跃巅峰 as Fang Zhi Hui 方志晖

| Year | Title | Role | Notes | Ref |
|---|---|---|---|---|
| 1987 | Strange Encounters (Reincarnation) | | | |
| 1991 | Jealousy Potion 100 醋劲 100 | Ding Shihong | | |
| 1991 | Behind Bars 铁狱雷霆 | Lawyer | | |
| 1998 | Riding the Storm 陌生人 | Dong Shoulian | | |
| 1999 | From the Medical Files 2 医生档案II | Li Yufeng | | |
| 1999 | Stepping Out | Chen Jiageng | | |
| 1999 | Hero of the Times 新方世玉 | Fang De 方德 | | |
| 2000 | Hainan Kopi Tales | Long Fuyuan | | |
| 2001 | The Stratagem 世纪攻略 | Li Wanshan | | |
| 2001 | Heroes in Black | King of Kang | | |
| 2001 | Love Me, Love Me Not 真爱无敌 | Shen Fei | | |
| 2001 | The Challenge 谁与争锋 | Bai Jixiong | | |
| 2001 | The Hotel | Mr. Li | | |
| 2002 | Health Matters 一切由慎开始 之 受伤的羔羊 | Bryan's father | | |
| 2002 | The Vagrant | Jia Bo | | |
| 2002 | Fantasy 星梦情真 | Zheng Yi | | |
| 2002 | Blueprint - The Bra Shop | Trishaw Lee | | |
| 2003 | True Heroes | Ge Ming | | |
| 2003 | Home in Toa Payoh | Zheng Daba | | |
| 2004 | The Crime Hunters | Lin Xingwang | | |
| 2004 | To Mum with Love 非一般妈妈 | Bai Shicong | | |
| 2004 | Money No Problem | | | |
| 2004 | Beautiful Trio | Zeng Yingxiong | | |
| 2005 | Destiny | Siqi's father | | |
| 2007 | Man Of The House | Zhen Sheng Li | | |
| 2007 | Folks Jump Over The Wall 飞越佛跳墙 | Mr Han | | |
| 2007 | The Golden Path | Cai A-Hai | | |
| 2008 | My Destiny 幸福满贯 | Li Yaoguang | | |
| 2009 | Daddy at Home | Ted | | |
| 2009 | Together | Lin Yi | | |
| 2010 | No Limits | Chen Jianshun | | |
| 2010 | Unriddle | Cui Haodong | | |
| 2010 | The Family Court | Yao Xuehong | | |
| 2010 | Breakout | Brother Kun | | |
| 2012 | Joys of Life | Wu Renbi | | |
| 2012 | Don't Stop Believin' | Du Qiucheng | | |
| 2012 | Game Plan | Dad老爸 | | |
| 2012 | It Takes Two | Master Hong | | |
| 2013 | Start-Up! 创！ | Uncle Jerry | | |
| 2013 | I'm in Charge | Niu Pigu | | |
| 2013 | The Dream Makers | MD Chong | | |
| 2013 | The Journey: A Voyage | Chen Kuang | | |
| 2014 | Yes We Can! | Zhang Baida | | |
| 2014 | Served H.O.T. 烧。卖 | He Tingfeng | | |
| 2015 | Good Luck | Lin Xiaoping | | |
| 2015 | The Journey: Our Homeland | Yan Songtao | | |
| 2015 | The Dream Makers II | MD Chong | | |
| 2016 | The Truth Seekers | Pacai | | |
| 2016 | Peace & Prosperity | Huang Yuanzhe | | |
| 2016 | Peace & Prosperity | Huang Yaonan | | |
| 2016 | If Only I Could | Huo Zhiyong | | |
| 2017 | Home Truly | Su Shengquan | | |
| 2017 | Dream Coder | Fang Tianren | | |
| 2017 | The Lead | Zheng Jiang | | |
| 2017 | When Duty Calls | Chen Weirong | | |
| 2017 | While We Are Young | Zhuo Ziqian | | |
| 2018 | Reach For The Skies | Mark Xu | | |
| 2019 | My One In A Million 我的万里挑一 | Yan Xiaochuan | | |
| 2019 | Old Is Gold 老友万岁 | Cai Zhongxin | | |
| 2022 | You Can Be An Angel 4 你也可以是天使4 | Mei Guangzong | | |
| 2024 | Moments (时光倾城) | Qiu Qingyuan | | |
