= Mightiest Mother-in-Law =

- Also known as: MMIL; MightiestMIL
- 最强岳母
- Genre: Family; Romance; Comedy
- Written by: Seah Choon Guan 谢俊源; Chan Yoke Yeng 陈鈺莹
- Directed by: Loh Woon Woon 罗温温; Cheong Yuan Ting 张愿庭; Gao Shu Yi 高淑怡
- Starring: Chen Liping; Thomas Ong; Paige Chua; Tong Bingyu; Jeffrey Xu; Bonnie Loo
- Opening theme: 搞定 (literally: Get It) by Koong Chen Liang 龚振良 (大风吹)
- Ending theme: 最后才懂 (literally: Finally Understand) by Bonnie Loo
- Country of origin: Singapore
- Original language: Chinese
- No. of episodes: 24

Production
- Executive producer: Jasmine Woo 邬毓琳
- Running time: approx. 45 minutes (excluding advertisements)

Original release
- Network: Mediacorp Channel 8
- Release: 18 April – 19 May 2017

Related
- Legal Eagles; The Lead; Life Less Ordinary

Mightiest Mother-in-Law (Chinese: 最强岳母) is a 24 episode Singaporean drama produced and telecast on Mediacorp Channel 8. It stars Chen Liping, Thomas Ong, Paige Chua, Tong Bingyu, Jeffrey Xu and Bonnie Loo as the casts of this series.

== Plot ==
Qi Hongzhe is a married man with two children. He is married to Guan Shuhui and has an affair with Zhou Ke'en. Family problems come as Zhou Ke'en and Guan Shuhui fight for Qi Hongzhe. Meanwhile, Guan Shuhui has the help of her mother, Liew Xiuzhu (Chen Liping) to help her tackle Zhou Ke'en.

== Cast ==
- Johnny Ng 黄家强 as Qi Yinghao 齐英豪
- Lin Meijiao as Wu Xianglan 吴香兰
- Thomas Ong as Qi Hongzhe 齐宏哲
- Paige Chua as Guan Shuhui 管淑慧
  - Audrey Soh as young Guan Shuhui
- Chris Tong as Zhou Ke'en 周可恩
- Bonnie Loo as Qi Wanling 齐婉灵
- Violet Raine Ong 王雍溱 as Qi Zihan 齐梓涵
- Cruz Tay 郑凯泽 as Qi Zicong 齐梓聪

=== Liew (Xiuzhu)'s Family ===
Cast	Character	Description
Chen Liping 陈莉萍	Liew Xiuzhu 吕秀珠	Ms Chen (陈太太), Sister Lisa (Lisa姐), Old Hen (老母鸡), Old Witch (老巫婆); Younger Version portrayed by Caryn Cheng (庄薇霓): Guan Shuhui's mother; Qi Hongzhe's mother-in-law; Chen Jian's god-mother; Qi Zihan and Qi Zicong's grandmother
Jeffrey Xu 徐鸣杰	Chen Jian 陈健	Ken, Swindler/ Conman (死骗子), Cheap (犯贱): Liew Xiuzhu's god son; Qi Wanling's boyfriend; Guan Shuhui's god-younger brother

=== Other cast members ===
Cast	Character	Description
Cavin Soh	Zhang Zhongming 张忠鸣	Dr Chong (张医生), Jim: Psychiatrist; Zhou Ke'en's best friend and psychologist; Qi Hongzhe's NS friend; Guan Shuhui's boss and friend
Wang Yuqing	Brother Ji鸡哥	Villain: John's boss
Benjamin Josiah Tan 陈俊铭	John	Villain: Qi Wanling's online boyfriend; Brother Ji's subordinate
Andi Lim 林伟文	Guoqiang Jim 国强	English name Jim; Zhou Ke'en ex-lover and target; Zhang Zhongming's patient
June Lim HZ 林惠贞	Ex-Wife of Guoqiang Jim 国强	Revealed about Jim's past with Zhou Ke'en to Xiu Zhu & Chen Jian in Episode 22
Kenneth Chung	Himself	Host of Win A Car; Interviewed Chen Jian

== Production ==
Filming started in November 2016 and ended on 27 January 2017.

== Original Sound Track (OST) ==
No.	Title	Singer(s)
1	搞定 (Opening Theme Song)	Koong Chen Liang (DFC) 龚振良 (大风吹)
2	最后才懂	Bonnie Loo 罗美仪

== Accolades ==
Organisation	Year	Award	Nominees	Result	Ref
Star Awards	2018	Best Screenplay	Seah Choon Guan & Chan Yoke Yeng	Won	
Star Awards	2018	Young Talent Award	Violet Raine Ong	Nominated	
Star Awards	2018	Best Supporting Actress	Bonnie Loo	Nominated	
Star Awards	2018	Best Actress	Chen Liping	Nominated	
Star Awards	2018	Best Actress	Paige Chua	Nominated	
Star Awards	2018	Best Drama Serial	—N/a	Nominated	

== See also ==
- List of programmes broadcast by Mediacorp Channel 8
