= Paige Chua =

Singaporean actress (born 1981)

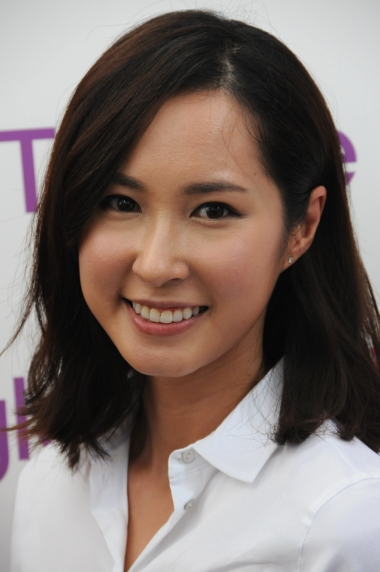
- Chua in 2014
- Born: 25 June 1981 (age 45); Singapore
- Education: Mayflower Secondary School; Serangoon Junior College; National University of Singapore (BA)
- Occupations: Actress; model; television host
- Years active: 2007–present
- Awards: Full list

Chinese name
- Traditional Chinese: 蔡琦慧
- Simplified Chinese: 蔡琦慧
- Hanyu Pinyin: Cài Qíhuì

Paige Chua Qi Hui (born 25 June 1981) is a Singaporean actress and television host.

== Early life ==
Chua was born in Singapore on 25 June 1981. She attended Mayflower Secondary School and Serangoon Junior College before graduating from the National University of Singapore with a Bachelor of Arts. She also represented Singapore in netball, as part of the National Youth Netball team between 1997 and 1999. She retired from competitive netball due to an injury.

== Career ==
After retirement from netball, Chua took up basic modeling class and subsequently modelled for four years.

Chua made her acting debut in Just in Singapore, where she was cast as the half-sister of Fiona Xie. In the latter part of 2008, she had 2 more roles in La Femme and Crime Busters x 2.

In 2010, Chua earned her first nomination for “Best Supporting Actress” in Star Awards 2010 for her character in The Dream Catchers. She made a guest appearance in Unriddle as Zhang Meilin, a girl with a dubious identity. The Score was Chua's first role as a lead actress where she played Zhou Tian Lan - an office lady with a mysterious background. She also acted in a drama series Secret Garden.

In 2011, Chua appeared in the movie It's a Great, Great World as Mu Dan, a nightclub dancer. Chua also starred alongside Chen Hanwei as his wife, Bai Xiu Ming a jovial workaholic in the drama Be Happy. Chua also hosted a lifestyle information program, LOHAS and The Activist's Journey II, an info-ed program in 2012. She won her first Star Award, Top 10 Most Popular Female Artiste at Star Awards 2012.

In 2013, Chua starred in numerous dramas including It's A Wonderful Life, 96°C Café, The Enchanted and Sudden. She had her first comedy role in the sitcom, The Recruit Diaries where she played LT Angie Chen. Chua also had a role in Okto as an inexperienced elementary school teacher in The School Bell Rings and hosted season 4 of RenovAID.

In 2014, Chua won Bottomslim Sexiest leg award at Star Awards 20. Her character as part of a chivalrous team in Against The Tide earned her a nomination for "Best Supporting Actress" in Star Awards 2015.

Chua won her second Top 10 Most Popular Female Artiste award at Star Awards 2015. In 2016, Chua participated in Beyond Words, a Malaysian production, and was one of the leading actresses for If Only I Could, The Gentlemen and Soul Reaper. Chua was also cast in the drama Hero. This character was seen as a breakthrough role and earned her a nomination for "Best Supporting Actress" in Star Awards 2017. In 2017, Chua played a Navy Captain in When Duty Calls, an NS50 drama in which Mediacorp Channel 8 collaborated with Ministry of Defence and the Ministry of Home Affairs. She won her third Top 10 Most Popular Female Artistes award in Star Awards 2017. Chua earned her first nomination for "Best Actress" for the housewife character she played in Mightiest Mother-in-Law, and won her fourth Top 10 Most Popular Female Artistes award at the Star Awards 2018.

Chua starred in the drama Blessings 2, a time travel drama between 2018 and 1918 where she played the belle of Lavender Street. Chua acted as a Nurse Clinician in the third installment of You Can Be An Angel.

== Filmography ==
=== Television series and film ===
Year	Title	Role	Notes	Ref.
2008	Just in Singapore	Lin Xiuzhen		
2008	La Femme	Qian Tingting		
2008	Crime Busters x 2	Yu Jie		
2009	The Dream Catchers	Zhang Xiaowei		
2009	Your Hand in Mine	Li Lifen		
2010	Unriddle	Zhang Meilin		
2010	The Score	Zhou Tianlan		
2010	Secret Garden	Tracy		
2011	Code of Honour	Tang Jiabao		
2011	Be Happy	Bai Xiuming		
2012	Poetic Justice	Liang Huiqin	Cameo	
2013	It's A Wonderful Life	Isabella		
2013	96°C Café	Luo Xijie	Cameo	
2013	The Enchanted	Chen Jingli		
2013	The Recruit Diaries (阿兵新传)	Angie Chen Yanxi		
2013	The School Bell Rings	Miss Lee		
2013	Sudden	Zhao Kexuan	Cameo	
2014	Against The Tide	Zhang Jingxuan		
2015	Good Luck	Fang Enqi		
2015	Let It Go (分手快乐)	Emily Xie	Cameo	
2015	Love? (限量爱情)	Rachel Yap		
2015	Families on the Edge (一家都不能少)	Karen Yeo		
2015	Code of Law (Season 3)	Amy	Cameo	
2015	Mind Game	Feng Xuezhi / Liang Huixin		
2016	Beyond Words	Vivian		
2016	If Only I Could	Huo Xiwen		
2016	The Gentlemen	Su Meidai		
2016	Soul Reaper (勾魂使者)	Angela		
2016	Hero	Ou Jinxuan		
2017	Mightiest Mother-in-Law	Guan Shuhui		
2017	When Duty Calls	Shen Yixuan		
2017	My Friends From Afar	Yang Tianning		
2018	VIC	Nicole Chong	Cameo	
2018	Love at Cavenagh Bridge (加文纳桥的约定)	He Zishan / Hong Ying		
2018	Blessing 2 (祖先保佑2)	Zheng Juehui		
2018	You Can Be An Angel 3 (你也可以是天使3)	Xia Yutian		
2019	Voyage Of Love (爱。起航)	Chen Hailin		
2019	Playground (游乐场)	Susannah Kok		
2019	I See You (看见看不见的你)	Cheryl	Cameo	
2019	All Is Well (你那边怎样，我这边OK)	Lin Zhiling		
2019	The Good Fight (致胜出击)	Zhuang Shuya		
2019	A World Of Difference (都市狂想)	Wu Xinyi		
2020	Happy Prince (快乐王子)	Zhang Yuwen		
2020	Super Dad (男神不败)	Ye Ling Zhi		
2021	Soul Old Yet So Young (心里住着老灵魂)	Wu Xinji		
2021	The Heartland Hero	Bao Qingtian		
2021	Watch Out ! Alexius (小心啊！谢宇航)	Sun Jieshan		
2022	Healing Heroes (医生不是神)	Zhou Yishi		
2022	When Duty Calls 2 (卫国先锋2)	Shen Yixuan		
2024	Moments (时光倾城)	Gu Yuexin		

=== Hosting ===
Year	English title	Mandarin title	Notes	Ref.
2012	LOHAS	乐活好正点		
2012	The Activist Journey II	仁心侠旅 II		
2013	RenovAID Season 4	—N/a		
2014	Green Footprints	绿悠游		
2015	Women Warriors	巾帼女将		
2015	Unusual School	不一样的学校		

== Discography ==
=== Compilation albums ===
Year	English title	Mandarin title	Ref.
2013	MediaCorp Music Lunar New Year Album 13	群星贺岁金蛇献祥和	
2015	MediaCorp Music Lunar New Year Album 15	新传媒群星金羊添吉祥	
2016	MediaCorp Music Lunar New Year Album 16	新传媒群星金猴添喜庆	
2017	MediaCorp Music Lunar New Year Album 17	新传媒群星咕鸡咕鸡庆丰年	
2018	MediaCorp Music Lunar New Year Album 18	新传媒群星阿狗狗过好年	
2019	MediaCorp Music Lunar New Year Album 19	新传媒群星猪饱饱欢乐迎肥年	
2020	MediaCorp Music Lunar New Year Album 20	裕鼠鼠纳福迎春了	
2021	MediaCorp Music Lunar New Year Album 21	福满牛年Moo Moo乐	

== Awards and nominations ==
Organisation	Year	Category	Work	Result	Ref.
Star Awards	2009	Best Newcomer	—N/a	Nominated	
Star Awards	2010	Best Supporting Actress	The Dream Catchers (as Zhang Xiaowei)	Nominated	
Star Awards	2011	Top 10 Most Popular Female Artistes	—N/a	Nominated	
Star Awards	2012	Top 10 Most Popular Female Artistes	—N/a	Won	
Star Awards	2013	Top 10 Most Popular Female Artistes	—N/a	Nominated	
Star Awards	2014	Top 10 Most Popular Female Artistes	—N/a	Nominated	
Star Awards	2014	BottomSlim Sexiest Legs Award	—N/a	Won	
Star Awards	2014	Star Awards for Most Popular Regional Artiste (Indonesia)	—N/a	Nominated	
Star Awards	2015	Top 10 Most Popular Female Artistes	—N/a	Won	
Star Awards	2015	Tokyo Bust Express Sexy Babe Award	—N/a	Nominated	
Star Awards	2015	iWeekly Best Dressed Award	—N/a	Won	
Star Awards	2015	Best Supporting Actress	Against The Tide (as Zhang Jingxuan)	Nominated	
Star Awards	2016	Top 10 Most Popular Female Artistes	—N/a	Nominated	
Star Awards	2016	Best Supporting Actress	Good Luck (as Fang Enqi)	Nominated	
Star Awards	2017	Top 10 Most Popular Female Artistes	—N/a	Won	
Star Awards	2017	Best Supporting Actress	Hero (as Ou Jingxuan)	Nominated	
Star Awards	2017	Bioskin Flawless Skin Award	—N/a	Nominated	
Star Awards	2018	Top 10 Most Popular Female Artistes	—N/a	Won	
Star Awards	2018	Best Actress	Mightiest Mother-in-Law (as Guan Shuhui)	Nominated	
Star Awards	2019	Top 10 Most Popular Female Artistes	—N/a	Won	
Star Awards	2021	Top 10 Most Popular Female Artistes	—N/a	Won	
Star Awards	2022	Top 10 Most Popular Female Artistes	—N/a	Won	
Star Awards	2023	Top 10 Most Popular Female Artistes	—N/a	Won	
Star Awards	2025	Top 10 Most Popular Female Artistes	—N/a	Won	
