= When Duty Calls =

2017 Singaporean television series

- 卫国先锋
- Genre: Contemporary; Friendship; Romance; Military
- Written by: Seah Choon Guan; Tang Yeow
- Directed by: Png Keh Hock; Doreen Yap; Martin Chan; Khoo Khiang Ting
- Starring: Desmond Tan; Romeo Tan; Pierre Png; Paige Chua; Felicia Chin
- Opening theme: 以刚克刚 by Desmond Ng and Kenny Khoo
- Ending theme: 1) 以为的以为 by Alfred Sim and Tay Kewei; 2) 一直都在 by Alfred Sim; 3) 关怀新方式 by Desmond Tan and Felicia Chin
- Country of origin: Singapore
- Original language: Chinese
- No. of episodes: 20

Production
- Executive producer: Chong Liung Man
- Running time: approx. 45 minutes (excluding advertisements)

Original release
- Network: Mediacorp Channel 8
- Release: 31 July – 25 August 2017

Related
- Honour and Passion (2007); When Duty Calls 2 (2022)

When Duty Calls (Chinese: 卫国先锋) is a 20-episode Singaporean drama produced and telecast on Mediacorp Channel 8 in 2017. It was made to commemorate 50 years of National Service in Singapore. It is sponsored by the Ministry of Defence and Ministry of Home Affairs.

It stars Desmond Tan, Romeo Tan, Pierre Png, Paige Chua, and Felicia Chin as the main cast of the series.

== Cast ==
=== Main cast ===
- Desmond Tan as Lu Junguang (陆俊光), a sergeant in the Singapore Army
- Romeo Tan as Xu Longbin (许龙斌), a captain in the Singapore Army
- Pierre Png as Chen Jinbao (陈金保), Corporal in the Singapore Army
  - Chen Jinbao (陈金保) as young Chen
- Paige Chua as Shen Yixuan (沈宜萱), a captain at the Republic of Singapore Navy
- Felicia Chin as Bai Jingyu (白静雨), a senior brigade medic with the rank of Military Expert 2

=== Supporting cast ===
Cast	Character	Description
Shane Pow	Yao Weiguo (姚卫国)	Navy (Sea) Officer Cadet - Yeoh Wei Guo (Midshipman); Gordon Yeoh, Mate/Buddy (伙伴), Recruit Yeoh, Sabo King: Yao Yixin's brother; Lu Xianfeng's Basic Military Training buddy; Shen Yiyun's ex-boyfriend
Richie Koh	Lu Xianfeng (陆先锋)	Air Force (Air) Officer Cadet - Loke Xian Feng (Air Warfare Officer (C3); Ah Boy (阿Boy), Mummy Boy, Mate/Buddy (伙伴), Recruit Loke: Lu Junguang's nephew; Lu Meiguang's son; Yang Yongzheng's son; Yao Weiguo's Basic Military Training buddy; Shen Yiyun's boyfriend
Jasmine Sim	Shen Yiyun (沈宜芸)	Air Force (Air) Air Force Engineer - Military Expert 1 Sim Yi Yun Air Force Engineering (AFE) (Maintenance); Cloudie Sim: Yao Weiguo's ex-girlfriend; Lu Xianfeng's girlfriend; Shen Yixuan's sister
Kym Ng	Lu Meiguang (陆美光)	Teenage version portrayed by Cai Bei'er (蔡贝儿); Ms Lu (陆小姐), Little White Boat (小白船): Ding Ji Breadshop's owner and boss; Kopi Kia's previous employee; Yang Yongzheng's ex-lover; Lu Xianfeng's mother; Lu Junguang's older sister; Chen Jinbao's girlfriend and long lost childhood friend; Chen Weirong's previous employee
Mei Xin	Yao Yixin (姚一心)	Germaine Yeoh, B (宝贝), Lawyer Yao (姚律师)
James Seah	Xie Mingyao (谢明耀)	Navy (Sea); Captain - Seah Ming Yao (Divisional Officer); Roger That (收到): Shen Yixuan's ex-boyfriend; Lu Junguang's best friend and rival in love; (Deceased - 4 years ago by involved with a truck accident)
Darryl Yong	Li Hongxun (李宏讯)	Police; Deputy Superintendent (NS) - Lee Hong Xun (Patrol); Roger That (收到), Lawyer Li (李律师): Lawyer; Xu Longbin's best old-friend; Yao Yixin's colleague; In love with Shen Yixuan
Zheng Geping	Yang Yongzheng (杨勇正)	Air Force (Air); Teenage version portrayed by Li Bin (李彬) Lieutenant Colonel - Yeo Yongzheng Fighter SQN (Commanding Officer); Michael Yeo: Tina's husband; Lu Meiguang's ex-lover; Lu Xianfeng's father; Lu Junguang's brother-in-law; Chen Jinbao's rival in love; Shen Yiyun's boss; Chen Weirong's previous employee
Hong Huifang	Zhu Cuihua (朱翠花)	Auntie Hua (花姐): Kopi Kia coffeehouse's lady boss; Xu Longbin's lady-boss and god-mother; Chen Weirong's wife; Chen Jinbao's mother
Li Wenhai	Chen Weirong (陈伟荣)	Uncle Rong (荣叔): Kopi Kia coffeehouse's older boss; Xu Longbin's boss; Zhu Cuihua's husband; Chen Jinbao's father; Yang Yongzheng and Lu Meiguang's previous boss; Suffered from heart attack

=== Guest appearances ===
Cast	Character	Description
Tommy Wong	Lu Jiading (陆家钉)	Lu Meiguang and Lu Junguang's father; Lu Xianfeng's grandfather
Zack Lim	Fuji	Mount Fuji (富土山): Kopi Kia's employee; Chen Weirong and Zhu Cuihua's employee and chef; In love with Lu Meiguang
Caryn Cheng	Summer	Sweetheart (甜蜜): Chen Jinbao's ex-lover
Dylan Quek	Jeffery Poh	Navy (Sea); Jeff: Xie Mingyao and Shen Yixuan's best friend
Gary Tan	Nick Goh	Navy (Sea): Shen Yixuan's cadet
Brian Ng	Roy Ho	Navy (Sea): Yao Weiguo's platoon mate; Shen Yixuan's cadet
Benjamin Cheah		Part time Police Officer (NS) - (Patrol): Li Hongxun's colleague
Amy Cheng	Tina	Yang Zhongzheng's wife
Terence Tay	Captain Khoo	Air Force (Air): Yang Yongzheng's friend; Lu Xianfeng's sir
Pornsak Prajakwit	Chong	Navy (Sea): Yao Weiguo's platoon mate; Shen Yixuan's cadet

== Accolades ==
Ceremony	Year	Category	Nominee(s)	Result	Ref.
Star Awards	2018	Best Director	Png Keh Hock	Nominated	
Star Awards	2018	Best Director	Martin Chan	Won	
Star Awards	2018	Best Screenplay	Seah Choon Guan & Tang Yeow	Nominated	
Star Awards	2018	Best Actor	Desmond Tan	Won	
Star Awards	2018	Best Actor	Pierre Png	Nominated	
Star Awards	2018	Best Supporting Actor	Shane Pow	Nominated	
Star Awards	2018	Best Supporting Actress	Kym Ng	Won	
Star Awards	2018	Best Supporting Actress	Mei Xin	Nominated	
Star Awards	2018	Best Newcomer	Richie Koh	Nominated	
Star Awards	2018	Best Theme Song	"以刚克刚" by Desmond Ng and Kenny Khoo	Won	
Star Awards	2018	Best Drama Serial	—N/a	Won	

== Soundtrack ==
No.	Song title	Artist
1)	以刚克刚 (Main song for the series)	Desmond Ng; Kenny Khoo
2)	以为的以为 (Song for Lu Junguang, Shen Yixuan, and Bai Jingyu)	Alfred Sim; Tay Kewei
3)	一直都在 (Song for Xu Longbin and Yao Yixin)	Alfred Sim
4)	关怀新方式 (Song for Chen Jinbao and Lu Meiguang)	Desmond Tan; Felicia Chin
5)	关怀方式 (Song for Chen Jinbao and Lu Meiguang)	Chen Hanwei
6)	关怀方式 (Unplugged Version) (Song for Chen Jinbao and Lu Meiguang)	Pierre Png
7)	I Just Wanna Be Loved (Song for Shen Yiyun, Yao Weiguo, and Lu Xianfeng)	Tim Ellis

== Development and production ==
Filming began in February 2017 and was completed in May. The series was filmed in collaboration with the Ministry of Defence (MINDEF) and Ministry of Home Affairs (Home Team).

== See also ==
- C.L.I.F.
