= Felicia Chin =

Singaporean actress (born 1984)

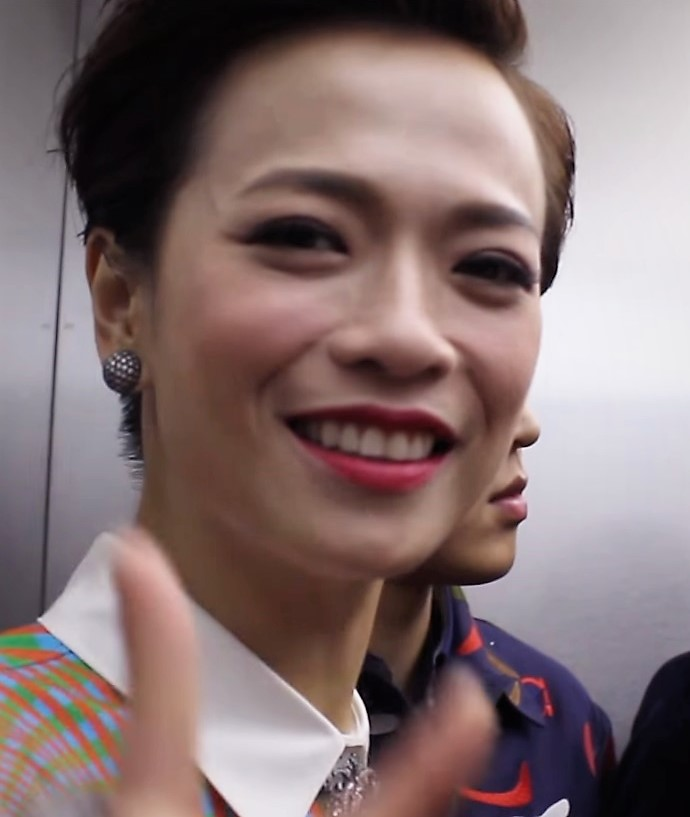
- Chin at Star Awards 2017
- Born: 24 October 1984 (age 42); Singapore
- Other names: Chen Fengling; Chen Jingxuan
- Education: Tanjong Katong Girls' School; National University of Singapore (dropped out)
- Alma mater: Victoria Junior College
- Occupations: Actress; host; content creator; model
- Years active: 2003–present
- Spouse: Jeffrey Xu (m. 2022)
- Awards: Full list

Birth name
- Traditional Chinese: 陳鳳玲
- Simplified Chinese: 陈凤玲
- Hanyu Pinyin: Chén Fènglíng

Former stage name (2008–2013)
- Traditional Chinese: 陳靚瑄
- Simplified Chinese: 陈靓瑄
- Hanyu Pinyin: Chén Jìngxuān

Felicia Chin Foong Ling (born 24 October 1984) is a Singaporean actress, host and content creator who was named as one of the Seven Princesses of Mediacorp in 2006. In 2013, Chin decided to use her given Chinese name instead for her acting career.

== Early life ==
Chin was educated at Tanjong Katong Girls' School and Victoria Junior College (VJC), where she was schoolmates with fellow artiste Lee Teng. As an avid softball player, she joined Singapore's national softball team in 2000, becoming the youngest member ever to join the team. She left the team three years later. She also won the National Inter-School A Division Softball Girls championship title with VJC in 2002.

In May 2010, Chin announced that she would be switching to part-time acting to study for a BBA degree in the National University of Singapore Business School. In 2012, Chin told the Singaporean magazine 8 Days that she would be in Shanghai for one year as part of the NUS Overseas Colleges programme.

In 2013, Chin announced that she would be returning to full-time acting without completing her studies. She decided to drop her stage name as well and use her given name instead.

== Career ==
In 2003, Chin participated in MediaCorp Channel 8's Star Search Singapore television programme and emerged as overall female champion of the contest. Chin worked at MediaCorp as an actress, making her debut role in the 2003 television drama Always on My Mind. In 2006, she had her first female lead role in The Beginning, a Singapore-Malaysia co-production. Chin is one of the Top 10 Most Popular Female Artistes of MediaCorp.

At Star Awards 2006, Chin was nominated for Best Supporting Actress. At the Star Awards 2009 and Star Awards 2015, Chin was nominated for Best Actress.

In 2008, Chin took on the Chinese stage name Chen Jingxuan (陈靓瑄), after being advised to do so.

In 2014, Chin, with Sora Ma, open a retro-themed cafe, The Mama Shop, in Chinatown, Singapore. The cafe closed in August 2015.

In May 2015, Chin opened a seafood stall, Wholly Crab, at Satay By the Bay.

On 23 June 2022, Chin announced that her last day with Mediacorp would be 30 June, and she would be taking up a new job at faith-based platform Hai Hao Ma.

Chin cites veteran actress Huang Biren as someone whom she looks up to in the industry.

== Personal life ==
In 2001, Chin's father died due to cancer, thus wishing for a complete family in the future in a 2004 interview.

Chin has been a practising Christian since 2015.

On 22 October 2022, Chin married fellow Mediacorp artiste, Chinese actor, Jeffrey Xu. They had been dating since 2015.

== Filmography ==
=== Film ===
Year	Title	Role	Notes	Ref.
2010	Love 50% (爱情折扣)	Wu Hanni	Television film	

=== Television series ===
Year	Title	Role	Notes	Ref.
2003	Always on My Mind (无炎的爱)	Michelle		
2004	Chronicles of Life (我爱我家真情实录)	Zhang Huili		
2004	A Child's Hope II (孩有明天2)	Kit		
2004	The Champion	Wang Tong		
2005	Portrait of Home	Fu Baobei		
2005	Portrait of Home II	Fu Baobei		
2006	Women of Times	Ou Xiangyun		
2006	Love at 0°C	Mai Xiaoling		
2006	A Million Treasures	Lin Xiaobao		
2006	The Beginning	Shi Jianing		
2007	Let It Shine	Guo Yaoyao		
2007	Honour and Passion	Ouyang Peipei		
2008	Love Blossoms	Tao Haitong		
2008	Perfect Cut	Cherry Princess	Cameo	
2008	The Little Nyonya	Anqi	Cameo	
2009	The Ultimatum	Sun Min		
2009	Baby Bonus	Apple		
2009	The Golden Path	Lin Fei		
2010	The Glittering Days	Xu Wenhui		
2010	No Limits	You Yongxin		
2011	Love Thy Neighbour	Wang Tianhu		
2012	Don't Stop Believin'	Du Siman		
2014	Scrum (冲锋!)	Huang Zhaonan		
2014	In The Name of Love	Pan Xiaomin		
2014	The Journey: Tumultuous Times	Zhang Min		
2015	Love is Love: Sunshine	Janelle		
2015	Love? (限量爱情)	Felicia Lau		
2015	The Journey: Our Homeland	Zhang Min		
2016	Life - Fear Not	Zhuang Daohan		
2016	Hero	Cathy	Cameo	
2017	Legal Eagles	Tang Meiqi		
2017	2589 Days Apart	Wu Weiwei		
2017	When Duty Calls	Bai Jingyu		
2017	Eat Already? 3	Zeng Qiqi		
2018	Life Less Ordinary	Lin Shuqi		
2018	Love at Cavenagh Bridge (加文纳娇的约定)	Wu Feifei		
2018	20 Days	Jess		
2019	Dear Neighbours (我的左邻右里)	Abbey Peng Xiyue		
2019	Old Is Gold (老友万岁)	Liao Meifang		
2019	From Beijing to Moscow	Kloudiia		
2020	A Jungle Survivor (森林生存记)	Olivia		
2021	Leave No Soul Behind (21点灵)	Gu Xin		
2022	When Duty Calls 2 (卫国先锋 2)	Bai Jingyu		
2023	I Do, Do I?	Tu Youmi		

=== Variety show hosting ===
Year	Title	Notes	Ref.
2013	Are You Up For It? (大明星, 你行吗？)		

Note: Unless otherwise specified, all television appearances are in Chinese.

== Discography ==
Year	Song title	Notes	Ref.
2005	拜年	Part of Mediacorp Lunar New Year Album Compilation 2005: With Qi Yuwu, Jeanette Aw, Fiona Xie & Julian Hee	
2007	小拜年	Part of Mediacorp Lunar New Year Album Compilation 2007 (《群星贺岁 – 金猪庆丰圆》): With Ng Chee Yang, Adam Chen, Teresa Tseng & Renfred Ng	
2008	恭喜大家过新年	Part of Mediacorp Lunar New Year Album Compilation 2008 (《群星贺岁 – 金鼠庆团圆》): With Nat Ho, Elvin Ng & Jesseca Liu	
2008	大团圆	Part of Mediacorp Lunar New Year Album Compilation 2008 (《群星贺岁 – 金鼠庆团圆》): With Nat Ho, Elvin Ng & Jesseca Liu	
2009	新年到	Part of Mediacorp Lunar New Year Album Compilation 2009 (《群星贺岁 – 福牛迎瑞年》): Qi Yuwu, Jeanette Aw, Joanne Peh, Pierre Png & Nat Ho	
2015	万年红五羊献祥瑞	Part of Mediacorp Lunar New Year Album Compilation 2015 (《群星贺岁 – 金羊添吉祥》): With Jeanette Aw, Desmond Tan & Romeo Tan	
2015	One Family (我们一家人)	Song to celebrate SG50.	
2015	落脚处	Sub Theme song for Life - Fear Not	
2016	凑热闹吉祥传四方	Part of Mediacorp Lunar New Year Album Compilation 2016 (《群星贺岁 – 金猴添喜庆》): With Carrie Wong, Aloysius Pang & Jeffrey Xu	
2017	关怀新方式	Sub Theme song for When Duty Calls: With Desmond Tan	
2017	小人物向前冲	Theme Song for Life Less Ordinary: With Xiang Yun, Chen Liping, Aileen Tan, Romeo Tan, Jeffrey Xu, Ian Fang, Bonnie Loo & Jayley Woo	
2017	Waiting for Love (等爱)	Sub Theme Song for Life Less Ordinary: With Romeo Tan	

== Awards and nominations ==
Year	Award	Category	Nominated work	Result	Ref.
2004	Star Awards	Best Newcomer	—N/a	Nominated	
2005	Star Awards	Top 10 Most Popular Female Artistes	—N/a	Nominated	
2006	Star Awards	Best Supporting Actress	Women of Times (as Ou Xiangyun)	Nominated	
2006	Star Awards	Top 10 Most Popular Female Artistes	—N/a	Won	
2007	Star Awards	Best Classic Scenes Award	The Champion (as Wang Tong)	Won	
2007	Star Awards	Screen Sweetheart (2000s)	—N/a	Won	
2007	Star Awards	Top 10 Most Popular Female Artistes	—N/a	Won	
2009	Star Awards	Best Actress	The Golden Path (as Lin Fei)	Nominated	
2009	Star Awards	Top 10 Most Popular Female Artistes	—N/a	Won	
2010	Star Awards	Top 10 Most Popular Female Artistes	—N/a	Won	
2010	Star Awards	Favourite Female Character	Love Blossoms II (as Tao Haitong)	Nominated	
2010	Star Awards	Favourite Female Character	Baby Bonus (as Huang Liping)	Nominated	
2010	Star Awards	Favourite Female Character	The Ultimatum (as Sun Min)	Nominated	
2013	Star Awards	Favourite Female Character	Don't Stop Believin' (as Du Siman)	Nominated	
2015	Star Awards	Top 10 Most Popular Female Artistes	—N/a	Won	
2015	Star Awards	Favourite Female Character	In the Name of Love (as Pan Xiaomin)	Nominated	
2015	Star Awards	Best Actress	The Journey: Tumultuous Times (as Zhang Min)	Nominated	
2015	Asian Television Awards	Best Actress in a Leading Role	Love is Love: Sunshine (as Janelle)	Nominated	
2015	PPCTV MediaCorp Awards	Dream idol	—N/a	Won	
2016	Star Awards	Top 10 Most Popular Female Artistes	—N/a	Won	
2017	Star Awards	Top 10 Most Popular Female Artistes	—N/a	Won	
2017	Asian Television Awards	Best Actress in a Leading Role	2589 Days Apart (as Wu Weiwei)	Nominated	
2018	Star Awards	Top 10 Most Popular Female Artistes	—N/a	Won	
2018	Star Awards	Best Programme Host	Going Miles, Spreading Smiles	Nominated	
2018	Star Awards	Best Theme Song	"小人物向前冲" (Life Less Ordinary's theme song)	Nominated	
2019	Star Awards	Top 10 Most Popular Female Artistes	—N/a	Won	
2021	Star Awards	Best Actress	A Jungle Survivor (as Olivia)	Nominated	
2021	Star Awards	Top 10 Most Popular Female Artistes	—N/a	Nominated	
2021	Asian Academy Creative Awards	Best Actress in a Leading Role	A Jungle Survivor (as Olivia)	Won	
2022	Star Awards	Top 10 Most Popular Female Artistes	—N/a	Won	
2023	Star Awards	All-Time Favourite Artiste	—N/a	Won	
2025	Star Awards	Best Actress	I Do, Do I? (as Yumi)	Nominated	
