= Switched! (Singaporean TV series) =

- 幸运星
- Genre: Modern Drama; Fantasy
- Directed by: Loo Yin Kam
- Starring: Fann Wong; Jeanette Aw
- Country of origin: Singapore
- Original language: Chinese
- No. of episodes: 20

Production
- Running time: approx. 45 minutes

Original release
- Network: MediaCorp
- Release: June 26 – July 23, 2007

Related
- The Greatest Love of All; Honour and Passion

Switched! (Simplified Chinese: 幸运星) is a Singaporean Chinese-language drama television series, starring Fann Wong and Jeanette Aw which was broadcast on Singapore's free-to-air channel, MediaCorp TV Channel 8 from June 26, 2007 to July 23, 2007. It is screened on every weekday night, 9pm. This series consists of 20 episodes.

== Cast ==
=== Main cast ===
Cast	Role
Fann Wong	Jiang Xin Yu
Jeanette Aw	Jiang Xin Hui
Terence Cao	Wang An Xiang
Shaun Chen	Qin Shi Xuan

=== Supporting cast ===
Cast	Role
Richard Low	Jiang Pei Xiang
Jin Yinji	Liu Yujuan
Zen Chong	Jiang Zhi Heng
Julian Hee	Chen Han Sheng
Elyn Chong	Jing Jing
Zhu Houren	Qin Fu Zhong
Lin Meijiao	Shi Xuan's mother
Tracy Tan	Fei Fei
Ye Shipin	Wu De
Jaime Teo	Monica
Candyce Toh	Anna
Tan Xin Yi	Young Xin Yu
Dennis	Young Shi Xuan

== Synopsis ==
Jiang Pei Xiang is a TCM practitioner who runs a clinic with his wife and assistant Wang An Xiang. The oldest child Xin Yu has a scar and suffers from an inferiority complex as a result. Hence she has been unable to find a boyfriend at age 28. Xin Hui is an actress and enjoys the high life and much attention from potential suitors but has yet to find her "true love". Zhi Heng is the youngest and as the only son, his father has higher expectations of him, which only causes friction between them.

One day a genie swaps Xin Yu and Xin Hui's souls. They must now learn to cope with the other's situation.

== Viewership ratings ==
Week	Episode	Date	Average Number of audience in 5 weekdays (Round off to nearest thousand)
Week 1	Episodes 1 to 4	26 June 2007 to 29 June 2007	554, 000
Week 2	Episodes 5 to 9	2 July 2007 to 6 July 2007	582,000
Week 3	Episodes 10 to 14	9 July 2007 to 13 July 2007	611, 000
Week 4	Episodes 15 to 19	16 July 2007 to 20 July 2007	636, 000
Week 5	Episode 20 (Last episode)	23 July 2007	717, 000
