= Star Awards for Most Popular Regional Artiste =

Singaporean media award (2014–2015)

Star Awards for Most Popular Regional Artiste Award
- Current: Star Awards 2015
- Awarded for: Most Popular Artist in MediaCorp in Regional Countries
- Country: Singapore
- Presented by: MediaCorp
- First award: 2014
- Final award: 2015
- Currently held by: (China) : Christopher Lee (Malaysia) : Jeanette Aw (Cambodia) : Jeanette Aw (Indonesia) : Jeanette Aw (2015)

The Star Awards for Most Popular Regional Artiste was an award presented annually at the Star Awards, a ceremony that was established in 1994.

The category was introduced in 2014. It was given in honour to the nominees were determined by a team of judges employed by MediaCorp; winners were selected by a majority vote from the public via online voting from regional countries.

Since its inception, the award was given to only 4 artistes. Jeanette Aw and Christopher Lee are the most recent and final winners in this category. Since the award was presented in 2014, Jeanette Aw remain as the only artiste to win in this category four times, surpassing Rui En, who have two wins. Joanne Peh, Jeanette Aw and Rui En have been nominated on 8 occasions, more than any other artistes. Joanne Peh holds the record for the most nominations without a win, with eight.

The award was discontinued from 2016 onwards.

== Winners and nominees ==
=== 2014 ===
Star Awards 2014 Winners and nominees:

Indonesia	China
Rui En; Chen Liping; Desmond Tan; Edwin Goh; Elvin Ng; Ian Fang; Jeanette Aw; Joanne Peh; Julie Tan; Kate Pang; Li Nanxing; Paige Chua; Pierre Png; Qi Yuwu; Rebecca Lim; Romeo Tan; Shaun Chen; Tay Ping Hui; Yvonne Lim; Zoe Tay	Yvonne Lim; Chen Hanwei; Chen Liping; Christopher Lee; Desmond Tan; Elvin Ng; Guo Liang; Jeanette Aw; Joanne Peh; Julie Tan; Li Nanxing; Priscelia Chan; Qi Yuwu; Rebecca Lim; Romeo Tan; Rui En; Tay Ping Hui; Xiang Yun; Zhang Zhenxuan; Zoe Tay
Malaysia	Cambodia
Rui En; Bryan Wong; Chen Hanwei; Chen Liping; Tong Bing Yu; Christopher Lee; Elvin Ng; Ian Fang; Jeanette Aw; Joanne Peh; Julie Tan; Li Nanxing; Pierre Png; Qi Yuwu; Rebecca Lim; Romeo Tan; Shaun Chen; Tay Ping Hui; Xu Bin; Zoe Tay	Jeanette Aw; Chen Hanwei; Christopher Lee; Cynthia Koh; Elvin Ng; Joanne Peh; Kate Pang; Li Nanxing; Pan Lingling; Pierre Png; Rui En; Shaun Chen; Tay Ping Hui; Terence Cao; Tracy Lee; Yao Wenlong; Yvonne Lim; Zhang Yaodong; Zheng Geping; Zoe Tay

=== 2015 ===
Star Awards 2015 Winners and nominees:

Indonesia	China
Jeanette Aw; Felicia Chin; Rebecca Lim; Rui En; Romeo Tan; Zhang Zhenxuan; Tay Ping Hui; Shaun Chen; Chen Liping; Pierre Png; Li Nanxing; Aloysius Pang; Joanne Peh; Zoe Tay; Julie Tan; Elvin Ng; Chew Chor Meng; Desmond Tan; Ya Hui; Bryan Wong	Christopher Lee; Xiang Yun; Julie Tan; Rui En; Romeo Tan; Pornsak; Joanne Peh; Yvonne Lim; Zoe Tay; Chen Hanwei; Rebecca Lim; Tay Ping Hui; Elvin Ng; Chen Liping; Pierre Png; Li Nanxing; Qi Yuwu; Zhang Zhenxuan
Malaysia	Cambodia
Jeanette Aw; Felicia Chin; Rui En; Romeo Tan; Shaun Chen; Chen Liping; Pierre Png; Li Nanxing; Pornsak; Joanne Peh; Li Nanxing; Qi Yuwu; Elvin Ng; Chen Hanwei; Bryan Wong; Lee Teng; Tong Bing Yu; Pan Lingling	Jeanette Aw; Felicia Chin; Rebecca Lim; Rui En; Romeo Tan; Paige Chua; Cynthia Koh; Rui En; Jeanette Aw; Romeo Tan; Joanne Peh; Yvonne Lim; Zoe Tay; Chen Hanwei; Rebecca Lim; Tay Ping Hui; Elvin Ng; Chen Liping; Pierre Png; Li Nanxing; Qi Yuwu; Shaun Chen

== Category Facts ==
Most wins

Number of wins	Artiste
4	Jeanette Aw
2	Rui En

Most nominations

Number of nominations	Artiste
8	Jeanette Aw; Rui En Joanne Peh
7	Rebecca Lim
6	Romeo Tan
4	Christopher Lee; Elvin Ng; Felicia Chin; Tay Ping Hui; Li Nanxing; Zoe Tay
3	Chen Liping; Yvonne Lim; Julie Tan; Shaun Chen; Chen Hanwei; Pierre Png; Qi Yuwu
2	Ian Fang; Desmond Tan
