= Heartlanders =

Production
- Executive producer: Jenny Lim

Heartlanders is an English language television drama telecast on MediaCorp TV Channel 5. Based on the encounters of two officers of the Singapore Police Force. The first season aired on 5 July 2002, and has since another three seasons have aired, with the last season being shown from 12 July 2005. There are no indications as yet if a fifth season will be produced.

While the show evoked comparisons with Triple Nine, telecast from 1995 to 1999, Heartlanders was distinctively the first Singaporean English television series to be based primarily on uniformed patrol officers. The show was set in the Singaporean heartlands and in a typical public housing setting, hence the name Heartlanders.

The show starred Vincent Ng and Aaron Aziz as the main casts. It was Ng's first foray into an English drama, and helped to expose the latter to the non-Malay television audience. Other cast members included Tracy Tan and Natalie Faye in Season 1, Corrine Adrienne in Seasons 1 and 2, Steph Song in Season 2, Julian Hee in Season 3 and 4, Priscelia Chan in Season 3 and 4, Desiree Siahaan in Season 3 and 4, and Shaun Chen in Season 4. News of Aaron's planned departure to break into the Malaysian entertainment scene in late 2003 threatened the show's main lineup, and producers banked on the suspense by having Aaron's character almost killed off early in Season 3. This show also featured future Star Search contestants Andie Chen who would later become the Star Search 2007 champion and Romeo Tan who is the finalist of the Star Search 2010.

== Cast ==
- Vincent Ng – Cpl Ricky Soh
- Aaron Aziz – Cpl Jamal Bin Salleh
- Tracy Tan – Sharon Choo
- Corrine Adrienne – ASP Angela Soh
- Steph Song – Rachel Kang
- Julian Hee – Cpl Darren Ho
- Priscelia Chan – Lisa Gan
- Desiree Ann Siahaanp – Cassie
- Natalie Faye – Choon Yuen
- Shaun Chen – James

== Episodes ==
=== Season 1 (Fridays, 8:30 p.m.) ===
- 1. (5 July 2002):
- 12. (27 September 2002):
- 13. (4 October 2002):

=== Season 2 (Tuesdays, 8:30 p.m.) ===
- 1. (4 March 2003):
- 13. (27 May 2003):

=== Season 3 (Tuesdays, 8:30 p.m.) ===
- 1. (30 March 2004):
- 13. (22 June 2004):

=== Season 4 (Tuesdays, 8 p.m.) ===
- 1. (12 July 2005):
- 2. (19 July 2005):
- 3. (26 July 2005):
- 4. (2 August 2005):
- 5. (9 August 2005): Girl Gang
- 6. (16 August 2005): The Girl who Bled
- 7. (23 August 2005): The Kill
- 8. (30 August 2005): Payback
- 9. (6 September 2005): Grown Ups Do It
- 10: (13 September 2006): Little Girl Lost
- 11: (20 September 2006): The Wrath of Chinese Women
- 12: (27 September 2006): Vengeance Part I
- 13: (3 October 2006): Vengeance Part II
- 1. (19 July 2005): Happiness is a Warm Gun
