= Rhythm of Life (TV series) =

- 变奏曲
- Genre: Modern Drama
- Written by: Phang Kai Yee (彭凯毅); Lim Gim Lan (林锦兰)
- Directed by: Chong Liung Man (张龙敏)
- Starring: Christopher Lee; Jeanette Aw; Jesseca Liu; Elvin Ng
- Opening theme: 空缺 by Wu Jiahui 伍家辉
- Ending theme: 虽然我愿意 by Wu Jiahui 伍家辉
- Country of origin: Singapore
- Original language: Chinese
- No. of episodes: 20

Production
- Producer: Yeo Saik Pin (杨锡彬)
- Running time: approx. 45 minutes per episode

Original release
- Network: MediaCorp TV Channel 8
- Release: 5 May – 30 May 2008

Rhythm of Life (Chinese: 变奏曲) is a Singaporean Chinese modern family drama which was telecasted on Singapore's free-to-air channel, MediaCorp Channel 8. It made its debut on 5 May 2008 and ended on 30 May 2008. This drama serial consists of 20 episodes, and was aired on every weekday night at 9:00 pm.

== Cast ==
=== Main cast ===
Cast	Role	Description	Episodes Appeared
Christopher Lee 李铭顺	Li Jun Jie	Liu Zhi Yuan's buddy; In love with Chen Xiao Rou; Liu Zhi Ling's love interest	1–20
Jeanette Aw 欧萱	Chen Xiao Rou	Liu Zhi Yuan, Li Jun Jie and Liu Zhi Ling's best friend; In love with Li Jun Jie; Liu Zhi Yuan's love interest; Married Liu Zhi Yuan in episode 20	1–20
Jesseca Liu 刘芷绚	Liu Zhi Ling	Liu Zhi Yuan's younger sister; In love with Li Jun Jie	1–20
Elvin Ng 黄俊雄	Liu Zhi Yuan	Li Jun Jie and Chen Xiao Rou's best friend; Liu Zhi Ling's elder brother; In love with Chen Xiao Rou; Married Chen Xiao Rou in episode 20	1–20

=== Supporting cast ===
- Dawn Yeoh 姚懿珊 as Wang Fei Fei
- Zen Chong 章缜翔 as Wang Tian Bao
- Julian Hee 许立桦 as Zhang Nan (Zhang Lang)
- Li Yinzhu 李茵珠 as Grandma
- Hong Peixing as Tian Bao's father
- Lin Meijiao 林梅娇 as Tian Bao's mother

== Synopsis ==
The story revolves around three friends: Li Junjie, an architect; Liu Zhiyuan, a policeman; and Wang Tianbao, a bookie.

Junjie (Christopher Lee) could not believe that his father actually hit his mother. Thus, she made up her mind to leave both her husband and son. Feeling lost, Junjie searched everywhere for his mother. However, she was gone forever. Stooping in the rain, he tried to hold back the fear and rage he felt inside. At this moment, a little hand holding a piece of bread reached out to him. Junjie lifted his eyes, and there standing before him was a little girl with a sweet smile, just like an angel. Her name is Zhiling (Jesseca Liu), who is 10 years old. Junjie's life would have been even more lonesome had he not known Zhiyuan (Elvin Ng), Zhiling and Tianbao (Zen Chong).

One day on a hill, Junjie, Zhiyuan and Tianbao shared about their ambition and dreams for the future. Being high in spirits, they swore to be sworn brothers and to share fortune and woes together. Unfortunately, the road ahead would not be as smooth sailing as they imagined. Despite Junjie and his father living together for so many years, they are still unable to break the communication barrier. Junjie cannot forgive his dad for driving his mother away. Zhiling tries to act as a mediator between them. However, he often takes her for granted. Tianbao was in love with Zhiling, but he knew that in order to be with her, he has to defeat his rival, Junjie. Unfortunately, he was never able to outshine Junjie. Fate played a cruel joke on Junjie and Zhiyuan. They both met and fell deeply in love with Xiaorou (Jeanette) at the same time. The two had to make a choice between friendship and love.

At this time, a brutal truth unravelled. Xiaorou caught up with her past relationship, could not delve into the future but often lived in the blissful memories of yesteryears. Zhiyuan was merely a replacement for Mingwen, her ex-boyfriend who had died. Even though Zhiyuan knew the truth, he was willing to be Mingwen's substitute. However, Xiaorou knows that only Junjie can release her from her past. The notorious Zhang Nan, nicknamed Cockroach, wants to change for the better after knowing the kind-hearted Zhiling. Unfortunately, Zhiling met with an accident and died.

Junjie had the opportunity to save Zhiling. However, he missed it when he went after Xiaorou who wanted to leave him. Choosing Xiaorou over Zhiling, he lost Zhiling instead. After Zhiling's death, Junjie, Zhiyuan, Tianbao and Xiaorou's lives underwent a tremendous change. After Zhiling's death, Junjie started to feel emptiness in his heart. Junjie feels that there is a barrier between Xiaorou and him. He began to engage routinely in activities that Zhiling used to do, hoping to relieve himself from his guilt. However, he is unsure of his feelings for Zhiling.

On the other hand, Xiaorou tries her best to let go of her previous entangling relationship. However, memories from the past still linger within her. She realizes that there is a distance between Junjie and her, and once again, he became another substitute for Mingwen. Humans keep repeating the same mistakes they make.

Besides facing difficulties in his career, Junjie found himself manipulated by a woman named, Zhishan. He made an erroneous decision and in order to cover his initial mistake, he committed one wrongdoing after another. In the end, he not only lost his father, but also his love ones and his friends. Junjie found his way back to the 'wishing well' pool where he used to frequent and make a wish. He wished, if he could start afresh, he would make right all his wrong decisions. Then, as if in a dream, he saw Zhiling and went after her.

Suddenly he lost his footing, fell into the water, and was dragged to the bottom of the pool by a mysterious force. When he regained conscious, he found himself back in time at the scene just before Zhiling died.

== Viewership rating and reception ==
Week	Episode	Date	Percentage of Population (%)
Week 1	Ep 1 to Ep 5	5 May 2008 to 9 May 2008	15.4%
Week 2	Ep 6 to Ep 10	12 May 2008 to 16 May 2008	14.6%
Week 3	Ep 11 to Ep 15	19 May 2008 to 23 May 2008	15.0%
Week 4	Ep 16 to Ep 20	26 May 2008 to 30 May 2008	16.3%
