= Spice Siblings =

Spice Siblings (辣兄辣妹) is a Chinese show in Singapore, aired in 2004 starring Tay Ping Hui, Jeanette Aw, Cynthia Koh, Andrew Seow and Le Yao. This show is also very well known to the MediaCorp TV Channel 8 viewer's community as the show with the "hot kiss" by Tay Ping Hui and Jeanette Aw. This series repeated on Tue - Sat at 12am, succeeding Hainan Kopi Tales.

== Plot ==
The show is about a family of five who runs a laksa stall in Katong, Singapore.

== Cast ==
- Ye Shipin as Zhong Wen Shui
- Tay Ping Hui as Zhong Wen He, a man who returns to Singapore with his daughter after spending some years in America, having contracted bone cancer.
- Jeanette Aw as Zhong Wen Qing
- Le Yao as Zhong Wen Xin
- Andrew Seow as Zhong Wen Quan
- Cynthia Koh as Ding Zhenzhu
- Teo Ser Li as Anqi, Wen He's ex-wife
