= The Defining Moment (TV series) =

- 沸腾冰点
- Starring: Fann Wong; Pierre Png; Jeanette Aw; Andie Chen; Xiang Yun; Zhu Houren; Darren Lim; Ng Hui
- Country of origin: Singapore
- Original language: Chinese
- No. of episodes: 20

Production
- Running time: approx. 45 minutes

Original release
- Network: MediaCorp TV Channel 8
- Release: 4 August 2008

The Defining Moment (沸腾冰点) is a Singaporean drama which aired on Channel 8, debuted on 4 August 2008, and consists of 20 episodes.

== Cast ==
- Fann Wong as Lin Kexin:
  Rui En was originally cast as Lin Kexin but Rui En rejected the role due to intimate scenes. The role then went to Fann.
- Jeanette Aw as Lin Keyi
- Andie Chen as Lin Kexi
- Zhu Houren as Tang Weiye
- Pierre Png
- Thomas Ng
- Xiang Yun
- Darren Lim
- Ng Hui

== Accolades ==
Year	Award	Category	Nominee	Result	Ref
2009	Star Awards	Best Actress	Fann Wong	Nominated	
2009	Star Awards	Best Supporting Actor	Zhu Houren	Nominated	
2009	Star Awards	Top 10 Highest Viewership Local Dramas in 2008 Award 十大最高收视率	—N/a	Won Highly Commended	
