= Star Awards 2006 =

Singaporean television awards

Star Awards 2006 红星大奖2006
- Date: 10 December 2006
- Location: St James Power Station
- Country: Singapore
- Hosted by: Guo Liang (Ceremony); Patty Hou (Ceremony); Dasmond Koh (Prelude and Post-show); Christina Lin (Prelude only)

Highlights
- Most awards: Drama: The Shining Star (3); Variety/Info-ed: Home Decor Survivor (2)
- Most nominations: Drama: The Shining Star (7); Variety/Info-ed: Home Decor Survivor; Property Classified (2 each)
- Best Drama: The Shining Star
- Best Variety Show: Home Decor Survivor
- Best Actor: Li Nanxing
- Best Actress: Ivy Lee
- All-time Favourite Artiste: Chen Liping

Television/radio coverage
- Network: MediaCorp Channel 8 MediaCorp Channel U (Post-show)
- Runtime: 180 mins (both presentations); 60 mins (Post-show); 30 mins (Prelude)

Star Awards 2006 is a television awards ceremony telecast in 2006 as part of the annual Star Awards organised by MediaCorp for MediaCorp TV Channel 8. The ceremony, alongside the Walk-of-fame and the Post-show party, were held on 10 December 2006 in Singapore and was hosted by Guo Liang and Taiwanese host Patty Hou.

This year saw precedents in Star Awards history: it was the second ceremony in Star Awards history that the ceremony was held outside the Caldecott Hill since the 1996 ceremony, where it was instead held on a pub at St James Power Station (a pub near VivoCity); it was also the first Star Awards ceremony (of the only seven) to be awarded the Best Variety Special in 2007.

== Winners and nominees ==
Unless otherwise stated, winners are listed first, highlighted in boldface.

=== Backstage achievement awards ceremony ===
As like preceding ceremonies, professional and technical awards were presented before the main ceremony via a clip montage due to time constraints. The lists of winners are only reflected in the table.

**Best Director 最佳导演**: **Chong Liung Man 张龙敏 – C.I.D.**	**Best Screenplay 最佳剧本**: **Ang Eng Tee 洪荣狄 – The Shining Star**; **Ng Kah Huay 黄佳华 and Goh Chwee Chwee 吴翠翠 – Family Matters 法庭俏佳人**
**Best Variety Set Design 最佳综艺布景设计**: **Ahyak Yahya – SuperBand 非常SuperBand**	**Best Variety Clothing Design 最佳综艺服装设计**: **Annie Chua Yi Jun 蔡宜君 – Ren Ci Charity Show 2006 仁心慈爱照万千2006**
**Best Opening Title 最佳开场设计**: **Jon Li 李尊 – Campus SuperStar 校园SuperStar 2006**	**Best Promotional Video 最佳宣传短片**: **Lim Swee Shia 林瑞霞 – Its Showtime! 全民创意争霸赛**
**Best Variety Research Writer 最佳综艺资料撰稿**: **Kerry Soh 苏丽䣐 – Campus SuperStar (Grand Finals)**	**Best Promotional Video 最佳宣传短片**: **Teo Kim Kee 张琴棋 – Never Say Die (Finals) 永不言败 大决赛**
**Best News Story 最佳新闻报道**: **Ng Kee Haur 黄志豪 – CNY Temple Visits 农历新年与庙会**
**Best Current Affairs Story 最佳时事报道**: **Focus 焦点 – Gao Xingjian Experience in Paris 高行健巴黎接触**

=== Main ceremony ===
**Best Drama Serial 最佳电视剧**: **The Shining Star**; C.I.D.; Love at 0 °C; Measure of Man; Rhapsody In Blue	**Best Variety Programme 最佳综艺节目**: **Home Decor Survivor 摆家乐**; Dollar and Sense 神机妙算; My Star Guide 我的导游是明星; Property Classified 吉屋出售; Where the Queue Starts 排排站, 查查看
**Best Variety Special 最佳综艺特备节目**: **Ren Ci Charity Show 2006 仁心慈爱照万千2006**; Campus SuperStar (Grand Final); Its Showtime! (Grand Final) 全民创意争霸赛 大决赛; SuperBand (Grand Final); Star Idol (Grand Final) 明星偶像 大决赛	**Best Info-Ed Programme 最佳资讯节目**: **Y Do You Care! 惊叹号！**; Art Of War 孙子智慧; Of Rites And Rituals 我们的大日子; TR Report: Good Man Good Deed 2 特写：好人好事2; TR Report: Heirloom Recipe V 特写：家传菜5 - 异国风味
**Best Actor 最佳男主角**: **Li Nanxing – The Undisclosed**; Adrian Pang – Portrait of Home 2; Pierre Png – The Shining Star; Qi Yuwu – C.I.D.; Tay Ping Hui – C.I.D.	**Best Actress 最佳女主角**: **Ivy Lee – Family Matters**; Jesseca Liu – Rhapsody in Blue; Ann Kok – Love Concierge 爱的掌门人; Fann Wong – Women of Times; Jacelyn Tay – Love Concierge 爱的掌门人
**Best Supporting Actor 最佳男配角**: **Huang Yiliang – Women of Times**; Adam Chen – The Shining Star; Shaun Chen – C.I.D.; Rayson Tan – The Undisclosed; Zheng Geping – The Shining Star	**Best Supporting Actress 最佳女配角**: **Hong Huifang – The Shining Star**; Felicia Chin – Women of Times; Lin Meijiao – Family Matters; Constance Song 宋怡霏 – C.I.D.; Xiang Yun 向云 – Love at 0 °C
**Best Variety Show Host 最佳综艺主持人**: **Bryan Wong 王禄江 – Home Decor Survivor 摆家乐**; Mark Lee – Property Classified 吉屋出售; Kym Ng – Love Bites 缘来就是你; Quan Yi Fong – What's Art? 什么艺思?; Ben Yeo – It's Showtime! 全民创意争霸赛	**Best News / Current Affairs Presenter 最佳新闻播报/时事主持人**: **Tung Soo Hua**; Lin Chi Yuan 林启元; Serene Loo 吕诗琳; Ng Siew Leng 黄秀玲; Zhao Wenbei
**Young Talent Award 青苹果奖**: **Boon Hui Lu – Rhapsody in Blue**; Kyle Chan Xing Yu 陈星余 – Love at 0 °C; Jarren Ho Jin Yang 何俊扬 – A Promise For Tomorrow; Ong Zoei 王楚仪 – A Promise For Tomorrow; Rachell Ng Ting Yi 黄莛贻 – The Shining Star	**Best Theme Song 最佳主题曲**: **Kelvin Tan – The Shining Star – 触摸**; Cai Mei Yi 蔡美仪 – Family Matters – 信任; Shi Xin Hui – The Rainbow Connection – 舞出彩虹; Joi Chua – Rhapsody in Blue – 风铃; Mayday – A Promise For Tomorrow – 知足

=== Special award ===
==== All Time Favourite Award ====
This award is a special achievement award given out to artiste(s) who have achieved a maximum of 10 popularity awards over 10 years. The award will not be presented in 2007, as there are no recipients with ten Top 10 Most Popular Male or Female Artistes award wins to allow the award to be presented that year.

**All Time Favourite Artiste** **超级红星**	**Chen Liping 陈莉萍**	1994 | 1995 | 1996 | 1997 | 1998 | 1999 | 2000 | 2002 | 2004 | 2005

==== Viewership awards ====
**Top 10 Highest Viewership Dramas Award 十大最高收视率电视剧**
1. Love Concierge 爱的掌门人
2. Measure of Man
3. A Million Treasures
4. Women of Times
5. Love at 0 °C
6. C.I.D.
7. An Enchanted Life
8. The Shining Star
9. The Undisclosed
10. House of Joy
**Top Rated Variety Program 最高收视率综艺节目**
- **Star Idol**

== Popularity awards ==
=== Awards eligible for voting ===
**Most Popular Newcomer Award 最受欢迎新人**
- **Kelvin Tan 陈伟联**
  - Chew Sin Huey 石欣卉
  - Elvin Ng 黄俊雄
  - Candyce Toh 杜慧萍
  - Dawn Yeoh 姚懿珊

=== Top 10 Most Popular Artistes ===
**Bold**	Top 10 winners
n	Recipient's accumulated number of awards
	Made it to top 10 in the week / Fall under the Top n category.
**10**	Recipient won his/her tenth Top 10 award and would be awarded the "All-time Favourite Artiste" on the following year's ceremony.

**Top 10 Most Popular Male Artistes**
Artistes	Top 18	Top 16	Top 14	Top 12	Top 10
Dasmond Koh					
Julian Hee					
**Kelvin Tan**					1
**Gurmit Singh**					4
**Edmund Chen**					6
Terence Cao					
Huang Wenyong					
Adrian Pang					
Guo Liang					
**Mark Lee**					8
**Elvin Ng**					1
**Vincent Ng**					5
Chen Shucheng					
Dennis Chew					
**Qi Yuwu**					3
**Christopher Lee**					8
**Bryan Wong**					4
**Tay Ping Hui**					6
Chen Hanwei					
Marcus Chin					

**Top 10 Most Popular Female Artistes**
Artistes	Top 18	Top 16	Top 14	Top 12	Top 10
Pan Lingling					
Joanne Peh					
**Fiona Xie**					2
**Kym Ng**					3
**Xiang Yun**					7
**Rui En**					2
Patricia Mok					
Bukoh Mary 巫许玛莉					
Priscelia Chan					
**Quan Yi Fong**					2
Yvonne Lim					
Jacelyn Tay					
**Jesseca Liu**					1
**Huang Biren**					9
Michelle Chong					
**Michelle Chia**					3
**Jeanette Aw**					4
Ivy Lee					
Chew Sin Huey					
**Felicia Chin**					1

== Presenters and performers ==
The following individuals presented awards or performed musical numbers.

Artistes / Special guests	Presented / Performed
Angie Chiu; Francis Ng	Presented Best Drama Serial
Judges of Project SuperStar: Billy Koh 许环良; Lee Wei Song 李伟菘; Li Feihui; Anthony Png 方钟桦; Dawn Yip 叶佩芬	Presented Best Variety Show
Anthony Bao 包小松; Tino Bao 包小柏	Presented Best Variety Special
Dylan Kuo; Joe "Joseph" Cheng	Presented Best Supporting Actress and Best Supporting Actor
CEO, MediaCorp; Lucas Chow 周永强	Gave out All-Star Favourite Artiste
Mavis Hee	Presented Best Newcomer
KPMG Singapore associate 李诗莹	Gave presenter result list
Hee Theng Fong 许廷芳	Presented Best News / Current Affairs Presenter
Chi-Chien Kuo 郭子乾; Tai Chih-yuan	Presented comedic skit and Best Variety Show Host
Kong Jiu 九孔	Performed "天上人间" (as Fei Yu-ching 费玉清), "心太软" (as Richie Jen 任贤齐) and "不变的心" (as Fei) as entrance performance during comedic skit
Francis Ng 吴镇宇	Presented Best Actress
Angie Chiu; Melvin Wong 黃錦燊	Presented Best Actor
Tony Sun; Zax Wang 王仁甫 (from 5566)	Presented Top 10 Most Popular Female Artistes
Nick Cheung; Jessica Hsuan	Presented Top 10 Most Popular Male Artistes

== Television spinoff ==
An eight-week half-hour series, titled Star Awards Up-close premiered on Tuesdays 8:30 pm from 17 October until 5 December, focusing on the award show leading up to the actual show on 10 December, along with presentation of 'side awards' (not an actual award). The weekly popularity results for the Top 10 Most Popular Artistes were announced as well. The series was hosted by Dasmond Koh and Christina Lin.

== Ceremony ==
Professional and Technical Awards were presented before the main ceremony via a clip montage due to time constraints. The main awards were presented during the ceremony.

=== Criticism ===
The ceremony for Star Awards 2006 received mixed reception, however, criticisms were surfaced from the technical, camera and backstage crew, ranging from technical problems (i.e. lack of sound control, or display glitches) to management (i.e. time management and area allocation, the latter did receive complaints from the audiences watching from the mosh pit and free standing areas).

St. James Power Station, which was selected as the venue, was also criticised by viewers, citing that the venue was too small to host award ceremonies as artistes and audience were either squeezed in or forced out of the venue due to limited space. However, four other venues outside the MediaCorp Studios at Caldecott studios (1996's World Trade Centre, 2010–11's Resorts World Sentosa, 2012–13's Marina Bay Sands and 2014's Suntec Singapore Convention and Exhibition Centre) were much more favourable in hosting live performances since, specifically Star Awards.

The nominations also saw controversies whereas the potential artistes, notably Aileen Tan, who had two leading roles, failed to receive nominations for both Best Actresses and the Top 10 Most Favourite artiste, in the place for singers Kelvin Tan, Candyce Toh and Chew Sin Huey, all of which were nominated for the first time. This led to outrage by Tan's detractors, who claimed that she has taken on stereotype roles, particular that of fierce, angry and constantly screaming characters too many times, which could have impacted her nomination chances.

During the award ceremony, both the acceptance speeches for Tay Ping Hui (Tay unnecessarily extended for an extended duration, causing host Bryan Wong was unable to finish his speech on time) and Huang Yiliang (Huang making remarks unsuitable for audiences) had resulted in complaints lodged by the viewers. The guest presenters were also heavily criticised in terms on jokes, leading MediaCorp to force out fans from entering the pub.

The adjustment of the ratio for the "Top 10 Most Favourite Artistes" received mixed reviews about the 50% allocation of the final results, which was done in August 2006 by a survey of about 600 Singaporeans. The reviews ranging from advantages assumed by newer artistes, but also a bit of criticism when rumours were spread on why Kelvin Tan Wei Lian lost by some votes in the weekly survey results. Despite this, the 50% allocation would later be returned in Star Awards 2018, and revised where it was done on a derivation of 1,000 votes.

== Awards ==
Year	Award	Category	Nominated work	Result	Ref
2007	Star Awards	Best Entertainment Special Programme	—N/a	Won	
