= The Dream Makers (Singaporean season 2) =

- Also known as: The Dream Makers 2
- 志在四方 II
- Genre: Drama; Media Industry; Romance; Office Politics
- Written by: Rebecca Leow
- Directed by: Loh Woon Woon; Wong Foong Hwee; Doreen Yap
- Starring: Li Nanxing; Zoe Tay; Huang Biren; Jeanette Aw; Rui En; Qi Yuwu; Romeo Tan; Julie Tan; Zhang Zhenhuan; Chen Meifeng; Damian Lau
- Opening theme: 终于 by Kit Chan
- Ending theme: 當世界只剩下我一個人 by Serene Koong 学者愛 by Eric Chou 狠狠愛 by Wu Jiahui
- Country of origin: Singapore
- Original language: Chinese
- No. of episodes: 32 (list of episodes)

Production
- Executive producers: Paul Yuen; Wong Foong Hwee
- Production locations: Singapore; Australia
- Running time: approx. 45 minutes (excluding advertisements)

Original release
- Network: Mediacorp Channel 8
- Release: 4 December 2015 – 18 January 2016

Related
- The Dream Makers (2013)

The Dream Makers II (Chinese: 志在四方II, often abbreviated as ZZSF2) is a 32-episode Singaporean drama produced and telecast on Mediacorp Channel 8. It stars Li Nanxing, Zoe Tay, Huang Biren, Jeanette Aw, Rui En, Qi Yuwu, Romeo Tan, Julie Tan, Zhang Zhenhuan, Chen Meifeng & Damian Lau as the casts for the second series.

The series finale end credits include a special tribute to MediaCorp actor, Huang Wenyong, who died in 2013, and all those who contributed assiduously to the country's TV industry.

== Plot ==
The show starts three years after Zhou Weiyun (Zoe Tay) was transferred from the Variety department to the Drama department as Vice President. Since the death of Yu Fan (Chen Hanwei), Weiyun's outlook on life had changed. She becomes more cheerful and personable in her dealings with others. She lives with her mother, who has dementia and focuses on her career to produce sentimental television programs. The rising popularity of internet content has caused the ratings for traditional television shows to fall, adversely affecting advertising revenue.

Her bosses decide to hire Guan Xie En (Huang Biren) as a second Vice President to create healthy competition within the department. She is a business management genius and takes over half of Weiyun's production resources, splitting the department into two teams. Although initially in charge of the 7pm primetime slot, Xie En reels enough sponsors to take over Weiyun's primetime slot of 9pm. Some of Weiyun's subordinates attempt to betray her to join Xie En's team but fail.

Meanwhile, Lin Tao (Li Nanxing) takes over the helms of the variety department. His creative and innovative input lead to soaring ratings for variety shows. His eager for success is motivated by a personal vendetta against his good friend Richard, who owns a competing drama production house. Richard previously absconded with his money and even stole his girlfriend.

For years, Lin Tao has been watching over Eddy (Edwin Goh), a former teenage thief who became his godson. Lin Tao soon finds out that Eddy is the son of Xie En, who divorced his father and gave up custody of him and his younger brother Eden (Damien Teo). Eden is led to believe his mother is dead. After their father dies, the brothers go to live with Xie En, who tries to mend her relationship with her estranged sons.

Joey (Ian Fang), Weiyun's cocky nephew joins the entertainment industry. Weiyun reprimands him frequently, straining their relationship. Joey's parents die in a freak accident while on a Greek holiday sponsored by Weiyun. Overwhelmed by the sudden loss of his family, Joey's antics turn for the extreme. Feeling guilty for causing his parents' death, Weiyun tries to make it up to Joey. The struggles that both Weiyun and Xie En face help develop a mutual understanding between them.

Fang Tonglin (Rui En) is excellent in both hosting and acting, pressuring the reigning queen of the station, Zhao Fei Er (Jeanette Aw). Meanwhile, Tonglin and Jason Lam's (Qi Yu Wu) relationship stabilize with marriage on the cards. Jason has been promoted to executive producer, but his artistic vision leads to clashes with the company's more commercial approach to production. Fei Er still has not gotten over him, secretly envying Tonglin. She is paired as an onscreen couple with Zhong Yiming (Romeo Tan), a new actor who found success in major Chinese-speaking markets, but loathes his narcissistic personality. Eventually, their tension blossoms into romance.

A filming accident with Jason and Joey injures a passerby on set. Joey pushes the blame to Jason, who eventually quits. He starts a career as a hawker, leading to various arguments with Tonglin, whose popularity has risen.

A new television station is also awarded a broadcasting license, introducing added competition to the industry, and Lin Tao is poached to run the company's productions. Lin Tao recruits VBS's best talents to follow him, but is horrified to find out Richard will be his superior in the new company. The fighting and rivalry leaves Weiyun bitter and disillusioned, and she considers leaving the entertainment industry.

== Cast ==
- Li Nanxing as Lin Tao 林韬
- Zoe Tay as Zhou Weiyun 周薇芸
- Huang Biren as Guan Xie En 官谢恩
- Jeanette Aw as Zhao Fei Er 赵非儿
- Rui En as Fang Tonglin 方彤琳
- Qi Yuwu as Jason Lam 蓝钦辉
- Romeo Tan as Zhong Yiming 钟一鸣
- Julie Tan as Dong Zihuai 董子怀
- Zhang Zhenhuan as Chen Guang 陈光
- Ian Fang as Joey Zhou Yaozu 周耀祖
- Damian Lau as Zheng Shouyi 郑守义
- Li Wenhai as MD Chong
- Wang Yuqing as Qin Wenxu 秦文旭
- Dennis Chew as Fang Yuanren 方元仁
- Choy Peng Hoy as Yalian 亚莲
- Richard Low as Zhao De 赵德
- Edwin Goh as Eddy Xu
- Damien Teo as Eden Xu Wenkai 许文凯
- Chen Meifeng as Zhong Qianyi 钟倩怡
- Rayson Tan as Richard Ma
- Zhai Siming

== Development and production ==
The first season concluded with overwhelming success: high viewership ratings on television and video streaming portals, huge turnout for its on-ground events, and won 9 out of 21 nominations in Star Awards 20. Towards the end of 2014, MediaCorp announced a sequel to the series. As the series will coincide with MediaCorp's big move from Caldecott Hill to Mediapolis@one-north, MediaCorp shared plans to promote the show, including a mega-bulk publicity plan on major television, radio, and interactive media channels, and a charity gala premiere to increase sponsors' advertising profits.

The cast of the series had imaging sessions for the show in May. Jeanette Aw's wardrobe was expanded by the production team to match her role's elevated career status. Julie Tan revealed that she began her preparation work for her role by watching Japanese dramas and practicing her expressions while looking into a mirror, and also made a trip to Taipei for five days to observe the behaviour of 'taimei's there.

Filming commenced on 10 June 2015, and held its lensing ceremony on 19 June. Taiwanese actress Chen Meifeng appeared in the lensing ceremony during her 5-to-6-day stint, dismissing rumours that she is in a relationship with Li Nanxing. It was also revealed that the show will end on 15 January 2016 with 32 episodes. Additional promotional photography was held on 29 June, involving the main cast. In addition, Zoe Tay and Aw went to China International Film & TV Programs Exhibition (CIFTPE) in Beijing to promote the show. The bridal magazine sequence was shot on 24 July at the Peranakan Museum, with Aw, Romeo Tan, Rui En and Qi Yuwu.

Damian Lau went to Singapore in September for the show. One of his scenes involves a flashback with him attempting suicide from a 13-storey HDB flat. Because the haze had hit unhealthy ranges, Lau was under the weather and declined all media interviews, but felt much better at the time Toggle interviewed him. During the filming, Li, dressed in his 1990s style haircut in the scene, brought in herbal tea for him, while Tay offered local cakes and snacks.

The production crew and cast (Tay, Li, Qi, Aw, Rui En and Romeo Tan), together with the Toggle reporting crew, head to Melbourne on 25 September for around 10 days of filming. Toggle made live reports throughout their stint. The cast also provided their experiences while filming for the show on Thursdays, beginning from 15 October. Filming wrapped up in October 2015.

== Soundtrack ==
Kit Chan, who previously performed theme songs for My Home Affairs and Devotion, recorded the show's theme song, "Finally" (《终于》). Serene Koong, who performed the theme song for the first season, recorded one of the sub-theme songs for the series, "All Alone" (《当世界只剩下我一个人》). She revealed that her eyes became swollen from crying after binge-watching the first season twice, and eventually composed the lyrics of the song in half a day. Other sub-theme songs include "Happiness is Not Difficult", the first season's theme song also sung by Koong, "Learn to Love" By Eric Chou and "Hate-Love", an acoustic version of "Finally" with different lyrics.

Song title	Song type	Performer	Composer(s)	Lyricist(s)	Song Arranger(s)	Producer(s)	Provided by
终于 (Finally)	Theme Song	Kit Chan 陈洁仪	Wu Jiahui 伍家辉	Cheryl Lee 李欣怡	Terence Teo	柯贵民	Banshee Empire
当世界只剩下我一个人 (All Alone)	Sub-theme Song 1	Serene Koong 龚芝怡	Serene Koong 龚芝怡		Kenn C	Serene Koong	GoodGirlMusic
幸福不难 (Happiness Is Not difficult )	Sub-theme Song 2	Serene Koong 龚芝怡	Serene Koong 龚芝怡		—N/a	Serene Koong	GoodGirlMusic
学者爱 (Learn to Love)	Sub-theme Song 3	Eric Chou 周兴哲	Eric Chou	Eric Chou; Wu I-Wei	—N/a		Sony Music
狠狠爱 (Hate-Love)	Sub-theme Song 4	Wu Jiahui 伍家辉	Wu Jiahui		Wu Jiahui	—N/a	Small Box Music

== Release ==
An autograph session for the series was on 7 November 2015, at Square 2, hosted by YES 933 DJ Kenneth Chung Kun Wah. Zoe Tay, Romeo Tan, Zhang Zhenhuan and Ian Fang were present at the event, and interacted with the audience. The first 150 audience to form the queue for the event will get to receive an autographed poster and a goodie bag each. A meet-and-greet session was held on 15 November at Junction 10, where Dennis Chew joined the above-mentioned cast. Similarly, the first 150 audience to form the queue for the event will get to receive a limited-edition tumbler and a goodie bag each.

A press conference was held on 18 November 2015. Zoe Tay, Huang Biren, Jeanette Aw, Rui En, Qi Yuwu, Romeo Tan, Julie Tan, Zhang, Fang and Chew attended the conference. During the conference, the cast shared their experience in making the show.

Previously planned as a charity gala premiere, Mediacorp announced a charity gala finale at its new premises at Mediapolis@one-north which was held on 16 January 2016. Besides Zoe Tay, Huang Biren, Romeo Tan, Julie Tan, Zhang Zhenhuan and Ian Fang, supporting cast Joey Feng, Damien Teo and Maxi Lim also attended the finale. This event was hosted by DJs Chung Kun Wah and Lin Lingzhi. The event began at 7.00pm, but before that, a red carpet was held for the event at 5.30pm, where eight lucky winners from a Facebook contest got a hair and face makeover, and strutted down the red carpet along with the cast. The lucky winners also got a pair of tickets and pre-show cocktail party, for both the winner and an accompanying partner.

Apart from an entertaining showbiz talk, audience also got to take part in a charity auction, where items featured in the show, including Zhou Weiyun and Guan Xie En's identical dresses, lanyards, Fei Er's merchandise and Jason and Tonglin's wedding merchandise were put up on sale. Minimum bids began from $25 each of the lanyards and the glass shoe to $200 for each of the dresses. The highest bidder went to Chen Guang's lanyard and bear, where she was invited to the finale to collect these items on stage. The finale episode was then screened to round up the day's event. Over $20,000 went to Mediacorp Cares beneficiaries, from tickets sales, auction sales and sponsor donations.

=== Social media ===
Online popularity contests involving cast members were held on Facebook and Instagram, which began on 11 October. Each week, users can support the casts' posts according to the challenge by liking them. The cast with the highest total likes on their posts will win for that week.

Two "Battle of the Queens" and three "Battle of the Dukes" challenges have been organized on social media.

==== Results ====
- Battle of the Queens - Huang Biren (2) VS Zoe Tay (0)
- Battle of the Dukes - Ian Fang (3) VS Romeo Tan (0) VS Zhang Zhenhuan (0)

Online exclusives were also released on Toggle and MediaCorp Channel 8's YouTube channel. Titled "The Gossip Makers" (8卦四方), these videos attempt to poke fun of the Singaporean entertainment scene, and gets audiences ready for the return of The Dream Makers.

=== Home media ===
The Dream Makers 2 DVD has been released in Poh Kim Video stores.

== Accolades ==
The series was notable for marking four distinctions in the history for any Drama Serial in a Star Awards ceremony: the series broke the number of nominations in the 2016 at 26 (surpassing the series' first season's 21); the series broke the most wins in an award ceremony at 12 (surpassing both the first season and The Little Nyonya, both with nine); the series became the first show to sweep every winning category (with the exception for two, "Top Rated Drama Series" and "Favourite Male Character", the latter of which the show was not nominated for), and lastly, the second drama (after Holland V in 2003) to sweep every of the four major acting categories.

Organisation	Year	Category	Nominees	Result	Ref.
Asian Television Awards	2016	Best Supporting Actor in a Leading Role	Zhang Zhen Huan	Nominated	
Asian Television Awards	2016	Best Supporting Actress in a Leading Role	Julie Tan	Nominated	
Asian Television Awards	2016	Best Drama Serial	The Dream Makers II	Nominated	
Star Awards	2016	Best Director	Loh Woon Woon	Won	
Star Awards	2016	Best Director	Wong Foong Hwee	Nominated	
Star Awards	2016	Best Screenplay	Rebecca Leow	Nominated	
Star Awards	2016	Best Programme Promo	Kee Chee Wee	Nominated	
Star Awards	2016	Best Cameraman for Drama Programme	Tommy Lee Heng Soon	Nominated	
Star Awards	2016	Best Editing For Drama Programme	Simon Poon	Won	
Star Awards	2016	Best Editing For Drama Programme	Joyce Teo	Nominated	
Star Awards	2016	Best Editing For Drama Programme	Steven Lee	Nominated	
Star Awards	2016	Rocket Award	Julie Tan	Won	
Star Awards	2016	Young Talent Award	Damien Teo	Won	
Star Awards	2016	Best Theme Song	"终于" by Kit Chan	Won	
Star Awards	2016	Best Supporting Actor	Edwin Goh	Nominated	
Star Awards	2016	Best Supporting Actor	Zhang Zhenhuan	Won	
Star Awards	2016	Best Supporting Actress	Julie Tan	Won	
Star Awards	2016	Best Actor	Romeo Tan	Nominated	
Star Awards	2016	Best Actor	Qi Yuwu	Won	
Star Awards	2016	Best Actress	Jeanette Aw	Won	
Star Awards	2016	Best Actress	Rui En	Nominated	
Star Awards	2016	Best Actress	Zoe Tay	Nominated	
Star Awards	2016	Best Drama Serial	The Dream Makers II	Won	
Star Awards	2016	Favourite Female Character	Jeanette Aw	Won	
Star Awards	2016	Favourite Female Character	Rui En	Nominated	
Star Awards	2016	Favourite Female Character	Huang Biren	Nominated	
Star Awards	2016	Favourite Onscreen Couple (Drama)	Qi Yuwu and Rui En	Nominated	
Star Awards	2016	Favourite Onscreen Couple (Drama)	Qi Yuwu and Jeanette Aw	Won	
Star Awards	2016	Favourite Onscreen Couple (Drama)	Zhang Zhenhuan and Julie Tan	Nominated	
Star Awards	2016	London Choco Roll	Romeo Tan	Won	
Star Awards	2016	Bioskin Flawless Skin Award	Julie Tan	Nominated	
Fame Awards 2016	2016	Best Actor in a Leading Role	Qi Yuwu	Nominated	
Fame Awards 2016	2016	Best Actor in a Supporting Role	Edwin Goh	Nominated	
