= Julian Hee =

Singaporean actor

- Born: 11 June 1978 (age 48); Singapore
- Occupations: Actor; television host; model
- Years active: 2001 – present

Chinese name
- Simplified Chinese: 许立桦
Transcriptions
Standard Mandarin
- Hanyu Pinyin: Xǔ Lìhuá

Julian Hee (Chinese: 许立桦; pinyin: Xǔ Lìhuá; born 11 June 1978) is a Singaporean former actor and model. He was prominently a full-time Mediacorp artiste from 2001 to 2014.

== Career ==
=== Modeling ===
Before entering the entertainment industry, Julian was a model. He won Mr. Manhunt Singapore in 2002 and represented Singapore in Manhunt International 2002, which was held in Shanghai. He was a semi-finalist in Mister World 2003.

=== Acting ===
Hee is a full-time actor, formerly signed by MediaCorp, and has performed in both English and Chinese dramas. He made his television debut on the Channel 5 show Heartlanders (seasons 3 and 4) before switching to Channel 8 Chinese-language dramas. He was nominated for the Best Newcomer in the 2005 Star Awards and the Top 10 Most Popular Male Artistes the following year.

Hee's last drama while at MediaCorp was the PerfectCut. After leaving in 2009, he became a freelance actor, starring in dramas like Gifted .

== Personal life ==
In 2017, Hee was assaulted and injured by a fellow motorist following a conflict at the Old Airport Road Hawker Centre.

In 2018, Hee was featured in a photoshoot by Dear Straight People called #Reasons4Repeal in support of the repeal of Section 377A.

== Filmography ==
=== Films/Movies ===
Year	Work	Role	Notes
2014	Rubbers	Thor	

=== Television ===
Year	Work	Role	Notes
2018	Gifted 天之骄子	Zhao Zijian/Jiang Wencong 赵子建/江文聪	Mediacorp Malaysia co production
2011	C.L.I.F. 警徽天职	Cheng Chee Hong 郑志鸿	
2010	Friends Forever 我爱麻糍	Lung 林志龙	Singapore-Malaysia co-production
2009	Perfect Cut II 一切完美2	Sky Tan	Channel U production
2009	Red Thread	Justin Kong	Channel 5 production
2008	Calefare	Manly Han	Channel 5 production Guest appearance
2008	Perfect Cut 一切完美	Sky Tan	Channel U production
2008	Rhythm of Life 变奏曲	Zhang Nan 张南	
2007	Metamorphosis 破茧而出	Leo Meng Tianbao	
2007	Switched 幸运星	Chen Hansheng 陈汉生	
2006	Love at 0°C 爱情零度C	Hu Guobin 胡国彬	
2006	Women of Times 至尊红颜	Michael Jia Ruoqi	
2005	The Rainbow Connection 舞出彩虹	Martin 李天乐	
2005	Beyond The aXis of Truth II 法医X档案 2	Kong Zichong	
2005	Heartlanders 4	Cpl Darren Ho	Channel 5 production
2005	PS...I Love You 天...使我爱你		
2005	A Life of Hope 活下去		
2005	My Lucky Charm 情来运转		
2004	The Champion 任我遨游		
2004	Daddy's Girl		Channel 5 production
2004	Heartlanders 3'	Cpl Darren Ho	Channel 5 production

== TV Appearance : As a host ==
Appearance	Genre	Country of origin	Language	Year
Rootsmania (co-host)	Infotainment	Singapore	Mandarin Chinese	2004
iWhiz (co-host)	Gameshow	Singapore	English	2006

== Competitions/Award Ceremonies ==
Year	Citation	Country of origin
2002	Manhunt Singapore 2002 Winner; Official Special Award, Mr Healthy Lifestyle, Manhunt International	Shanghai, China
2003	Semi-finalist, Mr World	London, England
2006	Nominee, Top 10 Most Popular Artistes, Star Awards	Singapore

== Accolades ==
Star Awards – Acting Awards
Year	Ceremony	Category	Nominated work	Result
2005	Star Awards	Best Newcomer	—N/a	Nominated
2006	Star Awards	Top 10 Most Popular Male Artistes	—N/a	Nominated
