= Jeanette Aw =

Singaporean actress and businesswoman (born 1979)

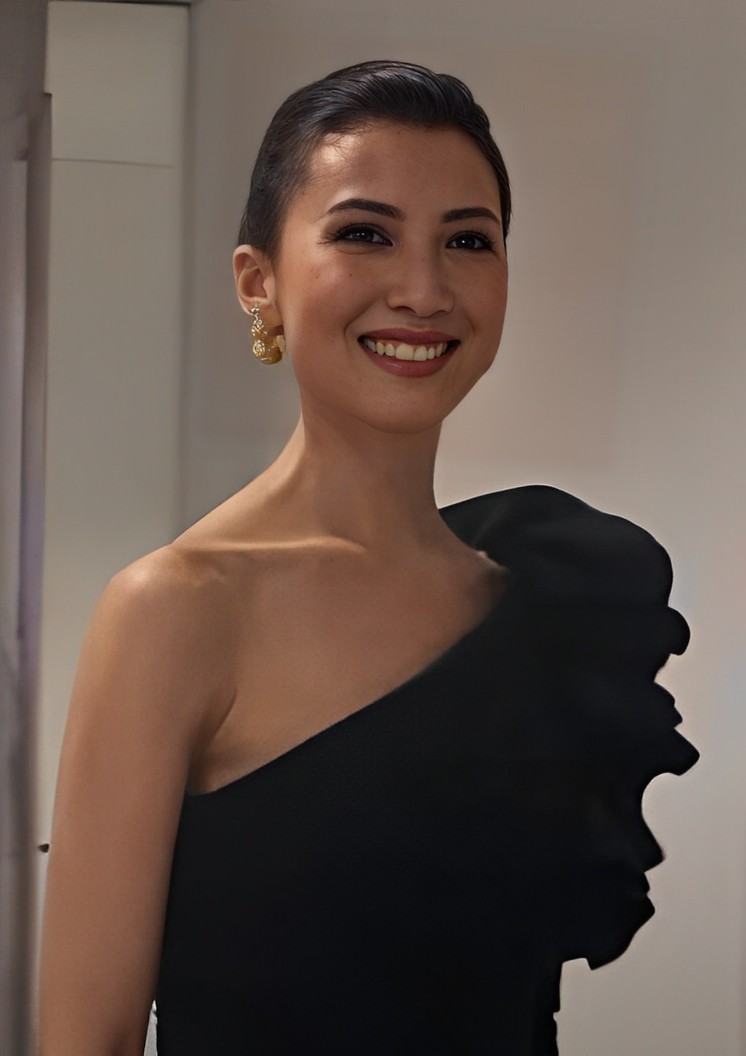
- Aw at the Star Awards 2017
- Born: Jeanette Aw Ee-Ping; 28 June 1979 (age 47); Singapore
- Other names: Ou Xuan; Ou Yanping
- Education: Raffles Girls' Primary School; Crescent Girls' School; National Junior College; National University of Singapore
- Occupations: Actress; host; filmmaker; businesswoman; writer
- Years active: 2001–present
- Agent: Picturesque Films
- Awards: Full list

Stage name
- Traditional Chinese: 歐萱
- Simplified Chinese: 欧萱
- Hanyu Pinyin: Ōu Xuān
- Jyutping: Au1 Hyun1

Birth name
- Traditional Chinese: 歐燕蘋
- Simplified Chinese: 欧燕苹
- Hanyu Pinyin: Ōu Yànpíng

YouTube information
- Channel: JA Unscripted
- Years active: 2015–present
- Genre: Lifestyle/personal vlog
- Subscribers: 23,900
- Views: 4.7 million
- Last updated: 27 April 2026
- Website: jcode.sg

Jeanette Aw Ee-Ping (born 28 June 1979), also known as Ou Xuan, is a Singaporean actress, host, filmmaker, businesswoman and writer. Aw was named as one of the Seven Princesses of Mediacorp in 2006, after which she achieved wider success with her leading role in acclaimed drama The Little Nyonya. She was a full-time Mediacorp artiste from 2002 to 2017 and was once managed by Hype Records.

Through her television career, Aw has established herself as one of the most popular and high-profile celebrities in Singapore. She has won 29 popularity and performance awards, the record number for a performer, at Singapore Mediacorp's Star Awards. Aw has published two books; Jeanette Aw: Definitions in 2012 and Sol's World: Somebody to Love in 2015. She also starred in musical Beauty World in 2015.

While in college, Aw entered TV talent scouting competition Route to Glamour, in which she placed first. She signed on with SPH Mediaworks and made her acting debut in the 2001 drama Touched. Aw then signed on to Mediacorp in 2002 and played the intellectually challenged character Mo Jingjing in Holland V (2003). Aw garnered critical appreciation for portraying flawed actress, Zhao Fei Er, in The Dream Makers (2013) and its 2015 sequel. She won her first Best Actress award at the Star Awards for her performance in the latter drama.

She ventured into film production, producing The Last Entry and Senses through her own production company, Picturesque Films. She also started her own pastry shop, Once Upon a Time, after studying culinary arts.

== Early life ==
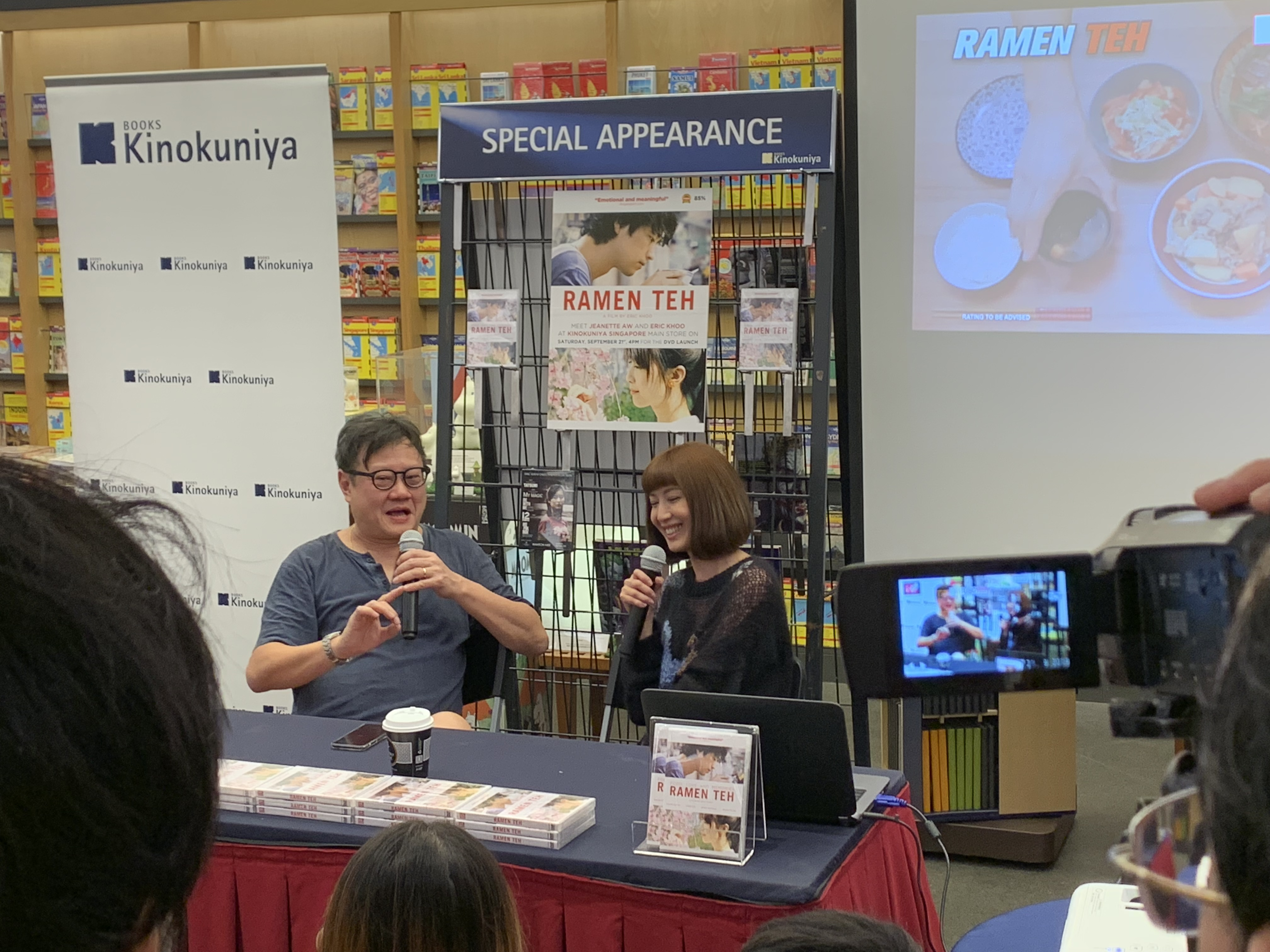
Eric Khoo and Aw at the DVD Premiere of Ramen Teh

Aw was born in Singapore as a Hokkien with ancestry from Quanzhou city, Southern Fujian, China. She has an elder sister and an elder brother. Coming from an English-speaking family, Aw rarely used Mandarin in their conversations. She considered her childhood blessed and fortunate because her parents provided for everything that she needed. Growing up with a carefree nature, she was an introvert and was "the kind of girl who loved reading, writing and drawing". Aw wanted to be a dancer, an artist or a child psychologist.

Attending Raffles Girls' Primary School, Crescent Girls' School, National Junior College and National University of Singapore, Aw was a school prefect and a model student. Her best subjects were English Literature and English, and she scored an A for art at the O Levels.

Aw did gymnastics in primary school, dance in secondary school and swimming in junior college. She started ballet training at 13, and Aw went on to dance almost every day before signing her first acting contract. She also played the saxophone in her secondary school concert band and trained for a girl group in junior college. In university, Aw was President of the NUS Dance Ensemble. Aw decided to pursue a career on stage and eventually graduated with a Bachelor of Arts (Honours) Degree in Theatre Studies.

== Acting career ==
=== 2001–2002: Early work ===
While preparing for her graduation production in her final year at university (before receiving an offer for the Honours Degree program), Aw and her friends also auditioned at theater companies. A friend told her that a company was looking for actors, and Aw only learnt that it was a television station after submitting her application. Joining Route to Glamour, a talent search organised in Singapore and Malaysia by the now defunct television network SPH MediaWorks in 2000, Aw beat over 5000 applicants to emerge champion and signed on with the network. In her debut year, she was awarded "Best Performer" and "Best Newcomer" and co-starred in a Taiwanese television drama. Aw left SPH MediaWorks in early 2002 to complete her studies, joined Hype Records and then officially signed on as a Mediacorp artiste in May 2002. She starred as Fan Keke in Beautiful Connection, the highest-rated Singapore drama in 2002, and won the Best Newcomer award at Star Awards 2002. Aw also filmed the Taiwanese idol drama Kiss of a Toast II.

=== 2003–2007: Public recognition ===
In 2003, Aw acted in True Heroes, before going on to star as Mo Jingjing, a young woman with low IQ, in Holland V. It was the most watched Singapore drama that year, and she grew popular for playing the character. Aw was nominated for Best Actress at Star Awards 2003, but lost to co-star Chen Liping. However, she won her first "Top 10 Most Popular Female Artistes" award. After the mega success of Holland V, Aw was seen as a possible successor of the Ah Jie (big sister) status. In 2004, Aw starred in her first female lead role as Wen Qian in Spice Siblings alongside Tay Ping Hui and Cynthia Koh. Following that, she starred in two dramas – A Child's Hope II and The Champion. Aw was again nominated for Best Actress for her excellent performance in A Child's Hope II and also won the "Top 10 Most Popular Female Artistes" award at Star Awards 2004.

Following two years of non-stop filming, Aw became less productive in 2005. In January, she starred as Fang Lixiang in My Lucky Charm alongside Huang Biren. That year, Aw filmed one drama, The Rainbow Connection, where she played Ding Yingying, a talented dancer who has stage fright. This drama involved an ensemble cast drawing from Singapore, mainland China, Taiwan, Hong Kong and Malaysia. As Aw was also a dancer, she performed in many dancing scenes. Though Aw did not manage a Best Actress nomination at Star Awards 2005, she won her third "Top 10 Most Popular Female Artistes" award. In 2006, Aw played a schizophrenic character who hated her father in C.I.D. before starring in Through It All. She clinched her fourth "Top 10 Most Popular Female Artistes" award at Star Awards 2006. In December 2006, the term Seven Princesses of Mediacorp was coined as part of Mediacorp publication iWeekly's 476th issue cover story.

Aw's drama The Peak was screened in January 2007. She played Zhong Xiao Yang, a ship construction worker who became disabled after saving her boyfriend. The drama was filmed around the time of Aw's loss of her godmother, and while many expected her to be nominated for Best Actress at the annual Star Awards, she did not manage a return to the nominees list. In July, Aw was involved in Switched! starring opposite Fann Wong, where she played Jiang Xinhui, a famous, wilful and materialistic actress. Her final 2007 drama, Dear, Dear Son-In-Law, was screened in October 2007.

=== 2008–2009: Breakthrough ===
In 2008, Aw spent four months filming in China for the Chinese production The Shaolin Warriors. She then starred as Chen Xiaorou in Rhythm of Life and Lin Keyi in The Defining Moment where she was praised for her good acting. Then came Aw's big opportunity: to star in Mediacorp's mega-blockbuster production, The Little Nyonya. Several actresses auditioned for the main female lead role for which Aw was selected. Many viewers saw it as a series conceived to boost Aw's television career and to secure the Best Actress award for her at the following Star Awards, and criticism was levelled at Mediacorp's bias towards Aw. Several viewers also believed that the producers intentionally wrote Aw's first role as a mute in attempt to conceal her imperfect delivery of Mandarin. In response, producers lauded Aw's work, saying that she performed in a professional manner. Aw's dual portrayal of Yamamoto Yueniang and Huang Juxiang (the mother to her primary character) was also praised by members of the audience. The drama became the most watched Singapore drama in 15 years and was a huge success. Aw gained many more fans and was hailed as the third-generation Ah Jie. Despite receiving a third Best Actress nomination at Star Awards 2009, Aw surprisingly lost to her co-star Joanne Peh. In end-2009, Aw acted in Together with Dai Xiangyu for the third time.

=== 2010–2014: Continued success ===
In 2010, Aw played a funeral director hoping to improve people's perceptions of her profession in New Beginnings. She had overcome a health scare during the filming of the drama. Though Aw again failed to win, she clinched her fourth and fifth Best Actress nominations respectively for Together (2010) and blockbuster drama Breakout (2011). Originally scheduled to film Absolutely Charming in 2011, Aw instead joined Destiny in Her Hands in Malaysia where she suffered a minor facial injury. In September 2011, Aw completed filming for the drama Precious in China. She played the main lead role and collaborated with Dai Xiangyu – the fifth time in three years. Precious was the remake of The Little Nyonya, and Aw played three roles (the mother Fang Xi Ruo, the daughter Ling Qian Jin and Qian Jin's granddaughter) this time. In 2012, she also filmed Rescue 995 as Shi Hao Ran. A righteous young lady who is bubbly and cheerful, the role differed from Aw's recent emotional roles. 2012 Channel U drama Jump! was her first attempt at a laugh-out-loud comedy, making it a surprising and challenging one. In December that year, Aw played a girl with eyes that can see through anyone's inner world in Beyond.

Said to be Aw's second breakthrough drama, The Dream Makers was Channel 8's 2013 mid-year blockbuster, which featured a grand cast including Zoe Tay, Chen Liping, Chen Hanwei, Qi Yuwu and Rui En. In the drama, Aw played a C-list actress who tries hard to make her way to fame. She received numerous positive comments from viewers and compliments from veteran artistes like Zoe Tay, Chen Han Wei, Bryan Wong and Xiang Yun, which made Aw the hot favourite for Best Actress at Star Awards 20. Following a similar loss to Chen Liping at Star Awards 2003 however, she was again beaten to the award by her co-star and broke the record for most nominations (6) without a win. Aw clinched five popularity awards, including "Favourite Female Character" and "Favourite Onscreen Couple" with Qi Yu Wu for the drama. At the Star Awards 20 Show 1, she became the first artiste to win four awards at a single show since the inception of Star Awards as well as the first to net five awards in a single year. With Aw clinching a tenth and final "Top 10 Most Popular Female Artistes" award at Star Awards 20 Show 2, she was also the first of the Seven Princesses of Mediacorp to earn the "All-Time Favourite Artiste" accolade.

In 2013, Aw was involved in Channel 8's epic historical drama The Journey: A Voyage which marked her fifth and third collaboration with Elvin Ng and Joanne Peh respectively. Along with cast members Ng and Desmond Tan, Aw promoted the drama – then airing on PPCTV – in Cambodia. In celebration of the 2014 FIFA World Cup, she acted in the football-themed drama World at Your Feet and its spin-off, Unexpected Strangers, a telemovie made for Mediacorp's on-demand service Toggle. In August 2014, Aw played a tomboy chef in Spice Up before starring in The Journey: Tumultuous Times, the second part of The Journey trilogy. Her onscreen combination with co-star Shaun Chen was celebrated for evoking memories of their Holland V pairing.

=== 2015–2017: Best Actress and departure from Mediacorp ===
In February 2015, Aw played a fashionable single blogger known for baring her break-up experiences and shaming her exes online in Channel U drama Let It Go. She nabbed six awards at the Star Awards 2015 Show 1 In July 2015, she guest starred in The Journey: Our Homeland, thus becoming the only cast member to have appeared in all three instalments of the trilogy.

It was announced in May that year that Aw would play Zhao Fei Er for the second time in blockbuster drama The Dream Makers II, the sequel to the 2013 hit series. Even before filming begun, Aw's Best Actress award chances at the following year's Star Awards were highlighted. Aw explained that her character would suffer from depression and she has done some research on the characteristics and behaviour of depression patients to better portray her role. In July, Aw and co-star Zoe Tay promoted the drama at the China International Film & TV Programs Exhibition in Beijing. Later in November, Aw's debut film, Find My Dad, grossed $37,850 over a 14-day limited release. Produced in Malaysia in 2012, Aw played a single mother. At the inaugural PPCTV MediaCorp Awards in Cambodia, Aw was the most decorated artiste, nabbing "Favourite Lead Actress" and "Favourite Female TV Character" for portraying Zhao Fei Er in The Dream Makers. Following the airing of The Dream Makers II in December, Aw's embodiment of the role was lauded. She went on to clinch the awards for "Best Actress", "Favourite Female Character" and "Favourite Onscreen Couple" at Star Awards 2016.

Aw later starred in mid-year blockbuster drama The Dream Job and netted her eighth "Best Actress" nomination at Star Awards 2017 thereafter. She played a triad gangster in season two of the Channel 8 long-form TV drama, 118, and was injured by a shattered glass door during its filming. In March 2017, it was announced that Aw would star in Ramen Teh, a film co-produced by Japan and Singapore, alongside Seiko Matsuda, Takumi Saito and Mark Lee. The film started shooting in Singapore in July and had its world premiere at the Berlin International Film Festival in February the next year. Aw later attended a screening at the San Sebastián International Film Festival and its Paris premiere in September 2018. In limited reporting, Ramen Teh grossed $26,149 in Colombia, $9,384 in Czech Republic, $472,940 in France and $72,984 in Spain.

Aw announced her departures from both Hype Records and Mediacorp in October 2017, saying it was time to move on.

=== 2018–present: Reinvention ===
After departing from Hype Records and Mediacorp, Aw pursued other creative ventures, going into film production, culinary arts, opening a pastry shop, and a YouTube channel. For acting, she would pick roles that she felt would expand her range as an actor.

In November 2018, Aw starred in Till We Meet Again, a drama serial produced by Wawa Pictures and her first drama since going solo. Aw played Tang Xin, the antagonist in the production, and suggested that it might be her final drama. Aw begun filming showbiz-themed drama After The Stars in July 2019.

At the start of 2020, she was in Beijing filming Quiet Among Disquiet (在不安的世界安静地活) as part of the cast. Due to COVID-19 pandemic, she was forced to return to Singapore midway filming in February and completed filming only at the end of the year after arrangements were made to have her scenes completed in Singapore. She was invited by the director Xue Xiaolu to play the role of Meng Lu, despite only having met once three years before during a brand endorsement event. Xue could not find the perfect actress for the role through multiple auditions as she wanted someone with a Western flair as she envisioned Meng Lu as one. While the filming of Quiet was in limbo, she participated in the filming of The Ferryman: Legends of Nanyang (灵魂摆渡之南洋传说), an adaptation of the web series from China, Soul Ferry. The Ferryman was her first foray into the supernatural genre and the director allowed her the creativie control to improvise her role. The Ferryman was eventually released on iQIYI in August 2021. As of 2025, Quiet Among Disquiet remained unreleased, possibly due to fellow cast-mate, Darren Wang's ongoing legal issues.

In 2025, Aw reprised her The Little Nyonya character, Yamamoto Yueniang in Emerald Hill - The Little Nyonya Story, the sequel of the 2008 series. In 2026, Aw took the lead for Highway To Somewhere (一路惊魂).

== Off-screen work ==
=== Film production ===
Aw is the founder of the production company Picturesque Films. In 2017, Aw wrote, directed, and produced The Last Entry, a short film inspired by her godmother's struggles with Alzheimer's disease. The film was selected from over 10,000 films submitted from more than 130 countries and regions around the world for the official competition of Tokyo's Short Shorts Film Festival & Asia 2018. Aw was also invited as one of three competing filmmakers to set a one-minute short of Tokyo as part of the Tokyo Cinema Ensemble project for screening at the Festival Awards Ceremony. The Last Entry eventually missed out on the top prize and eligibility for nomination at the 91st Academy Awards.

Aw filmed a short film Senses in Takasaki, Japan in December 2018 – with a local and Japanese crew. The team in Japan, whom Aw got to know on the set of Ramen Teh, helped her with logistics and auditions in the country.

=== Ambassadorship ===
Following her performance in Ramen Teh which is partly set in Takasaki, Aw was appointed the city's PR ambassador in September 2018. According to the Letter of Appointment, Aw "shall endeavour to promote the city’s tourism, products and information to Singapore and the world".

=== Endorsements ===
From 2001 to 2002, Aw made her first commercials for AsiaOne, Glamour Shot, OTO, Singtel, and Sony Batteries. She then endorsed LifePharm Intenz Skin Activator and Pokka Vegetable Juice in 2003, and with her rising popularity in 2004, Aw became the official ambassadress for SK Jewellery for the first time. This was followed by StarHub i-mode in 2005 and 2006. With the roaring success of The Little Nyonya, Aw picked up endorsement opportunities for IZU, Kim Robinson, NETS, New Moon, OSIM uSqueez Warm, and Sakura International Buffet Restaurant. From 2010 to 2012, she modeled for Olay Regenerist, OWL, and Reduze as well as SK Jewellery again, and was named the queen of endorsements. In July 2015, Aw began to appear in advertisements for Bio-Essence, a skincare company.

Aw is a Montblanc brand ambassador, notably gracing the 2016 launch of the Bohème Lady collection with Miss World 2007 Zhang Zilin and film director and screenwriter Xue Xiaolu. Together with executive Chinese chef Brian Wong of Marriott Tang Plaza Hotel's Wan Hao Chinese Restaurant, Aw created a Peranakan-Chinese fusion menu as part of American Express' Love Dining programme in 2017. Aw became the ambassador of ClearSK in December 2017, before representing global brand Lancôme in August 2019.

=== Social and humanitarian work ===
Aw has visited children's homes and made overseas volunteer trips for underprivileged children. In 2012, Aw collaborated with Precious Moments and reportedly received a five-figure sum which she donated to a charity for children with cancer. In May 2016, Aw, a brand ambassador for Bulgari, helped to raise funds for a Save the Children program in Vietnam.

=== Books ===
Aw published her debut book, Jeanette Aw: Definitions, in February 2012 containing aspects of her personal life. In this work, which includes black-and-white photos and sketches she drew, Aw defined what was important to her in words from A to Z. Among the revelations was a breast cancer scare in 2010 – she discovered a lump in her breast, but it turned out to be benign. Aw also wrote about playing mother to her three young godchildren as well as her interest in drawing and sketching. The title topped the best-selling lists of all major Singapore bookstores. A month later, Aw released Jeanette Aw: Definitions (Limited Edition).

In May 2015, Aw followed up with her second book, Sol's World: Somebody to Love, concerning the titular character's journey of self-discovery. The picture book is the result of over two years of hard work and all illustrations were hand-painted. The character Sol began as an illustration which accompanied Aw's column in Mediacorp publication iWeekly in 2010. Over the years, she grew attached to the character and decided to make Sol the central figure of this book. As part of its Children's Season "Masak Masak 2015", Aw's artwork from the book and new drawings were exhibited at the National Museum of Singapore from May to August 2015. The Sol's World: Somebody to Love exhibition included her display "Simple Pleasures in Life & Life's Best Journey is with The One You Love" and two other artist interpretations of her book.

=== Stage performances ===
Inspired by the popularity of The Little Nyonya, Aw headlined The Peranakan Ball in May 2009 at the Singapore Indoor Stadium and paired up with Dai Xiangyu again. Other cast members of the musical included veteran Mediacorp artistes like Xiang Yun, Ann Kok and Rayson Tan as well as Project SuperStar's Chen Diya and Carrie Yeo.

Aw performed at Singapore Day in Shanghai in 2011 and 2015.

In November 2015, Aw became the latest Singapore television celebrity to take to the stage in a re-staging of Dick Lee and Michael Chiang's iconic musical Beauty World at Victoria Theatre. She played the character Lulu, a vindictive cabaret queen. Aw was commended for her "convincing acting" and her "perfect" enactment as she "gave off the vibe of a cunning and manipulative cabaret queen easily" without a single word spoken. Despite various criticism of Aw's vocal abilities and inability to project a presence, director Dick Lee praised her overall performance.

=== Culinary arts and business venture ===
In June 2018, Aw moved to Bangkok and enrolled in the Diplôme de Pâtisserie course at the Le Cordon Bleu Dusit Culinary School. She was appointed International Brand Ambassador of the school. Aw completed her course at Le Cordon Bleu Tokyo in Daikanyamachō, Shibuya in 2019. In mid-2021, Aw opened her first pastry shop, Once Upon A Time, at Hamilton Road in Jalan Besar. Aw lost S$8,000 (US$5,970.15) to a long-time delivery vendor who was handling the delivery of the pastries to customer. He stated that it was for a package fee to develop an application as well a personal loan before disappearing with the money.

From mid-January to 14 February 2024, Aw ran pop-up booths of her patisserie brand Once Upon A Time in department stores in three Japanese cities – Seibu in Tokyo, Hankyu in Osaka and Takashimaya in Nagoya. Buoyant from strong responses to her products, she would bring the brand back to Japan for Valentine's Day annually in the following years in form of pop-up booths at various locations.

Once Upon A Time closed in December 2025, and reopened in Geylang in March 2026.

=== Others ===
Jeanius (Singapore) is Aw's official fan club and was established on 29 December 2004. The club's name is derived from Aw's first name, Jeanette, and the word "genius". It is the only official fan club acknowledged by Aw. Over the years, the club has worked closely with Aw's past management, Artiste Networks (under Hype Records). Jeanius (Singapore) has expanded its fan base to regional countries such as Cambodia, China, and Malaysia.

In 2025, Aw launched her YouTube channel, JA Unscripted, which provided audience a candid view of her life as she tried new experiences and interviews with others around her.

== In the media ==
Aw is one of the most popular actresses in Singapore, and she keeps her personal life well-guarded. Aw has appeared on the covers of lifestyle magazines, ranging from Mediacorp publications like 8 Days, Elle Singapore, iWeekly, Style:Weddings and uWeekly as well as SPH magazines like Cleo Singapore, Female, Her World, ICON, Nuyou, Nuyou Time and Simply Her to others like #313Foodie, Citta Bella, Ezyhealth and LiveWell (all Singapore), Citta Bella, Feminine, My Wedding, Oriental Cuisine and Sisters (all Malaysia) and Ladies (Cambodia). From 2007 to 2009, FHM Singapore ranked her among the Top 100 Sexiest Women.

Aw is also the only Singapore television actress with at least a million Facebook fans. Along with seven triumphs at the Singapore Blog Awards and the "Social Media Award" at Star Awards in 2014 and 2015, Aw was popularly referred to as Caldecott Hill's social media queen.

Often pitted against fellow Singaporean actress Rui En by local television audiences, the pair had swept popularity awards like "Favourite Female Character" and "Favourite Onscreen Couple" throughout the history of these categories at the annual Star Awards. Aw had clarified that there was no personal rivalry, something Rui En also described as having "outgrown the whole princesses thing". Ken Lim, owner of Hype Records which used to manage both actresses together, added, "Rui En and Jeanette appeal to different fans, and this is why they are both at the top of their game. Rui En is the one with the attitude, while Jeanette is relatable."

== Filmography ==
=== Television series ===
Year	Title	Role	Notes	Ref.
2001	Touched (情色男女)			
2001	Web of love			
2002	Beautiful Connection	Fan Keke		
2002	Strange Encounter (奇妙人生之爱情递送)			
2002	Kiss of a Toast II (吐司男之吻II)	Mo Ya-ling		
2002	Cash is King (胜券在握)	Ding Xiaoyi		
2003	Holland V	Mo Jingjing		
2003	True Heroes	Chen Huimin		
2004	The Champion	Guo Jingwen		
2004	A Child's Hope II	Lin Jinghao		
2004	Spice Siblings	Wen Qing		
2005	The Rainbow Connection (舞出彩虹)	Yoyo		
2005	My Lucky Charm	Fang Lixiang		
2006	Through It All (海的儿子)	Cheng Xiaoxuan		
2006	C.I.D.	Fang Jiayi		
2007	Dear, Dear Son in Law	Jiang Yijun		
2007	Switched!	Jiang Xinhui		
2007	The Peak	Zhong Xiaoyang		
2008	Rhythm of Life	Chen Xiaorou		
2008	The Defining Moment	Lin Keyi		
2008	The Shaolin Warriors	Haiqing		
2008	The Little Nyonya	Huang Juxiang		
2008	The Little Nyonya	Yamamoto Yueniang		
2009	Together	Yao Jianhong		
2010	Breakout	Ye Ziqing		
2010	Breakout	Yang Nianqing		
2010	New Beginnings	Cai Shiya		
2011	Precious (千金)	Ling Qianjin		
2011	Destiny in Her Hands	Luo Jinyu		
2012	Beyond	Yang Zhiqing		
2012	Jump!	Xiao Chunli		
2012	Rescue 995	Shi Haoran		
2013	The Journey: A Voyage	Lin Yazi		
2013	The Dream Makers	Zhao Fei'er		
2014	The Journey: Tumultuous Times	Lin Yazi		
2014	The Journey: Tumultuous Times	Hong Minghui		
2014	Spice Up (幸福料理)	Yu Nan		
2014	World at Your Feet	Mo Yuqing		
2015	Let It Go (分手快乐)	Liang Yanneo		
2015	The Journey: Our Homeland	Hong Minghui		
2015	The Dream Makers II	Zhao Fei'er		
2016	The Dream Job	Cheng Huishan		
2016	118 II	Li Taimei		
2018	Till We Meet Again (千年来说对不起)	Tang Xin		
2018	Till We Meet Again (千年来说对不起)	Snow Fox		
2019	After The Stars (攻星计)	Zheng Tian Ai		
2020	Quiet Among Disquiet (在不安的世界安静地活)	Meng Lu		
2021	The Ferryman: Legends of Nanyang (灵魂摆渡之南洋传说)	Nine Tailed Fox		
2023	Come Closer	Mei	Channel 5 series	
2025	Emerald Hill - The Little Nyonya Story (小娘惹之翡翠山)	Yamamoto Yueniang		
2026	Highway To Somewhere (一路惊魂)	Jane Liu		

=== Film ===
Year	Title	Role	Notes	Ref.
2014	Unexpected Strangers (小心陌生人)	Mo Yuqing		
2015	Find My Dad (平平安安)	Ping Ma		
2017	The Last Entry (记·意)	Natalie		
2018	Ramen Teh	Mei Lian		
2019	Senses (心境)	Xuan		
2020	This is Tokyo	Alice Kwang	Short film	

=== Variety and infotainment show appearances ===
Year	Title	Genre	Notes	Ref.
2001	Route to Glamour (新卧虎藏龙)	Variety program	Champion	
2004	Extreme Gourmet 2	Travelogue	Guest; Filmed in China	
2004	Stars of all Trades (行行出艺人)	Info-educational	Features Aw as a kindergarten teacher	
2005	Wish You were Here	Travelogue	Guest; Filmed in Australia (Perth and the Northern Territory)	
2007	The Princesses and the Dude (扮美达人)	Info-educational	Guest on Episode 1	
2008	Good Morning Singapore (早安你好)	News program	Promoted Rhythm of Life	
2009	Good Morning Singapore (早安你好)	News program	Promoted Together	
2010	穿越外景地 – 新加坡: 本土文化之旅	Travelogue	旅游卫视 production (Beijing, China)	
2010	The Green Room (今日VIP)	Talk show	TVB production (Hong Kong)	
2010	<<小娘惹>> 厨房大作战	Info-educational	TVB production (Hong Kong)	
2010	E-News Front Line (娱乐最前线)	Magazine program	TVB production (Hong Kong)	
2010	Starry Kitchen (星级厨房)	Info-educational	TVB production (Hong Kong)	
2010	One Moment of Glory	Talent search competition	Guest judge	
2010	Evolution (一起看过去)	Info-educational	Guest	
2010	Stars for a Cause 2 (明星志工队 2)	Info-educational	Guest; Filmed in Gansu, China	
2011	Stars for a Cause 3 (明星志工队 3)	Info-educational	Guest; Filmed in Yinchuan, China	
2011	Inside Job	Info-educational	Guest on Episode 3	
2012	S.N.A.P. (熠熠星光总动员)	Talent search competition	Guest on Episode 8	
2013	Celebrate TV50	Variety special	Guest performer	
2013	CTN 10th Anniversary Show	Variety special	Cambodian Television Network production	
2013	Asia Style Collection	Variety special	Modeled for styleXstyle Asian Fashion Collection 2013	
2014	Minute to Win It (១នាទីដើម្បីឈ្នះ)	Game show	Cambodian Television Network production	
2014	Entertainment Tonight	Variety	Promoted World at Your Feet; Cambodian Television Network production	
2014	Star's Day Off (今天不开工)	Info-educational	Guest on Episode 6	
2014	Say It! 2 (好好说慢慢讲2)	Info-educational	Guest on Episode 2	
2014	The Joy Truck 2 (快乐速递 2)	Info-educational	Guest on Episode 10	
2015	Singapore Tonight	News program	Promoted Sol's World: Somebody to Love as part of "Masak Masak 2015"	
2015	The 5 Show	Magazine program	Promoted Sol's World: Somebody to Love	
2021	Crème De La Crème	Baking contest program	Host and judge with Fann Wong	
2023	Crème De La Crème II	Baking contest program	Host and judge with Fann Wong	

== Theatre ==
Year	Title	Role	Ref.
2009	The Peranakan Ball	Bee Tin	
2015	Beauty World	Lulu	

== Discography ==
=== Compilation albums ===
Year	English title	Mandarin title
2009	Mediacorp Lunar New Year Album 09	群星贺岁福牛迎瑞年
2012	Mediacorp Lunar New Year Album 12	群星贺岁金龙接财神
2013	Mediacorp Lunar New Year Album 13	群星贺岁金蛇献祥和
2015	MediaCorp Music Lunar New Year Album 15	新传媒群星金羊添吉祥

== Published works ==
- Aw, Jeanette (2012). Jeanette Aw: Definitions. GLM Pte Ltd. ISBN 978-9810712570.
- Aw, Jeanette (2015). Sol's World: Somebody To Love. Candid Creation Publishing. ISBN 978-9810929886.

== Awards and nominations ==
Year	Ceremony	Category	Nominated work	Result	Ref.
2002	Star Awards	Best Newcomer	—N/a	Won	
2003	Star Awards	Best Actress	Holland V (as Mo Jingjing)	Nominated	
2003	Star Awards	Top 10 Most Popular Female Artistes	—N/a	Won	
2004	Star Awards	Best Actress	A Child's Hope II (as Lin Jinghao)	Nominated	
2004	Star Awards	Top 10 Most Popular Female Artistes	—N/a	Won	
2005	Star Awards	Top 10 Most Popular Female Artistes	—N/a	Won	
2006	Star Awards	Top 10 Most Popular Female Artistes	—N/a	Won	
2007	Star Awards	Top 10 Most Popular Female Artistes	—N/a	Nominated	
2008	Asian Television Awards	Best Actress in a Leading Role	Rhythm of Life (as Chen Xiaorou)	Nominated	
2009	Star Awards	Best Actress	The Little Nyonya (as Yamamoto Yueniang)	Nominated	
2009	Star Awards	Top 10 Most Popular Female Artistes	—N/a	Won	
2010	Star Awards	Best Actress	Together (as Yao Jianghong)	Nominated	
2010	Star Awards	Favourite Female Character	—N/a	Won	
2010	Star Awards	Top 10 Most Popular Female Artistes	—N/a	Won	
2010	Asian Television Awards	Best Actress in a Leading Role	Together (as Yao Jianghong)	Nominated	
2011	Star Awards	Best Actress	Breakout (as Ye Nianqing)	Nominated	
2011	Star Awards	Top 10 Most Popular Female Artistes	—N/a	Won	
2011	Star Awards	Favourite Female Character	Breakout (as Ye Nianqing)	Nominated	
2011	Star Awards	Favourite Onscreen Couple with (Christopher Lee)	Breakout (as Ye Nianqing)	Won	
2011	Star Awards	Systema Most Charming Smile Award	—N/a	Nominated	
2011	Star Awards	iWeekly Most Stylish Award	—N/a	Won	
2012	Star Awards	Top 10 Most Popular Female Artistes	—N/a	Won	
2013	Star Awards	Top 10 Most Popular Female Artistes	—N/a	Won	
2014	Star Awards	Best Actress	The Dream Makers (as Zhao Feier)	Nominated	
2014	Star Awards	Favourite Female Character	The Dream Makers (as Zhao Feier)	Won	
2014	Star Awards	Favourite Onscreen Couple with (Qi Yuwu)	The Dream Makers (as Zhao Feier)	Won	
2014	Star Awards	Social Media Award	—N/a	Won	
2014	Star Awards	Most Popular Regional Artiste (Cambodia)	—N/a	Won	
2014	Star Awards	Most Popular Regional Artiste (China)	—N/a	Nominated	
2014	Star Awards	Most Popular Regional Artiste (Indonesia)	—N/a	Nominated	
2014	Star Awards	Most Popular Regional Artiste (Malaysia)	—N/a	Nominated	
2014	Star Awards	Top 10 Most Popular Female Artistes	—N/a	Won	
2015	Star Awards	All-Time Favourite Artiste	—N/a	Won	
2015	Star Awards	Favourite Female Character	The Journey: Tumultuous Times (as Hong Minghui)	Won	
2015	Star Awards	Favourite Onscreen Couple with (Zhang Zhenxuan)	World at Your Feet (as Mo Yuqing)	Won	
2015	Star Awards	Social Media Award	—N/a	Won	
2015	Star Awards	Most Popular Regional Artiste (Cambodia)	—N/a	Won	
2015	Star Awards	Most Popular Regional Artiste (China)	—N/a	Nominated	
2015	Star Awards	Most Popular Regional Artiste (Indonesia)	—N/a	Won	
2015	Star Awards	Most Popular Regional Artiste (Malaysia)	—N/a	Won	
2016	Star Awards	Best Actress	The Dream Makers II (as Zhao Feier)	Won	
2016	Star Awards	Favourite Female Character	The Dream Makers II (as Zhao Feier)	Won	
2016	Star Awards	Favourite Onscreen Couple with (Qi Yuwu)	The Dream Makers II (as Zhao Feier)	Won	
2017	Star Awards	Best Actress	The Dream Job (as Cheng Huishan)	Nominated	
