= The Champion (TV series) =

- 任我遨游
- Genre: Sports; Drama
- Created by: Yeo Saik Pin
- Starring: Toro; Yen Hsing-su; Qi Yuwu; Jeanette Aw; Julian Hee; Felicia Chin; Fiona Xie; Joyce Zhao; Jesseca Liu
- Opening theme: 任我遨游 by Yen Hsing-su and Toro
- Country of origin: Singapore
- Original language: Mandarin
- No. of episodes: 20

Production
- Producer: Yeo Saik Pin

Original release
- Network: Mediacorp Channel 8
- Release: 20 October – 16 November 2004

The Champion (Chinese: 任我遨游; pinyin: Rèn Wǒ Áoyóu) is a swimming drama produced by Mediacorp Channel 8 in Singapore. It was telecast from 20 October 2004 to 16 November 2004. The show stars Toro, Yen Hsing-su, Qi Yuwu, Julian Hee, Jeanette Aw, Felicia Chin, Fiona Xie, Joyce Zhao and Jesseca Liu all young actors and actresses. This show also marked Jesseca Liu's acting debut.

== Plot ==
The series mainly dealt with the trials and travails of a Singaporean swimming team, the Flying Fish (飞鱼队, which could be a reference to a classic Singaporean drama about an aspiring swimmer, Flying Fish), and its constituent members. The team is locked in a vicious competition with the Seagulls swimming team (海鸥队), whose superior swimming abilities bred an intense arrogance that shows everywhere within the swimming complex they practice in.

After the Flying Fish lost a bet with the Seagulls, which resulted in the Flying Fish team running down Orchard Road wearing only bikinis, the team's manager hired a new swimming coach to rescue the team from the brink of dissolution. The coach, Ivan Jackson (also known as Wu Zhenkang), was very strict about the rigorous training, and this drew massive opposition at first, and earned him the title of "Polar Bear" (cold, uncaring, and "foreign"). However, the team's performance eventually improved, thanks to the training.

=== Subplots ===
The main subplot revolved around Guo Jingwen. Her constant tardiness earned her the dubious title of "Tardy Queen" (迟到Queen). The new coach, at first, kicked her off the team because of this, but what the coach did not know was Jingwen came from a dysfunctional and poor family, where the father works low-pay jobs to feed his two daughters and son. Jingwen's younger sister was paralyzed during a childhood illness, and uses a wheelchair for mobility. Jingwen's brother is a rebellious teenager, whose antics with his hooligan friends have drawn the ire of his father. Meanwhile, Jingwen works as a swimming coach to bring extra income to the cash-strapped family. Once the coach learned about this, he relaxed his strict rules on timeliness for Jingwen. The close relationship Zhenkang had with Jingwen almost cost Zhenkang his wife. Later on, Lu Kaiwei falls for Jingwen, after being dumped by his girlfriend He Yixuan.

Another subplot, developed later on in the series, was between Lu Kaixin and He Yilin. They were both in love with Xie Jiajun, and this resulted in Yilin, who believed she was superior in all aspects to Kaixin, to lace Kaixin's water with steroids during a swimming competition. This cost Kaixin her gold medal, and put the team in jeopardy. Another contributing factor was the fact that Kaixin's older brother Kaiwei had broken up with Yilin's older sister Yixuan. Yilin later defected to the Seagulls to try to defeat Kaixin, but Kaixin defeated Yilin in a swimming duel, and Yilin was subsequently kicked off the Seagulls for the Steroid scandal, in addition to her poor attitude towards the coach of the team, and an incident where Yilin allegedly posted defamatory posters inside the Swimming Complex against the Flying Fish. Completely defeated (and disgraced by the Seagulls), Yilin gave up on her quest for superiority, and allowed Kaixin to have Jiajun. The Flying Fish members eventually forgave Yilin.

== Cast ==
- Qi Yuwu as Lu Kaiwei
- Jeanette Aw as Guo Jingwen
- Fiona Xie as Lu Kaixin
- Felicia Chin as Wang Tong
- Joyce Chao as He Yilin
- Julian Hee as Zhang Jinxiang
- Toro as Xie Jiajun
- Yen Hsing-su as Wu Zhenkang
- Jamie Yeo as Huang Anni
- Huai En as Guo Jinglong
- Cheryl Chan as Guo Jingfang
- Jesseca Liu as He Yixuan
- Joey Ng as Tao Yan

== Accolades ==
Organisation	Year	Category	Nominee	Result	Ref
Star Awards	2007	Best Classic Scenes Award	Felicia Chin	Won	
Star Awards	2007	Best Drama Serial	—N/a	Nominated	

== See also ==
- Flying Fish: a 1983 Singapore Broadcasting Corporation TV series that also revolved around swimming and competition.
- Splash to Victory, a 1989 Singapore Broadcasting Corporation series that revolved around two swimming sisters.
