= Qi Yuwu =

Chinese actor based in Singapore (born 1976)

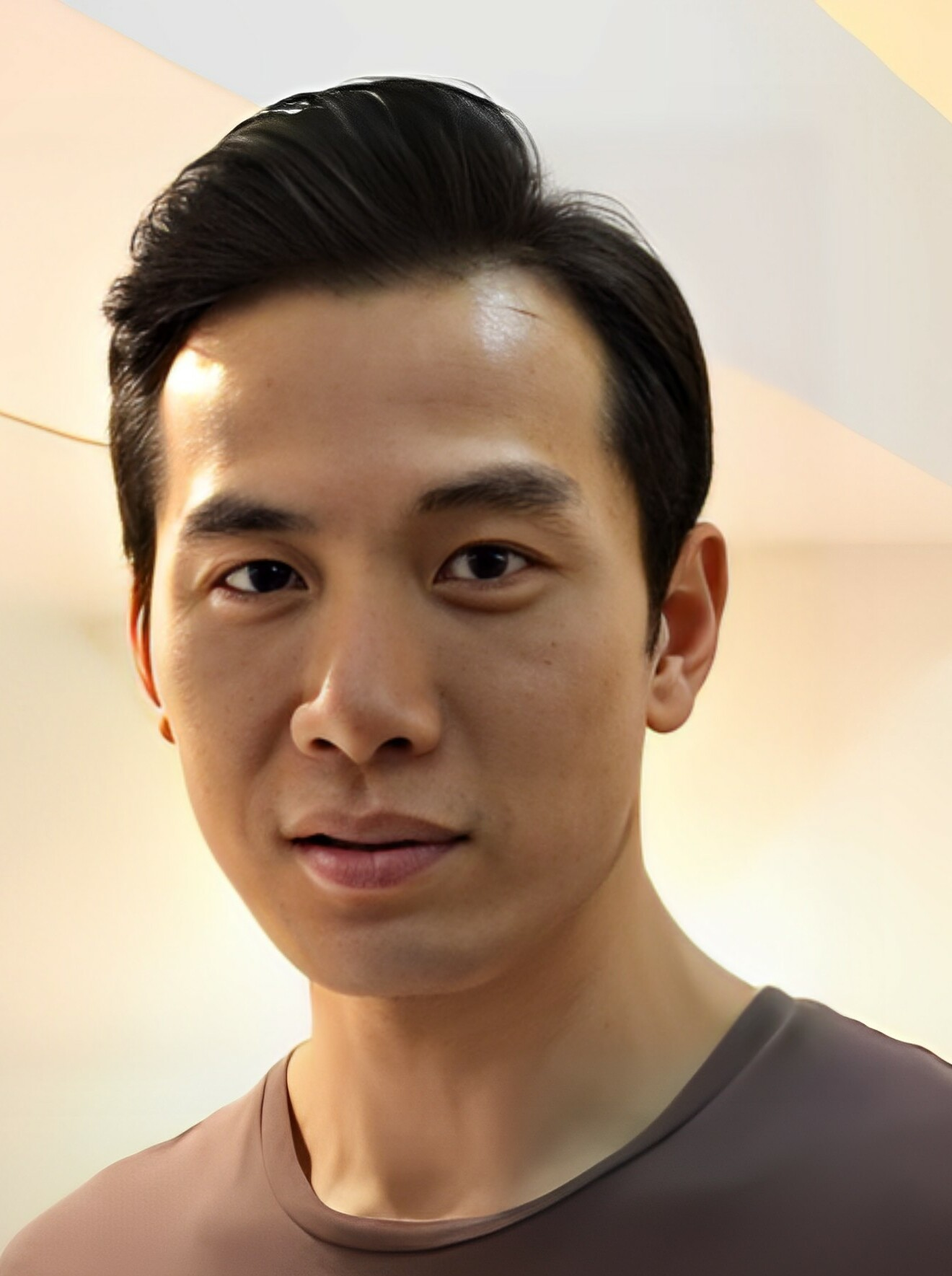
- Qi in November 2017
- Born: 28 November 1976 (age 49); Guangzhou, Guangdong, China
- Education: Guangzhou Physical Education Institute
- Occupations: Actor; host
- Years active: 1999–present
- Employer: Mediacorp
- Agent: The Celebrity Agency; (1999-Present)
- Notable work: The Little Nyonya (2008); The Family Court (2010)
- Spouse: Joanne Peh (m. 2014)
- Children: 2
- Awards: Full list

Chinese name
- Traditional Chinese: 戚玉武
- Simplified Chinese: 戚玉武
- Hanyu Pinyin: Qī Yùwǔ

Qi Yuwu (born 28 November 1976) is a Chinese actor based in Singapore. He is a permanent resident of Singapore and a contracted artiste under Beijing Enlight Media Group.

== Early life and career ==
Apart from acting in Singaporean television dramas, Qi has also starred in international films, some of which were produced by Mediacorp Raintree Pictures. He also starred in the Australian-Singaporean 3-D horror film Bait 3D (2012).

== Personal life ==
In April 2013, Qi began dating co-star Joanne Peh. On 9 September 2014, the couple got married at The Mövenpick Heritage Hotel Sentosa.

On 28 January 2015, the couple announced that they were expecting their first child. On 7 August 2015, Qi and Peh welcomed a baby girl at Mount Elizabeth Hospital.

In October 2016, Qi and Peh announced that they were expecting a second child, and on 21 April 2017 Peh gave birth to a boy.

== Filmography ==
=== Film ===
Year	Title	Role	Notes
2005	P.S...I Luv U	Feng	
2007	Protégé	Singapore customs officer	Cameo
2007	881	Guan Yin	
2007	The Home Song Stories	Joe	Nominated - Best Actor, 49th Australian Film Institute Awards
2008	Toilet Love		
2008	The Leap Years	K.S.	
2008	12 Lotus	Ah Long / Long 2	
2008	Painted Skin	Xiaoyi	
2010	14 Blades	Xuanwu	
2011	The Founding of a Party	Wang Jinmei	
2012	Nightclub School Hospital	Li Wei	
2012	Bait 3D	Steven	
2015	1965	Inspector Cheng	
2016	Tian Huo Xing Dong (天火行動)		
2018	Fat Buddies	Qi Sir	
2018	English		
2019	Walk with Me		
2019	If Thoughts Can Kill (他她他她)		

=== Television series ===
Year	Title	Role	Notes	Ref.
2000	Master Swordsman Lu Xiaofeng	Sikong Zhaixing		
2000	Dare to Strike (扫冰者)	He Qingwei		
2001	In Pursuit of Peace	Lin Fan		
2001	The Hotel	Qi Weiwu		
2001	My Genie (我爱精灵)	Zhang Taiping		
2002	Bukit Ho Swee (河水山)	Cai Yongsong		
2002	Brotherhood (有情有义)	Fan Wen		
2002	Beautiful Connection	Zheng Ruisheng		
2002	My Genie II (我爱精灵II)	Zhang Taiping		
2003	Love is Beautiful (美丽家庭)	Xie Langping		
2003	Romance De Amour (1加1等于3)	Zheng Xuelun		
2004	Room in My Heart (真心蜜语)	Zhu Jiankang		
2004	To Mum with Love (非一般妈妈)	Lin Zhengzhi		
2004	The Champion	Lu Kaiwei		
2004	I Love My Home (我爱我家)	Xu Chuanguo		
2005	A Promise for Tomorrow	Spiderman		
2005	Beyond The aXis of Truth II	Ye Zhongxin		
2005	Beautiful Illusions	Dave Zhou Jianwei		
2006	C.I.D.	Tang Siwei		
2006	Yours Always (让爱自邮)	Fang You		
2007	The Peak	Chen Tianjun		
2008	The Little Nyonya	Chen Xi		
2010	Precious Babes	Yuan Renxian		
2010	The Family Court	Lin Leshan		
2011	Painted Skin	Long Yun		
2011	C.L.I.F.	Tang Yaojia		
2011	A Song to Remember	Mo Liguang		
2013	C.L.I.F. 2	Tang Yaojia		
2013	The Dream Makers	Jason Lam Qinhui		
2014	C.L.I.F. 3	Tang Yaojia		
2015	The Dream Makers II	Jason Lam Qinhui		
2018	Mind Matters	Zhuo Jinshu		
2019	Day Break (天空渐渐亮)	Zhang Tianliang		
2019	A World of Difference (都市狂想)	Pan Guosheng		
2020	A Quest to Heal	Bi Zheng		
2021	Live Your Dreams (大大的梦想)	Fang Wenbin		
2021	The Ferryman: Legends Of Nanyang	Zhao Li		
2022	Dark Angel (黑天使)	Zhu Wei		
2023	Healer (灵师)	Guo Zhengnan		
2024	Once Upon a New Year's Eve (那一年的除夕夜)	Cai Yiren		
2025	The Spirit Hunter (带剑女孩）	Zhou Dekun		

=== Show hosting ===
Year	Title	Notes	Ref.
2022	Wu Suo Bu Tan (武所不谈)	YouTube show	
2023	The Star Athlete (星牌运动员)	Co-host	

== Awards and nominations ==
Year	Organisation	Category	Nominated work	Result	Ref.
2000	Star Awards	Best Newcomer	—N/a	Nominated	
2004	Star Awards	Best Actor	Room in My Heart	Nominated	
2004	Star Awards	Top 10 Most Popular Male Artistes	—N/a	Won	
2005	Star Awards	Top 10 Most Popular Male Artistes	—N/a	Won	
2006	Star Awards	Top 10 Most Popular Male Artistes	—N/a	Won	
2006	Star Awards	Best Actor	C.I.D.	Nominated	
2007	Star Awards	Top 10 Most Popular Male Artistes	—N/a	Won	
2007	Star Awards	Best Actor	The Peak	Nominated	
2007	2000s Screen Heartthrob	—N/a	—N/a	Nominated	
2009	Star Awards	Top 10 Most Popular Male Artistes	—N/a	Won	
2009	Star Awards	Best Actor	The Little Nyonya	Nominated	
2009	Asian Television Awards	Best Actor in a Leading Role	The Little Nyonya	Won	
2010	Star Awards	Top 10 Most Popular Male Artistes	—N/a	Won	
2011	Star Awards	Best Actor	The Family Court	Won	
2011	Star Awards	Top 10 Most Popular Male Artistes	—N/a	Won	
2011	Asian Television Awards	Best Actor in a Leading Role	The Family Court	Nominated	
2012	Star Awards	Best Actor	C.L.I.F.	Nominated	
2012	Star Awards	Top 10 Most Popular Male Artistes	—N/a	Won	
2012	Star Awards	Favourite Onscreen Couple (Drama)	C.L.I.F.	Nominated (Note: Shared with Joanne Peh)	
2013	Star Awards	Top 10 Most Popular Male Artistes	—N/a	Nominated	
2014	Star Awards	Top 10 Most Popular Male Artistes	—N/a	Won	
2014	Star Awards	Best Actor	The Dream Makers	Nominated	
2014	Star Awards	Favourite Onscreen Couple (Drama)	The Dream Makers	Won (Note: Shared with Jeanette Aw)	
2014	Star Awards	Favourite Onscreen Couple (Drama)	The Dream Makers	Nominated (Note: Shared with Rui En)	
2014	Star Awards	Star Awards for Most Popular Regional Artiste (China)	—N/a	Nominated	
2014	Star Awards	Star Awards for Most Popular Regional Artiste (Indonesia)	—N/a	Nominated	
2014	Star Awards	Star Awards for Most Popular Regional Artiste (Cambodia)	—N/a	Nominated	
2015	Star Awards	Best Actor	C.L.I.F. 3	Nominated	
2015	Star Awards	Star Awards for Most Popular Regional Artiste (China)	—N/a	Nominated	
2015	Star Awards	Star Awards for Most Popular Regional Artiste (Cambodia)	—N/a	Nominated	
2015	Star Awards	Top 10 Most Popular Male Artistes	—N/a	Won	
2015	Star Awards	Favourite Onscreen Couple (Drama)	C.L.I.F. 3	Nominated (Note: Shared with Joanne Peh)	
2016	Star Awards	Best Actor	The Dream Makers II	Won	
2016	Star Awards	All-Time Favourite Artiste	—N/a	Won	
2016	Star Awards	Favourite Onscreen Couple (Drama)	The Dream Makers II	Won (Note: Shared with Jeanette Aw)	
2016	Star Awards	Favourite Onscreen Couple (Drama)	The Dream Makers II	Nominated (Note: Shared with Rui En)	
2018	Star Awards	Bioskin Most Charismatic Artiste Award	—N/a	Nominated	
2019	Star Awards	Best Actor	Mind Matters	Nominated	
2021	Star Awards	Best Actor	A Quest to Heal	Won	
2021	Star Awards	Bioskin Most Charismatic Artiste Award	—N/a	Nominated	
2023	Star Awards	Best Actor	Dark Angel	Nominated	
2023	Star Awards	Favourite Male Show Stealer	Dark Angel	Nominated	
2025	Star Awards	Best Actor	Once Upon A New Year's Eve	Nominated	
2025	Star Awards	The Show Stealer	Once Upon A New Year's Eve	Nominated	
2025	Star Awards	Most Emotional Performance	Once Upon A New Year's Eve	Nominated	
2025	Star Awards	Favourite CP	Once Upon A New Year's Eve	Nominated (Note: Shared with Jesseca Liu)	
