= My Lucky Charm =

- 情来运转
- Genre: Modern Drama
- Created by: Mediacorp Studios
- Starring: Huang Biren; Chew Chor Meng; Chen Hanwei; Jeanette Aw
- Country of origin: Singapore
- Original language: Chinese
- No. of episodes: 25

Production
- Running time: 45 minutes

Original release
- Network: MediaCorp TV Channel 8
- Release: 3 January – 11 February 2005

Related
- Devil's Blues 叛逆战队; You are the One

My Lucky Charm 情来运转 is a 25 episode Chinese drama shown on MediaCorp Channel 8 in Singapore and made its debut on 3 January 2005.

== Cast ==
- Jeanette Aw as Fang Lixiang 方丽香
- Jesseca Liu as Chen Xiuwen 陈秀文
- Huang Biren as Lucky
- Cavin Soh as Chen Qingyun 陈青云
- Chen Hanwei as Chen Jinfa 陈金发
- Chew Chor Meng as Zhang Fenshou 张丰收
- Bukoh Mary as Lisabelle
- Andrew Seow

== Production ==
Hong Kong actor-singer Andy Lau sang the theme song for the drama.

== Accolades ==
Year	Ceremony	Award	Nominee	Result	Ref
2005	Star Awards	Best Actress	Huang Biren	Won	
