= Shaun Chen =

Malaysian actor and businessman (born 1978)

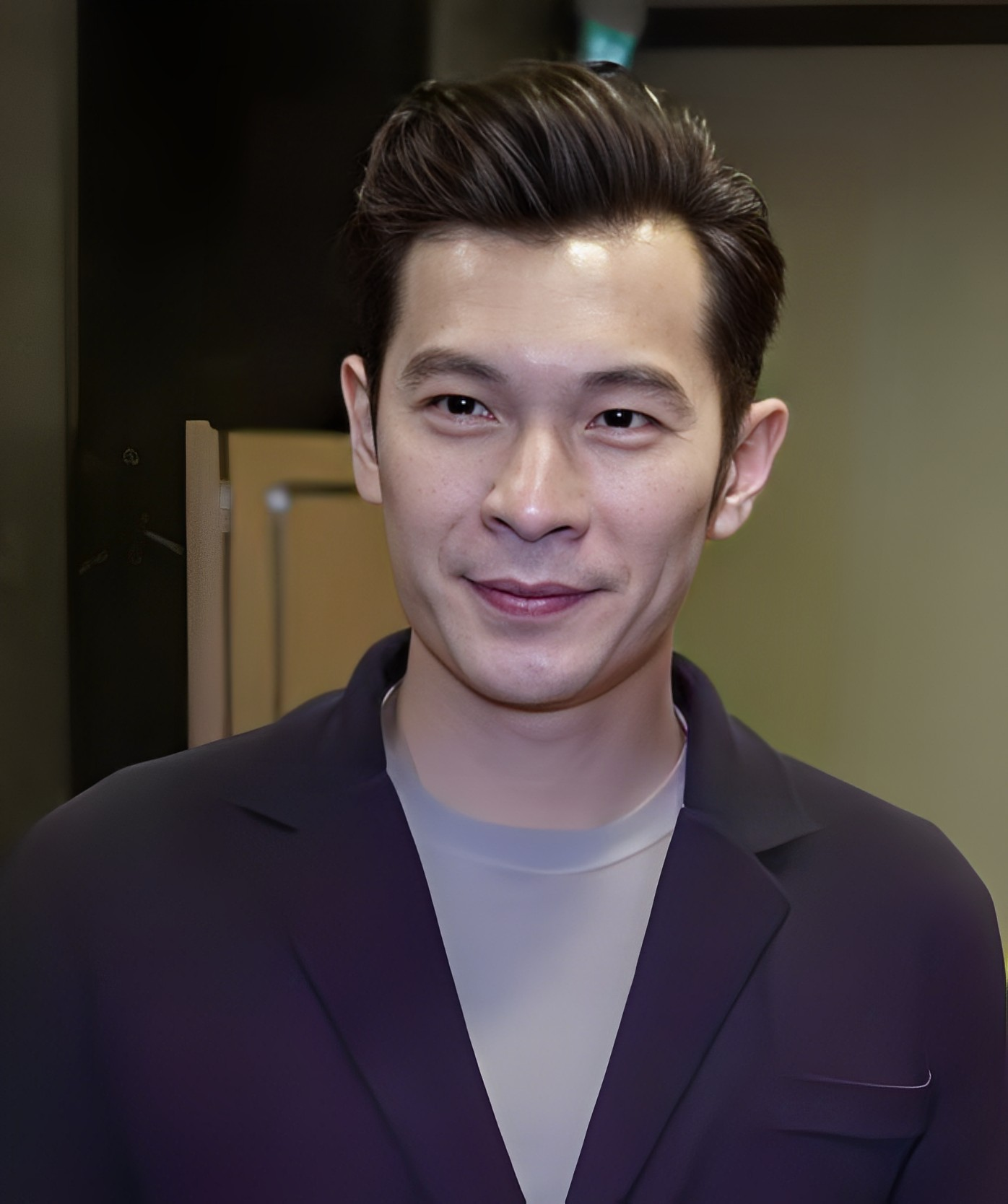
- Chen in May 2017
- Born: 3 November 1978 (age 48); Jelebu, Negeri Sembilan, Malaysia
- Education: SMJK Chan Wa; Institut Teknologi Pertama
- Occupations: Actor; businessman; host; badminton player; model
- Years active: 2003−present
- Spouses: Michelle Chia (m. 2009; div. 2011) Celine Chin (m. 2015)
- Children: 2
- Awards: Full list

Stage name
- Traditional Chinese: 陳泓宇
- Simplified Chinese: 陈泓宇
- Hanyu Pinyin: Chén Hóngyǔ
- Jyutping: Can4 Wang4 Jyu5

Birth name
- Traditional Chinese: 陳節隆
- Simplified Chinese: 陈节隆
- Hanyu Pinyin: Chén Jiélóng

Shaun Chen (born 3 November 1978) is a Malaysian actor and former national badminton player who is based in Singapore. He started as a host for the variety show City Beat alongside Sharon Au, Jeff Wang and Fiona Xie. In 2003, he made his acting debut in True Heroes and Holland V.

Chen rose to stardom when he received three awards at Star Awards 2015, winning the Rocket Award, Best Actor and his first Top 10 Most Popular Male Artistes award.

== Early life and education ==
Chen was born in Jelebu, Negri Sembilan, Malaysia. He is the youngest of seven children.

When Chen was 13, he went to Seremban to study and became a badminton player for the state. Although he tried for the national team, he failed to qualify for it. Chen subsequently earned a diploma in electronic and electrical engineering from a private college.

== Career ==
Prior to coming to Singapore, Chen had worked in many jobs, electrician, car spray-painter, credit card and spectacle salesman model in Malaysia and appeared on billboards for Maxis.

Early in his career Chen was known for playing villains and earned a Best Supporting Actor nomination in the Star Awards 2006 for his role in CID.

In 2011, Chen starred in the top-rated drama serial Love Thy Neighbour.

=== Breakthrough ===
In 2015, Chen won the Best Actor award on his second nomination in the Star Awards 2015 ceremony for his role in The Journey: Tumultuous Times. That same year, he won his first Star Awards for Top 10 Most Popular Male Artistes award as well as the Rocket Award. His multiple wins at Star Awards 2015 propelled him into becoming an A-lister. Since then, Chen has played leading roles in blockbuster productions such as My Friends From Afar and Hero (2016 TV series)

From 2015 to 2019, Chen received five consecutive nominations for Best Actor at the Star Awards.

To date, Chen has gotten eight Top 10 Most Popular Male Artistes, in 2015 and from 2018 to 2024, and in 2026.

== Ventures ==
In July 2023, Chen invested a six-figure sum in The Gold Club, a high-end bar in Orchard Road's The Heeren.

== Personal life ==
Born 陈节隆 (Chén Jiélóng), Chen adopted the stage name 陈泓宇 (Chén Hóngyǔ) when he started out in the entertainment industry in 2003.

Chen married his girlfriend of six years, Michelle Chia, in May 2009. The couple confirmed their divorce on 27 April 2011 but insist they still remain friends.

In July 2015, Chen married his Malaysian girlfriend, Celine Chin. His relationship with Chin was not revealed until October 2015, when he announced that they were going to have a baby. They have two daughters. In November 2025, Chen revealed in his web series Shaun With You about his stages of grief following the death of his 84-year-old father, Tan Po, who was killed in a hit-and-run accident back in March.

In 2026, Chen lodged a complaint towards a Grab deliver rider after the latter flashed the finger towards Chen; the dashcam of his car recorded a video of him and two photos of the incident and was uploaded on his Instagram.

== Filmography ==
=== Television series ===
| Year | Title | Role | Notes | Ref. |
|---|---|---|---|---|
| 2003 | True Heroes | Zhang Hanliang | | |
| 2003 | Holland V | Yu Hongzhi / Xiaoxin | | |
| 2003 | Always on My Mind (无炎的爱) | | | |
| 2005 | Heartlanders IV | James | | |
| 2005 | Yummy Yummy | Wu Shilong | | |
| 2005 | Love Concierge (爱的掌门人) | | | |
| 2006 | C.I.D. | Lin Chenghui | | |
| 2006 | The Beginning (原点) | Fang Yucheng | | |
| 2007 | Let It Shine (萤火虫的梦) | Ma Zikang | | |
| 2007 | Making Miracles (奇迹) | Kelvin | | |
| 2007 | Switched! (幸运星) | Qin Shixuan | | |
| 2007 | Fallen Angel (天使的烙印) | Ye Ziyang | | |
| 2007 | Live Again | Du Xiangyi | | |
| 2008 | The Truth (谜图) | Alex Su | | |
| 2008 | La Femme (绝对佳人) | Liang Xingxiong | | |
| 2008 | Crime Busters x 2 | Jiang Zaixi | | |
| 2009 | The Dream Catchers (未来不是梦) | Jiang Chengfeng | | |
| 2009 | Your Hand in Mine (想握你的手) | Li Liqin | | |
| 2010 | Happy Family (过好年) | Chen Haojie | | |
| 2010 | Unriddle | Luo Zhongxiao | | |
| 2011 | The Seeds of Life (漁米人家) | Luo Shicong | | |
| 2011 | Love Thy Neighbour (四个门牌一个梦) | Ye Meng | | |
| 2011 | Kampong Ties (甘榜情) | Wang Lihai | | |
| 2012 | Game Plan (千方百计) | Zeng Junwei | | |
| 2012 | Beyond X (X元素) | Qiu Hanxiang | | |
| 2012 | Justice in the City (庭外和解) | Qiu Jianzhi | | |
| 2013 | The Dream Makers (志在四方) | Du Zhanpeng | | |
| 2014 | Blessings | Lian Wending | | |
| 2014 | The Journey: Tumultuous Times | Zhang Jia | | |
| 2014 | The Journey: Tumultuous Times | Hu Jia | | |
| 2015 | The Journey: Our Homeland | Zhang Jia | | |
| 2016 | The Dream Job (绝世好工) | Li Junfeng | | |
| 2016 | Hero | Zhou Fada | | |
| 2017 | The Lead (第一主角) | Xie Guanghui | | |
| 2017 | My Alien Girlfriend (我的知星女友) | Yang Tiansheng | | |
| 2017 | My Friends From Afar | Yang Tiansheng | | |
| 2018 | Blessings 2 (祖先保佑2) | Lian Xuegeng | | |
| 2019 | Hello From The Other Side (阴错阳差) | Niu Junyang | | |
| 2019 | While You Were Away (一切从昏睡开始) | He Zijun | | |
| 2019 | After The Stars (攻星计) | Zhang Guoyu | | |
| 2020 | Recipe Of Life (味之道) | Qian Ruofeng | | |
| 2021 | Leave No Soul Behind (21点灵) | Gao Zichen | | |
| 2021 | I Want To Be A Towkay (亲家冤家做头家) | Mr Wu | | |
| 2022 | Healing Heroes (医生不是神) | Zhu Jiacai | | |
| 2023 | Oppa, Saranghae! | Liang Zixuan | | |
| 2023 | My One and Only | Andy Chua | | |
| 2025 | Emerald Hill - The Little Nyonya Story | Zhang Jin Hai | | |

=== Film ===
| Year | Title | Role | Notes | Ref. |
|---|---|---|---|---|
| 2007 | Men in White | Ah Boon | | |
| 2019 | When Ghost Meets Zombie | "Mr Perfect" audition judge | | |
| 2021 | Daddy Day Camp | Niu Haoyi | | |

== Discography ==
=== Compilation album ===
| Year | English title | Mandarin title |
|---|---|---|
| 2017 | MediaCorp Music Lunar New Year Album 17 | 新传媒群星咕鸡咕鸡庆丰年 |
| 2018 | MediaCorp Music Lunar New Year Album 18 | 新传媒群星阿狗狗过好年 |

== Awards and nominations ==
| Organisation | Year | Category | Nominated work | Result | Ref |
|---|---|---|---|---|---|
| Star Awards | 2006 | Best Supporting Actor | C.I.D. (as Li Chenghui) | Nominated | |
| Star Awards | 2007 | Top 10 Most Popular Male Artistes | —N/a | Nominated | |
| Star Awards | 2010 | Top 10 Most Popular Male Artistes | —N/a | Nominated | |
| Star Awards | 2011 | Best Actor | Your Hand In Mine (as Li Liqin) | Nominated | |
| Star Awards | 2011 | Top 10 Most Popular Male Artistes | —N/a | Nominated | |
| Star Awards | 2014 | Best Supporting Actor | The Dream Makers (as Du Zhanpeng) | Nominated | |
| Star Awards | 2014 | Most Popular Regional Artiste (Indonesia) | —N/a | Nominated | |
| Star Awards | 2014 | Most Popular Regional Artiste (Malaysia) | —N/a | Nominated | |
| Star Awards | 2014 | Most Popular Regional Artiste (Cambodia) | —N/a | Nominated | |
| Star Awards | 2015 | Best Actor | The Journey: Tumultuous Times (as Zhang Jia/ Hu Jia) | Won | |
| Star Awards | 2015 | Rocket Award | The Journey: Tumultuous Times (as Zhang Jia/ Hu Jia) | Won | |
| Star Awards | 2015 | Top 10 Most Popular Male Artistes | —N/a | Won | |
| Star Awards | 2015 | London Choco Roll Happiness Award | Blessings (as Lian Wending) | Nominated | |
| Star Awards | 2016 | Best Actor | The Journey: Our Homeland (as Zhang Jia) | Nominated | |
| Star Awards | 2016 | Favourite Onscreen Couple (with Rui En) | The Journey: Our Homeland (as Zhang Jia) | Nominated | |
| Star Awards | 2016 | Top 10 Most Popular Male Artistes | —N/a | Nominated | |
| Star Awards | 2017 | Best Actor | Hero (as Zhou Fada) | Nominated | |
| Star Awards | 2017 | London Choco Roll Happiness Award | Hero (as Zhou Fada) | Nominated | |
| Star Awards | 2017 | Top 10 Most Popular Male Artistes | —N/a | Nominated | |
| Star Awards | 2018 | Best Actor | My Friends From Afar (as Yang Tiansheng) | Nominated | |
| Star Awards | 2018 | Top 10 Most Popular Male Artistes | —N/a | Won | |
| Star Awards | 2019 | Best Actor | Blessings 2 (as Lian Xuegeng) | Nominated | |
| Star Awards | 2019 | Top 10 Most Popular Male Artistes | —N/a | Won | |
| Star Awards | 2021 | Top 10 Most Popular Male Artistes | —N/a | Won | |
| Star Awards | 2022 | Top 10 Most Popular Male Artistes | —N/a | Won | |
| Star Awards | 2023 | Top 10 Most Popular Male Artistes | —N/a | Won | |
| Star Awards | 2024 | Most Hated Villain | My One And Only (as Andy Chua) | Nominated | |
| Star Awards | 2024 | Top 10 Most Popular Male Artistes | —N/a | Won | |
| PPCTV Awards | 2015 | Favorite Supporting Actor | The Dream Makers (as Du Zhanpeng) | Nominated | |
