= Joanne Peh =

Singaporean actress and host (born 1983)

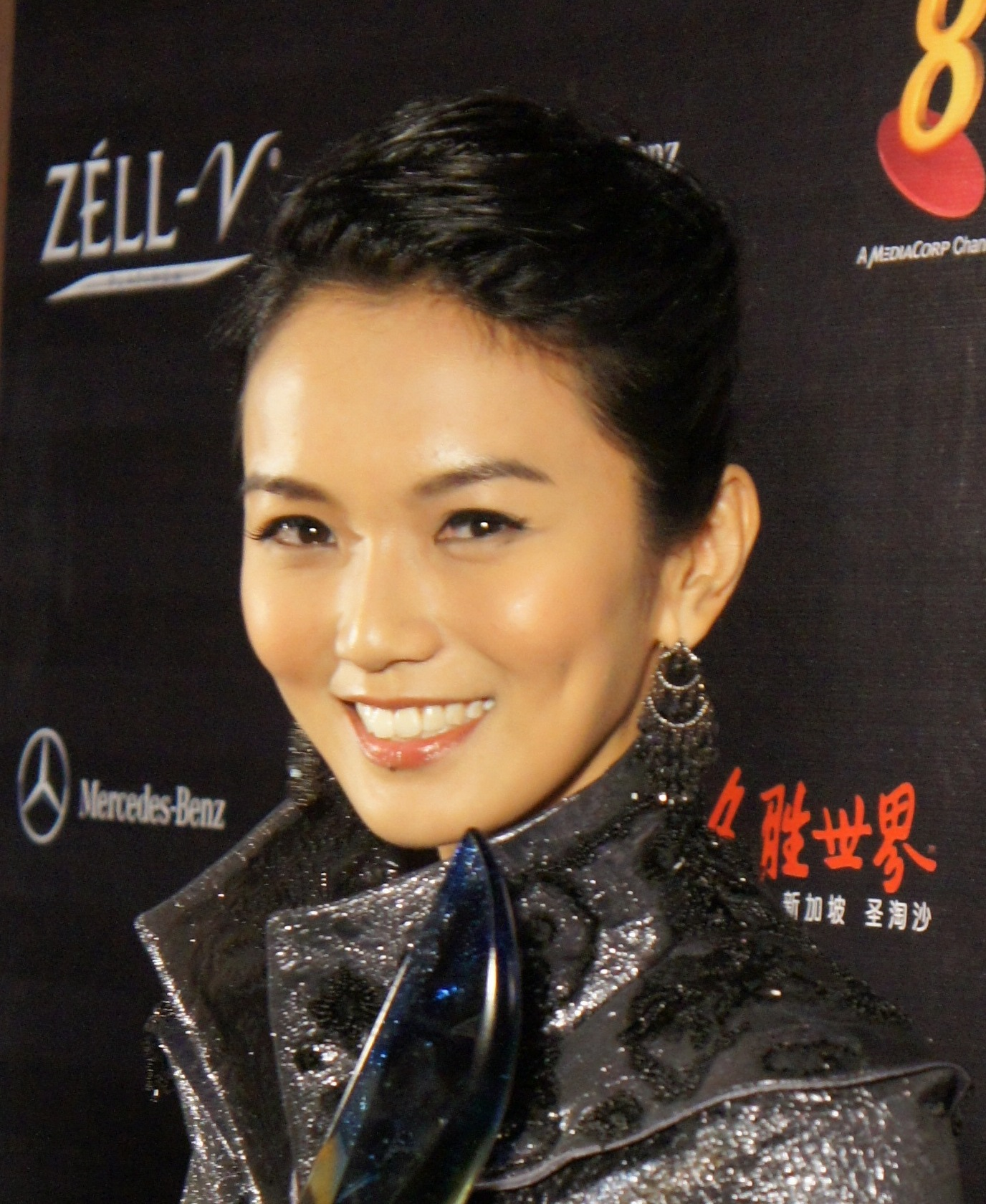
- Peh at the 2011 Star Awards
- Born: 25 April 1983 (age 43); Singapore
- Other name: Bai Wei Xiu
- Education: Temasek Secondary School; Victoria Junior College
- Alma mater: Nanyang Technological University
- Occupations: Actress; host
- Years active: 2002–present
- Spouse: Qi Yuwu (m. 2014)
- Children: 2
- Awards: Full list
- Musical career
- Formerly of: Seven Princesses of Mediacorp

Chinese name
- Traditional Chinese: 白薇秀
- Simplified Chinese: 白薇秀
- Hanyu Pinyin: Bái Wēixiù
- Wade–Giles: Bai^{2} Wei^{1} xiu^{4}
- Jyutping: Baak6 Mei4 Sau3
- Hokkien POJ: Pe̍h Bî-siù
- Website: joannepeh.com

Joanne Peh Wei Siew (born 25 April 1983) is a Singaporean actress and television host. She is married to Chinese actor Qi Yuwu.

== Life and career ==
After winning the title of Miss Elegant and Miss Personality in Miss Singapore Universe 2002, Peh was signed on as an artiste with MediaCorp. Despite having to juggle work and her university studies at the same time, she won both the Most Popular Newcomer award and the Top 10 Most Popular Female Artistes award at the Star Awards 2004, an annual Singaporean award ceremony for TV personalities.

Peh was educated in Temasek Secondary School where she was the head prefect, and also in Victoria Junior College. After graduating with a mass communications degree from Nanyang Technological University, she continued her acting career with the station as a full-time actress.

She earned positive reviews from audiences with her performances in drama serials such as Like Father, Like Daughter, The Golden Path, The Little Nyonya and A Tale of 2 Cities. Her compelling portrayal of Yuzhu, in The Little Nyonya, received rave reviews, as well as a Best Actress award at the Star Awards 2009.

Peh's foray into movies started in 2004, when she acted in Jack Neo's movie The Best Bet. In 2011, she acted in Raintree Pictures' blockbuster It's A Great Great World.

Peh is bilingual. She also a host of variety shows and specials, including President's Star Charity 2005 and The Activist Journey, which won her the Best Info-ed Programme Host Award at Star Awards 2011, edging out veterans like Mark Lee and Bryan Wong for the award.

She won her second Best Actress award at the Star Awards 2012 for her performance as a spoiled girl trying to find love in A Tale of 2 Cities. This is a feat only matched by fellow MediaCorp actress Rui En.

Having beat out veteran actresses like Zoe Tay and Fann Wong, Peh was besieged by reporters after the show, asking how she felt about her win. Peh later revealed in an interview that she broke down and cried after everyone had left.

Peh scored a double nomination at the Star Awards 2015 for her roles as Zhang Hui Niang in The Journey: Tumultuous Times and Assistant Superintendent of Police Leow Xin Yi in C.L.I.F. 3, for which she won the Best Supporting Actress.

Peh has lent her face to advertising campaigns, including Lux and Jetstar.

== Personal life ==
Peh was in a relationship with radio deejay and celebrity Bobby Tonelli for four years, after they met on the set of The Little Nyonya. The couple regularly appeared together on television shows and commercials before their split.

In April 2013, Peh began dating Chinese actor Qi Yuwu. They were married in a private ceremony on 9 September 2014 at the Mövenpick Heritage Hotel Sentosa. On 28 January 2015, the couple announced that they were expecting their first child. On 7 August 2015, she gave birth to a baby girl. On 21 April 2017, she gave birth to her second child, a boy.

Peh has an official fan club called "Jollity Club" which has been running since 2005.

== Filmography ==
=== Television series ===
Year	Title	Role	Notes	Ref.
2002	Beautiful Connection	He Wei		
2004	The Ties That Bind (家财万贯)	Jun Jie		
2004	To Mum With Love (非一般妈妈)	Yu Huan		
2004	I Love My Home (我爱我家)			
2004	The Crime Hunters			
2005	Destiny	Yao Siqi		
2005	A Life of Hope	Fei Fei		
2006	Yours Always (让爱自邮)			
2007	The Golden Path	Kaiqi		
2007	Like Father, Like Daughter	Dai Chunchun		
2007	The Greatest Love of All	Luo Wenxin		
2007	Happily Ever After	Wang Tianqin		
2007	Making Miracles	Li Xiaoman		
2008	The Little Nyonya	Huang Yuzhu		
2008	Beach.Ball.Babes	Liu Xuan / Rainie Liu Feng		
2008	The Truth	Chen Shuxian		
2009	Your Hand in Mine	Wu Youqing		
2009	Your Hand in Mine	Liu Jinlian		
2011	A Song to Remember	Yu Hong		
2011	C.L.I.F.	Liao Xinyi		
2011	A Tale of 2 Cities	Pan Leyao		
2012	Code of Law	Sabrina Wong	Season 1	
2012	Pillow Talk	Zhang Qiuxue		
2012	Keong Saik Street	Rebecca		
2013	The Journey: A Voyage	Zhang Huiniang		
2013	Love at Risk	Xin Sisi		
2013	C.L.I.F. 2	Liao Xinyi		
2014	Code of Law	Sabrina Wong	Season 2	
2014	The Journey: Tumultuous Times	Zhang Huiniang		
2014	C.L.I.F. 3	Liao Xinyi		
2015	Code of Law	Sabrina Wong	Season 3	
2015	Mind Game	Zhao Anni		
2017	Dream Coder	Zhong Yayun		
2018	Heart To Heart (心点心)	Liang Nala		
2018	Say Cheese	Pan Zejia		
2019	Last Madame	Fung Lan		
2021	Mind Jumper (触心罪探)	Qiu Kaile		
2023	Shero	Zhang Yinchen		
2023	Last Madame: Sisters of the Night	—N/a	Narration	

=== Film ===
Year	Title	Role	Notes	Ref.
2004	The Best Bet	Hui Min		
2011	It's a Great, Great World	Mei Juan		
2015	1965	Zhou Jun		

=== Show host ===
Year	Title	Notes	Ref.
2002	PSC Nite'02 (普威之夜)		
2002	City Beat (城人杂志)		
2003	Lunar New Year Special (三羊开泰迎丰年)		
2004	Lunar New Year Special (灵猴献宝贺新春)		
2005	High on Life		
2005	President's Star Charity 2005		
2006	Vesak Day Special (明灯相映真善美)		
2008	Jolly Good Time (佳节年华)		
2009	The Princess & The Prince (当公主遇上王子)		
2009	Fashion Asia – Bangkok (亚洲时尚风 – 曼谷)		
2010	The Activist Journey (仁心侠旅)		
2012	Sasuke Singapore		
2012	Kawaii Style Celebrate 2013 (哈日时尚风)		
2013	President's Star Charity 2013		
2014	President's Star Charity 2014		
2016	Unique Towns (这个乡镇好独特)		
2023	A Conversation with Minister 2023 (空中访民情 2023)		

== Awards and nominations ==
Year	Ceremony	Category	Nominated work	Result	Ref.
2004	Star Awards	Best Newcomer	To Mum With Love	Won	
2004	Star Awards	Top 10 Most Popular Female Artistes	—N/a	Won	
2005	Star Awards	Top 10 Most Popular Female Artistes	—N/a	Won	
2006	Star Awards	Top 10 Most Popular Female Artistes	—N/a	Nominated	
2007	Star Awards	Best Actress	Like Father, Like Daughter (as Dai Chunchun)	Nominated	
2007	Star Awards	Top 10 Most Popular Female Artistes	—N/a	Nominated	
2009	Star Awards	Best Actress	The Little Nyonya (as Huang Yuzhu)	Won	
2009	Star Awards	Top 10 Most Popular Female Artistes	—N/a	Won	
2010	Star Awards	Top 10 Most Popular Female Artistes	—N/a	Won	
2010	Star Awards	Female Media Darling	—N/a	Won	
2011	Star Awards	Best Actress	Your Hand In Mine (as Wu Youqing)	Nominated	
2011	Star Awards	Best Info-ed Programme Host	The Activist's Journey	Won	
2011	Star Awards	Top 10 Most Popular Female Artistes	—N/a	Won	
2011	Star Awards	Favourite Onscreen Couple (Drama)	C.L.I.F. (as Liao Xinyi)	Nominated	
2012	Star Awards	Best Actress	A Tale of 2 Cities (as Pan Leyao)	Won	
2012	Star Awards	Top 10 Most Popular Female Artistes	—N/a	Won	
2012	Asian Television Awards	Best Actress in a Leading Role	A Song To Remember (as Yu Hong)	Nominated	
2013	Star Awards	Best Actress	Pillow Talk (as Zhang Qiuxue)	Nominated	
2013	Star Awards	Top 10 Most Popular Female Artistes	—N/a	Won	
2014	Star Awards	Top 10 Most Popular Female Artistes	—N/a	Won	
2014	Star Awards	Favourite Female Character	The Journey: A Voyage (as Zheng Huiniang)	Nominated	
2014	Star Awards	Star Awards for Most Popular Regional Artiste (China)	—N/a	Nominated	
2014	Star Awards	Star Awards for Most Popular Regional Artiste (Malaysia)	—N/a	Nominated	
2014	Star Awards	Star Awards for Most Popular Regional Artiste (Indonesia)	—N/a	Nominated	
2014	Star Awards	Star Awards for Most Popular Regional Artiste (Cambodia)	—N/a	Nominated	
2015	Star Awards	Best Actress	C.L.I.F. 3 (as Liao Xinyi)	Nominated	
2015	Star Awards	Top 10 Most Popular Female Artistes	—N/a	Won	
2015	Star Awards	Best Supporting Actress	The Journey: Tumultuous Times (as Zheng Huiniang)	Won	
2015	Star Awards	Favourite Onscreen Couple (Drama)	C.L.I.F. 3 (as Liao Xinyi)	Nominated	
2015	Star Awards	Star Awards for Most Popular Regional Artiste (China)	—N/a	Nominated	
2015	Star Awards	Star Awards for Most Popular Regional Artiste (Malaysia)	—N/a	Nominated	
2015	Star Awards	Star Awards for Most Popular Regional Artiste (Indonesia)	—N/a	Nominated	
2015	Star Awards	Star Awards for Most Popular Regional Artiste (Cambodia)	—N/a	Nominated	
2015	Asian Television Awards	Best Actress in a Supporting Role	The Journey: Tumultuous Times (as Zheng Huiniang)	Nominated	
2016	Star Awards	Top 10 Most Popular Female Artistes	—N/a	Won	
2017	Star Awards	All-Time Favourite Artiste	—N/a	Won	
2019	Star Awards	Best Actress	Say Cheese (as Pan Zejia)	Nominated	
2020	Asian Television Awards	Best Leading Female Performance - Digital	Last Madame (as Fung Lang)	Won	
2020	Asian Television Awards	Best Actress in a Leading Role	Last Madame (as Fung Lang)	Nominated	
2021	Asian Television Awards	Best Leading Female Performance - Digital	Mind Jumper (as Qiu Kaile)	Won	
2021	Asian Television Awards	Best Actress in a Leading Role	Mind Jumper (as Qiu Kaile)	Nominated	
2022	Star Awards	Best Actress	Mind Jumper (as Khoo Kaile)	Nominated	
2022	Star Awards	Favourite Female Show Stealer	Mind Jumper (as Khoo Kaile)	Nominated	
2024	Star Awards	Best Actress	Shero (as Zhang Yinchen)	Nominated	
2025	Star Awards	Best Programme Host (Entertainment & Infotainment)	A Conversation with Minister	Nominated	
