= I'm in Charge =

- 小子当家
- Story by: Ang Eng Tee 洪荣狄
- Directed by: Png Keh Hock 方傢福
- Starring: Sheila Sim; Elvin Ng; Aloysius Pang; Carole Lin; Rayson Tan
- Opening theme: 要你好看 by Ric Liu
- Ending theme: 橄榄树 （男生版）by Ric Liu 橄榄树 （女生版）by Wei En
- Country of origin: Singapore
- Original language: Chinese
- No. of series: 1
- No. of episodes: 20

Production
- Producer: Chong Liung Man 张龙敏
- Running time: approx. 45 minutes

Original release
- Network: MediaCorp Channel 8 (2013); Channel U (2016)
- Release: 27 May – 21 June 2013

Related
- 96°C Café; The Dream Makers; It Takes Two; World at Your Feet; The Gentlemen; Super Senior; My Teacher Is a Thug

I'm In Charge (Chinese: 小子当家) is a Chinese drama serial that is shown on weekdays at 9pm on MediaCorp Channel 8. It airs from 27 May to 21 June 2013. It stars Sheila Sim, Elvin Ng, Aloysius Pang, Carole Lin and Rayson Tan as the casts of the series.

== Plot ==
This is a 20-episode drama-series about a youth who has to shoulder the responsibility of being the man of the house while his mother is hospitalised. Not only does the boy have to support the family, he must also bear the responsibility of looking after his two younger sisters (one aged 14 and the other aged 12). The story underscores the value of familial love and the need for young people to be independent and to have a sense of responsibility.

Wang Jiahao (Aloysius Pang) is a rebellious youth whose bad name causes him to be blacklisted by schools. In spite of that, his mother, Xiufen (Carole Lin) does not give up hope on him. She works hard at two jobs just to admit him into a private school. But Jiahao does not appreciate his mother’s effort at all, living aimlessly day by day, with scant regard for his future until one day, his mother meets with an accident and lies unconscious in hospital indefinitely. Only then does Jiahao realise that he has to assume the heavy responsibility of being the “head of the family”.

Xiufen, while fending off a thief’s attempt to snatch her hard-earned $1000, is pushed down (by a thief) onto a hard pillar. Despite losing consciousness upon hitting her head and bleeding profusely, she still clutches onto her purse. Jiahao knows that the $1000 is meant for him; he had made an empty threat to leave home if Xiufen had refused to give him $1000 to buy a new computer. Staring at his unconscious mother, Jiahao has never felt so remorseful. He promises Xiufen to take good care of his two younger sisters so that she will see a complete family upon regaining consciousness.

Jiahao has a 14-year-old sister, Wang Jiemin (Fang Rong) who is as rebellious as him, and an extremely mischievous but witty 12-year-old sister, Jieshan (Oh Ling En). He quickly feels the helplessness of managing the family and his two siblings - he does not even know how to boil water. The two rascals are simply too disobedient to him. And that's not the end - with the bad financial condition in the family after a housebreaker steals all the remaining money, Jiahao has to make ends meet.

Fortunately, Jiahao has a warm and motherly paternal aunt, Wang Xiaohui (Sheila Sim). She volunteers to move in with the children and claims that she will take “good” care of them. However, this aunt is a scatterbrain. She is eager to help but always messes things up. Not only does Xiaohui cook a meal that tastes awful, she almost causes the whole family to die of gas poisoning.

Jiahao has no choice but to “head the family”. He has to see to everything – from doing the basic of preparing three meals a day to washing the laundry, clearing the choked toilet bowl, emptying the rubbish, buying toilet paper, trimming his sister's hair, meeting the teachers, etc. As if this string of duties is not enough, he also has to find time to visit his eccentric maternal grandfather. Only then does it dawn on him that his mother had been a “superwoman”, a multi-tasker; her children do nothing but rely on Xiufen for food and money. He finally understands his mother’s pains of looking after them.

Xiufen has left little money for them. Auntie cannot even pay her mountain of credit card debts, let alone help them financially. Jiahao has no choice but to work during his school vacation. While working at a restaurant in a swimming club, he is mesmerised by a pretty girl in swimwear.

The girl is Jiang Haiying (Elizabeth Lee), a sweet girl with a fantastic figure. In the water, she is like a mermaid. Out of the water, she is bubbly and cheerful. But she is a top student of a prestigious school, and a swimming captain to boot. Her father is a well-known lawyer. He is nothing compared to her. Moreover, Jiahao has a secret - he has a phobia of entering a pool as a result of a childhood incident where he nearly drowned. This is his secret that cannot be revealed, yet the girl he is fond of is a “mermaid”. Jiahao has the courage only to enjoy watching her in stealth but not to take any action. One day, Jiahao happens to see Haiying struggling in the water due to a leg cramp. Seeing that nobody else is in sight, he jumps into the pool to save her without considering his own safety. Unfortunately, Haiying ends up saving him instead. It is “a blessing in disguise”, and Jiahao befriends Haiying. He also finds out that like him, Haiying has “a secret that cannot be revealed”.

On the home front, Jiahao is in a fix. Jiemin wants to wear a nose stud. He opposes it vehemently for fear that Xiufen will wake up to see Jiemin turned into a young punk. JIemin's response that “Mother may never wake up again!” incurs his wrath. After retorting that “You have never behaved like an elder brother”, she leaves home.

In the midst of facing a deluge of problems, his maternal uncle Ah Wei (Elvin Ng) appears at the flat. He is homeless after being released from prison. Xiaohui is afraid that Ah Wei, with his secret society background, will lead Jiahao astray. She is determined to stop Ah Wei from moving in but the thick-skinned latter refuses to leave. In a quick change of heart, Xiaohui also moves in to set herself against Ah Wei. Both parties are hostile to each other and are often at loggerheads. Sandwiched between them, Jiahao can only agonise. Around this time, a man claiming to be their future father appears out of nowhere, making this messy family even more “exciting”.

Jiahao tries his best to overcome the various obstacles. His efforts are not futile in the end. He succeeds as “head of the family”, and in “pairing up” Ah Wei and Xiaohui. His mother awakens to see her son changed for the better and a family full of warmth.

== Cast ==
- Elvin Ng as Liu Guowei 刘国威
- Sheila Sim as Wang Xiaohui 王小慧 or Chili Padi
- Aloysius Pang as Wang Jiahao 王家豪
- Fang Rong as Wang Jiemin 王洁敏
- Oh Ling En as Wang Jieshan 王洁珊
- Elizabeth Lee as Jiang Haiying 江海瑛
- Rayson Tan as Director Yang 杨大导
- Hao Hao as Lin Chunfeng 林春风
- Darryl Yong as Albert Chang
- Carole Lin as Liu Xiufen 刘秀芬
- Eric Lee as Lollipop
- Jasper Chua as Otahman
- Melody Low as Coco
- Charles Phua as Benson Lee
- Li Wenhai as Niu Pi Gu 牛霹辜
- Chua Enlai as Matino

== Episodes ==
No.	Title	Original release date
1	"Episode 1"	May 27, 2013
2	"Episode 2"	May 28, 2013
3	"Episode 3"	May 29, 2013
4	"Episode 4"	May 30, 2013
5	"Episode 5"	May 31, 2013
6	"Episode 6"	June 3, 2013
7	"Episode 7"	June 4, 2013
8	"Episode 8"	June 5, 2013
9	"Episode 9"	June 6, 2013
10	"Episode 10"	June 7, 2013
11	"Episode 11"	June 10, 2013
12	"Episode 12"	June 11, 2013
13	"Episode 13"	June 12, 2013
14	"Episode 14"	June 13, 2013
15	"Episode 15"	June 14, 2013
16	"Episode 16"	June 17, 2013
17	"Episode 17"	June 18, 2013
18	"Episode 18"	June 19, 2013
19	"Episode 19"	June 20, 2013
20	"Episode 20"	June 21, 2013

== International broadcast ==
This drama is tenth drama on Malaysian satellite television Astro to be broadcast concurrently with Singapore, two weeks' behind the original telecast.

Country of Broadcast	Broadcasting Network	Premiere	Finale	Preceded by	Followed by
Malaysia	Astro Shuang Xing	13 June 2013 at 4.30pm, weekdays (encore on 14 March at 3.30pm, weekdays)	10 July 2013 (encore on 11 July)	The Enchanted	The Dream Makers

== Awards and nominations ==
=== Star Awards 2014 ===
I'm in Charge garnered 2 nominations for 3 awards in the Star Awards, for the Young Talent Award, Favourite Male Character.

Nominee / Work	Award	Accolade	Result
Lyn Oh Ling En 胡菱恩	Star Awards 20 Show 1 红星大奖20	Young Talent Award 青苹果奖	Won
Aloysius Pang 冯伟衷	Star Awards 20 Show 1 红星大奖20	Favourite Male Character 最喜爱男角色	Nominated
Elvin Ng 黄俊雄	Star Awards 20 Show 1 红星大奖20	Favourite Male Character 最喜爱男角色	Won

== See also ==
- List of programmes broadcast by Mediacorp Channel 8
