= Star Awards for Favourite Male Show Stealer =

Singaporean television award (2010–2023)

Star Awards for Favourite Male Show Stealer 最喜爱男角色
- Current: Star Awards 2024
- Awarded for: Most Popular Drama Series or Variety Character by an Actor
- Country: Singapore
- Presented by: Mediacorp
- First award: 2010
- Currently held by: Vacant

The Star Awards for Favourite Male Show Stealer was an award presented annually at the Star Awards. It was given to an actor who portrayed a drama series or variety character that was deemed the most popular among the television audience.

It was first presented in 2010, discontinued in 2017, and then revived in 2022 and 2023.

== History ==
The Star Awards for Favourite Male Character category was introduced in 2010, at the 16th Star Awards ceremony; Nat Ho received the award for his role in The Dream Catchers.

Prior to 2012, the nominees were determined by a team of judges employed by Mediacorp. The rule was removed in 2012 to allow the public to determine the nominees entirely via online voting. Winners are selected by a majority vote from the public.

The award was discontinued from 2017, along with the Favourite Female Character and Favourite Onscreen Couple (Drama) awards. In 2022, the award was revived but came under a new name called Favourite Male Show Stealer.

Since its inception, the award was given to five actors. Richie Koh is the most recent winner in this category for his role in Your World In Mine. Elvin Ng and Xu Bin have won this category thrice with Xu receiving six nominations, more than any other actor. Aloysius Pang and Romeo Tan hold the record for the most nominations without a win, with four.

== Recipients ==
| Year | Actor | Role (title) | Nominees | Ref |
Favourite Male Character
| 2010 | Nat Ho | Lin Jiajie 林佳杰 (The Dream Catchers ) | Dennis Chew — Foreigner 老外 (Paris and Milan ); Dai Xiangyu — Lin Xiaobei 林小杯 (Together); Huang Wenyong — Bao Zugong 包租公 (The A-Go-Go Princess ); Elvin Ng — Huang Zhihao 黄志豪 (Together); Thomas Ong — Alex Tan (Perfect Cut 2); Tay Ping Hui — Li Jiacheng 李家成 (Baby Bonus ); Lawrence Wong — Chen Wenyuan 陈文远 (The Promise ); Ben Yeo — Thrift King 猫王 (King of Thrift 3 ); Jerry Yeo — Ye Rende 叶仁德 (The Ultimatum ) | |
| 2011 | Elvin Ng | Zou Jieming 邹杰明 (Breakout) | Chen Hanwei — Wu Fu 五福 (The Best Things in Life ); Guo Liang — Zhang Fei 张非 (Black Rose ); Thomas Ong — James Lee (The Illusionist ); Qi Yuwu — Lin Leshan 林乐山 (The Family Court ) | |
| 2012 | Elvin Ng | Zhang Guixiang (C.L.I.F. ) | Ian Fang — Jason (On the Fringe ); Edwin Goh — Yao Zhiyong 姚志勇 (On the Fringe ); Christopher Lee — Wu Guo En 吴国恩 (The Oath ); Tay Ping Hui — Xie Donghai 谢东海 (Bountiful Blessings ) | |
| 2013 | Xu Bin | Zhong Junliang 钟俊良 (Don't Stop Believin' ) | Alien Huang — Zhao Mingxing 赵明星 (Joys of Life ); Christopher Lee — Zeng Haoren 曾浩仁 (Game Plan ); Aloysius Pang — Hao Zhijie 郝志杰 (It Takes Two ); Romeo Tan — Fish Prince 鱼王子 (It Takes Two ) | |
| 2014 | Elvin Ng | Liu Guowei 刘国威 (I'm in Charge ) | Aloysius Pang — Wang Jiahao 王家豪 (I'm in Charge ); Desmond Tan — Hong Shi 洪石 (The Journey: A Voyage); Romeo Tan — Hong Khee Leong 方启亮 (Sudden ); Xu Bin — Yang Yuanshuai Oscar 杨元帅 (Gonna Make It ) | |
| 2015 | Zhang Zhenxuan | Gao Guotian 高过天 (World at Your Feet) | Elvin Ng — Wu Weixiong 吴伟雄 (World at Your Feet); Aloysius Pang — Fang Yangming 方扬名 (World at Your Feet); Romeo Tan — Zhang Yan 张晏 (The Journey: Tumultuous Times ); Xu Bin — Guo Jingcheng 郭精诚 (Against the Tide ) | |
| 2016 | Xu Bin | Fu Jiaren 傅家任 (You Can Be an Angel Too) | Christopher Lee — Yang Yiwei 杨毅伟 (Crescendo); Aloysius Pang — Ang Bee Ghee 洪美志 (Hand In Hand ); Romeo Tan — Zhang Yan 张晏 / Hong Kuan 洪宽 (The Journey: Our Homeland); Zhang Zhenxuan — Zheng Danle 郑丹乐 (Sealed with a Kiss ) | |
Favourite Male Show Stealer
| 2022 | Xu Bin | Chung Sheejie 钟世杰 (My Star Bride) | Desmond Tan - (Key Witness) as Chen Zhiming 陈志明; Glenn Yong - (Live Your Dreams) as Sun Yian 孙易安; Jeremy Chan - (Crouching Tiger Hidden Ghost) as Ma Da 马达; Richie Koh - (Live Your Dreams) as Zhu Yongjie 朱勇杰 | |
| 2023 | Richie Koh | Zheng Tiancai 郑天才 (Your World In Mine ) | James Seah - (Soul Detective) as Bai Ye; Jeremy Chan - (Soul Detective) as Feng Kangkai 冯慷楷/4896; Xu Bin - (Love At First Bite) as Martius Shen Mingxing 沈明星; Qi Yuwu - (Dark Angel) as Zhu Wei 朱玮 | |

== Multiple awards and nominations ==
The following individuals received two or more Favourite Male Character/Male Show Stealer awards:

| Wins | Actor | Nominations |
|---|---|---|
| 3 | Elvin Ng | 5 |
| 3 | Xu Bin | 6 |

The following individuals received two or more Favourite Male Character/Male Show Stealer nominations:

| Nominations | Actor |
|---|---|
| 6 | Xu Bin |
| 5 | Elvin Ng |
| 4 | Aloysius Pang |
| 4 | Romeo Tan |
| 3 | Christopher Lee |
| 2 | Zhang Zhenxuan |
| 2 | Thomas Ong |
| 2 | Tay Ping Hui |
| 2 | Qi Yuwu |
| 2 | Desmond Tan |
| 2 | Jeremy Chan |
| 2 | Richie Koh |
