= The Best Things in Life =

- 五福到
- Written by: Ang Eng Tee 洪荣狄
- Starring: Chen Hanwei; Cynthia Koh; Tracy Lee; Terence Cao; Zhang Yaodong; Ya Hui; Phyllis Quek; Ong Ai Leng; Darren Lim; Desmond Tan
- Opening theme: 知足 by Cavin Soh
- Ending theme: 轻轻 by Teresa Tseng
- Original language: Chinese
- No. of episodes: 20

Production
- Producer: Winnie Wong 王尤红
- Running time: approx. 45 minutes

Original release
- Network: MediaCorp TV Channel 8
- Release: 17 March – 13 April 2010

The Best Things in Life (五福到) is a Singaporean drama which aired on Channel 8. It stars Chen Hanwei, Cynthia Koh, Tracy Lee, Terence Cao, Zhang Yaodong, Ya Hui, Phyllis Quek, Ong Ai Leng, Darren Lim & Desmond Tan as the casts if the series. It debuted on 17 March 2010 and consists of 20 episodes.

== Plot ==
Chen Wufu is an orphan. He was adopted by a kind fisherman and his wife who have three daughters. Their daughters left for Singapore to work and subsequently married and settled in the city, leaving Wufu to care for his parents. Wufu is a kind-hearted man with simple needs, but his parents urged him to leave for the city to eke out his own living. His naive and trusting ways leads to many hilarious situations when he arrives in the city.

Wu Fu’s eldest sister, Chen Jiaxin, holds three jobs to maximize her earning potential. When she loses her money in the stock market, she blames second sister Chen Jiayi who encourages her to invest. Wu Fu’s attempts to mediate only make matters worse, Jiaxin falls out with her husband, Jiayi’s wedding is nearly ruined, and youngest sister Chen Jiahui’s career and love life also takes a hit from his meddling.

The three sisters are furious and try to get rid of him, but eventually, Wufu’s sincerity and steadfastness touches them. This comedy drama shows the importance of family ties and tugs the heart-string with its touching story.

== Cast ==
- Chen Hanwei as Chen Wufu (陈五福)
- Cynthia Koh as Chen Jiaxin (陈家欣)
- Tracy Lee as Chen Jiayi (陈家宜)
- Ya Hui as Chen Jiahui (陈家慧)
- Terence Cao as Song Daming (宋达明)
- Zhang Yaodong as Bai Chuanyi (白传一)
- Darren Lim as Luo Jianguo (罗建国)
- Ong Ai Leng as Ah Zhu (阿珠)
- Phyllis Quek as Dream
- Desmond Tan as Beethoven
- Romeo Tan as Dream's younger brother
- May Phua

== Reception ==
Average viewership for each episode is 874,000.

=== Accolades ===
Organisation	Year	Category	Nominee(s)	Result	Ref.
Star Awards	2011	Best Director	Leong Lye Lin 梁来玲	Nominated	
Star Awards	2011	Young Talent Award	Grace Ng Xin Yi 黄馨仪	Nominated	
Star Awards	2011	Best Theme Song	"知足"	Nominated	
Star Awards	2011	Best Supporting Actor	Terence Cao	Won	
Star Awards	2011	Favourite Male Character	Chen Hanwei	Nominated	
