= Pamelyn =

Pamelyn is a given name. Notable people with the name include:

- Pamelyn Chee, Singaporean actress and host
- Pamelyn Ferdin (born 1959), American actress and animal rights activist
