= Star Awards for Favourite Onscreen Couple (Drama) =

Singaporean television award (2011–2016)

Star Awards for Favourite Onscreen Couple (Drama) 最喜爱荧幕情侣
- Current: Star Awards 2025
- Awarded for: Most Popular Drama Series Couple by an Actor and Actress
- Country: Singapore
- Presented by: Mediacorp
- First award: 2011
- Final award: 2016
- Last awarded: Qi Yuwu and Jeanette Aw (as Jason Lam 蓝钦辉 and Zhao Fei'er 赵非儿 in The Dream Makers II)

The Star Awards for Favourite Onscreen Couple (Drama) was an award presented annually at the Star Awards, a ceremony that was established in 1994. The awards are awarded for the most popular drama series couple by an actor and actress. It was last awarded in 2016 to Qi Yuwu
and Jeanette Aw for their roles as Jason Lam 蓝钦辉 and Zhao Fei'er 赵非儿 in The Dream Makers II.

== History ==
The category was introduced in 2011, at the 17th Star Awards ceremony; Christopher Lee and Jeanette Aw received the award for their roles in Breakout and it is given in honour of a pair of artistes–one actor and one actress (not necessary to be contracted under Mediacorp)–who portrayed a drama series couple that is deemed the most popular among the television audience. In 2011, the nominees were determined by a team of judges employed by Mediacorp. The rule was removed in 2012 to allow the public to determine the nominees entirely via online voting. Winners are also selected by a majority vote from the public via online voting as well.

Since its inception, the award was given to four onscreen couples – four different actors and two different actresses. Desmond Tan and Chantalle Ng are the most recent and final winners in this category for their roles in All That Glitters. Elvin Ng and Rui En; Qi and Aw; and Xu and Ng are the onscreen couples to win in this category twice. In addition, Lee and Jesseca Liu; Li Nanxing and Rui En; Ng and Rui En; Qi and Aw; Qi and Joanne Peh; Qi and Rui En; Xu and Ng have been nominated on two occasions, more than any other onscreen couple.

For the actors who were nominated in this category, Ng, Qi and Xu Bin are the only actors to win in this category twice. In addition, Qi has been nominated on six occasions, more than any other actor. Li holds the record for the most nominations without a win, with three.

For the actresses who were nominated in this category, Aw is the only actress to win in this category four times, surpassing Ng who has three wins. Rui En has been nominated on 13 occasions, more than any other actress. Ann Kok, Liu, Peh, Julie Tan, and Zhou Ying hold the record for the most nominations without a win, with two.

== Recipients ==
| Year | Onscreen couple | Roles (title) | Nominees | Ref. |
|---|---|---|---|---|
| 2011 | Christopher Lee and Jeanette Aw | Situ Dongcheng 司徒东城 and Yang Nianqing 杨念青 (Breakout) | Chen Hanwei and Rui En — Zhang Yang 张扬 and Ye Siqi 叶思琪 (With You); Elvin Ng and Zhou Ying — Zou Jieming 邹杰明 and Tang Ying 汤颖 (Breakout); Tay Ping Hui and Tong Bingyu — Shen Xiping 沈希平 and Huang Shuya 黄舒雅 (The Family Court); Yao Wenlong and Cynthia Koh — Chen Weizhong 陈伟中 and Yun Feixue 云飞雪 (Mrs P.I.) | |
| 2012 | Elvin Ng and Rui En | Song Yazai 宋亚仔 and Ou Kelu 欧可璐 (Code of Honour) | Christopher Lee and Jesseca Liu — Wu Guo En 吴国恩 and Yang Minfei 杨敏妃 (The Oath ); Li Nanxing and Fann Wong — Tian Yibang 田一邦 and Liu Jiali 刘佳丽 (On the Fringe); Pierre Png and Rui En — Xiao Jianhai 萧建海 and Wang Jiazhen 王佳珍 (The In-Laws); Qi Yuwu and Joanne Peh — Tang Yew Jia 唐耀佳 and Leow Xin Yi 廖心怡 (C.L.I.F.) | |
| 2013 | Elvin Ng and Rui En | Xie Langfeng 谢郎峰 and Hu Xiaoman 胡小曼 (Unriddle 2) | Dai Xiangyu and Zhou Ying — Bai Jinhai 白金海 and Huang Qiumei 黄秋妹 (The Quarters ); Alien Huang and Rui En — Zhao Mingxing 赵明星 and Han Yongyong 韩咏咏 (Joys of Life); Christopher Lee and Jesseca Liu — Zeng Haoren 曾浩仁 and Zhao Xintong 赵欣彤 (Game Plan); Zheng Geping and Ann Kok — Hao Youfu 郝有福 and Vivian (It Takes Two) | |
| 2014 | Qi Yuwu and Jeanette Aw | Jason Lam 蓝钦辉 and Zhao Fei'er 赵非儿 (The Dream Makers) | Li Nanxing and Rui En — Wee Lum Thiam 魏蓝天 and Ng Tze Keat 黄芷婕 (C.L.I.F. 2); Qi Yuwu and Rui En — Jason Lam 蓝钦辉 and Fang Tonglin 方彤琳 (The Dream Makers); Romeo Tan and Rui En — Hong Khee Leong 方启亮 and Ching Cho Ning 程楚宁 (Sudden ); Xu Bin and Julie Tan — Yang Yuanshuai Oscar 杨元帅 and Su Xiaoxiao 苏小小 (Gonna Make It) | |
| 2015 | Zhang Zhenxuan and Jeanette Aw | Gao Guotian 高过天 and Mo Yuqing 莫雨晴 (World at Your Feet ) | Ian Fang and Kimberly Chia — Hong Dehai 洪德海 and Ye Xiaofeng 叶晓枫 (World at Your Feet); Li Nanxing and Rui En — Wee Lam Tian 魏蓝天 and Ng Tze Keat 黄芷婕 (C.L.I.F. 3); Qi Yuwu and Joanne Peh — Tang Yew Jia 唐耀佳 and Leow Xin Yi 廖心怡 (C.L.I.F. 3); Romeo Tan and Rebecca Lim — Liu Junwei 刘骏卫 and Zhang Xueqin 张雪芹 (Yes We Can!) | |
| 2016 | Qi Yuwu and Jeanette Aw | Jason Lam 蓝钦辉 and Zhao Fei'er 赵非儿 (The Dream Makers II) | Shaun Chen and Rui En — Zhang Jia 张佳 and Yang Meixue 杨美雪 (The Journey: Our Homeland); Qi Yuwu and Rui En — Jason Lam 蓝钦辉 and Fang Tonglin 方彤琳 (The Dream Makers II); Tay Ping Hui and Ann Kok — Jiang Chufan 江楚帆 and Deng Xueli 邓雪莉 (Crescendo ); Zhang Zhenxuan and Julie Tan — Chen Guang 陈光 and Dong Zihuai 董子怀 (The Dream Makers II) | |

^{^[I]} Each year is linked to the article about the Star Awards held that year.

== Superlatives ==
Most Wins

| Wins | Couple |
|---|---|
| 2 | Elvin Ng and Rui En; Qi Yuwu and Jeanette Aw |

| Wins | Actor |
|---|---|
| 2 | Elvin Ng; Qi Yuwu |

| Wins | Actress |
|---|---|
| 4 | Jeanette Aw |
| 2 | Rui En |

Most nominations

| Nominations | Couple |
|---|---|
| 2 | Christopher Lee and Jesseca Liu; Elvin Ng and Rui En; Qi Yuwu and Jeanette Aw; Qi Yuwu and Joanne Peh; Qi Yuwu and Rui En; Li Nanxing and Rui En |

| Nominations | Actor |
|---|---|
| 3 | Elvin Ng; Christopher Lee; Li Nanxing |
| 2 | Romeo Tan; Tay Ping Hui; Zhang Zhenxuan; Qi Yuwu |

| Nominations | Actress |
|---|---|
| 11 | Rui En |
| 4 | Jeanette Aw |
| 2 | Jesseca Liu; Joanne Peh; Zhou Ying; Ann Kok; Julie Tan |
