= Beyond (Singaporean TV series) =

2012 TV series

- X 元素
- Genre: Mystery; Science fiction
- Written by: Phang Kai Yee 彭凯毅
- Directed by: Chia Mien Yang 谢敏洋; Chen Yi You 陈忆幼; Lin Mingzhe 林明哲
- Starring: Jeanette Aw; Pierre Png; Li Nanxing; Xiang Yun; Shaun Chen
- Opening theme: 呼吸 by Mary Wong
- Country of origin: Singapore
- Original language: Chinese
- No. of episodes: 20

Production
- Producer: Chia Mien Yang 谢敏洋
- Running time: approx. 45 minutes

Original release
- Network: MediaCorp Channel 8
- Release: 24 December 2012 – 18 January 2013

Beyond
- Traditional Chinese: X元素
- Simplified Chinese: X元素
Transcriptions
Standard Mandarin
- Hanyu Pinyin: X Yuán Sù

Beyond (Chinese: X元素) is a Singaporean Chinese drama which has been telecasted on Singapore's free-to-air channel, MediaCorp Channel 8. It stars Jeanette Aw, Pierre Png, Li Nanxing, Xiang Yun and Shaun Chen as the casts of the series. It made its debut on 24 Dec 2012. This drama serial consists of 20 episodes, and was screened on every weekday night at 9:00 pm, it is a year end blockbuster for 2012.

The series is the sixth highest-rated drama serial in 2013, with an average viewership of 834,000.

== Plot ==
Welcome to the realm of the unexplained, where things are not exactly what they seem and where one can get sucked into an alternative reality or a different dimension.

Jeanette Aw plays the protagonist gifted with the extraordinary ability to see a person as they are inside. Together with Li Nan Xing, who plays an eccentric private investigator in search of his missing fiancée, the duo brave challenges as they seek to unravel mysteries of the unknown dimensions.

The intriguing investigative drama also stars Pierre Png as the psychiatrist with charisma, Shaun Chen and Xiang Yun. Each case covers three to four thrilling episodes.

== Cast ==
=== Main cast ===
| Cast | Role | Description |
|---|---|---|
| Jeanette Aw | Yang Zhiqing 杨芷晴 | 傻妹 (Silly girl); Cuiyan's daughter Love interest of Wenbin, but she is interested in Jiang Wei |
| Pierre Png | Xu Wenbin 许文斌 | Psychiatrist; Zhiqing's best friend In love with Zhiqing |
| Li Nanxing | Jiang Wei 江伟 | Private detective (former police officer); Meichen's fiancée Passed away three years ago in the parallel universe |
| Xiang Yun | Zhang Cuiyan 张翠燕 | Bee Hoon stall owner Mother of Zhiqing; Wife of Yang Guoli |
| Shaun Chen | Qiu Hanxiang 丘汉祥 | Jiang Wei's close and loyal friend In love with Meichen; Married with Meichen and had kids in the parallel universe |

=== Other cast ===
| Cast | Role | Description |
|---|---|---|
| Pamelyn Chee 齐騛 | Shen Meichen 沈美辰 | Doctor; Jiang Wei's fiancée Knocked down by a car and killed 3 years ago in the actual dimension |
| 符和增 | Chatterbox 口水公 | Duck rice stall tenant |
| Ang Twa Bak 洪大目 | Aunt Qin 琴妈 | One of the coffeeshop tenant |
| 邱佳慧 | Aunt Wanton 云吞嫂 | Wanton stall tenant |
| Seth Ang 翁兴昂 | Dong 老东 | |
| 朱玉叶 | Pan Baozhu 潘宝珠 | Jiang Wei's mother |
| Henry Heng 王利秦 | Jiang Han 江翰 | Jiang Wei's father |

=== Ep 1–4: Storey 13.5 ===
| Cast | Role | Description |
|---|---|---|
| Shannon Zann 苏仪珍 | Dong-sao 东嫂 | |
| 李弘 | Luo Weijian 罗伟健 | Dong-shu and Dong-sao's son |
| Pamelyn Chee | Shen Meichen 沈美辰 | Appeared in Jiang Wei's dreams |
| Scott C. Hillyard | Marble boy 弹珠少年 | A student playing marbles |
| Kelly Lim LT 林俐廷 | Mahjong lady 打牌女 | A lady "playing mahjong" there |
| 陈欽焕 | Singing man 唱歌男 | A man who appeared to be "singing in a concert" |

=== Ep 5–8: Youth stealer ===
| Cast | Role | Description |
|---|---|---|
| Rayson Tan | Chen Dayu 陈大雨 | Exchanged with Ye Rongguang's secret to immortality, where other people age rapidly while he looks younger by the day Caught in episode 8 |
| Yuan Shuai | Ye Rongguang 叶荣光 | Appears to be 31 years old but claims to be 176 years old Aged when Dayu first saw him Died as a 70-something year old in episode 5 after giving Dayu the secret to immortality Possessed his secret to immortality inherited from his master |
| Jerry Yeo | Jay Zhao Shijie 赵世杰 | Colleague of Dayu; Learnt about Dayu's secret to immortality Died in episode 7 due to rapid aging |
| Candyce Toh | Li Zhenwei 李珍薇 | Jay's girlfriend Looked 40 years older when Zhiqing first saw her Actually she is 27 years old |
| Dennis Chew | Marcus Ang | Executive of Dayu; Suddenly passed out due to rapid ageing (cameo appearance) |
| Edsel Lim | Younger version of Chen Dayu | After stealing Jay's youth, Dayu found himself being turned into a boy |
| Tracer Wong | Wang Xiuli 王秀莉 | Dayu's wife |
| 符嘉轩 | Chen Xiaojun 陈晓君 | Dayu and Xiuli's older daughter |
| Lyn Oh Ling En | Chen Xiaofang 陈晓芳 | Dayu and Xiuli's younger daughter |
| Tommy Wong 王昌黎 | Zhou Wantai 周万泰 | A billionaire Dayu's customer |
| Chong Ying Shi | Wu Jiaqing 吴嘉庆 | A mental asylum patient Wanted to avenge his wife after Ye Rongguang stole her youth |

=== Ep 9–11: Kampong Mimpi ===
The villagers appeared in episodes 10 and 11. Scenes took place in Kampong Buangkok.

| Cast | Role | Description |
|---|---|---|
| Henry Thia | Yang Guoli 杨国立 | Zhiqing's father Went missing for 5 years Claims to be one of the villagers in Kampong Mimpi; Decided to stay at Kampong Mimpi to save his actual family |
| Li Yue Jie 李岳杰 | Zhang Rencun 张仁村 | Villager head |
| Wang Rui Xian 王瑞显 | Chen Ji Xiang 陈吉祥 | A villager |
| Cai Long 蔡龙 | Li Ping An 李平安 | |
| Michelle Tay | Chen Ba-mei 陈八妹 | Guoli's said wife Village's sorceress. |
| Huang Ying En 黄颖恩 | Xiao Mei 小梅 | Guoli's said 7-year-old daughter Actual daughter of Ba-mei. |

=== Ep 12–14: Back in time ===
| Cast | Role | Description |
|---|---|---|
| Jeanette Aw | Yang Zhiqing 杨芷晴 | Transported three years back after being choked unconscious by Zhiliang; Went to the other dimension unexpectedly to stop Meichen from going missing |
| Li Nanxing | Jiang Wei 江伟 | Supposed to be Meichen's husband, but later caught in a love triangle. |
| Shaun Chen | Qiu Hanxiang 丘汉祥 | Is also fond of Meichen; Suspected Mingyao and Zhigang to be culprits behind Lixuan's comatose |
| Pamelyn Chee | Shen Meichen 沈美辰 | Caught in a love triangle Meichen chooses to run away from the marriage rehearsal |
| Sora Ma; Shi Xiang Jun 施香君 (younger version) | Qiu Lixuan 丘丽萱 | Hanxiang's younger sister An active long-runner before becoming a vegetative (a comatose person); Saved Zhiqing three times Died in episode 14 |
| Ryan Lian 廖永誼 (middle-aged version); Zong Zijie 宗子傑 (teenage version) | Mingyao 名耀 | Also involved in kidnapping activities |
| Zhan Wei Jie 詹偉傑 (middle-aged version); Deng Mao Jie 鄧茂傑 (teenage version) | Zhigang 志刚 | Accomplice to Mingyao; Also involved in kidnapping activities |
| | Luo Zhiliang 罗志良 | Lixuan's ex-boyfriend The real culprit behind Lixuan's and Zhiqing's comatose |
| Chen Xiang 陈翔 | Liu Guowei 刘国威 | Knocked Jiang Wei down three years ago |

=== Ep 15–17: Wenbin's inner soul ===
| Cast | Role | Description |
|---|---|---|
| Pierre Png | Xu Wenbin 许文斌 | A psychiatrist |
| Pierre Png | Wenbin's inner soul | A punk rocker, appeared in a wedding in the opening theme |
| Ng Hui | Xu Wenqian 许文茜 | Wenbin's elder sister Got a mental disorder due to her father's high expectations upon her and her brother |
| Zhang Wei | Xu Huangzong 许煌宗 | Wenbin and Wenqian's authoritative and domineering father |
| Tao Ying 陶樱 | Bixia 碧霞 | Wenbin and Wenqian's mother |
| Li Nanxing | Jiang Wei 江伟 | A private investigator who dedicates his life to looking for his fiancée Meichen for the past 3 years |
| Li Nanxing | Jiang Wei's inner soul | A vagrant who is "living in the past", and talks backwards |
| Simon Lai 黎少雄 | Ghost 鬼手 | Rock members of Wenbin's band |
| Zac Leow 廖子翔 | Slash | Rock members of Wenbin's band |
| Bryan Liu 刘德伟 | Adder | Rock members of Wenbin's band |

=== Ep 18–20: Another dimension / "Déjà vu" ===
(Storyline formed as a result of the events in 'Back in time')

| Cast | Role | Description |
|---|---|---|
| Li Nanxing | Jiang Wei 江伟 | Came to the new dimension with Zhiqing where he was supposedly dead in episode 14, three years ago Had a daughter with Meichen, called Jiang Nian |
| Shaun Chen | Qiu Hanxiang 丘汉祥 | Jiang Wei's close and loyal friend Meichen's boyfriend in the new dimension |
| Pamelyn Chee | Shen Meichen 沈美辰 | Hanxiang's girlfriend in the new dimension Had a daughter with Jiang Wei, called Jiang Nian; Killed in a car accident 3 years ago in the actual dimension |
| Xiang Yun | Zhang Cuiyan 张翠燕 | Moved house with Zhiqing after becoming famous |
| Pierre Png | Xu Wenbin 许文斌 | Psychiatrist; Zhiqing's boyfriend |
| Jeanette Aw | Yang Zhiqing 杨芷晴 | Came to the new dimension with Jiang Wei where she was supposed to be a rich celebrity |
| Jeanette Aw | Yang Zhiqing 杨芷晴 | A celebrity who hosted reality show Beautiful Psychic; In comparison with the Zhiqing from the actual dimension, she is a scheming woman and is always jealous of others She is kinder after realising her mistakes in episode 20 |
| Chen Shi En 陳詩恩 | Jiang Nian 江念 | The three-year-old daughter of the late Jiang Wei and Meichen |
| Su Cai Zhong 蘇才忠 | Hu Haoming 胡灝明 | A doctor, also one of the missing people who went into the new dimension three years ago The only person other than Jiang Wei to know the truth behind Meichen's disappearance in the actual dimension |
| Chen Xiang 陳翔 | Liu Guowei 劉國威 | Knocked Jiang Wei down intentionally three years ago in the new dimension in an act of revenge for his son Attacked Zhiqing from the new dimension, causing her to be unable to look into other people's souls Killed in a car accident in Episode 20 |

== Production ==
The drama was originally meant to be called 异能元素.

Filming for this drama started on end Apr 2012 and completed its filming in early Jul. Due to special effects used in the drama, the drama is only broadcast at the end of the year.

== Trivia ==
- Dennis Chew's return to acting on TV after 10 years. He last acted in the sitcom My Genie 2 in 2002.
- Jeanette Aw will play two roles as Zhiqing. She will play in both the real dimension and the alternate dimension.

== Accolades ==
| Year | Award | Category | Recipient(s) | Result | Ref |
|---|---|---|---|---|---|
| 2013 | Asian Television Awards | Best Theme Song | 呼吸 by Mary Wong | Highly Commended | |
| 2014 | Star Awards | Best Theme Song | 呼吸 by Mary Wong | Nominated | |
| 2014 | Star Awards | Best Programme Promo 最佳宣传短片 | Loo Li Min 卢俐敏 | Nominated | |
| 2014 | Star Awards | Best Screenplay 最佳剧本 | Phang Kai Yee 彭凯毅 | Nominated | |
| 2014 | Star Awards | Best Supporting Actress | Xiang Yun | Nominated | |
| 2014 | Star Awards | Best Drama Serial | —N/a | Nominated | |
| 2014 | Star Awards | Top Rated Drama Serial 2013 | —N/a | Nominated | |

== See also ==
- List of MediaCorp Channel 8 Chinese Drama Series (2010s)
