= 96°C Café =

Chinese-language Singaporean coffee and romance transmedia project

- 96°C 咖啡
- Genre: Romance; Idol drama
- Written by: Lim Gim Lan 林锦兰; Goh Chwee Chwee 吴翠翠
- Starring: Desmond Tan; Julie Tan; Tay Ping Hui; Romeo Tan; Chris Tong; Ian Fang
- Opening theme: Webisode: 《咖啡恋》 by Teresa Tseng; Episode: 《啡情歌》 by Wei En
- Country of origin: Singapore
- Original language: Chinese
- No. of episodes: 8 (webisode); 20 (episode)

Production
- Producer: Soh Bee Lian 苏美莲
- Running time: approx. 45 minutes

Original release
- Network: Mediacorp Channel 8
- Release: 29 April – 24 May 2013

96°C Café
- Traditional Chinese: 96°C 咖啡
- Simplified Chinese: 96°C 咖啡
Transcriptions
Standard Mandarin
- Hanyu Pinyin: Jiǔ Shí Liù Dù C Kā Fēi

96 °C Café (Chinese: 96 °C 咖啡) is MediaCorp's first transmedia project related to coffee and romance. It was broadcast from 29 April to 24 May 2013 on free-to-air channel MediaCorp Channel 8 and consists of 20 episodes. It stars Desmond Tan, Julie Tan, Tay Ping Hui, Romeo Tan, Chris Tong and Ian Fang as the main casts of the series. Prior to the drama serial, prequels of two webisodes each week were released on xinfirst's portal progressively, for a period of four weeks, Mondays from 18 February to 11 March 2013.

It was one of the two lowest-rated drama series at 9 p.m., with the other being Sudden.

== Episodes ==
=== Prequel webisodes ===
No.	Title	Original release date	Original airdate (Channel 8)
1	"1st Cup"	February 18, 2013	April 7, 2013
2	"2nd Cup"	February 18, 2013	April 7, 2013
3	"3rd Cup"	February 25, 2013	April 14, 2013
4	"4th Cup"	February 25, 2013	April 14, 2013
5	"5th Cup"	March 4, 2013	April 21, 2013
6	"6th Cup"	March 4, 2013	April 21, 2013
7	"7th Cup"	March 11, 2013	April 28, 2013
8	"8th Cup"	March 11, 2013	April 28, 2013

=== Series ===
No.	Title	Original release date
1	"Episode One"	April 29, 2013
2	"Episode Two"	April 30, 2013
3	"Episode Three"	May 1, 2013
4	"Episode Four"	May 2, 2013
5	"Episode Five"	May 3, 2013
6	"Episode Six"	May 6, 2013
7	"Episode Seven"	May 6, 2013
8	"Episode Eight"	May 8, 2013
9	"Episode Nine"	May 9, 2013
10	"Episode Ten"	May 10, 2013
11	"Episode Eleven"	May 13, 2013
12	"Episode Twelve"	May 14, 2013
13	"Episode Thirteen"	May 15, 2013
14	"Episode Fourteen"	May 16, 2013
15	"Episode Fifteen"	May 17, 2013
16	"Episode Sixteen"	May 14, 2013
17	"Episode Seventeen"	May 21, 2013
18	"Episode Eighteen"	May 22, 2013
19	"Episode Nineteen"	May 23, 2013
20	"Episode Twenty (Finale)"	May 24, 2013
-	"Post-Drama Song"	May 26, 2013
(This special conclusion is made after the vote at Chinatown Point. The conclusion was made into a song. In the special song, Yu Chen chooses Chuan Zhi in the end. This features the full edition of the theme song.)

== Cast ==
- Desmond Tan as Xu Liqiao 徐立乔, Boss of 96 °C Café, Xi Jie's husband
- Romeo Tan as Tang Wei Da 唐伟大
- Julie Tan as Tang Yu Chen 唐雨晨, Staff of 96 °C Café. Wei Da's younger sister.
- Tay Ping Hui as Lao Jing Feng 劳敬丰, Godbrother of Wei Da and Yu Chen
- Chris Tong as Xu Ruo Lin 徐若琳, Li Qiao's elder sister
- Ian Fang as Liu Chuan Zhi 刘传之, Staff at 96 °C Café, Liu Hao Ren's son.
- Cynthia Koh as Ann, Liu Hao Ren's mistress

Cast	Character	Description
Jin Yinji	Grandma Xu 徐奶奶	Ruo Lin and Li Qiao's grandmother (Age 70)
Zhu Houren	Ren Tang San 仁唐三	Wei Da and Yu Chen's father (Age 57)
Lim Peifen	Herself	YES 93.3 FM DJ, a regular customer of 96 °C Café. Jing Feng's ex-girlfriend. (Age 26)
Wang Yuqing	Liu Hao Ren 刘浩仁	Chuan Zhi's father (Age 53)
Adam Chen	Bill	Ex-boyfriend of Ruolin (Age 36)
Tracy Lee	Tara	Lao Jinfeng's patient, ex-singer. (Age 27)
Jayley Woo	Luo Wen Jie 洛文洁	Xi Jie's younger sister (Age 20)
Zhang Zhenhuan	Wei Da 威达	A deliveryman. (Age 24)
Paige Chua	Luo Xi Jie 洛曦洁	Li Qiao's wife who died in a car accident. Wen Jie's elder sister. (Age 27)
Chantalle Ng	Lin Shuting 林舒亭	Yuchen's friend. Suffers arrhenphobia (fear of men) (Age 21)
James Seah	Ziwei 子维	A regular patron of 96 °C Café, Shu Ting's senior. (Age 23)

== Accoladeslades ==
Organisation	Year	Category	Nominees	Result	Ref.
Star Awards	2014	Best Theme Song	"啡情歌" by Wei En 薇恩	Nominated	
Star Awards	2014	Best Drama Serial		Nominated	
Star Awards	2014	Top Rated Drama Serial 2013 最高收视率电视剧 2013		Nominated	

== See also ==
- List of 96°C Café episodes
- List of MediaCorp Channel 8 Chinese Drama Series (2010s)
