= Romeo Tan =

Singaporean actor and host

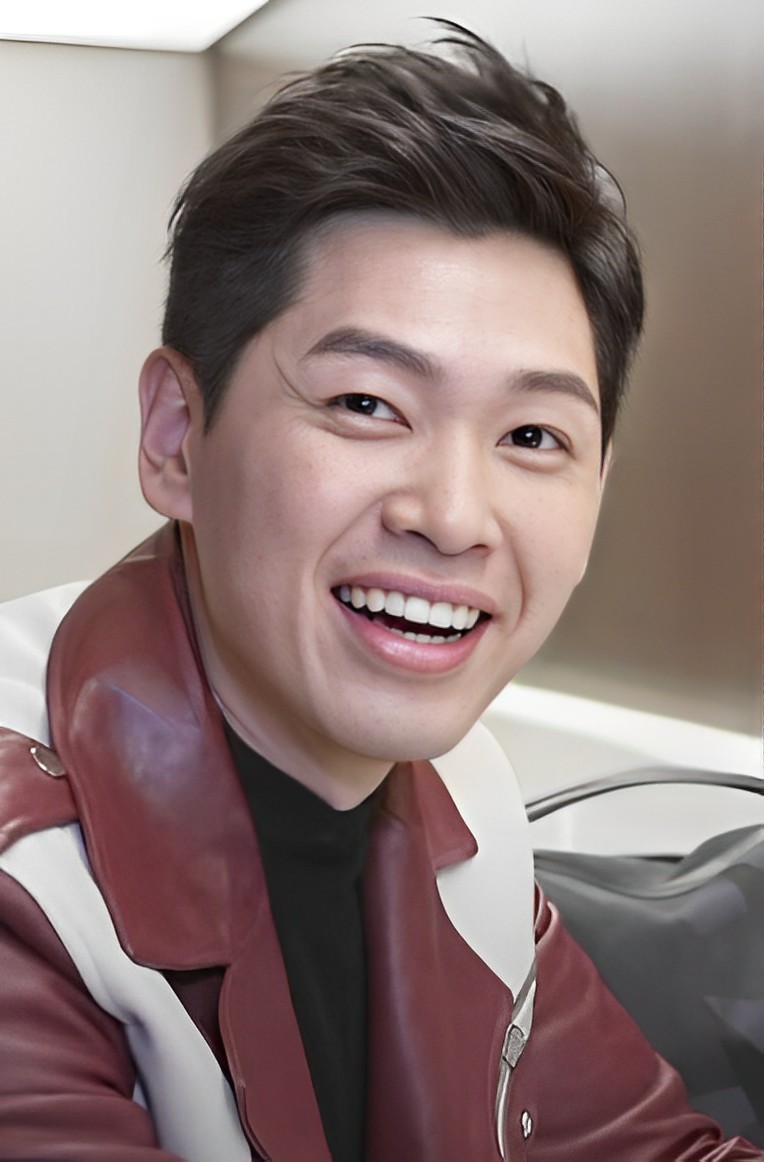
- Tan at the backstage of Star Awards 2017
- Born: Tan Romeo; 9 April 1985 (age 41); Singapore
- Education: Ngee Ann Secondary School; ITE MacPherson
- Alma mater: Nanyang Polytechnic
- Occupations: Actor; host; model
- Years active: 2010–present
- Awards: Full list

Chinese name
- Traditional Chinese: 陳羅密歐
- Simplified Chinese: 陈罗密欧
- Hanyu Pinyin: Chén Luómìōu

Romeo Tan (born Tan Romeo on 9 April 1985) is a Singaporean actor, who has been named as one of the 8 Dukes of Caldecott Hill. Tan came into prominence after finishing in fourth place on the tenth season of the talent search series Star Search in 2010.

== Early life ==
Tan studied at Ngee Ann Secondary School and multimedia technology at ITE MacPherson. He then went on to graduate with a diploma in digital media design from Nanyang Polytechnic.

== Career ==
Romeo Tan made his television debut on the fourth season of Heartlanders in 2005.

In 2010, after completing his filming for The Best Things in Life, Tan participated in the tenth season of Star Search. He auditioned for the competition and was accepted for the competition. Tan finished in fourth place, losing the title to Jeffrey Xu. He was offered a two-year contract by MediaCorp together with Xu, Adeline Lim, Sora Ma, James Seah, and Darryl Yong. In 2012, Romeo Tan was the first among his fellow Star Search finalists to be given a supporting role in the critically acclaimed police procedural series C.L.I.F.. He was nominated for the Best Newcomer Award at Star Awards 2012 for his performance, but lost the award to Kate Pang. He was then given a role in the star-studded drama series Joys of Life and made a career breakthrough in which he played a role as an antagonist for the first time. His performance was well-received from the public, and was widely regarded as one of the current rising stars. He was given another leading role in Don't Stop Believin', which he played a role of Jin Zhengnan, a charming chef who experienced a love triangle with Du Siman (Felicia Chin) and Wu Yanbin (Elvin Ng). He later also appeared in the year-end blockbuster, It Takes Two as the Fish Prince. In 2013, Romeo Tan replaced Dai Xiang Yu, who was originally selected to play the role of Hong Khee Leong, as the male lead in the drama series Sudden. He was also one of the original singers of the theme song of the drama series, together with Da Feng Chui.

In 2014, he participated in the drama serials, Yes We Can! and The Journey: Tumultuous Times. In 2015, he participated in the drama serials, Good Luck, The Journey: Our Homeland, and The Dream Makers II. He was nominated for Best Actor, Star Awards for Favourite Male Character and won London Choco Roll Happiness Award in Star Awards 2016. In 2016, he participated in a toggle original series as the male lead, Soul Reaper and also he participated in the drama serials Peace & Prosperity and The Dream Job, and won Best Supporting Actor and Top 10 Most Popular Artistes in Star Awards 2017. In 2017, he participated in the films Dream Coder, When Duty Calls, and Life Less Ordinary that led to his second nomination for Best Actor and Best Theme Song in Star Awards 2018. In 2018, he participated in the drama Say Cheese. In 2019, he participated in the dramas How Are You? and All Is Well – Taiwan.

Tan had won 10 Star Awards for Top 10 Most Popular Male Artistes − from 2014–2015, 2017–2019 and 2021-2025 respectively. In 2026, Tan received his All-Time Favourite Artiste award for receiving 10 Most Popular Artiste awards.

== Personal life ==
In May 2020, Tan revealed on his social media account that he had purchased an apartment unit at Marina One Residences, a condominium development which is located at the Central Business District (CBD) in Singapore. The media estimated the unit to cost at least S$1.67 million. Prior to that, Tan had lived in a four-room HDB flat in Simei with seven of his family members; including his parents, his two brothers, his sister-in-law, his nephew and niece. He also had to share a room with his younger brother since young.

== Filmography ==
=== Television series ===
Year	Title	Role	Notes	Ref.
2005	Heartlanders			
2005	Portrait of Home	Joe		
2006	C.I.D			
2007	Happily Ever After	Cameo		
2010	The Best Things in Life	Dream's younger brother		
2011	Let's Play Love	Ash		
2011	C.L.I.F.	Xu Wenxiong		
2011	Bountiful Blessings	Ah Bang		
2011	In Time with You	Romeo		
2012	Of Love & Hidden Charms	Marcus Woon		
2012	Unriddle 2	Fu Hongbo		
2012	Joys of Life	Qian Erduo		
2012	Don't Stop Believin'	Jin Zhengnan		
2012	It Takes Two	Liu Ziqiang		
2013	96°C Café	Tang Weida		
2013	Easy Breezy: When Picky Meets Messy (微风—恶男劣女)	Luo Naduo		
2013	Easy Breezy: A Date Gone Wrong (微微风—佳人有约)	Darren		
2013	Testube: Unconditional Love (实验视—无尽的爱)	Ivan		
2013	Art of Love: Painted Walls (心。艺—心灵围城)	Mr Ng		
2013	Sudden	Fang Qiliang		
2014	Youthful Aspirations (细水长流)	Xia Jiawei		
2014	Yes We Can!	Liu Junwei		
2014	Mystic Whispers (听)	Zhang Ji'en		
2014	The Journey: Tumultuous Times	Zhang Yan		
2015	Good Luck	Liu Xuan		
2015	Love? (限量爱情)	Romeo Ho		
2015	The Journey: Our Homeland	Zhang Yan / Hong Kuan		
2015	The Dream Makers II	Zhong Yiming		
2016	Peace & Prosperity	Lan Baojie		
2016	The Dream Job	Tim Goh		
2016	Soul Reaper (勾魂使者)	Chief		
2017	Dream Coder	Zhong Zhenlong		
2017	When Duty Calls	Xu Longbin		
2018	Life Less Ordinary	Chen Yalong		
2018	Say Cheese	Ke Yuanhang		
2019	How Are You?	Xiao Gandang		
2019	How Are You?	Xiao Lang		
2019	Lion Moms 3			
2019	The Droner (航拍男)	—N/a	Telemovie (as director)	
2019	All Is Well – Taiwan (你那边怎样，我这边OK)	Ye Donghuang		
2019	A World of Difference (都市狂想)	Eason Lim		
2020	Happy Prince (快乐王子)	Wang Zile		
2020	All Around You (回路网)			
2020	How Are You? 2 (好世谋2)	Xiao Gandang		
2020	Jungle Survivor (森林生存记)	Guan Weitang		
2021	Soul Old yet So Young (心里住着老灵魂)	Shi Wenfeng		
2021	The Peculiar Pawnbroker (人心鉴定师)	Qiu Keyan		
2022	I Want to be a Tow Kay (亲家、冤家做头家)	Liu Junqiang		
2022	Twisted Strings (良辰吉时)	Lun		
2022	In Safe Hands (守护星)	Wang Junyi		
2022	Love At First Bite (遇见你，真香！)	Ray Liu Chenguang		
2023	Shero	Yue Ruixiang		
2023	Till the End	Sun Haoming		
2025	Emerald Hill - The Little Nyonya Story	Zhang Jin Quan		

=== Film ===
Year	Title	Role	Notes	Ref.
2011	Already Famous			
2014	Common Space	Ah Seng		

=== Variety show ===
Year	Title	Notes	Ref.
2014	Green Footprints (绿悠游)	Host	
2018	My Star Guide 13	Host	
2020	Travel Diaries (旅行的意忆)	Host (Ep 5: "Romeo Tan: Taiwan, Eastern Europe")	

== Discography ==
=== Singles ===
Year	Song title
2013	"骤变"
2014	"十指紧扣"
2017	"等爱"
2017	"小人物向前冲"

=== Compilation albums ===
Year	English title	Mandarin title
2013	MediaCorp Music Lunar New Year Album 13	群星贺岁金蛇献祥和
2015	MediaCorp Music Lunar New Year Album 15	新传媒群星金羊添吉祥
2016	MediaCorp Music Lunar New Year Album 16	新传媒群星金猴添喜庆
2017	MediaCorp Music Lunar New Year Album 17	新传媒群星咕鸡咕鸡庆丰年
2018	MediaCorp Music Lunar New Year Album 18	新传媒群星阿狗狗过好年
2019	MediaCorp Music Lunar New Year Album 19	新传媒群星猪饱饱欢乐迎肥年
2020	MediaCorp Music Lunar New Year Album 20	裕鼠鼠纳福迎春了
2021	MediaCorp Music Lunar New Year Album 21	福满牛年Moo Moo乐
2023	MediaCorp Music Lunar New Year Album 23	新传媒2023贺岁传辑哈皮兔宝福星照

== Awards and nominations ==
Organisation	Year	Category	Nominated work	Result	Ref.
Asian Television Awards	2013	Best Actor in a Supporting Role	Joys of Life	Nominated	
PPCTV Awards	2015	Favorite Supporting Actor	Joys of Life	Won	
PPCTV Awards	2015	Favorite Male TV Character	It Takes Two	Nominated	
PPCTV Awards	2015	Favourite Onscreen Couple	Sudden	Nominated	
Star Awards	2012	Systema Charming Smile Award	—N/a	Nominated	
Star Awards	2012	Best Newcomer	C.L.I.F.	Nominated	
Star Awards	2013	Best Supporting Actor	Joys of Life	Nominated	
Star Awards	2013	Rocket Award	Joys of Life	Won	
Star Awards	2013	Favourite Male Character	Joys of Life	Nominated	
Star Awards	2013	Top 10 Most Popular Male Artistes	—N/a	Nominated	
Star Awards	2014	Star Awards for Most Popular Regional Artiste (China)	—N/a	Nominated	
Star Awards	2014	Star Awards for Most Popular Regional Artiste (Cambodia)	—N/a	Nominated	
Star Awards	2014	Star Awards for Most Popular Regional Artiste (Indonesia)	—N/a	Nominated	
Star Awards	2014	Favourite Male Character	Sudden	Nominated	
Star Awards	2014	Favourite Onscreen Couple (with Rui En)	Sudden	Nominated	
Star Awards	2014	London Choco Roll Happiness Award	96°C Café	Nominated	
Star Awards	2014	Top 10 Most Popular Male Artistes	—N/a	Won	
Star Awards	2015	Star Awards for Most Popular Regional Artiste (China)	—N/a	Nominated	
Star Awards	2015	Star Awards for Most Popular Regional Artiste (Cambodia)	—N/a	Nominated	
Star Awards	2015	Star Awards for Most Popular Regional Artiste (Indonesia)	—N/a	Nominated	
Star Awards	2015	Star Awards for Most Popular Regional Artiste (Malaysia)	—N/a	Nominated	
Star Awards	2015	Favourite Male Character	The Journey: Tumultuous Times	Nominated	
Star Awards	2015	Favourite Onscreen Couple	Yes We Can!	Nominated	
Star Awards	2015	London Choco Roll Happiness Award	Yes We Can!	Nominated	
Star Awards	2015	Toggle Outstanding Duke Award	—N/a	Nominated	
Star Awards	2015	Top 10 Most Popular Male Artistes	—N/a	Won	
Star Awards	2016	Best Actor	The Dream Makers II	Nominated	
Star Awards	2016	London Choco Roll Happiness Award	The Dream Makers II	Won	
Star Awards	2016	Favourite Male Character	The Journey: Our Homeland	Nominated	
Star Awards	2016	Top 10 Most Popular Male Artistes	—N/a	Nominated	
Star Awards	2017	Best Supporting Actor	The Dream Job	Won	
Star Awards	2017	Bioskin Healthiest Hair Award	The Dream Job	Nominated	
Star Awards	2017	Top 10 Most Popular Male Artistes	—N/a	Won	
Star Awards	2018	Best Actor	Life Less Ordinary	Nominated	
Star Awards	2018	Best Theme Song	Life Less Ordinary	Nominated	
Star Awards	2018	Top 10 Most Popular Male Artistes	—N/a	Won	
Star Awards	2019	Top 10 Most Popular Male Artistes	—N/a	Won	
Star Awards	2021	Bioskin Most Charismatic Artiste Award	—N/a	Won	
Star Awards	2021	Best Actor	Happy Prince	Nominated	
Star Awards	2021	Top 10 Most Popular Male Artistes	—N/a	Won	
Star Awards	2022	Best Actor	Soul Old Yet So Young	Nominated	
Star Awards	2022	Top 10 Most Popular Male Artistes	—N/a	Won	
Star Awards	2023	Top 10 Most Popular Male Artistes	—N/a	Won	
Star Awards	2023	Chan Brothers My Star Guide Award	—N/a	Nominated	
Star Awards	2024	Top 10 Most Popular Male Artistes	—N/a	Won	
Star Awards	2025	Top 10 Most Popular Male Artistes	—N/a	Won	
Star Awards	2026	Best Actor	Emerald Hill - The Little Nyonya Story	Nominated	
Star Awards	2026	All-Time Favourite Artiste	—N/a	Won	
Star Awards	2026	Favourite CP	Emerald Hill - The Little Nyonya Story	Nominated	
Star Awards	2026	Most Hated Villian	Emerald Hill - The Little Nyonya Story	Nominated	
