= Desmond Tan (actor) =

Singaporean actor (born 1986)

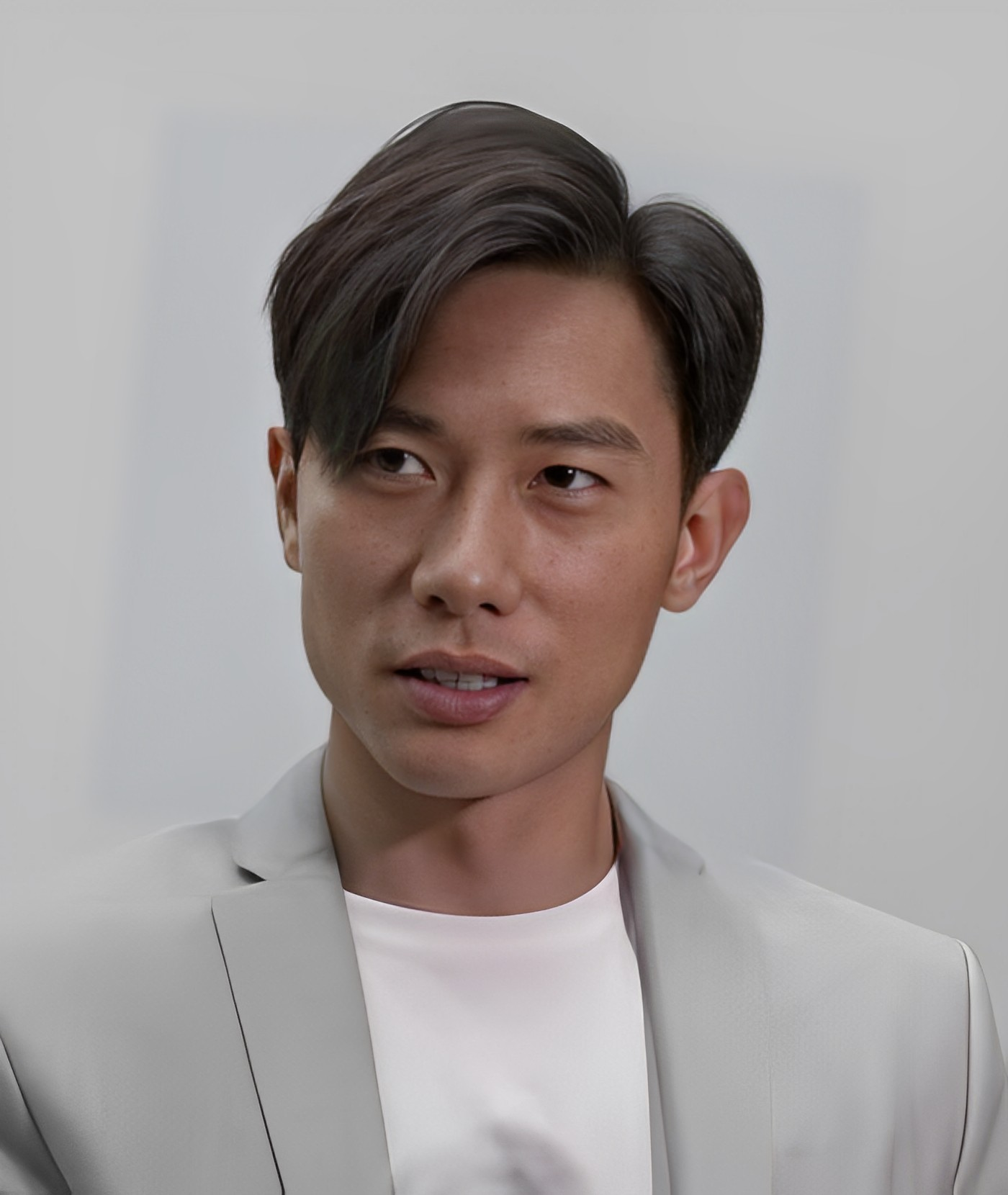
- Tan in June 2017
- Born: 19 August 1986 (age 40); Singapore
- Education: Jurong Junior College
- Alma mater: National University of Singapore
- Occupations: Actor; singer; host
- Years active: 2008–present
- Agent: The Celebrity Agency
- Spouse: Unknown (m. 2021)
- Children: 2
- Awards: Full list
- Musical career
- Genre: Mandopop
- Instrument: Vocals

Chinese name
- Traditional Chinese: 陳泂江
- Simplified Chinese: 陈泂江
- Hanyu Pinyin: Chén Jiǒngjiāng

Desmond Tan (born 19 August 1986) is a Singaporean actor. He won the Star Awards for Best Actor twice in 2018 and 2026 for his role in When Duty Calls and Devil Behind The Gate respectively. He had also won the Star Awards for Top 10 Most Popular Male Artistes ten times.

== Education ==
Tan was educated at Pioneer Secondary School and Jurong Junior College. After participating in Star Search 2007, he juggled acting commitments with studies at the National University of Singapore. He studied real estate and graduated with an honours degree in 2011.

== Career ==
In 2007, Tan participated in Star Search 2007, a Mediacorp's reality talent search show, and was runner-up in the show. He was awarded a contract with Mediacorp and began his part time acting career with some minor roles in various Channel 8 dramas.

After almost five years in the industry, Tan won his first award, the Rocket Award, at the 2012 Star Awards for the biggest breakthrough after a critically acclaimed performance as rickshaw driver Luo Xiaoxiao in the anniversary drama A Song to Remember.

In 2018, he starred as the fictional serial killer Derek Ho in Code of Law. Tan later won Best Actor at the Star Awards for his role as Loke Junguang in When Duty Calls, a military television series sponsored by the Ministry of Defence and Ministry of Home Affairs.

Tan had won ten Star Awards for Top 10 Most Popular Male Artistes in 2014, 2017, 2018, 2019, 2021, 2022, 2023, 2024, 2025 and 2026.

During the Star Awards 2026, Tan won his second Best Actor award for Devil Behind The Gate and his tenth Most Popular Male Artiste award. He also won the BYD Favourite Male Character Award for the same role.

== Personal life ==
Tan completed his national service in the 1st Commando Battalion with the rank of Captain.

On 7 December 2021, Tan married his university sweetheart at a ceremony held in France. On 4 October 2023, Desmond announced on social media that his wife was pregnant. Their daughter was born on 5 March 2024. On 3 April 2025, Tan announced via Instagram that his wife is pregnant with their second child, a boy.

== Filmography ==
=== Television series ===
Year	Title	Role	Notes	Ref.
2008	Beach Ball Babes (球爱大战)			
2008	Crime Busters x 2	Hu Zhiyang		
2009	The Dream Catchers	Will		
2009	The Ultimatum			
2009	Together	Lin Dehua		
2010	The Best Things in Life	Beethoven		
2010	Breakout	Cai Haoyu		
2011	C.L.I.F.	Xu Wenbin		
2011	A Song to Remember	Luo Xiaoxiao		
2012	Bluff (别搞怪！)	Mr Wang		
2012	The Enchanted	Du Jiahong		
2012	Poetic Justice	Tang Zhisheng		
2013	It's a Wonderful Life	Hao Fuqi		
2013	96°C Café	Xu Liqiao		
2013	The Dream Makers	Gao Jian		
2013	The Journey: A Voyage	Hong Shi		
2014	Against The Tide	Zhou Jianfeng		
2014	The Journey: Tumultuous Times	Hong Shi		
2014	Point of Entry	Victor de Cruz		
2014	Spouse for House	Tan Kai Lan		
2015	Love on Air (音为爱)	Eason	TesTube Episode	
2015	Second Chance (流氓律师)	Li Dashan		
2015	Spouse For House 2	Tan Kai Lan		
2015	Mata Mata: A New Generation	Tommy Foo		
2016	Peace & Prosperity	Hong Yingxiong		
2016	The Truth Seekers	Hong Junyan		
2016	Hero	Himself		
2017	Dream Coder	Zheng Hongyi		
2017	When Duty Calls	Lu Junguang		
2018	Eat Already? 4	Oliver		
2018	VIC	Wu Shenghao		
2018	Love at Cavenagh Bridge (加文纳桥的约定)	Fang Yiqun		
2018	Blue Tick (已读不回)	Mo Sidong		
2018	You Can Be An Angel 3 (你也可以是天使3)	Sunny Xia Yaoyang		
2018	Code of Law (Season 4)	Derek Ho Zhi Zhong		
2019	Hello From The Other Side – Its Time (阴错阳差 — 时辰到)	Gary		
2019	All Is Well – Singapore (你那边怎样，我这边OK)	Wu Pinrui		
2019	Derek – Code Of Law	Derek Ho Zhi Zhong		
2020	Who Is Killer? (谁是凶手？)	Liu Zhi Qiang		
2020	All Around You (回路网)	Huo Junhao		
2020	Code of Law (Final Season)	Derek Ho Zhi Zhong		
2021	CTRL	Zhou Zhiping		
2021	Key Witness (关键证人)	Chen Zhiming		
2021	The Take Down (肃战肃绝)	Zhou Haoyang		
2022	Home Again (多年后的全家福)	Ah Lang		
2022	I Want To Be A Towkay (亲家冤家做头家)	Himself	Cameo	
2022	When Duty Calls 2 (卫国先锋2)	Lu Junguang		
2023	Strike Gold	Liu Guangming		
2023	All That Glitters	Lin Musen (Liu Mu)		
2024	Moments (时光倾城)	Zhan Hefeng		
2025	Devil Behind The Gate (庭外的一角)	Yuan Yingcai; Yuan Yingjie		

=== Film ===
Year	Title	Role	Notes	Ref.
2010	Love Cuts	Young customer	Special appearance	
2014	1400	Rain		
2018	The Big Day	Xu Nuoyan		
2026	Pace	Malcolm		

=== Variety show hosting ===
Year	Title	Notes	Ref.
2013	My Star Guide 8 (我的导游是明星 8)		
2015	My Star Guide 10 (我的导游是明星 10)		
2017	My Star Guide 12 (我的导游是明星 12)		
2018	Away with My BFF (老友出走记)		
2025	Mind Our Business (艺起耍大牌)		

== Discography ==
=== Compilation albums ===
Year	English title	Mandarin title
2015	MediaCorp Music Lunar New Year Album 15	新传媒群星金羊添吉祥
2016	MediaCorp Music Lunar New Year Album 16	新传媒群星金猴添喜庆
2017	MediaCorp Music Lunar New Year Album 17	新传媒群星咕鸡咕鸡庆丰年
2018	MediaCorp Music Lunar New Year Album 18	新传媒群星阿狗狗过好年
2019	MediaCorp Music Lunar New Year Album 19	新传媒群星猪饱饱欢乐迎肥年
2020	MediaCorp Music Lunar New Year Album 20	裕鼠鼠纳福迎春了
2021	MediaCorp Music Lunar New Year Album 21	福满牛年Moo Moo乐
2023	MediaCorp Music Lunar New Year Album 23	新传媒2023贺岁传辑哈皮兔宝福星照

=== Singles ===
Year	Title	Notes	Ref.
2013	"关怀方式"		
2017	"Merry Summer Christmas"		
2017	"关怀新方式"	For the drama series When Duty Calls	
2018	"将爱延续"	For the drama series Blue Tick (以读不回)	
2018	"大大的爱"	For the drama series You Can Be An Angel 3 (你也可以是天使 3)	
2022	"夜空的魔法"	For the drama series Home Again (多年后的全家福)	
2025	"错爱"	For the drama series Devil Behind The Gate (庭外的一角)	

== Awards and nominations ==
Organisation	Year	Award	Nominated work	Result	Ref.
Star Awards	2010	Unforgettable Villain	Together (as Lin Dahua)	Nominated	
Star Awards	2012	Rocket Award	A Song To Remember (as Luo Xiaoxiao)	Won	
Star Awards	2014	Star Awards for Most Popular Regional Artiste (China)	—N/a	Nominated	
Star Awards	2014	Star Awards for Most Popular Regional Artiste (Indonesia)	—N/a	Nominated	
Star Awards	2014	Top 10 Most Popular Male Artistes	—N/a	Won	
Star Awards	2014	Favourite Male Character	The Journey: A Voyage (as Hong Shi)	Nominated	
Star Awards	2015	Top 10 Most Popular Male Artistes	—N/a	Nominated	
Star Awards	2015	Star Awards for Most Popular Regional Artiste (Indonesia)	—N/a	Nominated	
Star Awards	2016	London Choco Roll Happiness Award	Second Chance (as Li Dashan)	Nominated	
Star Awards	2017	Top 10 Most Popular Male Artistes	—N/a	Won	
Star Awards	2018	Best Actor	When Duty Calls (as Loke Junguang)	Won	
Star Awards	2018	Top 10 Most Popular Male Artistes	—N/a	Won	
Star Awards	2016	Best Actor	You Can Be An Angel 3 (as Xia Yaoyang Sunny)	Nominated	
Star Awards	2016	Top 10 Most Popular Male Artistes	—N/a	Won	
Star Awards	2021	Best Actor	All is Well – Singapore (as Wu Pinrui)	Nominated	
Star Awards	2021	Bioskin Most Charismatic Artiste Award	—N/a	Nominated	
Star Awards	2021	Top 10 Most Popular Male Artistes	—N/a	Won	
Star Awards	2022	Best Actor	Key Witness (as Chen Zhiming)	Nominated	
Star Awards	2022	The Male Show Stealer	Key Witness (as Chen Zhiming)	Nominated	
Star Awards	2022	Bioskin Most Charismatic Artiste Award	—N/a	Won	
Star Awards	2022	Top 10 Most Popular Male Artistes	—N/a	Won	
Star Awards	2023	Top 10 Most Popular Male Artistes	—N/a	Won	
Star Awards	2024	Best Actor	All That Glitters (as Lin Musen)	Nominated	
Star Awards	2024	Favourite Male Character	All That Glitters (as Lin Musen)	Nominated	
Star Awards	2024	Favourite Onscreen Couple (Drama)	As Lin Musen with Li Zhenyu (All That Glitters)	Won	
Star Awards	2024	Top 10 Most Popular Male Artistes	—N/a	Won	
Star Awards	2025	Top 10 Most Popular Male Artistes	—N/a	Won	
Star Awards	2026	Best Actor	Devil Behind The Gate (as Yuan Yingcai/Yuan Yingjie)	Won	
Star Awards	2026	Favourite Male Character	As Yuan Yingcai/Yuan Yingjie (Devil Behind The Gate)	Won	
Star Awards	2026	Top 10 Most Popular Male Artistes	—N/a	Won	
PPCTV Awards	2015	Favourite Male Character (Cambodia)	The Journey: A Voyage (as Hong Shi)	Nominated	
PPCTV Awards	2015	Favourite Lead Actor (Cambodia)	The Journey: A Voyage (as Hong Shi)	Nominated	
PPCTV Awards	2015	Favourite Onscreen Couple (with Jeanette Aw) (Cambodia)	The Journey: A Voyage (as Hong Shi)	Won	
