= Gonna Make It (TV series) =

Singapore Chinese television drama

- 小小传奇
- Genre: Drama
- Written by: Ng Kah Huay 黄佳华
- Directed by: Wong Kuang Yong 黄光荣; Wong Foong Hwee 黄芬菲
- Starring: Julie Tan; Bryan Wong; Xu Bin; Edwin Goh; Ya Hui
- Opening theme: 小小故事 by Lin Si Tong
- Ending theme: 明天 by Nick Yeo
- Country of origin: Singapore
- Original language: Chinese
- No. of episodes: 20

Production
- Executive producer: Wong Kuang Yong 黄光荣
- Running time: approx. 45 minutes (exc. advertisements)

Original release
- Network: MediaCorp Channel 8
- Release: 30 September – 25 October 2013

Related
- Sudden; Disclosed

Gonna Make It (Chinese: 小小传奇) is a Mediacorp Channel 8 drama television series that was broadcast from 30 September 2013 to 25 October 2013 and consist of 20 episodes. It stars Julie Tan, Bryan Wong, Xu Bin, Edwin Goh and Ya Hui as the casts of the series.

== Cast ==
Cast	Role
Julie Tan 陈欣淇	Su Xiao Xiao 苏小小
Bryan Wong 王禄江	Liu Ah Man 刘阿满 (Deceased - Episode 17)
Xu Bin 徐彬	Oscar Yang Yuan Shuai 杨元帅
Edwin Goh 吴劲威	Li Fei Long 李飞龙
Ya Hui 雅慧	Main Villain Zhang Wen Ya 张文雅
Jin Yinji 金银姬	Su Chenxi 苏晨夕
Zhang Wei 张为	Grandfather 外公
May Phua 潘淑钦	Su Zhen Zhu 苏珍珠
San Yow 姚玟隆	Zhang Zheng Gang 张正刚
Lin Meijiao 林梅娇	Zhou Mei Na 周美娜
Christina Lim 林佩芬	Moon
Jeffrey Xu 徐鸣杰	Ah Hui 阿辉
Cynthia Koh 许美珍	Villain Monica
Adam Chen 詹金泉	Ice
Hu Wensui	

== Trivia ==
- Edwin Goh's 2013 drama after Don't Stop Believin.
- Bryan Wong returns to acting after 5 years. He last acted in the sitcom Folks Jump Over The Wall in 2007.

== Overseas broadcast ==
This drama is the fourteenth drama on Malaysian satellite television Astro to be broadcast concurrently with Singapore, two weeks' behind the original telecast.

Country of Broadcast	Broadcasting Network	Premiere	Finale	Preceded by	Followed by
Malaysia	Astro Shuang Xing	17 October 2013 at 4.30pm, weekdays (encore on 18 October at 3.30pm, weekdays)	13 November 2013 (encore on 14 November)	Sudden	Disclosed

== Awards and nominations ==
=== Star Awards 20 ===
Gonna Make It is nominated for 5 awards in the Star Awards 20.

Nominee / Work	Award	Accolade	Result
Wong Kuang Yong 黄光荣	Star Awards 20 Show 1 红星大奖20	Best Director 最佳导演	Nominated
Ng Kah Huay 黄佳华	Star Awards 20 Show 1 红星大奖20	Best Screenplay 最佳剧本	Nominated
Xu Bin 徐彬	Star Awards 20 Show 1 红星大奖20	Favourite Male Character 最喜爱男角色	Nominated
Xu Bin 徐彬 and Julie Tan 陈欣淇	Star Awards 20 Show 1 红星大奖20	Favourite Onscreen Couple 最喜爱银幕情侣	Top three
Bryan Wong 王禄江	Star Awards 20 Show 2 红星大奖20	Best Actor 最佳男主角	Nominated

== See also ==
- List of programmes broadcast by Mediacorp Channel 8
- List of Gonna Make It episodes
