= List of The Dream Makers episodes =

The Dream Makers (Chinese: 志在四方) is a Singaporean television drama series. The story revolves around the lives of employees in a TV station, giving viewers a peek into what is behind the scenes in the entertainment world. It is told in two parts, the first being the mid-yeor anniversary drama celebrating 50 years of television, and the second coinciding MediaCorp's big move from Caldecott Hill to Mediapolis@one-north.

A total of 62 episodes have aired as of 18 January 2016 on Channel 8.

== Series overview ==
Season	Episodes	Originally released	
Season	Episodes	First released	Last released
1	30	June 24, 2013	August 2, 2013
2	32	December 4, 2015	January 18, 2016

== Episodes ==
=== The Dream Makers (2013) ===
No. overall	No. in season	Title	Original release date
1	1	"Episode 1"	June 24, 2013 PG
2	2	"Episode 2"	June 25, 2013 PG
3	3	"Episode 3"	June 26, 2013 PG
4	4	"Episode 4"	June 27, 2013 PG
5	5	"Episode 5"	June 28, 2013 PG
6	6	"Episode 6"	July 1, 2013 PG
7	7	"Episode 7"	July 2, 2013 PG
8	8	"Episode 8"	July 3, 2013 PG
9	9	"Episode 9"	July 4, 2013 PG
10	10	"Episode 10"	July 5, 2013 PG
11	11	"Episode 11"	July 8, 2013 PG
12	12	"Episode 12"	July 9, 2013 PG
13	13	"Episode 13"	July 10, 2013 PG
14	14	"Episode 14"	July 11, 2013 PG
15	15	"Episode 15"	July 12, 2013 PG
16	16	"Episode 16"	July 15, 2013 PG
17	17	"Episode 17"	July 16, 2013 PG
18	18	"Episode 18"	July 17, 2013 PG
19	19	"Episode 19"	July 18, 2013 PG
20	20	"Episode 20"	July 19, 2013 PG
21	21	"Episode 21"	July 22, 2013 PG
22	22	"Episode 22"	July 23, 2013 PG
23	23	"Episode 23"	July 24, 2013 PG
24	24	"Episode 24"	July 25, 2013 PG
25	25	"Episode 25"	July 26, 2013 PG
26	26	"Episode 26"	July 29, 2013 PG
27	27	"Episode 27"	July 30, 2013 PG
28	28	"Episode 28"	July 31, 2013; PG Some Sexual References
29	29	"Episode 29"	August 1, 2013; PG Some Sexual References
30	30	"Episode 30 (Finale)"	August 2, 2013 PG

=== The Dream Makers II (2015) ===
No. overall	No. in season	Title	Original release date
31	1	"Episode 1"	December 4, 2015 PG
32	2	"Episode 2"	December 7, 2015; PG Some Disturbing Scenes
33	3	"Episode 3"	December 8, 2015 PG
34	4	"Episode 4"	December 9, 2015 PG
35	5	"Episode 5"	December 10, 2015; PG Some Sexual References
36	6	"Episode 6"	December 11, 2015 PG
37	7	"Episode 7"	December 14, 2015 PG
38	8	"Episode 8"	December 15, 2015 PG
39	9	"Episode 9"	December 16, 2015 PG
40	10	"Episode 10"	December 17, 2015 PG
41	11	"Episode 11"	December 18, 2015 PG
42	12	"Episode 12"	December 21, 2015 PG
43	13	"Episode 13"	December 22, 2015 PG
44	14	"Episode 14"	December 23, 2015; PG Some Sexual References
45	15	"Episode 15"	December 24, 2015 PG
46	16	"Episode 16"	December 25, 2015; PG Some Disturbing Scenes
47	17	"Episode 17"	December 28, 2015 PG
48	18	"Episode 18"	December 29, 2015; PG Some Disturbing Scenes
49	19	"Episode 19"	December 30, 2015 PG
50	20	"Episode 20"	December 31, 2015; PG Some Disturbing Scenes
51	21	"Episode 21"	January 1, 2016; PG Some Disturbing Scenes
52	22	"Episode 22"	January 4, 2016 PG
53	23	"Episode 23"	January 5, 2016 PG
54	24	"Episode 24"	January 6, 2016 PG
55	25	"Episode 25"	January 7, 2016; PG Some Drug References
56	26	"Episode 26"	January 8, 2016; PG Some Drug References
57	27	"Episode 27"	January 11, 2016; PG Some Drug References
58	28	"Episode 28"	January 12, 2016; PG Some Disturbing Scenes
59	29	"Episode 29"	January 13, 2016; PG Some Disturbing Scenes
60	30	"Episode 30"	January 14, 2016; PG Some Disturbing Scenes
61	31	"Episode 31"	January 15, 2016; PG Some Disturbing Scenes
62	32	"Episode 32 (Finale)"	January 18, 2016; PG Some Disturbing Scenes
