= Ian Fang =

Chinese sex offender and actor (born 1989)

- 方威捷
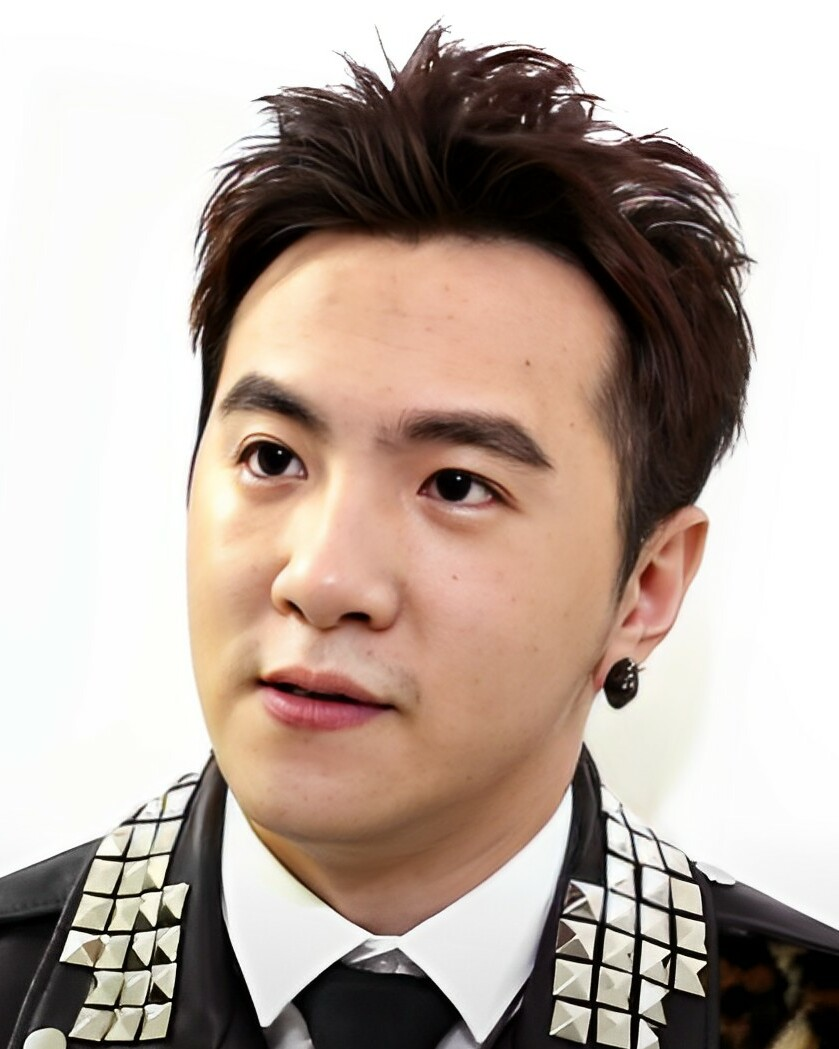
- Fang in May 2017
- Born: Fang Weijie; 13 December 1989 (age 36); Shanghai, China
- Education: Republic Polytechnic
- Occupations: Actor; dancer; host; rapper; acting teacher
- Years active: 2011–2025
- Notable work: Don't Stop Believin'; Goodbye Mr. Loser
- Awards: See list
- Musical career
- Genre: Mandopop
- Instrument: Vocals
- Years active: 2016–2025

Birth name
- Chinese: 方威捷
- Hanyu Pinyin: Fāng Wēijié
- Wade–Giles: Fāng Wei chieh

Stage name
- Traditional Chinese: 方偉傑
- Simplified Chinese: 方伟杰
- Hanyu Pinyin: Fāng Wěijié
- Wade–Giles: Fāng Wei chieh
- Criminal information
- Status: Incarcerated
- Conviction: Sexual penetration of a minor
- Criminal charges: Sexual penetration of a minor, harassment, obstruction of justice
- Penalty: 40 months' imprisonment

Ian Fang Weijie (born 13 December 1989; Chinese: 方威捷; pinyin: Fāng Wēijié) is a Chinese convicted child sex offender and former permanent resident of Singapore, where he was an actor and acting teacher.

Fang was named as one of Mediacorp's 8 Dukes of Caldecott Hill. In 2013, he portrayed a student who lost his grandmother and had to struggle for a living in the drama Don't Stop Believin'. Through that debut role, he was awarded the Best Newcomer Award at the annual Star Awards Ceremony. Fang also starred in the drama On the Fringe 2011 and the cast members of the drama later also appeared in the film Imperfect. Fang left Mediacorp in 2023.

In 2025, Fang was convicted in a Singaporean court after pleading guilty to sexually penetrating a minor. He was sentenced to 40 months' imprisonment and later had his permanent residency revoked.

== Early life ==
Fang was born in Shanghai, China. His parents divorced when he was four. He had been brought up by his grandmother before his mother moved him to Singapore in 2002.

== Career ==
Fang made his acting debut in the Singaporean television police drama C.L.I.F. in 2011, playing a rich kid who lands himself in trouble after single-handedly masterminding a series of bombings. He was also a production assistant for the medical drama The Oath produced by Wawa Pictures for Mediacorp.

In 2012, Fang made his film debut in Imperfect. The same year, he also starred in the television series Show Hand (alongside Christopher Lee) and Don't Stop Believin'.

In 2013, Fang was awarded the Best Newcomer award at Star Awards 2013. He also hosted his first travelogue My Working Holiday that depicted him visiting different countries to work in exchange for food and lodging, which earned him a nomination for the Best Info-Ed Host at Star Awards 20.

In 2014, Fang had a lead role in the Channel U series Served H.O.T.. In the same year, he was given a role in the basketball-themed movie Meeting the Giant, directed by Tay Ping Hui.

In 2016, Fang was nominated as the Best Supporting Actor in Star Awards 2016 as Chen Hao Wei in Tiger Mum which won Best Drama in 2016. He also made his debut as a rap artist and released his first single, "1st Attempt", featuring vocals from Sylvester Sim.

In 2017, Fang was nominated as the Best Supporting Actor in Star Awards as Lin Zi Jie in The Dream Job. He also released his second single "Still me" featuring Desmond Ng.

In 2018, Fang was nominated as the Best Supporting Actor in Star Awards as Shuai Ge in Till We Meet Again.

Fang had won two Star Awards for Top 10 Most Popular Male Artistes in 2015 and 2017 respectively.

On 27 April 2023, Fang announced he would not renew his contract with Mediacorp when it ended on 30 April. After leaving Mediacorp, Fang worked as an acting teacher at a child modelling school.

== Personal life ==
Since moving to Singapore, he went by a simplified Chinese form of Fang Weijie (simplified Chinese: 方伟杰; traditional Chinese: 方偉傑) and had debuted with this name. In 2022, he revealed that his birth name is Fang Weijie (Chinese: 方威捷) and would be using his birth name henceforth.

In 2015, Fang became a permanent resident of Singapore.

In 2019, a series of explicit text messages between actress Carrie Wong and Fang was leaked, suggesting a sexual affair between the two. The leaked texts also contained criticism towards fellow actor Lawrence Wong.

== Sexual offences ==
In May 2024, Fang, then 34, met a 15-year-old girl at an entertainment event and exchanged contact details with her. Throughout the following month, he had sex with her on nine occasions at various places. On August 3, the girl's mother made a police report after learning about the illicit sexual relationship between her and Fang.

=== Legal proceedings ===
On August 4, Fang was arrested and released on bail the following day. Despite the police's instructions, Fang reached out to the victim multiple times, even after she ceased contact with him. During at least one of those occasions, he urged her to convince her mother not to press charges against him and threatened to commit suicide if jailed.

On January 24, 2025, Fang was charged with sexually penetrating a 15-year-old minor on numerous occasions in 2024. He was also charged with obstruction of justice and harassment involving the same minor. He was sentenced to 40 months' imprisonment and began serving his sentence on 16 June 2025. The victim's family expressed dissatisfaction that Fang's sentence did not include caning and their intentions to sue him; social media users commenting on his case also questioned why he was not caned. Lawyers, however, explained that Fang's case was not covered by any law that would have sanctioned caning.

On 5 February 2026, following his sentencing, Fang's permanent residency in Singapore was revoked; he will be deported and barred from re-entering Singapore following the conclusion of his sentence. Two days later, Richard Siaw, Fang's victim's family's legal representative, announced that they had decided to withdraw the civil lawsuit against him.

== Filmography ==
=== Film ===
Year	Title	Role	Notes	Ref.
2012	Imperfect	Zach		
2013	Love...and Other Bad Habits	Darrell		
2014	Meeting the Giant	He Xiaodi		
2017	Goodbye Mr. Loser	Lin Yibai		

=== Television series ===
Year	Title	Role	Notes	Ref.
2011	C.L.I.F.	Luo Chaolong	Cameo	
2011	On The Fringe	Jason Liu		
2012	Rescue 995	Yuan Zhiwei	Cameo	
2012	Show Hand (注定)	Zhang Bisheng		
2012	Don't Stop Believin'	Bai Zhixiang		
2013	96°C Café	Liu Chuanzhi		
2013	The Dream Makers	Joey Zhou Yaozu		
2013	Sudden	Zhong Wentai		
2014	Served H.O.T. (烧。卖)	Owen Tan		
2014	World at Your Feet	Hong Dehai		
2015	Life Is Beautiful	Zai Zai		
2015	Tiger Mum	Chen Haowei		
2015	The Journey: Our Homeland	Wan Zicong		
2015	Life - Fear Not	Bai Zhixiang	Cameo	
2015	The Dream Makers II	Joey Zhou Yaozu		
2016	The Truth Seekers	Chen Guohui	Cameo	
2016	The Dream Job	Lin Zijie		
2016	Soul Reaper (勾魂使者)	Lin Guanghui		
2016	Hero	Zhang Weikang		
2017	Eat Already? 2	Ah Huat		
2017	Life Less Ordinary	Sol Li Ziyang		
2018	Till We Meet Again – Prequel (千年来说对不起-前传)	Zhu Bajie		
2018	Till We Meet Again (千年来说对不起)	Shuai Ge		
2019	Voyage Of Love (爱。起航)	Yang Jiahui		
2019	Hello Miss Driver (下一站，遇见)	Lin Yuxing		
2019	All Is Well – Singapore (你那边怎样，我这边OK)	Li Hao		
2019	True Lies (大话精)	Liu Dehua		
2020	Happy Prince (快乐王子)	Li DaWei		
2020	A Jungle Survivor (森林生存记)	Max		
2020	Mister Flower (花花公子)	Andy		
2021	Crouching Tiger Hidden Ghost	Xie Weixiang		
2021	Key Witness (关键证人)	Zheng Bi'de		
2021	The Heartland Hero	Satay King		
2021	Mr Zhou's Ghost Stories@Job Haunting	Sebastian		
2022	The Unbreakable Bond (寄生)	Zhuang Daoshen		
2023	Mr Zhou's Ghost Stories@Job Haunting II	Sebastian		
2024	Kill Sera Sera			

=== Variety show hosting ===
Year	Title	Notes	Ref.
2013	My Working Holiday (打工看世界)	Nominated – Best Info-ed Programme Host, Star Awards 20	
2014	My Star Guide 9 (我的导游是明星9)	Ningbo / Huangshan episodes	
2014	The Dukes' Theme Park Challenge (公子爱挑战)		
2015	My Star Guide 10 (我的导游是明星10)	Hunan episodes	

== Discography ==
=== Singles ===
Year	Title	Album	Label
2016	1st Attempt (featuring Sylvester Sim)	Non-album single	Independent
2017	Still Me (featuring Desmond Ng)	Non-album single	Independent
2018	Mr. Piggy	Non-album single	Independent

== Awards and nominations ==
Year	Ceremony	Category	Nominated work	Result	Ref.
2012	Star Awards	Favourite Male Character	On The Fringe (as Jason Liu)	Nominated	
2013	Star Awards	Best Newcomer	Don't Stop Believin' (as Bai Zhixiang)	Won	
2013	Star Awards	Rocket Award	Don't Stop Believin' (as Bai Zhixiang)	Nominated	
2013	Asian Television Awards	Best Actor in a Supporting Role	Don't Stop Believin' (as Bai Zhixiang)	Nominated	
2014	Star Awards	London Choco Roll Happiness Award	Sudden (as Zhong Wentai)	Nominated	
2014	Star Awards	Top 10 Most Popular Male Artistes	—N/a	Nominated	
2014	Star Awards	Best Info-Ed Programme Host	My Working Holiday	Nominated	
2014	Star Awards	Star Awards for Most Popular Regional Artiste (Indonesia)	—N/a	Nominated	
2014	Star Awards	Star Awards for Most Popular Regional Artiste (Malaysia)	—N/a	Nominated	
2015	Star Awards	Top 10 Most Popular Male Artistes	—N/a	Won	
2015	Star Awards	Favourite Onscreen Couple (with Kimberly Chia)	World at Your Feet (as Hong Dehai)	Nominated	
2015	Star Awards	Toggle Outstanding Duke Award	—N/a	Nominated	
2016	Star Awards	Best Supporting Actor	Tiger Mum (as Chen Haowei)	Nominated	
2016	Star Awards	Toggle Most Beloved Celebrity BFF Award (with Jeffrey Xu)	—N/a	Nominated	
2016	Fame Award 2016	Best Actor in a Supporting Role	The Journey: Our Homeland (as Wan Zicong)	Nominated	
2017	Star Awards	Top 10 Most Popular Male Artistes	—N/a	Won	
2017	Star Awards	London Choco Roll Happiness Award	The Dream Job (as Lin Zijie)	Won	
2017	Star Awards	Bioskin Healthiest Hair Award	The Dream Job (as Lin Zijie)	Nominated	
2017	Star Awards	Best Supporting Actor	The Dream Job (as Lin Zijie)	Nominated	
2018	Star Awards	Best Theme Song	Life Less Ordinary (as Sol Li Ziyang)	Nominated	
2019	Star Awards	Best Supporting Actor	Till We Meet Again (as Shuai Ge)	Nominated	
2021	Star Awards	Best Supporting Actor	All is Well-Singapore (as Li Hao)	Nominated	
2021	Star Awards	Bioskin Most Charismatic Artiste Award	—N/a	Nominated	
2021	Star Awards	Top 10 Most Popular Male Artistes	—N/a	Nominated	
2024	Star Awards	Top 10 Most Popular Male Artistes	—N/a	Nominated	
