= Pamelyn Chee =

Singaporean actress (born 1984)

- Born: 13 March 1984 (age 42); Singapore
- Education: Victoria Junior College
- Occupations: Actress; photographer

Chinese name
- Traditional Chinese: 齊騛
- Simplified Chinese: 齐騛
- Hanyu Pinyin: Qǐ Fēi

Pamelyn Chee (born 13 March 1984) is a Singaporean actress and photographer.

== Early life ==
Chee graduated from Victoria Junior College's theatre studies and drama programme. After completing her studies, she began a career in theatre and appeared in a number of local television series before quitting a local law school.

== Career ==
Chee was discovered on YouTube by Heidi Levitt for Wayne Wang's TIFF feature Princess of Nebraska. Besides English, Chee also speaks fluent Mandarin and Cantonese, and travels between Asia and the United States for work.

Chee played the titular role in HBO Asia's Grace, headlining the show with Russell Wong. This show was nominated for 8 awards at the Asian Television Awards.

She also starred alongside Joan Chen and Chin Han, Don Hany, and Michael Dorman in HBO Asia's Serangoon Road. The show was nominated for an AACTA Award for Best Television Drama Series in Australia.

In 2021, she appeared in Eddie Huang's Boogie by Focus Features. She was also in the feature sequel Beyond Skyline, alongside Frank Grillo and Iko Uwais. She also guest-starred on Freeform's Stitchers.

Chee is also a photographer for Getty Images and is based in Los Angeles.

== Filmography ==
=== Film ===
Year	Title	Role	Notes	Ref.
2007	The Princess of Nebraska			
2008	Pulau Hantu	June		
2015	3688	Teresa		
2015	Prescient	Anna / Emma		
2016	The Faith of Anna Waters	May Wong		
2017	Beyond Skyline	Kanya		
2019	Interface	Operator 749	Short film	
2021	Boogie	Mrs. Chin		

=== Television series ===
Year	Title	Role	Notes	Ref.
2008	The Little Nyonya	Libby		
2008	Beach.Ball.Babes			
2009	Together	Wang Yanxia		
2009	Your Hand in Mine	Ah Bing		
2010	Point of Entry	Vivian De Cruz	Guest	
2010	Unriddle	Cynthia		
2010	The Pupil	Pam Tay	Guest	
2011	Point of Entry 2	Vivian De Cruz	Guest	
2011	Perfect Deception			
2011	A Song to Remember	Su Yingying		
2012	Point of Entry 3	Vivian De Cruz		
2012	Beyond	Shen Meichen		
2012	The Quarters	Tao Hualing		
2013	Serangoon Road	Su Ling	HBO Asia	
2014	Grace		HBO Asia	
2015	2025	Elizabeth Pang		
2016	Stitchers	Mei Ling	S2 Ep.6	
