= The Dream Makers (TV series) =

Singaporean television series

- 志在四方
- Genre: Drama; Media Industry; Romance; Office Politics
- Written by: Rebecca Leow
- Directed by: Wong Foong Hwee; Loo Yin Kam; Lin Mingzhe
- Starring: Zoe Tay; Chen Liping; Rui En; Qi Yuwu; Chen Hanwei; Rebecca Lim; Shaun Chen; Desmond Tan; Jeanette Aw
- Opening theme: 幸福不难 by Serene Koong
- Ending theme: 十万毫升泪水 by Tanya Chua 交换 by Jacky Chew
- Country of origin: Singapore
- Original language: Chinese
- No. of episodes: 30 (list of episodes)

Production
- Producer: Winnie Wong
- Running time: approx. 45 minutes (exc. advertisements)

Original release
- Network: MediaCorp Channel 8
- Release: 24 June – 2 August 2013

Related
- The Dream Makers II (2015)

The Dream Makers
- Traditional Chinese: 志在四方
- Simplified Chinese: 志在四方
Transcriptions
Standard Mandarin
- Hanyu Pinyin: zhí zaí sí fáng

The Dream Makers (Chinese: 志在四方) is a 30-episode drama serial that aired on MediaCorp Channel 8 from 24 June 2013 to 2 August 2013. It stars Zoe Tay, Chen Liping, Jeanette Aw, Rui En, Qi Yuwu, Chen Hanwei, Rebecca Lim, Shaun Chen & Desmond Tan for the casts of this series.

== Plot ==
Zhou Weiyun heads a variety channel. The aloof Weiyun appears distant all the time. Weiyun lives with her demented mother, and younger brother's family. Although Weiyun's mother, Yalian, has severe dementia and doesn't remember who she is, Weiyun is the only one filial to her. Weiyun's brother, Jialong is unable to hold down a job and hides the fact that he is financially dependent on Weiyun from his wife. Weiyun's sister-in-law, Xu Guixiang is a housewife who grouses against Weiyun for staying with them in their already small flat, burdening the family. For Yalian's sake, Weiyun puts up with it for the general good.

Luo Zhiming is Weiyun's boyfriend and his job takes him to different countries all the time, leaving them little time together. Friends suspect that Zhiming is a married man but Weiyun firmly believes that he will not deceive her. His marital status is finally revealed to Weiyun on one occasion. Reeling from the shock, Weiyun realizes that she has been the third party in the dark for 4 years. Weiyun initiates a breakup, but Zhiming pleads with her not to leave him, claiming that he has a strained relationship with his wife and will divorce her. Caught between morality and love, Weiyun waits for him helplessly. When rumours of Weiyun being the third party spreads and fingers point to her as the mistress, she suffers in silence. Finally, Zhiming tells Weiyun that he and his wife, Shanshan are divorced, however, he has to go over to China to plead with Shanshan's father (who is a mafia boss) to agree to the divorce. However, he gets kidnapped by the mafia and most likely is killed. Weiyun is not able to contact him, and finally believes that he didn't want to marry her anymore. She slides into the abyss of misery. It is at this time that Weiyun's good friend and partner, Yu Fan, enters into her world.

Yu Fan is a Professor of Psychology cum eloquent celebrity host. He hosts a programme that resonates with the people, thereby guaranteeing high TV ratings. Yu Fan has no dearth of women around him, yet none has captured his heart. He is suspected of being gay, and that the women surrounding him are only a smokescreen. The truth is, Yu Fan had a wife, Yun Xiaoqi who contracted depression. Sapped from taking care of her and after quarreling with her one-day, his wife died from knocking her head into an ornament at their house. Thereafter, Yu Fan fears entering into another relationship out of remorse. To cover up his guilt, he pretends to be a happy-go-lucky person. Ever since he witnesses Weiyun hurt by love, his empathy towards her turns into love. Unfortunately, the fear of being trapped in the web of love again makes them determined to suppress their love for each other. He can only eye her with interest. Yu Fan's reputation takes a beating after reporters reveal what he did to Xiaoqi. The ratings for his programme drop drastically and his career hits rock bottom. Weiyun faces tremendous pressure and is threatened by her subordinate. Weiyun ponders over the meaning of life, and no longer wishes to waste the rest of her life struggling hard for her job. She finally confesses to Yu Fan that she is willing to give up everything to lead an ordinary life.

Reigning supreme in the drama channel is Yao-Zhu Kangli. Nicknamed “Drama Queen”, her speech and life are ever so dramatic. Being a perfectionist makes her life tormenting. Yao Jianguo (Guo Liang), Kangli's husband, is a well-known plastic surgeon who often cheats on her. Kangli is aware of Jianguo's philandering ways but puts up with it as long as he loves only her. They have a six-year-old autistic son Naonao. To save face, Kangli hides his condition from everyone and bears the brunt of Naonao's unpredictable behavior by herself. Kangli struggles to juggle her career with her responsibilities as a wife, mother and daughter-in-law. Her only source of comfort is her elderly mother-in-law who is apologetic over her son's behavior.

Unknown to Kangli, Jianguo has felt like a failure due to Naonao's condition and subconsciously pushes responsibility for caring for Naonao onto his wife. His extramarital affairs were merely a veiled attempt to escape his unhappy home life. Kangli suffers a breakdown when she discovers that Jianguo has fallen for his lover and tries to salvage the marriage. Instead, Jianguo wants a divorce so that he can be with his lover. However Jianguo's mother (Zhu Xiufeng) had long saw through her son's escapist attitude and opposes his decision.

With help from his good friend, Yu Fan, Jianguo gradually regains his old self and makes a great effort to win Kangli's heart back. Unable to forgive Jianguo, Kangli becomes cynical. She is particularly hostile towards Weiyun who has been accused of being a marriage-breaker, and makes many enemies. However, it is Weiyun who gets Kangli out of trouble when she keeps making mistakes at work. Kangli feels her colleague's concern and begins to let her armour down. Finally, after losing her position, she sees the light. For the sake of her son, she chooses to accept the repentant Jianguo. The family is reunited, and she settles down to being a contented housewife devoted to her husband, mother-in-law and son.

Super career women face pressure from all fronts while the young struggle in their career. Zhao Fei Er is a very hardworking second-tier to third-tier artiste waiting hard for her big break. Fei Er comes from a broken family; her mother is an adulteress while her father, Zhao De, is a useless bum who drinks and gambles. The only person she considers a family member is the paternal grandfather (Zhang Wei) who dotes on her. Fei Er vows to leave her past life behind and works very hard in her acting job. Finally, she rises to become a first-tier actress, thanks to Kangli's recognition of her talent. Jason is Fei Er's boyfriend from her university days. An outstanding ad director, he ardently supports her dream. In order to take care of, and protect his girlfriend, Jason becomes a freelance director at the TV station. Fei Er starts to change after her new-found fame. An inferiority complex makes her hide the truth of their relationship. She even hides the fact that Zhao De is a drunkard and her paternal grandfather is living in an old folks’ home from the media. Fei Er's hectic schedule leaves her no time to look after her grandfather. She has no choice but to place him in an old folks’ home. When her grandfather is critically ill and dies, Fei Er is in the midst of filming and fails to attend his funeral. She feels guilty and this makes her even more determined to be successful. It pains Jason to see Fei Er fighting hard to gain fame and fortune. Their relationship takes an unexpected turn because of opposing views.

At this time, Fang Tonglin, producer of Variety Unit, falls in love with Jason at first sight, the reason being that he looks uncannily like her late faithful father. Tonglin and Jason hit it off real well. She supports him in many ways after finding out about his problematic relationship. Her unwavering admiration for Jason's disregard for conventions ends in a one-sided love affair that she tries very hard to sustain. A stroke of luck lands Tonglin a spot on TV which is widely received by viewers and she even gains an acting role. By now a celebrity, Fei Er views Tonglin's presence as a threat. After Tonglin's transformation, Du Zhanpeng, Head of Artiste Liaison Unit, makes the surprise move of courting her. A product of Singapore's elite system, Zhanpeng has never tasted failure. Touched by his earnest courtship, Tonglin accepts his love.

Gao Jian, a wealthy heir, has eyes for Fei Er. He showers her with a number of advertising contracts to endorse products, sponsors her programmes, chauffeurs her around in a luxury car, provides a listening ear to her and stands up for her secretly. His actions touched Fei Er tremendously. As she gradually realizes that hard work is not enough to get one far in showbiz, Fei Er learns to curry favour to establish relationships and leans on Gao Jian as her backer. Jason senses that he is drifting apart from Fei Er. On the other hand, he seems to click with Tonglin because they share the same views. Unable to contain his anger anymore, Jason confronts Fei Er on her relationship with the heir. Fei Er is incensed, and decides to break off with Jason to be with Gao Jian.

This is a big blow to Jason and he sinks into misery. Tonglin's tender loving care of him finally makes Zhanpeng see that his girlfriend's heart is with Jason. The bitter Zhanpeng gives up on Tonglin and because of her, his friendship with Jason is strained. Not only is Zhanpeng's love life in the pits, his personal life is in shambles after a legal suit ruins him. At this juncture, Xiao Lixia, enters his life. A sales manager, Lixia is Zhanpeng's good friend.

Jason is devastated after being jilted by Fei Er. Life has totally lost its meaning for him. With Tonglin constantly by his side encouraging and consoling him, he picks himself up again. For a period of time, he devotes himself into his work, produces a number of commendable programmes, wins the award for Best Director in consecutive years and receives offers from international movie directors. On finding out that Tonglin is secretly in love with him, he is touched and accepts her love. Tonglin is finally together with Jason. Their relationship blossoms. However, Tonglin senses that, compared with Fei Er, Jason is less loving towards her. This is especially obvious when Fei Er is in their presence, and Jason somehow behaves awkwardly. Tonglin feels that she is always placed in a helpless situation to the extent of having to betray her own principles. Kangli and Weiyun, who have been hardened by their life experiences, advises Jason not to follow in their footsteps of losing himself. Jason starts to examine his life and decides to rein himself in before it is too late.

The Gao family cannot accept Fei Er. Gao Jian is under pressure to break off with Fei Er and marry a rich man's daughter. Fei Er loses hope in herself and turns malicious. A string of scandalous news causes her popularity to go downhill. Feeling extremely empty and succumbing under the strain of criticisms, she knows that remaining in Singapore is no longer possible. She claims to have gone to Hong Kong to develop her career, but ends up miserably as an extra. Estranged from her kin and kith, and suffering untold loneliness, Fei Er regrets losing herself for the sake of fame and fortune. She still loves Jason, but considers herself unworthy of him. The sight of Fei Er in such a sorry state pierces his heart... Tonglin is perfectly aware that Jason has never stopped loving Fei Er. She is determined to fulfil his wish, but tells him that if he ever needs her, he should know where to look for her. Faced with two women who have an emotional hold on him, who will his heart go to?

== Cast ==
- Zoe Tay as Zhou Weiyun 周薇云
- Chen Liping as Zhu Kangli 朱康莉
- Jeanette Aw as Zhao Fei'er 赵非儿
- Rui En as Fang Tonglin 方彤琳
- Qi Yuwu as Jason Lam 蓝钦辉
- Shaun Chen as Du Zhanpeng 杜展鹏
- Chen Hanwei as Yu Fan 余凡
- Rebecca Lim as Lisa Xiao Lixia 萧丽霞
- Wang Yuqing as Producer Qin 秦监制
- Li Wenhai as Mr Chong
- Dawn Yeoh as Xie Liuxin 谢柳欣
- Joey Feng 冯瑾瑜 as Catherine
- 汤灵倢 as Chen Yunzhi 陈云芝
- Seth Ang 翁兴昂 as Lawrence
- Silver Ang 洪子惠 as Lin Peijun 林佩君
- Vincent Ng as Ding Wei 丁威
- Jayley Woo as Rain Pei Xiaoqing 裴晓晴
- Ian Fang as Joey Zhou Yaozu 周耀祖
- Richard Low as Zhao De 赵德
- Dennis Chew as Fang Yuanren 方元仁
- Guo Liang as Yao Jianguo
- Alston Yeo Jun Yi as Yao Zitao
- Desmond Tan as Gao Jian 高建
- Desmond Shen as Luo Zhiming 罗智明
- Zong Zijie as Edmund
- May Phua
- Zhu Xiufeng
- Chen Huihui

== Original soundtrack ==
The theme song and sub theme song for the drama series “The Dream Makers” are performed by Singaporean female songwriters Serene Koong and Tanya Chua respectively.

The theme song 幸福不难 is written, produced and performed by Koong, while the sub-theme song is 十万毫升泪水 by Chua. Both songs became extremely popular amongst audiences and grew in popularity together with the success of the drama series. 幸福不难 won the Best Theme Song at the 2014 Star Awards and was nominated for “Best Theme Song” at the 2014 Asian Television Awards. 十万毫升泪水 won Best Local Composition at the 18th Singapore Hit Awards.

== Trivia ==
- This drama was made in commemoration of the golden jubilee of both Singapore television and MediaCorp Channel 8.
- Dawn Yeoh's comeback series after Daddy at Home and her first villainous role.
- Zoe Tay, Chen Hanwei, Dennis Chew, Guo Liang and Rebecca Lim performed skits during Star Awards 20 Show 1, alongside Mark Lee. The show Truth In The City is also used for the Favourite Male Character segment.

== Accolades ==
The series, at the time, broke the record for having the most nominations at 19, surpassing The Little Nyonya in 2009, which garnered 16.

At the time, the series also tied with The Little Nyonya for having the most wins in the award ceremony of 2014, both with nine; these records would remain held until two years later, where the second season topped both records with 26 and 12, respectively.

| Year | Award | Category | Nominee | Result | Ref |
|---|---|---|---|---|---|
| 2014 | Star Awards | Young Talent Award | Alston Yeo 杨峻毅 | Nominated | |
| 2014 | Star Awards | Best Theme Song | 幸福不难 by Serene Koong | Won | |
| 2014 | Star Awards | Best Programme Promo 最佳宣传短片 | Doreen Neo Min Qi 梁敏琪 | Nominated | |
| 2014 | Star Awards | Best Director 最佳导演 | Wong Foong Hwee 黄芬菲 | Won | |
| 2014 | Star Awards | Best Director 最佳导演 | Loo Yin Kam 卢燕金 | Nominated | |
| 2014 | Star Awards | Best Screenplay 最佳剧本 | Rebecca Leow 洪汐 | Won | |
| 2014 | Star Awards | Favourite Female Character | Jeanette Aw | Won | |
| 2014 | Star Awards | Favourite Female Character | Rui En | Nominated | |
| 2014 | Star Awards | Favourite Female Character | Zoe Tay | Nominated | |
| 2014 | Star Awards | Favourite Onscreen Couple (Drama) | Qi Yuwu and Jeanette Aw | Won | |
| 2014 | Star Awards | Favourite Onscreen Couple (Drama) | Qi Yuwu and Rui En | Top three | |
| 2014 | Star Awards | Best Actor | Qi Yuwu | Nominated | |
| 2014 | Star Awards | Best Actor | Chen Hanwei | Nominated | |
| 2014 | Star Awards | Best Actress | Chen Liping | Won | |
| 2014 | Star Awards | Best Actress | Jeanette Aw | Nominated | |
| 2014 | Star Awards | Best Actress | Rui En | Nominated | |
| 2014 | Star Awards | Best Supporting Actor | Dennis Chew | Nominated | |
| 2014 | Star Awards | Best Supporting Actor | Shaun Chen | Nominated | |
| 2014 | Star Awards | Best Supporting Actor | Guo Liang | Won | |
| 2014 | Star Awards | Best Supporting Actress | Rebecca Lim | Won | |
| 2014 | Star Awards | Top Rated Drama Serial 2013 最高收视率电视剧 2013 | —N/a | Nominated | |
| 2014 | Star Awards | Best Drama Serial | —N/a | Won | |

| Preceded by Pillow Talk (Singaporean TV series); 2012-13 | Star Awards for Best Drama Serial; The Dream Makers (season 1); 2013-14 | Succeeded by The Journey: Tumultuous Times; 2014-15 |
