= Star Awards 2014 =

Singaporean television awards

Star Awards 20 红星大奖20
- Sponsored by: René Furterer Paris; Calbee; Ricola; Simmons; Asian Skin Solutions
- Date: 20 April 2014; 27 April 2014 - Show 2
- Location: Show 1: Mediacorp TV Theatre; Walk of Fame, Show 2 and Post-show: Suntec Singapore International Convention and Exhibition Centre
- Country: Singapore
- Presented by: BottomSlim
- Hosted by: Chen Shucheng; Samuel Chong; Dasmond Koh; Vivian Lai; Lee Teng; Pornsak; Zhang Wei; Zhou Ruzhu; Youyi; Quan Yi Fong; Guo Liang; Ben Yeo; Chen Ning; Jeffrey Xu

Highlights
- Most awards: Drama: The Dream Makers (9); Variety/Info-ed: The Joy Truck; Star Awards 2013 (2 each)
- Most nominations: Drama: The Dream Makers (21); Variety/Info-ed: Finding U (6)
- Best Drama: The Dream Makers
- Best Variety Show: The Joy Truck
- All-time Favourite Artiste: Chen Hanwei; Bryan Wong
- Website: "Official website". Archived from the original on 18 March 2014.

Television/radio coverage
- Network: Mediacorp Channel 8 Mediacorp Channel U
- Runtime: 180 mins (both presentations); 60 mins (Walk of Fame and Post-show)

Star Awards 20 (also SA20, Chinese: 红星大奖 20) was a double television award ceremony which was held in Singapore. It is part of the annual Star Awards organised by Mediacorp for the two free-to-air channels, Mediacorp Channels 8 and U. The twentieth installment of Star Awards was broadcast live on Channel 8, on 20 and 27 April 2014. The first ceremony was held at the Mediacorp TV Theatre while the second ceremony was held at Suntec Singapore International Convention and Exhibition Centre. These ceremonies were also broadcast on 8 International and the second ceremony on Toggle, Astro AEC (SD) and Astro Quan Jia HD (HD).

The ceremony celebrated its 20th year, hence the original title of Star Awards 2014 was renamed. The Dream Makers won nine awards, including Best Drama Serial, in one of the biggest number of nominations at the time with 21; they were tied with The Little Nyonya in 2009, which also had nine awards.

== Programme details ==
Date	Shows	Time	Channel	Simulcast on	Venue
5 April 2014 to 26 April 2014	Star Awards 20 Pre-show	10.30pm to 10.45pm	Mediacorp Channel 8	—N/a	Studio
20 April 2014	Star Awards 20 Show 1	7pm to 10pm	Mediacorp Channel 8	Mediacorp 8i	Mediacorp TV Theatre
27 April 2014	Star Awards 20 Walk of Fame	5.30pm to 6.30pm	Mediacorp Channel 8	Mediacorp 8i	Suntec Convention Centre Main Atrium (Level 1)
27 April 2014	Star Awards 20 Show 2	7pm to 10pm	Mediacorp Channel 8	Toggle; Mediacorp 8i Astro AEC; Astro Quan Jia HD	Suntec Convention Centre Hall 601-604
27 April 2014	Star Awards 20 Post Show Party	10pm to 11pm	Mediacorp Channel U	Mediacorp 8i	Suntec Convention Centre (Level 6)

== Winners and nominees ==
Unless otherwise stated, winners are listed first, highlighted in boldface. A ^{1} next to the nomination indicate that a representative will collect the award in place of the nominee.

=== Show 1 ===
The first show was broadcast live on 20 April 2014 at the Mediacorp TV Theatre in Caldecott Hill. The show opened at 7.00pm with a three-minute-long parody skit of The Dream Makers before snippets of the host introductions were played followed by Chen Shucheng declaring the start of the award ceremony.

**Young Talent Award**: **Lyn Oh Ling En – I'm in Charge as Wang Jieshan 王洁珊**; Alston Yeo Jun Yi – The Dream Makers as Naonao 闹闹; Chloe Ng Ying En – The Journey: A Voyage as Zhang Huiniang (younger) 小蕙娘; Ivan Lo – The Journey: A Voyage as Zhang Dong'en (younger) 小东恩; Tan Shi Ya – Love at Risk as Lin Jialin 林佳霖	**Best Theme Song**: **Serene Koong – The Dream Makers – 《幸福不难》** ^{1}; Alfred Sim – The Journey: A Voyage – 《家乡》; Da Feng Chui and Romeo Tan – Sudden – 《骤变》; Huang Li Hui – Beyond – 《呼吸》; Wei En – 96°C Café 96 °C – 《啡情歌》
**Best Director**: **Wong Foong Hwee – The Dream Makers** ^{1}; **Chong Liung Man – The Journey: A Voyage**; **Leong Lye Lin – Sudden**; Loo Yin Kam – The Dream Makers; Wong Kuang Yong – Gonna Make It	**Best Screenplay**: **Rebecca Leow – The Dream Makers**; Ng Kah Huay – Gonna Make It; Ang Eng Tee – The Journey: A Voyage; Phang Kai Yee – Beyond; Seah Choon Guan and Tang Yeow – C.L.I.F. 2
**Best Variety Producer**: **Gan Bee Khim – The Joy Truck**; **Mandy Tan – Say It!**; **Lim Shiong Chiang – Star Awards 2013**; Khow Hwai Teng – Stir It Up; Kang Lay See – Finding U	**Best Variety Research Writer**: **Lim Kar Yee – The Joy Truck**; Lam Yen Fong – Stir It Up; Ng Jin Puay – SPD Charity Show 2013; Teo Kim Kee – Singapore Children’s Society Charity Show; Wong Eng Hong – Laughing Out Loud
**Best Programme Promo**: **Kee Chee Wee – Channel 8 - TV50**; Doreen Neo Min Qi – The Dream Makers; Loo Li Min – Beyond (Campaign); Terence Lee Ji Long – Start Up; He Jiayin – Hey Gorgeous	**Best Cameraman**: **Ler Leong Poh – Street Smart 2**; Thong Weng Leong – Volkswagen Holiday on Wheels - Johor Volkswagen; William Tan – The Joy Truck; Chris Siew – My Star Guide 8 - Australia; Lai Siew Leong – Good Man Good Food - Malaysia
**Best Set Design**: **Ahyak Yahya^{1} – Star Awards 2013 Show 2**; Tay Siu Whye – Campus SuperStar 2013; Mohamed Bin Abdul Rahim – SPD Charity Show 2013; Cynthia Nora Oh – Stir It Up; Ahmed Zubair Bin Abdul Aziz – Lunar New Year’s Eve Special 2013	**Best Editing (Entertainment Programmes)**: **Cynthia Chia – Finding U (Episode 10)**; Amanda Wang – Finding U (Episode 2); Low Li Lian – Good Man Good Food (Episode 1); Eu Chuin Fang – Style Check In Series 2 (Episode 6); Seah Lee Yan – Project Dream Home (Episode 11)

=== Popularity awards ===
**Favourite Male Character**: **Elvin Ng – I'm in Charge as Ah Wei** 阿威; Aloysius Pang – I'm in Charge as Wang Jiahao 王家豪; Desmond Tan –The Journey: A Voyage as Hong Shi 洪石; Romeo Tan – Sudden as Fang Qi Liang 方启亮; Xu Bin – Gonna Make It as Oscar	**Favourite Female Character**: **Jeanette Aw – The Dream Makers as Zhao Fei Er** 赵非儿; Joanne Peh – The Journey: A Voyage as Zhang Hui Niang 张蕙娘; Rebecca Lim – Sudden as Guo Wei Qian 郭玮茜; Rui En – The Dream Makers as Fang Tong Lin 方彤琳; Zoe Tay – The Dream Makers as Zhou Wei Yun 周薇芸
**Favourite Onscreen Couple**: **Qi Yuwu ^{2} and Jeanette Aw – The Dream Makers**; Li Nanxing and Rui En – C.L.I.F. 2; Romeo Tan and Rui En – Sudden; Xu Bin and Julie Tan – Gonna Make It; Qi Yuwu and Rui En – The Dream Makers

==== Most Popular Regional Artiste Award ====
The Most Popular Regional Artiste Award was newly introduced this year, where regional fans voted as part of its glitz and glamour by casting their votes online. Up to four awards are up for grabs, based on the four territories, namely China, Malaysia, Indonesia and Cambodia.

Most Popular Regional Artiste
Indonesia	China
**Rui En**; Chen Liping; Desmond Tan; Edwin Goh; Elvin Ng; Ian Fang; Jeanette Aw; Joanne Peh; Julie Tan; Kate Pang; Li Nanxing; Paige Chua; Pierre Png; Qi Yuwu; Rebecca Lim; Romeo Tan; Shaun Chen; Tay Ping Hui; Yvonne Lim; Zoe Tay	**Yvonne Lim**; Chen Hanwei; Chen Liping; Christopher Lee; Desmond Tan; Elvin Ng; Guo Liang; Jeanette Aw; Joanne Peh; Julie Tan; Li Nanxing; Priscelia Chan; Qi Yuwu; Rebecca Lim; Romeo Tan; Rui En; Tay Ping Hui; Xiang Yun; Zhang Zhenxuan; Zoe Tay
Malaysia	Cambodia
**Rui En**; Bryan Wong; Chen Hanwei; Chen Liping; Tong Bing Yu; Christopher Lee; Elvin Ng; Ian Fang; Jeanette Aw; Joanne Peh; Julie Tan; Li Nanxing; Pierre Png; Qi Yuwu; Rebecca Lim; Romeo Tan; Shaun Chen; Tay Ping Hui; Xu Bin; Zoe Tay	**Jeanette Aw**; Chen Hanwei; Christopher Lee; Cynthia Koh; Elvin Ng; Joanne Peh; Kate Pang; Li Nanxing; Pan Lingling; Pierre Png; Rui En; Shaun Chen; Tay Ping Hui; Terence Cao; Tracy Lee; Yao Wenlong; Yvonne Lim; Zhang Yaodong; Zheng Geping; Zoe Tay

==== Special awards ====
The results for Social Media Award are based on the calculations from three international social media analysis systems, which measures the social media engagement of qualifying nominees. They must be active on at least one of the following platforms in order to qualify for the award: Facebook, Twitter and Instagram.

**Social Media Award**	**Jeanette Aw**

The Rocket award, first introduced in 2010, was featured to the artiste with the most improvement in the performance of his/her respective field of profession for the past year.

**Rocket Award**	**Priscelia Chan**

==== Viewership awards ====
**Top Rated Drama Serial 2013**	**C.L.I.F. 2**
**Top Rated Variety Series 2013**	**Where the Queue Starts 4**

1. Winnie Wong (producer of The Dream Makers) represented Koong and Wong (who is unable to come to the ceremony due to her hospitalization) to collect the Best Theme Song and Best Director awards, respectively.
2. Joanne Peh represented Qi to collect the Favourite Onscreen Couple award.

=== Show 2 ===
The second show was broadcast live on 27 April 2014 at the Suntec Singapore Convention and Exhibition Centre.

==== Professionally judged awards ====
**Best Drama Serial 最佳电视剧**: **The Dream Makers**; The Journey: A Voyage; Beyond; C.L.I.F. 2; 96°C Café	**Best Info-ed Programme**: **Borders**; Big Factories 2: Made by Singapore!; Smart @ Work; Tuesday Report - The Towkays; Tuesday Report - Where We Connect 2
**Best Variety Programme**: **The Joy Truck**; Campus SuperStar 2013; Counter Fake; Finding U; Say It!	**Best Variety Special**: **Star Awards 2013**; Celebrate TV50; Remembering Huang Wen Yong; Singapore Children’s Society Charity Show; SPD Charity Show 2013
**Best Actor**: **Pierre Png – The Journey: A Voyage as Hei Long 黑龙**; Bryan Wong – Gonna Make It as Ah Man 阿满; Qi Yuwu – The Dream Makers as Jason Lam; Chen Hanwei – The Dream Makers as Yu Fan 余凡; Terence Cao – The Journey: A Voyage as Zhang Guangda 张广达	**Best Actress**: **Chen Liping – The Dream Makers as Yao-Zhu Kangli 姚朱康莉**; Jeanette Aw – The Dream Makers as Zhao Fei'er 赵非儿; Rebecca Lim – Sudden as Guo Weiqian 郭玮茜 and Huang Yixin 黄逸欣; Chris Tong – The Journey: A Voyage as Bai Mingzhu 白明珠; Rui En – The Dream Makers as Fang Tonglin 方彤琳
**Best Supporting Actor**: **Guo Liang – The Dream Makers as Yao Jianguo 姚建国**; Dennis Chew – The Dream Makers as Fang Yuanren 方元仁; Shaun Chen – The Dream Makers as Du Zhanpeng 杜展鹏; Zhang Zhen Huan – Break Free as Ye Zhi Bin 叶志斌; Jeffrey Xu – Marry Me as Dave Xu Xiaodong 徐小东	**Best Supporting Actress**: **Rebecca Lim – The Dream Makers as Lisa Xiao Lixia 萧丽霞**; Priscelia Chan – The Journey: A Voyage as Han Xiuxiang 韩秀香; Aileen Tan – C.L.I.F. 2 as Seetoh Yan 司徒燕; Xiang Yun – Beyond as Zhang Cuiyan 张翠燕; Hong Hui Fang – Love at Risk as Fu Meili (Beauty Foo) 符美丽
**Best Variety Show Host**: **Quan Yi Fong – Finding U**; Pornsak – The Joy Truck; Kym Ng – Finding U; Vivian Lai – Say It!; Guo Liang – Counter Fake	**Best Info-ed Programme Host**: **Cavin Soh – Let’s Cook**; Lee Teng – Big Factories 2: Made by Singapore!; Ian Fang – My Working Holiday; Youyi – Smart @ Work; Jerry Yeo – Big Factories 2: Made by Singapore!
**Best News Story**: **Lim Wee Leng – Little India Riot**; Chng Kheng Leng – Taxi Booking Apps; Evelyn Lam Li Ting – Online Affairs Website to Launch in Singapore; Lip Kwok Wai – HDB 5 Room Resale Flat Exceed $900,000; Ng Lian Cheong – NEA to Fine Town Council after Mosquito Larvae Found in Water Tank
**Best Current Affairs Story**: **Yap Li Ling and Goh Chye Kim – Frontline – Face to Face with Typhoon Haiyan**; **Christopher Yeo, Grace Yang Hsiao Hung, Chan Wai Hoe, Song Jia Jia and Liu Lin Yi – Focus – The Impact of PM Lee's National Day Rally speech reaches overseas**; Grace Yang Hsiao Hung, Chan Wai Hoe and Song Jia Jia – Focus – Haze in Singapore; Soh Bee Lan and Yap Li Ling – Frontline – Dementia; Ng Toh Heong – Money Week – Used car dealers badly hit by tighter loan restrictions

==== Special awards ====
The All-Time Favourite Artiste is a special achievement award given out to artiste(s) who have achieved a maximum of 10 popularity awards over 10 years. Top 10 winning years the recipients were awarded together are highlighted in boldface.

**All Time Favourite Artiste**	**Chen Hanwei**	1995 | 1996 | 2000 | 2001 | **2005** | **2009** | **2010** | **2011** | **2012** | **2013**
**All Time Favourite Artiste**	**Bryan Wong**	1998 | 1999 | **2005** | 2006 | 2007 | **2009** | **2010** | **2011** | **2012** | **2013**

==== Awards eligible for voting ====
**BottomSlim Sexiest Legs Award**: **Paige Chua**; Priscelia Chan; Sora Ma; Kym Ng; Julie Tan	**Asian Skin Solutions Most Radiant Skin Award**: **Rebecca Lim**; Vivian Lai; Sora Ma; Quan Yi Fong; Jayley Woo
**London Choco Roll Happiness Award**: **Xu Bin – The Recruit Diaries as Qin Sheng 秦胜**; Ian Fang – Sudden as Zhong Wentai 钟文泰; Elvin Ng – I'm in Charge as Ah Wei 阿威; Julie Tan – 96°C Café as Tang Yuchen 唐雨晨; Romeo Tan – 96°C Café as Tang Weida 唐伟大

==== Top 10 awards ====
Since 2012, results for the Top 10 Most Popular Male and Female Artistes were by telepoll and online voting, each having a weightage of 50% towards the final results. The telepoll lines were announced on 14 March 2014 during a pre-show party. Voting opened from 14 March and closed on 27 April at 8:30pm.

The nominees are listed in telepoll line order. The results of the Top 10 awards are not in rank order.

Note	Description
Italic	New to list (Not nominated last year).
**Bold**	Awardees who made it to the Show 2 top 10.
	Made it to top 10 in the week / Fall under the Top n category.
n	How many of this awards the awardee got.
**10**	To be awarded the All-Time Favourite Artiste in the next Star Awards.

Stage:	Start date	**15 Mar**	**25 Mar**	**1 Apr**	**8 Apr**	**15 Apr**	**Show 2**	
Stage:	End date / Position	**24 Mar**	**31 Mar**	**7 Apr**	**14 Apr**	**21 Apr**	Top 18	Top 10
Telepoll lines	Artistes	Results						
Top 10 Most Popular Male Artistes
**1900-112-2001**	Edwin Goh							
**1900-112-2002**	**Lee Teng**							2
**1900-112-2003**	**Qi Yuwu**							9
**1900-112-2004**	**Desmond Tan**							1
**1900-112-2005**	**Dennis Chew**							5
**1900-112-2006**	**Zhang Zhen Huan**							1
**1900-112-2007**	Zhu Houren							
**1900-112-2008**	Guo Liang							
**1900-112-2009**	Justin Ang							
**1900-112-2010**	**Romeo Tan**							1
**1900-112-2011**	Ian Fang							
**1900-112-2012**	Richard Low							
**1900-112-2013**	Pierre Png							
**1900-112-2014**	**Elvin Ng**							8
**1900-112-2015**	Chen Shucheng							
**1900-112-2016**	Gurmit Singh							
**1900-112-2017**	**Pornsak**							4
**1900-112-2018**	**Zheng Geping**							6
**1900-112-2019**	Dai Xiangyu							
**1900-112-2020**	**Xu Bin**							1
Top 10 Most Popular Female Artistes
**1900-112-2021**	Zhou Ying							
**1900-112-2022**	Paige Chua							
**1900-112-2023**	Christina Lim							
**1900-112-2024**	**Vivian Lai**							**10**
**1900-112-2025**	**Jeanette Aw**							**10**
**1900-112-2026**	Hong Huifang							
**1900-112-2027**	Jin Yinji							
**1900-112-2028**	Tracy Lee							
**1900-112-2029**	**Chris Tong**							1
**1900-112-2030**	**Yvonne Lim**							7
**1900-112-2031**	**Rui En**							9
**1900-112-2032**	Kym Ng							
**1900-112-2033**	Julie Tan							
**1900-112-2034**	Kate Pang							
**1900-112-2035**	**Joanne Peh**							8
**1900-112-2036**	**Ya Hui**							1
**1900-112-2037**	**Rebecca Lim**							3
**1900-112-2038**	Pan Lingling							
**1900-112-2039**	**Quan Yi Fong**							8
**1900-112-2040**	**Belinda Lee**							2

== Post show party awards ==
最 i 明星风范奖 i Weelky Most Stylish (Male): Elvin Ng 黄俊雄	最 i 明星风范奖 i Weelky Most Stylish (Female): Joanne Peh 白薇秀
完美体态奖 Perfect Body Award: Cynthia Koh 许美珍	Yes933 星光魅丽奖 Y.E.S. 93.3FM Award: Chen Han Wei 陈汉玮

== Statistics ==
Drama series nominations:

Nominations	Drama series
21	The Dream Makers 志在四方
12	The Journey: A Voyage 信。约： 唐山到南洋
7	Sudden 骤变
5	Beyond X元素
5	C.L.I.F. 2 警徽天职2
5	Gonna Make It 小小传奇
4	I'm in Charge 小子当家
4	96°C Café 96 °C 咖啡
2	Love at Risk 爱情风险
1	Break Free 曙光
1	Marry Me 我要嫁出去
1	The Recruit Diaries 阿兵新传
1	Start Up 创

Variety / info-ed series nominations:

Nominations	Variety / info-ed series
6	Finding U 寻U先锋
5	The Joy Truck 快乐速递
3	Big Factories 2: Made by Singapore! 巨工厂2 - 新加坡制造
3	Say It! 好好说 慢慢讲！
3	Star Awards 2013 红星大奖2013
3	SPD Charity Show 2013 真情无障爱
3	Stir It Up 电视拌饭
2	Campus SuperStar 2013 校园SuperStar 2013
2	Counter Fake 识货衙门
2	Good Man Good Food 好男人 好料理
2	Singapore Children’s Society Charity Show 童心童意献爱心
2	Smart @ Work 上班不留白
2	Tuesday Report 星期二特写
1	Borders 边城故事
1	Celebrate TV50 欢庆电视50
1	Hey Gorgeous 校园美魔王
1	Laughing Out Loud 笑笑没烦恼
1	Let’s Cook 全民新煮意
1	Lunar New Year’s Eve Special 2013 灵蛇贺新春
1	My Star Guide 8 我的导游是明星8 - 食在好玩！
1	My Working Holiday 打工看世界
1	Project Dream Home 梦想家计划
1	Street Smart 2 自由脚步2
1	Style Check In Series 2 潮人攻略
1	Volkswagen Holiday on Wheels Volkswagen 陪你兜兜风
1	Where the Queue Starts 4 排排站 查查看4
1	Mediacorp Channel 8 新传媒8频道

Current affairs series nominations:

Nominations	Current affairs series
2	Focus 焦点
2	Frontline 前线追踪
1	Money Week 财经追击
1	Remembering Huang Wen Yong 星光不朽。黄文永

Drama series awards:

Awards	Drama series
9	The Dream Makers 志在四方
2	I'm in Charge 小子当家
2	The Journey: A Voyage 信。约： 唐山到南洋
1	C.L.I.F. 2 警徽天职2
1	The Recruit Diaries 阿兵新传
1	Sudden 骤变

Variety / info-ed / current affairs series awards:

Awards	Variety / info-ed / current affairs series
3	The Joy Truck 快乐速递
3	Star Awards 2013 红星大奖2013
2	Finding U 寻U先锋
1	Borders 边城故事
1	Focus 焦点
1	Frontline 前线追踪
1	Let’s Cook 全民新煮意
1	Say It! 好好说 慢慢讲！
1	Street Smart 2 自由脚步2
1	Where the Queue Starts 4 排排站 查查看4
1	Mediacorp Channel 8 新传媒8频道

== Presenters and performers ==
The following individuals presented awards or performed musical numbers.

=== Show 1 ===
Artistes / Special guests	Presented / Performed
John Kuek 郑炳泰	Announcer for Star Awards 20 (show 1)
Zoe Tay 郑惠玉; Chen Hanwei 陈汉玮; Dennis Chew 周崇庆; Kym Ng 鐘琴 (cameo); Guo Liang 郭亮; Rebecca Lim 林慧玲; Mark Lee 李国煌	Spin-off skits from The Dream Makers
Zheng Geping 郑各评; Joanne Peh 白薇秀	Presenter for the awards for Best Set Design (Entertainment Programmes) and Best Cameraman (Entertainment Programmes)
Best Variety Show Host nominees	Presenter for the awards for Best Variety Producer and Best Variety Research Writer
Koh Jia Ler 许家乐; Lyn Oh Ling En 胡菱恩	Presenter for the award for Young Talent Award
Desmond Tan 陈泂江; Julie Tan 陈欣淇; Romeo Tan 陈罗密欧; Sora Ma 马艺瑄; Rebecca Lim 林慧玲	Best Theme Song nominations: Performed 《家乡》 (from The Journey: A Voyage); Performed 《啡情歌》 (from 96°C Café); Performed 《骤变》 (from Sudden); Performed 《呼吸》 (from Beyond); Performed 《幸福不难》 (from The Dream Makers)
Wang Yuqing 王昱青; Xiang Yun 向云	Presenter for the award for Best Theme Song
Serene Koong 龔芝怡	Performed 《幸福不难》 (from The Dream Makers)
Mark Lee 李国煌; Pierre Png 方展发	Presenter for the awards for Best Programme Promo and Best Editing (Entertainment Programmes)
Tay Ping Hui; Zhu Houren 朱厚任	Presenter for the awards for Best Director and Best Screenplay
Zhang Wei 张爲	Announcer of Social Media Award
Chen Hanwei; Kym Ng; Quan Yi Fong	Hosts of "Truth In The City"
Dennis Chew Shaun Chen	Special guests of "Truth In The City"
Favourite Male Character nominees	Participants of "Truth In The City"
Zoe Tay	Announcer of Favourite Male Character
Mediacorp CEO; Shaun Seow 萧文光	Gave out award for Most Popular Regional Artiste Awards
Mediacorp Chairman; Teo Ming Kian 张铭坚	Gave out awards for Top Rated Drama Serial and Top Rated Variety Series
Desmond Sim 沈金兴; Lin Mei Jiao 林梅娇	Presenter for the award for Favourite Female Character
Terence Cao Priscelia Chan	Presenter for the award for Favourite Onscreen Couple
Senior Minister of State, Finance and Transport; Josephine Teo 杨莉明	Gave out the award for Rocket Award

=== Show 2 ===
Artistes / Special guests	Presented / Performed
John Kuek 郑炳泰	Announcer for Star Awards 20 (show 2)
Zoe Tay	Lead presenting past award winners (Best Supporting Actress, Best Supporting Actor, Best Variety Show Host and Best Info-Ed Programme Host, Best Actor, Best Actress)
Leroy Yang 杨一展 Janet Hsieh	Presenter for the awards for Best Info-ed Programme Host and Best Info-ed Programme awards
Georgina Fang 方念华	Presenter for the awards for Best News Story and Best Current Affairs Story awards
Christopher Lee Fann Wong	Presenter for the award for Best Supporting Actor award
Yeo Yann Yann	Presenter for the award for Best Supporting Actress award
Tsui Li Hsin 崔丽心 Bowie Tsang	Presenter for the awards for Best Variety Show Host and Best Variety Programme awards
Anthony Chen	Presenter for the award for Best Drama Serial
Huang Jia Qian 黄嘉千; Wu Tian Sheng 吴天胜	Special memory game item, presenters for the award for Best Variety Special award Front-row artistes (left to right): Chew Chor Meng - Pierre Png; Huang Biren - Huang Biren; Tay Ping Hui - Chen Liping; Chris Tong - Zhu Houren; Lee Teng - Quan Yi Fong; Kym Ng - Rui En; Thomas Ong - Jin Yinji; Chen Liping - Lee Teng; Rui En - Chew Chor Meng; Jeanette Aw - Dennis Chew; Zoe Tay - Kym Ng; Xiang Yun - Jeanette Aw; Chen Shucheng - Tay Ping Hui; Shaun Chen - Vivian Lai; Mark Lee - Zheng Geping; Cavin Soh - Zoe Tay; Terence Cao - Chen Shucheng; Pierre Png - Xiang Yun; Qi Yuwu^{4} - Guo Liang; Li Yinzhu - Mark Lee^{4} Held the winners' list
Acting Minister of Manpower Tan Chuan-Jin	Gave out the award for All-Time Favourite Artiste
Kara Hui	Presenter for the award for Best Actress award
George Lam Alex Lam 林德信	Presenter for the award for Best Actor award
George Hu Annie Chen	Presenter for the award for Top 10 Most Popular Male Artistes award
PwC Singapore associate 林福春	Gave presenters Top 10 Most Popular Artistes winners' list
Zoe Tay Wu Chun	Presenter for the award for Top 10 Most Popular Female Artistes award

== Trivia ==
=== Awards categories ===
- This year introduced four award categories: Social Media Award, Most Popular Regional Artiste Award, Asian Skin Solutions Most Radiant Skin Award and London Choco Roll Happiness Award.
- The Favourite Host award was retired as it was purely based on the popularity of the host, which would already have been taken into account in the Top 10 awards.
- This is the first Star Awards ceremony with several changes:
  - The show sponsors were credited on narration during the credits, as it was previously done on other award ceremonies such as the Academy Awards.
  - The Best Theme Song award now include online voting, making it the first time a professional-judged award category incorporate public votes as the determinant of the award. Both components carries a 50% weightage.
  - Award categories can only be presented if the quota of a minimal 10 candidates, is fulfilled. Best News Presenter, Best Current Affairs Presenter and Best Newcomer awards were suspended due to lack of eligible nominees as a result of the change. However, despite Channel 8 News & Current Affairs already had ten news presenters by the end of 2014, only the Best Newcomer returned in the following year (except 2016 and 2017), while the Best News Presenter and Best Current Affairs Presenter had not presented since 2013. The Best News Story and Best Current Affairs Story awards took their place, being given out on Show 2 instead of Show 1.

=== Ceremony information ===
- Justin Ang is the first Mediacorp artiste to be nominated for the Top 10 Most Popular Male Artistes Award without appearing in a Mandarin production.
- For the first time, there are three recipients each for the Best Variety Producer and Best Director awards. Gan Bee Khim, Mandy Tan and Lim Shiong Chiang won the Best Variety Producer award, while Wong Foong Hwee, Leong Lye Lin and Chong Liung Man won the Best Director award.
- Priscelia Chan is the first female winner for the Rocket Award. The past winners for the award were all males.
- Romeo Tan, Zhang Zhen Huan, Desmond Tan, Xu Bin, Chris Tong and Ya Hui received their first Top 10 Most Popular Artistes award this year.
- This was the most recent show the ceremony was held outside the Mediacorp studios, until the 2021 ceremony, which was held at the Jewel Changi Airport and on Terminal 4.

== Accolades ==
Organisation	Year	Nominee	Accolade	Representative work	Result	Ref
Star Awards	2015	Lin Shih Han 林诗涵	Best Variety Research Writer 最佳综艺资料撰稿	Star Awards 20 (Prelude)	Nominated	
Star Awards	2015	Gan Bee Khim 颜美琴	Best Variety Producer 最佳综艺编导	Star Awards 20 (Show 2)	Nominated	
Star Awards	2015	—N/a	Best Variety Special 最佳综艺特备节目	Star Awards 20 (Show 1)	Nominated	
Star Awards	2015	—N/a	Best Variety Special 最佳综艺特备节目	Star Awards 20 (Show 2)	Won	

== See also ==
- List of variety and infotainment programmes broadcast by Mediacorp Channel 8
- Mediacorp Channel 8
- Mediacorp Channel U
