= Sudden (TV series) =

- 骤变
- Genre: Drama; Law; Action; Romance
- Created by: Phang Kai Yee 彭凯毅
- Directed by: Leong Lye Lin 梁来玲; Loh Woon Woon 罗温温; Wong Foong Hwee 黄芬菲
- Starring: Romeo Tan; Rui En; Rebecca Lim; Zhang Zhenhuan
- Opening theme: 骤变 By DFC 大风吹 Feat. Romeo Tan
- Ending theme: You and Me by Olivia Ong
- Country of origin: Singapore
- Original language: Chinese
- No. of episodes: 20

Production
- Executive producer: Leong Lye Lin 梁来玲
- Production locations: Singapore; Tasmania, Australia
- Running time: approx. 45 minutes (exc. advertisements)

Original release
- Network: MediaCorp Channel 8
- Release: 2 September – 27 September 2013

Sudden (Chinese: 骤变) is a Mediacorp Channel 8 law drama. It starred Romeo Tan, Rui En, Rebecca Lim & Zhang Zhenhuan as casts of the series.

It was broadcast on MediaCorp Channel 8 from 2 September 2013 to 27 September 2013.

== Cast ==
- Rui En as Cheng Chuning 程楚宁, a lawyer
- Romeo Tan as Fang Qiliang 方启亮, a lawyer
- Rebecca Lim as twin sisters Guo Wei Qian 郭玮茜 and Huang Yi Xin 黄逸心 who were separated when they were young but reunited much later.
- Zhang Zhenhuan as Sun Dalun 孙达伦, a lawyer

=== Other casts ===
Cast	Role	Description
Ian Fang	Zhong Wentai 钟文泰	Lawyer
Sora Ma	Guan Jiemin 关洁敏	Lawyer
Yuan Shuai	Lin Shenghua	
Flapper	Flapper	
Constance Song	Situ Xinmei 司徒心美	Prosecutor, then Lawyer
Guo Liang	Cheng Gaofeng	Lawyer
Amy Cheng	Chen Yirou 陈以柔	Cheng Chuning's mother Cheng Gaofeng's wife Suffers from CADASIL and left her family because of it Lives in a nursing home
Li Wenhai	Guo Zhongxin 郭中信	Guo Weiqian and Chen Yixin's father Yixin's alibi, proving she left RHF; Died in a car accident in episode 2
Zheng Geping	Zhong Zhenlie 钟振烈	Chairman of RHF Charity Foundation; Committed suicide out of guilt a few months ago Previously known as Tiger Shark in Malaysia
Ye Shipin	Feng Yuanzhi 冯远志	Took control of RHF when Zhenlie died
Tracer Wong 王裕香	Belinda Hong Yanmei 洪艳美	Kept the murder weapon in case Yuanzhi betrayed them Has a daughter called Pricilla
Zhang Xinxiang	Su Mingsheng 苏名声	Kept Zhenlie's suicide note in case Yuanzhi betrayed them Died in episode 16
Darren Lim	Joda	Founder of Xin Yue Zhang; Pianist, missionary musician Believes you can speak to God through music and help them go to Heaven; Has a high profile, created a superstar image for himself and lives an affluent lifestyle
Brandon Wong	He Jianming 何建明	Co-founded Xin Yue Zhang with Joda 8 years ago Claims that Joda is a devil, that he's a fraud and pocketed the donations Donated 260K to Xin Yue Zhang 3 years ago
Hu Wensui	Liu Zhi'an 刘志安	Ex-member of Xin Yue Zhang
Laura Kee 纪丽晶	Ye Yongmei 叶咏梅	Ex-member of Xin Yue Zhang
William Lawandi 刘峻宏	Liu Guangming 刘广明	Ex-member of Xin Yue Zhang
Yao Wenlong	Kang Wenxing 康文星	Liao Qiqi's manager Treats Liao Qiqi like his own daughter Too principled, over-protective of Liao Qiqi, upright, quick-tempered and easily provoked Caused Liao Qiqi to lose many acting jobs because he was protecting her Thinks Bobby enticed Liao Qiqi to terminate her contract and instigated her into it Worries that Liao Qiqi may sell herself to get work when she joins Starsouth
Jayley Woo	Liao Qiqi 廖棋棋	Born in the Year of the Rat so she loves rats and buys a lot of rat products Came to Singapore at 13 and graduated from performing arts in a drama college a year ago Talent scouted by Kang Wenxing and became his artiste Wanted to terminate her contract with Wenxing to move to Bobby's company Thinks that Kang Wenxing likes her but is mistaken
Wallace Ang 洪圣安	Bobby Wu	Founder of Starsouth; Wants Liao Qiqi to sign on to his company Became incredibly wealthy in just three years with only two artistes under him Forces his artistes to sell their bodies to gain acting deals Filmed Kexuan's first time selling her body and used it to blackmail her
Paige Chua	Zhao Kexuan 赵可萱	Artiste of Starsouth; Sold her body to gain acting deals Her first time was filmed and used by Bobby to blackmail her from leaving
Seth Ang 翁兴昂	Lin Baofa 林宝发	Huang Meiling's husband Owner of the lorry that caused Qiliang's accident Suspected of drink-driving and causing the accident Drinks and gambles
Angels Yeung 杨迪嘉	Huang Meiling 黄美玲	Lin Baofa's wife
许竣翔	Zhu Youcai 朱有才	Meiling's boyfriend
Candyce Toh 杜蕙昂	Melody	Hongxing's wife Given the wrong sperm specimen for IVF; Gave birth to a half-Chinese half-Indian boy Doesn't want to give up the baby which resulted in their divorce Reunited with Hongxing in the end
Zen Chong	Zhang Hongxing 张宏兴	Melody's husband Didn't accept Melody's son as his own which lead to a divorce Accepted Melody's son and reunited with her in the end
Chen Tianwen	Chen Huiwu 陈辉武	Chen Zuyun's son
Zhang Wei 張為	Chen Zuyun 陈祖运	Chen Huiwu's father Diagnosed with mild Alzheimer's disease Signed transfer papers in a daze due to cough medicine Treats Ruan Yan like his own daughter Said to be a lecherous old man
Joey Feng 冯瑾瑜	Ruan Yan 阮燕	Chen Zuyun's maid Accused by Huiwu of seducing Zuyun
Lieu Yanxi 刘彦希	Priscilla	Belinda's daughter

== Production ==
The series was also shot at Tasmania, Australia. Scenes were taken at Mount Nelson, Hobart and Curringa Farm.

Dai Xiangyu was initially cast as the male lead. Due to his non renewal of contract, Romeo Tan was roped in. Pan Lingling was originally going to play the role of Situ Xinmei, but she had to turn down her role to undergo surgery to remove her breast cysts. The role was given to Constance Song.

At the beginning of each episode before the opening video, footage of Romeo Tan and Rui En in Tasmania is shown and this will be linked to the later part of the drama. Behind-the-scenes photos of the travel are also shown during the ending credits of each episode.

== Accolades ==
Year	Award	Category	Nominee / Work	Result	Ref
2014	Star Awards	Best Theme Song	"骤变"	Nominated	
2014	Star Awards	Best Director	Leong Lye Lin 梁来玲	Won	
2014	Star Awards	Favourite Male Character	Romeo Tan	Nominated	
2014	Star Awards	Favourite Female Character	Rebecca Lim	Nominated	
2014	Star Awards	Favourite Onscreen Couple (Drama)	Romeo Tan and Rui En	Nominated	
2014	Star Awards	Best Actress	Rebecca Lim	Nominated	
2014	Asian Television Awards	Best Actress in a Leading Role	Rui En	Nominated	

== See also ==
- List of programmes broadcast by Mediacorp Channel 8
