= Star Awards for Toggle awards =

Singaporean media award

Star Awards for Toggle awards Toggle奖项
- Current: Star Awards 2016
- Awarded for: Most popular artiste(s) based on each theme
- Country: Singapore
- Presented by: Mediacorp; Toggle
- First award: 2015
- Currently held by: Dennis Chew 周崇庆 & Rui En 瑞恩 (Most Beloved Celebrity BFF Award, 2016)

The Star Awards for Toggle awards are a series of awards presented annually at the Star Awards, a ceremony that was established in 1994. It is presented by Toggle, a Mediacorp interactive service since 2012.

These Toggle awards can be based on any theme each year. For example, the first Toggle award for 2015 was the Toggle Outstanding Duke Award, which is given in honour of a Mediacorp male artiste who is one of the eight dukes that is deemed as the most popular among the television audience. The Toggle award for 2016 is Toggle Most Beloved Celebrity BFF Award. It is given in honour of a Mediacorp celebrity BFF (Best Friends Forever) pairing that is deemed as the most popular among the television audience.

The nominees are determined by a team of judges employed by Mediacorp; winners are selected by a majority vote from the public via online voting.

== Recipients ==
Year	Theme	Winner(s)	Nominees
2015	Outstanding Duke Award 杰出公子奖	Xu Bin	Ian Fang; Aloysius Pang; Shane Pow; Desmond Tan; Romeo Tan; Jeffrey Xu; Zhang Zhenhuan
2016	Most Beloved Celebrity BFF Award 人气BFF	Dennis Chew and Rui En	Chen Hanwei and Zoe Tay; Ian Fang and Jeffrey Xu; Kate Pang and Vivian Lai; Aloysius Pang and Xu Bin

^{^[I]} Each year is linked to the article about the Star Awards held that year.
