= Xin Yue =

Xin Yue or Xinyue may refer to:

- Xinxiang–Yueshan railway or Xin-Yue Railway, a railroad in Henan, China, between Xinxiang and Bo'ai County
- Crescent Moon Society or Xinyue Society, a Chinese literary society from 1923 to 1931
- The Journey (trilogy series), a 2013–15 Singaporean TV series
  - The Journey: A Voyage (2013)
  - The Journey: Tumultuous Times (2014)
  - The Journey: Our Homeland (2015)

== See also ==
- Yue Xin (disambiguation) for a list of people with the surname Yue
