= Super Senior =

2015 Singaporean TV series

- 长辈甜心
- Genre: Drama; Family; Pioneer Generation
- Written by: Lim Gim Lam 林锦兰; Goh Chwee Chwee 吴翠翠
- Starring: Zhu Houren; Xiang Yun; Wang Yuqing; Hong Huifang; Richard Low; Chen Shucheng; Jin Yinji
- Opening theme: Live Yourself (活出自己) by Chriz Tong, Boon Hui Lu, Shirlene Tia and Jerry Fong
- Ending theme: Test (考验) by Chriz Tong
- Country of origin: Singapore
- Original languages: Mandarin, with some English dialogue
- No. of episodes: 20

Production
- Producer: Soh Bee Lian 苏美莲
- Running time: approx. 45 minutes

Original release
- Network: Mediacorp Channel 8
- Release: 18 June – 15 July 2015

Related
- Mind Game; The Journey: Our Homeland; World at Your Feet; I'm in Charge; The Gentlemen; My Teacher Is a Thug

Super Senior (Chinese: 长辈甜心) is a Singaporean family drama produced and telecast on MediaCorp Channel 8. The show aired at 9 pm on weekdays and had a repeat telecast at 8 am the following day. The drama began production in February 2015 and made its run from 18 June to 15 July 2015. It is partly sponsored by the Media Development Authority of Singapore.

== Cast ==
=== Main cast ===
Cast	Role	Description
Zhu Houren 朱厚任	Zhu Xiangdong 朱向东	Richard Choo, Mr Choo; Bakery shop owner Yu Fang's ex-husband Wang Dali's cousin Dongdong's father
Xiang Yun 向云	Yu Fang 于芳	Mrs Choo, Mrs Ong, Madam Yu; Zhu Xiangdong's ex-wife Wang Dali's love interest Wang Dali's girlfriend in episode 20
Wang Yuqing 王昱清	Wang Dali 王达利	Mr Ong; Baker; Zhu Xiangdong's cousin Zhu Decong's uncle Yu Fang's love interest Yu Fang's boyfriend in episode 20
Hong Huifang 洪慧芳	Hong Caiyun 洪彩云	Coffee shop fried kway teow tenant Dong Guanghui's wife Dong Haoyuan's mother Chen Anxin's mother-in-law Previously at loggerheads with Chen Yalai
Richard Low 刘谦益	Liu Fugui 刘福贵	
Chen Shucheng 陈澍城	Chen Yalai 陈亚来	Security guard Chen Guotai and Chen Anxin's father Ivy Ji and Dong Haoyuan's father-in-law Previously at loggerheads with Hong Caiyun
Jin Yinji 金银姬	Jin Huixi 金惠熙	Korean dance instructor Guan Qiming's mother Died due to cancer (Deceased – episode 19)

=== Supporting cast ===
Cast	Role	Description
Henry Thia 程旭辉	Dong Guanghui 董光辉	Coffee shop fried kway teow tenant Hong Caiyun's husband Died in his sleep (Deceased – episode 11)
Rayson Tan 陈泰铭	Chen Guotai 陈国泰	Property and insurance agent Chen Yalai's son Ivy Ji's ex-husband Dingding's father
Vivian Lai 赖怡伶	Ivy Ji Shanzhong 纪姗钟	Parasite (寄生虫) Sponger ( person who gets money, food, etc. from other people, especially in order to live without working); Chen Yalai's daughter-in-law Chen Guotai's ex-wife Dingding's mother
Aloysius Pang 冯伟衷	Dong Haoyuan 董浩元	Dr Tong; Dong Guanghui and Hong Caiyun's son Chen Anxin's husband Chen Yalai's son-in-law In love with Chen Anxin and married her in the end
Jayley Woo 胡佳琪	Chen Anxin 陈安心	Ex-nurse, now coffee shop fried kway teow tenant Chen Yalai's daughter Dong Haoyuan's wife Zhu Decong's love interest Hong Caiyun's daughter-in-law In love with Dong Haoyuan and married him in the end
Yao Wenlong 姚彣隆	Guan Qiming 关启明	Ex-convict; Jin Huixi's son Bakery shop apprentice under the supervision of Wang Dali in episode 20
Jeremy Chan 田铭耀	Zhu Decong 朱德聪	Cameo actor Wang Dali's nephew Best Newcomer winner in Golden Man Awards
Shelia Tan	Pink	Zhu Xiangdong's employee Dongdong's mother Chased away by Xiangdong in episode 20 after having an affair with a new worker

== Episodes ==
No.	Title	Original release date
1	"Episode 1"	June 18, 2015
2	"Episode 2"	June 19, 2015
3	"Episode 3"	June 22, 2015
4	"Episode 4"	June 23, 2015
5	"Episode 5"	June 24, 2015
6	"Episode 6"	June 25, 2015
7	"Episode 7"	June 26, 2015
8	"Episode 8"	June 29, 2015
9	"Episode 9"	June 30, 2015
10	"Episode 10"	July 1, 2015
11	"Episode 11"	July 2, 2015
12	"Episode 12"	July 3, 2015
13	"Episode 13"	July 6, 2015
14	"Episode 14"	July 7, 2015
15	"Episode 15"	July 8, 2015
16	"Episode 16"	July 9, 2015
17	"Episode 17"	July 10, 2015
18	"Episode 18"	July 13, 2015
19	"Episode 19"	July 14, 2015
20	"Episode 20"	July 15, 2015

== Information ==
- Yao Wenlong, Aloysius Pang and Jayley Woo also had scenes together in Tiger Mum.
- The series was repeated at 8 am.
- The main characters' surnames are similar to that of the actors that play them, with the exception of Xiang Yun's.
- This Series repeated at 5.30pm on weekdays succeeding Mind Game
- This series repeated at 7am on weekends succeeding Hand In Hand

== Controversy ==
Malaysia's satellite channel Astro Shuang Xing was to air the show first in Asia, beginning from 11 June 2015, Sundays to Thursdays, as with Mind Game (aired on 30 April). When The Journey: Our Homeland aired on 9 July, Our Homeland had to be pulled out temporarily for a week on 16 July due to the discretion of MediaCorp. This caused Taiwan SET's Be With You 2 episodes back-to-back telecast to be pushed forward to 5.00 pm from 16 to 23 July. Our Homeland resumed airing the show on the same day as Singapore from 23 July 2015, Mondays to Fridays. In fact, Astro shouldn't have aired MediaCorp dramas first before Singapore does so beginning with Mind Game, as it did not perform well in Singapore and is also nominated for only one technical award in Star Awards 2016, and that only Super Senior and The Dream Makers II were the only dramas in the planned First Global Premiere to win performance categories.

== Awards and nominations ==
Super Senior is nominated for 4 nominations in 3 award categories, including one technical award and one voting-based award. Chen Shucheng won the Best Evergreen Artiste Award category.

=== Star Awards 2016 ===
Awards
Award	Category	Recipients (if any)	Result
Star Awards 2016 Backstage Achievement Awards 红星大奖2016之幕后英雄颁奖礼	Best Screenplay 最佳剧本	Lim Gim Lan 林锦兰; Goh Chwee Chwee 吴翠翠	Nominated
Star Awards 2016 Show 1 红星大奖2016 上半场	Best Evergreen Artiste Award 常青演绎奖	Chen Shucheng 陈澍城	Won
Star Awards 2016 Show 1 红星大奖2016 上半场	Best Evergreen Artiste Award 常青演绎奖	Xiang Yun 向云	Nominated
Star Awards 2016 Post-show Party 红星大奖2016 庆功宴	Favourite Female Character 最喜爱女角色	Xiang Yun 向云	Nominated

== See also ==
- List of programmes broadcast by Mediacorp Channel 8
