= Life Is Beautiful (Singaporean TV series) =

- 初一的心愿
- Genre: Modern; Medical
- Written by: Ng Kah Huay 黄佳华
- Starring: Rui En; Pierre Png; Ya Hui; Jeffrey Xu; Aileen Tan; Chen Shucheng; Lin Meijiao
- Theme music composer: Melody - Lin Si Tong 林思彤; Lyricist - Lin Si Tong 林思彤, Tan Puey Yee 陈佩仪
- Opening theme: Perfect treatment (完美治疗者) by Lin Si Tong
- Ending theme: Don't Misunderstand Me (我们不都是这样) by Lin Si Tong; Life Is Beautiful (初一的心愿) by Lin Si Tong
- Country of origin: Singapore
- Original languages: Mandarin, with some English dialogue
- No. of episodes: 20

Production
- Executive producer: Wong Kuang Yong 黄光荣
- Producer: Wong Kuang Yong 黄光荣
- Running time: approx. 45 minutes

Original release
- Network: Mediacorp Channel 8
- Release: 5 March – 8 April 2015

Related
- Good Luck; Tiger Mum

Life Is Beautiful (Chinese: 初一的心愿) is a Singaporean Chinese drama produced by MediaCorp Channel 8. The drama is a collaboration between MediaCorp, National Kidney Foundation Singapore and the Singapore Kindness Movement, which hopes to raise awareness of kidney-related diseases.

== Synopsis ==
Shen Chuyi (Rui En) is a happy-go-lucky girl who, since she was a child, has seen how much her father has suffered from kidney dialysis. Thus, she has cultivated the good habit of eating healthily, and often reminds people around her to maintain a healthy diet. Chuyi works in the events company of Yu Yang (Pierre Png), the fiancé of her bosom friend, Cai Jiayi. The three of them volunteer regularly in the charity activities of NKF.

Sadly, when Chuyi grown older, she realised that she has some conditions that is similar to that of her father's. Chuyi was worried if she have kidney disease, like her father. After the checkup, Chuyi is diagnosed with acute kidney disease. Chuyi’s boyfriend, Ding Zhanpeng (Allen Chen), leaves her as his parents disapprove them from being together. Chuyi's mother, Chen Miaoyu (Aileen Tan) is devastated and tries to donate her kidney to save Chuyi but is unable to do so because of her own health problems. Jiayi cannot bear to see Chuyi tormented by kidney disease, she decides to donate a kidney to her. Chuyi is adamant about refusing it, not to mention that Jiayi’s parents oppose the decision vehemently. Before Jiayi manages to convince her parents, she is killed in a car accident at an early age. In accordance with the organ pledge form that she had signed before her death, Jiayi’s kidney is donated to Chuyi….

After being given a new lease of life, Chuyi and Junkai (Dasmond Koh), a fellow kidney patient, set up a mutual support group with several other patients. A strong and cohesive group, they meet regularly for activities and exercises every week.

Ever since Jiayi died, the Cai family has been living in grief. Out of gratitude and her wish to take care of Jiayi’s parents, Chuyi begins to associate with the family. She becomes “acquainted with” 85-kg Cai Jiajia (Ya Hui) who indulges in binge eating, and Jiayi’s parents, Cai Qingde (Chen Shucheng) and Huang Cuijiao (Lin Meijiao). Having had a taste of the lifestyle and eating habits of the family, Chuyi tries to change their extremely unhealthy ways. Ever since Qingde and Cuijiao lost their beloved daughter, they have been wallowing in misery. When Chuyi enters their lives, they discover that she shares similar characteristics with Jiayi. For some strange reasons, they develop a fondness for her, and started to regard Chuyi as their daughter. Jiajia feels indignant that Chuyi means more to her parents than she does….

As for Yu Yang, Jiayi’s death drives him to shut himself away. He furiously buries himself in work. Yu Yang has a bosom friend, Lin Zhongken (Jeffrey Xu). He counsels Yu Yang to accept the truth that Jiayi is gone, and points out that it is unrealistic for him to let his feelings die off.

Zhongken is an instructor at a fitness academy who has a psychological issue with “complete honesty”; he suffocates for no reason the moment he tells a lie. Through Yu Yang, Zhongken gets to know Jiajia. His inability to tell lies leads to several unpleasant encounters with her, but deep down, he develops feelings for Jiajia.

Zhongken spares no effort in helping Jiajia to lose weight, and reveals his love for her. Jiajia naturally refuses to believe him, let alone accept his love. She finds that the two of them are incompatible. Accepting Zhongken will only put undue pressure on herself. Zhongken feels helpless.

Chuyi is well aware of the pain that Jiayi’s death has inflicted on Yu Yang. In helping Yu Yang to emerge from his emotional abyss, the two of them unknowingly develop feelings for each other. Unexpectedly, Chuyi meets Zhanpeng, her former boyfriend. It turns out that after jilting Chuyi, he married Simone, his new girlfriend and had a son with her. Unfortunately, the baby was born with a heart condition. Simone deserted both of them, leaving Zhanpeng to take care of their ailing child singlehandedly. Upon learning the situation, Chuyi selflessly extends a helping hand and shows concern for father and son. Zhanpeng regrets his stupid decision to leave Chuyi. His love for her is rekindled.

At the same time, Chuyi discovers that a client of hers, Lin Shaoping (Hong Huifang) is actually Yu Yang’s mother who abandoned him when he was a child. Yu Yang was six when his mother left him to elope with her boyfriend. The sight of his devastated and humiliated father made Yu Yang hate her to the core. After marrying her boyfriend, Shaoping built up a furniture empire. The remorse she feels towards her son increases by the day. By chance, she finds out about his events company. She conceals her identity and becomes a client of the company. Chuyi finds out the secret but promises Shaoping that she will keep the truth from Yu Yang. She often creates opportunities for mother and son to spend time together. Shaoping, stricken with heart disease, dies with regret. As Yu Yang feels guilty about behaving callously towards his mother, he is reluctant to inherit the fortune she has left for him. In the end, he uses part of it to set up a charity foundation in his mother’s name…

Jiajia’s weight problem becomes serious and she has a bad fall one day. With her legs rendered immobile, it makes her even more discouraged. Yu Yang hopes that Jiajia will take good care of her health for the sake of her parents. Jiajia finally overcomes her resentment towards Chuyi and accepts help from both of them by embarking on a health regimen of diet and exercise…. Love grows between Yu Yang and Chuyi as they spend more and more time together. Slowly but surely, Chuyi enters Yu Yang’s life. Be it in his daily activities or areas of work, Chuyi plays an indispensable role. Yu Yang cannot help but fear that he is falling for her so naturally. He is afraid of betraying the late Jiayi and forgetting her by loving Chuyi. He forces himself to curb his feelings. Will Yu Yang be able to open his heart to embrace Chuyi’s love?

On the other hand, Zhanpeng, who is increasingly reliant on Chuyi, is doing his best to touch her heart. He pleads with her to renew their relationship, and to take care of his sickly son together. Chuyi is hesitant. Should she accept Zhanpeng?

== Cast ==
- Rui En as Shen Chuyi 沈初一
- Pierre Png as Yu Yang 于洋
- Ya Hui as Cai Jiajia 蔡嘉嘉
- Jeffrey Xu as Lin Zhongken 林忠恳, a fitness Instructor
- Allen Chen as Ding Zhanpeng 丁展鹏
- Esther Yang as Cai Jiayi 蔡嘉怡

Cast	Character	Description
Aileen Tan 陈丽贞	Chen Miaoyu 陈妙玉	Chuyi's mother
Lin Meijiao 林梅娇	Huang Cuijiao 黄翠娇	Jiajia and Jiayi's mother
Chen Shucheng 陈澍城	Cai Qingde 蔡清德	Jiajia's and Jiayi's father
Hong Huifang 洪慧芳	Lin Shaoping 林少萍	Yu Yang's Mother
Ian Fang 方伟杰	Zai Zai 仔仔	Suffered a stroke In Episode 8
Cavin Soh 苏梽诚	Fei Ge 肥哥	
Cynthia Koh 许美珍	Fang Jie 芳姐	
Dasmond Koh 许振荣	Zhang Junkai 俊凯	Junxiu's Brother
Seraph Sun 孙欣佩	Zhang Junxiu 俊秀	Junkai's Sister
Chen Tianwen 陈天文	Albert Zhang	Miaoyu's Admirer
Sora Ma 马艺瑄	Ann	Shaoping's PA
Tracy Lee 李美玲	Zhou Huimin 周惠敏	Junkai's Admirer

== OST Soundtrack ==
Song title	Song type	Performer	Lyricist(s)	Composer(s)	Song Arranger(s)	Producer(s)
完美治疗者 (Perfect Healer)	Theme Song	Lin Si Tong 林思彤	Lin Si Tong, Tan Puey Yee	Lin Si Tong	Clement Yang, Jim Lim	Jim Lim
初一的心愿 (Life Is Beautiful)	Sub-theme Song	Lin Si Tong 林思彤	Lin Si Tong, Darren Lim		Eric Wong	Lin Si Tong, Eric Wong
我们不都是这样 (We Are All The Same)	Sub-theme Song	Lin Si Tong 林思彤	Lin Si Tong		Clement Yang, Lin Si Tong	Jim Lim

== Production ==
- The theme song performer, Lin Si Tong, served as Pierre Png and Dasmond Koh's music instructor for the series. She had guided their music scenes during the drama shoot, and also produced their versions of her songs for the series in the recording studio.
- NKF quick facts are shared at the end of each episode.

== Release ==
Broadcast of the show was suspended between 23 and 27 March 2015 during the period of national mourning of the first prime minister of Singapore Lee Kuan Yew's death.

== Accolades ==
Life Is Beautiful was nominated for only one technical award in Star Awards 2016. Lim Hap Choon was nominated for Best Cameraman, but lost to Steve Wong Kwok Chung from The Journey: Our Homeland.

Year	Ceremony	Category	Nominees	Result	Ref
2016	Star Awards	Best Cameraman (for Drama Programmes) 最佳戏剧摄影	Lim Hap Choon 林合存	Nominated	
2016	Fame Awards 星光大奖	Best Actress in a Leading Role 最佳女主角	Rui En	Nominated	
2016	Fame Awards 星光大奖	Best Actress in a Leading Role 最佳女主角	Ya Hui	Nominated	

== See also ==
- List of programmes broadcast by Mediacorp Channel 8
- National Kidney Foundation Singapore
