= Sealed with a Kiss (2015 TV series) =

- Also known as: 索吻记
- 吻我吧，住家男
- Genre: Romance; Comedy; Fantasy
- Written by: Ng Kah Huay 黄佳华; Cheong Yan Peng 张彦平
- Directed by: 任海曜 林明哲
- Starring: Rebecca Lim; Elvin Ng; Zhang Zhenhuan; Carrie Wong
- Opening theme: Full of Happiness (满满的幸福) by Chew Sin Huey
- Ending theme: Dear (亲爱的) by Matthew Teng (No commentaries for News Tonight)
- Country of origin: Singapore
- Original language: Chinese
- No. of episodes: 20 (list of episodes)

Production
- Executive producer: Winnie Wong 王尤红
- Running time: approx. 45 minutes (exc. advertisements)

Original release
- Network: MediaCorp Channel 8
- Release: 27 August – 24 September 2015

Related
- The Journey: Our Homeland; Hand In Hand

Sealed with a Kiss (Chinese: 吻我吧，住家男) is a Singaporean romance drama produced and telecast on MediaCorp Channel 8. The drama began production in April 2015 and began its run from 27 August 2015. The show aired at 9pm on weekdays and had a repeat telecast at 8am the following day. The series stars Rebecca Lim, Elvin Ng, Zhang Zhenhuan and Carrie Wong as the main casts of the series.

== Plot ==
Du Junning (Rebecca Lim), is a successful real estate agent. She is well known for knowing how to sweet-talk not only her clients, as well as her superior and colleagues. However, those words are not what will truly comes from her heart. One day, she realized that her life has turned upside down after an accidental kiss with Zhu Jianan - where she could only speak the truth. She started offending people all around her by being blunt and straightforward, which result in the loss of job, relationship, kinship and even friendship. Her father avoided her, her best friend Zhenzhen fell out with her and she drove her boyfriend away.

Zhu Jianan (Elvin Ng), is a man who is a jinx to the people around him. He has a crush on Du Junning and enjoys watching romantic Korean dramas, and often visualized her and himself as the leads, having an extremely romantic story plot. When he had an accidental kiss with Du Junning, he became a lucky star - good things kept coming towards him such as winning the lucky draw and became a famous designer overnight. However, his luck has attracted all his relatives whom disagreed to take Jianan in when he was much younger, trying to gain some benefits from him.

Zheng Danle (Zhang Zhenhuan), nicknamed Cool Man, is Jianan's only best friend and the only one not affected by his bad luck. On the outside, he doesn't seemed to be bothered about what's going on around him - but in the inside, he actually longed for a family love, which he envies the kinship between Jianan and Chen Xinshan. He's used to hiding his inner-self, which result in him not knowing how to express his love for Tian Zhenzhen.

Tian Zhenzhen (Carrie Wong), believes that love conquers everything. Her boyfriend often cheats on her - for that she fear that he might leave her, so she chose to turn a blind eye. She fell out with Junning for making Shiqian break up with her - not knowing that it's for her own good. A new affection between her and Danle is soon formed after knowing Shiqian's real intention.

After the breakup, Zhenzhen started feeling the same as Danle after he confess and they soon became a couple - knowing how well-protected she is when with Danle. On the other hand, knowing that the kiss between Junning and Jianan changed their lives upside down, she went to confront Jianan - where he willingly wants to kiss Junning back so that she can have her life back, regardless the fact that he will become a jinx to others again. Will they return to their original state if Junning and Jianan kiss?

== Cast ==
=== Main cast ===
Cast	Character	Description	Episodes Appeared
Rebecca Lim 林慧玲	Du Junning 杜均宁	Princess (王之女), Poison Ning (毒均宁): SG Vision property agent; Du Zitong's daughter; Du Junjie's elder sister; Tian Zhenzhen's colleague and friend; Zhou Yaowen's ex-girlfriend; Had an accidental kiss with Zhu Jianan; Life went against her when she realised that she could only speak the truth; Offended many of her customers, later resigned and work at Jia Le; Married Zhu Jianan and lived happily ever after in Episode 20	1 - 20
Elvin Ng 黄俊雄	Zhu Jianan 祝家南	Jinx (倒霉鬼), Stay Home Guy (住家男), Little Frog (小青蛙); Younger version portrayed by Damien Teo: Furniture designer; Boss of Jia Le; Cheng Xinshan's nephew; Zheng Danle's only best friend; In love with Du Junning at first sight; A jinx to people around him; except for his best friend Zheng Danle; Loves to watch Korean dramas; Often fantasizes himself as the male lead and Du Junning as the female lead of South Korean drama My Love from the Star; Had an accidental kiss with Du Junning; later unknowingly got rid of his bad luck and good things kept going to him; Married Du Junning and lived happily ever after in Episode 20	1 - 20
Zhang Zhenhuan 张振寰	Zheng Danle 郑丹乐	Cool Man (酷Man); Younger version portrayed by Ezekiel Chee: Qian Fengzhu's son; Zhu Jianan's only best friend; Co-boss of Jia Le; Tian Zhenzhen's boyfriend, later broke up; In love with Tian Zhenzhen after a kiss on the lips from her when she was drunk; Later fell out with Zhu Jianan over money issues; Left Zhu Jianan's house and went to Thailand to compete in a muay thai competition in Episode 20	1 - 20
Carrie Wong 黄思恬	Tian Zhenzhen 田珍珍	Mermaid (美人鱼): SG Vision property agent; Du Junning's colleague and best friend; Chen Shiqian's ex-girlfriend; Zheng Danle's girlfriend, later broke up; Once fall out with Du Junning over Chen Shiqian, later patched up; Kissed Zheng Danle on the lips while she was drunk; Later left SG Vision and worked at Jia Le	1 - 20

=== Other cast ===
Cast	Character	Description	Episodes Appeared
Xiang Yun 向云	Cheng Xinshan 程欣善	Zhu Jianan's aunt; Du Zitong's ex-lover	1, 3, 5, 7-20
Chantalle Ng 黄暄婷	Song Weiqiao 宋薇乔	In love with Zhu Jianan	
Zhu Houren 朱厚任	Du Zitong 杜梓通	Stomachache (肚子痛): Du Junning and Du Junjie's father; Cheng Xinshan's ex-lover	1 - 20
Brandon Wong 黄炯耀	Mai Dechu 麦德初	Villain: SG Vision property agent; Du Junning's colleague and rival	1-6, 8, 11, 14, 16-19
Jeffrey Xu 徐鸣杰	Xu Zhicheng 徐志诚	Zhu Jianan's tenant; In love with Tian Zhenzhen	1, 2, 4-7, 16-20
Maxi Lim 林俊良	Du Junjie 杜均杰	National Serviceman; Du Zitong's son; Du Junning's younger brother	1-5, 7, 12, 14, 20
Charles Lee 李家庆	Zhou Yaowen 周耀文	Cleanliness Freak (洁癖男): Doctor; Du Junning's ex-boyfriend	1, 3, 4, 6, 7, 15, 18, 19
Wang Yuqing 王昱清	Herman Wong	Du Junning and Mai Dechu's boss	1, 2, 6, 8, 14, 16-18
陈凤凌	Qian Fengzhu 钱凤珠	Zheng Danle's mother	7, 10, 12-16, 18-19
Hu Wensui			

== Trivia ==
- This is the first time that Elvin Ng and Rebecca Lim paired together.
- Snippets of the next episode are shown during the ending credits of each episode. This is the tenth series where News Tonight commentaries are not announced.
- Charles Lee's second Singaporean drama after 118.
- The series was repeated at 8am.
- The series is pre-empted on 11 Sep 2015 to air the live coverage of the results of the Singaporean general election 2015.
- The Series repeat its telecast on weekday 5.30pm in Feb 2016 succeeding Life Is Beautiful
- This Series repeat its telecast succeeding It Takes Two on 19 April 2021 at 4am.

== Awards and nominations ==
Sealed With A Kiss is nominated for two awards in Star Awards 2016. The series, along with Good Luck, is one of two Mediacorp series not to be nominated for any technical awards.

=== Star Awards 2016 ===
The Star Awards are presented by Mediacorp.

Star Awards – Acting Awards
Accolades	Category	Nominees	Result
Star Awards	Best Actress	Rebecca Lim	Nominated
Star Awards	Favourite Male Character	Zhang Zhenhuan	Nominated

=== Fame Awards 2016 ===
Awards
Award	Category	Recipients (if any)	Result
Fame Awards 2016	Best Actor in a Leading Role	Elvin Ng	Nominated
Fame Awards 2016	Best Actor in a Leading Role	Zhang Zhenhuan	Nominated
Fame Awards 2016	Best Actress in a Leading Role	Carrie Wong	Nominated
Fame Awards 2016	Best Actor in a Supporting Role	Zhu Houren	Nominated

== See also ==
- List of programmes broadcast by Mediacorp Channel 8
- List of Sealed With A Kiss episodes
