= The Journey (TV series) =

- 信约
- Genre: Period drama
- Written by: Ang Teng Tee 洪荣狄 (A Voyage and Tumultuous Times); Seah Choon Guan 谢俊源 (Our Homeland); Chen Siew Khoon 陈秀群 (Our Homeland)
- Directed by: Chong Liung Man 张龙敏; Loo Yin Yam 卢燕金 霍志楷 苏妙芳; Doreen Yap 叶佩娟; Loo Yin Kam 卢燕金; Png Keh Hock 方家福; Chen Yi You 陈忆幼
- Starring: Li Nanxing; Elvin Ng; Desmond Tan; Joanne Peh; Jeanette Aw; Chris Tong; Pierre Png; Shaun Chen; Romeo Tan; Andie Chen; Felicia Chin; Carrie Wong; Chen Hanwei; Rui En; Zhang Zhen Huan; Rebecca Lim; Shane Pow; Ian Fang; Julie Tan; Jeffrey Xu
- Opening theme: 家乡 by Alfred Sim (A Voyage) 信。约 by Kelvin Tan & Joi Chua (Tumultuous Times) 梦里家园 by Olivia Ong (Our Homeland)
- Country of origin: Singapore
- No. of seasons: 3
- No. of episodes: 91 (list of episodes)

Production
- Executive producers: Chia Mien Yang 谢敏洋 (A Voyage); Chong Liung Man 张龙敏 (Tumultuous Times); Wong Kuang Yong 黄光荣 (Our Homeland)
- Producer: Kwek Leng Soong 郭令送 (A Voyage)
- Running time: approx. 45 minutes (exc. advertisements)

Original release
- Network: MediaCorp
- Release: 25 November 2013 – 26 August 2015

Related
- The Awakening (1984); The Price of Peace (1997); Stepping Out (1999); In Pursuit of Peace (2001); The Little Nyonya (2008); Together (2009); Tuesday Report: The Towkays (2013); Tuesday Report: The Towkays 2 (2014); Tuesday Report: Where The Heart Is (2015)

The Journey (Chinese: 信约) is a Singaporean transmedia project about the story of Singapore, aired from 2013 to 2015. It consists of three parts: A Voyage, which is about the early settlers that arrived in Singapore, Tumultuous Times, which is about the Second World War, as well as Singapore's road to independence, and Our Homeland, which is about Singapore's progress as a nation, which is slated to wrap up during Singapore's 50th birthday. The drama trilogy focuses on a fictional depiction of the events and lives of the people in each era.

== Cast Timeline ==
Note: A gray cell indicates that the character did not appear in that medium.

Cast	Character	Seasons		
Cast	Character	1	2	3
Li Nanxing	Zhang Tianpeng 张天鹏	Main	Supporting	
Elvin Ng	Zhang Dong'en 张东恩	Main		
Desmond Tan	Hong Shi 洪石	Main	Supporting	
Joanne Peh	Zhang Huiniang 张蕙娘	Main	Guest	
Jeanette Aw	Lin Yazi 林鸭子	Main	Supporting	
Chris Tong	Bai Mingzhu 白明珠	Main	Supporting	
Pierre Png	Hei Long 黑龙	Main		
Allen Chen	Zhang Tianying 张天鹰	Supporting	Guest	
Terence Cao	Zhang Guangda 张广达	Supporting		
Carole Lin	Huang Zhenniang 黄珍娘	Supporting		
Priscelia Chan	Han Xiuxiang 韩秀香	Supporting		
Shaun Chen	Hu Jia/Zhang Jia 胡佳/张佳	Younger version	Main	Main
Romeo Tan	Zhang Yan 张晏	Younger version	Main	Guest
Andie Chen	Hong Dangyong 洪当勇	Younger version	Main	Supporting
Jeanette Aw	Hong Minghui 洪明慧	Younger version	Main	Guest
Felicia Chin	Zhang Min 张敏	Younger version	Main	Main
Carrie Wong	Bai Lanxiang 白兰香		Main	
Chen Hanwei	Hu Weiren 胡为人		Main	
Rui En	Yang Meixue 杨美雪			Main
Zhang Zhen Huan	Yan Yisheng 严义生			Main
Romeo Tan	Hong Kuan 洪宽		Younger version	Main
Rebecca Lim	Wan Fei Fei 万菲菲			Main
Shane Pow	Wan Zi Hua 万子华			Main
Ian Fang	Wan Zi Cong 万子聪		Younger version	Main
Julie Tan	Yao Jia Hui 姚嘉惠			Main
Jeffrey Xu	Hong Rui 洪锐		Younger version	Main
Darren Lim	Dai Xiaoxiong 戴晓雄			Supporting
Cheryl Wee	Wan Fangfang 万芳芳			Supporting
James Seah	Yan Yi Min 严义民			Supporting
Chen Guohua	Wan Shan 万山		Guest	Supporting

== Development ==
The dramas are the first periodical dramas in Singapore to use CGI. This is done with the help of 27 students from Diploma in Digital Visual Effects in Nanyang Polytechnic.
