= Mind Game (TV series) =

- 心迷
- Genre: Crime Drama; Suspense; Psychological; Romance
- Directed by: Ng Lai Huat 黄来发
- Starring: Tay Ping Hui 郑斌辉; Joanne Peh 白薇秀; Zhang Yaodong 张耀栋; Paige Chua 蔡琦慧
- Opening theme: 心迷 (Mind Games) by Wu Jiali & Chris Tong
- Country of origin: Singapore
- Original languages: Mandarin, with English and Chinese Subtitles
- No. of episodes: 30

Production
- Production locations: Kuala Lumpur, Malaysia
- Running time: approx. 45 minutes
- Production company: MediaCorp Studios Malaysia

Original release
- Network: Mediacorp Channel 8
- Release: 7 May – 17 June 2015

Related
- Tiger Mum; Super Senior

Mind Game (Chinese: 心迷) is a Singaporean crime drama produced by Mediacorp Channel 8, produced by its Malaysian subsidiary MediaCorp Studios Malaysia. The show aired at 9pm on weekdays and had a repeat telecast at 8am the following day. This drama involves many plot twists and cases that requires strong thinking to solve the cases. This drama stars Tay Ping Hui, Joanne Peh, Zhang Yaodong and Paige Chua.

== Plot ==
The drama contains many cases which has unexpected twists and suspense. On every cases, a paralegal, a police, a psychologist and a mysterious woman with the ability to predict the future will help and solve difficult cases. Liang Wenjie is a paralegal with a sharp mind and he is determined to find his long-lost sister who turned out to be dead. While finding his long-lost sister, he met Feng Xuezhi who helped him with many things.

Guo Yongyan, a psychologist, met Zhao Anni and helped each other in cases. Together, four of them remain successful in solving cases until they realize a traitor among four of them...

== Cast ==
=== Main cast ===
- Tay Ping Hui as Liang Wenjie. A paralegal who helps in solving cases.
- Joanne Peh as Zhao Anni A policewoman
- Zhang Yaodong as Guo Yongyan, a psychologist
- Paige Chua as Feng Xuezhi, a woman with a supernatural ability to predict the future
- Vivian Liu as Liang Huixin

=== Supporting cast ===
Cast	Role	Description
Akit Tay	Wu Ke'er	Wu Yuan's daughter Liang Wenjie's godsister A patient of Guo Yongyan
Jack Tan	Hong Junrong	Hong Dali's adoptive son Guo Jinming's son Guo Yongyan's step-brother
Terence Cao	Li Zhengbang/Wang Dawei	
Apple Hong	Linda	Guo Yongyan's fiancee
Ye Shipin	Uncle Chen	Police
Yuan Shuai	Jason	Police
Henry Heng	Wu Yuan	Lawyer; Liang Wenjie's superior Wu Ke'er's father

== Episodes ==
No.	Title	Original release date
1	"Episode One"	May 7, 2015
2	"Episode Two"	May 8, 2015
3	"Episode Three"	May 11, 2015
4	"Episode Four"	May 12, 2015
5	"Episode Five"	May 13, 2015
6	"Episode Six"	May 14, 2015
7	"Episode Seven"	May 15, 2015
8	"Episode Eight"	May 18, 2015
9	"Episode Nine"	May 19, 2015
10	"Episode Ten"	May 20, 2015
11	"Episode Eleven"	May 21, 2015
12	"Episode Twelve"	May 22, 2015
13	"Episode Thirteen"	May 25, 2015
14	"Episode Fourteen"	May 26, 2015
15	"Episode Fifteen"	May 27, 2015
16	"Episode Sixteen"	May 28, 2015
17	"Episode Seventeen"	May 29, 2015
18	"Episode Eighteen"	June 1, 2015
19	"Episode Nineteen"	June 2, 2015
20	"Episode Twenty"	June 3, 2015
21	"Episode Twenty-one"	June 4, 2015
22	"Episode Twenty-two"	June 5, 2015
23	"Episode Twenty-three"	June 8, 2015
24	"Episode Twenty-four"	June 9, 2015
25	"Episode Twenty-five"	June 10, 2015
26	"Episode Twenty-six"	June 11, 2015
27	"Episode Twenty-seven"	June 12, 2015
28	"Episode Twenty-eight"	June 15, 2015
29	"Episode Twenty-nine"	June 16, 2015
30	"Episode Thirty"	June 17, 2015

== Awards and nominations ==
Mind Game was nominated for only one technical award category in Star Awards 2016. Ng Lai Huat was nominated for Best Director, but lost to Loh Woon Woon from The Dream Makers II.

Awards
Award	Category	Recipients (if any)	Result
Star Awards 2016 Backstage Achievement Awards 红星大奖2016之幕后英雄颁奖礼	Best Director 最佳导演	Ng Lai Huat 黄来发	Nominated

== See also ==
- List of programmes broadcast by Mediacorp Channel 8
