= Star Awards for Most Hated Villain =

Singaporean television award

- Current: Star Awards 2024
- Awarded for: Most Hated Villain by an Actor or Actress
- Country: Singapore
- Presented by: MediaCorp
- First award: 2010
- Currently held by: Zhang Ze Tong — All That Glitters (2024)

Highlights
- Most nominations: Chen Tianwen

The Star Awards for Most Hated Villain is an award presented annually at the Star Awards. It is given to an actor or actress who portrayed a drama series villain that is deemed the most hated among the television audience.

== History ==
The Star Awards for Unforgettable Villain category was introduced in 2010, at the 16th Star Awards ceremony. The nominees were determined by a team of judges employed by MediaCorp. Winners are selected by a majority vote from the public.

The award was retired immediately after its first award in 2010 and was subsequently revived in 2022 with a new title, Most Hated Villain.

Chen Tianwen is the most nominated actor in this category with two nominations. As of the 2024 Star Awards, Zhang Ze Tong is the most recent winner in this category for his role in All That Glitters.

== Recipient ==
Year	Actor	Role (title)	Nominees	Ref
Unforgettable Villain
2010	Jerry Yeo	Ye Rende (The Ultimatum)	Chen Tianwen — Lu Gua (Love Blossoms II); Patricia Mok — Yun Caixia (Love Blossoms II); Constance Song — Jiang Ruolin (The Ultimatum); Desmond Tan — Lin Dehua (Together)	
Most Hated Villain
2022	Brandon Wong	Qian Nanhua (Recipe of Life)	Chen Tianwen 陈天文 - Mister Flower 花花公子 as Zhu Guodong 朱国栋; Guo Liang 郭亮 - CTRL 操控 as Liang Wendao 梁文道; Huang Biren 黄碧仁- Recipe of Life 味之道 as Chen Huiying 陈惠瑛; Jeffrey Xu 徐鸣杰- The Takedown 肃战肃绝 as Lin Jinxiong 林金雄	
2023	Jeffrey Xu	Gu Wangming (Dark Angel)	Cavin Soh 苏志城 - Dark Angel 黑天使 as Su Zhian 苏知安; Darren Lim 林明伦 -Genie In A Cup 挖到宝 as Ma Xiaobao 马小包; Lina Ng 黄素芳 - Your World In Mine 你的世界我们懂 as Xiuzhu 秀珠; Priscelia Chan 曾诗梅 - Your World In Mine 你的世界我们懂 as Chen Linlin 陈琳琳	
2024	Zhang Ze Tong	Richard Mo (All That Glitters)	Shaun Chen 陈泓宇 - My One and Only 只此一家 as Andy; Chen Hui Hui 陈慧慧 - My One and Only 只此一家 as May; Brandon Wong 黄炯耀 - SHERO as Yang Hua Biao 杨华标; Jeffrey Xu 徐鸣杰 - Strike Gold 黄金巨塔 as Ke Nan 柯男	
