= Have a Little Faith (TV series) =

- Also known as: Trust Me, Trust Me Not
- 相信我
- Genre: Drama; Romance; Dramedy
- Created by: Lau Chin Poon 刘清盆
- Directed by: 苏妙芳 Su Miao Fang 马家骏 Ma Jia Jun
- Starring: Rui En; Zhang Zhenhuan; Jeffrey Xu; Chen Shucheng; Jayley Woo; Marcus Chin
- Opening theme: Faith (信任指数) by Lin Si Tong & Yang Min
- Ending theme: 重遇自己 by Lin Si Tong
- Country of origin: Singapore
- Original language: Chinese
- No. of episodes: 20

Production
- Executive producer: Wong Kuang Yong 黄光荣
- Running time: approx. 45 minutes (excluding advertisements)

Original release
- Network: Mediacorp Channel 8
- Release: 3 July – 28 July 2017

Related
- The Lead; When Duty Calls

Have a Little Faith (Chinese: 相信我) is a 20-episode Singaporean drama produced and telecast on Mediacorp Channel 8. It stars Rui En, Zhang Zhenhuan, Jeffrey Xu, Chen Shucheng, Jayley Woo and Marcus Chin as the casts of this series.

== Casts ==
=== Main Casts ===
Cast	Character	Description	Ref
Rui En	Liang Sijie 梁思洁	Younger version portrayed by Toh Xin Hui; Teenage version portrayed by Shanice Koh (16y/o); Jiang Xiaoxi (江晓溪): Shen Mingren and Zhou Jiannan's love interest; Zhou Fangdong's tenant; Shen Mingren, Qian Zaide and Zhuang Kelian's co-tenant; In love with Shen Mingren; Qian Leqi's best friend; Suffered from schizophrenia	
Zhang Zhenhuan	Shen Mingren 沈明仁	Mysterious Man (神秘人), Serial Killer (凶手): Former fashion designer; Qian Leqi's love interest/idol; Liang Siyu's ex-boyfriend; Zhou Jiannan's rival in love; Zhou Fangdong's tenant; Jiang Xiaoxi, Qian Zaide and Zhuang Kelian's co-tenant; In love with Liang Sijie	
Jeffrey Xu	Zhou Jiannan 周建南	Steven Chow, Wretched Man (死贱男): Formal assistant director, former Accountant; Zhou Fangdong and Zhang Huixian's son; Zhou Jiayi's younger brother; Sky Kim's maternal uncle; Kim Moo-jeon's brother-in-law; In love with Liang Sijie & Qian Leqi; Shen Mingren's rival in love	
Chen Shucheng	Zhou Fangdong 周方东	Mr Landlord (房东先生), Fortune Teller (算命神算, Clairvoyant Of The East Seas (东海神算): Fortune teller; Liang Sijie, Shen Mingren, Zhuang Kelian and Qian Zaide's landlord; Zhang Huixian's husband; Kim Moo-jeon's father-in-law; Zhou Jiannan and Zhou Jiayi's father; Zhang Tiansheng and Old Wang's best friend; Sky Kim's maternal grandfather	
Jayley Woo	Qian Leqi 钱乐琪	Money Happy Qi: Aspiring Actress; Qian Zaide's daughter; In love with Shen Mingren and Zhou Jiannan; Liang Sijie's best-friend; Has kleptomania whenever she is feeling down	
Marcus Chin	Qian Zaide 钱载德	Deadbeat (欠载的), 4D King (多多王/马票王), Uncle De (德叔): Ex-Security guard and Ex- private car hire driver; Coffee shop's cleaner; Qian Leqi's father; Zhou Fangdong's tenant; Jiang Xiaoxi, Shen Mingren and Zhuang Kelian's co-tenant	

=== Supporting Casts ===
Cast	Character	Description
Aileen Tan	Zhuang Kelian 庄可莲	Chong Kor Lian, Miss Wang (王太太), Really Pity (真可怜), Jingle Bells: Zhuang Dagou's daughter; Old Wang's wife; Huang Jinyuan's mother; Zhou Fangdong's tenant; Suffered from dementia after her husband had died
Denise Camillia Tan	Liang Siyu 梁思雨	Younger version portrayed by Natalie Tan; Teenage version portrayed by Chloe Ng (15y/o) Jiang Siyu (江思雨): Jiang Xiaoxi's younger sister; Li Qiuhe's younger daughter; Shen Mingren's ex-girlfriend; (Deceased - 2 years ago)
Lina Ng 黄嫊芳	Li Qiuhe 李秋荷	Mentally Unstable Patient: Liang Sijie and Liang Siyu's mother; Suffered from depression that's cause her to be mentally unstable
Henry Thia 程旭辉	Zhang Tiansheng 张添胜	Ah Sheng (阿胜), Robert: Clothing shop's ex-boss; Zhou Fangdong's best friend; Meifen's ex-boyfriend
Eelyn Kok 郭蕙雯	Zhou Jiayi 周家仪	Zhou Fangdong and Zhang Huixian's daughter; Zhou Jiannan's elder sister; Kim Moo-jeon's wife; Sky Kim's mother
Dick Su 苏才忠	Kim Moo-jeon 金茂全	Zhou Jiayi's husband; Sky Kim's father; Zhou Fangdong and Zhang Huixian's son-in-law; Zhou Jiannan's brother-in-law
Perez Tay 郑传峻	Sky Kim	Zhou Fangdong and Zhang Huixian's grandson; Kim Moo-jeon and Zhou Jiayi's son; Zhou Jiannan's nephew

=== Other Casts ===
Cast	Character	Description
William Lawandi 刘峻宏	Ben	Villain: Director; Zhou Jiannan's ex-boss; Cheated Qian Leqi's money to invest a movie
Desmond Ng 黄振隆	Jeff	Zhou Jiannan's former classmate; Cai Shaofang's husband
Sherraine Law 罗翊琦	Cai Shaofang 蔡少芳	Real Tom-boy 真(男人婆): Jeff's wife
Chase Tan		Zhou Jiannan's former classmate
Tommy Wong 王昌黎	Old Wang 老王	Zhou Fangdong's friend; Zhuang Kelian's husband; Huang Jinyuan's father; Zhuang Dagou's son-in-law; (Deceased - In Episode 1)
Chen Silun 陈斯倫	Tim	
Wu Jianhua 吴建华	Fatty Xiong 胖子雄	
Zhang Wei 张为	Uncle Wang 汪伯	Sold Chee Cheong Fun to Jiang Xiaoxi in episode 5
Marcus Mok 莫健发	Alan	Tina's husband; (Arrested - in Episode 5)
Abby Lai 黎嘉希	Tina	Alan's wife
Wu Wantong 吴萬彤	Angie	Alan's mistress
Yu Li'ai 余丽爱	Auntie Fang 方太	
Kelly Lim LT 林俐廷	Auntie Hong 洪嫂	Vegetables' stall owner at the market; Ah Qiang's mother; Suffered from third stage leukemia
Phua Yida 潘昱达	Ah Qiang 阿强	Auntie Hong's son; Was hit by a flower pot in Episode 15
Teo Ser Lee 张思丽	Karen	Accused Shen Mingren of molesting her in public
Li Fuliang 李福樑	Ken	Villain: Carrie's husband; Drilled holes on the walls to spotcheck Jiang Xiaoxi; Attempted to throw flower pot at Jiang Xiaoxi but it hit Ah Qiang; Attempted to knock over Jiang Xiaoxi but was stopped by Shen Mingren
June Lim 林惠贞	Carrie	Ken's wife; (Deceased - mentioned by Ken)
Shannon Zann 苏仪珍		Sky's teacher-in-charge
Ye Qingting 葉菁廷	Mei Fen 美芬	Zhang Tiansheng's ex-girlfriend
Cat Ang 翁慧霖	Jane	Qian Zaide's mistress
Chen Nansong 陈南松		Qian Zaide's colleague
Henry Heng 王利秦	Mr Gan	Villain: Kidnapped Jiang Xiaoxi and start spreading rumors about her to everyone in episode 16
Yang Rui Yao 杨瑞耀		Mr Gan's father
He Peibin 何培斌	Ali 阿力	
Teddy	James	Villain: A pervert producer; Shen Mingren's friend; Drugged Qian Leqi and almost molested her but was stopped by Jiang Xiaoxi in episode 6
Louis Wu	Huang Jinyuan 黄进远	Mr Huang (黄律师): Lawyer; Old Wang and Zhuang Kelian's son; Zhuang Dagou's grandson
Guan Yazhu 关雅珠	Ah Xia 阿霞	Fruit Seller; Ah Hua's mother; (Deceased - in Episode 16)
Alvin Zhan 詹煇朕	Ah Hua 阿华	Villain: Ah Xia's son; Sexually assaulted Jiang xiaoxi when she was young.; Raped Jiang Xiaoxi a few years back; (Deceased - in Episode 16)
Larry Low 刘龙伟		A pub/club manager
Guo Jinrong 郭锦荣	Bruce	A pub/club bodyguard
Chen Meiyu 陈美玉		A pub/club cleaner
Charmaine Sei 薛素丽	Ann	
Uncredited	Zhuang Dagou 庄大狗	Zhuang Kelian's father; Old Wang's father-in-law; Huang Jinyuan's maternal grandfather
Chen Juanjuan 陈娟娟	Zhang Huixian 张惠娴	Zhou Fangdong's wife; Zhou Jiayi's and Zhou Jiannan's mother; Sky Kim's maternal grandmother; Kim Moo-jeon's mother-in-law; (Deceased - long time ago)
Chen Ruixing 陈瑞兴		Pork shops boss
Chen Huiling 陈惠苓		

== Original Sound Track (OST) ==
No.	Song title	Singer(s)
1)	信任指数 (Main Song for the series)	Lin Si Tong 林思彤 & Yang Min 杨敏
2)	重遇自己	Lin Si Tong 林思彤

== Accolades ==
Year	Ceremony	Category	Nominees	Result	Ref
2018	Star Awards	Best Screenplay 最佳剧本	Lau Chin Poon 刘清盆	Nominated	
2018	Star Awards	Best Drama Serial	—N/a	Nominated	
2018	Star Awards	Best Supporting Actress	Aileen Tan	Nominated	
2018	Star Awards	Best Supporting Actor	Marcus Chin	Nominated	

== See also ==
- List of MediaCorp Channel 8 Chinese drama series (2010s)
