= Yue Xin =

Yue Xin is the name of:

- Yue Xin (footballer) (born 1995), Chinese association footballer
- Yue Xin (activist) (born 1990s), Chinese feminist and student-activist

== See also ==
- Yuexin Township (岳新乡), a township in Anyue County, Sichuan, China
- Xin Yue (disambiguation)
