= A Blessed Life =

- 吉人天相
- Genre: Pioneer Generation
- Written by: Lau Ching Poon 刘清盆
- Starring: Li Nanxing; Chen Liping; Zhu Houren; Brandon Wong; Richard Low; Youyi
- Opening theme: 最大的骄傲 by Cavin Soh
- Ending theme: 张三的歌 by 张子丝
- Country of origin: Singapore
- Original languages: Mandarin, with some English dialogue
- No. of episodes: 8

Production
- Executive producer: Winnie Wong 王尤红

Original release
- Network: Mediacorp Channel 8
- Release: January 29 – April 2, 2015

Related
- Old Is Gold (2019); Old Is Gold: The Bliss Keeper (2019)

A Blessed Life (Chinese: 吉人天相) is a Singaporean Chinese sitcom sponsored by Pioneer Generation Package, produced by MediaCorp Channel 8. It stars Li Nanxing, Chen Liping, Zhu Houren, Brandon Wong, Richard Low and Youyi as the main characters of the sitcom. It revolves around a group of old men fulfilling their dreams to perform band on stage.

== Cast ==
- Li Nanxing as Ye Daji
- Chen Liping as Ye Da
- Zhu Houren as Wang Youguo
- Brandon Wong as Zhu Yongwen
- Richard Low as Huang Jinshan
- Youyi as Chen Jiexi
- Ivan Lo as Xie Tingfeng
- Kym Ng as Jenny Wang Zhenni
- Lin Meijiao as Bai Meiling
- Xu Bin as Huang Jiaquan
- Wang Yuqing as Ming

== Episodic guide ==
No. overall	Title	Original release date
1	"Episode 1" "Encounter (遇见)"	29 January 2015 PG
2	"Episode 2" "Nice Man (好人)"	5 February 2015 PG
3	"Episode 3" "Handphone (手机)"	12 February 2015 PG
4	"Episode 4" "Temptation (诱惑)"	26 February 2015 PG
5	"Episode 5" "Gift (礼物)"	5 March 2015 PG
6	"Episode 6" "Forgiveness (原谅)"	12 March 2015 PG
7	"Episode 7" "Dreams (梦想)"	19 March 2015 PG
8	"Episode 8 (Finale)"	2 April 2015 PG

== Awards and nominations ==
A Blessed Life is nominated for two award categories in Star Awards 2016.

=== Star Awards 2016 ===
Awards
Award	Category	Recipients (if any)	Result
Star Awards 2016 Backstage Achievement Awards 红星大奖2016之幕后英雄颁奖礼	Best Set Design for Drama Programme 最佳戏剧布景设计	Oh Hock Leong 胡福隆	Nominated
Star Awards 2016 Show 2 红星大奖2016 下半场	Young Talent Award 青苹果奖	Ivan Lo 卢楷浚	Nominated

== See also ==
- List of MediaCorp Channel 8 Chinese drama series (2010s)
