= Brandon Wong (actor) =

Singaporean actor

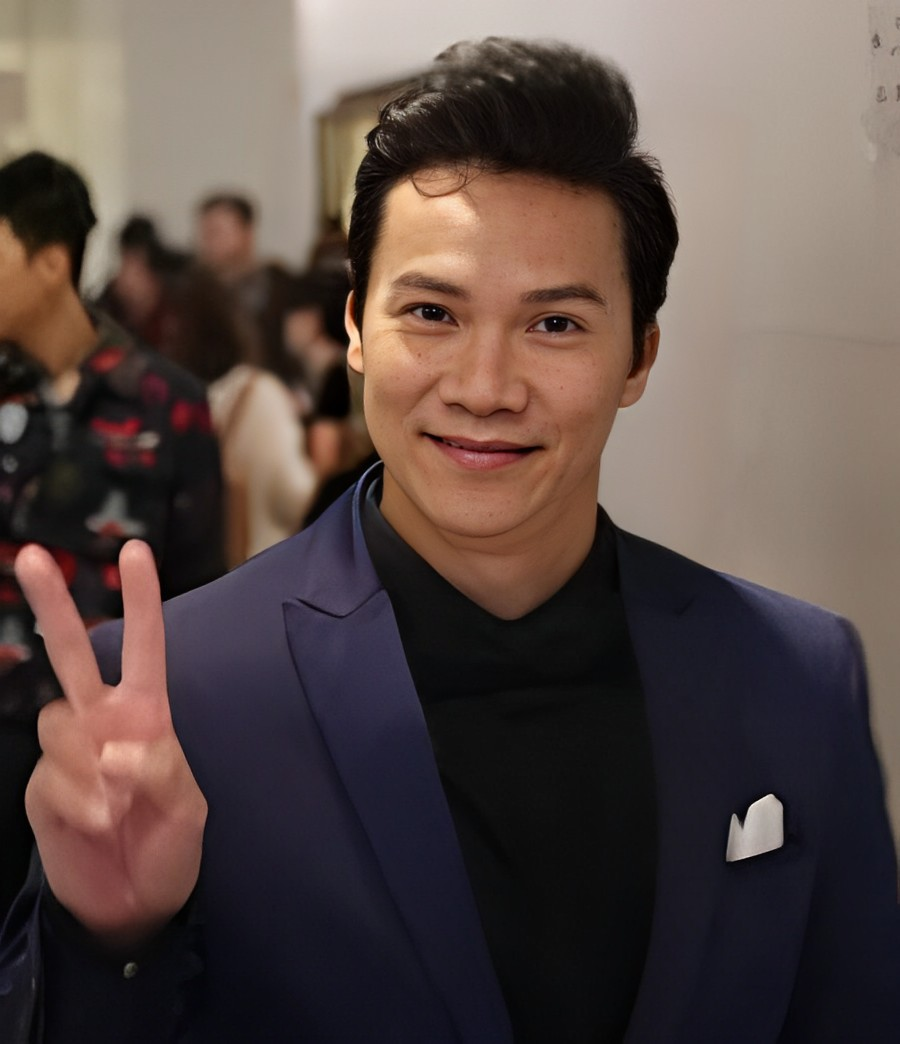
- Wong at the Star Awards 2017
- Born: Malaysia
- Education: Universiti Teknologi Malaysia
- Occupation: Actor
- Years active: 1995–present
- Spouse: Helen Lee (m. 2004)
- Children: 3
- Awards: Star Awards 2022 & 2023 : Top 10 Most Popular Male Artiste; Star Awards 2022 : Most Hated Villain; Star Awards 2023 : Best Supporting Actor

Chinese name
- Traditional Chinese: 黄炯耀
- Simplified Chinese: 黄炯耀
- Hanyu Pinyin: Huáng Jiǒngyào

Brandon Wong is a Singaporean actor.

== Career ==
Wong joined Star Search Singapore in 1995 after graduating from Universiti Teknologi Malaysia. Although he did not make the finals, he was offered a contract by the Television Corporation of Singapore (predecessor of MediaCorp) and entered the entertainment industry. He made his breakthrough in the long-running hit series Wok of Life, playing the late Asian comedian Wang Sha.

In Star Awards 2018, Wong was nominated for Best Supporting Actor for the drama, My Friends From Afar.

In Star Awards 2022, Wong won his first awards, Top 10 Most Popular Male Artiste and Most Hated Villain, after 27 years in the industry. At Star Awards 2023, Wong won his first acting award, Best Supporting Actor, for his role in Dark Angel.

== Personal life ==
Born in Malaysia, Wong became a Singapore citizen in 2009. He is married with three sons.

== Filmography ==
=== Television series ===
Year	Title	Role	Notes	Ref.
1995	Tofu Street			
1995	Of Cops And Men			
1996	River of Love			
1996	The Legend of Ji Gong			
1997	Men at the Crossroad			
1997	My Big Brother			
1997	Courage of Fire			
1997	The Price of Peace			
1997	Not The Facts			
1997	Places in My Heart			
1998	Riding The Storm			
1998	Myths And Legends of Singapore			
1998	Act 235			
1998	Dreams			
1999	The Legendary Swordsman			
1999	Snag			
1999	Darling-In-Law			
1999	Mr. OK			
1999	Wok of Life			
2000	Heroes in Black			
2000	The Tax Files			
2001	No Problem			
2001	Bukit Ho Swee			
2001	Lucky Numbers			
2001	The Hotel			
2002	Springs of Life			
2003	Lobang King			
2003	A Child's Hope			
2004	Man at Forty			
2004	Zhong Wu Yan			
2004	To Mum with Love			
2005	The Rainbow Connection			
2005	Portrait of Home II	Bryan		
2005	Zero to Hero	Ah Bao (Alex)		
2006	A Million Treasures	Ah Qing		
2006	C.I.D.	Zhang Zhihua		
2006	The Undisclosed	Raymond		
2007	The Homecoming	Lai Guoqiang		
2007	Kinship	Martin		
2007	Kinship II 手足 II	Martin		
2007	Metamorphosis	Rattlesnake		
2008	Nanny Daddy			
2008	Crime Busters x 2	Du Jialong		
2008	By My Side	Grey Dog		
2009	Housewives' Holiday	Chen Weibin		
2010	With You	Zhang Wei		
2010	Unriddle	Wu Guosheng		
2011	Devotion	Wang Ruiji		
2011	On the Fringe 2011	Ah Qing		
2011	Love Thy Neighbour	Crazy Knife		
2012	Unriddle 2	Liang Zhichao		
2012	Joys of Life	Wang Xia		
2012	Don't Stop Believin'	Zhong Guo'an		
2012	Poetic Justice	Eric		
2013	The Recruit Diaries 阿兵新传	Older Ye Laixiang		
2013	It's A Wonderful Life	Ma Lin Shu		
2013	Love At Risk	Hei-ge		
2013	Sudden	He Jianming		
2014	World at Your Feet	Mo Shijing		
2014	Mystic Whispers 听	Liu Guangming		
2014	Against The Tide	Zhao Junlong		
2014	The Journey: Tumultuous Times	Bai Gou		
2015	A Blessed Life	Zhu Yongwen		
2015	Tiger Mum	Robert Leow		
2015	Sealed with a Kiss	Mai Dechu		
2015	Life - Fear Not	Lin Dashou		
2015	Hand In Hand	Bai Guang		
2016	The Truth Seekers	Wang Kunxing		
2016	The Dream Job	Liang Yongqiang		
2016	Provision Shop 杂货店	Ah Cheng	Telemovie	
2016	Eat Already?	Daniel		
2016	Hero	Zhang Zhiming		
2017	118 II	Liu Dali		
2017	My Friends from Afar	Chen Xiaolong		
2017	My Ailen Girlfriend 我的知星女友	Chen Xiaolong		
2018	Reach for the Skies 不平凡的平凡	Zhuo Zhiliang		
2019	How Are You?	Ah Min		
2019	Hello From The Other Side 阴错阳差	Lao Ma		
2019	Hello From The Other Side - Its Time 阴错阳差 – 时辰到	Lao Ma		
2019	All Is Well 你那边怎样.我这边OK	Benson		
2019	Last Madame	Lou Seh		
2019	C.L.I.F. 5 警微天职5之海岸卫队	Wu Ziwei		
2020	My Guardian Angels 单翼天使	Tang Younian		
2021	Recipe of Life 味之道	Qian Nanhua		
2021	My Star Bride	Ah Zhong		
2021	The Peculiar Pawnbroker 人心鉴定师	Qiu Qingfeng / Zhou Ligong		
2021	Leave No Soul Behind 21点灵	Feng Tianlong		
2022	Sisters Stand Tall 快跑吧, 丽娇	Huang Qingfa		
2022	When Duty Calls 2 卫国先锋2	Wu Xiangsheng		
2022	Dark Angel 黑天使	Ke Zhixiong		
2022	Love At First Bite 遇见你，真香！	Richard		
2023	Shero	Yang Huabiao		
2023	My One and Only	Hao Jian		

=== Film ===
Year	Title	Role	Notes	Ref.
2023	What is Love	A-wei	Short film	

== Awards and nominations ==
Year	Ceremony	Category	Nominated work	Result	Ref
1999	Star Awards	Best Supporting Actor	Wok of Life (as Wang Xia)	Nominated	
2007	Star Awards	Best Supporting Actor	The Homecoming (as Lai Guoqiang)	Nominated	
2010	Star Awards	Best Actor	Housewives' Holiday (as Chen Weibin)	Nominated	
2012	Star Awards	Best Supporting Actor	Love Thy Neighbour (as Shen Jindao)	Nominated	
2018	Star Awards	Best Supporting Actor	My Friends From Afar (as Chen Xiaolong)	Nominated	
2020	Asian Television Awards	Best Actor in a Supporting Role	Last Madame (as Lou Seh)	Nominated	
2021	Star Awards	Best Supporting Actor	Hello From The Other Side (as Lao Ma)	Nominated	
2022	Star Awards	Top 10 Most Popular Male Artistes	—N/a	Top 10	
2022	Star Awards	Most Hated Villain	Recipe of Life (as Qian Nanhua)	Won	
2022	Seoul Webfest 2022	Best Supporting Actor	The Peculiar Pawnbroker (as Qiu Qingfeng)	Nominated	
2023	Star Awards	Best Actor	Leave No Soul Behind (as Feng Tianlong)	Nominated	
2023	Star Awards	Best Supporting Actor	Dark Angel (as Ke Zhixiong)	Won	
2023	Star Awards	Top 10 Most Popular Male Artistes	—N/a	Top 10	
2024	Star Awards	Most Hated Villain	SHERO (as Yang Huabiao)	Nominated	
2024	Star Awards	Top 10 Most Popular Male Artistes	—N/a	Nominated	
