= Jayley Woo =

Singaporean actress (born 1991)

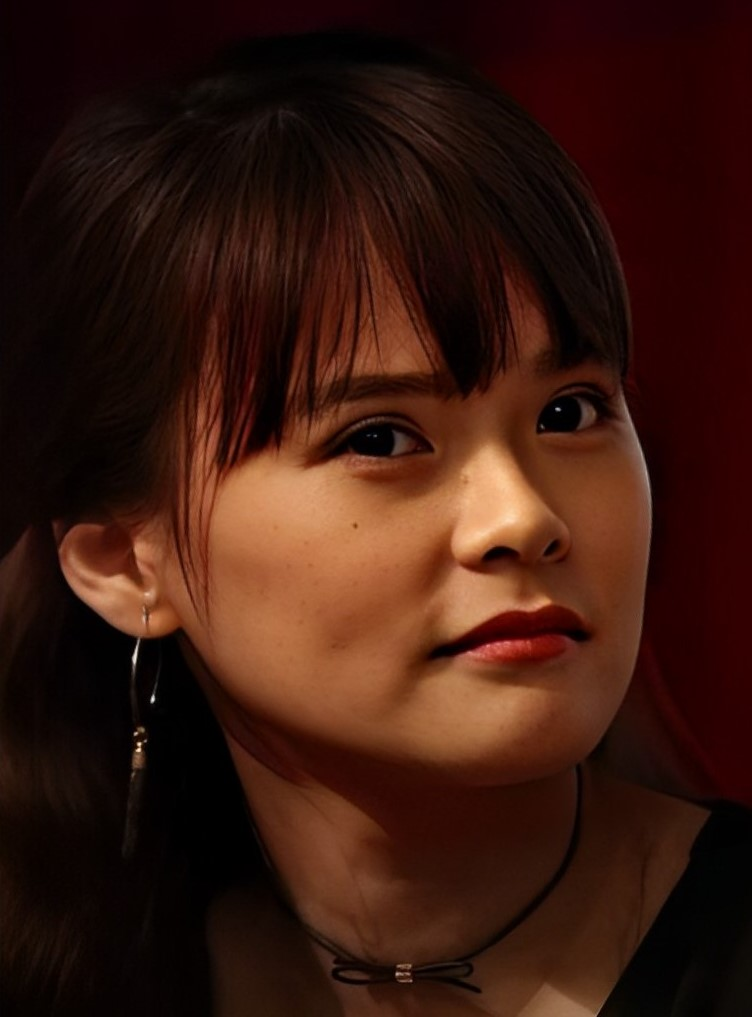
- Woo in September 2017
- Born: 27 December 1991 (age 34); Singapore
- Education: Tanglin Secondary School
- Alma mater: ITE College West
- Occupation: Actress
- Years active: 2012–present
- Spouse: Bryan Tan (m. 2022)
- Children: 1
- Family: Hayley Woo (sister)

Chinese name
- Chinese: 胡佳琪
- Hanyu Pinyin: Hú Jiāqí

Jayley Woo Jia Qi (born 27 December 1991) is a Singaporean actress and businesswoman who was a full-time MediaCorp artiste from 2012 to 2018. She has an identical twin sister, Hayley Woo, who is also an actress and she is the younger of the twin.

== Early life ==
Born to Malaysian parents, Woo studied in Tanglin Secondary School and ITE Clementi.

== Career ==
Woo was a blogger alongside her older twin sister, Hayley Woo, under the stage name Jay On The Hay.

In 2012, she made her debut by appearing in Jump! alongside Jeanette Aw and Zhang Zhenhuan. Her work in the series garnered her a Best Newcomer nomination at the Star Awards 2013.

In 2013, she starred in C.L.I.F., 96°C Cafe and The Dream Makers. She also made a cameo appearance in Sudden.

In 2014, she filmed The Caregivers, C.L.I.F. 3 and Against The Tide. She was nominated for Top 10 Most Popular Female Artistes award at the Star Awards 2015 and won the award in Star Awards 2016 and Star Awards 2017.

In 2015, she filmed You Can Be an Angel Too, Tiger Mom and Super Senior and made a cameo appearance in The Journey: Our Homeland.

In 2016, she had her first leading role in The Queen. In the same year, she also filmed Beyond Words and Peace & Prosperity, made cameo appearances in Hero and Soul Reaper, a Toggle original series.

In 2017, she filmed Dream Coder, Have A Little Faith and Life Less Ordinary.

In 2018, she wrapped up filming in a Toggle original series, Love At Cavenagh Bridge, and a science fiction English series, Glitch!. She also starred in Jalan Jalan.

In July 2018, Woo left Mediacorp as a full-time artist. The actress wrote in a Facebook post on 3 July 2018 that she will still be taking on suitable acting roles despite leaving Mediacorp. Woo is reportedly pursuing potential opportunities overseas, including possible projects in China.

== Personal life ==
Woo was in a romantic relationship with actor Aloysius Pang which began in 2017. Shortly after Pang's death in 2019, Woo revealed that she and Pang had initially planned to go public after their impending wedding.

On 23 October 2022, Woo announced her engagement to Bryan Tan, a senior regional director of business development and events at PCCW Media Group under Viu (Southeast Asia), as well as her pregnancy. Their marriage was registered on 27 December 2022. She gave birth to Jan Tan, a daughter, on 20 January 2023.

Tan was named 'Jan' after her month of birth, January and has a nickname of the "Fried Egg" deriving from the Chinese slang (煎蛋) of her English name that gives the meaning of a fried egg.

== Filmography ==
=== Television series ===
Year	Title	Role	Notes	Ref.
2012	Jump!	Liu Haiyen		
2013	Code Of Law	Lydia		
2013	Sudden	Liao Qiqi	Cameo	
2013	The Dream Makers	Rain Pei Xiaoqing		
2013	96°C Café	Luo Wenjie		
2013	C.L.I.F. 2	Liao Zhenting		
2014	The School Bell Rings 2	Joyce Sim		
2014	Against The Tide	Huang Liqi	Cameo	
2014	C.L.I.F. 3	Liao Zhenting		
2014	The Caregivers	Yang Haomin		
2015	The Journey: Our Homeland	Wan Yiting	Cameo	
2015	Super Senior	Chen Anxin		
2015	Tiger Mum	Abigail		
2015	You Can Be an Angel Too	Dai Xiwen		
2016	Hero	Bonnie		
2016	Soul Reaper (勾魂使者)	He Yuna		
2016	Peace & Prosperity	Yang Meikai		
2016	Beyond Words	Ouyang Xuanxuan		
2016	The Queen	Wu Kai'en		
2017	Have A Little Faith	Qian Leqi		
2017	Dream Coder	Li Huixin		
2018	Glitch!	Chloe Ling		
2018	Love At Cavenagh Bridge (加文纳桥的约定)	Xiao Mi		
2018	Life Less Ordinary	Liang Wenjie		
2019	After The Star (攻星计)	Young Zhang Lan	Cameo	
2019	Jalan Jalan (带你去走走)	Zhang Weina		
2021	The Heartland Hero	Lin Nannian		

=== Telemovie ===
Year	Title	Role	Notes	Ref.
2013	The Recipe (回味)			
2013	Art of Love			
2013	Easy Breezy			
2014	Unexpected Strangers (小心陌生人)	Li Luoling		
2014	Who Killed The Lead (侦凶)	Coco Xu		

=== Film ===
Year	Title	Role	Notes	Ref.
2013	Ghost Child	Kim		
2013	That Girl in Pinafore	Jayley		
2015	King of Mahjong			
2019	So Bright 2 (写给梦想的歌)	Yao Ziqi		

== Awards and nominations ==
Year	Ceremony	Category	Nominated work	Result	Ref.
2013	Star Awards	Best Newcomer	Jump! (as Liu Haiyan)	Nominated	
2014	Star Awards	Asian Skin Solutions Radiant Skin Award	—N/a	Nominated	
2015	Star Awards	Top 10 Most Popular Female Artistes	—N/a	Nominated	
2016	Star Awards	Top 10 Most Popular Female Artistes	—N/a	Won	
2017	Star Awards	Top 10 Most Popular Female Artistes	—N/a	Won	
2019	Star Awards	Top 10 Most Popular Female Artistes	—N/a	Nominated	
2021	Star Awards	Top 10 Most Popular Female Artistes	—N/a	Nominated	
