= The Journey: Our Homeland =

- Also known as: Our Homeland; The Journey Part 3 我们的家园
- 信约：我们的家园
- Genre: Period drama
- Written by: Seah Choon Guan 谢俊源; Chen Sew Khoon 陈秀群
- Directed by: Loo Yin Kam 卢燕金; Doreen Yap 叶佩娟; Christina Koh 高秀慧 霍志楷
- Starring: Rui En; Shane Pow; Ian Fang; Julie Tan; Rebecca Lim; Romeo Tan; Zhang Zhenhuan; Jeffrey Xu
- Opening theme: 梦里家园 by Olivia Ong
- Ending theme: 之间 by Shin
- Country of origin: Singapore
- Original language: Chinese
- No. of episodes: 30 (list of episodes)

Production
- Executive producer: Wong Kuang Yong 黄光荣
- Running time: approx. 45 minutes (exc. advertisements)

Original release
- Network: Mediacorp Channel 8
- Release: 16 July – 26 August 2015

Related
- The Journey: A Voyage (2013); The Journey: Tumultuous Times (2014)

The Journey: Our Homeland (Chinese: 信约：我们的家园, also known as Our Homeland) is the third and final season of Mediacorp Channel 8's nation-building trilogy The Journey, the previous two being The Journey: A Voyage and The Journey: Tumultuous Times. Production began in January 2015 and debut on 16 July 2015 with a total of 30 episodes. It stars third generation casts, Rui En, Shane Pow, Julie Tan, Ian Fang, Rebecca Lim, Romeo Tan, Jeffrey Xu and Zhang Zhenhuan as the main cast of the third instalment.

== Cast ==
=== Main cast ===
- Rui En as Yang Meixue 杨美雪
- Shaun Chen as Zhang Jia 张佳
- Felicia Chin as Zhang Min 张敏
- Rebecca Lim as Wan Feifei 万菲菲: A factory seamstress who, in order to pay her mother's medical bill, becomes a bar hostess. She is also one of the victims who were trapped during the Collapse of Hotel New World.
  - Venus Lim as young Wan Feifei
- Romeo Tan as Hong Kuan 洪宽
  - Ian Teng as younger Hong Kuan
- Zhang Zhenhuan as Yan Yisheng 严义生
- Andie Chen as Hong Dangyong 洪当勇
- Jeffrey Xu as Hong Rui 洪锐
  - Alston Yeo as younger Hong Rui
- Aloysius Pang as Hong Guo'an 洪国安
- Nick Teo as Hong Guoshun 洪国顺
- Jeanette Aw as Hong Minghui 洪明慧
- Renfred Ng 黄业伦 as Zhang Junteng 张骏腾
- Aileen Tan as Yang Lihua 杨丽华
- Chen Guohua as Wan Shan 万山
- Chen Huihui 陈慧慧 as Bai Jin Nu 白金女
- Shane Pow as Wan Zihua 万子华
  - Andres Neo Bo Jun as younger Wan Zihua
- Ian Fang as Wan Zicong 万子聪
- Cheryl Wee as 黄馨慧 as Wan Fangfang 万芳芳
- Jayley Woo as Wan Yiting 万怡婷
- Li Wenhai as Yan Songtao 严松涛
- Lin Meijiao as Su Qiufeng 苏秋凤
- James Seah 谢宏辉 as Yan Yimin 严义民
- Darren Lim as Dai Xiaoxiong 戴晓雄
- Li Yuejie 李岳杰 as Ah Niu/Spareribs 阿牛
- Laura Kee 纪丽晶 as Ah Niu's wife 阿牛嫂
- Marcus Mok 莫健发 as Yao Renyi 姚仁艺
- Tracer Wong 王裕香 as Liwan 丽婉
- Julie Tan as Yao Jiahui 姚嘉慧

=== Others ===
- Zhang Xinxiang as Jingui 金贵
- Jae Liew 柳胜美 as Liu Daidi 刘带娣
- Joey Feng 冯瑾瑜 as Liu Qing 柳青
- Rashidal Binti Enee as Fatimah 花蒂玛
- Darius Tan 陈日成 as Ah Xiao 阿笑
- Vincent Tee 池素宝 as Bao Dating 包打听
- Darryl Yong as Peishuang
- 林伟德 as Zhiqiang 志强
- Dennis George Heath as Mr. Robertson
- Karen Jean Stott as Mrs. Robertson
- 黄毅新 as Blockhead 阿呆
- Romeo Tan as Zhang Yan 张晏
- Kelly Lim LT 林俐廷 as Mei-jie 妹姐
- Drake Lim 林文强 as Secretary Liang 梁秘书
- Ye Shipin 叶世品 as Richard
- 柯迪宏 as Ah Shun 阿顺
- 周全喜 as Uncle Hai 海叔
- Ho Ai Ling 何爱玲 as Xiuxiu 秀秀
- 谭丽芳 as Yuejiao 月娇
- 杨迪嘉 as Li Yuluan 李玉鸾
- Leron Heng 王丽蓉 as Meiyun 美云
- Cansen Goh 吴开深 as Chen Ze 陈泽
- Shirley Teo 张思丽 as Mimi 咪咪
- 李世雄 as Tanaka 田中
- Henry Heng 王利秦 as Bernard
- 郑开怀 as Ah Ming 阿明
- Kanny Theng as Xiaohong 小红
- Kelvin Soon 孙文海 as Albert
- 王瑞显 as Sam
- Jim Koh 许晋鸣 as Ah Quan 阿泉
- 郑逸钦 as Uncle Huang 黄柏
- 邱雁玲 as Sharon
- 颜孝玄 as Mr. Thomas

== Trivia ==
- The store that the Hong family opened was a reference to The Little Nyonya.

== Release ==
Malaysia's satellite channel Astro Shuang Xing was to air the show first in Asia, beginning from 9 July 2015, Sundays to Thursdays, as with Mind Game (aired on 30 April) and Super Senior (11 June). However, on the discretion of MediaCorp, Shuang Xing has to air the show on the same day as Singapore from 23 July 2015, Mondays to Fridays. Hence, the show was pre-empted five times there. This caused Taiwan SET's Be With You 2 episodes back-to-back telecast to be pushed forward to 5.00pm from 16 to 23 July. In fact, Astro shouldn't have aired MediaCorp dramas first before Singapore does so beginning with Mind Game, as it did not perform well in Singapore and is also nominated for only one technical award in Star Awards 2016, and that only Super Senior and The Dream Makers II were the only dramas in the planned First Global Premiere to win performance categories. The changes in schedule partially influenced Shuang Xing's timeslots of series airing later — following the end of Hong Kong's HKTV global premiere, with effect from 24 September, the channel resumed airing dramas on Mondays to Fridays, and back-to-back encores on Saturdays and Sundays, with the first series to use the new timeslots being Chinese series Best Get Going and MediaCorp's Hand In Hand. Other dramas, such as Youth Power, K Song Lover and My Husband is a Cartoonist, changed their schedules as well, with the exception of same-day telecast as Taiwan series Love Cuisine.

The series repeat its telecast on Channel 8 from 4:30pm to 6:30pm on weekends succeeding The Journey: Tumultuous Times.

== Other media ==
This series was adapted as a comic and has been selling at Popular Bookstores since November 2015, targeting at upper primary and secondary students. The comic showcases the best of the series, and is promoted by the committee to Promote Chinese Language.

== Soundtrack ==
Song title	Song type	Performer	Lyricist(s)	Composer(s)	Song Arranger(s)	Producer(s)
梦里家园 (Our Homeland)	Theme Song	Olivia Ong （王俪婷）				
之间	Sub Theme Song	Shin （蘇見信）				

== Accolades ==
Our Homeland has the next-to-most number of nominations for Star Awards 2016, with 16 nominations - 7 technical, 7 performance and 2 voting-based - in 14 award categories, down from 17 in 2015. The series has at least one nomination in every technical award for drama programmes, winning the Best Cameraman (for Drama Programmes) award. It won one award out of 14 awards.

Jeanette Aw won six voting-based awards in Star Awards 2015 Show 1, including three Most Popular Regional Artiste Awards, Social Media Award and Favourite Female Character award for her role in The Journey: Tumultuous Times. Aw expressed her wish to withdraw from voting-based award categories in the future. Speaking to the media after the ceremony, Aw said that the move is due to her concern about rabid fans who left messages online saying that they would harm themselves if she did not win enough awards. However, it can be seen that voting for Star Awards 2016 Favourite Female Character for both this series and The Dream Makers II did not remove her from the voting list. Mediacorp quotes that as these awards are determined by online voting, she still had to participate in these awards. She went on to win the Favourite Female Character and Favourite Onscreen Couple (Drama) with Qi Yuwu for The Dream Makers II in 2016, which was the last time the Favourite categories were held.

Organisation	Year	Category	Nominees	Result	Ref
Star Awards	2016	Best Director	Loo Yin Kam	Nominated	
Star Awards	2016	Best Director	Doreen Yap Pei Kiang	Nominated	
Star Awards	2016	Best Screenplay	Seah Choon Guan; Chen Sew Khoon	Nominated	
Star Awards	2016	Best Programme Promo	Chen Pei Chun	Nominated	
Star Awards	2016	Best Cameraman (for Drama Programmes)	Steve Wong Kwok Chung	Won	
Star Awards	2016	Best Set Design for Drama Programme	Chen Jiagu; Oh Hock Leong	Nominated	
Star Awards	2016	Best Editing for Drama Programme	Lai Chun Kwang	Nominated	
Star Awards	2016	Best Evergreen Artiste Award	Lin Meijiao	Nominated	
Star Awards	2016	Young Talent Award	Ian Teng	Nominated	
Star Awards	2016	Young Talent Award	Ezekiel Chee	Nominated	
Star Awards	2016	Best Theme Song	Olivia Ong	Nominated	
Star Awards	2016	Best Supporting Actor	Andie Chen	Nominated	
Star Awards	2016	Best Actor	Shaun Chen	Nominated	
Star Awards	2016	Best Drama Serial	—N/a	Nominated	
Star Awards	2016	Favourite Male Character	Romeo Tan	Nominated	
Star Awards	2016	Favourite Onscreen Couple (Drama)	Shaun Chen / Rui En	Nominated	
Fame Awards	2016	Best Actor in a Supporting Role	Andie Chen	Nominated	
Fame Awards	2016	Best Actor in a Supporting Role	Ian Fang	Nominated	
Fame Awards	2016	Best Actor in a Supporting Role	Shane Pow	Nominated	
Fame Awards	2016	Best Actress in a Supporting Role	Aileen Tan	Nominated	
Fame Awards	2016	Best Actress in a Supporting Role	Lin Meijiao	Nominated	
Asian Television Awards	2016	Best Drama Serial	—N/a	Nominated	
