= Star Awards 2016 =

Singaporean television awards

Star Awards 2016 红星大奖2016
- Date: 17 April 2016 - Show 1; 24 April 2016 - Show 2
- Site: The Theatre @ Mediacorp, Singapore
- Presented by: London Choco Roll; Bioskin
- Sponsors: Simmons; Kinohimitsu (Award Sponsor); Mercedes-Benz (Car Sponsor); LG; Chan Brothers Travel; Seng Choon Eggs
- Hosted by: Christina Lim (Backstage); Dennis Chew; Lee Teng; Pornsak; Desmond Ng (Prelude); Shane Pow (Prelude)

Highlights
- Most awards: Drama: The Dream Makers (season 2) (12); Variety/Info-ed: GeTai Challenge (3)
- Most nominations: Drama: The Dream Makers (season 2) (26); Variety/Info-ed: GeTai Challenge (5)
- Best Drama: The Dream Makers (season 2)
- Best Variety Show: GeTai Challenge
- All-time Favourite Artiste: Qi Yuwu; Rui En
- Website: Official website

Television/radio coverage
- Network: Mediacorp Channel 8; Mediacorp Channel U; Toggle
- Runtime: 180 mins (both presentations); 60 mins (Walk of Fame and Post-show); 15 mins (Prelude); with 2+ mins commercial each

Star Awards 2016 (also SA2016, Chinese: 红星大奖2016) is a double television award ceremony which is held in Singapore. It is part of the annual Star Awards organised by Mediacorp for free-to-air channels Channels 8 and U.

This was the first Star Awards ceremony to be held on the new campus at Stars Avenue after its relocation happened in December 2015; for the first time since 2009, the technical awards were not broadcast on television.

The nominations were announced were announced on 1 February 2016 and the Most Favorite Artistes on 3 March 2016 at Mandarin Orchard Singapore, with the results announced during the ceremonies on 17 and 24 April 2016; for the first time in the ceremony's history, both shows placed emphasis for variety and drama programs, and the Top 10 Most Favorite Artists were separately awarded, respectively.

The first season of GeTai Challenge won three awards in the Info-ed category, including the Variety Program and Variety Special, and becoming the first show other than Star Awards to win the Variety Special for the first time since 2010. In drama category, the second season of The Dream Makers broke several records during the ceremony by winning an unprecedented 12 awards out of 26 nominations (including nominations of all but two awards), and become the second drama series to sweep all five major acting categories after Holland V in 2003.

== Programme details ==
Date	Shows	Time	Channels
1 April 2016 to 22 April 2016	Star Awards 2016 Prelude	10.30 pm to 10.45 pm	Mediacorp Channel 8
17 April 2016	Star Awards 2016 Walk of Fame	5.30 pm to 6.30 pm	Mediacorp Channel 8 (Singapore); Mediacorp Channel U (Singapore); Astro Xi Yue HD (Malaysia); Toggle
17 April 2016	Star Awards 2016 Show 1	7pm to 10 pm	Mediacorp Channel 8 (Singapore); Mediacorp Channel U (Singapore); Astro Xi Yue HD (Malaysia); Toggle
24 April 2016	Star Awards 2016 Show 2	7pm to 10 pm	Mediacorp Channel 8 (Singapore); Mediacorp Channel U (Singapore); Astro Xi Yue HD (Malaysia); Toggle
24 April 2016	Star Awards 2016 Post Show Party	10.30 pm to 11.30 pm	Mediacorp Channel 8 Toggle

== Backstage achievement awards ==
These technical awards were presented in Mandarin Orchard Singapore on 21 March 2016, and snippets of it were shown on the third episode of the prelude on 15 April 2016.

Winners are listed first, highlighted in boldface.

**Best Director**: **Loh Woon Woon – The Dream Makers (season 2)**; Ng Lai Huat – Mind Game; Wong Foong Hwee – The Dream Makers (season 2); Loo Yin Kam – The Journey: Our Homeland; Doreen Yap Pei Kiang – The Journey: Our Homeland	**Best Screenplay**: **Ang Eng Tee – Tiger Mum**; Lau Ching Poon – You Can Be an Angel Too; Rebecca Leow – The Dream Makers (season 2); Lim Gim Lan and Goh Chwee Chwee – Super Senior; Seah Choon Guan and Chen Sew Khoon – The Journey: Our Homeland
**Best Variety Producer**: **Kang Lay See – Love on the Plate 3**; Gan Bee Khim – GeTai Challenge; Khow Hwai Teng – SPD Charity Show 2015; Jean Toh – Star Awards 2015 Show 2; Alfred Yeo – The Successor	**Best Variety Research Writer**: **Lin Shih Han – The Joy Truck 3 快**; Rachel Han Xinru – GeTai Challenge; Sheffie Liang – Going Home 3; Ng Jin Puay – The Games We Played; Evelyn Gow – The Successor
**Best Programme Promo**: **Fiona Lin – Let It Go**; Chia Jia Xin – Hand in Hand; Chen Pei Chun – The Journey: Our Homeland; Kee Chee Wee – The Dream Makers (season 2); Delon Poh – Crescendo	**Best Cameraman (for Drama Programmes)**: **Steve Wong Kwok Chung – The Journey: Our Homeland**; Ang Soon Bee – Love?; Tommy Lee Heng Soon – The Dream Makers (season 2); Lim Hap Choon – Life Is Beautiful; Toh Meng Teck – Hand in Hand
**Best Set Design for Drama Programme**: **Ho Hock Choon – 118**; Chen Jiagu and Oh Hock Leong – The Journey: Our Homeland; Delon Low – Hand in Hand; Oh Hock Leong – A Blessed Life; Wong Lab Seng – You Can Be an Angel Too	**Best Editing for Drama Programme**: **Simon Poon – The Dream Makers (season 2)**; Lai Chun Kwang – The Journey: Our Homeland; Steven Lee – The Dream Makers (season 2); Koh Kah Yen – Hand in Hand; Joyce Teo – The Dream Makers (season 2)
**Best News Story**: **Lip Kwok Wai – LKY Public Mourners form Long Queue on Day 1**; Chng Kheng Leng – Sengkang Temple site to build columbarium incites angers of residents-to-be; Loi Kar Yee – Punggol Waterway Terraces BTO pipes burst and flooded; Ng Lian Cheong – Asia-Euro Holidays close down without warning; Seet Sok Hwee – Jurong Lift Accident An 85-year-old woman's hand was severed
**Best Current Affairs Story**: **Yap Li Ling, Cheng Tee Yin, Raymond Foong and Desmond Lim (producers); Ang Ka Swan (editor); Wee Wai Lin (executive producer) – Frontline – The Singapore Spirit**; Chew Wen Jing and Cheng Tee Yin (producers); Ang Ka Swan (editor); Wee Wai Lin (executive producer) – Frontline – The Extreme Challenge; E.g. Yik Fan (producer); Yong Yih Min (executive producer) – Money Week – Fluctuations in the stock market are unprofitable?; Goh Chye Kim, Jiao Yihui, Pang Pau Xian and Seoow Juin Yee (producers); Pang Kia Nian (editor) – Focus – Paris Attack; Grace Yang, Goh Chye Kim, Jiao Yihui and Chan Wai Hoe (producers); Christopher Yeo (executive producer) – Focus – 70th Anniversary of WW II: Honour the sacrifices, Remember the Past

== Show 1 ==
The nominees and representative titles are listed in alphabetical name order, unless otherwise stated. Winners are listed first, highlighted in boldface.

**Best Variety Programme**: **GeTai Challenge**; Body SOS 4; The Games We Played; Little Shops; Love on The Plate 3	**Best Variety Special**: **GeTai Challenge: The Ultimate Battle**; SPD Charity Show 2015; Star Awards 2015 Show 1; Star Awards 2015 Show 2; Thye Hua Kwan Charity Show 2015
**Best Info-Ed Programme**: **Tuesday Report: Where The Home Is**; Face Off!; Homeward Bound; Life Extraordinaire; Tuesday Report: Lifeline	**Best Programme Host (Variety, Info-Ed & Infotainment)**: **Lee Teng – Love on The Plate 3**; Guo Liang – What Your School Doesn't Teach You; Kate Pang – Face Off; Pornsak – GeTai Challenge; Quan Yi Fong – Celeb's Curated Collections
**Best Evergreen Artiste Award**: **Chen Shucheng – Super Senior as Chen Yalai 陈亚来**; Chen Tianwen – 118 as Zhang Tiancheng 张天成; Hong Huifang – Good Luck as Lin-He Xiangniang 林何香娘; Lin Meijiao – The Journey: Our Homeland as Su Qiufeng 苏秋凤; Xiang Yun – Super Senior as Yu Fang 于芳

=== Special awards ===
**Rocket Award**	**Julie Tan**
**Social Media Award**	**Carrie Wong**

=== All-Time Favourite Artiste awards ===
This award is a special achievement award given out to artiste(s) who have achieved a maximum of 10 popularity awards over 10 years. Top 10 winning years the recipients were awarded together are highlighted in boldface.

**All Time Favourite Artiste**	**Qi Yuwu**	2004 | **2005** | **2006** | **2007** | **2009** | **2010** | **2011** | **2012** | **2014** | **2015**
**All Time Favourite Artiste**	**Rui En**	**2005** | **2006** | **2007** | **2009** | **2010** | **2011** | **2012** | 2013 | **2014** | **2015**

==== Top 10 Most Popular Female Artistes ====
The Top 10 Most Popular Female Artistes are decided by telepoll and online voting, which carries a 50% weightage of the combined total score each. The telepoll lines were announced on 3 March 2015 in a press conference at Mandarin Orchard Singapore, along with the Top 10 Most Popular Male Artistes. Voting for the Female Artistes opened from 4 March, and ended at 8:30 pm on 17 April.

Top 10 Most Popular Female Artistes
  - **Julie Tan**
  - **Jesseca Liu**
  - **Rebecca Lim**
  - **Rebecca Lim**
  - **Belinde Lee**
  - **Jayley Woo**
  - **Felicia Chin**
  - **Quan Yi Fong**
  - **Joanne Peh**
  - **Kym Ng**
    - Pan Lingling
    - Hong Huifang
    - Paige Chua
    - Youyi
    - Sheila Sim
    - Jin Yinji
    - Aileen Tan
    - Tong Bing Yu
    - Kate Pang
    - Ya Hui

== Show 2 ==
The nominees and representative titles are listed in alphabetical name order, unless otherwise stated. Winners are listed first, highlighted in boldface.

**Best Drama Serial**: **The Dream Makers (season 2)**; 118; Crescendo; The Journey: Our Homeland; Tiger Mum	**Best Theme Song**: **Kit Chan – The Dream Makers (season 2) - (《终于》)**; A-do – Crescendo - (《好想告诉你》); Bonnie Loo – Tiger Mum - (《未知数》); Olivia Ong – The Journey: Our Homeland - (《梦里家园》); Jack Neo – 118 - (《够力够力》)
**Best Actor**: **Qi Yuwu – The Dream Makers (season 2) as Jason Lam**; Chen Hanwei – 118 as Li Weiliang; Shaun Chen – The Journey: Our Homeland as Zhang Jia 张佳; Christopher Lee ^{1} – Crescendo as Yang Yiwei 杨毅伟; Romeo Tan – The Dream Makers (season 2)as Zhong Yiming 钟一鸣	**Best Actress**: **Jeanette Aw – The Dream Makers (season 2) as Zhao Fei Er 赵非儿**; Rebecca Lim – Sealed with a Kiss as Du Junning 杜均宁; Rui En – The Dream Makers (season 2) as Fang Tonglin 方彤琳; Zoe Tay – The Dream Makers (season 2) as Zhou Weiyun 周薇芸; Ya Hui – 118 as Hong Jinzhi 洪金枝
**Best Supporting Actor**: **Zhang Zhenhuan – The Dream Makers (season 2) as Chen Guang 陈光**; Andie Chen – The Journey: Our Homeland as Hong Dangyong 洪当勇; Chen Tianwen – 118 as Zhang Tiancheng 张天成; Ian Fang – Tiger Mum as Chen Haowei 陈浩威; Edwin Goh – The Dream Makers (season 2) as Eddy	**Best Supporting Actress**: **Julie Tan – The Dream Makers (season 2) as Dong Zihuai 董子怀**; Paige Chua – Good Luck as Fang Enqi 方恩琦; Bonnie Loo – Tiger Mum as Chen Huiyan 陈慧妍; Sheila Sim – 118 as Hong Shanshan 洪姗姗; Carrie Wong – 118 as Zhang Ke Ai 张可爱
**Young Talent Award**: **Damien Teo – The Dream Makers (season 2) as Eden**; Ezekiel Chee – The Journey: Our Homeland as younger Wan Zicong 小子聪; Ivan Lo – A Blessed Life as Ting Feng 庭风; Sun Yi En – 118 as Viveka; Ian Teng 丁翊 – The Journey: Our Homeland as younger Hong Kuan 小洪宽

^1A representative collected the award in place of the nominee.

=== Special awards ===
**Top Rated Drama Serial**	**Tiger Mum**
**Top Rated Variety Programme**	**GeTai Challenge**

==== Top 10 Most Popular Male Artistes ====
Like the Top 10 Most Popular Female Artistes, the Top 10 Most Popular Male Artistes are decided by telepoll and online voting. Voting for the Male Artistes opened from 4 March, and ended at 8:30 pm on 24 April.

Top 10 Most Popular Male Artistes
  - **Xu Bin**
  - **Zhang Yaodong**
  - **Elvin Ng**
  - **Lee Teng**
  - **Zheng Geping**
  - **Zhang Zhenhuan**
  - **Aloysius Pang**
  - **Dennis Chew**
  - **Jeffrey Xu**
  - **Shane Pow**
    - Pierre Png
    - Guo Liang
    - Chen Shucheng
    - Shaun Chen
    - Thomas Ong
    - Pornsak
    - Romeo Tan
    - Chua En Lai
    - Chen Tianwen
    - Zhu Houren

== Post show party ==
Longest Running Docu-drama Series: Crimewatch	i-Weekly Most Stylish Award: Male: Elvin Ng; Female: Rui En	YES 933 FM Best Speech Award: Elvin Ng

Favourite Male Character: Xu Bin – You Can Be an Angel Too as Fu Jiaren 傅家任; Christopher Lee - Crescendo as Yang Yiwei 杨毅伟; Aloysius Pang – Hand in Hand as Ang Bee Ghee 洪美志; Romeo Tan – The Journey: Our Homeland as Zhang Yan 张晏 / Hong Kuan 洪宽; Zhang Zhenhuan – Sealed with a Kiss as Zheng Danle 郑丹乐	Favourite Female Character: Jeanette Aw – The Dream Makers (season 2) as Zhao Fei Er 赵非儿; Hong Ling – 118 as Wang Yuye 王玉叶; Rui En – The Dream Makers (season 2) as Fang Tonglin 方彤琳; Huang Biren - The Dream Makers (season 2) as Guan Xie En 官谢恩; Xiang Yun – Super Senior as Yu Fang 于芳
Favourite Onscreen Couple: Qi Yuwu and Jeanette Aw – The Dream Makers (season 2) as Jason Lam and Zhao Fei Er 赵非儿; Tay Ping Hui and Ann Kok – Crescendo as Jiang Chufan 江楚帆 and Deng Xueli 邓雪莉; Qi Yuwu and Rui En – The Dream Makers (season 2) as Jason Lam and Fang Tonglin 方彤琳; Zhang Zhenhuan and Julie Tan – The Dream Makers (season 2) as Chen Guang 陈光 and Dong Zihuai 董子怀; Shaun Chen and Rui En – The Journey: Our Homeland as Zhang Jia 张佳 and Yang Meixue 杨美雪	Bioskin Flawless Skin Award: Ya Hui; Felicia Chin; Julie Tan; Pan Lingling; Paige Chua
London Choco Roll Happiness Award London Choco Roll: Romeo Tan – The Dream Makers (season 2) as Zhong Yiming 钟一鸣; Ian Fang – Tiger Mum as Chen Haowei 陈浩威; Desmond Tan – Second Chance as Li Dashan 李大山; Aloysius Pang – Good Luck as Lin Jiayuan 林家元; Xu Bin – You Can Be an Angel Too as Fu Jiaren 傅家任	Toggle Most Beloved Celebrity BFF Award: Dennis Chew and Rui En; Aloysius Pang and Xu Bin; Chen Hanwei and Zoe Tay; Ian Fang and Jeffrey Xu; Kate Pang and Vivian Lai

== Summary of nominations and awards (by programme genre) ==
=== Most nominations ===
Programs that received multiple nominations are listed below, by number of nominations per work:

Dramas that received multiple nominations
Nominations	Drama
26	The Dream Makers (season 2)
16	The Journey: Our Homeland
11	118
6	Crescendo
6	Tiger Mum
5	Hand in Hand
4	Super Senior
4	You Can Be an Angel Too
3	Good Luck
2	A Blessed Life
2	Sealed with a Kiss

Variety/Info-ed that received multiple nominations
Nominations	Variety/Info-ed
5	GeTai Challenge
3	Love on the Plate 3 名厨出走记3
3	Star Awards 2015
2	Face Off! 这样是怎样?
2	Focus 焦点
2	Frontline 前线追踪
2	SPD Charity Show 2015 真情无障爱
2	The Games We Played 那些年，我们一起玩的游戏
2	The Successor 锁住味道
2	Tuesday Report 星期二特写

=== Most wins ===
Dramas that received multiple awards
Wins	Drama
12	The Dream Makers (season 2)
2	Tiger Mum

Variety/Info-ed that received multiple awards
Wins	Variety/Info-ed
3	GeTai Challenge
2	Love on the Plate 3 名厨出走记3

== Presenters and performers ==
The following individuals presented awards or performed musical numbers.

=== Show 1 ===
==== Presenters ====
Name(s)	Role
Wang Deming 王德明	Announcer for Star Awards 2016
Mediacorp Artistes 新传媒艺人	Cast entrance on stage (in order of appearance): Evergreen Artistes; Chen Shucheng, Hong Huifang, Xiang Yun, Lin Meijiao, Chen Tianwen; Top 20 Female Artistes; Belinda Lee, Kym Ng, Quan Yi Fong, Kate Pang; Sheila Sim, Paige Chua, Chris Tong, Youyi; Pan Lingling, Jin Yinji, Aileen Tan; Ya Hui, Julie Tan, Carrie Wong, Jayley Woo; Jesseca Liu, Rebecca Lim, Joanne Peh, Felicia Chin; Top 20 Male Artistes; Pierre Png, Shaun Chen, Thomas Ong; Guo Liang, Zhang Yaodong, Zheng Geping, Zhu Houren; Jeffrey Xu, Aloysius Pang, Shane Pow, Chua En Lai; Zhang Zhenhuan, Elvin Ng, Romeo Tan, Xu Bin; All-Time Favourite Artiste; Qi Yuwu, Rui En; Bryan Wong, Vivian Lai, Mark Lee; Chen Hanwei, Jeanette Aw, Tay Pinghui; Huang Biren, Zoe Tay, Xiang Yun, Chen Liping
Liang Wern Fook	Presenter of the award for Best Info-Ed Programme
Mediacorp chairman Teo Ming Kian 张铭坚	Presenter of the award for Rocket Award
Lawrence Cheng William Shen 沈玉琳	Presenters of the awards for Best Variety Programme and Best Variety Special
Kit Chan	Presenter of the award for Social Media Award
Teo Chee Hean Deputy Prime Minister and Co-ordinating Minister for National Security	Gave out the award for Best Evergreen Artiste
Liang Wern Fook; Kit Chan	Presenters of the award for All-Time Favourite Artiste
Hu Gua 胡瓜	Presenter of the award for Best Programme Host (Variety, Info-Ed & Infotainment)
Hu Gua 胡瓜 Park Hae-jin	Presenters of the award for Top 10 Most Popular Female Artistes

==== Performers ====
Name(s)	Role	Performed
Jeffrey Li 李成宇	Performer	Performed "The Greatest Love of All"
Kit Chan	Performer	Performed "终于" from The Dream Makers (season 2) 志在四方II
The Teng Ensemble	Orchestral	Performed "小白船"
Blue Man Group	Performers	Drum performance
Vivian Lai; Lee Teng; Quan Yi Fong; Mark Lee; Dennis Chew; Jeremy Chan; Chua En Lai	Skit performers	Skit performers of 《主持人不好当》
Jeannie Hsieh	Performer	Performed 《姐姐》 and 《蹦蹦趴》

=== Show 2 ===
==== Presenters ====
Name(s)	Role
Wang Deming 王德明	Announcer for Star Awards 2016
Huang Hongmo 黄宏墨; Li Feihui	Presenter of the award for Best Theme Song
Shaun Seow 萧文光 Mediacorp CEO	Gave out the award for Top Rated Drama Serial
Chee Hong Tat Minister of State, Ministry of Communications and Information & Ministry of Health	Gave out the award for Top Rated Variety Programme
Fung Bo Bo	Presenter of the award for Young Talent Award
Eric Huang 黄少祺; Angus Hsieh 谢承均	Presenters of the awards for Best Supporting Actor and Best Supporting Actress
Anthony Wong	Presenter of the award for Best Drama Serial
Sonia Sui	Presenter of the award for Best Actor
Myolie Wu	Presenter of the award for Best Actress
JJ Lin; Kym Ng; Quan Yi Fong	Presenters of the award for Top 10 Most Popular Male Artistes

==== Performers ====
Name(s)	Role	Performed
Vocaluptuous	Performers	Performed "终于" from The Dream Makers (season 2); Performed "够力够力" from 118; Performed "好想告诉你" from Crescendo; Performed "梦里家园" from The Journey: Our Homeland; Performed "未知数" from Tiger Mum
Elecoldxhot	Performers	Dance performance
Dance Thrilogy	Performers	Dance to 《小苹果》
Daly Tang 邓男子	Magician	Magic tricks with Dennis Chew, Lee Teng and Carrie Wong
JJ Lin	Performer	Performed "她说", "会有那么一天", "只对你说", "记得" and "不为谁而作的歌"

==== Video snippets ====
In commemoration of the first Star Awards ceremony held in the new MediaCorp campus, nomination videos shown for show 2 begin with a short 15-second snippet of a performer playing an instrument which was shot either at the Gardens by the Bay (first five listed) or at the new MediaCorp campus.

Name(s)	Instrument	Associated Award For	Featured Quote (Translation)
Li Wei Ting 李炜婷; Lin Wang Chun 林泓椿	Flute	Best Theme Song	"正声雅音 笔下生花" (A Positive Sound Penned by a Good Musician)
Seah Xi Qing 谢喜晴; Lou Linhh 陈嘉灵	Saxophone	Young Talent Award	"含苞吐萼 初露锋芒" (The First Sign that shows a Bud in a Flower)
Yvonne Tay 郑怡雯 from Ding Yi Music Company	Guzheng	Best Supporting Actress	"牡丹绿叶 初露锋芒" (The Peony Green Leaves made its First Appearance)
Tan Qing Lun 陈庆伦 from Singapore Chinese Music Federation	Dizi	Best Supporting Actor	"锦花修草 蓄势待发" (Reaping for a Thought, Be Ready for Action)
Toh Kai Xiang 卓开祥 from Ding Yi Music Company	Hand Drum	Best Drama Serial	"春风杨柳 风行水上" (A Spring Breeze Willows Across the Water)
Loon Shi Zong 伦显宗	Trumpet	Best Actor	"划破天际 不同凡响" (An Extraordinary One that Cuts through the Sky)
Flame of the Forest	Tabla, Musical Keyboard and Sitar	Best Actress	"棋逢对手 惺惺相惜" (A Freemasonry Rivalry)

== Ceremony Information ==
=== Awards categories ===
- This is the first ceremony to introduce three awards, "Best Programme Host", "Best Evergreen Artiste" and the voting category "Bioskin Flawless Skin Award". The Best Programme Host was a combination of both Best Variety Show Host and Best Info-Ed Programme Host awards as both categories have a similar presentation structure.
- This is the first year all five nominations for the Best Drama Serial have the same nominations for the Best Theme Song. Coincidentally, the winning Drama Serial The Dream Makers (season 2) also won the Best Theme Song.
- This was the final ceremony until 2022 where the online Favourite award categories were held.
  - Jeanette Aw was nominated again for Favourite Female Character and Favourite Onscreen Couple (Drama). Initially, Aw stated that she expressed her intention to remove her name from the nominations due to her winning six voting-based awards (which include Most Popular Regional Artiste Awards, Social Media Award and Favourite Female Character award for her role in The Journey: Tumultuous Times), but Mediacorp declined her request as the awards were determined though online voting, and still requiring her to participate.
- This was the first (and to date, currently the only) ceremony in which the awards for the Top 10 Artistes were presented in separate shows instead of single show, with the female artistes awarded in show 1, and the male artistes on show 2.
  - It was also the first (and to date the only) ceremony the main awards were split into two shows, each focusing on Variety/Info-ed and Drama, respectively.
  - Due to none of the artiste won their ninth Top 10 Popular Artiste title at the time after the ceremony, 2018 was thus became the third ceremony, after 2007 and 2013, to not present the All-Time Favourite Artiste since its category inception in 2004.

=== Nomination firsts ===
- First-time nominees included Bonnie Loo, Edwin Goh, Ian Fang, Romeo Tan, Sheila Sim, Jeffrey Xu and Ya Hui for the Top 10 awards.
- Aileen Tan, Chen Tianwen, Jesseca Liu, Pan Lingling, Kate Pang, Zhang Yaodong and Zhang Zhenhuan were nominated for the Top 10 awards after not nominated for the category last year.
  - Chen Tianwen was nominated for the Top 10 Most Popular Male Artiste award for the first time since 2002, marking the longest absence by any returning artiste so far at 13 years.
- Liu was nominated for the Top 10 Most Popular Male Artiste award for the first time since 2010. Between 2010 and 2015, she left Mediacorp to join HIM International Music due to the contract expiry, but later returned to Mediacorp last year after she recently signed a new acting contract.

=== Consecutive and records in award categories, first in Top 10 ===
- The Dream Makers (season 2) set numerous records during the night's ceremony:
  - The series set the largest count of nominations for a ceremony in a single year with 26, surpassing the first series's 21 from the 2014 ceremony.
  - The series also set a record on winning the most awards for a ceremony in a single year with 12, surpassing both the first series and The Little Nyonya, both with nine wins.
  - The series became the first drama to win every awards they were nominated for, except for Favorite Male Artiste (which was not nominated) and Top Rated Drama Series (all the dramas were eligible).
  - The series became the ninth drama to have its series nominated for the Best Drama Serial multiple times, and the first (and to date, the only) drama to win in this category twice.
  - The series became the second drama to earn the distinction in which the drama won all five major acting categories (which were Best Drama Serial, Best Actor and Actress, and Best Supporting Actor and Actress), with the first being 2003's drama Holland V.
- Jayley Woo, Aloysius Pang and Jeffrey Xu won the Top 10 awards for the first time, alongside Jesseca Liu, Dennis Chew, Zhang Yaodong, Zhang Zhenhuan and Zheng Geping, who neither were nominated nor won last year.
- Elvin Ng became the eighth All-Time Favourite Artiste to win the award with ten consecutive Top 10 Male Favourite Artiste wins. Ng, along with Joanne Peh and Quan Yi Fong, were conferred the said award in the following year's ceremony.
- For the first time since 2010, Star Awards ended a five-consecutive winning streak for the Best Variety Special category, losing to the first season of GeTai Challenge.

=== Other trivia ===
- Despite being the two-part program, this was the first ceremony since 2009 the Backstage Awards were presented outside the award ceremony. This was also the last ceremony to host a two-part ceremony since its format was revamped in 2010.
- The Best Newcomer award was also suspended due to the lack of candidates, but it will return again in the 2018 ceremony, two years later.

== Accolades ==
Year	Ceremony	Category	Nominee(s)	Result	Ref
2017	Star Awards	Best Variety Special	Walk-of-fame segment	Nominated	
2017	Star Awards	Best Variety Special	Star Awards 2016 (Show 1)	Nominated	
2017	Star Awards	Best Variety Special	Star Awards 2016 (Show 2)	Won	

== See also ==
- List of programmes broadcast by MediaCorp Channel 8
- Mediacorp Channel 8
