= Aloysius Pang =

Singaporean actor (1990–2019)

- Born: Aloysius Pang Wei Chong; 24 August 1990; Singapore
- Died: 24 January 2019 (aged 28); Hamilton, New Zealand
- Burial place: Ashes scattered into the sea near Pulau Ubin, Singapore
- Education: Singapore Institute of Management University
- Occupations: Actor; singer; director; screenwriter
- Years active: 1999–2004; 2012–2019
- Musical career
- Formerly of: 8 Dukes of Caldecott Hill

Stage name
- Traditional Chinese: 馮偉衷
- Simplified Chinese: 冯伟衷
- Hanyu Pinyin: Féng Wěizhōng

Birth name
- Traditional Chinese: 馮偉忠
- Simplified Chinese: 冯伟忠
- Hanyu Pinyin: Féng Wěizhōng

Aloysius Pang Wei Chong (24 August 1990 – 24 January 2019) was a Singaporean actor once managed under NoonTalk Media, best known for his involvement in multiple Mediacorp dramas.

Pang died on 24 January 2019 at 1:45am NZDT (23 January 2019 at 8:45pm SST) due to serious crush injuries sustained from a military accident while on Operationally Ready National Service reservist training in the Singapore Army, aged 28.

== Early life ==
Pang was born in Singapore on 24 August 1990. He had two elder brothers, Jefferson and Kenny. Pang studied in Pei Chun Public School and Yuying Secondary School. In 2012, he graduated from Singapore Institute of Management University with a diploma in management studies.

== Career ==
Pang started acting at the age of nine after he joined an acting class organised by Mediacorp, and starred in children dramas such as My Teacher, My Buddy (1999), Bukit Ho Swee (2002), The Adventures of BBT (2002), A Child's Hope (Season 1, 2003; Season 2, 2004), and I Love My Home (2004). Growing up with the Chinese name of 冯伟忠, Pang later changed the last character of his Chinese name from 忠 to 衷 to reference the old shows he did as a child actor, while retaining its pronunciation. He was nominated for his role as Ding Wei Liang in A Child's Hope in Star Awards 2003 Young Talent Award in Star Awards 2003. He left acting in 2004 after being repeatedly bullied; in a 2015 interview he said he'd "told [Mediacorp] to take my file out and never call [him] again".

In 2012, Pang made his comeback in the lead role of the film Timeless Love, which was directed by Lim Koong Hwee and Singaporean celebrity Dasmond Koh. Pang made his directorial debut in 2014 by directing the music video of Singapore-based singer Gavin Teo's I Understand (我懂了), which also starred Xu Bin and Kimberly Chia.

In 2014, he was named one of the 8 Dukes of Caldecott Hill and went on to win the Best Newcomer at the Star Awards 2015. Pang released his first single "Black Tears" (黑色眼泪) in 2015. It was also announced that Pang would star in Singapore's first cosplay-themed movie, Young & Fabulous. Together with Xu Bin, he also took part in an online variety show produced by NoonTalk Media, called Freshmen (来吧！上课啦！).

From Star Awards 2013 to Star Awards 2016, he was nominated for Favourite Male Character. In Star Awards 2015, he was awarded the Best Newcomer and was nominated for Best Supporting Actor & Rocket. In Star Awards 2016, he won his first award for Top 10 Most Popular Male Artistes.

Pang was known for setting aside 10 percent of his pay to thank and bless the production people on set.

On 7 April 2017, in an interview with Mediacorp's Toggle, Pang said that he would not renew his contract with Mediacorp in order to focus on a business he had set up with his brother. The company was named Kairos Green and focused on wood plastic composite.

In 2018, he acted in a Toggle romance-mystery series From Beijing to Moscow where he made a two-month road trip to China, Mongolia and Russia with Felicia Chin, River Huang and Jojo Goh. It premiered on Toggle in June 2019.

Pang was to start shooting in February 2019 and take on his first lead role in the Channel 8 romantic comedy drama My One In a Million, alongside his long-time onscreen partner Carrie Wong before his death. His role was given to Beijing-based local actor Lawrence Wong.

In May 2022, three years after Pang died, it was announced that a Singapore–Thailand film, The Antique Shop, which features scenes of Pang, which were filmed prior to his death, would be released in Thailand on 2 June. This would be his final posthumous work.

== Personal life ==
Pang was in a unpublicized relationship with actress Jayley Woo which first started from 2017. Shortly after his death, Woo revealed that they'd only planned to go public after the wedding. She did not elaborate on the reason for keeping the relationship secret, but Pang's manager Dasmond Koh is known to have imposed a no-dating rule on his stable of artistes.

== Death ==
On 19 January 2019, while taking part in a live-firing exercise at Waiouru Training Area in New Zealand as an Operationally Ready National Serviceman, Pang entered the cabin of a Singapore Self-Propelled Howitzer (SSPH) to troubleshoot a fault. At 7:05 pm NZDT (2:05 pm SST), to enable diagnosis of the fault, the barrel of the howitzer was automatically lowered to neutral position within the cabin. Pang was in the path of the receding barrel and sustained severe crush injuries to his chest and abdomen as a result.

Pang was evacuated by helicopter to the Waiouru Camp Medical Centre and then to Waikato Hospital, where he had abdominal surgery. Despite further surgery and initially being conscious, his condition later deteriorated and he was placed on life support for his heart, lungs and kidneys. He died at the hospital on 24 January 2019 at 1:45 am NZDT (23 January 2019 8:45 pm SST). According to New Zealand laws, before the body could be repatriated back to Singapore, a post-mortem was to be performed with permission from the family, but it did not proceed as Pang's family did not grant it.

Pang's body was repatriated the following day. A wake began on the morning of 26 January 2019. Initially limited to family and relatives, it was opened to the public from 26 January 2019, 12pm till 27 January 2019, 12pm. Thousands came and paid their respects, including close friends, media artistes, politicians and fans. Pang was accorded a military funeral later on 27 January 2019 and his casket was moved to the Mandai Crematorium. He was cremated in the evening. His ashes were scattered into the sea off the island of Pulau Ubin the following day. Pang is survived by his parents and two brothers.

=== Impact and aftermath ===
Pang was the first soldier to be injured due to gun lowering while operating the SSPH as claimed by the Ministry of Defence (MINDEF) in a media release clarifying the safety record of the artillery vehicle. His death sparked renewed concerns about the accountability for and safety of military training, and prompted other national servicemen to share their experiences in the military online. After Pang's death, MINDEF called for a safety timeout for the Army and halted all training, including strenuous physical exercise, such as jogging, route marches and the Individual Physical Proficiency Test, pending safety reviews.

On 25 January 2019, MINDEF set up a Committee of Inquiry (COI) to investigate the death of Pang. He was also posthumously promoted to the rank of Corporal first class, the highest enlistee rank within the Singapore Armed Forces.

On 1 February 2019, MINDEF announced that the SAF would be setting up a new Inspector-General Office (IGO), which directly reports to the Chief of Defence Force, and absorbing the existing Safety and Systems Review Directorate (SSRD) in the process. It would have full authority to scrutinise and enforce safety processes and practices at all levels. Existing responsibilities of the SSRD include convening external review panels and conduct external benchmarking of safety practices and standards, reviewing safety-related reports including those of the Committees of Inquiry, and reviewing specific MINDEF/SAF systems as required. On 27 February, Brigadier General Tan Chee Wee assumed the Office while simultaneously appointed to be the Chief of Staff, Joint Staff of SAF.

On 6 May 2019, the findings from the COI were presented in the Singapore Parliament by Defence Minister Ng Eng Hen. It was found that the primary issue was that the gun barrel was lowered without ensuring that everyone was in a safe position. There was no evidence indicating foul play or deliberate acts found. At the time of accident, Pang was together with a NSMan gun commander, 3SG(NS) Hubert Wah, aged 31 and a Military Expert technician, ME2 Ivan Teo, aged 35. Pang did not move away from the gun barrel as required in the operating procedures, claiming that he would not be hit. Both Wah and Teo miscalculated the space in the cabin and the time needed for the barrel to be lowered, and Wah, proceeded to lower the gun barrel. After the gun barrel has been lowered for a time, Pang began to move away, however it was too late and was caught between the end of the barrel and the top of the cabin above him. Both Wah and Teo tried to stop the barrel from lowering through the main control screen and manually resisting the motion of the barrel, instead of activating the emergency stop buttons located at their respective positions in the howitzer. The COI stated the safety lapses were preventable if the standard operating procedures were followed. The External Review Panel on SAF Safety has also recommended to SAF to do more to improve on the 'weak' safety culture.

On 31 July 2019, Teo and Wah were charged under the Singapore Armed Forces Act and the Penal Code in a military court for causing death under rash and/or negligent acts and for disobeying military general orders. On 19 November 2019, they pleaded guilty and were sentenced on the same day with Wah and Teo fined $8,000 and $7,000 respectively. Should the fine not be paid, Wah and Teo would be detained for 40 days and 35 days respectively. Wah would also be demoted from the rank of Third Sergeant to Corporal. The Pang family had requested a lenient sentence, saying that "One loss is enough. Other parents' sons have a life ahead of them."

==== Tributes ====
A video tribute to Pang was aired on Channel 8 on 31 January 2019. On 14 April 2019, a special memoriam was given during the 2019 Star Awards ceremony, where performers Xu Bin, Timothee Yap, Zong Zijie and Gavin Teo performed the song Voices From My Heart 小人物的心声 while montages of Pang were shown.

== Discography ==
=== Singles ===
Year	Song title	Notes	Ref.
2015	Black Tears (黑色眼泪)		

=== Drama soundtrack ===
Year	Drama title	Song title	Notes	Ref.
2015	Life - Fear Not	一样	Sub-theme	

=== Compilation albums ===
Year	English title	Mandarin title	Ref.
2015	Mediacorp Music Lunar New Year Album 15	新传媒群星金羊添吉祥	
2016	Mediacorp Music Lunar New Year Album 16	新传媒群星金猴添喜庆	

== Filmography ==
=== Film ===
Year	Title	Role	Notes	Ref.
2012	Timeless Love	Morgan		
2013	Everybody's Business	Meng		
2016	Young & Fabulous	Royston Chio		
2022	The Antique Shop	Ryan	Posthumous role	

=== Television series ===
Year	Title	Role	Notes	Ref.
1999	My Teacher, My Buddy	Pang Dayu		
2001	In Pursuit of Peace	Ah Dai		
2002	The Adventures of BBT	Superglue		
2002	Bukit Ho Swee	Ah Cai		
2003	A Child's Hope	Ding Weiliang		
2004	I Love My Home	Xu Lizhong		
2004	A Child's Hope 2	Tang Yongjun		
2012	It Takes Two	Hao Zhijie		
2012	Poetic Justice	Derek		
2013	I'm in Charge	Wang Jiahao		
2013	C.L.I.F. 2	Jiang Yongzhe		
2013	It's a Wonderful Life	Young Hao Huihuang		
2014	Mystic Whispers	Zhiguang		
2014	Against The Tide	Zhao Keji		
2014	World at Your Feet	Fang Yangming		
2014	Served H.O.T.	He Tailong		
2015	Hand In Hand	Hong Meizhi		
2015	The Journey: Our Homeland	Hong Guo'an		
2015	118	Himself		
2015	Super Senior	Dong Haoyuan		
2015	Tiger Mum	Chen Haolian		
2015	Love?	Aloysius		
2015	Good Luck	Lin Jiayuan		
2015	You Can Be an Angel Too	Li Longhua		
2016	You Can Be an Angel 2	Li Longhua		
2016	The Gentlemen	Zhang Naiyi		
2016	The Truth Seekers	Jiang Xiaodong		
2016	My First School	Li Yonghui		
2016	Life - Fear Not	Zhuang Daoren		
2017	My Friends from Afar	Chen Xianglin		
2017	My Alien Girlfriend	Chen Xianglin		
2017	Dream Coder	He Jianming 何建明		
2018	Follow Your Heart	—N/a		
2018	29 February	Ye Zhixin		
2018	Love At Cavenagh Bridge	Jackie		
2018	Ghost AR	Shawn Koh Yizheng		
2019	From Beijing to Moscow	Kenneth	Posthumous release	
2020	Victory Lap	—N/a	Drama credited to him	

=== Telemovie ===
Year	Title	Role	Notes	Ref.
2015	Two Boys and a Mermaid	Aaron		

== Awards and nominations ==
Year	Ceremony	Category	Nominated work	Result	Ref.
2003	Star Awards	Young Talent Award	A Child's Hope (as Ding Weiliang)	Nominated	
2013	Star Awards	Favourite Male Character	It Takes Two (as Hao Zhijie)	Nominated	
2014	Star Awards	Favourite Male Character	I'm In Charge (as Wang Jiahao)	Nominated	
2015	Star Awards	Star Awards for Most Popular Regional Artiste (Indonesia)	—N/a	Nominated	
2015	Star Awards	Favourite Male Character	World at Your Feet (as Fang Yangming)	Nominated	
2015	Star Awards	Best Supporting Actor	Against The Tide (as Zhao Keji)	Nominated	
2015	Star Awards	Rocket Award	Against The Tide (as Zhao Keji)	Nominated	
2015	Star Awards	Best Newcomer	—N/a	Won	
2015	Star Awards	Toggle Outstanding Duke Award	—N/a	Nominated	
2016	Star Awards	Top 10 Most Popular Male Artistes	—N/a	Won	
2016	Star Awards	Favourite Male Character	Hand In Hand (as Hong Meizhi)	Nominated	
2016	Star Awards	Toggle Most Beloved Celebrity BFF award (With Xu Bin)	—N/a	Nominated	
2018	Star Awards	Top 10 Most Popular Male Artistes	—N/a	Nominated	
