= Jeffrey Xu =

Chinese actor (born 1988)

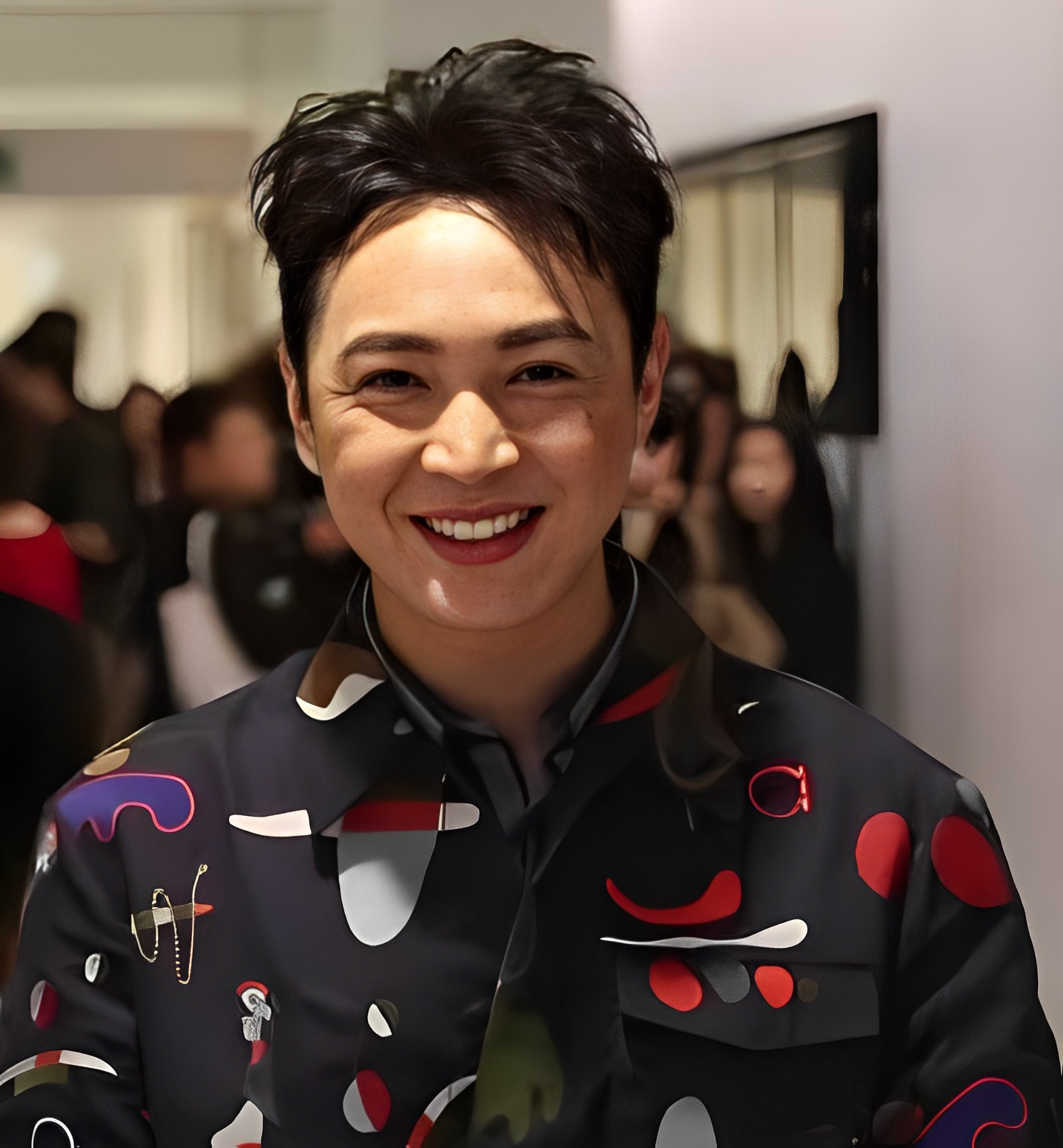
- Xu at the Star Awards 2017
- Born: 3 October 1988 (age 37); Shanghai, China
- Occupations: Actor; host
- Years active: 2011−present
- Agent: The Celebrity Agency
- Spouse: Felicia Chin (m. 2022)
- Awards: Full list

Chinese name
- Traditional Chinese: 徐鳴傑
- Simplified Chinese: 徐鸣杰
- Hanyu Pinyin: Xú Míngjié

Jeffrey Xu Mingjie (born 3 October 1988) is a Chinese actor and host based in Singapore.

== Career ==
Xu studied performing major at Shanghai Film Art Academy before being discovered through the tenth season of Star Search in 2010, in which he emerged winner.

He made his first drama appearance in Devotion, in which he played an autistic child, which gave him a nomination for Best Newcomer during the Star Awards 2012.

In Star Awards 2013 and Star Awards 2017, Jeffrey gained a nomination for Star Awards for Best Supporting Actor for respective dramas.

In 2013, Jeffrey clinched the "Best Actor in a Supporting Role" award at the 18th Asian Television Awards (ATA) for his role in Marry Me.

In 2015, Xu is involved in more dramas like Crescendo, Sealed with a Kiss, The Journey: Our Homeland, Tiger Mum and Life Is Beautiful has wrapped up a long form drama, Life - Fear Not.

In Star Awards 2016, Xu gained his first award called Top 10 Most Popular Male Artistes.

In 2017, Xu has been involved in a few dramas which are Have a Little Faith & Mightiest Mother-in-Law. He has wrapped up a long form drama, Life Less Ordinary with Chen Liping and Xiang Yun, which was first broadcast on October 2, 2017. In 2018, Xu have been involved in 2 Toggle series drama called Love at Cavenagh Bridge & Blue Tick.

Xu has won the Top 10 Most Popular Male Artistes award in 2016.

In December 2020, Xu, along with other Mediacorp artistes, were under investigation by MND for alleged breach of COVID-19 measures at Xu's birthday celebration.

In Star Awards 2022, Xu won the award for Best Supporting Actor for his role as Lin Jinxiong in The Takedown.

In Star Awards 2023, Xu won the Most Hated Villain award in the MYPICK! awards category for his role in Dark Angels as Gu Wangming but did not win the Top 10 Most Popular Male Artistes award.

== Personal life ==
On 22 October 2022, Xu married former Mediacorp artiste, Felicia Chin. They had been dating since 2015.

== Filmography ==
=== Film ===
Year	Title	Role	Notes	Ref.
2016	Young & Fabulous	Chen Jun		
2018	Republic of Food	Zhang Yimao		
2024	Fat Hope			

=== Television series ===
Year	Title	Role	Notes	Ref.
2011	Let's Play Love	Nicholas		
2011	Devotion	Zheng Yimin		
2011	Bountiful Blessings	Huang Fuyuan		
2012	Poetic Justice	Paul		
2013	Marry Me (我要嫁出去)	Dave Xu		
2013	The Recruit Diaries (阿兵新传)	Chen Jiexi		
2013	Gonna Make It	Ah Hui		
2014	Scrum! (冲锋)	Xiao Yizhan		
2014	Three Wishes	Volunteer Lin		
2015	Life Is Beautiful	Lin Zhongken		
2015	Tiger Mum	Zhang Guoqiang		
2015	The Journey: Our Homeland	Hong Rui		
2015	Sealed with a Kiss	Xu Zhicheng		
2015	Crescendo	Xu Wenjie		
2015	Life - Fear Not	Try Toh		
2016	Don't Worry, Be Healthy	Handsome Guy		
2016	The Queen	Liu Zhenyang		
2016	Peace & Prosperity	Lu Xiaoqiang		
2016	The Dream Job	He Jiazheng		
2017	Mightiest Mother-in-Law	Chen Jian		
2017	Have A Little Faith	Zhou Jiannan		
2017	Life Less Ordinary	Xu Tao		
2018	Love at Cavenagh Bridge (加文纳桥的约定)	Zhu Jiangchun		
2018	Blue Tick (已读不回)	Zhou Daowen		
2018	Magic Chef (料理人生)	Zhang Youming		
2019	Playground (游乐场)	Guo Nanyou		
2019	My One In A Million (我的万里挑一)	Kent Ye Jianxian		
2019	I'm Madam (我是女官)	Hulk Tan		
2020	A Quest to Heal	Duke Gong		
2020	The Little Nyonya	Huang Tianbao	2020 remake of The Little Nonya	
2021	My Mini-Me & Me (很久以后的未来)	Wu Shixiong		
2021	Watch Out ! Alexius (小心啊！谢宇航)	Chen Junfeng		
2021	A Whole World Difference (都市狂想)	Piggy		
2021	The Heartland Hero	Lin Shuhao		
2021	The Takedown (肃战肃绝)	Lin Jinxiong		
2022	Sisters Stand Tall (快跑吧，丽娇)	Shen Jianming		
2022	Healing Hands (医生不是神)	Addy King		
2022	Dark Angel (黑天使)	Gu Wangming		
2023	Strike Gold	Jarrell Ke Nan		
2023	Family Ties	Chen Zhengguo		
2023	My One and Only	Bowen		

=== TV hosting ===
Year	Title	Notes	Ref.
2011	我的小小发明		
2012	Super IQ IQ超人		
2012	Body SOS 小毛病大问题	Resident host	
2012	Style Check-in 潮人攻略		
2012	Japan Eats 日本美食通		
2012	Weekend Getaway 周末自由行		
2013	Style: Check-In 2! 潮人攻略2		
2013	Heritage Hunters 知新小玩家		
2013	Style: Check-In 3! 潮人攻略3		
2014	Shoot It 2 哪里出问题2		
2014	Body SOS 3 小毛病大问题3	Resident guest	
2014	Love Travels		
2014	Property SOS 3 小房子大投资	Resident guest	

== Discography ==
=== Compilation albums ===
Year	English title	Mandarin title
2015	MediaCorp Music Lunar New Year Album 15	新传媒群星金羊添吉祥
2016	MediaCorp Music Lunar New Year Album 16	新传媒群星金猴添喜庆

== Awards and nominations ==
Year	Ceremony	Category	Nominated work	Result	Ref
2012	Star Awards	Best Newcomer	Devotion (as Zheng Yimin)	Nominated	
2013	Asian Television Awards	Best Actor in a Supporting Role	Marry Me (as Xu Xiaodong Dave)	Won	
2014	Asian Television Awards	Best Actor in a Supporting Role	Gonna Make It (as Ah Hui)	Nominated	
2014	Asian Television Awards	Best Actor in a Supporting Role	Scrum! (as Xiao Yi Zhan)	Nominated	
2014	Star Awards	Best Supporting Actor	Marry Me (as Xu Xiaodong Dave)	Nominated	
2015	Star Awards	Toggle Outstanding Duke Award	—	Nominated	
2016	Star Awards	Toggle Most Beloved Celebrity BFF Award (with Ian Fang)	—	Nominated	
2016	Star Awards	Top 10 Most Popular Male Artistes	—	Won	
2017	Star Awards	Best Supporting Actor	Peace & Prosperity (as Lu Xiaoqiang)	Nominated	
2017	Star Awards	Top 10 Most Popular Male Artistes	—	Nominated	
2018	Star Awards	Bioskin Most Charismatic Artiste Award	—	Nominated	
2018	Star Awards	Best Theme Song	Life Less Ordinary	Nominated	
2021	Star Awards	Top 10 Most Popular Male Artistes	—	Nominated	
2022	Star Awards	Best Supporting Actor	The Takedown (as Lin Jinxiong)	Won	
2022	Star Awards	Most Hated Villain	The Takedown (as Lin Jinxiong)	Nominated	
2022	Asian Television Awards	Best Actor in a Supporting Role	The Takedown (as Lin Jinxiong)	Won	
2023	Star Awards	Most Hated Villain	Dark Angels (as Gu Wangming)	Won	
2023	Star Awards	Top 10 Most Popular Male Artistes	—	Nominated	
2023	ContentAsia Awards	Best Supporting Actor in a TV Programme/Series Made in Asia	Strike Gold (as Ke Nan)	Nominated	
2024	Star Awards	Most Hated Villain	Strike Gold (as Ke Nan)	Nominated	
2024	Star Awards	Top 10 Most Popular Male Artistes	—	Nominated	
