= Hand in Hand (Singaporean TV series) =

- 手牵手
- Genre: Family; Comedy; Action
- Written by: Phang Kai Yee 彭凯毅 许丽雯
- Directed by: Png Keh Hock 方家福; Oh Liang Cai 胡凉财
- Starring: Bryan Wong; Jesseca Liu; Seraph Sun; Aloysius Pang
- Opening theme: Hand In Hand (手牵手) by Bryan Wong, Jesseca Liu, Seraph Sun and Aloysius Pang
- Ending theme: Wants to be with you (只想和你在一起) by Le Sheng 乐声
- Country of origin: Singapore
- Original language: Chinese
- No. of episodes: 20 (list of episodes)

Production
- Executive producer: Leong Lye Lin 梁来玲
- Production locations: Singapore; Pulau Ubin, Singapore; Pengerang, Malaysia; Batam, Indonesia
- Running time: approx. 45 minutes (exc. advertisements)

Original release
- Network: MediaCorp Channel 8
- Release: 25 September – 22 October 2015

Related
- Sealed with a Kiss; Crescendo

Hand In Hand (Chinese: 手牵手) is a Singaporean drama produced and telecast on MediaCorp Channel 8. The drama began production in April 2015 and began airing from 25 September 2015. The show aired at 9pm on weekdays and had a repeat telecast at 8am the following day. The series stars Bryan Wong, Jesseca Liu, Seraph Sun and Aloysius Pang and is partly sponsored by the Media Development Authority of Singapore.

== Cast ==
=== Main cast ===
- Bryan Wong as Hong Meiqiang 洪美强
  - 陈毅丰 as youth Hong Meiqiang 洪美强
- Jesseca Liu as Hong Meifang 洪美芳
  - 张淑婷 as youth Hong Meifang 洪美芳

Cast	Character	Description
Seraph Sun 孙欣佩	Hong Meiting 洪美婷	Villain But Repented; Businesswoman; Hong Jincai and Wang Shuhua's younger daughter Hong Meiqiang and Hong Meifang's younger sister Hong Meizhi's second sister Hong Yi'en's biological mother Discovered to be pregnant during Meiqiang's jail term, after sleeping with another man who left Singapore; Attempted to steal Yi'en from Meifang and even accusing Meifang of child abuse to get Yi'en back Realized her mistake at #18; Younger version portrayed by 孙艺恩
Aloysius Pang 冯伟衷	Hong Meizhi 洪美志	Dopey (小呆); Hong Jincai and Wang Shuhua's younger son Hong Meiqiang, Hong Meifang and Hong Meiting's youngest brother Aloysius Pang's apparent doppelganger Addicted to online gambling after hacking an online casino belonging to Chen Haonan in #11 - #13; In love with Yao Xiaobing; Yao Xiaobing's boyfriend in the end Younger version portrayed by 李佐仁

=== Supporting cast ===
Cast	Character	Description
Lin Meijiao 林梅娇	Wang Shuhua 王淑桦	Hong Jincai's wife Hong Meiqiang, Hong Meifang, Hong Meiting and Hong Meizhi's mother Hong Yi'en's grandmother Died from brain hemorrhage (Deceased - #01)
Ben Yeo 杨志龙	Zhong Renyi 钟仁义	Main Villain; Hong Meiqiang's buddy but betrayed him in later parts of the show Hong Meifang's best friend He Xinying's schoolmate A selfish and timid person who could do anything for himself and money Likes Hong Meifang but manipulated her for money Hong Meifang's love interest Killed Ah Dong and is responsible for the imprisonment of Hong Meiqiang; Admitted he killed Ah Dong in #19 and went into hiding Gave himself in to the police to save Meifang in #20 (Arrested - #20); Younger version portrayed by Justin Peng (彭修轩)
Kaidon 李晋延	Hong Yi'en 洪以恩	Hong Meiqiang, Hong Meifang and Hong Meizhi's nephew Hong Meifang's foster son Hong Meiting and Zhang Jinshu's biological son
Sora Ma 马艺瑄	He Xinying 何心莹	Lawyer and freelance artist Love triangle with Hong Meiqiang and Chen Haonan; Zhong Renyi's schoolmate Married Chen Haonan in #11; Daughter of Ah Dong; Let fate decide her ultimate choice through means of a coin in #20, leaving the result in a cliffhanger Hong Meiqiang's girlfriend in the end Younger version portrayed by Alicia Lo (卢予萱)
Zheng Geping 郑各评	Chen Haonan 陈浩男	Main Villain; CEO of a loanshark syndicate Boss of an online casino company Love triangle with He Xinying and Hong Meiqiang; Married He Xinying in #11; Hong Meiqiang's rival in love Involved in the murder of Ah Dong; Xinying will decide her ultimate choice (between him and Meiqiang) in #20
Hong Huifang 洪慧芳	He Liyun 何丽云	He Xinying's mother Suffers from leukemia Died during Xinying and Haonan's marriage (Deceased - #11)
Bryan Wong 王禄江	Hong Jincai 洪进财	Wang Shuhua's husband Hong Meiqiang, Hong Meifang, Hong Meiting and Hong Meizhi's father Missing for 20 years Involved in a kidnap case in broad daylight Fled to Batam after the kidnap Died in a foreign land due to a disease (Deceased - 15 years ago)
Brandon Wong 黄炯耀	Bai Guang 白光	Xiao-long (小龙), Bruce Lee (李小龙); Hong Jincai and Chen Heping's friend Suffers from dementia Lives in Pengerang, Malaysia; Involved in a kidnap case in broad daylight
Boon Ang 洪伟文	Chen Heping 陈和平	Hong Jincai and Bai Guang's friend Involved in a kidnap case in broad daylight Yao Xiaobing's husband Detests Hong Meizhi; Died after Xiaoshan (Madam Lee) sent men to kill him at their meeting place, getting Meiqiang and Meizhi arrested (Deceased - #20)
Candyce Toh 杜蕙甹	Yao Xiaobing 姚小冰	Hong Meizhi's love interest Chen Heping's wife Hong Meizhi's girlfriend in #20
Tan Hui Hui 陈慧慧	Madam Lee (Zheng Xiaoshan 郑小珊)	Involved in the kidnap case Caused the deaths of her own son and Chen Heping; Changed her name and looks after leaving Singapore, and married a rich man Agreed Xinying, Meifang and Meiting to save Meiqiang and Meizhi in #20, but wants them to keep the secret to themselves and pretend that Xiaoshan died 20 years ago Zheng Xiaoshan version portrayed by Cat Ang

=== Cameo appearances ===
Cast	Character	Description
何培斌	Ah Yuan 阿袁	A fellow bookie of Meiqiang
Yeo Thiam Hock 杨添福	Ah Dong 阿东	Darned Botak (死Botak); Original name Liu Bao Dong (刘保东); Hong Meiqiang's previous enemy He Xinying's long lost biological father, enemy and apparent mistress Killed in the warehouse by Zhong Renyi after he knocked Hong Meiqiang down (Deceased - 7 years ago)
Chua Cheng Pou 蔡清炮	Big Head 大头	Ah Dong's lackey, later Meiqiang's buddy
张华珉	Uncle Wonton 云吞叔	Wonton shophouse owner
陈瑞民	Doctor 医生	Doctor at the hospital
陈志强	Ah Wang 阿旺	He Xinying's blind date arranged by Liyun
郑逸钦	Uncle Kopi 咖啡叔	Coffee shop owner
符和增	Zi char boss 煮炒老板	Boss of the zi char shop Hong Jincai patronizes
Melody Low	Ah Lian 阿莲	Zhong Renyi's friend
韩淑分	Physiotherapist 物理治疗师	Physiotherapist who gave an artificial leg to Hong Meifang
Andi Lim 林伟文	Hong Yuancai 洪元财	Hong Jincai's cousin who looks similar to Jincai
Remus Teng 丁森炎	Pedophile 变态男	A pedophile who tried to attack He Xinying
Haden Hee 许立楷	Paul	Hong Meifang's blind date arranged by Zhong Renyi, who poses as a tuition teacher
Zhu Xiufeng	Ping-jie 平姐	Sister Heping (和平姐姐); Chen Heping's elder sister
Zhang Wei 张为	Mr. Foo	Old Uncle (老Uncle); Hong Meiting's client who loves children
林洁琳	Female assistant 女助手	Female assistant at the hospital
尤雅敏	Aunt 阿嫂	
马天凌	Venerable 高人	The venerable who Big Head and Meiqiang went to seek
陶樱	Bai Guang's wife 白光嫂	Bai Guang's wife Lives in Pengerang, Malaysia
杨昌心	Xiao-kang 小康	
欧宗强	Haonan's subordinate A 浩男手下A	Chen Haonan's lackey
叶进华	Witness-of-marriage 证婚人	The witness-of-marriage between Chen Haonan and He Xinying
Michelle Tay 郑荔分	Ah Jiao 阿娇	Ah Dong's wife, later Big Head's wife
Edgar Hong 符芳锦	Haonan's subordinate B 浩男手下B	Chen Haonan's lackey
纙翎財	Uncle Chen 陈老板	

== Production ==
- This is Bryan Wong's most challenging series to date, as he has to run half-naked along the Marina Bay area (#18), and dangle from a multi-storey car park roof (#01). In the series, Zheng Geping and Ben Yeo will also have topless scenes as well.
- While Hong Meizhi is tracking Meiting in episodes 8 and 15, a passer-by claims he is Star Awards 2015 Best Newcomer Aloysius Pang, the actor who portrayed him.

== Accolades ==
Hand In Hand is nominated for five award categories in Star Awards 2016, four of which are technical awards and the other is a voting-based award.

Year	Ceremony	Category	Nominee(s)	Result
2016	Star Awards	Best Programme Promo 最佳宣传短片	Chia Jia Xin 谢家芯	Nominated
2016	Star Awards	Best Cameraman (for Drama Programmes) 最佳戏剧摄影	Toh Meng Teck 卓明德	Nominated
2016	Star Awards	Best Set Design for Drama Programme 最佳戏剧布景设计	Low Delon 刘迪伦	Nominated
2016	Star Awards	Best Editing for Drama Programme 最佳戏剧剪接	Koh Kah Yen 许家燕	Nominated
2016	Star Awards	Favourite Male Character	Aloysius Pang	Nominated

== See also ==
- List of MediaCorp Channel 8 Chinese drama series (2010s)
