= Tiger Mum =

- 虎妈来了
- Genre: Drama; Family
- Written by: Ang Eng Tee
- Directed by: Png Keh Hock; Oh Liang Cai
- Starring: Huang Biren; Yao Wenlong; Julie Tan; Ian Fang; Bonnie Loo; Aloysius Pang; Jeffrey Xu
- Opening theme: 未知数 by Bonnie Loo
- Country of origin: Singapore
- Original languages: Mandarin, with some English dialogue
- No. of episodes: 20 (list of episodes)

Production
- Producer: Jasmine Woo
- Running time: approx. 45 minutes

Original release
- Network: Mediacorp Channel 8
- Release: 9 April – 6 May 2015

Related
- Hero (2016)

Tiger Mum (Chinese: 虎妈来了) is a Singaporean family drama produced and telecast on MediaCorp Channel 8. The drama began production in November 2014. The series ran from 9 April to 6 May 2015. It stars Yao Wenlong, Huang Biren, Julie Tan, Ian Fang, Bonnie Loo, Aloysius Pang and Jeffrey Xu. This is the second drama appearance of veteran actress Huang Biren since her return to the entertainment industry after a seven-year hiatus. Huang plays the title character in the show. a controlling and demanding tiger mother character. The series is sponsored by the Media Development Authority of Singapore.

With the show's viewership constantly breaking the 1 million mark, and its finale attracting more than 1.06 million viewers, Tiger Mum has been named the Top Rated Drama of Year 2015 at the recently held Star Awards 2016. This is the second consecutive time a drama starring Huang Biren (after Three Wishes in 2014) has managed to take the top viewership spot.

== Cast ==
=== Main cast ===
- Huang Biren as He Xuemei 贺雪美, a senior prison officer
- Yao Wenlong as Chen Kai 陈凯, 'Your Home Living' owner
- Julie Tan as Chen Huixin 陈慧欣Chen Haowei Chen Haolian's and Chen Huiyan elder sister Chen Kai's eldest daughter
- Shannen Tan as Younger 陈慧欣Chen Huixin a Student

| Cast | Role | Description | Episodes appeared |
|---|---|---|---|
| Ian Fang 方伟杰 | Chen Haowei (陈浩威) | Works at Ivan's office Chen Kai's eldest son Chen Huixin's younger brother Chen Haolian and Chen Huiyan's elder brother Likes Wang Rouya but gave her up and fell in love with Zoe in episode 20 | 1-20 |
| Aloysius Pang 冯伟衷 | Chen Haolian (陈浩廉) | Secondary School Student; Chen Kai's youngest son Chen Huixin and Chen Haowei's youngest brother Chen Huiyan's elder brother Abigail's ex-classmate and boyfriend | 1-20 |
| Bonnie Loo 罗美仪 | Chen Huiyan（陈慧妍） | Secondary School Student; Chen Kai's youngest daughter Chen Huixin, Chen Haowei and Chen Haolian's youngest sister Nat Tan's girlfriend but was dumped in episode 11; Angel Lim's schoolmate, bully and rival in love but eventually became good friends with her | 1-20 |

=== Supporting cast ===
| Cast | Role | Description | Episodes appeared |
|---|---|---|---|
| Jeffrey Xu 徐鸣杰 | Zhang Guoqiang 张国强 | Prisoner 6412; Chef; Accepted by a university Likes He Xuemei ends up in love with Chen Huixin in episode 20 | 1, 3-20 |
| Jayley Woo 胡佳琪 | Abigail | Former Prostitute; Liu Jinmai's daughter Chen Haolian's ex-classmate and girlfriend Darren's sister | 1, 3, 6, 9, 11, 12, 14, 20 |
| Rayson Tan 陈泰铭 | Ivan Eng | Villain; Chen Haowei's boss Chased Chen Haowei out in episode 18 but was stopped by Mr Sim. | 1- |
| Brandon Wong 黄炯耀 | Robert Leow | Chen Kai's colleague; 'Your Home Living' second owner | 3- |
| Belinda Lee 李心钰 | Mo Xiaoling 莫晓玲 | Chen Kai's sister-in-law Margaret's mother | 12-20 |
| Tuen Wai Meng | Liu Jinmai 刘金迈 | Prisoner 0368; Abigail's father Repeat offender | 1, 3, 9, 20 |
| Jaspers Lai 赖宇涵 | Peter | Villain; Prisoner 5566 | 1-2, 14-15, 20 |
| Jae Liew 柳胜美 | Wang Rouya 王柔雅 | Chen Haowei's colleague and love interest | 2- |
| Lina Ng 黄嫊方 | He Shengmei 贺胜美 | He Xuemei's younger sister Benjamin and Cecilia's mother | 2-5, |
| Li Hong | Benjamin | He Shengmei's son | 2-4, |
| Chloe Ng | Cecelia | He Shengmei's daughter | 2-4, |
| Ray Nu D/O Su Wan | Rose | He Shengmei's maid | 2-5, |
| Welyn Ang | Ivy | Works at 'Your Home Living' | |
| Chen Hanwei 陈汉玮 | Antonio Chen Hongyu | He Xuemei's ninth matchmade date | 5 Cameo appearance |
| Zheng Rongming | Mr M | Maggie; Huixin's chat-mate who turns out to be a pedophile (Arrested - episode 9 Epilogue) | 7-8 |
| Valere Ng | Margaret | Mo Xiaoling's daughter | 12-20 |
| Joy Yak | Kelly | | |
| Aden Tan | Nat | Chen Huiyan's ex-love interest | |
| Zong Zijie | Darren | Abigail's brother | |
| Teh Kaixin | Angel Lim | School bully but realized her mistakes and became friends with Chen Huiyan | |
| Jerry Yeo 杨伟烈 | Leo | Villain; Zhang Guoqiang's ex-friend | |

== Music ==
| Song title | Performer | Type of song |
|---|---|---|
| 未知數 | Bonnie Loo | Theme and sub-theme song |
| 男儿当自强 | 黄沾 | Song |

== Accolades ==
| Year | Organisation | Category | Nominee | Result | Ref |
|---|---|---|---|---|---|
| 2016 | Star Awards | Best Screenplay | Ang Eng Tee | Won | |
| 2016 | Star Awards | Best Theme Song | "未知数" | Nominated | |
| 2016 | Star Awards | Best Supporting Actress | Bonnie Loo | Nominated | |
| 2016 | Star Awards | Best Supporting Actor | Ian Fang | Nominated | |
| 2016 | Star Awards | Best Drama Serial | —N/a | Nominated | |
| 2016 | Star Awards | Top Rated Drama Series | —N/a | Won | |
| 2016 | Star Awards | London Choco Roll Happiness Award | Ian Fang | Nominated | |
| 2016 | Fame Awards | Best Actress in a Leading Role | Julie Tan | Nominated | |
| 2016 | Fame Awards | Best Theme Song | "未知数" | Nominated | |

== See also ==
- List of MediaCorp Channel 8 Chinese drama series (2010s)
