= List of actors with two or more Star Awards in acting categories =

Mediacorp has given Star Awards to actors and actresses for their performances in drama serials since its inception. Throughout the history of the Star Awards, there have been actors and actresses who have received multiple Star Awards for Best Actor, Best Actress, Best Supporting Actor, or Best Supporting Actress.

As of 2026, 24 actors and actresses have received two or more Star Awards in acting categories. Chen Hanwei leads the way with ten awards (seven Best Actor awards and three Best Supporting Actor awards), while Xie Shaoguang has won seven awards (five Best Actor awards and two Best Supporting Actor awards). Huang Biren and Xiang Yun remain as the most-awarded female actresses, with five wins each. Xie was the first to receive four awards in 1998, followed by Xiang Yun in 2009, and most recently Chen in 2010. Xie was also the first to receive five, six, and seven awards in 1999, 2003 and 2004 respectively, followed by Chen in 2015, 2017, and 2018. Chen became the first actor to receive eight, nine and ten awards in 2019, 2022 and 2025, respectively.

Actor/Actress	Best Actor/Actress awards	Best Supporting Actor/Actress awards	Total awards	Total nominations
Chen Hanwei 陈汉玮	Love Me, Love Me Not 真爱无敌 (2001); A Life of Hope 活下去 (2005); By My Side 不凡的爱 (2009); Daddy at Home 企鹅爸爸 (2010); The Gentlemen 来自水星的男人 (2017); A Million Dollar Dream 给我一百万 (2019); Recipe of Life 味之道 (2022)	The Journey: Tumultuous Times 信约：动荡的年代 (2015); The Lead 第一主角 (2018); Unforgiveable 不可饶恕的罪恶 (2025)	10	20
Xie Shaoguang 谢韶光	The Last Rhythm 曲终魂断 (1996); Stand by Me 家人有约 (1998); Stepping Out 出路 (1999); Holland V 荷兰村 (2003); Double Happiness I 喜临门I (2004)	Larceny of Love 雌雄大盗 (1995); The Golden Pillow 金枕头 (1996)	7	9
Xiang Yun 向云		Around People's Park 珍珠街坊 (1998); My Home Affairs 家事 (2000); The Challenge 谁与争锋 (2001); The Little Nyonya 小娘惹 (2009); Your World in Mine 你的世界我们懂 (2023)	5	13
Huang Biren 黄碧仁	Stand by Me 家人有约 (1998); Beautiful Connection 九层糕 (2002); My Lucky Charm 情来运转 (2005); Recipe of Life 味之道 (2022); Your World in Mine 你的世界我们懂 (2023)		5	11
Chen Liping 陈莉萍	Holland V 荷兰村 (2003); Reunion Dinner 团圆饭 (2010); The Dream Makers 志在四方 (2014)	Emerald Hill - The Little Nyonya Story 小娘惹之翡翠山 (2026)	4	16
Zoe Tay 郑惠玉	The Golden Pillow 金枕头 (1996); You Can Be an Angel 2 你也可以是天使 2 (2017); A Million Dollar Dream 给我一百万 (2019); My Guardian Angels 单翼天使 (2021)		4	15
Qi Yuwu 戚玉武	The Family Court 走进走出 (2011); The Dream Makers II 志在四方 II (2016); A Quest to Heal 我的女侠罗明依 (2021)		3	13
Lin Meijiao 林梅娇		Game Plan 千方百计 (2013); Fifty & Fabulous 五零高手 (2019); My Star Bride 过江新娘 (2022)	3	12
Tay Ping Hui 郑斌辉	Bountiful Blessings 万福楼 (2012)	Stepping Out 出路 (1999); Unriddle 2 最火搭档2 (2013)	3	11
Li Nanxing 李南星	Wounded Tracks 伤城记 (1995); The Vagrant 豹子胆 (2002); The Undisclosed 迷云二十天 (2006)		3	10
Joanne Peh 白薇秀	The Little Nyonya 小娘惹 (2009); A Tale of 2 Cities 乐在双城 (2012)	The Journey: Tumultuous Times 信约：动荡的年代 (2015)	3	10
Rebecca Lim 林慧玲	Yes We Can! 我们一定行！ (2015); The Lead 第一主角 (2018)	The Dream Makers 志在四方 (2014)	3	10
Ivy Lee 李锦梅	Angel's Dream 真相 (2000); Double Happiness I 喜临门I (2004); Family Matters 法庭俏佳人 (2006)		3	6
Huang Yiliang 黄奕良		The Vagrant 豹子胆 (2002); Holland V 荷兰村 (2003); Women of Times 至尊红颜 (2006)	3	5
Kym Ng 鐘琴	Till The End 陪你到最后 (2024)	When Duty Calls 卫国先锋 (2018); Daybreak 天空渐渐亮 (2021)	3	7
Aileen Tan 陈丽贞	Three Women and A Half 三个半女人 (2001)	Hero 大英雄 (2017); Shero (TV series) (2024)	3	14
Christopher Lee 李铭顺	The Price of Peace 和平的代价 (1997); Show Hand 注定 (2013)		2	14
Hong Huifang 洪慧芳		The Price of Peace 和平的代价 (1997); The Shining Star 星闪闪 (2006)	2	12
Chen Shucheng 陈澍城		The Oath 行医 (2012); A Million Dollar Dream 给我一百万 (2019)	2	12
Chew Chor Meng 周初明	Hainan Kopi Tales 琼园咖啡香 (2000)	The Golden Path 黄金路 (2009)	2	11
Rui En 瑞恩	With You 我在你左右 (2011); Unriddle 2 最火搭档2 (2013)		2	10
Yvonne Lim 林湘萍	Metamorphosis 破茧而出 (2007)	Portrait of Home 同心圆 (2005)	2	8
Desmond Tan 陈泂江	When Duty Calls 卫国先锋 (2018); Devil Behind the Gate 庭外的一角 (2026)		2	6
Chen Guohua 陈国华		Around People's Park 珍珠街坊 (1998); My Home Affairs 家事 (2000)	2	3
