= Star Awards for Favourite Female Show Stealer =

Singaporean television award (2010–2023)

Star Awards for Favourite Female Show Stealer 最喜爱女角色
- Current: Star Awards 2023
- Awarded for: Most Popular Drama Series or Variety Character by an Actress
- Country: Singapore
- Presented by: Mediacorp
- First award: 2010
- Currently held by: Vacant

The Star Awards for Favourite Female Show Stealer is an award presented annually at the Star Awards, a ceremony that was established in 1994. It is given to an actress who portrayed a drama series or variety show character that is deemed the most popular among the television audience.

The Favourite Female Show Stealer award has been presented nine times, to four actresses. The first winner was Jeanette Aw for her role in Together (2009). The most recent winner is Jesseca Liu for Soul Detective (2022). The record for most wins is four, held by Aw, followed by Rui En winning three. The record for most nominations is eight, held by Rui En.

== History ==
The Star Awards for Favourite Female Character was first introduced in 2010, at the 16th Star Awards ceremony where the award was first given out to Jeanette Aw for her role in Together.

Prior to 2012, the nominees were determined by a team of judges employed by Mediacorp. The rule was removed in 2012 to allow the public to determine the nominees entirely via online voting. Winners are also selected by a majority vote from the public via online voting as well.

The award was discontinued from 2017, along with the Favourite Male Character and Favourite Onscreen Couple (Drama) awards. In 2022, the award was revived but was renamed as Favourite Female Show Stealer. The award was discontinued in 2024

== Recipients ==
Year	Actress	Role (title)	Nominees	Ref
2010	Jeanette Aw	Yao Jianhong 姚剑虹 (Together)	Dennis Chew — Auntie Lucy (Paris and Milan ); Felicia Chin — Huang Liping 黄丽萍 (Baby Bonus ); Felicia Chin — Sun Min 孙敏 (The Ultimatum); Felicia Chin — Tao Haitong 陶海桐 (Love Blossoms II); Jesseca Liu — Lin Jiale 林佳乐 (The Dream Catchers ); Rui En — Lin Jiaqi 林佳琪 (The Dream Catchers ); Rui En — Zhang Luoyun 张洛芸 (My School Daze ); Michelle Tay — Wu Xiaoli 吴晓莉 (Perfect Cut 2 ); Fann Wong — Fang Songqiao 方宋乔 (The Ultimatum )	
2011	Rui En	Yang Xiaodong 杨小东 (Happy Family )	Jeanette Aw — Yang Nianqing 杨念青 (Breakout ); Michelle Chong — Xie Yuyu (Black Rose); Quan Yi Fong — Yao Yao 摇摇 (Black Rose); Zhou Ying — Tang Ying 汤颖 (Breakout )	
2012	Rui En	Zhang Yale 章雅乐 (A Tale of 2 Cities)	Kimberly Chia — Ah Ya 阿压 (On the Fringe ); Ann Kok — Feng Yueman 冯月满 (Kampong Ties ); Jesseca Liu — Yang Minfei 杨敏妃 (The Oath ); Chloe Wang — Lin Shanshan 林珊珊 (Devotion )	
2013	Rui En	Liu Yanzhi 刘言之 (Poetic Justice )	Kimberly Chia — Deng Yilin 邓怡琳 (Don't Stop Believin' ); Felicia Chin — Du Siman 杜思曼 (Don't Stop Believin' ); Ann Kok — Vivian (It Takes Two ); Rebecca Lim — Feng Luoling 冯洛凌 (Poetic Justice )	
2014	Jeanette Aw	Zhao Fei'er 赵非儿 (The Dream Makers)	Rebecca Lim — Guo Weiqian 郭玮茜 (Sudden ); Joanne Peh — Zhang Huiniang 张蕙娘 (The Journey: A Voyage); Rui En — Fang Tonglin 方彤琳 (The Dream Makers ); Zoe Tay — Zhou Weiyun 周薇芸 (The Dream Makers )	
2015	Jeanette Aw	Hong Minghui 洪明慧 (The Journey: Tumultuous Times)	Kimberly Chia — Ye Xiaofeng 叶晓枫 (World at Your Feet ); Felicia Chin — Pan Xiaomin 潘小敏 (In The Name Of Love ); Rebecca Lim — Zhang Xueqin 张雪芹 (Yes We Can! ); Rui En — Qiu Xueqing 邱雪清 (Against the Tide )	
2016	Jeanette Aw	Zhao Fei'er 赵非儿 (The Dream Makers II)	Hong Ling — Wang Yuye 王玉叶 (118); Huang Biren — Guan Xie'en 官谢恩 (The Dream Makers II); Rui En — Fang Tonglin 方彤琳 (The Dream Makers II); Xiang Yun — Yu Fang 于芳 (Super Senior)	
Favourite Female Show Stealer 最吸睛女角色 (2022)
2022	Chantalle Ng	Mai Phương Thảo 梅芳草 (My Star Bride )	Jesseca Liu - (Crouching Tiger Hidden Ghost) as Lin Xiaofang 林小芳; Joanne Peh - (Mind Jumper) as Khoo Kaile 邱凯乐; Rui En - Mister Flower as Chen Huiling 陈慧玲; Tasha Low - (Live Your Dreams) as Lee Sitong 李思彤	
2023	Jesseca Liu	Liu Shuqin 刘淑琴 (Soul Detective)	Hong Ling - (Your World In Mine) as Zheng Tianxi 郑天希; Huang Biren - (Your World In Mine) as Li Jiayun 李家云; Xiang Yun - (Your World In Mine) as Wang Jinhui 王金慧; Tasha Low - (Genie In A Cup) as She Xiaoqian 佘小倩	

^{^[I]} Each year is linked to the article about the Star Awards held that year.

== Category facts ==
Most wins

Rank	1st	2nd
Actress	Jeanette Aw	Rui En
Total wins	4 wins	3 wins

Most nominations

Rank	1st	2nd	3rd	4th
Actress	Rui En	Jeanette Aw; Felicia Chin	Jesseca Liu	Kimberly Chia; Rebecca Lim
Total nominations	9 nominations	5 nominations	4 nominations	3 nominations
