= Secrets for Sale =

- 拍。卖
- Written by: Molby Low 刘健财; Wong Lee Lin 黄丽琳
- Directed by: Wong Foon Hwee 黄芬菲; Canter Chia 谢光华
- Starring: Christopher Lee; Jesseca Liu; Thomas Ong; Lin Meijiao; Lawrence Wong; Pan Lingling
- Opening theme: 《缠斗》by Anthony Neely
- Ending theme: 《缠斗》by Anthony Neely
- Country of origin: Singapore
- Original language: Mandarin
- No. of episodes: 13

Production
- Producer: Molby Low 刘健财
- Running time: 45 minutes (approx.)
- Production company: Wawa Pictures

Original release
- Network: Mediacorp Channel U
- Release: 13 March – 29 March 2011

Related
- Love Exchange; Forensic Heroes II; The Oath

Secrets for Sale (拍·卖）is a Singapore television drama series, produced by Wawa Pictures. It is Channel U's blockbuster of the year for 2011 and debuted on 14 March 2011. It is aired from Monday to Friday at 10:00pm. It has received much overwhelming response and raves from the viewers since its debut. The viewership reached 1,150,000, making it the most popular drama of the year 2011.

== Plot ==
Secrets for Sale is a drama series revolving around a group of private investigators exposing the darkest secrets of individuals across the society. An ex-cop (Jesseca Liu) inherits a private detective agency from her sister and husband after they vanish without a trace. The technologically challenged lass then teams up with a sleazy debt-ridden photographer (Christopher Lee) to solve the mystery. Can they break the case without killing each other first?

== Cast ==
| Actors | Roles |
|---|---|
| Christopher Lee 李铭顺 | Zheng Renyi 郑仁义 |
| Jesseca Liu 刘子绚 | Zhou Jiaqi 周家琦 |
| Thomas Ong 王沺裁 | Stanley Chen Liang'an 陈亮安 |
| Pan Lingling 潘玲玲 | Zhou Jiamei 周家美 |
| Lawrence Wong 王冠逸 | Guo Anjin 郭安进 |
| Lin Meijiao 林梅娇 | Bao Huimei 包惠美 |
| Chen Shucheng 陈澍成 | Uncle Chen 老陈 |
| Lieu Yanxi 刘彦希 | Zhang Yixin 张一心 |
| Yao Wenlong 姚文龙 | Zhang Zihao 张子豪 |
| Julie Tan 陈欣淇 | Yumi |
| Zhu Houren 朱厚任 | Zhou's father |
| Hsu Chiung Fang 许琼芳 | Zhou's mother |
| Rebecca Lim 林慧玲 | Lin Yawen 林雅文 |
| Chew Chor Meng 周初明 | Professor Xie 谢教授 |
| Koh Yah Hwee 许雅惠 | Annie 安妮 |

== Music ==
The theme song of Secrets For Sale is 《缠斗》 by Taiwanese singer Anthony Neely in the album <Lesson One>. The side track 《散场的拥抱》 is also by Anthony.

== Overseas broadcast ==
| Country of Broadcast | Broadcasting Network | Debut | Finale |
|---|---|---|---|
| Malaysia | ntv7 | 10 January 2012 | 2 February 2012 |

== Star Awards 2012 nominations ==
=== Asian Television Awards ===
Secrets For Sale were highly commended alongside Breakout for Best Drama Screenplay in the 2011 Asian Television Awards.

=== Star Awards 2012 Nominations ===
- Secrets For Sale was nominated for the Best Drama Series, but the award goes to On the Fringe 2011.
- The theme song 缠斗 by Anthony Neely was nominated for the Best Drama Theme Song award, but the award goes to Devotion's theme song.
