= Code of Honour =

- 正义武馆
- Genre: Period drama Martial arts
- Created by: Koh Teng Liang
- Starring: Elvin Ng; Rui En; Andie Chen; Paige Chua; Zheng Geping; Chris Tong; Tiffany Leong
- Opening theme: 她是 by Zhang Xin Jie
- Countries of origin: Singapore; Malaysia
- Original language: Mandarin
- No. of episodes: 30

Production
- Producer: Yeo Saik Pin
- Production locations: Ipoh/Taiping, Malaysia
- Running time: 60 minutes (approx.)

Original release
- Network: Mediacorp Channel 8 (Singapore) ntv7 (Malaysia)
- Release: 5 December 2011 – 13 January 2012

Related
- Kampong Ties; The Seeds of Life

Code of Honour (Chinese: 正义武馆) is a Malaysian-Singaporean television drama series and the fifth production by MediaCorp Studios Malaysia Sdn Bhd. It stars Elvin Ng, Rui En, Andie Chen, Paige Chua, Zheng Geping, Chris Tong and, Tiffany Leong as casts of this series. It was broadcast on every Monday to Friday, 7:00pm on Singapore's free-to-air MediaCorp Channel 8, and made its debut on 5 December 2011. This drama is rated PG for several fighting scenes. In Malaysia, it was first aired on 10 January 2012 at 10:00 pm. Episodes of this drama can be viewed on Toggle.

== Cast ==
Artiste	Role	Description	Episodes Appeared
Elvin Ng 黄俊雄	Song Yazai 宋亚仔	Song Zhizhong and Tang Qiudi's younger son; Yuan Chenxi's twin brother; Long Wanyi's neighbor and sweetheart, later heartbroken over her death; Became Ou Kelu's boyfriend in the end	1–2, 5–30
Elvin Ng 黄俊雄	Yuan Chenxi 元晨曦	Yuan Zhenfei's adoptive son; Song Zhizhong and Tang Qiudi's biological son; Yuan Yueming's adoptive younger brother; Song Yazai's twin brother; Died due to car accident in Japan; (Deceased – Episode 5)	1–4
Zheng Geping 郑各评	Yuan Zhen Fei 元振飞	Tang Qiudi's husband; Yuan Chenxi's adoptive father; Yuan Yueming's father	1–30
Andie Chen 陈邦鋆	Ou Jian Feng 欧剑锋	Main Villain: Master Yuan's disciple; Ou Kelu's adoptive elder brother; Tang Jiabao's husband; Soap seller; Later left Yuan Men martial arts due to being expelled, and became a part of Qian Feng martial arts	1–30
Rui En 瑞恩	Ou Ke Lu 欧可璐	Ou Jianfeng's adoptive younger sister; Song Yazai's girlfriend; Yuan Chenxi's love interest; Knew that she was adopted at the end	1–30
Chris Tong 童冰玉	Long Wan Yi 龙婉怡	Song Yazai's neighbour and sweetheart; Long Xianpo's niece; Naïve and gullible; Kidnapped by Duan Tianhe, later shot to death by Xiao Hei; (Deceased – Episode 26)	6–24, 26
Paige Chua 蔡琦慧	Tang Jia Bao 唐佳宝	Duan Tianhe's sister-in-law; Ou Jianfeng's sweetheart; Da Touzhen's cousin; Pregnant with Ou Jianfeng's baby	3–27, 30
Tiffany Leong 绰琦	Yuan Yue Ming 元月明	Villain: Yuan Zhenfei's daughter; Yuan Chenxi's adoptive elder sister; Cai Xiyang's wife; Died due to multiple blows in the head using Yuan family's heirloom; (Deceased – Episode 30)	1-
Zhang Xinxiang	Duan Tian He 段天河	Villain: Master Yuan's former disciple; (Deceased- Episode 29)	
Lavin Seow 萧伊婷	Long Xian Bo 龙显波	Long Wanyi's aunt	

== Synopsis ==
It is 1963 and the Yuan Clan Martial Arts Association is in turmoil. Clan head Yuan Zhen Fei suffered several personal tragedies; his wife suffered brain damage and their son Chenxi was killed in a road accident. Several of his former disciples have gone rogue and now want to usurp him as head. Unknown to Zhen Fei, his wife had an affair with Song Zhi Zhong and had twin boys. To cover up the affair, she took one twin, Chenxi, while Song took the other, Yazai, and moved away to Malaysia. Song Yazai is a fisherman who lives a contented life without ambition for fame or fortune. By circumstance he was taken into the Yuan clan as he was mistaken for Chenxi but is eventually accepted by Zhen Fei. Zhen Fei's rogue disciple Duan Tian He has been wreaking havoc around town by using his martial arts skills for evil purposes with the intent of unseating Zhen Fei as head. Yazai soon finds himself in the middle of a long and bloody family feud between his ancestral clan and the Yuans. When his sweetheart Wanyi dies in the bitter struggle, a distraught Yazai decides he has had enough of the fighting and exiles himself to a small village. However a local tycoon has been eyeing the villagers' land and hires Duan Tian He to chase them out by force. Yazai defeats Tian He and kills him but the family feud has reached a boiling point. Another of Zhen Fei's former disciples Ou Jian Feng devises a complicated to plan to end it once and for all. Can Jian Feng and Yazai put to bed a long-lasting animosity and hatred?

== Trivia ==
- This drama was planned not to be a co-production with NTV7. It was first broadcast in Singapore before exclusive broadcasting rights were sold to Malaysia.
- This drama stars Mediacorp artistes Rui En, Elvin Ng and Paige Chua who have not taken part in Malaysian co-productions before.
- Rui En and Elvin Ng pair up again for the fourth time after Love at 0 °C, By My Side and The Dream Catchers.
- Elvin Ng plays two roles, as Song Yazai and Yuan Chenxi. Elvin Ng pairs up with Chris Tong for the first time; they both starred in C.L.I.F. earlier in the year but rarely shared any scenes together.
- Joanne Peh was the initial announced choice for the role of Tang Jia Bao, but was turned down as she was offered a role in A Song to Remember. Paige Chua played the role instead.
- This drama ended up being broadcast on Astro Shuang Xing as ntv7 did not broadcast the drama after five months.
- The series was repeated on Mediacorp Channel 8 at 2.00am.

== Accolades ==
Code of Honour won two nominations at the 2012 Star Awards.

Award	Actor	Outcome
Best Actor 最佳男主角	Andie Chen 陈邦鋆	Nominated
Favourite Onscreen Couple (Drama) 最喜爱荧幕情侣	Rui En 瑞恩 & Elvin Ng 黄俊雄	Won

The series was parodied at the awards ceremony with ceremony co-host Lee Teng "directing" the drama. Dennis Chew and Quan Yi Fong portrayed Elvin Ng's Song Yazai and Rui En's Ou Kelu respectively. The skit made a reference to a controversial scene from On the Fringe in which Zhang Yaodong's character had to "rape" Rui En's character.
