= A Tale of 2 Cities =

Singaporean TV series

- 乐在双城
- Genre: Idol drama Romance
- Written by: Tang Yeow 陈耀 / Paul Yuen
- Directed by: Loo Yin Kam 卢燕金
- Starring: Rui En; Joanne Peh; Pierre Png; Zhang Yaodong; Mimi Chu; Zhang Zhenhuan; Kate Pang; Yao Wenlong; Julie Tan
- Theme music composer: Johann Strauss
- Opening theme: "Springtime Voices Waltz" by Masahiro Kawasaki
- Ending theme: "Himitsu no Akko-chan" by Satoko Shimonari
- Composer: Johann Strauss
- Countries of origin: Singapore; Malaysia
- Original languages: Chinese; Subtitles; English (Singapore); Malay (Malaysia)
- No. of episodes: 21 episodes

Production
- Executive producer: Paul Yuen 袁树伟
- Production locations: Singapore; Kuala Lumpur, Malaysia
- Running time: 45 minutes
- Production companies: MediaCorp; Media Prima Berhad

Original release
- Network: MediaCorp TV Channel 8 (Singapore); NTV7 (Malaysia)
- Release: 14 February – 11 March 2011

Related
- Prosperity; Be Happy

A Tale of 2 Cities (Chinese: 乐在双城; pinyin: Lè Zài Shuāng Chéng) is a Singaporean Chinese drama which was co-produced by Media Prima Berhad and MediaCorp TV. It was telecasted on Singapore's free-to-air terrestrial television channel form MediaCorp TV Channel 8. It stars Rui En, Joanne Peh, Pierre Png, Zhang Yaodong, Mimi Chu, Zhang Zhenhuan, Kate Pang, Yao Wenlong & Julie Tan as the casts of the series.

It was telecasted on Malaysia's free-to-air terrestrial television channel form NTV7 channel it was telecasted on Singapore's free-to-air terrestrial television channel form MediaCorp TV Channel 8.

Episodes 6, 12, 13, 16 to 20 were rated PG in the encore version.

== Cast ==
=== Main cast ===
Cast	Role	Description
Rui En 瑞恩	Zhang Yale 章雅乐	Mei Jinfeng's niece Designer for "Blissful Times"; Lin Wentao's girlfriend and later wife
Joanne Peh 白薇秀	Pan Leyao 潘乐瑶	Pan Jiaxiang and Wang Cuilan's daughter Ouyang Ming's girlfriend and later wife
Pierre Png 方展发	Lin Wentao 林文涛	"Blissful Times" photographer Adopted son of Mei Jinfeng; Student of Induk Taekwondo Academy; Four-time champion (National Taekwondo Championships); Zhang Yale's boyfriend and later husband Guan Yiting's ex-boyfriend
Mimi Chu 朱咪咪	Mei Jinfeng 梅金凤	"Blissful Times" lady boss Instructor of Induk Taekwondo Academy
Zhang Yaodong 张耀栋	Ouyang Ming 欧阳明	Ouyang Feng's son Leyao's constant companion Pan Leyao's boyfriend and later husband
Zhang Zhenhuan 张振寰	Yin Zhengkai 殷正凯	CEO of Mika Group; Pan Lexuan's boyfriend and later husband Yin Zhengwen's younger brother
Kate Pang 庞蕾馨	Lin Le 林乐	Daughter of Mei Jinfeng; Pan Weisong's girlfriend and later wife
Yao Wenlong 姚彣隆	Pan Weisong 潘伟松	Pan Jiaxiang and Wang Cuilan's son Lin Le's boyfriend and later husband Used to be in love with Zhang Yale; Student of Induk Taekwondo
Julie Tan 陈欣淇	Pan Lexuan 潘乐萱	Pan Jiaxiang and Fengping's daughter Yin Zhengkai's girlfriend and later wife
Ho Kwai Lam 何貴林	Ouyang Feng 欧阳风	Mei Jinfeng's ex-enemy Father of Ouyang Ming; Ex-boss of "I Do I Do"; Instructor of Jinshan Taekwondo Academy; Later Mei Jinfeng's suitor

=== Other cast ===
Cast	Role	Description
Huang Wenyong	Pan Jiaxiang	Wang Cuilan's husband Pan Weisong, Pan Leyao and Pan Lexuan's father
Xiang Yun	Wang Cuilan	Pan Jiaxiang's wife Pan Weisong and Pan Leyao's mother
Constance Song	Yin Zhengwen	Yin Zhengkai's elder sister Chairman of Mika Group
Ya Hui	Guan Yiting	Lin Wentao's ex-girlfriend
Darren Lim	Li Zhenbang	Ex-student of Jinshan Taekwondo Academy; Student of Red Sun Taekwondo Academy; Two-time champion (National Taekwondo Championships)
Jerry Yeo	Star	Singer at a bar Cross-dresses; Lin Le's ex-boyfriend
Joshua Ang	Qian Wenlong	Pan Lexuan's ex-boyfriend

== Trivia ==
- This drama is the first MediaCorp TV drama in 2011 to have an instrumental music for the opening theme, the next three shows with music as the opening theme are C.L.I.F., On the Fringe and Bountiful Blessings.
- Some scenes in this drama were shot in Kuala Lumpur. However, it is not a co-production with NTV7. Some Kuala Lumpur scenes were also shot in Singapore.
- Originally this drama had intended to produce 21-episodes, but there would be an additional episode due to overruns in filming.
- Mimi Chu apparently plays two roles, as Mei Jinfeng and the "Fairy Godmother" in Yale's dreams (eps 1 & 21).
- Joanne Peh and Zhang Yaodong paired up again after The Greatest Love of All and Your Hand In Mine.
- Huang Wenyong and Xiang Yun were paired up for many times. Their recent pair-up was The Score.
- In Your Hand In Mine, Huang Wenyong and Yao Wenlong were brothers. In this drama, they are father and son.
- In Joys of Life, Yao Wenlong and Kate Pang were father and daughter. In this drama, they are husband and wife
- The show was originally called 'Love In Two Cities'

== Accolades ==
Organisation	Year	Category	Nominee(s)	Result	Ref
Star Awards	2012	Best Actress	Rui En	Nominated	
Star Awards	2012	Best Actress	Joanne Peh	Won	
Star Awards	2012	Best Newcomer	Kate Pang	Won	
Star Awards	2012	Best Director	Loo Yin Kam	Nominated	
Star Awards	2012	Best Screenplay	Paul Yuen and Tang Yeow	Nominated	
Star Awards	2012	Best Cameraman Award	Soh Kok Leong	Nominated	
Star Awards	2012	Favourite Female Character	Rui En	Won	

== See also ==
- List of programmes broadcast by MediaCorp Channel 8
