= Kampong Ties =

- 甘榜情
- Genre: Period drama
- Created by: Koh Teng Liang (许声亮)
- Written by: Alvin Soe
- Directed by: Kok Tzyy Haw (郭贽豪)
- Starring: Ann Kok; Yvonne Lim; Zheng Geping
- Opening theme: 甘榜情缘 (Kampong Bond) by Wei En
- Ending theme: 柔情万里 (Deep Relations) by Cui Xia and Wei En
- Countries of origin: Malaysia; Singapore
- Original language: Mandarin
- No. of episodes: 30

Production
- Producer: Yeo Saik Pin (杨锡彬)
- Running time: 60 minutes (approx.)

Original release
- Network: ntv7 (Malaysia); Mediacorp Channel 8 (Singapore)
- Release: 27 September – 16 November 2011

Related
- Love; Code of Honour

Kampong Ties is a Malaysian-Singaporean television drama series (co-production). It is also the third production by MediaCorp Studios Malaysia Sdn Bhd. It was telecast from every Monday to Thursday, at 10:00pm on Malaysia's ntv7, starting 27 September and ended on 16 November 2011. It stars Ann Kok, Yvonne Lim and Zheng Geping as casts in this series. In Singapore, the series made its debut on 24 October at 7:00pm and had ended its run on 2 December 2011. The series was repeated at 4am on Sundays.

Some episodes in Singapore were also rated PG for some violent scenes. All episodes are available on Tonton (Malaysia) and xinmsn (Singapore).

== Plot ==
Set against a backdrop of magnificent lush greenery in a secluded part of Sungai Lembing in Kuantan, Pahang. Shuixian (Yvonne Lim) was forced by her foster mother to marry Lihai (Shaun Chen), whom later died in an accident, leaving Shuixian a young widow. Yueman (Ann Kok) is married to Jiaqing (Zhang Wenxiang), an abusive man. One day, Shuixian accidentally kills Jiaqing but was saved by Yueman who claimed Jiaqing was killed by his debtors. Both of them leave the village and met Youbao (Zheng Geping), head of a secret society.

== Cast ==
- Wang Yuqing as Cai Tian Shi
- Zhang Wen Xiang as Cai Jia Qing
- Ann Kok as Feng Yue Man
- Yvonne Lim as Lin Shuixian
- Shaun Chen as Wang Li Hai
- Remon Lim as Towkay Neo
- Hong Guo Rui as Milk King
- Zheng Geping as Zeng You Bao
- Ng Hui as Han Xiuyuan
- Elvis Chin as Han Juncai
- Ling Xiao as Nine-headed Bird
- Jess Teong as Big Sis Liu

== Episodes ==
No.	Title	Original release date	Repeat telecast
1	"Episode One"	27 September 2011 U (Malaysia); 24 October 2011 (Singapore)	16 December 2012
2	"Episode Two"	28 September 2011 U (Malaysia); 25 October 2011 (Singapore)	16 December 2012
3	"Episode Three"	29 September 2011 U (Malaysia); 26 October 2011 (Singapore)	23 December 2012
4	"Episode Four"	3 October 2011 U (Malaysia); 27 October 2011 (Singapore)	23 December 2012
5	"Episode Five"	4 October 2011 U (Malaysia); 28 October 2011 (Singapore)	30 December 2012
6	"Episode Six"	5 October 2011 U (Malaysia); 31 October 2011 (Singapore)	30 December 2012
7	"Episode Seven"	6 October 2011 U (Malaysia); 1 November 2011 (Singapore)	6 January 2013
8	"Episode Eight"	10 October 2011 U (Malaysia); 2 November 2011 (Singapore)	6 January 2013
9	"Episode Nine"	11 October 2011 U (Malaysia); 3 November 2011 (Singapore)	13 January 2013
10	"Episode Ten"	12 October 2011 U (Malaysia); 4 November 2011 (Singapore)	13 January 2013
11	"Episode Eleven"	13 October 2011 U (Malaysia); 7 November 2011 (Singapore)	20 January 2013
12	"Episode Twelve"	17 October 2011 U (Malaysia); 8 November 2011 (Singapore)	20 January 2013
13	"Episode Thirteen"	18 October 2011 U (Malaysia); 9 November 2011 (Singapore)	27 January 2013
14	"Episode Fourteen"	19 October 2011 U (Malaysia); 10 November 2011 (Singapore)	27 January 2013
15	"Episode Fifteen"	20 October 2011 U (Malaysia); 11 November 2011 (Singapore)	3 February 2013
16	"Episode Sixteen"	24 October 2011 U (Malaysia); 14 November 2011 (Singapore)	3 February 2013
17	"Episode Seventeen"	25 October 2011 U (Malaysia); 15 November 2011 (Singapore)	17 February 2013
18	"Episode Eighteen"	26 October 2011 U (Malaysia); 16 November 2011 (Singapore)	17 February 2013
19	"Episode Nineteen"	27 October 2011 U (Malaysia); 17 November 2011 (Singapore)	24 February 2013
20	"Episode Twenty"	31 October 2011 U (Malaysia); 18 November 2011 (Singapore)	24 February 2013
21	"Episode Twenty-one"	1 November 2011 U (Malaysia); 21 November 2011	3 March 2013
22	"Episode Twenty-two"	2 November 2011 U (Malaysia); 22 November 2011	3 March 2013
23	"Episode Twenty-three"	3 November 2011 U (Malaysia); 23 November 2011	10 March 2013
24	"Episode Twenty-four"	7 November 2011 U (Malaysia); 24 November 2011	10 March 2013
25	"Episode Twenty-five"	8 November 2011 U (Malaysia); 25 November 2011	17 March 2013
26	"Episode Twenty-six"	9 November 2011 U (Malaysia); 28 November 2011	17 March 2013
27	"Episode Twenty-seven"	10 November 2011 U (Malaysia); 22 November 2011	24 March 2013
28	"Episode Twenty-eight"	14 November 2011 U (Malaysia); 30 November 2011	24 March 2013
29	"Episode Twenty-nine"	15 November 2011 U (Malaysia); 22 November 2011	31 March 2013
30	"Episode Thirty"	16 November 2011 U (Malaysia); 2 December 2011	31 March 2013

== Awards and nominations ==
The series was nominated for 6 awards, Best Actor, Best Supporting Actress, Favourite Female Character, Best Theme Song, Best Director, and Best Screenplay. Other dramas nominated for Best Drama Series include, C.L.I.F., Secrets of Sale, A Song to Remember, and On The Fringe, and Best Theme Songs are Secrets of Sale, A Song to Remember, Devotion and The Oath.

=== Star Awards 2012 ===
Accolades	Award	Nominee	Result
Star Awards 2012 Show 1 红星大奖2012 上半场	Best Theme Song 最佳主题曲	甘榜情缘	Nominated
Star Awards 2012 Show 1 红星大奖2012 上半场	Best Director 最佳导演	Kok Tzyy Haw	Nominated
Star Awards 2012 Show 1 红星大奖2012 上半场	Best Screenplay 最佳剧本	Koh Teng Liang	Nominated
Star Awards 2012 Show 2 红星大奖2012 下半场	Best Actor 最佳男主角	Zheng Geping 郑各评	Nominated
Star Awards 2012 Show 2 红星大奖2012 下半场	Best Supporting Actress 最佳女配角	Ng Hui 黄慧	Nominated
Star Awards 2012 Show 2 红星大奖2012 下半场	Favourite Female Character 最喜爱女角色	Ann Kok 郭舒贤	Nominated

== See also ==
- List of programmes broadcast by ntv7
- List of programmes broadcast by Mediacorp Channel 8
