= Wawa Pictures =

Singaporean independent television production company

- Type: Privately held company
- Industry: Entertainment
- Founded: August 2007; 19 years ago
- Headquarters: Singapore
- Key people: Molby Low Kian Chye (Founder and Chief Creative Director)
- Services: Television programme production
- Website: www.wawapictures.com.sg

Wawa Pictures (Chinese: 哇哇映画; pinyin: wā wā yìng huà) is an independent television production company based in Singapore. It has produced dramas such as Three Wishes (2014), Crescendo (2015), Fire Up (2016) and Doppelganger (2018). Recent variety shows include Markets in Asia (2016) and Sherlock at Work (2016) hosted by Quan Yi Fong and Vivian Lai / Pornsak respectively.

On 14 November 2015, a Xinyao concert The Crescendo Concert – an extension of the 2015 drama Crescendo - was staged by Mediacorp TV Channel 8, record label Ocean Butterflies and Wawa at the Singapore Expo's Max Pavilion.

== History ==
Founded by Malaysian-born producer Molby Low Kian Chye (刘健财), Wawa Pictures was established in Singapore in August 2007 by Singapore's nationwide free-to-air terrestrial channels, Mediacorp TV (formerly Television Corporation of Singapore)'s Channel 5, Channel 8 and Channel U. Currently, its content is distributed to markets like Malaysia, Hong Kong, Indonesia, China and Cambodia.

== Productions ==
=== Television series ===
Debut date	End date	Title	# of episodes	Network	Ref.
9 July 2008	25 July 2008	Perfect Cut	13	Mediacorp TV Channel U	
4 March 2009	20 March 2009	Perfect Cut 2	13	Mediacorp TV Channel U	
15 March 2010	31 March 2010	The Illusionist 魔幻視界	13	Mediacorp TV Channel U	
14 March 2011	30 March 2011	Secrets for Sale	13	Mediacorp TV Channel U	
25 October 2011	21 November 2011	The Oath	20	Mediacorp TV Channel 8	
5 March 2012	21 March 2012	Show Hand 注定	13	Mediacorp TV Channel U	
9 October 2012	5 November 2012	Game Plan	20	Mediacorp TV Channel 8	
27 February 2013	27 March 2013	Marry Me 我要嫁出去	13	Mediacorp TV Channel U	
28 October 2013	22 November 2013	Disclosed	20	Mediacorp TV Channel 8	
13 January 2014	29 January 2014	Served H.O.T 烧。卖	13	Mediacorp TV Channel U	
27 October 2014	21 November 2014	Three Wishes	20	Mediacorp TV Channel 8	
23 February 2015	11 March 2015	Let It Go 分手快乐	13	Mediacorp TV Channel U	
9 September 2015	13 October 2015	Accidental Agents 绝队保险	20	Starhub TV	
23 October 2015	3 December 2015	Crescendo	30	Mediacorp TV Channel 8	
18 February 2016	16 March 2016	The Queen	20	Mediacorp TV Channel 8	
4 October 2016	31 October 2016	Fire Up	20	Mediacorp TV Channel 8	
12 February 2018	12 March 2018	Missing	15	Mediacorp TV Channel 5	
6 February 2018 (meWATCH); 11 March 2018 (Channel 8)		Doppelganger - The Prequel	10	meWATCH; Mediacorp TV Channel 8 (Aired as a telemovie)	
12 March 2018	6 April 2018	Doppelganger	20	Mediacorp TV Channel 8	
11 October 2018 (meWATCH); 29 October 2018 (Channel 8)	26 November 2018 (Channel 8)	Till We Meet Again - The Prequel 千年来说对不起之前傳	10	meWATCH; Mediacorp TV Channel 8 (2 Episodes per day)	
26 November 2018	21 December 2018	Till We Meet Again 千年来说对不起	20	Mediacorp TV Channel 8	
28 January 2019	5 March 2019	Walk With Me 谢谢你出现在我的行程里	25	Mediacorp TV Channel 8	
TBA		Walk With Me - Stories Of Us 谢谢你出现在我的行程里-那年的我们	10	meWATCH	
16 December 2019	14 January 2020	After The Stars 攻星计	22	Mediacorp TV Channel 8	
10 April 2020	28 April 2020	Best Friends Forever 致2020的我们	13	meWATCH	
1 March 2021	2 April 2021	CTRL 操控	25	Mediacorp TV Channel 8	
18 February 2022	17 March 2022	Genie In A Cup 哇到宝!	20	Mediacorp TV Channel 8	
12 April 2023	28 April 2023	Oppa, Saranghae!	13	Mediacorp TV Channel 8	
19 February 2025	18 March 2025	I Believe I Can Fly 青春小鸟	20	Mediacorp TV Channel 8	

=== Variety show ===
Debut date	Title	# of episodes	Network	Hosted by	Ref.
2009	Diminishing Horizons 消失地平线		Mediacorp TV Channel U	Thomas Ong	
31 August 2011	Culture in a Bowl 吃出一碗文化	8	Mediacorp TV Channel 8	Darren Lim	
19 September 2011	Behind Every Job 2 美差事 苦差事		Mediacorp TV Channel U	Bryan Wong, Mark Lee	
20 October 2011	The Adventures of Chris 阿顺历险记		Mediacorp TV Channel U	Christopher Lee	
7 January 2014	A Taste of History 寻味地图		Mediacorp TV Channel U	Bryan Wong	
28 May 2015	The Taste of Time 味蕾时光机		Mediacorp TV Channel U		
28 July 2015	Home Away From Home 异乡。驿客		Mediacorp TV Channel U	Quan Yi Fong, Kate Pang	
2015	Where to Stay? 到底住哪里？		Mediacorp TV Channel U	Lee Teng, Ben Yeo, Quan Yi Fong, Youyi	
7 April 2016	Food To Go 寻。便当	10	Mediacorp TV Channel U	Pornsak	
15 September 2016	Markets in Asia 游市集	8	Mediacorp TV Channel U	Quan Yi Fong	
26 October 2016	Sherlock at Work 职场福尔摩斯	13	Mediacorp TV Channel U	Pornsak	

=== Theatre ===
Year	Title	Location	Notes
2015	The Crescendo Concert	Max Pavilion, Singapore Expo	Collaborated with Mediacorp TV Channel 8, Ocean Butterflies
2016	Crescendo The Musical	Kallang Theatre	Collaborated with Shining Entertainment Investment, Ocean Butterflies
