= Devotion (TV series) =

2011 Singaporean television series

- 阿娣
- Genre: Historical period drama
- Written by: Ng Kah Huay 黄佳华
- Directed by: Loo Yin Kam 卢燕金; Wong Foong Hwee 黄芬菲
- Starring: Zoe Tay; Chen Hanwei; Zhou Ying; Chloe Wang; Zhang Zhenhuan; Kate Pang; Adeline Lim
- Opening theme: 倔强 by Kit Chan
- Ending theme: 满足 by Wang Fang 兄妹 by Kit Chan 原乡情浓 by Wang Fang
- Country of origin: Singapore
- Original language: Chinese
- No. of episodes: 25

Production
- Producer: Soh Bee Lian 苏美莲
- Running time: approx. 45 minutes

Original release
- Network: MediaCorp Channel 8
- Release: 28 June – 1 August 2011

Related
- C.L.I.F.; On the Fringe 2011

Devotion (Chinese: 阿娣) is a Singaporean Chinese drama which was telecasted on Singapore's free-to-air channel, MediaCorp Channel 8. It stars Zoe Tay, Chen Hanwei, Zhou Ying, Cynthia Wang, Zhang Zhenhuan, Kate Pang & Adeline Lim as the casts of the series. It made its debut on 28 June 2011 and ended its run on 1 August 2011. This series repeated at 12pm on Tuesday to Saturday in 2022 Feb to 2022 March.

== Cast ==
Cast	Character	Description	Episodes Appeared
Zoe Tay	Liu Zhaodi aka. Ah Di	Main Protagonist; Foster mother of Yuanfang, Shanshan, Siwen, Shuangjie and Wufeng; Zhongzheng and Keqin's wife Dake's girlfriend Owner of "Home Flavours"; Later Dake's wife	ep 1-25
Chen Hanwei	Huang Dake	Ah Di's boyfriend Manager of a travel agency Later Ah Di's third husband	ep 1-2 ep 4-7 ep 12-25
Terence Cao	Xie Zhi'an	Police inspector Ah Di's friend	ep 2-4 ep 17-25
Yao Wenlong	Hong Keqin	Owner of "Home Flavours"; Ah Di's second husband Died (fell off a building)	ep 4-8
Alicia Lo Yu Xuan	Wang Yuanfang	Main Villain; Ruiji's daughter Shanhe's ex-girlfriend Ah Di's adopted daughter and love rival Killed Yimin; Later in prison	ep 1-7 (younger)
Zhou Ying	Wang Yuanfang	Main Villain; Ruiji's daughter Shanhe's ex-girlfriend Ah Di's adopted daughter and love rival Killed Yimin; Later in prison	ep 7-21, 23-25 (older)
Dong Lu Ying	Lin Shanshan	Yuxi's daughter Ah Di's adopted daughter Shuangjie's girlfriend	ep 1-7 (younger)
Chloe Wang	Lin Shanshan	Yuxi's daughter Ah Di's adopted daughter Shuangjie's girlfriend	ep 7-25 (older)
Oh Ling En	Xu Siwen	Zhongzheng's daughter Ah Di's stepdaughter Shuangjie's friend Deaf; Killed by Yimin (ep 22)	ep 1-7 (younger)
Kate Pang	Xu Siwen	Zhongzheng's daughter Ah Di's stepdaughter Shuangjie's friend Deaf; Killed by Yimin (ep 22)	ep 7-23 (older)
Bryan Chung 钟肇峰	Fu Shuangjie	Orphan; Ah Di's adopted son Shanshan's boyfriend Siwen's friend	ep 5-7 (younger)
Zhang Zhenhuan	Fu Shuangjie	Orphan; Ah Di's adopted son Shanshan's boyfriend Siwen's friend	ep 7-25 (older)
Lu Le Ci	Wu Feng	Aihao's biological daughter Ah Di's adopted daughter University student	ep 6-7 (younger)
Adeline Lim	Wu Feng	Aihao's biological daughter Ah Di's adopted daughter University student	ep 7-8, 11-25 (older)
Aileen Tan	Wu Aihao	Wu Feng's mother Ah Di's friend	ep 1, 4, 6, 19-25
Chen Huihui	Hong Jinzhi	Keqin's sister Former lady boss of Home Flavours	ep 4-13 ep 16-23, 25
Zhang Xinxiang	Xie Jinfu	A love cheat	ep 9-12
Brandon Wong	Wang Ruiji	Yuanfang's father Yuxi's husband and comrade Killed Zhongzheng; Died in prison (ep 16)	ep 1-3, 8, 11, 16
Lin Meijiao	Zhang Yuxi	Shanshan's mother Ruiji's wife and comrade Killed Zhongzheng	ep 1-3, 10, 21-25
Chen Guohua	Zheng Ah Nan	Yimin's father Employee of "Home Flavours"	ep 4-25
Jeffrey Xu	Zheng Yimin	Supporting Villain; Ah Nan's son Autistic; Siwen's friend Killed Siwen, later killed by Yuanfang (ep 22)	ep 12-23
Darryl Yong	Chen Shanhe	Yuanfang's ex-boyfriend	ep 8-17
Chen Shucheng	Zhuo Chunsheng	Lived alone	ep 11-18 ep 20 ep 25
Huang Wenyong	Xu Zhongzheng	Ah Di's first husband Siwen's father Killed by Ruiji and Yuxi	ep 1-2
Ye Shipin	Huo Yan	Ah Di's foster father	ep 1-2

== Episodes ==
No.	Title	Original release date
1	"Episode 1"	June 28, 2011
2	"Episode 2"	June 29, 2011
3	"Episode 3"	June 30, 2011
4	"Episode 4"	July 1, 2011
5	"Episode 5"	July 4, 2011
6	"Episode 6"	July 5, 2011
7	"Episode 7"	July 6, 2011
8	"Episode 8"	July 7, 2011
9	"Episode 9"	July 8, 2011
10	"Episode 10"	July 11, 2011
11	"Episode 11"	July 12, 2011
12	"Episode 12"	July 13, 2011
13	"Episode 13"	July 14, 2011
14	"Episode 14"	July 15, 2011
15	"Episode 15"	July 18, 2011
16	"Episode 16"	July 19, 2011
17	"Episode 17"	July 20, 2011
18	"Episode 18"	July 21, 2011
19	"Episode 19"	July 22, 2011
20	"Episode 20"	July 25, 2011
21	"Episode 21"	July 26, 2011
22	"Episode 22"	July 27, 2011
23	"Episode 23"	July 28, 2011
24	"Episode 24"	July 29, 2011
25	"Episode 25"	August 1, 2011

== Trivia ==
- This drama is one of three drama blockbusters in 2011, the other two being The Oath as well as A Song to Remember.
- Dai Yang Tian was offered the role Fu Shuangjie, but he turned down the role. The role was played by Zhang Zhenhuan instead.
- This drama marks Taiwan star Chloe Wang's first Singaporean drama.
- Cynthia Wang's role Lin Shanshan's surname was originally named Zhang.
- This drama encored from 13 June 2012 to 17 July 2012 at 5.30pm. Unriddle 2 was supposed to make a quick encore the weekday after The Oath's encore finale, which is on the timespan stated and also planned to end a week earlier, but the channel wanted to encore this drama due to strong rating symbol guide in Singapore media.

== Accolades ==
Organisation	Year	Category	Nominee	Result	Ref
Star Awards	2012	Best Actress	Zoe Tay	Nominated	
Star Awards	2012	Young Talent Award	Dong Lu Ying	Nominated	
Star Awards	2012	Young Talent Award	Oh Ling En	Nominated	
Star Awards	2012	Young Talent Award	Yong Joe Yan	Nominated	
Star Awards	2012	Best Newcomer	Adeline Lim	Nominated	
Star Awards	2012	Best Newcomer	Jeffrey Xu	Nominated	
Star Awards	2012	Best Drama Theme Song	'倔强' by Kit Chan	Won	
Star Awards	2012	Best Director	Loo Yin Kam	Nominated	
Star Awards	2012	Best Drama Cameraman	Tommy Lee	Nominated	
Star Awards	2012	Best Drama Set Design	Wong Lab Seng	Nominated	
Star Awards	2012	Best Drama Editing	Poon Yiu Tung	Nominated	
Star Awards	2012	Favourite Female Character	Lin Shanshan (played by Chloe Wang)	Nominated	
