= Zhang Zhenxuan =

Chinese actor

- Born: Zhang Zhenhuan; Sichuan, China
- Education: National University of Singapore
- Occupations: Actor; model
- Years active: 2008−present
- Agents: - The Celebrity Agency (2008-2018); - Xinghe Culture (2018-present)
- Spouse: Sally Pan Sichen
- Children: 2
- Modeling information
- Height: 1.84 m (6 ft 1/2 in)

Stage name
- Traditional Chinese: 張振煊
- Simplified Chinese: 张振煊
- Hanyu Pinyin: Zhāng Zhènxuān
- Wade–Giles: Chang1 Chen3 Xuan1

Birth name
- Traditional Chinese: 張振寰
- Simplified Chinese: 张振寰
- Hanyu Pinyin: Zhāng Zhènhuán

Zhang Zhenxuan (born Zhang Zhenhuan) is a Chinese actor formerly based in Singapore. Named as one of the 8 Dukes of Caldecott Hill, Zhang was a full-time Mediacorp artiste from 2008 to 2018.

== Early life ==
Zhang was born in Sichuan, China and moved to Singapore as a teenager. He graduated from the National University of Singapore with a degree in civil engineering.

== Career ==
In 2008, Zhang was spotted after his runner-up finish in the MediaCorp Channel U talent show U Are The One and was signed by MediaCorp. Prior to that, he had a small cameo appearance on the last episode of Rhapsody in Blue in 2006. He was nominated for the Best Newcomer Award at the Star Awards 2009. His breakthrough came in the 2009 anniversary drama Together and he won nominations for the best supporting actor at the Star Awards and Asian Television Awards in 2010. His career peaked when he picked up his first trophy, the Top 10 Most Popular Male Artistes at the Star Awards 20 and was also crowned as one of the 8 Dukes of Caldecott Hill. The following year, in 2015, he bagged both the Favourite Male Character and Favourite Onscreen Couple awards for his work in World at Your Feet at the Star Awards 2015.

== Personal life ==
In 2020, he announced that he has changed his name to Zhang Zhenxuan, saying that his birth name was too complicated.

Zhang has a son and a daughter with Wenzhou native Sally Pan Sichen, whom he met while she was studying in Singapore. He was introduced to his wife, who is 11 years his junior, by host Lee Teng in 2016. The couple started a relationship two years later but have broke up a few times in between. Their son was born in March 2020. A year later, in September 2021, Zhang announced on Instagram that he has a second child, a daughter.

== Filmography ==
=== Television series ===
Year	Title	Role	Notes	Ref.
2006	Rhapsody In Blue	Hao Nan		
2008	The Dream Catchers	Hu Yuanjing		
2009	Together	Yao Wuji		
2009	The Ultimatum	Fang Songqing		
2010	New Beginnings	Li Ziyang		
2010	Mrs P.I.	Gao Xiang		
2011	A Tale of 2 Cities	Yin Zhengkai		
2011	Devotion	Fu Shuangjie		
2011	The Oath	Guo Jianzhong		
2012	Absolutely Charming	Wu Zikang		
2012	Jump!	Xu Dele		
2013	Break Free	Ye Zhibin		
2013	Start Up! (创！)	Zhang Jiajie		
2013	Sudden	Sun Dalun		
2014	World at Your Feet	Gao Guotian		
2014	Against The Tide	Zhuo Dingkang		
2014	118	Clinton Li Chengfeng		
2015	Good Luck	Lin Shijun		
2015	The Journey: Our Homeland	Yan Yisheng		
2015	Sealed with a Kiss	Zheng Danle		
2015	The Dream Makers II	Chen Guang		
2016	The Dream Job	Zhang Lixing		
2016	Hero	George Pu		
2017	Home Truly	Su Dongbo		
2017	Legal Eagles	Lian Ansheng		
2017	Have A Little Faith	Shen Mingren		
2017	While We Are Young	Tang Yiwei		
2018	Reach For The Skies	Hong Duoduo		
2020	I Am Madam (我是女官)	J.D Yip		
2021	The Heartland Hero	Li Kangren		

=== Film ===
Year	Title	Role
2011	It's a Great, Great World	Ah Leong

== Discography ==
=== Compilation albums ===
Year	English title	Mandarin title
2009	MediaCorp Music Lunar New Year Album 09	新传媒群星贺岁福牛迎瑞年
2010	MediaCorp Music Lunar New Year Album 10	群星贺岁金虎迎富贵
2013	MediaCorp Music Lunar New Year Album 13	新传媒群星贺岁金蛇献祥和
2015	MediaCorp Music Lunar New Year Album 15	新传媒群星金羊添吉祥
2016	MediaCorp Music Lunar New Year Album 16	新传媒群星金猴添喜庆
2017	MediaCorp Music Lunar New Year Album 17	新传媒群星咕鸡咕鸡庆丰年

== Awards and nominations ==
Year	Ceremony	Category	Nominated work	Result (s)	Ref
2009	Star Awards	Best Newcomer	—N/a	Nominated	
2010	Star Awards	Best Supporting Actor	Together (as Yao Wuji)	Nominated	
2010	Asian Television Award	Best Actor in a Supporting Role	Together (as Yao Wuji)	Nominated	
2014	Star Awards	Top 10 Most Popular Male Artistes	—N/a	Won	
2014	Star Awards	Best Supporting Actor	Break Free (as Ye Zhibin)	Nominated	
2014	Star Awards	Star Awards for Most Popular Regional Artiste (China)	—N/a	Nominated	
2015	Star Awards	Favourite Male Character	World At Your Feet (as Gao Guotian)	Won	
2015	Star Awards	Favourite Onscreen Couple (with Jeanette Aw)	World At Your Feet (as Gao Guotian)	Won	
2015	Star Awards	Toggle Outstanding Duke Award	—N/a	Nominated	
2015	Star Awards	Best Supporting Actor	Against The Tide (as Zhou Dingkai)	Nominated	
2015	Star Awards	Star Awards for Most Popular Regional Artiste (China)	—N/a	Nominated	
2015	Star Awards	Star Awards for Most Popular Regional Artiste (Indonesia)	—N/a	Nominated	
2016	Star Awards	Favourite Male Character	Sealed with a Kiss (as Zheng Danle)	Nominated	
2016	Star Awards	Top 10 Most Popular Male Artistes	—N/a	Won	
2016	Star Awards	Favourite Onscreen Couple (with Julie Tan)	The Dream Makers II (as Chen Guang)	Nominated	
2016	Star Awards	Best Supporting Actor	The Dream Makers II (as Chen Guang)	Won	
2016	Star Awards	Asian Television Awards	The Dream Makers II (as Chen Guang)	Nominated	
2017	Star Awards	Top 10 Most Popular Male Artistes	—N/a	Won	
2017	Star Awards	Best Actor	The Dream Job (as Zhang Lixing)	Nominated	
2017	Star Awards	Bioskin Healthiest Hair Award	The Dream Job (as Zhang Lixing)	Won	
2018	Star Awards	Best Actor	Home Truly (as Su Dongbo)	Nominated	
2018	Star Awards	Top 10 Most Popular Male Artistes	—N/a	Nominated	
