= Face Off (Singaporean talk show) =

- 这样是怎样？
- Genre: Talk show
- Presented by: Kate Pang; Danny Yeo; Quan Yi Fong; Dasmond Koh; Youyi
- Country of origin: Singapore
- Original language: Mandarin
- No. of episodes: 33

Production
- Running time: 48 minutes

Original release
- Network: Mediacorp Channel U
- Release: April 15 – November 25, 2015

Related
- Project W

Face Off (Chinese: 这样是怎样？) is a talk show produced by Mediacorp Channel U. It is hosted by a rotating team of two presenters, from a team of the five hosts Kate Pang, Danny Yeo, Quan Yi Fong, Dasmond Koh and Youyi. Every week, four to five invited guests from different sectors of society carry out a discussion on different social topics. The show begins with a re-enactment of a situation to bring out the social dilemma of the weekly topic. Hosts then engage in an in-depth discussion and debate with the guests. There is also live audience participation to allow public opinions to be heard.

== Accolades ==
Organisation	Year	Award	Nominee / work	Result	Ref.
Star Awards	2016	Best Programme Host	Kate Pang	Nominated	
Star Awards	2016	Best Info-Ed 最佳资讯节目	—N/a	Nominated	

== See also ==
- Mediacorp Channel U
