= Ix Shen =

Singaporean actor (born 1972)

- 沈倾
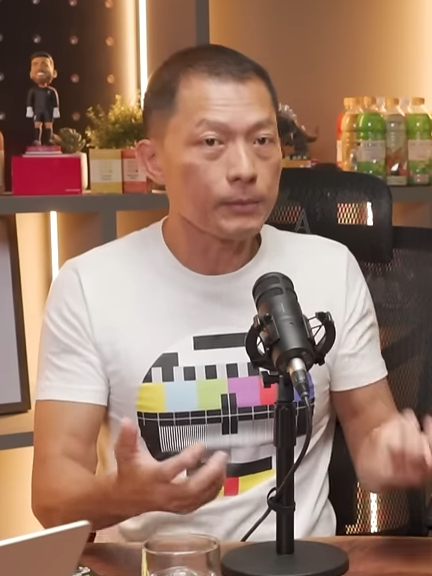
- Shen in 2024
- Born: Shen Qingshan; 11 March 1972 (age 54); Singapore
- Other names: Shen Qing; Shen Qingshan
- Occupations: Actor; film production crew; writer
- Years active: 1995−present
- Spouse: Natalia (m. 2015)
- Awards: Star Search 1995 : Male Champion

Stage name
- Traditional Chinese: 沈傾
- Simplified Chinese: 沈倾
- Hanyu Pinyin: Shěn Qīng

Birth name
- Traditional Chinese: 沈傾掞
- Simplified Chinese: 沈倾掞
- Hanyu Pinyin: Shěn Qīngshàn

Ix Shen (born 11 March 1972), also known as Shen Qing, is a Singaporean actor and film production crew. He was based in Ukraine when Russia invaded the country in 2022, and was known to provide first-hand accounts via the Internet.

== Career ==
Shen began his acting career in TCS (now Mediacorp) in 1995 after emerging the male winner of Star Search, a televised talent search competition. In 2000, he joined SPH MediaWorks not long after the latter was established. In late 2004 SPH MediaWorks was merged into MediaCorp and Shen was one of the 20 artistes who rejoined MediaCorp.

The 2007 television series Honour and Passion, produced by MediaCorp Channel 8 and sponsored by Singapore's Ministry of Defence (MINDEF), featured Shen in the role of a terrorist named Wu Chengyi, who holds the lives of Singaporeans to ransom. Metamorphosis, another MediaCorp Channel 8 television series aired in 2007, also featured Shen as being involved in terrorism activities.

In 2009, he starred in 2 ntv7 shows: Lion Hearts and My Destiny which was shown in Malaysia. Shen had a small role in the 2010 film Old Cow Vs Tender Grass.

In 2011, Shen returned to local screens where he starred in the series The Oath alongside Christopher Lee, Jesseca Liu and Ann Kok. As of 2017, The Oath is Shen's last television role, but he has not ruled out a return to television.

He served as an executive director for the Chinese film Wolf Warrior 2.

== Personal life ==
It was reported by Shin Min Daily News in 2017 that Shen has removed the "掞" (shàn) from his Chinese name, after he relocated to China.

Shen married his Ukrainian wife Natalia, a traditional Chinese medicine practitioner, in 2015 and moved to Kyiv, Ukraine in 2021. When the 2022 Russian invasion of Ukraine first started, he did not intend to leave the city along with his family. During the war, he provided first-hand accounts and updates of the situation on the ground through online media. However, as the fighting in Kyiv intensified, he and his wife decided to evacuate westward from Kyiv, arriving at Lviv on 10 March 2022. The couple then proceeded to cross into Poland and travelled to Warsaw. In April 2022, Shen later volunteered and returned to Ukraine to help distribute humanitarian aid, and compared the Bucha massacre, in which Ukrainian civilians of the city were killed, tortured and raped by the then-occupying Russian troops, to Sook Ching, a mass killing of civilians suspected to be anti-Japanese in Singapore by Japanese occupation troops during World War II.

In June 2023, Shen released an autobiography book titled Impressions of an Invasion: A Correspondent in Ukraine which was published by Marshall Cavendish International.

== Filmography ==
=== Film ===
Year	Title	Role	Notes	Ref
2007	Men in White			
2009	The Wedding Game			
2010	Old Cow vs Tender Grass			
2017	Wolf Warrior 2		Executive director	

=== Television series ===
Year	Title	Role	Notes	Ref
1995	Tales of the Third Kind (第三类剧场)	Cai Jiefu		
1996	Ace Cops (妙警点三八)			
1996	Tofu Street			
1996	Marriage, Dollars and Sense (5C老公)			
1996	Tales of the Third Kind 2 (第三类剧场2 之"墙里幽魂")	Guan Minghui		
1996	Three Rooms			
1997	The Accidental Hero (流氓英雄)			
1997	From the Medical File (医生档案)			
1998	Dreams – First Love (七个梦之《豆芽梦》)	Liu Xuehui		
1998	The Return of the Condor Heroes			
1998	Legend of the Crow (乌丫传说)	Zong Jia		
1998	My Chatty Neighbours (我家楼下口多多)			
1999	From the Medical Files 2 (医生档案II)	Marc Low		
1999	Hero of the Times			
1999	Out to Win			
2000	As You Like It			
2001	Looking for Stars			
2001	Making Headlines (独家头条)			
2002	Cash is King			
2002	Feel 100%			
2003	Back to Basics (重进森林)			
2004	Money No Enough (恭喜发财)			
2004	Together Whenever (天伦)			
2004	Project J (水母计划)			
2004	Zero			
2005	Destiny	Fan Yining		
2005	A Promise for Tomorrow			
2006	Angel Lover			
2007	Honour and Passion			
2007	Metamorphosis			
2009	Lion.Hearts			
2009	My Destiny			
2011	The Oath			

== Awards and nominations ==
Year	Ceremony	Category	Nominated work	Result
1996	Star Awards	Best Newcomer	—N/a	Nominated
1996	Star Awards	Top 10 Most Popular Male Artistes	—N/a	Nominated
