= Love Thy Neighbour (Singaporean TV series) =

2011 Singaporean Chinese television series

- 四个门牌一个梦
- Genre: Family; Neighbours
- Written by: Winnie Wong 王尤红; Lau Chin Poon 刘清盆; Lim Gim Lan 林锦兰
- Starring: Ha Yu; Felicia Chin; Shaun Chen; Huang Wenyong; Lin Meijiao; Vivian Lai; Cavin Soh; Ng Hui
- Country of origin: Singapore
- Original language: Chinese
- No. of episodes: 20

Production
- Producer: Winnie Wong 王尤红
- Running time: approx. 45 minutes

Original release
- Network: MediaCorp Channel 8
- Release: 27 September – 24 October 2011

Related
- Bountiful Blessings; The Oath

Love Thy Neighbour (Chinese: 四个门牌一个梦) is a Singaporean Chinese drama which was telecasted on Singapore's free-to-air channel, MediaCorp Channel 8. It starred Ha Yu, Felicia Chin, Shaun Chen, Huang Wenyong, Lin Meijiao, Vivian Lai, Cavin Soh & Ng Hui as the cast of the series. It made its debut on 27 September 2011 and ended its run on 24 October 2011. This drama serial consists of 20 episodes, and was screened on every weekday night at 9.00 pm.

This drama is the top rated drama serial in 2011, beating C.L.I.F. as the most watched drama.

== Cast ==
- Ha Yu as Wang Dafa, a conman
- Felicia Chin as Wang Tianhu
- Shaun Chen as Ye Meng, a mechanic
- Huang Wenyong as Dai Guozhong, a former sports coach
- Lin Meijiao as Huang Lingbo
- Cavin Soh as Dai Deliang
- Ng Hui as Angelina
- Vivian Lai as Shan Shan
- Aileen Tan as Lucy
- Rebecca Lim as Bai Yufang
- Douglas Kung as Xian He
- Brandon Wong as Crazy Knife
- Sora Ma as Dai Peijun
- Tan Jun Sheng as Mozart Dai Dingxin
- as Xian Le
- Hong Hui Fang as Ruyi

== Reception ==
After six episodes were broadcast, there were public criticism that the drama was "government propaganda" trying to "brainwash" viewers, glorifying foreigners while putting down locals. There were also calls to ban the show.

The drama was the highest rated drama in 2011.

- Vivian Lai, who hails from Taiwan, had to imitate a Chinese accent in this drama. Her performance received mixed response from viewers. Detractors criticised her accent for being extremely exaggerated, while some applauded her for the comedic style she injected into the role. She managed to achieve the "Best Supporting Actress" award in Star Awards 2012.
- There is a reported sequel of this drama. However, due to Felicia Chin having to study overseas, the plan in doing the sequel was scrapped. Instead a sister production It's A Wonderful Life was produced.

On 9 October 2011, the drama's production team organised three roadshows to thank viewers for watching this drama. The three roadshows were organised at Toa Payoh, Tiong Bahru and the Chong Pang areas.

== Good Neighbour Award ==
This drama is related to the Good Neighbour Award contest. The hunt for good neighbours in Singapore ended on 25 September 2011. It yielded 4 stories in total. The 8 households were awarded with sponsored prizes worth $100 each, and also awarded Good Neighbour awards with a sash and a trophy.

== Accolades ==
| Year | Award | Category | Recipient(s) | Result | Ref |
|---|---|---|---|---|---|
| 2012 | Star Awards | Young Talent Award | Tan Jun Sheng 俊生 | Won | |
| 2012 | Star Awards | Best Screenplay | Lim Gim Lan, Lau Chin Poon and Winnie Wong | Nominated | |
| 2012 | Star Awards | Best Drama Editing | Lai Chun Kwong | Nominated | |
| 2012 | Star Awards | Best Newcomer | Sora Ma | Nominated | |
| 2012 | Star Awards | Best Supporting Actor | Brandon Wong | Nominated | |
| 2012 | Star Awards | Best Supporting Actor | Cavin Soh | Nominated | |
| 2012 | Star Awards | Best Supporting Actress | Vivian Lai | Won | |

== See also ==
- List of Love Thy Neighbour (Singaporean TV series) episodes
