= Ng Hui =

Singaporean actress and television host (born 1979)

- Born: 22 July 1979 (age 46); Singapore
- Other name: Huang Hui
- Education: Jin Shan Primary School; Raffles Girls' Secondary School; Hwa Chong Junior College
- Alma mater: Nanyang Technological University
- Occupations: Educator; actress; television host
- Years active: 2000−2012
- Awards: Star Awards 2009 : Best Supporting Actress

Chinese name
- Traditional Chinese: 黃慧
- Simplified Chinese: 黄慧
- Hanyu Pinyin: Huáng Huì

Ng Hui (born 22 July 1979) is a Singaporean educator, former actress and television host. She was prominently a full-time Mediacorp artiste from 2000 to 2012.

== Early life ==
Ng attended Jin Shan Primary School, Raffles Girls' Secondary School and Hwa Chong Junior College and graduated from Nanyang Technological University (NTU) with a degree in Communication Studies. She was awarded the Outstanding Young Alumni Award by NTU in 2008.

== Career ==
While studying in NTU, Ng went on an internship with Mediacorp to learn to be an assistant director. On the set of Living with Lydia, the casting directors asked her to audition for the sitcom and was cast as Apple Lum, Lydia's daughter in the sitcom. This started her acting career with Mediacorp.

In 2006, Ng appeared in her first film, We Are Family.

Ng was best known for her award-winning role as 'Tao Jie' in The Little Nyonya and has acted in more than 20 dramas and hosted a number of variety shows.

Ng left the entertainment industry in 2012 as she decided that she will devote her time and efforts to other areas apart from acting. She worked as an Allied Educator for Learning And Behavioural Support at a government primary school til 2022.

== Filmography ==
=== Film ===
Year	Title	Role	Notes	Ref
2006	We Are Family (左麟右李)			

=== Television series ===
Year	Title	Role	Notes	Ref
2012	Beyond	Xu Wenqian		
2012	Poetic Justice	Sunny		
2012	The Day It Rained on Our Parade	Sister Maria		
2012	Jump!	Miss Deng		
2012	Unriddle 2	Yao Wanyi		
2012	Rescue 995	Cai Jieyi		
2011	Kampong Ties	Han Xiuyuan		
2011	Love Thy Neighbour	Angelina		
2010	New Beginnings	Wu Dailin		
2009	My Buddy	Lin Sheng Lian		
2009	Happily Ever After			
2009	Perfect Cut II			
2008	The Little Nyonya	Ah Tao		
2008	The Defining Moment			
2008	Love Blossoms			
2007	Let It Shine	Guan Yulin		
2007	The Greatest Love Of All	Tang Caining		
2007	Metamorphosis	Mya Sun Meiya		
2006	The Shining Star			
2005	Family Combo II			
2004	Double Happiness			
2004	Room In My Heart			
2004	Spice Siblings			
2004	Family Combo I			
2003	Brothers 4			
2003	Always On My Mind (无炎的爱)			
2003	Romance De Amour			
2003	Heartlanders			
2002	The New Dragon Inn			
2001-2005	Living with Lydia	Apple Lum		

=== Variety shows ===
Year	Title	Ref
2003	PSC Nite	
2004	Road Feast Malaysia	
2004	I Am The One	
2004	King of Variety	
2005	KP Club II	
2005	Gone in 72 Days	
2005	Quirky Foodies	
2005	KP Club I	
2005	Weekend Delight	
2005	Star Choice	
2006	PSC Challenge	
2006	On The Beat	
2006	Spirit of Service	
2006	Chingay Parade	
2006	Y Do You Care	
2009	Easy Cooking	
2009	The Sheng Shiong Show 5	
2023	The Reunion - Ep 3	

== Awards and nominations ==
Ceremony	Year	Category	Nominated work	Result	Ref
Star Awards	2004	Best Newcomer	—N/a	Nominated	
Star Awards	2007	Best Supporting Actress	The Greatest Love of All (as Tang Caining)	Nominated	
Star Awards	2009	Best Supporting Actress	The Little Nyonya (as Tao)	Won	
Star Awards	2012	Best Supporting Actress	Kampong Ties (as Han Xiuyuan)	Nominated	
