= As You Like It (TV series) =

- 随心所遇
- Original language: Chinese
- No. of seasons: 1
- No. of episodes: 13

Production
- Running time: 46 minutes

Original release
- Release: June 28, 2000

As You Like It (随心所遇) is a Singaporean Chinese television series about four singles around the age of twenty, two guys and two girls, and the time they spend together discussing life, love, sex and work. It stars Tay Ping Hui, Ix Shen, Lynn Poh, Joey Swee and Bernard Tan.
