= Unriddle =

Singaporean TV series

- 最火搭档
- Genre: Police procedural Mystery
- Written by: 彭凯毅 Phang Kai Yee
- Directed by: 袁树伟、高淑怡、罗温温、黄芬菲
- Starring: Rui En; Chen Liping; Tay Ping Hui; Andie Chen; Xiang Yun; Joshua Ang; Zhou Ying
- Country of origin: Singapore
- Original language: Chinese
- No. of episodes: 20

Production
- Producer: 袁树伟 Paul Yuen
- Running time: approx. 45 minutes

Original release
- Network: MediaCorp Channel 8 NTV7
- Release: 4 August – 31 August 2010

Related
- Unriddle 2 (2012)

Unriddle (Chinese: 最火搭档) is a Singaporean Chinese drama which was telecast on Singapore's free-to-air channel, MediaCorp Channel 8. It stars Rui En, Chen Liping, Tay Ping Hui, Andie Chen, Xiang Yun, Joshua Ang, and Zhou Ying as the casts of the series. It made its debut on 4 August 2010. This drama serial consists of 20 episodes, and was screened on every weekday night at 9p.m.

A sequel titled Unriddle 2, was confirmed in February 2011.

== Cast ==
- Rui En as Hu Xiaoman
- Chen Liping as Lin Zhengyi (Da Bao). Zoe Tay was the initial announced choice for the role of Lin Zhengyi but gave up the role due to her pregnancy.
- Tay Ping Hui as Zhang Yuze
- Andie Chen as Yan De Wei / Chai Zhiyong
- Joshua Ang as Liu Shi San
- Zhou Ying as Zhong Ah-Ni
- Xiang Yun as Yang Qiu Jun
- Rayson Tan as Andrew Kwan
- Zheng Geping as Shan Fan/Savage
- Paige Chua as Zhang Meilin
- Wang Yuqing as Xu Zhirong

Cast	Role	Note
Brandon Wong	Wu Guosheng	Villain; Zhang Yuze's friend since 15 years ago Involved in the murder of Chai Dexing
Shaun Chen	Luo Zhongxiao	Villain; Had a past relationship with his tuition teacher, began to prey on girls with a mole and short hair, that matched the look of his tuition teacher.
Zen Chong	Villain Yu Zhenbang	
Priscelia Chan	Villain Li Meiyue	
Chen Tianwen	Chai Dexing	Chai Zhiyong's father Friends with Andrew Kwan, Xu Zhirong, Wu Guosheng and Zhang Yuze Accused to have stolen money from the group, causing a conflict Accidentally killed on a pier, after Yuze instigated a plan to corner Dexing. (Deceased - 15 years ago)
Ong Ai Leng	Li Shan	
Lin Meijiao	He Lizhen	Zhang Meilin's mother
Zhu Houren	Liu Daqing	
Pamelyn Chee	Cynthia Cheng Li Xuan	HSA Forensic Pathologist
Zhang Xinxiang		

== Episodes ==
No.	Title	Original release date
1	"Episode 1"	August 4, 2010
2	"Episode 2"	August 5, 2010
3	"Episode 3"	August 6, 2010
4	"Episode 4"	August 9, 2010
5	"Episode 5"	August 10, 2010
6	"Episode 6"	August 11, 2010
7	"Episode 7"	August 12, 2010
8	"Episode 8"	August 13, 2010
9	"Episode 9"	August 16, 2010
10	"Episode 10"	August 17, 2010
11	"Episode 11"	August 18, 2010
12	"Episode 12"	August 19, 2010
13	"Episode 13"	August 20, 2010
14	"Episode 14"	August 23, 2010
15	"Episode 15"	August 24, 2010
16	"Episode 16"	August 25, 2010
17	"Episode 17"	August 26, 2010
18	"Episode 18"	August 27, 2010
19	"Episode 19"	August 30, 2010
20	"Episode 20"	August 31, 2010

== Accolades ==
Organisation	Year	Category	Nominee(s)	Result	Ref.
Star Awards	2011	Best Actress	Chen Liping	Nominated	
Star Awards	2011	Best Supporting Actress	Xiang Yun	Nominated	
Star Awards	2011	Best Supporting Actor	Zzen Chong	Nominated	
Star Awards	2011	Best Drama Serial	Unriddle	Nominated	
