= Andie Chen =

Singaporean actor and host (born 1985)

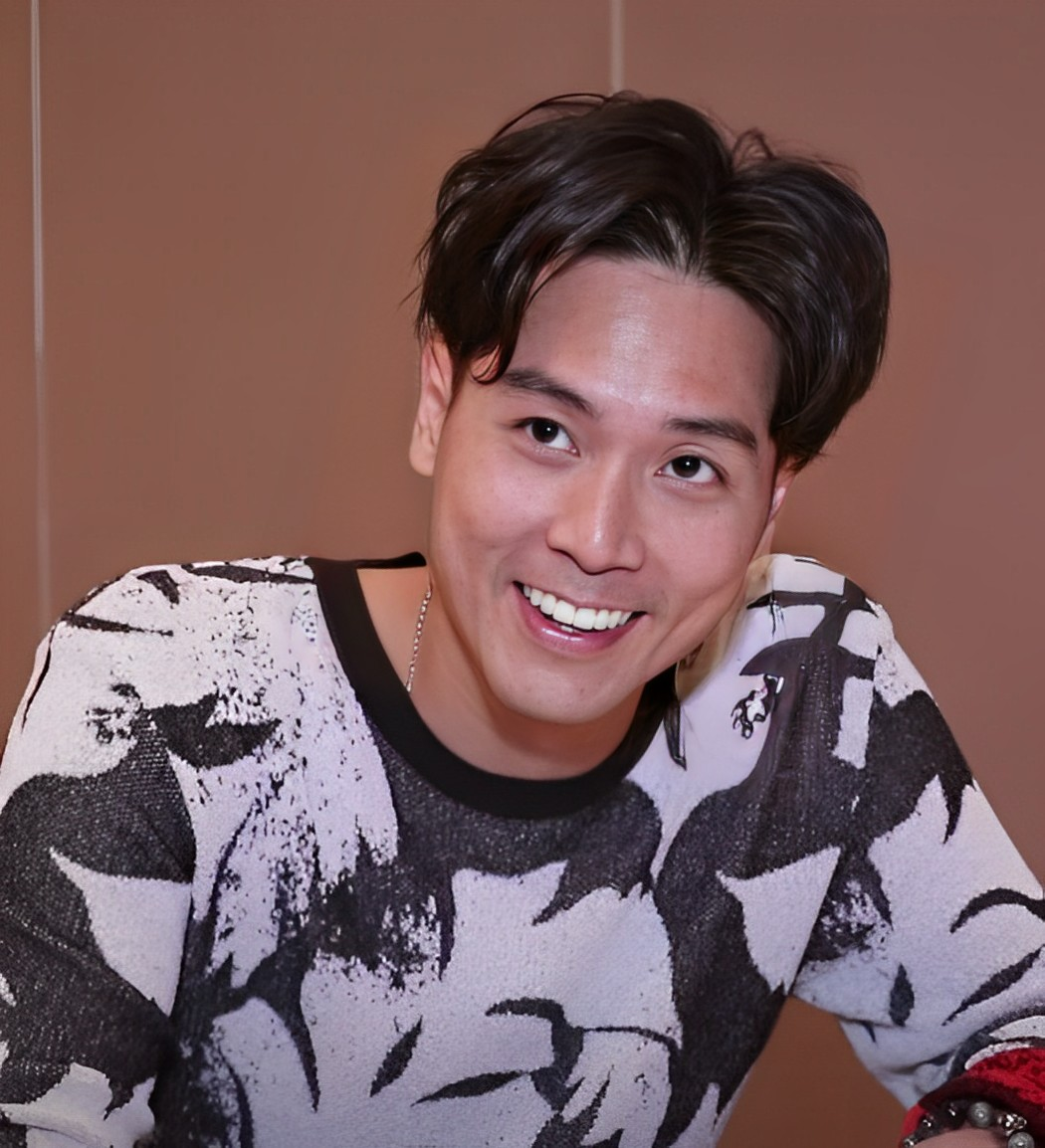
- Chen in 2017
- Born: Andy Tan Bang Jun; 16 June 1985 (age 41); Singapore
- Education: Tanglin Secondary School; Ngee Ann Polytechnic
- Occupations: Actor; host; model; vlogger
- Years active: 2007–present
- Spouse: Kate Pang (m. 2013)
- Children: 2
- Awards: Star Search 2007: Champion

Chinese name
- Traditional Chinese: 陳邦鋆
- Simplified Chinese: 陈邦鋆
- Hanyu Pinyin: Chén Bāngjūn

Andie Chen (born Andy Tan Bang Jun on 16 June 1985) is a Singaporean actor, host and vlogger, who was a full-time Mediacorp artiste from 2007 to 2017.

== Career ==
Chen's first appearance on television was in the Channel 5 series Growing Up Season 2 Ep 12: Brother Of Mine in which he made a cameo flashback appearance as a child version of Tay Wee Seng, older brother of Lim Kay Tong's character Charlie Tay Wee Kiat's older brother and was credited as Andy Tan in year 1997. He shot to prominence after winning Star Search 2007 and earned a contract with Mediacorp. He was given his first television roles the following year, most notably in the blockbuster period drama The Little Nyonya. Since then he has starred in many high-profile television dramas such as Unriddle, C.L.I.F., Code of Honour, Joys of Life, The Journey (trilogy series) and The Lead.

In August 2015, Chen played the lead role in the Mandarin musical, December Rains, by Toy Factory Productions. It was his first theatrical performance.

Chen was nominated for 3 categories at Star Awards 2017, which are Best Actor for If Only I Could, Best Supporting Actor for Hero and Top 10 Most Popular Male Artistes. On 1 November 2017, Chen announced that he will not be renewing his contract with Mediacorp.

Chen left Mediacorp on 31 October 2017 with his wife, Kate Pang. His last drama series with Mediacorp was The Lead. He was nominated for Top 10 Most Popular Male Artistes at the Star Awards 2018.

In mid 2020, Chen signed a contract with Taiwan’s EeLin Entertainment and moved to Taiwan.

In 2025, Chen made his directorial debut with a short film What Day Is It? as part of the anthology film, A Singapore Dementia Story, a collection of five short films about dementia.

== Business venture ==
While in Taiwan, Chen started playing Axie Infinity and subsequently started a company, Freedom Nation, to latch on to the game.

Chen is also the chief marketing officer of Creative Eateries, a Singaporean food and beverage company.

== Personal life ==
Chen graduated from Tanglin Secondary School and went on to Ngee Ann Polytechnic to obtain a diploma in Film, Sound and Video. He married actress Kate Pang in 2013 after a secret courtship and they have a son Aden and a daughter Avery. Chen and Pang have a parenting channel named Kandie Family which was launched in 2016.

== Filmography ==
=== Television series ===
Year	Title	Role	Notes	Ref.
2008	The Defining Moment	Lin Kexi		
2008	The Little Nyonya	Alexandre Huang Tianbao		
2009	Mr & Mrs Kok (妙探夫妻档)			
2009	Fighting Spiders	Tony Lee		
2010	Fighting Spiders II	Tony Lee		
2010	The Pupil	Andy	Episode: "Blog Out"	
2010	Friends Forever	Jeff		
2010	Precious Babes	Fu Weide		
2010	Unriddle	Yan Dewei		
2010	Unriddle	Cai Zhiyong		
2011	Code of Honour	Ou Jianfeng		
2011	C.L.I.F.	Zhao Guohuang		
2011	Prosperity	Ma Yongjie		
2012	Joys of Life	Sun Zibin		
2013	Disclosed	Zhang Letian		
2013	Break Free (曙光)	Xu Haolong		
2013	C.L.I.F. 2	Zhao Guohuang		
2014	The Journey: Tumultuous Times	Hong Dangyong		
2014	Independent Heroes (廉政英雄)	Jian Shaoxiong		
2015	Accidental Agents (绝队保险)	Johnny		
2015	The Journey: Our Homeland	Hong Dangyong		
2016	Trapped Minds (心魔)	Haolin		
2016	K.O.	Latte Wang		
2016	If Only I Could	He Daxian		
2016	Hero	Ou Jinguang		
2017	The Lead	Hong Deping		
2017	Lion Mums (Season 2)	Chong Meng		
2018	Love At Cavenagh Bridge (加文纳桥的约定)	Xiao Shaocong		
2018	My Agent Is A Hero (流浪经纪)	Max		
2019	Lion Mums (Season 3)	Chong Meng		
2019	The Driver (伺机)	Reagen		
2019	My Agent Is A Hero 2 (流浪经纪2)	Max		
2019	Walk With Me (谢谢你出现在我的行程里)	Wu Weikang		
2019	The Good Fight (致胜出击)	Xie Zhengbin		
2020	Titoudao - Inspired by the True Story of a Wayang Star	Gwee Seng		
2022	Sisters Stand Tall (快跑吧，丽娇！)	Yang Liwen		
2022	Third Rail	John Ho		
2023	Silent Walls	Zheng Haojie		
2023	Whatever Will Be, Will Be	Lin Guangjian	Dialect series	
2024	Born to Shine	Yi Ge		
2025	Fixing Fate	Inspector Ang		

=== Film ===
Year	Title	Role	Notes	Ref.
2011	Already Famous	DW's father		
2019	When Ghost Meets Zombie	Xiao Liang		
2026	Will You Still Be My Friend			

==== As director ====
Year	Title	Role	Notes	Ref.
2025	What Day Is It? (A Singapore Dementia Story)			

== Theatre ==
Year	Title	Role	Ref
2015	December Rains	Zhou Yingxiong	

== Awards and nominations ==
Organisation	Year	Award	Nominated work	Result	Ref.
Asian Academy Creative Awards	2023	Best Actor in a Leading Role (Singapore)	Third Rail	Won	
Star Awards	2009	Best Newcomer	—N/a	Nominated	
Star Awards	2011	Best Supporting Actor	Precious Babes	Nominated	
Star Awards	2012	Best Actor	Code of Honour	Nominated	
Star Awards	2016	Best Supporting Actor	The Journey: Our Homeland	Nominated	
Star Awards	2017	Best Actor	If Only I Could	Nominated	
Star Awards	2017	Best Supporting Actor	Hero	Nominated	
Star Awards	2017	Top 10 Most Popular Male Artistes	—N/a	Nominated	
Star Awards	2018	Top 10 Most Popular Male Artistes	—N/a	Nominated	
Star Awards	2019	Best Supporting Actor	My Agent Is A Hero	Nominated	
Star Awards	2019	Top 10 Most Popular Male Artistes	—N/a	Nominated	
Star Awards	2023	Best Supporting Actor	Sisters Stand Tall	Nominated	
Star Awards	2024	Best Actor	Silent Walls	Nominated	
Star Awards	2024	Best Supporting Actor	Whatever Will Be, Will Be	Nominated	
Star Awards	2024	Top 10 Most Popular Male Artistes	—N/a	Nominated	
Star Awards	2025	Best Actor	Born to Shine	Nominated	
Star Awards	2025	Top 10 Most Popular Male Artistes	—N/a	Nominated	
Star Awards	2026	Best Supporting Actor	Fixing Fate	Nominated	
Star Awards	2026	Most Hated Villian	Fixing Fate	Nominated	
