= Star Awards 2012 =

Singaporean television awards

Star Awards 2012 红星大奖2012
- Date: 22 April 2012 - Show 1; 29 April 2012 - Show 2
- Location: Show 1: MediaCorp TV Theatre; Walk of Fame, Show 2 and Post-show: Marina Bay Sands
- Country: Singapore
- Hosted by: Show 1: Dasmond Koh; Michelle Chia; Lee Teng; Vivian Lai; Walk of Fame: Lee Teng; Bowie Tsang; Guo Liang; Kate Pang; Dasmond Koh; Dennis Chew; Show 2: Bowie Tsang; Guo Liang

Highlights
- Most awards: Drama: A Tale of 2 Cities; Love Thy Neighbour; On the Fringe (3 each); Variety/Info-ed: Renaissance (2)
- Most nominations: Drama: Devotion; On the Fringe (12 each); Variety/Info-ed: Renaissance; Rail Thrill (4 each)
- Best Drama: On the Fringe
- Best Variety Show: Renaissance
- All-time Favourite Artiste: Tay Ping Hui
- Website: "Official website". Archived from the original on 20 February 2012.

Television/radio coverage
- Network: Channel 8 Channel U
- Runtime: 180 mins (both presentations); 60 mins (Walk of Fame and Post-show)

Star Awards 2012 (Chinese: 红星大奖 2012) was a double television award ceremony held in Singapore. It is part of the annual Star Awards organised by MediaCorp for the two free-to-air channels, MediaCorp Channel 8 and MediaCorp Channel U. Star Awards 2012 was live broadcast on Channel 8, on 22 and 29 April 2012, and the Post-Show party on Channel U after the broadcast of the second award ceremony.

Similar to the preceding ceremonies since 2010, the ceremony was split into two separate shows. The first show, titled 光辉大赏 (lit. Glorious Showcase), which focused on Professional and technical awards (which was given out to backstage crew and scriptwriters) as well as showcasing various drama skits to commemorate the 30th Anniversary of Chinese Drama Serials. The second show, titled 颁奖礼 (lit. Award Showcase), was held at the Grand Ballroom in Marina Bay Sands, which focused on main category awards honoring the television series of 2011–12. The first show were hosted by entertainment artistes Dasmond Koh, Michelle Chia, Lee Teng and Vivian Lai, while the second show were hosted by Guo Liang and Taiwanese singer-actress Bowie Tsang.

A Tale of 2 Cities, Love Thy Neighbour and the 2011's remake of the 1987's drama On the Fringe, the latter tying with Devotion for having the most nominations with 12, were tied with the most wins for the ceremony with three for all three series; A Tale of 2 Cities won Favourite Female Character Award on Show 1, and Best Actress and Best Newcomer on Show 2; Love Thy Neighbour won Young Talent and Top Rated Drama Programme awards in Show 1 and Best Supporting Actress in Show 2; the remake won Best Screenplay and Best Drama Editing on Show 1, and Best Drama Serial on Show 2, marking the first television remake to win the award. 20 programs winning at least one award (10 dramas, 10 variety/info-ed) was the largest representation for the number of winning programs in Star Awards history.

== Programme details ==
Date	Shows	Time	Channel	Venue
22 April 2012	Star Awards 2012 Show 1	7:00pm to 10:00pm	MediaCorp Channel 8	MediaCorp TV Theatre
29 April 2012	Star Awards 2012 Walk of Fame	5:30pm to 6:30pm	MediaCorp Channel 8	Marina Bay Sands
29 April 2012	Star Awards 2012 Show 2	7:00pm to 10:00pm	MediaCorp Channel 8 Astro AEC	Marina Bay Sands Sands Grand Ballroom
29 April 2012	Star Awards 2012 Post Show Party	10:00pm to 11:00pm	MediaCorp Channel U	Marina Bay Sands

== Winners and nominees ==
Unless otherwise stated, the winners are listed first, highlighted in boldface.

=== Show 1 ===
==== Main awards ====
**Young Talent Award**: **Tan Jun Sheng – Love Thy Neighbour as 戴鼎新**; Dong Lu Ying – Devotion as 姗姗; Justin Peng – On the Fringe; Oh Ling En 胡菱恩) – Devotion as 许思雯; Yong Joe Yan – Devotion as 小阿娣	**Best Theme Song**: **Kit Chan – Devotion –《倔强》**; Mavis Hee – A Song to Remember – 《星洲之夜》; Wei En – Kampong Ties – 《甘榜情缘》; Anthony Neely – Secrets For Sale – 《缠斗》; Anthony Neely – The Oath – 《救命》
**Best Director**: **Chong Liung Man – C.L.I.F. (Episode 20)**; Kok Tzyy Haw – Kampong Ties (Episode 9); Leong Lye Lin – A Song to Remember (Episode 13); Loo Yin Kam – A Tale of 2 Cities (Episode 14); Loo Yin Kam – Devotion (Episode 1)	**Best Screenplay**: **Ang Eng Tee – On the Fringe (Episode16)**; **Chen Sew Khoon and Lau Chin Poon – The In-laws (Episode 11)**; Paul Yuen and Tang Yeow – A Tale of 2 Cities (Episode 1); Koh Teng Liang – Kampong Ties (Episode 10); Lim Gim Lan, Lau Chin Poon and Winnie Wong – Love Thy Neighbour (Episode 9)
**Best Variety Producer**: **Elaine See – Mission Possible**; Alfred Yeo – It's a Small World 2; Gan Bee Khim – Renaissance; Khow Hwai Teng – Tongue Twister; Tay Lay Tin – Rail Thrill	**Best Variety Research Writer**: **Sheffie Liang – Rail Thrill**; Hon Sher Ee – Food Source 2; Lin Shih Han – HDB Tai Tai 3; Ng Jin Puay – Tongue Twister; Ng Sei Fong – Chef Apprentice
**Best Programme Promo**: **Renaissance – Single Spot**; Adventures of Chris – Campaign, 3 Spots; Follow Me – Single Spot; Secrets For Sale – Campaign, 3 Spots; Unriddle 2 – Campaign, 3 Spots	**Best Drama Cameraman**: **Tommy Lee – A Song to Remember**; Lim Hap Choon – On the Fringe; Liu Wing Chung – C.L.I.F.; Soh Kok Leong – A Tale of 2 Cities; Tommy Lee – Devotion
**Best Drama Set Design**: **Chen Jiagu – Bountiful Blessings**; Chen Jiagu – The In-Laws; Ho Hock Choon – A Song to Remember; Oh Hock Leong – C.L.I.F.; Wong Lab Seng – Devotion	**Best Drama Editing**: **Teo Pit Hong Joyce – On the Fringe**; Koh Kah Yen – A Song to Remember; Lai Chun Kwong – Love Thy Neighbour; Lee Beng Hui Steven – C.L.I.F.; Poon Yiu Tung – Devotion
**Best News Story**: **Evelyn Lam Li Ting – "Nightingale Nursing Home"**; Ng Puay Leng – "Bird Nuisance"; Lip Kwok Wai – "Legal Debt Collection Business"; Hu Jielan – "Oil Theft"; Ng Lian Cheong – "Trapped on Bus for Two Hours"
**Best Current Affairs Story**: **Ng Toh Heong and Chun Guek Lay – Focus – "1911 Chinese Revolution - Sun Yat Sen and Singapore"**; Eugene Lim and Lynne Chee – Frontline – "Legal Loansharks (Part 1)" & "The Debtors' Plight" (Part 2); Pang Kia Nian – Money Week – Thailand Floods – "Impact on Local Businesses"; Pang Kia Nian, Eg Yik Fan and Lim Nghee Huat – Money Week – "Japan Quake Caused Ripples in the Singapore stock market" & "Japan Quake Affects Manufacturing Processes"; Yap Li Ling and Sim Boon Siang – Frontline – "The Case of the 4 Missing Tons of Donated Goods"

==== Awards eligible for voting ====
Online voting for the following four awards ended on 22 April at 8.30pm, while the awards ceremony was being held.

**Favourite Male Character Award**: **Elvin Ng – C.L.I.F. as Zhang Guixiang**; Tay Ping Hui – Bountiful Blessings as Xie Donghai; Ian Fang – On the Fringe as Jason; Edwin Goh – On the Fringe as Yao Zhiyong; Christopher Lee – The Oath as Wu Guo'en	**Favourite Female Character Award**: **Rui En – A Tale of 2 Cities as Zhang Yale**; Cynthia Wang – Devotion as Lin Shan Shan; Kimberly Chia – On The Fringe as Lin Yaxuan; Jesseca Liu – The Oath as Yang Minfei; Ann Kok – Kampong Ties as Feng Yueman
**Favourite On-screen Couple Award**: **Rui En and Elvin Ng – Code of Honour**; Joanne Peh and Qi Yuwu – C.L.I.F.; Li Nanxing and Fann Wong – On the Fringe; Rui En and Pierre Png – The In-Laws; Jesseca Liu and Christopher Lee – The Oath	**Favourite Variety Host Award**: **Bryan Wong**; Fann Wong; Mark Lee; Pornsak; Vivian Lai
**Systema Charming Smile Award**: **Elvin Ng**; Joanne Peh; Pornsak; Paige Chua; Romeo Tan

==== Other awards ====
===== Rocket award =====
**Rocket Award**	**Desmond Tan**

===== Viewership awards =====
**Top Rated Drama Serial 2011**	**Love Thy Neighbour**
**Top Rated Variety Series 2011**	**Food Source 2**

=== Show 2 ===
==== Main awards ====
**Best Drama Serial**: **On The Fringe**; A Song to Remember; C.L.I.F.; Kampong Ties; Secrets For Sale	**Best Variety Programme**: **Renaissance**; Food Source 2; Going Home 2; Mission Possible; Rail Thrill
**Best Variety Special**: **Star Awards 2011 (Show 1)**; ComChest TrueHearts 2011; Lunar New Year's Eve Special 2011; Star Awards 2011 (Show 2); The SPD Charity Show 2011	**Best Info-ed Programme**: **Tuesday Report 2011: Applaud to Life**; Behind Every Job 2; Culture In A Bowl; Daddy 101; Tuesday Report 2011: A Taste of Life
**Best Actor**: **Tay Ping Hui – Bountiful Blessings as Xie Donghai**; Andie Chen – Code of Honour as Ou Jianfeng; Christopher Lee – The Oath as Wu Guo'en; Qi Yuwu – C.L.I.F. as Tang Yew Jia; Zheng Geping – Kampong Ties as Zeng You Bao	**Best Actress**: **Joanne Peh – A Tale of 2 Cities as Pan Leyao**; Ann Kok – Bountiful Blessings as Liang Pinhong; Rui En – A Tale of 2 Cities as Zhang Yale; Fann Wong – On the Fringe as Liu Jiali; Zoe Tay – Devotion as Liu Zhaodi
**Best Supporting Actor**: **Chen Shucheng – The Oath as Wu Zhi Xiong**; Chen Hanwei – A Song to Remember as Xu Kun; Cavin Soh – Love Thy Neighbour as Dai Deliang; Rayson Tan – A Song to Remember as Black Snake; Brandon Wong – Love Thy Neighbour as Crazy Knife	**Best Supporting Actress**: **Vivian Lai – Love Thy Neighbour as Shan Shan**; Yvonne Lim – The Oath as Yuen Wen; Ng Hui – Kampong Ties as Han Xiuyuan; Kate Pang – On the Fringe as Zhong Ling; Constance Song – On the Fringe as Nancy
**Best Newcomer Award**: **Kate Pang – A Tale of 2 Cities as Lin Le**; Adeline Lim – Devotion as Wufeng; Sora Ma – Love Thy Neighbour as Dai Peijun; Romeo Tan – C.L.I.F. as Koh Wen Xiong; Jeffrey Xu – Devotion as Zheng Yimin	**Best Variety Show Host**: **Mark Lee – It's a Small World II**; Lee Teng – Rail Thrill; Kym Ng – Chef Apprentice; Pornsak – Food Source 2; Bryan Wong – Renaissance
**Best Info-ed Programme Host**: **Lee Teng – Let's Talk 2**; Christopher Lee – The Adventures of Chris; Mark Lee – Behind Every Job 2; Guo Liang – Legendary Cuisines II; Bryan Wong – Behind Every Job 2	**Best News Presenter**: **Tung Soo Hua**; **Zhang Haijie**; Lin Chi Yuan; Wang Zheng; Zhao Wenbei
**Best Current Affairs Presenter**: **Chun Guek Lay – Focus**; **Youyi – Good Morning Singapore!**; Desmond Lim Soo Guan – Good Morning Singapore!; Qi Qi – Good Morning Singapore!; Tung Soo Hua – Money Week

==== All Time Favourite Artiste ====
This award is a special achievement award given out to a veteran artiste(s) who have achieved a maximum of 10 popularity awards over 10 years. The award will not be presented in 2013, as there are no recipients with ten Top 10 Most Popular Male or Female Artistes award wins to allow the award to be presented that year.

**All Time Favourite Artiste**	**Tay Ping Hui**	2000 | 2001 | 2003 | 2004 | 2005 | 2006 | 2007 | 2009 | 2010 | 2011

==== Top 10 awards ====
The Top 10 Most Popular Male Artists and Top 10 Most Popular Female Artists was decided by a public vote. In a first in Star Awards history, the online voting was introduced and in addition to the traditional telepoll voting, both voting methods now accounted to a 50% weightage towards the overall final result. The voting line closed on 29 April at 9pm while the Show 2 was broadcast.

Note	Description
	Made it to top 10 in the week / Fall under the Top n category.
n	How many of this awards the awardee got.
**10**	To be awarded the All-Time Favourite Artiste in the next Star Awards.

Stage:	**Week 1**	**Week 2**	**Week 3**	**Week 4**	**Week 5**	**Week 6**	**Show 2**		
Stage:	**Week 1**	**Week 2**	**Week 3**	**Week 4**	**Week 5**	**Week 6**	Top 18	Top 16	Top 10
Artist	Results								
**Top 10 Most Popular Male Artists**
**Qi Yuwu**									8
Dai Yang Tian									
Chen Shucheng									
**Dennis Chew**									3
Rayson Tan									
Zhu Houren									
**Zheng Geping**									4
**Bryan Wong**									9
Huang Wenyong									
Richard Low									
Gurmit Singh									
**Pierre Png**									1
**Dasmond Koh**									6
Guo Liang									
Pornsak									
**Elvin Ng**									6
**Zhang Yao Dong**									4
Terence Cao									
**Ben Yeo**									1
**Chen Hanwei**									9
**Top 10 Most Popular Female Artistes**
Priscelia Chan									
**Cynthia Koh**									2
**Rui En**									7
Aileen Tan									
**Yvonne Lim**									5
**Ann Kok**									7
Pan Lingling									
**Rebecca Lim**									1
Michelle Chia									
Kate Pang									
**Jeanette Aw**									8
Belinda Lee									
**Paige Chua**									1
Zhou Ying									
Christina Lim									
**Vivian Lai**									8
Hong Huifang									
**Kym Ng**									5
Michelle Chong									
**Joanne Peh**									6

== Presenters and performers ==
The following individuals presented awards or performed musical numbers.

=== Show 1 ===
Artistes / Special guests	Associated Programme	Presented / Performed
Selected child actors	Good Morning, Sir! 早安老师	Performed 《早安老师》 and welcoming Presenter Chen Liping
Chen Liping 陈莉萍	Good Morning, Sir! 早安老师	Presenter for the award for Young Talent Award
Jeanette Aw 欧萱; Dai Xiangyu 戴阳天; Yao Wenlong 姚彣隆	The Little Nyonya 小娘惹	Presenters for the award for Best Drama Set Design
Chen Xiuhuan 陈秀环; Wang Yuqing 王昱清	Star Maiden 飞越银河	Presenters for the award for Best Drama Cameraman
Liu Xuefang 刘雪芳	Youth 123 青春123	Performed 《飞越在梦中》 / Presenter for the award for Best Theme Music (with Teng)
Maggie Teng 邓妙华	Youth 123 青春123	Performed 《泪雨后的彩虹》 / Presenter for the award for Best Theme Music (with Liu)
Vincent Ng 翁清海; Jacelyn Tay 郑秀珍	Legend of the Eight Immortals 东游记	Presenters for the awards for Best Drama Editing and Best Programme Promo
Baey Yam Keng 马炎庆; Huang Biren 黄碧仁	—N/a	Presenters for the awards for Best News Story and Best Current Affairs Story
Chew Chor Meng 周初明; Huang Wenyong 黄文永; Quan Yi Fong 权怡凤	Don't Worry Be Happy 敢敢做个开心人	Presenters for the award for Best Screenplay
Selected Performers	On the Fringe 边缘少年	Performed 《边缘少年》
Yang Libing 杨莉冰; Zheng Wanling 郑婉龄	On the Fringe 边缘少年	Presenters for the award for Best Director
Sharon Au 欧菁仙; Kym Ng 鐘琴; Bryan Wong 王禄江	City Beat 城人杂志	Presenters for the award for Best Variety Research Writer
Samuel Chong 张永权 周如珠	—N/a	Presenters for the award for Best Variety Producer
Dennis Chew 周崇庆; Guo Liang 郭亮; Vivian Lai 赖怡伶; Lee Teng 李腾; Quan Yi Fong 权怡凤	—N/a	Presented comedic skit 《三个片厂一出剧》
CEO and Director, Lion Corporation (Singapore); Gina Tay	—N/a	Gave out the award for Systema Charming Smile Award
MediaCorp Chairman; Teo Ming Kian 张铭坚	—N/a	Gave out awards for Top Rated Variety Series and Top Rated Drama Series
Moses Lim 林益民; Jack Neo 梁志强	Comedy Night 搞笑行動	Presenters for the award for Favourite Variety Show Host
Xiang Yun 向云	Return of the Prince 丝路谜城	Presenter for the award for Favourite Female Character Award
Chen Hanwei 陈汉玮; Zoe Tay 郑惠玉	—N/a	Presenters for the award Favourite Male Character Award
Christopher Lee 李铭顺; Fann Wong 范文芳	The Return of the Condor Heroes 神雕侠侣	Presenters for the award for Favourite On-screen Couple Award
Parliamentary Secretary, Ministry of Trade & Industry and National Development; Lee Yi Shyan 李奕贤	—N/a	Gave out the award for Rocket Award

=== Show 2 ===
Artistes / Special guests	Presented / Performed
Alien Huang 黄鸿升; Kingone Wang 王传一	Presenter for the awards for Best Info-ed Programme and Best Info-ed Programme Host
Jennifer Tse 谢婷婷; Xia Yu 夏雨	Presenter for the award for Best Newcomer
Woo Keng Choong 胡敬中; Yin Naijing 尹乃箐	Presenters for the awards for Best Current Affairs Presenter and Best News Presenter
Norman Chen 陈冠霖; June Tsai 六月	Presenters for the awards for Best Supporting Actor and Best Supporting Actress
Angus Kuo 郭彦甫; Antony Kuo 郭彦均	Presenters for the awards for Best Variety Programme, Best Variety Show Host and Best Variety Special
Pauline Lan 蓝心湄	Presenter for the award for Best Variety Special
Lin Gengxin 林更新; Annie Liu 刘心悠	Presenters for the award for Best Drama Serial
Minister of Education; Heng Swee Keat 王瑞杰	Gave out the award for All-Time Favourite Artiste
Jay Park	Performed "Nothing On You"/"Know Your Name"/"Girlfriend"
Francis Ng 吴镇宇; Cecilia Yip 叶童	Presenters for the award for Best Actor and Best Actress
Lan Cheng-lung 蓝正龙; Tien Hsin 天心	Presenters for the award for Top 10 Most Popular Male Artistes
Lan Cheng-lung 蓝正龙; Pauline Lan 蓝心湄	Presenters for the award for Top 10 Most Popular Female Artistes

== Summary of nominations and awards (by programme genre) ==
=== Most nominations ===
Programs that received multiple nominations are listed below, by number of nominations per work:

Drama Series	Nominations
Devotion 阿娣	12
On the Fringe 边缘父子	12
C.L.I.F. 警徽天职	9
Love Thy Neighbour 四个门牌一个梦	8
A Song to Remember 星洲之夜	8
Kampong Ties 甘榜情	7
The Oath 行医	7
A Tale of 2 Cities 乐在双城	7
Bountiful Blessings 万福楼	4
Secrets For Sale 拍。卖	3
The In-laws 麻婆斗妇	3
Code of Honour 正义武官	1

Variety/Info-ed	Nominations
Renaissance 旧欢. 心爱	4
Rail Thrill 铁路次文化	4
Behind Every Job 2 美差事 苦差事 II	3
Good Morning Singapore! 早安您好!	3
Money Week 财经追击	3
Mission Possible 小村大任务	2
It's a Small World 2 国记交意所2	2
Tongue Twister 巧言妙语	2
Star Awards 2011 红星大奖2011	2
Food Source 2 食在好源头2	2
Chef Apprentice 名厨实习生	2
Adventures of Chris 阿顺历险记	2
Tuesday Report 星期二特写	2
Focus 焦点	2
Frontline 前线追踪	2
Let's Talk 2 你在囧什么?! 2	1
HDB Tai Tai 3 HDB 太太3	1
Follow Me 跟随我	1
Lunar New Year's Eve Special 2011 金兔呈祥喜迎春	1
ComChest TrueHearts 2011 公益献爱心	1
The SPD Charity Show 2011 真情无障碍	1
Culture In A Bowl 吃出一碗文化	1
Daddy 101 爸爸秘笈	1
Legendary Cuisines II 传说中的料理 II	1

=== Most wins ===
Drama Series	Wins
A Tale of 2 Cities 乐在双城	3
Love Thy Neighbour 四个门牌一个梦	3
On the Fringe 边缘父子	3
Bountiful Blessings 万福楼	2
C.L.I.F. 警徽天职	2
A Song to Remember 星洲之夜	1
Code of Honour 正义武官	1
Devotion 阿娣	1
The In-laws 麻婆斗妇	1
The Oath 行医	1

Variety/Info-ed	Wins
Focus 焦点	2
Renaissance 旧欢. 心爱	2
Food Source 2 食在好源头2	1
Good Morning Singapore! 早安您好!	1
It's a Small World 2 国记交意所2	1
Let's Talk 2 你在囧什么?! 2	1
Mission Possible 小村大任务	1
Rail Thrill 铁路次文化	1
Star Awards 2011 红星大奖2011	1
Tuesday Report 星期二特写	1

== Star Awards 2012 – Blazing The Trail ==
Star Awards 2012
- Also known as: Star Awards 2012 – Blazing The Trail
- 红星大奖2012 - 星语录
- Genre: Variety Special
- Presented by: Dasmond Koh
- Country of origin: Singapore
- Original language: Mandarin
- No. of episodes: 4

Production
- Running time: approx. 15 mins

Original release
- Network: MediaCorp Channel 8
- Release: 25 March – 15 April 2012

Related
- Star Awards

Star Awards 2012 - Blazing The Trail was a four 15-minute episode series premiered on 25 March 2012 from 10:30pm every Sundays. The series provided details of the award nominees of Star Awards 2012, leading up to the ceremony airing on 22 April.

== Trivia ==
=== Consecutive nominees and awardees, firsts in Top 10 ===
- The nominees for the "Best Current Affairs Presenter" award are the same throughout three consecutive years since 2010; while the nominees for the "Best News Presenter" award are the same from last year. Each award was received by two awardees this year.
- Mark Lee received the Best Variety Show Host award after not winning one in 2011.
- The public voting awards for drama categories, Most Favourite Female Character and Most Favourite Male Character, were respectively won by Rui En and Elvin Ng for the second straight year.
  - Additionally, both aforementioned artistes went on to win the Most Favourite Onscreen Couple award.
  - The latter, Ng, won his second consecutive Systema Charming Smile Award.
- Pierre Png, Ben Yeo, Rebecca Lim and Paige Chua won the Top 10 Most Popular Artistes award for the first time, while Quan Yi Fong not being nominated for the award for the first time.
  - Cynthia Koh's second Top 10 win ended a drought of not winning a Top 10, with the last win happened in 1997.

=== Addition and changes of awards categories ===
- This year's Star Awards reintroduced the "Best Newcomer" award, which was last presented in 2009.
- The "Most Favourite Variety Onscreen Partner" was changed to "Most Favourite Variety Show Host", which reduced the number of nominees by half, this year.

=== 30th drama anniversary ===
- As part of the MediaCorp Channel 8's anniversary special celebrating 30 years of Chinese language drama in Singapore, past SBC/TCS/MediaCorp stars such as Chen Xiuhuan, Yang Libing, Moses Lim, Jack Neo, Jacelyn Tay, Vincent Ng, Sharon Au and Huang Biren were invited as special guests and awards presenters.

=== Other trivia ===
- Footage of Tay Ping Hui and Bryan Wong winning the Best Actor and Favourite Host respectively were seen in a skit in Star Awards 2015 Show 1.
- Footage of Dennis Chew winning the Top 10 Most Popular Male Artistes was seen in a skit in Star Awards 2015 Show 1, except that he jumped for a total of four times in the footage instead of two.

== Accolades ==
Organisation	Year	Category	Nominee	Representative work	Result	Ref
Star Awards	2013	Best Variety Research Writer	Lam Yen Fong 蓝燕芳	Star Awards 2012 (Show 1)	Won	
Star Awards	2013	Best Variety Special 最佳综艺特备节目	—N/a	Star Awards 2012 (Show 1)	Won	
Star Awards	2013	Best Variety Special 最佳综艺特备节目	—N/a	Star Awards 2012 (Show 2) 红星大奖2012 颁奖礼	Nominated	

== See also ==
- List of programmes broadcast by Mediacorp Channel 8
- MediaCorp Channel 8
- MediaCorp Channel U
- Star Awards
