= Kate Pang =

Singaporean-Taiwanese actress and host

- 龐蕾馨
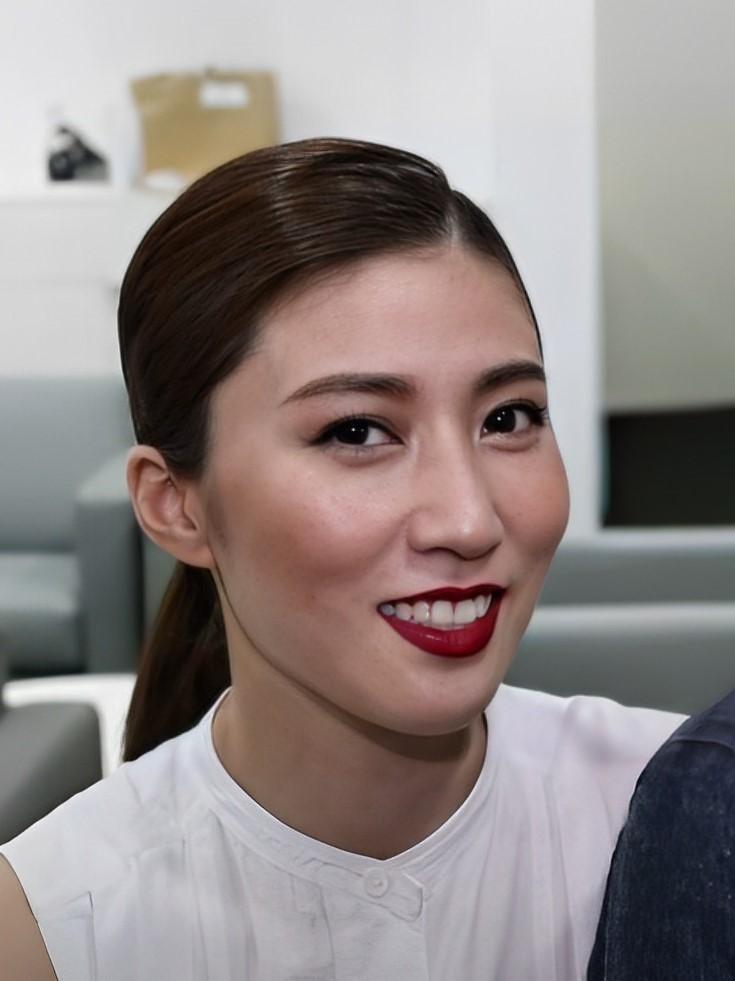
- Pang in April 2017
- Born: Pang Xin-yi; 11 March 1983 (age 43); Taiwan
- Other name: Pang Leixin
- Occupations: Actress; television host; businesswoman
- Years active: 2008–present
- Spouse: Andie Chen (m. 2013)
- Children: 2

Chinese name
- Traditional Chinese: 龐蕾馨
- Simplified Chinese: 庞蕾馨
- Hanyu Pinyin: Páng Léixīn

Birth name
- Traditional Chinese: 龐心怡
- Simplified Chinese: 庞心怡
- Hanyu Pinyin: Páng Xīnyí

Kate Pang (born 11 March 1983) is a Taiwanese actress, television host and businesswoman based in Singapore. She was a full-time Mediacorp artiste till 31 October 2017 but continues to film on an ad hoc basis.

== Career ==
Pang was a model in Taiwan before going into acting. She impressed during her audition and was given a contract with Mediacorp. Since giving birth to her son in 2014, she has put her career on hold.

Pang is also brand ambassador of Dyson Vacuum Machine (2015), Maxi-Cash: Le Gold (2016) and Maggi Oat Mee (2017).

Pang left Mediacorp on 31 October 2017 with her husband, Andie Chen, but still continues to act and host.

== Ventures ==
Pang and Chen set up a social media company in 2016 by the name of Kandie Network to share their experiences of bringing up a family. The website's name was changed to Kandie Media in 2017. Kandie Media currently includes Facebook, Instagram and YouTube via the name Kandie Family.

In May 2021, Pang and host Marcus Chin opened a Sichuan restaurant named Tian Tian You Yu at 111 Somerset, and later a second outlet located along East Coast Road area.

== Personal life ==
Born Pang Xin-yi (庞心怡), she legally changed her name to Kate Pang Lei-xin (庞蕾馨).

Pang's parents divorced when she was two and was raised by her grandmother. She subsequently moved to Taipei to study and stayed with her cousin.

Pang is married to actor Andie Chen, her co-star from Joys of Life and Break Free. They dated secretly after first meeting on the set of Joy of Life and married in November 2013. Their son Aden was born in 2014. They were expecting their second child in early 2015 but Pang suffered a miscarriage in April. The couple also have a daughter, Avery, who was born in 2016.

== Filmography ==
=== Television series ===
Year	Title	Role	Notes	Ref.
2011	A Tale of 2 Cities	Lin Le		
2011	Devotion	Xu Siwen		
2011	On the Fringe	Zhong Ling		
2011	The Oath	Huang Siyun		
2012	Double Bonus	Tian Xin		
2012	Joys of Life	Sun Lianjing		
2012	Break Free	Ni Qingqing		
2013	Love At Risk	Liao Meihao		
2013	Start-Up! 创！	Doobie		
2014	Entangled 日落洞	Pauline		
2018	118 Reunion 要要发大团圆	Deng Baoli		
2018	My Agent Is A Hero 流浪经纪	Jean		
2018	Fifty & Fabulous 五零高手	Zhuang Peiru		
2018	Love At Cavenagh Bridge 加文纳桥的约定	Amy Xiaoya		
2019	My Agent Is A Hero 2 流浪经纪2	Jean		
2019	I'm Madam 女友变身记	Sgt Ong		
2025	I Believe I Can Fly 青春小鸟	Liu Xiangxiang		
2025	Something Before And After 整形過後	Amy		

=== Film ===
Year	Title	Role	Notes	Ref.
2019	When Ghost Meets Zombie	Joe		
2026	Will You Still Be My Friend			

=== Variety show hosting ===
Year	Title	Notes	Ref.
2012	My Fair Ladies (小女人大世界)		
2013	Star Awards 2013 Red Carpet Show (2013红星大奖星光大道)		
2013	Star Awards 2013 Post-Awards Show (2013红星大奖庆功宴)		
2015	Face off		
2015	Hey Gorgeous 2015 (校园美魔王2015)		
2015	Star Awards 2015 Red Carpet Show (2015红星大奖星光大道)		
2016	Mars Vs Venus S2 (金星火星大不同2)		
2017	Star Awards 2017 Red Carpet Show (2017红星大奖星光大道)		
2017	Little Maestros (小当家)		
2018	By My Side (谢谢你不离不弃)		

== Awards and nominations ==
Year	Ceremony	Award	Nominated work	Result	Ref
2012	Star Awards	Best Newcomer	A Tale Of 2 Cities	Won	
2012	Star Awards	Best Supporting Actress	On The Fringe 2	Nominated	
2012	Star Awards	Top 10 Most Popular Female Artistes	—N/a	Nominated	
2013	Star Awards	Best Supporting Actress	Joys of Life	Nominated	
2013	Star Awards	Favourite Host	—N/a	Nominated	
2014	Star Awards	Top 10 Most Popular Female Artistes	—N/a	Nominated	
2014	Star Awards	Star Awards for Most Popular Regional Artiste (Indonesia)	—N/a	Nominated	
2015	Star Awards	BottomSlim Sexiest Legs Awards	—N/a	Nominated	
2015	Star Awards	Tokyo Bust Express Sexy Babe Award	—N/a	Nominated	
2016	Star Awards	Best Programme Host	Face Off!	Nominated	
2016	Star Awards	Top 10 Most Popular Female Artistes	—N/a	Nominated	
2017	Star Awards	Top 10 Most Popular Female Artistes	—N/a	Nominated	
