= The Oath (Singaporean TV series) =

2011 Singaporean Chinese television series

- 行医
- Genre: Medical drama
- Created by: Ho Hee Ann 何启安
- Written by: Wawa Creative Team 哇哇创作组
- Starring: Christopher Lee; Jesseca Liu; Ix Shen; Ann Kok; Zhang Zhenxuan; Kate Pang; Yvonne Lim
- Opening theme: 《救命》 by Anthony Neely
- Ending theme: 《还是要幸福》 by Hebe Tien 《海枯石烂》by Olivia Ong 《最初的回忆》 by Da Feng Chui
- Country of origin: Singapore
- Original language: Mandarin
- No. of episodes: 20

Production
- Producer: Molby Low 刘健财
- Running time: 45 minutes (approx.)
- Production company: Wawa Pictures

Original release
- Network: Mediacorp Channel 8 (Singapore)
- Release: 25 October – 21 November 2011

Related
- Love Thy Neighbour; A Song to Remember

The Oath (行医) is a medical drama produced by Wawa Pictures. It stars Christopher Lee, Jesseca Liu, Ix Shen, Ann Kok, Zhang Zhenxuan, Yvonne Lim & Kate Pang as casts of the series. The drama follows a Chinese physician and a Western doctor on a complex medical case.

The series premiered in Singapore on 25 October 2011 on Mediacorp Channel 8. This drama is the first Wawa Pictures drama to be broadcast on Channel 8.

The series is available for streaming on Netflix.

== Plot ==
Two medical doctors Wu Guo En and Yang Minfei with opposite approaches to treating patients clash on the job and must learn to trust each other's expertise, allowing love to bloom.

== Cast ==
- Christopher Lee as Wu Guo En
- Jesseca Liu as Yang Minfei
- Ix Shen as Guan Dewei
- Ann Kok as Ye Zhiyi
- Yvonne Lim as Xu Yunwen
- Zhang Zhenxuan as Guo Jianzhong
- Kate Pang as Huang Siyun
- Richard Low as Yang Liming
- Chen Shucheng as Wu Zhixiong
- Lin Liyun as Professor Zheng
- Tang Lingyi as Lin Xi
- Bernard Tan as David

== Production ==
Ian Fang was a production assistant for the drama.

== Soundtrack ==
The theme song is "救命" by American-Taiwanese singer Anthony Neely in his latest album Wake Up. Other side tracks include "海枯石烂" by Olivia Ong and "还是要幸福" by Hebe Tian.

== Accolades ==
| Award | Year | Category | Nominee(s) | Result | Ref |
|---|---|---|---|---|---|
| Star Awards | 2012 | Best Theme Song | "救命" | Nominated | |
| Star Awards | 2012 | Star Awards for Favourite Male Character | Christopher Lee | Nominated | |
| Star Awards | 2012 | Star Awards for Favourite Female Character | Jesseca Liu | Nominated | |
| Star Awards | 2012 | Favourite On-screen Couple 最喜爱银幕情侣 | Christopher Lee and Jesseca Liu | Nominated | |
| Star Awards | 2012 | Best Actor | Christopher Lee | Nominated | |
| Star Awards | 2012 | Best Supporting Actor | Chen Shucheng | Won | |
| Star Awards | 2012 | Best Supporting Actress | Yvonne Lim | Nominated | |

== See also ==
- List of programmes broadcast by MediaCorp Channel 8
