= On the Fringe (2011 TV series) =

Singaporean television series

- 边缘父子
- Genre: Juvenile delinquency
- Written by: Ang Eng Tee 洪荣狄
- Starring: Li Nanxing; Fann Wong; Rui En; Zhang Yaodong
- Ending theme: 谁的珍重 by Deng Bi Yuan 边缘少年 by 姜鄠
- Country of origin: Singapore
- Original language: Mandarin (华语)
- No. of episodes: 20

Production
- Producer: Paul Yuen 袁树伟
- Running time: ≈45 minutes

Original release
- Network: MediaCorp Channel 8
- Release: 2 August – 29 August 2011

Related
- Devotion; Bountiful Blessings; On The Fringe 1987

On the Fringe (simplified Chinese: 边缘父子) is a Singaporean Chinese drama which was telecasted on Singapore's free-to-air channel, MediaCorp Channel 8. The show's main cast were Li Nanxing, Fann Wong, Rui En and Zhang Yaodong. The show which lasted 20 episodes premiered on 2 August 2011 and ended on 29 August 2011. This drama is a remake from the 1987 series of the same name, which also stars Li and features ex-prisoners and similar antiheroes.

== Synopsis ==
Yao Zhiyong and his group of friends are a gang of rebellious teenagers who call themselves the WCS. They regularly get into fights with rival gangs. On one such occasion, Zhiyong and his friends had a close brush with the law when the police were called in. At home, he has been walking the thin line by trying to keep his "extracurricular activities" away from his mother.

Meanwhile, Tian Yibang is nearing the end of his jail sentence and reminisces about his old life. Before going to jail, he had been happily married and had a baby son. He refused to change to his old ways and the police soon caught up with him. His wife later came to prison and told him that she was taking away their son and raise him herself without acknowledging him as the birth father. Heartbroken, Yibang resolves to change his life around.

Yibang is released from prison and tries to find some work. At the same time, Zhiyong has been getting into trouble and by chance, their paths cross. Yibang sees his old self in Zhiyong and attempts to help Zhiyong before he goes on the road of no return. To his shock, he later discovers that Zhiyong is his long-lost biological son. Can Yibang help Zhiyong before it is too late?

== Cast ==
- Li Nanxing as Tian Yibang 田一邦
- Fann Wong as Liu Jiali 刘佳丽, the successor leader of the gang after the gang leader was killed : Fann was initially cast in the role of the gang leader but was unavailable as she expected to act in a film in China. Chen Liping was then cast for the role which she accepted. Chen subsequently declined the role for health reasons and Fann was cast for the role again and had to refuse the acting engagement in China.
- Yao Wenlong as Four-eyed Chicken 四眼鸡
- Brandon Wong as Ah Qing 阿清
- Cansen Goh 吴开深 as Mo Da 莫达
- Rayson Tan as Yao Guo Hua 姚国华
- Pan Lingling as Hua Hua 花花
- Alan Tern as Jack
- Eelyn Kok as Ivy
- Rui En 瑞恩 as Lin Shasha 林莎莎
- Zhang Yaodong as Leo
- Kate Pang as Zhong Ling 鐘玲
- Chen Tianwen as Luo Biao 罗标
- Constance Song as Nancy
- Jeremy Chan as Ah Dang 阿当
- Bryan Chan as Shortie Hong 矮仔洪
- Ian Fang as Jason Liu 刘杰生
- Edwin Goh as Yao Zhiyong 姚志勇
- Kimberly Chia as Ah Ya 阿雅
- Benjamin Heng as Albert
- Gabriel Lee 李正豪 as Ah Dong 阿东
- Elizabeth Lee 李巧儿 as Joey 祖儿
- Phua Yida 潘昱达 as Tomato

== Accolades ==
Year	Ceremony	Award	Nominee(s)	Result	Ref
2012	Star Awards	Young Talent Award	Justin Peng 彭修轩	Nominated	
2012	Star Awards	Best Screenplay	Ang Eng Tee 洪荣狄	Won (tied with The In-laws 麻婆斗妇 )	
2012	Star Awards	Best Drama Cameraman 最佳戏剧摄影	Lim Hap Choon 林合存	Nominated	
2012	Star Awards	Best Drama Editing 最佳戏剧剪辑	Teo Pit Hong Joyce 张必芳	Won	
2012	Star Awards	Favourite Male Character	Ian Fang	Nominated	
2012	Star Awards	Favourite Male Character	Edwin Goh	Nominated	
2012	Star Awards	Favourite Female Character	Kimberly Chia	Nominated	
2012	Star Awards	Favourite Onscreen Couple(Drama)	Li Nanxing / Fann Wong	Nominated	
2012	Star Awards	Best Actress	Fann Wong	Nominated	
2012	Star Awards	Best Supporting Actress	Kate Pang	Nominated	
2012	Star Awards	Best Supporting Actress	Constance Song	Nominated	
2012	Star Awards	Best Drama Serial	—N/a	Won	

Preceded by Breakout; 2010-11	Star Awards for Best Drama Serial; On the Fringe (2011); 2011-12	Succeeded by Pillow Talk; 2012-13
