= Bountiful Blessings =

2011 Singaporean Chinese television series

- 万福楼
- Genre: Fantasy; Romance; Crime
- Starring: Jessica Hsuan; Tay Ping Hui; Thomas Ong; Ann Kok; Yao Wenlong; Jeffrey Xu; Ya Hui; Zhu Houren
- Ending theme: I Believe in You by Hagen Troy 第一次我 by Hagen Troy 我是你的天空 by Hagen Troy
- Country of origin: Singapore
- Original language: Chinese
- No. of episodes: 20

Production
- Running time: approx. 45 minutes

Original release
- Network: MediaCorp Channel 8
- Release: 30 August – 26 September 2011

Bountiful Blessings (simplified Chinese: 万福楼) is a 20-episode fantasy drama serial telecast by MediaCorp Channel 8. It stars Jessica Hsuan, Tay Ping Hui, Thomas Ong, Ann Kok, Yao Wenlong, Jeffrey Xu, Ya Hui & Zhu Houren as the casts of the series. It made its debut on 30 August 2011 and has ended on 26 September 2011. It is screened every weekday night at 9.00pm.

== Cast ==
Cast	Character	Description
Jessica Hsuan	Huang Fuxi	Ding Xiang reborn Erhu's daughter Fuyuan's elder sister Yifei's mother Dafeng's ex-fiancée Chef
Tay Ping Hui	Xie Donghai	Gangster; Calls Fuxi 'Auntie'; In love with Fuxi; Chef
Yao Wenlong	Zhang Dan the Kitchen God	Yifei's father Immortal; Used Donghai's body (episode 6); Reveals his Kitchen God identity Turned into cockroach
Thomas Ong	Tong Dafeng	Fuxi's ex-fiancé In love with Fuxi. Tianqing's elder brother Chef
Ann Kok	Liang Pinhong	Main Villain Flower Spirit; Demon; Can hear people's thoughts Transforms Fuxi's likeness
Zhu Houren	Huang Erhu	Fuxi's and Fuyuan's father Yifei's grandfather
Ya Hui	Tong Tianqing	Dafeng's younger sister
Jeffrey Xu	Huang Fuyuan	Erhu's son Fuxi's younger brother Waiter; Singer
Henry Thia	Prosperity God	Kitchen God's buddy
Hong Huifang	E-jie	Waitress
Romeo Tan	Bang	Chef
Adam Chen	Morning	Flower Spirit; Became tree branches
May Phua	Ying Ying	Donghai's ex-girlfriend, who became his enemy's wife
Ye Shipin	Boss Kaya	Gangster boss
Liang Tian	Uncle Hong	Donghai's master whom he lives with before moving to Fuxi's house
Yuan Shuai	Roy	Already had a family Love cheat Jailed
Louis Wu Luoyi	Qinfeng	Pinhong's ex-lover.

== Soundtrack ==
我是你的天空 by Ocean Ou is Taste of Love's theme song, reused as Fuyuan also sung this song.

== Release ==
This drama would be encored at 5.30pm despite a few episodes having violence, similar to The Family Court and The Score. It was planned for an Unriddle 2 quick encore, which has similar violent scenes, the next weekday after the finale, but however Be Happy would be encored instead.

== Accolades ==
Organisation	Year	Award	Nominee / Work	Result	Ref
Star Awards	2012	Best Drama Set Design	Chen Jiagu	Won	
Star Awards	2012	Favourite Male Character	Tay Ping Hui	Nominated	
Star Awards	2012	Best Actor	Tay Ping Hui	Won	
Star Awards	2012	Best Actress	Ann Kok	Nominated	
