= Unriddle 2 =

Singaporean TV series

- 最火搭档2
- Genre: Police procedural Revenge; Thriller; Action; Vigilance; Crime
- Written by: Phang Kai Yee
- Directed by: Chen Yi You; Loh Woon Woon
- Starring: Rui En; Chen Liping; Tay Ping Hui; Elvin Ng
- Opening theme: Music
- Country of origin: Singapore
- Original language: Chinese
- No. of episodes: 20

Production
- Producer: Paul Yuen
- Running time: approx. 45 minutes

Original release
- Network: MediaCorp Channel 8 NTV7
- Release: 5 March – 30 March 2012

Related
- Unriddle (2010)

Unriddle 2 (Chinese: 最火搭档 2) is a Singaporean Chinese police crime drama which was telecast on Singapore's free-to-air channel, Mediacorp Channel 8. It stars Rui En, Chen Liping, Rebecca Lim, Tay Ping Hui & Elvin Ng as the casts for the second series. This drama serial consists of 20 episodes, and was screened on every weekday night at 9:00 pm. It is a sequel to Unriddle, one of the first sequels in Mediacorp dramas in nearly 10 years. The sequel is also noted for its much darker tone as compared to the first series.

== Cast ==
- Rui En as Hu Xiaoman, reprised her role from the prequel.
- Chen Liping as Lin Zhengyi, reprised her role from the prequel.
- Rebecca Lim as Gao Jieyu, a psychiatrist
- Tay Ping Hui as Zhang Yuze, Xiaoman's supervisor in the CID, reprised his role from the prequel.
- Elvin Ng as Xie Langfeng. Nicknamed "Wolf" (狼), Xie is Xiaoman's colleague and old rival
- Zhou Ying as Zhong Ah Ni, reprised her role from the prequel.
- Joshua Ang as Liu Shisan, reprised his role from the prequel.
- Adeline Lim as Xiao Na
- Oh Ling En as Ah Bi
- Yuan Shuai as Dai Baolun, a new CID officer, and an IT expert.
- Adam Chen as Wu Zhiyun, a CID Officer who graduated with Xiaoman and Langfeng from police academy.
- Sora Ma as Sun Mingwei, a new CID officer
- Xiang Yun as Yang Qiujun, Xiaoman's mother and a lawyer
- Desmond Shen as Asura, Shan Fan (Savage)'s older brother
- Chen Tianwen as Kuroda (Hei Tian), a Japanese

Cast	Role	Description
Zhang Wei	Hong Chao	Da Bao's "Family" Member. He bravely stood up to Asura and was murdered by him.
Wee Kheng Ming	Dylan Cai Zhiming	Villain Birth name Lin Peiyu. Lawyer working at Yang Qiujun's firm. A supposed suitor of Hu Xiaoman. In reality he is a serial killer targeting people who abused their family and children, and chose to woo Xiaoman because her father was a pedophile who sexually assaulted his childhood friend Thomas (Who died back in Season 1). He became a serial killer partly due to allegedly witnessing his father and mother killing each other during a fight when he was a young boy. He eventually managed to kill Hu Guangming, but loses his memory after Xiaoman knocks him out. Gao Jieyu restored his memories along with his childhood memories, and he realized to his horror that he was the one who killed his own father. He confesses that while his main reason for getting near Xiaoman was to kill her father, he fell in love with her and deep in his heart he actually wished Hu Guangming would never return so he would never have to kill him. Jieyu injected an allergic medication to his drip, giving him a seizure. Xiaoman silently watched without alerting the hospital staff, denying him the bell and refusing to press it as he died.
Bernard Tan	Hu Guangming	Xiaoman's Father. He returned in hopes of seeing his daughter and former wife for one last time. Yang Qiujun forgave him although Xiaoman refused to. Knowing Dylan Cai is targeting Hu Guangming, she used her own father as bait. Although she confidently believed that she will be able to apprehend Dylan without getting her father killed, she failed in that aspect.
Romeo Tan	Fu Hongbo	Villain Fu Lelin's Brother. Wheelchair-using due to his step-father "Big Little Eyes" physical abuse when he was still a child. Possibly due to Jieyu's manipulations he and his sister believed their sufferings were due to them having been kidnappers of their parents in their previous lives and now they are atoning for their past sins. He had actually been practicing to walk for months, and tried to protect Lelin by making a false confession that he murdered Rookie and Monkey for raping his sister. Held Jieyu hostage before being shot dead by Xiaoman.
Julie Tan	Fu Lelin	Villain; She was mute and partially deaf due to her step-father "Big Little Eyes" physical abuse when she was still a child. She was the one who accidentally killed her baby sister. She developed a split personality soon after, in which she is able to talk in her alternate self. She was timid and reserved in her outward appearance, but violent and capricious in her alternate self. It was her alternate personality that led her to kill Ah Ni for being close to her brother Fu Hongbo, and was co-planners with Gao Jieyu in systematically tracking down and killing the four kidnappers who raped her. Held Da Bao prisoner and asked to be killed after all the kidnappers were dealt with. Da Bao suspected her to be schizophrenic and refused grant Lelin's request to kill her despite the latter being the one who murdered Ah Ni, but Lelin committed suicide by throwing herself towards Da Bao's knife blade.
Lin Meijiao	He Yazhi	Mother of Hongbo and Lelin. Suffers from mental illness. She supposedly had stabbed and killed Ah Ni in Ep 14, but Fu Lelin was the true culprit. Currently resides in a mental hospital
Wang Yuqing	Ou Yongtai "Big Little Eyes"	One of the four serial kidnappers who abduct girls, physically and sexually abusing them and then killing them off for the thrill of it. He and the three other kidnappers gang-raped Fu Lelin, causing her alternate personality to emerge. He was also Fu Lelin and Fu Hongbo's stepfather, who physically abused them in the past in anger for having caused his baby daughter's death. He is portrayed as a dirty old man who sometimes visits brothels. In revenge, Fu Lelin left him hanging by the neck and kidnapped Liang Zhichao's daughter so that Liang Zhichao can confront "Big Little Eyes" and had them fight to the death. Instead, Hu Xiaoman intervened, although she intentionally left him to hang to death while she confronted Liang Zhichao to force him to confess to his crimes.
Brandon Wong	Liang Zhichao	Mastermind of the four serial kidnappers who abduct girls, physically and sexually abusing them and then killing them off for the thrill of it. He and the three other kidnappers gang raped Fu Lelin, causing her alternate personality to emerge. He was also a patient of Gao Jieyu and thus hinted to be another victim. On the surface he appears to be a book author and inspirational speaker on the concept of fear. In revenge, Fu Lelin kidnapped his daughter and Gao Jieyu manipulated events such that he ironically caused his own daughter's death by a car accident during his attempt to rescue her. After being exposed, he confessed to his crimes and was taken into custody.
Li Yuejie	Shen Luoqi "Rocky"	One of the four serial kidnappers who abduct girls, physically and sexually abusing them and then killing them off for the thrill of it. He and the three other kidnappers gang-raped Fu Lelin, causing her alternate personality to emerge. He was an adept boxer, having fought off Xiaoman and Langfeng. He was shot by Xiaoman but escaped. Fu Lelin eventually showed up and stabbed him to death while he was still in an injured state.
Luis Lim	Xu Jianbang "Monkey"	One of the four serial kidnappers who abduct girls, physically and sexually abusing them and then killing them off for the thrill of it. He and the three other kidnappers gang-raped Fu Lelin, causing her alternate personality to emerge. His main role in the kidnappings was to dispose of the corpses but showed he was the weakest link when the coffin he was carrying accidentally dropped and revealed one of his victims' bodies. He is portrayed as a dirty old man who frequents brothels and spends most of his pay there. He went into hiding after being exposed but was killed by Fu Lelin.
Allen Lew	Pimp	Owner of an illegal brothel. Liu Shisan accidentally killed him while trying to escape with Xiao Na.
Dick Su	Big Head	Reappeared with a gang, confronting and suspecting Da Bao of being an informer.
Ng Hui	Yao Wanyi	Villain Serial Killer, who was another victim and patient of Gao Jieyu. Wanyi's first victim had his eyes gouged out for alleged negligence in operating on her baby daughter years ago. The second victim had his fingers cut off for taking her money as a bribe without helping her during her lawsuits against the surgeons, and the third victim had his tongue cut off for alleged broken promises to do his best to save her child. The fourth target was initially believed to be her own husband, but was revealed to be Yang Qiujun, mother of Hu Xiaoman, the lawyer who defended her. When Yao Wanyi was caught, Gao Jieyu realized that she had outlived her usefulness and tried to force Xiaoman to kill Yao Wanyi, having hold Yang Qiujun hostage. Yao Wanyi never made it to her fourth victim (Jieyu did it instead), and was accidentally run over by a car on the final episode as she tried to flee from Xiaoman and Da Bao.
Francis Chang	Fang Rong Ge	Main Villain Gao Jieyu's and Hu Xiaoman's Professor back in University. Came up with a theory that serial killers act the way they are due to their own DNA. While Jieyu adored Fang Rongge and believed in his research, Xiaoman disagreed with that theory. In a past case, it was revealed that Xiaoman believed that Fang Rongge was the mastermind behind a serial killer who went about cutting off people's vital parts (Which is now emulated by Yao Wanyi). Fang Rongge remained silent during his trial and was released due to lack of evidence. Xiaoman decided to transfer his fingerprints to a knife on the dead serial killer's body, framing him for murder. He allegedly committed suicide by blowing up his own car while he was still inside, which devastated Jieyu and turning her onto the path of a vengeful serial killer. He was apparently revealed to be the true mastermind in the finale, having faked his own death and manipulated both Xiaoman and Jieyu to go at each other from afar. He currently resides in Korea as a criminal psychologist and Xiaoman escaped from the police force so she could meet up with him, in yet another cliffhanger ending.

== Accolades ==
Organisation	Year	Category	Recipient(s)	Result	Ref
Star Awards	2012	Best Programme Promo	—N/a	Nominated	
Star Awards	2013	Best Director	Chen Yi You	Won	
Star Awards	2013	Best Director	Loh Woon Woon	Nominated	
Star Awards	2013	Best Screenplay	Phang Kai Yee	Nominated	
Star Awards	2013	Best Drama Cameraman	Toh Meng Teck	Won	
Star Awards	2013	Favourite Onscreen Couple (Drama)	Elvin Ng and Rui En	Won	
Star Awards	2013	Top Rated Drama Serial 2012	—N/a	Nominated	
Star Awards	2013	Best Actress	Rebecca Lim	Nominated	
Star Awards	2013	Best Actress	Rui En	Won	
Star Awards	2013	Best Supporting Actor	Tay Ping Hui	Won	
Star Awards	2013	Best Drama Serial	—N/a	Nominated	
