= A Song to Remember (TV series) =

2011 Singaporean Chinese television series

- 星洲之夜
- Genre: Historical period drama Musical
- Written by: Ang Eng Tee 洪荣狄
- Starring: Qi Yuwu; Joanne Peh; Eelyn Kok; Julie Tan; Desmond Tan; Chen Hanwei; Pan Lingling
- Opening theme: 星洲之夜 by Mavis Hee (Yu Hong version)
- Ending theme: 1) 我的快乐世界 (Yu Hong/Liu Jiumei versions); 2) 思念 (同游) (Yu Hong/Song Qiao'er versions); 3) 你的眼泪 (Yu Hong/Liu Jiumei versions); 4) 娘惹舞曲 (Liu Jiumei version); 5) 花样霓虹 (Song Qiao'er/Liu Jiumei versions); 6) 当代花木兰 (Yu Hong version); 7) 若即若离 (Song Qiao'er version); 8)天涯歌女 (Original/Remix) (Liu Jiumei version); 9) 四季歌 (Liu Jiumei version); 10) 夜上海 (Yu Hong/Song Qiao'er/Hua-gu/Liu Jiumei versions)
- Country of origin: Singapore
- Original language: Chinese
- No. of episodes: 30

Production
- Producer: Chia Mien Yang 谢敏洋
- Running time: approx. 45 minutes

Original release
- Network: Mediacorp Channel 8
- Release: 22 November 2011 – 2 January 2012

A Song to Remember (Chinese: 星洲之夜) is a MediaCorp Channel 8 historical-cum-musical drama which is set in the 1930s to 1940s in early Singapore before World War II. It debuted on Channel 8 on 22 November 2011 and was telecast every weekday night at 9.00 pm. It stars Qi Yuwu, Joanne Peh, Eelyn Kok, Julie Tan, Desmond Tan, Chen Hanwei & Pan Lingling as the casts of the series.

It was reported that the scriptwriter Ang Ee Tee took several years to complete the script of this drama. Despite large amounts of resources and money pumped in for the production and promotion of this serial, the drama was not well received by the audience when it was broadcast. Many perceived the show to be boring and slow-paced, and the acting skills of some of the main cast members were heavily criticised. This drama ranked 9th (out of 11 dramas at the 9 pm slot) in the Year 2011 viewership ratings, coming in one of the last. On the other hand, smaller-scale productions such as Love Thy Neighbour managed to clinch the top spot.

== Cast ==
- Qi Yuwu as Mo Liguang 莫李光, a violinist. Dai Yangtian was initially chosen for the role of Mo but he returned to China before production started. Qi was chosen as a replacement.
- Desmond Tan as Luo Xiaoxiao 罗小小, a rickshaw man
- Chen Hanwei as Xu Kun 许昆, a tycoon

Cast	Character	Description
Joanne Peh	Yu Hong 于红	Song Qiao-er's Musical rival
Pan Lingling	Aunt Hua 花姑	Addressed as "Uncle Hua"
Eelyn Kok	Song Qiao-er 宋桥儿	Main Villain; Yu Hong's Musical rival
Julie Tan	Liu Jiumei 刘九妹	Hua-gu's adopted daughter Soda Girl
Jin Yinji	Ba-jie 八姐	Landlady; Brothel owner Mo Liguang's Aunt
Priscelia Chan	Aunt Sweet Potato 番薯嫂	Opium's wife
Rayson Tan	Black Snake 黑蛇	Aunt Snake's husband Killed Hua-gu's ex-boyfriend
Pamelyn Chee	Su Yingying 苏盈盈	Chen Ji's ex-mistress
Yao Wenlong	Luo Dada 罗大大	Luo Xiaoxiao's older brother a Rickshaw Man
Wang Yuqing	Chen Ji 陈计	Villain
Cynthia Koh	Aunt Snake 蛇嫂	Black Snake's wife
Sing Chew	Xiao Man 小曼	Song Qiao-er's companion
Kimberly Chia	Xiao Cui 小翠	
May Phua	Yi Shi Niang 医师娘	Physician's wife
Li Tian Le	Xiao Yue 小月	

== Accolades ==
Organisation	Year	Award	Nominee	Result	Ref
Star Awards	2012	Best Theme Song	"星洲之夜" by Mavis Hee	Nominated	
Star Awards	2012	Best Director	Leong Lye Lin	Nominated	
Star Awards	2012	Best Cameraman	Tommy Lee	Won	
Star Awards	2012	Best Set Design	Ho Hock Choon	Nominated	
Star Awards	2012	Best Drama Editing	Koh Kah Yen	Nominated	
Star Awards	2012	Rocket Award	Desmond Tan	Won	
Star Awards	2012	Best Drama Serial	—N/a	Nominated	
Star Awards	2012	Best Supporting Actor	Chen Hanwei	Nominated	
Star Awards	2012	Best Supporting Actor	Rayson Tan	Nominated	
Asian Television Awards	2012	Best Actress in a Supporting Role	Pan Lingling (as Hua-gu)	Won	
Asian Television Awards	2012	Best Actor in a Supporting Role	Chen Hanwei (as Xu Kun)	Nominated	
