= Fire Up (TV series) =

Singaporean TV series

- 美味下半场
- Genre: Ex-offenders; Cooking
- Created by: Ho Hee Ann 何启安
- Written by: Wawa Creative Team 哇哇创作组
- Directed by: 谢光华 何恕 韩耀光; Sampson Yuen
- Starring: Huang Biren; Thomas Ong
- Opening theme: 谢谢你 by 李代沫 Li Daimo
- Ending theme: 1) Some Days by The Freshman; 2)半年 by Debbie Huang; 3)不流泪 by Issac Dang; 4)因為所以我愛你 by Issac Dang
- Country of origin: Singapore
- Original language: Mandarin
- No. of episodes: 20 (list of episodes)

Production
- Producers: Molby Low Kian Chye 刘健财; Canter Chia 谢光华
- Production location: Singapore
- Running time: approx. 46 minutes
- Production company: Wawa Pictures

Original release
- Network: Mediacorp Channel 8
- Release: 4 October – 31 October 2016

Related
- C.L.I.F. 4; You Can Be an Angel 2

Fire Up (Chinese: 美味下半场) is a Singaporean Chinese drama which was produced by Wawa Pictures and broadcast on Singapore's free-to-air channel, Mediacorp Channel 8. The drama began production in May 2016 and was shown from 4 to 31 October 2016. The show starred Thomas Ong and Huang Biren.

== Plot ==
Mistakes are part and parcel of life. Only when one realizes where his fault lies, is one deserving of a second chance. Those who are given a second chance are usually grateful and work harder. Zheng Mei Mei (Huang Biren), after serving her jail term, got to know Zhuang Ying Xiong (Thomas Ong), a son of a wealthy man. In a bid to win over his father’s trust, he invested in “Mei Mei’s Kitchen” for Mei Mei to run. With his backing and her hard work, the business took off. She also employed several ex-convicts to help out in the shop, giving them a second chance in life as they experience various setbacks that will test their limits.

== Cast ==
=== Main cast ===
Cast	Role	Description	Episodes appeared
Huang Biren 黄碧仁	Zheng Meimei 郑美美	男人婆, Ms Tei Si: Two-time ex-offender; Owner of Zi char eatery; Zhuang Yingxiong's girlfriend; Wu Delan's daughter; Zheng Xiangfan and Zheng Xiangfei's mother; Zheng Xiangfei and Tina's rival in love	1-20
Thomas Ong 王沺裁	Zhuang Yingxiong 庄英雄	Mr Kopi, 小白脸, Lucas Chong: Zheng Meimei's boyfriend; Zhuang Dexian and Huang Xiuqing's son; Zhuang Yingcai's half younger brother; Zheng Xiangfei and Tina's love interest	1-20

=== Supporting cast ===
Cast	Role	Description	Episodes appeared
Brian Ng 黄超群	Zheng Xiangfan 郑向凡	凡凡 (Fan Fan): CID officer; Zheng Meimei's son; Zheng Xiangfei's twin brother; Angel's boyfriend; Promoted to CID officer in episode 19	1-4, 6-9, 12, 15, 17-20
Hayley Woo 胡佳嬑	Zheng Xiangfei 郑向菲	菲菲 (Fei Fei): Zheng Meimei's daughter; Zheng Xiangfan's twin sister; Steve's girlfriend in episode 6; Likes Zhuang Yingxiong in episode 12	1-4, 6-15, 17-18, 20
Anna Lim 林茹萍	Wu Delan 吴德兰	Zheng Meimei's mother; Zheng Xiangfan and Zheng Xiangfei's grandmother	1-4, 6, 8, 11-18
Constance Song 宋怡霏	Eva Liang	Ex-offender; Zheng Meimei's good friend who works at the eater; Leo's mother	1-20
Yap Huixin 叶慧馨	Angel 安琪	Ex-offender; Waffle shop owner; Zheng Xiangfan's girlfriend; Revealed that she was imprisoned for three months in episode 7 for drug abuse; Went to France with George in episode 20	3-4, 6-20
Haden Hee 许立楷	Jiang Shaolong 江绍龙	Younger version portrayed by Shawn Tan; Ex-offender; Works at the eatery; Story's boyfriend; Successfully proposed to Story in episode 20	4-20
Mei Xin 陈美心	Story	Reporter; Lin Jiguang's love interest; Jiang Shaolong's girlfriend	3-6, 8-9, 11, 13-17, 20
Ernest Chong 张顺源	Lin Jiguang 林继光	Ex-offender; Ah Cheng's son; Fishcake seller; Works at the eatery; Likes Story	4-20
Tosh Zhang	George	International cook; Cook genius; Angel's mentor; Went to France with angel in episode 20	8-10, 12, 17, 20
Kelly Liao 廖奕琁	Tina	Zhuang Yingxiong's ex-girlfriend; Tried to run over Zheng Meimei in a car but failed; Repented after Meimei forgave her	1 - 3, 9 - 12
Chen Shucheng	Zhuang Dexian 庄德贤	Zhuang Yingxiong and Zhuang Yingcai's father; Suffered a stroke in episode 19	1-5, 7, 9-11, 15-20
Hsu Chiung Fang 许琼芳	Huang Xiuqing 黄秀琴	Zhuang Dexian's wife; Zhuang Yingxiong's mother; Zhuang Yingcai's stepmother	1-4, 7, 9-12, 15-20
Steve Yap 叶良财	Zhuang Yingcai 庄英才	Main Villain: Demonised because his father had a child with Xiuqing. In order to protect what he deserves to have, sows discord between the family.; Zhuang Yingxiong's elder half-brother; Ivy's husband; Arrested in episode 20	1-3, 7, 9-12, 14-20
Eelyn Kok 郭蕙雯	Ivy	Supporting Villain: Zhuang Yingcai's wife; Zhuang Yingxiong's half-Sister-in-law	2-3, 7, 10-12, 14, 16, 20
David Leong 梁家豪		Boss of a market; Dog owner; Cameo	1
Fraser Tiong 张家奇	Leo	Eva's son; Zheng Xiangfan's good friend	17 - 18
Marcus Mok 莫健发		Steve's father; Zhuang Dexian and Zhuang Yingcai's good friend	6, 8-9
Benjamin Josiah Tan 陈俊铭	Steve	Zheng Xiangfei's boyfriend in episode 6	6, 8-12
Hong Wei Wen 洪伟文		director of an orphanage; Taught Jiang Shaolong how to make two-times pork; Died from an illness	13 - 16

== Original soundtrack ==
Song title	Performer
谢谢你 (Theme Song)	Li Daimo
Some Days	The Freshman 插班生
半年	黄荻鈞 Debbie Huang
不流泪	Issac Dang
因為所以我愛你	Issac Dang

== See also ==
- List of programmes broadcast by Mediacorp Channel 8

== Accolades ==
Year	Organisation	Category	Nominee(s)	Result	Ref
2017	Star Awards	Best Supporting Actor	Chen Shucheng	Nominated	
2017	Star Awards	Best Evergreen Artiste Award| style="background: #FFE3E3; color: black; vertical-align: middle; text-align: center; " class="no table-no2 notheme"|Nominated	Chen Shucheng		
2017	Star Awards	Best Drama Serial	—N/a	Nominated	
