= Hu Wensui =

Chinese actor (born 1981)

- Born: 15 December 1981 (age 43); Shanghai, China
- Other names: James Hu
- Education: Shanghai Theatre Academy
- Occupations: Actor; businessman; filmmaker; tour guide; singer
- Years active: 2001−present
- Height: 1.78 m (5 ft 10 in)
- Spouse: a tour guide (m. 2007)
- Children: 1

Chinese name
- Traditional Chinese: 胡問遂
- Simplified Chinese: 胡问遂
- Hanyu Pinyin: Hú Wènsuì

Hu Wensui (born 15 December 1981) is a Singapore-based Chinese actor, businessman, filmmaker and tour guide.

== Early life and career ==
Hu attended Shanghai Theatre Academy and studied acting. The Shanghai male winner and overall male runner-up in Star Search 2001, Hu signed to Mediacorp as a full-time actor til 2004, during which he participated in more than 50 local drama series. He was also part of the musical group Peace.

After leaving his full-time actor job, Hu started a travel agency with a friend. In 2010, he joined Marina Bay Sands as a casino business development officer and at one point co-owned a martial arts club. In 2020, he produced, directed and acted in his first short film. The following year, he became a full-time video producer with the educational institution Study Trust International.Aside from appearing in local drama series as a freelance actor, Hu also holds a tour guide licence and mainly conducts tours for Chinese tourists.

In February 2022, Hu joined Beam Artistes, an artiste management company owned by Samuel Seow. In a contract agreement between both parties, Hu was promised a monthly remuneration of S$3,500 for his role as a video producer. However, in July 2022, Hu began to discover discrepancies in his pay and Seow's Beam Artistes had stopped making their employer CPF's contributions to Hu, which Hu said in an interview has affected his Singapore citizenship application procedure. Hu subsequently halted his collaborations with the company and a court case was filed in March 2023 after both parties failed to reach a settlement through mediation. In September 2023, the court ruled that Beam Artistes were to pay Hu an estimated sum of S$110,000.

== Personal life ==
Hu is married to a Chinese tour guide and has a son.

In 2017, Hu was involved in a car accident while crossing a road and it caused him to suffer neck and hip injuries.

In 2019, Hu was beaten up by three men after having a conversation with a female ex-colleague in a night club along Aliwal Street. He suffered nose fractures which required cosmetic surgery. The main perpetrator was subsequently jailed for 4 weeks.

Hu has been volunteering at SPCA since 2016. He practises Tiger Muay Thai and has participated in competitions. He is also a Wing Chun instructor and holds a white belt in Jiu-jitsu.

== Selected filmography ==
Hu has appeared in the following programmes and films:

=== Television series ===
- Katong Miss Oh (2002)
- The Vagrant (2002)
- Holland V (2003)
- The Dragon Heroes (2005)
- Daddy at Home (2009)
- Reunion Dinner (2009)
- Double Bonus (2012)
- Yours Fatefully (2012)
- Love at Risk (2013)
- Sudden (2013)
- Gonna Make It (2013)
- C.L.I.F. 2 (2013)
- C.L.I.F. 3 (2014)
- Blessings (2014)
- 118 (2014)
- Let It Go (2015)
- Sealed with a Kiss (2015)
- Crescendo (2015)
- House of Fortune (2016)
- The Truth Seekers (2016)
- The Queen (2016)
- The Gentlemen (2016)
- C.L.I.F. 4 (2016)
- Tanglin (2017)
- Legal Eagles (2017)
- The Lead (2017)
- While We Are Young (2017)
- Gifted (2018)
- Heart to Heart (2018)
- Daybreak (2019)
- The Good Fight (2019)
- My One and Only (2023)
