= Star Awards for Best Director =

Singaporean media awards

Star Awards for Best director
- Current: Star Awards 2024
- Awarded for: Best Director in Mediacorp drama serial
- Country: Singapore
- Presented by: Mediacorp
- First award: 2000
- Currently held by: Wong Foong Hwee / All That Glitters (2024)

The Best Director is an award presented annually at the Star Awards, an annual ceremony held in Singapore where the media organisation Mediacorp recognises entertainers under their employment for outstanding performances of the year.

== Winners and Nominees ==
Table key
indicates the winner

=== 2000s ===
Year	Director(s)	Representative Drama	Ref
2000s
2000	Jasmine Woo 邬毓琳	随心所遇	
2001	Edmund Tse 谢益文	Heroes in Black 我来也	
2001	Chia Meng Yang 谢敏洋	In Pursuit of Peace 何日军再来	
2001	Leong Lye Lin 梁来玲	Beyond the Axis of Truth 法医X档案	
2001	Paul Yuen 袁树伟	Looking for Stars 星锁	
2001	Tay Peck Choo 郑碧珠	In Pursuit of Peace 何日军再来	
2002	Lai Lee Thin 赖丽婷	The Reunion 顶天立地	
2003	Edmund Tse 谢益文	The Unbeatables III 双天至尊 III	
2004	Chong Liung Man 张龙敏	I Love My Family 我爱我家	
2005	Chong Liung Man 张龙敏	Beyond the aXis of Truth II 法医X档案 2	
2006	Chong Liung Man 张龙敏	C.I.D. 刑警2人组	
2007	Chong Liung Man 张龙敏	Mars VS Venus 幸福双人床	
2009	Chia Mien Yang 谢敏洋; Chong Liung Man 张龙敏	The Little Nyonya 小娘惹	

=== 2010s ===
Year	Director(s)	Representative Drama	Ref
2010	Tay Peck Choo 郑碧珠	Together 当我们同在一起	
2010	Chong Liung Man 张龙敏	Together 当我们同在一起	
2010	Lai Lee Thin 赖丽婷	Together 当我们同在一起	
2010	Leong Lye Lin 梁来玲	Baby Bonus 添丁发财	
2010	Loo Yin Kam 卢燕金	Together 当我们同在一起	
2011	Chong Liung Man 张龙敏	Breakout 破天网	
2011	Edmund Tse 谢益文	Your Hand in Mine 想握你的手	
2011	Leong Lye Lin 梁来玲	The Best Things in Life 五福到	
2011	Loo Yin Kam 卢燕金	The Family Court 走进走出	
2011	Wong Foon Hwee 黄芬菲	Unriddle 最火搭档	
2012	Chong Liung Man 张龙敏	C.L.I.F. 警徽天职	
2012	Kok Tzyy Haw 郭贽豪	Kampong Ties 甘榜情	
2012	Leong Lye Lin 梁来玲	A Song to Remember 星洲之夜	
2012	Loo Yin Kam 卢燕金	A Tale of 2 Cities 乐在双城	
2012	Loo Yin Kam 卢燕金	Devotion 阿娣	
2013	Chen Yi You 陈忆幼	Unriddle 2 最火搭档 2	
2013	Doreen Yap 叶佩娟	It Takes Two 对对碰	
2013	Loh Woon Woon 罗温温	Unriddle 2 最火搭档 2	
2013	Loo Yin Kam 卢燕金	Joys of Life 花样人间	
2013	Wong Foong Hwee 黄芬菲	Poetic Justice 微笑正义	
2014	Wong Foong Hwee 黄芬菲	The Dream Makers 志在四方	
2014	Chong Liung Man 张龙敏	The Journey: A Voyage 信约:唐山到南洋	
2014	Leong Lye Lin 梁来玲	Sudden 骤变	
2014	Loo Yin Kam 卢燕金	The Dream Makers 志在四方	
2014	Wong Kuang Yong 黄光荣	Gonna Make It 小小传奇	
2015	Loh Woon Woon 罗温温	Against The Tide 逆潮	
2015	Loo Yin Kam 卢燕金	The Journey: Tumultuous Times 信约：动荡的年代	
2015	Doreen Yap Pei Kiang 叶佩娟	The Journey: Tumultuous Times 信约：动荡的年代	
2015	Wong Foong Hwee 黄芬菲	World at Your Feet 球在你脚下	
2015	Png Keh Hock 方傢福	C.L.I.F. 3 警徽天职 3	
2016	Loh Woon Woon 罗温温	The Dream Makers II 志在四方II	
2016	Ng Lai Huat 黄来发	Mind Game 心迷	
2016	Wong Foong Hwee 黄芬菲	The Dream Makers II 志在四方II	
2016	Loo Yin Kam 卢燕金	The Journey: Our Homeland 信约：我们的家园	
2016	Doreen Yap Pei Kiang 叶佩娟	The Journey: Our Homeland 信约：我们的家园	
2017	Martin Chan 陈金祥	C.L.I.F. 4 警徽天职4	
2017	Doreen Yap Pei Kiang 叶佩娟	The Dream Job 绝世好工	
2017	Lim Mee Nah 林美娜	The Gentlemen 来自水星的男人	
2017	Loh Woon Woon 罗温温	You Can Be an Angel 2 你也可以是天使2	
2017	Wong Foong Hwee 黄芬菲	Hero 大英雄	
2018	Martin Chan 陈金祥	When Duty Calls 卫国先锋	
2018	Doreen Yap Pei Kiang 叶佩娟	Dream Coder 梦想程试	
2018	Loo Yin Kam 卢燕金	The Lead 第一主角	
2018	Loh Woon Woon 罗温温	While We Are Young Z 时代	
2018	Png Keh Hock 方傢福	When Duty Calls 卫国先锋	
2019	Doreen Yap Pei Kiang 叶佩娟	Blessings 2 祖先保佑2	
2019	Koh Siew Hui 高秀慧	VIC 维多利亚的魔力	
2019	Loo Yin Kam 卢燕金	Babies On Board 新生	
2019	Loh Woon Woon 罗温温	The Distance Between 下个路口遇见你	
2019	Png Keh Hock 方傢福	Fifty and Fabulous 五零高手	

=== 2020s ===
Year	Director(s)	Representative Drama	Ref
2021	Martin Chan 陈金祥	All is Well 你那边这么样?我这边OK	
2022	Loh Woon Woon 罗温温	Key Witness 关键证人	
2023	Martin Chan 陈金祥	In Safe Hands 守护星	
2024	Wong Foong Hwee 黄芬菲	All That Glitters 金色大道	

== Multiple wins and nominations ==
The following directors have received two or more Best Director nominations (* indicates no wins):

Nominations	Director
10	Loo Yin Kam 卢燕金*
9	Chong Liung Man 张龙敏
5	Leong Lye Lin 梁来玲
5	Doreen Yap 叶佩娟
5	Wong Foong Hwee 黄芬菲
3	Edmund Tse 谢益文
3	Loh Woon Woon 罗温温
3	Martin Chan 陈金祥
3	Png Keh Hock 方傢福

The following individuals have won multiple Best Director awards:

Wins	Director
8	Chong Liung Man 张龙敏
3	Loh Woon Woon 罗温温
3	Martin Chan 陈金祥
2	Edmund Tse谢益文

== See also ==
- List of Asian television awards
