= The Gentlemen (2016 TV series) =

Singaporean TV series

- Also known as: Mercurial Men
- 来自水星的男人
- Genre: Family; Men; Comedy; Romance
- Written by: Tang Yeow 陈耀; Seah Choon Guan 谢俊源
- Directed by: Lim Mee Nah 林美娜; Lin Mingzhe 林明哲; Cheong Yuan Teng 张愿庭
- Starring: Chen Hanwei; Pierre Png; Aloysius Pang; Cynthia Koh; Paige Chua; Carrie Wong
- Opening theme: 樂度明天 by Chriz Tong
- Ending theme: 像這樣也很好 by Xiang Hua (No commentaries for News Tonight)
- Country of origin: Singapore
- Original languages: Mandarin, with some English dialogue
- No. of episodes: 20

Production
- Executive producer: Soh Bee Lian 苏美莲
- Running time: approx. 45 minutes
- Production company: Mediacorp Studios

Original release
- Network: Mediacorp Channel 8
- Release: 9 August – 5 September 2016

The Gentlemen (Chinese: 来自水星的男人) is a Singaporean drama series produced and telecast on Mediacorp Channel 8. The 20-episode drama serial stars Chen Hanwei, Pierre Png, Aloysius Pang, Cynthia Koh, Paige Chua and Carrie Wong as the main casts of the series.

== Plot ==
The three Zhang brothers come from a family of male chauvinists. Zhang Naiping (Chen Hanwei), the eldest, runs a maid agency. He and his wife, Zou Huimin (Cynthia Koh), are in the midst of divorce proceedings. The second brother, Zhang Nailiang (Pierre Png), is a ballet dancer, while the youngest, Zhang Naiyi (Aloysius Pang), is a student at an arts school. The family is at Naiyi's graduation ceremony. Naiping and Nailiang quarrel over a seat and are sent out of the auditorium. Their mother, He Zhaodi (Jin Yinji), bemoans the death of her husband, Zhang Weida (Zhang Wei), who died half a year ago. She is sad he is not at Naiyi's graduation. Nailiang idolises Xu Ruoqi (Kelly Liao), a dancer. When she picks him for an audition, he is elated. Naiping comes across a maid while she is being abused. Annoyed by the arrogance of the employer, he gets into a brawl with him. They settle their dispute at a police station. Caught up with her job as an insurance agent, Huimin pays no attention to Naiping's injuries. She reminds him to tell Zhaodi about their divorce as soon as possible. Nailiang rents a place on his own. He is confident he will audition successfully and get to join Ruoqi in New York. Naiyi was traumatised by a man with red nails when he was young. Since then, he has had a fear of women whose nails are painted red. Naiyi forgets to retrieve his ATM card after withdrawing money. Sally, who is in the queue behind him, chases after him to return his card. He goes berserk when he sees her red nails and hides in a lingerie shop. The lingerie shop owner is Wang Shengyi (Wang Yuqing). His daughter, Wang Kaixin (Carrie Wong), is nicknamed Princess A Class for her flat chest. She is able to tell the customer's bra cup size by just looking at them. Naiping does not wish to divorce his wife but is too proud to admit it. On his way to the audition, Nailiang notices Su Meidai (Paige Chua), who shooting a print advertisement. Watching her pose seductively while clad only in sexy lingerie, Nailiang trips over a cable. Meidai falls onto him, and the shoot is halted. During the audition, Nailing becomes dizzy and faints while dancing. A debt collector turns up at Naiping's office. Naiping refuses to entertain him, as it was his business partner, Gary, who obtained the loan. The debt collector vandalises the office. Naiyi reports for work at a fashion design company. Sally happens to be one of his colleagues, and tries to return his ATM card. He is so traumatised by her red nails that he spills his beverage...

== Cast ==
=== Main cast ===
- Chen Hanwei as Zhang Naiping 张乃平, a confinement nanny
  - Gary Tan 陈毅丰 as a young Zhang
- Pierre Png as Zhang Nailiang 张乃良, a ballet teacher
  - Ivan Lo as a young Zhang
- Aloysius Pang as Zhang Naiyi 张乃祎, a dashion designer
- Cynthia Koh as Zou Huimin, Zhang Naiping's wife
- Paige Chua as Su Meidai 苏美黛, an undergarment company chairman
- Carrie Wong as Wang Kaixin 王凯欣, an employee of a undergarments company. Wong was told that she would have to have her long locks shorn for her role, as executive producer Soh Bee Lian feels that the character would be more convincing in a bob cut than if she were to wear a wig.

=== Supporting cast ===
Cast	Character	Description
Youyi	Shen Yilin 沈薏琳	Lin (琳), Shen Yee Lin: Francis Ang's ex-wife; Venice and Lisbon/Kusu's mother; Su Meidai's best friend and subordinate; In love with Zhang Naiping (one-sided love); Zhang Naiyi, Xena, Yen and Zoe's colleague
Jin Yinji 金银姬	He Zhaodi 何招娣	Zhang Naiping, Zhang Nailiang and Zhang Naiyi's mother; Zou Huimin's mother-in-law
Wang Yuqing 王昱清	Wang Shengyi 王升义	Bra King (内衣王): Wang Kaixin's father; Iron Man's friend
Toh Xin Hui 杜芯慧	Zhang Jingrou 张静柔	He Zhaodi's granddaughter; Zhang Naiping and Zou Huimin's daughter; Zhang Nailiang and Zhang Naiyi's niece; Venice's classmate
Natalie Mae Tan 陈宥蒽	Venice	Shen Yilin's daughter; Francis Ang's ex-daughter; Su Meidai's goddaughter; Zhang Jingrou's classmate
Joey Feng 冯瑾瑜	Xena	Su Meidai's subordinate; Zhang Naiyi, Shen Yilin, Xena and Zoe's colleague
Shelia Tan 陈玮甜	Yen	Su Meidai's subordinate; Zhang Naiyi, Shen Yilin, Xena and Zoe's colleague
Elizabeth Seah 谢佩佩	Zoe	Su Meidai's subordinate; Zhang Naiyi, Shen Yilin, Xena and Yen's colleague
Collin Chee 銭翰群	Sean	Zou Huimin's love interest; Zhang Naiping's rival in love
Kelly 廖奕琁	Koh Ruoqi 郭若琪	Gigi Koh: Ballet dancer; Zhang Nailiang's love interest
Marcus Mok 莫健发	Tim Ang	Su Meidai and Shen Yilin's superior
Hu Wensui 胡问遂	Francis	Shen Yilin's boyfriend
Adele Wong 王惠珊	Liu Yutong	Ballet school owner; Zhang Nailiang's friend and former schoolmate
David Leong 梁家豪	Francis Ang	Pilot; Shen Yilin's ex-husband; Venice's ex-father; Zhang Naiping's army mate
Zhang Wei 张为	Zhang Weida 张伟大	Old Man (老的): Zhang Naiping, Zhang Nailiang and Zhang Naiyi's Father; Zou Huimin's Father-in-law; He Zhaodi's Husband; Deceased

== Episodes ==
No.	Title	Original release date
1	"Episode 1"	August 9, 2016; PG Some Sexual References This episode aired at 8.29p.m., right after the National Day Parade, while variety programme BENGpire moved to 9.28p.m. Subsequent episodes were aired at 9.00p.m. from August 10 onwards.
2	"Episode 2"	August 10, 2016; PG Some Disturbing Scenes
3	"Episode 3"	August 11, 2016 PG
4	"Episode 4"	August 12, 2016; PG Some Sexual References
5	"Episode 5"	August 15, 2016; PG Some Sexual References
6	"Episode 6"	August 16, 2016; PG Some Sexual References
7	"Episode 7"	August 17, 2016; PG Some Sexual References
8	"Episode 8"	August 18, 2016; PG Some Disturbing Scenes
9	"Episode 9"	August 19, 2016; PG Some Sexual References
10	"Episode 10"	August 22, 2016; PG Some Sexual References
11	"Episode 11"	August 23, 2016; PG Some Sexual References
12	"Episode 12"	August 24, 2016; PG Some Sexual References
13	"Episode 13"	August 25, 2016; PG Some Sexual References
14	"Episode 14"	August 26, 2016; PG Some Disturbing Scenes
15	"Episode 15"	August 29, 2016; PG Some Sexual References
16	"Episode 16"	August 30, 2016; PG Some Sexual References
17	"Episode 17"	August 31, 2016; PG Some Sexual References
18	"Episode 18"	September 1, 2016; PG Some Disturbing Scenes
19	"Episode 19"	September 2, 2016; PG Some Disturbing Scenes
20	"Episode 20 (Finale)"	September 5, 2016; PG Some Disturbing Scenes

== Production ==
The series is first announced in January 2016. Originally, Julie Tan and Xu Bin were also announced to be part of the lineup. Their roles were replaced by Carrie Wong and Aloysius Pang respectively, as Julie turned down the series to allow herself to focus on her role in long-running drama series Peace & Prosperity.

Filming began in February 2016. On 9 March, Toggle interviewed Pang, whose character falls in love with Paige Chua’s. The actors shot the scene where Chua saves his life when Pang falls over a railing at a parking complex in two hours. He was suspended from a third-floor ledge, with a ladder propping him up by the feet during breaks. Pierre Png, who plays a professional ballet dancer in the series, reveals that ballet is “much, much tougher” than boxing (referring to his previous role in Channel 5 telemovie Rise). While others have to take seven years to perfect ballet, he only has one month for his role.

A press conference was held at Cafe Melba in the new Mediacorp campus on 26 July 2016. Chen Hanwei, Pierre Png, Aloysius Pang, Carrie Wong, Paige Chua, Cynthia Koh and Jin Yinji attended the conference.

== Accolades ==
Organisation		Category	Nominee(s)	Result	Ref.
Star Awards	2017	Best Director	Lim Mee Nah 林美娜	Nominated	
Star Awards	2017	Best Screenplay	Tang Yeow and Seah Choon Guan 陈耀 / 谢俊源	Nominated	
Star Awards	2017	Best Actor	Chen Hanwei	Won	
Star Awards	2017	Best Actor	Pierre Png	Nominated	
Star Awards	2017	Young Talent Award	Toh Xin Hui 杜芯慧	Won	
Star Awards	2017	Bioskin Healthiest Hair Award	Pierre Png	Nominated	

== See also ==
- List of programmes broadcast by Mediacorp Channel 8
