= If Only I Could (TV series) =

- Also known as: Begin Again (重來); Through the Years (回到那些年)
- 十年…你还好吗？
- Genre: Time-travel; Suspense; Romance
- Written by: Lim Gim Lan; Kao Lie Boon
- Directed by: Loo Yin Kam; Chen Yi You; Martin Chan
- Starring: Rui En; Paige Chua; Andie Chen; Elvin Ng
- Ending theme: 最美的时光 by Alfred Sim
- Country of origin: Singapore
- Original language: Chinese
- No. of episodes: 20 (list of episodes)

Production
- Executive producer: Chong Liung Man
- Production location: Singapore
- Editor: 林锦兰，许丽雯
- Running time: approx. 45 minutes (exc. advertisements)

Original release
- Network: Mediacorp Channel 8
- Release: 31 May – 27 June 2016

Related
- The Truth Seekers; The Dream Job

If Only I Could (Chinese: 十年…你还好吗？) is a Singaporean drama produced and telecast on Mediacorp Channel 8. The time-travelling series, which consists of 20 episodes, it stars Rui En, Paige Chua, Andie Chen and Elvin Ng as the main characters of the series.

== Plot ==
Chen Zhenhao (Rui En) struggles to keep her family together despite a disapproving mother-in-law, an easygoing husband too generous with his meagre earnings (Andie Chen), and a son with hyperactivity.

Huo Xiwen (Paige Chua) endures marital problems with her husband Huang Degang (Elvin Ng) and suffers a miscarriage after an accident.

Zhenhao is later diagnosed with breast cancer, and together with her former schoolmate and rival, Xiwen, who’s also seen her share of misfortune, the pair travel back in time to start their lives over and avoid all the mistakes they’ve made. But the two long-suffering wives realise they’re worse off than before.

== Cast ==
=== Main cast ===
Cast	Role	Description	Episodes appeared
Rui En 瑞恩	Chen Zhenhao 陈珍好	Wonder Woman (女神), Maniac Woman (女神经病): Auntie (2016); Jezza Cosmetics worker (2006); Zhenzhen Desserts Shop helper (2016); He Daxian's wife; Hui Ling's rival in love; Li Xiumei's daughter-in-law; He Xiaoqi's sister-in-law; He Zijun's mother; Chen Zhenzhu's sister; Ivan's sister-in-law; Wen Fang's auntie; Huo Xiwen's former schoolmate & enemy; Went back to 2006 in Episode 3; Became Hui Ling's adviser for making Daxian like her; Indirectly caused the third miscarriage of Huo Xiwen; Went back to 2016 in Episode 18; Reconciled with Daxian in Episode 19; Unable to convince Xiwen from returning to 2006, leaving the show in a cliffhanger	1-20
Paige Chua 蔡琦慧	Huo Xiwen 霍希文	Villain in 2016 to Huang Degang; Zee & Zee's AVP (2016); Jezza Cosmetics worker (2006); Huang Degang's ex-wife; Huo Zhiyong and Zeng Wanjie's daughter; Chen Zhenhao's former schoolmate & enemy; Liu Kaiqin's best friend; Had a miscarriage in 2006 due to falling down the stairs; Had a miscarriage in Episode 2, caused by Andy and Flora; Went back to 2006 in Episode 3; Had a miscarriage again later in the year 2006 after a car accident with Daxian; blamed Chen Zhenhao for it; Went back to 2016 in Episode 18; Caused the deaths of Eddy and Degang, and Kaiqin's paralysis; Heartbroken over Huo Zhiyong's death in Episode 20; Ignored Daxian and Zhenhao's persuasions and returned to 2006, leaving the show in a cliffhanger	1-20
Andie Chen 陈邦鋆	He Daxian 何大先	Blowhard (大炮先): Handyman (2016 and 2006); Online clothes shop owner (2016); Chen Zhenhao's husband; Hui Ling's love interest and childhood playmate; He Zijun's father; He Xiaoqi's elder brother; Li Xiumei's son; Chen Zhenzhu and Ivan's brother-in-law; Wen Fang's uncle; Hui Ling's love interest; Prevented Chen Zhenhao's elder sister from falling down the stairs in the alternate timeline; Was revealed to have gone back to 2006 in Episode 9; Went back to 2016 in Episode 18, and is revealed to be diagnosed with stage 3 prostate cancer; Reconciled with Chen Zhenhao in Episode 19; Suffered relapses after an outing and when Xiwen decides to return to 2006, leaving the show in a cliffhanger	1-20
Elvin Ng 黄俊雄	Huang Degang 黄德刚	Main Villain: Zee & Zee's CEO (2016); Jezza Cosmetics worker (2006); Property agency CEO (2016); Huo Xiwen's ex-husband; Liu Kaiqin's husband; Huo Zhiyong and Ceng Wanjie's ex son-in-law; Huang Hongtao's foster son; Learnt Xiwen was the mastermind behind the kidnaps, inadvertently getting killed by the flower pots in the house; (Deceased – Episode 20)	1-20

=== Supporting cast ===
Cast	Role	Description	Episodes Appeared
Tracy Lee 李美玲	Liu Kaiqin 刘凯芹	Huo Xiwen's best friend; Huo Xiwen and Chen Zhenhao's colleague; Huang Degang's mistress; Paralyzed after she tried to seek help for Eddy when they are kidnapped	1-3, 5-20
Hong Huifang 洪慧芳	Li Xiumei 李秀美	Gambler; He Daxian and He Xiaoqi's mother; Chen Zhenhao's mother-in-law; Hui Ling and Meihua's neighbor; Fell off the flat after being chased by the loanshark in the alternate timeline; (Deceased - episode 11)	1-11
Li Wenhai 李文海	Huo Zhiyong 霍志永	Jezza Cosmetics CEO; Zeng Wanjie's husband; Huo Xiwen's father; Huang Degang's father-in-law; Died from overdose of medication after his business went bankrupt in the original timeline; Suffers from dementia after the death of Wanjie in the alternate timeline; Died after committing suicide from the impact of the house acquisition; (Deceased - Episode 3 and 20)	1, 3, 7, 9-20
Lin Meijiao 林梅娇	Zeng Wanjie 曾婉洁	Huo Zhiyong's wife; Huo Xiwen's mother; Huang Degang's mother-in-law; Died after suffering a stroke when Degang took Xiwen out in the original timeline; Died from a stroke after learning Degang's extramarital affair with Kaiqin in the alternate timeline; (Deceased - Episode 16)	1, 4, 6, 9-10, 12-14, 16
Chen Fengling 陈凤凌	Chen Zhenzhu 陈珍珠	Chen Zhenhao's elder sister; Ivan's ex-wife; Wen Fang's mother; Zhenzhen Desserts Shop owner (2016)	2, 4-15, 17-19
Andi Lim 林伟文	Ivan	Chen Zhenzhu's ex-husband; Wen Fang's father; Tried to assault Chen Zhenhao in Episode 15 for ruining his plan to extort her sister's money, and harmed Daxian	7-8, 14-15
Shanice Koh 许抒宁	Wen Fang 文芳	Younger version portrayed by Sun Yi En: Chen Zhenzhu and Ivan's daughter; Chen Zhenhao's niece	2, 4, 7-10, 14
Shawn Tan 陈凯轩	He Zijun 何梓俊	He Daxian and Chen Zhenhao's son; He Xiaoqi's nephew; Li Xiumei's grandson; Diagnosed with hyperactivity; Did not exist in the alternate timeline	1, 3
Donald Chong 张俊豪	Eddy	Does not exist in the original timeline; Huang Degang and Liu Kaiqin's son; Died from an asthma attack after he and Kaiqin were kidnapped; (Deceased - Episode 20)	18-20
Hayley Woo 胡佳嬑	He Xiaoqi 何小琦	He Daxian's younger sister; Li Xiumei's daughter; Chen Zhenhao's sister-in-law	3, 6, 9-12, 16-19

=== Cameo/special appearance ===
Note: Only credited cameos are mentioned.

Cast	Role	Description	Episodes Appeared
Youyi 有懿	Hui Ling 惠玲	Online clothes shop co-owner (2016); In love with He Daxian (one-sided love); He Daxian's neighbour and playmate Chen Zhenhao's rival in love	3, 6-7, 12-16, 18-19
Rynn Lim 林宇中	Lin Sen 林森	Restaurant owner (2016 and 2006); In love with Huo Xiwen (one-sided love); Chen Zhenhao's love interest in the past	3, 5-6, 8-14
盧佳俊	Loanshark 大耳窿	Kidnapped He Daxian and Ah B after they lent them $500	1
郭锦荣	Loanshark 大耳窿	Kidnapped He Daxian and Ah B after they lent them $500	1
林秀莲	Meihua 美花	He Daxian and Chen Zhenhao's neighbour who lives below them	1
Esther Low 刘慧娴	Flora	Huang Degang's mistress	1-3
陈斯伦	Andy	Went bankrupt after Huang Degang and Huo Xiwen refused to renew a contract with him Caused Xiwen's miscarriage after seeking revenge on her	1, 3
Ric Liu 刘晋旭	Ah B 阿B	Coffeeshop worker He Daxian's friend	1-3, 6, 10-12
Dick Su 苏才忠	Mr Teo	Huang Degang's subordinate	3
陸韦杰	Alex	Chen Zhenhao's blind date	4
卢冠耀	Eric	Huo Zhiyong's subordinate	4, 11, 15, 17
Hoong Kuo Juey 洪国锐	Huang Hongtao 黄鸿涛	Security officer Huang Degang's foster father Fired by Jezza Cosmetics in Episode 4	4-5, 13

== Original soundtrack ==
Song title	Song type	Performer	Lyricist	Composer	Song Arranger / Producer	Provided by
最美的时光	Theme Song	Alfred Sim 沈志豪	Pierre Zhang 张乐声	Jim Lim 林倛玉	Jim Lim 林倛玉	Funkiemonkies Pte Ltd

== Accolades ==
Accolades	Category	Nominees	Result	Ref
The Road to Star Awards 2017 Episode 1	Best Screenplay	Lim Gim Lan & Kao Lie Boon	Nominated	
Star Awards 2017 Awards Ceremony	Best Theme Song	《最美的时光》by Alfred Sim	Won	
Star Awards 2017 Awards Ceremony	Best Evergreen Artiste Award	Hong Huifang	Nominated	
Star Awards 2017 Awards Ceremony	Best Actor	Andie Chen	Nominated	
Star Awards 2017 Awards Ceremony	Best Actress	Rui En	Nominated	
Asian Television Awards 2017	Best Theme Song	《最美的时光》by Alfred Sim	Nominated	

== Trivia ==
- This was Elvin Ng's second villainous role since The Ultimatum (2009).
- Rui En's first role as an aunt. She puts on 4 kg just for this role to make her role looked more realistic.
- Rui En, Paige Chua, Elvin Ng and Andie Chen previously starred in Code of Honour (2011). Then, Rui En was Andie Chen's younger sister and in love with Elvin Ng, while Paige Chua was Chen's admirer. For this drama, there is a reshuffle; Paige Chua pairs up with Elvin Ng, while Rui En pairs up with Andie Chen. This also marks the second time the "RuiVin" pair do not play an onscreen couple, after C.L.I.F. 3 - Then, Rui En was paired up with Li Nanxing, while Elvin Ng was paired up with Tracy Lee first, then Sora Ma.
- This was Elvin Ng and Tracy Lee's fourth collaboration after No Limits, C.L.I.F. and C.L.I.F. 3.
- This was Tracy Lee's first drama in terms of filming schedule (second chronologically, after Peace & Prosperity) after converting her full-time Mediacorp contract to a per-project one. This move is to allow her to study early childhood education.
- This was Malaysian singer Rynn Lim's second Singaporean drama since The Beginning (2007).
- This was the first instance of which a theme song is arranged at the end of each episode during the credits. There are two ending sequences in this series - one that begins with Xiwen and another that begins with Daxian. Excluding the first episode, this was the 14th series where News Tonight commentaries are not announced.
- The Series reran on weekdays on 5.30pm at Mediacorp Channel 8, succeeding The Dream Makers II.
- The title card, as well as shots from the time-traveling tunnel, was shot at the tunnel near Alexandra Technopark.

== See also ==
- List of programmes broadcast by Mediacorp Channel 8
- List of If Only I Could episodes
