= My Teacher Is a Thug =

- 爱.不迟疑
- Genre: Drama; Romance; Family; Education
- Created by: Goh Chwee Chwee 吴翠翠; Thye En Miin 戴恩敏
- Written by: Goh Chwee Chwee 吴翠翠
- Directed by: Loo Yin Kam 卢燕金; Paul Yuen 袁树伟; Gao Shu Yi 高淑怡
- Starring: Li Nanxing; Bonnie Loo; Cavin Soh; Jeremy Chan; Terence Cao; Zhu Houren
- Opening theme: 爱不迟疑 By Matthew Teng
- Ending theme: 还好 By Bonnie Loo 妈妈 By Bonnie Loo; Do-Re-Mi By Bonnie Loo & Jeremy Chan 请你跟我这样做 By Ruth Chua
- Country of origin: Singapore
- Original language: Chinese
- No. of episodes: 25

Production
- Executive producer: Paul Yuen 袁树伟
- Running time: approx. 45 minutes (excluding advertisements)

Original release
- Network: Mediacorp Channel 8
- Release: 28 August – 29 September 2017

My Teacher Is a Thug (Chinese: 爱.不迟疑) is a 25 episode Singaporean drama produced and telecast on Mediacorp Channel 8. This series repeated at 12pm on Tuesday to Saturday in May 2022 to June 2022. It stars Li Nanxing, Bonnie Loo, Cavin Soh, Jeremy Chan and Terence Cao as the casts of the series.

== Casts ==
- Li Nanxing as Jia Tianxiong
- Zong Zijie as young Jia Tianxiong
- Bonnie Loo as Zeng Kaixin/Jia Kaixin
- Phyllis Quek Lian Jiaxuan
- Jeremy Chan as Gao Xiaoming
- Cavin Soh as Zeng Guangrong
- Liu Xutao as young Zeng Guangrong
- Lina Ng as Li Lijun
- Fang Rong as young Li Lijun
- Terence Cao as Fang Chen
- Bernard Tan as Lian Yongcheng
- Zhu Houren as Lian Guodong

== Production ==
- Filming began in April and wrapped in July 2017

== See also ==
- List of programmes broadcast by Mediacorp Channel 8
