= Bonnie Loo =

Malaysian actress and singer (born 1994)

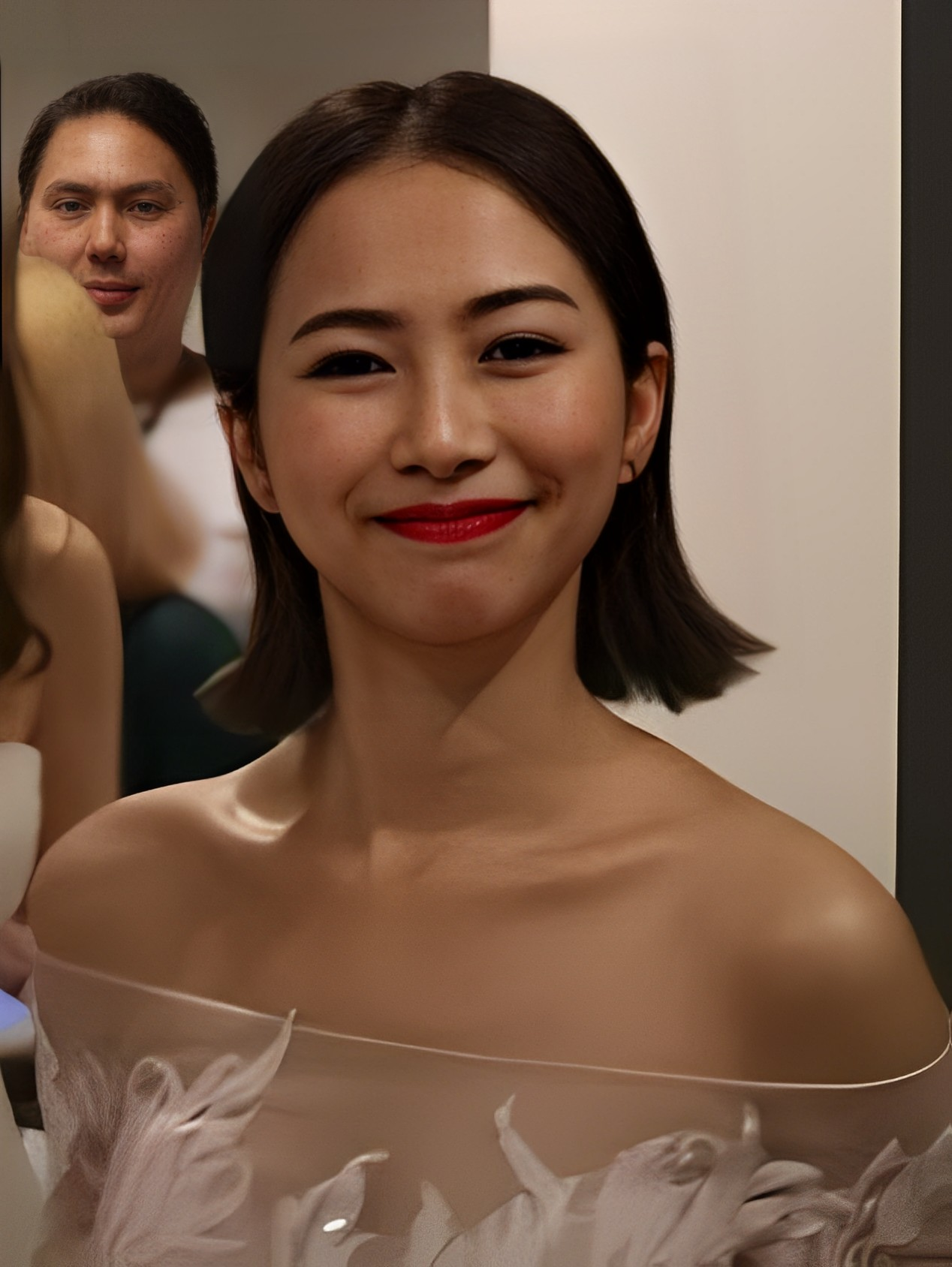
- Loo at the Star Awards 2017
- Born: 12 July 1994 (age 32); Ipoh, Perak, Malaysia
- Education: Riverside Secondary School
- Occupations: Singer; actress
- Years active: 2013–present
- Musical career
- Genre: Mandopop
- Instrument: Vocals

Chinese name
- Traditional Chinese: 羅美儀
- Simplified Chinese: 罗美仪
- Hanyu Pinyin: Luó Měiyí
- Jyutping: Lo4 Mei5 Ji4
- Hokkien POJ: Lô Bí-gî

Bonnie Loo (born 12 July 1994) is a Malaysian actress and singer based in Singapore managed by The Celebrity Agency.

== Early life ==
Loo was born in Ipoh, Perak, Malaysia, and is the elder of two daughters. She began to take singing lessons when she was 10 years old, and enrolled in numerous singing competitions in the Asia Pacific region since the age of 6. Her family emigrated to Singapore when she was 12 years old both for her higher education and her father's job posting to Singapore. She graduated with a Singapore-Cambridge GCE Ordinary Level from Riverside Secondary School.

== Career ==
She rose to fame in 2013 when she participated in and won the fourth season of Campus SuperStar, one of the Chinese singing competitions held in Singapore. Her victory made the series' history since the show began in 2006 as the first female winner, and her grand prize included a two-year Mediacorp management contract, $5,000 cash and the opportunity to perform with Taiwan-based singer Ding Dang in Glass Anatomy The Musical.

=== Acting career ===
In November 2013, Loo announced that she would be starring in Singaporean television series C.L.I.F. 3 as Yang Hongxi, the daughter of Terence Cao's role, and would be part of a Chinese New Year compilation album in a song together with Julie Tan, Jayley Woo, Ian Fang and Shane Pow in 2014.

At the Star Awards 2021, Loo obtained her first Top 10 Most Popular Female Artistes award.

=== Music career ===
Subsequently, Loo was signed to one of Asia's key music labels, S2S Pte. Ltd., as a result of her win on Campus SuperStar. During an interview, Loo mentioned that she would take a break from her studies and embark on her singing career after completing her GCE O-Level examinations.

On 9 December 2017, Loo held her first music showcase (美仪首歌) at the 2mm Talent Hub. She held a second music showcase, "Bonnie's Tribute to Singapore Music" (美仪首歌2), as part of Esplanade's Huayi – Chinese Festival of Arts on 1 March 2018.

== Filmography ==
=== Television series ===
Year	Title	Role	Notes	Ref.
2014	Against The Tide	Liu Xiaojing		
2014	C.L.I.F. 3	Yang Hongxi		
2014	The Caregivers	Coco		
2015	Life - Fear Not	Peng Chu'er		
2015	Crescendo	Wang Yafang		
2015	Tiger Mum	Chen Huiyan		
2015	Second Chance (流氓律师)	Yahui		
2016	Hero	Guan Meimei		
2016	Soul Reaper (勾魂使者)	Hazel		
2016	C.L.I.F. 4	Yang Hongxi		
2016	The Dream Job	Qiu Xinling		
2016	House of Fortune	Qian Ningning		
2017	My Teacher Is a Thug	Zeng Kaixin		
2017	Mightiest Mother-in-Law	Qi Wanling		
2018	You Can Be An Angel 3 (你也可以是天使3)	Zhu Xiaorou		
2018	Life Less Ordinary	Zhang Qiyuan		
2019	C.L.I.F. 5	Lu Kexin		
2019	Old Is Gold (老友万岁)	Silver Sung		
2019	Walk With Me (谢谢你出现在我的行程里)	Chen Yuqin		
2019	Limited Edition (我是限量版)	Gao Xuanxuan		
2020	Best Friends Forever (致2020的我们)	Ziying		
2020	Super Dad? (男神不败)	Xu Huiying		
2020	How Are You Today? (今天，你还好吗？)	Meiqi		
2020	A Jungle Survivor (森林生存记)	Bai Lixuan		
2021	Crouching Tiger Hidden Ghost	Angie Lee Enqi		
2021	The Heartland Hero	Sophie		
2021	Key Witness (关键证人)	Hannah		
2022	First of April (愚人计划)	Luo Jingwen		
2022	First of April (愚人计划)	Ella		
2022	First of April (愚人计划)	Faye		
2022	Healing Heroes (医生不是神)	Xu Sumei		
2023	Family Ties	Situ Feifei		
2023	Till the End	Lu Zixuan		
2023	The Sky is Still Blue	Babyanne		

== Awards and nominations ==
Year	Ceremony	Category	Nominated work	Result	Ref
2016	Star Awards	Best Supporting Actress	Tiger Mum (as Chen Huiyan)	Nominated	
2016	Star Awards	Best Theme Song	Tiger Mum (未知数)	Nominated	
2017	Star Awards	Best Supporting Actress	Hero (as Guan Meimei)	Nominated	
2017	Star Awards	Top 10 Most Popular Female Artistes	—N/a	Nominated	
2018	Asia Model Festival Award	Model Star Award (Singapore)	—N/a	Won	
2018	Star Awards	Best Supporting Actress	Mightiest Mother-in-Law (as Qi Wanling)	Nominated	
2018	Star Awards	Top 10 Most Popular Female Artistes	—N/a	Nominated	
2018	Star Awards	Best Theme Song	Life Less Ordinary (小人物向前冲)	Nominated	
2019	Star Awards	Top 10 Most Popular Female Artistes	—N/a	Nominated	
2021	Asian Television Awards	Best Actress in a Supporting Role	Crouching Tiger Hidden Ghost	Nominated	
2021	Star Awards	Top 10 Most Popular Female Artistes	—N/a	Won	
2021	Star Awards	Best Supporting Actress	C.L.I.F. 5 (as Lu Kexin)	Nominated	
2021	Star Awards	Best Theme Song	Heart to Heart (幸福茶点)	Nominated	
2022	Seoul Webfest	Best Supporting Actress	Crouching Tiger Hidden Ghost (as Angie Lee Enqi)	Nominated	
2022	Star Awards	Best Supporting Actress	Key Witness (as Hannah Chua)	Nominated	
2023	Star Awards	Top 10 Most Popular Female Artistes	—N/a	Nominated	
2024	Star Awards	Top 10 Most Popular Female Artistes	—N/a	Nominated	
2025	Star Awards	Top 10 Most Popular Female Artistes	—N/a	Nominated	
