= Star Awards 2017 =

Singaporean television awards

Star Awards 2017 红星大奖2017
- Sponsored by: LG; Seng Choon Eggs; Chan Brothers Travel; Simmons; Mercedes-Benz (Official Car); Systema (Partner Sponsor); Vintage Studio (Partner Sponsor); Etude House (Official Make-up); Reebonz (Backstage Live Presenter)
- Date: The Road to Star Awards; 26 March 2017; 2 April 2017; 9 April 2017; Walk of Fame & Awards Ceremony; 16 April 2017
- Location: MES Theatre @ Mediacorp (Awards Ceremony); Studio 1 (The Road to Star Awards)
- Country: Singapore
- Presented by: London Choco Roll; Bioskin
- Hosted by: The Road to Star Awards Show 1 & 2 Lee Teng; Pornsak; The Road to Star Awards Show 3 Lee Teng; Kate Pang; Walk of Fame; Pornsak; Kate Pang; Youyi; Glenn; Awards Ceremony; Lee Teng; Backstage; Jeremy Chan; Kimberly Wang; Kenneth Chung

Highlights
- Most awards: Drama: The Dream Job; The Gentlemen; Hero (2 each); Variety/Info-ed: As I Hold Your Hand (2)
- Most nominations: Drama: Hero (16); Variety/Info-ed: BENGpire (4)
- Best Drama: Hero
- Best Variety Show: Hearts & Hugs
- All-time Favourite Artiste: Elvin Ng; Joanne Peh; Quan Yi Fong
- Website: "Official website". Archived from the original on 27 March 2017.

Television/radio coverage
- Network: Mediacorp Channel 8 Mediacorp Channel U Toggle
- Runtime: 180 mins (Awards Ceremony); 60 mins (Walk of Fame); 60 mins (The Road to Star Awards)

Star Awards 2017 (also SA2017, Chinese: 红星大奖2017) is a television award ceremony which is held in Singapore. It is part of the annual Star Awards organised by Mediacorp for free-to-air channels Channels 8 and U. The Road to Star Awards 2017 was broadcast live on 26 March, and 2 and 9 April 2017. The theme for the 2017 Star Award is "Iridescence".

The nominations for the awards were first revealed 23 January 2017, followed by the Top 10 Most Favourite Artistes on a press conference on 3 March 2017 at Marina Square. 12 programs won at least one award, among which Best Drama Serial Hero, along with The Dream Job and The Gentlemen, as well as variety series As I Hold Your Hand, were tied with the most wins for a ceremony with two.

== Programme details ==
Date	Shows	Time	Channels
26 March 2017; 2 April 2017; 9 April 2017	The Road to Star Awards 2017	9.00 pm to 10.00 pm	Mediacorp Channel 8 Toggle
16 April 2017	Star Awards 2017 – Walk of Fame	5.30 pm to 6.30 pm	Mediacorp Channel 8 Mediacorp Channel U Toggle Astro Shuang Xing Astro Shuang Xing HD Astro GO
16 April 2017	Star Awards 2017 – Awards Ceremony	7.00 pm to 10.00 pm	Mediacorp Channel 8 Mediacorp Channel U Toggle Astro Shuang Xing Astro Shuang Xing HD Astro GO

== The Road to Star Awards 2017 ==
As part of the "3+1" format introduced exclusively this year, The Road to Star Awards 2017 is a series of three one-hour live-broadcast prelude shows leading up to the main presentation (on 16 April) itself, premiering on 26 March. Each one of the three episodes focuses on one of the award categories with invited artistes, mostly nominees, usually come to discuss the award ceremony and predicted their favorites for the acting categories. The end of each episode also reveal the current standing for the Top 10 Most Favorite Artistes award, and the bottom four artistes (per each category) at the close of the third episode were eliminated from running of the award, a first in Star Awards history.

Winners are listed first, highlighted in boldface.

=== Episode 1 – Drama ===
The theme for Show 1 focuses on drama, and artistes – mainly the performance category nominees, were invited to the preludes and asked to select their favourites for the acting categories. Andie Chen was the artistes' choice for Best Actor and Best Supporting Actor, while Zoe Tay and Paige Chua were the picks for Best Actress and Best Supporting Actress, respectively.

**Young Talent Award**: **Toh Xin Hui – The Gentlemen as Zhang Jingrou 张静柔**; Donald Chong – You Can Be an Angel 2as Roy; Cruz Tay – My First School as Wang Likang 王立康; Perez Tay – You Can Be an Angel 2 as Xie Bucuo 谢不错; Alston Yeo – The Dream Job as Young Zhang Lixing 小张立行	**Best Director**: **Martin Chan Fook Shin – C.L.I.F. 4**; Doreen Yap Pei Kiang – The Dream Job; Lim Mee Nah – The Gentlemen; Loh Woon Woon – You Can Be an Angel 2; Wong Foong Hwee ^{1} – Hero
**Best Screenplay**: **Cheong Yan Peng and Ng Kah Huay – The Truth Seekers**; Ang Eng Tee – Hero; Lau Ching Poon – You Can Be an Angel 2; Lim Gim Lan and Kao Lie Boon – If Only I Could; Tang Yeow and Seah Choon Guan – The Gentlemen	**Best Dressed Celeb**: **Zoe Tay**; Jeanette Aw; Rebecca Lim; Elvin Ng; Desmond Tan

^1The nominee was absent from the show.

=== Episode 2 – Variety ===
The theme for Show 2 is variety, focusing on the variety and info-ed awards, as well as awards sponsored by the show's brands, Bioskin and London Choco Roll. During the show, Quan Yi Fong was the artistes' choice for the Best Programme Host. In one segment, the variety hosts also compared awards they have won so far.

**Bioskin Healthiest Hair Award**: **Zhang Zhenhuan**; Ian Fang; Desmond Ng; Pierre Png; Romeo Tan	**London Choco Roll Happiness Award**; **London Choco Roll**: **Ian Fang – The Dream Job as Lin Zijie 林梓杰**; Shaun Chen – Hero as Zhou Fada 周发达; Shane Pow – House of Fortune 钱来运转 as Bai Zhengyu 白正宇; Jeffrey Xu – Peace & Prosperity as Lu Xiaoqiang 鹿小强; Yao Wenlong – Peace & Prosperity as Xiao Tiantian 萧天天
**Best Variety Producer**: **Jean Toh – As I Hold Your Hand**; Cheng Xin Hui – What's in the Fridge; Gan Bee Khim – BENGpire; Kang Lay See – The 4 Chefs; Alfred Yeo – Hearts & Hugs	**Best Variety Research Writer**: **Lam Yen Fong – As I Hold Your Hand**; Evelyn Gow – Lunar New Year Eve Special 2016; Lim Kar Yee – As I Hold Your Hand; Seow Zi Xian – BENGpire; Wong Eng Hong – Chefs on Wheels
**Best Speech**: **Mark Lee**; Chen Hanwei; Chen Liping ^{2}; Elvin Ng	

^2The nominee was absent from the show.

=== Episode 3 – Stardom ===
In the third and final week of preludes, Kate Pang replaced Pornsak as co-host, since the latter took leave. The All-Time Favourite Artistes, Quan Yi Fong, Elvin Ng and Joanne Peh were interviewed by Dennis Chew with a series of quick-fire question and answer segment; Peh, who pre-recorded her acceptance speech in anticipation of her labour of her second child, provided the funniest answer when asked to share her "favourite body part" of husband Qi Yuwu. South Korean actor So Ji-sub made an appearance at the end of the episode, who was tasked to unlock the briefcase containing the envelopes for the shortlists for the 40 artistes still running for the Top 10 Most Popular Artiste award.

**Best News Story**
- **Ang Poh Ling and Lu Yawen – Two-year-old Boy Wrongfully Confined; Police Force Open Door for Rescue**
  - Evelyn Lam Li Ting – Illegal Bus Touting at East Coast Park
  - Loi Kar Yee – Holland Village Standard Chartered Bank Robbed Police Chasing Culprit
  - Seet Sok Hwee – BLK 203 Ang Mo Kio Tuberculosis Cluster
  - Xia Shan Shan Elise and Chai You Xia – Feeding Babies with Sleeping Pills 35-year-old Nanny Arrested
**Best Current Affairs Story**
- **Seoow Juin Yee – Focus: 19 Years after Unification**
  - Chua Sin Kai – Frontline: How to avoid scams?
  - Eg Yik Fan and Yeo Wei Qiang – Money Week: Orchard Road Losing its Shopping Paradise Shine?
  - Raymond Foong – Frontline: Singaporean in London
  - Seoow Juin Yee, Tan Yeun Siok, Pang Pau Xian, Goh Chye Kim and Jiao Yihui – Focus: Taiwan's Election Preview

== Star Awards 2017 awards ceremony ==
The awards ceremony was held on 16 April 2017 at the MES Theatre @ Mediacorp. The ceremony was hosted by Lee Teng and featured a total of 16 international presenters and performers.

Winners are listed first, highlighted in boldface.

**Best Drama Serial**: **Hero**; C.L.I.F. 4; Fire Up; The Dream Job; You Can Be an Angel 2	**Best Theme Song**: **If Only I Could 《最美的时光》- Alfred Sim**; Eat Already? 《吃饱没?》 - Jim Lim, Cavin Soh, Ric Liu; Life - Fear Not 《人生无所畏》- Liang Wern Fook; The Dream Job《年轮》- Shi Xin Hui, Jim Lim; You Can Be an Angel 2《天使》- Kelly Poon
**Best Variety Programme**: **Hearts & Hugs**; BENGpire; Chefs on Wheels; Happy Can Already!; The 4 Chefs	**Best Variety Special**: **Star Awards 2016 – Part 2**; Lions Charity Show 2016; Lunar New Year's Eve Special 2016; Star Awards 2016 – Part 1; Star Awards 2016 – Walk of Fame
**Best Info-Ed Programme**: **Unique Towns**; Innocence Lost; Markets in Asia; Tuesday Report: All In The Family; Tuesday Report: The Nursing Story	**Best Evergreen Artiste Award**: **Xiang Yun – Peace & Prosperity as Shen Ping An 沈平安**; Chen Shucheng – Fire Up as Zhuang Dexian 庄德贤; Hong Huifang – If Only I Could as Li Xiumei 李秀美; Aileen Tan – Hero as Huang Lili 黄丽丽; Rayson Tan – Life - Fear Not as Zhuang Daoqiang 庄道强
**Best Actor**: **Chen Hanwei – The Gentlemen as Zhang Naiping 张乃平**; Andie Chen – If Only I Could as He Daxian 何大先; Shaun Chen – Hero as Zhou Fada 周发达; Pierre Png – The Gentlemen as Zhang Nailiang 张乃良; Zhang Zhenhuan – The Dream Job as Zhang Lixing 张立行	**Best Actress**: **Zoe Tay – You Can Be an Angel 2 as Wang Ruojun 王若君**; Jeanette Aw – The Dream Job as Cheng Huishan 程卉杉; Rebecca Lim – You Can Be an Angel 2 as Guan Xinni 关馨霓; Jesseca Liu – Hero as Zhang Weixiong 张伟雄; Rui En – If Only I Could as Chen Zhenhao 陈珍好
**Best Supporting Actor**: **Romeo Tan – The Dream Job as Tim Goh 吴康顺**; Andie Chen – Hero as Ou Jinguang 区金光; Chen Shucheng – Fire Up as Zhuang Dexian 庄德贤; Ian Fang – The Dream Job as Lin Zijie 林梓杰; Jeffrey Xu – Peace & Prosperity as Lu Xiaoqiang 鹿小强	**Best Supporting Actress**: **Aileen Tan – Hero as Huang Lili 黄丽丽**; Paige Chua – Hero as Ou Jinxuan 区金萱; Bonnie Loo – Hero as Guan Meimei 关美美; Pan Lingling – Hero as Xiao Jiahui 萧家慧; Ya Hui – House of Fortuneas Wu Xixi 吴希希
**Best Programme Host (Variety, Info-Ed & Infotainment)**: **Quan Yi Fong – Markets in Asia**; Guo Liang – Your Thoughts Please?; Lee Teng – The 4 Chefs; Desmond Ng – BENGpire; Bryan Wong – Hear Me Out

=== Special awards ===
**All Time Favourite Artiste^{3}**	**Joanne Peh**	2004 | 2005 | **2009** | **2010** | **2011** | 2012 | **2013** | **2014** | **2015** | **2016**
**All Time Favourite Artiste^{3}**	**Quan Yi Fong**	2005 | 2006 | 2007 | **2009** | **2010** | **2011** | **2013** | **2014** | **2015** | **2016**
**All Time Favourite Artiste^{3}**	**Elvin Ng**	2006 | 2007 | **2009** | **2010** | **2011** | 2012 | **2013** | **2014** | **2015** | **2016**

^3This award is a special achievement award given out to artiste(s) who have achieved a maximum of 10 popularity awards over 10 years. Top 10 winning years all three of recipients were awarded are highlighted in boldface, while years with only one recipient winning are highlighted in italics. The award will not be presented in 2018, as there are no recipients with ten Top 10 Most Popular Male or Female Artistes award wins to allow the award to be presented that year.

==== Top 10 Most Popular Artistes ====
This year's Top 10 Most Popular Artistes awards sees the number of nominees expanded by eight – four per gender – to 48, the second time to expand such number since 2011 (which had 21). As usual, viewers voted for their favourite artiste through telepoll and online voting (each weighing 50% of the results). At the end of the preludes, the top 20 artistes for each gender advanced to the main presentation to vie for the Top 10 awards. Voting for the awards opened at noon on 4 March and ended at 8:30 pm on 16 April.

The nominees are listed in telepoll line order. The results of the Top 10 awards are not in any rank order.

Key

	Females
	Males
Italic	New to list (not nominated the previous year)
**Bold**	Top 10 winners
	Show 1 Bottom 4
	Show 2 Top 8 / Main presentation Top n
n	Recipient's accumulated number of awards
	Artiste was eliminated after the preludes

Week ending	**Show 1**	**Show 2**	**Show 3**	**Main Presentation**	
Week ending	**Show 1**	**Show 2**	**Show 3**	Top 18	Top 10
**Top 10 Most Popular Female Artistes 十大最受欢迎女艺人**
**Sora Ma** **(1900-112-2001)**		Top 8			1
Lin Meijiao **(1900-112-2002)**	Bottom 4		Eliminated		
He Yingying **(1900-112-2003)**					
**Jesseca Liu** **(1900-112-2004)**					6
**Tong Bing Yu** **(1900-112-2005)**					2
Pan Lingling **(1900-112-2006)**					
**Felicia Chin** **(1900-112-2007)**					7
Aileen Tan **(1900-112-2008)**	Bottom 4		Eliminated		
**Ya Hui** **(1900-112-2009)**		Top 8			2
Kate Pang **(1900-112-2010)**					
Wendy Xiao Ying 曾晓英 **(1900-112-2011)**					
Priscelia Chan **(1900-112-2012)**	Bottom 4		Eliminated		
**Paige Chua** **(1900-112-2013)**		Top 8			3
Lin Peifen 林佩芬 **(1900-112-2014)**					
**Rebecca Lim** **(1900-112-2015)**		Top 8			6
Hong Huifang **(1900-112-2016)**	Bottom 4		Eliminated		
Seraph Sun **(1900-112-2017)**					
Sheila Sim **(1900-112-2018)**					
Julie Tan **(1900-112-2019)**		Top 8			
Hong Ling **(1900-112-2020)**					
**Kym Ng** **(1900-112-2021)**		Top 8			9
**Carrie Wong** **(1900-112-2022)**		Top 8			3
Bonnie Loo **(1900-112-2023)**		Top 8			
**Jayley Woo** **(1900-112-2024)**					2
**Top 10 Most Popular Male Artistes 十大最受欢迎男艺人**
Shaun Chen **(1900-112-2025)**					
Terence Cao **(1900-112-2026)**	Bottom 4		Eliminated		
Thomas Ong **(1900-112-2027)**					
**Pornsak** **(1900-112-2028)**		Top 8			6
Andie Chen **(1900-112-2029)**					
Zhu Houren **(1900-112-2030)**			Eliminated		
Zhang Yaodong **(1900-112-2031)**					
Xu Bin **(1900-112-2032)**					
Chen Tianwen **(1900-112-2033)**	Bottom 4				
**Zhang Zhenhuan** **(1900-112-2034)**		Top 8			3
Jeffrey Xu **(1900-112-2035)**					
**Romeo Tan** **(1900-112-2036)**		Top 8			3
**Ben Yeo** **(1900-112-2037)**		Top 8			2
Pierre Png **(1900-112-2038)**			Eliminated		
**Ian Fang** **(1900-112-2039)**		Top 8			2
**Desmond Ng** **(1900-112-2040)**					1
Yao Wenlong **(1900-112-2041)**	Bottom 4		Eliminated		
Cavin Soh **(1900-112-2042)**					
Chen Shucheng **(1900-112-2043)**	Bottom 4				
**Desmond Tan** **(1900-112-2044)**		Top 8			2
**Shane Pow** **(1900-112-2045)**					3
**Dennis Chew** **(1900-112-2046)**		Top 8			7
Guo Liang **(1900-112-2047)**					
**Lee Teng** **(1900-112-2048)**		Top 8			5

== Multiple nominations ==
=== Dramas and programmes with multiple nominations ===
Dramas that received multiple nominations
Nominations	Drama
12	Hero 大英雄
9	The Dream Job 绝世好工
8	You Can Be an Angel 2 你也可以是天使2
5	The Gentlemen 来自水星的男人
5	If Only I Could 十年。。。你还好吗？
4	Peace & Prosperity 富贵平安
3	Fire Up 美味下半场
2	C.L.I.F. 4 警徽天职4
2	House of Fortune 钱来运转
2	Life - Fear Not 人生无所畏
1	The Truth Seekers 真探

Programmes that received multiple nominations
Nominations	Variety/Info-ed
4	BENGpire 黑黑真好玩
3	As I Hold Your Hand 大手牵老手
3	Star Awards 2016 红星大奖2016
3	The 4 Chefs; 4大名厨
2	Chefs on Wheels 大厨驾到
2	Frontline 前线追踪
2	Focus 焦点
2	Hearts and Hugs 爱心72小时
2	Lunar New Year Eve Special 2016 灵猴庆丰年
2	Markets in Asia 游市集
2	Tuesday Report 星期二特写

=== Dramas and programmes with multiple awards ===
Dramas that received multiple awards
Wins	Drama
2	The Dream Job 绝世好工
2	The Gentlemen 来自水星的男人
2	Hero 大英雄
1	C.L.I.F. 4 警徽天职4
1	If Only I Could 十年。。。你还好吗？
1	Peace & Prosperity 富贵平安
1	The Truth Seekers 真探
1	You Can Be an Angel 2 你也可以是天使2

Programmes that received multiple awards
Wins	Variety/Info-ed
2	As I Hold Your Hand 大手牵老手
1	Focus 焦点
1	Hearts and Hugs 爱心72小时
1	Markets in Asia 游市集
1	Star Awards 2016 红星大奖2016

== Presenters and performers ==
The following individuals presented awards or performed musical numbers.

=== Presenters ===
Name(s)	Show	Role
	All shows	Announcer for Star Awards 2017
Zoe Tay 郑惠玉	Prelude 1	Presenter of the award for Young Talent Award
Bryan Wong 王禄江; Pierre Png 方展发; Jeanette Aw 欧萱; Elvin Ng 黄俊雄; Chen Hanwei 陈汉玮	Prelude 1	Presenters of the award for Best Director
Rebecca Lim 林慧玲; Desmond Tan 陈泂江; Paige Chua 蔡琦慧; Rui En 瑞恩; Shaun Chen 陈泓宇	Prelude 1	Presenters of the award for Best Screenplay
CEO of Bioskin; Ms. Mathilda Koh	Prelude 2	Presenter of the award for Bioskin Healthiest Hair Award
CEO of London Biscuits Berhad; Datuk Seri Liew Yew Chung 拿督斯里刘佑忠; Romeo Tan 陈罗密欧	Prelude 2	Presenters of the award for London Choco Roll Happiness Award
Quan Yi Fong 权怡凤; Pornsak; Lee Teng 李腾; Desmond Ng 黄振隆; Mark Lee 李国煌	Prelude 2	Presenters of the award for Best Variety Producer
Pornsak; Desmond Ng 黄振隆; Mark Lee 李国煌	Prelude 2	Presenters of the award for Best Variety Research Writer
Chief Customer Officer, Mediacorp; Debra Soon 孙舒珊	Prelude 3	Presenter of the awards for Best News Story and Best Current Affairs Story
Shiou Chieh Kai 修杰楷; Hsia Yu-chiao 夏于乔	Main Presentation	Presenters of the awards for Best Info-Ed Programme and Best Variety Programme
Della Ding 丁当; Guo Xin 郭鑫	Main Presentation	Presenters of the award for Best Theme Song
Mimi Chu 朱咪咪	Main Presentation	Presenter of the award for Best Evergreen Artiste
Krystal Jung 郑秀晶; Amber An 安心亚	Main Presentation	Presenters of the awards for Best Supporting Actor and Best Supporting Actress
Lang Tsu-yun 郎祖筠	Main Presentation	Presenter of the awards for Best Programme Host and Best Variety Special
Minister in Prime Minister's Office; Chan Chun Sing 陈振声	Main Presentation	Gave out the award for All-Time Favourite Artistes
Bowie Lam 林保怡	Main Presentation	Presenter of the award for Best Actor
Kai Ko 柯震东	Main Presentation	Presenter of the award for Best Actress
Chairman of Mediacorp; Ernest Wong 黄源荣	Main Presentation	Gave out the award for Best Drama Serial
Cheryl Yang 杨谨华; Mickey Huang 黄子佼	Main Presentation	Presenters of the award for Top 10 Most Popular Female Artistes
Jang Hyuk 张赫; Mickey Huang 黄子佼	Main Presentation	Presenters of the award for Top 10 Most Popular Male Artistes
CEO of Mediacorp; Shaun Seow 萧文光	Main Presentation	

=== Performers ===
Name(s)	Show	Role	Performed
Felicia Chin 陈凤玲	Prelude 1	Performer	Performed 《人生无所畏》 from Life - Fear Not 人生无所畏
Carrie Wong 黄思恬	Prelude 1	Performer	Performed 《天使》 from You Can Be an Angel 2 你也可以是天使2
Elvin Ng 黄俊雄; Marcus Chin 陈建彬; Wang Lei 王雷	Prelude 2	Performers	Performed 《吃饱没？》 from Eat Already? 吃饱没？
Andie Chen 陈邦鋆	Prelude 3	Performer	Performed 《最美的时光》 from If Only I Could 十年。。。你还好吗？
Shaun Chen 陈泓宇; Rebecca Lim 林慧玲	Prelude 3	Performers	Performed 《年轮》 from The Dream Job 绝世好工
Richie Koh 许瑞奇; Denise Camillia Tan 陈楚寰; He Yingying 何盈莹; Hong Ling 洪凌; Bonnie Loo 罗美仪; Michelle Wong 黄怡灵; Desmond Ng 黄振隆	Prelude 3	Performers	Performed 《摩天轮》
So Ji-sub 苏志燮	Prelude 3	Special appearance	Special appearance, delivered the envelopes for the Top 20 shortlists
Drum Tao	Main Presentation	Performers	Drum performance 《舞动的太鼓》
Della Ding 丁当	Main Presentation	Performer	Performed 《手掌心》, 《我爱他》 and 《想恋一个爱》
Eleanor Lee 李凯馨	Main Presentation	Quan Yi Fong's daughter Performer	All-Time Favourite Artiste acceptance speech Performed 《谢谢你》
Hiroki Hara	Main Presentation	Magician	Magic performance

== Ceremony information ==
=== Award Information ===
The 2017 show announced that the format will feature a "3+1" format, with broadcast of three prelude episodes focusing mostly on technical awards and discussions prior to the actual ceremony, thus making it the first show since 2009 to have one main ceremony. While technical awards are presented during the lead-up shows, the backstage awards (Best Set Design, Best Cameraman and Best Editing) and the Rocket Award were neither mentioned nor awarded for unknown reasons. The Best News Story and Best Current Affairs Story were presented for the last time this ceremony, ending a 17-year tradition where News and Current Affairs awards are presented in the awards since its inception in 2000 (the Best News Presenter and Best Current Affairs Presenter had last presented in 2013 and had not presented since then despite Channel 8 News & Current Affairs had more than ten nominations for the categories).

Owing to Jeanette Aw's dominance in viewer-based awards, voting-based awards had been reworked during the ceremony, whereas online voting are now incorporated along with the Top 10 Most Favourite Artistes, and had its other categories removed until its reappearance in 2022. The Top 10 had also expanded its number of nominations to 24 for the first time since 2011 (with 21 nominations), with intermediate eliminations for the first time ever after the third prelude show ended (however, 2000 was the first time where a nomination, Erica Lee, was removed during the voting period).

With the Infocomm Media Development Authority's revamp of its measurement of viewership, as well as the introduction of infomercials in prime-time programming (as was first seen in The Truth Seekers and Tanglin), both the Top Rated Variety Programme and Top Rated Drama Serial awards were also removed.

=== Consecutive and records in award categories, first in Top 10 ===
- This is the fourth instance whereby all but one of the nominees for a single category (in this case, Best Supporting Actress) were nominated for the same programme. (The previous three instances were in 2003 for Best Supporting Actor, 2004 for Best Comedy Performer and 2009 for Best Supporting Actress.)
- Terence Cao and Cheng Xiao Ying has by far the longest absence by any returning artiste at a gap of 19 and 16 ceremonies, having last nominated in 1998 and 2001, respectively.
- Eight artistes were nominated for the Top 10 for the first time, which were Bonnie Loo, He Yingying, Hong Ling, Seraph Sun, Sora Ma, Andie Chen, Cavin Soh and Desmond Ng.
- Chen Hanwei was tied with Xie Shaoguang on winning the most number of Best Actor wins, with five.
- Star Awards was tied with NKF Charity Show on winning the most number of Best Variety Special wins, with seven.
- The nominations for the Best Drama Serial saw records:
  - You Can Be an Angel Too became the tenth series to receive more than one nomination for the category.
  - C.L.I.F. became the first series to receive a fourth nomination for the category, surpassing The Unbeatables and The Journey's three. C.L.I.F. 4 Best Drama Serial loss to Hero meant it set a record for most nominations for the category without winning Best Drama Serial.

== Star Awards 2018 nominations ==
The 2017 ceremony won the Best Variety Producer in the ceremony next year. However, due to the absence of the Best Variety Special category for the first time since 2000, Star Awards ended its 11-show streak of being nominated since the 2006 ceremony.

Nominee	Award	Accolade	Representative work	Result
Gan Bee Khim 颜美琴	Star Awards 2018 (Backstage Achievement Award) 红星大奖2018之幕后英雄颁奖礼	Best Variety Producer 最佳综艺编导	Star Awards 2017 红星大奖2017	Won
