= Elvin Ng =

Singaporean actor and model (born 1980)

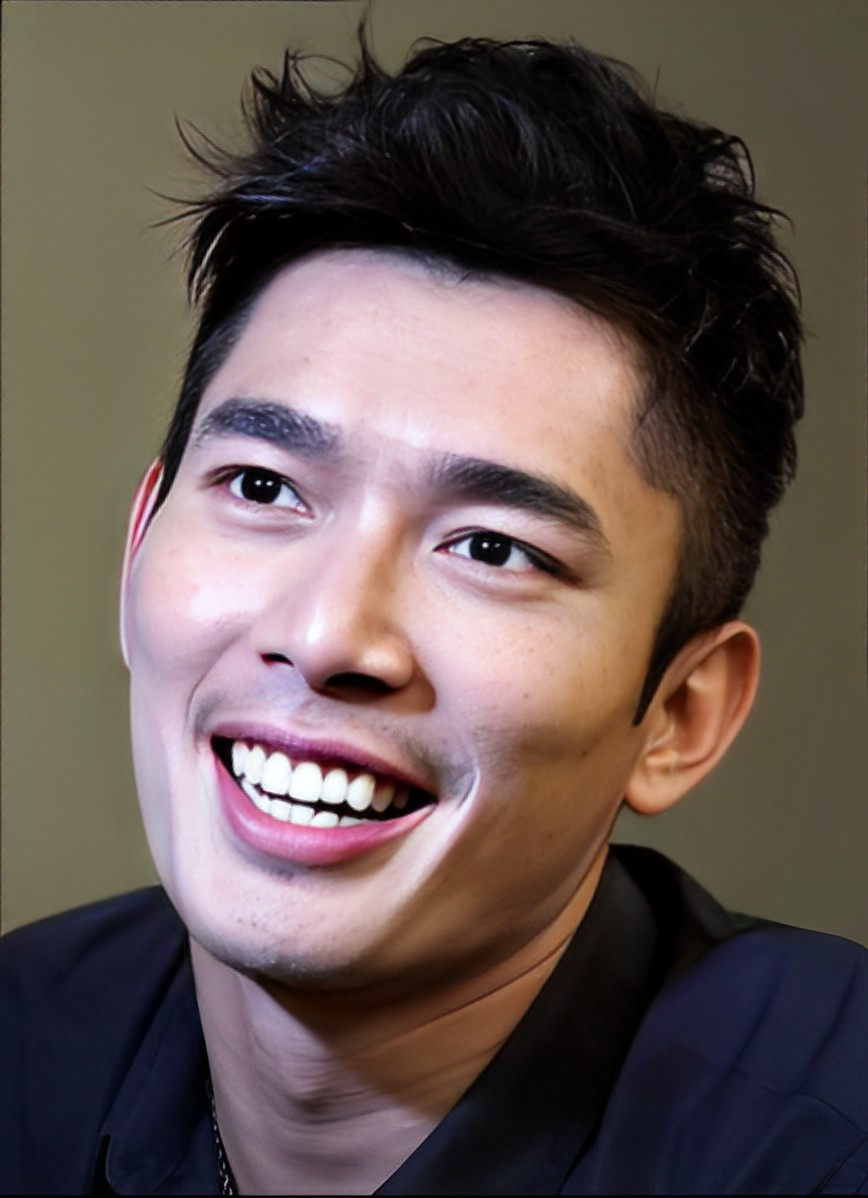
- Ng in May 2017
- Born: 23 December 1980 (age 45); Singapore
- Education: Jurong Primary School; Catholic High School; National Junior College
- Alma mater: National University of Singapore
- Occupations: Actor; model
- Years active: 2005–present

Chinese name
- Traditional Chinese: 黃俊雄
- Simplified Chinese: 黄俊雄
- Hanyu Pinyin: Huáng Jùnxíong

Elvin Ng Choon Siong (born 23 December 1980) is a Singaporean actor and former model.

== Early life ==
Ng attended Jurong Primary School, Catholic High School and National Junior College. He graduated with an honours degree in English literature from the National University of Singapore.

== Career ==
Ng was discovered through a talent search programme School Belle and the Beau hosted by MediaCorp DJ and Host, Dennis Chew and Belinda Lee, during his university days. They were filming the variety show at National University of Singapore where Ng studies at and his performance and looks caught the attention of the producers at MediaCorp. Ng was then given a supporting role in the 2005 series A Life of Hope where he acted alongside Joanne Peh, and after the airing of the series, MediaCorp offered Ng a contract with them.

Subsequently, Ng received two nominations at the Star Awards 2006, but lost the Most Popular Newcomer award to Kelvin Tan Weilian.

He won the Rocket Award for the biggest breakthrough at the Star Awards 2010 after earning a Best Actor nomination for his performance as a young man with autism in the series Breakout and also he was nominated for best on-screen couple with Zhou Ying in the same year.

In 2008, Dai Xiangyu replaced him, who was originally selected but was injured just prior to the filming, to play the role of Yamamoto Yousuke, in the drama series, The Little Nyonya.

== Filmography ==
=== Television series ===
Year	Title	Role	Notes	Ref.
2005	Love Concierge (爱的掌门人)	Tanako-san		
2005	A Life of Hope	Liangyi		
2006	Love at 0°C	She Weixiang		
2007	Kinship	Chen Yingjun		
2007	Kinship 2	Chen Yingjun		
2007	The Peak	Cai Zhihang		
2007	Happily Ever After	Yang Tianying		
2007	Happily Ever After	Cowherd		
2008	By My Side	Chen Buqun		
2008	Rhythm of Life	Liu Zhiyuan		
2009	Together	Huang Zhihao		
2009	The Ultimatum	Ye Renyi		
2009	The Dream Catchers	Sato		
2010	Breakout	Zou Jieming		
2010	No Limits	Ou Yaoyang		
2010	New Beginnings	Ye Jiajun		
2011	Code of Honour	Song Yazai		
2011	Code of Honour	Yuan Chenxi		
2011	C.L.I.F.	Zhang Guixiang		
2012	Absolutely Charming	Song Haomin		
2012	Unriddle 2	Xie Langfeng		
2013	The Journey: A Voyage	Zhang Dong'en		
2013	I'm in Charge	Liu Guowei		
2013	It's a Wonderful Life	Gu Zhiji		
2014	World at Your Feet	Wu Weixiong		
2014	Who Killed the Lead (侦凶)	Detective Anthony		
2014	C.L.I.F. 3	Zhang Guixiang		
2015	Life - Fear Not	Wu Yanbin	Cameo appearance	
2015	Sealed with a Kiss	Zhu Jianan		
2015	Angry Feat	Wang Kailang		
2015	Let It Go (分手快乐)	Mark Chow		
2015	You Can Be an Angel Too	Fu Jiazi		
2016	You Can Be an Angel 2	Cameo appearance		
2016	Eat Already?	Chen Zhiwen		
2016	C.L.I.F. 4	Zhang Guixiang		
2016	If Only I Could	Huang Degang		
2017	Eat Already? 2	Chen Zhiwen	Cameo appearance	
2017	118 II	Deng Bo		
2018	Till We Meet Again - Prequel (千年来说对不起 — 前传)	Tang Sanzang		
2018	Gifted	Guan Yaozu		
2018	Eat Already? 4	Chen Zhiwen		
2018	20 Days	Edrick Soh		
2019	Old Is Gold (老友万岁)	Hugo Ho	Cameo appearance	
2019	All Is Well - Taiwan (你那边怎样, 我这边OK)	Eric Loke		
2019	Hello Miss Driver (下一站，遇见)	Fang Wenliang		
2019	Heart to Heart (心点心)	Yue Wenguang		
2020	Mister Flower (花花公子)	Gao Yufei		
2020	How Are You 2 (好世谋2)	Huang Juxiong	Cameo appearance	
2020	14 Days(14天的同居人)	Edwin		
2020	Terror Within (内颤)	Ke Yanyu		
2020	In The Wind	Finn	Cameo appearance	
2021	The Heartland Hero	Li Xiaofeng		
2023	My One And Only	Wan Defu		
2025	Emerald Hill - The Little Nyonya Story (小娘惹之翡翠山)	Chen Dong Hao		
2025	The Spirit Hunter	Ah Lin Ta		

=== Film ===
Year	Title	Role	Notes	Ref.
2014	The Jade Elephant	Sam Lee	Telemovie	
2014	Unexpected Strangers (小心陌生人)	Wu Weixiong	Toggle original movie	

== Bibliography ==
- Our Epic Little Lives (伟大的卑微; 2013)

== Awards and nominations ==
Year	Awards	Category	Nominated work	Result	Ref
2006	Star Awards	Best Newcomer	A Life of Hope (as Liang Yi)	Nominated	
2006	Star Awards	Top 10 Most Popular Male Artistes	—N/a	Won	
2007	Star Awards	Top 10 Most Popular Male Artistes	—N/a	Won	
2009	Star Awards	Top 10 Most Popular Male Artistes	—N/a	Won	
2010	Star Awards	Rocket Award	Together (as Huang Zhihao)	Won	
2010	Star Awards	Best Actor	Together (as Huang Zhihao)	Nominated	
2010	Star Awards	Favourite Male Character	Together (as Huang Zhihao)	Nominated	
2010	Star Awards	Top 10 Most Popular Male Artistes	—N/a	Won	
2011	Star Awards	Top 10 Most Popular Male Artistes	—N/a	Won	
2011	Star Awards	Best Actor	Breakout (as Zhou Jieming)	Nominated	
2011	Star Awards	Favourite Male Character	Breakout (as Zhou Jieming)	Won	
2011	Star Awards	Favourite Onscreen Couple	with Zhou Ying in Breakout (as Tang Ying and Zhou Jieming)	Nominated	
2011	Star Awards	Systema Charming Smile Award	—N/a	Won	
2012	Star Awards	Top 10 Most Popular Male Artistes	—N/a	Won	
2012	Star Awards	Favourite Male Character	C.L.I.F. (as Zhang Guixiang)	Won	
2012	Star Awards	Favourite Onscreen Couple	With Rui En in Code of Honour (as Ou Ke Lu and Song Yazai)	Won	
2012	Star Awards	Systema Charming Smile Award	—N/a	Won	
2013	Star Awards	Top 10 Most Popular Male Artistes	—N/a	Won	
2013	Star Awards	Favourite Onscreen Couple (with Rui En)	Unriddle 2 (as Xie Langfeng)	Won	
2014	Star Awards	Top 10 Most Popular Male Artistes	—N/a	Won	
2014	Star Awards	Favourite Male Character	I'm In Charge (as Liu Guowei)	Won	
2014	Star Awards	London Choco Roll Happiness Award	I'm In Charge (as Liu Guowei)	Nominated	
2014	Star Awards	Star Awards for Most Popular Regional Artiste (China)	—N/a	Nominated	
2014	Star Awards	Star Awards for Most Popular Regional Artiste (Malaysia)	—N/a	Nominated	
2014	Star Awards	Star Awards for Most Popular Regional Artiste (Indonesia)	—N/a	Nominated	
2014	Star Awards	Star Awards for Most Popular Regional Artiste (Cambodia)	—N/a	Nominated	
2015	Star Awards	Top 10 Most Popular Male Artistes	—N/a	Won	
2015	Star Awards	Favourite Male Character	World At Your Feet (as Wu Weixiong)	Nominated	
2015	PPCTV Awards	Favourite Male Character	The Journey: A Voyage (as Zhang Dong'en)	Won	
2015	PPCTV Awards	Favourite Lead Actor	The Journey: A Voyage (as Zhang Dong'en)	Won	
2015	PPCTV Awards	Favourite Onscreen Couple (with Felicia Chin)	Don't Stop Believin' as Wu Yanbin)	Nominated	
2016	Star Awards	Top 10 Most Popular Male Artistes	—N/a	Won	
2016	Star Awards	YES 93.3FM Best Speech Award	—N/a	Won	
2017	Star Awards	All-Time Favourite Artiste	—N/a	Won	
2018	Star Awards	Bioskin Most Charismatic Artiste Award	—N/a	Won	
2021	Star Awards	Best Actor	All Is Well (as Eric Loke)	Nominated	
2022	Star Awards	Favourite Onscreen Couple (with Rui En)	Mister Flower (as Gao Yufei)	Nominated	
