= Adele Wong =

Singaporean actress, singer, writer, and screenwriter (born 1983)

- Born: 8 March 1983 (age 43); Singapore
- Other name: Wang Xiaohui
- Education: National University of Singapore
- Occupations: Actress; singer; writer; screenwriter
- Years active: 2006–present

Chinese name
- Traditional Chinese: 王筱惠
- Simplified Chinese: 王筱惠
- Hanyu Pinyin: Wáng Xiǎohuì

Adele Wong (born 8 March 1983) is a Singaporean actress, singer, writer, and screenwriter.

== Life and career ==
Born in Singapore, Wong traces her ancestry to Shanghai, China. She graduated from the National University of Singapore (NUS) with an honors degree in sociology. At NUS, Wong was active in dance and theatre.

Upon graduation, Wong began her professional career in acting, hosting and writing. She played the lead role in Damned which was part of an omnibus feature film which premiered at the Osaka Asian Film Festival in 2009. Wong also played a lead role in Garden Girls, a short film, which premiered at the Singapore Film Festival in 2009.

Wong has been seen in several television programs in Singapore. She recently starred as the female lead Annie in Jack Neo's first English-language drama series for Okto titled Happily Ever After. She was also seen in the 2009 MediaCorp Chinese New Year television film, A Kuchinta Family Reunion. In July 2009, Wong played the lead female character opposite Christopher Lee in a Chinese-language television drama, He Ain't Pesky, He's My Brother, for MediaCorp's Channel 8.

Wong's feature film debut was as the female lead role in The Days which was screened at the Tokyo International Film Festival, the Singapore International Film Festival and short listed for the New Talent Award at the Shanghai International Film Festival. Wong also sang the theme song for the film, Knowing (懂), which was written and produced by Jim Lim (林倛玉).

Besides acting, Wong writes both fiction and non-fiction. She hosts a column on Sinema's website. She was also awarded a grant for a short film by the Singapore Film Commission. Hanging Gardens, starring Wong, went into production in August 2009.

== Selected filmography ==
=== Television series ===
Year	Title	Role	Network	Notes	Ref.
2011	Perfect Deception	Evelyn	Mediacorp Channel 5		
2016	The Gentlemen	Liu Yutong			
2016	The Dream Job	Li Ziyun		Cameo	
2016	The Hush	Nina	Mediacorp Channel 5		
2017	My Friends From Afar	Huang Lirong		Cameo	
2017	While We Are Young	Ah Jie		Cameo	
2017	Life Less Ordinary	Wang Xueling			
2017	P.I.	Cheryl C	Mediacorp Channel 5		
2017	Home Truly	Bi Qilin			
2018	You Can Be An Angel 3 (你也可以是天使3)	Eve			
2018	The Distance Between (下个路口遇见你)	Warren's mother		Cameo	
2018	Blessings 2	Du Shini			
2018	Babies On Board	Connie			
2018	A Million Dollar Dream	Fang Ziling			
2019	Dear Neighbours (我的左邻右里)	Arlene			
2019	Playground (游乐场)	Hu Qingfang	Toggle		
2019	128 Circle	Low Mei Zhen	Mediacorp Channel 5		
2019	Walk With Me (谢谢你出现在我的行程里)	Lyn		Cameo	
2023	The Sky is Still Blue	Elaine			
2023	Cash on Delivery	Juncong's mother			
2023	All That Glitters	Weng Suxin			
2023	My One and Only (TV series)	Du Xiaojuan			

=== Film ===
Year	Title	Role	Notes	Ref.
2008	The Days	Shan Shan		
2011	Perfect Rivals	Young Mei Mei		

=== Short films ===
- Damned
- Garden Girls
- The Gang

=== Music video appearances ===
- "懂 Knowing"
