= The Truth Seekers =

2016 Singaporean TV drama series

- Also known as: The Other Truth (真相); Cold Case Investigators (悬案侦探社)
- 真探
- Genre: Action; Sci-fi; Suspense
- Written by: Ng Kah Huay 黄佳华; Cheong Yan Ping 张彦平
- Directed by: Sam Loh 罗胜; Lin Mingzhe 林明哲; Oh Liang Cai 胡凉财
- Starring: Rebecca Lim; Chen Hanwei; Desmond Tan; Yusuke Fukuchi
- Opening theme: Colours of Life (白光棱镜) by Lin Si Tong
- Ending theme: 1) Sir (嚼士) by Lin Si Tong and Yeo Min; 2) Killer Boy by Ferlyn Wong
- Country of origin: Singapore
- Original language: Chinese
- No. of episodes: 23

Production
- Executive producer: Wong Kuang Yong 黄光荣
- Production locations: Singapore & Malaysia, Cameron Highlands
- Running time: approx. 45 minutes (exc. advertisements)

Original release
- Network: Mediacorp Channel 8
- Release: 28 April – 30 May 2016

Related
- Beyond Words; If Only I Could

The Truth Seekers (Chinese: 真探) is a Singaporean drama produced and telecast on Mediacorp Channel 8. The show aired at 9pm on weekdays and had a repeat telecast at 8am the following day. The series stars Chen Hanwei, Rebecca Lim, Desmond Tan and Yusuke Fukuchi who play a team of cold-case investigators who go over unsolved mysteries to uncover the truth. It consists of 23 episodes, and began its run from 28 April 2016.

== Cast ==
=== Main ===
- Chen Hanwei as Bai Qingxiong 白庆雄: A former CID team leader, Bai Qingxiong, formed a detective agency called the Cold Case Investigators (CCI) and also the team leader of the investigators.
- Rebecca Lim as Huang Yuyang 黄渝阳: A former CID team member, Hang, joined the CCI as an investigator.
  - Isabel Yamada (山田熙) as young Huang Yuyang
- Desmond Tan as Hong Junyan 洪俊焱: A CCI investigator
  - Ezekiel Chee (徐从义) as young Hong Junyan
- Yusuke Fukuchi 福地祐介 as Lan Haifeng 蓝海峰 : The IT Whiz of CCI, Lan is also a shareholder of the CCI and also member of the investigation team.

=== Supporting cast ===
- Hong Ling as Momoko Bai Xue'er 白雪儿, Bai Qingxiong and Yamamoto Atsuki's daughter
- Lynn Poh 傅芳儀 as Yamamoto Atsuki 山本秋月, a Japanese restaurant owner
- Pan Lingling as June He Xiulian 何秀莲, a dance Instructor and Huang Deliang's wife
- Brandon Wong as Wang Kunxing 王昆兴, a CID officer
- Guo Liang as Ye Rongtao 叶荣涛, the Commissioner of Police

=== Cameo appearance ===
Cast	Character	Description
Chue En Jye 朱恩洁	Zhou Miaoqin 周妙琴	Mother of a murdered victim who was killed in 2001
陈愿冲	Guangsheng 广升	Police officer
赵娜	May	He Xiulian's colleague at the dance school
Teo Ser Lee 张思丽	Sakura 樱花	Dragon Fruit's wife Bai Qingxiong's old flame/friend/acquaintance Runs a seafood restaurant in Malaysia
Li Yuejie 李岳杰	Dragon Fruit 火龙果	Sakura's husband Runs a seafood restaurant in Malaysia

=== Unsolved cases characters ===
==== Park Murder (公园裸尸案) ====
Cast	Character	Description
Yusuke Fukuchi 福地祐介	Lan Haifeng 蓝海峰 ✘	Main suspect-cum-hirer of the case Li Xiaoqing's boyfriend Was suspected of murdering Li Xiaoqing and served detention, only to be released in 2010; See Cold Case Investigators (CCI)
Melody Low	Li Xiaoqing 李晓晴 †	Lan Haifeng's girlfriend Li Junlang's daughter Rainbow Charity volunteer Killed by Liang Meiyun at the park, thinking that she caused her son's death (Deceased - 18 February 2008)
Marcus Mok 莫健发	Li Junlang 李俊朗	Li Xiaoqing's father Local Billionaire; Forgave Lan Haifeng in the end and provided equipment for CCI in episode 3
Debra Teng 丁玉鸿	Junlang's wife 俊朗妻	Li Junlang's wife Li Xiaoqing's mother
Chen Huihui	Liang Meiyun 梁美云	Lan Haifeng's part-time helper Chen Jieming's close friend Gao Haowen's mother Suffers from severe depression Revealed as murderer of Li Xiaoqing and had "spiked" Lan Haifeng's food all the while in episodes 2-3 (Hospitalized - episode 3)
Ryan Lian 廖永谊	Adam Teo ✘	Eliminated as suspect Xu Guifeng's ex-husband who has become a pimp and stripped Junyan
Louis Wu 伍洛毅	Tang Zhenguo 汤振国 ✘	In-line skating instructor who previously worked for Li Junlang; Eliminated as suspect as there is not enough time for him to kill Li Xiaoqing
Justin Peng 彭修轩	Chen Jieming 陈杰明	Rainbow Charity volunteer Liang Meiyun's close friend Mentally Unstable
Shannon Zann 苏仪珍	Xu Guifeng 许桂凤	Adam Teo's ex-wife who currently works as a beer lady
Jay Goh Jun Hui 吴俊辉	Gao Haowen 高浩文 †	Liang Meiyun's son University student Admired Xu Qingqing; Died after committing suicide (Deceased - 2007)

==== Familicide (灭门惨案) ====
Cast	Character	Description
郑开怀	Zheng Pinghe 郑平和	Psychiatrist; Liang Meiyun's doctor Zheng Caifa and Song Lizhu's son Youngest brother of deceased siblings Wenkang, Tingting and Wenkai; Zheng Caishun's nephew Hirer of the case, almost dropped out because of Lizhu and Caishun
Lina Ng	Song Lizhu 宋丽珠 ✘	Zheng Caifa's wife who was abused by him Zheng Caishun's sister-in-law Zheng Wenkang's foster mother Zheng Tingting, Zheng Wenkai and Zheng Pinghe's mother Blood type A Eliminated as suspect due to height considerations
Zhang Xinxiang	Zheng Caifa 郑财发 †	Bookie; Song Lizhu's husband who often abused her Zheng Caishun's elder brother Zheng Tingting and Zheng Wenkai's father Blood type O Slashed to death by Caishun, when he refused to pay Wu Yalong the winning bet and humiliated him (Deceased - 7 June 1988)
Wang Yuqing	Zheng Caishun 郑财顺	Provision shop owner Zheng Caifa's younger brother Song Lizhu's brother-in-law Zheng Wenkang, Zheng Tingting, Zheng Wenkai and Zheng Pinghe's uncle Admits he is the murderer, and ended his life by pleading for Lizhu and Pinghe's forgiveness and slashing his throat (Deceased - episode 5–6)
Alston Yeo 杨峻毅	Zheng Wenkang 郑文康 †	Zheng Caifa and Li Meijiao's eldest son Song Lizhu's adoptive son Zheng Tingting and Zheng Wenkai's elder brother Blood type B Slashed to death by Caishun when he found out he killed his father (Deceased - 7 June 1988)
陈静雯	Zheng Tingting 郑婷婷 †	Zheng Caifa and Song Lizhu's younger daughter Zheng Wenkang's younger sister Zheng Wenkai's elder sister Blood type O Suffocated to death when she and Wenkai were squeezed by Caishun (Deceased - 7 June 1988)
Justin Lim Ye Teng 林业腾	Zheng Wenkai 郑文凯 †	Zheng Caifa and Song Lizhu's younger son Zheng Wenkang and Zheng Tingting's younger brother Blood type O Suffocated to death when he and Tingting were squeezed by Caishun (Deceased - 7 June 1988)
周全喜	Master Yang 杨爷	Original name Yang Zhengye (杨振业); Bai Qingxiong's ex-superior in the police force Investigator of the case Adult version portrayed by 何培斌
Alan Yeo Thiam Hock 杨添福	Wu Yalong 吴亚龙 ✘	One-legged Long (独脚龙); Suspect; Has a criminal record Previously placed a bet with Zheng Caifa; Currently works as a coffeeshop cleaner
云秀莲	Old lady 老妇	Ex-neighbour of the Zheng family who lived for 30 years
陈凤凌	Li Meijiao 李妹娇	Ex-neighbour of the Zheng family Incurred a debt from loansharks, later paid by Haifeng; Zheng Wenkang's biological mother
Lin Mingzhe 林明哲	Chen Zhihan 陈志汉 ✘	Member of Ang Meng Tong; Song Lizhu's alibi and lover Nursing home patient Suffers from dementia Eliminated as suspect, as he attended Hong Jinchi's mother's funeral at the time of the incident
云昌凑	Hong Jinchi 洪金池	Leader of a secret society Ang Meng Tong in the 70s to 80s

==== Couple's Suicide Pact (殉情悬案) ====
Cast	Character	Description
Hong Ling 洪凌	Momoko Bai Xue Er 白雪儿	Society of Paranormal Activities (SPA) member Possessed by Julie in the police station, and was hence arrested by the police due to her involvement with the couple's suicide pact Was eliminated as suspect as an hotel employee Alan saw her at the hotel, hence being released from jail See Supporting Cast
Ian Fang 方伟杰	Derrick Chen Guohui 陈国辉	Daredevil Derrick; SPA member and Professional magician Murderer of Fang Kailun, Anthony and Julie; Was blackmailed by Anthony after Fang Kailun's murder in the Halloween party in 2012, and hence schemed to kill Anthony; Was revealed as the murderer and arrested (Arrested - episode 9)
Fang Rong 符芳榕	Julie Zhou Jiayi 周嘉怡 †	Anthony's girlfriend Murdered by Derrick in Anthony's condominium bedroom when she found out Anthony was killed Possessed Momoko in the police station (Deceased - 31 October 2013)
Louis C. Hillyard	Anthony Zhou Huaiming 周怀铭 †	SPA's founder and ex-member Julie's boyfriend Used a glove that was used for murdering Fang Kailun to blackmail Derrick and pay off his $30,000 soccer bet Murdered by Derrick after Derrick spiked his red wine with sleeping pills and was suffocated to death (Deceased - 31 October 2013)
Leron Heng 王丽蓉	Joyce	SPA member who went with Momoko and Ben to the haunted house
Fraser Tiong 张家奇	Ben	SPA member who went with Momoko and Joyce to the haunted house Recorded the intuition of Momoko and uploaded it to the SPA blog
Sheila Tan 陈玮甜	Mandy He Huiping 何惠萍 ✘	Works at a floral shop SPA's founder Julie and Anthony's close friend Eliminated as suspect as she had entered Anthony's apartment after Anthony and Julie died
王俊雄	Gary Zhang Zuyao 张祖耀 ✘	Works at his family-run TCM clinic SPA's founder One of the suspects, later cleared of suspections. Admitted that he sexually harassed Julie and was arrested by police.
Tommy Wong 王昌黎	Zhou Donghai 周东海	Anthony's father; objected to Anthony and Julie being together and cut off his financial support Hirer of the case
蔡韵君	Julie's Ma; Julie妈	Julie's mother; uses Julie's old handphone Like Zhou Donghai, she also objected to Julie and Anthony being together

==== Corpseless Kidnap (无尸撕票案) ====
Cast	Character	Description
Rebecca Lim 林慧玲	Huang Yuyang 黄渝阳	Hirer of the case, later revealed that she is not Huang Deliang's biological daughter See Cold Case Investigators (CCI)
Pan Lingling 潘玲玲	He Xiulian 何秀莲	Huang Deliang's wife See Supporting Cast
Seth Ang 翁兴昂	Huang Deliang 黄德良	He Xiulian's husband Huang Yuyang's foster father Fang Musen and Wang Antai's friend Went on a business trip with Fang Musen, incurred a debt and offended a gang member Killed by Fang Musen after staging a kidnap Was revealed that he is not Huang Yuyang's biological father in episode 12 (Deceased - 25 October 1998)
Andi Lim 林伟文	Fang Musen 方木森	Cai Huixin's husband Huang Deliang and Wang Antai's friend Went on a business trip with Huang Deliang, incurred a debt and offended a gang member Killed Huang Deliang after staging a kidnap, went to Thailand and changed his name and looks
Joy Yak 易凌	Cai Huixin 蔡慧心	Fang Musen's wife
Li Wenhai 李文海	Pachai 帕猜	Sponsor of the dance school Hails from Thailand; Reveals he is Fang Musen in episode 11; Ran over and killed by Wang Kunxing's car after attempting to flee from the crime scene reconstruction (Deceased - episode 12)
欧宗强	Insurance agent 保险经纪	Peace Insurance agent Represented the insurance company to hire CCI in verifying Pacai's true identity
Brandon Wong 黄炯耀	Wang Kunxing 王昆兴	Communicated with a mystery man over Pacai's whereabouts, so as to kill him See Supporting Cast
张华珉	Panda Cheng 熊猫成	Original name Li Guocheng (李国成); Works at a coffee-shop Smuggled Huang Deliang and Fang Musen to a forest in Singapore in 1998; both of them were quarreling

==== Floating Partial Body (半截浮尸案) ====
Cast	Character	Description
David Leong 梁家豪	Lin Dawei 林大卫	Doctor; Feng Xinmei's husband Used the watermelon evocation method to bring Xinmei back Hirer of the case Has two extramarital affairs with Jiang Ying and a fourth party Tempted to get Xinmei's mother's assets, but is revealed in episode 15
Esther Low 刘慧娴	Feng Xinmei 冯欣梅	"Heart-to-Heart" columnist Lin Dawei's wife Left home and went missing over Lin Dawei's extramarital affair Jiang Ying's rival in love Kidnapped by Wang Rifa and suffocated to death by Jiang Ying in a wooden hut (Deceased - 15 March 2011)
朱玉叶	Xinmei's mother 欣梅母	Feng Xinmei's mother Hospital patient Used the watermelon evocation method to bring Xinmei back Learned of Lin Dawei's extramarital affairs and motive in episode 15
譚丽芳	Aunt Wang 旺婶	Yamamoto Atsuki's assistant at the restaurant Uncle Wang's wife Wang Zhiwei's mother
符和增	Uncle Wang 旺叔	Original name Wang Rifa (王日发); Wanted criminal for assault Aunt Wang's husband Wang Zhiwei's father Jiang Ying's accomplice in murder Turned himself in in the end (Arrested - episode 14)
Joey Feng 冯瑾瑜	Jiang Ying 江盈	Lin Dawei's assistant/lover Feng Xinmei's rival in love Revealed to have murdered Feng Xinmei and dumped her body in the sea, then feigned Feng Xinmei's suicide. Arrested in the end (Arrested - episode 14)
Nigel Chung 张证杨	Wang Zhiwei 旺志伟	Uncle Wang and Aunt Wang's son National Schools Mathematical Olympiad Champion

==== Jewellery Robbery (金庄抢劫案) ====
Cast	Character	Description
卢冠耀	Bao Lemin 宝乐民	Bao Rui Xiang Jewellery fourth-generation successor Hirer of the case Bao Jianbang's son Guo Jinkai's primary school classmate Indirectly caused the family to lose the family heirloom, Jade Peacock; Younger version portrayed by Albert Eu (余泳德)
Zhang Wei 張為	Guo Zhenshan 郭振山	Founder of Guo Transport; Guo Jinkai's father Appears in the private collector's exhibition Revealed he is Snail in episode 17 and swopped Jade Peacock
Tony Kim Ju Gong 金举拱	Bao Jianbang 宝建邦	Bao Rui Xiang Jewellery third-generation successor Bao Jianye and Bao Ruzhen's eldest brother Bao Lemin's father Shot by Lin Dayong on 25 February 1974 while trying to protect the family heirloom, Jade Peacock (Deceased)
陳斯倫	Bao Jianye 宝建业	Bao Rui Xiang Jewellery third-generation successor Bao Jianbang's younger brother Bao Ruzhen's elder brother Bao Lexuan's father Witnessed Bao Jianbang in cahoots with Lin Dayong (Deceased)
Zhu Xiufeng 朱秀凤	Bao Ruzhen 宝如珍	Bao Rui Xiang Jewellery third-generation successor Bao Jianbang and Bao Jianye's younger sister Saw Bao Jianbang with another woman Adult version portrayed by Ho Ai Ling (何爱玲)
盧佳俊	Lin Dayong 林大勇	Mastermind of the Robbery; Wild Boar and Snail's boss Robbed Bao Rui Xiang Jewellery on 25 February 1974; Died after being shot by the police, after revealing that someone close to him had taken away the Jade Peacock (Deceased - 9 March 1974)
Vincent Tee 池素宝	Wild Boar 山猪	Original name Zheng Fushan (郑福山); Street performer Repeat offender Lin Dayong and Snail's accomplice in crime Jailed 10 years for committing the robbery at Bao Rui Xiang Jewellery; jailed 10 more times for repeat offences Adult version portrayed by CKay Lim 林志强
Jasper Lai 赖奕翰	Snail 蜗牛	Original name Guo Ah Niu (郭阿牛); Lin Dayong and Wild Boar's accomplice in crime Swapped the Jade Peacock after robbing Bao Rui Xiang Jewellery; Jailed 10 years for committing the robbery, went to Hong Kong and Malaysia upon his release and changed his name
Kelly Lim LT 林俐廷	Bao Lexuan 宝乐萱	Bao Rui Xiang Jewellery fourth-generation CEO; Bao Jianye's daughter Bao Lemin's cousin
Zhou Quanxi 周全喜	Master Yang 杨爷	Fired the shot at Lin Dayong on 9 March 1974; See Familicide

==== Missing Children (失踪奇案) ====
Cast	Character	Description
Tracer Wong 王裕香	Xie Meigui 谢玫瑰	Xie Qicong's mother Hirer of the case, but later dropped out of the search
陈志光	Wu Hanwen 吴汉文	Wu Meiwei's father Liu Yanyan's husband Zhao Caixia's ex-husband Hirer of the case
Johnny Ng 黄家强	Janitor Jiang 蒋校工	Janitor of Xin Chuan Primary School; Jiang Xiaodong's father
Ivan Lo 卢楷浚	Xie Qicong 谢启聪	Blue School Bag (蓝色书包); Xie Meigui's son Xin Chuan Primary School student Wu Meiwei's classmate Taken away by an "alien" (Yamamoto Atsuki) after she ushered him and Meiwei inside a spaceship at the carnival on 19 July 2006; Was sent by Yamamoto Atsuki to Zhao Caixia upon arriving Malaysia a day later Works at the garden in Cameron Highlands; Xiaowei (Wu Meiwei)'s boyfriend Died due to brain cancer and pneumonia (Deceased - episode 19)
刘哲杨	Taro 太郎	Blue School Bag (蓝色书包); Xie Meigui's son Xin Chuan Primary School student Wu Meiwei's classmate Taken away by an "alien" (Yamamoto Atsuki) after she ushered him and Meiwei inside a spaceship at the carnival on 19 July 2006; Was sent by Yamamoto Atsuki to Zhao Caixia upon arriving Malaysia a day later Works at the garden in Cameron Highlands; Xiaowei (Wu Meiwei)'s boyfriend Died due to brain cancer and pneumonia (Deceased - episode 19)
周情依	Wu Meiwei 吴美薇	Wu Hanwen and Zhao Caixia's daughter Liu Yanyan's adoptive daughter Xin Chuan Primary School student Xie Qicong's classmate Taken away by an "alien" (Yamamoto Atsuki) after she ushered her and Qicong inside a spaceship at the carnival on 19 July 2006; Works at the garden in Cameron Highlands; Taro (Xie Qicong)'s girlfriend
Uncredited	Xiaowei 小薇	Wu Hanwen and Zhao Caixia's daughter Liu Yanyan's adoptive daughter Xin Chuan Primary School student Xie Qicong's classmate Taken away by an "alien" (Yamamoto Atsuki) after she ushered her and Qicong inside a spaceship at the carnival on 19 July 2006; Works at the garden in Cameron Highlands; Taro (Xie Qicong)'s girlfriend
Aloysius Pang 冯伟衷	Jiang Xiaodong 蒋肖冬	Janitor Jiang's son Diagnosed with autism Saw the missing children taken away by an "alien" (Yamamoto Atsuki); See Supporting Cast
朱爱华	Zhao Caixia 赵彩霞	Receptionist at the dance school Wu Hanwen's ex-wife Wu Meiwei's mother Yamamoto Atsuki and Liu Yanyan's classmate at the cooking class Assisted Atsuki in taking Qicong and Meiwei Turned herself into the police (Arrested-Episode 20)
Chen Hanwei 陈汉玮	Bai Qingxiong 白庆雄	Xie Qicong's father See Cold Case Investigators (CCI)
陶樱	Liu Yanyan 刘燕燕	Wu Hanwen's wife Wu Meiwei's foster mother Yamamoto Atsuki and Zhao Caixia's classmate at the cooking class
Lynn Poh 傅芳儀	Yamamoto Atsuki 山本秋月	Zhao Caixia and Liu Yanyan's classmate at the cooking class Xie Qicong's best friend Took Xie Qicong and Wu Meiwei away to Malaysia with Zhao Caixia; Turned herself in to the police and shut down her restaurant in the end, not before revealing she sent Qicong away to protect Qingxiong's career (Arrested - episode 20); See Supporting Cast

==== Sudden Mysterious Death (神秘猝死案) ====
Cast	Character	Description
Cansen Goh 吴开深	Xu Jiaqiang 许家强	Hong Junyan's uncle-cum-stepfather Killed Guiquan by injecting drugs to him as ordered by Kunxing killed by an explosion, planted by Kunxing after he Kunxing kidnapped him (Deceased - Episode 22)
Hu Wensui 胡问遂	Hong Guiquan 洪贵权	Hong Junyan's father Liu Shujuan's husband Involved in a bribery case Died a mysterious death (Deceased - 24 April 2000)
黄曼玲	Liu Shujuan 李淑娟	Hong Junyan's mother Hong Guiquan's wife (Deceased - 2 years ago)
叶进华	Qiu Liren 邱立仁	Received a bribe from Hong Guiquan and Xu Jiaqiang; Yang Yujiao's husband (Arrested - episode 21)
Cat Ang 翁慧霖	Yang Yujiao 杨玉娇	Laboratory head of the Health Sciences Authority; Qiu Liren's wife (Arrested - episode 21)
Desmond Tan	Hong Junyan 洪俊焱	Suffers from a long-standing hearing problem Unable to accept Xu Jiaqiang as stepfather and plunged into water in the bathtub on 29 April 2000; See Cold Case Investigators (CCI)
Seth Ang 翁兴昂	Huang Deliang 黄德良	Hong Guiquan and Xu Jiaqiang's friend See Corpseless Kidnap
Andi Lim 林伟文	Fang Musen 方木森	Hong Guiquan and Xu Jiaqiang's friend See Corpseless Kidnap

== Episodes ==
No.	Title	Original release date
1	"Episode 1"	April 28, 2016
2	"Episode 2"	April 29, 2016
3	"Episode 3"	May 2, 2016
4	"Episode 4"	May 3, 2016
5	"Episode 5"	May 4, 2016
6	"Episode 6"	May 5, 2016
7	"Episode 7"	May 6, 2016
8	"Episode 8"	May 9, 2016
9	"Episode 9"	May 10, 2016
10	"Episode 10"	May 11, 2016
11	"Episode 11"	May 12, 2016
12	"Episode 12"	May 13, 2016
13	"Episode 13"	May 16, 2016
14	"Episode 14"	May 17, 2016
15	"Episode 15"	May 18, 2016
16	"Episode 16"	May 19, 2016
17	"Episode 17"	May 20, 2016
18	"Episode 18"	May 23, 2016
19	"Episode 19"	May 24, 2016
20	"Episode 20"	May 25, 2016
21	"Episode 21"	May 26, 2016
22	"Episode 22"	May 27, 2016
23	"Episode 23"	May 30, 2016

== Original soundtrack ==
Song title	Performer
白光棱镜	Lin Si Tong 林思彤
嚼士	Lin Si Tong 林思彤 and Yeo Min 杨敏
Killer Boy	Ferlyn Wong

== Accolades ==
Organisation	Year	Category	Nominee(s)	Result	Ref
Star Awards	2017	Best Screenplay	Ng Kah Huay 黄佳华 and Cheong Yan Ping 张彦平	Won	

== See also ==
- List of MediaCorp Channel 8 Chinese drama series (2010s)
