= Reebonz =

Online platform for buying and selling luxury products

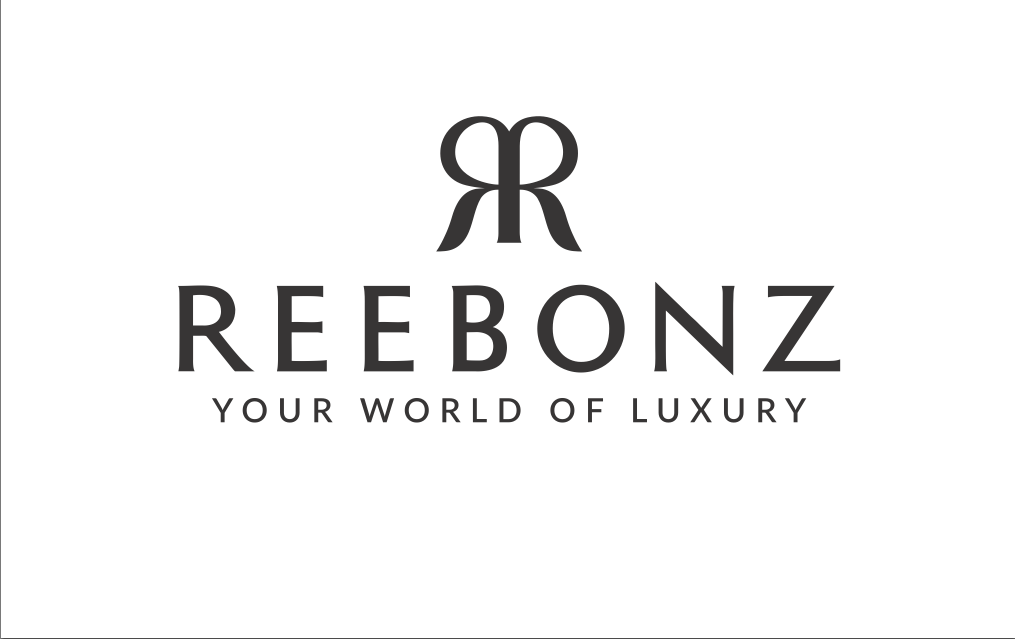
- Company type: Private
- Industry: E-commerce
- Founded: March 2009; 17 years ago
- Founders: Samuel Lim, Daniel Lim, Benjamin Han
- Headquarters: Singapore
- Website: http://www.reebonz.com

Reebonz was an online platform for buying and selling luxury products. Members could shop for new and used luxury merchandise.

Reebonz targeted customers in the Asia-Pacific region. It is established in Southeast Asia, operating in eight countries including Singapore, Malaysia, Indonesia, Taiwan, Hong Kong, Thailand, Australia, and South Korea.

== History ==
Samuel Lim, Daniel Lim, and Benjamin Han co-founded Reebonz in March 2009. Prior to Reebonz, Samuel Lim founded South East Asia’s Fusion Mobile, in his first year of university in 2000. In 2004, he founded another line of business under eFusion Solutions Pte Ltd called Fusion Direct. Benjamin Han and Daniel Lim started in e-commerce with the launch of Zuunbo.com in 2007. Zunnbo.com was awarded seed funding by the Singapore Management University (SMU) Business Innovation Generator, which manages the Entrepreneurial Talent Development Fund together with SPRING Singapore for investing in promising business proposals.

In August 2021, Daniel Lim left the company.

In September 2021, Samuel Lim alerted creditors that Reebonz is "in creditors' voluntary liquidation". Lim explained in the notice that Reebonz "cannot by reason of its liabilities continue its business".

In December 2021, it was announced that LiveCommerceEntertainment (LCE) had acquired Reebonz.com brand assets. LCE relaunched the website as ReebonzLIVE!.

== Products and services ==
=== Sell and Consign ===
In April 2014, Reebonz.com merged with Reebonz Vintage to sell used designer items.

==== Closets ====
Launched in January 2015, Closets was the mobile selling platform in the Reebonz app that sold used designer items, and it had a live chat function.

=== Marketplace ===
In May 2015, Marketplace was launched as a global portal for merchants to list rare luxury fashion items for Reebonz members.

==== White Glove ====
White Glove was a concierge service where Reebonz helped members sell their pre-owned designer items.

=== Reebonz Atelier ===
Provided services such as authentication, valuation, restoring, and repairing.

=== Mobile applications ===
Reebonz launched its mobile application for iPhone and iPad in 2010, and later for Android in July 2012.

=== Reebonz SPACE ===
In September 2011, Reebonz launched its "retail lounge", Reebonz SPACE.

=== Reebonz Mobil ===
In May 2011, Reebonz launched Reebonz Mobil, a 40-foot-long mobile truck version of its online flash sales concept.

== Awards and recognition ==
=== 2012 ===
NTV7 MY’s The Breakfast Show featured Reebonz.

Cosmopolitan SG awarded the 2012 Cosmo Webby Award for Best Site for Luxury Handbags to Reebonz.

=== 2013 ===
In early 2013, Singapore's media giant, MediaCorp, signed on as lead investor in a round of fund-raising by Reebonz. The round raised a total of S$50 million from MediaCorp and existing shareholders. This brings Reebonz's market valuation to cross the $250M mark. This is the first time MediaCorp has invested in an online retail firm.

=== 2014 ===
Reebonz was featured in Luxe Asia of Channel NewsAsia
