= C.L.I.F. 4 =

Singaporean TV series

- 警徽天职4
- Genre: Police procedural Action; Thriller
- Written by: Tang Yeow; Seah Choon Guan
- Directed by: Sam Loh; Oh Liang Cai; Martin Chan
- Starring: Li Nanxing; Rui En; Zhang Yaodong; Elvin Ng; Ya Hui
- Opening theme: "奉陪到底" by Ric
- Ending theme: "奉陪到底" by Ric
- Country of origin: Singapore
- Original languages: Mandarin, with some English dialogue
- No. of episodes: 20 (list of episodes)

Production
- Executive producer: Chong Liung Man
- Running time: approx. 45 minutes

Original release
- Network: Mediacorp Channel 8
- Release: 6 September – 3 October 2016

Related
- C.L.I.F. (2011); C.L.I.F. 2 (2013); C.L.I.F. 3 (2014); C.L.I.F. 5 (2019)

C.L.I.F. 4
- Traditional Chinese: 警徽天職4
- Simplified Chinese: 警徽天职4
Transcriptions
Standard Mandarin
- Hanyu Pinyin: Jǐng Huī Tiān Zhí 4

C.L.I.F. 4 (Chinese: 警徽天职4, short-form for Courage, Loyalty, Integrity, Fairness, commonly pronounced as cliff) is a Singaporean police procedural series produced and telecast on MediaCorp Channel 8 in collaboration with the Singapore Police Force. The series stars Li Nanxing, Rui En, Zhang Yaodong, Elvin Ng, and Ya Hui as the main characters of the series. The series is co-sponsored by Sheng Siong Supermarkets and Soon Bee Huat. This is also the first C.L.I.F. series to feature a VSC police officer.

== Cast ==
=== Main cast ===
- Li Nanxing as ASP Wee Lum Thiam (魏蓝天), Ng Tze Keat's husband and Matthew Wee's father.
  - Edwin Goh portrayed a young Wee

Cast	Role	Description
Rui En	Ng Tze Keat (黄芷婕)	INSP Ng Tze Keat: OC Team C at Special Investigation Section, CID.; Wee Lum Thiam's wife.; Matthew Wee's Mother.; Prejudice against Chan Yu's impulsive personality.; Often quarrel with Wee Lum Thiam.; Was peeped at by a woman-in-disguise inside the toilet cubicle in Episode 1.; House broken into in Episode 11.; Indirectly caused the death of Hu Xianghai in Episode 13.; Diverted to the Home Team Academy as Instructor.
Zhang Yaodong	Chan Yu (陈宇)	Main Antagonist; INSP Chan Yu; Hitman: Team Leader at Airport Police Division.; Later transfer to Special Investigation Section, CID as an IO.; Ng Tze Keat's subordinate.; Tsai Yen Chi's ex-boyfriend.; In love with Ong Shishi.; Teo Xiufeng's son.; Teo Hark Wee's nephew.; Nabbed a voyeur at the Airport in Episode 1.; Transferred to CID in Episode 2.; Reprimanded by Ng Tze Keat for acting on his own in Episode 3.; Accidentally pushed Hu Shijian down the sea and killed Zhou Guorong in impulse 5 years ago.; Resigned as a police officer in Episode 15 to help Hark Wee in laundering money while helping Lum Thiam to investigate on Xuewei.; Purposely kissed Tsai Yen Chi in front of Ong Shishi.; Broke up with Ong Shishi in Episode 19.; Killed Teo Hark Wee and Ruoting in Episode 20, later sabotaged Wee Lum Thiam for murdering Teo Hark Wee.; Saved Ong Shishi in Episode 20.; Committed suicide by cop by getting shot by Tze Keat and her team in Episode 20.
Elvin Ng	Teo Kwee Xiang (张贵祥)	SSSGT Teo Kwee Xiang: NPC Community Policing Unit (CPU) Officer from J Division.; Eng Xuan Bee's boyfriend, later husband.; Ong Shishi's colleague.; Liang Dexun's friend and benefactor.; Accused by Eng Xuan Bee of visiting a prostitute in Episode 2.; Quarreled with Eng Xuan Bee in Episode 3.; Followed Amy to where she and Ah Song had abducted Eng Xuan Bee and managed to save Eng Xuan Bee.; Proposed to Eng Xuan Bee in Episode 10 and 20 respectively.
Ya Hui	Ong Shishi (王诗诗)	SGT Ong Shi Shi: IO in J Division.; Teo Kwee Xiang's colleague.; Tsai Yen Chi's best friend.; Chan Yu's love interest.; Moved in with Tsai Yen Chi as a tenant.; Broke up with Chan Yu when she saw him and Tsai Yen Chi kissing in the car in Episode 19.; Abducted by Ruoting and saved by Chan Yu in Episode 20.
Sora Ma	Eng Xuan Bee (翁选美)	Jelly, Eng Suan Bee: Teo Kwee Xiang's girlfriend, later wife.; Works in a salon.; Accused Teo Kwee Xiang of finding a prostitute in Episode 2.; Decided to quit her night job as a singer in Episode 3.; Agreed to Teo Kwee Xiang's marriage in Episode 10, later reject due to her illness in later part.; Was brutally assaulted by Zen and led to stroke on the right face in Episode 15.; Diagnosed with epilepsy in Episode 18.; Abducted by Amy and Ah Song, later head stabbed by a wall nail in Episode 19.; Finally married Teo Kwee Xiang in Episode 20.
Mei Xin	Tsai Yen Chi (蔡彦琪)	SGT(V) Tsai Yen Chi: Reporter.; Ong Shi Shi's best friend.; Chan Yu's ex-girlfriend.; Zhou Jingze's love interest.; Became a Volunteer Special Constabulary Police Officer in episode 12.; Became a regular police officer (officer cadet) in episode 20.
Yusuke Fukuchi	Zhou Jingze (周井泽)	Taiwanese Interpol officer.; In love with Tsai Yen Chi.; Found out about his father's death in Episode 9.; Hit by another car with Wee Lum Thiam in Episode 20, suffered minor injuries.

=== Other cast ===
Cast	Role	Description	Episodes Appeared
Chen Tianwen	Teo Hark Wee (赵学伟)	Main Villain; Teo Hark Wee: Art gallery boss.; Teo Xiufeng's younger brother.; Chan Yu's uncle.; Yang Zhongzheng's boss.; Shot to death by Chan Yu.	1-4, 6-20
Bonnie Loo	Yang Hongxi (杨红夕)	Student.; Yang Zhongzheng's daughter.; Staying with Wee Lum Thiam and Ng Tze Keat.; Stabbed in Episode 10 but survived.; Knocked down by a van while being chased by Teo Hark Wee's men.	2, 4-6, 8-11, 16-18
Terence Cao	Yang Zhongzheng (杨忠正)	Main Villain From C.L.I.F. 3 (repented); Younger Version Portrayed by Fraser Tiong: Yang Hongxi's father.; Eng Xuan Bee's ex-boyfriend.; Jailed 15 months ago for murder and sentenced to death for his crimes in C.L.I.F. 3.; Wee Lum Thiam's best friend.; Died after having stage 4 pancreatic cancer.	1, 2, 6, 8, 10-11
Liu Kai Xin	Teo Xiufeng (赵秀凤)	Chan Yu's mother.; Teo Hark Wee's elder sister.; Eng Xuan Bee's boss.	1-4, 6-13, 15-17, 19-20
Renfred Ng	Evan Poh	NPC Community Policing Unit (CPU) Officer.; Teo Kwee Xiang's good friend and partner.	1, 3, 6, 9, 10, 11, 14-15, 18-20
Zong Zijie	Liang Dexun (梁德迅)	Liang Zhixiong's son.; Teo Kwee Xiang's friend.; Staying with Teo Kwee Xiang.; Mixed with gangsters after his father went to prison.; Repented after being given a warning.; Going to be enlisted for National Service as mentioned by Teo Kwee Xiang in Episode 13.	3-7, 9, 11, 13, 15, 17
Sunny Pang	Liang Zhixiong (梁志雄)	Liang Dexun's father.; Arrested in Episode 7 for the gruesome murders of 2 pub ladies and attempted murder of Xuan Bee.	3-7
Xavier Ong	Zen	Skateboard molester.; Molested and then assaulted Xuan Bee using skateboard and caused her to be half-paralyzed in Episode 15.	15-16
Grace Teo	Fang Ruoting (方若婷)	Supporting Villain; Vanessa: Teo Hark Wee's assistant.; Injured in Episode 16.; Shot in the leg by Tze Keat in Episode 16.; Kidnapped Shishi in Episode 20.; Shot by Chan Yu while attacking him.	8-17, 20

== Development ==
The series was first announced to be under planning in 2016. Prior to the announcement, Elvin Ng mentioned that he will return for the fourth installment after he is done with the filming of If Only I Could, and Li Nanxing also mentioned that he will return for the series. In the House of Fortune press conference in January 2016, it was also announced that Ya Hui will be playing a cop in the series. On 23 February 2016, Li and Ng, together with the latest additions Zhang Yaodong, Ya Hui, and Mei Xin attended a weapon training session at the Home Team Academy to prepare for the series; Rui En was absent as she was unwell. Imaging sessions were done in March, where Ng revealed a collaboration with Rui En in a L'Oréal commercial.

Bonnie Loo, who plays Yang Zhongzheng's daughter Hongxi, and ex-infotainment host Liu Kaixin hosted the lensing ceremony, held on 24 March 2016. Some of the cast members revealed that they diligently went to great lengths to prepare themselves for their roles by picking up a sport, or resuming their exercise regimes. They also talked about their brush with the law. It was also revealed that Yang Zhongzheng (Terence Cao) will die in the series and his funeral is filmed at Mount Vernon on 29 April.

A press conference was held at the Ministry of Home Affairs, New Phoenix Park on 23 August 2016. Li Nanxing, Elvin Ng, Sora Ma, Zhang Yaodong, Ya Hui, Mei Xin, Chen Tianwen, Yusuke Fukuchi, and Bonnie Loo attended the conference. Notably absent was Rui En, who was in New Zealand to spend time with her father. A meet-and-greet session was held on 3 September at One KM Mall. Elvin Ng, Ya Hui, Sora Ma, Mei Xin, Chen Tianwen, Terence Cao, and Bonnie Loo were present at the event. The first 150 audience to form the queue for the event got to receive an autographed poster and a goodie bag each.

== Incident ==
On 13 April 2016, Rui En was involved in a car accident entering a carpark near her home when her car knocked over a stationary motorcycle. On 14 April, it was reported that Rui En was assisting the police with investigations into the accident. She subsequently apologised and responded with an official statement regarding the accident. The owner of the motorcycle accepted Rui En's apology through Wanbao on 15 April. For this incident, Rui En was fined S$700.

Responding to media queries, executive producer Chong Liung Man said that they have no intention of replacing her or her character in the drama. Rui En showed up for work as usual on that day, but he gave her a day off as he was worried that she might not be in the most ideal state for shooting.

== Potential sequel ==
Chong Liung Man shared that doing a sequel was "something the team strived towards to during C.L.I.F. 3". In a separate interview, he said, "When I was filming part 3, I told them the mission is to have a part 4. Now that it has succeeded, we’d have to wait for a few more years before knowing if part 5 will happen." He added that the drama's aim is to develop the characters and their back stories to make them more relatable and touching.

Chong also expressed interest in doing a Singapore Army drama, if given the opportunity to shoot a similar drama about a different uniform group in Singapore, adding that "it has been a long time since we last did a proper drama about the army in MediaCorp."

== Episodes ==
No. overall	No. in season	Title	Original release date
66	1	"Episode 1"	September 6, 2016; PG Some Violence
67	2	"Episode 2"	September 7, 2016; PG Some Disturbing Scenes
68	3	"Episode 3"	September 8, 2016; PG Some Disturbing Scenes
69	4	"Episode 4"	September 9, 2016; PG Some Disturbing Scenes
70	5	"Episode 5"	September 12, 2016; PG Some Sexual References
71	6	"Episode 6"	September 13, 2016; PG Some Disturbing Scenes
72	7	"Episode 7"	September 14, 2016; PG Some Violence
73	8	"Episode 8"	September 15, 2016; PG Some Disturbing Scenes
74	9	"Episode 9"	September 16, 2016; PG Some Violence
75	10	"Episode 10"	September 19, 2016; PG Some Disturbing Scenes
76	11	"Episode 11"	September 20, 2016; PG Some Disturbing Scenes
77	12	"Episode 12"	September 21, 2016; PG Some Violence
78	13	"Episode 13"	September 22, 2016; PG Some Violence
79	14	"Episode 14"	September 23, 2016; PG Some Violence
80	15	"Episode 15"	September 26, 2016; PG Some Violence
81	16	"Episode 16"	September 27, 2016; PG Some Disturbing Scenes
82	17	"Episode 17"	September 28, 2016; PG Some Disturbing Scenes
83	18	"Episode 18"	September 29, 2016; PG Some Disturbing Scenes
84	19	"Episode 19"	September 30, 2016; PG Some Disturbing Scenes
85	20	"Episode 20 (Finale)"	October 3, 2016; PG Some Violence

== Accolades ==
Year	Organisation	Category	Nominee(s)	Result	Ref
2017	Star Awards	Best Director	Martin Chan	Won	
2017	Star Awards	Best Drama Serial	—N/a	Nominated	

== See also ==
- When Duty Calls
