= The Dream Job =

- 绝世好工
- Genre: Drama
- Created by: Lee Ji-wah; Suen Hou Hou
- Story by: Cheong Yan Peng; Lim Gim Lan
- Directed by: Doreen Yap; Joe Ma; Gao Xiu Hui; Loh Woon Woon
- Starring: Hugo Ng; Shaun Chen; Jeanette Aw; Rebecca Lim; Zhang Zhenhuan; Ian Fang; Aileen Tan; Pan Lingling
- Opening theme: 年轮 by Jim Lim and Chew Sin Huey
- Ending theme: 1) 从彼此的世界路过 by Pierre Zhang; 2) 学会 by Tay Kewei; 3)假裝不了 by Derrick Hoh
- Country of origin: Singapore
- Original language: Chinese
- No. of episodes: 30

Production
- Executive producer: Leong Lye Lin
- Production locations: Singapore; Australia, Perth
- Running time: approx. 45 minutes (exc. advertisements)

Original release
- Network: Mediacorp Channel 8
- Release: 28 June – 8 August 2016

The Dream Job (Chinese: 绝世好工) is a Singaporean drama produced and telecast on Mediacorp Channel 8. The series stars Shaun Chen, Jeanette Aw, Rebecca Lim, Zhang Zhenhuan, Ian Fang, Aileen Tan, Pan Lingling and Hong Kong veteran actor, Hugo Ng, as the main cast.

== Cast ==
=== Main cast ===
| Cast | Character | Description |
|---|---|---|
| 吴岱融 | Zhang Qingdong 张庆东 | Main Protagonist; Owner of Purple Garden Landscaping Teo Keng Tong; A man with two illegitimate children due to his many affairs in the past Liang Yongqiang's distant cousin Love triangle with Lin Melian and Wang Bizhi; Li Junfeng, Cheng Huishan and Lin Zijie's father Zhang Lixing's adopted father Huang Xiumei's son-in-law Li Junfeng and Huang Xiumei's sworn enemy Revealed to have lung cancer in episode 8 Cause the death of Junfeng's grandmother to have Cerebral hemorrhage after Junfeng's grandmother had a tussle with him. Suffered a stroke in episode 19 due to too much heartache. Died after his meet with Junfeng; caused by Zhang Mingde and him engaging in a scuffle (Deceased - Episode 25) |
| Shaun Chen | Li Junfeng / Zhang Junfeng 李俊风 / 张俊枫 | Main Villain But Repented (at the end of the series); Younger version portrayed by Ian Teng (丁翊); Teenage version portrayed by Gary Tan (陈毅丰); Lawyer Lee Choon Feng; Chen Yiqing's boyfriend, broke up on episode 21; Likes Jiang Xinya; Zhang Qingdong and Li Ziyun's son Huang Xiumei's grandson Zhang Lixing, Cheng Huishan and Lin Zijie's half elder brother Despise Zhang Qingdong and plans to avenge his mom |
| Zhang Zhenhuan | Zhang Lixing 张立行 | Teo Lip Heng; Younger version portrayed by Alston Yeo (杨峻毅) |
| Jeanette Aw | Cheng Huishan 程卉杉 | Senior financial consultant Thia Hui Say; Younger version portrayed byTeenage version portrayed by Dora Teo (张淑婷); Wang Bizhi's daughter |
| Rebecca Lim | Jiang Xinya 江欣雅 | Nurse Kang Hiam Nga; Zhang Qingdong's recruited daughter Qiu Xinling's elder sister Li Junfeng and He Jiazheng's love Interest |
| Ian Fang | Lin Zijie 林梓杰 | Lim Chu Kiat Television drama cameo Younger version portrayed by Donald Chong (张俊豪) Lin Meilan's son Zhang Qingdong's recruited son, later revealed as biological Pan Xiaoxue's boyfriend Li Junfeng and Cheng Huishan's half younger brother |
| Aileen Tan | Wang Bizhi 王碧芝 | Cheng Huishan's mother Lin Meilan's rival-in-love, but later reconcile |
| Pan Lingling | Lin Meilan 林美兰 | Nightclub singer Lin Zijie's mother Wang Bizhi's rival-in-love, but later reconcile |

=== Supporting cast ===
| Cast | Character | Description |
|---|---|---|
| Hong Ling | Pan Xiaoxue 潘晓雪 | University student Works at Purple Garden; Uncle Quan's niece Lin Zijie's wife |
| Bonnie Loo | Qiu Xinling 邱欣灵 | Nursing home patient Jiang Xinya's younger sister Paralysed from waist down 2 years ago after being met with an accident |
| Romeo Tan | Tim Goh 吴康顺 | Businessman but later became a criminal, caused by Junfeng; Cheng Huishan's ex-boyfriend Cheng Huishan's business partner for the Grand Corp, planned by Junfeng, in episode 12; Peggy's ex-boyfriend |
| Sheila Sim | Chen Yiqing 陈依晴 | Famous designer Wesley's daughter |
| Lawrence Wong 王冠逸 | Qiu Zhiying 邱致颖 | Earthworm (蚯蚓); Gangster; Qiu Xinling's elder adoptive brother |
| Brandon Wong | Liang Yongqiang 梁永强 | Manager-cum-chef of the restaurant at Purple Garden; Zhang Qingdong's distant cousin |
| Chen Tianwen | Zhang Mingde 张明德 | Gambler; Raped Li Ziyun in the past Zhang Lixing's biological father |

=== Cameo appearance ===
| Cast | Character | Description |
|---|---|---|
| Marcus Mok 莫健发 | Wesley | CEO of The Grand Corp; Richest Man in Singapore; Chen Yiqing's father Forced Yongqiang to worship his feet in episode 12; Attempted to kill Xinya and Xinling by paying someone to car crash them in episode 24; Paid some thugs to beat up Yongqiang; Killed Xinling by paying someone to drop a big flower pot on her in episode 28 (Arrested – Episode 30) |
| Bryan Wong | | Television host Ambassador of The Dream Job Cameo |
| Jeffrey Xu | He Jiazheng 何家政 | Doctor Hoh Ka Cheng; Likes Jiang Xinya; Shortlisted in the second round of The Dream Job recruitments |
| Chen Zhiqiang 陈志强 | Wang Wen Cai 王文财 | Zhang Qingdong's personal assistant |
| Benjamin Heng | Peter | Cheng Huishan's superior, later Tim's superior |
| Louis Wu 伍洛毅 | | Actor in the bed showroom scene |
| Seraph Sun | | Actress in the bed showroom scene |
| Xavier Ong | Taka | Television drama AP; Applicant of The Dream Job |
| Nick Teo | Applicant 应征者 | Applicant of The Dream Job who is shortlisted in the second round of recruitments |
| Alfred Sim | Applicant 应征者 | Applicant of The Dream Job who failed the first round of recruitments |
| Adele Wong | Li Ziyun 李紫芸 (Lee Tze Wan) | Li Junfeng and Zhang Lixing's mother Huang Xiumei's daughter Died after committing suicide (Deceased – 19 years ago) |
| Cansen Goh 吴开深 | Armed man A 匪徒A | Staged an "attack" during the second round of recruitments with Qingdong |
| Chua Cheng Pou 蔡清炮 | Armed man B 匪徒B | Staged an "attack" during the second round of recruitments with Qingdong |
| Dylan Quek 郭景豪 | Benson | Li Junfeng's assistant |
| Hoong Kuo Juey 洪国锐 | Cheng Dayong 程大勇 | Farmer; Cheng Huishan's foster father |
| Jacob Wong 王乐雄 | Bryan | Purple Garden worker |
| Yeo Thiam Hock 杨添福 | Uncle Quan 泉叔 | Purple Garden gardener |
| He Pei Bin 何培斌 | Guorong 国荣 | Purple Garden restaurant worker |
| Zhu Xiufeng | Huang Xiumei 黄秀妹 | Nursing home patient Li Junfeng and Zhang Lixing's maternal grandmother Zhang Qingdong's mother-in-law Li Ziyun's mother |
| Liao Xianghui 廖翔輝 | Group leader 团长 | Elderly tour guide group leader |
| Lin Jiang Yuan 林蒋源 | Elderly A 老翁A | Elderly tour guide group member |
| Ou Meixin 欧美杏 | Elderly B 老妇B | Elderly tour guide group member |
| Yun Xiulian 云秀蓮 | Elderly C 老妇C | Elderly tour guide group member |
| Kayly Loh 卢传瑾 | Peggy | Tim's girlfriend Broke up with Tim in episode 7 |
| Yong Ke Xin 雍可欣 | Julie | Purple Garden worker |
| Lu Weijie 陸韦杰 | Long-ge 龙哥 | Lent Lin Zijie a sum of money, and learnt he has a "billionaire father" at the pub Attacked Li Junfeng and Zhang Lixing in episode 5 when he found out they called the police |
| Xu Jun Yuan 许俊远 | Gary | Li Junfeng's bandmate Invited to perform in Tim and Peggy's wedding in episode 5, but is told it would be the following Saturday in episode 6 |
| Wu Min Wei 吴铭伟 | Band member 乐队成员 | Gary's bandmate Invited to perform in Tim and Peggy's wedding in episode 5, but is told it would be the following Saturday in episode 6 |
| Lin Lihui 林莉惠 | Band member 乐队成员 | Gary's bandmate Invited to perform in Tim and Peggy's wedding in episode 5, but is told it would be the following Saturday in episode 6 |
| Benjamin Khoh 许凱童 | Adam | Purple Garden worker |
| Yu Suhan 余素菡 | Kelly | Purple Garden worker |
| Vincent Tee 池素宝 | Peggy's father Peggy父 | Peggy's father |
| Tan Qiu Hong 陈秋红 | Peggy's mother Peggy母 | Peggy's mother |
| Garett Lim 林家庆 | Sam | |
| Chen Fengling 陈凤凌 | Yiqing's mother 依晴母 | Chen Yiqing's mother Wesley's wife |
| Bunz 包尚泽 | Black Cow 黑牛 | Tried to kidnap Zhang Qingdong with Earthworm |
| Mervyn Ong 王驯凯 | Alfred | |
| William Lawandi 刘峻宏 | Roy | |

== Development ==
First announced in December 2015, the drama series features a strong story plot by maestros behind Hong Kong's mega-hit and award-winning drama Heart of Greed, Lee Ji-wah and Suen Hou Hou. Targeted to reach an extensive audience from family, working women to Professionals, Managers, Executives and Businessmen (PMEBs), the publicity for the drama also on multi-platforms from teaser recruitment ads, on-ground Recruitment Roadshow, Toggle microsite coupled with social media activation, launch trailers on radio channels, Press Conference and Meet and Greet. Major sponsors include Subway, Daikin, Mama Magica and Simmons.

Imaging sessions were done in the month of December 2015. New daddy Shaun Chen plays a lawyer who sets out to take revenge against a father he grew up hating. This is his first role after his Star Awards 2015 Best Actor win, not before he completed filming The Journey: Our Homeland, and his second onscreen couple collaboration with Best Actress Rebecca Lim, after The Dream Makers. On the other hand, Jeanette Aw plays an ambitious, driven career woman, which was different from the other roles she has portrayed over the years. In a Toggle interview, she said, "I used to play characters with gentle exteriors but tough personalities, but for Huishan it’s the opposite. She doesn’t display her weaknesses or tell anyone of the difficulties she faces." Hong Kong veteran actor, Hugo Ng, who played in Singaporean dramas Takeover and Men of Valour in the 1980s, returns to Singapore screens for the drama, playing a wealthy businessman who hires the characters of Aw, Rebecca Lim and Ian Fang as his son and daughters. He and his family returned to Singapore, as his son will be enlisted for National Service the following year.

The drama held its soft launch on 26 January 2016, one month after filming commenced. Hugo Ng, Shaun Chen, Jeanette Aw, Rebecca Lim, Zhang Zhenhuan, Ian Fang, Aileen Tan, Pan Lingling, Romeo Tan, Sheila Sim, Hong Ling, Brandon Wong, Bonnie Loo and Chen Tianwen were present at the event. The cast also shared their first jobs at the launch. The production crew and cast (Shaun Chen, Aw, Lim and Zhang), together with the Toggle reporting crew, head to Perth on 18 March for a week of filming. Toggle made live reports throughout their stint. The cast also provided their experiences while filming for the show on Fridays, beginning from 20 May. Back in Singapore, filming for Cheng Huishan and Zhang Lixing (played by Aw and Zhang)'s wedding was on 28 March. Shaun Chen disclosed that his family "may attend Star Awards 2016", and he is jam-packed with filming commitments - he might fly to Taiwan to film a movie in April, before returning to star in Hero the following month, also starring Chen Hanwei and Jesseca Liu. Filming wrapped up in April 2016.

A press conference was held at Swissôtel The Stamford on 21 June 2016. Hugo Ng, Shaun Chen, Rebecca Lim, Ian Fang, Aileen Tan, Pan Lingling, Romeo Tan, Sheila Sim, Hong Ling, Bonnie Loo and Chen Tianwen attended the conference. Notably absent were Jeanette Aw, who was away on a holiday, and Zhang Zhenhuan, who was filming Legal Eagles in Malaysia.

A meet-and-greet session was held on 25 June at Changi City Point. Ng and Pan were not present at the event, but Wong, who was also absent from the conference, joined the other nine. The first 150 audience to form the queue for the event got to receive an autographed poster and a goodie bag each.

== Episodes ==
| No. | Title | Original release date |
|---|---|---|
| 1 | "Episode 1" | June 28, 2016 |
| 2 | "Episode 2" | June 29, 2016 |
| 3 | "Episode 3" | June 30, 2016 |
| 4 | "Episode 4" | July 1, 2016 |
| 5 | "Episode 5" | July 4, 2016 |
| 6 | "Episode 6" | July 5, 2016 |
| 7 | "Episode 7" | July 6, 2016 |
| 8 | "Episode 8" | July 7, 2016 |
| 9 | "Episode 9" | July 8, 2016 |
| 10 | "Episode 10" | July 11, 2016 |
| 11 | "Episode 11" | July 12, 2016 |
| 12 | "Episode 12" | July 13, 2016 |
| 13 | "Episode 13" | July 14, 2016 |
| 14 | "Episode 14" | July 15, 2016 |
| 15 | "Episode 15" | July 18, 2016 |
| 16 | "Episode 16" | July 19, 2016 |
| 17 | "Episode 17" | July 20, 2016 |
| 18 | "Episode 18" | July 21, 2016 |
| 19 | "Episode 19" | July 22, 2016 |
| 20 | "Episode 20" | July 25, 2016 |
| 21 | "Episode 21" | July 26, 2016 |
| 22 | "Episode 22" | July 27, 2016 |
| 23 | "Episode 23" | July 28, 2016 |
| 24 | "Episode 24" | July 29, 2016 |
| 25 | "Episode 25" | August 1, 2016 |
| 26 | "Episode 26" | August 2, 2016 |
| 27 | "Episode 27" | August 3, 2016 |
| 28 | "Episode 28" | August 4, 2016 |
| 29 | "Episode 29" | August 5, 2016 |
| 30 | "Episode 30" | August 8, 2016 |

== Original Sound Track ==
| Song title | Song type | Performer | Lyricist(s) | Composer(s) | Song Arranger(s) | Producer(s) | Provided by |
|---|---|---|---|---|---|---|---|
| 年轮 (Opening Theme Song) | Theme Song | Jim Lim 林倛玉; Chew Sin Huey | Pierre Zhang 乐声 | Matthew Teng 邓碧源 | | Mo Ju Li 麦如丽 | Mediacorp Audio Post |
| 从彼此的世界路过 (Song For Cheng Huishan & Zhang Lixing) | Sub-Theme Song | Pierre Zhang 乐声 | Pierre Zhang 乐声 | Matthew Teng 邓碧源 | | Mo Ju Li 麦如丽 | Mediacorp Audio Post |
| 学会 (Song For Li Junfeng & Jiang Xinya) | Sub-Theme Song | Tay Kewei | Pierre Zhang 乐声 | Matthew Teng 邓碧源 | | Mo Ju Li 麦如丽 | Mediacorp Audio Post |
| 假装不了 | Song | Derrick Hoh | Xiaohan 小寒 | Derrick Hoh 何维健; Tat Tong 唐达 | —N/a | | Warner Music Singapore |
| 相思河畔 | Song | 吴惠冰 | Chris, Babida; Cheng, Kok-Kong | | Matthew Teng 邓碧源 | Mo Ju Li 麦如丽 | Mediacorp Audio Post |

== Accolades ==
| Year | Ceremony | Category | Nominees | Result | Ref |
|---|---|---|---|---|---|
| 2017 | Star Awards | Young Talent Award | Alston Yeo Jun Yi | Nominated | |
| 2017 | Star Awards | Best Director | Doreen Yap Pei Kiang | Nominated | |
| 2017 | Star Awards | London Choco Roll Happiness Award | Ian Fang | Won | |
| 2017 | Star Awards | Bioskin Healthiest Hair Award | Zhang Zhen Huan | Won | |
| 2017 | Star Awards | Bioskin Healthiest Hair Award | Romeo Tan | Nominated | |
| 2017 | Star Awards | Bioskin Healthiest Hair Award | Ian Fang | Nominated | |
| 2017 | Star Awards | Best Theme Song | "年轮" (performed by Jim Lim 林倛玉 and Chew Sin Huey) | Nominated | |
| 2017 | Star Awards | Best Actor | Zhang Zhen Huan | Nominated | |
| 2017 | Star Awards | Best Actress | Jeanette Aw | Nominated | |
| 2017 | Star Awards | Best Supporting Actor | Ian Fang | Nominated | |
| 2017 | Star Awards | Best Supporting Actor | Romeo Tan | Won | |
| 2017 | Star Awards | Best Drama Serial | —N/a | Nominated | |

== See also ==
- List of programmes broadcast by Mediacorp Channel 8
