= Characters of Kinship =

This article contains character information for the Singaporean Chinese family drama series Kinship.

== Main characters ==
=== Chen Anping ===
Cast	Role	Description
Yao Wenlong	Chen Anping	A 55 year old and is married to Meiqi; they have three adopted daughters: Jinsha, Yinsha and Yusheng. Still playful despite his age, Chen Anping is a jovial man who enjoys picking up new things and can often be seen playing with a Game Boy often in the show. He may mingle and joke effortlessly with his customers and foot reflexology disciples but when the time comes to impart his self-discovered theories and skills in foot reflexology, the man is dead serious. To him, foot reflexology is a service to the people and thus he disagrees with Anxin's method of business. It was later revealed that Anping once had a child with Lishi. Lishi wants Anping to be with her but Anping refused, forcing Lishi to cause trouble in his family. Lishi later drop the charges against Jinsha, forcing Anping into a lot of stress. Anping finally decided to go with Lishi as he had no choice. Lishi then tells Meiqi and Da Ying Jia's staff that Anping is leaving Meiqi for her, even saying that he was exchanging himself for Meiqi and the three children's happiness. She later waited at the airport for Anping but he did not show up as Anping has made himself missing. To obtain evidence that can help exonerate Yusheng, Anping eventually give in to Lishi; she drop all charges against Yusheng. Meiqi then pulls out from the love triangle after Lishi buys over half the foot reflexology business. Zhongshang is impressed with Meiqi's kindness and magnanimity and decides to woo her. Even though Anping is with Lishi, he still cannot forget Meiqi; thus, the relationship among the four becomes even more complicated.

=== Lin Meiqi ===
Cast	Role	Description
Xiang Yun	Lin Meiqi	On the surface, it might appear that the superstitious Lin Meiqi leaves all decision-making to her husband Chen Anping, but in actuality, she's a tough cookie whose strong nature and straightforwardness makes her the No.1 in the family. Unhappy with her husband's soft tolerance towards his brother Chen Anxin, Meiqi stamps her feet down and plots to have Anxin kidnapped on the grand opening day of yet another Da Ying Jia branch to show the latter up. Meiqi and Anping are childless, but adopt three girls - Zheng Jinsha, Zheng Yinsha and Zheng Yusheng - from Meiqi's cousin and sister. Meiqi especially hides from Yusheng her true birthright to protect her. As Anping is still "missing", Meiqi has no choice but to hand the foot reflexology business to Naifa but the latter is not only incapable of managing the business, he also gets into more trouble. Meiqi then pulls out from the love triangle after Lishi buys over half the foot reflexology business. Zhongshang is impressed with Meiqi's kindness and magnanimity and decides to woo her. Even though Anping is with Lishi, he still cannot forget Meiqi; thus, the relationship among the four becomes even more complicated.

=== Chen Anxin ===
Cast	Role	Description
Chen Tianwen	Chen Anxin	The ambitious and far-sighted Chen Anxin succeeds in turning Da Ying Jia from a small, HDB flat-operated business into a large-scale enterprise with 14 branches locally with plans to expand overseas and get listed in the stock market. His confidence and success strip years away from his appearance and despite being of the same age as his wife Meixue, the latter look more like his older sister than wife and their relationship is far from passionate. Coupled with his personal assistant Martin's constant introduction of pretty young things to him, Anxin thus has his fair share of extramarital flings. Nevertheless, the flirtatious Anxin finally meets his match in the young and attractive Shuiling. Unaware that the latter is in fact his son Yingjun's girlfriend, Anxin even divorces Meixue to be with her. When the truth surfaces, ties between father and son become strained. Anxin's grudges with the gangster triad not only stirs up enough troubles, it also cause Yingjun to be abducted and his naked photos taken. And when he eventually discovers and unveils Shuiling's true motives, he falls prey to Martin and her murderous plot. Thrown into the sea, he struggles between life and death. Anxin somehow manage to survives the ordeal and returns as a Thai monk named Ha Sa Yan with the fervent hope to lead Shuiling to repentance.

=== Lin Meixue ===
Cast	Role	Description
Lin Meijiao.	Lin Meixue	Unlike her sister Lin Meiqi, Lin Meixue looks tough but is actually a softie at heart. Her husband's success and their financial affluence have turned her into a high society ‘tai-tai'. Years ago, Meixue was dumped by her ex-boyfriend, Li Dawei, and it was only when she married Anxin soon after that she realized she was pregnant with her ex-boyfriend's child. She is unable to conceive again after giving birth to their son Yingjun and because of this deep-seated guilt towards Anxin, she is forgiving towards the latter's dalliances. Meixue becomes depressed when Anxin divorces her for another woman Shuiling, so much until she becomes a bulimic. When Meixue finally sees through Shuiling's web of deceit, she moves back home in a bid to protect Yingjun's inheritance. Shuiling's many plots almost bring to light of Yingjun's parentage. Meixue later was stunned and ended up in hospital after she tried to break up a fight between Chang Ying and Anxin. Which only resulted her hitting herself against the staircase which affected her brain nerves, forcing her into coma. With Shuiling's constant fear that Meixue may wake up one day to expose her evil deeds, and under repeated instigation by Shuiling and Martin end Meixue's life.

=== Chen Yingjun ===
Cast	Role	Description
Elvin Ng	Chen Yingjun	Beneath his cold demeanor, Chen Yingjun is in fact a passionate young man who just isn't very good at socializing and articulating himself. His attractive looks, coupled with his family background, makes him Prince Charming to many young girls. Yingjun has two buddies, Zheng Yusheng and Wind, who are much tougher than he is and often become his ‘bodyguards'. When Yingjun's first love, Zhao Shuiling, dumps him in favour of his rich dad Chen Anxin, Yusheng is there to pick him up and walk him out of his sadness. A romance slowly blooms but both are reluctant to make the first move and confess their feelings. Their relationship meets with more hiccups when Yusheng's colleague Zhang Wenya takes a liking to Yingjun as well. After Yusheng was acquitted of all charges, Yingjun marries her. Yingjun later decides to sue Shuiling and Martin when he learns of the embezzlement scheme and the forgery of the legal documents.

=== Zheng Yusheng ===
Cast	Role	Description
Jesseca Liu	Zheng Yusheng	Zheng Yusheng is lively, optimistic, straightforward and righteous. She remains blissfully unaware of her complicated family background: her birth mother Lin Meiyu and grandmother both took the rap for her drug-dealing father Chang Ying, and Yusheng was born in jail, thus her name is of the same pronunciation as the phrase ‘prison-born'. Her mother was sentenced to death and her grandmother to life imprisonment. Yusheng's aunt Lin Meiqi later adopted her. Yusheng and Chen Yingjun have been a close but bickering duo from young. Yusheng is allergic to chocolate and will always fall into a sleep after eating it, thus the two have more than a few amusing episodes together. When Yingjun has his heart broken after a failed relationship with Zhao Shuiling, Yusheng takes it upon herself to introduce girls to him, yet she finds herself falling for him. Their romance finally takes a step forward after they survive the ordeal of being abducted and nude photos taken of them together. Yusheng also finds out about her parentage after the kidnap and in her quest to uncover the mastermind, becomes a murder suspect. She was given a death sentence, but after Anping decided to give in to Lishi, she was later acquitted of all charges and marries Yingjun.

=== Zheng Jinsha ===
Cast	Role	Description
Cynthia Koh	Zheng Jinsha	Frank and self-righteous, arrogant yet with an inferiority complex, Zheng Jinsha was rescued from a near-destructive delinquent youth by her aunt and uncle, Lin Meiqi and Chen Anping, after her parents died, and Jinsha is thus very filial to the two of them. Both Jinsha's legs are covered with tattoos, thus she'll never be caught in a skirt or short pants. She talks roughly to everyone with the exception of her husband Xu Naifa. With him, she's gentle and soft-spoken and follows his every instruction for fear that he'll leave her. Afraid that her precious children will follow in her wrong footsteps, she's extra strict with them, resulting in strained relations with her son. Jinsha also owns an ice-cream shop next to the foot reflexology centre that's quite widely received by the public. Jinsha's marriage enters into troubled waters when she finds out about Naifa's adulterous affair with Daisy. After she saw Naifa sleeping with Daisy, she became cold to him.

=== Xu Naifa ===
Cast	Role	Description
Darren Lim	Xu Naifa	Glib, sociable and popular with the girls, Xu Naifa regards himself as half the boss of Da Ying Jia based on the fact that he is Chen Anping's son-in-law and that he's been working at the centre since he was 20 years old. He instigates his wife Jinsha to speak well of him to her parents; eventually even opening his own chain of foot reflexology centres, putting his Jinsha in a tight spot. Years ago, Naifa had to marry Jinsha when she became pregnant and ever since then, he would occasionally lament on how he was forced to ‘give up the entire forest for one tree', and how getting married early is one of his life's greatest regrets. Jinsha, naturally, feels uncomfortable hearing those words. Later, Naifa thinks the rich Indonesian lady Daisy will help him further his career and has an affair with her. Both of them were later forced to break-up after Jinsha saw Naifa sleeping with Daisy in their house on their bed, resulting Naifa to lose its business as a boss of his own foot reflexology centre. Naifa later promised to be good to Jinsha and went back to work in Da Ying Jia.

=== Zheng Yinsha ===
Cast	Role	Description
Ann Kok	Zheng Yinsha	Zheng Yinsha is overconfident, pushy and ambitious. Afraid of doing household chores, she is lucky to marry Hong Zhaoyang, a man who willingly gave up his career as a swimming instructor to be a househusband. The couple is shaken from their comfortable lifestyle when Zhaoyang's mother comes to live with them. Extremely displeased that her son has become a ‘slave' to his wife, the elderly lady quarrels with Yinsha often, leaving Zhaoyang caught in the middle. Yinsha however faces tremendous difficulty in her career when she is charged with selling fake medicine, and this drives her to depression. As Yinsha is about to go overseas, she finally appreciates Zhao Yang.

=== Hong Zhaoyang ===
This Mr Goody-Two-Shoes has no temper at all and is a big softie at heart; Hong Zhaoyang only weakness is that his overly passionate and helpful nature can sometimes turn things for the worse.

Zhaoyang, once a superb swimming instructor, met his student Zheng Yinsha at the pool and love blossomed from there. He enjoys doing housework and cooking, and loves his wife and children extremely.

With a special passion for baking, Zhaoyang decides to rent a stall in the market to hawk his creations but is eventually conned of his money. He then takes over half of the stall space in his sister-in-law Zheng Jinsha's ice-cream parlour to sell his cakes. There, he becomes acquainted with Heping, a study mother, and incurs the suspect of his wife Yinsha for having an affair.

Hong Zhaoyang is played by Alan Tern.

=== Zhao Shuiling ===
Despite her sweet looks, Zhao Shuiling, or sometimes referred to as Lynn, is actually a superficial and jealous young woman who will stoop to any level to get what she wants.

She comes from a humble family background. Her father is a lorry driver and her mum, unable to take living a poor lifestyle, ran away deserting husband and daughter; from a young age, Shuiling thus vows to leave poverty behind when she grows up.

Shuiling works as a bar hostess to fulfill her dream of studying overseas. Once abroad, it becomes her goal to snare a rich man to marry, and the handsome Chen Yingjun, son to businessman Chen Anxin, becomes her willing target. Hiccups mar her otherwise perfect plan: their marriage is opposed strongly to by Yingjun's parents and Yingjun even leaves home in search of independence after a fall-out with his father.

Shuiling's feelings for Yingjun begin to waver. Eventually, the materialistic girl decides to marry the wealthy Chen Anxin instead. To cement her position in the Chen household, she repeatedly creates misunderstandings between Anxin and Yingjun. On the other hand, Shuiling is jealous of Yingjun's relationship with his new girlfriend and again wreaks havoc. To top off her devious plots, Shuiling links arms with Anxin's assistant Martin to frame Anxin.

Anxin and Chang Yi cooperates to reveal Shuiling's true colours, and when Martin finds out, he and Shuiling stuns both of them and throws them into the sea, leaving them to drown.

Shuiling then forges the legal assets authorization documents to seize control of Da Ying Jia. With the constant fear that Meixue may wake up one day to expose her evil deeds, and under repeated instigation by Martin, Shuiling and Martin end Meixue's life.

Anxin somehow survives the ordeal and returns as a Thai monk with the fervent hope to lead Shuiling to repentance. Shuiling however decides that there is no turning back and plans to embezzle large funds from Da Ying Jia with Martin. Yingjun decides to sue them when he learns of the embezzlement scheme and the forgery of the legal documents.

Shuiling later becomes mentally unstable and was sent to a mental hospital.

Zhao Shuiling is played by Eelyn Kok.

=== Zhang Wenya ===
Innocent and soft Zhang Wenya is totally opposite to tough cookie Zheng Yusheng but both are extremely close. After a chance meeting with Chen Yingjun, Wenya falls in love with him at first sight and with Yusheng's help, manages to get closer to Yingjun after his break-up with Zhao Shuiling. Wenya and Yingjun soon develop feelings for each other.

Wenya grew up with only her mother for support and both share a deep relationship. Her mum wants her to marry into a rich family and tries hard to fan the flames between Wenya and Yingjun. When she discovers the growing affections between Yingjun and Yusheng, the elderly lady listens to Shuiling's ‘advice' and pretends to suffer from aphasia in a bid to make Yingjun stay.

Wenya's life is in danger when she accidentally learns what both Shuiling and Martin have done.

Zhang Wenya is played by Carrie Yeo.

=== Wind ===
The lively and extroverted Wind is best pals with Chen Yingjun and will always stand up for him. Seeing red over Zhao Shuiling's cold-hearted ways, there are times when Wind is tempted to tell Chen Anxin about Shuiling's relationship with his son Yingjun but is stopped by the latter.

From young, Wind's ambition is to be a hair stylist but he ends up as a helper in a barber shop instead. Later, Lin Meiqi brings him home to stay and he develops affections for Zheng Yusheng.

Chen Anping sees the potential in Wind and offers him a job in the foot reflexology centre. Wind accepts the job to be closer to Yusheng but he gradually realizes his talent in foot reflexology and becomes Anping's protégé, thus becoming one of the ‘Four Heavenly Kings'. He remains devoted to Yusheng till he discovers the romance between her and Yingjun; then a complicated quadrangular relationship between Wind, Yingjun, Yusheng and Wenya results.

Wind later decide to pull out from the love triangle and flew back to his hometown in China.

Wind is played by Li Jianxun.

=== Martin ===
Martin or Mading, knows everything there is to know about Chen Anxin, and his job scope includes settling any trouble after his boss's many flings.

When he realises that Anxin has fallen in love with Zhao Shuiling, he hides the truth of Shuiling being Chen Yingjun's girlfriend from him and even hooks Anxin up with Shuiling.

Martin is especially impressed with Shuiling's intelligence and deviousness, and goes all out to please her. With Shuiling's constant fear that Meixue may wake up one day to expose her evil deeds, and under repeated instigation by Martin, Shuiling and Martin end Meixue's life. Martin plans to flee even as Shuiling goes berserk.

Martin is played by Brandon Wong.

=== Chang Ying ===
Chang Ying opened a massage parlour near Anping's parlour just to rival him and gain customers. After his parlour was set on fire by an arsonist, he immediately suspects Yusheng who left in a huff after their first meeting. After learning that Yusheng is his daughter, he repents and turns over a new leaf. Anxin and Chang Yi cooperates to reveal Shuiling's true colours, and when Martin finds out, Martin and Shuiling stuns both of them and throws them into the sea, leaving them to drown.

Chang Ying is lucky to survive the murder attempt but he assumes a new identity as Zhen Zixin, a private investigator. Through various investigation tactics, he attempts to bring to Yusheng's knowledge Shuiling and Martin's despicable schemes, and at the same time, re-build their bond as father and daughter.

Chang Ying is played by Zhang Wen Xiang.

=== Ying Lishi ===
Cast	Role	Description
Hong Huifang	Yang Lishi	The former classmate of Anping at the Ying Massage School, Ying Lishi came back to Singapore to seek revenge on Anping. She claims Anping once had a child with her and wants compensation for his running away after abandoning her and the child. She somehow knows about Anping family background and she causes trouble for his family, framing his three daughters: Jinsha for child abusing her son, Yinsha for selling fake health products, and Yusheng for murder. She agrees to end the mayhem if Anping goes with her. Anping however refused and Lishi drop the charges against Jinsha, forcing Anping into a lot of stress. Anping finally decided to go with Lishi as he had no choice and Lishi tells Meiqi and Da Ying Jia's staff that Anping is leaving Meiqi for her, even saying that he was exchanging himself for Meiqi and the three children's happiness. She later waited at the airport for Anping but he did not show up as Anping has made himself missing. To obtain evidence that can help exonerate Yusheng, Anping eventually give in to Lishi; she drop all charges against Yusheng. Lishi later buys over half the foot reflexology business as a direct challenge to Meiqi. She ultimately dies due to a heart problem.

=== Li Zhongshang ===
Cast	Role	Description
Wang Yuqing	Li Zhongshang	Li Zhongshang is a rich middle-aged businessman and decides to woo Meiqi because he is impressed with her kindness and magnanimity. Even though Anping is with Lishi, he still cannot forget Meiqi; thus, the relationship among the four becomes even more complicated.

== Supporting characters ==
=== Qian Duoduo ===
Cast	Role	Description
Bryan Wong	Qian Duoduo	The joker in the healthcare centre, is madly infatuated with Zheng Yusheng and will do absolutely anything for her.

=== Heping ===
Cast	Role	Description
May Phua	Zhaoyang	When Zhaoyang takes over half of the stall space in his sister-in-law Zheng Jinsha's ice-cream parlour to sell his cakes, he becomes acquainted with Heping, a study mother, and incurs the suspect of his wife Yinsha for having an affair.

=== Youmei ===
Cast	Role	Description
Cassandra See	Youmei	An assistance to Chang Ying when he opens a massage palour near Anping's parlour just to rival him and gain customers.

=== Li Dawei ===
Cast	Role	Description
Wang Yuqing	Li Dawei	Dumped Meixue years ago and did not realized she was pregnant with his child, Yingjun.
