= Kinship (TV series) =

- 手足
- Genre: Long Running Drama
- Created by: Ng Kah Huay
- Written by: Kwok Kar Peng; Dion Tang; He Xing Ying; Gladys Tan
- Directed by: Benny Wong
- Creative director: Liu Jinan
- Starring: Elvin Ng; Jesseca Liu; Ann Kok; Xiang Yun; Yao Wenlong; Chen Tianwen; Cynthia Koh; Sylvester Tan
- Theme music composer: Benny Wong
- Opening theme: 逃离 by A-do
- Ending theme: 换季 by Jin Sha
- Composer: Benny Wong
- Country of origin: Singapore
- Original languages: English; Mandarin
- No. of seasons: 2
- No. of episodes: 83 (list of episodes)

Production
- Executive producer: Kelly Cheng
- Producer: Kelly Cheng
- Production locations: Downtown, Singapore
- Cinematography: Liu Tianfu
- Camera setup: Chun Tianfu
- Running time: 45 minutes
- Production company: MediaCorp TV

Original release
- Network: MediaCorp TV Channel 8
- Release: Invalid date range

Kinship (Simplified Chinese: 手足) is a Singaporean Chinese long running drama which was televised on Singapore's free-to-air channel, MediaCorp TV Channel 8. The drama was divided into two parts, which were broadcast every weekday evening from June 2007 to August 2007 for first part and December 2007 to February 2008 for the second part.

The drama series starred Elvin Ng, Jesseca Liu, Ann Kok, Xiang Yun, Yao Wenlong, Chen Tianwen, Cynthia Koh & Sylvester Tan. As such, producers have cited this drama as a highly anticipated drama, comparable to the likes of Holland V, Double Happiness and Portrait of Home. This drama is one of the longest running dramas with 83 episodes, being produced by MediaCorp in 2007. Despite being a highly anticipated drama, it received more criticism than any other locally produced Chinese-language drama and only half of the expected viewership.

Part 1 premiered on 19 June 2007 and ended on 17 August 2007. Part 2 premiered on 17 December 2007 and ended on 8 February 2008.

== Plot ==
=== Part 1 ===
Da Ying Jia foot reflexology centre was founded by the brothers, Anping and Anxin, 25 years ago. Now, both of them split-up and Anxin takes charge of the business operations of the new branches of Da Ying Jia while Anping stays in the original centre, becoming a foot reflexologist.

Anping married Meiqi and both of them adopted three girls: Jinsha, Yinsha and Yusheng. Two of them, Jinsha and Yinsha, are married to their husbands, Naifa and Zhaoyang respectively, and they live near to Anping's residence, a HDB flat's unit in Singapore.

Both Jinsha and Naifa have two children, a son and a daughter. However, due to poor parenting skills, the two children turn out extremely problematic. This also causes the relationship between Jinsha and her son to worsen.

Yinsha and Zhaoyang has a daughter. Even since Zhaoyang marries Yinsha, he quits his job and becomes a "maid". Zhaoyang then opens a small kueh stall and hires a woman named Heping to assist his stall.

The cheerful and tomboyish Yusheng is a prison warden. She had a birth father named Chang Ying. His wife and his mother were charged with a drug-related crime that Chang Ying committed and they were punished for something they did not do. Chang Ying's wife was sentenced to death as a result and his mother was sentenced to life imprisonment. When held in death row, she gave birth to Yusheng and was adopted by her aunt, Meiqi, when she was three.

Anxin is married to Meiqi's younger sister, Meixue. She gave birth to a son, Yingjun and could not give birth to anymore children. However, Meixue has a deep and dark secret: Yingjun is actually her ex-boyfriend, David Li's son.

Anxin hopes that Yingjun will take over the business in future, and thus, after his graduation, he forces his son to join the company. Yingjun then meets two young women: Shuiling and Wenya. Shuiling is his first girlfriend, but through Martin's arrangement, Shuiling also gets to know Anxin at the same time. When Anxin divorces Meixue in favour of Shuiling, Yingjun's girlfriend (though he does not know it), Meixue requests 30% of Da Ying Jia's shares to be transferred to Yingjun.

Duoduo, a member of Da Ying Jia, is secretly in love with Yusheng. Wind, an inspiring hair stylist who later join Da Ying Jia, is also secretly in love with Yusheng. He is Anping's last disciple and his massage skills are spectacular, gaining him much popularity among the auntie-clientele of the centre. Anping wishes for Wind to be his successor and take over Da Ying Jia, giving Naifa much grief.

Chang Ying opens a massage parlour in the vicinity of Da Ying Jia, but was closed down after caught fire. Thinking it was Yusheng who did it, he kidnaps Yusheng and later Yingjun, who tried to save Yusheng, and took nude photos of them as threats. Yusheng is also sent to the hospital with serious injuries. Meiqi, aghast at Chang Ying's despicable ways, reveals to Chang Ying that Yusheng is in fact his daughter.

Together with Anxin, both of them cooperates to reveal Shuiling's true colours, and when Martin finds out, he and Shuiling stuns both of them and throws them into the sea, leaving them to drown.

Lishi then appears, claiming that Anping once had a child with her. Somehow, she knows about his family background and she causes trouble for his family, framing his three daughters: Jinsha for child abusing her son, Yinsha for selling fake health products, and Yusheng for murder. She agrees to end the mayhem if Anping goes with her. Anping however refused and Lishi drop the charges against Jinsha, forcing Anping into a lot of stress.

Anping finally decided to go with Lishi as he had no choice and Lishi tells Meiqi and Da Ying Jia's staff that Anping is leaving Meiqi for her, even saying that he was exchanging himself for Meiqi and the three children's happiness. She later waited at the airport for Anping but he did not show up. Anping had gone missing and the story continues in Part 2...

=== Part 2 ===
Yusheng is given the death sentence and Meiqi desperately seeks ways and means to exonerate her. As Anping's whereabouts is still unknown, Meiqi has no choice but to hand the foot reflexology business to Naifa but the latter is not only incapable of managing the business, he also gets into more trouble.

To obtain evidence that can help exonerate Yusheng, Anping has no choice but to give in to Lishi. Yusheng is eventually acquitted and marries Yingjun. Lishi buys over half the foot reflexology business as a direct challenge to Meiqi. Devastated and heartbroken, Meiqi decides to pull out from the love triangle.

A rich middle-aged businessman Zhongshang is impressed with Meiqi's kindness and magnanimity and decides to woo her. Even though Anping is with Lishi, he still cannot forget Meiqi; thus, the relationship among the four becomes even more complicated.

Yinsha faces tremendous difficulty in her career when she is charged with selling fake medicine, and this drives her to depression. Jinsha's marriage also enters into troubled waters when she finds out about Naifa's adulterous affair with Daisy.

Chang Ying is lucky to survive the murder attempt but he assumes a new identity as Zixin, a private investigator. Through various investigation tactics, he attempts to bring to Yusheng's knowledge Shuiling and Martin's despicable schemes, and at the same time, re-build their bond as father and daughter.

To seize control of Da Ying Jia, Shuiling forges the legal assets authorization documents. Although everyone is suspicious, there is nothing they can do about it. With the constant fear that Meixue may wake up one day to expose her evil deeds, and under repeated instigation by Martin, Shuiling and Martin end Meixue's life.

Anxin also survives the ordeal and returns as a Thai monk with the fervent hope to lead Shuiling to repentance. Shuiling however decides that there is no turning back and plans to embezzle large funds from Da Ying Jia with Martin. Yingjun decides to sue them when he learns of the embezzlement scheme and the forgery of the legal documents.

Martin plans to flee even as Shuiling goes berserk. Wenya's life is in danger when she accidentally learns what they have done...

== Viewership ==
Despite this drama series being a highly anticipated drama, the viewership of Part 1 of this drama was not good at all. This made it a huge disappointment for MediaCorp. Most audience thought the drama would have at least 800,000 people watching in the first week, but the actual viewership showed that it was only half the expectations, though the drama's ratings were always constantly higher than Channel U's Korean drama Be Strong Geum Soon that was aired at the same slot for the nine weeks that it aired (which incidentally ended its run on the same day as Kinship Part 1). Following the disappointing viewership and reviews of Part 1, Part 2 carried on to be a let down, recording one of the lowest viewership ratings for the year 2007.

Week	Air date	Rating
Part 1
Average Number of audience (Rounded off to the nearest thousand)
Week 1	19 June 2007 to 22 June 2007	444, 000
Week 2	25 June 2007 to 29 June 2007	440, 000
Week 3	2 July 2007 to 6 July 2007	436, 000
Week 4	9 July 2007 to 13 July 2007	465, 000
Week 5	16 July 2007 to 20 July 2007	478, 000
Week 6	23 July 2007 to 27 July 2007	494, 000
Week 7	30 July 2007 to 3 August 2007	516, 000
Week 8	6 August 2007 to 10 August 2007 (Exclude 9 August 2007 coverage live network on National Day Parade, 2007)	497, 000
Week 9	13 August 2007 to 17 August 2007 (include Last Episode)	513, 000
Part 2
Percentage of Population (%) (Rounded off to nearest decimal place)
Week 1	17 December 2007 to 21 December 2007	TBA
Week 2	24 December 2007 to 28 December 2007 (Exclude 24 December 2007 coverage live network on Christmas Eve and 25 December 2007 coverage live network on Christmas Day)	approx. 12
Week 3	31 December 2007 to 4 January 2008 (Exclude coverage live network on New Year's Eve and New Year's Day)	13.5
Week 4	7 January 2008 to 11 January 2008	13.2
Week 5	14 January 2008 to 18 January 2008	14.0
Week 6	21 January 2008 to 25 January 2008	13.2
Week 7	28 January 2008 to 1 February 2008	14.0
Week 8	4 February 2008 to 8 February 2008 (Exclude Chinese New Year's Eve and Chinese New Year's Day)	13.0

== Production ==
This drama is the longest running drama (with 83 episodes) being produced by MediaCorp in Year 2007. The drama was originally intended to have 80 episodes altogether, but extended its run by three episodes due to the fact that Part 1 will be pre-empted due to National Day Parade.

== Accolades ==
Organisation	Year	Award	Recipient(s)	Result	Ref.
Star Awards	2007	Best Drama Set Design 最佳戏剧布景设计	Oh Hock Leong 胡福隆 and Ho Hock Choon 何福春	Won	
Star Awards	2007	Best Actress	Jesseca Liu	Nominated	
Star Awards	2007	Best Supporting Actor	Darren Lim	Won	
Star Awards	2007	Best Supporting Actress	Eelyn Kok	Nominated	
Star Awards	2007	Best Theme Song	"逃离" (sung by A-do)	Nominated	
