= Kinship Part 1 (TV series) =

- 手足 1
- Genre: Long Running Drama
- Created by: Ng Kah Huay 黄佳华
- Written by: Kwok Kar Peng; Dion Tang; He Xing Ying; Gladys Tan
- Directed by: Benny Wong
- Creative director: Liu Jinan
- Starring: Elvin Ng; Jesseca Liu; Yao Wenlong; Xiang Yun; Darren Lim; Cynthia Koh; Ann Kok; Alan Tern; Chen Tianwen; Lin Meijiao
- Theme music composer: Benny Wong
- Opening theme: 逃离 by A-do featuring
- Ending theme: 换季
- Composer: Benny Wong
- Country of origin: Singapore
- Original languages: English; Mandarin
- No. of episodes: 43 (list of episodes)

Production
- Executive producer: Kelly Cheng
- Producer: Kelly Cheng
- Production locations: Downtown, Singapore
- Cinematography: Liu Tianfu
- Camera setup: Chun Tianfu
- Running time: 45 minutes
- Production company: MediaCorp TV

Original release
- Network: MediaCorp TV Channel 8
- Release: 19 June – 17 August 2007

Related
- Kinship Part 2

Kinship Season 1 (Simplified Chinese: 手足第一部, 手足) is a Singaporean Chinese long-running drama that was televised on Singapore's free-to-air channel, MediaCorp TV Channel 8 every Monday to Friday at 19:00 tonight. The drama was the first of two parts, making its debut on 19 June 2007.

This drama series consists of a cast which aims to appeal to both younger and older audience. As such, the producers have cited this drama as a highly anticipated drama, comparable to the likes of Holland V, Double Happiness and Portrait of Home. This drama is one of the longest running dramas (with 43 episodes) being produced by MediaCorp in 2007.

== Synopsis ==
From its humble beginnings of operating from an HDB flat as a small family business 25 years ago, foot reflexology centre Da Ying Jia, jointly started by brothers Chen Anping (Yao Wenlong) and Chen Anxin (Chen Tianwen), has now expanded into a large-scale business with many branches. It has developed even further into dealing in health equipment supplies.

Elder brother Anping makes the decision to stay in the original centre as a foot reflexologist while the ambitious Anxin expands the business and takes over the business operations of the branches.

Anxin is an impressive businessman and once the business took off, he moves into a big house, buys a luxurious car and lives an extravagant lifestyle. Anping on the other hand, continues to work at the foot reflexology centre like he has for the past 20 years, keeping his head bowed as he diligently massages the feet of his clients. Anping's wife Lin Meiqi and 'daughters' are indignant about this.

Meiqi (Xiang Yun) is a tough lady who has no children of her own but adopted three girls Zheng Jinsha (Cynthia Koh), Zheng Yinsha (Ann Kok) and Zheng Yusheng (Jesseca Liu). All three 'daughters' regard Meiqi and Anping as their real parents. Even though Jinsha and Yinsha are married, they live near to Anping's residence so that they can take care of one another.

Jinsha's husband Xu Naifa (Darren Lim) is a masseur at Da Ying Jia and has been working there since he was 20 years old. Regarding himself an old hand at the job, and adding to the fact that he is Anping's son-in-law, he thus has a sense of self-importance and goes about with the air of a partial boss. He loves to voice his opinions loudly and confidently, especially on important world affairs, and considers himself a man of substance and intelligence who is merely stuck in a dead-end career due to circumstances. Thus, he instigates his wife to speak well of him to her parents all the time. Naifa and Jinsha have a son and a daughter but due to poor parenting, the two children turn out extremely problematic.

Yinsha has an overtly strong character and work as the president of a direct sales company dealing in health products. Her husband Hong Zhaoyang (Alan Tern) used to be a swimming coach but as a result of Yinsha's obsession with her career and neglect of home matters, Zhaoyang naturally takes over all the chores in the family, including looking after their daughter who is enrolled in primary school.

The cheerful Yusheng is a prison warden and has a family background that not many know of. Her father was a drug dealer, and when he was caught, her mother and grandmother took the blame for the crime as his scapegoats. Her mother was sentenced to death, while her grandmother was sentenced to life imprisonment. Yusheng was born in the prison, thus her name, is of the same pronunciation as the phrase 'prison-born'. When she was three years old, her aunt Meiqi adopted her.

Anxin's wife Lin Meixue (Lin Meijiao) is Meiqi's younger sister. In her younger days, when her then-boyfriend abandoned her, Meiqi played matchmaker to Meixue and Anxin, and that was how they got married. After the birth of their son Chen Yingjun (Elvin Ng), they are unable to have any more children. Anxin, who loves kids, is deeply disappointed by this fact. Meixue feels extremely guilty as well, though for another reason. She guards a deep, dark secret for more than 20 years: Yingjun is not Anxin's flesh and blood, but her ex-boyfriend's. She has never dared to tell anyone about this, not even her sister Meiqi. Due to this guilt, Meixue never questions Anxin's womanising ways, which is a habit bred from his right-hand man Martin (Brandon Wong) who fearlessly keeps introducing beautiful women to get into Anxin's good books.

Anxin hopes that his son Yingjun will take over the business in future. Therefore, Yingjun joins the company immediately after his graduation to start learning the ropes. He meets two young ladies, Zhao Shuiling (Eelyn Kok) and Zhang Wenya (Carrie Yeo) one after the other. He dates Shuiling but through Martin's arrangement, Shuiling also gets to know Anxin at the same time. Anxin falls in love with Shuiling, and not knowing that Shuiling is his son's girlfriend, he decides to divorce Meixue and marry her. The enmity between father and son thus begins to build...

Anping, Naifa, Duoduo (Bryan Wang) and Wind (Li Jianxun) are the 'Four Heavenly Kings' at the foot reflexology centre. The other staff members include Simon, who thinks rather highly of himself just because he's older in age, and Xiao Kai who is blessed with a glib tongue. Duoduo, who is secretly in love with Yusheng, isn't much to look at but has a kind and good heart. Wind is Anping's last disciple and also Yingjun's ex-classmate. His massage skills are spectacular, gaining him much popularity among the auntie-clientele of the centre. Anping wishes for Wind to be his successor and take over Da Ying Jia, giving Naifa much grief. Wind is attracted to the carefree and straightforward Yusheng, who always ridicules herself for being totally unladylike.

Chang Ying (Zhang Xinxiang) opens a massage parlour in the vicinity of Da Ying Jia, and the area becomes flooded with female masseurs pulling in customers. An infuriated Yusheng storms up to Chang Ying but their 'discussion' fell through. When his massage parlour inexplicably burst into flames, Chang Ying is adamant that Yusheng started the fire and abducts her. Yingjun witnesses the kidnap and in his gallant attempt to rescue her, ends up being taken as well. Chang Ying then takes nude photos of them as threats, and Yusheng is also sent to the hospital with serious injuries. Meiqi, aghast at Chang Ying's despicable ways, reveals to Chang Ying that Yusheng is in fact his own flesh and blood...

He cooperates with Anxin to reveal Shuiling's true colours, and when Martin finds out, he and Shuiling throws Anxin and Chang Ying into the sea, leaving them to drown...

A sinister character called Lishi appears, claiming that Anping once had a child with her. She causes trouble for his family, framing his three daughters: Jinsha for child abuse, Yinsha for fraud, and Yusheng for murder. She agrees to end the mayhem if Anping goes with her. Anping agrees, resigned to his fate.

With complex family relations, contrasting backgrounds of each staff member and customers from different lifestyles and social levels, Da Ying Jia maintains seemingly calm operations, while in fact, beneath the surface lies exciting undercurrents of rapid twists and turns as the story unfolds...

== Viewership ==
Despite this drama series being a highly anticipated drama (with 83 episodes, 43 of them belong to Part 1), the viewership of the drama was not good at all. This made it a huge disappointment for MediaCorp. Most audience thought the drama would have at least 800,000 people watching in the first week, but the actual viewership showed that it was only half the expectations, though the drama's ratings were always constantly higher than Channel U's Korean drama Be Strong Geum Soon that was aired at the same slot for the nine weeks that it aired (which incidentally ended its run on the same day as Kinship Part 1).

Week	Air date	Average Number of audience (Rounded to nearest thousand)
Week 1	19 June 2007 to 22 June 2007	444, 000
Week 2	25 June 2007 to 29 June 2007	440, 000
Week 3	2 July 2007 to 6 July 2007	436, 000
Week 4	9 July 2007 to 13 July 2007	465, 000
Week 5	16 July 2007 to 20 July 2007	478, 000
Week 6	23 July 2007 to 27 July 2007	494, 000
Week 7	30 July 2007 to 3 August 2007	516, 000
Week 8	6 August 2007 to 10 August 2007 (Exclude 9 August 2007 coverage live network on National Day Parade, 2007)	497, 000
Week 9	13 August 2007 to 17 August 2007 (include Last Episode)	513, 000

== Production ==
This drama is the longest running drama (with 83 episodes) being produced by MediaCorp in 2007. The drama was originally intended to have 80 episodes but extended its run partly because the drama was being pre-empted on National Day.

== Accolades ==
Organisation	Year	Award	Recipient(s)	Result	Ref.
Star Awards	2007	Best Drama Set Design 最佳戏剧布景设计	Oh Hock Leong 胡福隆 and Ho Hock Choon 何福春	Won	
Star Awards	2007	Best Actress	Jesseca Liu	Nominated	
Star Awards	2007	Best Supporting Actor	Darren Lim	Won	
Star Awards	2007	Best Supporting Actress	Eelyn Kok	Nominated	
Star Awards	2007	Best Theme Song	"逃离" (sung by A-do)	Nominated	
