= Chen Yingxiong =

Chen Yingxiong (陳英雄) may refer to:

- Chen Yingxiong, a character in Singaporean television series Kinship series
- Trần Anh Hùng (born 1962), Vietnamese director and screenwriter
