= Kinship Part 2 (TV series) =

- 手足第二部, 手足續集
- Genre: Long Running Drama
- Created by: Ng Kah Huay 黄佳华
- Written by: Kwok Kar Peng; Dion Tang; He Xing Ying; Gladys Tan
- Directed by: Benny Wong
- Creative director: Liu Jinan
- Presented by: Elvin Ng; Jesseca Liu; Yao Wenlong; Xiang Yun; Darren Lim; Cynthia Koh; Ann Kok; Alan Tern; Chen Tianwen; Lin Meijiao
- Starring: Elvin Ng; Jesseca Liu; Ann Kok; Xiang Yun; Yao Wenlong; Chen Tianwen; Cynthia Koh
- Theme music composer: Benny Wong
- Opening theme: 逃离 by Elvin Ng featuring Jesseca Liu
- Ending theme: 换季 by Elvin Ng featuring Jesseca Liu
- Composer: Benny Wong
- Country of origin: Singapore
- Original language: Mandarin
- No. of episodes: 40 (list of episodes)

Production
- Executive producer: Kelly Cheng
- Producer: Kelly Cheng
- Production locations: Downtown, Singapore
- Cinematography: Liu Tianfu
- Camera setup: Chun Tianfu
- Running time: approx. 45 minutes
- Production company: MediaCorp TV

Original release
- Network: MediaCorp TV Channel 8
- Release: 17 December 2007 – 8 February 2008

Related
- Kinship Part 1

Kinship Part 2 (Simplified Chinese: 手足第二部, 手足續集) is a Singaporean Chinese long running drama which was televised on Singapore's free-to-air channel, MediaCorp TV Channel 8 every Monday to Friday at 19:00. It made its debut on 17 December 2007. The drama is the second of two parts.

This drama series consists of a cast which aims to appeal to both younger and older audience. As such, the producers have cited this drama as a highly anticipated drama, comparable to the likes of Holland V, Double Happiness and Portrait of Home. This drama is the longest running drama (with 40 episodes) being produced by MediaCorp in 2007.

== Plot ==
Yusheng is given the death sentence and Meiqi desperately seeks ways and means to exonerate her. As Anping's whereabouts is still unknown, Meiqi has no choice but to hand the foot reflexology business to Naifa but the latter is not only incapable of managing the business, he also gets into more trouble.

To obtain evidence that can help exonerate Yusheng, Anping has no choice but to give in to Lishi. Yusheng is eventually acquitted and marries Yingjun. Lishi buys over half the foot reflexology business as a direct challenge to Meiqi. Devastated and heartbroken, Meiqi decides to pull out from the love triangle.

A rich middle-aged businessman Li Zhongshang is impressed with Meiqi's kindness and magnanimity and decides to woo her. Even though Anping is with Lishi, he still cannot forget Meiqi; thus, the relationship among the four becomes even more complicated.

Yinsha faces tremendous difficulty in her career when she is charged with selling fake medicine, and this drives her to depression. Jinsha's marriage also enters into troubled waters when she finds out about Naifa's adulterous affair with Daisy.

Chang Yin is lucky to survive the murder attempt but he assumes a new identity as Zixin, a private investigator. Through various investigation tactics, he attempts to bring to Yusheng's knowledge Shuiling and Martin's despicable schemes, and at the same time, re-build their bond as father and daughter.

To seize control of Da Ying Jia, Shuiling forges the legal assets authorization documents. Although everyone is suspicious, there is nothing they can do about it. With the constant fear that Meixue may wake up one day to expose her evil deeds, and under repeated instigation by Martin, Shuiling and Martin end Meixue's life.

Anxin also survives the ordeal and returns as a Thai monk with the fervent hope to lead Shuiling to repentance. Shuiling however decides that there is no turning back and plans to embezzle large funds from Da Ying Jia with Martin. Yingjun decides to sue them when he discovers the embezzlement scheme and the forgery of the legal documents.

Martin plans to flee even as Shuiling goes berserk. Wenya's life is in danger when she accidentally learns what they have done...

== Viewership ==
Week	Date	Percentage of Population (%) (Rounded off to nearest decimal place)	Notes
Week 1	17 December 2007 to 21 December 2007	TBA	
Week 2	24 December 2007 to 28 December 2007	approx. 12%	Exclude 24 December 2007 coverage live network on Christmas Eve and 25 December 2007 coverage live network on Christmas Day.
Week 3	31 December 2007 to 4 January 2008	13.5%	Exclude 31 December 2007 coverage live network on New Year's Eve goodbye to 2007 and 1 January 2008 coverage live network on New Year's Day welcome to 2008.
Week 4	7 January 2008 to 11 January 2008	13.2%	
Week 5	14 January 2008 to 18 January 2008	14.0%	
Week 6	21 January 2008 to 25 January 2008	13.2%	
Week 7	28 January 2008 to 1 February 2008	14.0%	
Week 8	4 February 2008 to 8 February 2008	13.0%	Exclude 6 February 2008 coverage live network on Chinese New Year's Eve and 7 February 2008 coverage live network on Chinese New Year's Day durated for 2 days.
