= Chen Yingjun =

Chen Yingjun (陳英俊) may refer to:

- Chen Yingjun, a character in Singaporean television series Kinship series
- Nguyễn Trần Anh Tuấn (阮陳英俊, Ruǎn Chén Yīngjùn, born 1998), Vietnamese weightlifter
