= Star Awards 2005 =

Singaporean television awards

Star Awards 2005 红星大奖2005
- Date: 4 December 2005
- Location: MediaCorp TV Theatre
- Country: Singapore
- Hosted by: Guo Liang; Patty Hou

Highlights
- Most awards: A New Life (3)
- Most nominations: A New Life; Portrait of Home (6 each)
- Best Drama: A New Life
- Best Variety/Info-ed Show: Say It If You Dare
- Best Variety Special: Ren Ci Charity Show 2005
- All-time Favourite Artiste: Fann Wong; Xie Shaoguang

Television/radio coverage
- Network: MediaCorp Channel 8 MediaCorp Channel U (Post-show)
- Runtime: 180 mins (both presentations); 60 mins (Post-show); 15 mins (Prelude)

Star Awards 2005 was the 12th Star Awards ceremony, held on 4 December 2005. It was part of the annual Star Awards organised by MediaCorp for MediaCorp TV Channel 8. Following MediaCorp's merger with SPH MediaWorks on 1 January 2005, the nominees included artistes from the former SPH MediaWorks Channel U, many of whom were former employees of MediaCorp and its predecessor Television Corporation of Singapore. MediaCorp TV Channel 8 broadcast the awards ceremony from 7:00 pm to 10:00 pm while SPH MediaWorks Channel U (now MediaCorp TV Channel U), aired the ceremony for the first time and began broadcasting the ceremony at 7:30 pm.

Prior to the actual ceremony, a separate awards ceremony and gala was held at The Fullerton Hotel in which technical category awards (e.g. Best Director, Best Screenplay, etc.) and the Young Talent Award (child actors) were given out.

The show lasted three hours and saw four artistes winning two awards each, namely Bryan Wong (Best Comedy Performer, Top 10 Most Popular Male Artistes), Chen Hanwei (Best Actor, Top 10 Most Popular Male Artistes), Huang Biren (Best Actress, Top 10 Most Popular Female Artistes) and Quan Yi Fong (Best Variety Show Host, Top 10 Most Popular Female Artistes).

== Winners and nominees ==
Unless otherwise stated, the winners are listed first, highlighted in boldface, or highlighted.

=== Backstage achievement awards ceremony ===
As like preceding ceremonies, professional and technical awards were presented before the main ceremony via a clip montage due to time constraints. Unless otherwise stated, the lists of winners are only reflected in the table.

**Young Talent Award 青苹果奖**: **Leslie Leung 梁世杰 – Double Happiness II 喜临门II**; Fraser Tiong 张家奇 – Zero to Hero 阴差阳错; Joavan Brandan Bosco Pereira 卓万 – Portrait of Home 同心圆; Rachell Ng 黄莛贻 – Baby Blues 谁家母鸡不生蛋; Li Yuan Xiao 肖力源 – Zero to Hero 阴差阳错	**Best Theme Song 最佳主题曲**: **Ocean Ou 欧得洋 – A New Life – 《明天的幸福》**; Fish Leong 梁静茹 – Baby Blues 谁家母鸡不生蛋 – 《路》; Fann Wong 范文芳 – Beautiful Illusions 镜中人 – 《镜中人》; Joi Chua 蔡淳佳 – Destiny 梦在手里 – 《梦在手里》; JJ Lin 林俊杰 – Zero to Hero 阴差阳错 – 《阴差阳错》
**Best Director 最佳导演**: **Chong Liung Man 张龙敏 – Beyond the aXis of Truth II 法医X档案 2**	**Best Screenplay 最佳剧本**: **Teddy Chen 陈耀 and Albert Liew Kwee Lan 刘桂岚 – Beyond the aXis of Truth II 法医X档案 2**
**Best Cameraman 最佳摄影**: **Steve Wong Kwok Chung 黄国钟 – A Life of Hope 活下去**	**Best Music & Sound Design 最佳音乐与音效设计**: **Thong Meng Sun 唐明心, Teng Kim Lian 陈金莲 and Redwan Ali – The Dragon Heroes 赤子乘龙**
**Best Variety Editing 最佳剪辑-娱乐节目**: **Lilian Liu 刘丽莲 – Planet Shakers 自游疯**	**Best Promotional Video 最佳宣传短片**: **Chang Yingying 郑莹莹 – Heartbeat 抢救心跳**
**Best Variety Producer 最佳综艺编导**: **Lim Shiong Chiang 林雄强 – Project SuperStar (Grand Finals) 绝对SuperStar（总决赛）**	**Best Variety Research Writer 最佳综艺资料撰稿**: **Wen-Pin Weng 翁文彬 – Project SuperStar (Grand Finals) 绝对SuperStar（总决赛）**; **Tan Boon Chong 陈文聪 – Say It If You Dare 有话好好说**
**Top-rated Drama Serial 最高收视率电视剧**: **Zero to Hero 阴差阳错**
**Best News Story 最佳新闻报道**: **Serene Loo 吕诗琳 – 2004 Tsunami Live from Phuket 世纪大海啸，普吉岛现场报道**
**Best Current Affairs Story 最佳时事报道**: **Frontline 前线追踪 – Tsunami's Tragedy - First Four Days in Phuket 海啸之灾：普吉岛的前四天，犹如人间地狱**

=== Main ceremony ===
Winners and nominees:

**Best Drama Serial 最佳电视剧**: **A New Life 有福**; Beyond The aXis of Truth II 法医X档案II; Portrait of Home I 同心圆I; The Champion 任我遨游; The Dragon Heroes 赤子乘龙	**Best Variety/Info-ed Programme 最佳综艺节目**: **Say It If You Dare 有话好好说**; 101 Shopping Guide 陪你去Shopping; Love Bites 缘来就是你; Rail Adventure 男得风光; Shoot! 有话就说
**Best Variety Special 最佳综艺特备节目**: **Ren Ci Charity Show 2005 仁心慈爱照万千 2005**; Lunar New Year's Eve Special 2005 天鸡报喜贺新春; NKF Charity Show 2005 (show 1) 群星照亮千万心之星光璀璨耀天地; Project SuperStar Grand Finals 绝对SuperStar 总决赛; Star Awards 2004 红星大奖2004	**Most Popular Newcomer 最受欢迎新人奖**: **Jesseca Liu 刘芷绚**; Ezann Lee 李之仪; Julian Hee 许立桦; Christina Lim 林佩芬; Serene Loo 吕诗琳
**Best Actor 最佳男主角**: **Chen Hanwei 陈汉玮 - A Life of Hope 活下去**; Adrian Pang 彭耀顺 - Portrait of Home I 同心圆I; Christopher Lee 李名顺 - A New Life 有福; Huang Wenyong 黄文永 - Destiny 梦在手里; Tay Ping Hui 郑斌辉 - A Life of Hope 活下去	**Best Actress 最佳女主角**: **Huang Biren 黄碧仁 - My Lucky Charm 情来运转**; Cynthia Koh 许美珍 - Portrait of Home I 同心圆I; Fann Wong 范文芳 - Beautiful Illusions 镜中人; Jacelyn Tay 郑秀珍 - You Are the One 1/2缘分; Yvonne Lim 林湘萍 - A New Life 有福
**Best Supporting Actor 最佳男配角**: **Cavin Soh 苏智诚 - Portrait of Home I 同心圆I**; Alan Tern 唐育书 - Double Happiness II 喜临门II; Andrew Seow 萧乙铭 - A New Life 有福; Darren Lim 林明伦 - A New Life 有福; Yao Wenlong 姚玟隆 - My Mighty-in-Laws 野蛮亲家	**Best Supporting Actress 最佳女配角**: **Yvonne Lim 林湘萍 - Portrait of Home I 同心圆I**; Carole Lin 林晓佩 - Zero To Hero 阴差阳错; Hong Hui Fang 洪慧芳 - Double Happiness II 喜临门II; Jesseca Liu 刘芷绚 - Portrait of Home I 同心圆I; Vivian Lai 赖怡伶 - Double Happiness II 喜临门II
**Best Comedy Performer 最佳喜剧演员**: **Bryan Wong 王禄江 - KP Club 鸡婆俱乐部**; Marcus Chin 陈建彬 - King of Variety III 周五娱乐王III; Mark Lee 李国煌 - KP Club 鸡婆俱乐部; Patricia Mok 莫小玲 - KP Club 鸡婆俱乐部; Zhang Wen Xiang 张汶祥 - Family Combo II 门当户对II	**Best Variety Show Host 最佳综艺主持人**: **Quan Yi Fong 权怡凤 - Love Bites 缘来就是你**; Bryan Wong 王禄江 - 101 Shopping Guide 陪你去Shopping; Jeff Wang 王建復 - Project SuperStar Grand Finals 绝对SuperStar 总决赛; Kym Ng 鍾琴 - Love Bites 缘来就是你; Mark Lee 李国煌 - Say It If You Dare 有话好好说
**Best News & Current Affairs Presenter 最佳新闻播报/时事主持人**: **Tung Soo Hua**; Chun Guek Lay 曾月丽; Lin Qi Yuan 林启元; Ng Siew Leng 黄秀玲; Serene Loo 吕诗琳

=== Special award ===
This award is a special achievement award given out to artiste(s) who have achieved a maximum of 10 popularity awards over 10 years. Top 10 winning years the recipients were awarded together are highlighted in boldface.

**All Time Favourite Artiste** **超级红星**	**Fann Wong 范文芳**	**1995**｜**1996**｜**1997**｜**1998**｜**1999**｜**2000**｜**2001**｜**2002**｜**2003**｜**2004**
**All Time Favourite Artiste** **超级红星**	**Xie Shaoguang 谢韶光**	**1995**｜**1996**｜**1997**｜**1998**｜**1999**｜**2000**｜**2001**｜**2002**｜**2003**｜**2004**

=== Top 10 awards ===
Artistes	Results
Top 10 Most Popular Male Artistes 十大最受欢迎男艺人
Jeff Wang 王建复	
Marcus Chin 陈建彬	
Huang Wenyong 黄文永	
**Vincent Ng 翁清海**	4
**Edmund Chen 陈之财**	5
Dennis Chew 周崇庆	
**Qi Yuwu 戚玉武**	2
Henry Thia 程旭辉	
**Terence Cao 曹国辉**	7
Guo Liang 郭亮	
**Gurmit Singh 葛米星**	3
Adrian Pang 彭耀顺	
**Chen Hanwei 陈汉玮**	5
**Tay Ping Hui 郑斌辉**	5
Dasmond Koh 许振荣	
**Bryan Wong 王禄江**	3
Chen Shucheng 陈澍承	
**Mark Lee 李国煌**	7
Moses Lim 林益民	
**Christopher Lee 李铭顺**	7
Top 10 Most Popular Female Artistes 十大最受欢迎女艺人
**Michelle Chong 庄米雪**	1
Fiona Xie 谢宛谕	
Bukoh Mary 巫许玛莉	
Felicia Chin 陈凤玲	
Diana Ser 徐秀盈	
**Jeanette Aw 欧萱**	3
Ivy Lee 李锦梅	
**Xiang Yun 向云**	6
**Michelle Chia 谢韵仪**	2
**Chen Liping 陈莉萍**	**10**
Kym Ng 鐘琴	
Pan Ling Ling 潘玲玲	
**Quan Yifeng 权怡凤**	1
Jin Yinji 金银姬	
**Joanne Peh 白薇秀**	2
Yvonne Lim 林湘萍	
**Rui En 芮恩**	1
**Huang Biren 黄碧仁**	8
**Jacelyn Tay 郑秀珍**	7
Patricia Mok 莫小玲	

== Guests performers ==
The following individuals presented awards or performed musical numbers.

=== Backstage ===
Artistes / Special guests
CEO, MediaCorp; Lucas Chow 周永强	Gave out award for Best Director, Best Screenplay, Best Variety Producer, Best Variety Research Writer and Top-rated Drama Serial
Patty Hou	Presented Best Theme Song, Best Music & Audio Editing and Best Variety Editing
Kang Kang	Presented Young Talent, Best Cameraman and Best Promotional Video
Patrick Tse	Presented Best News Story and Best Current Affairs Story

=== Main Ceremony ===
Artistes / Special guests
Gao Zhisen 高智森 / Jack Neo	Presenter of the award for Best Drama Serial
Tien Hsin 天心 / Kang Kang	Presenter of the award for Best Supporting Actor and Best Supporting Actress
Patrick Tse / Lydia Sum	Presenter of the award for Best Variety Show and Best Variety Special
Tony Fish 大炳	Presenter of the award for Best Comedic Performer
President of Singapore S. R. Nathan	Gave out award for All-time Favorite Artiste
Mickey Huang / Chew Chor Meng	Presenter of the award for Most Popular Newcomer
Representative, Singapore Chinese Chamber of Commerce and Industry; Claire Chiang	Presenter of the award for Best News & Current Affairs Presenter
Mickey Huang / Kang Kang	Presenter of the award for Best Variety Show Host
Peter Chan / Zhou Xun	Presenter of the award for Best Actor and Best Actress
Andy Hui / Stephanie Shiao	Presenter of the award for Top 10 Most Favourite Male Artistes
Christy Chung / Zoe Tay	Presenter of the award for Top 10 Most Favourite Female Artistes
Minister of the Prime Minister's Office and Second Minister, Finance and Transport; Lim Hwee Hua 陈惠华	
