= Mrs P.I. =

- 查某人
- Genre: Women; Investigations; Idol drama / Comedy
- Starring: Michelle Chong; Cynthia Koh; Apple Hong; Zhang Zhenhuan; Zheng Geping; San Yow; Cavin Soh
- Opening theme: 等 Wait by Liu Hui Qi & Wang Min Hui
- Ending theme: 后退 Retreat by Liu Hui Qi
- Country of origin: Singapore
- Original language: Mandarin
- No. of episodes: 20

Production
- Running time: approx. 45 minutes

Original release
- Network: MediaCorp Channel 8
- Release: 8 November – 3 December 2010

Related
- The Score; Breakout

Mrs P.I. (Chinese: 查某人) is a Singaporean Chinese drama which was telecasted on Singapore's free-to-air channel, MediaCorp Channel 8. It stars Michelle Chong, Cynthia Koh, Apple Hong, Zhang Zhenhuan, Zheng Geping, Yao Wenlong and Cavin Soh as the cast of the series. It made its debut on 8 November 2010 and ended on 3 December 2010. This drama serial consists of 20 episodes, and was screened on every weekday night at 9:00 pm. The encore is being made from 2 November 2011 to 29 November 2011 at every weekday at 5:30pm.

The series title (pronounced "zha boh lang") is the Teochew word and Singlish colloquialism for "woman".

== Cast ==
- Michelle Chong as Dai Xiu Mei
- Cynthia Koh as Yun Fei Xue
- Apple Hong as Qiu Shuang Xi (Phyllis)
- Zheng Geping as Xiu Mei's husband
- Zhang Zhenhuan as Fly (Gao Xiang)
- Yao Wenlong as Chen Wei Zhong
- Cavin Soh as Yong Jun
- Alan Tern as Zhang Jia Qiang
- May Phua as Tiffany
- Joey Fung as Narong (You You)
- Zhang Wei as Chen Cai Fa
- Kimberly Chia as Jia Xin
- Zong Zijie as Tian Yang

== Production ==
This drama's original name was Goddesses of Justice (simplified Chinese: 正义女神). Zhang Jiaqiang's lover's name, Pan Lingling, comes from the Pan Lingling, another Singaporean actress.

== Reception ==
Average viewership for each episode is 830,000.

=== Accolades ===
Organisation	Year	Award	Nominee(s)	Result	Ref.
Star Awards	2011	Most Favourite On-screen couple 最喜爱银幕情侣	Yao Wenlong and Cynthia Koh	Nominated	

== See also ==
- List of programmes broadcast by Mediacorp Channel 8
