= Baby Bonus (TV series) =

TV series in Singapore

- 添丁发财
- Genre: Family
- Starring: Felicia Chin; Tay Ping Hui; Jesseca Liu; Darren Lim
- Country of origin: Singapore
- Original language: Chinese
- No. of episodes: 23

Production
- Running time: approx. 45 minutes per episode

Original release
- Network: MediaCorp Channel 8
- Release: 30 September – 30 October 2009

Baby Bonus (Chinese: 添丁发财) is a Singaporean Chinese drama which was telecasted on Singapore's free-to-air channel, MediaCorp Channel 8. It stars Felicia Chin, Tay Ping Hui, Jesseca Liu & Darren Lim as the casts of the series. It made its debut on 30 September 2009 and ended on 30 October 2009. This drama serial consists of 23 episodes, and was screened on every weekday night at 9:00 pm.

== Cast ==
=== Main ===
- Felicia Chin as 黄丽萍 Huang Li Ping
- Jesseca Liu as 郑晓阳 Zheng Xiao Yang
- Darren Lim as 郑国安 Zheng Guo An
- Tay Ping Hui as 李佳城 Li Jiacheng, Li is a simple and good-natured person who is in love with Zheng Xiao Yang but is taking care of Huang's child.
- Leroy Chng as Olympic

=== Supporting ===
- Apple Hong as Angel
- Terence Cao as Simon Koh 许晴光
- Xiang Yun as 黄美玲 Huang Mei Ling
- Zhu Hou Ren as 郑发材 Zheng Fa Cai
- Lin Meijiao as 龙宝音 Long Bao Yin
- Jerry Yeo as Ah Xiang

== Accolades ==
Year	Award	Category	Nominee(s)	Result	Ref
2010	Star Awards	Favourite Male Character	Tay Ping Hui	Nominated	
2010	Star Awards	Favourite Female Character	Felicia Chin	Nominated	
2010	Star Awards	Best Supporting Actress	Xiang Yun	Nominated	
