= Her Many Faces =

- 有你终生美丽
- Starring: Wayne Chua; Cynthia Koh; Phyllis Sim; Lavin Seow; Alan Yun; Alan Tern
- Music by: 单身潜逃 by Penny Dai
- Countries of origin: Malaysia; Singapore
- Original language: Mandarin
- No. of episodes: 30

Production
- Running time: approx. 45 minutes

Original release
- Network: ntv7 (Malaysia); MediaCorp Channel 8 (Singapore)
- Release: 23 July – 2 September 2008

Her Many Faces (simplified Chinese: 有你终生美丽) is a Singaporean and Malaysian co-production Chinese drama which was being telecast on Malaysia's free-to-air channel, ntv7. It stars Wayne Chua, Cynthia Koh, Phyllis Sim, Lavin Seow, Alan Yun & Alan Tern as the casts of the series. It made its debut on 23 July 2008 and ended its run on 2 September 2008. The drama consists of a total of 27 episodes and was screened on every weekday night, at 9.45 pm. It was also broadcast on MediaCorp Channel 8 on Mondays to Fridays, from 17 June 2010 and ended its run on 23 July 2010.

== Synopsis ==
Upon graduating, Jiawen (Cynthia Koh) joins E-max, a distributor dealing in high-end technology products, as a salesperson. Due to her hardworking and honest nature, within a short period of time, she is promoted to brand assistant. Shuling (Lavin Seow) is a friend of Jiawen's from university.

Both young ladies join E-max around the same time. On the surface, it appears that Shuling is very friendly towards Jiawen. However, she is in fact jealous of the latter because she is doing better than her in both career and love.

Meishan (Phyllis Sim) is Jiawen's good friend from secondary school. She has a crazy and fun-loving character, but she is a capable assistant of ZiKang's in Lin Zhi Technologies. ZiKang (Alan Tern) is the senior brand manager at Lin Zhi Technologies with a successful career. However, his wife finds out that he has been unfaithful and insists on divorcing him. ZiKang is unable to save his marriage. Meishan is also having an affair with a married man. She feels that true love is all about sacrifices. Therefore, she carries on suffering in silence as the third party.

ZiKang feels that there is no hope for her relationship. Later on, ZiKang begins to feel attracted to Meishan's lovable and unique character. He wishes to woo her, but Meishan does not believe that a playboy like ZiKang would fall for her.

To climb to a higher rank, Ella (Wayne Chua) makes use of Jimmy, an assistant brand manager at Lin Zhi Technologies, to get a position in the company. Jimmy (Kelvin Liew) feels that Ella's competitive edge, enthusiasm and confidence reminds him of himself. Thus, they begin making use of each other to attain their individual goals in their respective careers. However, Jimmy makes a mistake at work one day and pushes the blame on to Ella to save himself. This causes them to fall out and become enemies.

Ella joins E-max under Meishan's recommendation. When Shuling pulls a trick to sabotage Jiawen, Ella takes the opportunity to take over Jiawen's position. During this time, ZiJian suggests a break-up with Jiawen, because of Shuling's intentional disparagement. Jiawen suffers yet another blow. When she is at her lowest and most depressed, Jiawen's junior and good friend, Yiping (Kyo) stays by her side to give her encouragement. They slowly begin to fall in love, but Jiawen has always minded the fact that Yiping is younger than her.

Yiping's persistence and patience finally pays off and moves Jiawen. However, Jiawen still holds a torch for ZiJian (Alan Yun) deep inside. Yiping knows that Jiawen has not forgotten ZiJian, but continues to stay by her side. He compromises and gives in to her, hoping that one day she will break free of the inhibitions of seeing a younger man.

After Ella leaves the company, Jimmy realises that he has fallen in love with her. He tries every way to make amends and apologise to her, and finally gains her forgiveness. One night, they get drunk and end up having sexual intimacy. Soon after, Ella discovers that she is pregnant. Refusing to give up and jeopardise her career, she plans to get an abortion. As a result, she suffers from depression.

Jimmy finds out that Ella is pregnant with his child and immediately stops her from going through the abortion. He confesses that he is an orphan and has always wished for a happy family. Jimmy decides to give up a good opportunity for advancement at work, and applies for a long holiday to take care of Ella back in their hometown. Ella deeply appreciates his sincerity. She decides to marry him and keep the baby.

Shuling gets close to her boss Frankie Chen Jinghua and tries her best to please him. She goes so far as to even become his mistress. With her special status, Shuling continuously makes things difficult for Jiawen at work. She even slanders Jiawen behind her back, thus making Frankie distrust Jiawen. Jiawen reaches a point where she can tolerate no more, and decides to retaliate. Ella decides to join hands with Jiawen to deal with Shuling, after some careful consideration.

The boss's wife finds out about Frankie's affair with Shuling, and Shuling is forced to resign. Shuling is furious and feels that the whole world has done her wrong. One day, she loses control of her emotions and causes the death of her childhood sweetheart. From then onwards, Shuling starts to become mentally unstable.

ZiKang tries his best to change himself so that he can be a better match for Meishan. He works hard to show his love for her through actions, again and again. Meishan is finally moved by his sincerity and agrees to his marriage proposal. Jiawen sees that Ella and Meishan have both found happiness with their life partners, and is happy for them. Yiping proposes to Jiawen, but she hesitates in her answer. At this point, ZiJian realises that the one he loves most is still Jiawen. He wishes to start afresh with her. Caught between two men who love her, Jiawen is unsure of how she should end this love triangle...

Can these four career women find true love and success in their life journey?

== Casts ==
- Cynthia Koh as Zheng Jia Wen
- Wayne Chua as Ella Cai Zhi Yun
- Phyllis Sim as Lin Mei Shan
- Lavin Seow Yi Ting as Shu Ling
- Alan Yun as Gao Zi Jian
- Alan Tern as Gao Zi Kang
- Kelvin Liew as Jimmy Zhang Wen Ren
- Kyo Chen as Yang Yi Ping
- William San as Patrick Ma Shi Xuan
- Tracy Lee as Sandy (office staff)

== See also ==
- List of programmes broadcast by Mediacorp Channel 8
- ntv7
