= Crouching Tiger Hidden Ghost =

- 卧虎藏鬼
- Genre: Comedy; Drama
- Directed by: Oh Liang Cai; Regina Wong Xiao Yi
- Starring: Jesseca Liu; Bonnie Loo; Zong Zijie; Jeremy Chan
- Country of origin: Singapore
- Original language: Mandarin
- No. of episodes: 20

Production
- Producer: Chow Wai Thong

Original release
- Network: Mediacorp Channel 8
- Release: July 5 – July 30, 2021

Crouching Tiger Hidden Ghost (Chinese: 卧虎藏鬼) is a Singaporean dramedy produced and telecast on Mediacorp Channel 8. It stars Jesseca Liu, Bonnie Loo, Zong Zijie and Jeremy Chan.

== Cast ==
=== Main ===
- Jesseca Liu as Lin Xiao Fang
- Bonnie Loo as Angie
- Zong Zijie as Ah Lun
- Jeremy Chan as Ma Da

=== Supporting ===
- Ian Fang as Xie Weixiang
- Sora Ma as Ah Jie
- Allan Wu as Evan Lau
- Teddy Tang as Jeffrey Tan

=== Guest and minor ===
- Tay Ping Hui as Ralph Lee
- Darren Lim as Ah Kun
- Eelyn Kok as Emily Tan
- Lina Ng as Leong
- Huang Jianshun as Zhou Xiaoji
- Xenia as Zhou Xiayun
- Gin Moh as Iceboy
- CKay Lim as Mr. Ho
- Xixi Lim as Ying Hou
- Jalyn Han as Grandma
- Cassandra See as Lina
- Regina Lim as Selena
- Benjamin Josiah Tan as Lucas

== Accolades ==
Year	Accolades	Category	Nominees	Result
2022	Star Awards	Best Theme Song	"乱掉"	Nominated
2022	Star Awards	Best Actor	Jeremy Chan	Nominated
2022	Star Awards	Best Actress	Jesseca Liu	Nominated
2022	Star Awards	Best Drama Serial	Crouching Tiger Hidden Ghost	Nominated
