= Yao Wenlong =

Singapore based Malaysian actor and businessman (born 1970)

- Born: 14 November 1970 (age 56); Johor Bahru, Malaysia
- Other name: San Yow
- Occupations: Actor; businessman
- Years active: 1993-present
- Spouse: Jenny Tsai
- Children: 2
- Awards: Full list

Current stage name
- Traditional Chinese: 姚彣隆
- Simplified Chinese: 姚彣隆
- Hanyu Pinyin: Yáo Wénlóng
- Jyutping: Jiu4 Man4 Lung4
- Hokkien POJ: Iâu Bûn-liông
- Tâi-lô: Iâu Bûn-liông

Birth name
- Traditional Chinese: 姚文龍
- Simplified Chinese: 姚文龙
- Hanyu Pinyin: Yáo Wénlóng

Former stage name
- Traditional Chinese: 姚玟隆
- Simplified Chinese: 姚玟隆
- Hanyu Pinyin: Yáo Wénlóng

Yao Wenlong (born 14 November 1970) is a Malaysian actor and businessman who lives in Johor Bahru and works in Singapore and Malaysia.

== Career ==
Yao entered the local television scene after winning the Star Search 1993 (Male category) organised by then Singapore Broadcasting Corporation (now MediaCorp). Within a year, he won the Most Popular Newcomer award in Star Awards 1994 and the Best Supporting Actor award in Star Awards 2001 for his role as a sissy in drama Looking for Stars.

Besides television dramas, he appeared in the popular sitcom, My Genie alongside Fiona Xie and Huang Yiliang. Yao starred in the 80 episode long Kinship series in 2007, where he collaborated with Jesseca Liu, Elvin Ng, Ann Kok, Cynthia Koh and Xiang Yun. In 2008, he played butcher Liu Yidao in the highly acclaimed serial The Little Nyonya, garnering him yet another Best Supporting Actor nomination.

== Personal life ==
Yao is married to Jenny Tsai, who is 12 years younger than him. They have a son, Jianyu, and a daughter, Luohui. In November 2022, Yao and his family bought and moved into a double-storey townhouse in Johor Bahru that was worth SGD$400K.

Yao is also involved in numerous business ventures in Malaysia including the F&B business Sun Gourmet Kitchen which sells pao fan and also a defunct mobile phone shop and tarot card business, among others.

Yao has changed his Chinese name twice − from his birth name "姚文龙" to "姚玟隆" in 2001, and to "姚彣隆" in 2017, of which he still uses to date. All his Chinese names have the same pronunciation, though with different meanings in Chinese. Yao said that he had changed his Chinese names to better his work prospects.

== Filmography ==
=== Film ===
Year	Title	Role	Notes	Ref
1995	Sea Eagle (海岸猎鹰)	Zhang Zhimin	Telemovie	

=== Television series ===
Year	Title	Role	Notes	Ref
1991	Romance of the Season 恋曲1991	Robert	Cameo	
1992	The Dating Game 爱情乒乓球	Postman	Cameo	
1993	Happy Reunion 年年有鱼	Hao Laiwu		
1994	Crazy Duet 叔侄俩疯狂	Tang Shan Yi Fu		
1994	Against All Odds 共闯荆途	Li Hongfan		
1995	Neighbourhood Heroes 大英雄小人物	Ye Weixin		
1995	Secret Files 机密档案	Guo Haoming		
1995	Dr Justice II 法医故事II之《午夜警钟》	Cheng Zhaotang		
1996	Triumph Over The Green 爱拼球会赢	Yang Cong		
1996	Royal Battle of Wits 妙师爷三斗毒太监	Mo Weimin		
1996	The Legends of Jigong	Golden Boy		
1997	Places in My Heart 万里情空	Zhuang Yaoguo		
1997	Playing to Win Uncle当自强	Bao Zhengkang		
1997	Not The Facts 迷离剧场 之《红色疑惑》	Xue Shiwei		
1998	The Return of the Condor Heroes	Ye Luqi		
1998	Singapore Short Stories 小说剧场 之《安琪儿的微笑》	Su Kaiwen		
1998	Myths and Legends of Singapore 石叻坡传说 之《讲古奇冤》	Chen Tianding		
1999	Bright Future 同一片蓝天	Chen Zhilong		
1999	P.I. Blues 乌龙档案	Li Delong		
2000	Hainan Kopi Tales	Long Yongan		
2000	Looking for Stars	Tequila		
2001	My Genie 我爱精灵	Jian Yuanbao		
2001	You Light Up My Life 如何对你说	Wang Haowei		
2001	In Pursuit of Peace	Chen Yong		
2001	Beyond the Axis of Truth	Mike		
2001	The Hotel	Dr Long		
2002	Health Matters 一切由慎开始 之《我的太太是混血儿》	Tian Guo		
2002	Viva Le Famille	Sun Yutai		
2002	The Vagrant	Liu Dehua (Yi Yang Zi)		
2002	The Unbeatables III	Jiang Xueming		
2002	My Genie 2 我爱精灵2	Jian Yuanbao		
2003	Holland V	Wu Ah Ming		
2003	Viva Le Famille II	Sun Yutai		
2004	The Crime Hunters	CNA		
2004	An Ode to Life	Zhang Wenlu		
2004	Double Happiness	Tang Jiaming		
2004	Double Happiness II	Tang Jiaming		
2004	My Mighty-in-Laws	911		
2005	Portrait of Home	Zhou Dashan		
2005	Portrait of Home II	Zhou Dashan		
2005	Zero to Hero	Ah Bang		
2006	Family Matters	Sun Jia Fu		
2007	Happily Ever After	Yang Jian (Erlangshen)		
2007	Making Miracles	A-han	Cameo	
2007	Kinship I	Chen Anping		
2007	Kinship II	Chen Anping		
2008	La Femme	Zhang Jiajie		
2008	Nanny Daddy	He Mingfeng		
2008	The Little Nyonya	Liu Yidao		
2009	Housewives' Holiday	Zhang Jiasheng		
2009	Your Hand In Mine	Zheng Shuiguo		
2010	The Family Court	Huang Guanying		
2010	Mrs P.I.	Chen Weizhong		
2011	A Tale of 2 Cities	Pan Weisong		
2011	Secrets for Sale	Zhang Zihao		
2011	Devotion	Hong Keqin		
2011	On the Fringe 2011	Four-Eyed Chicken		
2011	Bountiful Blessings	Zhang Dan		
2011	A Song to Remember	Luo Dada		
2012	Joys of Life	Sun Yaping "Roti"		
2012	The Quarters	Bai Jinchuan		
2012	Poetic Justice	Ah De		
2012	It Takes Two	Hao Youcai		
2013	Sudden	Kang Wenxing		
2013	Gonna Make It	Zhang Zhenggang		
2014	Yes We Can!	Li Xiaoyou		
2014	Soup of Life	Li Chengyuan		
2014	Blessings	Lian Shuangxi		
2014	Three Wishes	Zhao Yaozu		
2015	Tiger Mum	Chen Kai		
2015	Super Senior	Guan Qiming		
2015	The Dream Makers II	Zheng Shoude	Cameo	
2016	House of Fortune	Wu Guolun		
2016	Peace & Prosperity	Xiao Tiantian		
2016	Soul Reaper 勾魂使者	Lin Ping'an		
2017	Dream Coder	Xu Guangda		
2017	My Friends from Afar	Zhou Zhiqiang		
2018	Reach For The Skies	Hong Qianbei		
2018	A Million Dollar Dream	Ma Tongren		
2018	Blessing 2 祖先保佑 2	Lian Shuangxi		
2019	Hello From The Other Side – Its Time 阴错阳差 — 时辰到	Bill		
2019	Dear Neighbours 我的左邻右里	Yu Xiaolong		
2019	Old Is Gold-The Bliss Keeper 老友万岁之守护幸福	Li Ye	Cameo	
2020	All Around You 回路网	Han Wentu		
2020	A Quest to Heal	Zeng Xiao Sa		
2021	A Whole World Difference 都市狂想	Fang Dashou		
2022	Your World in Mine	Zheng Jianqiang		
2023	Strike Gold	Mei Youyong		
2023	Family Ties	Chen Zhitong		
2023	The Sky is Still Blue			
2023	My One and Only	Wan Zixiong		

== Compilation album ==
Year	English title	Mandarin title
2016	MediaCorp Music Lunar New Year Album 16	新传媒群星金猴添喜庆

== Awards and nominations ==
Year	Ceremony	Category	Nominated work	Result	Ref
1994	Star Awards	Best Newcomer	—N/a	Won	
1995	Star Awards	Top 10 Most Popular Male Artistes	—N/a	Nominated	
1996	Star Awards	Top 10 Most Popular Male Artistes	—N/a	Nominated	
1997	Star Awards	Top 10 Most Popular Male Artistes	—N/a	Nominated	
1998	Star Awards	Top 10 Most Popular Male Artistes	—N/a	Nominated	
2000	Star Awards	Best Supporting Actor	Hainan Kopi Tales (as Long Yong'an)	Nominated	
2001	Star Awards	Best Supporting Actor	Looking for Stars (as Tequila)	Won	
2002	Star Awards	Best Supporting Actor	Viva Le Famille 1 (as Sun Yutai)	Nominated	
2003	Star Awards	Best Supporting Actor	Holland V (as Li A'ming)	Nominated	
2005	Star Awards	Best Supporting Actor	My Mighty-In-Laws (as 911)	Nominated	
2007	Star Awards	Best Supporting Actor	Happily Ever After (as Yang Jian)	Nominated	
2009	Star Awards	Best Supporting Actor	The Little Nyonya (as Liu Yidao)	Nominated	
2011	Star Awards	Best Supporting Actor	The Family Court (as Huang Guanying)	Nominated	
2011	Star Awards	Favourite Onscreen Couple		Nominated	
2013	Star Awards	Top 10 Most Popular Male Artistes	—N/a	Nominated	
2017	Star Awards	Top 10 Most Popular Male Artistes	—N/a	Nominated	
2017	Star Awards	London ChocoRoll Happiness Award	—N/a	Nominated	
2014	Star Awards	Most Popular Regional Artiste (Cambodia)	—N/a	Nominated	
2019	Star Awards	Top 10 Most Popular Male Artistes	—N/a		
2021	Star Awards	Top 10 Most Popular Male Artistes	—N/a	Nominated	
2022	Star Awards	Top 10 Most Popular Male Artistes	—N/a	Nominated	
2023	Star Awards	Top 10 Most Popular Male Artistes	—N/a	Nominated	
2023	Star Awards	Favourite CP	Your World in Mine (as Zheng Jianqiang)	Nominated	
2024	Star Awards	Top 10 Most Popular Male Artistes	—N/a	Nominated	
