= Alan Tern =

Singaporean actor (born 1976)

- Born: 31 March 1976 (age 50); Singapore
- Other name: Tang Yushu
- Education: The Chinese High School; Hwa Chong Junior College; Nanyang Technological University
- Occupations: Actor; businessman
- Years active: 2001–present
- Spouse: Priscelia Chan (m. 2007)

Chinese name
- Traditional Chinese: 唐育書
- Simplified Chinese: 唐育书
- Hanyu Pinyin: Táng Yùshū

Alan Tern Yoke Cher (born 31 March 1976) is a Singaporean actor and businessman. He was a full-time Mediacorp artiste from 2001 to 2011.

== Early life ==
Tern was educated at The Chinese High School and Hwa Chong Junior College. Prior to joining Star Search he graduated from Nanyang Technological University with a degree in accountancy.

== Career ==
Tern was a finalist in the 2001 Star Search Singapore, and he joined MediaCorp after the competition. He made his debut in the sitcom My Genie not long after signing on and also appeared in The Hotel. Tern's acting in Double Happiness earned him a Best Supporting Actor Award nomination at the Star Awards 2005.

Tern left the entertainment industry as he has announced his decision to leave MediaCorp after filming A Song to Remember, in which he played the abusive husband of his wife's character. He did not rule a return to acting but stated that he wanted to concentrate on running his business for the time being.

== Personal life ==
Tern currently runs his own eyewear business Acespex Vision. He married actress Priscelia Chan on 6 October 2007.

== Filmography ==
=== Television series ===
| Year | Title | Role | Notes |
|---|---|---|---|
| 2001 | My Genie (我爱精灵) | Lub Lub / Xiaoming | |
| 2001 | The Hotel | Wang Yafu | |
| 2002 | Springs of Life | Cai Daming | |
| 2002 | First Touch | | Channel 5 production |
| 2002 | No Problem (考试家族) | | |
| 2003 | True Heroes | CPL Jiang Yijie | |
| 2003 | A Toast of Love | | |
| 2003 | My Love, My Home (同一屋檐下) | | |
| 2004 | To Mum with Love (非一般妈妈) | | |
| 2004 | An Ode to Life | Zhang Rui'an | |
| 2004 | Double Happiness | Wenjie / Wenxiong | |
| 2004 | Double Happiness II | Wenjie / Wenxiong | |
| 2005 | Portrait of Home | Chen Shaodong | |
| 2005 | Portrait of Home II | Chen Shaodong | |
| 2005 | A New Life | Ah Ler | |
| 2006 | The Shining Star | | |
| 2006 | CID | Zhang Jiasheng | |
| 2006 | Angel Lover | | |
| 2007 | Kinship I | Hong Zhaoyang | |
| 2007 | Kinship II | Hong Zhaoyang | |
| 2007 | Man of the House | Zhen Jian'er | |
| 2007 | Metamorphosis | Liu Hansheng | |
| 2007 | The Golden Path | | |
| 2008 | Her Many Faces | Gao Zikang | |
| 2008 | Crime Busters x 2 | Tang Jiasheng | |
| 2008 | Perfect Cut | Himself | Channel U production |
| 2009 | Reunion Dinner | Hu Daxiong | |
| 2009 | Table of Glory | Liu Yun | |
| 2010 | Happy Family | Alex | |
| 2010 | Priceless Wonder | Xu Guoxing | |
| 2010 | Point of Entry | Edmund Seng Yue Fong | Channel 5 production |
| 2010 | Precious Babes | Jovan | |
| 2010 | The Family Court | Liu Yacai | |
| 2010 | Mrs P.I. | Zhang Jiaqiang | |
| 2011 | On the Fringe | Jack | |
| 2011 | A Song to Remember | Wang Jintu | |
| 2021 | My Mini-me and Me (很久以后的未来) | Zhang Zhendong's father | |

=== Film ===
| Year | Title | Role | Notes | Ref |
|---|---|---|---|---|
| 2004 | The Eye 2 | Policeman in hospital | | |

=== Television show appearances ===
| Year | Title |
|---|---|
| 2009 | Stars for a Cause (明星志工队) |
| 2011 | Silver Tribute Charity Night (万千金辉照乐年) |

== Awards and nominations ==
| Organisation | Year | Category | Nominated work | Result | Ref. |
|---|---|---|---|---|---|
| Star Awards | 2005 | Best Supporting Actor | Double Happiness | Nominated | |
