= Darren Lim =

Singaporean actor and host (born 1972)

- Born: 30 September 1972 (age 54); Singapore
- Occupations: Actor; host; businessman
- Years active: 1997−present
- Spouse: Evelyn Tan (m. 2004)
- Children: 4

Chinese name
- Traditional Chinese: 林明倫
- Simplified Chinese: 林明伦
- Hanyu Pinyin: Lín Mínglún

Darren Lim (born 30 September 1972) is a Singaporean actor and television host, who was a full-time Mediacorp artiste from 1997 to 2016.

== Career ==
Lim began his career as a singer. He signed with a Hong Kong record company and was sent to Hong Kong for musical training. While in Hong Kong, Lim acted in Bad Boys In Wonderland (坏孩子俱乐部) as the male lead. British film director Peter Greenaway went to Hong Kong to look for an Asian male actor for a role in The Pillow Book which Lim auditioned thrice for the role. Greenaway was satisfied with Lim and offered the role to Lim. However, as the film required Lim to be naked on the screen, his talent agency rejected the role as they were worried that exposure would hurt his future career. Lim also acted in a small role in What A Wonderful World.

Returning to Singapore, Lim eventually joined Television Corporation of Singapore in the mid-1990s as a TV host.

Lim joined SPH MediaWorks in 2000 and was transferred back to Mediacorp when both companies merged in 2005. Since rejoining Mediacorp, his profile rose considerably and was nominated for the Best Supporting Actor several times, most notably for his role in The Little Nyonya.

Lim left Mediacorp in May 2012 after some 20 years in showbiz to work at his father's business and spend more time with his family. He has since returned to acting, but in a freelance capacity.

== Personal life ==
Lim left school at the age of 15.

Lim met fellow artiste Evelyn Tan in 1998, during the TV remake of Beauty World for the President's Star Charity Show, with Tan as the protagonist and Lim as her love interest. Lim and Tan subsequently dated and married in 2004. The couple has four children.

== Filmography ==
=== Television series ===
Year	Title	Role	Notes	Ref
2001	Apple Pie			
2002	Cash Is King	Qi Xiao		
2002	Venture Against Time	Lu Zhixuan		
2002	Heroes of Yang	Jiang Bin		
2003	Together Whenever			
2004	Happy and Lucky			
2004	Be Somebody			
2004	Project J			
2004	Crunch Time			
2004	Zero			
2005	A New Life	Lin Laifa		
2005	Lifeline		Guest appearance	
2006	Through It All	Wu Ximing		
2006	Fairy of the Chalice			
2007	Kinship I	Xu Naifa		
2007	Kinship II	Xu Naifa		
2007	Making Miracles	Gao Zhengbang		
2008	En Bloc	Andrew Lim		
2008	Love Blossoms	Huang Yezu		
2008	The Defining Moment			
2008	The Little Nyonya	Huang Jincheng		
2009	My School Daze	Tang Andi		
2009	Baby Bonus	Zheng Guo'an		
2010	Happy Family	Dong Muxing		
2010	The Best Things in Life	Luo Jianguo		
2010	The Family Court	Xu Zhiqiang		
2010	Breakout	Wang Lianzhou		
2011	The In-Laws	Xiao Jianye		
2011	A Tale of 2 Cities	Li Zhenbang		
2012	Game Plan	Adam		
2012	Joys of Life	Cai Nan		
2013	Sudden	Joda		
2013	Marry Me	Patrick		
2014	Three Wishes	Huijing		
2014	My Secret App	Lin Yingxiong		
2015	The Journey: Our Homeland	Dai Xiaoxiong		
2015	Crescendo	David Law		
2016	The Queen	He Guoping		
2018	Doppelganger	Li Ruijie		
2019	After The Stars	Shen Bangxing		
2019	While You Were Away	Yu Guanming		
2020	Loving You	Chen Shi		
2021	CTRL	He Shaoqiang		
2021	Crouching Tiger Hidden Ghost	Ah Kun		
2022	Genie in a Cup	Ma Xiaobao		
2022	Truths About Us	Li Haoxiong		
2022	It's All Your Fault !	Chen Guoming		
2022	Love at First Bite	Ricky		
2023	Silent Walls	Wu Xinbang		
2023	Strike Gold	Sun Zigui		
2023	Oppa, Saranghae!	Michael		
2023	Shero	Dai Guowei		
2023	The Sky is Still Blue	Liang Qingtian		
2023	Whatever Will Be, Will Be	Ah Wen	Dialect series	
2023	All That Glitters	Big Boss	Special appearance	
2023	My One and Only	Patrick		
2024	Born to Shine (孺子可教也)	Chen Zheming		
2024	Kill Sera Sera	Sun De Hui	Cameo	

=== Film ===
Year	Title	Role	Notes	Ref
1995	Bad Boys In Wonderland (坏孩子俱乐部)			
1996	What A Wonderful World (奇异旅程之真心爱生命)	plain clothes dectiive		
2009	Sweet Tapioca Porridge		telemovie	

=== Selected variety show ===
Year	Title	Notes
1995 - 2000	SingaporeAnti-Drugs Campaign	
1995 - 2000	Lunar New Year Show (农历新年特备节目)	
1995 - 2000	Travel Hunt (奇趣搜搜搜)	
1995 - 2000	电视大玩家	
1995 - 2000	绝对星闻	
1995 - 2000	我们正年轻	
1995 - 2000	欢乐大放送	
2000 - 2004	周末FUN轻松Wow Wow West	
2000 - 2004	'Live'Unlimited (综艺无界限)	
2000 - 2004	Here Comes Nancy (好姨到)	
2000 - 2004	不一般见识	
2000 - 2004	Banzai My Kids (亲子兵法)	
2000 - 2004	Let's Take A Walk (今天我们逛街去)	
2005	The Amazing Health Shopper's Race	
2005	Life Scent (花花都市)	
2006	Hey Baby! (幸福密码)	
2006	Life Scent II (花花都市2)	
2006	On the Beat (都市大发现)	
2007	Adonis Beauty Chatter Box Adonis (美丽论谈)	
2007	Road Trip (Australia) (自游旅行摄)	
2008	Food Hometown (美食寻根)	
2009	Stars for a Cause (Season 1) (明星志工队)	
2009	Travel with Love	
2010	My Star Guide 5 (Shanghai, China) (我的导游是明星)	
2010	Stars for a Cause II (明星志工队2)	
2011	Culture in a Bowl (吃出一碗文化)	
2011	UnNatural	
2011	Travelogue	
2023	Wartime Food (战地食谱)	

=== Theatre ===
Year	Title	Role	Notes	Ref
1998	Beauty World	Ah Hock	TV remake for the President's Star Charity Show	
1998	Beauty World	Ah Hock	TheatreWorks' production	

== Discography ==
- 阳光系列专辑

== Awards and nominations ==
Year	Organisation	Category	Nominated work	Result	Ref
1998	Star Awards	Top 10 Most Popular Male Artistes	—N/a	Nominated	
1999	Star Awards	Top 10 Most Popular Male Artistes	—N/a	Nominated	
2005	Star Awards	Best Supporting Actor	A New Life (as Lin Laifa)	Nominated	
2007	Star Awards	Best Supporting Actor	Kinship (as Xu Naifa)	Won	
2009	Star Awards	Best Supporting Actor	The Little Nyonya (as Huang Jincheng)	Nominated	
2010	Star Awards	Best Supporting Actor	My School Daze (as Wang Andi)	Nominated	
2011	Star Awards	Best Supporting Actor	Breakout (as Wang Lianzhuo)	Nominated	
2019	Asian Rainbow TV Awards	Best Male Host Award	National Flavours 民族味	Won	
2021	Star Awards	Best Supporting Actor	While You Were Away (as Yu Guanming)	Nominated	
2021	Star Awards	Top 10 Most Popular Male Artistes	—N/a	Nominated	
2022	Star Awards	Top 10 Most Popular Male Artistes	—N/a	Nominated	
2023	Star Awards	Best Supporting Actor	Genie In A Cup (as Ma Xiaobao)	Nominated	
2023	Star Awards	Most Hated Villain	Genie In A Cup (as Ma Xiaobao)	Nominated	
2023	Star Awards	Best Programme Host	A Night Under The Stars	Nominated	
2023	Star Awards	Top 10 Most Popular Male Artistes	—N/a	Nominated	
2024	Star Awards	Best Supporting Actor	Shero (as Dai Guowei)	Nominated	
2024	Star Awards	Best Programme Host	Fixer 4	Nominated	
2024	Star Awards	Top 10 Most Popular Male Artistes	—N/a	Nominated	
2025	Star Awards	Top 10 Most Popular Male Artistes	—N/a	Nominated	
