= Cynthia Koh =

Singaporean actress (born 1974)

- Born: 25 March 1974 (age 52); Singapore
- Other name: Xu Meizhen
- Education: Saint Anthony's Canossian Secondary School
- Occupations: Actress; businesswoman
- Years active: 1992–present
- Awards: Star Awards: Best Actress 1999; Top 10 Most Popular Female Artistes 1997, 2012, 2022

Chinese name
- Simplified Chinese: 许美珍
- Hanyu Pinyin: Xǔ Měizhēn

Cynthia Koh (born 25 March 1974) is a Singaporean actress. She has appeared and starred in many television series produced by MediaCorp Channel 8 and MediaCorp Channel 5.

== Early life ==
Koh has one younger sister. Her father works in the Singapore Civil Defence Force while her mother is a housewife. Koh received her education at Saint Anthony's Canossian Secondary School.

== Career ==
While still enrolled in Singapore Broadcasting Corporation's (now MediaCorp) 10th Drama Artiste Course and after a three-month Mandarin-language training stint in Taiwan, Koh started acting at the TV station at the age of 18 in May 1992. After having acted in almost 46 dramas, Koh went on to make her debut on stage in the critically acclaimed Men at Forty-Eight in 1997. Later, she won the Best Actress Award in Star Awards 1999 with her breakthrough performance in Stepping Out, in which she played a long-suffering woman fighting against her fate.

Koh was also part of the cast in three of MediaCorp TV Channel 8's long-running dramas. The 3 long-running dramas include: Holland V (Year 2003, 125 episodes), Portrait of Home (Year 2005, 100 episodes), Kinship (Year 2007, 86 episodes). Koh's role as Fu Baozhu (傅宝珠), a greedy and bossy woman in Portrait of Home earned her a Best Actress nomination at the Star Awards 2005; the award ultimately went to Huang Biren. While filming Mediacorp Channel U's blockbuster drama Show Hand in December 2011, it was reported that Koh delayed an ovarian cyst operation to finish filming the series.

== Ventures ==
In 2015, Koh worked with actress-director Michelle Chong, former radio deejay Daniel Ong, and three other partners to open a 180-seater restaurant, Mischief, at Esplanade. She is also the national marketing director of the Singapore branch of World Ventures, an American company that offers bulk buy travel deals to its members. In 2016, it was reported that Koh led about 1,800 sales representatives, making her one of the highest ranked for the Singapore branch. In addition, Koh is also a certified practitioner in alternative healing, specializing in Reiki, the Bach flower remedy system and sound therapy.

== Filmography ==
=== Television series ===
Year	Title	Role	Notes	Ref.
1991	Romance of the Season (恋曲 1991)	Xue Ling's friend		
1992	The Dating Game (爱情乒乓球)	Lin Meifang		
1992	Terms of Endearment (戏剧人生)	Song Wentian		
1992	Love is in the Air (爱在女儿乡)	Judy		
1993	Endless Love (未了缘)	Xiao Xi		
1993	The Wilful Siblings (斗气姐妹)	Yang Xixi		
1993	Happy Reunion (年年有鱼)	Ma Yuxiang		
1994	Those Were The Days (生命擂台)	Luo Xueqi		
1994	The Challenger (勇者无惧)	Pan Jingyi		
1995	Dream Hunters (追心一族)			
1995	Over the Horizons (展翅高飞)	Xiong Haiyun		
1996	Tofu Street	Liang Simei		
1996	Royal Battle of Wit (妙师爷三斗毒太监)	Chen Wanmei		
1996	Tales of the Third Kind II (第三类剧场II 之《墙里幽魂》)	Sandy		
1996	Give Me A Break (老板放轻松)	Ye Liang / Ah Moon		
1997	Crimes and Tribulations (狮城奇案录 之《蝶印》)	Mei Xiaoyu		
1997	Sword and Honour (铁血男儿)	Wan'er		
1997	Sword and Honour (铁血男儿)	Gong Sunyan		
1998	Around People's Park (珍珠街坊)	Wang Lijuan		
1998	Myths and Legends of Singapore (石叻坡传说 之《一代狮王》)	He Jinyu		
1998	Season of Love	Xu Liwen		
1999	Stepping Out	Hongdou		
2000	Hainan Kopi Tales	Huang Liuyue		
2000	Growing Up Season 5	Tracy		
2000	@Moulmein High	Francine Ooi		
2000	Looking For Stars	Cai Feifei		
2001	Through Thick and Thin (阿灿正传)	Kailing		
2001	@Moulmein High II	Francine Ooi		
2001	The Hotel	Xu Yizhen		
2002	The Wing of Desire (天使的诱惑)	Li Wanping		
2002	@Moulmein High III	Francine Ooi		
2003	Holland V	Mo Yanyan		
2004	Spice Siblings	Ding Zhenzhu		
2004	The Ties that Bind (家财万贯)	Xu Minmin		
2005	Portrait of Home	Fu Baozhu		
2005	Portrait of Home II	Fu Baozhu		
2006	Family Matters	Guan Ji'er		
2006	House of Joy	Zheng Shuangxi		
2007	Kinship I	Zheng Jinsha		
2007	Kinship II	Zheng Jinsha		
2008	The Little Nyonya	Huang Xiujuan		
2008	Her Many Faces	Zheng Jiawen		
2009	My School Daze	Tao Guijuan		
2009	The Ultimatum	Chen Xiaobao		
2009	Daddy at Home	Chen Meihui		
2010	Happy Family	Jian Mei'e / Fatty Mei		
2010	The Best Things in Life	Chen Jiaxin		
2010	Precious Babes	Katie Ong		
2010	Mrs P.I.	Yun Feixue		
2011	The In-Laws	Yan Qiuhua		
2011	A Song to Remember	She-Sao		
2012	Show Hand (注定)	Wu Meifang		
2012	The Day It Rained on Our Parade	Lulu		
2013	96°C Cafe	Ann		
2013	Gonna Make It	Monica		
2014	Zero Calling	Julie		
2014	Mata Mata 2: A New Era	Nancy Ang		
2015	Life Is Beautiful	Fang Jie		
2015	Zero Calling 2	Julie		
2015	Crescendo	Wang Yafang		
2016	The Gentlemen	Zou Huimin		
2017	The Lead	Chen Qiulian		
2017	Life Less Ordinary	Zhang Ruoyun		
2018	A Lonely Fish (寂寞鱼·听见)	Ann		
2018	Say Cheese	Pan Zeguo		
2018	Magic Chef (料理人生)	Amy		
2018	Heart To Heart (心点心)	Li Peizhen		
2019	How Are You?	Pan Meiruo		
2019	Playground (游乐场)	Jen Lin Cuifen		
2019	Hello From The Other Side - Its Time (阴错阳差 — 时辰到)	Margaret		
2019	C.L.I.F. 5	Li Xiaoying		
2019	After The Stars (攻星计)	Zhen Mei		
2020	A Quest to Heal	Li Shaotong		
2020	How Are You? 2 (好世谋2)	Pan Meiruo		
2021	My Star Bride	Zhong Peipei		
2021	Mind Jumper (触心罪探)	Wiranto		
2021	The Peculiar Pawnbroker (人心鉴定师)	Ye Jingting		
2021	Leave No Soul Behind (21点灵)	Wu Yuwei		
2023	Fix My Life	Ma Lulu		
2023	Veil	Brenda		
2023	Oppa, Saranghae!	Lee Soo-jung		
2023	Shero	Gina Chee	Cameo	
2023	I Do, Do I?	Pan Anyu		
2024	Kill Sera Sera		Cameo	
2024	Hope Afloat	Li Zi Hui		
2025	I Believe I Can Fly			
2025	Decalcomania (ทวิญ) (折影双生)			

=== Film ===
Year	Title	Role	Notes	Ref.
1994	Love Dowry (爱情定金)	Wang Huiling	Telemovie	
1994	Romance in the Seventh Month	Qiu Qing	Telemovie	
1996	Legend of Da Bo Gong (大伯公传奇)	Chen Yuzhen / Lei Xiaochun	Telemovie	
2000	2000 A.D.	Theresa	Feature film	
2011	Already Famous	Herself	Cameo	
2022	My Star Bride - Hi, Mai Phương Thảo	Zhong Peipei	Telemovie	
2023	The Fourth Man (第四个男人)	Fang Liwen	Short film	
2023	Confinement	Ah Qing	Feature film	

== Theatre ==
Year	Title	Notes
1997	Men at Forty-Eight	

== Discography ==
=== Compilation albums ===
Year	Title	Ref
2012	MediaCorp Music Lunar New Year Album 12 (新传媒群星金龙接财神)	
2013	MediaCorp Music Lunar New Year Album 13 (新传媒群星金蛇献祥和)	
2016	MediaCorp Music Lunar New Year Album 16 (新传媒群星金猴添喜庆)	
2017	MediaCorp Music Lunar New Year Album 17 (新传媒群星咕鸡咕鸡庆丰年)	

== Awards and nominations ==
Organisation	Year	Category	Work	Result	Ref
Asian Television Awards	1999	Best Actress in a Leading Role	Stepping Out	Nominated	
Asian Academy Creative Awards	2019	Best Supporting Actress - National Winner (Singapore)	Say Cheese	Won	
Asian Academy Creative Awards	2021	Best Supporting Actress - National Winner (Singapore)	My Star Bride	Won	
Star Awards	1995	Top 10 Most Popular Female Artistes	—N/a	Nominated	
Star Awards	1996	Best Actress	Tofu Street	Nominated	
Star Awards	1996	Top 10 Most Popular Female Artistes	—N/a	Nominated	
Star Awards	1997	Top 10 Most Popular Female Artistes	—N/a	Won	
Star Awards	1998	Top 10 Most Popular Female Artistes	—N/a	Nominated	
Star Awards	1999	Best Actress	Stepping Out	Won	
Star Awards	1999	Top 10 Most Popular Female Artistes	—N/a	Nominated	
Star Awards	2000	Top 10 Most Popular Female Artistes	—N/a	Nominated	
Star Awards	2001	Top 10 Most Popular Female Artistes	—N/a	Nominated	
Star Awards	2002	Top 10 Most Popular Female Artistes	—N/a	Nominated	
Star Awards	2004	Top 10 Most Popular Female Artistes	—N/a	Nominated	
Star Awards	2005	Best Actress	Portrait of Home	Nominated	
Star Awards	2011	Best Supporting Actress	Happy Family	Nominated	
Star Awards	2011	Top 10 Most Popular Female Artistes	—N/a	Nominated	
Star Awards	2011	Favourite Onscreen Couple		Nominated	
Star Awards	2012	Top 10 Most Popular Female Artistes	—N/a	Won	
Star Awards	2013	Best Actress	Show Hand	Nominated	
Star Awards	2014	Perfect Curves Award	—N/a	Won	
Star Awards	2014	Most Popular Regional Artiste (Cambodia)		Nominated	
Star Awards	2015	Most Popular Regional Artiste (Cambodia)	—N/a	Nominated	
Star Awards	2019	Best Supporting Actress	Say Cheese	Nominated	
Star Awards	2019	Top 10 Most Popular Female Artistes	—N/a	Nominated	
Star Awards	2021	Best Supporting Actress	After the Stars	Nominated	
Star Awards	2022	Best Supporting Actress	My Star Bride	Nominated	
Star Awards	2022	Top 10 Most Popular Female Artistes	—N/a	Won	
Star Awards	2023	Best Supporting Actress	Leave No Soul Behind	Nominated	
Star Awards	2024	Top 10 Most Popular Female Artistes	—N/a	Nominated	
Star Awards	2025	Best Supporting Actress	Hope Afloat	Won	
Star Awards	2025	Top 10 Most Popular Female Artistes	—N/a	Nominated	
Star Awards	2026	Best Supporting Actress	I Believe I Can Fly	Nominated	
