= Jesseca Liu =

Malaysian actress and businesswoman (born 1979)

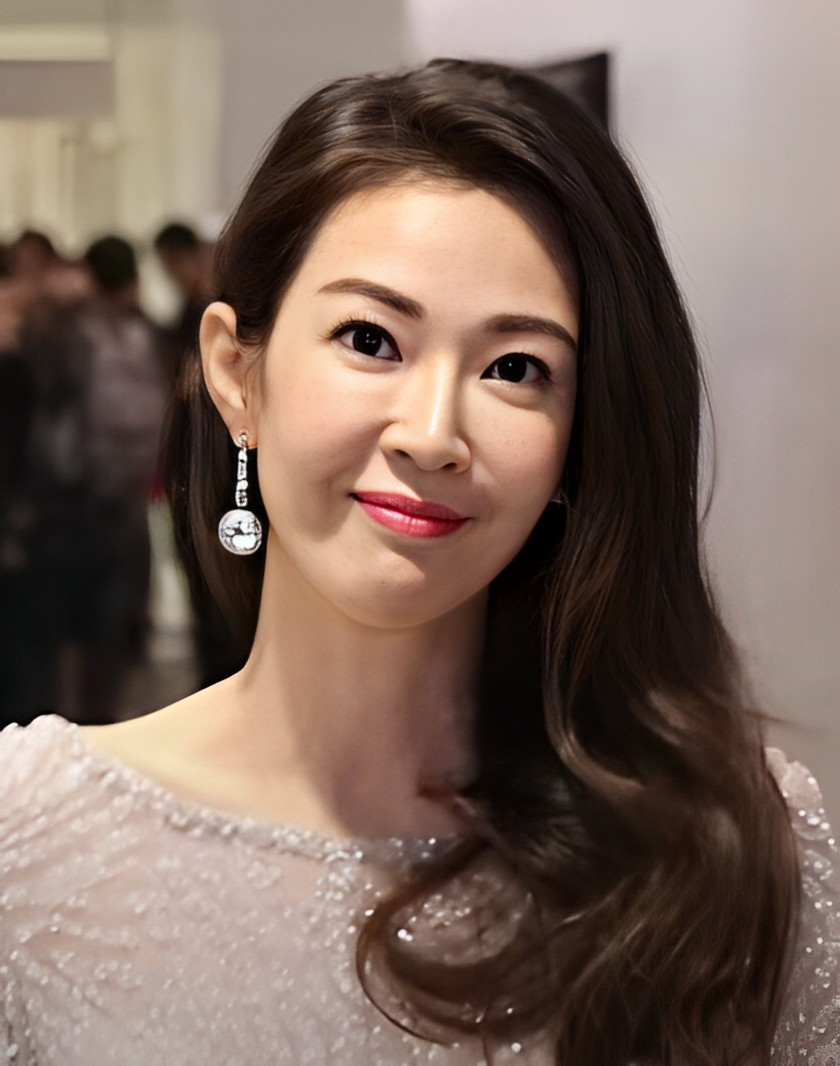
- Liu at the Star Awards 2017
- Born: Lao Chew Yen; 13 February 1979 (age 47); Langkawi, Kedah, Malaysia
- Education: Saito Academy
- Occupations: Actress; model; businesswoman
- Years active: 2004–present
- Agent: HIM International Music
- Spouse: Jeremy Chan (m. 2017)
- Awards: Full list

Stage name
- Traditional Chinese: 劉子絢
- Simplified Chinese: 刘子绚
- Hanyu Pinyin: Liú Zixuàn
- Jyutping: Lau4 Zi2 Hyun3
- Hokkien POJ: Lâu Chú-hiàn

Birth name
- Traditional Chinese: 劉秋雁
- Simplified Chinese: 刘秋雁
- Hanyu Pinyin: Liú Qiūyàn
- Jyutping: Lau4 Cau1 Ngaan6
- Hokkien POJ: Lâu Chhiu-gān

Jesseca Liu (born Lao Chew Yen on 13 February 1979) is a Malaysian actress who is based in Singapore. She is a contracted artiste under MediaCorp and managed by HIM International Music.

In 2026, Liu won her first Star Award for Best Actress for her critically acclaimed performance in Emerald Hill - The Little Nyonya Story, after previously being nominated in the same category six times.

== Early life ==
Jesseca Liu was born on 13 February 1979.

== Career ==
Liu snagged a role in the 100-episode drama series Portrait of Home in 2005. She played a Vietnamese bride Ruan Mianmian, and starred opposite veteran thespians Adrian Pang and Louise Lee. She was nominated for Best Supporting Actress and Most Popular Newcomer categories for the Star Awards 2005 ceremony with her role as Ruan Mianmian in Portrait of Home. She won the Most Popular Newcomer Award that year.

In 2006, Liu was named one of Mediacorp's Seven Princesses, a group of promising young actresses identified by the Singapore media as potential successors to the established Ah Jie stars. She subsequently became one of Singapore's leading actresses, winning the Star Awards for Top 10 Most Popular Female Artiste for four consecutive years from 2006 to 2010.

Liu's contract with MediaCorp expired in May 2010. She then went on to sign a contract with HIM International Music (Singapore) the same year, while managing her family's spa business.

In 2014, Liu wrote a script and it was made into a miniseries Who Killed The Lead? by Mediacorp. Liu would starred in the miniseries.

In 2015, Liu returned to Mediacorp, and she won her fifth Star Award for Top 10 Most Popular Female Artistes. In 2024, she was awarded the Star Award for All Time Favourite Artiste after winning the Top 10 Most Popular Female Artistes award ten times.

Her performance in the drama Emerald Hill – The Little Nyonya Story earned her the Best Actress in a Leading Role (National Winner) award at the 2025 Asian Academy Creative Awards and the Star Award for Best Actress in 2026.

== Personal life ==
Liu met Jeremy Chan through work. They married on 16 July 2017.

== Filmography ==
=== Film ===
Year	Title	Role	Notes	Ref.
2010	Lost and Found (小孩·狗)			
2015	Bring Back the Dead	Jia En		
2019	When Ghost Meets Zombie	Bai Bai		
2023	Circle Line	Yi Ling		

=== Television series ===
Year	Title	Role	Notes	Ref.
2004	Rumput Jiwa	Jesseca Liu		
2004	The Champion	He Yixuan		
2005	My Lucky Charm	Chen Xiuwen		
2005	Portrait of Home	Ruan Mian Mian		
2005	Portrait of Home II	Ruan Mian Mian		
2006	Yours Always	Wang Yingru		
2006	Women of Times	Jia Wanqi		
2006	Rhapsody in Blue	Ding Yirou		
2006	Through It All	Huang Qianyun		
2007	Mars vs Venus	Weng Ziling		
2007	Kinship I	Zheng Yusheng		
2007	Falling in Love	Zheng Zihui		
2008	Kinship II	Zheng Yusheng		
2008	Rhythm of Life	Liu Zhiling		
2008	Beach.Ball.Babes	Cai Yanfang		
2008	Crime Busters x 2	Ou Fenni		
2009	The Dream Catchers	Lin Jiale		
2009	Romantic Delicacies	Shen Xiaoxin		
2009	Baby Bonus	Zheng Xiaoyang		
2010	New Beginnings	Tang Wenxi		
2011	Secrets For Sale	Zhou Jiaqi		
2011	In Time with You	Huang Haiyan		
2011	The Oath	Yang Minfei		
2012	Yours Fatefully	Song Xinxin		
2012	Game Plan	Zhao Xingtong		
2013	Marry Me	Rainbow Ang		
2013	Disclosed	Kuang Yunxiang		
2014	Served H.O.T.	Li Xiaorong		
2014	Blessings	She Meiren		
2014	Blessings	Lin Xiaomei		
2014	Who Killed The Lead	Lin Huiru		
2014	Three Wishes		Guest appearance	
2015	Hand in Hand	Hong Meifang		
2015	Accidental Agents	Sammi		
2016	The Queen	Guan Xin		
2016	Hero	Zhang Weixiong		
2017	Eat Already? 2	Psychologist		
2018	Mind Matters	Qin Xiuxiu		
2018	Babies On Board	Pang Shiyun		
2019	Hello From The Other Side – It's Time	Meng Ru		
2019	The Driver	Ruan Su Xin		
2019	The Driver	Xu Zixin		
2020	Mind's Eye	He Sijia		
2020	Loving You	Lin Li		
2021	Crouching Tiger Hidden Ghost	Lin Xiaofang		
2021	The Take Down	Qiao Yi		
2022	Soul Detective	Liu Shuqin		
2022	Soul Detective	Soul Detective C		
2024	Kill Sera Sera	Exhibition Boss	Cameo	
2024	Once Upon a New Year's Eve (那一年的除夕夜)	Zhou Chenxi		
2024	Unforgivable	Gao Shu Ya		
2025	Emerald Hill - The Little Nyonya Story	Li Shu Qin		

== Discography ==
=== Compilation albums ===
Year	English title	Mandarin title
2017	MediaCorp Music Lunar New Year Album 17	新传媒群星咕鸡咕鸡庆丰年
2018	MediaCorp Music Lunar New Year Album 18	新传媒群星阿狗狗过好年

== Awards and nominations ==
Organisation	Year	Category	Nominated work	Result	Ref.
Asia Rainbow TV Awards	2019	Outstanding Leading Actress in Comedy	Hero	Won	
New York Festivals TV and Film Award	2020	Best Performance by an Actress	The Driver	Finalist	
Star Awards	2005	Best Supporting Actress	Portrait of Home	Nominated	
Star Awards	2005	Best Newcomer	Portrait of Home	Won	
Star Awards	2006	Best Actress	Rhapsody in Blue	Nominated	
Star Awards	2006	Top 10 Most Popular Female Artistes	—N/a	Won	
Star Awards	2007	Best Actress	Kinship	Nominated	
Star Awards	2007	Top 10 Most Popular Female Artistes	—N/a	Won	
Star Awards	2009	Top 10 Most Popular Female Artistes	—N/a	Won	
Star Awards	2010	Favourite Female Character	The Dream Catchers	Nominated	
Star Awards	2010	Top 10 Most Popular Female Artistes	—N/a	Won	
Star Awards	2012	Favourite Female Character	The Oath	Nominated	
Star Awards	2012	Favourite Onscreen Couple	The Oath	Nominated	
Star Awards	2013	Favourite Onscreen Couple	Game Plan	Nominated	
Star Awards	2016	Top 10 Most Popular Female Artistes	—N/a	Won	
Star Awards	2017	Best Actress	Hero	Nominated	
Star Awards	2017	Top 10 Most Popular Female Artistes	—N/a	Won	
Star Awards	2019	Top 10 Most Popular Female Artistes	—N/a	Won	
Star Awards	2021	Top 10 Most Popular Female Artistes	—N/a	Won	
Star Awards	2022	Best Actress	Crouching Tiger Hidden Ghost	Nominated	
Star Awards	2022	Favourite Female Show Stealer	Crouching Tiger Hidden Ghost	Nominated	
Star Awards	2022	Favourite CP	Crouching Tiger Hidden Ghost	Nominated	
Star Awards	2022	Top 10 Most Popular Female Artistes	—N/a	Won	
Star Awards	2023	Best Actress	Soul Detective	Nominated	
Star Awards	2023	Favourite Female Show Stealer	Soul Detective	Won	
Star Awards	2023	Top 10 Most Popular Female Artistes	—N/a	Won	
Star Awards	2024	All-Time Favourite Artiste	—N/a	Won	
Star Awards	2025	Best Actress	Unforgivable	Nominated	
Star Awards	2025	The Show Stealer	Unforgivable	Won	
Star Awards	2026	Best Actress	Emerald Hill - The Little Nyonya Story	Won	
Star Awards	2026	Most Emotional Performance	Emerald Hill - The Little Nyonya Story	Won	
Star Awards	2026	The Show Stealer	Emerald Hill - The Little Nyonya Story	Nominated	
Star Awards	2026	Favourite CP	Emerald Hill - The Little Nyonya Story	Nominated	
