= Portrait of Home =

Singaporean TV series

- 同心圆
- Genre: Modern Drama
- Created by: Ng Kah Huay (黄佳华)
- Written by: Lim Gim Lan (林锦兰); Phang Kai Yee (彭凯毅)
- Directed by: Loo Yin Kam (卢燕金); Tay Peck Choo (郑碧珠); Loh Woon Woon (罗温温)
- Starring: Louise Lee; Xiang Yun; Adrian Pang; Pierre Png; Felicia Chin
- Opening theme: Portrait Of Home 同心圆 by 乐声, 吴辛荣, 王敏惠, 蔡美仪
- Ending theme: 1) Topic 话题 by 乐生 & 王敏惠; 2) Man's Heart 男人心 by 吴幸荣
- Country of origin: Singapore
- Original language: Chinese
- No. of episodes: Part 1: 60; Part 2: 40

Production
- Producer: Li Ningqiang (李宁强)
- Running time: approx. 45 minutes

Original release
- Network: MediaCorp Channel 8
- Release: 2005

Related
- Holland V Double Happiness; Double Happiness II; Love Blossoms; Love Blossoms II; 118; 118 II; 118 Reunion

Portrait of Home (Chinese: 同心圆) is a Chinese language drama serial which was filmed for and broadcast on Singapore's Mediacorp TV Channel 8 in 2005. It stars Louise Lee, Xiang Yun, Adrian Pang, Pierre Png and Felicia Chin as the casts of the series. It is shown on weekdays at 7pm.

The show has 100 episodes telecast in two segments, the first part with 60 episodes and the second part with 40 episodes.

== Plot ==
Tong Xin Yuan is a successful fishball factory with thriving sales both locally in Singapore and in neighbouring countries. However, beneath its success lies a dark mystery.

Many years ago, Li Tian (Louise Lee), a beautiful factory worker, married Zhou Dong (Chen Shucheng), the founder of Tong Xin Yuan. The couple had three sons: Zhou Dadi (Adrian Pang), Zhou Dashan (Yao Wenlong) and Zhou Daqiu (Cavin Soh). However, tragedy struck when Zhou Dong disappeared after a failed kidnap attempt, leaving behind no trace of his body.

In his absence, a loyal factory worker, Lin Shitou (Richard Low), stepped up to run the business. Three years later, he married Li Tian, and they had another three sons: Lin Dahai (Terence Cao), Lin Dayang (Pierre Png) and Lin Dajiang (Zhang Yaodong). Rumours soon spread that Shitou had killed Zhou Dong to seize both the factory and Li Tian.

Despite the speculation, Tong Xin Yuan flourished under the couple’s management, and Li Tian ensured that all six sons were treated equally. To keep the family close, she built a seven-unit apartment block, reserving six units for her sons. They could only move in after marriage; otherwise, they would forfeit their unit. She also set a strict rule that the family must gather for a meal once a week, no matter how busy they were.

The six half-brothers, each with distinct personalities, often clashed. Though they all worked at the fishball factory, Dahai pursued scriptwriting, and Dajiang remained in university.

Among them, Dadi was the most eccentric and remained single. Secretly, he loved Zhang Xiu Hua (Xiang Yun), a factory worker who later became the supervisor, manager, and CEO of Tong Xin Yuan. Xiu Hua is also their housekeeper. Unaware of his feelings, Li Tian and Xiu Hua arranged a Vietnamese bride, Ruan Mianmian (Jesseca Liu), for him, leaving him in an awkward situation.

Dashan, haunted by a tragic past, fell into despair after witnessing his girlfriend’s death and turned to drugs. After leaving rehabilitation, he encountered Su Haitang (Le Yao), a cunning woman from Shanghai who bore a striking resemblance to his late girlfriend. Nearly ensnared by her schemes, he was saved by the kind-hearted Yang Qin (Ta Na), also from Shanghai, who later became his new girlfriend in Season 2. However, his emotional nature often hindered his ability to achieve greater things.

Daqiu, the schemer, married the equally shrewd Fu Baozhu (Cynthia Koh). Constantly plotting to take over Tong Xin Yuan, he failed at every attempt. In contrast, his honest brother, Dayang, married Baozhu’s sincere younger sister, Fu Baobei (Felicia Chin). Despite Daqiu and Baozhu’s continuous efforts to undermine them, the couple persevered and found success through hard work.

Dahai, the scriptwriter, defied his mother’s wishes by marrying a wealthy woman, Gao Jimei (Apple Hong), and moving into her home. Through her, he met Fyn Tan (Yvonne Lim), who had her own agenda of revenge, bringing unnecessary danger into their lives.

Dajiang, the youngest, remained in university and changed girlfriends frequently, always seeking novelty. He had no great ambitions but enjoyed experiencing new things.

Daqiu, ambitious and power-hungry, sought to take over both Tong Xin Yuan and the Zhou family estate. He aimed to forcefully remove Shitou, Xiu Hua, and his five brothers, seize his mother Li Tian’s assets, and steal his brothers’ shares in the company.

However, the family was thrown into turmoil when Zhou Dong—presumed dead—reappeared. Shockingly, the man claiming to be Zhou Dong was actually Zhang Guangyang, another devious schemer. The truth finally emerged: the real Zhou Dong had been dead all along.

As family tensions reached a climax, long-held secrets unravelled, and loyalty, greed, and ambition clashed in a battle over the fate of Tong Xin Yuan.

== Cast ==
- Louise Lee as Li Tian (李甜), the wife of Zhou Dong who subsequently remarried to Lin Shitou.
- Richard Low as Lin Shitou (林石头), the second husband of Li Tian. He is killed by Zhou Daqiu at the final episode of Season 1 and passes away in Season 2 due to head injury which left him in a coma state.
- Chen Shucheng as Zhou Dong (周东) and Zhang Guangyang (张光杨), Zhou is the first husband of Li Tian and also the owner of Tong Xin Yuan who disappeared after a kidnap attempt went wrong, and turns out that Zhang Guangyang has been impersonating him all these time during the kidnapping, and in fact he was very sick and later passes away, and in fact he is not as evil and terrible unlike his good friend Zhang Guangyang. Zhang is a good friend of Zhou and impersonates as him as he looks like Zhou. The latter being Zhang Guangyang is also the Main Villain of Season 2, who lived in Zhou Jia Yuan after Lin Shitou passes away and kept asking both the Zhou and Lin family for money and also killed his own wife named Jiang Ling whilst at home when she wanted to expose the truth that her own husband is indeed a faked Zhou Dong and wanted the photo of both Zhou Dong and Zhang Guangyang back before killing her. Afterwards, the police officers came and wanted to arrest Zhang Guangyang for impersonating as Zhou Dong and also killing his own wife Jiang Ling and framing Li Tian for the murder, and then moves out of Zhou Jia Yuan and escapes in which he returned back later to kidnap Li Tian, Ruan Mianmian, Fu Baozhu and Amina and finally revealed his plan to demand and extort S$2 million from Zhou and Lin family before being stopped by Zhou Dadi, Zhou Daqiu, Lin Dayang and Lin Dajiang.
- Xiang Yun as Zhang Xiuhua (张绣花), a worker and later, Supervisor, Manager and CEO of Tong Xin Yuan. She is also the housekeeper of Zhou Jia Yuan who looks after Li Tian, Lin Shitou and all the 6 brothers whilst at home.
- Adrian Pang as Zhou Dadi 周大地
- Yao Wenlong as Zhou Dashan 周大山
- Cavin Soh as Zhou Daqiu 周大丘 (Main Villain of the series for both installments)
- Terence Cao as Lin Dahai 林大海
- Pierre Png as Lin Dayang 林大洋
- Zhang Yaodong as Lin Dajiang 林大江

=== Season 1 ===
Actor	Character(s)	Description	Ref
Cynthia Koh	Fu Baozhu 傅宝珠	Semi-Villain; Zhou Daqiu's Wife; Fu Baobei's adoptive sister	
Felicia Chin	Fu Baobei 傅宝贝	Mermaid 美人鱼; Fu Baozhu's adoptive sister Lin Dayang's Love Interest and Later Wife	
Jesseca Liu	Ruan Mianmian 阮棉棉	Zhou Dadi's Wife	
Apple Hong	Gao Jimei 高级美	Sister Maria; Lin Dahai's Wife	
Yvonne Lim	Chen Fenling (Fyn) 陈芬玲	Supporting Villain; Lin Dahai's Love Interest	
Alan Tern	Chen Shaodong 陈少东	Supporting Villain; Fu Baobei's Love Interest; Lin Dayang's Enemy and Rival In Love	
Zhang Xinxiang	Li Fa 李发	Manager of Tong Xin Yuan; Li Tian's younger brother Zhou Dadi, Zhou Dashan, Zhou Daqiu, Lin Dahai, Lin Dayang and Lin Dajiang's Uncle; Li Xinmin's Father; Zhang Xiu Hua's Love Interest	
Liu Lingling		Fu Baozhu's Mother; Fu Baobei's adoptive Mother; Gambler	
Le Yao 乐瑶	Su Haitang 苏海棠	Zhou Dashan's Girlfriend from Shanghai, China	
Joavan Brandan Bosco Pereira	Kumar	Lin Dayang's Friend who could speak Mandarin, English and Tamil	

=== Season 2 ===
Actor	Character(s)	Description
Priscelia Chan	Li Xinmin 李心敏	Li Fa's daughter Li Tian's niece Zhou Dadi, Zhou Dashan, Zhou Daqiu, Lin Dahai, Lin Dayang and Lin Dajiang's cousin Zhou Daqiu's Former Secretary and Assistant at Tong Xin Yuan and Number 1 Target Enemy after she betrayed him and actually did the correct thing by taking back Tong Xin Yuan from Zhou Daqiu after the latter cheated and took all of her aunt Li Tian's assets and also all of her 5 other cousin's stakes in both Tong Xin Yuan and Zhou Jia Yuan before she moves on with her new life overseas and starting all over again, because she was studying in university in Australia in Season 1 and was raped by the Australian rapist and her ex-boyfriend Dave did not manage to save her and then ran away and betrayed her instead, which explains why she treated Zhou Daqiu like both the Australian rapist and ex-boyfriend Dave; Betrayed Zhou Daqiu eventually because of stopping him from his evil plans along with Bryan and the Zhou and Lin family
Wang Yuqing	Parry	Ruan Mianmian's friend and Love Interest; Likes Ruan Mianmian
Li Yinzhu	Jiang Ling	Supporting Villain; Zhang Guangyang's Wife; Killed by her own husband Zhang Guangyang; Li Tian, Zhang Xiuhua, Li Fa, Zhou Dadi, Zhou Dashan, Lin Dayang, Fu Baobei, Zhou Daqiu and Fu Baozhu's Enemy
Brandon Wong	Bryan	Snoopy and Li Xinmin's Lawyer who assisted mainly the latter in getting Tong Xin Yuan back from Zhou Daqiu after the latter cheated and took all of Li Tian's assets and also all of his 5 other brother's stakes in both Tong Xin Yuan and Zhou Jia Yuan; Zhou Daqiu's Former Good Friend and Business Partner who betrayed him eventually because of stopping Zhou Daqiu from his evil plans along with Xinmin and the Zhou and Lin family Snoopy's former Lawyer whom possibly got betrayed because he also had enough of Snoopy and is also aware of his evil doings and crimes as a Crime Boss, Loan Shark and Drug Lord instead of a Legitimate Businessman
Ta Na 塔娜	Yang Qin 杨芹	Fu Baobei's Good Friend and Zhou Dashan's New Girlfriend from Shanghai, China after Su Haitang passes away after being tortured and killed by Snoopy; Snoopy's former girlfriend and enemies currently
Ace Wang Yanbin 王艳宾	Snoopy 史诺比	Supporting Villain; Legitimate Businessman, Crime Boss, Loan Shark and Drug Lord from Shanghai, China; Zhou Dashan, Su Haitang and Yang Qin's Enemy; Bryan's Former Lawyer and Good Friend who possibly became enemies in the end because of betraying him and thinking that he is no longer useful to him Zhou Daqiu's Former Good Friend and Business Partner who betrayed him and then scammed and cheated all of his money away for his own lavish personal expenditures
Romeo Tan	Joe	Fu Baobei's friend

== Music ==
Song title	Performer	Type of Song
Portrait Of Home 同心圆	乐声, 吴幸荣, 王敏惠, 察美仪	Theme Song
Topic 话题	乐生 & 王敏惠	Sub Theme Song
Man's Heart 男人心	吴幸荣	Sub Theme Song

== Awards and nominations ==
Year	Ceremony	Award	Nominees	Result	Ref
2005	Star Awards	Young Talent Award	Joavan Brandan Bosco Pereira	Nominated	
2005	Star Awards	Best Actor	Adrian Pang	Nominated	
2005	Star Awards	Best Actress	Cynthia Koh	Nominated	
2005	Star Awards	Best Supporting Actor	Cavin Soh	Won	
2005	Star Awards	Best Supporting Actress	Jesseca Liu	Nominated	
2005	Star Awards	Best Supporting Actress	Yvonne Lim	Won	
2005	Star Awards	Best Drama Serial	—N/a	Nominated	
2006	Star Awards	Best Actor	Adrian Pang	Nominated	
2006	Asian Television Awards	Best Drama Performance by an Actor	Adrian Pang	Nominated	
2007	Star Awards 2007	Top 10 Most Memorable Villains 十大恶人	Yvonne Lim	Top 10	
2007	Star Awards 2007	Top 10 Most Memorable Villains 十大恶人	Cavin Soh	Top 10	
