= List of Kinship episodes =

This is the list of the Singaporean drama Kinship's episodes. Copyright to MediaCorp TV Channel 8.

== Episode list ==
=== Part 1: June — August ===
No. overall	No. in season	Title	Original release date
1	1	"Episode 1"	June 19, 2007
Chen Anping and Chen Anxin run a foot reflexology chain. Anping and Meiqi have three fostered daughters: Jinsha, Yinsha and Yusheng; Anxin and Meixue have one son: Yingjun. Yingjun gets Yusheng to pose as his girlfriend.
2	2	"Episode 2"	June 20, 2007
Meixue objects to Yingjun dating Yusheng, as Yusheng’s biological mother was a convict who was hung for drug dealing. Yingjun has a girlfriend, Shuiling, when he was overseas. They fell out because of his return.
3	3	"Episode 3"	June 21, 2007
Yingjun is reunited with Shuiling and decides to marry her. Shuiling confronts Yusheng when told that Yingjun is 'dating' the latter. Yusheng and Shuiling were ex-classmates. Shuiling tries to sever ties with her debt-ridden father.
4	4	"Episode 4"	June 22, 2007
Anxin meets Shuiling by chance a few times and is mesmerized by her beauty. Meiqi is worried that Yusheng, a prison warden, will meet her biological grandmother, who is serving a life sentence after taking the rap for her son.
5	5	"Episode 5"	June 25, 2007
Shuiling goes all out to stop Yusheng from getting near Yingjun. Though Martin knows that Shuiling is Yingjun’s girlfriend, he hopes to use Shuiling to get into Anxin’s good books. Anxin throws Naifa out after using him to poach staff.
6	6	"Episode 6"	June 26, 2007
Shuiling used to work as a lounge hostess to earn money for her studies. Martin uses that to blackmail her into serving Anxin and is peeved when Shuiling chooses to tell Yingjun the truth about her background.
7	7	"Episode 7"	June 27, 2007
Yusheng’s father, Chang Ying, is back. He kidnaps Anxin and extorts money from the latter. Anxin gives in, as he had swindled Chang Ying of his money years ago. Anping learns about it and is worried that Yusheng’s parentage will be exposed.
8	8	"Episode 8"	June 28, 2007
Shuiling’s father gets involved in an assault case with Frankie, who turns out to be Anxin’s friend. Martin tells Shuiling that Anxin will help her father if she sleeps with him. Yinsha’s mother-in-law moves in and is upset to see her son being henpecked.
9	9	"Episode 9"	June 29, 2007
Anxin lashes out at Martin for causing Shuiling to have a wrong impression of him. Zhaoyang is troubled when his mother keeps quarrelling with Yinsha. Yusheng ends up in Yingjun’s arms after taking some chocolate, which she is sensitive to.
10	10	"Episode 10"	July 2, 2007
Xiaobin extorts an MP4 player from Yusheng after showing the latter the photograph he took of her and Yingjun. Shuiling gets hold of the photograph and pastes copies of it all over the neighbourhood.
11	11	"Episode 11"	July 3, 2007
Yingjun leaves home when Anxin and Meixue object to his marrying Shuiling. He moves in with Anping and Meiqi. To reap a pile, Yinsha and Naifa agree to help Anping and Meixue break Yingjun and Shuiling up.
12	12	"Episode 12"	July 4, 2007
Naifa dupes Yusheng into drinking a cup of chocolate. He then gets Yinsha to undress Yusheng and put her in the bathtub. Yingjun tries to save the drowsy Yusheng and unwittingly lets Meiqi and Anping see him and Yusheng together in the bathroom.
13	13	"Episode 13"	July 5, 2007
Shuiling runs off and moves into Anxin’s condominium. On the day of the wedding registration, she is about to set off to meet Yingjun when Martin tells her the relationship between Anxin and Yingjun.
14	14	"Episode 14"	July 6, 2007
Yingjun and Yusheng learn that it was Anxin and Meixue who instigated Naifa and Yinsha to break Yingjun and Shuiling up. Jinsha is scolded for exposing the truth. She vents her frustrations at the coffeeshop and ends up in the police station.
15	15	"Episode 15"	July 9, 2007
Yusheng is drawn closer to Yingjun after she tries all means to help him locate Shuiling. Duoduo and the others mistakenly think Wind is gay. Shuiling wants Anxin to divorce his wife, so that she can marry him.
16	16	"Episode 16"	July 10, 2007
Anxin decides to divorce Meixue. Though devastated, Meixue accepts her fate, but wants Anxin to let Yingjun have at least 30% of the company’s shares. Jinsha catches her son taking photographs of girls’ underwear with his mobile phone.
17	17	"Episode 17"	July 11, 2007
Yingjun is upset upon realizing that the woman Anxin wants to marry is Shuiling. He refuses to believe that Shuiling had chosen Anxin for his money. Trouble brews when Yingjun and Yusheng move in with Anxin.
18	18	"Episode 18"	July 12, 2007
Shuiling bribes Yinsha to make Yingjun believe that Yusheng set up the bathroom incident to break him and Shuiling up. Shuiling regrets giving Yingjun up upon learning that he holds 30% of the company’s shares.
19	19	"Episode 19"	July 13, 2007
Yingjun finally sees Shuiling’s true colours and falls out with her. Wind is upset after getting scolded at work. He vents his frustrations by the beach with Yusheng and decides to date her.
20	20	"Episode 20"	July 16, 2007
Jinsha causes her son to be caned in school for a crime he did not commit. Yingjun does not believe that Yusheng is really dating Wind. Meixue loses focus in her life and develops bulimia.
21	21	"Episode 21"	July 17, 2007
Meixue insists on moving back to her matrimonial home. Anping, the only person who knows about her bulimia problem, tries hard to help her, giving Martin an opportunity to accuse Anping and Meixue of adultery.
22	22	"Episode 22"	July 18, 2007
While Meiqi and Meixue are fighting over the alleged affair between Meixue and Anping, Shuiling gives them a push, causing Meixue to end up in hospital. She then urges Anxin to divorce Meixue on the grounds of adultery.
23	23	"Episode 23"	July 19, 2007
When Yingjun threatens to tell Anxin what Shuiling had done to him in the past, Shuiling turns the tables round and accuses Yingjun of forcing himself on her. Yusheng takes the homeless and jobless Yingjun in and vows to help him.
24	24	"Episode 24"	July 20, 2007
When Yusheng and Wind attend a gathering at her house, she sees Yingjun and her colleague and best friend, talking and sharing jokes between them. She is sad that Yingjun gets along well with Wenya.
25	25	"Episode 25"	July 23, 2007
Shuiling causes Yingjun to be chased out of the house. He also gets fired from Da Ying Jia. Wind gets a job at a hair salon and wins the popularity of a few customers. The kindhearted but gullible Zhaoyang gets conned out of a huge sum of money.
26	26	"Episode 26"	July 24, 2007
Meiqi is angry with Anxin and has him kidnapped to teach him a lesson. He sees Shuiling's true colours but lets her stay after a doctor confirmed that she was pregnant with Anxin's child.
27	27	"Episode 27"	July 25, 2007
Yusheng breaks up with Wind and is upset to see Yingjun and Wenya get closer by the day. Yinsha is jealous of Meiqi’s concern for Jinsha. She makes everyone believe she is suffering from depression.
28	28	"Episode 28"	July 26, 2007
Wenya cannot fathom why Meiqi, Jinsha and Yingjun treat Shuiling so shabbily. Yinsha goes all out to make Anping give her half of Jinsha's shop. She succeeds with much difficulty, making Naifa upset.
29	29	"Episode 29"	July 27, 2007
After seeing how kind Wind is, Anping picks him to be his successor. Naifa is unhappy and contemplates setting up his own business. Anxin is happy that Shuiling is carrying a son.
30	30	"Episode 30"	July 30, 2007
Meiqi makes Yusheng and Yingjun realize that they love each other. However, neither is willing to admit it. Wind will only agree to become Anping’s successor if Anping convinces Yusheng to date him once again. Yingjun gets injured after protecting Anxin from a falling box.
31	31	"Episode 31"	July 31, 2007
Meixue tells Meiqi that Yingjun was fathered by Li Dawei, her ex-boyfriend who dumped her. Anxin has no idea that Yingjun is not his son. Yusheng and Yingjun fail to get an opportunity to make their feelings known to each other.
32	32	"Episode 32"	August 1, 2007
Sleazy massage joints offering extra services pop out in the neighbourhood. Meiqi spots Naifa coming out of one of the shops and warns Jinsha about it. Naifa cons Jinsha into believing there is nothing going on between him and Daixi.
33	33	"Episode 33"	August 2, 2007
Wind completes his training and officially becomes Anping's disciple. Yusheng calls the police after verifying that Chang Ying’s massage parlour offers extra services. Chang Ying is so angry that he kidnaps Yusheng.
34	34	"Episode 34"	August 3, 2007
Yingjun sees Chang Ying’s lover, Youmei, wearing Yusheng’s necklace and decides to trail her. He ends up being captured by Chang Ying as well. Meiqi is upset with Chang Ying for kidnapping his own daughter, Yusheng.
35	35	"Episode 35"	August 6, 2007
Anping and Anxin give Chang Ying the money he asked for. To protect himself, Chang Ying gets his men to take nude photographs of Yusheng and Yingjun. Wenya senses that Yingjun loves Yusheng, not her.
36	36	"Episode 36"	August 7, 2007
Youmei asks the Chens for money in exchange for the nude photographs. Shuiling urges Martin to seduce Youmei and get hold of the photographs. Chang Ying discovers that Yusheng is his daughter.
37	37	"Episode 37"	August 8, 2007
Yusheng is devastated to learn that her nude photographs are circulating in the press and Internet. Shuiling even gets Martin to tip-off the press, so that the reporters will harass Yusheng.
38	38	"Episode 38"	August 10, 2007
Yusheng cannot accept the fact that Chang Ying is her father. She would rather die than acknowledge him. Yingjun holds a press conference to clarify the nude photographs incident. Shuiling is green with envy.
39	39	"Episode 39"	August 13, 2007
Shuiling has an early delivery after a tiff with Meixue. She is pleased when Anxin transfers 20% of the company's shares to their son, Chen Yingxiong. Anxin finally learns that Shuiling was Yingjun's girlfriend.
40	40	"Episode 40"	August 14, 2007
Anping's fellow disciple, Lishi, turns up at the shop and claims that she was pregnant with Anping's child after they spent a night together in Taiwan. She instigates Xiaobin to lodge an abuse report against Jinsha.
41	41	"Episode 41"	August 15, 2007
Yinsha gets into trouble when the slimming pills she sold cause side effects. Yusheng gets embroiled in a murder case. She is overwhelmed when Chang Ying offers to take the rap for her, despite knowing that he might be sentenced to death.
42	42	"Episode 42"	August 16, 2007
Anxin suspects that Shuiling is in cahoots with Martin, but he has no evidence to prove it. Lishi tells Anping that she will get all his three daughters out of trouble if Anping agrees to leave for good with her.
43	43	"Episode 43 (Finale)"	August 17, 2007
Yingjun and Wind manage to find an eyewitness to save Yusheng, but Lishi bribes the witness to skip town. Martin and Shuiling throw Chang Ying and Anxin into the sea after their collaboration is exposed.

=== Part 2 ===
No. overall	No. in season	Title	Original release date
44	1	"Episode 1"	December 17, 2007
Meiqi, Jinsha and Yinsha are devastated when Yusheng is sentenced to death for murdering Spy. Yusheng is unable to accept the sentence and refuses to see Yingjun. Daisy inherits her entire family’s fortune and financially supports Naifa. He has other plans however when she refuses to fork out money to open another massage parlour.
45	2	"Episode 2"	December 18, 2007
To save Yusheng, Anping attempts suicide by drinking detergent to lure Lishi out. Lishi gives false information to Anping, causing Yingjun to be severely beaten up. Lishi demands Anping divorce Meiqi before she tells the truth. Everyone is shocked when Anping announces his decision to divorce Meiqi.
46	3	"Episode 3"	December 19, 2007
Anping and Meiqi sign the divorce papers. Yusheng agrees to marry Yingjun and they hold a simple wedding in prison. Upon Martin’s idea, Shuiling takes over Da Ying Jia and suggests to Yingjun that they co-manage the business together but he refuses her offer.
47	4	"Episode 4"	December 20, 2007
Anping steals evidence from Lishi to save Yusheng. She is acquitted of the murder charge and is released from prison. Yusheng discovers Anping and Meiqi are divorced and decides to return to Yingjun’s home only after reconciling them. Yingjun decides to give Yusheng a perfect wedding. Just when Meiqi is troubled over the declining business at Da Ying Jia, Shui Ling demands her share of the shop.
48	5	"Episode 5"	December 21, 2007
Meiqi refuses to sell half of the shop’s shares to Shuiling. The latter sows discord between Naifa and Wind, causing Naifa to force Wind to resign and leave Da Ying Jia. Yusheng visits her grandmother for the first time and finds out Chang Ying forced her grandmother and her mother to take the rap for his drug-trafficking crimes. Her grandmother speaks up for Chang Ying.
49	6	"Episode 6"	December 24, 2007
Zhaoyang kneels in front of all the victims’ families and begs for forgiveness on behalf of Yinsha. The families agree to settle the matter out-of-court but ask for $500,000 compensation. Yinsha is moved when Zhaoyang is willing to sell their home to raise the sum. Zhaoyang’s mother scolds Yinsha for dragging him down and causing her to be homeless. Meiqi meets up with Anping and lets him now of her decision to sell the shop to help Yinsha. Anping has no objections.
50	7	"Episode 7"	December 25, 2007
Meiqi informs Shuiling of her decision to sell the shop but Shuiling insists that Meiqi sell it to her. Yinsha and Naifa negotiate with Shuiling to agree to the sale. Yusheng finds a job as a private investigator and trails Anping to find out the truth behind his departure. Meiqi sells the shop to help Yinsha and is shocked to find out the buyer is Lishi.
51	8	"Episode 8"	December 26, 2007
Yusheng suspects Shuiling is aware that Lishi is the buyer but Shuiling feigns ignorance. Meiqi is shocked to discover Lishi pregnant with Anping’s child. Yusheng berates Anping for impregnating Lishi and causing Meiqi more hurt. Anping finally reveals his reason for divorcing Meiqi; Yusheng is moved when she learns that Anping is only together with Lishi in order to save her.
52	9	"Episode 9"	December 27, 2007
Yusheng urges Anping to attend her wedding. Before he leaves home, Yingjun tells Meixue that he is marrying Yusheng that day. Meixue has an odd reaction but Yingjun is oblivious to it. After the wedding, the newlyweds discover a group of journalists outside their home. It turns out that a tabloid magazine has published news of Ying Jun marrying an ex-drug trafficker’s daughter.
53	10	"Episode 10"	December 28, 2007
The journalists hound Yusheng on her background. Everyone is surprised when Shuiling steps in to request for the journalists to leave. Anping starves himself to force Lishi to give half of the shop to Meiqi. Lishi has no choice but to agree. Lishi asks Meiqi to manage half of the shop and the latter only agrees after Anping and Yusheng stages an act.
54	11	"Episode 11"	December 31, 2007
Yusheng and Yingjun begin their blissful life as husband and wife. Envious of the couple’s impending honeymoon, Shuiling picks on Yingjun and puts him in charge of a big project on purpose. Yingjun works on the proposal day and night, hoping he can complete it on time before he leaves for his honeymoon. Everyone suspects Meiqi of having a new romance when she has an image makeover.
55	12	"Episode 12"	January 1, 2008
A man tries to chat Shuiling up in a bar. Yusheng chases the man away and helps the drunken Shuiling home. Yusheng sympathises with Shuiling when the latter reveals her longing for Anxin. Lishi and Meiqi fight head-on when the massage parlour re-opens.
56	13	"Episode 13"	January 2, 2008
Zhongshang invites Meiqi and Jinsha to a concert and treats them to an extravagant meal. Meiqi is unaware of Zhong Shang’s feelings towards her and instead deduces that he likes Jinsha. However, Zhongshan notices Meiqi is still concerned about Anping.
57	14	"Episode 14"	January 3, 2008
Shuiling believes she has seen Anxin and chases after him. She is startled when she sees the disfigured Thai monk Ha Sa Yan and hurries away, without realizing Master Ha Sa Yan is indeed Anxin. Anxin recollects how he was left for dead in the sea before being rescued. Shuiling suspects Anxin may still be alive but Martin reassures her that he could not have lived.
58	15	"Episode 15"	January 4, 2008
Anping disappears, hoping his disappearance will reconcile Meiqi and Lishi. Anping puts up temporarily at a Thai temple and meets Master Ha Sa Yan. Anping finds Master Ha Sa Yan familiar but he can’t recollect where he has seen him before. Thinking Zhongshang likes her, Jinsha begins to pick up her confidence but her words hurt the sensitive Yinsha. Yinsha loses her temper.
59	16	"Episode 16"	January 7, 2008
Meiqi and Zhongshang pretend to date to lure Anping out. Yusheng asks Anping to stop Zhongshang from wooing Meiqi but Anping appears nonchalant. Yusheng and Yingjun bump into Ha Sa Yan in a Thai temple but they did not recognize him. The guilt-ridden Shuiling hallucinates about Meixue waking up.
60	17	"Episode 17"	January 8, 2008
Suspecting Naifa of having an extramarital affair, Jinsha confides in Meiqi and Yusheng who ask her to investigate further. Martin plans to poison Meixue. Yusheng and Yingjun urge the sick Anping to return home but he refuses to. Yusheng disagrees with Yingjun when he suspects Ha Sa Yan is Anxin.
61	18	"Episode 18"	January 9, 2008
For the sake of his career, Naifa decides to divorce Jinsha upon Daisy’s request. He picks on Jinsha on purpose and asks for a divorce. Jinsha discovers Naifa and Daisy’s affair and beats them up. Daisy dumps Naifa who then returns to Jinsha and resumes working in Da Ying Jia.
62	19	"Episode 19"	January 10, 2008
Meiqi announces she has found a job and hands the massage parlour to Anping and Lishi. Lishi is dejected when she realizes Meiqi is no longer competing with her. Ha Sa Yan suspects Shuiling of meddling with Meixue’s medicine and secretly takes it away during his prayers. Shuiling gets her way at the director’s meeting, leaving Yingjun furious.
63	20	"Episode 20"	January 11, 2008
Yusheng feels wronged when Yingjun quarrels with her for neglecting him. Yusheng’s new colleague, Zixin, bears an uncanny resemblance to Chang Ying. Yusheng insists Zixin is Chang Ying and wants to report him to the police. Shuiling fires Martin and asks him to set up his own company.
64	21	"Episode 21"	January 14, 2008
Shui Ling feels uneasy when Mei Xue regains consciousness and attempts to poison Mei Xue by spiking her medicine. Ha Sa Yan overturns the poisoned medicine and advises Shui Ling to stop her evil acts. Shui Ling is convinced that Ying Xiong is being punished for her misdeeds when he has a relapse and thus apologises to Mei Xue.
65	22	"Episode 22"	January 15, 2008
An Ping secretly returns to Mei Qi's home but has to hide when he sees Mei Qi. An Ping sees red when Zhong Shang confesses his love for Mei Qi. Li Shi storms to Mei Qi's house to look for An Ping but is chased away by Mei Qi who threatens to call the police.
66	23	"Episode 23"	January 16, 2008
Being comatose for a long time, Mei Xue develops amnesia and cannot recognize anyone. When Mei Xue sees Zhong Shang and keeps calling him Da Wei, Mei Qi has a scare as she knows Da Wei is Mei Xue's ex-boyfriend and Ying Jun's real father.
67	24	"Episode 24"	January 17, 2008
Mei Xue is set up by Martin and meets with a fatal mishap when leaving the hospital. Mei Xue recognizes Ha Sa Yan is An Xin when he is praying for her and confesses to him that Ying Jun is not his real son but he is nonchalant about it. In her dying hours, Mei Xue finally recognizes everyone.
68	25	"Episode 25"	January 18, 2008
Ha Sa Yan resumes his identity as An Xin and bequeaths all his assets to Ying Jun and Ying Xiong. Ying Jun and Yu Sheng's marriage is on the rocks as Ying Jun blames Yu Sheng for Mei Xue's death.
69	26	"Episode 26"	January 21, 2008
To save their marriage, Yusheng proposes a temporary separation from Yingjun. They come to a compromise and separate amicably. Zixin, whose real identity is Chang Ying, begins his revenge on Martin and Shuiling.
70	27	"Episode 27"	January 22, 2008
Lishi gives birth to a baby boy. Meiqi is dejected when everyone congratulates Anping for being a father at his age. Meiqi spends the night with Zhongshang on a garden bench, inviting rumours of them dating.
71	28	"Episode 28"	January 23, 2008
Zixin and Yusheng start their own detective investigation firm at Meiqi's house. Zixin receives their first assignment to investigate a white-collar crime involving Martin. Xiao Bin is grateful to Jinsha when she trusts he did not impregnate his good friend Xinxin.
72	29	"Episode 29"	January 24, 2008
Zixin asks Wenya to collaborate with him by dating Yingjun to arouse Yusheng's jealousy. His plan backfires when Yusheng appears nonchalant over a photo of Yingjun and Wenya dancing.
73	30	"Episode 30"	January 25, 2008
Yusheng's suspicions of Wenya and Yingjun dating are aroused when Wenya appears dodgy on the phone. Yusheng chooses to believe Wenya when the latter tells her she is not dating Yingjun. Wenya feels guilty when she sees Yusheng trusting her completely.
74	31	"Episode 31"	January 28, 2008
Wenya is evasive when Yusheng calls her after spotting her with Yingjun having a meal. Yingjun turns down Wenya’s invitation when he realizes she still has feelings for him. Yusheng believes Wenya when the latter said she is instigated by Zixin to pretend to date Yingjun. Wenya and Yingjun meet again and Yusheng happens to see Wenya falling into Yingjun’s arms.
75	32	"Episode 32"	January 29, 2008
Anping discovers Lishi is the mastermind behind Yusheng’s imprisonment and wants to break up with her. Li Shi douses herself with petrol, intending to set herself, Anping and their son on fire. Meiqi rushes over and tries to talk her out of it. Lishi sees Anping and Meiqi’s deep concern for each other and suffers a heart attack. Before she passes away, she entrusts the care of her son Jiabao to Meiqi.
76	33	"Episode 33"	January 30, 2008
Anxin’s lawyer produces the authorization letter signed by Anxin three months ago, detailing that his assets are to be bequeathed to Yingjun and Yingxiong. Shuiling is shocked to learn that Anxin is still alive. She believes it is a plot set up by Anxin and Yingjun to drive her and her son away. Yingjun denies it and declares that Yingxiong will always be his brother.
77	34	"Episode 34"	January 31, 2008
A famous Japanese supplier invites Yinsha to participate in their overseas training sessions. She is elated and decides to bring Zhaoyang and her daughter together but Zhaoyang’s mother objects to the idea, accusing her of attempting to separate her and her son. Jinsha is pregnant but Naifa suspects she has an affair with Zhaoyang.
78	35	"Episode 35"	February 1, 2008
Shuiling embezzles company funds, causing a cash flow problem for Da Ying Jia. Just when Yingjun is fretting over the issue, Li Dawei appears and invests in the company. Yingjun is suspicious of Dawei’s motive. Anping and Meiqi do not dare to tell Yingjun Dawei is his father; instead they encourage him to accept Dawei’s help.
79	36	"Episode 36"	February 4, 2008
Wenya officially declares war on Yusheng by openly courting Yingjun. Anping and Meiqi worry when Dawei gets closer to Yingjun. Anping decides to court Meiqi when he sees her and Zhongshang on close terms.
80	37	"Episode 37"	February 5, 2008
Shuiling smells a rat when she sees Dawei trying to get close to Yingjun. Martin manages to get hold of Yingjun and Dawei’s DNA and proves that they are father and son. Shuiling capitalizes on this finding to expose Yingjun’s real identity and insists he renounces his shares in the company.
81	38	"Episode 38"	February 6, 2008
Yingjun cannot fathom why Anping and Meiqi did not tell him about his birthright. Yingjun is discouraged after Shuiling chases him and Yusheng out of the house, and decides to give up. Yusheng and Zixin gang up to dress up as ghosts to scare Shuiling, causing her to gradually lose her sanity.
82	39	"Episode 39"	February 7, 2008
Wenya discovers that Martin and Shuiling had plotted to murder Anxin, Chang Ying and Meixue. Martin attempts to murder Wenya but a near-insane Shuiling stops him in the nick of time. Shuiling suffers a mental collapse and blurts out Martin’s murder attempt on Wenya. Yusheng overhears it and is hotly pursued by a murderous Martin. Yusheng manages to escape with Zixin’s help. Martin and Shuiling are eventually arrested; Shuiling breaks down totally and is admitted into a mental hospital.
83	40	"Episode 40 (Finale)"	February 8, 2008
Meiqi is unable to choose between Anping and Zhongshang. Anping respects Meiqi’s decision and wishes her well. Meiqi is touched by Anping’s selfless love and decides to leave Zhongshang. Anping returns home and the family is reunited once more.
