= Gatekeepers (game show) =

- 小兵迎大将
- Genre: Game show
- Presented by: Guo Liang; Dennis Chew
- Original language: Chinese
- No. of episodes: 13

Production
- Producer: Elaine See 施意玲
- Running time: approx. 46 minutes

Original release
- Network: MediaCorp Channel 8
- Release: 31 August – 23 November 2010

Related
- Don't Forget the Lyrics! All-Star Edition; Home Makeover; All Pass (Taiwanese game show) 1 vs. 100

Gatekeepers (小兵迎大将) is a Singaporean Chinese language game show which aired in 2010 on MediaCorp Channel 8. The series premiered on 31 August 2010 and ended on 23 November, airing on 13 Tuesday nights at 8:00pm. Hosted by Guo Liang along with Dennis Chew (as "Aunty Lucy"), each episode features 36 Primary 5 and 6 students from a primary school who are challenged with the task of "defending" a cash prize of S$18,000 for their school against a team of 3 celebrity contestants.

The show was nominated for the Best Variety Show award for the Star Awards 2011.

== Rules ==
The rules of Gatekeepers is basically similar to 1 vs. 100 but also crosses with Are You Smarter than a 5th Grader?; a team of three celebrities (or contestants) faced off against 36 different Primary 5 and 6 students from a school, each seated in a cubicle. A contestant choose from one of the eight possible subjects, and a multiple-choice question with four options is revealed. As like 1 vs. 100, the students are given a short amount of time to lock in their answer before the contestant is given the opportunity to answer the question. If the contestant answers correctly, all the students that answered the question incorrectly are eliminated from further play, bringing the team closer to winning the game. The amount of money in the team's bank also increases by a fixed rate of S$500, which is dependent on the number of students eliminated in that question. However, if the contestant is incorrect, their turn ends and no money will be banked for the team. The contestant's turn ends automatically after answering his or her eighth question, after which the contestant has to step down for the remainder of the game. Unlike 1 vs. 100, contestants or teams may not walk away at any point during the game, and all three contestants were required to participate.

The game ends when all members of either side have been eliminated. If the team successfully eliminated every one of 36 students per every correct answer, the team will win whatever they've banked at the end of the game, which would go to a charity of their choice. If all the members of the team were eliminated and at least one student survives at the end of the game, the team loses while the school wins any money they have left at the end. Up to S$18,000 can be won from one team at the end of the game, whichever if all 36 students have either survived or eliminated by the team at the end of the game.

=== Helps ===
The celebrities receives opportunities to receive assistance from the students, known as "helps". Five helps are offered, which could only be used once throughout the entire game. Only one help can be used per question.

- 同舟共济: The celebrity discusses the question with the other team members.
- 军师出马: Similar to "Phone-a-Friend" from Who Wants To Be A Millionaire?, the celebrity phones a friend to assist with the question. Unlike Millionaire, there is no 30-second time limit and the celebrity and friend can freely discuss the question.
- 刺探军情: One student was randomly selected by the celebrity, allowing the celebrity to use their answer as reference before they give their own.
- 一箭双雕: Similar to "50:50" from Who Wants To Be A Millionaire?, two random incorrect answers were eliminated from the current question, leaving behind the correct answer and one incorrect answer.
- 寡不敌众: The celebrity is forced to go with the answer selected by the majority of the students (i.e. the answer which most of the students chose). If there is a tie between 2 or more answers as the majority, the celebrity can choose between those answers.

=== Question topics ===
All questions asked in the show are based on the national curriculum taught in Singaporean schools.

- Primary 3 or 4 Science
- Primary 3 Maths
- Primary 4 Maths
- Primary 5 Chinese
- Primary 5 Social Studies
- Primary 5 or 6 Science
- Primary 6 Chinese
- Home Economics/Life Skills

== Episodes ==
Indicates the school team had at least one member remaining and the celebrity teams loses, with the students winning the remaining prize money.
Indicates all 36 members from the school team were eliminated and the celebrity team wins the money for charity.

Episode	School	Remaining Students	Guest Personalities (in order of playing)		Prize money
1	Catholic High School (Primary) 公教附小	7	Variety Show Hosts	Quan Yi Fong; Michelle Chia; Dasmond Koh	$3,500
2	Raffles Girls' Primary School 莱佛士女子小学	1	Celebrity Mums	Hong Huifang; Chen Xiuhuan; Diana Ser	$500
3	Anglo-Chinese School (Primary) 英华小学	0	"University wits"	Jerry Yeo; Elvin Ng; Cavin Soh	$8,000
4	Maha Bodhi School 菩提学校	0	Characters	"Ah Tao" from The Little Nyonya (Ng Hui) "Mao Wang" from King of Thrift (Ben Yeo) "Xiao Long Nü" from Comedy Nite (Patricia Mok)	$13,000
5	Nan Hua Primary School 南华小学	2	Artistes from China	Dai Yangtian; Zhou Ying; Zhang Zhenhuan	$1,000
6	Ngee Ann Primary School 义安小学	0	Actors	Tay Ping Hui; Chen Tianwen; Zhu Houren	$16,500
7	Mee Toh School 弥陀学校	0	Celebrity Dads	Baey Yam Keng MP; Dr Wilson Goh; Zheng Geping	$18,000
8	Maris Stella High School (Primary) 海星中学附小	1	Former student athletes	Chen Liping; Hu Shuxian; Wang Yuqing	$500
9	Paya Lebar Methodist Girls' School (Primary) 巴耶利峇美以美女子小学	0	Variety Show Hosts (new generation)	Pornsak; Lin Peifen; Lee Teng	$17,500
10	Nanyang Primary School 南洋小学	3	Directors/Actors	Mark Lee; Jeremy Chan; Royston Tan	$1,500
11	Rulang Primary School 孺廊小学	5	Newscasters/DJs	Marcus Chin; Zhao Wen Bei; Leong Sze Hian	$2,500
12	St. Hilda's Primary School 圣希尔达小学	0	Food connoisseurs	Cavin Soh; Kym Ng; Chef Eric Teo	$12,000
13	Pei Chun Public School 公立培群学校	1	Star Search alumni	Chew Chor Meng; Ann Kok; Andie Chen	$500

== Controversy ==
Prior to the broadcast of the third episode, an ongoing online feud between host Guo Liang and Elvin Ng (one of the contestants on that episode) caused over comments exchanged in the dressing room during filming of the series Breakout (in which both Guo and Ng were actors). The trailer also aired the feud, causing the viewership ratings to drop, and become the only episode to be given a Parental Guidance (PG) rating.
