= The Score (Singaporean TV series) =

- 无花果
- Genre: PG - violence Thriller
- Starring: Zhang Yaodong; Paige Chua; Pierre Png; Cai Peixuan; Xiang Yun; Huang Wenyong; Terence Cao
- Opening theme: 谁 by Wu Hui Bing
- Country of origin: Singapore
- Original language: Chinese
- No. of episodes: 25

Production
- Running time: approx. 45 minutes

Original release
- Network: MediaCorp Channel 8
- Release: 4 October – 5 November 2010

Related
- The Family Court; Mrs P.I.

The Score (Chinese: 无花果) is a Singaporean Chinese drama which was telecasted on Singapore's free-to-air channel, MediaCorp Channel 8. It stars Zhang Yaodong, Paige Chua, Pierre Png, Cai Peixuan, Xiang Yun, Huang Wenyong & Terence Cao as the main casts of the series. It made its debut on 4 October 2010 and ended on 5 November 2010. This drama serial consists of 25 episodes, and was screened on every weekday night at 9:00 pm. The encore is being made from 28 September 2011 to 1 November 2011 at every weekday at 5:30pm. Due to its violent scenes, this drama was not awarded any nominations in acting categories at the Star Awards 2011.

== Cast ==
- Zhang Yaodong as Luo Shunbang (James)
- Paige Chua as Zhou Tianlan
- Pierre Png as Luo Shunan
- Cai Peixuan as Hong Youli (Yuki)
- Xiang Yun as Xu Anna
- Huang Wenyong as Luo Zhigang
- Terence Cao as Su Nancheng
- Huang Shinan as Hong Shichuan (Mark)
- Adam Chen as David Zhang
- Richard Low as Luo Zhibin
- Yan Bingliang as Xu Xiong
- Desmond Sim as Albert
