= Star Awards 2011 =

Singaporean television awards

Star Awards 2011 红星大奖2011
- Date: 17 April 2011 - Show 1; 24 April 2011 - Show 2
- Location: Show 1: MediaCorp TV Theatre; Walk of Fame, Show 2 and Post-show: Marina Bay Sands
- Country: Singapore
- Hosted by: Show 1: Bryan Wong; Kym Ng; Dasmond Koh; Pornsak; Walk of Fame; Lee Teng; Pornsak; Dasmond Koh; Vivian Lai; Show 2 Guo Liang; Quan Yi Fong; Post-Show Party; Lee Teng; Pornsak; Dasmond Koh; Christina Lim

Highlights
- Most awards: Drama: Breakout (7); Variety/Info-ed: Love On A Plate (4)
- Most nominations: Drama: Breakout (19); Variety/Info-ed: Black Rose (7)
- Best Drama: Breakout
- Best Variety Show: Love On A Plate
- All-time Favourite Artiste: Xiang Yun
- Website: "Official website".

Television/radio coverage
- Network: MediaCorp Channel 8 MediaCorp Channel U
- Runtime: 180 mins (both presentations); 60 mins (Walk of Fame and Post-show)

Star Awards 2011 (Chinese: 红星大奖 2011) was a double television award ceremony held in Singapore. It is part of the annual Star Awards organised by MediaCorp for the two free-to-air channels, MediaCorp Channel 8 and MediaCorp Channel U.

As like the preceding year's ceremony, this year's Star Awards were broadcast in two live-telecast shows on Channel 8, on 17 and 24 April. The first show, titled 银光闪耀 (lit. Blinding Silverlight) was broadcast live on 17 April 2011 at MediaCorp Studios, which primarily focuses on giving out mostly technical awards and the Favourite popularity awards which introduced since last year. The second show, titled 金碧辉映 (lit. Golden Splendour) was broadcast live on 24 April 2011 at the Grand Ballroom in Resorts World Sentosa, which was the main award ceremony, followed by a post-show party (telecast on Channel U) after the ceremony concluded.

The year's leading contender, Breakout (which had 19 nominations), became the biggest winning drama serial of the year, clinching a total of five awards including the Best Drama Serial. Comedy satire Black Rose broke a record of having the most nominations by variety/info-ad programme in a single year with seven, but cooking documentary variety show Love On A Plate set another record of wins most awards for a Variety Programme, with four.

== Programme details ==
Date	Shows	Time	Channel	Venue
17 April 2011	Star Awards 2011 Show 1	7:00pm to 10:00pm	MediaCorp Channel 8	MediaCorp TV Theatre
24 April 2011	Star Awards 2011 Red Carpet (Walk of Fame)	5:30pm to 6:30pm	MediaCorp Channel 8	Resorts World Sentosa
24 April 2011	Star Awards 2011 Show 2	7:00pm to 10:00pm	MediaCorp Channel 8	Resorts World Sentosa
24 April 2011	Star Awards 2011 Party Yeah!	10:00pm to 11:00pm	MediaCorp Channel U	Resorts World Sentosa

== Nominees and winners ==
Unless otherwise stated, winners are listed first, highlighted in boldface.

=== Show 1 ===
The show opened at 7.00pm with a two-and-a-half minute parody opening containing mashup of various Chinese programmes of 2010–11, and many dialogues or shots from a selected number of scenes are edited (to fit the Star Awards theme) and the voices are dubbed by different artistes (all nominees). When the show opens, the show hosts Dasmond Koh, Kym Ng, Bryan Wong and Pornsak were dubbed with voices of Wong, Pornsak, Koh and Ng, respectively, who then explaining the opening's disclaimer after the voices are fixed.

==== Main category ====
Winners and nominees:

**Best Drama Theme Song 最佳主题曲**: **Jeff Chang 张信哲 – Breakout 破天网 – 《网》**; Serene Koong 龚芝怡 – New Beginnings 红白囍事 – 《在我左右》; Cavin Soh 苏智诚 – The Best Things in Life 五福到 – 《知足》; Derrick Hoh 何维健 – The Illusionist 魔幻视界 – 《变化》; Zhiren Huang 黄智仁 – With You 我在你左右 – 《感.受》	**Young Talent Award 青苹果奖**: **Regene Lim 林詠谊 – Happy Family 过好年 as Dong Cheng Feng 董成凤**; Fraser Tiong Kah Kee 张家奇 – Happy Family 过好年 as Dong Cheng Long 董成龙; Grace Ng Xin Yi 黄馨仪 – The Best Things In Life 五福到 as Qi Qi 琪琪; Jerald Tan 陈杰乐 – Breakout 破天网 as Xiao Zhen Feng 小振锋; Kaylar Ong Zhi Wei 王子薇 – With You 我在你左右 as Wei Wei 薇薇
**Best Costume and Image Design 最佳服装与造型设计**: **Annie Chua 蔡宜君 – Star Search 2010 Grand Finals 才华横溢出新秀 大决赛**; Mark Chua 蔡锦福 – Lunar New Year Eve Special 2010 普天同庆金虎年; Stella Tan 陈玮婷 – Gatekeepers 小兵迎大将; Xu Ying Ying 徐盈盈 – Black Rose 爆料黑玫瑰; Xu Ying Ying 徐盈盈 – Breakout 破天网	**Best Screenplay 最佳剧本**: **Chen Sew Khoon 陈秀群 and Lau Chin Poon 刘清盆 - With You 我在你左右**; Ang Eng Tee 洪荣狄 - Breakout 破天网; Ng Kah Huay 黄佳华 - The Family Court 走进走出; Phang Kai Yee 彭凯毅 - Unriddle 最火搭档; Seah Choon Guan 谢俊源 and Yeo Saik Pin 杨锡彬 - New Beginnings 红白喜事
**Best Director 最佳导演**: **Chong Liung Man 张龙敏 – Breakout 破天网**; Edmund Tse 谢益文 – Your Hand in Mine 想握你的手; Leong Lye Lin 梁来玲 – The Best Things in Life 五福到; Loo Yin Kam 卢燕金 – The Family Court 走进走出; Wong Foon Hwee 黄芬菲 – Unriddle 最火搭档	**Best Variety Producer 最佳综艺编导**: **Kang Lay See 江丽丝 – Love On A Plate 名厨出走记**; Gan Bee Khim 颜美琴 – Dream Potter 梦．窑匠; Glen Lim 林祥平 – Star Awards 2010 红星大奖2010; Jean Toh 卓金云 – Star Search 2010 Grand Finals 才华横溢出新秀 大决赛; Tan Boon Chong 陈文聪 – Food Source 食在好源头
**Best Variety Research Writer 最佳综艺资料撰稿**: **Teo Kim Kee 张琴棋 – Love On A Plate 名厨出走记**; Hon Sher Ee 潘雪忆 – Food Source 食在好源头; Lim Kar Yee 林嘉仪 – Dream Potter 梦．窑匠; Loong Li Li 龙俐利 – Star Search 2010 Grand Finals 才华横溢出新秀 大决赛; Wong Eng Hong 王应鸿 – Going Home 回家走走	**Best Promotional Video 最佳宣传短片**: **Danny Loh Boon Kiat 罗文杰 – The Little Nyonya (Encore Telecast) 小娘惹 (重播)**; Howe Choon Jin 何宗锦 – Don't Forget the Lyrics! All-Stars 我要唱下去！名人版; Liew Lee Ming 刘俐敏 – The Illusionist 魔幻视界; Ng Wan Churn 黄婉琛 – New Beginnings 红白囍事; Vivian Wong 王婉君 – Gatekeepers 小兵迎大将
**Best Music & Sound Design 最佳音乐与音效设计**: **Liung Siew Ming 龙淑明 and Zheng Kai Hua 郑凯华 – Breakout 破天网**; Gao Jun Wei 高俊伟 and Thong Meng Sun 唐明心 – The Family Court 走进走出; Liung Siew Ming 龙淑明 and Teng Kim Lian 陈金莲 – With You 我在你左右; Thong Meng Sun 唐明心 and Teng Kim Lian 陈金莲 – The Score 无花果; Zheng Kai Hua 郑凯华 and Martin See 施忠明 – Unriddle 最火搭档	**Best Editing 最佳剪辑**: **Lam Wai Kit 林伟杰 – Star Search 2010 Audition 才华千里寻星 (Episode 1)**; Cynthia Chia 谢素珊 – Love On A Plate 名厨出走记 (Episode 10); Eu Chuin Fang 余群芳 – Dream Potter 梦．窑匠 (Episode 3); Jane How Lee Chern 侯莉真 – Lodge With Me 我行我宿 (Episode 3); Low Li Lian 刘丽莲 – Life Transformers 2 心晴大动员 2 (Episode 10)
**Best News Story 最佳新闻报道**: **Evelyn Lam Li Ting 蓝丽婷 – Orchard Road Flash Floods 乌节路积水**; Liang Kai Xin 梁凯欣 – Ticket Resaling of iPhones in Beijing 北京iPhone黄牛党; Ng Lian Cheong 吴俍祥 – Train Service Disruption 地铁服务暂停 转换站涌现人潮; Wang Zheng 王征 – Oil Pollution around Coasts 海岸线油污覆盖 影响生意; Zhang Haijie 张海洁 – Kallang Murder 加冷连环劫杀案
**Best Current Affairs Story 最佳时事报道**: **Grace Yang Hsiao Hung 杨晓红 – Focus 焦点 – A Century Running for Kwong Wai Shiu Hospital 百年行善广惠肇**; Chan Wai Hoe 陈伟豪 – Focus 焦点 – The Flash Floods of Singapore 新加坡水淹三重奏; Eugene Lim 林锦成 – Frontline 前线追踪 – The Story of a Wanderer 浪人的故事; Leck Chye Peng 陆彩萍 – Frontline 前线追踪 – Women with Swollen Elephant-like Legs 象腿婆婆不领情?; Yap Li Ling 叶莉凌 – Frontline 前线追踪 – The Monkeys that Disturbs the Neighbours 猴闹民宅

==== Awards eligible for audience voting ====
**Favourite On-screen Couple (Drama) 最喜爱应募情侣**: **Christopher Lee 李铭顺 and Jeanette Aw 欧萱 – Breakout 破天网**; Chen Hanwei 陈汉玮 and Rui En 瑞恩 – With You 我在你左右; Tay Ping Hui 郑斌辉 and Chris Tong 童冰玉 – The Family Court 走进走出; Yao Wenlong 姚玟隆 and Cynthia Koh 许美珍 – Mrs P.I. 查某人; Elvin Ng 黄俊雄 and Zhou Ying 周颖 – Breakout 破天网	**Favourite On-screen Partners (Variety) 最喜爱综艺搭档**: **Quan Yi Fong 权怡凤 and Christopher Lee 李铭顺 – Life Transformers 2 心情大动员2**; Mark Lee 李国煌 and Bryan Wong 王禄江 – Home Decor Survivor 4 摆家乐4; Michelle Chia 谢韵仪, Vivian Lai 赖怡伶, Michelle Chong 庄米雪 and Yuan Shuai 袁帅 – U're the Man! 花样型男; Lee Teng 李腾 and Chris Tong 童冰玉 – Dream Potter 梦。窑匠; Guo Liang 郭亮, Quan Yi Fong 权怡凤, Michelle Chong 庄米雪, Dennis Chew 周崇庆, Dasmond Koh 许振荣 and Chen Hanwei 陈汉玮 – Black Rose 爆料黑玫瑰
**Favourite Male Character 最喜爱男角色**: **Elvin Ng – Breakout 破天网 as Zou Jieming 邹杰明**; Chen Hanwei – The Best Things of Life 五福到 as Wufu 五福; Thomas Ong – The Illusionist 魔幻视界 as James Lee; Qi Yuwu – The Family Court 走进走出 as Lin Leshan 林乐山; Guo Liang – Black Rose 爆料黑玫瑰 as Chang Fei 张菲	**Favourite Female Character 最喜爱女角色**: **Rui En – Happy Family 过好年 as Yang Xiaodong 杨小东**; Quan Yi Fong – Black Rose 爆料黑玫瑰 as Yao Yao 摇摇; Michelle Chong – Black Rose 爆料黑玫瑰 as Xie Yu Yu 谢谕谕; Jeanette Aw – Breakout 破天网 as Yang Nianqing 杨念青; Zhou Ying – Breakout 破天网 as Tang Ying 汤颖
**Systema Charming Smile Award 灿烂笑容奖**: **Elvin Ng 黄俊雄**

==== Other awards ====
===== Rocket award =====
**Rocket Award** **年度飞跃奖**	**Pornsak**

===== Viewership awards =====
**Top Rated Drama Serial 2010** **最高收视率电视剧 2010**	**With You** **我在你左右**
**Top Rated Variety Series 2010** **最高收视率综艺节目 2010**	**Life Transformers 2** **心情大动员2**

=== Show 2 ===
==== Main category ====
Winners and nominees:

**Best Drama Serial 最佳电视剧**: **Breakout 破天网**; With You 我在你左右; The Family Court 走进走出; New Beginnings 红白囍事; Unriddle 最火搭档	**Best Variety Programme 最佳综艺节目**: **Love On A Plate 名厨出走记**; Dream Potter 梦.窑匠; Food Source 食在好源头; Gatekeepers 小兵迎大将; Going Home 回家走走
**Best Variety Special 最佳综艺特备节目**: **Star Awards 2010 (Show 1) 红星大奖2010 亮闪八方**; Renci Charity Show 2010 仁心慈爱照万千2010; Star Search 2010 Grand Finals 才华横溢出新秀 大决赛; Thong Chai Charity Night 同济医院慈善夜; Thye Hua Kwan Charity Show 2010 太和观 一心一德为善乐	**Best Info-ed Programme 最佳资讯节目**: **Tuesday Report - 3 Days 2 Nights 星期二特写: 三天两夜**; Behind Every Job 美差事。苦差事; Food Notes 上食堂; Legendary Cuisine 传说中的料理; The Activist's Journey 仁心侠旅
**Best Actor 最佳男主角**: **Qi Yuwu 戚玉武 – The Family Court 走进走出 as Lin Leshan**; Tay Ping Hui 郑斌辉 – The Family Court 走进走出 as Shen Xiping; Shaun Chen 陈泓宇 – Your Hand In Mine 想握你的手 as Li Liqin 李立勤; Christopher Lee 李铭顺 – Breakout 破天网 as Situ Dongcheng 司徒东城; Elvin Ng 黄俊雄 – Breakout 破天网 as Zou Jieming 邹杰明	**Best Actress 最佳女主角**: **Rui En 瑞恩 – With You 我在你左右 as Ye Siqi 叶思琪**; Chen Liping 陈莉萍 – Unriddle 最火搭档 as Lin Zhengyi (Da Bao); Joanne Peh 白薇秀 – Your Hand In Mine 想握你的手 as Wu Youqing 吴有情; Zhou Ying 周颖 – Breakout 破天网 as Tang Ying 汤颖; Jeanette Aw 欧萱 – Breakout 破天网 as Yang Nianqing 杨念青
**Best Supporting Actor 最佳男配角**: **Terence Cao 曹国辉 – The Best Things in Life 五福到**; Andie Chen 陈邦鋆 – Precious Babes 三个女人一个宝 as Fu Weide; Darren Lim 林明伦 – Breakout 破天网 as Wang Lianzhou 汪连州; Yao Wenlong 姚玟隆 – The Family Court 走进走出 as Huang Guanying; Zzen Zhang 章缜翔 – Unriddle 最火搭档	**Best Supporting Actress 最佳女配角**: **Pan Lingling 潘玲玲 – Breakout 破天网 as Cai Siling 蔡思灵**; Ann Kok 郭舒贤 – The Family Court 走进走出 as Zhao Ning; Cynthia Koh 许美珍 – Happy Family 过好年 as Jian Mei'e; Lin Meijiao 林梅娇 – Breakout 破天网 as Bai Huahua 白花花; Xiang Yun 向云 – Unriddle 最火搭档 as Yang Qiu Jun
**Best Variety Show Host 最佳综节目艺主持人**: **Kym Ng 鐘琴 – Love On A Plate 名厨出走记**; Bryan Wong 王禄江 – Home Decor Survivor 4 摆家乐4; Guo Liang 郭亮 – Black Rose 爆料黑玫瑰; Michelle Chong 庄米雪 – Black Rose 爆料黑玫瑰; Pornsak – Food Source 食在好源头	**Best Info-Ed Show Host 最佳资讯节目主持人**: **Joanne Peh 白薇秀 – The Activist's Journey 仁心侠旅**; Belinda Lee 李心钰 – Stars For A Cause 2 明星志工队2; Bryan Wong 王禄江 – Behind Every Job 美差事。苦差事; Guo Liang 郭亮 – Legendary Cuisine 传说中的料理; Mark Lee 李国煌 – Behind Every Job 美差事。苦差事
**Best News Anchor 最佳新闻主播**: **Lin Chi Yuan 林启元**; Tung Soo Hua 董素华; Wang Zheng 王征; Zhang Haijie 张海洁; Zhao Wenbei 赵文蓓	**Best Current Affairs Presenter 最佳时事节目主持人**: **Tung Soo Hua 董素华 – Money Week 财经追击**; Chun Guek Lay 曾月丽 – Focus 焦点; Desmond Lim Soo Guan 林树源 – Good Morning Singapore! 早安您好!; Youyi 有懿 – Good Morning Singapore! 早安您好!; Qi Qi 琪琪 – Good Morning Singapore! 早安您好!

==== Awards eligible for audience voting ====
This was the first ceremony in history of Star Awards the nominations for the Top 10 Most Popular Artistes was not 20 (for each gender), as 21 artistes (for each gender) were shortlisted. Similar to the past awards, the Top 10 Most Popular Artistes commenced after the nominations (on 17 March 2011), and voting closes until 24 April at 9pm.

Note	Description
	Made it to top 10 in the week / Fall under the Top n category.
n	How many of this awards the awardee got.
**10**	To be awarded the All-Time Favourite Artiste in the next Star Awards.

Stage:
Stage:	Top 10^{1}
Artist	Results
**Top 10 Most Popular Male Artists 十大最受欢迎男艺人**
**Dennis Chew 周崇庆**	2
**Chen Hanwei 陈汉玮**	8
Zhu Houren 朱厚任	
Gurmit Singh 葛米星	
Dai Yang Tian 戴阳天	
Pierre Png 方展发	
Guo Liang 郭亮	
Terence Cao 曹国辉	
Chen Shucheng 陈澍城	
**Bryan Wong 王禄江**	8
**Qi Yuwu 戚玉武**	7
**Tay Ping Hui 郑斌辉**	**10**
Ben Yeo 杨志龙	
**Huang Wenyong 黄文永**	1
Richard Low 刘谦益	
**Elvin Ng 黄俊雄**	5
Dasmond Koh 许振荣	
**Zhang Yaodong 张耀栋**	3
Shaun Chen 陈泓宇	
**Pornsak**	2
**Zheng Geping 郑各评**	3
**Top 10 Most Popular Female Artistes 十大最受欢迎女艺人**
**Ann Kok 郭舒贤**	6
**Quan Yi Fong 权怡凤**	6
**Joanne Peh 白薇秀**	5
Kym Ng 鐘琴	
Cynthia Koh 许美珍	
Priscelia Chan 曾诗梅	
Lin Mei Jiao 林梅娇	
**Vivian Lai 赖怡伶**	7
**Michelle Chia 谢韵仪**	6
**Rui En 瑞恩**	6
Eelyn Kok 郭蕙雯	
Belinda Lee 李心钰	
Pan Ling Ling 潘玲玲	
Paige Chua 蔡琦慧	
**Jeanette Aw 欧萱**	7
Tiffany Leong 梁丽芳	
**Yvonne Lim 林湘萍**	4
**Zhou Ying 周颖**	1
Hong Hui Fang 洪慧芳	
**Michelle Chong 庄米雪**	2
Christina Lim 林佩芬	

: Even though the hosts announced that which 18 and 16 artistes (of each category) were currently leading, the actual number of artistes (of each category) shown in the leaderboard were respectively 17 and 15, due to a technical glitch.

==== All Time Favourite Artiste ====
This award is a special achievement award given out to a veteran artiste(s) who have achieved a maximum of 10 popularity awards over 10 years.

**All Time Favourite Artiste** **超级红星**	**Xiang Yun 向云**	2000 | 2001 | 2002 | 2003 | 2004 | 2005 | 2006 | 2007 | 2009 | 2010

=== Post show party awards ===
**最 i 明星风范奖 i Weekly Most Stylish (Male)**: **Elvin Ng 黄俊雄**	**最 i 明星风范奖 i Weekly Most Stylish (Female)**: **Jeanette Aw 欧萱**	**Yes933 星光魅丽奖 Y.E.S. 93.3FM Award**: **Qi Yuwu 戚玉武**

== Summary of nominations and awards (by programme genre) ==
=== Most nominations ===
Programs that received multiple nominations are listed below, by number of nominations per work:

Drama Series	Nominations
Breakout	19
The Family Court	10
With You	8
Unriddle	7
The Best Things in Life 五福到	5
Happy Family	4
New Beginnings	3
The Illusionist 魔幻视界	3
Your Hand in Mine	3
The Little Nyonya	1
The Score	1
Precious Babes	1

Variety/Info-ed	Nominations
Black Rose	7
Love On A Plate 名厨出走记	5
Dream Potter 梦．窑匠	4
Food Source 食在好源头	4
Star Search 2010	4
Behind Every Job 美差事。苦差事	3
Focus 焦点	3
Frontline 前线追踪	3
Gatekeepers	3
The Activist's Journey 仁心侠旅	2
Going Home 回家走走	2
Home Decor Survivor 4 摆家乐4	2
Legendary Cuisine传说中的料理	2
Star Awards 2010 红星大奖2010	2
Don't Forget the Lyrics! 我要唱下去！	1
Food Notes 上食堂	1
Life Transformers 2 心晴大动员 2	1
Lodge With Me 我行我宿	1
Lunar New Year Eve Special 2010 普天同庆金虎年	1
Money Week 财经追击	1
Renci Charity Show 2010 仁心慈爱照万千2010	1
Stars For A Cause 2 明星志工队2	1
Thong Chai Charity Night 同济医院慈善夜	1
Thye Hua Kwan Charity Show 2010 太和观 一心一德为善乐	1
Tuesday Report 星期二特写	1

=== Most wins ===
Drama Series	Wins
Breakout 破天网	5
With You 我在你左右	3
Happy Family 过好年	2
The Family Court 走进走出	1
The Little Nyonya 小娘惹	1

Variety/Info-ed	Wins
Love On A Plate 名厨出走记	4
Star Search 2010 才华横溢出新秀	2
Life Transformers 2 心晴大动员 2	2
Focus 焦点	1
Star Awards 2010 红星大奖2010	1
Tuesday Report 星期二特写	1
The Activist's Journey 仁心侠旅	1
Money Week 财经追击	1

== Presenters and performers ==
The following individuals presented awards or performed musical numbers.

=== Show 1 ===
Artistes / Special guests	Presented / Performed
Shawn Lee; Megan Zheng	Presented Young Talent Award
Chin Kwee Nyat 陈桂月; Eddie Kuo 郭振羽	Presented Best Current Affairs Story and Best News Story
Francis Cheong 张成辉; Fann Wong	Presented Best Costume and Image Design
CEO and Director, Lion Corporation (Singapore); Gina Tay	Gave out award for Systema Charming Smile Award
Lee Yung Piao 李詠标	Performed a medley of songs: "我吃的起苦", "雾锁南洋", "情感联络站", "早安老师", "如燕" and "边缘少年", dressed up as a selected number of singers (in order): Kang Kang 康康; Huang Pin Yuan 黄品源; Wu Tsing-fong (of Sodagreen); Phil Chang; Nick Chou; Jam Hsiao; Frankie Kao; Lo Ta-yu; Jacky Wu; Jacky Cheung; Wu Bai; Chu Ke-liang; Dave Wang; Fei Yu-ching; Chen Lei 陈雷
Daniel Chan; Lee Wei Song 李伟菘	Presented Best Theme Song and Best Music & Sound Design
Mark Lee 李国煌; Yew Kwang Han 韩耀光	Presented Best Promotional Video and Best Editing
Chen Hanwei 陈汉玮; Huang Biren 黄碧仁	Presented Favourite Female Artiste and Favourite Male Artiste
Royston Tan 陈子谦; Zoe Tay 郑惠玉	Presented Best Screenplay
Celebrities as Nominees	Presented comedic skit "A Day in the Life of a Crew" (电视人的热映路)
Ken Lim 阿Ken; Jack Neo 梁智强; Lin Yu-Chih 纳豆	Presented Best Variety Research Writer (Lim and Neo) and Best Variety Producer (Lin and Neo)
CEO, MediaCorp; Lucas Chow 周永强	Gave out award for Top Rated Variety Series and Top Rated Drama Serial 2010
Daniel Chan 陈晓东	Performed a medley of songs "爱一天多一天" and "要知道你的感觉"
Ken Lim 阿Ken; Lin Yu-Chih 纳豆	Presented Favourite On-screen Couple
MediaCorp Chairman; Teo Ming Kian 张铭坚	Gave out Rocket Award

=== Show 2 ===
Artistes / Special guests	Presented / Performed
Byan Zhou 阿布; NONO	Presented Best Info-ed Programme and Best Info-ed Programme Host
Tay Ping Hui; Chris Tong; Elvin Ng; Jeanette Aw	Addressed Speeches for nomination for Best Drama Serial (The Family Court and Breakout)
Li Tao 李涛; Li Yan Qiu 李艳秋	Presented Best Current Affairs Presenter and Best News Presenter
Kingone Wang; James Wen	Presented Best Supporting Actor and Best Supporting Actress
Mark Lee; Sam Tseng	Presented a dialogue skit for 2010-11 Chinese programmes
Chen Liping; Hong Huifang; Rui En	Addressed Speeches for nomination for Best Drama Serial (Unriddle 2, New Beginnings and With You)
Tai Chih-yuan; Aya Liu	Presented Best Variety Programme and Best Variety Programme Host
Sam Tseng 曾国城; Yao Yuanhao	Presented Best Variety Special and Best Drama Serial
Gordon Lam; Maggie Shiu	Presented Best Actor and Best Actress
S.R. Nathan (President of Singapore)	Gave out award for All-Time Favourite Artiste
Nicky Wu; Fann Wong	Presented Top 10 Most Favourite Male Artistes
Mike He; Aya Liu 柳翰雅	Presented Top 10 Most Favourite Female Artistes

== Trivia ==
=== Consecutive nominees and recipients ===
- The nominations for the "Best Current Affairs Presenter" award are the same from last year.
- Regene Lim received the "Young Talent Award" for the third consecutive year.

=== Firsts in top 10 ===
- Huang Wenyong and Zhou Ying won their first Top 10 Most Popular Artiste, for the former, it was his first win after being nominated for 17 consecutive years.
  - After Zheng Geping made his speech, he went on to thank his family.
- Michelle Chong and Ann Kok received her second and sixth, respectively, Top 10 Most Popular Female Artistes award since 2005 and 1999, respectively.

== Accolades ==
Organisation	Year	Accolade	Representative work	Result
Star Awards	2012	Best Variety Special	Star Awards 2011 Show 1 银光闪耀 红星大奖2011	Won
Star Awards	2012	Best Variety Special	Star Awards 2011 Show 2 金碧辉映 红星大奖2011	Nominated

== See also ==
- MediaCorp Channel 8
- MediaCorp Channel U
- Star Awards
