= New Beginnings (2010 TV series) =

Singaporean TV series

- 红白囍事
- Genre: Dramedy; Family
- Created by: Yeo Saik Pin 杨锡彬; Seah Choon Guan 谢俊源
- Written by: Phang Kai Yee 彭凯毅 and co.
- Directed by: Wong Foong Hwee 黄芬菲 and co.
- Starring: Jeanette Aw; Elvin Ng; Tay Ping Hui; Jesseca Liu; Zhang Zhenhuan; Tracy Tan; Joshua Ang
- Opening theme: 《在我左右》 by Serene Koong
- Ending theme: 《明知我爱你》 by Serene Koong
- Original language: Chinese
- No. of episodes: 20

Production
- Producer: Lai Lee Thin 赖丽婷
- Running time: approx. 45 minutes

Original release
- Network: MediaCorp TV Channel 8
- Release: 14 April 2010

Related
- The Best Things in Life; With You

New Beginnings (红白囍事) is a 20-episode Singaporean drama which debuted on 14 April 2010. It stars Jeanette Aw, Elvin Ng, Tay Ping Hui, Jesseca Liu, Zhang Zhenhuan, Tracy Tan, and Joshua Ang.

== Plot ==
The plot revolves around the Li family, who are in the wedding business, and the Cai family, who run a mortuary. The Chinese traditionally believe that the "red" (represents fortune and happiness) and "white" (associated with death) are not to be associated. As fate would have it, the younger generation cross paths and love blossoms.

== Cast ==
- Richard Low as Cai Fulin 蔡福临, the owner of a funeral parlour
- Jeanette Aw as Cai Shiya 蔡施雅, Cai's eldest daughter and a mortician at Cai's funeral parlour
- Tracy Tan as Cai Shihui 蔡施慧, Cai's second daughter
- Joshua Ang as Cai Shicai 蔡施才, Cai's youngest son who is mentally handicapped
- Elvin Ng as Ye Jiajun 叶家俊, Son of Xiuyun
- Hong Huifang as Li Xiuyun 李秀云, Jiajun's widowed mother
- Lin Meijiao as Yan Ruyi 严如意, Li Jiabao's wife who works as a matchmaker
- Tay Ping Hui as Li Zihao 李子豪, Eldest son of Jiabao and Ruyi who works as a wedding planner
- Zhang Zhenhuan as Li Ziyang 李子扬, Li Zihao's Zihao's younger brother who works as a photographer
- Jesseca Liu as Tang Wenxi 唐汶汐, Li Zihao's business partner and a wedding gown designer

=== Other characters ===
Artiste	Character	Description
Julie Tan	Xiaofang 小芳	Shicai's friend Immigrant from Vietnam who was tricked into prostitution
Yuan Shuai	Fan Yong 范勇	Xiaofang's childhood friend Drug addict
Bryan Chan	Uncle De 德叔	An employee at Fulin's funeral parlour
Ng Hui	Wu Dailin 吴黛琳	Wenxi's cousin
Chen Tianwen	Chen Congming 陈聪明	Dailin's friend (later husband)
Jade Seah	Michelle	Ian's fiancée
Romeo Tan	Tom	
Nick Shen	ZhenXiong	
Bobby Tonelli	Ian	Michelle's fiancé
Yao Wenlong	Lao Shi	
Lawrence Wong	James	Shihui's ex-boyfriend
May Phua		

== Reception ==
Average viewership for each episode is 937,000. It was the second most popular show in 2010.

=== Awards and nominations ===
Organisation	Year	Category	Nominee(s)	Result	Ref.
Star Awards	2011	Best Theme Song 最佳主题曲	《在我左右》 by Serene Koong	Nominated	
Star Awards	2011	Best Screenplay	Seah Choon Guan/Yeo Saik Pin	Nominated	
Star Awards	2011	Best Drama Serial	—N/a	Nominated	
Star Awards	2011	Top Rated Drama Serial 2010	—N/a	Nominated	
