= Star Search (Singaporean TV series) season 10 =

Star Search
- Season 10
- Hosted by: Dasmond Koh; Quan Yi Fong; Guo Liang
- Judges: Ivy Low; Winnie Wong; Andrew Cheng; Kok Len Shoong; Lee Ee Wurn; Yeo Saik Pin; George Chan; Ann Kok; Clarence Lee; Jazreel Low; Keith Png; Chen Hanwei
- Winner: Jeffrey Xu
- Runner-up: Peggy Lin

Release
- Original network: MediaCorp Channel 8
- Original release: 30 August – 5 December 2010

Season chronology
- ← Previous; Season 9 Next → Season 11

Star Search 2010 is the 10th installment of Star Search. Auditions were held across Singapore, Malaysia, China and Taiwan.

The competition began on 30 August 2010. The Semifinal took place on 14 November and Grand Final took place on 5 December 2010. Between the Semifinal and Grand Final, the remaining contestants were put through intensive training.

== Selection process ==
=== Auditions ===
Summary of auditions
Episode Airdate	Audition city	Audition dates	Audition venue	Judges
30 August 2010	Taipei, Taiwan	29–30 May 2010	Arki Galéria	Ivy Low; Winnie Wong
6 September 2010	Taipei, Taiwan	29–30 May 2010	Arki Galéria	Ivy Low; Winnie Wong
13 September 2010	Shanghai, China	19–20 June 2010	Shanghai Teenagers Activity Center	Andrew Cheng; Kok Len Shoong; Lee Ee Wurn
20 September 2010	Shanghai, China	19–20 June 2010	Shanghai Teenagers Activity Center	Andrew Cheng; Kok Len Shoong; Lee Ee Wurn
27 September 2010	Kuala Lumpur, Malaysia	10–11 July 2010	Parkroyal Kuala Lumpur	Andrew Cheng; Lee Ee Wurn; Yeo Saik Pin
4 October 2010	Singapore	24–25 July 2010	Caldecott Broadcast Centre	Andrew Cheng; Kok Len Shoong; Lee Ee Wurn

== Finalists ==
The final 20 finalists were confirmed as follows;

Key:

– Winner
– Runner-up
– Third place

Origin city	Contestants			
Taipei, Taiwan	Teddy Chin 陈立谦	Alex Chuang 庄翔宇	Kristy Ho 何巧雯	Gaga Lu 吕湘湘
Shanghai, China	Vivi Hu 胡薇	Peggy Lin 林佩琪	Jerry Wang 王景羲	Jeffrey Xu 徐鸣杰
Kuala Lumpur, Malaysia	Joycelyn Kah 郭利玲	Stella Koh 辜裕秀	Jeff Lim 林志杰	Sora Ma 马艺瑄
Singapore	Mika Chung 仲璇	Lucas Lai 赖毅豪	Adeline Lim 林赞银	Quek Jin Hao 郭晋豪
Singapore	James Seah 谢宏辉	Romeo Tan 陈罗密欧	YiLynn Teh 郑伊琳	Darryl Yong 杨子文

== Results summary ==
Colour key

–	Contestant did not perform
–	Contestant received the fewest public votes and was immediately eliminated (no final showdown)
–	Contestant received the most public votes

Weekly results per contestant
Contestant	Quarter-finals		Semi-final	Final
Contestant	Week 8	Week 9	Week 11	Week 12
Jeffrey Xu	Bottom seven	—N/a	Safe	Winner
Peggy Lin	—N/a	Top three	Safe	Runner-up
Adeline Lim	—N/a	Bottom seven	Safe	3rd
Romeo Tan	Top three	—N/a	Safe	4th
Sora Ma	—N/a	Top three	Safe	5th
Vivi Hu	—N/a	Bottom seven	Safe	Bottom five
Jeff Lim	Bottom seven	—N/a	Safe	Bottom five
James Seah	Top three	—N/a	Safe	Bottom five
YiLynn Teh	—N/a	Bottom seven	Safe	Bottom five
Darryl Yong	Top three	—N/a	Safe	Bottom five
Teddy Chin	Bottom seven	—N/a	Bottom ten	Eliminated (week 11)
Alex Chuang	Bottom seven	—N/a	Bottom ten	Eliminated (week 11)
Mika Chung	—N/a	Top three	Bottom ten	Eliminated (week 11)
Kristy Ho	—N/a	Bottom seven	Bottom ten	Eliminated (week 11)
Joycelyn Kah	—N/a	Bottom seven	Bottom ten	Eliminated (week 11)
Stella Koh	—N/a	Bottom seven	Bottom ten	Eliminated (week 11)
Lucas Lai	Bottom seven	—N/a	Bottom ten	Eliminated (week 11)
Gaga Lu	—N/a	Bottom seven	Bottom ten	Eliminated (week 11)
Quek Jin Hao	Bottom seven	—N/a	Bottom ten	Eliminated (week 11)
Jerry Wang	Bottom seven	—N/a	Bottom ten	Eliminated (week 11)

== Grand Finals (5 December 2010) ==
The Grand Finals was hosted by Guo Liang, Quan Yi Fong and Dasmond Koh. Former contestants and winners from the 9 previous editions still with MediaCorp were present as well.

The judges were Hong Kong director and actor Lawrence Cheng, veteran Hong Kong actor Ha Yu, former Star Search winner Zoe Tay, MediaCorp deputy CEO Chang Long Jong, current MediaCorp actress Fann Wong and veteran MediaCorp producer Kwek Leng Soong.

=== Competition ===
Q & A Segment

- Host: Chew Chor Meng, Dasmond Koh
- Guest artistes: Black Rose cast – Guo Liang, Quan Yi Fong, Michelle Chong, Lee Teng, Dennis Chew

Acting Segment

- Dramas used and guest artistes: Daddy at Home (Chen Hanwei, Ann Kok, Cynthia Koh), The Little Nyonya (Lin Meijiao, Joanne Peh, Ng Hui, Yao Wenlong), Together (Zheng Geping, Constance Song, Zhang Zhenhuan, Zhou Ying)
