= Precious Babes =

Singaporean TV series

- 3个女人一个宝
- Genre: Family, Women
- Directed by: Lin Ming Zhe (林明哲)
- Starring: Ann Kok; Cynthia Koh; Eelyn Kok; Qi Yuwu; Zheng Geping; Alan Tern
- Opening theme: 依然会微笑 by Ann Kok
- Ending theme: 爱情保险 by Ann Kok
- Country of origin: Singapore
- Original language: Chinese
- No. of episodes: 20

Production
- Running time: approx. 45 minutes per episode

Original release
- Network: MediaCorp Channel 8 NTV7
- Release: 9 June – 6 July 2010

Related
- Housewives' Holiday (2009)

Precious Babes (Chinese: 3个女人一个宝) is a Singaporean Chinese family drama produced by MatrixVision, revolving around the lives of three women who are childhood friends. It made its debut on Singapore's free-to-air channel, MediaCorp Channel 8 on 9 June 2010 and ended on 6 July 2010. It stars Ann Kok, Cynthia Koh, Eelyn Kok, Qi Yuwu, Zheng Geping & Alan Tern as the casts of the series. Consisting of 20 episodes, the drama was screened every weekday night at 9.00 pm. It is also a mid year blockbuster for 2010.

This drama made its rerun from 30 June 2011 and ended on 27 July 2011.

This drama is also imported on one of Malaysia's free-to-air channel, NTV7, weekdays at 6.00pm, made its debut on 6 June 2011 and ended on 1 July 2011.

== Cast ==
- Ann Kok as Lin Huixian, Fu Weiming's wife and a fashion designer
- Cynthia Koh as Katie Ong,Jovan's wife and a fashion designer
- Eelyn Kok as Cui Zhiqing, Yuan Renxian's wife and one of the directors of MatrixVision
- Qi Yuwu as Yuan Renxian, an actor of MatrixVision
- Zheng Geping as Fu Weiming, one of the directors of MatrixVision
- Alan Tern as Jovan
- Wang Xiu Yun as Wu Xiuxiang, mother of Fu Weiming and Fu Weide
- Priscelia Chan as Lin Ailin, Fu Weide's wife
- Andie Chen as Fu Weide, Fu Weiming's younger brother
- Wu Yu Xiang as He Xuemei, Cui Zhiqing's mother
- Zhu Houren as Cui Guoyao, Cui Zhiqing's father

== Reception ==
Average viewership for each episode is 889,000.

=== Accolades ===
Organisation	Year	Award	Nominee(s)	Result	Ref.
Star Awards	2011	Best Supporting Actor	Andie Chen	Nominated	
