= Black Rose (Singaporean TV series) =

- 爆料黑玫瑰
- Genre: Comedy-satire
- Starring: Guo Liang; Quan Yi Fong; Michelle Chong; Dennis Chew; Marcus Chin; Kym Ng
- Country of origin: Singapore
- Original language: Chinese
- No. of episodes: 26

Production
- Running time: approx. 45 minutes

Original release
- Network: Mediacorp Channel 8
- Release: 2 March 2010 – 30 June 2014

Black Rose (爆料黑玫瑰) is a MediaCorp Channel 8 Chinese language comedy-satire variety show. It is a remake of the Taiwanese show Celebrity Imitated Show (全民最大黨) and features various MediaCorp artistes acting as different characters with parodic mannerisms and names. Personalities and characters spoofed are often well-known figures in the Chinese language entertainment industry.

The show takes the format of a talk show, with one of the regular cast members or a guest star taking the role as host. The host holds a black rose and introduces the six other personalities one by one.

Five cast members made a guest appearance at the Star Search 2010 Grand Finals during the Q & A segment. It was hosted by Chew Chor Meng and featured some of their well-known characters.

The show returned for a second season on 7 April 2014. Michelle Chong did not return in this season, and her place was taken over by Vivian Lai.

== Cast ==
=== Regular cast ===
- Guo Liang
- Quan Yi Fong
- Marcus Chin
- Dennis Chew
- Michelle Chong (season 1)
- Kym Ng
- Vivian Lai (season 2)

=== Guests ===
- Dasmond Koh (host, season 2)
- Chen Hanwei
- Lee Teng
- Henry Thia
- Ben Yeo
- Jeremy Chan
- Jeffrey Xu
- Brandon Wong

== Personalities spoofed ==
- Edison Chen and the 2008 photo scandal
- Kym Ng
- Rui En
- Chen Hanwei
- Kumar
- Yueniang (Jeanette Aw) and Liu Yidao (Yao Wenlong) from The Little Nyonya
- Genie (Fiona Xie) from My Genie
- Phua Chu Kang (Gurmit Singh)
- Confucius
- Nezha
- S.H.E
- Pauline Lan
- Tsai Chin
- The Little Tigers
- Chang Fei
- Fei Yu-ching
- Chow Yun-fat
- The "Na'vi" from Avatar
- Oprah Winfrey
- Jackie Chan
- Angelina Jolie
- Ris Low

== Accolades ==
Organisation	Year	Category	Nominee(s)	Result	Ref
Star Awards	2011	Best Variety Show Host	Guo Liang	Nominated	
Star Awards	2011	Best Variety Show Host	Michelle Chong	Nominated	
Star Awards	2011	Best Costume Designer	Xu Yingying	Nominated	
Star Awards	2011	Favourite Male Character	"Zhang Fei" (portrayed by Guo Liang)	Nominated	
Star Awards	2011	Favourite Female Character	"Yao Yao" (portrayed by Quan Yi Fong)	Nominated	
Star Awards	2011	Favourite Female Character	"Xie Yu Yu" (portrayed by Michelle Chong)	Nominated	
Asian Television Awards	2014	Best Comedy Performance	Quan Yi Fong	Nominated	
Asian Television Awards	2014	Best Comedy Performance	Guo Liang	Nominated	
