= Housewives' Holiday =

- 煮妇的假期
- Genre: Dramedy; Family; Comedy
- Created by: Cynthia Chong 张湄纭; Freddy Leow 廖明利
- Starring: Hong Huifang; Ann Kok; Xiang Yun; Brandon Wong; Yao Wenlong; Rayson Tan
- Opening theme: 休止符 by 刘慧祺
- Country of origin: Singapore
- Original language: Chinese
- No. of episodes: 20

Production
- Producer: Lin Mingzhe 林明哲
- Running time: approx. 45 minutes per episode

Original release
- Network: MediaCorp Channel 8
- Release: 4 March – 31 March 2009

Related
- Precious Babes (2010)

Housewives' Holiday (Chinese: 煮妇的假期) is a Singaporean Chinese drama, which was telecasted on Singapore's free-to-air channel, MediaCorp Channel 8. It stars Hong Huifang, Ann Kok, Xiang Yun, Brandon Wong, Yao Wenlong and Rayson Tan as the casts of the series. This drama serial consists of 20 episodes, and was screened on every weekday night at 9:00 pm.

== Cast ==
- Hong Huifang as Chen Simei (陈思美):
  One of the three wives in the series, Hong portrayed the wife of Chen Weibin who is a former actor and currently a taxi driver. A thrifty wife who works as a scrap collector and a part time maid.
- Ann Kok as Alice Zeng (曾慧贤):
  Kok acts as Alice Zeng who is married to Zhang Jiasheng. She is part of the trio of wives and is a modern housewife who likes to look good. She is also materialistic and like to show off.
- Xiang Yun acts as Zhong Aiqin (钟爱琴):
  Yun acts as the Wife of Brian He and is a Mother of two. She is Best friend of Chen Simei and Alice Zeng. She is a very cowardly housewife who often worries for nothing and Her worries came true when she realised her husband is having an affair.
- Brandon Wong as Chen Weibin (陈伟斌):
  Husband of Chen Simei, Chen was a popular and famous actor and currently works as a taxi driver and loves to gamble.
- Yao Wenlong as Zhang Jiasheng (张家盛):
  Yao acts as Zhang Jiasheng who is the husband of Zeng. Zhang works as an engineer and is a filial son who would ask his wife, Zeng, to give in to his mother. He had an affair with a Chinese lady.
- Wang Xiuyun as Liu Lianhua (刘莲花):
  Liu acts as Mother of Zhang Jiasheng and the Mother-in-law of Alice Zeng. She is friends with Huang Xiaoling and Pan Xiuhui.
- Rayson Tan acts as Brian He (何龙威):
  Tan acts as Husband of Zhong Aiqin and A salesman at OTO who sells massage chairs. He Stays together with his parents so that he can live off his parents' savings and Realised his marriage life is extremely bland then He later had an extra-marital affair with Wendy.
- Joey Swee acts as Wendy:
  She is a Lady boss of a pub and start a Third-party relationship with Brian He.

== Reception ==
The reception for the series was excellent, garnering peak points of 23.4%. This serial is the highest rated drama series for 2009. Average viewership for each episode is 1,076,000.

The three lead actresses of the show - Ann Kok, Hong Huifang and Xiang Yun have gained much audience applause for their wonderful performance. Ann Kok was deemed by the viewing audience as putting up the best performance and having the most breakthrough.

== Accolades ==
| Organisation | Year | Category | Nominees | Result | Ref. |
|---|---|---|---|---|---|
| Star Awards | 2010 | Best Screenplay | Freddy Leow and Cynthia Chong | Nominated | |
| Star Awards | 2010 | Best Actor | Brandon Wong | Nominated | |
| Star Awards | 2010 | Best Actress | Ann Kok | Nominated | |
| Star Awards | 2010 | Best Actress | Hong Huifang | Nominated | |
| Star Awards | 2010 | Best Drama Serial | —N/a | Nominated | |
| Star Awards | 2010 | Top Rated Drama Series | —N/a | Won | |

== See also ==
- List of Housewives' Holiday Episodes
