= Ann Kok =

Singaporean actress (born 1973)

- Born: 11 January 1973 (age 53); Singapore
- Other name: Guo Shuxian
- Education: Mayflower Secondary School
- Occupations: Actress; businesswoman; singer
- Years active: 1993-present
- Musical career
- Genres: Mandopop
- Instrument: Vocals
- Labels: Hype Records; Warner Music Taiwan

Chinese name
- Traditional Chinese: 郭舒賢
- Simplified Chinese: 郭舒贤
- Hanyu Pinyin: Guō Shūxián
- Jyutping: Gwok3 Syu1 Jin4
- Hokkien POJ: Koeh Su-hiân
- Tâi-lô: Kueh Su-hiân

Ann Kok (born 11 January 1973) is a Singaporean businesswoman, singer and an actress who film on an ad-hoc basis.

During the 1990s, Kok was ranked the "Third Ah Jie" by the local media, which defined her as the third most prominent actress in Singapore's Chinese-language entertainment industry of that time, after Zoe Tay and Fann Wong. From 1995 to 1999, Kok won five consecutive Star Awards for Top 10 Most Popular Female Artistes.

In 2024, Kok was awarded with the Star Awards for All-Time Favourite Artiste after winning the Star Awards for Top 10 Most Popular Female Artistes ten times.

== Early life ==
Kok is the youngest child of a family of six children. She has two sisters and three brothers.

== Career ==
=== Rise to prominence ===
Kok started her acting career in 1993 after emerging as a finalist in the local talent-search competition Star Search, where she won a contract to work on Chinese-language TV channel SBC 8 (now MediaCorp Channel 8).

During the 1990s, Kok played lead roles in numerous television series, and her popularity soared during that period. She was ranked the "Third Ah Jie" by the local media, which defined her as the third most prominent actress in Singapore's Chinese-language entertainment industry of that time, after Zoe Tay and Fann Wong. From 1995 to 1999, Kok won five consecutive Star Awards for Top 10 Most Popular Female Artistes.

During that period, Kok also released three solo albums.

In 2000 at the height of her popularity, Kok ventured overseas to expand her acting career.

=== Return to Singapore ===
Kok's overseas career path proved rough, and she returned to Singapore to join the now-defunct MediaWorks in 2003 and later MediaCorp in 2005. Upon her return to Singapore, Kok was often relegated to supporting roles.

Kok made her comeback when she earned rave reviews for her performance as Jiang Ruqing in Love Concierge. That role scored her a nomination for the Star Awards for Best Actress in the Star Awards 2006, her first acting nomination in her 13-year-long career.

Since then, Kok has established herself as an acclaimed actress. In 2009, she played the lead role Alice Zeng, a materialistic and show-off housewife, in the highly acclaimed drama series Housewives' Holiday, which won her praise and positive reviews from audiences. For her performance, Kok was nominated for the Best Actress Award again in the Star Awards 2010 and was the hot favourite, but missed the award. That same year, Kok made her stage debut singing live at The Peranakan Ball for The Little Nyonya musical.

In 2011, Kok made another appearance in Kampong Ties, which was filmed in Sungai Lembing, Malaysia, for a period of 4 months. In the same year, Kok also appeared in The Oath and Bountiful Blessings, starring alongside established actors such as Christopher Lee, Tay Ping Hui and Hong Kong actress Jessica Hsuan.

In 2011, Kok won her sixth Star Awards for Top 10 Most Popular Female Artistes at the Star Awards 2013, her first popularity award since 1999.

In 2012, Kok became the first actress in Asia to snag two nominations in the same category since the inception of the Asian Television Awards (ATA) in 1994. Kok was nominated for the Best Actress in a Leading Role award for her performances in Kampong Ties and Show Hand for ATA 2012. Results would be announced in December 2012.

In 2013, Kok won Top 10 Most Popular Female Artistes in Star Awards 2013. She also walked away with "BottomSlim Sexiest Legs" Award for Star Awards 2012 Walk of Fame. At the Star Awards 2013, Kok was nominated in Favourite Female Character, Favourite On-screen Couple (Drama), BottomSlim Sexiest Legs Award, Top 10 Most Popular Female Artistes.

In March 2014, Kok left Mediacorp. As she chose not to renew her contract, she was deemed ineligible to participate in Star Awards in that year. Her last television series before her contract ended was In the Name of Love. In the same year, she appeared on the big screen with her debut appearance in local film, The Filial Party.

In 2015, after almost a year's break from acting, she acted as Deng Xue Li in Crescendo, produced by Wawa Pictures.

In April 2016, she played the lead role in Toggle.sg original 4-episode psychological thriller mini-series Trapped Minds. In the same year, she did a musical as Hua Mulan's elder sister, Hua Mulish. The original comedy with a twist Mulan The Musical took place in Resorts World Sentosa from 16 December 2016 to 5 February 2017, with the famous troop from Taiwan. They broke record by performing 36 shows in 2 months in Singapore.

In 2024, Kok was awarded with the Star Awards for All-Time Favourite Artiste after winning her tenth Star Awards for Top 10 Most Popular Female Artistes in 2023 at the age of 50.

== Ventures ==
Kok partnered with actress Jesseca Liu to open a retail shop selling bags and accessories in Joo Chiat. The shop, named BFF Zakka, closed in 2014 when the rental contract was due.

In 2017, Kok opened a castella cake shop, named Harmony Bakery, at KSL City mall in Johor Bahru. It shuttered in 2019.

== Personal life ==
Kok changed her Chinese name 郭淑贤 to 郭淑娴 and later officially change it to 郭舒贤. The pronunciation remains the same but the Chinese character had changed.

== Filmography ==
=== Film ===
| Year | Title | Role | Notes | Ref |
|---|---|---|---|---|
| 1994 | Men on the Edge (帮会1889) | | Telemovie | |
| 1996 | Heart of the Family (家有一宝) | | Telemovie | |

=== Television series ===
| Year | Title | Role | Notes | Ref |
|---|---|---|---|---|
| 1994 | The Young Ones (壯志奥阳) | | | |
| 1994 | The Valiant One (昆伦奴) | Zhang Ying | | |
| 1995 | Coffee or Tea (是非屋) | | | |
| 1995 | Heartbeat (医胆仁心) | | | |
| 1995 | Heavenly Ghost (天师钟道) | Liu Yeqin | | |
| 1995 | The Morning Express (阳光列车) | | | |
| 1995 | The Morning Express II (阳光列车) | | | |
| 1996 | Legend of the White Hair Brides | Nalan Minghui | | |
| 1996 | The Legends of Jigong | Yue Yinping / Li Xiaomei | | |
| 1996 | The Night is Young (美丽夜女郎) | | | |
| 1997 | Curtain Call (大鑼大鼓) | | | |
| 1997 | Courting Trouble (婚姻法庭) | | | |
| 1997 | The Guest People | Juxiang | | |
| 1998 | Facing the Music | Yu Kaidi | | |
| 1998 | Dreams (七个不道德的梦) | | | |
| 1998 | Riding the Storm (陌生人) | | | |
| 1999 | Wok of Life | Saiman / Yue'e | | |
| 2000 | The Tax Files (流金锐月) | Yuki | | |
| 2000 | Dare to Strike (扫冰者) | | | |
| 2002 | No.8 Bus (八号巴士) | | | |
| 2002 | Venus (维纳斯) | | | |
| 2002 | Venture Against Time (子是故人來) | Young Shi Caiyu | | |
| 2002 | Just in Time for the Wedding (一切从结婚开始) | | | |
| 2003 | OK No Problem (OK沒问题) | | | |
| 2004 | Money No Problem (恭喜发财) | | | |
| 2004 | Be Somebody (海军) | | | |
| 2004 | Changing Lanes (易心人) | | | |
| 2004 | Zero | | | |
| 2005 | A New Life | Guo Jialing | | |
| 2005 | Love Concierge (爱的掌門人) | Jiang Ruqing | | |
| 2006 | Family Matters | | | |
| 2007 | The Peak | Xiuping | | |
| 2007 | Kinship | Zheng Yinsha | | |
| 2008 | La Femme | Lin Xiuhui | | |
| 2008 | My Destiny (幸福满贯) | | | |
| 2009 | Housewives' Holiday | Alice Zeng Huixian | | |
| 2009 | My School Daze | Kang Qiaozhen | | |
| 2009 | Daddy at Home | Yang Xinbei | | |
| 2010 | Happy Family | Dong Shuixing | | |
| 2010 | The Illusionist (魔幻世界) | Shayne Yang | | |
| 2010 | Precious Babes | Lin Huixian | | |
| 2010 | The Family Court | Zheng Danni | | |
| 2011 | Bountiful Blessings | Liang Pinhong | | |
| 2011 | Kampong Ties | Feng Yueman | | |
| 2011 | The Oath | Ye Zhiyi | | |
| 2012 | Show Hand (注定) | Xu Shumin | | |
| 2012 | It Takes Two | Vivian | | |
| 2014 | Soup of Life | Lin Fang | | |
| 2014 | In the Name of Love | Song Chuyun | | |
| 2015 | Angry Feat (不爽投诉站) | Wang Meiqi | | |
| 2015 | Crescendo | Shirley Deng Xueli | | |
| 2016 | Trapped Minds (心魔) | Yan Yuru | | |
| 2018 | Missing | Anne | | |
| 2018 | Doppelganger | Wang Jingyi | | |
| 2018 | Till We Meet Again - Prequel (千年来说对不起-前传) | Nine-Tailed Fox | | |
| 2018 | Till We Meet Again (千年来说对不起) | Nine-Tailed Fox | | |
| 2018 | Magic Chef (料理人生) | Yan Mei | | |
| 2019 | Hello From The Other Side (阴错阳差) | Sai Jiao | | |
| 2022 | Healing Heroes (医生不是神) | Hong Shufen | | |

== Discography ==
=== Studio albums ===
| Year | Title | Notes | Ref |
|---|---|---|---|
| 1997 | 记得我的样子 | | |
| 1998 | 爱情点心 | | |
| 2000 | 享受现在 | | |

== Theatre ==
| Year | Title | Notes |
|---|---|---|
| 2009 | The Peranakan Ball (娘惹之恋) | |
| December 2016- February 2017 | Mulan The Musical (木蘭少女) | Hua Mulian 花木蓮 |

== Awards and nominations ==
| Organisation | Year | Category | Nominated work | Result | Ref |
|---|---|---|---|---|---|
| Star Awards | 1995 | Top 10 Most Popular Female Artistes | —N/a | Won | |
| Star Awards | 1996 | Top 10 Most Popular Female Artistes | —N/a | Won | |
| Star Awards | Star Awards | Top 10 Most Popular Female Artistes | —N/a | Won | |
| Star Awards | 1998 | Top 10 Most Popular Female Artistes | —N/a | Won | |
| Star Awards | 1999 | Top 10 Most Popular Female Artistes | —N/a | Won | |
| Star Awards | 2006 | Best Actress | Love Concierge (as Jiang Ruqing) | Nominated | |
| Star Awards | 2010 | Best Actress | Housewives' Holiday (as Zeng Huixian Alice) | Nominated | |
| Star Awards | 2010 | Top 10 Most Popular Female Artistes | —N/a | Nominated | |
| Star Awards | 2011 | Best Supporting Actress | The Family Court (as Zheng Danni) | Nominated | |
| Star Awards | 2011 | Top 10 Most Popular Female Artistes | —N/a | Won | |
| Star Awards | 2012 | Best Actress | Bountiful Blessings (as Liang Pinhong) | Nominated | |
| Star Awards | 2012 | Top 10 Most Popular Female Artistes | —N/a | Won | |
| Star Awards | 2013 | Top 10 Most Popular Female Artistes | —N/a | Won | |
| Star Awards | 2013 | Favourite Female Character | —N/a | Nominated | |
| Star Awards | 2013 | Bottom Slim Sexiest Legs Award | —N/a | Won | |
| Star Awards | 2021 | Top 10 Most Popular Female Artistes | —N/a | Won | |
| Star Awards | 2023 | Top 10 Most Popular Female Artistes | —N/a | Won | |
| Star Awards | 2024 | All-Time Favourite Artiste | —N/a | Won | |
| Asian Television Awards | 2012 | Best Actress in a Supporting Role | Kampong Ties (as Feng Yueman) | Nominated | |
| Asian Television Awards | 2012 | Best Actress in a Supporting Role | Show Hand | Nominated | |
