= Tong Bing Yu =

Malaysian actress and singer

- 童缤毓
- Born: Cheras, Kuala Lumpur, Malaysia
- Education: UCSI University Music Programmes
- Occupations: Actress, singer, host
- Years active: 2008–present
- Musical career
- Instruments: Piano, drums
- Website: www.facebook.com/TongBingYu

Tong Bing Yu (formerly known as Chris Tong; simplified Chinese: 童缤毓; traditional Chinese: 童繽毓; pinyin: Tóng Bīnyù; Jyutping: Tung4 Ban1 Juk1) is a Malaysian actress, host, singer, and producer.

In 2014, Tong Bing Yu was awarded one of Malaysia's Top Ten Outstanding Youth. She is a long-term sponsor of "Ali De Speranza", a World Vision 30-Hour Famine D.I.Y Camp.

== Career ==
=== Early years ===
In 2006, Tong won title of Miss Malaysia Chinese Cosmos International, along with two subsidiary titles, Miss Personality and Miss Perfect Skin. She later represented Malaysia in Switzerland and China, where she received the Miss Culture Personality Award.

In 2007, she founded the Yumiao Love Charity Foundation, encouraging pageant candidates to engage in charitable activities.

She landed her first TV hosting role in a China-Malaysia Jiangsu TV Travelogue, Go Go Travel. The show introduced places of interest and food of both China and Malaysia. Her co-hosts were Taiwanese host Chen Hong, Shining Star Performing Arts Training Center student Allan Kew, and TV anchor Huang Jing of China Jiangsu Broadcasting Corporation.

In 2008, she participated in her first TV series, My Destiny, marking the beginning of her acting career. The following year, she secured her first leading role in The Adjusters.

In 2009, she began serving as an emcee for Hai-O and Sin Chew Daily's co-organized charity event "Ai Hua Jiao". She continued in this role for 10 years until the event was suspended due to the COVID-19 pandemic.

=== Singapore ===
In 2010, Tong got her first leading role in Singapore in the TV series The Family Court. The role got her nominated in the 17th Star Awards Ceremony in Singapore, along with Tay Ping Hui in the Favourite Onscreen Couple (Drama) category. Also in 2010, she co-hosted Dream Potters with Singapore artiste Lee Teng, and was nominated for Favourite Onscreen Partners (Variety) at the 17th Star Awards Ceremony in 2011.

In 2012, she was nominated for Best Actress and Most Popular Actress at the second Golden Awards in Malaysia through the TV series A Time to Embrace.

In 2014, she got her first Best Actress nomination through the role of Bai Mingzhu (TV Series The Journey: A Voyage), at the 20th Star Awards Ceremony and won her first award - Top 10 Most Popular Female Artistes in Singapore. The same year, she won the Top 5 Most Popular Actress at the third Golden Awards in Malaysia, making Tong the only winner of both popularity awards among female artiste in Singapore and Malaysia.

Furthermore, she was also selected as one of Malaysia's Top Ten Outstanding Youth, and the winner of Outstanding Female Artiste of McMillan Woods Global Awards in 2014.

In 2017, she performed as "mistress" in the Mightiest Mother-in-Law.

=== Theatre and China film industry ===
Tong was also involved in theatre performances in 2015 and participated in the famous stage play Malaysian version, playing the role of Feng Ping. In 2011, she also made a cameo in the stage play of The Legends of Lai Meng. In the same year, she got two movie roles. The Wedding Diary, which gave her the opportunity to act alongside local artiste Ah Niu and Hong Kong actress Elanne Kong. Also, she participated in the movie Petaling Street Warriors with Mark Lee and Yeo Yann Yann.

Later, she participated in the China web movie League of Legend, playing the role of LeBlanc, acting with Elanne Kong, Tony Ahn and Collin Chou; she then officially announced she will gradually shift her focus to China, becoming one of the artiste of Beijing Happywoods TV under Hunan Television.

=== Involvement in production and film producing ===
In 2015, Tong was the administrative producer for the Hong Kong movie Undercover: Punch and Gun.

In 2016, became producer of Hunan Broadcasting System and Malaysia Mon Space Media Entertainment co-produced China web drama Utopia, while acting in it too.

In 2018, she starred in a China-Malaysia film, and sang the movie's theme song A Stolen Life. This won her Breakthrough Performing Actress in the 2018 14th Chinese American Film Festival and was awarded Best Lead Actress in the 2020 Melbourne Indie Film Festival, which is also her first "Best Actress" win.

In 2019, Tong founded Marvelous Culture & Film, based in Malaysia. She started collaborations with China as the producer of Beyond Life and Death. In the past six years, she led her company's strategic transformation to achieve growth through cooperation with China.

== Filmography ==
=== Television ===
Year	Title	Role	Notes	Ref
2009	Romantic Delicacies	Honey		
2009	The Adjusters稽查專用	Annie 洛安妮		
2009	Welcome Home, My Love	Zhang Wanqin 张婉琴		
2009	My Destiny	Bai Suzhen 白素真		
2010	Injustice	Zhao Yutian 赵语恬		
2010	Goodnight DJ 2 声空感应2			
2010	Glowing Embers	Xuan Hui 玄蕙		
2010	The Glittering Days	Bo Li		
2010	The Family Court	Huang Shuya 黄舒雅		
2011	Code of Honour	Long Wanyi 龙婉怡		
2011	C.L.I.F.	Zhang Cenglin 张岑琳		
2012	Justice in the City	Zhuo Huiqi 卓惠棋		
2012	Game Plan	Guo Keli 郭可丽		
2013	The Journey: A Voyage	Bai Mingzhu 白明珠		
2013	96 °C Café 96 °C 咖啡	Xu Ruolin 徐若琳		
2014	The Journey: Tumultuous Times	Bai Mingzhu 白明珠		
2014	The Caregivers	Fang Yiting 方仪婷		
2015	Good Luck	Lin Shihui 林世慧		
2016	Peace & Prosperity	Huang Zishan 黄子珊		
2016	Beyond Words	Liang Lening 梁乐宁		
2016	House of Fortune	Luo Shuping 罗舒萍		
2017	Life Less Ordinary	Zhou Ke'en 周可恩		
2017	Mightiest Mother-in-Law	Zhou Ke'en 周可恩		
2018	Gifted	Su Lingli 苏伶俐		
2019	Heavenly Sword and Dragon Slaying Sabre	Bright Moon Messenger 辉月使	Cameo	
2019	One Boat, One World 海洋之城			
2021	The Ferryman: Legends of Nanyang 灵魂摆渡·南洋传说	Bai Xue Ying 白晓雪		

=== Films ===
Year	Title	Role	Notes	Ref
2011	Petaling Street Warriors	Xiao Ju 小菊		
2012	The Golden Couple 金童玉女			
2012	The Wedding Diary	Pat		
2012	The Golden Couple 金童玉女	Miss Woo		
2013	Kick Ass Girls 爆3俏嬌娃	Zhu Ge 诸葛		
2014	League of Legend 王者联盟	LeBlanc 乐芙兰	Web movie	
2015	冷月刀	Chang Qiuyan 常秋嫣		
2016	Special Female Force	Iris		
2016	The Guest 不速之客	Liu Wen 刘雯		
2018	A Stolen Life 双生	Chen Ji/Chen Mo 陈寂/陈默		
2019	Supermum		Cameo	
2025	Blood Brothers	Madam Rita		
TBD	枪口下	Yi Xiao Ling 易小玲	Filming	
TBD	JanGo	Cody	Post-production	

=== Stage play ===
Year	Title	Role	Notes	Ref
2011	The Legends of Lai Meng 杜鹃花的黎明			
2015	I Have a Date with Spring		Musical, Malaysia leg of tour	

== Hosting ==
- 988 DJ (乐活星期天)
- Jiangsu TV Go Go Travel (Travel Program) 2006
- Pink World (Informative Program)
- Jia Yu Channel (Model Contest)
- Mid-Autumn Festival Special
- Hit Hot Song 2
- Dream Potters
- Ai Hua Jiao Charity Concert 2009

== Discography ==
- 《不要骗小孩》EP Single Duet with A Di
- 《筑梦》 TV Series A Time to Embrace Original Soundtrack Duet with Henley Hii
- 《我们都一样》TV Series A Time to Embrace Original Soundtrack Duet with Lawrence Wong and Henley Hii
- The Legend of Lai Meng Musical Theme Song Duet with Lenny Ooi
- A Stolen Life Theme Song

== Awards and nomination ==
Year	Ceremony	Category	Nominated work	Result	Ref
2010	<Nuyuo> Walk of Style	Top 10 Fashion Icon	—N/a	Won	
2011	Star Awards	Favourite Onscreen Couple (Drama)	The Family Court	Nominated	
2011	Star Awards	Favourite Onscreen Partners (Variety)	Dream Potters	Nominated	
2012	Golden Awards	Most Popular Actress	—N/a	Nominated	
2012	Golden Awards	Best Actress	A Time to Embrace	Nominated	
2014	Golden Awards	Most Popular Actress (Top 5)	—N/a	Won	
2014	Golden Awards	Best Actress	Mining Magnate	Nominated	
2014	McMillan Woods Global Awards	Outstanding Female Artiste	—N/a	Won	
2014	Star Awards	Top 10 Most Popular Female Artistes	—N/a	Won	
2014	Star Awards	Star Awards for Most Popular Regional Artiste (Malaysia)	—N/a	Nominated	
2014	Star Awards	Best Actress	The Journey: A Voyage	Nominated	
2014	Junior Chamber International Malaysia	Malaysia's Top Ten Outstanding Youth	—N/a	Won	
2015	Asia Model Awards	Asian Model Star Awards	—N/a	Won	
2015	Star Awards	Top 10 Most Popular Female Artistes	—N/a	Nominated	
2015	Star Awards	Most Popular Regional Artiste (Malaysia)	—N/a	Nominated	
2016	Star Awards	Top 10 Most Popular Female Artistes	—N/a	Nominated	
2017	Star Awards	Top 10 Most Popular Female Artistes	—N/a	Won	
2018	Chinese American Film Festival	Breakthrough Performing Actress	A Stolen Life	Won	
2019	ASEAN Outstanding Business Award	ASEAN Top Social Media Influencer Award	—N/a	Won	
2020	Melbourne Indie Film Festival	Best Lead Actress	A Stolen Life	Won	
2021	Malaysia Fashion, Modeling & Pageant Awards	People's Choice Award – Outstanding Actress of the Year	—N/a	Won	
