= KSL City =

Shopping mall in Johor Bahru, Johor, Malaysia

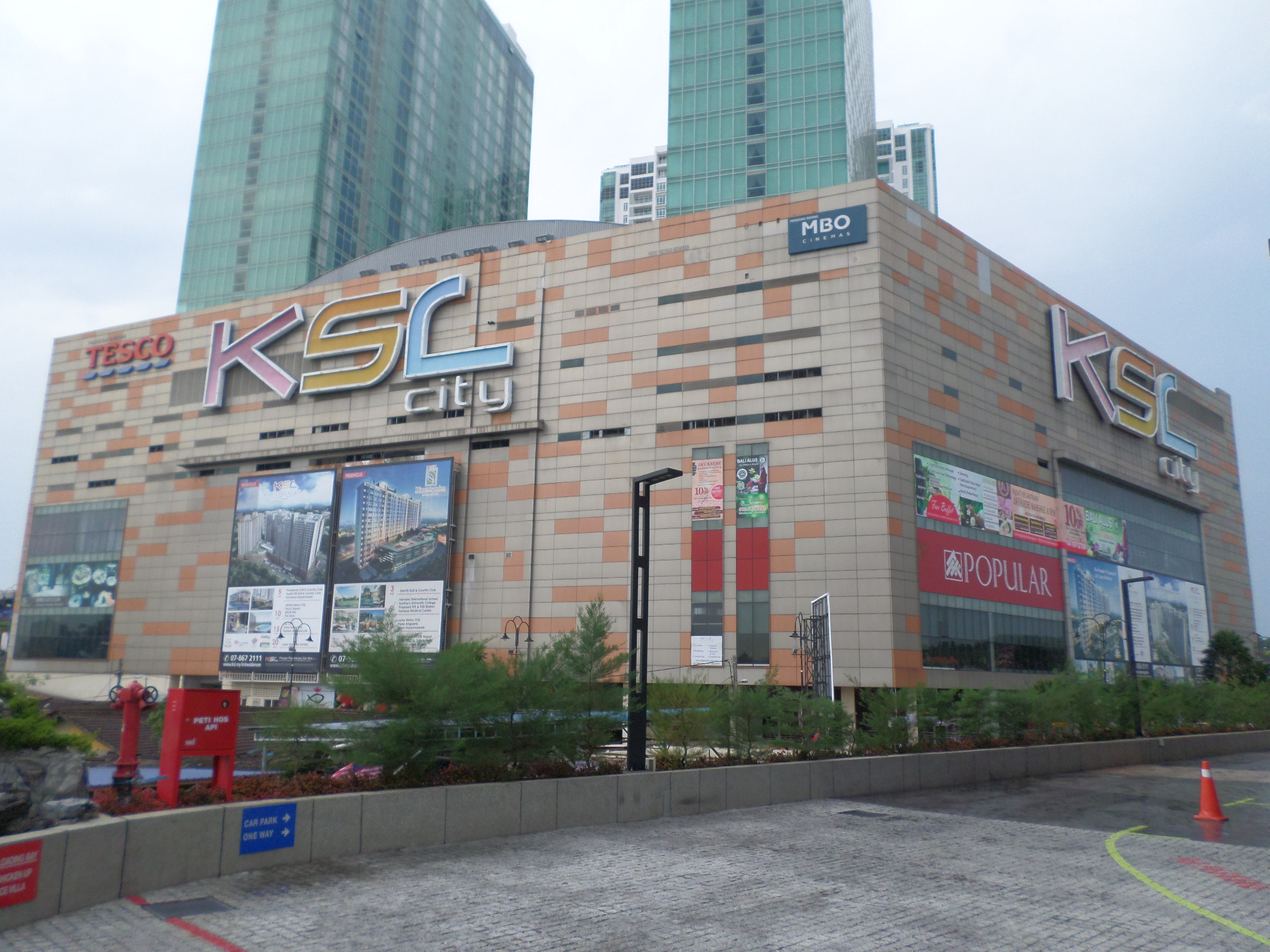
- Coordinates: 1°29′08″N 103°45′44″E
- Address: Johor Bahru, Johor, Malaysia
- Opened: December 12, 2010
- Owner: KSL Holdings Bhd.
- Floors: 7
- Parking: 2,800 car parks

KSL City is an integrated shopping mall development in Taman Abad, Johor Bahru, Johor, Malaysia.

== History ==
The shopping mall was opened on 12 December 2010.

== Architecture ==
The complex comprises a shopping mall and two identical towers of KSL Resort Hotel. The shopping mall consists of 500 retail outlets, a theater and a water theme park, while the two towers consists of 904 hotel rooms and 602 condominiums, and include 2,800 car parks. Its net leasing area is 55,742 km^{2}.

== Business ==
The shopping mall was developed by KSL Holdings Bhd. under its property investment division.

== Transportation ==
The shopping mall is accessible by Causeway Link bus route J100.

== See also ==
- List of shopping malls in Malaysia
