= Breakout (Singaporean TV series) =

- 破天网
- Genre: Thriller; Action; Revenge
- Created by: Ang Eng Tee 洪荣狄
- Written by: Ang Eng Tee 洪荣狄
- Directed by: Chong Liung Man 张龙敏; Loh Woon Woon 罗温温 方傢福 Png Keh Hock
- Starring: Jeanette Aw; Elvin Ng; Zhou Ying; Christopher Lee; Dai Xiangyu; Guo Liang
- Opening theme: 网 (The Web) by Jeff Chang
- Ending theme: 网 (The Web) by Jeff Chang
- Country of origin: Singapore
- Original language: Chinese
- No. of episodes: 25

Production
- Producer: Winnie Wong 王尤红
- Running time: approx. 45 minutes per episode

Original release
- Network: MediaCorp Channel 8
- Release: 6 December 2010 – 7 January 2011

Related
- Mrs P.I.; Prosperity

Breakout (Chinese: 破天网) is a Singaporean Chinese drama television series which was broadcast on Singapore's free-to-air channel, MediaCorp Channel 8. The series starred Jeanette Aw, Elvin Ng, Zhou Ying, Christopher Lee, Dai Xiangyu and Guo Liang. It debuted on 6 December 2010 and ended on 7 January 2011.

It won Best Drama Serial at the 2011 Star Awards.

The drama was encored from 30 November 2011 to 3 January 2012 at midnight, from 28 September 2022 to 25 October 2022 Tue to Sat 12AM, and was now rated as PG for violence.

== Cast ==
=== Yang family ===
- Jeanette Aw
  - as Ye Ziqing 叶子青, Yang Tianwei's wife
  - as Yang Nianqing 杨念青, Yang Tianwei's daughter
- Guo Liang as Yang Tianwei 杨天威
- Dai Xiangyu as Chris Yang Zhenfeng 杨振锋
  - Jerald Tan 陈杰乐 as a young Chris Yang Zhenfeng

=== Tang family ===
Artiste	Character	Description
Zheng Geping 郑各评	Tang Yaozu 汤耀祖	Tang Ying's father Murdered by car accident
Regene Lim 林咏谊	Tang Ying 汤颖	Younger (episodes 1)
Zhou Ying 周颖	Tang Ying 汤颖	Older
Liu Yu 刘羽	Tang Kai 汤凯	Tang Ying's brother (episode 1); Killed in the car accident
Yan Bingliang 严丙量	Tang Yaozong	Tang Ying's uncle Tang Yaozu's older brother Severed all relations with Tang Ying

=== Zou Jieming's family ===
Artiste	Character	Description
Elvin Ng 黄俊雄	Zou Jieming 邹杰明	Bai Huahua's son Xu Changgen's step-son Xu Chunli's step-brother Has autism, but is highly intelligent Shot by Yang Zhenfeng while saving Tang Ying in episode 25, succumbed to his injuries.
Lin Meijiao 林梅娇	Bai Huahua 白花花	Zou Jieming and Xu Chunli's mother Bee hoon stall owner
Bryan Chan 陈国华	Xu Changgen 许长根	Bai Huahua's husband Zou Jieming's stepfather Xu Chunli's father Ex-gambling addict
Ya Hui 雅慧	Xu Chunli 许春丽	Xu Changgen and Bai Huahua's daughter Zou jieming's step-sister

=== Other characters ===
Artiste	Character	Description
Christopher Lee 李铭顺	Situ Dongcheng 司徒东城	Former lawyer ruined by Yang Zhenfeng; Released from prison in episode 2 Nianqing's lover Shot and killed Yang Zhenfeng in Episode 25; Drowned together with Yang Nianqing in Episode 25 (Deceased- Episode 25)
Pan Lingling 潘玲玲	Cai Siling 蔡思灵	Yang Tianwei's ex-lover
Desmond Tan 陈泂江	Cai Haoyu 蔡浩宇	Cai Siling's younger brother Dentist
Darren Lim 林明伦	Wang Lianzhou 汪连州	Situ Dongcheng's former colleague and rival
Christina Lim 林佩芬	Fan Meiqi 范美琪	Situ Dongcheng's ex-girlfriend
Belinda Lee 李心钰	Ya Lina 雅丽娜	A witch from the Yiluo tribe
Adam Chen 詹金泉	Alex	Nianqing's ex-boyfriend Undercover Interpol officer Later murdered by Zhenfeng
Richard Low 刘谦益	Jimmy Zhang	Detective hired as a PI to investigate the Yangs' criminal activities
Rebecca Lim 林慧玲	Suying 素英	Zhenfeng's ex-girlfriend who was murdered.
Chen Huihui 陈慧慧	Miss Wong	Tang Ying's nurse
Li Wenhai 李文海	Kun 坤哥	

== Production ==
The drama's title translates to the Technical Analysis term in financial markets, referring to super-villain Yang Tianwei's attempt to trade using that strategy so as to get rich quickly enough to seek revenge for his murdered son rather than wait for justice to be meted out.

== Reception ==
Average viewership for each episode is 866,000.

=== Accolades ===
Organisation	Year	Award	Nominee(s)	Results	Ref
Star Awards	2011	Young Talent Award	Jerald Tan	Nominated	
Star Awards	2011	Best Theme Song	"网" by Jeff Chang	Won	
Star Awards	2011	Best Director	Chong Liung Man	Won	
Star Awards	2011	Best Screenplay	Ang Eng Tee	Nominated	
Star Awards	2011	Best Costume Designer	Xu Yingying	Nominated	
Star Awards	2011	Best Sound/Music Design	Long Soo Ming/Zheng Kaihua	Won	
Star Awards	2011	Best Drama Serial	—N/a	Won	
Star Awards	2011	Top Rated Drama Serial	—N/a	Nominated	
Star Awards	2011	Favourite Male Character	Elvin Ng	Won	
Star Awards	2011	Favourite Female Character	Jeanette Aw	Nominated	
Star Awards	2011	Favourite Female Character	Zhou Ying	Nominated	
Star Awards	2011	Most Favourite On-screen couple	Jeanette Aw and Christopher Lee	Won	
Star Awards	2011	Most Favourite On-screen couple	Elvin Ng and Zhou Ying	Nominated	
Star Awards	2011	Best Supporting Actor	Darren Lim	Nominated	
Star Awards	2011	Best Actor	Christopher Lee	Nominated	
Star Awards	2011	Best Actor	Elvin Ng	Nominated	
Star Awards	2011	Best Actress	Jeanette Aw	Nominated	
Star Awards	2011	Best Actress	Zhou Ying	Nominated	
Star Awards	2011	Best Supporting Actress	Lin Meijiao	Nominated	
Star Awards	2011	Best Supporting Actress	Pan Lingling	Won	
Asian Television Awards	2011	Best Actor	Christopher Lee	Nominated (Highly commended)	
Asian Television Awards	2011	Best Supporting Actress	Pan Lingling	Won	
Asian Television Awards	2011	Best Screenplay	Ang Eng Tee	Nominated (Highly commended)	

== See also ==
- List of programmes broadcast by Mediacorp Channel 8

Preceded by Together; 2009-10	Star Awards for Best Drama Serial; Breakout; 2010-11	Succeeded by On the Fringe; 2011-12
