= The Little Nyonya =

2008 Singaporean drama serial

- Theatrical Poster
- 小娘惹
- Genre: Period drama
- Written by: Ang Eng Tee
- Directed by: Chong Liung Man; Tay Peck Choo; Chia Mien Yang; Loo Yin Kam
- Starring: Jeanette Aw; Qi Yuwu; Pierre Png; Joanne Peh; Eelyn Kok; Ng Hui; Xiang Yun
- Opening theme: 如燕 by Olivia Ong
- Ending theme: 保温 by Bevlyn Khoo 需要 by JS
- Country of origin: Singapore
- Original languages: Mandarin (with partial English, Malay, Japanese and Hokkien)
- No. of episodes: 34

Production
- Producer: Chia Mien Yang
- Running time: approx. 45 minutes

Original release
- Network: MediaCorp TV Channel 8
- Release: 25 November 2008 – 5 January 2009

Related
- Precious (2011); The New Little Nyonya (2020); Emerald Hill - The Little Nyonya Story (2025)

The Little Nyonya (Chinese: 小娘惹) is a 2008 drama serial on Singapore's free-to-air MediaCorp TV Channel 8. It stars Jeanette Aw, Qi Yuwu, Pierre Png, Joanne Peh, Eelyn Kok, Ng Hui and Xiang Yun as the main casts of the series. The storyline, which circles around the biographical flashback of an extended Nyonya (Peranakan Chinese) family in Malacca, Malaysia, is set in the 1930s and spans to over 70 years and several generations of three families.

It debuted on 25 November 2008 and concluded its run on 5 January 2009. It was shown on weekdays at 9 pm. The series was partly sponsored by the Media Development Authority of Singapore.

Produced by MediaCorp to commemorate Channel 8's 45th anniversary, the series was noted for its high viewership and cultural impact. It has been acclaimed by viewers and critics, and ranked the highest viewership in the country in 14 years. The success of this drama series has led to the show being broadcast internationally. In December 2016, the subscription-based streaming service Netflix acquired broadcasting rights for the series.

The series later inspired a 2012 remake titled Precious, a 2020 Chinese adaptation of the same name, and a 2025 sequel titled Emerald Hill - The Little Nyonya Story.

== Plot ==
The story spans 70 years (1930–2000) and follows the struggles and triumphs of two generations of Peranakan women in a patriarchal society, Huang Juxiang (Jeanette Aw) and her daughter Yamamoto Yueniang (Christabelle Tan, Jeanette Aw, and Xiang Yun), (Note: The story follows Yueniang throughout her life, necessitating the portrayal of the character by different actresses at the different stages of her life, with Christabelle Tan play the young Yueniang, Jeanette Aw the youthful to middle aged Yueniang, and Xiang Yun as Yueniang in her later years.) alongside the fates of the people around them.

Huang Juxiang, a beautiful and skilled Nyonya, is mistreated by her wealthy Peranakan family in Malacca due to being an illegitimate daughter and a deaf-mute. She catches the attention of multiple men:

- Chen Sheng (Pierre Png): a kind man who admires her but fails to stand up for her,
- Charlie Zhang (Desmond Sim): a ruthless businessman who wants her as a mistress, and
- Yamamoto Yousuke (Dai Xiangyu): a gentle Japanese photographer who truly loves her.

When her family forces her into marriage with Charlie Zhang for business benefits, Juxiang escapes, only to be kidnapped by traffickers. Yousuke rescues her, and they elope to Singapore where they operate a photography studio. Their happiness is cut short when Yousuke returns to Japan to visit his father and is drafted into the Japanese army during WWII. Juxiang struggles alone, raising their daughter Yueniang with help from Chen Sheng. When Yousuke finally returns after deserting the army, war erupts in Singapore, and both he and Juxiang die, leaving Yueniang orphaned.

Yueniang, mirroring her mother’s beauty and resilience, is taken in by her grandmother Wang Tianlan (Xiang Yun) and her loyal servant Ah Tao (Ng Hui). She learns Peranakan traditions in the house, and faces the same mistreatment her mother endured at the hands of her relatives, especially from Huang Zhenzhu (Eelyn Kok), her cruel and envious elder cousin, Huang Tianbao (Andie Chen), the Huang's only heir and Lin Guihua (Lin Meijiao), who despises her so much, except Huang Yuzhu (Joanne Peh), her kind-hearted younger cousin who suffers due to family expectations.

Yueniang catches the eye of Chen Xi (Qi Yuwu), Chen Sheng’s nephew, who pretends to be a chauffeur to befriend her. They fall in love, but the Huang family plans to marry Chen Xi to one of Yueniang’s cousins. Despite his determination, Chen Xi is tricked into an engagement with Yuzhu, while Yueniang is forced to marry a butcher-turned-gangster, Liu Yidao (Yao Wenlong). Yidao, impressed by Yueniang’s strength, respects her, and they become sworn siblings instead of husband and wife.

Yuzhu however supports Yueniang and Chen Xi being together. She and Chen Xi, who has Chen Sheng's encouragement, help Yueniang to escape her arranged marriage. However, tragedy strikes when Yuzhu is mistaken for Yueniang in the process and raped by Robert Zhang (Zen Chong), Charlie Zhang’s son. In the aftermath, Yuzhu is married off to Robert, who abuses her, driving her to insanity. Meanwhile, Chen Xi is manipulated into marrying the jealous Zhenzhu while he is gravely ill.

Determined to take control of her life, Yueniang refuses to remain a victim. She becomes a successful businesswoman, buys back the Huang ancestral home which has been possessed by the bank due to her uncle's financial mismanagement, and reconciles with her family. Chen Xi, divorced from Zhenzhu, still loves Yueniang but Yueniang refuses to marry him due to societal constraints. He instead started a relationship with his good friend Libby (Pamelyn Chee). Yueniang instead marries a British lawyer, Paul Robertson (Bobby Tonelli), and adopts Yuzhu and Robert’s son, Zhang Zuye (Edsel Lim, and Zen Chong). (Note: Similar to Yueniang's character setup, Zhang Zuye is being presented when he is a young boy and when grown up.) Tianbao, however, was sentenced to death after killing Charlie Zhang, Robert Zhang bribe someone to kill Chen Sheng when on his way back to hotel and Yuzhu was sent to mental hospital due to having traumatic experiences with Robert Zhang's abusive.

In the present, Yueniang’s granddaughter, Angela (Felicia Chin), uncovers their family history and learns that Yuzhu was her biological grandmother. Yueniang, now elderly, passes away peacefully in a traditional white garment, signifying her reunion with Paul in the afterlife.

== Cast ==
=== Huang Family ===
==== First Generation ====
- Yan Bingliang as Huang Yuan (黄元)
- Lin Meijiao as Lin Guihua (林桂花)
- Xiang Yun as Wang Tianlan (王天兰)
- Jeanette Aw as Huang Juxiang (黄菊香)
- Darren Lim as Huang Jincheng (黄金成)
- Apple Hong as Huang Meiyu (黄美玉)
- Pan Lingling as Xiufeng (秀凤)
- Cynthia Koh as Xiujuan (秀娟)

==== Second Generation ====
- Jeanette Aw as Middle-Age Yamamoto Yueniang (山本月娘)
  - Christabelle Tan as Young Yamamoto Yueniang (年轻山本月娘)
  - Xiang Yun as Old Yamamoto Yueniang (老山本月娘)
- Andie Chen as Alexandre Huang Tianbao (黄天宝)
- Eelyn Kok as Helen Huang Zhenzhu (黄珍珠)
- Joanne Peh as Huang Yuzhu (黄玉珠)

==== Third generation ====
- Zhang Zetong as Middle-Age Huang Zuye (黄祖业) in Emerald Hill - The Little Nyonya Story (2025)
  - Edsel Lim as Young Huang Zuye (年轻黄祖业)
  - Zen Chong as Old Huang Zuye (老黄祖业) (Cameo appearance)

==== Fourth Generation ====
- Felicia Chin as Angel (安琦)

=== Chen Family ===
- Li Yinzhu as Madame Chen (陈老太)
- Chen Xiang as Chen Gong (陈功)
- Yang Yanqing as Xiulian (秀莲)
- Pierre Png as Chen Sheng (陈盛)
- Qi Yuwu as Chen Xi (陈锡)

=== Zhang Family ===
- Desmond Sim as Charlie Zhang (查里张)
- Zen Chong as Robert Zhang (罗伯张)
- Henry Heng as Zhang Tianfu (张添福)

=== Other characters ===
- Ng Hui as Ah Tao (阿桃)
  - Zhu Xiufeng as Old Ah Tao (老阿桃)
- Dai Xiangyu as Yamamoto Yousuke
- Yao Wenlong as Liu Yidao (刘一刀)
- Pamelyn Chee as Libby (丽贝儿)
- Nat Ho as Jonathan Li Xiuwen (李修文)
- Li Yuejie as Da Sha (大傻)
- Bobby Tonelli as Paul Robertson
- Jeszlene Zhou as Jinhua (金花)
- Peer Metze as Smith
- Chua Cheng Pou as Hei Gou (黑狗)

== Development and production ==
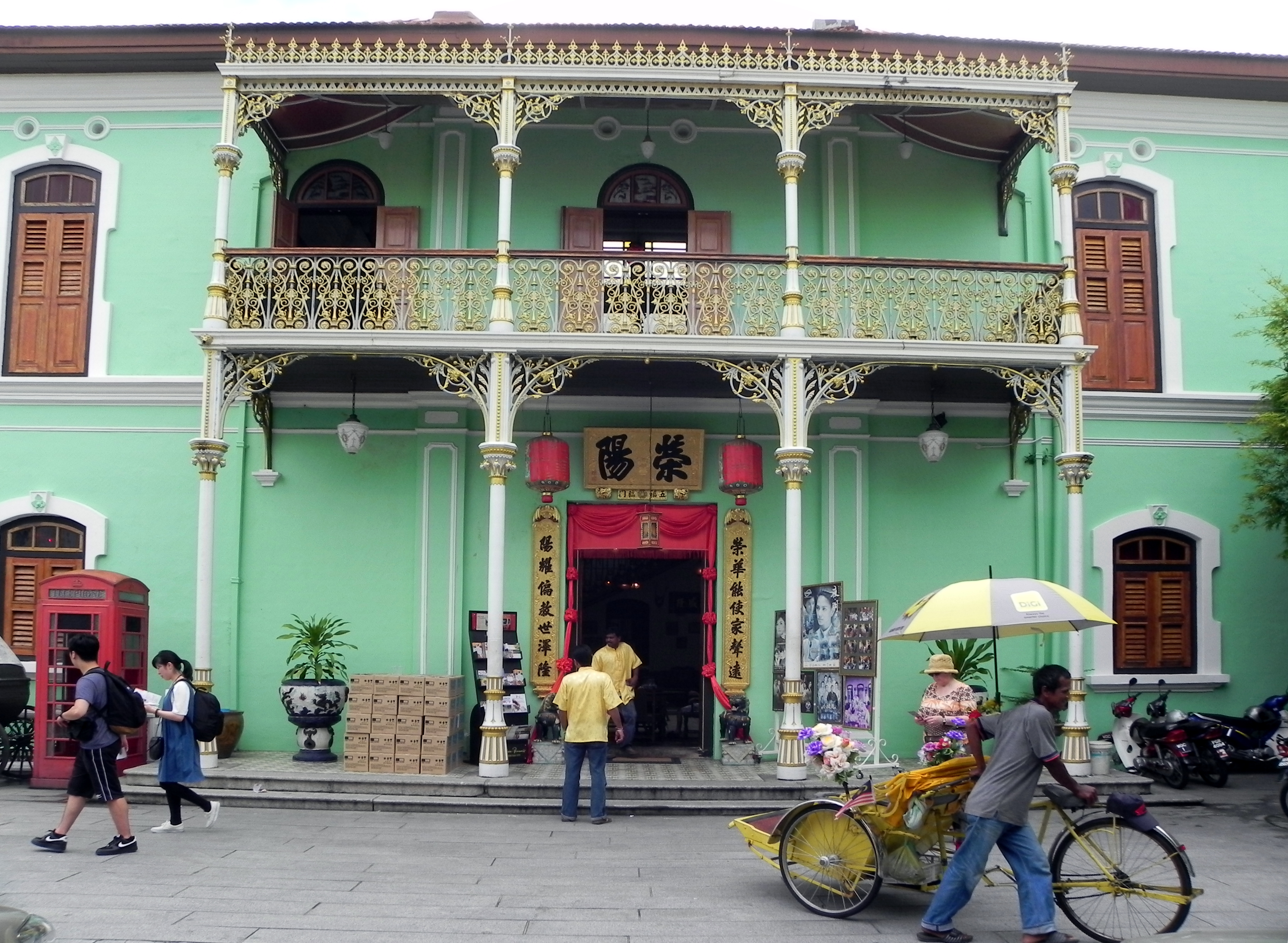
Sites of the Pinang Peranakan Mansion were used in the drama

This drama series took around a year of research and development, and four months for taping. More than 150 staff members were involved in production of the series and the cast was required to travel frequently from Singapore to Penang, Malacca and Ipoh during filming. This drama series was notable for having the highest production budget in the history of MediaCorp due to the elaborate period costumes like the kebaya. A pair of beaded shoes traversed over a cost of S$1,200, while a dining table acquired for the set cost S$15,000.

Several artists were initially cast or considered before the final cast was considered: May Phua was originally offered to play the role of Xiufeng, but was turned down due to her pregnancy; Huang Biren was also considered for the role of Tian Lan, but also declined due to not renewing her contract at the time; Elvin Ng was originally considered to be portraying Yamamoto Yousuke, but later replaced due to injury during training; Andrew Seow was first choice to play Robert Zhang but Seow left Mediacorp. It was also rumoured that Zoe Tay had expressed interest in portraying a role in the series, although Mediacorp claimed that there were no suitable roles for her.

The series initially received a 30-episode order, although over-runs in filming led the series to be extended to 34 episodes instead. Possibly as a result, two episodes were aired back-to-back on Mondays from 15 December 2008 till the season finale for the last four weeks.

== Promotion ==
Promotion for this drama series lasted throughout the initial broadcast of the series as well after the series ended. 12 members of the cast participated in "The Little Nyonya Public Event" 小娘惹户外影迷会 at Compass Point on 27 December 2008, which included an autograph session. The unprecedented number of appearances resulted in damage of the flooring at Compass Point, due to certain tiles on the floor cracked under the pressure exerted by the crowd.

A "Thank You Roadshow", another meet-the-cast session, was held at Suntec City on 31 January 2009. It featured several cast members from the first event as well as the singer of "如燕", Olivia Ong.

Minor roadshows were held at various locations between January and April 2009. On 17 January 2009, Jeanette Aw and Xiang Yun promoted bird nest at Tiong Bahru Plaza, while Qi Yuwu and Joanne Peh appeared at Courts Megastore along Tampines Road. Qi and Peh later appeared in character as Chen Xi and Huang Yuzhu respectively as part of the official launch for Media Fiesta at Marina Square on 5 March 2009. On 26 April 2009, Jeanette Aw and Pierre Png made an appearance at the first anniversary of the Singapore Peranakan Museum shortly before leaving to attend the Star Awards.

=== Chinese New Year Special ===
A one-hour Chinese New Year special, titled "The Little Nyonya's Big Reunion" (Chinese: 小娘惹大团圆), was aired on 26 January 2009, featuring the cast discussing about filming and discussion on the show, and about the unexplained fates of characters that were not mentioned in the finale. Unaired blooper clips and behind-the-scenes shots were also shown. The show was hosted by Dasmond Koh.

=== Home media release ===
The drama series was released by MediaCorp a 2-volume DVD boxset. The first volume, which contained the first 12 episodes of this drama series was released to stores on 6 January 2009. The remaining episodes were compiled in the second volume and released two weeks later. The boxset contains no special features, although it is accompanied by a booklet which provides descriptions of the major characters in the show, as well as a family tree.

Mediacorp's YouTube's channel, Mediacorp Drama, uploaded the episodes onto YouTube from February 4 thru 13, 2020. As of 2024, the series has also been archived on Mediacorp's video-on-demand platform meWatch.

== Commercial performance ==
This drama series achieved extremely high ratings during its initial run, with an average of 993,000 viewers per episode and peaking at 1.67 million viewers on the final episode. In addition, the series achieved the highest viewership rating in Singapore in 14 years.

Viewership for this drama series steadily increased throughout its run. Its first episode garnered an estimated 1.098 million viewers. On Episode 11, the show rating increased to 23.6%. The 15th and 16th episodes, both broadcast back-to-back, was watched by 24.1% of the country's population. The rating increased by 2.2% a week later, and further increased to 27.8% the week after. The viewership peaked at 33.8% on the final two episodes, also broadcast back-to-back.

== Critical response ==
The drama series received both praise and criticism. While some appreciated its depiction of Peranakan culture, others in local media criticized aspects of its portrayal and promotional strategies. Issues that were raised early included the castings of Pan Lingling and Cynthia Koh to portray teenage girls albeit being already in their thirties. This issue was counter-argued by being tantamount to ageism, as well as the fact that it was raised only three episodes after the show began airing. The character development of Xiufeng has come under fire due to the character's exhibitions of violence.

Some viewers perceived a bias towards actress Jeanette Aw, suggesting the series served to advance her television career and position her for accolades at the subsequent Star Awards. Several viewers also believe that the producers intentionally wrote Aw's first role as a mute in attempt to conceal her imperfect delivery of Mandarin. In response, producers have lauded Aw's work, saying that she performed in a professional manner. Despite this, Aw's portrayal of Juxiang and Yueniang has been praised by members of the audience.

The series employs dramatic license, leading to certain historical inaccuracies, especially in early episodes depicting Juxiang's life and Yueniang's childhood. Notable examples include the outbreak of the Second Sino-Japanese War in 1932 (as opposed to 1937) and the first air raid on Singapore (8 December 1941) occurring in broad daylight (which took place at night in reality).

=== The Little Nyonya: The Final Chapter ===
Ang Eng Tee, the scriptwriter, plotted five endings for the series, four of which would involve Yueniang and Chen Xi reuniting and living happily ever after. The final episode received mixed reactions from fans, with some describing it as bittersweet. The response also prompted Ang to say that had he know that viewers would react as such, but also mentioned that this is also the nature of a drama.

In an unprecedented move, Mediacorp released a three-minute alternate ending aired on 11 January 2009 at 9.55pm, titled The Little Nyonya: The Final Chapter (小娘惹之月娘与陈锡重逢篇, lit. The Little Nyonya: Yueniang and Chen Xi's reunion); according to producers, its script was finalized three days prior to the airing, with filming completed the day after. However, its ending also drew criticism, much like the original ending where Yueniang and Chen Xi were separated (instead told why the duo could not be reunited together). Mediacorp mentioned that these endings are not "alternate", but rather meant to be a special presentation in response to the viewers.

In terms of cultural transmission, The Little Nyonya portrays the Peranakan identity in a way that strengthens its connection to Singapore’s territorial and historical narratives. The series not only highlights the social status of the Peranakan community but also emphasizes their cultural uniqueness and role in Singapore’s historical development through detailed storytelling and visual representation. Peranakan history and culture have been employed to redefine ethnic markers, particularly Chineseness, by shifting their meaning from a broader national identity to a localized sense of Indigeneity. In response to concerns about Mainlander identity, the series' portrayal of Peranakan culture supports the indigenization of a distinct Chinese identity that is accessible to all Singaporeans, providing an aesthetic framework for ongoing negotiations of national identity.

At the narrative level, The Little Nyonya gives an important portrayal of Peranakan rituals, family sacrifices and other cultural elements. Family altars, wedding ceremonies, festivals and other details in the drama faithfully reproduce traditional Peranakan customs and highlight the central role of Confucian filial piety in family relationships.

In addition, through the struggle experience of the protagonist Yue Niang, the series reflects the adaptation and transformation of traditional culture in the process of social modernization in Singapore, which not only shows the change of the role of women in the family, but also reflects the reshaping of Peranakan culture in the context of globalization.

Overall, The Little Nyonya is not only a family series about Peranakan history, but also a cultural work that reflects the shaping of Singapore's national identity. Its depiction of the Peranakan has made it part of the mainstream cultural narrative in Singapore, while also sparking discussion among the audience about the relationship between traditional values and modern society.

== Accolades ==
This drama set a record of having 16 nominations (beating the previous record holder's Holland V of nine) during Star Awards 2009 held on 26 April 2009, and won nine awards (including the Drama Serial and the Top Viewership Drama Serial of 2008), a then-record for any drama awards at the time of the ceremony.

The Chinese New Year special series, The Little Nyonya Big Reunion, and the promotional advertisement for the encore telecast for the series, were respectively nominated for Star Awards 2010 and Star Awards 2011, which the latter won.

In total, the entire franchise won a combined 11 awards from four award ceremonies.

Year	Award	Category	Nominee	Result	Ref
Star Awards	2009	Young Talent Award	Christabelle Tan	Nominated	
Star Awards	2009	Best Director	Chia Mien Yang	Won	
Star Awards	2009	Best Director	Chong Liung Man	Won	
Star Awards	2009	Best Screenplay	Ang Eng Tee	Won	
Star Awards	2009	Best Set Design	Ho Hock Choon	Won	
Star Awards	2009	Best Theme Song	"如燕" by Olivia Ong	Won	
Star Awards	2009	Best Actor	Qi Yuwu	Nominated	
Star Awards	2009	Best Actor	Pierre Png	Nominated	
Star Awards	2009	Best Actress	Jeanette Aw	Nominated	
Star Awards	2009	Best Actress	Joanne Peh	Won	
Star Awards	2009	Best Supporting Actor	Dai Xiangyu	Nominated	
Star Awards	2009	Best Supporting Actor	Darren Lim	Nominated	
Star Awards	2009	Best Supporting Actor	Yao Wenlong	Nominated	
Star Awards	2009	Best Supporting Actor	Zen Chong	Nominated	
Star Awards	2009	Best Supporting Actress	Eelyn Kok	Nominated	
Star Awards	2009	Best Supporting Actress	Li Yinzhu	Nominated	
Star Awards	2009	Best Supporting Actress	Lin Meijiao	Nominated	
Star Awards	2009	Best Supporting Actress	Ng Hui	Won	
Star Awards	2009	Best Supporting Actress	Xiang Yun	Won	
Star Awards	2009	Best Drama Serial	—N/a	Won	
Star Awards	2009	Top 10 Highest Viewership Local Dramas in 2008 Award	—N/a	Won	
Star Awards	2010	Best Variety Special	The Little Nyonya Big Reunion	Nominated	
Star Awards	2011	Best Promotional Video	Danny Loh Boon Kiat	Won	
Asian Television Awards	2009	Best Actor	Qi Yuwu	Nominated	
Asian Television Awards	2009	Best Actor	Pierre Png	Nominated	
Asian Television Awards	2009	Best Actress	Joanne Peh	Nominated	
Asian Television Awards	2009	Best Drama Series	The Little Nyonya	Won (Joint winner)	

== Legacy ==
The drama series has been recognized for its cultural impact on Singaporean media. The series was parodied in a segment of the variety show Black Rose. In the episode when the encore started its debut, Chen Hanwei portrayes Liu Yidao (刘一刀) and Dennis Chew portrayed Yamamoto Yueniang (山本月娘). It was also used in the skit segment of Star Search 2010 Grand Finals in which contestants played Liu Yidao, Huang Yuzhu, Ah Tao and Robert Zhang.

=== The Peranakan Ball ===
On 16 May 2009, Jeanette Aw and Dai Xiangyu starred in a musical called The Peranakan Ball (Chinese: 娘惹之恋). The musical is based on the story of Cinderella and it stars Jeanette Aw as Bee Tin, a Nyonya servant in a wealthy Peranakan Chinese household, and unrelated to this drama series, although the concept bears similarities to The Little Nyonya, it was not officially affiliated with the series.

=== Pretty Maid ===
While not promoted as such, and the program was produced by a different television station, Some online viewers have drawn comparisons between Pretty Maid and The Little Nyonya, citing plot similarities. However, there is no official confirmation of any direct adaptation or plagiarism. Pretty Maid was produced by Yu Zheng and broadcast by Hunan Broadcasting System in China. On 6 May 2010, Pretty Maid's writer Li Yaling (李亚玲) claimed that Yu Zheng indeed plagiarized from this drama series either. She claimed that Yu Zheng once told her that as long as plagiarism does not exceed 20% then the courts would have no case. Another writer Zou Yue (邹越) also claimed to have heard the "20% rule" from Yu Zheng.

=== Precious (The Little Nyonya remake) ===
This is a remake of this show. Set during the 1930s to 2000s, "Qian Jin" spans three generations and is about a young girl named Ling Qian Jin (also portrayed by Jeanette Aw) who was orphaned as a toddler. A decade later as a young lady, she rediscovers her family and her identity. The story follows Qian Jin, an orphan who faces mistreatment from her step-grandmother and finds herself involved in a complex romantic entanglement.

=== The New Little Nyonya 2020 remake ===
In October 2018, it was announced that a Chinese remake of the show was in the works and would be aired on Chinese online video platform, iQiyi initially slated for 2019, but now in 2020. It is a joint production between iQiyi, Changxin Pictures and Singapore-based G.H.Y Culture & Media and will star Xiao Yan, Kou Chia-Jui, Yue Lina, He Yuhong, Darren Chiu, Dai Xiangyu, Xiang Yun, Jeffrey Xu and Fang Cheng Cheng as the main leads. Additionally, Dai, who played Yamamoto Yousuke in the original series, is reprising as the same role in the remake series. A mixture of Singaporean, Malaysian and Chinese actors from China, Hong Kong, Taiwan and even Canada were cast as the other major and minor characters in the remake.

The remake's plot was generally reminiscent of the original's, though there are a few changes made to the plot, with changes made to address certain narrative gaps from the original series. The significant changes are that in the ending, both Yueniang and Chen Xi are reunited six years after Yueniang's presumed death, and happily married; Huang Yuzhu's mental condition improved and she reunited with the Huang family after her recovery; the adopted son of Robert Zhang and Yuzhu was named Huang Cien (黄慈恩) instead of Zhang Zuye (张祖业), following his mother's surname while subsequently allowing his own descendants to adopt the surname Chen (Chen Xi's surname); and that both Libby and Paul are engaged to different people. Another hidden ending (albeit speculated) is that both Chen Xi and Yueniang have one daughter together, and the daughter was subsequently married to Cien and have children with one another.

Other changes were made to the fates of some characters: Huang Tianbao; instead of being sentenced to death, was shot and killed by police officers after attempting to kill Chen Gong and Chen Xi, whom he took hostage for ransom, Huang Zhenzhu; who lost all her money to her Caucasian lover whom she eloped with, and feeling too ashamed to see her family, she became a prostitute who entertain British customers and subsequently died in a car accident, Charlie Zhang; who died protecting his son Robert Zhang from being shot by Tianbao, and Robert; who was not killed by Tianbao but fell to his death while trying to escape from Tianbao. Unlike the original series, the whole remake series was narrated by Yueniang's granddaughter instead of Yueniang herself to her granddaughter, as her granddaughter did not appear in the remake.

Singapore would eventually air the remake which premiered on 5 January 2021 at 11pm. The series finale aired on 10 March 2021.

== Sequel ==
In an interview with Lianhe Wanbao, scriptwriter Ang Eng Tee, said that a sequel or a special could be created if the demand exists. Ideas for a possible sequel or special presentation have already been drafted by Ang, one of which would have Angela receiving a secret wooden box from Ah Tao, before Angela returns to Singapore. The box was owned by Yueniang, and Ah Tao defied her orders to burn the contents before Yueniang died. The scriptwriter has drafted potential sequel ideas, including storylines involving Angela and a mysterious box left by Ah Tao, in addition to a letter from Libby, telling Yueniang that Chen Xi and Libby did not get married after all. However, producers noted that a sequel seems to be unlikely citing high production costs and logistics, although that some other drama series were given a sequel follow-up.

In October 2023, Mediacorp announced that a sequel to the series would begin production in January 2024, titled Emerald Hill - The Little Nyonya Story (小娘惹之翡翠山; lit. The Little Nyonya: Emerald Hill) with Jeanette Aw making a special appearance in the sequel, reprising her role as Middle-Age Yamamoto Yueniang (山本月娘). The sequel also added cast Tasha Low, Chen Liping, Jesseca Liu, Chantalle Ng, Ferlyn Wong, Kiki Lim, Sheila Sim, Elvin Ng, Zoe Tay, Shaun Chen, Romeo Tan, Tyler Ten, Zhang Zetong, Dawn Yeoh, Desmond Ng, Herman Keh, Zhai Siming and Zhu Zeliang. Zhang replaced Edsel Lim and Zen Chong as Middle-Age Huang Zuye (黄祖业) in the upcoming sequel. The sequel was first released on Netflix and mewatch Prime on 10 March 2025 and ended on 21 April, and on Channel 8 from 19 March to 30 April (originally 29 April). It was also the first Mediacorp drama to have both acquired through a pre-sale deal and simulcast on Netflix.

On 25 June 2026, Mediacorp announced that a third instalment in the ''Little Nyonya'' franchise was in development, with an expected premiere in 2028. The production is set to be executive-produced by Canter Chia and written by Ang Eng Tee, who also wrote the previous two instalments, ''The Little Nyonya'' and ''Emerald Hill''.

== International release history ==
The drama serial was broadcast overseas, mostly in the Asian region.

Country of Broadcast	Broadcasting Network	Release date
Malaysia	Astro Shuang Xing, Astro AEC	2 February 2009
Malaysia	NTV7	26 October 2009
Cambodia	PPCTV Drama 9	29 March 2009
France	MIPTV	31 March 2009
Philippines	TV5	24 August 2009
Myanmar	MRTV	5 September 2009
United States	Tai Seng Entertainment Channel (broadcast on DirecTV)	1 December 2009
Vietnam	Vietnam Television	12 August 2010
China (Shanghai)	TBA	2009
China (run across China via satellite)	TBA	16 January 2010
Thailand	Thai Public Broadcasting Service	20 January 2010
Hong Kong	TVB PayVision	26 April 2010
Malaysia	Astro AEC	16 December 2019

In Indonesia, aired on B-Channel starts July 2011.The series was originally scheduled to air in Malaysia in mid-January, but was later delayed to February. The series was also aired by TV stations in Cambodia, Vietnam and China.

On 1 December 2009, Tai Seng Entertainment Channel, an ethnic Chinese entertainment channel on DirecTV, became the first non-Asian station to air the series. It is also the first station to air the series with Cantonese dubbing.

Hong Kong broadcaster TVB purchased the rights to telecast the series in April 2009, and aired the series a year later, in late April 2010. Just like the United States, the series has also been Cantonese-dubbed.

The series was promoted at the MIPTV Television Trade Show in Cannes, France, near the end of March 2009. Jeanette Aw and Qi Yuwu were also in Cannes to promote the series at MIPTV.

== Notes ==
Preceded by Metamorphosis; 2007	Star Awards for Best Drama Serial; The Little Nyonya; 2008-09	Succeeded by Together; 2009-10
