= Zhou Ying (actress) =

Chinese actress based in Singapore

- Born: 18 November 1984 (age 41); Shanghai, China
- Occupation: Actress
- Years active: 2007-present

Chinese name
- Simplified Chinese: 周颖
Transcriptions
Standard Mandarin
- Hanyu Pinyin: Zhōu Yǐng

Zhou Ying (Chinese: 周颖; pinyin: Zhōu Yǐng) is a Chinese actress. She was formerly based in Singapore and was a full-time Mediacorp artiste from 2007 to 2014.

== Career ==
A graduate of the Shanghai Theatre Academy, Zhou moved to Singapore to take part in Star Search 2007 and was under the mentorship of acclaimed veteran actress Huang Biren. Although she was eliminated in the quarterfinals, she was offered a contract by MediaCorp. She signed as a full-time artiste in 2010 and moved to Singapore permanently.

Zhou gained her first nomination for Best Actress. She won her first Top 10 Most Popular Female Artistes in 2011 and was nominated from 2012 to 2014. She was nominated for Favourite Female Character and Favourite Onscreen Couple (Drama). In 2013, she was nominated for Favourite Onscreen Couple (Drama).

In January 2014, Zhou returned to Shanghai to be with her family and also to pursue acting opportunities in China.

== Filmography ==
=== Television ===
Year	Work	Role	Notes	Ref
2009	Table of Glory	Zhang Ziyi 张姿怡		
2009	Together	Qin Huimin 秦慧敏		
2010	Unriddle	Zhong Ah'ni 钟阿妮		
2010	Breakout	Tang Ying 汤颖		
2011	Devotion	Wang Yuanfang 王圆芳		
2012	Unriddle 2	Zhong Ah'ni 钟阿妮		
2012	Absolutely Charming	Xie Enlin 谢恩琳		
2012	The Quarters	Huang Qiumei 黄秋妹		
2013	It's a Wonderful Life	Zhong Jingyi 种精义		
2014	Soup of Life	Jiang Hong 姜虹		
2014	The Caregivers Missy 先生	Lin Si'en 林思恩		
2016	Les Interprètes 亲爱的翻译官	Han Meimei 韩梅梅		
2016	Ten Deadly Sins 十宗罪	Li Feng 李凤		

=== Hosting ===
Year	Show	Notes
2010	Lodge With Me 我行我宿	Thailand episodes
2012	S.N.A.P. 熠熠星光总动员	
2012	Channel 8 30th Anniversary Roadshow 戏剧情牵30	
2012	Style: Check-In 潮人攻略	
2013	Style: Check-In 2 潮人攻略2	

== Accolades ==
Year	Ceremony	Category	Nominated work	Result
2011	Star Awards	Best Actress	Breakout (as Tang Ying)	Nominated
2011	Star Awards	Favourite Female Character	Breakout (as Tang Ying)	Nominated
2011	Star Awards	Favourite Onscreen Couple (Drama)	Breakout (as Tang Ying)	Nominated
2011	Star Awards	Top 10 Most Popular Female Artistes	—N/a	Won
2012	Star Awards	Top 10 Most Popular Female Artistes	—N/a	Nominated
2013	Star Awards	Top 10 Most Popular Female Artistes	—N/a	Nominated
2014	Star Awards	Top 10 Most Popular Female Artistes	—N/a	Nominated
