= With You (Singaporean TV series) =

Singaporean TV series

- 我在你左右
- Genre: Melodrama; Fantasy
- Created by: Chen Sew Khoon 陈秀群; Lau Chin Poon 刘清盆
- Written by: Lau Chin Poon 刘清盆 and co.
- Directed by: Leong Lye Lin 梁来玲; Chong Liung Man 张龙敏
- Starring: Adrian Pang; Chen Hanwei; Rui En; Nat Ho; Chen Shucheng
- Opening theme: 感.受 by 黄智仁
- Ending theme: Inside of Me by 黄智仁
- Country of origin: Singapore
- Original language: Chinese
- No. of episodes: 20

Production
- Producer: Soh Bee Lian 苏美莲
- Running time: approx. 45 minutes per episode

Original release
- Network: MediaCorp Channel 8
- Release: 12 May – 8 June 2010

With You (Chinese: 我在你左右) is a Singaporean Chinese drama which was telecasted on Singapore's free-to-air channel, MediaCorp Channel 8. It stars Adrian Pang, Chen Hanwei, Rui En, Nat Ho and Chen Shucheng as the cast of the series. It made its debut on 12 May 2010 and ended on 8 June 2010, consisting of 20 episodes. The series was MediaCorp's most highly rated drama of 2010 and focused on the effects the supernatural had on a series of people.

== Plot ==
Zhou Wen An is a DIY Owner and Handyman of his owned DIY Store, and a rough around the edges, yet easy-going man. He gets into a traffic accident with Zhang Yang, when the former accidentally knocked into the brakes of the latter's motorcycle whilst driving his pickup truck and did not manage to stop in time. During this time, the latter is on his way home to celebrate his father named Zhang Yong Sheng's birthday. Wen An, who has a keen sixth sense, feels something amiss and advises Zhang Yang to stop riding the motorcycle. The latter refuses to listen and rides off. As a result of brakes damaged earlier, Zhang Yang dies when his motorcycle gets into a subsequent car accident.

After dying, Zhang Yang's soul is trapped at the accident site. Desperately trying to return home, Zhang Yang's attempts to seek help are futile as nobody can see or hear him. Just when he thinks all hopes are dashed, Wen An appears. Besides being able to see Zhang Yang, Wen An can also communicate with him. Zhang Yang begins to pester Wen An as he strongly believes that only Wen An can help him to return home. Not one to give in to threats, Wen An tries to shake Zhang Yang off, only to have Zhang Yang re-appearing next to him time and again. Seeing that Zhang Yang is a filial son, and feeling that he was indirectly responsible for Zhang Yang's death, Wen An decides to help the latter.

Wen An starts hanging out at the traiditional coffee shop known as Sheng Ji (盛记), which is owned by Yong Sheng and the Zhang family. His over enthusiasm has the Zhang family thinking he is out of his mind. Despite the Zhangs' reserved attitude towards him, Wen An continues to help Zhang Yang and his family as promised.

After returning home, Zhang Yang realizes that he is neither able to converse with his family nor help them with their problems. Witnessing his family grieve over his passing makes Zhang Yang decide to help them move on.

Business at Sheng Ji (盛记) gets from bad to worse. Zhang Yang approaches Wen An to help Yong Sheng revamp and modernize his outdated Sheng Ji (盛记) and rename it as New Sheng Ji (新盛记). In the midst of helping the Zhang family, Wen An triggers hostility with Zhang Yang's younger brother, Zhang Huan, who feels that Wen An is being too intrusive with their domestic affairs. Zhang Huan has also accumulated huge credit card debts, and wants to purchase a sports car. To get the money, he attempted to cheat Yong Sheng of S$20,000 from the renovation fees from Sheng Ji (盛记) to New Sheng Ji (新盛记) by collaborating with his friend whom is a general contractor to earn commission from Yong Sheng. Zhang Huan's relationship with Yong Sheng deteriorates when the latter reprimands the former. As a result, the hostility between the two deepens.

Lin Jie Ying, Zhang Huan's girlfriend, is a frank and lovable girl. While working on a short film on prostitutes, she meets Wen An, who mistakes her for one. When Jie Ying decides to make a short film on the supernatural, she pesters Wen An for his help as the latter had told her about Zhang Yang's existence. Slowly, Jie Ying finds herself attracted to Wen An and finds herself drifting away from Zhang Huan, whom she feels is too eager for success. Once again, Zhang Huan fails to see where the problem lies and pins the blame on Wen An. Zhang Huan becomes more resentful towards Wen An and accuses Wen An of being the third wheel in his relationship with Jie Ying.

After the death of Zhang Yang, Yong Sheng tries his best to keep the family together. Yet no one knows the pain he has to go through, with his youngest son Zhang Huan causing trouble and his eldest son Zhang Wei facing domestic issues.

Easy-going by nature, Zhang Wei does not expect much from life. His only wish is to help his father keep the coffee shop. Zhang Wei's wife, Zhao Mei Xiang, feels insecure about their future. When it is announced that Yong Sheng will be modernizing the coffee shop to fulfill Zhang Yang's wish, Mei Xiang begins to make plans to safeguard her own interests for fear of being left in destitute as soon as Yong Sheng passes on.

Initially forced to look after Zhang Yang's wife Ye Si Qi and their daughter, Zhang Wei Wei, Wen An soon develops a newfound respect for Si Qi when he witnesses how Si Qi faces her problems courageously – from losing her husband to discovering she's pregnant with his child to learning about a tumor in her womb. She even had to deal with the posthumous knowledge of her husband's infidelity with another woman named Chen Xiao Min. This knowledge deals a greater blow to her than news of his death. Emotionally drained and exhausted, Si Qi decides to leave the love she has for Zhang Yang behind, and move on.

Zhang Yang notices that Si Qi has grown to depend more and more on Wen An, and has begun treating him as her confidante. Overwhelmed by jealousy, Zhang Yang has a clash with Wen An. As a result, Wen An begins to avoid Si Qi. Over time, Si Qi starts to believe in Zhang Yang's existence as she realizes how similar Wen An is to Zhang Yang. She takes the initiative to get closer to him.

== Cast ==
=== Main cast ===
- Adrian Pang as Zhou Wen An 周文安, the owner of a hardware store.
- Chen Hanwei as Zhang Yang 张扬, Ye Siqi's Husband who died at the beginning of the show.
- Rui En as Ye Siqi 叶思琪, Zhang's wife who owns a fashion label, Left Right.

=== Supporting cast ===
Artiste	Character	Description	Episodes
Nat Ho	Zhang Huan 张焕	Main Villain/Antagonist of the series Zhang Yang and Zhang Wei's Youngest Brother; Zhang Yong Sheng's Youngest Son; Zhou Wen An's Enemy; Lin Jieying's Ex-Boyfriend; Caused Zhang Yang's death by throwing an empty drink can onto the road and causing Deaf Granny to pick it up for him Attempted to cheat Zhang Yong Sheng of S$20,000 from the renovation fees by collaborating with his friend whom is a general contractor to earn commission from Yong Sheng; Accumulated huge credit card debts and managed to purchase a sports car in Episode 9 Possessed by Zhang Yang in Episode 11; Unpossessed by Zhang Yang in Episode 14; Found out he was the one who caused Zhang Yang's death in Episode 20	1–3, 5–20
Chen Shucheng	Zhang Yong Sheng 张永盛	Zhang Yang, Zhang Wei and Zhang Huan's Father; Ye Siqi and Zhao Mei Xiang's Father-In-Law; Zhang Wei Wei and Zhang Zi Ming's Grandfather	
Brandon Wong 黄炯耀	Zhang Wei 张伟	Zhao Mei Xiang's Husband; Zhang Yang, Zhang Huan and Ye Siqi's Eldest Brother; Zhang Yongsheng's Eldest Son; Zhang Wei Wei's Paternal Uncle; Zhang Zi Ming's Father	
May Phua	Zhao Meixiang 赵美香	Semi-Villain/Antagonist of the series Zhang Wei's Wife; Zhang Yang, Zhang Huan and Ye Siqi's Eldest Sister-In-Law; Zhang Yong Sheng's Eldest Daughter-In-Law; Zhang Wei Wei's Paternal Aunt; Zhang Zi Ming's Mother	
Moo Yan Yee 吴恩仪	Lin Jie Ying 林洁莹	Zhang Huan's Ex-Girlfriend; Has a crush on Zhou Wen An and eventually became his new and current girlfriend	3, 5–8, 11–13, 15–20
Zhu Xiufeng 朱秀凤	Deaf Granny 聋婆	Zhou Wen An's Great-Aunt; Raised Zhou Wen An since he was still a child	1–2, 5–6, 8, 10–13, 15–16, 20
Kaylar Ong Zhi Wei 王子薇	Zhang Wei Wei 张薇薇	Zhang Yang and Ye Siqi's Daughter; Zhang Wei, Zhang Huan and Zhao Mei Xiang's Nephew; Zhang Yong Sheng's Paternal Granddaughter	
Keane Chan Sing-Siu 陈星兆	Zhang Zi Ming 张子明	Zhang Wei and Zhao Meixiang's Son; Zhang Yang, Zhang Huan and Ye Siqi's Nephew; Zhang Yong Sheng's Paternal Grandson	
Lina Ng	Chen Xiao Min 陈晓敏	Zhang Yang's Ex-Girlfriend; Has a son who is Zhang Yang's godson after her husband died in a car accident, and because of this reason, Zhang Yang motivated her by purchasing a florist retail shop and a van to be able to work on the flower business and doing the delivery service	
Amy Cheng	Kang Yafang 康雅芳	Zhang Wei's Cooking Teacher	
Joy Yak 易凌	Mabel	Supporting Villain/Antagonist of the series Ye Siqi's Former Best Friend; Co-Owner of Left Right, a fashion label Betrayed Ye Siqi in Episode 14 by skipping town and stealing the company funds for her own personal expenditure	
Asher Su 苏才忠	Ah Hui 阿辉	Zhou Wen An's Best Friend and Business Partner at the DIY Store	

== Reception ==
Average viewership for each episode is 969,000.

=== Accolades ===
Organisation	Year	Category	Nominee(s)	Result	Ref.
Star Awards	2011	Young Talent Award	Kaylar Ong Zhi Wei	Nominated	
Star Awards	2011	Best Drama Theme Song Award	《感.受》 by 黄智仁	Nominated	
Star Awards	2011	Most Favorite Onscreen Couple	Rui En and Chen Hanwei	Nominated	
Star Awards	2011	Best Music/Sound Design	—N/a	Nominated	
Star Awards	2011	Technical Category:Best Screenplay	—N/a	Won	
Star Awards	2011	Best Actress	Rui En	Won	
Star Awards	2011	Top Rated Drama Serial	—N/a	Won	
Star Awards	2011	Best Drama Serial	—N/a	Nominated	

== See also ==
- List of programmes broadcast by MediaCorp Channel 8
- List of MediaCorp Channel 8 Chinese drama series (2010s)
