= The Family Court (TV series) =

- 走进走出
- Genre: Legal drama
- Created by: Ng Kah Huay 黄佳华
- Written by: Ng Kah Huay 黄佳华; Lau Chin Poon 刘清盆
- Directed by: Loo Yin Kam 卢燕金
- Starring: Tay Ping Hui; Qi Yuwu; Tong Bing Yu; Eelyn Kok; Yao Wenlong; Wayne Chua
- Opening theme: 反复 by Huang Zhi Ren
- Ending theme: 圈 by Huang Zhi Ren
- Country of origin: Singapore
- Original language: Chinese
- No. of episodes: 23

Production
- Producer: Lai Lee Thin 赖丽婷
- Running time: approx. 45 minutes

Original release
- Network: MediaCorp Channel 8
- Release: 1 September – 1 October 2010

The Family Court (Chinese: 走进走出) is a Singaporean Chinese drama which was telecasted on Singapore's free-to-air channel, MediaCorp Channel 8. It stars Tay Ping Hui, Qi Yuwu, Tong Bing Yu, Eelyn Kok, Yao Wenlong and Wayne Chua as the casts of the series. It made its debut on 1 September 2010 and ended on 1 October 2010. This drama serial consists of 23 episodes, and was screened every weekday night at 9:00 pm. The encore aired from 26 August 2011 to 27 September 2011, every weekday at 5:30pm.

== Synopsis ==
Shen Xiping, Lin Leshan, Huang Shuya and Zhao Ning are lawyers who are poles apart from each other but together with Huang Guanying (Shuya's older brother), they form a tight group of friends. Despite being employed by two different law firms, and at times having to face off against each other in court, the five do not mix work with their personal lives. This is what keeps their friendship going. After work, the group usually gathers at Xiping's family-owned pub to talk about work and their lives. With such a strong friendship forged, a complicated love rectangle is inevitable.

== Cast ==
- Tay Ping Hui as Shen Xiping
- Qi Yuwu as Lin Leshan
- Tong Bing Yu as Huang Shuya
- Eelyn Kok as Zhao Ning
- Yao Wenlong as Huang Guanying
- Wayne Chua as Xia Yan
- Ann Kok as Zheng Danni
- Hong Huifang as Liu Aizhu
- Darren Lim as Xu Zhiqiang
- May Phua as Zhang Liling
- Ye Shipin as Li Shouye
- Rayson Tan as Shen Yi'an
- Constance Song as Xu Fenghuang
- Priscelia Chan as Su Shan
- Nick Shen as Wu Baoming
- Ong Ai Leng as Lai Xiuxiu
- Alan Tern as Liu Yacai
- Bryan Chan as Chen Tianlai
- Yan Bingliang as Wang Shunxing
- Li Wenhai as Chief Justice

== Accolades ==
Organisation	Year	Category	Recipient(s)	Result	Ref
Star Awards	2011	Best Director 最佳导演	Loo Yin Kam	Nominated	
Star Awards	2011	Best Screenplay 最佳剧本	Ng Kah Huay	Nominated	
Star Awards	2011	Favourite Male Character 最喜爱男主角	Qi Yuwu	Nominated	
Star Awards	2011	Favourite On-screen Couple	Tay Ping Hui and Chris Tong	Nominated	
Star Awards	2011	Best Supporting Actor	Yao Wenlong	Nominated	
Star Awards	2011	Best Supporting Actress	Ann Kok	Nominated	
Star Awards	2011	Best Actor	Qi Yuwu	Won	
Star Awards	2011	Best Actor	Tay Ping Hui	Nominated	
Star Awards	2011	Best Drama Serial	—N/a	Nominated	
Star Awards	2011	Top Rated Drama Serial 2010	—N/a	Nominated	
