= Dennis Chew =

Singaporean media personality (born 1973)

- Born: 15 August 1973 (age 53); Singapore
- Education: Pearl's Hill Primary School; Tuan Mong High School; Shatec Institutes
- Occupations: Radio deejay; actor; host; businessman; singer
- Years active: 1991–present
- Awards: Full list

Chinese name
- Traditional Chinese: 周崇慶
- Simplified Chinese: 周崇庆
- Hanyu Pinyin: Zhōu Chóngqìng

Dennis Chew Chong Kheng (born 15 August 1973), also known as Zhou Chongqing, is a Singaporean radio deejay, actor, variety show host, businessman and singer. Chew is known for playing Aunty Lucy, a character which requires him to cross-dress as a woman in the variety show Paris and Milan.

== Early life ==
Chew studied at the former Pearl's Hill Primary School and Tuan Mong High School (predecessor of Ngee Ann Secondary School). At 13, Chew performed in the musical and children's television programme Chinese Idioms 50 成语50. At 14, he was talent scouted for a commercial for Yakult. He was part of the first batch of students in the teen acting classes organised by the Singapore Broadcasting Corporation during the late 1980s. In 1991, he played a substantial role in the TV drama The Future is Mine 锦绣前程.

After serving his National Service, Chew went on to Shatec to get a Diploma in Hotel Management as he realised during NS that it is important to further his studies.

In 2025, Chew graduated from Ngee Ann Polytechnic with a diploma in Chinese media and communication.

== Career ==
Chew became a Chinese teacher in Yumin Primary School and Raffles Girls' Primary School after completing his education. At the same time, he also worked as a part-time DJ at local radio station YES 933. A few years later, he signed on as a full-time DJ with YES 933.

In January 2005, Chew released a music album, containing nine original songs.

Chew's big break in television came in 2009 when he portrayed Aunty Lucy in the variety show Paris and Milan (女王本色), which also starred Patricia Mok, Michelle Tay and Ben Yeo. His performance was extremely well received, earning him popularity which led to his first ever win (Top 10 Most Popular Male Artistes Award) at the annual Star Awards in 2010. The character's catchphrase "Aiyoh, so embarrassing!" and the swooshing of his head to the right was popular with audiences. "Aunty Lucy" was also featured in films like Aunty Lucy Slam Dunk (Auntie Lucy 也灌篮) (2009), It's a Great, Great World (大世界) (2011) and Dance Dance Dragon (龙众舞) (2012), and the game show We Are Singaporeans (season 1 - 2011) as a guest. Chew later stated in an interview that the success of Aunty Lucy was a major turning point in his career, and the endorsement deals it brought helped him clear debts which he had incurred from an unsuccessful business venture.

While juggling DJ duties, Chew also hosts many different programmes ranging from roadshows, variety programmes and game shows, and starred in several television series. He had also participated in several local productions and films. These include the 881 The Musical, in which he played the role of an evil artiste manager. In February 2013, Chew finalised his plans to move over to Love 97.2FM in mid-March as DJ, after hosting at YES 93.3FM for 20 years.

In 2019, Chew appeared in an advertisement by e-payments website epaysg.com, where he portrayed characters such as a woman in a tudung and a man with visibly darker skin. Broadcaster Mediacorp, through its celebrity management wing, later apologized for the controversial ad and the epaysg.com website has also removed it.

== Personal life ==
In April 2022, Chew returned to study and enrolled in Ngee Ann Polytechnic to pursue a diploma in Chinese Media and Communication. In October 2023, Chew was awarded a scholarship by the Kongzi Culture Fund's Pei Hwa Foundation.

In February 2025, Dennis completed his studies at the polytechnic.

== Filmography ==
=== Film ===
Year	Title	Role	Notes	Ref.
2006	Zodiac: The Race Begins	Rooster, Rat, Evil Official	Voiceover	
2007	One Last Dance (茶舞)	Foresan		
2007	Men in White	Himself		
2009	Aunty Lucy Slam Dunk (Auntie Lucy也灌篮)	Auntie Lucy		
2011	It's a Great, Great World	Auntie Lucy		
2011	The Ghosts Must Be Crazy	Ah Tan		
2012	Dance Dance Dragon	Lucy Long		
2012	Ghost on Air	Ping Xiao		
2013	Everybody's Business	Mr Tay	Special appearance	
2015	King of Mahjong			
2016	My Love Sinema (放映爱)	Mark Tan		
2017	Take 2			
2019	Make It Big Big	Himself		
2019	When Ghost Meets Zombie	Hell Manager		

=== Television series ===
Year	Title	Role	Notes	Ref.
1989	Good Morning, Sir! 早安！老師			
1991	The Future is Mine 锦绣前程	Zhu Xiangqian		
1992	Duel in Shanghai 轰天龙虎	Yan Huaiming		
1993	Heavenly Beings 再战封神榜	Lan Caihe		
1993	Hidden Truth 法网晴天	Lin Zhiji		
1993	Battle of Justice 人海孤鸿	Short-sighted		
1999	Darling-In-Law 我的岳母是巫婆	Host	Cameo	
2000	The Invincible Squad	Zhang Wenqing		
2001	Love Me, Love Me Not	Xiongxiong	Cameo	
2002	My Genie 2 v	3838438		
2002	New Dragon's Inn 新龙门客栈	Dian Xiao-er		
2012	Blk 88		Voice-over (guest appearance); Animated web series	
2012	Beyond	Marcus	Cameo	
2013	It's a Wonderful Life	Bai Baoxiang		
2013	The Dream Makers	Fang Yuanren		
2014	Yes We Can!	Mr Chew	Cameo	
2014	World at Your Feet	Lan Yangyang 蓝阳阳		
2015	The Dream Makers II	Fang Yuanren		
2014-2015	118	Wang Shunfeng		
2016	I Want to Be a Star	Edgar		
2016	Hero	Aunty Lucy	Cameo	
2016	Happy Can Already!	Aunty Lucy	Cameo	
2017	Happy Can Already! 2	Aunty Lucy	Cameo	
2018	Eat Already? 4	Aunty Lucy		
2016-2017	118 II	Wang Shunfeng		
2018	118 Reunion 118大团圆	Wang Shunfeng		
2018	My Agent Is A Hero 流氓经纪	Lin Bozai	Cameo	
2019	Limited Edition 我是限量版	Yingxiong		
2019	I See You 看见看不见的你	748		
2019	My One in a Million 我的万里挑一	Zhang Sheng	Cameo	
2019	A World of Difference 都市狂想	Mr Zhou		
2021	Mr Zhou's Ghost Stories@Job Haunting	Mr Zhou		
2022	Mr Zhou's Ghost stories @ Singapore's Sightings 周公讲鬼,哪里有鬼	Mr Zhou		
2023	Mr Zhou's Ghost Stories@Job Haunting II	Mr Zhou		
2022	Home Again 多年后的全家福	Xiao Ma Ge		
2025	Emerald Hill - The Little Nyonya Story (小娘惹之翡翠山)	Ni Lao Zi		

=== Television host ===
- Celebrity Squares《名人 tic tac toe》常驻嘉宾 (2001)
- One Fun Day《惊喜一整天》(2001 - 2002) (with Dasmond Koh, Florence Tan, Mark Lee, Patricia Mok)
- One Fun Day II《惊喜一整天》II (2002) (with Dasmond Koh, Florence Tan, Mark Lee, Patricia Mok)
- Innocent Moments 《小小儿戏》(2002 - 2003) (with Fiona Xie)
- Singapore Hit Awards 新加坡金曲奖颁奖典礼 (2002)
- Singapore Hit Awards 新加坡金曲奖颁奖典礼 (2003)
- Durian Delights《我吃，你吃，它刺刺刺》(2004) (with Huang Wenyong)
- Singapore Hit Awards 新加坡金曲奖颁奖典礼 (2004)
- Singapore Hit Awards 新加坡金曲奖颁奖典礼 (2005)
- Kungfu Chef《神厨双怪》(2006) (with Chew Chor Meng)
- SuperBand (Season 1)《非常Superband》常驻评判 (2006)
- Fact Or Fiction?《真相大点击》(2006) (with Kym Ng)
- Stock Exchange《好货上门》(2006) (with Patricia Mok)
- Singapore Hit Awards 新加坡金曲奖颁奖典礼 (2006)
- Singapore Hit Awards 新加坡金曲奖颁奖典礼 (2007)
- F&B Heroes《餐饮英雄榜》(2008)
- Buzzing Cashier《抢摊大行动》(2008) (with Kym Ng & Quan Yi Fong)
- Singapore Hit Awards 新加坡金曲奖颁奖典礼 (2008)
- Buzzing Cashier II《抢摊大行动 II》(2009) (with Kym Ng & Quan Yi Fong)
- Paris and Milan (2009)
- Singapore Hit Awards 新加坡金曲奖颁奖典礼 (2009)
- Black Rose (2010)
- Gatekeepers (2010)
- Star Awards 2010 红星大奖 (Show 1) (2010)
- Singapore Hit Awards 新加坡金曲奖颁奖典礼 (2010)
- Small and Beautiful (2011) (channel 5)
- Singapore Hit Awards 新加坡金曲奖颁奖典礼 (2011)
- Black Rose II (2014)
- Halloween Singapore Remake of Comic《中华英雄》(2015)
- Star Awards 2016 红星大奖 (2016)
- Dennis Uncovers 周公找茶 (2018)
- The Love 97.2 Breakfast Quartet 《玉建煌崇电视版2》 (2018) (with Mark Lee & Marcus Chin)
- Kids《看招》(2021)
- Eat Eat Lok Lok《吃吃乐乐》(2021)
- Goggles Life 3 (2021)

== Compilation album ==
Year	English title	Mandarin title
2015	MediaCorp Music Lunar New Year Album 15	新传媒群星金羊添吉祥
2016	MediaCorp Music Lunar New Year Album 16	新传媒群星金猴添喜庆
2017	MediaCorp Music Lunar New Year Album 17	新传媒群星咕鸡咕鸡庆丰年
2018	MediaCorp Music Lunar New Year Album 18	新传媒群星阿狗狗过好年
2019	MediaCorp Music Lunar New Year Album 19	新传媒群星猪饱饱欢乐迎肥年
2020	MediaCorp Music Lunar New Year Album 20	裕鼠鼠纳福迎春了

== Awards and nominations ==
Organisation	Year	Category	Work	Result	Ref
Friday Weekly	2001	Singapore's Top 10 Most Popular DJs	—N/a	Won	
Friday Weekly	2002	Singapore's Top 10 Most Popular DJs	—N/a	Won	
Friday Weekly	2003	Singapore's Top 10 Most Popular DJs	—N/a	Won	
Friday Weekly	2004	Singapore's Top 10 Most Popular DJs	—N/a	Won	
Friday Weekly	2005	Singapore's Top 10 Most Popular DJs	—N/a	Won	
Friday Weekly	2006	Singapore's Top 10 Most Popular DJs	—N/a	Won	
RCS Golden Mike Awards	2000	'Most Friendly' DJ	—N/a	Won	
MediaCorp Radio Golden Mike Awards	2002	'Most Humorous' DJ	—N/a	Won	
MediaCorp Radio Golden Mike Awards	2004	YES 933 Most Popular DJ	—N/a	Won	
MediaCorp Radio Golden Mike Awards	2004	Most Popular Mandarin Stations DJ	—N/a	Won	
Singapore Radio Awards	2007	Radio Personality of the Year (Chinese stations)	—N/a	Won	
Singapore Radio Awards	2010	Chinese stations DJ of the Year (Media's Choice)	—N/a	Won	
Singapore Radio Awards	2011	YES 933 Most Popular DJ	—N/a	Won	
Star Awards	2002	Best Comedy Performer	New Dragon's Inn	Nominated	
Star Awards	2002	Best Variety Show Host	One Fun Day	Nominated	
Star Awards	2002	Top 10 Most Popular Male Artistes	—N/a	Nominated	
Star Awards	2003	Best Variety Show Host	Innocent Moments	Nominated	
Star Awards	2003	Top 10 Most Popular Male Artistes	—N/a	Nominated	
Star Awards	2004	Top 10 Most Popular Male Artistes	—N/a	Nominated	
Star Awards	2005	Top 10 Most Popular Male Artistes	—N/a	Nominated	
Star Awards	2006	Top 10 Most Popular Male Artistes	—N/a	Nominated	
Star Awards	2010	Best Variety Show Host	Paris and Milan	Nominated	
Star Awards	2010	Favourite Female Character	Paris and Milan (as Auntie Lucy)	Nominated	
Star Awards	2010	Favourite Male Character	Paris and Milan (as Foreigner)	Nominated	
Star Awards	2010	Top 10 Most Popular Male Artistes	—N/a	Won	
Star Awards	2011	Top 10 Most Popular Male Artistes	—N/a	Won	
Star Awards	2012	Top 10 Most Popular Male Artistes	—N/a	Won	
Star Awards	2013	Top 10 Most Popular Male Artistes	—N/a	Won	
Star Awards	2014	Best Supporting Actor	The Dream Makers (as Fang Yuanren)	Nominated	
Star Awards	2014	Top 10 Most Popular Male Artistes	—N/a	Won	
Star Awards	2015	Top 10 Most Popular Male Artistes	—N/a	Nominated	
Star Awards	2016	Top 10 Most Popular Male Artistes	—N/a	Won	
Star Awards	2017	Best Comedy Actor (3rd Asia Rainbow TV Awards)	118 (as Wang Shunfeng)	Won	
Star Awards	2017	Top 10 Most Popular Male Artistes	—N/a	Won	
Star Awards	2018	Top 10 Most Popular Male Artistes	—N/a	Won	
Star Awards	2019	Best Programme Host	Dennis Uncovers	Nominated	
Star Awards	2019	Top 10 Most Popular Male Artistes	—N/a	Won	
Star Awards	2021	Best Radio Programme	LOVE 972 - The Breakfast Quartet 早安！玉建煌崇	Won	
Star Awards	2021	Top 10 Most Popular Male Artistes	—N/a	Won	
Star Awards	2022	Best Radio Programme	LOVE 972 - The Breakfast Quartet 早安！玉建煌崇	Won	
Star Awards	2022	Best Radio Programme	Mr Zhou's Ghost Stories 周公讲鬼	Nominated	
Star Awards	2022	Perfect Combo	LOVE 972 - Yujian Huangchong (Weekend Edition) 玉建煌崇 （周末版）	Won	
Star Awards	2022	All-Time Favourite Artiste	—N/a	Won	
Star Awards	2023	Best Radio Programme	LOVE 972 - The Breakfast Quartet 早安！玉建煌崇	Won	
Star Awards	2023	Best Programme Host	Mr Zhou's Ghost Stories @ Singapore Sightings 周公讲鬼,那里有鬼	Nominated	
Star Awards	2024	Best Radio Programme	LOVE 972 - The Breakfast Quintet 早安！玉建蔡煌崇	Won	
Star Awards	2024	Best Audio Personality	The Breakfast Quintet 早安！玉建蔡煌崇	Won	
Star Awards	2025	Best Radio Programme	LOVE 972 - The Breakfast Quintet 早安！玉建煌崇	Nominated	
Star Awards	2025	Best Radio Programme	Mr Zhou's Ghost Stories 周公讲鬼	Nominated	
