= Chen Yi Xi =

Chen Yi Xi may refer to:

- Chin Gee Hee (1844 – 1929), Chinese merchant
- Chen Xi (actor) (born 1991), Singaporean actor formerly known as Chen Yixi
