= While We Are Young =

- Also known as: Generation Z
- Z世代
- Genre: Drama; Romance; School; Youth; Education; Teacher's Day
- Written by: Ng Kah Huay 黄佳华; Ang Chee Chuan 洪志川
- Directed by: Loh Woon Woon 罗温温; Lim Mee Nah 林美娜
- Starring: Zoe Tay; Rebecca Lim; Zhang Zhenhuan; Terence Cao; Denise Camillia Tan; Zong Zijie; Chantalle Ng
- Opening theme: Go Home and Sleep (回家睡觉) by Jayden Chew
- Ending theme: 1) 致爱 by Zong Zijie, Chantalle Ng, Calvert Tay, Joanna Theng, Marcus Guo, Shalynn Tsai & Chen Yixin; 2) 致爱 (Demo Version) by Deng Bi Yuan
- Country of origin: Singapore
- Original language: Chinese
- No. of episodes: 20

Production
- Executive producer: Winnie Wong 王尤红
- Running time: approx. 45 minutes

Original release
- Network: MediaCorp Channel 8
- Release: 6 November – 4 December 2017

While We Are Young (Chinese: Z世代) is a 20 episode Singaporean drama produced and telecast on MediaCorp Channel 8. The show aired at 9 pm on weekdays and had a repeat telecast at 8 am the following day.

The drama series is a production to commemorate 35 years of locally produced Chinese-language dramas and in appreciation to the local educators in celebration of Teacher's Day. It stars Zoe Tay, Rebecca Lim, Zhang Zhenhuan, Terence Cao, Denise Camillia, Zong Zijie and Chantalle Ng.

The show featured several "second-generation" stars who are children of veteran artistes, including Calvert Tay (son of Hong Huifang and Zheng Geping), Chantalle Ng (daughter of Lin Meijiao and her ex-husband former actor Huang Yiliang), Chen Yixin (daughter of Xiang Yun and Edmund Chen), Marcus Guo (son of host Guo Liang), and Shalynn Tsai (daughter of Chen Xiuhuan).

== Cast ==
=== Generation X/Y ===
- Zoe Tay as Fang Ting 方廷
  For the first time in 29 years, Tay played the role of a teacher which incidentally has been her childhood dream. She had previously taken on a variety of roles, but never those of a teacher.
  - Alicia Lo as young Fang Ting
- Rebecca Lim as Zhong Ai 钟爱
- Zhang Zhenhuan as Tang Yiwei 汤一伟
- Terence Cao as Bai Jinshun 白金顺
  - Chen Xi as young Bai Junshun
- Denise Camillia Tan as Zheng Jiayi 郑嘉怡

=== Generation Z ===
- Calvert Tay 郑凯介 as Tang Yijie 汤一杰, Fang Ting's son

Cast	Character	Description
Zong Zijie	Yang Xiaoshuai 杨小帅	Younger version portrayed by Perez Tay (郑传峻): Ex-convict; Yang Shanhe's son; Ben's nephew; Zhong Ai's adopted son; Huang Li Bai Yun's love interest; Tang Yijie's rival in love; Dream is to be a professional Swimmer
Chantalle Ng	Huang Li Bai Yun 黄李白云	Alan's stepdaughter; Fu Xiuqin's daughter; Bai Jinshun's niece; In love with Yang Xiaoshuai; Tang Yijie's love interest; Dream is to be a Television director
Joanna Theng 唐舒恩	Zhou Xuanxuan 周轩轩	Junior College Student Year 2 (Zhuo Yue Junior College); In love with Tang Yijie; Dream is to be a Theater Performer
Marcus Guo 郭麦洋	Kang Lele 康乐乐	Junior College Student (Zhuo Yue Junior College); Dream is to be a PE Teacher
Shalynn Tsai 蔡绮耘	Luo Yiling 罗依玲	Junior College Student (Zhuo Yue Junior College); In love with Tang Yijie; Suffered from hurtful comments given by Tang Yijie and Xu Tiancai and attempted suicide
Gary Tan 陈毅丰	Lin Junkai 林俊凯	Dream is to be a blogger
Chen Yixin 陈一心	Hong Yuanyuan 洪媛媛	Dream is to be a Singer
Shanice Koh 许舒宁	Ren Youwan 任游玩	Ren Chuan and Li Xue's daughter; Junior College Student (Zhuo Yue Junior College); Dream is to be a Model; Suffered from stress disorder and begin to self-harm
Li Decheng 李德承	Xu Tiancai 许天才	Yu Feng's son; Junior College Student (Zhuo Yue Junior College); Dream is to be a Gamemaker

=== Zhou Yue Junior College Staff(s) ===
Cast	Character	Description
Marcus Mok 莫健发	Old Principal 老院长	Old Principal of Zhuo Yue Junior College
Li Fuliang 李福樑	New Principal 新院长	Principal He (何院长): New Principal of Zhuo Yue Junior College
Kenneth Kong 江坚文	Discipline Master 训育主任	Discipline Master of Zhuo Yue Junior College
Rebecca Lim	Zhong Ai 钟爱	Ms Zhong (钟老师): HOD of Chinese Department of Zhuo Yue Junior College; See Generation X/Y
Li Wenhai	Zhuo Zigan 卓子乾	Mr Zhuo (卓老师): Chinese Teacher of Zhuo Yue Junior College
Chen Ning 陈宁	Guo Liwen 郭丽雯	Ms Guo (郭老师): Chinese Teacher of Zhuo Yue Junior College

=== Other Casts ===
Cast	Character	Description
Joshua Chia 謝樂	Cai Yaozu 蔡耀祖	Junior College Ex-Student (Zhuo Yue Junior College); Take video in the girl's toilet and was caught by Zhou Xuanxuan; Arrested for abusing boarding pass to meet his idol
Adele Wong	Ah Jie 阿姐	TV Station's actress
Hu Wensui 胡问遂	Alan	Villain: Fu Xiuqin's husband; Huang Li Baiyun's stepfather
Teo Ser Li 张思丽	Fu Xiuqin 傅秀琴	Alan's wife; Huang Li Baiyun's mother; Bai Jinshun's sister-in-law
Jazreel Low 刘琦	Rose	Fang Ting's best friend
Authur Choo 朱锐雄	Ah Hao 阿豪	Villain: Car Mechanic's ex-employee; Tang Yiwei and Zheng Jiayi's colleague; In love with Zheng Jiayi
Shane Tan Yu Xuan 陈宇轩	Sunny	Yang Xiaoshuai's swimming instructor
Cassandra See 薛淑珊	Mary	Villain: Threatened Yang Xiaoshuai to upload his nude photos if he doesn't agree her to meet other rich sugar mummies
Andi Lim 林伟文	Ben	Supporting Villain: Yang Xiaoshuai's uncle
Kenneth Chung 钟坤华	Kun Hua 坤华	YES 933's Radio DJ; Fang Ting's ex-student
Steven Chiang 江常輝	Yang Shanhe 杨山河	Gang leader; Yang Xiaoshuai's father; Zhong Ai's ex-lover; (Deceased – mentioned by Zhong Ai)
Ye Xiangling 葉向玲	Li Xue 李雪	Ren Chuan's wife; Ren Youwan's mother; Manipulating Youwan’s life, causing her deep injuries
Seth Ang 翁兴昂	Ren Chuan 任川	Li Xue's husband; Ren Youwan's father
Chen Waiwai 陈慧慧	Yu Feng 玉凤	Xu Tiancai's mother
Lu Guanyao 卢冠耀	Mr Luo 罗先生	Luo Yiling's father
Nico Chua 蔡伟彬	Mrs Luo 罗太太	Luo Yiling's mother
Tay Ying 郑颖		Sign up for Modelling Agency with Ren Youwan
Zeng Hanrong 曾汉荣	Gary	Huang Li Baiyun's teacher
Cansen Goh 吴开深	Mr Zhou 周先生	Mr Zhou (周先生): Zhou Xuanxuan's father
Larry Low 刘龙伟	Tony	Fang Ting and Bai Jinshun's ex-JC classmate
Zack Lim 林志强	Xiao Kedou 小蝌蚪	Fang Ting and Bai Jinshun's ex-JC classmate
Joy Yak 易凌	Lin Qingxia 林青霞	Fang Ting and Bai Jinshun's ex-JC classmate
Lin Peifang 林佩芳	Ms Wu 吴老师	Fang Ting, Bai Jinshun, Xiao Kedou, Lin Qingxia and other Ex-JC classmates JC teacher
Wauren Beh 马纬翰	Jon	Villain: Xu Tiancai's friend; Conned Xu Tiancai's money and manipulates Xu Tiancai's mother
Brendon Kuah 柯迪宏	Ray	Villain Peeping Tom (偷窥狂): Property Agent; Installed a hidden camera in Huang Li Baiyun's room and manipulates Bai Jinshun
Tao Li 陶李	Herself	A professional Singapore swimmer; Yang Xiaoshuai's idol

== Original Sound Track (OST) ==
No.	Song title	Singer(s)
1)	回家睡觉 (Main Song for the series)	Jayden Chew 周俊安
2)	致爱	Zong Zijie 宗子杰; Chantalle Ng 黄暄婷; Calvert Tay 郑凯介; Joanna Theng 唐舒恩; Marcus Guo 郭麦洋; Shalynn Tsai 蔡绮耘; Chen Yixin 陈一心
3)	致爱 (Demo Version)	Deng Bi Yuan 邓碧源

== Awards and nominations ==
Year	Organisation	Nominees	Category	Result
2018	Star Awards	Loh Woon Woon	Best Director	Nominated
2018	Star Awards	Chantalle Ng	Best Newcomer	Won
2018	Star Awards	Zong Zijie	Best Newcomer	Nominated
2018	Star Awards	Zoe Tay	Best Actress	Nominated
2018	Star Awards	—N/a	Best Drama Serial	Nominated

== Production ==
Filming began in May and wrapped in July 2017, with the major scene taken at Nanyang Junior College. The series is the first to cover Singapore's post-secondary education landscape.

== See also ==
- List of MediaCorp Channel 8 Chinese drama series (2010s)
