= Mr. Mystery =

Book series by James Lee

Mr Mystery
- Author: James Lee
- Original title: Mr Mystery
- Language: English
- Genre: Mystery
- Publisher: Angsana Books, Flame Of The Forest Publishing (flameoftheforest.com)
- Publication date: 2006 (Earliest, Mr Mystery #1); 2020 (Latest, Mr Mystery #30)
- Publication place: Singapore

Mr Mystery is a mystery-fiction book series written by Jim Aitchison under the pseudonym of James Lee (also the author of the Mr. Midnight series). Unlike Mr. Midnight, it has a fixed group of main characters. The series is published by Angsana Books, Flame Of The Forest Publishing. 36 books in the series, including 6 Special Edition titles, have been published.

== Plot ==
The story is about several friends who run a detective company, named Soh & Co, in an old storeroom behind Alvin Soh's mother's jewelry shop. A large sign hangs outside proudly proclaiming:

SOH & CO
INVESTIGATORS
We investigate anything
No case too big or too small

They are frequently roped into solving crimes that baffle the police by their suspicious clients, which is frowned upon by their friend in the police, Sergeant Soo, as well as Alvin's mother, Gracie Soh. They are both worried about safety since Alvin’s father was murdered.

== Characters ==
=== Main characters ===
- Alvin Soh: He is the main protagonist in Mr. Mystery. He lives with his mother, Gracie Soh. His gel-slicked hair is always cut very short at the sides, which seems to make his ears stick out. In The Mystery of the Sydney Slayings, he learns that his father was murdered by The Snake.
- Tan Wei Ling: She has a collection of criminal files in their headquarters. She became jealous when Alvin became close to Tai, The Snake's daughter. She has a prominent beauty spot on one cheek. She always wears a white t-shirt and blue jeans(except in the 2nd and in the end of the 10th book, where she wore a white polo shirt and a red halter neck dress respectively). In The Mystery of the Unlucky Undertaker, Wei Ling has a new boyfriend, Tony Hall. In The Mystery of the Bolting Burglar, it is hinted that she might have a new boyfriend called Tomas.
- Rafferty "Rafe" Lim: He is Alvin's best friend and his senior investigator. He is so handsome that he looks like a member of a boy band. He is also Mars Wong's boyfriend. In The Mystery of the Rajah's Ruby, it is revealed that he can fly a plane.
- Mars Wong: She is a beautiful girl and is Rafe's girlfriend. She is close to Tan Wei Ling and Sabrina Sim, a girl who is not an investigator. She is the one who found out Tai is actually The Snake's daughter. Before she started dating Rafe, she had a boyfriend, Edmund Lim (The Mystery of the Eagle's Eye).
- Azizul: He always wears a cap. Azizul enjoys teasing Wei Ling just to see her beauty spot bob up and down. He has a girlfriend, Farisha, but she is not an investigator. Fishing is his favourite hobby.
- Sinchita: Sinchita can draw very well. She has a cat, Kuching. Sinchita believes relationships do not last long, just like what happened to her father and mother. In The Mystery of the Seventh Sword, she is unintentionally poisoned by The Snake, after she cut her finger with the poisoned envelope meant for Alvin, slipping into a coma. In the next book, The Mystery of the Missing Murderer, she died, leaving only five investigators in the team.
- Tony Hall: Tony likes to surf. He became Wei Ling's boyfriend in The Mystery of the Unlucky Undertaker. He is very patient and always holds up for Alvin. He becomes part of the group in The Mystery of the Clueless Corpse. Tony has not appeared since The Mystery of the Murdered Maid when he went back to America, meaning that he might have left the group permanently.
- Arpeeta: Arpeeta is Sinchita's younger sister and has waited a long time to join Alvin's group of investigators. She first appears, and becomes part of the group, in The Mystery of the Clownish Corpse. She is shown to have a good singing voice (The Mystery of the Christmas Carol), and also writes poetry (The Mystery of the Bothered Brother).

=== Minor characters ===
- Sergeant Samuel Soo: He was friends with Alan Soh, Alvin's father. Sergeant Soo always helps Alvin in his investigations, whether he likes it or not. He became protective towards Alvin and his team after he learned that Alan was murdered by The Snake. He has a romantic relationship with Gracie Soh, and they become engaged in The Mystery of the Dead Diva.
- Gracie Soh: Alvin's mother, who owns a jewelry shop. She is often worried about Alvin's safety during his investigations, especially after she finds out how Alan Soh and Sinchita were killed.
- The Snake: Master criminal, leader of the city's largest crime syndicate. Alvin's deadliest enemy. He always wears a green reptile mask. He is extremely dangerous and always tries to get rid of Alvin and his team as they always outsmart him. In The Mystery of the Rajah's Ruby, it is revealed he has a daughter, Tai.
- Tai: The Snake's daughter. Her full name is Tai Pan, based on a poisonous snake. She is very beautiful, and Alvin used to date her until Mars gave him a warning. Tai often goes against her father's will and warns Alvin about the danger that's coming, causing her father to question her loyalty in The Mystery of the Man Who Had to Die. She was killed by a French criminal in The Mystery of the Gangster's Gun.
- Cordelia Chew: Mars' friend. She tries to get Alvin to be her boyfriend in The Mystery of the Terrified Teacher. Both Alvin and Tony are infatuated by her.
- Alan Soh: Alvin's father and an amateur detective who was killed by the Snake.
- Farisha: Azizul's girlfriend. She lives next door to Azizul.

== Books ==
The latest book in the Mr Mystery series is Mr Mystery #30, The Mystery Of The Missing Motive.

The Complete List
Book	Released	Title	Synopsis
1	3 March 2006	The Mystery Of The White Tiger	Someone is about to kill an escaped convict.
2	26 May 2006	The Mystery Of The Missing Movie	The investigators get caught up in a case of an unsolved murder, and millions of dollars.
3	15 September 2006	The Mystery Of The Rajah's Ruby	An old enemy tries to get the Rajah's Ruby.
4	19 January 2007	The Mystery Of The Purple Pop Star	A pop star disappears before a concert.
5	4 May 2007	The Mystery Of The Eagle's Eye	An eagle was stolen from the house of Professor Julius Jung.
6	4 May 2007	The Mystery Of The Runaway Rebel	A powerful general is looking for a boy, who is a liar and a thief.
7	7 September 2007	The Mystery Of The Boy Who Never Was	Criminals are looking for the Silver Begging Bowl and one of Mars' friends has a new boyfriend.
8	18 January 2008	The Mystery Of The Sydney Slayings	On vacation in Sydney, Alvin and his investigators stumble upon a murder.
9	6 June 2008	The Mystery Of The Seventh Sword	Mr Tarquin Tarn receives pictures of swords arriving at different times and gets a threat that he will die when the picture of the seventh sword arrives. Sinchita, one of the investigators, slips into a coma after being cut by a poisoned envelope sent by The Snake which is meant for Alvin.
10	29 August 2008	The Mystery Of The Missing Murderer	A man who has been framed for murder by his own family asks Alvin to clear his name and prove his innocence. However, evidence against him keeps on piling up.
11	28 November 2008	The Mystery Of The Man Who Had To Die	Alvin is asked to find a missing security guard named Albert Tien by his sister, Flora Tien. Meanwhile, someone is following Alvin and watching him.
12	19 January 2009	The Mystery Of The Body in the Bath	A rich business man has been shot dead in his bath. Meanwhile, Alvin has to wrestle with another mystery of who Tony is and why he is with Wei Ling.
13	15 May 2009	The Mystery Of The Unlucky Undertaker	An undertaker was stabbed to death in a mortuary while he was embalming a corpse.
14	20 November 2009	The Mystery Of The Clueless Corpse	When a headless body is found in a park, Alvin is determined to bring the killer to justice. But without a single clue to work on, his reputation is on the line.
15	4 June 2010	The Mystery Of The Bungling Baker	The body of a baker is found dead, stuffed inside a cupboard of a restaurant in a five-star hotel.
16	24 September 2010	The Mystery Of The Terrified Teacher	Alvin's art teacher is shot dead the night after he hires Alvin.
SE 1	19 November 2010	The Mystery Of The Christmas Killer	At a department store, a gangster dressed as Santa Claus is shot dead.
17	26 January 2011	The Mystery Of The Jealous Jeweler	A famous jeweler is found murdered at a jewelry fair.
18	27 May 2011	The Mystery Of The Friendless Fisherman	Alvin and Azizul fish a corpse from the waters.
19	16 September 2011	The Mystery Of The Museum Murder	A poison dart kills a man at the museum at midnight.
20	24 June 2012	The Mystery Of The Gangster's Gun	The Snake hires Alvin to prove his innocence after three gangsters were shot dead using his gun.
SE 2	14 September 2012	The Mystery Of The Man in the Mask	A man wearing a Halloween mask, is on the loose killing people for no apparent reason.
21	30 May 2013	The Mystery Of The Murdered Maid	A Millionaire's/Billionaire's maid is shot and the family members start blaming one another for her death.
22	20 September 2013	The Mystery Of The Dead Diva	A famous young singer, J'aime was found strangled in her dressing room.
SE 3	21 November 2013	The Mystery Of The Suspicious Santa	An old man dressed as Santa is found dead on a roof.
23	4 February 2014	The Mystery Of The Bolting Burglar	A burglar surprises his friends when he vanishes into thin air. Murder is at the heart of the mystery.
SE 4	4 December 2014	The Mystery Of The Christmas Crimes	A gangster was brutally murdered in a deserted mall. His death was seemingly linked to gangsters plotting crimes during the festive season
24	11 October 2015	The Mystery Of The Clownish Corpse	A Corpse turned up dressed in a clown costume for no inexplicable reason.
SE 5	24 November 2016	The Mystery Of The Christmas Carol	"The Twelve Days of Christmas" - once a popular Christmas carol has becomes a deadly crime wave that put the investigators against the mysterious Bamboo Dragons.
25	4 May 2017	The Mystery Of The Foolish Forger	Alvin's team of investigators is hired to find a missing man. But what seems a simple case soon turns into a double mystery.
SE 6	1 December 2017	The Mystery Of The Christmas Cruise	When Alvin and his team of investigators sail off on a Christmas cruise, murder is the last thing they expected.
26	1 June 2018	The Mystery Of The Bothered Brother	Arthur See's younger brother died 20 years ago. But now Mr See, who is a very rich man, believes his sibling is still alive.
27	7 June 2019	The Mystery Of The Doctor's Double	Dr Chan is a famous heart surgeon. But why is somebody impersonating him—somebody who looks exactly like him?
28	6 December 2019	The Mystery Of The Troublesome Tailor	Who murdered tailor Samuel Fong? Was he really an innocent victim, or was he secretly a criminal leading a dangerous double life?
29	27 January 2020	The Mystery Of The Poisoned Professor	Who murdered Professor Phua? Was it his young assistant, or was the professor the victim of a killer in search of ancient Egyptian relics?
30	27 November 2020	The Mystery Of The Missing Motive	Who murdered billionaire Marcus Wong? Why weren’t his art treasures stolen? Did Wong’s killer have a more mysterious motive in mind?
