= Mr. Midnight: Beware the Monsters =

Television series

- Genre: Horror Comedy
- Based on: Mr. Midnight by James Lee
- Directed by: Tony Tilse; Sean Masterson; Chai Yee Wei
- Starring: Idan Aedan; Chen Yixin; Caleb Monk; Nikki Dekker; (See below)
- Original language: English
- No. of seasons: 1
- No. of episodes: 13

Production
- Production company: Beach House Pictures

Original release
- Network: Netflix
- Release: 24 October 2022

Mr. Midnight: Beware the Monsters is a Netflix series produced by Beach House Pictures. It is an adaptation of the popular Singaporean book series Mr. Midnight by James Lee. It premiered on 24 October 2022.

== Background ==
The Mr. Midnight book series consists of 134 books, including 28 special edition copies.

The books have been translated into Burmese, Malay, Indonesian, and Chinese.

== Plot ==
A group of detective friends solve strange, paranormal and extra-terrestrial occurrences in their town, Tanah Merah. They record their experiences in their blog titled "Mr. Midnight".

== Cast ==
- Idan Aedan as Tyar
- Chen Yixin as Ling
- Caleb Monk as Nat
- Nikki Dekker as Zoe
- Lim Yu-Beng as Uncle Tan (Ling's father)
- Adinia Wirasti as Sylvia & Hutan lahir
- Sam Pleitgen as Jimmy K (Ben's father)
- Shafiqhah Efandi as Zihan (Tyar's mother)
- Firdaus Rahman as Lufti (Tyar's father)
- Maxime Bouttier as Ben

== Episodes ==
No.	Title	Directed by	Written by	Original release date
1	"The Sleepers are Awake"	Unknown	Unknown	October 24, 2022
2	"The Haunted Hotel"	Unknown	Unknown	October 24, 2022
3	"Who Else is in My House"	Unknown	Unknown	October 24, 2022
4	"Buried But Breathing"	Unknown	Unknown	October 24, 2022
5	"My Class Vampire"	Unknown	Unknown	October 24, 2022
6	"The Man from Fisherman's Village"	Unknown	Unknown	October 24, 2022
7	"Cinema of Doom"	Unknown	Unknown	October 24, 2022
8	"Beware the Gravediggers"	Unknown	Unknown	October 24, 2022
9	"Dead Write"	Unknown	Unknown	October 24, 2022
10	"May All Your Dreams Come True"	Unknown	Unknown	October 24, 2022
11	"Dressed to Kill"	Unknown	Unknown	October 24, 2022
12	"Forest of Fear"	Unknown	Unknown	October 24, 2022
13	"Stay in Your Grave"	Unknown	Unknown	October 24, 2022

== Production ==
In October 2018, Beach House Pictures announced that the series was in production and that it would feature "stories inspired by the books". Filming was conducted in Batam and Singapore in a "‘90s gothic-style setting".

== Reception ==
Fans of the book series took to social media to comment on the lack of promotion for the series. Twitter users expressed hopes that the would be greater promotion and said that they had been unaware about the series.
