= Echoing Love =

- Directed by: Edmund Chen; Xiang Yun; Erica Lee; Vincent Ng; Alaric Tay
- Produced by: Edmund Chen
- Starring: Huang Yiliang; Xiang Yun; Chen Xi; Chen Yixin; Alaric Tay; Vincent Ng; Jiu Jian; Lai Meiqi
- Production companies: Clover Films mm2 Entertainment
- Release date: 2011
- Country: Singapore
- Language: Mandarin

Echoing Love (Chinese: 爱情六重奏), is a 2011 Singaporean anthology film directed by Edmund Chen, Xiang Yun, Erica Lee, Vincent Ng and Alaric Tay. The film won the Special Achievement award at the 2011 Singapore International Film Festival.

== Cast ==
- Huang Yiliang
- Xiang Yun
- Chen Xi
- Chen Yixin
- Alaric Tay
- Vincent Ng
- Jiu Jian
- Lai Meiqi
- Ezann Lee

== Release ==
The film was screened at the 2011 Singapore International Film Festival and the fifth International Chinese Film Festival in Sydney. It did not receive a theatrical release.
