= Zong Zijie =

Chinese actor (born 1996)

- Born: 20 February 1996 (age 30); Fujian, China
- Education: Bedok View Secondary School
- Occupation: Actor
- Years active: 2009−present
- Agent: NoonTalk Media

Chinese name
- Traditional Chinese: 宗子傑
- Simplified Chinese: 宗子杰
- Hanyu Pinyin: Zōng Zijié

Zong Zijie (born 20 February 1996) is a Chinese actor based in Singapore. He starred in While We Are Young in 2017.

== Early life and education ==
Zong was born in China and moved to Singapore when he was 6 years old. He studied in Bedok View Secondary School.

== Career ==
In 2009, 13-year-old Zong made his television debut in a local television series My School Daze. Since then, Zong has been cast in a number of television productions including Star Awards 2016 top-rated series Tiger Mum.

In 2014, Zong joined Dasmond Koh's company, Noontalk Media, to support his career.

Zong was nominated for the Star Awards for Best Newcomer in 2018 for his work in While We Are Young where he played the lead role.

== Personal life ==
In 2026, Zong was fined and given a driving ban for speeding.

== Filmography ==
=== Television series ===
Year	Title	Role	Notes	Ref
2009	My School Daze	Jiang Jun		
2010	Nonya Kin			
2010	Mrs P.I.	Tianyang		
2012	Beyond	Mingyao		
2013	The Dream Makers	Edmund	Cameo	
2013	C.L.I.F. 3	Bernard		
2013	Against the Tide	Di Shen		
2014	In the Name of Love	Pan Zhihai		
2014	Gonna Make It		Cameo	
2014	The Journey: Tumultuous Times	Teenage Hu Jia/ Zhang Jia	Cameo	
2015	Good Luck	Lin Shijie	Cameo	
2015	Tiger Mum	Darren Liu	Cameo	
2015	Second Chance	James		
2016	C.L.I.F. 4	Liang Dexun		
2017	2589 Days Apart	Elvis Zhang Aiwei		
2017	My Teacher Is A Thug	Teenage Jia Tianxiong	Cameo	
2017	While We Are Young	Yang Xiaoshuai		
2018	118 Reunion	Sun Zikang		
2018	Say Cheese	Zhong Bowen		
2018	Stars Crossed	Gav Goh		
2019	Wonder Kiss	Jay Zheng Junjie		
2019	The Good Fight	Zhuang Wenkai		
2020	Victory Lap	You Yixiang		
2021	Crouching Tiger Hidden Ghost	Zhang Bao Lun		
2021	The Heartland Hero	Teenage Li Xiaofeng		
2022	Truths About Us	Li Siyang		
2022	Your World in Mine	Zheng Tianwei		
2023	Mr Zhou's Ghost stories @ Job Haunting II	Ah Teck		
2023	The Sky is Still Blue	Li Weidong		
2023	I Do, Do I?	Johan		
2024	Coded Love	Lucas		
2024	If Tomorrow Comes	Liu Yanmin		
2025	Provocative	Caleb Chan		

=== Film ===
Year	Title	Role	Ref
2024	The Chosen One	Li Yuanjie	

== Awards and nominations ==
Year	Ceremony	Category	Nominated work	Result	Ref
2018	Star Awards	Best Newcomer	While We Are Young (as Yang Xiaoshuai)	Nominated	
2021	Star Awards	Top 10 Most Popular Male Artistes	—N/a	Nominated	
2023	Star Awards	Top 10 Most Popular Male Artistes	—N/a	Nominated	
2024	Star Awards	Top 10 Most Popular Male Artistes	—N/a	Nominated	
2025	Star Awards	Top 10 Most Popular Male Artistes	—N/a	Won	
