= Patrol (TV series) =

Singapore Television series

- 铁警雄风
- Genre: Police procedural
- Created by: Jiang Long 江龙
- Written by: Ng Kah Huay 黄佳华; Ang Eng Tee
- Starring: Edmund Chen; Xiang Yun; Zoe Tay
- Opening theme: 《铁警雄风》 by Jiang Hu (姜鄠)
- Ending theme: 《在乎与不在乎之间》 by Jiang Hu & Zeng Qing Ling (姜鄠/曾庆龄)
- Country of origin: Singapore
- Original language: Mandarin
- No. of episodes: 20

Production
- Running time: approx. 45 minutes

Original release
- Network: SBC 8th Frequency
- Release: 24 April – 19 May 1989

Patrol (Chinese: 铁警雄风; pinyin: tiě jǐng xióng fēng) is a Singaporean action drama produced by Singapore Broadcasting Corporation (SBC) (now MediaCorp) in 1989.

== Plot ==
The series chronicles the lives of several traffic police officers on the job and how they deal with difficult situations.

== Cast ==
- Edmund Chen as Luo Yi Feng 罗一峰
- Xiang Yun as Zhou Hui Juan 周惠娟
- Zoe Tay as Lin Bi Qing 林碧卿
- Chen Anna 陈安娜 as Ma Yu Ru 马玉如
- Yan Bingliang as Ma Biao 马彪
- Huang Shinan 黄世南 as Ji Gang 纪刚
- Sean Say 成建辉 as Bai Qing Shui 白清水
- Liang Weidong 梁维东 as Bai Qing Chi 白清池
- Chen Guohua as Li Mu Quan 李木泉
- Wang Guanwu 王官武 as CID - Ming 明
- Tommy Wong 王昌黎 as CID - Yuan 元
- Zhang Shuifa 张水发 as Michael 迈克
- Yang Junhe 杨竣贺 as Luo Wen Bin 罗文彬
- Zeng Sipei 曾思佩 as Chen Gui Jiao 陈贵娇
- Wu Weiqiang 邬伟强 as Lin Guishan 林贵山
- Li Gongyu 李功玉 as Li Ping 李萍
- Richard Low as A Yong 阿勇
- Chen Xiang 陈翔 as Xiao Yang 小扬
- Lin Jinchi 林金池 as William
- He Qitang 何其糖 as Peter 彼得
- Lin Guiye 林桂叶 as Chen Ma Li 陈玛莉
- Zhong Shurong 钟树荣 as Zhang Jin Shi 张金狮
- Lai Xianghua 赖向华 as Zhu Yong Tai 朱永泰
- Su Feifeng 苏飞凤 as Yong Tai's Grandma 永泰婆婆
- Chen Hanwei as Student 留学生 (Cameo Appearance 客串)
- Huang Biren as Student 留学生 (Cameo Appearance 客串)

== Significance ==
Patrol featured the early appearances of young SBC actors such as Xiang Yun, Edmund Chen, Zoe Tay, Chen Hanwei and Huang Biren who would go on to become some of MediaCorp's most prolific artistes of their generation winning numerous awards and nominations at the Star Awards. This series was one of Ang Eng Tee's early works; he would go on to produce popular and critically acclaimed dramas such as Holland V, The Little Nyonya, Together and Breakout. This was also the series that have led Xiang Yun and Edmund Chen being together and got married less than two months after first meeting on set.

It was one of the early police procedural drama series featuring the Singapore Police Force.
