= Life Less Ordinary (TV series) =

- Also known as: Ready Go!
- 小人物向前冲
- Genre: Family; Romance; Dramedy; Socio-Drama
- Written by: Seah Choon Guan
- Directed by: Png Keh Hock; Qiu Jian Ting; Guo Hong Ren; Gao Shu Yi; Zhang Huiying; Loh Woon Woon; Loo Yin Kam; Foo Seng Peng; Lin Mingzhe; Cheong Yuan Teng; Oh Liangcai
- Starring: Xiang Yun; Chen Liping; Romeo Tan; Felicia Chin; Jeffrey Xu; Ian Fang; Bonnie Loo; Jayley Woo; Aileen Tan
- Opening theme: Life Less Ordinary (小人物向前冲) by Life Less Ordinary ensemble
- Ending theme: 1) 是不是 by Roy Li; 2) 等爱 (Waiting for Love) by Romeo Tan & Felicia Chin; 3) 小人物的心声 by Wu Jiaming
- Country of origin: Singapore
- Original languages: Mandarin, with some English dialogue
- No. of episodes: 130

Production
- Executive producer: Jasmine Woo 邬毓琳

Original release
- Network: Mediacorp Channel 8
- Release: October 2, 2017 – March 30, 2018

Related
- Mightiest Mother-in-Law (2017)

Life Less Ordinary (Chinese: 小人物向前冲) is a 130 episode drama series produced by Mediacorp Channel 8. It stars Xiang Yun, Chen Liping, Romeo Tan, Felicia Chin, Jeffrey Xu, Ian Fang, Bonnie Loo, Jayley Woo and Aileen Tan as the casts of this series.

The show replaced the second half of the 7.00 pm drama timeslot, airing weekdays from October 2, 2017, 7.30 pm to 8.00 pm on weekdays making it the 5th long form half an hour drama airing together with news-current affairs programme Hello Singapore at 6.30pm.

== Cast ==
=== Liu (Lianhua) Family ===
Cast	Role	Description
Jin Yinji 金银姬	Liu Lianhua 刘莲花	Aunty Lian (莲姨): Wu Xiaoqiao and Wu Dazhi's mother; Wang Xueling's mother-In-law; Wu Yuxin's paternal grandmother; Suffered from minor stroke and heart attack caused by Wu Dazhi and Wang Xueling
Xiang Yun 向云	Wu Xiaoqiao 吴小巧	Teenage version portrayed by Li Jiaxi (黎嘉希); Sister Qiao (巧姐), Vainpot (乔婆): Liu Lianhua's daughter; Wu Dazhi's elder sister; Wang Xueling's sister-in-law; Wu Yuxin's aunt; Li Zhengye's girlfriend; Chen Feng's best friend and neighbour; Chen Yalong's adoptive mother; Song Jueming's ex-girlfriend; Zhang Ruoyun's rival in love; Holi Hamper's supervisor
Rayson Tan 陈泰铭	Wu Dazhi 吴大志	Villain but later repented Mr Wu (吴经理), Little Fat Cat (小肥猫): Wang Xueling's husband; Wu Yuxin's father; Liu Lianhua's son; Wu Xiaoqiao's younger Brother; Holi Hamper's manager (Packaging Department)
Adele Wong 王筱惠	Wang Xueling 王雪玲	Villain but later repented Wendy Wang, Mrs Goh (吴太太): Wu Dazhi's wife; Wu Yuxin's mother; Liu Lianhua's daughter-in-law; Wu Xiaoqiao's Sister-in-law
Audrey Soh 苏怡妃	Wu Yuxin 吴予鑫	Zania Goh, Baby (宝贝): Wu Dazhi & Wang Xueling's daughter; Liu Lianhua's granddaughter; Wu Xiaoqiao's niece; Adam Bin Mohammed's classmate

=== Chen (Feng) Family ===
Cast	Role	Description
Chen Tianwen 陈天文	Curry Puff 咖哩角	Ex-Convict; Chen Yalong's father; Chen Feng's ex-boyfriend
Chen Liping 陈莉萍	Chen Feng 陈凤	Teenage version portrayed by Caryn Cheng (荘微霓); Sister Feng (凤姐), The Mad One (疯婆子): Chen Yalong's mother; Curry Puff's ex-girlfriend; Wu Xiaoqiao's best friend and neighbour; Song Jueming's girlfriend; Ex-Convict; Holi Hamper supervisor (Packaging Department)
Romeo Tan 陈罗密欧	Chen Yalong 陈亚龙	Younger version portrayed by Estovan Cheah Geylang (芽笼): Chen Feng and Curry Puff's son; Wu Xiaoqiao's adopted son; Lin Shuqi's boyfriend; Xu Tao's rival in love; In love with Jesse Leong; Jesse Leong's love interest; Has Asperger syndrome; Had a brain tumor after being pushed by Xu Tao down the slope; Was punched by Xu Tao at a wall after breaking up with Lin Shuqi; Holi Hamper employee (packaging department)

=== (Rashid) Bin Mohammed Family ===
Cast	Role	Description
Suhaimi Yusof	Rashid Bin Mohamed	Abang (老公): Liew Xiuqin's husband; Adam Bin Mohamed's father; Liew Aisha's foster father; Liew Xiuling's brother-in-law; Holli Hamper's full-time driver (Delivery Department)
Aileen Tan 陈丽贞	Liew Xiuqin 吕秀琴	Sayang (老婆), Auntie Radio (Radio嫂), 八卦婆 (Aunty Busybody), Fatimah: Coffeeshop's lady boss; Rashid Bin Mohamed's wife; Liew Aisha's mother; Liew Xiuling's younger sister; Liang Wenqing and Liang Wenjie's aunt; Adam Bin Mohamed's foster mother
Chen Fengling 陈凤凌	Liew Xiuling 吕秀玲	Liew Xiuqin's elder sister; Liang Wenqing and Liang Wenjie's mother; Liew Aisha's aunt; Rashid Bin Mohamed's sister-in-law
Hayley Woo 胡佳嬑	Liang Wenqing 梁文清	Main Villain but repented: Liew Xiuling's elder daughter; Liang Wenjie's elder sister; Liew Xiuqin's niece; Liew Aisha's cousin; Despise her sister; In love with Li Ziyang; Liang Wenjie and Zhang Qiyuan's rival in love; Lied to Li Ziyang that she is pregnant with child so that he cannot be with Zhang Qiyuan; Pushed Zhang Ruoyun down the stairs and manipulated Liang Wenjie; Turned into the police in Episode 120 after Zhang Qiyuan, Liang Wenjie and Li Ziyang Learnt about her plot of getting closer to Li Ziyang; (Arrested - Episode 120)
Jayley Woo 胡佳琪	Liang Wenjie 梁文洁	Liew Xiuling's younger daughter; Liang Wenqing's younger sister; Liew Xiuqin's niece; Liew Aisha's cousin; Li Ziyang's ex-girlfriend; Zhang Qiyuan and Liang Wenqing's rival in love; Situ Wenjie's girlfriend; Suffered from Dyslexia; Holi Hamper's employee (packaging department)
Lyn Oh 胡菱恩	Liew Aisha 吕爱莎	Former Villain but repented: Liew Xiuqin's daughter; Rashid Bin Mohamed's stepdaughter; Adam Bin Mohamed's step older sister; Liew Xiuling's niece; Liang Wenqing and Liang Wenjie's cousin; Sold fake Song Baojian tickets to Chen Feng, Xiaoyu and Jingwei; Called the police to arrest Rashid Bin Mohammed with a fake story of molest to get rid of him
Muhammad Hermie Latiff	Adam Bin Mohamed	Rashid Bin Mohamed's son; Liew Xiuqin's son; Liew Aisha's younger step-brother; Wu Yuxin's classmate
Chen Xi	Situ Wenjie 司徒文杰	Volunteer, animator and skating instructor; Li Ziyang's best friend; Liang Wenjie's boyfriend; Suffered from strains

=== Zeng (Fuhua) Family ===
Cast	Role	Description
Zhu Xiufeng 朱秀凤	Zeng Fuhua 曾芙花	Semi-Villain but later repented Old Granny (老太婆), Ms Zeng (曾老师), Empress Dowager Cixi (老佛爷): Retired school teacher; Li Zhengye's mother; Zhang Ruoyun's mother-in-law; Li Ziyang's grandmother; Caused Li Ziyang to lose his mother at a very young age
Bernard Tan 陈传之	Li Zhengye 李正业	Teenage Version portrayed by Terence Tay (郑仲伟) Original Name: Li Zhenyan (李振彦); Boss (老板): Zeng Fuhua's son; Zhang Ruoyun's ex-husband; Li Ziyang's father; Wu Xiaoqiao's boyfriend; Holi Hamper's boss
Cynthia Koh 许美珍	Zhang Ruoyun 张若云	Teenage Version portrayed by Joyce Ng (黄婉婷): Li Zhengye's ex-wife; Li Ziyang's mother; Zeng Fuhua's daughter-in-law; Zhang Qiyuan's foster mother; Wu Xiaoqiao rival in love; Suffering from liver cancer; (Deceased-Episode 130)
Ian Fang 方伟杰	Li Ziyang 李梓阳	Younger version portrayed by Perez Tay (郑传峻) Sol Lee, Sorry (对不起), Cactus (仙人掌), Psychopath (变态的), Stalker (阴魂不散): Li Zhengye and Zhang Ruoyun's son; Zeng Fuhua's grandson; Zhang Qiyuan's elder foster-brother and boyfriend; Liang Wenjie's ex-boyfriend; Liang Wenqing's love interest; Chen Feng's co-tenant; Situ Wenjie's best friend; Holi Hamper's employee (Packaging Department), small boss
Bonnie Loo 罗美仪	Zhang Qiyuan 张奇缘	Taekwondo Expert (跆拳道冠军), Tom Boy (男人婆), Cold Shoulder Sister (冷淡姐姐), Frozen Qiyuan (冰雪奇缘): Zhang Ruoyun's foster daughter; Li Ziyang's foster younger sister and girlfriend; Liang Wenjie and Liang Wenqing's rival in love; Wu Xiaoqiao's co-tenant

=== Xu (Tao) Family ===
Cast	Role	Description
Jeffrey Xu 徐鸣杰	Xu Tao 徐涛	Villain but later repented Baby (宝贝), Lazybum (寄生虫), Handsome (帅呆): Holli Hamper's part-time driver (Delivery Department); Ex-actor/celebrity; Came from Shanghai, China; Lin Shuqi's ex-husband; Chen Yalong's rival in love; Was the one who caused Chen Yalong a brain tumor after pushing him down the slope; Punched Chen Yalong at a wall after learning about him breaking up with Lin Shuqi
Felicia Chin 陈凤玲	Lin Shuqi 林书琦	Jelly Lin, Baby (宝贝), Frangipani Flower (鸡蛋花): Holli Hamper's employee (Packaging Department); Came from Ipoh, Malaysia; Xu Tao's ex-wife; Chen Yalong's girlfriend; Jesse Leong's rival in love

=== Song (Jueming) Family ===
Cast	Role	Description
Guo Liang 郭亮	Song Jueming 宋觉明	Villain but later repented Teenage Version portrayed by Benjamin Tan (陈俊铭); Peter (彼德), Peter Pan (彼德·潘), Benefactor (救命恩人), Swindler (骗子): Song Baojian's uncle; Chen Feng's boyfriend; Wu Xiaoqiao's ex-boyfriend; Liu Yingjun's rival in love
Richie Koh 许瑞奇	Song Baojian 宋宝剑	Song Bogum, Song Jiji (宋基基), Teens Idol (小鲜肉), Oppa (欧巴): South Korea's Celebrity; Song Jueming's nephew; Chen Feng's idol

=== Holli Hamper Company ===
Cast	Role	Description
Rebecca Lim	Jesse Leong	The Goddess (女神), Lily Flower (百合花): Holli Hamper's manager (Sales & Purchasing Department)
Chen Zhiqiang 陈志强	Cai Zhongxing 蔡忠兴	Uncle Xing (兴叔): Holli Hamper's senior employee (Packaging Department); Cai Weixiong's father
Stella Tan 陈湘榕	Jing Wei 静微	Holli Hamper's employee (Packaging Department)
Laura Kee 纪丽晶	Xiao Yu 小羽	Holli Hamper's employee (Packaging Department)
Prathabini 宾妮	Diya	Jasmine Flower (茉莉花): Holli Hamper's employee (Sales Department); Zhang Qiyuan's taekwondo friend; In love with Xu Tao

=== Cameo appearance ===
Cast	Role	Description
Henry Thia 程旭辉	Liu Yingjun 刘英俊	Shorty (矮冬瓜): Xu Tao and Lin Shuqi's old co-tenant; In love with Chen Feng; Song Jueming's rival in love
Eric Lee 李永和	Alan	Mentally Unstable Villain: In love with Zhang Qiyuan; Create a fake funbook page of Zhang Qiyuan and stalk her wherever she goes and manipulated Li Ziyang; (Arrested - Episode 25)
Alston Yeo 杨峻毅	Cai Weixiong 蔡伟雄	Ah Xiong (阿雄): Cai Zhongxing's son; Suffered from mentally disabled patient
David Leong 梁家豪	Max Ang	Villain; Bum-Pincher (捏你屁股): Wu Dazhi's business partner; Lin Shuqi's ex-manager
Gabriel Yeo 杨毓恺	Alex	Li Ziyang and Liang Wenqing's university friend; Liang Wenqing's boyfriend
Zhou Quanxi 周全喜		Mr Ang (洪总裁): Max Ang's father
Huang Wenguang 黄文光	Zheng Guangzong 郑光宗	Villain Fake Private Investigator (假私家侦探): Cheated Zhang Ruoyun's money to find for her lost son; (Arrested in Episode 42)
Chua Cheng Pou 蔡清炮	Ah Mao 阿猫	Licensed debt collector; Chen Feng's ex-runner
Yap Hei Long 叶黑龙	Ah Gou 阿狗	Licensed debt collector; Chen Feng's ex-runner
Zheng Wanling 郑婉龄	Liang Jingjing 梁晶晶	Villain Sister Jingjing (晶晶姐): World Celebrity; Xu Tao's idol and sugar mummy; Dennis' boss; Slept with Xu Tao and gave him the leading role for a movie; (Arrested - in Episode 97)
Zack Lim 林志强	Dennis	Liang Jingjing's assistant
Brendon Kuah 柯油宏	Tosh	Max Ang's friend
Xavier Ong	Nat	Television Station's celebrity/ actor; Xu Tao's colleague
Tan Tiow Im 陈天祥	No Role	An old man who was bullied by Wu Dazhi and Wang Xueling in a hawker centre
Edmund Chen	Ye Chengda 叶成达	Ye Xin's father; In love with Wu Xiaoqiao; Wu Xiaoqiao's primary school classmate; Met Wu Xiaoqiao at a Cruise Ship in Episode 91
Chen Yixin 陈一心	Ye Xin 叶欣	Actress & Celebrity; Ye Chengda's daughter
Sherraine Law 罗翊琦	Host 主持人	Host of Conservation Roadshow

Cast	Role	Description
Tong Bing Yu	Zhou Ke'en 周可恩	Mentally Unstable Villain; Mightiest Mistress (最强小三), Kerin Zhou: Qi Hongzhe's ex-girlfriend; In love with Wu Dazhi; Met Wu Dazhi at a coffee shop and humiliated Lin Shuqi at a park in Episode 116; Suffered from mentally disabled patient
Thomas Ong	Qi Hongzhe 齐宏哲	Zhou Ke'en's ex-boyfriend

== Awards and nominations ==
Year	Organisation	Nominees	Category	Result	Ref
2018	Star Awards	Life Less Ordinary ensemble	Best Theme Song 最佳主题曲 (《小人物向前冲》)	Nominated	
2018	Star Awards	Romeo Tan	Best Actor	Nominated	

== Original Sound Track (OST) ==
No.	Song title	Performer(s)
1)	小人物向前冲 (Opening Theme Song)	Xiang Yun; Chen Liping; Aileen Tan; Romeo Tan; Jeffrey Xu; Felicia Chin; Ian Fang; Jayley Woo; Bonnie Loo
2)	是不是	Li Feihui
3)	等爱 Waiting For Love	Romeo Tan; Felicia Chin
4)	小人物的心声	Wu Jiaming 吴佳明
