= List of Good Luck episodes =

MediaCorp Channel 8's television series Good Luck is a Lunar New Year drama serial produced by MediaCorp Singapore in 2014. The series is about an estranged family and how they reconcile their conflicts and differences to reunite in time to welcome a new year and celebrate longevity, happiness and wealth.

As of 4 March 2015, all 20 episodes of Good Luck have been aired on MediaCorp Channel 8.

== Episodic guide ==
No.	Title	Original release date
1	"Episode 1"	February 2, 2015 PG
2	"Episode 2"	February 3, 2015 PG
3	"Episode 3"	February 4, 2015 PG
4	"Episode 4"	February 5, 2015 PG
5	"Episode 5"	February 6, 2015 PG
6	"Episode 6"	February 9, 2015 PG
7	"Episode 7"	February 10, 2015 PG
8	"Episode 8"	February 11, 2015 PG
9	"Episode 9"	February 12, 2015 PG
10	"Episode 10"	February 13, 2015 PG
11	"Episode 11"	February 16, 2015 PG
12	"Episode 12"	February 17, 2015 PG
13	"Episode 13"	February 23, 2015 PG
14	"Episode 14"	February 24, 2015 PG
15	"Episode 15"	February 25, 2015 PG
16	"Episode 16"	February 26, 2015 PG
17	"Episode 17"	February 27, 2015 PG
18	"Episode 18"	March 2, 2015 PG
19	"Episode 19"	March 3, 2015 PG
20	"Episode 20"	March 4, 2015 PG

== See also ==
- List of programmes broadcast by Mediacorp Channel 8
- Good Luck
