= Timothee Yap Jin Wei =

Singaporean sprinter

Timothee Yap
Personal information
- Full name: Timothee Yap Jin Wei
- Born: 5 November 1994 (age 32) Singapore
- Occupations: Lawyer, Olympic Athlete, Actor
- Agent: NoonTalk Media
- Height: 1.84 m (6 ft 0 in)
- Weight: 72 kg (159 lb)

Timothee Yap Jin Wei (叶劲维; born 5 November 1994) is a Singaporean sprinter. He has represented Singapore at several major international competitions across the various age categories and at the senior level. He competed at the 2016 Summer Olympics in the men's 100 metres race; his time of 10.79 seconds in the second round did not qualify him for the semifinals.

== Athletics ==
Yap took part in the Summer Olympics at the Rio 2016 where he participated in the 100m sprint. In the preliminaries, he clocked a time of 10.84s and finished second in Heat 3. He then qualified for the next round in Heat 7 where he raced with Usain Bolt. He was ranked 9th with a time of 10.79s, which was faster than the preliminaries.

== Showbiz career ==
In September 2016, NoonTalk Media and Yap completed a contract.

Yap debuted in the Mediacorp Toggle's web series 2589 Days Apart, together with Felicia Chin as the female lead.

== Personal life ==
Yap is a graduate of the National University of Singapore with a Bachelor of Laws (Honours) (LL.B.) and is currently practicing law in Singapore as an advocate and solicitor of the Supreme Court of Singapore at Allen and Gledhill LLP, specialising mainly in domestic and cross border mergers and acquisitions, restructuring and general corporate work.

== Filmography ==
Year	Title	Role	Notes	Refs
2017	2589 Days Apart	Zheng De Lu 郑德禄 (First Male Lead)		
2018	VIC	Himself		
2018	Emerald Hill High	Joseph (First Male Lead)		
