= Precious Is the Night =

- Film poster
- Traditional Chinese: 今宵多珍重
- Simplified Chinese: 今宵多珍重
- Literal meaning: cherish this night
- Hanyu Pinyin: jīnxiāo duō zhēnzhòng
- Directed by: Wayne Peng
- Written by: Wayne Peng
- Produced by: Chen Chi-yuan; Wayne Peng
- Starring: Chuando Tan; Nanyeli; Chang Tsu-lei; Lydia Lau King-man; Chen Yixin; Xiang Yun; Tay Ping Hui
- Cinematography: Wayne Peng
- Edited by: Lawrence Ang
- Music by: Evan Roberts
- Production companies: Pure Films; Infinite Frameworks Pte. Ltd.
- Distributed by: mm2 Entertainment; Disney+
- Release dates: 5 November 2020 (57th Golden Horse Awards); 29 April 2021 (Singapore)
- Running time: 80 minutes
- Countries: Taiwan; Singapore
- Language: Mandarin

Precious Is the Night (Chinese: 今宵多珍重) is a 2020 Taiwanese-Singaporean mystery thriller drama film written and directed by Wayne Peng, and starring Chuando Tan, Nayeli, Chang Tsu-lei, Lydia Lau King-man, Chen Yixin, Xiang Yun and Tay Ping Hui. The film had its world premiere at the 57th Golden Horse Awards on November 5, 2020. It was officially released in Singapore on April 29, 2021. It received 2 nominations at the 57th Golden Horse Awards, including Best Cinematography for Wayne and Best Makeup & Costume Design for Lim Sau-hoong. It was selected as the Singaporean entry for the Best International Feature Film at the 94th Academy Awards. It is also available for streaming on Disney+ through Hotstar in selected regions.

== Synopsis ==
In 1960s Singapore, the story follows a 30-year-old doctor (Chuando Tan) who is caught up in a web of deception, sex and lies. The murder drama revolves around a doctor making a phone call to a mysterious and wealthy family.

== Cast ==
- Chuando Tan
- Nayeli Nan Miao
- Chang Tsu-lei
- Lydia Lau King-man
- Chen Yixin
- Xiang Yun
- Tay Ping Hui

Source :

== Reception ==
John Lui of The Straits Times rated the film two stars out of five, writing "Visually, this movie is stunning, but one wishes this unruly mix of lust, literary allusions and lurid crime tale had a story to match." Richard Kuipers of Variety gave the film a negative review.

== Awards and nominations ==
Award	Category	Recipients	Result	Notes
57th Golden Horse Awards	Best Cinematography	Wayne Peng	Nominated	
57th Golden Horse Awards	Best Makeup & Costume Design	Lim Sau-hoong	Nominated	

== See also ==
- List of submissions to the 94th Academy Awards for Best International Feature Film
- List of Singaporean submissions for the Academy Award for Best International Feature Film
