= Wonder Boy (2017 film) =

2017 Singaporean film

- Theatrical release poster
- Directed by: Dick Lee; Daniel Yam
- Written by: Dick Lee; Ong Kuo Sin
- Produced by: Melvin Ang; Bert Tan; Boi Kwong; Teri Tan; Ricky Ow; Chang Long Jong; Ng Say Yong
- Starring: Benjamin Kheng; Julie Tan; Zachary Ibrahim; Chen Xi; Fang Rong; Michelle Wong; Ryan Ang
- Cinematography: Yong Choon Lin
- Edited by: Neo Rui Xin
- Music by: Dick Lee
- Production companies: mm2 Entertainment; Bert Pictures; Dick Lee Asia
- Distributed by: Golden Village Pictures
- Release date: August 3, 2017
- Running time: 96 minutes
- Country: Singapore
- Languages: English; Mandarin; Cantonese
- Budget: S$1.3 million

Wonder Boy (Chinese: 音为爱; pinyin: Yīnwèi Ài) is a 2017 Singaporean coming-of-age musical film directed by Dick Lee in his directorial debut, and co-directed by Daniel Yam. An autobiographical film, it stars Benjamin Kheng as a younger version of Lee.

== Plot ==
16-year-old Richard grew up during a time when rock music was banned and long-haired men were considered gangsters. During his rebellious teenage years, Richard joins a singing group in school named The Wonder Boys, and embarks on his coming-of-age journey through youthful ambition, friendships and first love, all the while trying to have his music heard.

== Cast ==
- Benjamin Kheng as Richard "Dick" Lee
- Julie Tan as Linda, Richard's love interest
- Constance Song as Elizabeth Lee, Richard's mother
- Gerald Chew as Richard's father, Mr Kip
- Zachary Ibrahim as Mark, Richard's bandmate and best friend
- Chen Xi as Sammy, Richard's friend and bandmate
- Fang Rong as Louise, Richard's ex-crushee
- Michelle Wong as Patricia "Pat" Lee, Richard's younger sister
- Ryan Ang as Roy, Richard's friend and bandmate
- Jensern Lim as Andrew Lee, Richard's youngest brother
- Amy Cheng as Richard's teacher
- Alexis Bauduin
- Gerry Rezel
- Richard Herrera
- Shane Mardjuki

== Production ==
=== Pre-production ===
Lee, who decided to venture into film-making, wanted to make a film inspired by his experiences as a budding singer-songwriter and student at St. Joseph's Institution from 1972 to 1974. According to an interview during the press conference for Wonder Boy, Lee said that "not much is known about my teenage days because a lot of people only know me from (album) The Mad Chinaman onwards, which was in the late 80s", and that the film "will be a revelation to a lot of people, even to my oldest audience". Meanwhile, the film would depict the era correctly and truthfully, including taking drugs, although some of the content would be fictionalized because "there are several characters that are being made into composite characters and we don’t want living people to come accuse me of this and that". Wonder Boy was initially envisioned to be a play, but during development, it evolved into a film.

=== Casting and crew ===
Benjamin Kheng, who is best known for being a member of the group The Sam Willows, was picked for the lead role. He still had to audition for the role as Lee wanted to be sure he was the perfect choice. Kheng had previously played Lee in TheatreWorks' 2012 musical National Broadway Company.

Most of the cast were announced during the press conference, although the role of Richard's father, which would be taken up by Gerald Chew, was not yet cast.

Daniel Yam was brought in as co-director to help Lee in the technical side of filming.

=== Filming ===
Filming started in October 2016, and took place in Singapore and Penang, Malaysia. During the press conference held on August 1, 2017, Lee admitted that he had a difficult time filming as he was painfully reminded of his rebellious teenage past.

== Soundtrack ==
Song Featured In The Motion Picture Wonder Boy (Songs Inspired by the Motion Picture)

Soundtrack album by Dick Lee
- Released: August 1, 2017
- Genre: Soundtrack
- Length: 24:01
- Label: AOR Studios

The songs featured in Wonder Boy are mostly covers of Lee's songs from his debut album Life Story, including "Life Story" and "Fried Rice Paradise". The music video for "Fried Rice Paradise", sung by the film's main cast, was uploaded onto YouTube on June 15, 2017. On August 1, 2017, Lee released an EP entitled Song Featured In The Motion Picture Wonder Boy (Songs Inspired by the Motion Picture), which consists of re-recordings of his songs featured in the film.

== Reception ==
John Lui of The Straits Times gave Wonder Boy a 2.5 out of 5 stars, feeling that it "delivers a frank look at the swinging seventies", telling the story of "a musician trying to be heard in a world that does not care for tunes they have not heard on the radio - when Lee (Kheng) performs, audiences literally walk out". However, it "suffers from structural issues" as "the collapsing of several real people into a single character has also led to schizophrenia; bullies turn into best friends overnight, before they flip again".
