= Good Luck (TV series) =

- 百岁大吉
- Genre: Lunar New Year; Family
- Written by: Goh Chwee Chwee 吴翠翠; Soh Bee Lian 苏美莲; Kao Lie Boon 许丽雯; Lim Gim Lan 林锦兰
- Starring: Hong Huifang; Chen Shucheng; Chen Liping; Rayson Tan; Romeo Tan; Chris Tong; Kym Ng; Terence Cao; Zhang Zhenhuan; Paige Chua; Aloysius Pang
- Opening theme: 心与心 by Stella Seah Hui Xian and Jacky Chew
- Ending theme: 恋曲1990 by Terence Cao
- Country of origin: Singapore
- Original language: Chinese
- No. of episodes: 20 (list of episodes)

Production
- Executive producer: Soh Bee Lian 苏美莲
- Running time: approx. 45 minutes (exc. advertisements)

Original release
- Network: MediaCorp Channel 8
- Release: 2 February – 4 March 2015

Related
- You Can Be an Angel Too; Life Is Beautiful

Good Luck (Chinese: 百岁大吉) is a Lunar New Year drama serial produced by MediaCorp Studios and aired on Channel 8. Hong Huifang portrays a centenarian who is a matriarch of a 4-generation family in the series; other characters include Chen Shucheng, Chen Liping, Rayson Tan, Romeo Tan, Chris Tong, Kym Ng, Terence Cao, Zhang Zhenhuan, Paige Chua and Aloysius Pang. The series began production in September 2014 and wrapped up its filming in November 2014. It began on 2 February 2015 with a total of 20 episodes.

== Plot ==
Lin-He Xiangniang (Hong Huifang), matriarch of a 4-generation family, celebrates her 100th birthday on the first day of Chinese New Year. Widowed in her middle age, she slogged away and singlehandedly raised four sons and two daughters. A life of hardship has made her increasingly stern towards those around her. She is especially harsh on her children. In the eyes of others, Xiangniang is an old lady who is getting cranky by the day. They keep a polite distance from her. With her second son, Lin Xiaoyi (Zhang Wei), and her biological daughter, Lin Xiaolian (Lin Ruping), migrated overseas, she is left with her third son, Lin Xiaohe, youngest son, Lin Xiaoping, and her adopted daughter, Lin Xiaozhen. Although they are family, everyone fights over money matters every day. For peace of mind, Xiangniang splits the family assets among her children to let them venture on their own, and even makes them leave the family home.

Lin Shijie (Terence Cao) is the orphaned child of Xiangniang's eldest son. His parents were killed in an accident when he was still a baby. Shijie was brought up by Xiangniang. He is her favorite grandchild among her brood of grandchildren. Shijie's unbridled ways, non-competitive nature and carefree spirit captivates Suxian at first sight. Shijie and Suxian get married. Shijie's character remains unchanged after marriage and they have a son, Jiayuan. Suxian feels that Shijie lacks a sense of responsibility and is wasting his life away. She reaches breaking point and part ways with Shijie. To avoid hampering Suxian from remarrying, Shijie makes up his mind to migrate overseas with Jiayuan.

After regaining her singlehood, Suxian (Kym Ng) puts her heart and soul into her career. Suxian is attentive to details and is thoughtful to others. She has no qualms about putting up a front as long as this does not burden anyone. Although she has divorced Shijie, Suxian remains close with Xiangniang. She is the one who understands Xiangniang's feelings most. Xiangniang lives in hope that Suxian will reconcile with Shijie.

Jiayuan (Aloysius Pang), who grows up abroad receiving a liberal education, is sly and capricious. He enjoys observing people and is good at reading their moods. After years of being away, Jiayuan returns to the family home. He sees in his great grandmother, Xiangniang, a centenarian surrounded by a bunch of money grubbers lusting after her remaining fortune. As Jiayuan laments at this observation, he is suddenly seized by a sense of righteousness. When Xiangniang regains consciousness from an accident, Jiayuan joins hands with Xiangniang to save the family.

Lin Xiaohe (Chen Shucheng), Xiangniang's third son, is the boss of a traditional hair salon. Xiaohe is amiable toward outsiders but is domineering when it comes to family members, particularly towards his wife, Zhong Yunxiu who is submissive to him. The couple has an only daughter, Lin Shihui.

Shihui (Chris Tong) has always been an independent, and a sensible girl who does not give trouble to her parents. An outstanding student both in conduct and studies, she joins the working world as an independent-thinking, modern woman. Opinionated and capable, she is savvy in seizing opportunities. She is employed in an auditor's firm. Her excellent performance earns the boss’ trust. Shihui resents her father's overbearing ways, which strains the relationship between father and daughter. Yunxiu constantly pesters Shihui to tie the knot, fearing that she will pass a marriageable age. This forces Shihui more than ever to evade the question. But all that changes when she meets Liu Xuan (Romeo Tan).

Liu Xuan is good looking and charming, with an air of maturity. He can strike up a conversation with anyone and projects a mature demeanor. However, he is a boy at heart, and occasionally behaves in a way that raises eyebrows. Despite holding a Masters in Philosophy, he does not pursue fame and fortune. Full of passionate ideals, he gives up a well-paying job as a lecturer in an academy to teach in a Special Education school, helping children with learning disabilities.

Liu Xuan meets Shihui and he finds out that she is a former volunteer at an orphanage. Deciding that she is the only girl he will ever marry, Liu Xuan woos her aggressively. In no time, Shihui and the younger Liu Xuan get together. Xiaohe vehemently opposes the relationship. The rebellious Shihui throws caution to the wind and enters into a “lightning” marriage with Liu Xuan. In marriage, both begin to notice each other's differences. Shihui is subsequently awakened to the fact that the marriage is unstable and holding on to it tightly will only hurt both parties. In the end, she decides to part with Liu Xuan. But after the separation, Shihui realises she is pregnant with Liu Xuan's child and both of them discover that they are unable to forget each other.

Lin Xiaoping (Li Wenhai) is Xiangniang's youngest son. With his mother's help, he had opened a tailor's shop. Despite this being a sunset industry, Xiaoping continues to keep the old shop alive. He pampers his only son, Lin Shijun (Zhang Zhenhuan), who is a typical youth of the “strawberry generation” in the post ‘80s. Shijun has lofty ideals but limited means. He wants to earn big bucks but lacks the ability. He aims high and acts smart. His investments often end in losses. Whenever Shijun needs money, he will turn to his relatives. This causes Xiaoping and Xiaohe to be at loggerheads with each other.

Lin Xiaozhen (Chen Liping), Xiangniang's adopted daughter, has always felt that Xiangniang treats her like an outsider. In her younger days, she was unfortunate to have married a gambling addict, and picked up the vice herself. Her husband's gambling debts led him to abandon his family and daughter. The headstrong Xiaozhen refused Xiangniang's offer of assistance, and went ahead to deliver a baby girl, Fang Enqi (Paige Chua). Xiaozhen is unable to overcome her gambling addiction and the business at her restaurant worsens. Enqi is determined to take over it. As business improves, Enqi and the chef fall for each other, whereupon a child is conceived. When the chef admits later that he cannot marry Enqi, Xiaozhen forces Enqi to have an abortion. Enqi, whose character and fate mirror Xiaozhen's, chooses to give birth to her daughter, Jiang Bao’er (Jaylynn Loh). Now a single mother, Enqi gets along well with her cousin, Lin Shijun. Shijun dotes on Bao’er and starts to court Enqi. Enqi finds out later that Shijun, who dreams of being rich, is actually eyeing her restaurant. When the two break up, Shijun realizes that he is truly in love with Enqi. For the sake of love, Shijun makes up his mind to shed his pampered lifestyle and make an honest living.

The Lin family goes through a series of ups and downs over the years. On Xiangniang's 100th birthday, all the children come home one after another. The whole group of people before Xiangniang's eyes is diverse like a mini United Nations. Nevertheless, there is harmony and laughter in the air. Every family brings back a patchwork blanket which Xiangniang has sewn in the past, and all the pieces are joined together as an expression of a united family.

== Cast ==
=== Main cast ===
Cast	Character	Description	Episodes Appeared
Hong Huifang 洪慧芳	Lin-He Xiangniang 林何香娘	Ang Ku Kueh (红龟糕); Lin Xiaoyi, Lin Xiaolian, Lin Xiaohe, Lin Xiaoping's mother Lin Xiaozhen's adoptive mother Lin Shijie, Lin Shijun, Lin Shihui and Fang Enqi's grandmother Li Suxian's ex-grandmother in-law Lin Jiayuan and Jiang Bao'er's great-grandmother	1-20
Chen Shucheng 陈澍城	Lin Xiaohe 林孝和	Lin-He Xiangniang's third son Lin Shihui's father Owner of a haircut shop Barber; Younger version played by Ho Wen Long	1-20
Chen Liping 陈莉萍	Lin Xiaozhen 林孝真	Lin-He Xiangniang's younger and adopted daughter Fang Enqi's mother Fang Youda's ex-wife Jiang Bao'er's grandmother Owner of a restaurant Gambler; Younger version played by Shelia Tan	1-20
Rayson Tan 陈泰铭	Fang Youda 方友达	Lin Xiaozhen's husband Fang Enqi's father Jiang Bao'er's grandfather Loan shark-turned-delivery man	5-20
Romeo Tan 陈罗密欧	Liu Xuan 刘轩	Lin Shihui's husband Younger version played by Jerald Tan	1-20
Chris Tong 童冰玉	Lin Shihui 林世慧	Liu Xuan's wife Lin Xiaohe's daughter Lin-He Xiangniang's granddaughter	1-20
Kym Ng 鐘琴	Li Suxian 李素娴	Lin Shijie's ex-wife Lin Jiayuan's mother Younger version played by Tan Mei Kee	1-20
Terence Cao 曹国辉	Lin Shijie 林世杰	Nelson; Li Suxian's ex-husband Lin Jiayuan's father Lin-He Xiangniang's grandson Son of Lin-He Xiangniang's deceased eldest son Younger version played by Zong Zijie	3-20
Zhang Zhenhuan 张振寰	Lin Shijun 林世君	Lin Xiaoping's son Lin-He Xiangniang's grandson Likes Fang Enqi	1-20
Paige Chua 蔡琦慧	Fang Enqi 方恩琦	Fang Youda and Lin Xiaozhen's daughter Jiang Bao'er's mother Boss of En Ji	1-3, 5-11, 13-20
Aloysius Pang 冯伟衷	Lin Jiayuan 林家元	Yan; Li Suxian and Lin Shijie's son Lin-He Xiangniang's great-grandson	1-20

=== Supporting cast ===
Cast	Character	Description	Episodes Appeared
Chen Juanjuan 陈娟娟	Zhong Yunxiu 钟云秀	Lin Xiaohe's wife Lin Shihui's mother	
Li Wenhai 李文海	Lin Xiaoping 林孝平	Lin-He Xiangniang's youngest son Lin Shijun's father	
Jaylynn Loh 卢乐慈	Jiang Bao'er 江宝儿	Fang Enqi's daughter	
Louis Wu 伍洛毅	Roy	Lin Shihui's boss	
Joey Feng 冯瑾瑜	Miley	Lin Shihui's co-worker who was fired	
Amy Cheng 郑花如	Flora	Lin Shihui's co-worker	
Candyce Toh 杜蕙甹	Chen Peiwen 陈佩文	Lin Shijie's old pal A single mother	9-16
Nathaniel 校其平	Ocean	Chen Peiwen's son Lin Shijie's birth son	9-16
Teo Ser Lee 张思丽	Lin Xiaoping's wife 林孝平妻	Lin Shijun's mother	
Chua Cheng Pou 蔡清炮	Ah Pao 阿炮	Chef at En Ji	
Ryan Lian 廖永谊	Terry		
Zhu Xiufeng 朱秀凤	Fen-jie 芬姐	Lin-He Xiangniang's maid	
Huang Shinan 黄世南	Henry		
Ian Teng 丁翊	Hugo		
Ivan Lo 卢楷浚	Sebas		
Ho Tien Tsai 何添财	Da Fa 大发		
Zhang Wei 张为	Lin Xiaoyi 林孝义	Lin-He Xiangniang's second son	18-20
Anna Lim 林茹萍	Lin Xiaolian 林孝廉	Lin-He Xiangniang's eldest daughter	18-20

== Trivia ==
- In order to play a 100-year-old matriarch, Hong Huifang had to undergo 'instant ageing'. It takes two hours to put the makeup on, and one hour to remove.
- This will be the second time Chen Liping and Rayson Tan would be playing an on-screen couple after Golden Shenton Way, and the first time in 20 years.

== Accolades ==
Organisation	Year	Category	Recipients (if any)	Result	Ref
Star Awards	2016	Best Evergreen Artiste Award	Hong Huifang	Nominated	
Star Awards	2016	Best Supporting Actress	Paige Chua	Nominated	
Star Awards	2016	London Choco Roll Happiness Award	Aloysius Pang	Nominated	
Star Awards	2016	Bioskin Flawless Skin Award 完美肌肤奖	Paige Chua	Nominated	

== See also ==
- List of MediaCorp Channel 8 Chinese drama series (2010s)
- List of Good Luck episodes
