= Russell Lee (writer) =

Singaporean author

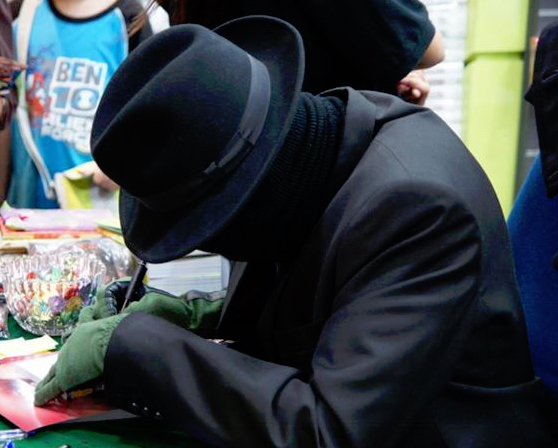
- Russell Lee at a book signing.
- Writing career
- Pen name: Russell Lee
- Period: 1989–present
- Genres: Horror, Drama, Comedy, Non-Fiction
- Notable work: True Singapore Ghost Stories
- Website: flameoftheforest.com

Russell Lee is a Singaporean author best known as the creator of True Singapore Ghost Stories, a book series that has been one of the most popular sources of ghost stories in Singapore, Malaysia, other parts of Asia ever since the release of Book 1 in 1989.

Lee has had a lasting impact on Singapore publishing. The first release was the first of many that were published for the mass market. Before Russell Lee, a book which achieved sales of 3,000 copies was considered a bestseller. True Singapore Ghost Stories surpassed 30,000 copies in three months.

Shortly after the success of Lee's first book, readers began to wonder about his identity. Lee has never provided any photograph of himself or revealed any information about his personal life. Whenever he appears in public, he wears a mask and clothes that cover every inch of his body. Some reports say that Russell Lee is white, posing as a local Singaporean. Others say he is Jim Aitchison (aka James Lee), but this has never been substantiated. In the books, Lee swears he is Singaporean, with the "five stars and crescent moon imprinted on each blood cell". He has explicitly stated that the name 'Russell Lee' is not a pseudonym for a group of writers.

== True Singapore Ghost Stories ==
As of 2026, 29 books in the True Singapore Ghost Stories series have been released, with over 1.5 million copies sold worldwide.

In 2014, True Singapore Ghost Stories 25th Year Special Edition was released, where it looked back at the first 25 years of the series. A 2nd Special Edition celebrating the series' 35th year anniversary was released in 2024.

Book 27, the latest in the series, was released in 2023. The author has expressed his hope to reach Book 50.

The book series has also been made into a 13-part TV series. The series was produced by I-Media Entertainment in Singapore.

== Works ==
The Complete List				
S/N	Book	Year Published	Publisher	ISBN
1	The Almost Complete Collection of True Singapore Ghost Stories	1989	Flame Of The Forest Publishing	ISBN 9810012829
2	The Almost Complete Collection of True Singapore Ghost Stories Book 1	1989	Flame Of The Forest Publishing	ISBN 9789810013462
3	The Almost Complete Collection of True Singapore Ghost Stories Book 2	1992	Flame Of The Forest Publishing	ISBN 9789810025298
4	The Almost Complete Collection of True Singapore Ghost Stories Book 3	1994	Angsana Books	ISBN 9789810052249
5	The Almost Complete Collection of True Singapore Ghost Stories Book 4	1994	Angsana Books	ISBN 9789813056480
6	The Almost Complete Collection of True Singapore Ghost Stories Book 5	1995	Angsana Books	ISBN 9789813056961
7	The Almost Complete Collection of True Singapore Ghost Stories Book 6	1995	Angsana Books	ISBN 9789813056374
8	The Almost Complete Collection of True Singapore Ghost Stories Book 7	1995	Angsana Books	ISBN 9789813056060
9	The Almost Complete Collection of True Singapore Ghost Stories Book 8	1996	Angsana Books	ISBN 9789813056077
10	The Almost Complete Collection of True Singapore Ghost Stories Book 9	1997	Angsana Books	ISBN 9789813056152
11	The Almost Complete Collection of True Singapore Ghost Stories Book 10	1999	Angsana Books	ISBN 9789813056183
12	The Almost Complete Collection of True Singapore Ghost Stories Book 11	2003	Angsana Books	ISBN 9789813056572
13	The Almost Complete Collection of True Singapore Ghost Stories Book 12	2004	Angsana Books	ISBN 9789813056800
14	The Almost Complete Collection of True Singapore Ghost Stories Book 13	2005	Angsana Books	ISBN 9789813056985
15	The Almost Complete Collection of True Singapore Ghost Stories Book 14	2006	Angsana Books	ISBN 9789814193078
16	The Almost Complete Collection of True Singapore Ghost Stories Book 15	2006	Angsana Books	ISBN 9789814193191
17	The Almost Complete Collection of True Singapore Ghost Stories Book 16	2007	Angsana Books	ISBN 9789814193320
18	The Almost Complete Collection of True Singapore Ghost Stories Book 17	2007	Angsana Books	ISBN 9789814193450
19	The Almost Complete Collection of True Singapore Ghost Stories Book 18	2008	Angsana Books	ISBN 9789814193542
20	The Almost Complete Collection of True Singapore Ghost Stories Book 19	2009	Angsana Books	ISBN 9789814193771
21	The Almost Complete Collection of True Singapore Ghost Stories Book 20	2010	Angsana Books	ISBN 9789814193931
22	The Almost Complete Collection of True Singapore Ghost Stories Book 21	2011	Angsana Books	ISBN 9789814315135
23	The Almost Complete Collection of True Singapore Ghost Stories Book 22	2012	Angsana Books	ISBN 9789814315241
24	The Almost Complete Collection of True Singapore Ghost Stories Book 23	2013	Angsana Books	ISBN 9789814315418
25	The Almost Complete Collection of True Singapore Ghost Stories 25th Year Special Edition	2014	Angsana Books	ISBN 9789814315548
26	The Almost Complete Collection of True Singapore Ghost Stories Book 24	2015	Angsana Books	ISBN 9789814315647
27	The Almost Complete Collection of True Singapore Ghost Stories Book 25	2017	Angsana Books	ISBN 9789814315814
28	The Almost Complete Collection of True Singapore Ghost Stories Book 26	2020	Angsana Books	ISBN 9789814388085
29	The Almost Complete Collection of True Singapore Ghost Stories Book 27	2023	Angsana Books	ISBN 9789814388160
30	The Almost Complete Collection of True Singapore Ghost Stories 35th Year Special Edition	2024	Angsana Books	ISBN 9789814388191

== See also ==
- True Singapore Ghost Stories
- James Lee
