= Chen Yixin (actress) =

Singaporean actress

- Born: 26 April 2000 (age 26); Singapore
- Other name: Yixin
- Education: Singapore Polytechnic
- Occupations: Actress; singer
- Years active: 2011–present
- Agent: Artiste Co
- Parents: Xiang Yun; Edmund Chen
- Relatives: Chen Xi (brother)

Chinese name
- Traditional Chinese: 陳一心
- Simplified Chinese: 陈一心
- Hanyu Pinyin: Chén Yīxīn

Chen Yixin (born 26 April 2000) is a Singaporean actress.

== Early life and career ==
Chen Yixin was born on 26 April 2000, the daughter of actors Edmund Chen and Xiang Yun. She has an older brother, Chen Xi, who is also an actor.

Chen began appearing in commercials at age 6 and discovered her love for performing when she picked up dancing in secondary school. She attended Singapore Polytechnic, majoring in applied drama and psychology, and graduated in 2020.

She played a cameo role in Echoing Love (2011), an anthology film co-directed by her father Edmund Chen. She has also appeared in the Mediacorp dramas Life Less Ordinary (2017) and While We Are Young (2017). Chen is also a regular face in fashion magazines and she has appeared in ad campaigns for brands which include hello, Goldheart and Orasyl. She has also been roped in to promote beauty brands such as Dior Beauty and Kiehl's on social media.

Chen has also ventured into singing, and frequently does song covers on her social media sites.

She landed her first lead role in Teenage Textbook: The Series (2021), acting alongside Xuan Ong, Chris Mak, and Gavin Teo.

She was also cast in Mr. Midnight: Beware the Monsters (2022), a 13-episode Netflix series, which was adapted from the Singaporean horror-mystery children's book series of the same name.

In 2023, Chen appeared in the second season of drama series Titoudao, playing a feisty and rebellious performer opposite Chen Liping and Koe Yeet.

== Personal life ==
Chen has been in a relationship with singer-actor Gavin Teo, her Rhythm of Youth and Teenage Textbook: The Series co-star, since 2019. In February 2024, Chen announced her breakup with Teo.

In an interview in September 2023, Chen revealed that she struggles with attention deficit hyperactivity disorder (ADHD) since childhood, but only came to know her condition in 2021 when she was studying psychology.

== Filmography ==
=== Television series ===
Year	Title	Role	Notes	Ref.
2017	While We Are Young	Hong Yuanyuan		
2017	Life Less Ordinary	Ye Xin	Cameo	
2018	Love At Cavenagh Bridge			
2021	Teenage Textbook: The Series	Sissy Song		
2022	Mr. Midnight: Beware the Monsters	Ling		
2023	Titoudao: Dawn of a New Stage			
2023	All That Glitters	Mo Xuemin		

=== Film ===
Year	Title	Role	Notes	Ref.
2011	Echoing Love	Grandchild	Cameo	
2019	DBS Sparks		Short film	
2019	Fresh Takes! - Rhythm of Youth		Short film	
2020	Precious Is the Night	Tan Yixin		
2022	For Always		Short film	

== Discography ==
=== Singles ===
Year	Song title	Notes
2017	"Love"	While We Are Young soundtrack; co-performer
2018	"Well Wishes"	Lunar New Year Album 2018; co-performer
