= 2589 Days Apart =

- 2589的距离
- Genre: School; Romance
- Written by: Rebecca Leow
- Directed by: Chen Yi You
- Starring: Felicia Chin; Timothee Yap
- Opening theme: 浪费 by Yoga Lin
- Country of origin: Singapore
- Original language: Mandarin
- No. of episodes: 5

Production
- Producer: Leong Lye Lin
- Production location: Singapore
- Running time: approx. 16 minutes

Original release
- Network: Toggle
- Release: 15 May – 22 May 2017

2589 Days Apart is a toggle original series. It stars Felicia Chin and Timothee Yap as the main cast of the series.

== Cast ==
- Felicia Chin as Wu Weiwei
- Timothee Yap as Tay Teck Loo
- Zong Zijie as Elvis Chong
- Haden Hee as Derrick
- Joyce Ng as Michelle

== Episodes ==
Episode 1 - While counselling Michelle who suffers from an inferiority complex, Wu first meets Zheng, a sprinter who is a failing student and all round trouble maker. When Wu tries to break up a fight between him and other boys, Zheng hurts Wu’s hand by accident. During an inquiry into the matter, Wu is invited to the principal’s office where she witnesses a difference in opinion about Zheng amongst the teachers. One camp believes a recalcitrant like Zheng should be expelled while the others believe Zheng’s track achievements should be reason enough to keep him. Wu decides to defend Zheng by bringing to light that Zheng was provoked into the fight by the other boys. As a result, the principal decides to give Zheng one last chance. But the catch is, he only has one semester to prove his worth.

Episode 2 - Under Wu’s guidance, Zheng has made remarkable progress. This is most evident in his improved academic scores and as a result, the bond between them strengthens. Buoyed by his improvement, Zheng invites Wu and Michelle to watch him race. But after a jealous team mate tempers with his starting block, Zheng misses his start and fails to clinch the gold medal. This provokes Zheng into a rage but the angry teen remembers Wu’s advice and manages to keep his cool. Wu witnesses this change and is heartened.

Episode 3 - As time goes by, Zheng and Wu grow closer. But Wu understands that there is a fundamental divide that can’t be bridged and thus, cuts off contact with Zheng. Zheng is devastated and drops out of school. Frantic, Zheng’s mother seeks Wu’s help to convince her son to return to school. Angry at Zheng’s childishness, Wu confronts the teen and in the end manages to inspire him to return to school and study hard. Zheng also makes a pact with Wu making her promise to meet him by the track in 2589 days, because that’s the number of days between their two ages. He wants to see if he can bridge their gap in 2589 days.

Episode 4 - 2589 days later, 7 years have passed. Zheng remembered his pact and anxious to meet Wu, he camps overnight by the track. However, Wu does not show up the next day and he leaves disappointed. Unknown to him, Wu’s mother had passed on the same day and thus had been busy making funeral arrangements. By the time Wu remembered the pact with Zheng and hurries over to meet him, Zheng had already left. 5 more years passed and now Wu is 38 years old. No longer is she is the wide-eyed counselor who thought she could change the world, one life at a time. Jaded, she quits her job. Zheng too has given up on waiting and now pours all his energies into building his career. Time passes until one fine day...

Episode 5 - At 40, Wu is a shadow of her former self. Unemployed, unmotivated and unsuccessful, Wu fails over and over to land a job. After yet another failed interview, she bumps into an adult Zheng. Ashamed, she takes pains to avoid him. Another 2589 days pass. It’s been 14 years since Zheng first visited the track hoping to meet Wu again. Despite trying to forget her, Zheng cannot and thus returns to the track, this time with a bouquet of roses. Unknown to him, Wu is also present to fulfill the promise she made to Zheng 21 years ago. She sees him, no longer as a teenage boy, but as a handsome, successful man who is still waiting for his lost love. Afraid at first, Wu hesitates, but finally, she makes up her mind...

== Accolades ==
Organisation	Year	Category	Nominees	Result	Ref
Asian Television Awards	2017	Best Actress in a Leading Role	Felicia Chin	Nominated	

== See also ==
- List of programmes broadcast by Mediacorp Channel 8
