= True Singapore Ghost Stories =

Series of horror books by Russell Lee

- Author: Russell Lee
- Original title: The Almost Complete Collection of True Singapore Ghost Stories
- Language: English
- Genre: Horror, Drama, Comedy, Non-Fiction
- Publisher: Angsana Books, Flame Of The Forest Publishing (flameoftheforest.com)
- Publication date: 1989 (Earliest, Book 1); 2024 (Latest, 35th Year Special Edition)
- Publication place: Singapore
- Pages: Roughly 160

The Almost Complete Collection of True Singapore Ghost Stories (also True Singapore Ghost Stories or TSGS) is the bestselling book series in Singapore. With over 1.5 million copies sold, the series has become a household name since its inception in 1989. Russell Lee, a Singaporean author, compiles reports, stories and interviews about the supernatural. Light and entertaining, each book, which comprises about 30 stories, appeals to both children and mature readers.

Most of the stories take place in Asia but some take place in other parts of the world. Lee also includes articles about the paranormal, featuring detailed investigations into the occult, witchcraft, vampires and other similar topics.

So far, 29 books have been released. Each book has a specific theme and an artwork on the front cover that characterises the book.

Lee's latest book is the 35th Year Special Edition.

The books are sold in Singapore, Malaysia, and some other neighbouring countries.

== Author ==
Russell Lee is the author of the series. He has been writing about the supernatural since 1989.

== Books ==
Below are a list of books published under the series:

The Complete List
S/N	Book	Year Published
1	True Singapore Ghost Stories Book 1	1989
2	True Singapore Ghost Stories Book 2	1992
3	True Singapore Ghost Stories Book 3	1994
4	True Singapore Ghost Stories Book 4	1994
5	True Singapore Ghost Stories Book 5	1995
6	True Singapore Ghost Stories Book 6	1995
7	True Singapore Ghost Stories Book 7	1995
8	True Singapore Ghost Stories Book 8	1996
9	True Singapore Ghost Stories Book 9	1997
10	True Singapore Ghost Stories Book 10	1999
11	True Singapore Ghost Stories Book 11	2003
12	True Singapore Ghost Stories Book 12	2004
13	True Singapore Ghost Stories Book 13	2005
14	True Singapore Ghost Stories Book 14	2006
15	True Singapore Ghost Stories Book 15	2006
16	True Singapore Ghost Stories Book 16	2007
17	True Singapore Ghost Stories Book 17	2007
18	True Singapore Ghost Stories Book 18	2008
19	True Singapore Ghost Stories Book 19	2009
20	True Singapore Ghost Stories Book 20	2010
21	True Singapore Ghost Stories Book 21	2011
22	True Singapore Ghost Stories Book 22	2012
23	True Singapore Ghost Stories Book 23	2013
24	True Singapore Ghost Stories 25th Year Special Edition	2014
25	True Singapore Ghost Stories Book 24	2015
26	True Singapore Ghost Stories Book 25	2017
27	True Singapore Ghost Stories Book 26	2020
28	True Singapore Ghost Stories Book 27	2023
29	True Singapore Ghost Stories 35th Year Special Edition	2024

== Television series ==
A 13-part TV series, True Singapore Ghost Stories, has been produced by I-Media Entertainment in Singapore.

== USS Collaboration ==
In 2015, Russell Lee and Universal Studios Singapore collaborated in the production of Halloween Horror Nights at Resorts World Sentosa. Stories and characters from the book series were used in the month-long event. It was like experiencing True Singapore Ghost Stories with a Hollywood twist.

== Recognition ==
According to the Singapore Book of Records, the True Singapore Ghost Stories is the best-selling local series by a team of writers, and the all-time best-selling local book series, in Singapore.

The Straits Times mentions "Russell Lee’s True Singapore Ghost Stories has been a mainstay on Singapore bestseller lists since they hit shelves in 1989. The material is just so incredibly rich... You just want to read on". While the South China Morning Post states that "Russell Lee is Singapore’s most popular writer by a long stretch. His prose is clear and his titles snappy." The Star reports that True Singapore Ghost Stories Book 1 is Singapore’s all-time number one bestseller".
