= Mr. Midnight =

Children's horror book series by James Lee

Mr Midnight
- Author: James Lee
- Original title: Mr Midnight
- Language: English
- Genre: Horror fiction
- Publisher: Angsana Books, Flame Of The Forest Publishing (flameoftheforest.com)
- Publication date: 1998 (Earliest, Mr Midnight #1); 2025 (Latest, Mr Midnight #106)
- Publication place: Singapore

Mr Midnight (US title: Mr. Midnight) is a children's horror fiction book series written by Jim Aitchison under the pseudonym of James Lee. The series is published by Angsana Books, Flame Of The Forest Publishing. There are currently 134 books in the series, including 28 Special Edition titles. It has been translated into Burmese, Malay, Indonesian, simplified Chinese, and traditional Chinese.

Each book in the series contains two stories. The first book was titled Madman's Mansion and The Monster In Mahima's Mirror.

James Lee's books are very popular among young children and preteens and have been regarded as "Asia's answer to Harry Potter".

In 2020, the series hit a milestone when it released Mr Midnight #100 — the 100th title in the series excluding Special Editions.

== Books ==
The latest book in the Mr Midnight book series is Mr Midnight #106. It contains two story, The Eye Doctor of Doom and Manfrog.

The Complete List
| Language | English | | | Malay | | Indonesian | | Chinese | |
| Localised Title | Mr. Midnight | | | Detik Tengah Malam (Mr. Midnight until book 4) | | Mr. Midnight | | 午夜先生 惊魂系列 | |
| Translator | Original language | | Publish Date | Shajaratuddur Halim | | | | 张英（張英 | |
|---|---|---|---|---|---|---|---|---|---|
| 1 | Madman's Mansion | The Monster in Mahima's Mirror | 1998 | Rumah Agam Orang Gila | Jembalang Dalam Cermin Mahima | Rumah Hantu Gila | Monster Dalam Cermin | 魔屋 (古老怪屋） | 镜中历险记（鏡中歷險記） |
| 2 | The Case Of The Cursed Clock | Night Of The Haunted Hamburgers | 1999 | Kes Jam Sumpahan | Malam Burger Berhantu | Kasus Jam Terkutuk | Hamburger Berhantu | 邪恶的时钟（邪惡的時鐘） | 闹鬼之夜（鬧鬼之夜） |
| 3 | Scary School Bus To Nowhere | Revenge Of The Goldfish | 1999 | Bas Sekolah Yang Menakutkan | Dendam Ikan Emas | Bis Sekolah Tanpa Tujuan | Balas Dendam Ikan Mas Koki | 校车疑云（校車疑雲） | 金鱼复仇记（金魚复仇記） |
| 4 | My Creepy Computer | There's A Ghost In My Photo! | February 2002 | Komputer Seram | Hantu Dalam Gambar! | | | 恐怖电脑（恐怖電腦） | 照片幽灵（照片幽靈） |
| 5 | Happy Birthday Horrors | Eaten By Hamburgers | February 2002 | Hadiah Ngeri | Serangan Burger | | | 生日惊魂（生日驚魂） | 吃人汉堡（吃人漢堡） |
| 6 | Our Radio Won't Turn Off! | The Cinema Of Doom | January 2003 | Misteri Bunyi Radio | Pawagam Berhantu | | | 关不掉的收音机（關不掉的收音機） | 死亡影院（死亡影院） |
| 7 | Don't Get Off At The 13th Floor! | My Shoes Have Gone Nuts | September 2003 | Misteri Tingkat 13! | Kasut Gila | | | 不详的13 | 疯狂的鞋子（瘋狂的鞋子） |
| 8 | The Demon Dentist | Who Stole The Zoo? | May 2004 | Mangsa Dr Dredd | Rompakan Zoo | | | 魔鬼牙医（魔鬼牙醫） | 谁偷走了动物园（誰偷走了動物園） |
| 9 | My Handphone Is Haunted! | School Camp Terrors | May 2004 | Telefon Berhantu! | Serangan Kupu-kupu | | | 闹鬼的手机（鬧鬼的手機） | 恐怖的野营（恐怖的野營） |
| 10 | Who Else Is Living In Our House? | Our School Ghost | September 2004 | Tetamu Tak Diundang | Hantu Sekolah | | | 房子里另有其人 | 校园幽灵 |
| 11 | Don't Laugh At A Killer Clown! | My Sinister Sunglasses | September 2004 | Badut Pembunuh! | Bayangan Kaca Mata Hitam | | | 杀人小丑 | 我的诡异墨镜 |
| 12 | The Carnival Of Horrors | The Boy With Blood-Red Eyes | 5 February 2005 | Karnival Berhantu | Budak Lelaki Bermata Merah | | | 恐怖的游乐场 | 血色眼睛的男孩 |
| 13 | My Invisible Friend | Strangled By Spaghetti | 5 February 2005 | Kawan Limunan | Jerutan Spageti | | | 面条杀手 | 我的隐身朋友 |
| 14 | The Fiendish Fish Spirit | Our Ghostly Bus Stop | 5 February 2005 | Roh Ikan Ganas | Hentian Bas Berhantu | | | 凶猛的鱼王 | 幽灵徘徊的车站 |
| 15 | My Friend's Now a Mummy! | May All Your Dreams Come True | 5 February 2005 | Kawanku Pocong! | Mimpi Terjadi | | | 我朋友成了木乃伊 | 祝你美梦成真 |
| 16 | My Class Vampire | The Mad, Mad Music School | 28 May 2005 | Pontianak Kelas | Kelas Muzik Gila | | | 班级里的吸血鬼 | 疯狂的音乐学校 |
| 17 | All My Friends Have Vanished! | What's That Thing In My Pillow? | 28 May 2005 | Semua Kawanku Hilang! | Apa Dalam Bantalku? | | | 我的朋友们都失踪了 | 我的枕头里有什么 |
| 18 | The Super Scary Supermarket | Who Invited The Ghost? | 28 May 2005 | Kedai Sangat Ngeri | Siapa Undangkan Hantu? | | | 超级恐怖超市 | 谁邀请了魔鬼 |
| 19 | Flying Tiger Fist Of Shaolin | Demon's Island | 28 May 2005 | Tangan Berterbang Shaolin | Pulau Hantu | | | 少林飞虎拳 | 恶魔岛 |
| 20 | We Made A Monster | Clones In Class | 28 October 2005 | Robot Hidup | Clon Di Kelas | | | 我们制造了一个怪物 | 克隆班级 |
| 21 | Don't Go Near The Neighbors | Somebody's Stealing My Life | 28 October 2005 | Jangan Mendekati Rumah Jiran! | Seorang Mencuri Hidupku! | | | | |
| 22 | Wormhead | They Came From The Drain | 28 October 2005 | Kepala Cacing | Mereka Datang Dari Longkang | | | | |
| 23 | Good Knight, Raider Goh | Sleep Over And Die! | 28 October 2005 | Penjaga Baik, Raider Goh | Tidur Lain Tempat Dan Mati! | | | | |
| 24 | The Eight Legs Of Ang See Beng | The Demon Dentist Strikes Back | 20 January 2006 | Lapan Kaki Ang See Beng | Dr. Dredd Kembali Lagi! | | | | |
| 25 | The Wild, Wild Wolves Are Coming | My Secret Stalker | 20 January 2006 | Anjing Liar Akan Datang | Pengikut Rahsia | | | | |
| 26 | My Cursed Mask | Welcome To The Weird School | 20 January 2006 | Topeng Sumpahan | Selamat Datang Ke Sekolah Gila | | | | |
| 27 | Please Stay In Your Grave! | Forest Of Fear | 26 May 2006 | Tolong Jangan Keluar Dari Kubur! | Hutan Menakutkan | | | | |
| 28 | The People Gobblers | The Revenge Of Mahima's Monster | 26 May 2006 | Manusia Dimakan | Penbalasan Dendam Jembalang Mahina | | | | |
| 29 | My Creepy Cruise | Stranger Danger | 26 May 2006 | Krus Menakutkan | Orang Tidak Dikenali Berbahaya | | | | |
| 30 | Attack Of The Lizardmen | The Body Switchers | 15 September 2006 | Serangan Orang Cicak | Pertukaran Badan | | | | |
| 31 | Stop The Deadly Dummies! | Who Sent Me A Coffin? | 15 September 2006 | Hentikan Patung Bahaya | Siapa Menghantarkanku Kofin? | | | | |
| 32 | When The Ghosts Went Mad | Drop Dead, Gorgeous | 15 September 2006 | Bila Hantu Menjadi Gila | Jatuh Mati, Cantik | | | | |
| 33 | The Legend Of Lady Long Neck | Who's Been Cursing Me? | 19 January 2007 | Lagenda Wanita Leher Panjang | Siapa Sumpahkan Aku? | | | | |
| 34 | My Freaky Shrunken Head | Evil By Email | 19 January 2007 | Kepala Dikecilkan | Jahat Dari E-Mel | | | | |
| 35 | What's That Thing On My Hand? | River Of Shivers | 19 January 2007 | Apa Di Tanganku? | Sungai Berhantu | | | | |
| 36 | Dr Dredd And The Exploding Teeth | Dead Write | 4 May 2007 | Dr. Dredd Dan Gigi Meletup! | Tulisan Kematian | | | | |
| 37 | The Dead Are Dancing | Old Ghosts Of New York | 4 May 2007 | Hantu Bernari | Hantu Lama New York | | | | |
| 38 | Singing Swords, Dragon Drums | Have You Been Drinking Brain Juice? | 4 May 2007 | Pedang Bernyanyi, Dram Naga | Adakah Kamu Berminum Jus Otak? | | | | |
| 39 | My House Is Now A Graveyard | When The Vampire Wakes Up | 7 September 2007 | Rumahku Sekarang Sebuah Kuburan | Bila Pontianak Bangun | | | | |
| 40 | What's That Under Our School? | Magic Shop Madness | 7 September 2007 | Apa Di Bawah Sekolah? | Kedai Magic Bergila | | | | |
| 41 | There's A Witch In My Watch | Tree Boy | 7 September 2007 | Ada Penyihir Di Arlogi Saya | Anak Pokok | | | | |
| 42 | Beware Of The Gravedigger! | The Eggs Of Evil | 18 January 2008 | Pengali Kubur | Telur Jahat | | | | |
| 43 | Help Me, I'm Changing! | Tower Of Terror | 18 January 2008 | Tolong, Aku Berubah! | Menara Keganasan | | | | |
| 44 | Dr Dredd And The Dentures Of Doom | Dressed To Kill | 18 January 2008 | Dr Dredd Dan Gigi Kiamat | Berpakaian Berbunuh | | | | |
| 45 | Joshua Long, Your Hands Have Gone Wrong | Why Can't We Go Into Classroom 44? | 6 June 2008 | Joshua Long, Tangan Kamu Ada Masalah | Mengapa Kita Tidak Boleh Memasuki Kelas 44? | | | | |
| 46 | Heads Will Roll | Don't Open This Letter! | 6 June 2008 | | | | | | |
| 47 | Walking, Running Killer Fish | My Shadow Is Killing Me | 6 June 2008 | | | | | | |
| 48 | Just Before You Die | Their Master's Grave | 29 August 2008 | | | | | | |
| 49 | Old Ghosts Of Japan | Drowned But Not Dead | 29 August 2008 | | | | | | |
| 50 | Die Laughing At A Killer Clown | I Live In Coffin 4, Blood Street | 29 August 2008 | | | | | | |
| 51 | Dr Dredd's Voodoo Braces | Keep Out! This Village Is Possessed | 28 November 2008 | | | | | | |
| 52 | My Cupboard's Full of Cobras | The Girl Next To Me Is A Witch | 19 January 2009 | | | | | | |
| 53 | Terril Tan's Terrible Tongue | Do Not Call This Number | 19 January 2009 | | | | | | |
| 54 | Cross Country Creeps | The Dead Are Watching | 19 January 2009 | | | | | | |
| 55 | Where The Mad Are Buried | Dead Boy's Birthday | 15 May 2009 | | | | | | |
| 56 | Skulls At School | There's A Vampire Upstairs | 15 May 2009 | | | | | | |
| 57 | Freaky Farm | My Mad Maid | 15 May 2009 | | | | | | |
| 58 | Face Of Doom | Buried But Breathing | 15 September 2009 | | | | | | |
| 59 | The Circle of Death | When The Screaming Had To Stop | 15 September 2009 | | | | | | |
| SE 1 | When The Living Meet The Dead | | 15 September 2009 | | | | | | |
| SE 2 | Santa's Claws | The Fright Before Christmas | 20 November 2009 | | | | | | |
| 60 | The Brain Raiders | The Monsters of Monte Bello | 28 December 2009 | | | | | | |
| 61 | Who Was In That Coffin? | Deathmaster | 28 December 2009 | | | | | | |
| 62 | The Tomb of Dr. Theseus | Don't let the Eagleheads Find You | 18 March 2010 | | | | | | |
| 63 | The Sleepers Are Awake | Beware Of Iron Face | 4 June 2010 | | | | | | |
| 64 | The Beam Of Doom | The Grave Busters | 4 June 2010 | | | | | | |
| 65 | Trail Of Terror | The Creeping Corpse | 24 September 2010 | | | | | | |
| SE 3 | Trick Or Treat - Or Die | | 24 September 2010 | | | | | | |
| SE 4 | The Snowmen From Hell | | 19 November 2010 | | | | | | |
| 66 | Mangled Man | The Ghost Factory | 27 January 2011 | | | | | | |
| 67 | Here Comes The Coneheads! | Dr Dredd Drills Again | 27 January 2011 | | | | | | |
| 68 | Don't Look At The Dead! | The Haunted Hangman | 27 May 2011 | | | | | | |
| 69 | Has Anyone Seen My Head? | Dead On Midnight | 27 May 2011 | | | | | | |
| 70 | One Foot In The Grave | We Will Always Be Watching | 16 September 2011 | | | | | | |
| SE 5 | My Halloween Night Of Horrors | | 16 September 2011 | | | | | | |
| SE 6 | Our Creepiest Christmas Ever! | | 18 November 2011 | | | | | | |
| 71 | Never Look Into Their Eyes! | The Curse Of The Bloodless | 17 February 2012 | | | | | | |
| 72 | Revenge Of The Zombies | Don't Go Down Into The Basement! | 17 February 2012 | | | | | | |
| 73 | Who's Been Knocking On My Door? | The Ghosts Of Old Nuggety | 24 June 2012 | | | | | | |
| 74 | Jordon Koh, Where Did You Go? | My Night In A Haunted Hotel | 24 June 2012 | | | | | | |
| 75 | My School Is A Dead Zone | Our Postman Is A Ghost | 14 September 2012 | | | | | | |
| SE 7 | The Halloween Graveyard Train | | 14 September 2012 | | | | | | |
| SE 8 | Santa And The Christmas Slime | | 20 November 2012 | | | | | | |
| 76 | The League of the Dead | The Whistling Ghost | 4 February 2013 | | | | | | |
| 77 | Look Out – It's the Bag Man! | Ghost Bees | 4 February 2013 | | | | | | |
| 78 | The Rise of the Barbarian | The Dreaded Ones | 30 May 2013 | | | | | | |
| 79 | The Curse Of The Cobweb People | The Dinosaur Ghost | 30 May 2013 | | | | | | |
| 80 | When Ghosts Get Married | Revenge Of The Golden Poison Frog | 20 September 2013 | | | | | | |
| 81 | Vampires From The Swamp | The Night The Undead Died | 20 September 2013 | | | | | | |
| SE 9 | The Ghost Riders Of Halloween | | 20 September 2013 | | | | | | |
| SE 10 | I'm Dreaming Of A Weird Christmas | | 22 November 2013 | | | | | | |
| 82 | Melvin, Melvin, Are You Out There? | The Lost Ghosts of Red Hill | 5 February 2014 | | | | | | |
| 83 | My Spooky Bathroom | The Mad Mad Music In My Head | 13 June 2014 | | | | | | |
| 84 | The Hand of Doom | Grinning Ghosts | 13 June 2014 | | | | | | |
| 85 | Green Eye, Red Eye | The Ghost That Wouldn't Die | 29 September 2014 | | | | | | |
| SE 11 | The Flying Broomsticks Of Halloween | | 29 September 2014 | | | | | | |
| 86 | Slither | The Bones Of Bok Choo Bin | 2 March 2015 | | | | | | |
| 87 | Dian And The Dead Men | Skull Duggery | 2 March 2015 | | | | | | |
| 88 | Flyboy | Dead Man's Lake | 31 July 2015 | | | | | | |
| 89 | The Rage Of The Dead | I Just Saw My Own Ghost! | 31 July 2015 | | | | | | |
| SE 12 | The Beasts Of Halloween | | 11 November 2015 | | | | | | |
| SE 13 | Santa and the Evil Elves | | 4 December 2015 | | | | | | |
| 90 | Riverboat Ghosts | The Scares Upstairs | 18 March 2016 | | | | | | |
| 91 | Run! It's The Rubber Man! | My Super Scary School | 18 March 2016 | | | | | | |
| 92 | Mountain of Terror | The Headless Horror | 17 June 2016 | | | | | | |
| 93 | When The Dead Go Shopping | Zombie Brains | 17 June 2016 | | | | | | |
| SE 14 | The Dead Are Back For Halloween | | 30 September 2016 | | | | | | |
| SE 15 | The Curse Of The Sinister Santa | | 25 November 2016 | | | | | | |
| SE 16 | Hong Bao Horrors | | 13 January 2017 | | | | | | |
| 94 | The Face In The Window | The Cemetery's Secret | 4 May 2017 | | | | | | |
| SE 17 | My Graveyard Halloween | | 12 October 2017 | | | | | | |
| SE 18 | The Christmas Tree Of Doom | | 1 December 2017 | | | | | | |
| SE 19 | I've Got Ghosts In My New Year | | 2 February 2018 | | | | | | |
| 95 | Jessica Sim Is Screaming! | Bad Men Make Bad Ghosts | 2 February 2018 | | | | | | |
| 96 | Bring On The Bats! | The Dead Want You | 1 June 2018 | | | | | | |
| SE 20 | The Halloween Vikings Invade! | | 4 October 2018 | | | | | | |
| SE 21 | What’s Wrong With Mrs Santa? | | 18 December 2018 | | | | | | |
| SE 22 | Who Stole Luxi's Luck? | | 18 February 2019 | | | | | | |
| 97 | Mountain Of Madness | The Bus That Never Came Back | 18 February 2019 | | | | | | |
| 98 | Into The Dark Unknown | The Hangman Never Waits | 9 June 2019 | | | | | | |
| 99 | The House On Deadman's Hill | Crawling Flesh | 4 October 2019 | | | | | | |
| SE 23 | My Halloween At Doomton Abbey | | 4 October 2019 | | | | | | |
| SE 24 | The Night Of The Sinister Santa | | 11 December 2019 | | | | | | |
| SE 25 | There’s A Monster In My Mandarin! | | 31 January 2020 | | | | | | |
| 100 | He Swims Without Water | Our School Ghoul | 27 November 2020 | | | | | | |
| 101 | Ship Of Ghosts | Dead Of Night | 15 September 2021 | | | | | | |
| SE 26 | My Christmas Tree Turned Creepy! | | 15 December 2021 | | | | | | |
| 102 | Seng And The Scottish Cannibals | The She-Ghost From The Drain | 20 June 2022 | | | | | | |
| SE 27 | Halloween House Of Bones | | 15 October 2022 | | | | | | |
| 103 | My Ghost Positioning System | Vampires, Vampires, Vampires! | 9 December 2022 | | | | | | |
| 104 | Zombies In the Zoo | Underground with the Dead | 29 June 2023 | | | | | | |
| SE 28 | Ronan’s Ratty Christmas | | 11 December 2023 | | | | | | |
| 105 | Here Come The Supersize Centipedes! | Jaws in the Storm | 27 September 2024 | | | | | | |
| 106 | The Eye Doctor of Doom | Manfrog | 31 August 2025 | | | | | | |

== Netflix series ==
In February 2015, a promotional image for a new Mr Midnight television series was posted on the Mr Midnight Facebook page. It featured a Mr Midnight logo with a pair of eyes peeking out from behind the logo. The caption underneath the logo read, "The hit book series that has scared thousands of kids across Asia is coming to television!" Any other details about the upcoming series were unknown, except that the series would most likely be adaptations of the stories.

However, an update was finally released by the publisher on Instagram and Facebook in late September 2022 with the announcement that the TV series, produced by Beach House Pictures, would be released on Netflix to a worldwide audience. Titled Mr. Midnight: Beware the Monsters, the series premiered on 24 October 2022.

== Movie ==
A movie titled Mr. Midnight the Movie: My Haunted Holiday was in the works but was cancelled as the producers thought the movie would not suit the book's style.
