= James Lee (writer) =

Australian writer (born 1947)

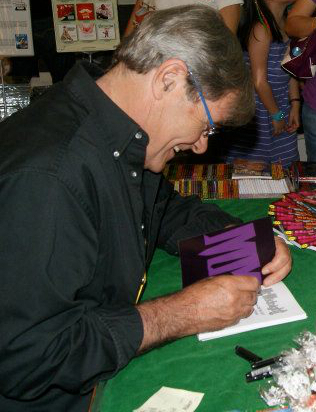
- Lee at a book signing in 2012.
- Born: Jim Aitchison; 1947 (age 78–79); Australia
- Occupation: Author
- Writing career
- Pen name: James Lee; David Carrick
- Period: 1998 to present
- Genres: Horror and Mystery
- Notable works: Mr. Midnight and Mr. Mystery
- Website: flameoftheforest.com

Jim Aitchison (born 1947), better known by his pen name James Lee, is an Australian writer.

== Biography ==
Born in Australia, Aitchison lived in Singapore as a permanent resident from 1983 until 2010 when he returned to Langwarrin, Victoria. Before he became a full-time writer, Aitchison was a voice actor, and creative director of an advertising agency. He also published books on business and advertising.

== Works ==
Aitchison's earliest work was a script called Under Her Spell written for Grace Gibson Radio Productions using the pseudonym David Carrick. While working for an advertising agency, Aitchison penned the first two episodes and slipped them under the office door. Grace's assistant Reg James passed them on to Grace who put them in production. The serial lasted 130 episodes and starred Fay Kelton, James Condon and Diana Perryman.

He gained popularity in the late 1990s when he began writing the children's horror book series, Mr. Midnight, under the pseudonym of James Lee after his publisher, Flame Of The Forest Publishing, came up with the idea of publishing a series of horror and suspense stories for children using Asian names and backdrops - which was considered refreshing for Singaporean audiences who were used to existing Western literature. The series was anthological in nature, each book containing two stories where readers would contribute to the characters' backstories and settings while James would flesh the stories out in their entirety. The series became widely popular not just in Singapore, but also neighbouring Malaysia, Thailand, Indonesia, Hong Kong, China, and Vietnam with over three million copies sold.

In March 2006, Aitchison launched the Mr. Mystery series, which catered to the same demographic group as Mr Midnight, but with murder mystery stories solved by a group of characters.

In June 2009, Aitchison launched a new series called The Young Immortals, featuring the trio of Train Tang, Jeffry Hunter and Tamaryn.

Aitchison's other works include the Sarong Party Girl series (1994, 1995, 1996), The Seriously Funny Anti-Stress Book (1995), and Terror In Bali: An Eyewitness Account (2003).

He also penned the lyrics of some songs used for the National Day Parade in Singapore such as "One People, One Nation, One Singapore" and "My Singapore Story". In 1998, Aitchison penned the prose work Recollections, a recount of the different phases of Singaporean history read at National Day ceremonies held in schools across the island.

In 2014 and 2015, Aitchison released two books on the history of Grace Gibson Radio Productions. The books, co-authored by Reg James, were titled Yes, Miss Gibson and A Theatre in My Mind.

== Awards ==
In 2013, Aitchison won the inaugural "Australian Arts in Asia Awards" for his Mr Midnight and Mr Mystery series.

== See also ==
- Mr. Midnight
- Mr. Mystery
- Russell Lee
