= Chen Xi (actor) =

Singaporean actor (born 1991)

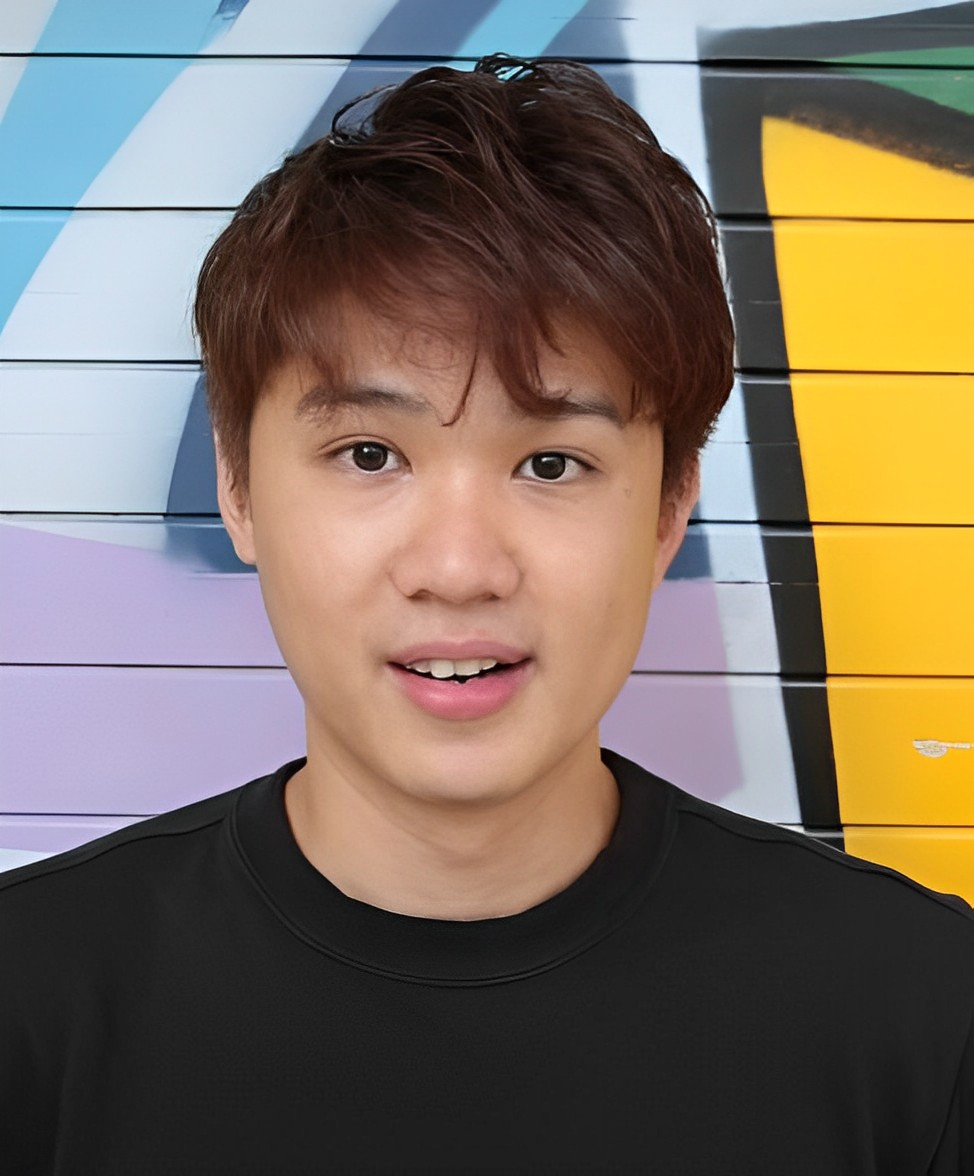
- Chen in November 2017
- Born: 23 May 1991 (age 35); Singapore
- Other name: Chen Yixi
- Education: Nanyang Technological University
- Occupations: Actor; artist; illustrator; host; entrepreneur
- Years active: 2011−present
- Spouse: Mimi (m. 2025)
- Parents: Xiang Yun; Edmund Chen
- Relatives: Chen Yixin (sister)

Birth and current stage name
- Traditional Chinese: 陳熙
- Simplified Chinese: 陈熙
- Hanyu Pinyin: Chén Xī

Former stage name
- Traditional Chinese: 陳一熙
- Simplified Chinese: 陈一熙
- Hanyu Pinyin: Chén Yīxī

Legal name
- Traditional Chinese: 陳一凞
- Simplified Chinese: 陈一凞
- Hanyu Pinyin: Chén Yīxī

Chen Xi (born 23 May 1991), formerly known as Chen Yixi, is a Singaporean actor and artist.

== Early life ==
Chen Xi (陈熙) is the son of artistes Edmund Chen and Xiang Yun, and the brother of actress Chen Yixin. He graduated from the School of Art, Design and Media at Nanyang Technological University in 2016.

Chen Xi has always had a strong interest in the arts and media industry, particularly in the visual arts, since he was young. This drive has continued to push him to explore new mediums and create his own art. Specializing in illustrations and watercolor works, Chen Xi enjoys practicing his art whenever he is overseas, sketching and painting different sceneries as a hobby and self-expression.

== Career ==
Chen Xi (陈熙) is a versatile actor and practicing watercolor artist. He has worked with various brands and contributed to numerous art galleries. As an artist, he released a book titled "Xi the World" in 2017, compiling his sketches of Mediacorp at Caldecott Hill. He sells art prints and conducts art workshops through the brand "The Xi Atelier" and offers a cat artwork commission service called "Nekolour." Additionally, he is a partner of "Clump A Dump," a cat litter brand, where he is primarily responsible for art direction and marketing.

Chen Xi starred in the 2011 anthology film Echoing Love. The following year, he starred in the web series i.Rock. In 2017, he starred in the Dick Lee film Wonder Boy. In the same year, he starred in the television drama 118 Reunion. He also appeared in the series Kin and Nightwatchers. His other notable appearances include We the Citizens. He starred in My One in a Million. He appeared in Healing Heroes and You Can Be An Angel 4. Chen Xi continues to be active in the media industry, working with Mediacorp on a project-by-project basis and contributing as an actor and visual artist.

== Personal life ==
Born Chen Xi (陈熙), his parents changed his name to Chen Yixi (陈一凞) when he was 9, upon the advice of a Fengshui master. To date, his name remains as Chen Yixi (陈一凞) on official documents. In November 2021, Chen announced that he is adopting his birth name, Chen Xi (陈熙), which was given by his parents, as his new stage name. He formerly used the stage name Chen Yixi (陈一熙).

During his secondary school years, Chen, unfortunately, contracted a corneal infection that led to a partial loss of vision in his left eye. Initially, a doctor advised the removal of his left eye to prevent the infection from reaching his brain, but this procedure was not carried out. After nearly eight years of searching for a cure, Chen received a partial corneal transplant, operated by Dr Julian Theng during his time in the army, and has since recovered 75% of his vision in his left eye.

At the Star Awards 2023, Chen's mother Xiang Yun revealed that Chen will be heading to the United Kingdom in September 2023 to further his studies, when accepting the Evergreen Artiste award. Chen expressed shock and later said that he had actually wanted to "quietly fade away to the UK" without making any media announcements. In an interview in August 2023, Chen estimated that he would be spending a substantial amount on his 1-year King's College London arts management masters course, including accommodation and living expenses. He was accepted for the course in 2019 but COVID-19 had disrupted his plans.

Chen said he would still be in the media industry, working with Mediacorp on a project-by-project basis and continuing to contribute as an actor upon completing his master's degree.

On 14 July 2025, Chen married Mimi, a Japanese whom he met through an online language-exchange application in 2020.

== Filmography ==
Chen has appeared in the following programmes and films:

=== Television series ===
- Life Less Ordinary (2017)
- 118 Reunion (2017)
- While We Are Young (2017)
- 29th February (2018)
- Fifty & Fabulous (2018; cameo)
- Reach for the Skies (2018)
- My One in a Million (2019)
- Dear Neighbours (2019)
- Hello From The Other Side (2019)
- Kin (2020)
- Terror Within (2020)
- In the Wind (2020)
- Reunion (2021)
- You Can Be An Angel 4 (2021)
- Nightwatchers (2021)
- Soul Doctor (2022)
- Healing Heroes (2022)
- Fix My Life (2023)

=== Web series ===
- I-Rock (2015)
- A Lonely Fish (2018)
- Love at Cavenagh Bridge (2018)

=== Film ===
- Echoing Love (2011)
- Wonder Boy (2017)

=== Variety and reality show ===
- The Nationals (2019)
- The Backward Race (2019; children's programme)

== Bibliography ==
- Xi the World (2017)

== Awards and nominations ==
Year	Award	Category	Nominated work	Result	Ref.
2021	Star Awards	Top 10 Most Popular Male Artistes	—N/a	Nominated	
2023	Star Awards	Top 10 Most Popular Male Artistes	—N/a	Nominated	
