= Xiang Yun =

Singaporean actress and television host (born 1961)

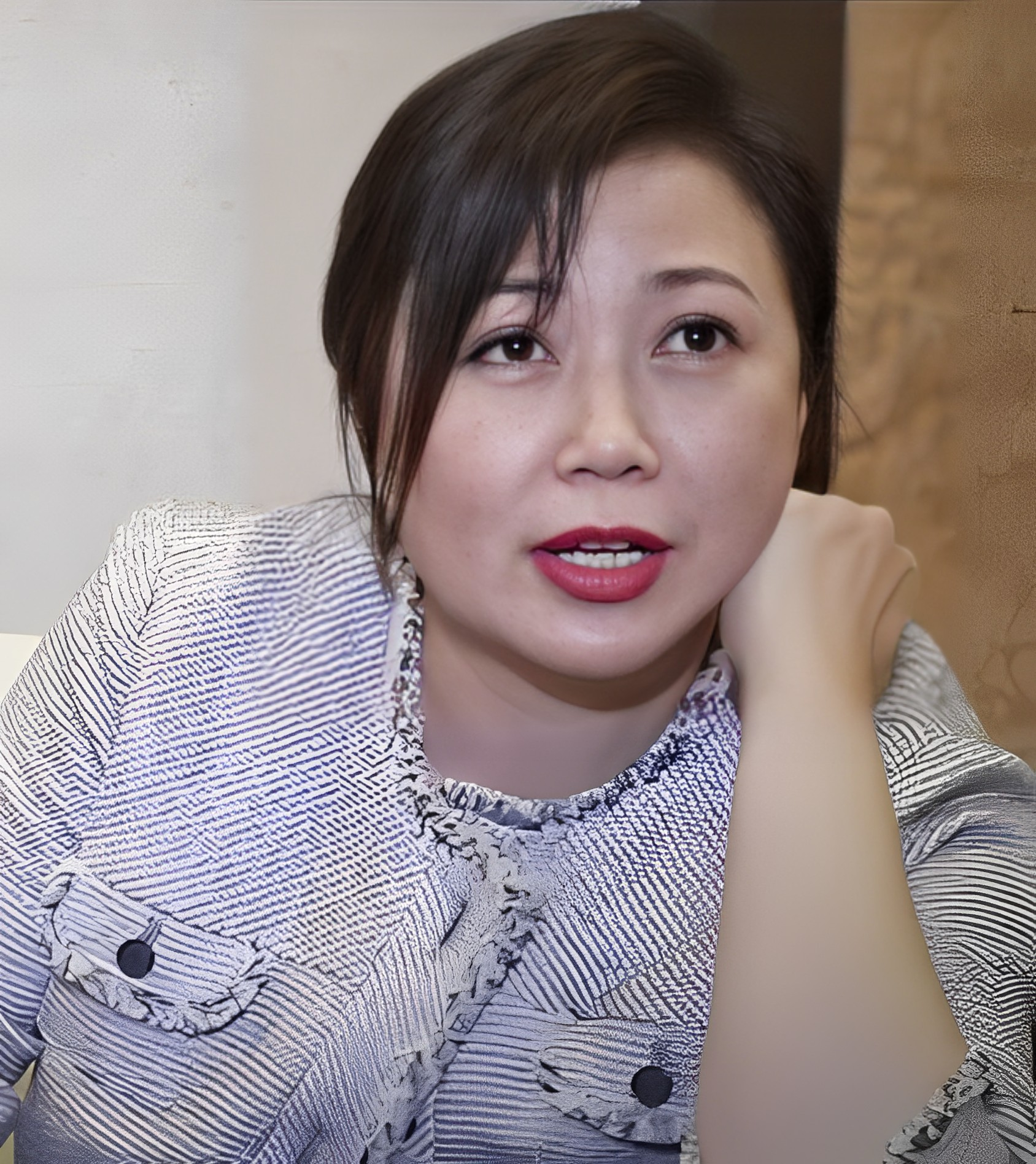
- Xiang in May 2017
- Born: Chen Cuichang; 27 October 1961 (age 65); Singapore
- Occupations: Actress; television host
- Years active: 1980–present
- Spouse: Edmund Chen (m. 1989)
- Children: Chen Xi; Chen Yixin
- Mother: Chew Koi
- Relatives: Loretta Chen (sister-in-law)
- Awards: Full list

Stage name
- Traditional Chinese: 向雲
- Simplified Chinese: 向云
- Hanyu Pinyin: Xiàng Yún
- Wade–Giles: Hsiang4 Yün2
- Jyutping: Hoeng3 Wan4
- Hokkien POJ: Hiòng-hûn
- Tâi-lô: Hiòng-hûn

Birth name (Chen Cuichang)
- Traditional Chinese: 陳翠嫦
- Simplified Chinese: 陈翠嫦
- Hanyu Pinyin: Chén Cuìcháng
- Wade–Giles: Ch'en1 Ts'ui4 Ch'ang2
- Jyutping: Can4 Ceoi3 Soeng4
- Hokkien POJ: Tân Chhùi-siông
- Tâi-lô: Tân Tshuì-siông

Xiang Yun (born Chen Cuichang on 27 October 1961) is a Singaporean actress and television host. She is commonly referred to as MediaCorp's first "Ah Jie" (senior actress) for being among the first locally trained artistes and has been in the entertainment industry for more than 29 years.

== Career ==
Chen is one of the first batch of graduates from SBC's drama training class. She began her career in children's drama in 1980 and proceeded to act in the drama series Double Blessings and All That Glitters Is Not Gold in 1983. It was her role as "Ah Mei", love interest of Huang Wenyong's character "Ah Shui", in the 1984 blockbuster drama series The Awakening that propelled her to fame, evidenced by the fact that she and Huang were named among the "Top 5 Favourite On-Screen Partners" and "Top 5 Most Memorable Drama Characters" of the last 25 years at the Star Awards 2007 anniversary special.

Chen made her theatrical debut as the female lead Li Qing in December Rains, written by veteran songwriter Liang Wern Fook and Jimmy Ye.

In 1997, Chen played Singaporean war heroine Elizabeth Choy in the war drama The Price of Peace. After the birth of her second child, she took a brief hiatus from acting. She returned to television in 2000 and has since been cast in major roles in many of MediaCorp's large-scale productions, such as Double Happiness, Portrait of Home, The Little Nyonya and Kinship.

Despite competition from younger actresses, Chen's popularity remained high as she was voted the "Top 10 Most Popular Artistes" in the annual Star Awards from 2000 to 2010 and was awarded the coveted "All-Time Favourite Artiste Award". She has also won the "Best Supporting Actress" award for a record five times, in years 1998, 2000, 2001, 2009 and 2023.

== Personal life ==
Chen is married to former MediaCorp actor Edmund Chen. They first met on the set of Patrol and married after a whirlwind romance, which drew much media attention as unpublicised celebrity marriages were uncommon in the local entertainment industry at that time. They have a son, Chen Xi, and a daughter, Yixin, both of whom are also actors.

On 12 September 2023, Chen revealed that her mother died of kidney failure, aged 84.

== Filmography ==
=== Television series ===
Year	Title	Role	Notes	Ref.
1983	All that Glitters is Not Gold 捷径			
1983	Army Series 新兵小传	Cousin		
1983	Double Blessings 春风得意	He Cuifang		
1984	The Awakening 1	Ah Mei		
1984	Blossoms in the Sun 阳光蜜糖	Lin Liting		
1984	The Awakening 2	Ah Mei		
1985	The Unyielding Butterflies 铁蝴蝶	Fu Xuejun		
1985	Takeover 人在旅途	Ye Qianyun		
1985	The Coffee Shop 咖啡乌	Hong Jinhua		
1986	Men of Valour 盗日英雄传	Princess Jian Guo		
1986	The Bond 天涯同命鸟	Hong Jinfeng		
1987	Painted Faces 戏班	Bai Mudan		
1987	Painted Faces 戏班	Bai Lanxiang		
1987	Around People's Park			
1988	Heiress 世纪情	Zhao Wan'er		
1988	Airforce	Fang Zijun		
1988	The Last Applause 舞榭歌台	Lan Xinyi		
1988	Mystery 迷离夜 之《琴》	Zhao Yongqin		
1988	Strange Encounters 2 奇缘2 之《客途秋恨》	Piaohong		
1989	Patrol 铁警雄风	Zhou Huijuan		
1989	Return of the Prince 丝路谜城	Jin Lvyi		
1990	Enchanted Eyes 天眼	Na Lan Rong Yu		
1990	Enchanted Eyes 天眼	Liu Muchan		
1990	Wishing Well 幻海奇遇 之《错体夫妻》	Li Liming		
1992	The Male Syndrome 妙男正传	Chuan Qi Xing Zi		
1992	Woman of Substance 悲欢岁月	Chen Qiuyan		
1993	The Wilful Siblings 斗气姐妹	Betty		
1993	Endless Love 未了缘	Liu Huilian		
1993	Endless Love 未了缘	Liu Xiaohan		
1993	Angel of Vengeance 暴雨狂花	Cai Yihua		
1994	Scorned Angel 冷太阳	Ma Miaoqing		
1994	Against All Odds 共闯荆途	Zhang Yongmei		
1995	The Golden Pillow 金枕头	Sai Guixiang		
1995	King of Hades 阎罗传奇	Nian Nu		
1995	The Last Rhythm 曲终魂断	Liang Ya Song (Ya Zi)		
1996	Mirror of Life 实况剧场 之《三水红头巾》	Pan Yueyin		
1996	Give Me a Break 老板放轻松	Wang Wenfang		
1996	Tales of the Third Kind II 第三类剧场2 之《杀夫之谜》	Wang Cuiyun		
1996	Diary of a Teacher 老师日记	Kong Ai Si		
1997	The Price of Peace	Elizabeth Choy		
1997	Immortal Love 不老传说	Chen Shulan		
1998	Living in Geylang 芽笼芽笼	Zhu Xiuli		
1998	Myths and Legends of Singapore 石叻坡传说 之《求子树》	Li Yuzhen		
1998	Singapore Short Stories 小说剧场 之《天算》	Lu Shanshan		
1998	Around People's Park 珍珠街坊	A-hua		
1998	The Royal Monk 2 真命小和尚之十二铜人	Leng Xiaofeng		
1999	Hero of the Times 新方世玉	Wu Huaniang		
1999	My Teacher, My Friend 小岛醒了	Aunt Pig Liver		
1999	Wok of Life 福满人间	Margaret Ma Dai Xiang		
2000	My Home Affairs 家事	A-yan		
2000	Looking for Stars 星锁	Yuan Shuwei		
2001	The Hotel 大酒店	Diana	Special appearance	
2001	The Challenge 谁与争锋	Wang Liguang		
2002	Fantasy 星梦情真	Yao Huiru		
2002	Kopi-O II 浓浓咖啡乌	Hong Jinhua		
2002	Bukit Ho Swee 河水山	Liao Meijiao		
2002	Health Matters 一切由慎开始	Cai Jinzhen		
2002	I Not Stupid 小孩不笨	Wen Shiya	TV adaptation of the eponymous movie	
2003	Always on My Mind 无炎的爱	Wang Wei		
2003	Holland V 荷兰村	Su Yueping		
2004	The Crime Hunters 心网追凶	Le Qi		
2004	Double Happiness 喜临门	Luo Jiaxi		
2004	Double Happiness II 喜临门 II	Luo Jiaxi		
2005	Portrait of Home 同心圆	Zhang Xiuhua		
2005	Portrait of Home II 同心圆 II	Zhang Xiuhua		
2006	Yours Always 让爱自邮	Li Huifen		
2006	Love at 0°C	Liao Qunfang		
2006	I Not Stupid Too	Xu Xiumei	TV adaptation of the eponymous movie	
2007	Let It Shine	Guo Yaoyao's mother		
2007	Kinship 手足	Lin Meiqi		
2007	Kinship 2 手足 II	Lin Meiqi		
2008	The Defining Moment 沸腾冰点	Tang Lilian		
2008	The Little Nyonya	Wang Tianlan		
2008	The Little Nyonya	Yamamoto Yueniang		
2009	Housewives' Holiday	Zhong Aiqin		
2009	Baby Bonus	Huang Meiling		
2010	Priceless Wonder	Su Bizhu		
2010	Unriddle	Yang Qiujun		
2010	The Score	Xu Anna		
2011	A Tale of 2 Cities	Wang Cuilan		
2012	Unriddle 2	Yang Qiujun		
2012	Pillow Talk	Mao Yunling		
2012	Yours Fatefully	Liu Xiuying		
2012	Beyond	Zhang Cuiyan		
2013	Start-Up! 创！	Fang Wenxin		
2013	Love at Risk	Shi Sanmei		
2014	Served H.O.T 烧。卖	Li Yueniang	Cameo	
2014	The Caregivers	Molly		
2015	You Can Be an Angel Too	Wang Ruo'en		
2015	Super Senior	Yu Fang		
2015	Sealed with a Kiss	Cheng Xinshan		
2016	House of Fortune	Chen Xiulian		
2016	Peace & Prosperity	Shen Ping'an		
2016	My First School 快乐第一班	Lin Yixin		
2016	You Can Be an Angel 2	Wang Ruo'en		
2016	Hero 大英雄	Quan Min'er		
2017	Life Less Ordinary	Wu Xiaoqiao		
2017	The Lead	Chen Xiangrong		
2017	Eat Already? 2	Meiling		
2018	Love at Cavenagh Bridge 加文纳桥的约定	Li Huiyi		
2018	Divided 分裂	Li-Zhu Huimin		
2018	Dream Walkers 梦行者	Fang Hua		
2018	Heart To Heart 心点心	Yang Fengzhu		
2019	How Are You?	Zhang Jingyu		
2019	Voyage of Love 爱起航	Hong Yuxia		
2019	Dear Neighbours 我的左邻右里	Bella Tan Meizhen		
2019	My One in a Million 我的万里挑一	Xu Cuifeng		
2019	The Little Nyonya 小娘惹	Chen Laotai	China's adaptation of the 2008 original series	
2019	A World of Difference 都市狂想	Xu Xiangqun		
2020	Happy Prince 快乐王子	Bai Biqiu		
2020	A Jungle Survivor 森林生存记	Ada		
2021	Mind Jumper 触心罪探	Esther Fang		
2021	Soul Old Yet So Young 心里住着老灵魂	Tang Meiyao		
2021	Watch Out! Alexius 小心啊！谢宇航	Liz		
2021	Key Witness 关键证人	Mary		
2021	The Heartland Hero	A-hua		
2022	You Can Be an Angel 4 你也可以是天使4	Wang Ruo'en		
2022	Your World in Mine	Wang Jinhui		
2022	Healing Heroes 医生不是神	Lei Cailuan		
2023	My One and Only	Ma Huiling		
2025	The Gift of Time			

=== Film ===
Year	Title	Role	Notes	Ref.
1995	When A Child is Born (有儿万事足)	Wang Lichang	Telemovie	
2002	I Not Stupid	Wen Shiya		
2003	Sweet Dreams and Turtle Soup	Mei Choo	Telemovie	
2003	Homerun	Kun's mother		
2006	I Not Stupid Too	Mrs Yeo		
2012	We Not Naughty	Mrs Chen		
2014	Ms J Contemplates Her Choice	Stacey Yang		
2019	The Play Book (爱本)	Passerby		
2020	Precious Is the Night	Old Madam		
2024	Money No Enough 3	Ah Hui's wife		

== Theatre ==
Year	Title	Role	Notes	Ref.
1996	December Rains	Li Qing		

== Awards and nominations ==
Organisation	Year	Category	Nominated work	Result	Ref.
Asian Television Awards	2014	Best Actress in a Supporting Role	The Caregivers	Nominated	
Asian Television Awards	2015	Best Actress in a Supporting Role	You Can Be an Angel Too	Nominated	
ContentAsia Awards	2023	Best Supporting Actress in a TV Programme/Series	Your World in Mine	Won	
Star Awards	1995	Special Achievement Award	—N/a	Won	
Star Awards	1995	Top 10 Most Popular Female Artistes	—N/a	Nominated	
Star Awards	1996	Top 10 Most Popular Female Artistes	—N/a	Nominated	
Star Awards	1997	Best Supporting Actress	Around People's Park	Won	
Star Awards	1997	Top 10 Most Popular Female Artistes	—N/a	Nominated	
Star Awards	1998	Top 10 Most Popular Female Artistes	—N/a	Nominated	
Star Awards	2000	Best Supporting Actress	My Home Affairs	Won	
Star Awards	2000	Top 10 Most Popular Female Artistes	—N/a	Won	
Star Awards	2001	Best Supporting Actress	The Challenge	Won	
Star Awards	2001	Top 10 Most Popular Female Artistes	—N/a	Won	
Star Awards	2002	Top 10 Most Popular Female Artistes	—N/a	Won	
Star Awards	2003	Best Supporting Actress	Holland V	Nominated	
Star Awards	2003	Top 10 Most Popular Female Artistes	—N/a	Won	
Star Awards	2004	Top 10 Most Popular Female Artistes	—N/a	Won	
Star Awards	2005	Top 10 Most Popular Female Artistes	—N/a	Won	
Star Awards	2006	Best Supporting Actress	Love at 0°C	Nominated	
Star Awards	2006	Top 10 Most Popular Female Artistes	—N/a	Won	
Star Awards	2007	Best Evergreen Veteran	—N/a	Won	
Star Awards	2007	Top 10 Most Popular Female Artistes	—N/a	Won	
Star Awards	2009	Best Supporting Actress	The Little Nyonya	Won	
Star Awards	2009	Top 10 Most Popular Female Artistes	—N/a	Won	
Star Awards	2010	Best Supporting Actress	Baby Bonus	Nominated	
Star Awards	2010	Top 10 Most Popular Female Artistes	—N/a	Won	
Star Awards	2011	Best Supporting Actress	Unriddle	Nominated	
Star Awards	2011	All-Time Favourite Artiste	—N/a	Won	
Star Awards	2013	Best Supporting Actress	Pillow Talk	Nominated	
Star Awards	2014	Best Supporting Actress	Beyond	Nominated	
Star Awards	2014	Star Awards for Most Popular Regional Artiste (China)	—N/a	Nominated	
Star Awards	2015	Best Supporting Actress	The Caregivers	Nominated	
Star Awards	2015	Star Awards for Most Popular Regional Artiste (China)	—N/a	Nominated	
Star Awards	2016	Best Evergreen Artiste	Super Senior	Nominated	
Star Awards	2016	Favourite Female Character	Super Senior	Nominated	
Star Awards	2017	Best Evergreen Artiste	Peace & Prosperity	Won	
Star Awards	2018	Best Evergreen Artiste	—N/a	Nominated	
Star Awards	2018	Best Theme Song	"小人物向前冲" (Life Less Ordinary)	Nominated	
Star Awards	2019	Best Evergreen Artiste	—N/a	Won	
Star Awards	2021	Best Evergreen Artiste	—N/a	Nominated	
Star Awards	2022	Best Evergreen Artiste	—N/a	Won	
Star Awards	2023	Best Supporting Actress	Your World in Mine	Won	
Star Awards	2023	Best Evergreen Artiste	—N/a	Won	
Star Awards	2023	Favourite Female Show Stealer	Your World in Mine	Nominated	
Star Awards	2026	Best Supporting Actress	The Gift of Time	Nominated	
