= List of programmes broadcast by NTV7 =

Programmes by Malaysian broadcaster

This is a list of television programmes currently, rerunning and formerly on NTV7 in Malaysia.

== Home learning plans ==
- DidikTV KPM

== American drama series ==
- 24 (Season 4)
- Medium
- The Shield
- New Girl
- The Simpsons (Season 10 Aired on TV1 in 2006) (Season 11-13, October 2006 to December 2011)
- Grey's Anatomy (Season 1 Aired on TV3 in 2006) (Season 2-7, October 2006 to December 2011)
- Private Practice (3 Seasons - June 2008 to 3 December 2010)
- Suburgatory
- Witches of East End
- The River
- The Blacklist
- Drawn Together
- The Cape
- A to Z

Series	Season (production year)	Episodes	Air date
Bones	1 (2005–2006)	22	2006
Bones	2 (2006–2007)	21	2007
Bones	3 (2007–2008)	15	2008
Bones	4 (2008–2009)	26	Episode 1–15: February 2009 – July 2009 Episode 16–26: October 2009 – December 2009
Bones	5 (2009–2010)	22	
Fringe	1 (2008–2009)	20	2 January 2010 – June 2010
Fringe	2 (2009–2010)	23	18 July 2010 – 26 December 2010
Fringe	3 (2010–2011)	22	
The Mentalist	1 (2008–2009)	23	July 2009 – December 2009
The Mentalist	2 (2009–2010)	23	September 2010 – March 2011
Lie to Me	1 (2008–2009)	13	July 2009 – September 2009
Lie to Me	2 (2009–2010)	22	15 August 2011
CSI:Las Vegas			2001 –
CSI: Miami			2002 –
CSI: NY			2004 –
Survivor			2001
Glee	Volume 1: Road to Sectionals	22	16 May 2010
Glee	Season 1: Volume 2: Road to Regionals	22	January 2011
Glee	Season 2	22	November 2011
Drop Dead Diva	Season 1		2011
Eastwick			6 August 2011

== Hong Kong drama series ==
=== TVB drama series ===
Airing date	Title	Production year and cast
	Journey to the West II	1998
2001	Mystery Files	1997
2001	A Recipe for the Heart	1997
2001	Rural Hero	1998
2001	Web of Love	1998
2001	Old Time Buddy-To Catch A Thief	1998
2001	The Duke of Mount Deer	1998
2001	Aiming High	1998
2001	Happy Ever After	1999
2002	Dragon Love	1999
2002	Face to Face	1999
2002	A Loving Spirit	1999
2002	Side Beat	1999
2002	A Matter of Business	1999
2002	A Smiling Ghost Story	1999
2002	The Legend of Lady Yang	2000
2003	Ups and Downs	2000
2003	The Kung fu Master	2000
2003	Lost in Love	2000
2004	Crimson Sabre	2000
2004	Eternal Happiness	2001
2004	The King of Yesterday and Tomorrow	2003
2005	Treasure Raiders	2002
2005	Network Love Story	2002
2005	Lofty Waters Verdant Bow	2002
1 November 2007	Revolving Doors of Vengeance	2005
2007	The Gentle Crackdown	2005
2007	To Catch the Uncatchable	2005
2007	Shades of Truth	2004
2008	My Family	2005
19 February 2008	Ten Brothers	2005
19 February 2008	Strike at Heart	2005
March 2008	Into Thin Air	2005
April 2008	The Herbalist's Manual	2005
15 April 2008	Placebo Cure	2005
16 May 2008	The Charm Beneath	2005
June 2008	Guts of Man	2004
June 2008	Always Ready	2005
16 July 2008	Bar Bender	2006
7 August 2008	A Pillow Case of Mystery	2006
2 September 2008	Safe Guards	2006
7 September 2008	Trimming Success	2006
7 October 2008	The Dance of Passion	2006
27 October 2008	Forensic Heroes	2006
January 2009	Under the Canopy of Love	2006
16 February 2009	War and Destiny	2006
April 2009	C.I.B. Files	2006
June 2009	La Femme Desperado	2006
August 2009	Love Guaranteed	2006
16 September 2009	The Family Link	2007
November 2009	Men in Pain	2006
January 2010	On the First Beat	2007
March 2010	Steps	2007
26 April 2010	Men Don't Cry	2007
14 June 2010	Fathers and Sons	2007
10 August 2010	The Price of Greed	2006
27 September 2010	Forensic Heroes II	2008
6 December 2010	When Easterly Showers Fall on the Sunny West	2008
15 February 2011	Sweetness in the Salt	2009
13 March 2011	EU	2009
22 June 2011	The Greatness of a Hero	2009
9 August 2011	Born Rich	2009
16 November 2011	The Threshold of a Persona	2009
7 February 2012	The Stew of Life	2009
17 April 2012	A Pillow Case of Mystery II	2010
5 June 2012	A Watchdog's Tale	2010
23 July 2012	The Season of Fate	2010

2012

- Sisters of Pearl (18 September)
- Ghost Writer (27 November)
- Links to Temptation

2013

- Gun Metal Grey (18 January)
- Wax and Wane (10 April)
- The Other Truth (Sponsored by commercial 19 June 10 minute Dymano Koko Krunch Nivea Chipsmore Bio Essence) (19 June)
- Lives of Omission (19 August)
- River of Wine (30 October)
- Forensic Heroes III (25 December)

2014

- The Last Steep Ascent (19 February)
- Gloves Come Off (23 April)
- Daddy Good Deeds (23 June)
- Three Kingdoms RPG (6 August)
- Inbound Troubles (6 October)
- Highs and Lows (1 December)

2015

- The Confidant (9 February)
- Friendly Fire (4 May)
- Slow Boat Home (1 July)
- Triumph in the Skies II (1 September)
- Bounty Lady (15 December)

2016

- Sniper Standoff (1 February)
- Storm in a Cocoon (11 April)
- Ruse of Engagement (22 June)
- Come On, Cousin (22 August)
- Black Heart White Soul (31 October)

2017

- Rear Mirror (9 January)
- Line Walker (27 February)
- Lord of Shanghai (9 May)
- Romantic Repertoire (24 July)
- The Executioner (11 September)
- The Fixer (13 November)
- Momentary Lapse of Reason (27 December)

2018

- Speed of Life (13 February)
- My Dangerous Mafia Retirement Plan (2 April)

=== TVB Classic drama series ===
Airing date	Title (production year)	Cast
7 April 1998	A House Is Not A Home (1980)	Chow Yun-fat, Ray Lui, Angie Chiu, Lau Dan
3 May 2012	The Bund (1980)	Chow Yun-fat, Ray Lui, Angie Chiu, Lau Dan
3 June 2012	Police Cadet '84 (1984)	Tony Leung, Maggie Cheung, Carina Lau
3 August 2012	File of Justice (1992)	Bobby Au Yeung, Amy Chan, Michael Tao, Lau Mei-Koon, William So

=== ATV ===
- The Good Old Days (1996) (Still running; Previously aired in 2009) (Also in 1998 by ntv7's sister channel TV3)
- I Have A Date With Spring (2009, 2011)
- Lady Stealer (2002) (Since 22 August 2011, weekdays from 2:30 pm)
- Love in a Miracle (Stars the protagonists of The Good Old Days, weekdays at 2:30 pm)

== Local drama series ==
=== Chinese ===
Year	Title	Cast	Producers
2003–2004	Homecoming		Double Vision
2006	The Beginning	Felicia Chin, Rynn Lim, Shaun Chen	MediaCorp, ntv7
2006	Falling in Love	Eunice Ng, William San, Zhang Yaodong	MediaCorp, ntv7
2007	Man of the House	Li Wenhai, Jess Teong, Wang Yuqing, Alan Tern	MediaCorp, ntv7
2007	The Beautiful Scent	William San, Dawn Yeoh, Cai Peixuan	MediaCorp, ntv7
2007	Fallen Angel	Shaun Chen, Zzen Zhang, Cai Peixuan, Tiffany Leong	MediaCorp, ntv7
2007	Love Is All Around	Apple Hong, Wee Kheng Ming, Zhu Mimi, William San, Eunice Ng	MediaCorp, ntv7
2008	Where The Heart Is	Priscelia Chan, Zhang Yaodong, Tong Xin	MediaCorp, ntv7
2008	Age of Glory	Debbie Goh, Frederick Lee, Aenie Wong	Double Vision, ntv7
2008	Exclusive	Berg Lee, Yise Loo	Double Vision, ntv7
2008	Her Many Faces	Cynthia Koh, Cai Peixuan, Alan Tern	MediaCorp, ntv7
2008	The Thin Line	Zzen Zhang, Duncan, Jane Ng, Tracy Lee	MediaCorp, ntv7
2008	Addicted To Love	Eunice Ng, Brenda Chiah, Phyllis Quek, Ong Ai Leng	MediaCorp, ntv7
2009	Lion.Hearts	Berg Lee, Cai Peixuan	MediaCorp, ntv7
2009	The Iron Lady	Yeo Yann Yann, Aenie Wong	Double Vision, ntv7
2009	Welcome Home, My Love	Apple Hong, Adam Chen, Tiffany Leong, Chris Tong	MediaCorp, ntv7
2009	Romantic Delicacies	Melvin Sia, Jesseca Liu	MediaCorp, ntv7
2009	My Kampong Days	Wee Kheng Ming, Zzen Zhang, Emily Lim	MediaCorp, ntv7
2009	My Destiny	Hishiko Woo, Tiffany Leong, Johnson Lee	MediaCorp, ntv7
2009	Timeless Season	Eunice Ng, Kirby Chan, Steve Yap	Double Vision, ntv7
2010	Friends Forever	Julian Hee, Tracy Lee, Melvin Sia	MediaCorp, ntv7
2010	Glowing Embers	Debbie Goh, Frederick Lee	Double Vision, ntv7
2010	The Glittering Days	Felicia Chin, William San, Chris Tong	MediaCorp, ntv7
2010	Age of Glory 2	Debbie Goh, Aenie Wong, Frederick Lee, Elvis Chin	Double Vision, ntv7
2010	Injustice	Tiffany Leong, William San, Chris Tong, Zzen Zhang	MediaCorp, ntv7
2010	Mystique Valley	Jess Teong, Elvis Chin, Aenie Wong, Hishiko Woo	Double Vision, ntv7
2010	Tribulations of Life	William San, Tiffany Leong, Melvin Sia, Brenda Chiah, Wymen Yang, Koh Yah Hwee	MediaCorp, ntv7
2011	The Seeds of Life	Melvin Sia, Shaun Chen, Eelyn Kok	MediaCorp, ntv7
2011	Footprints in the Sand		Double Vision, ntv7
2011	Destiny in Her Hands	Jeanette Aw, Steve Yap	MediaCorp, ntv7
2011	Forget Me Not		Double Vision, ntv7
2011	Kampong Ties	Yvonne Lim, Ann Kok, Zhang Ge Ping	MediaCorp
2011	Dark Sunset		MediaCorp, ntv7

- The Liar (30 September 2013)
- Persona
- The Injustice Stranger
- Superhero at Home (20 May 2013)
- Pianissimo (18 December 2013)
- The Undercover (3 July 2013)
- In-Laws (20 February 2013)
- Radio Rhapsody (28 October 2013)
- Laws of Attraction (3 April 2012)
- Summer Brothers
- Justice In The City (10 September 2012)
- Mining Magnate (31 October 2012)
- Teen Edge (10 February 2014)
- Dreaming of Sunshine (11 September 2012, airs every Monday to Friday, 6pm)
- Without You (9 May 2014, airs every Friday, 9:30pm)
- In-Laws 2 (20 May 2014)
- On The Brink
- Daddy Dearest (26 August 2014)
- The Scavenger (8 October 2014)
- Pulse Of Life (15 February 2016)
- Oppa Oppa (6 April 2016)
- On The Brink II (11 May 2016)
- Malaysian Alice In The Wonderland (4 July 2016)
- Beautiful World (15 July 2016)
- Mind Game
- Secret Lover (20 September 2016)
- Star Avenue (20 December 2016)
- My Twins Lovers (22 December 2016)
- Revolving Heart (14 February 2017)
- I Am Not A Loser (6 April 2017)
- The Memoir Of Majie (20 July 2017)
- The Men in Black School (12 September 2017)
- Away From Home (2015)

=== Malay ===
- Dari KL Ke Queenstown (Seasons 1 & 2)
- Elly (Seasons 1 & 2)
- Nafas
- Cik Shopaholic
- Dapur Kongsi
- Vlog Laura
- GIG
- Pontianak Teng Teng
- Idola Kecil Pengembaraan Ben
- Cruise Cinta Lebaran
- Kelab Komedi Ekstra
- Inai Yang Hilang
- 5 Jingga
- Cinta Koko Coklat
- Formula Cinta
- Budak Boys
- #BudakIntern
- Budak Usin
- Tanah Merah
- Juvana
- Budak Magik
- Budak Tebing (Musim 1-3)
- Misi Anak Bulan
- Runi & Solah
- Diari Ramadan Rafique Reunion
- Hawt Fellas
- Kami Budak Band
- Diva Seroja

Hybrid

- Crossings (English and Malay)
- Ghost (English and Malay)
- Blogger Boy (English and Malay)

=== Indonesia ===
- Bukan Cinderella
- Bukan Diriku
- Dara Manisku
- Demi Cinta
- Liontin

== Local sitcoms ==
Malay

- Hartamas
- Spanar Jaya (Seasons 1–10)
- Gol & Gincu The Series (Rerun of former 8TV programme)
- Pesan Makan

Chinese

- Love Compulsory (Seasons 1-4)
- Mr. Siao's Mandarin Class (Seasons 1 & 2)
- Time FM
- The Easy Path

English

- Kopitiam
- Phua Chu Kang Sdn Bhd
- Show Me The Money
- Small Mission Enterprise

== Festive special ==
Puasa

- Ramadan Sana Sini
- Reality Ramadan Mike
- Wish List Raya
- Meh Raya Meh
- I Heart Kurma
- Syawal Mencari Cinta
- Family Showdown Raya
- Kasi Gegar Raya
- Istanbul Aku Datang
- The Sarimah Show Raya

Chinese New Year

- Into The Phoenix

== Fitness programme ==
- Fit and Fab
- Fitness First Class

== Singaporean TV series ==
English

- The Kitchen Musical
- Mata-Mata
- Living with Lydia
- Parental Guidance
- Maggi & Me
- Phua Chu Kang (also aired on TV3)
- Under One Roof (also aired on TV3 and 8TV)

Chinese

- The Champion
- The Oath
- Tiger Mom (TV series)
- A Tale of 2 Cities
- Break Free
- The Dream Job

=== Drama ===
Year	Title	Main cast	Descriptions	Producer(s)
12 October 2009	The Golden Path 黄金路	Li Nan Xing, Chen Liping, Tay Ping Hui, Felicia Chin, Joanne Peh, Chew Chor Meng, Yang Xinquan, Nat Ho, Joey Fung, Wen Liling, Wang Yuqing, Li Wenhai, Edmund Chen, Joey Swee, Cai Pei Xuan, Huang Wenyong, Priscelia Chan, Huang Yiliang		MediaCorp Channel 8 2007
23 November 2009	The Little Nyonya 小娘惹	Jeanette Aw, Joanne Peh, Qi Yu Wu, Yao Wen Long, Pierre Png, Pan Ling Ling, Cynthia Koh, Apple Hong, Darren Lim, Zzen Zhang, Andie Chen, Eelyn Kok, Dai Yang Tian, Lin Mei Jiao, Xiang Yun, Ng Hui, Felicia Chin, Nat Ho, Julian Hee		MediaCorp Channel 8 2008
8 January 2010	Housewives' Holiday 煮妇的假期	Ann Kok, Hong Hui Fang, Xiang Yun, Brandon Wong, Yao Wen Long, Rayson Tan		MediaCorp Channel 8 2009
5 February 2010	The Homecoming 十三鞭	Li Nanxing, Rayson Tan, Zheng Geping, Brandon Wong, Constance Song, Vivian Lai, Ye Shipin, Ong Ai Leng		MediaCorp Channel 8 2007
5 March 2010	Crime Busters x 2 叮当神探	Tay Ping Hui, Dawn Yeoh, Shaun Chen, Paige Chua, Jackson Tan, Zhang Yaodong, Huang Wenyong, Hong Huifang, Richard Low, Mariana, Bryan Chan, Joey Swee, Nick Shen, Pan Lingling, Jerry Yeo, Jesseca Liu, Celest Chong		MediaCorp Channel 8 2008
2 April 2010	Rhythm of Life 变奏曲	Christopher Lee, Elvin Ng, Zzen Zhang, Jesseca Liu, Jeanette Aw, Dawn Yeoh, Julian Hee, Li Yinzhu		MediaCorp Channel 8 2008
30 April 2010	Housewives' Holiday 煮妇的假期	Ann Kok, Hong Hui Fang, Xiang Yun, Brandon Wong, Yao Wen Long, Rayson Tan	Encore telecast	MediaCorp Channel 8 2009
28 May 2010	The Homecoming 十三鞭	Li Nanxing, Rayson Tan, Zheng Geping, Brandon Wong, Constance Song, Vivian Lai, Ye Shipin, Ong Ai Leng	Encore telecast	MediaCorp Channel 8 2007
25 June 2010	Crime Busters x 2 叮当神探	Tay Ping Hui, Dawn Yeoh, Shaun Chen, Paige Chua, Jackson Tan, Zhang Yaodong, Huang Wenyong, Hong Huifang, Richard Low, Mariana, Bryan Chan, Joey Swee, Nick Shen, Pan Lingling, Jerry Yeo, Jesseca Liu, Celest Chong	Encore telecast	MediaCorp Channel 8 2008
23 July 2010	The Truth 谜图	Tay Ping Hui, Joanne Peh, Shaun Chen, Rebecca Lim, Zhu Hou Ren, Richard Low, Zhu Yuye		MediaCorp Channel 8 2008
20 August 2010	Perfect Cut Season 1 一切完美	Michelle Chia, Thomas Ong		MDA 2008
8 September 2010	My School Daze 书包太重	Rui En, Chen Han Wei, Ann Kok, Cynthia Koh, Terence Cao		MediaCorp Channel 8 2009
6 October 2010	My Buddy 难兄烂弟	Christopher Lee, Zheng Geping, Ng Hui, Carole Lin		MediaCorp Channel 8 2009
5 October 2010	Unriddle Season 1 最火搭档1	Rui En, Chen Liping, Tay Ping Hui, Andie Chen, Joshua Ang, Xiang Yun, Zhou Ying, Rayson Tan, Zheng Geping, Paige Chua, Wang Yuqing, Brandon Wong, Shaun Chen, Zzen Zhang, Priscelia Chan, Chen Tian Wen, Ong Ai Leng, Lin Meijiao, Zhu Houren, Wee Kheng Ming	10:00 pm primetime slot, first and exclusive	MediaCorp Channel 8 2010
3 November 2010	Daddy at Home 企鹅爸爸	Chen Han Wei, Li Nan Xing, Ann Kok, Cynthia Koh, Adam Chen, Dawn Yeoh		MediaCorp Channel 8 2009
1 December 2010	Baby Bonus 添丁发财	Felicia Chin, Tay Ping Hui, Jesseca Liu, Xiang Yun, Darren Lim, Apple Hong, Terence Cao, Jerry Yeo, Lin Mei Jiao, Zhu Hou Ren, Beatrice Looi		MediaCorp Channel 8 2009
3 January 2011	Reunion Dinner 团圆饭	Chen Han Wei, Chen Li Ping, Patricia Mok, Zhu Hou Ren, Wang Yuqing, Xu Ya Hui, Kym Ng, Alan Tern		MediaCorp Channel 8 2009
31 January 2011	Together 当我们同在一起	Dai Yang Tian, Jeanette Aw, Elvin Ng, Zhou Ying, Eelyn Kok, Zhang Zhenhuan, Hong Hui Fang, Ye Shipin, Aileen Tan, Zheng Geping, Li Wenhai, Wang Yuqing, Constance Song, Nat Ho, Pamelyn Chee, Desmond Tan		MediaCorp Channel 8 2009
22 March 2011	Happy Family 过好年	Rui En, Remus Kam, Chen Shu Cheng, Ann Kok, Cynthia Koh, Darren Lim, Chen Tian Wen, Pan Ling Ling, Shaun Chen, Xu Ya Hui, Alan Tern, Marcus Chin, Henry Thia		MediaCorp Channel 8 2010
19 April 2011	Perfect Cut Season 2 一切完美2	Michelle Chia, Thomas Ong, Edmund Chen		MDA 2009
6 May 2011	New Beginnings 红白囍事	Tay Ping Hui, Jesseca Liu, Elvin Ng, Jeanette Aw, Joshua Ang, Tracy Tan, Zhang Zhenhuan, Lin Mei Jiao, Priscelia Chan, Chen Tian Wen, Yao Wen Long, Ix Shen, Richard Low, Hong Hui Fang, Icaru Yuan		MediaCorp Channel 8 2010
6 June 2011	Precious Babes; 3个女人一个宝	Ann Kok, Cynthia Koh, Eelyn Kok, Qi Yuwu, Zheng Geping, Alan Tern		MediaCorp Channel 8 2010
23 May 2012	A Tale of 2 Cities 乐在双城	Rui En, Pierre Png, Joanne Peh, Zhang Yao Dong, Zhang Zhenhuan, Julie Tan, Kate Pang, Yao Wen Long, Zhu Mi Mi, Ho Kwai Lam, Xu Ya Hui, Jerry Yeo, Constance Song, Xiang Yun, Huang Wen Yong, Darren Lim	6:00 pm primetime slot, first and exclusive; this drama is shot in some parts of Kuala Lumpur; it is not a collaboration with Ntv7	MediaCorp Channel 8 2012
16 May 2012	Unriddle Season 2 最火搭档2	Rui En, Chen Liping, Tay Ping Hui, Elvin Ng, Rebecca Lim, Yuan Shuai, Adam Chen, Xiang Yun, Zhou Ying, Joshua Ang, Romeo Tan, Julie Tan, Sora Ma, Adeline Lim, Brandon Wong, Lin Meijiao, Chen Tianwen, Desmond Shen, Wang Yuqing, Bernard Tan, Zhang Wei, Ng Hui, Chen Tian Wen, Huang Qiming	10:00 pm (now at 9:30 pm) primetime slot, first and exclusive	MediaCorp Channel 8 2012
5 January 2016	118		MediaCorp, ntv7	
5 January 2016	2015	C.L.I.F. 3		MediaCorp, ntv7

- If Only I Could (TV series) (16 August 2016)
- C.L.I.F. 4
- Hero (2017)
- Home Truly (2018)

== Latin America ==
=== Telenovela ===
Year	Title	Cast	Notes	Production company
2000	Maria Mercedes 1992	Thalía, Arturo Peniche	First telenovela shown in Malaysia	Televisa
2001	La usurpadora 1998	Gabriela Spanic, Fernando Colunga	And Mas Alla de La Usurpadora	Televisa
2002 _{Repeat: 2004, 2010}	Mis 3 Hermanas	Ricardo Alamo, Scarlet Ortiz, Roberto Moll		RCTV 2000
2002	Yo soy Betty, la fea	Jorge Enrique Abello, Ana Maria Orozco, Estefania Gomez		RCN TV 1999
2003	La Niña de Mis Ojos	Simon Pestana, Lilibeth Morillo, Natalia Striegnard, Juan Pablo Raba		RCTV 2001
2003	La duda	Silvia Navarro, Omar Germenos, Victor Gonzalez Reynoso		TV Azteca 2002
2003	Secreto de Amor	Scarlet Ortiz, Jorge Aravena, Jorge Luis Pila		Venevision 2001
2003	La Costeña y El Cachaco	Jorge Enrique Abello, Amada Rosa Perez, Geraldine Zivic, Indhira Serrano		RCN TV 2003
2003	Juana la virgen	Ricardo Alamo, Daniela Alvarado, Eduardo Serrano		RCTV 2002
2004	Mi Gorda Bella	Juan Pablo Raba, Natalia Striegnard		RCTV 2002
2004	¡Anita, no te rajes!	Jorge Enrique Abello, Ivonne Montero, Natalia Striegnard, Cristian Tappan, Elluz Peraza, Eduardo Serrano, Jorge Alberti		Telemundo 2005
_{Repeat: 2006}	La Hija del Jardinero	Mariana Ochoa, Carlos Torres	Formerly aired on TV3	TV Azteca 2003
2006	Olvidarte Jamas	Sonya Smith, Gabriel Porras, Mariana Torres, William Levy, Elizabeth Gutierrez		Venevision 2005
2007	Rebeca	Ricardo Alamo, Mariana Soane, Jorge Luis Pila, Gaby Espino, Pablo Montero, Victor Camara, Elluz Peraza, Ana Patricia Rojo, Katie Barberi, Susana Dosamantes		Venevision 2003
2008	Montecristo	Silvia Navarro, Omar Germenos, Diego Olivera		TV Azteca 2006
2016	Soy Luna	Karol Sevilla, Ruggero Pasquarelli, Valentina Zenere	In spanish with English Subtitles. Also airs on TV2 (dubbed in Malay with English Subtitles), TV3 and TV9 (dubbed in English with Malay Subtitles)	Disney Channel Latin America 2016

== Taiwan TV series ==
=== Hokkien Drama series ===
Year	Title	Cast	Production company
2007	Desire For life 慾望人生		Formosa Television 2004
2008	Unforgettable Love 不了情		Formosa Television 2002
2008	Butterfly Story		Formosa Television 1998
2009	Mother, Please Don't Leave!		Formosa Television 1997
2007	Desire for Life 慾望人生	Encore telecast	Formosa Television 2004
2008	Unforgettable Love 不了情	Encore telecast	Formosa Television 2002
2008	Butterfly Story	Encore telecast	Formosa Television 1998
2009	Mother, Please Don't Leave!	Encore telecast	Formosa Television 1997
2008–2009	Fiery Thunderbolt 台湾霹雳火		SET TV 2005
2009– May 2010	Strokes of Life 金枝玉叶		Formosa Television 2001
15 February 2010 – 19 April 2011	I Must Succeed 我一定要成功		SET TV 2007–2008
2010	Woman of Steel		Formosa Television 2000
2011	Point of No Return		Formosa Television 2003
20 April 2011	Taiwan Tornado 台湾龙卷风		SET TV 2004 – 2005

Idol drama

- My Fair Princess (2009)
- It Started with a Kiss (July 2011)
- Corner With Love (11 August 2011)
- Monga Yao Hui (15 August 2011)

Taiwan Variety show

- King of the Show

== Variety show ==
English

- A to Z
- Best in The World (Repeat on 1 November 2020) (Every Sunday from 8:00 pm to 8:30 pm) (Multiple Season)
- Splatalot!
- Fuzz Food
- Mad Markets
- The Disko Baldi Show
- Hip Hoppin Asia (Repeat of former 8TV programme)
- Kan Cheong Kitchen (Repeat of former 8TV programme)
- Japanizi: Going, Going, Gong!
- Just for Laughs Gags
- Oprah's Big Give
- Little Big Shots
- America's Funniest Home Videos
- The Amazing Race
- Life's Funniest Moments
- Deal or No Deal Malaysia
- Fear Factor Malaysia
- The Firm
- Go Travel (Also aired on TV9 and Awesome TV) (Formerly in TV2)
- Sounds of Muslims
- Eco Traveller
- Supper Heroes
- Fly TV 2018
- Thursday Night Live
- Take me out Malaysia
- Fort Boyard (TV series)
- Pop Rumble
- Bella
- Off The Hook
- Rooftop

Hybrid

- Taste of Malaysia Martin Yan (English and Chinese)

Malay

- Kail X (5 January 2021) (Every Tuesday 9:00 pm to 9:30 pm) (Reality Television)
- Switch Off
- Fuzz Food
- Skuad Pasar Malam
- Festival Jurnal Kembara Dunia
- Seekers
- Pop! TV (formerly in TV9)
- Feel Good Show
- It's Alif!
- Drop The Beat (Originally planned for broadcast on TV3)
- I Can See Your Voice Malaysia (Originally planned for broadcast on TV3)
- Edisi Siasat
- Wakenabeb
- Rojak
- Selera Sado
- Bila Bujang Masuk Dapur
- The Sherry Show
- The Streets
- Apa Nak Makan Ni
- Kata Serasi?
- Roda Impian
- Actorlympics TV
- NTV7 special
- Destinasi G4
- Makan Angin
- Lari Kita Kejar Dia
- Lari 2015
- Ke Indonesia Ke Kita?
- Ke Jepun Ke Kita?
- Woot Woot 2013
- Bang Bang Boom

Mandarin

- My Man Can
- If You Are the One (game show)
- Mandarin Battle Star (2010–2016) (Chinese Primary school students quiz show sponsored by Besta and later Vitagen)
- e7
- Project CSR
- Hey! Shoot Out! (Saturday night and show time)
- Variety Get Together
- Unsolved Mysterious
- Edition Investigate Mandarin (Chinese version of Edisi Siasat)
- Star Idol Malaysia
- Foodie Blogger
- Helping Hands (Sponsored by sports toto)
- Finding Angel
- Aunty Must Go Crazy
- Yummy Trail
- Women's Zone
- Super Smart (Chinese High school students quiz show) (Reality Television)
- Deal or No Deal Malaysia Chinese
- Global Watch (Moved to 8TV due to rebrand)
- Battle of the Best Singapore
- Wo Men San
- Kids Ask Big Questions
- Mars vs Venus
- All About Sports
- Feel Good Feel Cook
- Project Sunshine
- Guess Who
- 7 Zoom In
- Chong Feng Zhen Xian
- Heart Talk
- Editor's Time

Korean

- Produce 101 (formerly in TV9)
- Running Man (also aired on TV2) and (formerly in TV9)
- I Can See Your Voice Korea (formerly in TV9)

== Talk show ==
- NTV7 Breakfast Show (Monday to Friday from 8:00 am to 10:00 am)

2018

- Feel Good Show. Discontinued in 2019 due to CJ WOW SHOP airtime on NTV7, final episode aired on 28 December 2018. (Daily, 8:00 am before it changed to Mon - Fri, 9:00 am)
- Viewpoint (2018 Malaysian general election special) (Special programmes regarding Malaysia 14th general election)

2021

- Breakfast@9pm 2021 (January) (Monday 9:00 pm to 9:30 pm)
- Money Matters (January) (Exact date: Unknown) (Friday 9:00 pm to 9:30 pm) (Repeated programme from TV3) (also on TV3)
- Soal Drama (2 January) (Tuesday, 9:00 pm to 9:30 pm)
- Topik@7 (2 January) (Saturday 9:00 pm to 9:30 pm)
- Edisi Siasat (3 January) (Sunday 9:00 pm to 9:30 pm)
- T.O.P (Trio On Point) (4 January) (Monday to Wednesday 6:00 pm to 7:00 pm)

== Reality show ==
English

- Top 20 Countdown: Most Shocking

== News ==
=== Now ===
- Buletin Didik (Daily) (Daily from 7:00 pm to 7:30 pm daily). It resumes broadcast on 1 October 2024, after a year of hiatus. Repeat on the next day from 1:30 pm to 2:00 pm before changed to 1:00 pm on 1 December 2025.

=== Formerly ===
• Buletin 1:30 (Malay) (Saturdays to Thursdays from 1:30 pm to 2:00 pm)(Live simultaneous broadcast on TV3). Replaced by Buletin Didik repeat on 2 October 2024. It was aired with NTV7 logo until 30 September.

• Buletin Pagi (Malay) (Fridays from 1:30 pm to 2:00 pm) This newscast is the first newscast to air every Friday. Most of the news revolves around events and issues or news that have happened in the current day. (Repeat from TV3).

- 7 Edition (English) (Daily from 8:00 pm to 9:00 pm) (Effective 1 December 2020, broadcasting timeslot change to 8:00 pm to 9:00 pm, instead of previous broadcast timeslot which is from 8:00 pm to 8:30 pm) (Ended on 17 February 2021)
- Edisi 7 (Malay) (Daily from 7:30 pm to 8:00 pm) (Effective in December 2020, broadcasting timeslot change to 12:00 pm to 12:30 pm, instead of previous broadcast timeslot which is from 7:30 pm to 8:00 pm.) (Ended on 17 February 2021, replaced by Buletin Didik broadcasting daily from 7:30 pm to 8:00 pm)
- Mandarin 7 (Chinese) (Daily from 5:00 pm to 6:00 pm) (Ended on 8 June 2020, merged with 8TV Mandarin News)
- 7 Nightly News (English) (Ended on the 2000s,merged with 7 Edition)

== Turkish ==
- New Bride - Yeni Gelin
- Brave and Beautiful - Cesur ve Güzel

== British ==
- Mr. Bean

== Korean drama ==
=== Dubbed in Mandarin ===
Date	Title	Cast	Production company
Airing from 1998 to 2007. Every weekday at 9:00 pm, later 9:30 pm
2005	Lovers in Paris	Kim Jung-eun, Park Shin-yang	SBS 2004
2007	Hwang Jin Yi	Ha Ji Won, Kim Jae Won	KBS 2006

=== Original language ===
Date	Title	Cast	Production company
December 2010	Stairway to Heaven	Choi Ji-woo, Kwon Sang-woo, Kim Tae-hee, and Shin Hyun Joon	SBS 2003–2004
26 January 2011	Full House	Song Hye-kyo, Rain	KBS 2004
February 2011	All About Eve	Chae Rim, Jang Dong Gun, Han Jae Suk	MBC 2000
March 2011	Oh Feel Young	An Jae-uk, Bak Chae-rim, Ryu Jin	KBS 2004
April 2011	Hotelier	Bae Yong Joon, Song Yun-ah	MBC 2001
May 2011	Coffee Prince	Yoon Eun Hye, Gong Yoo	MBC 2007
July 2011	Princess Hours	Yoon Eun Hye, Joo Ji Hoon	MBC 2006
August 2011	Witch Yoo Hee	Han Ga In, Jae Hee	SBS 2007
29 February 2012	Becoming a Billionaire	Ji Hyun-woo, Lee Bo-young	KBS 2010
11 April 2012	Sassy Girl Chun-hyang	Han Chae Young, Jae Hee	KBS 2005
14 June 2012	Hello! Miss	Lee Da-hae, Lee Ji-hoon	KBS 2007
15 May 2012	My Girl	Lee Da-hae, Lee Dong-wook	SBS 2005
16 July 2012	Cool Guys, Hot Ramen	Jung Il-woo, Lee Chung-ah	tvN 2011
7 August 2012	Baby Faced Beauty	Jang Na-ra, Choi Daniel	KBS 2011
31 December 2012	Love Story in Harvard	Kim Rae-won, Kim Tae-hee	SBS 2004
1 February 2013	Still, Marry Me	Park Jin-hee, Uhm Ji-won, Wang Bit-na	MBC 2010
9 April 2013	Birdie Buddy	Uee, Lee Yong-woo, Lee Da-hee	tvN 2011
16 July 2013	Oh! My Lady	Chae Rim, Choi Siwon	SBS 2010
23 October 2013	Sungkyunkwan Scandal	Park Min-young, Park Yuchun, Yoo Ah-in, Song Joong-ki	KBS 2010
2 December 2013	My Girlfriend Is a Gumiho	Lee Seung-gi and Shin Min-ah	SBS 2010
2 January 2014	My Princess	Kim Tae-hee, Song Seung-hun	MBC 2011
5 February 2014	A Gentleman's Dignity	Jang Dong-gun, Kim Ha-neul	SBS 2012
3 June 2014	Secret Garden	Ha Ji-won, Hyun Bin	SBS 2010
10 July 2014	The Greatest Love	Cha Seung-won, Gong Hyo-jin	MBC 2011
12 August 2014	Boys Over Flowers	Ku Hye-sun, Lee Min-ho	KBS 2009
1 October 2014	Heartstrings	Park Shin-hye, Jung Yong-hwa	MBC 2011
30 October 2014	The Great Doctor	Lee Min-ho, Kim Hee-sun	SBS 2012
20 January 2015	Personal Taste	Lee Min-ho, Son Ye-jin	MBC 2010
24 March 2015	Time Slip Dr. Jin	Song Seung-heon, Park Min-young	MBC 2012
22 June 2015	Kang Chi The Beginning	Lee Seung-gi and Suzy	MBC 2013
12 August 2015	Arang and the Magistrate	Lee Joon-gi, Shin Min-ah	MBC 2012
1 April 2013	A Gentleman's Dignity	Jang Dong-gun, Kim Ha-neul	SBS 2012
20 October 2014	My Girlfriend Is a Gumiho	Lee Seung-gi and Shin Min-ah	SBS 2010
29 June 2015	Secret Garden	Ha Ji-won, Hyun Bin	SBS 2010

- A Girl Who Sees Smells - 5 March 2018
- Hogu's Love - 5 April 2018
- The Doctors - 10 May 2018
- Suits - 16 May 2018
- The Bride of Habaek - 20 June 2018
- The Liar and His Lover - 27 July 2018
- Because This Is My First Life - 31 August 2018

== Mainland Chinese ==
- Journey to the West (2011 TV series)
- Pretty Li Hui Zhen
- City Still Believe In Love
- Love Actually

== Children's programmes ==
- Alice's Wonderland Bakery (Bahasa Malaysia dubbed)
- Rabbids Invasion
- Crayon Shinchan
- CJ The DJ (also aired on TV2)
- Doraemon
- Regal Academy
- Paw Patrol
- Shimmer and Shine (moves to TV3 and also aired on TV2)
- Dora the Explorer (moves to TV3)
- Kamen Rider Series
  - Kamen Rider Ryuki
  - Kamen Rider Faiz
  - Kamen Rider Blade
  - Kamen Rider Hibiki
  - Kamen Rider Kabuto
  - Kamen Rider Den-O
  - Kamen Rider Kiva
  - Kamen Rider Decade
  - Kamen Rider W
  - Kamen Rider OOO
  - Kamen Rider Fourze
- Power Rangers
  - Power Rangers Jungle Fury
  - Power Rangers RPM
  - Power Rangers Samurai
  - Power Rangers Super Samurai
  - Power Rangers Megaforce
  - Power Rangers Dino Charge
  - Power Rangers Dino Supercharge
- Super Sentai
  - Tensou Sentai Goseiger
  - Zyuden Sentai Kyoryuger (moved to TV3 during rerun at 31 December 2018)
- Batman of the Future (moved to TV9)
- Blaze and the Monster Machines
- Hi-5 (moved to Astro TVIQ & Disney Junior Asia)
- BoBoiBoy
- Oggy and the Cockroaches (moved to Awesome TV)
- Pocket Dragon Adventures
- Transformers: Prime
- My Little Pony: Friendship Is Magic
- Mr. Bean: The Animated Series (moved to Awesome TV)
- Horrivle Stories
- My Life Me
- Ultraman
  - Ultraman Tiga
  - Ultraman Dyna
  - Ultraman Gaia
  - Ultraman Neos
  - Ultraman Cosmos
- Upin & Ipin
- Yo Gabba Gabba!
- Kappa Mikey (Formerly aired on TV9)
- El Tigre: The Adventures of Manny Rivera
- SpongeBob SquarePants
- Phineas and Ferb
- Johnny Test
- The Amazing World of Gumball
- Iron Man: Armored Adventures
- Justice League (TV series)
- Lego series
  - Lego Friends - Girls on A Mission
  - Lego Ninjago (Bahasa Malaysia dubbed)
  - Lego Monkie Kid: a Hero Is Born (also aired on TV3 & 8TV) (Chinese dubbed)
- Leo the Wildlife Ranger
- Loonatics Unleashed
- OOglies
- Ollie and Friends
- Samurai Jack
- Superman: The Animated Series (moved to TV9)
- The Powerpuff Girls (moved to RTM2)
- Spider-Man: The Animated Series
- Spider-Man Unlimited
- The Spectacular Spider-Man
- X-Men: The Animated Series
- X-Men: Evolution
- Wolverine and the X-Men
- Xiaolin Showdown

=== Anime ===
NTV7 airing to Anime dubbed in Bahasa Malaysia / English / Cantonese / Mandarin / Japanese with Bahasa Malaysia / Chinese subtitles if available.

- Rurouni Kenshin
- Kaleido Star
- Slam Dunk
- Sailor Moon
  - Sailor Moon R
- Sonic X
- Trinity Blood
- Kekkaishi
- You're Under Arrest
- The Melancholy of Haruhi Suzumiya
- K-On!
- Love Live!
- Doraemon
- Sailor Moon Crystal (moved to TA-DAA!)
- Naruto
- Dr. Rin!
- Dragon Ball Z Kai
- Naruto Shippuden
- Attack on Titan
- Captain Tsubasa: Road to 2002
- Accel World
- Maid-Sama
- Marvel Anime
  - Iron Man
  - Wolverine
  - X-Men
  - Blade
- Yu-Gi-Oh!
  - Yu-Gi-Oh! Duel Monsters
  - Yu-Gi-Oh! GX
  - Yu-Gi-Oh! 5D's
  - Yu-Gi-Oh! Zexal
  - Yu-Gi-Oh! Arc-V
  - Yu-Gi-Oh! VRAINS
- One Piece
- Dragon Ball Super
- Spy × Family
- Majin Bone (also aired on Toonami Asia) (English dubbed)
- Super Yo-Yo
- Tsubasa Chronicles
- Digimon Adventure
- Dinosaur King
- Pokémon
- Fairy Tail (Season 1)
- Keroro Gunsou
- Inazuma Eleven
- Yokai Watch
- Sword Art Online
- Battle B-Daman
- UFO baby
- Medabots
- Get Backers
- Chibi Maruko Chan
- Fruits Basket
- Shaman King
- The Prince of Tennis
- School Rumble
- Petite Princess Yucie
- Kasumin
- Mobile Suit Gundam 00
- Angelic Layer
- Basilisk
- Cardcaptor Sakura
- Fate/Stay Night
- Fullmetal Alchemist: Brotherhood
- Mobile Suit Gundam AGE
- Hamtaro
- Inuyasha
- Digimon Xros Wars
- Jigoku Shoujo
- Jubei Chan
- Mahou Sensei Negima!
- Magical Girl Lyrical Nanoha
- Magical Girl Lyrical Nanoha A's
- Magical Girl Lyrical Nanoha StrikerS
- Mamotte Shugogetten
- Mushrambo
- Powerpuff Girls Z
- Pretty Cure
- Pretty Rhythm
- PriPara
- Ragnarok The Animation
- Shakugan no Shana
- Tokyo Revengers (Coming Soon in Early 2025) (Mandarin dub, Season 1 only and original Japanese dub, Season 2 - present)

== Award shows ==
=== 2010 ===
- Golden Awards (also in 2012, 2014, 2017)
- 62nd Primetime Emmy Awards
- 67th Golden Globe Awards

== Sports ==
- 2014 Commonwealth Games (with TV3)
