= List of programmes broadcast by Mediacorp Channel 8 =

This is a list of Chinese-language television programme broadcast on Mediacorp Channel 8, a television channel in Singapore.

The years stated in the list are the years in which the programmes were first aired on the channel.

== Current programming ==
=== News ===
- News 8 At One [1点新闻] (weekdays at 1pm)
- Hello Singapore – 狮城有约 (weekdays from 6:30pm to 7:30pm)
  - Talk of the Town (weekdays 9am)
- News Tonight – 晚间新闻 (all days from 10pm to 10:30pm) (also broadcast on Mediacorp Channel U at 11pm on all days)
- Singapore Today – 狮城6点半 (weekends only from 6:30pm)
- 60s News in Brief (weekdays at 11am, 3pm and 5pm & weekends at 5pm)

=== Current affairs ===
- Tuesday Report – 星期二特写 (Tuesday evenings starting at 8:30pm)
- Focus – 焦点 (every Thursday at 10:30pm)
- Frontline – 前线追踪 (Fridays: 8:30pm)

=== Infotainment ===
- Let's Talk About Health – 医聊大小事 (8pm on Fridays, except last Friday of the month)
- Crimewatch – 绳之以法 (shown only on every last Friday of the month from 8pm)

=== Dramas ===
==== Singapore ====
- Kid U Not - 孩是老的辣 (2026)
- Sealed with a Kiss – 吻我吧，住家男 (2015; re-run, 2026)
- The Blockbusters - 巨舞霸 (2024; re-run, 2026)

==== Hong Kong ====
- Kowloon My City - 我爱九龙城 (2026; 1 episode per day)
- Come Home Love: Lo and Behold — 愛·回家之開心速遞 (2023; 3 episodes per day)

==== Taiwanese/China ====
- Proud of You — 天之娇女 (2024)
- Taste of Life — 甘味人生 (2018; re-run, 2026)
- Golden City — 多情城市（2025）

=== Home shopping ===
- The Wonder Shop

=== Reality/Variety ===
- Lunar New Year's Eve Special Show (Annual programming)
- Star Awards (Annual programming)
- Star Search (Annual programming)
- Golden Age Talentime – 黄金年华之斗歌竞艺
- The Sheng Siong Show – 缤纷万千在昇菘

== Former programming ==
=== Current affairs ===
- Money Week – 财经追击
- World This Week – 世界一周

=== Children's shows ===
- Fun Lab – 疯狂实验室 (2012)
- See The World – 娃娃看天下 (2012)
- Think BIG – 我的小小发明 (2012)
- Today I Am – 下课追梦去 (2012)
- How To Train Your Future – 我的未来有未来 (2020)
- Diary of Amos Lee - 阿莫的日记 (2020)
- Power 5 – 非常一班 (2021)
- Future Girl – 看见未来的女孩 (2022)
- Hello Hooman – 我的网红汪星人 (2022)
- The Fantasy Adventures of Mu Mu – 木木奇幻之旅 (2022)
- Diary of Amos Lee S2 - 阿莫的日记 2 (2023)
- Hello Hooman S2 – 我的超级汪星人 (2024)

=== Drama ===
==== Action horror crime drama series ====
- Breakout – 破天网 (2010)
- The Challenge – 谁与争锋 (2001)
- Coup De Scorpion – 天蝎行动 (1999)
- Dark Angel – 黑天使 (2022)
- From the Courtroom – 法庭故事 (1999)
- Game Plan – 千方百计 (2012)
- Mind Game – 心迷 (2015)
- P.I. Blues – 乌龙档案 (1999)
- The Queen – 复仇女王 (2016)
- Sudden – 骤变 (2013)
- The Tax Files – 流金税月 (Millenium 2000)

==== Anthology series ====
- Chronicles Of Life – 我爱我家真情实录 (2004)
- Health Matters – 一切由慎开始 (2002)
- Health Matters 2 – 一切由慎开始2 (2003)

==== Army series ====
- Honour and Passion – 宝家卫国 (2007)
- The Recruit Diaries – 阿兵新传 (2013)
- When Duty Calls – 卫国先锋 (2017)
- When Duty Calls 2 – 卫国先锋2 (2022)

==== Biographical drama series ====
- Through Thick and Thin – 阿灿正传 (2001)

==== Comedy-drama series ====
- Absolutely Charming – 糊里糊涂爱上它 (2012)
- A Million Treasures – 百万宝 (2006)
- Brotherhood – 有情有义 (2002)
- Baby Boom – 我家四个宝
- Darling-In-Law – 我的岳母是巫婆 (1999)
- Double Bonus – 双星报喜 (2012)
- Four Walls and a Ceiling – 我爱黄金屋 (2000)
- Hello From The Other Side – 阴错阳差 (2019)
- Home in Toa Payoh – 家在大巴窑
- Housewives' Holiday – 煮妇的假期 (2009)
- Just in Singapore – 一房半厅一水缸 (2008)
- Leave No Soul Behind – 21点灵 (2021)
- Like Father, Like Daughter – 宝贝父女兵 (2007)
- Mrs P.I. – 查某人 (2010)
- My Agent Is A Hero 2 – 流氓经纪2 (2019)
- My One in a Million – 我的万里挑一 (2019)
- No Problem! – 考试家族 (2002)
- Oh Dad! – 偶像爸爸 (2004)
- Perfectly Imperfect — 活出好命来 (2025)
- Right Frequency – 播音人 (1998)
- Soul Detective – 灵探 (2022)
- Soul Doctor – 灵医 (2022)
- The Best Things In Life – 五福到 (2010)
- The Glittering Days – 星光灿烂 (2013)
- The Hotel – 大酒店 (2001)
- Yours Fatefully – 孤男寡女 (2012)

==== Docufiction drama series ====
- The Day It Rained on Our Parade – 那一年我们淋着雨 (2012)

==== Chinese New Year series ====
- 118 Reunion – 118 大团圆 (2018)
- Another Wok of Life – 人生酱美味 (2025)
- Double Happiness I and II – 喜临门 I 和 II (2004)
- Happy Family – 过好年 (2010)
- Home Again – 多年后的全家福 (2022)
- Home Truly – 回家 (2017)
- House of Fortune – 钱来运转 (2016)
- Once Upon A New Year's Eve - 那一年的除夕夜 (2024)
- Prosperity – 喜事年年 (2011)
- Reunion Dinner – 团圆饭 (2009)
- Strike Gold – 黄金巨塔 (2023)
- The Reunion – 顶天立地 (2001)

==== Drama series ====
- All That Glitters — 金色大道 (2023)
- Back to School — 摩登状元 (1999)
- Baby Blues – 谁家母鸡不生蛋 (2005)
- Be Happy – 生日快乐 (2011)
- Born To Shine — 孺子可教也(2024)
- Bright Future – 同一片蓝天 (1999)
- Cash on Delivery – 送餐英雄 (2023)
- Destiny – 梦在手里 (2005)
- Destiny In Her Hands – 断掌的女人 (2012)
- Fallen Angel – 天使的烙印 (2008)
- Fantasy – 星梦情真 (2002)
- Fix My Life – 整你的人生 （2023)
- Furever Yours — 葱他，还是爱我 (2024)
- Genie In A Cup – 哇到宝 (2022)
- I Only Care For You – 我只在乎你 (2001)
- In Safe Hands – 守护星 (2022)
- Let It Shine – 萤火虫的梦 (2007)
- Life Angel – 生命天使 (2009)
- Lost Soul – 另类佳人 (1999)
- Love at First Bite – 遇见你真香 (2022)
- Love Coded – 爱不虚拟 (2024)
- Lucky Numbers – 发财八百万 (2002)
- Magical Hands – 猜心妙手 (2006)
- Moments — 时光倾城 (2024)
- Money Game – 金钱本色 (2006)
- My One and Only — 只此一家 (2023)
- My Teacher Is A Thug – 爱.不迟疑 (2017)
- Precious Babes – 3个女人一个宝 (2010)
- Rhapsody in Blue – 蓝色仙人掌 (2006)
- Shuang Xiang Pao – 双响炮 (2008)
- Something Good – 算了,算了... (2001)
- Soul Old Yet So Young — 心里住着老灵魂 (2021)
- The Beautiful Scent – 美丽的气味 (2008)
- The Blockbusters – 巨舞霸 (2024)
- The Cellphone Swap — 爱情乱码 (2025)
- The Enchanted – 浴女图 (2013)
- The Gift of Time — 你好，再见 (2025)
- The Greatest Love of All – 爱·特别的你 (2007)
- The Millennium Bug – 千年虫 (1999)
- The Spirit Hunter - 带剑女孩 (2025)
- The Stratagem – 世纪攻略 (2001)
- The Sky is Still Blue - 从零开始 (2023)
- The Vagrant – 豹子胆 (2002)
- Three Women and A Half – 三个半女人 (2001)
- Through It All – 海的儿子 (2006)
- Time to Heal – 等一个晴天 (2006)
- Happy Prince – 快乐王子 (2020)
- True Heroes – 真心英雄 (2003)
- Under The Net — 力挽狂篮 (2025)
- Wok of Life – 福满人间 (1999)

==== Family drama series ====
- A Good Wife – 亲爱的，我爱上别人了 (2016)
- A New Life – 有福 (2005)
- A Promise for Tomorrow – 拥抱明天 (2005)
- All is Well – 你那边怎样.我这边OK (2019)
- Baby Bonus – 添丁发财 (2009)
- Beautiful Connection – 九层糕 (2002)
- Blessings – 祖先保佑 (2014)
- By My Side – 不凡的爱 (2008)
- Daddy at Home – 企鹅爸爸 (2009)
- Dear Neighbours – 我的左邻右里 (2019)
- Dear, Dear Son-In-Law – 女婿当家 (2007)
- Devotion – 阿娣 (2011)
- Family Ties – 家人之间 (2023)
- Fifty & Fabulous – 五零高手 (2018)
- Good Luck – 百岁大吉 (2015)
- Hainan Kopi Tales – 琼园咖啡香 (2000)
- Hand In Hand – 手牵手 (2015)
- Have A Little Faith – 相信我 (2017)
- Heart to Heart – 心点心 (2018)
- Hero – 大英雄 (2016)
- Holland V – 荷兰村 (2003)
- House of Joy – 欢乐满屋 (2006)
- How Are You? – 好世谋 (2019)
- Gonna Make It – 小小传奇 (2013)
- I'm in Charge – 小子当家 (2013)
- I Love My Home – 我爱我家 (2004)
- It Takes Two – 对对碰 (2012)
- It's a Wonderful Life – 好运到 (2013)
- Kinship I & II – 2007
- La Femme – 绝对佳人 (2008)
- Live Again – 天堂鸟 (2007)
- Love Blossoms I – 心花朵朵开 (2008)
- Love Blossoms II – 心花朵朵开 (2008)
- Love is Beautiful – 美丽家庭 (2003)
- Love Thy Neighbour – 四个门牌一个梦 (2011)
- Man of the House – 男人当家 (2007)
- Measure of Man – 大男人, 小男人 (2006)
- Mightiest Mother-in-Law – 最强岳母 (2017)
- My Buddy – 难兄烂弟 (2009)
- My Teacher, My Friend – 小岛醒了 (1999)
- My Home Affairs – 家事 (2000)
- My Kampong Days – 家在半山芭 (2010)
- My Lucky Charm – 情来运转 (2005)
- My Mighty-in-Laws – 野蛮亲家 (2004)
- Nanny Daddy – 奶爸百分百 (2008)
- New Beginnings – 红白囍事 (2010)
- On the Fringe 2011 – 边缘父子 (2011)
- Our Rice House – 我们的饭店 (2008)
- Portrait of Home I & II – 同心圆 (2005)
- Priceless Wonder – 游戏人生 (2010)
- Super Senior – 长辈甜心 (2015)
- The Defining Moment – 沸腾冰点 (2008)
- The Dream Job – 绝世好工 (2016)
- The Golden Path – 黄金路 (2007)
- The In-Laws – 麻婆斗妇 (2011)
- The Ties that Bind – 家财万贯 (2004)
- The Beginning – 原点 (2007)
- The Shining Star – 星闪闪 (2006)
- The Wing of Desire – 天使的诱惑 (2002)
- Three Wishes – 三个愿望 (2014)
- Tiger Mum – 虎妈来了 (2015)
- Timeless Gift – 遗情未了 (2004)
- To Mum with Love – 非一般妈妈 (2004)
- Say Cheese – 西瓜甜不甜 (2018)
- Uniquely Ours – 异家人 (2024)
- Viva Le Famille – 好儿好女 (Season 1: 2002; Season 2: 2003)
- Walk With Me – 谢谢你出现在我的行程里 (2019)
- Welcome Home, My Love – 快乐一家 (2009)
- Where The Heart Belongs — 心有所依 (2025)
- Where the Heart Is – 大城情事 (2008)
- While You Were Away – 一切从昏睡开始 (2019)
- Women of Times – 至尊红颜 (2006)
- You Are The One – 二分之一缘分 (2005)
- Your Hand In Mine – 想握你的手 (2009)
- Your World In Mine – 你的世界我们懂 (2022)

==== Fantasy drama series ====
- Fairy of the Chalice – 夜光神杯 (2006)
- Happily Ever After – 凡间新仙人 (2007)
- The Investiture of the Gods – 封神英雄榜 (2014)
- Strange Tales of Liao Zhai 2 – 聊斋奇女子 (2008)
- Switched! -幸运星 (2007)
- The Legend and the Hero – 封神榜 (2009)
- The Legend and the Hero 2 – 封神榜之武王伐纣 (2012)
- The Lucky Stars – 福禄寿三星报喜 (2005)
- The Scarlet Kid – 红孩儿 (2009)
- Prelude of Lotus Lantern – 宝莲灯前传 (2010)
- Zero to Hero – 阴差阳错 (2005)

==== Legal drama series ====
- Day Break – 天空渐渐亮 (2019)
- Family Matters – 法庭俏佳人 (2006)
- Innocently Guilty – 法内有情天 (2002)
- Justice in the City – 庭外和解 (2012)
- Legal Eagles – 法网天后 (2017)
- Never Too Late — 最佳遗产 (2024)
- The Family Court – 走进走出 (2010)

==== Medical drama series ====
- A Child's Hope – 孩有明天 (Season 1: 2003; Season 2: 2004)
- A Life of Hope – 活下去 (2005)
- Life Is Beautiful – 初一的心願 (2015)
- On the Frontline – 穿梭生死线 (2000)
- Rescue 995 – 995 (2012)
- The Caregivers – Missy 先生 (2014)
- The Oath – 行医 (2011)
- The Unbreakable Bond – 寄生 (2022)
- You Can Be an Angel Too – 你也可以是天使 (2015)
- You Can Be an Angel 2 – 你也可以是天使2 (2016)
- You Can Be An Angel 3 – 你也可以是天使3 (2018)
- You Can Be An Angel 4 – 你也可以是天使4 (2022)

==== Melodrama series ====
- Break Free – 曙光 (2013)
- Rhythm of Life – 变奏曲 (2008)
- Soup of Life – 砂煲肉骨茶 (2014)
- Till the End – 陪你到最后 (2023)
- The Seeds of Life – 渔米人家 (2012)
- With You – 我在你左右 (2010)

==== Musical drama series ====
- Crescendo – 起飛 (2015)
- Live Your Dreams – 大大的夢想 (2021)

==== Period drama series ====
- A Song to Remember – 星洲之夜 (2011)
- An Ode to Life – 三十风雨路 (2004)
- Bukit Ho Swee – 河水山 (2002)
- Code of Honour – 正义武馆 (2011)
- Heroes in Black – 我来也 (2001)
- Emerald Hill - The Little Nyonya Story - 小娘惹之翡翠山 (2025)
- In Pursuit of Peace – 何日军再来 (2001)
- Kampong Ties – 甘榜情 (2011)
- My Fair Lady – 我爱钟无艳 (2005)
- My Mini-Me & Me – 很久以后的未来 – (2021)
- Springs of Life – 春到人间 (2002)
- Stepping Out – 出路 (1999)
- The Dragon Heroes – 赤子乘龙 (2005)
- The Journey: A Voyage – 信约：唐山到南洋 (2013)
- The Journey: Our Homeland – 信约：我们的家园 (2015)
- The Journey: Tumultuous Times – 信约：动荡的年代 (2014)
- The Little Nyonya – 小娘惹 (2008)
- The Quarters – 猪仔馆人家 (2012)
- The Palm of Ru Lai – 新如来神掌(2005)
- Till We Meet Again – 千年来说对不起 (2018)
- Together – 当我们同在一起 (2009)
- Precious – 千金 (2014)

==== Police procedural drama series ====
- C.I.D – 刑警2人组 (2006)
- C.L.I.F. – 警徽天职 (2011)
- C.L.I.F. 2 – 警徽天职2 (2013)
- C.L.I.F. 3 – 警徽天职3 (2014)
- C.L.I.F. 4 – 警徽天职4 (2016)
- C.L.I.F. 5 – 警徽天职5之海岸卫队 (2019)
- Crime Busters x 2 – 叮当神探 (2008)
- Dare to Strike – 扫冰者 (2000)
- Devil's Blues – 叛逆战队 (2004)
- Metamorphosis – 破茧而出 (2007)
- The Crime Hunters – 心网追杀 (2004)
- The Driver – 伺机 (2020)
- Unforgivable – 不可饶恕的罪恶 (2024)
- Unriddle – 最火搭档 (2010)
- Unriddle 2 -最火搭档2 (2012)

==== Romance drama series ====
- 96°C Café – 96 °C 咖啡 (2013)
- A Million Dollar Dream – 给我一百万 (2018)
- A Mobile Love Story – 爱情占线 (2008)
- A Tale of 2 Cities – 乐在双城 (2011)
- An Enchanted Life – 钻石情缘 (2005)
- Always on My Mind – 无炎的爱 (2003)
- As You Like It – 随心所遇 (2010)
- Babies On Board – 新生 (2018)
- Beautiful Trio – 大女人小女人 (2004)
- Beyond Words – 爱要怎么说 (2016)
- Bountiful Blessings – 万福楼 (2011)
- Close Your Eyes – 闭上眼就看不见 (2018)
- CTRL— 操控 (2021)
- Dream Coder – 梦想程式 (2016)
- Falling in Love – 情有可缘 (2007)
- Friends Forever – 我爱麻糍 (2010)
- Hello Miss Driver – 下一站，遇见 (2019)
- Her Many Faces – 有你终身美丽 (2010)
- I Do, Do I? — 嫁给不同世界的你 (2023)
- In The Name Of Love – 最爱是你 (2014)
- Joys of Life – 花样人间 (2012)
- Knotty Liaison – 爱情百科 (2000)
- Lion.Hearts – 谈谈情，舞舞狮 (2009)
- Looking for Stars – 星锁 (2000)
- Love Concierge – 爱的掌门人 (2005)
- Love at 0°C – 爱情零度C (2006)
- Love At Risk – 爱情风险 (2013)
- Love Is All Around – 爱在你左右 (2008)
- Love Me, Love Me Not – (真爱无敌) (2001)
- Loving You – 爱。。。没有距离 (2020)
- Making Miracles – 奇迹 (2007)
- Man at Forty – 跑吧！男人 (2004)
- Mars vs Venus – 幸福双人床 (2007)
- My Love, My Home – 同一屋檐下 (2003)
- My Star Bride – 过江新娘 (2021)
- Oppa, Saranghae! — 欧吧，我爱你 (2023)
- Pillow Talk – 再见单人床 (2011)
- Spice Siblings – 辣兄辣妹 (2004)
- Romance De Amour – 1加1等于3 (2003)
- Romantic Delicacies – 美食厨师男 (2009)
- Room in My Heart – 真心蜜语 (2004)
- Sealed with a Kiss – 吻我吧，住家男 (2015)
- Spice Up – 幸福料理 (2014)
- Taste of Love – 缘之烩 (2008)
- To Be Loved — 非爱不可 (2024)
- The Dream Catchers – 未来不是梦 (2009)
- The Gentlemen – 来自水星的男人 (2016)
- The Good Fight – 致胜出击 (2019)
- The Peak – 最高点 (2007)
- The Rainbow Connection – 舞出彩虹 (2005)
- Yes We Can! – 我们一定行！ (2014)
- Yours Always – 让爱自邮 (2006)

==== Media industry drama series ====
- After the Stars – 攻星计 (2019)
- Poetic Justice – 微笑正义 (2012)
- The Dream Makers – 志在四方 (2013)
- The Dream Makers II – 志在四方II (2015)
- The Lead – 第一主角 (2017)

==== Office politics drama series ====
- A Jungle Survivor – 森林生存记 (2020)
- The Grind - 职不值得 (2026)

==== Science-fiction drama series ====
- 29th February – 229明天见 (2018)
- Beyond – X元素 (2012)
- Beyond the aXis of Truth – 法医X档案 (2001)
- Beyond the aXis of Truth II -法医X档案 2 (2005)
- Blessings – 祖先保佑 (2014)
- Blessings 2 – 祖先保佑2 (2018)
- Fixing Fate — 命运使者 (2025)
- If Tomorrow Comes – 再见明天 (2024)
- Mister Flower – 花花公子 (2021)
- Moon Fairy – 奔月 (2003)
- My Friends from Afar – 知星人 (2017)
- The Unbeatables I – 双天至尊I (1993)
- The Unbeatables II – 双天至尊II (1996)
- The Unbeatables III – 双天至尊 III (2002)

==== Sitcom ====
- A Blessed Life – 吉人天相 (2015)
- All Around You – 回路网 (2020)
- Don't Worry, Be Healthy – 家有一保 (2016)
- My First School – 快乐第一班 (2016)

==== Socio-drama series ====
- 118 – 118 (2014)
- 118 II – 118 II (2016)
- Eat Already? – 吃饱没？ (2016)
- Eat Already? 2 – 吃饱没2 (2017)
- Eat Already? 3 – 吃饱没3 (2017)
- Eat Already? 4 – 吃饱没4 (2018)
- Families on the Edge – 一家都不能少 (2015)
- Fire Up – 美味下半场 (2016)
- Healing Heroes – 医生不是神 (2022)
- I Want To Be A Towkay 亲家冤家做头家 (2022)
- Jalan Jalan – 带你去走走 (2018)
- Kopi-O II – 浓浓咖啡乌 (2002)
- Life - Fear Not – 人生无所畏 (2015)
- Life Less Ordinary – 小人物向前冲 (2017)
- Old Is Gold – 老友万岁 (2019)
- Peace & Prosperity – 富贵平安 (2016)
- Reach For The Skies – 不平凡的平凡 (2018)
- Recipe of Life – 味之道 (2020)
- The Heartland Hero – 邻里帮 (2021)
- You Light Up My Life – 如何对你说 (2001)
- Whatever Will Be, Will Be - 天公疼憨人 (2023)

==== Sports drama series ====
- Beach.Ball.Babes – 球爱大战 (2008)
- Hope Afloat — 浴水重生 (2024)
- No Limits – 泳闯琴关 (2010)
- Table of Glory – 乒乓圆 (2009)
- The Champion – 任我遨游 (2004)
- World at Your Feet – 球在你脚下 (2014)

==== Education drama series ====
- Don't Stop Believin' - 我们等你! (2012)
- Last but not Least - 迷茫又无惧的我们 (2026)
- My School Daze - 书包太重 (2009)
- While We Are Young - Z世代 (2017)

==== Standalone drama ====
- Voyage of Love – 爱。起航 (2019)

==== Suspense drama series ====
- Against The Tide – 逆潮 (2014)
- Angel's Dream – 真相 (2000)
- Beautiful Illusions – 镜中人 (2005)
- Doppelganger – 入侵者 (2018)
- Entangled – 日落洞 (2014)
- Gifted – 天之骄子 (2018)
- Disclosed – 揭秘 (2013)
- Mind Jumper – 觸心罪探 (2021)
- Mind Matters – 心。情 (2018)
- If Only I Could – 十年…你還好嗎？ (2016)
- Shero (2023)
- Silent Walls – 密宅 (2023)
- The Homecoming – 十三鞭 (2007)
- The Undisclosed – 迷云二十天 (2006)
- The Score – 无花果 (2010)
- The Truth – 谜图 (2008)
- The Truth Seekers – 真探 (2016)
- Key Witness – 关键证人 (2021)
- The Ultimatum – 双子星 (2009)
- When the Time Comes – 一线之间 (2004)

==== Wuxia series ====
- Madam White Snake – 白蛇新传 (2001)
- Master Swordsman Lu Xiaofeng – 陆小凤之决战前后 (2001)
- Master Swordsman Lu Xiaofeng 2 – 陆小凤之凤舞九天 (2001)
- The Last Swordsman – 天下第一 (2007)
- The Legend of Lu Xiaofeng – 陆小凤传奇 (2009)
- The Legendary Swordsman – 笑傲江湖 (2000)
- The Heaven Sword and Dragon Saber – 倚天屠龙记 (2004)
- The Shaolin Warriors – 少林僧兵 (2009)

== Others (Hong Kong and Taiwan) ==
Year Aired	English title	Chinese title
1996	Blood of Good and Evil	我本善良
1998	A Stage of Turbulence	刀馬旦
1998	Cold Blood Warm Heart	天地男兒
2000	Forty Something	男人四十一頭家
2000	Fate of the Clairvoyant	再見亦是老婆
2000	Crime of Passion	掃黃先鋒
2001	Burning Flame	烈火雄心
2001	Rural Hero	離島特警
2001	Justice Sung	狀王宋世傑
2001	Healing Hands	妙手仁心
2001	Armed Reaction	陀槍師姐
2001	ICAC Investigators 1996	廉政行動1996
2001	Journey to the West II	西遊記（貳）
2001	Divine Retribution	世紀之戰
2001	Untraceable Evidence II	鑑證實錄II
2001	A Dream Named Desire	美麗傳說
2001	Outburst	900重案追兇
2001	Detective Investigation Files IV	刑事侦缉档案IV
2001	Drunken Angels	男人四十打功夫
2001	To Where He Belongs	縱橫天下
2002	War and Remembrance	乾隆大帝
2002	Happy Ever After	金玉滿堂
2002	Ultra Protection	非常保鑣
2002	King of Gambler	千王之王重出江湖
2002	Justice Sung II	狀王宋世傑（貳）
2002	Witness to a Prosecution	洗冤錄
2002	Armed Reaction II	陀槍師姐II
2002	Road to Eternity	布袋和尚
2003	At the Threshold of an Era II	创世纪II天地有情
2004	Light of Million Hopes	萬家燈火
2005	Treasure Raiders	萧十一郎
2005	Fate Twisters	黑夜彩虹
2005	Doomed to Oblivion	鄭板橋
2005	Square Pegs	戆夫成龙
2005	Love and Again	驳命老公追老婆
2005	The White Flame	红衣手记
2005	My Date with a Vampire III	我和僵尸有个约会III 之永恒国度
2005	Lofty Waters Verdant Bow	云海玉弓缘
2006	A Dream Named Desire II	美麗傳說2星願
2006	Not Just a Pretty Face	美丽在望
2006	Survivor's Law	律政新人王
2006	In the Realm of Fancy	缱绻仙凡间
2006	Seed of Hope	俗世情真
2006	The 'W' Files	衛斯理
2006	Danger Counter	危险人物
2006	Thunder Cops	暴风型警
2006	Central Affairs	情陷夜中環
2006	Point of No Return	西关大少
2006	Riches and Stitches	鳳舞香羅
2006	The Great Adventure	大冒险家
2006	Better Halves	金牌冰人
2006	Net Deception	追魂交易
2006	To Love With No Regrets	足秤老婆八两夫
2006	Lady Fan	烽火奇遇结良缘
2007	Central Affairs II	情陷夜中環II
2007	The Threat of Love II	Loving You 我愛你2
2007	Twin of Brothers	大唐双龙传
2007	Hidden Treasures	鸭寮街的金蛋
2007	A Handful of Love	一屋两家三姓人
2007	To Catch the Uncatchable	栋笃神探
2007	The Last Breakthrough	天涯侠医
2007	My Family	甜孙爷爷
2020	Big White Duel: Season 1	白色强人1
2022	Armed Reaction 2021	陀枪师姐2021
2023	Plan B	宝宝大过天
2023	The Witness	目击证人
2022	Kids' Lives Matter	星空下的仁医
2021	Life After Death	那些我爱过的人
2022	Modern Dynasty	家族荣耀
2021	Shadow of Justice	伙计办大事
2023	Big White Duel 2	白色强人2
2024	A Perfect Man	有种好男人
2024	The Queen of News	新闻女王
2024	Speakers of Law	法言人
2025	Modern Dynasty 2 : The Heir to the Throne	家族榮耀之繼承者

Taiwanese drama series

Aired date	English title	Chinese title
29 October 2003	Hard Fact of Life	世間路
12 July 2004	Keep Me Company	伴阮過一生
4 October 2004	Friendly Relatives	親戚不計較
12 January 2005	The Orthodox Professor	流氓教授
20 January 2005	Woman Of Steel	長男的媳婦
27 February 2005	Devoted Love	深情 – 孤女的願望
20 March 2005	Deep Affections	愛你入骨
1 April 2005	Never Ending Love	不了情
29 June 2005	Feuding Ties	情義
30 June 2005	Japanese Wife	家有日本妻
10 July 2005	Love Eatery	愛情風味屋
29 August 2005	Strokes of Life	金枝玉葉
14 October 2005	Riches from Heaven	富貴在天
25 November 2005	Tales of Fan Li Hua	移山倒海樊梨花
27 December 2005	Fiery Thunderbolt	台湾霹雳火
6 January 2006	The Butterfly Lovers	七世夫妻之梁山伯與祝英台
14 March 2006	Upmost Sun	日正當中
5 April 2006	Unrequited Love	某大姊
9 June 2006	The Unforgettable Memory	意難忘
9 November 2008	Love	愛
26 October 2009	Taiwan Tornado	台灣龍捲風
26 July 2010	Liu Bo Wen	神機妙算劉伯溫
22 October 2010	Time Story	光陰的故事
20 January 2011	Golden Ferris Wheel	金色摩天輪
27 February 2011	Night Market Life	夜市人生
25 March 2011	Love Above All	真情滿天下
1 August 2012	Unique Flavor	天下第一味
30 October 2013	My Family My Love	天下父母心
13 March 2015	A Place Called Home	娘家
5 July 2015	Lee's Family Reunion	家和萬事興
19 May 2018	Spring Flower	春花望露
7 November 2018	Taste of Life	甘味人生
13 March 2022	100% Wife	金家好媳妇
