= Tiffany Leong =

Malaysian actress

- Born: 24 October 1985; Malaysia
- Died: 28 December 2015 (aged 30); Kuala Lumpur, Malaysia
- Occupations: Actress, host and model
- Years active: 2006–2015

Chinese name
- Simplified Chinese: 梁丽芳
Transcriptions
Standard Mandarin
- Hanyu Pinyin: Liāng Lìfāng
Yue: Cantonese
- Jyutping: loeng4 lai6 fong1

Tiffany Leong (simplified Chinese: 梁丽芳; traditional Chinese: 梁麗芳; pinyin: Liáng Lìfāng; 24 October 1985 – 28 December 2015), was a Malaysian actress, host and model based in Singapore.

On 28 December 2015, Leong died due to neuroendocrine cancer tumors, aged 30.

== Personal life and career ==
Leong was a model and beauty queen before joining Astro and enjoyed some success as a television hostess. She switched to acting in 2006 and joined MediaCorp in Singapore. Initially she was mostly cast in Singapore-Malaysia co-productions and made her debut in a Singapore-produced series in the 2008 drama La Femme. She was nominated for the Top 10 Most Popular Female Artistes at the 2011 Star Awards.

In 2006, Leong filmed two dramas, The Beginning and Falling in Love, in supporting roles. In 2007, she filmed two more dramas called, Man of the House and Fallen Angel.

In 2008, Leong filmed the dramas La Femme and Where the Heart Is and in 2009, she filmed My Destiny and Welcome Home, My Love. In 2010, she filmed four dramas, but had only supporting roles, she acted in dramas like Tribulations of Life, Injustice, Priceless Wonder and Friends Forever .

In 2011, she managed to film two more dramas Code of Honour and Prosperity.

In 2012, she filmed two dramas The Quarters and Laws of Attraction. In 2013, she filmed in one drama called 2013 Radio Rhapsody due to her illness. In 2015, she managed to film a drama called Mind Game despite her battle with cancer.

=== Health and death ===
In July 2013, the former Mediacorp artiste was diagnosed with multiple endocrine neoplasia (MEN) syndrome, and was later confirmed to have neuroendocrine cancer tumors in her liver. She had 60 per cent of her liver removed, and returned to work in late 2014.

On 24 December 2015, Leong was admitted to a hospital in Kuala Lumpur after suffering a relapse. She died on the afternoon of 28 December 2015. Her funeral was held at Nilai Memorial Park and was cremated.

== Filmography ==
Year	Work	Role	Notes	Ref
2006	The Beginning 原点			
2006	Falling in Love 情有可缘			
2007	Man of the House 男人当家	Joe		
2007	Fallen Angel 天使的烙印	Zhang Kaiqing		
2008	La Femme 绝对佳人	Qian Minmin 钱敏敏		
2008	Where the Heart Is 大城情事	Wu Jinhua 吴金花		
2009	My Destiny 幸福满贯	Du Lihong		
2009	Welcome Home, My Love 快乐一家	Jiang Jianing		
2010	Tribulations of Life 浮生劫	Pang Qiuming 庞秋明	Supporting Role	
2010	Injustice 血蝴蝶	Jian Shuman 简舒曼		
2010	Priceless Wonder 游戏人生	Xu Yuxuan 徐宇萱		
2010	Friends Forever 我爱麻糍	Funny 蔡若楠		
2011	Code of Honour 正义武馆	Yuan Yueming 元月明		
2011	Prosperity 喜事年年	Natalie		
2012	The Quarters 猪仔馆人家	Mao Dawan 毛大碗		
2012	Laws of Attraction 寂寞同盟	Grace		
2013	Radio Rhapsody 岁月留声	Fang Ling 方羚		
2015	Mind Game 心迷	Liu Jingxiang 刘静香		

== Awards and nominations ==
Year	Ceremony	Award	Result
2011	Star Awards	Top 10 Most Popular Female Artistes	Nominated
