= Stella Chung =

Malaysian actress and singer

- Born: Chung Siaw Yih; 9 July 1981 (age 45); Sibu, Malaysia
- Occupations: Actress, singer
- Years active: 2004–present
- Spouses: Edmond Teh (m. 2012; ann. 2013) Hanz Lee (m. 2020)

Chinese name
- Traditional Chinese: 鍾曉玉
- Simplified Chinese: 钟晓玉
Transcriptions
Standard Mandarin
- Hanyu Pinyin: Zhōng Xiǎoyù

Alternative Chinese name
- Traditional Chinese: 鍾曉玉
- Simplified Chinese: 钟晓玉
Transcriptions
Standard Mandarin
- Hanyu Pinyin: Zhōng Xiǎoyù
- Musical career
- Genres: Mandopop
- Label: Vertex Music (owned by Vertex New Media Sdn Bhd)

Stella Chung (Chinese: 钟晓玉; pinyin: Zhōng Xiǎoyù, born 9 July 1981) is a Malaysian actress and singer.

== Career ==
Stella started her entertainment career by making her debut as the leading actress in a local RTM Chinese drama. She then signed to Vertex Music in 2006 and released her first studio album in 2007. She has also starred in a number of Singaporean–Malaysian-co-produced Chinese dramas.

== Personal life ==
Chung was born in Sarawak and spent her schooling years in Sarikei. Her older brother, Nick Chung (Chinese: 钟盛忠), is also a singer.

== Filmography ==
=== Television ===
Year	Work	Role	Notes
2006	The Beginning 原点	Shi Tingli 石婷立	Co-production
2008	Where the Heart Is 大城情事	Yao Shanshan 姚珊珊	Co-production
2008	The Thin Line 还我情真	Liang Zhiling	Co-production; Nominated - Best Supporting Actress, 2010 Golden Awards
2011	The Adjusters II 稽查专用99999999		ntv7 production
2012	Summer Brothers 羽过天晴	Zhang Chenrou 张晨柔	ntv7 production

=== Film ===
Year	Work	Role	Notes
2013	Bad Students	Xiao Yu 小玉	Milk 6 Productions
2014	Bad Students 2	Xiao Yu 小玉	Milk 6 Productions
2015	Bad Students 3	Xiao Yu 小玉	Milk 6 Productions
2016	Incredible Students	Meng Nv 猛女	Milk 6 Productions
2017	Love In School	Ah Yu 阿玉	Milk 6 Productions
2019	Incredible Teachers	Discipline Master Xiao 萧主任/ Xiao Meng 小梦	Milk 6 Productions

== Discography ==
Album #	Album Information
1.1	Be Myself: Released: 11 February 2007 (Malaysia); Language: Mandarin Chinese; Label: Vertex Music; Genre:
1.2	Stellar: Released: 11 November 2008; Language: Mandarin Chinese; Label: Vertex Music; Genre:
1.3	第三章 (Chapter 3): Released: 20 September 2011; Language: Mandarin Chinese; Label: Vertex Music; Genre:
