= Laws of Attraction (TV series) =

Television series

- 寂寞同盟
- Genre: Dramedy
- Starring: Wayne Chua; Frederick Lee; Steve Yap; Tiffany Leong
- Country of origin: Malaysia
- Original language: Mandarin
- No. of episodes: 30

Production
- Running time: 60 minutes (approx.)

Original release
- Network: NTV7
- Release: 3 April – 23 May 2012

Related
- The Descendant; Unriddle 2

Laws of Attraction (Simplified Chinese: 寂寞同盟) is a Malaysian 2012 Mandarin drama series produced by Double Vision and NTV7. It was scheduled to be broadcast every Monday to Thursday at 10:00 p.m. on NTV7, replacing The Descendant, starting on 3 April 2012.

== Cast ==
Cast	Role	Description
Wayne Chua	Seto Wan Quan	
Frederick Lee	Ding Rou An	
Tiffany Leong	Grace	Psychologist; Owen's wife
Steve Yap	Owen	Veteran writer and columnist Grace's husband
Aenie Wong	Ru Fen	
Kyo Chen	Shao Wei	
Ernest Chong	Tian Zhi	
Angie Seow	Ha Mei	
Emily Zheng		
