= Smell of Rain (film) =

- Directed by: Gloria Chee
- Written by: Gloria Chee; Eileen Cheng
- Starring: Nat Ho; Trey Ho; Leah Low
- Cinematography: Terris Chiang
- Edited by: Terris Chiang
- Music by: Tay Chee Wei
- Production company: Smell of Rain Production
- Release date: 26 March 2006
- Running time: 93 minutes
- Country: Singapore
- Language: Mandarin
- Budget: $150,000

Smell of Rain (Chinese: 雨之味) is a 2006 Singaporean romantic drama directed by Gloria Chee, starring Nat Ho, Trey Ho and Leah Low. The film was Chee's directorial debut.

== Cast ==
- Nat Ho as Xiao Qi
  - Rhay Gynn as Little Xiao Qi
- Trey Ho as Kong Long
  - Chen Deyuan as Little Kong Long
- Leah Low as Li Er
- Renee Chua as Xiao Qi's Mum

== Release ==
The film premiered at The Picturehouse on 26 March 2006 as part of the Cathay's Opening Film Festival.

== Reception ==
Chen Yunhong of the Shin Min Daily News rated the film 3 stars out of 5. The film also received positive reviews from Leo Xinhui of My Paper and Wong Lung Hsiang of the Lianhe Zaobao.

Geoffrey Eu of The Business Times gave the film a rating of "C" and wrote that while it "has its artistic merits", it "falls short of forming a coherent and satisfying cinematic whole."
