= The Day It Rained on Our Parade =

- 那一年我们淋着雨
- Genre: National Day; Historical
- Starring: Eelyn Kok; Cynthia Koh; Pan Lingling; Chew Chor Meng; Aileen Tan; Priscelia Chan; Ng Hui
- Country of origin: Singapore
- Original language: Chinese
- No. of episodes: 4

Production
- Running time: approx. 45 minutes

Original release
- Network: MediaCorp Channel 8
- Release: 4 August – 25 August 2012

The Day It Rained on Our Parade (Chinese: 那一年我们淋着雨) is a 4-part Singaporean Chinese drama produced in conjunction with National Day and the 47th anniversary of independence from the British. It starred Eelyn Kok, Cynthia Koh, Pan Lingling, Chew Chor Meng, Aileen Tan, Priscelia Chan & Ng Hui as the casts of the series. It was telecasted on Singapore's free-to-air channel, MediaCorp Channel 8. It debuted on 4 August 2012, and screened every Saturday night at 10:30 pm, with a repeat telecast at Sunday afternoons at 12:00pm. The series was dubbed in English, Malay and Tamil and aired on Channel 5, Suria and Vasantham.

== Cast ==
- Pan Lingling as Lucy / Mu Shu Lan: She acted as the owner of Carnival Beauty Salon
- Cynthia Koh as Lu Lu 露露
- Eelyn Kok as Qiu Yan Ping 邱燕萍
- Chew Chor Meng
- Chen Huihui
- Aileen Tan as 肥妈
- Priscelia Chan as Liu Li Li 刘莉莉
- Ng Hui as Sister Maria 玛利亚修女
- Li Wenhai
- Wang Yuqing

== Plot ==
The story is about the 1968 National Day Parade and the characters, though fictional, and events are based on eyewitness accounts.

=== Episodes ===
No.	Title	Original airdate	Encore date	Rating
1	"Episode One"	4 August 2012	5 August 2012	PG
2	"Episode Two"	11 August 2012	12 August 2012	PG
3	"Episode Three"	18 August 2012	19 August 2012	
4	"Finale"	25 August 2012	26 August 2012	PG

== Production ==
To celebrate Singapore's 47th National Day, MediaCorp produced a drama based on the 1968 National Day Parade (NDP). As the 1968 NDP was held on a rainy day, the drama was named after the rainy day.

== See also ==
- List of programmes broadcast by Mediacorp Channel 8
