= Nat Ho =

Singaporean actor and singer

- Born: Nathaniel Ho Wei Ci
- Other name: He Weici
- Education: Anglo-Chinese School; Anglo-Chinese Junior College
- Occupations: Actor; singer; songwriter; businessman
- Years active: 2004–present
- Musical career
- Genre: Pop
- Instrument: Vocals

Stage name
- Traditional Chinese: 鶴天賜
- Simplified Chinese: 鹤天赐
- Hanyu Pinyin: Hè Tiāncì

Birth name
- Traditional Chinese: 何維賜
- Simplified Chinese: 何维赐
- Hanyu Pinyin: Hé Wéicì

Korean name
- Hangul: 내트
- Revised Romanization: Naeteu
- McCune–Reischauer: Naet'ŭ

Nathaniel Ho Wei Ci is a Singaporean actor, singer, songwriter and businessman.

== Early life ==
Ho is of Hakka descent. He attended Anglo-Chinese School and Anglo-Chinese Junior College.

== Career ==
Ho was one of the top 30 contestants during the inaugural season of Singapore Idol in 2004. His first major acting role was in the Channel 5 drama Shooting Stars, which featured other Singapore Idol contestants.

The following year, Ho signed a contract with MediaCorp, and was cast in his first Chinese language drama series Honour and Passion.

Ho left MediaCorp in 2010 to focus on his music career. He stated that music was his real passion and that he actually "never wanted to be an actor. [All this] came as a bonus". He self-released his debut album Unleashed in April 2012.

In 2013, Ho moved to Taiwan to further his music career, after signing a nine-year music contract. He subsequently returned to Singapore after his recording company disbanded.

In 2020, Ho moved to Los Angeles to study music production at Icon Collective, a private music school. He returned to Singapore in 2022.

In August 2022, Ho moved again to South Korea to further his music career. He also signed up for Korean language classes at Yonsei University as a full-time student.

== Ventures ==
He used to own bento stall Love Bento, franchised Taiwanese bubble tea stall Bobii Frutii and Thai cheese toast shop Say Chiizu.

He is currently running an online keto diet business, which was started in Singapore. He is also a partner in The Jock Shop, a local men's underwear store.

He set up a private limited company called Seraph Media to help with his cash flow and CPF.

== Filmography ==
=== Television series ===
Year	Title	Role	Notes	Ref
2005	Shooting Stars	Ethan		
2006	Dream Chasers (梦。拼图)			
2006	Life Story			
2007	My Dear Kins (亲本家人)			
2007	Honour and Passion	Poh Mun Kok		
2007	Stories of Love, The Anthology 2			
2007	Metamorphosis	Wen Pin Liang	Cameo	
2007	The Golden Path	David	Cameo	
2008	En Bloc	Jude Lim		
2008	La Femme	Fang Baoguo		
2008	The Little Nyonya	Jonathan Li Xiuwen	Cameo	
2009	The A-Go-Go Princess (穿越阿哥哥)			
2009	The Dream-Catchers	Lin Jiajie		
2009	Polo Boys	Koh Boon Keong		
2009	Together	Louis	Cameo	
2010	Priceless Wonder	Lin Cailai		
2010	With You	Zhang Huan		
2012	Code of Law (Season 1)	Steven	Guest	
2012	Of Love & Hidden Charms	Ming		
2014	Soup of Life	Paul/ Wu Mingzhi		
2015–2018	Tanglin	Jay Lim Jun Kai		

=== Film ===
Year	Title	Role	Notes	Ref.
2005	Smell of Rain	Xiao Qi		
2008	Heng Or Huat (天降运财)			
2009	Autumn in March			
2011	Already Famous			

=== Variety show appearances ===
- 2006
  - Wish Upon A Star
- 2007
  - Crimewatch
  - Hey Gorgeous
  - President Star Charity 2007
  - The Cancer Charity Show 2007 (癌过有晴天)
  - Star Awards 2007
  - Let's Party with Food V (食福满人间V)
  - The Mission 4 (创业无敌手4)
- 2009
  - Okto Live – 3 Feb 2009
  - Hey Gorgeous! Finals 2009 (校花校草网上追赶跑) – 7 March 2009
  - Go Live! (综艺Go Live!) – 27 Apr 2009
  - Result is All (美就是一切) – 22 August 2009

=== Radio hosting ===
- YES 933 夜玩场 – 15 April 2010 to 14 May 2010 (9–11pm, every Thursday and Friday; co-host with Lin Peifen)

=== Variety and reality show hosting ===
- 2008
  - National Science Challenge 2008
- 2009
  - National Science Challenge 2009
  - Food Hometown 2 (美食寻根 2)
  - Celebrate 2010
- 2010
  - Go! YOG (艺起青奥) – 25 March 2010
  - Okto Minute of Fame – June to Sept 2010

=== Music video appearances ===
Year	Song title	Artist	Notes
2016	"One of These Days"	MICappella	

== Discography ==
=== Singles ===
- 2006
  - "December Stars"
- 2007
  - A Million Treasures sub-theme song
  - The Best Drama (剧欣卉集) – Happily Ever After theme song ("完美的爱情")
  - December Stars 2 Compilation – "Last Christmas"
- 2008
  - Mediacorp Lunar New Year Album Compilation (群星贺岁金鼠庆团圆) - "恭喜大家过新年"
  - NDP 2008 Theme Song – MTV
- 2009
  - Mediacorp Lunar New Year Album Compilation (群星贺岁福牛迎瑞年) - "新年到"

=== Songwriting credits ===
- "With You" (2023)
