= The Dream-Catchers =

Singaporean TV show

- 未来不是梦
- Genre: Romance, Engineering
- Created by: Yeo Saik Pin 杨锡彬
- Written by: Tang Yeow 陈耀
- Starring: Rui En; Tay Ping Hui; Jesseca Liu; Shaun Chen; Elvin Ng; Paige Chua; Nat Ho; Dawn Yeoh
- Opening theme: 拭目以待 by 林倛玉 (红毛派)
- Ending theme: 安全区 by 林倛玉
- Country of origin: Singapore
- Original language: Chinese
- No. of episodes: 20

Production
- Producer: Yeo Saik Pin （杨锡彬）
- Running time: approx. 45 minutes per episode

Original release
- Network: MediaCorp Channel 8
- Release: 4 February – 3 March 2009

The Dream-Catchers (Chinese: 未来不是梦) is a Singaporean Chinese modern romance drama which was telecasted on Singapore's free-to-air channel, MediaCorp Channel 8. It stars Rui En, Tay Ping Hui, Jesseca Liu, Shaun Chen, Elvin Ng, Paige Chua, Nat Ho and Dawn Yeoh as the casts of the series. It made its debut on 4 February 2009 and ended on 3 March 2009. This drama serial consists of 20 episodes, and was screened on every weekday night at 9:00 pm.

This drama is known for having cast members consisting mainly of young actors and actresses, and travelled to Japan and Bintan for filming.

The Economic Development Board is the main sponsor for this series.

== Plot ==
Lin Jia Le, Lin Jia Qi, Wang Zhi Wei and Jiang Cheng Feng are four young engineers from different arena but with the same dream of making the world a better place for mankind. In the pursuit of their dreams, their path crosses.

Jia Le always feels that she is cursed and misfortune will befall any man she falls in love with. She finally relented when Zhi Wei proves her wrong with his actions and sincerity. An accident changes Jia Le's mind and she escapes by joining a humanitarian mission, with Zhi Wei hot on her heels.

Jia Qi and Cheng Feng also fall in love, but the latter's ex-fiancée Shan Shan re-appears and wants to reconcile. Jia Qi is one who cannot tolerate any blemishes in a relationship and decides to step out of the competition and leaves the country, finding new love. But she returns to find a depressed Cheng Feng after Shan Shan's evil ploys are exposed and the sudden death of his father.

Due to the trouble and hardships between Cheng Feng and Jia Qi, Jia Qi finds comfort in her suitor, Sato. Sato proves to be a devoted lover to her and Jia Qi gradually falls in love with him while Cheng Feng is dragged down by Shan Shan.

In between everything, Xiaowei who has been friends with Zhi Wei ever since they were young, starts to fall in love with him, making things even more complicated for them.

== Cast ==
=== Main cast ===
- Rui En as Lin Jiaqi 林佳琪, an Aerospace engineer for Singapore Airlines and an artist
- Tay Ping Hui as Wang Zhiwei 王志伟, an electrical engineer for Chartered, Manager of Plant 7
- Jesseca Liu as Lin Jiale 林佳乐, an electrical engineer for Chartered at Plant 7
- Shaun Chen as Jiang Chengfeng 江乘风, a orecision engineer for Makino

Cast	Role	Description
Elvin Ng	Sato 佐藤	Aerospace engineer for Singapore Airlines; From Japan; Jiaqi's boyfriend and later husband Chengfeng's rival in love Went back to Japan with Jiaqi for a course in episode 11; Took Jiaqi to his home town Yamagata in episode 12; Returned from Japan and went to Jiaqi's home in episode 16; Went back to Japan with Jiaqi for good in episode 20; Had a child with Jiaqi in episode 20
Nat Ho	Lin Jiajie 林佳杰	Precision engineer for Makino, Dancer; English name: Elvin; Jiale and Jiaqi's younger brother Guodong's son Peipei's boyfriend Stopped Peipei from taking Ecstasy in episode 1 Forced to traffic drugs to save Peipei in episode 9 Won a special award in the dance competition in episode 20
Dawn Yeoh	Wang Peipei 王佩佩	Dancer; English name: Stephanie; Zhiwei's younger half-sister Wang Qiang's daughter Has a dance hostess for a mother Mother ran off with another man when she was 7 Used to be a juvenile delinquent Stopped by Jiajie from taking Ecstasy in episode 1 Turned over a new leaf in episode 11; Won a special award in the dance competition in episode 20
Paige Chua	Zhang Xiaowei 张小薇	Tomboy; Ruixiang's daughter Used to like Zhiwei; Jiale's rival in love Yuanjing's girlfriend Loves to play soccer Got into an accident in episode 19; Recovered in episode 20
Zhang Zhenhuan	Hu Yuanjing 胡远景	Electrical engineer for Chartered at Plant 7 From China; Used to like Jiale; Zhiwei's rival in love Xiaowei's boyfriend Confessed to Jiale via a DVD in episode 8

=== Other cast ===
Cast	Role	Description
Eelyn Kok	Li Shanshan 李珊珊	Chengfeng's ex-fiancée Jiaqi's rival in love Caused the folding of Chengfeng's father's business Indirectly caused the death of Chengfeng's father Consistently harasses Chengfeng; Sold her house to raise funds for Chengfeng in episode 10; Got into a car accident to stop Chengfeng from going to Japan in episode 13; Slapped by Chengfeng in episode 17; Fell down the stairs and became crippled in episode 20
Lin Meijiao	Zheng Aili 郑爱丽	Zhiwei's mother Wang Qiang's ex-wife
Hong Peixing 洪培兴	Wang Qiang 王强	Zhiwei and Peipei's father Aili's ex-husband Tried to sell his newborn baby boy in episode 13; Arrested for selling contraband cigarettes in episode 13; Released from prison in episode 17; Goes into a coma from overdose of aphrodisiacs in episode 18; Got a job as a security guard in episode 20; Turned over a new leaf in episode 20
Richard Low	Lin Guodong 林国栋	Precision engineer for Makino; Nickname: Lim-san; Jiale, Jiaqi and Jiajie's father Initially disapproved of Chengfeng for Jiaqi; Approved of Chengfeng for Jiaqi in episode 8 Initially disapproved of Peipei for Jiajie; Approved of Peipei for Jiajie in episode 20
Yan Bingliang	Zhang Ruixiang 张瑞祥	Xiaowei's father
Li Wenhai	Ye Xingyao 叶兴耀	Zhiwei's superior
Desmond Tan	Will	Aerospace engineer Sato and Jiaqi's colleague
Chen Chuanzhi 陈川之	Max	Aerospace engineer Sato and Jiaqi's colleague

== Reception ==
Average viewership for each episode is 964,000. It was the most popular show in 2010.

=== Accolades ===
Organisation	Year	Category	Nominee	Result	Ref.
Star Awards	2010	Favourite Male Character	Nat Ho	Won	
Star Awards	2010	Favourite Female Character	Jesseca Liu	Nominated	
Star Awards	2010	Favourite Female Character	Rui En	Nominated	
Star Awards	2010	Best Supporting Actress	Paige Chua	Nominated	
