= Star Idol Malaysia =

- Presented by: Dai Cai Yun; Tan Fun Pin
- Starring: Eunice Ng; Charles Jong
- Country of origin: Malaysia

Production
- Running time: 60 minutes

Original release
- Network: ntv7
- Release: June 8 – October 21, 2007

Star Idol Malaysia is Malaysian first ever reality drama competition. It began airing its first season on ntv7 on June 8, 2007

== Hosts/Judges ==
There are two hosts for this show Dai Cun Yun and Tai Fun Pin. 3 judges judge the performance of contestants every week in the final round. 2 judges are official whereas 1 judge is invited

- Eunice Ng
- Charles Jong
