= Mystique Valley =

- 诡雾山城
- Genre: Period Drama
- Directed by: Sam Au/David Lau
- Starring: Susan Leong; Jess Teong; Eric Chen; Jordan Voon; Aenie Wong
- Country of origin: Malaysia
- Original language: Chinese
- No. of episodes: 30

Production
- Producer: Double Vision Sdn Bhd
- Running time: 60 minutes (approx.)

Original release
- Network: ntv7
- Release: 9 November – 29 December 2010

Related
- Injustice; Unriddle; Tribulations of Life

Mystique Valley is a Malaysian period drama television series produced by Double Vision and ntv7. The series premiered on 9 November 2010 on Malaysian television and currently airs every Monday to Thursday at 10:00pm on Malaysia's ntv7.

== Synopsis ==
In this 30 episode drama, Jess Teong plays He Can Qing, a woman who returns to her hometown after spending years abroad in Australia. Her brother, He Zhong Xiong, the only son in the family, struggles to keep up with his mother's (Zhang Jin Yan, portrayed by Susan Leong) high expectations. Can Qing's uncle, He Xin Quan, plans to cheat the He family out of their fortune. Meanwhile, Auntie Tao wants her daughter, Shu Mei, to marry Zhong Xiong so they can enjoy a better life. Lin Ke Qiu, Zhong Xiong's lover, appears mysteriously after having disappeared for 20 years. As the plot unravels, Can Qing discovers some truths that change everyone's life. Now, Can Qing must think of a way to save the He family from the clutches of her uncle. Making matters worse, Auntie Tao is seeking revenge from the family for causing her daughter's death. Will Can Qing succeed in saving the He family?

== Cast ==
Cast	Character
Eric Chen Puie Kong	He Zhong Xiong
Susan Leong	Madam He/ Zhang Jin Yan
Jess Teong	Chris He Can Qing
Ng Kim Ying	Auntie Tao/ Li Yu Tao
Alice Yap	Lin Ke Qiu
Aenie Wong	Xu Shu Mei
Hishiko Woo	He Qi Qi
Elvis Chin	Tie Ming
Jordan Voon	He Xin Quan
