= La Femme (TV series) =

- 绝对佳人
- Genre: Modern Family Drama
- Starring: Zoe Tay; Tay Ping Hui; Ann Kok; Desmond Sim
- Opening theme: 女人 by Cai Mei Yi 蔡美仪
- Ending theme: 局外人 by Cai Mei Yi 蔡美仪
- Country of origin: Singapore
- Original language: Chinese
- No. of episodes: 25

Production
- Producer: Chia Mien Yang (谢敏洋)
- Running time: approx. 45 minutes per episode

Original release
- Network: MediaCorp TV Channel 8
- Release: 2 June – 4 July 2008

Related
- Rhythm of Life; Beach.Ball.Babes

La Femme (Chinese: 绝对佳人; previously known as 女人当自强) is a Singaporean Chinese modern family drama mainly emphasizing on the lives of three women of different traits. It was telecasted on Singapore's free-to-air channel, MediaCorp Channel 8. It made its debut on 2 June 2008 and ended on 4 July. This drama serial consists of 25 episodes, and was aired on every weekday night at 9:00 pm.

== Cast ==
- Zoe Tay as Fang Bao Yu 方宝玉
- Ann Kok as Lin Xiu Hui 林秀慧
- Tay Ping Hui as Huang Quan He 黄权和
- Tiffany Leong as Qian Min Min 钱敏敏
- Desmond Sim as Zhong Wei Xiang 钟伟祥
- Yao Wenlong as Zhang Jia Jie 张家杰
- Shaun Chen as Liang Xing Xiong 梁兴雄
- Paige Chua as Qian Ting Ting 钱婷婷
- Nat Ho as Fang Bao Guo 方宝国
- Clarence Hu as Huang Rongxuan 黄荣轩

== Accolades ==
Organisation	Year	Award	Nominee	Result	Ref.
Star Awards	2009	Young Talent Award	Clarence Hu 胡康乐	Nominated	
Star Awards	2009	Top 10 Highest Viewership Local Dramas in 2008 Award 十大最高收视率	—N/a	Won Highly Commended	
