= Tribulations of Life =

Malaysian TV drama

- 浮生劫
- Genre: Period drama (1970s)
- Starring: Tiffany Leong; Melvin Sia; William San; Lawrence Wong; Koh Yah Hwee; Brenda Chiah; Wymen Yong
- Countries of origin: Malaysia; Singapore
- Original language: Mandarin
- No. of episodes: 30

Production
- Running time: 60 minutes (approx.)

Original release
- Network: ntv7 (Malaysia)
- Release: 30 December 2010 – 23 February 2011

Related
- Mystique Valley; The Seeds of Life

Tribulations of Life is the 19th co-production of MediaCorp TV and ntv7. It is also the blockbuster drama for 2011. It aired from every Monday to Thursday, at 10:00pm on Malaysia's ntv7.

== Synopsis ==
Set during the 1970s and 1980s, Tribulations of Life revolves around the Fu family. The Fu family, aided by Jack Rolfe, is a typical Chinese business family torn apart by the tragic consequences of an extra-marital affair by the patriarch of the Fu family, Fu Ying Cai (Hong Guo Rui), which is extended to the next generation.

During their early years, brothers Fu Zi Long (Wymen Yang) and Fu Zi Hua (William San) witnessed the tragic death of their mother when she jumped to her death after discovering her husband's infidelity. Over the years, Zi Long has forgiven his father but his younger brother Zi Hua still harbours hostility and enmity towards his father's mistress Liang Shu Mei (Lin Yi Ting) and his half-brother, Fu Zi Cheng (Melvin Sia) and half-sister, Fu Zi Shan (Koh Yah Hwee) whom he blamed for his mother's tragic death.

As adults, both Zi Long and Zi Hua work in their father's Chinese medicine shop, Yi Cao Tang. But their step-mother Shu Mei harbours hope of her eldest son Zi Cheng taking over the Fu family business. After graduation, Zi Cheng was sent to work in Yi Cao Tang. But Zi Cheng faced much hostility and resentment, especially from Zi Hua, who has still not forgiven Shu Mei and her children.

Not only that, Zi Cheng who tries to make some changes in bid to keep up with the times while working at the medicine shop is faced with more difficulties and obstructions. He then decides to leave Yi Cao Tang for good. With the help of his good friend, Yang Di Sheng (Lawrence Wong), Zi Cheng is given a job in the Yang family's business, Yang Shi Qi Ye.

The story also tells the complicated love triangle involving Zi Cheng, Di Sheng, and Zi Hua with Pang Qiu Ming (Tiffany Leong) being the centre of conflict. Qiu Ming – the daughter of Uncle Gui (a loyal and trusted long-time employee of Yi Cao Tang, played by Ye Qing Fang) –has a thing for Zi Cheng since young. This however, has caused rivalry between Zi Cheng and his half-brother, Zi Hua, who has always liked Qiu Ming. Di Sheng, who also harbours feelings for Qiu Ming, resented Zi Cheng after knowing that both his loved one and good friend have feelings for each other.

The story plot continues with the Fu family's business ceasing operations when Shu Mei's brother, Liang Ru Guang (Zhang Shui Fa) and Zi Hua causes trouble in the aged old medicine shop. The Yang family's business, Yang Shi Qi Ye on the other hand, expands under the leadership of Zi Cheng who later hires Uncle Gui and Qiu Ming to help him. However, due to jealousy, Zi Cheng is accused by Di Sheng of falsifying accounts.

Qiu Ming who believes in Zi Cheng, pleads for him. Using that to blackmail Qiu Ming, the owner of Yang Shi Qi Ye, then forced her to marry his son, Di Sheng.

Will Zi Cheng be freed from the accusation with the sacrifice made by Qiu Ming? Will the loveless marriage between Di Sheng and Qiu Ming last and what are the consequences? Can Zi Cheng revive his family business and will he be reunited with the love of his life, Qiu Ming?

== Cast ==
=== The Fu Family ===
- Hong Guo Rui as Fu Ying Cai 傅英才
- Wymen Yang as Fu Zi Long 傅子龙
- William San as Fu Zi Hua 傅子华
- Melvin Sia as Fu Zi Cheng 傅子成
- Koh Yah Hwee as Fu Zi Shan 傅子珊
- Lin Yi Ting as Liang Shu Mei 梁淑媚

=== Other cast ===
- Lawrence Wong as Yang Di Sheng 杨迪生
- Tiffany Leong as Pang Qiu Ming 庞秋明
- Brenda Chiah as Jiang Hai Qi 江海淇
- Monday Kang as Tony
- Ye Qing Fang as Uncle Gui 贵叔
- Zhang Shui Fa as Liang Ru Guang
