= My Destiny (Malaysian TV series) =

- 幸福满贯
- Starring: Hishiko Woo; Ann Kok; Tiffany Leong
- Countries of origin: Malaysia; Singapore
- Original language: Mandarin
- No. of episodes: 25

Production
- Running time: approx. 45 minutes

Original release
- Network: ntv7 (Malaysia); MediaCorp Channel 8 (Singapore)
- Release: 2008 – 2008

Related
- My Kampong Days; Timeless Season

My Destiny (Chinese: 幸福满贯) is a Malaysian–Singaporean Mandarin-language television drama co-produced by ntv7 and MediaCorp TV that aired in 2008. The ensemble cast includes Hishiko Woo, Ann Kok (Guo Shuxian), Tiffany Leong (Liang Lifang), and Kyo (Zhuang Zhongwei).

== Synopsis ==
The story begins with Li Ruo Nan's family shifting to a new house. Ruo Nan's father, played by Lee Boon Hai owns a furniture shop. The tomboy-ish Ruo Nan met with a guy (Kyo Chen). They were enemies at first but soon they became best friends. As time passes, Ruo Nan fell in love with him. But sadly he did not like Ruo Nan. This made Ruo Nan sad. She ignored him since. Then, he realised that he actually like her and he tried to woo her back. Ruo Nan was badly wounded at that time and she refused to accept him.

Meanwhile, Ruo Nan's auntie (Ann Kok) is a lazy person. Usually, Ruo Nan's father, Yao Guang will clean up the mess for her. Yao Guang met a woman whom he sympathised with. Ruo Nan's mother became jealous. Yao Guang can not put up with her behaviour anymore and he moved out of that house. One day, Ruo Nan's mother went for a medical check-up and the doctor discovered a tumour in her breast. She refused an operation to remove the tumour, thus Ruo Nan's mother condition worsens. Yao Guang's heart soften and he managed to advise her to undergo the operation.

== Cast ==
- Hishiko Woo as Li Ruo Nan
- Tiffany Leong as Du Li Hong
- Johnson Lee as Wang Zhen Qiang
- Kyo Chen
- Ann Kok as Wang Zhen Hui
- Lee Boon Hai as Yao Guang
