= Dear, Dear Son-In-Law =

- 女婿当家
- Genre: Modern Drama
- Starring: Jeanette Aw; Pierre Png; Zhu Houren; Priscelia Chan; Renfred Ng
- Opening theme: Zui mei de ping fan by Daren Tan
- Country of origin: Singapore
- Original language: Chinese
- No. of episodes: 20

Production
- Running time: approx. 45 minutes

Original release
- Network: MediaCorp
- Release: October 16 – November 12, 2007

Related
- Metamorphosis; Live Again

Dear, Dear Son-in-Law (Chinese: 女婿当家) is a Singaporean Chinese modern family drama which was telecast on Singapore's free-to-air channel, MediaCorp TV Channel 8. It made its debut on 16 October 2007 and ended its run on 12 November 2007. It was screened at 9.00pm every weekday night and repeated every Saturday and Sunday from 4.30pm to 6.30pm. The serial consists of 20 episodes.

== Plot ==
Jiang Wencai seems to have it all, a stable career and a happy family, until his eldest daughter Jiang Yijuan unexpectedly announces her engagement to an assistant designer, Zhang Shunfa. Distrustful of Shunfa and yet unable to express his objections, Wencai offers to rent a room to him so that he can chaperone the couple as he plots to break them up.

Soon, however, Wencai realizes that his future son-in-law is not his only problem. His eldest son Junji is being led into risky investments by his capricious mother-in-law; his second daughter Yijun whom he was proud of returned from abroad without completing her degree; his neglected teenager son and daughter also get into trouble behind his back. In turn, it was Shunfa who helps him resolve his family problems.

Unable to take the many setbacks, Wencai collapses and falls sick. He then conceives a scheme with Shunfa to teach his children a lesson.

== Cast ==
=== Main cast ===
- Zhu Houren as Jiang Wencai who is the head of the household.
- Pierre Png as Zhang Shunfa. He is Wencai's prospective son-in-law. Initially At first, Zhang was going to marry Yijuan, Wencai's eldest daughter. He subsequently breaks up with her and falls in love with Yijun, Wencai's second daughter.
- Jeanette Aw as Jiang Yijun Nicknamed Chili Crab, Wencai's second daughter.

Cast	Role	Description
Zhang Yaodong	Jiang Junji	He is the first child of Jiang Wencai, a timid guy dominated by this mother-in-law and wife (Anna).
Priscelia Chan	Jiang Yijuan	She is the second child of Jiang Wencai, is a kind-hearted but somewhat a ditzy girl. She later breaks up with Shun Fa as she found a new boyfriend in the USA. She come back to Singapore after learning that his dad is 'ill'(fake). When she found out that Yijun and Shunfa are an item, she felt uneasy as she has broken up with her boyfriend in USA before coming back.
Mei Xin	Jiang Yilin (Eilien)	She is nicknamed Guai Bao Bao, which actually mean a child who is obedient, is the fourth child of Jiang Wencai, studying in a Junior College. She is also nicknamed Dinosaur because she does not have a boyfriend.
Renfred Ng	Jiang Junwei	He is nicknamed opposition party due to his rebellious nature. He is the fifth and also the youngest child of Jiang Wencai.
Li Yinzhu	Zhou Meibao	She is married to Jiang Wencai and the caring mother of the 5 children.
Joey Swee	Anna	wife of Jiang Junji(Zhang YaoDong), she is a calculative character who together with her mother, cheats her mother-in-law together.
Zhang Xinxiang	Darick	Effeminate fashion designer who works together with Shunfa. (Pondan)
Wu Luo Yi	Edward	Always keeps following Yi Jun, but Yi Jun doesn't want him. Introduced by Ben as a potential client for Yi Jun's direct selling business(before she became a photographer)
Margaret Lee	Pei Yun	Ben's ex-girlfriend. She broke up with Ben after finding out that he was cheating on her, seeking Jiang Wencai for comfort.
Ye Shipin	Ben	Jiang Wencai's subordinate. He is nicknamed The Dog as he is very good at sucking up to Jiang Wencai. He is also Jiang Wencai's drinking buddy.

== Reception ==
Avis Wong of The New Paper rated the drama 3.5 stars out of 5 with the drama having a good pace and story, with veterans acting well.

== Viewership ==
This drama series was the 5th highest rated drama in 2007.

Week	Date	Average Number of audience in 5 weekdays (Round off to nearest thousand)
Week 1	16 October 2007 to 19 October 2007	656, 000
Week 2	22 October 2007 to 26 October 2007	677, 000
Week 3	29 October 2007 to 2 November 2007	671, 000
Week 4	5 November 2007 to 9 November 2007	690, 000
Last Episode	12 November 2007	768, 000
