= Timeless Season =

Chinese Drama Series

- 平底高跟鞋
- Country of origin: Malaysia
- Original languages: Mandarin; Cantonese
- No. of episodes: 30

Production
- Running time: 60 minutes (approx.)

Original release
- Network: ntv7
- Release: 23 November 2009 – 2010

Related
- My Destiny; Friends Forever

Timeless Season is a Chinese drama series which co-produce by Double Vision and ntv7. It was aired every Monday to Thursday, at 10:00pm on Malaysia's ntv7.

== Cast ==
- Eunice Ng
- Kirby Chan
- Steve Yap
