= Priceless Wonder =

- 游戏人生
- Starring: Zen Chong; Tiffany Leong; Alan Tern; Priscelia Chan; Nat Ho; Xiang Yun
- Opening theme: 游戏人生 by Le Sheng, sung by Daren Tan
- Original language: Chinese
- No. of episodes: 20

Production
- Running time: approx. 45 minutes

Original release
- Network: MediaCorp TV Channel 8
- Release: 17 February – 16 March 2010

Related
- Happy Family; The Best Things in Life

Priceless Wonder (游戏人生) is a Singaporean drama which aired on Channel 8. It debuted on 17 February 2010 with a run of 20 episodes.

== Synopsis ==
Li Caishun is a bookie who followed in his father's footsteps. Despite this, he has a heart of gold and has been taking care of his mother Qiao E and brother Cailai ever since his father has been in and out of prison. He falls for Yuxuan, who works as a teller for a 4-D stand. Her widowed mother Bizhu gambled away their inheritance. Hence, Yuxuan detests all things related to gambling and jilts Caishun after finding out his real "occupation". Ironically, her older brother Guoxing is a CID officer who specialises in investigating gambling syndicates and often comes into conflict with his conscience after having to arrest his own mother on more than one occasion. Caishun decides to quit gambling for good but his resolve is tested when a tragedy hits his family and his and his father's past catches up with them.

== Cast ==
- Tiffany Leong as Xu Yuxuan 徐宇萱
- Zzen Chong as Li Caishun 李财顺. This is Chong's first lead role and also his first role as a good person.
- Alan Tern as Xu Guoxing 徐国兴
- Priscelia Chan as Lin Zhenni 林珍妮
- Xiang Yun as Su Bizhu 苏碧珠
- Nat Ho as Li Cailai 李财来
- Jin Yinji as Chen Qiao E 陈巧娥
- Yan Bingliang as Chen Youde 陈友德
- Kanny Theng as Starley
- Michelle Ng as Serene

== Reception ==
Average viewership for each episode is 875,000.
