= Priscelia Chan =

Singaporean actress (born 1978)

- Born: 6 November 1978 (age 47); Singapore
- Other name: Zeng Shimei
- Education: Bedok View Primary School; St. Hilda's Secondary School; Temasek Polytechnic
- Occupations: Actress; host
- Years active: 1999-present
- Spouse: Alan Tern (m. 2007)

Chinese name
- Traditional Chinese: 曾詩梅
- Simplified Chinese: 曾诗梅
- Hanyu Pinyin: Zēng Shīméi

Priscelia Chan Shih Mei (born 6 November 1978) is a Singaporean television actress and host.

== Career ==
Chan was a tax auditor before taking part in Star Search Singapore 1999. Despite being eliminated in the semifinals, she was offered a contract by TCS (later MediaCorp). She was initially cast in supporting roles in several Chinese-language television dramas produced by MediaCorp Channel 8, and made her debut as a lead actress in In Pursuit of Peace (2001) and Heartlanders III (2003). She acted in the mainland Chinese supernatural-fantasy television series The Legend and the Hero (2007). The series was aired on Channel 8 in 2009. She did not act in as many dramas in 2009 as she took several months off to finish her degree at SIM-RMIT.

Apart from acting, Chan has also performed songs for albums released by MediaCorp, with the latest being the MediaCorp 25th Anniversary Soundtrack Album. Chan also worked as a model for two television commercials for Fujifilm and Goldheart Jewellery in 2006 and 2007 respectively.

In 2023, Chan made her film debut in Don't Go Home Tonight, directed by Kelvin Sng.

== Personal life ==
Chan attended Bedok View Primary School and St. Hilda's Secondary School and obtained a diploma in accounting and finance from Temasek Polytechnic. She married fellow MediaCorp artiste Alan Tern, whom she first met while filming Springs of Life, on 6 October 2007. Since marrying, they have portrayed each other's spouse in Priceless Wonder and A Song to Remember.

== Filmography ==
=== Television series ===
| Year | Title | Role | Notes | Ref. |
|---|---|---|---|---|
| 2000 | Four Walls and a Ceiling | Chen Aitian | | |
| 2000 | The Legendary Swordsman | Yilin | | |
| 2001 | Beyond The Axis of Truth | Li Yiwen | | |
| 2001 | The Hotel | Huang Xiaomei | | |
| 2001 | In Pursuit of Peace | Ah-gui | | |
| 2002 | Bukit Ho Swee | Su Yanfen | | |
| 2002 | Fantasy | Fang Xiaoman | | |
| 2002 | Springs of Life | | | |
| 2003 | Love is Beautiful | Song Ying | | |
| 2003 | My Love My Home | Situ Haihan | | |
| 2003 | A Toast of Love | | | |
| 2003 | Heartlanders III | Lisa Gan | | |
| 2004 | I Love My Home | | | |
| 2004 | Double Happiness | Lin Meijiao, later Shirley | | |
| 2004 | Double Happiness II | Lin Meijiao, later Shirley | | |
| 2005 | My Sassy Neighbour | Xuan | | |
| 2005 | Heartlanders IV | Lisa Gan | | |
| 2005 | Beyond The aXis of Truth II | Chen Meishan | | |
| 2005 | Portrait of Home II | Li Xinmin | | |
| 2006 | My Sassy Neighbour 2 | Xuan | | |
| 2006 | A Million Treasures | Bai Liangliang | | |
| 2007 | My Sassy Neighbour 3 | Xuan | | |
| 2007 | The Legend and the Hero | Zixian | | |
| 2007 | Dear, Dear Son-In-Law | Jiang Yijuan | | |
| 2007 | The Golden Path | Lu Simin | | |
| 2008 | Calefare | | | |
| 2008 | Where The Heart Is | Feng Yuhan | | |
| 2008 | Love Blossoms | Ruan Erbo | | |
| 2008 | Love Blossoms II | Ruan Erbo | | |
| 2009 | Perfect Cut II | Kym | | |
| 2009 | The Legend and the Hero | Zixian | | |
| 2009 | The Pupil | Theresa Wong | | |
| 2010 | Priceless Wonder | Jenny Lin | | |
| 2010 | New Beginnings | Cleo | | |
| 2010 | Precious Babes | Lin Ailing | | |
| 2010 | Unriddle | Li Meiyue | | |
| 2010 | The Family Court | Susan | | |
| 2011 | Prosperity | Tang Aiming | | |
| 2011 | C.L.I.F. | Lin Huiyi | | |
| 2011 | A Song to Remember | Auntie Sweet Potato | | |
| 2012 | The Day It Rained on Our Parade | Liu Lili | | |
| 2012 | Poetic Justice | Tammy | | |
| 2013 | 96°C Café | Wang Xiufen | | |
| 2013 | Love At Risk | Peng Nana | | |
| 2013 | The Journey: A Voyage | Han Xiuxiang | | |
| 2014 | The Caregivers (MISSY 先生) | Du Xiaofeng | | |
| 2014 | In The Name of Love | Lu Yuchan | | |
| 2014 | Mata Mata 2 | Helen Wee | | |
| 2014 | 118 | Tang Sijia | | |
| 2016 | The Queen | Zhang Xiaofeng | | |
| 2016 | Peace & Prosperity | Ouyang Fengying | | |
| 2016 | Soul Reaper 勾魂使者 | Wang Ailing | | |
| 2016 | 118 II | Tang Sijia | | |
| 2017 | Home Truly | Ye Peixiang | | |
| 2017 | Eat Already? 2 | Sally | | |
| 2019 | I See You (看见看不见的你) | Sandi | | |
| 2020 | A Jungle Survivor 森林生存记 | Liu Xinya | | |
| 2020 | Mister Flower 花花公子 | Cindy | | |
| 2021 | Key Witness 关键证人 | Wang Meiru | | |
| 2021 | The Take Down 肃战肃绝 | Madam Fong | | |
| 2021 | The Peculiar Pawnbroker 人心鉴定师 | Adele Chan | | |
| 2022 | Home Again 多年后的全家福 | Li Qiqi | | |
| 2022 | I Want to be a Tow Kay 亲家冤家做头家 | Esther | | |
| 2022 | In Safe Hands | Wang Meiqi | | |
| 2022 | You Can Be an Angel 4 你也可以是天使4 | He Yilin | | |
| 2022 | Your World in Mine | Chen Linlin | | |
| 2022 | Soul Doctor 灵医 | Sergeant C | | |
| 2022 | Healing Heroes 医生不是神 | Yan Zhiqi | | |
| 2022 | Soul Detective | Sergeant C | | |
| 2023 | Shero | Jiang Meizhen | | |
| 2023 | Till the End | Youqing | | |
| 2024 | Born to Shine (孺子可教也) | Su Xinying | | |
| 2025 | Emerald Hill - The Little Nyonya Story (小娘惹之翡翠山) | Ping Jie | | |

=== Film ===
| Year | Title | Role | Notes | Ref. |
|---|---|---|---|---|
| 2023 | Don't Go Home Tonight | | | |

== Discography ==
=== Compilation albums ===
| Year | English title | Mandarin title | Ref |
|---|---|---|---|
| 2013 | MediaCorp Music Lunar New Year Album 13 | 群星贺岁金蛇献祥和 | |
| 2017 | MediaCorp Music Lunar New Year Album 17 | 新传媒群星咕鸡咕鸡庆丰年 | |

== Awards and nominations ==
| Year | Ceremony | Category | Nominated work | Result | Ref |
|---|---|---|---|---|---|
| 2000 | Star Awards | Best Newcomer | —N/a | Nominated | |
| 2003 | Star Awards | Top 10 Most Popular Female Artistes | —N/a | Nominated | |
| 2004 | Star Awards | Top 10 Most Popular Female Artistes | —N/a | Nominated | |
| 2006 | Star Awards | Top 10 Most Popular Female Artistes | —N/a | Nominated | |
| 2007 | Star Awards | Top 10 Most Popular Female Artistes | —N/a | Nominated | |
| 2010 | Star Awards | Top 10 Most Popular Female Artistes | —N/a | Nominated | |
| 2011 | Star Awards | Top 10 Most Popular Female Artistes | —N/a | Nominated | |
| 2012 | Star Awards | Top 10 Most Popular Female Artistes | —N/a | Nominated | |
| 2013 | Star Awards | Top 10 Most Popular Female Artistes | —N/a | Nominated | |
| 2014 | Star Awards | Rocket Award | —N/a | Won | |
| 2014 | Star Awards | Best Supporting Actress | The Journey: A Voyage | Nominated | |
| 2014 | Star Awards | Star Awards for Most Popular Regional Artiste (China) | —N/a | Nominated | |
| 2014 | Asian Television Awards | Best Actress in a Supporting Role | The Journey: A Voyage | Nominated | |
| 2015 | Star Awards | Top 10 Most Popular Female Artistes | —N/a | Nominated | |
| 2017 | Star Awards | Top 10 Most Popular Female Artistes | —N/a | Nominated | |
| 2022 | Star Awards | Top 10 Most Popular Female Artistes | —N/a | Nominated | |
| 2023 | Star Awards | Top 10 Most Popular Female Artistes | —N/a | Nominated | |
| 2023 | Star Awards | MYPICK! Most Hated Villain | Your World in Mine | Nominated | |
| 2025 | Star Awards | Top 10 Most Popular Female Artistes | —N/a | Nominated | |
