= Beatrice Looi =

Malaysian fashion designer

- Born: 15 April 1967 (age 58); Kuala Lumpur, Malaysia
- Occupations: Fashion designer; Image stylist
- Years active: 1990–present
- Awards: Top 10 Malaysian Bridal Gown Designers 2017; 16th BOH Cameronian Arts Awards 2019 (The Best Costume Design, Styling & Make Up - The Ring of The Nibelung)

Chinese name
- Traditional Chinese: 呂素君
- Simplified Chinese: 吕素君
- Hanyu Pinyin: Lǚ Sùjūn
- Jyutping: Leoi5 Sou3 Gwan1
- Hokkien POJ: Lī Sò͘-kun
- Tâi-lô: Lī Sòo-kun

Beatrice Looi (吕素君; born 15 April 1967) is a Malaysian fashion designer from Kuala Lumpur. She was named one of the Top 10 Malaysian Bridal Gown Designers in 2017. Her label Beatrice Looi Couture has been nominated as one of the Top Asian Bridal Designers by United Kingdom's Destination Wedding & Honeymoon Magazine. She was also named Malaysia's "Top 40, Under 40" by Le Prestige magazine for her achievement in the fashion industry.

Furthermore, she was appointed by Disney Malaysia as the only costume designer for an inspired collection in conjunction with the launch of the movie Beauty and The Beast in 2017. Her brand includes several fashion lines, couture, evening wear, after-five and bridal gowns etc.

== Early life ==
Beatrice Looi was born into a fashion family. Her mother taught her dressmaking, bringing a young Beatrice with her to shop for fabrics. Beatrice would spend time watching her mother sew and would collect the fabric scraps to clothe her dolls. Through this process, Beatrice learned the basics of making clothing and soon she was putting together her own outfits.

She cites Asia and Issey Miyake, Kansai Yamamoto as inspirations. Her signature style is all about detail. She uses fine lace, beads, pleats and plenty of flowing materials.

== Career ==
Looi decided to stop her studies in Kuen Cheng High School after form 2. She moved to her mother's dress-making workshop to further her ambition by designing and making casual wear, occasion attire and evening dresses for local boutiques, major departmental stores such as Metrojaya, Isetan and Parkson.

In 1999, she created her namesake label and Eternity, Elite and EDC by Beatrice Looi have existed since 1991.

Looi has worked with various brands. She was the stylist and costume designer for L'Oreal Professional Singapore in 2017, L'Oreal Professional Malaysia Style and Colour Trophy 2019, Estee Lauder Group, Shiseido, Lancome, M.A.C Cosmetics, Wycon Cosmetics, NYX Cosmetics etc.

In 2017, Looi was contacted by Disney Malaysia to collaborate as the only costume designer for an inspired collection for the launch of the movie Beauty and The Beast in 2017.

== Entertainment industry ==
Looi is also involved in the Malaysian entertainment industry. She was invited to participate in two Astro films WooHoo and Great Day as image consultant in which both were nominated for the Best Image Design in the Malaysia Golden Wau Awards in 2013.

Looi was also appointed as Image Stylist / Costume Designer for stage plays and musical such as "Modern Grand Hotel" (2017), "A Period" (2018), "Dragonland" (2018), "The Ring of The Nibelung" (2018), "Rasa Melaka" (2019), "The Story of Ah Loy" (2019), "Thunderstorm" (2019), and "Mr. Noisy – Don’t Let Joe & Faridah Know" (2019). She has won The Best Costume Designer for the stage play entitled "Kopi Susu" in 2016. In the same year, she created 108 sets "Peranakan" inspired costumes for the longest running stage play "Nyonya Memoir" in Malaysia ever. In addition, she won the Best Costume Design, Styling & Make Up award for the stage play "The Ring of The Nibelung" at the 16th BOH Cameronian Arts Awards in 2019.

Looi has many collaboration with local and overseas artistes. In 2016, she was appointed by Hong Kong actress Nancy Wu to be her fashion mentor for TVB program. In 2017, she was invited and appointed by Taiwan artiste Vanness Wu as fashion designer for his Project S.A.L.T in Sydney.
