= The Glittering Days =

- 星光灿烂
- Starring: Felicia Chin; Mimi Kung; William San; Jeffrey Cheng
- Opening theme: 要幸福啊 by Joi Chua
- Countries of origin: Malaysia; Singapore
- Original language: Mandarin
- No. of episodes: 30

Production
- Running time: 60 minutes (approx.)

Original release
- Network: ntv7 (Malaysia); MediaCorp Channel 8 (Singapore)
- Release: 20 April – 9 June 2010

The Glittering Days is the 17th co-production of MediaCorp TV and ntv7. It will be aired every Monday to Thursday, at 10:00 pm on Malaysia's ntv7 starting 4 April 2010. It stars Felicia Chin, Mimi Kung, William San & Jeffrey Cheng as casts of this series. It was later shown on MediaCorp Channel 8 in Singapore from 18 February to 29 March 2013 on weekdays at 7 pm. This series was repeated on weekends 4:30 pm in 2014 and Sundays at 12 pm in 2020.

== Cast ==
- Felicia Chin as Xu Wen Hui
- Mimi Kung as Su Xiao Xiao
- William San as Su Qing Yun
- Chris Tong as Chen Bo Li
- Jeffrey Cheng as Huang Da Wei

== See also ==
- List of The Glittering Days episodes
