= Friends Forever (TV series) =

- 我爱麻糍
- Starring: Tracy Lee; Julian Hee; Melvin Sia; Andie Chen; Tiffany Leong
- Countries of origin: Malaysia; Singapore
- Original language: Mandarin
- No. of episodes: 12

Production
- Running time: approx. 45 minutes

Original release
- Network: ntv7 (Malaysia); MediaCorp Channel 8 (Singapore)
- Release: 13 January 2010 – 2010

Related
- Timeless Season; Glowing Embers

Friends Forever is a Singaporean-Malaysian produced dramedy series. It stars Tracy Lee, Julian Hee, Melvin Sia, Andie Chen & Tiffany Leong as the casts of the series. It features both Singaporean and Malaysian actors and is the 16th international co-production of MediaCorp TV (Singapore) and ntv7 (Malaysia). The Chinese title (我爱麻糍 wo ai ma zi) refers to "muar chee" (zh), a popular sticky rice cake, and alludes to how friendship binds together a group of individuals.

== Cast ==
- Tracy Lee 李美玲 as Amy 李静华
- Julian Hee 许立桦 as Lung 林志龙
- Melvin Sia 谢佳见 as Derek 陈迪克
- Andie Chen 陈邦鋆 as Jeff 石健明
- Tiffany Leong 梁丽芳 as Funny 蔡若楠
- Kyo Chen 庄仲维 as Bill 刘俊標
- Moo Yan Yee 巫恩仪 as Ruby 张慧君
- Chew Sin Huey 石欣卉 as Yoyo 陈子珊
- Hishiko Woo
- Alvin Wong
