= Welcome Home, My Love =

- 快乐一家
- Genre: Modern Drama
- Starring: Ho Kwai Lam; Steve Yap; Tiffany Leong; Leslie Chai; Apple Hong; Adam Chen; Zhu Mi Mi; Mayjune Tan; Chris Tong
- Ending theme: Xin Fu Cai Hong
- Countries of origin: Malaysia; Singapore
- Original language: Chinese
- No. of episodes: 25

Production
- Running time: 60 minutes (approx.)

Original release
- Network: ntv7 (Malaysia); MediaCorp Channel 8 (Singapore)
- Release: 18 May – 25 June 2009

Welcome Home, My Love
- Simplified Chinese: 快乐一家
Transcriptions

Welcome Home, My Love (Chinese: 快乐一家) is a Mandarin Chinese episodic drama produced jointly by Malaysian broadcaster Media Prima Berhad and Singaporean broadcaster MediaCorp TV. This drama serial consists of 25 episodes. It was the 14th joint production between the two companies, although the story lines are set in the suburbs of Kuala Lumpur, Malaysia. It airs every Monday to Thursday, at 10:00 pm on ntv7. It also screened in Singapore on 5 October 2009 and ended on 6 November 2009 on every weekday night at 7:00 pm. Filmed in the Klang Valley area of Kuala Lumpur for three months from late October 2008, the 25-episode series brings together cast members from Malaysia, Hong Kong and Singapore.

== Cast ==
=== The Jiang family ===
Cast	Role	Description
Ho Kwai Lam	Jiang Zhen Min	Father of 4 children
Steve Yap	Jiang Bo Wen	Eldest son Vivien's husband Loan Department Manager, later promoted to General Manager
Tiffany Leong	Jiang Jia Ning	Eldest daughter Ken's wife TV Studio Executive Producer; Gave birth to a son at the last episode
Leslie Chai	Jiang Bo Cong	Younger son Wan Qin's husband An assistant in a travel agency, later retrenched A business partner in a toy model retail store
Mayjune Tan	Jiang Jia Tong	Younger daughter College student

=== Other cast ===
Cast	Role	Description
Zhu Mi Mi	Guo Chunmei	Ken's aunt
Apple Hong	Vivien Tan Huey Yan	Jiang Bo Wen's wife
Adam Chen	Ken Guo	Jiang Jia Ning's husband A photographer
Chris Tong (Tong Bing Yu)	Zhang Wan Qin	Jiang Bo Cong's wife
Chen Puie Kong	Jiang Zhen Dong	Min's younger brother

== Synopsis ==
Nowadays, the young and ambitious focus on the pursuit of their goals and achieve successes at the expense of their families. Yet, when the going gets tough, people realise that nothing beats having the affectionate support and warm encouragement of one's own family.

The series, Welcome Home, My Love tries to reflect, in a light-hearted manner, the process of rekindling long-forgotten family bonds. The family drama demonstrates conflicts and contradictions between traditional and modern values as it deals with various social issues such as materialism, unemployment, late marriage, irresponsible parenting, extramarital affairs and divorce.

The heart-warming tale of modern city life revolves around the working-class Jiang family headed by a conservative widowed father with traditional values who dotes on his four children.

== Characters ==
=== Jiang family ===
At the core of the family is retired magazine chief editor Jiang Zhen Min (Ho Kwai Lam) who single-handedly brought up his children after his wife's demise some 20 years ago.

To fulfil his wife's dying wish, Zhen Min tries his best to provide his children with much love. However, they soon begin to pursue their own paths in life and a gap gradually grows between the father and his adult children.

- Jiang Bo Wen - His eldest son Bo Wen (Steve Yap) is secretly planning to migrate with his wife Vivien (Apple Hong) and their 10-year-old son. He sells his condominium and moves in with his father on the pretext of letting his son keep his grandfather company. Bo Wen and his wife work in the same bank. Trouble brews when he is suspected of having an affair with his superior and he nearly goes bankrupt playing the stock market.
- Jiang Bo Cong - The younger son, Bo Cong (Leslie Chai), finally becomes a father after years of marriage but the couple's happiness is short-lived when he loses his job. Wan Qin (Chris Tong), who works in an electronics distribution company, becomes the family's breadwinner while the indecisive Bo Cong becomes a househusband. Their financial woes soon drives a wedge into their relationship as he is also suspected of having an affair.
- Jiang Jia Ning - Zhen Min's older daughter Jia Ning (Tiffany Leong) is a talented executive producer in a TV station who seems inclined to singlehood after a failed relationship. In the show, her days brighten up when she eventually meets Ken (Adam Chen), a photographer at her company who had returned from the US. After a whirlwind romance they settle down. The newly-weds are not eager to have a baby yet, but their meddling aunt (Chu Mi Mi) from Penang gives them an earful about the joys of parenthood.
- Jiang Jia Tong - Youngest daughter Jia Tong (Mayjune Tan) is the apple of her father's eye. A happy-go-lucky college student, Jia Tong loves to eat cake and her dream is to open a pastry shop. Due to poor health during her childhood years, homebody Jia Tong is her father's constant companion and she also cooks the family's meals. Unfortunately, she falls for the wrong guy and suffers a major emotional setback. Through the course of the series, viewers will enjoy the tender moments when the family members offer love, support and encouragement to each other when they face the trials of life.

== Airing dates ==
Country	Aired (First episode)	End (Final episode)
Malaysia	18 May 2009	29 June 2009
Singapore	October 5, 2009	November 6, 2009
