= Where the Heart Is (2008 TV series) =

- 大城情事
- Genre: Family
- Starring: Zhang Yaodong; Priscelia Chan; Stella Chung; Zen Chong; Tiffany Leong; Freeman Woo
- Opening theme: 回到原点 by Stella Chung
- Countries of origin: Malaysia; Singapore
- Original language: Chinese
- No. of episodes: 30

Production
- Running time: 60 minutes (approx.)

Original release
- Network: ntv7 (Malaysia); MediaCorp Channel 8 (Singapore)
- Release: 11 February – 7 March 2008

Related
- My Home Affairs 家事 (2000)

Where The Heart Is (Chinese: 大城情事) is a Chinese drama which was co-produced by Media Prima Berhad and MediaCorp TV. It was screened on every weekday night, 9:45 pm. It was telecasted on Malaysia's ntv7 channel and later, was telecasted on Singapore's free-to-air channel, MediaCorp Channel 8. This drama serial consists of 30 episodes. In Singapore, it made its debut on 23 September 2008 and ended on 3 November 2008, and was screened on every weekday night at 7:00 pm.

This drama is a remake of the 2000 TCS drama My Home Affairs (家事), which starred Zoe Tay, Tay Ping Hui, Evelyn Tan, Aileen Tan, Xiang Yun, and Chen Guohua.

== Synopsis ==
Set in the busy suburbs of Kuala Lumpur, the story revolves around the Hong family: Hong Quan and his wife Ping and their three sons and two daughters. Together, husband and wife run a bakery-cum-cafe with their first daughter-in-law.

Jiawen is the oldest son and child and works as a contractor. Timid ("kiasee" 怕死) by nature, the 35-year-old is often at odds with his wife Ah Ling over money, amongst many other issues, but is kind and compassionate by nature. Unfortunately his kindness towards an employee was misinterpreted by his wife as sexual interest.

Shuxian, the second child and older daughter, has her own business and seems to have finally found her beau at age 30. She had vowed not to marry after getting dumped by her fiancé on the eve of their wedding. Husband Siyu seems like a perfect match but their marriage goes down the drain once they settle down.

Second son Jiakang, 29, works as a manager and is happily married to Feng Yuhan, a hotel public relations manager. Both are high-flyers in their respective work places but it soon poses a problem to their marriage. The timid Jiakang has to contend with a domineering secretary who takes pleasure in taking advantage of him. Yuhan previously had an abortion as it interfered with her work, which devastated her husband. He confides in Yao Shanshan, a colleague, who is kind and gentle by nature. Before long, he finds himself unable to choose between the two women.

Youngest son Jiajun, 26, is the most intelligent and was exceptionally gifted academically as a student. He was old friends with Yuhan and had a secret crush on her but has accepted the fact that she is now his second sister-in-law. After graduating from university, he got a well-paid job in the financial sector but is unappreciated by his unpopular and arrogant boss. The final straw came when his boss used his proposal without permission and passed it off as his own without giving Jiajun credit and was even praised by their superiors. Angered, Jiajun decided that he had enough and vowed that he would climb up the ladder on his own by hook or by crook.

The baby of the family, 23-year-old Shuhui, is free-spirited and often deems her parents too old-fashioned. She ran away from home after quarrelling with her parents. Unfortunately she lands herself into trouble after having an affair with her married boss and word got out. The incident drove a wedge between her and her domineering first sister-in-law Ah Ling.

As the five siblings go about their separate lives, they all soon discover that indeed, there is no place like home.

== Cast ==
- Priscelia Chan as Feng Yuhan
- Zhang Yaodong as Hong Jiakang
- Stella Chung as Yao Shanshan
- Zen Chong as Hong Jiajun
- Tiffany Leong as Wu Jinhua
- Jane Ng Meng Hui as Hong Shuhui
- Huang Zhiqiang as Hong Jiawen
- Tong Xin as Hong Shuxian
- Freeman Woo as Shi Yu
- Zhou Quan Xi
- Lin Wei Fen
