= Falling in Love (TV series) =

- 情有可缘
- Music by: 单身潜逃 by Penny Tai
- Countries of origin: Singapore; Malaysia
- Original language: Mandarin

Production
- Running time: approx. 45 minutes

Original release
- Release: 20 August – 21 September 2007

Related
- The Beginning; Man Of The House

Falling In Love (Chinese: 情有可缘) is a Singaporean and Malaysian co-production Chinese drama which is being telecast on Singapore's free-to-air channel, MediaCorp TV Channel 8. It made its debut on 20 August 2007 and ended its run on 21 September 2007. The drama consists of a total of 25 episodes. It was screened on every weekday night, 7 pm. It was also telecast in 2006, on Malaysia's NTV7 channel.

== Cast ==
- Zhang Yaodong as Tom Hang Hao Ran
- Jesseca Liu as Zheng Zi Hui
- Henry Heng as Zheng Fu Rong
- Eunice Ng as Zheng Zi Shan
- William San as Herman Hang Hao Xiang
- Alan Yun as Wang Li Zhe
- Phyllis Sim as Zheng Zi Si (Alice)

== Synopsis ==
Zheng Fu Rong (Henry Heng) is a chef in a Chinese restaurant. His cooking skills are extraordinary and he is a kind-hearted man. Because his wife died early, he has taken on the roles of both mum and dad to his three precious daughters. A responsible and do-it-all father, he is comforted and happy that his daughters are all filial to him. Like all parents, Fu Rong looks forward to the day his children find wedded bliss. However, not a single one of his three daughters is in a stable relationship, which worries him greatly.

Fu Rong's three princesses differ very much in character. The eldest, Zi Shan (Eunice Ng) is blessed with both looks and talent. She is a capable young lady working as creative director for an advertising firm. Zi Shan believes that love is secondary. On top of that, she is one who knows how to enjoy life, and thus is not on the lookout for a life partner.

Zi Shan has an arch-enemy in the company, Herman (William San). They are at loggerheads with each other and are always fighting over work. Outside of work, relations aren't any better as well because of differences in character. Zi Shan keeps up an elegant and ladylike grace at all times, except when she runs into Herman and loses her cool.

Zi Shan bumps into an old boyfriend (portrayed by Wee Kheng Ming), and sparks fly between them. After seeing him for some time, she discovers that he is a married man. Zi Shan confronts him, only to have him shamelessly suggest that since they are both adults, they should be able to enjoy an affair free of responsibility. His intention is to keep Zi Shan on the side as a lover. Zi Shan is furious and extremely hurt.

Second daughter, Zi Hui (Jesseca Liu) is an entertainment producer in a broadcasting station. She is sensitive and kind, and has her own unique viewpoints. It is a pity she is rather tomboyish and unladylike in her appearance. Thus, she has never gone far in the relationship and love department. She longs to be in love and actively takes part in matchmaking programmes. However, her straightforward nature and boyish dressing has scared off potential partners.

After some time, Zi Hui gets to know the man of her dreams, Wang Li Zhe (Alan Yun), a successful jewellery businessman. The gentlemanly Li Zhe treats her with respect, as he does with all women, but Zi Hui mistakes it as an expression of love and concern for her as a girlfriend. This is because she has never been cared for by a man before. She even makes an exception and dresses herself up for Li Zhe. When the air is cleared and Zi Hui discovers that she was just imagining things, she is heartbroken. Fortunately, she has the support of a loving family and her good friend, Tom (Zhang Yaodong), and pulls through the difficult period. Tom, who used to crack jokes about Zi Hui's appearance, begins to appreciate her after many ups and downs, and starts to fall in love with her.

The youngest daughter, Zi Si (Phyllis Sim), is a pretty babe who has just graduated from university. Pampered by her father and sisters since she was young, she has grown into a beautiful young lady who is always surrounded by men trying to please her. Because she has been spoilt by her family, she is undeniably stubborn and wilful. She also throws tantrums now and then. Since she is blessed with good looks, a glib tongue and is also quite quick-witted, Zi Si's life in all aspects is going pretty well. Later on, Zi Si falls for Li Zhe who reciprocates her feelings. However, her spoilt nature as well as her modern behaviour gets on the nerves of her future mother-in-law, Ou Yang Ling Ling who tries to stage certain events to make the young couple break up.

Zheng Fu Rong cares not just for his three daughters, but also his disciples at the restaurant. During a retrenchment exercise, he offers to resign of his own free will so that his disciples can keep their jobs. However, the life of a retiree is extremely boring. Anxious about his daughters not being able to find good husbands, he cannot help but interfere with their personal lives sometimes. This causes some family disputes, and the straightforward Zi Si falls out with her father. She even refuses to resolve the issue with him. Fu Rong suddenly collapses and is admitted into hospital. His life may be in danger.

== Viewership ==
Week	Date	Average Number of audience in 5 weekdays (Round off to nearest thousand)
Week 1	20 August 2007 to 24 August 2007	473, 000
Week 2	27 August 2007 to 31 August 2007	480, 000
Week 3	3 September 2007 to 7 September 2007	508, 000
Week 4	10 September 2007 to 14 September 2007	524, 000
Week 5	17 September 2007 to 21 September 2007	537, 000

== Trivia ==
- This is the second Chinese drama to result from the signed three years collaboration for joint production of Chinese dramas and variety shows between Malaysia's Media Prima Berhad and Singapore's MediaCorp Studios Pte Ltd.
- This show is a remake of a 2005 MediaCorp drama series, You Are The One (二分之一缘分), though the cast is different but the plot is the same. However, there are still some changes in the plot.
