= Man of the House (TV series) =

Singaporean television series

- 男人当家
- Starring: Li Wenhai; Vincent Ng; Alan Tern; Wang Yuqing; Eelyn Kok; Janelle Chin; Phyllis Sim
- Opening theme: "Huo Gu" by A-do
- Ending theme: "Zi You Bu Bia" by JJ Lin
- Countries of origin: Malaysia; Singapore
- Original language: Mandarin

Original release
- Network: ntv7, MediaCorp Channel 8
- Release: 2007

Related
- Falling in Love; The Beautiful Scent

Man of the House (Chinese: 男人当家) is a Singaporean Chinese modern family drama broadcast on Malaysia's free-to-air channel NTV7. It made its debut on 3 May 2007.

== Synopsis ==
Shengli seems to have led a perfect and diligent life and retires from his job only to discover his wife is determined to divorce him and all his sons are facing relationship problems of their own. It is now up to the men to straighten things out.

== Cast and characters ==
- Li Wenhai as Zhen Shengli
- Jess Teong as Zhou Huijing
- Wang Yuqing as Li Hongru
- Vincent Ng as Zhen Jianyi
- Janelle Chin as Wang Shuxian
- Lynn Lim as Fang Wen
- Alan Tern as Zhen Jian'er
- Phyllis Sim as Li Lizhen
- Tiffany Leong as Joe
- Coby Chong as Zhen Jiansan
- Eelyn Kok as Tan Yimin
