= The Beginning (TV series) =

Singaporean TV series

- 原点
- Genre: Modern Drama
- Starring: Rynn Lim; Felicia Chin; Shaun Chen; Stella Chung; William San; Melvin Sia
- Opening theme: 空秋千 (Empty Swing) by Rynn Lim
- Ending theme: 主题曲 (Theme Song) by Rynn Lim
- Countries of origin: Singapore; Malaysia
- Original language: Chinese
- No. of episodes: 30

Original release
- Network: ntv7 (Malaysia); MediaCorp Channel 8 (Singapore)
- Release: 16 October – 24 November 2006

Related
- Rising Expectation

The Beginning (Chinese: 原点, literally "The Point of Origin") is a 30-episode Mandarin Chinese episodic drama produced jointly by Singaporean broadcaster MediaCorp TV and Malaysian broadcaster Media Prima Berhad. It was the first joint production between the two companies, and is a remake of the 1997 Television Corporation of Singapore (now MediaCorp) drama Rising Expectations.

== Plot ==
The story centres on the struggles of two of the three main characters of the series: Fang Yucheng and Shi Jianing. Shi Jianing was born in a moderately rich family, but her father, Shi Dongqing, abandoned the family to seek greater wealth by marrying a rich woman, even when his first wife was gravely ill. Jianing, faced with the loss of her mother, hated her father ever since, and vowed to exact revenge, especially after her father, upon orders from his domineering second wife, ran her over with a car, and later went to jail on assault (the charge was trumped up by the second wife). The death of her sister, Jiamin, also spurred her to exact revenge.

Jianing eventually succeeded in destroying her father's business empire after her discovery that her father's company, Syarikat Ma (Ma Corporation), succeeded in getting listed on the Stock Exchange after committing accounting fraud. Shi Dongqing's family went broke overnight, while his second wife suffered a stroke after she went to Jianing's house to attack her. Successful as it was, Jianing's revenge came at a cost: her friend, Tie Dongliang's father, was accidentally murdered by an accountant of the now defunct Ma Corporation, who provided Jianing with the evidence of the fraud and was now ruined. This severely damaged her relations with Tie Dongliang, with whom she had an on-and-off love relationship. Jianing only let go of her anger for her father after he and his second wife were killed by Jay Fang.

The second arc focused on Fang Yucheng, who lost his father in an accident early in his life. He vowed to attain great wealth, going to no ends to achieve them, even working for the man who was responsible for his father's death: Fang Huakang.

In the end, the drive for revenge and wealth had ruined many person's lives, and all the characters realised that they can return to a happier time when they return to where they started.

== Cast ==
=== Shi family ===
- Shi Dongqing (石东清) - Father of Jianing, Jiamin, and Tingli (from a later marriage). He abandoned Jianing, Jiamin, and their mother to expand his business empire, marrying a rich woman while tolerating the condescending and abusive behaviours of the woman. He and his wife went bankrupt after the dodgy financial dealings of their company were exposed by Jianing, and were eventually killed by Jay Fang.

=== First Shi Family ===
- Shi Jianing (石嘉宁, portrayed by Felicia Chin) - A fish stall operator at a local bazaar. She is called "Grouper Maid" (石斑妹) by her friends. Her father, in the pursuit of wealth, abandoned her when she was young, which generated much hate between the two persons, not helped by a grave misunderstanding that led Jianing to believe that her father attempted to have sex with her sister, Shi Jiamin. She was framed by Ma Lilian, who has long harboured hate towards Jianing and Jiamin, for assaulting Shi Dongqing, and was sent to prison as a result. After her release, Jianing worked hard to uncover the dodgy financial dealings of Shi Dongqing's company, the Syarikat Ma, which led to the collapse of Syarikat Ma, and her father's bankruptcy.
- Shi Jiamin (石嘉敏)- The younger sister of Jianing. Due to the lack of supervision, she turned bad, and was eventually murdered by Jay Fang.

=== Second Shi Family ===
- Ma Lilian (马丽莲) - Mother of Ting Li. She came from a rich family, and built the Syarikat Ma (马氏集团) from the ground up. She is a domineering figure, tolerating no dissent to her orders, and treats her husband, Shi Dong Qing, quite badly. Her relations with Shi Dong Qing's estranged family were bad, and her demeanors towards Shi Jia Ning eventually led Jia Ning to exact revenge, bankrupting Ma and her husband. Both were later killed by Jay Fang.
- Shi Tingli (石婷立, portrayed by Stella Chung) - A medical student at the university, her life is controlled by her domineering mother, who wanted her to work at Syarikat Ma, when in fact, Tingli wanted to be a psychiatrist. She befriended Jianing, who, unbeknownst to her, is her elder sister. She was raped by Jay Fang, with whom she had a relationship before.

=== Fang family ===
- Fang Huakang (方华康, portrayed by Zhang Wei) - An elderly businessman, who is the founder of Hua Kang Berhad (华康集团). His ascent to wealth has been tainted by selling fake medicines and deaths of one of his relatives, who was Fang Yucheng's father.
- Fang Yucheng (方宇诚, portrayed by Shaun Chen) - An educated professional who is on good terms with Dongliang and Jianing. He works for, and is related to, Fang Huakang, who had a hand in his father's death. Despite that, Yucheng, in pursuit of wealth, remain at Hua Kang Berhad.
- Fang Zhiyang (方志扬 portrayed by Johnson Lee)- The eldest son of the Fang Family. His pursuit for wealth led him and his other brother, Fang Zhirong, to hatch a kidnapping plot on their father. Is married to Rachel (Kirby Chan), who had an affair with Yucheng.
- Fang Zhirong (portrayed by Melvin Sia)- The 2nd son of Fang Huakang.
- Jay Fang Zhijie (方志杰, portrayed by William San)- Returned to Malaysia after recently graduating abroad. Unbeknownst to all, he is mentally ill, and exacts revenge on women through rape and murder. He murdered Shi Jiamin, but was acquitted by the court. He also raped Shi Tingli, and murdered her parents. He was accidentally killed by Fang Yucheng.

=== Other ===
- Tie Dongliang (铁栋梁, portrayed by Rynn Lim) - A young man whose hot-headed demeanors earned him the title "Iron Head" (铁头). He, along with Jianing and Yucheng, are the central three characters in the entire series.

== Production ==
Filming started at Malaysia in April 2006.

== Release ==
Aired (First episode)	Country	End (Final episode)
16 October 2006	Malaysia	24 November 2006
8 May 2007	Singapore	18 June 2007

== Reception ==
=== Viewership ratings ===
This drama series has recorded one of the lowest viewership ratings to date in Singapore, while recording the highest ratings in Malaysia.

Week	Date	Average Number of audience in 5 weekdays (Round off to nearest thousand)
Week 1	8 May 2007 to 11 May 2007	410, 000
Week 2	14 May 2007 to 18 May 2007	400, 000
Week 3	21 May 2007 to 25 May 2007	402, 000
Week 4	28 May 2007 to 1 June 2007	413, 000
Week 5	4 June 2007 to 8 June 2007	386, 000
Week 6	11 June 2007 to 15 June 2007	388, 000
Last episode	18 June 2007	450, 000

== See also ==
- List of programmes broadcast by Mediacorp Channel 8
