= 2010 Golden Awards =

Golden Awards 2010 金视奖2010
- Date: 25 September 2010
- Country: Malaysia
- Presented by: Bryan Wong; Cheryl Lee

Television/radio coverage
- Network: ntv7
- Related: Golden Awards

The 2010 Golden Awards was an awards ceremony held in Malaysia. It is the inaugural ceremony and was held at the Putrajaya International Convention Centre in Putrajaya. The list of nominees was published in July and the ceremony took place in September. The show was hosted by 988 FM radio DJ Cheryl Lee and Singaporean host and actor Bryan Wong. A special episode called "Golden Awards Prelude" featuring the nominees from each category was aired on ntv7 during the weeks leading up to the ceremony.

Guest presenters and performers include Quan Yi Fong, Wu Jiahui, Nicholas Teo, Fish Leong, Jamii Szmadzinski, Sam Lee, Aarif Rahman and Godfrey Gao.

== Professionally Judged Awards ==
=== Drama Category ===
==== Best Drama Serial 最佳电视剧 ====
- The Iron Lady (女头家)
- Goodnight DJ (声空感应)
- Romantic Delicacies (美食厨师男)
- Age of Glory (情牵南苑)
- Love 18 (逆风18)

==== Best Actor 最佳男主角 ====
- Steve Yap 叶良财 - Welcome Home, My Love (快乐一家)
- Chen Huen Phuei 曾宏辉 - Goodnight DJ (声空感应)
- Wee Kheng Ming 黄启铭 - The Thin Line (还我情真)
- Melvin Sia 谢佳见 - Romantic Delicacies (美食厨师男)
- Zzen Zhang 章缜翔 - The Thin Line (还我情真)

==== Best Actress 最佳女主角 ====
- Aenie Wong 王淑君 - The Iron Lady (女头家)
- Debbie Goh 吴天瑜 - Age of Glory (情牵南苑)
- Apple Hong 洪乙心 - Love is All Around (爱在你左右)
- Yeo Yann Yann 杨雁雁 - The Iron Lady (女头家)
- Jesseca Liu 刘芷绚 - Romantic Delicacies (美食厨师男)

==== Best Supporting Actor 最佳男配角 ====
- Alvin Wong 王骏 - Exclusive (独家追辑)
- Ernest Chong 张顺源 - Exclusive (独家追辑)
- Frederick Lee 李洺中 - Age of Glory (情牵南苑)
- Jordan Voon 温绍平 - The Iron Lady (女头家)
- William San 辛伟廉 - Lion.Hearts (谈谈情,舞舞狮)

==== Best Supporting Actress 最佳女配角 ====
- Seck Fook Yee 释福如 - The Iron Lady (女头家)
- 梁书造 - My Kampong Days (家在半山芭)
- 林亦廷 - My Kampong Days (家在半山芭)
- Jane Ng 黃明慧 - The Thin Line (还我情真)
- Stella Chung 钟晓玉 - The Thin Line (还我情真)

==== Best Newcomer 最佳新晋演员 ====
- Hishiko 吴佩其 - The Iron Lady (女头家)
- Yise Loo 罗忆诗 - Goodnight DJ (声空感应)
- Tracy Lee 李美玲 - The Thin Line (还我情真)
- Jamie 朱健美 - Love is Not Blind (乐语思情)
- Henley Hii 许亮宇 - Step of Dance (眉飛色舞)

==== Best Drama Theme Song 最佳电视剧主题曲 ====
- The Iron Lady (女头家)
- Fallen Angel (天使的烙印)
- Age of Glory (情牵南苑)
- Love 18 (逆风18)
- Exclusive (独家追辑)

=== Non-drama Category ===
==== Best Variety Programme ====
- Deal or No Deal Malaysia (Chinese version) 一掷千金
- Double Triple Or Nothing 贰叁零之役
- Double Triple Or Nothing – Kids
- Project Superstar Malaysia (Season 3) 绝对SuperStar 3
- Ultimate Power Group (season 1) 终极天团

==== Best Reality Programme Host ====
- Cheryl Lee 李欣怡 - Project Superstar Malaysia 3 (绝对Superstar)

==== Best Variety and Entertainment Programme ====
- Double Triple Or Nothing

==== Best Variety and Entertainment Programme Host 最佳综艺娱乐节目主持人 ====
- Owen Yap 叶剑锋 - Deal Or No Deal (season 2) (一掷千金)

== Awards Eligible for Audience Voting ==
=== Most Popular Actor ===
- Chen Huen Phuei 曾宏辉
- Steve Yap 叶良财
- Zzen Zhang 章缜翔
- Wee Kheng Ming 黄启铭
- Huang Zhiqiang 黄志强
- Melvin Sia 谢佳见
- Shaun Chen 陈泓宇
- Foo Chee Kin 傅志坚
- Monday Kang 江伟翰
- Jeffrey Cheng 庄惟翔
- Henley Hii 许亮宇

=== Most Popular Actress ===
- Yeo Yann Yann 杨雁雁
- Jesseca Liu 刘芷绚
- Debbie Goh 吴天瑜
- Aenie Wong 王淑君
- Apple Hong 洪乙心
- Ong Ai Leng 王爱玲
- Cai Peixuan 蔡佩璇
- Yise Loo 罗忆诗
- Hishiko 吴姵琪
- Angie 萧佩莹
- Tracy Lee 李美玲
- Mayjune Tan 陈美君
- Emily Lim 林佩琪
- Jamie 朱健美

=== Most Popular Drama ===
- The Iron Lady (女头家)

=== Most Popular TV Host/Presenter ===
- Gary Yap 叶俊岑

== Special awards ==
=== Lifetime Achievement Award 金视辉煌成就奖 ===
- Lai Meng 黎明
