= Injustice (Malaysian TV series) =

- From left, Alan Yun, William San, Chris Tong, Wee Kheng Ming, Tiffany Leong, Zen Chong, Soo Wincci, Emily Lim
- 血蝴蝶
- Directed by: Kok Tzyy Haw
- Starring: Tiffany Leong; Chris Tong; Emily Lim; Soo Wincci; William San; Wee Kheng Ming; Alan Yun; Zen Chong
- Opening theme: 《断翅的蝴蝶》 sung by Meeia Foo
- Countries of origin: Malaysia; Singapore
- Original language: Mandarin
- No. of episodes: 25

Production
- Running time: 60 minutes (approx.)

Original release
- Network: ntv7 (Malaysia)
- Release: 23 August – 4 October 2010

Related
- Age Of Glory 2; Unriddle Mystique Valley

Injustice (血蝴蝶) is the 18th international co-production of MediaCorp TV and ntv7. It was aired every Monday to Thursday, at 10:00pm on Malaysian Chinese language channel ntv7. This drama started airing on 23 August and ended on 4 October 2010. This will be the third Malaysian series to be screened on Channel U after The Thin Line and Addicted to Love when it debuts on 9 Nov 2012, weekdays at 6 pm.

== Synopsis ==
Jian Shuman (Tiffany Leong) had a tough childhood growing up with a mentally-ill mother amid hardship and poverty after witnessing her father's tragic death from a fall which is believed to be caused by Zhao Shilin, boss of Zhao Ming Tea Company. Shuman and her friend Jingchun (Emily Lim) find work at the Zhao family's tea company in the sales department after catching the management's eye.

Shuman's childhood friend Lin Shunyuan (Zzen Zhang) is head of the packing and production department. By chance, he meets the spoiled Yutian (Chris Tong, the Zhaos' only daughter, and their relationship gets of on a disastrous start with both becoming each other's sworn enemies. After visiting her father's tea plantations in the Cameron Highlands, she begins to take life more seriously and stops treating Shunyuan like an enemy. She befriends Shuman and Jingchun and the trio become best friends. Shuman, who has been nursing a grudge against Zhao Shilin all these years, senses her chance to take revenge. To complicate things, a love triangle forms between her, Yutian and Shunyuan.

Zhao Shilin's second son Yufan (William San) is reckless and ambitious. Their relationship is strained as Shilin tended to favour Yufan's more prudent older brother Yusen (Alan Yun). Yufan met Shuman and eventually he fell in love with her. Shuman, who had mutual feelings for Shunyuan, instead agrees to marry Yufan in order to take revenge on the Zhaos.

Shuman puts her plan of revenge into action. After sabotaging the tea products, she killed her sister-in-law Rebecca by pushing her to death in an old building and did everything to hide her identity as a murderer with the help of Zhao Ming employee He Zhenghao (Wee Kheng Ming). However, Zhenghao decided to back out and blackmails Shuman. Afraid Zhenghao would talk, she sabotages his car brakes and he is killed in a car accident. Customers accuse Zhao Ming of selling poor quality products and the health inspectors are called in. The proceeding incidents were too much for Zhao Shilin and he suffers a serious stroke and becomes paralysed as a result. Even her best friend Jingchun, Zhenghao's sister, is not spared as Shuman tried to silence her but Jingchun survived the attack. After a series of incidents, Mrs Zhao, Yusen and Yutian all begin to suspect Shuman.

The turning point came when Yutian and her mother brought Zhao Shilin to the park. While Yutian went to buy ice cream for them, Shuman pushes Zhao Shilin's wheelchair into the path of an oncoming car. Mrs Zhao is killed while trying to save her husband. From then on, Yutian hated Shuman. Yufan still refused to believe that Shuman caused all the havoc. He went to ask several witnesses and was deeply shaken to find out that his mother and siblings' suspicions about Shuman were indeed true.

Moreover, Zhao Ming has been cleared by the health inspectors and business is back on track. Shunyuan and Yutian become engaged and are happily planning for their future. Unable to accept the turnaround of events, Shuman gets intense with her plans to take revenge on the Zhao family. One day, Jingchun's father, who was old friends and business partners with Zhao Shilin and Shuman's father, meets Shuman with some shocking information that sends her reeling.

== Cast ==
=== Zhao Family ===
Cast	Role	Description
Phua Chee Kin	Zhao Shilin 赵世麟	Head of the Zhao family Shuman and Rebecca's father-in-law Boss of Zhao Ming Tea Company
Shirley Yu	Li Peipei 李姵姵	Zhao Shilin's wife Yusen, Yufan and Yutian's mother
Alan Yun	Zhao Yusen 赵语森	Eldest child in Zhao family Rebecca's husband
Soo Wincci	Rebecca Wang Shunyi 汪舜颐	Yusen's wife
William San	Zhao Yufan 赵语凡	Second child in Zhao family Shu Man's husband
Tiffany Leong	Jian Shuman 简舒曼	Yufan's wife Jingchun, Yutian and Shunyuan's best friend
Chris Tong	Zhao Yutian 赵语恬	Youngest in Zhao family Shunyuan's fiancée

=== Other cast ===
Cast	Role	Description
Zen Chong	Lin Shunyuan 林顺源	Yutian's fiancée Shuman's neighbour and childhood friend
Wee Kheng Ming	He Zhenghao 贺政豪	Jingchun's older brother Employee at Zhao Ming
Emily Lim	He Jingchun 贺靖淳	Zhenghao's sister Employee at Zhao Ming; Shuman and Yutian's best friend
Wang Jun	Lin Jinshui 林金水	Shunyuan's widowed father Butcher
Chen Puie Heng	Jian Wanshan 简万山	Shuman's father
Lin Yiting	Lü Miaoxiu 吕妙秀	Shuman's mother
Kenji	He Nianfeng 贺年丰	Zhenghao and Jingchun's father
