= Ong Ai Leng =

Malaysian actress based in Singapore (born 1978)

- Born: 2 November 1978 (age 48); Johor Bahru, Malaysia
- Occupation: Actress
- Years active: 2002–present
- Spouse: Kenne Yam (m. 2013)

Chinese name
- Simplified Chinese: 王爱玲
- Traditional Chinese: 王愛玲
Transcriptions
Standard Mandarin
- Hanyu Pinyin: Wáng Àilíng
Yue: Cantonese
- Jyutping: Wong4 Oi3 Ling4
Southern Min
- Hokkien POJ: Ông Ài-lêng

Ong Ai Leng (simplified Chinese: 王爱玲; traditional Chinese: 王愛玲; pinyin: Wáng Àilíng; Jyutping: Wong4 Oi3 Ling4; Pe̍h-ōe-jī: Ông Ài-lêng; born 2 November 1978) is a Malaysian actress based in Singapore.

== Career ==
Ong made her acting debut in Malaysia in 2002 before moving to Singapore. She has acted in both English and Chinese language dramas and in Singapore-Malaysia co-productions.

Ong collaborated with fellow Mediacorp artistes Jeff Wang and Apple Hong in opening a chain of Taiwanese street snack shops across Singapore called "Xiao Bar Wang" 小霸王 owned by Wang. She also owns several freelance businesses in Malaysia.

Ong left the entertainment industry after opted not to renew her contract with Mediacorp in 2010.

== Personal life ==
Ong was high school classmates with Zen Chong.

Ong married Hongkong director Kenne Yam in 2013.

== Filmography ==
Films
Year	Films	Role
2022	Kongsi Raya	Zhen Jie
2023	Ma, I Love You 真爱好妈	吴美玲

Television Dramas
Year	Drama	Role	Notes	Ref
2006	C.I.D.	Lin Yaoshan 林耀珊		
2006	Rhapsody in Blue	Ya Er		
2006	The Undisclosed	Carol		
2006	An Enchanted Life	Ai Xi		
2007	The Homecoming	Su Peishan (Sandy)		
2007	Honour and Passion	Miss Lau		
2007	Metamorphosis	Blood Rose	Cameo	
2007	The Golden Path		Cameo	
2008	Addicted To Love	Leila Song Lina		
2008	Just in Singapore	Shu Min		
2008	By My Side	Cecelia		
2009	Romantic Delicacies	Mu Qian		
2009	My Kampong Days	Cai Shu Lian		
2010	Happy Family	Mary		
2010	Unriddle	Li Shan		
