= Wee Kheng Ming =

- Born: Wee Kheng Ming; 20 November 1974 (age 50); Malaysia
- Occupation(s): Actor, host, singer

Chinese name
- Traditional Chinese: 黃啟銘
- Simplified Chinese: 黄启铭
Transcriptions
Standard Mandarin
- Hanyu Pinyin: Huáng Qǐmíng
Yue: Cantonese
- Jyutping: Wong4 Kai2 Ming4
Southern Min
- Hokkien POJ: Ûiⁿ Khé-bêng
- Tâi-lô: Uînn Khé-bîng

Wee Kheng Ming (simplified Chinese: 黄启铭; traditional Chinese: 黃啟銘; pinyin: Huáng Qǐmíng; Jyutping: Wong4 Kai2 Ming4; Pe̍h-ōe-jī: Ûiⁿ Khé-bêng), also known as Huang Qi Ming, is a Malaysian actor and singer. Wee used to work in the tourism industry before going into showbiz. He started out in showbiz as a singer and TV host. Although fairly new to acting at that time, Wee was given his first lead role in The Thin Line in which he played one of the three main characters. He was nominated for the Best Actor Award at the 2010 Golden Awards.

== Filmography ==
Year	Work	Role	Notes
2017	Legal Eagles 法网天后	Wu Jia Ming	Supporting Role 男配角; Malaysian Production
2014	Entangled 日落洞		Supporting Role 男配角; Singapore Co-production
2014	Spice Up 幸福料理	Mike Cai Min Jie	Supporting Role 男配角; Malaysian Production
2013	Love At Risk 爱情风险	Hao Jiyi	Supporting Role 男配角; Singapore Co-production
2012	Unriddle 2 最火搭档2	Dylan Cai Zhiming	Supporting Role 男配角; Singapore Co-production
2011	Kampong Ties 甘榜情		Supporting Role 男配角; Singapore Co-production
2011	Destiny in Her Hands 断掌的女人	Wen Qibing	Supporting Role 男配角; Malaysian Production
2010	Unriddle 最火搭档	Dylan Cai Zhiming	Supporting Role 男配角; Singapore Co-production
2010	Injustice 血蝴蝶	He Zhenghao	Siblings with Emily Lim; Supporting Role 男配角; Malaysian Production
2009	My Kampong Days 家在半山芭		Singapore Co-production
2008	The Thin Line 还我情真	Liang Yaoguo	Pairs up with Tracy Lee; 1/3 of the Male Lead 三大男主角之一; Malaysian Production
2008	The Beautiful Scent 美丽的气味	Isaac	Supporting Role 男配角; Singapore Co-production
2007	Love is All Around 爱在你左右	Zhuang Jiawei	Pairs up with Apple Hong; 1/2 of the Male Lead 两大男主角之一; Singapore Co-production
2007	Falling in Love 情有可缘		Singapore Co-production
