= Deal or No Deal Malaysia =

Deal or No Deal Malaysia may refer to:

- Deal or No Deal Malaysia (English-language game show)
- Deal or No Deal Malaysia (Mandarin-language game show)
