= Dark Sunset =

- From left to right: Goh Wee Ping, Aenie Wong, Lawrence Wong, Moo Yan Yee, Zen Chong, Tracy Lee
- 黑色夕阳
- Genre: Mystery; Thriller
- Starring: Moo Yan Yee; Lawrence Wong; Zen Chong; Aenie Wong; Tracy Lee; Goh Wee Ping
- Opening theme: 《黑色疑感》 by Wei En
- Ending theme: 《说爱》
- Countries of origin: Malaysia; Singapore
- Original language: Mandarin
- No. of episodes: 30

Production
- Running time: 45 minutes (approx.)

Original release
- Network: ntv7 (Malaysia); Mediacorp Channel 8 (Singapore)
- Release: 17 November 2011 – 9 January 2012

Related
- Kampong Ties; Secrets For Sale; Injustice The Score

Dark Sunset is a Malaysian-Singaporean television drama series and the 24th co-production of MediaCorp TV and ntv7. It is also the fourth production by MediaCorp Studios Malaysia Sdn Bhd. It was aired on ntv7 from 17 November 2011 to 9 January 2012. In Singapore, it is expected to be broadcast in 2013.

== Synopsis ==
This drama is based on real police cases. A mysterious death has taken place in a wealthy family. Ye Tingting is sent by the CID to investigate the cause of Lin Zhicai's death besides gathering evidence to charge Lin Wenfu for his illegal activities. While the Lin family appear like the dream wealthy family, dark secrets lurk within the four walls of their mansion, many dating back some thirty years.

When Lin Wenfu was a child, his father Lin Maogen was suspected of killing his four friends and business partners to pocket their profits. No bodies or evidence was found indicating that Lin Maogen was the killer and he vehemently denied any part in it. One of the men Ou Laifu's wife cursed him, saying that the Lin family line will end at Wenfu's son. The pregnant Mrs Ou hung herself at the gate of the Lins' house and Lin Maogen later died of a terrible mysterious illness.

At present, the Lin family has been receiving death threats after Zhicai's death was reported in the news. Kexin's dog is killed and its corpse sent to their house. Some "supernatural" incidents take place in the house. Then, tragedy befalls Lin Wenfu's own men one by one. Rumours indicate that perhaps "the curse" is at work again. A mysterious woman keeps turning up at the Lins' house to curse them and tell Wenfu's assistant Qiu Jiawei that "he has forgotten his roots". As time passes, Tingting realises that there is more to this "curse" than meets the eye and is determined to find the truth before someone else gets to it first.

== Cast and characters ==
Cast	Role	Description
Moo Yan Yee	Ye Tingting	Sent by the CID on a convert operation to investigate the Lin family Posed as Lin Zhicai's girlfriend in order to gather evidence about Zhicai's death and Wenfu's illegal dealings Later falls for Qiu Jiawei.
Goh Wee Ping	Shi Qiang	The Lin family's gardener Later married Kexin.
Zen Chong	Qiu Jiawei	Lin Wenfu's right-hand man Orphaned as a child and taken in by Lin Wenfu; Falls for Ye Tingting
Lawrence Wong	Chen Jianbang	The Lin family's lawyer His grandmother was Lin Maogen's ex-second wife.
Katie Lau	Du Xiaoli	Sent by C.I.D to aid Ting-Ting in her investigation.
Feon Lai	Hong Yu	Relative of Ou Laifu; Raised Jiawei as her own

=== Lin family ===
Cast	Role	Description
Johnny Ng	Lin Wenfu	The head of the Lin Family and son of Lin Maogen; Businessman by day, underworld boss by night
Aenie Wong	Lin Kexin	Lin Wenfu's eldest daughter, child of his first wife Intensely dislikes Yueqin and her children
Maggie Theng	Du Yueqin	Lin Wenfu's second wife Zhicai and Peixin's mother
Hero Tai	Lin Zhicai	Lin Wenfu's only son Committed suicide (later suspected to be murder); Had a special friendship with Shi Qiang, the gardener
Tracy Lee	Lin Peixin	Zhicai's younger sister Had a crush on Jiawei
Ivonne Saw	Zhao Siqi	Lin Wenfu's third wife Mentally fragile and disliked by most of the family
	Lin Xiaoxin	Siqi's autistic daughter
Candy Lim	Luo Xiaoling	Lin Wenfu's fourth wife She was 'brought' in to the Lin Family by Siqi but later turned her back on Siqi.
