= List of The Queen episodes =

The Queen (Chinese: 复仇女王) is a Singaporean television thriller action crime fatal produced by Wawa Pictures in 2016, starring Jesseca Liu, Priscelia Chan, Vivian Lai, Apple Hong and Jayley Woo as the main characters of the series. Members from an exclusive invite-only ‘Revenge Queen’ club are regular white and blue collar workers by day, but by night, they put on black masquerade masks, avenge fellow womenfolk in trouble and help them stand up on their feet again. The series began airing on Channel 8 HD on Thursday, 18 February 2016 with 20 episodes.

== Episodes ==
No.	Title	Original release date
1	"Episode 1"	18 February 2016
2	"Episode 2"	19 February 2016
3	"Episode 3"	22 February 2016
4	"Episode 4"	23 February 2016
5	"Episode 5"	24 February 2016
6	"Episode 6"	25 February 2016
7	"Episode 7"	26 February 2016
8	"Episode 8"	29 February 2016
9	"Episode 9"	1 March 2016
10	"Episode 10"	2 March 2016
11	"Episode 11"	3 March 2016
12	"Episode 12"	4 March 2016
13	"Episode 13"	7 March 2016
14	"Episode 14"	8 March 2016
15	"Episode 15"	9 March 2016
16	"Episode 16"	10 March 2016
17	"Episode 17"	11 March 2016
18	"Episode 18"	14 March 2016
19	"Episode 19"	15 March 2016
Final	"Last Episode (Finale)"	16 March 2016

== See also ==
- The Queen
- List of MediaCorp Channel 8 Chinese Drama Series (2010s)
