= Small Town Heroes (film) =

2022 Malaysian comedy-drama film

- Chinese: 英雄假期
- Directed by: Ryon Lee
- Starring: Jack Lim; Layla Sania; Phua Chandler; Roger Shak; Yuan Teng
- Edited by: hamster low, kenzir leow
- Distributed by: GSC Movies
- Release date: 3 February 2022
- Running time: 113 minutes
- Country: Malaysia
- Languages: Mandarin; Cantonese; Malay

Small Town Heroes (Chinese: 英雄假期) is a 2022 Malaysian comedy drama film by Ryon Lee. It tells the story of two children at orphanage, Hero and Ah Feng who embark on a journey along with three adults to find for Hero's mother when she did not come pick him up as promised.

The film receives positive reviews. It is released on 3 February 2022 in Malaysia. The film cast includes Jack Lim, Layla Sania, Phua Chandler, Roger Shak and Yuan Teng.

It is one of the five 2022 Malaysian and Singaporean Chinese New Year films, including Nasi Lemak 1.0 and Kongsi Raya (Malaysia), Ah Girls Go Army and Reunion Dinner (Singapore).

== Synopsis ==
During the pandemic, a young man returns to his hometown after the lockdown, recalling his childhood memories from 10 years ago......

The story begins as the quiet Hero, who is from the city, is arranged by his mother and temporarily moves into the House of Happiness orphanage at kampung. At there, he met another kid, the energetic Ah Feng. The two became close friends, and go on all sorts of adventures and misadventures. When Hero's mother did not pick him up as she had promised, Ah Feng suggest Hero to run away to Penang to find his mother. So, the two boys, along with three adults, the caring orphanage teacher Cikgu Aishah, delivery driver and Ah Feng's dad Zhong Wu, kampung durian seller Gua Qing, embark on a journey to search for Hero's mother in Penang. Can Hero find his mother?

== Cast ==
- Jack Lim as Zhong Wu
- Layla Sania as Cikgu Aishah
- Phua Chandler as Ah Feng
- Roger Shak as Hero
- Yuan Teng as Gua Ting
- Eric Lim
- MayJune
- Fauziah Nawi
- Lim Ching Miau
- Ayez Shaukat

== Release ==
The film is directed by Ryon Lee, whose works include writing the 2014 Malaysian film The Journey. The film is set in Penang, including Penang Island and Seberang Perai. Filming took place at the end of 2020 at various location such as George Town and Frog Hill, Tasek Gelugor. It also features some of the final moments of the famous Penang Ferry, which has since ceased operations in December 2020.
