= Project Superstar Malaysia season 3 =

Project Superstar Malaysia
- Season 3
- Hosted by: Gary Yap; Cheryl Lee
- Judges: Michelle Hsieh; Lee Sheng Ming; Jovi Theng; Al Guan; Ng Guo Liang
- Winner: Kay Guo
- Runner-up: Chee Shi Hau
- Finals venue: Malawati Stadium

Release
- Original network: 8TV
- Original release: 9 February – 3 May 2008

The third season of the Malaysian reality talent show Project SuperStar Malaysia, based on the Singaporean reality show of the same name began on 2 February 2008 on 8TV. For the third consecutive season, Gary Yap and Cheryl Lee returned as hosts.

The show premiered on 9 February 2008, with the live finals aired on 3 May 2008 at Malawati Stadium. Kay Guo, the winner of the female category, was announced as the overall winner of the season, with male category winner Chee Shi Hau as the overall runner-up. Guo was also the first female winner of Project Superstar Malaysia, as well as the first female winner in the entire Project Superstar franchise; she received a cash prize of RM$10,000 and a Recording Contract from EMI, while Chee was awarded a cash prize of RM$2,000.

== Development ==
Over 4,000 aspirants auditioned for the competition when it was announced. Auditions took place in late 2007 and the final selection of the top 24 were revealed to the public for the first time on 16 February 2008. Their finalists were showcased in one episode on 17 February 2008.

On the live shows up until the grand finals, the voting percentages were modified, with both the judges' scores and public votes take up 50% of the scores each, instead of 70%-30% as opposed to the previous seasons.

== Finalists ==
Key: Key:

– Winner
– Runner-up
– Gender/Category runner-up
– Semi-finalist
– Category 6th-8th place (lost revival)
– Advanced via Revival

Act	Age(s)	Occupation	Gender/Category	Result
Kay Guo 郭晓薇	22	Student	Female	Winner
Chee Shi Hau 徐仕豪	22	Student	Male	Runner-up
Eddie Lai 赖勇霖	19	Student	Male	Category Runner-up
Nicole Lai 赖淞凤	19	Student	Female	Category Runner-up
Ellen Chee 徐佩霞	20	Clerk	Female	Category 3rd place
Adrian Tan 陈凯旋	20	Student	Male	Category 3rd place
Elizabeth "Liz" Ee 伊利莎	22	Student	Female	Category 4th place
Will Zheng 郑幸安	20	Student	Male	Category 4th place
Chiam May May 詹依美	25	Student	Female	Category 5th place
Cliff Teh 郑至围	27	Salesperson	Male	Category 5th place
Elson Dai 戴祺锡	25	Health Consultant	Male	Category 6th-8th place
Kevin Deng 邓凯文	19	Student	Male	Category 6th-8th place
Alice Lim 林芯糸	22	Student	Female	Category 6th-8th place
Jac Lim 林伟明	22	Student	Male	Category 6th-8th place
Ng Hwee San 黄惠珊	23	Student	Female	Category 6th-8th place
Pink Png 方玲妮	23	Unemployed	Female	Category 6th-8th place
Alvin Bay 马铭泉	20	Student	Male	Category 9th-12th place
Apple Chew 邱淑菱	21	Student	Female	Category 9th-12th place
Genie Ng 黄净莹	22	Secretary	Female	Category 9th-12th place
Issac Teo 张富泷	20	Student	Male	Category 9th-12th place
Travis Teo 张福峰	23	Chef	Male	Category 9th-12th place
Shine Wong 王幸儿	20	Student	Female	Category 9th-12th place
Fiona Woo 邬汶凌	19	Salesperson	Female	Category 9th-12th place
Ken Wan 万子健	25	Hairstylist	Male	Category 9th-12th place

== Live show details ==
=== Week 1: Quarter Finals 1 (23/24 February) ===
- Theme: Personal Song (no theme), Contestant's duet

Contestants' performances on the first live show
Contestant	Order	First song	Order	Second song (duet)	Judges' score					Result
Contestant	Order	First song	Order	Second song (duet)	MH	SM	JT	AG	Total	Result
Female category (23 February)
Liz Ee	1	"离不开他"	7	"马德里不思议" (With Ng Hwee San)	5.5	5.5	6.0	6.0	23.0	Safe
Ng Hwee San	2	"我等的人会是谁"	8	"马德里不思议" (With Liz Ee)	6.5	6.5	6.5	6.0	25.5	Safe
Apple Chew	3	"会呼吸的痛"	9	"Ring Ring Ring" (With Shine Wong)	6.0	6.5	5.0	6.5	24.0	Eliminated
Shine Wong	4	"飘着"	10	"Ring Ring Ring" (With Apple Chew)	5.0	5.0	5.5	5.5	21.0	Eliminated
Pink Png	5	"一个人"	11	"维多利亚的秘密" (With Chiam May May)	5.5	5.0	5.0	6.5	22.0	Safe
Chiam May May	6	"热浪"	12	"维多利亚的秘密" (With Pink Png)	6.5	6.5	5.5	6.6	25.0	Safe
Male category (24 February)
Elson Dai	1	"只要你还在"	7	"记得爱" (With Travis Teo)	6.5	7.0	7.0	7.0	27.5	Safe
Travis Teo	2	"残废"	8	"记得爱" (With Elson Dai)	5.5	5.5	6.5	6.0	23.5	Eliminated
Ken Wan	3	"我不会唱歌"	9	"Baby Baby" (With Adrian Tan)	6.0	6.0	5.0	5.0	22.0	Eliminated
Adrian Tan	4	"Kiss Me 1 2 3"	10	"Baby Baby" (With Ken Wan)	7.0	6.0	6.0	5.0	24.0	Safe
Will Zheng	5	"最长的电影"	11	"3-7-20-1" (With Chee Shi Hau)	7.5	6.5	7.5	7.0	28.5	Safe
Chee Shi Hau	6	"原来我最爱的人是你不是他"	12	"3-7-20-1" (With Will Zheng)	8.0	7.5	8.5	7.0	31.0	Safe

=== Week 2: Quarter Finals 2 (1/2 March) ===
- Theme: Personal Song (no theme), Contestant's duet

Contestants' performances on the second live show
Contestant	Order	First song	Order	Second song (duet)	Judges' score					Result
Contestant	Order	First song	Order	Second song (duet)	MH	SM	JT	AG	Total	Result
Female category (1 March)
Ellen Chee	1	"深信不疑"	7	"就是你" (With Nicole Lai)	5.5	5.5	5.0	6.0	22.0	Safe
Nicole Lai	2	"你给的"	8	"就是你" (With Ellen Lee)	7.0	7.0	6.5	7.0	27.5	Safe
Fiona Woo	3	"第九夜"	9	"日不落" (With Genie Ng)	6.5	5.5	5.5	6.5	24.0	Eliminated
Genie Ng	4	"当你离开的时候"	10	"日不落" (With Fiona Woo)	5.5	6.0	6.0	5.5	22.5	Eliminated
Alice Lim	5	"换季"	11	"Supermodel" (With Kay Guo)	5.5	5.0	5.0	5.0	20.5	Safe
Kay Guo	6	"不想懂得"	12	"Supermodel" (With Alice Lim)	6.5	6.0	6.0	6.5	25.0	Safe
Male category (2 March)
Issac Teo	1	"爱爱爱"	7	"杀手" (With Eddie Lai)	6.0	6.0	6.0	6.5	24.5	Eliminated
Eddie Lai	2	"不屑纪念"	8	"杀手" (With Issac Teo)	7.0	7.0	7.5	6.5	28.0	Safe
Jac Lim	3	"想太多"	9	"对手" (With Cliff Teh)	6.5	6.5	7.0	5.5	25.5	Safe
Cliff Teh	4	"眼底星空"	10	"对手" (With Jac Lim)	7.5	6.5	7.5	6.5	28.0	Safe
Alvin Bay	5	"两败俱伤"	11	"对手" (With Kevin Deng)	6.0	5.5	6.5	5.5	23.5	Eliminated
Kevin Deng	6	"懂了"	12	"对手" (With Alvin Bay)	6.5	6.0	6.0	5.5	24.0	Safe

=== Week 3: Quarter Finals 3 (8/9 March) ===
- Theme: Personal Song (no theme), Contestant's duet

Contestants' performances on the third live show
Contestant	Order	First song	Order	Second song (duet)	Judges' score					Result
Contestant	Order	First song	Order	Second song (duet)	MH	SM	JT	AG	Total	Result
Female category (8 March)
Kay Guo	1	"手心"	5	"咕叽咕叽" (With Chiam Mei Mei)	6.0	6.0	6.5	6.0	24.5	Safe
Chiam Mei Mei	2	"后来的我们"	6	"咕叽咕叽" (With Kay Guo)	7.0	7.0	7.5	7.5	29.0	Safe
Alice Lim	3	"猜不透"	7	"五月天" (With Pink Png)	6.0	5.0	5.0	5.5	21.5	Eliminated
Pink Png	4	"失恋无罪"	8	"五月天" (With Alice Lim)	6.5	5.5	7.0	6.5	25.5	Eliminated
Male category (9 March)
Jac Lim	1	"造飞机"	5	"Believe in Love" (With Will Zheng)	5.5	6.0	5.0	5.5	22.0	Eliminated
Will Zheng	2	"起床歌	6	"Believe in Love" (With Jac Lim)	8.0	8.0	8.0	8.0	32.0	Safe
Cliff Teh	3	"男人KTV"	7	"今天没回家" (With Elson Dai)	7.5	6.5	7.0	7.0	28.0	Safe
Elson Dai	4	"花田错"	8	"今天没回家" (With Cliff Teh)	7.0	6.0	6.5	6.0	25.5	Eliminated

=== Week 4: Quarter Finals 4 (15/16 March) ===
- Theme: Personal Song (no theme), Contestant's duet

Contestants' performances on the fourth live show
Contestant	Order	First song	Order	Second song (duet)	Judges' score					Result
Contestant	Order	First song	Order	Second song (duet)	MH	SM	JT	AG	Total	Result
Female category (15 March)
Nicole Lai	1	"Chinese Girl"	5	"Honey Honey Honey" (With Liz Ee)	6.5	6.5	6.0	6.0	25.0	Eliminated
Liz Ee	2	"双栖动物"	6	"Honey Honey Honey" (With Nicole Lai)	6.0	6.0	6.0	6.0	24.0	Safe
Ellen Chee	3	"雨天"	7	"失忆" (With Ng Hwee San)	7.0	7.5	6.5	6.5	27.5	Safe
Ng Hwee San	4	"非卖品"	8	"失忆" (With Ellen Chee)	6.5	6.5	6.0	6.0	25.0	Eliminated
Male category (16 March)
Chee Shi Hau	1	"做得到"	5	"美人鱼" (With Kevin Deng)	8.0	8.5	8.0	8.0	32.5	Safe
Kevin Deng	2	"倔强爱着你"	6	"美人鱼" (With Chee Shi Hau)	6.5	7.0	6.5	6.5	26.5	Eliminated
Adrian Tan	3	"一枝独秀"	7	"我们的歌" (With Eddie Lai)	7.0	7.5	6.5	6.5	27.5	Safe
Eddie Lai	4	"黑色翅膀"	8	"我们的歌" (With Adrian Tan)	7.5	6.5	6.5	6.5	27.0	Eliminated

=== Week 5: Revival Round (22/23 March) ===
- Theme: No theme, Contestant's Duet

The eight contestants who were eliminated from the third and fourth quarter-finals returned to the stage to perform for the revival round. The contestant who received the highest combined score from either the male and female categories would be reinstated from the competition.

Contestants' performances on the fifth live show
Contestant	Order	First song	Order	Second song (duet)	Judges' score					Result
Contestant	Order	First song	Order	Second song (duet)	MH	SM	JT	AG	Total	Result
Female category (22 March)
Alice Lim	1	"想个不停"	5	"阵阵跳" (With Nicole Lai)	5.5	6.0	6.0	5.5	23.0	Not revived
Nicole Lai	2	"爱请问怎么走"	6	"阵阵跳" (With Alice Lim)	7.5	7.5	8.0	7.5	30.5	Revived
Ng Hwee San	3	"对不起我爱你"	7	"月牙湾" (With Pink Png)	6.5	6.5	7.0	6.0	26.0	Not revived
Pink Png	4	"爱你的两个我"	8	"月牙湾" (With Ng Hwee San)	7.5	7.5	8.0	7.0	30.0	Not revived
Male category (23 March)
Eddie Lai	1	"那首歌"	5	"西界" (With Jac Lim)	7.5	7.5	7.0	7.0	29.0	Revived
Jac Lim	2	"其实还爱你"	6	"西界" (With Eddie Lai)	6.5	6.5	7.5	6.0	26.5	Not revived
Elson Dai	3	"彩虹"	7	"改变自己" (With Kevin Deng)	7.0	6.5	7.0	6.5	27.0	Not revived
Kevin Deng	4	"灰色空间"	8	"改变自己" (With Elson Dai)	6.5	6.5	6.5	6.0	25.5	Not revived

=== Week 6: Semi Finals 1 (29/30 March) ===
- Theme: Dance songs
- Group Performance: "当我们宅一块"

Contestants' performances on the sixth live show
Contestant	Order	Song	Judges' score					Result
Contestant	Order	Song	AG	LG	JT	SM	Total	Result
Female category (29 March)
Chiam May May	1	"隐隐"	6.5	6.5	6.5	6.5	26.0	Eliminated
Ellen Chee	2	"从台北到北京"	7.0	7.5	7.5	7.0	29.0	Safe
Liz Ee	3	"特务J"	7.5	6.5	6.5	6.5	27.0	Safe
Kay Guo	4	"Shakalaka Baby"	6.5	7.0	7.0	7.0	27.5	Safe
Nicole Lai	5	"代言人"	8.0	7.5	8.0	7.0	30.5	Safe
Male category (30 March)
Cliff Teh	1	"牛仔很忙"	6.5	7.0	6.5	6.5	26.5	Eliminated
Adrian Tan	2	"玩酷"	6.0	6.0	7.0	7.5	26.5	Safe
Will Zheng	3	"KO"	7.5	6.5	6.5	6.5	27.0	Safe
Chee Shi Hau	4	"零时差"	7.0	7.0	7.0	7.0	28.0	Safe
Eddie Lai	5	"呛司呛司"	6.5	6.5	6.0	6.0	25.0	Safe

=== Week 7: Semi Finals 2 (5/6 April) ===
- Theme: Best techniques
- Group Performance: "离开地球表面"

Contestants' performances on the seventh live show
Contestant	Order	Song	Judges' score					Result
Contestant	Order	Song	AG	MH	JT	SM	Total	Result
Female category (5 April)
Kay Guo	1	"管不着"	6.5	7.0	6.5	7.0	27.0	Safe
Nicole Lai	2	"傻瓜"	7.0	7.0	7.0	7.5	28.5	Safe
Ellen Chee	3	"不要说抱歉"	7.5	7.5	6.5	6.5	28.0	Safe
Liz Ee	4	"我爱你"	6.5	6.5	6.5	6.5	26.0	Eliminated
Male category (6 April)
Will Zheng	1	"Alright"	7.5	8.0	8.0	8.0	31.5	Eliminated
Eddie Lai	2	"如果"	6.5	7.0	7.0	7.0	27.5	Safe
Chee Shi Hau	3	"岚"	8.0	8.5	8.0	8.0	32.5	Safe
Adrian Tan	4	"爱情树"	6.5	8.0	7.0	7.0	28.5	Safe

=== Week 8: Semi Finals 3 (12/13 April) ===
- Theme: Guandong Translated Songs, Japanese/Korean Translated Songs
- Group Performance: "苦茶"

Contestants' performances on the eighth live show
Contestant	Order	First song	Order	Second song	Judges' score					Result
Contestant	Order	First song	Order	Second song	AG	MH	JT	SM	Total	Result
Female category (12 April)
Ellen Chee	1	"愿我可以学会放低你"	4	"受了点伤"	7.5	7.0	7.0	7.5	29.0	Eliminated
Kay Guo	2	"深爱"	5	"情不自禁"	6.5	7.0	7.0	7.0	27.5	Safe
Nicole Lai	3	"爱一个上一课"	6	"I Believe"	8.0	7.5	7.5	7.5	30.5	Safe
Male category (13 April)
Adrian Tan	1	"决战二世祖"	4	"May I Love You"	6.5	7.0	7.0	7.5	28.0	Eliminated
Eddie Lai	2	"爱回家"	5	"Only One"	6.5	7.0	7.0	7.0	27.5	Safe
Chee Shi Hau	3	"爱在记忆中找你"	6	"某年某月某一天"	8.0	7.5	7.5	7.5	30.5	Safe

=== Week 9: Category final (19/20 April) ===
- Theme: Judges' Choice, Malaysian Song, Winner's Single
- Group Performance: "我就是喜欢你"

Contestants' performances on the ninth live show
Contestant	Order	First song	Order	Second song	Order	Third song	Judges' score						Result
Contestant	Order	First song	Order	Second song	Order	Third song	AG	MH	JT	SM	Total	Average	Result
Female category (19 April)
Nicole Lai	1	"累格"	3	"Cepat Cepat"	5	"后备"	8.5	7.0	7.0	7.5	30.0	29.75	Runner-up
Nicole Lai	1	"累格"	3	"Cepat Cepat"	5	"后备"	7.5	7.5	7.0	7.5	29.5	29.75	Runner-up
Kay Guo	2	"爱我的资格"	4	"Mila Bila Cinta"	6	"后备"	7.5	7.5	7.5	8.0	30.5	29.75	Winner
Kay Guo	2	"爱我的资格"	4	"Mila Bila Cinta"	6	"后备"	7.5	7.0	7.0	7.5	29.0	29.75	Winner
Male category (20 April)
Chee Shi Hau	1	"让"	3	"Itu Kamu"	5	"Love"	7.0	7.5	7.0	7.5	29.0	29.75	Winner
Chee Shi Hau	1	"让"	3	"Itu Kamu"	5	"Love"	7.5	7.5	8.0	7.5	30.5	29.75	Winner
Eddie Lai	2	"爱我的两个人"	4	"Khayal"	6	"Love"	6.5	6.5	6.5	6.5	26.0	29.0	Runner-up
Eddie Lai	2	"爱我的两个人"	4	"Khayal"	6	"Love"	7.5	8.0	8.5	8.0	32.0	29.0	Runner-up

=== Week 10: Finals Prelude (26/27 April) ===
All top 24 finalists returned to the stage in this pre-recorded non-elimination performance show. It featured group performances from the finalists as well as a look-back on their journey in the competition.

Contestants' performances on the tenth live show
Contestant	Order	Song
Female category (26 April)
Ellen Chee / Apple Chew	1	"维多利亚的秘密"
Genie Ng / Alice Lim	2	"Honey Honey Honey"
Fiona Wo /Liz Ee	3	"就是你"
Pink Png / Chiam May May	4	"月牙湾"
Ng Hwee San / Shine Wong	5	"日不落"
Nicole Lai	6	"咕叽咕叽"
Male category (27 April)
Cliff Teh / Travis Teo	1	"记得爱"
Elson Dai / Alvin Bay	2	"3-7-20-1"
Ken Wan / Adrian Tan	3	"对手"
Kevin Deng / Jac Lim	4	"Baby Baby"
Will Zheng / Issac Teo	5	"美人鱼"
Eddie Lai	6	"爱我的两个人"

=== Week 11: Final (3 May) ===
- Theme: Fast-paced Songs, Charming Songs, Michael Wong's duet, Contestants' duet, Judges' choice, Winner's song
- Group performances: "梦不落" (all finalists), "Will Be Superstar" (Chee Shi Hau & Kay Guo), "Super Star" (Female finalists eliminated in the first quarter-finals), "超喜欢你" (Male finalists eliminated in the first quarter-finals), "我恋爱了" (Female finalists eliminated in the second quarter-finals), "阳光宅男" (Male finalists eliminated in the second quarter-finals), "桃花源" (Female finalists eliminated in the semi-finals), "在这里等你" (Male finalists eliminated in the semi-finals), "我的天空我的梦" (all finalists)
- Musical guests: Desiree Tan & Orange Tan ("特务J"/"Way Back into Love"), Johnson Wee & Henley Hii ("傀儡"/"一眼瞬间"), Michael Wong ("烟火")

Contestants' performances on the eleventh live show
Contestant	Order	Songs	Judges' votes						Score			Result
Contestant	Order	Songs	JT	GL	MH	SM	AG	Result	Single	Public	Total	Result
Kay Guo	1	"永远的快乐"	✔	✔	✔	✔	✔	5/5 (Won)	18%	36%	54%	Winner
Kay Guo	3	"失忆"	—	—	—	—	—	0/5 (Lost)	18%	36%	54%	Winner
Kay Guo	5	"对你有感觉" (with Michael Wong)	✔	✔	✔	✔	✔	5/5 (Won)	18%	36%	54%	Winner
Kay Guo	7	"你是我心内的一首歌" (with Chee Shi Hau)	✔	✔	✔	✔	✔	5/5 (Won)	18%	36%	54%	Winner
Kay Guo	9	"太想快乐"	—	—	—	✔	—	1/5 (Lost)	18%	36%	54%	Winner
Kay Guo	11	"缺氧"	✔	✔	✔	—	—	3/5 (Won)	18%	36%	54%	Winner
Chee Shi Hau	2	"新歌试唱"	—	—	—	—	—	0/5 (Lost)	12%	34%	46%	Runner-Up
Chee Shi Hau	4	"世界唯一的你"	✔	✔	✔	✔	✔	5/5 (Won)	12%	34%	46%	Runner-Up
Chee Shi Hau	6	"不会分离" (with Michael Wong)	—	—	—	—	—	0/5 (Lost)	12%	34%	46%	Runner-Up
Chee Shi Hau	8	"你是我心内的一首歌" (with Kay Guo)	—	—	—	—	—	0/5 (Lost)	12%	34%	46%	Runner-Up
Chee Shi Hau	10	"逃"	✔	✔	✔	—	✔	4/5 (Won)	12%	34%	46%	Runner-Up
Chee Shi Hau	12	"围墙"	—	—	—	✔	✔	2/5 (Lost)	12%	34%	46%	Runner-Up

== See also ==
- MediaCorp
- 8TV
- Project SuperStar
