= The Beautiful Scent =

2008 television series

- 美丽的气味
- Starring: Dawn Yeoh; Pan Lingling; Zheng Geping; Cai Peixuan; William San
- Countries of origin: Malaysia; Singapore
- Original language: Mandarin
- No. of episodes: 25

Production
- Producer: 袁树伟
- Running time: approx. 45 minutes

Original release
- Network: ntv7 (Malaysia); MediaCorp Channel 8 (Singapore)
- Release: 11 February 2008

The Beautiful Scent (Chinese: 美丽的气味) is a Singaporean and Malaysian co-production Chinese drama which was telecast on Singapore's free-to-air channel, MediaCorp TV Channel 8. It was first broadcast in Malaysia in 2007. The drama made its debut in Singapore on 11 February 2008. The drama consists of a total of 25 episodes. It screened on every weekday night, 7pm.

== Cast ==
=== Main cast ===
- Dawn Yeoh as Zeng Meili
- Pan Lingling as Winner
- Zheng Geping as Macho Tang Zhang Yao
- Cai Pei Xuan as Lin Xiao Tong
- William San as Dominic

=== Supporting cast ===
- Leslie Chai as Chen Yong
- Aenie Wong as Wang Li Qiao
- Chen Wen Bin as Xiao Ya
- Bernard Tan as Li Cheng
- Hang Yi Ting as Mona
- Lin Pei Qi as Shi Yun
- Xie Wen Hui as Judy
- Yue Huan as Lin Xiao Ping
- Yang Wei Wen as Wu Ying Jie
- Wee Kheng Ming as Isaac
