= List of Be Happy episodes =

Below is an episodic synopsis of Be Happy, which consists of 20 episodes and broadcast on MediaCorp Channel 8.

== Episodic Synopsis ==
No.	Title	Original release date	Encore Date
1	"Episode 1"	March 15, 2011	April 18, 2012
2	"Episode 2"	March 16, 2011	April 19, 2012
3	"Episode 3"	March 17, 2011	April 20, 2012
4	"Episode 4"	March 18, 2011	April 23, 2012
5	"Episode 5"	March 21, 2011	April 24, 2012
6	"Episode 6"	March 22, 2011	April 25, 2012
7	"Episode 7"	March 23, 2011	April 26, 2012
8	"Episode 8"	March 24, 2011	April 27, 2012
9	"Episode 9"	March 25, 2011	April 30, 2012
10	"Episode 10"	March 28, 2011	May 1, 2012
11	"Episode 11"	March 29, 2011	May 2, 2012
12	"Episode 12"	March 30, 2011	May 3, 2012
13	"Episode 13"	March 31, 2011	May 4, 2012 PG
14	"Episode 14"	April 1, 2011	May 7, 2012
15	"Episode 15"	April 4, 2011	May 8, 2012 PG
16	"Episode 16"	April 5, 2011	May 9, 2012
17	"Episode 17"	April 6, 2011	May 10, 2012 PG
18	"Episode 18"	April 7, 2011	May 11, 2012 PG
19	"Episode 19"	April 8, 2011	May 14, 2012
20	"Episode 20 (Finale)"	April 11, 2011	May 15, 2012 PG

== See also ==
- List of programmes broadcast by MediaCorp Channel 8
- Be Happy
