= All in 700 =

- Promotional poster
- Chinese: 700歲旅程
- Literal meaning: 700 Year-Old Journey
- Hanyu Pinyin: Qībǎi Suì Lǚchéng
- Hokkien POJ: Chhit-pah-sòe-lí-têng
- Genre: Family; Drama
- Created by: Taiwan Television
- Written by: Yang Yi Xun 楊意尋 (Screenwriter coordinator); Huang Yuan Bei 黃元蓓 (Screenwriter coordinator); Xie Meng Qian 謝夢遷; Li Wan Rong 李宛蓉; Lin Li Xin 林俐馨; Chen Jun Lin 陳俊霖; Chen Xue Lin 陳雪琳; Cai Yi Xuan 蔡逸璇; Shi Yi Ning 施怡寧; Jian Yu Ru 簡郁儒; Fan Yu Wei 范育維
- Directed by: Danny Dun
- Starring: Darren Chiu; Jessie Chang; Ikeya Chen; Lung Shao-hua; Jason King; Ting Chiang
- Opening theme: Love With No Regrets 愛無遺憾 by Ric Jan
- Ending theme: How Have You Been 別來無恙 by Christine Fan feat. William Wei
- Country of origin: Taiwan
- Original languages: Hokkien; Mandarin
- No. of episodes: 60

Production
- Producer: Chen Hui-ling
- Production location: Taiwan
- Running time: 60 minutes

Original release
- Network: TTV
- Release: 23 November 2016 – 15 February 2017

All in 700 (Chinese: 700歲旅程; pinyin: Qībǎi Suì Lǚchéng; lit. ''700 Year-Old Trip' or '700 Year-Old Journey'') is a 2016 Taiwanese television series starring Darren Chiu, Jessie Chang, Ikeya Chen, Lung Shao-hua, Jason King and Ting Chiang. Filming began on June 24, 2015 and wrapped up on June 8, 2016. First original broadcast began on November 23, 2016 on TTV airing every weekdays night at 8:00-9:00 pm.

== Synopsis ==
A group of elderly citizens has been nearly forgotten by the bustling modern Taiwanese society. But the baby boomer residents at the Yinhwa senior community know all about living through tough times to help usher in the Taiwanese economic boom. But when their own safe haven of Yinhwa comes under fiscal hardship, they need to act fast. With the help of young photographer Li Rong An (Darren Qiu) and Liu Yu Fan (Ikeya Chen), the senior citizens embark on a tour of Taiwan to draw attention to their cause through modern social media. Can 10 senior citizens, whose combined age is more than 700 years, prove that they are still relevant to modern society?

== Cast ==
=== Main cast ===
- Darren Chiu as Li Rong An 李榕桉
- Jessie Chang as Li Xin Yue 黎心悅
- Ikeya Chen as Liu Yu Fan (Fan Fan) 劉玉帆（帆帆）
- Andy Kung as Wang Shang Ji 王上吉（Jimmy）
- Ting Chiang as Zhang Hu Sheng (Uncle Lan Shan) 張滬生（藍山伯）
  - Action Tang as young Uncle Lan Shan
- Jason King as Li Tian Yong (Uncle Yong) 李天勇（勇伯）
- Wang Man-chiao as Liu Hao 劉好
  - Amanda Fan as young Liu Hao
- Ying Tsai-ling as Gu Mei Jun 顧梅君
- Mei Fang as Grandma Gu (Da Ah Ma) 顧奶奶（大阿嬤）
  - Sara Yu 琇琴 as young Grandma Gu
- Tang Chuan 唐川 as Xu Chao Huang 許朝晃
  - Tsao Ching-chun 曹景俊 as young Chao Huang
- Lin Nai-hua 林乃華 as Liao Shu Qin 廖淑卿
- Chu Lu-hao as Chen Bi Xian 陳必先
  - Stanly Chen as young Bi Xian
- Shangguan Min 上官鳴 as Wu Huo Wang 吳火旺
- Ma Hui-chen as Yang Qiao Fang 楊巧芳
- Chang Chin as Lao Xiao Shan 勞小珊（Laura）

=== Supporting cast ===
- Lung Shao-hua 龍劭華 as Li De Lang 黎德朗
  - Joe Shu-Wei Chang 張書偉 as young De Lang
- Wen Yi Ru 潘奕如 as Huang Kai Lin 黃愷琳
- Aron 龍三 as Zhu Yun Hao 朱允豪
- Ti Chih-Chieh 狄志杰 as Du Xue Ya 杜學亞

=== Special guest appearance ===
- Zheng Cheng Jun 程政鈞 as Shi Guang's father
- Wu Jun Yi 吳俊毅 as coast guard
- Fu Xian Hao 傅顯皓
- Zheng Yu Han 鄭羽涵
- Wu Ling Shan 吳鈴山 as Chen Zhen Xin 陳振欣
- Debbie Chou 周丹薇 as Zhuang Jin Hong 莊錦紅
- Wu Guo Zhou 吳國州 as Xiao Liu 小劉
- Huang Hao You 黃浩詠 as Scrievener Jian 簡代書
- Francesca Kao as Tan Li Zhen
- Angus Hsieh 謝承均 as Zhou Shi Guang 周世光
- Liu Xiang Jun 劉香君 as fortuneteller
- Ronan Lo 羅能華 as Xiao Tang 小唐
- Candy Yang 楊小黎 as Li Min 麗敏
- Annie Duan 段可風 as Ai Mei 艾眉
- Ting Chen 陳霆 as young Grandpa Gu 年輕顧爺爺
- Zhang Dong Qing 張東晴 as Sha Wei Ka 莎薇卡
- Da Pai 大牌 as mayor
- Hsu Nai-lin as visitor
- Lee Chih-Ching 李之勤 as Cheng Xi 程曦
- Jiang Qing Xia 江青霞 as Lai Shu Mei 賴淑美
- Ouyang Lun 歐陽倫 as Chen Jie Sheng 陳傑生
- Ruan Yu Tian 阮于恬 as author
- Lin Yi Xiong 林義雄 as Liu Zhong Qiang 劉忠強
- Ding Ning 丁寧 as Sha Man Sha 莎曼莎
- Huang Shu Wei 黃書維 as An Chen 安臣
- Emily Liang 梁佑南 as Chen Yue Xia 陳月霞
- Chung Hsin-Ling 鍾欣凌 as Wan Ping 婉萍
- Lan Ya Yun 藍雅芸 as designer
- Zheng Kai Yun 鄭凱云 as Gu Jin Cheng 顧晉承
- Fang Da Wei 方大韋 as Chen Wen Rui 陳文瑞
- Lu Biao 盧彪 as Zheng Kun Qiang 鄭坤強
- Zhang Ling Ling 張翎翎 as Jiang Xiao Hui 江曉慧
- Pai Ming-Hua 白明華 as Shu Qin's mother
- Wei-Hua Lan 藍葦華 as Zhu Zhi Ming 朱志銘
- Jimmy Tseng 曾子益 as Wang Da Wei 王大偉
- Chen Yu-Mei 陳玉玫 as Zhang Xiu Qin 張秀琴
- Cai Yi Jun 蔡宜君 as Guo Ming Mei 郭明美
- Jian Chang 檢場 as Chen Zheng Rong 陳正榮
- Yin Chao-te 尹昭德 as Chen Li Ye 陳立業
- Jane Hsu 許蓁蓁 as Ai Lin 艾琳
- Joseph Hsia 夏靖庭 as Gao Ming Cheng 高明誠

== Soundtrack ==
- Love With No Regrets 愛無遺憾 by Ric Jan 荒山亮
- How Have You Been 別來無恙 by Christine Fan 范瑋琪 feat. William Wei 韋禮安
- Some Time After 很久很久以後 by Christine Fan 范瑋琪
- Seesaw 翹翹板 by Fang Wu 吳汶芳
- 散落的星空 by Fang Wu 吳汶芳
- A Youth 一首青春 by Lin Zong Xing 林宗興
- 日頭的味 by Cai Jia Ying 蔡佳瑩
- That Person 彼個人 by Joey Chiang 江惠儀
- 無想欲離開 by Joey Chiang 江惠儀
- Slowly Love 緩緩愛 by Joey Chiang 江惠儀
- 思念來敲門 by Joey Chiang 江惠儀
- 幸福會慣習 by Joey Chiang 江惠儀
- 再會青春的夢 by Joey Chiang 江惠儀
- 藍色紀念日 by Queenie Fang 方宥心
- 我會乖乖 by Cai Cheng-Rong 蔡承融
- Ship of Happiness 幸福的船 by Jenny Huang 黃鳳儀
- 放輕鬆 by Jenny Huang 黃鳳儀
- Whisky Love Song Whisky情歌 by Jenny Huang 黃鳳儀
- Your Companion 你作伴 by Jenny Huang 黃鳳儀
- I'll Live For You 為你活下去 by Ric Jan 荒山亮
- Sound of A Broken Heart 心破碎的聲 by Ric Jan 荒山亮
- My Favorite Love Song 最愛的情歌 by Ric Jan 荒山亮

== Broadcast ==
Network	Country	Airing Date	Timeslot
TTV	Taiwan	November 23, 2016	Monday to Friday 8:00-9:00 pm

== Episode ratings ==
Competing dramas on rival channels airing at the same time slot were:

- SET Taiwan - Taste of Life
- SET Metro - V-Focus
- CTV - The Age of Innocence, Let It Fly
- FTV - Spring Flower
- CTS - W

Air Date	Episodes	Weekly Average Ratings	Rank
Nov 23–25, 2016	1-3	0.81	5
Nov 28-Dec 2, 2016	4-8	--	--
Dec 5–9, 2016	9-13	0.83	4
Dec 12–16, 2016	14-18	0.93	4
Dec 19–23, 2016	19-23	1.04	4
Dec 26–30, 2016	24-28	1.02	5
Jan 2–6, 2017	29-33	1.01	4
Jan 9-13, 2017	34-38	1.08	4
Jan 16–20, 2017	39-43	0.94	4
Jan 23–26, 2017^{1}	44-47	0.87	4
Jan 30-Feb 3, 2017	48-52	0.81	3
Feb 6-10, 2017	53-57	0.97	3
Feb 13–15, 2017	58-60	0.96	3
Average ratings		--	

^Note 1: No episode was aired on January 27, 2017 due to TTV airing of "2017 Super Star: A Red & White Lunar New Year Special"
