= Gary Yap =

Chinese actor (born 1977)

- Born: Gary Yap Choon Kean; 15 January 1977 (age 48); Kuala Lumpur, Malaysia
- Occupation(s): Host, Actor, Singer
- Years active: 2001–present
- Awards: Star Search 2001 : Malaysia Male Champion

Chinese name
- Traditional Chinese: 葉俊岑
- Simplified Chinese: 叶俊岑
Transcriptions
Standard Mandarin
- Hanyu Pinyin: Yè Jùncén
Hakka
- Pha̍k-fa-sṳ: Ya̍p Tsun-tshìm
Yue: Cantonese
- Jyutping: Jip6 Zeon3 Sam4
Southern Min
- Hokkien POJ: Ia̍p Chùn-gîm
- Tâi-lô: Ia̍p Tsùn-gîm
- Musical career
- Members: 10
- Past members: 5

Gary Yap (Chinese: 叶俊岑; pinyin: Yè Jùncén; Jyutping: Jip6 Zeon3 Sam4; Pe̍h-ōe-jī: Ia̍p Chùn-gîm; Pha̍k-fa-sṳ: Ya̍p Tsun-tshìm; born 15 January 1977) is a Malaysian television personality and a host on Star Search talent quest.

== Career ==
Gary Yap was schoolmates with fellow Star Search contestant and actor Zhang Yaodong.

Yap went to Singapore in 2001 to pioneer his career as an interpreter.

He represented Malaysia while participating in the finals of "Star Search", a television program hosted by the New Media Results Malaysia Male Champions' Trophy. Afterward, he stayed on board with new media as a drama series actor and presenter and is now host of 8TV's entertainment program 8 E-News.

Yap is usually working as a host in Malaysia's Television broadcast studio. This entertainment information show is broadcast live every Monday through Friday afternoon, reporting and sharing information about Chinese artists and entertainment news. While Yap hosts the program two or three days a week, the other four presenters take turns presiding on the remaining days.

Yap has also been requested to host a new program, Hot Chef, and the second season of the singing talent contest 'Ultimate Power Group'.

=== 2004–2006 ===
Yap joined 8 TV. Afterwards, he was signed on as a personal moderator of the 8 E-News TV program, "Camp in Malaysia".

Beginning in 2005, Yap was host of Singapore's entertainment program "Project Superstar" through all three seasons the show aired.

In 2006, Malaysia's version of Chinese singing talent show "Project Superstar" began shooting and was also hosted by Yap.

On 1 September 2006, Yap debuted his first personal music album, "Yearning", produced by Nimbus Productions. This album is a collection of 10 Chinese songs, one Malaysian song, and two music videos. However, before he made films in 2005, he had two honorary mentions for top ten performers of the Great Leap Forward Award and top ten singers of the Excellence Award presentation ceremony.

His 2006 "care" successfully issued a debut album. The album sold more than is equal to that they are not a very successful singer. Gary has come to least popular places such as Kulim Town School Hall and Megamall Pinang, Perai, Butterworth for album publicity that time.

=== 2007–2008 ===
Yap continued his presence on 8 E-News and the second season of Project Superstar. On 1 October 2007, hey launched his second album, "Restart".

After Gary finished his first wave of Restart album publicity, he began to produce a drama called "Voice induction" and the preparation for the third seasons of Project Super Star.

Yap continued working hard on his music and two years later he had a breakthrough. His 'Restart' music album was very popular throughout the year 2008. Later on Gary continued his roles on 8 E-News and the third season of Project Superstar.

=== 2009 ===
In 2009, Yap began hosting a new singing talent show, "Ultimate Power Group". This new talent show is the first to produce the best group singers in Malaysia. All the participants of the show must sing in groups.

He launched a third album on 1 August 2009, "Courageous Love". With this album, he produced five hit songs and 3 music videos. The destinations that he went by this time was Perai Butterworth, Bukit Mertajam, Taiping, Alor Star, Melaka, Johore, and the capital's site, included The Mines, Selayang and Klang. Yap has also already gone to the newly opened shopping mall in the capital, Brem Mall.

=== 2010–2011 ===
Throughout 2010 and 2011, Yap continued hosting the second season of Ultimate Power Group singing show. Afterwards, he presided over a Hot Chef Boys' cooking and talent show. In October, a common theme with news events became "world environmental protection is everyone's responsibility". On 1 November 2010, Gary also jumped on the environmental protection bandwagon by producing "War E" EP, which contained three environmental tracks and two music videos.

By this time Yap debuts a new album, he is still travelling throughout Northern and Southern Malaysia for publicity. This environmental music album remained popular throughout the whole 2011 year. The destinations Gary visited this year were Penang, Perai Butterworth, Batu Pahat, Johor Bahru, Taiping, Alor Setar and the capital.

In 2011, Yap took part of an old society drama in the beginning of the year. After that, the singing program he hosted every year once again changed from "Ultimate Power Group" to "Ultimate Power Star". The new show layout allows for both solo and group participants to participate.

Yap's marriage planning program, "Happiness Task", broadcast in June.

=== 2012 ===
The new singing talent show he hosted again changed its name to "Ultimate Power Song." After 1 September, Yap released his fourth album, "Love or Not" (New Songs + Best Selection).

== Awards ==
Gary first came to prominence in 2001 as the Malaysian male champion of Star Search Singapore and was awarded a contract with MediaCorp. He was also a member of the five boy group band, PEACE. He returned to Malaysia in 2004, due to disagreements with the new manager and signed with 8TV. Yap has since hosted various programs on 8TV and ntv7. He was voted the most popular TV host at the 2010 Golden Awards.

== Music album ==
=== Personal album ===
- 1 September 2006 : "Yearning"
- 1 October 2007 : "Restart"
- 1 August 2009 : "Courageous Love"
- 15 September 2010 : "So Worry" (single song)
- 1 November 2010 : "War E" (EP)
- 20 August 2012 : "Love" (new song + selected)
