= The In-Laws (TV series) =

2011 Singaporean Chinese drama

- 麻婆斗妇
- Written by: Lau Ching Poon 刘清盆; Chen Siew Khoon 陈秀群
- Starring: Louise Lee; Rui En; Pierre Png; Cynthia Koh; Darren Lim; Belinda Lee; Jin Yinji
- Opening theme: 最简单的温柔 (The Simplest Touch) by 吴惠冰 Wu Hui Bing
- Ending theme: 路过 (Just Passing) by Cavin Soh
- Country of origin: Singapore
- Original language: Chinese
- No. of episodes: 35

Production
- Producer: Lai Lee Thin 赖丽婷
- Running time: approx. 45 minutes

Original release
- Network: MediaCorp Channel 8
- Release: 12 April – 30 May 2011

Related
- Be Happy; C.L.I.F.

The In-Laws (Chinese: 麻婆斗妇) is a Singaporean Chinese drama which was telecasted on Singapore's free-to-air channel, MediaCorp Channel 8. It stars Louise Lee, Rui En, Pierre Png, Cynthia Koh, Darren Lim, Belinda Lee & Jin Yinji as the casts of the series. It made its debut on 12 April 2011 and has ended on 30 May 2011. This drama serial consists of 35 episodes, and was screened on every weekday night at 9:00 pm. This drama serial was repeated on every Monday to Wednesday at 3:30 pm.

It stars the award-winning veteran Hong Kong actress Louise Lee who also acted in the locally produced Portrait of Home back in 2005.

The series title 麻婆斗妇 (ma po dou fu, literally translates as "old lady fights daughter-in-law") is a play on a spicy tofu and beef dish from Sichuan called "Pockmarked Lady's Beancurd" (麻婆豆腐).

== Cast ==
=== Xiao's family ===
Cast	Character	Description
Jin Yinji	He Xiangqin 何香琴	Xiao Fenfen's mother; Lin Baozhu's mother-in-law; Xiao Jianye and Xiao Jianhai's grandmother
Louise Lee	Lin Baozhu 林宝珠	Head of the family; Xiao Jianye and Xiao Jianhai's mother; Wang Jiazhen and Yan Qiuhua's mother-in-law
Belinda Lee	Xiao Fenfen 萧芬芬	He Xiangqin's daughter; Lin Baozhu's sister-in-law; Xiao Jianye and Xiao Jianhai's aunt
Darren Lim	Xiao Jianye 萧健业	Lin Baozhu's eldest son; Xiao Jianhai's elder brother; Yan Qiuhua's husband; Xiao Fenfen's nephew
Cynthia Koh	Yan Qiuhua 严秋桦	Xiao Jianye's wife
Pierre Png	Xiao Jianhai 萧健海	Lin Baozhu's youngest son; Xiao Jianye's younger brother; Wang Jiazhen's husband; Xiao Fenfen's nephew; Yan Qiuhua's brother-in-law; Wang Du's son-in-law
Rui En	Wang Jiazhen 王佳珍	Xiao Jianhai's wife; Lin Baozhu's daughter-in-law; Wang Du's daughter; Wang Jieqi's younger sister; Liang Xin's sister-in-law; Bai Zijun's ex-girlfriend; Nicknamed by Jianhai "Chawanmushi"

=== Wang's family ===
Cast	Character	Description
Richard Low	Wang Du 王堵	Father of Wang Jiazhen and Wang Jieqi; Xiao Jianhai and Liang Xin's father-in-law
Cavin Soh	Wang Jieqi 王杰奇	Wang Du's elder son; Wang Jiazhen's elder brother; Liang Xin's husband
Apple Hong	Liang Xin 梁芯	Wang Jieqi's wife; Wang Du's daughter-in-law; Wang Jiazhen's sister-in-law

=== Others ===
Cast	Character	Description
Terence Cao	Bai Zijun 白子俊	
May Phua	Luo Feifei 罗菲菲	Bai Zijun's wife
Louis Wu 伍洛毅	Da Bao 大宝	Xiao Fenfen's suitor

== Accolades ==
Year	Award	Category	Nominee / Work	Result	Ref
2012	Star Awards	Best Screenplay 最佳剧本	Chen Siew Khoon 陈秀群 and Lau Chin Poon 刘清盆	Won	
2012	Star Awards	Best Set Design for Drama Programmes 最佳戏剧布景设计	Chen Jiagu 陈家谷	Nominated	
2012	Star Awards	Favourite Onscreen Couple	Rui En and Pierre Png	Nominated	

== See also ==
- List of The In-Laws (TV series) episodes
