= Kongsi Raya (film) =

2022 Malaysian comedy-drama film

- Chinese: 姜味关系
- Directed by: Teddy Chin
- Starring: Wilson Lee; Qasrina Karim; Harith Iskander; Erra Fazira; Chew Kin Wah; Ong Ai Leng; Teddy Chin
- Production company: 555 Film
- Distributed by: GSC Movies
- Release date: February 3, 2022
- Running time: 102 minutes
- Country: Malaysia
- Languages: Cantonese; Malay; Mandarin; English

Kongsi Raya (Chinese: 姜味关系) is a 2022 Malaysian Malay-language comedy-drama film directed by Teddy Chin. It tells the story of a Chinese chef who is in love with a Malay TV producer, but their relationship faces objections from both of their long-feuding chef fathers. Things gets out of hand when the fathers decide to rival in a live TV cooking competition showdown.

It is released on 3 February 2022 in Malaysian cinemas. The film stars Wilson Lee, Qasrina Karim, Harith Iskander, Erra Fazira, Chew Kin Wah, Ong Ai Leng and Teddy Chin.

It is one of the five 2022 Malaysian and Singaporean Chinese New Year films, including Nasi Lemak 1.0 and Small Town Heroes (Malaysia), Ah Girls Go Army and Reunion Dinner (Singapore).

== Synopsis ==
The film tells the story of a young couple, Jack, a Chinese man and Sharifah, a Malay woman. Jack is a chef and manager of a restaurant owned by his father, who is a big chef. Sharifah is a TV programme producer for her father, Rahim, who is also a famous celebrity chef.

When they introduce themselves to their parents, both mothers approve them but both their fathers are shocked and opposed. Things became worse for both families when both chef dads challenge each other in all-out cooking competition that will go live on TV. Jack and Sharifah must find a solution before it gets out of hand. Can they mend and persuade their fathers to come in terms?

== Cast ==
- Wilson Lee as Jack / Siti
- Qasrina Karim as Sharifah
- Harith Iskander as Rahim
- Erra Fazira as Sarah
- Chew Kin Wah as Long Feng
- Ong Ai Leng as Zhen Jie
- Teddy Chin as Xiao Long
- Kyzer Tou as Khalil
- Amerul Affendi as Aziz

== Release ==
The film is directed by Teddy Chin. The title term Kongsi Raya refers to the years when the dates of Chinese New Year and Hari Raya Aidilfitri take place in the same period of time. This happens every 33 years due to Islamic calendar shifts. From 1996 to 1998, Chinese New Year and Hari Raya used to fall on the same week. This situation will repeat between 2029 and 2031. This term was coined and used in Malaysia and Singapore to commemorate the celebration of two festivals together.
