= Tsun Jin High School =

Chinese independent high school in Kuala Lumpur, Malaysia

- 吉隆坡循人中学
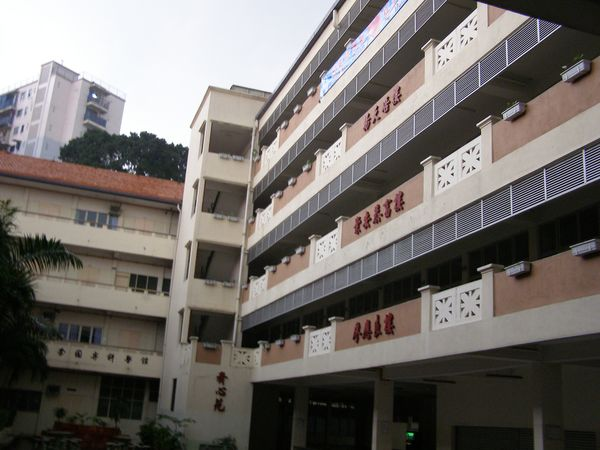
- School buildings

Location
- 6, Jalan Loke Yew; 55200 Kuala Lumpur; Malaysia

Information
- Type: Chinese independent high school
- Established: 1913
- Founder: Kuala Lumpur Fui Jiu Association (吉隆坡惠州会馆)
- Principal: Loh Hong Seng
- Faculty: 212
- Grades: Junior 1 to Senior 3
- Gender: Coeducational
- Enrolment: 3600± (2025)
- Classes: 62
- Language: Mandarin, Malay, English
- Website: tsunjin.edu.my

Tsun Jin High School
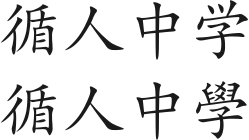
- Tsun Jin High School in Simplified Chinese (top) and Traditional Chinese (below) character
- Traditional Chinese: 循人中學
- Simplified Chinese: 循人中学
Transcriptions
Standard Mandarin
- Hanyu Pinyin: Jílóngpō Xúnrén Zhōngxué
Yue: Cantonese
- Jyutping: Gat^{1} Lung^{4} Bo^{1} Ceon^{4} Jan^{4} Zung^{1} Hok^{6}

Tsun Jin High School (Chinese: 吉隆坡循人中学) is a co-educational Chinese independent high school situated along Jalan Loke Yew in Kuala Lumpur, Malaysia, established in 1955. It was founded as an expansion of Tsun Jin Primary School, founded in 1913.

== History ==
Predecessors of The Selangor Fui Chiu Association founded the Tsun Jin Primary School in 1913. In the early 1950, to provide students with a holistic Chinese education and to pass on the Chinese culture, the Tsun Jin Board of Governors thus established an independent Chinese high school. The high school section was officially in operation in 1955. In 1962, many local Chinese schools opted for systemic reformation. Convinced of the unique and significant mission of the independent Chinese high school, the Tsun Jin Board of Governors resolved to stay in the noble course. Various construction plans have been sequentially implemented. Besides that, the school has celebrated its 60th anniversary in 2015 and the school held a performance on 25 and 26 July 2015. The school hired Beh Kim Chuan as the head director of the performance.

== Facilities ==
Today, the school's facilities include a library, 8 badminton courts, an air-conditioned hall with a capacity of 800 persons which provides a venue for concerts and lectures, and a main hall built in 2009 having a capacity of 2,500 persons. A music room is usually occupied by the choir society.

== Notable alumni ==
- Lee Ying Ha, politician
- Tracy Lee, actress
