= V-Focus =

- Promo poster
- 獨家保鑣
- Genre: Romance, Comedy, Mystery
- Created by: Sanlih E-Television
- Written by: Lin Pei Yu 林珮瑜 (Screenwriter coordinator); Chen Wen Zi 陳文梓; Liu Cun Ru 劉存茹; Wu Xiang Ying 吳香穎; Zhang Yi Ting 張貽婷
- Directed by: Eri Hao 郝心翔
- Starring: Melvin Sia 謝佳見; Ling Hung 洪小鈴; Huang Wei Ting 黃薇渟; Yorke Sun 孫沁岳
- Opening theme: Roll Your Eyes 翻白眼 by 831 八三夭
- Ending theme: Passing Smile 微笑帶過 by Shi Shi 孫盛希
- Country of origin: Republic of China (Taiwan)
- Original language: Mandarin
- No. of seasons: 1
- No. of episodes: 65

Production
- Producers: Fang Xiao Ren 方孝仁; Rong Jun Yi 戎俊義
- Production location: Taiwan
- Camera setup: Multi camera
- Running time: 60 minutes
- Production companies: 金牌合作影像製作股份有限公司; Sanlih E-Television 三立電視股份有限公司

Original release
- Network: SET Metro; EBC Variety
- Release: 26 October 2016 – 24 January 2017

Related
- Better Man; Just for You

V-Focus (Chinese: 獨家保鑣; pinyin: dú jiā bǎo biāo) is a 2016 Taiwanese television series starring Melvin Sia, Ling Hung, Huang Wei Ting and Yorke Sun. Filming began on September 21, 2016, and is filmed as it airs. The original broadcast began on October 26, 2016, on SET Metro, airing weekdays (Monday through Friday) at 8:00 pm.

== Synopsis ==
They are enemies in their professional lives. Chiang Chih Heng (Melvin Sia) is a former mercenary who now is known as “The Bodyguard.” He is the owner of Krisis, a security consultancy company that protects public figures who are chased by the paparazzi. Ting Ruo Chin (Huang Wei Ting) is nicknamed the “Variety Queen” for her dogged ability to chase down celebrity gossip exclusives as a tabloid journalist for “V-Focus.” On their way to a news event, Chih Heng and Ruo Chin become stranded on a desert island together. What will become of these professional enemies?

== Cast ==
=== Main cast ===
- Melvin Sia 謝佳見 as Jiang Zhi Heng 姜至衡
  - ?? as young Zhi Heng
- Ling Hung 洪小鈴 as Zhou Xin Yi 周心儀
  - ?? as young Xin Yi
- Huang Wei Ting 黃薇渟 as Ding Ruo Qin 丁若芹
- Yorke Sun 孫沁岳 as Ke Guo Long 柯國隆
  - Qiu Chen En 邱辰恩 as young Guo Long

=== Supporting cast ===
- Angela Lee 李佳豫 as Jiang Wen Li 蔣文莉
- Hao-Hsuan Hsu 徐浩軒 as Huang Zi Kai 黃子凱
- Tannie Huang 黃妤榛 as Cai Pei Zhen 蔡佩真 (Ella)
- Huang Zheng Hao 黃政浩 as Gao Chao Qun 高超群
- Ryan Kuo 郭鑫 as Liu Ming Lei 劉明磊
- William Yang 楊永維 as Eagle
- Hank Wang 王淮仲 as Zhao Jia Rui 趙家銳
- Lin Jun Yong 林埈永 as Marten
- Chen Xun 陳勳 as Condor

=== Cameos ===
- Jerry Huang 黃志瑋 as Wu Jian Ye 吳建業
- Amanda Liu as reporter
- Pei Pei 佩佩 as Yang Fen Fen 楊芬芬
- Stephenie Lim 林美貞 as Bai Jia Qi 白佳琪
- Jacko Chiang 蔣偉文 as He Cheng Zhang 賀成章
- Chang Han 張翰 as Wang Qing Hua 王清華
- Alina Fang Ting Alina 芳婷 as Xiao Jie 小潔
- Hank Wu as Li Bing Huang 李秉皇
- Brian Pien 邊權 as Daniel
- Michael Tao 陶傳正 as Wen Li's father
- David Chiu 邱昊奇 as Li Pin Yi 李品逸
- Yang Yu Qi 楊煜奇 as priest
- Wei Yi 惟毅 as Wang Chong Guang 王崇光
- Fu Lei 傅雷 as Zhou Tie Xiong 周鐵雄
- Lin Xiu Jun 林秀君 as Zhou Chen Xin 周陳心蘭
- Bruce Chen 陳為民 as Pin Yi's manager
- Yi Tian 竩恬 as Yang Ke Xin 楊可欣
- Ti-Men Kan 乾德門 as noodle stand owner
- Zhang Yu Ci 張淯詞 as Ci Ci 慈慈
- Wu Jing Lin 吳京麟 as skater boy
- Ally Chiu 邱偲琹 as Du Xiao Shu 杜曉書 (Tina)
- ?? as Jiang Yue Ru 姜月如
- Wang Xiao Cheng 王孝程 as Wang Biao 王驫
- Yvonne Yao 姚采穎 as Sister Ling 玲姐
- ?? as Xiao He 小何
- Daniel Tsai 蔡力允 as Fu Shao Dong 傅紹東
- Shen Meng-Sheng 沈孟生 as Liang Zhao Xiang 梁兆祥
- Wu Tao 吳濤 as Li Bao Sheng 李寶生
- Wang Qian 王謙 as Xin Yi's ex-boyfriend
- ?? as Wang Tai Shan 王泰山
- Wei Wen Liang 魏文良 as Qian Jin Da 錢晉達
- Fifi Wang 王偊菁 as news anchor
- Jack Lee 李運慶 as He Hao Xuan 何浩軒
- Anny Lin 林容安 as news anchor
- Lo Pei-An 羅北安 as Ou Guo Liang 歐國良
- Yuan Xiao Wan 苑曉琬 as news anchor
- Wang De Sheng 王德生 as Li You De 李友德
- Derek Chang 張軒睿 as Tiger

== Soundtrack ==
V-Focus Original TV Soundtrack (OST)

Soundtrack album by Various artists
- Released: 30 December 2016
- Genre: Mandopop
- Language: Mandarin
- Label: Rock Records

V-Focus Original TV Soundtrack (OST) (獨家保鑣 原聲帶) was released on December 30, 2016, by various artists under Rock Records. It contains 10 tracks total, in which 8 songs are various instrumental versions of the songs. The opening theme is track 1 "Roll Your Eyes 翻白眼" by 831 八三夭, while the closing theme is track 2 "Passing Smile 微笑帶過" by Shi Shi 孫盛希.

=== Track listing ===
No.	Title	Singer(s)	Length
1.	"Roll Your Eyes" (翻白眼)	831 八三夭	3:15
2.	"Passing Smile" (微笑帶過)	Shi Shi 孫盛希	4:23
3.	Untitled (獨家振奮)	Instrumental	2:50
4.	Untitled (獨家浪漫)	Instrumental	2:39
5.	Untitled (獨家夢幻)	Instrumental	3:09
6.	Untitled (獨家雀躍)	Instrumental	3:04
7.	Untitled (獨家擁抱)	Instrumental	3:05
8.	Untitled (獨家微笑)	Instrumental	2:58
9.	Untitled (獨家幽默)	Instrumental	3:02
10.	Untitled (獨家溫暖)	Instrumental	3:02

Songs not featured on the official soundtrack album.

- Skater Kids Won't Be Bad 玩滑板的孩子不會變壞 by 831 八三夭
- That Last Day 塌下來 by Shi Shi 孫盛希
- Suspicion 嫌疑 by Shi Shi 孫盛希
- Where Will You Go by Shi Shi 孫盛希
- Disappeared 不見了 by Nine Chen 陳零九

== Broadcast ==
Network	Country	Airing Date	Timeslot
SET Metro	Taiwan	October 26, 2016	Monday to Friday 8:00-9:00 pm
EBC Variety	Taiwan	October 26, 2016	Monday to Friday 9:00-10:00 pm
Astro; Shuang Xing	Malaysia	October 27, 2016	Monday to Friday 6:00-7:00 pm
VV Drama	Singapore	November 4, 2016	Monday to Friday 7:00-8:00 pm
UNTV	Philippines	This 2021	TBA

== Episode ratings ==
Competing dramas on rival channels airing at the same time slot were:

- SET Taiwan - Taste of Life
- FTV - Spring Flower
- TTV - Fighting Meiling, All in 700
- CTV - The Age of Innocence, Let It Fly
- CTS - W

Air Date	Episodes	Weekly Average Ratings	Rank
Oct 26–28, 2016	1-3	0.80	4
Oct 31-Nov 4, 2016	4-8	0.98	3
Nov 7–11, 2016	9-13	0.96	3
Nov 14–18, 2016	14-18	1.04	3
Nov 21–25, 2016	19-23	1.18	3
Nov 28-Dec 2, 2016	24-28	1.22	3
Dec 5–9, 2016	29-33	1.20	3
Dec 12–16, 2016	34-38	1.22	3
Dec 19–23, 2016	39-43	1.08	3
Dec 26–30, 2016	44-48	1.30	3
Jan 2–6, 2017	49-53	1.33	3
Jan 9–13, 2017	54-58	1.33	3
Jan 16–20, 2017	59-63	1.31	3
Jan 23–24, 2017	64-65	1.50	3
Average ratings		--	--

== Awards and nominations ==
Year	Ceremony	Category	Nominee	Result
2016	2016 Sanlih Drama Awards	Viewers Choice Drama Award	V-Focus	Nominated
2016	2016 Sanlih Drama Awards	Best Actor Award	Melvin Sia	Nominated
2016	2016 Sanlih Drama Awards	Best Actress Award	Ling Hung	Nominated
2016	2016 Sanlih Drama Awards	Best Kiss Award	Melvin Sia & Huang Wei Ting	Nominated
2016	2016 Sanlih Drama Awards	Best Screen Couple Award	Melvin Sia & Huang Wei Ting	Nominated
2016	2016 Sanlih Drama Awards	China Wave Award	Melvin Sia	Won
