= Be Happy (TV series) =

Singaporean TV series

- 生日快乐
- Written by: Winnie Wong 王尤红; Lim Gim Lan 林锦兰
- Starring: Fann Wong; Chen Hanwei; Zhang Yaodong; Paige Chua; Guo Liang; Vivian Lai; Zen Chong; Apple Hong; Wayne Chua
- Opening theme: "向爱拥抱" by Fann Wong and Chen Hanwei
- Ending theme: "忙" by Fann Wong
- Country of origin: Singapore
- Original language: Chinese
- No. of episodes: 20 (list of episodes)

Production
- Producer: Winnie Wong 王尤红
- Running time: approx. 45 minutes

Original release
- Network: MediaCorp Channel 8
- Release: 15 March – 11 April 2011

Related
- A Tale of 2 Cities; The In-Laws

Be Happy (simplified Chinese: 生日快乐; traditional Chinese: 生日快樂) is a Singaporean Chinese drama which was telecasted on Singapore's free-to-air channel, MediaCorp Channel 8. It stars Fann Wong, Chen Hanwei, Zhang Yaodong, Paige Chua, Guo Liang, Vivian Lai, Zen Chong, Apple Hong & Wayne Chua as the casts of the series. It made its debut on 15 March 2011 and ended on 11 April 2011. This drama serial consists of 20 episodes, and was screened on every weekday night at 9.00 pm. This drama would be the second drama to be broadcast in Dolby Digital after Breakout.

== Cast ==
Artiste	Character	Description
Fann Wong	Xiao Kaixin	Nicknamed 'Big S', Xiao is a former cancer patient who uses a wheelchair and works as a radio deejay.
Chen Hanwei	Zhang Weijian	Former copywriter in advertising firm, now still a copywriter in another office
Paige Chua	Bai Xiuming	Weijian's wife, works in interior design company
Zhang Yaodong	Cheng Fang	Doctor, became Big S's husband
Guo Liang	Lan Yanzhi	Boss of interior design company
Vivian Lai	Mable	Big S's younger sister-in-law
Apple Hong	Josephine	Lackey of Ken
Zen Chong	Ken See	See is the former boss of advertising firm
Wayne Chua	Wang Jingjing	Cheng Fang's ex-girlfriend
Chen Huihui		

== See also ==
- List of Be Happy episodes
- List of programmes broadcast by Mediacorp Channel 8
