= Love at Risk =

- 爱情风险
- Genre: Drama; Romance
- Created by: Tang Yeow 陈耀; Cheong Yan Peng 张彦平
- Starring: Tay Ping Hui; Joanne Peh; Kate Pang; Zhang Yao Dong; Xiang Yun; Shane Pow
- Opening theme: 爱情风险 by Wei En
- Ending theme: 一首没唱完的情歌 by Wei En
- Country of origin: Singapore
- Original language: Chinese
- No. of episodes: 20

Production
- Producer: Jasmine Woo 邬毓琳
- Running time: approx. 45 minutes (exc. advertisements)

Original release
- Network: MediaCorp Channel 8
- Release: 5 August – 30 August 2013

Related
- The Dream Makers; Sudden

Love At Risk (stylised as Love@Risk, Chinese: 爱情风险) is a Mediacorp Channel 8 romance drama that will broadcast from 5 August 2013 to 30 August 2013 and consist of 20 episodes. It stars Tay Ping Hui, Joanne Peh, Kate Pang, Zhang Yao Dong, Xiang Yun & Shane Pow as casts of the series. The show aired at 9pm on weekdays and had a repeat telecast at 8am the following day.

== Cast ==
- Tay Ping Hui as Wu Qishan a.k.a. 573
- Joanne Peh as Xin Si Si
- Kate Pang as Liao Meihao
- Zhang Yao Dong as Wang Li'an
- Xiang Yun as Shi Sanmei
- Shane Pow as Liao Yuanman
- Tracy Lee as Wu Qiyu a.k.a. 571
- Wee Kheng Ming as Hao Jiyi
- May Phua as Lu Huiting
- Hong Hui Fang as Fu Meili (Beauty Foo)
- Brandon Wong as Hei-ge
- Bryan Chan as Wang Yacai (Chicken King)
- Priscelia Chan as Peng Nana
- Ye Shipin as Xin Xiaotian
- Tan Tiow Im as Xu Dadi
- Hu Wensui as Benson

== Accolades ==
Organisation	Year	Category	Nominee / Work	Result	Ref
Star Awards	2014	Young Talent Award	Tan Shi Ya 陈诗雅	Nominated	
Star Awards	2014	Best Supporting Actress	Hong Hui Fang	Nominated	

== See also ==
- List of programmes broadcast by Mediacorp Channel 8
- List of Love At Risk episodes
