= Lion.Hearts =

Television series

- 谈谈情，舞舞狮
- Starring: Cai Pei Xuan; Berg Lee
- Music by: 单
- Countries of origin: Malaysia; Singapore
- Original language: Mandarin
- No. of episodes: 30

Production
- Running time: approx. 45 minutes

Original release
- Network: ntv7 (Malaysia); MediaCorp Channel 8 (Singapore)
- Release: 19 January 2009 – 2009

Related
- Addicted To Love; The Iron Lady

Lion.Hearts (谈谈情，舞舞狮) is the eleventh international co-production of MediaCorp TV and ntv7. It is a Chinese New Year themed drama which follows the life of young lion dancers. The romantic comedy boasts fast-paced action in the form of traditional Chinese lion dance.

== Cast ==
- Wayne Chua (Cai Pei Xuan)
- Berg Lee
- Tracy Lee
- Melvin Sia
- William San
- Ko Hung
- Leslie Chai
- Janelle Chin
- Phua Chee Kin
- Zhang Wei
- Monday Kang
