= List of The In-Laws (TV series) episodes =

Below is an episodic synopsis of The In-Laws, which consists of 35 episodes and broadcast on MediaCorp Channel 8. The series debuted on 12 April 2011 and ended on 30 May 2011.

== Episodes ==
No.	Title	Original release date	Encore date	Rating
1	"Episode 1"	April 12, 2011	February 1, 2012	PG
2	"Episode 2"	April 13, 2011	February 2, 2012	PG
3	"Episode 3"	April 14, 2011	February 3, 2012	PG
4	"Episode 4"	April 15, 2011	February 6, 2012	PG
5	"Episode 5"	April 18, 2011	February 7, 2012	PG
6	"Episode 6"	April 19, 2011	February 8, 2012	PG
7	"Episode 7"	April 20, 2011	February 9, 2012	PG
8	"Episode 8"	April 21, 2011	February 10, 2012	PG
9	"Episode 9"	April 22, 2011	February 13, 2012	PG
10	"Episode 10"	April 25, 2011	February 14, 2012	PG
11	"Episode 11"	April 26, 2011	February 15, 2012	PG
12	"Episode 12"	April 27, 2011	February 16, 2012	PG
13	"Episode 13"	April 28, 2011	February 17, 2012	PG
14	"Episode 14"	April 29, 2011	February 20, 2012	PG
15	"Episode 15"	May 2, 2011	February 21, 2012	PG
16	"Episode 16"	May 3, 2011	February 22, 2012	PG
17	"Episode 17"	May 4, 2011	February 23, 2012	PG
18	"Episode 18"	May 5, 2011	February 24, 2012	PG
19	"Episode 19"	May 6, 2011	February 27, 2012	PG
20	"Episode 20"	May 9, 2011	February 28, 2012	PG
21	"Episode 21"	May 10, 2011	February 29, 2012	PG
22	"Episode 22"	May 11, 2011	March 1, 2012	PG
23	"Episode 23"	May 12, 2011	March 2, 2012	PG
24	"Episode 24"	May 13, 2011	March 5, 2012	PG
25	"Episode 25"	May 16, 2011	March 6, 2012	PG
26	"Episode 26"	May 17, 2011	March 7, 2012	PG
27	"Episode 27"	May 18, 2011	March 8, 2012	PG
28	"Episode 28"	May 19, 2011	March 9, 2012	PG
29	"Episode 29"	May 20, 2011	March 12, 2012	PG
30	"Episode 30"	May 23, 2011	March 13, 2012	PG
31	"Episode 31"	May 24, 2011	March 14, 2012	PG
32	"Episode 32"	May 25, 2011	March 15, 2012	PG
33	"Episode 33"	May 26, 2011	March 16, 2012	PG
34	"Episode 34"	May 27, 2011	March 19, 2012	PG
35	"Episode 35 (Finale)"	May 30, 2011	March 20, 2012	PG

== See also ==
- List of programmes broadcast by Mediacorp Channel 8
- The In-Laws (TV series)
