= Melvin Sia =

- 謝佳見
- Born: Melvin Sia Ka Kiong; 14 June 1979 (age 47); Sarawak, Malaysia
- Education: University of Technology Malaysia
- Occupations: Actor, singer, model
- Years active: 2003–present
- Awards: Golden Awards; Best Actor & Most Popular Actor (2010)
- Musical career
- Also known as: 谢佳剑
- Label: HIM International Music

Melvin Sia

Chinese name
- Traditional Chinese: 謝佳見
- Simplified Chinese: 谢佳剑
- Hanyu Pinyin: Xiè Jiājiàn
- Hokkien POJ: Siā Ka-kiàn
- Tâi-lô: Siā Ka-kiàn

Melvin Sia (born 14 June 1979) is a Malaysian actor, model and singer. He won the Best Actor Award at the Malaysia Golden Awards for his role in Romantic Delicacies. He also won Most Popular Actor in Viewers' Choice category in the same award.

== Career ==
Sia studied architecture at Universiti Teknologi Malaysia before joining the Malaysian regional edition of Star Search 2003 and went into showbiz after finishing in the top 6. In 2010 he won the Best Actor Award, his first acting award, at the inaugural Golden Awards.

He has starred in a number of telemovies and also made his Singapore cinema debut in Dance Dance Dragon opposite veterans Adrian Pang, Dennis Chew and Kym Ng. Recently, he made his debut in a mainland idol drama through Love Destiny alongside Qi Wei, iPartment stars Chen He, Lou Yixiao and many more. The 86-episode drama was directed by Taiwanese director Chen Wei-ling, who also directed high ratings Taiwanese idol dramas such as Autumn's Concerto, Material Queen.

Sia as Hei Long Ho 2025

== Filmography ==
=== Dramas ===
- TBA 《谢佳见》The Good Manager
- 2021 《酷盖爸爸》Papa & Daddy
- 2020 《 半是蜜糖半是伤》Love Is Sweet
- 2019 《你愛的台灣》Taiwan That You Love
- 2019《男神時代》The Way We Love
- 2017《親愛的王子大人》Dear Prince
- 2017 () Die Now
- 2016《獨家保鏢》V-Focus
- 2016《遺憾拼圖》Life of List
- 2015《致，第三者》To the Dearest Intruder
- 2014《我的寶貝四千金》Dear mother
- 2014《魔女搶頭婚天》Boysitter (TV series)
- 2014《16個夏天》The Way We Were
- 2012《爱情自有天意》Love Destiny
- 2011《时光电台》Time FM
- 2010《渔米人家》The Seeds of Life
- 2010《声空感应II》Good Night DJ II
- 2010《浮生劫》Tribulations of Life
- 2009《碳乡》Glowing Embers
- 2009《有爱。有梦。有明天》Kasih Impian Harapan
- 2009《我爱麻糍》Friends Forever
- 2009《美食厨师男》Romantic Delicacies
- 2008《大城市小浪漫》Love in the Big City
- 2008《谈谈情，舞舞狮》Lion.Hearts (Malaysian TV series)
- 2008《都市恋人的追逐》Addicted to Love
- 2008《情牵南苑》Age of Glory (Malaysian TV series)
- 2007《爱在你左右》Love Is All Around
- 2007《阳光梦田》Impian Halaman Sekinchan
- 2006《原点》The Beginning (TV series)
- 2005《迷情追踪》Misteri
- 2005《温馨新年情》
- 2005《闺家欢喜》
- 2004《梦的边缘》
- 2004《落翅天使》Memori Cinta Semalam
- 2004《灵犀草》Rumput Jiwa
- 2004《迤逦人生》
- 2003《快递情缘》
- 2003《听青春的声音》Irama Remaja

=== Movies / Films ===
- 2022《售命》Life for Sale
- 2017《请爱我的女朋友》Please Love Her
- 2014 I Am Beautiful
- 2013 Ge Mei Lia
- 2012《甲洞》 Kepong Gangster
- 2012《龙众舞》Dance Dance Dragon
- 2010《媒人帮》The Superb Match Makers
- 2005《第三代》Third Generation

=== Theatre ===
- 2011《那就爱吧！》Let's Love
- 2010《恋爱之第100天》JE T'AIME 100 Days

== Album ==
- Reunion 178

== CF / Print Ads ==
- 2010 Jonnie Walker TVC
- 2010 HP Infomercial
- 2007 Winter Time TVC
- 2007 Total Image Collagen TVC
- 2007 Canon TVC
- 2006 Thompson Ginkgo TVC
- 2006 Toshiba Plasma TV TVC
- 2006 VISA Eon Bank Group Print Ad and TVC
- 2006 房地产 Print Ad
- 2005 Natural Oil TVC
- 2005 Maxis Hotlink Print Ad
- 2003 Excel Isotonic Drink Print Ad and TVC

== Awards and nominations ==
Organisation	Year	Category	Nominee(s)	Result	Ref
Golden Awards	2010	Best Actor	Melvin Sia	Won	
