= Fallen Angel (Singaporean-Malaysian TV series) =

- Genre: Modern Drama
- Starring: Shaun Chen; Wayne Chua; Tiffany Leong
- Countries of origin: Singapore; Malaysia
- Original language: Chinese
- No. of episodes: 25

Original release
- Network: ntv7 (Malaysia); MediaCorp Channel 8 (Singapore)
- Release: 2007

Related
- The Beautiful Scent; Love Is All Around; Wings of Desire

Fallen Angel (Chinese: 天使的烙印) is a Mandarin Chinese episodic drama produced jointly by Singaporean broadcaster MediaCorp TV and Malaysian broadcaster Media Prima Berhad. It was telecasted on Singapore's free-to-air channel, MediaCorp Channel 8. It made its debut on 6 July 2007 and ended on 30 August 2007. This drama serial consists of 25 episodes, and was screened on every weekend night at 7:00 pm to 9:00 pm.

It was the first joint production between the two companies, and is a remake of Television Corporation of Singapore (now MediaCorp) drama Wings Of Desire.

== Synopsis ==
In Fallen Angel, 2 hostesses with a sad past lead 2 very different lives. Yong Yi, who chose to forget her past, is happy and carefree. Kai Qing, on the other hand, keeps her sad memories close to her heart and is revengeful and bitter. Yong Yi and Xuewen are childhood friends who grew up together. Xuewen has secretly been in love with Yong Yi since they were kids, and has always stayed by her side to watch over her. Yong Yi’s parents run a fruit stall at the market. Her father Hu Gang and mother Mei Feng are widely known as a kind-hearted couple who are always willing to lend a helping hand.

Kai Qing is born to the rich Zhang clan. Romantically linked with her cousin Zi Yang since they were young, the two are regarded as the perfect couple. During a chance encounter, Kai Qing makes the acquaintance of Yong Yi and Xuewen. The three young people get along very well and become good friends. Through Kai Qing, Yong Yi gets to know Zi Yang. The latter two are deeply impressed with each other. Kai Yuan is the eldest grandson of the Zhang clan, and therefore the rightful heir to the family business. Unfortunately, he is also an immature and boastful young man. His grandfather Zhang Da Zhong finds himself unable to place much faith in Kai Yuan. Thus, Kai Yuan’s aunt Qiu Yue is put in charge of running Zhang Holdings. This makes Kai Yuan resent Qiu Yue, as he feels that she has no right to helm the family business. Thus, Kai Yuan often pits himself against Qiu Yue and Zi Yang just to spite them.

== Cast ==
Cast	Role	Description
Shaun Chen	Ye Zi Yang	
Zen Chong	Chen Xue Wen	
Wayne Chua	(Zhang) Hu Yong Yi	
Tiffany Leong	Zhang Kai Qing	
Kelvin Liew	Zhang Kai Yuan	
Loo Aye Keng	Yang Qiu Yue	
Li Wenhai	Hu Gang	
Ye Li Yi 叶丽仪	Mei Feng	
Zhang Wei	Zhang Da Zhong	
	Ye Si Qing	
