= The Queen (Singaporean TV series) =

Singaporean TV series

- 复仇女王
- Genre: Emotion; Police procedural Revenge; Thriller; Action; Vigilance; Crime
- Created by: Ho Hee Ann 何启安
- Written by: Wawa Creative Team 哇哇创作组
- Directed by: 霍志楷 谢光华 韩耀光
- Starring: Jesseca Liu; Priscelia Chan; Vivian Lai; Apple Hong; Jayley Woo
- Opening theme: 看我的 (Watch Me Now) by Selina
- Ending theme: 信爱成瘾 (Love Addiction) by Ella Chen 放不下的活著 (Holding On) by The Freshman
- Country of origin: Singapore
- Original language: Mandarin
- No. of episodes: 20 (list of episodes)

Production
- Producer: Molby Low Kian Chye 刘健财
- Running time: 1-Hour (21:00-21:59 SST)
- Production company: Wawa Pictures

Original release
- Network: Channel 8 HD
- Release: 18 February – 16 March 2016

The Queen (Chinese: 复仇女王, previously titled The Revenge Queen) is a Singapore Mandarin police procedural which was produced by Wawa Pictures and telecast on Singapore's free-to-air channel, Channel 8 HD. Twenty episodes were produced, with production occurring over 108 days in 2015. It debuted Thursday, 18 February 2016. It stars Jesseca Liu, Priscelia Chan, Vivian Lai, Apple Hong & Jayley Woo as the casts of this series.

== Cast ==
=== Revenge Queen ===
Cast	Role	Description	Episodes Appeared
Jesseca Liu 刘子绚	Guan Xin 关欣	Guan is the Revenge Queen (复仇女王) and also as the group Revenge Queen's secret leader, In her normal life, she is Zhang Xiaofeng, Zeng Jing, Wu Kai En and Ni Qiaowen's boss. She seeks revenge against her younger brother-in-law, Mark, for causing the death of her younger sister. She turned against her husband, He Guoping, after Revenge Queen is framed by the police for murder of Zhuang Meifang. Her identity as Revenge Queen was finally known to her husband, He, after she was framed for murder of Mark and handcuffed him. She was subsequently threatened by Hong Yan to kill the Revenge Queen members but managed to trick Hong instead. In a final confrontation with Hong, Guan was arrested by her husband and was sentenced to 7 years in jail with the rest of the members of Revenge Queen. She gave birth to He Tianqing while in prison.	1-20
Priscelia Chan 曾诗梅	Zhang Xiaofeng 张晓风	Main Protagonist; Taxi driver Li Bingqiang's ex-wife & enemy Zhou Shanhong's love interest Revenge Queen's team member Beaten up by Li Bingqiang 3 years ago Gets her revenge against Li Bingqiang and saved Guan Xin in the process in Episode 8 Arrested in Episode 20 and got jailed for 7 years along with the other Revenge Queen members	1-20
Vivian Lai 赖怡伶	Zeng Jing 曾静	Main Protagonist; Martial art expert Massage therapist Thirty-sixth descendant of the E Mei Troupe; Revenge Queen's team member Zhao Xianghai's girlfriend, unknowingly he is a "Masked Man" & a member from Xin Yi gang Met Xianghai in episode 12; Quits Revenge Queen after choosing love with Xianghai over friendship in Episode 15; Died in episode 16 after being kicked in the chest by Xianghai (Deceased - Episode 16)	1-17
Apple Hong 洪乙心	Ni Qiaowen 倪巧雯	Main Protagonist; Guo Wenbin's ex-wife Cindy's ex-rival in love Formerly in love with Jason until she realises Jason's evil deeds Almost killed herself in Episode 1 Attacked by Wenbin in Episode 3 Housewife; ex-accountant Revenge Queen's team member Arrested in Episode 20 and got jailed for 7 years along with the other Revenge Queen members	1-20
Jayley Woo 胡佳琪	Wu Kai En 吴凯恩	Main Protagonist; Revenge Queen's team member Raped few years before by Liu Zhenyang; Arrested in Episode 20 and got jailed for 7 years along with the other Revenge Queen members	1-20

=== Other cast ===
Cast	Role	Description	Episodes Appeared
Darren Lim 林明伦	He Guoping 贺国平	Guan Xin's husband He Tianqing's father Police Superintendent; Zhang Minghui's boss Starts to suspect Guan Xin spying on him Knew that Guan Xin caused Mark to get paralyzed in Episode 14; Finally faced off against his wife in Episode 18 after Guan Xin was framed from killing Mark by being lured into a room Attacked by Xianghai and then kidnapped by Hong Yan in Episode 19; Placed in the tub with water flowing and got saved eventually in Episode 20; Shot down & killed Xianghai while attempting to run away from Guoping; Arrested his wife in Episode 20	1-2, 4-20
Xu Bin 徐彬	Zhang Minghui 张明辉	Police; Former Undercover police to be a member of Xin Yi gang few years ago Hong Yan's love interest 3 years ago, now turned rival Hong-dou's love interest but indirectly killed Hong-dou after being ordered to kill by Hong Yan & Wang Dalong; Caused Hong Yan to be imprisoned In love with Wu Kaien; Protected Kai En from getting stabbed by Liu Zhenyang in Episode 19; Eventually got accepted by Kai En in Episode 20	3-7, 9-20
Michelle Chia 谢韵仪	Hong Yan 洪雁	Main Villain; Gang leader of Xin Yi gang Zhang Minghui's love interest turned rival Indirectly killed Hong-dou after mistakenly framed Hong-dou for betraying Xin Yi gang Went to jail 3 years ago after being arrested by Zhang Minghui led police An eye for revenge to her enemies Released from jail in episode 15; Kidnapped Kai En and killed Wang Dalong in episode 16; Kidnapped Guoping in Episode 19; Threatened Guan Xin to kill the members of the Revenge Queen in exchange for Guoping but fell for the trick by Guan Xin; Arrested in Episode 20 while facing off with Guan Xin again This is Chia's first role as a villain.	9 (voice), 11-12, 14-20
Daren Tan 陈轩昱	Zhao Xianghai 赵向海	Main Villain; Masked man Zeng Jing's boyfriend but left her when he went to US; Member of Xin Yi gang Faced off against Guan Xin in Episode 10 and again in Episode 12; Met Zeng Jing in episode 12; Killed Zeng Jing in Episode 16; Attacked and kidnapped Guoping in Episode 19; Killed by Guoping in Episode 20 while attempting to flee (Deceased - Episode 20)	10 (masked), 12-20
Jeffrey Xu 徐鸣杰	Liu Zhenyang 刘振阳	Mentally Unstable Villain; Dentist; Mentally unstable due to stress in school and left house after quarreling with his parents; causing him to rape Kai En; Wu Kai En's love interest Zhang Minghui's rival in love Tried to get close to Kai En to atone his mistakes Killed Biao-ge in Episode 17; Kidnapped Kai En and told her the truth in Episode 18; Stabbed Minghui who is protecting Kai En and got arrested in Episode 19 (Arrested - Episode 19)	5, 12-15, 17-19
Zhang Xinxiang	Wang Dalong 汪大龙	Villain; Xin Yi gang's Second-In-Command; Shot by Hong Yan and died in episode 16 (Deceased - Episode 16)	10, 12-16
Johnson Low 刘铨盛	Mark Tan	Villain; Guan Ying's husband Guan Xin's younger brother-in-law & enemy Caused Guan Ying to be mentally ill and subsequently death due to greed Gets knocked down by a car and went into a coma while attempting to flee to another country Woke up from a coma in Episode 8 Regained memory but paralyzed Told Guoping that Guan Xin caused him to get knocked down by the car in Episode 14; Killed by Hong Yan & Zhao Xianghai in Episode 18 (Deceased - Episode 18)	1, 5-6, 8-9, 14-15, 18

=== Cameo appearances ===
Cast	Role	Description	Episodes Appeared
Sheila Sim 沈惠怡	Guan Ying 关颖	Guan Xin's younger sister Mark's wife Detests Guan Xin due to Mark "affair" with Guan Xin; Mentally ill caused by Mark; Nursing home patient Passed away by committing suicide in Episode 8 (Deceased - Episode 8)	1-7
Bernard Tan 陈传之	Guo Wenbin 郭文斌	Ni Qiaowen's ex-husband Deceived Ni Qiaowen and divorced her in episode 1 In cahoots with Peter; In love with Cindy; Kidnapped and attacked by Revenge Queen; John's rival in love Was attacked by John realizing Cindy had deceived him and is paralyzed for life	1-3
Joey Feng 冯瑾瑜	Cindy	Guo Wenbin's mistress Deceived Guo Wenbin by lying her baby is his Kidnapped by Revenge Queen; In love with John; Was arrested with John at the airport in episode 2 (Arrested - Episode 2)	1-2
Louis Wu 伍洛毅	Peter	Had an affair with Ni Qiaowen so that Guo Wenbin can divorce her	1
David Leong 梁家豪	Jason	Villain; Cheated money from Ni Qiaowen through investments Chen Zijian's enemy Stabbed by Zijian in episode 7	3-7
Dylan Quek 郭景豪	John	In love with Cindy; Cindy's baby's father Guo Wenbin's rival in love Injured Wenbin and was arrested at the airport in episode 2 (Arrested - Episode 2)	2
Zen Chong 章证翔	Chen Zijian 陈子健	Villain; Liu Shuangshuang's ex-husband but later Zhou Yutong's boyfriend Liang Anqi's husband Caused the imprisonment of Liu Shuangshuang and the death of his father Caused the death of Liang Anqi in Episode 5 Stabbed Jason and was arrested in episode 7. He was eventually sentenced to death for the murders he committed. (Arrested - Episode 7)	3-7
Mei Xin 陈美心	Zhou Yutong 周雨彤	Tong-tong, Victoria; Chen Zijian's ex-wife Imprison for 3 years Went to Korea for plastic surgery Ah Jie's secret admirer Revealed she's Liu Shuangshuang to Zijian in episode 7 and went to the Aegean Sea with Ah Jie	3-7
Priscilla Lim 林茜茜	Liu Shuangshuang 刘双双	Tong-tong, Victoria; Chen Zijian's ex-wife Imprison for 3 years Went to Korea for plastic surgery Ah Jie's secret admirer Revealed she's Liu Shuangshuang to Zijian in episode 7 and went to the Aegean Sea with Ah Jie	3-7
Silver Ang 洪子惠	Liang Anqi 梁安琪	Chen Zijian's wife Jason's girlfriend Zhou Yutong's rival in love Strangled and then thrown to death from 2nd floor by Zijian due to Zijian's divorce and affair with Zhou Yutong in episode 5 (Deceased - Episode 5)	3-6
James Hu 胡问遂	Ah Jie 阿杰	Liu Shuangshuang's/Zhou Yutong's, Liang Anqi's colleague Likes Liu Shuangshuang; Went to the Aegean Sea with Yutong in episode 7	4-5, 7
Lim Weiwen 林伟文	Zhou Shanhong/Chew Shanhong 周善宏	Zhuang Meifang's husband Zhang Xiaofeng's love interest Rongkang's father Assaulted and bullied by his wife often Lost his job and turned into househusband	5-12, 17-18
Darius Tan 陈日成	Li Bingqiang 李炳强	Zhang Xiaofeng's ex-husband 3 years ago Assaulted and bullied Xiaofeng; Went to jail 3 years ago Attacked Xiaofeng again in Episode 7 to gain revenge from his jail term	7-8
May Phua 潘淑钦	Zhuang Meifang 庄美芳	Shanhong's wife Rongkang's mother Due to stress, often beats up Shanhong; Got kidnapped and subsequently murdered in Episode 10 (Deceased - Episode 10)	5-6, 8-11
Cruz Tay 郑凯泽	Zhou Rongkang 周荣康	Meifang's and Shanhong's son This is Tay's debut drama.	9-12
Yeo Thiam Hock 杨添福	Chen Qingbiao 陈庆标	Biao-ge; Member of Xin Yi gang Molested few girls in Geylang before Caused trouble with Liu Zhenyang in Episode 17; Killed by Zhenyang in Episode 17 (Deceased - Episode 17)	9, 17; 19 (flashback)
Michelle Wong 黄怡灵	Hong-dou 红豆	Member of Xin Yi gang Zhang Minghui's love interest Indirectly killed by Minghui few years ago, under Hong Yan and Wang Dalong's order after mistakenly framed for betraying Xin Yi gang This is Wong's debut drama.	12, 16
Yan Bingliang 严丙量	Liu Bozhong 刘伯仲	Liu Zhenyang's father Quarreled with Zhenyang over his future and indirectly caused Zhenyang to be mentally unstable by putting him a lot of stress	19
Zhu Yu Ye 朱玉叶		Liu Zhenyang's mother Quarreled with Zhenyang over his future and indirectly caused Zhenyang to be mentally unstable by putting him a lot of stress	19
Shawn Tan 陈凯轩	He Qingtian 贺晴天	Qingqing; Guoping's and Guan Xin's son This is Tan's debut drama.	20

== Original soundtrack ==
Song title	Performer
看我的 (Watch Me Now)	Selina 任家萱
信爱成瘾 (Love Addiction)	Ella Chen 陈嘉桦
放不下的活著 (Holding On)	The Freshman 插班生

== See also ==
- List of MediaCorp Channel 8 Chinese drama series (2010s)
- List of The Queen episodes
