= Love Is All Around (TV series) =

- 爱在你左右
- Genre: Modern Drama
- Starring: Wee Kheng Ming; Apple Hong; William San; Eunice Ng
- Opening theme: 月光下 by Wee Kheng Ming
- Countries of origin: Malaysia; Singapore
- Original language: Chinese
- No. of episodes: 26

Production
- Running time: 60 minutes (approx.)

Original release
- Network: ntv7 (Malaysia); MediaCorp Channel 8 (Singapore)
- Release: 17 December 2007 – 7 February 2008

Related
- Fallen Angel; Where The Heart Is

Love Is All Around (Chinese: 爱在你左右) is a Chinese drama which was co-produced by Media Prima Berhad and MediaCorp TV. It was screened on every weekday night at 9:45 pm. It was telecasted on Malaysia's ntv7 channel and later, was telecasted on Singapore's free-to-air channel, MediaCorp Channel 8. This drama serial consists of 26 episodes. In Singapore, it made its debut on 18 August 2008 and ended on 22 September 2008, and was screened on every weekday night at 7:00 pm.

== Synopsis ==
Fu Xiaoyue (Apple Hong) is a tourist guide in a tourism company. She has been dating with Andrew Yap for almost a year. She always dreamed to marry with Andrew and hence she enter a competition and won a wedding package.

Zhuang Jiawei (Wee Kheng Ming) is in love with Yang Kaiqi (Brenda Chiah) for seven years. On that day, Jiawei's mom organise a birthday party for his girlfriend. Kaiqi celebrate her birthday and bought opera tickets for Jiawei's mom.

She entered a pageant beauty contest but later disqualified because she lied about her age. After that, Jiawei decided to go a vacation with her in Penang. Incidental, Xiaoyue is the tourist guide of the trip. His boyfriend is also there for work.

Xiaoyue is very happy and she want to have a romantic dinner with Andrew. But she is shocked to see Andrew and a girl in his room.

Kaiqi left Jiawei for her job and her boss, Mr Ma. Her boss gave her another chance but in return, she must become a "prostitute" for him and she eventually agreed, causing a deep heartbreak to Jiawei. Jiawei and Xiaoque meet each other when they are in the same tour group to Penang. After going through a scary hostage incident, they find strength for each other and fall in love. However, their love is not smooth sailing.

== Cast ==
=== The Zhuang Family ===
Cast	Role	Description
Wee Kheng Ming	Zhuang Jiawei	Fu Xiaoyue's husband
Eunice Ng	Zhuang Mei Mei	Eldest daughter Fu Xing Han's wife

=== The Fu Family ===
Cast	Role	Description
Apple Hong	Fu Xiaoyue	Zhuang Jiawei's wife
William San	Fu Xing Han	Zhuang Mei Mei's husband

=== Other cast ===
Cast	Role	Description
Andrew Yap		Fu Xiaoyue's ex-boyfriend
Brenda Chiah	Yang Kaiqi	Zhuang Jiawei's ex-girlfriend

== Airing dates ==
Country	Aired (First episode)	End (Final episode)
Malaysia	17 December 2007	7 February 2008
Singapore	16 August 2008	22 September 2008
