= Layla Sania =

Malaysian singer

- Born: Layla Sania binti Khairuzikri; 22 November 2002 (age 23); Kuala Lumpur, Malaysia
- Occupation: Singer
- Musical career
- Genres: Pop; jazz
- Instruments: Vocals; guitar; keys
- Years active: 2026–present
- Label: Warner Music Malaysia

Chinese name
- Chinese: 蕾拉·莎妮娅
- Hanyu Pinyin: Lěilā Shānīyà

Layla Sania Khairuzikri (born 22 November 2002) is a Malaysian Mandopop and pop singer of Malay descent. She became fluent in Mandarin Chinese as a consequence of attending a Chinese national-type primary school and a National-type Chinese secondary school from kindergarten to the secondary level.

== Career ==
In 2026, Layla Sania appeared in the Selangor special episode of the third season of Guangxi Radio and Television’s programme ‘‘New Folk Song Festival’’, where she performed a rearranged version combining the Cantonese classic “Man Shui Chin San Chung Si Ching” and the Malay children’s song “Ikan Kekek” with Chinese singer Karrie Ng."结合粤语经典与马来童谣《新民歌大会》雪州特辑上线3天播放破1.5亿". China Press (in Chinese (Malaysia)). 11 March 2026.
