= Deal or No Deal Malaysia (English-language game show) =

- Genre: Game show
- Based on: Deal or No Deal by John de Mol Jr.
- Presented by: Aanont Wathanasin
- Composer: GROOVEWORX
- Country of origin: Malaysia
- Original language: English

Production
- Running time: 1 hour per episode including commercials

Original release
- Network: ntv7
- Release: 3 November 2007 – 2009

Deal or No Deal Malaysia is the English version Deal or No Deal hosted on ntv7. The English-language version of the show premiered on November 3, 2007, hosted by Aanont "Non" Wathanasin. The gameplay is much the same as the Chinese version.

== Gameplay ==
For each episode, six contestants are asked general knowledge questions which they must answer correctly two times in order to proceed into the main game. The contestants can buzz in if they think they know the answer before the host finishes reading out the answers. However, a single incorrect answer will cause that contestant to be eliminated from the game.

The contestant who manages to answer two questions correctly proceeds into the main game. After the host asks what he/she would do with the money, the money board and then the Revlon girls (or beauties) are introduced. The contestant selects one case from 26 with the hope that it contains the highest value.

After that, the contestant is invited to pick cases to eliminate, now with the hope that it contains the smallest amount since cases eliminated are not in the contestant's case. Once the cases are eliminated, the host then receives a phone call from the mysterious "banker" who wants the contestant to leave with the least amount of money may gives comments and gives the offer to the host who then reveals it to the contestant.

At this point, the contestant is given the choice of selling the case and whatever amount contained in it to the banker and taking the banker's offer (by pushing the button inside the case) or rejecting the offer and open more cases (the number of cases opened decreases as the game progresses) (by closing the button cover), but not before being tempted with the catchphrase "Deal or No Deal".

Early in the game, the contestant is asked to introduce a few persons sitting aside invited by him/her. They can be of some help to the contestant, since they might give advice on what to do next and on which cases to eliminate.

The game is accompanied by the applause and chants of the audience which include the lowest value unopened and usually chant "No Deal!" (this changes when the audience perceives the risk as being too great) when the contestant is being offered the banker's amount.

When the contestant finally decides to accept the banker's offer or rejects the offer with only two cases left, the contestant is presented with a question where the host can provide only clues and that the persons sitting aside can give help but only for a short while before the host finally pressures the contestant for the answer. The audience isn't allowed to help the contestant in any way at this point. If the contestant answers the question correctly, the full amount is won. Otherwise only 20% of it can be taken home.

At this point, if the contestant accepted the banker's offer, he is given the scenario that if he/she didn't accept the banker's offer and opened another case, the contestant chooses a case, this time hoping for large amounts (since large amounts coming off the board cause the offer to drop) and what would the offer from the banker would be. When this finally goes down to two cases, the contestant is given the choice of opening one of the two cases (which contains the amount of money that will be taken home). The amounts in those two casings is eventually revealed and the game ends.

== Case values ==
RM0.10	RM1,000
RM0.50	RM2,000
RM1	RM3,000
RM5	RM4,000
RM10	RM5,000
RM20	RM7,500
RM30	RM10,000
RM40	RM15,000
RM50	RM20,000
RM100	RM30,000
RM250	RM50,000
RM500	RM75,000
RM750	RM100,000

All case values are the same to the Malaysia Chinese version of the show.

== Statistics ==
- RM 100,000 winner: (episode 33, aired 2 March 2008)
- RM 0.10 winner 1st (episode 32, season 1 aired on 23 February 2008)
- 2nd RM 0.10 win (episode 14, season 2 aired on 7 February 2009)
- Highest potential offer: RM 78,500 on 15 March 2008 (Accepted)
- Best percentage deal: Sold for RM 50,100 for RM 0.10 or 501,000% on 19 April 2008
- Lowest potential offer: RM 0.20 on 7 February 2009 for 2nd season

== See also ==
- Deal or No Deal (Malaysia, Chinese version)
