= Project Superstar (Malaysian TV series) =

- 绝对SuperStar
- Genre: Reality television Talent show
- Based on: Project SuperStar
- Country of origin: Malaysia
- Original language: Chinese
- No. of seasons: 3

Production
- Production location: Malaysia

Original release
- Network: 8TV
- Release: 2006 – 2008

Related
- Project SuperStar

Project SuperStar (Chinese: 绝对SuperStar) is the Malaysian version of Singapore's successful reality show of the same title. To date, three seasons have been completed on 8TV.

== Format ==
Preliminary auditions are held in various cities in Malaysia in search of Chinese-singing talents. There are three sub-stages in the auditions, the first two of which involve two rounds of closed-door tests, followed by the final round in which participants are exposed to the crowd (usually in a shopping centre) and judged in front of them, and only 24 of them — 12 male and 12 female, would qualify for the actual competition.

Upon reaching the voting rounds, the male and female finalists performed in two separate days, with the results announced in a third day for both genders. There are also three rounds of the voting rounds, the first of which is the preliminary round where contestants could choose any song available to them, while the next involved themed weeks, in each of which the each finalist must sing songs of the particular theme. In these rungs 30% of the results are determined by judges, and the rest by public votes. Third season has a huge change in the results, professional judges will have a greater say, which held 50%, and the public votes will take up the remaining 50%.

The third round is the Grand Finale, in which the remaining one male and one female finalists battle against each other for the coveted prize of being the Malaysian SuperStar with a recording contract. Unlike the previous round, the judges' role in providing 30% of the results is replaced by singles sales of the final two.

== Season 1 ==
Johnson Wee emerged victor of the inaugural Project Superstar, defeating Tan Desiree in the Grand Finale held in Stadium Melawati, Shah Alam on 29 April 2006.

== Season 2 ==
On May 5, 2007, Henley Hii was crowned as champion, triumphing over Orange Tan in Stadium Melawati.

== Season 3 ==
Season 3 premiered on February 9, 2008.

=== Top 24 ===
Contestant Name	Occupation	Age	Order Of Elimination
Kay 郭晓薇	Student	22	Female Champion Overall Champion
Hau 徐仕豪	Student	22	Male Champion Eliminated 3 May 2008
Eddie 赖勇霖	Student	19	Eliminated 20 April 2008
Nicole 赖淞凤	Student	19	Eliminated 20 April 2008
Adrian 陈凯旋	Student	20	Eliminated 13 April 2008
Ellen 徐佩霞	Clerk	20	Eliminated 13 April 2008
Will 郑幸安	Student	20	Eliminated 6 April 2008
Liz 伊利莎	Student	20	Eliminated 6 April 2008
Cliff 郑至围	Sales Person	27	Eliminated 30 March 2008
May May 詹依美	Student	25	Eliminated 30 March 2008
Kevin 邓凯文	Student	19	Eliminated 16 March 2008
San 黄惠珊	Student	23	Eliminated 16 March 2008
Jac 林伟明	Student	22	Eliminated 9 March 2008
Elson 戴祺锡	Health Consultant	25	Eliminated 9 March 2008
Pink 方玲妮	Unemployed	23	Eliminated 9 March 2008
Alice 林芯糸	Student	22	Eliminated 9 March 2008
Isaac 张富泷	Student	20	Eliminated 2 March 2008
Alvin 马铭泉	Student	20	Eliminated 2 March 2008
Fiona 邬汶凌	Sales Person	19	Eliminated 2 March 2008
Genie 黄净莹	Secretary	22	Eliminated 2 March 2008
Ken 万子健	Hairstylist	25	Eliminated 24 February 2008
Travis 张福峰	Chef	23	Eliminated 24 February 2008
Apple 邱淑菱	Student	21	Eliminated 24 February 2008
Shine 王幸儿	Student	20	Eliminated 24 February 2008

== See also ==
- Project SuperStar
