= My Kampong Days =

- 家在半山芭
- Starring: Ong Ai Leng; Wee Kheng Ming; Zen Chong
- Countries of origin: Malaysia; Singapore
- Original language: Mandarin
- No. of episodes: 30

Production
- Running time: approx. 45 minutes

Original release
- Network: ntv7 (Malaysia); MediaCorp Channel 8 (Singapore)
- Release: 12 August 2009 – 2009

Related
- Romantic Delicacies; My Destiny

My Kampong Days <<家在半山芭>> is the 14th co-production of MediaCorp TV and ntv7. It stars Ong Ai Leng, Wee Kheng Ming & Zen Chong as the casts of the series. It was produced in conjunction with Malaysia's 52nd Year of Independence.

== Synopsis ==
This drama is about how neighbours live in harmony together bearing with each other attitudes, and helping each other during times of trouble.

== Cast ==
Cast	Role	Description
Wee Kheng Ming		
Zen Chong	Qiao Jun Wei	
Ong Ai Leng	Cai Shu Lian	
Brenda Chia	Jin Xiao Qing	
Wang Yuqing	Uncle Zhi	
Lin Yiting	Aunty Zhi	
Ernest Chong	Tan Xue Wen	
Lai Meng		
Ivonne Saw		
Alan Yun		
Emily Lim		
Josh Lai	Qian Yong Guang	
