= The Thin Line (TV series) =

- 还我情真
- Directed by: Kok Tzyy Haw
- Starring: Zen Chong; Wee Kheng Ming; Tracy Lee; Duncan Lim; Stella Chung; William San
- Opening theme: 《青苔》
- Ending theme: "I Need Somebody" sung by Wee Kheng Ming
- Countries of origin: Malaysia; Singapore
- Original language: Mandarin
- No. of episodes: 25

Production
- Running time: approx. 45 minutes

Original release
- Network: ntv7 (Malaysia); MediaCorp Channel U (Singapore)
- Release: 3 September – 22 October 2008

Related
- Her Many Faces; Addicted To Love

The Thin Line is the ninth international co-production of MediaCorp TV and ntv7. This is also the first Malaysian TV series to be broadcast on MediaCorp Channel U when it debuted on 29 December 2010.

The actual filming took place in August 2008 and the series was aired on ntv7 in Malaysia the following month.

== Cast ==
=== Chen family ===
Cast	Role	Description
Wang Jun	Chen Youshun	Owner of Youshun Hang
Seck Fook Yee	Wu Xianglan	Tianbao's stepmother Tianyou and Tianhui's mother
William San	Chen Tianbao	Oldest son Xianglan's stepson
Zen Chong	Chen Tianyou	Second son
Jane Ng	Chen Tianhui	Youngest child and only daughter

=== Other cast ===
Cast	Role	Description
	Cai Ah Juan	Runs a stall at the market Yaoguo and Zhiling's mother
Wee Kheng Ming	Liang Yaoguo	Zhiling's older brother Tianbao and Tianyou's best friend Lin Meiqi's love interest
Stella Chung	Liang Zhiling	Yaoguo's sister Tianyou's girlfriend
Wang Yuqing	Lin Jiacheng	CEO of a company
Tracy Lee	Lin Meiqi	Lin Jiacheng's only child Liang Yaoguo's love interest
Duncan Lim	Huang Junjie	Tianhui's love interest
Felina Cheah	Yu Jia'en	A chef at the Chens' restaurant
Lin Yiting	Jiang Xiufang (Aunty Fang)	Yaoguo's adopted mother Liangs' and Chens' family friend

== Synopsis ==
Liang Yaoguo and his younger sister Zhiling had a hard life growing up with a loving but socially irresponsible mother and without a father. Yaoguo is responsible and diligent and cares for his family and friends. He and Zhiling are well-liked by everyone.

Chen Youshun runs Youshun Hang, wholesale food business, and has three children. His first wife left him when Tianbao was a boy and Tianbao dropped out of school early to help his father with the business. Youshun later remarried Xianglan, a trendy and arrogant younger woman who bore him a son and a daughter, Tianyou and Tianhui. While Tianbao dotes on his younger siblings and the threesome have a good relationship, he and Xianglan do not get along due to her favouritism towards Tianyou and Tianhui, leaving the exasperated Youshun sandwiched between them. Eventually Xianglan's elitist attitude drives a wedge between herself and Tianyou and her husband and makes enemies of their neighbours.

Tianbao, Tianyou and Tianhui have been best friends with Yaoguo and Zhiling since childhood. Tianyou and Zhiling are an item. Yaoguo meets Lin Meiqi, Tianhui's college classmate, and they fall in love. A handsome young man named Huang Junjie starts wooing Tianhui. Tianbao eventually finds the love of his life.

Just when everyone thought life could not get any better, fate throws them a curve ball. It turns out that Junjie wanted to take revenge on the older Mr Chen for a past incident. However, Junjie becomes torn when he realises he is in love with Tianhui. Yaoguo and Tianyou's friendship is tested when Tianyou starts courting Meiqi for some reason. Junjie, Yaoguo and Tianyou realise that there is a thin line between good and evil and a single decision could change their lives for better or worse.

== Awards and nominations ==
Golden Awards

- Nominated: Best Actor (Wee Kheng Ming)
- Nominated: Best Actor (Zen Chong)
- Nominated: Best Supporting Actress (Jane Ng)
- Nominated: Best Supporting Actress (Stella Chung)
- Nominated: Best Newcomer (Tracy Lee)
