= Romantic Delicacies =

- 美食厨师男
- Starring: Jesseca Liu; Melvin Sia; Monday Kang; Nick Shen; Ong Ai Leng; Tracy Lee
- Countries of origin: Malaysia; Singapore
- Original language: Mandarin
- No. of episodes: 25

Production
- Running time: approx. 45 minutes

Original release
- Network: ntv7 (Malaysia); MediaCorp Channel 8 (Singapore)
- Release: 2009

Related
- Welcome Home, My Love; My Kampong Days

Romantic Delicacies (Chinese: 美食厨师男) is a Chinese language drama, which was the 13th co-production of MediaCorp TV and ntv7. This drama serial consists of 25 episodes. It was telecasted on the free-to-air channel in Singapore, MediaCorp Channel 8. It was screened from 31 August 2009 to 2 October 2009, on every weekday night at 7:00 pm.

== Cast ==
Cast	Role	Description
Jesseca Liu	Shen Xiao Xin	Ye Jun's fiancée
Melvin Sia	Ye Jun	Eldest son, elder brother of Ye Lang
Monday Kang	Ye Lang	Younger brother of Ye Jun
Tracy Lee	Yue Hua	Mu Qian's worker
Ong Ai Leng	Mu Qian	Asam Laksa shop owner
Wang Jun	-	
Nick Shen	Mu Tong	
Chris Tong	Honey	Mu Tong's pen pal

== Accolades ==
Organisation	Year	Category	Nominee(s)	Result	Ref
Golden Awards	2010	Best Actor	Melvin Sia	Won	
