= Deal or No Deal Malaysia (Mandarin-language game show) =

Malaysian television game show

- Chinese: 一擲千金
- Genre: Game show
- Based on: Deal or No Deal by John de Mol Jr.
- Starring: Goh Wee Ping (Season 1); Owen Yap (Season 2)
- Country of origin: Malaysia

Production
- Running time: 1 hour per episode including commercials

Original release
- Network: ntv7
- Release: March 12 (Season 1) – September 4, 2007 (Season 1)

The Malaysian Chinese-language edition of Deal or No Deal (Chinese:一擲千金, pinyin: yī zhí qiān jīn, Jyutping: yat1 zaak6 cin1 gam1) is being aired on ntv7 at 7pm every Monday and Tuesday beginning 12 March 2007. Being the first Mandarin-language version of Deal or No Deal anywhere in the world, it was initially hosted by Goh Wee Ping, who was replaced by Owen Yap in season 2. Prizes range from 10 sen to RM 100,000, hidden 2 cases each held by a "Revlon girl" (i.e. the girls' appearance is sponsored by Revlon).

The second season premiered on May 8, 2008 for 52 episodes.

== Preliminary round ==
In each episode, six contestants join in the preliminary round in which the fastest one to answer two questions correctly progresses into the major "Deal or No Deal" stage.

If at any time the contestant answered a question wrongly, he / she will be out of the game.

== Second round ==
The contestant who won the preliminary round would select one out of 26 cases, hoping that the chosen case has the largest bounty. After that he/she needs to reveal six other cases before hearing the first offer.

The mysterious "Banker" communicates to Wee Ping through a phone, from which he reads out the Banker's offer to the contestant, tempting him/her with the catchphrase 賣或不賣 (pinyin:mài huò bú mài, lit. "to deal or not to deal"). As usual, if the contestant chooses not to deal he/she would have to reveal a number of unselected cases still held by the Revlon girls.

But when he/she makes the deal (by pushing a stylized red button enclosed in a glass case), or rejects the final offer with only one unselected case remaining he/she will answer an important question. If he/she answers correctly he/she gets the full amount of cash offered, otherwise he/she would only take 20% of it.

== Case values ==
RM0.10 RM0.50 RM1 RM5 RM10 RM20 RM30 RM40 RM50 RM100 RM250 RM500 RM750	RM1,000 RM2,000 RM3,000 RM4,000 RM5,000 RM7,500 RM10,000 RM15,000 RM20,000 RM30,000 RM50,000 RM75,000 RM100,000

== Models ==
- Case 1: Noemi
- Case 2: Miliamina
- Case 3: Jane
- Case 4: Vivian
- Case 5: Daniellikanika-Fiona
- Case 6: Nadia
- Case 7: Cassie
- Case 8: Mei Sze
- Case 9: Vivian
- Case 10: Yu Lian
- Case 11: Velva
- Case 12: Yaneki
- Case 13: Sharon
- Case 14: Nicole
- Case 15: Fiona
- Case 16: Vina
- Case 17: Daniella
- Case 18: Tracy
- Case 19: Jessica
- Case 20: Vivi
- Case 21: Ginny
- Case 22: Joey
- Case 23: Penny
- Case 24: Elaine
- Case 25: Cassandra
- Case 26: Reene

== Statistics ==
- Highest Amount Won (Deal): RM 50,000 (3 times)
  - Appearance: 12 March 2007
    Cases left: 2 - RM 100,000 and RM10
    Amount inside the contestant's case: RM10
  - Appearance: 7 May 2007
    Cases left: 2 - RM 100,000 and RM50
    Amount inside the contestant's case: RM50
  - Appearance: 1 May 2007
    Cases left: 2 - RM 100,000 and RM750
    Amount inside the contestant's case: RM750
- Highest Amount Won (No Deal): RM 50,000
  - Appearance: 31 July 2007
    Cases left: 2 - RM 100,000 and RM 50,000
    Amount inside the contestant's value: RM 50,000
- Lowest Amount Won (No Deal): RM 0.10
  - Appearance: 4 June 2007
    Cases left: 2 - RM 0.10 and RM 5
    Bank Offer: RM 3 (the lowest offer ever)
- Highest Potential Offer: RM 75,000 (Rejected) on 31 July 2007
- Highest Potential Offer: RM 82,500 on 2 October 2008 on 2nd Season

== See also ==
- Deal or No Deal (Malaysia, English version)
