= Zen Chong =

Malaysian actor (born 1978)

- Born: Chong Cheng Xiong; 15 August 1978 (age 48); Batu Pahat, Johor, Malaysia
- Other names: Zhang Zhengxiang; Zhang Zengxiang; Zhang Zhenxiang
- Occupations: Actor; property agent
- Years active: 2001–present
- Spouse: Geline See (m. 2011)
- Children: 2

Current stage name
- Simplified Chinese: 章证翔
- Traditional Chinese: 章證翔
- Hanyu Pinyin: Zhāng Zhèngxiáng

Birth name
- Simplified Chinese: 章增祥
- Traditional Chinese: 章增祥
- Hanyu Pinyin: Zhāng Zēngxiáng

Former stage name
- Simplified Chinese: 章缜翔
- Traditional Chinese: 章縝翔
- Hanyu Pinyin: Zhang Zhěnxiáng

Zen Chong (born Chong Cheng Xiong; 15 August 1978), formerly known as Zzen Chong, is a Malaysian actor and property agent who is based in Singapore.

== Early life ==
A native of the "New Villages" in Kuala Lumpur, Chong studied graphic design and worked at an advertising agency prior to joining Star Search Malaysia.

== Career ==
Chong joined MediaCorp in 2001 after finishing third in that year's Malaysian edition of Star Search Singapore. One of his first major roles was in the 2003 sitcom Lobang King where he was cast alongside veteran artistes Chew Chor Meng, Huang Wenyong and Irene Ang as the smooth-talking employee of Huang's character.

Chong is known for portraying juvenile "ah beng" characters, antiheroes and villains. He shot to fame for his role as the main antagonist in the hit period drama The Little Nyonya. Although initially a replacement for Andrew Seow, he was praised for his convincing portrayal of antagonist Robert Zhang and won a Best Supporting Actor nomination at the 2009 Star Awards, his first ever awards nomination. He was given his first lead role in the 2008 co-production The Thin Line.

== Personal life ==
He married his long-time girlfriend Geline See in January 2011. Chong and his wife have a daughter and a son.

In 2012, it was revealed during the release of The Quarters that Chong changed a character in his Chinese name after consulting with a fortune teller. His English name was changed as well, from Zzen Chong to Zen Chong. He has also converted to part-time acting and since become a full-time property agent.

== Filmography ==
=== Television series ===
Year	Title	Role	Notes	Ref.
2002	The Vagrant	Zhang Disheng		
2002	Kopi-O II	Hong Fuxing		
2003	Lobang King	Hong Daji		
2003	True Heroes	Wang Wei		
2003	Baby Boom	James		
2003	Beautiful Trio	Colin		
2003	Home in Toa Payoh	Dino		
2004	An Ode to Life	Zhang Ruixiang		
2005	Zero to Hero	Ping		
2005	Beyond the aXis of Truth II	Woody		
2005	Love Concierge	Ruan Yawan		
2006	The Shining Star	Ah Pao		
2006	Women of Times	Bruce		
2006	Love at 0°C	Victor		
2007	Switched!	Jiang Zhiheng		
2007	Fallen Angel	Chen Xuewen		
2008	Where the Heart Is	Hong Jiajun		
2008	Rhythm of Life	Wang Tianbao		
2008	The Thin Line	Chen Tianyou		
2008	The Little Nyonya	Robert Zhang		
2008	The Little Nyonya	Zhang Zuye		
2009	My Kampong Days	Qiao Junwei		
2010	Priceless Wonder	Li Caishun		
2010	Unriddle	Yu Zhenbang		
2010	Injustice	Lin Shunyuan		
2011	Be Happy	Ken See		
2011	Dark Sunset	Qiu Jiawei		
2012	Yours Fatefully	Hong Zhiguo		
2012	The Quarters	Luo Hanguo		
2012	Poetic Justice	Eugene		
2012	Game Plan	Li Ziguang		
2013	It's a Wonderful Life	Li Siyuan		
2013	Sudden	Zhang Hongxing		
2014	C.L.I.F. 3	Ding Youpeng		
2015	Crescendo	Zhang Shixin		
2016	House of Fortune	Henry		
2016	The Queen	Chen Zijian		
2016	Soul Reaper (勾魂使者)	Eddy		
2016-2017	118 II	Qiu Jianguo		
2018	118 Reunion (118 大团圆)	Qiu Jianguo		
2018	Eat Already? 4	Weijie		
2018	Say Cheese	Pan Zemin		
2018	Magic Chef (料理人生)	Kenneth		
2019	After the Stars (攻星计)	Qingfeng		
2020	Super Dad (男神不败）	Yang Sheng		
2021	CTRL	He Shaoguang		
2022	Dark Angel (黑天使)	Zhang Haohui		
2023	Fix My Life	Ye Tingfeng		
2023	All That Glitters	Roy		
2023	Stranger in the Dark (熟悉的陌生人)	Adam		

=== Variety shows ===
Year	Title	Notes	Ref.
2002	King of Variety		
2006	Battle of the Best		
2009	Stars for a Cause		
2010	Let's Party With Food! VII	Guest appearance	
2022	A Night Under the Stars	Guest appearance	
2023	The Reunion	Guest appearance	

== Awards and nominations ==
Year	Award	Category	Nominated work	Result	Ref
2009	Star Awards	Best Supporting Actor	The Little Nyonya (as Robert Zhang)	Nominated	
2011	Star Awards	Best Supporting Actor	Unriddle (as Yu Zhenbang)	Nominated	
