= Addicted to Love (TV series) =

2008 multi-national TV drama series

- 都市恋人的追逐
- Starring: Eunice Chin; Ong Ai Leng; Phyllis Quek
- Music by: 单A-Do
- Countries of origin: Malaysia; Singapore
- Original language: Mandarin
- No. of episodes: 30

Production
- Running time: approx. 45 minutes

Original release
- Release: 2008 (Malaysia)
- Release: 2009 (Singapore)

Related
- The Thin Line; Lion.Hearts

Addicted To Love is a Singaporean and Malaysian co-production Chinese drama which was telecast on Malaysia's free-to-air channel, ntv7. It made its debut on 22 October 2008 and ended its run on 10 December 2008. The drama consists of a total of 30 episodes. It was screened on every weekday night, 10:00 pm. This was the second Malaysian series to be screened on Channel U after The Thin Line.
