= Tracy Lee (actress) =

Malaysian actress

- Born: Kuala Lumpur, Malaysia
- Education: Tsun Jin High School; Yishun Junior College
- Alma mater: HELP University College; University of East London
- Occupations: Actress; host; businesswoman
- Years active: 2008–present
- Spouse: Ben Goi (m. 2017; died 2019)

Chinese name
- Traditional Chinese: 李美玲
- Simplified Chinese: 李美玲
- Hanyu Pinyin: Lǐ Měilíng
- Jyutping: Lei5 Mei5 Ling4

Tracy Lee Mei Leng is a Malaysian former actress and television host based in Singapore. Lee was a contestant in Star Search 2007. She became a Mediacorp full-time actress in 2008. In 2016, Lee left the entertainment industry, after deciding not to renew her contract with MediaCorp.

== Early life ==
Lee was educated at Tsun Jin High School and Yishun Junior College She studied accountancy at HELP University College and later graduated from the University of East London.

== Career ==
Lee was a contestant on Star Search 2007, reaching the semi-final of the talent search competition. Her appearance on the program earned Lee contract with MediaCorp in 2008 and began her acting career on the TV series The Thin Line. Following this the actress was cast in multiple roles including in the police procedural drama C.L.I.F., alongside her former Star Search 2007 co-star (and season winner) Andie Chen.

Lee was nominated for the Star Awards for Top 10 Most Popular Female Artistes between 2013 and 2015, and was one of the outdoor cooking segment hosts of The Sheng Shiong Show.

In 2016, Lee decided not to renew her contract with Mediacorp and left the entertainment industry.

== Ventures ==
Lee has a Chinese New Year cookie business and has served as a consultant for an online marketplace. Since July 2021, Lee has been running a maid agency, My Employment Agency, with a friend.

== Personal life ==
In 2017, Lee married Ben Goi, son of Singapore's 'Popiah King' Sam Goi who was the chairman of Tee Yih Jia Food. On 10 May 2018, Lee gave birth to their first child, a boy named Ben Junior.

On 3 February 2019, Ben Goi died from a stroke caused by a brain haemorrhage. He was cremated on 7 February 2019.

== Filmography ==
Year	Title	Role	Notes	Ref.
2008	Her Many Faces			
2008	The Thin Line	Lin Meiqi		
2009	Romantic Delicacies	Yue Hua		
2009	Friends Forever	Amy		
2010	The Best Things in Life	Jiayi		
2010	No Limits	Chen Fei		
2012	Double Bonus	Jin Peiling		
2012	The Enchanted	Bai Xuena		
2012	Poetic Justice	Sun Jiale		
2012	It Takes Two	Xu Jie		
2013	96°C Cafe	Tara		
2013	Love at Risk	Wu Qiyu		
2011	Prosperity	Lin Si'en		
2011	C.L.I.F.	Han Xiaoyang		
2011	Dark Sunset	Lin Peixin		
2014	The Caregivers (Missy先生)	Liang Xiaoyu		
2014	C.L.I.F. 3	Han Xiaoyang		
2015	Life Is Beautiful	Zhou Huimin		
2015	Second Chance (流氓律师)	Sun Kaili		
2015	The Dream Makers II	Diana		
2016	Peace & Prosperity	Huang Ziyu		
2016	If Only I Could	Liu Kaiqin		

== Awards and nominations ==
Year	Ceremony	Category	Result	Ref
2013	Star Awards	Top 10 Most Popular Female Artistes	Nominated	
2014	Star Awards	Top 10 Most Popular Female Artistes	Nominated	
2014	Star Awards	Most Popular Regional Artiste (Cambodia)	Nominated	
2015	Star Awards	Top 10 Most Popular Female Artistes	Nominated	
