= Apple Hong =

Singaporean actress (born 1978)

- Born: 31 October 1978 (age 47); Kuala Lumpur, Malaysia
- Occupations: Actress; host; businesswoman; singer
- Years active: 1999−present
- Spouse: Unknown (m. 2017)
- Musical career
- Genres: Mandopop
- Instrument: Vocals

Stage name
- Chinese: 洪乙心
- Hanyu Pinyin: Hóng Yǐxīn
- Jyutping: Hung4 Jyut3 Sam1
- Hokkien POJ: Âng It-sim

Birth name
- Chinese: 洪依萍
- Hanyu Pinyin: Hóng Yīpíng

Apple Hong (born 31 October 1978) is a Malaysian-born Singaporean actress, host, businesswoman and singer. She was a full-time Mediacorp artiste from 1999 to 2011 but continues to film on an ad-hoc basis.

== Early life ==
Hong was born in Kuala Lumpur, Malaysia. She received her education in Johor Bahru.

== Career ==
Hong was first runner-up in the Malaysian edition of Star Search 1999 and moved to Singapore after being offered a contract by TCS (now MediaCorp). She was then known as the 'Malaysian Shu Qi' due to her slight resemblance to the Hong Kong actress. Several years later she moved to SPH MediaWorks but was transferred back to MediaCorp when both companies merged in 2005. She made her cinema debut in Jack Neo's 2005 film One More Chance, starring as Mark Lee's on-screen wife. Besides acting, Hong was also a prominent face on magazine covers, print ads and television commercials in both Singapore and Malaysia.

Hong released her debut extended play in Singapore and Malaysia which consisted of 8-tracks with various musical genres including acoustic easy-listening, piano-pop tunes and also fusion of Chinese and Irish-styled songs.

Hong left the entertainment industry in October 2011 as she opted not to renew her full-time contract. While she continued filming with MediaCorp on a per-project basis, she stated she had wanted to spend time managing the Kuala Lumpur branch of Xiao Bar Wang (owned by former fellow MediaCorp actor Jeff Wang) and planned to further her showbiz career in China.

== Personal life ==
Hong married a Singaporean businessman on 10 October 2017. Having been a Singapore permanent resident for several years, Hong took up Singapore citizenship on 18 December 2022.

In August 2023, Hong revealed that her father died of Parkinson's disease, at the age of 76, on 11 August.

== Filmography ==
=== Television series ===
Year	Title	Role	Notes	Ref.
2001	In Pursuit of Peace	Ding Yueguang		
2001	Heroes in Black	Liu Feiyu		
2003	Eternity: A Chinese Ghost Story	Ping An		
2005	Portrait of Home	Gao Jimei		
2005	Portrait of Home II	Gao Jimei		
2006	C.I.D.	Long Liwen		
2007	The Greatest Love of All	Yang Qianru		
2008	Love Is All Around	Fu Xiaoyue		
2008	Just in Singapore	Qian Qian		
2008	Welcome Home, My Love	Vivien Tan Huey Yan		
2008	The Little Nyonya	Huang Meiyu		
2009	My School Daze	Tracy		
2009	Baby Bonus	Angel		
2010	Happy Family	Lemon He		
2010	Mrs P.I.	Phyllis Qiu Shuang Xi		
2011	Be Happy	Josephine		
2011	The In-Laws	Liang Xin		
2012	Joys of Life	Zhang Xiaoyu		
2014	Three Wishes	Anna		
2015	Mind Game	Linda		
2016	The Queen	Ni Qiaowen		
2019	Walk With Me	Vivian		
2019	Day Break			
2019	After The Stars	Lin Fei		
2022	It's All Your Fault!	Annie		
2022	Healing Heroes	Wen Hanyun		

=== Film ===
Year	Title	Role	Notes	Ref.
2005	One More Chance	Bee Poh		
2014	Die Xian Gui Tan			
2015	Love Will Be Back			

== Awards and nominations ==
Year	Ceremony	Category	Nominated work	Result	Ref
1999	Star Awards	Best Newcomer	P.I Blues (as Chen Anqi)	Nominated	
2010	2010 Golden Awards	Best Actress	Love is All Around	Nominated	
2025	Star Awards	Top 10 Most Popular Female Artistes	—N/a	Nominated	
