= William San =

- Born: William San Wai Lam; 1 October 1976 (age 48); Malaysia
- Occupation(s): Actor, Announcer, Presenter
- Years active: 1990s-present
- Height: 1.79 m (5 ft 10 in)

Chinese name
- Traditional Chinese: 辛偉廉
- Simplified Chinese: 辛伟廉
Transcriptions
Standard Mandarin
- Hanyu Pinyin: Xīn Wěilián
Yue: Cantonese
- Jyutping: San1 Wai5 Lim4
- Musical career
- Origin: Malaysia
- Labels: San Records; Warner Music Release Agent
- Website: William San Facebook Official Page; William San Sina Official Weibo; William San Official Blog

William San (Chinese: 辛伟廉; pinyin: Xīn Wěilián, born 01 October 1976) is a Malaysian actor, radio deejay and host.

San started out his acting and hosting before going into radio deejay. He has acted in several Singapore-Malaysia co-productions and was nominated for the Best Supporting Actor Award at the 2010 Golden Awards for his role in Lion.Hearts.
