= Teahouse in Chinatown =

- 牛车水人家
- Genre: Drama
- Starring: Zhu Houren; Liang Tian; Wang Xiuyun; Chen Tianwen; Li Nanxing; Fu Shuiyu; Chen Liping; Lin Meijiao; Liu Qiulian
- Country of origin: Singapore
- Original language: Mandarin
- No. of seasons: 1
- No. of episodes: 30

Production
- Producer: Michael Woo

Original release
- Network: SBC Channel 8
- Release: October 10 – November 18, 1988

Teahouse in Chinatown (Chinese: 牛车水人家) is a Singaporean Chinese-language drama series. The series stars Zhu Houren, Liang Tian, Wang Xiuyun, Chen Tianwen, Li Nanxing, Fu Shuiyu, Chen Liping, Lin Meijiao and Liu Qiulian. The series' theme song was sung by Eric Moo.

In 1989, a survey found that the series had attracted the third highest average viewership for an SBC serial in the last two years, behind Good Morning, Sir! and My Sweet Rival, having attracted 980,000 viewers on average.

== Cast ==
- Zhu Houren as Chen Debiao
- Liang Tian as Chen Donghan
- Wang Xiuyun as Lin Fang
- Chen Tianwen as Chen Defu
- Li Nanxing as Chen Dejian
- Fu Shuiyu
- Chen Liping as Zhang Ruoting
- Lin Meijiao as Li Lijun
- Liu Qiulian as Ma Fengjiao
- Chen Juanjuan as Chen Peiying
- Yang Junhe
- Jin Yinji as Deng Mialan
- Tiow Im Tan as Zhao Musheng
- Lin Yisheng as Ah Gui
- Steven Woon
- Chen Meng
- Chen Fengling
- Wu Weiqiang
- Zhang Shuifa
- Zeng Sipei
- Tracer Wong
- Tan Mui Kwang as Fuyu
- Fang Hui
- Lin Jinchi
- Hu Shufen
- Ang Puay Heng
- Ke Shafei
- Zeng Yaofeng
- Wang Songshen
- Liu Ruixiang
- Sean Say
- Liang Siming
- Huang Fa
- Richard Low as A-jun
- Dai Peng
- Lim Kwee-heok
- Zhou Quanxi
- Tang Hu
- Chen Zhonghua
- Wang Changli
- Zhou Shurong
- Zhang Jinhua
- Pan En
- Liang Baozhu
- Ye Shipin
- Yan Bingliang as Ding Qiang
- Chua Cheng Pou as Liu Mengyi

== Reception ==
The New Paper wrote that while the series was "above average", it "hits such high notes that it turns your emotions around and makes you want to laugh."
