= The Unbeatables =

- 双天至尊
- Genre: Gambling Drama
- Created by: Li Yanping (李艳萍)
- Starring: Li Nanxing; Zoe Tay; Chen Shucheng; Zhu Houren; Hong Huifang; Cassandra See
- Opening theme: 沉默的羔羊 by Chief Chao
- Country of origin: Singapore
- Original language: Mandarin

Production
- Executive producer: Lau Tin Fook (刘天富)
- Production location: Singapore

Original release
- Network: Singapore Broadcasting Corporation
- Release: 1993 – 2002

The Unbeatables (Chinese: 双天至尊) is a 1993 Chinese drama serial produced by Singapore's Mandarin channel, Channel 8.

The Unbeatables is best remembered for being the first Singaporean show on gambling, and featured early television appearances from Zoe Tay and Li Nanxing who went on to become two of the country's most prolific and popular actors in their respective genders. The show is set on the fictitious Coral Island (珊瑚岛), and is essentially about the intense rivalry and animosity between the families the two protagonists are in.

It spanned three seasons:

- The Unbeatables I - 1993
- The Unbeatables II - 1996
- The Unbeatables III - 2002
