= Star Awards 2021 =

Singaporean television award ceremony

Star Awards 2021 红星大奖2021
- Sponsored by: Bioskin (Presenter); Eu Yan Sang; Simmons; Holistic Way; Bio-Essence; Ebene; Mercedes-Benz (Luxury Car Sponsor); Daikin; Royal Caribbean Singapore
- Date: 18 April 2021
- Location: Jewel Changi Airport; Changi Terminal 4
- Country: Singapore
- Hosted by: Backstage: Dennis Chew; Jeremy Chan; Juin Teh; Hazelle Teo Walk-of-fame: Lee Teng; Vivian Lai; Desmond Ng Main show: Guo Liang; Quan Yi Fong

Highlights
- Most awards: A Quest to Heal (4)
- Most nominations: A Jungle Survivor (6)
- Best Drama Serial: A Quest to Heal
- Best Variety Show: King of Culinary
- Former Awards: All-time Favourite Artiste: Dasmond Koh

Television/radio coverage
- Network: Mediacorp Channel 8 Mediacorp Channel U meWatch; YouTube (Mediacorp Entertainment Channel)
- Runtime: 180 mins (Awards Ceremony); 90 mins (Walk-of-fame)

Star Awards 2021 (Chinese: 红星大奖2021) is a television award ceremony that was held in Singapore on 18 April 2021. The ceremony honoured the best Singaporean television released between January 2019 and December 2020. The ceremony was originally scheduled for April 2020, but due to the COVID-19 pandemic, Mediacorp announced that the ceremony would be postponed for a year until 2021.

Period drama A Quest to Heal won five awards including Best Drama Serial, Best Lead and Supporting Actors, Best Theme Song, and Best Director, the last of which was awarded in an unaired Backstage Achievement Award. Other winners include Zoe Tay of My Guardian Angels and Kym Ng of Daybreak, who won Best Lead and Supporting Actresses respectively, the former breaking a winning record of four wins. The drama with the most nominations, A Jungle Survivor, won only one award, with Zhang Ze Tong clinching the Best Newcomer. In the Variety category, Star Awards reclaimed a record-breaking eighth win for a Variety Special while Hear U Out became the biggest winner for a variety program with two.

In popularity awards, Dasmond Koh was named the year's All-Time Favourite Artiste. Dennis Chew and Zheng Geping won their tenth Top 10 Most Favourite Artiste, while Marcus Chin, Hong Ling and Bonnie Loo won their first Top 10.

The ceremony also drew several controversies, notably on the results for the Top 10 Most Popular Artistes after Felicia Chin fell short on winning her tenth award, as well as social distancing measures leading to Mediacorp clarifying about the measures taken.

== Programme details ==
Date	Shows	Time	Channels	Country	Remarks
18 April 2021	Live Commentary	3.30 pm to 10.30 pm	meWatch	(Singapore)	Live Telecast
18 April 2021	Walk-of-fame; Awards Ceremony	5.00 to 6.30pm 7:00pm to 10:00pm	Mediacorp Channel 8	(Singapore)	Live Telecast
18 April 2021	Walk-of-fame; Awards Ceremony	5.00 to 6.30pm 7:00pm to 10:00pm	Mediacorp Channel U	(Singapore)	Live Telecast
18 April 2021	Walk-of-fame; Awards Ceremony	5.00 to 6.30pm 7:00pm to 10:00pm	meWatch	(Singapore)	Live Telecast
18 April 2021	Walk-of-fame; Awards Ceremony	5.00 to 6.30pm 7:00pm to 10:00pm	YouTube	(Singapore)	Live Telecast
18 April 2021	Walk-of-fame; Awards Ceremony	5.00 to 6.30pm 7:00pm to 10:00pm	Astro Channel 338	(Malaysia)	Live Telecast
25 April 2021	Walk-of-fame; Awards Ceremony	2.00pm to 3.30pm 3.30pm to 6.30pm	Mediacorp Channel 8	(Singapore)	Repeat Telecast
31 January 2022	Awards Ceremony	5.00pm	8TV	(Malaysia)	Repeat Telecast (CNY Special)

== Nominees and winners ==
=== Awards ===
The nominees were announced on 4 February 2021. Winners are listed first, followed by boldface. (Note: The Best Director of 2020 goes to All Is Well and the Best Screenplay was awarded to Hello From the Other Side. The Best Director and Best Screenplay for 2021 were awarded for A Quest to Heal and All Around You, respectively.)

**Best Drama Serial**: **A Quest to Heal**; A Jungle Survivor; All Is Well-Singapore; C.L.I.F. 5; Day Break; Hello From the Other Side; My One In A Million	**Best Radio Programme**: **The Breakfast Quartet**; Little City, Big Matters; Morning Fanatics; Mr Zhou's Ghosts Stories; The Night Is Young Yeah!
**Best Short-Form Drama Series**: **From Beijing to Moscow**; A World of Difference; Best Friends Forever; Hello From The Other Side – It's Time; Interns' Survivors Guide; Tiles War; Walk With Me – Stories of Us	**Best Short-Form Variety Programme 最佳短篇综艺节目**: **Hear U Out**; Ah Boy To Dad; Friend or Foe?; Prank It; Pressing Issues; Thumbs Up! Senior – Takeover; What's for Lunch? – Lunch Talk
**Best Entertainment Programme**: **King of Culinary**; Ah Gong Can Cook; Beyond The Cameras; Hawker Academy; House Everything?; The Destined One; Yi Fong & Elanor's Kitchen	**Best Infotainment Programme**: **Fixer S3**; A Medical Journey; Be My Guest S2; Forbidding No More; Tuesday Report: A Hill and A River; Tuesday Report: Home Away From Home; Tuesday Report: One Metre Apart
**Best Entertainment Special**: **Star Awards 2019**; LNY Eve Special 2020; Sian Chay Bonding With Love Charity Show 2019; SPD CHarity Show 2019; Star Search 2019 – Grand Final	**Best Theme Song**: **Jones Shi and Ling Kai – A Quest to Heal 《乱》**; Nicky Lee – All Is Well-Singapore 《人间失格》; Misi Ke – Beijing To Moscow 《失去什么》; The Freshmen – Best Friends Forever 《好爱你lah》; Bonnie Loo – Heart To Heart 《幸福茶点》; Boon Hui Lu – Loving You 《同行》; Jarrell Huang and JJ Neo – My One In A Million 《就是你，就是你》
**Best Actor**: **Qi Yuwu – A Quest to Heal as Bi Zheng**; Chen Han Wei – Super Dad as Chen Kai; Elvin Ng – All Is Well Taiwan as Eric Loke; Pierre Png – A Jungle Survivor as Jiang Yongxi; Desmond Tan – All Is Well Singaporeas Wu Pinrui; Romeo Tan – Happy Prince as Wang Zile; Zhang Yao Dong – Day Break as Zheng Weilong	**Best Actress**: **Zoe Tay – My Guardian Angels as Mandy See**; Chen Liping – How Are You? as Dai Anna; Felicia Chin – A Jungle Survivor as Olivia; Rebecca Lim – A Jungle Survivor as Tang Ruo Qi; Kym Ng – My Guardian Angels as Wu Miao Miao; Rui En – Hello From The Other Side as Ma Ruyin; Carrie Wong – A Quest to Heal as Luo Mingyi
**Best Supporting Actor**: **Bryan Wong – A Quest to Heal as Sun Xi**; Brandon Wong – Hello From The Other Side as Lao Ma; Chen Shu Cheng – Old Is Gold as Zhou Renfa; Darren Lim – While You Were Away as Yu Guanming; Guo Liang – A Jungle Survivor as Titan; Ian Fang – All Is Well Singapore as Li Hao; James Seah – C.L.I.F. 5 as Lu Jiahao	**Best Supporting Actress**: **Kym Ng - Day Break as Zhang Tianqing**; Aileen Tan – Hello Miss Driver as Zheng Xueqin; Bonnie Loo - C.L.I.F. 5 as Lu Kexin; Chantalle Ng – Terror Within as Lin Xiaoyu; Cynthia Koh – After The Stars as Zhen Mei; Lin Mei Jiao - After The Stars as Zhang Lan; Lina Ng - Terror Within as Lin Xiuhong
**Best Newcomer**: **Zhang Zetong - A Jungle Survivor as Zhong Jianting**; Benjamin Tan – My Guardian Angels as Tang Guiqiang; Herman Keh – Interns' Survivor Guide as Focus; Juin Teh – Interns' Survivor Guide as Juliet; Ke Le – Ah Gong Can Cook; Seow Sin Nee - Hawker Academy; Sheryl Ang - All Around You as He Ruohua	**Young Talent Award**: **Goh Wee An – C.L.I.F. 5 as Xiao Huiwen**; Alfred Ong - Terror Within as Zeng Yang Yang; Audrey Gabrielle Soh - Super Dad as Chole; Ethan Ng Kai En – Happy Prince as Young Zile; Ivan Lo – How Are You? as Dai Zhengxiong; Natalie Mae Tan U-En – My Guardian Angels as Aelyn Xie Ning; Nicholas Lim Tao Rui - All Is Well Singapore as Xiao Ji
**Best Evergreen Artiste 常青演绎奖**: **Jin Yinji**; Chen Shu Cheng; Marcus Chin; Richard Low; Wang Yuqing; Xiang Yun; Zhu Hou Ren	**Best Programme Host**: **Quan Yi Fong – Hear U Out**; Cavin Soh – King of Culinary; Chen Han Wei – House Everything?; Guo Liang – The Destined One; Kym Ng – Ah Gong Can Cook; Quan Yi Fong – Yi Fong and Eleanor's Kitchen; Tung Soo Hua – Be My Guest S2

=== Drama series with multiple awards and nominations ===
The following Series received two or more awards and nominations:

Multiple Awards
Awards	Drama Series
4	A Quest To Heal 我的女侠罗明依

Multiple Nominations
Nominations	Drama Series
6	A Jungle Survivor 森林生存记
5	A Quest To Heal 我的女侠罗明依
5	All Is Well (Singapore) 你那边怎样，我这边OK
4	C.L.I.F. 5
4	My Guardian Angels 单翼天使
3	Day Break 天空渐渐亮
3	Hello From The Other Side 阴错阳差
3	Terror Within 内颤
2	My One In A Million 我的万里挑一
2	Super Dad 男神不败
2	Happy Prince 快乐王子
2	How Are You? 好世谋？
2	After The Stars 攻星计
2	Interns' Survivor Guide 实习生的生存记

=== Programmes with multiple awards and nominations ===
The following Programmes received two or more awards and nominations:

Multiple Awards
Awards	Programme
2	Hear U Out 权听你说

Multiple Nominations
Nominations	Programmes
3	Ah Gong Can Cook 阿公来做饭
2	King of Culinary 三把刀
2	House Everything 家简尘除
2	Yi Fong and Eleanor's Kitchen 怡凤和妹妹的厨房
2	Be My Guest S2 我。董。你。2
2	The Destined One 众里寻一 2
2	Hear U Out 权听你说

=== Sponsored awards ===
Bioskin Most Charismatic Artiste Award, alongside Best Theme Song and Best Radio Programme, are awards eligible via online voting. Voting began on 10 March and ended on 9 April at 11.59pm.

The Best Radio Programme was introduced in this year Star Awards to honor the best in local radio

The results are announced on the Walk-of-fame.

Bioskin Most Charismatic Artiste Award
- **Romeo Tan**
  - Desmond Tan
  - Ian Fang
  - Pierre Png
  - Qi Yuwu

==== Special awards ====
**All-Time Favourite Artiste**	**Dasmond Koh**	2000 | 2002 | 2003 | 2004 | 2007 | 2012 | 2013 | 2015 | 2018 | 2019

==== Top 10 Most Popular Artists ====
The top 10 nominations were announced on 9 March 2021 with several changes, with 60 artistes (30 of each gender) compete via a popular vote for the Top 10; for the first time in Star Awards history, there will be no televoting.

50% of the votes are determined by online voting, while the other 50% are based on the initial polling results of 1,000 people representing a wide demographic across Singapore's population, conducted independently by an accredited market research company.

With the combination of both years of ceremonies, 2020 and 2021, scores for both years for eligible artistes will be averaged by two; if the artiste is only eligible on either 2020 or 2021, only the scores that are tabulated on the eligible year is counted; artistes who are eligible in 2020 will only have their scores in 2020 tabulated; the reverse is true for artistes eligible only in 2021.

Voting began on 10 March, 12:00pm and ended on 18 April, 8:00pm, during the ceremony. Additionally, each user was limited to one vote per day, but the restriction was lifted to allow unlimited voting during the final three hours of voting.

Italic	New to list (not nominated the previous year)
**Bold**	Top 10 winners
n	Recipient's accumulated number of awards
**10**	Recipient won his/her tenth Top 10 award and would be awarded the "All-time Favourite Artiste" on the following year's ceremony.

Top 10 Most Popular Female Artistes
Artistes	Top 10
Ann Kok	9
Bonnie Loo	1
Carrie Wong	6
Hong Ling	1
Jesseca Liu	8
Jin Yinji	2
Paige Chua	6
Rebecca Lim	9
Ya Hui	5
Yvonne Lim	8^{1}

Top 10 Most Popular Male Artistes
Artistes	Top 10
Chen Shu Cheng	2
Dennis Chew	**10**
Desmond Tan	5
Guo Liang	6
Marcus Chin	1
Pierre Png	4
Pornsak	9^{1}
Romeo Tan	6
Shaun Chen	4
Zheng Ge Ping	**10**

== Ceremony information ==
The Star Awards 2021 centralized the theme of Connect (星起点), symbolizing the role media companies and other industry partners played in engaging television audiences during the previous year's COVID-19 pandemic in Singapore.

=== Event details ===
==== Event schedule ====
- Nominees Announcement: 4 February 2021
- Top 10 Nominees Announcement: 9 March 2021
- Walk-of-Fame, Awards Ceremony: 18 April 2021

=== Awards trivia ===
- This is the first time since 2014 whereas the award ceremony was held outside Mediacorp studios, this time at the Jewel Changi Airport and on Terminal 4. Not counting double awards shows (with the first show held at the studios and a second show at another location), this is the first time since 2006 to have this situation organically.
- Due to the expanded period of eligibility (see Impact of the COVID–19 pandemic below), this is the second ceremony to have more than the typical five nominations for most of the awards categories (except Best Radio Programme and Best Entertainment Special), with seven nominations.
  - This was previously used in the 2009 ceremony where each category have six nominations due to the revision of the eligibility period. Coincidentally, both ceremonies' preceding year do not have a ceremony.
  - This is also the third ceremony overall to have an increase of the usual number of nominations (20) for the Top 10 Most Popular Artiste award, with 30. The first two ceremonies with an increase were in 2011 (21) and 2017 (24).

=== Consecutive and records in award categories, first in Top 10 ===
- Zoe Tay surpassed Fann Wong's count for the number of nominations for the Best Actress, with 14. She also broke a record for the most number of wins with four, surpassing Huang Biren, Ivy Lee and Chen Liping with three.
- C.L.I.F. became the first drama series to have been nominated for five occasions for Best Drama Serial (the other being 2012, 2014, 2015 and 2017), more than any other drama serials to date.
- Out of the 31 artistes who did not receive a Top 10 nomination in 2019, 16 artistes were nominated for the first time, more than any number of artistes in a single year. This award also marks the first appearance of a number of artistes nominated in the Top 10 after long absences:
  - Edwin Goh and Yvonne Lim who both last nominated in 2014, seven years ago.
  - Ann Kok who last nominated in 2013, eight years ago.
  - Henry Thia who last nominated in 2009, 12 years ago.
  - Darren Lim who last nominated in 1999, 22 years ago.
    - Of these, Lim hold the record of having the longest gap between his two nominations for any of the Top 10 Most Popular Male Artistes, and is tied along with Lina Ng for the second longest gap for any artistes, behind Chen Xiuhuan's 24. Lim also now hold the record of having a longest gap of nominations without a win.
  - Marcus Chin, Hong Ling and Bonnie Loo won their first Top 10 after nine, three and four nominations, respectively.
- Star Awards won its eighth Entertainment Special award since 2017, surpassing the record of seven tying with NKF Charity Show.
- Quan Yi Fong won her fourth consecutive Best Programme Host, and her seventh hosting role including Info-ed Hosts prior to 2015.

=== Impact of the COVID-19 pandemic ===
The COVID-19 pandemic saw postponements in television production and Mediacorp had since suspended studio audience starting 7 February. The ceremony was first announced to be held on 26 April 2020, but in an announcement on 19 February 2020, the ceremony was delayed to the second half of the year, and that the original date falls on the period of "Circuit Breaker" (between 7 April and 1 June). On 7 August, Mediacorp announced that the ceremony will not be held in the 2020 year and delaying it to 18 April 2021, and the eligibility periods for the television series would be extended through 31 December 2020. Despite having options on conducting ceremonies virtually, Mediacorp chose to combine both the 2020 and 2021 ceremonies into a single ceremony as a 'bigger celebration', adding that the decision was to "continue to place the health and safety of our artistes, crew and guests as a top priority." This postponement resulted in 2020 being the second calendar year to not host a ceremony, after 2008 (which was postponed due to the revision of eligibility criteria).

On 6 April 2021, the show confirmed that the ceremony will take place at Changi Airport Terminal 4 and Jewel Changi Airport, and additional changes are made such as walking on a tarmac against the backdrop of a Singapore Airlines Airbus A350-900 replacing the traditional red carpet. Overseas guests are still featured but they are broadcast by teleconferencing from either Hong Kong or Taiwan due to the travel restrictions, which was also seen in several other award ceremonies globally. The ceremony would also be conducted closed-doors, a first in Star Awards history without a live audience. Additionally, during the ceremony, there are no handover of awards (similar to the 2007's Award (25th Drama Anniversary)), as the award is collected by the recipient itself. Furthermore, hosts and along with the ceremony procedures were separated across different parts of Terminal 4 to maintain social distancing. For example, the Backstage were hosted by Dennis Chew, Jeremy Chan, Juin Teh and Hazelle Teo in Changi Terminal 4, Heritage Zone, while the Walk of Fame was held at the main entrance of Terminal 4 and were co-hosted by Lee Teng, Vivian Lai, Desmond Ng. During the ceremony, Guo Liang and Quan Yifeng were stationed at the Rain Vortex inside Jewel, while Cavin Soh, Lee, Lai and Chew were stationed at different parts of Terminal 4.

=== Reception and controversy ===
During the ceremony, artistes were seen neither wearing a mask nor a face shield throughout the ceremony and took them off during broadcast, as seen on other televised live shows. However, social media and netizens began querying to Mediacorp on the safety of mask wearing, contradicting any social distancing measures, and whether or not it is safe to do so. Other netizens compared the ceremonies that held earlier this year, such as the TVB Anniversary Awards, which they do wore mask during the ceremony.

In a post-ceremony interview, celebrities such as Hong Ling, Bonnie Loo, Dennis Chew, Marcus Chin, and Chen Shucheng, revealed that the set has been adhered to social-distancing measures in which Mediacorp had been following with. Chen also revealed on an interview that he have wore a mask while making their way to the Walk of Fame, and removed it only when he arrived.

The Infocomm Media Development Authority (IMDA) replied that the ceremony did not violate any rules, including a gathering of up to 50 people in a taping venue during filming; at anytime, no more than 20 artistes are permitted not to wear masks; following the safe distancing requirements with a minimum one-meter. IMDA announced that they will not take any action.

Lianhe Zaobao, who also did separate commentaries during the ceremony, separately questioned Mediacorp on three claims, on the uneven airtime of certain celebrities, the handling of results, and the Top 10 Most Popular Artiste voting system, the last of which receiving headlines following frontrunner Felicia Chin failing to win her tenth Top 10 and thus preventing her to be conferred the All-Time Favourite Artiste next year, which Dennis Chew and Zheng Ge Ping were able to do so during the ceremony. The address was issued under the guidance of Mediacorp's Chief content officer Doreen Neo.

Mediacorp first addressed on the airtime that the artistes appearing during the Walk of Fame is limited to 90 minutes (including commercials) and thus airtime are given priority to Mediacorp artistes. Mediacorp also announced that the ceremony was planned several months ago, and the list of artistes have been arranged, ending that it has no relation with the claim and will not exclude specific artists or brokerage companies.

Mediacorp also emphasized that the Top 10 Most Popular Artiste voting system was announced prior on 4 February that 50% of the vote comes from the demographic of 1,000 people while the other 50% constitutes on online voting; these voting format was first introduced in the 2018 ceremony and was intact since. Mediacorp also announced that the "unlimited voting limit" (happening within the final three hours of the voting window) was implemented to encourage audience participation, as it was previously done in their web-streaming websites meWatch and its YouTube's channel Mediacorp Entertainment.

Finally, Mediacorp revealed that the increase of nominations from five to seven to accommodate the two-year format, was meant to affirm the qualifications for candidates and programs under the qualifying period (January 2019 to December 2020). All nominations went through a qualification criteria auditing under the PricewaterhouseCoopers (PwC) film, and a judging panel (consist of 70% of professional critics and 30% of Mediacorp personnel). All of the results are final by the judging panel itself and to ensure professionalism and transparency, and that the awards are given out in excellence on the efforts and contributions of works and its production. The opinions that put forward in the comments must be true and free with no prejudice.

Mediacorp concluded that they have dismissed the claims, ensuring that these refutes and its reports would not happen again.

== Presenters and performers ==
The following presenters were announced on 6 April 2021.

=== Presenters ===
Name	Role
Lee Rongde 李荣德	Announcer for Star Awards 2021
Jeanette Aw; Fann Wong	Presented Best Newcomer Award
Cavin Soh; Lee Teng	Presented Young Talent Award
Mark Lee; Gurmit Singh	Presented Best Short Form Drama
Mark Lee	Presented Best Short Form Variety
Lau Dan	Presented Evergreen Award
James Wen	Presented Best Supporting Actor
Chung Hsin-ling 钟欣凌	Presented Best Supporting Actress
Kevin Tsai	Presented Best Infotainment Programme and Best Variety Special
Matilda Tao	Presented Best Programme Host and Best Entertainment Programme
Joanna Dong	Presented Best Theme Song
Lawrence Cheng	Presented Best Radio Programme
Gordon Lam	Presented Best Actor
Sandra Ng	Presented Best Actress and Best Drama Series
Ella Chen	Presented Top 10 Most Popular Male Artistes and Female Artistes

=== Performers ===
Name	Role	Performed
Mediacorp Artistes: He Ying Ying; Desmond Tan; Nick Teo; Rebecca Lim; Pierre Png; Guo Liang; Juin Teh 郑六月; Tyler Ten 邓伟德; Kym Ng; James Seah 谢俊峰; Hong Ling; Herman Keh 郭坤耀; Teoh Ze Tong 张哲通; Zane Lim 林子颖; Gini Cheng 曾晓晴; Ye Jia Yun 叶佳昀; Daryl-Ann Jansen 莉玉; JJ Neo 梁嘉靖	Opening musical performer	You are the brightest star 《最亮的光》
Joanna Dong	Performer	Moonlight in the City 《城里的月光》
Lin De Cheng 林德成 (Footage voice over)	Short footage actor and introducer	Honoring All-Time Favorite Artistes Award
Zoe TayFeng Huishi 冯慧诗; Xu Bin; Kym Ng; Quan Yi Fong; Zong Zijie	Short footage actor and introducer	Honoring All-Time Favorite Artistes Award
Gigi Leung	Performer	Short Hair《短发》

== Related programme ==
Star Awards 2021
- Also known as: The Inner Circle
- 神秘嘉宾
- Genre: Talk show
- Presented by: Guo Liang
- Country of origin: Singapore
- Original language: Mandarin
- No. of episodes: 10

Production
- Running time: approx. 46 mins

Original release
- Network: MediaCorp Channel 8
- Release: 17 February – 28 April 2021

Related
- Star Awards

A 10-episode talkshow, The Inner Circle, was broadcast before the ceremony as a spin-off series. It premiered on 17 February 2021 from 8:00pm every Wednesdays. The series, hosted by Guo Liang, discusses the inside stories of ten All-Time Favourite Artiste recipients in Star Awards, leading up to the ceremony airing on 18 April. No episode was aired on 24 February due to the launch of Disney+ in Singapore and the launch event titled A Night of Disney+.

No.	Guest	Original release date
1	Li Nanxing	17 February 2021
2	Zoe Tay	3 March 2021
3	Fann Wong	10 March 2021
4	Qi Yuwu	17 March 2021
5	Joanne Peh	24 March 2021
6	Kym Ng	31 March 2021
7	Elvin Ng	7 April 2021
8	Dasmond Koh	14 April 2021
9	Mark Lee	21 April 2021
10	Christopher Lee	28 April 2021
