= Yan Bingliang (actor) =

Singaporean actor

- Born: Giam Ping Leong; Singapore
- Occupations: Actor; host; producer
- Years active: 1984–present

Chinese name
- Traditional Chinese: 嚴丙量
- Simplified Chinese: 严丙量
- Hanyu Pinyin: Yán Bǐngliàng

Yan Bingliang (born Giam Ping Leong) is a Singaporean actor best known for acting in many Chinese-language television series produced by Mediacorp Channel 8. A veteran actor, he entered the entertainment industry in 1984 after finishing Singapore Broadcasting Corporation's 5th drama training course.

Yan is known by his own generation for his role in Neighbours, the longest running drama in SBC / TCS / MediaCorp history, and for portraying antagonists or villains. He left Mediacorp in 2011 and is now working as a freelance artist, films director/producer, scriptwriter, acting course trainer and a real estate agent.

== Filmography ==
=== Television series ===
Year	Title	Role	Notes	Ref
1984	The Awakening			
1984	Youth 年轻人 之《三人行》、《金缕衣》	Kang Zi Ning's Uncle 康梓宁舅舅 / Tailor 裁剪师		
1984	Growing Up 吾家有子			
1984	Pursuit 怒海萍踪	Flower Shop Boss 花店老板		
1985	Man From The Past 大侠吴三奇	Servant 管家		
1985	Tycoon 豪门内外			
1985	The Unyielding Butterflies 铁蝴蝶	Wang Ma Zi 王蔴子		
1985	Son of Pulau Tekong	Gan Long 甘龙		
1985	Takeover 人在旅途	Chef Ah Cheng 大厨（阿成）		
1985	The Young Heroes 少年英雄	Duan Qi Rui 段其瑞		
1985	Kopi O 咖啡乌	Ah Bing 阿炳		
1986	Family Hour Drama 我爱旧家园			
1986	The Sword and Song 绝代双雄	Han Tong 韩通		
1986	The Bond 天崖同命鸟	He Ji Long 何吉隆		
1986	Under One Roof 家和万事兴	Ah Ji 阿吉		
1986	Samsui Women 红头巾	Brother Chang 昌哥		
1986	Men of Valour 盗日英雄传	Hu Sha Hu 胡沙虎		
1986 - 88	Neighbours 芝麻绿豆			
1987	Strange Encounters 奇缘 之《银河星》、《剑魂》	Qing Yang 擎羊 / Yu Yue Long 鱼跃龙		
1987	Pickpockets 提防小手			
1987	Moving On 变迁	Ah Bing 阿炳		
1987	Fury of the Dragon 冷月剑无情	Xiang Kun 项坤		
1987	Painted Faces 戏班	Bullion Driver/Drug Lord 金条司机/毒枭		
1988	Teahouse in Chinatown	Ding Qiang 丁强		
1988	Strange Encounters II 奇缘2 之 《错系红线》 《桃花女斗周公》 《广陵散》 《心锁》	Chancellor Qin 秦丞相 Chen Fei Hu 陈飞虎 King of Han / Xu Li 韩王/徐力 Old Eunuch 老太监		
1988	Mystery 迷离夜 之《梦》	Wang Long 王龙		
1988	The Last Applause 舞榭歌台	Huang Ke Qiang 黄克强		
1988	The Golden Quest 金麒麟	Deng Yong Sheng 邓永生		
1988	On the Fringe 边缘少年	Masher 色狼 （莫阿弟）		
1988	Airforce 空军	Mr Liu 刘先生		
1988	Star Maiden 飞越银河	Prof Lu 鲁教授		
1988	Heiress 世纪情	Guo Wei 郭威		
1989	Turn of the Tide 浮沉	Bao Tai Feng 包泰丰		
1989	Patrol 铁警雄风	Ma Biao 马彪		
1989	Fortune Hunter 钻石人生	Pan Zhao Tang 潘照堂		
1990	The Village Hero 大吉传奇	Liang Xin 梁新		
1990	Finishing Line 出人头地	Zhong Ji Ping 钟济平		
1990	Wishing Well 幻海奇遇 之《错体夫妻》	Mr. Chen (Manager) 陈经理 （陈天才）		
1990	Imperial Intrigue 大内双宝	He Bao Quan 何宝权		
1990	Happy Family 开心家族	Bi Tian Gao 毕天高		
1991	Against the Wind 启航	Song Yao Shan 宋耀山		
1991	From Heaven to Earth 七彩人间	Painting Immortal 画仙		
1991	The Last Swordsman 最后一个大侠	Teng Zhong Xin 滕中信		
1991	Black Phoenix 黑凤凰	Chen Da Sha 陈大沙		
1991	Legend of a Beauty 一代天骄	Huang Fu Yi Jian 皇甫一剑（剑痴）		
1992	A Time to Dance 火舞风云	Zhu Zi Jing 朱子敬		
1992	Crime and Passion 执法先锋 之《危情》	Hong Kun 洪坤		
1992	Duel in Shanghai 轰天龙虎	Yan Yong Tai 言永泰		
1992	Lady Steel 激情女大亨	Si Ma De 司马德		
1993	The Brave One 荡寇英雄	Revolutionary Leader 革命首领		
1993	Reaching for The Stars 银海惊涛	Zeng Qi 曾七（七叔）		
1993	Hidden Truth 法网情天	Taekwondo Master 馆主		
1993	Ride The Waves 卿本佳人	Bai Ya Shui 白亚水		
1993	The Young And The Restless 俏皮战士	Li Fei 黎飞		
1993	The Great Conspiracy 莲花争霸	Wan Ying Wang 万鹰王		
1993	Battle Of Justice 人海孤鸿	Rattlesnake 响尾蛇		
1993	Happy Foes 欢喜冤家	Manager Mr. Jiang 蒋经理		
1993	The Wilful Siblings 斗气姐妹	Wang Yong Ping 王永平		
1993	Ninjas In Town 伏魔奇兵	Ni Ke 尼克		
1993	The Unbeatables 双天至尊	Wu Fu 伍富		
1993	Heaven's Will 天机风云	Hong Tian Hu 洪天虎		
1994	Lethal Duo 天使追辑令	Bu Qiu Ren 卜球仁		
1994	Young Justice Bao 侠义包公	Si Tu Quan 司徒权		
1994	Scorned Angel 冷太阳	Liu Xian Hui 刘显辉		
1994	Thunder Plot 惊天大阴谋	Pu Dong 蒲东		
1994	Challenger 勇者无惧	Jin Zhen Xiong 金振雄		
1994	Fiery Of Lover 烈火情人	Prosecutor 主控官		
1994	Legendary White Snake 白蛇后传	Fa Hai 法海		
1994	Dr Justice 法医故事 之《红颜裁决》	Gao Yu Zhen's Father 高玉珍父亲		
1994	The Magnate 叱咤风云	Song Bing 宋炳		
1994	Love Dowry 爱情订金	Li Qian Wan 李千万	Telemovie	
1994	Love At Last 真心男儿	Hong Wu 洪武		
1995	Strange Encounters 3 奇缘3 之《深水情郎》	Ye Wan Lian's Father 叶晚莲父亲		
1995	Heavenly Ghost Catcher 天师钟馗 之《杨贵妃》&《六月雪》	Monk Tian Zhu 天竺僧人（师爷）		
1995	Love Knows No Bounds 甜甜屋	Hong Jie's Father 洪杰父亲	Telemovie	
1995	King Of Hades 阎罗传奇	Zhao Ping 赵平		
1995	Golden Pillow 金枕头	Zhou Bo 周波		
1996	Ah Xue 阿雪	Zhang Da Cheng 张大成		
1996	The Unbroken Cycle 解连环	Xian Feng Wen 仙凤文		
1997	The Royal Monk 真命小和尚	An Guo Gong 安国公		
1997	Longing 悲情年代	Fu Tou San Ye 斧头三爷		
1997	Playing to Win Uncle当自强	Xia Jian Cheng 夏见成		
1997	Rising Expectations 长河	Zheng Hua Bin 郑华彬		
1997	The Matchmaker's Match 四点金	Uncle Prawn 虾叔	Telemovie	
1998	The Return of the Condor Heroes 神雕侠侣	Wu San Tong 武三通		
1998	The New Adventures of Wisely 卫斯理传奇	Tao Qi Quan 陶启泉		
1998	Riding the Storm 陌生人	Zhang Han Xun 章翰勋		
1998	Legend of the Eight Immortals 东游记	Dragon King of the East Sea 东海龙王		
1998	Myths and Legends of Singapore 石叻坡传说 之 讲古奇冤	Hu Bing 胡丙		
1999	Wok of Life 福满人间	Hong Fu 洪福		
1999	Lost Soul 另类佳人	Lu Wen Hu 陆文虎		
1999	My Teacher, My Friend 小岛醒了	Jiang Zheng Zhi 江正直		
1999	Coup De Scorpion 天蝎行动	Ye Dong Hai 叶东海		
2000	On the Frontline 穿梭生死线	Lin Cai Fa 林财发		
2000	Four Walls and a Ceiling 我爱黄金屋	Shen Xing Wang 沈兴旺		
2000	My Home Affairs 家事	Hong Yun 洪运		
2000	The Legendary Swordsman 笑傲江湖	Chong Xu 冲虚		
2000	Dare to Strike 扫冰者	Zhou Quan 周泉		
2001	The Stratagem 世纪攻略	Luo Yao Fu 骆耀福		
2001	Heroes in Black 我来也	Chancellor 丞相		
2001	The Challenge 谁与争锋	Yuan Lao 袁老		
2001	The Hotel 大酒店	Yan Jin Liang 严金量	Cameo	
2002	Viva Le Famille 好儿好女	Wilson Woo		
2002	Bukit Ho Swee 河水山	He Biao 何彪		
2002	Fantasy 星梦成真	Song Zhi Qian's Father 宋子谦父亲		
2002	Springs of Life 春到人间	Cai Bai Liang 蔡百良		
2003	Romance De Amour 1加1等于3	Xu Fu Wang 许福望		
2003	A Toast of Love 吃吃面包谈谈情	Lin Jin Shui 林金水	Cameo	
2003	Home in Toa Payoh 家在大巴窑	Factory boss 陈经理		
2004	A Child's Hope 2 孩有明天 2	Huang Kuan 黄宽		
2005	Beautiful Illusions 镜中人	Uncle Qing 庆叔		
2005	A New Life 有福	Zhang Dongcai 张栋财/Zhang Wancai 张萬财/Curry Cai 咖喱财/Youfu's Father 有福爸		
2005	Destiny	Shen Cong Yi 沈从益		
2005	The Rainbow Connection 舞出彩虹	Uncle Gen 根叔		
2006	Through It All 海的儿子	Uncle Nan 南叔		
2006	Women of Times 至尊红颜	Mr. Wu 吴父		
2006	CID 刑警二人组	Lin Zai Fa 林再发		
2006	House of Joy 欢乐满屋	Liu Kun 刘坤		
2007	Let It Shine 萤火虫的梦	Wang Bing Shu 王炳树		
2007	Kinship 手足	Principal 校长		
2007	Happily Ever After 凡间新仙人	Ah Zhong 阿忠		
2007	Honour and Passion 宝家为国	Ou Yang Pei Pei's Father 欧阳佩佩父		
2007	Like Father, Like Daughter 宝贝父女兵	Uncle Gui 贵叔		
2007	Metamorphosis 破茧而出	Lu Jiu Sheng		
2007	Live Again 天堂鸟	Brother Wei 威哥		
2007	The Golden Path 黄金路	Uncle Biao 标叔		
2008	Taste of Love 缘之烩	Yu Tian Luo 余天罗		
2008	Just in Singapore 一房半厅一水缸	Ah Pao 阿炮		
2008	Nanny Daddy 奶爸百分百	He Gui Sheng 何贵生		
2008	The Little Nyonya 小娘惹	Huang Yuan 黄元		
2009	Daddy at Home 企鹅爸爸	Yang Shu Yong 杨树勇		
2010	Priceless Wonder 游戏人生	Chen You De 陈友德		
2010	New Beginnings 红白囍事	Li Jia Bao 李家宝		
2010	The Family Court 走进走出	Wang Shun Xing 王顺兴		
2010	The Score 无花果	Xu Xiong 徐雄		
2010	Breakout 破天网	Tang Ying's Uncle 汤颖大伯		
2016	The Queen 复仇女王	Li Zhenyang's Father 刘振阳父	Cameo	
2016	Peace & Prosperity 富贵平安	Hong Liangcai 洪良才		
2016	You Can Be an Angel 2 你也可以是天使2	Huang Mingshan 黄明山		
2017	Eat Already? 3 吃饱没? 3	Jin Nanshan 金南山		
2018	29th February 229明天見	Lao Luo 老羅		
2023	Fix My Life	Lulu's father		
