= Shujiao =

Shujiao is a female given name of Chinese origin. Notable people with the name include:

- Jin Shujiao, Chinese judoka and two-time medallist at the Asian Judo Championships
- Shujiao, a character from Singaporean television drama Double Bonus
