= On the Fringe =

On the Fringe may refer to:

- On the Fringe (film), a 2022 Spanish-Belgian thriller and social drama
- On the Fringe (1988 TV series), a Singaporean Chinese drama
- On the Fringe (2011 TV series), a remake of the 1988 series

== See also ==
- Fringe theory
