= Son of Pulau Tekong =

- 亚答籽
- Genre: Drama
- Starring: Huang Wenyong; Lin Ming Zhe; Chen Bifeng; Chen Xiuhuan; Huang Peiru; Liu Qiu Lian; Huang Caiyun; Zeng Yaofeng; Wang Xiuyun
- Country of origin: Singapore
- Original language: Mandarin
- No. of seasons: 1
- No. of episodes: 26

Original release
- Network: SBC Channel 8
- Release: June 13 – July 26, 1985

Son of Pulau Tekong (Chinese: 亚答籽) is a Singaporean Chinese-language drama series. The series stars Huang Wenyong, Lin Ming Zhe, Chen Bifeng, Chen Xiuhuan, Huang Peiru, Liu Qiu Lian, Huang Caiyun, Zeng Yaofeng and Wang Xiuyun.

== Plot ==
The show depict the lives of inhabitants of Pulau Tekong before they moved to mainland Singapore and their subsequent adaptions to new places.

== Cast ==
- Huang Wenyong as Wen Chao Qiang
- Lin Ming Zhe as Chen Su Chang
- Chen Bifeng as Zhen
- Chen Xiuhuan as He Wei Na
- Huang Peiru as Wang Hui Min
- Liu Qiu Lian
- Wang Xiuyun
- Huang Caiyun as Mei
- Zeng Yaofeng
- Cai Pingkai
- Zhang Jinhua
- Yun Changzhou
- Chen Guohua
- Li Huiyan
- Steven Woon
- Liang Lifen
- Chen Zhonghua
- Tang Hu
- Gu Rongfang
- Chen Meng
- Zhong Shurong
- Ke Guimin
- Wang Peiwen
- Huang Shinan
- Chen Tianxiang
- Yan Bingliang as Gan Long
- Guo Xianhua
- Bai Yan
- Tang Yencan

== Production ==
Leung Lap Yan, head of the Singapore Broadcasting Corporation's Chinese Drama Unit, described the show as a comedy.

== Reception ==
Wong Ah Yoke of the Singapore Monitor wrote that while the show "fails as a comedy", the "civics lessons are evident, although never blatantly so", and that they are "absorbed cleverly into the storyline."

Koh Siew Tin of The Straits Times wrote that the series "opens impressively but quickly lapses into mediocrity", and that "apart from the first three episodes, the serial is no different from the other contemporary dramas that SBC has made." He praised the performances of Lin, Cai, Zhang and Yun while criticising the performance of Huang Wenyong.
