= Star Awards 1994 =

Singaporean television awards

- Date: 26 February 1994
- Location: Singapore
- Hosted by: Chen Shucheng; Yvette Tsui

Television/radio coverage
- Network: Singapore Broadcasting Corporation Channel 8
- Produced by: Lin Peiqin; Wen Shusen
- Directed by: Li Yiwen

Star Awards 1994 is the first edition of the annual Star Awards presented by the Singapore Broadcasting Corporation to honour its artistes who work on Channel 8. A total of 16 awards were given out at the ceremony. Veteran actor Chen Shucheng and Taiwanese television host Yvette Tsui hosted the show. Former model Fann Wong interviewed invited guests to the show.

== Winners and nominees ==
Winners are listed first, highlighted in boldface, and indicated with a double dagger (‡).

**Top 5 Most Popular Male Artistes**: **Li Nanxing ‡**; **Chew Chor Meng ‡**; **Terence Cao ‡**; **Sean Say ‡**; **Desmond Shen ‡**	**Top 5 Most Popular Female Artiste**: **Zoe Tay ‡**; **Chen Liping ‡**; **Pan Lingling ‡**; **Aileen Tan ‡**; **Chen Xiuhuan ‡**
**Most Popular Male Artiste**: **Li Nanxing ‡**	**Most Popular Female Artiste**: **Zoe Tay ‡**
**Most Popular Male Newcomer**: **Yao Wenlong ‡**	**Most Popular Female Newcomer**: **Ivy Lee ‡**
**Most Popular Drama Serial**: **The Unbeatables I** ‡	**Most Popular Theme Song**: "侠骨豪情" **(Web of Deceit) ‡**

== Presenters and performers ==
The following individuals presented awards.

Presenters
Name(s)	Role
Carrie Ng	Presented the award for Most Popular Male Newcomer and Female Newcomer
George Yeo	Presented the award for Most Popular Male and Female Artiste
