= Finishing Line =

- 出人头地
- Starring: Edmund Chen; Li Nanxing; Aileen Tan; Zoe Tay
- Opening theme: 《生命过客》 composed by Lee Shih Shiong and Lee Wei Song, sung by Angus Tung (童安格)
- Ending theme: 《真爱是谁》sung by Angus Tung (童安格)
- Country of origin: Singapore
- Original language: Mandarin
- No. of episodes: 30

Production
- Running time: approx. 45 min

Original release
- Network: SBC 8
- Release: 20 March – 30 April 1990

Related
- Starting Over 暖流; By My Side 逆风天使

Finishing Line (出人头地) is a Singaporean Chinese drama series produced by Singapore Broadcasting Corporation (SBC) in 1990. It premiered on 20 March 1990 and ended on 30 April on the channel SBC 8. The story begins in 1983 and follows a group of friends as they grow up and forge their own paths in adulthood.

== Cast ==
- Edmund Chen as Zhong Chongguang 钟重光
- Li Nanxing as Xia Dejian 夏德建
- Aileen Tan as Xia Miaoran 夏妙然
- Zoe Tay as Ye Bei 叶蓓
- Zhuo Mingshun 卓铭顺 as Huang Haiwen 黄海文
- Bryan Chan as Feng Tai 冯泰
- Liang Weidong 梁维东 as Lin Gengsheng 林更生
- Hu Shuxian 胡菽贤 as Zhu Shaowen 朱少文
- Cai Du Cui 蔡笃翠 as Zhou Suna 周素娜
- Wu Weiqiang 邬伟强 as Ye Rongzong 叶荣宗
- Tan Mui Kwang 陈美光 as Hong Wanfang 洪婉芳
- Zhou Quanxi 周全喜 as Xia Zhuoshang 夏卓裳
- Zhang Xinxiang as Luo Hao 罗浩
- Yan Bingliang as Zhong Jiping 钟济平
- Chen Meng 陈濛 as Chen Ah Huan 陈阿欢
- Zeng Sipei 曾思佩 as Chen Ah Ai 陈阿爱
- Zhou Shiqiang 周世强 as Lin Xiangnan 林向南
