= Home in Toa Payoh =

- 家在大巴窑
- Genre: Family; Dramedy
- Directed by: Chia Mien Yang
- Starring: Li Nanxing; Huang Biren; Fiona Xie; Zhu Mimi; Cavin Soh; Huang Yiliang
- Opening theme: 自己的天空 by Alan Poh, sung by Cavin Soh
- Ending theme: 家在大巴窑 by Marcus Chin
- Country of origin: Singapore
- Original languages: Mandarin with Teochew and Singlish dialogue
- No. of episodes: 30

Production
- Running time: approx. 45 minutes

Original release
- Network: MediaCorp
- Release: 15 December 2003 – 23 January 2004

Related
- Always on My Mind; The Crime Hunters

Home in Toa Payoh is a Singaporean Chinese drama which had its original run telecast in December 2003. The drama is produced by Singapore's MediaCorp TV Channel 8. It was re-aired in 2007 on every weekday, 5.30pm on Channel 8.

== Synopsis ==
The first four minutes of the first episode introduces Toa Payoh, one of Singapore's oldest estates, and chronicles its development from a small "kampung" along swampy marshland to a modernised thriving neighbourhood. The series depicts life in a typical HDB estate.

Baomei, Pengkun and Guocheng are childhood friends who grew up together in Toa Payoh. Baomei is an overly thrifty bachelor who is a foreman at a factory. Pengkun is a top technician at Baomei's factory but is always skiving to return home early to be with his wife and children. Guocheng is a highly successful insurance salesman with a loving but constantly nagging wife Huiming. The three of them and their families have to put up with the gossipy and quarrelsome Auntie Fen who often argues with Guocheng's father-in-law.

== Cast ==
=== Main cast ===
- Li Nanxing as Li Baomei "Ah Bee" (李保美)
- Cavin Soh as Zhou Pengkun (周朋琨)
- Huang Yiliang as Yuan Guocheng (袁国程)
- Huang Biren as Zheng Huiming (郑惠明) "Kaypoh Queen"
- Fiona Xie as Yuan Shuhuai (袁淑怀)
- Mimi Chu as Wu Lifen "Elephant" (吴立纷)

=== Supporting cast ===
- Li Wenhai as Zheng Daba (郑大跋)
- Yang Libing as Wu Jinxiu (吴锦绣), Lifen's niece
- Zen Chong as Dino
- Liang Tian as "Ninth Uncle" (九叔)
- Rayson Tan
- Yan Bingliang as factory boss
- Margaret Lee as Qunying
