= A Quest to Heal =

Singaporean TV series

- 我的女侠罗明依
- Genre: Period; Time slip Drama
- Directed by: Doreen Yap; Christina Koh; Ken Ng; Poh Ya Xin; Lee Jia Wei
- Starring: Carrie Wong; Qi Yuwu; Xu Bin; Ya Hui; Bryan Wong; Jeffrey Xu
- Opening theme: 乱 by 石康钧 & Ling Kai
- Country of origin: Singapore
- Original language: Mandarin Chinese
- No. of episodes: 32

Production
- Executive producer: Leong Lye Lin
- Production locations: Singapore; Hengdian World Studios in China
- Running time: 45 minutes (excluding ads)

Original release
- Network: Mediacorp Channel 8
- Release: 20 July – 14 August 2020

A Quest to Heal (Chinese: 我的女侠罗明依) is a 2020 Singaporean Chinese-language drama series. It tells the story of a heroine (Carrie Wong) and an imperial guard (Qi Yuwu) who accidentally travels from the Ming Dynasty to modern Singapore, and together they face the evil palace forces, who plan to rule both worlds.

Consisting of 32 episodes, it premiered on 20 July 2020, airing on weekdays at 9pm on Channel 8. It also aired on Astro AEC in Malaysia, and is available on meWATCH.

== Broadcast ==
Channel	Country	Air date	Schedule
Astro AEC	Malaysia	20 July 2020 - 1 September 2020	Mon-Fri 8.30pm-9.30pm
Channel 8	Singapore	20 July 2020 - 1 September 2020	Mon-Fri 9.00pm-10.00pm
meWATCH	Singapore	Official streaming platform	
8TV	Malaysia	9 February 2022 - 28 April 2022	Wed-Thu 10.00pm-11.00pm (till 31 March) Wed-Thu 10.00pm-12.00am (from 6 April)
GMM 25	Thailand	29 May 2022 -	Sat-Sun 9.30pm-10.30pm
VTV8	Vietnam	25 Mar 2026 -	Everyday 12.45pm-13.15pm

== Plot ==
During the 1500s Ming Dynasty, a heroine named Luo Ming Yi (Carrie Wong) sneaks into the heavily guarded imperial jail to rescue her senior, the famous doctor Li Shizhen (Xu Bin). She is stopped by the agent Bi Zheng (Qi Yu Wu), a Brocaded Robe Guard under the command of the powerful Eunuch Sun (Bryan Wong). The two engage in a fierce fight and unknowingly travel through time to Singapore in 2020. They encounter the descendants of Li Shizhen, who now owns a failing traditional herbal restaurant.

Luo Ming Yi and Bi Zheng have no choice but to cooperate and help the restaurant. But their time-travelling feat is noticed by the evil Eunuch Sun, who has plans to take over both worlds. Can the two martial artists stop the evil plan before it is too late?

== Cast ==
- Carrie Wong as Luo Ming Yi 罗明依
- Qi Yuwu as Bi Zheng 毕正
- Xu Bin as Li Shizhen / Li Jishi 李济世
- Ya Hui as Ya San 哑三 / Yan Ting Ting 严婷婷
- Bryan Wong as Eunuch Sun 孙公公
- Jeffrey Xu as Duke Gong 龚王爷
- Cynthia Koh as Li Shaotong
- Yao Wenlong as Zeng Xiao Sa 曾潇洒
- Cavin Soh as Hao Si Wen 郝斯文
- Kayly Loh as Belinda
- Tyler Ten as Derrick
- Joyce Ng as Xiao Li 小丽

== Production ==
It is the first time MediaCorp has produced a period drama after a hiatus of 15 years. The full period drama episodes occupies a total of seven episodes, including rare martial arts scenes in local dramas. The period scene was filmed in Hengdian World Studios, one of the largest film studios in China. The traditional costumes were designed by Chinese designer Chen Minzheng, whose previous works include Empresses in the Palace, The Stand-In.

The drama series was initially planned to be released on 8 May 2020, but was moved to 20 July 2020 due to the COVID-19 pandemic and the Singaporean general election.

== Accolades ==
Organisation	Year	Category	Nominees	Result	Ref
Asian Academy Creative Awards	2020	Best Theme Song	"乱" by 石康钧 and Ling Kai	Won	
International Emmy Awards	2021	Best Telenovela	—N/a	Nominated	
Star Awards	2021	Best Drama Serial	—N/a	Won	
Star Awards	2021	Best Actor	Qi Yuwu	Won	
Star Awards	2021	Best Actress	Carrie Wong	Nominated	
Star Awards	2021	Best Supporting Actor	Bryan Wong	Won	
Star Awards	2021	Best Theme Song	"乱" by 石康钧 and Ling Kai	Won	
