= A Promise for Tomorrow =

- 拥抱明天
- Genre: Family
- Opening theme: 知足 sung by Mayday 五月天
- Ending theme: 为明天 sung by Michael Wong 光良
- Country of origin: Singapore
- Original language: Chinese
- No. of episodes: 20

Production
- Running time: approx. 45 minutes per episode

Original release
- Network: MediaCorp Channel 8
- Release: 10 October – 4 November 2005

A Promise For Tomorrow (Chinese: 拥抱明天) is a Singaporean Chinese drama series which aired on Mediacorp TV Channel 8 in 2005. Former actress Chen Xiuhuan, who had effectively retired from showbiz during the 1990s, made a temporary return to acting for the drama.

== Synopsis ==
21-year-old Fang Fang comes from an unfortunate background. Her father Fang Zhen married young and his philandering ways caused his wife Huiyin to leave him. To worsen matters, Fang Fang has to take care of two younger siblings from two different mothers from her father's extramarital affairs and also run the small family business at the same time. Another of Fang Zhen's out-of-wedlock children Fang Xiang is sent to live with them. Adding to Fang Fang's woes, Fang Xiang is epileptic and has cancer.

== Cast ==
- Rui En as Fang Fang
- Chen Xiuhuan as Huang Huiyin
- Huang Wenyong as Fang Zhen
- Qi Yuwu as "GG Bond"
- Nick Shen
- Ix Shen
- Constance Song
- Eelyn Kok
- Mark Lee
- Chen Tianwen
- Lin Meijiao

== Production ==
The drama is presented by National Kidney Foundation Singapore.

== Reception ==
Wendy Teo of The New Paper rated it as 4 stars out of 5.

== Accolades ==
Year	Award	Category	Recipients (if any)	Result
2006	Star Awards	Young Talent Award	Jarren Ho 何俊扬	Nominated
2006	Star Awards	Young Talent Award	Zoei Ong 王楚仪	Nominated
