= Michelle Chia =

Singaporean host and actress

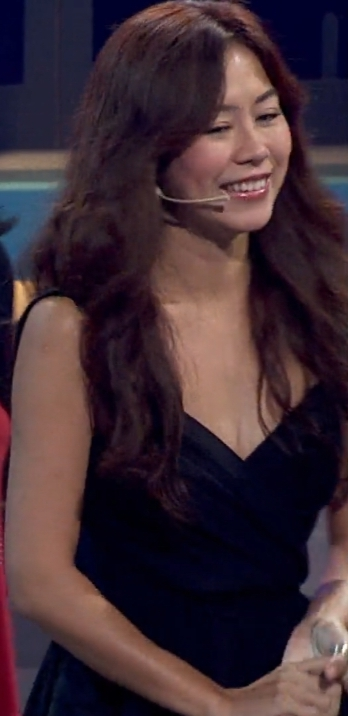
- Born: Singapore
- Other name: Xie Yunyi
- Education: Raffles Girls' Primary School; Bowen Secondary School
- Occupations: Host; actress; businesswoman; model
- Years active: 1980–present
- Spouses: Shaun Chen (m. 2009; div. 2011) Jackson Chen (m. 2025)

Chinese name
- Traditional Chinese: 謝韻儀
- Simplified Chinese: 谢韵仪
- Hanyu Pinyin: Xiè Yùnyí
- Jyutping: Ze6 Wan6 Ji4
- Hokkien POJ: Chiā Ūn-gî

Michelle Chia Yun Yi is a Singaporean television host, actress and businesswoman. She was a full-time Mediacorp artiste from 1980 to 2012 but continues to film on an ad-hoc basis.

== Early life and career ==
Chia was educated at Raffles Girls' Primary School and Bowen Secondary School.

Chia started her career as a child actress with SBC. She later joined TCS (predecessor of MediaCorp) after finishing her school. In 2000 she switched to SPH MediaWorks but was transferred back to MediaCorp when it absorbed MediaWorks. In May 2012, Chia left the entertainment industry due to the expiry of her contract with MediaCorp. She had declined to renew it, stating that she wanted to temporarily "take a break" from showbiz.

== Ventures ==
In a 2018 interview with 8 Days, Chia revealed that she made investments into businesses while she was acting full-time, and was a partner of Monsoon Hair Salon and owned an investment firm.

== Personal life ==
In May 2009, Chia and Shaun Chen was married, after dating for six years. On 28 April 2011, it was revealed that the couple was filing for divorce due to "personality differences". The divorce proceedings were finalised in October 2011.

== Filmography ==
=== Television series ===
Year	Title	Role	Notes	Ref.
1986	Samsui Women	Ah Gui (child)	Episode 1	
1996	Spirits on Wheel	Yongqi		
1998	Facing the Music	Xia Ning		
2001	Legendary Fighter: Yang's Heroine	Imperial Consort Wang		
2004	Two of a Kind (双响炮)			
2004	Power of Love (甜蜜风暴)			
2004	Zero	Guardian of level 1		
2005	Yummy Yummy	Yuko		
2005	Destiny	Cen Fei		
2005	Lifeline			
2008	Taste of Love	Yu Lingzhi		
2008	Perfect Cut	Kelly Lim		
2009	The A-Go-Go Princess (穿越阿哥哥)	Liu Xiangmei		
2009	Perfect Cut II	Kelly Lim		
2009	Polo Boys	Diane Lee		
2011	Let's Play Love	Coco		
2012	Double Bonus	Isabella		
2012	Pillow Talk	Liang Chuning		
2016	The Queen	Hong Yan		
2018	Gifted	Yao Liqian		

== Awards and nominations ==
Year	Ceremony	Award category	Nominated work	Result	Ref
1995	Star Awards	Best Newcomer	Strange Encounters 3	Nominated	
1999	Star Awards	Top 10 Most Popular Female Artistes	—N/a	Won	
2005	Star Awards	Top 10 Most Popular Female Artistes	—N/a	Won	
2006	Star Awards	Top 10 Most Popular Female Artistes	—N/a	Won	
2007	Star Awards	Top 10 Most Popular Female Artistes	—N/a	Won	
2009	Star Awards	Top 10 Most Popular Female Artistes	—N/a	Nominated	
2010	Star Awards	Best Info-Ed Programme Show Host	Stars for a Cause	Nominated	
2010	Star Awards	Top 10 Most Popular Female Artistes	—N/a	Won	
2011	Star Awards	Top 10 Most Popular Female Artistes	—N/a	Won	
2012	Star Awards	Top 10 Most Popular Female Artistes	—N/a	Nominated	
2022	Star Awards	Top 10 Most Popular Female Artistes	—N/a	Nominated	
