= Destiny (Singaporean TV series) =

2005 Singaporean television series

- Title card
- Traditional Chinese: 夢在手裡
- Simplified Chinese: 梦在手里
- Literal meaning: "Dreams in Hands"
- Hanyu Pinyin: Mèng zài shǒu lǐ
- Genre: Romance; Drama
- Screenplay by: Chen Haixing
- Story by: Soh Eng
- Directed by: Huang Guangrong
- Starring: Joanne Peh; Ix Shen; Tay Ping Hui; Huang Wenyong; Michelle Chia; Hawick Lau
- Opening theme: "Destiny" by Joi Chua
- Ending theme: "We Don't Cry" by Wakin Chau; "Unknown Future" by Joi Chua
- Country of origin: Singapore
- Original language: Mandarin
- No. of seasons: 1
- No. of episodes: 25

Production
- Executive producer: Winnie Wong
- Cinematography: Zheng Ruibao; Lin Zaihe; Lin Hecun
- Editor: Zhang Bifang
- Running time: 45 minutes
- Production company: MediaCorp

Original release
- Network: MediaCorp Channel 8
- Release: 11 July 2005 – August 2005

Destiny (Chinese: 梦在手里) is a 2005 Singaporean romantic drama series starring Joanne Peh, Ix Shen, Tay Ping Hui, Huang Wenyong, Michelle Chia and Hawick Lau.

== Cast ==
=== Main and supporting ===
- Joanne Peh as Yao Siqi
- Ix Shen as Fan Yining
- Tay Ping Hui as Shen Jingwen
- Huang Wenyong as Shen Congye
- Michelle Chia as Cen Fei
- Hawick Lau as Fan Yijie
- Ezann Lee as Shen Meibao
- Yan Bingliang as Shen Congyi
- Li Yinzhu as Fan-ma
- Liang Tian as Fan-ba
- Dai Qianyun as Tao Jingjing
- Lynn Poh as Ye Ling
- Jaime Teo as Sara
- Wallace Ang as Alan
- Ye Shipin as Zhao Shiquan
- Liu Lingling as You-jie
- Amy Cheng as Shen Qianwen
- Xie Zhixuan as Cen Fei's mother

=== Special appearances ===
- Li Wenhai as Siqi's father
- Chen Xiuhuan as Siqi's mother
- Mak Ho-wai as Cen Fei's father

== Awards and nominations ==
Year	Awards	Category	Nominees	Result	Ref.
2005	Star Awards	Best Theme Song	"Destiny"	Nominated	
2005	Star Awards	Best Actor	Huang Wenyong	Nominated	
