= King of Culinary =

Singaporean television game show

- 三把刀; Raja Kulinari ராஜா கைய வச்சா
- Presented by: Lee Teng (season 1); Cavin Soh (season 2-present; Chinese); Farhana M Noor (season 3; Malay); Udaya Soundari (season 3; Tamil); Hossan Leong (season 3; finale); Kym Ng (Woks Up spin-off; Chinese)
- Starring: Eric Neo; Eric Teo; Pung Lu Tin; Shahrizal Salleh; Iskander Latiff; Khaled Shrafodden; Anand Kumar; S.R. Bala; Thanabalan
- Country of origin: Singapore
- Original language: Chinese
- No. of seasons: 12 (Note: Breakdown of total seasons (as of 2 November 2026): Chinese version: 6 (including 1 spinoff season); Malay version: 3; Tamil version: 3)
- No. of episodes: 110 (Note: Breakdown of total episodes (as of 2 November 2026): Chinese version: 56 episodes; Malay version: 30 episodes; Tamil version: 30 episodes; The Final Showdown: 4 episodes; Woks' Up: TBA)

Production
- Production location: Mediacorp TV Studio
- Running time: 60 minutes (including commercials)
- Production company: Mediacorp

Original release
- Network: Mediacorp Channel 8 MeWATCH; Channel 5 (season 3 finale); Suria (season 3-present); Vasantham (season 3-present)
- Release: 3 July 2019 – present

King of Culinary (Chinese: 三把刀; pinyin: Sānbǎdāo; lit. 'Three Knives', Malay: Raja Kulinari; Tamil: ராஜா கைய வச்சா; Raja Kaiya Vecha) is a Singaporean culinary game show broadcast on Mediacorp Channel 5, Channel 8, Suria, Vasantham and simulcast on MeWATCH and YouTube. Each episode feature home cooks pitting against veteran top chefs for a cash prize and a set of kitchen knives.

The series premiered on 3 July 2019 on Channel 8, which garnered positive reviews and acclaim, leading to the show being renewed for a second season, premiering on 18 November 2020. After the show won the Star Awards 2021 and popular demand, the third season expanded reach to the Malay and Tamil audience, culminating to the one-off four-episode special titled The Final Showdown at the end of the season, and as such King of Culinary is one of a few televised shows to be multilingual. To date, the series produced 10 seasons across the three versions in total, and one celebrity spin-off.

The latest completed season, the fifth Chinese season (subtitled "the comeback"), premiered on 25 March 2026 and ended on 27 May 2026. The third Tamil season premiered on 29 August 2026 before the premiere of the third Malay season two days later and also ended on 10 episodes. A spin-off, subtitled Woks Up (Chinese: 三把刀小贩开战), premiered on 14 October 2026.

== Gameplay ==
Each contestant will pit against one of three veteran chefs head-to-head, whom each hold one signature culinary knife placed under a shelf, and sitting chefs are backed as judges. At the start of each match, the contestant choose one of the chef and a designated ingredient required for cooking, but was not allowed to duplicate a cooking method. The contestant have up to 40 minutes to cook their dish, with the first 10 minutes set as a handicap for the veteran chef (one hour with a 15-minute handicap in season one), to prepare a dish and present it to a panel of three judges for testing and evaluation. The judges then make a decision to decide the winner for the match. Since season two, contestants have to defeat a mentee chef first before they could challenge against the three chefs, meaning that the contestant was now required to win four matches (one disciple and three chefs) to acquire all three knives. "Help cards" are also added, allowing the contestant to change the course of a match.

Winning each match awards contestants knife sets that they get to keep, regardless of their progress, as well as a cash amount. The payout structure for each win were $2,000, $3,000 and $4,000 ($1,000, $2,000 and $5,000 in season one). The contestant can decide either to leave the game with the cash amount they had already won, or risk their winnings to challenge another chef that they have not yet faced; losing to a chef at any time ends the game with no winnings except for the knife sets. Season four exclusively added an option to directly challenge a guest chef, bypassing the other two chefs for $4,000 and any remaining knives if they win.

Season three also added a season finale, dubbed The Final Showdown to determine the overall champion with a prize of up to $16,000. In season four, with the exception of the Tamil version, any contestants who won at least one knife in either the Chinese or Malay versions would be invited to the season finale where the winning chef would win a $5,000 cash bonus and $2,000 SharkNinja vouchers; there is no "final showdown" special.

Season five, as the title suggests, "the comeback" (Chinese: 再战擂台; pinyin: Zàizhànlèitái) features past contestants competing for a second time to either win more money and/or knives, under the same rules following the season two format. This was also used in the subsequent Malay and Tamil series, in addition to brand new contestants.

=== Cast ===
The Chinese version was first presented by Lee Teng in the first season, with professional chefs Eric Neo, Eric Teo and Pung Lu Tin acting as incumbents. Since season two, Cavin Soh, who previously served as a judge in season 1, took over as host, while the three chefs reprised their roles. Season four added James Tay as its fourth professional chef. A celebrity spin-off series, Woks Up was filmed on 17 July 2026 at Waterway Point, and will be hosted by Kym Ng with a new set of three chefs acting as judges.

The Malay version was presented by Farhana M Noor with their professional chefs being Shahrizal Salleh, Iskander Latiff and Khaled Shrafodden. The Tamil version was hosted by Udaya Soundari while Anand Kumar, S.R. Bala and Thanabalan assuming their roles as professional chefs. All the chefs and hosts reprised their roles in succeeding seasons. Hossan Leong hosted The Final Showdown.

== Series overview ==
=== Main series ===
Indicates champions who won all three knives.

S.	Duration		Ep.	Chinese			Malay			Tamil		
S.	Premiere	Finale	Ep.	Premiere	Finale	Winner	Premiere	Finale	Winner	Premiere	Finale	Winner
1	3 July 2019	2 October 2019	13	3 July 2019	2 October 2019	Royce Tan (Note: The season winner is defined based on the contestant winning the most knives at the end of the season. At the end of season one, Royce Tan is the only chef to win two out of three knives.)	Not held					
2	18 November 2020	17 February 2021	13	18 November 2020	17 February 2021	Multiple chefs (Note: The season winner is defined based on the contestant winning the most knives at the end of the season. Multiple chefs won two knives at the end of the season.)	Not held					
3	20 August 2022	3 December 2022	34 (Note: Consist of 10 episodes for each of the three versions of Chinese, Malay and Tamil, plus four episodes for "The Final Showdown", which aired from 12 November thru 3 December 2022.)	24 August 2022	2 November 2022	Hue Tran Thi Ngoc Anh (Note: Overall winner of "The Final Showdown".)	23 August 2022	1 November 2022	Zakiyah Jaleel	20 August 2022	28 October 2022	Gopica "Rasathi" Rasiah
4	6 September 2024	15 December 2024	30 (Note: Consist of 10 episodes for each of the three versions of Chinese, Malay and Tamil.)	6 September 2024	15 November 2024	Amanda Chia	24 September 2024	3 December 2024	Nabawi Mohktar	12 October 2024	15 December 2024	Ilayaraja
5	25 March 2026	2 November 2026	30	25 March 2026	27 May 2026	Hue Tran Thi Ngoc Anh (Note: Hue Tran Thi Ngoc Anh and Lim Kuang Haw were the biggest winners when both chefs won all three knives at the end of the season, while Hue would go on to defeat Lim Kuang Haw during the final tiebreaker in Season 3 of the Chinese version to become that season's first two-time overall champion of the series in both seasons (withstanding The Final Showdown).)	31 August 2026	2 November 2026	Dirah Hassan	29 August 2026	31 October 2026	Jaya Chitra Isuran

==== Season overview ====
At the end of season 1, 10 out of 26 chefs had won at least one set of knife for winning a match (Teo won 8 out of 12 matches, Pung won 7 out of 11 matches, and Neo won 8 out of 11 matches); one of the winning contestant, Royce Lee (with two episodes airing 18 and 25 September) won two knives and $2,000 though not deciding to risk the prize money to contest Neo for the third knife.

At the end of season 2, Teo won 3 out of 5 matches, Pung won 3 out of 5 matches (with one draw), and Neo won 4 out of 6 matches. A few chefs also won two knives but did not risk it for a third knife. The season finale feature a fight between the disciples and the chefs, with the latter winning.

At the end of season 3, one chef named Zakiyah Jaleel become the first contestant to win all three knives; she competed against Vietnam-Chinese home cook Hue Tran Thi Ngoc Anh and Indian cook Gopica "Rasathi" Rasiah in the final showdown. Hue won the showdown.

At the end of season 4, chefs who secured at least one knife were invited to the finale in episode 10 in the respective divisions. In the Chinese version, four chefs won at least one knife: The winner was Amanda Chia, who also previously competed in the fourth season of MasterChef Singapore, Bernice Tan was the runner-up, while Jason Ang and Tee Leong Choon both finished as semi-finalists. In the Malay version, two chefs won at least one knife: Nabawi Mohktar was the winner while Hidayat was the runner-up. In the Tamil version, Ilayaraja was the winner.

At the end of season 5, the two contestants who won the most knives in Season 3 of the Chinese version, Lim Kuang Haw and Hue Tran Thi Ngoc Anh, who also won The Final Showdown in season 3, became the second and third contestants respectively to win all three knives, making Hue the first two-time champion. In the Malay version, Dirah Hassan become the fourth contestant to win all three knives. In the Tamil version, Jaya Chitra Isuran is the only chef to win two knives thus making her the season's winner.

=== Spin-offs series ===
S.	Duration		Ep.
S.	Premiere	Finale	Ep.
Woks Up	14 October 2026	Ongoing season	
