= Baby Boom (Singaporean TV series) =

- 我家四个宝
- Genre: Dramedy; Family
- Directed by: Zhang Baolian
- Starring: Li Nanxing; Zoe Tay; Gurmit Singh; Pan Lingling
- Opening theme: 《我家四个宝》 by Benny Wong, sung by Li Nanxing, Zoe Tay, Gurmit Singh and Pan Lingling
- Country of origin: Singapore
- Original language: Mandarin
- No. of episodes: 20

Production
- Running time: approx. 46 minutes

Original release
- Network: MediaCorp Channel 8
- Release: September 2003

Baby Boom (我家四个宝) is a Singaporean TV series aired on MediaCorp Channel 8 in 2003.

== Synopsis ==
Tim and Kim are a yuppie married couple who would rather pursue a stylish lifestyle than start a family. They both have successful careers as a company executive and a director respectively. However they discover that they are unable to connect with other family members and friends who are already married or have children. Kim later discovers she is expecting quadruplets.

== Cast ==
- Li Nanxing as Tim
- Zoe Tay as Kim
- Gurmit Singh as Adam
- Pan Lingling as Lu Xiaofen 卢晓纷, Adam's wife
- Mai Haowei as Kim's father
- Li Yinzhu as Chen A-Mei 陈阿美, Kim's mother
- Zen Chong as James, Kim's brother
- Liang Tian as Cai Mingzheng 蔡铭政, Tim's father
- Hong Huifang as Cai Jingwen 蔡静文, Tim's older sister
- Li Wenhai as Song Junyu 宋君宇, Jingwen's husband
- Michelle Saram as Kristen
- Zhu Houren as Colin

== 2003 Accolades ==
Award	Nominee	Result
Best Actress 最佳女主角	Zoe Tay 郑惠玉	Nominated
Most Popular Drama Serial (Malaysia)	Baby Boom	Won
Best Theme Song 最佳主题曲	《我家四个宝》	Nominated
Best Cameraman	Lee Heng Soon	Won
