= Romance in the 7th Month =

1994 Singaporean television film

- Promotional poster
- Chinese: 七月幽情
- Hanyu Pinyin: Qī yuè yōu qíng
- Genre: Romance; Supernatural
- Screenplay by: Ng Chong-chow
- Directed by: Michael Woo
- Starring: Chew Chor Meng; Cynthia Koh; Henry Tee
- Music by: Tang Mingxin
- Country of origin: Singapore
- Original language: Mandarin

Production
- Executive producer: Michael Woo
- Cinematography: Gao Zhihong
- Editor: Yang Yaozong
- Running time: 90 minutes
- Production company: Singapore Broadcasting Corporation

Original release
- Network: Channel 8
- Release: 3 December 1994

Romance in the 7th Month (Chinese: 七月幽情) is a 1994 Singaporean television film directed and executive-produced by Michael Woo. It stars Chew Chor Meng, Cynthia Koh and Henry Tee. It received positive reviews from critics and audiences.

== Synopsis ==
A getai singer meets an attractive looking young man at a show and helps him to reconnect with his ailing father, not knowing that the young man had died ten years ago in a traffic accident.

== Cast ==
- Chew Chor Meng as Hong Dazhi
- Cynthia Koh as Qiu Qing
- Henry Tee as Shao Yunkun
- Wu Weiqiang as Uncle Hong
- Ang Puay Heng as Ah Chi
- He Qitang as Getai emcee A
- Steven Woon as Uncle An
- Yang Yue as Chen
- Bai Yan as Elderly man A
- Chen Tianxiang as Elderly man B
- Wang Xiuyun as Li's mother
- Liang Baozhu as Shao Zhizhong
- Chen Xuefen as Li Ailing
- Chen Zhonghua as Truck driver
- Zhang Yunhong as Getai emcee B
- Chen Yining as Xiaoli
- Lin Li as Getai emcee C
- Liu Lingling as Getai emcee D

== Production ==
Principal photography began in August 1994, during the Hungry Ghost Festival where scenes are shot at getai shows. Filming was completed in mid-September 1994.
