= Wang Xiuyun =

Singaporean actress (1945 – 2017)

- Born: May 31, 1945; Singapore
- Died: 9 August 2017 (aged 72)
- Burial place: Mandai Crematorium and Columbarium
- Occupation: Actress
- Years active: 1980–2017
- Children: 1

Chinese name
- Traditional Chinese: 王秀雲
- Simplified Chinese: 王秀云
- Hanyu Pinyin: Wáng Xiùyún

Wang Xiuyun (31 May 1945 – 9 August 2017) was a Singaporean actress who was prominently a full-time Mediacorp artiste. She died from kidney failure.

She was best known for her roles in local television dramas broadcast in the 1980s and 1990s, particularly A Mother's Love (1989).

== Personal life ==
A pioneer of Singapore's television industry, Wang began her career in the 1970s with Radio Television Singapore. According to an 8 Days article, Wang left showbiz in 1998, though she still took on part-time roles. She then worked in retail in Metro before moving on to sell kitchenware in Takashimaya.

== Death ==
Wang died from kidney failure on 9 August 2017. Actress Xiang Yun first broke the news of Wang's death on her Instagram. The actress shared that “her heart was heavy after hearing the news of Aunty Wang’s death”.

She described the late Wang as having “a sweet smile, big round eyes and a sweet voice” adding that she was always approachable and took care of her younger colleagues. Aside from Xiang Yun, other past and present Mediacorp stars such as Zheng Geping, Hong Huifang and Chen Xiuhuan turned up at Wang's wake at Ang Mo Kio Avenue 8. Wang is survived by her only daughter Ms Han Hua.

== Selected filmography ==
=== Television series ===
| Year | Title | Role | Notes |
|---|---|---|---|
| 1989 | A Mother's Love (亲心唤我心) | Cheng Cailan | |
| 1989 | Samsui Women | Ah Rong | |
| 1989 | Good Morning, Sir! | Ye Laixiang | |
| 2009 | Housewives' Holiday | Liu Lianhua | |

=== Film ===
| Year | Title | Role | Ref |
|---|---|---|---|
| 1994 | Romance in the 7th Month | Li's mother | Telemovie |
