= Cavin Soh =

Singaporean actor, host and singer (born 1970)

- Born: 17 November 1970 (age 56); Singapore
- Education: Maris Stella High School; Ngee Ann Polytechnic
- Alma mater: University of Glasgow
- Occupations: Actor; host; singer
- Years active: 1990s-present
- Agent: Hype Records
- Spouse: Serena Yeo (m. 2009)
- Children: 2
- Awards: Star Awards 2005: Best Supporting Actor; Star Awards 2014: Best Info-ed Programme Show Host

Current stage name
- Traditional Chinese: 蘇梽誠
- Simplified Chinese: 苏梽诚
- Hanyu Pinyin: Sū Zhīcheng

Birth name
- Traditional Chinese: 蘇智誠
- Simplified Chinese: 苏智诚
- Hanyu Pinyin: Sū Zhīcheng

Former stage name
- Traditional Chinese: 蘇志誠
- Simplified Chinese: 苏志诚
- Hanyu Pinyin: Sū Zhīcheng

Cavin Soh (born 17 November 1970) is a Singaporean actor, host, watch dealer and singer.

== Career ==
Soh was formerly the lead singer of the band Dreamz FM (梦飞船) and a radio deejay on MediaCorp's Chinese language station Y.E.S. 93.3FM before switching to television and acting. In 2005, he won the Best Supporting Actor award for his portrayal of Zhou Daqiu, the main antagonist, in Portrait of Home. Also, the character was voted the Top 10 Most Memorable Villains at the Star Awards 2007 anniversary special.

While acting in various television series, Soh still maintains his musical interests. He has written and performed the theme songs of a number of drama series and was a judge on SuperBand and Campus SuperStar.

== Personal life ==
Soh was schooled at Maris Stella High School (primary and secondary). Afterwards, he graduated with a Diploma in Mechanical Engineering at Ngee Ann Polytechnic. Thereafter, he earned a honours degree from the University of Glasgow, Scotland.

Soh married Serena Yeo in December 2009, and they have a son and a daughter.

== Filmography ==
=== Television series ===
Year	Title	Role	Notes	Ref.
2002	Don't Worry, Be Happy	Sotong(Soh Tong Ni)	Sitcom	
2002	Taste of Life			
2003	True Heroes	Wu Zhiguang		
2003	A Child's Hope	Fan Danshun		
2003	Home in Toa Payoh	Zhou Pengkun		
2004	I Love My Home			
2005	My Lucky Charm	Chen Qingyun		
2005	Portrait of Home	Zhou Daqiu		
2005	Portrait of Home II	Zhou Daqiu		
2006	My Sassy Neighbour II	Ah Huat		
2006	A Million Treasures			
2007	Mars vs Venus	Hanns		
2007	Metamorphosis	Jin Yongjian		
2008	Our Rice House	Xiao Fan		
2008	Love Blossoms II	Pan Jiaqiang		
2009	Perfect Cut II	Patrick		
2009	Your Hand in Mine	Wu Youli		
2010	Mrs P.I.	Zhang Yongjun		
2010	Secret Garden		Cameo	
2011	The In-Laws	Wang Jieqi		
2011	Love Thy Neighbour	Dai Deliang		
2012	Jump!	Yan Tianfa		
2012	Yours Fatefully	Wu Zhenbang		
2012	Don't Stop Believin'	Zhou Yaoguang		
2013	C.L.I.F. 2	Jimmy Dai Dadong		
2013	Disclosed	Guo Zijian		
2014	C.L.I.F. 3	Jimmy Dai Dadong		
2014	Against the Tide	Chen Zhifeng	Cameo	
2014	118	Lin Zhigao		
2015	Let It Go	Man, Wen Xiongqiang		
2015	Life Is Beautiful	Fei Ge		
2016	Eat Already?	Big Boss		
2016	118 II	Lin Zhigao		
2017	Home Truly	Bao Weibin		
2017	Mightiest Mother In Law	Zhang Zhongming		
2017	My Teacher Is a Thug	Zeng Guangrong		
2018	Jalan Jalan (带你去走走)	Liu Jiannan		
2019	Hello From The Other Side-Its Time (阴错阳差 — 时辰到)	Luo Wen		
2019	The Good Fight (致胜出击)	Simon Leong		
2020	A Quest to Heal	Hao Si Wen		
2020	Recipe of Life	Qian Ruowei		
2021	The Peculiar Pawnbroker (人心鉴定师)	Su Kaili		
2021	Mr Zhou's Ghost Stories@Job Haunting	Seng		
2022	Dark Angel	Su Zhian		
2022	Soul Detective	Wu Meizhen		
2022	Sunny Side Up	Vincent Ong		
2023	Fix My Life	Li Qihuan		
2023	Cash on Delivery	Wu Weizhong		
2023	Stranger in the Dark	Mr Goh		
2024	To Be Loved	John		
2024	If Tomorrow Comes	Henry		
2025	I Believe I Can Fly	Lin Guo Cheng		
2025	Emerald Hill - The Little Nyonya Story	Qian Duo Duo		
2025	The Gift Of Time			

=== Variety show ===
Year	Title	Notes	Ref.
2006	Night Walk 步夜城		
2006	Where the Queue Starts 排排站,查查看	Co-hosted with Bryan Wong	
2007	Where the Queue Starts 2 排排站,查查看2	Co-hosted with Bryan Wong; Nominated – Best Variety Show Host, Star Awards 2007	
2007	Barter Trade II 物物大交换II		
2008	Junior Home Decor Survivor 迷你摆家乐		
2009	Where the Queue Starts 3 排排站,查查看3	Co-hosted with Bryan Wong	
2010	Gatekeepers	Guest appearance (2 episodes)	
2012	Knock! Knock! Who's There? 啊!是你到我家!	Nominated, Best Variety Show Host, Star Awards 2013 Co-hosted with Bryan Wong ||	
2013	Where the Queue Starts 4 排排站,查查看4	Co-hosted with Bryan Wong	
2013	Let's Cook 全民新煮意	Won, Best Info-ed Programme Show Host, Star Awards 2014 Co-hosted with Quan Yi Fong ||	
2014	Back to School 超龄插班生	Co-hosted with Jeremy Tian	
2019	The Destined One	Guest matchmaker	
2021	King of Culinary 三把刀	Guest judge (season 1); Host (season 2-present)	

== Discography ==
=== Television series theme songs ===
Song	Series	Notes
《迟》	A Quest to Heal	Ending Theme Song
《Learn To Let Go》	Jalan Jalan 帶你去走走	Ending Theme Song
《路过》	The In-Laws	
《知足》	The Best Things in Life	Nominated – Best Drama Theme Song, Star Awards 2011
《想握你的手》	Your Hand in Mine	episodes 91 – 180
《企鹅爸爸》	Daddy at Home	Nominated – Best Drama Theme Song, Star Awards 2010
《太习惯》	Love Blossoms II	
《完整》	Love Blossoms II	
《无可取代》	Love Blossoms (I & II)	
《心花朵朵开》	Love Blossoms (I & II)	Nominated – Best Drama Theme Song, Star Awards 2009
《自己的天空》	Home in Toa Payoh	Nominated – Best Drama Theme Song, Star Awards 2004
《身边的你》	Viva Le Famille II	Nominated – Best Drama Theme Song, Star Awards 2003

=== Dreamz FM ===
==== Singles ====
Year	Song	Notes
1999	"Together" 《心连心》	Sung with Evelyn Tan; National Day 1999 theme song
2001	《天外有情》	Theme song of Master Swordsman Lu Xiaofeng 2
2001	《天天好心情》	Theme song of Story of Ah-Can
2002	《快乐至上》	One of the theme songs of Springs of Life
2016	Jiak Ba Buay (吃饱没)	Theme song of Jiak Ba Buay
2022	When Duty Calls 2 (卫国先锋2)	Theme song of Nu Fang (怒放)

== Awards and nominations ==
Year	Ceremony	Category	Nominated work	Result	Ref
2003	Star Awards	Best Theme Song	Viva Le Famille II	Nominated	
2004	Star Awards	Best Theme Song	Home in Toa Payoh	Nominated	
2005	Star Awards	Best Supporting Actor	Portrait of Home (as Zhou Daqiu)	Won	
2007	Star Awards	Best Supporting Actor	Mars vs Venus (as Hanns)	Nominated	
2007	Star Awards	Best Variety Show Host	Where The Queue Starts 2	Nominated	
2007	Star Awards	Top 10 Most Memorable Villains	Portrait of Home (as Zhou Daqiu)	Won	
2009	Star Awards	Best Theme Song	Love Blossoms	Nominated	
2010	Star Awards	Best Theme Song	Daddy at Home	Nominated	
2011	Star Awards	Best Theme Song	The Best Things in Life	Nominated	
2012	Star Awards	Best Supporting Actor	Love Thy Neighbour (as Dai Deliang)	Nominated	
2013	Star Awards	Best Variety Show Host	Knock! Knock! Who's There?	Nominated	
2014	Star Awards	Best Info-ed Show Host	Let's Cook	Won	
2017	Star Awards	Top 10 Most Popular Male Artistes	—N/a	Top 20	
2021	Star Awards	Best Programme Host	King of Culinary S2	Nominated	
2023	Star Awards	Top 10 Most Popular Male Artistes	—N/a	Nominated	
2024	Star Awards	Top 10 Most Popular Male Artistes	—N/a	Nominated	
