= The Unbeatables III =

Singaporean TV show

- 双天至尊III
- Genre: Gambling
- Directed by: Edmund Tse
- Starring: Li Nanxing; Zoe Tay
- Opening theme: 灰色地带 (Grey Zone) by Tay Ping Hui
- Country of origin: Singapore
- Original language: Mandarin
- No. of episodes: 30

Production
- Running time: 46 minutes

Original release
- Network: MediaCorp Channel 8
- Release: 18 November 2002

Related
- The Unbeatables I The Unbeatables II

The Unbeatables III (Chinese: 双天至尊 III) is a Singaporean Mandarin-language drama serial which was broadcast on 18 November 2002, on MediaCorp Channel 8, and ran for 30 episodes.

Produced by Mediacorp, the drama is the third and last drama in The Unbeatables series, and was broadcast six years after The Unbeatables II.

== Plot ==
Since the defeat of Ye Zhong in the previous series, Yan Fei has retired from the gambling scene, leaving Coral Island with his wife, Luo Qifang and his son, Yan Xing. However, Qifang was embroiled in a mysterious murder case at a casino, and was sentenced to life imprisonment at a prison located on a remote island. Fei, however, made efforts to see Qifang during all visitation dates, rain or shine.

A decade later, Fei has become a big philanthropist on Coral Island, taking an active role in charitable endeavours, as well as building bridges and repairing roads. Fei also donates 90% of the casino's proceeds to the government, and also forbade Coral Island locals from losing large sums of cash at his casino. As a result, Fei was praised by islanders as a philanthropic gambling king.

Fei's philanthropic endeavours, however, were done for one purpose: to effect Qifang's release from prison by impressing political figures on Coral Island. Meanwhile, gambling figures from abroad arrived at Coral Island to challenge Fei, and attempted to force him to hand over the gambling license he has held for years. One of Fei's challengers is Luo Shenfeng. Fei, however, resisted all challenges, knowing his operation of the gambling business is Qifang's only hope of a release from prison.

Fei's son, Yan Xing, returned from abroad and now grown up, with a dream of following his dad's footstep as a gambling king. Fei, disappointed, forbade his son to do so, and also refused to pass on any of his skills to him, out of a fear that Xing would become entangled in the affairs of the gambling scene. Instead, Fei passed on his gambling skills to three disciples: Wu Youkang, Dong Meiyao and Ding Wei, in hopes that one of them could take over his gambling empire.

Meanwhile, Dong Sihai changed his looks and posed as Huang Yunjiu, a professional gambler, in an effort to avenge his wife's death by getting rid of Qifang. Yunjiu first befriended Shenfeng to join forces against Fei, and later got Xing involved, baiting him with the promise of holding the gambling king throne that Fei holds.

Xing's parents were heartbroken after learning that Xing has turned on them, acknowledging Yunjiu as his mentor. Yunjiu then sent assassins after Qifang, who was saved by a nurse named Jiang Yexue. Yexue was saved by Fei in the past, when Fei helped her out of an immoral deal with Shenfeng, when she tried to pay off her brother's gambling debts. Since that time, Yexue also began to develop feelings for Fei.

Meiyao, the three disciples that Fei chose to pass on his skills to, was later revealed to be Yunjiu's daughter, and was forced by her father to betray Fei, which caused Fei to have amnesia. Xing then took advantage of the opportunity to force Qifang back to the gambling arena. Qifang was at a loss, with no one to turn to and discovering Fei's amorous relationship with Yexue.

Fei eventually regained his memory, and discovered that Xing had forced his mother into a life-and-death gamble. He then decided to take his wife's place, hoping that he could bring back Xing's conscience.

== Cast ==
- Li Nanxing as Yan Fei
- Zoe Tay as Luo Qifang
- Lee San San as Jiang Yexue
- Ken Cai as Yan Xing
- Willy Liu as Yan Xing (Older)
- Tay Ping Hui as Luo Shenfeng / Luo Yingfeng
- Huang Yiliang as Huang Yunjiu / Dong Sihai
- Allan Wu as Ding Wei
- Vivian Lai as Dong Meiyao
- Cassandra See as Luo Wenxin
- San Yow as Jiang Xueming
- Wang Deyuan as Wu Youkang
- Joey Swee as Jia Jia
- Henry Thia as Ding Shiyi
- Le Yao as Jiang Xiaotong
- Jin Yinji as Auntie Qian

== Production ==
Portions of the series were shot in Australia, while an entire casino was built in Studio 6 of Mediacorp's former campus at Caldecott Hill for the casino scenes.

Mediacorp spent S$1.5 million on animated special effects for the series.

== Accolades ==
Organisation	Year	Award	Nominee(s)	Result	Ref
Star Awards	2003	Best Actor	Li Nanxing	Nominated	
Star Awards	2003	Best Drama Serial	The Unbeatables III	Nominated	
Star Awards	2003	Best Drama Theme Song	"灰色地带"	Nominated	
Star Awards	2003	Best Director	Edmund Tse	Won	
