= Taste of Love (Singaporean TV series) =

- 缘之烩
- Genre: Modern Drama
- Written by: Chen Yao; Tan Wen
- Starring: Dawn Yeoh; Dai Xiangyu; Chen Hanwei; Michelle Chia
- Opening theme: 我是你的天空 by Ocean Ou
- Ending theme: 眼里眉间 by Joi Chua
- Country of origin: Singapore
- Original language: Chinese
- No. of episodes: 21

Production
- Producer: Wong Yau Hong
- Running time: 45 minutes

Original release
- Network: MediaCorp Channel 8
- Release: 22 January – 22 February 2008

Related
- The Golden Path; Just in Singapore

Taste of Love (Chinese: 缘之烩) is a Singaporean Chinese modern romance drama about three good friends. It was telecasted on Singapore's free-to-air channel, MediaCorp Channel 8. It made its debut on 22 January 2008 and ended on 22 February 2008. This drama serial consists of 21 episodes, and was screened on every weekday night at 9:00 pm.

== Synopsis ==
Tao Le, Ye Yutong and Yu Lingzhi are best friends since young. While Lingzhi is a modern independent lady with many suitors, both Tao Le and Yutong aspire to be great chefs. However, this ambition turned the two friends against each other as the jealous Yutong begins thwarting Tao Le's plan as she tries to revive her grandmother's restaurant.

At the same time, a love triangle develops between Tao Le, Lingzhi, and Fang Youfang, a tenant living under Tao Le's roof. The relationship is made complicated when Lingzhi's boss, Hu Yingbang enters the picture.

== Cast ==
=== Main cast ===
- Dawn Yeoh as Tao le 陶乐
- Dai Xiangyu as Fang You Fang
- Michelle Chia as Yu Ling Zhi
- Chen Hanwei as Hu Ying Bang
- Candice Liu 刘容嘉 as Ye Yu Tong

=== Supporting cast ===
- Jimmy Nah as Yu Du Zhong
- May Phua as Ding Li Yi
- Ye Shipin as Tao Da Cheng
- Zeng Shao Zhong as Tao Xi 陶喜
- Jacqueline Sue as Ye Yu Xin
- Zheng Geping as Wang Xue Ren
- Chen Shucheng as Qiang Ge
- Tan Xin Yi as Yu Tong (Young)

== Release ==
=== Broadcast ===
Three weeks before Taste of Love was broadcast in Singapore, cast member Jimmy Nah died.

== Ratings ==
Week	Episode	Date	Percentage of population (Round off to nearest 0.1%)
Week 1	Episodes 1 to 4	22 January 2008 to 25 January 2008	15.1%
Week 2	Episodes 5 to 9	28 January 2008 to 1 February 2008	16.2%
Week 3	Episodes 10 to 14	4 February 2008 to 8 February 2008	14.9%
