= The Unbeatables II =

- 双天至尊II
- Genre: Gambling
- Starring: Li Nanxing; Zoe Tay
- Opening theme: 《当爱擦身而过》 by Jonathan Lee & Zoe Tay
- Ending theme: 1.《我知道》by Emil Chau; 2.《就是你》 by Zoe Tay
- Country of origin: Singapore
- No. of episodes: 30

Production
- Running time: 60 minutes

Original release
- Network: MediaCorp TV Channel 8
- Release: 15 November – 26 December 1996

Related
- Three-In-One Love 爱情三合一; Creative Edge 创意先锋; The Unbeatables I; The Unbeatables III

The Unbeatables II (双天至尊II) is a Singapore Chinese drama series and the sequel to the highly successful drama series The Unbeatables I.

== Cast ==
- Li Nanxing as Yan Fei
- Zoe Tay as Luo Qifang/Long Jiajia/Huang Yuefang
- Chew Chor Meng as Ding Zhaohui
- Zhu Houren as Long Tingguang
- Chen Shucheng as Yan Kun
- He Weiming as Yan Xing
- Liu Qianyi as Huang Wu
- Kenneth Tsang as Ye Zhong
- Zio Zio Lim as Huang Jia-er
- Cassandra See as Luo Wenxin
- Yu Rongguang as Zhuang Weicheng

== Synopsis ==
Set 4 years after the end of The Unbeatables I.

In Las Vegas, a senior of Long Tingguang, Ye Zhong, undertakes a gambling competition with four other legendary gambling from around the world. After the game was won by him, the media present at the event claimed and labelled him the "King of Gamblers". However, he refuses to accept the title, and instead introduced 4 different significant people on the screens:

- King of Deception, Long Tingguang - turned insane after he lost a gambling match to Yan Fei four years ago.
- Queen of Gamblers, Luo Qifang - rumored to be dead.
- King of Gamblers, Yan Kun - disappeared after his son won the match against Long Tingguang.
- New Generation King of Gamblers, Yan Fei - still active and his gambling skills has improved.

Ye Zhong declared that only when he beats Yan Fei on the gambling table will he be fit to be the "King of Gamblers".

Although Wenxin kept telling him that Luo Qifang is dead, Yan Fei insisted otherwise. Over 4 years, he travelled the world with his and Qifang's son, Yan Xing, hoping to find Qifang. When Yan Fei and Yan Xing got back to Coral Island, Wenxin refused to meet both father and son. As the pair stood in the rain waiting, Wenxin had series of flashbacks.

- 4 years ago, Qifang took a bullet in the head for Yan Fei. Before she went for surgery, she wanted Wenxin to promise her 2 things: let Yan Fei have the custody of their son, and if the surgery is successful, she doesn't want anything to do with Yan Fei anymore. After the surgery, Qifang lost her memory and forgotten her past with Yan Fei. Wenxin decided to fulfill her promise by faking Qifang's death, sending her to Switzerland, and giving her a new name - Huang Yuefang, and a new father - Huang Wu.

== Production ==
Location shots include San Francisco and Las Vegas in the US.

== Nominations ==
1997 Star Awards
Award	Nominee	Result
Best Actor 最佳男主角	Li Nanxing	Nominated
Best Supporting Actress 最佳女配角	Cassandra See	Nominated
Best Drama Serial 最佳电视剧	—N/a	Nominated
