= Double Bonus =

2011 Singaporean television series

- 双星报喜
- Genre: Fantasy; Comedy; Chinese New Year
- Written by: Chen Siew Khoon 陈秀群; Goh Chwee Chwee 吴翠翠
- Starring: Zoe Tay; Terence Cao; Michelle Chia; Zhang Yao Dong; Mimi Chu; Chen Shucheng
- Country of origin: Singapore
- Original language: Mandarin
- No. of episodes: 23

Production
- Producer: Soh Bee Lian
- Running time: 60 minutes (approx.)

Original release
- Network: Mediacorp Channel 8
- Release: January 3 – February 3, 2012

Related
- A Song to Remember; Rescue 995

Double Bonus is a Singaporean Chinese drama which was telecasted on Singapore's free-to-air channel, MediaCorp Channel 8. It stars Zoe Tay, Terence Cao, Michelle Chia, Zhang Yao Dong, Mimi Chu & Chen Shucheng of this series. This drama serial consists of 23 episodes. It made its debut on 3 January 2012 and was screened on Channel 8 at 2,100 hrs on every weekday night.

== Cast ==
Cast	Role	Relationship
Zoe Tay	Li Meifeng	Junjie's wife
Zoe Tay	Little Handsome God (possessed)	Possessed Meifeng; Little Fortune God's younger brother
Terence Cao	Jin Junjie	Meifeng's husband Son of Shujiao and Wentao
Michelle Chia	Isabella	Junyang's wife Owner of New Yong Jia
Zhang Yao Dong	Jin Junyang	Isabella's husband Second son of Shujiao and Wentao; Owner of New Yong Jia
Tracy Lee	Jin Peiling	Air stewardess Youngest daughter of Shujiao and Wentao; Michael's ex-girlfriend Romeo's girlfriend
Ya Hui	Tian Mi	Tian Xin's younger sister
Kate Pang	Tian Xin	A tenant of Shujiao's; Daqi's girlfriend
Tom Price	Romeo Yang	A tenant of Shujiao's; Fitness instructor Peiling's boyfriend
Tom Price	Little Fortune God (possessed)	Possessed Romeo; Little Handsome God's brother
Rayson Tan	Liu Daqi	Shujiao's "long lost brother" Tian Xin's boyfriend
Mimi Chu	Liu Shujiao	Wentao's wife Owner of Yongjia Bakkwa
Chen Shucheng	Jin Wentao	Shujiao's husband
Hong Damu	Yang Lifang	Meifeng's mother Romeo's "girlfriend"
Bobby Tonelli	Michael	American accent Peiling's ex-boyfriend
Hu Wensui		

== Episodes ==
No.	Title	Original release date
1	"Episode 1"	January 3, 2012
2	"Episode 2"	January 4, 2012
3	"Episode 3"	January 5, 2012
4	"Episode 4"	January 6, 2012
5	"Episode 5"	January 9, 2012
6	"Episode 6"	January 10, 2012
7	"Episode 7"	January 11, 2012
8	"Episode 8"	January 12, 2012
9	"Episode 9"	January 13, 2012
10	"Episode 10"	January 16, 2012
11	"Episode 11"	January 17, 2012
12	"Episode 12"	January 18, 2012
13	"Episode 13"	January 19, 2012
14	"Episode 14"	January 20, 2012
15	"Episode 15"	January 24, 2012
16	"Episode 16"	January 25, 2012
17	"Episode 17"	January 26, 2012
18	"Episode 18"	January 27, 2012
19	"Episode 19"	January 30, 2012
20	"Episode 20"	January 31, 2012
21	"Episode 21"	February 1, 2012
22	"Episode 22"	February 2, 2012
23	"Episode 23"	February 3, 2012

== Accolades ==
Organisation	Year	Category	Nominee	Result	Ref
Star Awards	2013	Young Talent Award	Jason Lee Kok Yang 李国扬	Nominated	

== See also ==
- List of programmes broadcast by Mediacorp Channel 8
- 8gg Blog
