= On the Fringe (1988 TV series) =

Singaporean television series

- 边缘少年
- Starring: Li Nanxing; Lin Meijiao; Huang Yiliang
- Opening theme: 边缘少年 by 姜鄂
- Original language: Mandarin (华语)
- No. of episodes: 25

Production
- Running time: ≈45 minutes

Original release
- Network: MediaCorp Channel 8
- Release: 18 April – 20 May 1988

Related
- Silk and Satin; The Last Applause

On the Fringe (Chinese: 边缘少年) is a Singaporean Chinese drama which was telecast on Singapore's free-to-air channel, MediaCorp Channel 8. It made its debut on 18 Apr 1988. This drama serial consisted of 25 episodes, and was broadcast every weekday night at 9.30 pm.

== Cast ==
- Li Nanxing as Chen Yong, the leader of the Roller Express gang. The lead role was originally offered to Eric Moo but was rejected by him.
- Chen Bifeng as Meifeng
- Zheng Wanling as Dangna
- Duan Weiming as Xie Abao
- Yang Libing as Zhang Xiaohua
- Weng Jiahong as Haocai
- Lin Meijiao
- Huang Yiliang
- Zheng Geping
- Steven Woon
- Dai Peng
- Wang Xiuyun
- Chen Juanjuan
- Pan En
- Liang Tian
- Richard Low
- Wu Weiqiang
- Guan Xinyi
- Cai Ducui
- Li Yinzhu
- Li Gongyu
- Wang Changli
- Chen Tianxiang
- Zhu Zuquan
- An Zheming
- Huang Fa
- Zeng Yaofeng
- Liang Baozhu
- Zhang Jinhua
- Chen Meiguang
- Yan Bingliang
- Ye Shipin

== Production ==
The drama's script is based on research from newspaper reports and interviews with students, teachers, social workers and probation officers.

== Original soundtrack ==
The drama's theme song is 'On the Fringe' sung by Thomas Teo.

== Reception ==
The drama received both positive and negative feedback from the public, warning that "this drama serial, to a large extent, glamorises gangs and gangsterism" while some said that it "enables adult viewers to understand the underlying cause... younger viewers realise the danger of hanging out with wrong people" and "unveiling the problems of these teenagers... deterring them from getting involved with gangsterism".
