= Liang Baozhu =

Singaporean actor (1931–2009)

- Liang in the 1990 drama series Journey's End
- Born: 2 July 1931; Singapore
- Died: 11 March 2009 (aged 77)
- Burial place: Mandai Crematorium and Columbarium
- Occupations: Actor; businessman; radio presenter
- Years active: 1957−2009
- Children: 4

Chinese name
- Traditional Chinese: 梁寶柱
- Simplified Chinese: 梁宝柱
- Hanyu Pinyin: Liáng Bǎozhù

Liang Baozhu (2 July 1931 − 11 March 2009) was a Singaporean actor, theatre and radio personnel who was best known for his leading role in the 1997 telemovie Grandpa's Bak Kut Teh (阿公肉骨茶), produced and written by theatre maestro Kuo Pao Kun.

== Career ==
Beginning his career on stage in 1957, Liang was also a Rediffusion Singapore Hakka-language radio presenter who wrote, directed and hosted radio segments and had acted in more than 1,000 radio plays. In 1975, Liang briefly joined the construction industry as a site supervisor and left two years later after the company closed during an economic downturn. Following which, he returned to acting and appeared in a number of local films. He became a full-time Singapore Broadcasting Corporation (SBC) actor in 1986.

In 1994, Liang did not renew his contract with SBC as his pay was reduced by almost 33% by the company. The reduction was made as he was not able to act in the expected quota set by the company.

In 1997, Liang opened a Traditional Chinese medicine shop in Ang Mo Kio while acting in local dramas on a part-time basis.

== Personal life ==
He was married with a son and three daughters.

== Death ==
On 11 March 2009, Liang died of pneumonia, aged 77. He suffered from diabetes for more than 20 years and had been diagnosed with nasopharynx cancer.

== Selected filmography ==
Liang appeared in the following programmes and films:

=== Television series ===
- The Bond (1986)
- Five Foot Way (1986)
- Samsui Women (1986)
- Fury of the Dragon (1987)
- On the Fringe (1988)
- Mystery (1988; chapter "Soul")
- Strange Encounter 2 (1988)
- Heiress (1988)
- Good Morning, Sir! (1989)
- A Long Way Home (1989)
- We Are Family (1989)
- Journey's End (1990)
- The Last Swordsman (1991)
- Heavenly Beings (1992)
- Fiery Lover (1993)
- That Moment In Time (1993)
- Dr Justice (1994)
- Silk and Romance (1995)

=== Film ===
- Head of the Household
- The Absurd Family
- Two Sides of the Bridge (1978)
- Romance in the 7th Month (1994; telemovie)
- Heart of the Family (1996; telemovie)
- Grandpa's Bak Kut Teh (1997; telemovie)
