= Xia Chuan =

Xia Chuan (1918–2005, Chinese: 夏川), formerly known as Lu Zhenhua (Chinese: 卢镇华) and Lu Xiangchen (Chinese: 卢向晨), was a native of Pingshan, Hebei Province. He was the vice chairman of the Tibet Autonomous Regional Committee of the Chinese People's Political Consultative Conference.

== Biography ==
In 1935, he was admitted to the Beiping Journalism College (Chinese: 北平新闻专科学校). In 1936, he was expelled from school for actively encouraging and organizing his classmates to participate in the demand that the KMT government cut off diplomatic relations with Japan. In 1937, he arrived in Taiyuan, Shanxi to join the Shanxi Sacrificial Salvation League (Chinese: 牺牲救国同盟会). In August, he joined the First General Unit of Shanxi Youth Anti-Enemy Death Squad (Chinese: 山西青年抗敌决死队第一总队) and changed his name to Lu Xiangchen. In May 1938, he joined the Eighth Route Army and changed his name to Xia Chuan. He has served as an officer of the Civil Transportation Department of the Field Political Department of the Eighth Route Army, secretary of the Party Branch of the Cultural and Industrial Troupe of the First Branch of the Resistance College.

In May 1945, Xia served as the publicity department of the Jiluyu military region as section chief. On November 22, 1945, the Ji-Lu-Yu military region seven columns was established, he served as seven columns of 21 brigade publicity section chief. In August 1946, he served as the seven columns of the Jiluyu military region publicity department deputy minister. In February 1949, he became the head of the publicity department of the 17th Army of the Fifth Corps. In February 1950, Xia Chuan, who was the publicity minister of the 17th Army of the Fifth Corps, met Zhang Guohua, the commander of the 18th Army, and at the latter's strong suggestion, he agreed to Zhang Guohua's invitation to transfer to be the publicity minister of the 18th Army to carry out the mission of marching into Tibet.

In 1952, after the establishment of the Tibet Military Region, he became the Minister of Publicity and Culture. 1954, he led a small team to carry out the mission of the General Political Department of the People's Liberation Army, arriving at the northern foot of Mount Everest at more than 6,000 meters to complete the movie shooting mission.

In August 1955, after Xia Chuan was transferred to August First Film Studio, he was responsible for the organization and leadership of military educational films and documentaries as the deputy director. During this period, the traditional militia education films The Eternal Wave (1958), Mine War (1962) and Tunnel War (1965), which he proposed and took charge of, became classics of Chinese cinema.

In 1980, he went to Tibet for the second time, where he served as deputy political commissar of the Tibet Military Region, and was also a member of the Standing Committee of the Tibet Autonomous Regional Committee of the Chinese Communist Party and vice-chairman of the Tibet Autonomous Regional Committee of the Chinese People's Political Consultative Conference (Standard Tibetan: ཀྲུང་གོ་མི་དམངས་ཆབ་སྲིད་གྲོས་མོལ་ཚོགས་འདུ་བོད་རང་སྐྱོང་ལྗོངས་ཨུ་ཡོན་ལྷན་ཁང་།). He began publishing his works in 1933 and joined the China Writers Association in 1991.

He died on August 25, 2005, at the age of 87 in Beijing.
