= Good Morning, Sir! =

- 早安老师!
- Genre: Drama
- Starring: Li Nanxing; Chen Liping; Zhu Houren; Hong Huifang; Xia Chuan; Aileen Tan; Madeline Chu; Hong Peixing; Jin Yinji; Lin Tianlong
- Country of origin: Singapore
- Original language: Mandarin
- No. of seasons: 1
- No. of episodes: 20

Original release
- Network: SBC Channel 8
- Release: May 22 – June 16, 1989

Good Morning, Sir! (Chinese: 早安老师!) is a Singaporean Chinese-language drama series. The series stars Li Nanxing, Chen Liping, Zhu Houren, Hong Huifang, Xia Chuan, Aileen Tan, Madeline Chu, Hong Peixing, Jin Yinji and Lin Tianlong. The series' theme song was sung by Li Ji Mei.

== Cast ==
- Li Nanxing as Zhou Wenjie
- Chen Liping as Shen Rong
- Zhu Houren as Yu Qingfeng
- Hong Huifang as Zhang Caiqin
- Xia Chuan as Li Jin Xi
- Aileen Tan as Zhu Peiqi
- Madeline Chu as Zeng Jinmei
- Jin Yinji
- Hong Peixing
- Lin Tianlong as He Shipei
- Wang Chang Li as Xu Jielong
- Tang Hu
- Liang Baozhu
- Chen Zhao Wen and Chen Zhao Xiang
- Aileen Chew
- Priscilla Deng
- David Leow Wah as Lin Apei
- Zhou Ailing
- Ying Ying as Zhou Wenfang

== Reception ==
Agnes Wee of Weekend East called the series a "light-hearted drama with a few exaggerated scenes that tend to lapse into slapstick comedy", and praised the performances of Chen and Li.
