= Li Nanxing =

Singaporean actor (born 1964)

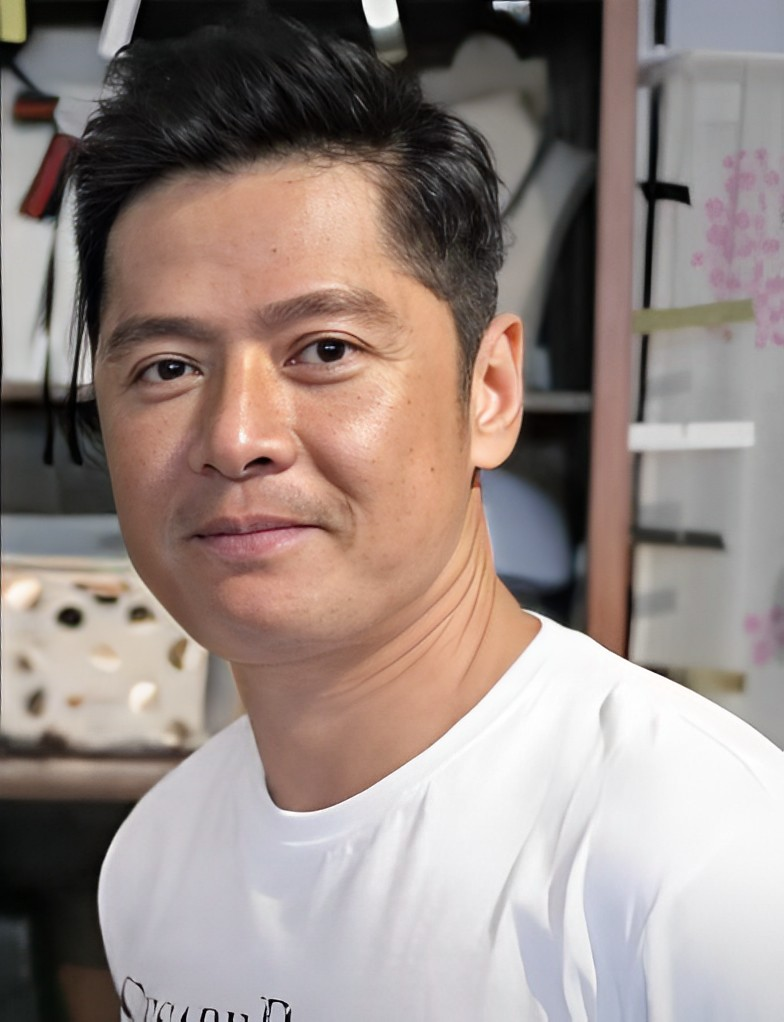
- Li in August 2017
- Born: Jonathan Lee Nam Heng; 7 November 1964 (age 62); Singapore
- Occupations: Actor; businessman; host; filmmaker
- Years active: 1986–present
- Spouse: Yang Libing (m. 1994; div. 2004)
- Awards: Full list

Chinese name
- Traditional Chinese: 李南星
- Simplified Chinese: 李南星
- Hanyu Pinyin: Lǐ Nánxīng
- Wade–Giles: Li2 Nan2 Hsing1
- Jyutping: Lei5 Naam4 Sing1
- Hokkien POJ: Lí Lâm-seng
- Tâi-lô: Lí Lâm-sing
- Website: linanxing.com

Li Nanxing (born Jonathan Lee Nam Heng on 7 November 1964) is a Singaporean actor who has been referred to as "Ah-Ge" (阿哥, "big brother") of Caldecott Hill. He is also a businessman and filmmaker.

Li has acted in many Chinese-language television dramas produced by MediaCorp Channel 8. He has won the Best Actor awards three times in the Star Awards, an annual acting awards in Singapore.

== Career ==
After Li served his NS, he attended Singapore Broadcasting Corporation's drama training course before debuting in 1986 with Crossroads (红绿灯 之《红灯》). Li gradually rose to stardom in the 1990s. In 1993, he rose to prominence when starring in The Unbeatables I, the first ever gambling drama series produced in Singapore, alongside Zoe Tay. For most of the 1990s, he, Tay and Chew Chor Meng were MediaCorp's three most popular actors and he was voted the Top 10 Most Popular Male Artistes ten years in a row and also won several Malaysia and Taiwan popularity polls at the Star Awards. In 2004 he was awarded the All-Time Favourite Artiste award.

During the late 2000s, his career hit a rocky phase due to personal issues. After a two-year hiatus, Li made his comeback in On the Fringe 2011 and also directed his first film, The Ultimate Winner. He also produced the film, Imperfect, which he co-starred with Ian Fang and Kimberly Chia.

Some of his more famous shows include The Unbeatables trilogy and The Magnate; Li has also acted in 6 telemovies to date, and even sang the theme song of several of his shows. He mostly played in anti-hero roles such in The Vagrant, for which he won the Best Actor award at the Star Awards 2002 and On the Fringe 2011. In September 2012 it was announced that he will be cast in C.L.I.F. II as a police officer, which will be one of the few times he plays a protagonist.

In 2019, Li signed to Zhao Wei's management agency to manage his presence in China. He was then cast in Zhao's web drama series, Everyone Wants To Meet You (谁都渴望遇见你), which was filmed in China, in the same year. The series was released in February 2020 on IQIYI.

== Business and ventures ==
In the 2000s, Li bought a fish farm and managed it with his uncle.

In 2004, Li founded his own talent management agency, LNX Global, named after his initials. Constance Song was LNX's first artiste to be managed by LNX in 2015.

Li also co-owns the Chinese dessert shop Tian Wang Desserts at Jalan Besar, which opened in March 2021. In addition, he has collaborated with other brands to sell his Curry Chicken and Dried Scallop Hae Bee Hiam Croissant at Bakers & Co in Holland Village, as well as launching his Dried Scallop Hae Bee Hiam Ramen with Japanese ramen chain Ippudo.

== Personal life ==
Li married actress Yang Libing in 1994 after co-starring together in several drama series. They divorced in 2004 citing irreconcilable personality differences. They have no children from the marriage.

Li battled with gambling addiction and had to work as a Hollywood ‘calefare’ to pay off his debts in the 1990s. During this period, he became a Christian, having credited a "miraculous" experience he had while on a karaoke trip with a friend in Thailand.

== Filmography ==
=== Film ===
Year	Title	Role	Notes
1994	Wounded Tracks (伤城记)	Xu Le	Telemovie
1995	Thorny Love (浪子的童话)	Hao	Telemovie
1995	Somewhere In Time (再世情缘)	Li Xiong	Telemovie
1995	What A Wonderful World (奇异旅程之真心爱生命)		
1996	Life On the Line (魂断四面佛)	Gu Yuming	Telemovie
1997	Courage Of Fire (炽火豪情)	Peng Jianxing	Telemovie
1997	The Test Of Time (三年零八个月)	Luo Wenfeng	Telemovie
2011	The Ultimate Winner	Shi Tiancai	Directorial debut
2012	Imperfect (我们都不完美)	Zhihua	Also as producer
2017	The Fortune Handbook	Ren Haoxing	

=== Television series ===
Year	Title	Role	Notes	Ref
1986	Neighbours (芝麻绿豆)			
1986	Under One Roof (家和万事兴)	Lixin		
1986	Crossroads (红绿灯 之 红灯)	Lu Rihua		
1987	Sunshine After Rain (雨过天晴)	Wu Jingtang		
1987	Paint a Rainbow (调色板)	Wu Qifan		
1987	Moving On (变迁)	Gao Xiaosheng		
1988	Airforce	Li Zhengting		
1988	On the Fringe	Chen Yong		
1988	Teahouse in Chinatown (牛车水人家)	Chen Dejian		
1988	My Fair Ladies (窈窕淑女)	Ding Lei		
1988	Song Of Youth (生活歌手)	Wei Jiahao		
1989	Good Morning, Sir!	Zhou Wenjie		
1989	Splash to Victory	Li Jiajun		
1989	A Mother's Love (亲心唤我心)	Ye Jianhui		
1990	Finishing Line	Xia Dejian		
1990	Happy Family (开心家族)	Situ Zhengting		
1990	Happy World (多多富贵多多情)	Wang Baiwan		
1991	Private Eyes (妙探智多星)	Chen Ya Jin		
1991	Black Phoenix (黑凤凰)	Wu Yunkai		
1992	Modern Romance (男欢女爱)	Li Junhao		
1992	My Buddies (浪漫战场)			
1992	Mystery II (迷离夜II)	Yang Tianwei / Wen Yufei		
1992	Breaking Point (暴风边缘)	Bai Yufeng		
1993	Smouldering Heat (赤道谜情)	Lu Haojie		
1993	Angel of Vengeance (暴雨狂花)	Qiao Kang		
1993	The Great Conspiracy (莲花争霸)	Shen Cong		
1993	The Unbeatables I	Li Jianfei / Yan Fei		
1994	Dreams Come True (美梦成真)	Lu Wenyang		
1994	Twin Bliss (龙凤呈祥)	You Long		
1994	The Magnate (叱咤风云)	Song Zhigao		
1995	The Shadow Mission (地下猎人)	Chen Zhixin		
1996	The Unbeatables II	Yan Fei		
1996	Diary of a Teacher (老师日记)	Yu Mingxing		
1997	Rising Expectations (长河)	Shi Guoying / Stone		
1997	Crime and Tribulations (狮城奇案录)	Chen Zhenwen		
1997	My Wife, Your Wife, Their Wives (101老婆)	Jian Qiang		
1998	The New Adventures of Wisely	Guo Zeqing		
1998	The Return of the Condor Heroes	Lu Liding		
1999	Coup de Scorpion (天蝎行动)	Zheng Nanshun		
1999	Bright Future (同一片蓝天)	Haisheng		
2000	Dare to Strike (扫冰者)	Wang Shen		
2001	The Hotel	Cloudy		
2001	Heroes in Black	Song Dou / Wolaiye		
2001	In Pursuit of Peace	Sakagami Ichiro		
2002	The Unbeatables III	Yan Fei		
2002	The Vagrant	Ah Bao / Liu Xiaoming		
2003	Home in Toa Payoh	Li Baomei		
2003	Baby Boom	Tim		
2003	Romance De Amour	Huang Weide		
2004	A Child's Hope II	Hu Yiming		
2006	A Million Treasures	Ma Da		
2006	Through It All	Guo Xianghai		
2006	The Undisclosed	Chen Musheng		
2007	The Homecoming	Dong Weihong		
2007	The Golden Path	Ah Jin / Jin Long		
2009	Daddy at Home	Liu Bang		
2009	The Ultimatum	Zhang Feng / Zhou Zhida		
2011	On The Fringe 2011	Tian Yibang		
2012	Beyond	Jiang Wei		
2013	C.L.I.F. 2	Wei Lantian		
2013	The Journey: A Voyage	Zhang Tianpeng		
2014	The Journey: Tumultuous Times	Zhang Tianpeng	Cameo	
2014	C.L.I.F. 3	Wei Lantian		
2014	Justice Heroes (廉政英雄)	Xia Junhong / Chen Xueliang	14 episodes	
2015	Dowry (嫁妝)	Sun Wenhua		
2015	The Dream Makers II	Lin Tao		
2015	A Blessed Life	Ye Daji		
2016	C.L.I.F. 4	Wei Lantian		
2017	My Teacher Is a Thug	Jia Tianxiong		
2018	Everyone Wants To Meet You (谁都渴望遇见你)	Zhang Jingzhong		
2021	The Peculiar Pawnbroker (人心鉴定师)	Cheng Huochang		
2022	I Want to be a Towkay (亲家冤家做头家)	Hou Xili		

=== Variety show hosting ===
Year	Title	Network	Notes	Ref
2021	LNX x Hawkers (星•料理)	Mediacorp Channel 8		

== Awards and nominations ==
Organisation	Year	Category	Nominated work	Result	Ref.
Star Awards	1994	Top 5 Most Popular Male Artistes	—N/a	Won	
Star Awards	1994	Most Popular Male Artiste	—N/a	Won	
Star Awards	1995	Best Actor	Wounded Tracks (as Xu Le)	Won	
Star Awards	1995	Top 10 Most Popular Male Artistes	—N/a	Won	
Star Awards	1996	Best Actor	Somewhere in Time (as Liu Xiong)	Nominated	
Star Awards	1996	Top 10 Most Popular Male Artistes	—N/a	Won	
Star Awards	1997	Best Actor	The Unbeatables II (as Yan Fei)	Nominated	
Star Awards	1997	Top 10 Most Popular Male Artistes	—N/a	Won	
Star Awards	1998	Best Actor	The Adventures Of Wisely (as Zhang Guoqing)	Nominated	
Star Awards	1998	Top 10 Most Popular Male Artistes	—N/a	Won	
Star Awards	1999	Top 10 Most Popular Male Artistes	—N/a	Won	
Star Awards	2000	Best Actor	Coup de Scorpion (as Zheng Nanshen)	Nominated	
Star Awards	2000	Top 10 Most Popular Male Artistes	—N/a	Won	
Star Awards	2001	Best Actor	Dare To Strike (as Wang Shen)	Nominated	
Star Awards	2001	Top 10 Most Popular Male Artistes	—N/a	Won	
Star Awards	2002	Best Actor	The Vagrant (as Bao)	Won	
Star Awards	2002	Top 10 Most Popular Male Artistes	—N/a	Won	
Star Awards	2003	Best Actor	The Unbeatables III (as Yan Fei)	Nominated	
Star Awards	2003	Top 10 Most Popular Male Artistes	—N/a	Won	
Star Awards	2004	Best Actor	A Child's Hope II (as Hu Yiming)	Nominated	
Star Awards	2004	All-Time Favourite Artiste	—N/a	Won	
Star Awards	2006	Best Actor	The Undisclosed (as Cheng Musheng)	Won	
Star Awards	2012	Favourite Onscreen Couple (with Fann Wong)	On the Fringe (as Tian Yibang)	Nominated	
Star Awards	2014	Favourite Onscreen Couple (with Rui En)	C.L.I.F. 2 (as Wei Lantian)	Nominated	
Star Awards	2014	Star Awards for Most Popular Regional Artiste (China)	—N/a	Nominated	
Star Awards	2014	Star Awards for Most Popular Regional Artiste (Malaysia)	—N/a	Nominated	
Star Awards	2014	Star Awards for Most Popular Regional Artiste (Indonesia)	—N/a	Nominated	
Star Awards	2014	Star Awards for Most Popular Regional Artiste (Cambodia)	—N/a	Nominated	
