= Zoe Tay =

Singaporean actress (born 1968)

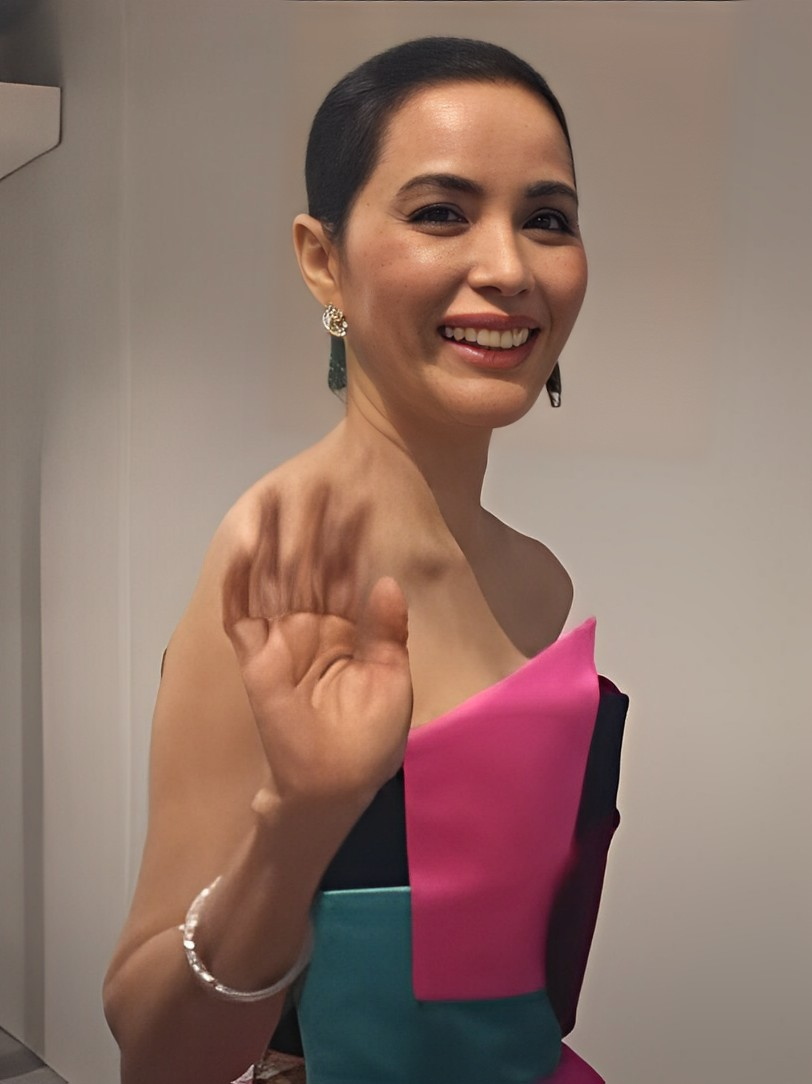
- Tay in 2017
- Born: 10 January 1968 (age 58); Singapore
- Education: Kay Hua Primary School; Yuan Ching Secondary School
- Alma mater: Baharuddin Vocational Institute
- Occupations: Actress; singer; host; model
- Years active: 1988–present
- Spouse: Philip Chionh (m. 2001)
- Children: 3
- Awards: Full list
- Musical career
- Genre: Mandopop
- Instrument: Vocals

Chinese name
- Traditional Chinese: 鄭惠玉
- Simplified Chinese: 郑惠玉
- Hanyu Pinyin: Zhèng Huìyù
- Jyutping: Zeng6 Wai6 Juk6
- Tâi-lô: Tēnn Huī-gio̍k

Zoe Tay Hui Gek (born 10 January 1968) is a Singaporean actress and former model. She has been referred to as the "Queen of Caldecott Hill" and "Ah Jie".

Tay has received four Star Awards for Best Actress. Tay holds the record for the most nominations for the Star Awards for Best Actress, with 15 nominations. She also shares the record for the most consecutive nominations in the category, having received seven consecutive nominations from 1995 to 2001 alongside Fann Wong and Rui En.

== Early life ==
Tay is the sixth of seven children born to Teochew parents. She was three when her biological mother died in an accident. Her father remarried and had a daughter with Wong Pong Chin. Her father worked at a chicken and pig farm in Lim Chu Kang while her stepmother was a housewife. Tay attended Kay Hua Primary School and later, Yuan Ching Secondary School, where she completed her O-level examinations. She studied fashion design at the Baharuddin Vocational Institute.

When she was 13, she thought of using "Jenny" as her English name as people pronounced her hanyu pinyin surname Zheng as "Jenny". However her siblings didn't like it. She later found the name "Zoe" in a dictionary.

== Career ==
As a teenager, Tay was her brothers' date when they had to bring a girl to school events and was told by her brothers to be more ladylike. She then attended an etiquette course which the organisers had also newly opened a modelling agency which then hired her. Tay then started out as a model at the age of 16. In 1987, she was named Model of The Year.

In 1988, Tay joined the inaugural Star Search, a reality talent search television show, by Singapore Broadcasting Corporation (SBC) to gain greater public exposure to launch her modelling career in Hong Kong or Japan. She would win the competition and was offered a three-year contract with SBC. While Tay had initially disliked acting, she began feeling passionate for her craft after her role in Crime and Passion in 1991. Her breakthrough performance as a materialistic young woman in Pretty Faces catapulted her into stardom. Her popularity was affirmed with a Top 10 Most Popular Female Artiste Award at the Star Awards every year for ten consecutive years since its inception in 1994. In 1996, Zoe won the Best Actress award for her role in The Golden Pillow at the annual Star Awards. In 2004, she was the first actress to have been awarded the All-Time Favourite Artiste. Zoe was the first female artiste to launch a coffee table book titled "Zoe's Coffee Table", commissioned by Mediacorp.

Other than television series, Tay also forayed into films. In 2010, she starred opposite Hong Kong actor Kenny Ho in Love Cuts, playing the role of a terminally ill woman who has breast cancer. In 2013, she appeared in her first fully English-speaking role in Mister John with Irish star Aidan Gillen.

Tay has collaborated with many artistes in her various projects. Her on-screen chemistry with Li Nanxing in The Unbeatables series and other serials has put them in the list of the Top 5 Best Onscreen Couples at the Star Awards 25th Drama Anniversary show. In 2015, she collaborated for the first time with Huang Biren, in The Dream Makers II.

Due to her contributions to the television industry in Singapore, a wax figurine was modelled after her by Madame Tussauds Singapore, and has been on display in the museum since 2014.

Tay won her second Best Actress at the Star Awards 2017 for You Can Be an Angel 2, 21 years after her first.

At the Star Awards 2021, Tay won her fourth Best Actress award for the drama, My Guardian Angels, becoming the first actress to win two consecutive Best Actress awards.

== Personal life ==
Tay is married to Philip Chionh, a former Republic of Singapore Air Force pilot. They were engaged in 1995 at the peak of her career, and held their wedding ceremony in 2001 at a church wedding and western-styled dinner at Ritz Carlton Hotel. They have three sons together.

Known for her charitable persona, Tay is a regular performer at various charity shows. Tay is also an avid dog lover and has adopted and fostered several rescue dogs, Tong Tong, Snowball and Pepper.

== Filmography ==
=== Television series ===
Year	Title	Role	Ref.
1988	My Fair Ladies (窈窕淑女)	Fu Guihua	
1988	Strange Encounters II (奇缘之怨偶天成)	Zhu Xiujuan / Jia	
1989	Patrol (铁警雄风)	Lin Biqing	
1989	A Mother's Love (亲心唤我心)	Fang Yining	
1990	Finishing Line (出人头地)	Ye Bei	
1990	Navy (壮志豪情)	Jiang Shuna	
1991	The Last Swordsman (最后一个大侠)	Hong Xiu	
1991	Pretty Faces (三面夏娃)	Bobo	
1992	Ladies in Action (霹雳红唇)	Ni Jie	
1992	Crime and Passion (执法先锋)	Wen Daijin	
1992	Terms of Endearment (戏剧人生)	Shu Qing	
1993	Angel of Vengeance (暴雨狂花)	Cai Yiling	
1993	Ride The Waves (卿本佳人)	Fang Xiaoting	
1993	The Unbeatables I	Luo Qifang (Long Jiajia)	
1993	Happy Foes (欢喜冤家)	Zhang Shuimei	
1994	Thunder Plot (惊天大阴谋)	Le Shan	
1994	Truly Yours (聪明糊涂心)	Qi Meihua	
1994	Shadow in the Dark (一号凶宅)	Li Shali / Li Qing	
1995	The Teochew Family	Cai Chongmei (Cai Meina)	
1995	The Golden Pillow	Zhou Xiaodan	
1996	A Different Life (妈姐情缘)	Ou Guikai	
1996	The Unbeatables II	Luo Qifang (Huang Yuefang)	
1997	My Wife, Your Wife, Their Wives 101 (老婆之老婆柠檬茶)	Yang Jing	
1997	Love in A Foreign City (富贵双城)	Yu Shuting	
1997	Rising Expectations (长河)	Yu Jiahui	
1998	Return of the Condor Heroes	Lu Erniang	
1998	The New Adventures of Wisely	Bai Su	
1999	Lost Soul (另类佳人)	Pianpian	
1999	The Millennium Bug (千年虫)	Huang Sijie	
2000	My Home Affairs (家事)	Zhang Xiaotong	
2001	The Stratagem (世纪攻略)	Ye Kaishuang	
2001	The Hotel	Biyu	
2002	Katong Miss Oh (加东Miss Oh)	Miss Oh	
2002	The Unbeatables III	Luo Qifang / Long Jiajia / Huang Yuefang	
2003	Phua Chu Kang Pte Ltd Season 5	Ting Ting	
2003	Baby Boom	Kim	
2004	Man at Forty	Jian Jie	
2004	My Mighty-in-Laws	Yao Meimei	
2006	Lady of Leisure (闲妻靓母)	Yue Liang	
2006	A Million Treasures	Bai Xing Xing	
2008	La Femme	Fang Baoyu	
2008	By My Side	Lin Xinya	
2009	The Ultimatum	Ye Yuchen	
2011	Devotion	Liu Zhaodi	
2012	Double Bonus	Li Meifeng	
2013	The Dream Makers	Zhou Weiyun	
2013	Recipe (回味)	Qiu Yun	
2015	You Can Be an Angel Too	Wang Ruojun	
2015	The Dream Makers II	Zhou Weiyun	
2016	Eat Already?	Doctor Tay	
2016	You Can Be an Angel 2	Wang Ruojun	
2016	Hero	Deborah	
2017	While We Are Young	Fang Ting	
2018	A Million Dollar Dream	Hu Jiaofen	
2018	VIC	Zoe	
2018	You Can Be an Angel 3 (你也可以是天使3)	Wang Ruojun	
2019	How Are You?	Dr. Michelle Soong	
2019	All Is Well (你那边怎样，我这边OK)	Zhang Bizhu	
2020	My Guardian Angels	Mandy See	
2021	The Heartland Hero	Tai Le	
2022	You Can Be an Angel 4 (你也可以是天使4)	Wang Ruojun	
2022	Dark Angel (黑天使)	He Ziyuan	
2023	My One and Only	Ma Limin	
2025	Emerald Hill - The Little Nyonya Story	Liu Xiu Niang	

=== Film ===
Year	Title	Role	Notes	Ref.
1994	Love Dowry (爱情定金)	Min	Telemovie	
1995	Love Knows No Bounds (甜甜屋)	Xiu Hui	Telemovie	
1996	Pointed Triangle (杀之恋)	Shi Jia	Telemovie	
1997	The Scoop (迷情专访)	Joey	Telemovie	
1999	Liang Po Po: The Movie	Herself		
2001	The Tree	Guo Meifeng		
2010	Love Cuts	Sissy		
2013	Mister John	Kim Devine		
2013	Love ... and Other Bad Habits	Mei		

=== Show hosting ===
Tay has hosted the following programmes:

Year	Title	Notes	Ref.
2001	With Heart And Soul – Cambodia Trip (真心真意携手同行－柬埔寨之旅)		
2002	Journey Across Mongolia (真心真意蒙古之行)		
2002	Health Matters (一切由慎开始)		
2002	LNY All Stars Variety (歌舞欢腾迎新喜2002)		
2002	Travel Hunt – India (奇趣搜搜搜－印度之旅)		
2003	Journey Across Lesotho (真心真意—莱索托之旅)		
2003	Wonders of the World (惠眼看世界)		
2003	Health Matters II (一切由慎开始II)		
2004	Zoe's Mommy Tips (阿姐有喜了)		
2004	Wonders of the World II (惠眼看世界II)		
2004	Chronicles of Life (我爱我家之真情实录)		
2005	Zoe's Treasure Trove (阿姐有个宝)		
2013	Ladies Nite (女人聚乐部)		
2018	Away with My BFF (老友出走记)		
2023	The Zoe and Liang Show (惠眼说亮话)		

== Discography ==
=== Studio albums ===
Year	English title	Mandarin title
1998	Zoe Tay	十分郑惠玉

=== Compilation albums ===
Year	English title	Mandarin title
2012	MediaCorp Music Lunar New Year Album 12	新传媒群星金龙接财神
2013	MediaCorp Music Lunar New Year Album 13	群星贺岁金蛇献祥和
2015	MediaCorp Music Lunar New Year Album 15	新传媒群星金羊添吉祥
2016	MediaCorp Music Lunar New Year Album 16	新传媒群星金猴添喜庆
2017	MediaCorp Music Lunar New Year Album 17	新传媒群星咕鸡咕鸡庆丰年
2018	MediaCorp Music Lunar New Year Album 18	新传媒群星阿狗狗过好年
2019	MediaCorp Music Lunar New Year Album 19	新传媒群星猪饱饱欢乐迎肥年
2020	MediaCorp Music Lunar New Year Album 20	裕鼠鼠纳福迎春了
2021	MediaCorp Music Lunar New Year Album 21	福满牛年Moo Moo乐

== Awards and nominations ==
Year	Ceremony	Category	Nominated work	Result	Ref
1994	Star Awards	Top 5 Most Popular Female Artistes	—N/a	Won	
1994	Star Awards	Most Popular Female Artiste	—N/a	Won	
1995	Star Awards	Best Actress	Love Dowry	Nominated	
1995	Star Awards	Most Popular Female Artiste	—N/a	Won	
1995	Star Awards	Top 5 Most Popular Female Artistes	—N/a	Won	
1996	Star Awards	Best Actress	The Golden Pillow	Won	
1996	Star Awards	Top 5 Most Popular Female Artistes	—N/a	Won	
1997	Star Awards	Best Actress	A Different Life	Nominated	
1997	Star Awards	Best Theme Song	The Unbeatables II	Nominated	
1997	Star Awards	Top 10 Most Popular Female Artistes	—N/a	Won	
1998	Star Awards	Best Actress	The New Adventures of Wisely	Nominated	
1998	Star Awards	Special Achievement Award	—N/a	Won	
1998	Star Awards	Top 10 Most Popular Female Artistes	—N/a	Won	
1999	Star Awards	Best Actress	Lost Souls	Nominated	
1999	Star Awards	Best Theme Song	Lost Souls	Nominated	
1999	Star Awards	Top 10 Most Popular Female Artistes	—N/a	Won	
2000	Star Awards	Best Actress	My Home Affairs	Nominated	
2000	Star Awards	Top 10 Most Popular Female Artistes	—N/a	Won	
2000	Asian Television Awards	Best Actress in a Leading Role	My Home Affairs	Nominated	
2001	Star Awards	Best Actress	The Strategem	Nominated	
2001	Star Awards	Top 10 Most Popular Female Artistes	—N/a	Won	
2002	Star Awards	Top 10 Most Popular Female Artistes	—N/a	Won	
2003	Star Awards	Best Actress	Baby Boom	Nominated	
2003	Star Awards	Top 10 Most Popular Female Artistes	—N/a	Won	
2004	Star Awards	All-Time Favourite Artiste	—N/a	Won	
2010	Asian Television Awards	Best Actress in a Leading Role	The Ultimatum	Nominated	
2012	Star Awards	Best Actress	Devotion	Nominated	
2014	Star Awards	Favourite Female Character	The Dream Makers	Nominated	
2014	Star Awards	Star Awards for Most Popular Regional Artiste (China)	—N/a	Nominated	
2014	Star Awards	Star Awards for Most Popular Regional Artiste (Malaysia)	—N/a	Nominated	
2014	Star Awards	Star Awards for Most Popular Regional Artiste (Indonesia)	—N/a	Nominated	
2014	Star Awards	Star Awards for Most Popular Regional Artiste (Cambodia)	—N/a	Nominated	
2015	Star Awards	Star Awards for Most Popular Regional Artiste (China)	—N/a	Nominated	
2015	Star Awards	Star Awards for Most Popular Regional Artiste (Indonesia)	—N/a	Nominated	
2015	Star Awards	Star Awards for Most Popular Regional Artiste (Cambodia)	—N/a	Nominated	
2016	Star Awards	Best Actress	The Dream Makers II	Nominated	
2016	Star Awards	Toggle Celebrity BFF Award	—N/a	Nominated	
2017	Star Awards	Best Actress	You Can Be an Angel 2	Won	
2017	Asian Television Awards	Best Actress in a Leading Role	You Can Be an Angel 2	Nominated	
2018	Star Awards	Best Actress	While We Are Young	Nominated	
2019	Star Awards	Best Actress	A Million Dollar Dream	Won	
2021	Star Awards	Best Actress	My Guardian Angels	Won	
2023	Star Awards	Best Actress	Dark Angel	Nominated	
