= The Unbeatables I =

- 双天至尊
- Genre: Gambling
- Created by: Li Yanping (李艳萍）
- Starring: Li Nanxing; Zoe Tay; Chen Shucheng; Zhu Houren
- Opening theme: 《沉默的羔羊》 by Chao Chuan (赵传)
- Ending theme: 《爱要怎么说出口》 by Chao Chuan (赵传)
- Country of origin: Singapore
- No. of episodes: 20

Production
- Executive producer: Lau Tin Fook (刘天富）
- Running time: 60 minutes

Original release
- Network: SBC 8
- Release: 4 November – 1 December 1993

Related
- The Unbeatables II; The Unbeatables III

The Unbeatables I (双天至尊I) is a Singaporean drama series that was made by Singapore Broadcasting Corporation's (SBC) Channel 8. The popularity of the series led to the production of 2 follow-ups, The Unbeatables II and The Unbeatables III.

== Cast ==
- Li Nanxing as Yan Fei/Lin Jianfei
- Zoe Tay as Luo Qifang/Long Jiajia
- Zhu Houren as Long Tingguang
- Chen Shucheng as Yan Kun
- Cassandra See as Luo Wenxin
- Lin Yisheng as He Xiangnan
- Liang Weidong as Cai Haijie
- Hong Huifang as Qiu Huaifeng
- Richard Low as Qiu Dingtian

== Synopsis ==
King of Gamblers, Yan Kun and King of Deception, Long Tingguang, both set their eyes on Coral Island - an undeveloped empty island- for their future casino landmark. Through underhanded methods, Long wins the gambling match with Yan and thus acquires the rights to the island. Yan is then forced to blind his own eyes, while his wife is made to commit suicide, leaving Yan's five-year-old son an orphan.

18 years later, Yan's son has grown up as Lin Jianfei. His happy-go-lucky attitude is a cover for his ultimate goal: to avenge his parents' misfortunes. His gambling skills draws the attention of Long's enemy, Qiu Huaifeng. She hires Lin to work for her family's casino and Lin uses this opportunity to perfect his gambling skills.

Later, Lin and his friend, Xiangnan, are mistakenly arrested for illegal gambling by policewoman, Luo Qifang. Qifang and her sister, Wenxin, both turn out to be Lin's neighbour. Over time, the bickering pair become romantically involved, and Lin reveals his true identity as Yan Fei, the son of the King of Gamblers.

Just as the young couple's relationship blooms, Qifang discovers that she is actually Long Jiajia - the long lost daughter and the only surviving child of Long, Yan Fei's arch enemy.

== Production ==
A Singapore card expert, Robin Chew, was engaged to teach the cast card tricks. SBC also engaged Jiang Dou Hai, who directed gambling stunts in Hong Kong gambling films, to teach the cast for two months.

One of the few Singapore series (inclusive of the sequels) with gambling theme and the only one during the 1990s.

== Accolades ==
Year	Ceremony	Award	Nominee	Result	Ref
1994	Star Awards	Most Popular Drama Serial Award	—N/a	Won	

Preceded by Award established	Star Awards for Best Drama Serial; The Unbeatables (season 1); 1994	Succeeded by Chronicle of Life; 1995
