= Chen Xiuhuan =

Singaporean actress (born 1965)

- Born: 10 October 1965 (age 60); Singapore
- Other name: Sherry Tan
- Occupation: Actress
- Years active: 1984–1997; 2018–present
- Spouse: Fred Tsai (m. 1997)
- Children: 3

Chinese name
- Traditional Chinese: 陳秀環
- Simplified Chinese: 陈秀环
- Hanyu Pinyin: Chén Xiùhuán

Chen Xiuhuan (born 10 October 1965), also known as Sherry Tan, is a Singaporean actress. She is a Mediacorp artiste from 1984 to 1997, and from 2018 till present.

== Career ==
Chen started her acting career at the age of 18 after attending the Singapore Broadcasting Corporation's drama training course. Her role in the fantasy drama Star Maiden, starring opposite Wang Yuqing, propelled her to stardom in 1988.

Chen quit her acting career in 1997 for marriage. She opened a bridal shop subsequently.

In 2005, Chen briefly returned to television in A Promise for Tomorrow. She has also appeared in several children's programmes.

Chen made a comeback in 2018 by playing as a wife to Chew Chor Meng since 20+ years since they last acted together in the drama Fifty & Fabulous. In 2018, she was cast in the drama series Gifted, The Distance Between and Heart to Heart.

== Personal life ==
Chen married Fred Tsai Yi-peng, a Taiwanese businessman, in 1997.

After she had children, she never spoke to them about her former career. In fact, her three daughters almost never watch TV. When they were younger, they were banned from switching on the goggle box - "not even for cartoons", says Shanisse - and the rare times that they did get to watch TV, they tuned in to documentaries. Ms Tan, a self-professed tiger mum, says in Mandarin: "I was strict about that because I wanted them to watch only really good, educational programmes. "To them, I'm just their mother, not any sort of celebrity mum. So when people recognised me on the streets and called out my name, they used to be very puzzled and asked if those strangers were my friends.

== Filmography ==
=== Film ===
Year	Title	Role	Notes	Ref.
2017	Lucky Boy	Wu Zhi		
2017	Ah Boys to Men 4	LTA Zhang Xin Yi's Mother		
2018	Zombiepura			

=== Television series ===
Year	Title	Role	Notes	Ref.
1984	Youth (年轻人 之《三人行》)	Li Yan		
1984	The Awakening 2 (雾锁南洋II 之《赤道朝阳》)	Huang Huizhong		
1984	Growing Up (吾家有子)			
1985	Tycoon (豪门内外)			
1985	The Unyielding Butterflies (铁蝴蝶)	Student	Cameo	
1985	Son of Pulau Tekong (亚答籽)	He Weina		
1985	Home is where Love is (吾爱吾家)			
1986	The Happy Trio (青春123)			
1986	Under One Roof (家和万事兴)	Hong Laiyu		
1986	The Sword and the Song	Queen Zhou the Elder		
1987	Neighbours (芝麻绿豆)			
1987	Moving On (变迁)	Zhuo Hui	Cameo	
1988	Star Maiden (飞越银河)	Yi Di		
1988	Airforce (空军)	Chris		
1988	The Golden Quest (金麒麟)	Lu Huiniang		
1988	Mystery (迷离夜 之《美》)	Lü Hong/ Gao Meimei		
1988	Strange Encounters 2 (奇缘2 之《钟馗再捉鬼》)	Jia Yunchang		
1989	Magic of Dance (鼓舞青春)			
1989	Turn of the Tide (浮沉)	Jiang Huiyun		
1990	Starting Over (暖流)	Fang Jianan		
1990	Journey's End (生命街车)	Shang Manhua		
1990	The Winning Team (飞跃巅峰)	Fang Mei		
1991	Black Phoenix (黑凤凰)	Ye Lifang	Cameo	
1991	Guardian Angel (爸爸怕怕)	Fang Yiren		
1992	A Time to Dance (火舞风云)	Chen Lichang		
1993	Heavenly Beings (再战封神榜)	Li Xuejun		
1993	The Witty Advisor (金牌师爷)	Yuan Qianqian		
1993	Web of Deceit (鹤啸九天)	Xiao Xiang		
1994	Lethal Duo (天使追辑令)	Yu Li		
1994	The Young Ones (壮志骄阳)	Hong Ying		
1994	Veil Of Darkness (历劫浮生)		Telemovie	
1995	Neighbourhood Heroes (大英雄小人物)	He Xinhui		
1995	Secret Files (机密档案)	Bai Xueqi		
1995	Lady Investigators (女探三人组)	Gao Meizhi		
2004	Oh Dad (偶像爸爸)	Feng Meichuan		
2005	Destiny (梦在手里)	Yao Siqi's Mother		
2005	A Promise for Tomorrow (拥抱明天)	Huang Huiyin		
2018	Fifty & Fabulous (五零高手)	Zhu Li		
2018	Gifted (天之骄子)	Luo Yali		
2018	The Distance Between (下个路口遇见你)	Nie Xiaoling		
2018	Heart To Heart (心点心)	Lu Lu		
2022	Sunny Side Up	Nelly Heng		

== Awards and nominations ==
Year	Ceremony	Award	Result	Ref
1994	Star Awards	Top 10 Most Popular Female Artistes	Won	
2019	Star Awards	Top 10 Most Popular Female Artistes	Won	
