= Star Idol =

Singaporean television series

Star Idol (Chinese: 明星偶像) was a Singaporean televised acting competition held in 2005 and aired on MediaCorp TV Channel 8. The competition was first announced through the Internet on 11 August 2005, and elimination rounds commenced on 2 November of the same year. The programme aired weekly on Wednesdays at 8:00pm and ended with a two-hour grand final on 19 March 2006.

== Background ==
When the official announcement for Star Idol was made via Internet, an article posted asked for suggestions of the mascot. It was later decided that a large red gorilla that resembled King Kong would become the official mascot for Star Idol.

== Selection process ==
=== Auditions ===
To be eligible for Star Idol, contestants must be either a Singaporean citizen or permanent resident and belong to the age range of 16 and 35. There was no specification for race, although fluency in the Chinese language is required due to the competition being Chinese-based. Auditions were held on 3 September 2005. Participants had to memorize dialogues from five scripts given, one of which would be randomly chosen by the panel of judges to be performed during the actual audition. Registration for the competition required a fee of S$10, which was paid on the day of the audition itself. An estimated total of 2,000 people auditioned for Star Idol.

Roughly 500 people from the auditions made the cut and became part of the callbacks. The number of contestants was filtered down by a series of eliminations until only 10 male and female semi-finalists remained to compete in the quarter-finals.

=== Quarter-finals ===
The quarter-finals saw the pairing up of one male and one female contestant. An ever-changing panel of judges would comment after an acting performance by each pair. However, the fates of the contestants were decided by public voting. Each week, one male and one female contestant is eliminated until 4 of each remain. The final 8 would proceed to the semi-finals of the competition.

- Top 10 Female Quarter-finalists
  - Alicia Neo
  - Cheryl Ng
  - Kate Ong
  - Jacqueline Sue
  - Joey Tan
  - Leann Koh Bee Khee
  - Lilian Lai
  - Quek Siow Wei
  - Tan Ming Chieh
  - Tan Yan
- Top 10 Male Quarter-finalists
  - Albert See
  - Bryan Wang
  - Garrett Lim
  - Kang Cheng Xi
  - Koh Ben Hui
  - Leo Lam
  - Lincoln Khoo
  - Terence Tan
  - William Lawandi
  - Zhao Zhi Rong

=== Semi-finals ===
Alicia Neo, Jacqueline Sue, Leann Koh, Lilian Lai, Bryan Wang, Kang Cheng Xi, Lincoln Khoo and Leo Lam became the eight Semi-finalists of Star Idol and had to compete in an interactive television drama titled Who Is It?. Episodes of Who Is It? were pre-recorded and aired every Wednesday at 8:00pm. The only shows recorded live were through the results shows at 10:30pm, with the exception of the episode on 22 February 2006. It was pre-recorded and aired at 11:30pm due to the airing of the eulogy of former Singapore Deputy Prime Minister Sinnathamby Rajaratnam at 10:30pm, who died earlier that day.

Each episode of Who Is It? ends with a cliffhanger with an anonymous scream, indicating a character has gone missing. The contestant with the fewest votes is eliminated from Star Idol and is identified in the next episode of the interactive drama as the character who goes missing. Who Is It? also featured veteran actors San Yow, Ann Kok and Thomas Ong.

Lilian Lai is the first contestant to leave after garnering the fewest among votes at the end of the first episode. Subsequently, Wang, Koh and Khoo were eliminated. An episode featured the four eliminated contestants where they were chased by an assassin to the sea shore of a remote island and managed to find a raft. The raft can only accommodate two people and only one of the four contestants can escape from the island with the main character of the drama. The rescued contestant was indicated to be allow to return to the competition after being rescued. Wang was revived back into the competition.

Kang Cheng Xi was the last to be eliminated during the semi-finals with Wang and Lam surviving the semi-finals.

=== Finals ===
The judging process of the finals differs from the semi-finals. The original production was replaced by a drama consisting of three acting segments that depicted Wang and Lam competing to become an actor.

Julian Hee, Adam Chen, Zheng Geping and Felicia Chin acted in the drama also.

The judges unanimously chose Wang as the winner but the winner is fully decided by the voting public. Wang was announced winner of Star Idol, who had garnered 61% of the total votes. He won himself a 2-year contract with Mediacorp.

== Criticism ==
Star Idol was an acting competition, with format similar to singing competitions like Singapore Idol and Project Superstar, where the winner was determined by public voting instead of professional judging.

The interactive drama Who Is It? was criticised for its unrealistic and distracted nature. The ever-changing and unpredictable script of the drama also caused several storyline flaws and loopholes. Jacqueline drugged and attempted to rape Cheng Xi prior to her character "disappearing" from the television show. However, neither Cheng Xi nor her existing girlfriend Alicia were deemed suspects. Inspector Zhu played a completely innocent person and was seen investigating the cases even when he was alone and did not need to pretend. However, he was conclusively revealed as the ultimate villain of the show. It is justifiable that he was neurotic.

== Post-Star Idol careers ==
Only winner Bryan Wang and second-runner up Kang Cheng Xi were offered contracts with Mediacorp. Bryan's first role was playing Shu Tang in An Enchanted Life. Kang's first role was the second male lead after Li Nan Xing as Ma Lu in A Million Treasures. Other contestants like Lincoln, Alicia and Leann have appeared in minor roles or cameos that appear for less than a minute. Examples are Lincoln being a gangster. Leann has a larger role and plays Ma Lu's (Cheng Xi) first love interest who cheats on him. Jacqueline was offered a supporting role as Ah Lian, Joanne Peh's best friend, in Like Father Like Daughter, for which she received a Best Supporting Actress Star Awards nomination.

== Incident ==
After the auditions for Star Idol are over and before the Top 20 had been announced, handwritten posters were posted at bus stops along Upper Thomson Road and Andrew Road where Mediacorp was located. The posters claimed Mediacorp were "unfair and cruel" to contestants and one poster claiming that some of the original Top 20 contestants were replaced after selection. An online forum post also claimed several contestants were accepted and later disqualified as they were not new to the media scene. Mediacorp had lodged police report against the posters.
