= Republic of Food =

2018 Singaporean film

- Theatrical release poster
- Traditional Chinese: 食勿共和國
- Simplified Chinese: 食勿共和国
- Hanyu Pinyin: Shí wù gòng hé guó
- Directed by: Kelvin Tong
- Screenplay by: Kelvin Tong; Ken Kwek
- Produced by: Leon Tong; Kat Goh
- Starring: Adrian Pang; Yeo Yann Yann; Jeffrey Xu; Patricia Mok; Shane Mardjuki; Alexandra Tan; Bobby Tonelli; KF Seetoh
- Cinematography: Michael Zaw
- Edited by: Tammy Quah
- Music by: Joe Ng; Ting Si Hao
- Production company: Boku Films
- Distributed by: Cathay-Keris Films
- Release date: 16 August 2018
- Running time: 100 minutes
- Country: Singapore
- Languages: English; Mandarin; Malay

Republic of Food is a 2018 Singaporean dystopian comedy-drama film directed by Kelvin Tong, starring Adrian Pang, Yeo Yann Yann, Jeffrey Xu, Patricia Mok, Shane Mardjuki, Alexandra Tan, Bobby Tonelli and KF Seetoh. Supported by the Ministry of Communications and Information (MCI), the film was released at selected Cathay Cineplexes cinemas on 16 August 2018. The film was subsequently re-edited into a six-episode web series and is available for streaming on Viddsee.

== Synopsis ==
In the near future where a virus has forced a global ban on the consumption of all food products, a television host named Chia Kau Peng joins the Underground Food Club (UFC) which comprises a group of people who desire the taste of food cooked using real ingredients.

== Cast ==
- Adrian Pang as Chia Kau Peng
- Yeo Yann Yann as Virginia Goh
- Jeffrey Xu as Zhang Yimao
- Patricia Mok as Meimei
- Shane Mardjuki as Haris
- Alexandra Tan as Xiao Ling
- Bobby Tonelli as Rad Ruben
- KF Seetoh as Zito Seetoh
- Oon Shu An as Miss Mo
- Patrick Teoh as Old Chia
- Silvarajoo Prakasam as Mr. Rajan
- Regina Lim as Yimao's girlfriend
