= The Quarters (TV series) =

- 猪仔馆人家
- Genre: Period drama
- Written by: Koh Teng Liang
- Starring: Dai Xiangyu; Zhou Ying; Constance Song; Yao Wenlong; Zen Chong; Moo Yan Yee
- Opening theme: 故事 by Cheryl Wee (无言是爱 By Wei En )
- Ending theme: 戏说从头 by Wei En
- Countries of origin: Malaysia; Singapore
- Original language: Mandarin
- No. of episodes: 30 (list of episodes)

Production
- Producers: Yeo Saik Pin; Kok Tzyy Haw

Original release
- Network: ntv7 (Malaysia); Mediacorp Channel 8 (Singapore)
- Release: 3 September – 12 October 2012

Related
- Destiny In Her Hands; Justice In The City

The Quarters (猪仔馆人家) is the fifth Malaysian production by MediaCorp Studios Malaysia. Filming began in September 2011 and took place in Muar, Johor, Malaysia and its rural surroundings. It is shown on weekdays at 7pm. It debuted in Singapore on 3 September 2012.

The series is set during an era of samsui women, opium dens, pulled rickshaws and the laid back "kampung" lifestyle. It was also a time when waves of migrant workers and coolies from China settled in Singapore. Many of them were housed in large buildings such that as depicted by Zhu Zai House and multiple tenants would occupy a single room usually meant for one or two persons.

== Synopsis ==
Set during the 1950s, the story revolves around the lives of the tenants living in an old building called No.8 "Zhu Zai House" (八号猪仔馆), which was left behind by Bai Duchang to his three grandsons Jinchuan, Jinfeng and Jinhai. They share the large building with a number of tenants. Most are labourers and unskilled workers while a few such as Jinhai and his friend Luo Hanguo have had any sort of "book learning". As labourers and workers these tenants rarely have any free time so they make the most of it by sitting around to chat and gossip or play mahjong together. Hence they form a tightly-knit community.

Bai Duchang, whose name literally means "pomfret", is an irascible old man who came from a wealthy family whose fortunes took a downturn. His family has some bad history in the town and the temperamental Bai Duchang is unpopular with townsfolk. He dotes on the mentally handicapped Jinchuan and often scolds the sensible Jinhai for no reason at all. The naive Jinchuan is often the subject of mockery by some villagers due to his supposed low IQ. In reality, this was due to brain damage from the abuse he suffered at the hands of Japanese soldiers during the Japanese Occupation. His favouritism towards Jinchuan infuriated Jinchuan's rebellious second brother Jinfeng, who moved out and rarely visits.

On the other hand, the good-natured Jinhai is well-liked by his neighbours and he would often tell them stories and folktales. He often ends up taking the backlash from villagers offended by his grandfather and finds himself in sandwiched in between his grandfather and estranged brother Jinfeng. During off-time, he finds solace in hanging out with his bosom friends Luo Hanguo and Liu Tianshui. The stingy Hanguo is one of the few residents who had some education and holds a white-collar job. The straight-talking Tianshui is a manual labourer and the least educated of the trio but is fiercely loyal to his friends.

In another side of town, the widowed Guan Chunlong has a pawn shop business. The Guans are much more Westernised than most villagers and extremely wealthy. His daughter Naidong has returned from university overseas for the holidays. As headstrong as she is pretty, Naidong detests her father for choosing a much younger woman and one who coincidentally was her old enemy in primary school. By chance, she meets Jinhai and later finds her way to Zhu Zai House. Inevitably, the two worlds collide and meet.

Unfortunately, disaster hits Zhu Zai House's inhabitants. Bai Duchang forced Jinfeng to give up his girlfriend to be married to Jinchuan but the grief-stricken bride committed suicide in their wedding chambers before the marriage was consummated. Later, Jinfeng gambled away his money and even lost Zhu Zai House's title deed in a bet. His creditors demand payment and threaten to sell off Zhu Zai House and evict its tenants. Shortly after, Bai Duchang died in his sleep and entrusted Zhu Zai House to a distraught Jinhai. Zhu Zai House is thrown into chaos. An olden phrase sheds light on kinship - blood is thicker than water. Can the bonds of family and common ancestry truly withstand the test of time?

== Cast ==
=== Bai family ===
Actor	Character	Description
Yap Chin Fong	Bai Duchang 白肚鲳	Owner of Zhu Zai House
Yao Wenlong	Bai Jinchuan 白金川 (神经刀 "Crazy Knife")	Oldest grandson Jinchun's husband
Constance Song	Spring Shi Jinchun 石锦春 (十三幺 "Thirteen Wonders")	Fangyuan's ex-girlfriend Jinchuan's wife
Chen Guichuan	Bai Jinfeng 白金峰	Second oldest
Dai Xiangyu	Bai Jinhai 白金海 (咕哩仔 "Coolie Boy")	Youngest; Naidong's ex-boyfriend Qiumei's husband

=== Other tenants ===
Actor	Character	Description
Zen Chong	Luo Hanguo 罗翰国 (罗汉果 "Monkfruit")	Works as a clerk Bai Jinhai and Liu Tianshui's best friend Shanzha's husband
Josh Lai	Liu Tianshui 刘天水 (剃头仔 "Botak")	A coolie Bai Jinhai and Luo Hanguo's best friend
Zhou Ying	Huang Qiumei 黄秋妹 (打石妹 "Quarry Girl")	A samsui woman Jinhai's wife
Tiffany Leong	Mao Dawan 毛大碗 (龅牙婆 "Bucktooth")	A samsui woman Relative of Qiumei; Chicken King's girlfriend
Ling Tang	"Washing Aunty" 洗衣嫂	A tenant
Candy Lim	"Persian Cat" 波斯猫	A tenant

=== Other cast ===
Actor	Character	Description
Moo Yan Yee	Guan Naidong 关耐冬 (消叮咚 "Crazy Dong")	Jinhai's ex-girlfriend
Ling Xiao	Guan Chunlong 关春龙 (棺材脸 "Coffin Face")	Guan Naidong's father Boss of a pawn shop Hualing's husband
Pamelyn Chee	Tao Hualing 陶华玲 (桃花眼 "Flirty Eyes")	Guan Chunlong's wife
Zhang Xinxiang	Chicken King 阉鸡王	Butcher
Wang Zhaoming	Uncle Shi 石三公	Jinchun's father Geomancer

== Notes ==
- Night Market Life was planned to broadcast every night after Journey to the West ended on 30 August 2012. However, the channel wanted to broadcast Malaysian productions first, thus the everyday broadcast of the drama may be brought back or not at all.
- Another co-production The Enchanted was to be broadcast first but The Quarters was moved ahead instead as it was produced first.
- This drama marks Dai Xiangyu's return to Singapore television after almost a year.
- Originally the Chinese title is 猪仔馆 (literally, "Pigsties"), but was changed later on.

== Accolades ==
Actor	Award	Outcome
Wong Lee Chin	Best Music and Sound Design	Nominated
Dai Xiangyu and Zhou Ying	Favourite On-screen Couple	Nominated

== See also ==
- List of programmes broadcast by Mediacorp Channel 8
