= List of Poetic Justice episodes =

Poetic Justice (simplified Chinese: 微笑正仪), is a Singaporean television drama series. It stars Rui En, Dai Yang Tian, Rebecca Lim and Desmond Tan as the main characters in the story. The story revolves around a group of investigative journalists who have very different personalities, but work together to produce the highly popular "Real TV News" program.

It was broadcast on MediaCorp Channel 8 from 11 September 2012 to 8 October 2012. A total of 20 episodes were aired during this period. It will subsequently be aired by Malaysian television channel Astro Shuang Xing from 27 September 2012 to 24 October 2012.

== Episodes ==
No.	Title	Original release date	Rating
1	"Episode One"	September 11, 2012	PG
2	"Episode Two"	September 12, 2012	PG
3	"Episode Three"	September 13, 2012	PG
4	"Episode Four"	September 14, 2012	PG
5	"Episode Five"	September 17, 2012	PG
6	"Episode Six"	September 18, 2012	PG Some Violence
7	"Episode Seven"	September 19, 2012	PG
8	"Episode Eight"	September 20, 2012	PG Some Disturbing Scenes
9	"Episode Nine"	September 21, 2012	PG
10	"Episode Ten"	September 24, 2012	PG
11	"Episode Eleven"	September 25, 2012	PG
12	"Episode Twelve"	September 26, 2012	PG Some Sexual References
13	"Episode Thirteen"	September 27, 2012	PG Some Disturbing Scenes
14	"Episode Fourteen"	September 28, 2012	PG
15	"Episode Fifteen"	October 1, 2012	PG
16	"Episode Sixteen"	October 2, 2012	PG
17	"Episode Seventeen"	October 3, 2012	PG Some Violence
18	"Episode Eighteen"	October 4, 2012	PG Some Violence
19	"Episode Nineteen"	October 5, 2012	PG Some Violence
20	"Episode Twenty"	October 8, 2012	PG Some Violence

== See also ==
- List of programmes broadcast by Mediacorp Channel 8
