= Absolutely Charming =

Singaporean TV series

- 糊里糊涂爱上它
- Genre: Comedy; Fantasy; Love triangles Romance; Idol drama
- Written by: Goh Chwee Chwee 吴翠翠; Chen Siew Khoon 陈秀群
- Directed by: Doreen Yap 叶佩娟; Lei Lai Ling
- Starring: Cherry Hsia; Elvin Ng; Zhou Ying; Zhang Zhenhuan; Rebecca Lim; Richard Low; Patricia Mok
- Opening theme: 爱上 by Matthew Teng
- Ending theme: 味道 by Deng Bi Yuan 糊里糊涂爱上它 by Deng Bi Yuan
- Country of origin: Singapore
- Original language: Chinese
- No. of episodes: 20

Production
- Producer: Leong Lye Lin 梁来玲
- Running time: approx. 45 minutes

Original release
- Network: MediaCorp Channel 8
- Release: 1 May – 28 May 2012

Absolutely Charming (Chinese: 糊里糊涂爱上它) is a Singaporean Chinese fantasy drama which was telecast on Singapore's free-to-air channel, MediaCorp Channel 8. It stars Cherry Hsia, Elvin Ng, Zhou Ying, Zhang Zhenhuan, Rebecca Lim, Richard Low and Patricia Mok.

== Plot ==
Hu Liqin, a Fox Spirit, is banished to Earth for being unable to suppress her feelings of love in heavens. The only way she would be permitted back to the Celestial Court was if she could find a man who is willing to sacrifice his life to love and protect her.

== Cast ==
- Cherry Hsia as Hu Liqin, a fox spirit.
- Elvin Ng as Song Haomin, one of the designers at Foxy
- Zhou Ying as Xie Enlin, one of the designers at Foxy
- Zhang Zhen Huan as Wu Zikang, one of the designers at Foxy
- Rebecca Lim as Song Xinmei, owner of Fragrance Inn
- Richard Low as Song Tiancheng
- Patricia Mok as Liu Bingbing
- Jason Lee Kok Yang as Song Renjie

== Production ==
The drama series was announced in August 2011 with Jeanette Aw and Tay Ping Hui as the main lead characters. In January 2012, it was announced that both Aw and Tay had been replaced by Cherry Hsia and Elvin Ng respectively. Channel 8 responded that they changed Aw out to prevent viewers' fatigue of constantly seeing Aw on television and also the network is producing a new series, Beyond, which stars Aw. Fans and viewers protested the reasoning, citing there was only two drama series, Rescue 995 and Jump!, featuring Aw on two different networks and comparing to Rui En, Rui En had more series showing on the same time period.

The drama series was originally titled 我爱狐狸精 but was renamed 糊里糊涂爱上它 (Absolutely Charming).

== Episodes ==
No.	Title	Original release date	Repeat telecast	PSI reading (Repeat telecast)
1	"1"	May 1, 2012	June 13, 2013	TBA
2	"2"	May 2, 2012	June 14, 2013	TBA
3	"3"	May 3, 2012; PG Some Sexual References	June 17, 2013; PG Some Sexual References	PSI: 110 - 111
4	"4"	May 4, 2012	June 18, 2013	PSI: 81 - 82
5	"5"	May 7, 2012 PG	June 19, 2013 PG	PSI: 146 - 144
6	"6"	May 8, 2012 PG	June 20, 2013 PG	PSI: 268 - 310
7	"7"	May 9, 2012	June 21, 2013	PSI: 143 - 139
8	"8"	May 10, 2012	June 24, 2013	3h PSI: 82 - 79, 24h PSI: 55 - 87
9	"9"	May 11, 2012 PG	June 25, 2013 PG	3h PSI: 73 - 66, 24h PSI: 52 - 65
10	"10"	May 14, 2012 PG	June 26, 2013 PG	3h PSI: 39 - 46, 24h PSI: 55 - 58
11	"11"	May 15, 2012 PG	June 27, 2013 PG	3h PSI: 67 - 68, 24h PSI: 57 - 64
12	"12"	May 16, 2012 PG	June 28, 2013 PG	3h PSI: , 24h PSI:
13	"13"	May 17, 2012 PG	July 1, 2013 PG	3h PSI: , 24h PSI:
14	"14"	May 18, 2012 PG	July 2, 2013 PG	3h PSI: , 24h PSI:
15	"15"	May 21, 2012; PG Some Violence	July 3, 2013; PG Some Violence	3h PSI: , 24h PSI:
16	"16"	May 22, 2012; PG Some Violence	July 4, 2013; PG Some Violence	3h PSI: , 24h PSI:
17	"17"	May 23, 2012; PG Some Violence	July 5, 2013; PG Some Violence	3h PSI: , 24h PSI:
18	"18"	May 24, 2012; PG Some Violence	July 8, 2013; PG Some Violence	3h PSI: , 24h PSI:
19	"19"	May 25, 2012; PG Some Violence	July 9, 2013; PG Some Violence	3h PSI: , 24h PSI:
20	"20 (Finale)"	May 28, 2012 PG	July 10, 2013 PG	3h PSI: , 24h PSI:
