= Patricia Mok =

Singaporean actress (born 1971)

- Born: 17 October 1971 (age 54); Singapore
- Education: Ping Yi Secondary School; Yishun Junior College
- Occupations: Comedian; host; actress
- Years active: 1996–present

Chinese name
- Chinese: 莫小玲
- Hanyu Pinyin: Mò Xiáolíng
- Jyutping: Mok Siu Ling

Patricia Mok Siu Leng (born 17 October 1971) is a Singaporean comedian, host and actress, best known for her comedic roles on Comedy Night during her stint as a JTeam artist until 2012. She was a full-time Mediacorp artiste from 1996 to 2012.

== Early life ==
Mok was educated in Ping Yi Secondary School and Yishun Junior College.

== Career ==
Mok made her debut in the 1990s comedy show Comedy Nite. She was a cast member from 1996, until the demise of the show. Her roles in the skits helped her to land a contract with MediaCorp in 2006.

She won the Best Supporting Actress Award in the Star Awards 2003 for playing a dowdy and meek wife in Holland V, and earned two nominations in the Asian Television Awards in 2006 and 2008.

Mok was switched to hosting MediaCorp events and shows in 2010. In a 2012 interview, she confessed that she felt uncomfortable being an emcee and thought she was better suited to acting in dramas and sitcoms.

Mok is currently under the management of Fly Artistes. In 2016, she appeared in the Singaporean-Malaysian comedy film Let's Eat!.

== Personal life ==
In June 2009, Mok was molested while she was partying at Zirca, Clarke Quay. A drunk 30-year-old man, Yeoh Chuen How, had pinched her buttocks, following which Mok confronted him immediately and called the police. Mok and Yeoh settled out of court and Yeoh paid S$10,000 to Mok as compensation. Mok donated the entire sum to charity.

In January 2025, Mok's father, former air force officer Mok Kok Chye, died.

== Filmography ==
=== Television series ===
Year	Title	Role	Notes	Ref
2003	Holland V	Mo Lingling		
2004	Timeless Gift 遗情未了	Zhang Peiyun		
2004	Double Happiness	Su Meili		
2004	Double Happiness II	Su Meili		
2005	Zero to Hero	Xie Xiumei		
2007	Let It Shine	Zhao Shuliao		
2007	Just in Singapore	Mary		
2008	Love Blossoms	Yun Caixia		
2008	Love Blossoms II	Yun Caixia		
2009	Reunion Dinner	Lin Fangfang		
2009	Your Hand In Mine	Dried Chilli		
2012	Absolutely Charming	Aunt Bing Bing		
2020	Jungle Survivor 森林生存记	Sandra		
2021	Downstairs 下楼	Kopi Soh (voice)		

=== Variety show ===
Year	English title	Mandarin title	Notes	Ref
1996 - 2000	Comedy Nite	搞笑行动		
2002	One Fun Day II	惊喜一整天II		
2003	SingTel Connection	心跳爆笑夜		
2003	SingTel Fun Nite	新电信, 新发现		
2003	Sweet & Sour Talk / What’s Up Jack?	梁新发现		
2003	Top Fun I	欢乐巅峰 I		
2003	Top Fun II	欢乐巅峰 II		
2003	Comedy Nite	搞笑行动		
2005	KP Club I	鸡婆俱乐部 I		
2005	KP Club II	鸡婆俱乐部 II		
2005	101 Shopping Guide	陪你去 Shopping		
2005	I Love Shopping	陪你去 Shopping 2		
2006	Maid To Order 3	明星好帮手3		
2006	On The Beat 2	都是大发现		
2006	Stock Exchange	好货上门		
2006	Never Say Die	永不言败		
2007	My Star Guide 2	我的导游是明星 2		
2007	Welcome to Taiwan	铁定台湾		
2007	Fortune Festival At Giant 2007	爱上Giant 过肥年		
2017	Happy Can Already! 2	欢喜就好 2		

=== Film ===
Year	Title	Role	Notes	Ref
1998	Money No Enough	Jojo, Liang Chao Hui's Coffee Shop Customer		
1998	Hitman in the City			
1999	Liang Po Po: The Movie			
1999	That One No Enough	Chen Hui Yu		
2002	I Not Stupid	Miss Tan		
2003	Homerun	Mrs Ang		
2006	We Are Family			
2009	Paper			
2012	Dance Dance Dragon			
2015	King of Mahjong			
2016	Let's Eat!	Big Sister Shi		
2018	Republic of Food	Meimei		
2023	What! The Heist	Ah Hua		
2024	Money No Enough 3	Zhang Ming Hui's Younger Sister		
2024	I Not Stupid 3	Mdm Mok		
2025	I Want To Be Boss	Ling Ling		

== Awards and nominations ==
Organisation	Year	Category	Nominated work	Result	Ref
Star Awards	1998	Top 10 Most Popular Female Artistes	—N/a	Nominated	
Star Awards	1999	Top 10 Most Popular Female Artistes	—N/a	Nominated	
Star Awards	2000	Top 10 Most Popular Female Artistes	—N/a	Nominated	
Star Awards	2001	Top 10 Most Popular Female Artistes	—N/a	Nominated	
Star Awards	2002	Top 10 Most Popular Female Artistes	—N/a	Nominated	
Star Awards	2003	Best Supporting Actress	Holland V (as Mo Lingling)	Won	
Star Awards	2003	Top 10 Most Popular Female Artistes	—N/a	Nominated	
Star Awards	2004	Top 10 Most Popular Female Artistes	—N/a	Nominated	
Star Awards	2005	Top 10 Most Popular Female Artistes	—N/a	Nominated	
Star Awards	2006	Top 10 Most Popular Female Artistes	—N/a	Nominated	
Star Awards	2007	Top 10 Most Popular Female Artistes	—N/a	Nominated	
Star Awards	2009	Top 10 Most Popular Female Artistes	—N/a	Nominated	
Star Awards	2010	Unforgettable Villain	Love Blossoms II (as Yun Caixia)	Nominated	
Star Awards	2024	Top 10 Most Popular Female Artistes	—N/a	Nominated	
Star Awards	2025	Top 10 Most Popular Female Artistes	—N/a	Nominated	
