= No Limits (Singaporean TV series) =

Singaporean TV series

- 泳闯琴关
- Genre: Swimming; Violin
- Created by: Tang Yeow 陈耀; Seah Choon Guan 谢俊源
- Starring: Felicia Chin; Dai Xiangyu; Elvin Ng; Tracy Lee
- Opening theme: 《世界不孤单》 by Teresa Tseng
- Country of origin: Singapore
- Original language: Mandarin
- No. of episodes: 20

Production
- Producer: Chia Mien Yang 谢敏洋
- Running time: approx. 45 min

Original release
- Network: Mediacorp Channel 8
- Release: 7 July – 4 August 2010

No Limits (泳闯琴关) is a Singaporean drama series broadcast on Mediacorp Channel 8 from 7 July 2010 till 4 August 2010. It is to also celebrate in conjunction with the inaugural 2010 Summer Youth Olympics. It stars Felicia Chin, Dai Xiangyu, Elvin Ng & Tracy Lee as the main casts of the series.

== Plot ==
As her name suggests, You Yongxin is an avid swimmer whose ambition is to make the national team like her father You Shan, a former national swimmer. Her new competitor is the natural born swimmer Chen Fei, who has recently returned from abroad. To her shock, Fei is actually her half sister from the same mother Yvonne Fu Liling. Unfortunately, she becomes involved in a love triangle between herself, Fei, her father's old friend's Ou Yingxiong's son Ou Yaoyang and her neighbour Yule. She returns to the swimming pool to forget her sorrows and trains even harder.

== Cast ==
- Felicia Chin as You Yongxin 游泳欣
- Dai Xiangyu as Wang Yule 王宇乐
- Elvin Ng as Ou Yaoyang 欧耀阳
- Tracy Lee as Chen Fei 陈菲
- Yuan Shuai as Yang Leiming "Thunder" 杨雷鸣
- Lin Meijiao as Wang Ruoyun 王若云
- Pan Lingling as Yvonne Fu Liling 傅丽玲
- Chen Tianwen as Ou Yingxiong 欧英雄
- Rebecca Lim as Xu Jiayi 许嘉宜
- Wang Yuqing as You Shan 游山
- Li Wenhai as Chen Jianshun 陈健顺
- Teo Ser Li as Bai Nana 白娜娜
- Julie Tan as Liu Xinyu 刘欣雨
