= Like Father, Like Daughter (TV series) =

- 宝贝父女兵
- Genre: Comedy
- Written by: Ang Eng Tee 洪荣狄
- Starring: Joanne Peh; Zheng Geping; Kang Cheng Xi; Jin Yinji
- Opening theme: 自己的幸福 by Diya Tan
- Country of origin: Singapore
- Original language: Chinese
- No. of episodes: 20

Production
- Producer: 李宁强
- Running time: approx. 45 minutes

Original release
- Network: MediaCorp
- Release: August 21 – September 17, 2007

Related
- Honour and Passion; Metamorphosis

Like Father, Like Daughter (Chinese: 宝贝父女兵) is a Singaporean Chinese drama which aired on Singapore's free-to-air channel, MediaCorp TV Channel 8. It premiered on 21 August 2007 and ended its run on 17 September 2007. The drama serial consists of 20 episodes, and was screened on every weekday night at 9 pm.

== Cast ==
- Joanne Peh as Dai Chunchun
- Zheng Geping as Jin Gang aka King Kong
- Kang Cheng Xi as Chris Li Kaizhe
- Vincent Ng as Ah Wei

Cast	Role
Michelle Chong	Mei Qi (Maggie)
Pan Lingling	Babara
Jin Yinji	Guai Po Po (Deceased - Ep 19)
Jacqueline Sue	Ah Lian (Cecilia)
Nelson Chia	Akirah
Nick Shen	Coconut, Ah Gui
Jimmy Nah	Da Zhi Lao
Cherrianne	Young Dai Chunchun (Primary 5)
Jillian Loe Yuting	Babara's younger daughter
Chua Cheng Pou 蔡清炮	Monkey

== Plot ==
Zhigang aka Jingang (Zheng Geping), a well-built but simple-minded father has an intelligent and vivacious daughter Chunchun. Unfortunately, Jingang who is always between jobs, does not know how to bring up or educate his rebellious daughter. In the end, Chunchun has to be transferred from school to school as a result of disciplinary problems. Nevertheless, Jingang still has high hopes that she will embark on a successful career, either as a doctor or lawyer.

Implicated by his cronies, Jingang is jailed. With her only family member behind bars, Chunchun (Cherryann) has to be put up for adoption against her wishes. She decides to run away and while wandering the streets, she is taken in by an eccentric rag & bone old woman. Despite her strange personality, the old lady (Jin Yinji) gets along very well with Chunchun. Before long, Chunchun has grown up. Although she is very pretty, she pays little attention to her appearance. In addition, as a result of her fiery temper, those who know her tend to give her a wide berth. Instead of fulfilling her father’s wish of becoming a doctor or lawyer, Chunchun (Joanne Peh) runs a string of successful small-time ‘heterodox’ businesses in Queenstown, ranging from paper and cardboard trade, scrap business, illegal food peddling to provision of lion dance performances during festive seasons.

As Chunchun is not interested in affairs of the heart, she keeps those suitors who want to woo her at arm’s length. It is not until she meets Li Kaize (Kang Cheng Xi), a very good-looking undergraduate, that she changes her mind. However, as Kaize is learned and comes from a wealthy background, Chunchun is acutely conscious of their disparity and does not harbour any romantic illusions about him. Kaize is initially quite put off by Chunchun’s boorish mannerism. However, after further interaction, he is attracted to her kind-heartedness and her lack of pretence.

After his release from jail, Jingang immediately looks for his daughter. As Chunchun does not want to disappoint her father who has pinned high hopes on her, she tries to keep her whereabouts a secret from him. Jingang is once again implicated by his cronies and with Chunchun’s help, he is finally able to leave the clutches of the underworld. Both father and daughter are finally reunited after 10 years. They set up a business together hand in hand.

Chunchun decides to work hard. Encouraged by Kaize, she enrols in English classes. Apart from her inferiority complex, there are also many girls vying for Kaize’s attention which discourages Chunchun from holding out any hope of a future with him. As such, she is caught by surprise when Kaize suddenly declares his love for her. Will they be able to overcome the disparity in their academic qualifications, social background and human intervention to come together?

== Viewership ==
Week	Date	Average Number of audience in 5 weekdays (Round off to nearest thousand)
Week 1	21 August 2007 to 24 August 2007	643, 000
Week 2	27 August 2007 to 31 August 2007	650, 000
Week 3	3 September 2007 to 7 September 2007	728, 000
Week 4	10 September 2007 to 14 September 2007	740, 000
Week 5	17 September 2007	786, 000

== Accolades ==
Organisation	Year	Category	Nominee	Result	Ref
Star Awards	2007	Best Actor	Zheng Ge Ping	Won	
Star Awards	2007	Best Actress	Joanne Peh	Nominated	
Star Awards	2007	Best Supporting Actor	Nick Shen	Nominated	
Star Awards	2007	Best Supporting Actress	Jacqueline Sue 徐艳玲	Nominated	
Star Awards	2007	Best Drama Serial	—N/a	Nominated	
