= X3 Trouble =

x3 Trouble
- Directed by: Patrick Yau
- Starring: Dai Xiangyu; Rynn Lim; Jack Lim; Landy Wen; Wang Shujun; Lin Yu Zhong; Lin Derong; Huang Qiming; Lim Yee Chung; Yan Weien
- Production companies: Passion Entertainment mm2 Entertainment; RAM Entertainment
- Distributed by: Hua Ying
- Release dates: 16 March 2012 (Taiwan and Malaysia); 5 April 2012 (Singapore)
- Running time: 94 min
- Country: Malaysia
- Language: Mandarin

x3 Trouble (Chinese: 行X踏錯; pinyin: háng x tà cuò) is a Malaysian thriller-comedy film about three good friends staging a car heist. Directed by Patrick Yau, the film stars Dai Xiangyu, Rynn Lim and Jack Lim. It was released on 5 April 2012.

It was first screened in Taiwan and Malaysia, followed by Singapore.

== Plot ==
Three buddies (Dai Yang Tian, Rynn Lim and Jack Lim) steal a luxury car, landing them into a whole lot of trouble with everyone they meet, including a brutal killer, one of the friends' former wife and a gorgeous woman (Landy Wen) who seems death-proof.

== Cast ==
- Dai Xiangyu as 1st Friend
- Rynn Lim as 2nd Friend
- Jack Lim as 3rd Friend
- Landy Wen as Beautiful Woman
- Lim Yee Chung as Underwear Vendor
