= Let It Shine (2007 TV series) =

- 萤火虫的梦
- Genre: Modern Drama
- Starring: Felicia Chin; Shaun Chen; Adam Chen
- Opening theme: 这就是我们 by Huang Ziyang, Chen Shimei, Huang Yelun & Zhong Xinyuan
- Ending theme: 1) 打气 by Huang Ziyang; 2) My Star by Felicia Chin; 3) 自己的梦 by Chen Shimei; 4) 说不出的浪漫 & 心的翅膀 by Huang Ziyang & Chen Shimei
- Country of origin: Singapore
- Original language: Chinese
- No. of episodes: 20

Production
- Running time: approx. 45 minutes

Original release
- Network: MediaCorp
- Release: 16 January – 12 February 2007

Let It Shine (Simplified Chinese: 萤火虫的梦) is a Singaporean Chinese drama which was telecast on Singapore's free-to-air channel, MediaCorp TV Channel 8. It made its debut on 16 January 2007 and ended its 20-episode run on 12 February 2007.

The show achieved pretty low viewership rates for a local drama serial in Singapore. Less than 250,000 viewers tuned into the premiere episode, making it one of the more least-watched Singaporean television dramas. In fact, the figures was the lowest for all Singapore Chinese Dramas in the year of 2007.

Despite this show being a teenage idol drama, 23.5% of the viewers were actually housewives, while only about 14.5% were students and teenagers.

== Viewership Rating ==
Day (s) of telecast	Number of audience	Points
16 January 2007 (First day of telecast)	221 000	5.5 points

== Cast ==
- Felicia Chin as Guo Yaoyao 郭瑶瑶
- Shaun Chen as Ma Zikang 马子康
- Adam Chen as Lin Haifeng 林海峰
- Xiang Yun as Guo Yaoyao's Mother 郭瑶瑶母亲
- Zhu Houren as Guo Yaoyao's Father 郭瑶瑶父亲
- Ng Hui as Guan Yulin 关玉琳
- Lin Meijiao as Chen Meihua 陈美花
- Yan Bingliang as Wang Bingshu 王柄树
- Patricia Mok as Zhao Shuliao 昭淑聊
- Huang Zhiyang 黄智阳 as Guo Baobao 郭宝宝
- Wu Sijia 吴思佳 as Liu Xishi 刘西施

== Reception ==
After an episode depicting self-harm, four students who are at the primary six level in a girls school were discovered showing signs of self-harm. It was concluded that one of the girls treated it as a trendy thing to do and asked her friends to do it together. When interviewed, producer Wang You Hong regretted such an incident had happened and trying to reflect a current trend which had not been mostly discovered by parents and educators. A light touch was applied and there was no intention to popularise and encouraging the act.

The show was criticized for not reflecting the current state of the education sector which Wang refuted that most of the criticism were not valid and some artistic license was taken for some parts.
