= Moo Yan Yee =

Malaysian actress

- Born: 30 July 1988 (age 37); Ipoh, Perak, Malaysia
- Occupation(s): Actress, model, host
- Years active: 2007–present
- Height: 1.72 m (5 ft 8 in)
- Spouse: Andy Yik (m. 2012)
- Children: 2

Chinese name
- Traditional Chinese: 巫恩儀
- Simplified Chinese: 巫恩仪
Transcriptions
Standard Mandarin
- Hanyu Pinyin: Wū Ēnyí
Yue: Cantonese
- Jyutping: mou4 jan1 ji4

Moo Yan Yee (Chinese: 巫恩仪; pinyin: Wū Ēnyí, born 30 July 1988), also known simply as Yan Yee, is a Malaysian actress. She was a former beauty queen and model before joining MediaCorp in 2008.

== Career ==
After finishing Form 6, Moo entered and won the Miss Malaysia Global Beauty Queen International contest in 2007. She modeled for numerous commercials and print ads before joining MediaCorp and switching to television. She made her television debut in the 2008 Singapore-Malaysia co-production Friends Forever.

== Personal life ==
Moo came from a working-class background and often had to help her parents at their hawker stall in addition to caring for her younger siblings while juggling school commitments. She is now married and has 2 daughters.

== Filmography ==
Year	Work	Role	Notes
2013	Superhero At Home 家有超男	Wang Jiamei 王嘉美	
2013	The Enchanted 浴女图	Qian Jiayi 钱家怡	Malaysian Production
2012	The Quarters 猪仔馆人家	Guan Naidong 关耐冬	Malaysian Production
2011	Dark Sunset 黑色夕阳	Ye Tingting 叶婷婷	
2011	Destiny in Her Hands 断掌的女人	Luo Yingyu 罗银玉	Malaysian Production
2011	The Seeds of Life 漁米人家	Li Meifen 李美芬	Malaysian Production
2010	With You 我在你左右	Lin Jieying 林洁莹	
2010	The Glittering Days 星光灿烂	Su Xiao Ling 苏小琳	Malaysian Production
2009	Table of Glory 乒乓圆	Mary-Ann 马丽安	
2009	My Destiny 幸福满贯		Malaysian Production
2008	Friends Forever 我爱麻糍	Ruby 张慧君	Malaysian Production
