= Ang Eng Tee =

Singaporean television scriptwriter

- Traditional Chinese: 洪榮狄
- Simplified Chinese: 洪荣狄
Transcriptions
Standard Mandarin
- Hanyu Pinyin: Hóng Róngdí
Yue: Cantonese
- Jyutping: Wang^{4} Wing^{4} Dik^{6}
Southern Min
- Hokkien POJ: Âng Êng-te̍k

Ang Eng Tee (Chinese: 洪荣狄) is a Singaporean television scriptwriter and novelist, known for his contributions to Chinese-language drama series on Singapore's Mediacorp Channel 8. He joined the Singapore Broadcasting Corporation (SBC) in 1983 and has since written several well-received drama series such as The Little Nyonya (2008), Holland V and The Price of Peace. In 2006, he left Mediacorp to work as a freelance scriptwriter. Since then, he has continued to write dramas for Channel 8 on a contractual basis, while also participating in Chinese productions such as The Little Nyonya (2020) and Sisterhood.

== Early life and education ==
Ang was born into a large family, the youngest of eleven siblings, in 1960. He grew in a village known Kou Teu Kio (九条桥), located near what is currently known as the ITE Headquarters & ITE College Central located at Ang Mo Kio.

At a very young age, Ang developed an interest in writing. At 18 years old, he participated in a novel-writing competition organised by the People's Association, where he placed fourth. During his youth, his academic performance was average, and after attending a private high school, he did not gain admission to university.

== Career ==
=== 1983–1989: Early career ===
In 1983, after completing his National Service, Ang chanced upon an advertisement for the first Professional Scriptwriting Training Course (Mandarin) organised by the Singapore Broadcasting Corporation (the predecessor of Mediacorp), and decided to enroll in it due to his interest in writing. After graduating from the course, he joined the broadcaster as an assistant scriptwriter and was promoted to scriptwriter two years later. In 1983, he was then promoted to script supervisor, with his first credited script-supervising work being Paint A Rainbow.

=== 1990–2006: Breakthrough ===
In 1990, he was promoted to story planner, with his first work being Marry Me, which explored contemporary views on marriage, cohabitation, and divorce through three couples in the story. In 1996, after working on several other series, he decided to undertake a shift in his creative direction and wrote Tofu Street, a drama set in 1940-1950s Chinatown.The modestly budgeted drama achieved strong ratings and positive reviews, outperforming several high-budget productions and winning the Best Drama Serial award at the Star Awards 1996. The success of the series brought recognition to his writing ability, and he was subsequently entrusted with leading major drama productions.

The following year, he served as story planner for The Price of Peace, a World War II–themed drama that again received critical acclaim, winning Best Drama Serial at the Star Awards. Two years later, another major production, Stepping Out, also achieved both strong ratings and positive audience reception.

In 2001, when Singapore Press Holdings entered the television broadcasting industry and launched Channel U, Singapore had two television stations for the first time. The introduction of Channel U created strong competition for Channel 8, particularly in the highly contested 7 p.m. prime-time slot. Channel U launched with Hong Kong drama A Kindred Spirit and Taiwanese drama Taiwan Ah Cheng, posing a significant challenge. In response, Ang was tasked with developing a long-running drama series, which he created Holland V, a distinctly local Singaporean story designed to engage audiences, which achieved over one million viewers in ratings.

Ang was later promoted to Assistant Vice-President of Chinese drama productions at Mediacorp, becoming one of the highest-ranking creative personnel in the broadcaster.

=== 2006–present: Independent work ===
After 23 years with Mediacorp, Ang left in 2007 to pursue an independent scriptwriting career while continuing to work with the broadcaster on a contractual basis. He explained that, as a story planner, the stories he developed were often completed by other scriptwriters, with the final scripts sometimes differing from his original vision, requiring him to make time-consuming revisions. Although he was able to request full responsibility for his own projects, he ultimately decided to change his working arrangement to avoid placing the company in a difficult position. He subsequently created several television dramas, including The Golden Path, Just in Singapore, The Little Nyonya, Tiger Mum, and 118.

In particular, The Little Nyonya which aired in 2008, which focused on the shared Peranakan Chinese culture in Singapore and Malaysia, achieved the highest television ratings in Singapore in 15 years and became one of the country's most internationally recognised television drama productions. Ang served as both the story planner and scriptwriter of the series. He explained that the idea had been in development for a long time, inspired by his experiences living in eastern Singapore, particularly areas such as Katong and Joo Chiat, which are known for their rich Peranakan heritage. He was also deeply moved during the writing process and reportedly wrote parts of the script in an emotional state. In addition, he conducted extensive research over several years, describing it as the production for which he undertook the most comprehensive preparation.

In 2010, Ang was invited by Taiwanese production company Next TV, under creative director Cheung Wah-Biu to join as a contracted lead creator. He developed a 30-episode youth-oriented inspirational drama centred on teenage girls, however it was never produced as Next TV ceased broadcasting due to financial strain.

In 2020, Ang collaborated with G.H.Y Culture & Media and a Chinese production team to remake his earlier work The Little Nyonya, producing The Little Nyonya (2020). He later continued working with the same team on Sisterhood, and also co-authored a novel adaptation of the series with scriptwriter Xiao Jixiangtian (小吉祥天).

In 2023, he returned to write the drama series All That Glitters for Mediacorp after a hiatus.

== Writing style ==
Ang was noted to excel at writing dramas with nostalgic themes, with Tofu Street, The Price of Peace and Stepping Out being awarded the Best Drama Serial award consecutively in the Star Awards.

== Personal life ==
Ang is married to Zheng Lizhu, which was also a former scriptwriter. The couple have two daughters. Their elder daughter is a lawyer, while their younger daughter also graduated with a degree in law.

== Filmography ==
As Story Planner (Note: Ang worked on multiple television series as an assistant scriptwriter, scriptwriter, and script editor. Due limited availability of sources, only productions in which he is credited as a story planner (故事人) are listed.)
Year	Programme title	Ref.
1990	Marry Me	
1991	Home Sweet Home	
1991	Lady Steel	
1993	Battle Of Justice	
1994	Young Justice Bao	
1994	Larceny Of Love	
1994	Love At Last	
1996	Curtain Call (Television film)	
1996	Triad Justice	
1996	Tofu Street	
1997	The Price of Peace	
1999	Stepping Out	
1999	My Grandpa	
2000	My Home Affairs	
2000	Angel's Dream	
2001	The Reunion	
2001	You Light Up My Life	
2002	The Vagrant	
2003	Holland V	
2004	Double Happiness	
2004	Double Happiness II	
2005	A Life of Hope	
2005	A New Life	
2006	A Million Treasures	
2006	The Shining Star	
2007	The Golden Path	
2007	The Peak	
2007	Like Father, Like Daughter	
2008	Just in Singapore	
2008	The Little Nyonya	
2009	Reunion Dinner	
2009	Table of Glory	
2009	Together	
2010	Breakout	
2010	The Best Things in Life	
2011	A Song To Remember	
2011	On the Fringe	
2012	It Takes Two	
2013	The Journey: A Voyage	
2013	I'm in Charge	
2014	The Journey: Tumultuous Times	
2015	Tiger Mum	
2014-2015	118	
2016	Hero	
2016-2017	118 II	
2018	118 Reunion	
2020	The Little Nyonya	
2023	Sisterhood	
2023	All That Glitters	
2025	Emerald Hill - The Little Nyonya Story	
2025	The Spirit Hunter	
2026	Highway to Somewhere	

== Other work ==
Ang has written novels and proses, using the pen name of Hong Di (洪笛) and Sahara (沙哈拉).
