= Kang Cheng Xi =

Singaporean actor

- Born: Kang Cheng Xi; 5 December 1984 (age 40); Singapore
- Occupation: Actor
- Years active: 2006-present
- Partner: Amy See
- Awards: 2006 Second Runner-Up of Star Idol; Nomination for Best Newcomer, Star Awards 07
- Website: Blogger

Kang Cheng Xi (born 5 December 1984), also known as Jiang Chengxi, is a Singaporean actor. He first entered showbiz through the competition Star Idol but has since left MediaCorp to concentrate on university studies. He is currently a cabin crew.

== Career ==
During the Star Idol competition, Kang provided efficient substances. In the semi-finals, he was required to strip down to red boxers on national television during a bed scene where he was pestering his on-screen wife Leann for sex.

He played Alicia Neo's love interest in the interactive drama of Star Idol 'Who Is It', and was eliminated after her when his character is killed by a gunshot.

Although 3rd in rank, Kang is the 2nd to get a contract with Mediacorp, and his first role is a lead/supporting actor in the drama A Million Treasures, which made its debut on 4 December 2006 and aired its last episode on 5 January 2007. Kang plays Ma Lu, an ex-convict who turns over a new leaf. His first role is felt to be larger and more major than the Star Idol champion - Bryan Wong's first role. Kang then went on to starring in the drama Like Father, Like Daughter In 2008, he starred in Just in Singapore.

Kang's first role is Ma Lu, the brother of Ma Da (Li Nanxing). Ma Lu was imprisoned for stabbing a person with a broken beer bottle. The original length of the jail term was 2 years but due to his good behaviour, he was released somewhere after a year. Upon release, Ma Lu was not hired by anyone, and Ma Da hired him to be an assistant in a 5 star hotel under him (Ma Da was the chief chef). However, after two weeks, Ma Lu resigned, along with new friend Xiao Bao (played by Felicia Chin). The two of them created a vehicle roadside stall together.

In a Mediacorp Forum poll, Ma Lu was voted as the second favourite character after Xiao Bao, surpassing veterans Li Nan Xing and Zoe Tay, with 22.5%(as of 1 March 2007) of the total votes.

== Personal life ==
Kang was educated at Chung Cheng High School (Main) and Serangoon Junior College and was captain of the bowling team there. He joined Star Idol whilst a first year engineering student at Nanyang Technological University.

== Filmography ==
Year - Title - Role

2005 to 2006 - Star Idol - Contestant

2005 to 2006 - Who Is It? - Himself

2006 to 2007 - A Million Treasures - Ma Lu

2007 - Like Father, Like Daughter - Li Kaize

2008 - Just in Singapore - Su Dingyi

== Accolades ==
Star Awards – Hosting Awards
| Year | Category | Nominated work | Result |
|---|---|---|---|
| 2007 | Best Newcomer | — | Nominated |
