= Nelson Chia =

Singaporean theatre director, actor and lecturer

Nelson Chia (simplified Chinese: 谢燊杰; traditional Chinese: 謝燊傑; pinyin: Xìe Shēnjíe) is a Singaporean theatre director, actor and lecturer. He is the co-founder of Nine Years Theatre.

== Early life and education ==
Chia studied at The Chinese High School and Hwa Chong Junior College. He holds a Bachelor of Arts in Theatre Studies from National University of Singapore and a master's degree in Theatre Arts (Directing) from Goldsmiths College, University of London.

== Career ==
Chia has been working in theatre both as an actor and director since 1994. Chia's first major TV role in the drama Together Whenever, which was aired on SPH MediaWorks Channel U, alongside Erica Lee. He briefly headed the Department of Theatre in Nanyang Academy of Fine Arts, but later left the post in order to devote more time to his craft. He was also an adjunct lecturer at LASALLE College of the Arts and a full-time lecturer at the Theatre Studies Program in National University of Singapore. He was the associate artistic director at Toy Factory Productions (formerly Toy Factory Theatre Ensemble) from 2003 to 2023, an Associate Artist with The Substation from 2007 to 2009 and the founding member of a collaborative ensemble A Group Of People (2008-2012).

Chia founded Mandarin theatre company Nine Years Theatre in 2012.

== Personal life ==
Chia is married to fellow theatre practitioner and co-founder of Nine Years Theatre Mia Chee, and has two twin daughters (born 2004).

== Theatre ==
=== As director ===
- Rosencrantz and Guildenstern Are Dead, Goldsmiths College, London, 2000
- Animal Farm (in Mandarin, 動物農莊), The Theatre Practice, Victoria Theatre, Singapore, 2002
- Oleanna (in Mandarin, 奧里安娜), The Theatre Practice, Singapore, 2002
- Mergers And Wills (in Mandarin, 暗流胸涌), (as co-director), Toy Factory Productions, Singapore, 2004
- First Light, Toy Factory Productions, Esplanade Theatre Studio, Singapore, 2008
- LIV - Full Frontal, A Group of People, Esplanade Theatre Studio, Singapore Arts Festival, Singapore, 2009
- Who's Afraid of Virginia Woolf?, Nine Years Theatre, Esplanade Theatre Studio, Huayi Festival 2012, Singapore 2012
- Twelve Angry Men, Nine Years Theatre, Esplanade Theatre Studio, Huayi Festival 2013, Singapore 2013
- Who's Afraid of Virginia Woolf?, Nine Years Theatre, Dom Pedro V Theatre, Macau Arts Festival 2013, Singapore 2013

=== As an actor ===
- Lao Jiu (in Mandarin, 老九), The Theatre Practice, Singapore, 1990
- Titoudao (in Mandarin, 剃頭刀), Toy Factory Productions, Singapore, 1994
- The Coffin is Too Big For The Hole (in Mandarin, 棺材太大洞太小), The Theatre Practice, Singapore, 1995
- The Soldier and His Wife (in Mandarin, 都是當兵惹得禍), The Theatre Practice, Fort Canning Drama Centre, Singapore, 1996
- Love A La Zen (in Mandarin, 愛情觀自在), The Theatre Practice, Victoria Theatre, Singapore, 1999
- A Midsummer Night's Dream (in Mandarin, 仲夏夜之夢), The Theatre Practice, Singapore, 1999
- Hundred Years In Waiting (in Mandarin, 百年的等待), The Theatre Practice, Singapore, 2001
- The Island (in Mandarin, 島), (as John), The Theatre Practice, Singapore, 2002
- Animal Farm (in Mandarin, 動物農莊), The Theatre Practice, Victoria Theatre, Singapore, 2002
- Mad Phoenix (in Mandarin, 南海十三郎), (as Title Role), Toy Factory Productions, Esplanade Theatre Studio, Huayi Festival, Singapore, 2003
- Porcelain, (as John Lee), Toy Factory Productions, Singapore, 2005
- Big Fool Lee (in Mandarin and Cantonese, 李大傻), Toy Factory Productions, Singapore, 2005
- Nanjing: 1937, The Substation, The Substation SeptFest, Singapore, 2007
- Nanjing: 1937 Phase II, The Substation, The Substation SeptFest, Singapore, 2008
- Own Time Own Target, W!LD RICE, Drama Centre Theatre, Singapore, 2009

== Filmography ==
Film

Year	Title	Role	Notes	Ref
1996	Agong Bak Kut Teh 阿公肉骨茶	Alan	Cameo, telemovie	

Television

Year	Title	Role	Notes	Ref
2003	Together Whenever 天倫	Zhengbei		
2007	Like Father, Like Daughter 寶貝父女兵	Akirah		
2007	Live Again 天堂鸟	Sayang		
2008	Just in Singapore 一房半厅一水缸	Robert		
2009	Table of Glory 乒乓圆	Richard		
2010	Happy Family 过好年	bread skin		

2006

- Crossfire 針鋒相對 (forum programme, in Mandarin), (as host), Mediacorp Channel U
