= Holland V (TV series) =

- 荷兰村
- Created by: Ang Eng Tee（洪荣狄）
- Written by: Ang Eng Tee (洪荣狄)
- Starring: Chen Liping; Xie Shaoguang; Patricia Mok; Cynthia Koh; Jeanette Aw; Vivian Lai; Pierre Png; Xiang Yun; Mark Lee
- Opening theme: 快乐密码 (The Password To Happiness) By 邓妙华，邓桂华 and 邓雪华
- Country of origin: Singapore
- Original language: Mandarin
- No. of episodes: 125

Production
- Producers: Kok Len Shoong and Li Ningqiang (李宁强）

Original release
- Network: MediaCorp Channel 8
- Release: 9 June – 28 November 2003

Related
- Double Happiness; Double Happiness II; Portrait of Home; Love Blossoms; Love Blossoms II; It Takes Two; Hero; 118; 118 II; 118 Reunion

Holland V (Chinese: 荷兰村) is a 2003 Singaporean drama series produced by MediaCorp. It stars Chen Liping, Xie Shaoguang, Patricia Mok, Cynthia Koh, Jeanette Aw, Vivian Lai, Pierre Png, Xiang Yun and Mark Lee as the casts of the series. The series revolves around the Mo family operating a nasi lemak restaurant located at Holland Village.

Originally intended to be 115 episodes long, the series was extended to 125 episodes after strong viewership. This drama was also well received in the Star Awards 2003 ceremony as it became one of the two dramas to have won every one of four major acting categories (the other was The Dream Makers II in Star Awards 2016).

== Plot ==
The main female character in the show is "Big Sister" Mo Wanwan, whom is known not only for her famous nasi lemak, but also for her Herculean strength, huge appetite and rotund build. Yet, she hasn't always looked like that. The hefty-sized Mo used to be a pretty, svelte girl, and had a daughter, Lin Siting, with Lin Jingcai at the age of 18. Jingcai then brought the baby back home to be taken care of by his wife Su Yueping, who is unable to conceive. Ever since Jingcai was put behind bars for a crime he committed, Yueping forbids Wanwan from seeing Siting. The two women are always squabbling, and are known as "the most quarrelsome duo in Holland Village".

Upset from not being able to see her daughter, Wanwan turns her misery into eating sprees. Within a decade, she has turned into a boorish 'Iron Lady' whom everyone fears. She is however, forced to look into her weighty issues when she finds herself falling for Fang Nuowen, a medical doctor.

Wanwan has six siblings: second sister, the deceptively skinny Mo Lingling, possesses a formidable kick when she's provoked. Otherwise, though, Mo Lingling is all demure and kind but sadly, she is often bullied by her colleagues and even her own foul-tempered husband, Tian Dahua.

Third sister, Mo Yanyan, also older twin sister to Mo Jingjing, is a lazybones who holds a record of sleeping continuously for 3 days and nights. She soon begins to see the harsh reality of the working world but yet dreams of amassing S$100 million by 30 years old.

Mo Jingjing is the exact opposite of her older twin sister, Mo Yanyan. She is dim-witted, has a low IQ but works very hard at her eldest sister Wanwan's nasi lemak restaurant. An innocent and kind girl who often gets cheated of her money and love, she nevertheless remained optimistic and bear no grudges against those who had done her wrong. Although her family often berates her for being stupid, Lady Luck is always by her side – she strikes lottery frequently and everyone begs her for lottery numbers.

As a dedicated botanist, Mo Rourou, is yet another pair of twins with her younger twin brother, Mo Yangyang, whose life revolves around nothing but plants. Though blessed with good looks, suitors are often put off by her highly scientific talks and unromantic soul. When out collecting specimens in the forest on one occasion, Rourou runs into her love interest's half-brother and is raped. She wakes up from the ordeal mentally traumatised.

The only son and baby of the family and also younger twin brother to Rourou, Yangyang is agile and alert, and the latter is quickly promoted in the Singapore Army and Singapore Police Force. However, when his girlfriend runs into some problems with the law, he gets himself onto the wrong side of the law in a bid to cover up for her.

In the final episode, Mo Wanwan is about to marry Fang. Meanwhile, Yang Xiong, heartbroken, leaves for the airport. Mo Wanwan, torn between the two men, flips a coin to decide. A message appears saying, “Stay tuned to find out who Wanwan chooses after the advertisement.” After the credits, the bridal car is seen driving toward the airport, strongly implying that she chooses Yang Xiong instead of Fang.

== Cast ==
=== Mo family ===
- Chen Liping as Mo Wanwan 莫婉婉
- Patricia Mok as Mo Lingling 莫玲玲
- Cynthia Koh as Mo Yanyan 莫燕燕
- Jeanette Aw as Mo Jingjing 莫晶晶
- Vivian Lai as Mo Rourou 莫柔柔
- Pierre Png as Mo Yangyang 莫洋洋

=== Others ===
- Xie Shaoguang as Yang Xiong 杨雄
- Xiang Yun as Su Yueping 苏月萍
- Huang Yiliang as Tian Dahua 田大华
- Huang Wenyong as Lin Jingcai 林精采
- Zheng Geping as Fang Nuowen 方诺文
- Mark Lee as Su Hao 苏豪
- Shaun Chen as Yu Hongzhi 余宏志
- Jamie Yeo as Lin Siting 林丝婷
- Yao Wenlong as Wu Ah Ming 吴亚明
- Chen Tianwen as Gao Tianxiang 高天祥
- Chen Guohua as Liang Ah Huo 梁阿火
- Hu Wensui as Yang Zhe 杨哲
- Le Yao as Yang Lin 杨琳
- Jeff Wang as Edison Ying Tiancheng 应天承
- Zhang Yaodong as Ying Tianyang 应天扬
- Wendy Tseng as He Yujie 何雨洁
- Ho Yeow Sun as Angel
- Margaret Lee
- Zhang Xinxiang
- Alice Ho

== Production ==
The series' producer is Kok Len Shoong.

== Accolades ==
At the Star Awards 2003, the show, at time on the ceremony, set a record for the most number of acting nominations awarded to a cast in a single year, with nine (four were in the Best Supporting Actor category, which was also a record). The drama also made notable history by becoming the first show to earn such distinction on winning all four major acting categories at the ceremony; at eight wins (five won during the main ceremony), it originally had the highest number of wins in a Star Awards ceremony until the 2009 ceremony, where it was first beaten by The Little Nyonya's nine wins (the current record holder as of 2016 was The Dream Makers II (another drama with a distinction of winning all four major acting categories), which won 12).

Additionally, at the Star Awards 25th Anniversary show in 2007, Holland V's theme song was voted as one of the top five favourites theme songs and the character of Mo Wanwan (portrayed by Chen Liping) was named one of the five most memorable characters. The show itself was honoured as one of the top five favourite dramas. The character of Edison Ying Tiancheng (portrayed by Jeff Wang) was named one of the Top 10 most memorable villains.

Ceremony	Year	Category	Nominee	Result	Ref
Star awards	2003	Best Screenplay 最佳剧本	Ang Eng Tee	Won	
Star awards	2003	Best Theme Song	"快乐密码" by the Theng sisters	Nominated	
Star awards	2003	Young Talent Award	Wang Yu 王宇	Won	
Star awards	2003	Best Actor	Xie Shaoguang	Won	
Star awards	2003	Best Actress	Chen Liping	Won	
Star awards	2003	Best Actress	Jeanette Aw	Nominated	
Star awards	2003	Best Supporting Actor	Huang Yiliang	Won	
Star awards	2003	Best Supporting Actor	Huang Wenyong	Nominated	
Star awards	2003	Best Supporting Actor	Jeff Wang	Nominated	
Star awards	2003	Best Supporting Actor	Yao Wenlong	Nominated	
Star awards	2003	Best Supporting Actress	Patricia Mok	Won	
Star awards	2003	Best Supporting Actress	Xiang Yun	Nominated	
Star awards	2003	Best Drama Serial	—N/a	Won	
Star awards	2003	Top Rated Drama Series 最高收视率电视剧	—N/a	Won	
Star awards	2007	Top Five Favourite Drama Theme Song	快乐密码 by the Theng sisters	Won	

Preceded by Beautiful Connection; 2002	Star Awards for Best Drama Serial; Holland V 2003	Succeeded by A Child's Hope (season 2); 2004
