= The Seeds of Life =

Television program

- 漁米人家
- Starring: Melvin Sia; Shaun Chen; Eelyn Kok
- Opening theme: 别无所求 by 郑仲杰
- Countries of origin: Malaysia; Singapore
- Original language: Mandarin
- No. of episodes: 30

Production
- Running time: 60 minutes (approx.)

Original release
- Network: ntv7
- Release: February 2011 – March 2011
- Network: Mediacorp Channel 8
- Release: 7 March – 17 April 2012

Related
- Code of Honour; Destiny In Her Hands

The Seeds of Life is the 20th co-production of MediaCorp TV and ntv7. It was scheduled to air every Monday to Thursday at 10:00pm on Malaysia's ntv7. It was shown on Mediacorp Channel 8 on weekdays at 7pm. It stars Melvin Sia, Shaun Chen & Eelyn Kok as the casts of this series.

== Cast ==
- Melvin Sia as Luo Shi Jie
- Shaun Chen as Luo Shi Cong
- Eelyn Kok as Su Xiao Yu
- Pearly Chong as Grandmother
- Angie Seow as Su Xiao Wen
- Ken Tan as Pan De Jun
- Moo Yan Yee as Li Mei Fen
- Mers Sheng as Xie Zheng Shun
- Kay Siow Wai as Xie Yan Qi
