= Just in Singapore =

- 一房半厅一水缸
- Genre: Comedy; Family; Neighbours
- Written by: Ang Eng Tee 洪荣狄
- Starring: Chen Liping; Huang Wenyong; Fiona Xie; Kang Cheng Xi; Li Yinzhu
- Opening theme: 屋檐 by Yi Xun
- Ending theme: 替我爱你 by Diya Tan
- Country of origin: Singapore
- Original languages: Chinese; Some English and Malay dialogue
- No. of episodes: 30

Production
- Producer: He Fa Ming 何法明
- Running time: approx. 45 minutes per episode

Original release
- Network: MediaCorp TV Channel 8
- Release: 25 February – 4 April 2008

Related
- Taste of Love; The Truth

Just in Singapore (Chinese: 一房半厅一水缸; lit. 'One Room', 'Half a Living Room', 'and a Water Basin') is a Singaporean Chinese modern comedic drama which was telecasted on Singapore's free-to-air channel, MediaCorp Channel 8. It made its debut on 25 February 2008 and ended on 4 April 2008. This drama serial consists of 30 episodes, and was screened on every weekday night at 9:00 pm. The series was repeated at 2 am on Sundays.

== Cast ==
=== Main cast ===
- Chen Liping as Nancy
- Huang Wenyong as Lin Bang (Francis)
- Fiona Xie as Lin Xiu Ming
- Kang Cheng Xi as Su Ding Yi
- Li Yinzhu as Zi Dong Sao ("Automatic Auntie")

=== Supporting cast ===
- Jimmy Nah (MC King) as San Wan (Actor died during period of filming)
- Apple Hong as Qian Qian
- Paige Chua as Lin Xiu Zhen
- Hong Huifang as Wang Jiao
- Adam Chen as Ma Zhi Gang
- Patricia Mok as Ma Li (Mary)
- Nelson Chia as Luo Ba (Robert)
- Liang Tian as Kopi Shu
- He Bing as Kopi Sao
- Ong Ai Leng as Shu Min
- Rayson Tan as Jian Hui
- Zhang Xin Quan as Peter
- Yan Bingliang as Ah Pao
- Zhang Wei as Mr. Fang
- Hong Da Mu as Granny Ma
- Vivian Lai as Jin Yan
- Chen Huihui
- Haden Hee as Roger

== Synopsis ==
The story is set in a HDB estate and revolves around its occupants.Characters include Lin Bang, an over-the-hill stage-singer, and his family; Robert and Mary, a married couple who are not disabled in any way but totally rely on relief funds from the government to get by; Ma Zhigang, a man without conscience who secretly caused his grandmother's death so he can claim insurance funds; 'Auntie Auto' and 'San Wan who are misers; 'Uncle Kopi' and 'Auntie Kopi' who are still living in their rental flat.

Uncle Kopi and Auntie Kopi have a large ceramic tub at home. Left behind by Uncle Kopi's father, it has held water for the baths of many generations in their family. When their youngest daughter wishes to entrust her parents with the care of her young son, she is worried that the tub may be a hazard and thus asks her parents to dispose of it. The old couple is unwilling to give it up and decide to put it at their neighbour Grandmother Ma's home for the time being.

Grandmother Ma's grandson Ma Zhigang is a lazy young man who refuses to hold a proper job. He owes a huge debt and so decides to sell the tub. However, he runs into loansharks while on the way to sell the tub and therefore leaves the tub behind while on the run. He is saved by Qianqian, a Vietnamese bride brought to Singapore by San Wan. Zhigang, seeing how beautiful Qianqian is, cheats San Wan of a large sum of money and instigates Qianqian to elope with him.

The tub left behind by Zhigang is picked up by the Weijie, the eldest son of the lazy couple Robert and Mary. Thereafter, it ends up with Auntie Auto, and then Lin Bang's family.

Lin Bang's wife Nancy runs a shrine and they have two daughters. Their eldest daughter Xiuzhen, a university student, is pretty, intelligent, and carries a torch for Su Dingyi, a handsome and stylish young man from a wealthy family. But Lin Bang is actually her stepfather and so her biological father does not recognise her as his daughter. To get closer to him, she hides the fact that she is from a poor family, so that she will not feel ashamed of her parents.

Their younger daughter Xiuming is not as intelligent as her elder sister. After finishing her 'N' levels, she operates a stall at a night market. She has grown up among the lower social levels and feels that even though people of this class are not wealthy and have no social status to speak of, they can etch an honest living and give support to one another. Hence, she does not mind when people find out that she lives in a rented flat, has a father who is a taxi driver by day and getai singer by night and a mother who gets up to dodgy things at the temple. Xiuming's honest and open nature attracts Dingyi and he begins to woo her. However his attempts often end in comedic failure or is misinterpreted by Xiuming.

Uncle Kopi's son, a professor, discovers that a Chinese ceramics auction by Sotheby's includes a particular piece named 'Nine Dragon Tub'. This is a precious treasure from the palace dating back to the year of Qing Kang and is valued at US$5,000,000. He suddenly remembers that there is a tub just like that in their home and it might just turn out to be that very same tub! Thus, he secretly tries to gain possession of it for himself. Unfortunately, the tub has been passed around and its whereabouts is unknown. Very quickly, news of the 'Nine Dragon Tub' spreads far and wide. Everyone is desperately trying to locate the tub...

The 'treasure' has in fact ended up with Lin Bang who is currently using it as a spa tub. He soaks himself in warm water in the tub every day to ease aches and pains. When Nancy finds out the true value of this tub, she decides to keep it a secret and sell the tub away quietly. This way, she will be able to get the family out of their rented flat and they will become wealthy folks. Will this plan of hers succeed?

== Production ==
- One of the cast member of this drama, Jimmy Nah, also known as MC King, died during the period of filming for this drama serial. Thus, he only filmed 80% of the screentime from the requirement of his role. The remaining 20% of his role was filmed by a replacement. However, his face was edited into the replacement actor. Since he died during the period of filming, this was the last show/drama serial he was in.

== Accolades ==
| Year | Ceremony | Award | Nominee | Result | Ref |
|---|---|---|---|---|---|
| 2008 | Star Awards | Best Actor | Huang Wenyong | Nominated | |
| 2008 | Star Awards | Best Actress | Chen Liping | Nominated | |
| 2008 | Star Awards | Young Talent Award | Justin Peng 彭修轩 | Nominated | |
| 2008 | Star Awards | Best Drama Serial | —N/a | Nominated | |
| 2008 | Star Awards | Best Theme Song | "屋檐" | Nominated | |
| 2008 | Star Awards | Top 10 Highest Viewership Local Dramas in 2008 Award 十大最高收视率 | —N/a | Won Highly Commended | |
| 2008 | Asian Television Awards | Best Actor | Huang Wenyong | Nominated | |
| 2008 | Asian Television Awards | Best Actress | Patricia Mok | Nominated | |

== Viewership rating and reception ==
Since the debut of this series, it has generated largely positive reviews from critics. This drama serial is ranked the third Highest Viewership Drama for Year 2008, behind The Little Nyonya and Nanny Daddy.

| Week | Episode | Date | Percentage of Population (%) |
|---|---|---|---|
| Week 1 | Ep 1 to Ep 5 | 25 February 2008 to 29 February 2008 | 18.7% |
| Week 2 | Ep 6 to Ep 10 | 3 March 2008 to 7 March 2008 | 18.1% |
| Week 3 | Ep 11 to Ep 15 | 10 March 2008 to 14 March 2008 | 18.7% |
| Week 4 | Ep 16 to Ep 20 | 17 March 2008 to 21 March 2008 | 19.4% |
| Week 5 | Ep 21 to Ep 25 | 24 March 2008 to 28 March 2008 | 20.4% |
| Week 6 | Ep 26 to Ep 30 | 31 March 2008 to 4 April 2008 | 21.5% |
