= Destiny in Her Hands =

Malaysian/Singaporean television series

- 断掌的女人
- Genre: Temptations; Drama
- Starring: Jeanette Aw; Steve Yap
- Opening theme: 斷掌 by 涂晓琴
- Ending theme: 斷掌 by 涂晓琴
- Countries of origin: Malaysia; Singapore
- Original language: Mandarin
- No. of episodes: 30

Production
- Production locations: Klang Valley, Penang, Johor Bahru
- Running time: 60 minutes (approx.)

Original release
- Network: ntv7 (Malaysia); Mediacorp Channel 8 (Singapore)
- Release: 9 June – 1 August 2011

Related
- The Seeds of Life; The Quarters

Destiny in Her Hands (断掌的女人) is a Malaysian/Singaporean television drama series and the 21st co-production of MediaCorp TV and ntv7. It is also the first production by MediaCorp Studios Malaysia Sdn Bhd. It stars Jeanette Aw, Steve Yap & Ernest Chong as casts of this series. The ntv7 anniversary blockbuster was scheduled to air from every Monday to Thursday, at 10:00pm on Malaysia's ntv7. This drama was also broadcast on Mediacorp Channel 8 from April 2012, at 7pm every weeknight.

This is the 17th Mediacorp drama to be filmed in 16:9 HDTV although being aired in 4:3 SDTV on ntv7.

== Synopsis ==
This is a story about a lady who was born with broken lines on both her palms. It seems according to Chinese cultural beliefs, if a person is born with broken lines on his/her palms, especially if the person is a female, she would face a life of extreme hardship and bad luck.

The story begins with the main character Luo Jin Yu (Jeanette Aw) was born to a fried mee hoon seller mother and a gambling addict father. She was born at the backstage of a Cantonese opera travelling troupe that was coincidentally in town for a performance. Jin Yu's mother was devastated to find out her firstborn daughter was born with broken lines on both of her palms. She had wanted to abandon Jin Yu but an opera performer who found her at the backstage had advised her to instead bring up her daughter as best as she could.

Life proved to be incredibly a long and hard journey for Jin Yu as she experienced indescribable hardships and challenges in life right into her adult life. Adding more misery to her life were the births of her three younger brothers and one younger sister, where her mother favoured them over her as the eldest child in the family.

Jin Yu was denied the basic right to education although she was an above average and conscientious student, she had to stop schooling and was forced to work in a factory at the age of 15 to support her family due severe poverty. After she married a colleague working at the same factory, she later discovered that she has the talent for writing and she decided to venture into it to earn extra income to support herself and her family. However, her husband was never supportive of her ventures to keep their family financially afloat.

Jin Yu's husband was a womaniser and also hot-tempered and abusive towards her and their children, a mentally-challenged son and a daughter, which led Jin Yu to become independent to achieve her ambition to be a famous script writer and the best possible wife and mother to her husband children. However, there was a time that Jin Yu even contemplated suicide because she believed the broken lines on both of her palms meant that she be destined to fail in her life.

A prolific journalist Pan Li Hua, who later became her best friend, advised her that her life is still worth living, and suicide would not solve the problems she was facing in life. Jin Yu then decided from then on to be in control of the direction her life would take but not at the expense of her family and ambition. She finally managed to take control of the destiny of her life but not without facing some of the most horrendous challenges life has imposed on her. Jin Yu's story ends as how it has begun, i.e. at a Cantonese opera travelling troupe stage but this time she was married to a man as her second husband who shared her passion for script writing and performing in the Cantonese opera.

== Cast ==
- Jeanette Aw as Luo Jin Yu
- Steve Yap as Wang De Cheng
- Ernest Chong as Wang Jie Ming
- Joey Leong as Wang Shan Shan
- Jess Teong as Li Xiu Zhi
- Hong Guo Rui as Luo Jin Hua
- Mers Sheng as Luo Jin Liang
- Monday Kang as Luo Jin Feng
- Moo Yan Yee as Luo Yin Yu
- Tate Chan as Luo Jin Guang
- Soo Wincci as Hu Hui Ying
