= Love Blossoms II =

- 心花朵朵开 II
- Genre: Modern Drama
- Starring: Zheng Geping; Ivy Lee; Felicia Chin; Zhang Yaodong; Terence Cao; Ya Hui; Chew Chor Meng; Constance Song; Patricia Mok; Rayson Tan
- Opening theme: 完整 by Cavin Soh
- Ending theme: 1) 太习惯 by Cavin Soh; 2) 心花朵朵开 by Cavin Soh; 3) 无可取代 by Cavin Soh; 4) 算数 by Cai Meiyi
- Country of origin: Singapore
- Original language: Chinese
- No. of episodes: 55

Production
- Running time: approx. 45 minutes per episode

Original release
- Network: MediaCorp TV Channel 8
- Release: 2 December 2008 – 9 February 2009

Related
- Love Blossoms; Holland V Double Happiness; Double Happiness II; Portrait of Home; 118; 118 II; 118 Reunion

Love Blossoms II (Chinese: 心花朵朵开 II) is the second part of the long-running Chinese drama produced by Singapore's free-to-air channel, MediaCorp Channel 8. It stars Constance Song, Ivy Lee, Felicia Chin, Zhang Yaodong, Terence Cao, Zheng Geping, Ya Hui, Patricia Mok, Rayson Tan & Chew Chor Meng as the casts of the series. It is the sequel of Love Blossoms. It is shown on weekdays at 7pm.

Part 1 consisted of 58 episodes, while Part 2 had 55 episodes. From 2 January 2009, two episodes were aired in a two-hour slot on Fridays from 1900 hours to 2100 hours.

== Plot ==
=== Tao family ===
Tao Dashun (Chen Shucheng) is unable to bask in family bliss, although Tao Linglan (Constance Song) and Wenhao (Terence Cao) are reunited with the family. Wenhao is unable to assimilate into the family as he feels that Dashun acknowledged him only because his mother has died. Lu Gua's (Chen Tianwen)'s greed and laziness irks Haitong (Felicia Chin) and they get into frequent confrontations because of Tao Nursery.

When Wenzhu's (Ya Hui)'s condition improves after rest. She decides to further her studies abroad. Wenhao takes the opportunity to announce that he has to go to Australia to settle his mother's estate. With his children leaving him one by one, Dashun feels a sense of loss especially when Zijing is missing.

Without Daji (Zhang Yaodong) helping her, Haitong has to manage Tao Garden and E28, the hamper-selling branch of Tao Garden, on her own. Her ex-boyfriend Zipeng (Adam Chen) tries to rekindle their relationship and although Haitong makes it clear that she is not interested, Zipeng joins E28 on the pretext that he is protecting Haitong from Lu Gua's bullying.

When Daji returns, he is not pleased with Zipeng's presence but respects Haitong's arrangement.

Wenhao returns from Australia feeling that his parents had not genuinely loved him. He suggests that Dashun mortgage his house to buy Tao Garden for him. Dashun is reluctant and Wenhao decides to leave home.

Daji's aunt Daisy (Aileen Tan) returns to Singapore after leaving from her job in the United States of America. She does not get along well with Haitong due to her previous cohabitation with Zipeng.

Before Linglan's daughter Yiling (Chen Chuxuan) leaves for farther studies in Australia, Lu Gua sneaks into her room and tries to start sexual activities with her. In a fit of anger, Linglan drives Lu Gua away.

Zipeng loses all his possessions in the stock market and is desperate for money. With Lu Gua's help, he kidnaps Haitong, but when her claustrophobia acts up, he releases her without demanding a ransom. When he is chased by the police, he commits suicide, slitting his throat.

After the incident with Lu Gua, Yiling's behaviour goes from bad to worse. At a party, her cocktail was drugged, and she was pictured nude. She beat the boy who had raped her to a pulp.

Linglan wants to leave the country with Yiling, but Dashun chides her, advising her to turn her in to the police. Linglan is saddened but agrees with Dashun that it is the best decision.

Haitong and Daji eventually marry despite the tough test their relationship went through. Haitong realizes that she has a heart ailment when she is pregnant and faces the possibility of an abortion.

Wenhao contracts liver cirrhosis which might develop into liver failure. When Dashun donates part of his liver to him, Wenhao realises that Dashun loves him after all.

=== Yun family ===
Zijing (Ivy Lee) was in a coma for three months after her accident. When she regains consciousness, she realizes that she has been saved by Wang Zhongkun (Chew Chor Meng). Zijing is desolate, not knowing what the future holds for her and is reluctant to return home in an undignified state. Zhongkun, a victim of a gambling addiction, decides to help her re-establish her confidence.

When Zijing and Kaiwang (Zheng Geping) meet again, he pleads for a reunion. Zijing does not want to live in an insecure future. Kaiwang does not understand and, coupled with Caixia's (Patricia Mok) instigation, misunderstands that Zijing and Zhongkun are on intimate terms. Their matrimonial harmony is at stake.

Pressured by Caixia's tight scrutiny, Qingxiong (Rayson Tan) invests his savings in a gem mine and is cheated. He runs off, abandoning his family and business.

With her husband leaving behind massive debts, Caixia turns to her family for help. Little did she know that she had angered them one time too many. They refuse to help her, and Caixia is left to work for her own food and lodging.

Kaiwang works hard to clear his financial problems hoping to attain Zijing's approval. Coincidentally, Zhongkun is diagnosed with Spinocerebellar ataxia, a terminal illness. Zijing is at a loss on whether to return to Kaiwang or stay to look after Zhongkun.

Suddenly, Qingxiong returns and pleads for his wife's forgiveness. Jason pleads along but never gives up. He tricks Caixia into coming into his house and Caixia accepts him.

Zijing decides the go overseas with Zhongkun. Kaiwang is extremely sad but accepts her decision. However, Feifei secretly pleads Zhongkun not to take Zijing away from her. Zhongkun is devastated when Feifei tells him it is better for him to suffer rather than the whole Yun family.

Zhongkun leaves his home secretly, without Zijing's knowledge, the next day. He settles down in a nursing home where he is reconciled with Zhonghui, who tells him that he was now part of their family. Kaiwang meets with Zhongkun and arranges for Zijing to send him and Zhongmin off to the airport.

Zijing decides to return to Kaiwang on the advice of Dashun, Linglan, Haitong and Daji. She packed her bags and quietly returned to Kaiwang's flat, not knowing that a surprise party had been planned for her.

After all they have gone through, Caixia and Qingxiong have changed for the better. They are forgiven by Kaiwang, Zijing and Baozuan. Not long after, Zijing is found to be pregnant. She gives birth to twin boys, to the delight of Kaiwang and Baozuan.

=== Pan family ===
Jiaqi (Yvonne Lim) is Kaiwang's new neighbour and lives with her father Old Peter (Richard Low) and brother Jiaqiang (Cavin Soh). Jiaqiang falls in love with Erbo (Priscelia Chan) and constantly teams up with his father to tease Caixia, who bullies Erbo frequently.

Jiaqi's friend Fan Fan (Vivian Lai) co-owns a bakery with Jiaqi and falls in love with Wenhao, who turns out to be her ex-classmate. Old Peter 'approves' of Wenhao when he first sees him and takes advantage of Erbo and Jiaqiang's wedding to bring he and Jiaqi closer.

After Erbo and Jiaqiang come back from their honeymoon, Old Peter is found to have senile dementia. Baozuan is employed to take care of Old Peter when Jiaqiang and Jiaqi are at work.

While tidying up Old Peter's room, Jiaqi finds evidence that she is not Old Peter's real daughter. Her real father turns up to be Wang Fa (Hong Guorui), the father of Zhigang (Ben Yeo), Wenzhu's ex-boyfriend.

When Wenhao first suggested that Wang Fa could be frauding, Jiaqi is displeased. However, after secretly removing a strand of his hair from his flat and sending it for DNA testing, she finds that Wenhao was right about Wang Fa. She reports Wang Fa to the police for fraud.

Jiaqi and Wenhao fall in love and marry. Fan Fan is not best pleased but accepts that Wenhao and Jiaqi love each other.

=== Overall ===
Lu Gua was arrested by the police when he attempted to demand and extort money from Linglan and the Tao family. He was sentenced to death for drug trafficking, rape, attempted murder and possession of gay pornographic materials (obscenity). Linglan is happy that she and Yiling were rid of him at last.

Far away in Switzerland, Zhongkun, racked with atrophy, held up a drawing of Zijing he had made earlier, before he had learnt of his disease. He could only manage to hold it upside down. He wept as he thought of Zijing and her happy family many miles away back in Singapore.

On Christmas Day, the Tao, Yun and Pan families gather at Dashun's house for a celebration. Yiling had been released from prison and Wenzhu was back with a new boyfriend. There were four babies present, Kaiwang and Zijing's twins, Haitong and Daji's son and Jiaqiang and Erbo's daughter Ziqing. When they were about to toast to the unity of their families, Wenhao announces that Jiaqi was pregnant. The whole house was full of joy as love blossomed among them.

== Cast ==
=== Tao Family ===
Actor	Character(s)
Chen Shucheng 陈澍城	Tao Dashun
Ivy Lee 李锦梅	Tao Zijing
Felicia Chin 陈凤玲	Tao Haitong
Constance Song 宋怡霏	Tao Linglan
Ya Hui 雅慧	Tao Wenzhu
Terence Cao 曹国辉	Yu Wenhao

=== Yun Family ===
Actor	Character(s)
Patricia Mok 莫小玲	Big Mouthed Witch; Yun Caixia
Rayson Tan 陈泰銘	Kang Qingxiong
Jin Yinji 金银姬	Su Bao Zuan
Zheng Geping 郑各评	Yun Kaiwang
Ng Xin Yi 黄馨仪	Yun Feifei

=== Pan Family ===
Actor	Character(s)
Yvonne Lim 林湘萍	Pan Jiaqi 潘佳琦
Richard Low 刘谦益	Peter Pan; Old Peter
Cavin Soh 苏梽诚	Young Peter
Priscelia Chan 曾诗梅	Erbo

=== Yu Family ===
Actor	Character(s)
Eelyn Kok 郭蕙雯	Yu Meiwei
Huang Wenyong 黃文永	Yu Dong Cheng
Lin Meijiao 林梅娇	Pan Qiulian

=== Wang Family ===
Actor	Character(s)
Chew Chor Meng 周初明	Wang Zhongkun
Wang Yuqing 王昱清	Wang Zhonghui (Anthony)
Zhang Wei	Wang Junling
Evelyn Tan	Wang Zhongmin
Melody Chen	Amy
Hong Guorui	Wang Fa

=== Other Casts ===
Actor	Character(s)
Aileen Tan 陈丽贞	Daisy Ma
Adam Chen 詹金泉	Guo Zipeng
Vivian Lai 赖怡伶	Fan Fan
Zhang Yaodong 张耀栋	Machi Ma Daji
Chen Tianwen 陈天文	Lu Gua

=== Minor characters ===
Actor	Character(s)
Chen Huihui	Nancy
Renfred Ng	Zhiyang

== Music ==
Song title	Performer	Type of Song
完整	Cavin Soh	Theme Song
太习惯	Cavin Soh	Sub Theme Song
心花朵朵开	Cavin Soh	Sub Theme Song
无可取代	Cavin Soh	Sub Theme Song
算数	Cai Meiyi	Sub Theme Song

== Production ==
In the midst of filming, the actor playing Wang Zhongkun, Chew Chor Meng, was diagnosed with Kennedy's disease, causing him to limp. On Dec 19, 2008, he confirmed this during a church event, admitting that he had hid his disease from the public since September 2008.

== Accolades ==
Organisation	Year	Category	Nominee(s)	Result	Ref
Star Awards	2010	Young Talent Award	Ng Xin Yi 黄馨仪	Nominated	
Star Awards	2010	Favourite Female Character	Felicia Chin	Nominated	
Star Awards	2010	Unforgettable Villain	Chen Tianwen	Nominated	
Star Awards	2010	Unforgettable Villain	Patricia Mok	Nominated	
