= Let's Eat! (film) =

- 开饭啦!
- Directed by: Chapman To
- Written by: Lai Chaing Ming; Ang Siew Hoong
- Produced by: Lim Teck; Adrian Teh
- Starring: Chapman To; Aimee Chan; Lo Hoi-pang; Patricia Mok; C-Kwan; Tommy Kuan; Daphne Low
- Production companies: Asia Tropical Films; Clover Films
- Distributed by: Golden Screen (Malaysia); Cathay (Singapore); Clover Films (International)
- Release dates: 4 February 2016 (Malaysia); 5 February 2016 (Singapore)
- Running time: 96 minutes
- Countries: Malaysia; Singapore
- Languages: Cantonese; Mandarin
- Budget: US$1.3 million
- Box office: US$489,846

Let's Eat! (Chinese: 开饭啦!) is a 2016 Malaysian-Singaporean Chinese New Year comedy film directed by Chapman To in his directorial debut. It stars To as a Chinese traditional chef who comes into conflict with the restaurant owner's daughter portrayed by Aimee Chan. It was released on 4 February 2016 in Malaysia and in Singapore the next day on 5 February 2016, grossing a total of US$489,846 in both territories.

== Plot ==
A Chinese traditional chef named Dai Hung (Chapman To) comes into conflict with the restaurant owner's daughter named Rosemary (Aimee Chan) when she seeks to modernize the restaurant and reduce costs.

== Cast ==
- Chapman To as Dai Hung
- Aimee Chan as Rosemary
- Lo Hoi-pang as Ah Yong
- Patricia Mok
- Henry Thia
- C-Kwan
- Tommy Kuan
- Daphne Low
- Mark Lee appears as himself as the host of the cooking competition.

== Production ==
To had previously worked with the producers on King of Mahjong, and they requested that he direct their next film. Lim, one of the film's producers, said that To was impressed with the local talent after appearing in The Wedding Diary 1&2 and decided to make his next film in Singapore and Malaysia. Production began on 8 September 2015 in Kuala Lumpur and Singapore. To said he was inspired by local dishes, such as Hainanese Chicken Rice.

== Release ==
Let's Eat was released in Malaysia on 4 February 2016 and in Singapore the next day. It grossed US$457,793 in Malaysia and $32,053 in Singapore; the total gross was $489,846.

== Reception ==
Boon Chan of The Straits Times rated it 2.5/5 stars and said that the dubbing from Cantonese to Mandarin for the Singaporean release ruined the film's humour. Lisa Twang of The New Paper rated it 3/5 stars and compared it to The God of Cookery, which she said it does not match. Jessica Lin of AsiaOne rated it 2/5 stars and said the film does not feature enough local Malaysian and Singaporean content.
