= Poetic Justice (TV series) =

Singaporean drama television series

- Publicity poster
- 微笑正义
- Genre: Romance; Mystery; Media
- Created by: 许丽雯; Paul Yuen 袁树伟
- Directed by: 黄芬菲 郭慧绮 罗温温
- Starring: Rui En; Dai Xiangyu; Rebecca Lim; Desmond Tan
- Opening theme: 不够勇敢 by Della Ding Dang
- Ending theme: 好难得 by Della Ding Dang 一个人不可能 by Della Ding Dang 奇异果 by Della Ding Dang
- Country of origin: Singapore
- Original language: Chinese
- No. of episodes: 20

Production
- Producer: Paul Yuen 袁树伟
- Running time: 1 hour (with commercials)

Original release
- Network: MediaCorp Channel 8
- Release: 11 September – 8 October 2012

Poetic Justice (Chinese: 微笑正义) is a Singaporean Chinese-language drama television series. It depicts the lives of a group of people doing investigative journalism, and was telecasted on Singapore's free-to-air channel, MediaCorp Channel 8. It stars Rui En, Dai Xiangyu, Rebecca Lim & Desmond Tan as the casts of the series. It was broadcast on MediaCorp Channel 8 from 11 September 2012 to 8 October 2012. This drama serial consists of 20 episodes, and was screened on every weekday night at 9:00 pm.

Unlike most locally produced series about crime, this series departs from the traditional police procedural style and focuses more on investigative journalism and the media.

== Story ==
The plot revolves around a group of young professionals involved in investigative journalism. Two journalists team up with a wealthy businessman and a lawyer to help solve cases for those in need. As they investigate further, they uncover more secrets and dark truths behind some of the crimes.

== Cast ==
=== Main cast ===
- Rui En as Liu Yanzhi 刘言之:
  A reporter and anchorwoman at Real TV.
- Dai Xiangyu as Fang Zhengye:
  A reporter at Real TV.
- Rebecca Lim as Feng Luoling 冯洛凌:
  A reporter and anchorwoman at Real TV.
- Desmond Tan as Tang Zhisheng 唐智胜:
  A lawyer and legal consultant of Real TV

=== Supporting cast ===
Cast	Role	Description
Sora Ma 马艺瑄	Zhong Ruiyao 钟芮瑶	Reporter at Real TV, later Anchorwoman; In love with Zhisheng; Zhisheng's wife in the end
Guo Liang 郭亮	Ouyang Qiu	Yanzhi, Zhengye, Luoling, Zhisheng, Ruiyao and Benny's boss
Adam Chen 詹金泉	Benny	Reporter at Real TV
Ye Limei	Yuri	
Lieu Yanxi 刘彦希	Liu Qingzi	Yanzhi's niece Parents died when she was young Raised by Yanzhi
Yuan Shuai 袁帅	Lin Zhonglun 林仲伦	Ex-Reporter at Real TV; Disappeared 2 years ago Lived in Macau after his disappearance Held evidence on Renhou embezzling his company's funds
Zhu Houren 朱厚任	Fang Renhou 方任厚	Zhengye's father Caused Zhonglun's disappearance
Hong Huifang 洪慧芳	Lin Huifang 林慧芳	
Priscelia Chan 曾诗梅	Tammy	Yanzhi's best friend Eugene's girlfriend
Ng Hui 黄慧	Sunny	
Jeffrey Xu 徐鸣杰	Paul	
Chen Tianwen 陈天文	Huang-Ge 煌哥	Hired by Renhou to chase Zhonglun out of Singapore; Stabbed Yanzhi in episode 1 (prologue) and 18

=== Cameo appearance ===
Cast	Role	Description
Shane Pow 包勋评	Alex	Hit an elderly woman on the road
Yao Wenlong 姚彣隆	Ah De 阿徳	Mr Li's chauffeur Bribed to become Alex's scapegoat
Richard Low 刘谦益	Mr Li	Alex's father
Shine Koh	Wendy	Ah De's wife
Ben Yeo 杨志龙	Adam	Zhengye's friend Owner of a restaurant Staged a robbery to frame Weixiong so as to fire him
Desmond Sim	Hong Weixiong	Kexin's father Ex-convict
Oh Ling En	Hong Kexin	Qingzi's friend
Jerry Yeo 杨伟烈	He Youren	Jiale's husband
Tracy Lee 李美玲	Sun Jiale	Actress; Youren's wife Wanted to divorce Youren to protect him
May Phua 潘淑钦	Aileen	Has bipolar disorder
Zheng Geping 郑各评	David	Officer of the Singapore Police Force; Derek's father Fiona's husband
Pan Lingling 潘玲玲	Fiona	Derek's mother David's wife Zhisheng's client
Aloysius Pang 冯伟衷	Derek	David and Fiona's son Injured Xiaohei in defence
Xu Bin 徐彬	Xiaohei	Attacked Derek but got himself injured in the process
Louis C. Hillyard	Roy	
Paige Chua 蔡琦慧	Liang Huiqin	Tingting's elder sister
Adeline Lim	Liang Tingting	Huiqin's younger sister Molested by her teacher a year ago
Henry Thia 程旭辉	Gao Feng	Millionaire
Teo Ser Li	Flora	Gao Feng's third wife Had an affair with the lawyer she hired
Sheila Tan	Joey	Gao Feng's second wife Embezzled Gao Feng's company's funds
Zen Chong 章证翔	Eugene	Tammy's boyfriend Zhengye's cousin Died from a car accident in Macau
Brandon Wong 黄炯耀	Eric	

== Production ==
Filming for Poetic Justice took place from June to August 2012. This is the first show where Rui En and Dai Xiangyu collaborate as the main leads in a television drama.

Originally, this television drama was entitled Fair? Unfair? in English.

== Awards and nominations ==
Year	Award	Category	Recipient(s)	Result	Ref
2013	Star Awards	Young Talent Award	Lieu Yan Xi 刘彦希	Nominated	
2013	Star Awards	Best Director	Wong Foong Hwee 黄芬菲	Nominated	
2013	Star Awards	Best Drama Cameraman	Tommy Lee Heng Soon	Nominated	
2013	Star Awards	Best Costume & Image Design	Justin Lee	Nominated	
2013	Star Awards	Top Rated Drama Serial 2012	—N/a	Nominated	
2013	Star Awards	Best Music & Sound Design	Thong Meng Sun	Nominated	
2013	Star Awards	Best Music & Sound Design	Matthew Teng	Nominated	
2013	Star Awards	Favourite Female Character	Rebecca Lim	Nominated	
2013	Star Awards	Favourite Female Character	Rui En	Won	
2013	Star Awards	Best Actor	Dai Xiangyu	Nominated	
2013	Star Awards	Best Drama Serial	—N/a	Nominated	

== See also ==
- List of programmes broadcast by Mediacorp Channel 8
- List of Poetic Justice episodes
