= Love Blossoms =

- 心花朵朵开
- Genre: Modern Comedic Drama
- Created by: Chen Sew Koon 陈秀群; Seah Choon Guan 谢俊源
- Starring: Chen Shucheng; Constance Song; Ivy Lee; Felicia Chin; Zhang Yaodong; Terence Cao; Zheng Geping; Ya Hui; Patricia Mok; Rayson Tan
- Opening theme: 心花朵朵开 by Cavin Soh
- Ending theme: 1) 算数 by Cai Meiyi; 2) 无可取代 by Cavin Soh
- Country of origin: Singapore
- Original language: Chinese
- No. of episodes: 58

Production
- Producer: Winnie Wong (王尤红）
- Running time: approx. 45 minutes per episode

Original release
- Network: MediaCorp TV Channel 8
- Release: 28 May – 15 August 2008

Related
- Love Blossoms II; Holland V Double Happiness; Double Happiness II; Portrait of Home; 118; 118 II; 118 Reunion

Love Blossoms (Chinese: 心花朵朵开) was the long-running drama produced by Singapore's free-to-air channel, MediaCorp TV Channel 8. Part 1 was aired from 28 May 2008 to 15 August 2008, and consisted of 58 episodes. It is shown on weekdays at 7pm. It stars Chen Shucheng, Constance Song, Ivy Lee, Felicia Chin, Zhang Yaodong, Terence Cao, Zheng Geping, Ya Hui, Patricia Mok & Rayson Tan in this series.

== Plot ==
=== Guilt of the Father ===
Widower Tao Dashun (Chen Shucheng) runs a floral nursery business Tao Garden . He has four daughters; however, he is not expressive with his affections and his daughters become very distant from him as they grow up.

Dashun has been estranged from his eldest daughter Tao Linglan (Constance Song) ever since he personally sent her to a drug rehabilitation centre when she was 18. The rebellious Linglan did not return home after her release. She gave birth to a daughter named Tao Yiling (Chen Chuxuan), and after her boyfriend abandoned her, both began living with a bookie named Lu Gua (Chen Tianwen), who often looks for opportunities to violate Yiling.

Yiling becomes good friends with her maternal grandfather Dashun by coincidence and through this, Linglan is reunited with her father Dashun. Linglan is indifferent to Dashun's good intentions to make things up to her. Lu Gua on the other hand takes advantage of Dashun's guilt to reap benefits out of him.

=== Gambling woes ===
Dashun's second daughter Tao Zijing (Ivy Lee) is married to a flower vendor, Yun Kaiwang (Zheng Geping), and they have a daughter, Yun Feifei (Grace Ng). Due to financial constraints, she has decided not to try for a son – a decision that places her at odds with her mother-in-law named Su Baozuan (Jin Yinji). Kaiwang's younger sister Yun Caixia (Patricia Mok) moves back home with her husband Kang Qingxiong (Rayson Tan) when his business fails and he goes bankrupt. As Caixia is not on cordial terms with Zijing, this further fuels the existing bad blood with her mother-in-law.

Qingxiong instigates Kaiwang to get a second wife overseas to bear him a son. Kaiwang is tempted and his indecisiveness causes Zijing to leaves home. While trying to win her back, Kaiwang discovers that she is an incorrigible gambler and even owes huge debts to loan-sharks. In a fit of anger, Kaiwang suggests a divorce and insisted that she quit her habit before reuniting with him.

=== The cheats and the cheatings ===
Qingxiong's second wife Ruan Erbo (Priscelia Chan) arrives from Vietnam to look for him. He forces Kaiwang to be his scapegoat and the latter reluctantly agrees to protect his sister's marriage. However, Erbo falls in love with Kaiwang and Zijing misunderstands that Kaiwang has really taken a second wife. She goes to Malacca to nurse her bruised feelings. Kaiwang follows in pursuit and an opportunity to reunite is interrupted by an accident which leaves Zijing unconscious. Thinking that Zijing has given up on him for good, Kaiwang returns to Singapore.

Qingxiong uses Kaiwang's name to operate a matchmaking agency. With that as a front, Qingxiong encourages his clients to source for second wives overseas and even organizes lustful escapades for his male clients. Kaiwang, too distracted and depressed with his family problems, leaves the business in Qingxiong's care. Unbeknownst to him, what Qingxiong is doing is actually a ticking time bomb waiting to explode.

=== Flower Nursery Fight ===
Dashun's third daughter Tao Haitong (Felicia Chin) is an aggressively enterprising and achievement-oriented young woman who runs a hamper cum floral business with her boyfriend, Guo Zipeng (Adam Chen).

Dashun sells his nursery to an American-born Chinese man named Ma Daji (Zhang Yaodong), to clear Zijing's gambling debts. Knowing nothing about nursery operation, he is manipulated by Haitong into signing a contract which not only provides flowers to her company at a low price but also hires Dashun at an exorbitant salary. Daji is helpless when he realizes that he has been taken advantage of.

When Haitong discovers that Zipeng is two-timing her, she gives up the relationship and business to return to the nursery. Her determination and enthusiasm change Daji's perception of her. As the nursery's business grows under their cooperation, so do their affections for each other. Daji's parents decide to venture into the China market and suggest that he sell off the nursery to join them in their business. Daji hopes that Haitong would ask him to stay, but she does not want to use their relationship to tie Daji down. Dejected, Daji leaves for China.

=== Self-referencing of Mediacorp ===
Dashun's youngest daughter Tao Wenzhu (Ya Hui) is an undergraduate with countless suitors, but she only has eyes for Daji. Talent-scouted by Mediacorp to act in a drama, she inadvertently offends a popular actress named Xu Yanning (May Phua), who makes things difficult for her. Wenzhu's conflict with Yanning and her close friendship with image consultant Wang Zhigang (Ben Yeo) become a talking point for the media. Worried that her public image will be affected, Wenzhu distants herself from Zhigang, unaware that he has already fallen in love with her. When the media brands him as a sissy and even gay, Wenzhu breaks off their friendship for the sake of her career.

Dashun realizes he also has a son, Wenhao (Terence Cao), from his affair with Liang Miaochang (Hong Huifang) 20 years ago. Miaochang eventually married Yu Dongcheng (Huang Wenyong) and lied that Wenhao is her foster son. Both have a daughter, Meiwei (Eelyn Kok). Unhappy with her marriage, Miaochang furthers her studies overseas, leaving Wenhao and Meiwei in Dongcheng's care. When Miaochang returns and realizes that Wenhao has not been well taken care of by Dongcheng, she decides to acknowledge Wenhao and bring him back to Australia.

Lu Gua's henchmen come to seek revenge on Wenhao, injuring Wenzhu accidentally. The injury leaves her with a clot in her brain which causes her severe headaches and affecting her acting career greatly. The once-cheerful girl retreats into seclusion.

=== The path ahead ===
Miaochang is killed in a road accident and her death throws Wenhao into a stage of despair. Dashun could not bear to see his son like that and decides to come clean about his relationship with him. He announces his decision to acknowledge Wenhao and his intention to take care of Linglan's family. Dashun believes that the family reunion will be a new beginning but little does he realise that Wenhao and the vindictive Linglan's return will pose unimaginable challenges to his life and to Tao Garden...

(To be continued in Season 2)

(Source: Channel 8 official website)

== Cast ==
=== Tao Family ===
Actor	Character(s)
Chen Shucheng 陈澍城	Tao Dashun
Ivy Lee 李锦梅	Tao Zijing
Felicia Chin 陈凤玲 (credited as Chen Jing Xuan 陈靓瑄)	Tao Haitong
Constance Song 宋怡霏	Tao Linglan
Ya Hui 雅慧	Tao Wenzhu
Terence Cao 曹国辉	Yu Wenhao

=== Yun Family ===
Actor	Character(s)
Patricia Mok 莫小玲	Yun Caixia
Rayson Tan 陈泰銘	Kang Qingxiong
Jin Yinji 金银姬	Su Bao Zuan
Zheng Geping 郑各评	Yun Kaiwang
Ng Xin Yi 黄馨仪	Yun Feifei
Priscelia Chan 曾诗梅	Erbo

== Music ==
Song title	Performer	Type of Song
心花朵朵开	Cavin Soh	Theme Song
算数	Cai Meiyi 蔡美仪	Sub Theme Song
无可取代	Cavin Soh 苏梽诚	Sub Theme Song

== Production ==
Part 1 was initially scheduled to consist of 55 episodes, but it was extended to 58 episodes so as to fill the week up.

== Awards and nominations ==
The series was nominated for 2 Categories.

=== Star Awards 2009 ===
Award	Nominee	Result
Young Talent Award 青平果奖	Ng Xin Yi 黄馨仪	Nominated
Best Theme Song 最佳主题曲	Cavin Soh 苏梽诚	Nominated
Best Drama Serial 最佳电视剧	—N/a	Nominated
