= Landy Wen =

Taiwanese singer

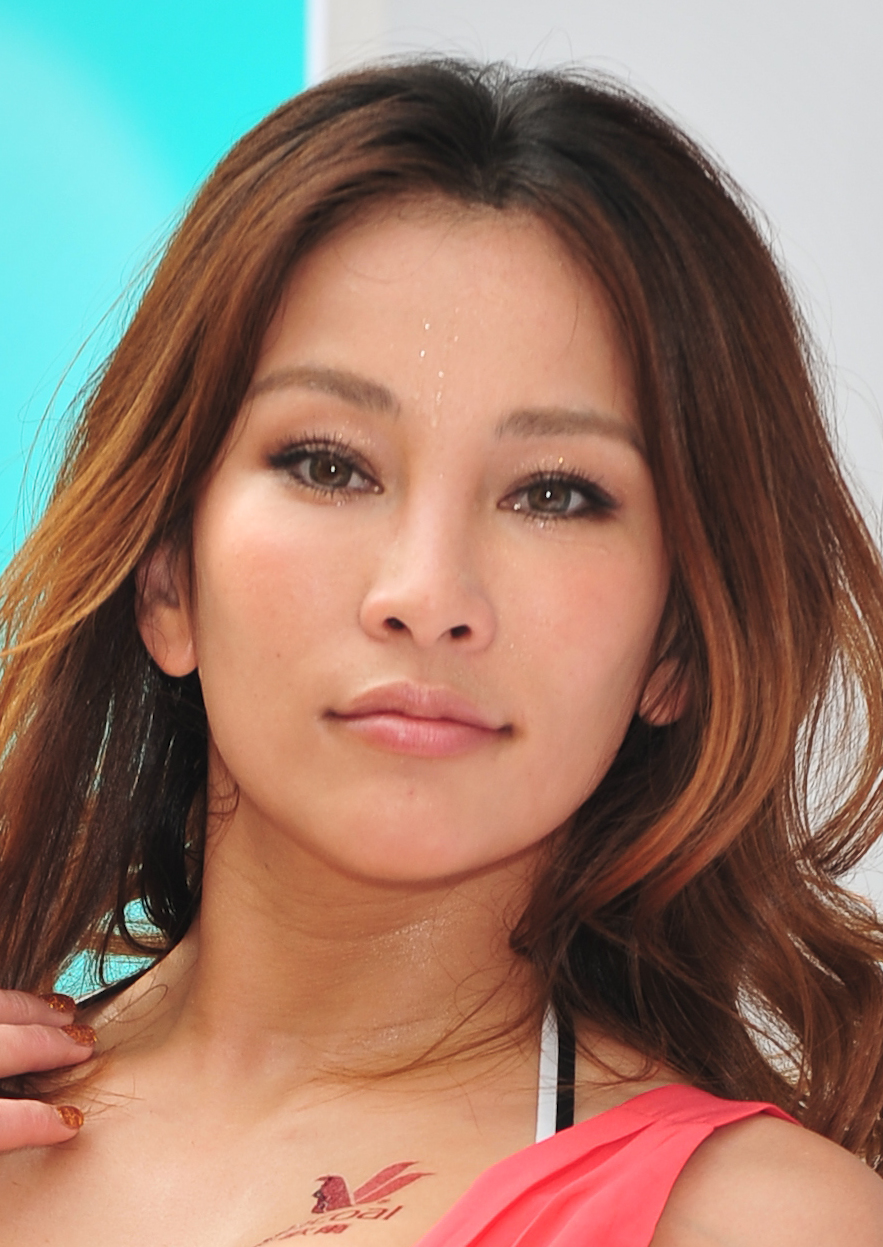
- Landy Wen in 2009
- Born: Yungai Hayung; 16 July 1979 (age 46); Jianshi, Hsinchu, Taiwan
- Occupations: Singer; actress
- Years active: 1998–present
- Musical career
- Genres: Mandopop; R&B
- Labels: Alfa Music International, Inc. (1998–2005); Seed Music (2006–2014); Sun Entertainment Culture (2014–2017); Channy Dynasty Culture (2018–2024); Warner Music Taiwan (2024–present)

Chinese name
- Traditional Chinese: 溫嵐
- Simplified Chinese: 温岚
Transcriptions
Standard Mandarin
- Hanyu Pinyin: Wēn Lán

Yungai Hayung, known professionally as Landy Wen (Chinese: 溫嵐; pinyin: Wēn Lán; Pe̍h-ōe-jī: Un Lâm; Atayal: Yungai Hayung) is a Taiwanese singer.

In 2010, she was cast in a TV drama based on the Bret Easton Ellis novel Less Than Zero, to be set in Taipei.

== Biography ==
Wen was born in the Tayal Llyung Community in Jianshih, Hsinchu. She has lived in Taipei and Taichung. She graduated from Youth Senior High School in Taichung.

In 1997, she competed in the Super Newcomer singing competition in Taipei. The event's host Jacky Wu recognized her talent and signed her to his label Alfa Music International. In 1998, her duet with Wu, Rooftop, gained popularity in the charts and at KTVs.

== Discography ==
- (1999) Sixth Sense (第六感)
- (2001) A Little Wild (有點野)
- (2002) Blue Rain (藍色雨)
- (2004) The Wen Effect (溫式效應)
- (2005) Love Comes Back (New + Best Selection) (愛回溫)
- (2007) Hot Wave (热浪)
- (2008) High Q (EP) (魔力 High Q)
- (2009) Dancing Queen
- (2012) Landing
- (2013) Landy 10th Album (溫嵐 同名概念專輯)
- (2015) Love Myself (愛上自己)
- (2022) Crazy (EP) (瘋)

== Filmography ==
=== Film ===
Year	English title	Original title	Role	Notes
1999	Two and Half Detectives	神探兩個半	Landy	
2011	Warriors of the Rainbow: Seediq Bale	賽德克·巴萊	Mahung Mona	
2012	X3 Trouble	行X踏錯	Beautiful woman	
2017	Take Me to the Moon	帶我去月球	Ruby	Guest
