= KF Seetoh =

Singaporean food critic (born 1962)

- Born: December 1962 (age 63); Singapore
- Other name: Situ Guohui
- Education: St. Joseph's Institution
- Alma mater: Baharuddin Vocational Institute
- Occupations: Food critic, photographer
- Years active: 1983–present

Chinese name
- Traditional Chinese: 司徒國輝
- Simplified Chinese: 司徒国辉
- Hanyu Pinyin: Sītú Guóhuī

Seetoh Kok Fye (born December 1962), better known as KF Seetoh, is a Singaporean food critic and photographer.

The fourth of five children, Seetoh attended St. Joseph's Institution and the Baharuddin Vocational Institute. Beginning in 1983, he worked as a photographer The Straits Times, but left in 1990 to establish his own photographic studio. In 1998, Seetoh and Lim Moh Cher founded Makansutra (a portmanteau combining "makan" and "sutra"), a food guide publisher dedicated to Asian cuisine.

In 2008, Seetoh was awarded the Special Recognition Award by the Singapore Tourism Board.

Inspired by a collaboration with Anthony Bourdain before his death in 2018, Seetoh collaborated with Urbanspace, a company managing food halls in the United States, to open a Singaporean hawker centre near Times Square, New York, in 2022. Urban Hawker ceased operations in July 2026 when the space was sold for redevelopment.

On December 21, 2024, Seetoh's brother Kwok Meng died in a suspected gas explosion at his holiday villa in Italy.
