= Dai Xiangyu =

Chinese actor and model (born 1984)

- Born: Dai Yangtian; 27 December 1984 (age 41); Shaoxing, Zhejiang, China
- Occupations: Actor; model
- Years active: 2007-present
- Spouse: Chen Zihan (m. 2016)

Stage name
- Traditional Chinese: 戴向宇
- Simplified Chinese: 戴向宇
- Hanyu Pinyin: Dài Xiàngyǔ
- Wade–Giles: Tai4 Hsiang4 Yü3

Birth name
- Traditional Chinese: 戴陽天
- Simplified Chinese: 戴阳天
- Hanyu Pinyin: Dài Yángtiān
- Wade–Giles: Tai4 Yang2 T'ien1

Dai Xiangyu (born Dai Yangtian on 27 December 1984) is a Chinese actor and model formerly based in Singapore. He was a full-time Mediacorp artiste from 2007 to 2013.

== Career ==
Dai was born in Shaoxing, Zhejiang province in 1984. He did some modeling in Japan and Shanghai. While in Shanghai he was talent-spotted by MediaCorp and moved to Singapore to sign the contract. His big break came in 2008 when he played Yamamoto Yousuke, a Japanese photographer, in the blockbuster series The Little Nyonya and earned a nomination for the Best Supporting Actor at the 2009 Star Awards. This role was supposed to go to Elvin Ng who was injured just before filming.

Dai acted the first time with Elvin Ng in Together and second time in No Limits. Dai acted his first antagonist role in Breakout. This is the third time Dai acted with Elvin Ng. Then, 8 Days touted them as the male version of Zoe Tay and Fann Wong. They appeared together in several cover page of 8 Days and I magazine.

In 2011, Dai moved back to Shanghai, China and film a co-production drama Precious. He played Ling Zhi Chu in Precious. Qi Yuwu replaced him, who was originally selected to play the role of Mo Li Guang, as the male lead in the drama series A Song to Remember.

In 2012, Dai acted in Poetic Justice.

In 2014, Dai signed on with Chinese artiste management agency Mango Entertainment. Dai was originally selected to play the role of Hong Khee Leong, the male lead in the drama series Sudden, but with his departure from Mediacorp, Romeo Tan replaced him.

In 2019, Dai reprised his role in the China's remake of The Little Nyonya with Xiang Yun and Jeffrey Xu in The New Little Nyonya (新。小娘惹),

== Personal life ==
In 2009, Dai applied for Singapore Permanent Resident (PR) status but failed as his academic certificates and birth certificate were not translated to English. He successfully became a Singapore PR in 2014 but lost the status in 2021 after he failed to renew his Re-Entry Permit in time.

On 29 July 2013, Dai's manager revealed that Dai was officially changing his name to Dai Xiangyu.

Dai married actress Chen Zihan in Beijing on 19 May 2016.

== Filmography ==
=== Television series ===
Year	Title	Role	Notes	Ref
2008	Taste of Love	Fang Youfang		
2008	The Little Nyonya	Yamamoto Yousuke		
2009	Table of Glory	He Jiajun		
2009	Together	Lin Xiaobei		
2010	Carlsberg Telemovie Showcase (皇帽瑞狮喜迎虎电视电影系列)	Tiancai		
2010	No Limits	Wang Yule		
2010	Breakout	Yang Zhenfeng		
2011	Precious (千金)	Ling Zhichu	Remake of The Little Nyonya	
2012	The Quarters	Bai Jinhai		
2012	Poetic Justice	Fang Zhengye		
2014	Pearl Earrings			
2015	Singles Villa			
2015	The Girl Wearing Tassel Earrings			
2016	Demon Girl (半妖倾城)	Duan Shaoqin		
2016-2017	Demon Girl 2 (半妖倾城2)	Duan Shaoqin		
2020	Eternal Love of Dream	Nie Chuyin		
2020	The New Little Nyonya (新。小娘惹)	Yamamoto Yousuke	China Version of The Little Nyonya, in which he reprises his role either	
2022	Rising Lady (她们的名字)	Zhang Weichen		

=== Film ===
Year	Title	Role	Notes	Ref
2007	Making Love (美克拉)			
2011	The Ultimate Winner	Sky		
2011	X3 Trouble	1st friend		
2014	Midnight Hair			
2016	Lost in the Pacific	Pilot		

== Awards and nominations ==
Year	Award	Category	Nominated work	Result	Ref
2009	Star Awards	Best Supporting Actor	The Little Nyonya	Nominated	
2009	Star Awards	Best Newcomer	—N/a	Won	
2010	Star Awards	Best Actor	Together	Nominated	
2010	Star Awards	Male Media Darling	—N/a	Won	
2010	Star Awards	Top 10 Most Popular Male Artistes	—N/a	Won	
2011	Star Awards	Top 10 Most Popular Male Artistes	—N/a	Nominated	
2012	Star Awards	Top 10 Most Popular Male Artistes	—N/a	Nominated	
2013	Star Awards	Best Actor	Poetic Justice	Nominated	
2013	Star Awards	Top 10 Most Popular Male Artistes	—N/a	Won	
2014	Star Awards	Top 10 Most Popular Male Artistes	—N/a	Nominated	
