= A Million Treasures =

- 百万宝
- Genre: Modern Drama
- Written by: Ang Eng Tee
- Starring: Li Nanxing; Zoe Tay; Felicia Chin; Kang Cheng Xi; Pan Lingling; Zhang Xinxiang
- Country of origin: Singapore
- Original language: Chinese
- No. of episodes: 25

Production
- Producer: Li Ning Qiang
- Running time: approx. 45 minutes

Original release
- Network: MediaCorp Channel 8
- Release: 4 December 2006 – 5 January 2007

A Million Treasures (Chinese: 百万宝) is a Singaporean Chinese drama that was telecast on Singapore's free-to-air channel, MediaCorp TV Channel 8. This show, consisting of 25 episodes, made its debut on 4 December 2006 and ended its run on 5 January 2007. The theme song of the show is sung by Mi Lu Bing.

== Cast ==
=== Main cast ===
- Li Nanxing as Ma Da
- Zoe Tay as Bai Xing Xing
- Felicia Chin as Lin Xiao Bao
- Kang Cheng Xi as Ma Lu
- Pan Lingling as Zhi Zhi
- Zhang Xinxiang as Tang Xi Yao

=== Supporting cast ===
- Priscelia Chan as Bai Liang Liang
- Rayson Tan as Hong De Hua
- Michelle Chong as Li Shu Xian
- Candyce Toh as Ah Jin
- Brandon Wong as Ah Qing
- Liang Tian as Steven
- Ye Shipin as Li Shu Xian's father
- Zhang Wei as Xing Xing and Liang Liang's father

== Synopsis ==
Bai Xingxing (Zoe Tay) is smart and has always done well in her studies. She is steady, driven and dares to take up a challenge. When all her peers are busy with romantic pursuits, Xingxing and her boyfriend Tang Xiyao (Zhang Wenxiang) devote their time and efforts to prepare for their careers after graduation. Xingxing is at the peak of her life - at the young age of 26, she makes her first one million dollars. She sets up franchises, drives a luxury car, and invests in stock and property, however, she owes a large part of her success to Xiyao.

Although Xingxing has the drive and guts, she is too quick-tempered and is not detailed-oriented. Xiyao, on the other hand, is the opposite of Xingxing. Meticulous and frugal in nature, Xiyao's strength makes up for Xingxing's shortcomings.

As the saying goes, familiarity breeds contempt. In the case of Xingxing, she increasingly finds that Xiyao lacks the drive and ambition to make it big. Thinking that Xingxing has found a new love interest, Xiyao leaves without a word. Without his help, the reckless Xingxing makes a rash and fatal decision that leads to the closing down of her chain of shops. Her wealth dwindles swiftly and in the end, she has to file for bankruptcy.

Things begin to go downhill for the penniless Xingxing. The other person who finds himself in the same predicament is Ma Da (Li Nanxing). Ma Da originally works as a chef in a big hotel. The brash and arrogant man is unable to accept criticism and bears a grudge against Xingxing because she once spoke badly of his chicken rice. Later, Ma Da finds himself fired from his job and blames Xingxing for his woes. In return, Xingxing also looks upon Ma Da as her nemesis.

With financial help from Liang Liang (Priscelia Chan), who is Xingxing's younger sister and De Hua (Rayson Tan), who is Liang Liang's boyfriend, Xingxing sets up a mobile fast food wagon business. Unfortunately, she is met with strong competition as there is also another operator at the same location.

This other food wagon is managed by a couple in their 20s: Xiao Bao (Felicia Chin) and Ma Lu (Kang Chengxi) who is Ma Da's brother. Although the couple appears laidback and hippy, they can be unscrupulous and do not hesitate to compete head-on with Xingxing for business. Conflicts between both parties ensue.

Although Ma Lu and Xiao Bao like each other, they don't dare to tell their feelings for each other because of their own personal problems that others do not know. Ma Lu suffers from a sleeping disorder since young, while Xiao Bao was badly scalded by hot oil which leaves an extremely ugly scar on her leg.

The disagreement between Xingxing and Ma Da is blown to such a proportion that they literally view each other like arch-enemies. However, they are thrown together as a result of a lottery ticket they have chipped in to buy. The lottery ticket strikes the first prize but is misplaced. They embark on a frantic search for the lottery ticket that's worth $2 million and in the process, begin to have a better understanding of each other.

Ma Lu finally learns about Xiao Bao's disfigured leg. Unable to accept such a startling discovery, he flees. Xiao Bao is heartbroken and leaves in tears. When Xingxing and Ma Da find out about the truth behind Ma Lu's sudden desertion, they give him a sound scolding. It is only then that Ma Lu realizes how truly unhappy he has been since Xiao Bao left him.

Xiyao, who is nursing a broken heart, binges and travels around the world. He puts on so much weight that he is akin to an over-bloated balloon. When he decides to put his past behind him, including his feelings for Xingxing, Xiyao discovers that she has not betrayed his love in the past. He decides to resume their relationship when he finds out about Xingxing's present financial predicament. However, given his pathetic appearance, he is hesitant to approach her. He also realizes that he now has a love rival in Ma Da.

There are many questions left unsolved. Will Xi Yao win Xingxing's heart again? Or will Xingxing marry Ma Da? How can Ma Lu convince Xiao Bao to return to him? Will the search for the $2 million lottery ticket be successful?

== Viewership ==
With a strong cast of one of Singapore's most popular actors and actresses Li Nanxing, Zoe Tay and Felicia Chin, this show received high viewership ratings, ranking 3rd for Year 2006. An average of 800,000 people watched this show, a feat that few shows have achieved. In particular, the finale episode received 860,000 viewers.

== See also ==
- List of programmes broadcast by Mediacorp Channel 8
