= Adam Chen =

Singaporean actor and businessman (born 1976)

- Born: 24 June 1976 (age 50); Singapore
- Other name: Zhan Jinquan
- Education: The Chinese High School; Hwa Chong Junior College; National University of Singapore
- Occupations: Actor; host; businessman
- Years active: 2001–present

Chinese name
- Traditional Chinese: 詹金泉
- Simplified Chinese: 詹金泉
- Hanyu Pinyin: Zhān Jīnquán

Adam Chen (born 24 June 1976) is a Singaporean actor, host and businessman.

== Early life ==
Chen was educated at The Chinese High School and Hwa Chong Junior College. Whilst a civil engineering student at the National University of Singapore he did some modelling and joined Route to Glamour, a talent show organised by SPH MediaWorks. He was offered a contract and joined MediaWorks after graduating.

== Career ==
Before going into acting, Chen worked as a model for numerous print and television commercials in Singapore.

In 2001, Chen participated in the Chinese talent competition, Route to Glamour, by SPH MediaWorks' Channel U. He was then signed by SPH Mediaworks to be an artiste for Channel U.

In 2003, Chen extended his contract with SPH Mediaworks for one year and then in 2004, extended for another three years.

He earned himself a role in the Singapore-Hong Kong co-produced TV series Yummy Yummy in 2005, before proceeding to work together with other famous actors such as Nicholas Tse, Dicky Cheung and Li Yapeng in TV series jointly produced by Singapore and other countries.

When SPH MediaWorks closed in 2005, he was transferred to MediaCorp, which SPH had merged with. Chen has also acted in English language TV dramas produced by MediaCorp Channel 5.

== Ventures ==
In 2002, Chen and his friends set up a merchandising company.

In 2009, Chen opened two Japanese burger restaurants, R Burger, in the town area. The chain closed in 2013. He also owns Three Kings Kitchen, a duck and chicken rice stall with three outlets.

In 2013, Chen and his friends spent $500,000 to open Park Cafe at Holland Village, Singapore. Chen also has a yakitori restaurant, Birders, and a donburi restaurant, Ebisu Bowls. All three food outlets have since shuttered. He later opened a Japanese izakaya, Ikki Izakaya, at Metropolis of Star Vista, One-north.

He is also the owner of bar chain, Five, which has four outlets and also a bistro, Golden, located in arthouse cinema, The Projector, at Golden Mile Tower.

In 2023, Chen opened a rooftop café, Sunset on 11 (abbreviated as Soll), at the 11th floor of Louis Kienne Serviced Residences at Havelock Road.

Beside the food and beverage business, Chen also owns Japanese watch boutique, Maker’s Watch Knot, in Tiong Bahru.

In 2026, Chen said he had left his food and beverage businesses.

== Personal life ==
Chen grew up in the Havelock Road neighbourhood and currently still resides in the area. It was reported in January 2025 that he had been married for three years to a Japanese.

== Filmography ==
=== Film ===
| Year | Title | Role | Notes | Ref. |
|---|---|---|---|---|
| 2008 | 18 Grams of Love | | | |

=== Television series ===
| Year | Title | Role | Notes | Ref. |
|---|---|---|---|---|
| 2001 | Making Headlines | | | |
| 2001 | Touched | | | |
| 2002 | Cash Is King | Qi Guanghui | | |
| 2002 | Wonderful Life – Fantasy | | | |
| 2002 | Wonderful Life – Pass It Forward | | | |
| 2002 | Feel 100% | | | |
| 2003 | Back to Basics | | | |
| 2004 | Project J | | | |
| 2004 | 100% Feel | | | |
| 2004 | OK, No Problem | | | |
| 2004 | Be Somebody | | | |
| 2004 | Zero | | | |
| 2005 | Green Pals | Wen Huasheng | | |
| 2005 | Yummy Yummy – Food for Life | Rambo | | |
| 2005 | Lifeline | Pang Choon Kiat | | |
| 2006 | The Shining Star | Ah B | | |
| 2006 | Yours Always | Zeng Letian | | |
| 2006 | Life Story | | | |
| 2006 | An Enchanted Life | Xiao Fei | | |
| 2006 | House of Joy | | | |
| 2006 | The Proud Twins | Murong Zhong | | |
| 2006 | The Royal Swordsmen | Lin Xiaoquan | | |
| 2007 | Let It Shine | Lin Haifeng | | |
| 2007 | Lifeline 2 | Pang Choon Kiat | | |
| 2007 | The Heroic Swordsman | | | |
| 2007 | Metamorphosis | Ke Mingde | | |
| 2007 | Maggie and Me 2 | | | |
| 2008 | Just in Singapore | Ma Zhigang | | |
| 2008 | Love Blossoms | Guo Zipeng | | |
| 2008 | Love Blossoms II | Guo Zipeng | | |
| 2009 | Welcome Home, My Love | Ken | | |
| 2009 | Your Hand In Mine | Roland | | |
| 2009 | Daddy at Home | Chen Jinfeng | | |
| 2010 | Happy Family | Zhen Yingxian | | |
| 2010 | The Score | David Zhang | | |
| 2010 | Breakout | Alex | | |
| 2011 | C.L.I.F. | Lim Boon Loong | | |
| 2011 | Bountiful Blessings | Morning | | |
| 2012 | Rescue 995 | Bryan | | |
| 2012 | Unriddle 2 | Wu Zhiyun | | |
| 2012 | The Enchanted | Yongsheng | | |
| 2012 | Poetic Justice | Benny | | |
| 2013 | The Enchanted | Hu Yong Cheng | | |
| 2013 | Gonna Make It! | Ice | | |
| 2015 | Tanglin | Adam Tong | | |
| 2019 | Hello From The Other Side - Its Time (阴错阳差 — 时辰到) | Wu Guohui | | |
| 2020 | A Jungle Survivor (森林生存记) | Eddie | | |
| 2021 | The Peculiar Pawnbroker (人心鉴定师) | Coby | | |
| 2022 | Healing Heroes (医生不是神) | Huang Qinsheng | | |
| 2023 | Oppa, Saranghae! | Lawrence | | |
| 2023 | Cash on Delivery | Juncong's father | | |
| 2023 | The Sky is Still Blue | Jack | | |
| Upcoming | 至死不渝 | | | |

=== Variety shows ===
| Year | Title | Notes | Ref. |
|---|---|---|---|
| 2001 | Route To Glamour (新卧虎藏龙) | Contestant | |
| 2003 | Live Unlimited (综艺无界线) | | |
| 2004 | Mission Possible (地球无界限) | | |
| 2005 | Planet Shakers (自游疯) | | |
| 2005 | Man O Man (男人帮) | | |
| 2006 | On the Beat! (都是新发现) | | |
| 2006 | Mighty Race at Frasers Centrepoint Malls | | |
| 2006 | Lifewise | | |
| 2008 | U Are The One (唯我独尊) | | |
| 2008 | Icons on Wheels | | |
| 2010 | Taiwan – My Taste Paradise (食分不一样) | | |
| 2010 | Let's Party With Food (食福满人间) | Guest appearance | |

== Awards and nominations ==
| Year | Award | Category | Nominated work | Result | Ref |
|---|---|---|---|---|---|
| 2006 | Star Awards | Best Supporting Actor | The Shining Star (as Ah B) | Nominated | |
