= The Enchanted (TV series) =

- 浴女图
- Genre: Women; Drama; Romance
- Story by: Koh Teng Liang
- Starring: Chen Hanwei; Paige Chua; Moo Yan Yee; Ya Hui; Akit Tay; Tracy Lee
- Opening theme: 再给爱一次机会 by Derrick Hoh
- Ending theme: 原来爱 by Nick Yeo
- Countries of origin: Malaysia; Singapore
- Original language: Mandarin
- No. of episodes: 25

Production
- Producers: Joseph Ma; Yeo Saik Pin
- Production locations: Kuala Lumpur, Malaysia
- Running time: approx. 45 minutes (excluding advertisements)

Original release
- Network: Mediacorp Channel 8 (Singapore)
- Release: 15 August – 18 September 2013

The Enchanted (Chinese: 浴女图) is considered the ninth Malaysian production by Mediacorp Studios Malaysia. Filming began in 2012 and took place in Kuala Lumpur, Malaysia. It made its debut in Singapore on 15 August 2013, though it first aired in Malaysia's Astro Shuang Xing on 9 May 2013. It stars Chen Hanwei, Paige Chua, Moo Yan Yee, Ya Hui, Akit Tay and Tracy Lee as casts of this series. It is shown on weekdays at 7pm.

== Cast ==
- Chen Hanwei as Shi Zhuang Bi 石壮弼 / Ah Bi 阿弼
- Paige Chua as Chen Jingli 陈景丽 / Monitor 班长
- Moo Yan Yee as Qian Jiayi 钱佳怡
- Ya Hui as Liang Lulu 梁露露
- Akit Tay 郑子娟 as Qi Mingxing 戚明星 / Seven : Tay was approached by a production company to go to an audition by Mediacorp Studios Malaysia. After the audition, she was given the role of Qi, one of the main leads, and was also signed by Mediacorp as an artiste.
- Tracy Lee as Bai Xuena 白雪娜 / Snow White
- Desmond Tan as Du Jiahong 杜家泓
- Aileen Tan as Huang Song Li 黄颂莉
- JC Chee 朱畯丞 as Xie Zhifei 谢志飞
- Adam Chen as Hu Yong Cheng 胡永晟
- Cathryn Lee 李元玲 as Yao Dingding 姚丁丁
- Zhang Xinxiang as Qian Zhong Ming 钱仲铭
- Joelin Wong as Yang Rui Qi 杨瑞琪

== Release ==
The drama was announced to premiere in October 2012 in Singapore but was delayed to August 2013 instead, though Malaysia's Astro Shuang Xing aired it earlier on 9 May 2013, cancelling the broadcast of 96°C Café.

== See also ==
- List of MediaCorp Channel 8 Chinese Drama Series (2010s)
