= Campus SuperStar season 3 =

Campus SuperStar
- Season 3
- Hosted by: Pornsak; Felicia Chin; Lee Teng; Yuan Shuai
- Judges: Li Feihui; Jim Lim; Ken Tay; Xiaohan; Dawn Yip (guest); Cavin Soh (guest); Maggie Theng (guest); Lee Wei Song (guest); Kelvin Tan (guest); Wu Jia Ming (guest)
- Winner: Jarod Lee
- Runner-up: Rachel Chua

Release
- Original network: MediaCorp Channel U
- Original release: 4 January – 12 April 2009

Season chronology
- ← Previous; Season 2 Next → Season 4

Campus SuperStar is a Singaporean television music competition to find new singing talent. Contestants are students from secondary schools, junior colleges and institutes of technical education. The third season began airing on MediaCorp Channel U on 4 January 2009 and ended on 12 April 2009.

Jim Lim and Li Feihui were the two judges from the previous season to return, and was joined by Xiaohan and Ken Tay, who all appeared as judges for the first time. Previous judge Jimmy Ye declined to return. Pornsak, Felicia Chin and Lee Teng hosted the show, while Yuan Shuai was employed as the online correspondent. Yoga Lin, winner of the first season of One Million Star, was invited to be the ambassador of the show.

This was the first season to have a reduced number of finalists from 20 to 12, without equal gender representation (eight female finalists and four male finalists), and this season was also notable for being the only season in which the competition have two revival rounds, the 'immunity' and 'sudden-death' eliminations during performance show, an elimination-based sing-off, a non-Chinese contestant was a part of the top 12, and one male and three females represented in the finale, as opposed to two per gender on the past two seasons (the format also happened on the fourth season in 2013).

The series was won by Jarod Lee, a 13-year-old student from Ngee Ann Secondary School, and won a two-year MediaCorp management contract and a cash prize of $2,000, beating Rachel Chua, a 14-year-old student from Anglican High School, who was also the first and only contestant to be eliminated and reinstated in the competition twice.

== Judges and hosts ==
Jim Lim was confirmed to be returning to the judging panel after judging season two of the show. Li Feihui was also announced to return for this third year as a judge. Season two judge and vocal coach Jimmy Ye declined to return as a judge for the third season. It was announced that two new judges would be brought in to replace Ye on the judging panel. Award-winning lyricist Xiaohan and singer Ken Tay were instated as the third and fourth judge.

Season two host Pornsak returned to host the show. Former season two host Dasmond Koh left the show and his position was taken over by actress Felicia Chin and SuperHost runner-up Lee Teng. U Are the One winner Yuan Shuai hosted the online streaming programme as the show's social media correspondent, increasing the show's involvement with its fans and offering behind the scenes information and news.

== Selection process ==
=== Applications and first auditions ===
The audition was opened to students studying in secondary schools, junior colleges or institutes of technical education in Singapore. Auditions in front of the judges for season 3 took place in MediaCorp on 8 and 9 November 2008. Applicants are to report to the venue for the audition in their respective school uniforms. Out of 2046 applicants, 141 were put through to the second round of the auditions.

=== Second auditions ===
Similar to the first auditions, the second auditions took place in MediaCorp on 15 November 2008. 107 contestants were eliminated at this stage of the competition, leaving 34 to compete in the final round of the auditions.

=== Third auditions ===
34 contestants competed at this stage of the competition on 24 November 2008. 22 contestants were eliminated and the remaining 12 were put through to the live shows as finalists. For the first time in Campus SuperStar history, the contestants do not have equal gender representation; eight females and four males advanced to the finals.

== Finalists ==
Key:

– Winner
– Runner-up
– Third place
– Advanced via Wildcard round 1
– Advanced via Wildcard round 2

Act	Age(s)	School	Result
Jarod Lee 李奕贤	13	Ngee Ann Secondary School	Winner
Rachel Chua 蔡艾珈	14	Anglican High School	Runner-up
Joselin Ng 黄慧婷	15	Chua Chu Kang Secondary School	3rd-4th place
Yap Jia Min 叶嘉敏	15	Anglo-Chinese Junior College	3rd-4th place
Ridhwan Azman	15	Bendemeer Secondary School	5th-8th place
Benita Cheng 郑琪颖	15	Pasir Ris Crest Secondary School	5th-8th place
Mavis Li Li 李李美子	18	Deyi Secondary School	5th-8th place
Rachel Lim 林瑞敏	14	Methodist Girls' School	5th-8th place
Rachael Chang 张慧诗	15	Jurong West Secondary School	9th-12th place
Adrian Jorge 黄力生	15	Manjusri Secondary School	9th-12th place
Jeremy Teng 丁文淞	14	Commonwealth Secondary School	9th-12th place
Shelly Tsai 蔡梦真	14	Hwa Chong International School	9th-12th place

== Live shows ==
The live shows began on 12 January. Each week, the contestants' performances took place on Monday at 8:00pm and the results were announced on the same night at 11:30pm. As with previous seasons, each live show had a different theme. The results show often featured guest performances and sometimes a group performance by the remaining contestants.

On the first live show, sixth live results show and live final, One Million Star season one winner and the show's ambassador Yoga Lin performed. The first live show also featured performances by Singaporean band Mi Lu Bing and singer Olivia Ong. The fourth live results show included performance from One Million Star season 3 fifth runner-up Wong Jing Lun while Project SuperStar season one runner-up Kelly Poon performed on the fifth results show. Project SuperStar season one female runner-up Shi Xin Hui and Malaysian singer Fish Leong performed on the seventh live result show. Project SuperStar season one male second runner-up Derrick Hoh performed on the eighth live results show, while Taiwanese hip hop band Da Mouth performed on the eleventh and thirteenth. The twelfth live results show and thirteenth live show included performance from Taiwanese boy band Fahrenheit. The eleventh and twelfth live shows also featured performance by Singaporean singer Jocie Kwok. Singaporean singer Meixin performed on the thirteenth live show as well. One Million Star season two runner-up Rachel Liang and the winner for the first season of Project SuperStar, Kelvin Tan performed for the live final.

Guest judging roles were brought in during the eighth, twelfth and thirteenth week of the live shows. Former Project SuperStar judge Dawn Yip attended the eighth live show, and Singaporean singer Maggie Theng attended the twelfth live show. Lee Wei Song, Kelvin Tan, Wu Jia Ming and Theng attended the thirteenth live show as guest judges as well. During the twelfth week of the live shows, it was announced that judge Jim Lim was unable to present for the live shows due to work commitments in Taiwan with singer A-mei. During the week, it was announced that former judge Cavin Soh would replace him as a judge on the show.

=== Results summary ===
Colour key

–	Contestant did not perform
–	Contestant received the lowest judges' score or was in the bottom two based on judges' score or failed to receive enough judges' score and was in the danger zone
–	Contestant received the lowest combined total or was in the bottom two and was eliminated
–	Contestant received the lowest judges' score and was eliminated (did not face the public vote)
–	Contestant did not face the public vote was immune from elimination
–	Contestant received the highest judges' score or combined total

Weekly results per contestant
Contestant	Week 2		Week 3		Week 4		Week 5		Week 6		Week 7		Week 8		Week 9		Week 10		Week 11		Week 12		Week 13			
Contestant	Week 2		Week 3		Week 4		Week 5		Week 6		Week 7		Week 8		Week 9		Week 10		Week 11		Week 12		Round 1		Round 2	
Contestant	PS	RS	PS	RS	PS	RS	PS	RS	PS	RS	PS	RS	PS	RS	PS	RS	PS	RS	PS	RS	PS	RS	PS	RS	PS	RS
Jarod Lee	1st 31.5	Safe	—	—	—	—	5th 24.5	Safe	—	—	2nd 29.5	Safe	—	—	3rd 28.5	Safe	2nd 30.0	Safe	1st 33.5	Immune	—	—	1st 121.0	Safe	1st 65.0	Winner; 50.75%
Rachel Chua	2nd 29.5	Safe	—	—	—	—	3rd 26.0	5th	Eliminated (week 5)				1st 40.5	Immune	2nd 29.5	Safe	1st 30.5	Safe	2nd 32.5	2nd	1st 42.5	Immune	2nd 118.0	Safe	1st 65.0	Runner-up; 49.25%
Joselin Ng	4th 25.5	Safe	—	—	1st 27.0	Safe	—	—	—	—	3rd 28.0	Safe	—	—	4th 27.5	Safe	6th 24.5	Eliminated (week 10)			2nd 39.0	1st	4th 101.0	Bottom two	Eliminated (week 13)	
Yap Jia Min	—	—	1st 30.0	Safe	—	—	1st 31.0	Safe	—	—	1st 34.5	Safe	—	—	1st 31.0	Safe	4th 27.5	Safe	3rd 29.5	1st	—	—	3rd 117.5	Bottom two	Eliminated (week 13)	
Mavis Li Li	—	—	3rd 27.5	6th	Eliminated (week 3)								2nd 37.5	1st	6th 25.5	Safe	3rd 29.5	Safe	4th 28.5	Eliminated (week 11)						
Rachel Lim	3rd 26.0	Safe	—	—	3rd 25.0	Safe	—	—	1st 30.0	Safe	—	—	—	—	4th 27.5	Safe	5th 26.5	5th	Eliminated (week 10)		3rd 34.5	Bottom two	Not returned (week 12)			
Ridhwan Azman	—	—	6th 24.5	Safe	1st 27.0	Safe	—	—	2nd 27.0	Safe	—	—	—	—	7th 25.0	7th	Eliminated (week 9)									
Benita Cheng	—	—	2nd 29.5	Safe	—	—	3rd 26.0	Safe	3rd 26.5	Safe	—	—	—	—	8th 24.0	Eliminated (week 9)					4th 33.0	Bottom two	Not returned (week 12)			
Jeremy Teng	—	—	4th 26.5	Safe	4th 23.5	Safe	—	—	—	—	4th 24.5	4th	3rd 31.0	Bottom four	Not returned (week 8)											
Rachael Chang	—	—	5th 25.0	Safe	—	—	2nd 27.0	Safe	4th 23.5	4th	Eliminated (week 6)		4th 29.5	Bottom four	Not returned (week 8)											
Shelly Tsai	5th 25.5	Safe	—	—	5th 19.0	5th	Eliminated (week 4)						6th 28.0	Bottom four	Not returned (week 8)											
Adrian Jorge	6th 20.5	6th	Eliminated (week 2)										5th 28.5	Bottom four	Not returned (week 8)											

=== Live show details ===
==== Week 1: Pre-show concert (4 January) ====
- Theme: Alumni duets/trios
- Group performance: "By Now"
- Special performance: "只对你有感觉" (performed by Felicia Chin, Lee Teng, Pornsak and Yuan Shuai)
- Musical guests: Season one and season two top 20 finalists featuring season three hosts and Euphoria Cheerleading Team ("CSS进行曲"), Mi Lu Bing ("世界麻烦借过一下"), Olivia Ong ("如燕") and Yoga Lin ("残酷月光" and "伯乐")

The top 12 finalists were revealed in this pre-recorded 2-hour special episode, featuring performances from the finalists together with former alumnus from the past seasons.

Contestants' performances on the first pre-recorded show
Contestant	Order	Song (duet/trio)
Mavis Li Li	1	"给我感觉" (with Keely Wee)
Jeremy Teng	2	"天天夜夜" (with Joanna Teo)
Benita Cheng	3	"你最珍贵" (with Chen Yi Yuan)
Yap Jia Min	4	"傻瓜" (with Seah Hui Xian)
Shelly Tsai	5	"热带雨林" (with Clara Tan)
Adrian Jorge	6	"记得爱" (with Goh Fu Kuan & Wan Choon Keat)
Ridhwan Azman	7	"被风吹过的夏天" (with Sheena Goh & Shermaine Goh)
Joselin Ng	8	"爱什么稀罕" (with Geraldine See)
Rachel Lim	9	"一眼瞬间" (with Benjamin Hum)
Rachel Chua	10	"痛快" (with Agnes Low)
Rachael Chang	11	"恋爱达人" (with Hong Yu Yang)
Jarod Lee	12	"新不了情" (with Shawn Tok)

==== Week 2 (12 January) ====
- Theme: Their representation songs
- Sing-off song: "童话"

For the first six weeks of competition, contestants are split into two groups competing in one of the two weeks. This week's sing-off is the only time the elimination is decided by muting one of the microphones.

Contestants' performances on the second live show
Contestant	Order	Song	Judges' score					Result
Contestant	Order	Song	JL	XH	KT	FH	Total	Result
Adrian Jorge	1	"不完美"	6.0	6.0	4.5	4.0	20.5	Sing-off/Eliminated
Rachel Chua	2	"第一天"	6.5	7.5	8.0	7.5	29.5	Safe
Rachel Lim	3	"I Believe"	6.0	7.0	6.5	6.5	26.0	Safe
Shelly Tsai	4	"一个人的精彩"	5.5	7.0	5.0	5.5	23.0	Sing-off/Safe
Jarod Lee	5	"I Believe"	6.5	9.5	8.5	7.0	31.5	Safe
Joselin Ng	6	"那又如何"	6.0	6.5	6.5	6.5	25.5	Safe

==== Week 3 (19 January) ====
- Theme: Their representation songs
- Sing-off song: "遗失的美好"

Similar to week 2, contestants compete in one of two groups performing the same theme. Beginning this week, the sing-off eliminates the contestant when their pitch was altered to a lowered pitch.

Contestants' performances on the third live show
Contestant	Order	Song	Judges' score					Result
Contestant	Order	Song	JL	XH	KT	FH	Total	Result
Mavis Li Li	1	"我要快乐"	6.0	7.0	7.5	7.0	27.5	Sing-off/Eliminated
Jeremy Teng	2	"彩虹"	6.0	6.5	6.5	7.5	26.5	Safe
Yap Jia Min	3	"灰姑娘"	7.5	8.0	8.0	6.5	30.0	Safe
Rachael Chang	4	"勇气"	6.5	6.5	6.0	6.0	25.0	Safe
Ridhwan Azman	5	"就是我"	6.0	7.0	6.5	5.0	24.5	Sing-off/Safe
Benita Cheng	6	"心动"	6.5	8.5	7.0	7.5	29.5	Safe

==== Week 4 (2 February) ====
- Theme: Their favourite subjects
- Musical guest: Wong Jing Lun ("月光" and "缺席")
- Sing-off song: "天黑黑"

Contestants' performances on the fourth live show
Contestant	Order	Song	Judges' score					Result
Contestant	Order	Song	JL	XH	KT	FH	Total	Result
Shelly Tsai	1	"星光"	5.5	6.0	3.5	4.0	19.0	Sing-off/Eliminated
Jeremy Teng	2	"豆浆油条"	7.0	6.5	5.0	5.0	23.5	Safe
Joselin Ng	3	"热情的沙漠"	6.0	7.0	7.5	6.5	27.0	Safe
Ridhwan Azman	4	"空秋千"	6.5	7.0	6.5	7.0	27.0	Safe
Rachel Lim	5	"月牙湾"	6.0	6.5	6.5	6.0	25.0	Sing-off/Safe

==== Week 5 (9 February) ====
- Theme: Their favourite subjects
- Musical guest: Kelly Poon ("本小姐不爱" and "限时的遗忘")
- Sing-off song: "城里的月光"

Contestants' performances on the fifth live show
Contestant	Order	Song	Judges' score					Result
Contestant	Order	Song	JL	XH	KT	FH	Total	Result
Benita Cheng	1	"蓝天"	6.0	7.5	6.5	6.0	26.0	Safe
Rachel Chua	2	"C大调"	6.5	6.5	7.0	6.0	26.0	Sing-off/Eliminated
Yap Jia Min	3	"雨天"	7.0	8.0	8.0	8.0	31.0	Safe
Jarod Lee	4	"听海"	6.0	7.0	6.0	5.5	24.5	Sing-off/Safe
Rachael Chang	5	"孤单北半球"	7.0	7.5	6.5	6.0	27.0	Safe

==== Week 6 (16 February) ====
- Theme: Songs for their teachers
- Musical guest: Yoga Lin ("分享" with Ridhwan Azman, Rachael Chang, Benita Cheng, Jarod Lee, Rachel Lim, Joselin Ng, Jeremy Teng and Yap Jia Min; "爱情是圆的" and "病态")
- Sing-off song: "安静"

Contestants' performances on the sixth live show
Contestant	Order	Song	Judges' score					Result
Contestant	Order	Song	JL	XH	KT	FH	Total	Result
Rachael Chang	1	"至少还有你"	6.0	6.5	5.5	5.5	23.5	Sing-off/Eliminated
Benita Cheng	2	"恋之憩"	6.0	7.5	7.0	6.0	26.5	Safe
Rachel Lim	3	"Beautiful Love"	7.5	8.0	7.5	7.0	30.0	Sing-off/Safe
Ridhwan Azman	4	"翅膀"	6.5	6.5	7.0	7.0	27.0	Safe

==== Week 7 (23 February) ====
- Theme: Songs for their teachers
- Musical guests: Shi Xin Hui ("无能为力" and "你没想像中爱我") and Fish Leong ("没有如果")
- Sing-off song: "记得"

Contestants' performances on the seventh live show
Contestant	Order	Song	Judges' score					Result
Contestant	Order	Song	JL	XH	KT	FH	Total	Result
Joselin Ng	1	"我相信"	6.0	7.5	7.5	7.0	28.0	Sing-off/Safe
Jarod Lee	2	"改变自己"	7.0	8.0	7.0	7.5	29.5	Safe
Yap Jia Min	3	"有你多好"	8.0	9.0	9.0	8.5	34.5	Safe
Jeremy Teng	4	"专属天使"	6.0	6.5	6.5	5.5	24.5	Sing-off/Eliminated

==== Week 8: Wildcard round 1 (2 March) ====
- Theme: Derrick Hoh's challenge (billed as "I want to challenge Derrick Hoh!")
- Musical guest: Derrick Hoh ("咬字" and "很想你")
- Sing-off songs: "朋友一生一起走" (remaining four singers) and "老鼠爱大米" (Chang and Li Li)

The six singers who were eliminated from the first six live shows returned to the stage to perform for the Wildcard round. Beginning this round, individual scores from the judges are no longer shown, as the scores are shown at the end of all the performances; a scoring quota is also imposed from this round onward, which determines the safety of each of the contestants; one contestant with a higher or lower score will be exempt from the public vote that week. The scoring quota this week is set at 39.0 points (a snippet of Hoh's performance from the first season). Two contestants will be reinstated from the competition, one with a higher judges' score above the quota, and a second with a higher combined total from the remaining contestants. Former Project SuperStar judge Dawn Yip was brought in as the guest judge.

Contestants' performances on the eighth live show
Contestant	Order	Song	Judges' score	Result
Jeremy Teng	1	"我可以"	31.0	Sing-off/Not revived
Mavis Li Li	2	"3-7-20-1"	37.5	Sing-off/Revived
Shelly Tsai	3	"我知道你很难过"	28.0	Sing-off/Not revived
Adrian Jorge	4	"终于说出口"	28.5	Not revived
Rachel Chua	5	"你是爱我的"	40.5	Immune/Revived
Rachael Chang	6	"我想有个家"	29.5	Sing-off/Not revived

The results show is the only one where two Sing-off songs were decided (Teng, Tsai and Chang in order) and a computerized elimination for one singer (in the case, Jorge).

==== Week 9 (9 March) ====
- Theme: Motivating drama theme songs
- Sing-off song: "遇见"

For the next three weeks, two contestants were eliminated from each week of the shows. The quota for the week is 26.

Contestants' performances on the ninth live show
Contestant	Order	Song	Drama series	Judges' score	Result
Yap Jia Min	1	"如燕"	The Little Nyonya	31.0	Safe
Mavis Li Li	2	"不见不散"	Be There or Be Square	25.5	Sing-off/Safe
Jarod Lee	3	"拥有"	Homerun	28.5	Safe
Rachel Lim	4	"自己"	Mulan	27.5	Safe
Benita Cheng	5	"你没想像中爱我"	Perfect Cut	24.0	Eliminated immediately
Rachel Chua	6	"曾经太年轻"	The Hospital	29.5	Safe
Ridhwan Azman	7	"从开始到现在"	Winter Sonata	25.0	Sing-off/Eliminated
Joselin Ng	8	"你要的爱"	Meteor Garden	27.5	Safe

During the live results, Lee and Chai advanced to the next round via a sing-off instead of the traditional computerized result.

==== Week 10 (16 March) ====
- Theme: Songs for their best friends
- Sing-off song: "当你孤单你会想起谁"

The quota for this week is 28. Beginning this round, the altered pitch during the sing-off is adjusted to a higher pitch.

Contestants' performances on the tenth live show
Contestant	Order	Song	Judges' score	Result
Jarod Lee	1	"隐形的翅膀"	30.0	Safe
Rachel Chua	2	"Dear Friend"	30.5	Safe
Rachel Lim	3	"启程"	26.5	Sing-off/Eliminated
Joselin Ng	4	"爱"	24.5	Eliminated immediately
Yap Jia Min	5	"飞向你飞向我"	27.5	Sing-off/Safe
Mavis Li Li	6	"姐妹"	29.5	Safe

Also during the live results, Chai was chosen via the computerized system, while the rest advanced via the sing-off method.

==== Week 11: Semi-final (23 March) ====
- Theme: Transmission of love
- Musical guests: Jocie Kwok ("放了爱") and Da Mouth ("永远在身边")
- Sing-off song: "勇气"

The target quota for this week is 30. The contestant with the lowest score below the quota will face immediate elimination, or the highest score above the quota will be immune from public vote and immediately advance to the finals. Of the two remaining contestants, the combined total determined which singer will advance to the final, and which singer was eliminated.

Contestants' performances on the eleventh live show
Contestant	Order	Song	Judges' score	Result
Mavis Li Li	1	"庆幸有你爱我" / "Love Love Love"	28.5	Eliminated immediately
Jarod Lee	2	"走出黑暗的世界" / "完美世界"	33.5	Immune/Advanced
Rachel Chua	3	"牵手" / "你的微笑"	32.5	Sing-off/Eliminated
Yap Jia Min	4	"海阔天空" / "一个像夏天一个像秋天"	29.5	Sing-off/Safe

==== Week 12: Wildcard Round 2 (30 March) ====
- Theme: Judges' choice
- Musical guests: Fahrenheit ("越来越爱" and "寂寞暴走") and Jocie Kwok ("许愿树")
- Sing-off song: "我无所谓"

At the end of the results show on the previous week, each of the four judges select one eliminated contestant from week 8 to 10 to compete in the second Wildcard Round next week; ultimately, Li Li and Ridzwan were not chosen to compete this round and faced permanent elimination.

The contestant with the highest judges' score would be immune from elimination (did not face the public vote) and was immediately reinstated from the competition; of the remaining three contestants, the contestant with a higher combined total would also be reinstated from the competition. Lim did not appear on the judging panel for week 12 due to work commitments in Taiwan with singer A-mei; season one judge Cavin Soh took his place on the panel. Singer Maggie Theng was brought in as the guest judge as well.

Contestants' performances on the twelfth live show
Contestant	Order	Song	Chosen by	Judges' score	Result
Rachel Lim	1	"我不难过"	Ken Tay	34.5	Sing-off/Eliminated
Joselin Ng	2	"失恋无罪"	Li Feihui	39.0	Sing-off/Revived
Benita Cheng	3	"一笑而过"	Xiaohan	33.0	Not revived
Rachel Chua	4	"Open Your Eyes"	Jim Lim	42.5	Immune/Revived

==== Week 13: Final (6/12 April) ====
6 April (Prelude)

- Musical guests: Da Mouth ("国王皇后"), Meixin ("孤单的人总说无所谓") and Fahrenheit ("默默")

All top 12 finalists returned to the stage in this pre-recorded non-elimination performance show. It featured group performances from the finalists as well as a look-back on their journey in the competition.

Contestants' performances on the thirteenth pre-recorded show
Contestant	Order	Song
Rachael Chang, Mavis Li Li & Shelly Tsai	1	"特务J"
Benita Cheng, Rachel Lim & Mavis Li Li	2	"站在高岗上"
Ridhwan Azman, Rachael Chang, Benita Cheng & Jeremy Teng	3	"小酒窝"
Ridhwan Azman, Adrian Jorge & Jeremy Teng	4	"失恋阵线联盟"

12 April (Round 1)

- Themes: Alumni duets: oldies songs; contestant quartet: designated song
- Group performance: "I'd Like to Teach the World to Sing (in Perfect Harmony)" (all finalists)
- Musical guests: Rachel Liang ("最幸福的事" and "可以不爱了") and Kelvin Tan ("孤单好吗")

Project SuperStar season one winner Kelvin Tan, singer Maggie Theng, music producer and composer Lee Wei Song and Wu Jia Ming were brought in as the guest judges.

Contestants' performances on the fourteenth live show: round one
Contestant	Order	First song (duet) / Second song (quartet)	Judges' score		Result
Jarod Lee	1	"千言万语" / "小薇" (with Lydia Tan)	64.0	121.0	Safe
Jarod Lee	5	"月光" (with Rachel Chua, Joselin Ng & Yap Jia Min)	57.0	121.0	Safe
Rachel Chua	2	"情人的眼泪" / "Stand by Me" (with Juz-B)	58.5	118.0	Safe
Rachel Chua	6	"月光" (with Jarod Lee, Joselin Ng & Yap Jia Min)	59.5	118.0	Safe
Yap Jia Min	3	"红豆词2000" (with Teresa Tseng)	59.0	117.5	Third/fourth place
Yap Jia Min	7	"月光" (with Rachel Chua, Jarod Lee & Joselin Ng)	58.5	117.5	Third/fourth place
Joselin Ng	4	"梦醒时分" (with Da Feng Chui)	52.5	101.0	Third/fourth place
Joselin Ng	8	"月光" (with Rachel Chua, Jarod Lee & Yap Jia Min)	48.5	101.0	Third/fourth place

12 April (Round 2)

- Theme: Winner's song
- Musical guests: Yoga Lin ("伯乐" and "慢一点")
- Sing-off song: "Super Star"

Contestants' performances on the fourteenth live show: round two
Contestant	Order	Song	Judges' score	Result
Jarod Lee	1	"下一个天亮"	65.0	Winner
Rachel Chua	2	"星星 (I’m Not a Star)"	65.0	Runner-up
