= Campus SuperStar season 2 =

Campus SuperStar
- Season 2
- Hosted by: Dasmond Koh; Pornsak; Fiona Xie (guest); Ben Yeo (guest); Lee Teng (guest); Charlyn Lim (guest)
- Judges: Li Feihui; Jim Lim; Jimmy Ye; Billy Koh (guest); Lee Wei Song (guest)
- Winner: Shawn Tok
- Runner-up: Keely Wee

Release
- Original network: MediaCorp Channel U
- Original release: 28 May – 25 August 2007

Season chronology
- ← Previous; Season 1 Next → Season 3

Campus SuperStar is a Singaporean television music competition to find new singing talent. Contestants are students from secondary schools, junior colleges and institutes of technical education. The second season began airing on MediaCorp Channel U on 28 May 2007 and ended on 25 August 2007. This is the only season of Campus SuperStar where the grand finals were held on Saturday instead of a traditional Sunday.

Li Feihui was the only judge from the previous season to return, and was joined by Jim Lim and Jimmy Ye, who all appeared as judges for the first time. Previous judges Foong Wai See and Cavin Soh did not return, though Soh would later appear as a guest judge in season 3. Dasmond Koh and Pornsak hosted the show.

This is the last season of Campus SuperStar to use male and female categories and have 20 finalists, before reducing to 12 acts and the removal of categories on the following season, which aired in 2009.

The male category winner, Shawn Tok, from Loyang View Secondary School (then called Loyang Secondary School), was declared the winner of the season, beating the female category winner Keely Wee from Victoria Junior College. Tok was the first previously eliminated contestant to win Campus Superstar, and he received a two-year MediaCorp management contract and a cash prize of $2,000.

The season also introduced to two contestants: 18-year old Xu Bin and 16-year old Stella Seah (known in the show as Huixian), who would later become a full-time Mediacorp actor and a successful songwriter, respectively.

== Judges and hosts ==
Li Feihui was confirmed to be returning to the judging panel after judging season one of the show. Season one judges Foong Wai See and Cavin Soh did not return as a judge for the second season. It was announced that two new judges would be brought in to replace both Foong and Soh on the judging panel. Jim Lim and Jimmy Ye were instated as the second and third judge. Jimmy Ye was also brought in as the vocal coach for the contestants.

Season one host Dasmond Koh returned to host the show. Former season one hosts Hong Junyang and Sugianto left the show and their position was taken over by Pornsak.

== Selection process ==
=== Applications and first auditions ===
The audition was opened to students from all secondary schools, junior colleges or institutes of technical education in Singapore. The episode of the auditions was broadcast on 28 May 2007 and was hosted by Fiona Xie. Auditions in front of the judges for season 2 took place at Toa Payoh HDB Hub. Applicants are to report to the venue for the audition in their respective school uniforms. There were approximately 4,500 students applied to take part in the first auditions. The auditions were originally scheduled on 16 March 2007 for the auditionees from the male category and 17 March 2007 for the auditionees from the female category. However, due to overwhelming response, the first auditions were extended for another four days til 19 March 2007. At the end of the first auditions, 100 males and 200 females were put through to the next round of auditions.

=== Second auditions ===
The second auditions took place on 31 March 2007 at MediaCorp. The second auditions were held closed-door and there were five judges judging the contestants. At the end of the auditions, 65 contestants were put through to the third and final round of the auditions.

=== Third auditions ===
The third and final round of auditions were held on 14 April 2007, once again at Toa Payoh HDB Hub. 24 contestants from the male category and 41 contestants from the female category took part in the auditions. At the end of the third auditions, the judges would select 10 contestants each from both categories to form the final 20. The contestants who were selected as the final 20 were put through to the live shows.

== Finalists ==
Key:

– Winner
– Runner-up
– Gender/Category runner-up
– Semi-finalist
– Advanced via Wildcard

Act	Age(s)	School	Gender/Category	Result
Shawn Tok 卓轩正	13	Loyang Secondary School	Male	Winner
Keely Wee 阮诗凯	17	Victoria Junior College	Female	Runner-up
Benjamin Hum 范平庚	16	Saint Hilda's Secondary School	Male	Category Runner-up
Koh Zheng Ning 许政宁	16	Raffles Girls' School (Secondary)	Female	Category Runner-up
Marcus Lee 李俊纬	15	Raffles Institution	Male	Category 3rd place
Seah Hui Xian 谢慧娴	16	CHIJ Katong Convent	Female	Category 3rd place
Ngeow Zi Jie 饶梓杰	16	Gan Eng Seng School	Male	Category 4th place
Joanna Teo 张芮恩	15	CHIJ Secondary (Toa Payoh)	Female	Category 4th place
He Guo Hao 许国豪	16	Queensway Secondary School	Male	Category 5th place
Agnes Low 卢慷倚	16	Chung Cheng High School (Yishun)	Female	Category 5th place
Amy Chang 张宇璇	16	Hwa Chong International School	Female	Category 6th-10th place
Goh Fu Kuan 吴福宽	17	Mayflower Secondary School	Male	Category 6th-10th place
Lin Jia Jun 林佳君	16	Raffles Girls' School (Secondary)	Female	Category 6th-10th place
Lua Jia Qi 赖嘉琪	15	Jurong Secondary School	Female	Category 6th-10th place
Elaine Ng 黄意凌	18	Innova Junior College	Female	Category 6th-10th place
Wilson Thong 唐伟盛	16	Catholic High School	Male	Category 6th-10th place
Javin They 郑全威	18	Nanyang Junior College	Male	Category 6th-10th place
Wan Choon Keat 温俊杰	15	Presbyterian High School	Male	Category 6th-10th place
Xu Bin 徐彬	18	Woodlands Ring Secondary School	Male	Category 6th-10th place
Teri Yeo 杨丽莹	15	Saint Anthony's Canossian Secondary School	Female	Category 6th-10th place

== Live shows ==
The live shows began on 4 June. Each week, the contestants' performances took place on Monday at 8pm and the results were announced on the same night at 11.30pm. As with previous seasons, each live show had a different theme.

The live final included performances from season one top 10 finalists, Project SuperStar season two finalists and Stefanie Sun. Billy Koh and Lee Wei Song were brought in as guest judges during the live final as well.

=== Results summary ===
Colour key

–	Contestant did not perform
–	Contestant received the lowest judges' score
–	Contestant received the lowest combined total and was eliminated
–	Contestant received the highest judges' score or combined total

Weekly results per contestant
Contestant	Week 1		Week 2		Week 3		Week 4		Week 5		Week 6		Week 7		Week 8		Week 9		Week 10		Week 11		Week 12			
Contestant	Week 1		Week 2		Week 3		Week 4		Week 5		Week 6		Week 7		Week 8		Week 9		Week 10		Week 11		Round 1		Round 2	
Contestant	PS	RS	PS	RS	PS	RS	PS	RS	PS	RS	PS	RS	PS	RS	PS	RS	PS	RS	PS	RS	PS	RS	PS	RS	PS	RS
Shawn Tok	1st^{(B)} 24.0	Safe^{(B)}	—	—	—	—	2nd^{(B)} 21.5	4th^{(B)}	Eliminated (week 4)				1st^{(B)} 25.0	1st^{(B)}	—	—	4th^{(B)} 20.5	Safe^{(B)}	1st^{(B)} 24.0	Safe^{(B)}	2nd^{(B)} 22.0	Safe^{(B)}	2nd^{(B)} 34.5	1st^{(B)} 58.0%	1st 33.0	Winner; 58.0%
Keely Wee	2nd^{(G)} 21.0	Safe^{(G)}	—	—	3rd^{(G)} 19.0	Safe^{(G)}	—	—	—	—	3rd^{(G)} 19.0	Safe^{(G)}	—	—	2nd^{(G)} 19.5	Safe^{(G)}	—	—	3rd^{(G)} 19.5	Safe^{(G)}	1st^{(G)} 25.5	Safe^{(G)}	1st^{(G)} 37.5	1st^{(G)} 56.0%	2nd 32.0	Runner-up; 42.0%
Benjamin Hum	—	—	1st^{(B)} 23.0	Safe^{(B)}	3rd^{(B)} 21.5	Safe^{(B)}	—	—	1st^{(B)} 23.5	Safe^{(B)}	—	—	—	—	—	—	2nd^{(B)} 21.5	Safe^{(B)}	3rd^{(B)} 22.0	Safe^{(B)}	3rd^{(B)} 20.0	Safe^{(B)}	1st^{(B)} 40.0	2nd^{(B)} 42.0%	Eliminated (week 12)	
Koh Zheng Ning	1st^{(G)} 21.5	Safe^{(G)}	—	—	2nd^{(G)} 20.0	Safe^{(G)}	—	—	3rd^{(G)} 19.0	Safe^{(G)}	—	—	—	—	5th^{(G)} 13.5	Safe^{(G)}	—	—	1st^{(G)} 20.5	Safe^{(G)}	3rd^{(G)} 18.5	Safe^{(G)}	2nd^{(G)} 35.0	2nd^{(G)} 44.0%	Eliminated (week 12)	
Marcus Lee	2nd^{(B)} 21.0	Safe^{(B)}	—	—	—	—	2nd^{(B)} 21.5	Safe^{(B)}	—	—	1st^{(B)} 22.5	Safe^{(B)}	—	—	—	—	2nd^{(B)} 21.5	Safe^{(B)}	2nd^{(B)} 23.5	Safe^{(B)}	1st^{(B)} 23.0	3rd^{(B)}	Eliminated (week 11)			
Seah Hui Xian	—	—	3rd^{(G)} 21.5	Safe^{(G)}	—	—	1st^{(G)} 20.5	Safe^{(G)}	1st^{(G)} 21.5	3rd^{(G)}	Eliminated (week 5)		3rd^{(G)} 18.5	1st^{(G)}	1st^{(G)} 20.0	Safe^{(G)}	—	—	2nd^{(G)} 20.0	Safe^{(G)}	2nd^{(G)} 20.5	3rd^{(G)}	Eliminated (week 11)			
Ngeow Zi Jie	—	—	4th^{(B)} 20.0	Safe^{(B)}	—	—	1st^{(B)} 22.0	Safe^{(B)}	3rd^{(B)} 16.0	Safe^{(B)}	—	—	—	—	—	—	1st^{(B)} 22.0	Safe^{(B)}	4th^{(B)} 17.5	4th^{(B)}	Eliminated (week 10)					
Joanna Teo	5th^{(G)} 19.0	Safe^{(G)}	—	—	—	—	2nd^{(G)} 20.0	Safe^{(G)}	2nd^{(G)} 20.5	Safe^{(G)}	—	—	—	—	4th^{(G)} 19.0	Safe^{(G)}	—	—	4th^{(G)} 18.5	4th^{(G)}	Eliminated (week 10)					
He Guo Hao	—	—	2nd^{(B)} 21.5	Safe^{(B)}	—	—	4th^{(B)} 16.5	Safe^{(B)}	—	—	3rd^{(B)} 18.5	Safe^{(B)}	—	—	—	—	5th^{(B)} 12.5	5th^{(B)}	Eliminated (week 9)							
Agnes Low	3rd^{(G)} 20.5	Safe^{(G)}	—	—	—	—	4th^{(G)} 19.5	Safe^{(G)}	—	—	1st^{(G)} 22.0	Safe^{(G)}	—	—	2nd^{(G)} 19.5	5th^{(G)}	Eliminated (week 8)									
Wan Choon Keat	3rd^{(B)} 20.0	Safe^{(B)}	—	—	4th^{(B)} 17.5	Safe^{(B)}	—	—	—	—	2nd^{(B)} 20.0	3rd^{(B)}	4th^{(B)} 13.5	Bottom five^{(B)}	Not returned (week 7)											
Elaine Ng	—	—	1st^{(G)} 23.5	Safe^{(G)}	1st^{(G)} 23.0	Safe^{(G)}	—	—	—	—	2nd^{(G)} 21.0	3rd^{(G)}	3rd^{(G)} 18.5	Bottom five^{(G)}	Not returned (week 7)											
Goh Fu Kuan	4th^{(B)} 18.5	Safe^{(B)}	—	—	1st^{(B)} 23.5	Safe^{(B)}	—	—	2nd^{(B)} 19.0	3rd^{(B)}	Eliminated (week 5)		2nd^{(B)} 21.5	Bottom five^{(B)}	Not returned (week 7)											
Teri Yeo	—	—	2nd^{(G)} 22.0	Safe^{(G)}	—	—	2nd^{(G)} 20.0	4th^{(G)}	Eliminated (week 4)				2nd^{(G)} 19.0	Bottom five^{(G)}	Not returned (week 7)											
Javin They	—	—	3rd^{(B)} 20.5	Safe^{(B)}	2nd^{(B)} 22.0	4th^{(B)}	Eliminated (week 3)						3rd^{(B)} 19.0	Bottom five^{(B)}	Not returned (week 7)											
Lin Jia Jun	—	—	3rd^{(G)} 21.5	Safe^{(G)}	4th^{(G)} 18.0	4th^{(G)}	Eliminated (week 3)						6th^{(G)} 15.0	Bottom five^{(G)}	Not returned (week 7)											
Wilson Thong	—	—	5th^{(B)} 18.5	5th^{(B)}	Eliminated (week 2)								5th^{(B)} 13.0	Bottom five^{(B)}	Not returned (week 7)											
Amy Chang	—	—	5th^{(G)} 20.0	5th^{(G)}	Eliminated (week 2)								5th^{(G)} 16.0	Bottom five^{(G)}	Not returned (week 7)											
Xu Bin	5th^{(B)} 18.0	5th^{(B)}	Eliminated (week 1)										6th^{(B)} 12.0	Bottom five^{(B)}	Not returned (week 7)											
Lua Jia Qi	4th^{(G)} 20.0	5th^{(G)}	Eliminated (week 1)										1st^{(G)} 19.5	Bottom five^{(G)}	Not returned (week 7)											

=== Live show details ===
==== Week 1: Quarter-final 1 (4 June) ====
For the next seven weeks until the Wildcard rounds, the weightages for the judges and public votes were 70% and 30%, respectively.

- Theme: No theme

Contestants' performances on the first live show
Contestant	Order	Song	Judges' score				Result
Contestant	Order	Song	JL	JY	FH	Total	Result
Female category
Agnes Low	1	"分手快乐"	7.5	7.0	6.0	20.5	Safe
Keely Wee	2	"了解"	8.0	7.0	6.0	21.0	Safe
Lua Jia Qi	3	"本来"	8.0	6.5	5.5	20.0	Eliminated
Joanna Teo	4	"街角的祝福"	7.5	6.5	5.0	19.0	Safe
Koh Zheng Ning	5	"睁一只眼闭一只眼"	7.5	7.0	7.0	21.5	Safe
Male category
Marcus Lee	1	"我可以"	8.0	7.5	5.5	21.0	Safe
Wan Choon Keat	2	"专属天使"	8.5	6.0	5.5	20.0	Safe
Goh Fu Kuan	3	"勇气"	7.0	6.5	5.0	18.5	Safe
Xu Bin	4	"除此之外"	6.5	6.0	5.5	18.0	Eliminated
Shawn Tok	5	"翅膀"	9.0	7.5	7.5	24.0	Safe

==== Week 2: Quarter-final 2 (11 June) ====
- Theme: No theme

Contestants' performances on the second live show
Contestant	Order	Song	Judges' score				Result
Contestant	Order	Song	JL	JY	FH	Total	Result
Female category
Amy Chang	1	"亲爱的你怎么不在我身边"	7.5	6.5	6.0	20.0	Eliminated
Seah Hui Xian	2	"真的"	8.0	7.5	6.0	21.5	Safe
Teri Yeo	3	"过敏"	8.5	7.5	6.0	22.0	Safe
Lin Jia Jun	4	"一个像夏天一个像秋天"	7.5	7.0	7.0	21.5	Safe
Elaine Ng	5	"小手拉大手"	8.0	8.0	7.5	23.5	Safe
Male category
Ngeow Zi Jie	1	"只因为你"	7.5	6.5	6.0	20.0	Safe
Benjamin Hum	2	"原来"	8.0	8.0	7.0	23.0	Safe
Wilson Thong	3	"着迷"	7.0	6.0	5.5	18.5	Eliminated
He Guo Hao	4	"男佣"	8.0	7.5	6.0	21.5	Safe
Javin They	5	"Love Story"	8.0	6.5	6.0	20.5	Safe

==== Week 3: Quarter-final 3 (18 June) ====
- Theme: No theme

Contestants' performances on the third live show
Contestant	Order	Song	Judges' score				Result
Contestant	Order	Song	JL	JY	FH	Total	Result
Female category
Lin Jia Jun	1	"Honey Honey"	6.0	6.5	5.5	18.0	Eliminated
Elaine Ng	2	"一眼万年"	7.0	8.5	7.5	23.0	Safe
Keely Wee	3	"原来爱情这么伤"	6.0	7.0	6.0	19.0	Safe
Koh Zheng Ning	4	"逆光"	6.5	7.5	6.0	20.0	Safe
Male category
Wan Choon Keat	1	"背叛"	5.5	6.5	5.5	17.5	Safe
Javin They	2	"非你莫属"	7.5	8.0	6.5	22.0	Eliminated
Benjamin Hum	3	"枫"	7.0	8.0	6.5	21.5	Safe
Goh Fu Kuan	4	"两只恋人"	7.5	8.5	7.5	23.5	Safe

==== Week 4: Quarter-final 4 (25 June) ====
- Theme: No theme

Contestants' performances on the fourth live show
Contestant	Order	Song	Judges' score				Result
Contestant	Order	Song	JL	JY	FH	Total	Result
Female category
Seah Hui Xian	1	"好听"	6.5	8.0	6.0	20.5	Safe
Agnes Low	2	"讨厌"	6.0	7.0	6.5	19.5	Safe
Teri Yeo	3	"心动"	7.5	6.5	6.0	20.0	Eliminated
Joanna Teo	4	"不痛"	7.0	7.0	6.0	20.0	Safe
Male category
He Guo Hao	1	"大城小爱"	6.0	5.5	5.0	16.5	Safe
Ngeow Zi Jie	2	"旋律"	7.0	8.0	7.0	22.0	Safe
Shawn Tok	3	"星晴"	7.5	7.0	7.0	21.5	Eliminated
Marcus Lee	4	"其实还爱你"	7.0	8.0	6.5	21.5	Safe

==== Week 5: Quarter-final 5 (2 July) ====
- Theme: No theme
- Group performances: "怎么办" (performed by Koh Zheng Ning, Seah Hui Xian and Joanna Teo) and "我又初恋了" (performed by Goh Fu Kuan, Benjamin Hum and Ngeow Zi Jie)

Contestants' performances on the fifth live show
Contestant	Order	Song	Judges' score				Result
Contestant	Order	Song	JL	JY	FH	Total	Result
Female category
Seah Hui Xian	1	"喜欢你没道理"	7.0	8.0	6.5	21.5	Eliminated
Koh Zheng Ning	2	"Super No. 1"	6.5	7.0	5.5	19.0	Safe
Joanna Teo	3	"理想情人"	7.5	7.0	6.0	20.5	Safe
Male category
Ngeow Zi Jie	1	"On the Way"	5.5	5.5	5.0	16.0	Safe
Benjamin Hum	2	"Superman"	8.0	8.0	7.5	23.5	Safe
Goh Fu Kuan	3	"只对你说"	6.5	6.5	6.0	19.0	Eliminated

==== Week 6: Quarter-final 6 (9 July) ====
- Theme: No theme
- Group performances: "马德里不思议" (performed by Agnes Low, Elaine Ng and Keely Wee) and "超喜欢你" (performed by He Guo Hao, Marcus Lee and Wan Choon Keat)

Contestants' performances on the sixth live show
Contestant	Order	Song	Judges' score				Result
Contestant	Order	Song	JL	JY	FH	Total	Result
Female category
Elaine Ng	1	"倒带"	7.0	7.5	6.5	21.0	Eliminated
Agnes Low	2	"一比一"	6.5	8.0	7.5	22.0	Safe
Keely Wee	3	"逃亡"	6.0	7.0	6.0	19.0	Safe
Male category
Wan Choon Keat	1	"难道"	6.5	7.5	6.0	20.0	Eliminated
He Guo Hao	2	"幸福猎人"	6.5	6.0	6.0	18.5	Safe
Marcus Lee	3	"空秋千"	6.5	8.0	8.0	22.5	Safe

==== Week 7: Revival round (16 July) ====
- Theme: No theme

The first 12 singers who were eliminated from the first six weeks returned to the stage to perform for the Wildcard round. The contestant who received the highest combined score from either the male and female categories would be reinstated from the competition.

Contestant	Order	Song	Judges' score				Result
Contestant	Order	Song	JL	JY	FH	Total	Result
Female category
Lua Jia Qi	1	"超快感"	7.0	7.0	5.5	19.5	Not revived
Teri Yeo	2	"左边"	7.0	6.0	6.0	19.0	Not revived
Amy Chang	3	"那年夏天宁静的海"	6.0	4.5	5.5	16.0	Not revived
Lin Jia Jun	4	"有一天我会"	5.5	4.0	5.5	15.0	Not revived
Seah Hui Xian	5	"C大调"	6.0	6.5	6.0	18.5	Revived
Elaine Ng	6	"好眼泪坏眼泪"	6.5	6.5	5.5	18.5	Not revived
Male category
Wilson Thong	1	"当你孤单你会想起谁"	5.0	4.0	4.0	13.0	Not revived
Wan Choon Keat	2	"忘记"	5.0	4.0	4.5	13.5	Not revived
Goh Fu Kuan	3	"爱爱爱"	6.5	8.0	7.0	21.5	Not revived
Xu Bin	4	"简单爱"	4.5	3.5	4.0	12.0	Not revived
Javin They	5	"给我你的爱"	6.0	6.5	6.5	19.0	Not revived
Shawn Tok	6	"木乃伊"	7.5	9.0	8.5	25.0	Revived

==== Week 8: Semi-final 1 (23 July) ====
From this week until the Grand Finals, the weightage for judges and public votes were 30% and 70%, respectively.

- Theme: Songs from local drama series

Contestants' performances on the eighth live show
Contestant	Order	Song	Drama series	Judges' score				Result
Contestant	Order	Song	Drama series	JL	JY	FH	Total	Result
Female category
Agnes Low	1	"勾勾手"	Love Concierge	6.5	7.0	6.0	19.5	Eliminated
Seah Hui Xian	2	"风铃"	Rhapsody in Blue	6.5	7.5	6.0	20.0	Safe
Koh Zheng Ning	3	"一千年以后"	Zero to Hero	5.0	4.0	4.5	13.5	Safe
Keely Wee	4	"触摸"	The Shining Star	7.0	6.5	6.0	19.5	Safe
Joanna Teo	5	"爱无力"	Dream Chasers	6.5	7.0	5.5	19.0	Safe

==== Week 9: Semi-final 2 (30 July) ====
- Theme: Songs from local drama series

Contestants' performances on the ninth live show
Contestant	Order	Song	Drama series	Judges' score				Result
Contestant	Order	Song	Drama series	JL	JY	FH	Total	Result
Male category
Ngeow Zi Jie	1	"主题曲"	The Beginning	7.0	7.5	7.5	22.0	Safe
Benjamin Hum	2	"Guardian Angel"	P.S... I Luv U	6.5	8.0	7.0	21.5	Safe
He Guo Hao	3	"大男人小女孩"	Kinship	5.0	3.5	4.0	12.5	Eliminated
Shawn Tok	4	"满天星"	A New Life	7.0	7.0	6.5	20.5	Safe
Marcus Lee	5	"知足"	A Promise for Tomorrow	6.5	8.0	7.0	21.5	Safe

==== Week 10: Semi-final 3 (6 August) ====
- Theme: Uptempo dance music

Contestants' performances on the tenth live show
Contestant	Order	Song	Judges' score				Result
Contestant	Order	Song	JL	JY	FH	Total	Result
Female category
Keely Wee	1	"Super Model"	6.5	7.0	6.0	19.5	Safe
Koh Zheng Ning	2	"大风吹"	7.0	7.5	6.0	20.5	Safe
Seah Hui Xian	3	"DA DA DA"	6.5	7.0	6.5	20.0	Safe
Joanna Teo	4	"狠狠爱"	6.0	7.0	5.5	18.5	Eliminated
Male category
Ngeow Zi Jie	1	"流行主教"	6.0	6.0	5.5	17.5	Eliminated
Marcus Lee	2	"呛司呛司"	7.5	8.5	7.5	23.5	Safe
Benjamin Hum	3	"精舞门"	7.0	8.0	7.0	22.0	Safe
Shawn Tok	4	"恋爱ING"	7.5	9.0	7.5	24.0	Safe

==== Week 11: Semi-final 4 (13 August) ====
- Theme: Songs composed or performed by the judges

Contestants' performances on the eleventh live show
Contestant	Order	Song	Judges' score				Result
Contestant	Order	Song	JL	JY	FH	Total	Result
Female category
Seah Hui Xian	1	"Love Me Again"	6.5	7.5	6.5	20.5	Eliminated
Koh Zheng Ning	2	"我的爱"	6.5	6.0	6.0	18.5	Safe
Keely Wee	3	"平常心"	8.0	9.0	8.5	25.5	Safe
Male category
Shawn Tok	1	"爱你不是爱给别人看"	7.5	7.5	7.0	22.0	Safe
Marcus Lee	2	"爱如潮水"	7.0	8.5	7.5	23.0	Eliminated
Benjamin Hum	3	"下雪"	6.5	7.0	6.5	20.0	Safe

==== Week 12: Final (20/25 August) ====
20 August (Prelude)

- Musical guests: Muhammad Firhan, Muhammad Nazreen and Muhammad Ridhwan ("空秋千")

All top 20 finalists returned to the stage in this pre-recorded non-elimination performance show. It featured group performances from the finalists as well as a look-back on their journey in the competition.

Contestants' performances on the twelfth pre-recorded show
Contestant	Order	Song
Agnes Low, Lua Jia Qi & Seah Hui Xian	1	"Ring Ring Ring"
Marcus Lee, Ngeow Zi Jie & Javin They	2	"记得爱"
Goh Fu Kuan & Elaine Ng	3	"被风吹过的夏天"
Joanna Teo & Teri Yeo	4	"原点"

25 August (Round 1)

- Themes: Designated song; uptempo dance music
- Group performance: "姐姐妹妹站起来" / "伦敦大桥垮下来" / "爱上爱的味道" (all finalists from female category except Koh Zheng Ning and Keely Wee)
- Musical guests: Season one top 10 finalists ("By Now") and Jeremy Kwan, Kelvin Soon, Nat Tan, Tang Lingyi, Jeff Teay, Carrie Yeo and Zhang Lesheng ("摇摇民谣" / "恋之憩" / "想着你的感觉" / "懈逅" / "细水长流")

Music producer and composer Billy Koh and Lee Wei Song were brought in as the guest judges. Guest hosting roles were also brought in during the live final. It featured Lee Teng reporting from Keely Wee's school, Victoria Junior College; Charlyn Lim from Shawn Tok's school, Loyang Secondary School; Fiona Xie from Benjamin Hum's school, Saint Hilda's Secondary School; and Ben Yeo from Koh Zheng Ning's school, Raffles Girls' School (Secondary).

Contestants' performances on the thirteenth live show: round one
Contestant	Order	First song	Order	Second song	Judges' score						Result
Contestant	Order	First song	Order	Second song	JL	JY	FH	WS	BK	Total	Result
Female category
Koh Zheng Ning	1	"我们的纪念日"	3	"唯舞独尊"	6.5	7.5	7.0	8.0	6.0	35.0	Runner-up
Keely Wee	2	"我们的纪念日"	4	"Mr. Q"	7.0	7.5	7.0	7.0	9.0	37.5	Winner
Male category
Shawn Tok	1	"西界"	3	"终结孤单"	7.0	7.5	7.0	7.0	6.0	34.5	Winner
Benjamin Hum	2	"西界"	4	"3-7-20-1"	7.0	8.0	8.0	8.0	9.0	40.0	Runner-up

25 August (Round 2)

- Themes: Alumni duets; winner's song
- Group performance: "离开地球表面" / "进化论" / "大舌头" (all finalists from male category except Benjamin Hum and Shawn Tok)
- Musical guest: Stefanie Sun ("逆光" and "我怀念的")

Contestants' performances on the thirteenth live show: round two
Contestant	Order	First song (duet)	Order	Second song	Judges' score						Result
Contestant	Order	First song (duet)	Order	Second song	JL	JY	FH	WS	BK	Total	Result
Keely Wee	1	"梁山伯与茱丽叶" (with Ng Chee Yang)	3	"人质"	6.5	7.5	6.0	6.0	6.0	32.0	Runner-up
Shawn Tok	2	"今天你要嫁给我" (with Teresa Tseng)	4	"世界唯一的你"	6.5	7.0	6.5	7.0	6.0	33.0	Winner
