= Campus SuperStar =

2006 Singaporean TV series

- Genre: Reality television
- Presented by: Hong Junyang; Dasmond Koh; Sugianto; Pornsak; Felicia Chin; Lee Teng; Yuan Shuai
- Judges: Foong Wai See; Cavin Soh; Peter Tan; Li Feihui; Jim Lim; Jimmy Ye; Ken Tay; Xiaohan; Dennis Chew
- Voices of: Lin Decheng (season 4)
- Country of origin: Singapore
- Original language: Chinese
- No. of seasons: 4
- No. of episodes: 87

Production
- Production locations: Various (auditions); MediaCorp TV Theatre (live shows)
- Running time: 20–160 minutes

Original release
- Network: MediaCorp Channel U
- Release: 2 January 2006 – 31 March 2013

Campus SuperStar is a Singaporean reality television singing competition to find new singing talent, contested by aspiring singers drawn from public auditions. The show began on 2 January 2006 and is broadcast on MediaCorp Channel U. It is a spin-off of Project SuperStar, and contestants comprise students from secondary schools, junior colleges and institutes of technical education.

The concept of the series is to find aspiring singers studying in secondary schools, junior colleges and institutes of technical education and put them together to compete for the Campus SuperStar title where the winner is determined by the judges and viewers. Winners chosen by judges through judges' score and viewers through telephone, Internet (gift-to-vote), and SMS text voting were Ng Chee Yang, Shawn Tok, Jarod Lee and Bonnie Loo. Winners receive a two-year management contract with MediaCorp and a cash prize ($2,000 for season 1–3, and $5000 for season 4). Season 4 winner also receives an opportunity to perform with Mandopop singer Della Ding Dang in Glass Anatomy the Musical.

The series employs a panel of judges who critique the contestants' performances. The original judges were radio personality Foong Wai See, music producer and composer Li Feihui, singer–actor Cavin Soh and vocal coach Peter Tan. The current season's judging panel consists of singer Jim Lim, lyricist Xiaohan and radio personality Dennis Chew. MediaCorp hosts Pornsak and Lee Teng are the emcee of the show.

As of 2024, episodes for all four seasons are archived in meWatch. The interactive component, online backstage episodes, and on-screen messages were not archived and edited out.

== History ==
Campus SuperStar logo season 1–2

Campus SuperStar logo season 3

Campus SuperStar is a spin-off that was created based on another Singaporean reality television singing competition Project SuperStar, which was in turn inspired by British show Pop Idol. Using the idea from Pop Idol and Project SuperStar, the competition aims to uncover singing talents from full-time students studying in local secondary schools, junior colleges and institutes of technical education. The show debuted in January 2006, about four months after the finale of Project SuperStar season one. It was a big success with the viewing public, especially among the youths and students in Singapore.

Following the success of season one, the show returned about one year later after live final of season one in May 2007 for the second season. The show also returned about one and a half years later after the live final of season two in January 2008 for the third season. Both seasons achieved moderate success and reception from the viewing public.

In 2009, after the live final was held for season three of Campus SuperStar, it was reported by Singapore-based Chinese language newspaper Lianhe Zaobao that MediaCorp Channel U will cease broadcasting of reality television singing competitions, including Campus SuperStar and Project SuperStar, which was slated for a third installment in 2010, but was axed last minute by MediaCorp.

Though the report was made, Campus SuperStar returned to MediaCorp Channel U exactly after four years of hiatus in January 2013 for the fourth season.

== Judges and hosts ==
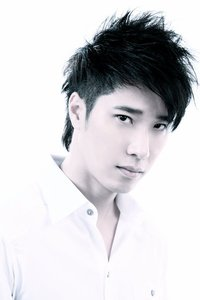
In earlier seasons, Roy Li (left) was one of long-serving judge while Dasmond Koh (right) hosted for the first two seasons.

The original judging panel was Foong Wai See, Roy Li, Cavin Soh and Peter Tan. Foong Wai See, Cavin Soh and Peter Tan left the judging panel after judging one season. They were respectively replaced by two new judges, Jim Lim and Jimmy Ye, who joined Li in season two. Ye did not return in season 3, and replacing him were lyricist Xiaohan and singer Ken Tay. Li and Tay did not return as a judge in season four and Dennis Chew was replaced.

Guest judges may occasionally be introduced, especially in the live finals when the judging panel lineup was increased. Music producer and composer Lee Wei Song was employed as a guest judge for all seasons in the live final. Other guest judges that were instated during the live finals are Lee Shih Shiong in season one, Billy Koh in season two, Kelvin Tan, Maggie Theng and Wu Jia Ming in season three, Li and Eric Moo in season four. Guest judges were also used in the revival rounds for season three, Dawn Yip joined the judging panel in the first revival round, while Cavin Soh and Maggie Theng joined the second.

Dasmond Koh, Hong Junyang and Sugianto were originally hosts in the first season, but in season 2, Hong and Sugianto left the show and they were replaced by Pornsak. Koh and Fiona Xie did not return to host season 3 and were replaced by Felicia Chin and Lee Teng, as well as Yuan Shuai, who served as the online correspondent. Lee and Pornsak returned in season 4 to host the show while Chin and Yuan did not return.

Guest hosts may occasionally be introduced, especially in the live finals when the number of hosts was increased. Ng Hui and Ben Yeo were instated as the guest hosts during the live final in season one. Fiona Xie hosted the auditions episode in season two and later appear again in the live final, alongside Ben Yeo, Lee and Charlyn Lim. Yeo returned as a guest host for the live final in season four.

=== Timeline of judges and hosts ===
Color key
Featured as a resident judge/show host.
Featured as a guest judge/host.
Featured as a guest performer.
Featured as a part-time guest judge.

Campus SuperStar panelists
Name	Seasons			
Name	1	2	3	4
Hosts
Dasmond Koh				
Hong Junyang				
Sugianto				
Ben Yeo				
Christina Lin				
Ng Hui				
Cruz Teng				
Pornsak				
Lee Teng				
Charlyn Lim				
Fiona Xie				
Felicia Chin				
Yuan Shuai				
Judges
Roy Li				
Foong Wai See				
Cavin Soh				
Peter Tan				
Paul Lee				
Lee Shih Shiong				
Kelvin Tan				
Jim Lim				
Jimmy Ye				
Billy Koh				
Xiaohan				
Ken Tay				
Maggie Tseng				
Wu Jiaming				
Dawn Yip				
Dennis Chew				
Nico Chua				

== Format ==
For the first two seasons, competition begins with an audition in front of an audience and judges, and through a series of rounds, judges picked 20 contestants, 10 male and 10 female, to compete in the live shows grouped into three phases, Quarterfinals, Semifinals and Finals. Beginning season three, contestants also had to undergo an online audition (by uploading their audition video online) and through a panel of judges closed-doors, and a reduced 12 contestants (with no equal gender affiliation) selected to compete in the live shows.

In each week, contestants perform in weekly shows in front a panel of judges, who assessed their performances based on their singing technique, body language, and overall presentation, and each judge gave a score out of a maximum 10 (with intervals of 0.1 in season 4, and 0.5 prior to season 4). Contestants also faced the public vote which opened on the start of the performances and closes sometime before the results show. The scoring ratio for judges and public vote varies by season and phases, though additional twists or rule changes adapt to the new scoring system, such as exempting the singer from public vote (season 3) or though a media campaign (season 4). While each week's shows are usually themed, season 4 added a mandate on song requirement, where contestants can select only the songs that were either created, composed or sung by Singaporeans.

These contestants are batched by halves to compete in three out of six weeks of Quarterfinals in front of a panel of judges and faced the public vote, and these combined scores determined which singer from each gender would be eliminated that night on the result show (or at the show's conclusion, in season 4). The scores from the judges and public varies each season and phase,. The voting window opens on the show's start and ends after a certain time before the results are announced, cumulating to the elimination of a contestant who garnered the lowest combined score; though additional twists or rule changes adapt to the new scoring system are employed, such as exempting the singer from public vote (season 3) or though a media campaign (season 4).

For the first three seasons, previously eliminated contestants can also advance to the semifinals by competing in the Revival round and only the highest scoring contestant per gender will advance. In season 3, owing to the removal of gender-based categories, any two contestants regardless of gender will also advance to the semifinals as well. There are no Revival rounds in season 4.

In each week shows, combined scores narrows to a final group of four contestants and eventually declares a winner. For the first two seasons, one contestant per gender would advance to the final round decider, but beginning season three due to a change in format, any two contestants with the highest score would advance. These two contestants compete head-to-head with prior scores reset, and the winner is decided based on which contestant had a higher combined score.

=== Voting system ===
For the first two seasons, with the exception of season 2's Quarterfinals, the ratio for judges' scores and public votes were 30%-70%. Season 2's Quarterfinals and most other non-finale shows have its ratios reversed to 70%-30%. The finals since season 3 had an equal ratio, meaning both the judges and public votes were given an equal saying.

In season 4, another voting window opened after the results shows and until the day before the next live shows, where public can download streams of contestant's performances gift-to votes, much like The Voice's iTunes Store purchases. For the first two live shows that season, contestants had to undergo a live radio show performance and a photoshoot prior to the live shows; as such, the scoring ratio for the judges, public vote, radio show, and photoshoot, constituted 50%, 30%, 15% and 5% of the combined score, respectively.

=== Prizes ===
The winner of Campus SuperStar is awarded a two-year management contract with MediaCorp and a cash prize ($2,000 for season 1 to 3, and $5,000 for season 4). Season 4 winner also receives an opportunity to perform with Mandopop singer Della Ding Dang in Glass Anatomy the Musical. Other contestants may also be offered artiste contract with MediaCorp, but this is not guaranteed.

== Series overview ==
To date, four seasons have been broadcast, as summarised below.

Contestant in (or school represented by a contestant in) male category or contestant is (or school represented by) a male
Contestant in (or school represented by a contestant in) female category or contestant is (or school represented by) a female

Season	Start	Finish	Winner	Runner-up	Third place	Winning school	Main hosts	Guest hosts	Main judges	Guest judges	Sponsors
One	2 January 2006	3 April 2006	Ng Chee Yang	Teresa Tseng	Renfred Ng	Hwa Chong Institution	Hong Junyang; Dasmond Koh; Sugianto	Christina Lin; Ng Hui; Cruz Teng; Ben Yeo	Foong Wai See; Cavin Soh; Peter Tan; Li Feihui	Lee Shih Shiong; Lee Wei Song	12wap M&M's; Clean & Clear
One	2 January 2006	3 April 2006	Ng Chee Yang	Teresa Tseng	Geraldine See	Hwa Chong Institution	Hong Junyang; Dasmond Koh; Sugianto	Christina Lin; Ng Hui; Cruz Teng; Ben Yeo	Foong Wai See; Cavin Soh; Peter Tan; Li Feihui	Lee Shih Shiong; Lee Wei Song	12wap M&M's; Clean & Clear
Two	28 May 2007	25 August 2007	Shawn Tok	Keely Wee	Benjamin Hum	Loyang Secondary School	Dasmond Koh; Pornsak	Fiona Xie; Ben Yeo; Lee Teng; Charlyn Lim	Li Feihui; Jim Lim; Jimmy Ye	Billy Koh; Lee Wei Song	Marigold Peel Fresh; M&M's; Mentos; Singapore Media Academy
Two	28 May 2007	25 August 2007	Shawn Tok	Keely Wee	Koh Zheng Ning	Loyang Secondary School	Dasmond Koh; Pornsak	Fiona Xie; Ben Yeo; Lee Teng; Charlyn Lim	Li Feihui; Jim Lim; Jimmy Ye	Billy Koh; Lee Wei Song	Marigold Peel Fresh; M&M's; Mentos; Singapore Media Academy
Three	4 January 2009	12 April 2009	Jarod Lee	Rachel Chua	Joselin Ng	Ngee Ann Secondary School	Pornsak; Felicia Chin; Lee Teng; Yuan Shuai^{1}	—	Li Feihui; Jim Lim; Ken Tay; Xiaohan	Dawn Yip; Cavin Soh; Maggie Theng; Lee Wei Song; Kelvin Tan; Wu Jia Ming	Acnes Medicated Skincare; London Choco Roll
Three	4 January 2009	12 April 2009	Jarod Lee	Rachel Chua	Yap Jia Min	Ngee Ann Secondary School	Pornsak; Felicia Chin; Lee Teng; Yuan Shuai^{1}	—	Li Feihui; Jim Lim; Ken Tay; Xiaohan	Dawn Yip; Cavin Soh; Maggie Theng; Lee Wei Song; Kelvin Tan; Wu Jia Ming	Acnes Medicated Skincare; London Choco Roll
Four	3 January 2013	31 March 2013	Bonnie Loo	Gwendolyn Lee	Leonard Lim	Riverside Secondary School	Pornsak; Lee Teng	Ben Yeo	Jim Lim; Xiaohan; Dennis Chew	Nico Chua; Lee Wei Song; Li Feihui; Eric Moo	Tic Tac; Calbee; Yeo's; MDIS
Four	3 January 2013	31 March 2013	Bonnie Loo	Gwendolyn Lee	Lim Yong Hang	Riverside Secondary School	Pornsak; Lee Teng	Ben Yeo	Jim Lim; Xiaohan; Dennis Chew	Nico Chua; Lee Wei Song; Li Feihui; Eric Moo	Tic Tac; Calbee; Yeo's; MDIS

Notes

1. Yuan Shuai presented backstage for the performance shows on Mondays.

== List of finalists ==
Shawn Tok won the second season.

As of March 2013, there have been four completed seasons. During every season, the final round of competition features twenty singers for season one and two or twelve singers for season three and four. A total of 64 contestants have reached the finals of their season.

During the first two seasons, the finalists were split into two categories: male and female. For season three to four, the groupings were scrapped and the finalists were selected without taking into consideration of the gender. As of season four, three out of four winners were male contestants, while the other was a female contestant.

Name	Age	School	Season	Category	Finished
Ridhwan Azman	15	Bendemeer Secondary School	3	N/A	7th
Amy Chang	16	Hwa Chong International School	2	Female	17th (joint)
Rachael Chang	15	Jurong West Secondary School	3	N/A	9th (joint)
Phoebe Chee	14	Greendale Secondary School	4	N/A	5th
Chen Yi Yuan	15	Presbyterian High School	1	Male	9th (joint)
Benita Cheng	15	Pasir Ris Crest Secondary School	3	N/A	8th
Choo Siew Ping	15	Guangyang Secondary School	1	Female	17th (joint)
Rachel Chua	14	Anglican High School	3	N/A	2nd
Yvonne Chua	16	Victoria Junior College	1	Female	9th (joint)
Goh Fu Kuan	17	Mayflower Secondary School	2	Male	11th (joint)
Sheena Goh	17	Saint Andrew's Junior College	1	Female	13th (joint)
Shermaine Goh	17	Tampines Junior College	1	Female	13th (joint)
He Guo Hao	16	Queensway Secondary School	2	Male	9th (joint)
Ho Chee Mun	17	Saint Andrew's Junior College	1	Male	17th (joint)
Hong Yu Yang	16	Manjusri Secondary School	1	Male	7th (joint)
Alejandro Hou	15	Bendemeer Secondary School	1	Male	17th (joint)
Adriano Huang	17	Temasek Secondary School	1	Male	5th (joint)
Benjamin Hum	16	Saint Hilda's Secondary School	2	Male	3rd (joint)
Adrian Jorge	15	Manjusri Secondary School	3	N/A	12th
Koh Bee Kwee	16	Temasek Junior College	1	Female	17th (joint)
Koh Zheng Ning	16	Raffles Girls' School (Secondary)	2	Female	3rd (joint)
Gwendolyn Lee	14	Nan Chiau High School	4	N/A	2nd
Jarod Lee	13	Ngee Ann Secondary School	3	N/A	1st
Leon Lee	15	Seng Kang Secondary School	4	N/A	9th (joint)
Marcus Lee	15	Raffles Institution	2	Male	5th (joint)
Lee Yin Wei	15	Raffles Institution	1	Male	11th (joint)
Joseph Li	18	Tampines Junior College	4	N/A	9th (joint)
Mavis Li Li	18	Deyi Secondary School	3	N/A	5th
Kenneth Lim	18	ITE College West	1	Male	13th (joint)
Leonard Lim	17	Saint Andrew's Junior College	4	N/A	3rd (joint)
Rachel Lim	14	Methodist Girls' School	3	N/A	6th
Lim Yong Hang	19	ITE College East	4	N/A	3rd (joint)
Lin Jia Jun	16	Raffles Girls' School (Secondary)	2	Female	14th (joint)
Bonnie Loo	18	Riverside Secondary School	4	N/A	1st
Valerie Loo	17	Innova Junior College	4	N/A	7th (joint)
Agnes Low	16	Chung Cheng High School (Yishun)	2	Female	9th (joint)
Lua Jia Qi	15	Jurong Secondary School	2	Female	17th (joint)
Ng Chee Yang	16	Hwa Chong Institution	1	Male	1st
Elaine Ng	18	Innova Junior College	2	Female	11th (joint)
Ng Imm Khim	13	East Spring Secondary School	1	Female	7th (joint)
Joselin Ng	15	Chua Chu Kang Secondary School	3	N/A	3rd (joint)
Renfred Ng	15	Peicai Secondary School	1	Male	3rd (joint)
Ng Yang Ce	15	Jurong Secondary School	1	Female	11th (joint)
Ng Yuan Yi	15	Bukit Batok Secondary School	4	N/A	9th (joint)
Ngeow Zi Jie	18	Gan Eng Seng School	2	Male	7th (joint)
Seah Hui Xian	16	CHIJ Katong Convent	2	Female	5th (joint)
Geraldine See	17	ITE College West	1	Female	3rd (joint)
Clara Tan	15	Dunman High School	1	Female	5th (joint)
Tan Mei Kee	15	Chung Cheng High School (Main)	4	N/A	9th (joint)
Samuel Tan	17	Nanyang Junior College	1	Male	13th (joint)
Jeremy Teng	14	Commonwealth Secondary School	3	N/A	9th (joint)
Joanna Teo	15	CHIJ Secondary (Toa Payoh)	2	Female	7th (joint)
Javin They	18	Nanyang Junior College	2	Male	14th (joint)
Wilson Thong	16	Catholic High School	2	Male	17th (joint)
Shawn Tok	13	Loyang Secondary School	2	Male	1st
Shelly Tsai	14	Hwa Chong International School	3	N/A	11th
Teresa Tseng	15	CHIJ Katong Convent	1	Female	2nd
Wan Choon Keat	15	Presbyterian High School	2	Male	11th (joint)
Keely Wee	17	Victoria Junior College	2	Female	2nd
Wong Yu Ting	15	Yishun Secondary School	4	N/A	6th
Xu Bin	18	Woodlands Ring Secondary School	2	Male	17th (joint)
Yap Jia Min	15	Anglo-Chinese Junior College	3	N/A	3rd (joint)
Yeo Min	16	Raffles Institution	4	N/A	7th (joint)
Teri Yeo	15	Saint Anthony's Canossian Secondary School	2	Female	14th (joint)

== See also ==
- SPOP Sing! - a similar campus-based singing competition, and expanded eligibility of polytechnics/school universities
