= Campus SuperStar season 4 =

Campus SuperStar
- Season 4
- Hosted by: Pornsak; Lee Teng; Ben Yeo (guest)
- Judges: Jim Lim; Xiaohan; Dennis Chew; Nico Chua (guest); Lee Wei Song (guest); Li Feihui (guest); Eric Moo (guest)
- Winner: Bonnie Loo
- Runner-up: Gwendolyn Lee

Release
- Original network: MediaCorp Channel U
- Original release: 3 January – 31 March 2013

Season chronology
- ← Previous; Season 3

Campus SuperStar is a Singaporean television music competition to find new singing talent. Contestants are students from secondary schools, junior colleges and institutes of technical education. The fourth season debuted on Y.E.S. 93.3FM on 3 January 2013, and began airing on MediaCorp Channel U on 18 February 2013 and ended on 31 March 2013.

Jim Lim and Xiaohan were the two judges from the previous season to return, and were joined by Y.E.S. 93.3FM radio personality Dennis Chew, who appeared as a judge for the first time. Previous judges Li Feihui and Ken Tay did not return. Previous season hosts Pornsak and Lee Teng returned to host the show.

Bonnie Loo, an 18-year-old student from Riverside Secondary School, was named the winner, and Gwendolyn Lee from Nan Chiau High School named as runner-up. This season marked the first time in Campus Superstar history both the winner and runner-up were females; Loo also became the series' first female winner, and she received a two-year Mediacorp management contract, a cash prize of $5,000, and the opportunity to perform with Mandopop singer Della Ding Dang in Glass Anatomy the Musical.

== Judges and hosts ==
Jim Lim and Xiaohan were confirmed to be returning to the judging panel after judging season three of the show. Li Feihui was announced not to return for his fourth year as a judge, but would later appear in the grand finals as a guest judge. Ken Tay, who appear as a judge on the last season also did not return. It was announced that Y.E.S. 93.3FM radio personality Dennis Chew would replace Li and Tay on the judging panel as the third judge.

Season three hosts Pornsak and Lee Teng returned to host the show. Former season hosts Felicia Chin and Yuan Shuai did not return to host.

== Selection process ==
The audition was opened to students studying in secondary schools, junior colleges or institutes of technical education in Singapore. Preliminary auditions were held online from 15 November to 9 December 2012. A group of online auditionees were handpicked and invited by the judges to attend the first round of closed-door judges auditions from 11 to 16 December 2012. Successful auditionees from the first judges auditions round advanced to the final round of judges auditions. Twelve finalists were chosen by the judges at the end of the final judges auditions round.

== Finalists ==
Key:

– Winner
– Runner-up
– Third place

Act	Age(s)	School	Result
Bonnie Loo 罗美仪	18	Riverside Secondary School	Winner
Gwendolyn Lee 李欣纹	14	Nan Chiau High School	Runner-up
Leonard Lim 林健辉	17	Saint Andrew's Junior College^{1}	3rd–4th place
Lim Yong Hang 林永行	19	ITE College East	3rd–4th place
Phoebe Chee 朱舒祺	14	Greendale Secondary School	5th place
Wong Yu Ting 王裕婷	15	Yishun Secondary School	6th place
Valerie Loo 吕亦佳	17	Innova Junior College	7th–8th place
Yeo Min 杨敏	16	Raffles Institution^{2}	7th–8th place
Leon Lee 李勇强	15	Seng Kang Secondary School	9th–12th place
Joseph Li 李佳琛	18	Tampines Junior College	9th–12th place
Ng Yuan Yi 黄苑仪	15	Bukit Batok Secondary School	9th–12th place
Tan Mei Kee 陈美琪	15	Chung Cheng High School (Main)	9th–12th place

*^1 Lim originally represented Yio Chu Kang Secondary School in the competition before admitting to Saint Andrew's Junior College via the Joint Admissions Exercise.
*^2 Yeo originally represented Raffles Girls' School (Secondary) in the competition before admitting directly to Raffles Institution via the Integrated Programme.

== Live radio shows, print photo shoot and live television shows ==
Contrary to previous seasons, the competition was split into three stages: the live radio shows, print photo shoot and live television shows. The change in the competition format was to give all finalists an opportunity to gain exposure on radio, print and television. In another change to the format of previous years, all finalists are required to perform songs performed or composed by homegrown talents for the entire competition to showcase and promote local music. The Revival round, a round where singers perform to reinstate them from the competition, did not return this season.

The live radio shows started on 3 January 2013 and ended on 31 January 2013. The performance shows were held via Y.E.S. 93.3FM. Each week, three finalists performed on the first four weeks, with the voting lines opening before the performances. The results were based solely on the public votes. The results were announced on week five, with the contestant receiving the most public votes awarded with "鲜声夺人奖" sponsored by Tic Tac. The top three contestants based on judges' score were also announced, though the scores has no impact towards the overall results.

Guest judging role was brought in during the live radio shows. Y.E.S. 93.3FM radio personality Nico Chua was brought in as the guest judge.

The voting for print photo shoot started on 28 January 2013 and ended on 13 February 2013. Prior to the voting window, all finalists went through a full makeover by stylists from I-Weekly. Individual photos of finalists that were taken during the photo shoot were then uploaded to I-Weekly's Facebook page. Public votes, I-Weekly editorial team votes and Facebook photo likes, constituted 50%, 40% and 10% of the final results, respectively. The result was announced on 16 February 2013, during a meet-and-greet session at Alexandra Retail Centre; the singer with the highest combined total was awarded "最i上镜奖".

The live television shows started on 18 February 2013 and ended 31 March 2013. As with previous seasons, each live show had a different theme. Each week, the contestants perform on Monday at 8:00 pm or Sunday at 8:30 pm (live final), with the voting lines opening before the performances. The results are announced immediately after the performance shows at 9:00 pm, with the contestants in the bottom two or the one with the lower combined total being announced and eliminated. For the top 12 performance shows, judges' score, public votes and scores accumulated from the live radio shows and print photo shoot, constituted 50%, 30%, 15% and 5% of the combined total, respectively. For top 8, top 6 and top 5 performance shows, judges' score constituted 70% of the combined total and the remaining 30% were determined by the public votes and gift-to-votes from the official website. Judges' score and public votes with gift-to-votes from the official website constituted 50% each to the combined total of the final.

The live television shows often featured guest performances. The first live television show included performance from Taiwanese girl group Popu Lady. There was no guest performer on the second live television show and footage from the audition rounds were shown instead. On the third live television show, British Singaporean singer Ming Bridges performed. Season one finalists Hong Yu Yang, Renfred Ng and Geraldine See performed on the fourth live television show, while SuperBand season two runner-up Da Feng Chui performed on the fifth. Mandopop singer Della Ding Dang, former Campus SuperStar judge Li Feihui and singer Eric Moo performed for the live final.

Guest judging roles were brought in during the live final. Music producer and composer Lee Wei Song, former judge Li Feihui and singer Eric Moo were brought in as the guest judges.

=== Results summary ===
Colour key

–	Contestant did not face the public vote or perform
–	Contestant received the lowest judges' score or was in the bottom two based on judges' score
–	Contestant received the lowest combined total or was in the bottom two and was eliminated
–	Contestant received the highest judges' score or combined total

Weekly results per contestant
Contestant	Week 1		Week 2		Week 3		Week 4		Week 5		Week 6			
Contestant	Week 1		Week 2		Week 3		Week 4		Week 5		Round 1		Round 2	
Contestant	PS	RS	PS	RS	PS	RS	PS	RS	PS	RS	PS	RS	PS	RS
Bonnie Loo	1st 56.20	Safe	—	—	2nd 24.4	Safe	1st 25.0	Safe	2nd 24.8	Safe	1st 96.8	Safe	1st 110.4	Winner
Gwendolyn Lee	—	—	2nd 49.17	Safe	1st 25.2	Safe	3rd 23.7	Safe	5th 21.3	Safe	4th 79.5	Safe	2nd 66.0	Runner-up
Lim Yong Hang	3rd 49.17	Safe	—	—	4th 22.4	Safe	4th 23.6	Safe	3rd 23.6	Safe	2nd 90.2	Bottom two	Eliminated (week 6)	
Leonard Lim	—	—	1st 56.03	Safe	3rd 24.3	Safe	5th 23.5	Safe	1st 26.4	Safe	3rd 83.7	Bottom two	Eliminated (week 6)	
Phoebe Chee	2nd 49.23	Safe	—	—	5th 20.9	Safe	2nd 23.9	Safe	4th 22.1	5th	Eliminated (week 5)			
Wong Yu Ting	—	—	5th 45.97	Safe	6th 20.7	Safe	6th 20.3	6th	Eliminated (week 4)					
Valerie Loo	—	—	4th 46.50	Safe	8th 17.7	Bottom two	Eliminated (week 3)							
Yeo Min	5th 44.20	Safe	—	—	7th 18.7	Bottom two	Eliminated (week 3)							
Tan Mei Kee	—	—	3rd 47.30	Bottom two	Eliminated (week 2)									
Joseph Li	—	—	6th 43.07	Bottom two	Eliminated (week 2)									
Ng Yuan Yi	6th 42.47	Bottom two	Eliminated (week 1)											
Leon Lee	4th 45.47	Bottom two	Eliminated (week 1)											

=== Live radio show details ===
- Theme: Unplugged songs

Y.E.S. 93.3FM radio personality Nico Chua was brought in as the guest judge.

Contestants' performances on the first to fourth live radio shows
Contestant	Order	Song	Result	
Contestant	Order	Song	Judges' score	Public vote
Phoebe Chee	1	"背对背拥抱"	Bottom nine	Bottom eleven
Lim Yong Hang	2	"第几个100天"	Bottom nine	Bottom eleven
Yeo Min	3	"爱是你眼里的一首情歌"	Bottom nine	Bottom eleven
Ng Yuan Yi	4	"明知我爱你"	Bottom nine	Bottom eleven
Leon Lee	5	"人质"	Top three	Bottom eleven
Bonnie Loo	6	"如燕"	Bottom nine	Bottom eleven
Gwendolyn Lee	7	"记念"	Bottom nine	Bottom eleven
Tan Mei Kee	8	"爱如潮水"	Bottom nine	Bottom eleven
Joseph Li	9	"同花顺"	Bottom nine	Bottom eleven
Wong Yu Ting	10	"我怀念的"	Bottom nine	Bottom eleven
Valerie Loo	11	"双栖动物"	Top three	Top
Leonard Lim	12	"担心"	Top	Bottom eleven

=== Print photo shoot details ===
- Theme: No theme

Contestants' results for print photo shoot
Contestant	Order	Result
Phoebe Chee	1	Bottom eleven
Lim Yong Hang	2	Bottom eleven
Yeo Min	3	Bottom eleven
Ng Yuan Yi	4	Bottom eleven
Leon Lee	5	Bottom eleven
Bonnie Loo	6	Bottom eleven
Gwendolyn Lee	7	Bottom eleven
Tan Mei Kee	8	Top
Joseph Li	9	Bottom eleven
Wong Yu Ting	10	Bottom eleven
Valerie Loo	11	Bottom eleven
Leonard Lim	12	Bottom eleven

=== Live television show details ===
==== Week 1 (18 February) ====
- Theme: No theme
- Musical guest: Popu Lady ("Lady First")

Contestants' performances on the first live television show
Contestant	Order	Song	Score							Result
Contestant	Order	Song	Live radio shows & print photo shoot (20%)	Judges					Total (70%)	Result
Contestant	Order	Song	Live radio shows & print photo shoot (20%)	DC	XH	JL	Total	Total (50%)	Total (70%)	Result
Phoebe Chee	1	"懒得去管"	12.4	7.5	8.6	6.0	22.1	36.83	49.23	Safe
Lim Yong Hang	2	"记得"	12.0	7.0	7.8	7.5	22.3	37.17	49.17	Safe
Yeo Min	3	"当你"	11.7	6.8	6.9	5.8	19.5	32.50	44.20	Safe
Ng Yuan Yi	4	"遇见"	11.8	6.5	6.1	5.8	18.4	30.67	42.47	Eliminated
Leon Lee	5	"就是我"	12.3	7.0	7.3	5.6	19.9	33.17	45.47	Eliminated
Bonnie Loo	6	"不够成熟"	13.7	8.5	9.2	7.8	25.5	42.50	56.20	Safe

==== Week 2 (25 February) ====
- Theme: No theme

Contestants' performances on the second live television show
Contestant	Order	Song	Score							Result
Contestant	Order	Song	Live radio shows & print photo shoot (20%)	Judges					Total (70%)	Result
Contestant	Order	Song	Live radio shows & print photo shoot (20%)	DC	XH	JL	Total	Total (50%)	Total (70%)	Result
Gwendolyn Lee	1	"泪若雨下"	12.5	8.0	7.2	6.8	22.0	36.67	49.17	Safe
Tan Mei Kee	2	"我要快乐"	13.3	6.8	7.8	5.8	20.4	34.00	47.30	Eliminated
Joseph Li	3	"忘记"	11.4	6.5	6.3	6.2	19.0	31.67	43.07	Eliminated
Wong Yu Ting	4	"冲动"	11.8	7.3	6.9	6.3	20.5	34.17	45.97	Safe
Valerie Loo	5	"我也很想他"	14.5	7.0	6.2	6.0	19.2	32.00	46.50	Safe
Leonard Lim	6	"你是我的唯一"	14.2	9.0	9.1	7.0	25.1	41.83	56.03	Safe

==== Week 3 (4 March) ====
- Theme: Their favourite local singers
- Musical guest: Ming Bridges ("Under the Stars")

Contestants' performances on the third live television show
Contestant	Order	Song	Favourite local singer	Judges' score				Result
Contestant	Order	Song	Favourite local singer	DC	XH	JL	Total	Result
Bonnie Loo	1	"雨天"	Stefanie Sun	8.0	8.9	7.5	24.4	Safe
Lim Yong Hang	2	"天黑"	A-do	8.3	7.5	6.6	22.4	Safe
Wong Yu Ting	3	"讨厌"	Rui En	7.5	7.2	6.0	20.7	Safe
Phoebe Chee	4	"难得一见"	Stefanie Sun	7.5	6.9	6.5	20.9	Safe
Yeo Min	5	"当你离开的时候"	Tanya Chua	6.8	5.7	6.2	18.7	Eliminated
Leonard Lim	6	"你是我最深爱的人"	Shaun Yong Bang	8.8	8.3	7.2	24.3	Safe
Valerie Loo	7	"说到爱"	Tanya Chua	6.0	5.7	6.0	17.7	Eliminated
Gwendolyn Lee	8	"Beautiful Love"	Tanya Chua	9.0	9.2	7.0	25.2	Safe

==== Week 4 (11 March) ====
- Theme: Judges' choice
- Musical guests: Hong Yu Yang, Renfred Ng and Geraldine See ("只对你有感觉")

Contestants' performances on the fourth live television show
Contestant	Order	Song	Chosen by	Judges' score				Result
Contestant	Order	Song	Chosen by	DC	XH	JL	Total	Result
Leonard Lim	1	"复制人"	Jim Lim	8.0	8.7	6.8	23.5	Safe
Wong Yu Ting	2	"超快感"	Dennis Chew	7.5	6.6	6.2	20.3	Eliminated
Gwendolyn Lee	3	"我怀念的"	Xiaohan	8.8	8.1	6.8	23.7	Safe
Phoebe Chee	4	"狂想曲"	Jim Lim	8.5	8.4	7.0	23.9	Safe
Lim Yong Hang	5	"她说"	Dennis Chew	8.5	7.9	7.2	23.6	Safe
Bonnie Loo	6	"炫耀"	Xiaohan	8.8	8.9	7.3	25.0	Safe

==== Week 5 (18 March) ====
- Theme: Their trump cards
- Musical guest: Da Feng Chui ("相约每天")

Contestants' performances on the fifth live television show
Contestant	Order	Song	Judges' score				Result
Contestant	Order	Song	DC	XH	JL	Total	Result
Lim Yong Hang	1	"心如刀割"	8.5	8.3	6.8	23.6	Safe
Gwendolyn Lee	2	"双栖动物"	7.3	7.4	6.6	21.3	Safe
Phoebe Chee	3	"寂寞先生"	7.5	8.1	6.5	22.1	Eliminated
Leonard Lim	4	"遗憾"	9.3	9.5	7.6	26.4	Safe
Bonnie Loo	5	"不想让你知道"	8.8	8.9	7.1	24.8	Safe

==== Week 6: Final (25/31 March) ====
25 March (Prelude)

- Group performance: "第一天" (all finalists except Yeo Min)

All top 12 finalists returned to the stage in this live non-elimination performance show. It featured group performances from the finalists as well as a look-back on their journey in the competition. Although Yeo Min, one of the top 12 finalists, was due to appear and perform, she was absent from the show as she was down with chickenpox.

Contestants' performances on the sixth live television show
Contestant	Order	Song
Leon Lee, Joseph Li, Valerie Loo & Tan Mei Kee	1	"小酒窝"
Phoebe Chee, Ng Yuan Yi & Wong Yu Ting	2	"逆光"
Gwendolyn Lee, Leonard Lim, Lim Yong Hang & Bonnie Loo	3	"一起走到"

31 March (Round 1)

- Themes: Contestant duets: designated songs; contestant duets: love songs
- Group performances: "By Now" (all finalists) and "别找我麻烦" (all finalists except Gwendolyn Lee, Leonard Lim, Lim Yong Hang and Bonnie Loo)
- Musical guest: Della Ding Dang ("有你陪")

Music producer and composer Lee Wei Song, former judge Li Feihui and singer Eric Moo were brought in as the guest judges. Guest hosting roles were also brought in during the live final. Ben Yeo was brought in as the guest host.

Contestants' performances on the seventh live television show: round one
Contestant	Order	First song (duet)^{1} / Second song (duet)	Judges' score								Result
Contestant	Order	First song (duet)^{1} / Second song (duet)	DC	XH	JL	WS	FH	EM	Total		Result
Bonnie Loo	1	"明知我爱你" (with Gwendolyn Lee)	8.5	8.8	7.0	8.0	8.5	7.5	48.3	96.8	Safe
Bonnie Loo	6	"发现爱" (with Lim Yong Hang)	8.3	9.0	7.7	7.0	7.0	9.5	48.5	96.8	Safe
Lim Yong Hang	3	"他一定很爱你" (with Leonard Lim)	8.8	9.1	7.8	8.0	7.5	7.1	48.3	90.2	Third place
Lim Yong Hang	5	"发现爱" (with Bonnie Loo)	9.1	7.5	7.2	6.0	6.0	6.1	41.9	90.2	Third place
Gwendolyn Lee	2	"明知我爱你" (with Bonnie Loo)	8.0	7.1	6.4	5.0	7.5	8.1	42.1	79.5	Safe
Gwendolyn Lee	7	"小夫妻" (with Leonard Lim)	7.0	6.7	6.6	5.0	5.0	7.1	37.4	79.5	Safe
Leonard Lim	4	"他一定很爱你" (with Lim Yong Hang)	8.2	8.0	7.0	5.0	6.5	9.1	43.8	83.7	Third place
Leonard Lim	8	"小夫妻" (with Gwendolyn Lee)	8.0	7.9	7.0	5.0	5.5	6.5	39.9	83.7	Third place

^1 All performances featured backing vocals from Singaporean vocal band MICappella.

31 March (Round 2)

- Themes: Oldies remakes; winner's song
- Musical guests: Li Feihui and Eric Moo ("等你等到我心痛" and "你是我的唯一")

Contestants' performances on the seventh live television show: round two
Contestant	Order	First song / Second song	Judges' score								Result
Contestant	Order	First song / Second song	DC	XH	JL	WS	FH	EM	Total		Result
Bonnie Loo	1	"心痛"	9.5	9.5	8.0	8.5	9.5	9.6	54.6	110.4	Winner
Bonnie Loo	3	"记得"	9.7	9.6	8.2	9.0	9.5	9.8	55.8	110.4	Winner
Gwendolyn Lee	2	"城里的月光"	7.0	6.3	5.5	3.0	4.0	5.1	30.9	66.0	Runner-up
Gwendolyn Lee	4	"True Love"	7.3	5.9	6.0	5.0	5.0	5.9	35.1	66.0	Runner-up
