= Campus SuperStar season 1 =

Campus SuperStar
- Season 1
- Hosted by: Hong Junyang; Dasmond Koh; Sugianto; Christina Lin (guest); Ng Hui (guest); Cruz Teng (guest); Ben Yeo (guest)
- Judges: Foong Wai See; Cavin Soh; Peter Tan; Li Feihui; Lee Shih Shiong (guest); Lee Wei Song (guest)
- Winner: Ng Chee Yang
- Runner-up: Teresa Tseng

Release
- Original network: MediaCorp Channel U
- Original release: 2 January – 3 April 2006

Season chronology
- Next → Season 2

Campus SuperStar is a Singaporean television music competition to find new singing talent. Contestants are students from secondary schools, junior colleges and institutes of technical education. The first season began airing on MediaCorp Channel U on 2 January, 2006 and ended on 3 April, 2006. The original lineup of judges were Foong Wai See, Cavin Soh and Peter Tan. Li Feihui was brought in as the fourth judge in the first week of semi-final. Hong Junyang, Dasmond Koh and Sugianto hosted the show.

The male category winner, Ng Chee Yang, a sixteen-year-old student from Hwa Chong Institution, was named the inaugural winner of Campus SuperStar, with female category winner Teresa Tseng from CHIJ Katong Convent named the runner-up. Ng received a two-year MediaCorp management contract and a cash prize of $2,000.

== Judges and hosts ==
The original lineup of judges for season one were Y.E.S. 93.3FM programme director Foong Wai See, actor and singer Cavin Soh as well as vocal coach Peter Tan. From the first semi-final round, singer and songwriter Li Feihui brought in as the fourth judge. MediaCorp host Dasmond Koh, as well as Project SuperStar finalists Hong Junyang and Sugianto were announced as the hosts for the show.

== Selection process ==
=== Applications and first auditions ===
The audition was opened to students studying in secondary schools, junior colleges or institutes of technical education in Singapore. Auditionees must remain as a student in Singapore throughout the entire competition, from November 2005 to April 2006. Auditions in front of the judges for season 1 took place at Toa Payoh HDB Hub. The first auditions were held on the level 3 of Junction 8 Shopping Centre from 19 to 22 November. There were approximately 4,000 students applied to take part in the auditions. At the end of the first round of auditions, successful auditionees were put through by the judges to the second round of auditions.

=== Second auditions ===
The second auditions took place at MediaCorp. The second auditions were held closed-door and there were five judges judging the contestants. At the end of the auditions, a small number of contestants were put through to the third and final round of the auditions.

=== Third auditions ===
The third and final round of auditions were held on 13 December, 2005, once again at Junction 8 Shopping Centre. At the end of the third auditions, the judges would select 10 contestants each from the male and female categories to form the final 20. The contestants who were selected as the final 20 were put through to the live shows.

== Finalists ==
Key:

– Winner
– Runner-up
– Gender/Category runner-up
– Semi-finalist
– Advanced via Wildcard

Act	Age(s)	School	Gender/Category	Result
Ng Chee Yang 黄智阳	16	Hwa Chong Institution	Male	Winner
Teresa Tseng 曾詠霖	15	CHIJ Katong Convent	Female	Runner-up
Renfred Ng 黄业伦	15	Peicai Secondary School	Male	Category Runner-up
Geraldine See 史心莹	17	ITE College West	Female	Category Runner-up
Adriano Wong 黄俊辉	17	Temasek Secondary School	Male	Category 3rd place
Clara Tan 陈慧伶	15	Dunman High School	Female	Category 3rd place
Hong Yu Yang 洪裕阳	16	Manjusri Secondary School	Male	Category 4th place
Ng Imm Khim 黄韵琴	13	East Spring Secondary School	Female	Category 4th place
Chen Yi Yuan 陈义元	15	Presbyterian High School	Male	Category 5th place
Yvonne Chua 蔡嘉航	16	Victoria Junior College	Female	Category 5th place
Choo Siew Ping 朱秀苹	15	Guangyang Secondary School	Female	Category 6th-10th place
Sheena Goh 吴佩思	17	Saint Andrew's Junior College	Female	Category 6th-10th place
Shermaine Goh 吴佩音	17	Tampines Junior College	Female	Category 6th-10th place
Ho Chee Mun 何梓文	17	Saint Andrew's Junior College	Male	Category 6th-10th place
Alejandro Hou Lu 侯卓荣	15	Bendemeer Secondary School	Male	Category 6th-10th place
Koh Bee Kwee 高美贵	16	Temasek Junior College	Female	Category 6th-10th place
Lee Yin Wei 李尹维	15	Raffles Institution	Male	Category 6th-10th place
Kenneth Lim 林沛荣	18	ITE College West	Male	Category 6th-10th place
Ng Yang Ce 黄扬策	15	Jurong Secondary School	Female	Category 6th-10th place
Samuel Tan 陈志龙	17	Nanyang Junior College	Male	Category 6th-10th place

== Live shows ==
The live shows began on 2 January. Each week, the contestants' performances took place on Monday at 8pm and the results were announced on the same night at 11.30pm. Each live show had a different theme.

The live final included performances from Nicholas Teo and Project SuperStar season one winner Kelvin Tan. Lee Shih Shiong and Lee Wei Song were brought in as guest judges during the live final as well.

=== Results summary ===
Colour key

–	Contestant did not perform
–	Contestant received the lowest judges' score
–	Contestant received the lowest combined total and was eliminated
–	Contestant received the highest judges' score or combined total

Weekly results per contestant
Contestant	Week 1		Week 2		Week 3		Week 4		Week 5		Week 6		Week 7		Week 8		Week 9		Week 10		Week 11		Week 12			
Contestant	Week 1		Week 2		Week 3		Week 4		Week 5		Week 6		Week 7		Week 8		Week 9		Week 10		Week 11		Round 1		Round 2	
Contestant	PS	RS	PS	RS	PS	RS	PS	RS	PS	RS	PS	RS	PS	RS	PS	RS	PS	RS	PS	RS	PS	RS	PS	RS	PS	RS
Ng Chee Yang	2nd^{(B)} 20.5	Safe^{(B)}	—N/a	—N/a	—N/a	—N/a	3rd^{(B)} 18.5	Safe^{(B)}	1st^{(B)} 21.5	Safe^{(B)}	—N/a	—N/a	—N/a	—N/a	—N/a	—N/a	1st^{(B)} 32.0	Safe^{(B)}	2nd^{(B)} 29.0	Safe^{(B)}	1st^{(B)} 35.5	Safe^{(B)}	1st^{(B)} 48.5	1st^{(B)} 53.7%	1st 51.0	Winner; 61.0%
Teresa Tseng	—N/a	—N/a	1st^{(G)} 22.5	Safe^{(G)}	—N/a	—N/a	1st^{(G)} 23.0	Safe^{(G)}	1st^{(G)} 22.0	Safe^{(G)}	—N/a	—N/a	—N/a	—N/a	1st^{(G)} 30.5	Safe^{(G)}	—N/a	—N/a	1st^{(G)} 29.5	Safe^{(G)}	1st^{(G)} 34.0	Safe^{(G)}	1st^{(G)} 48.5	1st^{(G)} 51.1%	2nd 45.5	Runner-up; 39.0%
Renfred Ng	4th^{(B)} 17.5	Safe^{(B)}	—N/a	—N/a	4th^{(B)} 17.0	Safe^{(B)}	—N/a	—N/a	3rd^{(B)} 18.0	Safe^{(B)}	—N/a	—N/a	—N/a	—N/a	—N/a	—N/a	5th^{(B)} 22.0	Safe^{(B)}	1st^{(B)} 30.0	Safe^{(B)}	3rd^{(B)} 26.5	Safe^{(B)}	2nd^{(B)} 41.0	2nd^{(B)} 46.3%	Eliminated (week 12)	
Geraldine See	1st^{(G)} 21.5	Safe^{(G)}	—N/a	—N/a	3rd^{(G)} 18.0	Safe^{(G)}	—N/a	—N/a	2nd^{(G)} 21.0	3rd^{(G)}	Eliminated (week 5)		1st^{(G)} 21.0	1st^{(G)}	3rd^{(G)} 27.0	Safe^{(G)}	—N/a	—N/a	4th^{(G)} 24.0	Safe^{(G)}	3rd^{(G)} 27.5	Safe^{(G)}	2nd^{(G)} 42.5	2nd^{(G)} 48.9%	Eliminated (week 12)	
Adriano Wong	—N/a	—N/a	1st^{(B)} 19.5	Safe^{(B)}	2nd^{(B)} 19.5	Safe^{(B)}	—N/a	—N/a	—N/a	—N/a	2nd^{(B)} 18.5	3rd^{(B)}	1st^{(B)} 22.0	1st^{(B)}	—N/a	—N/a	2nd^{(B)} 30.0	Safe^{(B)}	4th^{(B)} 25.0	Safe^{(B)}	2nd^{(B)} 30.0	3rd^{(B)}	Eliminated (week 11)			
Clara Tan	—N/a	—N/a	5th^{(G)} 16.5	Safe^{(G)}	—N/a	—N/a	4th^{(G)} 17.5	Safe^{(G)}	3rd^{(G)} 18.5	Safe^{(G)}	—N/a	—N/a	—N/a	—N/a	4th^{(G)} 22.5	Safe^{(G)}	—N/a	—N/a	3rd^{(G)} 26.0	Safe^{(G)}	2nd^{(G)} 29.0	3rd^{(G)}	Eliminated (week 11)			
Hong Yu Yang	—N/a	—N/a	4th^{(B)} 17.5	Safe^{(B)}	—N/a	—N/a	4th^{(B)} 17.0	Safe^{(B)}	—N/a	—N/a	3rd^{(B)} 16.5	Safe^{(B)}	—N/a	—N/a	—N/a	—N/a	3rd^{(B)} 28.0	Safe^{(B)}	3rd^{(B)} 28.0	4th^{(B)}	Eliminated (week 10)					
Ng Imm Khim	2nd^{(G)} 20.0	Safe^{(G)}	—N/a	—N/a	—N/a	—N/a	2nd^{(G)} 20.5	Safe^{(G)}	—N/a	—N/a	1st^{(G)} 21.5	Safe^{(G)}	—N/a	—N/a	2nd^{(G)} 29.5	Safe^{(G)}	—N/a	—N/a	2nd^{(G)} 29.0	4th^{(G)}	Eliminated (week 10)					
Chen Yi Yuan	1st^{(B)} 21.5	Safe^{(B)}	—N/a	—N/a	—N/a	—N/a	1st^{(B)} 21.5	Safe^{(B)}	—N/a	—N/a	1st^{(B)} 19.5	Safe^{(B)}	—N/a	—N/a	—N/a	—N/a	4th^{(B)} 25.5	5th^{(B)}	Eliminated (week 9)							
Yvonne Chua	5th^{(G)} 17.0	Safe^{(G)}	—N/a	—N/a	1st^{(G)} 20.0	Safe^{(G)}	—N/a	—N/a	—N/a	—N/a	2nd^{(G)} 19.0	Safe^{(G)}	—N/a	—N/a	5th^{(G)} 22.0	5th^{(G)}	Eliminated (week 8)									
Ng Yang Ce	—N/a	—N/a	4th^{(G)} 17.0	Safe^{(G)}	4th^{(G)} 16.5	Safe^{(G)}	—N/a	—N/a	—N/a	—N/a	3rd^{(G)} 17.0	3rd^{(G)}	4th^{(G)} 17.0	Bottom five^{(G)}	Not returned (week 7)											
Lee Yin Wei	2nd^{(B)} 20.5	Safe^{(B)}	—N/a	—N/a	1st^{(B)} 20.5	Safe^{(B)}	—N/a	—N/a	2nd^{(B)} 21.0	3rd^{(B)}	Eliminated (week 5)		3rd^{(B)} 18.0	Bottom five^{(B)}	Not returned (week 7)											
Samuel Tan	—N/a	—N/a	3rd^{(B)} 18.5	Safe^{(B)}	—N/a	—N/a	2nd^{(B)} 19.5	4th^{(B)}	Eliminated (week 4)				2nd^{(B)} 19.0	Bottom five^{(B)}	Not returned (week 7)											
Sheena Goh	—N/a	—N/a	2nd^{(G)} 17.5	Safe^{(G)}	—N/a	—N/a	3rd^{(G)} 18.0	4th^{(G)}	Eliminated (week 4)				3rd^{(G)} 18.0	Bottom five^{(G)}	Not returned (week 7)											
Kenneth Lim	—N/a	—N/a	2nd^{(B)} 19.0	Safe^{(B)}	3rd^{(B)} 18.5	4th^{(B)}	Eliminated (week 3)						4th^{(B)} 16.5	Bottom five^{(B)}	Not returned (week 7)											
Shermaine Goh	4th^{(G)} 18.0	Safe^{(G)}	—N/a	—N/a	2nd^{(G)} 18.5	4th^{(G)}	Eliminated (week 3)						6th^{(G)} 16.5	Bottom five^{(G)}	Not returned (week 7)											
Alejandro Hou Lu	—N/a	—N/a	4th^{(B)} 17.5	5th^{(B)}	Eliminated (week 2)								4th^{(B)} 16.5	Bottom five^{(B)}	Not returned (week 7)											
Koh Bee Kwee	—N/a	—N/a	2nd^{(G)} 17.5	5th^{(G)}	Eliminated (week 2)								2nd^{(G)} 18.5	Bottom five^{(G)}	Not returned (week 7)											
Ho Chee Mun	5th^{(B)} 17.0	5th^{(B)}	Eliminated (week 1)										6th^{(B)} 16.0	Bottom five^{(B)}	Not returned (week 7)											
Choo Siew Ping	3rd^{(G)} 19.0	5th^{(G)}	Eliminated (week 1)										4th^{(G)} 17.0	Bottom five^{(G)}	Not returned (week 7)											

=== Live show details ===
==== Week 1: Quarter-final 1 (2 January) ====
- Theme: No theme

Contestants' performances on the first live show
Contestant	Order	Song	Judges' score				Result
Contestant	Order	Song	CS	PT	WS	Total	Result
Female category
Ng Imm Khim	1	"爱的主打歌"	6.5	6.0	7.0	19.5	Safe
Shermaine Goh	2	"幸福的地图"	6.0	5.5	6.5	18.0	Safe
Choo Siew Ping	3	"宁夏"	6.0	6.5	6.5	19.0	Eliminated
Yvonne Chua	4	"Fly Away"	5.5	5.5	6.0	17.0	Safe
Geraldine See	5	"解脱"	7.0	7.0	7.5	21.5	Safe
Male category
Ng Chee Yang	1	"普通朋友"	6.5	6.5	7.5	20.5	Safe
Chen Yi Yuan	2	"莎士比亚的天分"	7.0	7.0	7.5	21.5	Safe
Ho Chee Mun	3	"安静"	5.5	5.0	6.5	17.0	Eliminated
Lee Yin Wei	4	"简单爱"	7.0	7.0	6.5	20.5	Safe
Renfred Ng	5	"爱上未来的你"	5.5	6.0	6.0	17.5	Safe

==== Week 2: Quarter-final 2 (9 January) ====
- Theme: No theme

Contestants' performances on the second live show
Contestant	Order	Song	Judges' score				Result
Contestant	Order	Song	CS	PT	WS	Total	Result
Female category
Sheena Goh	1	"理想情人"	6.0	5.5	6.0	17.5	Safe
Koh Bee Kwee	2	"燕尾蝶"	6.0	5.5	6.0	17.5	Eliminated
Clara Tan	3	"最熟悉的陌生人"	5.5	4.5	6.5	16.5	Safe
Teresa Tseng	4	"灰姑娘"	7.0	7.5	8.0	22.5	Safe
Ng Yang Ce	5	"Cappuccino"	6.0	5.0	6.0	17.0	Safe
Male category
Kenneth Lim	1	"我还能爱谁"	6.5	6.0	6.5	19.0	Safe
Samuel Tan	2	"Piano"	6.0	6.5	6.0	18.5	Safe
Adriano Wong	3	"爱你等于爱自己"	7.0	6.0	6.5	19.5	Safe
Hong Yu Yang	4	"爱的就是你"	5.5	5.5	6.5	17.5	Safe
Alejandro Hou Lu	5	"找自己"	5.0	6.5	6.0	17.5	Eliminated

==== Week 3: Quarter-final 3 (16 January) ====
- Theme: No theme

Contestants' performances on the third live show
Contestant	Order	Song	Judges' score				Result
Contestant	Order	Song	CS	PT	WS	Total	Result
Female category
Geraldine See	1	"真实"	5.5	5.5	7.0	18.0	Safe
Shermaine Goh	2	"你的微笑"	6.0	6.0	6.5	18.5	Eliminated
Ng Yang Ce	3	"依然是朋友"	5.5	4.5	6.5	16.5	Safe
Yvonne Chua	4	"再一次拥有"	7.0	6.5	6.5	20.0	Safe
Male category
Lee Yin Wei	1	"借口"	6.0	7.0	7.5	20.5	Safe
Kenneth Lim	2	"你是我最深爱的人"	5.5	6.0	7.0	18.5	Eliminated
Renfred Ng	3	"花香"	5.0	6.0	6.0	17.0	Safe
Adriano Wong	4	"凌晨三点钟"	7.0	6.0	6.5	19.5	Safe

==== Week 4: Quarter-final 4 (23 January) ====
- Theme: No theme

Contestants' performances on the fourth live show
Contestant	Order	Song	Judges' score				Result
Contestant	Order	Song	CS	PT	WS	Total	Result
Female category
Clara Tan	1	"海滩"	6.0	5.0	6.5	17.5	Safe
Ng Imm Khim	2	"心动"	7.0	6.5	7.0	20.5	Safe
Sheena Goh	3	"Don't Stop"	5.5	6.0	6.5	18.0	Eliminated
Teresa Tseng	4	"路"	8.0	7.5	7.5	23.0	Safe
Male category
Samuel Tan	1	"翅膀"	6.0	6.5	7.0	19.5	Eliminated
Hong Yu Yang	2	"爱我还是他"	5.5	5.0	6.5	17.0	Safe
Chen Yi Yuan	3	"除此之外"	7.0	7.0	7.5	21.5	Safe
Ng Chee Yang	4	"Forever Love"	6.0	6.0	6.5	18.5	Safe

==== Week 5: Quarter-final 5 (6 February) ====
- Theme: No theme
- Group performances: "不想长大" (performed by Geraldine See, Clara Tan and Teresa Tseng) and "爱的初体验" (performed by Lee Yin Wei, Ng Chee Yang and Renfred Ng)

Contestants' performances on the fifth live show
Contestant	Order	Song	Judges' score				Result
Contestant	Order	Song	CS	PT	WS	Total	Result
Female category
Teresa Tseng	1	"暧昧"	7.5	7.5	7.0	22.0	Safe
Clara Tan	2	"原来你什么都不要"	6.0	6.0	6.5	18.5	Safe
Geraldine See	3	"舍得"	7.0	7.0	7.0	21.0	Eliminated
Male category
Lee Yin Wei	1	"男人.海洋"	6.5	7.5	7.0	21.0	Eliminated
Renfred Ng	2	"星晴"	6.0	6.0	6.0	18.0	Safe
Ng Chee Yang	3	"二十二"	7.5	7.0	7.0	21.5	Safe

==== Week 6: Quarter-final 6 (13 February) ====
- Theme: No theme
- Group performances: "野蛮游戏" (performed by Yvonne Chua, Ng Imm Khim and Ng Yang Ce) and "C'est Si Bon" (performed by Chen Yi Yuan, Hong Yu Yang and Adriano Wong)

Contestants' performances on the sixth live show
Contestant	Order	Song	Judges' score				Result
Contestant	Order	Song	CS	PT	WS	Total	Result
Female category
Ng Yang Ce	1	"Yes I Love You"	5.5	5.0	6.5	17.0	Eliminated
Yvonne Chua	2	"幸德瑞拉"	7.5	5.5	6.0	19.0	Safe
Ng Imm Khim	3	"他和她的故事"	7.5	7.0	7.0	21.5	Safe
Male category
Chen Yi Yuan	1	"幸福车站"	6.5	6.0	7.0	19.5	Safe
Adriano Wong	2	"你不在"	6.5	6.0	6.0	18.5	Eliminated
Hong Yu Yang	3	"很想你"	5.5	5.0	6.0	16.5	Safe

==== Week 7: Wildcard round (20 February) ====
- Theme: No theme
- Group performances: "天灰" (performed by Choo Siew Ping, Sheena Goh, Shermaine Goh, Koh Bee Kwee, Ng Yang Ce and Geraldine See) and "眼泪的味道" (performed by Ho Chee Mun, Alejandro Hou Lu, Adriano Wong, Lee Yin Wei, Kenneth Lim and Samuel Tan)

The first twelve contestants who were eliminated from the first six live shows returned to the stage to perform for the Wildcard round. The contestant who received the highest combined score from either the male and female categories would be reinstated from the competition.

Contestants' performances on the seventh live show
Contestant	Order	Song	Judges' score				Result
Contestant	Order	Song	CS	PT	WS	Total	Result
Female category
Choo Siew Ping	1	"挥着翅膀的女孩"	6.0	5.5	5.5	17.0	Not revived
Koh Bee Kwee	2	"丝路"	7.0	6.5	5.0	18.5	Not revived
Shermaine Goh	3	"你快乐吗"	5.5	5.0	6.0	16.5	Not revived
Sheena Goh	4	"不想让你知道"	6.0	5.5	6.5	18.0	Not revived
Geraldine See	5	"High High High"	7.0	7.0	7.0	21.0	Revived
Ng Yang Ce	6	"当你"	6.0	5.0	6.0	17.0	Not revived
Male category
Ho Chee Mun	1	"手放开"	5.0	5.5	5.5	16.0	Not revived
Alejandro Hou Lu	2	"爱很简单"	5.0	6.0	5.5	16.5	Not revived
Kenneth Lim	3	"疯狂世界"	6.0	5.5	5.0	16.5	Not revived
Samuel Tan	4	"恋爱ING"	6.5	6.5	6.0	19.0	Not revived
Lee Yin Wei	5	"孙悟空"	6.0	6.5	5.5	18.0	Not revived
Adriano Wong	6	"嫁给我"	7.5	8.0	6.5	22.0	Revived

==== Week 8: Semi-final 1 (27 February) ====
- Theme: No theme

Contestants' performances on the eighth live show
Contestant	Order	Song	Judges' score					Result
Contestant	Order	Song	WS	CS	PT	FH	Total	Result
Female category
Clara Tan	1	"因为你"	5.5	6.0	5.5	5.5	22.5	Safe
Ng Imm Khim	2	"遗失的美好"	7.0	7.5	7.5	7.5	29.5	Safe
Geraldine See	3	"白色羽毛"	7.5	7.0	6.5	6.0	27.0	Safe
Yvonne Chua	4	"本来"	6.5	5.5	5.0	5.0	22.0	Eliminated
Teresa Tseng	5	"Love Love Love"	7.5	8.0	8.0	7.0	30.5	Safe

==== Week 9: Semi-final 2 (6 March) ====
- Theme: No theme

Contestants' performances on the ninth live show
Contestant	Order	Song	Judges' score					Result
Contestant	Order	Song	WS	CS	PT	FH	Total	Result
Male category
Chen Yi Yuan	1	"I Believe"	6.5	6.0	6.0	7.0	25.5	Eliminated
Hong Yu Yang	2	"枫"	7.5	7.0	6.5	7.0	28.0	Safe
Adriano Wong	3	"My Anata"	7.0	7.5	7.5	8.0	30.0	Safe
Renfred Ng	4	"Kiss Me 123"	6.0	5.0	5.5	5.5	22.0	Safe
Ng Chee Yang	5	"月亮代表谁的心"	7.0	8.0	8.5	8.5	32.0	Safe

==== Week 10: Semi-final 3 (13 March) ====
- Theme: Uptempo dance music

Contestants' performances on the tenth live show
Contestant	Order	Song	Judges' score					Result
Contestant	Order	Song	WS	CS	PT	FH	Total	Result
Female category
Ng Imm Khim	1	"看我72变"	6.5	7.5	7.5	7.5	29.0	Eliminated
Teresa Tseng	2	"孤单芭蕾"	7.5	7.5	7.5	7.0	29.5	Safe
Clara Tan	3	"见习爱神"	6.5	6.5	6.5	6.5	26.0	Safe
Geraldine See	4	"给我感觉"	6.0	6.0	6.0	6.0	24.0	Safe
Male category
Ng Chee Yang	1	"天与地"	7.0	7.0	8.0	7.0	29.0	Safe
Renfred Ng	2	"大舌头"	7.5	7.5	7.0	8.0	30.0	Safe
Hong Yu Yang	3	"呛司呛司"	7.0	7.0	7.0	7.0	28.0	Eliminated
Adriano Wong	4	"自由"	6.5	6.5	6.0	6.0	25.0	Safe

==== Week 11: Semi-final 4 (20 March) ====
- Theme: No theme

Contestants' performances on the eleventh live show
Contestant	Order	Song	Judges' score					Result
Contestant	Order	Song	WS	CS	PT	FH	Total	Result
Female category
Geraldine See	1	"祝我生日快乐"	7.5	6.0	7.0	7.0	27.5	Safe
Clara Tan	2	"至少走得比你早"	7.0	7.0	7.5	7.5	29.0	Eliminated
Teresa Tseng	3	"Fly Away"	8.5	8.5	8.5	8.5	34.0	Safe
Male category
Adriano Wong	4	"Julia"	7.5	7.5	7.5	7.5	30.0	Eliminated
Renfred Ng	5	"那女孩对我说"	6.5	7.0	7.0	6.0	26.5	Safe
Ng Chee Yang	6	"就是爱你"	9.0	8.5	9.0	9.0	35.5	Safe

==== Week 12: Final (27 March/2/3 April) ====
27 March (Prelude)

- Group performance: "Hu-La-Hu" (all finalists)

All top 20 finalists returned to the stage in this pre-recorded non-elimination performance show. It featured group performances from the finalists as well as a look-back on their journey in the competition.

Contestants' performances on the twelfth pre-recorded show
Contestant	Order	Song
Yvonne Chua, Ng Imm Khim & Geraldine See	1	"睁一只眼闭一只眼"
Hong Yu Yang & Renfred Ng	2	"我们都会错"
Clara Tan & Teresa Tseng	3	"遇见"
Chen Yi Yuan, Adriano Wong & Ng Chee Yang	4	"小镇姑娘"

2 April (Round 1)

- Themes: Designated song; "songs to win the competition"
- Group performance: "By Now" (all finalists)
- Musical guest: Nicholas Teo ("寂寞边界" and "只因为你")

Music producer and composer Lee Shih Shiong and Lee Wei Song were brought in as the guest judges. Guest hosting roles were also brought in during the live final. It featured Christina Lin reporting from Renfred Ng's school, Peicai Secondary School; Ng Hui from Ng Chee Yang's school, Hwa Chong Institution; Cruz Teng from Geraldine See's school, ITE College West; and Ben Yeo from Teresa Tseng's school, CHIJ Katong Convent.

Contestants' performances on the thirteenth live show: round one
Contestant	Order	First song	Order	Second song	Judges' score							Result
Contestant	Order	First song	Order	Second song	FH	CS	WS	PT	SS	WS	Total	Result
Female category
Geraldine See	1	"记得"	3	"会有那么一天"	7.5	7.5	7.5	7.0	7.0	6.0	42.5	Runner-up
Teresa Tseng	2	"记得"	4	"想念你的歌" (with CHIJ Katong Convent choir)	8.5	8.5	8.5	8.5	8.0	6.5	48.5	Winner
Male category
Ng Chee Yang	1	"Kiss Goodbye"	3	"Superwoman"	8.0	9.5	9.0	8.5	7.0	6.5	48.5	Winner
Renfred Ng	2	"Kiss Goodbye"	4	"我的麦克风"	7.5	7.0	7.0	7.5	7.0	5.0	41.0	Runner-up

2 April (Round 2)

- Themes: Alumni duets; winner's song
- Group performance: "第一天" / "招牌动作" / "绿光" / "Easy Come Easy Go" / "DA DA DA" / "终结孤单" (all finalists except Ng Chee Yang, Renfred Ng, Geraldine See and Teresa Tseng)
- Musical guest: Kelvin Tan ("约定" and "触摸")

Contestants' performances on the thirteenth live show: round two
Contestant	Order	First song (duet)	Order	Second song	Judges' score							Result
Contestant	Order	First song (duet)	Order	Second song	FH	CS	WS	PT	SS	WS	Total	Result
Teresa Tseng	1	"恋爱频率" (with Hong Junyang)	3	"有一天我会"	7.5	7.0	8.0	8.5	7.0	7.5	45.5	Runner-up
Ng Chee Yang	2	"恋爱达人" (with Shi Xin Hui)	4	"一首简单的歌"	9.0	8.0	9.0	9.0	8.0	8.0	51.0	Winner

3 April (After-party)

- Group performance: "浪花一朵朵" (all finalists)

All top 20 finalists returned to the stage once again in this live performance show to celebrate the success of the season and the crowning of the winner.

Contestants' performances on the fourteenth live show
Contestant	Order	Song
Ng Chee Yang	1	"一首简单的歌"
Chen Yi Yuan & Ng Imm Khim	2	"被风吹过的夏天"
Adriano Wong & Koh Bee Kwee	3	"制造浪漫"
Choo Siew Ping, Sheena Goh, Shermaine Goh, Koh Bee Kwee & Ng Yang Ce	4	"星光"
Teresa Tseng	5	"灰姑娘"
Yvonne Chua & Hong Yu Yang	6	"煎熬"
Ho Chee Mun, Alejandro Hou Lu, Lee Yin Wei, Kenneth Lim & Samuel Tan	7	"她的睫毛"
