= Loyang View Secondary School =

Government secondary school in Singapore

Location
- 12 Pasir Ris Street 11; Singapore
- Coordinates: 1.36702°N 103.95683°E

Information
- Type: Government secondary school
- Motto: Happy and Caring School
- Established: 1989; 37 years ago
- Session: Single session
- School code: 3077
- Principal: Eugene Lin Yucheng
- Enrolment: 1000+
- Language: English, Mandarin, Malay, Tamil
- Campus type: Urban
- Colour: Turquoise Grey Blue
- Uniform: Turquoise Top (both gender), short/long Grey pants (male), Grey skirt (Female)
- Website: www.loyangviewsec.moe.edu.sg

Loyang View Secondary School (LVSS / LVS) is a co-educational government secondary school located in Pasir Ris, Singapore. It was formed by the merger of Loyang Secondary School and Greenview Secondary School in 2018.

== History ==
=== Loyang Secondary School (1989–2018) ===
Loyang Secondary School was founded in 1989. The school began operations with 14 teachers and 390 pupils in four Express and six Normal (Academic) classes. Initially housed in East View Secondary School in Tampines, the school moved to its present premises in Pasir Ris Street 11 in 1990. The school was officially declared open on 11 April 1992 by Senior Minister of State for Education Tay Eng Soon.

In 2004, the school underwent upgrading via the Programme for Rebuilding and Improving Existing Schools.

=== Greenview Secondary School (1994–2018) ===
Greenview Secondary School was founded in 1994. In March 2016, the Ministry of Education announced that Greenview was one of the 11 schools that would be merged due to a lower intake of students. The school was closed down in 2018 and merged with Loyang Secondary School.

In 2002, Greenview was featured in a Radio Television Hong Kong documentary about home-school-community collaborations. Despite its academically-average student intake, the school did well on the national level, winning the Sustained Achievement Award (out of 12 schools nationwide) as well as two Achievement Awards in the Ministry of Education's annual Masterplan of Awards in 2005. It took the Sustained Achievement Award for the first time in 2004.

== Notable alumni ==
- Shawn Tok, singer
- Faris Ramli, national footballer
