= Stella Seah =

Singaporean singer-songwriter

- Born: Seah Hui Xian; 28 October 1992 (age 34); Singapore
- Years active: 2012–present

Chinese name
- Traditional Chinese: 謝慧嫻
- Simplified Chinese: 谢慧娴
Transcriptions
Standard Mandarin
- Hanyu Pinyin: Xiè Huìxián
- Musical career
- Origin: Singapore
- Genre: Mandarin pop
- Instrument: Vocals
- Label: Ocean Butterflies Music
- Website: www.facebook.com/HuiXianSeah

Stella Seah (born Seah Hui Xian; 28 October 1992) is a Singaporean singer-songwriter. She is signed to Ocean Butterflies. She was discovered after winning Starhub's first reality singing contest, Academy Fantasia in 2012. She was also a semi-finalist on Campus Superstar in 2007. In admiration of her perseverance to pursue a career as a singer, an anonymous sponsor had also provided her with funding for her final year of studies in LASALLE's Diploma in Music programme. Seah is also a member of singing-songwriting duo StellaVee.

== Biography ==
=== 2007–2013: Early beginnings and Sunsilk Academy Fantasia ===
In 2007, Stella represented CHIJ Katong Convent in the second season of Campus SuperStar under the name "Seah Hui Xian", in which she came in third in the female category. Later, she studied at LASALLE's School of Contemporary Music. She had been commended by Head of the School – Mr Timothy O'Dwyer as "a stand-out vocalists with a bright future." Mr O'Dwyer also said that while Stella is a seemingly shy girl off-stage, she has continuously brought strong performances to LASALLE's practice stage over the past academic years.

In 2012, Stella took part in StarHub TV's Sunsilk Academy Fantasia, a Singaporean version of Thai singing contest Academy Fantasia, in which she emerged winner. Stella has also participated in Singapore's National Day Parade 2013 as part of a premier girl band, Ricochet, at the Sing-A-Nation contest, and sung its theme song, "One Singapore".

In 2013, Stella recorded 愛不要遺憾 together with another Ocean Butterflies' singer, Melvin Sia, which is the theme song of a Singaporean telemovie, "Love Shake" (心動), which starred Fann Wong, Zheng Geping among other local stars.

=== 2014: Wings of Dreams EP ===
On 10 October 2014, Stella released her debut extended play, entitled 梦想的翅膀 (Wings of Dreams). The first single from the EP, 够 Local (Go Local), is about the daily activities and things unique to Singapore. The music video was uploaded on 28 October 2014. The second single, 我们这一班2014 (Our Class), is a remake of Dawn Gan's song of the same name, but with updated lyrics.

On 18 October, Stella was appointed to perform at the A-Nation Concert, alongside international acts like Aaron Yan and Ayumi Hamasaki. Stella was the only Singapore artiste who performed at the concert.

On 8 December 2014, Stella uploaded the music video of an original composition she wrote in 2013, 毕业之歌 (Graduation Song), for her friends in LASALLE.

=== 2015–2017: Chinese musicals, StellaVee, Sing! China ===
Stella has been cast as the second female lead for the third run of Singapore's first Chinese Musical "December Rains" (雨季). In this musical that will be running from 28 August to 6 September, Stella will be acting as "Meng Yu" (梦雨), the daughter of first female lead "Li Qing" (丽卿).

In 2015, Seah also took part in TVB's International Chinese New Talent Singing Championship, but failed to get into the top 3.

In 2016, she starred in Toy Factory Production's musical Innamorati Two, a sequel to Innamorati: The Musical, featuring original songs written by the cast.

In 2017, she teamed up with fellow Singaporean singer-songwriter Vee (易薇倪) to form the duo StellaVee. They would be releasing an EP with original songs in September 2017. Seah also participated in the second season of Sing! China as a contestant, and was selected to be part of Na Ying's team.

== Discography ==
=== Extended plays ===
- Wings of Dreams 梦想的翅膀 (2014)

=== Singles ===
Year	Title	Album	Label
2014	Go Local 够Local	Wings of Dreams 梦想的翅膀	Ocean Butterflies Music
2014	Our Class 我们这一班2014	Wings of Dreams 梦想的翅膀	Ocean Butterflies Music

=== Soundtrack appearances ===
Year	Title	Album	Label
2014	天使的翅膀	Theme Song of The Caregivers	Ocean Butterflies International
2015	心与心 (with Jacky Chew 周玮贤)	Theme song of Good Luck	Ocean Butterflies Music

== Theater ==
Year	Title	Role
2015	December Rains	Meng Yu 梦雨
2016	Innamorati Two 唯二	An An 安安
