= Cheeyang Ng =

Cheeyang Ng 黄智阳
- Also known as: Zhiyang
- Born: Ng Chee Yang
- Origin: Singapore
- Genres: Mandopop, musical theater
- Occupations: Singer-songwriter, actor, dancer, performer, pianist
- Instruments: Voice, piano
- Years active: 2006-present
- Website: Cheeyang Ng

Cheeyang Ng (simplified Chinese: 黄智阳; traditional Chinese: 黃智陽), also known as Zhiyang, is a Singaporean singer-songwriter currently based in New York City. Ng had performed around the world, including Lincoln Center with Carole King and Carnegie Hall with a cappella group Vocalosity. They got their start from winning the first season of Campus SuperStar in Singapore, going on to represent Singapore in Taiwan CTV's One Million Star. They are a graduate of Berklee College of Music and New York University Tisch School of the Arts Graduate Musical Theatre Writing.

== Music career ==
In 2005, Ng participated in the F.I.R singing competition organised by KBox. Out of the three finalists, they were the only male competitor. With F.I.R's 無限, a single in their 2nd album, Unlimited, They won the competition and managed to perform on stage together with F.I.R at IMM Shopping Mall.

In 2006, Ng represented Hwa Chong Institution, winning the overall champion title of Season 1 Campus SuperStar, a nationwide singing competition conducted by Mediacorp.

After winning the competition, they were involved in numerous performances, including the Singapore Youth Festival Opening and Closing Ceremony in 2006, where they performed the Theme Song 'Reaching Beyond'; the International Physics Olympiad 2006 Closing Ceremony; and also participated in a Mediacorp Drama Series, Let It Shine (Chinese: 萤火虫的梦) screened in January 2007.

In 2009, Ng represented Singapore in One Million Star Season 5 talent competition in Taiwan as a wildcard competitor. In 2010, They also performed as a featured vocalist in the Inaugural 2010 Summer Youth Olympic Games held in Singapore.

They also vied for a role in Glee by taking part in Season 2 of The Glee Project in the United States.

They are the founder of Singapore's a cappella group The Apex Project.

Ng performed songs from 2 original musicals in 2022. Eastbound, one of the musicals, follows Calvin, a "Chinese-American adoptee [...] reuniting with distant relatives in China under intense circumstances: Calvin needs a bone morrow transplant." The other, MĀYĀ, was about the titular Maya Mehta her experience with the Salt March.

2023 Musical Theatre Factory Makers Cohort III of the MTF Makers program.

In 2026, Ng began performing a solo interactive musical titled Legendary, themed around mythmaking, transgender identity, and Asian-American culture. The opening song, "In the Beginning" is a retelling of Chinese creation myths, mainly centered around Pangu and Nüwa. Legendary also features songs such as "The Ocean," "Descendant of the Dragon," "An Impossible Feat," and "The Goddess of Mercy."

== Personal life ==
Ng is non-binary, and uses they/them pronouns.

| Preceded by N/A | Winner of Campus SuperStar; 2006 | Succeeded by Shawn Tok |
