= Hong Junyang =

Singaporean singer (born 1981)

- Born: Ang Jun Yang; 17 August 1981 (age 44); Singapore
- Education: Saint Andrew's Junior College
- Alma mater: National University of Singapore
- Occupations: Singer; songwriter; record producer; businessman; host; actor
- Years active: 2006–present
- Spouse: Candyce Toh (m. 2009)
- Children: 2
- Musical career
- Genres: Mandarin pop
- Labels: Universal Music (2006–2007); Ocean Butterflies (2007–2010s); Cross Ratio Entertainment (present); AGNT (present)

Chinese name
- Traditional Chinese: 洪俊揚
- Simplified Chinese: 洪俊扬
- Hanyu Pinyin: Hóng Jùnyáng

Hong Junyang (born Ang Junyang; 17 August 1981) is a Singaporean singer, songwriter, record producer and businessman.

== Education ==
Hong studied at Saint Andrew's Junior College and National University of Singapore.

== Career ==
=== Singing career ===
Hong was a contestant on Project SuperStar 2005, organized by MediaCorp, and was runner-up of the male category in the finals. After the competition, he signed a recording contract with Universal Music. He has also hosted television programmes such as SuperFunkies and Campus SuperStar.

His debut album Du Jiao Shou (独角兽) was released on 26 May 2006.

At one point, Hong relocated to Taipei, Taiwan to pursue his career as a freelance music producer and songwriter.

As of September 2023, Hong is managed by Cross Ratio Entertainment and AGNT.

=== Business ventures ===
In 2018, Hong started The Original Boat Noodle, a Thai street food restaurant with two other partners. As of April 2021, it was expanded to four restaurants.

In 2020, Hong opened a branch of Taiwanese bubble tea outlet Machi Machi in Singapore. It was reportedly closed in 2025.

In 2021, Hong started an Indian banana leaf rice restaurant Bananabro, an Indian franchise from Malaysia, in Changi. It was shut down in 2022.

He also owns the café-cloud kitchen Caf (short for "Clickafood") and is an investor of bubble tea outlet Machi Machi.

In July 2023, Hong opened a Korean food stall named Oppa Kitchen at the coffeeshop co-owned by Chew Chor Meng, Dennis Chew and Maureen Ow (Miss Tam Chiak). It was closed in 2024.

In 26 September 2025, Hong announced that it had filed for bankruptcy after his Thai restaurant chain The Original Boat Noodle failed.

== Personal life ==
Hong and Candyce Toh met on Project SuperStar in 2005 and married in 2009. Their first daughter, Azalea, was born in April 2016. On 12 August 2022, they had another daughter, named Alessia.

Hong and his family reside in the northeastern part of Singapore.

He is a Christian.

== Discography ==
=== Studio albums ===
- Du Jiao Shou (2006)

=== Singles ===
- "Buddha Smiles" (2007)
- "Authenticity" (2019)
- "Hear Me Sing 2021" (2019)
- "Eternal Night" (2021)
- "Light Of My Life" (2021)
- "My Words to You" (2022)
- "Moving Forward" (2023)
