= East Spring Secondary School =

- 东源中学; Sekolah Menengah East Spring

Location
- 30 Tampines Street 34; 529231; Singapore

Information
- Type: Government
- Motto: Towards Excellence and Success Aim High Act Now
- Established: January 1999; 27 years ago
- Session: Single
- School code: 3609
- Principal: Susie Ho
- Enrolment: 1,000+
- Colour: Maroon Brown
- Song: Champions, we are!
- Nickname: East Springians

East Spring Secondary School (ESSS) is a co-educational government secondary school located in Tampines, Singapore.

== History ==
=== East Spring Secondary School ===
East Spring Secondary School was founded in January 1999.

Due to reduced demand and falling enrolment rate, the Ministry of Education (MOE) announced on 20 April 2017 that East Spring Secondary would be merged with East View Secondary School by 2019. The merged school will be located at the current site of East Spring Secondary School.

On 29 December that year, MOE announced that the merged school name will remain as East Spring Secondary School, which is the host school for both merging schools.

=== East View Secondary School ===
East View Secondary School was established on 2 January 1987 at Tampines Secondary School, occupying 14 classrooms in the afternoon session. The school started with ten Secondary One Classes (4 Express stream and 6 Normal stream classes), which were run by thirteen teachers and four non-teaching staff. After a six-month stay at Tampines Secondary School, the school shifted to its new premises at 3 Tampines Street 42 in June that year.

On 24 March 1990, the school was officially opened by Tay Eng Soon, Senior Minister of State for Education, and Member of Parliament for Eunos GRC. To commemorate the occasion, the school donated S$1,000 to the Community Chest of Singapore and S$1,000 to the National Kidney Foundation. The school has also contributed to many public events.

== Principals ==
Years	Principal
1999–2003	Yong Kwei Leong
2004–2009	Sng Teck Hui
2010–2014	Jalil-Ong Suat Eng
2015–2018	Teoh Teik Ho
2019–present	Susie Ho
