= Yuan Shuai (actor) =

Chinese actor and host (born 1981)

- Born: 1981; China
- Occupation(s): Actor, host
- Years active: 2008-2014

Chinese name
- Traditional Chinese: 袁帥
- Simplified Chinese: 袁帅
Transcriptions
Standard Mandarin
- Hanyu Pinyin: Yuán Shuài

Yuan Shuai (Chinese: 袁帅; pinyin: Yuán Shuài) is a Chinese actor and host who was formerly based in Singapore.

== Career ==
Yuan came to prominence after winning MediaCorp's U Are the One in 2008, a talent search for Channel U's Fresh Face of the Year. He signed with MediaCorp as a full-time artist and was given his first hosting roles. He also began acting minor roles in various TV dramas before landing roles in major productions such as Rescue 995 and Unriddle 2.

He graduated with a diploma in theatre studies from Nanyang Academy of Fine Arts.

== Hiatus ==
In March 2014, Yuan Shuai spoke of his family's situation in China and shared that his father was still recuperating from a bone marrow surgery he underwent in 2013. There were talks of the actor leaving showbiz to take over his family business then, but the rumours were proved baseless when Yuan Shuai clarified desire to continue acting.

In the latest turn of events, Yuan Shuai has confirmed that he will not be renewing his contract with MediaCorp when it expires end October this year, as his father is critically ill and suffering from blood cancer.

In a phone interview with the actor this afternoon, he shared that his dad's ailing condition was kept a secret from him as he was busy filming Mind Games in Kuala Lumpur, Malaysia. “They didn’t inform me of his medical condition as they didn’t want me to worry over it.”

He was finally told the news when filming wrapped and when his dad had to receive emergency treatment due to a deterioration of his medical condition.

“I gave this some thought. I left home 14 years ago [to come to Singapore] and haven’t spent much time with him. He really needs me in this critical period of time,” said Yuan Shuai. “My dad was really happy when I told him I was coming back home.”

“It’s time to fulfill my duties as a son and I want to spend more time with him,” he added. “I feel guilty because I didn’t get the chance to spend time with him as I was away from home for a long period of time, taking only short breaks to visit home in-between work.”

This will not be a permanent farewell to showbiz, however, says Yuan Shuai, who hopes to take on ad-hoc TV projects when time allows. “I’m too used to my current lifestyle in Singapore, I’ll still comeback,” said the Singapore PR (Permanent Resident).

A statement released by the MediaCorp management this afternoon read: “Yuan Shuai left China for Singapore 14 years ago, he will want to go back to his family at this trying time to spend as much quality time with his father as possible. He will not be taking up any jobs at this moment, until he finds the situation fit for him to do so in due. Yuan Shuai will be flying back to China after he settles his tenancy matters in Singapore.”

Especially grateful towards the care and support received from his MediaCorp colleagues, Yuan Shuai said, “I want to thank the artiste management unit, directors and producers for giving me a chance, Zhang Zhen Huan, Lee Teng, Pornsak, Rebecca Lim and my friends for their constant care. They are like family to me.”

When asked if acting would have to take a backseat because of the family business, Yuan Shuai replied that it is currently under his uncle's supervision.

== Filmography ==
=== Television ===
Year	Work	Role
2009	The Dream Catchers 未来不是梦	
2009	Together 当我们同在一起	Ou Yuming
2010	New Beginnings 红白囍事	Fan Yong 范勇
2010	No Limits 泳闯琴关	Yang Leiming "Thunder" 杨雷鸣
2011	Prosperity 喜事年年	Tim
2011	Bountiful Blessings 万福楼	Roy
2012	Rescue 995 995	Xu Wensong 许文嵩
2012	Unriddle 2 最火搭档2	Dai Baolun 戴保伦
2012	Poetic Justice 微笑正义	Lin Zhonglun 林仲伦
2012	Beyond X元素	Ye Rongguang 叶荣光
2013	Sudden 骤变	Lin Shenghua 林升华
2014	The Caregivers Missy 先生	Sun Shaowei 孙绍伟
2014	Against The Tide 逆潮	Zheng Tianrui 郑天瑞
2015	Mind Game 心迷	Jason

=== Movies ===
Year	Work	Role
2013	Re:solve 决义案	Yan Yong Cheng

=== Variety/Info-Ed Shows ===
Year	Show
2008	Go Green 绿设兵团
2009	Campus SuperStar 3 校园 SuperStar 3
2009	On the Beat 4 都是大发现4
2009	Loose to Win 敢瘦健康
2010	U're the Man 花样型男
2010	On the Beat 5 都是大发现5
2012	Channel 8 30th Anniversary Roadshow 戏剧30年
