= Shawn Tok =

Singaporean singer (born 1994)

Shawn Tok 卓轩正

Background information
- Born: Shawn Tok 卓轩正; 8 January 1994 (age 32)
- Origin: Singapore
- Genres: Pop Music
- Years active: 2007–present
- Website: shawntok.com

Shawn Tok (Chinese: 卓轩正; born 8 January 1994) is a Singaporean singer. He is the overall champion of the 2007 Campus SuperStar singing competition. In 2007, Shawn, then a Secondary 1 student, was crowned the overall champion of the second season of Campus SuperStar 《校园SuperStar》. Following his win, Shawn starred in multiple television dramas, films, variety shows, and advertisements. He also released multiple music projects such as his debut album 'Travel With Time' 《和时间一起旅行》 and his English EP 'Chapter 22' in 2016. He was also nominated for 'Most Popular New Comer’ at the 17th Singapore Hit Award《第17届新加坡金曲奖》.

After graduating from the University of Queensland in 2018, Tok started his passion for TV production with HBO Asia.

== Career ==
=== Campus Superstar 2007 ===
In 2007, Tok, then a Secondary 1 student, was crowned the overall champion of the second season of Campus SuperStar 《校园SuperStar》, a spin-off from Project SuperStar 《绝对 SuperStar》.

Ok was well received by the judges and received good scores from the judges in most rounds of the competition. However, he was eliminated in the second quarter-final. Tok returned to the competition after participating in the revival round. All 3 judges had high hopes for him.

Tok and Keely Wee emerged as the winners of their respective male and female categories. Tok became the 2nd Campus SuperStar Champion when he triumphed over Wee with a higher overall score at 58%.

=== 2007–2014 ===
Immediately following his win, Tok was selected to front the latest TV campaign for MediaCorp. He also caught the eyes of local producer and made his acting debut in a telemovie God of Fortune 《天降运财》 which was released in early 2008.

Tok released his debut album in June 2011 titled "Travel With Time 和时间一起旅行" featuring a total number of 11 tracks. Of which, included in the album was an audio track of Tok sharing his thoughts with his peers from Campus Superstar. The album charted at No. 8 in Singapore's CD Rama stores and one of the album tracks, "和时间一起旅行" peaked at No.15 on the Radio Billboard Chart (醉心龙虎榜) for 5 weeks in a row. Later in 2011, Tok was nominated as the Most Popular Newcomer for the Singapore Hit Awards hosted by Y.E.S. 93.3FM.

In 2014, the Digital Version of "Travel With Time 和时间一起旅行" was released onto iTunes as an EP Album with only 6 tracks available. The album re-entered the iTunes 'Top Album Chart' and peaked at No.7.

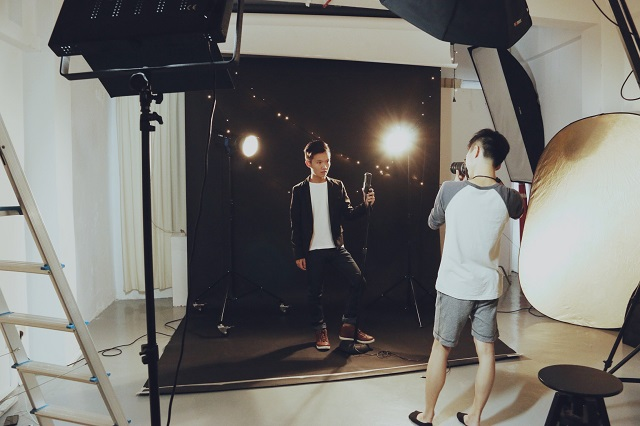
Shawn on "Tomorrow" MTV Shoot

Before studying in the University of Queensland, Tok released a single in July 2014, titled 'Tomorrow' a day prior to his departure. The track illuminates the sentiments Tok had prior to his departure as he transits into the next phase of his life.

The success and sales of the single exceeded expectations given that it was self-released with no commercialised production and promotion involved. It entered the iTunes Top 15 chart in less than an hour of release and peaked at No. 2 in less than half a day.

Filmed in a professional studio with a simple video concept, the Music Video for the single was self-directed by Tok and assisted by his team. The music video portrays Tok's emotions, showing snippets of his farewell at the airport along with those of the studio shoot.

=== 2016 ===
On 8 January 2016, Tok released his English-language Extended Play, Chapter 22, which was launched on his 22nd birthday. 'Chapter 22' offers pensive, openhearted stories rendered in a fair mix of upbeat melodies and ballad tones. The album choruses’ beautifully cinematic pieces, underpinned by a phase in life where you find yourself opening new doors but on the parallel, closing some. The composed exudes the most vulnerable and honest emotions as Tok sings with maturity beyond his 22 years. It brings you closer to home, where the heart is. Tok helmed the production of 22, managed and planned the record from Australia (where he's based), from selecting the tracks to the recording arrangement and the album art design. The record was supposed to have coincided with Tok 21st birthday, but was pushed back due to production and scheduling issues. After the album's release, Tok performed "Feels Like Home" on web stream Toggle, and "Perfectly Strangers" on Mediacorp Channel 5’s "Not The 5 Show" in February 2016.

The album consist of 5 brand-new tracks, with a feature with actress, Shelia Tan. Mediacorp's SuperBand Winner, Nic Lee as well as Singapore Idol finalist, Daphne Khoo contributed in song writing and composing.

== Personal life ==
Tok studied in Loyang Secondary School.

== Discography ==
=== Singles ===
Single #	Single Information
1	木乃伊: Released: August 2007 (Singapore); Album: Best of 校园 Superstar 2007; Language: Mandarin Chinese; Label: Mediacorp
2	In Synergy: Released: June 2008 (Singapore); Album: -; Language: English; Label: Ministry of Education Singapore
3	和时间一起旅行: Released: June 2011 (Singapore); Album: 和时间一起旅行; Language: Mandarin Chinese; Label: NoonTalk Media
4	Tomorrow: Released: July 2014 (Singapore); Album: -; Language: English; Label: -
5	Perfectly Strangers: Released: January 2016 (Singapore); Album: Chapter 22 (EP); Language: English; Label: -
6	Exposure: Released: August 2017 (Singapore); Album: -; Language: English; Label: -
7	Young: Released: June 2019 (Singapore); Album: -; Language: English; Label: -

=== Studio album ===
Album #	Album Information
1	Travel With Time《和时间一起旅行》: Released: June 2011 (Singapore); Type: Solo; Track(s): 11; Language: Mandarin Chinese; Label: NoonTalk
2	Chapter 22: Released: 2016 (Singapore); Type: Solo; Track(s): 5; Language: English

=== Compilation album ===
Year	Title
2007	Best of Campus SuperStar II Compilation Album 《校园SuperStar II》
2007	December Stars Christmas Compilation Album 《新传媒群星英语圣诞》
2008	Kids Central School House Rockz Compilation Album 《儿童聚点频道音乐剧》
2009	MediaCorp Lunar New Year Compilation Album 《群星贺岁金鼠庆团圆》
2011	Eco Music Challenge Compilation Album

== Filmography ==
TELEVISION DRAMAS
Year	Title	Role	Notes
2008	Heng Or Huat 《天降运财》	6128	Telemovie
2008	Kids Central Schoolhouse Rockz 《儿童聚点频道音乐剧》	Fu Wen Bin	Singapore Musical
2010	MediaCorp Channel 5 Seven Days	Eddie	
2011	MediaCorp Channel 8 Stranded 《荒岛冒险记》	Ling Tian Bao	Filmed in Indonesia
2012	Okto Dream School	Jason	Singapore Musical

== List of awards & nominations ==
=== Singapore Hit Awards 17 ===
Year	Nominated work	Award	Result
2011	和时间一起旅行	Most Popular Newcomer	Nominated

Preceded by Ng Chee Yang	Winner of Campus SuperStar; 2007	Succeeded by Jarod Lee
