= Roy Li =

Singaporean singer

Roy Li 黎沸揮
- Roy Li

Background information
- Also known as: Li Feihui
- Born: Roy Li Fey Huei; 12 July 1965 (age 60)
- Origin: Singapore
- Genres: Mandarin pop
- Occupations: Actor, singer
- Instruments: Guitar, piano
- Years active: 1988 –present

Roy Li Fey Huei, more commonly or affectionally known as Li Fei Hui (Traditional Chinese: 黎沸揮), is a singer from Singapore. For the past two decades, besides penning his own songs and producing his own albums, the musician has been writing and producing songs for artists of the region, such as Andy Lau and Jeff Chang. In 201r, he acted and sang in Channel 8 drama 118.

He has also written songs for Jacky Cheung, Kelly Poon, Tanya Chua, and A-do. He runs a music school, Imagine Music. He participated as one of the judges in the reality singing competitions Project Superstar & Campus SuperStar.

== Biography ==
Roy was born in Brunei, on 12 July 1965. He is 170 cm tall. He started to pen his own songs in 1986, at the age of 21. In the same year, three of his songs were published and sung by artists of the Mando-pop scene. In total, he released five albums in Singapore, three albums in Taiwan, and ten compilations in the past twenty years of his career.

<<愛如潮水>>, a prominent classic hit penned by Roy, catapulted Jeff Chang to instant stardom in 1994. Inevitably, this song managed to top the charts of countless radio stations in Asia, karaoke play lists, cell phone ringtone downloads charts, etc. In addition to this, <<愛如潮水>> has also garnered the likes of Hong Kong's Andy Lau, as he chose to re-sing and compile it in one of his albums.

Besides penning songs for commercial purposes, the patriotic Roy has also written and published the theme song for the President Star Charity Show in 1994. He specially played this piece of composition on the piano in his 1994 album, in dedication to the then-president of Singapore, Ong Teng Cheong.

After dwelling and carving a niche for himself in Taiwan for 8 years, he decided to return to Singapore and joined Tinybox Music as a music consultant. Besides being the music director for Kelly Poon's debut album, Love Me, Kelly, his self-written songs are also compiled in it.

In November 2006, he left Tinybox Music and established his own music school, Imagine Music.

Project Superstar 2nd season's contestants – Nathaniel Tan (runner up for the male category), Jeremy Kwan, Jeff Teay, are currently under his meticulous tutelage at Focus Music. Roy is also known as a judge of the previous 2 seasons of Project Superstar and Campus SuperStar.

== Selected awards and nominations ==
1994 – 2nd 93.3 FM Hit Awards – Nomination for Best Local Artiste
1994 – 2nd 93.3 FM Hit Awards – Nomination for Best Local Music Composition
1995 – 3rd 93.3 FM Hit Awards – Nomination for Best Local Artiste
2000 – 7th 93.3 FM Hit Awards – Best Lyricist
2004 – COMPASS Awards – Best Local Chinese Pop song
2018 – Star Awards Best Theme Song (《小人物向前冲》Life Less Ordinary)

== Albums ==
| Year | Title in Chinese | English |
|---|---|---|
| 1988 | 《請在我心經過》 | Please pass through my heart |
| 1989 | 《改變》 | Change |
| 1990 | 《只有你能完成我的歌》 | Only you can finish/complete my song |
| 1992 | 《等你等到我心痛》 | Waited for you till my heart ached |
| 1994 | 《說走就走》 | Time flies, Love flies |
| 1996 | 《想著你的人》 | Thinking Of You |
| 1997 | 《亂飛》 | Puff Away |

== Television ==
=== Chinese/Dialect Series ===
| Year | Title | Role | Notes |
|---|---|---|---|
| 2014–2015 | 118 | Zhang Meiyou 张没友 | Mediacorp Channel 8 男配角 Supporting Role |
| 2017 | 118 II | Zhang Meiyou 张没友 | Mediacorp Channel 8 男配角 Supporting Role; Performed and Wrote 最近，蒙蒙的，干杯 and 最最最好的 as the Sub-Theme Songs |
| 2018 | 118 Reunion | Zhang Meiyou 张没友 | Mediacorp Channel 8 男配角 Supporting Role |
| 2019 | How Are You? 好世谋 | Gong Qinghu 龚清湖 | Mediacorp Channel 8 男配角: Pairs up with Cynthia Koh Supporting Role Performed and Wrote Opening Theme Song 《好势谋》 |
| 2020 | How Are You 2? 好世谋 2 | Gong Qinghu 龚清湖 | Mediacorp Channel 8 男配角: Pairs up with Cynthia Koh Supporting Role Performed and Wrote Opening Theme Song 《好势谋》 |
