= Star Search (Singaporean TV series) season 12 =

Star Search
- Season 12
- Hosted by: Lee Teng (auditions, semifinal); Herman Keh (auditions); Hazelle Teo (auditions); Joakim Gomez (auditions); Guo Liang (bootcamp); Dennis Chew (bootcamp); Sheila Sim (semifinal); Quan Yifeng (semifinal, final); Jeff Goh (final)
- No. of contestants: 20
- Winner: Tiffany Ho
- Winning mentor: Lee Teng; Yeo Yann Yann
- Runner-up: Gladys Bay
- No. of episodes: 5

Release
- Original network: Mediacorp Channel 8 meWatch; YouTube
- Original release: 20 October – 24 November 2024

Season chronology
- ← Previous; Season 11

Star Search 2024 is the 12th installment of the long-running Chinese talent competition Star Search, hosted by Mediacorp, which first premiered in 1988. The season premiered on 20 October and concluded on 24 November.

Hong Kong-based Nanyang Polytechnic student Tiffany Ho was named the winner of the season, with breakdancer Gladys Bay finished as runner-up and swimming coach Jona Chung finishing in third place. Ho was the first female winner in Star Search in 21 years since Felicia Chin back in season eight, and not counting the male-female champion format between seasons four and eight, Ho was the first overall female winner in 31 years since Ivy Lee back in season three. Ho won a Mediacorp management contract along with a BYD Auto vehicle (without a Certificate of Entitlement) won by each finalist in the top three. Six contestants from this season besides the two runner-ups were also signed to Mediacorp a month later on 24 December, with Amy Ang signing to its content creator network Bloomr.SG; Bay, Chung, Chua Seng Jin, Gladys Ng, Ler Ka Ying, June Tan, and Tan Zi Sheng were signed on The Celebrity Agency.

== Development ==
The season was announced on 21 June 2024 via various social media platforms and its Chinese news website 8world, announcing a theme of X Factor. To promote the season, three rounds of meet-and-greet sessions with various Mediacorp celebrities were held from 28 to 30 June at Orchard Central. Last season's runner-up Herman Keh, along with Chen Ning JJ Neo, Richie Koh, Sammi Tan, Tyler Ten and Zhai Siming, hosted the first day; Ben Yeo, Bonnie Loo, Daryl-Ann Jensen, Denise Camillia Tan, Fang Rong, Hazelle Teo, Jeremy Chan, Lim Pin Juen, Tan Ting Fong, Tay Ying and Yunis To in the second day; last season's top three Ye Jia Yun, Herman Keh and winner Zhang Zetong, along with Benjamin Tan, Hong Ling, Jensen Wang, Jernelle Oh, JJ Neo, Lim Pin Juen, Seow Sin Nee and Sheryl Ang, on the third.

=== Auditions ===
The auditions were announced on 22 June 2024 and applications opened until 13 July 2024, applicable for aspirants with ages between 17 and 30, and go through either rounds of auditions for a place in the live shows. In addition to the open auditions, talent scouts across five different polytechnics were also held prior to open auditions.

Summary of Open Auditions
| Date and time(s) | Venue |
|---|---|
| 6 and 7 July 2024, 9.30am-7.30pm | Funan, Singapore |
| 13 July 2024, 9.30am-7.30pm | Orchard Central |

Following the audition and rounds of selections, the show announced on 23 August that they have shortlisted 20 contestants to compete this season, but not explicitly told of the names of the hopefuls at the time of announcement; they also revealed that these contestants had to attend masterclasses hosted by various celebrities and industry experts for two months thru September. The top 20 cast for the season include a married breakdancer couple, an online influencer, a contestant of Thai and Chinese heritage (Gladys Ng), a contestant of Indian and Chinese heritage (Sufeia Azura Sunir), some sporting professionals and one loyal viewer of Channel 8 dramas.

=== Marketing ===
BYD Auto replaces Audi as its official car this season, with the top three finalists winning a BYD car each (BYD Seal, Atto 3 and Dolphin for the winner, runner-up and third place finalists, respectively). Mitsubishi Electric is the only sponsor to return from the previous season. New and known sponsors for this season were Holistic Way, Recogen and Shopee.

== Contestants ==
The 20 contestants were announced on 12 September, as follows:

- – Winner
- – Runner-up
- – Third place
- – Fourth place
- – Fifth place
- – Finalists

| Act | Age(s) | Occupation | Gender | Profession | Semifinals Team | Finals Mentor | Result |
|---|---|---|---|---|---|---|---|
| Tiffany Ho 何睿烔 | 19 | Student | Female | Acting | Lee Teng | Yeo Yann Yann | Winner |
| Gladys Bay 马䲰娗 | 28 | Breakdancer | Female | Hosting | Lee Teng | Yeo Yann Yann | Runner-up |
| Jona Chung 仲伟杰 | 25 | Sporting coach | Male | Hosting | Lee Teng | Qi Yuwu | Third place |
| Chua Seng Jin 蔡承峻 | 25 | Freelancer | Male | Acting | Lee Teng | Qi Yuwu | Fourth place |
| Marcus Sim 沈伟洋 | 27 | Designer/Breakdancer | Male | Hosting | Quan Yifeng | Yeo Yann Yann | Fifth place |
| Amy Ang 洪依嬣 | 21 | Influencer | Female | Hosting | Lee Teng | Yeo Yann Yann | Finalists |
| Ler Ka Ying 吕佳颖 | 28 | Freelancer | Female | Hosting | Quan Yifeng | Qi Yuwu | Finalists |
| Jadon Lim 林义豪 | 23 | Student/model | Male | Acting | Lee Teng | Qi Yuwu | Finalists |
| Gladys Ng 黄慧燕 | 24 | Student | Female | Acting | Quan Yifeng | Qi Yuwu | Finalists |
| June Tan 陈瑞敏 | 25 | Postgraduate | Female | Hosting | Quan Yifeng | Qi Yuwu | Finalists |
| Tan Zi Sheng 陈子盛 | 21 | Student | Male | Acting | Lee Teng | Yeo Yann Yann | Finalists |
| Clement Yeo 杨岳翰 | 25 | Student/actor | Male | Acting | Quan Yifeng | Yeo Yann Yann | Finalists |
| Heng Jee Kuan 邢诒光 | 22 | Student/model | Male | Acting | Quan Yifeng | — | Eliminated |
| Koh Boon Wun 许文恩 | 17 | Student | Female | Acting | Lee Teng | — | Eliminated |
| Lee Ting Xuan 李亭萱 | 19 | Student | Female | Acting | Quan Yifeng | — | Eliminated |
| Mitchell Lim 林铭轩 | 23 | Artist | Male | Hosting | Lee Teng | — | Eliminated |
| Christopher Ng 吴剑宏 | 24 | Freelancer | Male | Acting | Quan Yifeng | — | Eliminated |
| Sufeia Azura Sunir 李思萱 | 17 | Student | Female | Acting | Quan Yifeng | — | Eliminated |
| Alina Tan 陈致嘉 | 22 | Undergraduate | Female | Acting | Lee Teng | — | Eliminated |
| Gino Wong 王贤耀 | 25 | Actor | Male | Hosting | Quan Yifeng | — | Eliminated |

== Semifinal ==
The semifinal stage were broadcast over three taped 90-minute episodes from 20 October thru 3 November. All episodes provide closed captioning, unless otherwise stated. Unlike the previous seasons, all episodes are given a parental guidance rating similar to other primetime programs.

=== Episode 1: The Search for Stars - 寻星之路 (20 October) ===
The first episode covers highlights based on the two rounds of open audition, including the Emotion (which enact a script given by the producers) and Charm (which test on charisma, physical and mental fortitude, or fashion detail) challenges covered by the contestants, as well as Talent Scouts across the five Polytechnics.

=== Episode 2: The Making of A Star - 磨砺蜕变 (27 October) ===
The second episode features the Top 20 contestants attending a 29-day masterclass (大师班) and training inside a private "Talent House" bungalow, from several professional artists, producers, designers and studio management, hosted by Dennis Chew and Guo Liang. The results for each of segments and its featured contestants were as follows:

| Part | Day(s) | Synopsis | Advisors |
|---|---|---|---|
| Articulation and linguistics | 1-5 | Narrate a drafted script from Star Awards to test articulation and linguistics. | Dennis Chew; Guo Liang |
| Stage presence and body language | 6-9 | Taking a personal selfie of a contestant, without relying assistance, then a catwalk, and shoe wearing to train adaptability. | Ade; Sheila Sim |
| Drama technique | 10 | Acting in a simulated disaster scenario, by testing on character and display empathy. | Loh Woon Woon |
| Body movement | 11-14 | Take part in body exercises and form in groups of five contestants, performed a scenario to test creativity. | Nelson Seah; Yeo Yann Yann |
| Product placement | 15-19 | Continued from stage presence, contestants have to take certain shots to promote a product. (in order: BYD Seal, Holistic Way, a Shopee advertorial) | Ade; Sheila Sim |
| Acting coordination | 20-25 | Group into 10 pairs of two contestants to act in a simulated environment. | Loh Woon Woon; Qi Yuwu |
| Personal styling | 26-27 | Under advisory from guest stylists, contestants come with a creative costume design. Two contestants were selected for a makeover to display transformation. | Jeremy Tan; Frederick Lee; Peter Khor |
| Interview | 28 | Simulate an interview. If the contestant was able to perform well in the first two questions, a third question may be offered. | Dennis Chew; Marcus Chin; Guo Liang |
| Voiceover | 29 | Simulate in a radio drama using provided scripts. | Dennis Chew; Jeff Koh |

The contestant's potential profession are revealed at the end of the episode, with eight aligned to hosting profession, and the other 12 aligned to acting.

=== Episode 3: The Knockout - 对决之日 (3 November) ===
The top 20 contestants compete in a series of three tasks assigned by production, and are judged by Mark Lee, Kym Ng and season one winner Zoe Tay. These contestants are grouped into teams of two, helmed by either Lee Teng or Quan Yifeng, to complete these challenges, which are:

1. Conduct a photoshoot directed by Sheila Sim. Team Lee contestants took a picture with a horse at Singapore Polo Club, while Team Quan contestants took a picture with porcelain at Thow Kwang Pottery Jungle industry factory;
2. Through drawing of lots into ten teams of two (one per gender) based on their current teams from the first task, contestants are assigned to certain hosting-related tasks inside each BYD car, then scout across Paya Lebar and SingPost Centre to complete the tasks; and
3. Through drawing of numbered lots into ten teams of two (one per gender), disregarding initial teams, these contestants must portray a two-minute simulated emotional scene in front of the aforementioned judges; the task was filmed in one of three colored rooms located at ArtSafe, with each room changing after the third and seventh scene.

Eight contestants were eliminated after the episode. The summary for each of the contestant's tasks (in order of appearance) and the final results (weighted percentages of scores in parentheses) were:

| Act | Task 1 (30%) | | Task 2 (35%) | | Task 3 (35%) | | | Result |
| Act | Order | Task | Order | Task | Room | Order | Task | Result |
|---|---|---|---|---|---|---|---|---|
| Amy Ang | 1 | Horse | 7 | Ask a female to dance together, and ask the female to share about her first dance | Black | 9 | Disgust | Advanced |
| Gladys Bay | 1 | Horse | 9 | Find a male to do a hairstylist by a female contestant, then ask the male to share about his favorite haircut | Blue | 6 | Sorrow | Advanced |
| Tiffany Ho | 1 | Horse | 3 | Interview a customer on their favorite food | Red | 2 | Joy | Advanced |
| Koh Boon Wun | 1 | Horse | 5 | Interview a couple under 40s on their strengths and weaknesses | Red | 3 | Embarrassment | Eliminated |
| Lee Ting Xuan | 2 | Porcelain | 6 | Teach a student three relaxation exercises | Black | 10 | Envy | Eliminated |
| Ler Ka Ying | 2 | Porcelain | 10 | Find a person with a height over 170cm to share a trendy product | Blue | 5 | Disappointment | Advanced |
| Gladys Ng | 2 | Porcelain | 2 | Interview with a children under 10 years old about their favorite animal | Black | 8 | Fearful | Advanced |
| Sufeia Azura Sunir | 2 | Porcelain | 4 | Ask people to pose the alphabets of ACT | Blue | 4 | Admiration | Eliminated |
| Alina Tan | 1 | Horse | 1 | Take a photo with a person with big eyes | Blue | 7 | Distraught | Eliminated |
| June Tan | 2 | Porcelain | 8 | Interview with a person carrying a backpack and ask to take one item as a travel essential | Red | 1 | Furious | Advanced |
| Chua Seng Jin | 1 | Horse | 1 | Take a photo with a person with big eyes | Red | 2 | Joy | Advanced |
| Jona Chung | 1 | Horse | 5 | Interview a couple under 40s on their strengths and weaknesses | Blue | 4 | Admiration | Advanced |
| Heng Jee Kuan | 2 | Porcelain | 2 | Interview with a children under 10 years old about their favorite animal | Blue | 7 | Distraught | Eliminated |
| Jadon Lim | 1 | Horse | 3 | Interview a customer on their favorite food | Black | 9 | Disgust | Advanced |
| Mitchell Lim | 1 | Horse | 9 | Find a male to do a hairstylist by a female contestant, then ask the male to share about his favorite haircut | Blue | 5 | Disappointment | Eliminated |
| Christopher Ng | 2 | Porcelain | 10 | Find a person with a height over 170cm to share a trendy product | Red | 3 | Embarrassment | Eliminated |
| Marcus Sim | 2 | Porcelain | 6 | Teach a student three relaxation exercises | Black | 10 | Envy | Advanced |
| Tan Zi Sheng | 1 | Horse | 7 | Ask a female to dance together, and ask the female to share about her first dance | Blue | 6 | Sorrow | Advanced |
| Gino Wong | 2 | Porcelain | 4 | Ask people to pose the alphabets of ACT | Black | 8 | Fearful | Eliminated |
| Clement Yeo | 2 | Porcelain | 8 | Interview with a person carrying a backpack and ask to take one item as a travel essential | Red | 1 | Furious | Advanced |

== Final ==
=== Episode 4: The Prelude to Finale - 终极冲刺 (10 November) ===
In the pre-finale episode, through the one-minute aptitude tests which involve script reprisals of drama serial scenes, both Qi and Yeo handpicked six contestants to serve as their respective mentors for the final and which films they will partake in the final. The episode also shows behind-the-scenes footage of the short films and supporters from each of the finalists.

=== Episode 5: The Final Battle - 决赛之夜 (24 November) ===
Unlike the first four episodes, the final was a live broadcast and no closed captioning were provided (except for the Drama segment). The guest judges for the finale were Raymond Lam, Christopher Lee and Sandra Ng. The guest performers for the finale were Desmond Ng performing the theme song of "飞高梦远" (backed by a live band and chorus singers), and Tasha Low performing her single "Everything You Wanted". The episode reran with post-production edits on 30 November.

==== Rounds 1 and 2: X-Factor and Dance skit ====
For these two rounds, contestants performed their own expertise and one dance skit. The X-Factor segment and Dance skit carries 25% and 15% weightage towards the final scores respectively.

| Act | X-Factor | | Dance skit | |
| Act | Order | Description | Order | Description |
|---|---|---|---|---|
| Gladys Bay | 1 | Performed square dancing | 1 | Performed a "city of lights"-themed dance |
| Ler Ka Ying | 2 | Performed a pipa rendition of "十面埋伏" | 1 | Performed a "city of lights"-themed dance |
| Tiffany Ho | 4 | Performed a fan dance | 1 | Performed a "city of lights"-themed dance |
| Marcus Sim | 7 | Performed breakdancing | 1 | Performed a "city of lights"-themed dance |
| Jona Chung | 8 | Performed parkour | 1 | Performed a "city of lights"-themed dance |
| Tan Zi Sheng | 9 | Performed basketball stunts | 1 | Performed a "city of lights"-themed dance |
| June Tan | 3 | Performed a piano piece of "圆舞曲" | 2 | Performed a carnival-themed dance |
| Amy Ang | 5 | Performed a Chinese play | 2 | Performed a carnival-themed dance |
| Gladys Ng | 6 | Performed a Thai traditional folk dance | 2 | Performed a carnival-themed dance |
| Jadon Lim | 10 | Performed an erhu rendition of "赛马" | 2 | Performed a carnival-themed dance |
| Chua Seng Jin | 11 | Performed callanetics | 2 | Performed a carnival-themed dance |
| Clement Yeo | 12 | Performed Taiwanese opera of "状元楼" | 2 | Performed a carnival-themed dance |

During Jadon Lim's X-Factor segment, a viral screenshot about an unpeeled $450 price tag pasted in his erhu was visible. Lim confirmed that it was loaned from the Chinese Orchestra group from Nanyang Technological University after his own erhu was broken, and there was no involvement in theft.

==== Round 3: Eloquence Round ====
Round three carries a 30% score towards the final score. In this round, contestants drew lots on questions issued by each celebrity (acting as respective characters in selected scenes). Contestants have 25 seconds to present their answers for the scenarios. Dennis Chew co-lead each of the segments.

| Act | Order | Celebrity | Selected scene | Eloquence Question |
|---|---|---|---|---|
| Ler Ka Ying | 1 | Yao Wenlong | The Little Nyonya | You are posting vacation image on social media; your friend responded "is that cool?", and how do you react? |
| Marcus Sim | 2 | Richie Koh | Cash on Delivery | Your friend borrowed your money but did not return since. How would you respond from this? |
| Gladys Bay | 3 | Kym Ng | Till the End | You are on leave and taking a plane flight, and you noticed your company boss in the same flight. Would you pretend not to watch or meet up? |
| Tan Zi Sheng | 4 | Hong Ling | Unforgivable | You received an unsophisticated phone call from someone claiming it was your long-lost friend. How do you react? |
| Tiffany Ho | 5 | Brandon Wong | Joys of Life | You met your celebrity inside a toilet; after a moment of admiration, what do you do? |
| Jona Chung | 6 | Carrie Wong | A Quest to Heal | You are on a date and you accidentally hang up the phone call while making a confession. What can you do from this? |
| Jadon Lim | 7 | Zhang Zetong | All That Glitters | You, as a host, are interviewing an actor who doesn't speak often; how do you break the ice? |
| Gladys Ng | 8 | Yao Wenlong | The Little Nyonya | You met your friend you haven't see for a long time, and your friend forgot your name. Do you react politely or act negatively? |
| Clement Yeo | 9 | Zhu Zheliang | Star Search | You are in a student gathering and you noticed someone you dislike entering the party; do you stay or leave the place? |
| Amy Ang | 10 | Desmond Tan | A Song to Remember | If you find out that your best friend’s significant other is your ex, will you choose to hide it or tell this friend? |
| Chua Seng Jin | 11 | Desmond Tan | A Song to Remember | You noticed your friend is spreading negative words inside a gym. Do you confront them or pretend to do nothing? |
| June Tan | 12 | Kym Ng | The Sheng Siong Show | Your mother noticed her favorite shirt is missing, and you noticed you accidentally discarded it. How do you react? |

==== Round 4: Short film ====
This round carries a 30% score towards the final score. In the final round, the 12 finalists were divided into two groups to participate in either one of two short films.

Acting Description
| Order | Drama | Mentor | Director | Guest Actor | Cast (in order of appearance) |
|---|---|---|---|---|---|
| 1 | Theatre Of Life (人生剧场) | Yeo Yann Yann | Cho Jun Ming | Lina Ng (as sister Mei) | Tan Zi Sheng (as Wen Hui), Amy Ang (as Xiaohui), Gladys Bay (as Wendy), Tiffany Ho (as Sam), Marcus Sim (as Johnny), and Clement Yeo (as Ah Hua) |
| 2 | Talent Theatre (才华剧场) | Qi Yuwu | Jun Chong | Andie Chen (as unnamed director) | June Tan (as Emily), Jona Chung (as Ah Jie), Jadon Lim (as Wei Qiang), Gladys Ng (as Ah Jac), Chua Seng Jin (as Mark), and Ler Ka Ying (as Meifang) |

==== Overall result ====
| Award | Result |
|---|---|
| Fifth place | Marcus Sim 沈伟洋 |
| Fourth place | Chua Seng Jin 蔡承峻 |
| Third place | Jona Chung 仲伟杰 |
| Runner-up | Gladys Bay 马䲰娗 |
| Winner | Tiffany Ho 何睿烔 |
