= Star Search (disambiguation) =

Star Search is an American talent television series.

Star Search may also refer to:

- Star Search (Singaporean TV series), similar Singaporean TV series:
  - Star Search (Singaporean season 8)
  - Star Search (Singaporean season 9)
  - Star Search (Singaporean season 10)
  - Star Search (Singaporean season 11)
- Starsearch, similar Samoan television series broadcast by Samoa Broadcasting Corporation
