= Alice Ho =

Alice Ho may refer to:

- Alice Ho (composer)
- Alice Ho (actress)
