= Tiffany Ho =

Tiffany Ho may refer to:

- Tiffany Ho (badminton)
- Tiffany Ho (actress)
