= Last Madame: Sisters of the Night =

2023 Singaporean television series

- Promotional poster
- Traditional Chinese: 夜櫻
- Simplified Chinese: 夜樱
- Hanyu Pinyin: Yè yīng
- Genre: Erotic historical drama
- Inspired by: Last Madame by Adeline Foo
- Written by: Jean Yeo; C. Merquita
- Story by: Jean Yeo; Yvonne Loh
- Directed by: Rowena Loh
- Starring: Gini Chang; Fang Rong; Yusuke Fukuchi; Min Ji-oh; Zhang Zetong; Cynthia MacQuarrie; Gavin Yap; Andrew J Mowatt; Terence Cao; Lim Kay Tong
- Narrated by: Joanne Peh
- Country of origin: Singapore
- Original language: English
- No. of episodes: 10

Production
- Executive producers: Jean Yeo; Pedro Tan
- Producer: Sim Jin Lin
- Cinematography: Alan Ang
- Editor: Liu Zhi Juan
- Running time: approx. 60 minutes
- Production company: Ochre Pictures

Original release
- Network: meWATCH; Mediacorp Drama on YouTube
- Release: 13 July – 20 July 2023

Related
- Last Madame (2019)

Last Madame: Sisters of the Night is a 2023 Singaporean erotic period drama series created and executive produced by Jean Yeo of Ochre Pictures. Serving as the prequel to Last Madame (2019) and set in the 1920s, the series premiered on meWATCH, Netflix on 13 July 2023 and Mediacorp YouTube Drama channel on 20 July 2023.

== Cast ==
- Gini Chang as Nozomi (young Ah Yoke)
- Fang Rong as Qing Ling (young Fung Lan)
- Yusuke Fukuchi as Daisuke
- Min Ji-oh as Hidemi
- Zhang Zetong as Ah Tou
- Cynthia MacQuarrie as Okasan
- Lim Kay Tong as Master Chen
- Terence Cao as Lou Seh
- Andrew J Mowatt as Graham
- Gavin Yap as Philip
- Jo Tan as Madame Chen
- Neal Moore as Blythe
- Lareina Tham as Nari
- Shi Lim as Ayaka
- Vivianne Li as Momoka
- Cheryl Lee as Hana
- Charmain Tan as Kiku
- Maguire Jian Zhao En as Ah Fook
- Skye Yap as Ah Chye

== Episodes ==
Episode	Title
1	"Sakura No. 3"
2	"Rebirth"
3	"Killer Arrogance"
4	"Best Laid Plans"
5	"White Lies"
6	"Desperate Measures"
7	"Turnabout"
8	"One Last Goodbye"
9	"Trust Issues"
10	"Sunrise (Finale)"

== Awards and nominations ==
Award ceremony	Year	Category	Nominee(s)	Result	Ref.
Asian Academy Creative Awards	2023	Best Original Productions by a Streamer/OTT (national winner - Singapore)	—N/a	Won	
Asian Academy Creative Awards	2023	Best Direction (Fiction) (national winner - Singapore)	Rowena Loh	Won	
Asia Contents Awards & Global OTT Awards	2023	Best Newcomer Actress	Gini Chang	Nominated	
