= Saint Anthony's Canossian Secondary School =

St. Anthony's Canossian Secondary School
- 圣安东尼女子中学; Sekolah Menengah; St Anthony's Canossian

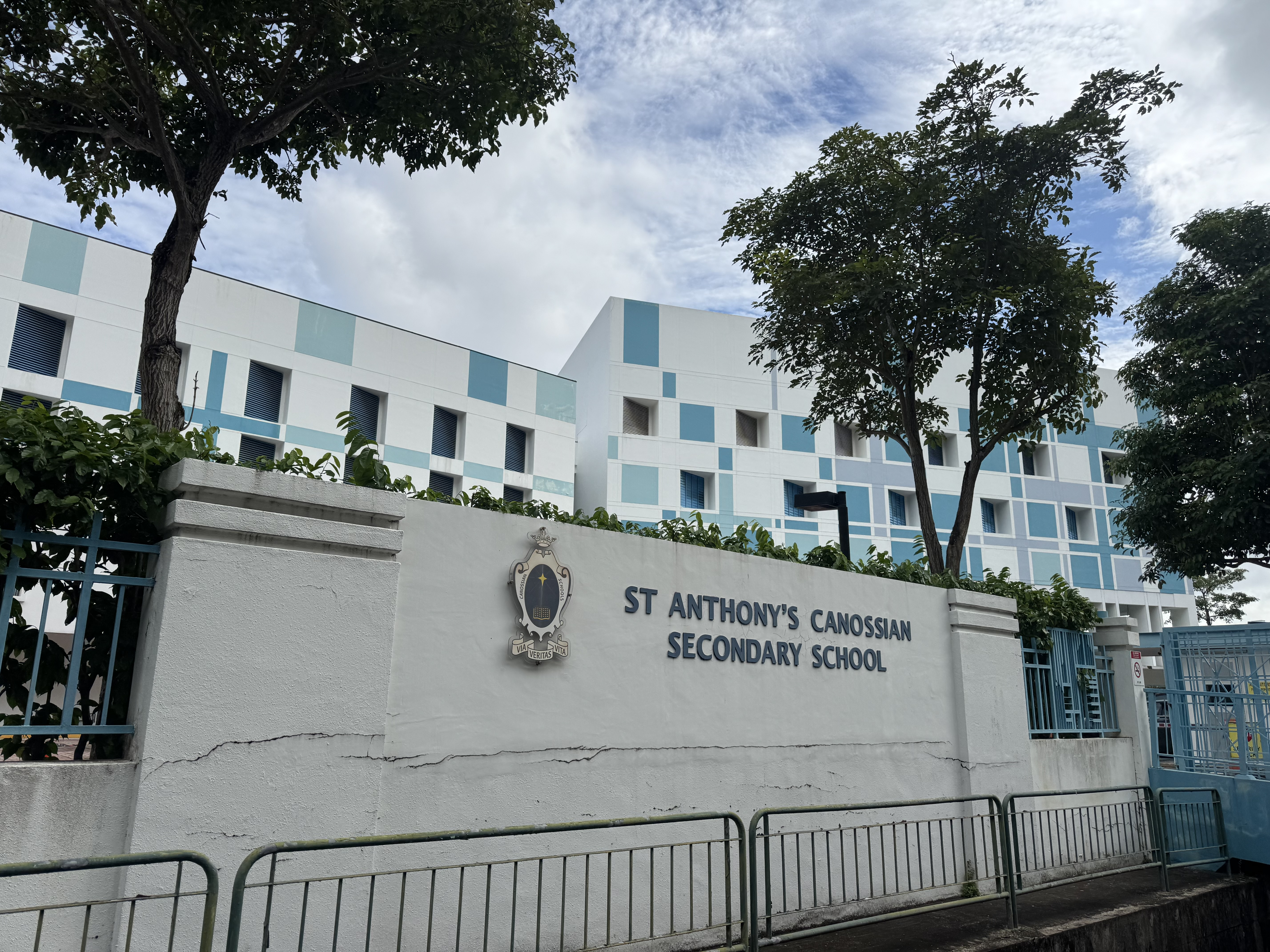
- Saint Anthony’s Canossian Secondary School in 2025

Location
- 1600 Bedok North Avenue 4, 469700; Singapore; 1.3349°N 103.9414°E

Information
- Type: Autonomous
- Motto: Via, Veritas, Vita (The Way, The Truth, The Life)
- Religious affiliation: Christianity (Catholic)
- Established: 1879
- Session: Single session
- School code: 7016
- Principal: Fiona Koh
- Gender: Female
- Colour: Light Blue White
- Website: www.stanthonyscanossiansec.moe.edu.sg

St. Anthony's Canossian Secondary School (SACSS) is a government-aided autonomous Catholic girls' secondary school located in Bedok, Singapore. It is part of the Canossian family of Catholic girls' schools in Singapore.

The school is well regarded for its dance and drama programmes, which widened students' appreciation of arts as well as cater to the unique needs of students with different artistic talents through the expanded range of programmes.

It educates deaf students who do not need to use sign language to communicate.

== History ==
In August 1879, Father Jose Pedro Santa Anna de Cunha of Saint Joseph's Church started a school for poor parishioners. As a result, the Saint Anna's School with an enrolment of six students opened in Middle Road. In 1886, the school became known as Saint Anthony's Boys' & Girls' School. The boys' and girls' school split 15 years later. The first four Canossian sisters arrived to run the Portuguese Mission school, and there the poor and neglected found refuge. The younger girls attended school while the older ones learned sewing and embroidery. The 1900s marked the beginning of a new era for the school. Saint Anthony's Girls' School was renamed Saint Anthony's Convent in 1906. Subsequently, a new chapel, quarters for the nuns, a kindergarten and first Junior Cambridge class (equivalent to Secondary 3 or 4) were added.

The school buildings survived World War II and the Japanese occupation of Singapore. The Japanese military police took over the school and the sisters were placed under house arrest. When the war ended, the buildings were used to house war orphans. In 1952, the wooden convent was demolished and a five-storey building was constructed in its place. The following year, the new school was officially opened. This five-story building, located at 111 Middle Road still stands today, and houses the National Design Centre.

In 2002, the school introduced a new uniform to commemorate its first year of being a government-aided autonomous girls' school. 2002 ended with a watershed historical event of the handover of stewardship of SACSS to its first lay principal in its 108-year history. Sister Cecily Pavri, being the last Canossian nun to lead the school, handed over the reins of leadership to vice-principal Jennifer Loh on 1 January 2003. In 2002, the school received recognition for its niche in performing arts education.

=== Present-day ===
SACSS clinched the Ministry of Education's Best Practice Teaching and Learning Award in 2007. The school was accorded the School Distinction Award by the Ministry of Education in 2008, and subsequently the Singapore Quality Class award in 2009 and MOE Character Development Award in 2010.

In January 2011, SACSS underwent renovations through the PRIME program. Construction was slated to be completed by the end of 2012. Classes were held at temporary premises in Changi. The school maintains relationships with other students from Roman Catholic schools in Singapore such as the all-boys Saint Patrick's School and the CHIJ family of girls' schools.

== Affiliation ==
SACSS is affiliated to:

- Canossa Catholic Primary School
- Saint Anthony's Canossian Primary School
- Catholic Junior College

== Academic information ==
Being a government secondary school, SACSS offers three academic streams, namely the four-year Express course, as well as the Normal Course, comprising Normal (Academic) and Normal (Technical) academic tracks.

=== O Level Express Course ===
The Express Course is a nationwide four-year programme that leads up to the Singapore-Cambridge GCE Ordinary Level examination.

==== Academic subjects ====
The examinable academic subjects for Singapore-Cambridge GCE Ordinary Level offered by the school for upper secondary level (via. streaming in secondary 2 level), as of 2017, are listed below.

Notes:

1. Subjects indicated with ' * ' are mandatory subjects.
2. All students in Singapore are required to undertake a Mother Tongue Language as an examinable subject, as indicated by ' ^ '.
3. "SPA" in Pure Science subjects refers to the incorporation of School-based Science Practical Assessment, which 20% of the subject result in the national examination are determined by school-based practical examinations, supervised by the Singapore Examinations and Assessment Board. The SPA Assessment has been replaced by one Practical Assessment in the 2018 O Levels.

Sciences	Language & Humanities	Arts & Aesthetics
Additional Mathematics*; Mathematics*; Physics (SPA); Chemistry (SPA)*; Biology (SPA); Science (Combined)	English Language*; English Literature; Mother Tongue Language* ^; Higher Mother Tongue Language; Geography; History; Combined Humanities (Social Studies & another Humanities subject at elective level)*	Art; Design & Technology; Food & Nutrition; Music

=== Normal course ===
The normal course is a nationwide four-year programme leading to the Singapore-Cambridge GCE Normal Level examination, which runs either the Normal (Academic) curriculum or Normal (Technical) curriculum, abbreviated as N(A) and N(T) respectively.

==== Normal (academic) course ====
In the normal (academic) course, students offer 5-8 subjects in the Singapore-Cambridge GCE Normal Level examination. Compulsory subjects include:

- English Language
- Mother Tongue Language
- Mathematics
- Combined Humanities

A 5th year leading to the Singapore-Cambridge GCE Ordinary Level examination is available to N(A) students who perform well in their Singapore-Cambridge GCE Normal Level examination. Students can move from one course to another based on their performance and the assessment of the school principal and teachers.

==== Normal (technical) course ====
The normal (technical) course prepares students for a technical-vocational education at the Institute of Technical Education. Students will offer 5-7 subjects in the Singapore-Cambridge GCE Normal Level examination. The curriculum is tailored towards strengthening students’ proficiency in English and Mathematics. Students take English Language, Mathematics, Basic Mother Tongue and Computer Applications as compulsory subjects.

== Notable alumni ==
- Cynthia Koh: actress
- Ezann Lee: actress and host
- Sheryl Ang: actress
- Sonia Chew: radio/tv presenter
