= Star Search (Singaporean TV series) season 11 =

Star Search
- Season 11
- Hosted by: Quan Yi Fong (auditions/talent scout); Dasmond Koh (talent scout); Irene Ang (talent scout); Guo Liang (prelude/live shows); Kym Ng (live shows); Lee Teng (finals)
- Winner: Zhang Zetong
- Winning mentor: Christopher Lee
- Runner-up: Herman Keh

Release
- Original network: MediaCorp Channel 8 Toggle; YouTube
- Original release: 20 September – 8 November 2019

Season chronology
- ← Previous; Season 10 Next → Season 12

Star Search 2019 is the 11th installment of the long-running Chinese talent competition Star Search, hosted by Mediacorp, since 1988. This was the first season of Star Search since 2010, returning after a nine-year hiatus. The grand prize includes a Mediacorp management contract and an Audi Q2 SUV (without Certificate of Entitlement).

The series premiered on 20 September on Toggle and 22 September on both Channel 8 and their YouTube channel. Three live telecast episodes were streamed live on 6 and 13 October (semi-finals), and 3 November (finals). The series concluded on a clip show titled The Journey aired on 8 and 10 November, on Toggle and Channel 8, respectively.

In the finals aired on 3 November, Zhang Zetong, a 26-year-old Carousell assistant manager from Malaysia mentored by Christopher Lee, was announced the winner, while Herman Keh from Team Christopher Lee and Ye Jiayun from Team Chen Hanwei finished second and third, respectively. While the top three contestants were offered a contract and won respective prizes, in an unprecedented move made on 5 November, Mediacorp announced that all 12 finalists were all offered contracts, a first in Star Search history.

== Development ==
The show's revival was first announced by the last season's host Quan Yi Fong and former contestants Christopher Lee and Zoe Tay during the Star Awards 2019 award ceremony held on 14 April 2019 (as part of the award's silver jubilee celebration), after featuring a walk-in showcase performance as one of the performance segments. A teaser clip was first shown on-air on that night, featuring Tay that bragged the show's success, how they changed their lives in their entertainment career and gone on winning awards from Star Awards, while the narrator narrates at the closing of the clip (今天的超级红星, 来自/出自于当年的才华新秀 (lit. The All-time Favorite Artistes that came/first appeared from that year's Star Search); displayed on-screen as 红星出于新秀 (lit. The stars originated from Star Search)); the season will be billed as one of the "biggest returns in television history".

To commemorate the franchise's return, Toggle archived the previous ten seasons of the show's grand finals.

=== Auditions ===
The auditions were announced on 14 April 2019, with the open auditions held in May; other auditions not announced on-air were talent scout auditions, replacing overseas auditions, which were not held for the first time since season five. Contestants could also submit their online applications (for open auditions) until 10 May 2019. Selected contestants from the scouting or closed auditions received an Express Pass (shaped as a chatbox with the show's hashtag) and could directly perform the talent round without having to queue. Known judges who appeared in the auditions include Irene Ang, and former Star Search winners Qi Yuwu and Zoe Tay.

Summary of talent scouts
Date and time(s)	Venue
16 April 2019, 9am-2pm	ITE College Central
16 April 2019, 3pm-6pm	ITE College East
17 April 2019, 9am-5pm	Nanyang Polytechnic
18 April 2019, 9am-5pm	Singapore Polytechnic
22 April 2019, 9am-5pm	Republic Polytechnic
23 April 2019, 9am-5pm	Ngee Ann Polytechnic
24 April 2019, 9am-5pm	Temasek Polytechnic
25 April 2019, 9am-5pm	Bugis/Central Business District
27 April 2019, 11am-5pm	Orchard
29 April 2019, 11am-5pm	Plaza Singapura/The Cathay

Summary of open auditions
Date(s)	Venue
4 May 2019, 10am-7pm	Ngee Ann City Civic Plaza
12 May 2019, 10am-7pm	Bugis+

For the first time, augmented reality and virtual reality were used on a green screen during the acting segment in the auditions. The augmented reality versions were also heavily used during the grand finals, notably the title card before and after commercial cuts, as well as the NOOOICE! guest performance.

=== Marketing ===
Jean Yip Group was the only sponsor to return from the past season. New sponsors include Bee Cheng Hiang, Bonia, KFC, Mitsubishi Electric, Simmons and Win2 Crackers, who previously sponsored another reality competition SPOP Sing! last year, as well as Samsung Galaxy, Senka, PD Door, Poh Heng jewelry, official car Audi and travel agency website Trip.com.

=== Top 24 Meet and Greet ===
A meet-and-greet session was held on 21 July 2019 at Funan's The Base, with special guests and former contestants Zoe Tay, Vivian Lai, Yao Wenlong and Brandon Wong. A second session was held on both locations at Gardens by the Bay and Woodlands Temporary Bus Interchange on 10 August 2019. A third meet-and-greet session, which also officiated the launch of the Samsung Galaxy Note 10 in Singapore, was held on Plaza Singapura on 17 August 2019. A fourth meet-and-greet session was held at Bugis+ on 15 September 2019.

Another meet-and-greet session featuring the top 12 finalists and former contestants will be held 19 October at Wisma Atria.

=== Screen Debut short videos ===
A series of 24 one-minute video titled Screen Debut each featuring a contestant pairing with guidance trained by former Star Search contestants, was uploaded on Toggle and aired as commercials starting on 30 August 2019. Each video featured different approaches and stories, and how the finalists made their debut on its first role and showcasing their talents.

=== Prelude episodes ===
Two prelude episodes were uploaded on Toggle on 20 and 27 September, and televised on Channel 8 two days after. The first prelude episode focus highlights on the auditions on the first half and training sessions on the second half, including never-seen behind-the-scenes of production for Screen Debut videos. The second prelude episode features mentoring sessions by star mentors Chen Hanwei, Huang Biren and Christopher Lee; during the second half, in a format similar to The Voice and The X Factor, as well as the third Project Superstar season and its ninth season which also involved mentoring, the finalists selected his or her mentor he or she wants to work with if available, and the mentors, each with four contestants per gender, will mentor their respective contestants through the remainder of the season. Both episodes were also captioned in English subtitles.

=== The Journey special ===
A special clip show episode, titled The Journey, was uploaded on Toggle on 8 November, and broadcast on 10 November at 3.05pm, right before the re-run of the Finals. The clip show features the final 12 in their preparation for the finals, including their interviews along with their mentors and the judges about the competition and training throughout the season.

== Contestants ==
The 24 contestants was announced on 4 July 2019 in a live conference held at Gillman Barracks. On the second Prelude episode, 24 contestants were divided into three teams, with each team helmed by each mentor, who chose eight finalists (four per gender) to form a coaching team (the team names are respectively labeled in parentheses) of their own to mentor them. The final 24 finalists and their respective teams were confirmed as follows:

Key:

- – Winner
- – Runner-up
- – Third place
- – Top 12 finalists
- – Withdrew
- Recipient of Samsung Galaxy's Most Photogenic Breakthrough

Act	Age(s)	Occupation	Gender	Mentor/team	Semi-finals	Result
Zhang Zetong 张哲通	26	Assistant manager	Male	Christopher Alliance	2	Winner
Herman Keh 郭坤耀	23	Student/Part-time Model	Male	Christopher Alliance	1	Runner-up
Ye Jia Yun 叶佳昀	17	Student	Female	Hanwei Corps	1	Third place
Sheryl Ang 洪丽婷	20	Full-time Model	Female	Christopher Alliance	2	Finalist
Gini Chang 曾晓晴	24	Primary School Teacher	Female	Chrisopher Alliance	1	Finalist
Vanessa Ho 何鎂琪	19	Student	Female	Biren Family	1	Finalist
Kiki Lim 林昭婷	17	Student	Female	Biren Family	2	Finalist
Zane Lim 林子颖	22	Student/Part-time Model	Male	Biren Family	1	Finalist
Juin Teh 郑六月	29	Self-employed	Female	Hanwei Corps	1	Finalist
Tyler Ten 邓伟德	23	Student/Part-time Model	Male	Hanwei Corps	2	Finalist
Jernelle Oh 胡煜诗	25	Self-employed	Female	Hanwei Corps	1	Finalist
Zhai Siming 翟思铭	22	Student	Male	Biren Family	2	Finalist
Gail Borjiet 博乐	26	Full-time Model	Female	Christopher Alliance	1	Eliminated
Natasha Chandra 陈靖霞	21	Student	Female	Biren Family	1	Eliminated
Chin Yi Yang 陈昱仰	17	Student	Male	Hanwei Corps	1	Eliminated
Bryan Kok 郭奕鑫	18	Student	Male	Hanwei Corps	2	Eliminated
Lee Wenn Hon 李文康	24	University Graduate	Male	Biren Family	1	Eliminated
Kenneth Liew 廖志翔	20	Student	Male	Christopher Alliance	2	Eliminated
Joel Low 卢家伟	32	Theatre Actor	Male	Christopher Alliance	1	Eliminated
Christy Mai 麦芷琪	20	Student	Female	Hanwei Corps	2	Eliminated
Alyssa Peh 白苑芳	26	University Graduate	Female	Biren Family	2	Eliminated
Jared Soh 苏健凯	23	Student	Male	Hanwei Corps	1	Eliminated
Sunny Xu 徐佳訸	17	Student	Female	Christopher Alliance	2	Eliminated
Tan Hao Thian 陈浩天	17	Student	Male	Biren Family	1	Withdrew

== Semifinals ==
The live semifinals started on 6 October 2019 and 13 October 2019. Each week, twelve acts performed; six went through to the finals, and six were eliminated.

=== Week 1 (6 October) ===
Overseas Judges: Phoebe Huang, Bowie Lam, Man Shu-sam
Media Judges: Chong Liung Man, Dasmond Koh, Marcus Wee, Ryan Lai, Terence Lim, Chloe Neo, Ang Eng Tee, Connie Chen

Tan Hao Thian withdrew prior to the semi-finals for personal reasons.

==== Round 1 and 2: Dance Round and WeMovie Acting Segment ====
The Dance round, along with the introduction dance, carries a 10% weightage towards the overall score. Following the segment, the finalists portrayed dramas segments of WeMovie He is 21 (他21岁) with the order of performance from the dance round played for the corresponding episodes. The acting segment weighs 40% towards the overall score.

Team	Performance description		
Team	Order	Dance description	Acting description
Christopher Alliance	1	Performed a jazz-step dance to the instrumental version of "Feel It Still".	A university student Fong Chi-Wai was killed due to an overdose with sleeping pills. The coroner visited Fong's family and inquire the answers of Fong's death. (Cast: Chang Hio Cheng as Mei-Yi (Fong's older sister), Jeff Wang as the coroner, Herman Keh as Chi-Hao (Fong's younger brother), Joel Low as Bo-En (Fong's future in-law), Gail Borjiet as Jia-Jia (Fong's neighbor))
Hanwei Corps	2	Performed a K-pop rendition.	Continuing from the first episode, the coroner visited Fong's campus (taped at Singapore Polytechnic) and asked their friends of Fong to inquire about the cause of his death. (Cast: Jernelle Oh as Li-Ling (Fong's girlfriend), Jeff Wang as the coroner, Chin Yi Yang as Yi-Fan (Fong's best friend), Jared Soh as Ming-Jie (Fong's best friend), Juin Teh as Shuang (Fong's best friend))
Biren Family	3	Performed an instrumental version of Bruno Mars's "Treasure".	Continuing from the second episode, the coroner tried many ways to identify Fong's cause of death, using various evidences provided by eyewitness including an uploaded video. (Cast: Zane Lim as Song-Pin (reporter), Jeff Wang as the coroner, Natasha Chandra as Si-Ting (eyewitness), Vanessa Ho as Mei-Fang (eyewitness who uploaded the video), Tan Hao Thian as assistant (uncredited in video))

==== Round 3: Media Charisma ====
Media Charisma carries a 30% weightage towards the overall score. At the end of each segment, the show will reveal the act with a current higher score based on the preferences by the Media judges. The results are as follows:

Segment	Results (team)
Episode 1	Chang Hio Cheng (Christopher Alliance)
Episode 2	Chang Hio Cheng (Christopher Alliance)
Episode 3	Chang Hio Cheng (Christopher Alliance)

==== Round 4: Spontaneous Act ====
The fourth and final round, Spontaneous Act, carrying a 20% score, involve acts performing scenarios with a question given from the producers. Teams have one minute to discuss their order of performance, and each act had 25 seconds to present forth their answers.

Team	Name	Order	Question	Acting environment	Overall result
Christopher Alliance	Joel Low	1	My car broke down. You called me to help but it's no use. I know how to fix motorcycles, not vehicles!	Roadside	Eliminated
Hanwei Corps	Juin Teh	2	My car broke down. You called me to help but it's no use. I know how to fix motorcycles, not vehicles!	Mediacorp Campus	Advanced
Biren Family	Zane Lim	3	My car broke down. You called me to help but it's no use. I know how to fix motorcycles, not vehicles!	Durian Stall	Advanced
Hanwei Corps	Jared Soh	4	Have you taken your medicine? Why are you so disobedient? You must take your medicine regularly. Come, take it.	School Hall	Eliminated
Biren Family	Natasha Chandra	5	Have you taken your medicine? Why are you so disobedient? You must take your medicine regularly. Come, take it.	Office	Eliminated
Christopher Alliance	Herman Keh	6	Have you taken your medicine? Why are you so disobedient? You must take your medicine regularly. Come, take it.	Park	Advanced
Biren Family	Vanessa Ho	7	How are you feeling? I feel good... today's weather was good.	Night Store	Advanced
Christopher Alliance	Gail Borjiet	8	How are you feeling? I feel good... today's weather was good.	Streets	Eliminated
Hanwei Corps	Chin Yi Yang	9	How are you feeling? I feel good... today's weather was good.	Shopping Centre outside Singapore	Eliminated
Christopher Alliance	Chang Hio Cheng	10	Hey boss, are those black things on my mee siam burnt garlic? Does garlic have legs?	Home	Advanced
Hanwei Corps	Jernelle Oh	11	Hey boss, are those black things on my mee siam burnt garlic? Does garlic have legs?	Wardrobe Room	Advanced

=== Week 2 (13 October) ===
Overseas judges: Phoebe Huang, Bobby Au-yeung, Man Shu-sam
Media judges: Jeremy Tan, Mervin Wee, Irene Ang, Ryan Lai, Terence Lim, Connie Chen, Ang Eng Tee, Chong Liung Man

==== Round 1 and 2: Dance Round and WeMovie Acting Segment ====
Similar to Week 1, the 12 acts performed a dance and WeDrama Turning Chair (回转椅子) during the two segments, with the episode corresponding to the performance order during the dance round; both components weigh 10% and 40% towards the overall scores, respectively.

Team	Performance description		
Team	Order	Dance description	Acting description
Hanwei Corps	1	Performed a zumba street dance routine.	Fong Zhiwei sit on the chair from an antique shop to return in time to their barbecue party to prevent an accident that caused Jiajia's eye to be burnt, but the events transpired into another disaster where Zhiwei was involved in a car accident; later, Fong's friends visited the shop and discussed who would sit on the chair to change the events. (Cast: Tyler Ten as Fong Zhiwei, Florence Tan as the shopkeeper, Bryan Kok as Bo-en (Zhiwei's best friend), Christy Mai as Meiyi (Zhiwei's girlfriend), Ye Jia Yun as Jiajia (Meiyi's best friend))
Biren Family	2	Performed an electro step dance.	Lin Yifan and his wife Liling visited the antique shop to change the events of perpetrator over the car accident case (which occurred on the first episode) and her runaway, respectively. (Cast: Lee Wenn Hon as Lin Yifan, Florence Tan as the shopkeeper, Alyssa Peh as Liling (Yifan's wife), Zhai Si Ming as Ming-jie (Liling's brother), Kiki Lim as Shuang (Liling's sister), Priscelia Chan as the reporter)
Christopher Alliance	3	Performed a contemporary dance.	Songpin and Siting visited the antique shop to change the events of Meifen's suicide. However their truth of both Songpin and Siting were revealed along the way, including a planned marriage and a family reunion. (Cast: Florence Tan as the shopkeeper, Sunny Xu as Siting (shopkeeper's daughter), Teoh Ze Tong as Songpin (Meifen's boyfriend), Sheryl Ang as Meifen (Songpin's girlfriend), Kenneth Liew as Siyang (shopkeeper's son & Siting's brother))

==== Round 3: Media Charisma ====
Media Charisma carries a 30% weightage towards the overall score. The results for the Charisma was revealed after each segment of the Acting round. The results are as follows:

Segment	Results (team)
Episode 1	Christy Mai (Hanwei Corps)
Episode 2	Kiki Lim (Biren Family)
Episode 3	Sheryl Ang (Christopher Alliance)

==== Round 4: Spontaneous Act ====
The fourth and final round, Spontaneous Act, carrying a 20% score, involve acts performing scenarios with a question given from the producers. Teams have one minute to discuss their order of performance, and each act had 25 seconds to present forth their answers.

Team	Name	Order	Question	Acting environment	Overall result
Hanwei Corps	Tyler Ten	1	I've been meeting those weird people lately; am I that weird? I bet you're a weirdo too!	Toilet	Advanced
Biren Family	Lee Wenn Hon	2	I've been meeting those weird people lately; am I that weird? I bet you're a weirdo too!	Park	Eliminated
Christopher Alliance	Sunny Xu	3	I've been meeting those weird people lately; am I that weird? I bet you're a weirdo too!	Palace Grounds	Eliminated
Biren Family	Zhai Si Ming	4	Hello...? Who are you? Is that really you? Is what you are saying real?	Wet Market	Advanced
Christopher Alliance	Teoh Ze Tong	5	Hello...? Who are you? Is that really you? Is what you are saying real?	Mountain	Advanced
Hannwei Corps	Bryan Kok	6	Hello...? Who are you? Is that really you? Is what you are saying real?	Construction Site	Eliminated
Christopher Alliance	Sheryl Ang	7	We must not be selfish, we must help each other out!	Friend's house	Advanced
Hanwei Corps	Christy Mai	8	We must not be selfish, we must help each other out!	Mediacorp Campus	Eliminated
Biren Family	Kiki Lim	9	We must not be selfish, we must help each other out!	Office	Advanced
Hanwei Corps	Ye Jia Yun	10	I want a black coffee, exactly 96 °C just nice, or else it would burn!	Amusement Park	Advanced
Biren Family	Alyssa Peh	11	I want a black coffee, exactly 96 °C just nice, or else it would burn!	Hospital	Eliminated
Christopher Alliance	Kenneth Liew	12	I want a black coffee, exactly 96 °C just nice, or else it would burn!	Home	Eliminated

== Finals ==
The final performances took place on 3 November. During the end of the second semifinals, the hosts announced that the Samsung Galaxy's Most Photogenic Breakthrough Award (a cash prize of $10,000 and a trip to Seoul, South Korea) will be given out during the show, with the three mentors voting for the winner with the most improvements made throughout the season. The award went to Vanessa Ho of Team Huang Biren.
Guest judges: Doreen Neo, Stephen Fung, Simon Yam, Carina Lau, Man Shu-sam
Guest performers: Desmond Tan, Romeo Tan, Jeremy Chan, Jeffrey Xu, NOOOICE!

=== Round 1 & 2: X-Factor and Viral Dance segment ===
The X-Factor and Viral Dance segments carry 20% and 10% weightage towards the final scores respectively. The order is performed by the contestants for the respective genders.

Act		X-Factor		Viral Dance	
Team	Name	Order	Description	Order	Description
Hanwei Corps	Juin Teh	1	Performed a piano piece	13	Performed street dance "I Wanna Be A Celeb" by Celeb Five, a K-Pop group from South Korea.
Hanwei Corps	Jernelle Oh	2	Performed fencing	13	Performed street dance "I Wanna Be A Celeb" by Celeb Five, a K-Pop group from South Korea.
Hanwei Corps	Ye Jia Yun	3	Performed softball	13	Performed street dance "I Wanna Be A Celeb" by Celeb Five, a K-Pop group from South Korea.
Christopher Alliance	Chang Hio Cheng	4	Performed Chinese Fan Dancing	13	Performed street dance "I Wanna Be A Celeb" by Celeb Five, a K-Pop group from South Korea.
Christopher Alliance	Sheryl Ang	5	Performed stilt walking	13	Performed street dance "I Wanna Be A Celeb" by Celeb Five, a K-Pop group from South Korea.
Biren Family	Vanessa Ho	6	Performed DJ	13	Performed street dance "I Wanna Be A Celeb" by Celeb Five, a K-Pop group from South Korea.
Biren Family	Kiki Lim	7	Performed acoustic guitar	13	Performed street dance "I Wanna Be A Celeb" by Celeb Five, a K-Pop group from South Korea.
Hanwei Corps	Tyler Ten	8	Performed Muay Thai	14	Performed flash mob robot dance
Christopher Alliance	Herman Keh	9	Performed Street dancing	14	Performed flash mob robot dance
Christopher Alliance	Teoh Ze Tong	10	Performed vigorous exercises	14	Performed flash mob robot dance
Biren Family	Zane Lim	11	Performed soccer	14	Performed flash mob robot dance
Biren Family	Zhai Si Ming	12	Performed basketball	14	Performed flash mob robot dance

=== Round 3: Eloquence Round ===
This round carries 20% weightage towards the final score. For this round, mentors and their contestants ballot on questions issued by each celebrity (acting as respective characters in selected scenes). Contestants have 25 seconds to present their answers for the scenarios.

Act		Order	Eloquence question			
Team	Name	Order	Celebrity	Character	Question	Selected scene
Hanwei Corps	Ye Jia Yun	1	Qi Yuwu (narrated by Lee Teng)	Stephen Chow	It is the first day you are filming and an idol celebrity slapped you; would you be slapped or you slap back?	Star Search 1999
Hanwei Corps	Tyler Ten	2	Qi Yuwu (narrated by Lee Teng)	Gordon Lam	When you receive your award and while you are making an acceptance speech, what would you do if the microphone becomes faulty?	Star Awards 2011
Hanwei Corps	Jernelle Oh	3	Qi Yuwu (narrated by Lee Teng)	Tang Yaojia	When you fall in love with an actress from the same drama, would you publicly confess your romance?	C.L.I.F. 2
Hanwei Corps	Juin Teh	4	Qi Yuwu (narrated by Lee Teng)	Mona "Salah"	You have already figured out the truth, so would you spread the word to your friends?	N/A
Christopher Alliance	Chang Hio Cheng	5	Chen Hanwei (narrated by Kym Ng)	Chen's mother	Would you rather become a mother or go for acting career?	Star Search 1988
Christopher Alliance	Sheryl Ang	6	Chen Hanwei (narrated by Kym Ng)	A fan of Fang Ansheng	If you happened to see your idol slack off, would you pretend not to watch or go and watch?	Morning Express
Christopher Alliance	Herman Keh	7	Chen Hanwei (narrated by Kym Ng)	Bobo	If your rival keep spitting saliva at you, would you bear the grudge or inform someone?	The Best Things in Life
Christopher Alliance	Teoh Ze Tong	8	Chen Hanwei (narrated by Kym Ng)	Chen's black rose	If your friend request to borrow your lucky charm, would you do so?	Star Awards
Biren Family	Kiki Lim	9	Christopher Lee (narrated by Jeremy Chan	Yan Fei	How would you react if your zipper pants opens?	Star Search 1995
Biren Family	Zane Lim	10	Christopher Lee (narrated by Jeremy Chan	A condor	If you were given a choice, would you portray as a protagonist, an antagonist, or a condor?	The Return of the Condor Heroes
Biren Family	Zhai Si Ming	11	Christopher Lee (narrated by Jeremy Chan	A golden clock	If the presenter incorrectly announces your name and happens you are not the recipient of the award, how would you react from the gaffe?	Golden Bell Awards
Biren Family	Vanessa Ho	12	Christopher Lee (narrated by Jeremy Chan	Zed Lee	Should Zed Zed be listening to his father or mother's advice?	Zed Lee

=== Round 4: Acting Round ===
The fourth and final round carries a 50% score towards the final score. Contestants from each team will pair with a former Star Search finalist on a rendition of a previously aired Singaporean drama with a role played by the respective mentor.

Team	Order	Acting description		
Team	Order	Drama	Guest actor	Cast
Hanwei Corps	1	A Song to Remember	Desmond Tan	Tyler Ten as Xu Kun, Ye Jia Yun as Yu Hong, Juin Teh as Song Qiao-Er, Jernelle Oh as Liu Jiumei, Desmond Tan as Luo Xiaoxiao
Christopher Alliance	2	The Guest People	Jeffrey Xu	Chang Hio Cheng as Woo Jin-yan, Sheryl Ang as Loo Ju-Xiang, Herman Keh as Zhang Jing-hong, Jeffrey Xu as Sun Shi-zhong, Teoh Ze Tong as Zhang Zong-Zhi
Biren Family	3	My Lucky Charm	Romeo Tan	Kiki Lim as Lucky, Zhai Si Ming as Zhang Fenshou, Romeo Tan as Lim Tianming, Vanessa Ho as Fang Yingying, Zane Lim as Chen Jinfang

=== Overall result ===
Award	Result
Samsung Galaxy's Most Photogenic Breakthrough	Vanessa Ho (Biren Family)
Third place	Ye Jia Yun (Hanwei Corps)
Runner-up	Herman Keh (Christopher Alliance)
Winner	Zhang Zetong (Christopher Alliance)
