= The Silver Lining (TV series) =

- Genre: Drama
- Written by: Zhao Zhijian; Soh Choon Heng
- Starring: Lina Ng; Zheng Geping; Margaret Lee; Peter Yu; Chen Shucheng; Li Yinzhu; Zeng Sipei; Fu Youming; Anna Chen; Weng Ruiyun; Richard Low
- Theme music composer: Tan Kah Beng
- Country of origin: Singapore
- Original language: Mandarin
- No. of seasons: 1
- No. of episodes: 20

Production
- Producer: Lee Leng Kiong

Original release
- Network: Channel 8
- Release: April 17 – August 28, 1997

The Silver Lining (Chinese: 骤雨骄阳) is a Singaporean Chinese drama series. The series stars Lina Ng, Zheng Geping, Peter Yu, Margaret Lee, Pan Lingling, Chen Shucheng, Li Yinzhu, Zeng Sipei, Fu Youming, Anna Chen and Weng Ruiyun.

== Cast ==
- Lina Ng
- Zheng Geping
- Peter Yu
- Margaret Lee
- Pan Lingling
- Chen Shucheng
- Li Yinzhu
- Zeng Sipei
- Fu Youming
- Anna Chen
- Weng Ruiyun
- Richard Low

== Reception ==
The series received a positive review in the Lianhe Zaobao.
