= Margaret Lee (Singaporean actress) =

Singaporean actress

- Born: 24 May 1970 (age 55); Singapore
- Education: CHIJ St Joseph's Convent
- Occupation: Actress
- Years active: 1990−2009
- Spouse: unknown (m. 1993–1998)
- Awards: Star Search 1990 : 1st Runner Up & Most Photogenic

Chinese name
- Simplified Chinese: 李美玲
- Hanyu Pinyin: Lǐ Měilíng

Margaret Lee Mui Lin (born 24 May 1970) is a former Singaporean actress. Lee was a Mediacorp full-time actress from 1990 to 2000 and from 2003 to 2009.

== Career ==
=== Media ===
Lee entered the entertainment industry after placing second to Chew Chor Meng in the Star Search competition held in year 1990. Lee first appeared in an episode of the Singapore comedy serial Modern Romance as a vampish model. In 1992, she played a kind and caring nurse in Breaking Point, alongside critically acclaimed stars Li Nanxing and Huang Biren. In 1995, she starred in the television film To Madam With Love. In the following year, she starred in the television film The Night is Young.

Lee left Singapore Broadcasting Corporation (SBC) in 1998 after her contract ended.

After five years, Lee returned to Mediacorp in 2003. Her most notable role was in the drama Holland V (2003), where she played as an irresponsible mother who leaves her daughter in the care of the Mo family. She has also starred in a number of local movies, such as The Best Bet (2004) and I Do, I Do (2005) which were directed by Jack Neo. Lee was also managed by J-Team, headed by Neo.

Lee also starred in a local sitcom series known as Police & Thief from 2004 to 2008 in Seasons 1 to 5 before leaving the entertainment industry again to focus on her own business and personal life and she was then replaced by Sharon Wong in the final season being Season 6 in 2010. In July 2004, Lee appeared on the cover of FHM Singapore.

=== Other ===
After leaving SBC in 1998, Lee went into sales and insurance.

== Personal life ==
Lee was born in Hougang and is a Catholic. She speaks the Teochew dialect and attended CHIJ St Joseph's Convent.

She was married in 1993 and divorced in 1998.

== Filmography ==
=== Film ===
Year	Title	Role	Notes	Ref
1995	To Madam With Love (老师的情人)	Joey	Telemovie	
1996	The Night is Young (美丽夜女郎)	Wendy	Telemovie	
2004	The Best Bet	Susan		
2005	I Do, I Do			

=== Television series ===
Year	Title	Role	Notes	Ref
1991	Behind Bars 铁狱雷霆	May		
1991	Golden Shenton Way 金色珊顿道	Tang Shiliu		
1991	Black Phoenix 黑凤凰	Yang Yuanting		
1992	Modern Romance 男欢女爱	Linda		
1992	Breaking Point 暴风边缘	Ma Simin		
1992	Crazy Chase 富贵也疯狂	Chen Xiuzhu		
1992	Terms of Endearment 戏剧人生	Ma Qianyi		
1993	Angel of Vengeance 暴雨狂花	Chu Hong		
1993	The Brave One 荡寇英雄	Zhao Zifen		
1994	Bond of Love 情网	Luo Qingling		
1994	Thunder Plot 惊天大阴谋	Xie Xueli		
1994	Larceny of Love 雌雄大盗	Qiu Yu		
1994	Against All Odds 共闯荆途	Gu Xiyang		
1994	Love At Last 真心男儿	Song Anqi		
1996	Triumph Over The Green 爱拼球会赢	Long Fengzhu		
1996	Marriage, Dollars and Sense 5C老公	Hu Xiwen		
1997	The Silver Lining	Lin Xianping		
1997	Playing to Win Uncle当自强	Yang Baobao		
1997	Not The Facts – Twin Doubt 迷离剧场 之《永不停止的乐章》	Anne		
1998	Legend of the Crow 乌丫传说	Lan Xiang		
2000	On the Frontline 穿梭生死线	Nana		
2003	Holland V			
2005	My Lucky Charm			
2005	A New Life	Xiaoyan		
2004-2008	Police & Thief	Mrs Lily Lee		
