= Peter Yu =

Singaporean actor (born 1968)

- Born: 3 April 1968 (age 57); Singapore
- Other names: Yu Hongrong
- Occupation: Actor
- Years active: 1990–2000; 2004-2005; 2016−present
- Spouses: Quan Yi Fong (m. 1998; div. 2009) Brenda Leow (m. 2011)
- Children: 3, including Eleanor Lee

Stage name
- Traditional Chinese: 宏榮
- Simplified Chinese: 宏荣
- Hanyu Pinyin: Hóng Róng

Birth name
- Traditional Chinese: 俞宏榮
- Simplified Chinese: 俞宏荣
- Hanyu Pinyin: Yú Hóngróng

Peter Yu (born 3 April 1968) is a Singaporean actor. He was one of the finalists from the 1990 Star Search competition, organised by Mediacorp. Yu is known for his starring roles in many Channel 8 series in the 1990s, notably The Great Conspiracy (1993), Love At Last (1994), Tofu Street (1996), The Silver Lining (1997) and From The Medical Files series. In 2016, he played a supporting role in the drama series Hero, in which the character was reportedly partly based on his own life experiences. In 2018, Yu came to renewed attention with A Land Imagined, a critically well received Singaporean film which won the top prize at the Swiss Locarno International Film Festival. Since then, Yu has gone on to appear in a number of films and multiple Mediacorp productions.

== Personal life ==
Yu married follow MediaCorp actress Quan Yi Fong in 1998 after meeting while filming the television series Happy Travel Agency. They have a daughter, Eleanor Lee, born on 12 October 1999. Yu and Quan divorced on 3 January 2009 and share custody of their daughter. Quan shared she has forgiven Yu and they no longer have any animosity between them.

== Filmography ==
=== Television series ===
Year	English title	Mandarin title	Role	Notes
1991	Changing Fortunes	天赐奇才		
1993	The Wilful Siblings	斗气姐妹		
1993	The Great Conspiracy	莲花争霸	Kong Xiaowu	
1994	Challenge of Truth	铁证柔情	Ah Sheng	
1994	Love At Last	真心男儿	Liang Zheng Li (Ah Li)	
1994	Against All Odds	共闯荆途		
1994	Scorned Angel	冷太阳		
1996	My Destiny With You	缘来是你	Lan Tian	
1996	Tofu Street	豆腐街	Song Yizhe / Ah Ming	
1997	The Silver Lining	骤雨骄阳		
1997	My Wife, Your Wife, Their Wives	101老婆		Episode 6
1997	From The Medical Files	医生档案		
1998	Office Affairs	哈比旅行社		
1998	Men At Crossroads	四个好色的男人		
1998	Around People’s Park	珍珠街坊	Liu Jin Long	
1999	My Teacher, My Friend	小岛醒了	Huang Dao Sheng	
1999	From The Medical Files II	医生档案 II		
2000	Knotty Liaison	爱情百科		
2005	Yummy Yummy	—N/a		
2016	Hero	大英雄	Luo Bei	
2017	Dream Coder	梦想程式	Ouyang Fan	
2019	A World Of Difference	都市狂想		Episodes 3-4
2019	Fried Rice Paradise	—N/a		
2019	128 Circle	—N/a	Ah Tian	
2020	My Guardian Angels	Xie Zhihong	Episode 1	
2020	How Are You? 2	好世谋2	Zhu Dachang	
2020	Love, Enabled	—N/a	Teck	Episode 3: "Stay with Me"
2020	Brudderhood	—N/a		
2021	A Father's Love	—N/a		
2021	Reunion	—N/a		
2022	After Dark	—N/a		Season 2
2023	Fix My Life	整你的人生	Liu Shirong	
2023	Cash on Delivery	送餐英雄	Qiu Tian	
2023	All That Glitters	金色大道	Stall owner	Special appearance
2023	Deep End	深网	Tan Shijie	

=== Film ===
Year	Title	Role	Notes	Ref
1995	Sea Eagle (海岸猎鹰土)		Telemovie	
1995	Somewhere In Time (再世情缘)	Zonghua	Telemovie	
1996	The Web (网络杀人事件)		Telemovie	
2017	Benjamin's Last Day at Katong Swimming Complex	Older Coach	Short film	
2018	A Land Imagined (幻土)	Lok		
2018	The Crematorium Man	Wen	Short film	
2018	Run Chicken Run	Father	Short film	
2021	Dreaming		Short film	
2021	Time Flows in Strange Ways on Sundays (依依)		Short film	
2023	Circle Line (生死环线)	Bo Seng		
2023	Where Are You Going? (请问你要去哪里？)	Fa	Short film	
2023	Seven Days (七天)	Father		
2023	Dreaming & Dying (好久不见)			
2023	Snow in Midsummer (五月雪)	Kooi		
2023	Last Shadow at First Light	Ami's father		
2023	Wonderland (乐园)	Tan		
2023	A Year of No Significance (大风吹)	Lim Cheng Soon		
2026	A Singapore Dementia Story (Another Go)	Leon Lim		

== Theatre ==
Year	Title	Notes
2014	Window in the Sky	A Bartley Christian Church production

== Awards and nominations ==
Year	Award	Category	Nominated work	Result	Ref
1995	Star Awards	Top 10 Most Popular Male Artistes	—N/a	Nominated	
1996	Star Awards	Top 10 Most Popular Male Artistes	—N/a	Nominated	
1997	Star Awards	Top 10 Most Popular Male Artistes	—N/a	Won	
1998	Star Awards	Top 10 Most Popular Male Artistes	—N/a	Nominated	
2018	Canberra Short Film Festival	Best Actor (international)	The Crematorium Man	Won	
2024	Ho Chi Minh International Film Festival	Best Supporting Actor	Wonderland	Won	
2024	Star Awards	Best Supporting Actor	Cash on Delivery	Nominated	
