= The Sky Is Still Blue =

2023 Singaporean television series

- Promotional banner
- Traditional Chinese: 從零開始
- Simplified Chinese: 从零开始
- Literal meaning: "Start From Scratch"
- Hanyu Pinyin: Cóng líng kāishǐ
- Genre: Drama
- Screenplay by: Peng Kaiyi
- Story by: Xie Junyuan; Wu Cuicui
- Directed by: Poh Ya Xin; Lee Jia Wei; Wong Kuang Yong
- Starring: Ferlyn Wong; James Seah; Sheryl Ang; Zong Zijie; Desmond Ng
- Opening theme: "Da Po Guan Li" by Lin Si Tong
- Ending theme: "Kan Ke" by Yang Min; "Out in the Rain" by Chen Yu Xuan
- Country of origin: Singapore
- Original language: Mandarin
- No. of seasons: 1
- No. of episodes: 20

Production
- Executive producer: Wong Kuang Yong
- Cinematography: Huang Minghui; Mao Zhenbang
- Editors: Zhang Bifang; Li Minghui
- Running time: 45 minutes
- Production company: Mediacorp

Original release
- Network: Channel 8
- Release: 10 July – 4 August 2023

The Sky is Still Blue (Chinese: 从零开始) is a 2023 Singaporean drama series starring Ferlyn Wong, James Seah, Sheryl Ang, Zong Zijie and Desmond Ng. It revolves around Junlin, the daughter of a tech firm CEO, who gathers her friends to set up the company and support group "HTB" to help bankrupts to start anew. It airs every Mondays to Fridays on Mediacorp Channel 8 at 9pm, starting from 10 July 2023.

== Cast ==
- Ferlyn Wong as Liang Junlin
  - Xie Zhixuan as young Junlin
- James Seah as Wu Huoyao
- Sheryl Ang as Chen Yu-an
- Zong Zijie as Li Weidong
- Desmond Ng as Wang Yuan
- Jernelle Oh as Tang Xiuya
- Darren Lim as Liang Qingtian
- Chen Liping as Hong Aixi
- Wang Yuqing as Henry
- Bonnie Loo as Babyanne
- Pan Lingling as Joanne Xie Shuhui
- Zhang Xinxiang as Tang Yongnian
- Adele Wong as Elaine
- Hong Guorui as Uncle Fong
- Juin Teh as Le Qi
- Charlie Goh as Dr. Loh
- Wallace Ang as Zhou Zhiqiang
- Eelyn Kok as Song Lifen
- Marcus Chin as Uncle Ben
- Adam Chen as Jack
- Ben Yeo as Liu Zhongye
- Alice Ho as Shan's mother
- Yao Wenlong as Robert

== Awards and nominations ==
Accolades	Category	Nominees	Result
Star Awards 2024	Best Supporting Actress	Chen Liping	Nominated
