= Ayden Sng =

Singaporean actor

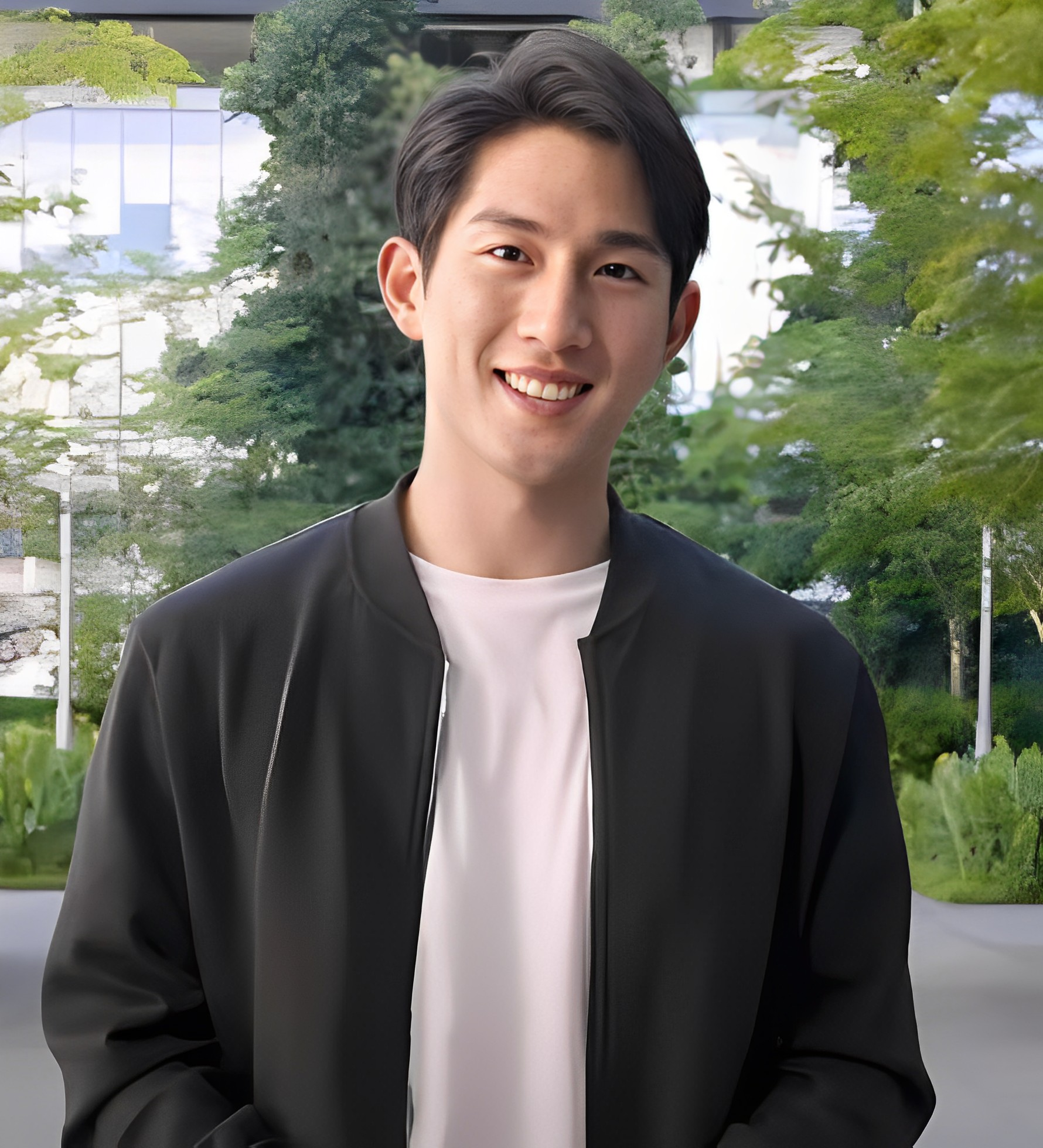
- Sng in July 2021
- Born: Sng Zheng; Singapore
- Education: Raffles Institution
- Alma mater: Trinity College of Arts and Sciences (Duke University)
- Occupations: Actor; host; musician
- Years active: 2019−present
- Musical career
- Genres: Classical; Chinese classical
- Instruments: Violin; piano; erhu
- Formerly of: Singapore National Youth Chinese Orchestra

Chinese name
- Traditional Chinese: 孫政
- Simplified Chinese: 孙政
- Hanyu Pinyin: Sūn Zhèng

Ayden Sng Zheng is a Singaporean actor, host and musician, best known for starring in the television series Loving You, Truths About Us, The Unbreakable Bond and All That Glitters.

== Early life and career ==
Sng attended Raffles Institution and graduated from Duke University, where he majored in International Comparative Studies and was a member of the Lambda Phi Epsilon Fraternity. He was a Commando when serving National Service (NS). He worked as a product manager in a consulting firm where his pay was reportedly more than $6,000 a month, before he became a full-time Mediacorp artiste in May 2019. In June 2021, Sng revealed that he had renewed his contract with the TV station.

In September 2023, Sng was one of the actors chosen for the Mediacorp–Huanyu Entertainment partnership, where the Chinese talent management company will represent him in China.

In April 2024, Sng was cast in the Chinese fantasy drama Feud, starring Bai Lu and Joseph Zeng as its main leads.

In 2025, Sng won his third consecutive Star Awards for Most Popular Rising Stars.

== Personal life ==
Sng plays the violin, piano, and erhu. He is also a former member of the Singapore National Youth Orchestra, and is a host of their online programme Music Chatterbox.

Sng took the Mensa test when he was in primary school and was admitted to the organisation where members are tested to have an IQ of above 130.

Sng named American business magnate Elon Musk as one of the people he idolises the most.

In February 2023, Sng and his fanclub, "The Baeden Club", raised more than $1,800 for the victims of the Turkey–Syria earthquake. The donations were later handed to the Singapore Red Cross Society.

== Filmography ==
=== Television series ===
Year	Title	Role	Notes	Ref.
2019	Walk with Me 谢谢你出现在我行程里	Junwei		
2019	My Agent Is a Hero 流氓经纪	Xiong	Season 2	
2019	Old Is Gold 老友万岁	Sean Tan		
2019	Wonder Kiss 神奇之吻	Great grandfather (young)		
2019	The Wedding Survival Handbook	Darren Lee		
2020	Recipe of Life 味之道	Lin Chaowei		
2020	Remember To Forget 别忘记他	Yao Zhekai	Fresh Takes! season 2	
2020	Loving You 爱...没有距离	Dong Sheng		
2021	Truths About Us 别来无恙	Ryan		
2021	Leave No Soul Behind 21点灵	Javier Lee		
2022	The Unbreakable Bond 寄生	Gu Yuncong		
2023	Strike Gold	Jiang Wenhao		
2023	Silent Walls	Liang Wenhui		
2023	All That Glitters	He Jianzhi		
2025	Feud	Long Yuan		
2026	Double Helix 双程	Lu Feng		
TBA	Hungry Souls: From Hell, With Love 味尽缘			

=== Films ===
Year	Title	Role	Notes	Ref.
2019	The Play Book 爱本	Zhang Yuheng	Short film	
2023	Seven Days	Aixiang		

=== Variety Shows ===
Year	Title	Notes	Ref.
2019	Thumbs Up Senior 学长学姐好样的！	Guest	
2020	Frontline Connects 前线开讲	Season 1 (guest)	
2021−present	Music Chatterbox 音乐话匣子	Web programme (host)	
2021	Frontline Connects 前线开讲	Season 2 (guest)	
2021	Towkay, Take a Break 街坊请关照	Ep 4: "Tailor Shop" (guest)	
2022	Abyss of Greed 贪婪深渊	Host	
2022	Dishing with Chris Lee 阿顺有煮意	Guest	
2023	Forbidding No More 极境之旅	Season 2: Jordan (Ep 3) & Faroe Islands (Ep 7) (host)	
2023	Fashion Refabbed 衣衣不舍	Ep 8: Ayden Sng & Carrie Wong(guests)	

== Awards and nominations ==
Organisation	Year	Category	Nominated work	Result	Ref.
Star Awards	2023	Best Actor	The Unbreakable Bond	Nominated	
Star Awards	2023	Most Popular Rising Stars	—N/a	Won	
Star Awards	2023	Bioskin Most Charismatic Artiste	—N/a	Won	
Star Awards	2023	Chan Brothers My Star Guide Award	—N/a	Won	
Star Awards	2024	The Show Stealer	All That Glitters (as He Jianzhi)	Won	
Star Awards	2024	Most Popular Rising Stars	—N/a	Won	
Star Awards	2025	Most Popular Rising Stars	—N/a	Won	
