= Wonderland (2023 film) =

2023 Singaporean film

- Traditional Chinese: 樂園
- Simplified Chinese: 乐园
- Hanyu Pinyin: Lè Yuán
- Directed by: Chai Yee Wei
- Written by: Michelle Chang
- Produced by: Michelle Chang
- Starring: Mark Lee; Peter Yu; Xenia Tan
- Production companies: Mocha Chai Laboratories; mm2 Entertainment
- Release date: 8 November 2023
- Running time: 125 minutes
- Country: Singapore
- Languages: Mandarin; Hokkien; English

Wonderland (Chinese: 乐园) is a 2023 Singaporean drama film directed by Chai Yee Wei. It stars Mark Lee, Peter Yu and Xenia Tan. It had its world premiere at the 24th San Diego Asian Film Festival on 8 November 2023.

== Synopsis ==
Set in 1980s Singapore, the film revolves around reserved and illiterate single father Loke (Mark Lee), Loke's only daughter Eileen (Xenia Tan) and Loke's friendly neighbour Tan (Peter Yu) who helps Loke to write letters to Eileen (Xenia Tan) who is studying in New York. Loke has lied to Eileen and tells her that he can afford her overseas education. When Tan receives bad news from abroad, he is unable to tell Loke the truth. Tan decides to lie to Loke, hoping to find a better time to break the truth. However, Tan's web of lies soon spirals out of control.

== Cast ==
- Mark Lee as Loke
- Peter Yu as Tan
- Xenia Tan as Eileen

== Production ==
Formerly titled as The Last Letters (写给爸爸的信), Wonderland is the feature film screenwriting debut of Michelle Chang. The film is supported by the Singapore Film Commission and is jointly produced by Mocha Chai Laboratories and mm2 Entertainment. Principal photography began in Singapore in February 2023, before moving to Johor Bahru, Malaysia for the amusement park scenes. Some of the scenes were shot in New York, United States in early April 2023.

== Awards ==
2023 San Diego Asian film festival - Audience Award

- 2024 Palm Springs International Film Festival – Local Jury Award
- 2024 Ho Chi Minh International Film Festival - Best Actor Award for Mark Lee
- 2024 Ho Chi Minh International Film Festival - Best Supporting Actor Award for Peter Yu
