= Gini Chang =

Macanese actress and host (born 1994)

- Born: 3 October 1994 (age 32); Macau
- Other name: Zeng Xiaoqing
- Education: Education University of Hong Kong
- Occupations: Actress; television host; former primary school teacher
- Years active: 2019−present
- Musical career
- Member of: 4567

Chinese name
- Traditional Chinese: 曾曉晴
- Simplified Chinese: 曾晓晴
- Hanyu Pinyin: Zéng Xiǎoqíng

Gini Chang Hio Cheng (born 3 October 1994) is a Singapore-based Macanese actress and television host.

== Early life and education ==
Born in Macau, Chang obtained her degree in Master of Teaching from the Education University of Hong Kong. At age 17, she discovered her love for performing when she was cast in a wemovie promo trailer. Chang left her primary school teacher position and moved to Singapore after being scouted on the streets for Star Search 2019.

== Career ==
In the Star Search competition, Chang was a finalist and later made her acting debut in the drama series All Around You.

In 2021, Mediacorp's artiste management arm The Celebrity Agency roped in Chang, Jernelle Oh, Juin Teh and Seow Sin Nee to form the group "4567".

In 2022, Chang was cast in the 130-episode long-form medical series Healing Heroes, where she played a young aspiring doctor.

She has been a regular host of #JustSwipeLah and matinee lifestyle show Silver Carnival since 2021 and 2022, respectively.

In 2026, Chang and Tiffany Ho launched a Cantonese podcast/variety show titled NG Classroom on the YouTube channel "Beyond Gini".

== Filmography ==
=== Television series ===
Year	Title	Role	Notes	Ref.
2019	All Around You (回路网)	Ma Siyu		
2020	Super Dad (男神不败)	Chen Yuxin		
2021	My Star Bride	Ouyang Shanshan (Mai Phuong Nhi / Mei Fangni)		
2021	I Want To Be a Towkay (亲家冤家做头家)	Loria Chui		
2021	Mr Zhou's Ghost Stories@Job Haunting	Woman		
2022	Healing Heroes (医生不是神)	Yige		
2022	Love Unbound (爱不止息)	Kelly	Episode 3: "Far Apart but Close at Heart"	
2023	Last Madame: Sisters of the Night	Nozomi (young Ah Yoke)		
2024	If Tomorrow Comes (再见明天)	Chloe Luo		
2025	Emerald Hill - The Little Nyonya Story	Ah Zhen		

=== Film ===
Year	Title	Role	Notes	Ref.
2024	King of Hawkers	李晨贝 CP		

=== Hosting ===
Year	Title	Notes	Ref.
2021–present	#JustSwipeLah (刷一刷)	Web series	
2022	Dad, I've Got Your Back (爸比，我挺你)		
2022–present	Silver Carnival (银色嘉年华)		
2023	4567 JB Makan Lobang	Web series	

=== Podcast ===
Year	Title	Notes	Ref.
2021–present	NG Classroom	Hosted with Tiffany Ho	

== Discography ==
=== Compilation albums ===
Year	English title	Mandarin title
2022	MediaCorp Music Lunar New Year Album 22	新传媒群星旺虎泰哥迎春乐

== Awards and nominations ==
Organisation	Year	Category	Nominated work	Result	Ref.
Asia Contents Awards & Global OTT Awards	2023	Best Newcomer Actress	Last Madame: Sisters of the Night	Nominated	
New York Festivals TV and Film Awards	2024	Best Performance By An Actress	Last Madame: Sisters of the Night	Finalist	
Asian Art Film Awards	2025	Best Actress	King of Hawkers	Nominated	
Star Awards	2023	Most Popular Rising Stars	—N/a	Nominated	
Star Awards	2023	Favourite Onscreen Couple (Drama)	Healing Heroes	Nominated	
Star Awards	2024	Top 3 Most Popular Rising Stars	—N/a	Nominated	
Star Awards	2025	Top 3 Most Popular Rising Stars	—N/a	Nominated	
