= Double Helix (TV series) =

2026 Chinese-Singaporean television series

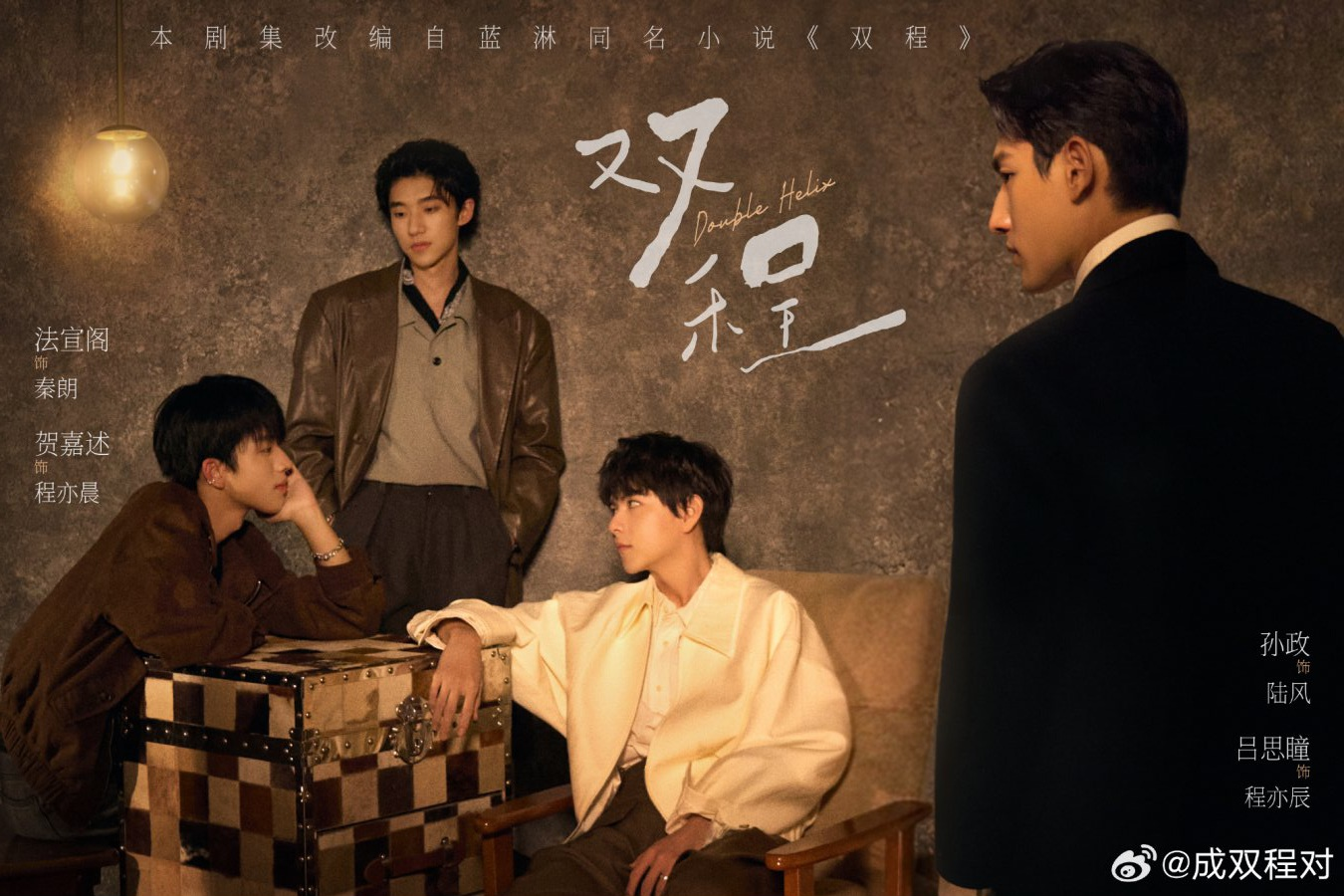
- Chinese: 双程
- Literally: Double Helix
- Genre: Romantic drama; Boys' love (BL)
- Based on: A Round Trip to Love (双程系列) by Lan Lin (蓝淋)
- Starring: Ayden Sng (孙政); Elio Lyu Sitong (吕思瞳)
- Countries of origin: China; Singapore
- Original language: Mandarin
- No. of seasons: 1
- No. of episodes: 12

Production
- Running time: 30–40 minutes

Original release
- Network: GagaOOLala; Viki; YouTube
- Release: 8 May – 13 June 2026

Double Helix (Chinese: 双程; pinyin: Shuāng Chéng) is a 2026 Chinese-Singaporean television series in the romantic drama and boys' love (BL) genres, starring Ayden Sng (孙政) and Elio Lyu Sitong (吕思瞳). The series is an adaptation of the novel A Round Trip to Love (双程系列) by Chinese author Lan Lin (蓝淋).

The series premiered on 8 May 2026, with new episodes released weekly, and ended on 13 June 2026. It is available worldwide (except Japan and South Korea) on GagaOOLala, Viki, YouTube and Viu.

== Synopsis ==
The story follows Cheng Yichen (Lyu Sitong), a model student, and Lu Feng (Ayden Sng), a rebellious heir, who fall in love during high school. When a classmate spreads a photo of them together, their relationship is discovered and they are forced apart under pressure from their families and school. Lu Feng is sent abroad, while Yichen has to change schools and rebuild his life alone.

Years later, they unexpectedly reunite when Lu Feng becomes Yichen's boss at the company. Although the attraction between them is immediately rekindled, the two once again face family disapproval and tragedies. The series follows their struggle to overcome obstacles and stay together.

== Cast and characters ==
=== Main ===
- Ayden Sng (孙政) as Lu Feng (陆风)
- Lyu Sitong (吕思瞳) as Cheng Yichen (程亦辰)

=== Recurring ===
- Fa Xuange (法宣阁)
- He Jiashu (贺嘉述)
- Li Keyi (李柯熠)
- Yang Kexin (杨可欣)
- Miao Jing'ou (妙静鸥)
- Qiu Ziyi (仇梓屹)
- Long Jiayu (龙嘉誉)

== Production ==
The series is based on the novel A Round Trip to Love (双程系列) by Chinese BL fiction author Lan Lin (蓝淋). The novel had previously been adapted into a film in 2016.

Singaporean actor Ayden Sng was cast as Lu Feng, marking his debut in a BL drama and his first leading role in the Chinese market. In April 2026, it was announced that Sng had signed a contract with Chinese agency Mejoy Entertainment to manage his career in the country. Shortly before the premiere, in May 2026, Sng hosted his co-star Lyu Sitong in Singapore, where the two went sightseeing together, generating anticipation among fans. An official trailer for the series was released on the KUKAN Drama Channel on YouTube.

== Release ==
The first two episodes of Double Helix were released on 8 May 2026. The first episode was made available for free on GagaOOLala, while the second required a VIP subscription. The series is also available on Viki, YouTube and Viu
