= Zhang Zetong =

Malaysian actor

- Born: Teoh Ze Tong; Johor Bahru, Malaysia
- Education: Anglo-Chinese Junior College; National University of Singapore
- Occupations: Actor; host
- Years active: 2019–present
- Agent: The Celebrity Agency
- Awards: Best Newcomer – Star Awards; 2021; Best Supporting Actor – Star Awards; 2024

Chinese name
- Simplified Chinese: 张哲通

Zhang Zetong (born Teoh Ze Tong) is a Malaysian actor and host based in Singapore. He is the winner of Star Search 2019. He won the Best Newcomer award in Star Awards 2021 and Best Supporting Actor award in the Star Awards 2024 for his roles in A Jungle Survivor and All That Glitters respectively.

== Early life ==
Zhang attended Anglo-Chinese Junior College and graduated from the National University of Singapore with a degree in Business Administration.

He previously worked at online marketplace platform Carousell and software development company Junyo. Zhang professed that he "stumbled into the media industry because of a talent competition and had to put the dreams of starting the next tech startup on hold" and also "to allow [him] to take a detour here because [he is] sure all the dots will connect in the future."

== Career ==
Zhang participated in Star Search 2019 of Mediacorp and won the contest as the champion. He was signed on by The Celebrity Agency (TCA) of Mediacorp after winning the contest. His debut work was All Around You as the lead actor. Zhang won his first award, Best Newcomer Award at Star Awards 2021, for his role in the drama, A Jungle Survivor.

In 2019, Zhang participated in Mediacorp Star Search and chose Christopher Lee as mentor. He eventually won the contest as the 1st-place winner and champion.

In 2020, Zhang made his television debut in meWATCH online series drama All Around You by playing a male lead role namely Chen Shiyang and a supporting role namely Zhong Jianting in Mediacorp Channel 8 drama A Jungle Survivor. He also partnered his former mentor, Christopher Lee to host a programme Aus-some Getaway.

In 2021, Zhang also crossed over to play supporting role in Mediacorp Channel 5 drama Slow Dancing as Kaden Leung. He also later played supporting roles in Mediacorp Channel 8 dramas namely Key Witness as Nick Zhu Jingxiang and The Take Down as Lin Jincheng. He was nominated and went on to win the Best Newcomer Award for his work in A Jungle Survivor as Zhong Jianting in Star Awards 2021.

In 2022, Zhang played the male lead role for second time as Mei Yishi in the fourth season of Mediacorp Channel 8 drama You Can Be An Angel namely You Can Be An Angel 4, replacing several actors who were more senior when they took on the male lead roles in three previous seasons and although he never took part in previous seasons. He also played the roles of Zhang Zhendong, Jason and Aden in meWATCH drama First of April directed by fellow artiste Zheng Geping. He was also nominated for the Best Supporting Actor Award for his work in Key Witness as Nick Zhu Jingxiang, Most Attention Seeking New-Gen Host Award for his work in JustSwipeLah as well as Bioskin Most Charismatic Artiste Award in Star Awards 2022. However, he was defeated in all three nominations. Later in the same year and in earlier 2023, he played the role of Zhong Haonan in his first long-form drama Healing Heroes.

In 2023, he played the role of Ah Tou in the drama Last Madame: Sisters of the Night and the role of Richard Mo in the drama All That Glitters in addition to Healing Heroes. He was also nominated as the Top 3 Most Popular Rising Stars but did not win in the nomination in Star Awards 2023.

In 2024, Zhang played the role of Liu Langhan, a person from the future year of 2060 in the Chinese New Year drama Once Upon A New Year's Eve and Cheng Changfeng in the parasports drama Hope Afloat.

In 2025, Zhang played the role of Huang Zu Ye in Emerald Hill - The Little Nyonya Story.

== Filmography ==
=== Television series ===
Year	Title	Role	Notes	Ref.
2020	All Around You (回路网)	Chen Shiyang		
2020	A Jungle Survivor (森林生存记)	Zhong Jianting		
2021	Slow Dancing	Kaden Leung		
2021	Key Witness (关键证人)	Nick Zhu Jingxiang		
2021	The Take Down (肃战肃绝)	Lin Jincheng		
2022	You Can Be An Angel 4 (你也可以是天使 4)	Mei Yishi		
2022	First of April (愚人计划)	Zhang Zhendong / Jason / Aden		
2022	Healing Heroes (医生不是神)	Zhong Haonan		
2023	Last Madame: Sisters of the Night	Ah Tou		
2023	All That Glitters	Richard Mo		
2024	Once Upon a New Year's Eve (那一年的除夕夜)	Liu Langhan		
2024	Hope Afloat (浴水重生）	Cheng Changfeng		
2025	Emerald Hill - The Little Nyonya Story	Huang Zuye		
2025	Perfectly Imperfect (活出好命来）	Lu Yiming		
2026	No Other Way (至死不渝）	Victor Thia		

=== Variety show hosting ===
Year	Title	Notes	Ref.
2020	Aus-some Getaway (与你澳游)	Co-hosted with Christopher Lee (Singaporean actor), Sheryl_Ang	

== Discography ==
=== Compilation albums ===
Year	Album title	Song title	Notes	Ref
2021	MediaCorp's Lunar New Year Album; The Year of Ox Happy MooMoo (福满牛年MOOMOO乐)	"新年到"		

== Awards and nominations ==
Organisation	Year	Category	Nominated work	Result	Ref
Star Awards	2021	Best Newcomer	A Jungle Survivor	Won	
Star Awards	2022	Best Supporting Actor	Key Witness	Nominated	
Star Awards	2022	Bioskin Most Charismatic Artiste Award	—N/a	Nominated	
Star Awards	2022	Most Attention Seeking New-Gen Host	JustSwipeLah	Nominated	
Star Awards	2023	Top 3 Most Popular Rising Stars	—N/a	Nominated	
Star Awards	2024	Best Supporting Actor	All That Glitters	Won	
Star Awards	2024	Most Hated Villain	All That Glitters	Won	
Star Awards	2024	Top 3 Most Popular Rising Stars	—N/a	Won	
Star Awards	2025	Top 3 Most Popular Rising Stars	—N/a	Won	
Star Awards	2026	Best Supporting Actor	Emerald Hill - The Little Nyonya Story	Nominated	
Star Awards	2026	Top 3 Most Popular Rising Stars	—N/a	Won	
Star Awards	2026	Favourite CP	Emerald Hill - The Little Nyonya Story	Won (Note: Shared with Tasha Low)	
