= Star Search (Singaporean TV series) season 9 =

Star Search
- Season 9
- Winner: Andie Chen
- Runner-up: Jerry Yeo

Release
- Original network: MediaCorp

Season chronology
- ← Previous; Season 8 Next → Season 10

Star Search 2007 is the 9th installment of Star Search. It marked the return of the talent-search program. From May 2007, Star Search 2007 travelled to China, Taiwan, Malaysia and Singapore in its search for new talents.

== Auditions ==
Eager to be the next big thing, 1,500 people flocked to the auditions. Talent cuts across geographical boundaries and, as such, there is no restriction on the number to be shortlisted for each region. The numbers are broken down this way:

Country	No. of applicants
Shanghai	200
Malaysia	300
Singapore	800
Taiwan	200

== Format ==
Two contestants will be removed from the talent quest each week, with no chance of a revival.
There will be four weeks of preliminary rounds, two weeks of quarter finals; one week of semi-final and grand final each.

== Contestant information ==
Index	Name	Chinese name	Country	Date Of Elimination	Status
F1	Yap Wei Chee Tracy	叶惠慈	Malaysia, Kuala Lumpur	28 August 2007	Eliminated
F2	Pan Hung Hsi Celia	潘虹熹	Taipei, Taiwan	4 November 2007	2nd Runner-up
F3	Zhou Ying	周颖	China, Shanghai	25 September 2007	Eliminated
F4	Pan Pei Yun Priscilla	潘姵澐	Singapore	28 August 2007	Eliminated
F5	Goh Hwee Li Jeneen	吴惠丽	Singapore	21 October 2007	Eliminated
F6	Lin Peiqi Angel	林佩琪	China, Shanghai	11 September 2007	Eliminated
F7	Ya Hui	雅慧	Singapore	4 November 2007	Runner-up Ms Telegenic
F8	Tracy Lee	李美玲	Malaysia, Kuala Lumpur	21 October 2007	Eliminated
F9	Leow Yin Ning Jvnne	廖尹宁	Singapore	11 September 2007	Eliminated
F10	Neo Wei Zhi Iren	梁溦芝	Singapore	2 October 2007	Eliminated
M1	Chang Hao Yi	张昊艺	Taipei, Taiwan	25 September 2007	Eliminated
M2	Chang Kay Yong Marcus	张家荣	Singapore	4 September 2007	Eliminated
M3	Huan Kuan Chieh Reeve	黄冠捷	Taipei, Taiwan	4 September 2007	Eliminated
M4	Jerry Yeo	杨伟烈	Singapore	4 November 2007	1st Runner-up Most Popular
M5	Andie Chen	陈邦鋆	Singapore	-	CHAMPION
M6	Desmond Tan	陈泂江	Singapore	4 November 2007	Runner-up
M7	Chang Hao Ying	张昊颖	Taipei, Taiwan	2 October 2007	Eliminated
M8	Tan Sia Chong Jackson	陈侠中	Singapore	4 November 2007	Runner-up Mr Personality
M9	Lin Kelun	林克伦	Singapore	18 September 2007	Eliminated
M10	Khor Jia Young Raynard	许嘉洋	Malaysia, Penang	18 September 2007	Eliminated

== Contestant mentors ==
Another new element this year is the introduction of MediaCorp artistes as mentors to the contestants. The responsibility of the artistes is to teach and they are also required to showcase the best qualities of their charges to the judges and audience.

Mentor	Female Contestant	Male Contestant
Chen Hanwei	F5 吴惠丽	M6 Desmond Tan
Edmund Chen	F1 叶惠慈	M9 林克伦
Huang Wenyong	F8 Tracy Lee	M8 陈侠中
Rayson Tan	F4 潘姵澐	M7 张昊颖
Tay Ping Hui	F2 潘虹熹	M4 Jerry Yeo
Zheng Geping	F9 廖尹宁	M5 Andie Chen
Chen Liping	F7 许雅慧	M1 张昊艺
Hong Huifang	F6 林佩琪	M3 黄冠捷
Huang Biren	F3 Zhou Ying	M10 许嘉洋
Ivy Lee	F10 梁溦芝	M2 张家荣

== Judges ==
In this 9th installment, the judging panel which will be made up of professionals from the industry. Moreover, this year the judges will have a 100% say over the eventual winners.

Judges	Description
Kok Len Shoong	Senior Vice President (Chinese Drama Productions)
郎祖筠; Liang Zhuyun	Taiwanese television/screen/stage actress-host
Alex Man (Resigned on 25 September)	Golden Horse Best Actor Award winner and veteran Hong Kong actor
Alfred Cheung	A Hong Kong actor/director who has been in the entertainment industry since 1980
Royston Tan	Singaporean filmmaker

== Judging criteria ==
Retaining its original format of a large-scale talent-search program, Star Search 2007 will incorporate new elements.

Quarter Finals
Round	Judging Criteria	Description
Imaging	25%	
Talent Performances	25%	
Acting Skills	50%	
Semi Finals
Singing; Dancing; Imaging	30%	
Q & A	20%	Each contestant has to answer questions posted by fellow contestants' mentors. Their ability to express themselves and their wittiness will be put under test.
Drama	50%	There will be two drama skits in each episode. Each Skit consist of three contestants (a mix of males and females).Several unexpected scenarios will also be planted in the drama to test the contestants’ on-the-spot reactions. Guest artistes: Dennis Chew and Quan Yi Fong.

== Awards and prizes ==
Title	Prizes
Champion	Trophy + $25,000 cash + $4,000 worth of products + 2-year contract
1st runner-up	Trophy + $12,000 cash + $2,000 worth of products
2nd runner-up	Trophy + $5,000 cash + $1,000 worth of products
Runners-up	Each $1,000 cash + $1,000 worth of products
Ms Telegenic	$5,000 worth of jewellery
Mr Personality	$5,000 worth of jewellery
Most Popular	$5,000 worth of jewellery

Ms Telegenic and Mr Personality subsidiary awards are decided by the judges.
Most Popular subsidiary award will be determined by public voting.

== Episodic details ==
=== Episode 1 - Grand Debut (21 Aug 2007) ===
Gracing the occasion was Dr Balaji Sadasivan, the Senior Minister of State for Information, Communications and the Arts。

=== Episode 2 - Preliminary Round 1 (28 Aug 2007) ===
20 contestants remained in the competition at this stage.
5 female contestants competed in this episode.
2 will be eliminated.
3 contestants moved on to Quarter Final 1.

The talent segment will be set in a club in the 1920-30s and features MediaCorp actor Adam Chen as narrator.
The acting segment will also be set in the same era but will take place in a shopping street instead.
MediaCorp actress Ng Hui will play a wealthy girl out shopping with her curry-favouring maid.

As the LAST TWO ranking were not shown, F4 and F1 assumed to be the 4th and 5th position respectively.

Index	Name	Talent Segment	Acting Segment	Overall Ranking	Status
F1	Tracy Yap	Dance-cum-taekwondo piece	Curry-favouring maid	5	Eliminated
F2	Celia Pan	Jazz performance on drums	Quick-thinking girl	1	IN
F3	Kola Zhou	Singing Yong Yuan De Wei Xiao	Rough and uncultured salesgirl	2	IN
F4	Priscilla Pan	Salsa dance	Inflexible salesgirl	4	Eliminated
F5	Jeneen Goh	Play Ye Shanghai on the piano	Blur salesgirl	3	IN

=== Episode 3 - Preliminary Round 2 (4 Sept 2007) ===
- 18 contestants remained in the competition at this stage.
- 5 male contestants competed in this episode.
- 2 will be eliminated.
- 3 contestants moved on to Quarter Final 1.

Both talent segment and acting segment will be set in the 1920-30s.
MediaCorp veteran actor Liang Tian will be appearing in the talent segment.
As for the acting segment, the story is featuring 5 neighbors living under one roof in a building.
MediaCorp actress Pan Lingling making a guest appearance as Jerry's shrewd wife.

Index	Name	Talent Segment	Acting Segment	Overall Ranking	Status
M1	张昊艺 Chang Hao Yi	Dancing reggae	Mummy's boy	1	IN
M2	张家荣 Marcus Chang	Performing a piece on the dizi	Righteous hooligan	5	Eliminated
M3	黄冠捷 Reeve Huan	Singing The Music Of The Night	Cynical artist	4	Eliminated
M4	杨伟烈 Jerry Yeo	Singing Ai Shen De Jian	Hen-pecked husband	3	IN
M5	陈邦鋆 Andie Chen	Dancing hip-hop	Rich heir	2	IN

=== Episode 4 - Preliminary Round 3 (11 Sept 2007) ===
16 contestants remained in the competition at this stage.
5 female contestants competed in this episode.
2 will be eliminated.
3 contestants moved on to Quarter Final 2.

Both talent segment and acting segment will be set in the 1940-50s.
The talent segment will feature a movie company interviewing for a movie actress with Star Search alumna Priscelia Chan making a guest appearance.
The acting segment will feature 5 students going on a field trip co-starring with MediaCorp actor Zhang Wen Xiang as their teacher.

Index	Name	Talent Segment	Acting Segment	Overall Ranking	Status
F6	林佩琪 Lin Peiqi	Tap Dancing	Kiasu Student	4	Eliminated
F7	雅慧 Ya Hui	Chinese Satin Dance	Calculative Student	1	IN
F8	李美玲 Tracy Lee	Tongue Twistering Man Tian Xing	Vain Pot Student	2	IN
F9	廖尹宁 Jvnne Leow	Playing a Cello	Slow Reacting Student	5	Eliminated
F10	梁溦芝 Iren Neo	Playing Love Story/Yankee Doodle on YangQin	Boastful Tomboy	3	IN

=== Episode 5 - Preliminary Round 4 (18 Sept 2007) ===
14 contestants remained in the competition at this stage.
5 male contestants competed in this episode.
2 will be eliminated.
3 contestants moved on to Quarter Final 2.

Index	Name	Talent Segment	Acting Segment	Overall Ranking	Status
M6	陈泂江 Desmond Tan	Bartender Show	Sissy Personal Assistant	1	IN
M7	张昊颖 Chang Hao Ying	Locking Dance	Sarcastic Reporter	3	IN
M8	陈侠中 Jackson Tan	Bazil Wushu	Main Editor	2	IN
M9	林克伦 Lin Kelun	Singing	Timid Assistant	5	Eliminated
M10	许嘉洋 Raynard Khor	Play Drums	Photographer Who Demands His Ways	4	Eliminated

=== Episode 6 - Quarter Final 1 (25 Sept 2007) ===
12 contestants remained in the competition at this stage.
3 male and female contestants will compete in this episode.
2 will be eliminated.
4 contestants moved on to Semi Final.

Index	Name	Sing/Dance/Image Segment	FAQ Segment	Acting Segment		
Index	Name	Sing/Dance/Image Segment	FAQ Segment	Skit	Character	Characteristics
F1	Kola Zhou	Gei Wo Yi Ge Wen; Yi Jian Ni Jiu Xiao		1	Ill fated secretary	
F2	Celia Pan	Gei Wo Yi Ge Wen; Yi Jian Ni Jiu Xiao		1	Sassy secretary	
F3	Jeneen Goh	Gei Wo Yi Ge Wen; Yi Jian Ni Jiu Xiao		2		
M1	Andie Chen	Gei Wo Yi Ge Wen; Yi Jian Ni Jiu Xiao		2		
M2	Jerry Yeo	Gei Wo Yi Ge Wen; Yi Jian Ni Jiu Xiao		1		
M3	Chang Hao Yi	Gei Wo Yi Ge Wen; Yi Jian Ni Jiu Xiao		1		Lecherous manager

Index	Name	Ranking			Status
Index	Name	Sing/Dance/Image Segment	Sing/Dance/Image + FAQ Segment	Overall	Status
F1	Kola Zhou			6	
F2	Celia Pan			2	
F3	Jeneen Goh			4	
M1	Andie Chen			1	
M2	Jerry Yeo			3	
M3	Chang Hao Yi			5	

=== Episode 7 - Quarter Final 2 (2 Oct 2007) ===
10 contestants remained in the competition at this stage.
3 female and male contestants competed in this episode.
2 will be eliminated.
4 contestants moved on to Semi Final.

This week, the remaining contestants will travel back time to the colourful time in the 1970s.
Contestants will perform a song-and-dance item to the tunes of Beautiful Sunday and Qiao He which are hits songs back in the 1970s.

As for the acting segment, 3 contestants will act in a skit taking place at Feng Feng Cafe.
Skit 1 involves contestants F6 Lee Mei Leng, M4 Chang Hao Ying and M6 Jackson Tan.
Quan Yi Fong guest-stars as the gossipy café boss Feng Jie.
Skit 2

Index	Name	Sing/Dance/Image Segment	FAQ Segment	Acting Segment		
Index	Name	Sing/Dance/Image Segment	FAQ Segment	Skit	Character	Characteristics
F4	Ya Hui	Beautiful Sunday; Qiao He		2	Waitress	A neurotic girl who fears ghosts and thinks she can see them
F5	Iren Neo	Beautiful Sunday; Qiao He		2	Ah Jiao	A charismatic nightclub singer
F6	Lee Mei Leng	Beautiful Sunday; Qiao He		1	Ah Ling	An innocent girl from a rich family born with a leg longer than the other
M4	Chang Hao Ying	Beautiful Sunday; Qiao He		1	Waiter	A young man passionate about his job
M5	Desmond Tan	Beautiful Sunday; Qiao He		2	Da Ge	An underworld lackey who wants to play big brother
M6	Jackson Tan	Beautiful Sunday; Qiao He		1	Ah Zhong	A chauvinist who relies on women to support him

Index	Name	Ranking			Status
Index	Name	Sing/Dance/Image Segment	Sing/Dance/Image + FAQ Segment	Overall	Status
F4	Koh Yah Hwee	1	3	1	IN
F5	Iren Neo	3	4		Eliminated
F6	Lee Mei Leng	5	5	2	IN
M4	Chang Hao Ying	4	1		Eliminated
M5	Desmond Tan	2	2	4	IN
M6	Jackson Tan	6	6	3	IN

=== Episode 9 - Semi Final ( 21 Oct 2007) ===
8 contestants remained in the competition at this stage.
4 female and male contestants competed in this episode.
2 will be eliminated.
6 contestants moved on to Grand Final.

Index	Name	Sing/Image Segment	Martial Arts Segment	FAQ Segment	Acting Segment		
Index	Name	Sing/Image Segment	Martial Arts Segment	FAQ Segment	Skit	Character	Characteristics
S1	Jeneen Goh				2		
S2	Tracy Lee				1		
S3	Ya Hui				1		
S4	Desmond Tan				1		
S5	Andie Chen				2		
S6	Celia Pan				2		
S7	Jerry Yeo				1		
S8	Jackson Tan				2		

Index	Name	Ranking				Status
Index	Name	Sing/Dance/Image	Sing/Dance/Image + Martial Arts	Sing/Dance/Image + Martial Arts + FAQ	Overall	Status
S1	Jeneen Goh	3	5	5	-	Eliminated
S2	Lee Mei Leng	-	-	6	-	Eliminated
S3	Koh Yah Hwee	4	2	2	2	IN
S4	Desmond Tan	6	3	3	5	IN
S5	Andie Chen	1	1	1	1	IN
S6	Celia Pan	5	6	-	6	IN
S7	Jerry Yeo	-	-	-	3	IN
S8	Jackson Tan	2	4	4	4	IN

=== Episode 10 - Grand Final (4 Nov 2007) ===
6 contestants remained in the competition at this stage.
2 female and 4 male contestants competed in the final.
5 will be eliminated.
1 will be crowned the champion.

Apart from the 10 mentors Zheng Geping, Huang Wenyong, Chen Liping, Chen Hanwei, Tay Ping Hui, Huang Biren, Ivy Lee, Hong Huifang, Edmund Chen and Rayson Tan, Star Search alumni Zoe Tay, Chew Chor Meng, Ix Shen, Felicia Chin, Vivian Lai, Yao Wenlong, Florence Tan, Jeff Wang, Aileen Tan, Brandon Wong, Chen Tianwen, Dennis Chew, Patricia Mok, Bryan Wong and Kym Ng attended the Grand Final. In addition, Taiwanese band Energy made a special guest appearance.

In this critical stage of the competition, the current panel will increase to a total of 6 judges. Besides the 3 resident judges, Taiwanese artiste Lang Tzu-yun, Hong Kong director Alfred Cheung and Senior Vice President of Chinese Drama Kok Len Shoong, Hong Kong actor Kenny Bee, local artiste Fann Wong and Deputy Group CEO (TV) Chang Long Jong will also be accessing the finalists in their performances.

There will also be three subsidiary awards for the six Finalists to compete in: Ms Telegenic Award, Mr Personality Award, and Most Popular Award

Index	Name	Imaging Segment	Special Talent Segment	Eloquence Segment	Acting Segment		
Index	Name	Imaging Segment	Special Talent Segment	Eloquence Segment	Skit	Character	Characteristics
S1	Jerry Yeo	Thai King	Finalists are outfitted in Japanese fireman style performing both individual and team challenges on a ladder.	This round will be a test of the contestants' verbal wit and spontaneity. The invigilators for this round will be MediaCorp’s variety show hosts and the finalists will only know who they are sparring with on the very night itself.	1	Ah Wei	A talented but impecunious musician infatuated with Anna
S2	Celia Pan	Empress	Finalists are outfitted in Japanese fireman style performing both individual and team challenges on a ladder.	This round will be a test of the contestants' verbal wit and spontaneity. The invigilators for this round will be MediaCorp’s variety show hosts and the finalists will only know who they are sparring with on the very night itself.	1	Anna	A kind-hearted and gentle singer/dancer
S3	Jackson Tan	Warrior	Finalists are outfitted in Japanese fireman style performing both individual and team challenges on a ladder.	This round will be a test of the contestants' verbal wit and spontaneity. The invigilators for this round will be MediaCorp’s variety show hosts and the finalists will only know who they are sparring with on the very night itself.	2	Older Brother Yue Ren	A melancholic escaping reality because of love
S4	Andie Chen	Willy Wonka	Finalists are outfitted in Japanese fireman style performing both individual and team challenges on a ladder.	This round will be a test of the contestants' verbal wit and spontaneity. The invigilators for this round will be MediaCorp’s variety show hosts and the finalists will only know who they are sparring with on the very night itself.	2	Yue’Er	An honest man also with his own relationship problems
S5	Koh Yah Hwee	Elf Princess	Finalists are outfitted in Japanese fireman style performing both individual and team challenges on a ladder.	This round will be a test of the contestants' verbal wit and spontaneity. The invigilators for this round will be MediaCorp’s variety show hosts and the finalists will only know who they are sparring with on the very night itself.	3	Shan Shan	A very angry lady who later became a Power Ranger
S6	Desmond Tan	Pirate	Finalists are outfitted in Japanese fireman style performing both individual and team challenges on a ladder.	This round will be a test of the contestants' verbal wit and spontaneity. The invigilators for this round will be MediaCorp’s variety show hosts and the finalists will only know who they are sparring with on the very night itself.	3	Ah Qi	A seemingly flippant young man but is actually very devoted

Position	Ranking		
Position	Imaging Segment	Special Talent Segment	Eloquence Segment
Gold	Andie Chen	Jackson Tan	Andie Chen
Silver	Desmond Tan	Andie Chen	Desmond Tan
Bronze	Jackson Tan	Koh Yah Hwee	Koh Yah Hwee

Overall Results
Awards	Index	Name	姓名
Champion	S4	Andie Chen	陈邦鋆
1st runner-up	S1	Jerry Yeo	杨伟烈
2nd runner-up	S2	Celia Pan	潘虹熹
Runner-up	S3	Jackson Tan	陈侠中
Runner-up	S5	Koh Yah Hwee	许雅慧
Runner-up	S6	Desmond Tan	陈泂江
Ms Telegenic	S5	Koh Yah Hwee	许雅慧
Mr Personality	S3	Jackson Tan	陈侠中
Most Popular	S1	Jerry Yeo	杨伟烈

== See also ==
- Star Search 2003
- Star Search Singapore
