= All That Glitters (Singaporean TV series) =

2023 Singaporean television series

- Promotional banner
- Traditional Chinese: 金色大道
- Simplified Chinese: 金色大道
- Literal meaning: "The Golden Boulevard"
- Hanyu Pinyin: Jīnsè dàdào
- Genre: Drama
- Screenplay by: Ang Eng Tee
- Story by: Ang Eng Tee
- Directed by: Huang Fenfei
- Starring: Desmond Tan; Jeremy Chan; Ayden Sng; Chantalle Ng; Hong Ling; He Ying Ying
- Opening theme: "A Moment in Time (一时的选择)" by JJ Lin
- Ending theme: "One Last Thing (如果我还剩一件事情可以做)" by JJ Lin; "Eternally (直到最后)" by Serene Koong; "Blind Spot (盲点)" by The Freshman; "Soaring In The Sky (翱翔天空)" by Desmond Tan, Jeremy Chan and Ayden Sng; "Let Go" by Maia Lee; "A Tiny Bird (Remake) (我是一只小小鸟)" by Jeremy Chan; "Life Traveler (Remake) (生命过客)" by Desmond Tan
- Country of origin: Singapore
- Original language: Mandarin
- No. of seasons: 1
- No. of episodes: 30

Production
- Executive producer: Paul Yuen
- Cinematography: Fang Xinglong; Lin Zhili
- Editor: Li Xingmin
- Running time: 45 minutes
- Production company: Mediacorp

Original release
- Network: Channel 8
- Release: 18 September – 27 October 2023

All That Glitters (Chinese: 金色大道; previously titled Road to Riches) is a 2023 Singaporean drama series starring Desmond Tan, Jeremy Chan, Ayden Sng, Chantalle Ng, Hong Ling and He Ying Ying. It airs every Monday to Friday, 9pm, on Channel 8 and meWATCH from 18 September 2023.

== Synopsis ==
One day, a businessman is found murdered in a villa, with his valuables all missing. The businessman is Jianzhi and the police puts out an international wanted notice for suspects Musen and Jintiao. It turns out Jianzhi, Musen and Jintiao were good friends in the past. As the suspect duo begins their escape, the secrets of the trio are gradually uncovered.

== Cast ==
- Desmond Tan as Lin Musen (Liu Mu)
  - Alfred Ong as young Lin Musen (Liu Mu)
- Jeremy Chan as Huang Jintiao
  - Lincoln Ang as young Huang Jintiao
- Ayden Sng as He Jianzhi
  - Nicholas Lim as young He Jianzhi
- Chantalle Ng as Li Zhenyu
  - Zheng Jiaying as young Li Zhenyu
- Hong Ling as Li Zhenting
- He Ying Ying as Lin Jiahui
  - Lin Peiyan as young Lin Jiahui
- Zhang Zetong as Richard Mo
- Tyler Ten as Sudsakorn
- Pan Lingling as Pan Xiaomei
- Guo Liang as Mo Yicong
- Li Yinzhu as Granny Thunder (Leigongpo)
- Edwin Goh as Arthur Thng
- Chen Yixin as Mo Xuemin
  - Natalie Mae Tan as young Mo Xuemin
- Gavin Teo as Li Weihao
  - Ethan Ng as young Li Weihao
- Jasmine Sim as Li Fang
- Zen Chong as Roy
- Hong Guorui as Da-bo
- Tracer Wong as Da-bo's wife
- Das DD as Ah Meng
- Ye Shipin as Ah Gen
- Adele Wong as Weng Suxin
- Charlie Goh as George
- Ivory Chia as Beibei
- Brian Ng as Ah Ming
- Joey Feng as Ah Hua
- Lina Ng as Zhu-jie
- Lin Weiwen as Hai-ge
- Teddy Tang as Patrick
- Asher Su as Director A-fu
- Bunz Bao as Lin Congming
- Sam Chong as Tang Daiwei

=== Special appearance ===
- Hugo Ng as Ah Tong
- Peter Yu as Stall owner
- Kenneth Chung as Fengshui master
- Darren Lim as Big Boss

== Awards and nominations ==
Organisation	Year	Category	Nominees	Result	Ref
Star Awards	2024	Best Director	Png Keh Hock	Nominated	
Star Awards	2024	Best Director	Wong Foong Hwee	Won	
Star Awards	2024	Best Screenplay	Ang Eng Tee	Won	
Star Awards	2024	Best Drama Serial	—N/a	Won	
Star Awards	2024	Best Actor	Desmond Tan	Nominated	
Star Awards	2024	Best Actor	Jeremy Chan	Won	
Star Awards	2024	Best Actress	Chantalle Ng	Nominated	
Star Awards	2024	Best Supporting Actor	Zhang Ze Tong	Won	
Star Awards	2024	Young Talent Award	Alfred Ong	Nominated	
Star Awards	2024	Young Talent Award	Chia Zhi Xuan Ivory	Nominated	
Star Awards	2024	Young Talent Award	Natalie Mae Tan	Nominated	
Star Awards	2024	MY PICK Favourite Show Stealer	Ayden Sng	Won	
Star Awards	2024	MY PICK Favourite Show Stealer	Desmond Tan	Nominated	
Star Awards	2024	MY PICK Favourite Show Stealer	Jeremy Chan	Nominated	
Star Awards	2024	MY PICK Favourite CP	Desmond Tan and Chantalle Ng	Won	
Star Awards	2024	MY PICK Favourite CP	Jeremy Chan and Pan Ling Ling	Nominated	
Star Awards	2024	MY PICK Most Hated Villain	Zhang Ze Tong	Won	

== Production ==
Filming took place in Alor Setar, Malaysia, and Hat Yai, Thailand for six weeks before moving to Singapore. Filming was completed in July 2023.
