= Star Search (Singaporean TV series) season 8 =

Star Search
- Season 8
- Hosted by: Sharon Au, Xu Nailin
- Winners: Kelvin Cui Peng, Felicia Chin
- Finals venue: MediaCorp TV Theatre

Release
- Original network: MediaCorp
- Original release: 29 June 2003

Season chronology
- Next → Season 9

Star Search 2003 is the 8th installment of Star Search. From March 2003, auditions started in three countries, Singapore, Malaysia and China to search for Chinese language-speaking acting talent. Selected contestants are provided training for a final selection in each country. Each of the 3 countries selects 4 Star Search contestants (2 male, 2 female) to compete at the Grand Finals on June 29 in Singapore.

== Contestants information ==
Male Contestants				Female Contestants			
Index	Name	Chinese name	Country	Index	Name	Chinese name	Country
M1	James Li	李健逊	China	F1	Wayne Chua	蔡佩璇	Malaysia
M2	Ling Hung Liong	林训良	Malaysia	F2	Cheryl Chin	秦依凌	Singapore
M3	Li Qi Yang	李企扬	Singapore	F3	Tai Chien Yuen	戴倩云	Malaysia
M4	Ng Hong Shen	伍洪升	Malaysia	F4	Zhang Lin Lin	张琳琳	China
M5	Huang Shi Yu	黄仕昱	Singapore	F5	Yang Han	杨晗	China
M6	Cui Peng	崔鹏	China	F6	Felicia Chin	陈凤玲	Singapore

== Format ==
During the 3-hour power-packed competition, the 12 finalists competed in the areas of star appeal, acting, singing and dancing, and hosting.

This year viewers are allowed to vote for the best contestant via SMS, contributing the remaining 10% of the total score.

== Judges ==
Name	Credential
Stefanie Sun	Local Talented Singer
Wu Siyuan	Renowned Hong Kong director
Sally Wu Xiaoli	Phoenix InfoNews Channel Presenter
Xie Shaoguang	Mediacorp actor
Zoe Tay	Mediacorp Actress
Madam Chua Foo Yong	CEO, MediaCorp TV
Mr. Chang Long Jong	CEO, MediaCorp Studios

== Judging criteria ==
Star Appeal - 50%
Markers include beauty/good looks, audience appeal, charisma, outstanding personality, confidence level

Talent & Performance - 50%
Markers include Acting, Drama, Comedy, Stage, Singing/Dancing and Hosting abilities

== Awards and prizes ==
Awards and prizes	Winner
Male Champion	M6 崔鹏
Female Champion	F6 Felicia Chin
Mr Charisma	M3 李企扬
Miss Vitality	F6 Felicia Chin
Best Singing & Dancing Potential	F3 戴倩云
Best Acting Potential	F6 Felicia Chin
Best Hosting Potential	M6 崔鹏

== Imaging Segment ==
Get ready for a night of drama, song and dance as finalists don and take on a potpourri of characters such as White and Green Snake in period drama Madam White Snake, characters from the musical Chang & Eng and the characters of Anna and the King in The King And I.

Imaging Segment
Index	Name	Song Choice
M1	李健逊	Alaadin 阿拉丁
F1	Wayne Chua	Alaadin 阿拉丁
M2	林训良	Madame Butterfly 蝴蝶夫人
F2	秦依凌	Madame Butterfly 蝴蝶夫人
M3	李企扬	The King And I 国王与我
F3	戴倩云	The King And I 国王与我
M4	伍洪升	Chang & Eng 菖与英
M5	黄仕昱	Chang & Eng 菖与英
F4	张琳琳	Madam White Snake 白蛇传
F5	杨晗	Madam White Snake 白蛇传
M6	崔鹏	Butterfly Lovers 梁山伯与祝英台
F6	Felicia Chin	Butterfly Lovers 梁山伯与祝英台

== Round : Hosting segment ==
Male Contestants			Female Contestants		
Index	Name	Interviewed "Singer"	Index	Name	Interviewed "Singer"
M1	李健逊	Jolin Cai 蔡一零 (portrayed by Dennis Chew); Biggest fan 歌迷 (portrayed by Huang Wenyong)	F1	Wayne Chua	J. Zhou 周结论 (portrayed by Jeff Wang); Biggest fan 歌迷 (portrayed by Huang Wenyong)
M2	林训良	Jolin Cai 蔡一零 (portrayed by Dennis Chew); Biggest fan 歌迷 (portrayed by Huang Wenyong)	F2	秦依凌	J. Zhou 周结论 (portrayed by Jeff Wang); Biggest fan 歌迷 (portrayed by Huang Wenyong)
M3	李企扬	Jolin Cai 蔡一零 (portrayed by Dennis Chew); Biggest fan 歌迷 (portrayed by Huang Wenyong)	F3	戴倩云	J. Zhou 周结论 (portrayed by Jeff Wang); Biggest fan 歌迷 (portrayed by Huang Wenyong)
M4	伍洪升	F-Not-4 F不是; Vanest Wu 吴剑豪 (portrayed by Jeff Wang); Vick Zhou 周愚民 (portrayed by Dennis Chew); Gerry Yan 颜成婿 (portrayed by Mark Lee); Can Chu 朱笑天 (portrayed by Huang Wenyong)	F4	张琳琳	Aaron Kok 郭不成 (portrayed by Mark Lee)
M5	黄仕昱	F-Not-4 F不是; Vanest Wu 吴剑豪 (portrayed by Jeff Wang); Vick Zhou 周愚民 (portrayed by Dennis Chew); Gerry Yan 颜成婿 (portrayed by Mark Lee); Can Chu 朱笑天 (portrayed by Huang Wenyong)	F5	杨晗	Aaron Kok 郭不成 (portrayed by Mark Lee)
M6	崔鹏	F-Not-4 F不是; Vanest Wu 吴剑豪 (portrayed by Jeff Wang); Vick Zhou 周愚民 (portrayed by Dennis Chew); Gerry Yan 颜成婿 (portrayed by Mark Lee); Can Chu 朱笑天 (portrayed by Huang Wenyong)	F6	Felicia Chin	Aaron Kok 郭不成 (portrayed by Mark Lee)

== Round : Acting segment ==
In the final round, the finalists portray various characters from popular Singaporean productions.

=== Scene 1: Mysterious Client 神秘大客户 ===
Guest starring: Chew Chor Meng as Ah Bee from Don't Worry Be Happy & Lobang King, and Hong Huifang as Pan Jinglian from Viva Le Famille and A Toast of Love

Male Contestants			Female Contestants		
Index	Name	Character from Drama	Index	Name	Character from Drama
M1	李健逊	54088 from My Genie (Huang Yiliang)	F1	Wayne Chua	Rosie from Phua Chu Kang (Irene Ang)
M2	林训良	Lin Yin Qin from A Toast of Love	F2	秦依凌	Mabel from Lobang King (Irene Ang)
M3	李企扬	Phua Chu Kang from Phua Chu Kang (Gurmit Singh)	F3	戴倩云	Little Genie '0385985' from My Genie (Fiona Xie)

=== Scene 2: My Sassy Customer 我的野蛮顾客 ===
Guest starring: Huang Wenyong as Huang Jinlai from Don't Worry Be Happy & Lobang King, and Li Nanxing as Ah Bao from The Vagrant

Male Contestants			Female Contestants		
Index	Name	Character from Drama	Index	Name	Character from Drama
M4	伍洪升	Jerry Khoo from I Not Stupid (Richard Low)	F4	张琳琳	Fan Kelian from Beautiful Connection (Huang Biren)
M5	黄仕昱	Lion King from Beautiful Connection (Xie Shaoguang)	F5	杨晗	Fan Keli from Beautiful Connection (Aileen Tan)
M6	崔鹏	Yang Xiong from Holland V (Xie Shaoguang)	F6	Felicia Chin	Mo Wanwan from Holland V (Chen Liping)

== Round : Singing segment ==
In conjunction with celebrations for MediaCorp TV’S 40th anniversary, the 12 finalists will also sing songs from the 4 decades.

Male Contestants			Female Contestants		
Index	Name	Song Choice	Index	Name	Song Choice
M1	李健逊	雨中即景	F1	Wayne Chua	一见你就笑
M2	林训良	雨中即景	F2	秦依凌	一见你就笑
M3	李企扬	雨中即景	F3	戴倩云	一见你就笑
M4	伍洪升	失恋阵线联盟	F4	张琳琳	直来直往
M5	黄仕昱	失恋阵线联盟	F5	杨晗	直来直往
M6	崔鹏	失恋阵线联盟	F6	Felicia Chin	直来直往

== See also ==
- Star Search 2007
- Star Search Singapore
