= Sheryl Ang =

Singaporean actress (born 1998)

- Born: 6 September 1998 (age 28); Singapore
- Other name: Hong Liting
- Education: Canossa Convent Primary School; Saint Anthony's Canossian Secondary School; Temasek Polytechnic
- Occupations: Actress; model
- Years active: 2019–present
- Modeling information
- Height: 1.75 m (5 ft 9 in)

Chinese name
- Traditional Chinese: 洪麗婷
- Simplified Chinese: 洪丽婷
- Hanyu Pinyin: Hóng Lìtíng

Sheryl Ang (born 6 September 1998) is a Singaporean actress and model.

== Early life and career ==
Ang has an elder brother and a sister who is a year older than her. Ang's mother is a secretary for a headhunting company and her father, a service manager in the automotive industry. Ang attended Canossa Convent Primary School and Saint Anthony's Canossian Secondary School, where she studied drama as one of the compulsory subjects in Secondary 1 and 2, and later continued to opt for it as an elective in upper secondary. She subsequently went on to complete her diploma in Cybersecurity and Digital Forensics at Temasek Polytechnic.

Upon graduation, Ang applied to be a Singapore Airlines flight attendant, but was rejected. While exploring different career options, she took up part-time jobs as a stilt walker and event mascot. At an event at 313@somerset for the mall's mascot job, Ang was discovered by a photographer who would later referred her to the modelling agency, Nu Models, owned by local actress-model Sheila Sim. She was signed to the agency for about three years, before joining Mediacorp's Star Search 2019 at the agency's suggestion. She emerged as a finalist in the competition and has since appeared in dramas such as All Around You (2020), Mister Flower (2020) and Watch Out! Alexius (2020). In 2021, she landed her first lead role in crime thriller Key Witness, alongside Desmond Tan and Denise Camillia Tan.

Aside from being able to speak fluent English and Mandarin, Ang is also able to converse in Korean. She plays the guitar and does kickboxing and diving.

== Personal life ==
Ang was in a one-year-and-seven-month relationship with a musician til August 2019.

She has a strong interest in spirituality and psychic intuition, and has advocated self-love and self-acceptance in interviews. She also sells crystals on her social media platform from time to time.

== Filmography ==
Ang has appeared in the following programmes and films:

=== Television series ===
Year	Title	Role	Notes	Ref.
2019	The Encounter	Emily		
2020	All Around You	He Ruohua		
2020	Remember to Forget	Fang Huitian		
2020	Mister Flower	Chloe		
2020	Watch Out! Alexius	Mona	meWATCH drama	
2021	Key Witness	Wang Yuxuan		
2021	The Heartland Hero		Cameo	
2022	Healing Heroes	Jovie Ho Renhui		
2022	First of April	Bella / 洪俪颖 / Sophia	meWATCH drama	
2022	You Can Be An Angel 4	Zhang Shutong		
2022	Leave No Soul Behind	Elly Wong		
2022	The Interns		Web series	
2023	The Sky is Still Blue	Chen Yu-an		
2024	To Be Loved	Sun Wang Zi-yang		
2026	Aunty Lee's deadly delights	Yanna K		

=== Film ===
- Pretty When I Cry (2020; short film)

=== Variety show ===
- Aus-Getaway (2020)

== Discography ==
=== Singles ===
Year	Song title	Notes
2020	"New Year Coming"	MediaCorp Music Lunar New Year Album 21

== Awards and nominations ==
Year	Award	Category	Nominated work	Result	Ref
2021	Star Awards	Best Newcomer	All Around You	Nominated	
2023	Star Awards	Top 3 Most Popular Rising Stars	—N/a	Nominated	
2024	Star Awards	Top 3 Most Popular Rising Stars	—N/a	Nominated	
2025	Star Awards	Top 3 Most Popular Rising Stars	—N/a	Nominated	
2026	Star Awards	Top 10 Most Popular Female Artistes	—N/a	Nominated	
