= Tiffany Ho (actress) =

Hong Kong actress based in Singapore

- Born: Tiffany Ho; 23 August 2005 (age 21); Hong Kong
- Education: Nanyang Polytechnic
- Occupation: Actress
- Years active: 2024–present
- Agent: The Celebrity Agency
- Awards: Winner; Star Search 2024

Chinese name
- Traditional Chinese: 何睿烔
- Simplified Chinese: 何睿烔
Transcriptions
Standard Mandarin
- Hanyu Pinyin: Hé Ruìtóng
Yue: Cantonese
- Jyutping: Ho4 Jeoi6-tung4

Tiffany Ho (born 23 August 2005) is a Hong Kong actress based in Singapore. She is the winner of Star Search 2024.

== Early life and education ==
Ho was born on 23 August 2005 in Hong Kong. She came to Singapore to study in 2019 at 14 years old. She is studying at Nanyang Polytechnic currently, pursuing information technology course. She trained in dance from a young age, and is skilled in jazz, ballet, hip-hop and contemporary dance.

== Career ==
Ho participated in Star Search 2024 as the youngest contestant and championed the contest. She played Sam in Theatre of Life (人生剧场), the contestants' short film screened at the grand finals. She was signed on by The Celebrity Agency (TCA) of Mediacorp after winning the contest.

In 2025, Ho played Lisa in the Lunar New Year special Lucky Lucky! (幸福的Lucky！), which was released on mewatch on New Year's Day. In June that year, she performed in Resilient Hearts (心手相连献爱心), the televised charity show marking the 55th anniversary of the Singapore Heart Foundation.

In January 2026, Ho appeared alongside Xiang Yun, Zhu Ze Liang and others in Money Money (马力马力), Mediacorp's Lunar New Year music video for the year. In May, she acted in You, All along (原来我爱的只是你), one of the pilot telemovies produced under Inkspiration, Mediacorp's Chinese scriptwriting mentorship programme supported by the Infocomm Media Development Authority.

In 2026, Ho and Gini Chang launched a Cantonese podcast/variety show titled NG Classroom on the YouTube channel "Beyond Gini".

== Filmography ==
=== Television and short films ===
Year	Title	Role	Notes	Ref.
2024	Theatre of Life 人生剧场	Sam	Contestants' short film, Star Search 2024 grand finals	
2025	Lucky Lucky! 幸福的Lucky！	Lisa	Lunar New Year special	
2026	You, All along 原来我爱的只是你		Pilot telemovie under Inkspiration	

=== Variety ===
Year	Title	Role	Notes	Ref.
2025	Resilient Hearts 心手相连献爱心	Performer	Charity show for the 55th anniversary of the Singapore Heart Foundation	

=== Music videos ===
Year	Title	Notes	Ref.
2026	Money Money 马力马力	Mediacorp Lunar New Year music video	

=== Podcast ===
Year	Title	Notes	Ref.
2026–present	NG Classroom	Hosted with Gini Chang	
