= Star Search (Singaporean TV series) =

Reality talent search television series

- 才华横溢出新秀
- Theme music composer: "飞高梦远"; Lyrics by Chen Jiaming, composed by Iskandar Ismail
- Country of origin: Singapore
- No. of seasons: 12

Original release
- Network: Mediacorp Channel 8
- Release: 1988 – present

Star Search (Chinese: 才华横溢出新秀; pinyin: Cai Hua Heng Yi Chu Xing Xiu) is a television show organised by Mediacorp to scout for Chinese language-speaking acting talent. The first season premiered in 1988 and has produced 12 installments since. The most recent twelfth season premiered in 2024.

== History ==
Star Search started out as a Singapore local talent show, initially restricted to residents of Singapore. After the Singapore Broadcasting Corporation discontinued its drama training courses in the early 1990s, Star Search became one of Channel 8's main sources to scout for talent, which was met with several successes where many "alumni" have embarked their career with Mediacorp after the competition, whereas certain contestants deemed better may also be awarded a contract after competition ended. In 1999, the show expanded to include regions such as Malaysia, Hong Kong, Taiwan and Guangzhou (China), then via China and across Asia towards the 2000s millennium. From 1999 to 2003, the show took the format of a knockout competition where the male and female champions and first runners-up from each country will go to Singapore compete for the overall champion prize in their respective genders; however, when the show returned for a ninth season in 2007, the champions per gender and its international tournament format was abolished, reverting back to the traditional format while retaining international contestants till this day.

Each season of the shows had a period of hiatus of at least two years, and up to nine years between the tenth and the eleventh season. The upcoming twelfth season will premiere in 2024 after five years.

While there is no official theme music released from the first three seasons, its titular theme, "飞高梦远" was introduced starting from the fourth season in 1995, and was still used to the day. The title is composed by Iskandar Ismail and lyrics provided by veteran Chen Jiaming.

== Format ==
Auditions typically take place several months beforehand. The chosen contestants are sent for training and begin rehearsing. Finalists are usually mentored by veteran Mediacorp artists. There are different segments to test the contestant in several areas, as scores are weighed and factor towards it to determine the result. Examples such as acting out on a skit featuring certain artists; while it is scripted, the artists may improvise to test the contestant's ability to do so; a Q&A segment where contestants are tested on their oratorical skills through a randomly chosen question; a performance segment whereas contestants performed a special item (such as a drama skit) and judged based on their charisma, confidence and ability to perform under pressure; and appearance such as First impression, fashion and talent performances besides acting. Between 1999 and 2003, televoting are also applied whereas contestants are also tested on popularity as well; televoting reappeared in 2007 but only through a fan-based award, and did not return in 2010 since.

They are judged by a panel consisting of both local and foreign celebrities such as Anita Mui, Chow Yun-fat, Alfred Cheung, Andy Lau, Stephen Fung, Simon Yam, Carina Lau, Raymond Lam and Sandra Ng, and since the 1990s, former alumnus, such as the first season winner Zoe Tay also accompanied as a judge, a mentor or an advisor, depending on the season.

Between seasons four and eight, in corporation with international contestant's participating since then, eliminations applied based on gender and that one winner from each gender will be decided. However, beginning on the ninth season, the gender-based category format was scrapped and that any contestants regardless of gender can win and become the final three for the season.

Depending on season, each winner (and up to third place) would be awarded a full-time contract with Mediacorp besides other prizes (such as contingent and character awards), though other finalists deemed suitable enough are often given contracts as well.

== Past winners ==
=== 1988 to 1997 ===
| Year | Winner | | 1st Runner up | | 2nd Runner up | |
|---|---|---|---|---|---|---|
| 1988 | Zoe Tay | | Aileen Tan | | Jazreel Low | |
| 1990 | Chew Chor Meng | | Margaret Lee | | Rayson Tan | |
| 1993 | Ivy Lee | | Lina Ng | | Eugenia Lee 李月仪 | |
| Year | Male | Female | Male | Female | Male | Female |
| 1995 | Ix Shen | Jacelyn Tay | Christopher Lee | Ziozio Lim 林倩萍 | Aric Ho 何志健 | Phyllis Quek |
| 1997 | Jerry Chang | Florence Tan | Sean Tang 陈思恩 | Amanda Ho 何芸珊 | Andi Lim 林伟文 | Michelle Liu 刘铃铃 |

=== 1999 ===
| Year | Overall | | Singapore | | Malaysia | | Hong Kong | | Taiwan | | Guangdong (China) | |
| Year | Male winner | Female winner | Male winner | Female winner | Male winner | Female winner | Male winner | Female winner | Male winner | Female winner | Male winner | Female winner |
|---|---|---|---|---|---|---|---|---|---|---|---|---|
| 1999 | Jeff Wang | Vivian Lai | Nick Shen | Vivian Lai | Dixon Loo 罗斯益 | Samantha Toh 卓淑怡 | Fu Xiaoming 付小明 | Pink Lai 黎洁屏 | Jeff Wang | Liu Xiaomei 刘晓梅 | Qi Yuwu | Elaine Liu 刘凌 |

=== 2001 to 2003 ===
| Year | Overall | | Singapore | | Malaysia | | Shanghai (China) | |
| Year | Male winner | Female winner | Male winner | Female winner | Male winner | Female winner | Male winner | Female winner |
|---|---|---|---|---|---|---|---|---|
| 2001 | Shi Bin 施斌 | Michelle Liow 廖莹莹 | Alan Tern | Joey Ng 黄玉霞 | Gary Yap | Michelle Liow 廖莹莹 | Sun Li and Le Yao 乐瑶 | Hu Wensui and Shi Bin 施斌 |
| Year | Overall | | Singapore | | Malaysia | | China | |
| Year | Male winner | Female winner | Male winner | Female winner | Male winner | Female winner | Male winner | Female winner |
| 2003 | Cui Peng | Felicia Chin | Huang Shiyu 黄仕昱 and Li Qiyang 李企扬 | Cheryl Chin and Felicia Chin | Ng Hong Shen 伍洪升 | Chua Poi Suan 蔡佩璇 | James Lee 李健逊 and Cui Peng | Zhang Lingling 张琳琳 and Yang Han 杨晗 |

=== 2007 to 2024 ===
| Year | Winner | 1st Runner up | 2nd Runner up |
|---|---|---|---|
| 2007 | Andie Chen | Yeo Wee Lie Jerry | Pan Hung Hsi Celia 陈侠中 |
| 2010 | Jeffrey Xu | Peggy Lin 林佩琪 | Adeline Lim 林赞银 |
| 2019 | Zhang Zetong | Herman Keh | Ye Jiayun 叶佳昀 |
| 2024 | Tiffany Ho | Gladys Bay 马䲰娗 | Jona Chung 仲伟杰 |

== Notable past contestants ==
- Chen Hanwei (1988)
- Peter Yu (1990)
- Bernard Tan (1990)
- Ann Kok (1993)
- Yao Wenlong (1993)
- Collin Chee (1993)
- Carole Lin (1995)
- Brandon Wong (1995)
- Yvonne Lim (1997)
- Vincent Ng (1997)
- Deborah Sim (1997)
- Constance Song (1997)
- Joey Swee (1997)
- Evelyn Tan (1997)
- Apple Hong (1999)
- Priscelia Chan (1999)
- Zen Chong (2001)
- Melvin Sia (2003)
- Tracy Lee (2007)
- James Seah (2010)
