= Star Awards for Best Entertainment Special Programme =

Singaporean television award

Star Awards for Best Entertainment Special Programme 最佳综艺特备节目
- Current: Star Awards 2024
- Awarded for: Best overall performance in a Mediacorp variety special
- Country: Singapore
- Presented by: Mediacorp
- First award: 1998
- Currently held by: Vacant

The Star Awards for Best Entertainment Special Programme is an award presented annually at the Star Awards, a ceremony that was established in 1994.

The category was introduced in 1998, at the 5th Star Awards ceremony; NKF 5th Anniversary Charity Show received the award and it is given in honour of a Mediacorp variety special which has delivered an outstanding overall performance. The nominees are determined by a team of judges employed by Mediacorp; winners are selected by a majority vote from the entire judging panel.

Since its inception, the award has been given to 21 variety specials. Star Awards 2022 – Awards Ceremony is the most recent winner in this category. Since the ceremony held in 2023, Star Awards remain as the only variety special to win in this category 11 times, surpassing NKF Charity Show which has six wins. In addition, Star Awards has been nominated on 18 occasions, more than any other variety special. Lunar New Year's Eve Special holds the record for most nominations without a win, with 11.

The award was not presented in 2000, 2018 & 2024.

== Recipients ==
Year	Title	Nominees	Ref
1998	NKF 5th Anniversary Charity Show 群星照亮千万心 - 新视艺人齐献力	Star Awards 1997 红星大奖'97; Lunar New Year's Eve Special 1998 虎啸春到喜洋洋; Labour Day Special 团结共进庆五一; NKF 5th Anniversary Charity Show 2 群星照亮千万心 - 海外艺人齐献力	
1999	NKF 6th Anniversary Charity Show 群星照亮千万心 - 新视艺人齐献力	Star Search 1999 Show 1 才华横溢出新秀 - 亚洲之星; Star Search 1999 Show 2 才华横溢出新秀 - 狮城之星; Lunar New Year's Eve Special 1999 玉兔贺岁迎丰年; MCS All-Stars Charity 全星展艺献温情	
2001	NKF Charity Show 2 2001 群星照亮千万心 - 天地绮梦献爱心2001	Lunar New Year's Eve Special 2001 金蛇运转贺新年; NKF Charity Show 1 2001 群星照亮千万心 - 劲爆群星显温情2001; Star Search 2001 Malaysia 大马才华横溢出新秀; Star Search 2001 Grand Finals 才华横溢出新秀总决赛	
2002	NKF Charity Show 2 群星照亮千万心 - 魅力闪耀天地情	Affairs Of The Heart 心手相连; Lunar New Year's Eve Special 2002 骏马奔腾迎新春; NKF Charity Show 1 群星照亮千万心 - 爱无界限传温情; Star Awards 2001 红星大奖2001	
2003	NKF 10th Anniversary Charity Show 2 群星照亮千万心 - 天地有爱无极限	Lunar New Year's Eve Special 2003 三羊开泰迎新年; NKF 10th Anniversary Charity Show 1 群星照亮千万心 - 滚石星光映狮城; Star Awards 2002 红星大奖2002; Star Search 2003 才华横溢出新秀2003	
2004	NKF Charity Show 1 群星照亮千万心 - 熠熠星辉耀狮城	The Cancer Charity Show 癌过有晴天; Lunar New Year's Eve Special 2004 灵猴献宝贺新春; Children Medical Fund Charity Show 全情真爱满童心; Star Awards 2003 红星大奖2003	
2005	Ren Ci Charity Show 2005 仁心慈爱照万千2005	Lunar New Year's Eve Special 2005 天鸡报喜贺新春; NKF Charity Show 1 群星照亮千万心 - 星光璀璨耀天地; Project SuperStar Grand Finals 绝对SuperStar总决赛; Star Awards 2004 红星大奖2004	
2006	Ren Ci Charity Show 2006 仁心慈爱照万千2006	Campus SuperStar 校园SuperStar; It's Showtime! 全民创意争霸赛; SuperBand 非常SuperBand; Star Idol 明星偶像	
2007	Star Awards 2006	Lunar New Year's Eve Special 2007 金猪贺岁庆肥年; Project SuperStar 2007 Grand Finals 绝对SuperStar 2007 总决赛; Ren Ci Charity Show 2007 仁心慈爱照万千2007; Thye Hwa Kuan Charity Show 2007 一心一德为善乐	
2009	MediaCorp 45th Anniversary Gala 45载光芒8方贺台庆	S-POP Hurray! Concert S-POP万岁！音乐大典; Star Awards 25th Drama Anniversary 红星大奖之戏剧情牵25; Star Search 2007 Grand Finals 才华横溢出新秀2007总决赛; SuperBand Grand Finals 非常Superband – 大决战; The Sichuan Earthquake Charity Show 让爱川流不息	
2010	The Chinese Challenge FINALS 华文？谁怕谁！总决赛	Campus SuperStar 2009 Grand Finals 校园Superstar 2009总决赛; SPD Charity Show 2009 真情无障爱; Star Awards 2009 红星大奖2009; The Little Nyonya's Big Reunion 小娘惹大团圆	
2011	Star Awards 2010 - Show 1	Ren Ci Charity Show 2010 仁心慈爱照万千2010; Star Search 2010 Grand Finals 才华横溢出新秀2010总决赛; Thong Chai Charity Night 同济医院慈善夜; Thye Hwa Kuan Charity Show 2010 太和观 一心一德为善乐	
2012	Star Awards 2011 - Show 1	ComChest TrueHearts 2011 Charity Show 公益献爱心; Lunar New Year's Eve Special 2011 金兔呈祥喜迎春; Star Awards 2011 - Show 2 金碧辉映 红星大奖2011; SPD Charity Show 2011 真情无障爱	
2013	Star Awards 2012 - Show 1	Channel 8 Countdown Party 2013 at Vivocity 8频道跨年派对; Lunar New Year's Eve Special 2012 金龙腾飞庆丰年; Star Awards 2012 - Show 2 红星大奖2012颁奖礼; Thye Hwa Kuan Charity Show 2013 太和观一心一德为善乐	
2014	Star Awards 2013 - Show 2	Remembering Huang Wenyong 星光不朽 黄文永; Celebrate TV50 欢庆电视50; Singapore Children's Society Charity Show 童心童意献爱心; SPD Charity Show 2013 真情无障爱	
2015	Star Awards 20 - Show 2	ComChest Care & Share Charity Show 2014 爱分享 分享爱; Lunar New Year's Eve Special 2014 骏马奔腾喜迎春; Star Awards 20 - Show 1 红星大奖20 - 第一场; Project SuperStar 2014 Grand Finals 绝对SuperStar 2014 总决赛	
2016	GeTai Challenge: The Ultimate Battle	Thye Hwa Kuan Charity Show 2015 太和观一心一德为善乐; SPD Charity Show 2015 真情无障爱; Star Awards 2015 Show 1 红星大奖2015 加利谷闪耀星光; Star Awards 2015 Show 2 红星大奖2015 加利谷颁奖典礼	
2017	Star Awards 2016 - Part 2	Lions Charity Show 2016 情牵白首爱不息; Lunar New Year's Eve Special 2016 灵猴庆丰年; Star Awards 2016 - Part 1 红星大奖2016 颁奖典礼 上半场; Star Awards 2016 - Walk of Fame 红星大奖2016 星光大道	
2019	SPOP SING! - Grand Final	Community Chest Charity TV Show 2018 - 公益关爱相助35年; Getai Challenge 2018 Grand Final - 歌台星力量 兴-旺-发 大决赛; Lunar New Year's Eve Special 2018 - 阿狗狗旺旺过好年; Star Awards 2018 - 红星大奖 2018	
2021	Star Awards 2019	LNY Eve Special 2020 - 裕鼠鼠纳福迎春乐; Sian Chay Bonding With Love Charity Show 2019 - 善济全民爱心夜; SPD CHarity Show 2019 - SPD真情无障爱; Star Search 2019-Grand Final - 才华横溢出新秀2019-总决赛	
2022	Star Awards 2021 - Awards Ceremony	LNY Eve Special 2021 - 福满牛年MooMoo乐; River Hongbao 2021 - 新加坡派 春到河畔2021; Star Awards 2021 - Backstage Live : Artistes' Preparation - 红星大奖2021 幕后直击 : 整妆待发; Star Awards 2021 - Walk of Fame - 红星大奖2021 - 星光大道	
2023	Star Awards 2022 – Awards Ceremony	Lunar New Year's Eve Special 2022 旺虎泰哥旺得福; River Hongbao 2022 - Singapore Talent Night 新加坡派春到河畔 2022; Star Awards 2022 – Backstage LIVE 红星大奖2022 - 幕后直击; The Star Voice 2022 - Grand Final 寻找星声音 2022 大决赛	

^{^[I]} Each year is linked to the article about the Star Awards held that year.

== Category facts ==
Most wins

Title	Wins
Star Awards	10
NKF Charity Show	6
Ren Ci Charity Show	2

Most nominations

Title	Nominations
Star Awards	25
Lunar New Year's Eve Special	12
NKF Charity Show	12
Star Search	7
Ren Ci Charity Show	4
SPD Charity Show	4
Thye Hwa Kuan Charity Show	4
Project SuperStar	3
GeTai Challenge	2

== See also ==
- Star Awards
- Star Awards for Best Variety Show Host
