= Project SuperStar season 3 =

Project SuperStar
- Season 3
- Hosted by: Dasmond Koh; Jeremy Chan; Shane Pow
- Judges: Roy Li; Dawn Yip; Eric Ng; Tiger Huang (grand final); Lee Wei Song (grand final)
- Winner: Alfred Sim
- Winning coach: Dawn Yip
- Runner-up: Abigail Yeo
- Finals venue: MediaCorp Studios

Release
- Original network: MediaCorp Channel U
- Original release: 18 June – 26 October 2014

Season chronology
- ← Previous; Season 2

The third season of the Singaporean reality talent show Project SuperStar began on 18 August 2014. It was broadcast on MediaCorp Channel U and simulcast on Toggle Live. The show was hosted by Dasmond Koh, with Jeremy Chan and Shane Pow acting as managers for the contestants. Roy Li and Dawn Yip returned as judges for their third season, and they were joined by Eric Ng who appeared as a judge for the first time. Taiwanese singer Tiger Huang and former judge Lee Wei Song served as the guest judges at the grand final.

On 26 October 2014, Alfred Sim the male category winner who was mentored by Dawn Yip, was declared the overall winner of the season; with female category winner Abigail Yeo, also mentored by Dawn Yip named as the overall runner-up. Justin Chua and Tan Yan Hua, both mentored by Eric Ng, were the runners-up of their respective category. Sim received a cash prize of $15,000 and a one-year management contract with Mediacorp, while Yeo was awarded a cash prize of $10,000, and Chua and Tan $2,500 each.

== Judges and hosts ==
The judges were revealed during the round three auditions on 5 July 2014. Billy Koh, Lee Wei Song and Anthony Png, who were the judges for the past two seasons, did not return for their third season. Roy Li and Dawn Yip were the only two judges from the previous seasons to return to the show. They were joined by Eric Ng who was announced as the third and final judge of the season. Despite not returning for his third season, Lee appeared as a guest judge during the grand final, together with Taiwanese singer Tiger Huang.

The season also saw a makeover in the hosting lineup, which was announced on 20 May 2014. Former hosts of the show Quan Yi Fong and Jeff Wang did not return for their third season as well, and were replaced by Dasmond Koh with season two quarter-finalist Jeremy Chan and Shane Pow as the co-hosts.

== Development ==
=== Auditions ===
For the first time in Project Superstar history, the auditions were opened to the public without any restrictions on the age and nationality. For non-Singaporeans or permanent residents, applicants must hold a student pass or work permit that is valid till the end of October 2014, to ensure their stay in Singapore throughout the contest period. Besides removing the age and nationality restrictions from the competition, the show also allowed participants to audition in groups that is made up of not more than five members and the members must be of the same gender. The highlights of the auditions were aired during the premiere of the show on 18 August 2014.

==== Campus auditions ====
The auditions first started in the campus of three local institutions Ngee Ann Polytechnic, Singapore Polytechnic and Temasek Polytechnic on 6, 7 and 19 May 2014 respectively. Only the students and staff of the respective institution were allowed to apply for the campus auditions. The campus auditions were hosted by radio personalities from Y.E.S. 93.3FM, with Chen Ning, Kenneth Chung and Xie Jiafa hosting at the Ngee Ann Polytechnic, Singapore Polytechnic and Temasek Polytechnic auditions respectively. Auditionees who were successful in the campus auditions advanced to the round two auditions.

==== Round one auditions ====
The first round of the auditions began on 7 June 2014 and was held at Caldecott Broadcast Centre. More than 6,000 hopefuls turned up for the auditions at the Caldecott Broadcast Centre. Due to overwhelming response, the audition period for this round of the competition was extended till the following day on 8 June 2014. The second day of the round one auditions was not opened to any new applications and was strictly held for the auditionees who were unable to meet the judges on 7 June 2014 due to time constraints. Successful auditionees from round one auditions advanced to the round two auditions.

==== Round two auditions ====
The second round of the auditions was held on 22 June 2014 at Square 2. 100 contestants each from the male and female category made it to this stage of the competition. From the top 200 contestants who participated in this round of the auditions, the judges narrowed them down to the 80 who progress onto the third and final round of the auditions.

==== Invitations-only auditions ====
The show also held a special invitations-only auditions for local professional singers who were scouted by the producers of the show. The scouted contestants attended the audition on 24 June 2014 at Caldecott Broadcast Centre. Successful auditionees from this round of the competition advanced to the round three auditions.

==== Round three auditions ====
The third and final round of auditions was held on 5 July 2014 at UE Convention Centre. Contestants were required to prepare three different songs to perform for the judges at this stage of the competition, with each of the songs either in karaoke, a capella or piano instrumental version. Among the three songs that were prepared by a contestant, the judges would decide which song they would like to hear and the contestant would have to perform the song on the spot. The final 12 contestants who would advance to the live shows were announced at the end of auditions. Similar to The Voice and The X Factor, each of the judges chose two male and two female contestants from the final 12 to form a team of their own, and then the judges will mentor their respective contestants throughout the competition.

Summary of auditions
Audition	Date(s)	Venue	Judges	Host(s)
Campus	6 May 2014	Ngee Ann Polytechnic	Zhu Xiaoming; Lim Shiong Chiang; Hideaki Koh	Chen Ning
Campus	7 May 2014	Singapore Polytechnic	Hideaki Koh; Jean Toh; Zhu Xiaoming	Kenneth Chung
Campus	19 May 2014	Temasek Polytechnic	Zhu Xiaoming; Tay Lay Tin; Tang Yuxuan	Xie Jiafa
Round one	7–8 June 2014	Caldecott Broadcast Centre	Chan Kim Teck; Canter Chia; Goh Djong Hoa; Hon Sher Ee; Hideaki Koh; Koong Chen Liang; Addy Lee; Sheffie Liang; Lim Shiong Chiang; Kelvin Soon; Peter Tan; Tang Yuxuan; Tay Lay Tin; Theresa Teng; Kerlin Teo; Jean Toh; Wong Eng Hong; Winnie Wong	Jeremy Chan; Dasmond Koh; Shane Pow
Round two	22 June 2014	Square 2	Cavin Soh; Wong Hong Mok; Goh Djong Hoa; Wu Jiaming; Ken Tay	Jeremy Chan; Dasmond Koh; Shane Pow
Invite-only	24 June 2014	Caldecott Broadcast Centre	Wong Hong Mok; Lee Ee Wurn; Roy Li	Jeremy Chan; Dasmond Koh
Round three	5 July 2014	UE Convention Centre	Roy Li; Dawn Yip; Eric Ng	Jeremy Chan; Dasmond Koh; Shane Pow

=== Promotions ===
==== Auditions ====
Three recruitment teasers and one recruitment trailer were released to promote for the campus and first round auditions. The third and final recruitment teaser featured a cameo appearance by MediaCorp artiste Desmond Tan. In addition, promotional videos featuring season one and season two semi-finalists Candyce Toh and Kelvin Soon, former Fahrenheit member Wu Chun, Y.E.S. 93.3FM radio personalities Chen Ning and Kenneth Chung, Taiwanese singer-actress Phoebe Huang, singer Alex Lam and MediaCorp artiste Desmond Tan were released to provide singing and audition tips to the auditionees.

A print advertisement titled "Make Sweet Dreams Come True" were released in both English and Mandarin version to promote for the recruitment.

==== Finalists ====
Profile trailers which introduce the final 12 contestants were released prior to the premiere of the show. The profile trailers were presented in individual and category versions. The final 12 contestants also made appearance in various events or meet-and-greet sessions to promote the show. The details are as follows;

Summary of finalists' promotional events
Event	Date	Venue	Host(s)	Performance details
Top 12 Meet-and-Greet	19 July 2014	Junction 10	Kenneth Chung	Contestant / Order / Song; Abigail Yeo / 1 / "我不是你想像那么勇敢"; Benita Cheng / 2 / "超快感"; Amanda Lee / 3 / "睁一只眼 闭一只眼"; Germaine Ng / 4 / "我爱你"; Jo Wu / 5 / "依然爱你"; Tan Yan Hua / 6 / "终于说出口"; Jayden Chew / 7 / "一千年以后"; Bryan Toro / 8 / "掉了"; See Kai Zheng / 9 / "P.S.我爱你"; Justin Chua / 10 / "想你的夜"; Aedan Kang / 11 / "怎么说我不爱你"; Alfred Sim / 12 / "家乡"
I've Got Style 2014	27 July 2014	ION Orchard	Nico Chua	Contestant / Order / Song; Top 6 Male (except Alfred Sim) / 1 / "新不了情"; Top 6 Female (except Benita Cheng) / 2 / "解脱"
NTU Fest 2014	16 August 2014	The Padang	Gerald Koh; Kimberly Wang	Contestant / Order / Song; Top 12 (except Alfred Sim) / 1 / "Music让我更精彩"; Benita Cheng; Aedan Kang; Germaine Ng; Bryan Toro; Abigail Yeo / 2 / "为你而活"; Jayden Chew; Justin Chua; Amanda Lee; See Kai Zheng; Tan Yan Hua; Jo Wu / 3 / "Just Give Me a Reason"
Singapore Hit Awards 2014 (Nominations Reveal)	5 September 2014	JCube	Christina Lin; Xie Jiafa	Contestant / Order / Song / Nominated artist; Benita Cheng / 1 / "面具" / William Wei; Justin Chua / 2 / "爱爱爱" / Khalil Fong; Aedan Kang / 3 / "只看见妳 " / Aaron Yan; Jayden Chew / 4 / "兄妹" / Eason Chan; See Kai Zheng / 5 / "搞笑" / Show Lo; Alfred Sim / 6 / "我的歌声里" / Wanting Qu; Abigail Yeo / 7 / "我怀念的" / Stefanie Sun; Amanda Lee / 8 / "别找我麻烦" / Tanya Chua; Germaine Ng / 9 / "尘埃" / Jia Jia; Tan Yan Hua / 10 / "寂寞寂寞就好" / Hebe Tien; Note: Each contestant performed songs by nominated artists for Most Popular Male Artiste and Most Popular Female Artiste.
Top 6 Flash Mob	4 October 2014	Outside; Plaza Singapura	—N/a	Contestant / Order / Song; Germaine Ng; Tan Yan Hua / 1 / "我的歌声里"; Justin Chua; Aedan Kang / 2 / "热情的沙漠"; Alfred Sim / 3 / "冰雨"; Abigail Yeo / 4 / "Let It Go"; Top 6 / 5 / "OAOA (丢掉名字性别)"
Top 4 Autograph Session	18 October 2014	Bedok Point	Kenneth Chung	Contestant / Order / Song; Alfred Sim / 1 / N/A; Abigail Yeo / 2 / "我不是你想像那么勇敢"; Tan Yan Hua / 3 / "终于说出口"; Justin Chua / 4 / "我爱你"
Joy Truck Picnic Party	18 October 2014	Dhoby Ghaut Green	Ivy Tan; Xie Jiafa	Contestant / Order / Song; Alfred Sim / 1 / N/A; Abigail Yeo / 2 / "我不是你想像那么勇敢"; Tan Yan Hua / 3 / "P.S.我爱你"; Justin Chua / 4 / "我爱你"

==== Youth Collaboration ====
The Youth Collaboration is an online episodic series that features the finalists of the show, together with four youths who have strong interest in music and performing arts. The series brings the audience through the musical journey of the youths and how it has made a positive influence to their lives. The programme also sees the finalists collaborating with the youths by putting up street performances. The programme, hosted by Chen Ning and Kenneth Chung, is broadcast through Catch-up TV on xinmsn and Toggle Now application.

Summary of Youth Collaboration episodes
Episode	Airdate	Filming date	Venue	Featured youth(s) (featured instrument)	Featured finalists	Host(s)	Performance details
1	26 August 2014	3 August 2014; 10 August 2014	Outside; Ngee Ann City	Shawn Ng (Beatboxing)	Aedan Kang; Bryan Toro; Jo Wu	Chen Ning	Order / Song; 1 / "中国话"; 2 / "明明"
2	29 August 2014	3 August 2014; 10 August 2014	Outside; Ngee Ann City	Shawn Ng (Beatboxing)	Aedan Kang; Bryan Toro; Jo Wu	Chen Ning	Order / Song; 1 / "中国话"; 2 / "明明"
3	4 September 2014	16 August 2014; 29 August 2014	Outside; Ngee Ann City	Desmond Soo (Erhu)	Benita Cheng; Jayden Chew; See Kai Zheng	Chen Ning	Order / Song; 1 / "专属天使"; 2 / "如燕"
4	11 September 2014	16 August 2014; 29 August 2014	Outside; Ngee Ann City	Desmond Soo (Erhu)	Benita Cheng; Jayden Chew; See Kai Zheng	Chen Ning	Order / Song; 1 / "专属天使"; 2 / "如燕"
5	22 September 2014	13 September 2014; 14 September 2014	Outside; Plaza Singapura	Hadi (Ukulele)	Germaine Ng; Alfred Sim; Tan Yan Hua	Kenneth Chung	Order / Song; 1 / "有些男孩不能爱"; 2 / "泪若雨下"
6	22 September 2014	13 September 2014; 14 September 2014	Outside; Plaza Singapura	Hadi (Ukulele)	Germaine Ng; Alfred Sim; Tan Yan Hua	Kenneth Chung	Order / Song; 1 / "有些男孩不能爱"; 2 / "泪若雨下"
7	28 September 2014	28 August 2014; 14 September 2014	Outside; Plaza Singapura	Kaylie Kong (Accordion)	Justin Chua; Amanda Lee; Abigail Yeo	Kenneth Chung	Order / Song; 1 / "坏女孩"; 2 / "珍惜"
8	14 October 2014	28 August 2014; 14 September 2014	Outside; Plaza Singapura	Kaylie Kong (Accordion)	Justin Chua; Amanda Lee; Abigail Yeo	Kenneth Chung	Order / Song; 1 / "坏女孩"; 2 / "珍惜"
9	23 October 2014	6 September 2014	Outside; ION Orchard	All	All	Chen Ning; Kenneth Chung	Order / Song; 1 / "中国话"; 2 / "专属天使"

== Finalists ==
Unlike the previous two seasons, the number of finalists that were chosen to advance to the live shows was reduced from the usual 24 (12 per gender) down to 12 (six per gender). In a format similar to The X Factor and The Voice, in addition to splitting the finalists into their respective gender categories, each judge chose two finalists from each category to form a coaching team of their own to mentor them. The two co-hosts of the show also selected three contestants from each category to act as their managers throughout the competition.

Key:

Key:

– Winner
– Runner-up
– Gender/Category runner-up

Act	Age(s)	Occupation	Gender	Mentor	Coach	Result
Alfred Sim 沈志豪	32	Athletics coach	Male	Dawn Yip	Jeremy Chan	Winner
Abigail Yeo 姚惠珊	18	Student	Female	Dawn Yip	Shane Pow	Runner-up
Justin Chua 蔡宁轩	20	Student	Male	Eric Ng	Jeremy Chan	Category Runner-up
Tan Yan Hua 陈彦桦	22	Student	Female	Eric Ng	Jeremy Chan	Category Runner-up
Aedan Kang 江韩文	29	Technician	Male	Dawn Yip	Shane Pow	Category 3rd place
Germaine Ng 黄歆颐	21	Salesperson	Female	Dawn Yip	Jeremy Chan	Category 3rd place
Amanda Lee 李慧玲	28	Student	Female	Roy Li	Shane Pow	Category 4th place
See Kai Zheng 施凯证	21	Student	Male	Roy Li	Shane Pow	Category 4th place
Benita Cheng 郑善文	21	Freelance performer	Female	Eric Ng	Jeremy Chan	Category 5th place
Jayden Chew 周俊安	26	Performer	Male	Roy Li	Shane Pow	Category 5th place
Bryan Toro 黄家万	24	Musical instructor	Male	Eric Ng	Jeremy Chan	Category 6th place
Jo Wu 吴加欣	26	Student	Female	Roy Li	Shane Pow	Category 6th place

== Live shows ==
The live shows started on 25 August 2014. As with previous seasons, each week's song choices followed a particular theme. Contestants from the male category perform on the even weeks from week two to eight, while the female category contestants perform on the odd from week three to nine. The hour-and-a-half-long live shows would take place on Mondays and would split into two segments. Each contestant performs during the first hour, while guest performances and eliminations take place during the final half hour.

A new interactive viewer component was featured for this season: The method of voting via paid phone calls and text messaging which has been used for the past two seasons of the show was instead replaced by a free-of-charge online voting method via the Toggle Now application. Each contestant would be given a designated voting window during their performance on the show. During the voting window, users of the Toggle Now application would be presented with the "Yes! I vote!" (known as "Yes! I want to vote!" on week two) and "No. I forfeit!" (known as "No, I do wish to vote." on week two) buttons on screen. Every selection of the "Yes! I vote!" button by the viewers would be counted as a vote towards the respective contestant, while the selection of the "No. I forfeit!" button would not make an effect to the vote count. The voting procedure is limited to one vote per contestant per performance per device.

The results were announced based on the accumulated points from the judges and the public's votes. Each of the judges would be able to award points to a contestant after their performance on the show and the total score from the three judges would carry a weightage of 75% for the respective contestant's overall scores. The remaining 25% of the overall score would be based on the public votes received from the Toggle Now application. The contestant who receives the lowest combined score (the judges scores and the public votes) would be eliminated at the end of the show. Contrary to previous seasons of the show, the judges' points were not revealed; the ranking result of the public votes were instead shown to the viewers before the results announcement. Another notable change, the Revival round, a round where singers perform to reinstate them from the competition, did not return this season.

=== Show changes for the grand final ===
The grand final took place on 26 October 2014, Sunday at MediaCorp Studios, with the duration of the show extended to three hours. For the first time in Project SuperStar history, four finalists, up from two, represented in the finale, and the finals was not held at the Singapore Indoor Stadium. The audience were still given the power to vote, but for just one contestant per category after a round of performances using a single device, thus restricting them to vote for both of the remaining contestants from each category for each round of the competition (or both the male category winner and female category winner during the overall winner decider). With the addition of two guest judges, score from each of the judges now carry a 15% weightage for the respective contestant's combined score, amounting to a 75% total. The public vote weightage remained as 25%.

=== Musical guests ===
Each live show featured musical performances from various artists. Season two overall winner Daren Tan performed on the first live show. The second live show featured performance from local singer-songwriter and Sing My Song contestant Ling Kai, while season one overall runner-up Kelly Poon appeared on the third. Local a cappella group and The Sing-Off China runners-up MICappella appeared on the fourth live show, while season two top 16 contestant Jeremy Chan and top 6 finalist Kelvin Soon performed on the fifth and sixth respectively. The Freshman, made up of season two overall runner-up Lydia Tan and female runner-up Carrie Yeo, performed on the seventh live show. The eighth live show featured performances from The Voice of China season two top 12 finalist Bi Xia. The grand final would also feature performances from The Voice of China season three overall third-place finisher Yu Feng and top 16 finalist Li Jiage, as well as guest judge Tiger Huang.

=== Results summary ===
Colour key:

–	Contestant did not perform
–	Contestant was the last to be called safe (results not called on particular order)
–	Contestant received the lowest combined score and was eliminated
–	Contestant received the highest combined score

Weekly results per contestant
Contestant	Week 2	Week 3	Week 4	Week 5	Week 6	Week 7	Week 8	Week 9	Week 11		
Contestant	Week 2	Week 3	Week 4	Week 5	Week 6	Week 7	Week 8	Week 9	Part 1		Part 2
Contestant	Week 2	Week 3	Week 4	Week 5	Week 6	Week 7	Week 8	Week 9	Female	Male	Part 2
Alfred Sim	Safe	—N/a	Safe	—N/a	Safe	—N/a	Safe	—N/a	—N/a	1st	Winner
Abigail Yeo	—N/a	Safe	—N/a	Safe	—N/a	Safe	—N/a	Safe	1st	—N/a	Runner-up
Justin Chua	Safe	—N/a	Safe	—N/a	Safe	—N/a	Safe	—N/a	—N/a	2nd	Eliminated (week 11)
Tan Yan Hua	—N/a	Safe	—N/a	Safe	—N/a	Safe	—N/a	Safe	2nd	Eliminated (week 11)	
Germaine Ng	—N/a	Safe	—N/a	Safe	—N/a	Safe	—N/a	3rd	Eliminated (week 9)		
Aedan Kang	Safe	—N/a	Safe	—N/a	Safe	—N/a	3rd	Eliminated (week 8)			
Amanda Lee	—N/a	Safe	—N/a	Safe	—N/a	4th	Eliminated (week 7)				
See Kai Zheng	Safe	—N/a	Safe	—N/a	4th	Eliminated (week 6)					
Benita Cheng	—N/a	Safe	—N/a	5th	Eliminated (week 5)						
Jayden Chew	Safe	—N/a	5th	Eliminated (week 4)							
Jo Wu	—N/a	6th	Eliminated (week 3)								
Bryan Toro	6th	Eliminated (week 2)									

=== Live show details ===
==== Week 2: Top 6 Male (25 August) ====
- Theme: No theme
- Musical guest: Daren Tan ("走过年少")

Contestants' performances on the first live show
Coach	Manager	Contestant	Order	Song	Result	
Coach	Manager	Contestant	Order	Song	Public vote	Overall
Eric Ng	Jeremy Chan	Bryan Toro	1	"出卖"	6th	Eliminated
Roy Li	Shane Pow	Jayden Chew	2	"我的未来不是梦"	5th	Safe
Dawn Yip	Jeremy Chan	Alfred Sim	3	"如果没有你"	1st	Safe
Roy Li	Shane Pow	See Kai Zheng	4	"美丽"	4th	Last to be called safe
Eric Ng	Jeremy Chan	Justin Chua	5	"同花顺"	2nd	Safe
Dawn Yip	Shane Pow	Aedan Kang	6	"亲爱的小孩"	3rd	Safe

==== Week 3: Top 6 Female (1 September) ====
- Theme: No theme
- Musical guest: Ling Kai ("随机播放")

Contestants' performances on the second live show
Coach	Manager	Contestant	Order	Song	Result	
Coach	Manager	Contestant	Order	Song	Public vote	Overall
Roy Li	Shane Pow	Jo Wu	1	"只怕想家"	6th	Eliminated
Eric Ng	Jeremy Chan	Benita Cheng	2	"寂寞先生"	5th	Safe
Dawn Yip	Shane Pow	Abigail Yeo	3	"如果你也听说"	2nd	Safe
Eric Ng	Jeremy Chan	Tan Yan Hua	4	"失落沙洲"	4th	Last to be called safe
Roy Li	Shane Pow	Amanda Lee	5	"第一天"	3rd	Safe
Dawn Yip	Jeremy Chan	Germaine Ng	6	"分手需要练习的"	1st	Safe

==== Week 4: Top 5 Male (8 September) ====
- Theme: Songs for their loved ones
- Musical guest: Kelly Poon ("情人")

Though it was not specifically mentioned on the show as the week's theme, each contestant performed a song as a dedication to their loved ones. Beginning this week, only a selected contestants (regardless of the overall placement) are immediately declared safe during the results, leaving the rest to have their results announced via the traditional computerized system; those contestants who were declared safe via this manner are highlighted in blue.

Contestants' performances on the third live show
Coach	Manager	Contestant	Order	Song	Result	
Coach	Manager	Contestant	Order	Song	Public vote	Overall
Dawn Yip	Shane Pow	Aedan Kang	1	"袖手旁观"	5th	Last to be called safe
Roy Li	Shane Pow	See Kai Zheng	2	"天天想你"	3rd	Last to be called safe
Eric Ng	Jeremy Chan	Justin Chua	3	"时间都去哪了"	4th	Safe
Dawn Yip	Jeremy Chan	Alfred Sim	4	"我愿意"	1st	Safe
Roy Li	Shane Pow	Jayden Chew	5	"没离开过"	2nd	Eliminated

==== Week 5: Top 5 Female (15 September) ====
- Theme: Songs for their loved ones
- Musical guest: MICappella ("伤心的人别听慢歌(贯彻快乐)")

As in previous week, each contestant performed a song as a dedication to their loved ones, and during the results, only the selected artists which gone through by a computer system and declared as safe are highlighted in blue.

Contestants' performances on the fourth live show
Coach	Manager	Contestant	Order	Song	Result	
Coach	Manager	Contestant	Order	Song	Public vote	Overall
Dawn Yip	Jeremy Chan	Germaine Ng	1	"认错"	4th	Last to be called safe
Eric Ng	Jeremy Chan	Tan Yan Hua	2	"潇洒走一回"	3rd	Safe
Dawn Yip	Shane Pow	Abigail Yeo	3	"失恋无罪"	1st	Safe
Eric Ng	Jeremy Chan	Benita Cheng	4	"特别的爱给特别的你"	5th	Eliminated
Roy Li	Shane Pow	Amanda Lee	5	"幸福的地图"	2nd	Last to be called safe

==== Week 6: Top 4 Male (22 September) ====
- Theme: Medley challenge
- Musical guest: Jeremy Chan ("海芋恋")

It was revealed by judge Roy Li on week five's live show that the contestants would be singing a medley of songs for their performances this week. The contestants started off their performances with a ballad, followed by an uptempo song. As such for the Top 5 rounds, only the selected artists which had their results revealed as safe by a computer are highlighted in blue.

Contestants' performances on the fifth live show
Coach	Manager	Contestant	Order	Song	Result	
Coach	Manager	Contestant	Order	Song	Public vote	Overall
Roy Li	Shane Pow	See Kai Zheng	1	"爱你的宿命" / "我爱你"	4th	Eliminated
Dawn Yip	Jeremy Chan	Alfred Sim	2	"What a Wonderful World" / "热情的沙漠"	1st	Safe
Eric Ng	Jeremy Chan	Justin Chua	3	"Listen" / "无乐不作"	3rd	Last to be called safe
Dawn Yip	Shane Pow	Aedan Kang	4	"我要快乐?" / "永远不回头"	2nd	Safe

==== Week 7: Top 4 Female (29 September) ====
- Theme: Medley challenge
- Musical guest: Kelvin Soon ("大城小爱")

Similar to the previous week, the contestants sang a medley of songs for their performances this week. The contestants started off their performances with a ballad, followed by an uptempo song. Similar to the results for the fourth consecutive week, two contestants faced results via a computerized system, with the contestant declaring safe was highlighted in blue. With the elimination of Amanda Lee, Roy Li no longer has any contestants left on his coaching team.

Contestants' performances on the sixth live show
Coach	Manager	Contestant	Order	Song	Result	
Coach	Manager	Contestant	Order	Song	Public vote	Overall
Roy Li	Shane Pow	Amanda Lee	1	"Beautiful Love" / "Mr. Q"	4th	Eliminated
Dawn Yip	Jeremy Chan	Germaine Ng	2	"爱如潮水" / "3-7-20-1"	1st	Last to be called safe
Dawn Yip	Shane Pow	Abigail Yeo	3	"Halo" / "三天三夜"	3rd	Safe
Eric Ng	Jeremy Chan	Tan Yan Hua	4	"我爱他" / "Rolling in the Deep"	2nd	Last to be called safe

==== Week 8: Top 3 Male (6 October) ====
- Themes: Judges' choice; contestant's choice
- Musical guest: The Freshman ("眼镜蒙蒙的" / "眼镜找朋友" and "逞强")

For the first time this season, the contestants performed two songs each; one chosen by the judges (composed by either judge Roy Li or Eric Ng), and another selected on their own. The viewers were also able to cast up to two votes (one for each performance) for each contestant using a single device, as opposed to one vote per contestant per device in the previous weeks.

Contestants' performances on the seventh live show
Coach	Manager	Contestant	Order	First song	Order	Second song	Result	
Coach	Manager	Contestant	Order	First song	Order	Second song	Public vote	Overall
Dawn Yip	Jeremy Chan	Alfred Sim	1	"心如刀割"	4	"那个男人"	2nd	Last to be called safe
Dawn Yip	Shane Pow	Aedan Kang	2	"复制人"	5	"你快回来"	3rd	Eliminated
Eric Ng	Jeremy Chan	Justin Chua	3	"下雪"	6	"虽然我愿意"	1st	Safe

==== Week 9: Top 3 Female (13 October) ====
- Themes: Judges' choice; contestant's choice
- Musical guest: Bi Xia ("像梦一样自由" and "大闹天宫")

Similar to the previous week, the contestants performed two songs each; one chosen by the judges (composed by either judge Roy Li or Eric Ng), and another selected on their own. The viewers were also able to cast up to two votes (one for each performance) for each contestant using a single device, as opposed to one vote per contestant per device in the previous weeks. For the first time in the show's history, a contestant sang her own original song instead of a cover version of a song by another recording artist.

Contestants' performances on the eighth live show
Coach	Manager	Contestant	Order	First song	Order	Second song	Result	
Coach	Manager	Contestant	Order	First song	Order	Second song	Public vote	Overall
Eric Ng	Jeremy Chan	Tan Yan Hua	1	"第三者"	4	"你把我灌醉"	3rd	Last to be called safe
Dawn Yip	Shane Pow	Abigail Yeo	2	"爱. 无力"	5	"如果我不是那种女生"	2nd	Safe
Dawn Yip	Jeremy Chan	Germaine Ng	3	"无底洞"	6	"对的人"	1st	Eliminated

==== Week 10: Grand Final Prelude (20 October) ====
The top 12 finalists, together with the judges and managers, returned on this special grand final prelude episode to share about their experience on the show and how the top 4 finalists were preparing for the grand final. The episode was pre-recorded and did not feature any interactive viewer component.

A sing-off segment was included on the show for the eight eliminated finalists. Each of them performed a solo song of their choice, with the judges and the top 4 finalists deciding on the best performer from each category. The two winners of the sing-off, which were given the title "King of Sing-Off" and "Queen of Sing-Off", were awarded with an Eversoft-sponsored gift pack worth over $120 and the opportunity to perform solo during the grand final opening group performance.

Contestants' performances on the ninth pre-recorded show
Coach	Manager	Contestant	Order	Song	Result
Female category
Roy Li	Shane Pow	Amanda Lee	1	"绿光"	Lost sing-off
Dawn Yip	Jeremy Chan	Germaine Ng	2	"他不爱我"	Lost sing-off
Roy Li	Shane Pow	Jo Wu	3	"黑白灰"	Lost sing-off
Eric Ng	Jeremy Chan	Benita Cheng	4	"相爱后动物感伤"	Queen of Sing-Off
Male category
Eric Ng	Jeremy Chan	Bryan Toro	1	"春泥"	Lost sing-off
Roy Li	Shane Pow	See Kai Zheng	2	"落叶归根"	Lost sing-off
Roy Li	Shane Pow	Jayden Chew	3	"阳光宅男"	King of Sing-Off
Dawn Yip	Shane Pow	Aedan Kang	4	"狂想曲"	Lost sing-off

The Marigold Peel Fresh Refreshing Award (a cash prize of $1,000 and a gift pack worth $220) was also given out during the show, with the top 12 finalists voting for the winner who possesses a personality of "sunshine", "liveliness" and "youthfulness"; the award was won by Amanda Lee.

==== Week 11: Grand Final (26 October) ====
Taiwanese singer Tiger Huang and former judge Lee Wei Song were brought in as the guest judges for the grand final. For the first time this season, the contestants performed with a live band, instead of a backing track. In addition, the percentages of the public votes received by the contestants for their respective round of performances were revealed on the Toggle Now application.

Part 1
Category winner decider

- Themes: Category finalists duets; medley challenge
- Group performance: "我相信" / "OAOA (丢掉名字性别)" / "我的歌声里" (all finalists except Justin Chua, Alfred Sim, Tan Yan Hua and Abigail Yeo; with Roy Li, Eric Ng and Dawn Yip)
- Musical guests: Li Jiage ("普通朋友") and Yu Feng ("有多少爱可以重来")

The two remaining contestants from each category first paired up to perform a duet, then each performed a medley of songs – a ballad and an uptempo song with backup dancers. For the first round, the contestant's prefixes are either "M" (for male category) or "F" (for female category); the contestant (of the respective category) who received a higher combined total was crowned as the category winner and moved on to the overall winner decider; the other will be named as the category runner-up and is eliminated.

With the eliminations of Justin Chua and Tan Yan Hua, Eric Ng no longer have any remaining contestants on his team, thus Dawn Yip was guaranteed to be the winning coach by default.

Contestants' performances on the tenth live show – category winner decider
Coach	Manager	Contestant	Order	First song (duet)	Public vote %	Order	Second song	Public vote %	Result	
Coach	Manager	Contestant	Order	First song (duet)	Public vote %	Order	Second song	Public vote %	Public vote	Overall
Female category
Eric Ng	Jeremy Chan	Tan Yan Hua	1	"至少还有你" (with Abigail Yeo)	50%	3	"靠近" / "孤单芭蕾"	50%	1st	Runner-up
Dawn Yip	Shane Pow	Abigail Yeo	2	"至少还有你" (with Tan Yan Hua)	50%	4	"天使的指纹" / "日不落"	50%	2nd	Winner
Male category
Eric Ng	Jeremy Chan	Justin Chua	1	"城里的月光" (with Alfred Sim)	51%	3	"代替" / "离开地球表面"	42%	2nd	Runner-up
Dawn Yip	Jeremy Chan	Alfred Sim	2	"城里的月光" (with Justin Chua)	49%	4	"征服" / "北京一夜"	58%	1st	Winner

Part 2
Overall winner decider

- Themes: Category winners duet; winner's song
- Musical guest: Tiger Huang ("我的心里只有你没有他" and "没那么简单")

The two category winners paired up to perform a duet, then each gave a solo performance of their potential winner's song. For this round, the contestant's prefixes are changed to "S", unlike other shows where it retained the "M" or "F" prefixes; the contestant who received a higher combined total (separate from the previous round's scores) was crowned as the overall winner. It was later revealed Sim received 56% of the judges' votes during the round, while Yeo garnered the remaining 44%.

Contestants' performances on the tenth live show – overall winner decider
Coach	Manager	Contestant	Order	First song (duet)	Public vote %	Order	Second song	Public vote %	Result	
Coach	Manager	Contestant	Order	First song (duet)	Public vote %	Order	Second song	Public vote %	Public vote	Overall
Dawn Yip	Shane Pow	Abigail Yeo	1	"一眼瞬间" (with Alfred Sim)	43%	3	"存在"	48%	2nd	Runner-up
Dawn Yip	Jeremy Chan	Alfred Sim	2	"一眼瞬间" (with Abigail Yeo)	57%	4	"听海"	52%	1st	Winner

== Contestants' appearances on earlier talent shows ==
- Benita Cheng and Abigail Yeo participated in the third season of Campus SuperStar. Cheng finished in eighth place while Yeo did not pass the first round of the auditions. Yeo then auditioned for the fourth season of the show but was later disqualified as she was about to admit into a polytechnic (the competition was only opened to students who were studying in secondary schools, junior colleges and institutes of technical education).
- Alfred Sim auditioned for the first and second season of Project SuperStar, but failed to advance to the live shows.
- Cheng, Justin Chua and Yeo appeared on Power Duet as part of the duos Dong Bei Xian, Juxtapose and Po Yin respectively. Cheng was eliminated in the quarter-final, finishing in ninth place. Chua and Yeo reached the semi-final and finished in seventh and eighth place respectively.
- Germaine Ng appeared on the seventh season of One Million Star as one of the top 78 contestants, but did not make it past the preliminary round.
- Jayden Chew was a contestant on Taiwanese reality television singing competition Ming Ri Zhi Xing Super Star.
- See Kai Zheng appeared on Sing a Nation as one of the members of the singing group Xplosions, but was eliminated on the third week and failed to make it as one of the final three.

== Reception ==
The grand final episode attracted a viewership of 591,000.
