= Heart of the World =

Heart of the World may refer to:

- Heart of the World (novel), an 1895 fantasy novel by H. Rider Haggard
- Heart of the World (1952 film), a West German drama film
- Heart of the World (2018 film), a Russian-Lithuanian drama film
- The Heart of the World, a 2000 short film made by Guy Madden for the Toronto Film Festival
- The Heart of the World (book), a 1990 book by Alan Ereira
- Hearts of the World, a 1918 wartime propaganda film directed by D. W. Griffith
- In the Heart of the World, the second album by singer Kelly Poon
- "Heart of the World", a song by Big Country (1990)
- Heart of the World, a song on Lady Antebellum's third studio album, Own the Night

== See also ==
- Heart (disambiguation)
- World (disambiguation)
