= Ling Kai =

Singaporean singer-songwriter

- Born: 26 October 1986 (age 40); Singapore
- Occupation: Singer-songwriter
- Years active: 2008–present
- Musical career
- Origin: Singapore
- Genres: Alternative Rock, Folk, Pop
- Instrument: Vocals
- Labels: Lempicka Records (2009–2010); Wise Entertainment (2013–2015); Cross Ratio Entertainment (2017–present)
- Website: http://lingkaimusic.co/

Ng Ling Kai (simplified Chinese: 铃凯; traditional Chinese: 鈴凱; pinyin: Líng Kǎi; born 26 October 1986), is a bilingual Singaporean singer-songwriter. She won the Indie Artist Of The Year at YinYueTai 2nd Annual V Chart Awards in Beijing.

== Biography ==
Ling Kai was born in Singapore in 1986. Her father is a Singaporean shipping logistics manager, and her mother is a housewife. She has a brother and a sister.

When she was in Victoria Junior College, she excelled in literature in English, and poetry in particular, and completed Special paper for Literature in English at A levels.

She holds a Bachelor's in Communications from the Nanyang Technological University Wee Kim Wee School of Communications. During her time in university, she was inspired by Philip Larkin's poem "Sad Steps" and wrote "Larkin Step" in 2007 while recovering from a kneecap injury. She posted a grainy YouTube video of her playing her song on Youtube.

The song got over 1 million views on YouTube. overnight when it was published.

== Music career ==
After Ling Kai uploaded her first original song which is "Larkin Step" on YouTube, the video achieved more than one million views. Ling Kai released her first English language EP "Honestly" in 2009 with Australian indie label Lempicka Records and toured around Brisbane.

On 23 July 2011, Ling Kai performed at Singapore Heritage Festival, one of the song that she performed is her original song titled Growing Old.

In September 2012, Ling Kai was invited by YinYueTai which is one of the major music video sharing sites in China to attend FUJI ROCK FESTIVAL as a special host in Japan. At the same time, Ling Kai took part in a major music programme, Red Bull Singer-songwriter contest 《红牛新能量音乐计划2012成长纪》 in China.

Back in Singapore performing for Mosaic Music Festival 2011 at the Esplanade, Lee Shih Song chanced upon the outdoor public performance of Ling Kai and her experimental band Ling and the Kings, and signed her under his Beijing-based label, Wise Entertainment. They produced Ling Kai's first bilingual and full-length album "LinK", which was released in 2013 in Beijing, Malaysia, and Singapore and featured "Larkin Step" as well as several new works. After Ling Kai released her first album《LinK》, she did her live showcase in various regions of the world including Singapore, Malaysia and China.

In 2014, Ling Kai was invited to compete on Chinese reality TV singing show Sing My Song 《中国好歌曲》which aired on CCTV. She appeared as the only one Singaporean and the only female singer-songwriter candidate to make it to the finals, and she was mentored by singer-songwriter Tanya Chua.

On 15 April 2014, Ling Kai attended YinYueTai 2nd Annual V Chart Awards at 10,000 seater Mastercard Center Wukesong in Beijing. She won Best Singer Songwriter 2013. She performed with Chinese artistes Li Rong Hao, Cui Long Yang 崔龙阳 and Liang Xiao Xue 梁晓雪 during the show.

On 1 September 2014, Ling Kai was invited as the musical guest for Project Superstar Season 3. She performed "随机播放" which from her new album "LinK" in Project Super Star Week 3.

In year 2014, Ling Kai was nominated as the best newcomer in YES 933 Singapore Hit Awards 2014. Other than that, Ling Kai won SPH Media Award - Best New Artiste from Singapore E-Awards.

On 18 June 2016, Ling Kai was invited to perform at "AL!VE SINGAPORE" 2016 which is presented by IMC live. It is a charity concert featuring 13 music acts from Singapore and one guest performer from Hong Kong.

On 27 August 2016, Ling Kai performed with Diya from the Freshmen as a duet at Singapore Rhapsodies - The Concert 2016.

On 5 August 2017, Ling Kai performed in the SKETCHERS Sundown Festival 2017.

On 5 October 2017, Ling Kai held her 3rd EP "Unlearn" Launch Party with a live showcase.

On 4 November 2017, Ling Kai was part of the lineup for Starker Music Carnival 2017, headlined by Taiwanese vocal powerhouse, A-Lin.

== TV appearance and live performances ==
=== TV appearances ===
- Ling Kai appeared on CCTV-3 for a singing competition which is《Sing My Song》中国好歌曲.
- On 12 April 2014, Ling Kai attended 《Global Chinese Music Charts》which was live broadcasting on CCTV-15 Music Channel.
- On 15 April 2014, Ling Kai attended YinYueTai 2nd Annual V Chart Awards at 10,000 seater Mastercard centre Wukesong in Beijing.
- On 1 September 2014, Ling Kai was invited by Project Superstar to be the musical guest in Episode 3 of Project Superstar.

=== Live performance ===
- In Jan 2010, Ling Kai performed at different Starbucks in Singapore to promote her first EP 《Honestly》.
- On 23 July 2011, Ling Kai performed two songs at Singapore Heritage Festival.
- On 3 April 2014, Ling Kai went for Sound Of The Xity (SOTX) Music Festival in Beijing, China. This is her first live show following her TV appearance on Sing My Song.
- On 18 June 2016, Ling Kai was invited to perform at "AL!VE SINGAPORE" 2016 which is presented by IMC live. It is a charity concert featuring 13 music acts from Singapore and one guest performer from Hong Kong.
- On 27 August 2016, Ling Kai performed with Diya as a duet at Singapore Rhapsodies - The Concert 2016.
- On 5 August 2017, Ling Kai performed in the SKETCHERS Sundown Festival 2017.
- On 5 October 2017, Ling Kai held her EP "Unlearn" Launch Party with a live showcase.
- On 4 November 2017, Ling Kai was part of the lineup for Starker Music Carnival 2017 which headlined Taiwanese vocal powerhouse, A-Lin.
- On 19 January 2018, Ling Kai performed at the Singapore Chinese Cultural Centre TGIF Music Station.

== Discography ==
=== EP ===
Year	Album title	Label	Track listing
2009	Honestly	Lempicka Records	1. Facebook Photograph; 2. 8am 3. Suburbia; 4. Midas Matches; 5. Larkin Step; 6. Distraction
2017	本能 Unlearn	Cross Ratio Entertainment	1. 目瞪口呆; 2. 吃喝拉撒; 3. 狼来了; 4. 本能; 5. 十八

=== Album ===
Album	Information	Track listing
LinK	LinK: Release date: 27 September 2013; Language: Chinese; Label: Wise Entertainment Pte. Ltd.	1. Little World; 2. Lost & Found; 3. Facing the Sun; 4. 偶然; 5. 找回; 6. 起点; 7. 遗失的冒险; 8. 爱不释手; 9. Larkin Step; 10. 随机播放

== Awards and nominations ==
Organisation	Year	Category	Nominated work	Result	Ref.
YinYueTai 2nd Annual V Chart Awards	2014	Indie Artist Of The Year	Won		
YES 933 Singapore Hit Awards 2014	2014	Best Newcomer	Nominated		
Singapore E-Awards e乐大赏	2014	SPH Media Award - Best New Artiste (Female)	Won		
Star Awards	2019	Best Theme Song	守护你的善良 (You Can Be An Angel 3)	Nominated	
Star Awards	2021	Best Theme Song	Won		
