= Derrick Hoh =

Singaporean singer (born 1985)

- Born: 17 September 1985 (age 40); Singapore
- Education: Ngee Ann Polytechnic
- Occupations: Singer; songwriter; actor
- Years active: 2005–present
- Spouse: "Jellies" (m. 2020)
- Children: 1
- Musical career
- Genres: Pop; Mandopop
- Instruments: Drums; guitar; piano
- Labels: Warner Music (2008–2012); Gold Typhoon (Taiwan; 2012); Mode Entertainment (Singapore; 2012-2019); Cross Ratio Entertainment (Singapore; 2020-present)

Chinese name
- Traditional Chinese: 何維健
- Simplified Chinese: 何維健
- Hanyu Pinyin: Hé Wéijiàn
- Website: www.derrickhoh.net

Derrick Hoh Wei Jian (born 17 September 1985) is a Singaporean singer and songwriter who is active in the Chinese Mandopop scene. He gained nationwide recognition after emerging as the second runner up in Channel U's Project SuperStar in 2005.

He started his career with Warner Music Singapore and established himself as a professional singer-songwriter with 3 Mandarin albums, 1 English EP, and multiple chart topping singles. He is the first Singaporean artiste to achieve #1 on Singapore iTunes Store with his own composition, and achieving a total of 21 million YouTube views for his songs.

Hoh also received awards including the Mnet Asia Music Awards for Best Asian Artiste in Singapore and multiple Top 20 Songs in the Global Chinese Music Awards.

== Career ==
In April 2005, Hoh auditioned for Project SuperStar, a nationwide talent competition in Singapore organised by Mediacorp.

Judges noticed Hoh's unique singing abilities and Derrick successfully made it through to the finalist round. Hoh gained nationwide recognition when he emerged male second runner-up in the 2005 talent competition Project SuperStar. Derrick was managed by Play Music (presently Warner Music Singapore).

Hoh took a break from the entertainment industry for two years to serve in national service. In 2008, Hoh returned with his debut album Unclassified.

In December 2010, he released his second album Change.

In July 2022, Hoh held his full fledged Here As I Am concert in Singapore.

== Personal life ==
On 1 April 2020, Hoh announced his marriage to a digital marketing manager, whom he refers to as “Jellies” without revealing her real identity. Their wedding was held on 22 February 2020. He accompanied the marriage news with the release of a single titled "I Found You". Their daughter, nicknamed Nori, was born in August 2022.

== Discography ==
Since his debut in 2008, Hoh has released 18 singles and 4 albums:

=== Studio albums ===
Album #	Album Information
1.1	Unclassified - Debut 無法歸類: Released: 30 July 2008 (Singapore) 6 November 2008 (Malaysia); Language: Mandarin Chinese; Label: Warner Music; Genre: Mandopop
1.2	Unclassified - Debut 無法歸類 – 慶功改版: Released: 23 September 2008 (Singapore); Language: Mandarin Chinese; Label: Warner Music; Genre: Mandopop
1.3	Unclassified - Debut 新生何維健: Released: 21 November 2008 (Taiwan); Language: Mandarin Chinese; Label: Warner Music; Genre: Mandopop
1.4	Unclassified - Debut 無法歸類 – 很想你 (終極改版): Released: 26 December 2008 (Singapore); Language: Mandarin Chinese; Label: Warner Music; Genre: Mandopop
2.1	Change？ 變化: Released: (Taiwan); Released: 17 December 2010 (Taiwan and Hong Kong) 23 December 2010 (Singapore and Malaysia); Language: Mandarin Chinese; Label: Warner Music Singapore, Gold Typhoon; Genre: Mandopop
3.1	Forever: Released: (Singapore); Released: 28 January 2014 (Singapore); Language: English; Label: Warner Music Singapore, Mode Entertainment; Genre: Pop
4.1	Lemon Tree 檸檬甜甜的: Released: (Taiwan); Released: 2 November 2015; Language: Mandarin Chinese; Label: Mode Entertainment; Genre: Mandopop

=== Singles ===
Single #	Single Information
1	天空: Released: September 2005 (Singapore); From Album: Best of 絕對Superstar; Language: Mandarin Chinese; Label: Warner Music; Genre: Mandopop
2	讓我陪著你: Released: 2007 (Singapore); From Album: 排行榜總冠軍 Best Of #1 Hits 2007; Language: Mandarin Chinese; Label: Warner Music; Genre: Mandopop
3	很想你: Released: December 2008 (Singapore); From Album: Unclassified - Debut 無法歸類 – 終極改版; Language: Mandarin Chinese; Label: Warner Music; Genre: Pop
4	Open Happiness with (Jocie Guo): Released: July 2009 (Singapore); From Album: none; Language: English; Label: Warner Music; Genre: Pop
5	變化: Released: February 2010 (Singapore); From Album: none; Language: Mandarin Chinese; Label: Warner Music; Genre: Pop
6	Refresh.Rise.Roar; Coca-Cola's Youth Olympic Games 2010 Theme Song: Released: July 2010 (Singapore); From Album: none; Language: English; Label: Warner Music; Genre: Pop
7	Refresh.Rise.Roar (Mandarin Version); Coca-Cola's Youth Olympic Games 2010 Theme Song: Released: August 2010 (Singapore); From Album: N/A; Language: Mandarin Chinese; Label: Warner Music; Genre: Pop
8	每時每刻: Released: June 2011 (Singapore); From Album: Change (Derrick Hoh Album) 變化; Language: Mandarin Chinese; Label: Play Music, Warner Music; Genre: Pop
9	Forever: Released: 2013; From Album: N/A; Language: English; Label: Warner Music; Genre: Pop
10	Show Me What I've Been Looking For: Released: 2013; From Album: N/A; Language: English; Label: Warner Music; Genre: Pop
11	柠檬甜甜的: Released: 2015; From Album: Lemon Tree 檸檬甜甜的; Language: Mandarin Chinese; Label: Mode Entertainment; Genre: Pop
12	假裝不了: Released: 2015; From Album: Lemon Tree 檸檬甜甜的; Language: Mandarin Chinese; Label: Mode Entertainment; Genre: Pop
13	為夢想閃耀; Mediacorp Channel 8 series 夢想程式 Dream Coder Theme Song: Released: 2017; From Album: N/A; Language: Mandarin Chinese; Label: Mode Entertainment; Genre: Pop
14	換我愛你 Mediacorp Channel 8 series 入侵者 Doppelganger Sub-Theme Song: Released: 2018; From Album: N/A; Language: Mandarin Chinese; Label: Mode Entertainment; Genre: Pop
15	说散就散（合唱版）: Released: 2018; From Album: N/A; Language: Mandarin Chinese; Label: Mode Entertainment; Genre: Pop
16	Like You（中文版）: Released: 2018; From Album: N/A; Language: Mandarin Chinese; Label: Flyta Records; Genre: Pop
17	情非得已（电音版）: Released: 2018; From Album: N/A; Language: Mandarin Chinese; Label: Flyta Records; Genre: Pop
18	找到你: Released: 2020; From Album: N/A; Language: Mandarin Chinese; Label: Moogo Studios; Genre: Pop
19	我還是我: Released: 2020; From Album: N/A; Language: Mandarin Chinese; Label: Cross Ratio Entertainment; Genre: Pop

=== Songwriting credits ===
==== As Composer ====
- "BMG - Be My Girl" by Keung To and Anson Lo (2019)

== Filmography ==
=== Music video appearances ===
- Amber Kuo, I amber 愛異想, 《你在，不在》(2009)
- Jocie Guo, 我是郭美美, 《和我來電》(2010)

=== Television series ===
- IRock
- 親愛的九月 Dear DJ
- The Cutting Edge

=== Radio hosting ===
- YES 933 午刻乐乐 (with Chen Ning and Siau Jiahui; 2016)

== Awards and nominations ==
=== Star Awards ===
Year	Award	Category	Nominated work	Result
2013	Star Awards 2013	Best Theme Song	"轧"	Nominated
2018	Star Awards 2018	Best Theme Song	"为梦想闪耀"	Nominated

=== Awards ===
Global Chinese Music Awards 全球華語榜）年度新加坡傑出歌手 2011 Global Chinese Music Awards 全球華語榜）年度20大金曲 2011

- (Singapore Hit Awards) 最有潛力本地新人 2008 {Most Potential New Artiste Award}(Singapore)
- (Singapore Hit Awards) 最酷造型獎 2008 {Most Stylish Artiste Award}(Singapore)
- (Singapore e-Awards) 最佳本地新人 2009 {Best New Artiste Award}(Singapore)
- (Singapore e-Awards) 人氣本地歌手 2011 {Most Popular Singapore Artiste Award}(Singapore)
- (新城國語力頒獎禮) 新城國語力新勢力歌手 2011 (Hong Kong)
- (Global Chinese Music Awards) Top 20 Song of the Year － 當我知道你們相愛 2011 (Global)
- (Global Chinese Music Awards) Singapore Most Outstanding Singer 2011 (Global)
- (17th Singapore Hit Awards) 最受歡迎男歌手 {Most Popular Male Artiste} (Singapore)
- (17th Singapore Hit Awards) Bioskin最佳造型獎 {Bioskin Most Stylish Award} (Singapore)
- (TVB8金曲榜頒獎典禮2011) TVB8金曲榜最佳唱作歌手獎 （銅獎） {TVB8 Music Award - Best Singer-songwriter Award (Bronze)} (Hong Kong)
- (雪碧音樂榜|Sprite Music Awards) 最佳新人獎 Best Newcomer Award 2012
- (2013 Mnet Asian Music Awards) Best Asian Artist – Singapore (Asia)
- (Global Chinese Music Awards) 2013 區域傑出歌手獎 - 新加坡 {2013 Most Outstanding Artiste - Singapore}(Global)
- (18th Singapore Hit Awards) 年度飛躍歌手獎 {Breakthrough Award}(Singapore)
- Teens Role Model Award (Singapore)

=== Achievements ===
- (Mediacorp) Project Superstar Male 2nd Runner-up 2005 (Singapore)
- (Lianhe Zaobao) Asia Top 50 Idols Rank 12 2005 (Singapore)
- (YES 933) Top 20 Charts, Top 10 Male Artistes – 1st Season 2006 (Singapore)
- (YES 933) Top 20 Charts, 無法歸類 No. 1 Song, 7 September 2009 (Singapore)
- (The Straits Times) 30 Most Outstanding Singaporeans under 30 2009 (Singapore)
- (YES 933) Top 20 Charts, 你走天橋我走地下道 No. 3 Song – 4th Season 2009 (Singapore)
- (YES 933) Top 20 Charts, No. 3 Male Artiste – 4th Season 2009 (Singapore)
- (YES 933) Top 20 Charts, No. 10 Male Artiste – All Season 2009 (Singapore)
- (YouTube) No. 18 – Most Subscribed (All Time) – Musicians – 2009 (Taiwan)
- (YouTube) No. 47 – Most Viewed (All Time) – Musicians – 2009 (Taiwan)
- Taiwan G-Music Best-Selling Albums Chart – Peak # 6 – 2009
- Singapore Best-Selling Albums Chart (HMV) – Peak # 1 – 2008
- Singapore Best-Selling Albums Chart (CDRAMA) – Peak # 1 – 2008/2009
- (YES 933) Top 20 Charts, 找到你 No. 1 Song 2020 (Singapore)
- (YES 933) Top 20 Charts, 我還是我 No. 7 Song 2022 (Singapore)
