= SuperBand =

- Presented by: Belinda Lee (2006); Charlyn Lin (2006); Milk (2006); Jeff Wang (2006); Tang Lingyi (2008); Dasmond Koh (2008); Christina Lin (2008)
- Judges: Dennis Chew (2006); Billy Koh (2006); Lee Ee Wurn (2006); Lee Shih Shiong (2006); Anthony Bao (2008); Kenn O (2008); Cavin Soh (2008)
- Country of origin: Singapore
- No. of seasons: 2

Production
- Production company: MediaCorp Studios

Original release
- Network: MediaCorp Channel U
- Release: April 10, 2006 – October 5, 2008

SuperBand (Chinese: 非常SuperBand) is a spin-off of Project SuperStar, a popular singing talent-search competition in Singapore. Contestants are bands of 2 to 6 people.

To mark the opening of the first season, a special SuperBand Big Jam where all the 18 bands made their debut at Suntec City's Fountain of Wealth, and was aired as a special at 8:45 pm on April 9, 2006. After which, the show was broadcast at 7:30 pm on Monday starting from April 10, 2006 for the first 4 episodes of Season 1. Subsequent episodes were aired at 8:00 pm The results show were aired 'live' at 11:30 pm on MediaCorp Channel U. For Season 2, all shows were on Monday at 8:00 pm from June 16, 2008 with the results show delayed at 11:30 pm after an earlier recording at about 10:00 pm An exception was on August 18, 2008, when the main show was aired at 7:00 pm due to the telecast of the National Day Rally's English speech at 8:00 pm The band with the lowest overall scores would be eliminated every week. The scores are determined by judges' scores (50%) and by audience voting (50%).

The judges for Season 1 were Y.E.S. 93.3FM DJ Dennis Chew, Producer Li Yi Wen, Billy Koh and Li Si Song. The hosts were Milk, Jeff Wang, Belinda Lee and SuperHost champion Charlyn Lin.

In season 2, the judges are Bao Xiao Song, Jiu Jian and Cavin Soh. The hosts were Dasmond Koh and Y.E.S. 93.3FM DJ Lin Peifen. Tang Ling Yi also served as host but only on the first episode of the results show, after she requested to venture in the entertainment industry outside of Singapore.

== Season 1 ==
SuperBand
- Season 1
- Hosted by: Belinda Lee; Charlyn Lin; Milk; Jeff Wang
- Judges: Dennis Chew; Billy Koh; Lee Ee Wurn; Lee Shih Shiong
- Winner: Mi Lu Bing
- Runner-up: Soul
- Finals venue: Singapore Indoor Stadium

Release
- Original network: MediaCorp
- Original release: April 10 – August 5, 2006

Season 1 was broadcast from April 10 to August 5, 2006.

All bands competed every week at 7.30 pm on Monday for the first 4 episodes of Season 1. Subsequent episodes were aired at 8 pm. The results show were aired 'live' at 11.30 pm on MediaCorp Channel U. The band with the lowest score is eliminated. The grand final was held on August 5, 2006 at 7.30 pm at the Singapore Indoor Stadium in a 3.5 hour finale.

The table below shows a summary of all the 18 finalists in Season 1. Mi Lu Bing beat Soul in the final round 65% to 35% to win the inaugural SuperBand.

English Name	Chinese Name	No. of members	Order Of Elimination
Mi Lu Bing	迷路兵	3	Champion
Soul		5	Runner-Up Eliminated 5 August 2006
Lucify		5	Eliminated 5 August 2006 Revived 22 May 2006 Eliminated 15 May 2006
J3		3	Eliminated 5 August 2006
Brods		2	Eliminated 17 July 2006
Man Tou	馒头	5	Eliminated 10 July 2006
QI:NOBE	使诺鼻	6	Eliminated 19 June 2006
Juz-B		6	Eliminated 12 June 2006
Summer Breeze	夏日风	5	Eliminated 5 June 2006
Amber		6	Eliminated 29 May 2006
Silent Disorder	静爆乐团	3	Eliminated 8 May 2006
Jade		5	Eliminated 1 May 2006
Glamours		5	Eliminated 24 April 2006
G-Force		3	Eliminated 17 April 2006
Yuan Sheng Dai	愿声带	6	Eliminated 10 April 2006
Sky Power		3	Eliminated 10 April 2006
Defuse		5	Eliminated 10 April 2006
RustyNailz		5	Eliminated 10 April 2006

== Notes ==
Soul's member Ishi Lau Gek How, died of mysterious circumstances on June 28, 2007 in his own car parked in a carpark at the National Stadium. Rumours were that the former dance instructor committed suicide. Soul came back as special guest appearance on August 25, 2008 on the second season of SuperBand, with only three members.

== Season 2 ==
SuperBand
- Season 2
- Hosted by: Dasmond Koh; Christina Lin; Tang Lingyi
- Judges: Anthony Bao; Kenn O Cavin Soh
- Winner: Tu Zi
- Runner-up: Da Feng Chui
- Finals venue: Singapore Indoor Stadium

Release
- Original network: MediaCorp
- Original release: June 16 – October 5, 2008

Season 2 started on June 16, 2008, and ended with the grand final on October 5, 2008.

The actual competition started on June 23. The bands are randomly divided into two groups and compete on alternate weeks. Similarly, the band with the lowest score and the lowest votes in the respective group would be eliminated. The groups only start competing weekly during the three rounds of semi-finals. All shows start on Monday at 8:00 pm from June 16, 2008, except August 18, 2008 at 7:00 pm, with the results show delayed at 11:30 pm after an earlier recording at about 10:00 pm The grand final was held on October 5, 2008 at 7:30 pm in a special 3.5 hour finale.

The table below shows a summary of all the 16 finalists in Season 2.

English Name	Chinese Name	No. of members	Order Of Elimination / Status
Rabbit	兔子	3	Champion
Da Feng Chui	大风吹	5	Runner-Up Eliminated 5 October 2008
March	三月	5	Eliminated 5 October 2008
ethe'Real	异世界	5	Eliminated 5 October 2008
Screamm		4	Eliminated 22 September 2008
Wu Ge Ren	伍个人	5	Eliminated 22 September 2008 Revived 1 September 2008 Eliminated 11 August 2008
Sen Lin Tie	森林帖	4	Eliminated 15 September 2008
C! Star		3	Eliminated 8 September 2008 Revived 1 September 2008 Eliminated 28 July 2008
Chapalang	杂叭琅	4	Eliminated 25 August 2008
Soap	肥皂	5	Eliminated 18 August 2008
DreamFactory		5	Eliminated 4 August 2008
Synpathy		5	Eliminated 21 July 2008
Er Zuo Ju	二做剧	2	Eliminated 14 July 2008
Ink	樱	3	Eliminated 7 July 2008
Yi Xuan Feng	翼旋风	4	Eliminated 30 June 2008
Dandelion	蒲公英	3	Eliminated 23 June 2008

== Notes (Season 2) ==
Butter Huang from 三月 was a former member for his band Amber, whilst Xiao Long a.k.a. Lawrence from 樱 was a former member from Jade.
