= Change (Derrick Hoh album) =

變化

Studio album by Derrick Hoh
- Released: December 17, 2010
- Recorded: 2010
- Genre: Mandopop
- Length: 44:08
- Label: Play Music, Gold Typhoon

Change (Chinese: 變化) is the second album released by the Singaporean singer Derrick Hoh. The album was released on 17 December 2010. This record featured 14 tracks, consisting of a prelude/interludes/outro and 10 songs.

== Track listing ==
1. Prelude ~ Change
2. 說了八百遍
3. Interlude ~ Move On
4. 當我知道你們相愛
5. 空位
6. Baby
7. Interlude ~ Future
8. 愛的故事
9. 變化
10. 好好好
11. 不值得
12. Outro ~ The Beginning
13. 你.我
14. Refresh. Rise. Roar. (中文版)
