= Unclassified (Derrick Hoh album) =

無法歸類

Studio album by Derrick Hoh
- Released: 30 July 2008
- Genre: Mandopop
- Length: 42:50
- Label: Warner Music

Derrick Hoh chronology
無法歸類 (2008)	變化 (2010)

Unclassified (Chinese: 無法歸類) is the first album released by the Singaporean singer Derrick Hoh. Different editions of "Unclassified" were released thereafter by the end of 2008. The Taiwanese edition of "Unclassfied", released on 21 November 2008, was named "I'm New, I'm Good, I'm Derrick" (Chinese: 新生何維健) to suit the Taiwanese market. The Malaysian edition was released on 6 November 2008. This record featured 11 songs.

== Track listing ==
1. 無法歸類
2. 碰碰愛
3. 你走天橋 我走地下道
4. 今天過去
5. 我舍不得
6. 咬字
7. 忘得掉
8. 我相信
9. 我的連續劇
10. 順時針忘紀
11. 克羅地亞的天空

== Celebration Edition ==
The first repack version (Chinese: 慶功改版) of this album was first released on 23 September 2008. This version consist of an additional DVD with 4 music videos.

1. 無法歸類
2. 碰碰愛
3. 妳走天橋 我走地下道
4. 我舍不得

== Final Edition ==
The final repack version (Chinese: 很想你 – 終極改版) of this album was first released on 26 December 2008. This version consist of an additional AVCD with 1 new music video and 3 versions of a cover single.

1. 咬字 (Music Video)
2. 很想你
3. 很想你 (Missing You Version)
4. 很想你 (Piano Version)
