= Project SuperStar season 1 =

Project SuperStar
- Season 1
- Hosted by: Quan Yi Fong; Jeff Wang; Christina Lin (guest)
- Judges: Billy Koh; Lee Wei Song; Li Feihui; Anthony Png; Dawn Yip
- Winner: Kelvin Tan
- Runner-up: Kelly Poon
- Finals venue: Singapore Indoor Stadium

Release
- Original network: MediaCorp Channel U
- Original release: 22 June – 1 September 2005

Season chronology
- Next → Season 2

The first season of the Singaporean reality talent show Project SuperStar began on 22 June 2005 on MediaCorp Channel U. The show is hosted by Quan Yi Fong and Jeff Wang. The overall winner and runner-up received a talent management contract with Play Music and Universal Music Singapore respectively, together with MediaCorp. Billy Koh, Lee Wei Song, Roy Loi, Anthony Png and Dawn Yip were employed as the judges for the season.

On 1 September 2005, winner of the male category Kelvin Tan was announced as the overall winner of the season with a 64%-36% final vote, with female category winner Kelly Poon as the overall runner-up.

This season saw a profound success, and was introduced to a few contestants who would later become successful artistes: Darryl Yong who would later become a full-time Mediacorp artiste after participating another competition, Star Search, five years later in 2010, as well as Chen Jia Xin, Chew Sin Huey, Derrick Hoh, Hong Jun Yang, Sugianto and Hagen Tan, all of which became profound musicians in Singapore. The season also introduced Leon Lim, who would go on to finish as runner-up in the second season of MasterChef Singapore, 16 years later in 2021.

== Development ==
Over 4,000 aspirants auditioned for the competition when it was announced.

== Finalists ==
Key:

– Winner
– Runner-up
– Gender/Category runner-up
– Semi-finalist
– Category 6th-8th place (lost wildcard)
– Advanced via wildcard

Act	Age(s)	Occupation	Gender/Category	Result
Kelvin Tan 陈伟联	23	Freelance musician	Male	Winner
Kelly Poon 潘嘉丽	22	Flight attendant	Female	Runner-up
Chew Sin Huey 石欣卉	24	Unemployed	Female	Category Runner-up
Hong Jun Yang 洪俊扬	23	Student	Male	Category Runner-up
Silver Ang 洪子惠	19	Optometrist	Female	Category 3rd place
Derrick Hoh 何维健	19	Unemployed	Male	Category 3rd place
Jason Tan 陈国强	26	Undergraduate	Male	Category 4th place
Candyce Toh 杜慧萍	25	Bank officer	Female	Category 4th place
Chia Wei Choong 谢维聪	21	Unemployed	Male	Category 5th place
Ruth Chua 蔡诗妮	18	Student	Female	Category 5th place
Macy Guo 郭美汐	24	Financial advisor	Female	Category 6th-8th place
Lai Li Jun 黎俐君	21	Undergraduate	Female	Category 6th-8th place
Sebastian Leong 梁伟强	18	Student	Male	Category 6th-8th place
Leon Lim 林昱志	18	Student	Male	Category 6th-8th place
Chanel Pang 冯靖莹	19	Unemployed	Female	Category 6th-8th place
Hagen Tan 陈孟奇	24	Composer	Male	Category 6th-8th place
Chen Jia Xin 陈家欣	22	Student	Female	Category 9th-12th place
Raymond Chua 蔡义伟	26	Manufacturing engineer	Male	Category 9th-12th place
Sugianto 潘嗣敬	23	Unemployed	Male	Category 9th-12th place
Candy Tan 陈靖颖	21	Student	Female	Category 9th-12th place
William Tan 陈耀榕	22	Undergraduate	Male	Category 9th-12th place
Sandra Ter 戴爱玲	21	Unemployed	Female	Category 9th-12th place
Darryl Yong 杨子文	20	Unemployed	Male	Category 9th-12th place
Wendy Zhuo 卓慧玲	23	Marketing administrator	Female	Category 9th-12th place

== Live shows ==
=== Live show details ===
==== Week 1: Quarter-final 1 (22/23 June) ====
- Themes: Contestant duets; no theme

Contestants' performances on the first live show
Contestant	Order	First song (duet)	Order	Second song	Judges' score						Result
Contestant	Order	First song (duet)	Order	Second song	AP	FH	DY	WS	BK	Total	Result
Male category (22 June)
Sugianto	1	(with Leon Lim)	7	"不可能错过你"						28.5	Eliminated
Leon Lim	2	(with Sugianto)	8	"Forever Love"						31.0	Safe
Hong Jun Yang	3	"冻结" (with Darryl Yong)	9	"江南"						32.5	Safe
Darryl Yong	4	"冻结" (with Hong Jun Yang)	10	"爱我别走"						25.5	Eliminated
Kelvin Tan	5	"掌心" (with Jason Tan)	11	"I Believe"						29.0	Safe
Jason Tan	6	"掌心" (with Kelvin Tan)	12	"爱如潮水"						29.0	Safe
Female category (23 June)
Chew Sin Huey	1	"High High High" (with Kelly Poon)	7	"炫耀"						29.5	Safe
Kelly Poon	2	"High High High" (with Chew Sin Huey)	8	"美丽笨女人"	7.0	7.5	6.5	7.0	8.0	36.0	Safe
Chen Jia Xin	3	(with Ruth Chua)	9	"挥着翅膀的女孩"						32.0	Eliminated
Ruth Chua	4	(with Chen Jia Xin)	10	"奔"						27.0	Safe
Macy Guo	5	(with Candy Tan)	11	"不哭"						28.5	Safe
Candy Tan	6	(with Macy Guo)	12	"Baby对不起"						25.0	Eliminated

==== Week 2: Quarter-final 2 (29/30 June) ====
- Themes: Contestant duets; no theme

Contestants' performances on the second live show
Contestant	Order	First song (duet)	Order	Second song	Judges' score						Result
Contestant	Order	First song (duet)	Order	Second song	AP	FH	DY	WS	BK	Total	Result
Male category (29 June)
Chia Wei Choong	1	"找自己" (with Raymond Chua)	7	"流星森林雨"						32.0	Safe
Raymond Chua	2	"找自己" (with Chia Wei Choong)	8	"断点"						26.5	Eliminated
Derrick Hoh	3	"你走了" (with Sebastian Leong)	9	"除此之外"						35.0	Safe
Sebastian Leong	4	"你走了" (with Derrick Hoh)	10	"我懂了她"						24.5	Safe
William Tan	5	"翅膀" (with Hagen Tan)	11	"你不在"				8.0		37.0	Eliminated
Hagen Tan	6	"翅膀" (with William Tan)	12	"解脱"						32.0	Safe
Female category (30 June)
Candyce Toh	1	(with Sandra Ter)	7	"矜持"						31.0	Safe
Sandra Ter	2	(with Candyce Toh)	8							26.5	Eliminated
Wendy Zhuo	3	(with Lai Li Jun)	9							24.0	Eliminated
Lai Li Jun	4	(with Wendy Zhuo)	10	"你酷"						27.5	Safe
Silver Ang	5	(with Chanel Pang)	11							29.5	Safe
Chanel Pang	6	(with Silver Ang)	12	"祝我生日快乐"						27.5	Safe

==== Week 3: Quarter-final 3 (6/7 July) ====
- Themes: Contestant duets; no theme

Contestants' performances on the third live show
Contestant	Order	First song (duet)	Order	Second song	Judges' score						Result
Contestant	Order	First song (duet)	Order	Second song	AP	FH	DY	WS	BK	Total	Result
Male category (6 July)
Hong Jun Yang	1	(with Jason Tan)	5	"借口"						38.5	Safe
Jason Tan	2	(with Hong Jun Yang)	6							28.5	Safe
Derrick Hoh	3	"爱的就是你" (with Leon Lim)	7	"Piano"						36.5	Eliminated
Leon Lim	4	"爱的就是你" (with Derrick Hoh)	8	"唯一"						32.5	Eliminated
Female category (7 July)
Ruth Chua	1	(with Kelly Poon)	5	"一个人的精彩"						33.0	Safe
Kelly Poon	2	(with Ruth Chua)	6	"普通朋友"	7.0	7.5	8.0	7.5	6.0	36.0	Eliminated
Lai Li Jun	3	"Yes or No" (with Chew Sin Huey)	7	"写一首歌"						32.5	Eliminated
Chew Sin Huey	4	"Yes or No" (with Lai Li Jun)	8	"Revolution"						30.0	Safe

==== Week 4: Quarter-final 4 (13/14 July) ====
- Themes: Contestant duets; no theme

Contestants' performances on the fourth live show
Contestant	Order	First song (duet)	Order	Second song	Judges' score						Result
Contestant	Order	First song (duet)	Order	Second song	AP	FH	DY	WS	BK	Total	Result
Male category (13 July)
Hagen Tan	1	(with Chia Wei Choong)	5	"就是我"						32.5	Eliminated
Chia Wei Choong	2	(with Hagen Tan)	6	"比我幸福"	8.0	7.0	8.5	8.0	8.0	39.5	Safe
Sebastian Leong	3	"忠孝东路走九遍" (with Kelvin Tan)	7	"心伤心痛不痛"						28.5	Eliminated
Kelvin Tan	4	"忠孝东路走九遍" (with Sebastian Leong)	8	"远走高飞"						31.5	Safe
Female category (14 July)
Chanel Pang	1	"失恋万岁" (with Candyce Toh)	5	"无所谓"						30.5	Eliminated
Candyce Toh	2	"失恋万岁" (with Chanel Pang)	6							28.5	Safe
Macy Guo	3	(with Silver Ang)	7							28.0	Eliminated
Silver Ang	4	(with Macy Guo)	8	"逃亡"	6.5	6.0	6.5	6.5	7.0	32.5	Safe

==== Week 5: Wildcard round (20/21 July) ====
- Themes: Contestant duets; no theme

Contestants' performances on the fifth live show
Contestant	Order	First song (duet)	Order	Second song	Judges' score						Result
Contestant	Order	First song (duet)	Order	Second song	AP	FH	DY	WS	BK	Total	Result
Male category (20 July)
Derrick Hoh	1	"爱转动" (with Leon Lim)	5	"很想你"	7.5	8.5	7.0	8.0	8.0	39.0	Revived
Leon Lim	2	"爱转动" (with Derrick Hoh)	6	"爱我还是他"						38.5	Not revived
Sebastian Leong	3	(with Hagen Tan)	7	”当你孤单你会想起谁“						26.0	Not revived
Hagen Tan	4	(with Sebastian Leong)	8	"听海"						30.0	Not revived
Female category (21 July)
Macy Guo	1	(with Lai Li Jun)	5	"舍不得你"						31.5	Not revived
Lai Li Jun	2	(with Macy Guo)	6	"一个人生活"						31.0	Not revived
Chanel Pang	3	"假惺惺" (with Kelly Poon)	7	"一个人跳舞"						31.0	Not revived
Kelly Poon	4	"假惺惺" (with Chanel Pang)	8	"Open Your Eyes"	8.0	8.0	8.5	8.0	8.0	40.5	Revived

==== Week 6: Semi-final 1 (27/28 July) ====
- Themes: "Slow" song; "fast" song
- Group performance: "C'est Si Bon"

Contestants' performances on the sixth live show
Contestant	Order	First song	Second song	Judges' score						Result
Contestant	Order	First song	Second song	FH	DY	WS	AP	BK	Total	Result
Male category (27 July)
Jason Tan	1	"痴心绝对"	"Come On"		7.5		8.0		31.0	Safe
Chia Wei Choong	2	"我还能爱谁"	"Wu Ha"				8.5		35.5	Eliminated
Hong Jun Yang	3	"末日之恋"	"第二天堂"						39.0	Safe
Derrick Hoh	4	"记得"	"完美"	8.5	7.5	8.0	6.0	8.0	38.0	Safe
Kelvin Tan	5	"孤单的夜里我不孤单"	"情非得已"						36.5	Safe
Female category (28 July)
Silver Ang	1	"很好"	"说爱你"	5.5	6.0	6.0	6.5	7.0	31.0	Safe
Chew Sin Huey	2	"地狱天使"	"幸福的地图"						33.5	Safe
Ruth Chua	3	"话题"	"爱的主打歌"						28.5	Eliminated
Candyce Toh	4	"爱多少 早知道"	"好心情"						30.0	Safe
Kelly Poon	5	"自己"	"孤单芭蕾"	7.5	8.0	7.5	8.5	8.0	39.5	Safe

==== Week 7: Semi-final 2 (3/4 August) ====
- Theme: Oldies remakes
- Group performance: "冬天里的一把火"

Contestants' performances on the seventh live show
Contestant	Order	Song	Judges' score						Result
Contestant	Order	Song	FH	DY	WS	AP	BK	Total	Result
Male category (3 August)
Derrick Hoh	1	"月亮代表我的心"						36.5	Safe
Jason Tan	2	"热情的沙漠"				8.0		31.5	Eliminated
Kelvin Tan	3	"草原之夜"						28.5	Safe
Hong Jun Yang	4	"流水年华"	9.0	8.5	8.0	8.0	8.0	41.5	Safe
Female category (4 August)
Chew Sin Huey	1	"康定情歌"	7.5	7.0	8.0	8.0	8.0	38.5	Safe
Candyce Toh	2	"我只在乎你"						33.0	Eliminated
Kelly Poon	3	"可爱的玫瑰花"	8.0	8.5	8.0	8.0	7.0	39.5	Safe
Silver Ang	4	"爱神"						29.0	Safe

==== Week 8: Semi-final 3 (10/11 August) ====
- Theme: Songs from local drama series; songs by local artist
- Group performance: "一起走到"

Contestants' performances on the eighth live show
Contestant	Order	First song	Drama series	Order	Second song	Judges' score						Result
Contestant	Order	First song	Drama series	Order	Second song	FH	DY	WS	AP	BK	Total	Result
Male category (10 August)
Kelvin Tan	1	"我的生活在这里"	Five Foot Way	4	"走出黑暗的世界吧！朋友"	8.5	7.5	7.0	7.5	9.0	39.5	Safe
Hong Jun Yang	2	"遗忘过去"	Kopi-O	5	"他一定很爱你"	7.0	8.0	7.0	8.0	8.0	38.0	Safe
Derrick Hoh	3	"关怀方式"	Cupid Love	6	"你是我最深爱的人"	7.5	7.0	7.0	7.0	7.0	35.5	Eliminated
Female category (11 August)
Silver Ang	1	"都是夜归人"	Living by Night	4	"爱情字典"						31.0	Eliminated
Chew Sin Huey	2	"温柔的夜"	The Last Applause	5	"心痛"						41.5	Safe
Kelly Poon	3	"城里的月光"	Tofu Street	6	"担心"	7.5	8.0	7.5	7.5	8.0	38.5	Safe

==== Week 9: Category final (17/18 August) ====
- Themes: "Slow-to-fast transition" songs; English songs; winner's single
- Group performance: "制造浪漫"

Contestants' performances on the ninth live show
Contestant	Order	Songs	Judges' score							Result
Contestant	Order	Songs	FH	DY	WS	AP	BK	Total	Average	Result
Male category (17 August)
Hong Jun Yang	1	"爱很简单"	6.5	7.0	7.0	7.0	7.0	34.5	40.7	Runner-up
Hong Jun Yang	3	"If You Come Back"	8.5	9.0	8.5	8.0	9.0	43.0	40.7	Runner-up
Hong Jun Yang	5	"童话"	9.0	9.5	9.0	8.0	9.0	44.5	40.7	Runner-up
Kelvin Tan	2	"孤单北半球"						34.0	37.0	Winner
Kelvin Tan	4	"Heaven Knows"						37.0	37.0	Winner
Kelvin Tan	6	"童话"						40.0	37.0	Winner
Female category (18 August)
Kelly Poon	1	"回家"						41.0	38.7	Winner
Kelly Poon	3	"What's Up?"						37.0	38.7	Winner
Kelly Poon	5	"遗失的美好"						38.0	38.7	Winner
Chew Sin Huey	2	"哭不出来"						42.0	42.5	Runner-up
Chew Sin Huey	4	"Beautiful"						41.5	42.5	Runner-up
Chew Sin Huey	6	"遗失的美好"						44.0	42.5	Runner-up

==== Week 10: Final prelude (24/25 August) ====
Contestants' performances on the tenth live show
Contestant	Order	Song
Male category (24 August)
Derrick Hoh	1	"了解"
Jason Tan	2	"掌心" (featuring Kelvin Tan)
William Tan	3	"小镇姑娘"
Chia Wei Choong	4	"天空"
Hong Jun Yang	5	"晴天"
Kelvin Tan	6	"孤单的夜里我不孤单"
Female category (25 August)
Chew Sin Huey	1	"我恨我爱你"
Chanel Pang	2	"烦"
Chen Jia Xin	3	"至少还有你"
Candyce Toh	4	"勇气"
Ruth Chua	5	"超快感" (featuring Chanel Pang)
Kelly Poon	6	"美丽笨女人"

Note: For some unknown reason, Candy Tan was absent from the show.

==== Week 11: Final (1 September) ====
- Themes: "Crowd control" songs; unplugged songs; JJ Lin duets; newly penned songs; winner's song
- Group performances: "Super Star" (all finalists except Hagen Tan and Candy Tan), "风云变色" / "野蛮游戏" / "爱的Bubble" (Finalists eliminated in the quarter-finals except Hagen Tan and Candy Tan), "Guardian Angel" (performed by Hong Jun Yang), "感谢你用心爱我" (performed by Chew Sin Huey), "屋顶" (performed by Chew Sin Huey and Hong Jun Yang), "My Anata" / "808" / "痛快" (Finalists eliminated in the semi-finals)
- Musical guest: JJ Lin ("简简单单" / "豆浆油条" / "编号89757")

Contestants' performances on the eleventh live show
Contestant	Order	Songs	Judges' votes						Result
Contestant	Order	Songs	FH	DY	WS	AP	BK	Result	Result
Kelvin Tan	1	"男人.海洋"	✔	—	—	✔	—	2/5 (Lost)	Winner
Kelvin Tan	3	"我真的受伤了"^{1}	—	✔	✔	✔	✔	4/5 (Won)	Winner
Kelvin Tan	5	"一千年以后" (with JJ Lin)	—	—	—	—	—	0/5 (Lost)	Winner
Kelvin Tan	7	"被风吹过的夏天" (with JJ Lin & Kelly Poon)	—	—	—	—	—	0/5 (Lost)	Winner
Kelvin Tan	9	"了解"^{2}	—	—	—	✔	—	1/5 (Lost)	Winner
Kelvin Tan	11	"其实你不懂我的心"	—	—	—	—	—	0/5 (Lost)	Winner
Kelly Poon	2	"颜色"	—	✔	✔	—	✔	3/5 (Won)	Runner-up
Kelly Poon	4	"沙滩"^{3}	✔	—	—	—	—	1/5 (Lost)	Runner-up
Kelly Poon	6	"木乃伊" (with JJ Lin)	✔	✔	✔	✔	✔	5/5 (Won)	Runner-up
Kelly Poon	8	"被风吹过的夏天" (with JJ Lin & Kelvin Tan)	✔	✔	✔	✔	✔	5/5 (Won)	Runner-up
Kelly Poon	10	"On My Way"	✔	✔	✔	—	✔	4/5 (Won)	Runner-up
Kelly Poon	12	"被爱的女人"	✔	✔	✔	✔	✔	5/5 (Won)	Runner-up

^1 The performance featured backing vocals from Leon Lim, Derrick Hoh, Hong Jun Yang, Sugianto, and William Tan.
^2 The song was later re-released as 下雪, with the same tune but different lyrics, and is sung by A-do.
^3 The performance featured backing vocals from Chen Jia Xin, Chew Sin Huey, Chanel Pang, Sandra Ter, and Candyce Toh.
