= Jeremy Chan =

Singaporean actor and host (born 1981)

- Born: Chan Ming Yuew; 17 July 1981 (age 45); Singapore
- Education: ITE College West
- Occupations: Actor; host
- Years active: 2007–present
- Spouse: Jesseca Liu (m. 2017)
- Awards: Best Comedy Performance – Asian Academy Creative Awards; 2018 My Agent Is A Hero – Bert Tan; Best Male Lead – Star Awards; 2024 All That Glitters – Huang Jintiao

Chinese name
- Traditional Chinese: 田銘耀
- Simplified Chinese: 田铭耀
- Hanyu Pinyin: Tián Míngyào

Jeremy Chan Ming Yuew (born 17 July 1981) is a Singaporean actor and host.

== Education ==
Chan was educated at Zhangde Primary School and the now-defunct Saint Thomas Secondary School. He subsequently graduated from ITE College West (Dover Campus).

== Career ==
Chan was previously a bartender before participating in Project SuperStar season 2 in 2006. Chan made it to the quarter-finals but was eliminated there even though he was tied in score with Nathaniel Tan. He failed to pass the Wildcard Round where eliminated contestants had a chance to rejoin the talent show.

In 2006, Chan made his hosting debut in On the Beat, a MediaCorp Channel U variety show. He was then subsequently the host for On the Beat II, III, IV, V. In 2009, Chan made his acting debut in Table of Glory, a MediaCorp Channel 8 drama. In 2010, Chan made his film debut in Being Human, a J Team Productions movie.

== Personal life ==
Chan married Jesseca Liu on 16 July 2017.

== Filmography ==
=== Film ===
Year	Title	Role	Notes	Ref.
2010	Being Human			
2019	When Ghost Meets Zombie	Lai Lai		

=== Television series ===
Year	Title	Role	Notes	Ref.
2011	C.L.I.F.	Ye Ziqiang		
2011	On the Fringe 2011	Ah Dang		
2014	Who Killed the Lead	Mickey Chow		
2014	The Journey: A Voyage		Uncredited	
2014	The Recruit Diaries (阿兵新传)	Ye Laixiang		
2014	World at Your Feet	Alex Lim		
2015	Super Senior	Zhu Decong		
2016	I Want to Be a Star	Jeremy		
2016	Hero	John		
2017	My Teacher Is A Thug	Gao Xiaoming		
2017	Eat Already 2? (吃饱没2？)	Curry Puff		
2017	118 II	Asia Liu Yazhou		
2018	My Agent Is A Hero (流氓经纪)	Bert Tan		
2018	Love at Cavenagh Bridge (加文納娇的约定)	Zhang Danfei		
2019	Jalan Jalan (你去走走)	Zhang Weile		
2019	My Agent Is A Hero II (流氓经纪 II)	Bert Tan		
2019	A Whole World Difference (都市狂想)	Jimmy Siew		
2020	Super Dad (男神不败)	Li Zhengyi		
2021	Crouching Tiger Hidden Ghost	Ma Da		
2022	Soul Detective	Feng Kangkai /4896		
2023	Mr Zhou's Ghost Stories@Job Haunting II	Oscar		
2023	All That Glitters	Huang Jintiao		
2024	Once Upon A New Year's Eve (那一年的除夕夜)	Cai Yiming		
2025	Another Wok of Life			

=== Variety series ===
Year	Title	Role	Notes	Ref.
2006	On the Beat	Host		
2007	On the Beat II	Host		
2008	On the Beat III	Host		
2009	On the Beat IV	Host		
2010	On the Beat V	Host		
2012–2014	Weekend Gateway	Host		
2013	Laughing Out Loud	Multiple Characters		
2014	Project SuperStar (season 3)	Host		
2014	Body SOS S3	Guest Host		
2015	Body SOS S4	Guest Host		
2016	Star Awards 2015	G-Dragon & Co-Host		
2019	The Destined One	Guest Matchmaker		
2024	Double J BAEcation	Host		

== Discography ==
- 《乱掉》:OST of "Crouching Tiger Hidden Ghost"
- MediaCorp Music Lunar New Year Album 22 新传媒群星旺虎泰哥迎春乐

== Awards and nominations ==
Organisation	Year	Category	Nominated work	Result	Ref
Asian Academy Creative Awards	2018	Best Comedy Performance	My Agent Is A Hero	Won	
Asian Academy Creative Awards	2021	Best Actor in a Leading Role	Crouching Tiger Hidden Ghost	Nominated	
Asian Academy Creative Awards	2021	Best Theme Song	"乱掉" (Crouching Tiger Hidden Ghost)	Nominated	
Star Awards	2022	Best Actor	Crouching Tiger Hidden Ghost	Nominated	
Star Awards	2022	Favourite CP	Crouching Tiger Hidden Ghost	Nominated (Note: Shared with Jesseca Liu)	
Star Awards	2022	The Male Show Stealer	Crouching Tiger Hidden Ghost	Nominated	
Star Awards	2022	Best Theme Song	"乱掉" (Crouching Tiger Hidden Ghost)	Nominated	
Star Awards	2023	Top 10 Most Popular Male Artistes	—N/a	Won	
Star Awards	2023	Favourite Male Show Stealer	Soul Detective	Nominated	
Star Awards	2024	Best Actor	All That Glitters	Won	
Star Awards	2024	Top 10 Most Popular Male Artistes	—N/a	Won	
Star Awards	2024	The Show Stealer	All That Glitters	Nominated	
Star Awards	2025	Best Programme Host	Double J BAEcation	Nominated	
Star Awards	2025	Top 10 Most Popular Male Artistes	—N/a	Won	
Star Awards	2026	Best Supporting Actor	Another Wok of Life	Nominated	
