= Project SuperStar season 2 =

Project SuperStar
- Season 2
- Hosted by: Quan Yi Fong; Jeff Wang
- Judges: Billy Koh; Lee Wei Song; Roy Loi; Anthony Png; Dawn Yip
- Winner: Daren Tan
- Runner-up: Lydia Tan
- Finals venue: Singapore Indoor Stadium

Release
- Original network: MediaCorp Channel U
- Original release: 8 November 2006 – 4 February 2007

Season chronology
- ← Previous; Season 1 Next → Season 3

The second season of the Singaporean reality talent show Project SuperStar began on 8 November 2006 on MediaCorp Channel U. The show is hosted by Quan Yi Fong and Jeff Wang. The overall winner received talent management contracts with Warner Music Singapore and MediaCorp. Billy Koh, Lee Wei Song, Roy Loi, Anthony Png and Dawn Yip returned as judges for their second season.

On 4 February 2007, winner of the male category Daren Tan was announced as the overall winner of the season, with female category winner Lydia Tan as the overall runner-up. Tan was also the first previously eliminated contestant on Project SuperStar to win the competition.

The competition also introduced to Jeremy Chan who would later become a full-time Mediacorp actor, runner-up Tan and Carrie Yeo would later form into a duo band The Freshmen, and Kelvin Soon, a prominent singer-songwriter.

== Development ==
Season 2 was broadcast from 8 November 2006 to 4 February 2007. When the auditions are launched in early September, over 6,000 aspirants came to audition, breaking the record of all star-searching contests in Singapore.

The finalist were announced on an unknown date. Singer-songwriter Tay Kewei was originally selected as one of the final 24 finalists, but was later disqualified due to contractual violation. She was replaced by Sheila Ou, a contestant who was originally eliminated in the round three auditions.

== Finalists ==
Key:

– Winner
– Runner-up
– Gender/Category runner-up
– Semi-finalist
– Category 6th-8th place (lost wildcard)
- Advanced via wildcard

Act	Age(s)	Occupation	Gender/Category	Result
Daren Tan 陈世维	23	National serviceman	Male	Winner
Lydia Tan 陈迪雅	21	Undergraduate	Female	Runner-up
Nat Tan 陈铿百	20	National serviceman	Male	Category Runner-up
Carrie Yeo 杨佳盈	25	Account executive	Female	Category Runner-up
Averil Chan 陈诗韵	22	Undergraduate	Female	Category 3rd place
Kelvin Soon 孙文海	25	Lead singer	Male	Category 3rd place
Michelle Lew 刘若雯	24	Personal financial consultant	Female	Category 4th place
Zhang Le Sheng 张乐声	25	Unemployed	Male	Category 4th place
Maxilian Chan 曾裕淑	19	Student	Female	Category 5th place
Jon Toh 卓坊林	27	Sales executive	Male	Category 5th place
Jeremy Chan 田铭耀	25	Bartender	Male	Category 6th-8th place
Chua Wee Jian 蔡伟健	19	Student	Male	Category 6th-8th place
Jeremy Kwan 官镜瀚	23	Undergraduate	Male	Category 6th-8th place
Charlotte Loh 罗凤仪	25	Banking product controller	Female	Category 6th-8th place
Sheila Ou 欧千瑜	21	Service officer	Female	Category 6th-8th place
Dawn Wong 黄川美	22	Bank executive	Female	Category 6th-8th place
Anson Goh 吴幸荣	27	Sales associate	Male	Category 9th-12th place
Huang Shi Yu 黄仕昱	24	Undergraduate	Male	Category 9th-12th place
Lee Her Ching 李何菁	23	Pharmaceutical specialist	Female	Category 9th-12th place
Kenny Lim 林道文	22	Customer management executive	Male	Category 9th-12th place
Tang Ling Yi 汤灵伊	19	Student	Female	Category 9th-12th place
Jeff Teay 谢子伟	26	Civil servant	Male	Category 9th-12th place
Veron Yang 杨雪妮	24	Human resource executive	Female	Category 9th-12th place
Mag Yeong 杨艳宜	22	Unemployed	Female	Category 9th-12th place

== Live show details ==
=== Week 1: Quarter-finals 1 (22/23 November) ===
- Theme: No Theme

Contestants' performances on the first live show
Contestant	Order	Song	Judges' score	Result
Female category (22 November)
Averil Chan	1	"Fly Away"	30.5	Safe
Dawn Wong	2	"祝我生日快乐"	31.5	Safe
Maxilian Chan	3	"隐形的翅膀"	28.0	Safe
Carrie Yeo	4	"平常心"	32.0	Safe
Magdalene Yeo	5	"阴天"	28.5	Eliminated
Veron Yang	6	"了不起"	37.5	Eliminated
Male category (23 November)
Kenny Lim	1	"你记得吗"	28.5	Eliminated
Jeremy Chan	2	"无能为力"	27.5	Safe
Kelvin Soon	3	"Love Story"	35.5	Safe
Jon Toh	4	"你不在"	29.0	Safe
Huang Shiyu	5	"爱情树"	33.0	Eliminated
Jeremy Kwan	6	"翅膀"	27.0	Safe

=== Week 2: Quarter-finals 2 (29/30 November) ===
Contestants' performances on the second live show
Contestant	Order	Song	Judges' score	Result
Female category (29 November)
Charlotte Loh	1	"爱情旅程"	27.5	Safe
Michelle Lew	2	"不要骗我"	34.5	Safe
Lee Her Ching	3	"开始懂了"	27.0	Eliminated
Tang Ling Yi	4	"天边"	37.0	Eliminated
Sheila Ou	5	"你是我心中一句惊叹"	27.0	Safe
Lydia Tan	6	"讨厌"	37.5	Safe
Male category (30 November)
Chua Weijian	1	"我还能爱谁"	32.0	Safe
Nathaniel Tan	2	"流沙"	28.5	Safe
Zhang Le Sheng	3	"痊愈"	36.0	Safe
Anson Goh	4	"爱情不能作比较"	31.5	Eliminated
Jeff Teay	5	"Kiss Goodbye"	31.0	Eliminated
Daren Tan	6	"断点"	28.5	Safe

=== Week 3: Quarter-finals 3 (6/7 December) ===
- Theme: Retro Night (songs from 80s to 90s)

Contestants' performances on the third live show
Contestant	Order	Song	Judges' score	Result
Female category (6 December)
Dawn Wong	1	"听说爱情回来过"	30.0	Eliminated
Michelle Lew	2	"我是不是你最疼爱的人"	35.5	Safe
Averil Chan	3	"我一个人住"	27.5	Safe
Sheila Ou	4	"我依然是你的情人"	27.0	Eliminated
Male category (7 December)
Zhang Le Sheng	1	"心碎了无痕"	41.0	Safe
Jeremy Kwan	2	"伤心的人更伤心"	30.0	Eliminated
Jon Toh	3	"用尽一生的爱"	33.5	Safe
Daren Tan	4	"你知不知道"	36.5	Eliminated

=== Week 4: Quarter-finals 4 (13/14 December) ===
- Theme: Retro Night (songs from 80s to 90s)

Contestants' performances on the fourth live show
Contestant	Order	Song	Judges' score	Result
Female category (13 December)
Maxilian Chan	1	"走在阳光里"	26.5	Safe
Charlotte Loh	2	"一个人的我依然会微笑'	30.0	Eliminated
Lydia Tan	3	"难以抗拒你容颜"	31.5	Safe
Carrie Yeo	4	心情	29.5	Eliminated
Male category (14 December)
Jeremy Chan	1	"暗恋的代价"	36.0	Eliminated
Nathaniel Tan	2	"寂寞公路"	36.0	Safe
Chua Wee Jian	3	"祝福"	30.0	Eliminated
Kelvin Soon	4	"爱情傀儡"	41.0	Safe

=== Week 5: Wildcard Round (20/21 December) ===
- Theme: No theme

The eight contestants who were eliminated from the third and fourth quarter-finals returned to the stage to perform for the Wildcard round. The contestant who received the highest combined score from either the male and female categories would be reinstated from the competition.

Contestants' performances on the fifth live show
Contestant	Order	Song	Judges' score	Result
Female category (20 December)
Sheila Ou	1	"High High High"	28.5	Not Revived
Charlotte Loh	2	"我不难过"	23.0	Not Revived
Carrie Yeo	3	"我要快乐"	34.5	Revived
Dawn Wong	4	"Beautiful Love"	40.5	Not Revived
Male category (21 December)
Jeremy Kwan	1	"黑色幽默"	26.0	Not Revived
Chua Wee Jian	2	"曾经爱你永远爱你"	30.0	Not Revived
Daren Tan	3	"把你宠坏"	41.5	Revived
Jeremy Chan	4	"精舞门"	33.0	Not Revived

=== Week 6: Semi-Finals 1 (4/5 January) ===
- Theme: Medley of slow and dance songs

Contestants' performances on the second live show
Contestant	Order	Song	Judges' score	Result
Female category (4 January)
Averil Chan	1	"不想让你知道"/"So Crazy"	28.0	Safe
Michelle Lew	2	"等爱降落"/"情人的关怀"	29.0	Safe
Maxilian Chan	3	"月光"/"爱是你眼里的一首情歌"	26.0	Eliminated
Lydia Tan	4	"了解"/"你的微笑"	39.0	Safe
Carrie Yeo	5	"接受"/"神奇"	31.0	Safe
Male category (5 January)
Jon Toh	1	"Piano"/"编号 89757"	29.5	Eliminated
Kelvin Soon	2	"最近"/"天亮以后说分手"	38.0	Safe
Zhang Le Sheng	3	"中箭"/"龙的传人"	34.5	Safe
Nathaniel Tan	4	"世界唯一的你"/"波间带"	42.0	Safe
Daren Tan	5	"白色风车"/"呛司呛司"	43.0	Safe

=== Week 7: Semi-Finals 2 (11/12 January) ===
- Theme: Oldies night (Songs from 40s to 70s)

Contestants' performances on the second live show
Contestant	Order	Song	Judges' score	Result
Female category (11 January)
Michelle Lew	1	"情人的关怀"	27.5	Eliminated
Lydia Tan	2	"巧合"	36.5	Safe
Carrie Yeo	3	"我要你的爱"	29.0	Safe
Averil Chan	4	"橄榄树"	28.0	Safe
Male category (12 January)
Zhang Le Sheng	1	"我只在乎你"	32.5	Eliminated
Daren Tan	2	"若是你在我身边"	44.0	Safe
Kelvin Soon	3	"爱你一万年"	38.5	Safe
Nathaniel Tan	4	"大眼睛"	37.0	Safe

=== Week 8: Semi Finals 3 (18/19 January) ===
- Theme: Theme songs from local dramas and films

Contestants' performances on the eighth live show
Contestant	Order	First song	Order	Second song	Judges' score	Result
Female category (18 January)
Averil Chan	1	"如何对你说"	4	"月光爱人"	26.0	Eliminated
Lydia Tan	2	"新不了情"	5	"福满人间"	35.5	Safe
Carrie Yeo	3	"心动"	6	"我无所谓"	38.5	Safe
Male category (19 January)
Kelvin Soon	1	"如果.爱"	4	"微尘"	40.0	Eliminated
Nathaniel Tan	2	"生命过客"	5	"都是你"	38.5	Safe
Daren Tan	3	"菊花台"	6	"天天好心情"	40.5	Safe

=== Week 9: Category Final (25/26 January) ===
- Theme: Songs to get to the finals (no theme), English songs, Winner's single

Contestants' performances on the eighth live show
Contestant	Order	First song	Order	Second song	Order	Third song	Judges' score	Overall result	Result
Female category (25 January)
Lydia Tan	1	"枫"	3	"Angles Brought Me Here"	5	"触摸"	37.5	62.1%	Winner
Carrie Yeo	2	"写一首歌"	4	"Can't Take My Eyes Off You"	6	"触摸"	39.7	37.9%	Runner-up
Male category (26 January)
Daren Tan	1	"只因为你"	3	"This Love"	5	"I Believe"	39.0	52.72%	Winner
Nathaniel Tan	2	"嫁给我"	4	"Uptown Girl"	6	"I Believe"	37.0	47.28%	Runner-up

=== Week 11: Finals (4 February) ===
- Theme: Unplugged song, Jazz song, Hip-hop song, Rock song, Winner's song
- Group performances:

Contestants' performances on the eleventh live show
Contestant	Order	Songs	Judges	Score	Result
Daren Tan	1	"寂寞的季节"	—	59%	Winner
Daren Tan	3	"我的麦克风"	✔	59%	Winner
Daren Tan	5	"Sway"	—	59%	Winner
Daren Tan	7	"你快乐所以我快乐"	—	59%	Winner
Daren Tan	9	"靠近"	✔	59%	Winner
Lydia Tan	2	"纸飞机"	✔	41%	Runner-Up
Lydia Tan	4	"Dream A Little Dream Of Me"	—	41%	Runner-Up
Lydia Tan	6	"You Make Me Wanna"	✔	41%	Runner-Up
Lydia Tan	8	"Get High"	✔	41%	Runner-Up
Lydia Tan	10	"征服"	—	41%	Runner-Up
