= In the Heart of the World =

In the Heart of the World 在世界中心

Studio album by Kelly Poon
- Released: September 28, 2007
- Label: Universal Music

Kelly Poon chronology
Love Me, Kelly (2006)	In the Heart of the World 在世界中心 (2007)

Zai Shijie Zhongxin (Chinese: 在世界中心) is the second album by Singaporean singer Kelly Poon, and her first to be released in Taiwan. It was released on September 28, 2007.

== Track listing ==
1. It's Not Ending
2. 完美的默契 (Perfect Chemistry)
3. 溺愛 (Spoiled)
4. 再聯絡 (Get In Touch Again)
5. Flying
6. 在世界中心 (In the Heart of the World)
7. Shakalaka Baby (music by A. R. Rahman)
8. 第二生命 (Second Life)
9. Action
10. 一秒鐘的永遠 (One Second of Eternity)
11. 印象派的愛情 (Impressionistic Love)
12. Message
13. 給前男友 (To My Ex-Boyfriend)
14. LIVE
15. 別說我購物狂 (Don't Say I'm a Shopaholic)
