= Jeff Wang =

Taiwanese actor (born 1976)

- 王振復
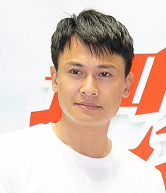
- Wang at a fundraising event for the 2014 Kaohsiung gas explosions
- Born: Wang Chien-fu; October 7, 1976 (age 49); Taiwan
- Other names: Wang Zhenfu; Wang Jianfu
- Occupations: Actor; host; businessman; singer
- Years active: 1999–present
- Awards: Star Search 1999 : Overall Male Champion
- Musical career
- Genres: Mandopop; Hokkien pop
- Instrument: Vocals
- Formerly of: Peace

Stage name
- Traditional Chinese: 王振復
- Simplified Chinese: 王振复
- Hanyu Pinyin: Wáng Zhenfù
- Jyutping: Wong4 Zan3 Fuk6
- Hokkien POJ: Ông Chín-ho̍k
- Tâi-lô: Ông Tsín-ho̍k

Birth name
- Traditional Chinese: 王建復
- Simplified Chinese: 王建复
- Hanyu Pinyin: Wáng Jiànfù

Jeff Wang Chen-fu (born Wang Chien-fu; October 7, 1976) is a Taiwanese actor, television host, businessman and singer. He was previously contracted to MediaCorp and was based in Singapore for over a decade. He was prominently a full-time Mediacorp artiste from 1999 to 2010. Deciding to pursue a career in singing, Wang left MediaCorp in 2010 and returned to his native Taiwan.

== Career ==
Wang was overall male champion on Star Search Singapore 1999 and was awarded a contract with MediaCorp. He began acting minor roles in various dramas and is best known for his role as the villain Ying Tiancheng in Holland V, which was voted the Top 10 Most Memorable Villains at the Star Awards 2007 anniversary special celebrating 25 years of Chinese drama. His big break in hosting came when he replaced Kym Ng and Bryan Wong as host of City Beat and was nominated for the Best Variety Show Host award twice. He has since hosted many programmes and events including the Chingay Parade, award-winning talk show Say It If You Dare and Project SuperStar.

Wang later diversified into singing. He wrote and sang the theme songs of several MediaCorp drama series which were nominated for the Best Theme Song several times. In 2009 he released his debut album Dream.Route. As he decided to pursue a career in singing, he left MediaCorp in 2010 and returned to his native Taiwan. His last drama with Mediacorp was Devil Blues.

== Business ventures ==
In 2008, Wang and some friends set up Xiao Bar Wang (小霸王), a chain of shops selling Taiwanese street snacks. It expanded into Malaysia and was co-managed by MediaCorp artistes Apple Hong and Ong Ai Leng. Wang received the SME One Asia Award (Emerging Award) in 2011.

In late 2020, Wang and a friend opened a Japanese restaurant named PS Sake Bar in Taipei.

== Personal life ==
Wang secretly married his long-time girlfriend, a Singaporean, in 2008 and they have a son. He only revealed his marriage to the press in early 2011. The marriage ended in 2013.

In December 2021, Wang announced that he had changed his Chinese name from Chien-fu (王建復) to Chen-fu (王振復).

== Selected filmography ==
=== Television series ===
Year	Title	Role	Notes
1999	Sensitive New Age Guy (新好男人)	Stewart	
2000	The Invincible Squad	Zhuo Sifeng	
2000	Adam's Company (亚当周记)	Bai Ketu (Tadpole)	
2001	The Hotel	Jeff	Guest appearance
2003	A Toast of Love	Lester	Guest appearance
2003	Holland V	Edison Ying Tiancheng	Nominated – Star Awards 2003 Best Supporting Actor
2003	Lobang King	Xu Jiefu	Nominated – Star Awards 2003 Best Comedy Performer
2004	Devil Blues (叛逆战队)	Yifa	
2004	Double Happiness	Luo Jiafu	Nominated – Star Awards 2004 Best Supporting Actor
2004	Double Happiness II	Luo Jiafu	
2020-2021	Girl's Power series (女力報到)	Han Sen	
2022	Life is Beautiful (美麗人生)	Yang Qingliang	
2022	Youngsters On Fire (機智校園生活-青春萬歲)	Chen Zhikai	Cameo
2023	Spanner A-Fa (扳手阿發)	Sun Wei	
2023	Fight for Justice (天道)	Luo Jiafeng; Liang Ruian	

=== Film ===
Year	Title	Role	Notes
2002	I Not Stupid	Mr Liu's Taiwanese Colleague	First and only film directed by Jack Neo; Cameo Appearance
2006	We Are Family (左麟右李之我爱医家人)	Dick	
2016	My Love Sinema	Brother Lee	

=== Television show hosting ===
Year	Title	Notes
2000–2003	City Beat 城人杂志	Nominated – Star Awards 2003 Best Variety Show Host; Nominated – Star Awards 2002 Best Variety Show Host
2003	Living Rooms 佳居情缘	
2003	Shoppers’ Guide II 周末大热卖II	
2002	Fann Adventure 非范之想	
2002	Super TV Champion 超级电视迷	
2002	Amazing World 你说奇怪不奇怪	
2004	All in NETS NETS有钱坤	
2005	KP Club II 鸡婆俱乐部II	
2005	Man O Man 男人帮	
2005	Quirky Foodies 餐餐有趣味	
2005	KP Club 鸡婆俱乐部	
2005	Project Superstar 1 绝对Superstar 1	Nominated – Star Awards 2005 Best Variety Show Host
2005	Project Slim 享瘦人生	
2005	Say Cheeze 好摄2人组	
2005	The Jetstar Asia Experience 飞行星体验	
2005	Say It If You Dare 有话好好说	
2005	Chingay 2005 妆艺大游行2005	
2006	Star Awards 2006 Post-show Party 红星大奖2006 – 庆功宴	
2006	Project SuperStar 2 绝对SuperstarII	
2006	Man O Man II 男人帮II	
2006	A* Planner 明星特派员	
2006	PSC Nite 2006 全新普威展活力	
2006	Project Slim II 享瘦人生II	
2006	Say It If You Dare II 有话好好说II	
2006	Superband 1 非常Superband 1	
2007	Star Awards 2007 Post-show Party 红星大奖2007 – 庆功宴	
2007	The Cancer Charity Show 癌过有晴天	
2007	OSIM iGift uHealthy Osim送礼更健康	
2007	Bioskin Dreams Come True 让你好看	
2007	The Mission 4 创业无敌手	
2007	Behind Challenge 奇人创奇录 /中新合作	
2007	Say It If You Dare 3 有话好好说3	
2007	I Cook For You 名厨上菜	
2007	Ren Ci Charity Show 2007 仁心慈爱照万千2007	
2007	Music Is in the Air 音乐格斗场	
2007	Way to go 冤家路窄	
2007	The Essential LNY Guide 迎春接福好过年	
2008	Say It If You Dare 4 有话好好说4	
2008	My Star Guide III 我的导游是明星3	(Dali City, Lijiang and Southern Silk Road)
2009	Giant Stars 2009 星光灿烂Stars 2009	
2010	Taiwan – My Taste Paradise 食分不一样	

== Discography ==
=== Studio albums ===
Year	Title	Notes
2009	Dream Routes (夢途)	
2014	Love.Rock.Forever (愛.Rock.永遠)	As 87Band

== Awards and nominations ==
Year	Ceremony	Category	Nominated work	Result
2000	Star Awards	Best Newcomer	—N/a	Nominated
2002	Star Awards	Best Variety Show Host	City Beat 城人杂志	Nominated
2003	Star Awards	Best Comedy Performer	Lobang King 我是Lobang King	Nominated
2003	Star Awards	Best Supporting Actor	Holland V 荷兰村	Nominated
2003	Star Awards	Best Variety Show Host	City Beat 城人杂志	Nominated
2004	Star Awards	Best Variety Show Host	All in NETS NETS有钱坤	Nominated
2004	Star Awards	Best Supporting Actor	Double Happiness 喜临门	Nominated
2004	Star Awards	Best Theme Song	《回来》 (My Love, My Home)	Nominated
2005	Star Awards	Best Variety Show Host	Project SuperStar Grand Finals 绝对SuperStar 总决赛	Nominated
2005	Star Awards	Top 10 Most Popular Male Artistes	—N/a	Nominated
2007	Star Awards	Best Theme Song	《并肩的方向》 (The Peak)	Nominated
2007	Star Awards	Best Theme Song	《风的肩膀》 (The Homecoming)	Nominated
2007	Star Awards	Top 10 Most Popular Male Artistes	—N/a	Nominated
2007	Star Awards	Top 10 Most Memorable Villains (Drama category)	Ying Tiancheng (Holland V)	Won
2010	Star Awards	Best Theme Song	《乒乓圆》 (Table of Glory)	Nominated
