= Daren Tan =

Singaporean singer

- Born: Daren Tan Sze Wei (simplified Chinese: 陈世维; traditional Chinese: 陳世維; pinyin: Chén Shìwéi); February 22, 1983 (age 43); Singapore
- Education: Gan Eng Seng School; Ngee Ann Polytechnic
- Occupation: Singer
- Years active: 2007–present
- Spouse: Nadia Lum (m. 2017)

Chinese name
- Traditional Chinese: 陳軒昱
- Simplified Chinese: 陈轩昱
Transcriptions
Standard Mandarin
- Hanyu Pinyin: Chén Xuān Yù
- Musical career
- Genres: Mandopop
- Label: Warner Music (2007-present)

Daren Tan Xuan Yu (born 22 February 1983) is a Singaporean singer. He was the winner of Project Superstar Season 2. He has been listed among CLEO magazine's 50 Most Eligible Bachelors. He changed his Chinese name to Chén Xuān Yù in 2014, and this was formally announced in Project Superstar 3 live show on national TV on 25 August 2014.

== Discography ==
Tan's debut album, titled Regardless, was released islandwide on January 26, 2008. One of his songs, "Dou Shen", is the theme song for the popular Mediacorp drama Metamorphosis.

The first song in his debut album, titled "Regardless" (Bu Xu Li You) is actually a remake of Melee's single "Built To Last".

== Filmography ==
=== Film ===
Year	Title	Role	Notes
2013	That Girl in Pinafore	Jiaming	
2015	Mr. Unbelievable	TV Male Lead	

=== Television ===
Year	Title	Role	Notes	Ref
2013	Mata Mata	Lim Seng Hock		
2014	Mata Mata 2: A New Era	Lim Seng Hock		
2015	Koji Cooks			
2015	Mata Mata 3: A New Generation	Lim Kiat "Kenny"		
2016	House of Fortune 钱来运转	Bobby		
2016	The Queen 复仇女王	Zhao Xianghai 赵向海		
2019	128 Circle	Dominic Yang		

=== Personal life ===
Tan was educated at Bukit Panjang Pri School, Gan Eng Seng School and Ngee Ann Polytechnic.

Tan founded Cahoots Social Network, an influencer marketing agency in 2016.

Tan married Dr. Nadia Lum in November 2017, after having met through a mutual friend and got engaged after dating for almost two years. Their first child, a girl was born on 22 December 2018. Their second child, a boy, was born on 30 May 2022.

== Awards ==
- Project Superstar Season 2 Male Champion
- Project Superstar Season 2 Overall Champion
- Cleo's Most Eligible Bachelor (2008)

Preceded by Kelvin Tan	Winner of Project SuperStar; 2006–07	Succeeded by Alfred Sim
