= Kelly Poon =

Singaporean singer and actress (born 1983)

- 潘嘉麗
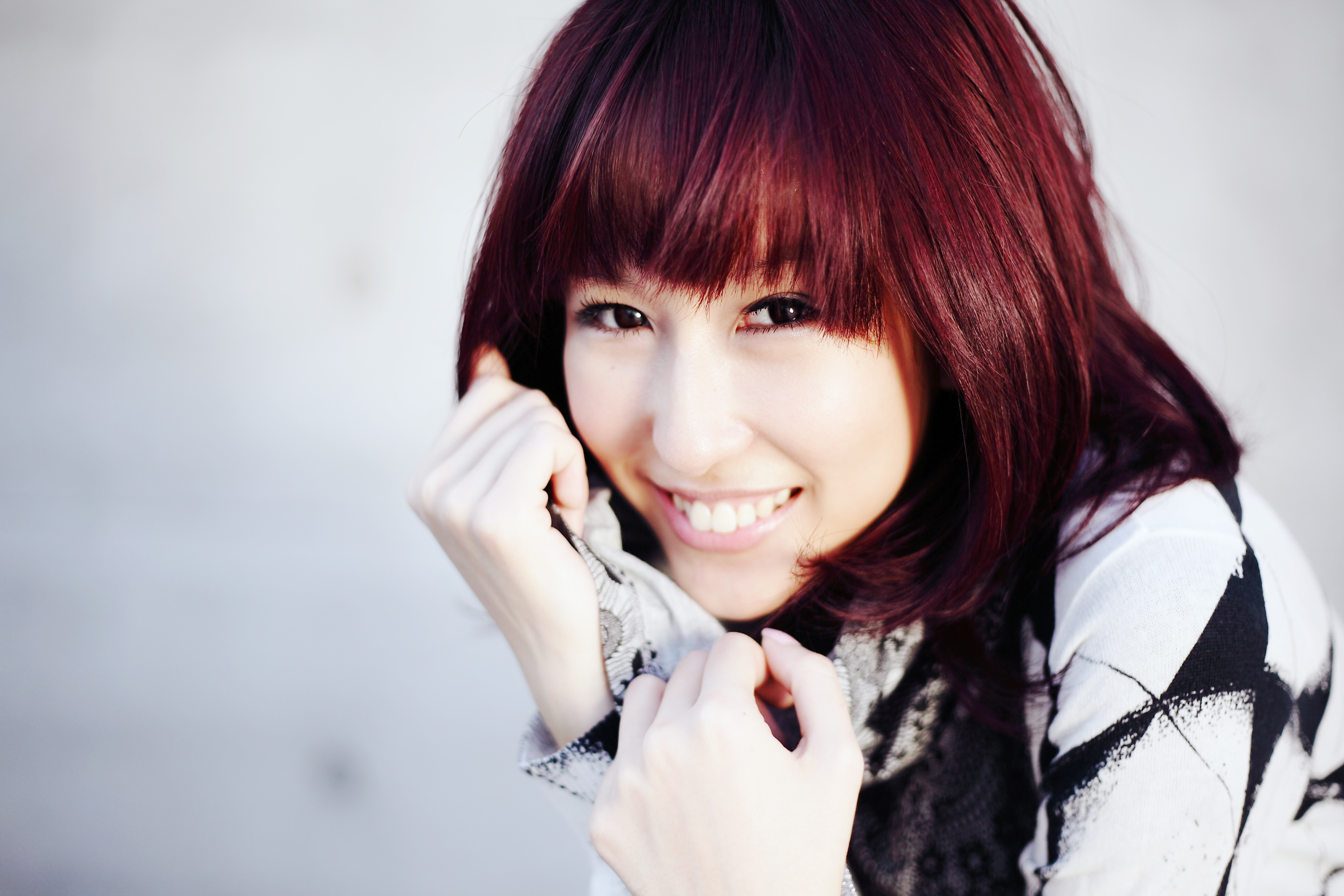
- Poon in a promotional photo in 2010
- Born: 11 July 1983 (age 43); Singapore
- Other names: Kelly Pan; Pan Jiali
- Education: Singapore Polytechnic
- Occupations: Singer; songwriter; actress; host
- Years active: 2005–present
- Spouse: Roger Yo (m. 2020)
- Musical career
- Genre: Mandarin pop
- Instrument: Vocals
- Labels: Universal Music; Rock Records; Mode Entertainment; Cosmos Entertainment; Easy Time Ent; Between Us Ent

Chinese name
- Traditional Chinese: 潘嘉麗
- Simplified Chinese: 潘嘉丽
- Hanyu Pinyin: Pān Jiālì
- Website: kellypoon.pixnet.net

Kelly Poon (born 11 July 1983) is a Singaporean singer, songwriter and actress who was the runner-up on the first season of the Project SuperStar singing competition held in Singapore.

== Early life ==
Poon attended Huamin Primary School and Yishun Town Secondary School. She later graduated from Singapore Polytechnic with a Diploma in Maritime Transport Management in 2004.

== Career ==
After graduation in 2004, Poon became an air stewardess with Singapore Airlines.

She auditioned for Project SuperStar in April 2005 and was eliminated in the fourth quarter-final, but was back on stage following sufficient public votes in the revival round. She supposedly impressed both the critics and the judges with her on-stage personality and versatility, and then came in second in the Grand Finals of Project Superstar whilst securing a recording deal with Universal Music.

She released her first album Love Me, Kelly on 14 February 2006 in Singapore. Later, Poon signed a management contract with Yao Chien and released her second album In the Heart of the World in Singapore and Taiwan. Her third album, Smiling Kelly, was released on 22 October 2008 in Taiwan. By the end of 2010, she ended her contract with Yao Chien and signed with Rock Records in the same year, releasing her fourth album Super Kelly on 29 July 2011 in Taiwan and 3 August 2011 in Singapore.

In 2013, Poon hosted her first television show 女人我最大 新加坡, working with Pauline Lan.

Poon moved to Mode Entertainment in Singapore and Cosmos Entertainment in Taiwan in 2014. Her EP Miss Kelly was released in July 2014. Poon was appointed as spokesperson of casual clothing brand dENiZEN in 2015. Her most recent Album Miss Kelly was released in July 2014, consisting of her compositions too. In the same year, Kelly was awarded an Singapore Golden Melody Award and also won an award at the Global Chinese Music Awards. She then also acted in a movie with Tender Huang in 2017.

== Personal life ==
Poon revealed that she has keloid problems, where she scars easily after a wound heals, "if a mosquito bites me, it takes very long for the bite to heal". Her mother is known to constant worry about Poon's well-being. On 24 February 2020, Poon registered her marriage to Roger Yo, a Taiwanese music producer-songwriter. In August 2023, it was announced that the couple was expecting their first child, a boy.

== Discography ==
=== Singles ===
Single #	Single Information
1	遺失的美好: Released: September 2005 (Singapore); From Album: 遺失的美好; Language: Mandarin Chinese; Label: Warner Music; Genre: Mandopop
1a	被愛的女人: Released: September 2005 (Singapore); From Album: Best of 絕對Superstar; Language: Mandarin Chinese; Label: Warner Music; Genre: Mandopop
2	Shakalaka Baby: Released: 2007 (Singapore); From Album: 排行榜總冠軍 Best Of #1 Hits 2007; Language: Mandarin Chinese; Label: Warner Music; Genre: Mandopop
3	維多利亞的愛: Released: August 2007 (Singapore); From Album: 維多利亞的愛; Language: Mandarin Chinese; Label: Music Nation; Genre: Pop
4	限時的遺忘: Released: August 2008 (Singapore); From Album: none; Language: Mandarin; Label: MusicNation; Genre: Pop
5	鳶尾花 with Yellow Lee: Released: February 2009; From Album: 大國咖; Language: Mandarin Chinese; Label: MusicNation; Genre: Pop
6	花非花; Odds in Love Movie theme song: Released: December 2010; From Album: none; Language: Mandarin; Label: Warner Music; Genre: Pop

=== Studio albums ===
Album #	Album Information
1st	Love Me, Kelly: Released: 14 February 2006 (Singapore); Language: Mandarin Chinese; Label: Universal Music; Genre: Mandopop
1st	Love Me, Kelly (Part 2: Celebration Album): Released: 24 April 2006 (Singapore); Language: Mandarin Chinese; Label: Universal Music; Genre: Mandopop
2nd	Hello Kelly, 在世界中心 (Zai Shi Jie Zhong Xin / Center of the World): Released: 28 September 2007 (Worldwide); Language: Mandarin Chinese; Label: Universal Music; Company: URSA MAJOR; Genre: Mandopop
3rd	Smiling Kelly: Released: 22 October 2008 (Taiwan); Released: 7 November 2008 (Singapore); Language: Mandarin Chinese; Label: Universal Music; Company: MUSICNATION; Genre: Mandopop
4th	Super Kelly 超給麗: Released: 29 July 2011 (Taiwan); Released: 3 August 2011 (Singapore); Language: Mandarin Chinese; Label: Rock Records; Company: Rock Records; Genre: Mandopop
5th	Miss Kelly 情人嘉麗: Released: July 2014 (Taiwan); Released: July 2014 (Singapore); Language: Mandarin Chinese; Label: Mode Entertainment; Company: Cosmos Entertainment; Genre: Mandopop
6th	Self titled Kelly 潘嘉麗 同名專輯: Released: Dec 2022 (Taiwan); Released: Dec 2022 (Singapore); Language: Mandarin Chinese; Label: Mode Entertainment; Company: Easy Time Entertainment; Genre: Mandopop

== Filmography ==
=== Television series ===
Year	Title	Role	Notes	Ref.
2006	Dream Chasers (梦·拼图)	Lynn		
2006	Maggi & Me		Guest appearance	
2009	Dream Chasers (星光依旧灿烂)	Charlene		
2020–2021	Girl's Power (女力報到)	Chang Yu-hsuan; Kelly Chang		
2022	Women in Taipei	Pharmacist		

=== Film ===
Year	Title	Role	Notes	Ref.
2010	Odds in Love (愛情鬥陣)			
2017	Countdown to Marriage (結婚倒數180天)		Short film	
2021	Gatao - The Last Stray (角頭—浪流連)			

=== Variety and reality show ===
Year	Title	Notes	Ref.
2013	Lady First Singapore (女人我最大 新加坡版)	Co-host	

=== Music video appearances ===
Year	Song title	Artist	Notes	Ref.
2015	"Dai Yu" (黛玉)	GJ		

== Awards and nominations ==
- Project Superstar Season 1 Female Champion – Singapore
- 最有潜力新人奖: 雪碧榜 – Shanghai
- 最有潜力新人奖: 新城國語力 – Hong Kong
- 區域傑出歌手獎 – 新加坡: 第19屆 新加坡金曲獎 – Singapore

=== Star Awards ===
Year	Award	Nominated work	Result
2017	Best Theme Song	You Can Be an Angel 2	Nominated
