= Project SuperStar =

Singing competition show in Singapore

- Genre: Reality television
- Presented by: Quan Yi Fong (season 1–2); Jeff Wang (season 1–2); Jeremy Chan (season 3–); Dasmond Koh (season 3–); Shane Pow (season 3–)
- Judges: Billy Koh (season 1–2); Lee Wei Song (season 1–2); Li Feihui; Anthony Png (season 1–2); Dawn Yip; Eric Ng (season 3–)
- Country of origin: Singapore
- Original language: Chinese
- No. of seasons: 3
- No. of episodes: 60

Production
- Production locations: Various (auditions); MediaCorp TV Theatre (live shows); Singapore Indoor Stadium (final)
- Running time: 20–160 minutes

Original release
- Network: MediaCorp Channel U
- Release: 22 June 2005 – 26 October 2014

Project SuperStar (Chinese: 绝对 SuperStar) is a singing talent search competition organised by MediaCorp and broadcast on Channel U in Singapore. Project SuperStar was organised to uncover and develop young talent in Mandarin pop in Singapore. Closely modelled after the Pop Idol, 24 contestants were selected to enter the Quarter Finals of the competition. For both seasons, it was hosted by Quan Yi Fong and Jeff Wang. Episodes were pre-recorded, and broadcast on Wednesday for male contestants, while episodes on Thursday feature female contestants. Season 3's Live-telecast will begin on 18 August 2014 and the finale is set to be on 26 October 2014. It is announced that Dasmond Koh, Jeremy Chan and Shane Pow will be the hosts for the third season.

== Format ==
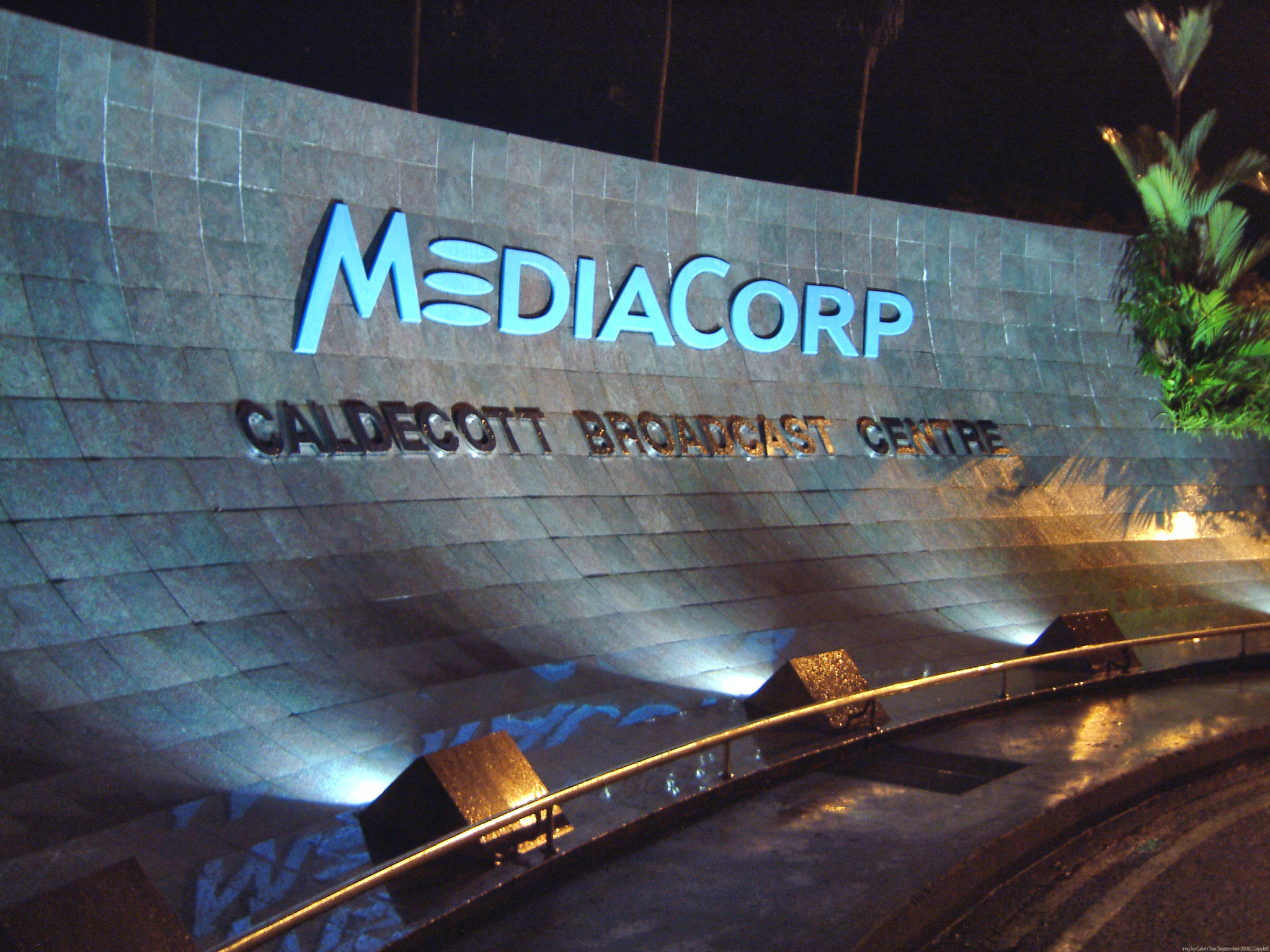

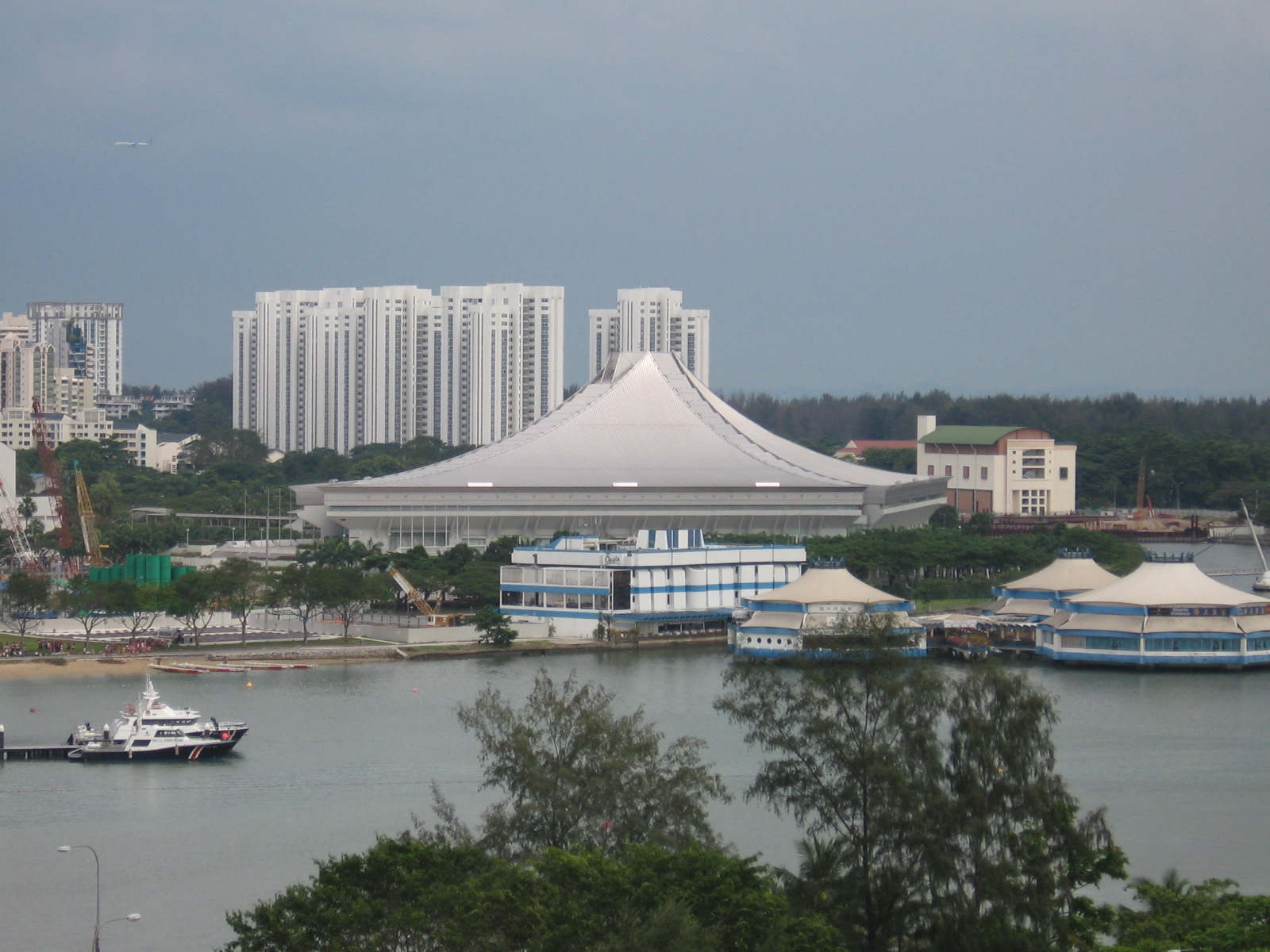
Live shows were held at the then-Mediacorp campus (left), while the finals for the first two seasons were held at the Singapore Indoor Stadium (right).

For the first two seasons, competition begins with an audition in front of an audience and judges, and through a series of rounds, judges picked 24 contestants, 12 male and 12 female, to compete in the live shows. With the exception of the finals, contestants compete at the MediaCorp studios while the finals were held at Singapore Indoor Stadium.

In each week, contestants perform in weekly shows in front of a panel of judges, who assessed their performances based on their singing technique, body language, and overall presentation, and each judge gave a score out of a maximum 10 with intervals of 0.5. Contestants also faced the public vote which opened on the start of the performances and closes hours later. The scoring weightage for judges and public vote were 70% and 30% respectively, and the contestants with the lowest scores for the particular gender that week faces elimination.

The competition was divided into three phases, Quarterfinals, Semifinals and Finals. Quarterfinals held for four weeks and compete in two out of four weeks, one on the first half (Top 24) and one on the later half (Top 16). In the Top 16 rounds, the top two highest scoring contestants per each gender moves on to the semifinals, while the bottom two will participate in a fifth week, entitled Revival round, vying for a fifth spot in the semifinals.

In the semifinals, contestants compete in four weeks of shows, each with a different theme with the same scoring ratio. Contestants who earned the lowest overall score for each gender were progressively eliminated each week until only one contestant remain, which then be named as a category winner. In a first for a Singaporean competition, the final four must also make studio recording of a winning single prior to the start of the semifinals.

In the finals, two category winners compete head-to-head with each other where the outcome is decided solely by public vote. The judges are also allowed though they could only give their opinions to the contestants and vote on deciding who performed better for this song. In addition to the voting, purchases of contestant performances counted singly during the official voting window and only accredited to 30% of the final scores, and the contestant with a higher score is crowned the overall winner.

Season three saw many changes in the competition format by reducing the number of contestants to 12 (six per gender) with similar elimination rules including the removal of the Revival round, and a coaching format identical to The X Factor and The Voice. Public voting mechanics were also changed with viewers now using the Toggle Now app to cast their votes, promoting television interactivity, and judges scores now factored in the grand finals, now held at the studios instead.

== Series overview ==
To date, three seasons have been broadcast, as summarised below.

Contestant in male category
Contestant in female category

Season	Start	Finish	Winner	Runner-up	Third place	Winning coach	Winning manager	Main hosts	Guest hosts	Main judges	Guest judges	Sponsors
One	22 June 2005	1 September 2005	Kelvin Tan	Kelly Poon	Chew Sin Huey	—N/a		Quan Yi Fong; Jeff Wang	Dennis Chew^{1} Christina Lin^{1}	Billy Koh; Lee Wei Song; Roy Loi; Anthony Png; Dawn Yip	—N/a	VodaVoda; Mango TV; M1
One	22 June 2005	1 September 2005	Kelvin Tan	Kelly Poon	Hong Jun Yang	—N/a		Quan Yi Fong; Jeff Wang	Dennis Chew^{1} Christina Lin^{1}	Billy Koh; Lee Wei Song; Roy Loi; Anthony Png; Dawn Yip	—N/a	VodaVoda; Mango TV; M1
Two	8 November 2006	4 February 2007	Daren Tan	Lydia Tan	Nat Tan	—N/a		Quan Yi Fong; Jeff Wang; Christina Lin^{2}	Lee Teng^{3} Charlyn Lin^{3} Pornsak^{3} Sim Yun Ying^{3}	Billy Koh; Lee Wei Song; Roy Loi; Anthony Png; Dawn Yip	—N/a	SK Jewellery; Hoyu; Sony; Silkpro; SILKYGIRL; M1
Two	8 November 2006	4 February 2007	Daren Tan	Lydia Tan	Carrie Yeo	—N/a		Quan Yi Fong; Jeff Wang; Christina Lin^{2}	Lee Teng^{3} Charlyn Lin^{3} Pornsak^{3} Sim Yun Ying^{3}	Billy Koh; Lee Wei Song; Roy Loi; Anthony Png; Dawn Yip	—N/a	SK Jewellery; Hoyu; Sony; Silkpro; SILKYGIRL; M1
Three	18 August 2014	26 October 2014	Alfred Sim	Abigail Yeo	Justin Chua	Dawn Yip	Jeremy Chan	Dasmond Koh; Jeremy Chan^{4} Shane Pow^{4}	—N/a	Roy Loi; Dawn Yip; Eric Ng	Tiger Huang^{5} Lee Wei Song^{5}	AMC Live; Marigold Peel Fresh; White Rabbit; Calbee; Eversoft
Three	18 August 2014	26 October 2014	Alfred Sim	Abigail Yeo	Tan Yan Hua	Dawn Yip	Jeremy Chan	Dasmond Koh; Jeremy Chan^{4} Shane Pow^{4}	—N/a	Roy Loi; Dawn Yip; Eric Ng	Tiger Huang^{5} Lee Wei Song^{5}	AMC Live; Marigold Peel Fresh; White Rabbit; Calbee; Eversoft

Notes

1. Dennis Chew and Christina Lin served as the leaders of the supporters during the final. Chew led the supporters of male category winner Kelvin Tan, while Lin led the supporters of female category winner Kelly Poon.
2. Christina Lin presented backstage for the performance shows on Wednesdays and Thursdays.
3. Lee Teng, Charlyn Lin, Pornsak and Sim Yun Ying served as the leaders of the supporters during the final. Lee and Pornsak led the supporters of male category winner Daren Tan, while Lin and Sim led the supporters of female category winner Lydia Tan.
4. Jeremy Chan and Shane Pow presented backstage and acted as the managers for the contestants.
5. Tiger Huang and Lee Wei Song would serve as the guest judges at the final.

== International Versions ==
Malaysia produced their own version, Project SuperStar Malaysia, which was broadcast on 8TV (Malaysia). Its first season premiered in 2006, while its third and recent season premiered on 9 February 2008 and ended on 3 May 2008.
