= List of Singaporean singers =

This is a list of notable Singaporean singers that have entered the industry, currently working or have left the industry.

== A ==
- Jacintha Abisheganaden
- Ronald Alcantra

== B ==
- Boon Hui Lu
- Ming Bridges

== C ==
- Sarah Cheng-De Winne
- Olinda Cho
- Inch Chua
- Joi Chua
- Tanya Chua

== D ==
- Kartina Dahari

== F ==
- Vanessa Fernandez

== G ==
- Kaira Gong

== H ==
- Hanjin Tan
- Hong Junyang
- Jarrell Huang
- Huang Qing Yuan

== J ==
- Jeric T

== K ==
- Benjamin Kheng
- Narelle Kheng
- Daphne Khoo
- Serene Koong

== L ==
- Momo Latiff
- Annette Lee
- Eleanor Lee
- Jonathan Leong
- Charlie Lim
- JJ Lin
- Ling Kai
- Linying

== N ==
- Tabitha Nauser
- Hubert Ng

== R ==
- Rhyu

== S ==
- Michelle Saram
- Sezairi Sezali
- Arun Shenoy
- Sherman Zhuo
- Shye
- Sylvester Sim
- Cavin Soh
- Jasmine Sokko
- Regina Song
- Stefanie Sun

== T ==
- Kelvin Tan
- Sandra Riley Tang
- Tay Kewei
- Tay Kexin
- Trisno

== W ==
- Leon Jay Williams

== Y ==
- Jimmy Ye

== Z ==
- Sherman Zhuo
