= SPOP Sing! season 1 =

SPOP Sing!
- Season 1
- Hosted by: Lee Teng; Bonnie Loo; Gao Meigui; Quan Yifeng (Semi-finals and Grand finals)
- Judges: Billy Koh; Peter Lee; Jimmy Ye; Joi Chua (quarter-finals/semi-final); Liang Wern Fook (guest); Eric Moo (guest); Paul Lee (guest)
- No. of contestants: 20
- Winner: Jarrell Huang
- Runner-up: Marcus Tay
- Finals venue: Padang, Singapore
- No. of episodes: 10 (televised); 6 (All About SPOP); 46 (Toggle-exclusive video episodes)

Release
- Original network: MediaCorp Channel 8 Mediacorp Channel U (prelude only); Toggle (Highlights, spin-offs and all episodes)
- Original release: 9 August – 4 November 2018

SPOP Sing! (Chinese: SPOP 听我唱!; pinyin: SPOP Tīng Wǒ Chàng) is a Chinese singing reality competition broadcast by Mediacorp Channel 8. Season 1 premiered on 9 August after the broadcast of National Day Parade and ended on the live finale on 4 November at Padang.

During the live finals, 18-year-old Singapore Polytechnic student Jarrell Huang (17 at the time of his audition) was announced the winner of SPOP Sing!, and 21-year-old LASALLE College of the Arts student Marcus Tay was declared as a runner-up.

== Development ==
The show was first revealed to the public on 22 April 2018 during the broadcast of Star Awards 2018 with a teaser clip uploaded to Toggle, aimed to promote the Chinese culture, the music genre of mandopop and xinyao, and paying tribute to local singing talents of Singapore. This is also the first S-Pop themed competition in more than a decade, since SPOP Hurray! in 2008. The grand prize for winning SPOP Sing! is a cash prize of S$30,000, and the winner's own debut single, titled "逆风飞翔" (originally sung by Hsiao Huang-chi and composed by Peter Lee) released under a recording deal.

Former Sing! China finalists Nathan Hartono and Joanna Dong, as well as songwriter Boon Hui Lu, were appointed as the show's ambassadors, while Lee Teng, Bonnie Loo and YES 933 DJ Gao Meigui hosted the programme.

The show premiered on national TV with the prelude episode "Spop Sing! Prelude" on National Day 2018 at 9pm on Channel U. Apart from the top 20 contestants, judges and ambassadors, Jim Lim was revealed as the music director, and Serene Koong was revealed as the vocal and performance mentor.

=== Auditions ===
The auditions were announced on 17 May 2018, along with a list of the 200 shortlisted mandopop/xinyao songs published on the Toggle website, participants were required to sing any one of the 200 songs during the audition. Auditions were held at nine different locations, which were either open to public (Open auditions) or held privately (Campus auditions). Similar to Campus SuperStar, auditions were open to students studying on a local institution with an age limit between 13 and 25 years old, and in a change to the former, Polytechnic and University students were also eligible to participate as well. Lee Teng did not appear after the Cineleisure open auditions onwards.

Summary of Open Auditions
Date(s)	Venue	Ambassador
21 May 2018	ITE College Central	Nathan Hartono
9 June 2018	Cathay Cineleisure Orchard	Nathan Hartono
16 June 2018	The Cathay	Joanna Dong

Summary of Campus Auditions
Date(s)	Venue	Ambassador
30 May 2018	Temasek Polytechnic	Joanna Dong
23 June 2018	Victoria Junior College	Boon Hui Lu
27 June 2018	Evergreen Secondary School	Joanna Dong
28 June 2018	Anglican High School	Boon Hui Lu
30 June 2018	Nanyang Junior College	Boon Hui Lu
7 July 2018	Pei Hwa Secondary School	Joanna Dong

The auditions required singers to enter an egg-shaped karaoke booth to perform a song of their choice. Their performance was recorded under video surveillance, which would be reviewed by the panel of judges after the auditions.

=== Short episodes ===
Several short videos of audition highlights were uploaded on Toggle starting on 7 June 2018. Another short episode, Fun With SPOP Sing! was broadcast on Mediacorp Channel 8 on 5 June 2018 at 9.50pm, right after the finale of Babies On Board. A Toggle-exclusive six-episode spin-off of the show, All About SPOP, premiered on 27 July, featuring celebrities and composers sharing their knowledge on Mandopop/xinyao music genre.

=== Marketing ===
The Committee to Promote Chinese Language Learning (CPCLL), a committee which promote Mandarin Chinese to Singapore, was the supporting partner of the show. Ambassador Hartono was among the ambassadors of CPCLL since 2017. Other sponsors include Bonia, Huawei, KFC, Mitsubishi Electric, Win2 Crackers and Simmons.

=== Revealing of the Top 20 contestants ===
On 16 July, the judges confirmed the Top 20 contestants who would advance to the live shows. The identities of the top 20 were revealed to public for the first time in a meet-and-greet session on 21 July at Cathay Cineleisure Orchard. The broadcast was streamed live on Channel 8's Facebook page.

=== SHINE Festival ===
The Top 20 contestants appeared at Shine Festival at OCBC Square on 4 August, where they sang "无底洞", "幸福不难", "王妃" and "不为谁而作的歌" in groups.

=== Non-competition episodes ===
Three non-competition episodes were aired during the season. A half-hour episode titled Prelude (SPOP 乐飞扬) was broadcast on 9 August on Mediacorp Channel 8 and Channel U after the 2018 National Day Parade, and re-ran on 19 August after the 2018 National Day Rally. It featured interviews from singers, songwriters and producers in Singapore's music industry, as well as the competition's ambassadors, and provided a brief introduction to each of the 20 contestants. The music video for the theme song, "听我唱响", as well as the show's new title card, premiered during this episode.

Two more were aired before the semi-final and grand finals on 28 October and 3 November, respectively. A half-hour episode aired before the semi-final, titled The Final 10 (十强SING人), featured the ten contestants on their preparation leading up to the semi-finals. A two-hour special aired the day before the grand finals, which features a compilation of performances, was titled Non-Stop Music (歌曲马拉松). Unlike the regular episodes, Non-Stop Music was not available for catch-up.

=== Pop-up Store Promotion ===
A SPOP Sing! promotional pop-up store appeared on Bugis Junction on 29 and 30 September 2018 in promotion of the show. Hosts Lee Teng and Gao Meigui appeared on the 29th, and YES 933 DJs Henry Law and Hazelle Teo appeared on the 30th.

=== Semi-finalist Meet-and-Greet ===
A second pop-up store was held on orchardgateway on 27 October and the semi-finalists appeared in a meet-and-greet session. The semi-finalists also appeared in Ngee Ann Plaza for guest performances in the Mediacorp Subaru Car Challenge.

=== Grand Finals Pre-show Showcase ===
A non-telecast pre-show music showcase was held at the Padang on 4 November at 4.00pm and featured local musicians Derrick Hoh and Trouze, Kelvin Tan, Desmond Ng, AL4HA, Kelly Poon, StellaVee (Stella Seah and Vee), The Apex Project, and Elton Lee.

== Contestants ==
After rounds of auditions, on 16 July, the judges selected and confirmed the final 20 finalists and revealed on 21 July. The 20 finalists, along with their Instagram handles, are as follows:

Key:

- – Winner
- – Runner-up
- – Third-place
- – Fourth place
- – Semi-finalist (lost audience's save)
- – Semi-finalist (bottom five)
- – Judges' Wildcard
- – Audience's Save

Name	Twitter Handle	Age	School	Quarter-Finals	Result
黄俊融 Jarrell Huang	@jarrellhuang	17	Singapore Polytechnic	1	Winner
郑骏杰 Marcus Tay	@XXMXRCS	21	LASALLE College of the Arts	2	Runner-up
莉玉 Daryl-Ann Jansen	@darylannjansen	20	Temasek Polytechnic	4	Third place
杨凯玲 Karena Yeo	@kandakwon	21	Murdoch University, Kaplan Singapore	4	Fourth place
黄彤欣 Celine Wong	@downtowncelinee	20	Ngee Ann Polytechnic	1	Semi-finalist
何鎔廷 He Rong Tin	@rongtinn	19	Hwa Chong Junior College	2	Semi-finalist
林延芯 Lim Yan Xin	@_yanxin_	21	University of Buffalo, Singapore Institute of Management	2	Semi-finalist
苏荟琦 Shermaine Saw	@Shermainesaw	14	Anglo-Chinese School (International)	3	Semi-finalist
张稙勤 Ally Teo	@ally_teo	13	St. Anthony's Canossian Secondary School	4	Semi-finalist
卓振声 Sherman Zhuo	@shermanzachary	22	Singapore Institute of Management	3	Semi-finalist
蔡佳潓 Charlene Chua	@babytobeat	16	Temasek Junior College	1	Eliminated
傅巧涵 Fu Qiao Han	@qiaohannn_	22	National University of Singapore	1	Eliminated
林佳藴 Jessica "Bunny" Lim	@bunnychap	23	Singapore Management University	3	Eliminated
林崇庆 Pheron Lim	@iamseekayyz	25	Management Development Institute of Singapore	3	Eliminated
胡护腾 Clayton Oh	@claysings	21	Temasek Polytechnic	1	Eliminated
傅伟健 Poh Wei Jian	@pohhhhhh)	24	University of London, Singapore Institute of Management	4	Eliminated
谢政哲 Darwin Shia	@darwinshia	24	Nanyang Technological University	2	Eliminated
卓康恩 Kenneth Toh	@kennethtohke	22	National University of Singapore	2	Eliminated
黄晚清 Renee Wang	@w.renee_	20	Singapore Institute of Technology	3	Eliminated
王柏淳 Raymond Wang	@BC_Bochun	18	Serangoon Junior College	4	Eliminated

^Note: All contestants' age reflected in the table are the ages at the time of their auditions until the Top 20 Reveal; a caret next to the age indicate singers turned one year older at the time before the prelude episode aired.

== Live Shows ==
The series consist of seven episodes (five one-hour quarter-finals, one 2.5-hour semi-finals, and one three-hour live broadcast grand finals), with the first episode first aired on Toggle via Toggle-It-First service (with free viewing, and captions were not added until the actual broadcast) on 21 September and on Mediacorp Channel 8 on 24 September, and ending on 4 November for both Toggle and Mediacorp Channel 8. Episodes rerun on Sundays at 2.30pm the week after the episode broadcast. The quarter-finals were taped and pre-recorded at the open field near *SCAPE, the semi-final episode was taped inside Capitol Theatre, and the grand finals at the Padang.

In a competition format which was previously seen on the fourth season of Campus Superstar, it was mandatory for contestants to perform renditions of songs (mentored by Serene Koong and directed by Jim Lim, with performances accompanied by live band Black Sakura) performed or composed by homegrown talents for the entire competition, hence the theme of the competition.

In contrary to most reality competitions involving public voting, the judges and the audience themselves made the decision to eliminate contestants from the competition, while members of the public were only allowed to cast their votes when the competition was left with the final two contestants to decide on the winner. This format was previously seen on another Singaporean singing competition, the second season of The Final 1.

Color key:

Contestant was advanced by judges
Contestant was saved by audience
Contestant was saved by judges
Contestant was eliminated
Contestant was eliminated without facing the audience's save

=== Week 1: Quarter Finals 1 ===
- air-date: 21 September 2018 (Toggle); 24 September 2018 (Mediacorp Channel 8)

For the first four quarter-finals (复赛), five contestants compete each week to vie for a place in the semi-final (半决赛). Prerecorded performances of each contestant's performance aired, as did the judges' selection (五选二) of two contestants from each group to advance to the semi-final. The remaining three contestants who were not chosen by the judges were placed under the "elimination zone" (淘汰区) and were in risk of elimination. After the judges' decided on the first two contestants, the open field audience will then cast their votes via their remote device to save one contestant from the "elimination zone" (SPOP抢救SING人) and that contestant had to compete again in the wildcard round (翻身赛). A new competition element, "popular index" (人气指数), was introduced, which is the open field audience's evaluation for a contestant's performance, though this does not necessarily influence the outcome of the competition, as the judges themselves select which contestants were to advance and which contestants were to eliminate.

For all episodes, Billy Koh and Peter Lee were the first two judges, while the third judge was rotated in each quarter-final, with singer Joi Chua taking on the first and third quarter-finals, and Jimmy Ye on the second and fourth quarter-finals; both singers joined as judges on the wildcard round.

Order	Contestant	Song	Popular index	Result
1	Clayton Oh	"那些你很冒险的梦"	65	Eliminated
2	Charlene Chua	"想着你的感觉"	87	Audience's save
3	Fu Qiao Han	"接受"	70	Eliminated
4	Jarrell Ng	"明知道"	79	Judge's choice
5	Celine Wong	"十万毫升泪水"	76	Judge's choice

Non-competition performance
Order	Performers	Song
1.1	Joanna Dong	"恋之憩"

=== Week 2: Quarter Finals 2 ===
- air-date: 28 September 2018 (Toggle); 1 October 2018 (Mediacorp Channel 8)

Order	Contestant	Song	Popular index	Result
1	Marcus Tay	"逆光"	82	Judge's choice
2	Kenneth Toh	"遗憾"	69	Eliminated
3	Lim Yan Xin	"天黑黑"	68	Judge's choice
4	Darwin Shia	"末日之恋"	66	Eliminated
5	He Rong Tin	"爱笑的眼睛"	84	Audience's save

Non-competition performance
Order	Performers	Song
2.1	Boon Hui Lu	"给我一个"

=== Week 3: Quarter Finals 3 ===
- air-date: 5 October 2018 (Toggle); 8 October 2018 (Mediacorp Channel 8)

Order	Contestant	Song	Popular index	Result
1	Renee Wang	"我恨我爱你"	68	Eliminated
2	Shermaine Saw	"爱是怀疑"	72	Judge's choice
3	Pheron Lim	"会有那么一天"	69	Audience's save
4	Jessica "Bunny" Lim	"踮起脚尖爱"	67	Eliminated
5	Sherman Toh	"身后"	89	Judge's choice

Non-competition performance
Order	Performers	Song
3.1	Nathan Hartono	"讨厌"

=== Week 4: Quarter Finals 4 ===
- air-date: 12 October 2018 (Toggle); 15 October 2018 (Mediacorp Channel 8)

At the end of the fourth quarter finals, it was announced that all judges agreed to bring back one further act who they felt should not have been eliminated on the quarter-finals; the singer was later revealed to be Karena Yeo.

Order	Contestant	Song	Popular index	Result
1	Karena Yeo	"不值得"	72	Judge's save
2	Poh Wei Jian	"柠檬草的味道"	65	Audience's save
3	Raymond Wang	"我感觉不到你"	81	Eliminated
4	Ally Teo	"我要快乐"	71	Judge's choice
5	Daryl-Ann Jansen	"幸福不难"	84	Judge's choice

=== Week 5: Quarter Finals 5- Wildcard round ===
- air-date: 19 October 2018 (Toggle); 22 October 2018 (Mediacorp Channel 8)

The five contestants who were recipients of the "audience's save" and "judge's save" from the first four weeks returned to the stage to perform for the wildcard round (dubbed as "Comeback round" in the captions). Like the previous quarter-finals, judges decide which two contestants advanced to the semi-finals. The "popular index" was discontinued from this round onward and was replaced with a scoring system, in which the top two scoring contestants advancing to the semi-finals, while the other three contestants were eliminated.

Order	Contestant	Song	Score	Result
1	Poh Wei Jian	"最近"	78	Eliminated
2	He Rong Tin	"同类"	86	Judge's choice
3	Karena Yeo	"可惜没如果"	85	Judge's choice
4	Pheron Lim	"开始懂了"	72	Eliminated
5	Charlene Chua	"担心"	73	Eliminated

Non-competition performance
Order	Performers	Song
5.1	Bonnie Loo	"听我唱响"

=== Week 6: Semi-Final ===
- air-date: 25 October 2018 (Toggle); 28 October 2018 (Mediacorp Channel 8)

Ten contestants performed two songs in this semi-final, one with a group (The judge's top three acts, Marcus Tay, Daryl-Ann Jansen, and Jarrell Ng, did a schoolyard-style pick to assign two/three more contestants to form their group) and another with a solo (ten of 11 songs were assigned by production and contestant picked the song by racing first to "snatch" their Huawei smartphones; "她说" was the only song unselected).

After each performance, two different set of scores were shown; one after the group's/every two solo performance (which is a given score from one of the three judges), and another after all the contestants have performed (average of all the judges' scores), with the latter accounted to the overall score. After the first round scores are revealed, each judge then picked one contestant from each group to receive a bonus score for their individual performance as a group (indicated in an orange background). The first round has a 30% weightage towards the overall score (all the members for the group received identical set of scores), and the second round covered the remaining 70%. Only the scores for the top five contestants were revealed (with their contestant's smartphone displaying the show's logo); contestants with the three highest combined scores will directly advance to the grand finals, while the two remaining contestants will compete for the fourth and final finalist via the "audience's save".

Mediacorp host (who was also the host of another S-pop themed competition SPOP Hurray!) Quan Yi Fong was officially introduced as the fourth host of SPOP Sing!, and Joi Chua served as the episode's third judge. Before the start of the second round, group performances (see non-competition performances below) were made to pay tribute to the late-xinyao singer Dawn Gan, who died on 22 September 2018.

Contestant	Order	Group Song	First score	Judge's score (points)	Order	Solo Song	First score	Overall score	Audience's votes	Result
Shermaine Saw	1	"让全世界起舞" (with Jarrell Ng and Ally Teo)	8.0	8.30 (2.49)	4	"王妃"	7.2	N/A (Unknown)		Eliminated (Bottom Five)
Jarrell Ng	1	"让全世界起舞" (with Shermaine Saw and Ally Teo)	8.0	8.30 (2.49)	9	"不潮不用花钱"	8.8	8.69	N/A (Top Three)	Judge's choice
Ally Teo	1	"让全世界起舞" (with Shermaine Saw and Jarrell Ng)	8.0	8.30 (2.49)	12	"Bring Me"	7.2	N/A (Unknown)		Eliminated (Bottom Five)
Sherman Toh	2	"如果你不小心想起我" (with Lim Yan Xin and Marcus Tay)	7.2	7.80 (2.34)	7	"人质"	7.8	N/A (Unknown)		Eliminated (Bottom Five)
Lim Yan Xin	2	"如果你不小心想起我" (with Sherman Toh and Marcus Tay)	7.2	7.80 (2.34)	11	"你给我听好"	7.9	N/A (Unknown)		Eliminated (Bottom Five)
Marcus Tay	2	"如果你不小心想起我" (with Sherman Toh and Lim Yan Xin)	7.2	7.80 (2.34)	13	"爱如潮水"	9.0	9.22	N/A (Top Three)	Judge's choice
Daryl-Ann Jansen	3	"我们是最好的朋友" (with He Rong Tin, Celine Wong and Karena Yeo)	8.8	8.77 (2.63)	5	"当世界只剩下一个人"	7.8	8.25	335	Audience's save
He Rong Tin	3	"我们是最好的朋友" (with Daryl-Ann Jansen, Celine Wong and Karena Yeo)	8.8	8.77 (2.63)	6	"别找我麻烦"	8.3	N/A (Unknown)		Eliminated (Bottom Five)
Celine Wong	3	"我们是最好的朋友" (with Daryl-Ann Jansen, He Rong Tin and Karena Yeo)	8.8	8.77 (2.63)	8	"逃亡"	8.1	8.43	321	Eliminated (Lost audience's save)
Karena Yeo	3	"我们是最好的朋友" (with Daryl-Ann Jansen, He Rong Tin and Celine Wong)	8.8	8.77 (2.63)	10	"信仰爱情"	8.2	8.53	N/A (Top Three)	Judge's choice

Non-competition performance
Order	Performers	Song
6.1	Billy Koh and Peter Lee	"毕业以后"
6.2	Jim Lim, Serene Koong and all 20 SPOP Sing! finalists	"水的话"/"月色同行"

=== Week 7: Grand Final ===
- air-date: 4 November 2018

Four finalists performed up to four songs in the live finale. Liang Wern Fook and Eric Moo were brought in as guest judges for the grand finals at the Padang (dubbed as "决战@Padang"). Unlike regular episodes, the grand final does not have captions (including the re-run), as it was a live broadcast.

Eliminations occur at the end of each round starting from round two, in which one contestant who received the lowest judge's score (scores are separate from each round) was eliminated. In round one, the contestant with the highest judge's score was exempt from performing (and immune from elimination in) round two. During the fourth and final round, online votes cast from the public (a 20-minute voting window which opened from 9.05pm) decide on which contestant will win SPOP Sing!.

Contestant	Order	Round 1 Song (Opening solo)	Score	Order	Round 2 Song (Celebrity's duet)	Score	Order	Round 3 Song (Judges' rendition)	Score	Order	Round 4 Song (Winner's song)	Result
Marcus Tay	1	"天使的指纹"	92	N/A (given bye)			8	"我会用真心填满你的孤单"	87.75	12	"你"	Runner-up
Karena Yeo	2	"Better Me"	82.45	5	"纪念" (with Kelly Poon)	85.5	N/A (already eliminated)					Fourth place
Daryl-Ann Jansen	3	"小人物的心声"	89.25	6	"雨天" (with Kelly Poon)	90	10	"解脱"	83.5	N/A (already eliminated)		Third place
Jarrell Ng	4	"代替"	89.75	7	"逞强" (with Desmond Ng)	92	9	"我不难过"	90.75	11	"听说爱情回来过"	Winner

Non-competition performance
Order	Performers	Song
7.1	Liang Wern Fook and Karena Yeo	"麻雀衔竹枝"
7.2	Joanna Dong	"喜欢你"
7.3	Joanna Dong and Daryl-Ann Jansen	"城里的月光"
7.4	Boon Hui Lu and Marcus Tay	"他来听我的演唱会"/"纸飞机"
7.5	Nathan Hartono	"无底洞"
7.6	Nathan Hartono and Jarrell Ng	"翅膀"
7.7	Liang Wern Fook and SPOP Sing! ambassadors	"细水长流"
7.8	All SPOP Sing! ambassadors and finalists (except Daryl-Ann Jansen, Marcus Tay, Jarrell Ng, and Karena Yeo)	"听我唱响"
7.9	Eric Moo and Joanna Dong	"邂逅"
7.10	Jarrell Ng	"逆风飞翔"

== Elimination chart ==
Color key:

Winner
Runner-up
Third place
Fourth place
Did not perform
Saved by the judges
Saved by the audience
Saved by production
Eliminated

SPOP Sing! - Eliminations
Contestant	Pl.	Quarterfinals (Note: The aforementioned dates were for the Toggle uploaded dates (with the exception for the Grand Finals, which is live-broadcast), three days before the televised broadcast on Mediacorp Channel 8.)					Semifinal (Note: The bottom five lowest-scoring contestants were announced to be eliminated immediately, then the top three highest-scoring contestants were announced as safe this week. The remaining two contestants faced the audience, who had to decide which contestant would be saved and which would be eliminated.)	Finale (Note: During the finale (top two round only), the public viewers voted for which finalist should win SPOP Sing!.)
Contestant	Pl.	9/21	9/28	10/5	10/12	10/19	10/26	11/4
Jarrell Ng	1	Safe	N/A	N/A	N/A	N/A	Safe	Winner
Marcus Tay	2	N/A	Safe	N/A	N/A	N/A	Safe	Runner-up
Daryl-Ann Jansen	3	N/A	N/A	N/A	Safe	N/A	Bottom two	Third place
Karena Yeo	4	N/A	N/A	N/A	Saved (Note: Yeo was brought in as a "judge's save" because the judges felt that she should not have been eliminated in the quarter-final.)	Safe	Safe	Fourth place
Celine Wong	5	Safe	N/A	N/A	N/A	N/A	Eliminated	
He Rong Tin	5	N/A	Bottom three	N/A	N/A	Safe	Eliminated (Bottom five)	
Lim Yan Xin	5	N/A	Safe	N/A	N/A	N/A	Eliminated (Bottom five)	
Shermaine Saw	5	N/A	N/A	Safe	N/A	N/A	Eliminated (Bottom five)	
Ally Teo	5	N/A	N/A	N/A	Safe	N/A	Eliminated (Bottom five)	
Sherman Toh	5	N/A	N/A	Safe	N/A	N/A	Eliminated (Bottom five)	
Charlene Chua	11	N/A	N/A	N/A	Bottom three	Eliminated		
Pheron Lim	11	Bottom three	N/A	N/A	N/A	Eliminated		
Poh Wei Jian	11	N/A	N/A	Bottom three	N/A	Eliminated		
Raymond Wang	14	N/A	N/A	N/A	Eliminated			
Jessica "Bunny" Lim	14	N/A	N/A	Eliminated				
Renee Wang	14	N/A	N/A	Eliminated				
Darwin Shia	14	N/A	Eliminated					
Kenneth Toh	14	N/A	Eliminated					
Fu Qiao Han	14	Eliminated						
Clayton Oh	14	Eliminated						

== Contestants' appearances on earlier talent shows ==
- Charlene Chua and Fu Qiao Han both participated in the second season of tvN's K-Pop Star Hunt and were chosen as top 16 contestants in the Singapore leg; both singers were eliminated in the regional finals and did not advance to the final 16.
- Jarrell Ng was a contestant on four shows prior to SPOP Sing!: in 2007, Ng won the singing competition segment on the inaugural season of The Sheng Siong Show. In 2009, he was among a child cast (who portrayed Huang Yixin) in the 2009 drama Together. In 2011, he participated on the first season of Chinese Million Star, where he finished in ninth place. In 2017, he appeared on the second season of Sound Of My Dream, but failed to receive mentorship from guest mentor Fish Leong.
- Celine Wong was a contestant under team Gary Chaw in the first season of The Voice Jue Zhan Hao Sheng, where she was eliminated during the battle rounds.

== Reception ==
SPOP Sing! had a viewership of more than 1.7 million throughout the season broadcast, which include 816,000 viewers watching from Toggle viewing service. The finals episode was met with critical reception as the live finale won the Star Awards for Best Variety Special during the 2019 Star Awards ceremony.

A spin-off, SPOP Wave! was aired in 2021.
