= Trisno (name) =

Trino is an Indo-Malayan masculine given name. Notable persons with that name include:

- Trisno Hendradi, an air vice-marshal of Indonesian Air Force
- Trisno Soemardjo (1916-1969), Indonesian writer, translator, and painter
- Trisno Ishak (born 1978), Singaporean musician and teacher
