= SPOP Wave! =

- Presented by: Kenneth Chung Kun Wah; Chen Ning
- Judges: Kit Chan; Paul Lee; Peter Lee; Kelly Yu; William Wei; Where Chou; Angela Zhang
- No. of contestants: 8
- Winner: Gao Meigui
- Winning mentor: The Freshmen
- Runner-up: Ridhwan Azman
- Location: Capitol Singapore
- Mentors: Hong Junyang; The Freshmen
- Companion show: SPOP Sing!
- No. of episodes: 8 (announced)

Release
- Original network: meLISTEN meWatch; YouTube; Channel 8 (preview); Channel U (preview)
- Original release: 2 November – 21 December 2021

SPOP Wave (Chinese: SPOP 艺起唱!; pinyin: SPOP Yì Qǐ Chàng) is a Singaporean Chinese singing reality competition featuring eight celebrities competing live in front of the nation and facing the judges who consist of various music professionals. It is a spin-off to the 2018's SPOP Sing! due to its similarities. The competition was streamed digitally on meLISTEN, meWatch LIVE and the Entertainment Mediacorp YouTube channel, which premiered on 2 November 2021.

The competition ended on 21 December 2021 with Gao Meigui (mentored by The Freshmen) named as the winner, while Ridhwan Azman (mentored by Hong Junyang) and Sherly Devonne Ng (mentored by The Freshmen) named as runner-up and third place, respectively.

== Development ==
SPOP Wave was first announced on 15 October 2021 on 8world and Mediacorp, revealing that eight celebrities would compete in eight weeks of competition to determine the best celebrity singer with several elements borrowed from other popular singing competitions. YES 933 radio actors Kenneth Chung and Chen Ning were announced as hosts, while Hong Junyang and The Freshmen were revealed as mentors to the celebrity contestants. On 21 October 2021, Kit Chan, Paul Lee and Peter Lee were revealed as resident judges to the competition, and on 27 October 2021, the panel was expanded with four international A-list artists as guest judges, namely Where Chou, Kelly Yu, William Wei and Angela Zhang.

A virtual livestream was held on 26 October through YES 933's social media, meListen and meWATCH live and a preview of the show was unveiled. A second livestream was held on 9 November through meListen and meWATCH as well as televised on Channel 8 and U. The entire competition was shot "live-to-tape" at Capitol Singapore, the site previously used for the semifinal.

Like the flagship competition, a mandatory rule requires all celebrities to sing songs featuring at least one Singaporean in either the lyrics, composition or arrangement.

== Sponsorship ==
None of the sponsors from SPOP Sing! returned to sponsor the show. The new sponsors were Powerhouse Karaoke, Osim International, Simmons, Nature Drops, KKBox and IMC Live Global, which was used for teleconferencing the guest judges at Shanghai as a result of the travel restrictions imposed due to the ongoing COVID-19 pandemic.

== Contestants ==
On 29 October, the eight celebrities were unveiled but they are not explicitly known, and they have been masked as digital avatars and altered microphone keys to conceal their identities. Among the cast announced, six out of eight had previously competed in singing competitions (four of which are from Singapore), five with prior acting roles, a radio DJ, a former getai singer, a YouTube personality and a chef. These eight singers were revealed on two shows on 2 and 9 November, as follows:

- – Winner
- – Runner-up
- – Third place

| Name | Avatar | Mentor/Team | Known for | Result |
|---|---|---|---|---|
| Gao Mei Gui 高美贵 | Panda | Team Freshmen | YES 933 radio anchor and singer | Winner |
| Ridhwan Azman 任毅翔 | Lion | Team Junyang | YouTube personality/singer | Runner-up |
| Sherly Devonne Ng 黄艺萱 | Otter | Team Freshmen | That Girl in Pinafore and Tanglin actress | Third place |
| Leon Lim 林纯隆 | Hamburger | Team Freshmen | MasterChef Singapore season 2 runner-up | 4th place |
| Rao Zi Jie 饒梓杰 | Xuanfeng Pig | Team Junyang | Singer/actor | 5th place |
| Kele Lau 阳光可乐 | Lucky Dog | Team Junyang | Stage hostess/singer | 6th place |
| Jeremy Chan 田铭耀 | Angry Bomb | Team Freshmen | Stage host/singer | 7th/8th place |
| Aden Tan 陈昱志 | Baby Shark | Team Junyang | Singer/actor | 7th/8th place |

== Competition summary ==
Live shows color key
| Celebrity was safe |
| Celebrity was at risk of elimination/saved by the mentor |
| Celebrity was at risk of elimination but declared saved |
| Celebrity earned immunity/immune from elimination |
| Celebrity was eliminated |

=== Week 1 & 2 - Hidden Identity Singer (2 and 9 November) ===
The eight celebrities are revealed for the first time in a similar unmasking format in the Masked Singer franchise, with the first week revealing the four celebrities from Team Freshmen while the second week saw the debut of four Team Junyang's celebrities, hence both weeks are non-elimination. A list of songs are determined by an online vote from 15 to 20 October and the songs were announced on 27 October. Kenneth Chung was not present for hosting during the first three weeks of shows.

| Episode | Team | Order | Singer | Song | Score |
|---|---|---|---|---|---|
| Episode 1 (2 November 2021) | Team Freshmen | 1 | Sherly Devonne Ng 黄艺萱 | "空白格" | 66.6 |
| Episode 1 (2 November 2021) | Team Freshmen | 2 | Jeremy Chan 田铭耀 | "到时见" | 75 |
| Episode 1 (2 November 2021) | Team Freshmen | 3 | Gao Mei Gui 高美贵 | "我" | 88.3 |
| Episode 1 (2 November 2021) | Team Freshmen | 4 | Leon Lim 林纯隆 | "迟" | 83.3 |
| Episode 2 (9 November 2021) | Team Junyang | 5 | Aden Tan 陈昱志 | "马德里不思议" | 78.3 |
| Episode 2 (9 November 2021) | Team Junyang | 6 | Ridhwan Azman 任毅翔 | "双栖动物" | 88.6 |
| Episode 2 (9 November 2021) | Team Junyang | 7 | Kele Lau 阳光可乐 | "爱情字典" | 63.3 |
| Episode 2 (9 November 2021) | Team Junyang | 8 | Rao Zi Jie 饒梓杰 | "刻在我心底的名字" | 71.6 |

=== Week 3 - Quarterfinal 1- Duets (16 November) ===
In this round, the eight celebrities are each divided into four pairs of duets by their mentors to perform a song, with the order of performance decided by the celebrities with the highest scores from the preliminary round. After both duets, the pair with a higher score are declared safe, while the losing pair are at risk of elimination, as the mentor had to eliminate one celebrity. Kelly Yu served as the guest judge.

| Team | Order | Singer | Song | Score | Result |
|---|---|---|---|---|---|
| Team Junyang | 1 | Kele Lau 阳光可乐 | "天黑请闭眼" | 78 | Safe |
| Team Junyang | 1 | Ridhwan Azman 任毅翔 | "天黑请闭眼" | 78 | Safe |
| Team Junyang | 2 | Aden Tan 陈昱志 | "凭什么" | 75 | Eliminated |
| Team Junyang | 2 | Rao Zi Jie 饒梓杰 | "凭什么" | 75 | Mentor Save |
| Team Freshmen | 3 | Gao Mei Gui 高美贵 | "除此之外" | 87 | Safe |
| Team Freshmen | 3 | Leon Lim 林纯隆 | "除此之外" | 87 | Safe |
| Team Freshmen | 4 | Sherly Devonne Ng 黄艺萱 | "接受" | 79.25 | Mentor Save |
| Team Freshmen | 4 | Jeremy Chan 田铭耀 | "接受" | 79.25 | Eliminated |

=== Week 4 - Quarterfinal 2- Team Battle (23 November) ===
In this episode, teams collaborated and performed a medley of three songs in unison (the order are based on the celebrity's role as a lead singer for the respective song from the medley). After both performances, the judges will then vote for the team who performed better. The losing team (either with a minority of votes or in the case of a deadlock, a lower score) will have one team member eliminated by decision from the mentor. Teams participated in a pop quiz (based on the celebrities' profiles, in a series of quizzes) presented by the hosts; teams took turns answer as many questions in 40 seconds, and the team with the most questions correct will decide the performance order. William Wei served as the guest judge.

| Team | Order | Singer | Song | Judges' votes | | | | Judges' score | Result |
| Team | Order | Singer | Song | Paul | Kit | Peter | William | Judges' score | Result |
|---|---|---|---|---|---|---|---|---|---|
| Team Junyang | 1 | Kele Lau 阳光可乐 | "绿光"/"如燕"/"心牆" | | | | | 321 | Eliminated |
| Team Junyang | 1 | Ridhwan Azman 任毅翔 | "绿光"/"如燕"/"心牆" | | | | | 321 | Mentor's Save |
| Team Junyang | 1 | Rao Zi Jie 饒梓杰 | "绿光"/"如燕"/"心牆" | | | | | 321 | Mentor's Save |
| Team Freshmen | 2 | Gao Mei Gui 高美贵 | "开始懂了"/"电话"/"爱是怀疑" | | | | | 336 | Safe |
| Team Freshmen | 2 | Leon Lim 林纯隆 | "开始懂了"/"电话"/"爱是怀疑" | | | | | 336 | Safe |
| Team Freshmen | 2 | Sherly Devonne Ng 黄艺萱 | "开始懂了"/"电话"/"爱是怀疑" | | | | | 336 | Safe |

=== Week 5 - Quarterfinal 3- Mixed Battle (30 November) ===
In the third week of the quarterfinals, one celebrity performed a song of their choice and are put through the "hot seat" (represented as a bar stool). For every subsequent performance, the celebrity tries to beat the score from incumbent in the "hot seat"; if the score is higher, the celebrity is safe and is seated on the "comfy seat" (represented as four gaming chairs); otherwise, the incumbent on the "hot seat" is unseated to replace the celebrity on the "hot seat". The celebrity who remained in the "hot seat" (meaning the lowest score) at the end of all the performances is eliminated from the competition. Angela Chang served as the guest judge.

| Team | Order | Singer | Song | Score | Result |
|---|---|---|---|---|---|
| Team Junyang | 1 | Ridhwan Azman 任毅翔 | "我不难过" | 69.5 | Safe |
| Team Freshmen | 2 | Gao Mei Gui 高美贵 | "二人同行" | 77 | Safe |
| Team Junyang | 3 | Rao Zi Jie 饒梓杰 | "亲爱的做个好梦" | 67.5 | Eliminated |
| Team Freshmen | 4 | Sherly Devonne Ng 黄艺萱 | "讨厌" | 82 | Safe |
| Team Freshmen | 5 | Leon Lim 林纯隆 | "我恨我爱你" | 79.9 | Safe |

=== Week 6 - Quarterfinal 4- Mystery Guest Singer PK (7 December) ===
In the fourth and final Quarterfinals, each celebrity challenged against a mystery guest singer with the identity unknown to the singer prior to the start of each song; the mystery singer's represented as Drogon (billed as "fierce dragon") during introduction, later revealed as Kelvin Tan. The mystery singer sang "心如刀刻" and sets a target score of 86; one-at-a-time, celebrities will attempt to beat the score. All the scores are not revealed until all the celebrities have performed; if at least one celebrity managed to beat Tan's score, the week became non-elimination, and the celebrity with the highest score would earn immunity and immediately advance to the finals, otherwise, the celebrity with the lowest score would face elimination. Where Chou served as the guest judge.

| Team | Order | Singer | Song | Score | Result |
|---|---|---|---|---|---|
| Team Freshmen | 1 | Gao Mei Gui 高美贵 | "人间烟火" | 87.75 | Advanced |
| Team Freshmen | 2 | Sherly Devonne Ng 黄艺萱 | "对爱渴望" | 83.75 | Safe |
| Team Junyang | 3 | Ridhwan Azman 任毅翔 | "My Little Princess" | 82.75 | Safe |
| Team Freshmen | 4 | Leon Lim 林纯隆 | "疼憨人" | 79.25 | Saved |

=== Week 7 - Semifinal- Guest Duets (14 December) ===
Each celebrity partnered with a guest singer to perform a duet. The scores received for this round will influence the order of performance during the finale. With the previous week's being non-elimination and Gao being immune from elimination (and exempting her from the semifinal), the celebrity with the lowest score for this round will face elimination.

| Avatar/Team | Order | Singer | Partner | Song | Score | Result |
|---|---|---|---|---|---|---|
| Team Freshmen | 1 | Leon Lim 林纯隆 | Jimmy Yap | "假面的告白" | 80 | Eliminated |
| Team Junyang | 2 | Ridhwan Azman 任毅翔 | Olivia Ong | "梦想起飞" | 84.3 | Safe |
| Team Freshmen | 3 | Sherly Devonne Ng 黄艺萱 | Serene Koong | "幸福不难" | 81 | Safe |

In the finale broadcast, surprise guest singer JJ Lin made an appearance to advise on the finalists.

=== Week 8 - Finale (21 December) ===
Each celebrity sang two songs, one uptempo and one ballad, and during the finals, a voting window opens during the live shows until 9.15 pm on meListen's YES 933's page. Both the public vote (for up to three) and the judges scores are given equal say, and the celebrity who received a higher combined score will win SPOP Wave!. William Wei returned as a guest judge while Jim Lim, the musical director, made an appearance in the finale.

| Team | Singer | Order | Uptempo song | Order | Ballad song | Public vote rank | Result |
|---|---|---|---|---|---|---|---|
| Team Freshmen | Sherly Devonne Ng 黄艺萱 | 1 | "王妃" | 6 | "你好不好" | 3rd | Third place |
| Team Freshmen | Gao Mei Gui 高美贵 | 2 | "慢慢来" | 4 | "像天堂的悬崖" | 1st | Winner |
| Team Junyang | Ridhwan Azman 任毅翔 | 3 | "Show Your Love" | 5 | "天黑" | 2nd | Runner-up |

Non-competition performance
| Order | Performers | Song |
|---|---|---|
| 8.1 | Top 8 celebrities | "听我唱响" |
| 8.2 | William Wei | "如果可以" |
| 8.3 | Jarrell Huang | "触电" |

== Elimination chart ==
Color key:

Team Freshmen
Team Junyang
Winner
Runner-up
Third place
Did not perform
Saved by the judges
Advanced
Immune from elimination
Saved by the mentor
Saved/lowest score
Eliminated

Results per stage
| Place | Contestant | Preliminary (Note: Both weeks of the preliminary rounds were non-elimination. The placements reflected in the column are the placements for each contestant during the episode.) | | Quarterfinal 1 | Quarterfinal 2 (Note: The judges' vote resulted in a tie. Per the competition rules, the team with a higher judges' score is used for resolving a tie.) | Quarterfinal 3 | Quarterfinal 4 (Note: During the fourth Quarter-finals, the celebrities then compete to best the target score of 86 to determine the fate for this week's shows. If at least one celebrity was successful, the week became non-elimination and the celebrity with a higher score won immunity and was exempt in the semifinals; otherwise, eliminations for this week ran ahead as normal. Gao was the only celebrity to beat the target score to win her immunity, and thus saving Lim from elimination.) | Semifinal | Finale (Note: During the finale, both judge's scores and the public viewers voted for which finalist should win SPOP Wave!.) |
| Place | Contestant | 11/2 | 11/9 | 11/16 | 11/23 | 11/30 | 12/7 | 12/14 | 12/21 |
|---|---|---|---|---|---|---|---|---|---|
| 1 | Gao Mei Gui 高美贵 | 1st | N/A | Safe | Safe | Safe | Advanced | Immune | Winner |
| 2 | Ridhwan Azman 任毅翔 | N/A | 1st | Safe | Mentor save | Safe | Safe | Safe | Runner-up |
| 3 | Sherly Devonne Ng 黄艺萱 | 4th | N/A | Mentor save | Safe | Safe | Safe | Safe | Third place |
| 4 | Leon Lim 林纯隆 | 2nd | N/A | Safe | Safe | Safe | Saved | Eliminated | |
| 5 | Rao Zi Jie 饒梓杰 | N/A | 3rd | Mentor save | Mentor save | Eliminated | | | |
| 6 | Kele Lau 阳光可乐 | N/A | 4th | Safe | Eliminated | | | | |
| 7-8 | Jeremy Chan 田铭耀 | 3rd | N/A | Eliminated | | | | | |
| 7-8 | Aden Tan 陈昱志 | N/A | 2nd | Eliminated | | | | | |

== Reception ==
The set with wrinkled curtains, which was seen in the first two episodes, was criticized by viewers after the first episode aired, with comments such as "derogatory" and "unprofessional setting" in the background. The set was modified from episode three onwards, with the curtains removed and the position of the judging panel aligned parallel to the audience's row.

The elimination of Jeremy Chan after episode three had also been criticized, citing either as a technical foul on competition rules, or its format as either confusing or inconsistent, but the production had replied on the controversy as the competition rules had already been explained during the show, and had been followed accordingly.

The naming of Gao Meigui as the champion was also criticized as being rigged, as she was a DJ with YES 933 at the time of the show's airing.
