= List of Together (TV series) episodes =

Below is an episodic synopsis of Together, which consists of 36 episodes and broadcast on MediaCorp Channel 8.

== Episodes ==
No.	Title	Original airdate	Encore airdate
1	"Episode 1"	November 30, 2009	February 16, 2011
2	"Episode 2"	December 1, 2009	February 17, 2011
3	"Episode 3"	December 2, 2009	February 18, 2011
4	"Episode 4"	December 3, 2009	February 21, 2011
5	"Episode 5"	December 4, 2009	February 22, 2011
6	"Episode 6"	December 7, 2009	
7	"Episode 7"	December 8, 2009	February 24, 2011
8	"Episode 8"	December 9, 2009	February 25, 2011
9	"Episode 9"	December 10, 2009	February 28, 2011
10	"Episode 10"	December 11, 2009	March 1, 2011
11	"Episode 11"	December 14, 2009	March 2, 2011
12	"Episode 12"	December 15, 2009	March 3, 2011
13	"Episode 13"	December 16, 2009	March 4, 2011
14	"Episode 14"	December 17, 2009	March 7, 2011
15	"Episode 15"	December 18, 2009	March 8, 2011
16	"Episode 16"	December 21, 2009	March 9, 2011
17	"Episode 17"	December 22, 2009	March 10, 2011
18	"Episode 18"	December 23, 2009	March 11, 2011
19	"Episode 19"	December 24, 2009	March 14, 2011
20	"Episode 20"	December 25, 2009	March 15, 2011
21	"Episode 21"	December 28, 2009	March 16, 2011
22	"Episode 22"	December 29, 2009	March 17, 2011
23	"Episode 23"	December 30, 2009	March 18, 2011
24	"Episode 24"	December 31, 2009	March 21, 2011
25	"Episode 25"	January 1, 2010	March 22, 2011
26	"Episode 26"	January 4, 2010	March 23, 2011
27	"Episode 27"	January 5, 2010	March 24, 2011
28	"Episode 28"	January 6, 2010	March 25, 2011
29	"Episode 29"	January 7, 2010	March 28, 2011
30	"Episode 30"	January 8, 2010	March 29, 2011
31	"Episode 31"	January 11, 2010	March 30, 2011
32	"Episode 32"	January 12, 2010	March 31, 2011
33	"Episode 33"	January 13, 2010	April 1, 2011
34	"Episode 34"	January 14, 2010	April 4, 2011
35	"Episode 35"	January 15, 2010	April 5, 2011
36	"Finale"	January 18, 2010	April 6, 2011

== See also ==
- List of programmes broadcast by MediaCorp Channel 8
- Together
