= School of the Arts, Singapore =

Independent school in Singapore

School of the Arts
- 新加坡艺术学院 (Chinese); Sekolah Seni Singapura (Malay) சிங்கப்பூர்க் கலைப்பள்ளி (Tamil)

Location
- 1 Zubir Said Drive; 227968; Singapore
- 1°17′57″N 103°50′55″E

Information
- School type: Specialised independent
- Established: 2 January 2008
- School code: 7802
- Chairman: Loh Lik Peng
- Principal: Goh Meei Yunn
- Gender: Mixed
- Age range: 13–18
- Enrollment: 1,200
- Education system: International Baccalaureate
- Campus size: 13 acres (5.3 ha)
- Website: www.sota.edu.sg

School of the Arts (SOTA) is a specialised independent school in Singapore, offering a six-year integrated arts and academic curriculum leading to an International Baccalaureate diploma or career-related programme.

SOTA is an agency of the Ministry of Culture, Community and Youth.

== History ==
On 25 November 2002, Minister for Education and Second Minister for Defence Teo Chee Hean presented the findings and recommendations from the Junior College/Upper Secondary Education Review Committee in the 10th Parliament of Singapore. One of the recommendations proposed by the committee included establishing specialised schools in mathematics, science, sports, and the arts, to diversify the education landscape. As such, on 12 August 2003, the Ministry of Information, Communications and the Arts (abbreviated as MICA, now known as MDDI) appointed Lee Tzu Yang as chairman of the Arts School Committee, to study the needs and feasibility of establishing a specialised school in arts.

On 12 March 2004, the Report of the Committee on Specialised Arts School was presented to MITA. The recommendation of establishing a specialised school in arts was accepted by the MITA, and announced in the 10th Parliament of Singapore on the next day. Auditions for places in the inaugural intake began in November 2006, and due to an overwhelming response, more auditions were held up until July 2007. In total, more than 1,000 students attended the auditions. On 2 January 2008, Minister for Information, Communications and the Arts Lee Boon Yang officiated the opening of SOTA at its interim campus at 90 Goodman Road, with more than 200 students forming the inaugural batch. The first principal was Rebecca Chew, former principal of Naval Base Secondary School, and the first chairman was Lee Tzu Yang.

== Curriculum ==
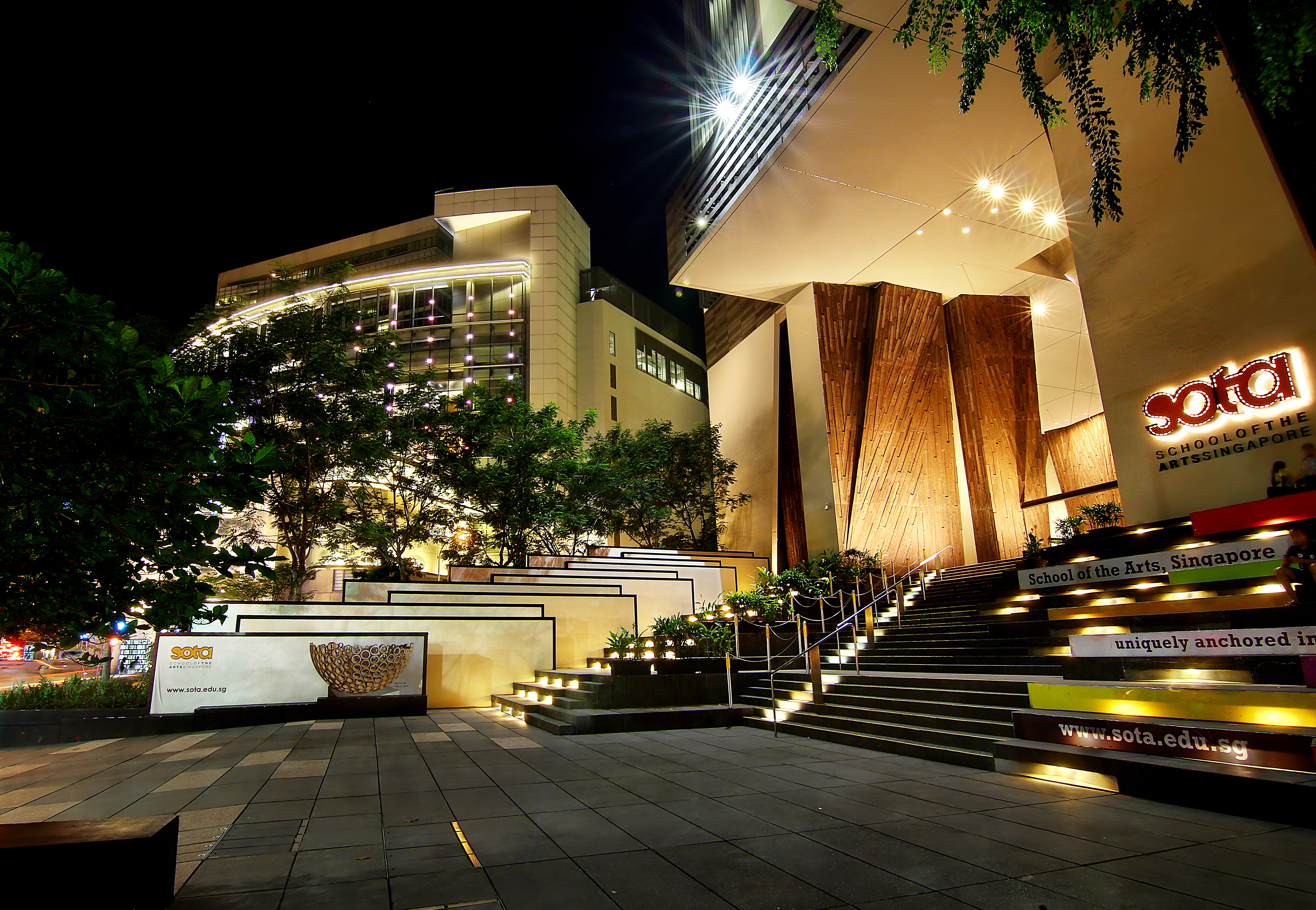
SOTA in 2013

Admissions to SOTA is conducted solely via the Direct School Admission (DSA) scheme for secondary schools, and around 200 students are admitted in each intake. In 2010, SOTA also joined the DSA scheme for junior colleges, admitting a small group of students to its Year 5 cohort.

SOTA offers a six-year International Baccalaureate (IB) arts and academic curriculum, leading to an IB Diploma Programme (IBDP) or IB Career-related Programme (IBCP). The first batch of IBDP and IBCP students graduated in 2012 and 2015 respectively. In 2011, SOTA partnered with Louis Vuitton to develop a visual arts programme as part of the curriculum, benefiting more than 60 visual arts students. On 5 July 2012, SOTA signed a memorandum of understanding with Nanyang Academy of Fine Arts (NAFA), allowing students to transfer to NAFA and complete diploma and degree programmes in a shorter period of time.

Announced on 6 June 2022, IB collaborated with SOTA to develop a new literary arts course, as part of the school-based syllabus under the IB Group 6 subjects. From January 2023, the course was introduced for teaching, and will begin assessments in November 2024.

== Campus ==
The 13-acre (5.3 ha) campus is located at 1 Zubir Said Drive in Bras Basah, along the foot of Mount Sophia. Announced by acting Minister for Information, Communications and the Arts Lui Tuck Yew on 8 May 2009, the address of the campus was named in honour of Zubir Said. Costing S$145 million, construction of the permanent campus was completed in 2009, and SOTA moved in on 4 January 2010.

== Notable alumni ==
- Regina Song – Singaporean singer-songwriter
- Rhyu – Singaporean singer-songwriter

== Principals ==
Name of principal	Years served	Notes
Rebecca Chew	2008–2012	
Lim Geok Cheng	2013–2018	
Mary Seah	2019–2025	
Goh Meei Yunn	2026–present	
