= Mediacorp Subaru Impreza WRX Challenge =

Annual motorsport challenge in Singapore

Last Palm Standing - Mediacorp Subaru Car Challenge (Chinese 中文: 比耐力贏轎車比賽) is an annual challenge organised by Mediacorp Radio and Subaru in Singapore. It has been held at the open air space in front of Ngee Ann City since its inauguration on 17 November 2002.

== Format ==
Contestants are required to reach the competition site at 7 am of the competition day for registration, which is always on a Saturday. The competition then begins later at 1 pm, and contestant's hands are assigned to one of the car positions by random and s/he will attempt to outlast by holding on to the car for as long as possible. Contestants are eliminated from the competition once the hand, whether deliberately or accidentally, was lifted off from the car; but they are allowed to release their hand during the five-minute break (occurring every six hours), or any temporary suspension in the event of unfavourable weather (i.e. lightning/thunderstorm) per safety reasons. Contestants can also be disqualified if they were caught breaching rules, such as violence, cheating, or using any communication devices during the challenge. The competition continues until only one contestant was left standing, which will then be crowned the winner and the Subaru Impreza prize.

In the first six years of competition, only Singaporean contestants are eligible to compete. Since 2008, as part of the "Regional Face-off" (2009 as "Asian Face-off") theme, international contestants are made eligible to participate, starting from Hong Kong, Malaysia, Philippines and Thailand, followed by China, Indonesia and Taiwan in 2009, Vietnam in 2010, Cambodia and Macau in 2011.

== Highlights ==
In 2005, the competition was called the "Subaru Team Challenge", as it was a competition by teams consisting of two people per team; if either team member releases their hand, the team would be eliminated. The last team standing was awarded the car, one per each team member. One of the team members of the runner-up team would later go to win the competition the following year in 2006, marking the first returning contestant to win the competition.

In 2007, the competition was called the "Battle of the Sexes", featuring male and female contestants competing for the car; it was the only competition to date (excluding teams or regional winners) to have co-winners.

2008 was the first competition to feature international contestants from the Southeast Asian region, before expanding to Asia on the following year. 2008 marks the first time in the Challenge's history the competition have to be temporarily suspended due to unfavourable weather; a lightning strike occurred on Sunday morning at 5:07 am and was suspended for 46 minutes.

In 2012, as a commemoration to the 11th edition of Subaru Challenge, 11 seconds are added to the usual five-minute evening break at 7 pm. The last eleven contestants would be awarded a "Wild Card", allowing contestants to select from an array of items or taking an extra break. Due to the extreme afternoon heat, an additional break was called at 4 pm on the Sunday/Monday of the competition. 2012 saw its first non-Singaporean contestant to finish in the top three.

2013 marked the second time a competition was temporarily suspended due to weather, which lasted for 70 minutes starting at 4:30 pm on Monday.

In 2014, public played an online game to stand a chance to win an additional break to be given to their contestant of choice. Top ten players with the highest scores (after each Reward round) was awarded the same prize. Since this edition, the last 15 contestants were also entitled an extra break at 10 am, 4 pm and 10 pm. The winning contestant, at 82 hours and 16 minutes of endurance, set the current record of time a contestant was able to outlast.

In 2015, in commemoration with the golden jubilee, a Certificate of Entitlement was also awarded to the winner, making it the most expensive grand prize to be won at around S$115,000; if the winner is not Singaporean, the COE would not be awarded. 2015 marked the first time a non-Singaporean (from Vietnam) had won the competition, and was also the first time the competition was sheltered in a tent with standby air-conditioning, due to the Southeast Asian haze.

2016 returned the competition of "The Asian Face-off" with a S$69,600 Subaru XV 1.6 I-S awarded to the winning contestant out of 400 participated (300 were Singaporeans, 10 from each one of eight participating Asian countries, and 20 contestants selected from the Motor Image's "I LOVE SUBARU" and "DUO Rewards" fan Facebook page). The COE bonus prize seen in the 2015 edition was absent until 2018.

2017 saw the longest suspension of competition in history which lasted 1 hour 45 minutes, when thunderstorms happened on Monday 7:30 pm.

2018 saw the return of the COE bonus, which was awarded to the winning contestant who could surpass the imposed current record (82 hours and 16 minutes). Contestants are also awarded a $100 bonus for passing certain milestones at 48, 60 and 72 hours. In addition to guest performances (including SPOP Sing! semi-finalists), phone-call donations are also featured in the series as well. The competition also saw three suspensions, the most for any competition in history, all due to wet weather.

2019's installment, dubbed Last Palm Standing, also saw the return of bonus milestones and COE award for the last racer surpassing the current record timing. A pre-competition roadshow was held at Cathay Cineleisure on 31 August, which also allow competitors to register for the event.

Both the 2020 and 2021 installment were the first two installments to be cancelled as a result of the COVID-19 pandemic.

== Winners and runners-up ==
| Year | Date | Overall winner(s) | Time Taken | First Runner-up | Second Runner-up |
|---|---|---|---|---|---|
| 2002 | 17 November 2002 | Mohhamad Amat | 61 hours 55 minutes | Zech Leong | |
| 2003 | 1 November 2003 | David Gerard Felix | 66 hours 52 minutes | Cindy Png Siew Guat | |
| 2004 | 30 October 2004 | Ian Lee | 74 hours 59 minutes | Cheang Pui San | |
| 2005 | 5 November 2005 | Koh Meng Khoon & Lung Wen Jie | 64 hours 31 minutes | Zac Ng & Alex Koh | |
| 2006 | 4 November 2006 | Alex Koh | 73 hours 56 minutes | Johnny Chua | |
| 2007 | 3 November 2007 | Sandra Yeow (female); Kevin Lee^{1} (male) | 77 hours 13 minutes 76 hours ^{1} | Phua Lee Lian (female); Abdul Hamid Jonid (male) | |
| 2008 | 8 November 2008 | (Singapore) George Lee | 81 hours 32 minutes | (Singapore) Mary Tan | (Singapore) Ong Chai Har Rose |
| 2009 | 31 October 2009 | (Singapore) Mohd Anuar | 77 hours 43 minutes | (Singapore) Santozkumar Poonsolai | (Singapore) Yeo Shu Qing |
| 2010 | 30 October 2010 | (Singapore) Aloysius Lim Xiang Kwan | 75 hours 17 minutes | (Singapore) Abdul Hamid Jonid | (Singapore) Analiza Mokhtar |
| 2011 | 29 October 2011 | (Singapore) Chong Kait Chi | 75 hours 36 minutes | (Singapore) Tilani Haresh Lachmandas | (Singapore) Abdul Hamid Jonid |
| 2012 | 27 October 2012 | (Singapore) Tholmas Gan Yu Shen | 78 hours 30 minutes | (Singapore) G Jaishanker | (Thailand) Samach Tepsen |
| 2013 | 26 October 2013 | (Singapore) Yusman Wright | 75 hours 1 minute | (Singapore) Sunawr Ali | (Philippines) Alex Neblasca |
| 2014 | 8 November 2014 | (Singapore) G Jaishanker | 82 hours 16 minutes | (Singapore) Analiza Mokhtar | (Singapore) Sunawr Ali |
| 2015 | 31 October 2015 | (Vietnam) Nguyen Phuoc Huynh | 77 hours 58 minutes | (Malaysia) Tan Hong Sheng | (Singapore) Yip Yu Wai |
| 2016 | 5 November 2016 | (Singapore) Sunawr Ali | 75 hours 58 minutes | (Singapore) Analiza Mokhtar | (Philippines) Alex Neblasca |
| 2017 | 28 October 2017 | (Singapore) Abdul Hamid Jonid | 74 hours 15 minutes | (Vietnam) Luan Tu Lang | (Philippines) Filmark Ramos Bernante |
| 2018 | 27 October 2018 | (Singapore) Analiza Mokhtar | 75 hours 17 minutes 58 seconds | (Thailand) Phraitoon Sanguannam | (Singapore) Mazlinah Ahmad |
| 2019 | 2 November 2019 | (Thailand) Siripong Toosadee | 76 hours 55 minutes 5 seconds | (Vietnam) Luu Van Quoc | (Singapore) Mazlinah Ahmad |
| 2020 | Cancelled due to COVID-19 pandemic | | | | |
| 2021 | Cancelled due to COVID-19 pandemic | | | | |
| 2022 | Cancelled due to COVID-19 pandemic | | | | |
| 2023 | 4 Nov 2023 | (Singapore) Mr. Chan Kok Seng | elimination game | (Vietnam) Nguyen Doan Tho | (Vietnam) Do Dang Hoang Trung |

^Note : Lee was declared the winner of the men's category at 73 hours 55 minutes, and finished in fourth place overall.

== Market Team Winner and Asian Winner ==
Since 2009, the market whose participants have the longest combined standing time will be awarded the Market Team Winner title along with a cash prize of S$10,000, to be equally divided among the team. An additional S$5,000 was awarded to the last male and female contestant standing, and S$1,000 for the last contestant standing representing in each country.

| Year | Market Team Winner | Asian Winner |
|---|---|---|
| 2009 | Thailand | |
| 2010 | Philippines | Thailand |
| 2011 | Thailand | Philippines |
| 2012 | Vietnam | Thailand |
| 2013 | Philippines | |
| 2014 | Thailand | Malaysia |
| 2015 | Malaysia | |
| 2016 | Philippines | |
| 2017 | Vietnam | |
| 2018 | Thailand | |
| 2019 | Philippines | Thailand |
| 2020 | Cancelled due to COVID-19 pandemic | |
| 2021 | Cancelled due to COVID-19 pandemic | |
