= Together (Singaporean TV series) =

- 当我们同在一起
- Genre: Period drama
- Created by: Ang Eng Tee 洪荣狄
- Written by: Ang Eng Tee 洪荣狄
- Directed by: Chia Mien Yang 谢敏洋; Chong Liung Man 张龙敏; Lai Lee Thin 赖丽婷; Loo Yin Kam 卢燕金; Tay Peck Choo 郑碧珠
- Starring: Jeanette Aw; Dai Xiangyu; Elvin Ng; Eelyn Kok; Zhang Zhenxuan; Zhou Ying
- Opening theme: 我们 by Kelvin Tan
- Ending theme: 我们之间 by Joi Chua
- Country of origin: Singapore
- Original language: Chinese
- No. of episodes: 36

Production
- Producer: Chia Mien Yang 谢敏洋
- Running time: approx. 45 minutes per episode

Original release
- Network: MediaCorp Channel 8
- Release: 30 November 2009 – 18 January 2010

Together (Chinese: 当我们同在一起, literally "When We Are Together") is a Singaporean Chinese drama produced in 2009. It was telecasted on Singapore's free-to-air channel, MediaCorp Channel 8. It stars Jeanette Aw, Dai Xiangyu, Elvin Ng, Eelyn Kok, Zhang Zhenxuan and Zhou Ying as the casts for the series. It is MediaCorp's 46th anniversary year-end blockbuster drama, and was sponsored by the Media Development Authority of Singapore. It made its debut on 30 November 2009 and ended on 18 January 2010. This drama serial consists of 36 episodes, and was screened on every weekday night at 9:00 pm.

The series title also refers to the children's folk song "The More We Get Together" and the tune is played during the interlude and in the introduction of the theme song.

== Plot ==
The story begins in 1967. During that year, Singapore first issued their own currency and made national service mandatory for all young Singaporean males who have come of age 18 years old. That year, there were people who rented out fake eyelashes for S$4 a day; prices of eggs plummeted to a new low, propelling Singaporeans to start a movement to kill chickens to reduce egg-supply. That year, the “Vietnam Rose” (a form of syphilis) set foot on the island, visitors who called on prostitutes shuddered at its mention; that same year, Sakura and Rita Chao's “New Peach-blossom River” was popular in the streets of Singapore...

There lived 3 families in 3 houses along a horizontal street (which bustled with noise and excitement) in North Bridge Road, amongst whom were 6 youths of about the same age and had grown up together. Lin Xiaobei was the only son of tailor Lin. He fought and got into trouble all the time, and was a constant headache to his neighbours. Yao Jianhong, who grew up with Xiaobei, was the only person who could subdue him. Jianhong withdrew from school at a young age and with her father, performed martial arts in the streets to sell medicated ointment. She was in the ‘turf’ for years, and was a candid and forthright girl with a sense of chivalry. Lin Xiaobei liked her and the feeling was mutual. However she was very unhappy with Xiao Bei's frivolous attitude. She hoped that Xiao Bei would be down-to-earth and succeed his father's trade. Xiaobei did not want to be resigned to cooping in the humble tailor-shop. He wanted to venture into more ambitious grounds and strike it rich someday.

Another childhood friend of Lin Xiaobei was Huang Zhihao, nicknamed "Tarzan", who was always building castles in the air. A fickle-minded youth, he wanted to be a car racer for a moment and fantasized about being a wrestler next. Both of them were at loggerheads sometimes and allies during other occasions. Xiaobei and Tarzan stick by each other through weal and woe. Like chopsticks, each is incomplete without the other.

Besides Jianhong, Tarzan's sister, Huang Jinhao, also liked Xiaobei. She was a vain and materialistic girl with a naive mindset. Despite not winning Xiaobei's heart, she was loyal to him as a friend. Jianhong's twin brother, Yao Wuji was very timid. He could only keep the feelings he had towards Jinhao to himself.

Qin Hui Min was the only one among the few youngsters who was highly educated. Though she was physically weak, she had an unrelenting perseverance, and eventually became a lawyer.

The two generations of these families went through 30 years of changes, entwined in love, hate, grudge, jealousy, magnanimity and forgiveness.

== Cast ==
- Wang Yuqing as Yao Shi 姚狮, Yao Jianhong and Yao Wuji's father
- Jeanette Aw as Yao Jianhong 姚剑虹, a martial arts perfomer turned dance hostess
- Zhang Zhenxuan as Yao Wuji 姚无忌, Yao Jianhong's twin brother and a former bookstall owner
- Li Wenhai as Lin Yi 林益, Lin Xiaobei's father and a tailor

=== Lin Family ===
Cast	Role	Description
Lin Liyun	Ah Wei	Seamstress; Lin Xiaobei's mother
Dai Xiangyu	Lin Xiaobei 林小杯	Nicknamed Lin Xiaomei (小妹, "Little Sister"); Son of Lin Yi; Event Organiser / Manager; Crush on Yao Jianhong; Huang Zhihao's best friend Yixin and Xiaoting’s father Yao Jianhong's husband (few years later)
Jarrell Huang (Teenage version portrayed by Hong Weixiang 洪玮祥)	Lin Yixin 林一心	Grandson of Lin Yi and Ah Wei; Grandson of Yao Shi; Adoptive Grandson of Huang Lifa and He Jiao; Son of Lin Xiaobei and Yao Jianhong; Adoptive son of Huang Zhihao Lin Xiaoting’s older brother Becomes a member of the Special Forces
Wu Jiamin 吴家敏	Lin Xiaoting 林小婷	Granddaughter of Lin Yi and Ah Wei; Granddaughter of Yao Shi; Daughter of Lin Xiaobei and Yao Jianhong; Lin Yixin’s younger sister

=== Huang Family ===
Cast	Role	Description
Ye Shipin	Huang Lifa 黄利发	Huang Zhihao and Huang Jinhao's father Boss of a coffee shop He Jiao's husband
Hong Huifang	He Jiao 何娇	Huang Zhihao and Huang Jinhao's mother Huang Lifa's wife
Elvin Ng	Huang Zhihao 黄志豪	Tarzan; Self-proclaimed Tiger King; Huang Jinhao's older brother Son of Huang Lifa & He Jiao; Lin Xiaobei's best friend Yixin's adoptive father Crush on Yao Jianhong & Jinzhu; Turned eunuch by wrestling opponent, Shan Lang; Jinzhu's husband (few years later)
Eelyn Kok	Huang Jinhao 黄金好	Huang Zhihao's younger sister Daughter of Huang Lifa & He Jiao; Crush on Lin Xiaobei
Jarrell Huang	Lin Yixin 林一心	Adoptive grandson of Huang Lifa and He Jiao; Son of Lin Xiaobei and Yao Jianhong Becomes a member of the Special Forces

=== Qin Family ===
Cast	Role	Description
Zheng Geping	Qin Xiangling 秦相林	Formerly a conman Liu Maomao's husband Qin Huimin's father
Aileen Tan	Liu Maomao 刘毛毛	Ex-member of Butterfly Gang; Qin Xiangling's wife Qin Huimin's mother
Zhou Ying	Qin Huimin 秦慧敏	Crush on Lin Xiaobei; Daughter of Qin Xiangling & Liu Maomao; Becomes a lawyer

=== Wang Family ===
Cast	Role	Description
Pamelyn Chee	Wang Yanxia	Wang family's second shareholder Wuji's wife (later divorced)
Jian Man	Master Wang	Wang family's business boss Yanxia's father

=== Dance Club ===
Cast	Role	Description
Constance Song	Lucy	Head Hostess of Dance Club; Lucy-jie
Yuan Long	Zhang/Yang	Lucy's assistant

=== North Bridge Road shops ===
Cast	Role	Description
You Lei	Auntie Wanton	Wanton seller
Wu Kegou	Uncle Foot	Shoe seller and Cobbler
Chen Huoming	$5.60	Wanton's assistant
Jake Low	Zhen	Paper seller Ex-member of Anti-Corruption Bureau
Fa Si	Yao Wen	Fortune teller

=== Police Station ===
Cast	Role	Description
Yuan Shuai	Ou Yuming	Inspector Ou; Was Tua Kow Yang & Dehua's Superior at first but later on transferred to Anti-Corruption Bureau; Crush on Yao Jianhong
Desmond Tan	Lin Dehua 林德华	Main Villain Corporal Lin; Yao Jianhong's cousin Crush on Yao Jianhong; Killed his superior Tua Kow Yang, Lucy, and Black Mole; Turned into a wanted man allegedly taking bribes and committing murder Deceased

=== Others ===
Cast	Role	Description
Nat Ho	Louis	Doctor; Huimin's husband
Huang Peibei	Xing Singxin	
Zhen Fuji	Mr. Poet	Poet
Benjamin Heng	Black Mole	Leader Mole gang
Zhen Ming	Joe	Zhang's rival

== Accolades ==
Organisation	Tear	Category	Nominee(s)	Result	Ref
Star Awards	2010	Best Drama Theme Song	《我们》 by Kelvin Tan	Won	
Star Awards	2010	Best Director	Chong Liung Man	Nominated	
Star Awards	2010	Best Director	Lai Lee Thin	Nominated	
Star Awards	2010	Best Director	Loo Yin Kam	Nominated	
Star Awards	2010	Best Director	Tay Peck Choo	Won	
Star Awards	2010	Best Screenplay	Ang Eng Tee	Nominated	
Star Awards	2010	Favourite Male Character	Dai Xiangyu	Nominated	
Star Awards	2010	Favourite Male Character	Elvin Ng	Nominated	
Star Awards	2010	Favourite Female Character	Jeanette Aw	Won	
Star Awards	2010	Rocket Award	Elvin Ng	Won	
Star Awards	2010	Best Actor	Elvin Ng	Nominated	
Star Awards	2010	Best Actor	Dai Xiangyu	Nominated	
Star Awards	2010	Best Actress	Jeanette Aw	Nominated	
Star Awards	2010	Best Actress	Eelyn Kok	Nominated	
Star Awards	2010	Best Supporting Actor	Zheng Geping	Nominated	
Star Awards	2010	Best Supporting Actor	Zhang Zhenxuan	Nominated	
Star Awards	2010	Best Supporting Actress	Hong Huifang	Nominated	
Star Awards	2010	Best Supporting Actress	Aileen Tan	Nominated	
Star Awards	2010	Best Drama Serial	—N/a	Won	
Asian Television Awards	2010	Best Actress	Jeanette Aw	Nominated	
Asian Television Awards	2010	Best Supporting Actor	Zhang Zhenxuan	Nominated	
Asian Television Awards	2010	Best Supporting Actress	Constance Song	Nominated	

== Trivia ==
- Fiona Xie was originally cast as Huang Jinhao, however the role was instead given to Eelyn Kok after Xie pulled out last minute for personal reasons.
- Majority of the scenes were filmed in Malacca, Malaysia.
- Scripts of Jeanette Aw was originally written to love Elvin Ng instead of Dai Xiangyu.
- Yuan Long has two names, Zhang and Yang, with the latter called more.
- The series was initially planned to have 35 episodes, but later extended to 36 due to filming overrun.
- The series was featured as material for television broadcasting for other drama series such as in episodes 4 and 7 of C.L.I.F. 2 and in episode 10 of 118.
- Child actor Jarrell Huang's first acting role and second televised role after winning the singing competition in the first season of The Sheng Siong Show in 2007. Huang would later rise to prominence on winning SPOP Sing! in 2018.

== Overseas release ==
The series was broadcast on PPCTV Channel 9 as a blockbuster drama series of the year.

Country of Broadcast	Broadcasting Network	Release date
Cambodia	PPCTV Drama 9	2 June 2010
Thailand	Thai Public Broadcasting Service	1 June 2012

== See also ==
- List of Together episodes
