= Vanessa Fernandez =

Singaporean singer

- Also known as: Miss Vandetta
- Born: Vanessa Mary Fernandez; October 17, 1982 (age 44); Singapore
- Genres: R&B, soul, jazz, pop, hip hop
- Occupations: Singer, songwriter, radio DJ, actress
- Years active: 1998–present
- Website: www.vandettamusic.net

Vanessa Mary Fernandez (born 17 October 1982) is a singer and radio presenter from Singapore. She released several albums with the now defunct hip hop groups, Urban Xchange and Parking Lot Pimp and is now more popularly known by her moniker, Vandetta, (sometimes Miss Vandetta) on Mediacorp Radio’s 987fm.

== Music career ==
Fernandez started singing in the church choir at the age of 12 and at 16, while studying at CHIJ St. Joseph’s Convent, scored a leading role in her secondary school musical directed by Wendy Ng, then the Artistic Director of the Singapore Repertory Theatre Young Company. Ng asked her to join the established theatre group and she went on to perform in several musicals including Re:Mix, penned by Singapore Idol judge and music veteran, Dick Lee, as well as 24 Hours, penned by Haresh Sharma for The Necessary Stage in 1998.

In 2000, Fernandez was asked by rapper and producer, Terry Lee, to join a group that later became known as Urban Xchange. Lee had initiated the group in order to audition for a Coca-Cola commercial. The group also comprised Munir Alsagoff, Trisno Ishak, Firdaus Bahri, Michaela Therese, Humaa and Kimberly Olsen. Urban Xchange fronted Coca-Cola’s “Life Tastes Good” campaign and released two albums after being signed to Universal Music Singapore/Malaysia. Following the high profile campaign the group received limited success in the region, contributing “When I Grow Up I Wanna Be Like Jackie Chan” to the Asian edition of the Rush Hour 2 soundtrack, featured on a remix of Brian McKnight’s “When You Wanna Come” on the Asian repack of Superhero, and performing alongside American pop singer, Stacie Orrico as well as Malaysian rap group, Too Phat, at the 2003 MTV Asia Music Awards.

In 2004, Urban Xchange regrouped as Parking Lot Pimp and signed with EMI Music Southeast Asia who released their album, Welcome To Our Frequency. After a year, Fernandez, along with Munir Alsagoff and Trisno Ishak, left Parking Lot Pimp.

At the end of 2010, Fernandez became part of audio-visual collective, Syndicate, performing with veteran hip-hop producer/DJ, Kiat, at the opening day of the infamous Gilles Peterson Worldwide Festival 2011 in Sete, France. In September that same year, she performed with veteran producer Jason Tan at the Singapore leg of the Worldwide Festival. The duo, known as Octover [sic], released their album on the Syndicate imprint in January 2013.

In 2014, Fernandez released the album Use Me on the Groove Note record label that has also released albums of another Singapore singer, Jacintha Abisheganaden. Recorded in Los Angeles at the famous Ocean Way recording studio, Use Me consists of covers of songs by Curtis Mayfield, Bill Withers and Al Green, among others. Fernandez also performed at the Singapore leg of the St Jerome's Laneway Festival, alongside James Blake, Syndicate's Gema and The Observatory.

In 2015, Fernandez plans to release a new EP under her Vandetta moniker.

== Radio career ==
In 2005, Fernandez completed her diploma in Mass Communication and was scouted by Mediacorp Radio’s 987fm to become a producer/presenter. Over 4 years, Fernandez hosted several shows including 987Stripped, and co-hosted the morning drive time show with former 987fm deejays, Daniel Ong, Mister Young and later, Divian Nair. In 2010, she left Mediacorp Radio’s 987fm to return to pursuing music full-time.

In 2010, Fernandez joined online radio station sonar.sg.

In August 2013, Fernandez returned to radio as Assistant Programme Director of Lush 99.5FM till it ceased operations on 1 September 2017. According to an official statement from Mediacorp she later joined another English radio station named 938Now but left again.

== Discography ==
=== Albums ===
==== Solo ====
- Use Me (Groove Note, 2014)
- When The Levee Breaks (Groove Note, 2016)
- I Want You (Groove Note, 2019)
- Remember Me (Groove Note, 2023)

==== with Parking Lot Pimp ====
- Welcome To Our Frequency (EMI Music, 2005)

==== with Urban Xchange ====
- Urban Xchange (Universal Music, 2002)
- How Did We Get Here? (Universal Music, 2001)

=== EPs ===
==== Solo ====
- Vandetta (Syndicate, 2013)

==== with Octover ====
- Octover (Syndicate, 2013)

==== with CCCrush ====
- Feel the Groove (ChynaHouse Recordings, 2003)
