= Regina Song =

Singaporean singer-songwriter (born 2004)

- Born: Regina Song Hwee Nee; 16 February 2004 (age 22); Singapore
- Origin: Singapore
- Genres: Pop; R&B
- Occupations: Singer; songwriter
- Instruments: Vocals; piano; guitar
- Years active: 2021–present
- Labels: PARKA; PKMC Records; No Saints Allowed; Play by NANA

Regina Song Hwee Nee (born 16 February 2004) is a Singaporean singer-songwriter who made her debut in 2021.

After the release of her debut album fangirl, Song had over 2.3 million monthly listeners on Spotify, with "the cutest pair" topping the Recording Industry Association Singapore (RIAS) charts.

== Early life and education ==
In 2004, Regina Song Hwee Nee was born in Singapore. Following her parents' musical background, she began learning piano at the age of six.

In 2017, Song enrolled in the School of the Arts, Singapore. In 2020, upon turning 16, she took a gap year from school, began songwriting and worked part-time to raise funds for her song production fees, which each cost around S$800 to S$1,200. She graduated in 2022, majoring in classical piano.

Song is part of the inaugural intake at the University of the Arts Singapore, where she is studying for a Bachelor of Arts in music as of 2024.

== Career ==
On 10 September 2021, Song made her music debut with the release of her single titled "LUCAS".

In 2023, Song signed with PARKA, and released singles from March 2023 to June 2024.

On 3 March 2024, Song was the opening act for the Singapore leg of the Grentperez growing up? tour.

On 14 June 2024, she released her debut album titled fangirl, and she was invited to perform in the live music segment of the 2024 Singapore Night Festival. As part of the I Play SG Music campaign, some songs from the album were broadcast daily in Mass Rapid Transit stations operated by SMRT Trains and in Marina Bay Sands. To date, the album has received more than 60 million streams on Spotify.

In 2025, Song was the only Singaporean nominee at the 2025 Music Awards Japan.

== Tours ==
- fangirl: The Tour (2025)

== Personal life ==
Song grew up in a Catholic household.

== Discography ==
=== fangirl (2024) ===
The album was released on 14 June 2024. "the cutest pair" peaked at number 2 and number 9 on the RIAS Top Regional and Top Streaming charts respectively.

All lyrics are written by Regina Song.

No.	Title	Producer(s)	Length
1.	"high school boy"	Dominic Yuan	2:54
2.	"the cutest pair"	Leo Matias; Dominic Yuan; Timothy Liew	2:38
3.	"venus"	Dominic Yuan	4:10
4.	"brozone"	Gaius Gurvinder; Leo Matias	3:42
5.	"love... at first sight?"	Dominic Yuan; Leo Matias	4:01
6.	"discord"	Dominic Yuan	2:29
7.	"heartache frenzy"	Dominic Yuan	3:40
8.	"leftover feelings"	Dominic Yuan; Cialeo Matias	5:23
9.	"clueless"	Dominic Yuan; Leo Matias	3:49
10.	"fangirl"	Dominic Yuan	5:15
Total length:			38:05

=== everland (2026) ===
The album was released on 26 June 2026.

All lyrics are written by Regina Song.

No.	Title	Producer(s)	Length
1.	"Opening Line"	Ian Lee; Alicia DC	2:50
2.	"Your Charm"	Ian Lee; Alicia DC; Low Tse Han; isaacprease	2:48
3.	"Dreamer's Song"	Ian Lee; Alicia DC	3:01
4.	"Kisses by the shore"	LANG; Ian Lee; Alicia DC; JJ Lee	3:32
5.	"CGI"	Ian Lee; Alicia DC; Low Tse Han; isaacprease	2:49
6.	"I love you more"	Ian Lee; Alicia DC	3:13
7.	"Mourning Rain"	Ian Lee; Alicia DC	3:01
8.	"But what do you think?"	Ian Lee; Alicia DC	3:08
9.	"Mars"	Ian Lee; Alicia DC	2:44
10.	"History"	Ian Lee; Alicia DC; Low Tse Han; isaacprease	2:40
11.	"The Sweetest Chapter"	Ian Lee; Alicia DC	4:22
Total length:			34:12

== Awards and nominations ==
Year	Award	Category	Nominated work	Result	Notes
2024	Official Singapore Chart	Top Local Song by a female artist	"the cutest pair" from fangirl	Won	
2025	2025 Music Awards Japan	Best Song Asia	"the cutest pair" from fangirl	Nominated	
