= Sherman Zhuo =

Singaporean singer-songwriter

- Born: Sherman Toh Zhen Sheng; 16 November 1995 (age 31); Singapore
- Other name: Sherman Zhuo
- Education: Singapore Institute of Management
- Occupation: Singer-songwriter
- Musical career
- Origin: Singapore
- Genres: Mandopop; Ballad; R&B
- Instruments: Vocals; guitar
- Years active: 2023–present
- Labels: Cross Ratio Entertainment; Warner Music Singapore; Artist Co

Chinese name
- Traditional Chinese: 卓振聲
- Simplified Chinese: 卓振声
- Hanyu Pinyin: Zhuó Zhèn Shēng
- Jyutping: Zoek3 Zan3sing1

Sherman Toh Zhen Sheng (Chinese: 卓振声, known professionally as Sherman Zhuo, born 16 November 1995) is a Singaporean singer-songwriter. He is the semi-finalist of SPOP Sing! 2018.

== Early life ==
Sherman was born on 16 November 1995, in Singapore. He graduated from the Republic Polytechnic with a diploma in mass communications. He is also a graduate of Singapore Institute of Management.

== Career ==
=== Debut and rise in fame ===
In his early years, Sherman competed in numerous singing competitions, such as competing as a finalist in Noise Singapore's Encore in 2015.

Sherman first started his career after he finished as a semi-finalist in the first season of Mediacorp's SPOP Sing! in 2018. He then participated in Starker Music Jams 2019, which he won. Sherman released his first single titled "In Future" on 8 December 2019. Sherman worked together with renowned R&B producer Gen Neo for the release of his single "Unused To", which he participated in writing the lyrics and music for the first time. In 2021, Sherman released the singles "part of your world" and collaborated with Doninic Chin for the single "better (reimagined)".

Sherman performed in the opening act at the prestigious One Love Asia Festival 2022, which includes renowned artists such as F.I.R., Show Lo, Stefanie Sun, Tanya Chua, Yoga Lin and more. Sherman has also performed in concerts and stages like IMC Live's AL!VE Concert Series and December Rains 雨季 Concert in 2022.

Sherman rose to prominence after his single "hard to let you go" topped viral charts since its released. He released "but hey", "cos idk how" with Soph T. and "The Best Mistake" in 2023. Sherman received the Spotify Wrapped 2023's "Best Local Song" award. He released "Awesome", "endless shine", "坠在原点的我" and "爱情的名字" in 2024. "endless shine" was released in a collaboration with Geneco's campaign to promote mental health awareness among the youths.

He also won Spotify Wrapped 2024's "Top Local Artist" of "Hot Hits Singapore 2024".

== Discography ==
=== Singles ===
Title	Year	Album
"In Future" 以後	2019	Non-album singles
"Unused To" (不习惯)	2020	Non-album singles
"part of your world" (一切，是你)	2021	Non-album singles
"better (reimagined)" (with Dominic Chin)	2021	Re:Licensed To Cry
"What You Tryna Do" (featuring Acid)	2022	The Blockbusters OST part 3
"hard to let you go"	2023	Once Upon A New Year's Eve OST part 3
"but hey"	2023	Non-album singles
"cos idk how" (with Soph T.)	2023	Non-album singles
"The Best Mistake" (最對的錯)	2023	Non-album singles
"Awesome"	2024	Non-album singles
"endless shine"	2024	Non-album singles
坠在原点的我	2024	Non-album singles
爱情的名字	2024	Non-album singles
"Unspoken Words" (有話沒說) (with Kaia Lee)	2025	Non-album singles

=== As featured artist ===
Title	Year	Album
墨菲定律 (Shelby Wang featuring Sherman Zhuo)	2024	BLUE-HOO
他從我的指尖溜走 (Lauren Woo featuring Sherman Zhuo)	2024	Non-album single

== Filmography ==
=== Television shows ===
Year	Title	Network	Role	Notes	Ref.
2018	SPOP Sing!	Mediacorp Channel 8	Contestant	Semi-finalist	
