= Serene Koong =

Singaporean singer

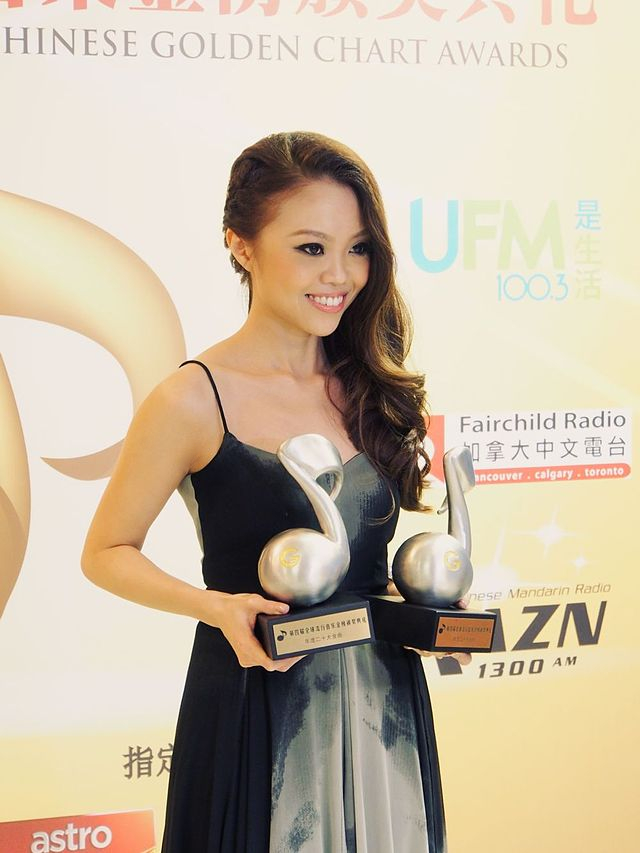
- Koong in 2014

Background information
- Also known as: Gong Zhiyi
- Born: 21 September 1988 (age 38)
- Origin: Singapore
- Genres: Mandopop; R&B
- Occupations: Singer; songwriter; producer
- Instruments: Vocals; piano; guitar
- Years active: 2010–present
- Label: GoodGirlMusic
- Website: serenekoong.com

Chinese name
- Traditional Chinese: 龔芝怡
- Simplified Chinese: 龚芝怡
- Hanyu Pinyin: Gōng Zhīyí

Serene Koong (born 21 September 1988) is a Singaporean singer, songwriter and producer. She is a three time Global Chinese Golden Chart Award, three time Singapore Hit Awards, Star Awards winner, and Asian Academy Creative Awards National Winner.

== Career ==
=== 2010-2013 ===
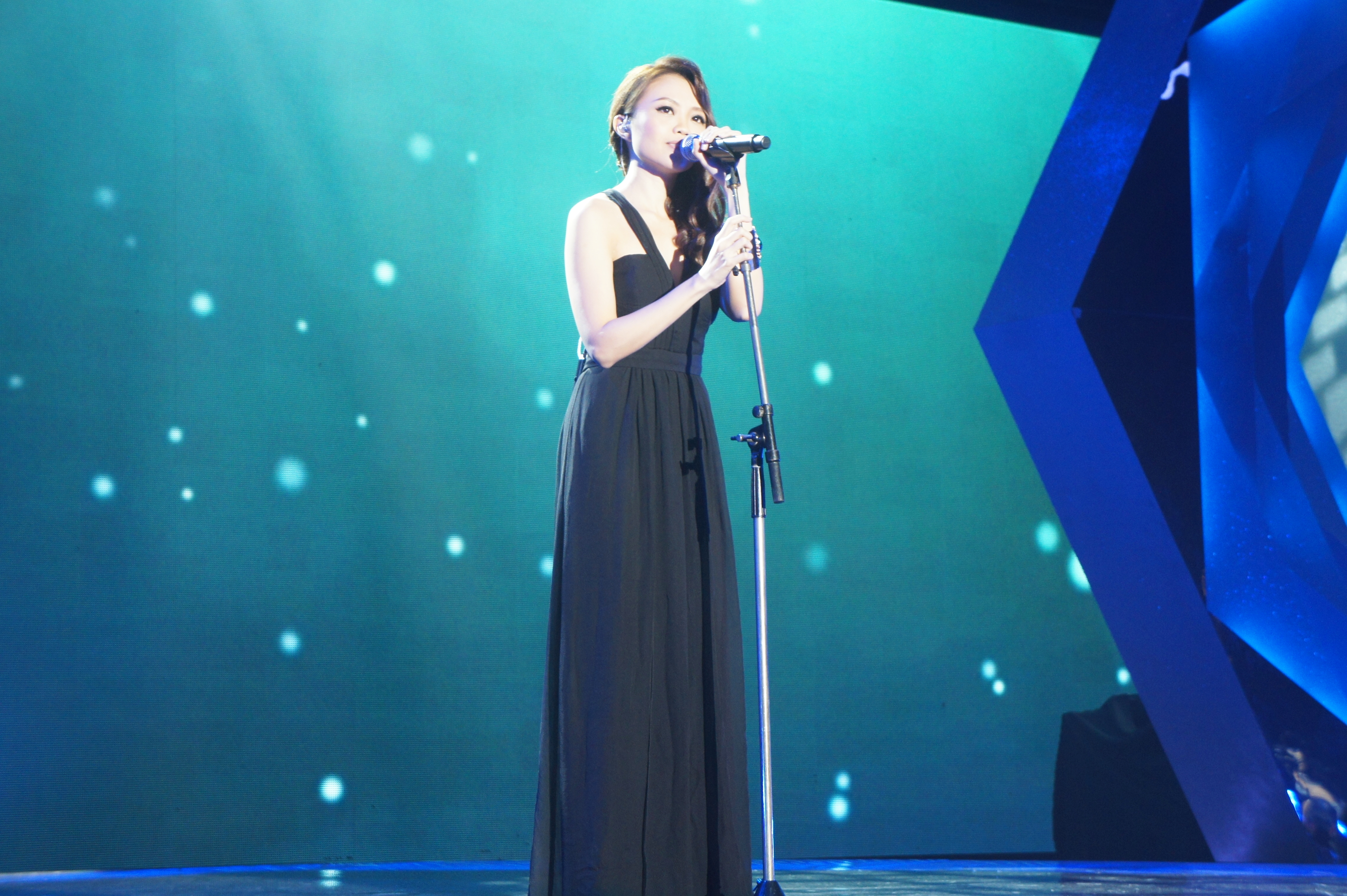
Koong performing her hit song "Happiness isn’t Hard" (Theme song for The Dream Makers ) during the Singapore Hit Awards.

In May 2010, Koong released her debut Mandarin album, 55:38:7, composed of ten original compositions. Her single "明知我愛你" peaked at number 3 on YES 933 醉心龙虎榜. The single was nominated for Best Local Composition at the 2010 Singapore Hit Awards; Koong received four nominations total and won the Most Popular Newcomer award and the Meritorious Newcomer award.

Koong was also involved in song production for television series and films with "在我左右" for Mediacorp Channel 8's television series New Beginnings and "手中线" for the film Love Cuts starring Zoe Tay and Kenny Ho. Same year, Koong had filmed two advertisements with Fraser and Neave, one of which featured her original song "Lala" performed with Jiahui Wu.

In March 2012, Koong made her debut in Taiwan with the album 聲.體.輿言, distributed by Warner Music Taiwan. In the same year, she performed at the Esplanade's Huayi Chinese Festival of Arts.

In 2013, Koong formed her music company, GoodGirlMusic, to manage her career. She produced, wrote, and performed the theme song "Happiness Isn’t Hard" (幸福不难) for Mediacorp Channel 8's television series The Dream Makers. Her song was selected from 55 musicians who submitted their work to Mediacorp. That year, Koong was named "Top Downloaded Female Artist" by MeRadio at the 18th Singapore Hit Awards for the song "Happiness isn’t Hard".

=== 2014-2017 ===
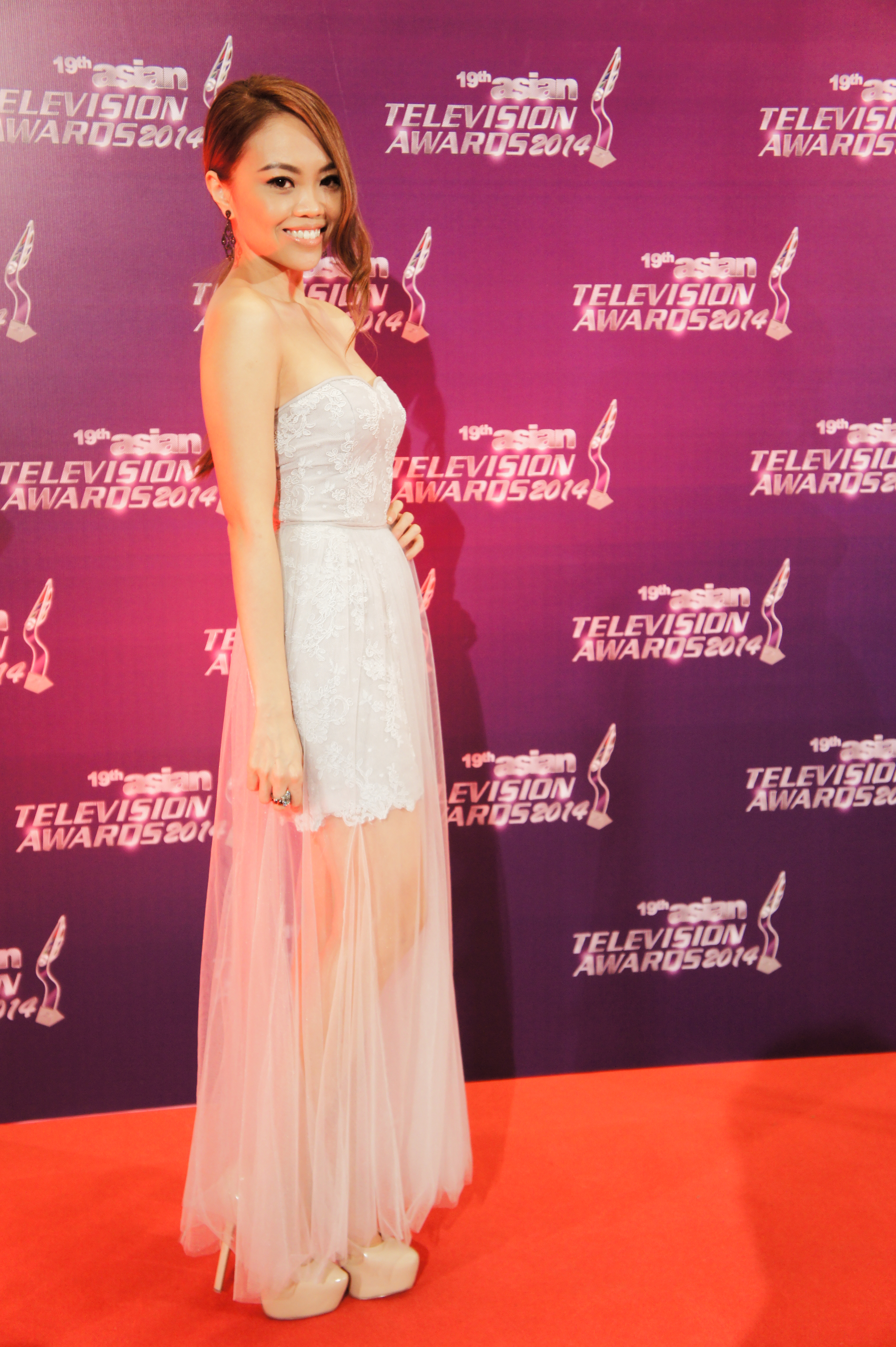
Koong at 2014 Asian Television Award where her work "Happiness isn’t Hard", which she wrote, produced and performed for the drama series The Dream Makers, was nominated for the Best Theme Song Award.

In 2014, Koong won the Best Theme Song at the Star Awards for "Happiness Isn't Hard." The song was also named the Top Dedicated Hit Song by UFM1003 and reached number one on the Singapore iTunes Mandopop chart. Koong received two Global Chinese Golden Chart Awards including "Outstanding Artiste Award" (Singapore, UFM1003) for the song and a nomination for Best Theme Song at the 19th Asian Television Awards. Koong was the Mandarin lead singer for the theme song, "网织同心" (Knit with One Heart), of the Singapore Chingay Parade 2014, which was presented at the parade with Lee Wei Song as music director.

In July 2015, Koong wrote a song "Precious" (心肝) for Kelvin Tong's film (Grandma Positioning System) in the SG50 anthology film 7Letters. She was inspired by the eulogy of Lee Kuan Yew to his wife Kwa Geok Choo. She was the producer, vocal producer, songwriter and performer of the song, which peaked at number five on the Singapore iTunes Mandopop chart. In December, her single "All Alone" (当世界只剩下我一个人), which she wrote, produced, and performed for The Dream Makers II, peaked at number two on the Singapore iTunes Mandopop chart.

In August 2016, Koong was among the three Singaporean artists whose works charted on the Global Chinese Golden Charts TOP 20 (first half of 2016). On 7 May 2017, Koong received the Outstanding Artist of The Year presented by UFM100.3 award at the Global Chinese Golden Chart Awards.

=== 2018-Present ===
On 9 August 2018, Koong appeared on the prelude episode of SPOP Sing!, a singing competition the search for the next homegrown talent. She also served the series as a vocal and performance Mentor to the Top 20 contestants.

In 2021, Koong served as the Vocal and Performance Mentor on SPOP Wave!. On 30 September, Koong was announced as the National Winner for Best Theme Song / Title at the Asian Academy Creative Awards, with her work "When It Leads Me Back To You", which she wrote, performed and produced for Mediacorp Channel 5's drama series Slow Dancing.

In 2023, Koong wrote, performed and produced the ending theme song for All That Glitters which began airing on September 18.

In 2024, "TENDER", written by Koong, Lai Zhenming, and Ferry, was presented on Melody Journey by Lai. The song was chosen and performed by Shan Yichun.

== Discography ==
=== Studio albums ===
Title	Album details
55:38:7	Released: 2010; Label: Rock Records
聲 . 體 . 輿言	Released: 2012; Label: Warner Music Taiwan

=== Singles ===
Title	Year	Album
"Happiness Isn’t Hard" (幸福不难)	2013	Non-album single
"心肝"	2015	Non-album single
"当世界只剩下我一个人"	2016	Non-album single
"酸甜苦澀"	2018	Non-album single
"Save Me From Myself"	2019	Non-album single
"When It Leads Me Back To You"	2021	Non-album single
"Breathe Again"	2023	Non-album single
"直到最后 Eternally"	2023	Non-album single

=== Other songwriting credits ===
Year	Credit	Title	Artist	Album
2016	Writer	"独家献映"	BBF	王者之路
2017	Writer	"想象空间"	Janice Vidal	衛蘭
2018	Writer	"北极光"	Su Miaoling	北极光
2018	Writer	"Honeymoon" (蜂蜜月亮)	Valen Hsu	绽放的绽放的绽放
2024	Writer	"TENDER"	单依纯	音乐缘计划

== Awards and nominations ==
Year	Award ceremony	Category	Nominated work	Result	Ref
2010	Singapore Hit Awards	Most Popular Newcomer	—N/a	Won	
2010	Singapore Hit Awards	Meritorious Newcomer	—N/a	Won	
2010	Singapore Hit Awards	Best Local Composition	"明知我爱你"	Nominated	
2010	Singapore Hit Awards	Best Local Singer	—N/a	Nominated	
2011	Star Awards	Best Theme Song	"在我左右" (Theme song for New Beginnings)	Nominated	
2011	Singapore e-Awards	Best Lyrics 最佳作詞	"平行線"	Nominated	
2011	FreshMusic Awards	Best Local Singer 最佳本地歌手奖	—N/a	Won	
2013	Singapore Hit Awards	MeRadio Top Downloaded Hit Award (Female Artiste)	"Happiness isn’t Hard"	Won	
2013	Singapore Hit Awards	Best Composition 最佳本地作曲	"Happiness isn’t Hard"	Nominated	
2013	Singapore Hit Awards	Best Lyrics 最佳本地作词	"Happiness isn’t Hard"	Nominated	
2014	Global Chinese Golden Chart Awards	Top Dedicated Hit Song	"Happiness isn’t Hard"	Won	
2014	Global Chinese Golden Chart Awards	Outstanding Artist Award	—N/a	Won	
2014	Star Awards	Best Theme Song	"Happiness isn’t Hard" (Theme song for The Dream Makers)	Won	
2014	Asian Television Awards	Best Theme Song 最佳主题曲	"Happiness isn’t Hard" (Theme song for The Dream Makers)	Nominated	
2015	Global Chinese Golden Chart Awards	Outstanding Artist of The Year 年度推崇大歌手	"当世界只剩下我一个人"	Won	
2018	23rd Compass Awards	Top Local Soundtrack	"Happiness isn’t Hard" (Theme song for The Dream Makers)	Won	
2021	Asian Academy Creative Awards	Best Theme Song / Title Theme (National level)	"When It Leads Me Back To You" for Slow Dancing	Won	
