= Rhyu =

Singaporean singer-songwriter (born 2004)

rhyu
- Born: Raine Chiew Hahn Yu; 2004 (age 21–22); Singapore
- Education: School of the Arts, Singapore
- Occupation: Singer-songwriter
- Years active: 2022–current
- Musical career
- Origin: Singapore
- Genres: Pop; R&B; Jazz
- Instrument: Vocals
- Label: PK Records

Chinese name
- Traditional Chinese: 週晗雨
- Simplified Chinese: 周晗雨
Transcriptions
Standard Mandarin
- Hanyu Pinyin: Zhōu Hányǔ
- IPA: [ʈʂóʊ.xǎn.ỳn]

Raine Chiew Hahn Yu (born c. 2004), known as rhyu (stylised in all lowercase), is a Singaporean singer-songwriter who made her debut in 2022.

== Early life and education ==
In 2004, Chiew was born in Singapore. In her childhood, Chiew began writing and composing songs.

In 2017, Chiew enrolled in the School of the Arts, Singapore. In a national singing and songwriting competition organised by the Ministry of Education in 2021, Chiew won top prizes in both the open songwriting and solo singing categories.

Currently Chiew is part of the inaugural batch studying in the College of Integrative Studies at the Singapore Management University (SMU), which allows students to select from courses across all SMU colleges and customise their major. Chiew is majoring in ethical marketing through the arts.

== Career ==
On 22 April 2022, Chiew made her music debut with the release of her single titled Melt. On 17 March 2023, she released another single titled It's fine, which has since received more than 2.6 million streams on Spotify.

Since her debut Chiew has had over 85,000 monthly listeners on Spotify, and performed in various festivals islandwide.

Chiew is known for her deep and raspy voice, and it has been compared to Icelandic musician Laufey.

== Discography ==
- It's Pouring (2025)

All lyrics are written by Raine Chiew Hahn Yu.

No.	Title	Producers	Length
1.	"For it's You and Me"	Daniel Alex Chia; Ian Lee	2:33
2.	"Can't tell"	Daniel Alex Chia; Ian Lee	3:00
3.	"Precious"	Daniel Alex Chia; Ian Lee	3:01
4.	"Song No. 2"	Daniel Alex Chia; Ian Lee	4:24
5.	"Forever Person"	Daniel Alex Chia; Ian Lee	2:34
Total length:			15:32
