= Sarah Cheng-De Winne =

Sarah X. Miracle 鄭雪梅
- Born: Sarah Cheng Xue Mei; 2 December 1987 (age 38); Singapore
- Genres: R&B, Soul, pop, Jazz
- Occupations: Singer (mezzosoprano), musician, songwriter, record producer, photographer
- Instruments: Vocals, piano
- Years active: 2010–present
- Labels: Warner Music, Rouxinol Records
- Website: sarahxmiracle.com

Sarah Cheng-De Winne Xue Mei (simplified Chinese: 郑雪梅; traditional Chinese: 鄭雪梅) (born 2 December 1987), professionally known as Sarah X. Miracle, is a Singaporean soul-pop singer, songwriter, and musician.

== Career ==
In 2013, Cheng-De Winne was named Winner at the 12th Independent Music Awards for her song, "Love-Shape Void" in the Contemporary Christian/Gospel song category. She was also nominated in the R&B/Soul Song category for her song "Diagonal Rain". She had released two albums, Let's Pretend (2010) and Brand New (2012).

Cheng-De Winne is also recognized for her portrait photography work, her portfolio having been featured on numerous photography blogs. Cheng-De Winne was previously a Radio DJ at MediaCorp's 938LIVE from 2011 to 2012.

== Discography ==
- Let's Pretend (2010)
- Brand New (2012)
- Candle (2015)
- 看见 (2017)
- Don't Say It (2020)

== Awards ==
- Winner, Contemporary Christian/Gospel Song Category, 12th Independent Music Awards 2013 for "Love-Shape Void"
- Nominated, R&B/Soul Song Category, 12th Independent Music Awards 2013 for "Diagonal Rain"
