= Shine (Singapore festival) =

SHINE logo

SHINE is a nationwide festival in Singapore "by youth, for youth" and is jointly supported by the Ministry of Social and Family Development and the National Youth Council.

Inaugurated in 2005, SHINE aims to:

1. Showcase and develop youth talent and skills
2. Facilitate and profile youth community contribution
3. Project a positive youth image and profile young role models

People aged 15–35 could sign up as participants, SHINE volunteers, or realize their ideas through grants. Over 200,000 people were part of SHINE 2007's wide assortment of activities.

SHINE 2008 was scheduled be held from 28 June to 2 August.
