= Jarrell Huang =

Singaporean singer and actor (born 2000)

- Born: 14 October 2000 (age 26); Singapore
- Other name: Jarrell Ng
- Education: Maha Bodhi School; Chung Cheng High School
- Occupations: Singer; actor; songwriter
- Musical career
- Genre: Mandopop
- Instrument: Vocals

Chinese name
- Traditional Chinese: 黃俊融
- Simplified Chinese: 黄俊融
- Hanyu Pinyin: Huáng Jùnróng

Jarrell Huang Jun Rong (born 14 October 2000) is a Singaporean singer, actor and songwriter. In 2018, he was crowned champion of the local singing competition SPOP Sing!. In 2020, he participated in the Chinese male group competition show We Are Young.

== Early life ==
Huang studied at Maha Bodhi School and Chung Cheng High School.

== Career ==
In 2007, Huang first participates in the first season of Singapore's game show The Sheng Siong Show during the children singing competition segment, in which he won. He then made his first child acting role in the 2009's drama Together.

In 2011, Huang finished ninth place on the eighth season of the Taiwanese reality talent show Chinese Million Star. He was the youngest contestant to become a Top 10 finalist. In 2014, he released his debut Mandarin EP, "Little Prince's Adventure". In 2017, he took part in the second edition of Chinese competition show Sound of My Dream.

In 2018, he took part and won in the first season of the Singaporean Chinese-language singing reality competition SPOP Sing!, organised by Mediacorp. In February 2020, Huang and local singer JJ Neo, co-wrote and sing a song titled The Light, a rally song launched by Mediacorp for COVID-19 pandemic.

In June 2020, he participated in the Chinese male group competition show We Are Young. He was voted out in the semi-final week and finished in 22nd place.

== Filmography ==
=== Television series ===
| Year | Title | Role | Notes |
|---|---|---|---|
| 2019 | A World of Difference (都市狂想) | Weibo | |
| 2021 | Live Your Dreams (大大的梦想) | Ah Ruo | |
| 2022 | Dark Angel (黑天使) | Zikang | |
| 2022 | In Safe Hands (守护星) | Wu Guangming | |

== Discography ==
=== Drama soundtrack ===
| Year | Song title | Drama title | Notes |
|---|---|---|---|
| 2019 | "Jiu Shi Ni Jiu Shi Ni" | My One in a Million | |
| 2023 | "Scar" | My One and Only | |

== Awards and nominations ==
| Year | Ceremony | Category | Nominated work | Result |
|---|---|---|---|---|
| 2021 | Star Awards | Best Theme Song | My One in a Million "就是你就是你" | Nominated |
| 2023 | Star Awards | Best Rising Star | In Safe Hands (as Wu Guangming) | Nominated |
| 2023 | Star Awards | Top 3 Most Popular Rising Stars | —N/a | Nominated |
