= Trisno =

- Birth name: Trisno Ishak
- Born: 18 July 1978 (age 47)
- Genres: Jazz, R&B, blues
- Occupation(s): Singer-songwriter, teacher
- Years active: 2000 – present

Trisno Ishak (18 July 1978), known professionally as Trisno, is a singer and teacher from Singapore. In 2000, he was the lead singer of Urban Xchange, which evolved to Parking Lot Pimp. He has performed alongside Stacie Orrico, Jamie Cullum, Jay Sean, Missy Higgins and Ben and Joey of The Click Five. He collaborated with John Lennon, Brian McKnight, Mr. Cheeks from The Lost Boyz, Malaysian hip-hop duo Too Phat, Malaysian singer Camelia, Singaporean rapper Sheikh Haikel, and Taiwanese pop singer Evonne. With his sizzling buttery voice, Trisno has captivated local and international audience. Coupled along with his versatility in music and adept talent at working the crowd, he is described as "the guy who was born to be a performer".

== Early years ==
Trisno was born into a musically inclined background. His mother, Dahlia Ahmad, was a recording artist at EMI. Dahlia's sister and brother, Hamidah Ahmad and Eddie Ahmad, were also recording artists and recorded a duet titled Mawarku (translated in English as My Rose), which was a major hit in the 1970s. This song has been popularised by Siti Nurhaliza and group 2 by 2 from Malaysia. Early on in his life, Trisno was exposed to the musical world. His mother brought him to her jazz performances across the region when his father, Ishak Ahmad, was often overseas. Backstage, Trisno would never fail to catch a glimpse of his mother singing and performing in front of the masses. From then on, his musical journey began. Growing up, Trisno listened to music from genres ranging from jazz to Motown to Latin. His early influences include Spyro Gyra (jazz), Shakatak (jazz-funk), Frank Sinatra (vocal jazz) and Julio Iglesias (Latin). Mostly disguised as a toilet singer, his talent was only first spotted at the age of 14. His stepfather, Redwan Ali, exposed him to musicians such as David Sanborn, Miles Davis, Chick Corea and Herbie Hancock. Trisno learnt the importance of music from educational perspective such as music notation, song composition and studio works. Trisno continued learning music and has become adept at piano, acoustic guitar, bass guitar and electric guitar. He obtained 8th grade in bass guitar at Yamaha Music School.

== Music career ==
=== Urban Xchange ===
As Trisno served his national service, he met music producer Terry Lee. Under the direction of Lee, Trisno appeared on "Serenade Volume 3" in the song "My Lady, My Bonnie, My Wifey" in an album compilation of Asian-American musicians that was released in the United States. With Lee and five others, including Vanessa Fernandez and Munir Alsagoff, they formed Urban Xchange in 2000. The group was signed to Universal Music Group after a Coca-Cola endorsement deal for the "Life Tastes Good" campaign set for Asia. The debut album was released in 2001 titled How Did We Get Here?, which includes songs such as "Stupid", which was on high rotation on local radio and MTV. The second album, self-titled, was released in 2002 with the single "Buzzin".

In 2001, MTV named Urban Xchange artist of the month, and they appeared on the Rush Hour 2 soundtrack with the song "I wanna be like Jackie Chan". Two years later, in 2003, Urban Xchange won tBest Regional English Album at the AIM awards in Malaysia, and were nominated for Best/Favourite Singapore Artiste in MTV Asia Awards 2003. The group performed alongside Europe's classical pop quintet Wild, British R&B popstar Jay Sean, Australian folk singer Missy Higgins, and American singer Richard Marx in EMI Rainbow of Sound Showcase 2004 in Bangkok.

Urban Xchange also appeared in Elle Singapore January 2002 edition as 'Hot Musicians' to look out for in 2002. Urban Xchange's achievement and fame in local and regional scene was rooted in "its fusion of sounds" Pivotal to their success was Hans Ebert, who was vice-president of Universal Music Asia Pacific and then joining EMI. Recorded Music Southeast Asia as advisor to chairman in September 2002. When Urban Xchange was reborn as Parking Lot Pimp, Ebert maintained close affiliation and support for the new band.

=== Parking Lot Pimp ===
In 2005, Urban Xchange evolved into Parking Lot Pimp, boasting psychedelic and space rock. It was composed of four members of Urban Xchange – Trisno, Vanessa, Terry, and Munir, as well as Jeremy Green, an American rapper. The shift in music genre and band image was primarily because of boredom of Urban Xchange and hip-hop. Their album Welcome to our frequency was released in 2005. They were named MTV Advance Warning Artiste. In 2005 and 2006, Parking Lot Pimp featured on America Online Music. This album included the song "Blow"

=== Solo ===
Trisno has sung at various bars including J bar, Blue Bar Bistro and Indochine, and performs at the annual MOSAIC music festival.

In the first Singapore edition of Don't Forget the Lyrics! held by MediaCorp in 2008, Trisno was the guide vocalist. In 2009, he performed alongside fusion band Novo Bloco. for the Gilles Peterson's Worldwide Festival held in Zirca (Singapore).

=== The Trisno Trio ===
In 2011, Trisno led the formation of The Trisno Trio, an eclectic acoustic group, with Clifford Gomez (a.k.a. "Cliffy") and Abdul Rahman (a.k.a. "Joey").

==== Sennheiser Asia's Sound Heroes ====
In August 2012, Sennheiser Electronic Asia ("Sennheiser Asia") launched its regional marketing campaign entitled "The Pursuit of Perfect Sound", to mark its twentieth anniversary of direct presence in the region.

Shortly after, in September 2012, The Trisno Trio were named as one of Sennheiser Asia's Sound Heroes. On 16 November 2012, The Trisno Trio were showcased as one of eleven Sennheiser Asia Sound Heroes in Sennheiser Asia's twentieth anniversary celebrations held at Zouk Singapore.

==== Egypt ====
In March 2013, Trisno Trio launched their debut album entitled "Egypt". Songs from Egypt have made various headlines locally and overseas. For example, Trisno was invited on Mediacorp Suria's beauty-cum-talent competition, Ratu, as a guest artiste to showcase Trisno Trio's song, Ratu.

Since launch of Egypt, Trisno Trio have performed at various events such as Singapore's Mosaic Music Festival, Sonic Spree Music Festival and ONE (Singapore)'s second annual gala "ONE BALL 2013".

In October 2013, Trisno Trio performed and was nominated for two awards – "Best Collaboration" & "Best Duo / Group" – at 2013 Anugerak Planet Muzik 2013.

== Teaching career ==
Trisno continues to share his passion for music with youths in schools and institutions through teaching. His students are taught from a variety of music specialisation subjects such as music production, strum & sing guitar classes, rap mission, vocal classes and world-music/hip hop acid production. Some of the schools that he has taught in are Saint Gabriel's Secondary School, Pierce Secondary School and Canberra Secondary School.

== Collaborations (group and solo) ==
- 2001
  - (US) With rapper from US, Mr. Cheeks of The Lost Boyz, on Urban Xchange's first album, track titled Cheeky
- 2002
  - (MALAYSIA) With award-winning hip hop duo, Too Phat, on Urban Xchange's self-titled album, track titled That Booty Song
  - (MALAYSIA) With Ruffedge & V.E. on Urban Xchange's self-titled album, track titled Sabarlah
  - (SINGAPORE) With Sheik Haikel on his album For Sure, song titled Jangan tinggal daku
  - (TAIWAN) [on keyboard] With Taiwanese popstar Evonne Hsu, on her album EVONNE, song titled Buzzin
  - (US) With Grammy award nominee Brian McKnight, on his bonus album Superhero, song titled When you wanna come
- 2003
  - (MALAYSIA) With Malaysia's Camelia on her album, song titled "Not That Type of Lady"
  - (TAIWAN) With Taiwanese pop band Energy, track titled Ramen Song
- 2005
  - (UK/US) With John Lennon and various artistes for his album Lennon & Yoko presents Peace, Love & Truth song titled Give Peace a Chance

== Performances (group and solo) ==
- 2001
  - National Day Parade
- 2002
  - Day Out at Esplanade, Grand Opening of Esplanade
  - MerdekaTONE at Bintang Walk, Malaysia's National Day
  - Opening act of the showcase for American R&B artist, Christina Milian at LOX, Clarke Quay
- 2003
  - ASIAN X GAMES V held at Petronas Twin Towers
  - AXN Asian Challenge at Petronas Twin Towers
  - Grand Opening of ADIDAS ORIGINALS store at Pacific Plaza
  - Grand Opening of Tower Records KL, 1 UTAMA
  - National Day Parade
  - Urban Xchange SOUL'D OUT concert, Late Nite at Esplanade Recital Studios
- 2004
  - A Jam Session Duet with Jamie Cullum at Indochine Aquadisiac Wisma
  - EMI Rainbow of Sound Showcase in Bangkok, performed alongside Europe's classical pop quintet Wild, UK r&b popstar Jay Sean, Australian folk singer Missy Higgins and America's celebrated legend Richard Marx
  - MTV Asia Awards, performed with Stacie Orrico
- 2005
  - MOSAIC music festival 2005 at Esplanade, Parking Lot Pimp
- 2006
  - A Jam Session with Ben and Joey of The Click Five at J Bar, M Hotel Singapore
  - MOSAIC music festival 2006 at the Esplanade, opening act with Soulcadelics, for UK's acid jazz pioneer, INCOGNITO! 2006
  - SoundwaveS by People's Association @ the Esplanade Concert Theatre guest appearing alongside Dick Lee and Joi Cai Chun Jia
  - Trisno Ishak and friends Concert @ the Esplanade outdoors
- 2007
  - A Jam Session with Ben and Joey of The Click Five at J Bar, M Hotel Singapore
  - Lunchbox at the Esplanade. Relax... It's Trisno
- 2008
  - MOSAIC Festival 2008 at The Esplanade. Tribute to country legends
- 2009
  - Gilles Peterson's Worldwide Festival in Zirca (Singapore), alongside Novo Bloco

== Features (group and solo) ==
- 2000
  - Coca-Cola advertisement, Life Tastes Good Campaign ambassador
- 2001
  - Recorded featured song on Hollywood's blockbuster movie, Rush Hour 2 OST titled I wanna be like Jackie Chan
  - MTV's Artist of the month, Urban Xchange
  - Sang on an Asian American Compilation album called SERENADE vol.3, a song titled My lady, My Bonnie, My wifey
- 2003
  - AIM Awards nominee for 4 categories and winner of Best Regional English Album
  - MTV Asia Awards Nominee for Best/Favourite Singapore Artiste
- 2004
  - Featured on Maksim Mrvica's single Flight
- 2005
  - Featured on American Online Music, Parking Lot Pimp
  - MTV's Advance Warning Artiste, Parking Lot Pimp
  - Appearance as guest host on celebrity special segment on MTV Jus

== Awards and nominations ==
Year	Nominee / work	Award	Result
2003	Urban Xchange	Best Group Vocal Performance in Album	Nominated
2003	Urban Xchange	Best Recorded Album	Nominated
2003	Urban Xchange	Best New Regional English Artiste	Nominated
2003	Urban Xchange	Best Regional English Album	Won
2003	Urban Xchange	MTV Asia Awards' Best/Favourite Singapore Artiste	Nominated
2013	Trisno Trio feat Altimet	Anugerah Planet Muzik's Best Collaboration	Nominated
2013	Trisno Trio feat Altimet	Anugerah Planet Muzik's Best Duo/Group	Nominated
