= Morning Express =

Morning Express may refer to

- Morning Express (2014 TV series), a Singaporean morning television news that airs on MediaCorp Channel 8
- Morning Express (1995 TV series), a Singaporean drama television series
- Morning Express with Robin Meade, an American morning television news program that airs on the HLN television network
- Tokyo Morning Express, a Japanese business news program that aired on Nikkei CNBC
- China Morning Express, was a metropolitan daily newspaper operated by Zhejiang Daily Press Group, established on October 8, 2000.
