= Three Wishes (Singaporean TV series) =

- 三个愿望
- Genre: Drama; Family; Fantasy; Mystery
- Written by: Molby Low 刘健财; Ho Hee Ann 何启安; Wong Lee Lyn 黄丽琳; Han Yew Kwang 韩耀光
- Directed by: Chen Yi You 陈忆幼 何恕; Canter Chia 谢光华
- Starring: Thomas Ong; Huang Biren; Zhu Houren; Jin Yinji; Julie Tan; Shane Pow
- Opening theme: 稳稳的幸福 by Eason Chan
- Ending theme: 1) 我看见的世界 by Where Chou; 2) 因爱 by Estella Seah & Julie Tan
- Country of origin: Singapore
- Original languages: Mandarin, with English subtitles
- No. of episodes: 20

Production
- Producer: Molby Low 刘健财
- Running time: approx. 45 minutes
- Production company: Wawa Pictures

Original release
- Network: Mediacorp Channel 8
- Release: 27 October – 21 November 2014

Related
- Three Little Wishes

Three Wishes (Chinese: 三个愿望) is a Singaporean family mystery drama produced by production company Wawa Pictures and telecast on MediaCorp Channel 8. The drama began production in June 2014 and made its debut on 27 October that year. This serial marked the return of acclaimed veteran actress Huang Biren, who was last seen in Mars vs Venus in 2007, the fifth Wawa production featuring Thomas Ong, and Apple Hong's 2014 drama series after Joys of Life in 2012. It is also the fourth Wawa production to be aired on Channel 8 after Disclosed, and the 11th Wawa production overall.

Audience reception to the drama has been largely favourable, with the viewership breaking the 1 million mark on its debut episode, a phenomenon rarely seen in local dramas, and was the fourth series at 9 pm after Soup of Life, C.L.I.F. 3 and Blessings to break the 1 million mark.

The show topped the viewership charts of MediaCorp Channel 8 dramas for that year, with an average viewership of 1.04 million viewers each night, with the finale episode drawing more than 1.1 million viewers. It is also the most watched Channel 8-Wawa production to date.

== Plot ==
Zhao Yaozong, is a middle-aged man who works as an assistant horse trainer. He loved horses since he was a kid and trained hard through the years to realise his dream of becoming a champion horse trainer. His mentor was retiring and he thought that his chance had finally come only to see the place snatched away by a foreign horse trainer, Enlai. Enlai became his superior and proposed many changes. Yaozong was afraid of inviting trouble and slogged his guts out but still didn't meet the expectations of his boss.

Yaozong has three children. The eldest son, Zhao Youting, is working as a gym instructor after his graduation. His daughter, Zhao Xiaomin, who is still schooling, dreams of becoming a singer one day. His youngest son, Zhao Chenglong, is facing the stress of PSLE. Yaozong is being bullied at work but puts up a front in front of his family to maintain his integrity of being a father figure. Deep inside, he feels terrible but he puts on a brave smile everyday just so he doesn't lose the respect of his family.

Yaozong meets a mysterious old woman who sells tissue paper. She wants to give him three wishes for him to fulfil what his heart desires. He does not believe her. Nevertheless, she leaves him with three coins for his wishes.

Enlai wants to force Yaozong to resign. He speaks behind his back and makes things difficult for him. Yaozong does not want to lose this job and be separated from his precious horses. He thought of the old woman and the three wishes. Although still sceptical, he decided to make a wish.

A miracle happens. Yaozong manages to complete an almost impossible task and is praised by the horse owner. He starts to grow in confidence. Xiaomin meets with an accident while chasing her idol and is trapped in the car. Her family realises she is missing and searches for her frantically. Yaozong decides to use his second wish and they rescue Xiaomin to safety.

Yaozong thinks that life has changed for the better, until he finds out that his wife, Zeng Shanmei, has contracted a terminal illness. He tells her not to worry as he will use his last wish on her. He tells her all about the three wishes and the mysterious old woman. To his surprise, Shanmei tells him that she had arranged all these to give him confidence. She bribed the old woman to lie to Yaozong. She knew she had this illness all along but did not want him to worry. She thought of this plan, hoping that Yaozong and the family can continue living comfortably after she passes on.

Yaozong is devastated to learn that his three wishes were fake. Nevertheless, he uses the third wish coin to wish that Shanmei will be cured. Miraculously, his wish came true. After Shanmei recovers, she wants him to believe that the miracles were not caused by pure luck so she arranges for him and the old woman to meet. When they eventually meet, Yaozong exclaims that the wishes were true! The old woman that Shanmei arranged to meet was not the one that Yaozong met in the park that night.

When the mysterious old woman appears in front of Yaozong again, he gets greedy and request for three more wishes. She tells him that the previous three were given without asking for anything in return. However, if he were to ask for more wishes, the next three wishes will be granted in exchange for something else. The greater his wish, the greater the price he will have to pay. Nonetheless, he insists on getting the three wishes.

What price is Yaozong's family willing to pay for the wishes? Will Yaozong's family succeed in breaking this curse or be stuck in this never-ending chain reaction of unfortunate events?

== Episodes ==
No.	Title	Original release date
1	"Episode One"	October 27, 2014
2	"Episode Two"	October 28, 2014
3	"Episode Three"	October 29, 2014
4	"Episode Four"	October 30, 2014
5	"Episode Five"	October 31, 2014
6	"Episode Six"	November 3, 2014
7	"Episode Seven"	November 4, 2014
8	"Episode Eight"	November 5, 2014
9	"Episode Nine"	November 6, 2014
10	"Episode Ten"	November 7, 2014
11	"Episode Eleven"	November 10, 2014
12	"Episode Twelve"	November 11, 2014
13	"Episode Thirteen"	November 12, 2014
14	"Episode Fourteen"	November 13, 2014
15	"Episode Fifteen"	November 14, 2014
16	"Episode Sixteen"	November 17, 2014
17	"Episode Seventeen"	November 18, 2014
18	"Episode Eighteen"	November 19, 2014
19	"Episode Nineteen"	November 20, 2014
20	"Episode Twenty"	November 21, 2014

== Cast ==
=== Main cast ===
- Zhu Xiufeng as Granny 纸巾婆婆.
- Thomas Ong as Zhao Yaozong 赵耀宗, Zeng Shanmei's husband and former assistant horse trainer
  - Ivan Lo as young Zhao.
- Huang Biren as Zeng Shanmei 曾善美, Zhao Yaozong's wife
- Zhu Houren as Zhao Haiguang 赵海光, Zhao Yaozong's father
- Jin Yinji as Yang Bamei 杨八妹, Zhao Yaozong's mother
- Shane Pow as Zhao Youting 赵佑庭, Zhao Yaozong's eldest son
- Julie Tan as Zhao Xiaomin 赵晓敏, Zhao Yaozong's daughter
- Tan Junsheng 陈俊生 as Zhao Chenglong 赵成龙, Zhao Yaozong's youngest son
- Yao Wenlong as Zhao Yaozu 赵耀祖, Anna's husband
  - Li Hong as young Zhao

=== Supporting cast ===
Cast	Role	Description
Apple Hong	Anna 安娜	Main Villain; Zhao Yaozu's wife Zhao Haiguang and Yang Bamei's daughter-in-law Zhao Yaozong's sister-in-law Zhao Youting, Zhao Xiaomin and Zhao Chenglong's aunt Tried many ways to get the wishing coin from Yaozong and Shanmei
Hayley Woo	Winnie Guo	Guo Shiming's daughter Zhao Youting's wife
Jiahao 家豪	Dai Enlai 戴恩来	Horse Trainer; Dislikes Zhao Yaozhong
Jeffrey Xu	Volunteer Lin 林义工	Zhao Xiaomin's fiancé Likes Zhao Xiaomin
Darren Lim	Huijing 辉京	Zeng Shanmei's friend
Lawrence Wong	Junhao 君豪	Zhao Xiaomin's ex-boyfriend Deceived Xiaomin
Wang Yuqing	Guo Shiming	Winnie Guo's Father; Zhao Youting's father-in-law Zhao Yaozong's ex-employer
Li Dan	Caihua 蔡花	Came from China; Salesgirl; Ex-beer seller Ex-Prostitute; Zhao Haiguang's friend
Jesseca Liu	Guest appearance 特别嘉宾	It appears that she is the next victim of the Granny as she was given three wishing coins by the Granny, leaving the show in a cliffhanger
Gabriel Wong	Kim Min Joon	Zhao Xiao Min's idol

== Reception ==
=== Ratings ===
The first two episodes of the drama received more than a million viewers each. For six episodes out of the initial nine episodes, viewership exceeded 1 million. The highest was 1.086 million viewers which broke record for a single episode viewership number.

The show topped the viewership charts of MediaCorp Channel 8 dramas for that year, with an average viewership of 1.04 million viewers each night, with the finale episode drawing more than 1.1 million viewers.

In 2015, it was announced Three Wishes became the highest rated Singaporean drama series for 2014, followed by C.L.I.F. 3.

=== Accolades ===
Despite the popularity of the drama and the largely favourable comeback of Huang Biren, Huang was not nominated for the Star Awards as she was a contract artiste with Mediacorp and not affiliated with any artiste management agency.

Organisation	Year	Category	Nominees	Result	Ref.
Star Awards	2015	Young Talent Award	Tan Jun Sheng	Nominated	
Star Awards	2015	Top Rated Drama Serial	—N/a	Won	
Star Awards	2015	Best Actor	Thomas Ong	Nominated	
Star Awards	2015	Best Supporting Actress	Julie Tan	Nominated	
Star Awards	2015	Best Drama Serial	—N/a	Nominated	
Star Awards	2015	BottomSlim Sexiest Legs Award	Julie Tan	Won	

== Sequel ==
The drama series had a spinoff sequel, Three Little Wishes, a 13-episode kids drama which debuted on 25 December 2016.

== See also ==
- List of programmes broadcast by Mediacorp Channel 8
