= Star Awards 2015 =

Singaporean television awards

Star Awards 2015 红星大奖2015
- Sponsored by: Calbee; Seng Choon Eggs; LG; Simmons; Chan Brothers Travel
- Date: 19 April 2015 - Show 1; 26 April 2015 - Show 2
- Location: Mediacorp TV Theatre
- Country: Singapore
- Presented by: BottomSlim; London Choco Roll; Tokyo Bust Express
- Hosted by: Show 1: Dennis Chew; Dasmond Koh; Lee Teng; Kate Pang; Walk of Fame / Post-show: Dasmond Koh; Lee Teng; Kate Pang; Show 2: Guo Liang; Pornsak; Quan Yi Fong

Highlights
- Most awards: Drama: The Journey: Tumultuous Times (7); Variety/Info-ed: The Joy Truck (season 2) (3)
- Most nominations: Drama: The Journey: Tumultuous Times (17); Variety/Info-ed: Finding 8 Star Awards 20 (4 each)
- Best Drama: The Journey: Tumultuous Times
- Best Variety Show: The Joy Truck (season 2)
- All-time Favourite Artiste: Jeanette Aw; Vivian Lai
- Website: "Official website". Archived from the original on 22 April 2015.

Television/radio coverage
- Network: Mediacorp Channel 8
- Runtime: 180 mins (both presentations); 90 mins (Walk of Fame); 60 mins (Post-show); 15 mins (Prelude)

Star Awards 2015 (also SA2015, Chinese: 红星大奖2015) is a double television award ceremony which is held in Singapore. It is part of the annual Star Awards organised by Mediacorp for free-to-air channel Mediacorp Channel 8. SA2015 is broadcast live on Channel 8, on 19 April 2015 and 26 April 2015. This was the final ceremony to be held at Caldecott Hill before the campus was relocated to one-north at Stars Avenue in the subsequent year, henceforth the subtitles for the ceremony name itself.

The ceremony saw the second season of The Joy Truck and The Journey trilogy, Tumultuous Times, became the biggest winning variety and drama series respectively. In voting categories, Qi Yuwu and Rui En won their tenth Top 10 awards while Jeanette Aw won an unprecedented seven awards during the ceremony, the most for any artiste, including the All-time Favourite Artiste together with Vivian Lai.

== Programme details ==
Date	Shows	Time	Channel	Simulcast on
3 April 2015 to 24 April 2015	Star Awards 2015 Prelude	10.30 pm to 10.45 pm	Mediacorp Channel 8	—N/a
19 April 2015	Star Awards 2015 Show 1	7pm to 10 pm	Mediacorp Channel 8	Toggle; Mediacorp Channel 8
26 April 2015	Star Awards 2015 Walk of Fame	5.00 pm to 6.30 pm	Mediacorp Channel 8	Toggle; Mediacorp Channel 8
26 April 2015	Star Awards 2015 Show 2	7pm to 10 pm	Mediacorp Channel 8	Toggle; Mediacorp Channel 8 Astro AEC; Astro AEC HD
26 April 2015	Star Awards 2015 Post Show Party	10.30 pm to 11.30 pm	Mediacorp Channel 8	Toggle; Mediacorp Channel 8

== Nominees and winners ==
Unless otherwise stated, the winners are listed first, highlighted in boldface.

=== Show 1 ===
The first show, titled "加利谷闪耀星光" (The Starlight of Caldecott), was broadcast on 19 April 2015.

==== Professionally judged awards ====
**Young Talent Award**: **Damien Teo – The Journey: Tumultuous Times**; Chloe Ng Ying En – Blessings; Ivan Lo – World at Your Feet; Gary Tan Yi Feng – The Journey: Tumultuous Times; Tan Jun Sheng – Three Wishes	**Best Theme Song**: **Kelvin Tan and Joi Chua – The Journey: Tumultuous Times – 《信·约》**; Lin Si Tong – Against The Tide – 《黑翼心灵》; Chriz Tong – Blessings – 《祖先保佑》; ah5ive – C.L.I.F. 3 – 《一念之差》; Power Station – World at Your Feet – 《逐梦》
**Best Director**: **Loh Woon Woon – Against The Tide**; Loo Yin Kam – The Journey: Tumultuous Times; Doreen Yap Pei Kiang – The Journey: Tumultuous Times; Wong Foong Hwee – World at Your Feet; Png Keh Hock – C.L.I.F. 3	**Best Screenplay**: **Tang Yeow and Cheong Yan Peng – Blessings**; Ang Eng Tee – The Journey: Tumultuous Times; Ng Kah Huay – The Caregivers; Phang Kai Yee – Against The Tide; Tang Yeow, Cheong Yan Peng and Seah Choon Guan – C.L.I.F. 3
**Best Variety Producer**: **Kang Lay See – Finding 8**; Mandy Tan – Say It! (Season 2); Alfred Yeo – Food Source (Season 4); Gan Bee Khim – Star Awards 2014; Tan Moon Hwa – ComChest Care & Share Charity Show 2014	**Best Variety Research Writer**: **Lim Kar Yee – The Joy Truck (season 2)**; Sheffie Liang – Food Source (season 4); Wong Eng Hong – Neighbourhood Chef; Lin Shih Han – Star Awards 2014; Lam Yen Fong – Lunar New Year's Eve Special 2014
**Best Programme Promo**: **Kee Chee Wee – Against The Tide**; Teo Jun Jie – Project SuperStar (season 3); Loo Li Min – Finding 8; Chen Pei Jun – Hello Singapore; Chia Jia Xin – Morning Express	**Best Costume & Image Design**: **Annie Chua Yi Jun – Lunar New Year's Eve Special 2014**; Ivan Goh Eu Jin – Yes We Can!; Tee Yu Yan – The Caregivers; Xu Ying Ying – The Journey: Tumultuous Times; Justin Lee Zhen An – World at Your Feet
**Best Cameraman for Drama Programme**: **Ang Soon Bee – Against The Tide**; Toh Meng Teck – Blessings; Steve Wong – The Journey: Tumultuous Times; Tommy Lee – World at Your Feet; Steve Wong – The Caregivers	**Best Music & Sound Design**: **Gao Jun Wei and Zheng Kai Hua – C.L.I.F. 3**; Gao Jun Wei and Yong Chin Liang – Against The Tide; Teng Phek Yhen Matthew and Leong Mei Han – Blessings; Zheng Kai Hua and Thong Meng Sum – World at Your Feet; Gao Jun Wei and Zheng Kai Hua – The Journey: Tumultuous Times

^1 Lim was absent during the ceremony due to illness; Kang Lay See represented the award on his behalf.

==== Awards eligible for voting ====
**Favourite Male Character**: **Zhang Zhenhuan – World at Your Feet as Gao Guotian 高过天**; Aloysius Pang – World at Your Feet as Fang Yangming 方扬名; Elvin Ng – – World at Your Feet as Wu Weixiong 吴伟雄; Xu Bin – Against The Tide as Guo Jingcheng (Cartoon) 郭精诚; Romeo Tan – The Journey: Tumultuous Times as Zhang Yan 张晏	**Favourite Female Character**: **Jeanette Aw – The Journey: Tumultuous Times as Hong Minghui 洪明慧**; Felicia Chin – In The Name of Love as Pan Xiaomin 潘小敏; Kimberly Chia – World at Your Feet as Ye Xiaofeng 叶晓枫; Rebecca Lim – Yes We Can! as Zhang Xueqin 张雪芹; Rui En – Against The Tide as Qiu Xueqing 邱雪清
**Favourite Onscreen Couple**: **Zhang Zhenhuan and Jeanette Aw** – World at Your Feet; Li Nanxing ^{1} and Rui En – C.L.I.F. 3; Qi Yuwu ^{1} and Joanne Peh ^{1} and – C.L.I.F. 3; Romeo Tan and Rebecca Lim – Yes We Can!; Ian Fang and Kimberly Chia – World at Your Feet

==== Most Popular Regional Artiste award ====
The award is based on online voting done in the 4 territories; Indonesia, China, Malaysia and Cambodia.

**China**	**Christopher Lee^{2}**
**Malaysia**	**Jeanette Aw**
**Indonesia**	**Jeanette Aw**
**Cambodia**	**Jeanette Aw**

Lee was absent and did not receive the award personally as he was still filming in Taiwan.

==== Special awards ====
**Rocket Award**	**Shaun Chen**
**Social Media Award**	**Jeanette Aw**

===== Viewership awards =====
**Top Rated Drama Serial 2014**	**Three Wishes**
**Top Rated Variety Series 2014**	**Cheap and Good**

=== Show 2 ===
The second show, titled "加利谷颁奖典礼" (Award Ceremony of Caldecott), was broadcast on 26 April 2015.

==== Professionally judged awards ====
**Best Drama Serial**: **The Journey: Tumultuous Times**; Against The Tide; Blessings; C.L.I.F. 3; Three Wishes	**Best Variety Programme**: **The Joy Truck (season 2)**; Back to School; Body SOS (season 3); Food Source (season 4); Neighbourhood Chef
**Best Variety Special**: **Star Awards 2014 – Show 2**; ComChest Care & Share Charity Show 2014; Lunar New Year's Eve Special 2014; Star Awards 2014 – Show 1; Project SuperStar (Season 3) Grand Final	**Best Info-ed Programme**: **Tuesday Report: The Towkays 2**; A Taste of History; Hear Me Out; Job X-Change; Where To Stay
**Best Actor**: **Shaun Chen – The Journey: Tumultuous Times as Hu Jia / Zhang Jia 胡佳 / 张佳**; Chen Hanwei – Blessings as Lian Daxi 连大喜; Christopher Lee – Against The Tide as Di Shen 狄深; Qi Yuwu – C.L.I.F. 3 as Tang Yew Jia 唐耀佳; Thomas Ong – Three Wishes as Zhao Yaozong 赵耀宗	**Best Actress**: **Rebecca Lim – Yes We Can! as Zhang Xueqin 张雪芹**; Joanne Peh – C.L.I.F. 3 as Leow Xin Yi 廖心怡; Rui En – Against The Tide as Qiu Xueqing 邱雪清; Yvonne Lim – World at Your Feet as Zheng Yongyi 郑永仪; Felicia Chin – The Journey: Tumultuous Times as Zhang Min 张敏
**Best Supporting Actor**: **Chen Hanwei – The Journey: Tumultuous Times as Hu Weiren 胡为人**; Aloysius Pang – Against The Tide as Zhao Keji; Chen Shucheng – Blessings as Lian Mengyong 连梦勇; Zhang Zhenhuan – Against The Tide as Zhuo Dingkang 卓定康; Zhu Houren – In The Name of Love as Wang Weiguo 王伟国	**Best Supporting Actress**: **Joanne Peh – The Journey: Tumultuous Times as Zhang Huiniang 张蕙娘**; Carrie Wong – The Journey: Tumultuous Times as Bai Lanxiang (Sweet Soup Lass) 白兰香 (糖水妹); Julie Tan – Three Wishes as Zhao Xiaomin 赵晓敏; Paige Chua – Against The Tide as Zhang Jingxuan 张静璇; Xiang Yun – The Caregivers as Molly
**Best Variety Show Host**: **Pornsak – The Joy Truck (Season 2)**; Mark Lee – Neighbourhood Chef; Lee Teng – Finding 8; Quan Yi Fong – Black Rose 2; Ben Yeo – Finding 8	**Best Info-ed Programme Host**: **Quan Yi Fong – Where To Stay**; Pornsak – Shop Stories; Bryan Wong – Hear Me Out; Ben Yeo – Meet My Family 2; Youyi – My HeARTland Carnival
**Best News Story**: **Ng Lian Cheong – AirAsia Incident**; Chng Kheng Leng – Neoh Chia Nee Farm Lease; Hu Jielan – Changi Dead Fish; Lip Kwok Wai – URA Extend New F&B Outlet Ban; Loi Kar Yee – People's Park Scam
**Best Current Affairs Story**: **Chan Wai Hoe – Focus – The Evolution of the Chinese Indonesian Society**; Goh Chye Kim, Yap Li Ling, Raymond Foong and Francis Ng – Frontline – Differentiating Genuine and Fake Charity Donations; Cheng Tee Yin, Chew Wen Jing and Soh Bee Lan – Frontline – Errant Retailers at Sim Lim Square; Grace Yang – Focus – Hong Kong's Political Unrest; Tang Ai Wei and Neoh Chia Nee – Money Week – Rising Customs Fees
**Best Newcomer Award**: **Aloysius Pang**; Hong Ling; Seraph Sun; Nick Teo; Carrie Wong

==== All Time Favourite Artiste ====
This award is a special achievement award given out to artiste(s) who have achieved a maximum of 10 popularity awards over 10 years. Top 10 winning years the recipients were awarded together are highlighted in boldface.

**All Time Favourite Artiste**	**Vivian Lai**	2001 | **2003** | **2004** | 2007 | **2009** | **2010** | **2011** | **2012** | **2013** | **2014**
**All Time Favourite Artiste**	**Jeanette Aw**	**2003** | **2004** | 2005 | 2006 | **2009** | **2010** | **2011** | **2012** | **2013** | **2014**

==== Awards eligible for voting ====
**BottomSlim Sexiest Legs Award**: **Julie Tan**; Priscelia Chan; Belinda Lee; Kate Pang; Carrie Wong	**Tokyo Bust Express Sexy Babe Award**: **Hong Ling**; Paige Chua; Belinda Lee; Sora Ma; Kate Pang
**London Choco Roll Happiness Award**: **Rebecca Lim – Yes We Can! as Zhang Xueqin 张雪芹**; Shaun Chen – Blessings as Lian Wending' 连文鼎; Sora Ma – C.L.I.F. 3 as Weng Xuanmei (Jelly) 翁选美; Julie Tan – In The Name of Love as Bai Xiaoshan 白小珊; Romeo Tan – Yes We Can! as Liu Junwei 刘骏卫

==== Top 10 awards ====
Since the 2012 awards, results for the Top 10 Most Popular Male and Female Artistes were determined by telepoll and online voting, each carrying a 50% weightage towards the final results. The telepoll lines were announced, and opened on 9 March 2015 in its first public event held at VivoCity. The voting closed on 26 April at 8:30 pm, during the second award ceremony.

The nominees are listed in telepoll line order. The results of the Top 10 awards are not in any rank order.

Note	Description
Italic	New to list (Not nominated last year).
**Bold**	Awardees who made it to the Show 2 top 10.
	Made it to top 10 in the week / Fall under the Top n category.
n	How many of this awards the awardee got.
**10**	To be awarded the All-Time Favourite Artiste in the next Star Awards.

Stage:	Start date	**9 Mar**	**16 Mar**	**23 Mar**	**30 Mar**	**6 Apr**	**13 Apr**	**Show 2**	
Stage:	End date / Position	**15 Mar**	**22 Mar**	**29 Mar**	**5 Apr**	**12 Apr**	**19 Apr**	Top 18	Top 10
Telepoll lines	Artistes	Results							
Top 10 Most Popular Male Artistes
**1900-112-2001**	Dennis Chew								
**1900-112-2002**	Chen Shucheng								
**1900-112-2003**	Terence Cao								
**1900-112-2004**	**Lee Teng**								3
**1900-112-2005**	**Ian Fang**								1
**1900-112-2006**	Zhu Houren								
**1900-112-2007**	**Shane Pow**								1
**1900-112-2008**	Pierre Png								
**1900-112-2009**	Marcus Chin								
**1900-112-2010**	**Elvin Ng**								9
**1900-112-2011**	**Romeo Tan**								2
**1900-112-2012**	**Qi Yuwu**								**10**
**1900-112-2013**	**Xu Bin**								2
**1900-112-2014**	Zheng Geping								
**1900-112-2015**	Thomas Ong								
**1900-112-2016**	**Dasmond Koh**								8
**1900-112-2017**	Desmond Tan								
**1900-112-2018**	**Pornsak**								5
**1900-112-2019**	Guo Liang								
**1900-112-2020**	**Shaun Chen**								1
Top 10 Most Popular Female Artistes
**1900-112-2021**	**Rebecca Lim**								4
**1900-112-2022**	Christina Lim								
**1900-112-2023**	Jayley Woo								
**1900-112-2024**	**Carrie Wong**								1
**1900-112-2025**	**Kym Ng**								7
**1900-112-2026**	**Quan Yi Fong**								9
**1900-112-2027**	Youyi								
**1900-112-2028**	**Rui En**								**10**
**1900-112-2029**	**Julie Tan**								1
**1900-112-2030**	**Joanne Peh**								9
**1900-112-2031**	Chris Tong								
**1900-112-2032**	**Belinda Lee**								3
**1900-112-2033**	Priscelia Chan								
**1900-112-2034**	Hong Huifang								
**1900-112-2035**	**Paige Chua**								2
**1900-112-2036**	Ya Hui								
**1900-112-2037**	**Felicia Chin**								5
**1900-112-2038**	Jin Yinji								
**1900-112-2039**	Tracy Lee								
**1900-112-2040**	Lin Meijiao								

=== Post show party awards ===
**i Most Stylish Award (Female)**: **Paige Chua**	**i Most Stylish Award (Male)**: **Bryan Wong**
**Y.E.S. 93.3FM Award**: **Vivian Lai**	**Asian Skin Solutions Most Radiant Skin Award**: **Vivian Lai**
**Toggle Outstanding Duke Award**: **Xu Bin**; Ian Fang; Aloysius Pang; Shane Pow; Desmond Tan; Romeo Tan; Jeffrey Xu; Zhang Zhenhuan

== Statistics ==
Shows are ordered based on number of nominations, release date and type order.

Drama series nominations:

Nominations	Drama series
17	The Journey: Tumultuous Times
14	Against The Tide
13	World at Your Feet
10	C.L.I.F. 3
9	Blessings
6	Yes We Can! 我们一定行！
5	Three Wishes
4	The Caregivers
3	In The Name of Love

Drama series awards:

Awards	Drama series
7	The Journey: Tumultuous Times 信约：动荡的年代
3	Against The Tide 逆潮
2	Yes We Can 我们一定行！
2	World at Your Feet 球在你脚下
1	C.L.I.F. 3 警徽天职3
1	Blessings 祖先保佑
1	Three Wishes 三个愿望

Variety / info-ed series nominations:

Nominations	Variety / info-ed series
4	Star Awards 20 红星大奖20
4	Finding 8 先锋争8战
3	Lunar New Year's Eve Special 2014 骏马奔腾喜迎春
3	Food Source IV 食在好源头 IV
3	Neighbourhood Chef 邻里厨王
3	The Joy Truck II 快乐速递 II
2	ComChest Care & Share Charity Show 2014 爱分享 分享爱
2	Project SuperStar 2014 绝对SuperStar 2014
2	Where To Stay 到底住哪里？
2	Hear Me Out 有话要说
1	Cheap and Good 便宜有好货
1	Black Rose 2 爆料黑玫瑰2
1	Say It! (Season 2) 好好说 慢慢讲！ 2
1	A Taste of History 寻味地图
1	My HeARTland Carnival 邻邻艺计划
1	Meet My Family 2 人气满屋2
1	Shop Stories 有故事的店
1	Job X-Change 职业交换生
1	Tuesday Report 星期二特写

Variety / info-ed / current affairs series awards:

Awards	Variety / info-ed / current affairs series
3	The Joy Truck II 快乐速递 II
1	Lunar New Year's Eve Special 2014 骏马奔腾喜迎春
1	Cheap and Good 便宜有好货
1	Finding 8 先锋争8战
1	Star Awards 20 红星大奖20
1	Where To Stay 到底住哪里？
1	Tuesday Report 星期二特写
1	Focus 焦点

Current affairs series nominations:

Nominations	Current affairs series
2	Focus 焦点
2	Frontline 前线追踪
1	Money Week 财经追击
1	Morning Express 晨光第一线
1	Hello Singapore 狮城有约

== Presenters and performers ==
The following individuals presented awards or performed musical numbers.

=== Show 1 ===
Artistes / Special guests	Role (if applicable)	Presented / Performed
John Kuek 郑炳泰	—N/a	Announcer for Star Awards 2015 Show 1
Chen Yixi 陈一熙; Tay Ying 郑颖; Chantelle Ng 黄暄婷	—N/a	Presenter of the award for Young Talent Award
Hong Huifang	Dai Ah Xiu 戴阿秀 (Samsui Women)	Presenter of the award for Best Costume & Image Design
Hong Huifang	Lin-He Xiangniang 林何香娘 (Good Luck)	Presenter of the award for Best Costume & Image Design
Chen Hanwei	Wenqiang 文强 (Cupid Love)	Presenter of the award for Best Costume & Image Design
Chen Hanwei	Hu Weiren 胡为人 (The Journey: Tumultuous Times)	Presenter of the award for Best Costume & Image Design
Kym Ng; Bryan Wong	—N/a	Presenter of the awards for Best Cameraman for Drama Programme
Zoe Tay Desmond Sim 沈金兴	—N/a	Pretty Faces Fame; Presenter of the award for Best Music & Sound Design
Li Rongde 李荣德 Lin De Cheng 林德成	—N/a	Presenter of the award for Best Music & Sound Design
Juz B	—N/a	Performed《祖先保佑》 from Blessings
Brods	—N/a	Performed 《逐梦》 from World at Your Feet
Chew Sin Huey	—N/a	Performed 《黑翼心灵》 from Against The Tide
Nic Lee from Mi Lu Bing	—N/a	Performed 《一念之差》 from C.L.I.F. 3
Alfred Sim Bonnie Loo	—N/a	Performed 《信·约》from The Journey: Tumultuous Times
Jack Neo	Liang Po Po 梁婆婆	Liang Po Po skit Presenter of the award for Best Programme Promo
Mark Lee	'Use Me' Dustbin "请用我" 垃圾桶	Liang Po Po skit Presenter of the award for Best Programme Promo
Dr. Leslie Tay	—N/a	Presenter of the award for Social Media Award; Performed "Unbelievable"
Jamie Chua	—N/a	Presenter of the award for Social Media Award; Performed "Unbelievable"
Chen Tianwen	Mr. Unbelievable 不可思议难以置信先生	Presenter of the award for Social Media Award; Performed "Unbelievable"
Vivian Lai	Jeanette Aw	"7 Princesses" spoof skit Presenter of the awards for Best Director and Best Screenplay
Kym Ng	Jesseca Liu	"7 Princesses" spoof skit Presenter of the awards for Best Director and Best Screenplay
Priscelia Chan	Dawn Yeoh	"7 Princesses" spoof skit Presenter of the awards for Best Director and Best Screenplay
Lina Ng	Felicia Chin (from The Journey: Tumultuous Times)	"7 Princesses" spoof skit Presenter of the awards for Best Director and Best Screenplay
Quan Yi Fong	Fiona Xie (inspired by My Genie 我爱精灵)	"7 Princesses" spoof skit Presenter of the awards for Best Director and Best Screenplay
Kate Pang	Rui En (inspired by Against The Tide)	"7 Princesses" spoof skit Presenter of the awards for Best Director and Best Screenplay
Chua En Lai	Joanne Peh (inspired by The "Mole" Makers 痣在四方)	"7 Princesses" spoof skit Presenter of the awards for Best Director and Best Screenplay
Guo Liang	T.O.P	"Big Bang" spoof skit (as "Big Bank"); Performed "Fantastic Baby" (fruits version); Presenter of the awards for Best Variety Research Writer and Best Variety Producer
Jeremy Chan	G-Dragon	"Big Bang" spoof skit (as "Big Bank"); Performed "Fantastic Baby" (fruits version); Presenter of the awards for Best Variety Research Writer and Best Variety Producer
Dennis Chew	Taeyang	"Big Bang" spoof skit (as "Big Bank"); Performed "Fantastic Baby" (fruits version); Presenter of the awards for Best Variety Research Writer and Best Variety Producer
Mediacorp CEO; Shaun Seow 萧文光	—N/a	Presenter of the awards for Most Popular Regional Artiste Awards
Mediacorp chairman Teo Ming Kian 张铭坚	—N/a	Gave out the awards for Top Rated Drama Serial and Top Rated Variety Series
Guo Liang; Quan Yi Fong; Jeremy Chan Vivian Lai	—N/a	Hosts and Assistant Hosts of "What Your School Doesn't Teach You" (学校没教的事); Presenter of the awards for Favourite Male Character and Favourite Female Character
Member of Parliament, Tampines GRC; Baey Yam Keng	—N/a	Gave out the award for Rocket Award
Chen Shucheng Xiang Yun Li Yinzhu Zhu Houren	—N/a	Presenter of the award for Favourite Onscreen Couple

=== Show 2 ===
Artistes / Special guests	Presented / Performed
John Kuek 郑炳泰	Announcer for Star Awards 2015 Show 2
Li Nanxing Zoe Tay	Gave their opening monologue
Mediacorp Artistes	Cast entrance on stage (in order of appearance): World at Your Feet, Yes We Can, The Journey: Tumultuous Times, Three Wishes, In The Name of Love, Soup of Life/Entangled, Against The Tide, The Caregivers, Blessings, C.L.I.F. 3, 118, Hosts and Presenters
Paul S.D. Lee 李四端	Presenter of the awards for Best News Story and Best Current Affairs Story awards
Sasa 莎莎 Calvin Chen	Presenter of the awards for Best Info-ed Programme Host and Best Info-ed Programme awards
Yao Wenlong Guo Shu Yao	Presenter of the award for Best Newcomer award
Plungon 浩角翔起	Presenter of the awards for Best Variety Programme and Best Variety Special awards
Sam Tseng 曾国城; Chung Hsin-Ling 钟欣凌	Presenter of the award for Best Variety Show Host award
Jerry Lamb Ivana Wong	Presenter of the awards for Best Supporting Actress and Best Supporting Actor awards
Second Minister, Environment and Water Resources and Foreign Affairs; Grace Fu	Gave out the award for All Time Favourite Artiste award
Choi Hao-ran 崔浩然 Fon Cin	Presenter of the awards for Best Drama Serial award
Ella Chen 陈嘉华	Performed 《你正常吗》
Zoe Tay 郑惠玉; Li Nanxing; Huang Biren	Presenter of the award for Best Actress award
Ekin Cheng; Karen Mok	Presenter of the award for Best Actor award
Karen Mok	Performed 《看看》
Grasshoppers	Presenter of the award for Top 10 Most Popular Female Artistes award
Sam Tseng; Ella Chen	Presenter of the award for Top 10 Most Popular Male Artistes award

== Ceremony information ==
=== Award Information ===
For the first time since 2009, Mediacorp opt out a location for their second show, with both shows to be held inside the Mediacorp studios, as 2015 will mark its final year to be held at the former location of Caldecott Hill prior to the relocation of its campus at Mediapolis@one-north. The 2015 ceremony was also the last time where the first show presented Professional and Technical Awards during Show 1, and the last ceremony to feature long-time announcer John Kuek due to his retirement.

While the minimum quota requirement was raised to 10 last year in order for a professional and programme award category to be presented, three awards were not presented last year due to the changes, those being Best Current Affairs Presenter, Best News Presenter and Best Newcomer; of the three, only Best Newcomer returned while the other two did not, despite Channel 8 News & Current Affairs already had ten news presenters by the end of 2014; as of 2026, neither awards had been presented since 2013. The reason for this is unknown.

Jeanette Aw was the most trending celebrity in online social media as she won seven awards throughout the entire ceremony. In the backstage after Show 1, Aw announced that she would want to withdraw from voting-based award categories in the future, citing competition issues by her supporters; however, Mediacorp rejected her request due to the nominations being determined by online as she was renominated (and subsequently won) for them in the following year, but eventually led to a rework of all the voting categories by 2017. A viral video surfaced during Show 2 when Aw accidentally tripped on the stairway during the presentation for All-Time Favourite Artistes but quickly recovered with minor injuries. She even lampshade the fall by telling the viewers to rise again after, during her acceptance speech.

=== Consecutive and records in award categories, first in Top 10 ===
- The Joy Truck became the third variety program to win its second Best Variety Programme award, after City Beat and Say It If You Dare.
- Rui En became the seventh All-Time Favourite Artiste to win the award with ten consecutive Top 10 Female Favourite Artiste wins. Rui En, along with Qi Yuwu, were conferred the said award in the following year's ceremony.
  - The previous recipients to do so were Fann Wong and Xie Shaoguang, both occurring in the 2005 ceremony.
- Jeanette Aw set a record on winning the most awards for an individual at seven, among which were Most Popular Regional Artiste Awards (three, for Malaysia, Indonesia and Cambodia), Social Media Award, Favourite Female Character, Favourite Onscreen Couple (Drama) (with Zhang Zhenhuan, who they also won all the Favourite category awards) and All-Time Favourite Artiste (with Vivian Lai).
- Carrie Wong, Jayley Woo, Shane Pow and Youyi) were nominated for the Top 10 voting category for the first time.
  - Pow and Wong, along with Shaun Chen, Ian Fang and Julie Tan, won their first Top 10 Favourite Artiste award.
- The last time Felicia Chin nominated (and won) for the Top 10 Most Favourite Female Artiste was 2010; she switched to part-time acting to study for a Bachelor of Business Administration degree in the NUS Business School, quit her studies and has since returned to acting.
- The Best Drama Serial nomination for the third season of C.L.I.F. now tied The Unbeatables for its most nominations for its category at three. With the loss to The Journey: Tumultuous Times (which became the eighth drama to receive a second nomination), C.L.I.F. now holds the record for the most nominations without a win.
- Star Awards won its fifth consecutive "Best Variety Special" award, part of the five-win streak since the show won her first award in 2010 until its next loss in 2016.

=== Awards categories ===
- This was the first show to introduce the category for Tokyo Bust Express Sexy Babe Award.

=== Other trivia ===
- Jack Neo's comeback appearance as Liang Po Po in nearly 15 years.

== Accolades ==
The 2015 ceremony was nominated for Best Variety Producer and Best Variety Special in the ceremony next year, but were lost to Love on the Plate 3 and GeTai Challenge, respectively; for the latter, the loss ended a five-win streak of winning the "Best Variety Special" since Star Awards 2010.

Year	Ceremony	Category	Nominee	Result	Ref
2016	Star Awards	Best Variety Producer	Jean Toh 卓金云	Nominated	
2016	Star Awards	Best Variety Special	—N/a	Nominated	
2016	Star Awards	Best Variety Special	—N/a	Nominated	

== See also ==
- List of programmes broadcast by Mediacorp Channel 8
- Mediacorp Channel 8
- Star Awards
