= Youyi (actress) =

Singaporean television host (born 1980)

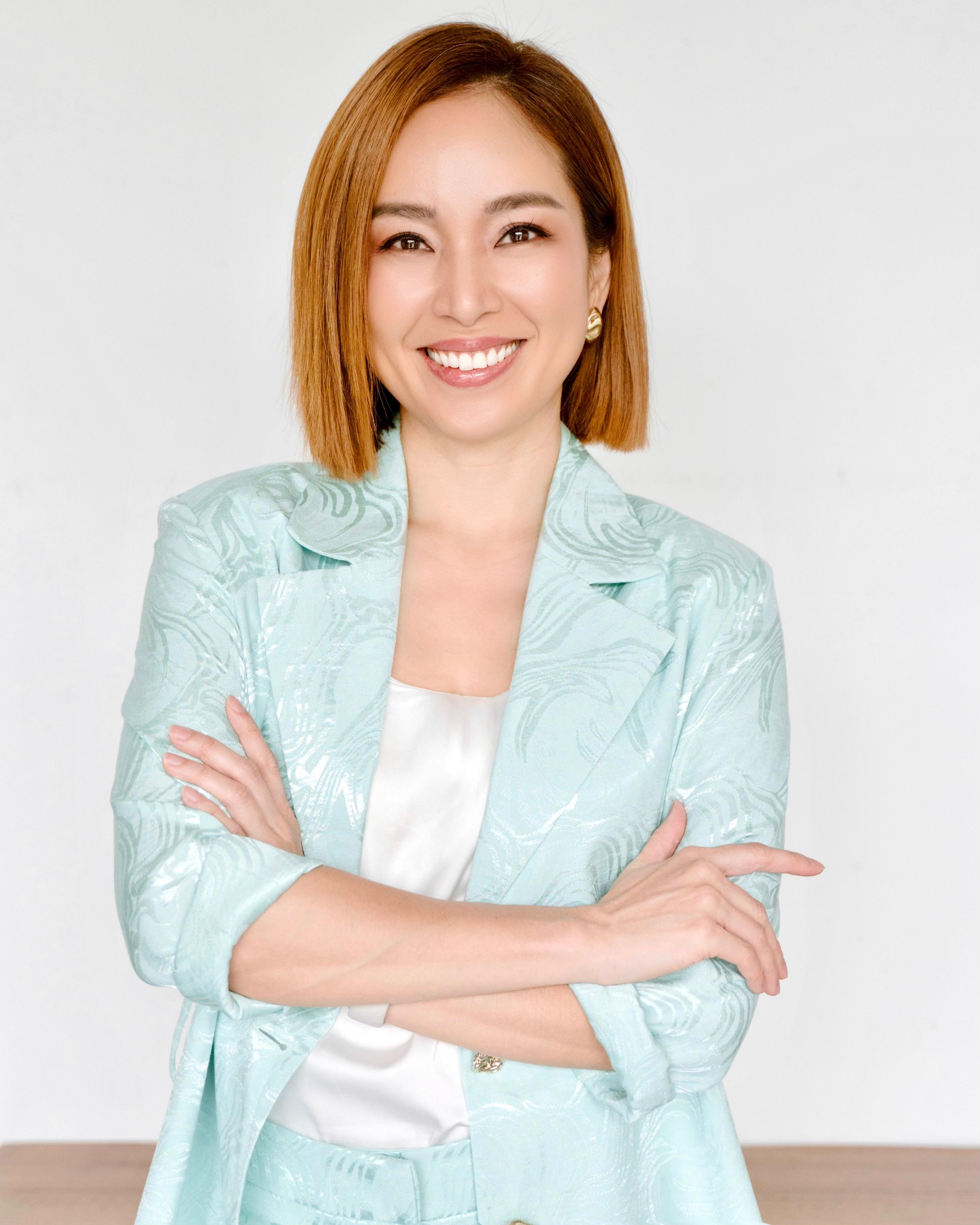
- Youyi in 2024
- Born: Iriana Halim; 11 October 1980 (age 46); British Hong Kong
- Other names: Lin Youyi; Iriana Youyi
- Education: Chung Cheng High School; Temasek Junior College; Nanyang Technological University; Singapore University of Social Sciences
- Occupations: Actress; host; corporate trainer
- Years active: 2005–present

Stage name
- Traditional Chinese: 有懿
- Simplified Chinese: 有懿
- Hanyu Pinyin: Yǒuyì

Birth name
- Traditional Chinese: 林有懿
- Simplified Chinese: 林有懿
- Hanyu Pinyin: Lín Yǒuyì
- Website: reallifecoaching.com

Lin Youyi (born Iriana Halim; 11 October 1980) is a Singaporean television host, current affairs presenter, actress and presentation trainer with R.E.A.L. Life Coaching.

She began her career as a radio DJ before signing to Mediacorp as a television presenter in 2008, after which she went into acting and hosting on television programmes.

Youyi was awarded the Best Current Affairs Presenter award for Good Morning Singapore at Star Awards 2012. She is currently one of the anchors for Hello Singapore on Mediacorp Channel 8 and one of the head trainers for R.E.A.L. Life Coaching.

== Early life ==
Youyi spent her childhood in Taipei, where she completed her elementary studies. She had then relocated, spending her adolescent years in Singapore, where she completed her high school at Chung Cheng High School and tertiary education in Temasek Junior College, and eventually pursuing a bachelor's degree in accountancy at Nanyang Technological University in 2003.

In 2008, Youyi decided to pursue her second university degree in translation and interpretation at SIM University (now Singapore University of Social Sciences) and was awarded the bronze award for academic excellence in "SPH Awards of Excellence".

== Career ==
Youyi begin her career with then Dongli 883 (now 883Jia ) as a producer presenter, before being invited to audition for a television presenter role in 2008.

Youyi made her television debut in 2008 on Mediacorp TV's Channel 8, as a current affairs presenter for Good Morning Singapore. She is currently one of the anchor hosts for Channel 8's evening prime time current affairs programme Hello Singapore. She pocketed her first TV award, Best Current Affairs Presenter award, at the Star Awards 2012. She was nominated for Best Info-Ed Programme Host at the Star Awards in 2014 and 2015.

She has hosted live shows and events such as Community Chest TV Charity Shows in 2011, 2013 and 2014, and hosted Chingay Parade Singapore yearly from 2013 to 2021. She frequently hosts programmes on Channel 8 and Channel U, particularly travelogues, which has attained high viewership ratings on Channel U. Some of these programs are subsequently acquired by media outlets such as Phoenix.

She was one of the "Most Popular Female Artist" nominees in the Star Awards in 2016.

Apart from hosting, Youyi is experienced in theatre, TV and movie. She has also incorporated some of these techniques into her current presentation training work.

Youyi parted ways with Mediacorp artist management unit in 2017, to assist her sister, Julina in her business.

Youyi and her sister, Julina, co-founded R.E.A.L. Life Coaching, a company that takes a holistic approach to presentation coaching, nutrition, and mental fitness.

Youyi specializes in presentation training, focusing on topics such as presentations, executive presence, storytelling, personal branding, and speaking on camera. She uses mental fitness as a foundation to help individuals speak with greater confidence, engage their audience, and gain buy-in from stakeholders.

Drawing from her experiences in television and theatre, as well as her academic background in Accounting and Translation/Interpretation, Youyi believes that instead of conforming, individuals should explore their unique qualities through a structured and guided process. This approach fosters sustainable transformation and enables them to become more charismatic speakers.

Additionally, Youyi is an accredited trainer under the Singapore WSQ Advanced Certificate in Learning and Performance certification.

== Filmography ==
=== Hosting ===
- 2008: Good Morning Singapore 早安您好
- 2011: ComChest TrueHearts 2011公益献爱心
- 2012: Starry Starry Night 2012 美好的一天-第四届中国新加坡大型歌会
- 2012: The Right One (TesTube实验室) 非你莫属
- 2012: Smart @ Work 上班不留白
- 2013: Hair Challenge 101 Series 8 护发动员101
- 2013: Silver Carnival 5 银色嘉年华5
- 2013: Smart @Work 2 上班不留白 2
- 2013: Chingay 2013 妆艺大游行 2013
- 2013: SPD Charity Show 2013 真情无障爱
- 2014 − Feb 2025: Hello Singapore 狮城有约
- 2014: ComChest Care & Share Charity Show 爱分享分享爱
- 2014: Where to Stay 到底住哪里
- 2014: Hair Challenge 101 Series 9 护发挑战101
- 2014: Silver Carnival 6 银色嘉年华6
- 2014: Silver Carnival 7 银色嘉年华7
- 2014: Silver Carnival 8 银色嘉年华8
- 2014: Star Awards 20 Walk of Fame 红星大奖20之星光大道
- 2014: Small Steps Big Future 小脚印,大志向
- 2014: Chingay 2014 妆艺大游行2014
- 2014: Lunar New Year Eve Show Special 2014 骏马奔腾喜迎春
- 2014: My Heartland Carnival 邻邻艺计划
- 2015: Voice of China 4 中国好声音第四季新加坡招募总决赛
- 2015: Silver Carnival 9 银色嘉年华 9
- 2015: Silver Carnival 10 银色嘉年华 10
- 2015: Hair Challenge 101 Series 10 护发挑战 101
- 2015: Smart @Work 3 上班不留白
- 2016: Chingay 2016 妆艺大游行2016
- 2017: Let's Go Dating 我们去相亲
- 2017: Chingay 2017 妆艺大游行2017

=== Television series ===
Year	Title	Role	Notes	Ref
2014	The Caregivers	Zhang Xiuya		
2014	In The Name of Love	Laura		
2014	Blessings	Ouyang Xuan		
2015	118	Xie Limei		
2015	A Blessed Life	Chen Jiexi		
2016	Don't Worry, Be Healthy	Wu Jiaxin		
2016	My First School	Kok Jingwen		
2016	If Only I Could	Huiling		
2016	The Gentlemen	Shen Yilin		
2016	Hero	Wang Xiuzhen		

=== Film ===
Year	Title	Role	Notes	Ref
2011	Heng or Huat (天降运财)			
2014	Filial Party			
2014	Ms J Contemplates Her Choice	Herself	Cameo	

== Theatre ==
Year	Title	Role	Notes
2007	Esplanade Hua Yi Festival Anniversary Game (十年之痒)		
2016	Crescendo the Musical	Irene Lin	

== Awards and nominations ==
Year	Ceremony	Category	Nominated work	Result	Ref.
2010	Star Awards	Best News/Current Affairs Presenter	Good Morning Singapore	Nominated	
2011	Star Awards	Best News/Current Affairs Presenter	Good Morning Singapore	Nominated	
2012	Star Awards	Best News/Current Affairs Presenter	Good Morning Singapore	Won	
2013	Star Awards	Best News/Current Affairs Presenter	Good Morning Singapore	Nominated	
2014	Star Awards	Best Info-Ed Programme Host	Smart @ Work	Nominated	
2015	Star Awards	Best Info-Ed Programme Host	My HeARTland Carnival	Nominated	
2015	Star Awards	Top 10 Most Popular Female Artistes	—N/a	Nominated	
2016	Star Awards	Top 10 Most Popular Female Artistes	—N/a	Nominated	
