= Zhu Xiufeng =

Singaporean actress (born in 1943 or 1944)

- Born: Choo Siew Fong; 1943 or 1944 (age 80–81)
- Other names: Choo Siew Feng
- Occupations: Actress; screenwriter; former publicity manager; TV and radio play writer; stage play reviewer
- Years active: 1950s−present
- Spouse: Unknown (div. 1975)
- Children: 2

Chinese name
- Traditional Chinese: 朱秀鳳
- Simplified Chinese: 朱秀凤
- Hanyu Pinyin: Zhū Xiùfèng

Zhu Xiufeng (born Choo Siew Fong in 1943 or 1944) is a Singaporean actress whose acting career spans more than six decades. She has performed on stage, in films and television. She has also worked as a screenwriter, a film company publicity manager, TV and radio play writer and a stage play reviewer.

== Career ==
Known for portraying creepy elderly women in supernatural shows and for her multiple antagonistic roles on television, Zhu began her career in theatre at the age of 14 when she was in Secondary One and joined the drama group Yingxin Alumni Association in 1959. In the early days of her career, Zhu was a part-time actress at Radio Television Singapore (RTS) and later Singapore Broadcasting Corporation (SBC) where she has also written scripts for at least four productions for children at the station. She also lent her voice to radio plays on SBC and Rediffusion, and started out in the latter's Mandarin radio plays in 1959. In 1975, she became a full-time actress for Chong Gay Theatres (later Overseas Movie Pte Ltd), a local film distributor and cinema company, and worked in three films before the company closed its studios. Following which, she switched to become a publicity manager for the distributor in 1981. She joined the Singapore Amateur Players, one of the oldest local Chinese drama groups, in 1968, and became the first batch of professional actors to be signed to local leading theatre group Practice Theatre Ensemble (now The Theatre Practice) when she was in her forties in 1986. In 1992, she left Practice Theatre Ensemble as their resident actress. In February 1990, she became a full-time actress at Singapore Broadcasting Corporation (SBC).

In 1995, Zhu won the inaugural Best Supporting Actress award at the 2nd Star Awards for her role as a demanding entrepreneur in Chronicle of Life.

== Personal life ==
Zhu has five other siblings and her parents are from Pontian District, Johor, Malaysia. Zhu grew up with her adoptive mother and only came to know her parentage in her twenties.

Zhu had a marriage which ended in 1975. She has a son and a daughter from the marriage.

Zhu currently lives by herself and has been practicing the Chinese martial arts Mulan Quan, Qigong and Tai chi as a hobby for more than 20 years.

== Selected filmography ==
Zhu has appeared in numerous television series and films.

=== Television series ===
- Evening Breeze (1983)
- The Flying Fish (1983)
- Little DD (1983)
- The Pursuit (1984)
- Journey's End (1990)
- Pretty Faces (1991)
- Secret Operation (1991)
- Working Class (1991(
- Black Phoenix (1991)
- Women of Substance (1992)
- Ride the Waves (1993)
- Shadow in the Dark (1994)
- Chronicle of Life (1995)
- Morning Express (1995)
- King of Hades (1995)
- Different Cuts Different Strokes (1997)
- My Wife, Your Wife, Their Wives (1997)
- The Legends of Jigong (1997)
- Rising Expectations (1997)
- Different Cuts Different Strokes 2 (1998)
- The New Adventures of Wisely (1998)
- Season of Love (1998)
- The Return of the Condor Heroes (1998)
- Different Cuts Different Strokes 3 (1999)
- Lost Soul (1999)
- Four Walls And A Ceiling (2000)
- The Hotel (2001)
- Bukit Ho Swee (2002)
- The Little Nyonya (2008)
- Folks Jump Over the Wall (2008)
- Daddy at Home (2009)
- Reunion Dinner (2009)
- With You (2010)
- Rescue 995 (2012)
- The Journey: A Voyage (2013)
- The Dream Makers (2013)
- Blessings (2014)
- Three Wishes (2014)
- The Journey: Tumultuous Times (2014)
- Scrum! (2014)
- The Caregivers (2014)
- World at Your Feet (2014)
- Good Luck (2015)
- You Can Be an Angel Too (2015)
- Hand in Hand (2015)
- You Can Be an Angel 2 (2016)
- Three Little Wishes (2016)
- Hero (2016)
- The Truth Seekers (2016)
- The Dream Job (2016)
- The Lead (2017)
- Eat Already? 2 (2017)
- Life Less Ordinary (2017)
- My Friends from Afar (2017)
- Reach for the Skies (2018)
- You Can Be an Angel 3 (2018)
- Jalan Jalan (2018)
- Fifty & Fabulous (2018)
- Fried Rice Paradise (2019)
- Hello from the Other Side - Its Time (2019)
- The Heartland Hero (2021)
- Mr Zhou's Ghost Stories@Job Haunting (2021)
- Key Witness (2021)
- Love At First Bite (2022)
- Mr Zhou's Ghost Stories@Job Haunting II (2022)
- Your World in Mine (2022)
- You Can Be An Angel 4 (2022)
- Fix My Life (2023)
- Shero (2023)
- Till the End (2023)
- Hungry Souls: From Hell, With Love (TBA)

=== Film ===
- Head of the Household
- The Absurd Family
- Two Sides of the Bridge (1978)
- Autumn Moon (1991)
- Wounded Tracks (1994)
- Fatal Memory (1995; telemovie)
- Life On the Line (1996; telemovie)
- Love Cuts (2010)
- Old Cow vs Tender Grass (2010)
- Ghost on Air (2012)
- Wet Season (2019)
- The Visitor List (2022; short film)
- What is Love (2023; short film)

=== Children programme scriptwriting ===
- Coffee Boy
- Good Friends
- Little Hearts

== Selected theatrical works ==
- The Silly Little Girl
- The Funny Old Tree
- The Little White Sailing Boat (1982)
- The Flying Swallow (1984)
- Kopi Tiam (1986)
- The Story of Procreation (1987)
- Thunderstorm (1988)

== Awards and nominations ==
Year	Award	Category	Nominated work	Result	Ref
1995	Star Awards 1995	Best Supporting Actress	Chronicle of Life	Won	
