= Yes We Can! (TV series) =

- 我们一定行
- Genre: Lunar New Year; Romance
- Written by: Lim Gim Lam 林锦兰 许丽雯
- Starring: Romeo Tan; Rebecca Lim; Xu Bin; Sora Ma; Chen Liping; Chen Hanwei; Eelyn Kok; Yao Wenlong
- Opening theme: 在一起 (Together) by 官镜瀚、洪家文、刘晋旭
- Ending theme: 1) 没有答案 (There is No Answer in Love) by 嚴爵; 2) 甜密密(Sweet )by 刘慧棋
- Country of origin: Singapore
- Original language: Chinese
- No. of episodes: 20

Production
- Executive producer: Soh Bee Lian 苏美莲
- Running time: approx. 45 minutes (exc. advertisements)

Original release
- Network: MediaCorp Channel 8
- Release: 8 January – 5 February 2014

Related
- The Journey: A Voyage; Soup of Life

Yes We Can! is a Mediacorp Channel 8 Chinese New Year drama. It stars Romeo Tan, Rebecca Lim, Xu Bin, Sora Ma, Chen Liping, Chen Hanwei, Eelyn Kok and Yao Wenlong as the main casts of the series.

== Cast ==
Cast	Role
Xu Bin	Li Yi 李毅
Sora Ma	Zhu Siyi 朱思仪
Rebecca Lim	Zhang Xueqin 张雪芹
Romeo Tan	Liu Junwei 刘骏卫
Chen Liping	Liu Cailing 刘彩玲
Chen Hanwei	Hong Qingshan 洪青山
Dennis Chew	Mr Chew
Chen Tianwen	Jiang Wen 江汶
Chen Shucheng	Zhu Haitao 朱海涛
Huang Shi Nan	Mr Feng 冯先生
Yao Wenlong	Li Xiaoyou 李小柚
Fang Rong	

== Awards and nominations ==
=== Star Awards 2015 ===
Yes We Can! is nominated in 5 categories. It Won 1 out of 5 awards, Best Actress.

Nominee / Work	Award	Accolade	Result
Ivan Goh Eu Jin	Best Costume & Image Design	Star Awards	Nominated
Rebecca Lim	Favourite Female Character	Star Awards	Nominated
Romeo Tan & Rebecca Lim	Favourite Onscreen Couple (Drama)	Star Awards	Nominated
Rebecca Lim	Best Actress	Star Awards	Won

== See also ==
- List of programmes broadcast by Mediacorp Channel 8
