= Star Awards for Rocket =

Singaporean media award (2010–2016)

Star Awards for Rocket 年度飞跃奖
- Awarded for: Most Improvement in the Performance in His/Her Respective Field of Profession
- Country: Singapore
- Presented by: Mediacorp
- First award: 2010
- Final award: 2016
- Currently held by: Vacant

The Star Awards for Rocket was an award presented annually from 2010 to 2016 at the Star Awards, where Mediacorp of Singapore recognises entertainers under their employment with awards for artistic and technical merit for outstanding performances of the year.

== History ==
The category was introduced in 2010, at the 16th Star Awards ceremony; Elvin Ng received the award for his performance in Together and it is given in honour of a Mediacorp artiste who have made most improvement in the performance of his/her respective field of profession for the past year. The nominees are determined by a team of judges employed by Mediacorp; winners are selected by a majority vote from the entire judging panel.

No nominees were announced for this category. However, in 2013, the nominees were revealed on Toggle Now minutes before the presentation of the award.

Since its inception, the award has been given to seven artistes. Julie Tan was the final winner in this category for her breakthrough performance in The Dream Makers II.

The award was discontinued since 2017.

== Recipients ==
Year	Artiste	Work title (role)	Nominees	Ref
2010	Elvin Ng	Together (as Huang Zhihao)	—N/a	
2011	Pornsak	Food Source	—N/a	
2012	Desmond Tan	A Song To Remember (as Luo Xiaoxiao)	—N/a	
2013	Romeo Tan	Joys of Life (as Qian Duo'er)	Ian Fang — Don't Stop Believin' (Bai Zhixiang 白志翔); Sora Ma — It's a Wonderful Life (Zhang Xixi 张细细); Julie Tan — It's a Wonderful Life (Hao Pingan 郝平安)	
2014	Priscelia Chan	—N/a	—N/a	
2015	Shaun Chen	The Journey: Tumultuous Times (as Zhang Jia/ Hu Jia)	—N/a	
2016	Julie Tan	The Dream Makers II (as Dong Zihuai)	—N/a	
