= The Journey: Tumultuous Times =

- Also known as: Tumultuous Times; The Journey 2 动荡的年代
- 信约:动荡的年代
- Genre: Period drama
- Written by: Ang Eng Tee 洪荣狄
- Directed by: Loo Yin Yam 卢燕金; Doreen Yap 叶佩娟; Su Miao Fang 苏妙芳 霍志楷
- Starring: Shaun Chen; Jeanette Aw; Andie Chen; Felicia Chin; Romeo Tan; Chen Hanwei
- Opening theme: 信约 by Kelvin Tan & Joi Chua
- Ending theme: 诀別书 by Jim Lim and The Freshman
- Country of origin: Singapore
- Original language: Chinese
- No. of episodes: 30 (list of episodes)

Production
- Producer: Chong Liung Man 张龙敏
- Running time: approx. 45 minutes (exc. advertisements)

Original release
- Network: MediaCorp Channel 8
- Release: 24 November 2014 – 2 January 2015

Related
- The Journey: A Voyage (2013); The Journey: Our Homeland (2015)

The Journey: Tumultuous Times (Chinese: 信约：动荡的年代, also known as Tumultuous Times) is a Chinese language period drama which aired on MediaCorp Channel 8. It is the second of The Journey trilogy which chronicles the history of Singapore through the eyes of immigrants during the pre-World War II era until contemporary times. It stars second generation casts of Shaun Chen, Jeanette Aw, Andie Chen, Felicia Chin, Romeo Tan, and Chen Hanwei as the main cast of the second instalment.

The Journey culminates in Singapore's nation building celebrations in 2015 with The Journey: Our Homeland, in time for Singapore's 50th National Day.

== Plot ==
The Journey: Tumultuous Times depicted the period of the Japanese occupation where the adversity only served to strengthen the characters' survival instinct. When the British colonialists returned, stirrings of dissent became more apparent about their right to rule. In this period of uncertainty, there were vastly different ideals about how independence could be achieved. Yet despite all odds, they pulled through and survived.

This is the story of five young people unraveled over a period of 20 years (1940–1965) spanning World War II and Independence. Major events that will happen in the drama include the Japanese occupation of Singapore, Hock Lee bus riots, student demonstrations, and social tensions.

In the wee hours of the morning on 8 December 1941, Japanese planes attacked Singapore by air under the cloak of the night. This is the beginning of the period of unrest in Singapore. During the Sook Ching, Zhang Tianying gets captured and is killed. Zhang Huiniang dies in her two children's arms after being brutally raped by the Kempeitai.

In 1954, nine years after the Japanese Surrender, Zhang Jia, now with the surname Hu, lives with his adoptive father, Hu Weiren. Zhang Min is living with her cousins, Zhang Yan, Hong Dangyong, Hong Minghui and their parents. Hu Jia has an obvious crush on Bai Lanxiang, also known as Sweet Soup Lass. Hu Jia has become a gang leader and is the heir to Liang Sihai's brand Siu Yee Tong, while another gang, The Seventh Gate of Loyalty sends a mole to join Hu Jia's gang.

The Hock Lee bus riots causes a series of other riots like the halting of education during the State of Emergency in Singapore. One of Zhang Min's students are killed in the ensuing protest. Hu Jia then finds out about his parents' horrible deaths, all caused by Weiren. He takes revenge by drowning Weiren to honour his parents.

Zhang Min is then imprisoned by Zhang Yan, who married Minghui. Zhang Yan believes that his brother-in-law is part of an underground gang of fugitives and orders Dangyong to be killed. Minghui overhears this, and files for a divorce. Sweet Soup Lass is then raped and killed after being kidnapped by the mole, Jaws. The Seventh Gate of Loyalty burns the hut where Sweet Soup Lass died. Hu Jia retrieves her body, barely surviving. He then slips into a bout of depression. Minghui tries to console him but to no avail.

Meanwhile, Zhang Yan gets addicted to his power and abuses it, getting drunk and finding a new woman, Fang Lulu. Someone tries to kill Zhang Yan but Minghui takes the bullet for him. She survives.

Dangyong tries to find Minghui at a hospital before being ambushed by Zhang Yan and his group. They run to a bridge before Zhang Yan shoots him, and Dangyong falls into a river. After reaching land, his comrade Ding Hao tries to betray him, but Hu Jia intervenes and takes care of Dangyong. Dangyong realises that his right hand has been crippled.

Zhang Min gets raped by Zhang Yan. She decides to cheapen herself so that Dangyong will survive. Dangyong saves a PTSD-stricken Zhang Min and they get married. Zhang Min then realises her brother is not dead and has been by her side this whole time. Hu Jia and Zhang Min reconcile. Meanwhile, Hu Jia manages to hunt down Jaws and kill him.

Zhang Yan, who tries to kill Dangyong himself accidentally causes the Bukit Ho Swee fire. 2000 families go homeless and Dangyong is blamed to be the arsonist. He goes to jail and studies law there. Then, Zhang Tianpeng (Li Nanxing) realises that Zhang Yan sold his company, Brothers' Balm 2 years ago and dies of a heart attack. Zhang Yan blames Lulu for instigating him to sell his company. Lulu is killed and Zhang Yan goes to jail in England. Hu Jia invites Minghui to dinner but gets stabbed by Bai Gou, the leader of the Seventh Gate of Loyalty. Hu Jia kills him and proposes to Minghui.

It is 1965. Independence arrives and the Zhang and Hong family start a new life...

== Cast ==
=== Main cast ===
- Shaun Chen as Hu Jia / Zhang Jia (胡佳 / 张佳)
  - Younger version portrayed by Damien Teo, Teenage version portrayed by Zong Zijie
- Jeanette Aw as Hong Minghui (洪明慧)
- Andie Chen as Hong Dangyong (洪当勇)
  - Younger version portrayed by Gary Tan
- Felicia Chin as Zhang Min (张敏)
  - Younger version portrayed by Lieu Yanxi
- Romeo Tan as Steven Chong
  - Younger version portrayed by Amos Lim
- Carrie Wong as Bai Lanxiang (白兰香)
  - Teenage version portrayed by Alicia Lo
- Chen Hanwei as Hu Weiren (胡为人)
- Allen Chen as Zhang Tianying (张天鹰)
- Joanne Peh as Zhang Huiniang (张蕙娘)
- Li Nanxing as Zhang Tianpeng (张天鹏)
- Chris Tong as Bai Mingzhu (白明珠)
- Desmond Tan as Hong Shi (洪石)
- Jeanette Aw as Lin Yazi (林鸭子)
- Ian Teng as Hong Kuan (洪宽)
- Louis Lim as Uncle Sweet Soup (糖水叔)
- Zheng Geping as Liang Sihai (梁四海)
- 陈翔 as Old Cai (老蔡)
- 陶樱 as Ling-jie (玲姐)
- Ernest Chong as Bullethead (弹子头)
- Zakk Lim as Cannon (大炮)
- Alan Yeo as Hei Gou/Black Dog (黑狗)
- Brandon Wong as Bai Gou/White Dog (白狗)
- 小孟 as Boar (山猪)
- Seth Ang as Jaws/Ironteeth (铁齿)
- James Fong as Ah Wei (阿威)
- Eric Lee as Chen Anguo (陈安国)
- Chia De Zhong as Pan Zhiming (潘志明)
- Jay Goh Jun Hui as Li Xiaowen (李小文)
- Tan Mei Kee as Lin Meiyan (林美燕)
- Zhu Xiufeng

=== Others ===
- 陈志强 as Uncle De (德叔)
- 廖永辉 as Japanese Officer (日军官)
- 许纾宁 as Yu Jie (玉洁)
- 郑文 as Luo Xin (罗新)
- Ray Nu D/O Su Wan as Siti (西蒂)
- 叶进华 as Subordinate Lim (林高官)
- 徐啸天 as Ding Hao (丁浩)
- 郑扬溢 as Xiao Fang (小方)
- 陈天赐 as Liu Qiang (刘强)
- Nic Lee as Xiao Gao (小高)
- 刘慧娴 as Fang Lulu (方露露)

== Production ==
The series is partly sponsored by the Media Development Authority of Singapore. Production began in June 2014.

Similar to its predecessor, The Journey: A Voyage, Tumultuous Times uses CGI in its production. The series is Channel 8's 2014 year-end blockbuster celebrating 51 years of television.

== Original soundtrack ==
There are three variations of the opening sequence (i.e. images of the theme song). The third opening sequence (episodes 25–30) uses the ending song, 《诀别书》, instead of the original theme song, 《信。约》, unlike the first two opening sequences, used between episodes 1-4 and episodes 5-24 respectively.

Song title	Performer
"信。约"	Kelvin Tan and Joi Chua
"诀別书"	Jim Lim and The Freshman

== Other media ==
This series was adapted as a comic and has been selling at Popular Bookstores since November 2015, targeted at upper primary and secondary students. The comic showcases the best of the series, and is promoted by the Committee to Promote Chinese Language.

== Accolades ==
Tumultuous Times garnered 19 nominations in 16 awards, the most nominations for a drama in Star Awards 2015, and won nine, which include Best Drama Serial. It also garnered two nominations in 10th Seoul International Drama Awards under the Best Drama Series and Best Director categories.

Organisation	Year	Category	Nominees	Result	Ref
Star Awards	2015	Young Talent Award	Damien Teo	Won	
Star Awards	2015	Young Talent Award	Gary Tan	Nominated	
Star Awards	2015	Best Theme Song	《信。约》 by Joi Chua and Kelvin Tan	Won	
Star Awards	2015	Best Director	Doreen Yap Pei Kiang	Nominated	
Star Awards	2015	Best Director	Loo Yin Kam	Nominated	
Star Awards	2015	Best Screenplay	Ang Eng Tee	Nominated	
Star Awards	2015	Best Costume and Image Design	Xu Ying Ying	Nominated	
Star Awards	2015	Best Cameraman for Drama Programme	Steve Wong	Nominated	
Star Awards	2015	Best Music and Sound Design	Gao Jun Wei and Zheng Kai Hua	Nominated	
Star Awards	2015	Favourite Male Character	Romeo Tan	Nominated	
Star Awards	2015	Favourite Female Character	Jeanette Aw	Won	
Star Awards	2015	Rocket Award	Shaun Chen	Won	
Star Awards	2015	Best Drama Serial	—N/a	Won	
Star Awards	2015	Best Actor	Shaun Chen	Won	
Star Awards	2015	Best Actress	Felicia Chin	Nominated	
Star Awards	2015	Best Supporting Actor	Chen Hanwei	Won	
Star Awards	2015	Best Supporting Actress	Carrie Wong	Nominated	
Star Awards	2015	Best Supporting Actress	Joanne Peh	Won	
Asian Television Awards	2015	Best Drama Serial	—N/a	Won	
Asian Television Awards	2015	Best Actor in a Leading Role	Chen Hanwei	Nominated	
Asian Television Awards	2015	Best Drama Serial	—N/a	Won	
10th Seoul International Drama Awards	2015	Best Drama Serial	—N/a	Nominated	
10th Seoul International Drama Awards	2015	Best Director	Loo Yin Kam	Nominated	

Preceded by The Dream Makers (season 1); 2013-14	Star Awards for Best Drama Serial; The Journey: Tumultuous Times; 2014-15	Succeeded by The Dream Makers (season 2); 2015-16
