= Hello Singapore =

Singaporean television news program

- Chinese: 狮城有约
- Genre: News; Current affairs Info-ed
- Presented by: Chua Qin Kai; Soh Bee Lan; Lim Pei Fen; Vincent Lim
- Country of origin: Singapore
- Original language: Mandarin

Production
- Production locations: Mediacorp Campus; 1 Stars Avenue, Singapore 138507
- Running time: 60 minutes (with advertisements); 30 minutes (Talk of the Town highlight segment)
- Production company: Mediacorp

Original release
- Network: Mediacorp Channel 8
- Release: 20 October 2014 – present

Related
- Channel 8 News

Hello Singapore (Chinese: 狮城有约) is a news/current affairs programme produced by Mediacorp Channel 8.

The show replaced the current weekday broadcast of Singapore Today as well as half of the 7.00pm drama timeslot, airing weekdays from 6.30pm, premiering together with half-hour drama programme from China & Singapore.

Till 7 February 2025, a repeat telecast of "Crosstalks" and the topic of the day will also be available the next weekday, 7.30am to 8.00am.

Hello Singapore ended its broadcast at Caldecott Hill on 10 March 2017. On 13 March 2017, it was then moved to Mediacorp Campus at 1 Stars Avenue.

The show went through a revamp from 10 February 2025, with a new second segment aired at 7pm "Talk of the Town" (狮城热话). The talkshow segment has also been reduced from 2 to 1 presenters. A repeat telecast of this segment will also be available on the next weekday, 9.00am to 9.30am starting 21 July 2025, taking over Morning Express.

== Presenters ==
=== Current Affairs Presenters (狮城热话) ===
- 蔡沁凯 Chua Qin Kai
- 苏美兰 Soh Bee Lan
- 林佩芬 Christina Lim Pei Fen
- 林良泉 Vincent Lim

=== News Presenters (新闻時段) ===
- 林启元 Lin Chi Yuan (also concurrent serving as presenter for News 8 At One 一点新闻)
- 赵文蓓 Zhao Wenbei
- 王征 Wang Zheng
- 陈沁霖 Tan Qin Lin
- 林良泉 Vincent Lim (also concurrent serving as presenter for Hello Singapore 狮城热话)
- 杨振华 Yang Zheng Hua (also concurrent serving as presenter for News 8 At One 一点新闻)

== Former Presenters ==
- 江坚文 Kenneth Kong - Went over to Love 97.2FM in Mar 2016.
- 琪琪 Lim Yi Chyi (Qiqi) - Went over to Capital 95.8FM in Sep 2017.
- 郭亮 Guo Liang - Left in Jun 2020 to focus on acting and variety shows. Went over to Love 97.2FM in 2022.
- 刘俊葳 Jeffrey Low - Left in Feb 2025 due to show revamp. Eventually left 8 World in mid 2026.
- 林有懿 Lin Youyi - Formally serving as a part time presenter with 狮城有约. Left in Feb 2025 due to show revamp.
- Evelyn Lam 蓝丽婷 - Left 8 World in October 2025.

== See also ==
- Channel 8 (Singaporean TV channel)
- 8world
