= Provision Shop =

2016 film by Royston Tan

- 杂货店
- Directed by: Royston Tan
- Starring: Sora Ma; Marcus Chin; Li Yinzhu; Siti Khadijah; Brandon Wong; Cui Yang; Aden Tan; Sarah Daniel
- Opening theme: 有空记得约我
- Composer: The Freshman 插班生
- Country of origin: Singapore
- Original languages: Mandarin; English

Production
- Running time: 45 minutes
- Production companies: Tribal Worldwide Singapore; Ministry of Communications and Information

Original release
- Network: Mediacorp Channel 8
- Release: 17 July 2016

Provision Shop (Chinese: 杂货店) is a Singaporean telemovie commissioned by the Ministry of Communications and Information in collaboration with Tribal Worldwide Singapore. It is directed by Royston Tan and stars Sora Ma, Marcus Chin, Li Yinzhu, Siti Khadijah, Brandon Wong, Cui Yang, Aden Tan and Sarah Daniel. The telemovie debuted on television on 17 July 2016 on Mediacorp Channel 8.

== Plot ==
The film consists of four stories involving shop owner, his daughter, an ice delivery man and a maid.

== Cast ==
- Sora Ma as Gao Ling Ling, the provision shop owner's daughter
- Marcus Chin as the provision shop owner
- Li Yinzhu as Madam Goh, also nicknamed "Empress Wu"
- Siti Khadijah as Theresita, Madam Goh's helper
- Brandon Wong as an ice-delivery man
- Cui Yang as the ice-delivery man's supervisor from China
- Aden Tan as Peter, a tertiary student who is a frequent patron of the provision shop
- Sarah Daniel as a tertiary student in a budding romance with Peter

== Production ==
The film was done with collaboration with Tribal Worldwide Singapore and the Ministry of Communications and Information. Tan said it was inspired by Tee Seng Store and the shopowner’s experiences in managing changes over time. The film also explored how people are affected by evolving times and adapting to changes.

== Reception ==
Prime Minister of Singapore Lee Hsien Loong praised the soundtrack of the telemovie and had listened to the full soundtrack twice.
