= Thomas Ong =

Singaporean actor

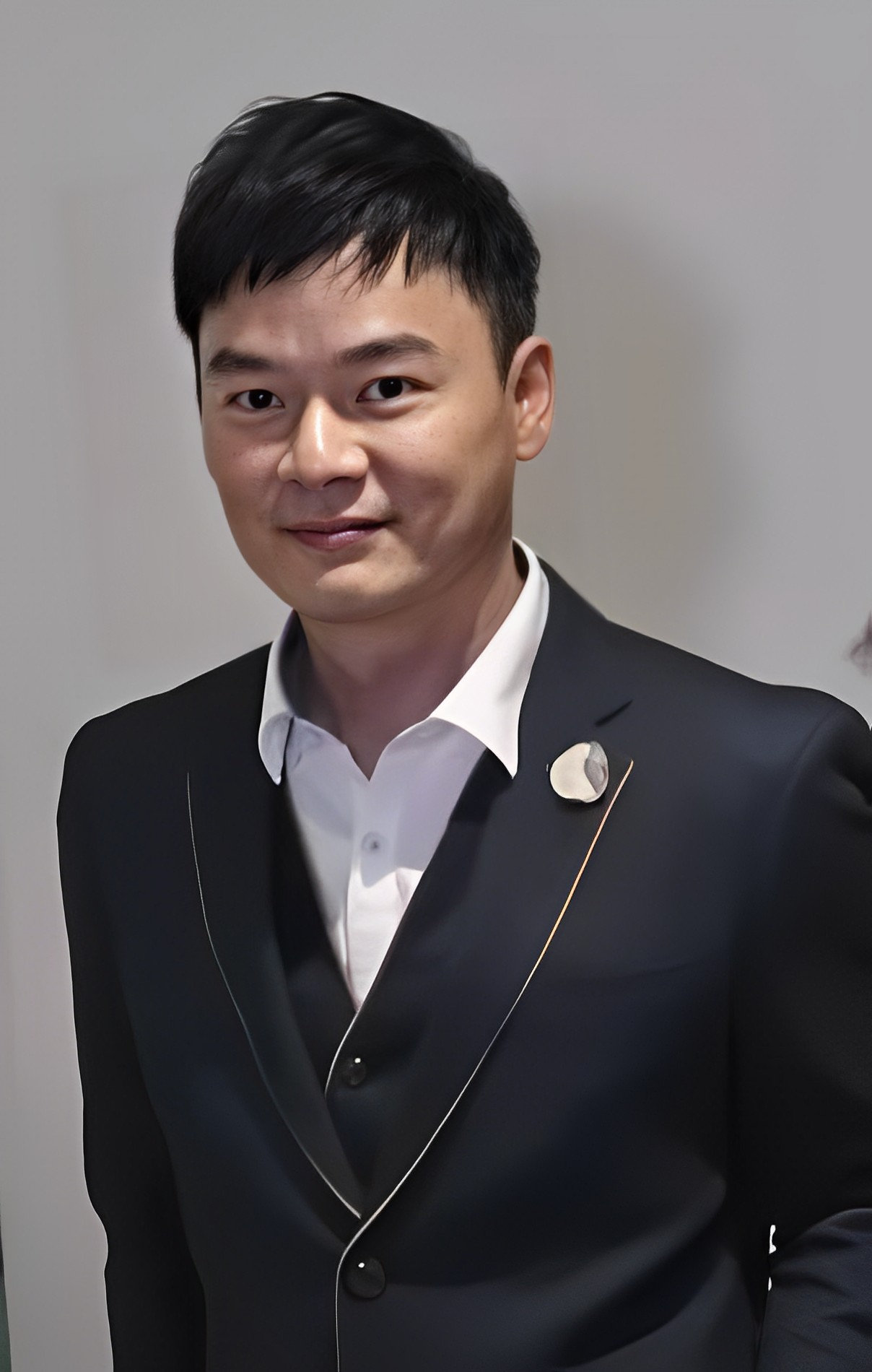
- Ong at the Star Awards 2017
- Born: 1 February 1969 (age 57); Singapore
- Education: Ngee Ann Polytechnic
- Occupations: Actor; television host; businessman; former flight steward
- Years active: 1994−present

Chinese name
- Chinese: 王沺裁
- Hanyu Pinyin: Wáng Tiáncái

Thomas Ong Thian Chai (born 1 February 1969) is a Singaporean actor, television host and businessman.

== Career ==
Ong was a flight steward with Singapore Airlines before entering the entertainment industry. He was spotted while doing modelling and was invited to join Television Corporation of Singapore (TCS) in 1994. Immediately, he was offered the lead role and made his debut in Dr Justice. He won the Top 5 and Top 10 Most Popular Male Artistes award thrice in the 1990s.

In April 1997, Ong left TCS at the end of his three years contract.

He left and returned to MediaCorp several times to concentrate on other projects. More recently he returned to MediaCorp for the fourth time and signed a three-year contract in early 2012.

In January 2020, Ong announced his retirement from the entertainment industry.

== Filmography ==
| Year | Title | Role | Notes | Ref |
|---|---|---|---|---|
| 1994 | Dr Justice 法医故事 之《红颜裁决》 | Police Officer Ye 叶警官 | | |
| 1994 | Love at Last 真心男儿 | Huang Jiawei 黄家伟 | | |
| 1995 | Strange Encounters III 奇缘III 之《灶神》 | Gu Canglong 谷苍龙 | | |
| 1995 | The Dragons Five 飞龙五将 | Zhao Tianbao 赵天豹 | | |
| 1995 | The Last Rhythm 曲终魂断 | Li Yisheng 李怡生 | | |
| 1996 | Waves of Courage 逐浪青春 | Zhao Wei 赵威 | | |
| 1996 | Wild Orchids 再见萤光兰 | Zhu Ziqing 朱子青 | | |
| 1996 | The Unbroken Cycle | Zhang Hai 张海 / Zhou Xinghuan 周星寰 | | |
| 1996 | Full House 不速之客 | Guo Jiaping 郭家平 | Telemovie | |
| 1997 | Living By Night 都是夜归人 | Shen Shaotang 沈绍棠 | | |
| 1997 | Love in a Foreign City 富贵双城 | Yu Guotian 余国添 | | |
| 1999 | Are You My Brother? 错体双宝 | Chang Le 常乐 | | |
| 1999 | Coup de Scorpion 天蝎行动 | Wang Chong Guang 王重光 | | |
| 2000 | Master Swordsman Lu Xiaofeng | Hua Manlou 花满楼 | | |
| 2004 | Oh Dad! 偶像爸爸 | Li Weimin 李为民 | | |
| 2005 | Beautiful Illusions | Zhou Jiansheng 周健生 | | |
| 2005 | Love Concierge 爱的掌门人 | Qian Jiekuan 钱杰宽 | | |
| 2006 | Family Matters | Gao Ming 高明 | | |
| 2007 | Metamorphosis | Hu Xicun 胡希存 | | |
| 2008 | Our Rice House | Fan Yihang 范一航 | | |
| 2008 | Perfect Cut | Dr. Alex Tan 陈毅杰 | | |
| 2009 | Perfect Cut 2 | Dr. Alex Tan 陈毅杰 | | |
| 2010 | The Illusionist 魔幻視界 | James Lee 李世彦 | | |
| 2011 | Secrets for Sale | Stanley Chen 陈亮安 | | |
| 2011 | Bountiful Blessings | Tong Dafeng 童大风 | | |
| 2012 | Pillow Talk | Zhang Qiuyu 张秋宇 | | |
| 2013 | C.L.I.F. 2 | Zhou Zhiheng 周志恆 | | |
| 2013 | Marry Me 我要嫁出去 | Bill | | |
| 2014 | The Caregivers | Yang Haotian 杨浩天 | | |
| 2014 | Entangled 日落洞 | Yu Guangwei 于光威 | | |
| 2014 | Three Wishes | Zhao Yaozong 赵耀宗 | | |
| 2016 | House of Fortune | Qian Renjie 钱仁杰 | | |
| 2016 | Fire Up | Zhuang Yingxiong 庄英雄 | | |
| 2016 | You Can Be An Angel 2 | Lin Bin 林彬 | | |
| 2017 | Three Little Wishes | Zhao Yaozong 赵耀宗 | | |
| 2017 | Mightiest Mother-in-Law | Qi Hongzhe 齐宏哲 | | |
| 2017 | Life Less Ordinary | Qi Hongzhe 齐宏哲 | Cameo | |
| 2018 | You Can Be An Angel 3 你也可以是天使3 | Lin Bin 林彬 | Cameo | |
| 2018 | 29th February 229明天见 | Ye Zhengfang 叶正方 | | |
| 2018–2022 | Kin | Steven Loh | | |
| 2020 | Super Dad 男神不败 | Xu Wei Hao 许伟豪 | | |
| 2025 | I Believe I Can Fly 青春小鸟 | Wang Shuntian 王顺天 | | |

== Awards and nominations ==
| Organisation | Year | Award | Nominated works | Result | Ref |
|---|---|---|---|---|---|
| Star Awards | 1995 | Best Newcomer | Love at Last | Nominated | |
| Star Awards | 1995 | Top 10 Most Popular Male Artistes | —N/a | Won | |
| Star Awards | 1996 | Top 10 Most Popular Male Artistes | —N/a | Won | |
| Star Awards | 1999 | Top 10 Most Popular Male Artistes | —N/a | Won | |
| Star Awards | 2010 | Favourite Male Character | Perfect Cut 2 (as Alex Tan) | Nominated | |
| Star Awards | 2013 | Best Actor | Pillow Talk (as Zhang Qiuyu) | Nominated | |
| Star Awards | 2013 | Top 10 Most Popular Male Artistes | —N/a | Nominated | |
| Star Awards | 2015 | Best Actor | Three Wishes (as Zhao Yaozong) | Nominated | |
| Star Awards | 2015 | Top 10 Most Popular Male Artistes | —N/a | Nominated | |
| Star Awards | 2016 | Top 10 Most Popular Male Artistes | —N/a | Nominated | |
| Star Awards | 2017 | Top 10 Most Popular Male Artistes | —N/a | Nominated | |
| Star Awards | 2018 | Top 10 Most Popular Male Artistes | —N/a | Won | |
