= Our Rice House =

- 我们的饭店
- Genre: Modern Drama
- Starring: Thomas Ong; Cavin Soh; Aileen Tan; Michelle Chong
- Country of origin: Singapore
- Original language: Chinese
- No. of episodes: 8

Production
- Running time: approx. 45 minutes

Original release
- Network: MediaCorp
- Release: 4 February – 24 March 2008

Our Rice House (Chinese: 我们的饭店) is a modern Singaporean Chinese 8 episode family drama which is telecast on Singapore's free-to-air channel, MediaCorp TV Channel 8. It made its debut on 4 February 2008.

== Cast ==
=== Main cast ===
- Thomas Ong as Da Fan
- Cavin Soh as Xiao Fan
- Aileen Tan as Li Ying
- Michelle Chong as Ting Ting

=== Supporting cast ===
- Chen Guohua as An Ge
- Michelle Tay as Sally
- Pan Hongjin as Ma La Ji

== Viewership ratings ==
Week	Episode	Date	Percentage of population (Round off to nearest 0.1%)
Week 1	Episode 1	4 February 2008	11.8%
Week 2	Episode 2	11 February 2008	12%
