= C.L.I.F. 2 =

Singaporean television series

- 警徽天职2
- Genre: Police procedural
- Created by: Phang Kai Yee
- Written by: Seah Choon Guan; Tang Yeow
- Directed by: Chen Yi You; Foo Seng Peng; Jasmine Woo
- Starring: Li Nanxing; Qi Yuwu; Rui En; Joanne Peh; Thomas Ong
- Opening theme: 光荣角色 by Power Station
- Country of origin: Singapore
- Original languages: Chinese, with some English dialogue
- No. of episodes: 20

Production
- Producer: Chia Mien Yang
- Running time: approx. 45 minutes

Original release
- Network: Mediacorp Channel 8
- Release: 18 February – 15 March 2013

Related
- C.L.I.F. (2011); C.L.I.F. 3 (2014); C.L.I.F. 4 (2016); C.L.I.F. 5 (2019); Unriddle (2010); Unriddle 2 (2012); Patrol (1989); Beyond the Axis of Truth (2001); True Heroes (2003); The Crime Hunters (2004); Zero to Hero (2005); The Undisclosed (2006); C.I.D. (2006); Metamorphosis (2007); Crime Busters x 2 (2008)

C.L.I.F. 2
- Traditional Chinese: 警徽天職2
- Simplified Chinese: 警徽天职2
Transcriptions
Standard Mandarin
- Hanyu Pinyin: Jǐng Huī Tiān Zhí 2

C.L.I.F. 2 (Courage, Loyalty, Integrity, Fairness, or 警徽天职2) was a police procedural series produced by MediaCorp Singapore in 2012 in collaboration with the Singapore Police Force. It was broadcast from 18 February to 15 March 2013 on free-to-air MediaCorp Channel 8 and consists of 20 episodes. The series is co-sponsored by Gain City, Sheng Siong Supermarkets, and Gold Roast Coffee. It stars Li Nanxing, Qi Yuwu, Rui En, Joanne Peh, and Thomas Ong for the second installment of the series.

The series is the highest-rated drama serial in 2013, with an average viewership of 901,000, beating the record set by It's a Wonderful Life (with 835,000).

== Plot ==
The series continues from where C.L.I.F. left off with new cases and new cast members. Yew Jia (Qi Yuwu) is now a Senior Investigating Officer and has begun a relationship with Xin Yi (Joanne Peh), who had partnered with him in the CID on a temporary transfer. Former uniformed officer Kok Hung (Andie Chen) was recently transferred to the Special Investigations Section in the CID. Seetoh Yan (Aileen Tan) remains in charge but is assigned as Head Investigation Officer as well.

Yew Jia is assigned a new partner Jimmy (Cavin Soh), a veteran policeman, and their friendship begins awkwardly when Jimmy accidentally mistook Yew Jia for a molester and "arrests" him. Kok Hung's follow-the-book approach does not bode well with his partners as he has to learn to adjust to a different way of approaching cases than he was used to during his days on uniformed patrol at a NPC. His superior is Tze Keat (Rui En), a headstrong career woman who has yet to find her other half. When her long-time colleague and forensics expert Lim Thiam (Li Nanxing) challenges her to meet someone through a speed-dating event, not wanting to lose the wager, she accepts. Xin Yi's dream comes true when she earns a transfer to the CID and assigned to the Serious Sexual Crimes Branch. She meets the resident medical examiner Dr Chow (Thomas Ong) and becomes torn between him and Yew Jia.

The officers from the different branches at Tanglin Police Division work together to tackle all sorts of cases ranging from misdemeanours such as theft to more major cases such as violent crime, elaborate scams and prostitution. Unfortunately for some, their personal lives interfere with their jobs and they are forced to make difficult decisions. Kok Hung is grief-stricken when his fiancée is murdered and struggles to keep his emotions in check. Seetoh Yan gets a shock of her life when her usually mild-mannered son becomes a suspect in separate rape and assault cases. Xin Yi becomes worried her sister Jen is hanging out with the wrong crowd when Jen becomes a suspect in one of Yew Jia's cases. Keat's memory of her own sister's disappearance and murder returns to haunt her during a series of kidnapping-cum-murder investigations and the similarities in modus operandi leads her to suspect the same perpetrator has returned. Meanwhile, a dashing young psychologist Chan Yin Kwun (Pierre Png) Tze Keat and Lum Thiam befriend is not all he seems.

== Cast ==
The characters names are in both Chinese and dialect (if any) romanization.

=== Main cast ===
Cast	Role	Description
Li Nanxing	Wee Lum Thiam (魏蓝天)	ASP Wee Lum Thiam; Head of Forensic Management Branch (FMB); Zhijie's boyfriend In love with Zhijie and married her in the end
Qi Yuwu	Tang Yewjia (唐耀佳)	SSI Tang Yew Jia; Senior Investigating Officer in the Tanglin PD; Xinyi's ex-boyfriend
Joanne Peh	Leow Xinyi (廖心怡)	ASP Leow Xin Yi; Ajumma, Agashi, Dumbo (小飞象), Swallow (小飞燕); CID officer in the Serious Sexual Crime Branch; Yaojia's ex-girlfriend Went for the UN Peace Keeping tour in the end
Rui En	Ng Tze Keat (黄芷婕)	SSI Ng Tze Keat; Officer-in-charge Team C of Special Investigation Section (SIS); Yanjun's ex-girlfriend Lantian's girlfriend In love with Lantian and married him in the end Younger version portrayed by 谢凯欣
Andie Chen	Chao Kok Hung (赵国煌)	SSI Chao Kok Hung; Deputy Officer-in-charge Team C (SIS)
Pierre Png	Chan Yin Kwun (陈彦均)	Main Villain; Psychiatrist, Serial kidnapper-cum-murderer; pedophile
Thomas Ong	Chow Chee Heng (周志恆)	Dr Chow Chee Heng; Ajeossi; HSA Forensic pathologist Student care centre volunteer and tennis coach Carries a torch for Xinyi
Aileen Tan	Seetoh Yan (司徒燕)	Supt Seetoh Yan; Head Investigation Officer of Tanglin PD
Cavin Soh	Tai Da Tung (戴大东)	SI Jimmy Tai; Uncle Jimmy; Senior Investigation Officer in Tanglin PD; Yaojia's partner

=== Supporting police cast ===
Cast	Role	Description
Hu Wensui	Koh How Peng (许浩平)	SSI Koh How Peng; Member of Team C (SIS)
Haden Hee	Tay Jin Qiang (郑进强)	SSI Tay Jin Qiang; Member of Team C (SIS)
Jessica Ang	Nico	Member of Team C (SIS)
杨建忠	Eric	Member of Team C (SIS)
谢镇耀	Kenny	Member of Team C (SIS)
陈喜强	Ng Saik Hua (黄锡华)	Supt Ng Saik Hua
蔡龙	Lau Yongzheng (刘勇正)	Commander of STAR
Joy Yak	Bai Yuxia (白玉霞)	Senior Investigating Officer in the Tanglin PD
萧万筌	Ouyang Rong (欧阳荣)	Member of Tanglin PD
陈皆燊	Jason	Member of Tanglin PD
Silver Ang	Sim Wen Lin (沈文霖)	Member of the FMB Sim Wen Lin; Laboratory technician
戴语成	Denzyl	Member of the FMB
Lim Chai Teck	Chai Teck	Member of the FMB
William Lawandi	Ye Rongguang (叶荣光)	
陈秋宁	Joe-Lin	Member of the FMB Joe Lin Tan
許永春	Yongchun (永春)	
莊德良	Yixiang (毅翔)	Member of Tanglin PD
张龙盛	Haowen (浩文)	Member of Tanglin PD
卓峻陞	Weijian (伟健)	Member of Tanglin PD
刘金水	Hongting (鸿廷)	Member of Tanglin PD
Michael Kwah	Xie Haoxiong (谢豪雄)	Member of Tanglin PD
白馨妮	Stella	

=== Other cast ===
Cast	Role	Description
Sheila Tan	Jess	Jess Ho Man Hwa (何曼华); Jay's ex-girlfriend who dumped him for another boyfriend
陈勇铭	Jay	SAF regular Jay Tan Lai Kit (陈来吉); Jess's ex-boyfriend Comes from a single-parent family Won Best Soldier award Has a violent streak Took Ng Tze Keat and six others hostage in a fashion outlet Killed by STAR when he was about to kill Tze Keat
Yap Huixin	Coco	Chow Chee Heng's student at the care centre 356's triad member Daxiong, Ivan, Jeffery and Jiang Yongzhe's friend Raped and kidnapped by Max in episode 10; Witnessed Chan Yin Kwun calling to Stanley at Red Dragon KTV in episode 15
Ivan Tan	Daxiong (大雄)	Chow Chee Heng's student at the care centre 356's triad member Coco, Ivan, Jeffery and Jiang Yongzhe's friend
郑国华	Ivan	Chow Chee Heng's student at the care centre Jiang Yongzhe's friend 356's triad member Coco, Daxiong, Jeffery and Jiang Yongzhe's friend
Scott C. Hillyard	Jeffery	Chow Chee Heng's student at the care centre 356's triad member Coco, Daxiong, Ivan and Jiang Yongzhe's friend
Zhang Xinxiang	Lau Zhen Wei (刘震伟)	Businessman/Taxi driver Lau Zhen Wei; Chen Yuqi's husband Lau Yun En's father Sng Xiuqing's client Had a one-night stand with Sng Xiuqing; Involved in Sng Xiuqing's homicide case Cleared of suspicions as he was found beating the red light at a Chai Chee Street junction when Sng Xiuqing was at a Bukit Timah petrol station Went gambling and borrowed money from loansharks after being sacked Died after being robbed and stabbed by Koh Keng Meng
Janice Koh	Chen Yuqi (陈玉琪)	Housewife; Wee Lum Thiam's ex-wife Lau Zhenwei's wife Lau Yun En's mother Suspect in murder of Lau Zhenwei; Diagnosed with severe depression in episode 14; Member of the support group
郭佩佩	Sng Xiuqing (孙秀青)	Property agent/investment consultant Cindy Sng Xiu Qing; Body found decomposed during the "Double Jeopardy" raid conducted by the Tanglin Police Division in episodes 1 and 2 Had a one-night stand with Lau Zhenwei; Murdered by Ou Weiren after she found out about his affair
苏仪珍	Elsie Tan	Sng Xiuqing's client Ou Weiren's girlfriend (Arrested - episode 3)
Seth Ang	Ou Weiren (欧威仁)	Elsie Tan's boyfriend Murdered Sng Xiuqing after she found out about his affair
Melody Low	Liu Sini (柳思倪)	Wu Keqiang's girlfriend Sexually assaulted by Fan Jianming; Broke up with Wu Keqiang in episode 7
叶兰	Iris Ho	Sexually assaulted by Fan Jianming
罗超伟	Fan Jianming (范建明)	Sexually assaulted females, including Iris Ho and Liu Sini (Arrested - episode 5)
Aloysius Pang	Jiang Yongzhe (江永哲)	Situ Yan's son 356's triad member Coco, Daxiong, Ivan and Jeffrey's friend Went into hiding after "raping" Coco; Turned himself in to the police in episode 10; Arrested in relation to Don's attack in episode 11; Sentenced to 18 months' imprisonment (Jailed - episode 14)
Louis C. Hillyard	Choo Boon Onn (朱文安)	Student Choo Boon Onn; B.O. Choo; Molester; Suffers from body odour (Released on bail - episode 6)
Candyce Toh	Qiu Ailin (邱艾琳)	Chao Kok Hung's fiancée Murdered by Sun Han after her tussle with Xiao Jiahao (Deceased - episode 6)
Xavier Ong	Xiao Jiahao (萧家豪)	Ex-convict, suspect in murder of Qiu Ailin; Xiao Jiafu's younger brother Cleared of suspicions due to his timidness
洪炳洲	Sun Han (孙汉)	Toa Payoh serial attacker Attacked females of Shen Xinhong's appearance (short hair and striped shirt), including Qiu Ailin and Miss Lin (Hospitalized - episode 9)
Jayley Woo	Leow Zhenting (廖贞婷)	Jen Leow; Leow Xinyi's paternal half-sister Shane's ex-girlfriend Sentenced to 24 months' probation and 120 hours of community service in episode 18
周叙丰	Don	Ong Soon Tong's triad member Attacked by Max and Yongzhe from 356 in episode 9
Ryan Lian	Max	356's chief Ong Soon Tong's rival Framed Jiang Yongzhe for "raping" Coco, and later kidnapped her (Arrested - episode 10)
姜帅	Shen Xinhong (沈馨红)	Abused Sun Han; Huang Huaxiong's travel agency's ex-employee
陈志强	Ah Xiang (阿祥)	Loanshark runner for Max who used to do a second-hand phone business
陈祥荣	Kelvin	Involved in illegal moneylending activities Monica's brother Tried to flee to Indonesia with Monica but is stopped in the nick of time (Arrested - episode 11)
Vincent Tee	Yang Longsan (杨龙三)	Involved in illegal moneylending activities (Arrested - episode 11)
Elizabeth Seah	Monica	Yang Longsan's helper Kelvin's sister Involved in illegal moneylending activities Tried to flee to Indonesia with Kelvin but is stopped in the nick of time (Arrested - episode 11)
Louis Lim Yongkun	Wang Baoguang (王宝光)	Smoker; Taxi robber, suspect in theft of three taxi robberies (Arrested - episode 12)
Remus Teng	Koh Keng Meng (高景明)	Smoker; Robbed and stabbed Lau Zhenwei in the taxi (Arrested - episode 13)
Jerry Manuel Koedding	Stanley Erickson	Yin Kwun's client Died after falling down the building by Zheng Liansong (Deceased - episode 15)
Shane Pow	Shane Loh (罗俊贤)	Drug peddler and harasser Jen's ex-boyfriend Tracy, Stacy and Cassie's boyfriend Matthew's brother Accused Tang Yewjia for getting into a fight with him and Jen to nearly fall off the block, when it should have been the other way round Tried to take Jen away with Matthew after she reported him to the police (Arrested - episode 17)
Tay Yong Meng	Sunny	Molested five females at the park, including Jen (Arrested - episode 14)
翁桧菁	Shuping (舒萍)	Beer lady Zheng Liansong's wife Stanley's girlfriend
徐啸天	Zheng Liansong (郑连松)	Shuping's husband Works at a nursery Murdered Stanley under Chan Yin Kwun's orders Owes loansharks a huge debt (Arrested - episode 16)
谢淑敏	Chow Xiaoru (周晓茹)	Primary school student Chow Xiao Ru; Chow Ming Chong's daughter (mother deceased); Liked "Nini The Cat"; Killed by Chan Yin Kwun after he took her to a warehouse (Deceased - episode 18)
Andi Lim	Goh Anxing (吴安兴)	Goh An Xing; Ex-convict, works at a horse stable Caused the death of Huang Zhiqing; Chan Yin Kwun's patient Killed by Chan Yin Kwun when he found out Yanjun used the same modus operandi to kidnap Chow Xiaoru (Deceased - episode 18)
施香君	Young Ng Tze Qing (小芷晴)	Primary school student Ng Tze Qing; Ng Tze Keat's elder sister Ng Huaxiong and Lin Limei's elder daughter Taken by Wu Anxing while playing hide-and-seek with Zhijie, and is killed (Deceased - 22 years ago)
吴伟杰	Chow Ming Chong (周铭中)	Chow Xiaoru's father Wee Lum Thiam's university classmate Member of the support group

=== Cameo appearances ===
Cast	Role	Description
Tan Tiow Im	Leow Xianchang (廖显昌)	Leow Xinyi and Jen's grandfather Wang Xiuling's husband
Ang Twa Bak	Wang Xiuling (汪秀玲)	Leow Xinyi and Jen's grandmother Liao Xianchang's wife
Tony Kim Ju Gong	Ng Huaxiong (黃华雄)	Ng Tze Qing and Ng Tze Keat's father Runs a travel agency Country club member Lin Limei's husband
Zhu Yuye	Lin Limei (林丽美)	Ng Tze Qing and Ng Tze Keat's mother Runs a travel agency Country club member Huang Huaxiong's wife
Chloe Ng Ying En	Lau Yun En (刘云恩)	Lau Zhenwei and Chen Yuqi's daughter Diagnosed with meningitis in episode 9
Ben Yeo	Wu Keqiang (吴克强)	Leow Xinyi's old classmate Liu Sini's boyfriend Hospitalized after drink-driving when Sini broke up with him Let go of his relationship with Sini and found a new girlfriend in the end
Shanice Koh	Jiang Yongxin (江永馨)	Jiang Desheng and Situ Yan's daughter
Tommy Wong	Jiang Desheng (江德盛)	Situ Yan's husband Jiang Yongzhe and Jiang Yongxin's father
温丽玲	Zhang Ruihua (章瑞桦)	Jimmy's wife Donghua's mother
Lorraine Koh	Tai Tunghua (戴东桦)	Jimmy and Zhang Ruihua's daughter Diagnosed with autism Drugged with ecstasy pills by Shane in episode 15; Kidnapped by Chan Yin Kwun in episode 19; Rescued by Jimmy, Xinyi and Yewjia in the end
Benjamin Heng	Tang Yaocheng (唐耀成)	Yewjia's older brother Diagnosed with spinocerebellar atrophy
Henry Heng	Yin Kwun's father (彦均父)	Chan Yanjun's father
林倩如	Yin Kwun's mother (彦均母)	Chan Yin Kwun's mother

== Episodes ==
No. overall	No. in season	Title	Original release date	Repeat telecast
21	1	"Episode 1"	February 18, 2013	June 28, 2016 PG
22	2	"Episode 2"	February 19, 2013	June 29, 2016 PG
23	3	"Episode 3"	February 20, 2013	June 30, 2016 PG
24	4	"Episode 4"	February 21, 2013	July 1, 2016 PG Some Violence
25	5	"Episode 5"	February 22, 2013	July 4, 2016 PG
26	6	"Episode 6"	February 25, 2013	July 5, 2016 PG
27	7	"Episode 7"	February 26, 2013	July 6, 2016 PG
28	8	"Episode 8"	February 27, 2013	July 7, 2016 PG
29	9	"Episode 9"	February 27, 2013	July 8, 2016 PG Some Violence
30	10	"Episode 10"	February 28, 2013	July 11, 2016 PG Junevile Delinquency
31	11	"Episode 11"	March 4, 2013	July 12, 2016 PG Some Sexual References
32	12	"Episode 12"	March 5, 2013	July 13, 2016 PG
33	13	"Episode 13"	March 6, 2013	July 14, 2016 PG
34	14	"Episode 14"	March 7, 2013	July 15, 2016 PG Some Violence
35	15	"Episode 15"	March 8, 2013	July 18, 2016 PG Some Violence
36	16	"Episode 16"	March 11, 2013	July 19, 2016 PG
37	17	"Episode 17"	March 12, 2013	July 20, 2016 PG
38	18	"Episode 18"	March 13, 2013	July 21, 2016 PG
39	19	"Episode 19"	March 14, 2013	July 22, 2016 PG
40	20	"Episode 20 (Season finale)"	March 15, 2013	July 25, 2016 PG Some Violence

== Accolades ==
Year	Award	Category	Nominees	Result	Ref
2014	Star Awards	Best Screenplay	Seah Choon Guan and Tang Yeow	Nominated	
2014	Star Awards	Favourite Onscreen Couple	Li Nanxing and Rui En	Nominated	
2014	Star Awards	Top Rated Drama Serial 2013	—N/a	Won	
2014	Star Awards	Best Supporting Actress	Aileen Tan	Nominated	
2014	Star Awards	Best Drama Serial	—N/a	Nominated	

=== Asian Television Award 2013 ===
Nominee / Work	Award	Accolade	Result
Pierre Png	Asian Television Awards 2013	Best Actor in a Supporting Role	Highly Commended

== See also ==
- When Duty Calls
