= Star Awards for Best Drama Serial =

Singaporean television award

Star Awards for Best Drama Serial 最佳戏剧
- Current: Star Awards 2026
- Awarded for: Best overall performance in a Mediacorp drama serial
- Country: Singapore
- Presented by: Mediacorp
- First award: 1994
- Currently held by: Emerald Hill- The Little Nyonya Story (2026)

The Star Awards for Best Drama Serial is an award presented annually at the Star Awards, established in 1994.

The category was introduced in 1996 at the 3rd Star Awards ceremony, where Tofu Street received the award. It honors a Mediacorp drama serial for outstanding overall performance. Nominees are determined by a panel of judges employed by Mediacorp, and winners are selected through a majority vote by the entire judging panel.

Since its inception, the award has been presented to 26 drama serials, with 14 receiving multiple nominations. Unforgivable was the most recent winner in this category. Among all awarded dramas, The Dream Makers is the only drama serial to have won this category twice. Additionally, C.L.I.F. holds the record for the most nominations (five) without a win.

== Winners and nominees ==
Table key
Indicates the winner

Year	Drama	Ref
1990s
1996 (3rd)	Tofu Street	
1996 (3rd)	Morning Express	
1996 (3rd)	The Last Rhythm	
1996 (3rd)	The Teochew Family	
1996 (3rd)	The Golden Pillow	
1997 (4th)	The Price of Peace	
1997 (4th)	The Unbeatables II	
1997 (4th)	The Royal Monk	
1997 (4th)	Longing	
1997 (4th)	The Choice Partner	
1998 (5th)	Stand by Me	
1998 (5th)	Immortal Love	
1998 (5th)	Driven by a Car	
1998 (5th)	The Return of the Condor Heroes	
1998 (5th)	The New Adventures of Wisely	
1999 (6th)	Wok of Life	
1999 (6th)	Stepping Out	
1999 (6th)	Legend of the Eight Immortals	
1999 (6th)	Out to Win	
1999 (6th)	From the Medical Files II	
2000s		
2000 (7th)	Hainan Kopi Tales	
2000 (7th)	Angel's Dream	
2000 (7th)	As You Like It	
2000 (7th)	The Legendary Swordsman	
2000 (7th)	The Tax Files	
2001 (8th)	Three Women and A Half	
2001 (8th)	Beyond the Axis of Truth	
2001 (8th)	Heroes in Black	
2001 (8th)	In Pursuit of Peace	
2001 (8th)	Looking for Stars	
2002 (9th)	Beautiful Connection	
2002 (9th)	No Problem	
2002 (9th)	The Reunion	
2002 (9th)	The Vagrant	
2002 (9th)	Viva Le Famille	
2003 (10th)	Holland V	
2003 (10th)	A Child's Hope	
2003 (10th)	Baby Boom	
2003 (10th)	Springs of Life	
2003 (10th)	The Unbeatables III	
2004 (11th)	A Child's Hope II	
2004 (11th)	Always on My Mind	
2004 (11th)	An Ode to Life	
2004 (11th)	Double Happiness I	
2004 (11th)	Room in My Heart	
2005 (12th)	A New Life	
2005 (12th)	Beyond the aXis of Truth II	
2005 (12th)	Portrait of Home	
2005 (12th)	The Champion	
2005 (12th)	The Dragon Heroes	
2006 (13th)	The Shining Star	
2006 (13th)	Love at 0°C	
2006 (13th)	Rhapsody in Blue	
2006 (13th)	Measure of Man	
2006 (13th)	C.I.D.	
2007 (14th)	Metamorphosis	
2007 (14th)	Like Father, Like Daughter	
2007 (14th)	Mars vs Venus	
2007 (14th)	The Homecoming	
2007 (14th)	The Peak	
2009 (15th)	The Little Nyonya	
2009 (15th)	By My Side	
2009 (15th)	Just in Singapore	
2009 (15th)	Love Blossoms	
2009 (15th)	Perfect Cut	
2009 (15th)	The Golden Path	
2010s
2010 (16th)	Together	
2010 (16th)	Daddy at Home	
2010 (16th)	Housewives' Holiday	
2010 (16th)	Perfect Cut 2	
2010 (16th)	Reunion Dinner	
2011 (17th)	Breakout	
2011 (17th)	New Beginnings	
2011 (17th)	The Family Court	
2011 (17th)	Unriddle	
2011 (17th)	With You	
2012 (18th)	On the Fringe	
2012 (18th)	A Song to Remember	
2012 (18th)	C.L.I.F.	
2012 (18th)	Kampong Ties	
2012 (18th)	Secrets for Sale	
2013 (19th)	Pillow Talk	
2013 (19th)	Don't Stop Believin'	
2013 (19th)	Game Plan	
2013 (19th)	Poetic Justice	
2013 (19th)	Unriddle 2	
2014 (20th)	The Dream Makers	
2014 (20th)	The Journey: A Voyage	
2014 (20th)	C.L.I.F. 2	
2014 (20th)	96°C Café	
2014 (20th)	Beyond	
2015 (21st)	The Journey: Tumultuous Times	
2015 (21st)	Against the Tide	
2015 (21st)	Blessings	
2015 (21st)	C.L.I.F. 3	
2015 (21st)	Three Wishes	
2016 (22nd)	The Dream Makers II	
2016 (22nd)	118	
2016 (22nd)	Crescendo	
2016 (22nd)	The Journey: Our Homeland	
2016 (22nd)	Tiger Mum	
2017 (23rd)	Hero	
2017 (23rd)	The Dream Job	
2017 (23rd)	You Can Be an Angel 2	
2017 (23rd)	C.L.I.F. 4	
2017 (23rd)	Fire Up	
2018 (24th)	When Duty Calls	
2018 (24th)	Have a Little Faith	
2018 (24th)	Mightiest Mother-in-Law	
2018 (24th)	My Friends from Afar	
2018 (24th)	While We Are Young	
2019 (25th)	Blessings 2	
2019 (25th)	A Million Dollar Dream	
2019 (25th)	Say Cheese	
2019 (25th)	VIC	
2019 (25th)	You Can Be An Angel 3	
2020s
2021 (26th)	A Quest to Heal	
2021 (26th)	A Jungle Survivor	
2021 (26th)	All is Well – SG	
2021 (26th)	C.L.I.F. 5	
2021 (26th)	Daybreak	
2021 (26th)	Hello From The Other Side	
2021 (26th)	My One in a Million	
2022 (27th)	My Star Bride	
2022 (27th)	Crouching Tiger Hidden Ghost	
2022 (27th)	Mind Jumper	
2022 (27th)	Soul Old Yet So Young	
2022 (27th)	The Takedown	
2023 (28th)	Your World In Mine	
2023 (28th)	Dark Angel	
2023 (28th)	Genie In A Cup	
2023 (28th)	When Duty Calls S2	
2023 (28th)	You Can Be An Angel S4	
2024 (29th)	All That Glitters	
2024 (29th)	Cash on Delivery	
2024 (29th)	Oppa, Saranghae!	
2024 (29th)	Shero	
2024 (29th)	Till the End	
2025 (30th)	Unforgivable	
2025 (30th)	Kill Sera Sera	
2025 (30th)	Once Upon A New Year's Eve	
2025 (30th)	To Be Loved	
2025 (30th)	Born to Shine	
2026 (31th)	Emerald Hill-The Little Nyonya Story	
2026 (31th)	Another Wok of Life	
2026 (31th)	Fixing Fate	
2026 (31th)	I Believe I Can Fly	
2026 (31th)	The Gift of Time	

== Multiple wins and nominations ==
The following dramas received two or more Best Drama Serial awards:

Wins	Dramas	Nominations
2	The Dream Makers	2

The following dramas received two or more Best Drama nominations:

Nominations	Dramas
5	C.L.I.F.
3	The Journey
3	The Unbeatables
3	You Can Be An Angel Too
2	A Child's Hope
2	Beyond the Axis of Truth
2	The Dream Makers
2	Perfect Cut
2	Unriddle
2	Blessings
2	When Duty Calls
