= Blessings (TV series) =

- 祖先保佑
- Genre: Time-travel; Food; Romance; Family
- Written by: Tang Yeow 陈耀; Cheong Yan Ping 张彦平
- Starring: Shaun Chen; Jesseca Liu; Chen Hanwei; Sora Ma; Yao Wenlong; Yvonne Lim
- Opening theme: 祖先保佑 by Chriz Tong
- Ending theme: 1) 不变 by Olivia Ong; 2) 明月千里寄相思 by Jesseca Liu
- Country of origin: Singapore
- Original language: Chinese
- No. of episodes: 20

Production
- Executive producer: Jasmine Woo 邬毓琳
- Producer: Kwek Leng Soong 郭令送
- Running time: approx. 45 minutes (exc. advertisements)

Original release
- Network: MediaCorp Channel 8
- Release: 23 July – 19 August 2014

Related
- Blessings 2 (2018)

Blessings (Chinese: 祖先保佑) is a time-travelling drama series produced by MediaCorp Studios and aired on MediaCorp Channel 8 starting in 2014. The show aired at 9pm on weekdays and had a repeat telecast at 8am the following day. The series stars Shaun Chen, Chen Hanwei, Yao Wenlong, Sora Ma, Yvonne Lim and Jesseca Liu as the main characters of the series. The series is producer Kwek Leng Soong's final drama series before she left MediaCorp in August 2015. A sequel, Blessings 2 was produced and first aired on 1 October 2018.

== Cast ==
- Shaun Chen as Lian Wending
- Jesseca Liu as
  - She Meiren in 2014
  - Lin Xiaomei in 1948
- Sora Ma as
  - Wenrou in 2014
  - Sun Xiulan in 1948
- Chen Hanwei as Lian Daxi
- Yao Wenlong as Lian Shuangxi
- Yvonne Lim as Du Shini
- Youyi as Ouyang Xuan
- Chen Shucheng as Lian Mengyong
- Zhu Houren as She Xingcheng
- Chloe Ng as Alicia Lian
- Mei Xin as Ouyang Xuan
- Zhu Xiufeng as Sis Chun
- Li Wenhai as Lian Xuegeng
- Darryl Yong as Zhanpeng
- Louis Wu as Yuanbin
- Chase Tan as Hai
- Cat Ang as Lian

== Accolades ==
Year	Ceremony	Category	Nominees	Result	Ref
2015	Star Awards	Young Talent Award	Chloe Ng Ying En	Nominated	
2015	Star Awards	Best Theme Song	"祖先保佑"	Nominated	
2015	Star Awards	Best Screenplay	Tang Yeow and Cheong Yan Peng	Won	
2015	Star Awards	Best Cameraman for Drama Programme	Toh Meng Teck	Nominated	
2015	Star Awards	Best Music & Sound Design	Teng Phek Yhen Matthew and Leong Mei Han	Nominated	
2015	Star Awards	Best Actor	Chen Hanwei	Nominated	
2015	Star Awards	Best Supporting Actor	Chen Shucheng	Nominated	
2015	Star Awards	Best Drama Serial	—N/a	Nominated	

== See also ==
- List of MediaCorp Channel 8 Chinese drama series (2010s)
