= The Caregivers =

- Missy 先生
- Genre: Medical; Nursing; Romance
- Story by: Ng Kah Huay 黄佳华
- Starring: Thomas Ong; Tong Bing Yu; Terence Cao; Xiang Yun; Jayley Woo; Bonnie Loo; Tracy Lee
- Opening theme: 天使的翅膀 by Stella Seah Hui Xian
- Ending theme: 有你的地方 by Chris Wang
- Country of origin: Singapore
- Original language: Mandarin
- No. of episodes: 20

Production
- Executive producer: Jasmine Woo 邬毓林
- Production location: Singapore
- Running time: approx. 45 minutes (excluding advertisements)

Original release
- Network: Mediacorp Channel 8 (Singapore)
- Release: 12 March – 8 April 2014

The Caregivers (Chinese: Missy 先生) is a nursing and medical show which made its debut on 12 March 2014. It stars Thomas Ong, Tong Bing Yu, Terence Cao, Xiang Yun, Jayley Woo, Bonnie Loo & Tracy Lee as the casts of the series. The show aired at 9pm on weekdays and had a repeat telecast at 8am the following day.

== Cast ==
- Thomas Ong as Yang Hao Tian 杨浩天, a nurse
- Tong Bing Yu as Fang Yiting 方仪婷, Yang's girlfriend
- Terence Cao as Lin Jiaming 林家明
- Xiang Yun as Molly
- Jayley Woo as Yang Haomin 杨浩敏, Yang's sister
- Tracy Lee as Liang Xiaoyu 梁小雨, a nurse
- Zhang Wei as Fang's grandfather

Special appearances and cameos

- Bonnie Loo as Coco
- Edwin Goh as Wei Lun 伟轮
- Zhou Ying as Lin Si'en
- Youyi as Zhang Xiuya 张秀雅
- Priscelia Chan as Du Xiaofeng 度小风

== Accolades ==
Year	Award	Category	Nominee / Work	Result	Ref
2014	Asian Television Awards	Best Actress in a Supporting Role	Xiang Yun	Nominated	
2015	Star Awards	Best Screenplay	Ng Kah Huay	Nominated	
2015	Star Awards	Best Costume & Image Design	Tee Yu Yan	Nominated	
2015	Star Awards	Best Cameraman for Drama Programme	Steve Wong	Nominated	
2015	Star Awards	Best Supporting Actress	Xiang Yun	Nominated	

== See also ==
- List of programmes broadcast by Mediacorp Channel 8
