= Finding 8 =

Finding 8 is an outdoor game show by Singapore's MediaCorp Channel 8. It debuted on 7 July 2014. There are four main hosts: Kym Ng, Lee Teng, Quan Yi Fong and Ben Yeo. It is similar to the Korean variety show Running Man.

In each episode, guests join the four hosts e.g. Vivian Lai and Guo Liang. There are missions to complete, upon which competitors receive a clue on "8", which might be a person or an object. The first person who finds 8 will receive a $1000 shopping voucher and a secret weapon. The secret weapon (神秘力量) may be used in the following episode to help the host win.

== Episodes ==
Episode	Title	Guest Stars	Winner
1	Tampines	None	Lee Teng
2	Sentosa & Singapore Flyer	None	Lee Teng & Ben Yeo
3	Bintan Lagoon Resort I	None	Quan Yi Fong
4	Bintan Lagoon Resort II	Vivian Lai & Jeremy Chan	Lee Teng
5	Singapore Changi Airport	None	Lee Teng
6	Institute Of Technical Education	Felicia Chin & Aloysius Pang	Quan Yi Fong, Ben Yeo & Kym Ng
7	Singapore IKEA & Orchid Country Club	Ian Fang, Shane Pow, Pan Lingling & Huang Shinan	Quan Yi Fong & Ben Yeo
8	Jurong SAFRA & Westgate Mall	None	Quan Yi Fong & Ben Yeo
9	112 Katong Mall	None	Kym Ng
10	Star Virgo Cruise Merlion Park & Botanic Gardens	Guo Liang	Ben Yeo
