= Morning Express (2014 TV series) =

- 晨光第一线
- Genre: Documentary; Current Affairs
- Developed by: Zhao Quan Yin (赵全胤)
- Written by: Lim Wee Leng (林伟玲)
- Directed by: Xiao Xueping (肖雪萍)
- Presented by: Ng Siew Ling (黄秀玲); Zhao Quan Yin (赵全胤); Yang Zheng Hua (杨振华)
- Country of origin: Singapore
- Original language: Mandarin

Production
- Producer: Chng Kheng Leng (庄庆宁)
- Production location: Mediacorp Campus 1 Stars Avenue Singapore 138507
- Editor: Lynne Chee (徐赟羚)
- Running time: 30 minutes (with advertisements)

Original release
- Network: Mediacorp Channel 8
- Release: 1 September 2014 – 18 July 2025

Morning Express (Chinese: 晨光第一线) was a documentary/current affairs programme produced by Mediacorp Channel 8. It is hosted by a team of the 3 hosts/newscasters consisting of Zhao Quan Yin, Ng Siew Ling and Yang Zheng Hua. The show covers a daily brand news belt, headlines of different newspapers, financial and economics bulletin, as well as different lifestyle topic every day. The show replaced the weekday broadcast of Good Morning Singapore.

On 14 July 2025, it was announced that the last edition of Morning Express will be produced on Friday, 18 July 2025. Taking over this bulletin will be a repeat telecast of Talk of the Town, a segment that was first introduced on Hello Singapore on 10 February 2025.

== Presenters ==
- 黄秀玲 Ng Siew Ling
- 杨振华 Yang Zheng Hua
- 赵全胤 Zhao Quan Yin

== Former Presenters ==
- 蒋睆 Jiang Huan - Left in Mar 2019年已离职 (ThxD GmbH).
- 林稚瑛 Kristine Lim Zhi Ying - Went over to Current Affairs in Apr 2021 (焦点 focus), eventually joined CNA.
- 林佩芬 Lim Pei Fen - Interim presenter debut in Nov 2024, went over to News Affairs (Hello Singapore 狮城有约) in Feb 2025.
- 苏美兰 Soh Bee Lan - Went on maternity leave in Nov 2024, subsequently returned to News Affairs (Hello Singapore 狮城有约) in Apr 2025.

== Segments ==
- 0900 - 0910: News
- 0910 - 0920: Newspaper (纸上风云)
- 0920 - 0930: Lifestyle topics of the day
  - Monday: Spotlight (晨光聚焦)
  - Tuesday: Sincerity (晨心诚意)
  - Wednesday: Trending (潮流解码)
  - Thursday: World News (着眼天下)
  - Friday: Hobby (玩物壮志)

== Trivia ==
- Kristine Lim Zhi Ying's first current affairs program and comeback after she left for Beijing to be a correspondent for Channel NewsAsia and is the only one who crosses over between presenters, newscasters, Hello Singapore and right now Went over to Current Affairs Focus.
- Yang Zhen Hua and Jiang Huan's debut current affairs programme.
- The programme was televised at 11:00am on 25 March 2015, during the national mourning period. It was extended to a 1-hour version from 9 to 10 am on 12 September 2016 and aired outdoors for the first time in Bedok Town Centre.

== Accolades ==
Nominee / Work	Award	Accolade	Result
Chia Jia Xin 谢家芯	Best Programme Promo 最佳宣传短片	Star Awards 2015 Show 1 红星大奖2015 - 第一场	Nominated

== See also ==
- Channel 8 (Singaporean TV channel)
- 8world
