= Sora Ma =

Malaysian actress (born 1984)

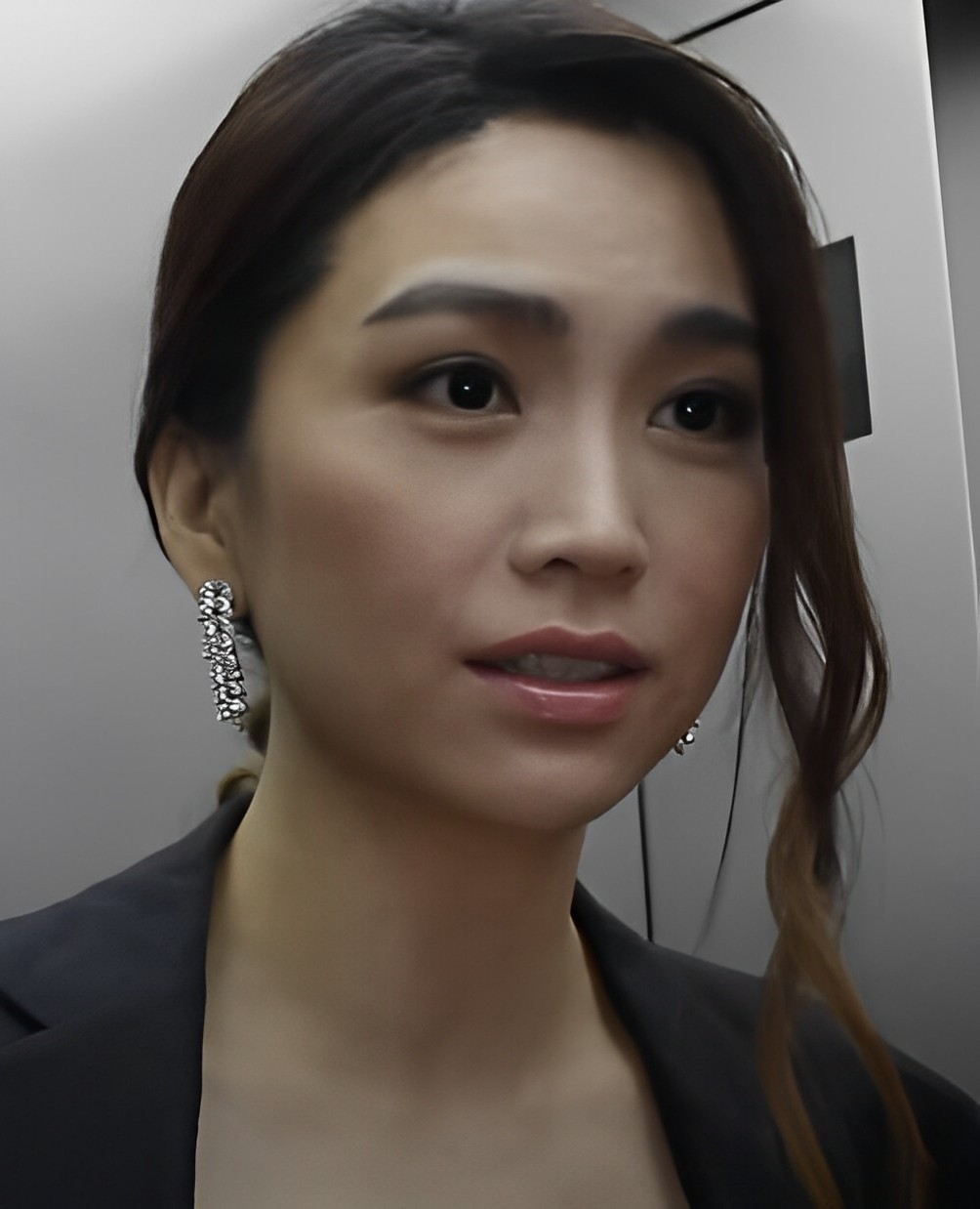
- Ma in April 2017
- Born: 22 January 1984 (age 42); Malaysia
- Education: Kuala Lumpur Metropolitan University College; Curtin University
- Occupations: Actress; host; businesswoman; pilates instructor
- Years active: 2010–present
- Spouse: Mr R (m. 2021; died 2024)
- Children: 1
- Awards: Star Search 2010 : 4th Runner-up

Stage name
- Traditional Chinese: 馬藝瑄
- Simplified Chinese: 马艺瑄
- Hanyu Pinyin: Mǎ Yìxuān
- Jyutping: Maa5 Ngai6 Syun1

Birth name
- Traditional Chinese: 馬舒鸞
- Simplified Chinese: 马舒鸾
- Hanyu Pinyin: Mǎ Shūluán

Sora Ma (born 22 January 1984) is a Singaporean actress. She was a full-time Mediacorp artiste till 2017. Ma is also a qualified pilates instructor and the founder of charity organisation Heartworks SG.

== Early life ==
Ma's parents are divorced and she has an older brother. She was mostly brought up by her grandparents in Sungei Petani, Kedah, Malaysia.

Ma studied at Kuala Lumpur Metropolitan University College and graduated from Curtin University in Perth, Australia, specialising in management and marketing. Prior to joining Star Search, she did some modelling work and was a financial planner.

== Career ==
A former commerce graduate, model and beauty queen, Ma was offered a contract by MediaCorp after reaching the top 5 in Star Search 2010. Ma has a fan club called Sorarity. In 2012, Ma scored her first acting nomination for her role in Love Thy Neighbour. She was nominated at the Asian Television Awards 2014 for her role in C.L.I.F. 3.

In October 2014, Ma, with Felicia Chin, opened a retro-themed cafe, The Mama Shop, in Chinatown, Singapore. The cafe closed in August 2015.

In 2017, Ma received her first Star Awards for Top 10 Most Popular Female Artistes nomination and won the award in the same year. On 31 December, Ma announced in an instagram post that she would be leaving Mediacorp.

In 2018, Ma set up a production company, Socius Realm.

In 2022, Ma joined Singapore media company 8028 Holdings. She won the Best Supporting Actress award for her role in the drama This Land is Mine at the Asia Contents Awards.

== Personal life ==
In June 2021, Ma announced that she is engaged to her boyfriend, only known as 'Mr R', of eight years. She registered her marriage later in October and held a wedding banquet in Singapore on 24 July 2022.

In August 2023, chairman of the Singapore Artistes Association, Marcus Chin, revealed that Ma and her charity organisation Heartworks SG donated S$3,000 to Chin's personal fundraising movement for getai singer Angie Lau's medical treatment. Chin said that his artiste friends requested to donate anonymously but he decided to list all the donors in a Facebook livestream for transparency and to avoid speculations.

In March 2024, Ma announced her pregnancy and her child was conceived through in vitro fertilisation. In August, she gave birth to a son, Skye. In December, Ma revealed that her husband 'Mr R' died unexpectedly around June before the birth of their child.

Ma became a Singaporean citizen on 22 January 2025.

== Filmography ==
=== Television series ===
Year	Title	Role	Notes	Ref.
2011	Let's Play Love	Priscilla		
2011	Love Thy Neighbour	Dai Peijun		
2012	Unriddle 2	Sun Mingwei		
2012	Yours Fatefully	Ruan Feng		
2012	Poetic Justice	Zhong Ruiyao		
2012	Beyond	Qiu Lixuan		
2013	It's a Wonderful Life	Zhang Xixi		
2013	Sudden	Guan Jiemin		
2014	Yes We Can! (我们一定行！)	Zhu Siyi		
2014	Spice Up (幸福料理)	Lisa Wang Lichun		
2014	C.L.I.F. 3	Jelly Weng Xuanmei		
2014	Blessings	Sun Xiulan		
2014	Blessings	Wenrou		
2015	118	Chen Meizhen		
2015	Life Is Beautiful	Ann		
2015	Hand In Hand	He Xinying		
2015	Life - Fear Not	Zhang Xiuyan		
2016	House of Fortune	Hu Simin		
2016	C.L.I.F. 4	Jelly Weng Xuanmei		
2016	Soul Reaper (勾魂使者)	Xu Ruiting		
2016	Hero	Ma Yixuan		
2017	118 II	Chen Meizhen		
2017	Eat Already? 3	Ma Xiaoling		
2018	Mind Matters	Song Jiefang		
2018	118 Reunion (118 大团圆)	Chen Meizhen		
2021	Crouching Tiger Hidden Ghost	Ah Jie		
2022	This Land Is Mine	Helen		

=== Films ===
Year	Title	Role	Notes	Ref.
2016	My Diva Master	Lady master 大师姐姐	Youtube film, as scriptwriter and actress	
2011	Provision Shop	Gao Lingling	Telemovie	

== Awards and nominations ==
Year	Ceremony	Category	Work	Results	Ref.
2012	Star Awards	Best Newcomer	Love Thy Neighbour	Nominated	
2013	Star Awards	Rocket Award	It's a Wonderful Life	Nominated	
2014	Star Awards	BottomSlim Sexiest Legs Award	—N/a	Nominated	
2014	Star Awards	Asian Skin Solution Award	—N/a	Nominated	
2014	Asian Television Awards	Best Actress in a Supporting Role	C.L.I.F. 3	Nominated	
2015	Star Awards	London Choco Roll Happiness Award	C.L.I.F. 3	Nominated	
2015	Star Awards	Tokyo Bust Express Sexy Babe Award	—N/a	Nominated	
2017	Star Awards	Top 10 Most Popular Female Artistes	—N/a	Won	
2022	Asia Contents Awards	Best Supporting Actress	This Land is Mine	Won	
