= C.L.I.F. 3 =

Singaporean TV series

- 警徽天职3
- Genre: Police procedural
- Written by: Seah Choon Guan; Tang Yeow; Cheong Yan Ping
- Directed by: Png Keh Hock; Oh Liang Cai; Gao Shu Yi; Canter Chia
- Starring: Li Nanxing; Rui En; Qi Yuwu; Joanne Peh; Elvin Ng; Tracy Lee
- Opening theme: "一念之差" by ah5ive
- Ending theme: (No commentaries for News Tonight)
- Country of origin: Singapore
- Original languages: Mandarin, with some English dialogue
- No. of episodes: 25 (list of episodes)

Production
- Executive producer: Chong Liung Man
- Producer: Kwek Leng Soong
- Running time: approx. 45 minutes

Original release
- Network: Mediacorp Channel 8
- Release: 9 April – 13 May 2014

Related
- C.L.I.F. (2011); C.L.I.F. 2 (2013); C.L.I.F. 4 (2016); C.L.I.F. 5 (2019)

C.L.I.F. 3
- Traditional Chinese: 警徽天職3
- Simplified Chinese: 警徽天职3
Transcriptions
Standard Mandarin
- Hanyu Pinyin: Jǐng Huī Tiān Zhí 3

C.L.I.F. 3 (Courage, Loyalty, Integrity, Fairness, or 警徽天职3) was a police procedural series produced by Mediacorp in collaboration with the Singapore Police Force. It was broadcast from 9 April to 13 May 2014 on MediaCorp Channel 8 and consists of 25 episodes. It stars Li Nanxing, Rui En, Qi Yuwu, Joanne Peh, Elvin Ng, and Tracy Lee for the third installment of the series.

== Plot ==
The series continues several story lines from the first and second seasons, but it delves further into the relationships of the characters. Yew Jia has been promoted a rank. He and his girlfriend, later fiancée, Xin Yi, are back together again. Xin Yi has since been transferred to the Traffic Police Department and struggles with post-traumatic stress disorder from her time overseas with the UN after witnessing an incident there. Tze Keat and Wee Lum Thiam are married and the latter has transferred from the Forensics Branch to the Criminal Investigation Department (CID). Kwee Xiang and Xiaoyang return from the first season and it is revealed that they are now with the Traffic Police Department. Fugitive Chan Yin Kwun, a former psychiatrist and pedophile, returns with a vengeance to settle scores with Lum Thiam.

== Cast ==
=== Main cast ===
- Li Nanxing as ASP Wee Lum Thiam (魏蓝天) who is in charge of Team A, Specialised Crime Division, CID.
  - Teenage version portrayed by Edwin Goh.
- Rui En as SSI Ng Tze Keat (黄芷婕) who is in charge Team C of Special Investigation Section, CID.
- Qi Yuwu as SSI(2) Albert Tang Yew Jia (唐耀佳), Senior Investigating Officer at Special Investigation Section, CID.
- Joanne Peh as ASP Leow Xinyi (廖心怡), Deputy Head Investigation, Traffic Police Department.
- Elvin Ng as SSGT Teo Kwee Xiang (张贵祥), Patrol Officer, Traffic Police Department.
- Tracy Lee as INSP Han Xiaoyang (韩晓洋), Senior Investigation Officer
- Cavin Soh as SI Jimmy Tai Datung (戴大东), Senior Investigation Officer of Team A, Specialised Crime Division, CID.

=== Supporting cast ===
Cast	Role	Description
Hu Wensui	Koh How Ping (许浩平)	SSI Koh How Peng; Member of Team C (SIS).
Dylan Quek	Loh Ching Han (罗清瀚)	SSI Loh Ching Han; Member of Team C (SIS), former Staff Sergeant (SSGT) in Police Coast Guard (member of ASP Zhang Cheng Ling's team).
Zheng Geping	Teo Guan Yeow (张源耀)	Commissioner of Police Teoh Guan Yeow; Appeared to distribute overseas service medals to Leow Xin Yi and others after they returned from their UN Peace Keeping tour, and appeared again on their promotion.
Richard Low		Wee Lum Thiam and Yang Zhongzheng's superior during NS.
Allen Chen	Qiu Xing An (邱星安)	DPP in the Attorney-General's Chambers. He prosecuted Xiaoyang's cousin Han Junxi who was involved in a traffic accident that killed Yin Kwun's parents. Han Xiaoyang's boyfriend.
欧宗强	Mark Liu (刘浩明)	Member of Team A (SCD).
Ryan Lian	Wu Peifu (巫培福)	Member of Traffic Police. Injured his left arm after trying to stop a driver from slowing down, and is unable to ride a motorcycle in episode 19.
Alaric Tay	James	Chief of the Central Narcotics Bureau. Went undercover with Kwee Xiang to gain information of Ding Youpeng.
郑有翔	Gary	
Kanny Theng	Grace	Member of Team A (SCD).

=== Other cast ===
Cast	Role	Description	Episodes appeared
Terence Cao	Yang Zhongzheng (杨忠正)	Main Villain, repented on Episode 25. Best friend of Lum Thiam during NS. Areya's boyfriend. Yang Hongxi's father. Destroyed the evidence pertaining the death of Jeffrey Thomas in episode 1. Badly injured while defending Lum Thiam from gangsters when they spiked his drink in episode 9. Arrested being involved in the syndicate and for murdering Zhuo Kaiwen. (Arrested - episode 25); Teenage version portrayed by 陈志豪.	1–4, 6–10, 13–21, 23–25; 2, 4 (teenage)
杨前春	Pongsatorn (蓬萨通)	Thai national. Previously involved in an armed robbery. Impersonated the police and killed Jeffrey Thomas. Shot by STAR after he took a housewife hostage. (Deceased - episode 1)	1
郭雅长	Bodin (博丁)	Thai national. Previously convicted of manslaughter. Impersonated the police and killed Jeffrey Thomas. Shot by Lum Thiam while fighting with him and Jimmy. (Deceased - episode 1)	1
Pierre Png	Chan Yin Kwun (陈彦均)	Main Villain From C.L.I.F. 2 Fugitive-at-large Chan Yin Kwun/Chan Yin Kwan; Former psychiatrist. Chan Kuo Bang and Wang Meifang's son. Chen Yanli's brother . Died after Lum Thiam shot at him at the playground. (Deceased - episode 6)	2–6, 15
Jayley Woo	Leow Zhenting (廖贞婷)	Supporting Villain; Jen Leow; Leow Xinyi's paternal half sister. Neighbour of the Teo family. Involved in a car accident-cum-kidnapping case. Fell from a height and sustained life-threatening injuries in Episode 18 after Yew Jia gave chase to her, succumbed to her injuries and died in Episode 19. (Deceased - episode 19)	2, 6, 9, 11, 14, 16–19
Louis Wu	Han Junxi (韩俊希)	Han Xiaoyang's elder cousin Shen Shengli's friend. Annie's boyfriend. Caused the deaths of Yin Kwun's parents in episode 2. Sentenced to 30 months' imprisonment and barred from driving for 10 years. (Jailed - episode 11)	2, 4–5
Henry Heng	Chan Kuo Bang (陈国邦)	Chan Yin Kwun and Chan Yanli's father Was hit by Han Junxi's car in episode 2. Succumbed to his injuries and died days after Yanjun's visit. (Deceased - episode 4)	2, 4
林倩如	Wang Meifang (王美芳)	Chan Yin Kwun and Chan Yanli's mother Was hit by Han Junxi's car and died on the spot. (Deceased - episode 2)	2, 4
Sora Ma	Eng Xuan Bee (翁选美)	Jelly, Xuan as in beauty, Mei as in beauty (选美的选，选美的美), Eng Suan Bee; Living with Guixiang. Assistant of Lulu's Wonderful Nightclub after being arrested for suspect prostitution at her former workplace. She is also a singer at that nightclub. Retrenched after Lulu was arrested and the KTV Lounge raided. Badly injured in episode 24 after Dehai tampered with Yang Zhongzheng's brakes. Teo Kwee Xiang's current girlfriend.	3–4, 6-21, 23–25
Bonnie Loo	Yang Hongxi (杨红夕)	Candy; Long-lost teenage daughter of Yang Zhongzheng whom he had been searching for the last decade. Her mother, Areya, was a Thai local who helped Yang Zhongzheng out of the jungle during a trek. Yang Hongxi was sold off to vice rings and eventually ended up in Singapore as an underage prostitute. She was arrested during a raid and was reunited with her father before returning to Thailand. Rescued by the police in episode 25 after being kidnapped by Dehai.	3–4, 6–8, 15, 21, 23–25
Wang Yuqing	Teo Zhiming (张志眀)	Spider Ming (蜘蛛明); Kwee Xiang's father. Fishball noodle stall owner. He is nicknamed "Spider Ming" due to his connection and knowledge of many gangs. Kwee Xiang loathes him a lot. Yew Jia is his friend but does not reveal his police identity to him. Surrendered to the police for extortion and intentional injury to Zhuo Kaiwen. (Arrested - episode 22)	4, 6–10, 12–14, 16–25
林俐延	Chunjiao (林春娇)	Eng Xuan Bee's aunt. Spider Ming's cohabitant. Teo Kwee Fa's mother. Neighbour of the Leow family. Fishball noodle stall owner. Involved in Wati's money extortion case. (Arrested - episode 7)	4, 6–7
Hong Huifang	Luo Lulu (罗露露)	Original name Luo Meiling (罗美玲); Lady boss of Wonderful Nightclub. Lum Thiam's biological mother.	8–9, 11, 13–18, 23–24
Farah Erfina Bte Mohd Azmi	Amina	Leow Xinyi's friend during the peacekeeping tour. Committed suicide after being threatened by terrorists. (Deceased)	9–14
Melody Low	Zhizhi (梁秀芝)	Wonderful Nightclub singer. Alibi for the police impersonation case. Murdered by Tay Jingrong when he impersonated his twin brother and was decapitated. (Deceased - episode 10)	1, 9, 11–12
Gary Tan	Rocky	Member of triad 356. Arrested after he and his gangmates set off to have a showdown with rival triad, Ong Soon Tong. (Arrested - episode 9)	9
Alston Yeo	Teo Kwee Huat (张贵发)	Spider Ming and Chunjiao's son. Teo Kwee Xiang's kid half-brother. Kidnapped by Leow Zhenting in episode 16 after witnessing an accident.	8–9, 16–20, 25
巫奇	Tay Jin Rong (郑锦荣)	Businessman Tay Jin Rong; Zheng Jinghua's elder twin brother. Tumbled down the staircase and fell into a coma in episode 10. Came around and admitted to his crimes in episode 12. (Arrested - episode 12)	9–11
巫奇	Tay Jing Hua (郑锦华)	Guitarist Tay Jing Hua; Zhizhi's ex-boyfriend. Tay Jingrong's younger twin brother. Caused the death of Zhizhi. (Arrested - episode 11)	11–12
郭婷玮	Jinrong's wife (锦荣妻)	Zheng Jinrong's wife.	9–10
林祚纬	Zhao Yonglun (赵咏伦)	Zhao Kesen's son. Leow Zhenting, Bernard, and Bell's friend. Involved in a car accident-cum-kidnapping case.	9, 14, 17–18
Dick Su	Du Xuedong (杜学栋)	Involved in the credit card fraud case. Died after committing suicide by overconsuming sleeping pills. (Deceased - episode 13)	13–17
潘伟强	Guo Chengwei (郭成威)	Involved in the credit card fraud case. Luo Lulu's lackey and brother of Zhao Xuewei.	13, 15–16, 23–24
杨迪嘉	Celine See	Du Xuedong's ex-girlfriend and superior.	13, 15
Zong Zijie	Bernard	Leow Zhenting, Zhao Yonglun, and Bell's friend. Involved in a car accident-cum-kidnapping case.	14, 17–18
Leron Heng	Bell	Leow Zhenting, Zhao Yonglun, and Bernard's friend. Involved in a car accident-cum-kidnapping case.	14, 17–18
Andi Lim	Dehai (德海)	Main Villain; Yang Zhongzheng's personal assistant. Attempted to kill Yang Zhongzheng in episode 25 for betraying the syndicate but is shot by the police instead. (Deceased - episode 25)	3, 15, 18, 20, 23–25
Jerry Yeo	Zhuo Kaiwen (卓凯文)	Bank investment advisor. Yang Zhongzheng's accomplice. Killed by Yang Zhongzheng. (Deceased - episode 22)	17–18, 20–25
陈瑞民	Liang Qishi (梁其世)	Television station warehouse manager. Witness of the car accident. Has a tendency to misread numbers.	17–18
Marcus Mok	Zhao Kesen (赵克森)	Minister. Zhao Yonglun's father.	18
Chaudhary Jayeshkumar	Kumar Shama	Illegal construction worker. Run over by Zhao Yonglun's car after the gang got high on drugs. (Deceased - episode 16)	18
Zen Chong	Ding Youpeng (丁友朋)	Caterpillar (毛毛虫); Member of the drug syndicate. Yang Zhongzheng's accomplice. Teo Kwee Xiang's childhood friend. Arrested during a raid when he brought Kwee Xiang to the drug warehouse. (Arrested - episode 21)	19–21
Tay Yong Meng	Shi Yiyuan (石毅元)	Drug dealer. (Arrested - episode 19)	19
马天凌	Wang Zhongkun (王仲昆)	Drug syndicate. Yang Zhongzheng's accomplice. Revealed Teo Kwee Xiang as a traffic policeman. (Arrested - episode 21)	21

=== Cameo appearances ===
Cast	Role	Description	Episodes appeared
Tan Tiow Im	Leow Xianchang (廖显昌)	Liao Xinyi and Jen's grandfather. Ong Xiuling's husband. Neighbour of the Zhang family.	2, 7, 18- Note: Ended his part, will not appear in C.L.I.F. 4.
Ang Twa Bak	Ong Xiuling (汪秀玲)	Leow Xinyi and Jen's grandmother. Leow Xianchang's wife. Neighbour of the Zhang family.	2, 7, 18- Note: Ended her part, will not appear in C.L.I.F. 4.
施慧玲	Zhang Ruihua (章瑞桦)	Jimmy Tai Tatung's wife. Tunghua's mother.	9, 13, 17, 23–24
Lorraine Koh	Tai Tung Hua (戴东桦)	Jimmy Tai Tatung and Zhang Ruihua's daughter. Diagnosed with autism. Suffers from acute leukemia.	17, 23–24
李健汉	Mr. Leow (廖父)	Liao Xinyi and Jen's father. Detests Tang Yaojia for causing Zhenting's death.	19–20
陶樱	Mrs. Leow (廖母)	Jen's mother. Detests Tang Yaojia for causing Zhenting's death.	19–20

== Accolades ==
Organisation	Year	Category	Nominees	Result	Ref
Asian Television Awards	2014	Best Supporting Actress	Sora Ma	Nominated	
Star Awards	2015	Best Music & Sound Design	Gao Jun Wei & Zheng Kai Hua	Won	
Star Awards	2015	Best Theme Song	《一念之差》 by ah5ive The Band	Nominated	
Star Awards	2015	Best Director	Png Keh Hock	Nominated	
Star Awards	2015	Best Screenplay	Tang Yeow, Cheong Yan Peng, Seah Choon Guan	Nominated	
Star Awards	2015	Favourite Onscreen Couple (Drama)	Li Nanxing and Rui En	Nominated	
Star Awards	2015	Favourite Onscreen Couple (Drama)	Qi Yu Wu and Joanne Peh	Nominated	
Star Awards	2015	Best Actor	Qi Yu Wu	Nominated	
Star Awards	2015	Best Actress	Joanne Peh	Nominated	
Star Awards	2015	Best Drama Serial	—N/a	Nominated	

== See also ==
- When Duty Calls
