= China Morning Express =

Newspaper in People's Republic of China

Morning Express (Chinese: 今日早报) was a metropolitan daily newspaper in Zhejiang, China. It was founded in June 2000. It has a similar layout to the City Newsflash. The newspaper was operated by the Zhejiang Daily Press Group. It ceased publication on January 1, 2016.
