= 8world =

Chinese news outlet in Singapore

8world News
- Native name: 8视界新闻
- Industry: News broadcasting
- Headquarters: Mediacorp Campus 1 Stars Avenue Singapore 138507
- Parent: Mediacorp
- Website: 8world.com

8world News is a Singaporean news broadcasting company. It broadcasts in Mandarin Chinese. It is produced by Mediacorp's Chinese News and Current Affairs department, which also creates programming for Mediacorp's other Mandarin-language television channels, Channels 8 and U.

Before 2010, 8world News delivered its broadcasts at midday, evening, and late at night.

In 2010, Mediacorp underwent organisational changes, including a reduction in the MediaCorp News Group workforce.

On 20 October 2014, 8world News implemented further scheduling changes. "Hello Singapore" replaced "Singapore Today" as the weekday evening program. This new format integrated news segments within the show and was broadcast live. Additionally, midday news was abandoned on weekends.

On 13 March 2017, Channel 8 News commenced broadcasting from its new headquarters. This relocation followed the final broadcast from the previous Caldecott Hill location on 12 March 2017.

The move to the new facility facilitated a comprehensive upgrade, encompassing revised graphics, modernised subtitles, and the implementation of advanced hardware.

On 1 April 2021, 8world News implemented subtitling in Chinese for its programs.

== Exceptions ==
The news timeslots are mostly fixed. Exceptions:

- On National Day (9 August), Hello Singapore (weekday) or Singapore Today (weekend) moves earlier to facilitate the live broadcast of the National Day Parade.
- On National Day Rally, Singapore Today is presented before the live broadcast of the National Day Rally speeches at 6.45pm.
- News Tonight is not presented on Polling Day of the Singapore General Elections.
- Channel U aired its first "live" telecast edition of News Tonight at 11:00pm on 5 May 2013. This was the first time Channel U did so in three years, to present the live results of the 2013 Malaysian general election.
- During the period of National Mourning from 23 to 29 March 2015 in lieu of the death of Lee Kuan Yew, all MediaCorp channels presented the highlights and latest news regarding Lee. A 15-minute special edition of News 8 appeared at One on 28 March 2015 (Saturday).
- Channel U aired a live telecast version of "News Tonight" at 11pm on 1 September 2023 to present the results of the 2023 Singaporean presidential election.
