= Reunion dinner (disambiguation) =

It is customary for Chinese and Vietnamese to hold reunion dinner for family members to gather on the eve of Chinese New Year or Tết.

Reunion dinner may also refer to:

== Film and television ==
- Reunion Dinner (film) - 2022 film
- Reunion Dinner (TV series) - 2009 TV series
