= Happy Family (Singaporean TV series) =

- 过好年
- Genre: Family; Chinese New Year
- Written by: 黄佳华 Ng Kah Huay
- Starring: Rui En; Chen Shucheng; Ann Kok; Darren Lim; Cynthia Koh; Shaun Chen; Chen Tianwen; Pan Lingling
- Opening theme: 家缘 by 蔡艾珈 Cai Ai Jia
- Ending theme: 不了心疼 by 蔡艾珈 Cai Ai Jia
- Country of origin: Singapore
- Original language: Chinese
- No. of episodes: 20

Production
- Producer: 袁树伟 Paul Yuen
- Running time: approx. 45 minutes per episode

Original release
- Network: MediaCorp TV Channel 8
- Release: 19 January – 16 February 2010

Related
- Reunion Dinner (2009 Chinese New Year Drama Series); Prosperity (2011); Reunion Dinner (2022 Chinese New Year Movie)

Happy Family
- Traditional Chinese: 过好年
- Simplified Chinese: 过好年
Transcriptions
Standard Mandarin
- Hanyu Pinyin: guò hǎo nián

Happy Family (Chinese: 过好年) is a Singaporean family-themed Chinese drama which was telecasted on Singapore's free-to-air channel, MediaCorp Channel 8. It stars Rui En, Chen Shucheng, Ann Kok, Darren Lim, Cynthia Koh, Shaun Chen, Chen Tianwen and Pan Lingling as the casts of the series. It made its debut on 19 January 2010 and ended on 16 February 2010. This drama series consists of 20 episodes, and was screened on every weekday night at 9:00 pm.

== Plot ==
Chinese New Year is around the corner, and Lin Xiaodong (Rui En) is busy stocking up on festive goods for the store she owns with her grandfather Dong Jianye (Chen Shucheng). Xiaodong is adopted by Jianye after her mother died in a fire. She has assumed that the latter has no kin or kith, until the appearance of a young Japanese man, Noguchi Nariyasu (Remus Kam). Nariyasu is the stepson of Jian Ye’s eldest son, Dong Jinxing (Chen Tianwen), and through Nariyasu, Xiaodong realizes that Jian Ye also has another son and daughter named Dong Muxing (Darren Lim) and Dong Shuixing (Ann Kok) respectively. Xiaodong discovers the family photo that Jianye hides under his pillow taken 17 years ago. When he is taken ill, she brings it upon herself to help him reunite his family. Together with Nariyasu, Xiaodong looks for all of Jianye’s children but she soon finds out the ugly truth behind the family’s estrangement. Xiaodong is determined to help Jianye resolve his family issues and hopes to fulfill his wish for another family photograph and reunion dinner with his children.

== Cast ==
=== Dong Family ===
- Yang Xiaodong/Dingdong (portrayed by Rui En) – a happy-go-lucky girl who simply enjoys life as it is. She was adopted by Dong Jianye (Chen Shucheng) 19 years ago. Now, she is set to bring back the Dong family (Ann Kok, Darren Lim and Chen Tianwen) before Chinese New Year.
- Dong Jianye/Old Fogey (portrayed by Chen Shucheng) – the father of three and adoptive grandfather of Xiaodong. He chases his own children out of his house when they each did something against him. He later adopts Xiaodong. Since then, he never had any reunion dinner with his own family. Chen felt that the drama was his third most satisfied masterpiece.

=== Shui Family ===
- Dong Shuixing/Mary Shui (portrayed by Ann Kok) – mother of Coco, ex-husband of Sun-Shui (Jerry Yeo). She marries Sun-Shui despite Jianye's objection, which leads her to run away from home. Only daughter of Dong Jianye. She was later remarried to Bread Skin (Nelson Chia). She returned to the Dong family after Xiaodong and Noguchi's (Remus Kam) pleading.
- Coco (portrayed by Joey Feng) – only daughter of Shuxing and Sun-Shui. She unknowingly falls in love with Yekou. She thought she had a baby with Ben (Seth Ang). She reconciles with Xiaodong and Noguchi to reunite the Dong family.
- Sun-Shui (portrayed by Jerry Yeo) – Shuixing's lover after she realised that Alex would take care of her. He was looked up high by Coco and was glad they were engaged. He is very caring to the Shui family.
- Alex (portrayed by Alan Tern) – ex-husband of Shuxing. Unwilling father of Coco. Later, he divorces with Shuixing, as he was an abusive husband.

=== Mu Family ===
- Dong Muxing/Mu Xing (portrayed by Darren Lim) – Second son of Jianye and a slacking and gambling addict husband of Mei'e. His gambling addiction enrages his father, which made him run away from home. Father of Chenglong and Chengfeng. He later lands himself in the hospital and tries to commit suicide, but stops when Mei'e arrived.
- Jian Mei'e/Fatty Mei (portrayed by Cynthia Koh) – wife of Mu Xing. Mother of Chenglong and Chengfeng. She later reconciles with the Dong family and Xiaodong has been helping them with financial problems.
- Dong Chenglong/Jackie Dong (portrayed by Frasier Tiong) – a teenage who helps out with the family financial crises by giving tuition. He later stole money from a gang by Black Eyed Bean because he cannot bear to see his family suffer from a money crisis.
- Dong Chengfeng/Felicia Dong (portrayed by Regene Lim) – Young, obedient and sensitive girl who tries her best to fit into the hellpit family. She avoided visiting her grandfather because she is addicted to studying (thinking she won't get good results if she didn't).

=== Noguchi Family ===
- Dong Jinxing/Master Noguchi (portrayed by Chen Tianwen) – the eldest in the Dong family children. He ran away to home to further his studies. He later married Nako Noguchi and she stops him from going back home. He felt inferior and a let down to his family.
- Noguchi Nako/Madam Noguchi (portrayed by Pan Lingling) – a polio patient and Japanese wife of Master Yekou. She is very demanding, obstructive and vicious. She forced Master not to go back to his home, case he never return.
- Noguchi Nariyasu/Young Master Noguchi (portrayed by Remus Kam) – A lion dancer and strong son of Master and Madam. He stands up for what is right and what is wrong, leading him to follow Xiaodong to find all their relatives. He later opposes Madam for the sake of Xiaodong. He finds Madam's right-hand man Yorro Jong an eyesore.

=== Chen Family ===
- Chen Haojie (portrayed by Shaun Chen) – Xiaodong's love. He is the son of Aunt Chen (Li Yinzhu) and nephew of Chen Liangcai (Marcus Chin). He has a girlfriend, Simin (Ya Hui) but later breaks up because Aunt Chen stops him from going to Australia with Simin.
- Aunt Chen (portrayed by Li Yinzhu) – mother of Haojie, sister of Liangcai. She hoped that Haojie would marry Xiaodong as she is pleasant and respectful. But, she hates Simin as she has no respect for her elders. She sells ladies lingerie. She was later relieved that Xiaodong and Haojie did not date each other or they would commit incest.
- Chen Liangcai/Drunkard (portrayed by Marcus Chin) – brother of Aunt Chen. Long-lost father of Xiaodong. He is always getting himself drunk and womanizing, which made Haojie feels he is a bad example. He later turns over a new leaf when he realised Xiaodong is his daughter.

=== Miscellaneous ===
- Yao Simin (portrayed by Ya Hui) – Haojie's girlfriend. She detests and objects to Xiaodong and Chen-Shen when Chen-Shen is protective towards Xiaodong. She later breaks up with Haojie when he refuses to go to Australia with her, but she knew Aunt Chen was the one who set him up.
- Ben (portrayed by Seth Ang) – a lion dance troupe teaming up with Noguchi. He set up Noguchi and Coco when he had sex with Coco. He later land into jail when Coco testifies against him.
- Yorro Jong (portrayed by Pierre Liam) – the planner who set up everything for his mistress, Madam Yekou. He helps to push Madam around in her wheelchair. He act as her bodyguard.
- Mary (portrayed by Ong Ai Leng) – a prostitute friend of Shuixing. She is a money-grubber who cheats Xiaodong of her money. She gambled away all of her money, but lightens up when Noguchi and Xiaodong ask her to visit their grandpa, Jianye.
- Black Eyed Bean (portrayed by Davien Lim) – a gang leader who is feared by many. However, to support his family, Chenlong stole from him. He gathered his gang to beat Chenlong up and even asked one of the Mu family to be his scapegoat in a gambling den.
- Ding Xie (portrayed by Henry Thia) – Villain of this drama, a scheming old man who loves Xiaodong. He even tries to rape her twice. But, both to no avail. He even tries to set up Noguchi for all the bad things he did. He later lands to jail when Xiaodong, Noguchi, Coco and Jianye testify against him.
- Fatty Zhui (portrayed by Mei Liang) – she sells clothes and was a tailor. Her shop is located beside Jianye's.
- Grape-headed Pong (portrayed by Yuan Ming) – he sells fruits and vegetables. Father of Lemon He (Apple Hong). His shop is located beside Jianye's.
- Lemon He (portrayed by Apple Hong) – a mute girl. She is the daughter of Grape-headed Pong. She falls in love with Ben when she heard his voice. But, she later marry to Zhen Yingxian (Adam Chen) when they went to bed together and Yingxian even rests his face on her boobs.
- Zhen Yingxian (portrayed by Adam Chen) – an evil man who tries to murder Ding Xie, Li-Lian and Lemon He. But, he later marry Lemon as he loved her breasts. Lemon felt defenceless against him.
- Ding Li-Lian (portrayed by He Lima) – wife of Ding Xie. She begged for the safety for Ding Xie. She made Xiaodong soft heartened, but not to Jianye.

== Trivia ==
- This drama's Chinese title was originally meant to be called 全家福.
- The character Black Eyed Bean (portrayed by Davien Lim) was adapted by the band the Black Eyed Peas.
- The character Chenlong comes Bruce Lee.

== Reception ==
Average viewership for each episode is 896,000.

=== Accolades ===
Organisation	Year	Category	Nominee(s)	Result	Ref.
Star Awards	2011	Best Supporting Actress	Cynthia Koh	Nominated	
Star Awards	2011	Young Talent Award	Regene Lim 林詠谊	Won	
Star Awards	2011	Young Talent Award	Fraser Tiong 张家奇	Nominated	
Star Awards	2011	Favourite Female Character	Rui En 瑞恩	Won	
