= Zhu Houren =

Singapore actor (born 1955)

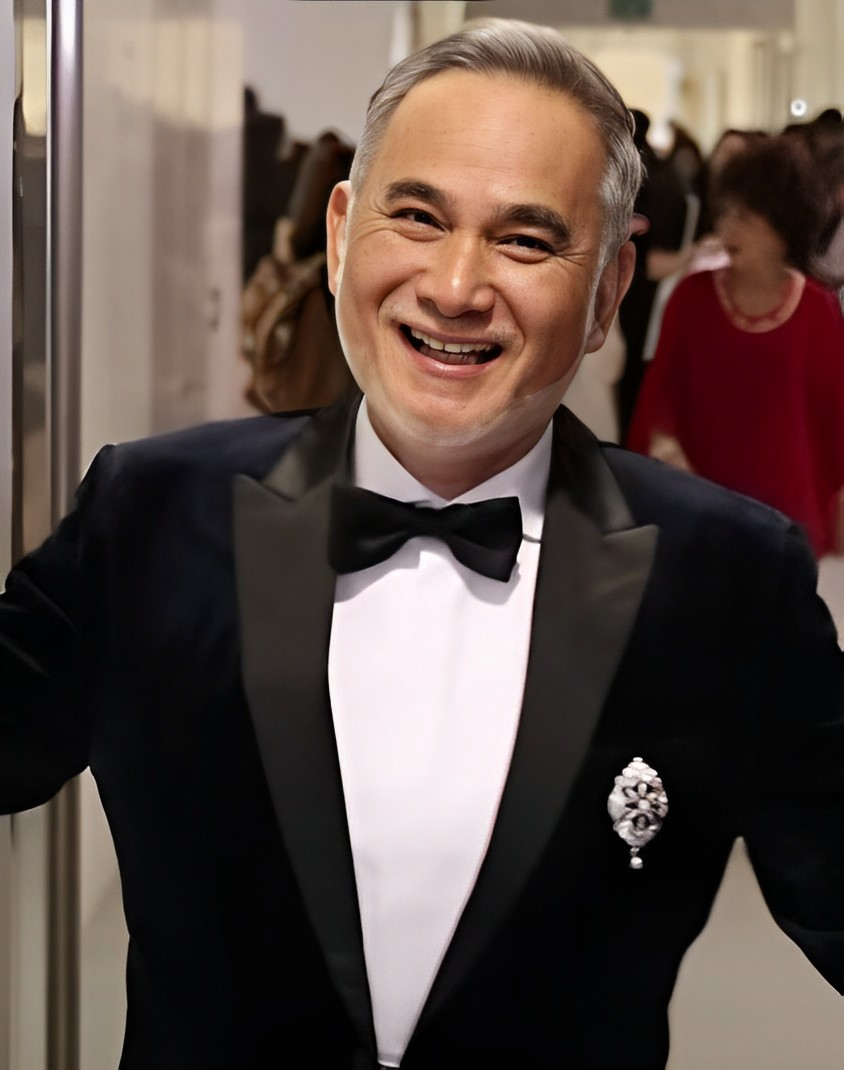
- Zhu at the Star Awards 2017
- Born: Choo Hoh Yim; 30 January 1955 (age 71); Colony of Singapore
- Other name: Jack Choo
- Education: Chung Cheng High School
- Occupations: Actor; filmmaker
- Years active: 1980s−present
- Spouse: Vera Hanitijo (m. 1985)
- Children: Joel Choo and Jonathan Choo
- Awards: Full list

Chinese name
- Chinese: 朱厚任
- Hanyu Pinyin: Zhū Hòurèn

Zhu Houren (born Jack Choo Hoh Yim on 30 January 1955) is a Singaporean actor and filmmaker. In 2003, he made his feature film directorial debut with After School and in 2014 he produced the basketball film, Meeting the Giant.

== Life and career ==
Zhu was educated at Chung Cheng High School.

In 2003, he made his directorial debut in the telefilm After School, while taking on a role in the same film.

During the Star Awards 2010, Zhu won the Best Supporting Actor award for his role as Liang Zhigao 梁志高, an old man who has senile dementia for the drama Reunion Dinner.

Zhu is married to Vera Hanitijo and has 2 sons, Jonathan, an independent director, and Joel, an actor. He has 1 grandchild.

== Filmography ==
=== Television series ===
Year	Title	Role	Notes	Ref.
1989	Good Morning, Sir!	Yu Qingfeng		
1993	The Unbeatables I	Long Tianguang		
1995	Thunder Plot			
1996	The Unbeatables II	Long Tianguang		
1996	The Teochew Family	Fu Yongbing		
1998	The Return of the Condor Heroes	Guo Jing		
1999	Wok of Life	Zeng Nanhua(1990s)		
2004	Oh Dad!			
2004	House of Harmony	Chang Suyin		
2005	Love Concierge	Guo Sen Miao		
2005	The Green Pal			
2005	Beyond the Axis of Truth II			
2006	The Undisclosed	Longtou		
2006	C.I.D.	Tang Jiannian		
2006	Rhapsody In Blue	Ding Zhengda		
2007	Let It Shine	Guo Yaoyao's Father		
2007	Switched!	Qin Fuzhong		
2007	Dear, Dear Son In Law	Jiang Wencai		
2008	The Truth	Su Zhenyuan		
2008	The Defining Moment	Tang Weiye		
2008	By My Side	Lin Chunxiao		
2009	Reunion Dinner	Liang Zhigao		
2009	My Buddy	Li Jiyang		
2009	Baby Bonus	Zheng Facai		
2010	Precious Babes	Cui Guoyao		
2010	Unriddle	Liu Daqing		
2011	Prosperity	Tian Hongming		
2011	Secrets for Sale	Zhou Youguo		
2011	Bountiful Blessings	Huang Erhu		
2012	Rescue 995	Shi Xinguo		
2012	Pillow Talk	Zhang Qian		
2012	Poetic Justice	Fang Renhou		
2012	It Takes Two	Niu's Dad		
2013	Start-Up!	Yin Tang		
2013	96°C Café	Tang San		
2014	Served H.O.T.	Zeng Jianwang		
2014	In The Name Of Love	Wang Weiguo		
2014	Blessings	She Xingcheng		
2014	Three Wishes	Zhao Haiguang		
2015	A Blessed Life	Wang Youguo		
2015	Super Senior	Zhu Xiangdong		
2015	Sealed with a Kiss	Du Zitong		
2015	Life - Fear Not	Xiao Daren		
2016	House of Fortune	Qian Laoshi		
2016	Peace & Prosperity	Ouyang Yixiu		
2016	Trapped Minds	Felix Tan		
2016	Hero	Ou Sihai		
2016	118 II	Liu Dagong		
2017	Eat Already? 2	Zhu Hanjie		
2017	My Teacher Is A Thug	Lian Guodong		
2018	Doppelganger	Li Jianting		
2018	Eat Already? 4	Zhu Hanjie		
2018	Reach For The Skies	Hong Biao		
2018	A Million Dollar Dream	Ba Ge		
2018	A Million Dollar Dream	Ba Di		
2018	Till We Meet Again	Earth Deity		
2018	Till We Meet Again – Prequel	Hua Jiudai		
2019	How Are You?	Gong Jiaqiao		
2019	The Play Book	Passer-by		
2019	Dear Neighbours	He Fan		
2019	Old Is Gold	Uncle Lottery		
2019	Old Is Gold: The Bliss Keeper	Uncle Lottery		
2020	How Are You? 2	Gong Jiaqiao		
2020	Recipe of Life	Qin Fen		
2021	My Star Bride	Zhong Yongnian		
2021	Key Witness	Johnny		
2021	The Heartland Hero	Li Longchen		
2021	The Peculiar Pawnbroker	Zhou Sihai		
2022	My Star Bride - Hi, Mai Phương Thảo	Zhong Yongnian		
2022	You Can Be An Angel 4	Yang Dachao		
2022	Your World in Mine	Hong Xingwang		
2022	Healing Hands	Professor Robert Baey		
2023	Whatever Will Be, Will Be	Liu Dafu	Dialect series	
2023	Till the End	Li Zhiyin		

=== Film ===
Year	Title	Role	Notes	Ref.
2003	After School		As Film director	
2010	Love Cuts	Sissy's doctor	Also producer	
2014	Meeting the Giant	Mr. Long	Also producer, writer and executive producer	
2022	Reunion Dinner	Huang Hailong	Main Antagonist of the film	
2022	Deleted	Fan Dongtian (Four-Faced Buddha)		

== Discography ==
=== Compilation albums ===
Year	English title	Mandarin title
2020	MediaCorp Music Lunar New Year Album 20	裕鼠鼠纳福迎春了

== Awards and nominations ==
Year	Ceremony	Category	Nominated work	Result	Ref
1995	Star Awards	Best Supporting Actor	Thunder Plot (as Ren Yongang)	Nominated	
1996	Star Awards	Best Supporting Actor	The Teochew Family (as Fu Guobin)	Nominated	
1997	Star Awards	Best Actor	The Fall Guy (as Huaimin)	Nominated	
1997	Star Awards	Top 10 Most Popular Male Artistes	—N/a	Nominated	
1998	Star Awards	Top 10 Most Popular Male Artistes	—N/a	Nominated	
1999	Star Awards	Best Supporting Actor	Wok of Life (as Zeng Nanhua)	Nominated	
1999	Star Awards	Top 10 Most Popular Male Artistes	—N/a	Nominated	
2004	Star Awards	Top 10 Most Popular Male Artistes	—N/a	Nominated	
2009	Star Awards	Best Supporting Actor	The Defining Moment (as Tang Weiye)	Nominated	
2009	Star Awards	Top 10 Most Popular Male Artistes	—N/a	Nominated	
2010	Star Awards	Best Supporting Actor	Reunion Dinner (as Liang Zhigao)	Won	
2010	Star Awards	Top 10 Most Popular Male Artistes	—N/a	Nominated	
2011	Star Awards	Top 10 Most Popular Male Artistes	—N/a	Nominated	
2012	Star Awards	Top 10 Most Popular Male Artistes	—N/a	Nominated	
2013	Star Awards	Best Supporting Actor	Pillow Talk (as Zhang Qian)	Nominated	
2013	Star Awards	Top 10 Most Popular Male Artistes	—N/a	Nominated	
2014	Asian Television Awards	Best Actor in a Supporting Role	Served H.O.T. (as Zeng Jianwan)	Nominated	
2014	Star Awards	Top 10 Most Popular Male Artistes	—N/a	Nominated	
2015	Star Awards	Best Supporting Actor	In The Name Of Love (as Wang Weiguo)	Nominated	
2015	Star Awards	Top 10 Most Popular Male Artistes	—N/a	Nominated	
2016	Star Awards	Top 10 Most Popular Male Artistes	—N/a	Nominated	
2017	Asian Television Awards	Best Actor in a Supporting Role	Trapped Minds (as Felix Tan)	Won	
2017	Star Awards	Top 10 Most Popular Male Artistes	—N/a	Nominated	
2018	Star Awards	Best Evergreen Artiste	—N/a	Nominated	
2018	Star Awards	Top 10 Most Popular Male Artistes	—N/a	Nominated	
2019	Star Awards	Top 10 Most Popular Male Artistes	—N/a	Won	
2021	Star Awards	Best Evergreen Artiste	—N/a	Nominated	
2021	Star Awards	Top 10 Most Popular Male Artistes	—N/a	Nominated	
2022	Star Awards	Best Supporting Actor	My Star Bride (as Chung Yongnian)	Nominated	
2022	Star Awards	Best Evergreen Artiste	—N/a	Nominated	
2022	Star Awards	Top 10 Most Popular Male Artistes	—N/a	Nominated	
2023	Star Awards	Best Supporting Actor	Your World in Mine (as Ang Heng Wang)	Nominated	
2023	Star Awards	Best Evergreen Artiste	—N/a	Nominated	
2023	Star Awards	Top 10 Most Popular Male Artistes	—N/a	Nominated	
2024	Star Awards	Best Supporting Actor	Till the End (as Li Zhiyin)	Nominated	
2024	Star Awards	Top 10 Most Popular Male Artistes	—N/a	Nominated	
