= Reach for the Skies (TV series) =

Singapore TV series

- Also known as: Hope is Here (天天有希望)
- 不平凡的平凡
- Genre: Family; Romance; Dramedy; Socio-Drama
- Written by: Phang Kai Yee; Lim Gin Lam
- Directed by: Lim Mee Nah; Qiu Jian Ting; Lin Mingzhe; Martin Chan; Foo Seng Peng; Oh Liangcai; Png Keh Hock; Gao Shu Yi
- Starring: Bryan Wong; Kym Ng; Pan Lingling; Yao Wenlong; Joey Swee; Zhang Zhenhuan; He Yingying
- Opening theme: 和你交换你的不安 by The Freshman
- Ending theme: 微笑向暖 by Le Sheng & Ruth Kueo
- Country of origin: Singapore
- Original languages: Mandarin, with some English dialogue
- No. of episodes: 150

Production
- Executive producer: Leong Lye Lin 梁来玲

Original release
- Network: Mediacorp Channel 8
- Release: 2 April – 29 October 2018

Related
- Life Less Ordinary; Jalan Jalan

Reach For The Skies (Chinese: 不平凡的平凡) is a 150-episode drama series produced by Mediacorp Channel 8. It stars Bryan Wong, Kym Ng, Pan Lingling, Yao Wenlong, Joey Swee, Zhang Zhenhuan and He Yingying as the cast of this series.

The show replaced the second half of the 7.00 pm drama timeslot, airing weekdays from April 4, 2018, 7.30 pm to 8.00 pm on weekdays making it the sixth long-form half-hour drama airing together with news-current affairs programme Hello Singapore at 6.30pm.

== Casts ==
- Chen Shucheng as Fang Shouyi 方守义 or Uncle Yi (义叔) Chen portrays as Fang Shouyi, a gang leader.
- Bryan Wong as Fang Zixin 方自新 Wong portrays as Fang Zixin, Fang Shouyi's son, who is an ex-convict and a Hope Training Centre's instructor.

=== Hong (Biao) Family ===
| Cast | Role | Description |
|---|---|---|
| Zhu Houren 朱厚仁 | Hong Biao 洪标 | Main Villain but repentant Uncle Biao (标叔): Zhu Xiuxia's husband; Hong Dacai, Hong Qianbei & Hong Duoduo's father.; Liu Mali's father-in-law; Hong Baihui's grandfather; Hong Koufu's adoptive Father; suffered from dementia |
| Hong Huifang 洪慧芳 | Zhu Xiuxia 朱秀霞 | Supporting Villain but repentant: Hong Biao's wife; Hong Dacai, Hong Qianbei & Hong Duoduo's mother; Liu Mali's mother-in-law; Hong Baihui's grandmother; Hong Koufu's adoptive mother; (Deceased - Episode 125) |
| Kym Ng 鍾琴 | Hong Dacai 洪大彩 | Big Sweep (大彩), Tom Boy (男人婆), Ahlian Bimbo; Teenage Version portrayed by Shelia Tan (陈玮甜): Hong Biao and Zhu Xiuxia's eldest daughter; Hong Qianbei and Hong Duoduo's elder sister; Hong Baihui's aunty; Tang Weiye's ex-girlfriend; In love with Fang Zixin; Zhong Ling's best friend; Hong Koufu's adoptive elder sister |
| Yao Wenlong 姚彣隆 | Hong Qianbei 洪千杯 | Teenage Version portrayed by Huang Shengxiong (黄圣雄); Drunkard (酒鬼): Liu Mali's husband; Hong Baihui's father; Hong Biao and Zhu Xiuxia's eldest son; Hong Dacai's first younger brother; Hong Duoduo's elder brother; Hong Koufu's first adoptive elder brother; In love with Lin Feina |
| Joey Swee 徐绮 | Liu Mali 刘玛丽 | Teenage Version portrayed by Audrey Soh (苏怡妃); Lazy Bum (懒惰性), Li Li (丽丽): Hong Qianbei's wife; Hong Baihui's mother; Hong Biao and Zhu Xiuxia's daughter-in-law; Hong Dacai and Hong Duoduo's sister-in-law; Lin Feina's ex-best friend and rival in love; Suffered from Hypersomnia & Miscarriage |
| Joey Swee 徐绮 | Mali's mother 玛丽妈 | Liu Mali's mother; Hong Qianbei's mother-in-law; Hong Baihui's grandmother |
| Zhang Zhenhuan 张震寰 | Hong Duoduo 洪多多 | Toto/4D (多多); Younger Version portrayed by Brayden Koh (许容亨): Hong Biao and Zhu Xiuxia's youngest son; Hong Dacai and Hong Qianbei's younger brother; Hong Baihui's uncle; Xu Jingchu's ex-boyfriend; Xu Jingxin's love interest; Hong Koufu's adoptive second elder brother; Suffered from Muteness but recovered |
| Chen Xi | Hong Koufu 洪口福 | Supporting Villain but repentant: Hong Biao and Zhu Xiuxia's adoptive son; Hong Dacai, Hong Qianbei and Hong Duoduo's adoptive youngest brother; Hong Baihui's cousin; Zhang Xiaochun's best friend/ boyfriend |
| Shannen Tan 陈萱恩 | Hong Baihui 洪百惠 | Hong Qianbei and Liu Mali's daughter; Hong Biao and Zhu Xiuxia's granddaughter; Hong Dacai and Hong Duoduo's niece; Hong Koufu's adoptive niece |

=== Wu (Simei) Family ===
| Cast | Role | Description |
|---|---|---|
| Catherine Sng 孙于惠 | Wu Simei 吴四妹 | Supporting Villain but repented Aunty Maggie (Maggie阿姨), Grandma Maggie (阿嫲Maggie), Old Granny (老太婆): Zhong Ling's mother; Wu Xiaorong's aunty; Zhang Xiaochun and Zhang Xiaocong's grandmother; Derek Lim's mother-in-law; Collaborates with Fang Shouyi to cause conflicts between Fang Zixin and Zhong Ling to cause misunderstanding between them |
| Seth Ang 翁兴昂 | Derek Lim | Lin Feina's older brother; Zhong Ling's husband; Sun Yuhui's son-in-law; Zhang Xiaochun and Zhang Xiaocong's adoptive father; Suffering from heart attack; (Deceased - long time ago) |
| Pan Lingling 潘玲玲 | Zhong Ling 钟灵 | Mentally Unstable Main Villain but repentant Classy Bimbo, Ms Chong (张小姐): Hope Training Centre's owner; Wu Simei's daughter; Derek Lim's wife; Zhang Xiaochun and Zhang Xiaocong's mother; Lin Feina's sister-in-law; Fang Zixin's ex-girlfriend; Suffered from depression but turned out to be fake |
| He Ailing 何爱玲 | Wu Xiaorong 吴孝蓉 | Grimp Face (无笑容): Hope Training Centre's receptionist; Zhong Ling's cousin; Wu Simei's niece |
| Sheila Sim 沈琳宸 | Lin Feina 林菲娜 | Mentally Unstable Villain but repentant Fiona Lim, Mistress (小三); Teenage Version portrayed by Jasmine Sim (沈家玉): Hope Training Centre's instructor (Fine-Art Culinary); Derek Lim's younger sister; Zhong Ling's sister-in-law; Zhang Xiaochun and Zhang Xiaocong's adoptive aunt; Hong Qianbei's ex-mistress/ affair/ girlfriend/ first love; Liu Mali's ex-best friend & rival in love |
| Fang Rong 傅芳榕 | Zhang Xiaochun 张晓纯 | Main Villain but repentant: Zhong Ling's daughter; Derek Lim's adoptive daughter; Wu Simei's granddaughter; Lin Feina's niece; Hong Koufu's best friend/ girlfriend |
| Damien Teo 张值豪 | Zhang Xiaocong 张晓聪 | Zhong Ling's son; Derek Lim's adoptive son; Wu Simei's grandson; Zhang Xiaochun's younger brother; Lin Feina's nephew |
| Hasisha Nazir | Minti | Semi-Villain: Wu Simei's ex-family maid; (Sent back to her own country in Episode 72 after being discovered pouring urine into Wu Simei's food) |

=== Supporting Casts ===
| Cast | Role | Description |
|---|---|---|
| Brandon Wong 黄炯耀 | Zhuo Zhiliang 卓志良 | 'Mentally Unstable Patient; Albert Toh: Hope Training Centre's instructor (Information & Communication Technology); Zhong Ling's affair/lover (one-sided love); Wu Xiaorong's love interest |
| Cassandra See 薛淑珊 | Bona | Mentally Unstable Villain: Huang Tianci's ex-wife; Hong Biao's mistress |
| He Yingying 何盈莹 | Xu Jingchu 许婧初 | Mark Xu's elder daughter; Xu Jingxin's elder twin sister and rival-in-love; Hong Duoduo's ex-girlfriend; Suffered from Acquired Immune Deficiency Syndrome (AIDS); (Deceased - in Episode 135 mentioned by Xu Jingxin) |
| He Yingying 何盈莹 | Xu Jingxin 许婧心 | Mark Xu's younger daughter; Xu Jingchu's younger twin sister and rival-in-love; In Iove with Hong Duoduo |
| Wang Yuqing 王昱清 | Huang Tianci 黄天赐 | (Fake) Tang Weiye (假 唐伟业): Bona's ex-husband; Hong Biao's rival in love; In love with Hong Dacai |
| Rayson Tan 陈泰铭 | Tang Weiye 唐伟业 | Tang Wee Giap; Teenage Version Portrayed by Royston Ong (王俊雄): Hong Dacai's ex-boyfriend; Hong Koufu's father |

=== Cameo appearance ===
| Cast | Role | Description |
|---|---|---|
| Zoe Tay 郑惠玉 | Herself | |
| Paige Chua 蔡琦慧 | Herself | |
| Hong Ling 洪凌 | Herself | |
| Kelvin Soon 孙文海 | Trainer Sun 孙导师 | Hope Training Centre's instructor (Music & Singing) |
| Leron Heng 王丽蓉 | Angela | Zhang Xiaochun's best friend |
| Sherraine Law 罗翊绮 | Rowena | Zhang Xiaochun's best friend |
| Cansen Goh 吴开深 | Ah Fan 阿凡 | Ex-convict; Fang Zixin's best friend |
| Tan Junsheng 陈俊生 | Kayden | Zhang Xiaocong's classmate |
| Eelyn Kok 郭蕙雯 | Annie | Villain but repented: Lin Feina's rival in love |
| Brendon Kuah 柯迪宏 | Keith | Villain |
| Vincent Tee 池素宝 | Liu Shaopin 刘少品 | In love with Wu Simei; Suffered from urinary incontinence |
| Johnny Ng 黄家强 | Huang Deming 黄德明 | Uncle Deming (德明叔): Alex Wong's son; Wu Simei's love interest; Suffered from stroke; (Deceased in Episode 83) |
| Benjamin Heng 王智国 | Alex Wong | Villain: Huang Deming's son |
| Fu Ziyao 符之耀 | Jeremy | CK1998: In love with Hong Baihui |
| Larry Low 刘龙伟 | Nex | Villain; Teenage Version portrayed by Wauren Beh (马纬翰): Hong Qianbei's ex-secondary classmate; Boss of a security office |
| Zhu Xiufeng 朱秀凤 | Grandma Tenant 房东婆婆 | Hong Duoduo and Xu Qingchu's tenant; Nick's mother |
| Wallace Ang 洪圣安 | Nick | Semi-Villain but repented: Grandma Tenant's son |
| Gong Jianli 龔庭立 | | A Psychologist |
| Tan Xiangrong 陈祥荣 | Jimmy | Lin Feina's friend; A Lawyer |
| Joyce Ng 黄琬婷 | Lia | Main Villain: Neil, Edison and Justin's best friend; Pretended to be Zhang Xiaochun and drugged her and collaborated with Neil, Edison and Justin |
| Christian Lamprecht | Robert | Liu Mali's blind date |
| Xavier Ong 王胜宇 | Neil | Supporting Villain: Lia, Edison and Justin's best friend; (Arrested in Episode 89) |
| Henry Low 刘旭涛 | Edison | Supporting Villain: Lia, Neil and Justin's best friend; (Arrested in Episode 89) |
| Collin Chan 陈永昌 | Justin | Supporting Villain: Lia, Neil and Edison's best friend; (Arrested in Episode 89) |
| Wang Changli 王昌黎 | Guo Li 国立 | Mei Ping's husband; Gladys' father; Hong Koufu's biological father |
| Li Xuehuai 李雪怀 | Mei Ping 美萍 | Guo Li's wife; Hong Koufu's biological mother; Gladys' mother |
| Shanice Koh 许舒宁 | Gladys | Hong Koufu's biological sister |
| Gary Tan 陈毅丰 | Joshua Teng 丁协智 | Villain: Underage boy who accused Hong Kong selling alcohol to him |
| Joel Choo 朱哲伟 | Kris/ Chris | Xu Jingxin's friend |
| Lin Zhiqiang 林志强 | Mr Lim | Gain City's manager; Hong Qianbei's boss |

== Original Sound Track (OST) ==
| No. | Song | Performer(s) |
|---|---|---|
| 1) | 和你交换你的不安 (Opening Theme Song) | The Freshman 插班生 |
| 2) | 微笑向暖 (Song For Xu Jingchu & Hong Duoduo) | 乐声 Le Sheng & 魏妙如 Ruth Kueo |

== Awards and nominations ==
| Accolades | Nominees | Category | Result |
|---|---|---|---|
| Star Awards 2019 | The Freshman 插班生 | Best Theme Song 最佳主题曲《(和你交换你的不安)》 | Nominated |
