= Michelle Wong =

Singaporean actress

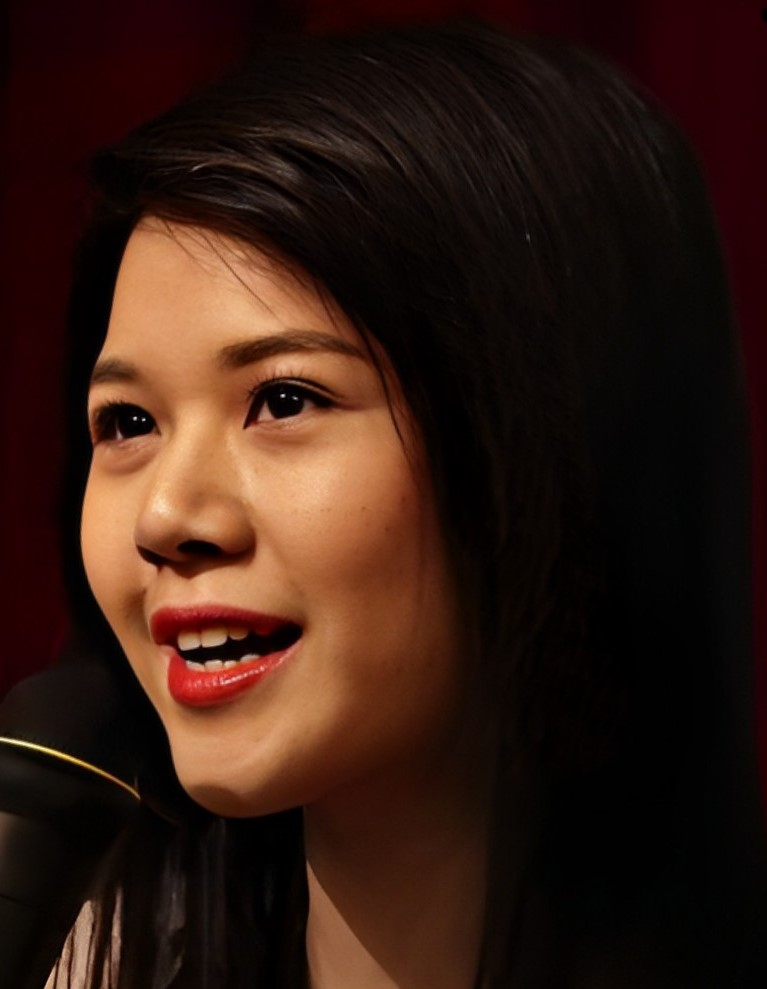
- Wong in September 2017
- Born: Singapore
- Education: Anglo-Chinese Junior College
- Alma mater: Monash University
- Occupations: Actress; host; model
- Years active: 2005−present

Chinese name
- Traditional Chinese: 黃怡靈
- Simplified Chinese: 黄怡灵
- Hanyu Pinyin: Huáng Yílíng

Michelle Wong Yi Lin is a Singaporean actress, host and model. She was a finalist in The 5 Search competition.

== Early life ==
Wong attended Anglo-Chinese Junior College, where she undertook theatre studies programme. She went on to graduate from Monash University with a Bachelor of the Arts (Communications).

== Career ==
Wong starred in several dramas starting from 2005, including Kids Central production Double Chin 2 and Heartlanders (Series 3). From 2011 to 2014, she starred in various films, such as Across the Straits, Acceptance, 3 Peas in a Pod and Woodlands, 2007. Also in 2014, Wong starred in a minor role in the film adaptation of Joker Game, released in 2015.

In 2015, Wong's big break came when she participated in The 5 Search, and emerged as one of the finalists. Since then, she was offered a Mediacorp contract and starred as one of the main cast in MediaCorp Channel 8 long-running drama Peace & Prosperity.

In 2016, she appeared in The Queen.

In 2018, she was cast in the English-language series, Code Of Law (Season 4) and also made a cameo appearance in Eat Already? 4. She had prominent roles in A Million Dollar Dream, Babies On Board and Blessings 2. She appeared in long form drama Jalan Jalan and Hello From The Other Side.

Her performance in the role of “Liu Saiwen” in Blessings 2 earned her a nomination for Best Newcomer at the 2019 Star Awards.

In 2022, she was nominated for Best Leading Female Performance – Digital in the 27th Asian Television Awards and attended the Awards in Manila.

Most recently, she won the Bronze award for Best Supporting Actress in a TV Programme/Series at the Content Asia Awards 2023.

== Filmography ==
=== Film ===
Year	Title	Role	Notes	Ref.
2011	Across the Straits	Hui		
2012	Acceptance			
2013	3 Peas in a Pod			
2014	Joker Game			
2014	UU			
2014	Woodlands, 2007	Hui Wen		
2017	Wonder Boy	Patricia "Pat" Lee		

=== Television series ===
Year	Title	Role	Notes	Ref.
2015	Life - Fear Not	Kate		
2015	Project W	Yoona		
2016	Peace & Prosperity	Huang Zixin		
2016	The Queen	Hong-dou		
2017	Faculty	Victoria Lee		
2018	Eat Already? 4	Secretary Wong		
2018	A Million Dollar Dream	Huang Qiqi		
2018	Babies On Board	Zhang Rongxuan		
2018	Blessings 2	Liu Saiwen		
2018	We The Citizens			
2018	Code Of Law (Season 4)	Miki Lee		
2019	Jalan Jalan (带你去走走)	Candy Tang Huili		
2019	Hello From The Other Side (阴错阳差)	May		
2019	My One In A Million (我的万里挑一)	Yang Yichun		
2020	Recipe of Life (味之道)	Kim		
2020	Code Of Law Forensik	Miki Lee		
2021	The Peculiar Pawnbroker (人心鉴定师)	Karis		
2021	Krono Suria	Pei Sin		
2022	After Dark 411	Chien	S2 Ep. 2	
2023	Fix My Life	Huiyun		
2023	Silent Walls	Mizuki		

=== Web series ===
Year	Title	Role	Notes	Ref.
2021	A.I Love K Drama	Tia Tan		
2022	He's Not the One	Belle		
2022	Daddy Soul Maid	Michelle		

== Discography ==
=== Compilation albums ===
Year	English title	Mandarin title
2020	MediaCorp Music Lunar New Year Album 20	裕鼠鼠纳福迎春了

== Awards and nominations ==
Year	Award	Category	Nominated work	Result	Ref
2019	Star Awards	Best Newcomer	Blessings 2 (as Liu Saiwen)	Nominated	
2021	Star Awards	Top 10 Most Popular Female Artistes	—N/a	Nominated	
2022	27th Asian Television Awards	Best Leading Female Performance – Digital	He's Not the One (as Belle)	Nominated	
2023	Content Asia Awards	Best Supporting Actress in a TV Programme/Series	After Dark 411 (as Chien)	Bronze	
