= Lawrence Wong (actor) =

Singaporean actor (born 1988)

- Born: 5 August 1988 (age 38); Johor Bahru, Malaysia
- Occupations: Actor; singer; model; presenter
- Years active: 2009–present
- Agent: Wow Star Pictures (2016–present)
- Notable work: Television series: 2018: Story of Yanxi Palace; 2020: Girlfriend; 2020: One Boat One World; Film: 2013: Gloryfying Love; 2017: My Fantasy Diary The Idolator's Plan; Telemovie: 2009: The Promise; 2016: Double Trouble Love
- Awards: 2018 Golden Oak Awards: Most Promising Actor in Asia; 2018 Golden Angel Awards: Best Actor in a Supporting Role; 2018 StarHub Night of Stars: StarHub Breakthrough Star Award; See link for more details: Film&TV Awards, Media and Entertainment Platform Awards

Chinese name
- Traditional Chinese: 王冠逸
- Simplified Chinese: 王冠逸
- Hanyu Pinyin: Wáng Guànyì
- Jyutping: Wong4 Gun1 Jat6
- Hokkien POJ: Ông Koan-i̍t
- Tâi-lô: Ông Kuan-i̍t

Lawrence Wong Koon-Yat (born 5 August 1988) is a Malaysian-born Singaporean actor. After his role in Story of Yanxi Palace (2018), Wong was ranked 35th in the list of most influential artistes in China.

== Early life ==
Wong was born on 5 August 1988 in Johor Bahru, Johor, Malaysia to a Singaporean father. Wong studied at RMIT University in Australia, and graduated with a degree in mass communications. Wong acquired Singaporean citizenship c. 2016.

== Career ==
In his early years as an actor since 2002, Wong's early roles were limited to minor roles in dramas. Wong had also portrayed real-life convicted murderer Lee Chor Pet, who kidnapped and murdered a rich businessman's teenage son in Singapore in 1968 and later executed in 1973, for which Lee's case was re-enacted and featured in Singapore's local crime show True Files.

Wong's notable minor roles in his career came from dramas like Three Wishes, 118, The Dream Job and Zero Calling .

In The Promise, a Channel U telemovie, he played a rebellious teen who falls in love with an intellectually-disabled girl. Lawrence was nominated for "Favourite Male Character" at the Star Awards 2010.

In 2016, he signed on with a Chinese management company run by Chinese actress Qin Lan and was selected for a role in Love And Passion, a remake of the 1982 TVB classic.

He was cast in Story of Yanxi Palace which aired in 2018, as Hai Lan Cha, for which he received two international awards.

Wong appeared in My One in a Million on Mediacorp Channel 8 in a lead role, replacing Aloysius Pang who died in a military accident.

== Filmography ==
=== Television series ===
Year	Title	Role	Notes	Ref
2002	Moulmein High 3	Kim Loong (student)	14 years old in 2002?	
2002	Living with Lydia	Bellboy	Season 2; episode 1	
2004	True Files	Lee Chor Pet		
2009	Your Hand in Mine (想握你的手)	Ben		
2010	Goodnight DJ 2 (声空感应2之标本)	Li Mingguo	Episode 1 & 2	
2010	Tribulations of Life	Yang Disheng		
2011	A Time To Embrace (追影·筑梦)	Yang Jicheng Jensen		
2011	Secrets for Sale	Guo Anjin		
2011	Dark Sunset	Chen An Bang		
2011	Model à la Mode (天幕迷情)	Jacky Chen		
2013	Art of Love: Picture Perfect (心·艺之写真情缘)	Liu Qingyun		
2013	In Laws (男婚女嫁)	Zheng Qijian		
2014	In Laws 2 (男婚女嫁2)	Zheng Qijian		
2014	118	Zhang Jiabao		
2014	Three Wishes	Junhao		
2014	Zero Calling	Ben		
2015	My Boss Yes Sir My Boss	Ron		
2015	3 cm Short (差3公分想爱你)	Peng Zixiang		
2015	Term of Endearment (如何说再见 - 单元四：如何说再见之1314))	Lawrence		
2015	Echoes of Time (星月传奇)	Dai Mian'en / Lai Teck		
2016	My Twins Lovers (双子情人)	Yu Houming / Yu Houqin		
2016	The Dream Job	Qiu Zhiying		
2018	Story of Yanxi Palace	Hai Lancha		
2019	My One in a Million (我的万里挑一)	Yang Dingyi		
2020	Girlfriend (楼下女友请签收)	Ye Feimo		
2021	One Boat One World (海洋之城)	Wang Ziyang		
2023	Stand or Fall (闪耀的她)	He Yifei		
TBA	The Ferryman Legends of Nanyang (灵魂摆渡·南洋传说)	Xia Dongqing		
TBA	Love and Passion (万水千山总是情)	Zhuang Tianya		
TBA	Ping Yao Zhuan			

=== Film ===
Year	Title	Role	Notes	Ref
2007	Men in White	Ah Huat		
2011	The Promise (向日葵的约定)	Chen Wenyuan	Telemovie	
2012	Wiedersehen in Malaysia	Johan	Telemovie	
2012	Medic Force (幸福边缘)	St. John ambulanceman	Short film	
2013	Judgement Day	Ah Song		
2013	Lucky Bowl 1 (聚宝盆续集)	Ke Laosan	Telemovie	
2013	Lucky Bowl 2 (聚宝盆前传)	Ke Laosan	Telemovie	
2013	Double Trouble Love (我心向明月)	Lawrence / Ah Sen	Telemovie	
2014	Gloryfying Love (玩Cool青春)	Heng Zai		
2014	Spring Chorus (忆起回家)	Wenbin	Telemovie	
2016	In the Room	Hotel guest		
2016	Summer's Desire (泡沫之夏)	Song Yamin		
2016	The Love Machine	Andy	Telemovie	
2017	My Fantasy Diary The Idolator's Plan (少女的奇幻日记之追星计划)	Xue Xiansheng		
2018	Super APP (超级APP)	Han Chen		
2019	Undercover Punch and Gun (潜行者)	Jack		
2022	Reunion Dinner	Chaoyang		

=== Music video appearances ===
Year	English title	Chinese title	Performer(s)
2011	"Lian Wu Zhi"	恋物志	Renee Li Yun
2014	"Mei Yi Ci Lian Ai"	每一次恋爱	Wen Yin Liang

=== Show host ===
Year	English title	Chinese title	Notes
2009	Shi Jie Dan Wan	世界弹丸	-
2011	8Style	时代达人	Fashion
2012	From Bishan To Beijing	不到长城非好汉	Travel
2013	Listen To The World Season 1	聆听世界第一季	Humanities
2014	Listen To The World Season 2	聆听世界第二季	Humanities
2014	Good Man, Good Food Ep10	好男人，好料理	Food

== Discography ==
=== Album ===
Release date	Album title	Type	Album track
1 May 2013	Shallow Love	Album	1. Shallow Love 浅浅; 2. Wan Gu Qing Chun 顽固青春; 3. Ai Shi Zen Me Yi Hui Shi 爱是怎么一回事; 4. Hua Tong 花童
8 February 2017	Lawrence Album of the Same Name	Album	1. Faith Education 信教育; 2. Hi & Bye; 3. Shi Ni Ba Wo Bian Cheng Zhe Yang 是你把我变成这样; 4. Hi & Bye 信教育 (Club Mix); 5. Hi & Bye (Rave Party Mix); 6. Faith Education 信教育 (Hip Hop Chillout Mix)

=== Singles ===
Release date	English title	Chinese title	Notes
2018-03-13	Po Jie Ai Qing De Mi Yu	破解爱情的密语	(Film "Super APP" Theme Song) feat. Qin Lan, Included in Da Hao Qing Nian Single Album
2018-08-25	Da Hao Qing Nian	大好青年	Single Album
2020-01-01	Yu Shi	于是	HunanTV Series "Girlfriend Sub-Theme

=== Music video ===
Year	English title	Chinese title	Director	Notes
2013	Shallow Love	浅浅	Leroy Low	Included In Album Of Shallow Love
2017	Faith Education	信教育	Vernon Ong	Included In Lawrence Album Of The Same Name
2017	Hi & Bye	-	Chuan Looi	Included In Lawrence Album Of The Same Name
2017	Shi Ni Ba Wo Bian Cheng Zhe Yang	是你把我变成这样	Vernon Ong	Included In Lawrence Album Of The Same Name, NTV7 TV Series "3cm Short" Ending Theme
2018	Po Jie Ai Qing De Mi Yu	破解爱情的密语	-	"Super App"Film Theme Song
2018	Da Hao Qing Nian	大好青年	Chuan Looi	-
2018	Yu Shi	于是	-	HunanTV Series"Girlfriend Sub-Theme

=== Endorsements ===
Year	Brand	Type	Country
2017	Citroën DS 4 Crossback	Brand Ambassador	Singapore
2018– 2021	Montblanc	Friend Of The Brand	Malaysia, Singapore and China
2019	Trip.com	Ambassador	Singapore
2020	iQIYI	Ambassador	International

== Awards and nominations ==
=== Film and television ===
Year	Award	Category	Nominated work	Role	Result	Ref
2010	2010 Star Awards	Favourite Male Character	The Promise	Chen Wenyuan	Nominated	-
2013	18th Asian Television Awards	Best Actor	In Laws	Zheng Qijian	Nominated	-
2014	3rd Golden Awards	Best Supporting Actor	Lucky Bowl 1	Ke Laosan	Nominated	-
2018	2018Asian-American TV&Film Festival Golden Oak Awards Ceremony	Most Promising Actor in Asia	-	-	Won	
2018	2018Chinese American TV Festival "Golden Angel Awards" Ceremony	Best Actor in a Supporting Role	Story of Yanxi Palace	Hai Lancha	Won	
2018	2018 StarHub Night of Stars	StarHub Breakthrough Star Award	-	-	Won	

=== Media and entertainment platform ===
Year	Award	Category	Country	Result	Ref
2018	2018 Fashion Power	Annual Topical Male Artist	China	Won	
2018	2018 Bazaar Jewelry Award	Annual Most Popular Jewelry Star	China	Won	
2018	OnlyLady2018 Fashion Award	Fashion Potential Male Star	China	Won	
2019	2018LikeTCCAsia	The 100 Most Handsome Asia Faces Rank No.91	China	Won	
