= Reunion Dinner (TV series) =

- 团圆饭
- Genre: Chinese New Year; Family
- Created by: Ang Eng Tee 洪荣狄
- Written by: Ang Eng Tee 洪荣狄
- Directed by: Chia Mien Yang 谢敏洋 张庆良; Wong Foon Hwee 黄芬菲; Lim Mee Nah 林美娜
- Starring: Chen Liping; Wang Yuqing; Chen Hanwei; Patricia Mok; Kym Ng; Alan Tern; Zhu Houren
- Opening theme: 新生活 (A New Life) by Mi Lu Bing
- Country of origin: Singapore
- Original languages: Mandarin, some English dialogues

Production
- Producer: Soh Bee Lian 苏美莲
- Running time: approx. 45 minutes

Original release
- Network: MediaCorp Channel 8
- Release: 6 January – 3 February 2009

Related
- Happy Family (2010); Prosperity (2011); Reunion Dinner (2022 Chinese New Year Movie)

Reunion Dinner (Chinese: 团圆饭) is a Singaporean Chinese drama which was telecasted on Singapore's free-to-air channel, MediaCorp Channel 8. It stars Chen Liping, Wang Yuqing, Chen Hanwei, Patricia Mok, Kym Ng, Alan Tern and Zhu Houren as the casts of the series. It made its debut on 6 January 2009 and ended on 3 February 2009. This drama serial consists of 20 episodes, and was screened on every weekday night at 9:00 pm.

Due to the series' heavy Chinese New Year theme, it was broadcast during the Chinese New Year season for 2009.

The series is partially sponsored by the Media Development Authority of Singapore.

== Plot ==
Reunion Dinner reflects on the plight of families in the midst of inflation as costs soar and wallets shrink. The reunion dinner on Chinese New Year's Eve and Chinese New Year holds exceptional importance to the Chinese as it signifies the bond of the family. Amidst mounting tension, marriage woes and family problems, the heatlanders in the drama exhaust their means to ensure that their families are reunited to share that very significant and heart-warming reunion dinner together.

== Cast ==
=== Liang Family (梁家) ===
| Cast | Role | Description |
|---|---|---|
| Chen Liping (陈莉萍) | Ah Ping (阿萍) | A 43-year-old housewife, she is known as the "Iron Lady" (女铁人), maintaining the overwhelming demands of a family. Her husband, Liang Tianhua (portrayed by Wang Yuqing) works in a low-paying job, and as a result, Ah Ping has to bake pastries to supplement her family's income. In addition to the family, she also has to take care of her elderly father-in-law, who has dementia. When her husband lost his job, the burden on her became even greater, and she began to break down. |
| Wang Yuqing (王昱清) | Liang Tianhua (梁天华) | The husband of Ah Ping. A weak-willed man who works in a low-paying job. He has worked in the same job for 30 years, and not once did he ask for a raise, resulting in his salary still being S$3,000 per month. He also shrugs off unreasonable requests, making him a small and nearly invisible figure in his company. |
| Zhu Houren (朱厚任) | Liang Zhigao (梁志高) | A former police officer, he retired some years ago, and now has Dementia. Despite forgetting about almost everything, his memories of his police days are still pristine, resulting in hims still thinking that he is a police officer, constantly arresting people for various crimes. |
| Ya Hui (雅慧) | Liang Meiqi (梁美琪) | The eldest daughter of the Liang family, she is a university student who is preparing to study abroad, she is relying on her scholarship and giving tutoring lessons to lessen her family's burden of sending her overseas. However, she fears that she might be pregnant, after she was intoxicated at a party with her classmates, and woke up next to a man she doesn't know. |
| Koh Zhengning (许政宁) | Liang Meihui (梁美慧) | A first year Junior College student, she has a liberal mind, which created controversies. She once created a public furore when she was caught being intimate with her boyfriend in public, resulting in public complaints to her Junior College. |

=== Liu Family (刘家) ===
| Cast | Role | Description |
|---|---|---|
| Chen Hanwei (陈汉伟) | Liu Jiachang (刘家昌) | A plumber, Jiachang is also a gambling addict, frequently losing his salary to the gambling table, as well as running up huge gambling debts. His wife, who is normally tolerating of her husband's gambling addiction, left the family and ran away after Jiachang lost a lot of money in gambling, resulting in the family not having enough money to buy rice to eat in the New Year. Realizing what his addiction has done, he vowed to change for the good, and went out to look for his wife. He got into legal trouble instead, and was detained by the police. |
| Patricia Mok (莫小玲) | Lin Fangfang (林芳芳) | Wife of Liu Jiachang. A baker, and she usually lets her children take bread from her store. She left her family after her husband lost so much money that her family cannot have a decent meal for the New Year. In order to earn as much money in the shortest possible time, she worked as a bar lady to earn extra money. |
| Jerald Tan (陈杰乐) | Liu Qiangqiang (刘强强) | The eldest son and middle child among the siblings. Sisi is older than him, Yaya is younger than him. He is 1 year younger than Sisi, and 1 year older than Yaya. He is addicted to video games, and can be seen with a black PSP in hand in many scenes. |
| Charmaine Sew (箫芷莹) | Liu Sisi (刘思思) | The eldest child and older daughter among the siblings. Both Qiangqiang and Yaya are younger than her. She is 1 year older than Qiangqiang, and 2 years older than Yaya. She neglects her studies, and always goes online to chat with others. only with her parents’ disappearance did she turned around, and began to shoulder the burden of taking care of her brother and sister. |
| Regene Lim (林咏谊) | Liu Yaya (刘牙牙) | The youngest child and younger daughter among the siblings. Both Sisi and Qiangqiang are older than her. She is 2 years younger than Sisi, and 1 year younger than Qiangqiang. She is academically inclined, and very cunning. Upon learning of her parents’ separation, she tried to unite them together, just in time for the new year. |
| Chen Peijing (陈佩菁) | Fang's Mother (芳母) | The mother of Lin Fangfang, she never remarried after her husband's death, and dresses trendily. She urged her daughter to get a divorce. However, she is seen having an affair with Ah Gang (Wang Le) |

=== Wang Family (王家) ===
| Cast | Role | Description |
|---|---|---|
| Hu Wensui (胡问遂) | Wang Hao (王浩) | A father from China, he took his son to Singapore to further his studies, while his wife, who worked in a high-level positing in a multinational corporation in China, remained there to further her career. In order to reduce his wife's burden, Hao, who was once a professional swimmer, taught swimming to supplement her income. However, he is a bit miffed that his wife did not send him money for air tickets back to China, so that the entire family can spend the New Year together in China. |
| Wang Huajing (王华婧) | Li Tong (李彤 | A high level worker in a multinational corporation in China, she is the wife of Wang Hao. Her intelligence and ambition led to rumours that she "slept" her way up (having affairs with her supervisors), which led to a marriage crisis for her. |
| Xiong Tianyang (熊天扬) | Wang Jie (王杰) | The only child of the Wangs, he is academically inclined, and under the strict supervision of his father, Hao Jie excels in school, and improved his English significantly. |

=== Hu Family (胡家) ===
| Cast | Role | Description |
|---|---|---|
| Liang Tian (梁田) | Uncle Laksa (叻沙叔) | Father of Hu Daxiong, he operates a Laksa stall along with his wife (hence the name), becoming a moderately famous Laksa vendor. He always wanted to teach Daxiong how to make Laksa, but Daxiong just shrugged it off. His fiery tempers led to arguments between him and Daxiong. |
| Zhu Xiufeng (朱秀凤) | Auntie Laksa (叻沙嫂) | An elderly woman, she sells Laksa along with her husband (hence the name). Working for decades meant that she has many medical problems. Still, she thinks she will rest only when she is lowered into a coffin.: Banana (Portrayed by Kym Ng (鐘琴)- The owner of the apartment flat where Wang Hao rented a room. She was a secondary school classmate of Lin Fangfang, and never studied beyond secondary school. In an effort to support her lazy husband, Hu Daxiong, she worked as a supermarket promoter and a beer lady. The income was great, until competition from China came. She decided then to train herself, in an effort to better compete with the newcomers. |
| Alan Tern (唐育书) | Hu Daxiong (胡达雄) | Although he graduated from a university, he does not want to work, and only wants to enjoy life. He would resign a few days after starting a new job every single time, and his business ventures would fail. He took over his father's Laksa stall, but ran it to the ground through mismanagement. |

== Reception ==
Reunion Dinner was widely applauded for its script and also its realistic depiction of everyday Singaporean life. In terms of viewership numbers, it was also a considerable ratings success. Many credit this success for the veteran cast led by Chen Liping and Wang Yuqing. Veteran actor Zhu Houren was widely praised for his performance as a demented former police officer and his character's catchphrase "我是警察!" (I am the Police!) was popular with younger audiences. The other dramas nominated for Best Drama Series and Best Theme Songs are Together, Housewives' Holiday, Perfect Cut 2 & Reunion Dinner

Average viewership for each episode is 1,027,000.

=== Accolades ===
| Organisation | Year | Category | Nominee(s) | Result | Ref. |
|---|---|---|---|---|---|
| Star Awards | 2010 | Young Talent Award | Regene Lim 林詠谊 | Won | |
| Star Awards | 2010 | Young Talent Award | Jerald Tan 陈杰乐 | Nominated | |
| Star Awards | 2010 | Best Screenplay | Ang Eng Tee 洪荣狄 | Won | |
| Star Awards | 2010 | Best Actress | Chen Liping | Won | |
| Star Awards | 2010 | Best Supporting Actor | Zhu Houren | Won | |
| Star Awards | 2010 | Best Drama Serial | —N/a | Nominated | |
