= Peace & Prosperity =

Singaporean long-running TV series

- 富贵平安
- Genre: Family; Romance; Medical; Drama; Socio-Drama
- Written by: Ng Kah Huay; Ang Chee Chuan; Goh Chwee Chwee
- Directed by: Fu Zhi Bing; Oh Liang Cai; Gao Shu Yi; Zhang Huiying; Chen Bang Yuan; Gao Xiu Hui
- Starring: Xiang Yun; Desmond Tan; Belinda Lee; Tong Bingyu; Dawn Yeoh; Tracy Lee; Julie Tan; Michelle Wong; Zhang Wei
- Opening theme: 人生来往 by Desmond Ng
- Ending theme: 1) 我愛所以我在 by Cheng Ze; 2) 兩個人 by Febe Huang; 3) 念 by Sherraine Law
- Country of origin: Singapore
- Original languages: Mandarin, with some English dialogue
- No. of episodes: 170

Production
- Producer: Wong Kuang Yong 黄光荣

Original release
- Network: Mediacorp Channel 8
- Release: April 4 – November 28, 2016

Peace & Prosperity (Chinese: 富贵平安) ran for 170 episodes series produced by Mediacorp Channel 8. It stars Xiang Yun, Desmond Tan, Belinda Lee, Tong Bingyu, Dawn Yeoh, Tracy Lee, Julie Tan, Michelle Wong and Zhang Wei as the casts in this series. The series wrapped on 22 August 2016, being the last drama series filmed in Mediacorp’s former Caldecott Broadcast Centre Number 6 film studio.

The show replaced the second half of the 7.00 pm drama timeslot, airing weekdays from April 4, 2016, 7.30 pm to 8.00 pm on weekdays making it the 3rd long form half hour drama airing together with news-current affairs programme Hello Singapore at 6.30pm.

== Plot ==
Peace and Prosperity is centered around the lives of the Huang family who have been running a TCM (traditional Chinese medicine) clinic for three generations. The family-run business is on the search for its next successor as the young generation of Huangs are not interested in TCM and have yet to prove themselves capable of running the business. The clinic was founded by Huang Datong's father and is now operated by his daughter-in-law Shen Ping'an, who is also caring for six daughters; Ziting, Zishan, Zijun, Ziyu, Zihong and Zixin.

Shen Ping'an's vast knowledge in Chinese medicine is well known in the neighbourhood and many people show up at the hall for her medical consultation. Huang Datong's elder son, Huang Yuanhao and his wife Lin Shuzhi open a fruit stall near "Prosperity Hall", idling their days away. The only thing that motivates them is plotting Shen Ping'an's downfall so that they can get a share of ‘Prosperity Hall" for themselves. They are constantly creating trouble and distrust within the family. They have a son named Huang Zihao who is a lazy and spoilt young man. Datong does not trust them to take over "Prosperity Hall" and decides to let Ping An manage the hall. Datong is still bothered by the choice of possible successor to Ping An.

Huang Datong sponsors Yingxiong's study in traditional Chinese medicine and hopes of having him as a grandson-in-law and subsequently, his successor. Hong Yingxiong is in love with Zihong but Zihong went to New York and came back with Lan Baojie; as he still has not given up on Zihong, the show is left in a cliffhanger.

== Cast ==
=== Main cast ===
Huang Family

- Zhang Wei 张为 as Huang Datong 黄大同. Owner of Prosperity Hall, a TCM clinic.
- Li Wenhai as Huang Yuanzhe 黄元哲. Huang Datong's youngest son and deceased.
- Xiang Yun as Shen Ping'an 沈平安. Shen managed the Prosperity Hall and the main physician of the clinic.
- Belinda Lee as Huang Ziting 黄子庭. Shen's eldest daughter and works at Prosperity Hall.
- Tong Bing Yu as Huang Zishan 黄子珊. Shen's second daughter who is a doctor and the co-owner of the H&H clinic which opened opposite of Prosperity Hall.
- Dawn Yeoh as Huang Zijun 黄子君. Shen's third daughter.
  - Valere Ng as Young Huang Zijun.
- Jeffrey Xu as Lu Xiaoqiang 鹿小强. Huang Zijun's husband
- Cruz Tay 郑凯泽 as Lu Yangyang 鹿阳阳. Son of Huang Zijun and Lu Xiaoqiang
- Tracy Lee as Huang Ziyu 黄子瑜. Shen's fourth daughter.
- Julie Tan as Huang Zihong 黄子鸿. Shen's fifth daughter.
- Michelle Wong as Huang Zixin 黄子欣, Shen's sixth daughter.
- Ray Nu as Yuni, a domestic helper in the Huang Family.
- Marcus Chin as Huang Yuanhao 黄元浩. Huang Datong's eldest son and the owner of a fruit stall beside Prosperity Hall.
- Lin Meijiao 林梅娇 as Lin Shuzhi 林淑枝, Huang Yuanhao's wife.
- Shane Pow as Huang Zihao 黄子豪, Huang Yuanhao and Lin Shuzhi's son.
- Li Wenhai as Huang Yaonan 黄要男, illegitimate son of Huang Datong
- Desmond Ng as Huang Zikang 黄子康, son of Huang Yaonan
- Seraph Sun as Xu Cuihua 许翠华, Shen Ping'an's niece.
- Ben Yeo as Bryan Li, a lawyer and Huang Ziyu's former husband.

=== Hong Family ===
- Yan Bingliang as Hong Liangcai 洪良才.
- Desmond Tan as Hong Xiaochuan 洪小川 / Hong Yingxiong 洪英雄, an employee at Prosperity Hall and Huang Yuanzhe's godson.
- Ian Teng 丁翊 as Hong Liangliang 洪亮亮, Hong Yingxiong's son.

=== Yeo Family ===
- Romeo Tan as Lan Baojie 蓝宝杰, a plastic surgeon.
- Jayley Woo as Yang Meikai 杨梅开 (Megan Yeo), a manicure shop assistant.

=== Xiao Family ===
- Ling Xiao 凌霄 as Xiao Fangfang 萧方方, owner of a manicure shop.
- Yao Wenlong as Xiao Tiantian 萧天天, Xiao Fangfang's younger brother and co-owner of the manicure shop

=== Ouyang Family ===
| Cast | Role | Description |
|---|---|---|
| Priscelia Chan 曾诗梅 | Ouyang Fengying 欧阳凤英 | Auntie; Ouyang Yixiu's daughter Manicure shop assistant Xia Bingji's love intreset Aimin, Aijia & Aiguo's Mother |
| 陳見由 | Aimin 爱民 | Ouyang Fengying's younger son Ouyang Yixiu's youngest grandson |
| 林慨恩 | Aijia 爱家 | Ouyang Fengying's daughter Ouyang Yixiu's granddaughter |
| 陳家俊 | Aiguo 爱国 | Ouyang Fengying's Elder son Ouyang Yixiu's Elder grandson |
| Zhu Houren 朱厚任 | Ouyang Yixiu 欧阳一修 | Lonely Old Man (孤独老人); Ouyang Fengying's father Aimin, Aiguo and Aijia's grandfather |

=== Ho & Huang Clinic ===
| Cast | Role | Description |
|---|---|---|
| Terence Cao | He Sheng 何笙 | Dr.Ho; Huang Zishan's Partner; Huang Zishan's Love Interest; Wu Meiling's Fiancé An owner of H&H clinic |
| 葉菁廷 | Wu Meiling 吴美玲 | A reception at Ho & Huang's Clinic; He Sheng's Fiancé |
| 張翠纓 | 愛丽姐 | Another reception at Ho and Huang's Clinic |
| Guo Liang | You Yong Fa 游永发 | Dr Huat; He Sheng's Friend; Huang Zishan's Partner; He Sheng Recommended Partner for H&H Clinic |

=== Other cast ===
| Cast | Role | Description |
|---|---|---|
| David Leong 梁家豪 | Pierre Chew 周申业 | Mentally Unstable Villain; Pikachu; Xiao Tiantian's Friend; Huang Ziting's Fiancé |
| 許俊遠 | 金毛 | Gangster; Hong Yingxiong's Friend; Set up an unlicensed Fruit Store |
| Michelle Tay 鄭荔分 | 恐龙 | Gangster; Hong Yingxiong's Friend; Set up an unlicensed Fruit Store |
| Marcus Mok 莫健发 | Ryuichi Oba 大场龙一 | Villain; Obassan; Huang Zixin's Professor and Love Interest; Being investigated after accepting bribes from female students Ran away to another country Threatened Zixin to give him 5K to help him leave the country but was stopped by Ping'an |
| Shannen Tan 陈萱恩 | Ocean | Aiguo's Girlfriend; Xiaoqiang's Student; Frame Xiaoqiang for molesting her |
| Christian Lamprecht | Thomas | Ziting's Tour Guide; Ping'an's Patient Son; Ziting's Love Interest; Broke up with Ziting |
| Nick Teo | Zhao Renyi 赵仁义 | Hong Xiaochuan 洪小川; Hong Xiaochuan's substitute Huang Yuanzhe and Shen Ping An's godson Huang Ziyu's boyfriend Huang Zixin's Love Interest |
| Louis Wu 伍洛毅 | Rain | Megan 's Boyfriend; Zihao Rival In Love |

=== Cameo appearances ===
| Cast | Role | Description |
|---|---|---|
| Kenneth Chung | Xiong Wei 熊威 | Lu Xiaoqiang's Hometown Friend; Accidentally caused Zijun to miscarry Arrested - Episode 68 |
| 刘侍玫 | Xie Xian 谢娴 | Xiao Fangfang's Friend |
| Tommy Wong 王昌黎 | 阿山 | Xie Xian's Husband |
| 李冀琛 | Niu Jing 牛勁 | Villain Xiaoqiang's Hometown Friend; Run off to another country after stealing herbs from Prosperity Hall - Episode 51 |
| 盧冠耀 | Zhao Xiaoyao 赵逍遥 | A Fengshui Master that Yuanhao Hired |
| 陶櫻 | Julie | Megan's Mum Good Friend |
| 馬天凌 | 美玲父 | Meiling's Dad |
| 林倩茹 | 美玲母 | Meiling's Mum |
| 管雪梅 | 筠母 | Zhong Yunyun's Mother |
| Puan Ramesh | Ramly | Xiao Qiang's Friend |
| 小孟 | 阿拔 | Huang Zihong's Friend Uncle Richard's son |
| Rio Chan 曾佳平 | 阿弟 | Huang Zihong's Friend A Ba's wife |
| 陳毅丰 | 白兔 | Huang Zihong's Friend; Uncle Richard 's son |
| 李天樂 | Ma Yuanyuan 马圆圆 | Xiaoqiang's Friend |

=== Other Casts ===
| Cast | Role | Description |
|---|---|---|
| CKay Lim 林志强 | Xia Bingji 夏炳基 | A Resident; Loving Ouyang Fengying |
| 何愛玲 | Xia Yinhua 夏银花 | Winter Jasmine (迎春花); Huang Yuanhao's partner in singing competition Fake couple with Hong YingXiong |
| Luisa Gan 顏尔 | Wati | Adopted by an Indonesian Woman; Close Relationship with her adoptive Mother; Works hard to provide her adoptive Mother; Likes Xiao Tiantian |
| Zaliha | Mak Cik Nana | Wati's adoptive Mother |
| David Leong 梁家豪 | Pierre Chew 周申业 | Mentally Unstable Villain Pikachu; Xiao Tiantian's Friend; Huang Ziting's Fiancé; Arrested by the police - Episode 110 |
| 許俊遠 | 金毛 | Gangster; Hong Yingxiong's Friend; Set up an unlicensed Fruit Store 恐龙's Friend |
| Michelle Tay 鄭荔分 | 恐龙 | Gangster; Hong Yingxiong's Friend; Set up an unlicensed Fruit Store 金毛's Friend |
| Marcus Mok 莫健发 | Ryuichi Oba 大场龙一 | Villain; Obassan; Huang Zixin's Professor and Love Interest; Being investigated after accepting bribes from female students Ran away to another country Threatened Zixin to give him 5K to help him leave the country but was stopped by Ping'an |
| Shannen Tan 陈萱恩 | Ocean | Aiguo's Girlfriend; Xiaoqiang's Student; Frame Xiaoqiang for molesting her |
| Christian Lamprecht | Thomas | Ziting's Tour Guide; Ping'an's Patient Son; Ziting's Love Interest; Broke up with Ziting |
| Nick Teo | Zhao Renyi 赵仁义 | Hong Xiaochuan's substitute Huang Yuanzhe and Shen Ping An's godson Leaving from Singapore and back to Taiwan at Episode 152 and come back at Episode 156; Likes Huang Ziyu; Huang Zixin's Love Interest |
| Louis Wu 伍洛毅 | Rain | Megan 's Boyfriend; Zihao Rival In Love |

=== Wind Asia ===
| Cast | Role | Description |
|---|---|---|
| 苏才忠 | Sky | Boss of Wind Asia |
| Erika Tan | Zhong Yunyun 钟筠筠 | CEO of Wind Asia |
| Dylan Quek 郭景豪 | Win | Employee of Wind Asia |
| 方偉豪 | Andy | Employee of Wind Asia |

=== Deceased but mentioned ===
| Cast | Role | Description |
|---|---|---|
| Narelle Kheng | Ice 莊玉冰 | Wife of Hong Yingxiong; Mother of Liangliang; Was in close terms with Huang Zihong; Died after DUI-related accident caused by Zihong 10 years prior |

== Original Sound Track (OST) ==
| Song title | Performer |
|---|---|
| 人生来往 | Desmond Ng 黄振隆 |
| 我愛所以我在 | Cheng Ze 承泽 |
| 兩個人 | Febe Huang 秀平 |
| 念 | Sherraine Law 罗翊綺 |

== Marketing ==
- The first promotional roadshow was held at Bugis+, Civic Plaza. Artistes Xiang Yun, Desmond Tan, Julie Tan, Belinda Lee, Tong Bing Yu, Dawn Yeoh, Michelle Wong, Marcus Chin, Lin Meijiao, Terence Cao, Yao Wenlong, Ben Yeo, Jeffrey Xu, Seraph Sun, Jayley Woo and Priscelia Chan were present.
- A neighbourhood walk was conducted with artistes Zhang Wei, Xiang Yun, Desmond Tan, Romeo Tan, Tracy Lee, Dawn Yeoh, Michelle Wong, Marcus Chin, Lin Meijiao, Ben Yeo, Jeffrey Xu, Seraph Sun and Jayley Woo present.

== Awards and nominations ==
| Year | Ceremony | Category | Nominee(s) | Result | Ref |
|---|---|---|---|---|---|
| 2017 | Star Awards | London Choco Roll Happiness Award | Yao Wenlong | Nominated | |
| 2017 | Star Awards | London Choco Roll Happiness Award | Jeffrey Xu | Nominated | |
| 2017 | Star Awards | Best Supporting Actor | Jeffrey Xu | Nominated | |
| 2017 | Star Awards | Best Evergreen Artiste Award | Xiang Yun | Won | |
