= Kidnapping of Ong Beang Leck =

1968 abduction and murder of a businessman's teenage son

Ong Beang Leck
- Ong Beang Leck, the 19-year-old youth who was kidnapped and murdered
- Born: Ong Beang Leck; 1949; Singapore
- Died: 24 May 1968 (aged 19); Jurong, Singapore
- Cause of death: Murdered
- Other names: Ong Beang Siang
- Occupation: Spare parts dealer
- Employer: His father
- Known for: Kidnap and murder victim
- Parents: Ong Yew Kee (father); Teo Chin Lee (mother)

On 24 May 1968, 19-year-old Ong Beang Leck (Chinese: 王勉励; Pe̍h-ōe-jī: Ông Bián-lē), the son of a millionaire, was last seen leaving his house. His family received a call two days later, being told by the caller that Ong was kidnapped and a ransom of S$100,000 was demanded. After a second phone call in the second week of Ong's disappearance, the ransom was reduced to S$20,000 after negotiations, and it was paid for Ong's safe return. However, after the arrest of one suspect, it was established that Ong was murdered and in the midst of investigations and subsequent capture of four more suspects, Ong's decomposed body was discovered in a manhole at Jurong. Five of the suspects were charged in relation to their roles in the kidnapping and murder of the youth, with three hanged for murder while the remaining two were jailed for abetting the abduction and possession of the ransom money as well.

== Disappearance of Ong ==
On the evening of 24 May 1968, 19-year-old Ong Beang Leck, the fourth of five children (four sons and one daughter) of Ong Yew Kee, a rich Singaporean businessman, was last seen leaving his house, informing his family that he was going out but never told them where he was going. His family reported him missing after Ong failed to return home after that day.

Two days after Ong's disappearance, Ong's family received a phone call, in which the caller spoke to them in Hokkien that he had kidnapped Ong. The caller demanded a ransom of S$100,000 in exchange for Ong's safe return before he cut the call. Twelve days later, on 5 June 1968, the Ong family received a second phone call from the same caller, and after some negotiations, the ransom was reduced to S$20,000. The ransom was arranged to be dropped off at Jalan Taman, Serangoon Road. The ransom was paid, although Ong still remained missing and had not returned home.

== Discovery of Ong's death ==
Meanwhile, four days after the ransom was paid, at a rental car company, the owner noticed that one of the red cars he rented out recently was plagued with a strange smell, and after discovering a stain resembling blood under the car's floormat, he reported the matter to the police, who later confirmed that the substance found in the car was indeed blood. One of the last three persons who rented the car, 22-year-old Richard Lai Choon Seng (Chinese: 赖春成; Pe̍h-ōe-jī: Lāi Chhun-sêng; pinyin: Lài Chūnchéng), a Singaporean electrical firm owner, was questioned by the police. During interrogation, Lai remorsefully admitted that a murder took place inside the car while he was driving it. He told police that he was involved in the kidnapping of 19-year-old Ong Beang Leck, who he said was the one killed by his three accomplices inside the car. With Lai's information, the police managed to arrest one of the accomplices, 24-year-old Lee Chor Pet (also spelt Lee Choh Pet, alias Ah Peck; Chinese: 李祖壁; Pe̍h-ōe-jī: Lí Chó͘-pek), who was a Malaysian from Kulai, Johor. Lee was revealed to be a close friend of Ong, and he used to be an employee working under Ong's father.

After his arrest, Lee admitted to his involvement in the abduction of Ong, and led police to a sewage manhole at Jurong, where the police found the highly decomposed body of Ong Beang Leck, the 19-year-old kidnap victim. Although the state of decomposition was very high, Ong's father was able to recognise it as his son's after seeing the clothes last wore by Ong prior to his disappearance and death. It was known that on the day of his abduction, Ong was lured by Lee into the car after he was told that they would be hanging out with some pretty girls.

Three other suspects were later arrested for their alleged involvement in the kidnapping and death of Ong. Out of the trio, 32-year-old Lim Kim Kwee (alias Ah Tee; Chinese: 林金贵; Pe̍h-ōe-jī: Lîm Kim-kùi) and 23-year-old Ho Kee Fatt (alias Ah Aw; Chinese: 何记发; Pha̍k-fa-sṳ: Hò Ki-fat) were arrested in Malaysia by the Royal Malaysia Police and extradited back to Singapore to face charges of murder and kidnapping for ransom. A fifth man, 29-year-old Chow Sien Cheong (alias Ah Chong; Chinese: 赵秀昌; Pe̍h-ōe-jī: Tiāu Siù-chhiong; pinyin: Zhào Xìuchāng), was arrested in Singapore. Like Lee, both Lim and Ho were Malaysians, although Lim came from Penang while Ho came from Ipoh, Perak. The five men were all charged with murder.

== Trial of Lai and Cheong ==
On 28 April 1970, both Chow Sien Cheong and Richard Lai were brought to trial for charges of negotiating and possessing the ransom money. Lai and Chow, who both pleaded guilty, were spared from the murder charge.

Justice Tan Ah Tah, who presided over the sentencing trial of Lai, stated that it was a serious crime to kidnap a person and deterrence should be reflected in the sentence of those involved. Lai was sentenced to four years' imprisonment and another concurrent term of six months for the charges he faced. Chow was sentenced to three years' jail for receiving the ransom, and he had another year added to his sentence for possessing a share of the ransom.

== Murder trial of Lee, Lim and Ho ==
=== Prosecution's case ===
Lee Chor Pet, one of the three kidnappers charged with murder

Lim Kim Kwee, one of the three kidnappers charged with murder

Ho Kee Fatt, one of the three kidnappers charged with murder

On 11 May 1970, the murder trial for Ong Beang Leck's killing took place at the High Court. Due to the abolition of jury trials in January of that same year, the trial was presided by two judges Justice A V Winslow and Justice D C D'Cotta. The three defendants - Lee Chor Pet, Lim Kim Kwee and Ho Kee Fatt - pleaded not guilty to the murder charge, which was brought forward by the trial prosecutor K. S. Rajah. Should the men be found guilty of murder under Section 302 of the Penal Code, the death penalty was mandatory upon conviction, and under the Kidnapping Act, the men's second charge of kidnapping which was punishable by death or life imprisonment with caning, although this other charge was fully withdrawn in midst of the proceedings.

Chanda Singh, the forensic pathologist, was summoned to court to present his forensic report. A skeleton model was borrowed from a hospital to use as a demonstration on how Ong was killed, with Ong's shirt being put on. Singh told the court that according to the holes and torn areas on the shirt, it was deduced that the fatal blows were delivered from behind, and that the attack occurred from behind, and it was likely that a screwdriver was used to stab Ong. Out of the multiple wounds, one of them penetrated the ribs and another penetrated the pelvic bone, which also cut through the bladder and intestines. The second injury put forward by Singh was sufficient in the ordinary cause of nature to result in death if left unattended. Singh concluded that the cause of Ong's death was due to haemorrhage and shock due to multiple wounds.

Richard Lai, who was still serving his four-year sentence, came to court as the prosecution's key witness. Lai, who acted as the driver, testified that he only took part in the plan due to his need for money to discharge the huge financial debts incurred from his electrical firm business. Lai recounted that on the night of the murder, while he was driving the car along a secluded spot in Clementi, with Ong sitting next to him and the three murder accused sitting in the back, the trio suddenly took out a screwdriver, hammer and other tools to assault Ong from behind before they brutally murdered him. Lai, who was unaware of the presence of weapons, stated he was shocked at the violence and thought that their only plan was to kidnap rather than killing Ong. He stated that he was told to drive to a manhole in Jurong, where the trio abandoned the body. Richard was identified to be the one who negotiated the ransom with the Ong family through phone calls.

To the shock of Lee, his mother Goh Sui Hong and youngest brother Lee Chor Hock appeared as prosecution witnesses. Goh, who took the stand first, stated that she was asked to keep a large amount of money, which Lee passed to his brother Chor Hock for safekeeping. Goh also told the court that Lee, her eldest out of three sons, went to visit her in her house at Kulai and confessed that the money was a ransom obtained from the killing of his colleague, and he stated that he was forced to keep the money. Chor Hock also told the court that on that night, he saw his brother, Lim, Ho and Richard Lai cleaning the rented car (in which Ong was killed earlier) and Lai telling him to wash a bloodstained floormat from the car. Chor Hock also testified he saw the five conspirators of Ong's kidnapping carrying a bag of money (which was the ransom paid by Ong's father), which they divide between themselves.

=== Defences of the trio ===
Lee Chor Pet first took the stand. He denied that he killed Ong, and stated that the plan was only to kidnap Ong, knock him unconscious inside the car and confine him for a few days. However, inside the car, according to Lee's account, things went terribly wrong as Ho brandished the weapons and violently attacked Ong, stabbing him despite Lee's efforts to restrain Ho, who even slashed Lee's leg in retaliation, before he and the others chased after Ong, who escaped the car, and assaulted the youth to death. By Lee's insistence, the murder of Ong itself was not part of their pre-arranged plan to kidnap Ong. Under the questioning of the judge, Lee agreed that they indeed extorted the ransom of S$20,000 and later divided it into shares of less than S$4,000 for each of the five kidnappers.

Lim Kim Kwee was the next to give his defence. He claimed that his statements to the police were fabricated by the investigating officer Ong Hean Teik, and therefore put up an alibi defence, stating that he was working overtime at his workplace, an engineering firm. Although Lim's foreman and colleague were called to support his defence, they were however, unable to confirm Rajah's questions if they indeed saw Lim working overtime on the same night that fateful day when Ong was murdered.

Ho Kee Fatt, who took the stand last, put the blame entirely on Lee, claiming that Lee was the one who prepared all the weapons and brought them into the car, and claimed that on the night itself, Lee was the only person who used the weapons to viciously attack Ong while he himself did not lay a hand on Ong, and the murder itself was out of the scope of their kidnap plot.

=== Murder trial verdict ===
On 12 June 1970, Justice A V Winslow and Justice D C D'Cotta delivered their verdict. Justice Winslow, who pronounced the verdict in court, stated that they accepted the testimony of Richard Lai, considering him as a truthful witness despite their caution to accept his sole word against the three accused and the "despicable" conduct of Lai for having abetted the kidnapping and ransom negotiation. On the totality of evidence, the judges rejected Lee's "untruthful" account, Lim's alibi defence and Ho's claims of Lee being the sole person responsible for the killing, and they further determined that the trio were responsible for the ruthless and premeditated murder of Ong, who was unfortunate to be a target for kidnapping due to his family's affluent background.

Therefore, the three murderers - Lee Chor Pet, Lim Kim Kwee and Ho Kee Fatt - were found guilty of murder and sentenced to death by hanging. The trial itself was the first case where two judges presided the trial hearing of a capital case and sent three men to the gallows for murder, after the Singapore government abolished jury trials for capital crimes in January 1970, five months before the verdict of death was given.

== Appeal processes ==
On 3 March 1972, the Court of Appeal dismissed the appeals of the three men against their sentences.

After the rejection of his appeal, one of the three men, Lee Chor Pet, then applied for special leave to appeal to the Privy Council in London, with British lawyer Donald Farquharson, the Queen's Counsel, being assigned to him for free to represent him in the upcoming appeal. However, on 17 October 1972, the Privy Council dismissed Lee's appeal. Therefore, in a final bid to escape the gallows, Lee submitted a petition to the President of Singapore Benjamin Sheares for clemency. Lim and Ho, who both did not appeal to the Privy Council, also submitted their appeals for clemency, which would allow their sentences be commuted to life imprisonment if successful. However, President Sheares rejected the trio's pleas for clemency, thereby finalizing their sentences.

== Executions of convicts ==
On the morning of 27 January 1973, the three Ong Beang Leck murderers - 29-year-old Lee Chor Pet, 37-year-old Lim Kim Kwee and 28-year-old Ho Kee Fatt - were hanged at Changi Prison. Their families from Malaysia were informed of the men's death warrants and travelled to Singapore to retrieve the trio's remains. Their executions took place two months after their death row pleas for clemency were rejected by the President of Singapore. After the trio's executions, eight convicted killers, including bar hostess Mimi Wong and her sweeper husband Sim Woh Kum, remained on death row awaiting execution. At the time when the three men were hanged, the two minor accomplices Richard Lai and Chow Sien Cheong were already released from prison.

== Aftermath ==
17 years after his son's murder, Ong Yew Kee died at the age of 66 on 9 April 1985.

More than 30 years after the murder, the kidnapping of Ong was re-enacted by Singaporean crime show True Files, and the episode aired as the eighth episode of the show's third season on 13 December 2004. To protect his identity and privacy, the victim Ong Beang Leck's name was partially changed to Benny Ong.

K. S. Rajah, the former trial prosecutor of the murder trial, was interviewed in the episode, and while he spoke about the case, Rajah recounted that despite being the prosecutor, he felt sorry for the mastermind Lee Chor Pet's mother and third brother, who both came to court to testify against Lee, due to the distress they faced over the crime Lee was accused of. Among the cast, Lawrence Wong, a Malaysian actor based in Singapore and later in China, would portray one of the murderers Lee Chor Pet, which was one of his early roles of his career. Wong would eventually gain fame 14 years later for his role as palace guard Hai Lan Cha in 2018 Chinese historical drama Story of Yanxi Palace.

== See also ==
- Capital punishment in Singapore
- List of kidnappings (1960–1969)
