= A Million Dollar Dream =

- 给我一百万
- Genre: Drama; Family; Fantasy
- Written by: Lau Ching Poon 刘清盆
- Directed by: Martin Chan 陈金祥; Chen Yi You 陈忆幼
- Starring: Chen Hanwei; Zoe Tay; Edwin Goh; He Ying Ying
- Opening theme: 幸福感 by Chen Hanwei
- Ending theme: 终于失恋 by Ng Ling Kai
- Country of origin: Singapore
- Original language: Chinese
- No. of episodes: 20

Production
- Executive producer: Winnie Wong 王尤红
- Running time: approx. 45 minutes (excluding advertisements)

Original release
- Network: Mediacorp Channel 8
- Release: 9 April – 4 May 2018

A Million Dollar Dream (Chinese: 给我一百万) is a Chinese television drama that aired on the Singaporean television channel Mediacorp Channel 8. It stars Chen Hanwei, Zoe Tay, Edwin Goh and He Ying Ying.

== Cast ==
=== Luo (Yu'ai)'s family ===
- Liu Lingling as Luo Yu'ai 罗玉爱, a restaurant staff
- Chen Hanwei as Zhang Zicheng 张自成, a restaurant manager
- Zoe Tay as Hu Jiaofen 胡娇芬, a restaurant manager and wife of Zhang
- Edwin Goh as Zhang Yizheng 张一正, a restaurant staff
  - Brient Ong as a younger Zhang
- He Yingying as Zhang Yijing 张一静, a restaurant staff
  - Candice Tan as a younger Zhang

=== Hu (Tianhao)'s family ===
Cast	Character	Description
Chen Shucheng 陈澍城	Hu Tianhao 胡添豪	Old Crazy Git / Old Gila (老疯子): Ex-secondary school Chinese teacher; Hu Haishan, Hu Jiaofen and Hu Manfen's father; Zhang Zicheng's father-in-law; Zhang Yizheng and Zhang Yijing's grandfather; Suffered from dementia; Suffered from terminal lucidity (in Zhang Zicheng's dream); Suicided in Episode 18 after having been chased out of the house by Zhang Zicheng and Luo Yu'ai (in Zhang Zicheng's dream)
Allan Moo 巫奇	Hu Haishan 胡海山	Odd-job worker; Hu Tianhao's son; Hu Jiaofen and Hu Manfen's older brother; Zhang Zicheng's brother-in-law; Zhang Yizheng and Zhang Yijing's uncle
Bukoh Mary 巫许玛丽	Hu Manfen 胡曼芬	Nail Salon's manager; Hu Tianhao's younger daughter; Hu Haishan and Hu Jiaofen's youngest sister; Zhang Zicheng's sister-in-law; Zhang Yizheng and Zhang Yijing's aunt; Committed suicide in Episode 11 due to suffering from depression (in Zhang Zicheng's dream)

=== Other cast members ===
Cast	Character	Description	Episodes appeared
Zhu Houren 朱厚仁	Elder Ba 八哥	Younger Ba's older brother; Died after being accidentally knocked down by a car by Zhang Zicheng while picking up a 10-cent coin.; (Deceased-Episode 8)	1-3, 7-8
Zhu Houren 朱厚仁	Younger Ba 八弟	Elder Ba's younger brother; Suffered from Dementia	8-10, 12-14, 19-20
Joel Choo 朱哲伟	Max	Restaurant's employee; Zhang Yijing's boyfriend	1, 4-6, 10, 16, 18, 20
Michelle Wong 黄怡灵	Huang Qiqi 黄琪琪	Gigi, Babe (宝贝): Zhang Yizheng's ex-girlfriend; rich man's daughter; Suffered from leukaemia	1, 3-5, 13-14, 16-17, 18
Yao Wenlong 姚彣隆	Ma Tongren 马同仁	Toilet Man (马桶人): Ex-convict; Restaurant's chef head; Zhang Zicheng's best friend; Cheated $300K to start up a business with a loan from Zhang Zicheng and fleeing with Gao Juanjuan to Bali, betraying Zhang Zicheng (in Zhang Zicheng's dream)	3-17,19-20
Rayson Tan 陈泰铭	Zhou Yuzhe 周与浙	Mr Zhou (周先生): Zhang Zicheng's rival in love (in Zhang Zicheng's dream); In love with Hu Jiaofen (in Zhang Zicheng's dream); Donates $1 million to provide free breakfast for the restaurant	8-9, 12-15, 19-20
Wang Yuqing 王昱清	Wang Qiansui 王千岁	Villain but repented 9174, Mr Wang (王先生): Zhang Zicheng and Hu Jiaofen's neighbour; Humiliated Zhang Zicheng while washing his car and parked in between his car, was punched by Zhang Yizheng; Demanded $10 thousand for his injuries from Zhang Zicheng and Zhang Yizheng; Demanded another $10 thousand after being harassed by Ma Tongren not to harass Zhang Zicheng, demanding Zhang Zicheng a total of $20 thousand; Fought with an old man over an elevator	1, 3-4, 7, 10, 12, 18-20
Adele Wong 王筱惠	Fang Ziling 方姿灵	Villain Evon Fang: Zhang Zicheng's ex-superior; Picking hard times and keeping on humiliating Zhang Zicheng with Chen Jiande causing Zhang Zicheng to get highest votes to leave the company	1-5
Kathy Fung 冯秀華	Gao Juanjuan 高娟娟	Main Villain Insurance Office (保险公司) (Does Not Exist in Zicheng's Reality): indirectly caused Hu Jiaofen to think that Zhang Zicheng had an affair with her, breaking apart the family (in Zhang Zicheng's dream); In love with Zhang Zicheng; Hu Jiaofen's rival in love; Demanded $50 thousand from Zhang Zicheng and humiliated Hu Jiaofen and flew away with Ma Tongren to Bali (in Zhang Zicheng's dream)	13-16, 18-19
Haden Hee 许立楷	Hong Mingyang 洪名杨	Supporting Villain Mr Hong (洪老板): Modelling Agency's client; Zhang Yijing's ex-boyfriend; Toyed with Zhang Yijing's feelings and lied in stating that he had legally divorced his ex-wife. Broke up with Zhang Yijing after seeing scars on her face (in Zhang Zicheng's dream); Was shown that he had toyed with Zhang Yijing's feelings after Zhang Zicheng helped Zhang Yijing in looking disfigured	4-6, 8, 10, 12-13, 16-17, 20

=== Cameo appearances ===
Cast	Character	Description	Episodes Appeared
Marcus Mok 莫健发	You Zhi 佑治	Zhang Zicheng's ex-overall supervisor	1-2
Kenneth Chung	Jeft	Zhang Zicheng's ex-colleague	1-2
Terence Tay 郑仲伟	Chen Jiande 陈建德	Villain: Zhang Zicheng's ex-colleague	1-2
Cansen Goh 吴开深	Peter 皮特	Main Villain: Modelling Agency's ex-manager; Zhang Yijing's model instructor; Arrested after harassing Zhang Zicheng for $200 thousand and slashed Zhang Yijing, causing her to be disfigured (in Zhang Zicheng's dream)	1, 3-8, 16
Chase Tan	Shawn	Came from London; Huang Qiqi's friend	3-4
Sherraine Law 罗翊琦	Shirley 雪莉	Modelling Agency's model; Zhang Yijing's friend	4-5, 17
Nico Chua 蔡伟彬	Fion Zhou	Hired Hu Jiaofen as a part-time maid to help her tidy the house; Zhou Yuzhe's younger sister	7-8, 11, 15
Teo Serli 张思丽	Sun	Zhang Zicheng's communter	7-8
Benjamin Josiah Tan 陈俊铭	Xavier	Zhang Yijing's customer	10
Tan Tiow Im 陈天祥	Uncle Shui 水伯	An old man who stays at the nursing home	1-2, 7

== Original Sound Track (OST) ==
No.	Song title	Singer(s)
1)	幸福感 (Main Song for the series)	Chen Hanwei 陈汉玮
2)	终于失恋	Ling Kai 铃凯

== Accolades ==
Organisation	Year	Category	Nominees	Result	Ref.
Star Awards	2019	Best Newcomer	Joel Choo	Nominated	
Star Awards	2019	Best Supporting Actress	He Yingying	Nominated	
Star Awards	2019	Best Supporting Actor	Chen Shucheng	Won	
Star Awards	2019	Best Actress	Zoe Tay	Won	
Star Awards	2019	Best Actor	Chen Hanwei	Won	
Star Awards	2019	Best Drama Serial	—N/a	Nominated	

== See also ==
- List of programmes broadcast by Mediacorp Channel 8
