= He Ying Ying =

Singaporean actress (born 1995)

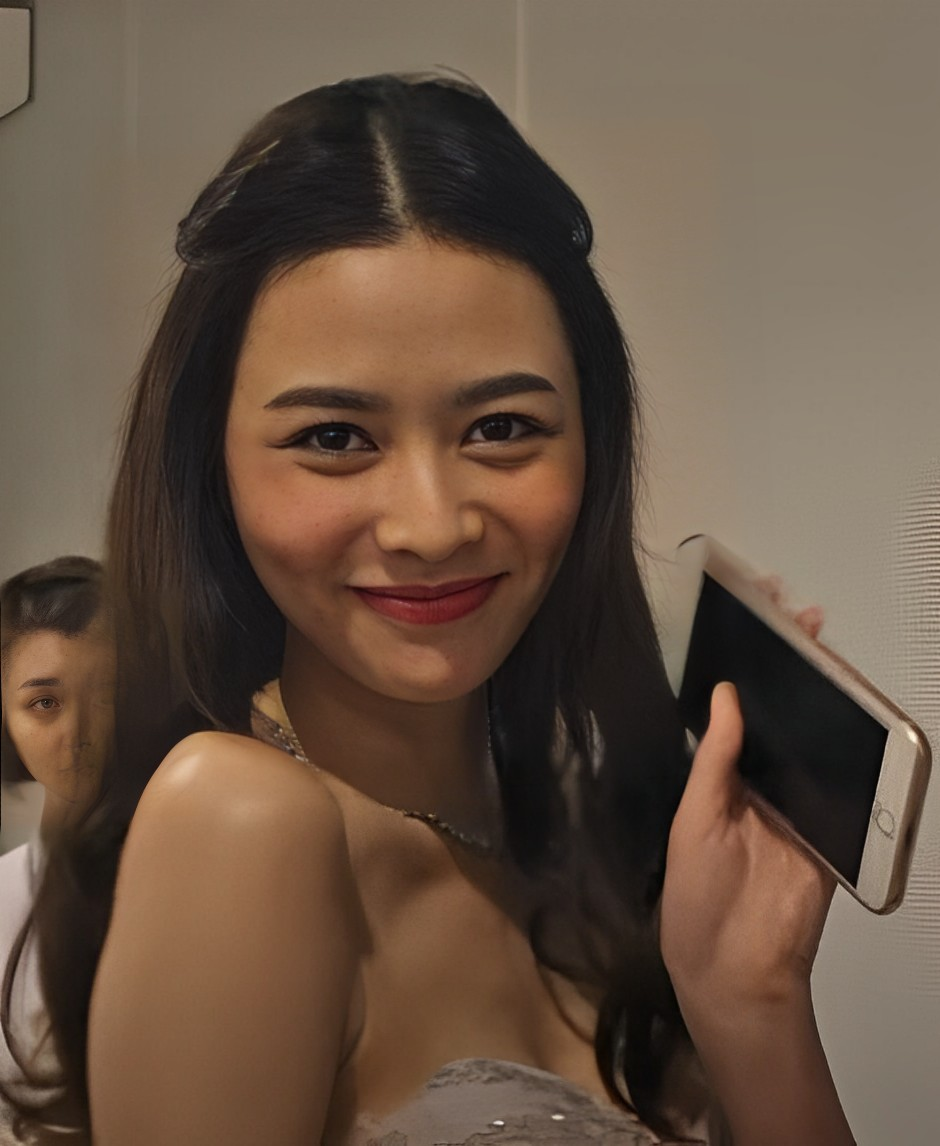
- He at the Star Awards 2017
- Born: Hor Ying Ying; 28 January 1995 (age 31); Singapore
- Education: National University of Singapore
- Occupation: Actress
- Years active: 2015−present

Chinese name
- Traditional Chinese: 何盈瑩
- Simplified Chinese: 何盈莹
- Hanyu Pinyin: Hé Yíngyíng

He Ying Ying (born Hor Ying Ying on 28 January 1995) is a Singaporean actress.

== Early life and education ==
He Ying Ying was born into a family made up of her father, businessman, her mother, a preschool educator, and a brother. She was educated at Anderson Junior College before she finished her studies at the National University of Singapore with a Bachelor of Arts (Communications and New Media) in July 2017.

== Career ==
In 2015, while still studying in NUS, He Ying Ying was scouted by Ben Yeo and Kate Pang on campus to join the talent scouting competition, Hey Gorgeous, which was aired on Mediacorp Channel 8. She was eventually placed as one of the two runner-ups in the competition. Through the competition, she started considering joining the showbiz industry.

By December 2016, He Ying Ying had signed with Mediacorp's talent management agency, The Celebrity Agency. She appeared in various dramas mostly with cameo appearances and supporting roles in television dramas, before taking on the lead role in Run Rachael Run, in which she was nominated for the Best Leading Actress award in the 2016 Bilbao Web Fest. For her work in Hero, she also gained a nomination for Top 10 Most Popular Female Artistes in Star Awards 2017.

After having graduated in July 2017, Ying Ying then turned to full-time acting as a career. She took up supporting roles in 118 II, a 218-episode long-running drama for which, she was nominated for the Best Newcomer award in Star Awards 2018. In 2018, Ying Ying reprised her role for the 2018 sequel to 118 II, 118 Reunion. She also took on two roles in Reach for the Skies, another Long-running drama, playing twins who are in love with the same male character.

In 2019, among the various dramas she had acted in 2018, she was nominated for the Best Supporting Actress award in Star Awards 2019 for her role in A Million Dollar Dream. She filmed Walk With Me, Voyage Of Love, Dear Neighbours, C.L.I.F. 5 and After The Stars.

== Filmography ==
=== Television series ===
Year	Title	Role	Notes	Ref.
2016	Project W (W 计划)	Lin Lingling	Cameo	
2016	Eat Already?	Mei Mei		
2016	Hero	Guan Meiyu		
2016	Run Rachael Run	Rachael Chow Ying Jie		
2017	118 II	Xiao Dingdong		
2017	The Lead	Jing Jing		
2018	118 Reunion (118 大团圆)	Xiao Dingdong		
2018	Eat Already? 4	Mei Mei		
2018	A Lonely Fish (寂寞鱼·听见)	Lan Jingxuan		
2018	Reach for the Skies	Xu Jingxin		
2018	Reach for the Skies	Xu Jingchu		
2018	A Million Dollar Dream	Zhang Yijing		
2018	Dream Walkers (梦行者)	Lin Xiaoqing		
2018	Gangster Mom	Yang Yang	Cameo	
2018	Ghost AR	Rei		
2019	Walk With Me (谢谢你出现在我的行程里)	Xie Jiaqi		
2019	Voyage Of Love (爱。起航)	Ye Jingyi		
2019	Dear Neighbours (我的左邻右里)	Yu Jiaying		
2019	C.L.I.F. 5	Lek Simin		
2019	After The Stars (攻星计)	Jiang Xiaomin		
2020	Best Friends Forever (致2020的我们)	Wu Siya		
2020	A Jungle Survivor (森林生存记)	Jess Lin Jiexi		
2021	Soul Old Yet So Young (心里住着老灵魂)	Bai Xiangguo		
2021	The Heartland Hero (邻里帮)	Zhou Liqi		
2022	Dark Angel (黑天使)	Gu Wangqing		
2023	Strike Gold (黄金巨塔)	Mei Xiaoxi		
2023	Cash on Delivery (送餐英雄)	Qiu Siting		
2023	All That Glitters (金色大道)	Lin Jiahui		
2024	Once Upon A New Year's Eve (那一年的除夕夜)	Cai Yiwen		
2024	Never Too Late (最佳遗产)	Luo Enqi		

== Discography ==
=== Compilation albums ===
Year	Title	Ref.
2018	MediaCorp Music Lunar New Year Album 18 (阿狗狗旺旺過好年)	
2019	MediaCorp Music Lunar New Year Album 19 (新传媒群星猪饱饱欢乐迎肥年)	
2020	MediaCorp Music Lunar New Year Album 20 (裕鼠鼠纳福迎春乐)	
2023	MediaCorp Music Lunar New Year Album 23 (新传媒2023贺岁传辑哈皮兔宝福星照)	

== Awards and nominations ==
Year	Award Ceremony	Category	Nominated Work	Result	Ref.
2016	Bilbao Web Fest	Best Leading Actress	Run Rachael Run (as Rachael Chow)	Nominated	
2017	Star Awards	Top 10 Most Popular Female Artistes	Hero (as Guan Meiyu)	Nominated	
2018	Star Awards	Best Newcomer	118 II (as Xiao Dingdong)	Nominated	
2019	Star Awards	Best Supporting Actress	A Million Dollar Dream (as Zhang Yijing)	Nominated	
2021	Star Awards	Top 10 Most Popular Female Artistes	—N/a	Nominated	
2022	Star Awards	Bioskin Most Charismatic Artiste Award	—N/a	Nominated	
2024	Star Awards	Favourite CP	Cash On Delivery (as Qiu Si Ting with Lin Juncong)	Nominated	
2024	Star Awards	Top 10 Most Popular Female Artistes	—N/a	Won	
2024	Star Awards	Bioskin Most Charismatic Artiste Award	—N/a	Nominated	
2025	Star Awards	Top 10 Most Popular Female Artistes	—N/a	Nominated	
