= Das DD =

Singaporean host and actor (born 1990)

- Born: 1 March 1990 (age 36); Singapore
- Other names: Das; Dasa Dharamahsena
- Education: Nanyang Polytechnic
- Occupations: Host; actor; comedian
- Years active: 2015−present

Dharmadasa D. Dharamahsena (born 1 March 1990), known professionally as Das DD, is a Singaporean television host, actor and comedian who speaks fluently in Tamil, English, Mandarin and Malay. In 2023, he became the first person of Indian descent to be nominated for and win in a performance-based category at Mediacorp's Star Awards.

== Early life and career ==
An only child, Das DD's father is a Malaysian and his mother is a Singaporean who grew up in a Malay kampong. The first language Das DD spoke was Tamil, at his mother's request, when he was in nursery school. He subsequently learned English and Mandarin, the latter which is due to the reason that Tamil was not offered as a second language by his preschool and kindergarten. Both his parents used to speak Malay to each other, and Das DD had also used the language to communicate with an Indonesian domestic helper and his grasp on the language became better as he had a close group of Malay-speaking friends when serving military service.

Das DD got his start in the entertainment industry through appearing as a guest host on radio station Kiss 92FM with Joshua Simon on his show Joshua’s Goodnight Kiss. At Kiss 92FM, he became acquainted with John Klass and his wife, who both enlisted him as a production manager for a music video. Through the job, he was roped in by Loretta Lopez for a project where she banded budding stand-up comedians for a show. Some time later, he was invited by Ryan Tan from Night Owl Cinematics (NOC) to join his company. Das DD left the YouTube outfit in 2021.

In 2022, Das DD made his film debut in the Chinese New Year comedy-drama Reunion Dinner. While promoting the film on the online series, #JustSwipeLah, Das DD attracted the attention of the producers, who later reached out with an offer for him to host the show.

The following year, he was named Best Rising Star at the Star Awards 2023.

In early April 2023, he signed an exclusive talent contract with digital content site SGAG.

He has also appeared in several Vasantham series and Suria shows.

== Filmography ==
He has appeared in the following programmes and films:

=== Television series ===
- Intercept (2017)
- Senior Management (2018)
- Crimewatch 2020 (2020; episode 1)
- Couple Cosmo (2020)
- Future Proof (2021)
- Crimewatch 2021 (2021; episode 6)
- Soul Detective (2022)
- Home Is Where The Heart Is (2022)
- Crimewatch 2022 (2022; episode 5)
- Cash on Delivery (2023)
- All That Glitters (2023)

=== Variety show ===
- #JustSwipeLah (2022-present)
- Mr Zhou's Ghost Stories @ Singapore Sightings (2022)
- Streamers Go Live (2022)

=== Film ===
- Reunion Dinner (2022)
- King of Hawkers (2024)

== Awards and nominations ==
Year	Award	Category	Nominated work	Result	Ref.
2023	Star Awards	Top 3 Most Popular Rising Stars	—N/a	Nominated	
2023	Star Awards	Best Rising Star	#JustSwipeLah	Won	
2024	Star Awards	Top 3 Most Popular Rising Stars	—N/a	Nominated	
2025	Star Awards	Top 10 Most Popular Male Artistes	—N/a	Nominated	
