= Reunion Dinner (film) =

2022 Singaporean Mandarin-language comedy film

- Directed by: Ong Kuo Sin
- Produced by: Fran Borgia; Melvin Mak; Simon Leong
- Starring: Lawrence Wong; Cya Liu; Mark Lee; Xiang Yun; Guo Liang; Zhu Houren; Mimi Choo
- Edited by: Erin Er
- Music by: Gary Leo
- Production companies: Clover Films iQIYI; King Kong Media Production; Mediacorp; Byleft Productions; Akanga Film Asia
- Distributed by: Golden Village Pictures
- Release date: 20 January 2022
- Running time: 91 minutes
- Country: Singapore
- Language: Mandarin

Reunion Dinner (Chinese: 团圆饭) is a 2022 Singaporean Chinese New Year comedy film. It tells the story of a soon-to-be-married couple who arrange for their parents to meet for the first time over Chinese New Year reunion dinner. But as the boyfriend is estranged from his mother, he fakes a family to impress them instead.

The film was released on 20 January 2022 in Singapore and 31 January 2022 in Malaysia during the Chinese New Year period. The film stars Lawrence Wong, Cya Liu, Mark Lee, Xiang Yun, Guo Liang, Zhu Houren, Mimi Choo and Das DD.

It was one of the five 2022 Malaysian and Singaporean Chinese New Year films, including Ah Girls Go Army (Singapore), Nasi Lemak 1.0, Kongsi Raya and Small Town Heroes (Malaysia).

It is also not related to the 2009 Chinese New Year drama Reunion Dinner in any way despite sharing the exact same title and both starring Zhu, and another difference is that he was playing one of the main protagonists in the drama and the main antagonist in this film.

== Plot ==
A couple who works in an advertising agency, Chaoyang (Lawrence Wong) and Zihong (Cya Liu) have a marriage on the cards, but both have not met each other's parents. At a client's request, they have to do a livestream of their own reunion dinner to promote the company's food products, and their parents will officially meet for the first time.

Estranged with his mother Yanling (Xiang Yun) and embarrassed by her occupation as a mama-san, Chaoyang decides to fake a family with the help of his mother's boyfriend Wei (Mark Lee) and two freelance actors, who pretend to be his mother and "fake relatives", resulting in a series of mishaps and hilarity. With Zihong's father flying in from China, and a fake family assembled, can the reunion dinner go smoothly? Can Chaoyang fix the broken relationship with his mother, and would they celebrate Chinese New Year's Eve and Chinese New Year smoothly?

== Cast ==
- Lawrence Wong as Li Chaoyang
- Cya Liu as Liu Zi Hong
- Mark Lee as Wei, Yan Ling's boyfriend and part-time actor
- Xiang Yun as Li Yanling, Chaoyang's estranged mother
  - Ferlyn G as young Yanling
- Guo Liang as Liu Lanting, a Chinese war veteran and Zi Hong's father
- Zhu Houren as Huang Hailong, Yanling's ex-boyfriend
  - Joel Choo as young Hailong
- Mimi Choo as Zhang Ai Jia, a part-time actress hired to play Chaoyang's mother
- Das DD as AK, a part-time actor hired to play Chaoyang's cousin
- Henry Thia as a police officer

== Release ==
The film was directed by Singaporean director Ong Kuo Sin; his previous film was Number 1 (2020), which also starred Mark Lee and Henry Thia. Filming was completed in July 2021 in Singapore.

It starred Malaysian-born Singaporean actor Lawrence Wong and Chinese actress Cya Liu, and its cast includes well-known Singaporean actors and actress Mark Lee, Xiang Yun, Guo Liang, Zhu Houren, Hong Kong-based Malaysian veteran actress Mimi Choo and multilingual comedian Dasa DD, as well as special appearances by Ferlyn G, Joel Choo.

The film was released on 20 January 2022 in Singapore and 31 January 2022 in Malaysia during the Chinese New Year period. It was also released on iQIYI for the China market on 27 January 2022.

== See also ==
- Reunion Dinner (2009)
- Happy Family (2010)
- Prosperity (2011)
