= Mars Vs. Venus =

- Also known as: 金星火星大不同
- Genre: Talk show
- Presented by: Season 1: Cruz Teng & Siau Jiahui; Season 2: Andie Chen & Kate Pang (Ep. 27-39), Bryan Wong & Quan Yi Fong (Ep. 40-52)
- Country of origin: Singapore
- Original language: Mandarin
- No. of seasons: 2

Production
- Camera setup: Multiple
- Running time: 60 minutes (with commercials)

Original release
- Release: April 13, 2015 – present

Mars Vs. Venus (金星火星大不同) is a Singaporean Mandarin talkshow previously hosted by YES 933 DJs Cruz Teng and Siau Jiahui, but currently hosted by Bryan Wong and Quan Yi Fong. Debuting on 13 Apr 2015, it is aired on MediaCorp Channel U as part of its revamp. It is premiered at 9pm on Mondays, with an encore telecast at 11.30pm on the same night. It aims to be a talk show that is rich in content, thought-provoking and critical in reflecting the personal values of the different sexes. Through various interaction and debates, the show will be witnessing the real characteristics of men and women in the show.

== Hosts ==
- Cruz Teng - currently Head of Singapore's top radio station YES 933 and host of its morning show.
- Siau Jiahui - Host of YES 933's morning show

== Concept ==
Mars Vs. Venus discusses gender based topics with a panel of local celebrities.

== Lineup ==
Ep	Date	Topic	Guests
01	13.04.2015	Women cheat too!	Tay Ping Hui, Marcus Chin, Kenneth Chung, Kate Pang, Chris Tong
02	20.04.2015	Women, why can't you just say what you mean?	Tay Ping Hui, Guo Liang, Lee Teng, Kate Pang, Priscelia Chan
03	27.04.2015	JUST friends? Come on, that's JUST an excuse!	Tay Ping Hui, Lee Teng, Elvin Ng, Lina Ng, Tracy Lee, Silver Ang
04	04.05.2015	So are we still getting married?	Ben Yeo, Wang Weiliang, Alfred Sim, Tay Kewei, Kate Pang, Silver Ang
05	11.05.2015	I must have been blind when I fell for you!	Lee Teng, Marcus Chin, Jeffrey Xu, Lina Ng, Chris Tong, Seraph Sun
06	18.05.2015	Men, step aside! It's time for Girl Power!	Dasmond Koh, Guo Liang, Rayson Tan, Kenneth Chung, Lin Cuifang, Patricia Mok
07	25.05.2015	Older ladies just love young fresh meat!	Marcus Chin, Desmond Tan, Charles Lee, Ann Kok, Patricia Mok, Rosalyn Lee
08	01.06.2015	First Dates	Shane Pow, Sugie, Nick Teo, Jin Yinji, Sora Ma, Jayley Woo
09	22.06.2015	Let's Break Up	Marcus Chin, Shane Pow, Ian Fang, Lina Ng, Sheila Sim
10	29.06.2015	I want to be more beautiful!	Marcus Chin, Romeo Tan, Keith Png; Lina Ng, Sora Ma, Qiu Qiu
11	06.07.2015	Long-distance relationship will never work?!	Jeremy Chan, Yusuke Fukuchi, Hong Junyang (via real-time broadcast); Kym Ng, Vivian Lai, Tracy Lee
12	13.07.2015	Why am I still single?	Jeffrey Xu, Daren Tan; Kym Ng, Lina Ng, Paige Chua
13	20.07.2015	What a big difference before and after marriage!	Zheng Geping, Brandon Wong, Benjamin Heng; Hong Huifang, Lina Ng, Kate Pang
14	27.07.2015	What a big difference before and after marriage!	Zheng Geping, Brandon Wong, Benjamin Heng; Hong Huifang, Lina Ng, Kate Pang
15	03.08.2015		
16	10.08.2015		
17	17.08.2015		
18	24.08.2015		
19	31.08.2015		
20	07.09.2015		
21	14.09.2015		
22	21.09.2015		
23	28.09.2015		
24	05.10.2015		
25	12.10.2015		
26	19.10.2015		
27	11.04.2016		
28	18.04.2016		
29	25.04.2016		
30	02.05.2016		
31	09.05.2016		
32	16.05.2016		
33	23.05.2016		
34	30.05.2016		
