= Prosperity (Singaporean TV series) =

- 喜事年年
- Genre: Chinese New Year; Family
- Starring: Hong Huifang; Aileen Tan; Priscelia Chan; Terence Cao; Tiffany Leong; Tracy Lee; Andie Chen
- Opening theme: 转不过的弯 (No boundaries) by Le Sheng
- Ending theme: 只能是朋友 (Just friends) by Le Sheng
- Country of origin: Singapore
- Original language: Mandarin
- No. of episodes: 22

Production
- Producer: Lin Mingzhe
- Production location: Singapore
- Running time: approx. 45 minutes

Original release
- Network: MediaCorp Channel 8
- Release: 10 January – 11 February 2011

Related
- Reunion Dinner (2009 Chinese New Year Drama Series); Happy Family (2010); Reunion Dinner (2022 Chinese New Year Movie)

Prosperity (simplified Chinese: 喜事年年) is a Singaporean Chinese family drama produced by MatrixVision, revolving around the lives of three sisters having their own families. It stars Hong Huifang, Aileen Tan, Priscelia Chan, Terence Cao, Tiffany Leong, Tracy Lee and Andie Chen as the cast of the series. It made its debut on Singapore's free-to-air channel, MediaCorp Channel 8 on 10 January 2011 and ended on 11 February 2011. This drama serial consists of 22 episodes, and was screened on every weekday night at 9.00 pm.

This drama had made its rerun from 29 December 2011 and ended on 31 January 2012, at 5.30p.m.

== Cast ==
- Hong Huifang as Tang Aixin 唐爱心
- Aileen Tan as Tang Aili 唐爱丽
- Priscelia Chan as Tang Aiming 唐爱瞑
- Ye Shipin as Lin Shunping 林顺平, Aixin's husband
- Zhu Houren as Tian Hongming 沺宏铭, Aili's husband
- Terence Cao as Tao Jinhan 陶金翰, Aiming's husband
- Tiffany Leong as Natalie, one of Aixin's foster children
- Rebecca Lim as Janice Tian, Hongming and Aili's daughter
- Tracy Lee Lin Si'en 林思恩, Shunping and Aixin's daughter
- Andie Chen as Ma Yongjie 马永捷, Aixin's son
- Yuan Shuai as Tim, one of Aixin's foster children
