= After School (2003 film) =

- The logo for After School
- Directed by: Zhu Houren
- Starring: Jacelyn Tay; Thomas Ong; Wang Ruixian; Liang Zhihui; Shun Ai Liu
- Distributed by: National Crime Prevention Council
- Release date: 22 November 2003
- Country: Singapore
- Language: Mandarin

After School is a 2003 Singaporean crime film directed by Zhu Houren. The film was commissioned by Singapore's National Crime Prevention Council. It is based on a true story.

== Plot ==
Siao Han is a 16-year-old secondary 4 student whose parents abandoned him when he was young. Siao Han is getting ready for the end of school with his best friend, his girlfriend, Lily, and his girlfriend's best friend. In a shopping centre, they shoplift from various shops. Siao Han is caught and reported to the police, whose leading officer is his older sister. His best friend came to his rescue, but Shao Han's sister brings Shao Han to further investigations. Lily sees this and walks away in disappointment.

At home, during dinner, Shao Han becomes angry with his sister for arresting him on her first day leading a team. He visits his aunt's place to smoke and visit Ah Xiong, an elder cousin and a bookie. After his sister comes and finds him, Shao Han runs off. Ah Xiong wants to woo Siao Han's sister.

At Siao Han's school, his best friend discusses Lily and their supposed breaking up. While talking, a bully hits Siao Han's best friend, and Siao Han gives him a hard glare which Lily sees, though the bully continues taunting him. Lily goes to a nightclub, telling her mother that she is going to do a project, and steals a phone. After gang members catch her, their gang leader, M, gives his number to Lily, and she starts hanging out with the gang.

Siao Han and his best friend ask Ah Xiong for advice. After getting none, he gets his gang and bashes the bully up, and Siao han's best friend fights one-on-one against the bully. The next day, he starts becoming a gangster and the leader of the gang. His gang confronts M's gang and Lily, and Lily gives a proposition: whoever steals the most expensive bag for her, she will be his at her 16th birthday. Siao Han and M go to the same shop and try to steal, but Siao Han is caught dumbfounded as he stands at the detector, resulting in his getting caught. He is later bailed out by his sister, which results in another argument between them.

Lily and M's gang celebrate her birthday at the nightclub when she meets them. She is drunk, and M starts caressing her body, afterwards dragging her to the male toilet, where she vomits. M washes her face and throws her in the toilet stall and rapes her, shown when she is left alone in the toilet in her pink panties after M and his gang have left the toilet. She commits suicide at her home afterwards, while Ah Xiong is beaten up by gang members for refusing to be a bookie anymore, resulting in both broken legs. This infuriates Siao Han, who thirsts for revenge. He contacts his best friend, who reveals that it was M's gang who raped Lily and caused her death, and also beat up Ah Xiong. He sends his gang to beat M's gang up. Siao Han and his sister visit Ah Xiong at the hospital but run off. His sister chases him, resulting in a dramatic chase. A conversation between the siblings reveals their parents favoured Siao Han more, leaving his sister to their grandmother, but in the end still leaving Siao Han to his aunt. During this, it is shown that M and his gang are in an argument because the newspaper has news of them raping Lily and causing her death, while Siao Han's best friend is intending to ambush them.

In the gangfight, M's gang members pushed all the blame to M, which makes him chased by the gang. He meets a dead end when he sees Siao han charging at him, while his best friend stabs him from the back.

== Cast ==
- Jacelyn Tay as Lin Yifang
- Thomas Ong as Ah Xiong
- Wang Ruixian as Shao Han
- Liang Zhihui as Chen Han Xiang
- Shun Ai Liu as Zhong Lili
- Hong Huifang
- Jin Yinji
- Zhu Houren

== Reception ==
Wendy Cheng of Today rated it 2/5 stars and criticized the acting, music, and product placement, which she called "blatant".

Royston Tan, director of 15, said that he heard After School was made in response to his film. This was denied by Singapore's National Crime Prevention Council, who sponsored After School.
