= Seraph Sun =

Singaporean actress

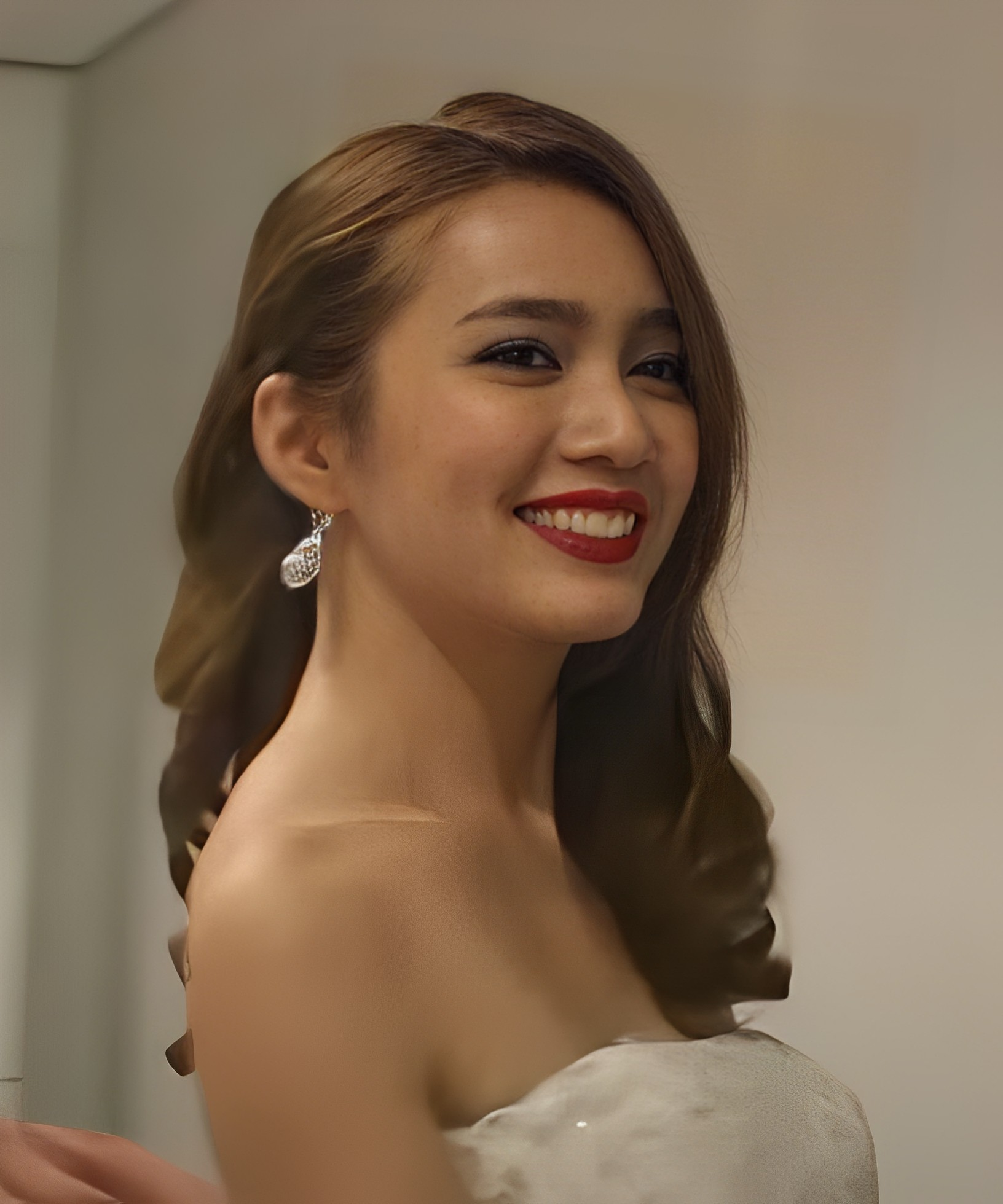
- Sun at the Star Awards 2017
- Born: Seraphine Sng Sin Pei; 30 December 1988 (age 37); Singapore
- Education: National University of Singapore
- Occupations: Actress; television host; model
- Years active: 2013−2017

Chinese name
- Traditional Chinese: 孫欣佩
- Simplified Chinese: 孙欣佩
- Hanyu Pinyin: Sūn Xīnpèi
- Website: www.seraph-sun.com

Seraphine Sng Sin Pei (born 30 December 1988), also known as Seraph Sun, is a Singaporean former actress. She was a full-time Mediacorp artiste from 2013 to 2017. She won the "Ms Popularity" title in S.N.A.P. in 2012, and starred in dramas such as Peace & Prosperity and films such as Miss J Contemplates Her Choice.

== Early life ==
Sun graduated with Honours in Sociology from National University of Singapore. She had been acting in numerous school plays, and started part-time modelling with Upfront Models during her university days. She is effectively trilingual and studied in Osaka, Japan.

== Career ==
Sun was talent-spotted in Marina Square during the filming of S.N.A.P. in 2012, and in 2013, was offered a MediaCorp contract. She made her acting debut in the web drama portion of 96°C Café with a small role, and became a guest host on Style: Check-in 3. With her Japanese language skills, she was soon given the opportunity to participate in the gameshow Find The Wasabi, a special collaboration with Japan TBS Station.

In 2014, Sun made her film debut in Miss J Contemplates Her Choice, starring as the younger version of Kit Chan's role. She also filmed 118 and made a cameo appearance in a toggle original series, Mystic Whisper that landed her nomination for Best Newcomer in Star Awards 2015.

In 2015, she filmed Life Is Beautiful and had a breakthrough where she scored a major role in Hand In Hand, along with other veteran actors like Bryan Wong and Jesseca Liu. She was one of the Sheng Siong hosts of outdoor cooking after actress Tracy Lee left the entertainment industry.

In 2016, she involved in a long running drama series, Peace & Prosperity where she lands her nomination for Top 10 Most Popular Female Artistes in Star Awards 2017. She has since relocated back to Singapore and is currently a digital content editor at a media startup.

== Filmography ==
=== Television series ===
Year	Title	Network	Role	Notes	Ref.
2017	Dream Coder 梦想程式	Mediacorp Channel 8	Feng Ruiqing 冯瑞晴		
2016	Fine Tune	Mediacorp Channel 5	Eunice		
2016	The Dream Job 绝世好工	Mediacorp Channel 8	Actress 女演员		
2016	Peace & Prosperity 富贵平安	Mediacorp Channel 8	Xu Cuihua 许翠华		
2015	Hand In Hand 手牵手	Mediacorp Channel 8	Hong Meiting 洪美婷		
2015	Life Is Beautiful 初一的心愿	Mediacorp Channel 8	Zhang Junxiu 张俊秀		
2015	Love On Air 音为爱		Sun Xinpei 孙欣佩	Cameo Testube Series	
2014	118	Mediacorp Channel 8	Ella Lee		
2014	Mystic Whispers 听		Melissa	Cameo	

=== Variety show appearances ===
Year	Title	Notes	Ref.
2013	Find The Wasabi		
2014	Property SOS 小房子,大投资		
2014	Body SOS 3 小毛病, 大问题3	Guest	
2014	Shoot It S2 哪里出问题？2 之食在有问题		
2014	ePuff S2 娱乐泡芙		
2015	Mars Vs. Venus 金星火星大不同		
2015	The Joy Truck 3 快乐速递		
2016	Mars Vs. Venus 2 金星火星大不同2	Ep. 23	
2016	Closet Secrets 衣橱密语		

=== TV hosting ===
Year	Title	Notes	Ref.
2013	Star Collectibles 戏剧信息	Host	
2013	Style Check-In 2 潮人攻略2	Guest host	
2014	Style Check-In 3 潮人攻略3	Guest host	
2015–2017	The Sheng Siong Show 缤纷万千在升菘	Segment host	
2016	Science Behind the Scream 游乐园里看科学	Host	

== Accolades ==
Year	Ceremony	Category	Nominated work	Result
2012	S.N.A.P.	Ms Popularity	—N/a	Won
2015	21st Star Awards Ceremony	Best Newcomer	—N/a	Nominated
2017	23rd Star Awards Ceremony	Top 10 Most Popular Female Artistes	Peace & Prosperity (as Xu Cuihua)	Nominated
