= Star Awards 2019 =

Singaporean television awards

Star Awards 25 红星大奖25
- Sponsored by: Bioskin (Presenter); Chan Brothers; Simmons; Mercedes-Benz (Official Car); Poh Heng Jewellery; KFC Singapore; Bee Cheng Hiang; Dream Cruises; A1 AK Koh Enterprise; Courts Singapore
- Date: Walk Of Fame & Awards Ceremony; 14 April 2019
- Location: MES Theatre @ Mediacorp (Awards Ceremony)
- Country: Singapore
- Hosted by: Creative Achievement Awards; Quan Yi Fong; Desmond Ng; Walk-of-fame: Lee Teng; Gao Meigui; Hazelle Teo; Awards Ceremony; Quan Yi Fong; Post-show Party; Henry Law; Kenneth Chung; Hazelle Teo

Highlights
- Most awards: A Million Dollar Dream; Blessings 2 (3 each)
- Most nominations: Blessings 2 (8); A Million Dollar Dream (6)
- Best Drama Serial: Blessings 2
- Best Variety Show: GeTai Challenge 2018
- Former Awards: All-time Favourite Artiste: Kym Ng; Special Achievement Award: Chew Chor Meng

Television/radio coverage
- Network: Mediacorp Channel 8 Mediacorp Channel U Toggle; YouTube
- Runtime: 180 mins (Awards Ceremony); 60 mins (Walk-of-fame/Post Party)

Star Awards 2019 (also SA25, Chinese: 红星大奖25) is a television award ceremony which is held in Singapore. Star Awards 2019 marks the 25th anniversary, or Silver Jubilee, of the Star Awards since it was first awarded in 1994, hence subtitled Star Awards 25. The theme for the ceremony is "The Moment", highlighting the best moments of the local television industries alongside Singapore's talents and audiences as well. This is also the first award ceremony to feature a vocalized version of the Awards' theme tune, titled 《星光》(lit. "Starlight").

Two dramas which received the top two highest nominations, Blessings 2 (eight) and A Million Dollar Dream (six), were tied with the most wins with three; Blessings 2 won the Best Drama Serial, Best Director and Young Talent Awards, while A Million Dollar Dream won three of four acting categories except Best Supporting Actress. No other drama or variety programs won multiple awards, as 12 programs won only one, five of which were from the drama category. This was also the first ceremony in Star Awards history both the Special Achievement and All-Time Favourite Artiste awards, an award replacing in-lieu of the former award, were presented on the same show. In the popularity awards, Chen Shucheng, Hong Huifang and Zhu Houren won their first Top 10 Most Popular Artiste award, while Dasmond Koh won his tenth award; Chen Xiuhuan won her second Top 10 Award, making her first win for this category since 1994, 25 years earlier.

A short series, 24 Milestones《回顾红星25》 (lit. Recap of Star Awards 25), was produced in commemoration to the celebration. A one-minute long highlight snippet was uploaded daily at midnight on Toggle, featuring the best moments of Star Awards starting from the debut year of 1994, from 20 March onwards, beginning a 24-day countdown towards the ceremony.

== Programme details ==
Date	Shows	Time	Network
14 April 2019	Star Awards 2019 - Artiste Preparation	3.00 pm to 5.30 pm	Toggle
14 April 2019	Star Awards 2019 - Walk of fame	5.30 pm to 6.30 pm	Mediacorp Channel 8 Mediacorp Channel U Toggle; YouTube
14 April 2019	Star Awards 2019 - Walk of fame	6.00 pm to 7.00 pm	Astro Xi Yue HD
14 April 2019	Star Awards 2019– Backstage Interviews	6.30 pm to 10.00 pm	Toggle
14 April 2019	Star Awards 2019– Awards Ceremony	7.00 pm to 10.00 pm	Mediacorp Channel 8 Mediacorp Channel U Astro Xi Yue HD; Toggle; YouTube
14 April 2019	Star Awards 2019– Post-show Party	10.00 pm to 11.00 pm	Toggle
21 April 2019 (Encore Telecast)	Star Awards 2019– Walk of fame	2.30 pm to 3.30 pm	Mediacorp Channel 8
21 April 2019 (Encore Telecast)	Star Awards 2019 - Awards Ceremony	3.30 pm to 6.30 pm	Mediacorp Channel 8
27 & 28 January 2020	Star Awards 2019 - Awards Ceremony	11.00am	8TV Malaysia

== Nominees and winners ==
=== Creative achievement awards ===
On 28 March 2019, the presentation of creative achievement awards was held at Level 9 of MediaCorp Campus to recognise the achievements of Mediacorp’s creative staff in the past year. The presentation were held outside the main Star Awards ceremony.

The awards were hosted by Desmond Ng and Quan Yi Fong and was presented on Channel 8's Facebook page live. Tham Loke Kheng, CEO of MediaCorp, gave out the Awards to the recipients.

Winners are listed first, highlighted in boldface.

**Best Screenplay**: **Lau Ching Poon – 29th February**; Rebecca Leow – Say Cheese; Tang Yeow – Mind Matters; Tang Yeow – Blessings 2; Cheong Yan Peng – Babies On Board	**Best Variety Research Writer**: **Loong Li Li – Taste of Love**; Teo Kim Kee – Taste of Nanyang; Wong Eng Hong – Home Dining; Rachel Han Xinru – GeTai Challenge 2018; Yu Jiazheng – SPOP SING! - Grand Final
**Best Variety Producer**: **Khow Hwai Teng**; Gan Bee Khim; Kang Lay See; Glen Lim	**Best Director**: **Doreen Yap Pei Kiang – Blessings 2**; Koh Siew Hui – VIC; Loo Yin Kam – Babies On Board; Loh Woon Woon – The Distance Between; Png Keh Hock – Fifty and Fabulous

=== Star Awards ===
The Nominees were announced on 8 February 2019.

Winners are listed first, highlighted in boldface.

**Best Drama Serial**: **Blessings 2**; A Million Dollar Dream; Say Cheese; VIC; You Can Be An Angel 3	**Best Short-Form Drama Serial**: **Love At Cavenagh Bridge**; Die Die Also Must Serve; Doppelganger - The Prequel; Love Across the Causeway; Till We Meet Again – Prequel
**Best Variety Programme**: **GeTai Challenge 2018**; By Your Side; Dennis Uncovers; Taste of Love; Thrift Hunters	**Best Short-Form Variety Programme**: **Workman Diaries**; At Your Service; Away With My BFF; Demystifying TV; Odd-upation
**Best Variety Special**: **SPOP SING! - Grand Final**; Community Chest Charity TV Show 2018; GeTai Challenge 2018 Grand Final; Lunar New Year's Eve Special 2018; Star Awards 2018	**Best Info-Ed Programme**: **Business As Usual**; Fixer 2; Forgotten Youths; Tuesday Report - #myconnectionsg2; Tuesday Report - When The Bell Rings 2
**Best Actor**: **Chen Hanwei - A Million Dollar Dream as Zhang Zicheng**; Christopher Lee - Doppelganger as Yang Liwei/Li Ruiming; Desmond Tan - You Can Be An Angel 3 as Xia Yaoyang Sunny; Qi Yuwu - Mind Matters as Zhuo Jinshu; Shaun Chen - Blessings 2 as Lian Xuegeng	**Best Actress**: **Zoe Tay - A Million Dollar Dream as Hu Jiaofen**; Carrie Wong - VIC as Zhan Yurou Vicky; Fann Wong - Doppelganger as Wang Siting; Joanne Peh - Say Cheese as Pan Zejia; Rebecca Lim - Blessings 2 as Chen Chunxian/Zhou Meiyue
**Best Supporting Actor**: **Chen Shucheng - A Million Dollar Dream as Hu Tianhao**; Andie Chen - My Agent is a Hero as Max; Ian Fang - Till We Meet Again as Shuai Ge; Shane Pow - Mind Matters as Hu Ruiming; Xu Bin - Doppelganger as Li Zijian	**Best Supporting Actress**: **Lin Mei Jiao - Fifty and Fabulous as Ma Keqing**; Aileen Tan - You Can Be An Angel 3 as Zhou Lilian; Cynthia Koh - Say Cheese as Pan Zeguo; He Ying Ying - A Million Dollar Dream as Zhang Yijing; Sheila Sim - Eat Already? 4 as Cheryl
**Best Programme Host**: **Quan Yi Fong - Fixer 2**; Bryan Wong - Hear Me Out 4; Chen Hanwei - Away With My BFF; Dennis Chew - Dennis Uncovers; Desmond Ng - Thrift Hunters	**Young Talent Award**: **Natalie Mae Tan - Blessings 2 as Bao Zhu**; Ethan Ng Kai En - Eat Already? 4 as Oliver; Ivan Lo Kai Jun - Mind Matters as Fang Zhixing; Jaylynn Lim Hui Xin You Can Be An Angel 3 as An An; Tay Kay Zer Cruz Dream Walker as Small Daren
**Best Theme Song**: **Kelvin Tan — You Can Be An Angel 3 -《守护你的善良》**; Lin Yuting and Wu Jia Ming - Blessings 2 -《月华》; Boon Hui Lu - Mind Matters -《给我一个》; The Freshman - Reach for the Skies -《和你交换你的不安》; Ling Kai - VIC -《Watch Me》	**Best Newcomer**: **Jasmine Sim - Doppelganger**; Angel Lim - Dream Walker; Joel Choo - A Million Dollar Dream; Kayly Loh - Dream Walker; Michelle Wong - Blessings 2
**Evergreen Artiste Award 常青演绎奖**: **Xiang Yun**; Aileen Tan; Chew Chor Meng; Marcus Chin; Richard Low

=== Special awards ===
The All-Time Favourite Artiste is a special achievement award given out to artiste(s) who have achieved a maximum of 10 popularity awards over 10 years.

**All-Time Favourite Artiste**	**Kym Ng**	1998 | 1999 | 2006 | 2007 | 2012 | 2013 | 2015 | 2016 | 2017 | 2018

**Special Achievement Award**	**Chew Chor Meng**

=== Top 10 Most Popular Artistes ===
Similar to last year's revision of format, a poll of 1,000 people representing a wide demographic across Singapore's population, conducted independently by an accredited market research company, will be used to identify the top 20 Male and Female artistes who will go on to the next round of public voting; this and the votes from telepoll and online voting as a measure of their fan support weighed 50% each.

The nominations were announced on 7 March 2019; the telepoll voting opened shortly at 3.00pm, while the Online voting opens a day later at 12.00pm. Voting closed on 14 April 2019, at 8.30pm, during the ceremony.

	Females
	Males
Italic	New to list (not nominated the previous year)
**Bold**	Top 10 winners
n	Recipient's accumulated number of awards
**10**	Recipient won his/her tenth Top 10 award and would be awarded the "All-time Favourite Artiste" on the following year's ceremony.

Stage:	Artistes	**Main Presentation**		
Stage:	Artistes	Top 18	Top 16	Top 10
**Top 10 Most Popular Female Artistes**
**1900-112-2001**	**Carrie Wong**			5
**1900-112-2002**	**Ya Hui**			4
**1900-112-2003**	Kimberly Chia			
**1900-112-2004**	**Jesseca Liu**			7
**1900-112-2005**	Jayley Woo			
**1900-112-2006**	Aileen Tan			
**1900-112-2007**	**Pan Lingling**			6
**1900-112-2008**	**Hong Huifang**			1
**1900-112-2009**	Sheila Sim			
**1900-112-2010**	**Chen Xiuhuan**			2
**1900-112-2011**	Lin Meijiao			
**1900-112-2012**	Hong Ling			
**1900-112-2013**	Dawn Yeoh			
**1900-112-2014**	**Rebecca Lim**			8
**1900-112-2015**	Bonnie Loo			
**1900-112-2016**	**Felicia Chin**			9
**1900-112-2017**	**Lina Ng**			2
**1900-112-2018**	Cynthia Koh			
**1900-112-2019**	Lin Pei Fen			
**1900-112-2020**	**Paige Chua**			5
Stage:	Artistes	**Main Presentation**		
Stage:	Artistes	Top 18	Top 16	Top 10
**Top 10 Most Popular Male Artistes**
**1900-112-2021**	Rayson Tan			
**1900-112-2022**	Zhang Yaodong			
**1900-112-2023**	**Chen Shucheng**			1
**1900-112-2024**	**Pierre Png**			3
**1900-112-2025**	Lee Teng			
**1900-112-2026**	**Romeo Tan**			5
**1900-112-2027**	Andie Chen			
**1900-112-2028**	Yao Wenlong			
**1900-112-2029**	Guo Liang			
**1900-112-2030**	**Dasmond Koh**			**10**
**1900-112-2031**	**Dennis Chew**			9
**1900-112-2032**	Marcus Chin			
**1900-112-2033**	**Desmond Tan**			4
**1900-112-2034**	**Pornsak**			8
**1900-112-2035**	Richard Low			
**1900-112-2036**	Chua En Lai			
**1900-112-2037**	**Zheng Geping**			9
**1900-112-2038**	**Shaun Chen**			3
**1900-112-2039**	Terence Cao			
**1900-112-2040**	**Zhu Houren**			1

=== Multiple awards and nominations ===
Dramas that received multiple nominations
Nominations	Drama/Short-Form Drama
8	Blessings 2 祖先保佑2
6	A Million Dollar Dream 给我一百万
5	You Can Be An Angel 3 你也可以是天使3
5	Mind Matters 心。情
4	Say Cheese 西瓜甜不甜
4	VIC 维多利亚的模力
3	Doppelganger 入侵者
2	Eat Already? S4 吃饱没?4
2	Dream Walker 梦行者
2	Babies On Board 新生
2	Fifty And Fabulous 五零高手

Programmes that received multiple nominations
Nominations	Programme/Short-Form Programme/Variety Special
3	GeTai Challenge 2018 歌台星力量 兴旺发
2	Fixer 2 线人2
2	Dennis Uncovers 周公找茶
2	Away With My BFF 老友出走记
2	Taste of Love 两代美味关系
2	SPOP SING! - Grand Final SPOP听我唱！- 大决赛
2	Star Awards 2018 红星大奖 2018

Dramas that received multiple awards
Wins	Drama/Short-Form Drama
3	A Million Dollar Dream 给我一百万
3	Blessings 2 祖先保佑2

Programmes that received multiple awards
Wins	Programme/Short-Form Programme/Variety Special
N/A

== Presenters and performers ==
Creative achievement awards ceremony

Name(s)	Role
Doreen Yeoh (Chief Content Officer)	Presenter of the judges segment in the Creative Achievement Award
Tham Loke Kheng 谭乐琼 (CEO of MediaCorp)	Gave out the award for Best Screenplay, Best Director, Best Variety Research Writer, Best Variety Producer

Presenters

Lists of Presenters' names were announced on 3 April 2019.

Name(s)	Role
Lucy Chow 周如珠	Announcer for Star Awards 2019
Quan Yi Fong 权怡凤	Gave A Opening Monologue of Star Awards 2019
Past recipients of Young Talent awards (from left to right): Li Xian Min 李咸愍; Jason Liang 梁世杰; Kyle Chan 陈星余; Regene Lim 林詠谊; Tan Jun Sheng 陈俊生; Lyn Oh Ling En 胡菱恩; Damien Teo 张值豪; Isabel Yamada 山田熙; Toh Xin Hui 杜芯慧	Presenters of the award for Young Talent Award
Lan Cheng Long 蓝正龙; Elvin Ng 黄俊雄	Presenter of the awards for Best Short-form Drama Serial and Best Short-form Variety Programme
Joyce Cheng 郑欣宜; Kaiser Chuang 庄凯勋	Presenter of the award for Best Newcomer
Roger Kwok 郭晋安	Presenter of the award for Best Evergreen Artiste
Tony Sun 孙协志; Kym Ng 鐘琴	Presenter of the award for Best Info-ed Programme and Best Variety Programme
Bowie Tsang 曾宝仪	Presenter of the award for Best Variety Special and Best Programme Host
Eric Chou 周兴哲	Presenter of the award for Best Theme Song
Mediacorp CEO; Tham Loke Kheng 谭乐琼	Gave out the award for All-time favourite artiste
Fann Wong 范文芳; Roger Kwok 郭晋安	Presenter of the award for Best Support Actor and Best Supporting Actress
Chen Hanwei 陈汉玮; Zoe Tay 郑惠玉	Presenter of the award for Best Drama Serial
Ong Ye Kung 王乙康 (Minister of Education)	Gave out the award for Special Achievement Award
Jerry Yan 言承旭; Wu Jinyan 吴谨言	Presenter of the award for Best Actor and Best Actress
Cecilia Cheung 张柏芝; Quan Yi Fong 权怡凤	Presenter of the award for Top 10 Most Popular Female and Male Artistes

Performers

Name(s)	Show	Performances
Daryl-Ann Jansen 莉玉; Jarrell Ng 黄俊融; Marcus Tay 郑俊杰; Karena Yeo 杨凯玲	Creative Achievement	Performed 《星光》 (Star Awards Theme Song) (Original singers)
Bonnie Loo 罗美仪; Desmond Ng 黄振隆	Creative Achievement	Performed《每天为你唱歌》(from How Are You?/Ho Seh Bo?)
Daryl-Ann Jansen 莉玉; Marcus Tay 郑俊杰; Karena Yeo 杨凯玲; Jarrell Ng 黄俊融; All SPOP Sing! finalists	Walk-of-fame	Performed the Best Theme Song nominations (in order): 《月华》(from Blessings 2 祖先保佑2); 《给我一个》(from Mind Matters 心。情); 《Watch Me》(from VIC 维多利亚的模力); 《守护你的善良》(from You Can Be An Angel 3 你也可以是天使3); 《和你交换你的不安》(from Reach for the Skies 不平凡的平凡)
Desmond Tan 陈泂江; Zoe Tay 郑惠玉; Chen Han Wei 陈汉玮; Rebecca Lim 林慧玲	Main Show	Performed 《星光》
Xu Bin 徐彬; Timothee Yap 叶劲维; Zong Zijie 宗子杰; Gavin Teo 崇喆	Main Show	Performed 《小人物的心声》in memoriam to Aloysius Pang
Eric Chou 周兴哲	Main Show	Performed 《如果雨之后》and《怎么了》
All SPOP Sing! finalists	Main Show	Performed 《星光》

== Ceremony ==
The show opens with a cold open containing references to nominations for Best Drama Serial starring Quan Yi Fong (first watching a video snippet from VIC), who time-traveled back to 1918 (referencing Blessings 2) and phone-calling three other characters (from Say Cheese, You Can Be An Angel 3 and A Million Dollar Dream, in order of appearance) before recalling how the main protagonist returning to her own time (by throwing a rock and sunk along with her) and arrived at the stage to begin the show. After the opening, Quan brought references from past ceremonies while asking celebrities (in order of appearance, 1994 (Hosts Chen Shucheng and Yvette Tsui, as well as Fann Wong and Christopher Lee's dialogues), 2014 (Quan tripped while making her way to receive her award) and 2015 (Jeanette Aw's fall before accepting her All-Time Favourite Artiste), followed by Marcus Chin parodying the Love 97.2FM's theme tune while asking whether any celebrities can recall the 1994 theme tune).

In the midst of the ceremony, several Star Search contestants and artistes performed a walk-in skit. Following the skit, it was revealed by Quan, one of the hosts in the then-recent tenth season, that the eleventh season of Star Search would return after a nine-year hiatus, with open auditions to commence on 4 and 12 May. The segment ends with a teaser featuring the first season winner Zoe Tay.

=== Changes to award categories ===
The Best Short-form Drama Serial and Best Short-form Variety Programme were introduced this year to highlight short series (usually web series from Toggle) that have two or more episodes with a total running time of at least 150 minutes, and the series must tell a complete, non-recurring story, and not have an ongoing storyline or main characters from the actual series.

The Best Variety Special award returned after it was not presented last year.

=== Tribute to Aloysius Pang ===
A segment was dedicated to Aloysius Pang who had died during military training earlier on 23 January that year while the Honorary TV Award, an award presented to artistes posthumously, was not awarded to Pang. Producer Elaine See later explained that the decision for the Honorary TV Award was not "intentional" and it was different from the circumstances from Huang Wenyong, who had received nominations prior to his death.

== Accolade ==
Organisation	Year	Category	Result	Ref
Star Awards	2021	Best Variety Special 最佳综艺特备节目	Won	
