= Reunion dinner =

Celebration tradition in China and Vietnam

A reunion dinner (Chinese: 團圓飯, Chinese: 年夜饭, 团年饭 or 团圆饭; Vietnamese: Tất niên) is held on Chinese New Year's Eve, Chinese New Year and Vietnamese New Year, during which family members get together to celebrate. It is often considered the most important get-together meal of the entire year.

== Typical menu ==
The Chinese New Year's Eve, Chinese New Year and Vietnamese New Year reunion dinner is very large and traditionally includes dumplings, chicken, pork or seafood. Fish (魚, yú; Vietnamese: Con cá) is also included, but intentionally (except for Vietnam) not finished, and the remaining fish is stored overnight. The reason for this stems from a pun, as the Chinese phrase 年年有魚/餘; (nián nián yǒu yú, or "every year there is fish/leftover") is a homophone for phrases which mean "be blessed every year" or "have abundant profit every year". Similarly, a type of black hair-like algae, "fat choy" (髮菜, fǎ cài, literally "hair vegetable" in Chinese), is also featured in many dishes since its name sounds similar to "prosperity"(發財, fā cái). Hakka will serve "kiu nyuk" 扣肉 and "ngiong tiu fu" 釀豆腐. The belief is that having one will lead to the other, as the phrases sound similar to one another.

== See also ==
- List of dining events
