= The Heartland Hero =

- 邻里帮
- Genre: Drama
- Starring: Elvin Ng; Shane Pow (ep. 1-31); James Seah (ep. 35-130); Paige Chua; Bonnie Loo; Chew Chor Meng; Vivian Lai; Benjamin Tan; Bryan Wong; Ian Fang; Goh Wee-Ann; Jernelle Oh
- Country of origin: Singapore
- Original language: Mandarin
- No. of episodes: 130

Production
- Executive producer: Leong Lye Lin

Original release
- Network: Mediacorp Channel 8
- Release: September 1, 2021 – March 4, 2022

The Heartland Hero (Chinese: 邻里帮) is a Singaporean drama produced and telecast on Mediacorp Channel 8. It stars Elvin Ng, James Seah, Paige Chua, Bonnie Loo, Chew Chor Meng, Vivian Lai, Benjamin Tan, Bryan Wong, Ian Fang and Jernelle Oh.

The series initially starred Shane Pow, who was replaced by James Seah after his contract with Mediacorp was terminated in beginning of May 2021.

== Cast ==
=== Main ===
- Elvin Ng as Mao-ge
  - Zong Zijie as Young Mao-ge
- Shane Pow as Zhong Yiyuan (ep. 1-31)
- James Seah as Zhong Yiyuan (ep. 35-130)
- Paige Chua as Bao Qingtian
  - Kiki Lim as Young Qingtian
- Bonnie Loo as Sophie
- Chew Chor Meng as Zhong Buzhang
- Vivian Lai as Lexi
- Benjamin Tan as Jeremy
- Bryan Wong as Bao Daowang
- Ian Fang as Satay King
- Goh Wee-Ann as Zhong Li
- Jernelle Oh as Chai Lai Niratpattanasai

=== Recurring ===
- Rui En as Qiu Jingwen
- Desmond Ng as Fang Zhongcheng
- Zoe Tay as Thailuck Thabarabasi
- Zhu Houren as Li Longchen
- Jayley Woo
- He Ying Ying

=== Guest ===
- Priscelia Chan
- Zhai Siming
- Alfred Sim
- Juin Teh
- Lin Ruping
- Xiang Yun
- Guo Liang
- Pan Lingling
- Chase Tan
- Nurul Aini
- Fauzie Laily
- Kym Ng
- Jeffrey Xu
- Hong Ling
- Ye Shipin
- Zhu Xiufeng
- Eelyn Kok
- Adele Wong
- Xu Bin
- Chantalle Ng
- Zheng Geping
- Ong Ai Leng
- JJ Neo
- Sheryl Ang
- Foo Fang Rong
- Nick Teo
- Regene Lim
- Sheila Sim
- Herman Keh
- Zhang Zhen Xuan
- Chen Shucheng
- Gao Mei Gui
- Denise Camillia Tan
- Ke Le
- Glenn Yong
- Chen Huihui
- Allan Wu
- Jin Yinji
- Rayson Tan
- Tan Chuan-Jin
