= Babies on Board =

2018 Chinese-language television drama

- 新生
- Genre: Drama; romance; family; pregnancy
- Written by: 张彦平 Cheong Yan Peng
- Directed by: 卢燕金 Loo Yin Kam 陈稖元 Chen Bang Yuan
- Starring: Tay Ping Hui; Jesseca Liu; Ya Hui; Terence Cao; Hong Huifang
- Opening theme: 爱以外的意外 by Lin Sitong and Tay Ping Hui
- Ending theme: 借来的亲人 by Lin Sitong
- Country of origin: Singapore
- Original language: Chinese
- No. of episodes: 22

Production
- Executive producer: 黄光荣 Wong Kuang Yong
- Running time: approx. 45 minutes (excluding advertisements)

Original release
- Network: Mediacorp Channel 8
- Release: 7 May – 5 June 2018

Babies on Board (Chinese: 新生) is a Chinese television drama that airs on the Singaporean television channel Mediacorp Channel 8 on weeknights. It stars Tay Ping Hui, Jesseca Liu, Ya Hui, Terence Cao and Hong Huifang as the cast of this series.

== Cast ==
- Tay Ping Hui as Sun Zhihui 孙智辉
- Jesseca Liu as Peng Shiyun 彭诗韵
- Ya Hui as Li Xinyue 李心悦. Ya Hui wore a fake belly, made of cotton and silicone, under her clothes for the show.
- Lin Daorui 林道锐 as Sun Kangyue 孙康悦
  - Baby version portrayed by Soo Kexin 苏可昕
- Kayly Loh 卢传瑾 as Sun Yun'en 孙芸恩
- Darius Tan 陈日成 as Wang Zhenqiang 王振强
- Xu Xuanya 许绚雅 as Wang Ruoling 王若灵
- Ryan Lian as Peng Weide 彭伟德
- Shine Koh 高慧姍 as Coco
- Scarlet Emerie Toh as Emma Pang
- Andrew Lua 赖泰均 as Huang Xinbo 黄莘博
- Rao Zijie 饶梓杰 as Ray Zhang
- Michelle Wong as Zhang Rongxuan 张蓉萱
- Hong Huifang as Huang Lifeng 黄丽凤
- Larry Low 刘龙伟 as Luo Fucheng 罗富城
- He Xueluan 何雪銮 as Luo Meixi 罗美希
- Mei Xin as Zheng Meifang 郑美芳
- Terence Cao as Edmund Goh
- Ben Yeo as Yang Yihao 杨毅豪
- Eelyn Kok as Ann
- Yap Huixin 叶慧馨 as Niki
- Hazelle Teo 张颖双 as Joey
- Gao Meigui 高美贵 as Gia Zhu Yuzhu 朱玉珠
- Doreen Chu 朱玉叶 as Caiying 菜英
- Dennis Toh 卓庆成 as Chen Lida 陈立达
- Shu Yi 舒怡 as Ruan Mingming 阮明明
- Alicia Lo 卢予萱 as Xiaowen 晓雯
- Adele Wong as Connie
- Louis Wu 伍洛毅 as Chaojie 超杰
- Terence Tay 郑仲伟 as Eric
- Christian Lamprecht as Jason

== Production ==
The show's scriptwriter is Cheong Yan Pen and executive producer is Wong Kuang Yong.

== Original soundtrack (OST) ==
No.	Song title	Singer(s)
1	"爱以外的意外"	Lin Sitong 林思彤 and Tay Ping Hui
2	"借来的亲人"	Lin Sitong 林思彤

== Review ==
Li Ho Ai of The Straits Times felt that the show boldly tackles the topic of surrogacy while showing that old societal expectations that a wife is duty-bound to bear children remain. Li also felt scriptwriter Cheong Yan Peng wrote a clever script contrasting the pregnancy situations of various groups and having a woman saving the day instead of stereotyping the genders.

== Accolades ==
Organisation	Year	Category	Nominee(s)	Result	Ref.
Star Awards	2019	Best Screenplay	Cheong Yan Peng 张彦平	Nominated	
Star Awards	2019	Best Director	Loo Yin Kam 卢燕金	Nominated	
