= It Takes Two (Singaporean TV series) =

2012 Singaporean television series

- 对对碰
- Genre: Family; Dramedy
- Written by: 洪荣狄 Ang Eng Tee
- Directed by: 方家福 Png Keh Hock 叶佩娟 Doreen Yap 胡凉财 Oh Liang Cai 谢益文 Edmund Tse 苏妙芳
- Starring: Yao Wenlong; Kym Ng; Chen Hanwei; Ann Kok; Zheng Geping
- Opening theme: 轧 by Derrick Hoh and Kelvin Tan
- Ending theme: 以为 by Kelvin Tan
- Country of origin: Singapore
- Original language: Chinese
- No. of episodes: 34

Production
- Producer: 张龙敏 Chong Liung Man
- Running time: approx. 45 minutes

Original release
- Network: MediaCorp Channel 8
- Release: 6 November – 21 December 2012

It Takes Two (Chinese: 对对碰) is a 2012 Singaporean Chinese year-end blockbuster drama produced by MediaCorp TV. It stars Yao Wenlong, Kym Ng, Chen Hanwei, Ann Kok and Zheng Geping as the cast of the series. It is currently telecast on Singapore's free-to-air channel, MediaCorp Channel 8. It made its debut on 6 November 2012 and consists of 34 episodes, screened on every weekday night at 9:00pm.

== Plot ==
In a block of 4-room flats at a particular housing estate in Bedok, the two families of Hao Youcai and Niu Wuyin live opposite each other. As business rivals, sparks occasionally fly between them. Youcai's name may mean "wealthy", but he often has no luck with money. On the other hand, the overbearing Wuyin or "penniless" does not only enjoy a thriving business but he has the Midas touch as well. He is certainly loaded with "pounds".

An honest and kind man, Youcai does not have the gift of the gab but is tolerant as far as possible. However, his wife Luona has a vicious tongue that spares nobody for no rhyme or reason. On top of that, she covets wealth and power, despising her low-earning husband. She is tyrannical and harsh towards her 70-year-old mother-in-law. Wuyin's septuagenarian father, however, has a "blessed" life. His son and daughter-in-law treasure him. When he moans about his aching body, a massage chair worth a few thousand dollars is delivered immediately to the house. Youcai's mother can only drool in envy. Wuyin has a way with people and he is eloquent. He remains "refined" even in a quarrel, defusing any tense situation with a soft touch. Money is his life, and he can never earn enough. He is ever ready to perform good deeds, but not when they demand his money. Hardworking and frugal, his wife Xiuhua is not one to complain.

Both families sell handmade fishball noodles at their stalls at Blk 216 Bedok Market and Hawker Centre. "Niuji" stall enjoys brisk business while "Haoji" stall suffers from poor business.

The sight of the other party decked in jewellery while she is pathetically bare in that aspect makes Luona moan all day to the extent that she pinches her mother-in-law out of spite. Unfortunately, the "act of violence" is captured on camera by her daughter and uploaded to YouTube. It even hits the headlines. In no time, people are demanding that she be punished and going on a hunt to ferret out this wicked woman. Youcai is aware that the culprit is his wife and loses his cool. Instead of being remorseful, Luona flies into a fury. She leaves home with her daughter, threatening to engage a lawyer to initiate divorce proceedings.

Disillusioned, Youcai reaches the point of contemplating suicide but is stopped by his mother. To console her son, she fabricates a story that a deity appeared in her dream to prophesize that his hardship days will soon be over. The deity also bestowed on her a "good luck rice bin" (which is actually a junk she retrieved from the rubbish dump) and promised that the rice bin would always be full and that his life would be free from worry.

Whether it is his filial piety that moves the Heaven or it is simply mere coincidence, Youcai's luck changes for the better the moment his wicked wife leaves home. His fish balls are favoured by a renowned chef and he is invited to appear on TV. He becomes famous overnight. Customers begin to stream towards his stall. Wuyin's business is badly affected and a series of misfortune befalls him. It appears that the wheel of fortune has turned. With Lady Luck smiling on him, Youcai enters a lucky draw and wins a car. Soon, the story of how the "prosperous rice bin" changes his fortune starts to circulate to the point of becoming a legend. Despite Youcai's mother frantically explaining that it is purely nonsense perpetuated by her, nobody is convinced. Hordes of people flock to the rice bin to "seek fortune and lottery numbers". Luona banishes the thought of divorce upon hearing of it. She wants to return home to be a virtuous wife and a filial daughter-in-law. Wuyin, who is down on his luck, actually plans to steal Youcai's "prosperous rice bin"...

Apart from these two families, this drama has a slew of interesting characters, including the "manager" whose job is to assist a loan shark in hosting "overseas talents" (foreign runners); the "Yong Tau Foo Beauty" and her 20-year-old only son who still relies on his mother to trim his nails; the fengshui master who is a quack; new immigrants married to locals who are eager to assimilate into the country; "opposition parties" fond of exaggerating for the shock effect and who "opposes" everything; the Fish Prince who is unfazed by his lowly status but believes that he who tills diligently will reap a bountiful harvest, etc. The stories of these people reflect the everyday issues currently confronting Singaporeans. For example, the hardship imposed on ordinary citizens as a result of the rising cost of living; indulging the next generation and making it even more difficult for children to face challenges; the impact that an aging population has on society; the marginalization of grassroot communities; the widening gulf between people... The 34-episode drama provides light entertainment while pinpointing current issues in a heartwarming and down-to-earth portrayal.

== Cast ==
- Yao Wenlong as Hao Youcai 郝有财
- Kym Ng as Luo Na 罗娜, Hao Youcai's wife
- Jin Yinji as Lin Jinzhi 林金枝, Hao Youcai's mother.
- Zheng Geping as Hao Youfu 郝有福, Hao Youcai's younger brother who is a loan shark.
- Shine Koh 高慧珊 as Hao Meiying 郝美英, Hao Youcai's daughter.
- Aloysius Pang as Hao Zhi Jie 郝志杰, Hao Youcai's son
- Oh Ling En 胡菱恩 as Hao Meishan 郝美山, Hao Youcai's daughter.
- Chen Hanwei as Niu Wuyin 牛无银
- Chen Huihui as Zhang Xiuhua 张秀花
- Zhu Houren as Niu's dad 牛老爸
- Oon Shu An as Sisi
- Shane Pow as B Niu B牛
- Fang Rong as Niu Xin Hui 牛欣惠
- Ann Kok as Vivian
- Lin Liyun as Vivian's mother
- Hong Huifang as Aunt Kopi 咖啡嫂, the owner of the coffee stall at Blk 216 Bedok Market and Hawker Centre
- Pan Lingling as Zhang Ling 张玲, the owner of the flower stall at Blk 216 Bedok Market and Hawker Centre
- Chen Guohua as Watermelon Ming 西瓜明, the owner of the fruit stall at Blk 216 Bedok Market and Hawker Centre
- Chen Tianwen as Cai Jinlong 蔡金龙
- Rayson Tan as Zhang Yang 张扬, a loan shark and also bodyguard for South Korean girl group known as Skarf.
- Li Mei Jiao as Amy, the owner of the yong tau foo stall at Blk 216 Bedok Market and Hawker Centre
- Jerry Yeo as Ryan, the gangster boss
- Romeo Tan as Fish Prince 鱼王子, the owner and fishmonger of the fish stall at Blk 216 Bedok Market and Hawker Centre
- Tracy Lee as Xu Jie 徐洁
- Xavier Ong as David
- Xu Bin as Tony
- Kimberly Chia as Xueli 雪丽
- Louis C.Hillyard as Benny
- Scott C.Hillyard as Aloysius
- Dick Su 苏才忠 as Mr Chong
- Skarf as themselves in a cameo appearance in 2 episodes
- Ho Tien Tsai as Octavia
- Teo Ser Lee 张思丽 as Angela
- Li Wenhai as Master Hong, a fortune teller
- Seth Ang 翁兴昂 as Host of reality show House Full of Joy.
- Vivian Lai as a TV host
- Ben Yeo as a TV host
- Wang Yuqing as Fang Weijie 方伟杰, a medical doctor.

== Production ==
This is one of two anniversary dramas (the other being period drama Joys of Life) produced in conjunction with MediaCorp's celebration of 30 years of local Chinese drama. Filming started on 4 July 2012 and ended by October 2012. Trailers started screening as of 9 October 2012.

== Reception ==
It Takes Two was the second drama to beat the 1-million viewership mark, beating Don't Stop Believin' to gain the mark before the finale on 21 December (episode 34).

== Accolades ==
Organisation	Year	Category	Nominee / Work	Result	Ref
Star Awards	2013	Young Talent Award	Lyn Oh 胡菱恩	Won	
Star Awards	2013	Best Theme Song	轧 (performed by Derrick Hoh and Kelvin Tan)	Nominated	
Star Awards	2013	Best Director	Doreen Yap	Nominated	
Star Awards	2013	Best Screenplay	Ang Eng Tee	Nominated	
Star Awards	2013	Favourite Male Character	Aloysius Pang	Nominated	
Star Awards	2013	Favourite Male Character	Romeo Tan	Nominated	
Star Awards	2013	Favourite Female Character	Ann Kok	Nominated	
Star Awards	2013	Favourite Onscreen Couple (Drama)	Zheng Geping and Ann Kok	Nominated	
Star Awards	2013	Best Actress	Kym Ng	Nominated	
Star Awards	2013	Best Supporting Actor	Rayson Tan	Nominated	
Star Awards	2013	Best Supporting Actress	Jin Yinji	Nominated	
Star Awards	2013	Best Newcomer	Shane Pow	Nominated	

== See also ==
- List of programmes broadcast by Mediacorp Channel 8
