= James Seah =

Singaporean actor

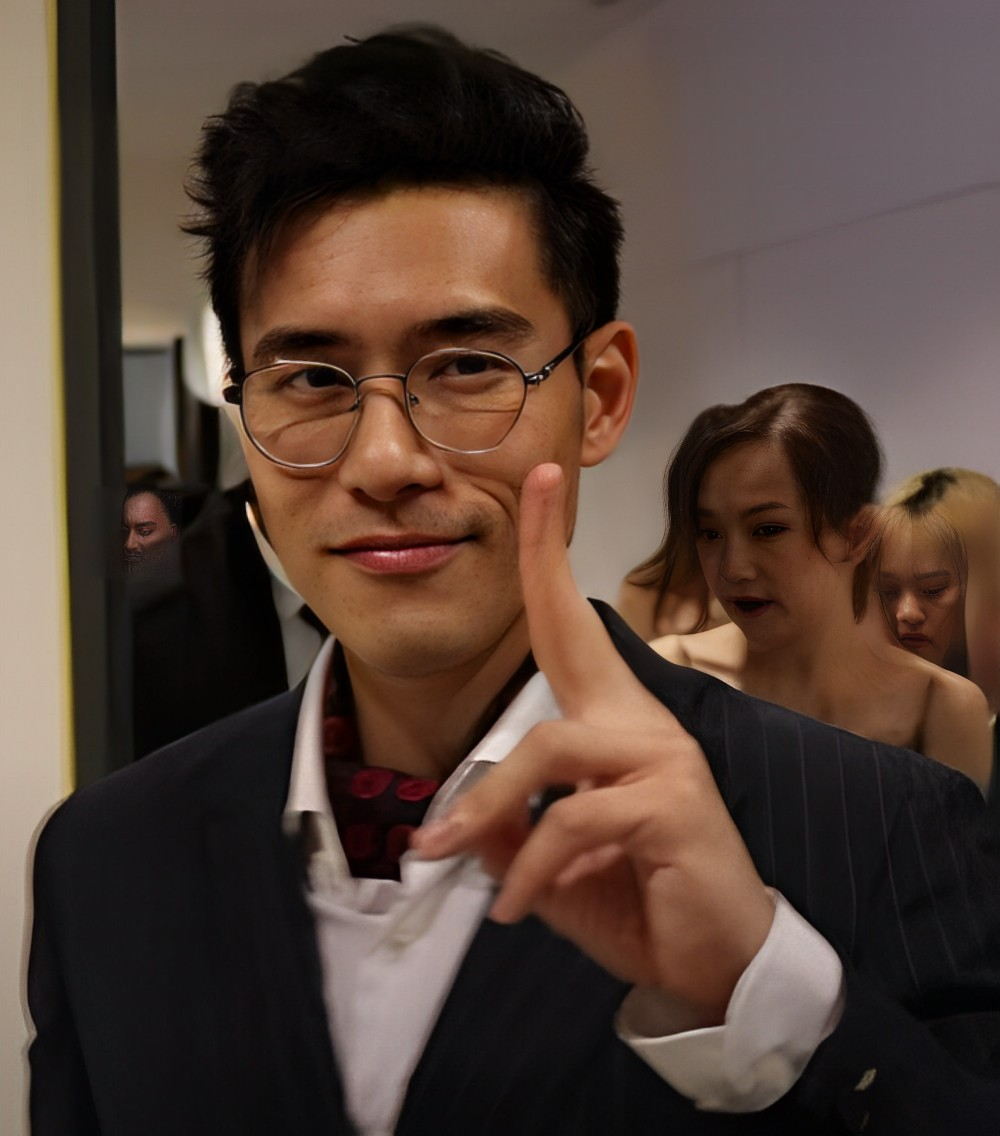
- Seah at the Star Awards 2017
- Born: James Seah Hong Hui; Singapore
- Education: Nanyang Polytechnic
- Occupations: Actor; businessman
- Years active: 2010–present
- Spouse: Nicole Chang Min (m. 2022)

Stage name
- Traditional Chinese: 謝俊峰
- Simplified Chinese: 谢俊峰
- Hanyu Pinyin: Xiè Jùnfēng

Birth name
- Traditional Chinese: 謝宏輝
- Simplified Chinese: 谢宏辉
- Hanyu Pinyin: Xiè Hónghuī

James Seah Hong Hui is a Singaporean actor best known for starring in the television drama The Heartland Hero. He has also starred in the television dramas Hello From the Other Side, My One in a Million, Loving You, Mind Jumper, The Unbreakable Bond, Tanglin and Soul Detective, in the film 1965 and in the web series Let's Play Love.

== Career ==
Seah was a finalist on Star Search in 2010. He starred in the web series Let's Play Love in 2011. He appeared in the 2013 television dramas 96°C Café and Mata Mata. He appeared in The Caregivers in 2014. In 2015, he starred in the historical thriller film 1965 and the television drama The Journey: Our Homeland. He starred in the television drama Tanglin, which aired from 2015 to 2018.

In 2019, he starred in the television dramas My One in a Million and Hello From the Other Side.

Seah appeared in the 2021 television dramas Mind Jumper, Key Witness , Loving You, and Justice Boo. He replaced Shane Pow on the television drama The Heartland Hero, which aired from 2021 to 2022.

In 2022, he starred in the television dramas Soul Detective and The Unbreakable Bond .

== Personal life ==
Seah is married to influencer Nicole Chang Min.

Seah owns a gym centre named The Garage.

== Filmography ==
=== Television series ===
Year	Title	Role	Notes	Ref.
2011	Let's Play Love	Chengxi	Webseries	
2013	96°C Café	Ziwei		
2013	Marry Me	Fire		
2013	Mata Mata	Kwong Weng		
2014	The Caregivers	Yang Haoran		
2014	Who Killed The Lead	Hong Xiaosheng		
2014	Against the Tide	Jacob Thang		
2015–2018	Tanglin	Chris Tong		
2015	Families on the Edge	Cheng Weiguang	Docudrama	
2015	Blissful Living	Xu Junming	Docudrama	
2015	The Journey: Our Homeland	Yan Yimin		
2016	Hero	Chen Bangqing		
2017	When Duty Calls	Xie Mingyao		
2018	Fifty & Fabulous	Wang Qilong		
2018	Trendsetters	Jordan Phua	Toggle online series	
2019	C.L.I.F. 5	Lu Jiahao		
2019	My One in a Million	Yan Shuze		
2019	Hello From the Other Side	Fang Kewei		
2019	Jalan Jalan	Guo Haoyang		
2020	The Right Time			
2020	Loving You	Chen Ming		
2020	Happy Prince	Chen Weijun		
2021	Justice Boo	Justice Bao	Pilot for premiere project	
2021	Key Witness	Dex		
2021	Mind Jumper	Zhao Zhengyi		
2021–2022	The Heartland Hero	Zhong Yiyuan	Ep.35–130	
2022	The Unbreakable Bond	Gu Yunze		
2022	Soul Detective	Bai Ye		
2023	Fix My Life	Fan Shede		
2023	The Sky is Still Blue	Wu Huoyao		
2025	Another Wok of Life			

=== Film ===
Year	Title	Role	Notes	Ref.
2015	1965	Seng		
2015	Two Boys and A Mermaid	Young James	Telemovie	
2026	Ah Girl	Ah pa		

== Awards and nominations ==
Organisation	Year	Category	Nominated work	Result	Ref.
Star Awards	2021	Top 10 Most Popular Male Artistes	—N/a	Nominated	
Star Awards	2023	Top 10 Most Popular Male Artistes	—N/a	Nominated	
Star Awards	2024	Top 10 Most Popular Male Artistes	—N/a	Won	
Star Awards	2025	Top 10 Most Popular Male Artistes	—N/a	Nominated	
Star Awards	2026	Best Supporting Actor	Another Wok of Life	Nominated	
