= Maureen Sariki =

President of Honiara market vendors' association

Maureen Sariki is a market vendor, and president of the Honiara market vendors' association, from the Solomon Islands.

Sariki joined the executive committee of the Honiara Central Market Vendors Association in 2014, and was elected president in 2016. The association has 375 members, 95% of whom are women. Sakriki's focus is on strengthening relationships between vendors and market management. As a result, the local government decided to include women market vendors in the development of market budgets and plans. In addition, fundraising activities have resulted in the provision of temporary shelters to protect produce and vendors from the elements.

In 2017, Sariki attended the 13th Triennial Conference of Pacific Women and 6th Meeting of Pacific Ministers for Women. Also in 2017, Sariki and the association executive were awarded the Australian High Commissioner’s International Women’s Day Award for their leadership and inclusive decision-making for market vendors in Solomon Islands.
