= Fix My Life =

2023 Singaporean television series

- Promotional poster
- Chinese: 整你的人生
- Literal meaning: "Arrange Your Life"
- Hanyu Pinyin: Zhěng nǐ de rénshēng
- Genre: Drama
- Screenplay by: Zeng Xianning
- Directed by: Zhang Huiying
- Starring: James Seah; Hong Ling
- Opening theme: "Throw" by The Freshman
- Ending theme: "It's Me" by Gao Mei Gui; "Yi Lai" by James Seah
- Country of origin: Singapore
- Original language: Mandarin
- No. of seasons: 1
- No. of episodes: 20

Production
- Executive producer: Luo Wenwen
- Cinematography: Lee Xingshun
- Editors: Huang Yuping; Mo Shimin
- Running time: 46 minutes
- Production company: Mediacorp

Original release
- Network: Channel 8
- Release: 15 February – 14 March 2023

Fix My Life (Chinese: 整你的人生) is a 2023 Singaporean drama series starring James Seah and Hong Ling. The series was broadcast on Mediacorp Channel 8 on weeknights 9pm from 15 February 2023 to 14 March 2023.

== Synopsis ==
Yuan Manying, a young woman who holds multiple part-time jobs at the same time, meets disparate Fan Shede while working as a journalist for a publication. Together they start a business to help clients declutter their home by disposing of obsolete items.

== Cast ==
- James Seah as Fan Shede
  - Huang Shirui as young Fan Shede
- Hong Ling as Yuan Manying
- Peter Yu as Liu Shirong
- Dawn Yeoh as Jieru
- Cavin Soh as Lee Qihuan
- Kayly Loh as He Yilan
- Desmond Ng as Fang Like
- Jasmine Sim as Luna
- Nick Teo as Zhou Andao
- Cynthia Koh as Ma Lulu
- Liu Lingling as Aunt Hong
- Zhai Siming as Weng Jianhao
- Seow Sin Nee as Jingwen
- Aileen Tan as Aunt Ling
- Chen Xi as Zicheng
- Michelle Wong as Huiyun
- Zhang Yaodong as Yang Feifan
- Chew Chor Meng as Feng Sheng
- Lina Ng as Manying's mother
- Zhu Xiufeng as Aunt Yuan
- Lyu Linxuan as Leon
- Wang Chang Li as Yilan's father
- Yan Bingliang as Lulu's father
- Damien Teo as Yichao

== Awards and nominations ==
Year	Ceremony	Category	Nominees	Result	Ref
2023	ContentAsia Awards	Best Sound Design for an Asian TV Programme/Series	Fix My Life	Nominated	
