= I Want to Be a Star =

2016 Singaporean TV series

- 小咖大作战
- Genre: Drama; Entertainment; Comedy; Romance
- Written by: 洪汐 Rebecca Leow
- Directed by: 方傢福 Png Keh Hock
- Starring: Chew Chor Meng 周初明; Shane Pow 包勋评; Kym Ng 钟琴; Hong Ling 洪凌; Dennis Chew 周崇慶; Ya Hui 雅慧
- Opening theme: 路人 by Ya Hui
- Ending theme: 咖喱菲 by Ya Hui, Hong Ling, Dennis Chew & Shane Pow
- Country of origin: Singapore
- Original language: Mandarin
- No. of episodes: 12

Production
- Producer: 王尤红 Winnie Wong
- Running time: approx. 24 minutes

Original release
- Network: Toggle
- Release: 25 December 2016 – 2 April 2017

Related
- Yes Mdm!; Soul Reaper

I Want to Be a Star (Chinese: 小咖大作战) is a Toggle original series drama which is shown on Toggle. The show depicts the life of a calefare and rising to fame as actors and actresses of Mediacorp. It stars Chew Chor Meng, Shane Pow, Kym Ng, Hong Ling, Dennis Chew, Ya Hui as the main cast of the series. Channel 8 began airing the series every Sunday at 10.30pm from 25 December 2016.

== Plot ==
Da Tian opens a calefare agency. Edgar, Fei Mei, Gao Mei, Fa Ge, and Ru Hua all start off as extras in films. Soon, Gao Mei gets her friend Mei Yi to join. Mei Yi and Di Long fall in love. Edgar starts to fall in love with Gao Mei but it is not reciprocated.

== Cast ==
=== Main cast ===
Cast	Role	Description	Episode Appeared
Chew Chor Meng 周初明	Zhong Da Tian 钟大天	Doraemon (小叮当); Dad (老爸); Boss of Da Tian Calefare Agency; Zhong Di Long's father; In love with Hong Baobao	1 - 6, 10 - 12
Shane Pow 包勋评	Zhong Di Long 钟狄龙	Small Boss (小老板): Zhong Da Tian's son; Zhang Mei Yi's love interest	1 - 12
Kym Ng 钟琴	Hong Bao Bao 洪宝宝	Zhong Da Tian's friend and love interest; Calefare turned actress	4, 8, 11
Hong Ling 洪凌	Zhang Mei Yi 张美仪	Gao Mei's best friend; Dreams to be a singer; Zhong Di Long 's love interest	1 - 12
Dennis Chew 周崇庆	Edgar	Zhong Di Long's Friend; Comes from rich family; Dream to be an actor; Fan of Juilet & Andy; In love with Gao Mei	1 - 12
Ya Hui 雅慧	Gao Mei 高媚	Zhang Meiyi's best friend; Dreams to be an actress; Edgar's love interest	1 - 6, 8, 10 - 12

=== Other characters ===
Cast	Role	Description	Episode Appeared
Henry Thia 程旭辉	Fa Ge 发哥	Gao Mei, Edgar, Di Long, Meiyi, Fei Mei, Ru Hua-jie & Ru Yu-jie friend; Calefare	1 - 12
Jeremy Chan 田铭耀	Jeremy	Assistant director of 穿越百年情; Become a director in the end	1 - 12
Luisa Gan 顏尔	Juliet	A popular and arrogant actress; Edgar's Idol; Declare a search for her watch; Quarrel with Edgar	4, 7, 8, 9
Priscilla Lim 林茜茜	Fei Mei 肥妹	Gao Mei, Edgar, Di Long, Meiyi, Fa Ge, Ru Hua-jie & Ru Yu-jie friend; Calefare	1 - 12
Yoo Ah Min 尤雅敏	Ru Yu-jie 如玉姐	Gao Mei, Edgar, Di Long, Meiyi, Fei Mei, Ru Hua-jie & Fa Ge friend; Calefare	1 - 12
Grace Chong 张翠缨	Ru Hua-jie 如花姐	Gao Mei, Edgar, Di Long, Meiyi, Fei Mei, Fa Ge & Ru Yu-jie friend; Calefare	1 - 12
Shine Koh 高慧姍	Cat 小猫	Assistant of 穿越百年情; Look down of calefare	1 - 9
Nick Teo 张鈞淯	Du Yiyang 杜一阳	Director of 穿越百年情	3, 5, 6, 8
刘骏宏	刘强	Director of 穿越百年情	1 - 2, 4, 7, 9
蔡雪婷	Felicia	Actress of 穿越百年情	1 - 12
陈怡淋	Jeremy Assistant	Jeremy Helper	1 - 12

== See also ==
- List of MediaCorp Channel 8 Chinese drama series (2010s)

== Controversy ==
- A scene from episode 6 had to be removed following a public outcry of the show's casual racism. Actor Shane Pow is seen wearing an Afro wig as well as blackface make-up after a casting director fails to find a man of African descent for a role. Actor Chew Chor Meng's character had also said onscreen that Indians and Africans are "all the same." Toggle has since apologised and removed the offensive scenes from the programme.
- A scene of episode 9 has been revealed of Jeremy Chan's relationship with Jesseca Liu.

== Episodes ==
No.	Title	Original release date
1	"“死人”活演"	5 September 2016 PG
Zhong Da Tian (Chew Chor Meng) owns a calefare agency which engages extras for various drama productions. Today's shoot involves a military ambush on field. The Assistant Director (AD), Jeremy (Jeremy Chan) demands for twenty young lads to show up in three hours' time. In a scurry, Da Tian rushes to the broadcasting station to get help. Whilst doing so, he chances upon super fan Edgar (Dennis Chew), who readily agrees to play calefare at the thought of getting closer to his idol. Gao Mei's (Ya Hui) friend, Mei Yi (Hong Ling) turns up on set to meet Gao Mei. Despite her lack of confidence over the birthmark on her face, Mei Yi eventually agrees to help after Gao Mei's relentless persuasion. Ever since his mother died, Da Tian's son, Di Long (Shane Pow) spends most of his time unemployed and idling. When he asks for allowance, Da Tian seizes the opportunity to make him one of his talents. Thereon, this group of extras set foot on their acting journey, where the struggles of being a calefare await.
2	"忍!忍!忍!"	5 September 2016 PG
Edgar and Di Long turn up for their second day of shoot. Not only do they have to get themselves drenched, Di Long even faces a washroom emergency amidst filming. Gao Mei feels no better as she catches a cold in the rain. Even so, she demonstrates her professionalism and decides to go on with the shoot. The boys are impressed. As they film, Edgar and Di Long chip in to help Gao Mei 'take cover'. Like Da Tian, Hong Bao Bao (used to be “Hong Bu Nao”) (Kym Ng) first started acting as a calefare. It has been decades now, but all Bao Bao plays are comedic roles. She feels dejected for not given a chance to showcase her true talent. AD Jeremy mistakes Mei Yi's birthmark for part of her makeup, and pulls her into the background of Bao Bao's scene. For continuity purpose, Mei Yi has to be called in for later shoots. Gao Mei is ill, but chooses to work night-shift nonetheless. Edgar offers to send her to work. On their way there, Gao Mei probes for Edgar's aspiration. He begins to ponder over his life goal, and eventually decides that rather being a super fan who chases after his idols, he shall become a celebrity himself – one who has fans wooing after his trail…
3	"百变路人甲"	12 September 2016 PG
Di Long and Fa Ge (Henry Thia) sneak off to the back while in the middle of an action scene. Edgar, on the other hand, sticks close behind the main lead and attempts to steal the limelight. His exaggerated gestures calls for a chiding from the director (Nick Teo), who then switches his position with Di Long. Da Tian tries to decline an acting gig after learning that he will be partnered with Bao Bao, but to no avail. On the day of shoot, Da Tian stumbles over his lines and makes an embarrassment out of himself. Due to his NGs, the calefares are also made to do multiple retakes. Gao Mei suddenly faints out of exhaustion, leaving everyone in frantic. Edgar and Mei Yi later bring her home. Edgar fails to hide his disbelief after seeing how Gao Mei comes from a poor family. Both Mei Yi and Gao Mei find his insensitivity a turn-off. Meanwhile, Da Tian is in a distraught over his mistakes. Di Long is curious to find out what is causing his father's subpar performance. Da Tian then reveals a phobia which he has not been able to get over ever since his last act with Bao Bao. He worries for next day's shoot. Di Long empathizes with his father, and resolves to find a way to help him.
4	"趁“机”借“位”"	12 September 2016 PG
The male lead makes repeated NGs, and Ru Yu (Yoo Ah Min) is made to walk around with a pushcart. When her rheumatism acts up, Di Long offers to replace her. Ru Yu compliments Di Long for his kind offer. Bao Bao confronts Da Tian, and even suspects that he secretly likes her. In a fluster, Da Tian pretends to despise Bao Bao. She takes it for real, leaving Da Tian at lost. After paying Gao Mei a visit together, Di Long learns that Mei Yi aspires to become a singer. Mei Yi's mood dampens, and she enters the lift without Di Long. Out of the sudden, the lift breaks down and Mei Yi gets trapped in the dark. Di Long suggests that she sing as loudly as she can to help calm her nerves.
5	"鬼也怕怕"	19 September 2016 PG
Ru Yu breaks a chandelier, and Da Tian is asked to compensate the broadcasting station $3000. Unwilling to have Ru Yu take liability for the full sum, Da Tian lies that the compensation is only $600, and gives her time to pay him back by instalments. By doing so, Da Tian hopes that the talents will learn the importance of being responsible at work. During a shoot, everyone spends an enjoyable time in their Chinese zombie get-up. Gao Mei thinks that the white figures she sees are paranormal beings, when they are in fact a result of the floaters in her eyes. While paying the talents their wages, Di Long finds out that Ru Yu is told to fork out the compensation. He confronts his father, and later understands his intentions of doing so. Da Tian is contented to see how his son has grown to cherish the value of hard-earned money. When Gao Mei warns Edgar of possible paranormal encounters while filming a horror show, he chooses to turn a deaf ear to her.
6	"33度的冬天"	19 September 2016 PG
Edgar is slowly falling for Gao Mei. He looks forward to act as a couple with her, but gets hit with disappointment when Fei Mei (Priscilla Lim) turns up instead. Di Long, Mei Yi, Edgar and Fei Mei perspire profusely in their thick, winter clothing while playing as Caucasian couples. Meanwhile, Edgar fails to contain his excitement after learning that his zombie dance video is going viral. Di Long reasons that it will only make sense to remove their layers of winter clothing since there should be heater indoors, to which the director agrees. Da Tian, who watches from afar, is proud to see how much his son has grown. Bao Bao is devastated as she falls out of the Best Actress nomination list. Da Tian shows sympathy and asks Di Long to bring Bao Bao some food to aid her hangover. Bao Bao seeks solace in Di Long. Edgar, Di Long and Mei Yi go out on a movie date, and realise how they have started taking notice of calefares in the film.
7	"“妓”不择食"	26 September 2016 PG
As Da Tian ages by the day, he hopes to have Di Long succeed his business. Di Long understands his father's concerns, and decides to give it a shot. A shoot is calling for talents to act as prostitutes and hostesses. Da Tian deploys Di Long's help to search for them, but with the condition of keeping their role a secret for the time being. Edgar is asked to remove his zombie video post, but Di Long refuses to. Da Tian warns him of the undesirable consequences if they were to go against the broadcasting station' wishes. Di Long relays the message to Edgar, who insists to keep the video. When Mei Yi realises that she is cast as a prostitute, she blames Di Long for not being truthful. Despite so, she eventually decides to let things slip and accompanies Di Long out to pack lunch for the extras. Mei Yi acknowledges Di Long's kind-heartedness as he looks out for the talents. Edgar asks to take a photo with Juliet (Luisa Gan), only to get a scolding from her. Unable to take it lying down, Edgar starts to rebut. Di Long tries to break their quarrel, but to no avail. Edgar even flares up at him. Later, Edgar treats everyone to a meal where they badmouth about Di Long. When Mei Yi tries to speak up for him, everyone suspects that she has feelings for Di Long. Mei Yi denies.
8	"店主顾客一家亲"	26 September 2016 PG
In a fit of anger, Edgar leads Ru Hua (Grace Chong), Fa Ge and Fei Mei who unite forces to join a rivalry management firm, 'Tian Da Company'. Their purpose is to go against Di Long and the rest. As tensions rise during the shoot, the director reprimands them for refusing to cooperate. At the sight of Edgar, Juliet fumes with anger and demands to meet the producer. Juliet's branded watch is missing, and she assumes that the culprit must be among the calefares. Di Long steps up to speak for them. Edgar and the others are touched. Meanwhile, Tian Da appears and starts to do a search on every one without clarifying the situation. This leaves the calefares feeling humiliated. Bao Bao returns with Juliet's watch after realising that it has dropped into her bag. Rather than feeling grateful, Juliet accuses Bao Bao of stealing her watch. Bao Bao starts to point out Juliet's flaws in retort. Juliet fails to concentrate on filming after the saga, and claims that the role is too tough for any actor. Without hesitation, Bao Bao immerses into the role and awes everyone on set with her impressive act. Juliet is left embarrassed and speechless.
9	"人难当"	3 October 2016 PG
Di Long and Edgar are thrilled to act as eunuchs with given lines! Mei Yi tells Edgar that Gao Mei has been missing shoots to work overtime for her grandparents' medical bills. Edgar wishes to help Gao Mei with her finances, but frets that she won't accept it. Qiang Ge and Jeremy are holding auditions to look for a ghost singer. Di Long encourages Mei Yi to try out for it. She lies that becoming a singer is no longer her dream. Despite so, Di Long is determined to help her overcome her insecurities… But how? Something that Edgar says strikes Di Long with an idea. Mei Yi thinks that Di Long is trying to pull a mockery when he appears with a similar birthmark on his face. Little does she expect, Di Long drags her to where his friend busks, and urges her to sing. Nonchalant to people's judgemental glances, Di Long continues to hold his head high. His actions boost Mei Yi's confidence. Edgar and Fei Mei appear shortly after as Mei Yi's backup dancers. Their performance receives great responses from the crowd.
10	"聚少成多"	3 October 2016 PG
Da Tian chances upon Di Long's singing practice with Mei Yi, and probes to find out if his son's feelings for her are true. When Di Long asks Da Tian if he will object to their relationship, Da Tian assures that he won't. Fei Mei, Ru Hua and Edgar perform badly to help Mei Yi stand out during the singing auditions. Their efforts pay off as Mei Yi gets picked as the ghost singer for Juliet. While acting with Juliet, Da Tian begins to stutter as he sees Bao Bao sitting behind her. Furious, Qiang Ge decides to switch Bao Bao's position. Bao Bao falls out with Da Tian as her golden opportunity is ruined. Apologetic, Da Tian promises to overcome his problem, which he eventually does. Edgar prepares a luxurious watch as a gift for Gao Mei, confident that she will agree to date him. Meanwhile, Di Long discovers Bao Bao's news clippings in his father's secret stash. He decides to find out if Da Tian really has a secret crush on Bao Bao.
11	"戏假情真"	10 October 2016 PG
Di Long encourages Da Tian to confess to Bao Bao, but Da Tian is hesitant. Meanwhile, Edgar reels in Di Long and Mei Yi's help to trick Gao Mei to his place. Everyone is dressed as Samsui women and coolies for the shoot. Bao Bao is in jitters as she has to be hung on wires. Knowing that she has fear for heights, Da Tian gets Di Long to pass Bao Bao pills to help loosen her nerves. Whilst doing so, Di Long lets her father's secret out to Bao Bao. As she films nervously on a high platform, Da Tian musters up his courage and mimics Statue of Liberty from below. Thanks to him, Bao Bao successfully wraps up her scene. After much thought, Da Tian comes clean about his feelings for Bao Bao, and their relationship progress further. As Edgar finds help to plan his confession event, the others are surprised to learn that he has not lied about his wealth!
12	"小咖变大咖"	10 October 2016 PG
Edgar confesses to Gao Mei. Claiming that she feels humiliated, Gao Mei turns around and leaves. Mei Yi later finds out that Gao Mei is acting this way because of her low self-esteem. Di Long suggests that Edgar forgo the grand event and confess to Gao Mei in private. On his second attempt, Edgar moves Gao Mei with his sincerity. Mei Yi cooks for Da Tian and Di Long. Da Tian teases that they are ready to get married, leaving Mei Yi blushed. Mei Yi is ecstatic when she receives an offer to sing for a drama's soundtrack. Everyone except Gao Mei dresses up for a glamorous, banquet shoot. Edgar is disappointed. Two years later, Edgar invests to shoot a film. The once calefares grow to become actors who continue to work towards their own dreams and goals…

== Trivia ==
- A two part special, Star Struck (小咖大出击), features interviews with Jack Neo, Romeo Tan, Rebecca Lim, Steven Woon, Zhu Houren, Xiang Yun, Bryan Wong, Mark Lee, Chew Chor Meng and Henry Thia, was broadcast on Sunday, 10.30pm.
- The show was preempted on 29 January 2017 due to Chinese New Year Special and also on 5 & 12 March 2017 due to the telecast of current affairs programme Budget N You.
- The show was repeated on every Thursday at 12.30pm on Mediacorp Channel 8.

== Music ==
Song Title	Song Type	Lyrics	Composer	Arranger	Performer(s)	Producer(s)
路人	Theme song	Pierre Zhang 乐声	Matthew Teng 邓碧源		Ya Hui 雅慧	Mo Ju Li 麦如丽
咖喱菲	Sub-theme song	Png Keh Hock 方傢福	Matthew Teng 邓碧源		Dennis Chew 周崇庆; Shane Pow 包勋评; Ya Hui 雅慧; Hong Ling 洪凌	Mo Ju Li 麦如丽
