= House of Fortune =

Singaporean TV series

- 钱来运转
- Genre: Family; Comedy; Lunar New Year
- Written by: Tang Yeow 陈耀; Seah Choon Guan 谢俊源
- Directed by: 方傢福 Png Keh Hock 高淑怡 Gao Shu Yi
- Starring: Zhu Houren; Thomas Ong; Tong Bing Yu; Yao Wenlong; Kym Ng; Ya Hui; Bonnie Loo; Shane Pow; Xiang Yun
- Opening theme: 心窗 by 廖慧明
- Ending theme: 1) As long as you love me (爱上就好) by 廖慧明; 2) How about this (这样好吗) by Elton; 3) Back to back hug (背对背拥抱) by JJ Lin (No commentaries for News Tonight)
- Country of origin: Singapore
- Original language: Chinese
- No. of episodes: 20 (list of episodes)

Production
- Executive producer: Winnie Wong 王尤红
- Production location: Singapore
- Running time: approx. 45 minutes (exc. advertisements)

Original release
- Network: Mediacorp Channel 8
- Release: 19 January – 17 February 2016

House of Fortune (Chinese: 钱来运转) is a Singaporean drama produced and telecast on Mediacorp Channel 8. Consists of 20 episodes, it stars Zhu Houren, Thomas Ong, Tong Bing Yu, Yao Wenlong, Ya Hui, Bonnie Loo, Shane Pow, Kym Ng & Xiang Yun as the casts of this series.

== Cast ==
=== Qian Laoshi's Family ===
- Zhu Houren as Qian Laoshi 钱老实
- Thomas Ong as Qian Renjie 钱仁杰, an advertising company creative director
- Tong Bing Yu as Luo Shuping 罗舒萍, a beautician
- Bonnie Loo as Qian Ningning 钱宁宁
- Yao Wenlong as Wu Guolun 吴国伦
- Kym Ng as Qian Meiling 钱美玲
- Ya Hui as Wu Xixi 吴希希
- Aden Tan 陈昱志 as Wu Jiaming 吴佳明
- Thomas Ong as Qian Renjie 钱仁杰
- Tong Bing Yu as Luo Shuping 罗舒萍
- Xiang Yun as Chen Xiulian 陈秀莲, a volunteer
- Shane Pow as Bai Zhengyu 白正宇, a volunteer
- Sora Ma as Hu Simin 胡思敏
- Daren Tan as Bobby
- Bukoh Mary 巫许玛莉 as May
- Wendy Tseng 曾晓英 as Mary

=== Cameo appearance ===
Cast	Character	Description
Nico Chua 蔡伟彬	Helen	Came from Malaysia, Sabah; Hu Simin's friend Beautician
Ong Ai Leng	Gao Lishen 高丽莘	Qian Renjie's rival in work Henry's subordinate
Zen Chong	Henry	Qian Renjie, Gao Lishen and May's boss
Luisa Gan 颜尔	Yang Meimei 杨梅梅	Guolun's Client
Anthony Png 方钟桦	Lawrence	Villain; Cheated money from Wu Guolun; Xu Yazi's teacher
Lin Si Tong 林思彤	Xu Yazi 徐雅资	Singer

== Accolades ==
Year	Award	Category	Nominee(s)	Result	Ref
2017	Star Awards	London Choco Roll Happiness Award	Shane Pow	Nominated	
2017	Star Awards	Best Supporting Actress	Ya Hui	Nominated	

== See also ==
- List of programmes broadcast by Mediacorp Channel 8
