= Family Ties (Singaporean TV series) =

- Promotional poster
- Traditional Chinese: 家人之間
- Simplified Chinese: 家人之间
- Literal meaning: "Between Family Members"
- Hanyu Pinyin: Jiārén zhī jiān
- Genre: Drama
- Written by: Wang Xiaowei
- Directed by: Lin Meina
- Starring: Shane Pow; Jeffrey Xu; Denise Camillia Tan; Yao Wenlong; Constance Song; Lina Ng
- Opening theme: "Between Family Members" by Zheng Kaihua
- Ending theme: "Between Us" by Shane Pow and Kiki Lim
- Country of origin: Singapore
- Original language: Mandarin
- No. of seasons: 1
- No. of episodes: 20

Production
- Executive producer: Lu Yanjin
- Cinematography: Fang Xinglong
- Editors: Li Jinhua; Shen Songkun

Original release
- Network: Mediacorp Channel 8
- Release: 1 May – 26 May 2023

Family Ties (Chinese: 家人之间) is a 2023 Singaporean drama produced and telecast on Mediacorp Channel 8. It stars Shane Pow, Jeffrey Xu, Denise Camillia Tan, Yao Wenlong, Constance Song and Lina Ng. The series ran from 1 May to 26 May 2023. The series was aired at 9 pm on weekdays and had repeat telecast at 8 am the following day.

== Synopsis ==
Three children are born on the exact same day and grow up as siblings despite being unrelated by blood. Eventually, influence from their respective birth families cause them to grow into siblings with vastly different personalities. As they navigate their destiny, the three siblings attempt to reassess their family ties while reconciling with the past.

== Cast ==
- Shane Pow as Chen Boyang
- Jeffrey Xu as Chen Zhengguo
- Denise Camillia Tan as Chen Yun'en
- Yao Wenlong as Chen Zhitong
- Constance Song as Zhuo Kexiang
- Bonnie Loo as Situ Feifei
- Ya Hui as Yi Xin
- Kiki Lim as Zizi Zhang Tianai
- Tyler Ten as Lin Jianan
- Chew Chor Meng as Chen Youde
- Lina Ng as Liu Yuzhi
- Zhang Yaodong as Aoki
- Chen Tianxiang as Grandfather

== Awards and nominations ==
Accolades	Category	Nominees	Result
Star Awards 2024	Best Supporting Actress	Ya Hui	Nominated
