= Lorong Boys =

Singaporean instrumental band

- Origin: Singapore
- Genres: Classical, pop
- Years active: 2013–present
- Members: Rit Xu; David Loke; Jonathan Shin; Joachim Lim; Eugene Chew
- Past members: Gabriel Lee
- Website: www.lorongboys.com

The Lorong Boys are a Singaporean instrumental band, consisting of flautist Rit Xu, pianist-guitarist Jonathan Shin, violinist David Loke, percussionist Joachim Lim, and bassist Eugene Chew. They rose to fame after performing inside MRT trains in 2014.

== History ==
All of its members came from the Yong Siew Toh Conservatory of Music, and first met one another in 2013 when they took the same jazz performance module at the National University of Singapore, while pursuing Bachelor of Music degrees. They started practising together in preparation for a school talent contest, Sparkz, in February 2014, eventually coming in first place. In May 2014, after putting up an impromptu performance to commuters in MRT trains, one of their videos went viral, gaining 1,488 shares and 3,042 likes on Facebook.

Since then, the Lorong Boys have been invited to perform in various concerts and festivals, including the NUS Arts Festival 2015, the SG50 Concert Series in the Park, events at Esplanade – Theatres on the Bay, Singapore Arts Festival, the President's Star Charity 2015 and the Singapore Writers Festival. They have also made special television appearances and were featured in SG50: The Gift of Song's winning entry "These are the Days". In 2015, they recorded the opening theme for MediaCorp Channel 8 long-form drama Life - Fear Not with Liang Wern Fook.

At the same time, the Lorong Boys provide workshops for students to introduce them to music education.

== Musical style ==
The Lorong Boys play a wide range of musical styles, ranging from classical music to songs from Broadway musicals to chart-topping popular songs.

== Awards ==
Year	Award	Nominated work	Result
2017	Best Theme Song	Life - Fear Not	Nominated
