= Kayly Loh =

Singaporean actress (born 1988)

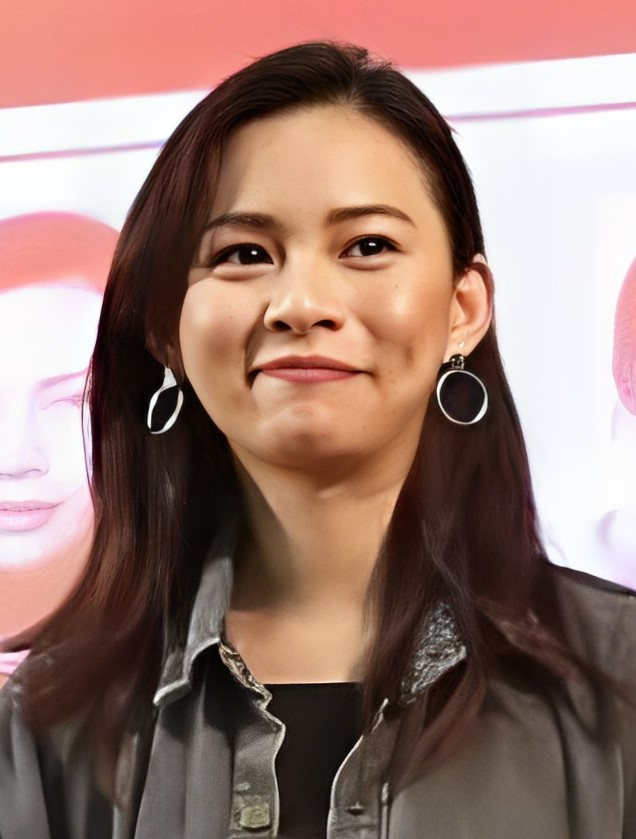
- Loh in October 2017
- Born: 16 May 1988 (age 38); Singapore
- Other names: Kayly; Kai Li; Lu Chuanjin
- Education: Nanyang Polytechnic
- Occupations: Actress; comedian; entrepreneur; host
- Years active: 2015–present
- Spouse: Jonathan Chong (m. 2021)

Stage name
- Traditional Chinese: 凱麗
- Simplified Chinese: 凯丽
- Hanyu Pinyin: Kǎilì

Birth name
- Traditional Chinese: 盧傳瑾
- Simplified Chinese: 卢传瑾
- Hanyu Pinyin: Lú Chuánjǐn

Kayly Loh Chuan Yee (born 16 May 1988) is a Singaporean actress, comedian and entrepreneur.

== Early life and career ==
Loh is the youngest of three children. Her sister is five years older and works as a marketing manager in the finance industry and she has a brother who is three years older. Loh's parents run a printing company.

Loh graduated from Nanyang Polytechnic in 2007, with a Diploma in Marketing.

Loh entered showbiz after winning the MediaCorp Channel 5 talent contest, The 5 Search, in 2015. Prior to joining the contest, Loh had been running her own display advertising company which was launched in 2010.

== Ventures ==
Loh started a floral company Bucket Full of Roses (BFOR) in 2016, with its studio located in a Ubi Road industrial building.

== Personal life ==
In May 2021, Loh announced that she will be using the Chinese stage name 凯丽 (Kǎilì).

Loh described herself as not religious.

In December 2021, Loh married commercial director Jonathan Chong, who is two years older. Loh revealed that she had known Chong through purchasing an in-car head unit from him on Carousell. About 120 guests attended their wedding dinner banquet at Raffles Hotel, including actors Tay Ping Hui, Pierre Png, Rebecca Lim, Denise Camillia Tan, Priscelia Chan, Cavin Soh, Hong Huifang and Tay Ying.

== Filmography ==
Loh has appeared in the following programmes:

=== Television series ===
- Tanglin (2015−2018)
- The Dream Job (2016)
- You Can Be an Angel 2 (2016)
- Dream Coder (2017)
- Babies On Board (2018)
- 118 Reunion (2018)
- Jalan Jalan (2018)
- C.L.I.F. 5 (2019)
- A Quest to Heal (2020)
- Super Dad (2020)
- Recipe of Life (2020)
- My Star Bride (2021)
- The Peculiar Pawnbroker (2021)
- Sisters Stand Tall (2022)
- Fix My Life (2023)

=== Web series ===
- Dream Walkers (2018)
- We the Citizens (2018)
- Wake Up! (2018)
- Limited Edition (2019)

=== Variety and reality show ===
- The Noose (2016)

== Theatre ==
- Noose & Kakis 2: My PSLE is Better than Yours (2017)

== Awards and nominations ==
Year	Organisation	Category	Nominated work	Result	Ref.
2019	Star Awards	Best Newcomer	Dream Walker	Nominated	
2022	Asian Academy Creative Awards	Best Actress in a Supporting Role (Singapore)	Sister Stand Tall	Won	
2025	Star Awards	Top 10 Most Popular Female Artistes	—N/a	Nominated	
