= The Hiddens =

Hong Kong television series

- Original title: 隱世者們
- Genre: Thriller; Action
- Created by: Gary Tang
- Starring: Lawrence Ng; Jessica Hester Hsuan; Michael Tao; William So
- Country of origin: Hong Kong
- Original languages: Cantonese; Japanese
- No. of seasons: 1
- No. of episodes: 20

Production
- Producer: Gary Tang Johnny Yau Gao Lung
- Production company: Gary Tang's Workshop

Original release
- Network: Astro Wah Lai Toi; MyTV SUPER
- Release: September 22 – October 19, 2016

The Hiddens (Chinese: 隱世者們) is a Hong Kong thriller television series created and produced by Gary Tang. The series debuted on Astro Wah Lai Toi in Malaysia and on MyTV SUPER in Hong Kong on September 22, 2016.

Many of the cast members previously acted in the File of Justice franchise, which was also produced by Gary Tang.

== Premise ==
A convicted prisoner has his death faked for him and is recruited to perform dangerous missions throughout Asia by a mysterious organization.

== Cast ==
=== Main ===
- Lawrence Ng as Gong Ning

A convicted prisoner who is presumed dead after the van transporting him to prison is hijacked en route. In reality, he had been scouted and recruited into a covert operation group. He accepts the recruitment on the condition that he will be able to see his wife and son again. He is the strategist and unofficial leader of the group, but is also skilled in physical combat.

- Jessica Hester Hsuan as Wai Ming

A mysterious and ruthless woman working for a clandestine organization, she forcefully recruited Gong Ning and his team members to carry out covert operations on behalf of her organization.

- William So as Yau Jung-tai

A master of disguise who is part of Gong Ning's covert operation team.

- Michael Tao as Cheong Soon-on

A Hong Kong Police Force officer who is after the covert operations group.

- Duncan Chow as Chen Chi-keung

A weapons expert and assassin who joins the covert operations group.

=== Supporting ===
Felix Lok portrays Ma Kai-ming, Cheong Soon-on's superior. The parts filmed in Malaysia also features local talents from Astro, including Miss Astro Chinese Denise Camillia Tan, Vivienne Onn, Shian Ter, Kevin Soo, Nicholas King, Chung Lai Chan and Thang Hoo Ley.
