= Life - Fear Not =

- Also known as: Life's Blessings
- 人生无所畏
- Genre: Socio-drama; Dramedy; Hotel; Restaurant; Education; Christmas; Chinese New Year; Musical
- Written by: Lau Ching Poon; Goh Chwee Chwee; Chen Siew Khoon
- Directed by: Loo Yin Kam; Su Miao Fang; Fu Zibing; Qiu Jian Ting; Guo Hong Ren
- Starring: Chen Shucheng; Rayson Tan; Felicia Chin; Aloysius Pang; Chen Liping
- Voices of: Xiang Yun 向云
- Opening theme: 人生无所畏 by Liang Wern Fook and Lorong Boys
- Ending theme: 1) 爱❤无所畏 by Bonnie Loo; 2) 落脚处 by Felicia Chin; 3) 一样 by Aloysius Pang & Carrie Wong
- Country of origin: Singapore
- Original languages: Mandarin, with some English dialogue
- No. of episodes: 120

Production
- Executive producer: Jasmine Woo 邬毓琳

Original release
- Network: Mediacorp Channel 8 (2015-2016)
- Release: October 19, 2015 – April 1, 2016

Related
- Don't Stop Believin'

Life - Fear Not (Chinese: 人生无所畏, previously titled Life's Blessings) ran for 120 episode series produced by Mediacorp Channel 8. It stars Chen Shucheng, Rayson Tan, Felicia Chin, Aloysius Pang and Chen Liping as the casts of this series.

The show replaced the second half of the 7.00 pm drama timeslot, airing weekdays from October 19, 2015, 7.30 pm to 8.00 pm on weekdays making it the 2nd long form half an hour drama airing together with news-current affairs programme Hello Singapore at 6.30pm.

== Plot ==
The story revolves around the Zhuang family who runs and resides in a small inn, traditional hotel and shophouse known as “Our Humble Lodge”. Zhuang Shuiqing (Chen Shucheng) is the head of the family; he is kind-hearted and is always willing to go all out to help others. His eldest son, Zhuang Daoqiang (Rayson Tan) is the vice principal and later principal of Zhi Li Secondary School. He is a refined man who is deeply in love with the inn and traditional hotel manager, Lin Jiajia (Chen Liping). His third daughter, Zhuang Daohan (Felicia Chin), has many past relationships and has a very candid personality. His youngest son, Zhuang Daoren (Aloysius Pang), is quirky in nature. He dreams of making it big and always thinks of ways to make a quick fortune. He meets self-proclaimed impersonating policewoman, Bai Meigui (Carrie Wong), and eventually falls in love with her. Though the Zhuangs lives together harmoniously, but there are times when the siblings turn against each other. Shuiqing suffers from memory lapses and could no longer carry out his duties. Daoren suggests selling off “Our Humble Lodge” and divides the profits. His suggestion faces violent objection from the rest of the family members and their relationship soured. After much trial and tribulations, the Zhuangs finally understands the importance of family unity. They put aside all their grudges and reconcile with each other. The series features various short stories with different themes about life. As the story progresses, each character will learn some valuable life lesson, but most importantly one should learn to lead a fulfilling and fearless life.

== Cast ==
=== Zhuang Shuiqing's Family, Friends, Relatives and Our Humble Lodge Staffs ===
Cast	Role	Description
Chen Shucheng	Zhuang Shuiqing 庄水清	Owns and Runs "Our Humble Lodge"
Rayson Tan	Zhuang Daoqiang 庄道强	撞到墙; Vice Principal and later Principal of Zhi Li Secondary School, replacing Cui Dabao's (Ben Yeo)'s position.
Felicia Chin	Zhuang Daohan 庄道涵	Works as a Radio DJ at Mediacorp Radio Station YES 933.
Aloysius Pang	Zhuang Daoren 庄道仁	
Chen Liping	Lin Jiajia 林佳佳	
Zhang Yaodong	Liu Yishou 刘一守	
Lin Meijiao	Huang Jinhua 黄金花	
Zheng Geping	Shenlong 神龙	
Brandon Wong	Lin Dashou 林大寿	
Sora Ma	Zhang Xiuyan 张秀燕	
Bonnie Loo	Peng Chu'er 彭楚儿	
Nick Teo	Wang Hongzhi 汪鸿志	
Chen Huihui	Xiuyan 秀燕	
Xavier Ong	Liu Yicong 刘一聪	
Aileen Tan	Zhuang Daomei 庄道美	
Zhu Houren	Xiao Daren 萧大任	
Justin Lim Ye Teng 林業騰	Joey	
Michelle Tay 郑荔分	Fu-Sao 福嫂	
Huang Shinan 黃世南	Peng Tiansheng 彭天胜	

=== Zhi Li Secondary School ===
Cast	Role	Description
Ben Yeo	Cui Dabao 崔大保	Former Brilliante Secondary School Teacher and Former Zhi Li Secondary School Principal; Also reprises his role from Don't Stop Believin'.
Elvin Ng	Wu Yanbin 吴彦彬	Former Brilliante Secondary School and Former Zhi Li Secondary School Counsellor; Also reprises his role from Don't Stop Believin'.
Koh Jia Ler 许家乐	Wang Huaipo 王怀坡	Troublemaker (破坏王); Student; Zhuang Daoqiang and Lu Guoli's best friend
Jason Lee 李国扬	Wu Jinji 吴锦基	Student; Wang Huaipo, Xiaotian & Lu Guoli's Friend Was caught shoplifted at Zhixiang's shop in episode 22
Isaac Wu 吳冠毅	Dongxuan 东轩	Student; Wang Huaipo & Lu Guoli's Friend Expelled out of school after accused of making a false claim that Daoqiang molested him and Guoli; Died in a car accident in Episode 20 (Deceased - Episode 20)
Nicole Fu 符嘉轩	Xiaotian 小甜	Student; Wang Huaipo and Lu Guoli's Friend
Nicole Fu 符嘉轩	Xiaomi 小蜜	Xiaotian's twin Opted-out of school as she is weak academically and took care of the family, but switched places with Xiaotian from time to time so that she can get an education too
吴乐轩	Xiaoqi 小棋	Huang Jinhua's Daughter; Posted to Zhi Li Secondary School in episode 69
纪丽晶	Mrs Huang 黄老师	Zhi Li Secondary School Teacher; Quarreled with Lu Guoli and got him expelled but persuade Zhuang Daoqiang not to expel Guoli out of Zhi Li Secondary School

=== YES 933 ===
Cast	Role	Description
Eelyn Kok 郭惠雯	Jane Seah	Zhuang Daohan's Supervisor at Mediacorp YES 933 Radio Station
Yusuke Fukuchi 福地祐介	Shen Jinbin 沈金斌	Crazy Man (神经病); Zhuang Daohan's colleague, co-host of "Daohan's Journal"; Zhuang Daoren's buddy Try dating with Zhuang Daohan but broke up cause not compatible
Melody Low	Amy	Zhuang Daohan's friend Zhuang Daohan repeatedly set up a date between Liu Yishou and her Loves Liu Yishou; Liu Yishou told her the person he likes is Zhuang Daohan; Frustrated when Liu Yishou says the person he loves is Zhuang Daohan; Breaks friendship with Zhuang Daohan as Liu Yishou told her he likes Zhuang Daohan, but reconciled in Episode 85

=== Bai Meigui's Family ===
Cast	Role	Description
Carrie Wong 黄思恬	Bai Meigui 白梅桂	Police impersonator Bai Jinshan's daughter Raymond's younger sister Zhuang Daoren's ex- girlfriend and business partner engaged to Henry; Agreed to go back to Daoren in persuading him to go for the operation Zhuang Daoren's Girlfriend
林傾如	Ray's & Bai Meigui's Mother	Mother of Ray and Bai Meigui; Blame Daohan for Ray's death Suffering from acute Liver disease Henry's Liver is a suitable donor (Deceased - Condition Worsen)
Terence Tay 郑仲伟	Raymond	Bai Meigui's elder brother Zhuang Daohan's ex-boyfriend Fell to his death after committing suicide at the mall in Episode 12 (Deceased - Episode 12)

=== Lu Guoli's Family ===
Cast	Role	Description
Amos Lim 林轩存	Lu Guoli 陆国力	Student; Wang Huaipo's Best Friend; Shenlong's adoptive son Mei'e's son
Hong Huifang	Liang Mei'e 梁美娥	Lu Guoli's mother Had a miscarriage 7 years ago caused by Shenlong
Zheng Geping	Shenlong 神龙	Fortune teller Regular customer of My Humble Lodge restaurant One of the Fu Lu Shou of the inn Lu Guoli's adoptive Father; Went overseas to work according to Guoli in Episode 84

=== Cameo appearances ===
Cast	Role	Description
陳天祥	Uncle Wang 王伯	Paralyzed Old Man; Wang Ziye's Father
Yap Huixin 叶慧馨	Emily 愛美丽	Teenage Cheat; Project Superstar Contestant; Suffers from motor neurone disease
Joyce Ng 黄琬婷	Lynn	Peng Chu'er's classmate Indirectly caused the death of Raymond
Bryan Chan 陈国华	Bai Jinshan 白金山	Bai Meigui's bogus father Paid by Bai Meigui's mother to impersonate her father
Ian Fang 方伟杰	Bai Zhixiang 白志翔	Former student of Brilliante Secondary School; Du Siman's Student; Currently works in a minimart Observed Wu Jinji's pickpocketing antics for a long time
Douglas Kung 孔祥德	Mentally Challenged Man 傻子	Mentally Challenged Man
Luisa Gan	夏天	Con - Artist; Cheated Men of their money as she stole a handphone
Zhang Wei 张为	Sun Wugong 孙武功	Monkey King (孙悟空); Senile dementia uncle His son left him in the inn as he is annoying but came back for him
Seth Ang 翁兴昂	Wang Ziye 王子业	Villain but later decided to repent Uncle Wang's son Caused Jiajia to Miscarriage; Seek Revenge on Daohan as she stop Yishou from giving him money Caught by Yishou and sent him to the police station (Arrested - Episode 77)
Charles Lee 李家庆	Henry	Bai Megui's new boyfriend Bai Meigui's engagement guy Going to get married Warned Daoren to stay away from Bai Meigui; Was almost stabbed by Daoren
Jeffrey Xu	Try Toh	Villain; Zhuang Daohan's Former Girlfriend who betrayed her by dealing with drug trafficking Arrested - Episode 71
Leron Heng	箫小姐	Houseowner; Lu Guoli and Wang Huaipo do volunteer work Got in a dispute with Wang Huaipo after she gave him $2 for the housework done Went to complain to Zhuang Daoqiang about Wang Huaipi and Lu Guoli to Expel them Zhuang Daoren's Ex-Classmate
Felicia Chin	Du Siman 杜思曼	Brilliante Secondary School Chinese Teacher; Missing after the events of Don't Stop Believin' but mentioned in this series Resembles Zhuang Daohan

== Original Sound Track (OST) ==
Song title	Performer
人生无所畏 (Opening Theme Song)	Liang Wern Fook featuring Lorong Boys
爱❤无所畏	Bonnie Loo
落脚处	Felicia Chin
一样	Aloysius Pang and Carrie Wong
你的背包	Yap Huixin

== Accolades ==
Year	Award	Category	Nominee(s)	Result	Ref
2017	Star Awards	Best Theme Song	"人生无所畏"	Nominated	
2017	Star Awards	Best Evergreen Artiste Award	Rayson Tan	Nominated	
