= Teresa Tseng =

Taiwanese singer and actress

Teresa Tseng is a Taiwanese singer and actress. She is known for coming in second place in the Singaporean television music competition Campus SuperStar, as well as starring in several Singaporean television series, such as Let It Shine and Table of Glory.

== Career ==
While Tseng was attending CHIJ Katong Convent, she participated in the Singaporean television music competition Campus SuperStar, where she came in second place. Following this, she starred in the drama television series Let It Shine in 2007. She then starred in the sports and romance drama television series Table of Glory in 2009.

She returned to Taiwan after graduating from Ngee Ann Polytechnic in 2013 to pursue a singing career. She participated in the Chinese reality singing competition Chinese Idol and the Taiwanese reality singing competition Chinese Million Star later that year. She released her first EP, Want To Meet Someone, in 2016. She returned to Singapore in 2017 to star in the television drama Mind Matters.

In 2021, Tseng released a new single, "Nightingale", inspired by healthcare workers during the COVID-19 pandemic.

== Filmography ==
Year	Title	Role	Notes	Ref
2007	Let It Shine			
2009	Table of Glory	Mai Xiao Fen 麦晓芬		
2011	Let's Play Love	Xiaoyi 晓奕		
2017	Mind Matters	Lu Haining 卢海宁		
