= Ya Hui =

Singaporean actress and host (born 1987)

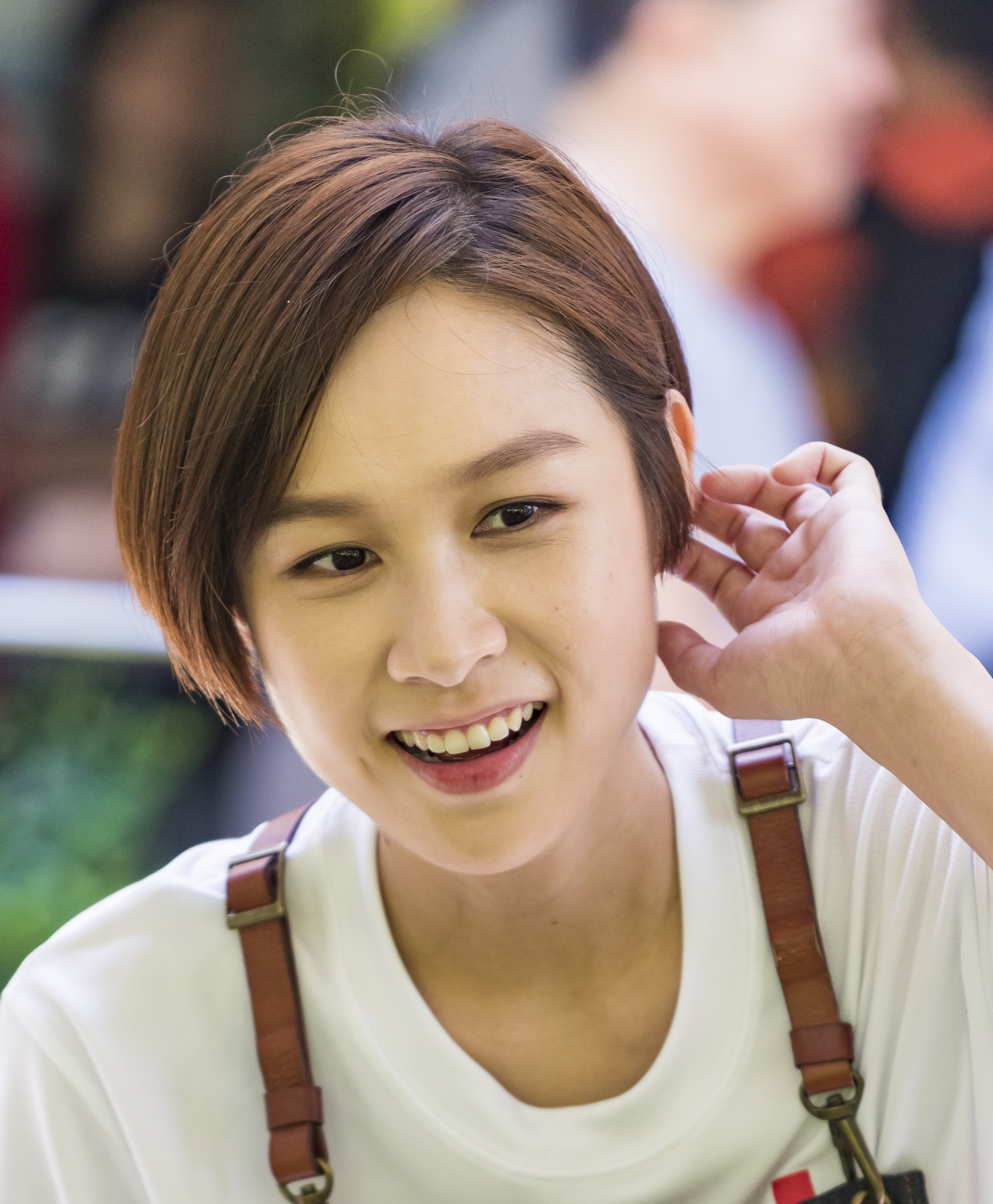
- Ya Hui at a 2018 charity event organized by the Singapore Red Cross
- Born: Koh Yah Hwee; 18 May 1987 (age 39)
- Education: Manjusri Secondary School
- Alma mater: Serangoon Junior College
- Occupations: Actress; host
- Years active: 2007-present
- Awards: Full list

Stage name
- Traditional Chinese: 雅慧
- Simplified Chinese: 雅慧
- Hanyu Pinyin: Yǎhuì

Birth-name
- Traditional Chinese: 許雅慧
- Simplified Chinese: 许雅慧
- Hanyu Pinyin: Xǔ Yǎhuì

Ya Hui (born Koh Yah Hwee on 18 May 1987) is a Singaporean actress and host.

== Early life ==
Ya Hui was born Koh Yah Hwee on 18 May 1987. She is a Singaporean. She was educated at Manjusri Secondary School and Serangoon Junior College. She joined the Dance Team for her Co-Curricular Activities from her primary school days to junior college, and was the prom queen during her college days.

== Career ==
Ya Hui was offered a contract with Mediacorp after the Star Search contest, a large-scale TV talent scouting competition in Singapore, in 2007. She was considered a popular contestant for that contest season. She was one of the runners-up and the winner of the Miss Telegenic title at the grand finals. Shortly after, Ya Hui was chosen as the face for the TVC of beverages brand Heaven and Earth. She also landed a supporting role in the long-running drama series, Love Blossoms II as Tao Wen Zhu, acting alongside seasoned actors Ivy Lee and Zheng Geping.

In 2009, Ya Hui starred in Reunion Dinner, in which she played Chen Liping's daughter. Her outstanding performance in the drama serials earned her nominations for the Newcomer Award of the Year in The New Paper Flame Awards 2008 and the Best Newcomer Award for Star Awards 2009. In September 2015, she completed filming the long-running 255-episode television drama series, 118, which aired weekdays on Mediacorp Channel 8. She was also appointed as the Singapore ambassador of the L'Oréal Paris Youth Code product in 2015.

In late February 2023, Ya Hui announced that she will be leaving Mediacorp as a full-time artiste on 28 February 2023.

== Personal life ==
Ya Hui's official fan club is named "Team Yahui".

On 24 September 2015, Ya Hui was taken to the hospital after experiencing vomiting, possibly due to food poisoning.

She speaks Teochew and basic Cantonese.

== Filmography ==
=== Television series ===
Year	Title	Role	Notes	Ref.
2008	Love Blossoms	Tao Wenzhu		
2008	Love Blossoms II	Tao Wenzhu		
2009	Reunion Dinner	Liang Meiqi		
2009	Table of Glory	Liu Yu		
2009	My Buddy	Zeng Zhimei		
2009	Happy Family	Yao Simin		
2010	The Best Things in Life	Chen Jiahui		
2010	Breakout	Xu Chunli		
2011	A Tale of 2 Cities	Guan Yiting		
2011	Bountiful Blessings	Tong Tianqing		
2012	Double Bonus	Tian Mi		
2012	The Enchanted	Liang Lulu		
2012	Point of Entry 3	Melissa Chew		
2013	Marry Me (我要嫁出去)	Liang Ruoxian		
2013	Gonna Make It	Zhang Wenya		
2013	Mata Mata	Betty		
2014	Served H.O.T (烧。卖)	Zeng Meiwei		
2014	Love Travels (爱旅游)	Tong Tianqing		
2015	Life Is Beautiful	Cai Jiajia		
2014-2015	118	Hong Jinzhi		
2016	House of Fortune	Wu Xixi		
2016	I Want to Be a Star	Gao Mei		
2016	C.L.I.F. 4	Wang Shishi		
2016	Hero	Betty		
2016-2017	118 II	Hong Jinzhi		
2018	118 Reunion (118 大团圆)	Hong Jinzhi		
2018	Die Die Also Must Serve (战备好兄弟)	Carrely Tan		
2018	Babies on Board (新生)	Li Xinyue		
2018	Blue Tick (已读不回)	Zhang Xuanci		
2018	Magic Chef (料理人生)	Fang Ting		
2019	How Are You?	He Baibai		
2019	While You Were Away (一切从昏睡开始)	Zhang Manrong		
2019	Day Break (天空渐渐亮)	Xie Wanan		
2020	A Quest to Heal	Ya San		
2020	A Quest to Heal	Yan Tingting		
2020	How Are You? 2 (好世谋2)	He Baibai		
2021	CTRL	Liang Siyun		
2022	Home Again (多年后的全家福)	Ye Ping'an		
2022	Truths About Us (别来无恙)	Li Silin		
2023	Family Ties	Yi Xin		
2023	My One and Only	Shen Baoyou		

=== Film ===
Year	Title	Role	Notes	Ref.
2013	Everybody's Business	Bai Zhenzhen	Special appearance	
2015	1400	Summer		
2023	Seven Days	Ailing		

=== Show hosting ===
Year	Title	Notes	Ref.
2012	Mat Yo Yo		
2012	Lohas (乐活好正点)		
2013	Mat Yo Yo		
2014	Style: Check-In (潮人攻略)	Season 4	

== Discography ==
=== Compilation albums ===
Year	English title	Mandarin title
2013	MediaCorp Music Lunar New Year Album 13	群星贺岁金蛇献祥和
2017	MediaCorp Music Lunar New Year Album 17	新传媒群星咕鸡咕鸡庆丰年
2018	MediaCorp Music Lunar New Year Album 18	新传媒群星阿狗狗过好年
2019	MediaCorp Music Lunar New Year Album 19	新传媒群星猪饱饱欢乐迎肥年
2020	MediaCorp Music Lunar New Year Album 20	裕鼠鼠纳福迎春了
2021	MediaCorp Music Lunar New Year Album 21	福满牛年Moo Moo乐

== Awards and nominations ==
Year	Ceremony	Category	Nominated work	Result	Ref.
2008	The New Paper Flame Awards 2008	Newcomer Award of the Year	—N/a	Nominated	
2009	Star Awards	Best Newcomer	Love Blossoms (as Tao Wenzhu)	Nominated	
2014	Star Awards	Top 10 Most Popular Female Artistes	—N/a	Won	
2015	Star Awards	Top 10 Most Popular Female Artistes	—N/a	Nominated	
2016	Star Awards	Top 10 Most Popular Female Artistes	—N/a	Nominated	
2016	Star Awards	Bioskin Flawless Skin Award	—N/a	Won	
2016	Star Awards	Best Actress	118 (as Hong Jinzhi)	Nominated	
2017	Star Awards	Top 10 Most Popular Female Artistes	—N/a	Won	
2017	Star Awards	Best Supporting Actress	House of Fortune (as Wu Xixi)	Nominated	
2018	Star Awards	Top 10 Most Popular Female Artistes	—N/a	Won	
2019	Star Awards	Top 10 Most Popular Female Artistes	—N/a	Won	
2021	Star Awards	Top 10 Most Popular Female Artistes	—N/a	Won	
2022	Star Awards	Best Actress	CTRL (as Liang Siyun)	Nominated	
2022	Star Awards	Top 10 Most Popular Female Artistes	—N/a	Won	
2023	Star Awards	Top 10 Most Popular Female Artistes	—N/a	Won	
2024	Star Awards	Best Supporting Actress	Family Ties (as Yi Xin)	Nominated	
2024	Star Awards	Top 10 Most Popular Female Artistes	—N/a	Won	
2025	Star Awards	Best Supporting Actress	Coded love	Nominated	
2025	Star Awards	Top 10 Most Popular Female Artistes	—N/a	Won	
