= Let's Play Love =

- PK爱情
- Genre: Romance; Dramedy
- Directed by: 叶佩娟
- Starring: Huang Jing Lun; Teresa Tseng; James Seah; Sora Ma; Jeffrey Xu; Julie Tan; Romeo Tan; Silver Ang
- Opening theme: 我们的Show by Huang Jing Lun
- Ending theme: 缘来有你 by Le Sheng 乐声
- Original language: Chinese
- No. of episodes: 20

Production
- Producer: Lai Lee Thin 赖丽婷
- Running time: approx. 3 mins per webisode

Original release
- Network: MediaCorp TV Channel U
- Release: 4 April – 20 May 2011

Let's Play Love (PK爱情) is a Singaporean web series which was launched in April 2011. It was produced to celebrate xinmsn's 1st anniversary and is the first interactive web series produced by MediaCorp. Webisodes are available on xinmsn's Catch-up TV portal. It was also broadcast on Channel U.

The series is about the participants of a dating game show. Every five webisodes, netizens could vote on their favourite outcome and the next five webisodes are produced based on audience feedback. The webisodes are released only a week later to give the cast and crew time to film based on the online polls. The cast mainly consists of younger artistes such as Taiwan-based Singaporean singer Huang Jing Lun, Campus SuperStar 2006 runner-up Teresa Tseng and Star Search 2010 finalists Romeo Tan and Sora Ma as well as established MediaCorp artistes Bryan Wong and Michelle Chia.

== Synopsis ==
A TV station organises a whole new reality show Let's Play Love, with the aim of selecting an individual who emerges the master of the game. Four males and four females from different backgrounds will come together to participate in the game. Through a series of missions, each individual will be challenged on their views towards love. Who will emerge as the winner to attain the title of Best Lover?

== Cast ==
=== Contestants ===
- Huang Jing Lun as Ian 李秀衍 - A 24-year-old geeky computer engineer, he joined as a replacement for his friend who had backed out at the last minute. He is socially awkward and looks like an average Joe. Through a misunderstanding, he ends up falling for Xiaoyi.
- Teresa Tseng as Xiaoyi 晓奕 - The 22-year-old university graduate comes from a wealthy family and does not need to find a job. Trendy and sophisticated, she is quite self-conscious about her public image and reputation and displays a confidence Ian lacks.
- James Seah as Chengxi 承羲 - The 26-year-old is an advertisement designer. Confident and good-looking, he has been pursued by girls for most of life and yearns to find his own love rather than be matchmade with a girl.
- Jeffrey Xu as Nicholas - Clean-cut and suave, the 27-year-old stock broker is very self-conscious about his image and will do anything to get what he wants.
- Julie Tan as Isabelle - The 25-year-old insurance agent appears trendy and sophisticated but has a sensitive side.
- Sora Ma as Priscilia - After finishing secondary school, she became an air stewardess. Her slender frame and attractive looks often draw many admirers.
- Romeo Tan as Ash - Good-looking and well-built, the 22-year-old secondary school drop-out is a model and hopes to venture into the Chinese language entertainment industry despite his poor command of the language
- Silver Ang as Kimmy - Tomboyish and plain-looking, she claims to be 25 years old but is actually 33.

=== Production Crew ===
- Michelle Chia as Coco - Executive producer. The 37-year-old university graduate rules the crew with an iron hand. Anything contradictory to her opinions are met with a barrage of verbal abuse but she is willing to go the extra mile to please her superiors.
- Bryan Wong as Ou Yusen 欧宇森 - Show host. At 34, gone are his glory days but he refuses to admit it. His boisterous attitude often puts him in conflict with the headstrong Coco. He only starts taking the show seriously once he realised that he has regained his "market value" through the show.
- Mika Chung as Candice - The poly graduate is Coco's assistant producer. Unfortunately, she is simple-minded and is thus often used as a buffer by Coco and Yusen during their arguments.

=== Cameo appearance ===
- Xiaxue - Xiaoyi's friend.

== Reception ==
The series received a positive reception from many netizens for its innovative format. It was the first of its kind ever produced in MediaCorp history. Its success led to the production of Blk 88, Singapore's first animated web series and i.Rock which stars Derrick Hoh, Keely Wee, Cavin Soh, Chen Yixi and Darren Lim.
