= Soul Detective =

- 灵探
- Genre: Drama
- Starring: James Seah; Bryan Wong; Jesseca Liu; Carrie Wong; Cavin Soh; Nick Teo; Guo Liang; Priscelia Chan; Jeremy Chan
- Country of origin: Singapore
- Original language: Mandarin
- No. of episodes: 20

Production
- Executive producer: Zheng Geping

Original release
- Network: Mediacorp Channel 8
- Release: November 21 – December 16, 2022

Related
- Leave No Soul Behind (2021); Soul Doctor (2022)

Soul Detective (Chinese: 灵探) is a Singaporean supernatural drama series produced and telecast on Mediacorp Channel 8. It stars James Seah, Bryan Wong, Jesseca Liu, Carrie Wong, Cavin Soh, Nick Teo, Guo Liang, Priscelia Chan and Jeremy Chan.

== Cast ==
=== Main ===
- James Seah as Peh Ye
- Bryan Wong as Ang Zhe Ren
- Jesseca Liu as Liu Shu Qin
- Carrie Wong as Ang Jieshan
- Cavin Soh as Wu Meizhen
- Nick Teo as Brad Kong
- Guo Liang as Peh Ching Keong
- Priscelia Chan as Sergeant C
- Jeremy Chan as Feng Kang Kai

=== Recurring ===
- Phyllis Quek as Yu Jiachun
- Cheryl Chou as Chloe Lam

== Production ==
Zheng Geping is the executive producer of the show.
