= Disclosed =

Television program

- 揭秘
- Genre: Cybercrime; Thriller
- Written by: Ho Hee Ann 何启安
- Starring: Tender Huang; Jesseca Liu; Andie Chen; Shane Pow; Tang Lingyi
- Opening theme: 全裸 by Canace Wu
- Ending theme: 禁止回转 by Canace Wu 违建 by Canace Wu 疗伤歌手 by Anthony Neely 小丑 by Kelly Poon
- Country of origin: Singapore
- Original language: Chinese
- No. of episodes: 20 (List of episodes)

Production
- Producer: Molby Low 刘健财
- Running time: approx. 45 minutes
- Production company: Wawa Pictures

Original release
- Network: MediaCorp Channel 8
- Release: 28 October – 22 November 2013

Related
- Gonna Make It; The Journey: A Voyage

Disclosed (揭秘) is a Singaporean Chinese investigative thriller drama which started on 28 October 2013, focusing on cybercrime cases which involve Internet fraud, celebrity privacy, online money laundering and such. It stars Tender Huang, Jesseca Liu, Andie Chen, Shane Pow & Tang Lingyi as casts of this series. The show aired at 9 pm on weekdays. The series revolves around an elite team of PR specialists who specialize in cybercrimes.

The series is the 10th top-rated drama serial at 9 pm for 2013, with an average viewership of 772,000. It is also the lowest-rated drama serial among three dramas which were produced by Wawa Pictures and aired by Channel 8 (The Oath had 915,000, and was the 3rd top-rated series at 9 pm for 2011; Game Plan was within the top six, with 851,000). Possibly due to this, it was the first Wawa production not to have a single nomination for Star Awards 20.

== Plot ==
‘Disclosed’ revolves around a group of Public Relations (PR) specialists who helps high society clients perform damage control and maintain a favourable image. The team is led by computer forensic, Wen Chang Yu (Tender Huang), who is highly intelligent and will resort to all means to crack a case. He looks like an optimist but he is actually bothered by a secret until he meets righteous Kuang Yun Xiang (Jesseca Liu). Bound by a superior-subordinate relationship, because of their differences in opinions, Chang Yu and Yun Xiang often bicker with each other. Gradually, they fell in love, being by loggerheads by day at work and lovers by night. ‘Disclosed’ is a concept derived from true accounts of social media cases involving Internet fraud and cybercrimes, where a secret is never a secret as long as social media exist. Each case covers 2 to 3 thrilling episodes.

== Cast ==
=== Main cast ===
Cast	Role	Description	Episodes Appeared
Tender Huang 黄腾浩	Wen Changyu 温昌渝	Nicknamed 'Pomfret'. An intelligent Public Relations (PR) computer forensic. Computer Professor.	1-20
Jesseca Liu 刘子绚	Kuang Yunxiang 邝芸香	Lawyer working for Chang Yu and Chang Yu's wife.	1-20
Andie Chen 陈邦鋆	Zhang Letian 张乐天	Main Villain; Senior Inspector, former mysterious hacker 'Slyfox'; Yun Xiang’s first love and University senior. Mole of the Singapore Police Force. Jailed, but later fled to seek revenge in Episode 20. Later died in Episode 20.	7-20
Shane Pow 包勋评	Kuang Siyuan 邝思远	Yun Xiang’s younger brother Aspires to be an entrepreneur.	
Tang Lingyi 汤灵伊	Kuang Yunjun 邝芸君	Magazine reporter Yun Xiang’s younger sister.	

=== Supporting cast ===
Cast	Role	Description	Episodes Appeared
Richard Low 刘谦益	Kuang Baomin 邝保民	Yun Xiang, Yun Jun and Si Yuan's father Humorous and loves to talk about life and principles. Bribed to kill Mei Shan for evidence on Infinite's money-laundering activities.	
Cavin Soh 苏智诚	Guo Zijian 郭子建	Private detective under Chang Yu; Former gambling addict.	
Eden Ang 翁于腾	Huang Shi 黄石	Chang Yu's responsible assistant and online hacker. Forced to betray Chang Yu unwillingly after being backmailed indirectly by Le Tian (Slyfox). Died in Episode 18.	

== Episodes ==
No.	Title	Original release date
1	"Episode One"	October 28, 2013
2	"Episode Two"	October 29, 2013
3	"Episode Three"	October 30, 2013
4	"Episode Four"	October 31, 2013
5	"Episode Five"	November 1, 2013
6	"Episode Six"	November 4, 2013
7	"Episode Seven"	November 5, 2013
8	"Episode Eight"	November 6, 2013
9	"Episode Nine"	November 7, 2013
10	"Episode Ten"	November 8, 2013
11	"Episode Eleven"	November 11, 2013
12	"Episode Twelve"	November 12, 2013
13	"Episode Thirteen"	November 13, 2013
14	"Episode Fourteen"	November 14, 2013
15	"Episode Fifteen"	November 15, 2013
16	"Episode Sixteen"	November 18, 2013
17	"Episode Seventeen"	November 19, 2013
18	"Episode Eighteen"	November 20, 2013
19	"Episode Nineteen"	November 21, 2013
20	"Episode Twenty (Finale)"	November 22, 2013

== Overseas broadcast ==
According to series premiere date:

Country	Network(s)	Series premiere	Timeslot
Malaysia	Astro Shuang Xing	November 14, 2013 - December 11, 2013	Mondays to Fridays 16:30 pm (UTC+08:00); Repeat Mondays to Fridays 15:30 pm
Malaysia	Astro AEC	TBA	Mondays to Fridays 20:30 pm (UTC+08:00)
Malaysia	Astro Quan Jia HD	TBA	Mondays to Fridays 20:30 pm (UTC+08:00)
Indonesia	MediaCorp 8 International		Mondays to Fridays 19:00 pm (UTC+07:00)

== See also ==
- Wawa Pictures
- List of Disclosed episodes
- List of programmes broadcast by Mediacorp Channel 8
