= Mind Matters =

2018 Singaporean TV series

- 心。情
- Genre: Drama; Romance; Family; Psychological
- Written by: Tang Yeow 陈耀
- Directed by: Doreen Yap 叶佩娟; Oh LiangCai 胡凉财
- Starring: Qi Yuwu; Jesseca Liu
- Opening theme: 给我一个 By Boon Hui Lu
- Ending theme: 1) 身体都知道 by Hebe Tien; 2) 马桶 by Qi Yuwu; 3) 好不容易 by Teresa Tseng
- Country of origin: Singapore
- Original language: Chinese
- No. of episodes: 20

Production
- Executive producer: Soh Bee Lian 苏美莲
- Running time: approx. 45 minutes (excluding advertisements)

Original release
- Network: Mediacorp Channel 8
- Release: 8 February – 11 March 2018

Related
- 118 Reunion; Doppelganger

Mind Matters (Chinese: 心。情) is a 20-episode drama series produced by Mediacorp Channel 8. The show aired at 9pm on weekdays and had a repeat telecast at 8am the following day. It stars Qi Yuwu and Jesseca Liu as the casts of this series.

== Cast ==
- Qi Yuwu as Zhuo Jinshu 卓瑾澍, a plumber who was previously a celebrity psychiatrist. He has complex post-traumatic stress disorder (C-PTSD).
- Jesseca Liu as Qin Xiuxiu 秦秀秀, a tailor who has both obsessive–compulsive and post-traumatic stress disorder.
- Teresa Tseng as Lu Haining 卢海宁, a celebrity psychiatrist who has bulimia nervosa.
- Florence Tan as Zhou Riqing 周日晴, a clothes seller who has Bipolar I disorder.
- Chen Tianwen as Lu Liangsheng 陆亮声, a school teacher with a sexual fetish.
- Shane Pow as Hu Ruiming 胡锐铭, a free-lance software engineer who suffered from agoraphobia and panic disorder.
- Denise Camillia Tan as Zhang Siya 章偲雅, an undergraduate student who works as a part-time model and suffered from schizophrenia.
- Ben Yeo as Chen Weiyi 陈伟毅 who suffered from mild social anxiety.
- Sora Ma as Song Jiefang 宋洁芳 who suffered from delusional disorder.
- Ivan Lo 卢楷浚 as Fang Zhixing 方智星 who suffered from conduct disorder.
  - Cruz Tay as young Fang Zhixing
- Zhang Wei 张为 as Uncle David who suffered from hoarding disorder.
- Teo Ser Lee 张思丽 as Li Ting 丽婷 who owns a clothing shop at a neighbourhood estate
- Benjamin Heng as Fang Zhengye 方正业
- Patricia Seow 萧靖亲 as Mrs Pui

== Original Sound Track (OST) ==
No.	Song title	Singer(s)
1)	"给我一个"	Boon Hui Lu
2)	"身体都知道"	Hebe Tien
3)	"马桶:	Qi Yuwu
4)	"好不容易"	Teresa Tseng

== Accolades ==
Year	Ceremony	Category	Nominee(s)	Result	Ref
2019	Star Awards	Best Screenplay	Tang Yeow	Nominated	
2019	Star Awards	Young Talent Award	Ivan Lo	Nominated	
2019	Star Awards	Best Theme Song	"给我一个"	Nominated	
2019	Star Awards	Best Supporting Actor	Shane Pow	Nominated	
2019	Star Awards	Best Actor	Qi Yuwu	Nominated	

== See also ==
- List of MediaCorp Channel 8 Chinese drama series (2010s)
