= Luisa Gan =

Singaporean actress and model

- Born: Luisa Gan; 12 September 1994 (age 32); Singapore
- Occupations: Actress, Model
- Years active: 2014–2016

Chinese name
- Traditional Chinese: 顏爾
- Simplified Chinese: 颜尔
Transcriptions
Standard Mandarin
- Hanyu Pinyin: Yán Ěr

Luisa Gan (born 12 September 1994) is a former Singaporean actress, model and contracted artiste under MediaCorp. She was prominently a full-time Mediacorp artiste between 2015 and 2016.

She was Miss Singapore 2014 and she has represented Singapore in the Miss Universe pageant.

== Filmography ==
Year	Title	Role	Notes	Ref
2013	Gonna Make It	As herself		
2015	Ghost at Caldecott	Luisa		
2015	The Dream Makers II	Portrayed Herself		
2015	Life - Fear Not	Xia Tian		
2016	House of Fortune	Yang Meimei		
2016	Peace & Prosperity	Wati		
2016	If Only I Could	Rachel		
2016	I Want to Be a Star	Juliet		
2016	You Can Be an Angel 2	Su Li		

== Miss Universe 2016 ==
Year	Award	Results
2014	Miss Singapore	Won
2016	Miss Universe 2016	Nominated
