= Table of Glory =

- 乒乓圆
- Genre: Sports; Romance
- Written by: Ang Eng Tee (洪荣狄)
- Directed by: Zheng Bi Zhu 郑碧珠; Li Liwan李丽碗
- Starring: Joshua Ang; Dai Xiangyu; Teresa Tseng; Kym Ng; Guo Liang; Zheng Geping; Zhou Ying
- Opening theme: 乒乓圆 by Jeff Wang
- Ending theme: 哑谜 by Teresa Tseng
- Country of origin: Singapore
- Original language: Chinese
- No. of episodes: 20

Production
- Producer: Gabriel Cheong (钟建伟)
- Running time: approx. 45 minutes per episode

Original release
- Network: MediaCorp Channel 8
- Release: 1 April – 28 April 2009

Table of Glory (Chinese: 乒乓圆) is a Singaporean drama which was telecasted on Singapore's free-to-air channel, MediaCorp Channel 8. It made its debut on 1 April 2009 and ended on 28 April 2009. This drama serial consists of 20 episodes, and was broadcast every weekday at 9:00 pm.

== Plot ==
Since young, He Sheng Wu has had a passion for table tennis. His mother was a national player and she personally coached him and honed his skills as a table tennis player. However, ever since his mother's untimely death in an accident, Ah Wu became quiet and sullen and withdrew into his own shell. His performance in his studies and at work was affected and he was branded a “loser”. Ah Wu helps out at his father, He Yingxiong's laundry shop. His only comfort is in paddling a table tennis ball against a wall.

He Yingxiong is furious that his son is seemingly useless and wasting his life away paddling a table tennis ball against an empty wall on most days. He refuses to let Ah Wu play table tennis. However, Ah Wu resists all attempts to stop him from playing table tennis and continues to do so. Even though Ah Wu does not have any actual experience playing against a real opponent, and in fact could not even beat a young child at a game of table tennis, he possesses an innate talent for reading his opponent's moves and strategy in the game. This enables him to be the dark horse in some matches, coming back from the brink of defeat to win the game.

Ah Wu is a loner and his only friend is Mai Xiaofen whom he grew up with. Xiaofen is one of the top female table tennis players, but ever since losing the match with Mary-Ann, a table tennis newcomer, she has been teased about losing to a newcomer. Her mother, ex-national player Mai Tiantian, is her coach who pushes her hard to train herself to become a top player in the sport. However, Xiaofen lacks confidence. Since she started to play competitively, her personal best has always remained at fourth placing. This led to Xiaofen being nicknamed “Fourth Sister”.

Tiantian and Yingxiong are feuding neighbours and bicker constantly whenever they run into each other. Despite this, Ah Wu and Xiaofen get along fabulously. Ah Wu is secretly in love with Xiaofen but being inarticulate, finds it difficult to express his feelings for her. To make things worse, Xiaofen admires a new player in her table tennis team, the good-looking He Jiajun. Xiaofen admires Jiajun's skills as a table tennis player and is also infatuated with him thus making her oblivious to Ah Wu's quiet love and concern for her.

Zhang Ziyi is Xiaofen's trendy and cool teammate. She is an exceptionally skilled table tennis player and is billed to be the next big thing in table tennis. Jiajun is impressed and taken with Ziyi but she is indifferent to him. On the other hand, Ziyi prefers Ah Wu as she finds him sincere and looks for opportunities to spend time with Ah Wu and get to know him better.

With Ziyi's encouragement and support. Ah Wu starts to have dreams of becoming a table tennis player on the team. However, everyone ridicules him when he shared his dream and even Xiaofen tells him not to waste his time daydreaming. Ah Wu is undeterred as he loves table tennis. He tells himself that he will stop playing against an empty wall but instead, will step up to play against other table tennis players.

Ah Wu's luck turns for the better when his talent is spotted by the “King of Table Tennis”, Lin Dadi, who is determined to train Ah Wu to become a world-class player. The unorthodox training methods which Lin uses to coach Ah Wu pay off and the table tennis fraternity takes notice of Ah Wu who keeps winning his matches, including veteran players. Jiajun is determined to beat Ah Wu.

== Cast ==
=== Main Cast ===
- Joshua Ang as He Sheng Wu (何胜武)
- Dai Xiangyu as He Jia Jun (贺家军)
- Teresa Tseng as Mai Xiao Fen (麦晓芬)
- Zhou Ying as Zhang Zi Yi (张姿宜)
- Guo Liang as He Shuai (贺帅)
- Kym Ng as Mai Tian Tian (麦甜甜)
- Zheng Geping as He Ying Xiong (何英雄)

=== Supporting Cast ===
- Moo Yan Yee as Mary-Ann (马丽安)
- Rayson Tan as Jiang Xian (江贤)
- Ya Hui as Liu Yu (刘雨)
- Zhang Xinxiang as Lin Da Di (林大地)
- Jeremy Chan as Akira
- Alan Tern as Liu Yun (刘云)
- Leong Wai Keong (梁伟强) as Mai Shao Qiang (麦晓强)
- Constance Song as Zhang Yao (张瑶)
- Lin You Fa (林尤发) as Michael Angel

== Reception ==
Average viewership for each episode is 1,016,000.
