= Blk 88 =

- 大牌88
- Genre: Family; Comedy-satire
- Starring: Huang Wenyong; Lin Meijiao; Lin Peifen; Seah Kar Huat
- Country of origin: Singapore
- Original language: Mandarin
- No. of episodes: 14

Production
- Running time: 5 mins per webisode

Original release
- Release: 5 March – 16 April 2012

Blk 88 (大牌88) is a Singaporean Chinese language web series produced by MediaCorp in 2012. Webisodes are available on xinmsn's catch-up TV portal, an online portal run by MediaCorp in collaboration with msn.com, and were broadcast on Channel 8 after the initial release. It was commissioned by the Media Development Authority after the success of web mini-series Let's Play Love. Not only is it the first locally produced animated web series, it is also the first animated comedy series produced in Singapore. It stars veteran actors Huang Wenyong and Lin Meijiao and Y.E.S. 93.3FM deejays Lin Peifen and Seah Kar Huat (Xie Jiafa) as well as several guest artistes.

Like Let's Play Love, Blk 88 was also well received by netizens, especially for its humorous satirical references to familiar aspects of Singaporean life and society. It notably satirised the MRT breakdowns which happened in December 2011.

== Characters ==
- Sim Beng Huat 沈炳发 (voiced by Huang Wenyong 黃文永) - He is a "kiasu" 50-year-old husband of Bee Huay and father of two who works as a mid-level supervisor in a mid-sized company. Although filled with good-intentions, his clumsy nature often puts in awkward situations and sometimes results in disaster.
- Lee Bee Huay 李美花 (voiced by Lin Meijiao 林梅娇) - Having been married to Beng Huat for some 25 years, she is an experienced homemaker. Her straight-talking, dominating nature often overpowers her timid husband, who usually gives in to her. However, she is devoted to him and the children and does all she can to rekindle their marriage, often with mixed results.
- Tammy Sim 沈昙美 (voiced by Lin Peifen 林佩芬) - Beng Huat and Bee Huay's 24-year-old daughter. Trendy and sophisticated, she loves shopping for the latest things. She works as an artiste manager. Like her mother, she has a dominating personality and hates losing an argument.
- Tommy Sim 沈堂美 (voiced by Xie Jiafa 谢家发) - Tammy's 18-year-old younger brother, a polytechnic engineering student. He is a tech whiz and gamer who is a bit of a rebel at times. He will be going for NS soon and is still unsure of what he wants to do in life.

=== Guest artistes ===
- Dennis Chew - voices the student (ep 2).
- Chen Shucheng - voices Peter Choo (ep 3).
- Zhuo Wei Ming 卓玮铭 - voices the boyfriend of the supposedly "pregnant" woman (ep 2) and Max (ep 8).
- Qiu Sheng Yang 丘胜扬 - voices the taxi driver (ep 2) and Beng Huat's boss (ep 6).
- Pan Wei Jie 潘伟杰 - voices the flasher (ep 5).
- Gao Hui Bi 高慧碧 - voices Beng Huat's lady boss (ep 6).
- Chua En Lai - voices Tedison, the male model (ep 7).
- Liang Bo Dong 梁博栋 - voices Teck (ep 8).
- Zhang Jing Jie 张静洁 - voices Jenn (ep 8).
- Lin Pei Fen - voices Jenny (ep 8).
- Feng Mei Fang 冯美芳 - voices Jennifer (ep 8).
- Wu Yi Ling 吴依龄 - voices Little Cutie (ep 9).
- Yang Shi Bin 杨世彬 - voices Ah Kong (ep 10).
- Michelle Chong - voices both the doctor and the nurse (ep 11).

== Episodes ==
No.	Title	Original release date
1	"The Gamer《玩出火》"	November 7, 2012
2	"MRT Ride《环岛追追追》"	November 14, 2012
3	"Old Flame《妈妈的旧情人》"	November 21, 2012
4	"The Carpark《乌龙失车记》"	January 11, 2013
5	"The Flasher《脱光光·心慌慌》"	January 18, 2013
6	"Boss' Dinner《现代鸿门宴》"	January 25, 2013
7	"The Commercial 《老爸探班记》"	February 1, 2013
8	"iQuit《烟烟一吸惹的祸》"	March 8, 2013
9	"The Social Network《非死不可》"	March 15, 2013
10	"Ah Gong《阿公驾到》"	March 22, 2013
11	"MC King《谁是MC King？》"	April 26, 2013
12	"Pandemonium《美丽的假期》"	May 3, 2013
13	"Show Part 1《小岛大赢家》Part 1"	May 10, 2013
14	"Show Part 2《小岛大赢家》Part 2"	May 17, 2013
