= Shane Pow =

Singaporean actor (born 1990)

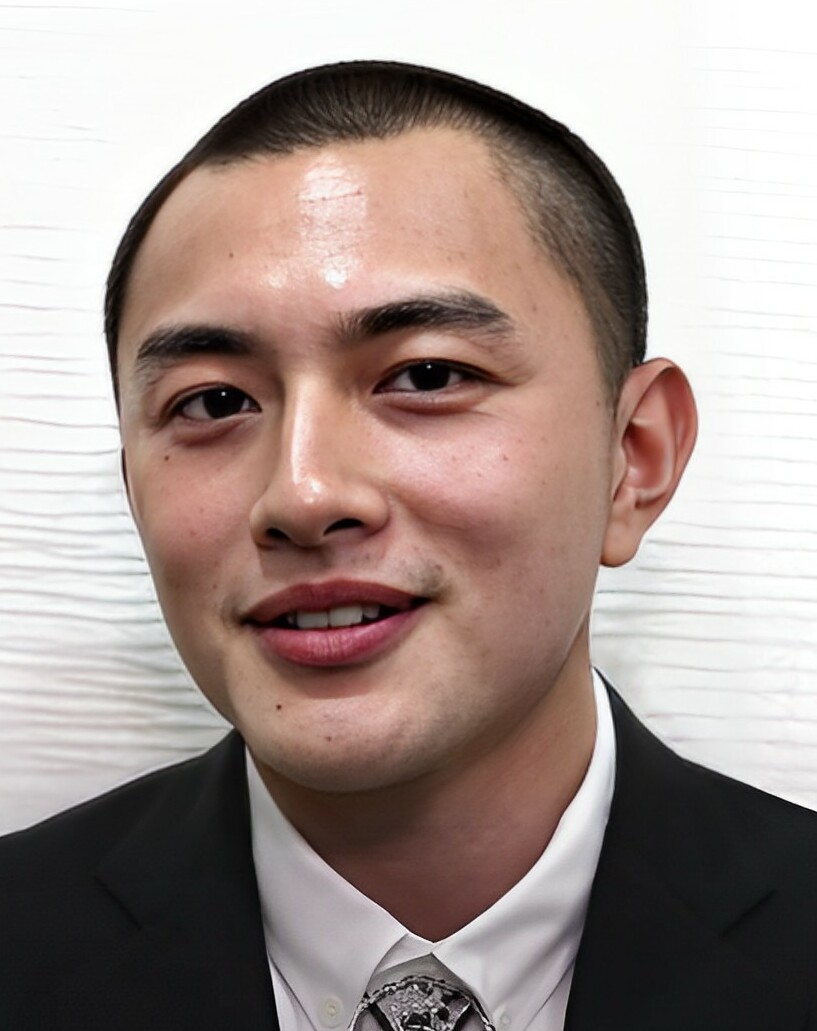
- Pow in May 2017
- Born: 4 October 1990 (age 36); Singapore
- Education: Woodlands Ring Secondary School
- Alma mater: Ngee Ann Polytechnic
- Occupations: Actor; host; businessman; model
- Years active: 2012-present
- Agent: Li Nanxing Global
- Awards: Star Awards 2015 - Star Awards 2017: Top 10 Most Popular Male Artistes

Chinese name
- Traditional Chinese: 包勳評
- Simplified Chinese: 包勋评
- Hanyu Pinyin: Bāo Xūnpíng

Shane Pow Xun Ping (born 4 October 1990) is a Singaporean actor, host and businessman.

== Early life ==
Pow has an elder sister. He was educated at Woodlands Ring Secondary School and Ngee Ann Polytechnic. Pow is an avid sportsman and has represented the Singapore National Youth Basketball team in international competitions before an unexpected injury forced him to stop competing competitively.

When Pow was 19, he was a part-time presenter for SPH RazorTV’s sports segment “Livewire”. He was talent scouted by a modelling agency, and began doing photography shoots such as the “Get Your Sexy Back” Campaign to encourage responsible drinking. In 2011, Shane signed up for the Manhunt Singapore 2011 contest. He was managed by Beam Artistes, which also had organised Manhunt Singapore 2011. After ManHunt, Shane secured cameo roles in numerous local dramas.

== Career ==
In 2012, Pow signed a contract with MediaCorp as an artiste after he had completed his National Service obligations. His breakthrough role came in 2012 as B Niu (B牛) in the local drama It Takes Two. He was also nominated for the Best Newcomer in the Star Awards 2013. He slowly rose to fame and obtained more significant roles in dramas such as Love At Risk and The Recruit diaries.

In 2014, Pow ventured into hosting, where he hosted Cheap and Good and also Style Check-in 4. He has also filmed Serve H.O.T, Against the Tide and Three Wishes that has awarded for Top 10 Most Popular Male Artistes in Star Awards 2015, 2016 and 2017. In 2015, he has filmed Family On The Edge and The Journey: Our Homeland. In 2016, he has filmed House of Fortune, Beyond Words and Peace & Prosperity and two toggle original series, I Want to Be a Star where his first leading role and Soul Reaper.

In September 2016, Pow, appeared on television in blackface after a casting director fails to find a person of African descent for a role in the drama series I Want to Be a Star. Pow's father in the series, played by veteran actor Chew Chor Meng, had said Indians and Africans are "all the same". In the following month, the episode was pulled from Mediacorp's online streaming service Toggle following a public outcry on social media for being racist.

In 2017, he had filmed When Duty Calls that gains his nomination for Best Supporting Actor in Star Awards 2018. On 12 December 2017, Pow signed on a management contract with Mediacorp, thus ending his working relationship with Beam Artistes. In 2018, he has filmed Mind Matters and Toggle original series, Die Die Also Must Serve and Love At Cavenagh Bridge.

On 26 April 2021, Mediacorp announced the termination of their contract with Pow after his second drink driving incident and breach of COVID-19 safe distancing measures. Pow would complete his pending work with Mediacorp's The Celebrity Agency until 4 May 2021. At the time of termination, Pow had roles in two upcoming dramas, Soul Old Yet So Young and The Heartland Hero. While his role in Soul Old Yet So Young was not affected due to the drama being in post-production stages, he was replaced by James Seah midway through the 130-episode The Heartland Hero as the drama was still being filmed. Pow would appear in the first 30 episodes, while Seah would be in the rest of the drama.

A day after the termination of his contract, Pow apologised for his actions while comedian Mark Lee offered to sign up Pow despite his charges.

On 31 May 2021, Pow was seen in a livestream by Mdada, a livestream sales company selling beauty products which was headed by Addy Lee, Pornsak Prajakwit and Michelle Chia. After his release from jail in the same year, Pow became a regular livestreamer on Mdada. In September, Pow joined Li Nanxing's management agency, LNX Global. Shortly after, he appeared in the Singaporean-South Korean film Ajoomma and also in a series of Mediacorp dramas including the telemovie My Star Bride - Hi, Mai Phương Thảo, Love At First Bite, Silent Walls and Family Ties.

== Ventures ==
In 2017, Pow opened an eatery, Mojo, with a friend, at Telok Ayer.

In 2020, Pow sold his shares in Mojo and open a Korean style hawker stall, Gogiyo, with three friends in Toa Payoh.

In 2023, Pow said that only one of the four Original Gogiyo outlets remain as things were tougher than expected.

== Personal life ==
=== Relationships ===
Pow has been romantically involved with radio presenter Kimberly Wang since 2016. However, in an interview in September 2021 after his release from jail, Pow declined to answer the breakup rumours of him and Wang.

=== Legal issues ===
==== Breach of Covid-19 measures ====
Pow was among a few celebrities who had breached the safe distancing measures adopted during the COVID-19 pandemic in Singapore in an incident that took place on 2 October 2020 while celebrating actor Jeffrey Xu's birthday. At the time of the celebration, group gatherings exceeded the maximum number of five participants. He was subsequently fined $300 and disciplined.

==== Drink driving ====
Pow was linked to two drink driving incidents. He was first convicted of drink driving on 30 July 2014 and was fined $2,300 and banned from driving for one year. On 17 September 2020, Pow was arrested for drink driving with 49 micrograms of alcohol per 100ml of breath, surpassing the legal limit of 35mcg. Pow was charged on 22 April 2021 with one count of driving under the influence of alcohol.

Pow pleaded guilty on 14 July 2021 and was sentenced to five weeks in jail, fined $6,000 and banned from driving for five years from his date of release.

== Filmography ==
=== Film ===
Year	Title	Role	Notes	Ref.
2022	My Star Bride - Hi, Mai Phương Thảo	Anh Vu / Xu Wenwu	Telemovie	
2022	Ajoomma	Sam		
2024	The Good Goodbye	Grandson	Feature film	

=== Television series ===
Year	Title	Role	Notes	Ref.
2012	Don't Stop Believin	Du Siwei		
2012	Poetic Justice	Alex	Cameo	
2012	It Takes Two	B-niu		
2013	C.L.I.F. 2	Shane Loh		
2013	The Recruit Diaries (阿兵新传)	Lin Daiyu		
2013	Love At Risk	Liao Yuanman		
2013	Disclosed	Kuang Siyuan		
2014	Served H.O.T (烧。卖)	Zhuang Haolun		
2014	Against The Tide	Liu Zebang		
2014	Three Wishes	Zhao Youting		
2015	Families on the Edge (一家都不能少)	Wang Haowei		
2015	The Journey: Our Homeland	Wan Zihua		
2016	House of Fortune	Bai Zhengyu		
2016	Beyond Words	Liang Yongxi		
2016	Peace & Prosperity	Huang Zihao		
2016	I Want to Be a Star	Zhong Dilong		
2016	Soul Reaper (勾魂使者)	Jude		
2017	Crescendo	David		
2017	When Duty Calls	Yao Weiguo		
2017	Faculty	Philip		
2018	Die Die Also Must Serve (战备好兄弟)	Wu Zhixing		
2018	Mind Matters	Hu Ruiming		
2018	Love At Cavenagh Bridge (加文纳桥的约定)	Don		
2018	The Distance Between (下个路口遇见你)	Warren		
2018	Dance With Me	Nat		
2019	Jalan Jalan (带你去走走)	Cui Dafeng		
2019	Remember Us This Way (到此一游)	Junjie	A Directorial Debut Project	
2019	C.L.I.F. 5	Li Xiaorong		
2020	All Around You (回路网)	Zhuang Weiren		
2020	14 Days (14天的同居人)	Allen		
2020	Super Dad (男神不败)	Chen Yu Yang		
2020	Mister Flower (花花公子)	Chen Da Tian		
2020	In The Wind	Nick Chua		
2021	The Heartland Hero	Zhong Yiyuan		
2021	Soul Old Yet So Young (心里住着老灵魂)	Wu Renyao		
2023	Love At First Bite (遇见你，真香！)	Chang Shengjun		
2023	Silent Walls	Lin Zhenping		
2023	Family Ties	Chen Boyang		

== Discography ==
=== Compilation albums ===
Year	English title	Mandarin title
2013	MediaCorp Music Lunar New Year Album 13	新传媒群星金蛇献祥福
2015	MediaCorp Music Lunar New Year Album 15	新传媒群星金羊添吉祥
2016	MediaCorp Music Lunar New Year Album 16	新传媒群星金猴添喜庆
2020	MediaCorp Music Lunar New Year Album 20	裕鼠鼠纳福迎春乐

== Awards and nominations ==
Year	Ceremony	Category	Nominated work	Result
2013	Star Awards	Best Newcomer	It Takes Two (as B-Niu)	Nominated
2015	Star Awards	Toggle Outstanding Duke Award	—N/a	Nominated
2015	Star Awards	Top 10 Most Popular Male Artistes	—N/a	Won
2016	Star Awards	Top 10 Most Popular Male Artistes	—N/a	Won
2016	Fame Award 2016	Best Actor in a Supporting Role	The Journey: Our Homeland (as Wan Zihua)	Nominated
2017	Star Awards	Top 10 Most Popular Male Artistes	—N/a	Won
2017	Star Awards	London Choco Roll Happiness Award	House Of Fortune (as Bai Zhengyu)	Nominated
2018	Star Awards	Bioskin Most Charismatic Artiste Award	When Duty Calls (as Gordon Yeoh)	Nominated
2018	Star Awards	Best Supporting Actor	When Duty Calls (as Gordon Yeoh)	Nominated
2019	Star Awards	Best Supporting Actor	Mind Matters (as Hu Ruiming)	Nominated
2021	Star Awards	Top 10 Most Popular Male Artistes	—N/a	Nominated
2023	Star Awards	Top 10 Most Popular Male Artistes	—N/a	Nominated
2024	Star Awards	Top 10 Most Popular Male Artistes	—N/a	Nominated
