= C.L.I.F. 5 =

Singaporean TV series

- 警徽天职之海岸卫队
- Genre: Police procedural Action/Thriller
- Directed by: Oh Liang Cai; Gao Shu Yi
- Starring: Rebecca Lim; Pierre Png; Shane Pow; Nick Teo; He Ying Ying
- Opening theme: "Half" ("半") by Joyce Gim
- Country of origin: Singapore
- Original languages: Mandarin, with some English dialogue
- No. of episodes: 20

Production
- Executive producer: Loh Woon Woon
- Running time: approx. 45 minutes

Original release
- Network: Mediacorp Channel 8
- Release: 23 September – 18 October 2019

Related
- C.L.I.F. (2011); C.L.I.F. 2 (2013); C.L.I.F. 3 (2014); C.L.I.F. 4 (2016)

C.L.I.F. 5
- Traditional Chinese: 警徽天職之海岸卫队
- Simplified Chinese: 警徽天职之海岸卫队
Transcriptions
Standard Mandarin
- Hanyu Pinyin: Jǐng Huī Tiān Zhí Zhí Hăi ań wěi duì

C.L.I.F. 5 (Chinese: 警徽天职之海岸卫队) is a Singapore police procedural series produced and telecast on Mediacorp Channel 8 in collaboration with the Singapore Police Force. This is the fifth installment to C.L.I.F. in 2011, and this 20-episode series was first telecast from 23 September to 18 October 2019 on free-to-air TV in Singapore. The series centers on events happening in the Police Coast Guard and stars Rebecca Lim, Pierre Png, Shane Pow, Nick Teo, and He Ying Ying as the main casts of the reboot installment. This series is co-sponsored by Sheng Siong Supermarkets, Daikin, and the Singapore Police Force.

== Synopsis ==
Wang Man Ting is an officer with the Police Coast Guard (PCG). Le Xiao Tian, CEO of an electronic company is arranging an illegal immigration. In order to create confusion for the police, he orders Guo Tai, the boss of a fish farm to kill his enemy Lucas. In order to find the killer, Man Ting arrives at Guo Tai's fish farm and takes him hostage...

== Cast ==
- Rebecca Lim as Wang Man Ting (王曼婷)
- Pierre Png as Inspector Seow Feng Chek (萧峰泽)
- Rayson Tan as Wang Shi Tong (王世通)
- Wang Yuqing as Lu Guotai (陆国泰)
- Weber Yang as Lu Jiaming
- James Seah as Lu Jiahao
- Bonnie Loo as Lu Kexin
- Guo Liang as Le Xiaotian (乐笑天)
- Zheng Geping as Superintendent Tay Kuan Seng
- Nick Teo as Sergeant Seow Yi Shou
- Joel Choo as Senior Staff Sergeant Aden Thiam Jun Xiong
- Benjamin Cheah as Senior Staff Sergeant Ang Jin Yun
- Brandon Wong as Superintendent Goh Tze Wai
- Kayly Loh as Sergeant Peh Xue Ying
- Adam Chen as Yao Bao Bing
- Allan Wu as Alexis
- Joey Feng as Zhang Yaqi
- Goh Wee Ann as Xiao Huiwen
- Pan Lingling as Lin Meizhen
- Cynthia Koh as Li Xiaoying
- Shane Pow as Li Xiaorong
- Chen Tianwen as Lucas Chew
- Eelyn Kok as Ruby
- Erika Tan as Jess
- Wilson Lee as Louis
- Amit Gilboa as Dr Johnson

== Awards and nominations ==
Year	Award	Category	Nominees	Result	Ref
2021	Star Awards	Young Talent Award	Goh Wee An	Won	
2021	Star Awards	Best Supporting Actress	Bonnie Loo	Nominated	
2021	Star Awards	Best Supporting Actor	James Seah	Nominated	
2021	Star Awards	Best Drama Serial	C.L.I.F. 5	Nominated	
