= Denise Camillia Tan =

Malaysian actress (born 1992)

Denise Camillia
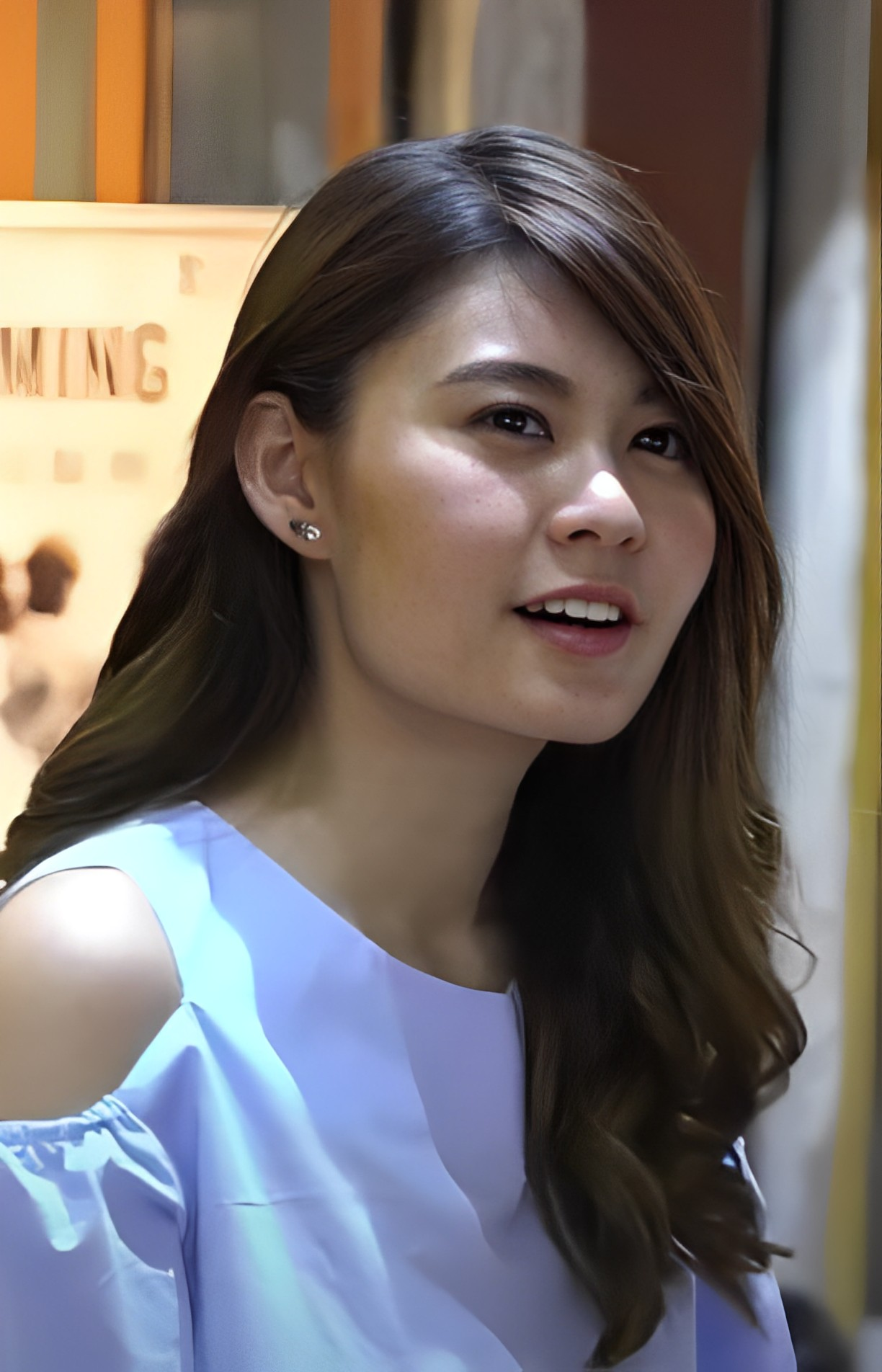
- Born: 6 November 1992 (age 33); Selangor, Malaysia
- Education: College
- Occupations: Actress; Host; Singer
- Years active: 2013–present
- Height: 168 cm (5 ft 6 in)

Chinese name
- Traditional Chinese: 陳楚寰
- Simplified Chinese: 陈楚寰
- Hanyu Pinyin: Chén Chǔhuán

Denise Camillia Tan (Chinese: 陈楚寰, born 6 November 1992) is a Malaysian actress based in Singapore. She was a fashion design college student. She won the titles of Miss Astro Chinese International Pageant, Miss Most Photogenic and Miss Best Talent in the 2012 Miss Astro Chinese International Pageant and is the first runner-up in 2013 Miss Chinese International Pageant.

Tan made her acting debut in 2016, in the Malaysian-Hong Kong production, The Hiddens, and was later based in Singapore for her acting career. In 2023 she won an award for the Top 10 Most Popular Female Artiste in the 2023 Star Awards. She is currently a female artist under the contract with MediaCorp The Celebrity Agency.

== Career ==
Tan participated in the 2012 Miss Astro Chinese International Pageant, a beauty pageant in Malaysia in 2012 which she was crowned winner at the age of 19. She participated in the Miss Chinese InternationalPageant 2013 and was the first runner-up for it.

Tan made her acting debut in 2016, in the Malaysian-Hong Kong production, The Hiddens, starring as a killer in the drama.

From May 2017 to February 2020, Tan was the co-host on the outdoor cooking segment in the variety show The Sheng Siong Show, replacing Seraph Sun. She has since been replaced by Seow Sin Nee.

== Personal life ==
Tan is a Singaporean permanent resident.

== Filmography ==
=== Television series ===
Year	Title	Role	Notes	Ref
2013	Outbound Love	May		
2014–2015	Bright Times (闪亮的时刻)	Hong Laoshi		
2016	The Hiddens	Rachel		
2017	Legal Eagles	Liao Shasha		
2017	Have a Little Faith	Liang Siyu		
2017	While We Are Young	Zheng Jiayi		
2018	Mind Matters	Zhang Siya		
2018	Fifty & Fabulous (五零高手)	Jackie Ye Yunxi		
2018	Say Cheese	Elaine Lim		
2018	Heart To Heart (心点心)	Xiao Li		
2019	Limited Edition (我是限量版)	Camilla		
2019	Hello Miss Driver (下一站，遇见)	Lin Yulin		
2019	I See You (看见看不见的你)	Li Kai-en		
2019	All Is Well - Singapore (你那边怎样，我这边OK)	Liew Yipei		
2019	Day Break (天空渐渐亮)	Ye Huiyi		
2020	Happy Prince (快乐王子)	Tian Niuniu		
2020	14 Days (14天的同居人)	Claris		
2020	How Are You 2 (好世谋2)	Hui Guniang		
2021	CTRL	Du Enzhe		
2021	Key Witness (关键证人)	Xu Guoying		
2021	The Heartland Hero	Emma		
2022	I Want to be a Tow Kay (亲家冤家做头家)	Kam Wenyu		
2022	In Safe Hands (守护星)	Fang Xuanwen		
2023	Family Ties	Chen Yun'en		
2024	Never Too Late (最佳遗产)	Ding Yonghan		
2025	Where the Heart Belongs (心有所依)	Ming Zhen		

=== Variety show ===
Year	Title	Notes
	学习变变变，魔法8周年	Children Program
2013	Denise's Okinawa Diary	
2013	Football Overload - Season 3	Guest (Episode 31)
2014	Super Comedian	
2014	D's Diary Taichung	
2015	Budget Foodie	
2015	XTY Kids Talent Show – Season 4	
2015	All Things Girl	Segment host
2016	Astro Battleground	
2016	We Are An “Ordinary” Cooking Show	
2016	The Travelers	
2017–2020	The Sheng Siong Show	Segment host
2023	The Sheng Siong Show	Guest host

== Awards and nominations ==
Year	Ceremony	Category	Nominated work	Result	Ref
2021	Star Awards	Top 10 Most Popular Female Artistes	—N/a	Nominated	
2023	Star Awards	Top 10 Most Popular Female Artistes	—N/a	Won	
2024	Star Awards	Top 10 Most Popular Female Artistes	—N/a	Nominated	
2025	Star Awards	Top 10 Most Popular Female Artistes	—N/a	Won	
