= Nick Teo =

Singaporean actor

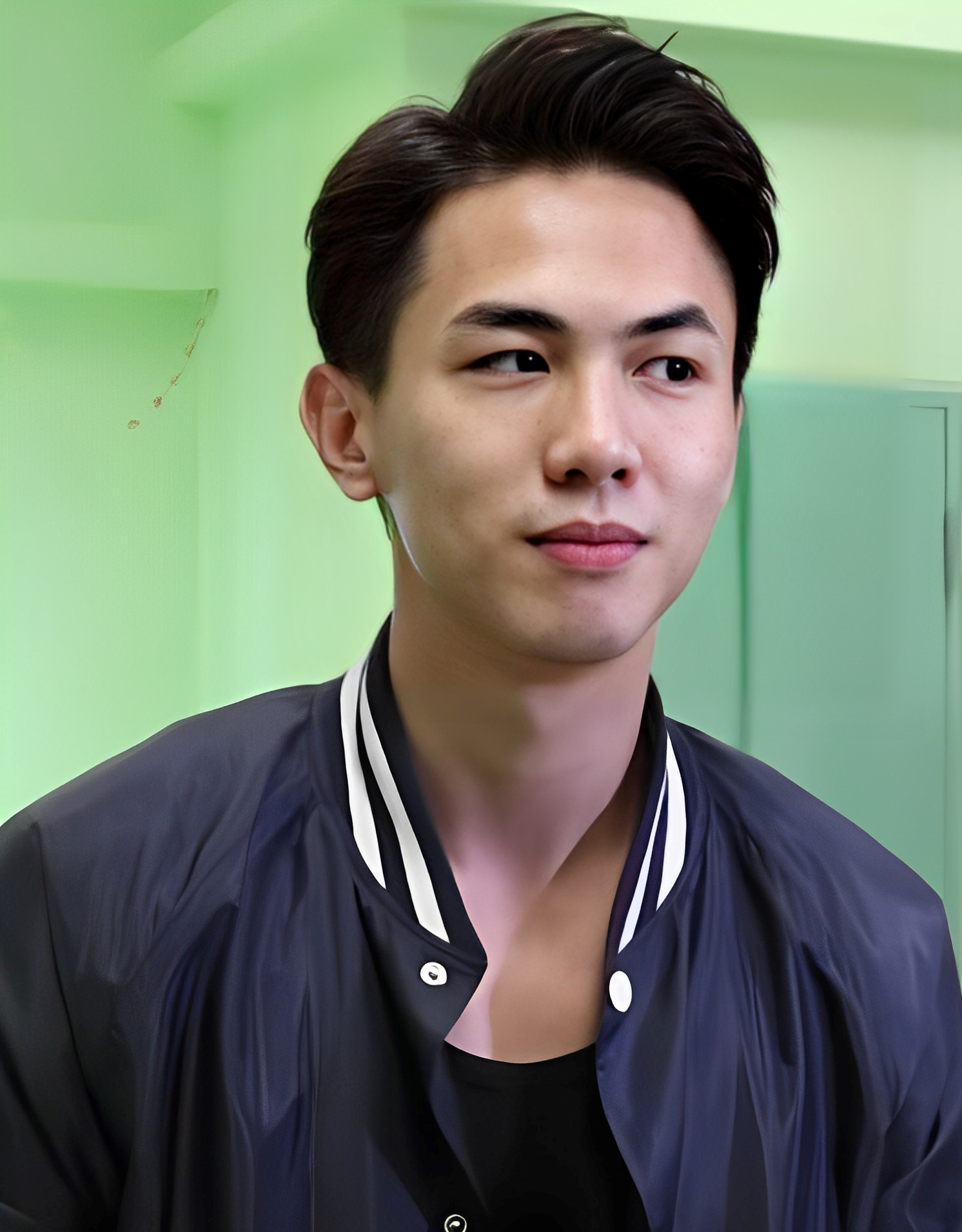
- Teo in May 2017
- Born: Teo Chee Cheng; Singapore
- Education: Ngee Ann Polytechnic
- Occupations: Actor; host; model
- Years active: 2012−present
- Spouse: Hong Ling (m. 2023)

Current stage name
- Traditional Chinese: 張奕愷
- Simplified Chinese: 张奕恺
- Hanyu Pinyin: Zhāng Yìkǎi

Birth name
- Traditional Chinese: 張植清
- Simplified Chinese: 张植清
- Hanyu Pinyin: Zhāng Zhíqīng

Former stage name
- Traditional Chinese: 張鈞淯
- Simplified Chinese: 张钧淯
- Hanyu Pinyin: Zhāng Jūnyù

Nick Teo Chee Cheng is a Singaporean actor, host and model.

== Career ==
Teo started his career as model and was discovered in 8 Days Shirtless Guys Search as winner in 2012.

In 2014, Teo made his first acting debut in a half-hour long-running drama series produced by Mediacorp Channel 8, 118, which made got him nominated for Best Newcomer award in Star Awards 2015. He has a fanclub called Nick Teo Fanclub 恺心时段.

In 2015, he filmed Life - Fear Not and made a cameo appearance in The Journey: Our Homeland, Love In Air & You Can Be an Angel Too.

In 2016, he filmed two half-an hour long-running drama series in 118 II & Peace & Prosperity. He also made cameo appearance in Eat Already?, I Want to Be a Star & The Dream Job.

In 2017, he landed a leading role in toggle original series, Dear DJ and made cameo appearance in The Lead & Dream Coder. He made a cameo appearance in a movie directed by Jack Neo, Ah Boys to Men 4.

In 2018, he filmed a toggle original series, Die Die Also Must Serve. Teo have juggled with two toggle original series Divided & Love At Cavenagh Bridge and also two drama Blessing 2 & 29th February.

In 2019, he acted in a Directorial Debut Project called If Only. He acted in 3 dramas called Hello From The Other Side which debuted in March 2019, While You Were Away which debuted in June 2019 and C.L.I.F. 5 which debuted in September 2019. He also made a cameo appearance in My One In A Million.

In 2023, he was nominated for the Top 10 Most Popular Male Artistes of which he didn't win. He would later win his first Top 10 award in 2026 after three nominations.

== Personal life ==
Teo is a Christian. In 2022, Teo changed his Chinese name from 张鈞淯 (Zhāng Jūnyù) to 张奕恺 (Zhāng Yìkǎi) as he felt that it was hard for most to pronounce.

Teo started dating fellow Mediacorp actor Hong Ling after starring in the long-form drama series 118 together. They founded the bird's nest brand House of the Swiftlet in January 2019. After seven years of dating, the couple announced their engagement in August 2022 and married on 14 December 2023.

== Filmography ==
=== Television series ===
Year	Title	Role	Notes	Ref.
2014	118	Zhang Zhenhui		
2014	Ghost at Caldecott	Dong Dong		
2015	You Can Be an Angel Too	Ken	Cameo	
2015	Love In Air	Zhang Junyu	Cameo	
2015	The Journey: Our Homeland	Hong Guoshun	Cameo	
2015	Life - Fear Not	Wang Hongzhi		
2016	The Dream Job	Applicant	Cameo	
2016	Peace & Prosperity	Zhao Renyi		
2016	I Want to Be a Star	Du Yiyang		
2016	Eat Already?	Meimei's Brother	Cameo	
2016	118 II	Zhang Zhenhui		
2017	Dream Coder	Max	Cameo	
2017	The Lead	Deng Yongkang	Cameo	
2017	Dear DJ	Dane Lin Kai		
2018	Die Die Also Must Serve	Nathan		
2018	Love At Cavenagh Bridge	Nick		
2018	Divided	Li Renwei		
2018	29th February	Wu Weixiong		
2018	Blessings 2	Li Dongliang		
2019	Hello From The Other Side	Ma Yucheng		
2019	If Only	Hong Ah'hui	A directorial debut project	
2019	While You Were Away	Wu Senjian		
2019	My One In A Million	Wen Zihao		
2019	C.L.I.F. 5	Xiao Yishou		
2020	A Quest to Heal	Alex	Cameo	
2020	Super Dad	Alfred		
2020	Mister Flower	He Zhongting		
2020	Bittersweet Love	Leo		
2021	Watch Out! Alexius	Ron		
2021	Key Witness	Aaron		
2021	Mr Zhou's Ghost Stories@Job Haunting	Aiden		
2022	In Safe Hands	Pan Zhichen		
2022	I Want To Be A Towkay	Kris Lee		
2022	When Duty Calls 2	Apollo		
2022	Soul Detective	Brad Kong		
2022	Healing Heroes	Zhou Yifan		
2023	Fix My Life	Zhou Andao		
2023	Shero	Guan Junsheng		
2024	Furever Yours	Zhou Chongliang		
2025	Emerald Hill - The Little Nyonya Story (小娘惹之翡翠山)	Zhang Yaozu		

=== Film ===
Year	Title	Role	Notes	Ref.
2017	Ah Boys to Men 4	Corporal First Class Richard Tan		

== Awards and nominations ==
Organisation	Year	Category	Nominated work	Result	Ref.
Star Awards	2015	Best Newcomer	—N/a	Nominated	
Star Awards	2023	Top 10 Most Popular Male Artistes	—N/a	Nominated	
Star Awards	2024	Top 10 Most Popular Male Artistes	—N/a	Nominated	
Star Awards	2025	Top 10 Most Popular Male Artistes	—N/a	Nominated	
