= Market stall =

Temporary merchandise structure

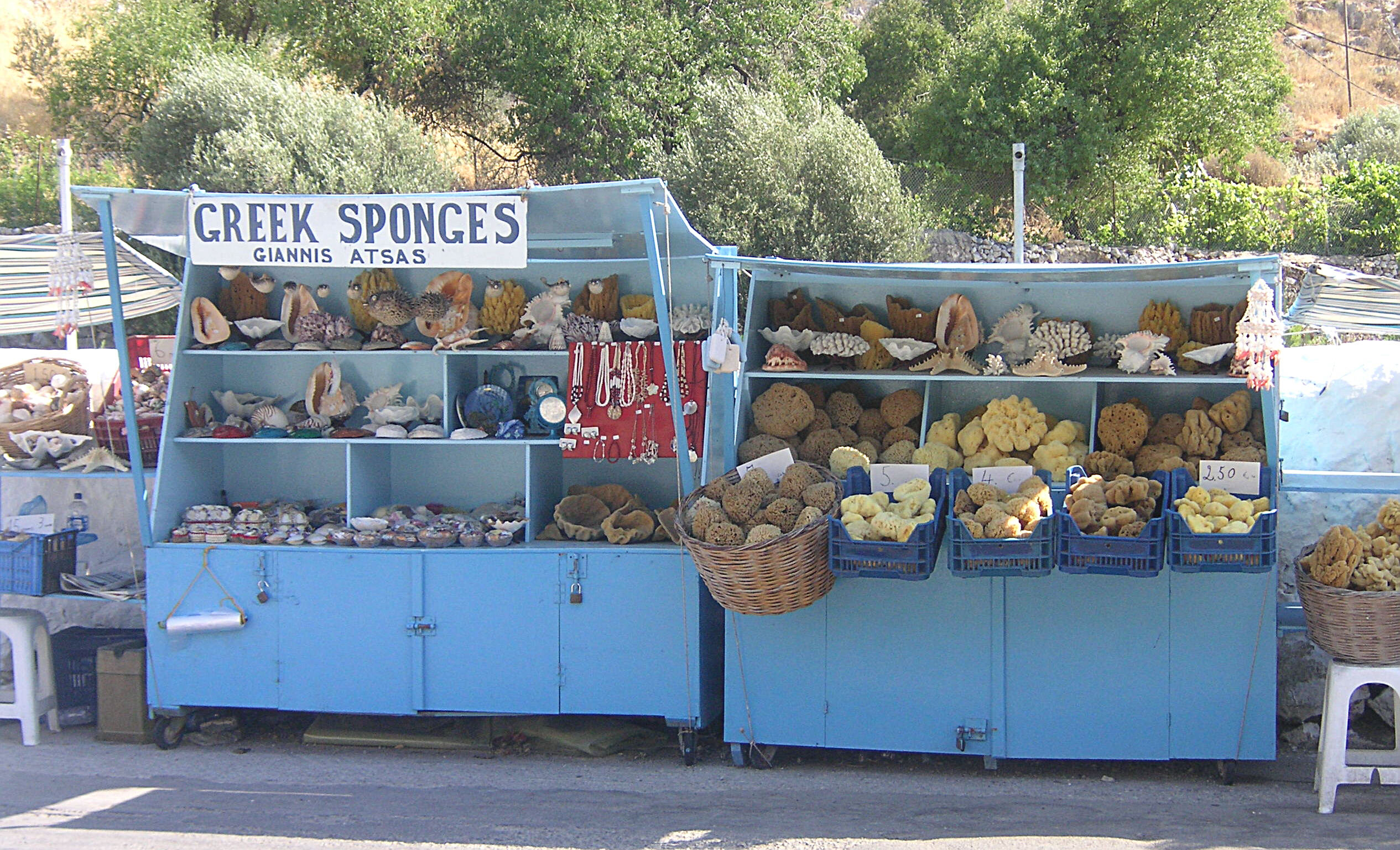
Sponges are sold at this roadside stall near Akti Bay on the island of Kalymnos, Greece.

A market stall or market booth, is a structure used by merchants to display and house their merchandise in a street market, fairs and conventions. Some commercial marketplaces, including market squares or flea markets, may permit more permanent stalls. Stalls are also used throughout the world by vendors selling street food.

There are many types of stalls, including carts designed to be pulled by hand or cycles; makeshift structures like tents, or converted tow-caravans and motor vehicles.

Market stalls can also provide an effective means of testing buyer responses to new products.

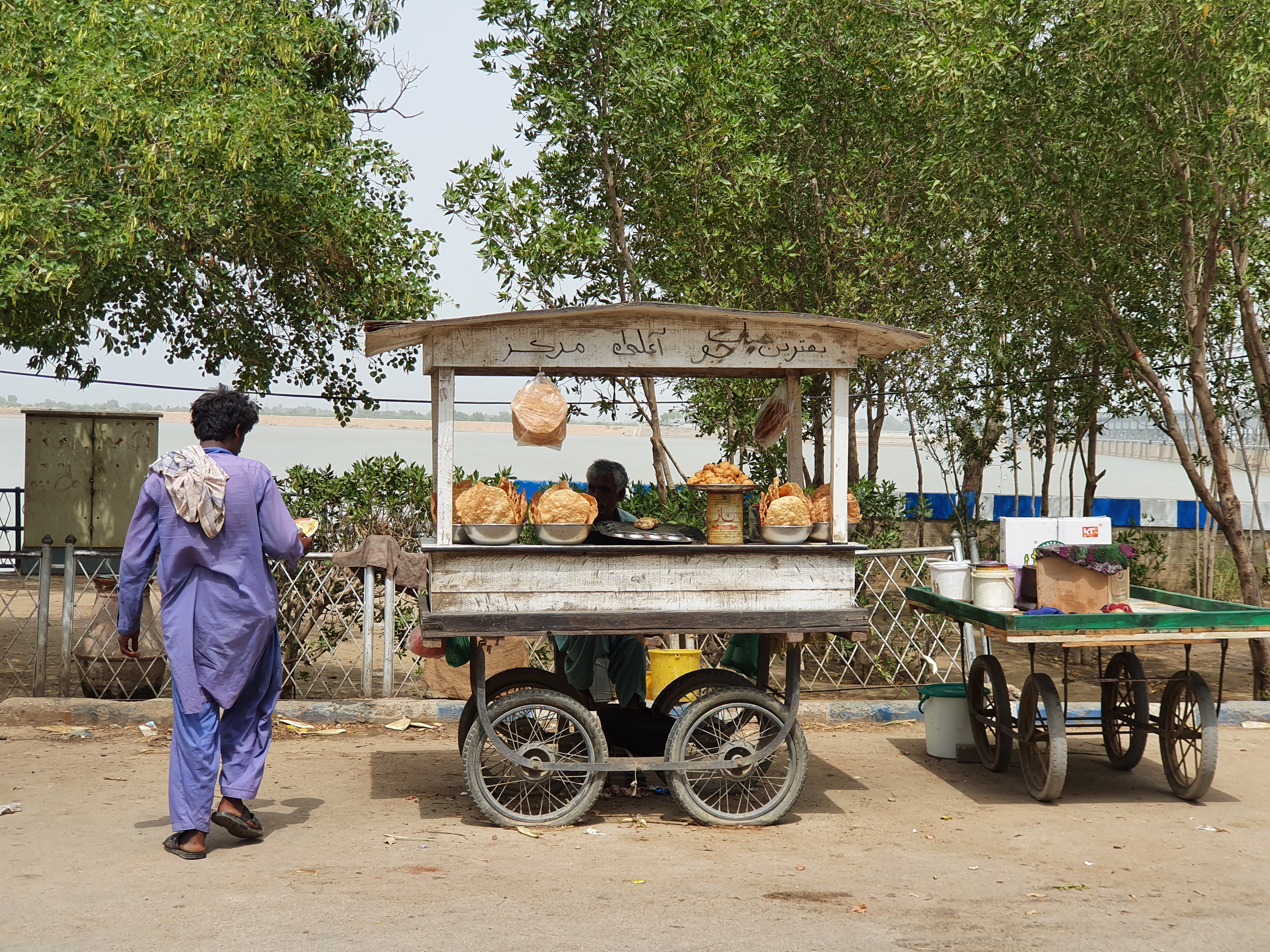
A vendor selling panipuri in Jamshoro, Pakistan.
