= Annabel Tan =

Singaporean model (born 1984)

- Born: Annabel Tan; December 27, 1984 (age 41); Singapore
- Height: 5 ft 7 in (1.70 m)
- Beauty pageant titleholder
- Title: Female Magazine 50 Most Gorgeous People (Winner)

Annabel Tan is a social worker, beauty pageant contestant and a model. Tan was a beauty contest winner for Female's 50 Most Gorgeous People 2009 competition.

== Education ==
Tan graduated from Anglo-Chinese Junior College in 2002. In 2006, she graduated from University of Western Australia with a bachelor in English Communication Studies Tan has attended a theology college.

== Career ==
Tan is a social worker. Tan took a break from work to enter full-time modelling and focusing on the Miss Singapore Universe 2010 pageant but only emerged as a first runner-up in the Miss Singapore Universe 2010 finals.

=== Female 50 Most Gorgeous People 2009 ===
Tan competed in her first beauty contest in 2009, which she won. Female 50 Most Gorgeous People is a local beauty pageant organized by Singapore Press Holdings Limited.

Tan was also the first winner to walk away with 4 out of 5 subsidiary titles during the pageant, including Most Dynamic Female, StudioLine Style Siren, Ms Bebe-licious and RISIS Most Radiant.

=== Miss Singapore Universe 2010 ===
Tan is a finalist of the Miss Singapore Universe 2010 pageant which is to be held on 28 May 2010. Annabel emerged as the first runner-up in the Miss Singapore Universe 2010 finals.

=== Model ===
As a model, Tan is the official model for Singapore Skincare EsteticaBeauty in 2010. The advertisement first appeared on Singapore national television channels under Mediacorp.

She is no stranger to print advertisements, modelling for Singapore's Female Magazine and Nuyou Magazine.

=== Youth Ambassador ===
As a social worker, Tan is a youth volunteer at Youth Empire. She has been to numerous mission trips. She is appointed as Health Promotion Board ambassador for World No Tobacco Day 2010. The campaign will be launched on 29 May 2010, a day after the Miss Singapore Universe 2010 grand finals.
