= Rachel Kum =

Singaporean entrepreneur (born 1985)

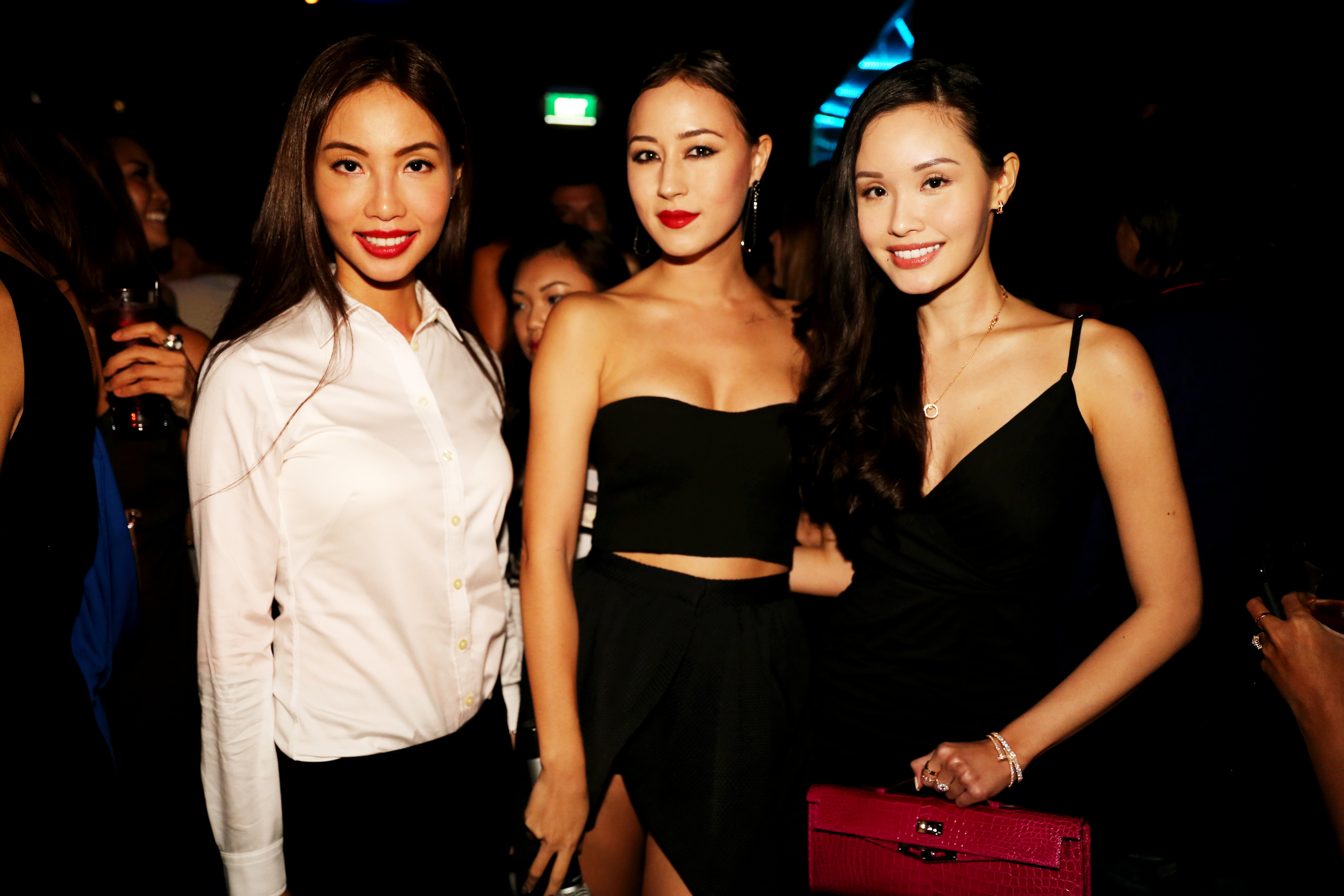
- Kum (right) with Lynn Tan (left) and Lisa Crosswhite (centre) at the LARUICCI Singapore launch event on 20 November 2014
- Born: Rachel Janice Kum; 8 April 1985 (age 41); Singapore
- Height: 5 ft 7 in (1.70 m)
- Beauty pageant titleholder
- Title: Miss Singapore Universe 2009

Rachel Kum (born 8 April 1985) is a Singaporean entrepreneur, model and beauty pageant titleholder. She co-founded the Singaporean company Rachel K Cosmetics. She won Miss Singapore Universe 2009 and represented Singapore in the Miss Universe 2009 pageant which was held at the Atlantis Paradise Island in Nassau, Bahamas on 23 August 2009.

== Career ==
Born and raised in Singapore, Kum graduated from Finance at the University of Western Australia. She created her own cosmetic brand, Rachel K Cosmetics.

In 2009, Kum was featured in a Windows commercial on AXN Asia television.
