= VIC (TV series) =

Chinese-language television series

- 维多利亚的模力
- Genre: Modelling; Media Industry; Supernatural; Mystery
- Written by: 司徒毕 陈耀
- Directed by: Koh Siew Hui 高秀慧
- Starring: Carrie Wong 黄思恬; Desmond Tan 陈炯江; Sheila Sim 沈惠怡; Steven Chiang 江常辉; Irene Ang 洪爱玲; Jasmine Sim 沈家玉; Cheryl Chou 周智慧
- Opening theme: Watch Me by Ling Kai 铃凯
- Country of origin: Singapore
- Original languages: Mandarin, with some English dialogue
- No. of episodes: 16 (with 3 alternate endings)

Production
- Producer: Leong Lye Lin 梁来玲
- Running time: approx. 25 minutes

Original release
- Network: Toggle
- Release: 19 April – 8 June 2018

Related
- A Lonely Fish; The Stories Between Us

VIC (Chinese: 维多利亚的模力) is a Toggle Original drama series. It was originally released on Toggle on Thursdays, and later aired on Mediacorp Channel U on Sundays. The show depicts the media and modelling industry, and contains some supernatural elements. It was the first Toggle Original Series to be nominated for Best Drama Serial, Best Theme Song and Best Actress for Star Awards. It stars model-actress Sheila Sim, Carrie Wong, Desmond Tan, Irene Ang, Steven Chiang, Jasmine Sim and Cheryl Chou as the main cast. The cast also includes real-life models and past contestants of Miss Universe Singapore.

== Synopsis ==
Vicky takes part in a reality show Fresh Off The Runway, hoping to become a top model. The executive producer of the show, Cao Shi Ren hopes to create buzz in the media, and resorts to sending anonymous death threats to one of the contestants who happens to be Vicky. One thing leads to another, until one day she is accidentally electrocuted. The CEO of Victory Property, Victoria Lek happens to be visiting the set, gets entangled in the accident and ends up in Vicky’s body while her own is missing. She has no choice but to continue in Vicky’s body as a contestant in the reality show.

== Cast ==
=== Main cast ===
Cast	Role	Description	Episode Appeared
Carrie Wong 黄思恬	Vicky Zhan 詹予柔	23 year old Cosmetic salesgirl; Joined "Fresh Off The Runway"; Caused Victoria Lek to sprain her ankle; Received anonymous death threat in Episode 1; Electrocuted after falling into a swimming pool with Victoria Lek in Episode 2	1 - 2, Endings 1 - 3
Carrie Wong 黄思恬	Victoria Lek 厉胜男	Woke up in Vicky's body after the electrocution; Continued in "Fresh Off The Runway" to find the identity of the perpetrator; Enemies with Bingbing and Queenie; In love with Juno; 3 time winner of "Best Shot"; Almost fell off the rock climbing wall in Episode 5; Caused Tyson to be arrested in Episode 10; Identified by the "Human Puppet" as Victoria and attacked in Episode 11; Revealed to Juno that she is Victoria in Episode 12; Fell into the sea after being covered in itching powder in Episode 14; Attacked by the "Human Puppet" in Episode 16; Attacked from behind after coming in second for "Fresh Off the Runway" in Episode 16; (Returned to her body - Ending 1)	1 - 16, Ending 1
Irene Ang 洪爱玲	Victoria Lek 厉胜男	58 year old CEO of Victory Property; Boss of Allan; Sponsor for "Fresh Off The Runway"; Sprained ankle after being knocked into by Vicky; Electrocuted after falling into swimming pool with Vicky; Body missing and found in Episode 16	1 - 2, Endings 1 - 3
Irene Ang 洪爱玲	Vicky Zhan 詹予柔	Missing; Appeared in Episode 16; (Returned to her body - Ending 1)	16, Ending 1
Desmond Tan 陈炯江	Juno Woo 吴昇豪	Photographer and judge for "Fresh Off The Runway"; Vicky's childhood neighbour and playmate; In love with Vicky; Rescued Vicky from falling off the rock climbing wall in Episode 5; Helped Vicky get rid of her fear of heights; Trained Vicky for her pose off in Episode 8; Fought off the "Human Puppet" in Episode 11; Confessed to Vicky in Episode 12; Found out Vicky's true identity; Rescued Vicky from the "Human Puppet" again in Episode 16	1 - 16
Sheila Sim (Singaporean actress) 沈琳宸	Shen Bingbing 沈冰冰	Former supermodel; Producer and judge for "Fresh Off The Runway"; Against the ideas of Cao Shiren; Enemies with Vicky after being offended by her several times; In love with Juno; Unintentionally killed Prince in the shower; Personally apologised to Nicole; Was manipulated by Tyson in the past; Almost assaulted by Tyson in Episode 10, rescued by Juno	1 - 16
Steven Chiang 江常辉	Cao Shiren 曹世仁	Executive producer for "Fresh Off The Runway"; Resorts to unscrupulous methods for the show; Faked an anonymous death threat to Vicky and called the reporters in Episode 2; Insists on keeping Vicky to attract more views; Invited Tyson to be the guest in Episode 9; Manipulates Bingbing's emotions to make her agree with his ideas	1 - 6, 8, 10 - 16

=== Fresh Off The Runway ===
Cast	Role	Description	Episode Appeared
Steven Chiang 江常辉	Cao Shiren 曹世仁	See Main Cast	1 - 16
Sheila Sim 沈琳宸	Shen Bingbing 沈冰冰	See Main Cast	1 - 16
Desmond Tan 陈炯江	Juno Woo 吴昇豪	See Main Cast	1 - 16
Carrie Wong 黄思恬	Vicky Zhan 詹予柔	See Main Cast	1 - 16
Jasmine Sim 沈家玉	Suki	21 years old; Waitress; Came from a poor family; Hoped to become a professional model; Unknowingly poisoned Chunhua by feeding it chocolate, but was defended by Vicky; Became best friends with Vicky; Mad at Vicky thinking she manipulated her in Episode 10; Fell on the stage in Episode 16; Winner of "Fresh Off The Runway"; (Became a successful model - Mentioned in Ending 2)	1 - 16
Cheryl Chou 周智慧	Queenie	Villain: 25 years old; Online floral shop owner; Best performing contestant; Gordon's fiancée arranged by their family; Jealous of Vicky's interactions with Gordon; Enemies with Vicky; Revealed to cause Vicky's drowning accident in Episode 15; Sabotaged Suki by taking her shoes and causing her to fall on stage in Episode 16; Caught in the act on video and exposed by an online viewer; (Eliminated - Episode 16)	1 - 16
Erika Tan 陈蕙薰	Zen	25 years old; Yoga instructor and professional model; Was scammed by Tyson two years ago; Suffered a mental breakdown in Episode 14; Completed her performance after encouragement from Suki and Vicky; (Eliminated - Episode 15)	1 - 16
Shi Lim 林诗	Hannah	30 years old (faked age to be 26); Customer service officer; Indirectly sabotaged Beatrice; Enemies with Beatrice, but reconciled; Trapped in the toilet in the haunted school in Episode 11; Copied Suki's poses in Episode 14; Came in third for "Fresh Off The Runway"	1 - 16
Sharlin Dian 杉玲	Xena	24 years old; Car show model; Lost Prince, indirectly causing its death; Had an affair with Allan; Threatened by Queenie to sabotage Vicky in Episode 14; Apologised to Vicky and was criticised by her in Episode 15; Eliminated due to her dangerous behaviour; (Eliminated - Episode 15)	1 - 15
Valnice Yek 易佳憓	Junie	19 years old; Part-time actress; Suffers from bulimia; Stayed in the competition to not disappoint her mother; Fainted from stress after sighting a ghost in Episode 11; (Left - Episode 11)	1-11, 12, 15 - 16
Vanessa Peh 白婷婷	Fae	17 years old; Senior high school student; (Eliminated - Episode 10)	1 - 10, 15 - 16
Joeypink Lai 黎格欣	Dion	23 years old; Internet celebrity; Criticised by Nicole for using rabbit fur soft toys; Claimed to release private videos of the contestants; Taken legal action; (Eliminated - Episode 7)	1 - 7
Loh Ling Ying 卢玲穎	Beatrice	22 years old; Fitness instructor; Swapped clothes with Vicky after being convinced by Hannah in Episode 2; 15 photos reduced to 5; Enemies with Hannah, but reconciled; (Eliminated - Episode 5)	1 - 5, 15 - 16
Shu Yi 舒怡	Trinity	Villain due to mental illness: Writer and assistant for "Fresh Off The Runway"; Revealed to be the daughter of the "Human Puppet"; Attacked Vicky from behind at the backstage in Episode 16; Told Vicky she will never let her find Victoria; (Sent to mental institution - Episode 16)	1 - 16
Alan Yeo Thiam Hock 杨添福	Electrician	Villain "Human Puppet": Electrician for "Fresh Off The Runway"; Identified Vicky as Victoria; Attacked Vicky in Episodes 11 and 16; Identity revealed when Vicky took off his mask in Episode 16; Resented Victoria Lek for indirectly causing his wife to suffer a stroke	11 - 12, 15 - 16

=== Victory Property ===
Cast	Role	Description	Episode Appeared
Irene Ang 洪爱玲	Victoria Lek 厉胜男	See Main Cast	1 - 2
Jim Koh 许晋鸣	Allan	Employee of Victoria Lek; Died from gas poisoning in his home; Likely to be murdered; (Deceased - Episode 15)	1, 13 - 14
Pierre Png 方展发	Gordon	New CEO of Victory Property; Queenie's fiancé arranged by their family; Guest Judge for "Fresh Off The Runway"; Fascinated by Vicky's knowledge and views on real estate; Interested in taking in Vicky to the company; Personally picked Vicky for the "Best Shot"	13 - 15

=== Other characters ===
Cast	Role	Description	Episode Appeared
Chen Tianwen 陈天文	Security Guard	Security guard at Victoria Lek's residence; Chased Vicky away in Episode 2	2, 6
Timothee Yap 叶劲维	Himself	Sportsman; Guest judge for "Fresh Off The Runway"	3 - 5
Allen Chen 陈祎伦	Tyson	Villain: Male supermodel; Rumoured to be in a relationship with Bingbing in the past; Womaniser; Scammed Zen two years ago; Resented by Bingbing; Attempted to take advantage of Vicky and the "Fresh Off The Runway" contestants; Fell into Vicky's trap; (Arrested - Episode 10)	7 - 10
Rayson Tan 陈泰铭	Ai Momo	Guest judge for "Fresh Off The Runway"; Installation master; Sensed the "smell of death" on Vicky shortly before she was attacked	10 - 11
Paige Chua 蔡琦慧	Nicole	Animal lover; Special guest for "Fresh Off The Runway"	5 - 7
Zoe Tay 郑惠玉	Zoe	Internationally renowned show choreographer; Guest judge for final round of "Fresh Off The Runway"	15 - 16

== Episodes ==
No.	Title
1	"Episode 1"
2	"Episode 2"
3	"Episode 3"
4	"Episode 4"
5	"Episode 5"
6	"Episode 6"
7	"Episode 7"
8	"Episode 8"
9	"Episode 9"
10	"Episode 10"
11	"Episode 11"
12	"Episode 12"
13	"Episode 13"
14	"Episode 14"
15	"Episode 15"
16	"Episode 16"

== Trivia ==
- Cheryl Chou, Shi Lim, Valnice Yek, Vanessa Peh, Joeypink Lai, Ling Ying and Sharlin Dian’s debut series.
- Carrie Wong’s second dual role after Against the Tide.

== Awards and nominations ==
VIC was nominated for 4 categories in Star Awards 2019.

=== Star Awards 2019 ===
Star Awards – Acting Awards
Accolades	Nominees	Category	Result
Star Awards 2019 Award Ceremony 红星大奖2019颁奖礼	Carrie Wong 黄思恬	Best Actress 最佳女主角	Nominated
Star Awards 2019 Award Ceremony 红星大奖2019颁奖礼	Watch Me by Ling Kai 铃凯	Best Theme Song 最佳主题曲	Nominated
Star Awards 2019 Award Ceremony 红星大奖2019颁奖礼	—N/a	Best Drama Serial 最佳电视剧	Nominated
Star Awards 2019 Creative Achievement Awards 红星大奖2019之专业奖项颁奖礼	Koh Siew Hui 高秀慧	Best Director 最佳导演	Nominated

== See also ==
- List of programmes broadcast by Mediacorp Channel 8
