= Miss Singapore 1958 =

Miss Malaya 1954, held on 28 June 1954

- Date: 27 June 1958
- Venue: Capitol Theatre, Singapore
- Director: Shaw Bros
- Entrants: 14
- Winner: Marion Faulkner Willis

Miss Singapore 1958, the first edition of Miss Universe Singapore pageant was held on 24 June 1958 at the Capitol Theatre, Singapore. Out of 32 applicants, it was then cut down to only 14 contestants to compete for the crown and title. A 19-year-old stenographer Marion Faulkner Willis won the title at the end of the event. She then had the rights to represent Singapore in the Miss Universe 1958 pageant in Long Beach, California, United States. She became the second woman to represent Singapore in the Miss Universe pageant after Marjorie Wee, of Malaya in 1954.

== Result ==
Final Results	Contestants
Miss Singapore 1958	Marion Willis
1st Runner-up	Christi D'Cruz
2nd Runner-up	Patricia Yong

== Contestants ==
1. Milly Koh
2. Doreen Blight
3. Daisy Szeto
4. Mary Wong
5. Patricia Yong
6. Leonie Koenits
7. Shirley Vanderput
8. Francis Foo
9. Alice Yong
10. Diana Hutchinson
11. Irene De Silva
12. Christi D'Cruz
13. Pauline Szeto
14. Marion Willis
