= Miss Universe Singapore =

Annual national beauty pageant competition in Singapore

Miss Universe Singapore Organization
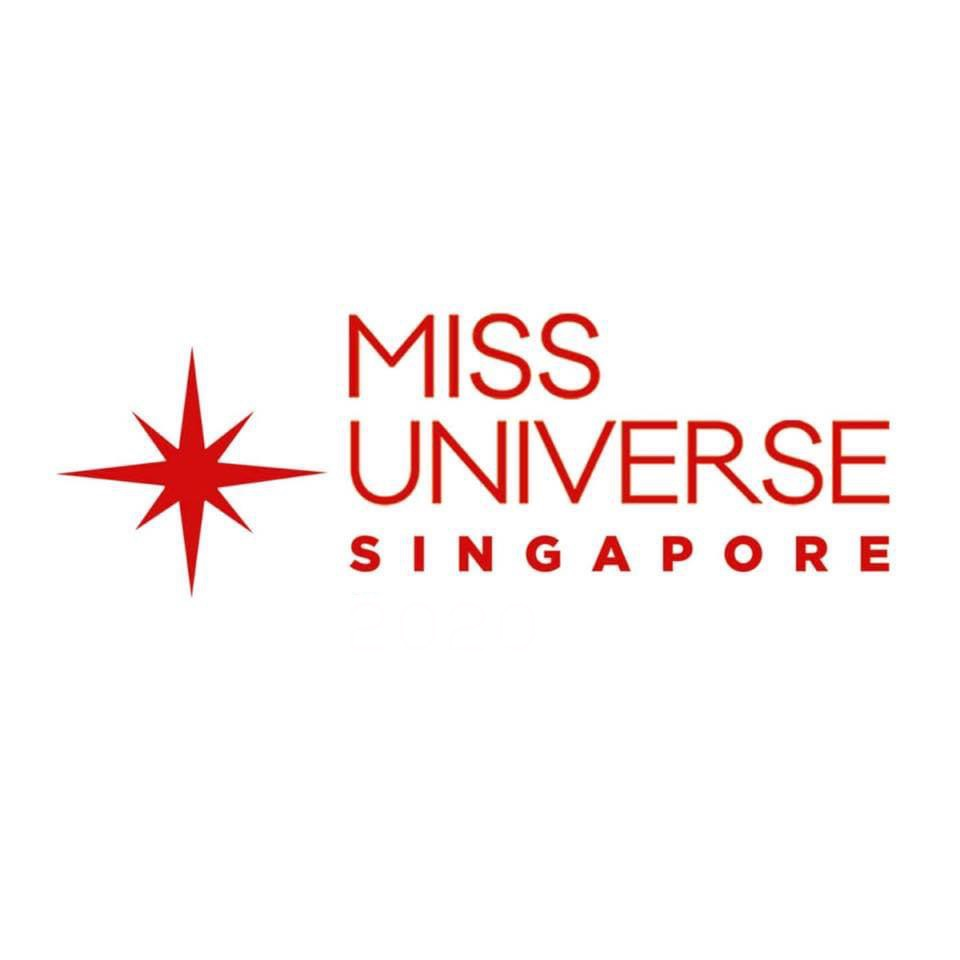
- Miss Universe Singapore Logo
- Formation: 1948; 78 years ago
- Type: Beauty pageant
- Headquarters: Singapore
- Location: Singapore
- Members: Miss Universe
- Official language: English
- Owner: Miss Grand International Public Company Limited
- President & National Director: Nawat Itsaragrisil
- Website: msunivese.sg

Miss Universe Singapore is a national Beauty pageant that selects the Singapore official representative to the Miss Universe pageant. Miss Universe Singapore 2026 is Vion Tan who was crowned on 13 October 2026.

== History ==
The Miss Singapore beauty pageant was held as early as 1941 and was organised by the Singapore Amateur Weightlifting Association Club.

Singapore has been sending representatives to Miss Universe contest as early as 1954. The title of the first Miss Singapore ever was won by Siti Mariam binti Ismail in 1951. Singapore has been represented at Miss Universe every year since 1966. The country had its first semi finalist when Kathie Lee Lee Beng secured the eighth position, the highest ever placement Singapore attained when the pageant was held in St. Louis in 1983. In 1987, when Singapore played host to the Miss Universe pageant, Marion Nicole Teo came in at the ninth place. After 34 years, Singapore secured a place again, with Nandita Banna being a semifinalist in the 70th edition of the Miss Universe pageant held in Port of Eilat, Israel.

Between 2001 and 2007, the contest was telecast 'live' by the local television station Mediacorp's Channel 5. Miss Universe Singapore Organisation holds the license to oversee and produce the Miss Universe Singapore pageant (2015). Prior to 2015, the contest was organised by Derrol Stepenny Promotions. Nuraliza Osman, the 2002 Miss Universe Singapore winner, took over the Miss Universe Singapore's licence and franchise in May 2015 from Derrol Stepenny Promotions. In April 2023, the Miss Universe Australia franchisee Tony and Sophia Barbagallo; of PinkTank Events acquired the Miss Universe Singapore license.

== Titleholders ==
The following is a list of all Miss Universe Singapore titleholders, and runners-up.

Year	Miss Universe Singapore	First Runner-up	Second Runner-up
2012	Lynn Tan	Nowreen Khan	Louissa Thomas
2013	Shi Lim	Cheryl Desiree Chan	Cordelia Low
2014	Rathi Menon	Arrian North	Ijechi Nazirah Nwaozuzu
2015	Lisa Marie White	No runners-up as she was appointed by the organization to compete at Miss Universe, no national pageant in 2015.	
2016	Cheryl Chou	Tanisha Lissa Khan	Sonya Elisabeth Branson
2017	Manuela Bruntraeger	Rudihra Ramathas	Emilbiany Nenggal Intong
2018	Zahra Khanum	Tiong Jiaen	Jaslyn Tan
2019	Mohana Prabha	Laranya Kumar	Cheryl Yao
2020	Bernadette Belle Ong	No runners-up as she was appointed by the organization to compete at Miss Universe due to the impact of COVID-19 pandemic, no national pageant in 2020.	
2021	Nandita Banna	Kalynskye Adrian	Lila Tan
2022	Carissa Yap	Yvonne Sashirekha	Denissia Delangle
2023	Priyanka Annuncia	Nikita Carters	Radhika Chandhok
2024	Charlotte Chia	Adelene Stanley	Olivia Dewi Cinta Higgins
2025	Annika Sager	Inez Chen	Alexis Kaur
2026	Vion Tan	Melissa Chua	Qatrisha Zairyah

== Titleholders under Miss Universe Singapore organisation ==
=== Miss Universe Singapore ===
Declared as Winner
Ended as runner-up or top 5/6 qualification
Ended as one of the finalists or semifinalists
Ended as special awards winner

On occasion, when the winner does not qualify (due to age) for either contest, a runner-up is sent.

Year	Miss Singapore	Placement at Miss Universe	Special Award(s)	Notes
1941	Ho Lye Toh			
1947	Ho Lye Toh			
1948	Ho Lye Toh			
1951	Mariani Binti Ismail	Did not compete		
1953	Latifah Omar	Did not compete		
1954	Marjorie Wee	Unplaced		She won Miss Malaya 1954 pageant but debuted at Miss Universe 1954 as Miss Singapore instead.
Shaw Brothers directorship — a franchise holder to Miss Universe 1958–1969
1958	Marion Willis	Unplaced		
Did not compete in 1959
1960	Christl d'Cruz	Did not compete		Competed in Miss International 1960.
1961	Julie Koh	Unplaced Miss Universe 1962		Withdrew from Miss International 1961 due to Hepatitis. competed in Miss Universe 1962.
1962	Nancy Liew	Did not compete		Competed in Miss International 1962.
1964	Vera Wee	Did not compete		She competed in Miss Universe Malaysia 1964 for Miss Universe 1964.
1965	Alice Woon Yoke Kwee	Did not compete		She competed in various pageants including national competition of Miss Malaysia for Miss World 1963 and Miss Malaysia for Miss Universe 1965.
1966	Margaret van Meel	Unplaced		
1967	Bridget Ong Mei-Lee	Unplaced		
1968	Yasmin Saif	Unplaced		
1969	Mavis Young Siew Kim	Unplaced		
Dr. Robert C K Loh directorship — a franchise holder to Miss Universe 1970–1992
1970	Cecilia Undasan	Unplaced		
1971	Jenny Ser Wang Wong	Unplaced		
1972	Jacqueline Han Ghim Hong	Unplaced		
1973	Debra Josephine de Souza	Unplaced		
1974	Angela Teo Bee Luang	Unplaced		
1975	Sally Tan	Unplaced		
1976	Linda Tham	Unplaced		
1977	Marilyn Sim Choon May	Unplaced		
1978	Annie Lee Mei Ling	Unplaced		
1979	Elaine Tan Kim Lian	Unplaced		
1980	Ann Chua Ai Choo	Unplaced		Rebranding as Miss Singapore Universe Organization.
1981	Florence Tan	Unplaced		
1982	Telma Judicia Mary Nonis	Unplaced		
1983	Kathie Lee Lee Beng	Top 12		
1984	Violet Lee Hui-Min	Unplaced		
1985	Lyana Chiok	Unplaced		
1986	Farah Lange	Unplaced		
1987	Marion Nicole Teo	Top 10		
1988	Audrey Ann Tay	Unplaced	Preliminary Swimsuit (4th Placed)	
1989	Pauline Chong	Unplaced		
1990	Ong Lay Ling	Unplaced		
1991	Eileen Yeow Yin Yin	Unplaced	Preliminary Swimsuit (9th Placed)	
1992	Cori Teo	Unplaced		
Metromedia Promotions Pte Ltd. directorship — a franchise holder to Miss Universe 1993–1999
1993	Rena Ramiah Devi	Unplaced		Rena won the Best Model of the Asia & Pacific 1994, fourth runner-up at Miss Tourism International 1994 (Sri-Lanka Edition) and Miss Tourism International (Turkey Edition).
1994	Paulyn Sun	Unplaced		
1995	Tun Neesa Abdullah	Unplaced		
1996	Angeline Putt	Unplaced		
1997	Tricia Tan Siew Siew	Unplaced		
1998	Alice Lim Poh Choo	Unplaced		
1999	Cheryl Marie Cordeiro	Unplaced		
Daryl Pang directorship — a franchise holder to Miss Universe 2000–2003
2000	Eunice Elizabeth Olsen	Unplaced		
2001	Jaime Teo	Unplaced		
2002	Nuraliza Osman	Unplaced		
2003	Bernice Wong Chea Mei	Unplaced		
Mediacorp directorship — a franchise holder to Miss Universe 2004–2008
2004	Sandy Chua Khang Ein	Unplaced		
2005	Cheryl Tay	Unplaced		
2006	Carol Cheong Yim Foon	Unplaced		
2007	Jessica Tan Yue Chang	Unplaced		
2008	Shenise Wong Yan Yi	Unplaced		
Errol Pang directorship — a franchise holder to Miss Universe 2009–2014
2009	Rachel Janice Kum	Unplaced		
2010	Tania Lim Kim Suan	Unplaced		
2011	Valerie Lim	Unplaced		
2012	Lynn Tan	Unplaced		
2013	Shi Lim	Unplaced		
2014	Rathi Menon	Unplaced		
Inès Ligron directorship — a franchise holder to Miss Universe in 2015
2015	Lisa Marie White	Unplaced		
Nuraliza Osman directorship — a franchise holder to Miss Universe 2016–2018
2016	Cheryl Chou	Unplaced		
2017	Manuela Bruntraeger	Unplaced		
2018	Zahra Khanum	Unplaced		
Valerie Lim directorship — a franchise holder to Miss Universe 2019–2022
2019	Mohana Prabha	Unplaced		
2020	Bernadette Ong	Unplaced		Appointed — Due to the impact of COVID-19 pandemic, no national pageant in 2020. Instead, a runner-up was appointed as the Miss Universe Singapore 2020 by the organization.
2021	Nandita Banna	Top 16		
2022	Carissa Yap	Unplaced		
Tony & Sophia Barbagallo (PinkTank Events) directorship — a franchise holder to Miss Universe in 2023
2023	Priyanka Annuncia	Unplaced	Voice For Change (Silver Winner)	
Elaine Daly directorship — a franchise holder to Miss Universe from 2024
2024	Charlotte Chia	Unplaced		
2025	Annika Sager	Unplaced		
2026	Vion Tan	Did not compete		

== See also ==
- Miss Singapore World
- Miss Singapore International
- Miss Earth Singapore
