= Lisa Marie White =

Singaporean model and beauty pageant titleholder

- Born: Lisa Marie White; 1992 or 1993 (age 33–34); Singapore
- Height: 173 cm (5 ft 8 in)
- Beauty pageant titleholder
- Title: Miss Singapore Universe 2015
- Hair color: Black
- Eye color: Brown
- Major competitions: Miss Singapore Universe 2015 (Winner); Miss Universe 2015 (Unplaced)

Lisa Marie White is a Singaporean model and beauty pageant titleholder who won the title of Miss Singapore Universe 2015 and represented Singapore at the Miss Universe 2015 pageant.

== Early life and education ==
White is born to a New Zealand father and a Singaporean mother, a speech and drama teacher. She was a student in Holy Innocents' High School from 2006 to 2009. She studied visual merchandising at Institute of Technical Education (ITE) College Central.

== Pageant career ==
On 19 September 2015 Lisa was crowned Miss Singapore Universe 2015 in Amber Lounge, Singapore. She was chosen in a closed-door recruitment and selection process.

As Miss Universe Singapore, Lisa represented Singapore at Miss Universe 2015 in Las Vegas, United States on 20 December 2015 but did not place.

== Acting career ==
After winning the pageant, Lisa went on to act in the Mediacorp television series Tanglin where she played a nurse called Elaine.

Awards and achievements
Preceded by Rathi Menon	Miss Singapore Universe; 2015	Succeeded by Cheryl Chou
