= Missing (Singaporean TV series) =

Singapore-Thailand thriller TV series

- Starring: Pierre Png; Rebecca Lim; Arak Amornsupasiri; Chontida Asavahame; Wiwid Bovornkiratikajorn; Thaneth Warakulnukroh
- Theme music composer: Brian You, Yongjun Kim
- Opening theme: I Miss You
- Countries of origin: Singapore; Thailand
- Original languages: English; Thai
- No. of episodes: 15

Production
- Producer: Wawa Pictures
- Production locations: Bangkok; Singapore
- Running time: approx. 45 minutes per episode

Original release
- Network: Mediacorp Channel 5
- Release: 12 February – 12 March 2018

Missing is an action thriller TV series. This is also the first collaboration between Singapore and Thailand.

It aired on Mediacorp Channel 5 every Mondays to Thursdays, 10:00pm to 11:00pm.

== Cast ==
=== Main cast ===
Cast	Role	Description
Pierre Png (Young Sean played by Brayden Koh) (Teenage Sean played by Ian Teng)	Sean Tan Koon Bing	Having been commissioned as an Inspector in the Singapore Police Force, Sean Tan works in the Criminal Investigation Department's Special Investigation Section and specialises in missing persons cases.He has schizophrenia however, after losing both his father and brother at a very young age. He also fears eating chicken, as it reminds him of how his brother was kidnapped. He is reported missing after Pakkapong betrays him and apparently sends him for an organ transplant.
Rebecca Lim (Young Lynn played by Jaylynn Lim)	Lynn Chao Swee Chin	A jaded, self-serving tour leader who makes Sean out to be a pervert and child kidnapper when they first meet, causing him to be arrested in Thailand, but gets together with him later and helps him to cope with his condition.
Arak Amornsupasiri	Aut	An Inspector in the Royal Thai Police and who is stationed at the Bangkok Min Buri Police Station, Aut meets Sean and Lynn in Thailand when they make a police report at the Bangkok Metropolitan Police Bureau over a missing child.
Chontida Asavahame	Hathai	Hathai is an aspiring singer in Thailand who performs at nightclubs and who tries to get together with Aut, but is rejected, and later comes to Singapore to further her career.

=== Guest appearances ===
Cast	Role	Description
Thaneth Warakulnukroh (Young Robert played by Nicholas Bloodworth)	Robert Chao Tze Tong	Robert is the long-lost father of Lynn, who was responsible for the murder of Peter Tan, Sean's father, and the kidnap of two missing children, one of whom was Sean's older brother. He ends up killing himself while he is being prepared for a liver transplant operation in Thailand.
Wiwid Bovornkiratikajorn (Teen Pakkapong played by Sirapat Aroon)	Pakkapong	Pakkapong is a powerful triad boss in Thailand, who later rapes Hathai and tries to take Lynn's life. He is later revealed to be Joel, William's son, who was kidnapped together with Sam, and is also promoted to being Damien's right-hand man.
Jay Kim	Damien	Damien is the head of The Eye, an international organ trafficking syndicate whose operations are mainly based in Thailand.

=== Supporting cast (Singapore) ===
Cast	Role	Description
Kishan J	Naveen	Naveen is Sean's close colleague in the Special Investigation Section and frequently assists him in cases. However, Sean and Naveen occasionally fight over cases, due to a difference in morals.
Ann Kok	Anne	Anne is the mother of Kelvin, and who indirectly caused Lynn to lose her job as a tour leader due to her insisting on staying in Thailand to find her son.
David Leong	James Loh	Inspector James Loh is another colleague of Sean in the Special Investigation Section but who is hated by Sean and Naveen, due to him being smug after taking over Peter Tan's case from Sean.
Timothy Nga (Young Sam played by Ayden Choong)	Sam Tan Koon Boon (hallucination)	Sam is the long-lost brother of Sean, who was kidnapped 30 years ago by Robert after he tried to save Joel from him, when Sean asked him to go out and buy a chicken drumstick for him. An adult Sam appears to Sean as a hallucination multiple times in the show.
David Loo	Mr Goh	Over the loss of his cat, Honey, Mr Goh approaches Lynn for help to find the cat.
Caryn Cheng	Dr Pow	Dr Pow is Lynn's best friend when they were in school, and is now a practising psychologist, who helps Sean through therapy sessions to improve his condition.
Wallace Ang	Peter Tan	Peter is the father of Sean and Sam, and the husband of Vivian, and who is later murdered by Robert when he overhears Somchai talking about them successfully kidnapping two boys six years ago. Peter became an alcoholic over the loss of Sam but never gave up on finding him. Sean hated him for supposedly being unfaithful to the family.
Jalyn Han (Young Vivian played by Ng Yulin)	Vivian Lee	Vivian Lee is the mother of Sean and Sam, and the wife of Peter, who later dies peacefully in her sleep. When she was young, she went insane over the loss of Sam and thought that Peter was having an extramarital affair with Karnda.
Zheng Wan Ling (Young Su played by Yap Hui Xin)	Su Chao	Su is the sister of Robert and Lynn's auntie, but who is more of a mother to Lynn. She also asks Lynn for help in finding Joanna, her daughter, when she goes missing.
Tay Ying	Joanna	The teenage cousin of Lynn who goes missing for a short period of time as a form of rebellion against her parents.
Craig Teo	Joe	The head librarian at the Crime Library in Singapore, and who offers Lynn a full-time job as a librarian at the Crime Library.
Henry Heng (Young William played by Larry Low)	William Tan	An uncle of Sean and the father of Joel, Sam and Sean's best friend, who was kidnapped 30 years ago. He approaches Damien for a chance to get a new liver through illegal means, and later assists Sean in stealing Damien's phone.
Ethan Ng	Joel Tan	The son of William Tan who was kidnapped by Robert 30 years ago, because his father had owed money to Somchai.
Michael Kwah	Andy	A child kidnapper who is arrested by Sean while he is on duty.

=== Supporting cast (Thailand) ===
Cast	Role	Description
Fangky Saraburi	Jarat	Jarat is someone Kelvin's father paid to assist him in the plot to regain custody of Kelvin while in Thailand, but who was killed later by Sean.
Siwapron Pengsree	Im	Im is the sister of Aut, and is also stationed at the Metropolitan Police Bureau in Thailand.
Pattaradis Sugiyama	Prin	
Varot Makaduangkeo	Jed	Jed is Aut's close colleague in the Bangkok Metropolitan Police Bureau and frequently assists him in cases. However, Jed is not as serious as Aut while on duty, and frequently causes Aut to be annoyed at him.
Tirapoj Tuansawad	Kelvin	Kelvin is the only son of Anne, who goes missing in Thailand while on a tour, as part of a plot by his father to regain custody of his son.
Atipa Ngamwajasat (Young Karnda played by Glory Ngim)	Karnda	Karnda is the sister of the Thai private investigator that Peter hired to find his missing son, Sam.
Narumon Somsri	Natcha	A lady who manages the bar that Hathai sings at in Thailand, and who persuaded Hathai to sing in Singapore.
Supachai Girdsuwan (Young Somchai played by Chakrit Thong Ek)	Somchai/Prapsochai	The man who colluded with Robert and criminals in Thailand to kidnap two boys in Singapore and bring them to Thailand. However, he is later arrested by two plainclothes policemen, and released six years later from prison. Afterwards, he becomes part of The Eye, being Pakkapong's right-hand man, under a new identity as Prapsochai.
Somboon Lapha	Satay Man	A man who sells satay and who is a subordinate of Somchai, who talks to Somchai after he is released from prison.

== Webisode ==
Besides the main episodes aired on Mediacorp Television, there are also webisodes that feature the same characters. Some webisodes follow the main story while some do not. The webisodes, if viewed on the Toggle website, can be viewed through a 360-degree view.

Webisode Number	Description	Publishing Date
1	Sean suspects the man that he bumped into at the park is his long lost brother Sam. He decides to follow and investigate in hopes of finding his brother.	14 Feb 2018
2	Sean is on a stakeout. He casually glances at a picture of a man, Andy, on his phone and puts it away. Not long after, Andy appears and begins to tail a young schoolboy. Sean calmly follows.	14 Feb 2018
3	A Thai man receives a phone call and a picture with instructions to kidnap their mark – Lynn.	26 Feb 2018
4	Two plainclothes policemen chase young Somchai. They finally capture him and, after a brief tussle, subdue him. However, the webisode also shows again what happened to Sam and Uncle William's son, Joel, when they were being kidnapped by Robert in greater detail.	28 Feb 2018
5	Six years later after the kidnapping of Sam and Joel, Young Robert was on his way home when he felt someone was following him. Then, young Somchai suddenly appears before him – he's finally been released from prison.	28 Feb 2018
6	Young Somchai and young Robert were about to leave Golden Mile for the pier for smuggling. Peter comes running and finds them. Robert ends up killing Peter.	28 Feb 2018
7	After finding out that her father is not dead and is also the man responsible for Sam's disappearance, Lynn was feeling down and walked to the park. It so happened that young Robert also brought her to this park when Lynn was young.	1 Mar 2018
8	Young Robert received a call from Aunt Su that Singapore police is looking for him. Young Robert is stressed out over having murdered Peter.	6 Mar 2018

== Plot ==
Thirty years ago, Sean's brother, Sam, went missing. Having since worked his way up and been commissioned as an Inspector in the CID's Special Investigation Section, Sean gained access to narrow down his search to Bangkok, Thailand in hope of reuniting with his long - lost brother. On one such trip, Sean encounters Lynn, a jaded, self - serving tour leader who makes him out to be a pervert and child kidnapper, and gets him arrested. There they meet Aut, a high - flying, hot - shot Thai Inspector who seems to care more about his image than police work and, at the same time, is suspiciously familiar with the local gangs. Thus their lives collided and become intertwined, and what started as one man's search for his brother, quickly turns into a dangerous foray into the underbelly of an international human trafficking syndicate.

== Trivia ==
- This is Ann Kok's first English drama series in over 25 years.

== Synopsis ==
Episode Number	Description	Date Aired
1`	A 12-year - old boy, Kelvin, goes missing from a tour group and the tour guide, Lynn, is forced to help search for him. She meets Sean, an officer of the Special Investigations Section (SIS) branch of the CID in Singapore, who is also in Bangkok conducting his own missing person's search. Their collective path's cross with Aut, a high - flying Thai police officer, when Lynn fingers Sean as a kidnapper and gets him arrested.	12 Feb 2018
2	The relationship dynamics between Sean, Lynn and Aut changes drastically when the truth behind Aut's previous actions come to light, and their combined efforts to find Kelvin intensifies. The path to finding the truth isn't going to be an easy one, and very well might cost Kelvin his life.	13 Feb 2018
3	Lynn flies back to Singapore to find herself looking for yet another missing person, her teenage cousin Joanna who has suddenly disappeared. Lynn tries to get Sean to help her but their friendship turns sour when he makes things worse for her instead. Turning to the Crime Library for help, Lynn finds out more about missing cases. She realises that Sean's family is involved in the most famous and mysterious missing person case in Singapore.	14 Feb 2018
4	Sean is tasked to identify the remains of a skeleton that was buried thirty years ago. As the list of possibilities slowly narrows, Sean is forced to face the fact that what he believed about his father may not be the truth after all. Promises of wealth and fame lure Hathai to Singapore and she's excited about her future. Not long after she arrives however, Hathai realises she is supposed to offer services that she had never signed up for in her contract.	19 Feb 2018
5	After having autopsy reports confirm the death of his father, Sean moves on to find the person who killed him. Meanwhile, feeling great remorse for ignoring Hathai, Aut flies to Singapore in a desperate, blind search of her, unaware of just how much danger she's really in. With both men being stonewalled in their respective searches, the abrasive duo have no choice but to rely on each other in order to further their personal goals.	20 Feb 2018
6	Sean and Aut manage to rescue Lynn and Hathai from Pakkapong's clutches, but not before Hathai suffered the most horrendous violation. Both men are wracked with guilt at having failed to adequately protect their respective charges, and begin to find support and understanding in each other. Hathai begins to distance herself from Aut, Sean and Lynn's relationship begins to grow.	22 Feb 2018
7	After much searching, Aut has finally managed to track down Karnda, and Sean rushes down to Bangkok to meet her. From her, he learns a great deal about the circumstances surrounding his father's disappearance. Meanwhile, Lynn constantly second - guesses herself as to how she should approach her budding relationship with Sean, even as her Aunt Su for reasons unknown, actively tries to discourage her.	26 Feb 2018
8	Sean immediately regrets his decision to tell Lynn about Sam. Just as he feared, Lynn struggles to accept Sean's confession. In the meantime, Aut gets a breakthrough in Hathai's rape case. As the main witness in the rape case, Lynn's life is in danger as she prepares to identify the rapist. Once again, she is saved by the mysterious man and he finally reveals his real identity.	27 Feb 2018
9	Lynn confronts the mysterious man and ends up with more questions than answers. Aunt Su continues to insist she knows nothing about what really happened to Lynn's father. Lynn has no choice but to find out the truth herself. A very different Hathai turns up at the police station declaring that she wants all charges against Pakkapong dropped immediately.	28 Feb 2018
10	Aunt Su cannot hold Lynn off any longer and tells Robert the inevitable is about to happen. When Robert finds out Sean is the brother of one of the missing boys, he is more determined to break up his daughter's relationship with Sean. In the meantime, just as things for Sean are looking up, Rosli presents him with new, disturbing evidence about his father's death.	1 Mar 2018
11	Affected by the shocking discoveries, Lynn falls out completely with Aunt Su. Sean's mental health is a cause of concern, and this results in his suspension from the police force. Lynn on the other hand, suspects that Aunt Su leaked out Sean's condition. Back in Thailand, Aut gets a new case of dead solo traveler with missing organs. This case leads the Thai police to a major crime syndicate, The Eye.	5 Mar 2018
12	Lynn persuades her father Robert to search for Sean's missing brother. In doing so, Robert is forced to confront with his old demons and Lynn begins to feel pangs of empathy for her father. William meets with Damien Paulo, a suave businessman who promises him a new kidney. Lynn finds out about William's dealings, and through Aut, informs Sean, bringing them all ever closer to unravelling the mystery of the trafficking syndicate, The Eye.	6 Mar 2018
13	Lynn couldn't stop Sean from finding out the dark connection between their fathers, and their already strained relationship is further tested. Pakkapong once again displays his ruthlessness when he cuts a deal with Damien to carry on their trafficking despite Sirichai's orders to lie low. Fulfilling his promise to Lynn, Robert finally discovers Sam's identity, but he paid the ultimate price to atone for all the sins he committed decades ago.	7 Mar 2018
14	Pakkapong kidnaps Lynn, and offers her life in exchange for information that Sean has gathered on The Eye. Sean has no choice but to accede to Pakkapong's demands, even though he knows he's likely walking into a trap. Buying himself more insurance, he forces Hathai to kill Aut. And when the time comes for the exchange to be made, Lynn, in the hopes of saving Sean's life, reveals to them the most shocking of secrets!	8 Mar 2018
15	Sean now has to contend with Pakkapong's checkered past, shunning Aut's advice, he chooses to help his brother and together, the siblings hatch a plan to bring Sirichai down while, at the same time, removing all traces of Pakkapong's involvement with The Eye. Just as Sean is ready to put the past behind him and settle into a new and peaceful life, one final twist will shatter that hope and leave him clinging on for dear life.	12 Mar 2018
