= Nuraliza Osman =

Singaporean lawyer and beauty queen (born 1977)

- Born: Nuraliza Osman; Singapore
- Height: 170 cm (5 ft 7 in)
- Beauty pageant titleholder
- Title: Miss Singapore Universe 2002
- Hair color: Black
- Eye color: Brown
- Major competitions: Miss Singapore Universe 2002 (Winner); Miss Universe 2002 (Unplaced)

Nuraliza Osman (born 1977) is a Singaporean lawyer and beauty pageant titleholder who was crowned Miss Singapore Universe 2002 and represented her country at Miss Universe 2002 in Bayamón, Puerto Rico. Known affectionately as "Nura", she is of Dutch, Chinese, Indian and Indonesian descent.

== Biography ==
Nuraliza Osman grew up in Singapore and was a top student and scholar at the Methodist Girls School where she won many accolades and excelled academically. She then attended Victoria Junior College where she studied pre-medicine classes and French.

Osman studied law at the National University of Singapore and in the United States.

Osman joined the Miss Singapore Universe 2002 pageant and won the title and the right to represent Singapore at the Miss Universe 2002 pageant in Puerto Rico. She is the only Malay delegate who represented Singapore in recent times.

Osman was active in television from 2003. She was awarded the Best Newcomer actress in 2004 and hosted the first Malay women's talk show in 2017.

After her reign as Miss Singapore Universe, she continued her law studies in New York and returned to Singapore thereafter to pursue her career in law as a civil litigator for the leading law firm of Rajah and Tann. She was nominated Young Lawyer of the Year by the Law Society of Singapore and has remained a successful lawyer to date.

In 2012, she represented Singapore as an athlete in freediving where she set a record for her country in a depth discipline.

She speaks English, Malay, Bahasa Indonesia, French, German, Dutch, and Spanish.
