= Violet Sleigh =

Singaporean beauty queen

- Born: Violet Maria Sleigh; 1935 (age 90–91); Singapore
- Years active: 1953–1956
- Title: Miss Max Factor Malaya 1953
- Successor: Marjorie Wee
- Spouse: Cecil Bombell (m. 1957)
- Children: 4
- Parents: Hannah Elias (Mother); Henry Montague Holland Sleigh (Father)
- Relatives: Stella Sleigh (Sister); Iris Sleigh (Sister); Grace Sleigh (Sister); Joyce Sleigh (Sister); Helen Sleigh (Sister); Arthur William Sleigh (Half-brother); Harry Sleigh (Half-brother)
- Awards: Miss Max Factor Malaya 1953 (Winner); Miss Malaya 1954 (1st Runner-up)

Violet Maria Bombell (née Sleigh) (born 1935), became Miss Malaya when she was crowned "Miss Max Factor of Malaya" in 1953. She also won the second place in the Miss Malaya 1954 pageant in Singapore.

== Early life ==
Family

Violet Maria Sleigh was born in Singapore in 1935 to a Malay mother, Hannah Elias, and an Australian father, Henry Montague Holland Sleigh. Henry Sleigh was a well-known horse trainer in Malaya, before and after the Second World War. He and Hannah Elias had five daughters: Stella (b. 13 July 1930), Iris (b. 10 October 1931), Grace (b. 25 May 1933), Violet and Joyce (b. 1934).

After her parents divorced, Sleigh's mother married an Indonesian actor and band leader, Mohammad Yatim, also known as "Maroeti'.

Sleigh has an older half-sister and a half-brother, 'Bluey' Arthur William Sleigh (b. 1902), from her father's first marriage to Ada McCabe. She also has a younger half brother, Harry Sleigh, from her father's third marriage.

Fall of Singapore

Sleigh's older sisters, Stella, Iris and Grace were killed in 1942 as they fled the imminent Japanese invasion. Fearing for the safety of his daughters, Harry Sleigh bought four tickets to put his daughters on the evacuation ship, 'S.S. Kuala', that was bound to Australia. The three girls are presumed to have died during the sinking of the ship after it was hit by Japanese bombers off Pom Pom Island. Sleigh was also to board the 'S.S. Kuala' with her older sisters but "clung to her father in tears and terror and refused to leave". A jockey's girlfriend who was with them, Jessie Lee, took Sleigh's place after she offered to care for the girls. Henry Sleigh thought his three daughters were safe in Australia and did not learn of the sinking of the 'S.S. Kuala' until after the war. Sleigh recalled during a 2016 radio interview that her parents walked to the Raffles Hotel to see the list of the survivors. When they did not see the names of their daughters, her parents sat and cried.

Internment at Changi Prison Camp

After the fall of Singapore to the Japanese, Sleigh's mother took her younger sister Joyce with her to Kuala Lumpur, whilst Violet remained with her father in Singapore.

The Sleigh family were considered by the Japanese to be enemy civilians because of their Australian nationality. Sleigh was interned at the infamous Changi Civilian internment Camp along with her father, older half-brother and step-mother. Sleigh's younger half-brother, Harry, was born at the camp on 26 July 1942. The women and children were segregated from the men, and were eventually allowed to meet occasionally. Drawings of "Bluey" and "Pop" Sleigh by fellow internee, William Haxworth. The sketches show how they were reduced to skin and bones as a result of their internment.

This is the listing for the Sleigh family as recorded in the Civilian Internees Database maintained by the Changi Museum.

	Surname	First Name	Nationality	Date of birth	Gender	Profession	Camp	ID
1	Sleigh	Henry	Australian	1880	M	Horse Trainer	Changi	4649
2	Sleigh	Arthur William	Australian	1902	M	Horse Trainer	Changi	4646
3	Sleigh	Helen	Australian	1922	F	Housewife	Changi	4648
4	Sleigh	Violet	Australian	1936	F	Child	Changi	4650
5	Sleigh	Harry	Australian	26.07.42	M	Infant	Changi	4647

Sleigh said of her time at Changi:

It was terrible because I had a step-mother and she was very cruel to me... Then she was pregnant with my little brother (Harry). I loved him so much. He was my little doll. She would feed him and she'd say, "You look after him. You take him out." He was forever on my hips and forever in my arms.

It was tough because we kids, even though there was hundreds of us there, we didn't have any food to eat. We played happily... And when the food came around, it was just a bowl of rice. So we ate and whatever was left, they'll say, "All right, this time you can go in." And we were all diving into–it used to be big wooden tubs with rice. The rice used to fall on the floor and we used to try get the sand off it and we ate it. So rice is very precious to me and I love it.

If I have any rice over, I don't throw it in the rubbish bin I give it to the birds. Because it is a sin to throw rice away. And I taught it to all my girls, "Don't throw bread. Don't throw anything that the birds or the ants can eat. You give it to them."

But I tell you what, the older girls, they suffered. ... They had periods, and the guards were always there. They had one tap where you had to shower under the eyes of the Japanese which was very hard for them, with sarongs around them. I think the older people did suffer a bit more. We suffered also but we didn't understand it as much. We just played happily. The Japanese used to come every so often and give us lollies. We'd think, "Oh, well, we'll just say hello to them." But you had to bow to the morning sun, and if you didn't bow low enough they were willing to get the sword out and give you a whack. So they were cruel to the older people.

The Japanese surrender was officially announced on 15 August 1945, but it was another two weeks before the internees saw Allied planes. Sleigh witnessed the drop of six British soldiers by parachute into the camp on 30 August 2015.

I remember I was in the garden, I had my brother (Harry) with me. There was like parachutes flying down, and I'm looking and I'm thinking, "What is this?" There were beautiful, young troopers coming in. I was just that excited–we had barbed wire around–I pulled the barbed wire open. It caught my leg. I still got a scar there. I ran into their arms. And they were calling out, "Yea! The war is over." "What war? We didn't–good!" We're no longer prisoners. They gave us lollies and chewing gum and things like that. They just took us up in their arms and they were just marvellous. The most amazing part is that we were free again. We weren't sort of restricted into what time you woke up and whether there was any food around. We could get food. It was lovely. And we walked. A lot of people walked out of the prison and kept walking.

After the Liberation of Singapore

After the war, Sleigh's father moved to Kuala Lumpur. Sleigh's mother wanted her to remain in Singapore and live with her. She and her sister, Joyce, would entertain the troops by doing the hula dance while their step-father played music. Sleigh attended the Holy Infant Jesus Convent School in Singapore until she was fourteen years old, when she chose to move to Kuala Lumpur to live with her father. Sleigh says she did not feel much difference in living Kuala Lumpur because her mother "brought them up in the Malay way"

== Beauty pageant ==
Sleigh became Miss Malaya when she won the Miss Max Factor Malaya title in the year 1953, beating over 47 contestants across Malaya and Singapore. A scout for the beauty pageant approached Sleigh at Robinson's Department Store in Singapore where she worked as a dressmaker and occasional model. Sleigh also competed in the Miss Malaya 1954 pageant held at the Capitol Theatre, Singapore and ended up being the 1st Runner-up while the Miss Singapore herself, Rugayah binti Ibrahim won the third place. The winner, Marjorie Wee of Malaya had the rights to represent Singapore in Miss Universe 1954.

Her prizes included "$1,000 in cash, a brand new wardrobe, a trip to Hollywood and two weeks stay at the Hollywood Roosevelt Hotel. Arriving in December, Sleigh had the opportunity to meet many of the major Hollywood stars who were out of the city. She also had the opportunity to meet Dean Martin, Jerry Lewis, Zsa Zsa Gabor and the owner of Max Factor company itself, Mr. Francis Factor. About her meeting of Zsa Zsa Gabor, Sleigh said, "Oh she was a right… Not a nice person, really."

Whilst in Hollywood, Sleigh did a reading at Columbia Pictures. It was also reported that a film director, Michael Curtiz, approached her to take a screen for The Egyptian but she refused.

== Personal life ==
On 17 August 1957, Sleigh married an Australian advertising executive, Cecil Fay Bombell and then she had to move to Australia, where she had four daughters. Her husband was a half-Australian and a half-Italian.

Sleigh returned to Malaysia twice. She described her first journey home in the 1970s as a "sentimental journey" home. She wanted to find her half-brother, Harry, whom she had lost contact with, and to also find her father's grave. Her father had died in the 1960s in Malaysia. Her second trip to Malaysia in 2015 was a gift from her daughters on the occasion of her 80th birthday.
