= Bernadette Ong =

Singaporean beauty pageant titleholder

Bernadette Belle Ong
- Born: Bernadette Belle Wu Ong; 1993 or 1994 (age 31–32); Philippines
- Height: 1.70 m (5 ft 7 in)
- Beauty pageant titleholder
- Title: Miss Universe Singapore 2020
- Hair color: Black
- Eye color: Brown
- Major competitions: Miss Charm Singapore 2019 (Winner); Miss Universe Singapore 2020 (Appointed); Miss Universe 2020 (Unplaced)

Bernadette Belle Wu Ong is a Singaporean actress, emcee, model, and beauty pageant titleholder who was appointed as Miss Universe Singapore 2020. She represented Singapore at Miss Universe 2020.

== Personal life ==
Ong was born and raised in the Philippines to Chinese parents. Her family moved to Singapore when she was 10 and later on, she studied in Australia.

== Pageantry ==
Ong competed in the Miss Universe Singapore in 2019. She also won the title Miss Charm Singapore 2019 and later represented Singapore in Miss Charm International 2019. She was handpicked to compete at Miss Universe 2020, which was delayed due to the COVID-19 pandemic and was held on 16 May 2021.

Awards and achievements
Preceded by Mohana Prabha	Miss Universe Singapore; 2020	Succeeded by Nandita Banna
