= Shero (TV series) =

2023 Singaporean television series

- Promotional banner
- Genre: Drama; Action
- Screenplay by: Zhang Jingyu
- Story by: Lim Gim Lan; Wu Cuicui
- Directed by: Chen Yiyou
- Starring: Joanne Peh; Romeo Tan; Carrie Wong; Nick Teo
- Opening theme: "Awaken" by Shirlyn Tan
- Ending theme: 1) "If" by Tay Kewei; 2) "Why Don't You Let Go" by Tay Kewei; 3) "Sleepless N1tes" by xxmxrcs; 4) "Best Mistake" by Timmy Albert; 5) "Fade Away" by Narysal
- Country of origin: Singapore
- Original language: Mandarin
- No. of seasons: 1
- No. of episodes: 20

Production
- Executive producer: Leong Lye Lin
- Cinematography: Hong Shunmei; Zheng Qingshan
- Editors: Chen Jinyao; Pan Yaodong
- Running time: 45 minutes
- Production company: Mediacorp

Original release
- Network: Channel 8
- Release: 12 June – 7 July 2023

Shero (stylized in all uppercase) is a 2023 Singaporean action drama series starring Joanne Peh, Romeo Tan, Carrie Wong and Nick Teo. It follows the story of a woman who decides to join her missing sister's bodyguard company to search for her parents' murderer and to continue her sister's legacy. It began airing on Mediacorp Channel 8 from 12 June 2023.

== Cast ==
=== Main and supporting ===
- Joanne Peh as Zhang Yinchen
- Romeo Tan as Yue Ruixiang / Max
- Carrie Wong as Zhang Yinxi
- Nick Teo as Guan Junsheng
- Aileen Tan as Chen Meihua
- Rayson Tan as Yue Feihong
- Brandon Wong as Yang Huabiao
- Priscelia Chan as Jiang Meizhen
- Tay Ying as Lin Xinya
- Cheryl Chou as Zhou Jingyu
- Grace Teo as Zhao Zihan
- Brian Ng as Code
- Daryl-Ann as Chen Weiting
- Zhu Xiufeng as Chen Yalian
- Angela Ang as Liu Ruoling
- Jack Hyde as Officer Hayden

=== Cameo appearances ===
- Regene Lim as Han Shasha
- Joyce Ng as Chloe Lam
- Darren Lim as Dai Guowei
- Cynthia Koh as Gina Chee
- Chen Shucheng as Huang Yudai
- Wu Kaishen as Yudai's elder son
- Benjamin Tan as Joel Seah
- Bernard Tan as Zhang Tianyou
- Zhu Zeliang as News anchor
- Evelyn Tan Qijia as News anchor
- Ann Poh as Australian nurse

== Awards and nominations ==
Accolades	Category	Nominees	Result
Star Awards 2024	Best Drama Serial	—N/a	Nominated
Star Awards 2024	Best Theme Song	Ling Kai and Shirlyn Tan	Nominated
Star Awards 2024	Best Supporting Actress	Aileen Tan	Won
Star Awards 2024	Best Supporting Actor	Darren Lim	Nominated
Star Awards 2024	Best Actress	Joanne Peh	Nominated

== Production ==
Principal photography began in December 2022. The production crew of 27, which includes cast members Joanne Peh, Romeo Tan, Carrie Wong, Nick Teo and Tay Ying, travelled to Canberra, Australia for filming on 21 February 2023. Aileen Tan joined the cast in Canberra on 28 February 2023. On 27 February 2023, scenes involving Joanne Peh and Romeo Tan were shot at Pialligo Estate. Local media in Canberra reported that the production crew spent 10 days, from 22 February to 4 March, filming at various locations in the capital city including the airport, Cockington Green and Jamala Wildlife Park. Shero is also reportedly the largest overseas filming crew to ever shoot in Canberra.
