= Silent Walls =

- Promotional poster
- 密宅
- Genre: Thriller; Drama
- Screenplay by: Kate Feng Yi-en
- Story by: Nurel Anwar
- Directed by: Rowena Loh, Wong Kuang Yong
- Starring: 1938: Tasha Low; Ayden Sng; Mindee Ong; Tay Ying; Charlie Goh; 1963: Foo Fang Rong; Shane Pow; Ferlyn Wong; 1988: Macy Chen; Alfred Sng; Desmond Shen; Desmond Ng; 2023: Jojo Goh; Andie Chen; Bernard Tan; Chen Shucheng
- Country of origin: Singapore
- Original language: Mandarin
- No. of episodes: 20

Production
- Executive producers: Jean Yeo; Pedro Tan; Rowena Loh
- Production company: Ochre Pictures

Original release
- Network: Mediacorp Channel 8
- Release: 15 March – 11 April 2023

Silent Walls (Chinese: 密宅) is a 2023 Singaporean thriller television series telecast on Mediacorp Channel 8 and produced by Ochre Pictures. It stars Tasha Low, Ayden Sng, Mindee Ong, Tay Ying, Charlie Goh, Foo Fang Rong, Shane Pow, Ferlyn Wong, Macy Chen, Alfred Sng, Desmond Shen, Desmond Ng, Jojo Goh, Andie Chen, Bernard Tan and Chen Shucheng. The series centres around a mansion and the lives of its occupants in 1938, 1963, 1988 and 2023.

== Cast ==
=== 1938 ===
- Tasha Low
- Ayden Sng
- Mindee Ong
- Tay Ying
- Charlie Goh
- Darren Lim
- Lina Ng
- Alfred Ong

=== 1963 ===
- Foo Fang Rong
- Shane Pow
- Ferlyn Wong
- Constance Song
- Tracer Wong

=== 1988 ===
- Mei Xin
- Alfred Sng
- Desmond Shen
- Desmond Ng

=== 2023 ===
- Jojo Goh
- Andie Chen
- Chen Shucheng
- Eelyn Kok
- Angela Ang
- Cheryl Chou
- Zhang Xinxiang
- Chen Huihui

== Controversy ==
The 1988 storyline features a gay relationship between Kai De (played by Alfred Sun) and his much older dance instructor boyfriend Nigel (played by Adam Chen). Nigel eventually dies from an unspecified sexually transmitted disease, which is heavily implied to be AIDs.

Silent Walls was criticised by the LGBT community in Singapore for perpetuating harmful gay stereotypes. Most notable, LGBT media platform Dear Straight People condemned the storyline for perpetuating the notion that gay men are predators and have sexually transmitted diseases.

In response to the criticism, Mediacorp Channel 8 issued a statement insisting that 'they didn't set out to perpetuate any stereotypes'.

== Accolades ==
Ceremony	Year	Category	Nominees	Result	Ref.
Asian Academy Creative Awards	2023	Best Promo or Trailer (national winner - Singapore)	Silent Walls trailer	Won	
Asian Academy Creative Awards	2023	Best Single Drama / Telemovie / Anthology Episode	Silent Walls – 2023	Won	
ContentAsia Awards	2023	Best Asian Feature Film/Telemovie	Silent Walls – 2023 Telemovie	Nominated	
ContentAsia Awards	2023	Best Asian Feature Film/Telemovie	Silent Walls – 1938 Telemovie	Nominated	
Star Awards	2024	Best Director	Rowena Loh	Nominated	
Star Awards	2024	Best Screenplay	Kate Feng and Rowena Loh	Nominated	
Star Awards	2024	Best Actor	Andie Chen	Nominated	
