= Rathi Menon =

Singaporean model (born 1991)

- Born: Rathi Menon; September 13, 1991 (age 35); Singapore
- Height: 1.72 m (5 ft 8 in)
- Beauty pageant titleholder
- Title: Miss Singapore Universe 2014
- Hair color: Black
- Eye color: Brown
- Major competitions: Miss Singapore Universe 2014 (Winner); Miss Universe 2014 (Unplaced)

Rathi Menon (September 13, 1991) is a Singaporean model and beauty pageant titleholder who won the title of Miss Singapore Universe 2014 and represented her country at the Miss Universe 2014 pageant. Menon is a pharmacy technician of Indian descent.

== Miss Singapore Universe 2014 ==
Rathi was crowned Miss Singapore Universe 2014 on 22 August 2014 at the finals held at Shangri-La Hotel, beating 11 other finalists. She also bagged the accolades for Miss Brilliance and Miss Personality.

She is also the first Singaporean woman of Indian descent to win this title since 1998.

== Miss Universe 2014 ==
Menon competed at the Miss Universe 2014 pageant but was unplaced.

Awards and achievements
Preceded by Shi Lim	Miss Singapore Universe; 2014	Succeeded by Lisa Marie White
