= Alfred Sun =

Singaporean actor, model, singer

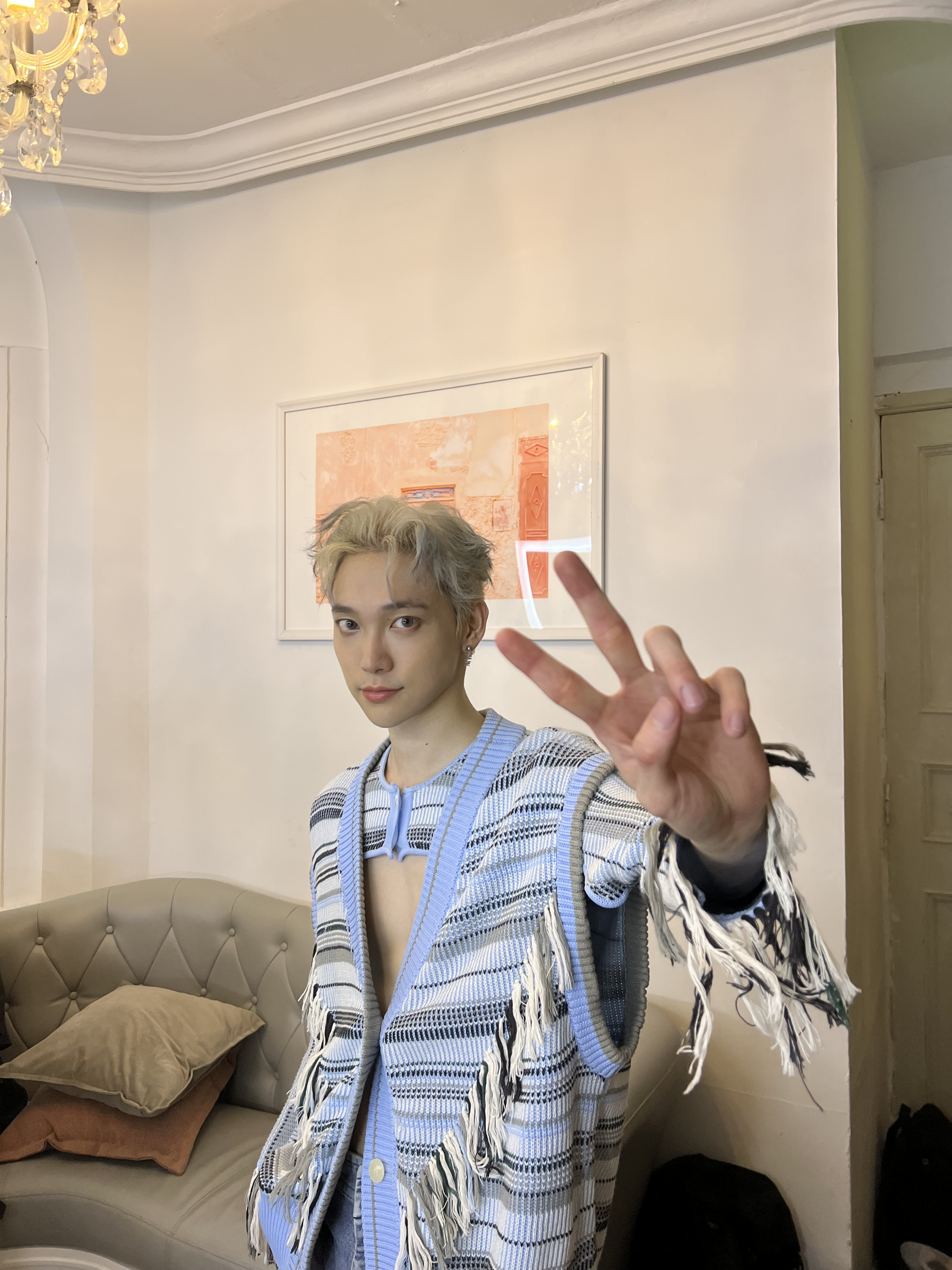
- Alfred Sun in 2023
- Born: Alfred Sng Eng How; 16 November 1991 (age 34); Singapore
- Other names: Sealfred; 小英; 白兔
- Education: Nanyang Academy of Fine Arts
- Occupations: Actor; singer; songwriter; model; dancer
- Agent: Independent

Chinese name
- Traditional Chinese: 孫英豪
- Simplified Chinese: 孙英豪
- Hanyu Pinyin: Sūn Yīngháo
- Wade–Giles: Sun Yinghao

Alfred Sun (born Alfred Sng Eng How on 16 November 1991) is a Singaporean male singer, actor, and model. He is known for his participation in singing competitions such as The Voice, Jungle voice (声林之王), as well as his appearances on the Chinese idol survival reality show We Are Young (少年之名), along with acting roles in the LINE TV web drama HIStory3-那一天 and the short film Summerdaze.

== Early life and career ==
Sun graduated with a Bachelor of Arts (Hons) Graphic Communication from Nanyang Academy of Fine Arts in 2016.

In 2010, Sun and his friends participated in an audition co-sponsored by JYP and Alpha Asean Region Audition, which was held in 2010 by Alpha Entertainment. Sun was the only male contracted trainee, alongside fellow Singaporeans Tahsa Low and Elaine Wong. Due to National Service in Singapore, he was unable to debut in South Korea but went on to pursue a solo career in music, acting and modeling.

In 2017, Sun partnered with Zhang Minhua to form a group and participated in the Malaysia-Singapore singing program The Voice. He achieved a top-four ranking in the Dingdang team.

In 2018, he participated in the first season of Jungle voice (声林之王) and was eliminated in the fifth episode. During the same year, he starred in the short film Summerdaze alongside David Eung, directed by Martin Hong. Sun's portrayal of Kai in this production showcased his acting skills and versatility as a performer.

In 2019, Sun played the role of Xiao Ying in the LINE TV web drama HIStory3-那一天. In 2020, Sun participated in the Chinese male group reality competition show We Are Young. Out of 84 participants, including fellow Singaporean Huang Junrong, Sun left the show after being placed 30th.

In 2022, Sun released his single "Vampire" and in 2023, his debut music album Eyes on Me in 2023.

== Discography ==
=== Singles ===
Year	Title	Notes	Ref
2022	"Vampire" 重生		
2022	"Something, Alright"	Performed with David Eung, Summerdaze OST	
2023	"Dancing With The Moon"	English and Chinese version	
2024	"BLOOM"		

=== Studio albums ===
Year	Title	Notes	Ref
2023	Eyes On Me		

== Filmography ==
=== Film ===
Year	Title	Role	Notes	Ref.
2017	Unbroken: 不倒翁	光 / Guang	Short Film	
2018	Shelter	Aaron	Short Film	
2018	Summerdaze	Kai	Short Film	
2021	Summerdaze: The Series	Kai		
2023	Summerdaze: Christmas Together	Kai	Short Film	

=== Television ===
Year	Title	Role	Notes	Ref.
2019	HIStory3: 那一天	小英 / Xiao Ying	Web drama	
2020	致2020的我们		Cameo	
2023	Silent Walls	金凯德/ Jin Kai De	Television series	

=== MV and cameo appearance ===
Year	Singer	Title	Role	Ref
2017	Matthew Quek 郭光正	Unbroken: 不倒翁	Actor	
2018	Estelle Fly	Blue (feat. Soleil Soleil)	Actor	
2019	The Sam Willows	Keep Me Jealous	Dancer	

=== Music competitions ===
Year	Competitions	Stage location	Result	Ref
2017	The Voice	Malaysia	Semi-finalist	
2019	Jungle Voice 声林之王	Taiwan		
2020	We Are Young	China	Top 30 finalist	

== Awards and nominations ==
Year	Organisation	Category	Nominated work	Result	Ref
2024	Star Awards	Top 10 Most Popular Male Artistes	—N/a	Nominated	
