= Lila Tan =

Singaporean footballer (born 2003)

Personal information
- Full name: Lila Tan Hui Ying
- Date of birth: 4 June 2003 (age 23)
- Place of birth: Singapore
- Height: 1.73 m (5 ft 8 in)
- Position: Midfielder

Team information
- Current team: Still Aerion WFC
- Number: 3

Youth career
- -2020: AKSIL FC

Senior career*
Years	Team	Apps	(Gls)
2022–2023	Lion City Sailors		
2024	Albirex Niigata (S)		(5)
2025-2026	Still Aerion WFC		(7)
2026	Manningham United Blues		

International career
2021-	Singapore	7	
- * Club domestic league appearances and goals

Lila Tan Hui Ying (born 4 June 2003) is a Singaporean professional footballer who plays as a midfielder for Manningham United Blues and the Singapore women's national team.

== Early life and education ==
Tan was born to a Singaporean father, a business consultant, and a French mother, a corporate general manager. Tan is the eldest child with three younger brothers. She spent fourteen years in Shanghai, China before moving back to Singapore in 2020 during the COVID-19 pandemic.

After moving back to Singapore, Tan studied at HWA International School.

== Career ==
Tan had a clothing brand, aiheartyou.

== Modelling career ==
Tan worked as a freelance model and then signed up with a modelling agency. She was a 2021 Miss Universe Singapore finalist.

== Football career ==
=== Club career ===
As a youth player, Tan joined the youth academy of Chinese side AKSIL. In 2022, she signed for Lion City Sailors (Women's Premier League) in Singapore.

In 2024, Lila signed as a forward with Albirex Niigata (S) for the 2024 season. She finished the season with 5 goals for the team.

In 2025, Lila signed with Still Aerion WFC and was featured in the WPL All-Stars squad against Brisbane Roar on 4 April 2025. Lila proceed to score 7 goals for Still Aerion for the 2025 Women's Premier League season.

On 14 August 2026, Manningham United announced the signing of Lila from Still Aerion.

=== International career ===
On the sports front, Lila was called up for trials with in 2020. She was later selected for the national team for the AFC Women's Asian Cup qualification matches held at Tajikistan in September 2021.

=== International ===
==== International caps ====
No	Date	Venue	Opponent	Result	Competition
1	23 June 2022	Jalan Besar Stadium, Singapore	Hong Kong	0–4 (lost)	Friendly
2	26 June 2022	Jalan Besar Stadium, Singapore	Hong Kong	0–1 (lost)	Friendly
3	4 July 2022	Biñan Football Stadium, Philippines	Malaysia	0-0 (draw)	2022 AFF Women's Championship
4	12 July 2022	Biñan Football Stadium, Philippines	Indonesia	2–0 (won)	2022 AFF Women's Championship
5	10 Oct 2022	Jalan Besar Stadium, Singapore	Indonesia	1–2 (lost)	Friendly
6	2 Apr 2023	Chonburi Stadium, Thailand	Thailand	0–6 (lost)	2024 AFC Women's Olympic Qualifying Tournament
7	4 Apr 2023	Chonburi Stadium, Thailand	Mongolia	2-2 (draw)	2024 AFC Women's Olympic Qualifying Tournament
