= Tay Ying =

Singaporean actress (born 1996)

- Born: 27 March 1996 (age 30); Singapore
- Other names: Zheng Ying
- Education: Temasek Polytechnic
- Alma mater: RMIT University (Singapore Institute of Management)
- Occupation: Actress
- Years active: 2017–present
- Spouse: Wu Sihan (m. 2025)
- Parents: Zheng Geping; Hong Huifang
- Relatives: Calvert Tay (brother)

Chinese name
- Traditional Chinese: 鄭穎
- Simplified Chinese: 郑颖
- Hanyu Pinyin: Zhèng Yǐng

Tay Ying (born 27 March 1996) is a Singaporean actress and who has appeared in both English- and Mandarin-language television dramas since her debut in 2017. She became a full-time Mediacorp artiste in 2022.

== Early life and career ==
Tay is the daughter of actors Zheng Geping and Hong Huifang. Her brother Calvert, who is four years younger, is an aspiring actor and singer.

Tay graduated with a diploma in hospitality and tourism management from Temasek Polytechnic in May 2017. The same year, she was named the brand ambassador of hair products Shiseido Professional. She is also a taekwondo expert just like her father as well.

In 2018, she made her English debut in the Channel 5 drama series Missing, where she appeared alongside Rebecca Lim and Pierre Png.

In 2019, Tay attended acting classes at the acting school Motown in Shanghai, China, for three months. She also starred in the wushu-themed series The Good Fight, which her father is the executive producer of the chinese martial arts drama. She graduated from RMIT University via Singapore Institute of Management with a business marketing degree the same year.

In 2021, she starred in the six-part half-hour Channel 5 drama series Slow Dancing, based on the best-selling e-book by local writer Noelle.

Tay was once signed to celebrity hairstylist Addy Lee's talent agency Starlist. From 2018 to 2022, she was managed by Artiste Co. In January 2022, Tay signed on with Mediacorp as a full-time artiste.

In 2023, Tay appeared in the mystery thriller series Silent Walls, as well as in the action drama series Shero and long-form series My One and Only.

== Personal life ==
Tay Ying met Wu Sihan, a Singaporean head chef in 2021. Wu became a celebrity chef after signing with Mediacorp in 2023. They were married on 16 June 2025.

== Filmography ==
Tay has appeared in the following programmes:

=== Television series ===
- While We Are Young (2017)
- Missing (2018; Channel 5 series)
- The Good Fight (2019)
- Justice Boo (2021)
- The Lying Theory (2021; Viddsee Originals)
- Slow Dancing (2021; Channel 5 series)
- Silent Walls (2023)
- Shero (2023)
- My One and Only (2023)

=== Variety show hosting ===
- Get It Beauty On The Road (2018; tvN Asia)

== Awards and nominations ==
Year	Award	Category	Nominated work	Result	Ref
2021	Star Awards	Top 10 Most Popular Female Artistes	—N/a	Nominated	
2024	Star Awards	Top 10 Most Popular Female Artistes	—N/a	Nominated	
2025	Star Awards	Top 10 Most Popular Female Artistes	—N/a	Nominated	
