= Nandita Banna =

Miss Universe Singapore 2021 titleholder

- Born: 8 November 2000 (age 26); Singapore
- Occupations: Model; beauty queen
- Height: 1.76 m (5 ft 9 in)
- Beauty pageant titleholder
- Title: Miss Universe Singapore 2021
- Hair color: Black
- Eye color: Brown
- Major competitions: Miss Universe Singapore 2021 (Winner); Miss Universe 2021 (Top 16)

Nandita Banna (Telugu: నందితా బాన్నా; born 8 November 2000) is a Singaporean model and beauty pageant titleholder as Miss Universe Singapore 2021. She represented Singapore at Miss Universe 2021, where she placed in the top sixteen. She was the first Singapore representative to reach the semi-finals of the Miss Universe pageant in 34 years since Miss Universe 1987.

== Early life and education ==
Nandita Banna was born in Singapore to a Telugu family, Madhuri and Govardhan Banna. Her parents migrated from Srikakulam, Andhra Pradesh to Singapore circa 1996. Banna was subsequently born on 8 November 2000 in Singapore. Banna is fluent in 3 languages: English, Hindi and Telugu.

Banna completed her secondary education at Raffles Girls' School, and subsequently enrolled into Raffles Institution for her pre-university education. As of October 2021, she had been studying at Singapore Management University for three years for a double degree for Business Administration and Information Systems (Business Analytics).

== Career ==
=== Modelling ===
Prior to participating in Miss Universe Singapore 2021, Banna was a model and was featured in the December 2020/January 2021 issue of Vogue Singapore, and in March 2021 issue as well. As of 2021, she is signed under a modelling agency known as Misc Management Agency.

=== Pageantry ===
==== Miss Universe Singapore 2021 ====
Banna was one of the eight finalists for Miss Universe Singapore 2021. Due to the COVID-19 pandemic, national director and former Miss Universe Singapore 2011, Valerie Lim crowned Banna on 17 September, taking over the crown from the outgoing titleholder Bernadette Belle Ong.

==== Miss Universe 2021 ====
Banna travelled to Israel on 28 November to compete at the 70th Miss Universe pageant in Eilat, Israel. On 13 December 2021, she placed in the Top 16, breaking the 34-year drought of Singapore in the semi-finals.

Awards and achievements
Preceded by Bernadette Ong	Miss Universe Singapore; 2021	Succeeded by Carissa Yap
