= Ho Lye Toh =

Singaporean weightlifter and Miss Singapore (born 1923)

Ho Lye Toh doing a snatch lift

Ho Lye Toh (born 1923) is a Singaporean retired weightlifter and a three times former Miss Singapore.

== Biography ==
Toh's father was Ho Peng Khoen, a school teacher and Malayan weightlifting champion. He encouraged Ho to weightlift in order to build up her strength, rewarding her with small gifts as she lifted greater weights. Eventually she mastered the snatch-lift.

Ho also entered beauty pageants winning several times but was forced to stop following the Japanese invasion of Singapore during World War II. She tried again after the war but her boyfriend asked her to stop as she was too successful.

Ho married a photographer at the age of 28, and give birth to her first child at 29. Her husband died at the age of 59.

Ho has spoken out in favour of dementia-related causes, and supported the Enabling Festival in 2018.
