= Lynn Tan =

Singaporean model and beauty pageant titleholder

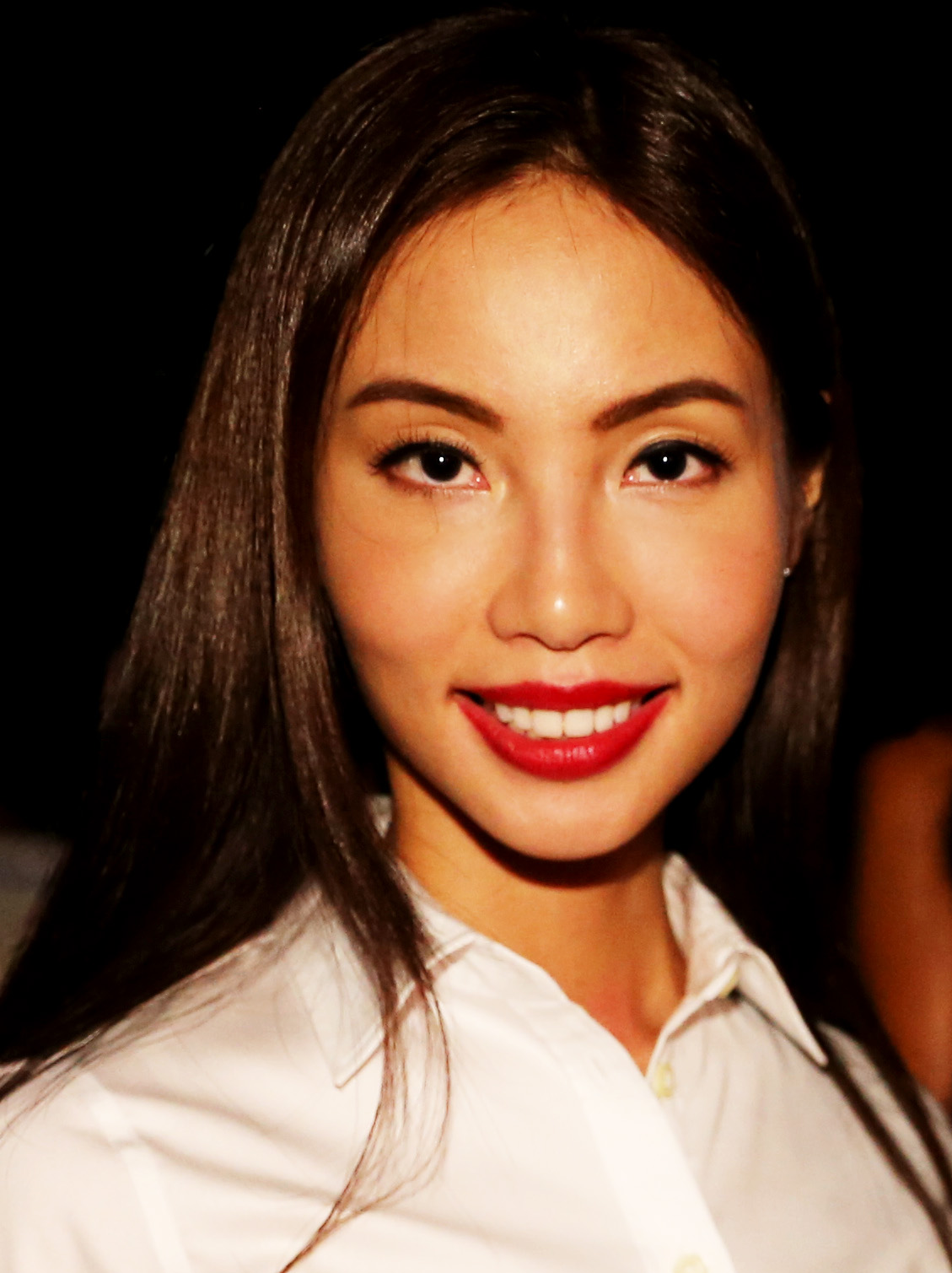
- Tan in 2014
- Born: 24 February 1988 (age 38); Singapore
- Height: 1.71 m (5 ft 7 1/2 in)
- Beauty pageant titleholder
- Title: Miss Singapore Universe 2012
- Hair color: Black
- Eye color: Brown
- Major competitions: Miss Universe 2012 (Unplaced)

Lynn Tan (born 24 February 1988) is a Singaporean model and beauty pageant titleholder who won Miss Universe Singapore 2012. She represented Singapore in the 2012 Miss Universe pageant.

== Education ==
Tan studied at CHIJ Saint Nicholas Girls' School and Raffles Junior College. She has a degree in Information Systems from Singapore Management University

== Career ==
Tan previously worked in mergers and acquisitions at Deloitte & Touche and UBS.

=== Pageant career ===
==== Miss Singapore Universe 2012 ====
Tan was the winner of Miss Universe Singapore 2012 and also won three other awards, Miss Body Beautiful, Miss Lumiere International and Miss Sensational Smile.

==== Miss Universe 2012 ====
Tan represented Singapore at Miss Universe 2012 in Las Vegas, USA but was unplaced at the pageant on December 19, 2012.

=== Modelling career ===
In 2011, Tan also won the FHM Model of the Year (Singapore) competition.

In 2012, Tan was awarded the Star Model of Singapore award at the Asian Models Festival Awards in Seoul, Korea.

Lynn was a part-time model in university and has modeled for brands such as La Perla, Softbake, Mondial Jewelry, Luxor Champagne, Ecco, Epson and Singtel.

Awards and achievements
Preceded by Valerie Lim	Miss Singapore Universe; 2012	Succeeded by Shi Lim
