= Shi Lim =

Singaporean model

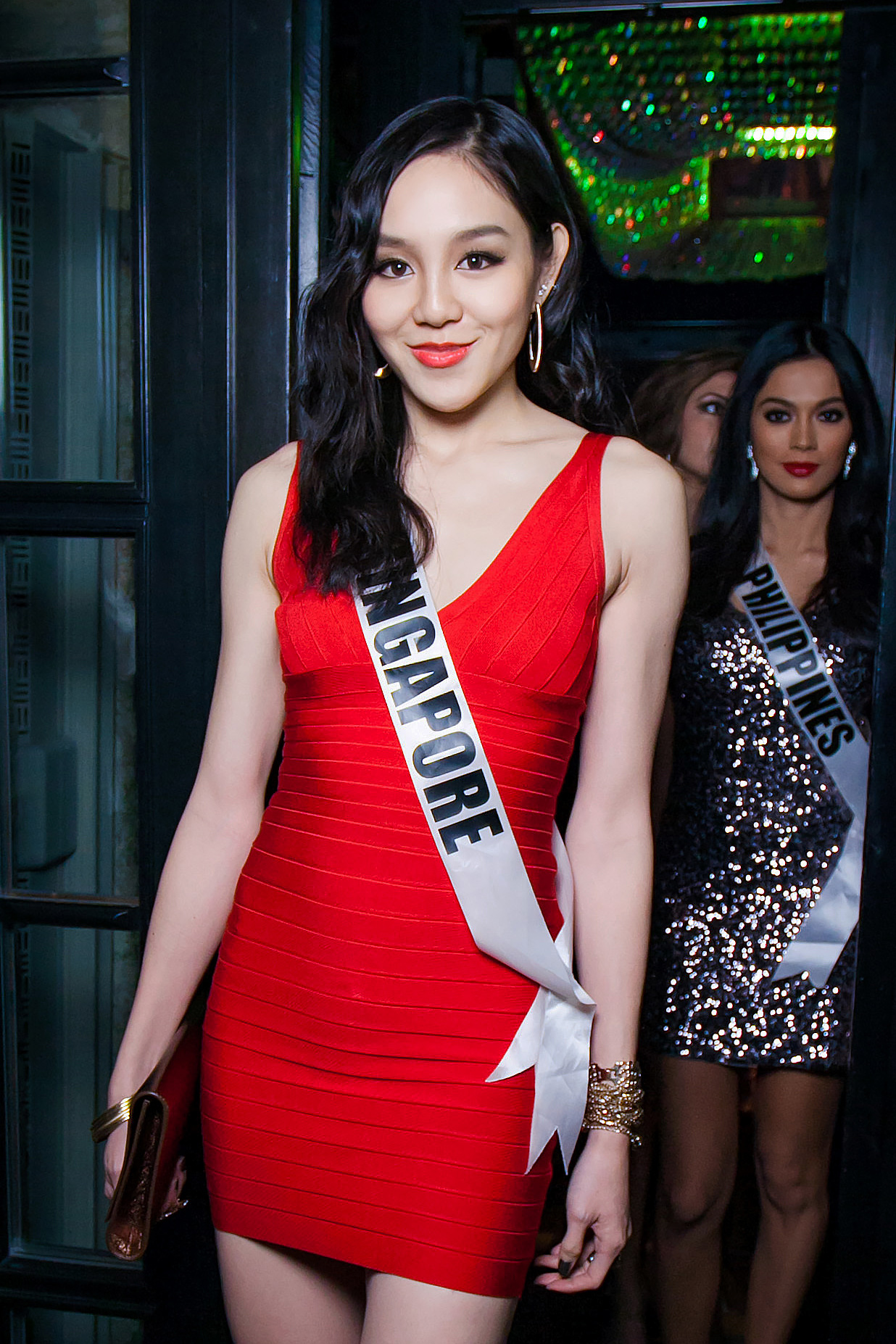
- Born: Shi Lim; 1988 (age 37–38); Singapore
- Height: 1.78 m (5 ft 10 in)
- Beauty pageant titleholder
- Title: Miss Universe Singapore 2013
- Hair color: Black
- Major competitions: Miss Universe Singapore 2013 (Winner); Miss Universe 2013 (Unplaced)

Shi Lim (simplified Chinese: 林诗; traditional Chinese: 林詩; born 1988) is a Singaporean model and beauty pageant titleholder who won the title of Miss Universe Singapore 2013 and represented Singapore at the Miss Universe 2013 pageant. She also competed on the 5th season of Supermodel Me.

== Education ==
Lim studied at New York University and graduated with a Bachelor of Arts in individualised study (specialising in cognitive science).

== Pageant career ==
=== Miss Singapore Universe 2013 ===
Lim was crowned Miss Universe Singapore 2013 at the conclusion of the event held on 6 July 2013 at the Shangri-La Hotel Singapore. The first runner-up was Cheryl Desiree Chan, a 23-year-old student and entrepreneur and the second runner-up was Cordelia Low, a 24-year-old events coordinator.

=== Miss Universe 2013 ===
Lim represented Singapore at Miss Universe 2013 in Moscow, Russia but she was unplaced at the pageant.

== Personal life ==
Lim moved with her family to Canada in 2004 as her father was doing his Masters in Canada. They moved back to Singapore two years later when he finished his master's degree.

Awards and achievements
Preceded by Lynn Tan	Miss Singapore Universe; 2013	Succeeded by Rathi Menon
