= Cheryl Chou =

Singaporean model and actress (born 1996)

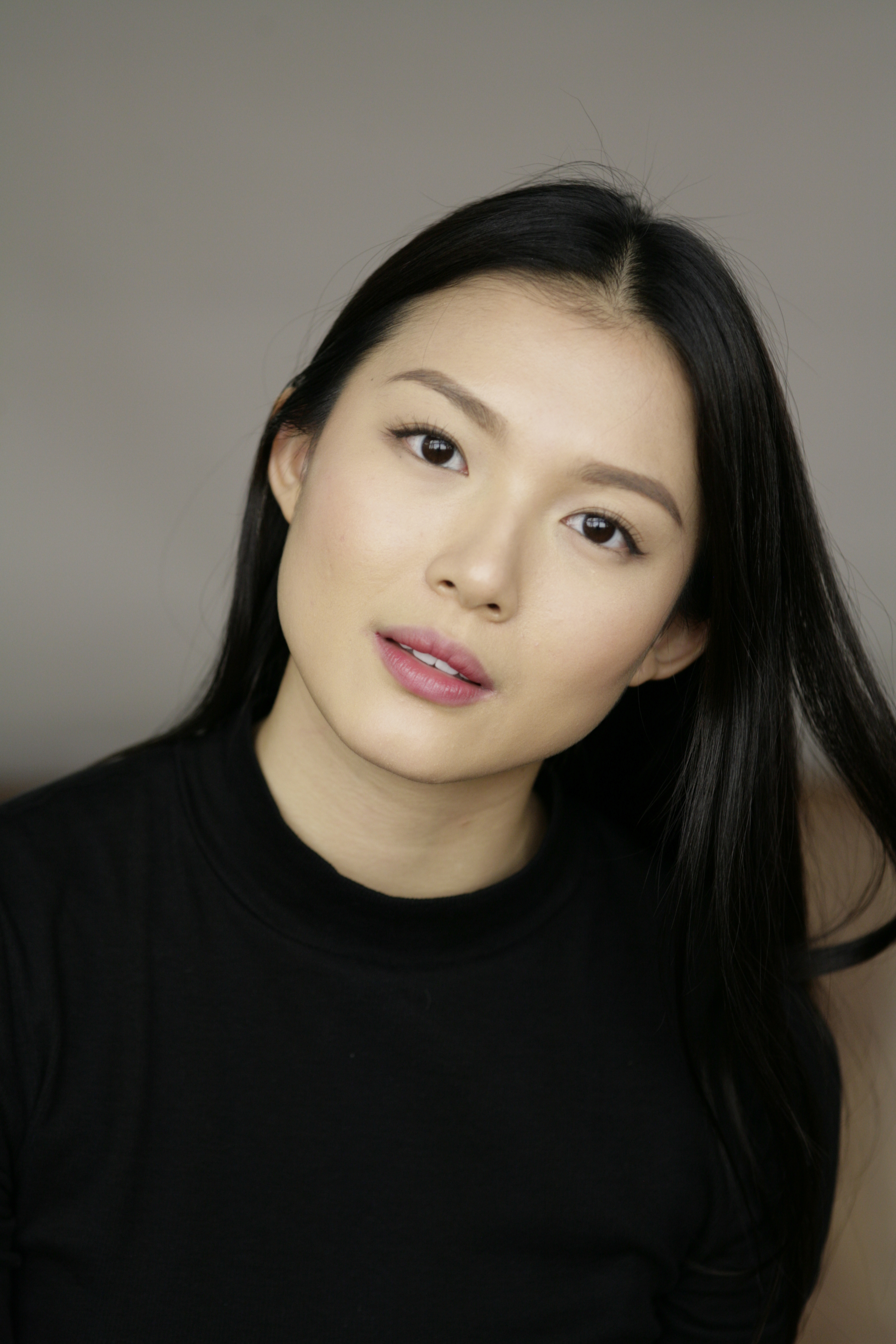
- Chou in 2017
- Born: 15 March 1996 (age 30); Singapore
- Education: LASALLE College of the Arts (BA)
- Occupations: Actress; host; model
- Modeling information
- Hair color: Black
- Eye color: Dark brown
- Agency: The Celebrity Agency

Chinese name
- Chinese: 周智慧
- Hanyu Pinyin: Zhōu Zhìhuì

Cheryl Chou (born 15 March 1996) is a Singaporean actress, TV host, model and beauty pageant titleholder. She joined the entertainment industry after being crowned Miss Universe Singapore 2016.

== Early and personal life ==
Chou was born and raised in Singapore before moving at the age of 8 to Shanghai, China, where she stayed for 10 years. She studied at the Shanghai Singapore International School and graduated with an IB Diploma at 18.

Both her parents are based in Shanghai. Her mother runs a wine machine distribution business and her father is an operations manager.

Chou spent her freshman year of college at the Savannah College of Art and Design, majoring in Fashion Marketing and Management. She then moved back to Singapore and attended LASALLE College of the Arts, majoring in BA (Hons) Fashion Media and Industries.

Aside from being able to speak fluent English and Mandarin, she is also able to converse effectively in Cantonese.

She also has a nickname of "Song Hye-kyo of Singapore" and can professionally play guitar.

== Career ==
=== Miss Universe ===
In 2016, Chou entered the Miss Universe Singapore pageant, where she won the title of Miss Universe Singapore 2016.

The judges found her answer to the question "What do you believe is the essence of a true Singapore woman?" during the Q&A segment to be the best of the lot. Her response was: "A woman who is confident in her own skin and not afraid of failure and to follow her dreams."

She represented Singapore at Miss Universe 2016 competition in Manila, Philippines, but was unplaced.

=== Acting and hosting ===
Chou has hosting experience in Hong Kong by hosting a travel programme namely the "Beautivels".

On 13 April 2023, she signed a contract with The Celebrity Agency (TCA), officially joining Mediacorp.

== Filmography ==
=== Film ===
| Year | Title | Role | Notes | Ref. |
|---|---|---|---|---|
| 2025 | A Good Child (好孩子) | Grace | | |

=== Television series ===
| Year | Title | Role | Network | Notes | Ref. |
|---|---|---|---|---|---|
| 2018 | VIC | Queenie | Toggle | | |
| 2018 | 29 February (229明天见) | Tang Shuangying | Mediacorp Channel 8 | | |
| 2019 | Fried Rice Paradise | Girly Danker | Mediacorp Channel 5 | | |
| 2020 | Adulting | Clarissa | meWATCH | | |
| 2020 | Love By Numbers | Jane | meWATCH | | |
| 2021 | My Star Bride | Xiao Songya | Mediacorp Channel 8 | | |
| 2021 | Reunion | Jasmine Yeh | meWATCH | | |
| 2021 | Lightspeed | Charlene | meWATCH | | |
| 2021 | The Cutting Edge | Zoe Song | meWATCH | | |
| 2021 | Love at First Flight 2 | Claudia | YouTube | | |
| 2022 | Soul Doctor (灵医) | Chloe Lam | meWATCH | | |
| 2022 | Soul Detective | Chloe Lam | Mediacorp Channel 8 | | |
| 2023 | Strike Gold | Kerin Chong | Mediacorp Channel 8 | | |
| 2023 | Silent Walls | Angela | Mediacorp Channel 8 | | |
| 2023 | Shero | Zhou Jingyu | Mediacorp Channel 8 | | |
| 2024 | Love on a Shoestring (完全省钱恋爱手册) | Elly | Mediacorp Channel U & TVBS | | |
| 2024 | Furever Yours (宠他，还是爱我？) | Zhang Wenyu | Mediacorp Channel 8 | | |
| 2025 | Devil Behind The Gate (庭外的一角) | Fang Ai Xin | Mediacorp Channel 8 | | |
| 2025 | Perfectly Imperfect (活出好命来) | Fan Xiao Wen/When | Mediacorp Channel 8 | | |

=== Television shows ===
| Year | Title | Role | Network | Notes | Ref. |
|---|---|---|---|---|---|
| 2020 | Beautivels (神奇旅俠) | Host | HOY TV | EP3-4 | |

== Awards and nominations ==
| Organisation | Year | Category | Nominated work | Result | Ref |
|---|---|---|---|---|---|
| Star Awards | 2023 | Top 3 Most Popular Rising Stars | —N/a | Nominated | |
| Star Awards | 2024 | Top 3 Most Popular Rising Stars | —N/a | Nominated | |
| Star Awards | 2025 | Top 10 Most Popular Female Artistes | —N/a | Nominated | |
| Star Awards | 2026 | Best Actress | Perfectly Imperfect | Nominated | |
| Star Awards | 2026 | Top 10 Most Popular Female Artistes | —N/a | Nominated | |
