= Miss Universe Malaysia 1965 =

3rd edition of Miss Universe Malaysia

- Date: 12 June 1965
- Venue: Merdeka Stadium, Kuala Lumpur
- Director: Junior Chamber of Malaya
- Entrants: 14
- Placements: 5
- Debuts: Kedah; Perlis
- Winner: Patricia Augustus; Penang

Miss Malaysia 1965, the 2nd edition of the Miss Universe Malaysia, was held on 12 June 1965 at the Merdeka Stadium, Kuala Lumpur. Patricia Augustus of Penang was crowned by the outgoing titleholder, Angela Filmer of Selangor at the end of the event. She then represented Malaysia at the Miss Universe 1965 pageant in Miami, Florida.

== Results ==
Final Results	Contestants
Miss Malaysia 1965	Penang – Patricia Augustus
1st Runner-Up	Singapore – Alice Woon
2nd Runner-Up	Selangor – Clara De Run

== Delegates ==
14 delegates from each states competed for the title.

- Johore - Jenny Lim Poh Choo
- Kedah - Kamaliah Binte Sa'ad
- Kelantan - Rohani Salleh
- Melaka - Anom Binte Kamal
- Negri Sembilan - Joyce Lim
- Pahang - Shirley Wong
- Penang - Patricia Augustus
- Perlis - Saadiah Ahmad
- Perak - Helen Lee Ling
- Sabah - Shirley Cheng
- Sarawak - Nancy Blassan
- Selangor - Clara De Run
- Singapore - Alice Woon
- Trengganu - Hasnah Binte Yunus

== State Pageants ==
Miss Johore 1965

- Winner - Jenny Lim
- 1st Runner-up - Suzanna Looh
- 2nd Runner-up - Shirley Leong

Miss Negri Sembilan 1965

- Winner - Joyce Lim
- 1st Runner-up - Wan Mariam Wan Ibrahim
- 2nd Runner-up - Jane Foong

Miss Perak Universe 1965

- Winner - Helen Lee Ling
- 1st Runner-up - Zainab Mohamed Salleh
- 2nd Runner-up - Margaret Ong

Miss Sarawak Universe 1965

- Winner - Nancy Blassan
- 1st Runner-up - Elizabeth Ong
- 2nd Runner-up - Fatimah Abdul Rahman

Miss Selangor Universe 1965

- Winner - Clara De Run
- 1st Runner-up - Canny Moo
- 2nd Runner-up - Adriane Lim

Miss Singapore Universe 1965

- Winner - Alice Woon
- 1st Runner-up - Yvonne Wee
- 2nd Runner-up - Nandaria Roop

== Notes ==
- The 2nd Runner-up Clara De Run of Selangor later then competed in the national pageant of Miss Malaysia World 1965 which was also held at the Merdeka Stadium, Kuala Lumpur and eventually won. She then represented Malaysia at the Miss World 1965.
- Singapore was still a part of Malaysia until separated on August 9, 1965.
