= Miss Malaya 1954 =

Miss Malaya 1954, held on 28 June 1954

- Date: 28 June 1954
- Venue: Capitol Theatre, Singapore
- Director: Shaw Bros
- Sponsor: Shaw Brothers; Straits Times
- Entrants: 24
- Placements: 10
- Winner: Marjorie Wee; Malayan Airways

Miss Malaya 1954, was held on 28 June 1954 at the Capitol Theatre, Singapore. 21 candidates from across Malaya and Singapore and 3 candidates from Sarawak participated in this year's competition. Most of the candidates were nominated by various organisations such as Qantas Boac, Fortune Advertising Ltd., Robinson and Co. Ltd., Malayan Airways, Shewan Tomes and more but individual entries were also welcomed to compete in the pageant. The prizes of the pageant were a free trip to America, a trip to Hong Kong, and a trip either to Penang or Singapore.

Marjorie Wee, a 21-year-old air hostess represented Malayan Airways won the title at the end of the event. Wee was supposed to debut in Miss Universe 1954 as Miss Malaya but due to several reasons she had to represent Singapore instead in the pageant held in Long Beach, California, United States.

== Requirements ==
In order to compete in Miss Malaya 1954 pageant, the candidates must:

- Be born in Singapore or the Federation, ages 18 to 28.
- Reside in Malaya for at least three years.

== Result ==
Final Results	Contestants
Miss Malaya 1954	Malayan Airways – Marjorie Wee
1st Runner-up	Miss Kuala Lumpur – Violet Sleigh
2nd Runner-up	Miss Singapore – Rugayah Ibrahim
3rd Runner-up	Miss Federation of Malaya – Vanaja Mandhavan
Top 10	Fortune Advertising – Dorothy de Souza; Miss Sarong and Kebaya Sarawak – Nora Chan; Miss Singapore – Phyllis Westerhout; Miss Singapore – Jeannette McLachlan; Qantas Boac Airways – Violet Ooi; Far Eastern Music School – Corrine Siddons

== Candidates ==
24 candidates competed for the crown and title.

1. Marjorie Wee, 21, of Singapore (nominated by Malayan Airways)
2. Violet Sleigh, 19, of Kuala Lumpur (1st Runner-up Miss Federation of Malaya 1954 - nominated by Robinson and Co. Ltd.)
3. Rugayah Ibrahim, 19, of Singapore
4. Vanaja Mandhavan, 18, of Telok Anson (Miss Federation of Malaya 1954)
5. Nora Chan, 18, of Sarawak (Miss Sarong and Kebaya Sarawak 1954)
6. Dorothy de Souza, 23 (nominated by Fortune Advertising)
7. Phyllis Westerhout,18, of Singapore
8. Jeannette McLachlan, of Singapore
9. Violet Ooi (nominated by Qantas Boac Airways)
10. Corrine Siddons (nominated by Far Eastern Music School)
11. Jamiah Mohammed, of Sarawak
12. Maria Menado, 20, of Singapore
13. Surina Marier, of Singapore
14. Joyce Sleigh, 18, of Kuala Lumpur (3rd Runner-up Miss Federation of Malaya 1954 - nominated by Robinson and Co. Ltd.)
15. Doris Ware, 18, of Singapore
16. Elvyna Ollenbach, 20, of Raub
17. Linda Bodestyne, 18
18. Julia Phua, 25, of Indonesia (nominated by Messrs Shewan Tomes & Co. Ltd.)
19. Vicky Elias, 23, of Singapore
20. Ivy Koh, 18, of Singapore
21. Pat Darby, 21 (2nd Runner-up Miss Federation of Malaya 1954)
22. S. Henderson, of Taiping (Top 6 Miss Federation of Malaya 1954)
23. Sahriffah Syed Abdyllah Idin, of Alor Setar (Top 6 Miss Federation of Malaya 1954)
24. Elsie Divinia Mowe, of Sarawak
