= Star Awards for Best Theme Song =

Singaporean television award

Star Awards for Best Theme Song 最佳主题曲
- Current: Star Awards 2026
- Awarded for: Most popular and best performance by a theme song in a Mediacorp drama series
- Country: Singapore
- Presented by: Mediacorp
- First award: 1997
- Currently held by: 落花如雨 by Kit Chan (2026)

The Star Awards for Best Theme Song is an award presented annually at the Star Awards, a ceremony that was established in 1994.

The category was introduced in 1997, at the 4th Star Awards ceremony; Sebastian Tan received the award for his theme song, "和平的代价" in The Price of Peace and it is given in honour of a theme song in a Mediacorp drama serial which has delivered an outstanding overall performance. The nominees are determined by a team of judges employed by Mediacorp. Prior to 2014, winners are selected by a majority vote from the entire judging panel. This rule was amended from 2014 onwards such that winners are selected by a majority vote from both the entire judging panel and the public via online voting.

Since its inception, the award has been given to 16 performers or performer groups. Kit Chan is the most recent winner in this category for their theme song "落花如雨" in Emerald Hill - The Little Nyonya Story. Since the ceremony held in 2016, The Dream Makers is the only drama theme song to win in this category twice. In addition, Perfect Cut, The Unbeatables & Blessings are the dramas theme song that have been nominated on two occasions, more than any other drama theme songs. They also hold the record for the most nominations without a win.

== Recipients ==
Year	Song title	Singer	Drama title	Nominees	Ref
1997	"和平的代价"	Sebastian Tan 陈瑞彪	The Price of Peace	Jonathan Lee and Zoe Tay — The Unbeatables II ("当爱擦身而过"); Cass Phang — A Different Life 妈姐情缘 ("似水年华"); Mavis Hee — Living by Night 都是夜归人 ("夜归"); Fann Wong and Jeff Chang — Brave New World 新阿郎 ("别让情两难")	
1998	"我无所谓"	A-mei	Rising Expectations 长河	Stella Chang 张清芳 — Legend of the Crow 乌丫传说 (《淡淡的忧》); Chew Chor Meng 周初明 — Living in Geylang 芽笼芽笼 (《芽笼芽笼》); Kit Chan 陈洁仪 — Myths & Legends of Singapore 石叻坡传说 (《季节》); Different Cuts Different Strokes ensemble 《剪剪大家乐》全体演员 — Different Cuts Different Strokes 剪剪大家乐 ("Very Nice")	
1999	"我吃得起苦"	Power Station	Stepping Out	Ann Kok 郭舒贤 — Wok of Life 福满人间 (《福满人间》); Fann Wong 范文芳 — Out to Win 步步为赢 ("LUV 3"); Wu Jiaming 吴佳明 — Legend of the Eight Immortals 东游记 (《逍遥游》); Zoe Tay 郑惠玉 — Lost Soul 另类佳人 (《翩翩入梦》)	
2000	"家事"	Kit Chan	My Home Affairs 家事	Meng FM 梦FM — Angel's Dream 真相 (《我的沉默》); Tay Ping Hui 郑斌辉 — As You Like It 随心所欲 (《What I Want to Do》); Mavis Hee 许美静 — Hainan Kopi Tales 琼园咖啡香 (《咖啡香》); Fann Wong 范文芳 — The Legendary Swordsman 笑傲江湖 (《豪情笑江湖》)	
2001	"光芒"	William So	The Challenge 谁与争锋	Fann Wong 范文芳 — Heroes in Black 我来也 (《我来也匆匆去也匆匆》); Meng FM 梦FM — Master Swordsman Lu Xiaofeng 2 陆小凤之凤舞九天 (《天外有情》); Meng FM 梦FM — Through Thick And Thin 阿灿正传 (《天天好心情》); Esther Ong 王敏惠 — Three Women and A Half 三个半女人 (《昨日的眼泪》)	
2002	"河水山"	Deng Miaohua 邓妙华	Bukit Ho Swee	Rui En 瑞恩 — Beautiful Connection 九层糕 (《快乐方式》); Michelle Saram 郑雪儿 — Fantasy 星梦情真 (《星梦》); Donnie Chan 陈国荣 — I Not Stupid 小孩不笨 (《有用的人》); Esther Ong 王敏惠 — Viva Le Famille 好儿好女 (《不要轻易松手》)	
2003	"为明天"	Michael Wong	A Child's Hope	Deng Xuehua 邓雪华, Deng Miaohua 邓妙华 & Deng Guihua 邓桂华 — Holland V 荷兰村 (《快乐密码》); Sharon Au 欧菁仙 & Wong Li-Lin 黄丽玲 — Springs of Life 春到人间 (《装傻》); Tay Ping Hui 郑斌辉 — The Unbeatables III 双天至尊 III (《灰色地带》); Cavin Soh 苏梽诚 — Viva Le Famille II 好儿好女 II (《身边的你》)	
2004	"爱在身旁"	Power Station	I Love My Home 我爱我家	Fann Wong 范文芳 — Always on My Mind 无炎的爱 (《明天还有更远的路》); Cavin Soh 苏梽诚 — Home in Toa Payoh 家在大巴窑 (《自己的天空》); Jeff Wang 王振复 — My Love, My Home 同一屋檐下 (《回来》); Tanya Chua 蔡健雅 — Timeless Gift 遗情未了 (《原来》)	
2005	"明天的幸福"	Ocean Ou	A New Life	Fish Leong 梁静茹 — Baby Blues 谁家母鸡不生蛋 (《路》); Fann Wong 范文芳 — Beautiful Illusions 镜中人 (《下一秒钟》); Joi Chua 蔡淳佳 — Destiny 梦在手里 (《梦在手里》); JJ Lin 林俊杰 — Zero to Hero 阴差阳错 (《阴差阳错》)	
2006	"触摸"	Kelvin Tan	The Shining Star	Mayday 五月天 — A Promise for Tomorrow 拥抱明天 (《知足》); Cai Mei Yi 蔡美仪 — Family Matters 法庭俏佳人 (《信任》); Joi Chua 蔡淳佳 — Rhapsody in Blue 蓝色仙人掌 (《风铃》); Chew Sin Huey 石欣卉 — The Rainbow Connection 舞出彩虹 (《舞出彩虹》)	
2007	"跟着我一起"	Tay Ping Hui	Honour and Passion	Jeff Wang 王振复 — The Peak 最高点 (《并肩的方向》); A-do 阿杜 — Kinship 手足 (《逃离》); Chew Sin Huey 石欣卉 — The Greatest Love of All 爱.特别的你 (《多一点爱》); Jeff Wang 王振复 — The Homecoming 十三鞭 (《风的肩膀》)	
2009	"如燕"	Olivia Ong	The Little Nyonya	Yi Xun 亦迅 — Just in Singapore 一房半厅一水缸 (《屋檐》); Daren Tan 陈轩昱 — Crime Busters x 2 叮当神探 (《幻听》); Chew Sin Huey 石欣卉 — Perfect Cut 一切完美 (《我知道我变漂亮了》); Mi Lu Bing 迷路兵 — The Golden Path 黄金路 (《路》); Cavin Soh 苏梽诚 — Love Blossoms 心花朵朵开 (《心花朵朵开》)	
2010	"我们"	Kelvin Tan	Together	Cavin Soh 苏梽诚 — Daddy at Home 企鹅爸爸 (《男人可贵》); Jocie Kok 郭美美 — Perfect Cut 2 一切完美2 (《放了爱》); Jeff Wang 王振复 — Table of Glory 乒乓圆 (《乒乓圆》); Jeno Liu 刘力扬 — The Ultimatum 双子星 (《寂寞光年》)	
2011	"网"	Jeff Chang	Breakout	Serene Koong 龚芝怡 — New Beginnings 红白囍事 (《在我左右》); Cavin Soh 苏梽诚 — The Best Things in Life 五福到 (《知足》); Derrick Hoh 何维健 — The Illusionist 魔幻视界 (《变化》); Huang Zhi Ren 黄智仁 — With You 我在你左右 (《感．受》)	
2012	"倔强"	Kit Chan	Devotion	Mavis Hee 许美静 — A Song to Remember 星洲之夜 (《星洲之夜》); Chriz Tong 汤薇恩 — Kampong Ties 甘榜情 (《甘榜情缘》); Anthony Neely 倪安东 — Secrets for Sale 拍·卖 (《缠斗》); Anthony Neely 倪安东 — The Oath 行医 (《救命》)	
2013	"珍惜"	Power Station	Joys of Life	Tay Kewei 郑可为 & Chriz Tong 汤薇恩 — Don't Stop Believin' 我们等你 (《真善美》); Kelvin Tan 陈伟联 & Derrick Hoh 何维健 — It Takes Two 对对碰 (《轧》); Kelvin Tan 陈伟联 — Show Hand 注定 (《分岔口》); Olivia Ong — Yours Fatefully 孤男寡女 (《幸福记号》)	
2014	"幸福不难"	Serene Koong	The Dream Makers	Alfred Sim 沈志豪 — The Journey: A Voyage 信约：唐山到南洋 (《家乡》); Romeo Tan 陈罗密欧 & Da Feng Chui 大风吹 — Sudden 骤变 (《骤变》); Mary Wong 黄丽慧 — Beyond X元素 (《呼吸》); Chriz Tong 汤薇恩 — 96°C Café 96°C咖啡 (《啡情歌》)	
2015	"信·约"	Kelvin Tan and Joi Chua	The Journey: Tumultuous Times	Lin Si Tong 林思彤 — Against the Tide 逆潮 (《黑翼心灵》); Chriz Tong 汤薇恩 — Blessings 祖先保佑 (《祖先保佑》); ah5ive The Band — C.L.I.F. 3 警徽天职 3 (《一念之差》); Power Station 动力火车 — World at Your Feet 球在你脚下 (《逐梦》)	
2016	"终于"	Kit Chan	The Dream Makers II	Jack Neo 梁志强 — 118 (《够力够力》); A-do 阿杜 — Crescendo 起飞 (《好想告诉你》); Olivia Ong — The Journey: Our Homeland 信约：我们的家园 (《梦里家园》); Bonnie Loo 罗美仪 — Tiger Mum 虎妈来了 (《未知数》)	
2017	"最美的时光"	Alfred Sim	If Only I Could	Liang Wern Fook 粱文福 featuring Lorong Boys — Life - Fear Not 人生无所畏 (《人生无所畏》); Jim Lim 林倛玉 & Chew Sin Huey 石欣卉 — The Dream Job 绝世好工 (《年轮》); Kelly Poon 潘嘉丽 — You Can Be an Angel 2 你也可以是天使 2 (《天使》); Meng FM 梦FM — Eat Already? 吃饱没 (《吃饱没》)	
2018	"以刚克刚"	Kenny Khoo and Desmond Ng 黄振隆	When Duty Calls	The Freshman 插班生 — Dear DJ 亲爱的九月 (《是爱呀，哈利》); Derrick Hoh 何维健 — Dream Coder 梦想程式 (《为梦想闪耀》); Life Less Ordinary ensemble"小人物向前冲"全体演员 — Life Less Ordinary 小人物向前冲 (《小人物向前冲》); Tay Ping Hui 郑斌辉 — The Lead 第一主角 (《初衷》)	
2019	"守护你的善良"	Kelvin Tan	You Can Be An Angel 3 你也可以是天使3	Elsa Lin 林玉婷 and Wu Jia Ming 吴佳明 — Blessings 2 祖先保佑2 (《月华》); Boon Hui Lu 文慧如 - Mind Matters 心。情 (《给我一个》); The Freshman 插班生 - Reach For The Skies 不平凡的平凡 (《和你交换你的不安》); Ling Kai 铃凯 - VIC 维多利亚的模力 (《Watch Me》)	
2021	"乱"	Jones Shi 石康钧 and Ling Kai	A Quest to Heal	Nicky Lee 李玖哲 - All is Well - SG 你那边怎样.我这边OK - 新加坡篇 (《人间失格》); Misi Ke 柯泯薰 - Beijing To Moscow 北京到莫斯科 (《失去什么》); The Freshman 插班生 - Best Friends Forever 致2020的我们 (《好爱你lah》); Bonnie Loo 罗美仪 - Heart to Heart 心点心 (《幸福茶点》); Boon Hui Lu 文慧如 - Loving You 爱…没有距离 (《同行》); Jarrell Huang 黄俊融 and JJ Neo 梁嘉靖 - My One in a Million 我的万里挑一 (《就是你就是你》)	
2022	"温习"	Jocie Guo	My Star Bride	Jeremy Chan 田铭耀 - Crouching Tiger Hidden Ghost(《乱掉》); Alfred Sim 沈志豪 - CTRL 操控 (《反话》); AL4HA - Key Witness 关键证人 (《你的呼唤》); Chantalle Ng 黄暄婷, Tasha Low 刘怡伶, Ferlyn Wong 黄晶玲, Abigail, Latonia Tay - Live Your Dreams大大的梦想 (《是谁》)	
2023	"你的世界"	Lennerd Lim 林健辉	Your World In Mine	xxmxrcs (Marcus Tay) 郑骏杰 - "Genie In A Cup" 哇到宝 (《加码梦想》); Jocie Guo 郭美美 - "Love at First Bite" 遇见你，真香！ (《恋香》); Meng FM 梦FM - "When Duty Calls S2" - 卫国先锋 2 (《怒放》); Desmond Ng 黄振隆, Lingkai 铃凯 - "You Can Be An Angel S4" - 你也可以是天使4 (《天使的微笑》)	
2024	"来自星际的风"	Kim Jae Hoon 金在勋	Oppa Saranghae!	The Freshman 插班生 - Fix My Life 整你的人生 (《断舍离》); Tay Kewei & Alfred Sim 郑可为, 沈志豪 - My One and Only 只此一家 (《取暖》); Ling Kai, Shirlyn Tan 铃凯, Shirlyn Tan - Shero (《觉醒》); Boon Hui Lu 文慧如 - Till the End 陪你到最后 (《陪到最后》)	
2025	"残念"	Jim Lim	Once Upon A New Year's Eve	Matthew Teng, Lincoln Ang, Bernice Lok, Chen Rui En – Born to Shine孺子可教也 (《孺子可教也》); Ling Kai – 不同世界的你(《I Do, Do I?》); Jurine Chia – Unforgivable (《伤口》); Colbie Ong – Coded Love(《虚构》)	
2026	落花如雨	Kit Chan	Emerald Hill - The Little Nyonya Story	Bonnie Loo - Another Wok of Life (《归零》); Yao Wenlong, Chen Hanwei, Cavin Soh, Thomas Ong & Brandon Wong - Uncle Still Got It 青春小鸟(《I Believe I Can Fly》); Wang Xiaomin - Fixing Fate (《命运小偷》); Ferlyn G - The Spirit Hunter (《一剑世间》)	

^{^[I]} Each year is linked to the article about the Star Awards held that year.

== Multiple wins and nominations ==
The following Dramas Theme Songs received two or more Best Drama Theme Songs awards:

Wins	Dramas	Nominations
2	The Dream Makers	2

The following Dramas Theme Songs received two or more Best Drama Theme Songs nominations:

Nominations	Dramas
3	The Journey
2	The Dream Makers
2	Perfect Cut
2	The Unbeatables
2	Blessings
2	You Can Be An Angel Too
