= Star Awards 2007 =

Singaporean television awards

Star Awards 2007 红星大奖2007
- Date: 9 December 2007 (25th Anniversary); 16 December 2007 (Main ceremony)
- Location: MediaCorp TV Theatre
- Country: Singapore
- Hosted by: Guo Liang; Quan Yi Fong; Sharon Au (Ceremony only); Christina Lim (Post-show); Pornsak (Post-show); Mark Lee (Post-show); Jeff Wang (Post-show); Vivian Lai (Post-show)

Highlights
- Most awards: Drama: Metamorphosis (2); Variety/Info-ed: Find Me a Singaporean; Say It If You Dare 3 Star Awards 2006 (1 each)
- Most nominations: Drama: Mars vs Venus (7); Variety/Info-ed: Say It if You Dare 3 (2)
- Best Drama: Metamorphosis
- Best Variety Show: Say It If You Dare 3
- Best Actor: Zheng Geping
- Best Actress: Yvonne Lim

Television/radio coverage
- Network: MediaCorp Channel 8 MediaCorp Channel U (Post-show)
- Runtime: 180 mins (both presentations); 60 mins (Post-show); 15 mins (Prelude)

Star Awards 2007 (Chinese: 红星大奖 2007) was a television award ceremony held in Singapore. It is part of the annual Star Awards organised by MediaCorp for MediaCorp TV Channel 8. It was the first Star Awards ceremony to be broadcast in two weeks putting emphasis on two programmes; the first ceremony, broadcast on 9 December 2007, titled 红星大奖之戏剧情牵25 (lit. Star Awards 25th Drama Anniversary), commentating 25 years of drama in the Television in Singapore (the ceremony would later become a legacy of having a separate presentation of Professional and Technical awards, which would not happen until Star Awards 2010). The second show, airing 16 December 2007, would be a regular ceremony.

The 2007 ceremony was notable as it was the last ceremony to be held at the end of the year (months of December). Starting on the next ceremony of 2009, until its first exception in 2020, all the future Star Awards ceremonies would be held on the months of April (2020's ceremony however, due to the COVID-19 pandemic, resulted in the postponement of the ceremony till later date). It was also the first ceremony not to present the All-time Favourite Artiste award since the inception of the category in 2004.

== Winners and nominees ==
Unless otherwise stated, the winners are listed first, highlighted in boldface, or highlighted.

=== Prelude to Star Awards 2007 ===
A nine-episode Prelude series, titled 星光隧道 (lit. "Starlight Tunnel"), premiered on 18 October 2007 every Thursdays with Kym Ng and Dasmond Koh as hosts. The series featuring guest artistes from MediaCorp who would will be playing games with family contestants relating to the every MediaCorp produced dramas. Charlyn Lin co-hosted the islandwide roadshows to rally for the 40 nominated artistes for the Top 10 Most Popular Artistes.

=== Star Awards 25th Drama Anniversary ===
The first week of the Star Awards 2007 ceremony, titled Star Awards 25th Drama Anniversary (红星大奖之戏剧情牵25) was a special addition to the usual Star Awards in tribute to the 25th anniversary of Chinese MediaCorp drama production industries. Guo Liang and Quan Yi Fong were the hosts while Bryan Wong and Michelle Chia co-hosted for one segment. Charlyn Lin was the backstage host.

Unlike regular award ceremonies, most of the awards does not have presenters (and no handover of awards), and instead replaced by a clip show of various drama scenes.

==== Awards eligible for audience voting ====
Six out of 11 categories awarded were decided by public voting; these results were all reflected on this list:

| **My Favourite Actor 我最喜爱的男演员**: **Xie Shaoguang**; Terence Cao; Edmund Chen; Shaun Chen; Chen Hanwei; Chen Shucheng; Chen Tianwen; Chew Chor Meng; Elvin Ng; Huang Wenyong; Huang Yiliang; Christopher Lee; Li Nanxing; Richard Low; James Lye; Thomas Ong; Adrian Pang; Pierre Png; Qi Yuwu; Yao Wenlong; Cavin Soh; Tay Ping Hui; Wang Yuqing; Zhang Yaodong; Zheng Geping | **My Favourite Actress 我最喜爱的女演员**: **Huang Biren**; Jeanette Aw; Cai Pingkai 蔡平开; Felicia Chin; Chen Bifeng 陈碧凤; Chen Liping; Chen Xiuhuan; Fann Wong; Hong Huifang; Jin Yinji; Cynthia Koh; Ann Kok; Ivy Lee; Li Yinzhu; Yvonne Lim; Lin Meijiao; Jesseca Liu; Joanne Peh; Aileen Tan; Jacelyn Tay; Zoe Tay; Fiona Xie; Xiang Yun; Zeng Huifen; Zheng Wanling 郑婉龄 |

**Top Five Favourite Drama Theme Song 最喜爱的五大主题曲**
| 雾锁南洋 (The Awakening I 雾锁南洋) | **早安老师** **(Good Morning Sir 早安老师)** | 沉默的羔羊 (The Unbeatables I 双天至尊) | 铁窗 (Beyond Dawn 女子监狱) | Made in Singapore (Don't Worry, Be Happy 敢敢做个开心人) |
| 青春123 (Youth 123) (The Happy Trio 青春 123) | 落幕的心情 (The Last Applause 舞谢歌台) | 别让情两难 (Brave New World 新阿郎) | 逍遥游 (Legend of the Eight Immortals 东游记) | 知足 (A Promise for Tomorrow 拥抱明天) |
| **红头巾** **(Samsui Women 红头巾)** | 生命过客 (Finishing Line 出人头地) | 小人物的心声 (Neighbours 芝麻绿豆) | 我吃得起苦 (Stepping Out 出路) | **快乐密码** **(Holland V 荷兰村)** |
| 我的生活在这里 (Five Foot Way 五脚基) | 边缘少年 (On the Fringe 边缘少年) | 和平的代价 (The Price of Peace 和平的代价) | 福满人间 (Wok of Life 福满人间) | 为明天 (A Child's Hope 孩有明天) |
| 惑 (Mystery I 迷离夜) | **情感联络站** **(The Coffee Shop 咖啡乌)** | 城里的月光 (Tofu Street 豆腐街) | 明天的幸福 (A New Life 有福) | **触摸** **(The Shining Star 星闪闪)** |
**Screen 荧幕玉女掌门人**
| **Zoe Tay 郑惠玉** | Chen Xiuhuan 陈秀环 | Fann Wong 范文芳 | Jeanette Aw 欧萱 | Fiona Xie 谢宛谕 |
| Madeline Chu 朱乐玲 | Pan Lingling 潘玲玲 | Ivy Lee 李锦梅 | Dawn Yeoh 姚懿珊 | Joanne Peh 白薇秀 |
| Xiang Yun 向云 | Ann Kok 郭舒贤 | Yvonne Lim 林湘萍 | Jesseca Liu 刘芷绚 | Priscelia Chan 曾诗梅 |
| **Chen Li Ping 陈莉萍** | Jacelyn Tay 郑秀珍 | Li-Lin 丽玲 | **Felicia Chin 陈凤玲** | Zeng Huifen 曾慧芬 |
| Eelyn Kok 郭蕙雯 | Phyllis Quek 郭妃丽 | Jazreel Low 刘琦 | Rui En 芮恩 | Apple Hong 洪乙心 |
**Screen Heartthrob 荧幕金童掌门人**
| Wang Yuqing 王昱清 | **Li Nanxing 李南星** | Qin Wei 秦伟 | Elvin Ng 黄俊雄 | Alan Tern 唐育书 |
| **Huang Wenyong 黄文永** | Christopher Lee 李铭顺 | Terence Cao 曹国辉 | Edmund Chen 陈之财 | Allan Wu 吴振宇 |
| Hugo Ng 吴瑰岸 | Thomas Ong 王沺裁 | Chew Chor Meng 周初明 | Pierre Png 方展发 | Shaun Chen 陈泓宇 |
| Chen Tianwen 陈天文 | James Lye 赖兴祥 | Chen Hanwei 陈汉玮 | Tay Ping Hui 郑斌辉 | Julian Hee 许立桦 |
| Hoong Kuo Juey 洪国锐 | **Qi Yuwu 戚玉武** | Sean Say 成建辉 | Zhang Yao Dong 张耀栋 | Adam Chen 詹金泉 |
**Top Five Favourite Dramas 最喜爱的五大连续剧**
| Stand By Me 家人有约 | On The Fringe 边缘少年 | **The Unbeatables** **双天至尊** | **Stepping Out** **出路** | Legend of the Eight Immortals 东游记 |
| Beyond the Axis of Truth 法医 X 档案 | The Coffee Shop 咖啡乌 | Chronicles of Life 缘尽今生 | Samsui Women 红头巾 | Airforce 空军 |
| Beautiful Connection 九层糕 | A New Life 有福 | Golden Pillow 金枕头 | **Wok of Life** **福满人间** | As You Like It 随心所遇 |
| **Holland V** **荷兰村** | The Shining Star 星闪闪 | The Price of Peace 和平的代价 | Tofu Street 豆腐街 | The Winning Team 飞跃巅峰 |
| Mystery I 迷离夜 | Good Morning Sir 早安老师 | **The Awakening** **雾锁南洋** | The Guest People 客家之歌 | Army Series 新兵小传 |

==== Awards decided By professional judges ====
The other five awards are determined by professional judges. The table lists only the winners, in alphabetical order.

| **Most Memorable Role 经典人物**: Chen Liping 陈莉萍 – Good Morning, Sir! 早安! 老师 as Ai Yo Yo; Chen Liping 陈莉萍 – Holland V 荷兰村 as Mo Wan Wan; Chew Chor Meng 周初明 – Don't Worry Be Happy 敢敢做个开心人 as Ah Bee; Xiang Yun 向云 and Huang Wen Yong 黄文永 – The Awakening 雾锁南洋 as Ah Mei and Ah Shui; Zoe Tay 郑惠玉 – Pretty Faces 三面夏娃 as Bo Bo | **Favourite On-screen Partners 最佳荧幕搭档**: Christopher Lee 李铭顺 and Fann Wong 范文芳 – Return of The Condor Heroes 神雕侠侣; Edmund Chen 陈之财 and Ivy Lee 李锦梅 – Double Happiness 喜临门; Huang Wen Yong 黄文永 and Xiang Yun 向云 – The Awakening 雾锁南洋; Li Nan Xing 李南星 and Zoe Tay 郑惠玉 – The Unbeatables 双天至尊; Xie Shao Guang 谢韶光 and Huang Bi Ren 黄碧仁 – Stand By Me 家人有约 |
| **Evergreen Veteran 艺坛常青树**: Chen Shu Cheng 陈澍城; Huang Wen Yong 黄文永; Li Yin Zhu 李茵珠; Xiang Yun 向云 | **Most Memorable Characters 经典人物**: Alex Man 万梓良, Zoe Tay 郑惠玉 and Fann Wong 范文芳 – Golden Pillow 金枕头; Fiona Xie 谢宛俞, Jeanette Aw 欧萱, Felicia Chin 陈凤玲, Hsiao Qiao 小娇 – The Champion 任我遨游; Hong Hui Fang 洪慧芳 and Carole Lin 林晓佩 – Price of Peace 和平的代价; Top View of Immigrants – The Awakening 雾锁南洋; Xie Shao Guang 谢韶光 and Ivy Lee 李锦梅 – Stepping Out 出路 |
**Top 10 Most Evil Roles in Dramas 十大恶人**: Chen Han Wei 陈汉玮 – A Life of Hope 活下去; Chew Chor Meng 周初明 – The Reunion 顶天立地; Ivy Lee 李锦梅 – The Wing of Desire 天使的诱惑; Yvonne Lim 林湘萍 – Portrait of Home 同心圆; Andrew Seow 萧乙铭 – Love is Beautiful 美丽家庭; Cavin Soh 苏智诚 – Portrait of Home 同心圆; Rayson Tan 陈泰铭 – The Homecoming 十三鞭; Tay Ping Hui 郑斌辉 – The Unbeatables 双天至尊; Jeff Wang 王建復 – Holland V 荷兰村; Xie Shao Guang 谢韶光 – Golden Pillow 金枕头

=== Star Awards 2007 Awards Ceremony ===
The second week of Star Awards 2007, broadcast on 16 December 2007, was the main ceremony.

==== Backstage achievement awards ceremony ====
As like preceding ceremonies, professional and technical awards were presented before the main ceremony via a clip montage due to time constraints. The lists of winners are only reflected in the table.

| **Best Director 最佳导演**: **Chong Liung Man 张龙敏 – Mars VS Venus 幸福双人床** | **Best Screenplay 最佳剧本**: **Rebecca Leow 廖素馨 – Mars VS Venus 幸福双人床** |
| **Best Set Design 最佳美术设计**: **Ho Hock Choon 何福春 – Metamorphosis 破茧而出** | **Best Drama Cameraman 最佳戏剧摄影**: **Lim Hap Choon 林合存 – Metamorphosis 破茧而出** |
| **Best Drama Design 最佳戏剧服装设计**: **Fook Xue Ching 傅雪清 and Justin Lee 李振安 – Like Father, Like Daughter 宝贝父女兵** | **Best Drama Set Design 最佳戏剧布景设计**: **Oh Hock Leong 胡福隆 and Ho Hock Choon 何福春 – Kinship (season 1) 手足I** |
| **Best Variety Programmer 最佳综艺编导**: **Glen Lim 林祥平 and Lim Shiong Chiang 林雄强 – Campus SuperStar (Season 2 Grand Finals) 校园SuperStar 2 – 总决赛** | **Best Variety Research Writer 最佳综艺资料撰稿**: **Ng Bee Yen 黄美燕 – Lead Me On 贤人指路** |
**Best Promotional Video 最佳宣传短片**: **Teo Kok Tung 张国彤 – S-POP Hurray! Audition "Groove" S-Pop万岁！创作大赛征选 – "Groove"**
**Best News Story 最佳新闻报道**: **Chua Su Sien 蔡淑贤 – Fire at Hougang 后港大火**
**Best Current Affairs Story 最佳时事报道**: **Chun Guek Lay 曾月丽 – 2006–07 Southeast Asian floods 柔佛州百年水患**

==== Main ceremony ====
| **Best Drama Serial 最佳电视剧**: **Metamorphosis 破茧而出**; The Homecoming 十三鞭; Like Father, Like Daughter 宝贝父女兵; Mars VS Venus 幸福双人床; The Peak 最高点 | **Best Variety Show 最佳综艺节目**: **Say It If You Dare 3 有话好好说3**; Adventure Clicks 代你看世界; Code Red 爱上小红点; I Cook For You 名厨上菜; Star Search 2007 才华横溢出新秀 2007 |
| **Best Variety Special 最佳综艺特备节目**: **Star Awards 2006 红星大奖2006**; Lunar New Year's Eve Special 2007 金猪贺岁庆肥年; Project SuperStar 2 Grand Finals 绝对SuperStar 2 总决赛; Ren Ci Charity Show 2007 仁心慈爱照万千 2007; Thye Hua Kwan Charity Show 2007 一心一德为善乐2007 | **Best Info-ed Programme 最佳资讯节目**: **Find Me a Singaporean 稀游记**; Design Asia 设计达人; History Teller 史迹密码; Simply Overseas 异乡人。新鲜事; Tuesday Report: Out of Bounds 星期二特写之闲人免进 |
| **Best Actor 最佳男主角**: **Zheng Geping 郑各评 – Like Father, Like Daughter 宝贝父女兵**; Chen Hanwei 陈汉玮 – House of Joy 欢乐满屋; Tay Ping Hui 郑斌辉 – Mars VS Venus 幸福双人床; Qi Yuwu 戚玉武 – The Peak 最高点; Zhang Yaodong 张耀栋 – The Greatest Love of All 爱。特别的你 | **Best Actress 最佳女主角**: **Yvonne Lim 林湘萍 – Metamorphosis 破茧而出**; Huang Bi Ren 黄碧仁 – Mars VS Venus 幸福双人床; Ivy Lee 李锦梅 – House of Joy 欢乐满屋; Jesseca Liu 刘芷绚 – Kinship I 手足I; Joanne Peh 白薇秀 – Like Father, Like Daughter 宝贝父女兵 |
| **Best Supporting Actor 最佳男配角**: **Darren Lim 林明伦 – Kinship I 手足I**; Nick Shen 沈炜竣 – Like Father, Like Daughter 宝贝父女兵; Cavin Soh 苏智诚 – Mars vs Venus 幸福双人床; Brandon Wong 黄炯耀 – The Homecoming 十三鞭; San Yow 姚玟隆 – Happily Ever After 凡间新仙人 | **Best Supporting Actress 最佳女配角**: **May Phua 潘竖卿 – Mars vs Venus 幸福双人床**; Huang Hui 黄慧 – The Greatest Love of All 爱。特别的你; Eelyn Kok 郭蕙雯 – Kinship I 手足I; Ezann Lee 李之仪 – Making Miracles 奇迹; Jacqueline Sue 徐艳玲 – Like Father, Like Daughter 宝贝父女兵 |
| **Best Variety Show Host 最佳综艺主持人**: **Mark Lee 李国煌 – Say It if You Dare 3 有话好好说3**; Guo Liang 郭亮 – Lead Me On 贤人指路; Quan Yi Fong 权怡凤 – King of Thrift Smart 省钱王; Cavin Soh 苏智诚 – Where the Queue Starts 2 排排站，查查看2; Bryan Wong 王禄江 – Home Décor Survivor 2 摆家乐2 | **Best Newcomer 最佳新人**: **Pornsak**; Nathaniel Ho 鹤天赐; Kang Cheng Xi 江承熹; Tang Lingyi 汤灵伊; Jacqueline Sue 徐艳玲 |
| **Best News / Current Affairs Presenter 最佳新闻播报/时事主持人**: **Tung Soo Hua 董素华**; Lin Chi Yuan 林启元; Ng Siew Leng 黄秀玲; Wang Zheng 王征; Zhao Wenbei 赵文蓓 | **Young Talent Award 青苹果奖**: **Kyle Chan 陈星余 – The Greatest Love of All 爱。特别的你**; Fang Rong 符芳榕 – The Greatest Love of All 爱。特别的你; Jarren Ho 何俊扬 – The Homecoming 十三鞭; Gabriel Lee 李正豪 – The Greatest Love of All 爱。特别的你; Damus Lim 林俊豪 – Mars VS Venus 幸福双人床 |
**Best Theme Song 最佳主题曲**: **Tay Ping Hui 郑斌辉 – Honour and Passion 宝家卫国 – 《跟着我一起》**; A-do 阿杜 – Kinship 手足 – 《逃离》; Sing Chew 石欣卉 – The Greatest Love of All 爱。特别的你 – 《多一点爱》; Jeff Wang 王建復 – The Homecoming 十三鞭 – 《风的肩膀》; Jeff Wang 王建復 – The Peak 最高点 – 《并肩的方向》

==== Viewership awards ====
**Top 10 Highest Viewership Local Dramas in 2007 十大最高收视录电视剧**
1. The Golden Path 黄金路
2. Like Father, Like Daughter 宝贝父女兵
3. Honour and Passion 宝家卫国
4. Mars VS Venus 幸福双人床
5. Metamorphosis 破茧而出
6. Dear, Dear Son-in-Law 女婿当家
7. The Peak 最高点
8. Switched! 幸运星
9. Live Again 天堂鸟
10. The Greatest Love of All 爱。特别的你
**Top-rated Variety Programme 最高收视率综艺节目**
- Home Decor Survivor (season 2) 摆家乐2

=== Popularity awards ===
| Note | Description |
|---|---|
| | Made it to top 10 in the week / Fall under the Top n category. |
| n | How many of this awards the awardee got. |
| **10** | To be awarded the All-Time Favourite Artiste in the next Star Awards. |

| Stage: | Top 10 |
**Top 10 Most Popular Male Artistes 十大最受欢迎男艺人**
| Zhang Yao Dong 张耀栋 | 1 |
| Huang Wen Yong 黄文永 | |
| Chen Hanwei 陈汉玮 | |
| Marcus Chin 陈建彬 | |
| Guo Liang 郭亮 | |
| Dasmond Koh 许振荣 | 5 |
| Mark Lee 李国煌 | 9 |
| Henry Thia 程旭辉 | |
| Pierre Png 方展发 | |
| Bryan Wong 王禄江 | 5 |
| Gurmit Singh 葛米星 | 5 |
| Edmund Chen 陈之财 | 7 |
| Shaun Chen 陈泓宇 | |
| Jeff Wang 王建復 | |
| Christopher Lee 李铭顺 | 9 |
| Terence Cao 曹国辉 | |
| Adrian Pang 彭耀顺 | |
| Tay Ping Hui 郑斌辉 | 7 |
| Qi Yuwu 戚玉武 | 4 |
| Elvin Ng 黄俊雄 | 2 |
**Top 10 Most Popular Female Artistes 十大最受欢迎女艺人**
| Patricia Mok | |
| Kym Ng | 4 |
| Hong Hui Fang | |
| Xiang Yun 向云 | 8 |
| Dawn Yeoh 姚懿珊 | |
| Vivian Lai 赖怡伶 | 4 |
| Jesseca Liu 刘芷绚 | 2 |
| Ivy Lee 李锦梅 | 6 |
| Quan Yi Fong 权怡凤 | 3 |
| Rui En 芮恩 | 3 |
| Felicia Chin 陈凤玲 | 2 |
| Jeanette Aw 欧萱 | |
| Joanne Peh 白薇秀 | |
| Huang Biren 黄碧仁 | **10** |
| Pan Ling Ling 潘玲玲 | |
| Michelle Chong 庄米雪 | |
| Priscelia Chan 曾诗梅 | |
| Michelle Chia 谢韵仪 | 4 |
| Yvonne Lim 林湘萍 | |
| Fiona Xie 谢宛谕 | |

== Presenters and performers ==
The following individuals presented awards or performed musical numbers.

=== 25th Drama Anniversary ===
| Artistes / Special guests | Presented / Performed |
|---|---|
| Cast of selected dramas | Performed a medley of songs: "雾锁南洋", "逍遥游", "边缘少年", "沉默的羔羊", "红头巾", "新兵小传", "飞跃巅峰" and "情感联络站" |
| Power Station | Performed a medley of songs: "我吃得起苦", "还隐隐作痛" and "那就这样吧" |
| Eric Moo | Performed "遗忘过去"， "情谊藏心底" and "情感联络站" |
| Campus SuperStar contestants: Gao Meigui 高美贵; Benjamin Hum 范平庚; Khim Ng 黄韵琴; Stella Seah; Shawn Tok; Teresa Tseng | Performed "早安老师" |
| Carrie Yeo 杨佳盈 | Performed "红头巾" |
| Lydia Tan 陈迪雅 | Performed "触摸" |
| Judy Teng 邓雪华; Maggie Teng 邓妙华; Jeni Teng 邓桂华 | Performed "快乐密码" |
| Tay Ping Hui; Fann Wong | Performed "别让情两难" |
| Former Singapore Broadcasting Corporation Director-general; Jiang Long 江龙 | Gave out Evergreen Veterans award (Huang and Yun) |
| Former Singapore Broadcasting Corporation Director-general; Leung Lap Yan 梁立人 | Gave out Evergreen Veterans award (Chen and Li) |
| Irene Bai 白言; Cecilia Chen 陈美光 | Delivered monologue and speech for winners of Evergreen Veterans |
| CEO, MediaCorp; Lucas Chow 周永强 | Gave out My Favourite Actress award |
| Former Singapore Broadcasting Corporation Assistant-Chairman; Cheng Tong Fatt 郑东发 | Gave out awards for Top Five Favourite Dramas |

=== Main show ===
| Artistes / Special guests | Presented / Performed |
|---|---|
| Elliot Ngok; Tien Lie 恬妮 | Presented Best Drama Serial |
| Jack Neo; Nono | Presented Best Variety Programme |
| Nono; Sally Wu 吴小莉; Zhu Jun | Presented Best Variety Special |
| Chen Liping; Ming Dao | Presented Best Supporting Actress |
| Kim Jeong-hoon; Zoe Tay | Presented Best Supporting Actor |
| 5566 | Presented Best Newcomer |
| CEO, TVBS Wireless Channel; Young Ming 杨鸣 | Presented Best News / Current Affairs Presenter |
| Show Lo | Performed "一枝独秀" |
| Jack Neo; Sally Wu 吴小莉; Zhu Jun | Presented Best Variety Show Host |
| Elliot Ngok 岳华 | Presented Best Actress |
| Vivian Chow | Presented Best Actor |
| 183 Club | Presented Top 10 Most Favourite Female Artistes |
| Show Lo; Fann Wong | Presented Top 10 Most Favourite Male Artistes |

== Accolades ==
The first show (25th Drama Anniversary) was nominated for the Best Variety Special in the 2009 ceremony, but lost to MediaCorp 45th Anniversary Gala (45载光芒8方贺台庆).

| Year | Award | Accolade | Representative work | Result |
|---|---|---|---|---|
| 2009 | Star Awards | Best Variety Special 最佳综艺特备节目 | Star Awards 2007– 25th Drama Anniversary 红星大奖之戏剧情牵25 | Nominated |
