= Mars vs Venus =

Singaporean Chinese drama series

- Poster
- 幸福双人床
- Genre: Modern Romance, Drama
- Created by: 刘佳岚
- Written by: 洪夕、廖素馨
- Directed by: 张龙敏、黄芬菲、郭慧琦
- Starring: Tay Ping Hui; Huang Biren; Pierre Png; Jesseca Liu
- Opening theme: "幸福双人床" by Chew Sin Huey
- Ending theme: "Would You Be There" by Redwan Ali
- Country of origin: Singapore
- Original language: Chinese
- No. of episodes: 20

Production
- Producer: 李宁强
- Running time: approx. 45 minutes

Original release
- Network: MediaCorp
- Release: May 1 – May 28, 2007

Related
- Pillow Talk

Mars vs Venus (Simplified Chinese: 幸福双人床) is a Singaporean Chinese drama which was telecast on Singapore's free-to-air channel, MediaCorp TV Channel 8. It made its debut on 1 May 2007 and ended its run on 28 May 2007. It was screened on every weekday night, 9pm. This drama serial consists of 20 episodes. The name of this show refers to the book Men Are from Mars, Women Are from Venus by John Gray.

The theme of the drama is mainly to showcase the differences between the two sexes. The show consists of four different couples, each having relationship problems. They are played by, namely: Tay Ping Hui and Huang Biren, Pierre Png and Jesseca Liu, Cavin Soh and May Phua, Chen Tianwen and Aileen Tan.

This show is the third Highest Rated Drama Series for Year 2007.

== Cast ==
=== Main cast ===
- Tay Ping Hui as Steven 刘一凡
- Huang Biren as Xie Wen Jing 谢文静
  Many executive producers of MediaCorp have hinted that Huang Biren was a potential Best Actress Award winner for the Star Awards 2007 for this show due to the interesting role she acted as. She acted as a fierce, naggy and fat housewife for the first time in her 20-year career.
- Pierre Png as William 李威联
- Jesseca Liu as Zi Ling 翁紫玲

=== Supporting cast ===
- May Phua as Carmen 苏丽梅
- Cavin Soh as Hanns 吴国汉
- Aileen Tan as Li Yu Lian 李玉莲
- Li Yinzhu as Ya Yu 雅玉
- Chen Tianwen as Ni Kui Li (Ah Wu) (阿呜)
- Le Yao 乐姚 as Ai Mei 爱美
- Ye Shi Pin as Ren Chun
- Damus Lim Jun Hao 林俊豪 as Wen Wen
- Regene Lim Yong Yi 林詠谊 as Fang Fang

== Synopsis ==
=== Steven (Tay Ping Hui) VS Wen Jing (Huang Bi Ren) ===
They got married in a haste because Wenjing was pregnant. Because of that, they were forced to stay together. Lack of understanding for each other, they are constantly arguing. Though there was constant arguing, they managed to keep their marriage going for 8 years and they have 1 daughter named Fang Fang, and 1 son named Wen Wen. Their marriage ends up in a divorce with the constant interference from Steven's mother (Li Yin Zhu), who hopes to find a better wife for her son in his ex-girlfriend, Aimei (Le Yao). After knowing that Aimei is a bad woman who abused Wen Wen, Steven decided to break up with Aimei once again and begs Wenjing for forgiveness and he hopes to go back to her. Would Wenjing forgive him?

=== Willian (Pierre Png) VS Zi Ling (Jesseca Liu) ===
William and Ziling are happy newly-weds who turned unhappy all too soon when reality sets in. A stay-home wife, Ziling became bored eventually while William refuses to let her go to work. Carmen, who is Ziling's best friend, then gets jealous of Ziling and decides to test their relationship by seducing William. Their marriage is further put to test when William gets to know that he is infertile (low sperm count), which would greatly reduce the chances of Ziling getting pregnant. Would their marriage be able to withstand the various problems posed?

=== Hanns (Cavin Soh) VS Carman (May Phua) ===
Carmen had a womanizer rich husband who died, while Hanns's fiancee eloped with another man while they were on honeymoon. Because of that, both had great distrust for the opposite sex and are often at loggerheads with each other, but soon get along with each other and became friends. They unwittingly fell in love but can they ever trust each other?

=== Yu Lian (Aileen Tan) VS Ah Wu (Chen Tian Wen) ===
Forty-year-old Yu Lian is the boss of a dessert shop, Yu Lian's Dessert Shop while Ah Wu is a big boss of the Pavi brand shoe company. Yu Lian has only had a single time of love life in her whole life. As such, Yu Lian is always envious of women who have plenty of boyfriends around them. Little did she know that Ah Wu is a secret admirer of her, until it was a little too late...

== Viewership ratings ==
This drama series has recorded one of the highest viewership ratings of Year 2007 to date. Ranking at 3rd position for Year 2007.

Week	Episode	Date	Average Number of audience in 5 weekdays (Round off to nearest thousand)
Week 1	Episodes 1 to 4	1 May 2007 to 4 May 2007	616, 000
Week 2	Episodes 5 to 9	7 May 2007 to 11 May 2007	656, 000
Week 3	Episodes 10 to 14	14 May 2007 to 18 May 2007	703, 000
Week 4	Episodes 15 to 19	21 May 2007 to 25 May 2007	751, 000
Last episode	Episode 20	28 May 2007	842, 000 (Peaking at 1.02 million)

== Awards and nominations ==
This drama had received the most number of nominations in the Star Awards 2007 with a total of six nominations.

Year	Award	Category	Recipients (if any)	Result	Ref
2007	Star Awards	Best Screenplay Award	—N/a	Won	
2007	Star Awards	Best Director Award	Chong Liung Man	Won	
2007	Star Awards	Young Talent Award	Damus Lim 林俊豪	Nominated	
2007	Star Awards	Best Actor	Tay Ping Hui	Nominated	
2007	Star Awards	Best Actress	Huang Biren	Nominated	
2007	Star Awards	Best Supporting Actor	Cavin Soh	Nominated	
2007	Star Awards	Best Supporting Actress	May Phua	Won	
2007	Star Awards	Best Drama Serial	—N/a	Nominated	
2007	Asian Television Awards	Best Actress	Huang Biren	Nominated	
