= Zhang Yaodong =

Malaysian actor based in Singapore (born 1977)

- Born: Teoh Yeow Tong; 17 December 1977 (age 48); Kuala Lumpur, Malaysia
- Other name: Qrios
- Education: University of Hertfordshire
- Occupations: Actor; businessman; model; Amateur Singer
- Years active: 2001–present
- Agent: The Celebrity Agency (????-2025)
- Children: 2
- Awards: Full list

Chinese name
- Traditional Chinese: 張耀棟
- Simplified Chinese: 张耀栋
- Hanyu Pinyin: Zhāng Yàodòng
- Jyutping: Zoeng1 Jiu6 Dung3
- Hokkien POJ: Tiuⁿ Iāu-tòng
- Tâi-lô: Tiunn Iāu-tòng

Zhang Yaodong (born Teoh Yeow Tong on 17 December 1977) is a Malaysian actor and businessman based in Singapore.

== Career ==
=== Acting career ===
Zhang entered the entertainment industry after finishing first runner-up in the Malaysian edition of talent-search contest Star Search in 2001. He was previously a model and had done various commercials in Malaysia before joining MediaCorp. He made his small screen debut in the sixth season of popular sitcom, Don't Worry, Be Happy.

After seven years in the industry, Zhang was awarded his first lead role in Happily Ever After. He has since played lead roles in series such as The Greatest Love of All, Your Hand in Mine and several Malaysian co-productions. He has been dubbed by many as the "Chinese Michael Jackson" as he bears a strong resemblance to the late singer.

In the Star Awards 2007, Zhang won the Top 10 Most Popular Male Artistes award, his first award in his acting career and was also nominated for the Best Actor Award, his first ever nomination in the acting category. Zhang won the Top 10 award once again in 2010. In his speech, he thanked veteran artistes and mentors Huang Wenyong, Huang Biren and Chen Hanwei.

Zhang left MediaCorp in mid-2012 as he chose not to renew his contract with his last work being the 2012 anniversary drama Joys of Life. He planned to further his career in China but did not rule out a possibility of returning to MediaCorp. He signed a new contract with Mediacorp in 2015 and has since starred in Mind Game as well as long-running drama Life - Fear Not.

Zhang has won 6 Top 10 Most Popular Male Artistes in 2007, 2011–2013, 2016 and 2024 respectively.

In 2025, after revealing he had two daughters, Zhang was not longer employed by Mediacorp. Zhang was nominated for Top 10 Most Popular Male Artistes for the 2025 Star Awards despite leaving Mediacorp and had no media presence. However, as he had performed in an eligible programme within the qualifying period (2024), he remained a valid nominee for public voting categories.

=== Business career ===
Zhang with fellow Mediacorp actor, Terence Cao, opened a stall, Restoran Selayang, selling roast meat in SIngapore. Zhang also opened a Taiwanese beef noodles restaurant, Niu Taste, in Kuala Lumpur, Malaysia. Both had since closed down. In 2017, Zhang with three other partners, two of whom are Vietnamese, opened a Japanese-Vietnamese fusion restaurant, Maru, in Tanjong Pagar, Singapore. The restaurant had since been closed also.

In 2019, Zhang in an interview, said he had pulled out of all his eateries due to his busy filming commitment.

In 2025, Zhang owned a seafood zi char stall l in a Tampines Industrial Park coffee shop.

== Personal life ==
Zhang's parents were from Selayang, Selangor in Malaysia and were hawkers. Zhang's hometown is Kuala Lumpur.

In 2024, Zhang revealed he has two daughters.

== Filmography ==
=== Television series ===
Year	Title	Role	Notes	Ref.
2002	Don't Worry Be Happy VI (敢敢做个开心人)			
2002	The Vagrant	Gan Yuan		
2002	Beautiful Connection	Sam		
2003	True Heroes	Peter		
2003	Holland V	Ying Tianyang		
2003	Always on My Mind (无炎的爱)			
2004	The Crime Hunters			
2004	An Ode to Life	Zhang Wenxi		
2004	Beautiful Trio			
2004	A Child's Hope II	Huang Pinde		
2004	My Mighty-in-Laws	Ding Mu		
2005	Portrait of Home	Lin Dajiang		
2005	Love Concierge (爱的掌门人)	Sunny		
2006	Measure of Man	Norman		
2006	C.I.D	Wu Guoxiong		
2007	Dear, Dear Son-in-Law	Jiang Junji		
2007	Falling in Love	Tom Hang		
2007	The Greatest Love of All	Zhao Jiaxuan		
2007	Happily Ever After	Wu Gang		
2008	Crime Busters x 2	Yu Qing		
2008	Love Blossoms	Machi Ma Daji		
2008	Where the Heart Is	Hong Jiakang		
2009	Your Hand in Mine	Yue Guang		
2010	The Score	Luo Shunbang		
2010	The Best Things In Life	Bai Chuanyi		
2011	On the Fringe	Leo		
2011	Be Happy	Cheng Fang		
2011	A Tale of 2 Cities	Ouyang Ming		
2012	Joys of Life	Qian Yiduo		
2012	Double Bonus	Jin Junyang		
2013	Disclosed	Lin Feng		
2013	Love At Risk	Wang Li'an		
2015	Life - Fear Not	Liu Yishou		
2015	Mind Game	Guo Yongyan		
2016	Hero	Zhang Zhentian		
2016	C.L.I.F. 4	Chen Yu		
2016	My First School	Weng Zhihao		
2016	Beyond Words	Gao Lixian		
2017	Eat Already? 2	Dehua		
2017	118 II	Wang Zhipeng		
2018	Heart To Heart (心点心)	Zhou Gangsheng		
2018	Blessings 2 (祖先保佑2)	Liu Saiding		
2018	Blessings 2 (祖先保佑2)	Liu Qingshan		
2018	Gifted	Li Xiaoyi		
2019	Daybreak (天空渐渐亮)	Zheng Weilong		
2019	All Is Well – Singapore (你那边怎样，我这边OK)	Cai Fulai		
2019	Dear Neighbours (我的左邻右里)	He Weiren		
2020	A Jungle Survivor (森林生存记）	Guo Dahua		
2021	Leave No Soul Behind (21点灵)	Feng Degang		
2021	Live Your Dreams (大大的梦想)	Li Weicheng		
2021	Soul Old Yet So Young (心里住着老灵魂)	Cai Zhenye		
2021	Mind Jumper (触心罪探)	Huang Runze		
2021	Watch Out! Alexius (小心啊！谢宇航)	Xie Yuhang		
2022	Sisters Stand Tall (快跑吧, 丽娇)	Li Zheyi		
2022	Healing Hands (医生不是神)	Wen Bo'an		
2023	Fix My Life	Yang Feifan		
2023	Family Ties	Aoki		
2023	My One and Only	Lucas Low		
2023	Stranger in the Dark	Mr Luo		
2024	Born to Shine (孺子可教也)	Woo Shangjin		

=== Films ===
Year	Title	Role	Notes	Ref.
2024	Oversteer	Tony		

== Awards and nominations ==
Year	Ceremony	Category	Nominated work	Result	Ref
2007	Star Awards	Best Actor	The Greatest Love of All (as Zhao Jiaxuan)	Nominated	
2007	Star Awards	Top 10 Most Popular Male Artistes	—N/a	Won	
2009	Star Awards	Top 10 Most Popular Male Artistes	—N/a	Nominated	
2010	Star Awards	Top 10 Most Popular Male Artistes	—N/a	Won	
2011	Star Awards	Top 10 Most Popular Male Artistes	—N/a	Won	
2012	Star Awards	Top 10 Most Popular Male Artistes	—N/a	Won	
2014	Star Awards	Most Popular Regional Artiste (Cambodia)	—N/a	Nominated	
2016	Star Awards	Top 10 Most Popular Male Artistes	—N/a	Top 10	
2017	Star Awards	Top 10 Most Popular Male Artistes	—N/a	Nominated	
2019	Star Awards	Top 10 Most Popular Male Artistes	—N/a	Nominated	
2020	Asian Academy Award	Best Actor	Daybreak (as Zeng Weilong)	Won	
2021	Star Awards	Best Actor	Daybreak (as Zeng Weilong)	Nominated	
2021	Star Awards	Top 10 Most Popular Male Artistes	—N/a	Nominated	
2022	Star Awards	Top 10 Most Popular Male Artistes	—N/a	Nominated	
2023	Star Awards	Top 10 Most Popular Male Artistes	—N/a	Nominated	
2024	Star Awards	Top 10 Most Popular Male Artistes	—N/a	Won	
2025	Star Awards	Top 10 Most Popular Male Artistes	—N/a	Nominated	
