= The Homecoming (TV series) =

- 十三鞭
- Genre: Suspense
- Starring: Li Nanxing; Rayson Tan; Constance Song
- Opening theme: 《风的肩膀》 sung by Jeff Wang
- Country of origin: Singapore
- Original language: Chinese
- No. of episodes: 20

Production
- Running time: approx. 45 minutes

Original release
- Network: MediaCorp
- Release: 3 April – 30 April 2007

The Homecoming (Chinese: 十三鞭; literally: Thirteen Strokes) is a Singaporean Chinese TV drama series telecast on MediaCorp TV Channel 8. It made its debut on 3 April 2007 and ended its run on 30 April 2007. The series ran for a total of 20 episodes. Several of the cast had also appeared in The Undisclosed, which aired in 2006.

== Cast ==
=== Main cast ===
- Li Nanxing as Dong Weihong
- Constance Song as Sessy
- Rayson Tan as Chen Hanyuan

=== Supporting cast ===
- Zheng Geping as Huang Zhenfa
- Vivian Lai as Qianyi
- Brandon Wong as Lai Guoqiang
- Ye Shipin as Ah Long Jiu
- Ong Ai Leng as Sandy

== Synopsis ==
Dong Weihong returns to Singapore from the US with his nine-year-old son, Ryan. He catches up with his old buddies Chen Hanyuan, Lai Quoqiang and Huang Zhenfa to reminisce their past friendships. Weihong, who is currently unemployed, helps out in Zhenfa's automobile business while Hanyuan is a successful lawyer and Guoqiang earns a living by being a professional "scapegoat" for criminals. Before long, old feelings of betrayal start brewing among them when they recall their past.

The four friends were convicted of arson and sentenced to imprisonment and caning several years ago. Weihong, Guoqiang and Zhenfa each received three strokes of the cane while Hanyuan received four strokes. He was the one who instigated his friends to commit arson and that effectively made him the mastermind. However, no one else will know the truth unless one of his three friends have betrayed him during the investigation. Hanyuan is deeply traumatised by the experience and vowed to find out who betrayed him. In order to take his revenge, Hanyuan resorts to unscrupulous means and causes harm to those around him.

A complex love relationship develops between Hanyuan, Sessy, Weihong and Qianyi. Qianyi is a childhood friend of Weihong and has been in love with him for a long time but Weihong does not reciprocate. Hanyuan and Sessy are married and Weihong's return threatens their marriage as Sessy still has some feelings for Weihong. As his mind slowly deranges, Hanyuan begins to suspect his wife and Weihong and believes that Weihong is the one who betrayed him.

== Reception ==
=== Viewership Ratings ===
Week	Date	Average Number of audience in 5 weekdays (Rounded to the nearest thousand)
Week 1	3 April 2007 to 6 April 2007	582, 000
Week 2	9 April 2007 to 13 April 2007	596, 000
Week 3	16 April 2007 to 20 April 2007	621, 000
Week 4	23 April 2007 to 27 April 2007	635, 000
Last episode	30 April 2007	672, 000

== Accolades ==
Organisation	Year	Category	Recipient(s)	Result	Ref.
Star Awards	2007	Best Supporting Actor	Brandon Wong	Nominated	
Star Awards	2007	Young Talent Award	Jarren Ho 何俊扬	Nominated	
Star Awards	2007	Best Drama Serial	—N/a	Nominated	
Star Awards	2007	Best Theme Song	"风的肩膀"	Nominated	
Star Awards	2007	Top 10 Villains	Rayson Tan	Won	
