= The Undisclosed =

- 迷云二十天
- Genre: Modern Suspense
- Starring: Li Nanxing; Huang Biren; Constance Song
- Country of origin: Singapore
- Original language: Chinese
- No. of episodes: 20

Production
- Running time: approx. 45 minutes

Original release
- Network: MediaCorp
- Release: April 3 – April 28, 2006

Related
- Patrol (1989); Beyond the Axis of Truth (2001); True Heroes (2003); The Crime Hunters (2004); Zero to Hero (2005); C.I.D. (2006); Metamorphosis (2007); Crime Busters x 2 (2008); Unriddle (2010); Unriddle 2 (2012); C.L.I.F. (2011); C.L.I.F. 2 (2013); C.L.I.F. 3 (2014); C.L.I.F. 4 (2016); C.L.I.F. 5 (2019)

The Undisclosed (Chinese: 迷云二十天) is an action-thriller suspense drama produced by Mediacorp TV Channel 8. The drama made its debut on 3 April 2006 in Singapore, and ended its run on 28 April 2006.

This is the first drama Li Nanxing acted in after his divorce with ex-actress Yang Libing.

This drama was ranked 9th on the viewership ratings chart for Year 2006, while Li Nanxing won the Best Actor award in the Star Awards 2006 for his role in this drama.

The series was repeated from 16 June 2008 at every weekday night, 11pm on MediaCorp TV Channel 8.

== Story ==
Carol (Ong Ai Leng), who works in a bank in Hong Kong, returns to Shang City to throw her wedding dinner after her marriage to a Hong Konger, Superintendent Cheng Musheng (Li Nanxing) in Hong Kong. She disappears on the 2nd day of her return after meeting up with her longtime buddy, Rachel (Constance Song). Yan Kexin (Huang Biren), a detective who knew Carol in their university days, volunteers to take on the case and devotes all her time to locate the missing Carol. Meanwhile, Musheng also embark on a relentless search for his fiancée with the help of Rachel.

During the investigation, Kexin discovers that there may be a plot against Carol by her stepmother, Zeng Bixing and her son Zeng Tianci (Andrew Seow), due to a will left behind by Carol's mother. Musheng also discovers that members of a secret society headed by a triad boss Longtou (Zhu Houren), are also looking for Carol. Just then, someone claims to have spotted Carol. Does this mean that Carol is still alive? Why did she pull a disappearing act? Did she concoct and set up her own disappearance and how did she get herself involved with the secret society? How did Longtou always manage to stay a step ahead of police raids? Was CIB compromised? Is there a mole in the police department investigating Carol's disappearance?

The case becomes more intriguing when Carol's dismembered body was discovered. With the combined efforts of Kexin and Musheng, both of them begun to unravel the evil mysteries revolving around Carol's disappearance.

== Cast ==
=== Main cast ===
- Li Nanxing as Cheng Mu Sheng
- Huang Biren as Yan Ke Xin
- Constance Song as Rachel

=== Supporting cast ===
- Ong Ai Leng as Carol
- Andrew Seow as Zeng Tian Ci
- Zhu Houren as Longtou
- Rayson Tan as CK Chong
- Huang Shinan as Ivan
- Brandon Wong as Raymond
- Kyle Chan as Roy
- Chen Guohua as An-ge
- Weng Xing'ang as Steven

== Awards and nominations ==
Accolade	Award	Nominee	Result
Star Awards 2006 Show 2 红星大奖 2006 下半场	Best Supporting Actor 最佳男配角	Rayson Tan 陈泰铭	Nominated
Star Awards 2006 Show 2 红星大奖 2006 下半场	Best Actor 最佳男主角	Li Nanxing 李南星	Won

== Trivia ==
The style of The Undisclosed has similarities to the American action show, 24.

== See also ==
- List of programmes broadcast by Mediacorp Channel 8
