= The Crime Hunters =

- 心网追凶
- Genre: Police procedural Thriller
- Starring: Edmund Chen; Xie Shaoguang; Aileen Tan; Yao Wenlong
- Opening theme: 走火入魔 by Tay Ping Hui
- Country of origin: Singapore
- Original language: Chinese
- No. of episodes: 20

Production
- Producer: Winnie Wong 王尤红
- Running time: approx. 45 minutes per episode

Original release
- Network: MediaCorp Channel 8
- Release: January 2004 – February 2004

Related
- Patrol (1989); Beyond the Axis of Truth (2001); True Heroes (2003); Zero to Hero (2005); The Undisclosed (2006); C.I.D. (2006); Metamorphosis (2007); Crime Busters x 2 (2008); Unriddle (2010); Unriddle 2 (2012); C.L.I.F. (2011); C.L.I.F. 2 (2013); C.L.I.F. 3 (2014); C.L.I.F. 4 (2016); C.L.I.F. 5 (2019)

The Crime Hunters (心网追凶) is a Singaporean Chinese police procedural drama which was broadcast in 2004. Unlike other police procedural dramas produced by Mediacorp, this series was focused more on forensic investigators rather than police officers.

== Plot ==
Bai Ce is an experienced CID officer who is well known for his eccentricity and brilliance and his team consists of CNA and "Uncle Wang". Much to their surprise, rookie officer Lan Tinghui, a recent university law graduate who changed careers, is assigned as their superior. His appointment is met with scepticism from the team and causes some friction. Together with criminal psychologist Fang Jiesi, they tackle five difficult cases.

A nurse Pan Yu'e was found murdered in her HDB flat. Evidence points to one of Bai Ce's former suspects from three years ago, a dangerous murderer who went by the nickname "Crazy Wolf". However, "Crazy Wolf" has been locked away in a psychiatric hospital all this time. Could there be a copycat killer on the loose, or did "Crazy Wolf" have something up his sleeve?

Tinghui's cousin Jingyun is found dead with her throat slashed. Recently, she had been having conflicts with her estranged husband Guoquan over his debts and refused to forgive him despite his desperate pleas. Another suspect is her colleague David, whom Jiesi had witnessed threatening Jingyun.

A pair of corpses, a man and a woman, are found at a marina. The man is identified as Mr Luo, boss of his own construction company, while the woman remains unidentified. The team are led to the Luos' son Alvin but suspect that perhaps there is more to the case than just patricide. To make matters worse, Mrs Luo is later taken hostage.

Just when the Luos' case is closed, the team is assigned to another complex murder case. Cultural centre head Mr Pan and his wife are found brutally murdered in their own home and the only witness is their traumatised six-year-old adopted son Wencong. Investigations hit a snag when Wencong's sister Sherry objects to her brother being questioned for fear of him being traumatised even more.

A murder of actress Wen Huiya is reported but when police arrive, the body was already missing. Huiya was suffering from mental illness and evidence does not match up. On closer inspection, the team realise that this case bears similarities with an old unsolved rape-cum-murder case and suspect that the perpetrators are the same. The stakes are raised when their psychiatrist friend Xiao Ziying is murdered and her murderer unabashedly challenges the police to rescue his hostage. Will they be able to capture this elusive criminal and the hostage before time runs out?

== Cast ==
Cast	Role
Edmund Chen	Lan Tinghui 蓝霆晖
Xie Shaoguang	Bai Ce 白则
Aileen Tan	Fang Jiesi 方洁思
Yao Wenlong	"CNA"
Li Wenhai	Uncle Wang 旺叔

=== Other cast ===
Cast	Role
Pan Lingling	Dr Xiao Ziying 萧子颖
Richard Low	"Crazy Wolf" 疯狼
Zheng Geping	Zhu Guoquan 朱国权
Chen Huihui	
