= Chen Guohua =

Singaporean actor (born 1959 or 1960)

- Born: Tan Kok Hwa; 1959 or 1960 (age 64–65); Singapore
- Occupation: Actor
- Years active: 1985−present
- Awards: Star Awards 1998 : Best Supporting Actor; Star Awards 2000 : Best Supporting Actor

Chinese name
- Traditional Chinese: 陳國華
- Simplified Chinese: 陈国华
- Hanyu Pinyin: Chén Gúohúa

Tan Kok Hwa (born 1959 or 1960), professionally known as Chen Guohua, is a Singaporean actor and contracted artiste under MediaCorp.

== Career ==
Chen graduated from the Singapore Broadcasting Corporation 5th Year Artiste Training Class. He was trained by veteran theatrical teachers such as Mao Wei, Li Yongxi, Zhu Bingquan and Xia Chuan. Chen was cast in his debut role in the long-running TV series Neighbours in 1986. He won the Best Supporting Actor award twice at the Star Awards in 1998 and 2000.

== Personal life ==
Chen is married. He is a devout Buddhist.

== Filmography ==
=== Film ===
| Year | Title | Role | Notes | Ref. |
|---|---|---|---|---|
| 1995 | Fatal Memory (血案迷情) | Lin Jinmu | Telemovie | |
| 1997 | The Accidental Hero (流氓英雄) | Group leader | Telemovie | |
| 1997 | Hidden Scars (心结) | He Cheng | Telemovie | |
| 2008 | Wherever You Are | | Italian telemovie | |

=== Television series ===
| Year | Title | Role | Notes | Ref. |
|---|---|---|---|---|
| 1985 | The Young Heroes 少年英雄 | Duan Fuguan | | |
| 1986 | Men of Valour 盗日英雄传 | Huang Heng | | |
| 1986 | Samsui Women | Producer / Da Pao | 2 roles | |
| 1986 | Neighbours 芝麻绿豆 | A-Ba | | |
| 1986 | The Bond 天涯同命鸟 | Prosecutor | Cameo | |
| 1988 | Airforce | Zhao's father colleague | | |
| 1989 | A Long Way Home 燃烧岁月 | Li Guohua | Cameo | |
| 1989 | Song of Youth 生活歌手 | Creditor | | |
| 1989 | Patrol | Li Muquan | | |
| 1989 | The Sword Rules 剑断江湖 | Long Chengyun | | |
| 1990 | The Finishing Line 出人头地 | Feng Tai | | |
| 1990 | Wishing Well 幻海奇遇 之《六尺儿童》 | A-Cheng | | |
| 1990 | Imperial Intrigues 大内双宝 | Bai Hu | | |
| 1990 | Enchanted Eyes 天眼 | Zhao Shan | | |
| 1991 | Fatal Endearment 谍海危情 | Weng Zhihua | | |
| 1992 | Women Of Substance 悲欢岁月 | Liang An | | |
| 1992 | A Time To Dance 火舞风云 | He Yafa | | |
| 1992 | My Buddies 浪漫战场 | Xiao Renguo | | |
| 1992 | Between Friends 山水喜相逢 | Director Teng | Cameo | |
| 1992 | The Male Syndrome 妙男正传 | Mr. Jiang | | |
| 1992 | Lady Steel 激情女大亨 | Tian Yongping | | |
| 1992 | Mystery II 迷离夜II 之《是非勿语》 | Zhang Zhi | | |
| 1993 | The Brave One 荡寇英雄 | Lin Bing | | |
| 1993 | Sister Dearest 傻妹俏娇娃 | Gao Ren (Young) 高人（年轻时） | Guest appearance | |
| 1993 | The Great Conspiracy 莲花争霸 | Ren Hailong | | |
| 1993 | The Witty Advisor 金牌师爷 | He Chuan | | |
| 1993 | Heaven's Will 天机风云 | Doctor | Guest appearance | |
| 1994 | Double Life 潇洒走一回 | Gambler | Guest appearance | |
| 1994 | Those Were The Days 生命擂台 | Manager Mr. Xu | | |
| 1994 | Dreams Come True 美梦成真 | Hong Mao | | |
| 1994 | Crazy Duet 叔侄俩疯狂 | Da Ye | | |
| 1994 | Fiery Of Lover 烈火情人 | Cao Jianhong | | |
| 1994 | Against All Odds 共闯荆途 | Manager Mr. Chen | | |
| 1994 | Dr Justice 法医故事 | Yu Guangxiang | | |
| 1994 | The Magnate 叱咤风云 | A Mu | | |
| 1994 | Truly Yours 聪明糊涂心 | A Hua | | |
| 1994 | Silk and Romance 情丝万缕 | Lawyer Mr. Jin | | |
| 1995 | Chronicle of Life 缘尽今生 | A Hai | | |
| 1995 | Deep Within My Heart 爱在心处 | Liang Guangdong | | |
| 1995 | Homes at 168 大牌168 | Lu Dahng | | |
| 1995 | Heartbeat 医胆仁心 | Chen Jialu's elder brother | | |
| 1995 | Secret Files 机密档案 | A Sheng | | |
| 1995 | Heavenly Ghost Catcher 天师钟馗 之《六月雪》 | San Bu Zhen Ren | | |
| 1995 | Morning Express | Deputy chief procurator | | |
| 1995 | The Dragons Five 飞龙五将 | A Tan | | |
| 1995 | The Teochew Family | Xu Laifu | | |
| 1995 | Lady Investigators - The Will 女探三人组 之《遗恨》 | Ah Hua (Zai's Father) | | |
| 1995 | The Golden Pillow | Uncle Ji | | |
| 1995 | Dr Justice II 法医故事II 之《血在烧》 | Rao Yakun | | |
| 1996 | Ah Xue 阿雪 | A Niu | | |
| 1996 | The Legends of Jigong | San Ye | | |
| 1996 | Tales of the City 都市奇情 之《阿秋的春天》 | Yu A-qiu | | |
| 1997 | Living by Night 都市夜归人 | Jian Guohuang | | |
| 1997 | Courting Trouble 婚姻法庭 | Jiang Shiguang | | |
| 1997 | Crimes and Tribulations 狮城奇案录 之《第一个上绞台的女人》 | Xian Guisong | | |
| 1997 | The Price of Peace | Zhang A Da | Nominated for Best Supporting Actor | |
| 1997 | Tales of the City 2 都市奇情2 之《人球》 | Yang Quancai | | |
| 1997 | Tuition Fever 老师总是比我早 | Lin Yisheng | Sitcom | |
| 1998 | Taxi Driver 德士司机 | | | |
| 1998 | Around Peoples' Park 珍珠街坊 | A Qing | Won Best Supporting Actor award at Star Awards | |
| 1998 | My Teacher, Aiyoyo! 哎哟哟奇妙假期 | Wu Xiaolong's father | | |
| 1998 | The Return of the Condor Heroes | Lu Youjiao | | |
| 1998 | Myths and Legends of Singapore 石叻坡传说 之《求子树》 | Zhang A-hai | | |
| 1998 | Living in Geylang 芽笼芽笼 | Yang Keqiang | | |
| 1998 | On the Edge - The Accursed 边缘档案 之《怨天的妇人》 | A-Fa | | |
| 1999 | From the Medical Files 2 医生档案II | Kong Yongxiang | | |
| 1999 | Wok of Life | A Jin / Wu A-tu | | |
| 1999 | My Teacher, My Friend 小岛醒了 | Hong Caishun | | |
| 1999 | Hero of the Times | Murong Yixiao | | |
| 2000 | My Home Affairs 家事 | Zheng Dayong | Won Best Supporting Actor award at Star Awards | |
| 2000 | The Tax Files 流金税月 | Zhao Guang | | |
| 2000 | Dare to Strike 扫冰者 | Yu Bingshun | | |
| 2001 | The Stratagem 世纪攻略 | Xiao Guowen | Special appearance | |
| 2001 | In Pursuit of Peace | Uncle Xi | | |
| 2001 | Heroes in Black 我来也 | Sun Bukuai | | |
| 2001 | The Hotel | Xie Jiehua | | |
| 2002 | Kopi-O II 浓浓咖啡乌 | Shen Jianyi | | |
| 2002 | Springs of Life | Physician Yang | | |
| 2002 | Innocently Guilty 法內有情天 | Brothel boss | | |
| 2003 | Holland V | Liang Ah-huo | | |
| 2003 | True Heroes | Liu Zhenyang | | |
| 2004 | A Child's Hope II 孩有明天 2 | Guo Jinfu | | |
| 2005 | Life of Hope 活下去 | Lin Laifa | | |
| 2005 | Destiny 梦在手里 | Qiu Yicheng | Special appearance | |
| 2005 | The Rainbow Connection 舞出彩虹 | Brother Nengren | | |
| 2005 | NKF Charity Show 2 | | | |
| 2006 | The Undisclosed | Brother An | | |
| 2007 | My Dear Kins 亲本家人 | Chen Dezhong | | |
| 2007 | Making Miracles | Zhang Shizong | Special appearance | |
| 2007 | Honour And Passion | Zhu Rou Qiang | | |
| 2007 | Metamorphosis | Cao Zhongming | | |
| 2007 | One Last Dance | | | |
| 2008 | Our Rice House | An-Ge | | |
| 2008 | Crime Busters x 2 | Ah-Zhu | | |
| 2009 | Table of Glory 乒乓圆 | Fei Mao | | |
| 2010 | New Beginnings | Uncle De | | |
| 2010 | The Family Court | Chen Tianlai | | |
| 2010 | Breakout | Xu Changgen | | |
| 2011 | Devotion | Zheng A-nan | | |
| 2011 | On The Fringe 2 | Shorty Hong | | |
| 2012 | Rescue 995 995 | Xu Shaoxiong | | |
| 2012 | Joys Of Life | Qian Caiguang | | |
| 2012 | Game Plan | Cheng Kun | | |
| 2012 | It Takes Two | Watermelon Ming | | |
| 2013 | Love At Risk | Chicken King | | |
| 2014 | The Journey: Tumultuous Times | Wan Shan | | |
| 2015 | Second Chance | Old Bao | | |
| 2015 | The Journey: Our Homeland | Wan Shan | | |
| 2015 | Life - Fear Not | Bai Jinshan | | |
| 2019 | Hello From The Other Side (阴错阳差) | Ma Erdi | | |

== Awards and nominations ==
Star Awards
| Year | Category | Nominated work | Result |
|---|---|---|---|
| 1997 | Best Supporting Actor | The Price of Peace | Nominated |
| 1998 | Best Supporting Actor | Around People's Park | Won |
| 2000 | Best Supporting Actor | My Home Affairs | Won |
