= Happily Ever After (2007 TV series) =

- Fán jiān xīn xiānrén 凡间新仙人
- Genre: Modern Drama
- Starring: Elvin Ng; Joanne Peh; Fiona Xie; Zhang Yaodong
- Opening theme: 完美的爱情 by Shi Xin Hui & Nat Ho
- Country of origin: Singapore
- Original language: Chinese
- No. of episodes: 20

Production
- Running time: approx. 45 minutes

Original release
- Network: MediaCorp
- Release: 6 February – 5 March 2007

Related
- The Peak; Making Miracles

Happily Ever After (Chinese: 凡间新仙人) is a 20-episode Singaporean Chinese drama which is telecast on Singapore's free-to-air channel, MediaCorp TV Channel 8. It made its debut on 6 February 2007 and ended on 5 March 2007.

This show is unique as it starts off seeming like a period drama but later evolves into a modern setting. There are many references to figures and stories from Chinese mythology and folk tales such as Cowherd and Weaver Girl, Journey to the West and the Eight Immortals. The first episode drew some controversy as it had a scene in which Wu Gang (Zhang Yaodong) and Erlang (Yao Wenlong) faced off in the nude with their private parts blurred on screen.

== Synopsis ==
The series is based on characters and gods from well-known Chinese folk tales and legends and is set in modern times with the mythological characters taking on human incarnations.

The legendary lovers, Cowherd and Weaving Maiden have become lovesick and unable to bear with the pain of seeing each other only once a year. In order to be together forever, they make a plan to escape to the mortal world, but get caught by the guards. The Queen Mother then decides to give them a test; they must reincarnate as new humans and see if fate can bring them together again. After that, the captain of the supreme soldiers holds a strike to dethrone the Jade Emperor and Queen Mother because of their inability to rule the heavens properly; then the Queen Mother and Erlang Shen decide to use the fate of Cowherd and Weaving Maiden as a bet - shall they end up together then the two gods can stay on their thrones, but shall they separate then the two gods will be dethroned.

At the same time, many gods and immortals have fled to the mortal world for different reasons: some have been expelled from the heavens; some have become criminals and are on the run; and to tie in with the main plot, some have been sent down as agents to either bring Cowherd and Weaving Maiden together or to separate them.

Cowherd is reincarnated as Yang Tian Ying, and Weaving Maiden is reincarnated as Wang Tian Qin, both of whom somehow ended up living in Singapore instead of China. Erlang hires the Eight Immortals (With the exception of He Xiangu and Lan Caihe, who remained loyal to the Jade Emperor and Queen Mother) to ruin any chance of the two getting back together, while Queen Mother hires Wu Gang and is secretly assisted by He Xiangu and Lan Caihe, do their utmost to bring Tian Ying and Tian Qin together. The pair for most part of the series was kept in the dark while Erlang Shen and Queen Mother engaged in a power struggle involving their fate. A concurrent subplot involved a love triangle between Wu Gang, Lu Yue (the modern incarnation of Chang Er), and Zhu Wanjin (Zhu Bajie incognito), thus giving Wu Gang his own set of problems. It was revealed mid-way in the series that Wu Gang was a double agent but began having second thoughts. Later on Lu Yue and Zhu Wanjin desired Tian Ying and Tian Qin respectively, and Erlang used them as pawns to get the two to separate. Erlang and Zhu Wanjin intended to kill off Lu Yue and Tian Ying with a bomb but Wu Gang sacrificed his immortality to save both their lives. Under the orders of Queen Mother, Sun Wukong showed up and dragged Zhu Wanjin back to heaven to be punished.

Towards the end of the series, Tian Ying and Tian Qin recovered memories of their past lives and naturally spent their time together, but quickly realized they had little in common other than "loving each other" for the past thousands of years. This turn of events threatened Queen Mother's position on Heaven, causing massive upheavals and almost granting Erlang Shen the supreme control of Heaven. A rapidly aging but repentant Wu Gang reminded the two of their times as mortals. This sparked an epiphany for the pair. They are Tian Ying and Tian Qin, not Cowherd and Weaving Maiden - Their love will not be dictated by the gods nor will the relationship they built together as mortals be determined by their past life, and their resolved romance inadvertently overthrew Erlang Shen and reinstated Queen Mother.

Decades later, Tian Ying and Tian Qin were seen spending their old age together, while reminiscing their old friend Wu Gang who had died with Lu Yue by his side, marking this a "Happily Ever After" ending.

== Cast ==
=== Main cast ===
- Elvin Ng as Yang Tian Ying 杨天鹰 (Modern day name) / Cowherd 牛郎 (Olden Day name)
- Joanne Peh as Wang Tian Qin 王天琴 (Modern day name) / Weaving Maiden 织女 (Olden Day name)
- Fiona Xie as Lu Yue 陆月 (Modern Day name) / Chang Er 嫦娥 (Olden Day name)
- Zhang Yaodong as Wu Gang 吴刚

=== Supporting cast ===
- Chen Liping as Madam Wang 王夫人/Wang Mu Niang Niang 王母娘娘 (Queen Mother)
- San Yow as Yang Jian (Erlangshen) 杨戬 (二朗神)
- Ben Yeo as Zhu Wan Jin 朱万金/Pigsy 猪八戒
- Bryan Wong as Ah Cai 阿采/Lan Caihe 藍采和
- Belinda Lee as Shane/He Xian Gu 何仙姑
- Huang Wenyong as Yu Di 玉帝 (Jade Emperor)
- Jimmy Nah as Xiao Tian Chuan (Celestial Dog), Erlangshen's companion
- Liang Tian as Zhang Guolao 張果老
- Zhang Xinxiang as Lu Dong Bin 呂洞賓
- Huang Shi Nan as God of Fortune
- Rayson Tan as Sun Wukong
- Yan Bingliang as Ah Zhong
- Jin Yinji as Ah Jin
- Muhammad Nurafizi as Cashier
