= The Greatest Love of All (TV series) =

Singaporean television series

- 爱.特别的你
- Genre: Drama series
- Written by: Chen Siew Khoon 陈秀群; Seah Choon Guan 谢俊源
- Starring: Joanne Peh; Zhang Yaodong; Chen Hanwei; Apple Hong; Constance Song
- Opening theme: 多一点爱 by Chew Sin Huey 石欣卉
- Country of origin: Singapore
- Original language: Mandarin (华语)
- No. of episodes: 20

Production
- Producer: Li Ningqiang
- Running time: Approx. 46 minutes

Original release
- Network: MediaCorp TV Channel 8
- Release: 29 May – 25 June 2007

The Greatest Love of All (Chinese: 爱·特别的你) is a Singaporean Chinese drama which was telecast on Singapore's free-to-air channel, MediaCorp Channel 8. It made its debut on 29 May 2007, and ended on 25 June 2007. This drama serial consists of 20 episodes, and was screened on every weekday night at 2100h.

This drama serial mainly showcases cases of children who are autistic and those with dyslexia. Through these cases, the drama hopes to reiterate to the audience to give these children a little more respect and care.

== Cast ==
=== Main cast ===
Cast	Role
Joanne Peh	Luo Wen Xin
Zhang Yaodong	Zhao Jia Xuan
Chen Hanwei	Zhao Jia Ming
Apple Hong	Yang Qian Ru

=== Supporting cast ===
Cast	Role
Ng Hui	Tang Cai Ning
Chen Shucheng	Zhao Zhi Peng
Constance Song	Zhang Ying
Huang Yiliang	Li Ying Xiong
Aileen Tan	Mo Li Hua
Zhang Xinxiang	Hong Jian Ping
Chen Huihui	Chen Xin Lin
Lin Yu Yun	Liu Feng Yi

=== Child cast ===
Cast	Role
Gabriel Lee Zheng Hao	Yong Le
Fang Rong	Kaixin
Kyle Chan Xing Yu	Jiaxi
Zeng Qi Yan	Huanhuan

== Synopsis ==
When Wenxin (Joanne Peh) was a child, she had severe dyslexia and was kept out of all mainstream educational institutions. However, her parents' unfailing love and support gave her the strength to complete her studies and graduate from university. She then becomes a social worker to help more disabled children lead healthy lives.

~

Kaixin (Fu Fangrong) is a little girl with a slightly lower I.Q. and is enrolled into a school for students with special needs. Her parents, Yingxiong (Huang Yiliang) and Lihua (Aileen Tan) are not highly educated and do not know how to cope with a child like her. Furthermore, they are under a lot of pressure because of their financial difficulties, therefore, Wenxin is often quarreling with Kaixin's parents whenever Kaixin fails to attend her classes in school. New counselor Jiaxuan (Zhang Yaodong) thus regards Wenxin as a hot-tempered social worker.

Although Jiaxuan does not agree with Wenxin's way of doing things, he respects her for her undying devotion to her work. After some time of interaction, Wenxin and Jiaxuan begin to develop feelings for each other. However, Wenxin notices that rich girl Caining (Huang Hui) is always around Jiaxuan. Caining even becomes a volunteer because of Jiaxuan. It turns out that Caining is secretly in love with Jiaxuan, although his father Zhipeng (Chen Shucheng) sees her as his elder son Jiaming (Chen Hanwei)'s girlfriend. Wenxin remembers her own medical record and cannot muster enough courage to tackle the prospect of love.

Caining runs a modeling agency and Qianru (Apple Hong) is one of her outstanding models. Many years ago, Qianru was studying overseas and had a boyfriend whom she was going to marry. However, her fiancé was killed in an accident while she gives birth to an autistic daughter, Huanhuan (Zeng Qiyan). Qianru, who only wants the best for her daughter, often loses control and beats Huanhuan while trying to discipline her. Qianru's mother, Fengyi (Lin Liyun) tries to talk her into accepting the fact that Huanhuan is autistic but Qianru is unwilling to face reality. After some time, under Wenxin's patient persuasion, Qianru finally agrees to send Huanhuan to a school for children with special needs.

Qianru gets to know Jiaming during a performance and both have a good impression of each other. Fengyi suggests pretending that Huanhuan is her daughter instead of her granddaughter so that Qianru can pursue her own happiness without any burden. Qianru is caught between kinship and love and feels tormented.

Meanwhile, Jiaxuan's father Zhipeng, who lost his wife a long time ago, gets to know a starlet Zhang Ying (Constance Song) overseas and they had a child together. The child Jiaxi (Kyle Chan) is born deaf and dumb, and has a cleft lip. Zhipeng, a manufacturer of branded attire, is afraid of ruining his reputation, and so forbids Zhang Ying from letting others know about Jiaxi. Zhang Ying overly protects her son, and he ends up being very dependent on her and unable to communicate with people.

Under Jiaxuan and Wenxin's persuasion, Zhang Ying finally changes her attitude and sends Jiaxi to the school for children with special needs. Qianru intends to reveal Huanhuan's true identity to Jiaming. At the same time, Zhipeng finds out that Jiaxi has been attending classes at the special school. He is outraged and creates a big fuss. Therefore, Qianru is still unable to tell Jiaming the truth.

Huanhuan feels that her mother has become more distant to her. One day, she disappears after school. Qianru experiences the fear of losing her daughter for the first time and panics. Qianru looks everywhere for Huanhuan, and is touched when she finally hears Huanhuan calling her "Mother". She finally decides that she will give up everything for the sake of her child.

Caining discovers that Jiaxuan likes Wenxin. She also finds out from Qianru about Wenxin's past. In order to steal Jiaxuan from her, Caining spills the secret of Wenxin's past, bringing about a huge commotion.

Just as Wenxin is troubled by affairs of the heart, Yingxiong is arrested for drug abuse. The family is thrown into chaos and financial hardship. Lihua wants Kaixin to perform at the Ghost Festival events to earn them some money. Wenxin voices her objections but to no avail.

~

Yongle (Gabriel Lee Zheng Hao) is a disabled boy who is in the PSLE class of the school for children with special needs. When his father Jianping (Zhang Wenxiang), a senior executive, first found out that his son was disabled, he turned cold towards the child. In the following years, the hardworking Yongle was constantly supported and cared for by his mother Xinglin (Chen Huihui). A few years later, Xinglin gets pregnant unexpectedly and Jianping insists that she goes for an abortion. Xinglin refuses. Under immense pressure, Xinglin develops pre-natal depression and the task of caring for Yongle suddenly falls on Jianping. Yongle begins to question his existence, wondering if his parents' problems will cease if he does not exist anymore.

Wenxin encounters one blow after another. She witnesses the pain the children are going through and is thrown into despair. Jiaxuan and a bunch of children she has helped in the past quietly appear at her side to help her through this difficult time of her life...

== Viewership ratings ==
Week	Date	Average audience in 5 weekdays (to nearest 1000)
1	29/05/2007 – 01/06/2007	556, 000
2	04/06/2007 – 08/06/2007	576, 000
3	11/06/2007 – 15/06/2007	561, 000
4	18/06/2007 – 22/06/2007	632, 000
Last episode	25/06/2007	691, 000

== Awards and nominations ==
This drama serial received 4 nominations in Star Awards 2007, MediaCorp's annual award ceremony. It won only one award, Young Talent Award. The other dramas that are nominated for Best Theme Songs are Honour and Passion, The Peak, Kinship & The Homecoming .

Awards
Award	Category	Recipients (if any)	Result
Star Awards 2007 红星大奖2007 颁奖典礼	Young Talent Award 青平果奖	Gabriel Lee 李正豪	Nominated
Star Awards 2007 红星大奖2007 颁奖典礼	Young Talent Award 青平果奖	Kyle Chan 陈星余	Won
Star Awards 2007 红星大奖2007 颁奖典礼	Young Talent Award 青平果奖	Fang Rong 符芳榕	Nominated
Star Awards 2007 红星大奖2007 颁奖典礼	Best Actor 最佳男主角	Zhang Yaodong 张耀栋	Nominated
Star Awards 2007 红星大奖2007 颁奖典礼	Best Supporting Actress 最佳女配角	Ng Hui 黄慧	Nominated
Star Awards 2007 红星大奖2007 颁奖典礼	Best Theme Song 最佳主题曲	多一点爱 by Chew Sin Huey 石欣卉	Nominated
