= Constance Song =

Singaporean actress (born 1975)

- Born: 18 May 1975 (age 50)
- Occupations: Actress; entrepreneur; model
- Years active: 1997–present
- Agent: LNX Global (2015-present)
- Children: 2

Stage name
- Traditional Chinese: 宋怡霏
- Simplified Chinese: 宋怡霏
- Hanyu Pinyin: Sòng Yífēi

Birth name
- Traditional Chinese: 宋清清
- Simplified Chinese: 宋清清
- Hanyu Pinyin: Sòng Qīngqīng

Constance Song (born Song Qing Qing on 18 May 1975) is a Singaporean actress and entrepreneur.

== Career ==
Song was a model before joining Star Search Singapore in 1997 and was subsequently offered a contract by TCS (predecessor of MediaCorp). She appeared in the wuxia series The Return of the Condor Heroes. Song has also acted in several English television series on Channel 5, most notably Point of Entry. She joined SPH MediaWorks and later returned to MediaCorp when they merged in 2005.

After over 12 years in the industry, Song won her first accolade at the Star Awards 2010. She was named the Best Supporting Actress for her role as the villainous Jiang Ruolin in The Ultimatum.

In 2015, Song became the first artiste to join Li Nanxing's talent management agency.

== Ventures ==
Song owned Bam! Restaurant which opened in 2013 and closed in 2024. She collaborated with a friend to set up Regalo, an online luxury F&B concept store, in January 2022. In August 2022, Song partnered a home baker friend to launch a line of wholesome cookies called Ole & Elo.

== Personal life ==
Song has a younger brother. She and her family used to reside in a 5-room flat in Bishan.

In August 1998, Song changed her Chinese name from "宋清清" (Sòng Qīngqīng) to 宋怡霏 (Sòng Yífēi).

Song gave birth to a baby girl on 18 May 2017, and to another daughter on 9 March 2021, at age 45. Song is known to be guarded about her private life and has declined to reveal the identity of her partner and her marital status.

== Filmography ==
=== Film ===
| Year | Title | Role | Notes | Ref |
|---|---|---|---|---|
| 2011 | The Ultimate Winner | Honey Ma | | |
| 2016 | Heartland: Rites of Passage | Wing's mother | Telemovie | |
| 2016 | Straight From The Heart - The Playground | Tan Huifang | Telemovie | |
| 2017 | Wonder Boy | Elizabeth Lee | | |

=== Television series ===
| Year | Title | Role | Notes | Ref |
|---|---|---|---|---|
| 1997 | From The Medical Files (医生档案) | | | |
| 1997 | My Big Brother (一家之主) | | | |
| 1998 | Back to School (摩登状元) | Ding Bingxiang | | |
| 1998 | Around People's Park (珍珠街坊) | Zhu Lingling | | |
| 1998 | The Return of the Condor Heroes | Cheng Ying | | |
| 1999 | From the Courtroom (法庭故事) | Fang Ning | | |
| 2000 | Dare to Strike (扫冰者) | Ann | | |
| 2001 | Happy Family (元氏一家人) | | | |
| 2001 | Legendary Fighter: Yang's Heroine | Chen Fenglian | | |
| 2001 | Master Swordsman Lu Xiaofeng | Lady Boss | | |
| 2004 | Zero | | | |
| 2004 | Money No Problem (恭喜发财) | | | |
| 2005 | A Promise for Tomorrow | Daidai | | |
| 2006 | Measure of Man | Hazel | | |
| 2006 | Maggi & Me | | | |
| 2006 | C.I.D. | Tata / Dawn | | |
| 2006 | Lady of Leisure (贤妻靓母) | He Meixian | | |
| 2006 | The Undisclosed | Rachael | | |
| 2006 | The Shining Star | Zeng Yiting | | |
| 2007 | Honour and Passion | Amy Lim | | |
| 2007 | The Greatest Love of All | Zhang Ying | | |
| 2007 | The Homecoming | Sessy Wong | | |
| 2007 | Making Miracles | Zhou Xiwen | | |
| 2008 | Love Blossoms II | Tao Linglan | | |
| 2008 | Perfect Cut | Yoyo Cheng | Guest cast | |
| 2008 | Love Blossoms | Tao Linglan | | |
| 2008 | Police & Thief | Genie Hua | | |
| 2009 | Mr & Mrs Kok (神探妙夫妻) | | | |
| 2009 | Together | Lucy | | |
| 2009 | The Ultimatum | Jiang Ruolin | | |
| 2009 | Table of Glory | Zhang Yao | | |
| 2010 | Point of Entry | Esther Ong | | |
| 2010 | The Family Court | Xu Fenghuang | | |
| 2011 | On the Fringe | Nancy | | |
| 2011 | A Tale of 2 Cities | Yin Zhengwen | | |
| 2012 | The Quarters | Shi Jinchun | | |
| 2012 | Don't Stop Believin' | Li Shengchun | | |
| 2013 | Sudden | Situ Xinmei | | |
| 2014 | Grace | | | |
| 2015 | Tanglin | Lim Xueling | | |
| 2016 | Fire Up | Eva Liang | | |
| 2016 | Koji's Cook | Ling Lingyong | Guest cast | |
| 2019 | Walk With Me (谢谢你出现在我的行程里) | Judy | | |
| 2019 | How Are You? | Ace | Cameo | |
| 2022 | Genie in a Cup (哇到宝) | Yang Xueling | | |
| 2022 | Sunny Side Up | Evelyn Lee | | |
| 2022 | When Duty Calls 2 (卫国先锋2) | | | |
| 2023 | Family Ties | Zhuo Kexiang | | |
| 2023 | Silent Walls | Qiu Suqing | | |

== Theatre ==
| Year | Title | Notes |
|---|---|---|
| 1999 | I Have A Date With Spring (我和春天有个约会) | |

== Awards and nominations ==
| Organisation | Year | Category | Nominated work | Result | Ref |
|---|---|---|---|---|---|
| Star Awards | 1997 | Best Newcomer | — | Nominated | |
| Star Awards | 2006 | Best Supporting Actress | C.I.D. (as Tata/Dawn) | Nominated | |
| Star Awards | 2010 | Best Supporting Actress | The Ultimatum (as Jiang Ruolin) | Won | |
| Star Awards | 2010 | Unforgettable Villain | The Ultimatum (as Jiang Ruolin) | Nominated | |
| Star Awards | 2012 | Best Supporting Actress | On the Fringe (as Nancy) | Nominated | |
| Star Awards | 2013 | Best Supporting Actress | Don't Stop Believin' (as Li Shenchun) | Nominated | |
| Asian Television Awards | 2010 | Best Actress in a Supporting Role | Together | Nominated | |
