= Huang Biren =

Singaporean actress

- Born: Wee Pat Ling; 7 March 1969 (age 57); Singapore
- Education: Mayflower Secondary School
- Occupations: Actress; television host
- Years active: 1988–present
- Spouse: Adrian Quek (m. 1996)
- Children: 3
- Awards: Full list

Chinese name
- Traditional Chinese: 黃碧仁
- Simplified Chinese: 黄碧仁
- Hanyu Pinyin: Huáng Bìrén

Huang Biren (born Wee Pat Ling on 7 March 1969) is a Singaporean actress and television host who received numerous honours and known for appearing in numerous MediaCorp Channel 8 television series. She was a full-time Mediacorp artiste from 1988 to 2008.

To date, Huang has received five Star Awards for Best Actress, a record for the most wins in that category.

== Early life and education ==
Often nicknamed Ling by relatives, Huang has one older sister and one younger brother. She studied at Mayflower Primary School and Mayflower Secondary School, where she developed a keen interest in oratorical and storytelling contests. She then completed her GCE Advanced Level examinations at Ang Mo Kio Pre-U Centre.

== Career ==
Huang joined the Singapore Broadcasting Corporation (now MediaCorp) in 1988 after completing its Professional Drama Performers' Training course. She was due to study at Hawaii Pacific University in the United States but chose to go into acting when SBC offered her a contract, much to the initial disappointment of her parents.

Having been in the industry for 10 years, Huang won her first Top 10 Most Popular Female Artistes award in the 1997 Star Awards. In 1998, Huang went on to star in the hit Chinese drama series Stand By Me, which recorded rocketing viewership ratings (defeating the high-profile series Return of the Condor Heroes), despite very little promotion done prior to the drama's telecast. She played a patient and caring wife of a paraplegic (played by Xie Shaoguang), which won her the Best Actress Award at the 1998 Star Awards. She was also the first Singaporean actress to receive a Best Actress nomination in the 1998 Asian Television Awards for Stand By Me. Her performance in this drama had touched the hearts of many audience – since then, she has become a household name for numerous Singaporeans.

Other award-winning lead roles other than the one in Stand By Me include Kelian, where she played an old-fashioned and cowardly woman who was always being abused by her mother in Beautiful Connection (2002), and Lucky, where she played a gambling addict in My Lucky Charm (2005).

In 2003, Huang was nominated for the Best Drama Performance by an Actress award in the Asian Television Awards for her role in A Child's Hope. In the same year, Huang was listed in People at The Peak – The Who's Who of Singapore. Her name was once again listed in the second edition of the book, which was published in 2006.

Since 2005, Huang has filmed an average of only one serial per year, compared to three drama series per year between 2002 and 2004. Rumours circulated that she feigned illness so that she need not take up roles that did not cast her in good light. Huang came out strongly against these rumours and attributed the drop in drama serials filmed to an asthma attack she suffered after filming The Undisclosed, granting her medical leave for a period of a year. Another reason cited by the local media was the media merger which took place in December 2004, which led to less dramas produced as competition from SPH MediaWorks ceased to exist.

In 2006, Huang did not film any serials although she appeared in the suspense thriller The Undisclosed (2006) which was filmed in 2005. Instead, she ventured into hosting or appeared as a guest in various variety shows. Though her drama serials reduced significantly, Huang was still able to maintain her popularity levels, as attested by her popularity award wins at the Star Awards ceremonies.

In June 2007, Huang was chosen as one of the 10 TV mentors for the Star Search 2007 Reality Talent Show contestants. In the same year, she was again nominated for the Best Actress award in the Asian Television Awards (ATA) and Star Awards 2007 for her role as a fat, naggy and fierce housewife in Mars VS Venus. Though she did not manage to clinch both of the awards, she was tipped the hot favourite to win by many media, audience and industry watchers. After she lost the ATA Best Actress award to Filipino actress Gina Pareño, Biren spoke to reporters from Channel News Asia:

A nomination out of so many countries – you're talking about the whole of Asia – is already something to be proud of. So, I think it's already something that I feel is a great achievement.

In the Star Awards 25th Anniversary Show, Huang won the My Favourite Actress Award, defeating hot favourites Zoe Tay and Fann Wong.

In November, 8 Days magazine noted that Huang had been the lead actress in seven of the 11 dramas with the highest viewership for their respective year since 1997. (8 Days reference: 7 Nov)

=== Departure from MediaCorp ===
On 4 August 2008, MediaCorp announced that Huang has left the TV station earlier on 30 June. The main reasons for her leaving were disagreements with MediaCorp over the new contract terms offered to her; and she also wanted to spend more time with her family, especially her 5-month-old infant girl. Huang extended her contract by one month as she co-hosted an episode of Glamour Mum and the Dude alongside Bryan Wong which was to be shown on 11 July. In an interview, Huang said

I thought about it (whether to renew the contract) even when I was (about to sleep) in bed. But when the time came to make the decision, I had to be firm.

— Huang Biren

Her decision to leave this industry was seen as a huge loss to MediaCorp Channel 8 by both the audience and the TV station, as her drama serials have consistently achieved high viewership ratings and her acting skills were recognised by many. After the news was released, forums were abuzz with numerous discussions about this issue, and many questioned if Huang would still be able to receive the All-Time Favourite Artiste award (an award given out for winning the Top 10 Popular Artiste award 10 times). Paul Chan, MediaCorp's Vice-President for Branding and Promotions, replied that the company has not decided if Huang will be awarded as meetings with the Star Awards 2009 Committee have not been held yet. MediaCorp does not rule out future collaborations with her on a project basis.

In 2008, Huang was initially offered a role in the drama series, The Little Nyonya. As she decided not to renew her contract, the role was offered to Xiang Yun instead.

On 31 October 2008, MediaCorp confirmed Huang would be receiving the All-Time Favourite Artiste Award at the 2009 Star Awards. On 1 November, Huang answered her supporters' queries if she would make a comeback, through telling reporters she has rejected some invitations from the TV Station to film dramas on a project basis. Huang was quoted as telling Shin Min Daily News,

If I were to come back, the most important conditions are (quality of) the script, role, how much time is needed for filming, and my husband's support. Money isn't a problem.

On 3 November, Huang was featured in a The Straits Times Life! Monday Interview. In the interview, she mentioned that she is "already fielding offers from production houses as well as theatre companies, though she has not accepted any yet", as she has to take care of her two children.

On 20 January 2009, Huang made a public appearance where she attended the gala premiere of local movie Love Matters.

Huang was awarded the All Time Favourite Artiste Award at the Star Awards 2009 ceremony held on 26 April 2009. The award was presented to her by Singapore's President, Sellapan Ramanathan.

After leaving the industry, Huang continued to take up numerous endorsement engagements. These include being a spokesperson for OCBC Bank's SmartSenior Programme. She filmed a TV advertisement for the bank, which also featured her mother.

In January 2010, she filmed a one-minute TV advertisement for L'Oréal Paris Revitalift Face Cream. In the same year, she also endorsed Ginvera Grorich Anti-Dandruff Shampoo. A television commercial was filmed and advertisements were also published in numerous print media. Biren was then appointed ambassador of slimming company BeauteHub in February 2011.

Huang made a public appearance at the annual Star Awards 2011 ceremony as guest presenter on 17 April 2011.

In June 2011, Huang was interviewed by LiveWell magazine. She said it was her dream to film a movie and she has plans to do so in the future if there is a chance. Her last drama with Mediacorp was Mars VS Venus.

Huang announced plans to return to television when she attended the Star Awards 2012 award ceremony as award presenter alongside Member of Parliament Baey Yam Keng. She revealed that discussions with MediaCorp are underway and she might star in a drama in 2013.

=== Return to entertainment industry ===
In an interview with local magazine i-Weekly in March 2013, Huang revealed that MediaCorp will continue to represent her in terms of artiste management and sourcing for ad hoc jobs which are of a more flexible nature.

In 2013, After a six-year hiatus, Huang was slated to star in the TV station's 2013 The Journey: A Voyage alongside Li Nanxing, Jeanette Aw and Elvin Ng. Weeks before filming commenced, Huang discovered she had a 10 cm cyst in her kidney and underwent surgery to remove it in April 2013. Due to the surgery, Huang had to pull out of the series. She described her decision to pull out of the series as "regrettable" but she felt her state of health was most important, and filming in Malaysia and Tangshan, China might affect her scheduled medical follow-ups. Carole Lin took over her role.

On 23 March 2014, Huang mentioned she has since made a full recovery from the surgery and will be making a television comeback in the second half of the year. However, she declined to provide details as discussions with the TV station were still ongoing. On 31 March 2014, MediaCorp TV Channel 8 announced on its official Facebook page that Huang will be making a comeback with two dramas in the works. Huang starred as a supportive wife of a down-and-out man opposite Thomas Ong in the serial Three Wishes which is slated to air in October 2014.

Audience response to Huang's comeback has been largely favourable, with the viewership of her comeback drama Three Wishes breaking the 1 million mark on its debut episode, a phenomenon rarely seen for local dramas. The captivating storyline, coupled with audience strong anticipation towards Huang's return, were cited as contributory factors towards the drama's strong showing. The finale episode attracted more than 1.1 million viewers, with ratings peaking at a record-breaking high of 1,134,000 viewers – propelling the drama to clinch Top Rated Drama at the 2015 Star Awards. Despite the popularity of the drama and the largely favourable audience response her comeback, Huang was not nominated for the Star Awards as she was a contract artiste with Mediacorp and not affiliated with any artiste management agency.

On 30 December, it was revealed that she will star alongside Zoe Tay, Rui En, Jeanette Aw, Li Nanxing and Qi Yuwu in the drama series, The Dream Makers II. The serial would be her first collaboration with Tay in 27 years. Huang then played the titular character in 2015 drama Tiger Mum, a disciplinarian figure who gels the family together. Both of Huang's 2015 drama serials, Tiger Mum and The Dream Makers ll clinched the Top Rated Drama and Best Drama Serial awards respectively at the 2016 Star Awards ceremony held on 24 April 2016.

== Personal life ==
In 1996, Huang married Adrian Quek, a Senior Assistant Commissioner of the Singapore Police Force, after dating him for two years. The couple have a son born on 10 March 2000. On 30 July 2007, Huang announced that she was two months pregnant with her second child, a girl due in March 2008. On 6 March 2008, Huang gave birth to her second child, one day before her own birthday at Thomson Medical Centre. The birth was described by Huang as extremely smooth.

On 9 February 2009, Huang's father died at the age of 67.

On 29 September 2009, during the wedding ceremony of MediaCorp artistes Fann Wong and Christopher Lee where she was one of the invited guests, Huang told reporters she was two-and-a-half months pregnant with her third child. The pregnancy was unplanned and the baby is expected to be born in April 2010. In February 2010, Huang commented that her third pregnancy was a tough one when she was interviewed by The New Paper. She had an extreme case of severe morning sickness where she had to take medication to prevent herself from throwing up in the first trimester. Huang also feels more tired compared to her second pregnancy mainly because taking care of her second child takes up a lot of her energy. She gave birth to a girl on 29 April 2010.

In April 2013, Huang was diagnosed with a 10cm cyst on one of her kidneys and had an operation to remove it. The operation lasted for six hours instead of two due to complications.

Huang is the aunt of Singapore National fencing athlete, Jet Ng.

Huang lists Chen Hanwei, Zoe Tay, Pan Lingling and ex-actress Magdeline Chu as her closest friends in the industry. She also revealed she feels most at ease while working with ex-actor Xie Shaoguang because they have very good chemistry on screen, though they seldom keep in contact in private.

Addressed affectionately as ‘'Biren-jie'’ (碧仁姐) by numerous artistes of the younger generation, Huang is also widely seen as a role model to artistes such as Jeanette Aw, Felicia Chin, Zhang Yao Dong, Zhou Ying and Ya Hui, among many others. Aw described Huang as her favourite local actress and admires her professionalism; Chin respects Huang for her vast experience and acting skills; Zhang and Zhou both regard her as a mentor while Ya Hui lists Huang as one of her inspirations.

== Filmography ==
=== Television series ===
Year	Title	Role	Notes	Ref.
1989	Patrol	Helen		
1989	My Sweet Rival 摩登俏冤家	May		
1989	Return of the Prince 丝路迷城	Zi Yi		
1990	Friends Next Door 我爱芳邻	—N/a		
1990	The Village Hero 大吉传奇	Zhao Youlan		
1990	Wishing Well 幻海奇遇 之《再来一次又如何》	Xu Xiaoling		
1991	Home Sweet Home (宜家宜乐)	—N/a		
1991	The Other Woman (醋劲100)	Xia Lian-na		
1992	The Breaking Point (暴风边缘)	Li Chubing		
1992	Mystery II (迷离夜II 之《不死咒》)	Li Yalun		
1993	The Invincible Warriors (皇朝铁将金粉情)	Xi Shanhe		
1993	Happy Reunion (年年有鱼)	Zhu Baobao		
1994	Silk And Romance (情丝万缕)	Zhong Qi		
1995	Strange Encounters II (奇缘III 之《门神》)	Qian Nian Lü Yu Jing		
1995	Strange Encounters III (奇缘III 之《救姻缘》)	Liu Hong		
1995	Morning Express	Madam Han		
1995	The Ranger (铁血雄心)	Xiao Bi		
1995	Project 'B' (B计划)	Qin Lei		
1996	Legend of the White Hair Brides	Lian Nichang		
1996	Marriage Dollars and Sense 5C (5C老公)	Song Xueqin		
1997	Living By Night (都是夜归人)	Gu Xianfang		
1997	Courting Trouble (婚姻法庭)	Wan Qing		
1997	My Wife, Your Wife, Their Wives (101老婆 之《老婆的玻璃鞋》)	Kitty		
1997	Tales of the City (都市奇情 之《六人晚宴》)	Lin Huiling		
1997	Not The Facts (迷离剧场 之《咒语》)	Hu Lijuan		
1998	Man at the Crossroads (四个好涩的男人)	Li Meiyi		
1998	Stand By Me	Lin Wenyu		
1999	From The Courtroom (法庭故事)	Yang Zhanyi		
1999	Are you my Brother?	Fang Ting		
1999	爱情乱码	—N/a		
2000	Angel's Dream	Ye Ning		
2001	Three Women and A Half	Cheng Peiyi Monica		
2001	The Hotel	Huang Yiren		
2002	Vive La Famille 好儿好女	Sun Yumin		
2002	The Vagrant	Gan Shushu		
2002	Beautiful Connection	Fan Kelian		
2003	Vive La Famille II 好儿好女2	Sun Yumin		
2003	Holland V	Huang Biren		
2003	Home In Toa Payoh	Zheng Huiming		
2003	A Child's Hope	Aunt Ding		
2003	Popiah and Me	Su-lin		
2004	Timeless Gift	Guo Yueli		
2004	Beautiful Trio	Christina		
2004	Double Happiness II	Huang Biren		
2004	An Ode to Life	Wang Suzhi		
2004	Chronicles of Life 我爱我家之真情实录《谁可相依》	Liu Baoyu		
2005	My Lucky Charm	Lucky Zhang Qiuyue		
2006	The Undisclosed	Yan Kexin		
2007	Mars VS Venus	Xie Wenjing		
2014	Three Wishes	Zeng Shanmei		
2015	Tiger Mum	He Xuemei		
2015	The Dream Makers II	Guan Xie'en		
2016	Fire Up	Zheng Meimei		
2016	Hero	He Xuemei	Cameo	
2017	Three Little Wishes	Zeng Shanmei	Cameo	
2020	Recipe of Life 味之道	Chen Huiying		
2022	Your World in Mine	Li Jiayun		

=== Variety shows ===
Year	Title	Role	Notes	Ref
1991	Variety Tonight (开心五重奏)	Host		
1992	Variety Tonight (开心五重奏)	Host		
1992	Sunday in Singapore (美丽星期天)	Host		
1993	Lunar New Year Special '93 (迎新年1993)	Host		
1993	Star Speak (星星问)	Host		
1993	Variety Tonight (开心五重奏)	Host		
1993	Countdown '93 (1993年到数活动！)	Host		
1994	Afternoon Leisure Hour (午后闲情)	Host		
2006	Nightwalk (步夜城)	Host		
2006	Glamour Licious 2 (请你吃好料2)	Co-host		
2006	Never Say Die Talent Contest (永不言败)	Judge		
2006	Hey Baby! Hey Baby! (幸福密码)	Judge		
2007	Star Search Singapore	Mentor		
2007	Mission 4 (创业无敌手IV)	Co-host	Episode 1 and 2	
2007	Bioskin Dreams Come True Beauty Contest	Judge		
2008	Glamour Mum and The Dude (辣妈好时尚)	Co-host	Episode 5	
2012	S.N.A.P. (熠熠星光总动员)	Judge	Last episode	
2013	The Joy Truck (快乐速递)	Artiste Ambassador		

== Discography ==
=== Compilation albums ===
Year	Title	Ref
2016	MediaCorp Music Lunar New Year Album 16 (新传媒群星金猴添喜庆)	

== Awards and nominations ==
Organisation	Year	Category	Nominated work	Result	Ref
Star Awards	1997	Best Supporting Actress	Courting Trouble	Nominated	
Star Awards	1997	Top 10 Most Popular Female Artistes	—N/a	Won	
Star Awards	1998	Best Actress	Stand By Me	Won	
Star Awards	1999	Best Actress	From the Courtroom	Nominated	
Star Awards	1999	Top 10 Most Popular Female Artistes	—N/a	Won	
Star Awards	2000	Best Supporting Actress	Angel's Dream	Nominated	
Star Awards	2000	Top 10 Most Popular Female Artistes	—N/a	Won	
Star Awards	2001	Best Actress	Three Women and a Half	Nominated	
Star Awards	2001	Top 10 Most Popular Female Artistes	—N/a	Won	
Star Awards	2002	Best Actress	Beautiful Connection	Won	
Star Awards	2002	Top 10 Most Popular Female Artistes	—N/a	Won	
Star Awards	2003	Top 10 Most Popular Female Artistes	—N/a	Won	
Star Awards	2004	Best Actress	An Ode To Life	Won	
Star Awards	2004	Top 10 Most Popular Female Artistes	—N/a	Won	
Star Awards	2005	Best Actress	My Lucky Charm	Won	
Star Awards	2005	Top 10 Most Popular Female Artistes	—N/a	Won	
Star Awards	2006	Top 10 Most Popular Female Artistes	—N/a	Won	
Star Awards	2007	Best Actress	Mars vs Venus	Nominated	
Star Awards	2007	Top 10 Most Popular Female Artistes	—N/a	Won	
Star Awards	2007	My Favourite Actress	—N/a	Won	
Star Awards	2007	Favourite Onscreen Couple (Drama)	—N/a	Won	
Star Awards	2009	All-Time Favourite Artiste	—N/a	Won	
Star Awards	2016	Favourite Female Character	The Dream Makers II	Nominated	
Star Awards	2022	Best Actress	Recipe of Life	Won	
Star Awards	2022	Most Hated Villain	Recipe of Life	Nominated	
Star Awards	2023	Best Actress	Your World in Mine	Won	
Star Awards	2023	Favourite Female Show Stealer	Your World in Mine	Nominated	
Star Awards	2023	Favourite CP	Your World in Mine	Nominated (Note: Shared with Yao Wenlong)	
Asian Television Awards	1998	Best Drama Performance by an Actress	Stand By Me	Nominated	
Asian Television Awards	2003	Best Drama Performance by an Actress	A Child's Hope	Won	
Asian Television Awards	2007	Best Drama Performance by an Actress	Mars vs Venus	Won	
