= Dawn Yeoh =

Singaporean actress (born 1986)

- Born: Dawn Yeoh Yi Shan; 5 May 1986 (age 40); Singapore
- Education: Jurong Primary School; Clementi Town Secondary School
- Alma mater: Ngee Ann Polytechnic
- Occupations: Actress; host; businesswoman
- Years active: 2003–present
- Agent: Catwalk

Chinese name
- Chinese: 姚懿珊
- Hanyu Pinyin: Yáo Yìshān

Dawn Yeoh Yi Shan (born 5 May 1986) is a Singaporean actress, host and businesswoman. In 2006, she was named as one of the Seven Princesses of Mediacorp.

== Early life ==
Yeoh was educated in Jurong Primary School, Clementi Town Secondary School and Ngee Ann Polytechnic.

== Career ==
In 2004, Yeoh signed a 10-year contract with agency Future Stage.

Yeoh started her career in The Shining Star where she played a lead role. She went on to play a supporting role in Honour and Passion, and was involved in a production called Taste of Love. In 2009, she was cast in Crime Busters x 2, Beach.Ball.Babes and Malaysian production The Beautiful Scent. She filmed The Dream Catchers and Your Hand In Mine. She was nominated for the Star Awards for Top 10 Most Popular Female Artistes in 2007 and 2009.

In 2009, five years into her contract, Yeoh wanted to terminate her contract with Future Stage but was unsuccessful leading to a public dispute.

In 2014, Yeoh's contract with Future Stage expired and in April, she signed with talent agency Catwalk. Yeoh appeared in 118.

Yeoh appeared in Peace & Prosperity, Crescendo, Let It Go, Disclosed and The Dream Makers.

In 2018, Yeoh appeared in Gifted, Limited Edition & Jalan Jalan. In 2019, she appeared in My Agent Is My Hero 2 & Remember Us This Way.

Yeoh also co-founded the F&B company Sibay Shiok, with her celebrity friends Terence Cao, Vincent Ng and Shane Pow.

== Filmography ==
=== Television series ===
| Year | Title | Role | Notes | Ref. |
|---|---|---|---|---|
| 2006 | The Shining Star | Ah Li | | |
| 2007 | Honour and Passion | Liang Xiaonu | | |
| 2007 | The Peak (最高点) | Cai Zhenya | | |
| 2008 | Crime Busters x 2 | Xia Jingyi | | |
| 2008 | Beach.Ball.Babes (球爱大战) | Wang Sixing | | |
| 2008 | The Beautiful Scent (美丽的气味) | Zheng Meili | | |
| 2008 | Taste of Love | Tao Le | | |
| 2009 | The Dream Catchers | Wang Peipei | | |
| 2009 | Your Hand In Mine | Duoli's foe | Cameo | |
| 2013 | Disclosed | Huang Wenyan | | |
| 2013 | The Dream Makers | Xie Liuxin | | |
| 2014 | 118 | Zhang Keke | | |
| 2014 | The Caregivers (Missy 先生) | Zhao Xinling | | |
| 2015 | Crescendo | Fang Xinyi | | |
| 2015 | Let It Go (分手快乐) | Judy | | |
| 2015 | Echoes of Time (星月传奇) | Liu Xingyue | | |
| 2016 | Peace & Prosperity | Huang Zijun | | |
| 2018 | Jalan Jalan (带你去走走) | Zhang Weiru | | |
| 2018 | Gifted | He Lulu | | |
| 2019 | After The Stars (攻星计) | Wang Ling | Cameo | |
| 2019 | I'm Madam (女友变身记) | He Xinyi | | |
| 2019 | My Agent Is My Hero 2 (流氓经纪2) | Ah Hua | | |
| 2019 | Remember Us This Way (到此一游) | Miss Chew | Cameo; as director | |
| 2019 | Limited Edition (我是限量版) | Michelle | | |
| 2020 | Loving You (爱。。。没有距离) | Zhang Wenyu | | |
| 2021 | My Mini-Me & Me (很久以后的未来) | Shen Jia Yi | | |
| 2023 | Fix My Life | Jie Ru | | |
| 2025 | Emerald Hill - The Little Nyonya Story (小娘惹之翡翠山) | Kang Si Li | | |

=== Film ===
| Year | Title | Role | Notes | Ref. |
|---|---|---|---|---|
| 2014 | Standing In Still Water | | | |
| 2021 | The Lying Theory | Sister Lingyan | Short film | |
| 2024 | King of Hawkers | Zhang Nala | Feature film debut | |

== Awards and nominations ==
| Organisation | Year | Category | Nominated work | Result | Ref |
|---|---|---|---|---|---|
| Star Awards | 2006 | Best Newcomer | —N/a | Nominated | |
| Star Awards | 2007 | Top 10 Most Popular Female Artistes | —N/a | Nominated | |
| Star Awards | 2009 | Top 10 Most Popular Female Artistes | —N/a | Nominated | |
| Star Awards | 2019 | Top 10 Most Popular Female Artistes | —N/a | Nominated | |
| Star Awards | 2021 | Top 10 Most Popular Female Artistes | —N/a | Nominated | |
| Star Awards | 2025 | Top 10 Most Popular Female Artistes | —N/a | Nominated | |
