= The Peak (TV series) =

Singaporean television series

- 最高点
- Genre: Modern Drama
- Written by: Ang Eng Tee 洪荣狄
- Starring: Christopher Lee; Qi Yuwu; Elvin Ng; Jeanette Aw; Dawn Yeoh
- Opening theme: 并肩的方向 by Jeff Wang
- Ending theme: 想听的话 by Chew Sin Huey and Jeff Wang
- Country of origin: Singapore
- Original language: Chinese
- No. of episodes: 21

Production
- Producer: Chia Mien Yang 谢敏洋
- Running time: approx. 45 minutes

Original release
- Network: MediaCorp Channel 8
- Release: 8 January – 5 February 2007

The Peak (Chinese: 最高点) is a Singaporean Chinese drama which is telecast on Singapore's free-to-air channel, MediaCorp Channel 8. It made its debut on 8 January 2007 and ended its run on 5 February 2007. The show was initially slated for a 20-episode run, but was extended to 21 episodes due to over-runs in the recording of the drama.

Despite several negative reviews, the show was watched by almost 1 million viewers, making it one of the highest rated local dramas, breaking records previously held by A Million Treasures and Measure of Man.

== Cast ==
=== Main ===
- Christopher Lee as Fang Hong'an
- Qi Yuwu as Chen Tianjun
- Elvin Ng as Cai Zhihang
- Jeanette Aw as Zhong Xiaoyang
- Dawn Yeoh as Cai Zhenya

=== Supporting ===
- Ben Yeo as Lu Ka
- Ann Kok as Xiu Ping
- Lin Meijiao as Ling Ling
- Huang Wenyong as Tie Tou
- Eelyn Kok as Lin Shuanghui
- Benedict Goh

== Accolades ==
Organisation	Year	Category	Nominee(s)	Result	Ref.
Star Awards	2007	Best Actor	Qi Yuwu	Nominated	

== See also ==
- List of programmes broadcast by Mediacorp Channel 8
