= Beautiful Connection =

- 九层糕
- Country of origin: Singapore
- Original language: Chinese
- No. of episodes: 20

Production
- Producer: Kok Len Shoong

Original release
- Network: MediaCorp TV Channel 8
- Release: 5 August – 30 August 2002

Beautiful Connection (Chinese: 九层糕) is a Singaporean Chinese language family drama serial. It was telecast in 2002. The show earned many nominations for the Star Awards including Best Actor, Best Actress, Best Supporting Actress, Best TV Drama, Best Theme Song, Best Director and many more.

This drama repeated in 2007, on MediaCorp TV Channel 8, Mondays and Tuesdays, 10.30pm to 12.30am. In March 2026, a second repeat telecast of the show was shown on Weekday early mornings, from 2am to 4am.

The series was also mentioned in Episode 45 of 118 Season 1.

== Plot ==
Beautiful Connection begins with the lives of three daughters from a single-parent family, headed by a domineering and unreasonable mother, Fatty Zhen (addressed as féi mā as her nickname). The three daughters have characters that are very different as a result of their mother's upbringing.

Spoilt by Fatty Zhen, the youngest daughter, Ke Ke, is well-educated but arrogant. On the other hand, Ke Lian and Ke Li's happiness have been short-changed to create more opportunities for their youngest sister.

Despite this, both Ke Lian and Ke Li are able to adapt better to society, unlike Fatty Zhen and Ke Ke, whose attitude puts people off. Ke Lian eventually manages to find true love with Lion King, while Ke Li finds happiness through her own family and career, and Ke Ke finds hope and joy in her new career and in turn, turns her love life back around by developing kindness and humility.

It is only in the face of an economic crisis and a stroke that Fatty Zhen did the arrogant Fatty Zhen and Ke Ke realise and learn about humility and the importance of maintaining good human relationships.

Other supporting cast includes the Lin family, consisting of Ya Xi (brother to Fatty Zhen), married to Mo Lan Ying and they own a family provision store in the neighbourhood. They have one daughter, Xiang Xiang, who later finds love with Zheng Yu, a manager at a local supermarket chain which is an arch competitor to the Lin family's business.

While Beautiful Connection reflects on the harsh realities and pressures of working life, it also shows that there will always be hope and warmth even during a challenging times such as an economic crisis.

== Cast ==
- Mimi Chu as Lin Yu Zhen
- Huang Biren as Fan Ke Lian
- Aileen Tan as Fan Ke Li
- Jeanette Aw as Fan Ke Ke
- Xie Shaoguang as Lion King
- Huang Shi Nan as Jiang Xue Liang
- Qi Yuwu as Zheng Rui Sheng
- Allan Wu as Du Zheng Yu
- Henry Thia as Lin Ya Xi
- Tan Kheng Hua as Mo Lan Ying
- Bukoh Mary as Lin Xiang Xiang
- Yang Lina as Yu Zhu
- Zhang Yao Dong as Sam
- Louis Lim as Kopi-O
- Ding Sen Yan as Jason
- Chen Ming Pei as Lan-jie
- Joanne Peh as He Wei
- Alice Ho

== Producer ==
The series' producer is Kok Len Shoong.

== Awards and nominations ==
| Organisation | Year | Category | Nominee | Result | Ref. |
|---|---|---|---|---|---|
| Star Awards | 2002 | Best Actor | Xie Shaoguang | Nominated | |
| Star Awards | 2002 | Best Actress | Aileen Tan | Nominated | |
| Star Awards | 2002 | Best Actress | Huang Biren | Won | |
| Star Awards | 2002 | Best Supporting Actress | Tan Kheng Hua | Nominated | |
| Star Awards | 2002 | Best Drama Serial | —N/a | Won | |
| Star Awards | 2002 | Young Talent Award | Liew Po Zhuang 刘柏妆 | Nominated | |
| Star Awards | 2002 | Highest viewership 最高收视率电视剧 | —N/a | Won | |
| Star Awards | 2002 | Best Theme Song 《快乐方式》 | Rui En | Nominated | |
