= Measure of Man =

- 大男人, 小男人
- Genre: Modern Drama
- Starring: Huang Wenyong; Ben Yeo; Zhang Yaodong; Aileen Tan; Lynn Poh; Ezann Lee; Constance Song
- Country of origin: Singapore
- Original language: Mandarin
- No. of episodes: 25

Production
- Running time: approx. 45 minutes

Original release
- Network: MediaCorp
- Release: 7 August – 8 September 2006

Measure of Man (大男人, 小男人) is a Singaporean Mandarin language drama, telecast on Mediacorp TV Channel 8, 9 pm. It made its debut on 7 August 2006 and ended its run on 8 September 2006.

It is exactly the opposite of another show, Beautiful Trio (大女人,小女人), also produced by Mediacorp. While Beautiful Trio examines the problems that Singaporean women face, Measure of Man deals with the problems men face instead, with Huang Wenyong, Ben Yeo and Zhang Yaodong as the lead actors. The 2 shows have the same director and executive producer. This show has a total of 25 episodes and it was the second most watched local drama serial for the year 2006 after Love Concierge.

Veteran actor and actress Huang Wenyong and Aileen Tan were seen as potential Star Awards 2006 Best Actor and Best Actress nominees because of their excellent acting that the audience enjoyed. However, both were not nominated.

The show received mixed reviews. While Aileen Tan, Huang Wenyong and Li Yinzhu (Cai Lianwei's sister-in-law) were praised for their acting, new artistes who had less than 2 years of experience in Mediacorp, such as Ben Yeo and Ezann Lee were heavily criticized both by critics and the general public.

== Plot ==
Despite having a bright five-year-old son and a successful position at a bank, Lian Wei is hardly the man he once aspired to be.

Already, Lian Wei's relationship with his wife, Patricia, is breaking down due to the recent spade of major setbacks.

At work, Lian Wei is caught up with the problems of his close confidant and colleague, Norman, who is forced to choose between forsaking his carefree ways and committing to Melissa, his present love interest.

Still serving National Service, Lian Wei's nephew, Shen Gen, is already married to his girlfriend, Kate, because of an unexpected pregnancy.

Meanwhile, Patricia is constantly lashing out on Lian Wei for taking full responsibility of caring for his parents' expenses.

Amidst a failing marriage and the eventual loss of his job, Lian Wei finds solace and comfort with his ex-colleague, Hazel. Soon, an affair develops and Lian Wei's marriage took a turn for the worse when Patricia files for divorce.

== Cast ==
- Huang Wenyong as Cai Lianwei, 43 years old
- Ben Yeo as Cai Shengen Root, 22 years old
- Zhang Yaodong as Norman, 30 years old
- Aileen Tan as Patricia (Cai Lianwei's wife), 40 years old
- Lynn Poh as Melissa (Root's sister and Norman's lover), 29, later 30 years old
- Ezann Lee as Kate (Root's wife), 22 years old
- Constance Song as Hazel (Cai Lianwei's lover), 30 years old
