= Metamorphosis (TV series) =

- 破茧而出
- Genre: Police procedural
- Written by: Phang Kai Yee 彭凯毅; Lim Gim Lan 林锦兰
- Starring: Rui En; Chen Hanwei; Terence Cao; Yvonne Lim; Thomas Ong
- Opening theme: "斗神" by Daren Tan Sze Wei
- Ending theme: "背叛" by Chew Sin Huey, Daren Tan Sze Wei
- Country of origin: Singapore
- Original language: Chinese
- No. of episodes: 20

Production
- Producer: Yeo Saik Pin 杨锡彬
- Running time: approx. 45 minutes

Original release
- Network: MediaCorp
- Release: September 18 – October 15, 2007

Metamorphosis (Chinese: 破茧而出 "Breaking Out Of The Shell" in Chinese) is a Singaporean Chinese police procedural drama which is being telecast on Singapore's free-to-air channel, MediaCorp TV Channel 8. It made its debut on 18 September 2007, screening at 9 PM every night on weekdays. The serial consists of 20 episodes.

In the last few episodes, the serial recorded a viewership rate of over 1 million and was awarded the "Best Drama Series Award" in the Star Awards 2007. Yvonne Lim also received the "Best Actress Award" in the same event.

== Cast ==
=== Main cast ===
- Rui En as An Xiaoqian
- Chen Hanwei as Ouyang Li
- Terence Cao as Di Lun
- Yvonne Lim as Sheryl Wen Wanrou
- Thomas Ong as Hu Xicun

=== Supporting cast ===
| Cast | Role |
|---|---|
| Chen Guohua | Cao Zhongming |
| Ng Hui | Mya Sun Meiya |
| Julian Hee | Leo Meng Tianbao |
| Ix Shen | Ryan Hou |
| Nick Shen | Zhang Shaoqi |
| Hong Hui Fang | Ouyang Su |
| Nathaniel Ho | Wen Pinliang |

=== Special appearances ===
| Cast | Role |
|---|---|
| Brandon Wong | Rattlesnake |
| Huang Yiliang | Red Pig |
| Ong Ai Leng | Blood Rose |
| Cavin Soh | Jin Yongjian |
| Adam Chen | Ke Mingde |
| Richard Low | An Guoxiong |
| Wang Yuqing | Zhao Baoqiang |
| Rayson Tan | Zhao Shiqiang |
| Bryan Wang | Leon |
| Carole Lin | Melinda Guan |
| Alan Tern | Liu Hansheng |
| May Phua | Gina Cheng |

== Reception ==
The serial generated largely positive reviews from critics and recorded a viewership of over a million in its final episodes.

=== Viewership ===
| Week | Date | Average Number of audience in five weekdays (Rounded off to nearest thousand) |
|---|---|---|
| Week 1 | 18 September 2007 to 21 September 2007 | 678,000 |
| Week 2 | 23 September 2007 to 27 September 2007 | 674,000 |
| Week 3 | 1 October 2007 to 5 October 2007 | 720,000 |
| Week 4 | 8 October 2007 to 12 October 2007 | 722,000 |
| Series Finale | 15 October 2007 | 786,000 |

=== Accolades ===
| Organisation | Year | Category | Recipient(s) | Result | Ref. |
|---|---|---|---|---|---|
| Star Awards | 2007 | Best Set Design | Ho Hock Choon | Won | |
| Star Awards | 2007 | Best Drama Cameraman | Lim Hap Choon | Won | |
| Star Awards | 2007 | Best Actress | Yvonne Lim | Won | |
| Star Awards | 2007 | Best Drama Serial | Metamorphosis | Won | |
| Star Awards | 2007 | Top 10 Highest Viewership Local Dramas in 2007 | Metamorphosis | Top 10 | |

== See also ==
- List of programmes broadcast by Mediacorp Channel 8
- Breaking out of Shell Theme Song
