= Shi Xin Hui =

- Born: Chew Sin Huey; 23 June 1981 (age 45); Johor Bahru, Johor, Malaysia
- Education: Foon Yew High School; National University of Singapore
- Occupations: Singer-songwriter, composer, lyricist
- Years active: 2005–2011
- Spouse: Anders Stenquist (m. 2016)
- Children: 1

Chinese name
- Traditional Chinese: 石欣卉
- Simplified Chinese: 石欣卉
Transcriptions
Standard Mandarin
- Hanyu Pinyin: Shí xīn huì
Yue: Cantonese
- Jyutping: Sek6 Jan1 Wai2
Southern Min
- Hokkien POJ: Chio̍h Him-húi
- Musical career
- Also known as: Sing; Sing Chew
- Genres: Mandopop
- Label: Play Music (subsidiary of Warner Music)
- Website: www.shixinhui.com

Chew Sin Huey (Shi Xin Hui; Chinese: 石欣卉; pinyin: Shí Xīnhuì; Jyutping: Sek6 Jan1 Wai2; Pe̍h-ōe-jī: Chio̍h Him-húi; born 23 June 1981), also known as Sing Chew, is a Malaysian-born former singer based in Singapore, who was one of the five popular new talents emerged from the Channel U's popular singing talent show, Project SuperStar 2005 in Singapore.

== Early life and education ==
Shi studied at S.R.J.K (C) Kuo Kuang and Foon Yew High School. She then studied at National University of Singapore and majored in Chinese Studies and Political Science.

== Career ==
Shi was also involved in campus performances and took up the lead role of a musical and also held a mini concert when she was studying at the National University of Singapore. She had also taken part in Malaysia's popular talent search contest, Astro Talent Quest in 2004.

In 2005, Shi took part in Channel U's Project SuperStar reality singing contest. Shi would become the runner up in the female category of the contest.

Shi also made many appearances on TV, including her participation in a local Mandarin idol drama Dream Chasers as one of the female lead. Other TV appearances of include her hosting a game show that was being shown on channel U, The 7-eleven game show, where she is the leader of one of the four teams in the show and each team's objective is to eliminate the other teams by arriving at the designated 7-eleven convenience store and play the games. She also appears on a local talk/debate show, Cross Fire, where she showcases her verbal talents and well-structured opinions on social issues which invite guests to voice out their opinion on a particular topic, and as well as Let's Shoot! and also in music oriented variety show like Music in the Air.

Her debut album 从台北到北京 consist of four original tracks, five covers and a cover duet with Tan. She even penned the lyrics for her album's no. 1 hit, 从台北到北京 / From Taipei To Beijing (which is a cover of popular Danish group, Infernal's "From Paris to Berlin"). The song 从台北到北京 was an instant hit with the listeners and became popular as ringtone downloads and received frequent airplay on radio stations as well as in pubs or night hangouts because of its strong rhythmic techno nature. Her music video for the song From Taipei To Beijing became a hot topic in local newspapers and the online community after a 25-second video was leaked onto the popular video sharing website, YouTube. The video had more than 40,000 hits and she made a stunning return from her reclusion from the industry after almost one year of hiatus while she has been preparing for her debut album. It was shocking for those who had always regarded her as the girl next door because of her demure looks and her plain dress sense and could not accept this major change. Following her debut release, she also became more confident, pretty and fashionable and has shown to critics that she has better fashion sense now after vicious remarks and criticisms were directed at her during her competition days. She was also hailed as Singapore's version of popular and sexy Japanese singer, Kumi Koda by her record company. Her popularity in Singapore landed her on the cover of a few magazines and many other magazine articles and spreads. Her immense popularity even as a debut singer made her the talk of the town for quite a while. Although there is a shift of focus onto her music video and her dressing, the album received good feedback from music professionals and media where most reviews gave her at least 3/5 stars with some as high as 4.5/5 stars because of her steely and emotive delivery which is rare for a newcomer. It also achieved good sales results especially for a newcomer and thus proving her popularity not just in Singapore but also the Malaysia regions. Shi was also ranked as top five Asian pop singer and top five personalities in 2006 by Singapore's premier and most prestigious English newspaper, The Straits Times together with the likes of Asian superstars David Tao and Andy Lau.

However Shi feels that she still needs to improve on many aspects and is set to move on to other regions of the Chinese community like Taiwan and China of which the album title, 从台北到北京 / From Taipei To Beijing, had vividly shown her ambitious vision to take over the Chinese music industry by storm. For her debut album, adopted an English name, Sing. It reflects her passion for singing, sounds like her romanized name, Sin Huey (Xin Hui), and indicates the fact that she is from Singapore.

Before this release, she had also lent her vocals to numerous Mediacorp soundtracks, drama theme songs and compilations. The drama theme and sub-theme songs that she sang for Mediacorp were later released as her personal compilation. It was a great success as the compilation clinched the top position of sales in renowned music stores like CD-Rama and Sembawang Music, indicating that the sales results were good.

Born and raised in Malaysia, Shi has not forget about her roots after starting her music career from Singapore. She has returned multiple times to her alma mater, Foon Yew High School and has also performed in a charity concert on its very soil.

Her ability in singing was further recognised as she won the Best Newcomer award in Singapore Hits Award, a prestigious award ceremony for Chinese musicians all over the world.

=== Events and milestones ===
- 18 August 2005 – First female runner-up after garnering the highest points 44/50 from professional judges from local big scale competition Project Superstar, which was judged accordingly with 70% of total score from public votes & 30% from professional judges
- 18 October 2005 – Signed a three-year contract with Play Music Singapore
- 30 November 2006 – Debut album 从台北到北京 released
- 10 December 2006 – Star Awards nominee for Best Newcomer, Top 10 Female Artiste and Best Theme Song (The Rainbow Connection)
- 16 December 2006 – First ever album autograph session at Bugis Junction
- 30 December 2006 – Voted by The Straits Times as top five Asian pop and top five personalities
- 27 January 2007 – Island-wide airing of the music video 你给的 on channel U
- 2 March 2007 – Released celebratory version of debut album 从台北到北京
- 24 March 2007 – Island-wide airing of the music video 昨天 on channel U
- 14 September 2007 – Compilation of drama theme songs, The BestDrama, released
- 2007 – Nominated in Top 11 for Most Outstanding Malaysia Artiste by Malaysia Radio 988
- 27 October 2007 – Nominated for Best Newcomer, Most Popular Newcomer, Most Popular Female Artiste in 2007 Singapore Hits Award
- 27 October 2007 – Awarded the Best Newcomer in Singapore Hits Award 2007
- 26 December 2008 – Second album 女皇 Queen released
- February 2009 – 女皇 Queen limited edition album released

== Personal life ==
Shi married Swedish husband Anders Stenquist in 2016. They both have a child.

== Filmography ==
=== Television ===
Year	Title	Role	Notes	Ref
2006	Dream Chasers 梦拼图	Charlotte		
2007	Metamorphosis			
2010	Friends Forever 我爱麻滋			
2011	A Song to Remember 星洲之夜			

== Discography ==
Date of release	Title (Chinese)(English)	Released by	Remarks
September 2005	不要说抱歉 [Don't Say Sorry]	Play Music, Mediacorp Studios	Part of the Best of 绝对Superstar Compilation album
November 2005	舞出彩虹The Rainbow Connection, 看透(Looking Through), 遇见爱情(Meeting Love) with Hong Jun Yang	Universal Music Group, Rock Records, Mediacorp Studios	Part of a compilation album, The Rainbow Connection OST
16 December 2005	First Love, 不要说抱歉, 遗失的美好 with Kelly Poon, 有你真好 with Chew Sin Ruey, WE Will Rock U with Various Artistes, 老鼠爱大米 with Various Artistes	Mediacorp Studios, Play Music	绝对Superstar Live演唱会2005 VCD
December 2005	Disk 1: 遗失的美好 61ders Radio Edit, 不要说抱歉 Meteora Radio Edit Disk 2: 遗失的美好 61ders Extended Remix, 不要说抱歉 Meteora Club Mix	Play Music, Mediacorp Studios	Part of a compilation album, Best of 绝对Superst*r the super d*nce collection
December 2005	遗失的美好	Play Music	Part of a compilation album, K 歌唱不完
January 2006	少年的我[When I Was a Youth](Various Artistes) 春 Spring sang with Kelly Poon	Mediacorp Studios, Universal Music Group	Part of a compilation album, 旺事如意, a Chinese new year album produced by Mediacorp Studios Production in 2006
July 2006	Dreamchaser【梦·拼图】, lead role of Charlotte	Mediacorp Studios	VCD of idol drama, Dreamchaser【梦·拼图】
30 November 2006	从台北到北京 From Taipei to Beijing	Warner Music	Debut Album
December 2006	擱淺 with Chen Wei Lian	Warner Music	Part of a compilation for love duets, 心心相印
January 2007	从台北到北京	Warner Music	Part of a compilation for Best Of Number 1 Hits, 排行榜總冠軍 Best Of #1 Hits 2007
2 March 2007	从台北到北京 From Taipei to Beijing	Warner Music	Repackaged Version
14 September 2007	剧欣卉集 Sing the Best Drama	Warner Music (華納唱片), Mediacorp Studios	Compilation album of Mediacorp drama theme songs sung by
5 November 2008	我知道我变漂亮了 I Know I've Become Prettier	Warner Music	Super Countdown 2009 Compilation Album: Hit songs from 2008 to 2009
26 December 2008	女皇 Queen	Warner Music	Sophomore Studio Album
24 February 2009	女皇 Queen	Warner Music	Queen, Repackaged limited edition CD + DVD, includes music of video of 4 songs
10 March 2009	天冷就回来 If There're Seasons...	Warner Music (華納唱片), The Theatre Practice 实践剧场 (division of Practice Performing Arts Centre Ltd)	Original Soundtrack of Chinese Musical If There're Seasons... <<天冷就回来>> Solo Performances: 担心， 喜欢你 Duet Performances:深擁 你的倒影 and other group performances

=== Rank of songs on music charts ===
Song/Radio station	YES!933 Highest Ranking /Number of weeks on chart	Radio 1003 Highest Ranking /Number of weeks on chart
从台北到北京; From Taipei to Beijing	7 / 10	2 / 7
你给的; What You Had Given	8 / 9	7 / 7

== Awards and nominations ==
Year	Ceremony	Award	Nominated work	Results
2006	Star Awards	Best Theme Song	The Rainbow Connection	Nominated
2006	Star Awards	Top 10 Most Popular Female Artistes	—N/a	Top 20
2006	Star Awards	Best Newcomer	—N/a	Nominated
2007	Star Awards	Best Theme Song	The Greatest Love of All	Nominated
2009	Star Awards	Best Theme Song	Perfect Cut	Nominated
2017	Star Awards	Best Theme Song	The Dream Job	Nominated
