= Crime Busters x 2 =

Singaporean television program

- 叮当神探
- Genre: Police procedural
- Starring: Tay Ping Hui; Dawn Yeoh; Shaun Chen; Paige Chua; Jackson Tan
- Opening theme: "幻听" by Darren Tan Sze Wei
- Ending theme: "反方向" by 陈迪雅 & 杨佳盈 停顿 by Darren Tan Sze Wei
- Country of origin: Singapore
- Original language: Chinese
- No. of episodes: 20

Production
- Running time: approx. 45 minutes

Original release
- Network: MediaCorp TV Channel 8
- Release: 30 September – 27 October 2008

Crime Busters x 2 (Chinese: 叮当神探) is a Singaporean Chinese drama which was telecasted on Singapore's free-to-air channel, MediaCorp Channel 8. It made its debut on 30 September 2008 and ended on 27 October 2008. This drama serial consists of 20 episodes, and was screened on every weekday night at 9:00 pm.

== Plot ==
Xia Jingyi, nicknamed Xiaozhu ("Little Pig"), is a rookie cop with the Records Department of the Police Force and is constantly at loggerheads with her superior, Lü Daxiong. The aloof and temperamental Daxiong was transferred from the Criminal Investigation Department five years ago after a bungle during a police chase that resulted in the death of his partner.

Despite their differences, the duo helps in the investigation and solving of several cases; from the mystery of a man who died after a brush with a ghostly apparition, to the death of a reporter who was trying to uncover a child smuggling ring.

Yu Jie is a forensic pathologist with the CID. Her brother Yu Qing comes under investigation by the CID as he was tied to the death of a journalist threatening to expose the child smuggling syndicate he was believed to be a member of. Daxiong is secretly in love with Yu Jie but soon realises that she is hiding a deep dark secret about her past. While investigating the case he finds himself face to face one of his cold cases involving a mysterious criminal known as the "Surgical Maniac".

== Cast ==
=== Main cast ===
- Tay Ping Hui as Lü Daxiong (吕大雄)
- Dawn Yeoh as Xia Jingyi (夏静宜)
- Shaun Chen as Jiang Zaixi (姜在熙)
- Jackson Tan as Fu Dazhi (傅大志)
- Paige Chua as Yu Jie (于洁)

=== Supporting cast ===
- Michelle Chong as Yi Shabei (伊沙贝)
- Chen Guohua as Ah Zhu (阿祝)
- Zhang Yaodong as Yu Qing (于清)
- Brandon Wong as Du Jialong (杜家龙)
- Huang Wenyong as Xia Mingda (夏明达)
- Hong Huifang as Feng Huixin (冯慧欣)
- Richard Low as Lü Duofu (吕多福)
- Mariana as Cantik
- Joey Swee as Lü Baoliang (吕宝亮)
- Nick Shen as Sun Jiqing (孙继青)
- Pan Lingling as Wang Yumei (王玉美)
- Jerry Yeo as Lin Zhengwei (林正为)
- Celest Chong as Margaret
- Joshua Ang as Xiaogou
- Alan Tern as Tang Jiasheng (唐佳声)
- Rayson Tan as Xue Youren (薛友仁)
- Rebecca Lim as Hu Huadie (胡花蝶/彩蝶)
- Jesseca Liu as Dr Ou Fenni (欧芬妮)
- Henry Heng as Prof Chen Xiangzhong (陈祥忠)
- Desmond Tan as Dr Hu Zhiyang (胡志扬)

== See also ==
- List of programmes broadcast by Mediacorp Channel 8
