= Honour and Passion =

Singaporean television drama series

- 宝家卫国
- Genre: Contemporary; Romance; Military
- Directed by: 林坤辉 黎致明
- Starring: Tay Ping Hui; Bryan Wong; Huang Wenyong; Hong Huifang; Felicia Chin; Rui En; Pierre Png; Dawn Yeoh; Nat Ho
- Opening theme: 跟着我一起 by Le Sheng 乐声 and Zhang Jialiang & Tay Ping Hui 郑斌辉
- Ending theme: 1) 握手的距离 by Tay Ping Hui 郑斌辉; 2) 体谅 by Tay Ping Hui 郑斌辉, Bryan Wong 王禄江, Huang Wenyong 黃文永, Felicia Chin 陈凤玲 & Dawn Yeoh 姚懿珊; 3) I Believe by Redwan Ali
- Country of origin: Singapore
- Original languages: Chinese, with some English dialogues
- No. of episodes: 20

Production
- Running time: approx. 45 minutes

Original release
- Network: MediaCorp Channel 8
- Release: July 24 – August 20, 2007

Related
- Switched!; Like Father, Like Daughter; When Duty Calls (2017)

Honour and Passion (simplified Chinese: 宝家卫国; traditional Chinese: 寶家衛國; pinyin: Bǎo jiā weì guó) was a Singaporean Chinese television drama series that aired on Mediacorp's Channel 8, and was sponsored by the Singapore Ministry of Defence. This series consisted of 20 episodes, and ran from 24 July 2007 to 20 August 2007.

== Plots ==
The series revolves around a Singaporean family of five, the Pos, who are deeply involved with the nation's Armed Forces.

=== Pengju ===
The family patriarch, Pengju, is a Regimental sergeant major with the Armed Forces. Having lost his wife a long time ago, Pengju raised his four kids as a single parent, and runs his family under strict rules. Pengju is the love interest of Liu Yamei, a chief clerk for the army. Yamei has been close friends with Pengju for years, and also takes care of the family. She has also rejected many matches made by matchmakers, out of a desire to wait for Pengju to reciprocate her love. Pengju, however, is hesitant when it came to Yamei, because of his late wife.

=== Wenzhong ===
Wenzhong is an NSman who works in IT. He is considered to be the peacemaker within the family. He is the love interest of Amy, who fell for Wenzhong after witnessing his care and understanding towards her and her son. The love, however, is unrequited.

Due to a misunderstanding, Wenzhong got to know Liang Xiaonuo, a handicapped woman from Malaysia. She was hesitant in reciprocating Wenzhong's love, because she is still troubled over her being the cause of her boyfriend's death, only accepting Wenzhong after he risked his life to save her. Pengju, however, had trouble accepting her son dating a handicapped person, which led to a falling out. With help from Yamei, however, Pengju eventually accepts Xiaonuo.

Wenzhong and Xiaonuo's tie-up, however, led to Peipei's depression, but also led to Peipei's tie-up with Wenjing.

=== Wenjing ===
Of the four sons, Wenjing is Pengju's pride and joy, and is much valued by the Armed Forces, due to his skills as a commando. However, his mind turns blank when he encounters women he likes. Thus, he puts on a cool front to hide his embarrassment. That is also something that became a turnoff for Ouyang Peipei, a female captain and instruction at the School of Artillery. Despite the rough start, Wenjing and Peipei would end up being together, after she was rejected by Wenzhong.

=== Wenguo ===
Wenguo is a recent polytechnic graduate will later enter National Service. Wenguo is prepared for induction by his father, despite Wenguo's frustration. Adding to Wenguo's frustration is the fact that Pengju frequently compares Wenguo to his two older brothers. After induction, however, Wenguo realised his father's training was beneficial.

=== Wenwei ===
Wenwei, the only female in the family, works in advertising, which is also where she met Picasso and Wu Chengyi. Picasso, despite getting off to a bad start with Wenwei, eventually developed a rapport, as well as a relation, with Wenwei. Chengyi got off to a good start with Wenwei, but kept Wenwei at arm's length because of his mission. It turns out Chengyi is a terrorist group member, with a mission to rescue his brother, who is on death row. Wenwei, who eventually discovered the secret, was taken hostage by Chengyi, and Picasso, along with Wenjing, had to save her.

== Cast ==
- Huang Wenyong as 宝鹏举 Po Pengju. A Warrant Officer in the army, the father of four had to raise the children alone (with help from Liu Yamei) after his wife died years ago. He cares for his children, but maintains a strict regimen in his household, running his family like a military camp, even to his daughter. It did not take long before his own children start to resent his such behaviour.
- Hong Huifang as 刘亚妹 Liu Yamei. The sister of Po Pengju's wife and also a chief clerk in the Army, who promised to help Pengju raise his four children before Pengju's wife died. She is effectively the mother figure in the family for years but Pengju does not regard her as a part of the family, merely as a friend. She loves Pengju secretly, and refused all other romantic advances.
- Tay Ping Hui as 宝文精 Po Wenjing. The elder son in the family. He followed his father's footstep, and pursued a professional Army career. He is considered to be an outstanding soldier, but he is crippled on the romance front, being not able to profess his true love to a fellow Army officer, Ouyang Peipei.
- Rui En as 宝文卫 Po Wenwei The only daughter in the family, she was raised like a boy ever since her mother died, and this has caused her to act more like a man than a woman. Her ex-boyfriend cheated on her and broke up with her for that very reason, and this was a source of conflict for the family early on in the series. Her job at an advertising agency allowed her to work with her future love interest – One of them being Wu Chengyi, who was later revealed to be a terrorist, and another being Picasso, whom she fell in love with much later on.
- Bryan Wong as 宝文忠 Po Wenzhong The second son in the family, he works in a computer company after his NS stint. He acts as the mediator in the family during family arguments. His caring personality has attracted love interests, even unwanted ones.
- Nathaniel Ho as 宝文国 Po Wenguo The youngest son in the family, he is about to serve his NS stint after graduating from school. He is drilled heavily by his father before he has to serve his NS stint, and this has created conflict between Wenguo and his father.

=== Other characters ===
- Ouyang Peipei (欧阳佩佩, portrayed by Felicia Chin (陈靓瑄, credited as 陈凤玲))- An instructor at the Army Artillery School, she maintains a feisty surface, but is tender and funny inside. She has a crush on Po Wenzhong since Secondary School. Wenzhong's elder brother, Wenjing, has a secret crush on Peipei, but she does not appear to be interested initially. Her crush on Wenzhong almost cost her her life, when she was attacked by a woman whose love for Wenzhong was unrequited (see below).
- Amy Lim (portrayed by Constance Song (宋怡霏))- A mentally unstable divorced woman who crossed paths with Wenzhong during a business venture. She loves Wenzhong, but the love is not mutual. Thinking that Ouyang Peipei is the one who stole Wenzhong from her, she attacked Peipei, and was committed to a mental facility as a result.
- Picasso So Jianwei (苏健威, portrayed by Pierre Png (方展发))- A worker in Po Wenwei's ad agency, he was hired because of his close relations to Wenwei's boss. Picasso has a rather stingy and slack personality on the surface, and this has brought criticisms from his co-workers. However, it turns out that his stingy demeanors are a result of his fraternal brother's incapacity, in which Picasso promised to save money to help out his brother, so that he doesn't starve. He has crossed path with Wenwei several times before they worked in the same company, each time ending in conflict.
- Ben Phua (portrayed by Vincent Ng)- The fraternal brother of Picasso So. He got to know Picasso during their NS stints. They were assigned to the same sections, and immediately became best partners. During a shopping trip for his new son, Ben was thrown off a pedestrian bridge after he tried to subdue a thief, and was crippled as a result.
- Liang Xiaonuo (梁小诺, portrayed by Dawn Yeoh (姚懿珊))- Xiaonuo got to know Wenzhong in a neighbouring country, following a misunderstanding, and is his love interest. However, Xiaonuo was not able to forgive herself for causing the death of her ex-boyfriend, and is conscious of her disability. It was after Wenzhong risked his life to save Xiaonuo that she accepted his advances, but the relationship caused a rift between Wenzhong and his father.
- Wu Chengyi (巫成义, portrayed by Ix Shen (沈倾掞))- The antagonist of the series, he is the love interest of Wenwei. He is revealed to be a terrorist. However, towards the end of the show he does show that he still has a conscience
- Ken, portrayed by Bernard Tan
