= Huang Shi Nan =

Singaporean actor (born 1961)

- Born: Wee Sei Lum; 23 May 1961 (age 64); Singapore
- Other names: Shi Nan Huang
- Occupations: Actor; Host; Amateur singer; Entrepreneur
- Years active: 1984–present
- Agent: Mediacorp (1984–present)
- Notable work: When Hearts Touch; My Home Affairs; Beautiful Connection
- Spouse: Pan Lingling (m. 1996)
- Musical career
- Genres: Mandopop

Chinese name
- Traditional Chinese: 黃世南
- Simplified Chinese: 黄世南
- Hanyu Pinyin: Huáng Shì Nán

Huang Shi Nan (born 23 May 1961) is a Singaporean actor, host, amateur singer, entrepreneur. Huang is a former Mediacorp The Celebrity Agency artiste.

== Career ==
In 1984, Huang graduated from Singapore Broadcasting Corporation's 6th Artistes Training Course.

== Personal life ==
Huang married actress Pan Lingling in December 1996. They have two sons, born in 1999 and 2002.

== Filmography ==
=== Television series ===
Year	Title	Role	Notes	Ref
1985	Son of Pulau Tekong			
1985	Takeover 人在旅途	Huang Ziqin 黄自勤		
1985	The Young Heroes 少年英雄	Liu Guan Xiong 刘冠雄		
1985	Home is Where Love is 吾爱吾家			
1985	The Coffee Shop 咖啡乌			
1986	Happy Trio 青春123			
1986	Men of Valour 盗日英雄传	Song Gao Zong 宋高宗		
1986	Family Hour Drama 我爱旧家园			
1986	Crossroads 红绿灯			
1986	First Step 踏上征途			
1986	The Sword and the Song	Li Hong Yi 李弘冀		
1986	Five Foot Away 五脚基	Wu Weiren 胡为仁		
1986	Neighbours 芝麻绿豆			
1987	Sunshine After Rain 雨过天晴			
1987	Fury of the Dragon 冷月剑无言	Long Si 龙四		
1987	I Do 君子好逑	Liu Yi Fan 刘一帆		
1987	Pickpockets 提防小手			
1987	Strange Encounters 奇缘之剑魂	Ou Yang Ce 欧阳策		
1988	Silk and Satin 云想衣裳	Chen Jia Ming 陈家明		
1988	Heiress 世纪情	Chen Da Wen 陈大文		
1988	Mystery 迷离夜之梦	Shi Shao Cong 施少聪		
1988	When Hearts Touch 似水柔情	Zhang Bo Lin 张柏林		
1989	Patrol 铁警雄风	Ji Gang 纪刚		
1989	The Sword Rules 剑断江湖	Xu Bao Bao 徐宝宝		
1989	My Daughters' Three 芳华满一家	Rong Jia Chang 容家昌		
1989	We are Family 四代同堂			
1990	Wishing Well 幻海奇遇			
1990	Two of Us 天生一对	He Yi Kang 何以康		
1990	Enchanted Eyes 天眼	Chen Zhuo Nan 陈卓南		
1990	Marry Me 最佳配偶			
1991	The Working Class 上班一族			
1992	The Dating Game 爱情乒乓球			
1992	Love Is in the Air 爱在女儿乡	Tang Yuan Yuan 唐元元		
1994	My Destiny With You 缘来是你			
1994	Tofu Street			
1994	Chronicle of Life 缘尽今生			
1994	Coffee or Tea 是非屋			
1994	Neighbourhood Heroes 大英雄小人物			
1994	Web of Deceit 鹤啸九天	Zhu Che 朱彻		
1995	Silk and Romance 情丝万缕	Hong Hua 洪华		
1995	The Morning Express 阳光列车	Luo Wei Ming 罗伟明		
1995	Sparks of Life 生命火花	Prosecutor Zhang 张检察官		
1996	The Unbroken Cycle 解连环	Professor Xu 徐教授		
1996	The Unbeatables II	Liang Mu 梁幕		
1996	Give Me a Break 老板放轻松	Mr Tian 田先生		
1997	My Wife, Your Wife, Their Wives 101老婆	Zhao Yong Ming 赵永明		
1997	Playing to Win Uncle当自强			
1998	My Little Angel 我家小豆豆			
1998	Facing the Music 钢琴88			
1998	Act 235 刑事235			
1998	The Guest People			
1998	God of Fortune 财神爷			
1998	The Legends of the Eight Immortals 东游记	Tongtian Leader 通天教主		
1998	The Return of the Condor Heroes 1998	Gong Sun Zhi 公孙止		
1999	From the Courtroom 法庭故事			
1999	Nao Nao Story 闹闹的故事			
1999	Darling-In-Law 我的岳母是巫婆			
1999	My Grandpa 公公，你的名字好难叫			
1999	Stepping Out			
2000	Adam's Company 亚当周记	Patrick		
2000	My Home Affairs 家事	Hong Jian Guo 洪建国		
2000	The Legendary Swordsman 2000	Xiang Wentian 向问天		
2000	Knotty Liaison 爱情百科			
2000	The Voices Within 心灵物语			
2000	Hainan Kopi Tales			
2000	The Stratagem			
2000	Remember Childhood 记得小时候			
2000	Super Troopers			
2001	Love Me, Love Me Not 真爱无敌			
2001	The Hotel	Zhang Dage Tiger		
2001	In Pursuit of Peace	Ah Shi 阿实		
2002	The Vagrant	David 杜伟		
2002	Viva Le Famille			
2002	The Wing of Desire 天使的诱惑			
	Beautiful Connection	Jiang Xue Liang 蒋学梁		
2003	Love is Beautiful	Chen Zhongwei 陈仲威		
2003	Health Matters 一切由慎开始II			
2003	Viva Le Famille 2			
2003	A Child's Hope			
2003	The Crime Hunters			
2003	To Mum with Love			
2003	A Toast of Love			
2004	Room in My Heart	Ding Wenjie 丁文杰		
2004	A Child's Hope 2			
2005	Jin Tian 金田			
2006	The Undisclosed	Ivan 艾文		
2006	House of Joy			
2007	Let It Shine			
2007	Happily Ever After	God of Fortune 财神爷		
2007	Making Miracles			
2007	Mars vs Venus			
2007	Honour and Passion			
2007	Live Again	Nelson Teo		
2008	Addicted to Love	Zeng Shijie 曾世杰		
2009	The Ultimatum			
2010	The Score	Hong Shichuan 洪世川		
2012	Joys of Life	Fans 粉丝		
2012	Don't Stop Believin'	Ken		
2012	Game Plan	Wang Pao 王豹		
2014	Yes We Can!	Mr Feng 冯先生		
2014	You Can Be an Angel 你也可以是天使	Liang Zhanpeng 梁展鹏		

=== Film ===
Year	Title	Role	Notes	Ref
1995	War Roses (爱在漫天烽火时)	Shan Xia Yi Nan	Telemovie	
2010	Love Cuts	Restaurant customer	Cameo	
2011	The Ultimate Winner	Tiancai's father	Cameo	

=== Programmes ===
Year	Network	Title	Episode	Notes	Ref
2001	Mediacorp TV Channel 8	City Network 都市新干线	Whole Session	Host	
2002	Mediacorp TV Channel 8	Golden Age 黄金年华	Whole Session	Host	
2022	Mediacorp Channel 8	Retire Well with MoneySense 钱不怕退休	1Episode	Guest	

=== Discography ===
Year	Album title	Song title	Co-artistes	Notes
2007	Mediacorp Lunar New Year Album 新传媒群星贺岁《金猪庆丰年》	Xin Nian Hao Yun Dao/ Bao Zhu Yi Sheng Da Di Chun 新年好运到/爆竹一声大地春	Pan Lingling，Chen Liping，Xiang Yun，Edmund Chen，Hong Huifang，Zheng Geping ，Rayson Tan	Compilation Album
