= Ye Shipin =

Singaporean actor (born 1959)

- Born: 12 February 1959 (age 67); Johor Bahru, Malaysia
- Occupation: Actor
- Years active: 1983−present

Chinese name
- Traditional Chinese: 葉世品
- Simplified Chinese: 叶世品
- Hanyu Pinyin: Yè Shìpǐn

Ye Shipin (born 12 February 1959) is a television actor based in Singapore.

== Career ==
Ye joined Singapore Broadcasting Corporation in August 1984.

In 2016, Ye did not renew his contract with Mediacorp after 32 years working with it.

After leaving Mediacorp, Ye formed his own entertainment company.

In 2021, Chen Tianwen launched ready to eat meals branded as Mr Lazy Bum with three partners, including Ye.

== Personal life ==
In October 1990, Ye was engaged. Ye has two sons.

== Selected filmography ==
Year	Title	Role	Notes	Ref.
1986	Men of Valour 盗日英雄传			
1989	Splash to Victory	Liang Chaoming		
1990	When Dawn Breaks 乱世黎明			
1995	The Golden Pillow			
1995	Dr Justice II 法醫故事II			
1996	Tofu Street			
1996	The Unbroken Cycle			
1996	Triad Justice 飛越珍珠坊			
1996	Marriage, Dollars and Sense 5C老公			
1997	The Silver Lining			
1997	The Prime Years 創業興家			
1998	Act 235 刑事235			
1998	Season of Love			
1999	Wok of Life			
2001	In Pursuit of Peace			
2001	Beyond the Axis of Truth			
2001	The Hotel			
2003	True Heroes	Hui Ge		
2005	Zero to Hero			
2005	Beyond the Axis of Truth II			
2005	Destiny	Zhao Shiquan		
2006	C.I.D			
2007	Mars VS Venus			
2007	Live Again	Da Tou Cai		
2011	Prosperity			
2014-2015	118	Steven/Uncle Steven		
2015	Mind Game			
2016-2017	118 II	Steven/Uncle Steven		
2018	118 Reunion	Steven/Uncle Steven		
2023	All That Glitters			

Film
Year	Title	Role	Notes	Ref.
2003	Infernal Affairs II	Socialite	Cameo	
2021	Malam	Seow		
2023	Wonderland			
