= C.I.D. (Singaporean TV series) =

- 刑警2人组
- Genre: Police procedural
- Written by: Liew Kwee Lan 刘桂兰; Tang Yeow 陈耀
- Directed by: Chong Liung Man
- Starring: Tay Ping Hui; Qi Yuwu; Apple Hong; Jeanette Aw; Ong Ai Leng; Brandon Wong; Zhang Yaodong
- Opening theme: 刮目相看 by Gary Chaw
- Country of origin: Singapore
- Original language: Chinese
- No. of episodes: 20

Production
- Running time: approx. 45 minutes per episode

Original release
- Network: MediaCorp Channel 8
- Release: 12 June – 7 July 2006

C.I.D. (刑警2人组) is a Singaporean police drama which aired in 2006 on MediaCorp Channel 8. It stars Tay Ping Hui, Qi Yuwu, Apple Hong, Jeanette Aw, Ong Ai Leng, Brandon Wong and Zhang Yaodong as the cast of this series.

The series was directed by Chong Liung Man (张龙敏) and starred Tay Ping Hui and Qi Yuwu in the main lead roles. 5 years later, Chong would go on to direct award-winning police blockbuster C.L.I.F., which also features Tay and Qi in the main roles as colleagues in the CID. Rare for a locally produced drama, certain scenes were filmed on location outside Southeast Asia; there were several scenes which took place in Taiwan and were filmed in the country itself.

== Plot ==
Sean is a CID officer and team leader. Together with his elite team of investigators, Zhang Zhihua, Lin Yaoshan and Wu Guoxiong, and forensic scientist Fang Jiayi, they tackle several cases.

The first case involves a string of triad execution-style murders tied with the notorious local triad. They are traced to a man called Tang Siwei, who is a member of Xiang Dahai's gang. Xiang Dahai ("Hai-ge") is a notorious "ah long" and head of the local syndicate. Recently, one of his men Lin Chenghui has been down on his luck and had several operations and gambling dens shut down. His partner is Tang Siwei, whom the CID has been tracking down. The murder count keeps piling up and evidence shows Tang Siwei is not the killer. The police manage to close down the syndicate and arrest Hai-ge. To Sean's shock, Siwei is actually a fellow CID officer who went undercover as a gang member as part of a dangerous covert operation to crack down on the local triads. After Chenghui was killed by another triad member, Siwei took it upon himself to help Chenghui's widow out guilt and compassion but did not disclose his occupation so that they would accept his help.

Tang Siwei's boss decides to transfer him to Sean's team. Although highly competent and intelligent, his aloof and seemingly anti-social nature makes the rest of the team feel uncomfortable. Sean and Siwei's relationship got off to a terrible start as they had locked horns several times before Siwei's transfer. Eventually, Siwei earns his colleagues' respect and is well-regarded by Sean. Siwei meets Fang Jiayi, the resident forensic expert, and mistook her for his missing sister. Unknown to the both of them, Siwei's mother and Jiayi's father have been hiding a deep dark secret for almost two decades.

The team are called to a case involving a suspected suicide attempt. Sean's university mate Steve was found dead in Sean's car. The breaks had been tampered with and Steve had no reason to commit suicide. After hitting several dead ends, they trace a lead to a mysterious young Thai woman with an equally mysterious background.

Lin Chenghui's wife works at the local neighbourhood coffee shop. The boss, Lin Zaifa, has a very public affair with Liu Cailian, one of the waitresses. She and her husband Li Fuzhong have a very complex relationship. Frustrated by his wife's looseness, Fuzhong often takes out his anger on Cailian's daughter Qingqing. The impudent Cailian is oblivious of all the gossip she has been raising and of the fact that Zaifa has attempted to molest her daughter and continues to humiliate Fuzhong publicly. Sean's mother offers to take in the girl but she disappears one night. Qingqing's decomposing corpse was found in the woods but the team keeps hitting a dead end with each suspect.

Chenghui's younger brother Chenggong has been getting into trouble lately by roaming around the HDB estates with some fellow school drop-outs and delinquents. Sean and his team find it difficult to rein them in as they have little or no regard for authority. Meanwhile, Jiayi has been persistently trying to dig up her past and realises that she is not Fang Honglie's biological daughter. She later receives some news that will change her life forever.

== Cast ==
- Tay Ping Hui as Chen Long 陈龙 (Sean)
- Qi Yuwu as Tang Siwei 唐思伟
- Ivy Lee as Ye Xue 叶雪, Chenghui's wife
- Jeanette Aw as Fang Jiayi 方佳宜 (Tang Sijie)
- Brandon Wong as Zhang Zhihua 张志华
- Ong Ai Leng as Lin Yaoshan 林耀珊 (013)
- Zhang Yaodong as Wu Guoxiong 吴国雄 ("Ah Boy")
- Apple Hong as Long Liwen 龙丽雯

=== Supporting cast ===
- Ye Shipin as Xiang Dahai 向大海
- Shaun Chen as Lin Chenghui 林成辉
- Nick Shen as Fly
- John Cheng as Wu Jianbiao 阿标
- Regene Lim as Lin Hongxi 林小汐, Chenghui and Ye Xue's daughter
- Rayson Tan as Supt Huang, Siwei's boss
- Richard Low as Fang Honglie 方鸿烈/Fang Qiang, Jiayi's father
- Jin Yinji as Chen Fengjiao 陈凤娇, Sean's mother
- Zhu Houren as Tang Jiannian 唐健年, Siwei's father
- Lin Meijiao as Sun Lifeng 孙丽凤, Siwei's mother
- Constance Song as Tata/Dawn
- Allan Wu as Steve Chong
- Belinda Lee as Lu Xiaofen 陆晓芬, Steve's wife
- Alan Tern as Zhang Jiasheng 张家声
- Yang Libing as Liu Cailian
- Yan Bingliang as Lin Zaifa 林再发, coffee shop boss
- Chen Tianwen as Li Fuzhong
- Romeo Tan as Billy
- Elyn Chong as Eve
- Cheryl Chan as Tana
- Huang Wanxian as Suki Tan

=== Cameo ===
- Pan Lingling as He Meiyun, Tang Jiannian's ex-lover
- Li Jiaxun as younger Tang Siwei

== Awards and nominations ==
Year	Award	Category	Nominee	Result	Ref
2006	Star Awards	Best Actor	Tay Ping Hui	Nominated	
2006	Star Awards	Best Actor	Qi Yuwu	Nominated	
2006	Star Awards	Best Supporting Actor	Shaun Chen	Nominated	
2006	Star Awards	Best Supporting Actress	Constance Song	Nominated	
2006	Star Awards	Best Drama Serial	—N/a	Nominated	
2006	Star Awards	Best Director	Chong Liung Man 张龙敏	Won	
