= Jin Yinji =

Singaporean actress

- Born: Gam Ngan Gei; 3 August 1947 (age 79); South Korea
- Other name: JYJ
- Occupations: Actress; singer; dancer; businesswoman
- Years active: 1986–present
- Spouse: Anthony Lee (m. 1972; died 2023)
- Children: 2
- Awards: Star Awards 2018 : Top 10 Most Popular Female Artistes; Star Awards 2021 : Top 10 Most Popular Female Artistes; Star Awards 2021 : Best Evergreen Artiste

Chinese name
- Traditional Chinese: 金銀姬
- Simplified Chinese: 金银姬
- Hanyu Pinyin: Jīn Yínjī

Jin Yinji (born Gam Ngan Gei on 3 August 1947) (Note: Jin celebrated her 75th lunar birthday on 26 July 2021. 26 July 2021, on the Gregorian calendar translates to 17 June 2021, on the lunar calendar. Working backwards, accounting for typical starting count of age of 1 from birth, her lunar date of birth is 17 June 1947, which translates to 3 August 1947 on the Gregorian calendar. This corresponds to her Chinese zodiac, pig.) is a Singaporean actress of South Korean descent, who was a full-time Mediacorp artiste from 1986 to 2017.

== Early life ==
Jin Yinji was born in South Korea, and had 10 other siblings.

== Career ==
=== As a singer ===
When Jin was 17 (1964–65), she left South Korea to find her two elder sisters in Taiwan. As she was interested in singing, she participated in a singing competition and came in second. She decided to make singing her occupation in Taiwan. Later in March 1972, Jin went to Singapore to further her career.

=== As an actress ===
In 1986, Jin made her acting debut in Neighbours. Later, Jin was nominated for a popularity award, Top 10 Most Popular Female Artistes in Star Awards 2004 as she acted in numerous drama serials for the past two years. After 11 years of veteran acting, Jin was finally nominated for Best Supporting Actress in Star Awards 2013 for her role in It Takes Two and managed to be one of the lead actresses in a 2015 family drama series, Super Senior.

Jin's contract with Mediacorp was due to expire in February 2017. She was allegedly told to take a pay cut and was compared to a "$50-an-hour bit player." She later clarified that the remark was made over 10 years ago and has since settled the fiasco with Mediacorp with details of her new contract unknown.

In 2017, Jin appeared in 2 dramas, The Lead and My Teacher Is a Thug.

In February 2017, Jin left Mediacorp as a full-time artiste after being signed to the company for three decades.

In Star Awards 2018, Jin won her first Top 10 Most Popular Female Artistes award after being nominated but failed to win any after several years.

In 2018, Jin was cast in Life Less Ordinary, Fifty & Fabulous and Magic Chef.

In 2019, she appeared in the dramas Heart To Heart, Hello From The Other Side, Dear Neighbours, All is Well- Singapore and After The Stars.

At the Star Awards 2021, Jin received the Evergreen Award and a second Top 10 Most Popular Female Artistes, after the first one in 2018.

In October 2022, Jin appeared in an advertorial for McDonald's, alongside actor-singer Tosh Zhang. In April 2023, she appeared in another campaign for the food fast chain with actress Yoo Ah Min (aka "Lao Zha Bor").

=== Business venture ===
In 2020, Jin started the brand Gold Kimchi, selling home made kimchi with her Korean daughter-in-law Cloe Han from their home.

== Personal life ==
On 27 January 1972, Jin married Anthony Lee, a Singaporean antique dealer. Jin and Lee were introduced by friends when she came to Singapore from Taiwan in March 1971. Together, they have two children, a son and a daughter. Originally a South Korean citizen, Jin was naturalised as a Singaporean citizen when she was 26 (1973–74).

On 10 October 2023, Jin's husband Anthony Lee died of heart attack, at the age of 83.

== Filmography ==
=== Television series ===
Year	Title	Role	Notes	Ref.
1986	Neighbours (芝麻绿豆)			
1988	We are Family (四代同堂)			
1988	Teahouse in Chinatown (牛车水人家)			
1988	Ups and Downs (婚姻保险)			
1988	Strange Encounters 2 (奇缘2 之《错系红线》)			
1989	The Fortune Hunters (钻石人生)			
1989	Song of Youth (生活歌手)			
1989	Good Morning, Sir!			
1989	Return of the Prince (丝路迷城)			
1990	Friends Next Door (我爱芳邻)			
1990	The Village Hero (大吉传奇)			
1990	Sweet Dreams (欣欣向荣)			
1990	Navy (壮志豪情)			
1991	The Working Class (上班一族)			
1991	The Darkest Hour (烈血青春)			
1991	Home Sweet Home (宜家宜乐)			
1991	The Other Woman (醋劲100)			
1991	Secret Operation (急转弯)			
1991	The Woman I Marry (家有恶妻)			
1991	Pretty Faces (三面夏娃)			
1991	Guardian Angel (爸爸怕怕)			
1992	Memories of June (六月的童话)			
1992	Between Friends (山水喜相逢)			
1992	Crime and Passion (执法先锋)			
1992	Male Syndrome (妙男正传)			
1992	Lady Steel (激情女大亨)			
1992	Mystery II (迷离夜II 之《问我是谁》)			
1993	The Brave One (荡寇英雄)			
1993	Sister Dearest (傻妹俏娇娃)			
1993	The Young and the Restless (俏皮战士)			
1993	Happy Reunion (年年有鱼)			
1994	Young Justice Bao (侠义包公)			
1994	Fiery of Lover (烈火情人)			
1994	Dr Justice (法医故事)			
1995	Neighbourhood Heroes (大英雄小人物)			
1995	Chronicle of Life (缘尽今生)			
1995	Strange Encounters III (奇缘3 之《灶神》、《门神》)			
1995	Dream Hunters (追心一族)			
1995	The Teochew Family			
1995	Sparks of Life (生命火花)			
1995	The Golden Pillow (金枕头)			
1995	Dr Justice II (法医故事II)			
1996	Triad Justice (飞越珍珠坊)			
1996	Kung Fu Master 1996 (掌门人1996)			
1996	Diary of a Teacher (老师日记)			
1997	The Choice Partner (错爱今生)			
1997	The Prime Years (创业兴家)			
1997	My Wife, Your Wife, Their Wives – "My Dear Mother" 101 (老婆 之《大妈二妈我的妈》))			
1998	Facing the Music (钢琴88)			
1998	My Teacher, Aiyoyo! (哎哟哟奇妙假期)			
1998	Driven by a Car (欲望街车)			
1998	The New Adventures of Wisely (卫斯理传奇)			
1999	From the Medical Files 2 (医生档案II)	Yuhui's mother		
1999	Wok of Life (福满人间)			
2000	The Voices Within (心灵物语)			
2000	The Legendary Swordsman (笑傲江湖)			
2001	The Hotel			
2002	Health Matters			
2002	Viva Le Famille			
2002	Katong Miss Oh (加东Miss Oh)			
2002	No Problem! (考试家族)			
2002	Fantasy (星梦情真)			
2002	The Unbeatables III	Auntie Qian		
2002	Springs of Life	Grandma Wu		
2002	My Genie (我爱精灵2)			
2003	True Heroes	Chen Meizhen		
2003	Love is Beautiful (美丽家庭)			
2003	My In-Laws (我的岳父岳母)			
2004	The Crime Hunters			
2004	Double Happiness	Da-ma		
2005	Zero to Hero	Jizu's 6th great-grandmother		
2005	A New Life	Youfu's mother		
2005	Baby Blues	Yang Shuilian		
2006	C.I.D.	Chen Fengjiao		
2006	An Enchanted Life	Chen Yuchun		
2006	House of Joy	Wang Xiulian		
2007	Happily Ever After	Ah Jin		
2007	Switched!	Liu Yujuan		
2007	Like Father, Like Daughter	Guai Po Po		
2007	Honour and Passion	Mrs Ouyang		
2007	Live Again	Mummy Chen		
2008	Taste of Love	Yan Meishu		
2008	Love Blossoms	Su Baozuan		
2008	Love Blossoms II	Su Baozuan		
2009	Your Hand In Mine	Lan Jinyin		
2010	Priceless Wonder	Chen Qiao-e		
2011	The In-Laws	He Xiangqin		
2011	A Song to Remember	Ba-Jie		
2012	Show Hand (注定)	Zhang Lili		
2012	It Takes Two	Hao Qiuxia		
2013	96°C Cafe	Xu Chang'er		
2013	Gonna Make It	Su Chenxi		
2014	The Caregivers (MISSY 先生)	Liu Tianzhen		
2014	118	Mary Wong		
2014	Three Wishes	Yang Bamei		
2015	Super Senior	Jin Huixi		
2015	Going Home (回家走走3)	Herself		
2016	The Gentlemen	He Zhaodi		
2016	Hero	Granny Swordswoman		
2017	The Lead	Fang Yahua		
2017	My Teacher Is A Thug	Zhuang Mingzhu		
2017	Life Less Ordinary	Liu Lianhua		
2018	Fifty & Fabulous (五零高手)	Mary		
2018	Magic Chef (料理人生)	Lin Qingfeng		
2018	Heart To Heart (心点心)	Ming Shen		
2019	Hello From The Other Side (阴错阳差)	Niu Yuliang		
2019	Dear Neighbours (我的左领右里)	Ping Yi		
2019	I See You (看见看不见的你)	Xu Xiuyue		
2019	All is Well- Singapore (你那边怎样，我这边OK)	Eric's grandmother		
2020	My Guardian Angels (单翼天使)	Shen Chunmei		
2020	Recipe of Life (味之道)	Gui Xiang		
2021	My Star Bride	Zhenzhu		
2022	Healing Heroes (医生不是神)	Li Youyu		
2023	Strike Gold	Grandma Dudu		
2023	Cash on Delivery	Zhu-ma		

=== Film ===
Year	Title	Role	Notes	Ref.
1994	Love Dowry (爱情订金)		Telemovie	
1995	When A Child is Born (有儿万事足)		Telemovie	

== Awards and nominations ==
Year	Ceremony	Category	Nominated work	Result	Ref
2004	Star Awards	Top 10 Most Popular Female Artistes	—N/a	Nominated	
2005	Star Awards	Top 10 Most Popular Female Artistes	—N/a	Nominated	
2009	Star Awards	Top 10 Most Popular Female Artistes	—N/a	Nominated	
2010	Star Awards	Top 10 Most Popular Female Artistes	—N/a	Nominated	
2013	Star Awards	Top 10 Most Popular Female Artistes	—N/a	Nominated	
2013	Star Awards	Best Supporting Actress	It Takes Two (as Lin Jinzhi)	Nominated	
2014	Star Awards	Top 10 Most Popular Female Artistes	—N/a	Nominated	
2015	Star Awards	Top 10 Most Popular Female Artistes	—N/a	Nominated	
2016	Star Awards	Top 10 Most Popular Female Artistes	—N/a	Nominated	
2018	Star Awards	Top 10 Most Popular Female Artistes	—N/a	Won	
2021	Star Awards	Best Evergreen Artiste	—N/a	Won	
2021	Star Awards	Top 10 Most Popular Female Artistes	—N/a	Won	
2022	Star Awards	Top 10 Most Popular Female Artistes	—N/a	Nominated	
2024	Star Awards	Best Supporting Actress	Cash on Delivery (as Ah Zhu)	Nominated	
