= Timeless Gift =

Timeless Gift (Chinese: 遗情未了) is a 2004 Chinese television series which aired in Singapore. It was produced by Mediacorp TV Channel 8.

The serial starred Christopher Lee, Huang Bi Ren, Michelle Chong, Patricia Mok, Zhang Xinxiang, Joey Swee, Rayson Tan, Li Yinzhu and Chen Shucheng.

== Nominations ==
The drama serial earned some nominations in the Star Awards 2004:

| Nominee | Award | Result |
|---|---|---|
| Christopher Lee 李铭顺 | Best Actor 最佳男主角 | Nominated |
| Zhang Xinxiang | Best Supporting Actor 最佳男配角 | Nominated |
| Chen Xingyu 陈星余 | Young Talent Award 青平果奖 | Nominated |
| —N/a | Best Theme Song 最佳主题曲 | Nominated |

== Reception ==
Mak Mun San of The Straits Times penned a mostly negative review, writing, "To be fair, there are enough twists and turns in the plots to keep you mildly entertained. Sadly, all the efforts of the scriptwriters go down the drain, no thanks to the never-ending histrionics. The result? Just imagine the worst moments of Taiwanese Hokkien dramas and Korean tearjerkers rolled into one painful package."
