= Zhenxiang =

Zhenxiang may refer to:

- Zhenxiang, Heilongjiang (祯祥), a town in Qinggang County, Heilongjiang, China
- Angel's Dream, a 2000 Singaporean TV series
- The Other Truth, a 2011 Hong Kong TV series
