= Beyond the aXis of Truth II =

- 法医X档案 2
- Genre: Police procedural Mystery
- Directed by: Loo Yin Kam 卢燕金; Chong Liung Man 张龙敏; Fang Jiafu 方家福
- Starring: Edmund Chen; Ivy Lee; Ye Shipin; Nick Shen; Stella Ng
- Country of origin: Singapore
- Original language: Mandarin
- No. of episodes: 20

Production
- Running time: 45 minutes (approx.)

Original release
- Network: Mediacorp Channel 8
- Release: 12 September – 7 October 2005

Related
- Beyond the Axis of Truth 法医X档案 (2001)

Beyond the aXis of Truth 2 (Chinese: 法医X档案 2) is a Singaporean Chinese drama which was telecasted on Singapore's free-to-air channel, MediaCorp Channel 8. This drama serial consists of 20 episodes and picks up from where the first series left off. It stars Edmund Chen, Ivy Lee, Ye Shipin, Nick Shen & Stella Ng as the casts of the second installment.

Edmund Chen and Ivy Lee reprise their roles respectively as a forensic pathologist who believes in supernatural science and a police superintendent who questions the existence of unexplainable forces. Together they tackle six supernatural cases involving time travel, cloning, a man with half a brain, women with electrokinesis, latent genes and plant-human hybrids.

== Synopsis ==
Case 1: A young artist travels back in time, bringing a modern phone with him. Falling in love with a woman, this relationship along with a series of misunderstandings bring about a murderous scheme concocted by his student. Back in the modern day, Wu Pinyu is contacted by her long deceased mother through the same phone belonging to the artist, causing her and Xueming to discover that they were communicating through time itself...

Case 2: A Frankenstein-based story with a twist - Professor Roland appear to be a respected doctor on the surface; in reality, he and his assistant Ye Zhongxing have been using illegal cloning to harvest organs for patients in desperate need of transplants. Zhongxing is morally conflicted about his actions and eventually decides to flee with Roland's personal clone, one created to replace his own wife. This, coupled with the police's discovery of several dead clones in an abandoned truck, kicks off a series of volatile events as Roland tries to get his personal clone back...

Case 3: When he was young, Zhuge Fei accidentally injures his childhood friend Kong Zhichong at a playground. The injury was so severe that Zhichong was left paralyzed with half a brain left, leaving Fei extremely guilt-ridden ever since. In the present day, a mysterious and gruesome suicide at a restaurant leads to the team learning that Zhichong's injury has somehow caused him to gain powerful but uncontrollable psychic abilities. Due to how dangerous his powers are and to keep him safe, his father has been hiding him in his house, but his brother keeps sneaking him out to give him a normal life, inadvertently causing more deaths and accidents...

Case 4: Fighting over a mysterious inheritance becomes deadly. Seven red-haired women, poised to inherit a strange fortune, are murdered one after another, with only three left, with two already known to the police and the last one's whereabouts currently unknown. It is later discovered that electricity literally runs within the hairs as people start turning up electrocuted to death. An unscrupulous journalist, determined to discover the truth by any means necessary, ends up dead as well, but the police quickly discovers that someone else is also involved in the murders, as he had been bludgeoned to death instead of being electrocuted.

The last surviving heir is later revealed to be one of the team's investigators, Zhou Xingxing, who ultimately inherits the fortune due to the deaths of the other two.

Case 5: A wedding turns into tragedy when the groom suddenly rejects his bride upon laying eyes on Pinyu, causing her to end up in a coma when she attempts suicide out of grief. The wedding guests are then treated to another shock when the young daughter of two guests suddenly bites her pet dog to death and starts eating it raw. All the cases link back to a psychiatrist Li Zhijian who believes he can bring out a person's latent genes of their past life. Even more disturbingly, children are going missing and suspicion falls upon one of Zhijian's patients. Just when the investigation becomes complicated, Xueming is shot right in front of Pinyu...

Case 6: What seemed to be ecoterrorism takes a turn for the strange when several deaths involving plants attacking humans are reported, causing Xueming to remember his lost love Li Yiwen. He and Pinyu are stunned when they come across Chen Meishan, an ecology conservation activist who looks exactly like Yiwen, but she is wary of the two while a mysterious figure lurks in the shadows, using his ability to manipulate plants to commit more murders. This is a continuation of the last arc of the first season.

== Cast ==
- Edmund Chen as Chen Xueming
- Ivy Lee as Wu Pinyu
- Nick Shen as Zhuge Fei
- Stella Ng as Zhou Xingxing / Xing Shufen
- Chen Shucheng as Wu Mingwei
- Ye Shipin as Song Guo'en

=== Other cast ===
- Guo Liang as Li Weizhong
- Jacelyn Tay as Wu Sang
- Wang Yuqing as Prof Lawrence
- Qi Yuwu as Ye Zhongxin
- Rui En as Fang Xiuxiu
- Julian Hee as Kong Zhichong
- Zhu Houren as Kong Xiaotian
- Roy Chiu as Kong Zhijie
- Joey Swee as Ning Xiaorou "Ah Moon"
- Jaime Teo as Red
- Lin Meijiao as Susan Tang
- Rayson Tan as Li Zhijian
- Huang Yiliang as Wu Chenyu
- Zheng Geping as Kent
- Priscelia Chan as Chen Meishan / Amura / Ke'er
- Zen Chong as Woody / Eldoras

== Accolades ==
Organisation	Year	Category	Nominee(s)	Result	Ref.
Star Awards	2005	Best Director 最佳导演	Chong Liung Man 张龙敏	Won	
Star Awards	2005	Best Screenplay 最佳剧本	Liew Kwee Lan and Tang Yeow	Won	
Star Awards	2005	Best Drama Serial	—N/a	Nominated	

== See also ==
- List of programmes broadcast by Mediacorp Channel 8
