= Star Awards 2001 =

Singaporean television awards

Star Awards 2001 红星大奖2001
- Date: 25 November 2001
- Location: MediaCorp TV Theatre, Caldecott Hills
- Country: Singapore
- Hosted by: Timothy Cao; Cheng Di

Highlights
- Best Drama Serial: Three Women and A Half 三个半女人
- Best Variety Show: Who Wants to Be a Millionaire? 百万大赢家
- Best Actor: Chen Hanwei 陈汉玮
- Best Actress: Aileen Tan 陈丽贞
- Special Achievement Award: Lee Weisong 李伟菘; Lee Shihsong 李偲菘

Television/radio coverage
- Network: Mediacorp Channel 8

Star Awards 2001 is a television awards ceremony telecast on 25 November 2001 as part of the annual Star Awards organised by MediaCorp to honour its artistes who work on MediaCorp TV Channel 8. It is the first awards ceremony presented by the newly rebranded MediaCorp (formerly the TCS). The ceremony was hosted by Timothy Chao and Chinese actress Cheng Di.

== Winners and nominees ==
Winners are listed first, highlighted in boldface.

**Best Director 最佳导演**: **Edmund Tse 谢益文 - Heroes in Black 我来也**; Chia Meng Yang 谢敏洋 - In Pursuit of Peace; Leong Lye Lin 梁来玲 - Beyond the Axis of Truth; Paul Yuen 袁树伟 - Looking for Stars; Tay Peck Choo 郑碧珠 - In Pursuit of Peace	**Best Screenplay 最佳剧本**: **Ho Hee Ann 何启安 - Beyond the Axis of Truth**; Ivy Low 陆慧凝 - Heroes in Black 我来也; Rebecca Leow 廖素馨 - Looking for Stars; Freddy Leow 廖明利 and 苏殷 - Three Women and A Half; Ang Eng Tee 洪荣狄 - You Light Up My Life 如何对你说
**Best Variety Producer 最佳综艺编导**: **Johnni Law - Star Search 2001 (Grand Finals) 才华横溢出新秀总决赛2001**; Elaine See - NKF Charity Show 2001 (Show 2); Hish Yin Jie - Top Fun; Jean Toh - NKF Charity Show 2001 (Show 1); Kerlin Teo - City Spy	**Best Variety Set Design 综艺创意设计**: **Rita Lee 李清玲 - City Spy 城市特务**; Evelyn Gow - Travel Hunt; Sharon Sin - Lunar New Year Eve Special 2001; Spruce Leung - Tonight With Chor Meng; Tay Lay Tin - Battle of The Best
**Best News Story 最佳新闻报道**: **Pitiful Mum 可怜妈妈**; Consolidation of Local Banking Sector 本地银行业大整合; Controlling the Crow's Population 乌鸦为患; Discoloured Path (Part 2) 变色归途; Li Teng Hui's Visit to Japan 李登辉赴日求医; Live Coverage on Wake of SQ Crash Victims SQ006空难——桃园殡仪馆法会报道; Pipe Burst 水管爆裂; Singapore Strudel Shootout 苹果酥饼专卖店; Successful Separation of Siamese Twins 连体婴成功分体; Thai Monk 泰国高僧

**Best Drama Serial 最佳电视剧**: **Three Women and A Half**; In Pursuit of Peace; Looking for Stars; Beyond the Axis of Truth; Heroes in Black 我来也	**Best Variety Programme 最佳综艺节目**: **Who Wants to Be a Millionaire?**; Celebrity Squares; City Beat 城人杂志; Food, Glorious Food 大小通吃; Top Fun 欢乐巅峰
**Best Variety Special 最佳综艺特备节目**: **NKF Charity Show 2001 (Show 2) 群星照亮千万心之天地绮梦献爱心 2001**; Star Search 2001 (Malaysia Finals) 大马才华横溢出新秀 2001); Star Search 2001 (Grand Finals) 才华横溢出新秀总决赛 2001; Lunar New Year Eve Special 2001 金蛇运转贺新年 2001; NKF Charity Show 2001 (Show 1) 群星照亮千万心之劲爆群星显温情 2001	**Best Theme Song 最佳主题曲**: **The Challenge 谁与争锋 - 光芒 (Cavin Soh)**; Fann Wong - Heroes in Black 我来也 - 《我来也匆匆去也匆匆》; Dreamz FM 梦飞船 - Master Swordsman Lu Xiaofeng 2 陆小凤2之凤舞九天 - 《天外有情》; Dreamz FM 梦飞船 - Through Thick And Thin 阿灿正传 - 《天天好心情》; Wang Min Hui 王敏惠 - Three Women and A Half - 《昨日的眼泪》
**Best Actor 最佳男主角**: **Chen Hanwei 陈汉玮 - Love Me, Love Me Not 真爱无敌**; Christopher Lee 李铭顺 - Looking for Stars 星锁; Edmund Chen - Beyond the Axis of Truth; Huang Wenyong 黄文永 - Three Women and A Half 三个半女人; Li Nanxing 李南星 - Dare To Strike 扫冰者	**Best Actress 最佳女主角**: **Aileen Tan - Three Women and A Half**; Chen Liping - Beyond the Axis of Truth; Fann Wong - Heroes In Black 我来也; Huang Biren - Three Women and A Half; Zoe Tay - The Stratagem 世纪攻略
**Star Awards for Best Supporting Actor**: **Yao Wenlong - Looking for Stars**; Chen Shucheng - Beyond the Axis of Truth; Nick Shen - Three Women and A Half; Rayson Tan - Three Women and A Half; Vincent Ng - Heroes in Black 我来也	**Best Supporting Actress 最佳女配角**: **Xiang Yun - The Challenge 谁与争锋**; Chen Huihui - Love Me, Love Me Not 真爱无敌; Florence Tan - The Invincible Squad 迷幻特警; Lin Meijiao - Three Women and A Half 三个半女人; Yvonne Lim - Master Swordsman Lu Xiaofeng 2 陆小凤2之凤舞九天
**Best Variety Show Host 最佳综艺主持人**: **Sharon Au - City Beat 城人杂志**; Chen Shucheng - Weekend Delight 赢万金游万里欢乐周末夜; Dasmond Koh - I Entertainment I娱乐; Jack Neo 梁智强 - Top Fun 欢乐巅峰; Mark Lee 李国煌 - Top Fun 欢乐巅峰	**Best Comedy Performer 最佳喜剧演员**: **Sharon Au 欧菁仙 - Right Frequency (Season 3) 播音人3**; Fiona Xie 谢宛谕 - My Genie 我爱精灵; Huang Wenyong 黄文永 - Don't Worry Be Happy (Season 5) 敢敢做个开心人5; Huang Yiliang 黄奕良 - My Genie 我爱精灵; Yao Wenlong 姚文隆 - My Genie 我爱精灵
**Best News/Current Affairs Presenter 最佳新闻播报/时事节目主持人**: **Ng Siew Leng 黄秀玲**; Chua Ying 蔡萦; Chun Guek Lay 曾月丽; Zhang Haijie 张海洁; Tung Soo Hua 董素华	**Most Popular Newcomer 最受欢迎新人奖**: **Fiona Xie 谢宛谕**; Bukoh Mary 巫许玛莉; Gan Woan Wen 颜婉雯; Michelle Liow 廖莹莹; Pierre Png 方展发; John Wong 王德远

=== Special awards ===
**Special Achievement Award** **特别成就奖**	**Lee Wei Song 李伟菘**; **Lee Shih Shiong 李偲菘**

=== Top 10 Most Popular Artiste ===
Winners and nominees:

Top 10 Most Popular Male Artistes	Top 10 Most Popular Female Artistes
**Chen Hanwei**; **Chew Chor Meng**; **Li Nanxing**; **Mark Lee**; **Jack Neo**; **Tay Ping Hui**; **Terence Cao**; **Vincent Ng**; **Xie Shaoguang**; **Edmund Chen**; Chen Shucheng; Chen Tianwen; Christopher Lee; Henry Thia; Huang Wenyong; Huang Yiliang; Mak Ho Wai; Moses Lim; Nick Shen; Rayson Tan	**Sharon Au**; **Fann Wong**; **Huang Biren**; **Ivy Lee**; **Jacelyn Tay**; **Phyllis Quek**; **Xiang Yun**; **Zoe Tay**; **Fiona Xie**; **Vivian Lai**; Aileen Tan; Cynthia Koh; Li-Lin; May Phua; Pan Lingling; Patricia Mok; Chen Liping; Tracer Wong; Wendy Tseng; Yvonne Lim

==== Malaysia polling ====
Winners and nominees:

Malaysia's Favourite Drama Serial 马来西亚最受欢迎电视剧	Malaysia's Favourite Male Artiste 马来西亚最受欢迎男艺人	Malaysia's Favourite Female Artiste 马来西亚最受欢迎女艺人
**The Stratagem** 世纪攻略; Dare To Strike 扫冰者; Heroes In Black 我来也; Looking For Stars; Angel's Dream	**Christopher Lee**; Chew Chor Meng; Huang Wenyong; Jack Neo; Li Nanxing; Rayson Tan; Tay Ping Hui; Terence Cao; Vincent Ng; Xie Shaoguang	**Zoe Tay**: Fann Wong; Florence Tan; Huang Biren; Ivy Lee; Jacelyn Tay; May Phua 潘淑钦; Phyllis Quek; Sharon Au; Xiang Yun

== Ceremony ==
Professional and Technical Awards were presented before the main ceremony via a clip montage due to time constraints. The main awards were presented during the ceremony.

== Presenters ==
Name(s)	Role
Zoe Tay	Presenter of the award for Most Popular Newcomer
Athena Chu	Presenter of the award for Malaysia Most Popular Male and Female Artiste
Nick Cheung	Presenter of the award for Best Supporting Actor and Actress
Coco Lee	Presenter of the award for Best Theme Song
Jacky Wu	Presenter of the award for Best Variety Programme and Best Variety Special Programme
Johnnie To	Presenter of the awards for Best Drama Serial
Senior Minister of State, Information, Communication and Arts and Defence; David Lim 林德恩	Gave Out Special Achievement Award
Nick Cheung	Presenter of the award for Best Comedy Performer
Feng Zhonghan 冯仲汉	Presenter of the award for Best News/Current Affairs Presenter
Matilda Tao	Presenter of the award for Best Variety Show Hosts
Francis Ng	Presenter of the award for Best Actor and Best Actress
Coco Lee; Francis Ng	Presenter of the award for Top 10 Most Popular Male Artistes
Jacky Wu; Matilda Tao	Presenter of the award for Top 10 Most Popular Female Artistes
