= Star Awards 2004 =

Singaporean television awards

Star Awards 2004 红星大奖2004
- Date: 12 December 2004
- Location: MediaCorp TV Theatre
- Country: Singapore
- Hosted by: Timothy Chao; Matilda Tao

Highlights
- Best Drama: A Child's Hope 2
- Best Variety/Info-ed Show: Creatively Mine
- Best Actor: Xie Shaoguang
- Best Actress: Ivy Lee
- All-time Favourite Artiste: Chew Chor Meng; Li Nanxing; Zoe Tay

Television/radio coverage
- Network: MediaCorp Channel 8
- Runtime: 180 mins

Star Awards 2004 was a television award telecasted in 2004 as part of the annual Star Awards organised by MediaCorp for MediaCorp TV Channel 8. This award was the 11th installment since its first presentation in 1994, ten years ago. This award ceremony saw revamps to various category awards, such as the introduction to the All-Time Favourite Artiste (an award for artistes who held ten Top 10 Most Popular Artistes Awards, recipients will not be eligible for future Top 10 Most Popular Artistes Awards), popularity polls held in Taiwan and Malaysia were discontinued and the retirement of the Special Achievement Award.

The ceremony was held on 12 December 2004 at the MediaCorp TV Theater with Timothy Chao and Taiwanese hostess Matilda Tao hosting.

== Winners and nominees ==
Winners are listed first, highlighted in boldface.

**Best Theme Song 最佳主题曲**: **Power Station 动力火车 – I Love My Family 我爱我家 – 《爱在身旁》**; Fann Wong 范文芳 – Always on My Mind 无炎的爱 – 《明天还有更远的路》; Cavin Soh 蘇智誠 – Home in Toa Payoh 家在大巴窑 – 《自己的天空》; Jeff Wang 王建復 – Under The House 同一屋檐下 – 《回来》; Tanya Chua 蔡健雅 – Timeless Gift 遗情未了 – 《原来》	**Best Director 最佳导演**: **Chong Liung Man 张龙敏 – I Love My Family 我爱我家**
**Best Screenplay 最佳剧本**: **Ang Eng Tee 洪荣狄 – Double Happiness 喜臨門I**	**Best Set Design 最佳布景设计**: **Ng Lichen 黄立成 and Oh Hock Leong 胡福荣 – Home in Toa Payoh 家在大巴窑**
**Best Programme Opening Titles 最佳节目开场片头设计**: **Jon Li Zun 李尊 – Oh! Dad 偶像爸爸**	**Best Variety Producer 最佳综艺编导**: **Elaine See 施意玲 – NKF Charity Show 2004 (Show 2) 群星照亮千万心之万众一心映天地**
**Best Promotional Video 最佳宣传短片**: **Simon Tan 陈行敏 – New Primetime Slot 全新7點檔**	**Best Variety Research Writer 最佳综艺资料撰稿**: **Eng Boon Ping 翁文彬 – World Kitchen (season 2) 美味天王2**
**Best Image/Costume Design 最佳形象服装设计**: **Fook Xue Ching 傅雪清 – Ties That Bind 家财万贯**	**Top-rated Drama Serial 最高收视率电视剧**: **An Ode To Life 三十风雨路**
**Best News Story 最佳新闻报道**: **Tan Bee Leng 陈美玲 – Prime Minister Swearing-in Ceremony 总理宣誓就职典礼**
**Best Current Affairs Story 最佳时事报道**: **Focus 焦点 – Nicoll Highway Caves In 尼诰大道坍塌**

**Best Drama Serial 最佳电视剧**: **A Child's Hope II 孩有明天2**; Always on My Mind 无炎的爱; An Ode to Life 三十风雨路; Double Happiness 喜临门; Room in My Heart 真心蜜语	**Best Variety Show 最佳综艺节目**: **Creatively Mine 我是创新王**; Barter Trade 物物大交换; Maid to Order 明星好帮手; School Belle and the Beau 流星校园; True Colours 秀出真我
**Best Variety Special 最佳综艺特备节目**: **NKF Charity Show 2004 (Show 1) 群星照亮千万心之熠熠星辉耀狮城**; Cancer Charity Show 2004 癌过有晴天; Lunar New Year Eve Special 2004 天鸡报喜迎春; NKF Charity Show 2004 (Show 2) 群星照亮千万心之天地有爱无极限; Star Awards 2003 红星大奖2003	**Young Talent Award 青苹果奖**: **Li Xian Min 李咸愍 – Double Happiness 喜临门**; Jerald Tan 陈杰乐 – A Child's Hope II 孩有明天2; Kyle Chan Xing Yu 陈星余 – Timeless Gift 遗情未了; Glenn Wong Jun Long – To Mum With Love 非一般妈妈; Xiao Li Yuan – A Child's Hope II 孩有明天2
**Best Actor 最佳男主角**: **Xie Shaoguang 谢韶光 – Double Happiness 喜记门**; Christopher Lee 李铭顺 – Timeless Gift 遗情未了; Edmund Chen 陈之财 – Man At Forty 跑吧！男人！; Li Nanxing 李南星 – A Child's Hope II 孩有明天2; Qi Yuwu 戚玉武 – Room In My Heart 真心蜜语	**Best Actress 最佳女主角**: **Ivy Lee 李锦梅 – Double Happiness 喜记门**; Fann Wong 范文芳 – Always on My Mind 无炎的爱; Huang Biren 黄碧仁 – An Ode To Life 三十风雨路; Jeanette Aw 欧萱 – A Child's Hope II 孩有明天2; Xiang Yun 向云 – Double Happiness 喜临门
**Best Supporting Actor 最佳男配角**: **Seow Ee Meng 萧乙铭 - Man at Forty 跑吧！男人！**; Chen Shucheng 陈澍城 - Room in My Heart 真心蜜语; Jeff Wang 王建复 - Double Happiness 喜临门; Nick Shen 沈炜竣 - Always on My Mind 无炎的爱; Zhang Wen Xiang 张汶祥 - Timeless Gift 遗情未了	**Best Supporting Actress 最佳女配角**: **Li Yinzhu 李茵珠 - A Child's Hope II 孩有明天2**; Chen Liping 陈莉萍 - A Child's Hope II 孩有明天2; Hong Huifang 洪慧芳 - Double Happiness 喜临门; May Phua 潘淑钦 - An Ode to Life 三十风雨路; Vivian Lai 赖怡伶 - Double Happiness 喜临门
**Best Variety Show Host 最佳综艺主持人**: **Mark Lee 李国煌 - Be My Guest 客人来**; Jeff Wang 王建复 - All in NETS NETS有钱坤; Marcus Chin 陈建彬 - King of Variety 周五娱乐王; Michelle Chong 庄米雪 - All in NETS NETS有钱坤; Sharon Au 欧菁仙 - Spring & Slide 威力无比加油战	**Best Comedy Performer 最佳喜剧演员**: **Marcus Chin 陈建彬 - Comedy Night 搞笑行动**; Mark Lee 李国煌 - Comedy Night 搞笑行动; Moses Lim 林益民 - Comedy Night 搞笑行动; Patricia Mok 莫小玲 - Comedy Night 搞笑行动; Zhang Wen Xiang 张汶祥 - Family Combo 门当户对
**Best News/Current Affairs Presenter 最佳新闻播报／时事主持人**: **Tung Soo Hua 董素华**; Chua Ying 蔡萦; Chun Guek Lay 曾月丽; Lin Chi Yuan 林启元; Ng Siew Leng 黄秀玲	

=== Special awards ===
Replacing the Special Achievement Award is All-Time Favourite Artiste- this award is a special achievement award given out to artiste(s) who have achieved a maximum of 10 popularity awards over 10 years. These artistes who won the All-Time Favourite Artiste were no longer eligible from running for the Top 10 Most Favourite Artiste in future ceremonies onwards, and its system is implemented so as to let younger MediaCorp artistes have a chance to win the popularity awards as well. Note that all three artistes' Top 10 winning years the recipients were awarded together on the same year.

**All-Time Favourite Artiste** **超级红星**	**Chew Chor Meng 周初明**	1994｜1995｜1996｜1997｜1998｜1999｜2000｜2001｜2002｜2003
**All-Time Favourite Artiste** **超级红星**	**Li Nanxing 李南星**	1994｜1995｜1996｜1997｜1998｜1999｜2000｜2001｜2002｜2003
**All-Time Favourite Artiste** **超级红星**	**Zoe Tay 郑惠玉**	1994｜1995｜1996｜1997｜1998｜1999｜2000｜2001｜2002｜2003

**Talented Artiste Award** **多才多艺红星奖**	**Jack Neo 梁智强**

=== Popularity awards ===
==== Top 10 Most Popular Artiste ====
Winners and nominees:

Top 10 Most Popular Male Artistes	Top 10 Most Popular Female Artistes
**Vincent Ng**; **Christopher Lee**; **Edmund Chen**; **Xie Shaoguang** (Note: 10th Award); **Tay Ping Hui**; **Moses Lim**; **Mark Lee**; **Qi Yuwu**; **Terence Cao**; **Dasmond Koh**; Chen Hanwei; Dennis Chew; Chen Shucheng; Huang Wenyong; Henry Thia; Huang Yiliang; Gurmit Singh; Marcus Chin; Zhu Houren; Richard Low	**Phyllis Quek**; **Fann Wong**; **Jeanette Aw**; **Chen Liping**; **Vivian Lai**; **Sharon Au**; **Huang Biren**; **Jacelyn Tay**; **Xiang Yun**; **Joanne Peh**; Joey Swee; Patricia Mok; Priscelia Chan; Jin Yinji; Yvonne Lim; Pan Lingling; Ivy Lee; Cynthia Koh; Fiona Xie; Wong Li Lin

==== Most Popular Newcomer ====
Winners and nominees:

Most Popular Newcomer
- **Joanne Peh**
  - Felicia Chin
  - Ng Hui
  - Rui En
  - Qi Qi

== Ceremony ==
Professional and Technical Awards were presented before the main ceremony via a clip montage due to time constraints. The main awards were presented during the ceremony.

== Performers and presenters ==
The following individuals presented awards or performed musical numbers.

=== Backstage ===
Artistes / Special guests	Presented / Performed
CEO, MediaCorp; Ernest Wong 黄源荣	Gave out award for Best Promotional Video, Best Image/Costume Design, Best News Story, Best Current Affairs Story and Top-rated Drama Serial
5566 band members	Presented Best Theme Song, Best Programme Opening Titles and Best Set Design
Flora Chan 陈慧珊	Presented Best Director and Best Screenplay
Hsu Nai-lin 徐乃麟	Presented Best Variety Producer and Best Variety Research Writer

=== Main ceremony ===
Artistes / Special guests	Presented / Performed
CEO, MediaCorp; Ernest Wong 黄源荣	Presented Best Drama Serial, Best Variety Show and Best Variety Special
Megan Zheng 郑智允; Jack Neo 梁智强	Presented Young Talent Award
Tan Swie Hian 陈瑞献	Presented Best News/Current Affairs Presenter
Li Nanxing 李南星; Zoe Tay 郑惠玉	Presented Best Supporting Actor and Best Supporting Actress
Gurmit Singh 葛米星; Chew Chor Meng 周初明	Presented Best Comedy Performer
CEO, MediaCorp; Ernest Wong 黄源荣	Presented Talented Artiste Award
Hsu Nai-lin 徐乃麟; Matilda Tao 陶晶莹	Presented Best Variety Show Host
Wilber Pan 潘瑋柏; Fann Wong 范文芳	Presented Most Popular Newcomer
Minister for Information, Communications and the Arts; Lee Boon Yang 李文献	Presented All-Time Favourite Artiste
Flora Chan 陈慧珊; Vicky Zhao 赵薇	Presented Best Actor and Best Actress
Ryu Si-won 柳時元; Vivian Hsu 徐若瑄	Presented Top 10 Most Favourite Male Artiste
5566	Presented Top 10 Most Favourite Female Artiste

== Accolades ==
Year	Ceremony	Category	Result	Ref
2005	Star Awards 2005	Best Variety Special 最佳综艺特备节目	Nominated	
