= Pan Lingling =

Singaporean actress (born 1970)

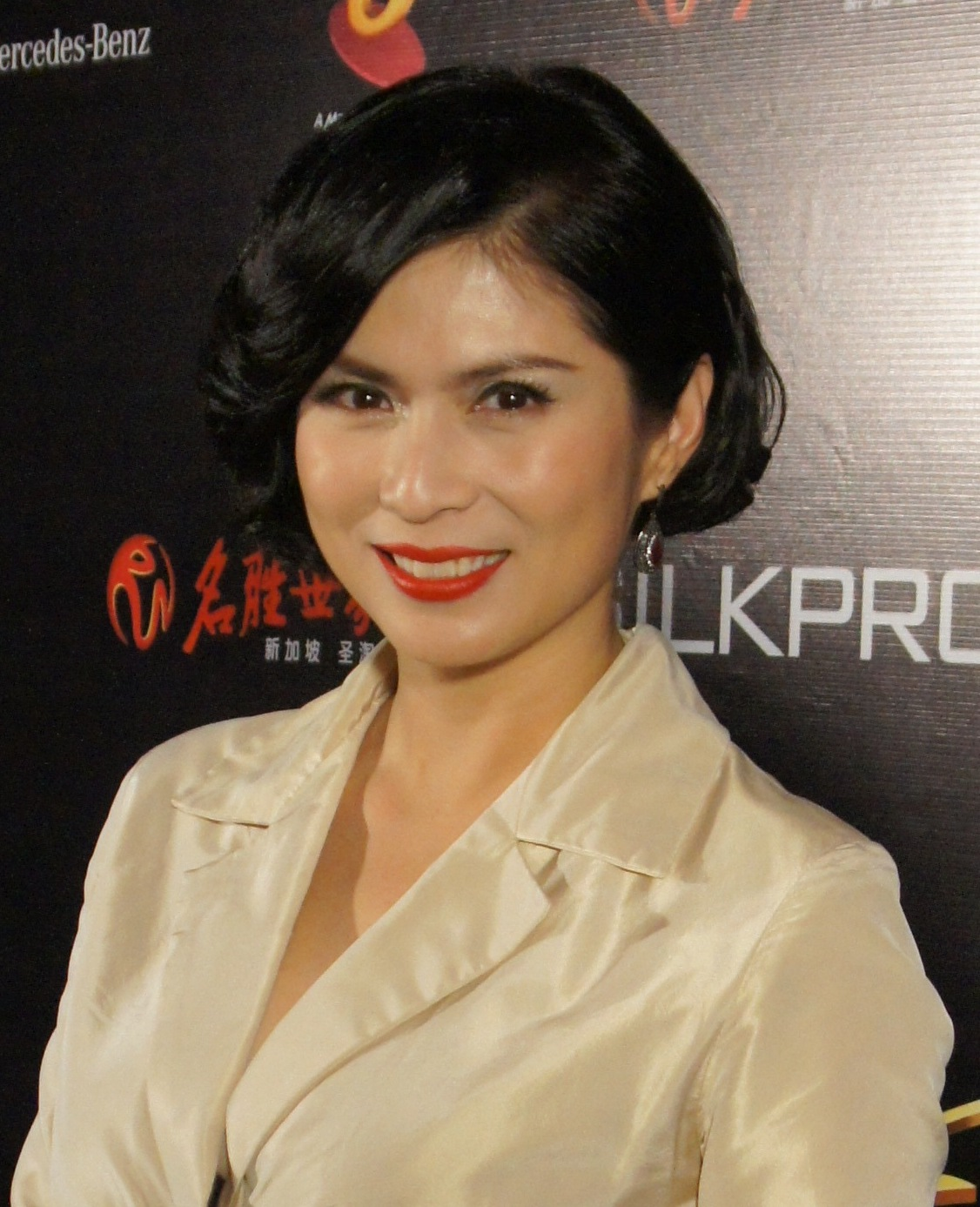
- Pan at the Star Awards 2011
- Born: Phua Leng Leng; 25 June 1970 (age 56); Singapore
- Occupations: Actress; host
- Years active: 1988–present
- Spouse: Huang Shi Nan (m. 1996)
- Children: 2
- Awards: Star Awards 1994, 1997, 1998, 2000, 2018 & 2019 : Top 10 Most Popular Female Artistes; Star Awards 2011: Best Supporting Actress

Chinese name
- Traditional Chinese: 潘玲玲
- Simplified Chinese: 潘玲玲
- Hanyu Pinyin: Pān Línglíng

Pan Lingling (born Phua Leng Leng on 25 June 1970) is a Singaporean actress and host.

== Career ==
Pan entered the entertainment industry in 1988 after graduating from the Singapore Broadcasting Corporation's 8th Drama Artiste Training Course. Her classmates in the training course include award-winning actress Huang Biren, Madeline Chu and Sean Say. She made her TV debut with the series, Mystery, Golden Quest, Ups and Downs. She also starred in Strange Encounters II in the same year.

Pan has acted in numerous television series produced by MediaCorp Channel 8 and its predecessors. She also played a supporting role as a psychologist in Jackie Chan's Crime Story. After some twenty years in the entertainment industry, she won her first accolade at the Star Awards 2011, the Best Supporting Actress award for her role in Breakout.

Pan has won six Star Awards for Top 10 Most Popular Female Artistes in 1994, 1997–1998, 2000, 2018–2019 respectively.

== Personal life ==
Pan married actor Huang Shinan in 1997. They have two sons, Beckham Wee (born 1999) and Kynaston Wee (born 2002).

Pan was diagnosed with Stage 1 breast cancer in March 2013. She kept her illness from the media initially, revealing only that a cyst was removed from her breast. She approached the magazine 8 Days in May that year for an interview on her illness, but withdrew. Pan had six cysts removed and underwent chemotherapy and radiotherapy as one of the lump was cancerous. While having her cancer treatment, Pan's father died of lung cancer in November.

== Filmography ==
=== Television series ===
Year	Title	Role	Notes	Ref.
1988	Mystery (迷离夜)			
1988	The Golden Quest (金麒麟)			
1988	Ups and Downs (婚姻保险)			
1988	Strange Encounters II (奇缘II)			
1989	Magic of Dance (鼓舞青春)			
1990	Wishing Well (幻海奇遇)			
1990	The Village Hero (大吉传奇)			
1990	Starting Over (暖流)			
1991	Fatal Endearment (喋海危情)			
1991	The Woman I Marry (家有恶妻)			
1991	Secret Operations (急转弯)			
1992	Woman of Substance (悲欢岁月)			
1993	Heavenly Beings (再战封神榜)			
1993	Mystery II (迷离夜II)			
1993	Battle of Justice (人海孤鸿)			
1993	Switch (妙鬼临门)			
1994	Web of Deceit (鹤啸九天)			
1994	Scorned Angel (冷太阳)			
1994	Silk & Romance (情丝万缕)			
1995	Thorny Love (浪子的童话)			
1995	War Roses (爱在漫天烽火时)			
1995	Project B (B 计划)			
1995	Heavenly Ghost Catcher (天师钟馗梆雪)			
1996	Ah Xue II (阿雪II)			
1996	Of Cops and Men (城市双雄)			
1996	Full House (不速之客)			
1997	The Silver Lining			
1997	Immortal Love (不老传说)			
1998	The Return of the Condor Heroes			
1998	Ups and Downs (金融风暴之陌生人)			
1999	Mr. OK (OK先生)			
2000	Angel's Dream (真相)			
2001	Beyond the Axis of Truth			
2001	Through Thick And Thin (阿灿正传)			
2001	The Hotel			
2001	Lucky Numbers (发财八百万)			
2002	The Crime Hunters			
2003	Love Is Beautiful (美丽家庭)			
2004	I Love My Home (我爱我家)			
2004	My Mighty-in-Laws			
2004	Oh Mother (哎哟我的妈!)			
2006	A Million Treasures	Zhizhi		
2006	C.I.D.	He Meiyun		
2007	Making Miracles	Cuiping		
2007	Like Father, Like Daughter	Babara		
2008	The Beautiful Scent	Winner		
2008	Beach.Ball.Babes	Wang Yi‘en		
2008	Crime Busters x 2	Wang Yumei		
2008	The Little Nyonya	Huang Xiufeng		
2009	Your Hand in Mine	Dolly Lin		
2010	Happy Family	Madam Noguchi		
2010	No Limits	Fu Liling		
2010	Breakout	Cai Siling		
2011	Secrets for Sale	Zhou Jiamei		
2011	On the Fringe 2011	Yao Huahua		
2011	A Song to Remember	Hua-gu		
2012	Joys of Life	Cai Shuxian		
2012	The Day It Rained on Our Parade	Lucy		
2012	Poetic Justice	Fiona		
2012	It Takes Two	Zhang Ling		
2013	96°C Cafe	Ma Xiuling		
2014	Mata Mata 2	Ah Ying		
2014	118	Liu Meimei		
2016	The Truth Seekers	June He Xiulian		
2016	The Dream Job	Lin Meilan		
2016	Eat Already?	Nurse		
2016	Hero	Xiao Jiahui		
2017	118 II	Liu Meimei		
2018	118 Reunion (118 大团圆)	Liu Meimei		
2018	Reach For The Skies	Zhong Ling		
2019	Hello Miss Driver (下一站，遇见)	Wang Wanyi		
2019	C.L.I.F. 5	Lin Meizhen		
2020	Happy Prince (快乐王子)	Li Anqi		
2020	Super Dad (男神不败)	Li Aisi		
2020	Mister Flower (花花公子)	Sun Meizhen		
2021	Key Witness (关键证人)	Hua Ge		
2021	The Heartland Hero	Liu Wangfen		
2021	The Peculiar Pawnbroker (人心鉴定师)	Ni Muluan		
2022	The Unbreakable Bond (寄生)	Lin Xiuhuan		
2022	When Duty Calls 2 (卫国先锋2)	Huang Yufen		
2022	Soul Doctor (灵医)	Xie Ruoya		
2023	Cash on Delivery	Luo Lifen		
2023	The Sky is Still Blue	Joanne		
2023	All That Glitters	Pan Xiaomei		
2024	Unforgivable	Wang Jinxiang		
2024	Never Too Late	Zhuo Yi Ting		

=== Film ===
Year	Title	Role	Notes	Ref.
1993	Crime Story	Psychiatrist		

=== Variety show hosting ===
Year	Title	Notes	Ref.
2020	Silver Carnival (银色嘉年华)		

== Discography ==
=== Compilation albums ===
Year	English title	Mandarin title
2015	MediaCorp Music Lunar New Year Album 15	新传媒群星金羊添吉祥
2018	MediaCorp Music Lunar New Year Album 18	新传媒群星阿狗狗过好年

== Awards and nominations ==
Organisation	Year	Category	Nominated work	Result	Ref.
Star Awards	1994	Top 5 Most Popular Female Artistes	—N/a	Won	
Star Awards	1995	Top 10 Most Popular Female Artistes	—N/a	Nominated	
Star Awards	1997	Top 10 Most Popular Female Artistes	—N/a	Won	
Star Awards	1998	Top 10 Most Popular Female Artistes	—N/a	Won	
Star Awards	2000	Top 10 Most Popular Female Artistes	—N/a	Won	
Star Awards	2001	Top 10 Most Popular Female Artistes	—N/a	Nominated	
Star Awards	2002	Top 10 Most Popular Female Artistes	—N/a	Nominated	
Star Awards	2003	Top 10 Most Popular Female Artistes	—N/a	Nominated	
Star Awards	2004	Top 10 Most Popular Female Artistes	—N/a	Nominated	
Star Awards	2005	Top 10 Most Popular Female Artistes	—N/a	Nominated	
Star Awards	2006	Top 10 Most Popular Female Artistes	—N/a	Nominated	
Star Awards	2007	Top 10 Most Popular Female Artistes	—N/a	Nominated	
Star Awards	2009	Top 10 Most Popular Female Artistes	—N/a	Nominated	
Star Awards	2010	Top 10 Most Popular Female Artistes	—N/a	Nominated	
Star Awards	2011	Top 10 Most Popular Female Artistes	—N/a	Nominated	
Star Awards	2011	Best Supporting Actress	Breakout (as Cai Sili)	Won	
Star Awards	2012	Top 10 Most Popular Female Artistes	—N/a	Nominated	
Star Awards	Star Awards	Top 10 Most Popular Female Artistes	—N/a	Nominated	
Star Awards	2014	Top 10 Most Popular Female Artistes	—N/a	Nominated	
Star Awards	2014	Star Awards for Most Popular Regional Artiste (Cambodia)	—N/a	Nominated	
Star Awards	2015	Star Awards for Most Popular Regional Artiste (Malaysia)	—N/a	Nominated	
Star Awards	2016	Top 10 Most Popular Female Artistes	—N/a	Nominated	
Star Awards	2017	Best Supporting Actress	Hero (as Xiao Jiahui)	Nominated	
Star Awards	2017	Top 10 Most Popular Female Artistes	—N/a	Nominated	
Star Awards	2018	Top 10 Most Popular Female Artistes	—N/a	Won	
Star Awards	2019	Top 10 Most Popular Female Artistes	—N/a	Won	
Star Awards	2021	Top 10 Most Popular Female Artistes	—N/a	Nominated	
Star Awards	2022	Top 10 Most Popular Female Artistes	—N/a	Nominated	
Star Awards	2023	Top 10 Most Popular Female Artistes	—N/a	Nominated	
Star Awards	2024	Top 10 Most Popular Female Artistes	—N/a	Nominated	
Star Awards	2024	My Pick! Favourite CP (Couple)	All That Glitters	Nominated (Note: Shared with Jeremy Chan)	
Star Awards	2025	Top 10 Most Popular Female Artistes	—N/a	Nominated	
Asian Television Awards	2011	Best Actress in a Supporting Role	Breakout (as Cai Sili)	Won	
Asian Television Awards	2012	Best Actress in a Supporting Role	A Song to Remember (as Hua-Gu)	Won	
