= Nick Shen =

Singaporean actor (born 1976)

- Born: 26 August 1976 (age 49); Singapore
- Education: Management Development Institute of Singapore
- Occupations: Actor; businessman; host; educator; radio presenter; singer
- Height: 1.75 m (5 ft 9 in)
- Parents: Sim Soo Guan (father); Tan Bock King (mother)
- Awards: Star Search 1999 : Singapore Male Champion; JCI Ten Outstanding Young Persons of the World 2014 : Cultural Achievement

Stage name
- Traditional Chinese: 沈煒竣
- Simplified Chinese: 沈炜竣
- Hanyu Pinyin: Shěn Wěijùn

Birth name
- Traditional Chinese: 沈偉峻
- Simplified Chinese: 沈伟峻
- Hanyu Pinyin: Shěn Wěijùn

Nick Shen (born 26 August 1976) is a Singaporean actor, businessman and host. He was a full-time Mediacorp artiste from 1999 to 2012. In 2011, Shen started the company Tok Tok Chiang Wayang to promote Chinese opera in Singapore.

== Early life ==
Shen pursued a Diploma in Mass Communication at the Management Development Institute of Singapore. He has a younger brother.

== Career ==
Shen joined MediaCorp after winning the local edition of Star Search Singapore in 1999. Besides acting he has written and performed his own songs, some of which were used for MediaCorp drama theme songs. He left MediaCorp in early 2012 and has since been working on the promotion of Chinese opera in Singapore. Shen is the global winner for Ten Outstanding Young Persons of the World and JCI Cultural Achievement Honour Award in 2014.

Shen has appeared as a guest radio DJ on MediaCorp Capital 95.8FM. He is also a faculty member of the Singapore Media Academy where he lectures in the Diploma in Acting course.

Since April 2013, Shen began performing the Chinese art of bian lian. He is the first actor in Singapore to master the art, where he was trained by Chinese bian lian master Li Shuimin for two years.

== Personal life ==
Shen shared on social media that he had a severe case of shingles which began developing symptoms in July 2023, which in turn led to a diagnosis of Bell's palsy. He was hospitalised for the illnesses for five days in September 2023.

== Filmography ==
=== Television series ===
Year	Title	Role	Notes	Ref.
1999	Mr OK (OK先生)	Xiaodong		
1999	My Grandpa (公公,你的名字好难叫)	Fang Zhenhua		
1999	S.N.A.G. (新好男人)			
2000	Right Frequency II			
2000	The Stratagem (世纪攻略)			
2001	Beyond the Axis of Truth	Zhuge Fei		
2001	Three Women and a Half	Jeffrey		
2001	Growing Up	Meng		
2001	The Reunion	San Wan		
2001	The Hotel	Huang Dajun		
2002	First Touch	Wee Teck Meng		
2002	Kopi-O II	Hong Jinbao		
2003	First Touch II	Wee Teck Meng		
2003	My Love, My Home (同一屋檐下)			
2003	Always on My Mind 无炎的爱			
2003	Lobang King			
2003	A Toast of Love	David Pan Weiwen		
2004	An Ode to Life	Zhang Ruiming		
2005	Beautiful Illusions			
2005	Beyond the aXis of Truth II	Zhuge Fei		
2005	A Promise for Tomorrow	Tang Weihong		
2006	CID	Fly		
2006	Family Matters	Shi Baobao		
2006	I Not Stupid Too	Hao Letian		
2007	Like Father, Like Daughter	Coconut / Ah Gui		
2007	Metamorphosis	Zhang Shaoqi		
2008	Taste of Love			
2008	Crime Busters x 2	Sun Jiaqing		
2009	Perfect Cut II			
2010	The Pupil	DPP Lawrence Khoo		
2010	The Illusionist (魔幻视界)	James's father (young)		
2010	New Beginnings	Zhen Xiong		
2010	The Family Court	Wu Baoming		
2011	In Time with You	Woody		
2017	Legal Eagles	Zhou Xiongwei		
2017	Eat Already? 3	Ken		
2018	118 Reunion (118大团圆)	George		
2018	Doppelganger – Prequel (入侵者- 前传)	Billy		
2018	Say Cheese	Pan Heping		
2019	Walk with Me (谢谢你出现在我的行程里)	Prof Dong		
2020	Titoudao: Inspired by the True Story of a Wayang Star	Gwee Boon		

=== Film ===
Year	Title	Role	Notes	Ref.
2008	The Casuarina Cove		Short film	
2009	Tanjong Rhu	Kelvin	Short film	
2012	Filial Haven	Rick	Short film	
2012	Ah Boys to Men			
2012	My Ghost Partner			
2013	Red Numbers			
2013	Time No Enough			
2016	Zi Char		Telemovie	
2016	Mother		Short film	

== Discography ==
=== Compilation albums ===
- Sing Singapore 2002 (2002)
- MediaCorp Music Lunar New Year Album (2003)
- MediaCorp Music Lunar New Year Album (2004)
- MediaCorp Music Christmas Album December Stars 2 (2007)

== Theatre ==
- The Glass Menagerie (2002)
- Revelation (2003)
- Opening The Doors Of Your Heart (2005)
- Snakes & Lovers (2006)
- Passage Of Time (2007)
- Own Time Own Target (2008)
- Beautiful Dreams (2009)
- Expectations! (2010)
- Don’t Forget To Say Good Bye (2011)
- Water Repentance (2013)

== Awards and nominations ==
Year	Ceremony	Category	Nominated work	Result
1999	Star Awards	Best Newcomer	My Grandpa	Won
2001	Star Awards	Best Supporting Actor	Three Women and A Half (as Jeffrey)	Nominated
2001	Star Awards	Top 10 Most Popular Male Artistes	—N/a	Nominated
2002	Star Awards	Best Supporting Actor	The Reunion (as San Wan)	Nominated
2004	Star Awards	Best Supporting Actor	Always on My Mind (as Tang Xinhai)	Nominated
2007	Star Awards	Best Supporting Actor	Like Father, Like Daughter (as Gui)	Nominated
