= Terence Cao =

Singaporean actor (born 1967)

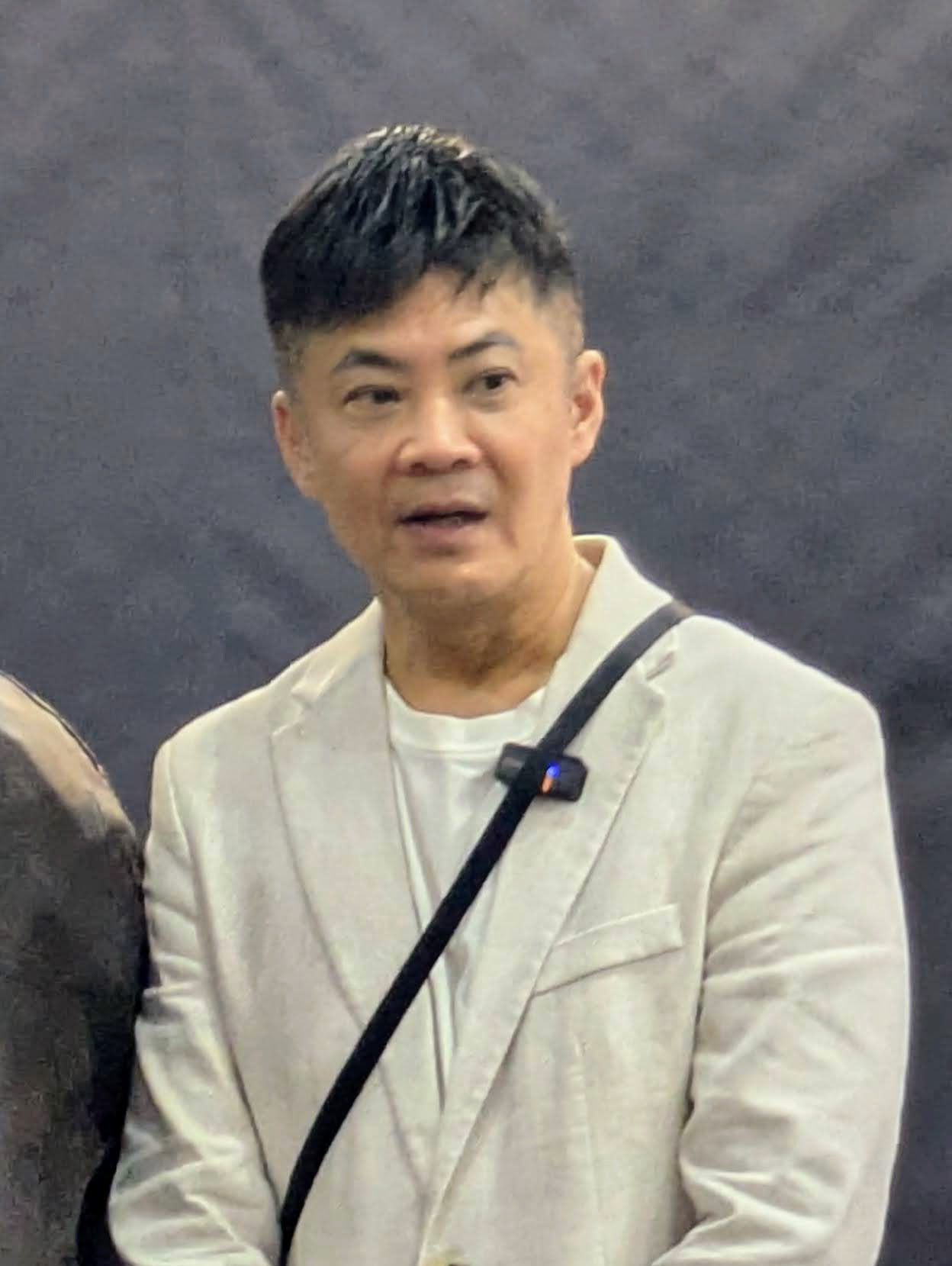
- Cao in 2024
- Born: Cao Guohui; 6 October 1967 (age 59); Singapore
- Education: Anglo-Chinese School
- Occupations: Actor; businessman
- Years active: 1989–present
- Agent: The Celebrity Agency
- Notable work: 1994: The Challenger; 1999: Stepping Out; 2001: The Reunion; 2010: The Best Things in Life
- Children: 1
- Awards: Star Awards 1998 – Star Awards 2005 : Top 10 Most Popular Male Artistes; Star Awards 2011 : Best Supporting Actor

Chinese name
- Traditional Chinese: 曹國輝
- Simplified Chinese: 曹国辉
- Hanyu Pinyin: Cáo Guóhuī

Terence Cao Guohui (born 6 October 1967) is a Singaporean actor and businessman.

== Life and career ==
Cao studied at Anglo-Chinese School for both his primary and secondary education. Cao used to be a flight attendant and joined Singapore Broadcasting Corporation (later MediaCorp) in 1989 after completing the 9th drama training course. Apart from acting in several Channel 8 television drama series, Cao has also performed the theme songs for some of the series he starred in and has also acted in some television films. In 2011, he clinched the Best Supporting Actor in the Star Awards 2011.

Cao has gotten 7 out of 10 Top 10 Most Popular Male Artistes from 1994, 1998–2001, 2004–2005 respectively.

== Personal life ==
=== Relationships ===
In November 2012, it was reported in the local media that Cao had an alleged affair with a Shanghainese lady in 2010. The woman went on to bear his child in China and flew to Singapore to look for him. After a DNA test, it was confirmed that Cao is the biological father of the then 20-month-old girl.

=== Legal issues ===
In 2005, Cao was charged with drink driving after failing a breathalyser test. He reportedly “created a scene at the hospital” and had refused to give a blood sample. He was later fined S$4,100, with his driver's license suspended for two years in 2008.

In March 2021, Cao was charged for breaking Singapore's COVID-19 restrictions. He was fined S$3,500.

== Filmography ==
=== Television series ===
Year	Title	Role	Notes	Ref.
1990	Sweet Dreams 欣欣向荣	Jin Zhongheng		
1990	Imperial Intrigue 大内双宝	Zhou Wenyan		
1991	Fatal Endearment 谍海危情	Xin Guang		
1991	The Other Woman 醋劲100	Liu Haofan		
1991	The Future is Mine 锦绣前程	Jin Zhengyang		
1992	A Time to Dance 火舞风云	Shen Huodong		
1992	Breaking Point 暴风边缘	Alan		
1992	My Buddies 浪漫战场	Zhang Weiliang		
1992	Between Friends 山水喜相逢	Lin Guoli		
1993	Ride the Waves 卿本佳人	Simon		
1993	The Young and the Restless 俏皮战士	Lin Guobiao		
1993	Switch 妙鬼临门	Wu Chunxi		
1993	Web of Deceit 鹤啸九天	Luo Yunfei		
1994	The Challenger 勇者无惧	Lin Yongjie		
1994	The Legendary White Snake 白蛇后传	Xu Shilin		
1995	Coffee or Tea 是非屋	Cai Huakang		
1995	War Roses 爱在漫天烽火时	Cai Zhijie		
1995	Deep in the Night 惊梦魂	Chen Dali		
1995	Lady Investigators 女探三人组 之《房客》&《遗恨》	Zhang Guohui		
1996	Triad Justice 飞越珍珠坊	Yang Shaolin		
1996	Tales of the Third Kind III 第三类剧场III 之《魔女复仇》	Kuang Shaoguang		
1996	The Prime Years 创意先锋	He Weisheng		
1997	Crimes and Tribulations 狮城奇案录 之《乌龙一枪》	Shanghai Zai		
1997	Longing 悲情年代	Peng Zhixian		
1997	Courage of Fire 炽火豪情	Chen Hanqiang		
1997	Sword and Honour 铁血男儿	Jin Ming		
1998	Stand by Me	Du Hansheng		
1998	Living in Geylang 芽笼芽笼	Yang Keming		
1999	Bright Future 同一片蓝天	Zhang Wenguang		
1999	God of Fortune 财神爷	Jinbao Tianzun		
1999	Stepping Out	Chen Xia		
1999	S.N.A.G. 新好男人	Jason		
2000	The Voices Within 心灵物语	Xu Daming		
2000	Four Walls and a Ceiling 我爱黄金屋	Shen Litai		
2000	Angel's Dream	Shen Jianbang		
2001	Through Thick and Thin 阿灿正传	Zhou Mingwei		
2001	The Challenge 谁与争锋	Xiao Tianxing		
2001	The Hotel	Johnny Ma		
2001	The Reunion	Chen Guanjun		
2002	Oh Carol!	Henry Toh		
2002	Blueprint – The Bra Shop	A-Guan		
2002	Innocently Guilty 法内有情天	Shuwen		
2003	Lobang King	William		
2003	Love is Beautiful 美丽家庭	Huang Letian		
2003	Sun, Moon, Star			
2003	Always on my Mind 无炎的爱			
2004	An Ode to Life	Ou Qiming		
2004	The Ties that Bind 家财万贯	Xu Chuanfeng		
2005	You Are the One	An Zhengxi		
2005	Portrait of Home	Lin Dahai		
2005	Portrait of Home II	Lin Dahai		
2006	Women of Times	Du Zhongxian		
2006	Love at 0 °C 爱情零度C	Hu Guojun		
2006	Family Matters	Zheng Weilun		
2007	Making Miracles	Wen Jieren		
2007	Switched!	Wang Anxiang		
2007	Metamorphosis	Di Lun		
2008	Love Blossoms	Yu Wenhao		
2008	Love Blossoms II	Yu Wenhao		
2008	By My Side	Zixin		
2008	By My Side	Zijian		
2009	My School Daze	Tan Xiangfeng		
2009	The Ultimatum	He Chaoqun		
2009	Baby Bonus	Xu Qingguang (Simon)		
2010	The Best Things in Life	Song Daming	Won – Star Awards 2011 Best Supporting Actor	
2010	The Score	Su Nancheng		
2011	Prosperity	Tao Jinhan		
2011	The In-Laws	Bai Zijun		
2011	Devotion	Xie Zhi'an		
2012	Double Bonus	Jin Junjie		
2013	Break Free	Jin Yongcheng		
2013	The Journey: A Voyage	Zhang Guangda		
2014	Soup of Life	Xu Haisheng (Ah Hai)		
2014	The Caregivers Missy 先生	Lin Jiaming		
2014	C.L.I.F. 3	Yang Zhongzheng		
2015	Good Luck	Lin Shijie		
2015	Mind Game	Li Zhenbang		
2016	Beyond Words	Liang Lekun		
2016	Peace & Prosperity	He Sheng		
2016	C.L.I.F. 4	Yang Zhongzheng		
2016	Hero	Xie Xian		
2017	The Lead	Guo Liwei		
2017	My Teacher Is a Thug	Fang Chen		
2017	While We Are Young	Bai Jinshun		
2018	Babies on Board	Edmund Goh		
2018	Jalan Jalan 带你去走走	Cui Yajiu		
2019	Old Is Gold 老友万岁	SD Kang		
2019	New Little Nyonya 新·小娘惹			
2022	128 Circle Season 2	Henry		
2023	Last Madame: Sisters of the Night	Lou Seh		
2024	Kill Sera Sera		Cameo	

=== Film ===
Year	Title	Role	Notes	Ref.
2024	Money No Enough 3			
2024	I Not Stupid 3	Mr. Lim, Class 6A's Science Teacher		

== Awards and nominations ==
Year	Ceremony	Category	Nominated work	Result	Ref
1994	Star Awards	Top 10 Most Popular Male Artistes	—N/a	Won	
1995	Star Awards	Best Actor	The Challenger (as Lin Yongjie)	Nominated	
1995	Star Awards	Top 10 Most Popular Male Artistes	—N/a	Nominated	
1996	Star Awards	Top 10 Most Popular Male Artistes	—N/a	Nominated	
1997	Star Awards	Top 10 Most Popular Male Artistes	—N/a	Won	
1998	Star Awards	Best Actor	Stand By Me(as Du Hansheng)	Nominated	
1998	Star Awards	Top 10 Most Popular Male Artistes	—N/a	Won	
1999	Star Awards	Best Actor	Stepping Out (as Chen Xia)	Nominated	
1999	Star Awards	Top 10 Most Popular Male Artistes	—N/a	Won	
2000	Star Awards	Best Actor	Four Walls and a Ceiling (as Shen Litai)	Nominated	
2000	Star Awards	Top 10 Most Popular Male Artistes	—N/a	Won	
2001	Star Awards	Top 10 Most Popular Male Artistes	—N/a	Won	
2002	Star Awards	Best Actor	The Reunion (as Chen Guanjun)	Nominated	
2002	Star Awards	Top 10 Most Popular Male Artistes	—N/a	Nominated	
2003	Star Awards	Top 10 Most Popular Male Artistes	—N/a	Nominated	
2004	Star Awards	Top 10 Most Popular Male Artistes	—N/a	Won	
2005	Star Awards	Top 10 Most Popular Male Artistes	—N/a	Won	
2006	Star Awards	Top 10 Most Popular Male Artistes	—N/a	Nominated	
2007	Star Awards	Top 10 Most Popular Male Artistes	—N/a	Nominated	
2010	Star Awards	Top 10 Most Popular Male Artistes	—N/a	Nominated	
2011	Star Awards	Best Supporting Actor	The Best Things in Life (as Song Daming)	Won	
2011	Star Awards	Top 10 Most Popular Male Artistes	—N/a	Nominated	
2012	Star Awards	Top 10 Most Popular Male Artistes	—N/a	Nominated	
2013	Star Awards	Top 10 Most Popular Male Artistes	—N/a	Nominated	
2014	Star Awards	Best Actor	The Journey: A Voyage(as Zhuang Guangda)	Nominated	
2014	Star Awards	Most Popular Regional Artiste (Cambodia)	—N/a	Nominated	
2015	Star Awards	Top 10 Most Popular Male Artistes	—N/a	Nominated	
2017	Star Awards	Top 10 Most Popular Male Artistes	—N/a	Nominated	
2019	Star Awards	Top 10 Most Popular Male Artistes	—N/a	Nominated	
