= Ivy Lee (actress) =

Singaporean actress (born 1973)

- Born: 16 July 1973 (age 53); Singapore
- Other name: Li Jinmei
- Education: Singapore Polytechnic
- Occupations: Actress; host
- Years active: 1993—2009 (acting and hosting)
- Spouse: Raymond Choy (m. 1997)
- Children: 4
- Awards: Full list

Chinese name
- Traditional Chinese: 李錦梅
- Simplified Chinese: 李锦梅
- Hanyu Pinyin: Lǐ Jǐnméi

Ivy Lee (born 16 July 1973) is a Singaporean former actress and host, who was a full-time Mediacorp artiste from 1993 to 2007. She has won three Star Awards for Best Actress for her performances in the television series Angel's Dream (2000), Double Happiness (2004) and Family Matters (2006).

== Early life and career ==
Lee graduated from Singapore Polytechnic with a Diploma in Biomedical in 1993. The same year, she joined TCS (predecessor of MediaCorp) after winning the biannual Star Search and clinching the "Miss Photogenic" title at the same contest.

At the Star Awards 2006, Lee was awarded the Best Actress award for her role as a lawyer in the drama serial Family Matters. Before that, she was also named the Best Actress another two times; the first in 2000, and then in 2004.

Later in her career, Lee was known for her on-screen partnership with actor Edmund Chen, most notably in The Wing of Desire, Beyond the Axis of Truth, Double Happiness, House of Joy and Live Again. At the Star Awards 2007 anniversary special celebrating 25 years of Chinese drama in Singapore, they were named one of the Top 5 Favourite On-screen Partners for their roles as husband and wife in Double Happiness.

Lee moved to Hong Kong with her family two years later. She has been based in London, England, since 2017.

== Personal life ==
Lee is currently based in England with her four children and her Hong Kong-born television producer and director husband Raymond Choy, whom she married in 1997 and in the same year, gave birth to a girl. In 2005, Lee gave birth to twin boys. In 2009, she gave birth to another girl. In an interview, Lee stated that she relocated to Hong Kong with her children so as to be nearer to her husband who travels frequently within the Greater China Region.

== Filmography ==
=== Television series ===
Year	Title	Role	Notes	Ref
1993	That Moment in Time (红尘独舞)	Jiang Xinyi		
1994	Those Were The Days (生命擂台)	Luo Xueting		
1994	Fiery Lover (烈火情人)	Ruan Jiaqi		
1994	Strike Back (越界威龙)	Wang Weier	Telemovie	
1994	The Magnate (叱咤风云)	Zhang Yijun /Ruan Min		
1995	Sea Eagle (海岸猎鹰)	Wen Meibao	Telemovie	
1995	Dream Hunters (追心一族)			
1995	The Last Rhythm (曲终魂断)	He Biru		
1995	The Dragons Five (飞龙五将)	Liu Meiying		
1996	Ah Xue (阿雪)	Ah Xue/ Zhang Jingwen		
1996	Kungfu Master 1996 (掌门人1996)	Huang Zuer		
1996	Ordinary Ambitions (阳光伴我行)			
1997	The Royal Monk (真命小和尚)	Princess Yingying		
1997	Crimes & Tribulations (狮城奇案录 之《绑票大亨》)	Honghong		
1997	The Price of Peace	Natsuki Hideko / Xiuxiu		
1998	Act 235 (刑事235)	Fan Jiaxuan		
1998	Season of Love	Lin Xiaoshuang		
1999	Stepping Out	Ah Ju		
2000	The Legendary Swordsman	Yue Lingshan		
2000	Angel's Dream	Chen Anqi		
2000	Four Walls And A Ceiling (我爱黄金屋)	Fu Meiyan		
2001	No Problem (考试家族)	Sun Fengxi		
2001	Beyond the Axis of Truth	Wu Pinyu		
2001	The Hotel	Miss Seto		
2002	Brotherhood	Zhang Li		
2002	The Wing Of Desire (天使的诱惑)	Lin Jiaxuan		
2003	A Child's Hope	Yan Lizhu		
2003	Always on My Mind (无炎的爱)	Yang Meina		
2004	Double Happiness I & II	Situ Yaxi		
2004	Beautiful Trio	Leo Leo		
2005	Beyond The aXis of Truth II	Wu Pinyu / Zhang Liangxing		
2006	C.I.D.	Ye Xue		
2006	Family Matters	Zhao Shuyang		
2006	House of Joy	Zheng Yihuan		
2007	Live Again	Han Qizhen		
2008	Love Blossoms	Tao Zijing		
2008	Love Blossoms II	Tao Zijing		

=== Variety show host ===
Year	English title	Mandarin title
2002	Foodies Choice	美食包打听
2003	Be My Guest	客人来
2007	My Star Guide II	我的导游是明星 II

== Discography ==
=== Compilation albums ===
Year	English title	Mandarin title
2003	MediaCorp Music Lunar New Year Album 03	新传媒群星贺岁庆丰年
2005	MediaCorp Music Lunar New Year Album 05	新传媒迎春接福喜临门
2009	MediaCorp Music Lunar New Year Album 09	新传媒福牛迎端年

== Awards and nominations ==
Year	Ceremony	Category	Nominated work	Result	Ref
1994	Star Awards	Best Newcomer	—N/a	Won	
1995	Star Awards	Top 5 Most Popular Female Artistes	—N/a	Won	
1996	Star Awards	Top 5 Most Popular Female Artistes	—N/a	Nominated	
1999	Star Awards	Best Actress	Stepping Out (as Ju)	Nominated	
1999	Star Awards	Top 10 Most Popular Female Artistes	—N/a	Won	
2000	Star Awards	Best Actress	Angel's Dream (as Chen Anqi)	Won	
2000	Star Awards	Top 10 Most Popular Female Artistes	—N/a	Won	
2001	Star Awards	Top 10 Most Popular Female Artistes	—N/a	Won	
2002	Star Awards	Best Actress	The Wing Of Desire (as Lin Jiaxuan)	Nominated	
2002	Star Awards	Top 10 Most Popular Female Artistes	—N/a	Won	
2003	Star Awards	Top 10 Most Popular Female Artistes	—N/a	Nominated	
2004	Star Awards	Best Actress	Double Happiness (as Situ Yaxi)	Won	
2004	Star Awards	Top 10 Most Popular Female Artistes	—N/a	Nominated	
2005	Star Awards	Top 10 Most Popular Female Artistes	—N/a	Nominated	
2006	Star Awards	Best Actress	Family Matters (as Zhao Shuyang)	Won	
2006	Star Awards	Top 10 Most Popular Female Artistes	—N/a	Nominated	
2007	Star Awards	Best Actress	House of Joy (as Zheng Yihuan)	Nominated	
2007	Star Awards	Top 10 Most Popular Female Artistes	—N/a	Won	
2009	Star Awards	Top 10 Most Popular Female Artistes	—N/a	Won	
