= Live Again (TV series) =

- 天堂鸟
- Genre: Family drama
- Written by: Su Yin 苏殷
- Starring: Ivy Lee; Phyllis Quek; Shaun Chen; Vivian Lai; Chen Shucheng
- Country of origin: Singapore
- Original language: Mandarin
- No. of episodes: 20

Production
- Producer: He Fa Ming 何发明
- Running time: approx. 45 minutes

Original release
- Network: MediaCorp TV Channel 8
- Release: 13 November – 10 December 2007

Live Again (Chinese: 天堂鸟) is a 2007 Singaporean Mandarin drama series which was telecast on Singapore's free-to-air channel, MediaCorp TV Channel 8. The serial debuted on 13 November 2007. It consists of 20 episodes, and was originally screened on every weekday night at 9 pm. It stars Ivy Lee, Phyllis Quek, Shaun Chen, Vivian Lai & Chen Shucheng as the casts of this series.

The serial portrays the psychological and physical trauma experienced by victims of domestic violence.

It was broadcast again on 5 July 2008 from 4.30 pm to 6.30 pm every weekend (Saturday and Sunday).

== Plot ==
In the context of the show, while in a drunken state, Du Xiangyi beats up his wife, Han Qizhen. He becomes more and more violent with every incident. Han is heart-broken; worn out emotionally and physically, and unable to bear with it any longer. She decides to take her daughter, Tongtong, away to Canada to look for her parents. Just before they manage to leave, Xiangyi discovers her plan. Furious, he starts hitting her and his brutal blows frighten Tongtong. Anxious to protect her daughter, Han picks up a heavy object and hits Xiangyi at the back of his head. Thinking that she has killed him by accident, Han panics and runs off to her good friend, Coco's home. They decide to go back to the Du family home before thinking about what to do. However, they find that Xiangyi's body has gone missing!

Qizhen breathes easier now that she's certain Xiangyi isn't dead. To avoid harassment from Xiangyi, Han moves to Coco's place for the time being. However, her husband fails to re-appear after two weeks; neither has he rung anyone or turned up at his office. Qizhen begins to fret. Then, she receives a mysterious phone call, forcing her to agree to an appointment. It turns out that Da Tou Cai, their incorrigible gambler of a neighbour, has witnessed Han ‘murdering’ Xiangyi and is now trying to blackmail her.

Revealed in flashbacks, Xiangyi had come to Singapore from Malaysia to forge a career in music. He used to be a songwriter who had attained some recognition for his work but unfortunately, things did not go according to his wishes. The record company he had hoped to work with had to close down because of financial problems. During this period, he met Han, the woman who would change his destiny. In Han's eyes, Xiangyi was a cheerful and ambitious man who knew how to enjoy life as well. They fell in love and started a family together.

When their daughter Tongtong was born, Han quit her job to be a housewife. Their love and unity to face all odds was slowly corroded by the hardship of daily toil. Xiangyi had to work two jobs to support his family. As time passed, his inspiration and time for creating music began to get overshadowed by the hardship of life and tedious work. After several years, he turned to alcohol as his depression and frustration mounted. From drowning his sorrows, he went on to become violent when he got inebriated. He blamed his problems on his wife and daughter. Qizhen naturally became the target of his physical abuse when he felt the need to vent his frustrations. But...did Qizhen really kill Xiangyi that night?

It turns out that Xiangyi has woken up after being knocked out. He stumbles out of his home and rolls down a slope. When he wakes up, his mind is a blank and he sees an old man Uncle Zhang (Chen Shucheng) picking junk. Upon seeing Xiangyi's starving eyes watching him, Uncle Zhang gives him the box of lunch in his hands. He questions his identity. Xiangyi can only shake his head in confusion, mumbling, “I’ve forgotten... who am I?”

Even though Uncle Zhang's mind is full of questions, he nevertheless takes Xiangyi in. Xiangyi helps Uncle Zhang out at his used goods stall at the Sungei Road flea market, thus embarking on his new life. During his stay with Uncle Zhang, he observes the strange relationship between Uncle Zhang and his three wealthy sons. He also gets to know a young lady who comes to visit Uncle Zhang – Xie Sir. Xiangyi has changed into a totally different person. His past violence, depression and bad habits have become history, buried just like his memories. The person he is today is his previous self - sincere and diligent. He becomes friends with Siru and after getting to know each other, they both have good impressions of each other.

Qizhen has been good friends with Coco since they were in secondary school. She is also very familiar with Coco's brother Haiming. The latter is an honest and down-to-earth draftsman. He is shy and does not express himself very well and hence has no girlfriend to this date. He has feelings for Qizhen since a long time ago, but has never dared to express himself. During recent times, he has seen Qizhen tormented by worry, fear and guilt. He watches her as she stops smiling and becomes depressed. Feelings of love and an urge to protect her wells up within him, and he does all he can to take care of her. Da Tou Cai's blackmail is found out by Haiming and Qizhen has no choice but to come clean with the truth. Haiming helps Qizhen stop the harassment and they develop deeper feelings for each other.

Xiangyi slowly recovers from his brain injury. He sometimes sees images of the past flash by in his mind. When Qizhen discovers Xiangyi, she is terrified and guarded. However, she soon realises that he has lost his memory from that heavy blow she'd administered. She then feels guilty and sympathetic towards him. Qizhen also observes that Xiangyi and Siru seem to get along very well. She sees that Xiangyi has recovered his good-natured self, along with his sincerity and positive attitude to life. She wonders if it is a good thing for him to lose his memory after all, since he is able to live healthily and happily now. At the same time, Haiming has filled the vacant spot of Tongtong's father. His sincerity moves Qizhen and their feelings for each other progress further. She decides to hide the truth from Xiangyi, so that both of them can get a new lease of life and leave the painful past behind.

Siru used to co-manage a chain of “IN” coffee cafes with her ex-boyfriend Nelson who subsequently betrayed her, leaving her bankrupt. She had failed in her previous business, but had fortunately received a helping hand from Uncle Zhang. She has always wished to repay him for his kindness; Uncle Zhang tells her to help Xiangyi instead. With Siru's planning and financial support, and Xiangyi's diligent research and experiments, Ah Du's Special Roast Duck Shop opens its doors. Great reviews come in from everywhere and they open branches one after another within a few months.

Xiangyi's memory flashes have finally connected to form a frightening string of images. His physical abuse of his wife and daughter, as well as his alcohol abuse are vivid in his mind. Regaining his memory brings him much pain and guilt. He begs Qizhen for forgiveness and hopes she will allow him to make it up to her. At the same time, Siru and Xiangyi have shared many ups and downs in their entrepreneurship venture, giving them many wonderful memories. Siru expresses her feelings for him. Xiangyi is torn. He wishes to make it up to Qizhen and Tongtong for his wrongdoings, yet is now faced with a wonderful benefactor who has helped him stand on his feet again....

Qizhen is happy for Xiangyi's success in his business venture. She has originally intended to accept Haiming's marriage proposal, so that Tongtong can have a happy family. However, with Xiangyi's recovery, Qizhen is faced with a dilemma. Should she leave Haiming, who has been so understanding and loving towards her, or bury the past with Xiangyi and move on to a new life ahead? Siru was kidnapped by her ex- boyfriend, and tortured in front of his accomplice Jenny. Siru then passes a message to Uncle Zhang, Qi Zhen and Xiang Yi (whose vision has deteriorated due to the continuous side effects of his head injury). The confrontation leads to a fight, ending in Nelson being crushed to death by a bag of falling cement. After the incident, Xiang Yi, now blinded, had decided to stay away from Siru. Haiming fell into a coma due to injuries from the fight.

In the finale, Qizhen marries the still-comatose Haiming, while Siru continues to take care of Xiang Yi secretly. One day, when Xiang Yi attempts to cross the road, Siru shouts a warning to him, revealing the identity of his mysterious caretaker.

== Cast ==
- Ivy Lee as Han Qi Zhen
- Shaun Chen as Du Xiang Yi
- Edmund Chen as Chen Hai Ming
- Phyllis Quek as Xie Si Ru
- Chen Shucheng as Zhang Bo
- Belinda Lee as Coco Chen
- Vivian Lai as Jenny
- Jin Yinji as Mummy Chen
- Ye Shipin as Da Tou Cai
- Huang Shinan as Nelson Teo
- Nelson Chia as Sayang
- Joey Swee

== Production ==
The drama series' producer is He Fa Ming 何法明 and Su Yin 苏殷 as its scriptwriter.

== Release ==
The serial debuted on 13 November 2007.

== Viewership ==
The viewership of this drama serial did not meet initial expectations during the first week of telecast.

Week	Date	Average number of audience in five weekdays (Round off to nearest thousand)
Week 1	13 November 2007 to 16 November 2007	561, 000
Week 2	19 November 2007 to 23 November 2007	584, 000
Week 3	26 November 2007 to 30 November 2007	604, 000
Week 4	3 December 2007 to 7 December 2007	624, 000

== See also ==
- List of programmes broadcast by Mediacorp Channel 8
