= First Touch =

- Directed by: Emida Natalaray; Meng Ong
- Starring: Edmund Chen; Amy Cheng; Nick Shen; Vernetta Lopez
- Country of origin: Singapore
- Original language: English
- No. of episodes: Season 1: 13; Season 2:

Production
- Executive producer: Emida Natalaray
- Running time: 45 min
- Production company: MediaCorp

Original release
- Network: MediaCorp Channel 5
- Release: 18 January 2002

First Touch is a Singaporean English-language medical drama which aired in 2002 and 2003. The series is about a team of doctors, nurses and staff at a hospital obstetrics and gynaecology department.

== Cast ==
- Edmund Chen as Dr. Charles Yong, chief of gynaecology
- Amy Cheng
- Nick Shen as Dr. Wee Teck Meng
- Ferlin Jayatissa as Dr. Vasso
- Vernetta Lopez as Dr Kelly Chan
- Wee Soon Hui

=== Supporting/Guest/Recurring Cast ===
- Steph Song as Dr. Ann Lee
- Natalie Faye as Lee Hoon
- Timothy Nga as Steve Lai
- Noor Naserimah as Nurse Faridah
- Alan Tern
- Mindee Ong
- Joey Swee
- Cheryl Chin
