= Family Matters (Singaporean TV series) =

Singaporean television drama series

- 法庭俏佳人
- Genre: Legal drama Family
- Written by: Ng Kah Huay (黄佳华)
- Starring: Ivy Lee; Thomas Ong; Terence Cao; Cynthia Koh
- Opening theme: Trust (信任) by Cai Mei Yi (蔡美仪)
- Country of origin: Singapore
- Original language: Mandarin
- No. of episodes: 20

Production
- Producers: Chia Mien Yang 谢敏洋; Lai Lee Thin 赖丽婷
- Running time: 45 minutes

Original release
- Network: MediaCorp Channel 8
- Release: 11 September 2006

Family Matters (Chinese: 法庭俏佳人) is a 2006 Singaporean Mandarin television drama series which was aired on Mediacorp TV Channel 8. Starring Ivy Lee and Thomas Ong, the series depicts the lives of two lawyers who specialise in divorce cases in the Family Court of Singapore, and also their romance which is fraught with troubles.

== Plot ==
As a child, Zhao Shuyang (Ivy Lee) was adopted by Zheng Zhigang (Chen Shucheng) when her parents got separated and remarried. Raised by Zheng, Shuyang grew up to become a promising lawyer, specializing in divorce cases.

Having been loved by her adoptive parents and stepbrother, Zheng Weilun (Terence Cao), Shuyang yearns to marry. Her stepbrother, Weilun, tries to woo her but to no avail, because Shuyang is romantically interested in Gao Ming.

However, Shuyang is shocked when she finds out the truth about Gao Ming (Thomas Ong), her adoptive father's illegitimate son. To make matters worse, she finds herself falling for the ever-flamboyant Gao Ming. Towards the end, she contracts stomach cancer with little hope of survival.

In the last episode, Shuyang chooses Gao Ming and Wei Lun is sent to prison. Shuyang manages to keep her condition in control by undergoing treatment for a year. Gao Ming And Shuyang then get married.

== Cast ==
- Ivy Lee as Zhao Shuyang
- Thomas Ong as Gao Ming
- Terence Cao as Zheng Weilun
- Cynthia Koh as Guan Ji'er
- Chen Shucheng as Zheng Zhigang
- Lin Yuyun as Li Chunling
- Lin Meijiao as Gao Wei
- Wang Yuqing as Xie Xhangfeng
- Nick Shen as Shi Baobao
- Huang Dingrong as Rain
- Rebecca Lim as Luo Manshi
- Tan Xin Yi as Young Shuyang
- Li Jiaxun as Young Weilun

== Accolades ==
Accolade	Award	Nominee	Result	Ref
Star Awards 2006 Show 2	Best Actress	Ivy Lee	Won	
Star Awards 2006 Show 2	Best Supporting Actress	Lin Meijiao	Nominated	

== See also ==
- List of programmes broadcast by Mediacorp Channel 8
