= House of Joy =

- Title card
- 欢乐满屋
- Genre: Family
- Written by: Ng Kah Huay 黄佳华
- Directed by: 罗温温
- Starring: Ivy Lee; Chen Hanwei; Cynthia Koh; Edmund Chen
- Opening theme: 有你们在 by Chew Sin Huey
- Ending theme: 让我陪着你 by Derrick Hoh
- Country of origin: Singapore
- Original language: Mandarin
- No. of episodes: 20

Production
- Running time: approx. 45 minutes per episode

Original release
- Network: MediaCorp TV Channel 8
- Release: 6 November – 1 December 2006

House of Joy (Chinese: 欢乐满屋) is a Singaporean Mandarin drama series aired on MediaCorp TV Channel 8. The series debuted on 6 November 2006 and was telecast weekday nights at 9pm. It has a total of 20 episodes. It stars Ivy Lee, Chen Hanwei, Cynthia Koh & Edmund Chen as the casts of the series.

In the initial few days of the telecast, numerous viewers provided feedback to the TV station on the drama series. Most questioned the appropriateness of the title House of Joy when there were too many emotional scenes for the character which Ivy Lee portrayed. A spokesperson for the station then replied that the word Joy in the title is derived from the word Huan Le in Chinese which is a combination of the name of the 2 lead characters - Yihuan and Letian.

The series focuses on those who continue to strive on to overcome their financial and social problems despite being debt-ridden.

== Synopsis ==
Zheng Yihuan (Ivy Lee) is at the prime of her life at 33. She has a steady job as a finance company manager, a loving husband Xu Zhiguo (Edmund Chen) and enjoys a harmonious family life. To add to her blissfulness, she is expecting her first child, a long-awaited piece of good news.

As the credit manager of a bank, Yihuan has seen how debts incurred from overspending have broken many families up. Hence she is cautious with spending and offers the same advice to her family. But tragedy struck when she discovered that her own husband has turned to gambling and incurred large amounts of debts, and he even ran away after embezzling company funds. To add to her woes, her mother and two siblings also fell into debt.

With a new born child in tow and insurmountable debts, how will she cope? Always the pillar of strength of her family, can she now face up to reality and continue with life bravely?

== Cast ==
- Ivy Lee as Zheng Yihuan
- Chen Hanwei as Huang Letian
- Cynthia Koh as Zheng Shuangxi, Yihuan's sister
- Edmund Chen as Xu Zhiguo
- Allan Wu as Zheng Sanji, Yihuan's brother
- May Phua as Chen Feifei, Sanji's fiancée/wife
- Adam Chen as Zen, Shuangxi's boyfriend
- Hong Huifang as Lin Yahao, Yihuan's mother
- Jin Yinji as Wang Xiulian, Zhiguo's mother
- Ling Lee
- Huang Shinan
- Yao Wenlong as Ben
- Jaime Teo as Tan Ming

== Awards ==
Award	Nominee	Result
Best Actress 最佳女主角	Ivy Lee	Nominated
