= Season of Love (Singaporean TV series) =

1998 Singaporean television series

- Title card
- Traditional Chinese: 甜甜的季節
- Simplified Chinese: 甜甜的季节
- Literal meaning: "The Sweet Season"
- Hanyu Pinyin: Tián tián de jì jié
- Genre: Romance; Drama
- Written by: Zhou Mingzhen; Chua Swan
- Directed by: Tay Peck Choo
- Starring: James Lye; Ivy Lee; Bernard Tan; Cynthia Koh; May Phua
- Opening theme: "Still in Time" by Fann Wong
- Ending theme: "Understanding" by Evelyn Tan
- Country of origin: Singapore
- Original language: Mandarin
- No. of seasons: 1
- No. of episodes: 15

Production
- Executive producer: Chua Swan
- Cinematography: Hong Meilian; Wang Youli; Huang Guozhong; Liao Yongsong
- Editor: Jiang Jianhua
- Running time: approx. 45 minutes
- Production company: Mediacorp

Original release
- Network: Channel 8
- Release: December 1998 – January 1999

Season of Love (Chinese: 甜甜的季节) is a 1998 Singaporean romantic drama series starring James Lye, Ivy Lee, Bernard Tan, Cynthia Koh and May Phua. It began production in September 1998 and was aired on Mediacorp Channel 8 in December 1998. A relatively small budget production with production costs of only about S$4,000 per episode, Season of Love ranked among the top ten most viewed local drama series in 1998, attracting 730,000 viewers on average. A likely reason for this was because it was James Lye's second time acting in a Mandarin drama, and this was heavily popularized in the media.

== Cast ==
- James Lye as Ding Weijie
- Ivy Lee as Lin Xiaoshuang
- Bernard Tan as Shen Wenbin
- Cynthia Koh as Xu Liwen
- May Phua as Shen Jiahui
- Andrew Koh as Li Dingyuan
- Zhu Xiufeng as Weijie's mother
- Yu Jialun as Liwen's father
- Andi Lin as Pan Lei
- Malcolm Ng as Xing
- Yang Yue as Michael Ong
- Wu Weiqiang as Fu Zhiqiang
- Ye Shipin as Niu Xuefo
- Zhong Liqin as Liwen's mother
- Huang Jiaqiang as Yang Lisheng
- Sunny Pang as Flower shop owner
