= The Reunion (TV series) =

- 顶天立地
- Written by: Ang Eng Tee 洪荣狄
- Directed by: Loo Yin Kam 卢燕金; Lai Lee Thin 赖丽婷
- Starring: Tay Ping Hui; Chew Chor Meng; Terence Cao; Yvonne Lim
- Opening theme: 爱恨随它 by Lee Wei Song, sung by Tay Ping Hui
- Ending theme: 越飞越高越寂寞 sung by Jacelyn Tay
- Country of origin: Singapore
- Original language: Mandarin
- No. of episodes: 31

Production
- Producer: Kok Len Shoong 郭令送
- Running time: 45 minutes (approx.)

Original release
- Network: Mediacorp Channel 8
- Release: 26 December 2001

The Reunion (顶天立地) is a Singaporean drama which aired on MediaCorp Channel 8 in December 2001. It was written by acclaimed award-winning script writer Ang Eng Tee, who would go on to produce popular and critically acclaimed dramas such as Holland V, The Little Nyonya, Together and Breakout.

== Plot ==
The series traces the lives of three close and best friends named Lee Ke Chun (Chew Chor Meng), Lau Ah Chow (Tay Ping Hui) and Tan Guan Kun (Terence Cao) and chronicles the ups and downs of their lives. Their friendship is however put to the test under the onslaught of greed, love, jealousy, hatred and betrayal.

On Christmas Eve 1999, famous lawyer Lee Ke Chun hosts a Christmas party for the societal elite at his bungalow, under the watchful eye of a team of CID police officers led by Lau Ah Chow, Lee's former army buddy (and now his bitter rival in love). However, the event is disrupted by the appearance of their comrade Tan Guan Kun, a fugitive wanted by the authorities for murder, who holds Lee at gunpoint in an act of revenge for the latter's past deeds. An intense standoff ensues as the three brothers (Lee, Lau and Tan) reunite after many years apart.

The story then flashes back to 1985, when the three men are fellow commandos-in-training in the Singapore Army, though hailing from vastly different backgrounds. Lee is the most educated of the trio and aspires to be a lawyer, Lau has a history of confinement in a boy's home due to acts of theft, while Tan is a happy-go-lucky youth obsessed with get-rich-quick schemes. After completing his National Service, Lee pursues a career as a lawyer and resorts to ruthless means to cement himself among the elites in the field, in the process exploiting and eventually murdering Tan's love interest Lu Xiuwen (Yvonne Lim), as well as forcefully taking to wife Choo Yu Hang (Wong Li-lin), daughter of top lawyer Steven Choo (Huang Wenyong) and girlfriend of Lau. Lau's outstanding military performance earns him a place in the Special Operations Taskforce, and he goes undercover overseas on a dangerous assignment, during which Choo is deliberately misled and seized by Lee, who thereby earns Lau's enmity. Tan's attempt to create a windfall results in his falling into bad company in the Thai underworld, and he becomes a lethal assassin and drug trafficker. News of Lu's death by Lee further enrages him, and he swears violent revenge.

After completing his undercover mission, Lau joins the CID and is tasked with bringing the now-fugitive Tan to justice. In this way, the three brothers-in-arms end up on opposite sides of the law, leading to their final bitter reunion in 1999.

== Cast ==
- Chew Chor Meng as Lee Ke Chun (Li Kechun)
- Terence Cao as Tan Guan Kun (Chen Guanjun)
- Tay Ping Hui as Lau Ah Chow (Liu Yazhou)
- Carole Lin as Diana Lau
- Yvonne Lim as Lu Xiuwen
- Wong Li Lin as Choo Yu Hang (Zhu Yuhang)
- Joey Swee as Long Mingzhu
- Michelle Liow as Wang Xiaoyang
- Huang Wenyong as Steven Choo
- Hong Huifang as Anne Yeo
- Andrea De Cruz as Seow Luolin
- Nick Shen
- Koh Chieng Mun as Mrs Tan Shuilian
- Henry Thia as Huang Feihong
- Lin Yisheng as Ah Dong
- Pan Chao'an as Thai Pa

== 2002 Accolades ==
| Award | Nominee | Result |
|---|---|---|
| Best Actor 最佳男主角 | Chew Chor Meng 周初明 | Nominated |
| Best Actor 最佳男主角 | Terence Cao 曹国辉 | Nominated |
| Best Supporting Actor 最佳男配角 | Nick Shen 沈炜竣 | Nominated |
| Best Supporting Actress 最佳女配角 | Joey Swee 徐绮 | Nominated |
| Best Drama Serial 最佳电视剧 | The Reunion | Nominated |
| Best Director 最佳导演 | Lai Lee Thin 赖丽婷 | Won |
