= Edmund Chen =

Singaporean actor and illustrator (born 1961)

- Born: Tan Kai Yuan; 4 February 1961 (age 65); Colony of Singapore
- Occupations: Actor; host; illustrator
- Years active: 1987–present
- Spouse: Xiang Yun (m. 1989)
- Children: Chen Xi; Chen Yixin
- Family: Eric Chen (brother); Loretta Chen (sister)

Chinese name
- Traditional Chinese: 陳之財
- Simplified Chinese: 陈之财
- Hanyu Pinyin: Chén Zhīcái

Edmund Tan Kai Yuan (born 4 February 1961), professionally known as Edmund Chen, is a Singaporean actor and artist. He began his career in 1987 and rose to become one of Singapore's most prominent and popular actors during the 1990s and early 2000s.

== Media career ==
Chen entered the entertainment industry after completing the SBC (predecessor of MediaCorp) 7th drama training course in 1987. He starred in several high-profile dramas such as sci-fi drama series Star Maiden, Air Force and police thriller Patrol, where he met and later married co-star Xiang Yun.

During the late 1990s he temporarily left showbiz for several years to concentrate on other projects.

After returning to MediaCorp his popularity soared and he won the Top 10 Most Popular Male Artistes award seven consecutive times. During the Star Awards 2007 25th anniversary special, he and Ivy Lee, who played his on-screen partner many times, were named the Top 5 Favourite On-screen Couples for their roles as husband and wife in Double Happiness.

He left MediaCorp at the end of 2007 for family reasons but made a brief return to the screens as a guest star in Channel 5 comedy Calefare and the second season of Channel U production Perfect Cut. Besides acting, he has also presented and hosted shows ranging from sports events to variety shows to charity galas.

In 2003, Chen acted in a Hong Kong film, Turn Left, Turn Right as Dr Hu, and in 2008, acted as the father of Chun-Li in Street Fighter: The Legend of Chun-Li.

Chen directed his first feature film Echoing Love, which consists of six shorts directed by six different people and the cast includes Erica Lee, Alaric Tay, Vincent Ng, Nathaniel Ho and his wife Xiang Yun. It was screened at the 24th Singapore International Film Festival in 2011, where it won a Special Achievement Award at the Silver Screen Awards.

Chen also worked as a brand ambassador and spokesman for many firms and products, including Beijing 101 Hair Consultants, Mitsubishi Electric, Chien Chi Tow, G- Spa, Donut Empire and KKC Property in Singapore and throughout the Asian region.

== Literary career ==
Chen left the entertainment industry in 2007 and he began writing and illustrating Chinese language children's books. Two of his titles Dino Rulez! (欢迎来到我们的世界) and Little Otters To The Rescue (水獭宝宝救爸爸) have been selected by the National Arts Council for its yearly catalogue.

In 2014, Chen was voted Best Author for New Children's Books in Southeast Asia for his picture book Little Otters To The Rescue.

== Personal life ==
Chen is the eldest of three children. His younger brother Eric manages an events management company, while his younger sister is the theatre director and entrepreneur Loretta Chen.

Chen married actress Xiang Yun in 1989 after meeting on the sets of Patrol and they have two children; a daughter Yixin and a son Chen Xi.

On 14 January 2026, he was charged with one count of driving without reasonable consideration for other road users, resulting in an accident. He was sentenced to five days in jail and a five year driving ban.

== Filmography ==
=== Film ===
Year	Title	Role	Notes	Ref.
1998	Yellow Wedding			
1998	Eternal Love			
1998	Super Cop			
1999	Where Got Problem?	Chen		
1999	Ghostories			
2002	Sharpened Pencil			
2002	The Eye	Dr Lo		
2003	Turn Left, Turn Right	Dr Hu		
2007	Saigon Eclipse			
2008	Street Fighter: The Legend of Chun-Li	Xiang		
2009	Liliang			
2011	Echoing Love		As director	

=== Television series ===
Year	Title	Role	Notes	Ref.
1987	Sunshine After Rain 雨过天晴	Chen Junjie		
1987	Moving On 变迁	Ah Wen		
1988	Star Maiden 飞越银河	Jin Guixiang		
1988	Airforce	Gan Qifeng		
1988	The Last Applause 舞榭歌台	Guo Xiaoting (Qihua)		
1988	Mystery – Piano 迷离夜 之《琴》	Tan Jialun		
1989	When Hearts Touch 似水柔情	Xu Daimei		
1989	Fortune Hunters 钻石人生	Guo Juncheng		
1989	Patrol	Luo Yifeng		
1989	Turn of the Tide 浮沉	Zhou Guodong		
1990	Finishing Line	Zhong Chongguang		
1990	Happy Family 开心家族	Song Kecheng		
1991	The Darkest Hour 列血青春	Ma Zhongyuan		
1992	Fiery Passion 烈焰焚情	Mingliang		
1992	Crime and Passion 执法先锋	Lin Wenbin		
1993	Hidden Truth 法网晴天	Zhou Xiaoping		
1993	Switch 妙鬼临门	Li Tianliang		
1994	The Blazing Trail 兰桂坊血案			
1994	Those Were the Days 生命擂台	Yan Kaicong		
1995	The Teochew Family			
1995	The Rangers 铁血雄心			
1995	Heartbeat 医胆仁心	Ye Haowei		
1995	Pointed Triangle 杀之恋			
1995	It's My World 还我半天边			
1995	A Different Life 妈姐情缘	Shen Tianle		
1996	Ace Cops 妙警点三八			
1996	Courting Trouble 婚姻法庭	Yang Jianan		
1996	Life on the Line 魂断四面佛	Xu Mingyang		
1997	Immortal Love 不老的传说	Su Youming		
1997	Crimes and Tribulations 狮城奇案录	Liang Shui		
2000	Catherine Listening to the Rain			
2001	The Invincible Squad			
2001	The Hotel	Emil Qin		
2001	The Stratagem 世纪攻略	Zhou Jingxue		
2001	Beyond the Axis of Truth	Chen Xueming		
2002	First Touch	Dr Charles Yong		
2002	The Vagrant			
2002	Brotherhood			
2002	The Wing of Desire 天使的诱惑	Qin Kailang		
2002	Law 2002 法内情2002	Qiu Zhishao		
2002	First Touch II	Dr Charles Yong		
2002	Innocently Guilty 法内有情天	Qiu Zhishao		
2003	My Love, My Home 同一屋檐下	Situ Enming/Situ Ocean		
2003	A Toast of Love			
2004	When the Time Comes 一线之间	Jieren		
2004	Double Happiness	Luo Jiaqi		
2004	The Crime Hunters	Lan Tinghui		
2004	Man at Forty	Chen Longwei		
2004	Timeless Gift 遗情未了	Wang Yu		
2005	Lady of Leisure 贤妻靓母	Chen Guoqing		
2005	Zero to Hero	Xie Jizu		
2005	Beyond the aXis of Truth II	Chen Xueming		
2006	Women of Times	Jia Zengtu		
2006	House of Joy	Xu Zhiguo		
2007	Live Again	Chen Haiming		
2007	The Golden Path	Cheng-Ge		
2008	Calefare	Champion Zhang		
2009	Perfect Cut 2	Win Cheong		
2013	Serangoon Road	James Lim		
2017	Life Less Ordinary	Ye Chengda		

== Awards and nominations ==
Year	Award	Category	Nominated work	Result	Ref
1996	Star Awards	Top 10 Most Popular Male Artistes	—N/a	Nominated	
1997	Star Awards	Top 10 Most Popular Male Artistes	—N/a	Nominated	
2001	Star Awards	Best Actor	Beyond the Axis of Truth (as Chen Xueming)	Nominated	
2001	Star Awards	Top 10 Most Popular Male Artistes	—N/a	Won	
2002	Star Awards	Top 10 Most Popular Male Artistes	—N/a	Won	
2003	Star Awards	Top 10 Most Popular Male Artistes	—N/a	Won	
2003	Asian Television Award	Best Actor	First Touch II (as Dr Charles Yong)	Nominated	
2004	Star Awards	Best Actor	Man at Forty (as Chen Longwei)	Nominated	
2004	Star Awards	Top 10 Most Popular Male Artistes	—N/a	Won	
2005	Star Awards	Top 10 Most Popular Male Artistes	—N/a	Won	
2006	Star Awards	Top 10 Most Popular Male Artistes	—N/a	Won	
2007	Star Awards	Top 10 Most Popular Male Artistes	—N/a	Won	
