= Beyond the Axis of Truth =

- 法医X档案
- Genre: Police procedural Mystery
- Written by: Ho Hee Ann
- Directed by: Fang Jiafu 方家福
- Starring: Edmund Chen; Ivy Lee; Chen Liping; Chen Shucheng; Nick Shen
- Opening theme: 不想说 by Phyllis Quek
- Ending theme: 睡美人 by Phyllis Quek
- Country of origin: Singapore
- Original language: Mandarin
- No. of episodes: 30

Production
- Producer: Lim Gim Lan
- Running time: 45 minutes (approx.)

Original release
- Network: Mediacorp Channel 8
- Release: 20 June 2001

Related
- Beyond The aXis of Truth II

Beyond the aXis of Truth (Chinese: 法医X档案) is a Singaporean Mandarin supernatural/sci-fi crime drama series which aired in June 2001. It stars Edmund Chen, Ivy Lee, Chen Liping, Chen Shucheng & Nick Shen as the casts of this series.

== Synopsis ==
Forensic pathologist Chen Xueming (Edmund Chen) and CID officer Wu Pinyu (Ivy Lee) work together on several manslaughter cases, each of which involves unnatural phenomenons that can only be described as supernatural such as reality-bending, cryokinesis, walking dead/vampirism, time-travel and plant-human hybrids

Case 1: A woman named Liao Yongwei (Vivian Lai) having an extra-marital affair with paraplegic Li Zeyuan (Chen Tianwen) is drowned. When Zeyuan is hospitalised, Yongwei's estranged husband is mysteriously attacked at a bowling alley and later burnt at the hospital.

Case 2: Xueming and Pinyu are called to a string of bodies which showed signs of having been frozen at some point, beginning with two police officers who had been escorting a shoplifter. Nothing seems to match up and their best lead is a mentally disturbed young woman, the same woman that the officers had arrested for shoplifting.

Case 3: A vehicle accident fatality was reportedly seen walking out of the ambulance. Shortly after, several accidents and incidents connected to the "dead man" occur but the presence of blood and no matching victim proves baffling. It wasn't long before a string of corpses of criminals wanted by the police are found drained of their blood, making Xueming and Pinyu suspect they might be dealing with no ordinary criminal.

Case 4: A man discovers he can return to certain points of time, only to learn that time is not something to be messed with

Case 5: A series of incidents ultimately leads to Xueming discovering that his lover Li Yiwen (Priscelia Chan) is in fact a plant-human hybrid. This discovery would lead to tragedy as Yiwen is later found dead, having seemingly been killed in a brutal manner...

== Cast ==
- Edmund Chen as Chen Xueming
- Ivy Lee as Wu Pinyu
- Chen Liping as Jiang Meiqi
- Ye Shipin as Li Guo'en
- Nick Shen as Zhuge Fei
- Chen Shucheng as Prof Michael Wu
- Vivian Lai as Liao Yongwei
- Chen Tianwen as Li Zeyuan
- Priscelia Chan as Li Yiwen
- Richard Low as Song Tianli
- Huang Bingjie as Song Wenxin
- Yang Libing as Song Shanni
- Shawn Lee as younger Xueming
- Pan Lingling as Guo Mingliang
- Yao Wenlong as Dr Mike

== Accolades ==
Year	Ceremony	Award	Nominee	Result	Ref
2001	Star Awards	Best Director	Leong Lye Lin	Nominated	
2001	Star Awards	Best Screenplay 最佳剧本	Ho Hee Ann	Won	
2001	Star Awards	Best Actor	Edmund Chen	Nominated	
2001	Star Awards	Best Actress	Chen Liping	Nominated	
2001	Star Awards	Best Supporting Actor	Chen Shucheng	Nominated	
2001	Star Awards	Best Drama Serial	—N/a	Nominated	
