= The Hotel (Singaporean TV series) =

- 大酒店
- Genre: Dramedy
- Written by: Hong Xi 洪夕 周少文
- Directed by: 黎致明
- Starring: Edmund Chen; Ivy Lee; Chen Hanwei; Jacelyn Tay; Chen Liping; May Phua; Yang Libing
- Country of origin: Singapore
- Original language: Chinese
- No. of episodes: 20

Production
- Producer: 马家骏
- Running time: approx. 45 minutes

Original release
- Network: MediaCorp TV Channel 8
- Release: December 2001 – 2002

The Hotel (Chinese: 大酒店) is a Singapore Chinese drama which was telecast on Singapore's television station, Mediacorp, in 2001. It was released in December 2001 and was slated to be the blockbuster for the year 2001. The series has been rerun on MediaCorp Channel 8 and also on AZN Television. It stars Edmund Chen, Ivy Lee, Chen Hanwei, Jacelyn Tay, Chen Liping, May Phua and Yang Libing as the casts of this series.

This series is unique as it has a large ensemble guest cast featuring over 95% of MediaCorp Channel 8 artistes appearing as hotel guests, including Zoe Tay, Gurmit Singh (Phua Chu Kang), Xiang Yun and many others. Most artistes' character names were similar to their own and, unusual for a drama series, their names were introduced on screen, not only in the credits at the end.

== Synopsis ==
The Hotel revolves around a family-run business named Queen's Hotel which has been around for 2 decades. It is Christmas time and the staff are busy running the hotel and preparing for guests. Jointly run by Seto (Ivy Lee), her sister, Rainbow (Jacelyn Tay), brother, Ah Boy (Andi Lim) and sister-in-law Lychee (Yang Libing), their 3-star hotel goes downhill due to poor management. Alarmed at the poor financial situation, sleeping major shareholders and Emil (Edmund Chen) and his younger brother Sunny (Chen Hanwei) step in to salvage the failing business. Emil introduces a series of budget cuts, which results in friction between the brothers and Seto's family. He strives to instill professionalism and a customer-oriented attitude into his staff, but his straight-talking demeanour makes him much hated, especially by Seto.

Very different in character, Seto and Emil do not see eye to eye with each other on many issues. Emil however admires Rainbow's frankness and decides to court her. Seto, who deems men as good-for-nothings, is unexpectedly drawn to Sunny's manliness. Sunny and Rainbow are dreadfully worried about the affections of each other's elder siblings; they pose as lovers in order to fend them off. However, the two of them fall genuinely in love instead, leaving Seto and Emil devastated.

As fate would have it, a series of events in the hotel dissolves the animosity between Seto and Emil and they soon develop feelings for each other. However, pride prevents them from admitting their feelings.

Under Emil's management, the hotel business sees some improvement. A businessman offers to take over the hotel but is rejected by Emil as his beloved has a stake in it as well. Just as he finally decides to express his love for Seto openly, the hotel is served with a lawsuit by a mysterious lawyer who turns out to have a long-buried grudge against Emil and Sunny.

== Cast ==
=== Main cast ===
| Cast | Role | Description |
|---|---|---|
| Edmund Chen | Emil Qin aka Email King | Hotel General Manager; Elder brother of Sunny |
| Ivy Lee | Miss Seto "Caidie" | Hotel Resident Manager; Elder sister of Rainbow |
| Chen Hanwei | Sunny | Front Office Manager; Younger brother of Emil |
| Jacelyn Tay | Rainbow | Public Relations and Purchasing Manager; Younger sister of Seto |
| Chen Liping | Pang Yuyun (Dodo) | Housekeeping Manager; Cousin of Seto, Rainbow and Ah Boy |
| Huang Shinan | Zhang Dage ("Tiger") | Supervisor of Maintenance |
| May Phua | Kitty | Hotel receiptionist |
| Andi Lim | Ah Boy | Hotel chef Brother of Seto and Rainbow; Husband of Lychee |
| Yang Libing | Lychee | Hotel Food & beverage Manager; Wife of Ah Boy |
| Yao Wenlong | Dr Long | Hotel resident doctor |
| Brandon Wong | Ben | Hotel bellboy |
| Carol Tham | Judy | Hotel receiptionist |
| Raymond Tan | Joey | Hotel waiter |
| Zhu Xiufeng | Chen Lianfeng | Hotel housekeeper |
| Pei Xiaoling | Liu Ling 刘铃 | Hotel housekeeper |

=== Star appearances ===
| Episode | Artiste(s) | Role | |
|---|---|---|---|
| 1 | Zoe Tay | Biyu 碧玉 | Seto's ex-classmate Johnny Ma's first wife |
| 1 | Pan Lingling | Nancy Lim | Johnny Ma's second wife |
| 1 | Chen Tianwen | Raymond Boo | Johnny Ma's lawyer |
| 1 | Terence Cao | Johnny Ma | Plastic surgeon |
| 1 | Yang Tianfu | Brother Jie 杰哥 | Loan shark |
| 2 | Huang Wenyong | Mr Goh | Hotel guest |
| 2 | Tay Ping Hui | Bill Fong | Travel magazine writer / hotel guest |
| 2 | Andrea De Cruz | Grace Wong | Bill's wife |
| 3 | Gurmit Singh | Phua Chu Kang | General contractor hired by Dage |
| 3 | Li Wenhai | Mr Li | |
| 4 | Chew Chor Meng | Fang Baiming 方白明 | Airline pilot |
| 4 | Joey Swee | Xu Qiqi 许淇绮 | Air stewardess |
| 4 | Liang Tian | Uncle Tian 田伯 | Fang Baiming's uncle |
| 4 | Yan Bingliang | Yan Jinliang 严金量 | Hotel's meat supplier |
| 4 | Huang Bingjie | Big Head 大头 | Airline pilot |
| 5 | Zheng Geping | Tang Tiancai 唐天财 | Neurosurgeon; Childhood friend of Seto and Rainbow |
| 6 | Yvonne Lim | Lan Chuping 蓝楚萍 | |
| 6 | Xiang Yun | Diana | Chuping's older sister |
| 6 | Roni | Mohamad Ali | |
| 7 | Jack Neo | Liang Guoqiang 梁国强 | An acrobatic troupe |
| 7 | Mark Lee | Li Xiaohuang 李小煌 | An acrobatic troupe |
| 7 | Henry Thia | Cheng Zhihui 程志辉 | An acrobatic troupe |
| 7 | Patricia Mok | Mo Xuling 莫旭玲 | An acrobatic troupe |
| 7 | Lin Yisheng | Lin Fengsheng 林丰盛 | Miss Seto's ex-boyfriend |
| 8 | Sharon Au | Sharon | Rainbow's former university mate |
| 8 | Alan Tern | Wang Yafu 王亚复 | Sharon's fiance |
| 8 | Richard Low | Liu Tianyi 刘添益 | Sharon's father Underworld boss |
| 9 | Moses Lim | Nishimura Jumin 西村寿民 | Japanese hotel guest |
| 10 | Cynthia Koh | Xu Yizhen 许宜珍 | A blind pianist |
| 10 | Deng Mao Hui | Liang Zihui 梁子辉 | Yizhen's son |
| 10 | Liang Weidong | Liang Ruidong 梁瑞东 | Yizhen's Ex-husband |
| 11 | Huang Yiliang | Huang Zhongliang 黄忠良 | Taiwanese hotel guest |
| 11 | Tracer Wong | Wang Jinxiang 王金香 | Huang Zhongliang's wife |
| 11 | Priscelia Chan | Huang Xiaomei 黄小梅 | Huang's daughter |
| 11 | Nick Shen | Huang Dajun 黄大峻 | Huang's son |
| 12 | Vincent Ng | Zou Dahai 邹大海 | Hotel bellboy |
| 12 | Wong Li-Lin | Lynn Song Leling 宋乐玲 | Movie director |
| 12 | Hong Huifang | Gong Jingfang 龚靖芳 | Lynn's mother |
| 12 | Ryan Choo | Chow Weng Foo 周文福 | |
| 13 | Florence Tan | Chen Yunli 陈云丽 | Runaway Chinese bride |
| 13 | Cassandra See | Xue Aishan 薛爱珊 | Hotel guest |
| 13 | Robin Leong | Rob Liang Hanru 梁瀚儒 | Hotel guest |
| 13 | Andrew Seow | Chen Youyou 陈有友 | Yunli's fiance |
| 14 | Fann Wong | Rose 玫瑰 / Ye Xiaofang 叶晓芳 | Hotel guest participating in an auction |
| 14 | Xie Shaoguang | Xu Wenguang 许文光 | |
| 14 | Zhou Quanxi | Gilbert | |
| 14 | Ye Shipin | Ye Guopin 叶国品 | |
| 14 | Pierre Png | James Poon | |
| 15 | Dasmond Koh | Yang Maorong 杨茂荣 | Architect; Hotel guest |
| 15 | Aileen Tan | Yang Ruizhen 杨瑞贞 | Yang Maorong's older sister |
| 16 | Christopher Lee | Shawn | |
| 16 | Huang Biren | Huang Yiren 黄伊人 | |
| 17 | Jin Yinji | Dr Jin 金医生 | Lychee's gynaecologist Penny's mother Emil's godmother |
| 17 | Lin Meijiao | Penny | Emil's old friend Hotel guest |
| 17 | Rayson Tan | Chen Yiming 陈一鸣 | Penny's husband |
| 17 | Carole Lin | Lin Peipei 林佩佩 | Chen Yiming's secretary |
| 18 | Qi Yuwu | Qi Weiwu 戚威武 | University students / hotel guests |
| 18 | Vivian Lai | Lai Meiling 赖美伶 | University students / hotel guests |
| 18 | Fiona Xie | Zhuang Xinyu 庄心瑜 | University students / hotel guests |
| 18 | Huang De Yuan | Huang Yiyuan 黄逸远 | University students / hotel guests |
| 18 | Chen Guohua | Xie Jiehua 谢杰华 | PI hired by Xinyu's dad |
| 18 | Mai Haowei | Zhuang Qianwei 庄谦为 | Xinyu's dad |
| 18 | Li Nanxing | Cloudy | Rainbow's online friend Later Dodo's admirer |
| 19 | Chen Shucheng | Richard Lee | Business partner |
| 19 | Chen Huihui | June Tay | lawyer |
| 20 | Fang Hui | Helen | Seto and Rainbow's mother |
| 20 | Jeff Wang | Jeff | Hotel guest |

== Reception ==
Lionel Seah of The Straits Times wrote that while the show is an "ingenious idea to feature over 90 artistes", but criticised the "bad" acting, "funereal" writing, "cartoon-like and two-dimensional" characters, "bogus" plots and "sad" jokes.

Yeoh Wee Teck of The New Paper wrote that the performances "punctured any hope that The Hotel was going to be a series of high calibre."
