= Angel's Dream =

- 真相
- Genre: Mystery / Thriller
- Written by: Ang Eng Tee
- Directed by: Zheng Bi Zhu
- Starring: Ivy Lee; Terence Cao; Huang Biren; Apple Hong; Robin Leong; Michelle Chong; Richard Low
- Opening theme: Truth (真相) by Jim Lim (林倛玉)
- Country of origin: Singapore
- Original language: Mandarin
- No. of episodes: 15

Production
- Producer: Kok Len Shoong
- Running time: approx. 46 minutes per episode

Original release
- Network: TCS-8
- Release: 30 August 2000

Angel's Dream (Chinese: 真相) is a 15-episode Singaporean Mandarin drama television series aired on MediaCorp TV Channel 8 in 2000. The drama series revolves around a murder case and stars Ivy Lee, Terence Cao, Huang Biren and Apple Hong. It was the Best Drama Serial of the year and won Ivy Lee the Best Actress award at the Star Awards 2000. It is produced by MediaCorp's acclaimed producer, Kok Len Shoong.

== Plot ==
Anqi was imprisoned for manslaughter. The victim was her husband Zi Wen. There were doubts as to whether she indeed killed him. The usual suspects - her long-time good friend Ye Ning who had a child with Zi Wen, Shi Sheng who was Anqi's partner in an illicit affair and the father of Anqi's daughter, a cop who wanted to kill Anqi.

The actual solution is completely unexpected.

== Cast ==
- Ivy Lee as Chen Anqi
- Terence Cao
- Huang Biren
- Apple Hong
- Robin Leong
- Michelle Chong
- Richard Low

== Accolades ==
Organisation	Year	Award	Nominee	Result	Ref.
Star Awards	2000	Best Actress	Ivy Lee	Won	
Star Awards	2000	Best Supporting Actress	Huang Biren	Nominated	
Star Awards	2000	Best Drama Serial	—N/a	Nominated	
