= Rayson Tan =

Singaporean actor (born 1965)

- Born: 12 January 1965 (age 61); Singapore
- Occupation: Actor
- Years active: 1990−present
- Employer: Mediacorp
- Agent: The Celebrity Agency (1990-2024)
- Spouse: Chen Liping (m. 1998)
- Children: 1
- Awards: Full list

Chinese name
- Simplified Chinese: 陈泰铭
- Traditional Chinese: 陳泰銘
- Hanyu Pinyin: Chén Tàimíng

Rayson Tan Tai Ming (born 12 January 1965) is a Singaporean actor.

== Career ==
Before joining MediaCorp, Tan worked as a flight attendant with Singapore Airlines. In 1990, he emerged as the 2nd Runner-Up in Singapore's Star Search Singapore talent competition. He has worked on many different roles and hosted many TV programmes, including the role of Singaporean war hero Lim Bo Seng in the 1997 WWII drama series The Price of Peace and the host for PSC Night in 2006.

In 1997, Tan was first nominated for the Top 10 Most Popular Male Artistes in the annual Star Awards and won it. He was also been nominated multiple times in the annual Star Awards, particularly for the "Best Supporting Actor" award category. He also appeared in the long-form drama, Life Less Ordinary.

On 10 October 2024, Tan announced his end of contract with Mediacorp and would be a freelance actor.

== Personal life ==
Tan married fellow MediaCorp actress Chen Liping in 1998. They have a son named Xavier, who was born in 2002. In 2008, Tan and his wife embraced Christianity.

=== Slim 10 saga ===
In 2003, Tan was sued by fellow actor Andrea De Cruz in the Slim 10 pills saga. De Cruz began her court battle against the importers and distributors of diet pills that she says nearly caused her to die of liver failure. De Cruz was seeking damages for injuries she alleged were caused by the drug and to cover the cost of her liver transplant surgery and treatment against the pill's against Health Biz, the importer and distributor of Slim 10 diet pills and also Tan, who sold the pills to her. Tan was later cleared while the distributors were forced to compensate her. He was acquitted of the charges in the lawsuit.

== Filmography ==
=== Television series ===
Year	Title	Role	Notes	Ref.
1991	Behind Bars (铁狱雷霆)	Zhenfei’s colleague	Cameo	
1991	Golden Shenton Way (金色珊顿道)	Fang Shunhua		
1991	The Woman I Marry (家有恶妻)	Raymond Wang Zhilong		
1991	Home Sweet Home (宜家宜乐)			
1992	Ladies In Action (霹雳红唇)	Shuai Jiamming		
1992	My Buddies (浪漫战场)	Tan Qiang		
1992	Mystery II (迷离夜II之不死咒)	Wang Liyang		
1992	Mystery II (迷离夜II之魔鬼魔鬼我爱你)	Jiang Hua		
1993	Angel of Vengeance (暴雨狂花)	Prosecutor	Cameo	
1993	Reaching For The Stars (银海惊涛)	Qiu Wenlong		
1993	The Invincible Warriors (皇朝铁将金粉情)	Duo Ling Ying Ming		
1993	The Invincible Warriors (皇朝铁将金粉情)	Ouyang Ming		
1993	Web of Deceit (鹤啸九天)	Mu Rong Tian Feng		
1994	The Valiant On (昆仑奴)	Shi Chaoyi		
1994	Truly Yours (聪明糊涂心)	Hu Shaofeng		
1995	Heavenly Ghostcatcher (天师钟馗之杨贵妃)	Tang Xuanzong		
1995	Heavenly Ghostcatcher (天师钟馗之江山美人)	Emperor Zheng De		
1995	King Of Hades (阎罗传奇)	King of Hades		
1995	Tales Of The Third Kind (第三类剧场)	He Zicong		
1996	Ah Xue (阿雪)	Li Weiguang		
1996	A Different Life (妈姐情缘)	Zhou Qi'an		
1996	River Of Love (风雨柴船头)	Jiang Zhonghan		
1997	Courting Trouble (婚姻法庭)	Ye Jie		
1997	Crimes And Tribulations (狮城奇案录之第一个上绞台的女人)	Yuan Tianhong		
1997	The Price Of Peace	Lim Bo Seng		
1997	Roses, Complete With Thorns (单身女郎)	Huang Wenli		
1998	Men At The Crossroad (四个好涩的男人)	Zhong Yongyi		
1998	Dreams (七个梦之不道德的梦)	Fang Lixing		
1998	My Teacher, Aiyoyo! (哎哟哟奇妙假期)	Huang Chaoren		
1998	Act 235 (刑事235)	Ni Jun		
1998	Riding The Storm (陌生人)	Wa Nahan		
1999	From The Medical Files 2 (医生档案II之边缘回望)	Deng Dasi		
1999	Lost Souls (另类佳人)	Li Chaoran		
1999	Lost Souls (另类佳人)	A-gui		
1999	Hero of the Times	Zhu Lingce		
2000	The Tax File (流金岁月)	Gao Tianlang		
2000	The Legendary Swordsman	Liu Zhengfeng		
2001	Master Swordsman Lu Xiaofeng 2	Hua Manlou		
2001	Three Women And A Half	Ken Lim		
2001	Don't Worry, Be Happy VI (敢敢做个开心人VI)	Zou Runfa	Guest appearance	
2001	The Hotel	Chen Yiming	Guest appearance	
2002	Katong Miss Oh (加东Miss Oh)	Pity Bug		
2002	No Problem (考试家族)	Bao Jinlu		
2003	Love Is Beautiful (美丽家庭)	Huang Leguan		
2003	Romance De Amour	Wu Qipeng		
2004	Double Happiness	Huang Yaozu		
2004	Double Happiness II (喜临门II)	Huang Yaozu		
2004	Timeless Gift (遗情未了)	Zhong Ziliang		
2005	Beyond The Axis of Truth II (法医X挡案II之致命吸引力)	Simon Li Zijian		
2006	The Undisclosed	CK Chong		
2006	A Million Treasures	Hong Dehua		
2007	Happily Ever After	Dong Huagong	Cameo	
2007	The Homecoming	Chen Hanyuan		
2008	Just in Singapore	Jian Hui		
2008	Love Blossoms	Kang Qingxiong		
2008	Love Blossoms II	Kang Qingxiong		
2009	Housewives' Holiday	Bryan He		
2010	Unriddle	Andrew Kwan		
2010	The Family Court	Shen Yi'an		
2011	C.L.I.F.	Yu Zhongnan		
2011	On the Fringe 2011	Yao Guohua		
2011	A Song to Remember	Black Snake		
2012	Double Bonus	Liu Daqi		
2012	Joys of Life	Yamaguchi		
2012	It Takes Two	Zhang Yang		
2012	Beyond	Chen Dayu	Cameo	
2013	I'm In Charge	Director Yang		
2013	The Recruit Diaries (阿兵新传)	Old Ah Ber	Cameo	
2014	Entangled (日落洞)	Luo Dongfa		
2014	In The Name of Love	Lu Zhiguang		
2014	Mystic Whispers (听)	Luo Yongzhong		
2015	Good Luck	Fang Youda		
2015	Second Chance (流氓律师)	Peter Qiu		
2015	Tiger Mum	Ivan Eng		
2015	Super Senior	Chen Guotai		
2015	The Dream Makers II	Richard Ma		
2016	Life - Fear Not	Zhuang Daoqiang		
2017	Home Truly	Peng Dayu		
2017	Dream Coder	Li Junheng		
2017	Legal Eagles	Gu Tianlin		
2017	Eat Already? 3	Towkay Wang		
2017	Life Less Ordinary	Wu Dazhi		
2018	Reach For The Skies	Tang Weiye		
2018	A Million Dollar Dream	Zhou Yuzhe		
2018	VIC	Ai Momo	Cameo	
2018	Say Cheese	Zhong Kelin		
2018	29th February (229 明天见)	Xie Guangming		
2018	Heart To Heart (心点心)	Liang Gui		
2019	Its Time (阴错阳差 — 时辰到)	Patrick		
2019	All Is Well - Singapore (你那边怎样，我这边OK)	Peter		
2019	C.L.I.F. 5	Wang Shitong		
2020	Happy Prince (快乐王子)	Zhang Haoxiang		
2020	Super Dad (男神不败)	Xu Yinghao		
2021	My Star Bride	Zhang Daqian		
2021	The Take Down (肃战肃绝)	Zhang Yi		
2021	Leave No Soul Behind (21点灵)	Serial Number 379		
2022	My Star Bride - Hi, Mai Phương Thảo	Zhang Daqian		
2022	The Unbreakable Bond (寄生)	Frankie		
2022	Healing Heroes (医生不是神)	Lim Fuquan		
2022	Dark Angel (黑天使)	Lin Kaisen		
2022	Soul Doctor (灵医)	Serial Number 379		
2023	Mr Zhou's Ghost Stories@Job Haunting II	Fortune-teller An		
2023	Shero	Mr Yue Feihong		
2023	The Sky is Still Blue			
2023	Till the End	Xie Weiye		
2025	Emerald Hill - The Little Nyonya Story (小娘惹之翡翠山)	Zhang Qiye	Cameo	

=== Film ===
Year	Title	Role	Ref.
2011	The Ultimate Winner	Zheng Youyi	
2022	Deleted	Officer Su	

== Awards and nominations ==
Year	Ceremony	Category	Nominated work	Result	Ref.
1997	Star Awards	Top 10 Most Popular Male Artistes	—N/a	Won	
1998	Star Awards	Top 10 Most Popular Male Artistes	—N/a	Nominated	
2000	Star Awards	Top 10 Most Popular Male Artistes	—N/a	Nominated	
2001	Star Awards	Top 10 Most Popular Male Artistes	—N/a	Nominated	
2001	Star Awards	Best Supporting Actor	Three Women and A Half (as Ken)	Nominated	
2003	Star Awards	Top 10 Most Popular Male Artistes	—N/a	Nominated	
2006	Star Awards	Best Supporting Actor	The Undisclosed (as Chong)	Nominated	
2007	Star Awards	Top 10 Most Memorable Villains	The Homecoming	Won	
2012	Star Awards	Best Supporting Actor	A Song to Remember (as Black Snake)	Nominated	
2012	Star Awards	Top 10 Most Popular Male Artistes	—N/a	Nominated	
2013	Star Awards	Best Supporting Actor	It Takes Two (as Zhang Yang)	Nominated	
2014	Asian Television Awards	Best Actor in a Supporting Role	Entangled (as Luo Dongfa)	Won	
2017	Star Awards	Best Evergreen Artiste Award	Life - Fear Not (as Zhuang Daoqiang)	Nominated	
2019	Star Awards	Top 10 Most Popular Male Artistes	—N/a	Nominated	
2021	Star Awards	Top 10 Most Popular Male Artistes	—N/a	Nominated	
2022	Star Awards	Top 10 Most Popular Male Artistes	—N/a	Nominated	
2023	Star Awards	Top 10 Most Popular Male Artistes	—N/a	Nominated	
2024	Star Awards	Top 10 Most Popular Male Artistes	—N/a	Nominated	
