= Star Awards 1999 =

Singaporean television awards

- Date: 19 December 1999
- Location: Caldecott Broadcast Centre, Singapore
- Hosted by: Timothy Chao; Yvette Tsui

Highlights
- Best Drama Serial: Stepping Out
- Best Actor: Xie Shaoguang for Stepping Out
- Best Actress: Cynthia Koh for Stepping Out

Television/radio coverage
- Network: Television Corporation of Singapore Channel 8
- Produced by: Lin Peiqin; Wen Shusen
- Directed by: Li Yiwen

Star Awards 1999 is the sixth edition of the annual Star Awards presented by the Television Corporation of Singapore to honour its artistes who work on Channel 8.

== Winners and nominees ==
Winners are listed first and highlighted in boldface.

=== Technical categories ===
| Top Rated Drama Serial | Top Rated Primetime Variety |
|---|---|
| **From the Medical Files II** (24%; est. 800,000 viewers) | **Comedy Nite** (20%; est. 666,000 viewers) |
| Best Director | Best Screenplay |
| **Paul Yuen − Out to Win** | **Jiang Ning and Guo Yunwen − Out to Win** |
| Best Variety Producer | Best Variety Research Writer |
| **Lin Peiqin − MCS All-Stars Charity**; **Wu Yonghua − Star Search 1999 Show 1** | **Ye Dingji − Travel Hunt - Israel** |

=== Main ceremony ===
Winners and nominees:

Special Achievement Award
| **Jack Neo** | |
| Best Drama Serial | Best Primetime Variety |
| **Stepping Out**; From the Medical Files II; Wok of Life; Legend of the Eight Immortals; Out to Win | **City Beat**; Battle of the Best; Comedy Night; Juedui Xingwen; Travel Hunt |
| Best Variety Special | Best Theme Song |
| **NKF 6th Anniversary Charity Show**; Star Search 1999 Show 1; Star Search 1999 Show 2; Lunar New Year's Eve Special 1999; MCS All-Stars Charity | **"Wo Chi De Qi Ku** 我吃得起苦**" (from Stepping Out);** **Performed by: Power Station**; "Wok of Life 福满人间" (from Wok of Life); Performed by: Ann Kok; "LUV 3" (from Out to Win); Performed by: Fann Wong; "Xiao Yao You 逍遥游" (from Legend of the Eight Immortals); Performed by: Wu Jiaming; "Pian Pian Ru Meng 翩翩入梦" (from Lost Soul); Performed by: Zoe Tay |
| Best Actor | Best Actress |
| **Xie Shaoguang − Stepping Out as Zhang Jiafu**; Terence Cao — Stepping Out as Chen Xia; Chew Chor Meng — Wok of Life as You Ri-an; Christopher Lee — Riding the Storm as Zhong Qingtang; Richard Low — Mr OK as Zhang A-tu | **Cynthia Koh − Stepping Out as Hong Dou**; Huang Biren — From the Courtroom as Yang Zhanyi; Ivy Lee — Stepping Out as Ju; Zoe Tay — Lost Soul as Pianpian; Fann Wong — Out to Win as Zhang Wenhua Coco |
| Best Supporting Actor | Best Supporting Actress |
| **Tay Ping Hui − Stepping Out as Liu Mei**; Chunyu Shanshan — Stepping Out as Lin Baotian; Brandon Wong — Wok of Life as Wang Xia; Zheng Geping — Wok of Life as Huang Xiaodong; Zhu Houren — Wok of Life as Zeng Nanhua | **Yang Libing − Wok of Life as Zeng Haolian**; Chen Huihui — Stepping Out as Danniang; Yvonne Lim — Stepping Out as Haiyan; Florence Tan — Wok of Life as Ma Daixiang; Tracer Wong — Out to Win as Wang Ailian |
| Most Popular Newcomer | Best Variety Show Host |
| **Nick Shen − My Grandpa as Fang Zhenhua**; Apple Hong — P.I. Blues as Chen Anqi; Carol Tham — My Grandpa as Xiaona; Samantha Toh — P.I. Blues as Deng Jiali; ~~Ericia Lee~~ (Note: Lee was removed from nomination as she was a part-timer and not on contract with Mediacorp.) | **Kym Ng − City Beat**; Sharon Au — City Beat; Guo Liang — Liangchu Zhenxiang; Diana Ser — Juedui Xingwen; Wang Yanqing — Yanqing Youyue |
| Best Comedy Performer | |
| **Mark Lee − Comedy Night**; Sharon Au — Right Frequency II as Cheng Meiguang; Huang Wenyong — Don't Worry, Be Happy 4 as Huang Jinlai; Jack Neo — Comedy Night; Kym Ng — Different Cuts Different Strokes as Lin Feng | |
| Most Popular Drama Serial in Taiwan | Most Popular Male Artiste in Taiwan |
| **Wok of Life**; Legend of the Eight Immortals; Tofu Street; Out to Win; Lost Soul | **Chew Chor Meng**; Christopher Lee; Rayson Tan; Li Nanxing; Xie Shaoguang |
| Most Popular Female Artiste in Taiwan | |
| **Jacelyn Tay**; Fann Wong; Phyllis Quek; Zoe Tay; Ann Kok | |
| Top 10 Most Popular Male Artistes | Top 10 Most Popular Female Artistes |
| **Chew Chor Meng**; **Xie Shaoguang**; **Guo Liang**; **James Lye**; **Li Nanxing**; **Jack Neo**; **Mark Lee**; **Terence Cao**; **Thomas Ong**; **Bryan Wong**; Kenneth Tsang; Vincent Ng; Christopher Lee; Zhu Houren; Darren Lim; Huang Bingjie; Huang Wenyong; Tay Ping Hui; Henry Thia; Jerry Chang | **Kym Ng**; **Chen Liping**; **Fann Wong**; **Zoe Tay**; **Ann Kok**; **Evelyn Tan**; **Huang Biren**; **Ivy Lee**; **Sharon Au**; **Michelle Chia**; Diana Ser; Yvonne Lim; Jacelyn Tay; Xiang Yun; Lin Meijiao; Wang Yanqing; Koh Chieng Mun; Patricia Mok; Cynthia Koh; Phyllis Quek |
