= Evelyn Tan =

Singaporean actress (born 1974)

- Born: 7 October 1974 (age 51)
- Other name: Chen Yuyun
- Education: Chung Cheng High School (Main); Temasek Junior College
- Alma mater: National University of Singapore
- Occupations: Actress; host; singer; educator
- Years active: 1997–present
- Spouse: Darren Lim
- Children: 4
- Awards: Star Awards 1998 : Best Newcomer; Star Awards 1998 – Star Awards 1999 : Top 10 Most Popular Female Artistes
- Musical career
- Genres: Mandopop
- Instrument: Vocals
- Label: Hype Records

Chinese name
- Traditional Chinese: 陳毓芸
- Simplified Chinese: 陈毓芸
- Hanyu Pinyin: Chén Yùyún

Evelyn Tan Yuit Yin (born 7 October 1974) is a Singaporean actress, host, educator and former singer.

Tan was ranked by local media as the 'Fifth Ah Jie' for being the fifth most prominent actress in Singapore's Chinese-language entertainment industry of that time after Zoe Tay, Fann Wong, Ann Kok and Phyllis Quek. She was prominently a full-time Mediacorp artiste from 1997 to 2005.

== Early life ==
Tan studied at Chung Cheng High School (Main) and Temasek Junior College and graduated from the National University of Singapore with a degree in mathematics.

== Career ==
Tan joined Star Search Singapore in 1997 after university and was offered a contract by Television Corporation of Singapore (TCS) after making the top 20. The following year, she won the Most Popular Newcomer poll at the Star Awards 1998.

In 1998, Tan was signed by Hype Records, the third TCS artiste signed up by the company after Fann Wong and Zoe Tay.

In 1999, Tan and Dreamz FM, a local band, performed the song "Together" (心连心), the National Day theme song, at the 1999 Singapore National Day Parade.

In September 2000, Tan joined the newly formed SPH MediaWorks and diversified into hosting, presenting and newsreading. When it merged with MediaCorp in 2005, she was transferred to MediaWorks' parent company but subsequently resigned for family reasons.

== Personal life ==
Tan met fellow artiste Darren Lim in 1998, during the TV remake of Beauty World for the President's Star Charity Show, with Tan as the protagonist and Lim as her love interest. Tan and Lim subsequently dated and married on 27 March 2004. The couple has four children.

== Filmography ==
=== Television series ===
| Year | Title | Role | Notes | Ref. |
|---|---|---|---|---|
| 1997 | A Place To Call Home | He Yiwen | | |
| 1998 | Tuition Fever | Kong Jiajia | | |
| 1998 | From the Medical Files | Yu Jia | Episode 10 | |
| 1998 | Return of the Condor Heroes | Lu Wushuang | | |
| 1998 | My Teacher, Aiyoyo! | Zhou Yuyun | | |
| 1998 | Growing Up | Poh Choo | Season 3 | |
| 1999 | Wok of Life | Ang Mo Kio / Zhenzhen | | |
| 2000 | My Home Affairs | Miyuki Nakayama | | |
| 2024 | Moments | Gu Chuntian | | |

=== Film ===
| Year | Title | Role | Notes | Ref. |
|---|---|---|---|---|
| 1999 | Liang Po Po: The Movie | | Cameo | |
| 2006 | Love Story | Librarian | | |

== Theatre ==
- Beauty World (1998)

== Discography ==
=== Studio albums ===
| Year | Title | Details | Sales | Ref |
|---|---|---|---|---|
| 1998 | Eve | Released: Label: Hype Records; Format: | 18,000 | |

=== Singles ===
| Year | Song title | Notes |
|---|---|---|
| 1998 | "Understanding" | Season of Love ending theme |

== Awards and nominations ==
| Organisation | Year | Category | Nominated work | Result | Ref |
|---|---|---|---|---|---|
| Star Awards | 1998 | Most Popular Newcomer | —N/a | Won | |
| Star Awards | 1998 | Top 10 Most Popular Female Artistes | —N/a | Won | |
| Star Awards | 1999 | Top 10 Most Popular Female Artistes | —N/a | Won | |
| Star Awards | 2024 | Top 10 Most Popular Female Artistes | —N/a | Nominated | |
| Star Awards | 2025 | Top 10 Most Popular Female Artistes | —N/a | Nominated | |
