= Viva Le Famille =

Drama serial

- 好儿好女
- Genre: Family
- Starring: Chen Shucheng; Zheng Geping; Huang Biren; Chen Hanwei; Richard Low; Lin Meijiao
- Opening theme: Part 1: 不要轻易松手 by Wang Minhui; Part 2: 身边的你 by Cavin Soh
- Country of origin: Singapore
- Original language: Chinese

Production
- Running time: approx. 45 minutes per episode

Original release
- Network: MediaCorp Channel 8
- Release: 2002 – 2003

Vive La Famille (Chinese: 好儿好女) is a Mediacorp TV Channel 8 Singapore Chinese drama serial that revolves around a big family that faces many problems which other Singaporean families may also face, such as expenses on giving birth to a child, staying with their in-laws, etc. There are 2 parts of the show and were aired in 2002 and 2003 respectively. The cast for Part 1 includes mostly veteran actors such as Chen Shucheng, Chen Hanwei, Huang Biren, Zheng Geping, Lin Meijiao, Chen Huihui, Yao Wenlong, Richard Low and Li Yinzhu.

Due to the popularity of the series, a sitcom spin-off-cum-sequel A Toast of Love was produced and aired in October 2003. It stars original cast members Richard Low, Hong Huifang, Lin Meijiao and Chen Huihui in their original roles as well as Dasmond Koh, Rui En and other artistes as guest stars.

== Story (Vive La Famille I) ==
The Sun family is headed by retiree, Sun Yong Shun (Chen Shucheng) who brought up his four children on his own when his wife died twenty years ago. Other Sun members include his eldest son, Yu Guo (Zheng Geping) and his wife (Lin Meijiao) who are obsessed with pursuing money and material gains that they neglect their only son. Second son, Yu Tai (Yao Wenlong) has a wife (Chen Huihui) who is more capable than him. Third daughter (Huang Biren) is a successful career woman who prefers to remain single. And youngest son, Yu An (Gary Yap) took up a filmmaking course on the pretext that he is pursuing his MBA in U.S.

== Story (Vive La Famillie II) ==
A continuation from part I, Vive La Famille II showcases an original cast with 2 new additions, namely Pan Jinlian (Hong Huifang) as Thomas' (Chen Hanwei) auntie who hails from Penang and Stephanie (Cassandra See) as Stella's (Lin Meijiao) sister.

Long-time widower Sun Yongshun (Chen Shucheng) suffers a stroke and his four children decide to employ a maid to manage the household chores, while his sister-in-law Sixuan (Li Yinzhu) offers to take care of Yongshun. In this season, everyone is plagued by their own problems and the household fails to enjoy a moment of peace.

Second son and wife Huifen (Chen Huihui) decide that Yutai (Yao Wenlong) will quit his job to be a househusband when Huifen's career soars. The pressure the couple faces by reversing traditional roles soon takes a toil on them. The Sun family's life is turned upside down when third daughter's (Huang Biren) aunt-in-law, Jinglian (Hong Huifang), from Penang moves in to live them. Jinglian assumes the role of the matriarch in her attempt to help, frustrating every Sun family member.

Meanwhile, eldest son Yuguo (Zheng Geping) and his wife (Lin Meijiao) have to reconcile the fact that the latter is retrenched. In addition, Yuguo's boss tries to seduce him and to bribe his family by offering to buy over the house to help tie over the bad times. Will the Sun family be able to tide over their troubles?

== Cast ==
- Chen Shucheng - Sun Yongshun, head of the family
- Huang Biren - Sun Yumin, only daughter
- Chen Hanwei - Thomas, Yumin's husband
- Hong Huifang - Pan Jin Lian, Thomas aunt
- Zheng Geping - Sun Yuguo, the oldest son
- Lin Meijiao - Stella, Yuguo's wife
- Cassandra See - Stephanie, Stella’s sister
- Yao Wenlong - Sun Yutai, second son
- Chen Huihui - Huifen, Yutai's wife
- Gary Yap - Sun Yu An, youngest son
- Joey Ng - Xiaoqi, Yu An’s girlfriend
- Jin Yinji - Xiaoqi’s mother
- Richard Low - Sun Yongfa, Yongshun's younger brother
- Li Yinzhu - Zeng Shi Xuan, Yongshun’s sister-in-law
- Tracer Wong - Xiuling, Yuguo's boss

== Accolades ==
=== 2002 Accolades ===
Award	Nominee	Result
Best Actor 最佳男主角	Chen Shucheng 陈澍城	Nominated
Best Supporting Actor 最佳男配角	Yao Wenlong 姚彣隆	Nominated
Best Drama Serial 最佳电视剧	—N/a	Nominated
Best Theme Song 最佳主题曲	Wang Min Hui 王敏惠 — 《不要轻易松手》	Nominated

=== 2003 Accolades ===
Award	Nominee	Result
Best Supporting Actress 最佳女配角	Hong Huifang 洪慧芳	Nominated
Best Theme Song 最佳主题曲	Cavin Soh 苏梽诚 —《身边的你》	Nominated
