= 2000 AD (film) =

2000 Hong Kong-Singaporean film by Gordon Chan

- Film poster
- Directed by: Gordon Chan
- Screenplay by: Gordon Chan; Stu Zicherman
- Story by: Gordon Chan; Stu Zicherman
- Produced by: John Chong; Solon So; David Leong
- Starring: Aaron Kwok; Daniel Wu; Phyllis Quek; James Lye
- Cinematography: Arthur Wong
- Edited by: Chan Ki-hop
- Music by: Shigeru Umebayashi
- Production companies: Media Asia Films; Raintree Pictures; People's Productions
- Distributed by: Media Asia Distributions (HK); United International Pictures (Singapore)
- Release date: 3 February 2000
- Running time: 109 minutes
- Countries: Hong Kong; Singapore
- Languages: Cantonese; Mandarin; English
- Box office: HK$13.7 million (HK)

2000 AD (Chinese: 公元2000) is a 2000 action thriller film directed by Gordon Chan, who also wrote the screenplay with Stu Zicherman. The film stars Aaron Kwok, Phyllis Quek, James Lye and Daniel Wu. A Hong Kong-Singaporean co-production, the film was shot on location in both Hong Kong and Singapore. The film was released theatrically in Hong Kong on 3 February 2000. It was timed to screen during the peak Chinese New Year period.

== Plot ==
A private plane belonging to the TDX company is shot down over Singapore by a rogue agent from the CIA, Kelvin Woo. The company president was coming to investigate a stolen computer protection system. Woo has a programmer, Alex, plant a bug in the 1st National Bank's computer system, but he still needs a "Caller Program" to wipe the systems before they can rob the bank.

Colonel Ng, head of the Army's Information Warfare Unit, recruits Major Eric Ong from the Singapore Police to investigate the plane shooting independently from the US authorities. Ong is sent to Hong Kong to quietly observe. In Hong Kong, brothers Peter and Greg Li, who are programmers, live with Peter's girlfriend Janet and her brother Bobby. Greg's girlfriend, Salina, informs him that her office was raided by the CIA and the Hong Kong Police Force Government Security Unit subsequently raids Greg's home. Ronald Ng of the Government Security Unit leads the search with Woo and another CIA agent. During the search, an emp bomb is triggered, disabling all the electronics in the house. The brothers are arrested, and an American diplomat interrogates Greg while Ng listens in. Greg is a CIA agent and asked for help from the embassy. He suspects the CIA has been compromised and that TDX may be implicated. Woo finds Greg's computer was wiped clean by the emp bomb. Peter is released, but Greg is to be deported back to the States.

Leaving the embassy, the car transporting Greg was hit by a rocket. Greg and his escorts are all killed. Peter and Ng chase the assailant with Peter reaching the attacker first. Woo then arrives and is about to shoot Peter when PTU officers show up. He then pretends to help Peter while the assailant escapes. Woo offers his help and gives Peter his number.

As Peter drives home with Janet, he notices Ong following them behind. Peter confronted Ong and Ong reveals he is a Singaporean agent and asks Peter to help him investigate his brother's death. When Peter gets home, he finds that the house is swarming with police as part of the investigation. An officer breaks a large vase, spilling coins all over the floor. Salina arrives with her friend, a judge, who prevents further searching. A key to Greg's safe deposit box is found among the coins and Salina advises Peter to check the contents immediately. Peter poses as Greg with Salina's help and retrieves a metal briefcase from the safe deposit box. Stepping outside the bank, both are arrested by Ng.

While being driven away, the GSU vehicles are attacked. Ng was mortally injured and warns Peter about Salina. Salina opens the briefcase and finds a safe deposit box key for the Singapore National Bank. Peter decides to go to Singapore with Salina, despite Ong's objections. Ong tells Colonel Ng he believes the GSU were attacked by Woo, while confirming Peter's innocence and his suspicions about Salina. Colonel Ng is upset about his involvement in the gun battle and demands he returns to Singapore.

In Singapore, Peter locks the key in the hotel room's safe, distrusting Salina with her becoming colder. They have a confrontation over dinner and Peter demands to know her identity. However, Salina tearfully reveals her thieving skills are from being a hostess in a night club, where she met Greg. In the following morning, Peter found Salina and the key missing. The others rush to the bank, where they see Salina leaving the bank, accompanied by the man Peter recognises as the assailant who killed his brother. The two leave in a car while the others rush out to get help from some nearby policemen. Frustrated, Peter steals the police car while Bobby stops the policeman, who calls for backup. Ong hears the radio message and rushes to the scene where Peter chases the car to the Boat Quay, where he rams it. Ong and three other officers intercept the sniper's car and have a gun battle. A speedboat is hijacked and all three, including Salina, escape up the Singapore River. Ong tells Peter and his friends that they need to go back to Hong Kong and Ong asks Peter not to reveal his identity.

The contents of the safe are shown to Woo, but it only contains items of sentimental value to Salina. Disgusted, he reminds her that she belongs to him, she was the one who stole the Caller Program. He threatens to kill her, erasing all evidence. At the airport, Bobby finds a mysterious program implanted on his laptop. Alex successfully completes the Caller Program, and destroys the data for several organisations, including the Stock Exchange and National Bank, their intended target. Woo is upset that the second part will take a month to finish.

Woo gets a call from Peter, who tells him about the program in Bobby's laptop and asks for his assistance. Peter demands information on Salina and his brother's assailant. Woo asks to move elsewhere to explain and pointed a gun in Peter's back while leaving. Ong, who had disguised himself as a waiter, pursues them and eventually fights Woo on the hotel roof. The assailant pins Ong down with sniper fire from another rooftop. As they fight for the laptop, Peter falls off the roof, but is saved by a gondola on the side of the hotel. Woo escapes with the laptop but was seen by Bobby who tails him.

Woo and two agents arrive at Suntec City, where they meet Salina and four others. Bobby informs Peter where they are but was captured by them later. Peter and several officers arrive at the Convention Centre, but Ong receives a call from Colonel Ng, who surprises him by asking him to arrest all the American agents. He has confirmation that they are operating without approval. The agents find Alex at his computer where he reports he completed his task. Woo shoots him and is about to shoot Bobby when Salina points her gun at Woo. As the other agents react, one of them, who was sympathetic towards Salina, stops them. Salina and Bobby leave with the laptop. Ong and his men cover the exits to the Convention Centre while Salina and Bobby hide among the exhibits. The rouge CIA agents hunt for them. Bobby tells Peter their location and they rush in to help. Woo sees the officers and Peter converging on Bobby's hideout and find both Bobby and Salina. In a struggle, Bobby is shot by Woo. Ong manages to gun down several CIA agents while Woo escapes with the laptop with some civilians hostage. Woo forces them to run the software and then shoots a hostage, forcing the police to withdraw. Peter rushes Woo and is shot. Woo started the program's deletion process but it shows a snapshot of Peter and Bobby instead, a hoax they planted instead of the program. Peter then try to shoot Woo but failed as the gun malfunctions. Peter is treated by paramedics outside the Convention Centre while the assailant walks away from the crowd. Salina compliments Bobby for his bravery while on the way to the hospital.

== Cast ==
- Aaron Kwok as Peter Li
- Daniel Wu as Bobby
- Phyllis Quek as Salina
- James Lye as Eric Ong, a Singaporean Special Agent
- Gigi Choi as Janet
- Andrew Lin as Kelvin Woo, a rogue CIA Agent
- Ray Lui as Greg Li
- Francis Ng as Ronald Ng, a Hong Kong Police Force Government Security Unit leader
- Ken Lo as assailant
- Cynthia Koh as Theresa
- Kwan Yung as CIA hitman
- Cheung Wai as Mike
- Thomas Hudak as U.S. diplomat
- Wong Dik-gei as CIA hitman

== Awards ==
Organisation	Year	Category	Recipient(s)	Results	Ref.
Hong Kong Film Awards	29 April 2001	Best Supporting Actor	Francis Ng	Won	
Hong Kong Film Critics Society Awards	2000	Best Actor	Francis Ng	Won	
Golden Bauhinia Awards	2001	Supporting Actor	Francis Ng	Won	
