= The Vagrant (TV series) =

- 豹子胆
- Written by: Ang Eng Tee 洪荣狄
- Directed by: Fang Jiafu 方家福
- Starring: Li Nanxing; Huang Biren; Zheng Geping; Yvonne Lim
- Opening theme: 好人难做 by Benny Wong, sung by Tay Ping Hui
- Ending theme: 无名 by Benny Wong, sung by Li Nanxing
- Country of origin: Singapore
- Original language: Chinese
- No. of episodes: 20

Production
- Producer: Winnie Wong 王尤红
- Running time: approx. 45 minutes

Original release
- Network: MediaCorp Channel 8
- Release: April 2002

Related
- On the Fringe (2011)

The Vagrant (Chinese: 豹子胆) is a 2002 Chinese drama. It was produced by Mediacorp, a television station in Singapore. The cast includes veteran actors Li Nanxing, Huang Biren and Huang Yiliang as well as new artistes Zhang Yaodong, Le Yao and Zzen Zhang. The Vagrant was the second highest rated drama serial in 2002, after Beautiful Connection which coincidentally also starred Huang Bi Ren.

== Story ==
The first episode begins with the introduction of Ah Bao, who narrates his story. Abandoned by his own parents as a child, Ah Bao (Li Nanxing) grew up with gangsters and often got into trouble. At the age of 21, Ah Bao went to jail after his friend (Zheng Geping) and girlfriend (Joey Swee) betrayed him during a robbery he took part in. While in jail, Ah Bao plotted his revenge against the people who betrayed him.

Upon his release from prison, he discovered that his friend is now intellectually disabled and that his friend's ex-girlfriend has remarried. He learns that the couple has left behind children, who are abused by their foster family. Feeling sorry for them, Ah Bao decides to take care of the children.

Ah Bao ends up renting a place from Shushu (Huang Biren), a chicken rice seller, who is infamous for her weird temper. Living under the same roof, Ah Bao learns that Shushu's temperament is due to her husband's (Huang Yiliang) betrayal when she had breast cancer. As time goes by, the couple discovers the nicer side of each other and Ah Bao learns about trust again.

Just when life seems to be turning better for Ah Bao, he discovers the truth about his downfall ten years ago. He decides to uncover the mastermind. Is Ah Bao taking a wrong step in his life again?

== Cast ==
=== Main cast ===
- Li Nanxing as Ah Bao/ Liu Xiaoming
- Huang Biren as Gan Shushu

=== Supporting cast ===
- Zheng Geping as Ah Lang
- Huang Yiliang as Huang Jinlang
- Huang Shinan as Du Wei (David)
- Joey Swee as Cecilia
- Ang Ching Hui as Ke-ai
- Fraser Tiong as Kele
- Tracer Wong as Mao Nana
- Yao Wenlong as Lin Dehua
- Zhang Yaodong as Gan Yuan
- Le Yao as Yang Xiaomin
- Yvonne Lim as Song Xintian
- Zen Chong as Zhang Disheng
- Li Wenhai
- Hu Wensui

== Accolades ==
Year	Ceremony	Category	Nominee	Result
2002	Star Awards	Young Talent Award	Ang Ching Hui	Nominated
2002	Star Awards	Best Actor	Li Nanxing	Won
2002	Star Awards	Best Supporting Actor	Huang Yiliang	Won
2002	Star Awards	Best Supporting Actress	Tracer Wong	Nominated
2002	Star Awards	Best Drama Serial	—N/a	Nominated
2002	Star Awards	Best Screenplay 最佳剧本	Ang Eng Tee	Won
2002	Star Awards	Best Sound Design 最佳音乐与音效设计	Chen Weichang & Leong Mei Han	Won
