= The Tree (2001 film) =

2001 film by Daisy Chan

- Film poster
- Traditional Chinese: 孩子·樹
- Simplified Chinese: 孩子·树
- Literal meaning: Kid, Tree
- Hanyu Pinyin: Háizǐ Shù
- Directed by: Daisy Chan
- Screenplay by: Victor Lau; Ho Hee-ann; Liew Kwee-lan
- Produced by: Victor Lau
- Starring: Francis Ng; Zoe Tay; Phyllis Quek; Deng Mao Hui
- Cinematography: Tung Sei-kwong
- Edited by: Koh Kah-yen
- Music by: Jim Lim; Kevin Quah
- Production company: Mediacorp Raintree Pictures
- Release date: April 26, 2001
- Running time: 98 minutes
- Country: Singapore
- Language: Mandarin

The Tree is a 2001 Singaporean supernatural-mystery drama film directed by Daisy Chan, starring Zoe Tay, Francis Ng, Phyllis Quek, Tse Kwan Ho and Deng Mao Hui. Produced by Mediacorp Raintree Pictures, the film was shot entirely in Singapore over 28 days with a production budget of S$1.1 million. It was released in Singapore cinemas on 26 April 2001.

== Plot ==
Lin Zixiong dies after being hit by a car, and the only witness seems to be his stepson "Popiah", a quiet young boy with no friends besides a gigantic tree. Police investigator Jiang Liangxing becomes convinced the driver was Lin's wife Guo Meifen, whose first husband Xie Wenguang disappeared 5 years ago. Meanwhile, Jiang's boyfriend and pathologist Wu Chongzhe discovers a mysterious fungus in Lin's heart. He also befriends Popiah and learns that Lin had sexually abused him. Perhaps the answer to everything lies in the gigantic tree...

== Cast ==
- Deng Maohui as Xie Qingyu, a child nicknamed "Popiah"
- Zoe Tay as Guo Meifeng, Popiah's mother
- Francis Ng as Wu Chongzhe, a forensic pathologist
- Phyllis Quek as Jiang Liangxing, Wu Chongzhe's girlfriend and a police superintendent
- Lau Siu-ming as Wu Mingwei, Wu Chongzhe's father
- Tse Kwan-ho as Xie Wenguang, Popiah's father
- Zheng Geping as Lin Zixiong, Popiah's stepfather
- Dasmond Koh as Chen Guoqiang, a police officer

== Reception ==
Soh Yun-Huei gave the film 1/2 out of 4 stars, writing the film meant to blend "suspense, melodrama and romance together, but the end results are lumpy and unsatisfying".
