= Deborah Sim =

Singaporean actress (born 1979)

- Born: 24 September 1979 (age 45); Singapore
- Other names: Shen Yiling
- Education: Nanyang Academy of Fine Arts
- Occupations: Actress; model; businesswoman
- Years active: 1997–present
- Height: 1.63 m (5 ft 4 in)

Chinese name
- Traditional Chinese: 沈依靈
- Simplified Chinese: 沈依灵
- Hanyu Pinyin: Shěn Yīlíng

Deborah Sim (born 24 September 1979) is a Singaporean former actress and model, best known for her appearance on Star Search, as well as for starring in the television series Legend of the Eight Immortals, Stand by Me and The Return of the Condor Heroes.

== Education ==
Before joining Star Search, Sim attended Nanyang Academy of Fine Arts and studied interior design.

== Career ==
A 1997 Star Search finalist, Sim made her acting debut in the sitcom My Big Brother (1997), alongside Chen Shucheng, Cassandra See and fellow Star Search semi-finalist Constance Song.

Sim subsequently starred in the popular mythological drama Legend of the Eight Immortals where she played the role of Lan Caihe. She also played supporting roles in Stand by Me and The Return of the Condor Heroes.

Sim left Television Corporation of Singapore (TCS) after her contract ended in April 2000. The same year, she signed a five-year contract with Andy Lau's production company New Melody to expand her career into the Hong Kong and Taiwan entertainment industries. She terminated her contract two years later and returned to Singapore, citing the lack of acting opportunities. Shortly thereafter, Sim started singing in pubs.

At one point, Sim was a partner in a floral concierge service and shop called Pints Of Petals. She had also co-founded a noodle eatery with actor Benjamin Heng.

== Personal life ==
In 2021, it was reported that Sim was working as an oil broker.

In 2024, Sim came out publicly on Dear Straight People, becoming the first Singaporean actress to come out publicly.

== Filmography ==
Sim has appeared in the following programs and films:

=== Film ===
- The Truth About Jane and Sam (1999)
- Blessed Destiny (2003)
- The Source of Love (2003)
- A Roar of Wolf Troops (2016)

=== Television series ===
- My Big Brother (1997)
- Legend of the Eight Immortals (1998)
- Stand by Me (1998)
- The Return of the Condor Heroes (1998)
- My Teacher, My Friend (1999)
- The Ride Home (1999)
- The Tax Files (2000)
- The Voices Within (2000)
- Taiji Prodigy (2001)
- My Love My Home (2003)
- Heal and be Healed (2004)

== Awards and nominations ==
Year	Award	Category	Nominated work	Result	Ref
1997	Star Awards	Most Popular Newcomer	—	Nominated	
