= Autumn in March =

- Directed by: Huang Yiliang
- Written by: Chui Chi Kin; Ting Soo Yun
- Story by: Huang Yiliang; Sun Lin; Yu Tong
- Produced by: Huang Yiliang
- Starring: Sheila Sim; Phyllis Quek; Nat Ho; Bernard Tan
- Cinematography: Alan Yap; Lim Chin Leong
- Edited by: Yim Mum Chong; Gu Yi; Huang Yiliang
- Music by: Mo Juli
- Distributed by: Red Group Film
- Release date: 8 September 2009
- Running time: 87 minutes
- Country: Singapore
- Languages: Mandarin; Hokkien; English
- Budget: S$1,000,000

Autumn in March (Chinese: 午夜烟花; pinyin: Wǔyè Yānhuā; Pe̍h-ōe-jī: Ngó͘-iā-ian-hoa) is a Singaporean film written and directed by Huang Yiliang, and produced by Red Group Film. It stars Sheila Sim, Phyllis Quek, Nat Ho and Bernard Tan and co-stars Huang Yiliang and Joey Swee.

== Plot ==
Xinjie (Sheila Sim) is a mysterious girl who lives on her own in a big bungalow house. No one knows much about the girl except that she is leasing out rooms to strangers at an incredibly cheap rate turning away many prospective renters who believe that the house is haunted. Xinjie rented out 3 of her rooms at $200 per month each, and the only condition is that she wants her roommates to have breakfast with her every morning and dinner for at least 3 times a week.

Her criteria for rental also leaves some with little doubt that the girl has mental problems. After a long search for tenants, she finally decides to rent out her place to an ex convict with a history of domestic violence (Bernard Tan), an older lady who is on the run from loan sharks (Phyllis Quek) and a young aspiring pianist who has fled from home after a dispute with his father (Nat Ho).

As their lives start to intertwine, Xinjie's horrific past starts to unravel as well accumulating to a climax of an ending that leaves everyone stumped.

== Cast ==
- Sheila Sim as Xinjie
- Phyllis Quek as Lee Siqin
- Nat Ho
- Bernard Tan
- Huang Yiliang
- Joey Swee

== Production ==
Autumn in March is Huang Yiliang's first produced film. Filming had taken place for the $1million budget film in September 2008 and planned to be released by first quarter 2009 in cinemas. However, the film was released in DVD instead, on 8 September 2009.
