= Out to Win (TV series) =

- Country of origin: Singapore
- Original language: Mandarin Chinese
- No. of episodes: 10

Production
- Production location: Singapore
- Running time: 45 minutes

Original release
- Network: Mediacorp Channel 8
- Release: 8 August 1999

Out to Win (步步为赢) is a television serial set in modern-day Singapore. Produced by MediaCorp TV Channel 8, it starred Fann Wong in drama about a self-centred futures trader who gradually alienates her friends and family by doing whatever it takes to rise up the corporate ladder. It is only through a car crash that she learns to empathise with the victim and learns the meaning of life.

== Cast ==
- Fann Wong - Coco Zhang Wenhua
- Ix Shen - Lin Zhengdong
- Lynn Poh - Chen Xiaoyan
- Lin Yisheng - Li Ziqiang
- Tracer Wong - Irene Wong
- Sean Say - He Ziyang

== Accolades ==
Organisation	Year	Award	Nominee	Result	Ref
Star Awards	1999	Best Drama Serial	—N/a	Nominated	
Star Awards	1999	Best Actress	Fann Wong	Nominated	
Star Awards	1999	Best Supporting Actress	Tracer Wong	Nominated	
