= Wok of Life =

Singaporean TV series

- 福满人间
- Genre: Comedic Drama
- Starring: Chew Chor Meng; Ann Kok; Evelyn Tan; Richard Low; Jin Yinji; Zhu Houren; Zheng Geping
- Opening theme: 福满人间 sung by Ann Kok
- Country of origin: Singapore
- Original language: Chinese
- No. of episodes: 50

Production
- Running time: approx. 45 minutes per episode

Original release
- Network: Television Corporation of Singapore Eighth Frequency (now Mediacorp Channel 8)

Wok Of Life (Chinese: 福满人间) is a long-running Chinese drama which aired in Singapore in 1999. The show starred Chew Chor Meng, Ann Kok, and Evelyn Tan as the main characters.

== Cast ==
- Chew Chor Meng - You Yongfu (Swimming Trunks)/You Ri-an (1960s and 1990s)
- Evelyn Tan - Ang Mo Kio/Zhenzhen (1960s and 1990s)
- Ann Kok - Saiman, Yue-e (1960s)
- Florence Tan - Ma Daixiang (1960s)
- Yang Libing - Zeng Haolian (1960s)
- Richard Low - Huang Dadi (1960s)
- Zheng Geping - Huang Xiaodong (1960s and 1990s)
- Li Yinzhu - Ka-sou (1960s)
- Chen Meiguang - Ka-sou (1990s)
- Brandon Wong as Wang Xia (1960s)
- Ye Shipin- Mr Four-Eye (1960s)
- Xiang Yun - Margaret (Ma Daixiang) (1990s)
- Jason Oh - Zeng Nanhua (1960s)
- Zhu Houren - Zeng Nanhua(1990s)

== Synopsis ==
Ri-an, an apprentice cook, turns up at Hua Da Hotel to answer an advertisement for the job of a cook. He keeps the matter from his teacher, Nanhua. To Ri-an's disappointment, the panel of interviewers do not like the way he cooks the dish. Nanhua, the resident chef of Fu Man Lou, sets very high standards for his staff. They respect and fear him at the same time.

Ri-an meets an American-trained chef, Yaoqing, and is impressed with his culinary skills. Ri-an offers to take him on an eating spree around the country. Yaoqing is hounded by the press at the seafood restaurant and decides to go back to Ri-an's place. Nanhua is upset as Ri-an has misplaced Yue-e's photo. When Ri-an learns that Yue-er is coming back to Singapore, he arranges for Nanhua to pick her up.

Yaoqing's pepper crab proves to be more popular with the restaurant patrons than Nanhua's stewed duck. Nanhua is peeved. The mentally slow Wu Jin gets cheated by dishonest customers when he sells lottery tickets. His mother, Ka-sou, who has worked at Fu Man Lou for many decades, blames it on Yue-er's incompetence when she helped to deliver Wu Jin decades ago. Yaoqing demands that Nanhua cook the dish, 万佛朝宗. Ridden with thoughts of the past, Nanhua passes out and is sent to the hospital. As he enters the ambulance, he tries to tell Ri-an something.

Ri-an mistakenly thinks that Nanhua wants him to take his place in the contest. He loses to Yaoqing and, feeling utterly ashamed of himself, he contemplates leaving home. Nanhua tells Yue-e and Daixiang that he deserves retribution for what he did to Yaoqing's family. In the meantime, Ri-an buys Toto, which has a $3 million lottery prize, in the hope of winning back Fu Man Lou with a lawsuit. Yaoqing arrives to claim Fu Man Lou and in a scuffle over an urn in Fu Man Lou, Ri-an and Zhenzhen are transported back to the ‘60s after the urn topples and falls on them.

Ri-an thinks he has died and gone to another dimension. Soon after, Ri-an realizes he is back in the ’60s and is recognised as Yongfu. He is eager to return to the ‘90s as he wants to claim the prize money he won in Toto. He meets his grand-teacher, Dadi, who runs a restaurant named Fu Man Lou. Dadi had four students, his son Xiaodong, Nanhua, Yongfu and Ah Xi. Dadi is bewildered when Ri-an does not recognise him and his peers. Ri-an is confused when Dadi and his family addresses him as You Yongfu. He discovers that a man named You Yongfu works at Fu Man Lou, and has an uncanny resemblance to himself. Yongfu had escaped to Malacca after he thought he killed someone.

Ri-an finds himself falling in love with a woman called Saiman. Yongfu and Saiman were once lovers, but had fallen out with each other after it was revealed that Yongfu, who was a playboy, had 107 other girlfriends. Daixiang arrives to stay with her father, Mr. Four-eyes after having flunked out of school without anyone knowing. Ri-an is shocked to see that she is a younger version of his own mother. At the same time, the 4th pupil of Dadi, Ah Xi comes back from Malacca, having briefly met Daixiang on the train. He was betrothed to Xiao Ping, who is Dadi's daughter before Dadi got married in Singapore. Xiao Ping arrives in Singapore to seek her father, and strains Dadi's familial relations. She initially rejects Ah Xi due to his slow speech and apparent lack of knowledge but they become more intimate over the years.

Zhenzhen, who arrived with Ri-an, suffers from amnesia due to blows to her head during the scuffle in the '90s. She is found by Nanhua's sister, Haolian. Zhenzhen becomes known as Ang Mo Kio as she could only remember that she lived in the housing estate, Ang Mo Kio. She also falls in love with Nanhua, but Nanhua only treats her as a younger sister. She ends up working for Haolian, who is a midwife. However, as Zhenzhen is afraid of blood, Saiman becomes Haolian's assistant due to the lucrative business. Eventually, due to Saiman's inexperience, she caused Ka-sou's son, Wu Jing to be mentally handicapped. This adds to Saiman's family problems as they are poor due to her father's gambling habits. Her father eventually causes the death of Ka-sou's husband and flees.

Haolian was initially smitten with Wang Xia, but accidentally shares a night with a drunk Xiaodong who was smitten with Daixiang. Haolian, thinking she was pregnant due to a misunderstanding, marries into Xiaodong's family. It is later found out by the family that she wasn't pregnant but the situation was brushed off by Dadi. Haolian eventually manages to win Xiaodong's heart and gets pregnant after three years.

In the meantime, Saiman is encouraged by Nanhua of her abilities and decides to study to be a nurse, along with Zhenzhen and Xiao Ping. Ang Mo Kio and Ri-an spend the next three years in the '60s. In this 3 years, Ri-an and his fellow disciples learn cooking under Dadi who has decided to teach them properly. Initially embarrassed with her name, Saiman later realizes her birth name is Feng Yue'er, and decides to start using her birth name. On a house visit to a family which Yue'er and Nanhua helped, Yue'er gets impregnated with Yaoqing. However, due to a misunderstanding on Nanhua's part, people are mistaken for the baby to be Ri-an/Yongfu's. In a fit of anger that Nanhua doesn't trust her, Yue'er lies to Nanhua that the baby isn't his. Three months later, Haolian goes into labour. Yue'er tries to help but gets kicked by Haolian, and both fall unconscious. Both of them give birth to their respective babies, but Haolian's baby got strangled by his own placenta. Being overwhelmed by this news, Haolian takes Yue'er's baby as her own. Ka-sou, who was the one who found both of unconscious, agrees to Haolian's ploy as she was in desperate need for money for Wu Jing's surgery. Yue'er is devastated, thinking her child died. She reveals the truth to Nanhua and their relations are strained further.

Xiaodong eventually finds out that their child, Yaoqing is Yue'er's. He ends up missing Yaoqing's one-month-old celebration drinking at his real son's grave. He gets thrown out of the house by Dadi and accrues a gambling debt of $30,000. He plans for himself to be kidnapped, but Dadi is kidnapped instead during the struggle. The kidnappers demand a ransom of $200,000. Xiaodong angrily finds his conspirators over the increase over the said amount and gets kidnapped too. To pay off the ransom that was raised to $300,000, Dadi's wife sells Fu Man Lou. The kidnappers do not keep their side of the bargain, but Xiaodong manages to escape with Dadi. Xiaodong regrets all his actions when he realizes Fu Man Lou was sold off; however, he keeps mum about his initial involvement. Dadi finds out about Xiaodong's involvement and throws him out once again. Nanhua manages to win back Fu Man Lou through a cooking competition by cooking the dish, 万佛朝宗. An impressed Dadi considers letting Nanhua manage Fu Man Lou. Dadi realizes the truth behind Yaoqing and later dies in a fit of anger. He tries to reveal the truth to Nanhua about Yaoqing but is misunderstood. Xiaodong tries to show his capability by clinching a huge contract, but it ends up being a fraud. Xiaodong and Haolian eventually accuse Nanhua that the contract was a ploy of his to take over control of Fu Man Lou.

In the meantime, Zhenzhen (who has recovered her memory) and Daixiang become a popular singer duo with the help of Wang Xia and Yen Feng. Zhenzhen finds Yongfu in Malacca and rejects his advances and end up locking him up with Daixiang. Ri-an rushes to Malacca and tells Yongfu that he is his future son, but the latter thinks he is his half-brother. Daixiang manages to catch an escaping Yongfu and they spend the next few months together. Back in Singapore, Daixiang returns pregnant and threatens to commit suicide unless ‘Yongfu’ (Ri-an) marries her. Yongfu also returns but in the midst of escaping suffers a concussion and follows a monk. Ri-an is left to marry Daixiang. Zhenzhen suspects Daixiang's unborn baby is Ri-an, and Ri-an from the ‘90s shudders at the thought. They also realize that there would be a huge fire on 9 September, the day Ri-an would be born. In attempting to prevent the fire, Ri-an stays in Fu Man Lou on his wedding day to watch the stove. Xiaodong arrives angrily and accuses Nanhua of his underhanded ploy. In their scuffle, they start a fire. As Daixiang starts undergoing contractions, Ri-an starts suffering from a headache. Zhenzhen rushes to inform Ri-an and they get caught in the fire. Just as Daixiang gives birth to her baby, Ri-an and Zhenzhen finds themselves back to the ‘90s, as two Ri-an's cannot exist at the same time.

Nanhua thinks that You Yongfu (Ri-an) and Ang Mo Kio (Zhenzhen) died inside the fire and feels guilty over it. Yue'er eventually leaves for her studies in UK. Xiaodong is ashamed and leaves with Haolian and Yaoqing to Vietnam. Dadi's wife loses her mind after the multiple deaths and losses. She is taken away by Xiao Ping and Ah Xi, where they open a branch in Malacca.

Back in the 1990s, Nanhua is shocked to learn that Yaoqing is his son. Ri-an finally verifies that Daixiang is his mother. He is unable to accept the loss of the Toto ticket despite being ticked off by Zhenzhen. Yaoqing refuses to acknowledge the fact that Nanhua is his father despite being told the truth by Xiaodong over the phone. In their scuffle, he causes Nanhua to be hospitalised in the intensive care unit and is arrested. Nanhua finally regains consciousness and leaves the running of the restaurant to Ri-an since Ri-an appears more mature from his experience in the '60s. Ri-an decides to set up a retro-themed Fu Man Lou. Ah Xi's daughter, Yuan Yuan arrives to help too. Yaoqing acknowledges Nanhua as they find the Toto ticket in a cement mound that has been there for 30 years. Ri-an ends up tearing it as he muses over the development of Fu Man Lou. Eventually, Dadi's three disciples, Xiaodong, Nanhua and Ah Xi reunite at Fu Man Lou. They bring news to Nanhua that the real You Yongfu has become a monk.

== Trivia ==
- Two characters in the show exist in real-life, one being Wang Xia and the other being Julie Yeh Feng.

== Awards and nominations ==
Organisation	Year	Award	Nominee	Result	Ref
Star Awards	1999	Best Supporting Actress	Yang Libing	Won	
Star Awards	1999	Best Supporting Actress	Florence Tan	Nominated	
Star Awards	1999	Best Actor	Chew Chor Meng	Nominated	
Star Awards	1999	Best Supporting Actor	Brandon Wong	Nominated	
Star Awards	1999	Best Supporting Actor	Zhu Houren	Nominated	
Star Awards	1999	Best Drama Serial	—N/a	Nominated	
Star Awards	1999	Best Theme Song	"福满人间" by Ann Kok	Nominated	
