= A Toast of Love =

- 吃吃面包谈谈情
- Genre: Dramedy
- Directed by: 陈木成
- Starring: Richard Low; Hong Huifang; Lin Meijiao; Chen Huihui; Rui En; Dasmond Koh; Chen Tianwen; Nick Shen
- Country of origin: Singapore
- Original language: Chinese

Production
- Running time: approx. 30 minutes per episode

Original release
- Network: MediaCorp Channel 8
- Release: October 2003

A Toast of Love (吃吃面包谈谈情) is a Singaporean Chinese sitcom which aired in October 2003. It is a spin-off of the popular drama series Viva Le Famille. It was aired every Saturday at 9pm. There is no theme song used in the opening sequence.

== Cast ==
- Richard Low as Sun Yongfa
- Hong Huifang as Pan Jinglian (姑姑 "Aunty")
- Lin Meijiao as Stella (大喇叭 "Big Trumpet")
- Chen Huihui as Huang Huifen
- Rui En as Sun Yujia (Angela)
- Dasmond Koh as Yang Jierong
- Chen Tianwen as Wu Guanghui (Steven)
- Nick Shen as Pan Weiwen (David)

=== Guest cast ===
- Yao Wenlong as Sun Yutai
- Edmund Chen
- Priscelia Chan
- Jeff Wang
- Jaime Teo
- Michelle Liow
- Alan Tern
- Zen Chong
- Liu Qiulian

== Synopsis ==
Taxi driver Sun Yongfa stumbles upon Pan Jinglian's homemade kaya and discover that it is on par if not better than the ones sold in the market. He decides to open a bakery with her but things do not go as planned. Their children end up bickering with each other and get tangled with their own personal issues. Can Yongfa and Jinglian's business survive?

== Trivia ==
- Rui En's first drama collaboration with Dasmond Koh.
