= My One and Only (TV series) =

2023 Singaporean television series

- Promotional poster
- Chinese: 只此一家
- Literal meaning: "The one and only store / home"
- Hanyu Pinyin: Zhǐ cǐ yī jiā
- Genre: Drama
- Screenplay by: Zhong Jingyun
- Story by: Lim Gim Lan; Xu Liwen; Zhong Jingyun
- Directed by: Chen Jinxiang
- Starring: Zoe Tay; Brandon Wong; Shaun Chen; Elvin Ng; Ya Hui; Shawn Thia; Fang Rong; Zhai Siming
- Opening theme: "Qu Nuan" by Tay Kewei and Alfred Sim
- Ending theme: 1) "Scar" by Jarrell Huang; 2) "There's You and Me" by Desmond Ng; 3) "You Exist Everywhere" by Fang Rong
- Country of origin: Singapore
- Original language: Mandarin
- No. of seasons: 1
- No. of episodes: 130

Production
- Executive producer: Luo Wenwen
- Cinematography: Chen Hongjun; Huang Guozhong
- Editor: Lai Zhenjiang
- Running time: approx. 23 minutes
- Production company: Mediacorp

Original release
- Network: Channel 8
- Release: 27 July 2023 – 25 January 2024

My One and Only (Chinese: 只此一家) is a 2023 Singaporean long-form drama series starring Zoe Tay, Brandon Wong, Shaun Chen, Elvin Ng, Ya Hui, Shawn Thia, Fang Rong, and Zhai Siming. It premiered on 27 July 2023, and airs every weekday at 7.30pm on Mediacorp Channel 8.

== Cast ==
=== Main cast ===
- Zoe Tay as Ma Limin
- Brandon Wong as Hao Jian
- Shaun Chen as Andy Chua
- Elvin Ng as Wan Defu
- Ya Hui as Shen Baoyou
- Shawn Thia as Hao Renpin
- Fang Rong as Xiao Jingjing
- Zhai Siming as Ma Zhongyi
- Xiang Yun as Ma Huiling
- Yao Wenlong as Wan Zixiong
- Tay Ying as Leia Chong
- Zhang Yaodong as Lucas Low
- Phyllis Quek as He Yurou
- Chen Huihui as May Meizhen

=== Cameo appearances ===
- Zhang Jinhua as Mdm Ang
- Teo Ser Lee as Julie
- Darren Lim as Paul
- Yunis To as Xiaoqin
- Damien Teo as Xiao Tengfei
- Chen Shucheng as Yang Dongcheng
- Zhu Zeliang as Evan
- Hazelle Teo as Finn
- Zhang Xinxiang as Ang Shun
- Xavier Ong as Eton
- Adele Wong as Du Qiaojuan
- Adam Chen as Du Guoming
- Chiou Huey as Zola
- Hong Damu as Wang Biyan
- Jeffrey Xu as Liao Bowen

== Awards and nominations ==
Year	Ceremony	Category	Nominees	Result	Ref
2024	Star Awards	Best Theme Song	Alfred Sim and Tay Kewei	Nominated	
2024	Star Awards	MY PICK Most Hated Villain	Shaun Chen	Nominated	
2024	Star Awards	MY PICK Most Hated Villain	Chen Hui Hui	Nominated	
