= Chen Huihui =

Singaporean actress and businesswoman (born 1966)

- Born: 1 October 1966 (age 59); Singapore
- Occupations: Actress; host; businesswoman
- Years active: 1986−present
- Spouse: Unknown (m. 2004)
- Children: 1

Chinese name
- Traditional Chinese: 陳慧慧
- Simplified Chinese: 陈慧慧
- Hanyu Pinyin: Chén Huìhuì

Chen Huihui (born 1 October 1966) is a Singaporean actress, known for her supporting roles in various television series, including Tofu Street, Hainan Kopi Tales, The Guest People, The Wing of Desire, Moving On and Viva Le Famille, as well as for starring in the television series Perfect Women, Over the Horizons and A Toast of Love, a Viva Le Famillle spin-off. She won the Star Award for Best Supporting Actress for her performance in The Wing of Desire, and was nominated for the award five other times for her performances in Tofu Street, The Guest People, Stepping Out, Hainan Kopi Tales and Love Me, Love Me Not.

== Career ==
Chen joined Singapore Broadcasting Corporation in 1986 after joining a performance class.

In 2002, on her sixth nomination for the Best Supporting Actress at the Star Awards, Chen won the Best Supporting Actress award.

In 2003, Chen was offered to renew her contract with Mediacorp but with a pay cut. Rejecting the new contract terms, Chen left Mediacorp. Chen later joined SPH MediaWorks's Channel U after being invited by Man Shu Sum.

== Personal life ==
Chen married in September 2004. Her son was born on 29 September 2005.

In 2007, it was reported that Chen opened a beauty salon in a mall located near Ang Mo Kio MRT station.

In an interview in January 2022, Chen shared that she has been holding a full-time job at a wellness training centre.

== Filmography ==
Chen has appeared in the following programmes and films:

=== Television series ===
Year	Title	Role	Notes	Ref.
1987	Moving On			
1988	When Hearts Touch			
1988	Strange Encounters 2			
1989	A Mother's Love	Fang Ruiwen		
1989	Splash to Victory	Susanna		
1990	Wishing Well			
1991	Working Class			
1992	Fiery Passion			
1993	Happy Foes	Shi Qiuping		
1993	The Great Conspiracy	Tang Xiu		
1993	Smouldering Heat			
1994	Larceny Of Love			
1995	Chronicle of Life			
1995	Over the Horizons	Xu Li		
1995	The Teochew Family	Li Baohua		
1995	Thorny Love	Nurse	TV Movie	
1995	When A Child Is Born			
1996	My Destiny With You			
1996	Tofu Street	Auntie Wonton		
1996	Triad Justice			
1997	My Wife, Your Wife, Their Wives	Ma Shuxian		
1997	Playing To Win			
1997	The Guest People	Wu Jinyan		
1998	My Little Angels			
1999	From The Courtroom			
1999	My Grandpa			
1999	Stepping Out			
2000	The Voices Within			
2000	Four Walls and a Ceiling			
2000	Hainan Kopi Tales	Chen Xuezhen		
2000	Knotty Liaison			
2000	Dare to Strike			
2001	Love Me, Love Me Not	Zhang Xuelian		
2001	The Hotel	June Tay		
2001	The Stratagem	Wang Lizhu		
2002	The Wing of Desire			
2002	Viva Le Famille	Huang Huifen		
2003	A Child's Hope			
2003	A Toast of Love	Huang Huifen		
2003	Health Matters			
2003	Venture Against Time			
2004	Perfect Women			
2004	The Crime Hunters			
2004	The Seventh Month			
2005	Yummy Yummy			
2007	The Greatest Love of All	Chen Xinglin		
2008	Love Blossoms	Nancy		
2008	Just in Singapore	Ah Lian		
2009	Daddy at Home	Nancy		
2009–2010	Your Hand in Mine			
2010	Breakout	Miss Wong		
2011	Be Happy	Bao Zhu		
2011	Devotion	Hong Jinzhi		
2011	Ghetto Justice			
2012	It Takes Two	Zhang Xiuhua		
2013	The Dream Makers	Xu Meiqing		
2014	World at Your Feet	Chen Qifang		
2014	118	Huang Mei		
2015	The Journey: Our Homeland	Bai Jinnu		
2015	Crescendo	Yang Yiwei's Mother		
2015	Life - Fear Not	Xiu Yan		
2016	The Truth Seekers	Liang Meiyun		
2017	While We Are Young	Yu Feng		
2021	Key Witness			
2021	The Heartland Hero			
2021	Soul Doctor			
2023	Silent Walls			
2023	My One and Only	May		
2024	Kill Sera Sera			
2025	Emerald Hill - The Little Nyonya Story	Ying Jie		

=== Film ===
Year	Title	Role	Notes	Ref.
2003	Destiny			
2012	Dance Dance Dragon			
2014	Iceman	Mimi		

=== Variety show host ===
- Food Train 2 (2004)

=== Radio play ===
- Happiness 2530 (2006)

== Awards and nominations ==
Year	Award	Category	Nominated work	Result	Ref
1996	Star Awards	Best Supporting Actress	Tofu Street (as Auntie Wonton)	Nominated	
1998	Star Awards	Best Supporting Actress	The Guest People	Nominated	
1999	Star Awards	Best Supporting Actress	Stepping Out	Nominated	
2000	Star Awards	Best Supporting Actress	Hainan Kopi Tales (as Chen Xuezhen)	Nominated	
2001	Star Awards	Best Supporting Actress	Love Me, Love Me Not (as Zhang Xuelian)	Nominated	
2002	Star Awards	Best Supporting Actress	The Wing of Desire (as Hu Xiujuan)	Won	
2002	Star Awards	Top 10 Most Popular Female Artistes	—	Nominated	
2024	Star Awards	Most Hated Villain	My One And Only (as May)	Nominated	
