= My Ghost Partner =

- Directed by: Huang Yiliang
- Written by: Huang Yiliang
- Starring: Huang Yiliang; Brandon Wong; Dawn Yeoh
- Production company: Red Group Studio
- Release date: 30 August 2012
- Running time: 106 minutes
- Country: Singapore
- Languages: English; Mandarin

My Ghost Partner (Chinese: 人鬼拍挡), is a 2012 Singaporean comedy film directed by Huang Yiliang.

== Plot ==
Conmen Zhang Shi and Yi Fei are thrown into the sea after messing with the wrong guy. While Yi Fei survives, Zhang Shi drowns, and returns as a ghost.

== Cast ==
- Huang Yiliang as Zhang Shi
- Brandon Wong as Yi Fei
- Dawn Yeoh
- Richard Low
- Carole Lin
- Nick Shen
- Yang Libing
- Sam Tseng

== Release ==
The film was initially meant to be released in either April or May 2012. It was released in theatres in Singapore on 30 August 2012.

== Reception ==
Li Yiyun of Lianhe Zaobao rated the film two-and-a-half stars out of five for entertainment and two stars out of five for art. Kwok Kar Peng of The New Paper rated the film one-and-a-half stars out of five, praising the performances, while criticising the plot, calling it "old-fashioned", and described the ending as being a "terrible cliche". Boon Chan of The Straits Times rated the movie one-and-a-half stars out of five, writing "Fatal flaws aside, My Ghost Partner could have been a mildly amusing comedy if it had focused on Shi and Fei's partnership. But with multiple plotlines and a whole bunch of familiar small-screen faces including Dawn Yeoh, Nick Shen, Yang Libing, Carole Lin and even Taiwan's Sam Tseng, it feels too scattered."
