= Huang Yiliang =

Singaporean actor (born 1961)

- Born: Ng Aik Leong; 4 July 1961 (age 65); Singapore
- Occupations: Businessman; Actor; Film Director; Film Producer; Plumber
- Years active: 1985–2012
- Spouse: Lin Meijiao (m. 1991; div. 1997)
- Children: 2, including Chantalle Ng

Chinese name
- Traditional Chinese: 黄奕良
- Simplified Chinese: 黄奕良
- Hanyu Pinyin: Huáng Yìliáng

Huang Yiliang (born Ng Aik Leong; 4 July 1961) is a Singaporean former actor and film director and currently a businessman and plumber. He was a full-time Mediacorp artiste from 1985 to 2007, after which he decided not to renew his contract. Huang directed two movies released in 2009 and 2012, and since then has been running businesses in plumbing and seafood.

== Career ==
Prior to acting, Huang was a plumber in his father's company.

In 1985, Huang started as an actor with Mediacorp. He won the Best Supporting Actor Star Awards three times and was nominated thrice for the Top 10 Most Popular Male Artistes award during his 20-year career there. While acting, he also worked as an insurance agent and started a fish farm with friends. Huang left the TV industry in 2007.

Huang felt that it was time to move on to a different challenge after having acted for the past 20 years and started his own movie producing company Red Group Film. He became a film producer, a film director and a film actor.

Huang's first film, Autumn in March, was released on 8 September 2009 with a budget of S$1 million. It was originally scheduled for the big screen but was later downgraded to a DVD release after failing to get the support of the local movie distributors. However, it did receive overwhelming support from aspiring actresses, with more than 300 of them auditioning for the lead actress.

On 30 August 2012, Huang released his second film My Ghost Partner, which had a gross box office collection of S$24,833.

As of April 2026, Huang runs a plumbing company, a wet market stall selling fish and crab, and a seafood hawker food stall at the 79A Circuit Road Hawker Centre. He returned to acting in August.

== Personal life ==
=== Relationships ===
Huang married Singaporean actress Lin Meijiao in 1991 and had a daughter Chantalle Ng in 1995. They divorced in 1997 with Lin retaining custody of their daughter.

After Huang's divorce in 1997, he remarried and had a son with his second wife.

=== Legal issues ===
On 30 November 2020, Huang appeared in a court trial and was accused of attacking a Bangladeshi worker, Jahidul, with a metal scraper at the Singapore Islamic Hub in December 2018, having been charged on 29 November the previous year. The worker was an employee of HYL Enterprises, a plumbing company which was owned by Huang. During the trial, audio recordings revealed that Huang had frequent angry, verbal outbursts against Jahidul, causing the worker to live in fear while working for Huang. On 11 December 2018, Huang then had another violent outburst against Jahidul for not using enough string to tie a plastic bag over a rubbish pail, which eventually led to his attack on Jahidul with a metal scraper. In court, he claimed that he established an agreement with Jahidul to allow him to hit the worker "to help (him) improve at work", and that the assault was merely play-acting. However, the prosecutor dismissed the explanation as "ridiculous" and issued Huang a warning against contempt of court. On 22 January 2021, Huang was convicted of "voluntarily causing hurt by a dangerous weapon" to Jahidul. On 26 February 2021, the court found him guilty and he was sentenced to 10 months imprisonment. Huang filed an appeal to lower the sentence, but it was dismissed on 4 February 2022 and he began serving his sentence immediately.

In November 2024, Huang was fined and banned from driving for five years for striking a cyclist while driving a van.

On 10 May 2026, he was taken to the hospital after being assaulted at his hawker stall.

== Filmography ==
=== Film ===
Year	Title	Role	Notes	Ref
1994	The Blazing Trail (兰桂坊血案)		Telemovie	
1994	Love Dowry (爱情订金)	Chen Yaoxing	Telemovie	
1996	Legend of Da Bo Gong (大伯公传奇)	Da Bo Gong / Shi Ji	Telemovie	
1996	Ace Cops (妙警点38)	Wu Xifa	Telemovie	
1997	The Gods Must Be Rich (财神到)	Da Bo Gong	Telemovie	
2006	I Not Stupid Too	Mr. Lim		
2008	12 Lotus	Lianhua's father		
2009	Autumn in March		Directorial debut as film director	
2012	My Ghost Partner		Second and final film as film director	

=== Television series ===
Year	Title	Role	Notes	Ref
1986	The Happy Trio 青春123		Cameo Appearance	
1986	Under One Roof 家和万事兴	David		
1986	Crossroads 红绿灯 之《绿影》	A-Xiong 阿雄		
1986	The Bond 天涯同命鸟	He Xiao Nan 贺笑南		
1987	Paint a Rainbow 调色板	Lu Heng 陆恒		
1987	Painted Faces 戏班	Qian Tian Ding 钱添丁		
1987	I Do 君子好逑	Zhong Duo Gen 钟多根		
1988	Heiress 世纪情	Ding Zhuang Fei 丁壮飞		
1988	On the Fringe	Lin Zhen Yu 林振宇		
1988	The Golden Quest 金麒麟	Xu Yu Lang 许玉郎		
1988	Mystery 迷离夜 之《魂》	Wen Xue Pin 温学品		
1988	Strange Encounter 2 奇缘2 之《怨偶天成》	Qin Da Cheng /Cao Shi An 秦大诚 / 曹石安		
1989	The Fortune Hunters 钻石人生	Ding Wen Qiang 丁文强		
1989	The Sword Rules 剑断江湖	Yu Xiao Qiang 于小强		
1989	My Daughters' Three 芳华满一家	Huang Zhi Ming 黄志明		
1990	By My Side 逆风天使	Xie Tian Ci 谢天赐		
1991	Behind Bars 铁狱雷霆	Ke Tai Long 柯太龙		
1991	The Other Woman 醋劲100	Dr. Zhang 张医生		
1992	The Dating Game 爱情乒乓球	Li Fei Yang 李飞扬		
1992	Terms of Endearment 戏剧人生	Song Wen Le 宋文乐		
1993	Smouldering Heat 赤道谜情	Lv Jia Le 吕家乐		
1993	Battle of Justice 人海孤鸿	Ding Tai Shan 丁泰山		
1993	The Wilful Siblings 斗气姐妹	Bai Zhi Hua (Patrick) 白之华		
1994	Bond of Love 情网	Wang Shang Hua 王上华		
1994	The Young Ones 壮志骄阳	Lin Zhi Wei 林志伟		
1995	Neighbourhood Heroes 大英雄小人物	Chen Tian Cheng 陈天成		
1995	Deep Within My Heart 爱在心处	Chen Zhong 陈忠		
1995	It's My World 还我半边天	Zhou Jian Cheng 周健成		
1995	Lady Investigators 女探三人组	Lin A-Wen 林阿文		
1996	Beyond Dawn 女子监狱	Liang Wei Min 梁伟民		
1996	Tales of the Third Kind 2 第三类剧场2 之《幻海奇男》	Xia He Tian 夏赫天		
1996	Mirror of Life 实况剧场 之《三水红头巾》	Lin Guo Qiang 林国强		
1996	Brave New World 新阿郎	Gao Hong Fei 高鸿飞		
1997	My Wife, Your Wife, Their Wives 101老婆 之《问你爱妻有多深》	Luo Wen 罗文		
1997	Love in a Foreign City 富贵双城	Chen Zhi Qiang 陈志强		
1997	Tuition Fever 老师总是比我早	Kong Xiao Long 孔小龙		
1997	Immortal Love 不老传说	Liang Zhong Huan/Liang Ji Guang 梁仲欢\梁继光		
2001	My Genie Season 1 我爱精灵1	54088 I Am Your Father 我是你爸爸		
2002	My Genie Season 2 我爱精灵2	54088 I Am Your Father 我是你爸爸		
2002	The Vagrant	Huang Jinlang		
2002	Kopi-O II	Wen Juan 文隽		
2002	The Unbeatables 3 双天至尊III	Huang Yun Jiu 黄云九		
2003	A Child's Hope	Ding Cheng		
2003	Home In Toa Payoh	Yuan Guocheng		
2003	Holland V	Tian Dahua		
2004	When the Time Comes 一线之间	Wang Wen Hao 王文豪		
2004	Double Happiness	Lin Xue Zhi 林学智		
2004	Double Happiness II	Lin Xue Zhi 林学智		
2005	Beyond the aXis of Truth II	Wu Chengyu		
2006	Women of Times	Kuang Qicai		
2007	My Dear Kins 亲本家人	Zhang Yi Lai 张一来		
2007	The Greatest Love of All	Li Yingxiong		
2007	Metamorphosis	Red Hair Pig / Caucasian Pig 红毛猪	Cameo Appearance	
2007	The Golden Path	Su Ma		

== Awards and nominations ==
Ceremony	Year	Category	Nominated work	Result	Ref
Star Awards	1996	Best Actor	Ace Cops (as Wu Xifa)	Nominated	
Star Awards	1997	Best Supporting Actor	Brave New World (as Gao Hongfei)	Nominated	
Star Awards	1997	Top 10 Most Popular Male Artistes	—N/a	Nominated	
Star Awards	2001	Best Comedy Performer	My Genie	Nominated	
Star Awards	2001	Top 10 Most Popular Male Artistes	—N/a	Nominated	
Star Awards	2002	Best Supporting Actor	The Vagrant (as Huang Jinliang)	Won	
Star Awards	2003	Best Supporting Actor	Holland V (as Tian Dahua)	Won	
Star Awards	2003	Best Comedy Performer	My Genie II	Nominated	
Star Awards	2004	Top 10 Most Popular Male Artistes	—N/a	Nominated	
Star Awards	2006	Best Supporting Actor	Women of Times (as Kuang Qicai)	Won	
