= Stand by Me (TV series) =

- 家人有约
- Genre: Family drama
- Starring: Xie Shaoguang; Terence Cao; Huang Biren; May Phua; Deborah Sim; Chen Shucheng; Ding Lan
- Opening theme: Believe (相信) by Elsa Lin (林玉婷)
- Country of origin: Singapore
- Original language: Mandarin
- No. of episodes: 20

Production
- Producer: Kok Len Shoong
- Running time: approx. 46 minutes per episode

Original release
- Network: TCS Channel 8
- Release: April 1998

Stand by Me (Chinese: 家人有约) is a 1998 Singaporean Mandarin drama series which aired on MediaCorp TV Channel 8 (then known as TCS - Television Corporation of Singapore) in April 1998. The serial garnered favourable responses from the audience during its telecast with its touching and heart-rending storyline, and also with critically acclaimed acting from the cast.

At the 1998 Star Awards, the series won the Best Drama Serial award, while main cast Xie Shaoguang and Huang Biren also won the Best Actor and Best Actress awards respectively.

== Cast ==
- Xie Shaoguang as Du Hanmin (杜汉民), a former doctor later turned paraplegic
- Terence Cao as Du Hansan (杜汉生)
- Huang Biren
- May Phua
- Deborah Sim
- Chen Shucheng
- Ding Lan
- Joey Swee
- Raymond Yong as Ah Chung (阿中)

== Production ==
Kok Len Shoong (郭令送) is the producer of the drama.

== Reception ==
The series broke viewership records in 1998.

=== Accolades ===
Organisation	Year	Award	Nominee	Result	Ref.
Star Awards	1998	Best Actor	Terence Cao	Nominated	
Star Awards	1998	Best Actor	Xie Shaoguang	Won	
Star Awards	1998	Best Actress	Huang Biren	Won	
Star Awards	1998	Best Drama Serial	—N/a	Won	

Preceded by The Price of Peace; 1997	Star Awards for Best Drama Serial; Stand by Me; 1998	Succeeded by Stepping Out; 1999
