= Star Awards 1998 =

Singaporean television awards

Star Awards 1998 红星大奖1998
- Country: Singapore

Highlights
- Best Drama Serial: Stand by Me
- Best Variety Show: Comedy Nite 搞笑行动
- Best Actor: Xie Shaoguang
- Best Actress: Huang Biren
- Special Achievement Award: Zoe Tay

Television/radio coverage
- Network: TCS-8

Star Awards 1998 is the fifth edition of the annual Star Awards presented by the Television Corporation of Singapore to honour its artistes who work on Channel 8. The Best Comedy Performer and Best Variety Show Host Awards were introduced to recognise excellence in non-drama categories such as sitcoms, comedy shows and variety/infotainment shows.

The awards ceremony was delayed to 20 December 1998, as compared to early October in 1997.

== Winners and nominees ==
Winners are listed first, highlighted in boldface. Other nominees are arranged based on chronological order of actors' showcase videos on the ceremony itself.

Best Actor	Best Actress
**Xie Shaoguang − Stand by Me**; Christopher Lee - The Return of the Condor Heroes; Li Nanxing - The New Adventures of Wisely; Chew Chor Meng - Immortal Love 不老传说; Terence Cao - Stand by Me as Du Hansheng	**Huang Biren – Stand by Me**; Zheng Wanling 郑琬龄 – Driven by a Car 欲望街车; Zoe Tay – The New Adventures of Wisely; Fann Wong – The Return of the Condor Heroes; Lina Ng – Living in Geylang 芽笼芽笼
Best Supporting Actor	Best Supporting Actress
**Chen Guohua – Around People's Park** 珍珠街坊; Richard Low – Living in Geylang 芽笼芽笼; Lin Yisheng 林益盛 – The New Adventures of Wisely; Zheng Geping – The Return of the Condor Heroes; Chunyu Shanshan 淳于珊珊 – Rising Expectations 长河	**Xiang Yun – Around People's Park** 珍珠街坊; Chen Huihui – The Guest People; Hong Huifang – Facing the Music 钢琴88; Kym Ng – The New Adventures of Wisely; Yvonne Lim – The Return of the Condor Heroes

Best Drama Serial

- **Stand by Me**
  - Immortal Love 不老传说
  - Driven by a Car 欲望街车
  - The Return of the Condor Heroes
  - The New Adventures of Wisely

Best Variety Show Host

- **Kym Ng - City Beat** 城人杂志
  - Guo Liang 郭亮 - 异度空间
  - Sharon Au - 群星照亮千万心之新视艺人齐献力
  - Bryan Wong - City Beat 城人杂志
  - Wang Yanqing 王嬿青 - 嬿青有约

Best Comedy Performer

- **Mark Lee - Comedy Nite** 搞笑行动
  - Jack Neo - Comedy Nite 搞笑行动
  - Huang Wenyong - Don't Worry, Be Happy 敢敢做个开心人 III
  - Chew Chor Meng - Don't Worry, Be Happy 敢敢做个开心人 III
  - Tracer Wong 王裕香 - Don't Worry, Be Happy 敢敢做个开心人 III

Best Variety Show

- **Comedy Nite** 搞笑行动

=== Special awards ===
Special Achievement Award

- Zoe Tay

=== Popularity awards ===
Most Popular Newcomer

- **Evelyn Tan 陈毓芸 - A Place to Call Home 薯条汉堡青春豆**
  - Amanda Ho 何芸珊 - Starting Point 青春列车
  - Florence Tan 陈秀丽 - Immortal Love 不老传说
  - Joey Swee 徐绮 - The Test Of Time 三年零八个月
  - Michelle Liu 刘铃铃 - Starting Point 青春列车
  - Yvonne Lim 林湘萍 - Starting Point 青春列车
  - Andi Lim 林伟文 - Starting Point 青春列车
  - Huang Feixiang 黄飞翔 - The Test Of Time 三年零八个月
  - Henry Chong 钟应时 - Starting Point 青春列车
  - Jerry Chang 常鲁峰 - The New Adventures of Wisely 卫斯理传奇
  - Huang Guoliang 黄国良 - Starting Point 青春列车
  - Tay Ping Hui 郑斌辉 - On the Edge - Mr Personality 风度翩翩先生
  - Vincent Ng 翁清海 - Sword & Honour 铁血男儿
  - Sean Tang 陈思恩 - A Place to Call Home 薯条汉堡青春豆

=== Top 10 Most Popular Artiste ===
Top 10 Most Popular Male Artistes	Top 10 Most Popular Female Artistes
**Guo Liang**; **Christopher Lee**; **Terence Cao**; **Jack Neo**; **Mark Lee**; **Xie Shaoguang**; **Bryan Wong**; **Li Nanxing**; **Henry Thia**; **Chew Chor Meng**; Chen Tianwen; Zhu Houren; Peter Yu; Mak Ho Wai; Darren Lim; Huang Wenyong; Qin Wei 秦伟; Richard Low; Rayson Tan; Yao Wenlong	**Chen Liping**; **Phyllis Quek**; **Evelyn Tan**; **Zoe Tay**; **Fann Wong**; **Yvonne Lim**; **Ann Kok**; **Jacelyn Tay**; **Kym Ng**; **Pan Lingling**; Aileen Tan; Lina Ng; Amanda Ho 何芸珊; Wang Yanqing 王嬿青; Cynthia Koh; Xiang Yun; Sharon Au; Patricia Mok; Wendy Tseng 曾晓英; Irin Gan 颜丽秦

=== Taiwan polls ===
Most Popular Drama in Taiwan

- The Return of the Condor Heroes

Most Popular Female Artiste in Taiwan

- Fann Wong

Most Popular Male Artiste in Taiwan

- Christopher Lee
