= The Return of the Condor Heroes (Singaporean TV series) =

1998 Singaporean TV series

- Promotional poster
- 神雕侠侣
- Genre: Wuxia
- Based on: The Return of the Condor Heroes by Jin Yong
- Directed by: Cai Jingsheng; Huang Fenfei
- Starring: Christopher Lee; Fann Wong
- Opening theme: "Prophecy" (预言) up-beat version by Phil Chang and Fann Wong
- Ending theme: "Prophecy" (预言) slow version by Phil Chang and Fann Wong
- Country of origin: Singapore
- Original language: Mandarin
- No. of episodes: 40

Production
- Production location: Singapore
- Running time: ≈45 minutes per episode
- Production company: TCS

Original release
- Network: TCS Channel 8
- Release: 2 June – 27 July 1998

The Return of the Condor Heroes (神雕侠侣) is a Singaporean wuxia television series adapted from the novel of the same title by Jin Yong. It was broadcast from 2 June to 27 July 1998 on TCS Channel 8 in Singapore and was later released on other Asian television networks.

== Cast ==
- Christopher Lee as Yang Guo
  - Cai Yiwei as Yang Guo (child)
- Fann Wong as Xiaolongnü
- Zhu Houren as Guo Jing
- Shirley Ho as Huang Rong
- Florence Tan as Guo Fu
  - He Sixian as Guo Fu (child)
- Yvonne Lim as Guo Xiang
- Constance Song as Cheng Ying
  - Chen Xiaoqing as Cheng Ying (child)
- Evelyn Tan as Lu Wushuang
  - Zheng Xin'er as Lu Wushuang (child)
- Zheng Geping as Jinlun Fawang
- Pan Lingling as Li Mochou
- Chen Shucheng as Huang Yaoshi
- Yang Yue as Hong Qigong
- Richard Low as Ouyang Feng
- Liang Tian as Yideng
- Mak Hiu-wai as Zhou Botong
- Huang Shinan as Gongsun Zhi
- Deborah Sim as Gongsun Lü'e
- Zhu Xiufeng as Qiu Qianchi
- Li Nanxing as Lu Liding
- Zoe Tay as Lu Erniang
- Ix Shen as Huodu
- Yang Tianfu as Da'erba
- Yao Wenlong as Yelü Qi
- Joey Swee as Yelü Yan
- Lau Leng Leng as Wanyan Ping
- Andi Lim as Yin Zhiping
- Liang Weidong as Zhao Zhijing
- Ye Shipin as Qiu Qianren
- Yan Bingliang as Wu Santong
- Ding Lan as Wu Sanniang
- Huang Guoliang as Wu Xiuwen
  - Lin Bingjun as Wu Xiuwen (child)
- Thomas Ng as Wu Dunru
  - Wang Ruixian as Wu Dunru (child)
- Christie Wong as Shagu
- Chen Guohua as Lu Youjiao
- Aric Ho as Guo Polu
- Wu Kaishen as Kublai Khan
- Xu Meiluan as Hong Lingbo
- Zheng Wen as Xiaoxiangzi
- Zhong Shurong as Nimoxing
- Fu Youming as Zhu Ziliu
- Zhu Yuye as Yinggu
- Wang Guanlong as Feng Mofeng
- Li Haisheng as Qiu Chuji
- Yu Jialun as Hao Datong
- Lin Ruping as Sun Bu'er
- Chen Tianci as Ma Yu
- Guo Weiqiang as Wang Chuyi
- Zeng Sipei as Granny Sun
- Tang Hu as Ke Zhen'e
- Dai Peng as Fan Yiweng
- Yun Changcou as Big-headed Ghost

== Soundtrack ==
Return of the Condor Heroes (神雕侠侣)

Soundtrack album CD by Various
- Released: 2 June 1998
- Recorded: 2 June 1998
- Label: TCS
- Producer: TCS

1. "Fate Comes and Leaves (Prophecy)" (缘散缘聚 (预言)) by Phil Chang and Fann Wong
2. "Strange Encounter in the Ancient Tomb" (古墓奇缘)
3. "Separation on the Snowy Ridge" (雪岭离情)
4. "Passionless Valley" (绝情幽谷)
5. "Jade Maiden Sutra (Confessing Feelings)" (玉女心经 (示情)) by Fann Wong
6. "Inner Demons Like Blood" (心魔如血)
7. "Emotions Like Threads" (情怀如丝)
8. "Hair Has Turned White (Life is Too Short)" (两鬓如霜 (一生太短暂)) by Christopher Lee
9. "The Divine Condor as Companion" (神雕相伴)
10. "Dejected (Spiritual Connection)" (焚心化灰 (心灵相通)) by Chang Lufeng
11. "A Great Hero" (侠之大者)
12. "Beauty and Tears Like Pearls" (红颜珠泪) by Chen Yuyun
13. "Three Golden Needles" (三枚金针)
14. "Fate Comes and Leaves" (缘散缘聚) by Fann Wong and Phil Chang
15. "Heroic Couple's Immortal Trail" (侠侣仙踪)

== Accolades ==
Organisation	Year	Award	Nominee	Result	Ref.
Star Awards	1998	Best Actor	Christopher Lee	Nominated	
Star Awards	1998	Best Actress	Fann Wong	Nominated	
Star Awards	1998	Best Supporting Actress	Yvonne Lim	Nominated	
Star Awards	1998	Best Supporting Actor	Zheng Geping	Nominated	
Star Awards	1998	Best Drama Serial	—N/a	Nominated	
