= Women of Times =

- 至尊红颜
- Genre: Family
- Directed by: 李美凤
- Starring: Fann Wong; Edmund Chen; Chen Hanwei; Cheng Pei-pei; Huang Wenyong; Aileen Tan; Huang Yiliang
- Opening theme: 爱情路 sung by Wakin Chau
- Country of origin: Singapore
- Original language: Chinese
- No. of episodes: 30

Production
- Running time: approx. 45 minutes per episode

Original release
- Network: MediaCorp Channel 8
- Release: May 2006 – June 2006

Women of Times (Chinese: 至尊红颜) is a 30-episode Chinese drama telecast in Singapore in 2006.

== Plot ==
This series traces the ups and downs of the Jia empire, a family of restaurateurs controlling the highly profitable Jin Le chain of restaurants.

At its helm is the very capable matriarch, Old Mrs. Jia (Cheng Pei-pei), who has single-handedly steered the business to where it is today. Each member of the clan, though diverse in his or her character and motivations, keeps up with appearances in order to maintain the harmony on the surface. But it is only too soon that self-interest gets in the way and human weaknesses rears its ugly head.

== Cast ==
- Fann Wong as Marissa Wang Xiyi 王曦怡
- Edmund Chen as Justin Jia Zengtu 贾增土
- Chen Hanwei as Ding Hanzhe 丁瀚哲
- Cheng Pei-pei as Mrs. Jia-She Huijun 贾佘蕙君
- Huang Wenyong as Andrew Jia Zengmu 贾增木
- Lin Meijiao as Wang Guiying 王贵莺
- Aileen Tan as Cynthia Jia Zengyue 贾增悦
- Huang Yiliang as Kuang Qicai 邝奇才

=== Supporting and minor roles ===
- Paul Chong 张向晖 as Kuang Yuqi 邝玉其
- Julian Hee as Michael Jia Ruoqi 贾若其
- Felicia Chin as Ou Xiangyun 欧湘芸
- Jesseca Liu as Jia Wanqi 贾宛其
- Terence Cao as Du Zhongxian (Ryan) 杜仲贤
- Candyce Toh as Lin You'er 林悠儿
- Joey Swee as Wang Fengyi 王风仪
- Chen Shucheng as Chen Tianfa 陈添发
- Jimmy Nah as Hong Hai 洪海
- Eelyn Kok as Yabin 雅斌
- May Phua as Jessie
- Zen Chong as Bruce
- 潘煌盛 as Jia Yi 贾义

== Accolades ==
Year	Ceremony	Award	Nominee	Result	Ref
2006	Star Award	Best Actress	Fann Wong	Nominated	
2006	Star Award	Best Supporting Actor	Huang Yiliang	Won	
2006	Star Award	Best Supporting Actress	Felicia Chin	Nominated	

== Main character profile ==
- Jia-She Huijun (Cheng Pei-pei): Starting from scratch, Mrs. Jia has single-handedly brought the highly successful Jin Le chain of restaurants to where it is today. After suffering a heavy blow from her husband's death, she decides to retire from the business. Nonetheless, her conservative decision to let her incompetent sons take over the family business soon causes internal strife to arise.
- Jia Zengtu (in the Philippine airing: Justin Jia) (Edmund Chen): As the youngest descendant, Zengtu does show strong potential but is predictably pampered and overly self-indulgent. A marriage to Xiyi (Fann Wong) is arranged to ensure his swift rise through the company's ranks but it only served to make him more complacent. His selfish pursuit of pleasure also causes him to neglect Xiyi and start a string of dirty affairs, causing Xinyi to eventually file for a divorce.
- Wang Xiyi (in the Philippine airing: Marissa Wang) (Fann Wong): Beautiful, intelligent and determined, Xiyi has painstakingly worked her way up to become one of the restaurant's executives. Her sensitivity to the needs of others and selflessness has earned her the respect and trust of the Jia household. Even so, her envious sister-in-law Zengyue (Aileen Tan) continues to hold a grudge against her for her constant success.
- Jia Zengyue (in the Philippine airing: Cynthia Jia) (Aileen Tan): As Mrs. Jia's sole daughter, Zengyue is a capable but unscrupulous woman who will do anything for personal gain. She remains resentful over her position as a finance administrator and harbours more ambitious designs. Her self-interest and jealousy often puts her in enmity with other household members.
- Jia Zengmu (in the Philippine airing: Andrew Jia) (Huang Wenyong): While Zengmu is usually perceived as stable and well-organized, doing everything on an even keel, he is in fact a timid side-liner when it comes to making decisions. His father's unexpected death forces him to take on the role of general manager despite his shortcomings. Zengmu is also a paranoid, taking extreme measures when it comes to safe-guarding his health. He eventually dies on the same day with his wife Guiying (Lin Meijiao). The reason of him passing on is because of a quarrel with Zengyue, and that resulted in a heart attack. His wife died in a car accident while rushing to the hospital to see her husband.

== See also ==
- Women of Times Theme Song
- Women of Times (Chinese)
