= A Life of Hope =

- 活下去
- Written by: Ang Eng Tee
- Starring: Chen Hanwei; Laura Fang; Tay Ping Hui; Elvin Ng; Joanne Peh; Julian Hee
- Original language: Chinese
- No. of episodes: 20

Production
- Running time: approx. 45 minutes

Original release
- Network: MediaCorp TV Channel 8
- Release: 21 March – 15 April 2005

A Life of Hope (活下去) is a Singaporean drama which aired on Channel 8. It debuted on 21 March 2005 and consists of 20 episodes.

== Cast ==
- Chen Hanwei as Pan Zhi Hao (潘志豪)
- Laura Fang as Lin Xiu Ming (林秀明)
- Tay Ping Hui as Su Dong Ping (苏东平)
- Elvin Ng as Liang Yi (良一)
- Joanne Peh as Fei Fei (飞飞)

== Accolades ==
Organisation	Year	Category	Nominee	Result	Ref
Star Awards	2005	Best Actor	Chen Hanwei	Won	
