= Yio Chu Kang Secondary School =

- 崇文中学
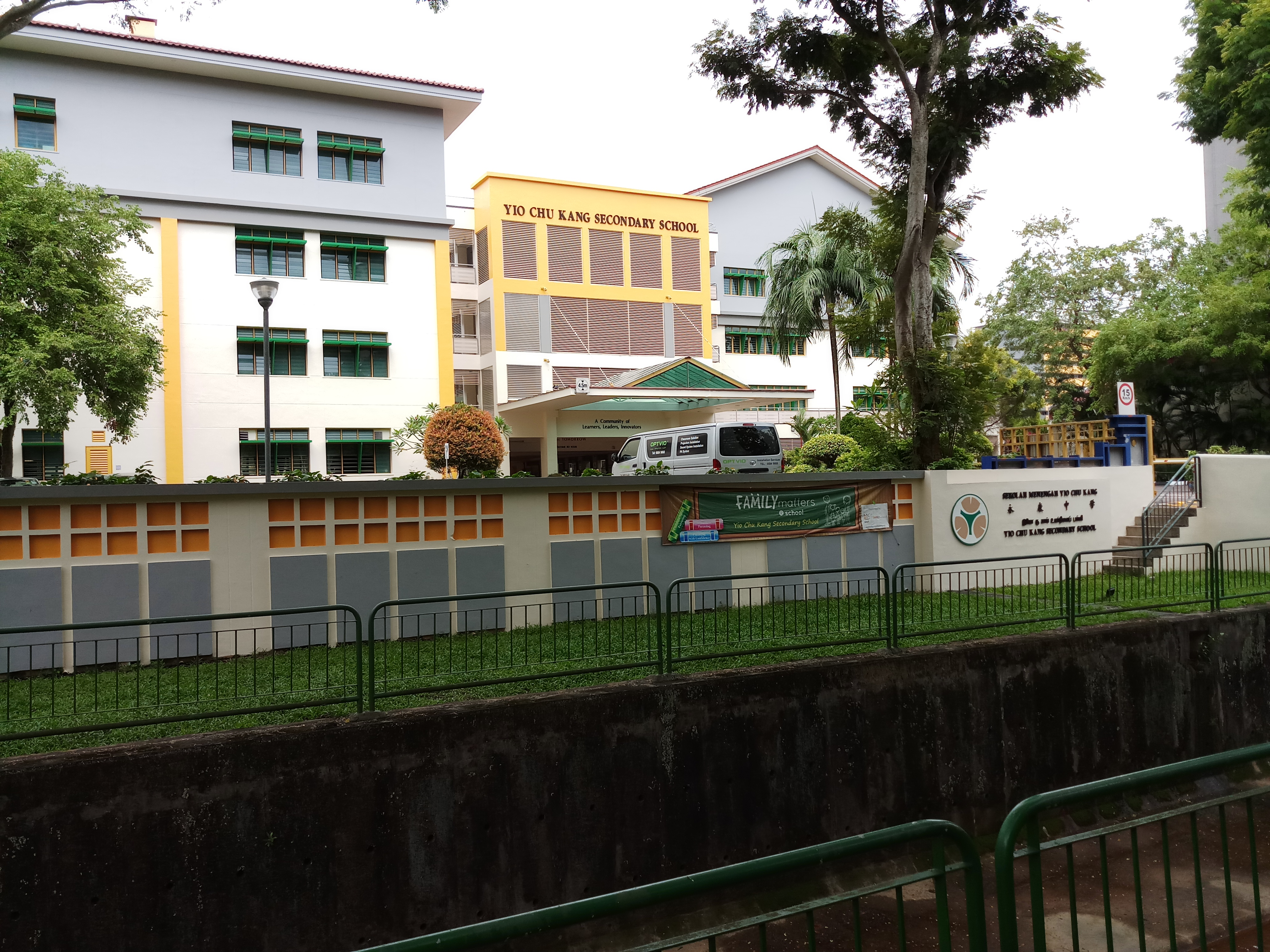

Location
- 3063 Ang Mo Kio Avenue 5, Singapore 569868; Ang Mo Kio, Singapore; 1.3781°N 103.8418°E

Information
- Type: Government
- Motto: Pursuit of Knowledge, Service to All
- Established: 1965
- Session: Single
- Principal: Mrs Betty Chow
- Colour: Green Orange
- Website: http://www.yiochukangsec.moe.edu.sg

Yio Chu Kang Secondary School is a co-educational government school in Ang Mo Kio, Singapore. It was first opened in 1966, and moved to its current site in 1982.

== History ==
Yio Chu Kang Secondary began operations in 1966, and was set up in response to a request by Yio Chu Kang residents to Prime Minister Lee Kuan Yew for a secondary school. It was initially located at the tenth milestone of Yio Chu Kang Road, housed in a S$444,000 campus. In 1982, the school moved to new premises along Ang Mo Kio Avenue 5 and the new premises were officially opened on 26 August 1983 by Lau Ping Sum, Member of Parliament for Yio Chu Kang.

== Merger with Chong Boon Secondary School ==
In January 2018, the school merged with former Chong Boon Secondary School. The merged school is located at the current Yio Chu Kang campus. At the time of the merger, the principal was Mr Yeo Kuerk Heng.

== Notable alumni ==
- Miko Bai and Yumi Bai, Mandopop singers
- Pan Lingling, actress
- Shawn Thia, actor
