= Daddy at Home =

- 企鹅爸爸
- Genre: Family; Comedy
- Created by: Winnie Wong 王尤红; Tang Yeow 陈耀
- Directed by: Wong Kuang Yong 黄光荣
- Starring: Li Nanxing; Chen Hanwei; Dawn Yeoh; Ann Kok; Cynthia Koh; Adam Chen
- Opening theme: 男能可贵 by Cavin Soh
- Country of origin: Singapore
- Original language: Chinese
- No. of episodes: 20

Production
- Producer: Winnie Wong 王尤红
- Running time: approx. 45 minutes per episode

Original release
- Network: MediaCorp TV Channel 8
- Release: 2 November 2009 – 15 March 2010

Related
- Baby Bonus; Together; Nanny Daddy (2008)

Daddy at Home (企鹅爸爸) is a Singaporean television series which debuted on the local Chinese language channel Channel 8 on 2 November 2009. It stars Li Nanxing, Chen Hanwei, Ann Kok, Cynthia Koh, Dawn Yeoh & Adam Chen as the casts of the series. It was screened every night at 9pm from Monday to Friday.

The series' Chinese title literally means "penguin father". As the series is about house husbands, the title was derived from the fact that Emperor penguins are the only penguin species of which the male is fully responsible for incubating the eggs.

== Plot ==
Liu Bang is senior vice-president of a bank and takes great pride in his social standing. His friend Ye Zhengkang is a house husband who looks after the household and children while his wife Meihui owns a beauty parlour. Liu Bang, being a traditionalist, disapproves of this arrangement but Zhengkang is undaunted by the unwanted attention he occasionally receives due to his unusual "occupation".

However, the financial crisis hits Singapore and both Liu Bang and Zhengkang find themselves cash-strapped. Liu Bang in particular was the worst affected. As he had offended a superior years ago, he quickly became a target in the mass entrenchment. His wife Xinbei is forced to find a job to support the family. Liu Bang has to swallow his ego as he is suddenly forced to take over homemaker duties from his wife.

Meanwhile, Meihui's younger brother Jinfeng moves in with the family. The carefree happy-go-lucky Jinfeng falls head over heels for his nephew's tuition teacher Ruxuan and tries his best to woo her.

== Cast ==
=== Main cast ===
Artiste	Character	Description
Li Nanxing	Liu Bang 刘帮	Xinbei's husband
Chen Hanwei	Ye Zhengkang 叶正康	Meihui's husband
Ann Kok	Yang Xinbei 杨欣北	Liu Bang's wife
Cynthia Koh	Chen Meihui 陈美惠	Zhengkang's wife
Dawn Yeoh	Xia Ruxuan 夏如萱	Xiyuan's tuition teacher and zhen feng's girlfriend
Adam Chen	Chen Jinfeng "Botak" 陈进峰	Meihui's younger brother and ruxuan's boyfriend

=== Supporting cast ===
Artiste	Character	Description
Yan Bingliang 严丙量	Yang Shuyong 杨树勇	Xinbei's father
Zhu Xiufeng 朱秀凤	Lin Aijuan 林爱娟	Xinbei's mother
Rachel Chua 蔡艾珈	Ye Xilei 叶希雷	Zhengkang and Meihui's daughter
Jarrett Lee 李弘	Ye Xiyuan 叶希源	Zhengkang and Meihui's son
Megan Goh 吴乐轩	Liu Si'en 刘思恩	Liu Bang and Xinbei's daughter
Bernard Tan	Wyman	Xinbei's colleague and friend
Chen Huihui		
Hu Wensui		

== Reception ==
Average viewership for each episode is 963,000.

=== Accolades ===
Organisation	Year	Category	Nominee(s)	Result	Ref.
Star Awards	2010	Best Actor	Chen Hanwei	Won	
Star Awards	2010	Best Drama Serial	—N/a	Nominated	
Star Awards	2010	Best Theme Song	男能可贵 by Cavin Soh	Nominated	
Star Awards	2010	Best Screenplay	Winne Wong/Tang Yeow	Nominated	
