= Shawn Thia =

Singaporean actor (born 1995)

- Born: 7 December 1995 (age 30); Singapore
- Other name: Cheng Jiajie
- Education: Hougang Primary School; Yio Chu Kang Secondary School
- Alma mater: Management Development Institute of Singapore
- Occupations: Actor; TikTok personality
- Years active: 2015−present
- Partner(s): Xenia Tan (married; 2022−present)

Chinese name
- Traditional Chinese: 程家頡
- Simplified Chinese: 程家颉
- Hanyu Pinyin: Chéng Jiājié
- Website: www.shawnthia.net

Shawn Thia (born 7 December 1995) is a Singaporean actor.

== Early life and career ==
Thia has an older sister. His parents divorced when he was a toddler, and he has not been in contact with his father since secondary school. Thia's mother used to run a business doing post-natal massages and has since retired.

Thia attended Hougang Primary School and Yio Chu Kang Secondary School. He was originally in the Express stream, but was placed in the Normal Academic stream in Secondary 3. He eventually dropped out of school at age 15, and went on to do odd jobs for a year before sitting for his O Levels as a private candidate. He did not do well for the exams and half a year later, he enlisted in the army at the age of 16. Subsequently, he completed a private diploma in mass communications at MDIS, and began acting in 2015, appearing in a number of commercials and student films. At one point, Thia drove for Uber. In 2017, he took up a job in the marine industry running offshore operations and remained on the job for about two years. He auditioned for a role in Titoudao: Inspired by the True Story of a Wayang Star and was successfully cast in 2019, and thereafter began full-time acting.

He was once managed by TCP Artistes and is currently signed to SGAG, a social media agency.

== Personal life ==
Thia is a Christian.

In May 2022, Thia announced his engagement to online personality and actress Xenia Tan. The couple are currently living together in a rented HDB flat. They began dating after co-starring in The Algorithm, a six-episode drama series. Both had also appeared in a Fresh Takes! series short and the long-form drama Sunny Side Up.

== Filmography ==
Thia has appeared in the following programmes and films:

=== Television series ===
- Fried Rice Paradise (2019)
- Love Shop (2019)
- 128 Circle (2019)
- Titoudao: Inspired by the True Story of a Wayang Star (2020)
- Reunion (2021)
- The Algorithm (2021)
- Sunny Side Up (2022−present)
- Genie In A Cup (2022)
- My One and Only (2023)

=== Web series ===
- Tiles War (2020)

=== Film ===
- High (2020; NCADA interactive short film)

=== Variety and reality show ===
- Streamers Go Live (2022)

=== Music video appearances ===
- "Shine Your Light" (2023; NDP theme song)

== Awards and nominations ==
Year	Award	Category	Nominated work	Result	Ref
2023	Star Awards	Top 3 Most Popular Rising Stars	—N/a	Nominated	
2024	Star Awards	Top 3 Most Popular Rising Stars	—N/a	Nominated	
