= Love Me, Love Me Not (Singaporean TV series) =

Love Me, Love Me Not (真爱无敌) is a romance drama about two angels who must fulfill a mission to make certain people fall in love. It stars Jacelyn Tay, Xie Shaoguang, Wong Li-Lin, Chen Hanwei and Dennis Chew.

== Plot ==
Two angels, Hong Luanxing (Jacelyn Tay, the Love Star) and Gu Guaxing (Wong Li-Lin, the Lonesome Star), are sent to Earth as a punishment for breaking a rule in heaven. On Earth, they take on new identities as Song Xingxing, a lawyer, and Song Jingjing, a matchmaker from the Social Development Board. Their punishment is to complete conflicting tasks: Hong Luanxing, the Love Star, now is a lawyer and has to break couples up. Gu Guaxing, the Lonesome Star, now has to pair singles up. Each of them has to break up/pair up 100 couples before their punishment is considered complete. Xingxing and Jingjing fell in love with Ziyan and Yiqin respectively later on in the show. In the end, both of the angels went back to heaven after completing their punishments and Xingxing broke another rule on purpose again in order to be sent back to Earth, so that she can be with Ziyan again. Yiqin was hit by a coconut on his head and died, thus went to heaven and Jingjing can be with him once again with a happy ending.

== Cast ==
- Jacelyn Tay as Hong Luanxing (Song Xingxing)
- Wong Li-Lin as Gu Guaxing (Song Jingjing)
- Xie Shaoguang as Zhao Ziyan
- Chen Hanwei as Lin Yiqin
- Dennis Chew as Xiongxiong
- Chen Huihui

== Accolades ==
Organisation	Year	Category	Nominee	Result	Ref
Star Awards	2001	Best Actor	Chen Hanwei	Won	
Star Awards	2001	Best Supporting Actress	Chen Huihui	Nominated	
