= Kidnapper (film) =

2010 Singaporean film

- Official film poster
- Directed by: Kelvin Tong
- Starring: Christopher Lee; Phyllis Quek; Jack Lim
- Production companies: Scorpio East Pictures; RAM Entertainment; PMP Entertainment; Boku Films
- Distributed by: Golden VillagePictures; MediaCorp Raintree Pictures; Scorpio East Pictures
- Release date: 18 March 2010
- Running time: 98 minutes
- Country: Singapore
- Language: Chinese

Kidnapper (Chinese: 绑匪; pinyin: Bǎngfěi) is a 2010 Singaporean thriller film about a kidnap set in Singapore. The first action-thriller film made by Kelvin Tong, it was a joint venture between Scorpio East Pictures of Singapore and RAM Pictures and PMP Entertainment from Malaysia. Tong opted for a thriller film as opposed to a full-fledged action film as he felt this was more realistic in Singapore saying "people here (in Singapore) don't run around with machine guns".

== Plot ==
Lim is a struggling 40-year-old taxi driver whose wife divorced him years ago. He has a close relationship with his son, Wei Xiang, whom he chauffeurs to school every day. Mistaken for a rich man's son, Wei Xiang is kidnapped one day at an arcade and held for a ransom of S$1 million. Thus begins one father's relentless quest to get his son back. Events begin with Lim and his son in a taxi, making attempts to guess the final fare on the taxi metre as they make their way through Singapore' jammed streets on the way to school. After school, Wei Xiang follows his friend to an arcade. He is then mistakenly kidnapped after donning his friend's cap. Upon realising that his son is kidnapped Lim is then made to race through Singapore to meet tight time frames in order to appease the kidnapper.

== Cast ==
- Christopher Lee
- Phyllis Quek

== Production ==
Scorpio East Pictures co-financed the film with Malaysia’s RAM Entertainment.

== Release ==
Media Asia Entertainment Group had the distribution rights for the world excluding Singapore and Malaysia.
