= Morning Express (1995 TV series) =

- Title card
- 阳光列车
- Genre: Modern Inspirational Drama
- Starring: Huang Shi Nan; Richard Low; Huang Biren; Ann Kok; Mai Hao Wei; Angela Ang; Fann Wong; Chen Hanwei; Zhang Xinxiang
- Country of origin: Singapore
- Original language: Chinese
- No. of episodes: 20

Production
- Running time: approx. 45 minutes

Original release
- Network: Channel 8
- Release: 1995

Morning Express (Simplified Chinese: 阳光列车) is a 20-episode Singaporean television drama series produced by Television Corporation of Singapore in 1995. It revolves around a dedicated secondary school teacher, who, after some bad brushes with the law in the past, seeks to inspire his students.

== Cast ==
- Chen Hanwei as Fang Ansheng
- Fann Wong as Ye Xin Ping
- Ann Kok as Ye Xiao Jing

== Accolades ==
Organisation	Year	Category	Nominee	Result	Ref.
Star Awards	1996	Best Actor	Chen Hanwei	Nominated	
