= Joey Swee =

Singaporean actress (born 1977)

- Born: 5 June 1977 (age 49); Singapore
- Other name: Xu Qi
- Occupations: Actress; host; model
- Years active: 1997–2009; 2018–present
- Children: 3
- Modeling information
- Height: 1.7 m (5 ft 7 in)
- Hair color: Brown
- Eye color: Brown

Stage name
- Traditional Chinese: 徐綺
- Simplified Chinese: 徐绮
- Hanyu Pinyin: Xú Qǐ

Birth name
- Traditional Chinese: 徐琪
- Simplified Chinese: 徐琪
- Hanyu Pinyin: Xú Qí

Joey Swee (born 5 June 1977) is a Singaporean actress and television host. A former model, Swee entered showbiz as a Star Search semi-finalist contestant in 1997 and played her first leading role in the 1999 Channel 8 series My Teacher, My Friend.

She retired from acting in 2009 to become a full-time homemaker, and returned to screen in 2018 with the long-form drama series Reach for the Skies.

== Personal life ==
Besides English and Mandarin, Swee also speaks Hokkien.

In 2000, Swee received warning from the traffic police for a speeding offence.

Since 2005, Swee has been married to Indonesian-Chinese businessman Gani Bustan, the CEO of a coal and mining company who is based in Jakarta, Indonesia. They have three sons - Kynaston, Jefferson and Algernon.

Swee does aerial yoga and hiking.

== Filmography ==
Swee has appeared in the following programmes and films:

=== Television series ===
- Tuition Fever (1997)
- Not The Facts (1997)
- The Test Of Time (1997)
- Office Affairs (1998)
- The Return of the Condor Heroes (1998)
- Stand by Me (1998)
- S.N.A.G (1999)
- My Teacher, My Friend (1999)
- My Teacher, My Buddy (2000)
- You Light Up My Life (2000)
- As You Like It (2000)
- Right Frequency II (2000)
- Health Matters (2001)
- The Reunion (2001)
- The Hotel (2001)
- My Genie II (2002)
- First Touch (2002)
- No Problem (2002)
- The Unbeatables III (2002)
- The Vagrant (2002)
- Man at Forty (2003)
- My Love, My Home (2003)
- A Child's Hope (2003)
- Timeless Gift (2004)
- An Ode to Life (2004)
- Love Concierge (2005)
- Baby Blues (2005)
- Beyond the aXis of Truth II (2005)
- My Dear Kins (2006)
- Women of Times (2006)
- Taste of Love (2007)
- The Golden Path (2007)
- Live Again (2007)
- Dear, Dear Son-In-Law (2007)
- Perfect Cut (2008)
- Crime Busters x 2 (2008)
- Housewives' Holiday (2009)
- Reach for the Skies (2018)
- Jungle Survivor (2020)
- Strike Gold (2023)
- I believe I can fly (2024)
- Unforgivable 不可饶恕的罪恶 (2024)
- Lost and Found 迷茫又无惧的我们 (2025)
- The Leftovers 幸存者 (2025)
- Brighter Days 家的守护星 (2025)

=== Web series ===
- A Lonely Fish (2018)

The Executioner (2025)

=== Film ===
- Autumn in March (2009)
- Luck my life 我的人生我自摸 (2025) Movie

=== Variety and reality show ===
- Weekend Delight (2001)
- City Beat (2001)
- City Network (2001)
- Beautiful People (2002)
- LNY Special (2002)
- Beautiful People II (2003)
- Shopper’s Guide Tiger (2003)
- King Of Variety (2004)
- Beautiful People 3 (2004)
- Lunar New Year Show (2004)
- Beautiful People 4 (2005)
- Be Somebody (2005)
- Lets Go Shopping (2008)
- Superman Juniors (2021)
- 医聊大小事 (2025)
- Stargames (2025)

== Awards and nominations ==
Year	Award	Category	Nominated work	Result	Ref
1996	Model Of The World	—N/a	—N/a	Won	
1998	Star Awards	Most Popular Newcomer	The Test Of Time	Nominated	
2002	Star Awards	Best Supporting Actress	The Reunion	Nominated	
2004	Star Awards	Top 10 Most Popular Female Artistes	—N/a	Nominated	
