= Chen Hanwei =

Malaysian actor based in Singapore (born 1969)

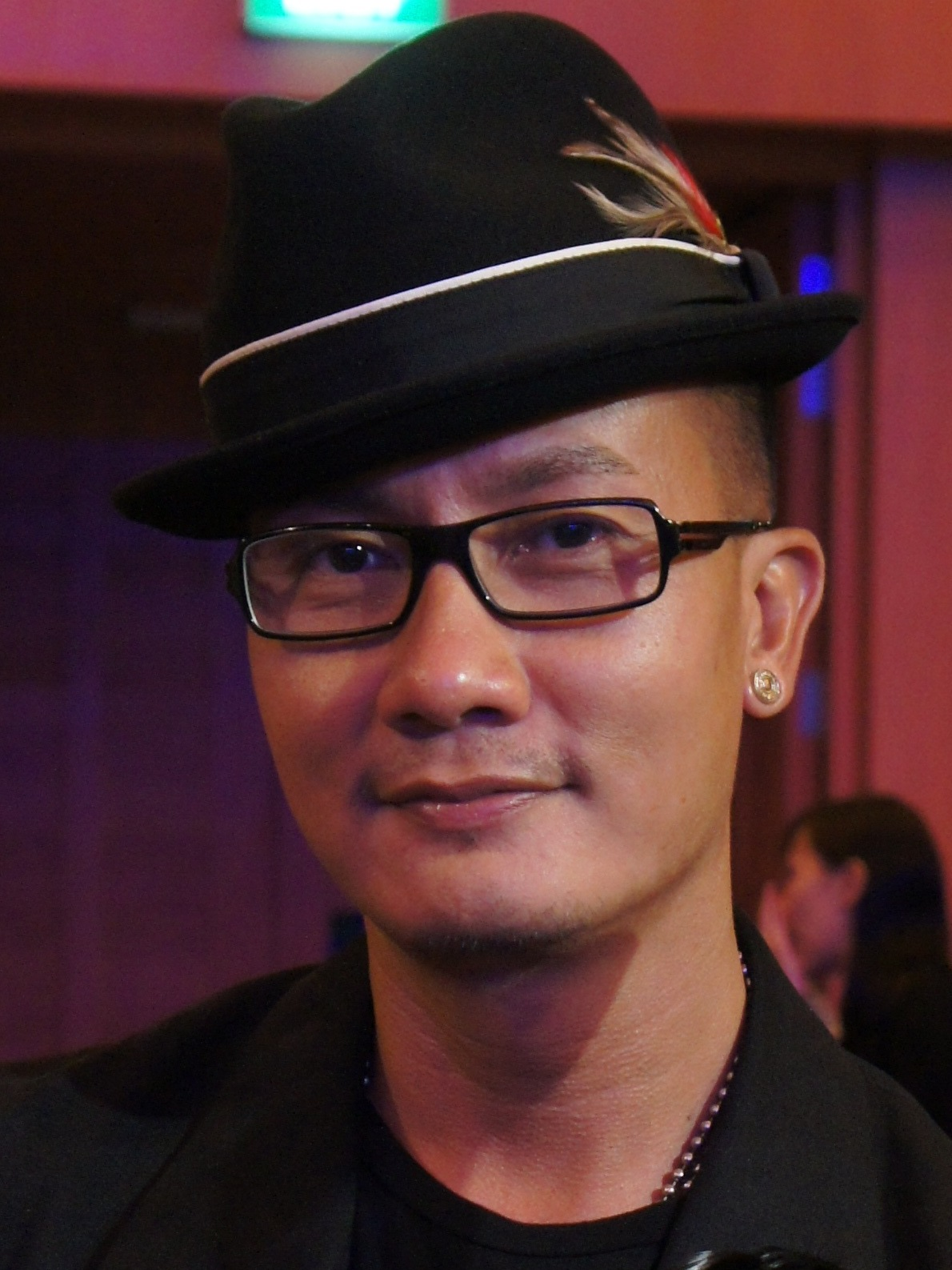
- Chen at the Star Awards 2011
- Born: Tan Hung Wee; 29 August 1969 (age 57); Johor Bahru, Malaysia
- Education: Foon Yew High School
- Occupations: Actor; host; singer; former fashion coordinator
- Years active: 1988–present
- Agent: The Celebrity Agency
- Awards: Full list

Chinese name
- Traditional Chinese: 陳漢瑋
- Simplified Chinese: 陈汉玮
- Hanyu Pinyin: Chén Hànwěi
- Jyutping: Can4 Hon3 Wai5
- Hokkien POJ: Tân Hàn-úi

Chen Hanwei (born Tan Hung Wee on 29 August 1969) is a Malaysian actor, host and former fashion coordinator based in Singapore.

Chen had received seven Star Awards for Best Actor, a record for the most wins in that category.

== Early life ==
Chen Hanwei grew up in Kampung Ungku Mohsin, Johor Bahru, Malaysia. Adopted since birth, Chen was raised in an impoverished background and had completed his studies at Foon Yew High School, one of the country's Chinese independent schools.

== Career ==
In 1996, Chen was first nominated for the Star Awards for Best Actor for his role in Morning Express. In 2001, he was nominated again for his role in Love Me, Love Me Not and won his first Best Actor award. He won his next Best Actor nomination in 2005 for his role in A Life of Hope.

== Filmography ==
=== Film ===
Year	Title	Role	Notes	Ref.
1995	Cupid Love	Xu Wenqiang	Telemovie	
2013	Ghost Child	Choon		
2013	Love ... and Other Bad Habits	Chin Wei	Telemovie	

=== Television series ===
Year	Title	Role	Notes	Ref.
1988	Strange Encounters II 奇缘之怨偶天成	Lao Long / Zhao Jincai		
1988	Song Of Youth 生活歌手	Ah Qing		
1988	My Fair Ladies 窈窕淑女	Liu Weiliang		
1989	Turn Of The Tide 浮沉	Fishery store assistant		
1989	Patrol 铁警雄风	Overseas student		
1989	A Mother's Love 亲心唤我心	Zhiguang		
1989	We Are Family 四代同堂	Peter		
1989	Splash Victory 绿水英姿	Peter		
1989	Magic Of Dance 鼓舞青春			
1989	Fortune Hunter 钻石人生	Peter		
1990	The Village Hero 大吉传奇	Mo Xiaofeng		
1990	By My Side 逆风天使	David		
1990	Wishing Well 幻海奇遇	Shi Diwen		
1990	Against The Wind 启航	Weng Zhenkang		
1991	Romance Of The Season 恋曲1991	Pan Lei		
1991	Changing Fortunes 天赐奇财	Chen Qicai		
1991	Secret Operations 急转弯	Zhou Zhicong		
1991	Private Eyes 妙探智多星	Gao Yangming		
1991	Behind Bars 铁狱雷霆	Yu Zhenfei		
1992	Between Friends 山水喜相逢	Piere		
1992	Breaking Point 暴风边缘	Bai Yuqing		
1993	Heaven's Will 天机风云	Xu Wei		
1993	Happy Foes 欢喜冤家	Shi Qingyun		
1993	Sister Dearest 傻妹俏娇娃	Mingxing		
1994	The Magnate 叱咤风云	Zhou Nansheng		
1994	Twin Bliss 龙凤呈祥	Xia Letian		
1994	Young Justice Bao 侠义包公	Bai Yutang		
1995	King Of Hades 阎罗传奇	Ji Zhongkang / Du Ping		
1995	Morning Express	Fang Ansheng		
1996	Morning Express II 阳光列车II	Fang Ansheng		
1996	Beyond Dawn 女子监狱	Tian Yuanjun		
1996	Of Cops & Men 城市双雄	Wang Junwei		
1996	Undercover 义胆浓情	Gao Xiang		
1996	Creative Edge 创意先锋	Huang Longhui		
1997	Curtain Call 大锣大鼓	Xu Zhenhui		
1997	Time after Time 我来自1997	Fang Weizhong		
1997	The Guest People	Hu Xusheng		
1999	Millennium Bug 千年虫	Zhuang Mingxuan		
2000	Knotty Liaison 爱情百科	Shen Shouye		
2000	Don't Worry, Be Happy S5 敢敢做个开心人	Sam Tan		
2001	The Hotel	Sunny		
2001	Don't Worry, Be Happy S6 敢敢做个开心人 S6	Sam Tan		
2001	Love Me, Love Me Not	Lin Yiqin		
2002	Vive La Famille 好儿好女	Thomas		
2002	No Problem 考试家族	Bao Jinfu		
2002	Fantasy 星梦情真	Peng Haoran		
2002	Springs of Life 春到人间	Zhou Junsheng		
2003	Viva Le Famille II 好儿好女 II	Thomas		
2003	My Love, My Home 同一屋檐下	Situ Haixing		
2004	Man at Forty	Chen Longhui		
2004	Room in My Heart 真心蜜语	Ding Wenhui		
2005	My Lucky Charm	Li Jinfa		
2005	A Life of Hope	Pan Zhihao		
2005	Baby Blues	Jiang Weijie		
2006	Women of Times	Ding Hanzhe		
2006	Rhapsody in Blue	Guo Yongtao		
2006	House of Joy	Huang Letian		
2007	The Greatest Love of All	Zhao Jiaming		
2007	Metamorphosis	Ouyang Li		
2008	Taste of Love	Hu Yingbang		
2008	By My Side	Chen Bufan		
2009	Reunion Dinner	Liu Jiachang		
2009	My School Daze	Tan Xiangchun		
2009	Daddy at Home	Ye Zhengkang		
2010	The Best Things in Life	Chen Wufu		
2010	With You	Zhang Yang		
2011	Be Happy	Zhang Weijian		
2011	Devotion	Huang Dake		
2011	A Song to Remember	Xu Kun		
2012	It Takes Two	Niu Wuyin		
2013	The Dream Makers	Yu Fan		
2013	The Enchanted	Shi Zhuangbi		
2014	Yes We Can!	Hong Qinshan		
2014	Blessings	Lian Daxi		
2014	The Journey: Tumultuous Times	Hu Weiren		
2014	118	Li Weiliang		
2015	Tiger Mum	Antonio Chen Hongyu	Cameo	
2015	The Dream Makers II	Yu Fan	Cameo	
2016	The Truth Seekers	Bai Qingxiong		
2016	The Gentlemen	Zhang Naiping		
2016	Hero	Ye Xiaoying		
2016	118 II	Li Weiliang		
2017	The Lead	Lin Xiahu		
2018	118 Reunion	Li Weiliang		
2018	A Million Dollar Dream	Zhang Zicheng		
2018	Blessings 2 祖先保佑 2	Lian Daxi		
2019	How Are You? 2	Mr Zhao	Cameo	
2019	Hello From The Other Side 阴错阳差	CEO Of Hell		
2019	Old Is Gold 老友万岁	Wang Lisheng		
2019	All Is Well - Singapore 你那边怎样，我这边OK - 新加坡版	Ye Licai		
2020	Super Dad 男神不败	Chen Kai		
2020	Recipe of Life 味之道	Zhou Beifa		
2022	Genie in a Cup 哇到宝	Ma Dabao		
2022	Healing Heroes 医生不是神	Ma Jianxing		
2023	Whatever Will Be, Will Be	Liu Bishan	Dialect series	
2025	The Gift of Time	Lam Shuimiao		

== Awards and nominations ==
Organisation	Year	Category	Nominated work	Result	Ref
Star Awards	1995	Best Actor	Twin Bliss	Nominated	
Star Awards	1995	Top 5 Most Popular Male Artistes	—N/a	Won	
Star Awards	1996	Best Actor	Morning Express	Nominated	
Star Awards	1996	Top 5 Most Popular Male Artistes	—N/a	Won	
Star Awards	2000	Top 10 Most Popular Male Artistes	—N/a	Won	
Star Awards	2001	Best Actor	Love Me, Love Me Not	Won	
Star Awards	2001	Top 10 Most Popular Male Artistes	—N/a	Won	
Star Awards	2002	Top 10 Most Popular Male Artistes	—N/a	Nominated	
Star Awards	2003	Top 10 Most Popular Male Artistes	—N/a	Nominated	
Star Awards	2004	Top 10 Most Popular Male Artistes	—N/a	Nominated	
Star Awards	2005	Best Actor	A Life of Hope	Won	
Star Awards	2005	Top 10 Most Popular Male Artistes	—N/a	Won	
Star Awards	2006	Top 10 Most Popular Male Artistes	—N/a	Nominated	
Star Awards	2007	Best Actor	House of Joy	Nominated	
Star Awards	2007	Top 10 Most Popular Male Artistes	—N/a	Nominated	
Star Awards	2009	Best Actor	By My Side	Won	
Star Awards	2009	Top 10 Most Popular Male Artistes	—N/a	Won	
Star Awards	2010	Best Actor	Daddy at Home	Won	
Star Awards	2010	Top 10 Most Popular Male Artistes	—N/a	Won	
Star Awards	2011	Top 10 Most Popular Male Artistes	—N/a	Won	
Star Awards	2011	Favourite Onscreen Couple (Drama)	With You	Nominated	
Star Awards	2011	Favourite Male Character	The Best Things in Life	Nominated	
Star Awards	2012	Best Supporting Actor	A Song to Remember	Nominated	
Star Awards	2012	Top 10 Most Popular Male Artistes	—N/a	Won	
Star Awards	2013	Top 10 Most Popular Male Artistes	—N/a	Won	
Star Awards	2014	Best Actor	The Dream Makers	Nominated	
Star Awards	2014	All-Time Favourite Artiste	—N/a	Won	
Star Awards	2014	Star Awards for Most Popular Regional Artiste (China)	—N/a	Nominated	
Star Awards	2014	Star Awards for Most Popular Regional Artiste (Malaysia)	—N/a	Nominated	
Star Awards	2014	Star Awards for Most Popular Regional Artiste (Cambodia)	—N/a	Nominated	
Star Awards	2015	Best Actor	Blessings	Nominated	
Star Awards	2015	Best Supporting Actor	The Journey: Tumultuous Times	Won	
Star Awards	2016	Best Actor	118	Nominated	
Star Awards	2016	Toggle Most Beloved Celebrity BFF Award	—N/a	Nominated	
Star Awards	2017	Best Actor	The Gentlemen	Won	
Star Awards	2018	Best Supporting Actor	The Lead	Won	
Star Awards	2019	Best Actor	A Million Dollar Dream	Won	
Star Awards	2019	Best Programme Host	Away With My BFF	Nominated	
Star Awards	2021	Best Actor	Super Dad	Nominated	
Star Awards	2021	Best Programme Host	House Everything?	Nominated	
Star Awards	2022	Best Actor	Recipe of Life	Won	
Star Awards	2024	Best Actor	Whatever Will Be, Will Be	Nominated	
Star Awards	2025	Best Supporting Actor	Unforgivable	Won	
Star Awards	2026	Best Actor	The Gift of Time	Nominated	
Star Awards	2026	Most Emotional Performance	The Gift of Time	Nominated	
Star Awards	2026	Favourite CP	The Gift of Time	Nominated	
Asian Television Awards	2009	Best Actor in a Leading Role	By My Side	Nominated	
Asian Television Awards	2012	Best Actor in a Supporting Role	A Song to Remember	Nominated	
Asian Television Awards	2015	Best Actor in a Supporting Role	The Journey: Tumultuous Times	Nominated	
