= Star Awards for Best Actor =

Singaporean television award

Star Awards for Best Actor 最佳男主角
- Awarded for: Best Performance by an Actor in a Leading Role
- Country: Singapore
- Presented by: Mediacorp
- First award: 1995
- Most recent winner: Desmond Tan - Devil Behind The Gate (2026)

Highlights
- Most awards: Chen Hanwei (7)
- Most nominations: Chen Hanwei (16)

The Star Awards for Best Actor is an award presented annually at the Star Awards, a ceremony that was established in 1994.

The category was introduced in 1995, at the 2nd Star Awards ceremony; Li Nanxing received the award for his role in Wounded Tracks and it is given in honour of a Mediacorp actor who has delivered an outstanding performance in a leading role. The nominees are determined by a team of judges employed by Mediacorp; winners are selected by a majority vote from the entire judging panel.

Since its inception, the award has been given to 13 actors. Desmond Tan is the most recent winner in this category for his role in Devil Behind The Gate. Since the ceremony held in 2024, Chen Hanwei remains as the only actor to win in this category seven times, surpassing Xie Shaoguang who has five wins, and to have been nominated on 16 occasions, more than any other actors. Terence Cao is currently the actor who has the most nominations without a win, with six.

== Winners and nominees ==
Year	Actor	Work title (role)	Nominees
1995	Li Nanxing	Wounded Tracks (Xu Le 许乐)	Terence Cao — The Challenger (Lin Yongjie 林永杰); Chen Hanwei — Twin Bliss (Xia Letian 夏乐天); Chew Chor Meng — Challenge of Truth (Lin Haoming 林浩明); Huang Wenyong — Homes in 168 (Zhuo Tieshu 卓铁树)
1996	Xie Shaoguang	The Last Rhythm (Senchun Junxiong 森春俊雄)	Chen Hanwei — Morning Express (Fang Ansheng 方安生); Chew Chor Meng — The Teochew Family (Hong San 洪三); Huang Yiliang — Ace Cops (Wu Xifa 巫喜发); Li Nanxing — Somewhere in Time (Li Xiong 李雄)
1997	Christopher Lee	The Price of Peace (Xie Guomin 谢国民)	Li Nanxing — The Unbeatables II (Yan Fei 言飞); James Lye — The Price of Peace (地哒城 Di Dacheng); Xie Shaoguang — The Legends of Jigong (Luo Han 罗汉); Zhu Houren — The Fall Guy (Huaimin 怀民)
1998	Xie Shaoguang	Stand by Me (Du Hanmin 杜汉民)	Terence Cao — Stand by Me (Du Hansheng 杜汉生); Chew Chor Meng — Immortal Love (Chen Xiaogui 陈小贵); Christopher Lee — The Return of the Condor Heroes (Yang Guo 杨过); Li Nanxing — The New Adventures of Wisely (Guo Zeqing 郭则清)
1999	Xie Shaoguang	Stepping Out (Zhang Jiafu 张家富)	Terence Cao — Stepping Out (Chen Xia 陈虾); Chew Chor Meng — Wok of Life (You Ri'an 尤日安); Christopher Lee — Riding the Storm 陌生人 (Zhong Qingtang 锺庆堂); Richard Low — Mr OK (Zhang A'tu 张阿突)
2000	Chew Chor Meng	Hainan Kopi Tales (Long Yaxing 龙亚星)	Terence Cao — Four Walls and a Ceiling (Shen Litai 沈利泰); Christopher Lee — Coup de Scorpion (Xie Tingzhang 谢廷璋); Li Nanxing — Coup de Scorpion (Zheng Nanshun 郑南顺); Tay Ping Hui — My Home Affairs (Hong Guoren 洪国仁)
2001	Chen Hanwei	Love Me, Love Me Not (Lin Yiqin 林以勤)	Edmund Chen — Beyond the Axis of Truth (Chen Xueming 陈学明); Huang Wenyong — Three Women and A Half (Zhang Yongxing 张永兴); Christopher Lee — Looking for Stars (Henry); Li Nanxing — Dare to Strike (Wang Shen 王深)
2002	Li Nanxing	The Vagrant (Bao 阿豹)	Terence Cao — The Reunion (Chen Guanjun 陈冠军); Chen Shucheng — Viva Le Famille (Sun Yongshun 孙永顺); Chew Chor Meng — The Reunion (Li Kechun 李克淳); Xie Shaoguang — Beautiful Connection (Lion King)
2003	Xie Shaoguang	Holland V (Yang Xiong 杨雄)	Chew Chor Meng — Springs of Life (Cai Dapao 蔡大炮); Christopher Lee — True Heroes (Chen Junhao 陈俊豪); Li Nanxing — The Unbeatables III (Yan Fei 言飞); Tay Ping Hui — Love Is Beautiful (Zheng Liheng 郑力恒)
2004	Xie Shaoguang	Double Happiness I (Luo Jialong 罗家龙)	Edmund Chen — Man at Forty (Chen Longwei 陈龙威); Christopher Lee — Timeless Gift (Wang Jie 王捷); Li Nanxing — A Child's Hope II (Hu Yiming 胡逸名); Qi Yuwu — Room in My Heart (Zhu Jiankang 祝健康)
2005	Chen Hanwei	A Life of Hope (Pan Zhihao 潘志豪)	Huang Wenyong — Destiny (Shen Congye 沈从业); Christopher Lee — A New Life (Zhang Youfu 张有福); Adrian Pang — Portrait of Home (Zhou Dadi 周大地); Tay Ping Hui — A Life of Hope (Su Dongping 苏东平)
2006	Li Nanxing	The Undisclosed (Cheng Musheng 程木胜)	Adrian Pang — Portrait of Home II (Zhou Dadi 周大地); Pierre Png — The Shining Star (Wuming 无名); Qi Yuwu — C.I.D. (Tang Siwei 唐思伟); Tay Ping Hui — C.I.D. (Chen Long Sean 陈龙)
2007	Zheng Geping	Like Father, Like Daughter (Dai Zhigang 戴志刚)	Chen Hanwei — House of Joy (Huang Letian 黄乐天); Qi Yuwu — The Peak (Chen Tianjun 陈天俊); Tay Ping Hui — Mars vs Venus (Liu Yifan Steven 刘一凡); Zhang Yaodong — The Greatest Love of All (Zhao Jiaxuan 赵家轩)
2009	Chen Hanwei	By My Side (Chen Bufan 陈不凡)	Huang Wenyong — Just in Singapore (Lin Bang Francis 林邦); Adrian Pang — Nanny Daddy (Liu Zhuolun Alan 刘卓伦); Pierre Png — The Little Nyonya (Chen Sheng 陈盛); Qi Yuwu — The Little Nyonya (Chen Xi 陈锡); Tay Ping Hui — The Golden Path (Ng Kay Kiat 黄凯杰)
2010	Chen Hanwei	Daddy at Home (Ye Zhengkang 叶正康)	Dai Xiangyu — Together (Lin Xiaobei 林小杯); Elvin Ng — Together (Huang Zhihao 黄志豪); Tay Ping Hui — The Ultimatum (Sun Jie 孙捷); Brandon Wong — Housewives' Holiday (Chen Weibin 陈伟斌)
2011	Qi Yuwu	The Family Court (Lin Leshan 林乐山)	Shaun Chen — Your Hand In Mine (Li Liqin 李立勤); Christopher Lee — Breakout (Situ Dongcheng 司徒东城); Elvin Ng — Breakout (Zou Jieming 邹杰明); Tay Ping Hui — The Family Court (Shen Xiping 沈希平)
2012	Tay Ping Hui	Bountiful Blessings (Xie Donghai 谢东海)	Andie Chen — Code of Honour (Ou Jianfeng 欧剑锋); Christopher Lee — The Oath (Wu Guo'en 吴国恩); Qi Yuwu — C.L.I.F. (Tang Yew Jia 唐耀佳); Zheng Geping — Kampong Ties (Zeng Youbao 曾友宝)
2013	Christopher Lee	Show Hand (Zhang Qiming 张启明)	Chew Chor Meng — Joys of Life (Zhao Dagou 赵大狗); Dai Xiangyu — Poetic Justice (Fang Zhengye 方正业); Thomas Ong — Pillow Talk (Zhang Qiuyu 张秋雨); Pierre Png — Pillow Talk (He Tingkai 何廷凯)
2014	Pierre Png	The Journey: A Voyage (Heilong 黑龙)	Terence Cao — The Journey: A Voyage (Zhang Guangda 张广达); Chen Hanwei — The Dream Makers (Yu Fan 余凡); Qi Yuwu — The Dream Makers (Jason Lam 蓝钦辉); Bryan Wong — Gonna Make It (Liu A'man 刘阿满)
2015	Shaun Chen	The Journey: Tumultuous Times (Hu Jia 胡佳)	Chen Hanwei — Blessings (Lian Daxi 连大喜); Christopher Lee — Against the Tide (Di Shen 狄深); Thomas Ong — Three Wishes (Zhao Yaozong 赵耀宗); Qi Yuwu — C.L.I.F. 3 (Tang Yew Jia 唐耀佳)
2016	Qi Yuwu	The Dream Makers II (Jason Lam 蓝钦辉)	Chen Hanwei — 118 (Li Weiliang 李伟良); Shaun Chen — The Journey: Our Homeland (Zhang Jia 张佳); Christopher Lee — Crescendo (Yang Yiwei 杨毅伟); Romeo Tan — The Dream Makers II (Zhong Yiming 钟一鸣)
2017	Chen Hanwei	The Gentlemen (Zhang Naiping 张乃平)	Andie Chen — If Only I Could (He Daxian 何大先); Shaun Chen — Hero (Zhou Fada 周发达); Pierre Png — The Gentlemen (Zhang Nailiang 张乃良); Zhang Zhenxuan — The Dream Job (Zhang Lixing 张立行)
2018	Desmond Tan	When Duty Calls (Loke Jun Guang 陆俊光)	Shaun Chen — My Friends from Afar (Yang Tiansheng 杨天生); Pierre Png — When Duty Calls (Daniel Tan 陈金保); Romeo Tan — Life Less Ordinary (Chen Yalong 陈亚龙); Zhang Zhenxuan — Home Truly (Su Dongbo 苏东博)
2019	Chen Hanwei	A Million Dollar Dream (Zhang Zicheng 张自成)	Shaun Chen — Blessings II (Lian Xuegeng 连学庚); Christopher Lee — Doppelganger (Yang Liwei 杨立威 / Li Ruiming 李锐明); Qi Yuwu — Mind Matters (Zhuo Jinshu 卓谨澍); Desmond Tan — You Can Be An Angel III (Xia Yaoyang Sunny 夏耀阳)
2021	Qi Yuwu	A Quest to Heal (Bi Zheng 毕正)	Chen Hanwei — Super Dad (Chen Kai 陈凯); Elvin Ng — All Is Well – Taiwan (Eric Loke 路瑞克); Pierre Png — A Jungle Survivor (Jiang Yongxi 江永熙); Desmond Tan — All Is Well – Singapore (Wu Pinrui 吴品叡); Romeo Tan — Happy Prince (Wang Zile 王子乐); Zhang Yaodong — Daybreak (Zheng Weilong 郑伟龙)
2022	Chen Hanwei	Recipe of Life (Zhou Beifa 周北发)	Jeremy Chan — Crouching Tiger Hidden Ghost (Ma Da 马达); Desmond Tan — Key Witness (Chen Zhiming 陈志明); Romeo Tan — Soul Old Yet So Young (Siak Mun Fong 石文丰); Xu Bin — My Star Bride (Chung Shee Jie 钟世杰)
2023	Richie Koh	Your World in Mine (Zheng Tiancai 郑天才)	Desmond Ng — Your World in Mine (Hong Maodan 洪茂丹); Qi Yuwu — Dark Angel (Zhu Wei 朱玮); Ayden Sng — The Unbreakable Bond (Gu Yuncong 顾允聪); Brandon Wong — Leave No Soul Behind (Feng Tianlong 冯天隆)
2024	Jeremy Chan	All That Glitters (Huang Jintiao 黄金条)	Andie Chen — Silent Walls (Zheng Haojie 郑浩杰); Chen Hanwei — Whatever Will Be, Will Be (Liu Bishan 刘必善); Richie Koh — Cash on Delivery (Lin Juncong 林俊聪); Desmond Tan — All That Glitters (Lin Musen 林木森)
2025	Christopher Lee	Kill Sera Sera (Allan Sun Ailun 孙艾伦)	Andie Chen — Born to Shine (Liu Yige 刘奕阁); Gavin Teo — To Be Loved (Hu Yingjun 胡英俊); Qi Yuwu — Once Upon A New Year's Eve (Cai Yiren 蔡一仁); Richie Koh — Coded Love (Lu Xiaoming 陆晓明)
2026	Desmond Tan	Devil Behind The Gate (Yuan Yingcai / Yuan Yingjie 袁英才 / 袁英杰)	Chen Hanwei - The Gift of Time (Lan Shuimiao 蓝水淼); Richie Koh - Another Wok of Life (Yan Zhenbang 颜振邦); Romeo Tan - Emerald Hill - The Little Nyonya Story (Zhang Jin Quan 张金泉); Xu Bin - Fixing Fate (Tan Choon Lim 陈春林)

== Nominees distribution chart ==
Colour key
Actor won the award
Actor was nominated for the award
Actor was not nominated for the award
Actor is currently nominated for the award

Actor	Year																														Wins	Noms
Actor	1995	1996	1997	1998	1999	2000	2001	2002	2003	2004	2005	2006	2007	2009	2010	2011	2012	2013	2014	2015	2016	2017	2018	2019	2021	2022	2023	2024	2025	2026	Wins	Noms
Chen Hanwei	N	N					1				2		N	3	4				N	N	N	5		6	N	7		N		N	7	16
Xie Shaoguang		1	N	2	3			N	4	5																					5	7
Li Nanxing	1	N	N	N		N	N	2	N	N		3																			3	10
Christopher Lee			1	N	N	N	N		N	N	N					N	N	2		N	N			N					3		3	15
Qi Yuwu										N		N	N	N		1	N		N	N	2			N	3		N		N		3	13
Desmond Tan																							1	N	N	N		N		2	2	6
Chew Chor Meng	N	N		N	N	1		N	N									N													1	8
Zheng Geping													1				N														1	2
Tay Ping Hui						N			N		N	N	N	N	N	N	1														1	9
Pierre Png												N		N				N	1			N	N		N						1	7
Shaun Chen																N				1	N	N	N	N							1	6
Richie Koh																											1	N	N	N	1	4
Jeremy Chan																										N		1			1	2
Terence Cao	N			N	N	N		N											N												0	6
Romeo Tan																					N		N		N	N				N	0	5
Huang Wenyong	N						N				N			N																	0	4
Andie Chen																	N					N						N	N		0	4
Adrian Pang											N	N		N																	0	3
Elvin Ng															N	N									N						0	3
Edmund Chen							N			N																					0	2
Zhang Yaodong													N												N						0	2
Dai Xiangyu															N			N													0	2
Brandon Wong															N												N				0	2
Thomas Ong																		N		N											0	2
Zhang Zhenxuan																						N	N								0	2
Xu Bin																										N				N	0	2
Huang Yiliang		N																													0	1
James Lye			N																												0	1
Zhu Houren			N																												0	1
Richard Low					N																										0	1
Chen Shucheng								N																							0	1
Bryan Wong																			N												0	1
Desmond Ng																											N				0	1
Ayden Sng																											N				0	1
Gavin Teo																													N		0	1

== Award records ==
Record	Actor	Count	Remarks
Most wins	Chen Hanwei 陈汉玮	7 wins	2001, 2005, 2009, 2010, 2017, 2019, 2022
Most nominations	Chen Hanwei 陈汉玮	16 nominations	1995, 1996, 2001, 2005, 2007, 2009, 2010, 2014, 2015, 2016, 2017, 2019, 2021, 2022, 2024, 2026
Longest gap between wins	Christopher Lee 李铭顺	16 years	1997—2013
Shortest gap between wins (consecutive wins)	Xie Shaoguang 谢韶光	1 year	1998—1999; 2003—2004
Shortest gap between wins (consecutive wins)	Chen Hanwei 陈汉玮	1 year	2009—2010
Most nominations before first award	Tay Ping Hui 郑斌辉	8 nominations	Won first award (9th nomination) in 2012
Most nominations without a win	Terence Cao 曹国辉	6 nominations	1995, 1998, 1999, 2000, 2002, 2014
Longest gap between nominations	Zhang Yaodong 张耀栋	14 years	2007—2021
Most consecutive nominations	Tay Ping Hui 郑斌辉	7 nominations	2005, 2006, 2007, 2009, 2010, 2011, 2012
Won at first nomination	Li Nanxing 李南星	6 actors	1995
Won at first nomination	Xie Shaoguang 谢韶光	6 actors	1996
Won at first nomination	Christopher Lee 李铭顺	6 actors	1997
Won at first nomination	Zheng Geping 郑各评	6 actors	2007
Won at first nomination	Desmond Tan 陈泂江	6 actors	2018
Won at first nomination	Richie Koh 许瑞奇	6 actors	2023
Won Best Supporting Actor and Best Actor	Xie Shaoguang 谢韶光	4 actors	1995, 1996 (Best Supporting Actor); 1996, 1998, 1999, 2003, 2004 (Best Actor)
Won Best Supporting Actor and Best Actor	Chew Chor Meng 周初明	4 actors	2009 (Best Supporting Actor); 2000 (Best Actor)
Won Best Supporting Actor and Best Actor	Tay Ping Hui 郑斌辉	4 actors	1999, 2013 (Best Supporting Actor); 2012 (Best Actor)
Won Best Supporting Actor and Best Actor	Chen Hanwei 陈汉玮	4 actors	2015, 2018 (Best Supporting Actor); 2001, 2005, 2009, 2010, 2017, 2019, 2022 (Best Actor)
Nominated for Best Supporting Actor and Best Actor in the same year	Xie Shaoguang 谢韶光	5 actors	1996
Nominated for Best Supporting Actor and Best Actor in the same year	Chen Shucheng 陈澍城	5 actors	2002
Nominated for Best Supporting Actor and Best Actor in the same year	Chen Hanwei 陈汉玮	5 actors	2015
Nominated for Best Supporting Actor and Best Actor in the same year	Andie Chen 陈邦鋆	5 actors	2017, 2024
Nominated for Best Supporting Actor and Best Actor in the same year	Brandon Wong 黄炯耀	5 actors	2023
Nominated for Best Newcomer/Rising Star and Best Actor in the same year	James Lye 赖兴祥	1 actor	1997
Received All-Time Favourite Artiste and won Best Actor in the same year	Tay Ping Hui 郑斌辉	2 actors	2012
Received All-Time Favourite Artiste and won Best Actor in the same year	Qi Yuwu 戚玉武	2 actors	2016

== Multiple awards and nominations ==
The following individuals received two or more Best Actor awards:

Wins	Actor	Nominations	Years won
7	Chen Hanwei 陈汉玮	16	2001, 2005, 2009, 2010, 2017, 2019, 2022
5	Xie Shaoguang 谢韶光	7	1996, 1998, 1999, 2003, 2004
3	Li Nanxing 李南星	10	1995, 2002, 2006
3	Christopher Lee 李铭顺	15	1997, 2013, 2025
3	Qi Yuwu 戚玉武	13	2011, 2016, 2021

The following individuals received two or more Best Actor nominations:

Nominations	Actor
16	Chen Hanwei 陈汉玮
15	Christopher Lee 李铭顺
13	Qi Yuwu 戚玉武
10	Li Nanxing 李南星
9	Tay Ping Hui 郑斌辉
8	Chew Chor Meng 周初明
7	Pierre Png 方展发
7	Xie Shaoguang 谢韶光
6	Terence Cao 曹国辉
6	Shaun Chen 陈泓宇
6	Desmond Tan 陈泂江
5	Romeo Tan 陈罗密欧
4	Huang Wenyong 黄文永
4	Andie Chen 陈邦鋆
4	Richie Koh 许瑞奇
3	Elvin Ng 黄俊雄
3	Adrian Pang 彭耀顺
2	Jeremy Chan 田铭耀
2	Edmund Chen 陈之财
2	Dai Xiangyu 戴向宇
2	Thomas Ong 王沺裁
2	Brandon Wong 黄炯耀
2	Zhang Yaodong 张耀栋
2	Zhang Zhenxuan 张振煊
2	Zheng Geping 郑各评
2	Xu Bin 徐彬
