= Phyllis Quek =

Singaporean actress (born 1972)

- Born: 23 August 1972 (age 54); Kuala Lumpur, Malaysia
- Occupations: Actress; singer; former model; host
- Years active: 1995–present
- Agent: Hype Records
- Spouse: David Cox (m. 2012)
- Musical career
- Genre: Mandopop
- Instrument: Vocals

Chinese name
- Traditional Chinese: 郭妃麗
- Simplified Chinese: 郭妃丽
- Hanyu Pinyin: Guō Fēilì
- Jyutping: Gwok3 Fei1 Lai6
- Hokkien POJ: Koeh Hui-lê
- Tâi-lô: Kueh Hui-lê

Phyllis Quek (born 23 August 1972) is a Malaysian actress and singer but continues to film on an ad-hoc basis and is currently managed by Hype Records.

Quek was a full-time Mediacorp artist from 1995 to 2001, and was ranked by local media as the 'Fourth Ah Jie' for being the fourth most prominent actress in Singapore's Chinese-language entertainment industry of that time after Zoe Tay, Fann Wong and Ann Kok. She is known for her lead roles in the film 2000AD co-starring Aaron Kwok, and as 'Bai Mudan' in the popular television series Legend of the Eight Immortals.

== Early life ==
Quek was born in Malaysia to a single–parent family and was raised by her grandmother. She moved to Singapore when she was seven to study. While studying, Quek stayed at her mother's relatives' homes, rotating among relatives every few months.

== Career ==
=== Rise to Prominence ===
In 1995, Quek participated in Mediacorp's Star Search and won third place in the talent show. She was subsequently cast in Beyond Dawn (女子监狱) for which she was awarded the Best Newcomer Award at MediaCorp's Star Awards in 1996.

Following her 'Best Newcomer' win, Quek emerged as one of the most popular actresses in Singapore's Chinese-language entertainment industry. Most notably, Quek starred as Bai Mudan in the popular television series Legend of the Eight Immortals. In recognition of her popularity, local media crowned her as the Fourth Ah Jie, after Zoe Tay, Fann Wong and Ann Kok

In 2000, Quek starred alongside Hong Kong actors Aaron Kwok and Daniel Wu in the movie, 2000 AD. Through this action film, she gained exposure in the Asian media industry and was featured in the book, Singapore Cinema by Raphaël Millet. Following this film, she performed as a supporting actress in a Raintree Pictures film, The Tree.

The recording of the theme song of her earlier drama, The Other Parent (妈妈先生) and Mind Games (危险人物) marked the beginning of her career as a singer. She then released her debut album, Phyllis, under Hype Records which contained primarily dance tracks and singles from the soundtrack of The Tree and Beyond The Axis Of Truth (法医X档案). Phyllis guest starred in Channel 5's crime drama series Heartlanders 2 where she played a stalked actress. Her song, 不知不觉, was featured in the series, and became a radio hit along with her other single, Freedom. However, the album did not mark the start of a longstanding music career for Phyllis and it was to remain her first and only album.

Quek's contract with Mediacorp expired in 2001. In an interview, Quek said that she did not renew due to health reasons. She would later signed with Hype Records Artiste Networks.

=== Venture Overseas ===
After joining Hype Records, Quek set her sights on expanding her career regionally. She made her debut in Taiwan headlining the idol drama My Fair Lady (丑女大翻身), in which she donned prosthetics to play an overweighed woman.

Throughout the 2000s, Quek starred in many regional productions from Taiwan and mainland China, including portraying the role of Yin Susu in The Heaven Sword and Dragon Saber co-starring Alec Su and Alyssa Chia.

In 2009, Quek garnered recognition for her performance in Perfect Cut II. She was cast alongside Christopher Lee as the female lead in the film Kidnapper (2010).

During this period, Quek won seven Star Awards for Top 10 Most Popular Female Artistes.

=== Return to entertainment industry ===
After marrying Australian businessman David Cox in December 2012, Quek took a hiatus from showbiz.

After a seven-year absence from acting, Quek made her return in the 2017 drama Legal Eagles, portraying the role of an unscrupulous middle-aged businesswoman, Fang Hai Lun.

Since then, Quek has occasionally taken on acting roles in Singapore, appearing in supporting roles in dramas like Soul Detective and My One and Only.

=== Endorsement ===
Quek's first major endorsement deal was for Japan's Bigen Prominous hair dye in 2001. In December 2003, she was announced as Marie France Bodyline's spokesperson.

== Personal life ==
Quek married Australian businessman David Cox in December 2012.

== Filmography ==
=== Film ===
Year	Title	Role	Notes	Ref
1996	Ace Cops 妙警点三八			
1997	Hope 人间有梦			
2000	2000 AD			
2000	Born Wild 野兽之瞳			
2001	The Tree			
2003	Good Luck 齐鸣大吉			
2009	Autumn In March	Lee Siqin		
2010	Kidnapper			
2011	The Ultimate Winner	Zhang Zhifang		

=== Television series ===
Year	Title	Role	Notes	Ref
1996	Beyond Dawn 女子监狱			
1996	Marriage, Dollars & Sense 5C 老公			
1996	Brave New World 新阿郎			
1997	Longing 悲情年代			
1997	Crimes and Tribulations - Price Of Passion 狮城奇案录之俪人巧骗			
1997	My Wife, Your Wife, Their Wives 101老婆之99朵玫瑰			
1997	The Other Parent 妈妈先生			
1997	From The Medical Files 医生档案			
1997	Dreams - Miss Freckles 七个梦			
1998	Mind Games 危险人物			
1998	The New Adventures of Wisely			
1998	Legend of the Eight Immortals	Bai Mudan		
1999	Lost Souls 另类佳人			
1999	PI Blues 乌龙档案			
1999	From The Medical Files 2 医生档案2			
2000	On The Frontline 穿梭生死线			
2000	The Invincible Squad 迷幻特警			
2000	Adam's Company 亚当周记			
2001	Devil's Blue 叛逆战队			
2001	My Fair Lady 丑女大翻身			
2001	The Hotel			
2002	Sonic Youth 极速青春			
2003	The Heaven Sword and Dragon Saber	Yin Susu		
2003	Palm Of Rulai 新如來神掌			
2003	True Heroes			
2003	A Child's Hope 孩有明天			
2003	Carry Me Fly And Walk Off 带我飞 带我走			
2003	When The Time Comes 一线之间			
2004	Love Contract 爱情和约			
2004	Man At Forty 跑吧,男人!			
2004	Lover Of Herb 香草恋人馆			
2005	The Scarlet Kid 红孩儿			
2005	The Little Fairy			
2005	Angel Lover 天使情人			
2006	Rhapsody In Blue			
2007	Live Again			
2007	City Fables - Daybreak 都市寓言之一日情			
2008	Addicted To Love 都市恋人的追逐			
2009	Perfect Cut II			
2010	The Best Things in Life			
2011	The Ultimate Winner	Zhang Zhifang		
2017	Legal Eagles	Fang Hailun		
2017	My Teacher Is a Thug	Lian Jiaxuan		
2022	Soul Detective	Yu Jiachun		
2023	My One and Only	He Yurou		

=== Hosting ===
- 2009: Fashion Asia 亚洲时尚风 (Seoul)
- 2010: Citispa Beauty Perfection 2010 Citispa完美大挑战2010

== Discography ==
=== Singles ===
Album	Track	Song title	Television series	Theme
阳光系列2	4	只要你肯尝试	薯条 汉堡 青春豆	Main Theme
阳光系列2	8	无价之宝	妈妈先生	Main Theme
阳光系列3	6	但愿	卫斯理传奇	Sub Theme
阳光系列3	10	宁愿你平凡	危险人物	Main Theme
阳光系列4	1	不能没有爱	穿梭生死线	Main Theme
阳光系列6	1	分享	大酒店	Main Theme
阳光系列6	4	仿佛	大酒店	Sub Theme
阳光系列6	11	Freedom / 不想说 Remix		
阳光系列7	11	好天气	孩有明天	Sub Theme
Phyllis	1	Freedom		
Phyllis	2	没心情	孩子树	Sub Theme
Phyllis	3	Limit Of My Heart		
Phyllis	4	着迷	迷幻特警	Sub Theme
Phyllis	5	阵雨		
Phyllis	6	失去	孩子树	Main Theme
Phyllis	7	Enjoy		
Phyllis	8	不想说	法医X档案	Main Theme
Phyllis	9	不知不觉	Heartlanders 2	Sub Theme
Phyllis	10	睡美人	法医X档案	Sub Theme
Phyllis	11	Daze	孩子树	Sub Theme
骏马奔腾庆丰年	1	气势如虹		
骏马奔腾庆丰年	2	大旺年		
骏马奔腾庆丰年	3	8方吉祥样样红		
骏马奔腾庆丰年	4	招财进宝 + 财神到		
骏马奔腾庆丰年	5	大地回春 + 除夕合家欢 + 恭喜恭喜 + 恭喜发财		
骏马奔腾庆丰年	6	挂红灯 + 挂彩灯		
骏马奔腾庆丰年	7	新年团聚		
骏马奔腾庆丰年	8	春暖花开喜洋洋		
骏马奔腾庆丰年	9	拜年		
骏马奔腾庆丰年	10	十二生肖走一回		
骏马奔腾庆丰年	11	过个快乐年		
骏马奔腾庆丰年	12	大拜年 + 拜天公 + 庆元宵		
肥羊肥年	1	年年丰收好		
肥羊肥年	2	肥羊肥年		
肥羊肥年	4	同欢共乐		
肥羊肥年	5	五大财神迎春来		
肥羊肥年	6	春之晨		
肥羊肥年	9	挂红灯 + 挂彩灯		
肥羊肥年	11	富贵年年福星照: 齐唱新年好 + 大年初一头一天 + 新春大吉 + 富贵年 + 齐唱新年好		
肥羊肥年	12	恭喜恭喜贺新年		
An Evening With The Stars	2	Freedom		
An Evening With The Stars	6	不想说	法医X档案	Main Theme
Unreleased	-	疑惑	迷幻特警	Main Theme
Unreleased	-	每一天的思念	真心英雄	Sub Theme

== Awards and nominations ==
Year	Award	Category	Nominated work	Result	Ref
1996	Star Awards	Best Newcomer	—N/a	Won	
1997	Star Awards	Top 10 Most Popular Female Artistes	—N/a	Won	
1998	Star Awards	Top 10 Most Popular Female Artistes	—N/a	Won	
1999	Star Awards	Top 10 Most Popular Female Artistes	—N/a	Nominated	
2000	Star Awards	Top 10 Most Popular Female Artistes	—N/a	Won	
2001	Star Awards	Top 10 Most Popular Female Artistes	—N/a	Won	
2002	Star Awards	Top 10 Most Popular Female Artistes	—N/a	Won	
2003	Star Awards	Top 10 Most Popular Female Artistes	—N/a	Won	
2004	Star Awards	Top 10 Most Popular Female Artistes	—N/a	Won	
