= Chloe Wang =

Chloe Wang may refer to:

- Chloe Bennet (Chloe Wang, born 1992), American actress and singer
- Chloe Wang (Taiwanese actress) (born 1986), Taiwanese actress, singer and host
