= Million Dollar Money Drop: Singapore Edition =

- Genre: Game show
- Developed by: Endemol
- Presented by: George Young
- Country of origin: Singapore
- Original language: English
- No. of seasons: 1
- No. of episodes: 13 episodes

Production
- Executive producers: Jennifer Gwee; Rahmat Samad
- Production location: Mediacorp Caldecott Broadcast Centre
- Running time: 60 minutes (including adverts)

Original release
- Network: MediaCorp Channel 5
- Release: 9 August – 2 November 2011

Related
- The Million Pound Drop Live; Million Dollar Money Drop

Million Dollar Money Drop: Singapore Edition was a game show which aired on MediaCorp Channel 5 in the Singapore. It was based on the UK series The Million Pound Drop Live. However, unlike the original UK version, it was not broadcast live, and there were several changes to the format. The show premiered on 9 August 2011, after the nation's 46th National Day Parade segment, and is hosted by George Young. The show's set, theme song and question cues was followed based on the British edition. About 300,000 people watched the premiere of the show: approximately 6% of the total population of Singapore at that time.

== Game format ==
A team of two people with a pre-existing relationship is presented with SGD$1,000,000 in denominations of $50 in bundles of $25,000 (40 bundles = $1,000,000). The team must risk the entire amount on each correctly of eight multiple-choice questions.

For each question, the contestants choose one of two categories, then indicate which answer(s) they wish to risk their money on by moving the bundles of cash onto a row of trap doors, termed "drops," each of which corresponds to one answer. However, they must always keep at least one drop "clear" with no money on it. In addition, all eight questions have a time limit; any money that is not placed on an answer when time runs out will be lost.

Once the money is in place, the trap doors for the incorrect answers are opened, and the cash on them falls out of sight and is lost. The contestants then continue the game using the cash they had placed on the correct answer. They get to keep whatever money is left after the eighth question; if they lose everything before reaching this point, the game ends immediately and they leave with nothing.

Question(s)	Answer choices	Time limit
1–4	4	60 seconds
5–7	3	60 seconds
8	2	60 seconds

== Contestants and their winnings ==
Episode No	Contestants	Date Premièred	Total Money Won	Question Where All Money Was Lost
1	Eugene & Izam; Amelia & Marianne	9 August 2011	Eugene & Izam – $0 Amelia & Marianne – $25,000 remaining after 5 questions	Eugene & Izam – 1st question ($1 million lost)
2	Amelia & Marianne; Sean & Shu Ming; Krystle & Cheryl	17 August 2011	Amelia & Marianne – $0 Sean & Shu Ming – $0 Krystle & Cheryl – $525,000 remaining after 2 questions	Amelia & Marianne – 7th question ($25,000 lost) Sean & Shu Ming – 3rd question ($1 million lost)
3	Krystle & Cheryl; Sheedah & Maznah	24 August 2011	Krystle & Cheryl – $0 Sheedah & Maznah – $0	Krystle & Cheryl – 5th question ($150,000 lost) Sheedah & Maznah – 4th question ($50,000 lost)
4	Chua Enlai & Sebastian Tan^{1} Justin Ang & Vernon A^{1}	31 August 2011	Enlai & Sebastian – $0 **Justin & Vernon – $75,000**	Enlai & Sebastian – 6th question ($50,000 lost)
5	Juliana & Willy	7 September 2011	**Juliana & Willy – $25,000**	–
6	Greg & Coral; Clifford & Sharma	14 September 2011	Greg & Coral – $0 Clifford & Sharma – $100,000 remaining after 3 questions	Greg & Coral – 4th question ($50,000 lost)
7	Clifford & Sharma; Weiwen & Jeremiah	21 September 2011	Clifford & Sharma – $0 Weiwen & Jeremiah – $75,000 remaining after 4 questions	Clifford and Sharma – 6th question ($50,000 lost)
8	Weiwen & Jeremiah; Ratna & Del; Doris & San	28 September 2011	Weiwen & Jeremiah – $0 Ratna & Del – $0 Doris & San – $325,000 remaining after 2 questions	Weiwen & Jeremiah – 6th question ($25,000 lost); Ratna & Del – 4th question ($25,000 lost)
9	Doris & San; Shahlan & Shahreel	5 October 2011	Doris & San – $0 Shahlan & Shahreel – $75,000 remaining after 5 questions	Doris & San – 4th question ($200,000 lost)
10	Shahlan & Shahreel; Li Qi & Xin	12 October 2011	**Shahlan & Shahreel – $50,000** Li Qi & Xin – $50,000 remaining after 5 questions	–
11	Li Qi & Xin; Li Heng & Jocelyn; DJ (Ng Ding Jie) & Lai Yinzuo	19 October 2011	**Li Qi & Xin – $25,000** Li Heng & Jocelyn – $0; DJ & Yinzuo – $750,000 remaining after 1 question	Li Heng & Jocelyn – 3rd question ($75,000 lost)
12	DJ (Ng Ding Jie) & Lai Yinzuo; Erwin & Jasmine; Linda & Leonie	26 October 2011	DJ & Yinzuo – $0 Erwin & Jasmine – $0; Linda & Leonie – $0	DJ & Yinzuo – 5th Question ($50,000 lost) Erwin & Jasmine – 2nd Question ($50,000 lost); Linda & Leonie – 2nd Question ($750,000 lost)
13	Joanne Peh & Bobby Tonelli^{1}	2 November 2011	Joanne & Bobby – $0	Joanne & Bobby – 6th Question ($75,000 lost)

^1 These players played for charity. Bold denotes the winning pair

All statistics are accurate as of Season 1.

- Most money won: $75,000 (Justin & Vernon)
- Total winnings to date: $175,000
- Total amount of money dropped: $19,825,000
- Average amount of money dropped per contestant pair: $991,250.00
- Average amount of money dropped per question: $198,250.00
- Average amount of money dropped per episode: $1,525,000
- Total number of winners: 4
- Total number of contestants who lost everything: 16
- Total number of contestants who appeared on the show: 20
- Success rate: 20%
- Average winnings per winning contestant pair: $43,750
- Average winnings per episode to date: $13,461.54
- Average winnings per contestant pair to date: $8,750.00
- Longest $1 million remained in play: 3 questions (Sean & Shu Ming, Justin & Vernon, Li Qi & Xin)
- Most money lost in one question: $1 million (Eugene & Izam, Sean & Shu Ming)
- Most money lost in first question: $1 million (Eugene & Izam)
- Most money lost through one drop: $1 million (Sean & Shu Ming)
- Number of questions played so far: 100
- Number of questions answered correctly: 84
- Number of questions answered incorrectly: 16
- Average number of questions answered correctly: 4.20
- Most questions answered correctly: 8 (Justin & Vernon, Juliana & Willy, Shahlan & Shahreel, Li Qi & Xin)
- Least questions answered correctly: 0 (Eugene & Izam)

== See also ==
- The Million Pound Drop Live
- Million Dollar Money Drop
