= JJ Yosh =

American adventure filmmaker

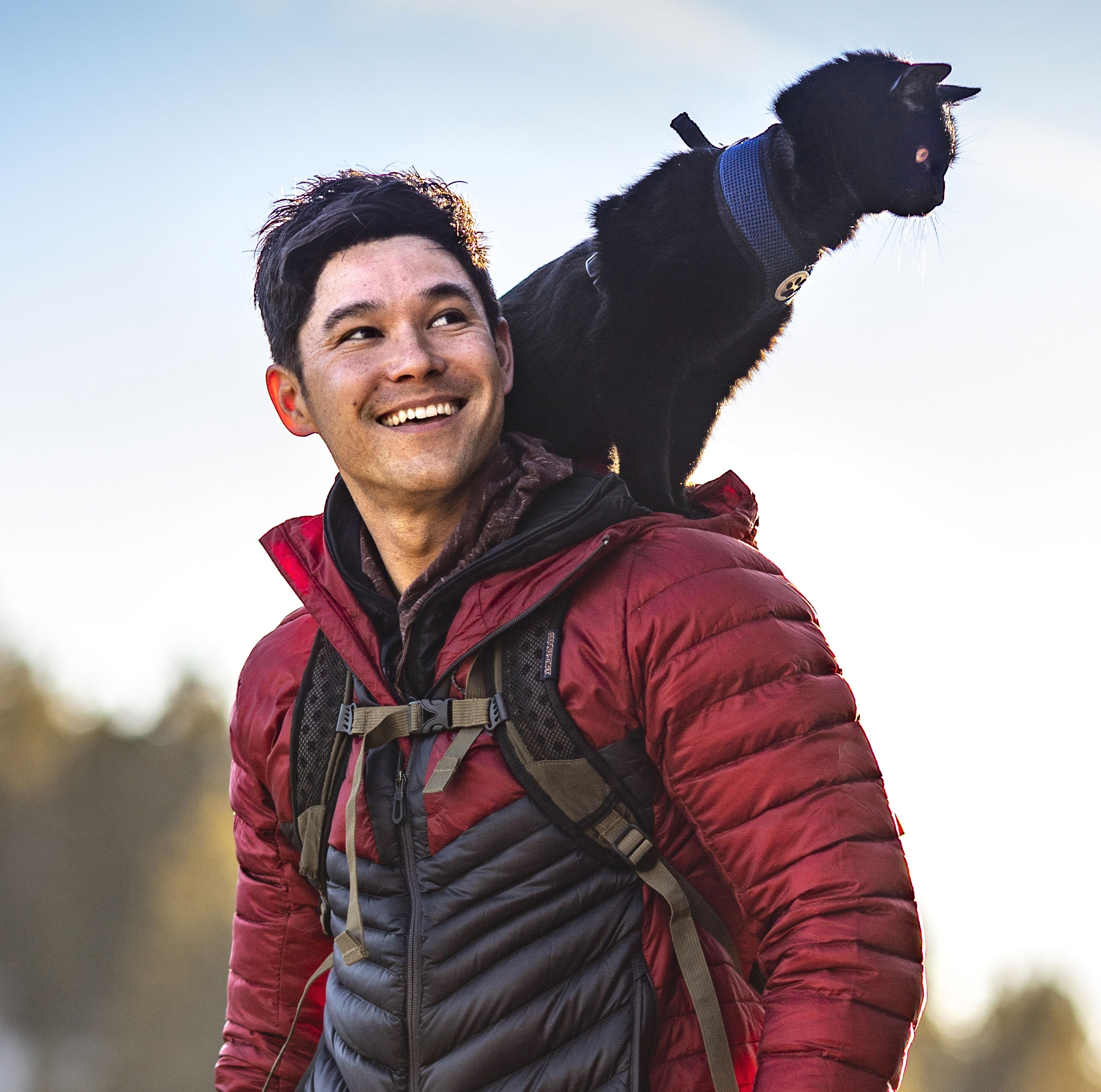
- JJ Yosh and Simon in 2020

J.J. Yosh is an American adventure filmmaker and social media personality based in Boulder, Colorado. He is known for outdoor videos made with his cat Simon, who has a large following on Instagram and TikTok under the name "Backpacking Kitty".

== Career ==
Yosh runs a production company, Higher Earth, which produces branded content for outdoor, technology, food and pet companies.

A 2020 Business Insider report on Yosh and Simon said sponsored-video packages started at around $10,000 and could reach $60,000, and noted brand work with companies including Procter & Gamble, Intuit and Petco.

In 2016 Yosh appeared as a guest presenter on the Discovery TLC Asia travel series Fun Taiwan, as part of a Taiwan Tourism Bureau campaign featuring international vloggers.

== Simon the Backpacking Kitty ==
Yosh adopted Simon, a black Bombay cat, in Boulder in 2016. The kitten came from a neighbour who had rescued a litter that was otherwise going to be euthanised.

Because Simon rode on Yosh's shoulders and backpack when tired on hikes, the pair became known as "Backpacking Kitty".

The two have hiked, kayaked, rock climbed, paddleboarded, mountain biked, skied, sailed and camped together across the United States. Yosh has described Simon as his "soulmate and my guardian angel".

By early 2020 the pair had a combined following of about 2.8 million across Instagram and TikTok, with Simon's TikTok account reaching roughly 2.1 million followers within about six months of launching.

In 2018 Simon appeared in a Kansas tourism film, which was covered by The Wichita Eagle.

They have been featured by Good Morning America and the Today show, and in People.

They have also been covered internationally: the South China Morning Post profiled the pair in a 2019 feature on adventure cats, and the Italian edition of Vanity Fair covered Simon in 2018.

== Recognition ==
Yosh and Simon appeared in Westword's 2019 list of Colorado Instagram influencers, in a 5280 feature on local animal Instagram accounts, and in a Denver Post roundup of adventurous Colorado pets.
