= Janet Hsieh =

Taiwanese-American television host (born 1980)

- 謝怡芬
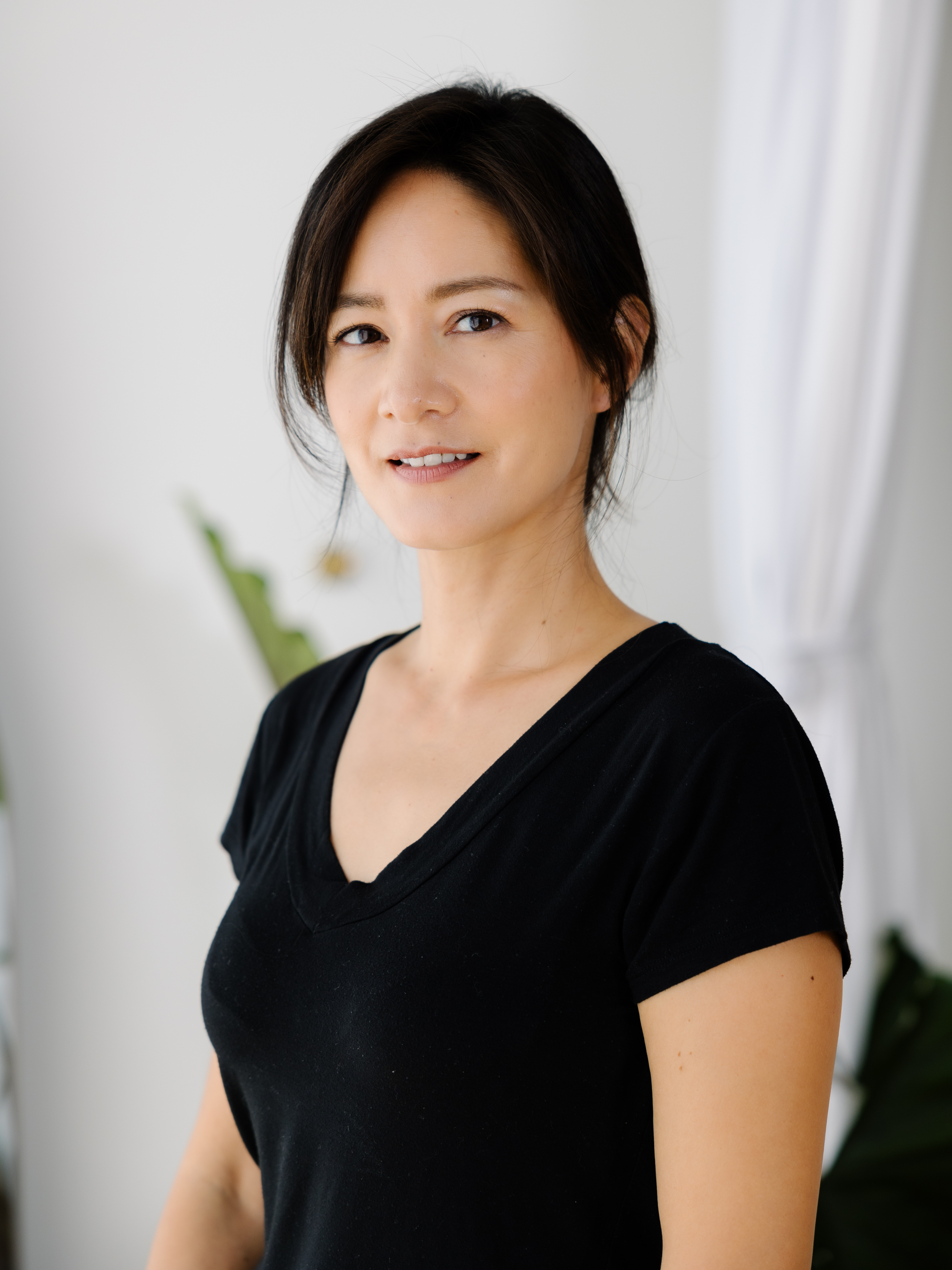
- Hsieh in 2023
- Born: Janet Josephine Hsieh; January 20, 1980 (age 46); Houston, Texas, U.S.
- Education: Massachusetts Institute of Technology (BS)
- Occupations: Host; model; violinist
- Years active: 2002–present
- Spouse: George Young (m. 2015)
- Children: 2

Chinese name
- Traditional Chinese: 謝怡芬
- Simplified Chinese: 谢怡芬
- Hanyu Pinyin: Xiè Yífēn
- Wade–Giles: Hsieh4 I2 Fen1
- Hokkien POJ: Siā î-Hun

Janet Josephine Hsieh (Chinese: 謝怡芬; pinyin: Xiè Yífēn; born January 20, 1980) is a Taiwanese-American television personality, model, and violinist based in Taipei, Taiwan. She is the host of the Discovery Travel and Living Channel's long-running series Fun Taiwan. The program is currently in its 16th season and has expanded to include Fun Asia, Fun Taiwan Challenge, Fun Taiwan All Stars, and Aquachallenge. She has been nominated four times and won once for the Taiwanese Golden Bell Awards as Best Host of a Travel Program, and once for Best Host of a Variety Program.

== Early life and education ==
Hsieh was born to a Taiwanese American family on January 20, 1980, in Houston, Texas, where she was raised. She has one elder sister. Her father is from Kaohsiung, Taiwan, and her mother is from Taipei; both of her parents moved from Taipei to Texas to attend university there. Growing up, Hsieh spoke Taiwanese Hokkien and English at home. She began playing the violin as a child and performed at the White House for U.S. president George H. W. Bush.

After graduating from Bellaire Senior High School in 1997, Hsieh attended the Massachusetts Institute of Technology (MIT) and graduated from MIT in 2001 with a Bachelor of Science degree in biology and Spanish. During her time at MIT, she was a member of the Alpha Chi Omega women's fraternity, a member of the college rowing team, and served on the university's Ring Committee, the group responsible for designing the MIT class ring. She also ran the Boston Marathon during this time.

== Career ==
=== Volunteer and EMT ===
After graduation from college, Hsieh spent time in Jamshedpur as a community outreach volunteer with Tata Steel Rural Development Society (TSRDS) and enrolled in medical school at the University of Texas at San Antonio, although she ultimately decided to leave the school. She also received certification as an EMT from Boston EMS/MIT, and in September 2001 went to Taiwan for a medical residential internship, where she completed a six-month stint at Taipei Veterans General Hospital in Tienmu.

=== Modeling ===
In 2002, at the end of her medical internship, Hsieh met Jeff Huang of the Taiwanese rap group L.A. Boyz outside the popular Taipei nightclub, Room 18. On recommendations from Huang, Hsieh landed an underwear commercial and modeling contract soon after.

=== Television ===
In 2005, Hsieh auditioned for a new Discovery Travel and Living television series exploring the island of Taiwan, entitled Fun Taiwan. Since landing the role, she has been nominated four times for Best Host in a Travel Program at the Golden Bell Awards, achieving a win in 2011, and has been one of the longest running series on Discovery Channel's TLC (Asia).

=== Music ===
Hsieh learned to play the violin at age five and was part of the Texas Young Virtuosos, who played at the White House for President George Bush and in Europe. In Taiwan, she has performed three concerts at the National Concert Hall, twice in 2011 and again in 2013. She also played as one of 4,645 participants at Changhua Stadium in 2011, joining Changhua County youth to set a Guinness World Record for "Largest Violin Ensemble."

=== Author ===
Hsieh published her first Chinese-language travel book, Traveling with 100 Toothbrushes, in 2010. She has since published two additional travel-related titles, Backpack to the Future and Au for You, as well as two English learning books, Janet's Funtastic English and j@net.com.

In 2016, Hsieh and her husband George Young co-authored the book Starting at The End (Chinese language title: "在世界的盡頭說：我願意"). The book shares their sometimes conflicting stories on how they met, as well as their fifty-day journey through Texas, Argentina, and through to their wedding in Antarctica.

== Personal life ==
Hsieh married George Young in January 2015. They have two sons, one born in 2016 and the other in 2021.

Hsieh achieved a black belt in Taekwondo and trained as a sushi chef and circus performer in the past.

== Filmography ==
=== Hosting ===
Hsieh has served as the host of numerous programs on Discovery Travel and Living, including Fun Taiwan, as well as programs on local Taiwanese television networks, such as Aqua Challenge.

=== Acting ===
Year	Title	Role	Notes	Ref.
2013	Frozen	Anna (Taiwanese Dub)	Animated Film	
2015	Constellation Women: Aries	Chen Yin-Hsiu	TV Series; 10 episodes	
2017	High 5 Basketball	Lin Chia-Lu	TV Series; 13 episodes	
2018	A Bread Factory Part One	May	Film	
2018	A Bread Factory Part Two	May	Film	
2018	20 Zhi Hou	Wei Han-Jen	TV Series;	
2019	Big Three Dragons	Hotel Manager	Film	
2019	Mechanical Souls	Ah-hui	Film	
2019	Deja Vu	Janet	TV Series; 1 episode	
2020	Adventure of the Ring		TV Series; 1 episode	
2020	The Ghost Bride	Hsiao Yu	TV Series; 4 episodes	
2021	Shen Chin Hsiang	Yeh Yun	TV Series; 6 episodes	
2021	Malignant	Nurse J D Marco		
2023	Love in Taipei	Aunt Claire		
2024	Weekend in Taipei	Woman in Bathroom		
2025	Zero Day Attack	Mayor of Taipei		

=== Music video appearances ===
- Sneezing by Yen-j (2012)
- 3 Idiots by Mayday (2011)
- What's Wrong with Rock?! by Leehom Wang (2008)
- Setting You Free by Nicky Lee (2005)
