= The Brian Jackson Show =

British Internet show

- Created by: Mark Marlow
- Starring: Pietro Herrera; Jamie McMillan; George Young (actor); Gemma Harvey
- Country of origin: United Kingdom
- No. of seasons: 1
- No. of episodes: 6

Production
- Executive producers: Mark Marlow; Nick Graves (Season 1)
- Production location: Bristol
- Running time: 29 minutes
- Production company: Schadenfreude Pictures

Original release
- Release: 14 March 2009

The Brian Jackson Show is an exclusively online show that follows shows such as lonelygirl15 and Kate Modern as examples of the growing number of internet sitcoms and shows that are being broadcast exclusively online. Its broadcasts are aired as full TV-length episodic content.

Even though the show received positive reviews, it was not continued after the first season ended.

The Brian Jackson Show aired its first episode on 14 March 2009.

== Overview ==
The Brian Jackson Show is written and directed by Mark Marlow.

The show has its own Facebook page

"The eponymous Brian Jackson is a man that thinks the unthinkable and simply runs with it.

The Brian Jackson Show is a fresh and innovative new sitcom, that [is] exclusively available ONLINE.

A comedy aimed at those who secretly wish they could live life by their own set of rules, oblivious to the chaos around the corner.

Spread over six intricately structured episodes, writer and director Mark Marlow invites audiences to enter the world of Brian Jackson and his three housemates. Robin Donald is Brian's wing man, or put more accurately, his patsy. The house is owned by Tony, Robin's stepbrother, who has recently thrown a curve ball at the house dynamics; a woman. Cringe and cry with laughter as Robin, Tony, and his girlfriend Crystal are swept away by the whirlwind that is Brian Jackson. False Limbs; assisted suicide; dog knapping; and illegal pornography...taboo has lost all meaning."

=== Main characters ===
- Brian Jackson (Pietro Herrera)
- Robin Donald (Jamie McMillan)
- Tony Donald (George Young)
- Crystal Kiltgaard (Gemma Harvey)

== Reviews ==
One reviewer described an episode as "29:58 of sheer joy to be watched repeatedly":

Of late, England has produced series after series of awkward yet intelligently goofy sitcoms that Hollywood inevitably cannibalizes. The web series The Brian Jackson Show is firmly of this tradition.
