= Uğur Rıfat Karlova =

Taiwan Artist

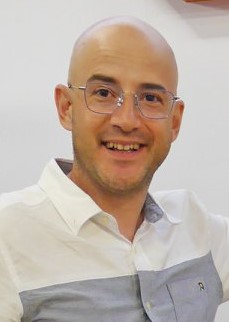
- Ugur Rifat Karlova
- Born: August 2, 1980 (age 46); Izmit, Kocaeli, Turkey
- Other names: Richie, Wu Feng

Comedy career
- Years active: 2006–present
- Medium: stand-up, film, television
- Genres: observational comedy, wit, satire
- Subjects: Turkish popular culture, culture clash, everyday life, foreigners, human behavior

Chinese name
- Traditional Chinese: 吳鳳
- Simplified Chinese: 吴凤
Transcriptions
Standard Mandarin
- Hanyu Pinyin: Wú Fèng

Alternative Chinese name
- Traditional Chinese: 吳承鳳
- Simplified Chinese: 吴承凤
Transcriptions
Standard Mandarin
- Hanyu Pinyin: Wú Chéngfèng

Uğur Rıfat Karlova (Chinese: 吳鳳; pinyin: Wú Fèng; born August 2, 1980) is a Turkish-Taiwanese stand-up comedian, actor, TV host, showman, and writer.

== Biography ==
Born in Izmit, Karlova's family origins go back to the city of Karlová. He attended primary school in his father's city of Hayrabolu in Tekirdağ Province. Following that, his father sent him to Private Tekirdag College which was the first English private school in Tekirdag. After graduation, he continued his studies at the Tekirdag Tourism Profession High School.

In 1998, he graduated from this school's Department of Accounting and Reception and in the same year he enrolled at the University of Mersin's Vocational School of Anamur in the Department of Hotel Management in German Language. Karlova got his degree in 2001 and in 2002 he entered Ankara University's Department of Chinese/Sinology, graduating in 2006.

In 2006, he received a scholarship to study in Taiwan. Karlova received his master's degree in the Department of Political Science at National Taiwan Normal University. Karlova speaks fluent German, Mandarin and Turkish, and has some level of proficiency in English and Taiwanese. He also completed script writing and acting courses from universities in Taiwan including Chinese Culture University and Taipei National University of Arts. Karlova is currently studying and developing his entertainment career in Taiwan. He became naturalized as a Taiwanese citizen in 2018.

== Television and stage career ==
Karlova's television career started in Taiwan with a documentary movie named The History of Taiwan People in 2006. The producers saw him on the street and invited him for their film castings. Karlova was selected for the role of George Leslie Mackay, who was a dentist and missionary in 19th century Taiwan. FHM took Karlova's pictures for Taiwan's FHM August 2008 issue in Eclipse commercial. The 22-episode TV series Faysal Agabey began in 2008 and Karlova did his first TV series appearance as good-hearted engineer Alaeddin who worked for survivors of the 1999 Golcuk earthquake in Turkey. This was the most expensive production of Taiwan's Buddhist channel 'Great Love TV' and nominated best drama in Seoul Drama Awards 2009. Karlova continued his commercial appearances in Te Quiero Diamond Watches, Taipei City Tourism Introduction, Nissan, Fubon Bank, Gigabyte and Ocean Spray TV advertisements. Karlova has appeared one of the most famous TV shows in Taiwan with many television celebrities such as Li Jing's Zhuang Shı Ye Zong Hui talent show, Daxüe Sheng Le Mei the university talk show and with Taiwan television celebrities Aken, Nado and Taozı. Karlova is known for his Aaron Kwok and Stanley Huang imitations. These imitations were the first shows by a foreign entertainer in Taiwan. Karlova is using the stage name Wu Feng in Taiwan. He has taken acting and script writing classes from Taipei University of Arts. Karlova's another TV drama is for Hakka TV, The Pioneers. This is one of the biggest TV dramas of Hakka TV in Taiwan. In Hakka TV drama Karlova acts as a foreign researcher with another famous foreign actor and director Brook Hall. Karlova's third TV drama role was a father in Taiwan's popular TV drama The Perfect Man which got high audience ratings and become Taiwan's one of the most popular drama in 2011. In this TV drama he was worked with famous artist such as Tian Xin and Yang Yi Zhan. The Perfect Man has helped Karlova to raise his popularity among Taiwan audience. Karlova's first movie appearance is the movie Black and White as a foreign anchorman. Karlova also hosted a TV program for Taiwan's public television PTS. The name of the program is Jian Kang Suo Cha Dui, in this program Karlova has visited many hospitals and introduced many new developments on health technology.

In 2011, Karlova started hosting the travel program iWalker, for which he won a hosting award at the 47th Golden Bell Awards in 2012, a first for a foreign citizen.

== Stand up comedy ==
Karlova started his single stage performances at the Comedy Club Taipei which used to be the sole comedy club in Taiwan. He has performed more than 100 shows in the Mandarin Chinese language. He is one of the first foreigners to perform in the Chinese language in Taiwan and the world. He performs his live shows barefoot. He explains, "performing barefoot is amazing – it helps me to feel the wooden stage and I really can be part of it." He is currently performing at the Comedy Club and for special events. Karlova also performed in Hong Kong at Take Out Comedy Club and got the 2. title in 2010 Hong Kong International Stand Up Comedy Contest.

=== TV and stage appearances ===
- The History of Taiwan People as George Leslie Mackay.
- 3M Table Light TV commercial as the green genie.
- Te Quiero diamond watches as a fashion designer.
- TV series- Faysal Agabey – as engineer Alaeddin (4 episodes).
- Nissan TV commercial as the green foreigner.
- Gigabyte commercial as a young office worker.
- Daxue Sheng Le Mei – The university talk show.
- Zhuang Shı Ye Zong Hui – Talent show as Aaron Kwok imitation.
- Fell in Love with Taiwan- Travel program. Host (1 episode)
- Halin Teacher Hi – Entertainment show, as himself.
- Hayrabolu Sunflower Festival – Host.
- Oylum Talu ile Burası Haftasonu, live morning program, HaberTurk – Special Guest.
- Gümüş Hilal, culture and art program, TRT Turk – Special Guest.
- Momotai Shopping Channel PONPIE Popcorn Commercial as American guy.
- Microsoft BING Search Portal Commercial for USA, as Cook in the Japanese restaurant.
- Guo Min Da Hui- Talk show. As Himself- About Education in Taiwan and Turkey.
- Jiu Shı Ai Ba Mei-Guest.
- Niu Dan Kuai Pao- Donation Gameshow-Host.(1 episode)
- Jin Wan Nali You Wenti- Talk Show, as foreign artist and showman in Taiwan.
- TV Series- Yuan- The Pioneers Hakka TV drama as foreign researcher Locke.
- Ocean Spray TV commercial as the young farmer.
- Fun Taiwan travel show, special guest.
- Martens Beer TV commercial as the barman.
- Yes Water TV commercial as referee.
- Jian Kang Suo Cha Dui. Host.
- Taiwan Quan Ji Lu. Host.
- Xia Yi Zhan Taiwan. Host.
