= George Young (actor) =

English actor, host and writer (born 1980)

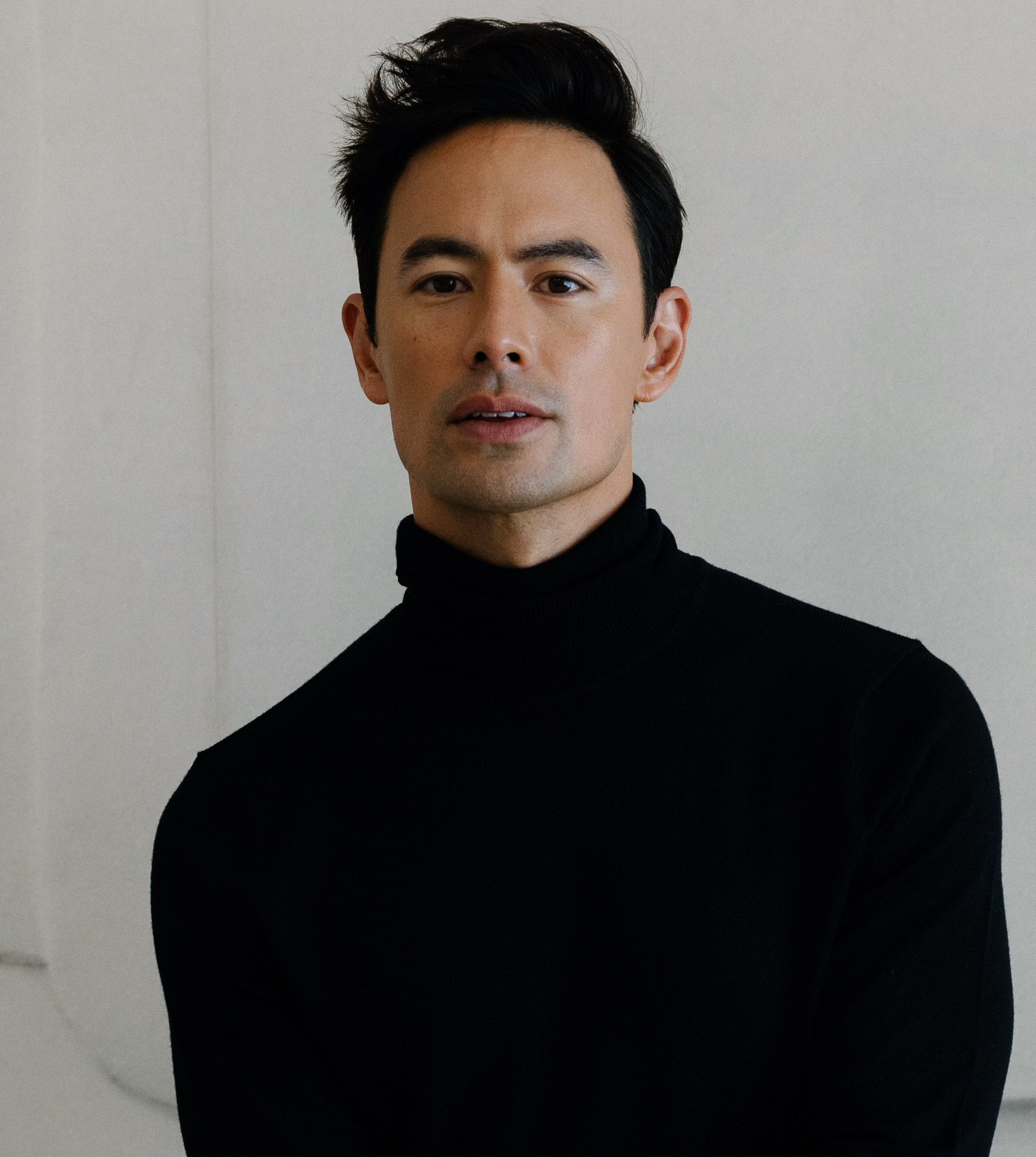
- Born: George Ng; 29 February 1980 (age 46); London, England
- Education: University of Southampton; University of Westminster; University of Law
- Occupations: Actor; presenter; writer
- Years active: 2004–present
- Spouse: Janet Hsieh (m. 2015)
- Children: 2

George Ng
- Traditional Chinese: 吳宇衞
- Simplified Chinese: 吴宇卫
- Hanyu Pinyin: Wú Yǔwèi

George Young (born George Ng; 29 February 1980) is an English actor, writer, and television presenter known for roles in Malignant (2021), Falling for Christmas (2022), and The Strangers film series.

== Early life and education ==
The eldest of four brothers, Young was born on Leap Day 1980 in London, England to a Malaysian Chinese father and Greek Cypriot mother. He was educated at Winchester College and studied acting in New York before receiving his degree in psychology from the University of Southampton, and then a law degree at the University of Westminster and The College of Law.

Although Young completed his solicitor traineeship in the City of London law firm, and is a fully qualified solicitor for the Supreme Court of England and Wales, he gave this up to pursue his love of acting.

== Career ==
Young began his career in entertainment in the United Kingdom, appearing in BBC's Casualty and subsequently filming his first feature role in the Bollywood film Jhootha Hi Sahi.

After filming several TV commercials in Taiwan and Thailand, and a music video with Ariel Lin, Young made an appearance on TLC, taking a guest co-hosting spot alongside Janet Hsieh on the show Fun Taiwan. He has subsequently been credited as a script writer for the show.

In 2011, Young hosted Million Dollar Money Drop: Singapore Edition which premiered on National Day on MediaCorp Channel 5. Both the show and Young trended worldwide on Twitter shortly after the show first aired.

In the same year, Young starred in the second installment of The Pupil as new pupil Benjamin Wong. The season premiered on 18 August 2011.

After studying Mandarin for less than a year, Young filmed two Mediacorp Mandarin-language dramas concurrently: Yours Fatefully and Joys of Life, for MediaCorp Channel 8.

In 2015, Young landed his first US television series, playing Dr Victor Cannerts, a series regular role in the show Containment. The show premiered in the US on 19 April 2016 on The CW.

In 2016, Young and his wife Janet Hsieh co-authored the book "Starting at The End" (Chinese language title: "在世界的盡頭說：我願意"). The book shares their occasionally conflicting stories on how they met, as well as their fifty-day journey through Texas, Argentina, and their wedding in Antarctica.

In 2018, Young wrote, directed, and starred alongside his wife Janet Hsieh in a short film on autism titled Home. During its festival run, Home was nominated for Best Picture at the 2018 Los Angeles Film Awards, and won Best Actor in an Indie Film and Best Duo for Young and Hsieh, respectively. In the 2018 Best Shorts Festival, Young received the Humanitarian Award of Distinction and the Award of Excellence for Disability Issues for the film, as well as Best Actor and Actress awards for Young and Hsieh respectively. Home has since been distributed on Amazon.

In 2019, Young joined James Wan's film Malignant as the male lead, Detective Kekoa Shaw. The film was released in 2021.

In 2020, Young and Janet Hsieh released an educational podcast titled "Jolly Good Kangaroo", that focuses on children's storytelling in British and American English.

=== 2021–present ===
In 2021, Young starred as Detective Kekoa Shaw in James Wan's horror film Malignant, alongside Annabelle Wallis and Maddie Hasson. The film was released theatrically by Warner Bros. Pictures and simultaneously streamed on HBO Max. Malignant developed a significant cult following for its blend of horror and action genres.

In 2022, Young appeared as Tad Fairchild opposite Lindsay Lohan and Chord Overstreet in the Netflix romantic comedy Falling for Christmas. The film reached number one globally on Netflix, accumulating 37.85 million hours viewed in its opening week.

In 2024, Young played Howard in Lionsgate's The Strangers: Chapter 1, directed by Renny Harlin, alongside Madelaine Petsch and Gabriel Basso. That same year, he appeared as Sam in the ensemble comedy Nuked opposite Justin Bartha, Anna Camp, Lucy Punch, and Tawny Newsome. The film premiered at the Tribeca Film Festival in 2024.

In 2025, Young created, wrote, and executive produced the documentary series Heartbeat, which chronicles his and his wife Janet Hsieh's five-year IVF journey. He also starred alongside Lea Salonga in The Vale – Origins, a hybrid live-action and animated short film based on Abigail Hing Wen's novel.

In 2026, Young reprised his role as Howard in The Strangers – Chapter 3, also directed by Harlin.

== Personal life ==
In 2015, Young married television host Janet Hsieh. They have two sons, one born in 2017 and the other in 2021.

== Philanthropy ==
In 2012 and 2013, Young partnered with Kiehl's to raise money and awareness for autism. Young is the eldest of four brothers, two of whom are autistic; raising awareness of autism and raising funds to support those with autism is a cause that he feels strongly about.

"People with autism are just that– people first and foremost, with a condition that is autism...they have hobbies, they have loves, they have passions, but all of it is locked within this condition that is autism. There's no cure for autism at the moment, but with treatments at an early age, their thought potential can be unlocked."

In addition to his charity work, Young has also fronted two government-funded youth campaigns: the anti-drug campaign Dance Works! 2012, sponsored by Central Narcotics Bureau in Singapore, and the Health Promotion Board in Singapore's Bounce Back Stronger campaign for youth resilience.

== Filmography ==
=== Film ===
- The Strangers: Chapter 3 (2026)
- Nuked (2024)
- The Strangers: Chapter 1 (2024)
- Falling for Christmas (2022)
- Malignant (2021)
- A Bread Factory: Parts 1 & 2 (2018)
- Home (short film) (2018)
- The Visit (short film) (2018)
- In the Room (2016)
- Final Recipe (2013)
- Shyguys (2013)
- Love...and Other Bad Habits (2013)
- Jhootha Hi Sahi (2010)

=== Television ===
- High 5 Basketball (2016)
- Containment (2016)
- Grace (2014)
- Mata Mata (TV series) (2013)
- Spouse For House (2013)
- Artographer (TV series) (2013)
- History Alive! (TV series) (2013)
- The Journey: A Voyage (2013)
- The Dream Makers (2013)
- Get Social (2013)
- 96°C Café (2013)
- Joys of Life (2012)
- Yours Fatefully (2012)
- artBITES (2011−2012)
- Lunch Crunch (TV Series) (2011)
- The Pupil (2011)
- Million Dollar Money Drop: Singapore Edition (2011)
- The Brian Jackson Show (2009)
- Casualty (2008)

== Awards and nominations ==
- LA Film Awards 2018, for Home (short film): Best Actor in an Indie Film (Winner), "Best Duo" (Winner; award shared with Janet Hsieh), "Best Picture" (Nominated)
- Best Shorts Competition 2018, for Home (short film): Award of Excellence: Actor (Leading) (Winner), "Award of Excellence (Special Mention: Disability Issues)" (Winner), "Award of Excellence: Asian Competition" (Winner)
- Asian Television Award 2015, nominated for Best Actor in a Supporting Role for the HBO (Asia) mini-series Grace
- ELLE Award 2012, winner, for Actor of the Year
- ELLE Award 2011, winner, for Breakout Star of the Year
- Cosmopolitan Singapore's Fearless Male Award, 2011
- Her World Singapore magazine's Sexiest Local Man of 2012 nomination.
