= Falling for Christmas =

2022 film by Janeen Damian

- Official release poster
- Directed by: Janeen Damian
- Screenplay by: Jeff Bonnett; Ron Oliver
- Story by: Jeff Bonnett
- Produced by: Michael Damian; Brad Krevoy
- Starring: Lindsay Lohan
- Cinematography: Graham Robbins
- Edited by: Kristi Shimek
- Music by: Nathan Lanier
- Production companies: Motion Picture Corporation of America; Riviera Films
- Distributed by: Netflix
- Release date: November 10, 2022
- Running time: 95 minutes
- Country: United States
- Language: English

Falling for Christmas is a 2022 American Christmas romantic comedy film starring Lindsay Lohan as a spoiled heiress who loses her memory in a skiing accident and lands in the care of a lodge owner widower at Christmastime. The film is directed by Janeen Damian, in her directorial debut, from a screenplay by Jeff Bonnett and Ron Oliver. Chord Overstreet, George Young, Jack Wagner and Olivia Perez also appear in supporting roles.

It marked Lohan's first role in a major production in over a decade following a series of career setbacks while recovering from addiction and legal issues. Brad Krevoy and Michael Damian serve as producers on the film, which was first announced in May 2021. It began filming in Utah in early November 2021 and wrapped the following month. Lohan, her sister Aliana and Overstreet recorded songs for the project which were also featured in a soundtrack album.

The film was released on November 10, 2022, by Netflix, after a screening event for fans, hosted by the cast and crew, was held in New York City the day before. Several publications, including Rotten Tomatoes, named Falling for Christmas one the best Christmas films of all time. It had one of the best opening weekends for a Netflix original film in 2022.

== Plot ==
Hotel heiress Sierra Belmont has been newly appointed as "vice president of atmosphere" at the luxury ski resort in Aspen owned by her father Beauregard, despite having no interest in the business. While her father is away on business, Sierra goes up a mountain top with her influencer boyfriend Tad for a photo shoot where he proposes to her.

However, the harsh wind causes Sierra, who was wearing skis, to lose balance. She falls from the top of the mountain, is separated from Tad and hits her head on a tree. Unconscious, she is found by Jake Russell, who she bumped into earlier just after his failed business pitch to her father, and is taken to a hospital.

Sierra loses her memory due to the accident and the hospital staff is unable to verify her identify. Jake offers the amnesiac a place at his bed and breakfast hotel, the Northstar Lodge, until she can remember who she is or someone comes to claim her. After taking the name Sarah from a stuffed toy that belongs to Jake's daughter Avy, Sierra decides to help him and his family at the lodge in hopes of getting her memory back, but struggles.

However, Sierra bonds with Jake and his family, especially Avy, as she finds out that she lost her mother a couple years ago and feels empathy for her. She also lost her own mother when she was young and this starts to trigger memories. After improving in helping the lodge, Sierra adjusts to a normal life. As the hotel is struggling, she comes up with a fund raising party for the hotel.

Meanwhile, Tad is lost in the woods and finds shelter with recluse Ralph, who takes him to town on foot. At the Belmont, the hotel staff has not thought to look for Sierra and Tad as they believe that they are away on a trip.

After four days, Beauregard returns from his trip where he finds out that Sierra is missing and informs the Sheriff, who has just retrieved Tad and Ralph. At the party, the town comes together to support the Northstar Lodge, which is declared a historic site.

Before Jake can thank Sierra, Tad and her father rush in to take her home, restoring her memory. On Christmas Day, she does her own chores, much to the staff and Tad's surprise. Sierra decides she will do things for herself going forward and resigns from the position her father created for her realizing she wants to find herself.

Meanwhile, Avy reveals to Jake that her wish was for him to find love and convinces him to seek out Sierra. Realizing that she fell in love with Jake, Sierra breaks off her engagement with Tad. He is not upset, since he has realized that he is interested in Guest Service Manager Terry, so asks him out on a date.

Later, Jake declares his love for Sierra. She decides to go back and help him run the Northstar Lodge, especially when she finds out that it is sold out for the season after she publicly thanked them at a press conference. Beauregard believes he owes Jake a debt of gratitude for finding Sierra and so invests in the lodge.

== Cast ==
- Lindsay Lohan as Sierra Belmont/Sarah
- Chord Overstreet as Jake Russell
- George Young as Tad Fairchild
- Jack Wagner as Beauregard Belmont
- Olivia Perez as Avy Russell
- Alejandra Flores as Alejandra Carlisle
- Chase Ramsey as Terry Carver
- Aliana Lohan as Bianca
- Kate Rachesky as Heather
- Sean J. Dillingham as Ralph
- Oscar Rudecindo as Darius
- Lonzo Liggins as Mayor Howard Anand
- Antonio D. Charity as Sheriff Borden
- Blythe Howard as Dr. Layla Monroe

== Production ==
In May 2021, Netflix announced that Lindsay Lohan would return to acting by starring in a Christmas romantic comedy for the streaming service and revealed its premise. The film's production details were reported by Variety, with Janeen Damian set to direct the screenplay written by Jeff Bonnett and Ron Oliver. Motion Picture Corporation of America's Brad Krevoy and Riviera Films' Michael Damian would be producing, while Amanda Phillips, Eric Jarboe and David Wulf served as executive producers. It was scheduled to start production in November, so it would be released for the 2022 holiday season. In October, Michael Damian confirmed in an interview that filming would begin the following month in Utah, elaborating on the project:

It's a comedy, a lot of really funny moments. We're excited to be working with [Lindsay], she's an incredible talent [...] Netflix approached us, I think we kind of became the go-to Christmas team [... they] said 'we've got a project that we're excited about', that Lindsay was attached to star in it and [asked] 'would you guys be interested in making it?' and we were like, 'yes, we would be thrilled to make it!', and it sort of evolved that way.

In early November, it was announced Chord Overstreet had been cast as Lohan's love interest in the film. George Young, Jack Wagner and Olivia Perez would also appear in undisclosed roles. In the following week, Netflix released a first look of the film, a publicity still featuring Lohan and Overstreet, which was still untitled. A production listing then reported principal photography for the film, under the working title Christmas in Wonderland, would take place in Utah, from November 8 to December 15, 2021. It was filmed in Park City and Salt Lake City. Overstreet was originally considered for the role of Tad Fairchild. Lohan improvised some of the comedy scenes and did some of her own stunts. Lohan was involved in her character's costuming. After the production, Lohan spoke about the importance of receiving a credit as executive producer: "It's a really different role that I get to play aside from just starring in the movie. It's being involved in the projects at every step: the whole casting process, the editing and production process. And even parts of the script." Writer Ron Oliver said:

Lindsay knows her stuff cold and she brings ideas to the table. [...] It's really a movie about redemption, or finding your way back to the right path after you've been a spoiled kid. [...] When you write holiday scripts, you're conscious of the tropes of Christmas but also of the tropes of cinema. Lindsay's life has been examined and reported on so closely ever since she was a kid—I was aware of how Falling for Christmas might reflect her story when I was writing it.

== Promotion ==
In February 2022, Netflix released its 2022 movie preview with a video teaser featuring footage from its most anticipated releases that included a clip of Lohan in the film, officially titled Falling for Christmas. That same month, Lohan talked to Vogue about her decision to join the film:

I feel like what we don't have enough of right now is romantic comedies. And that's exactly what it is: It's a really fun, uplifting romantic comedy. And it's actually really funny. When I read the script and when we started to film it, I didn't realize how physically funny we were going to be. There's a lot of physical comedy in it, which I really liked doing—it's one of my favorite things to do, which I haven't got to in a while.

In July 2022, Lohan's mother Dina revealed her daughter Aliana would also be appearing in Falling for Christmas, as well as contributing with two songs. She had previously shared that both siblings would be singing in the film. On October 3, Netflix released the official poster and more information about the project, with Lohan describing her character Sierra as "Extravagant. Temperamental. Glamorous." On October 7, Netflix shared the movie's official trailer. After the release, the filmmakers talked about working with Lohan and the film's reception: "She's such an amazing actress and comedian and it was really fun working with her. She's really prepared and very professional and really enjoys her work. [...] it's just now coming to fruition and we're just now seeing how the world is embracing it. We will be very open to a sequel, that sounds like a lot of fun."

== Music ==
Falling for Christmas

Soundtrack album by Nathan Lanier
- Released: November 11, 2022
- Recorded: 2022
- Genre: Film soundtrack
- Length: 1:10:36
- Label: Netflix
- Producer: Nathan Lanier

The trailer for Falling for Christmas featured a cover version of "Jingle Bell Rock" recorded by Lohan for the film as a nod to her performance of the song in 2004's teen comedy Mean Girls. Netflix announced the full track would be available to stream on November 4, a week prior to the film's premiere. The full length version features a rap verse by Ali Tomineek, and a lyric video with footage from the film accompanied its digital release. A performance of "Everybody Loves Christmas" by Overstreet and a rendition of "Jingle Bells" by Aliana Lohan are also featured in the movie. On November 25, 2022, producer Michael Damian released his track "Must Be Christmas" recorded for the film. The soundtrack album, which includes the three original songs by Lindsay Lohan, Aliana Lohan and Chord Overstreet, along with the entire film score by Nathan Lanier, was released on November 11, 2022:

1. "Jingle Bell Rock" (Lindsay Lohan featuring Ali Tomineek)
2. "Everybody Loves Christmas" (Chord Overstreet)
3. "Jingle Bells" (Aliana Lohan)
4. Morning Entourage
5. Belmont Stakes
6. Brunch With Beau
7. North Star Lodge
8. Your Chariot Awaits
9. Is This Thing Safe?
10. Snowmobile
11. Avy's Wish / Down the Mountain
12. Jane Doe
13. Where Am I?
14. Raccoon vs. Granny Gown
15. Cabin in the Woods
16. Making Breakfast
17. Missing
18. Tangles & Bubbles
19. Christmas Village
20. Joy to the World / Making Memories
21. Jake's Angel
22. It's Not You...It's You
23. Topping the Tree
24. Find My Daughter
25. The Dress
26. Giving Back
27. Christmas Morning
28. The Wish Was for You
29. Reservations
30. A Christmas to Remember

== Release ==
The film was released on November 10, 2022, on Netflix. The cast and crew attended a special fan screening premiere event on November 9 at the Paris Theater in Manhattan. It debuted at number one on Netflix's most watched movies list the day after its release. It had the fourth-biggest opening weekend for a Netflix original since May 2022 and the best start for an English-speaking film released on a Thursday on the streaming service. According to Whip Media's weekly ranker, it was the second most streamed movie overall in the United States in its debut tracking week (November 7–13), which only counted its first four days, and rose to number one in the following week. It also went on to become the top-streamed film globally on Netflix in its second week. It ranked on Nielsen's U.S. overall streaming ratings top 10 at ten, which covers series and film viewing on TV sets only, and third among movies after its first four days of availability. As of December 16, 2022, Falling for Christmas was the most-watched holiday movie released in 2022 by U.S. households that season, according to smart TV data collected by Samba TV.

A week after the release, Lohan reacted to the response the film received and thanked the crew and fans on social media: "I can't even begin to tell everyone how grateful I am for this incredible moment! To all of the fans and longtime believers in me, I appreciate you. My heart is filled with so much love and gratitude. Thank you Netflix for letting me bring this story to life with such a wonderful cast, director, producers and crew!" Falling for Christmas aired on Dutch television channel RTL 8 in prime time on December 19, 2022, becoming one of few Netflix original programming of its kind to have been broadcast on a TV channel.

== Reception ==
=== Critical response ===
On the review aggregator website Rotten Tomatoes, 62% of 55 critics' reviews are positive, with an average rating of 4.8/10. The website's consensus reads: "It's no Miracle on 34th Street, but viewers in the mood for some fa la la la Lohan will find Falling for Christmas as easy as falling on the couch." Metacritic, which uses a weighted average, assigned the film a score of 40 out of 100, based on 16 critics, indicating "mixed or average" reviews.

Samantha Bergeson of the IndieWire stated the film features Lohan's "career-best work in years" and called it "the Citizen Kane of Netflix Christmas Movies", continuining that "Lohan absolutely owns the film, with Overstreet a worthy counterpart and a generous scene partner." In the Guardian, Benjamin Lee called the film "as bland and cloying as any other low-budget festive romance but serves as a strong reminder of [Lohan's] confident screen presence." Writing for Vanity Fair, Richard Lawson said Lohan "is back in bright form in the better-than-average Christmas B-movie film" that "is as dumbly winning as it's trying to be. In a more profound sense, it is heartening to see Lohan looking and acting well." David Roony of THR claimed that "if you're going to do an Overboard knockoff that slides into the generic sludge of sentimental holiday-season rom-com, then at least find a couple of leads with the charisma and chemistry to pull it off." Courtney Howard of Variety expressed that the film's "subversive spirit, female-forward smarts and sweet sentimentality remix the formulaic and festive, making all things merry and bright" and it is Lohan's "new, snappy and vibrant work that excels," describing her as "hilarious [...] yet also delicately faceted when melancholic moments arise."

The A.V. Club's Luke Thompson wrote that "it's silly, sitcom-y, and impossible to call "good," but Falling for Christmas is the kind of bad that feels almost appealing," calling Lohan the best part of the holiday rom-com that "occasionally charms" despite being predictable and formulaic. Ed Potton of the Times described it as an "aggressively unambitious blend of pantomime acting, knackered plotting and will-this-do? dialogue," with Lohan being "the least worst thing in it, showing the odd flicker of her old charisma." Writing for RogerEbert.com, Marya E. Gates called it a "tinsel-covered twist on Overboard", commenting "there is a warmth to this film that's hard to resist" and that "Lohan's irrepressible charm" holds it together. In Rolling Stone, K. Austin Collins also called it a formulaic film that "reminds audiences what made [Lohan] a movie star in the first place", writing, "This healthy dollop of Christmas camp [...] is eager to give Lohan something to do. That's the point, and that's what the movie pleasingly accomplishes." Sandra Gonzalez of CNN said: "Some actors shoot for Oscars, and that's great. Lohan's magic power has always been bringing to life films that have the simple goal of being unchallenging delights. If for that and that alone, Falling for Christmas is a gift." The Los Angeles Times's Noel Murray praised Lohan's performance, stating that she brings "every bit of her earthy charisma to a rare leading role" and "a spontaneous sincerity to even the corniest scenes. The movie's wrapping is shiny and plastic, but its star quality is genuine."

=== Accolades ===
In December 2022, Rotten Tomatoes ranked Falling for Christmas as the 90th best Christmas movie of all time. The Independent, TheWrap, Cosmopolitan, TV Guide, Seventeen, Den of Geek, Elle, Women's Health, CafeMom, the A.V. Club, Star Tribune, York Vision, Young Hollywood, Harper's Bazaar, Bloomberg, the New York Film Academy, The Herald, Radio Times, Marie Claire, Huffington Post UK, the New York Times and Vanity Fair, among others, listed it as one of the best holiday movies of the season. In 2023, Vanity Fair, People and InStyle also named it one of the best Christmas movies of all time.

Year	Award	Category	Recipient(s)	Result	Ref.
2023	The ReFrame Stamp	2022 Top 100 Narrative Feature Recipients	Falling for Christmas	Won	

== See also ==
- List of Christmas films
