= Fun Taiwan =

Television series

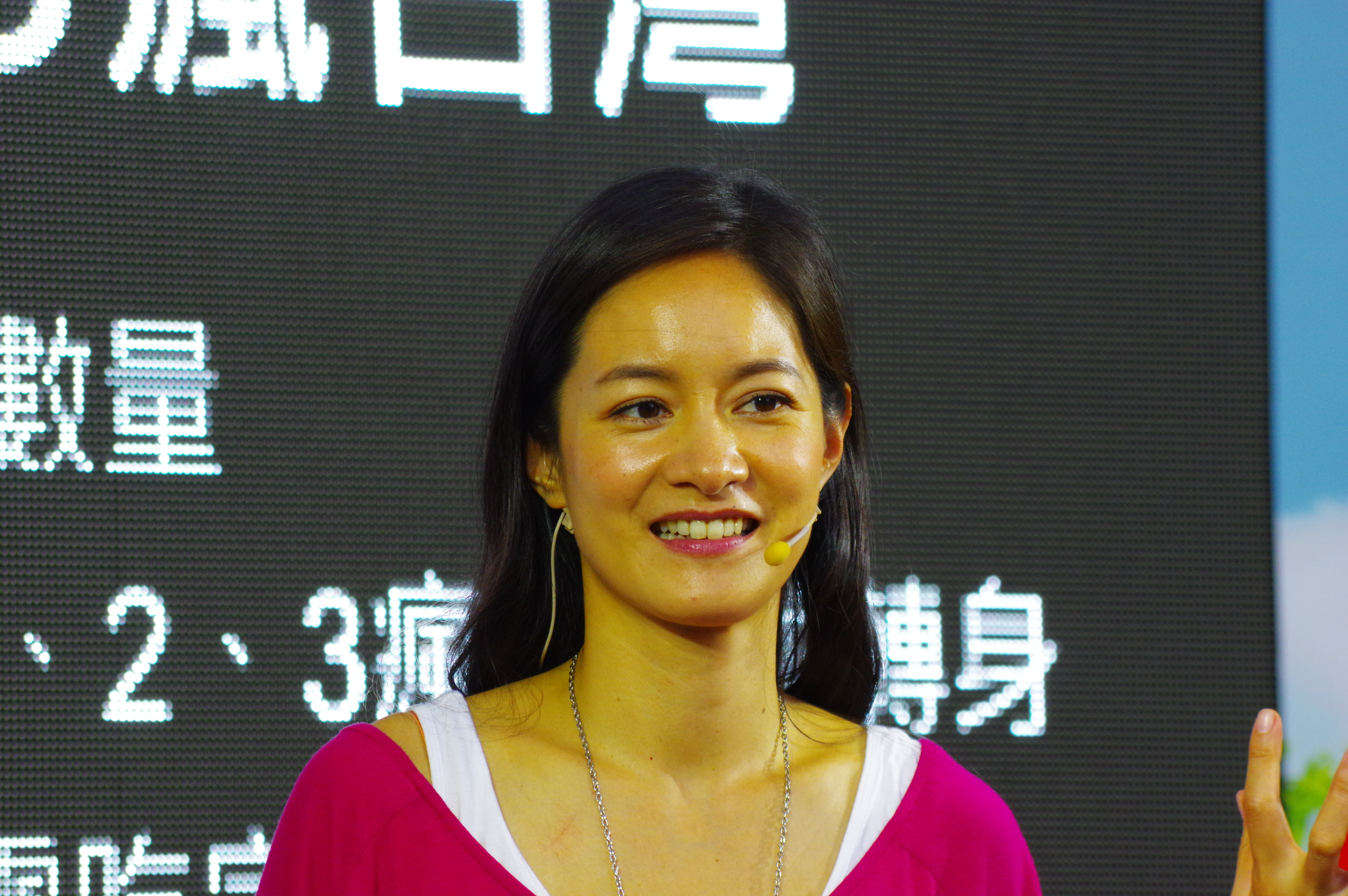

Fun Taiwan is a long-running Taiwanese travel program hosted by Taiwanese-American Janet Hsieh and airing on Discovery's TLC Asia. It began production in 2005, and is currently in its 16th season. Past guests have included host Armando Reed of TLC's Armando's Asian Twist, Singapore-based television personality George Young, American-based television personality JJ Yosh, and Taiwan-based Turkish television personality Rifat Karlova.

The show has also expanded to include a reality show spin-off entitled Fun Taiwan Challenge.

== Golden Bell Awards ==
Year	Category	Nominee	Result
2008	Best Travel Series		Nominated
2008	Best Host of a Travel Show	Janet Hsieh	Nominated
2009	Best Host of a Travel Show	Janet Hsieh	Nominated
2010	Best Travel Series		Nominated
2010	Best Host of a Travel Show	Janet Hsieh	Nominated
2011	Best Travel Series		Nominated
2011	Best Host of a Travel Show	Janet Hsieh	Won

== Asian Television Awards ==
Year	Category	Nominee	Result
2007	Best Entertainment Presenter	Janet Hsieh	Highly Commended
2011	Best General Entertainment Program		Nominated
2011	Best Entertainment Presenter	Janet Hsieh	Nominated
