= Joys of Life =

Singaporean TV series

- 花样人间
- Genre: Period drama Musical; Romance; Family
- Written by: 谢俊源 Seah Choon Guan 林锦兰 Lim Gim Lan 陈海兴 Tan Ai Heng
- Directed by: 黄光荣 Wong Kuang Yong 高淑怡 Gao Shu Yi 谢益文 Edmund Tse 卢燕金 Loo Yin Kam
- Starring: Chew Chor Meng; Alien Huang; Rui En; Chen Liping; Zheng Geping; Chloe Wang; Kate Pang; Andie Chen; Huang Wenyong; Lin Meijiao; Zhang Yao Dong
- Opening theme: 珍惜 by Power Station
- Country of origin: Singapore
- Original language: Chinese
- No. of episodes: 35

Production
- Producer: Winnie Wong 王尤红
- Running time: approx. 42–46 minutes

Original release
- Network: MediaCorp Channel 8
- Release: 26 June – 13 August 2012

Related
- Yours Fatefully; Don't Stop Believin'

Joys of Life (Chinese: 花样人间; pinyin: Huāyàng Rénjiān) is a Singaporean Chinese drama which was telecasted on Singapore's free-to-air channel, MediaCorp Channel 8. It stars Chew Chor Meng, Alien Huang, Rui En, Chen Liping, Zheng Geping, Chloe Wang, Kate Pang, Andie Chen, Huang Wenyong, Lin Meijiao and Zhang Yao Dong as the cast of the series.

The series was produced to celebrate 30 years of Chinese language drama being broadcast in Singapore. Set in post-World War II Singapore, the story line spans the decade between the end of the Japanese occupation and the HDB's clearing of squatters during the late 1950s to early 1960s. It is the first on-screen pairing of Rui En and Alien Huang, and Huang's first Singaporean drama.

== Plot ==
In an old tenement house at Huaxiang Street, several families live together and play out the acts in life every day. The story revolves around six friends – Zhao Mingxing (Alien Huang), Qian Yiduo (Zhang Yaodong), Han Yongyong (Rui En) and her sister Rourou (Chloe Wang) and Sun Zibin (Andie Chen) and his sister Lianjing (Kate Pang) – and their families as they go about their lives in post-World War II Singapore.

True to his name, Zhao Mingxing "Star", dreams of becoming a star. He is raised by his father, a movie billboard artist. Zhao Dagou (Chew Chor Meng), who has lived through the horrors of the Japanese Occupation, is a master storyteller. Dagou often chides Mingxing for being childish. Zibin, who works in the office of the TV station, has a leftist younger sister, Sun Lianjing. His mother Cai Shuxian (Pan Lingling) married Uncle Roti (San Yow), a bread seller, through an arranged marriage. Shuxian often gripes that she is a victim of a feudal marriage. Han Yongyong is the adopted daughter of Han Jianren (Huang Wenyong), a cook whose love for women and booze forces his wife Liu Daiyu (Lin Meijiao) to be the breadwinner of the family. The couple had wanted to adopt a boy after Daiyu failed to conceive, but the child was swapped. Yongyong grew up being raised as a boy. Thereafter, they gave birth to three daughters. One of them, Han Rourou, is the beauty of Huaxiang Street. She is every man's dream girl, but her heart is set on marrying a foreigner.

The tenement house is owned by bakery owner Qian Caifa (Zheng Geping) and his stingy wife Jin Yinjiao (Chen Liping). The couple has three sons. Qian Yiduo often leaves any dirty job to his indignant younger brother Qian Erduo (Romeo Tan)while he goes off to gallivant, but is still allowed to take over the bakery. This sparks resentment in Erduo. This family occupies the big unit above the bakery. The other occupants are Caifa's cousin Qian Caiguang (Chen Guohua), the latter's wife, Wang Limei (Lin Liyun), who works in a charcoal shop, and their daughter Qian Meihua (Adeline Lim). The mean Caifa took them in only because he feels guilty of having schemed against his cousin to possess the bakery. Although Caifa is prosperous, his marriage is not entirely blissful for he has never gotten over the fact that Cousin Caiguang once embraced Yinjiao. Instead, he is a secret admirer of Shuxian who has more class.

Mingxing loses heart after several unsuccessful attempts to be a star search finalist. He decides to study acting in Japan. While openly opposing it, Dagou nevertheless secretly tries to raise money for his son's overseas education. Moved by this, the filial Mingxing eventually gives up the opportunity to study abroad. When Mingxing finds out that Lianjing is a closet fan of stars, the quarrelsome pair who shares a common interest start dating each other in secret. Dagou saves Zhang Xiaoyu (Apple Hong) who suffers from amnesia. While Mingxing is eager to pair his father with Xiaoyu, Dagou is against the idea.

Yiduo is unaware that Erduo is scheming against him in attempt to take over the bakery. He meets with danger on several occasions, only to be saved by Yongyong who seems to be able to connect in mind with him. Yiduo grows fond of her. Yongyong takes up employment as a domestic help in a Caucasian family. A keen learner, she seizes the chance to learn English, and catches the fancy of Master Johnson (Bobby Tonelli). Rourou breaks up with Yiduo, saying that he is too dependent on his mother.

Rourou signs a contract with a record company. Peterson (George Young), the boss of the company, goes out with Rourou to celebrate. They both get drunk and Peterson takes advantage of Rourou. Peterson, who grew to love Rourou, proposes to Rourou and confesses his love for her. Rourou refuses at first, but ultimately agrees. However, Peterson's family reject Rourou as a daughter-in-law and the pregnant Rourou is abandoned. Daiyu pretends to be the one pregnant so as to protect Rourou from shame, but the latter gives birth to a baby of mixed race. Thereafter, rumours spread, with everyone gossiping behind Rourou's back. Only Zibin stands steadfast beside her.

The getai business is at its peak. The three buddies start Xin Hua Xiang Stage Company. Recognising Dagou's talent as a standup comic, Xiaoyu encourages him to perform at getai shows. Just as Daogou's feelings for Xiaoyu grows, a Japanese by the name of Yamaguchi (Rayson Tan) appears claiming to be Xiaoyu's husband. Dagou is jolted to his senses. Mistaking Xiaoyu for a Japanese, he starts to distance himself from her, however, he feels anguish seeing how she is mistreated by Yamaguchi. The intense competition in the getai business compels Xin Hua Xiang to consider joining the bandwagon in offering striptease acts, to Zibin and Lianjing's objections. Song and dance versus striptease act, the former emerges as the loser.

Mingxing and Lianjing breaks off due to irreconcilable differences. Their business suffers when the famous comedians Fatty and Skinny leave. Dagou and the witty Uncle Roti salvage the situation by taking centrestage. Surprisingly, they are a hit with the crowd, thus saving Xin Hua Xiang. Uncle Roti stands tall in front of his wife who has always despised him.

1963 sees the advent of the television. Rourou starts life afresh and drags Yongyong to participate in Talentime on TV. Mingxing invites them to perform at his getai, and they become the singing sensation of love ballads. Yiduo falls for Yongyong, but just as he is about to woo her, he discovers to his horror that Yongyong is his twin elder sister. It turns out that Yinjiao had a difficult labour and was unaware that she had given birth to twins. Yongyong was sold away at birth. When Jianren finds out that Caifa is Yongyong's biological father, he creates a ruckus by demanding his money back. Yongyong remains filial to her adoptive parents. On finding out that Caifa has given her up for Shuxian, the jealous Yinjiao flies into a rage and wants to drive her family out.

Set up by Erduo, Yiduo and Lianjing end up in bed together in a drunken stupor. The odd couple are forced to tie the knot. Xiaoyu regains her memory out of a sudden. The truth is revealed that Yamaguchi is the culprit behind her unfortunate state. After Yamaguchi is driven away, Dagou picks up courage to express his love to Xiaoyu. However, he is stunned when Xiaoyu reveals that she is a majie who has vowed celibacy. Meanwhile, Mingxing and Yongyong begin to appreciate each other's virtues, and their feelings for each other grows.

Unhappy that Yongyong is more popular than her, Rourou quits as a singing duo to go solo but fails to earn an audience. For the sake of money, Rourou resorts to performing striptease but is driven to perform in Kuala Lumpur following a police raid. Zibin stays faithfully by her side. When Rourou retires from singing and plumps herself in the bakery, Erduo sets fire to the shop out of resentment. News that the bakery had been razed reached Caifa and Yinjiao, and through their shop neighbour, they find out that Erduo was seen inside the bakery at that time.

== Cast ==
- Chew Chor Meng as Zhao Dagou 赵大狗
- Alien Huang as Zhao Mingxing 赵明星
- Huang Wenyong as Han Jianren 韩建仁
- Lin Meijiao as Liu Daiyu 刘黛玉
- Rui En as Han Yongyong 韩咏咏

=== Han family ===
Cast	Role	Description
Chloe Wang	Han Rourou 韩柔柔	Jianren and Daiyu's second daughter Yongyong's sister Previously liked Mingxing; Zibin's girlfriend Went to Malaya in episode 23; Gave birth to hers and Peterson's son in episode 28; Quit getai in episode 34 and went to Malaya to establish her career in episode 35
Vina Lim	Han Zhuzhu	Jianren and Daiyu's daughter
Lorraine Koh	Han Meimei	Jianren and Daiyu's daughter

=== Qian family ===
Cast	Role	Description
Zheng Geping	Qian Caifa 钱财发	Towkay; Yinjiao's husband Owner of a bakery Yongyong's biological father Learned that Yongyong is her biological daughter in episode 14; Got knocked out by Erduo in episode 26; Reconciled and acknowledge Yongyong in episode 34; Chased Erduo out of the house after discovering what he had done in episode 35
Chen Liping	Jin Yinjiao 金银娇	Towkay Neo, Fei Po Jiao; Caifa's domineering wife Yongyong's biological mother Discovered that Yongyong is her biological daughter in episode 21; Fell down the stairs in episode 21 and suffer from amnesia in episode 23; Reconciled and acknowledge with Yongyong in episode 34
Rui En	Han Yongyong 韩咏咏	See Han family
Zhang Yaodong	Qian Yiduo 钱一多	Da Long Caifa and Yinjiao's eldest son Yongyong's biological twin brother Rourou's ex-boyfriend Lianjing's husband Discovered that Yongyong is his twin sister in episode 24; Got beaten by Loanshark Qiang while trying to save Yongyong in episode 26; Slept with Lianjing in episode 27; Married Lianjing in episode 28; Became a father in the end
Kate Pang	Sun Lianjing 孙廉静	See Sun family
Romeo Tan	Qian Erduo 钱二多	Main Villain, Lao Er; Caifa and Yinjiao's second son Ordered someone to hit Caifa in episode 26; Make Lianjing and Yiduo slept together in episode 27 and were seen by Sanduo; Caused the death of Caigang in episode 33; Chased out of the house by Caifa in episode 34; Set fire to Forever Fragrant bakery in episode 35 and disappeared Returned and became mentally unstable in the end
Ivan Lo	Qian Sanduo 钱三多	Xiao Long Caifa and Yinjiao's youngest son
Bryan Chan	Qian Caiguang 钱财光	Relative of Qian Caifa; Died in episode 33
Lin Liyun	Wang Limei	Qian Cai Guang's wife
Adeline Lim	Qian Meihua 钱梅花	Qian Caiguang and Wang Limei's daughter

=== Sun family ===
Cast	Role	Description
Yao Wenlong	Sun Yaping 孙亚平	Roti; Xianya's Husband "Roti" (bread) seller Intended to divorced Xianya after what she had done but ultimately reconciled with her in episode 28
Pan Lingling	Cai Xianya 蔡贤雅	Ducky (Xian Ya) Yaping's wife A school teacher Kissed Yama-san in episode 25; Intended to commit suicide in episode 28 but ultimately reconciled with Yaping
Andie Chen	Sun Zibin 孙子斌	Sun Zi Bin Fa; Xianya and Yaping's son Worked for a radio company Meiguang's love interest Expressed his love for Rourou and went to Malaya in episode 35
Kate Pang	Sun Lianjing 孙廉菁	Pale Face (Lian Qing Qing); Xianya and Yaping's daughter Mingxing's ex-girlfriend Yiduo's wife

=== Supporting cast ===
Cast	Role	Description
Chua Cheng Pou	Bro Bing Shui	Iceball seller
Yak Yilin	Yun Yun	
Silver Ang	Gong Bao Zhu	Rourou's friend
Hu Yi Xiang	Mi Fen-Sao	Beehoon seller
Dick Su		Malay film producer
Bobby Tonelli	Johnson	Mary's son In love with Yongyong; Left for England in episode 30
George Young	Peterson	A record executive of a company Had a one-night stand with Rourou under the influence of alcohol Father of Rourou's baby Planning to marry Rourou but disappeared as their marriage was rejected by his father in episode 21
Candyce Toh	Chen Mei Guang	Singer of Xin Hua Xiang Stage Company.
Brandon Wong	Wang Xia	Skinny; Ex-comedy actor of Xin Hua Xiang Stage Company; Left for Malaya as he need to take care for his sick mother and act there as well
Wu Jian Hua	Yan Feng	Fatty; Ex-comedy actor of Xin Hua Xiang Stage Company; Left for Malaya to join Wang Xia
Joey Feng	Mona Meng Na	A dancer of Lulu's performances Partly responsible for tearing Lulu's dress during her performance in episode 23
Jessica Tan	Lu Lu	Singer of Wan Li Hong Stage Company
Apple Hong	Xiao Yu	Da Gou's girlfriend

=== Special appearance ===
Cast	Role	Description	Episodes appeared	
Jacelyn Tay	Lee Ling Hua	Movie celebrity	1	
Moses Lim	Tan Ah Kong	Lee Ling Hua's godfather	1	Also portrayed Tan Ah Teck in the first popular and award-winning locally produced English sitcom known as Under One Roof, and coincidentally being his grandson's name in this drama, portrayed by Tan Junsheng.
Tan Junsheng	Tan Ah Teck	Tan Ah Kong's grandson	1	Same name as his grandfather Tan Ah Kong's actor Moses Lim in the first popular and award-winning locally produced English sitcom known as Under One Roof.
Florence Tan	Liu Jialing	Dagou's ex-wife who died	2,4,9,10,17	
Zhou Quanxi	Gan Shu	Worker of the bakery	2,4,8,13	
Chen Tianxiang	Hui Shu	Worker of the bakery	2,4,13	
Lina Ng	Little Trumpet	She is one of the cast in a radio drama	3,6	
Li Wenhai	Wu Ren Bi	Blind fortune teller	5,8,12	
Tracer Wong	Mary	Han Yongyong's towkay when working at the Caucasian family Johnson's mother	6,7,9,11,13,14,16,27,28	
Cai Ping Kai	Qi Po/Er-gu		6,13	
Darren Lim	Cai Nan	Film producer	7,8	
Wang Yuqing	Gui Li Qiang	Villain; A loan shark and local bully Lulu's man Shot dead by police in episode 28	15,17,19,23,25,26,28	

== Production ==
Joys of Life was filmed in conjunction with MediaCorp's 30th anniversary of local drama. It is a star-studded mid-year blockbuster drama which continues the legacy of famous getai works "Wok of Life" (福满人间) and "Springs of Life" (春到人间). Set in the '60s to '70s when mobile getai was all the rage, the story will allude to well-known entertainers of the day such as Sakura Teng and the comedy icons Wang Sha and Ye Feng.

Chew Chor Meng makes a comeback after a brief absence due to illness alongside fellow veterans Chen Liping, Zheng Geping, Huang Wenyong, Lin Meijiao, Pan Lingling and Rayson Tan. The cast also includes younger local household names Rui En, Zhang Yao Dong, Andie Chen and Romeo Tan and Taiwanese idols Cynthia Wang and Alien Huang (Xiao Gui). Former artistes such as Cai Ping Kai, Chen Zhonghua, Lina Ng, Tracer Wong, Jacelyn Tay, Moses Lim and Darren Lim made special appearances.

This drama is the first drama in almost 10 years to be filmed at the previously closed Tuas TV World. It was used by the SBC and TCS and is now a training ground for police specialist training. Scenes of the main street and town were filmed there while the rest were filmed at the studios, on the compound of MediaCorp's Caldecott Hill headquarters and nature areas. Another drama was initially planned but was scrapped and "merged" with Joys of Life instead. Filming began on 6 February 2012 and ended on 16 May 2012, and trailers started airing from 29 May 2012. It was directed by 4 directors in different episodes.

This was the third "人间" (period drama-comedy) produced by MediaCorp after Wok of Life (福满人间) and Springs of Life (春到人间). Only Chew Chor Meng has starred in all three.

== Reception ==
Joys of Life was the highest-rated drama of the year in terms of viewership ratings with some 993,000 viewers for its finale, until Don't Stop Believin' overtook the record by breaking the 1 million mark for its finale in September 2012.

== Accolades ==
Year	Award	Accolade	Nominee / Work	Result	Ref
2013	Star Awards	Young Talent Award 青苹果奖	Lorraine Koh Jia Xin 许佳欣	Nominated	
2013	Star Awards	Best Theme Song 最佳主题曲	"珍惜"	Won	
2013	Star Awards	Best Director 最佳导演	Loo Yin Kam 卢燕金	Nominated	
2013	Star Awards	Best Screenplay 最佳剧本	Seah Choon Guan 谢俊源; Lim Gim Lan 林锦兰; Tan Ai Heng 陈海兴	Nominated	
2013	Star Awards	Best Drama Cameraman 最佳戏剧摄影	Lee Heng Soon Tommy 李兴顺	Nominated	
2013	Star Awards	Best Costume & Image Design 最佳服装与造型设计	Xu Ying Ying 徐盈盈	Won	
2013	Star Awards	Best Music & Sound Design 最佳音乐与音效设计	Zheng Kai Hua 郑凯华	Won	
2013	Star Awards	Rocket Award	Romeo Tan	Won	
2013	Star Awards	Favourite Male Character 最喜爱男角色	Alien Huang	Nominated	
2013	Star Awards	Favourite On-screen Couple (Drama) 最喜爱银幕情侣	Alien Huang and Rui En	Nominated	
2013	Star Awards	Best Actor	Chew Chor Meng	Nominated	
2013	Star Awards	Best Supporting Actor	Huang Wenyong	Nominated	
2013	Star Awards	Best Supporting Actor	Romeo Tan	Nominated	
2013	Star Awards	Best Supporting Actress	Kate Pang	Nominated	
2013	Asian Television Awards	Best Actress in a Supporting Role	Kate Pang	Highly Commended	

== See also ==
- List of MediaCorp Channel 8 Chinese Drama Series (2010s)
