= Yours Fatefully =

Singaporean TV series

- 孤男寡女
- Genre: Comedy; Romance; Melodrama
- Written by: Ng Kah Huay 黄佳华
- Directed by: 林坤辉 林美娜 苏妙芳
- Starring: Kingone Wang; Jesseca Liu; Xiang Yun; Chen Shucheng; Eelyn Kok; Cavin Soh; Sora Ma
- Opening theme: 幸福记号 by Olivia Ong
- Ending theme: 厚脸皮 by Ella Chen
- Country of origin: Singapore
- Original language: Chinese
- No. of episodes: 20

Production
- Producer: Soh Bee Lian 苏美莲
- Running time: Approx. 45 minutes

Original release
- Network: MediaCorp Channel 8
- Release: 29 May – 25 June 2012

Related
- Absolutely Charming; Joys of Life

Yours Fatefully (Chinese: 孤男寡女) is a Singaporean Chinese drama which was telecasted on Singapore's free-to-air channel, MediaCorp Channel 8. It was a mid-year blockbuster for 2012. It stars Kingone Wang, Jesseca Liu, Xiang Yun, Chen Shucheng, Eelyn Kok, Cavin Soh & Sora Ma as the casts of this series.

== Plot ==
Su Xiaoyi is a single professional photographer who lives with his sickly father afflicted with night blindness. As his siblings are married, the burden of taking care of his ailing father naturally falls on him. Song Xinxin is a single professional make-up artist who lives with her mother suffering from an anxiety disorder. As her siblings have settled down with their own families, she has no choice but to live with her mother. The burden of looking after her mother naturally falls on her. These two individuals lead a colourless life of drudgery and loneliness until they meet each other on an arranged marriage date. Unfortunately, a misunderstanding causes the meeting to end on a sour note. This is followed by several unpleasant encounters. It is not until frequent contact due to work that both realise it is possible to have a cordial relationship exchanging thoughts. Gradually, they learn to appreciate each other's strengths, and love blossoms between them. What takes them by complete surprise is that Su Shuntian and Zhang Xiuying, after becoming friends at a senior citizens' activity, provide each other with a listening ear and build up an interesting relationship. They look forward to meeting each other, keeping the relationship from their children but unaware that both are in-laws. Both Su Shuntian and Zhang Xiuying have the idea of spending their lives together. Not only can they look after each other but they will no longer be a burden to their children. As Su Shuntian and Zhang Xiuying are about to make the announcement, Su Xiaoyi and Song Xinxin arrange for the two elderly parents to live in their new place. What will be the reaction? Surprised, shocked, dumbfounded, helpless...? How will the four of them face this situation? Let Su Shuntian and Zhang Xiuying have their way, or Su Xiaoyi and Song Xinxin? Or simply defy convention to become one happy family?

== Cast ==
Actor	Role	Description
Kingone Wang	Su Xiaoyi 苏孝仪	Single professional photographer. Su Shuntian's son Nice and obliging. Fell in love and married Xin Xin.
Jesseca Liu	Song Xinxin 宋心心	Single professional make-up artist. Liu Xiuying's daughter. Decides to pursue her true love by marrying to Xiao Yi.
Eelyn Kok	Song Yiyi 宋依依	Liu Xiuying's daughter. Married to Wu Zheng Bang at a young age.
Xiang Yun	Liu Xiuying 刘秀英	Song Xinxin and Song Yiyi's mum. Suffering from an anxiety disorder. Met Su Shun Tian. Misunderstanding between each other.
Chen Shucheng	Su Shuntian 苏顺天	Sickly father of Su Xiaoyi. Suffering from night blindness. Met Xiu Ying at a community event. Misunderstanding between each other.
May Phua	Su Xiaolian 苏孝莲	Su Xiaoyi's sister. Bossy by nature and likes to interfere in other people's affairs. Cares about Xiao Yi's state of loneliness. Often interferes in Xiao Yi and Xin Xin's relationship.
Cavin Soh	Wu Zhenbang 吴振邦	Song Yiyi's husband. Miserly and boastful.
Zen Chong	Hong Zhiguo 洪治国	Song Xinxin's ex-boyfriend. Plotted to break up Xin Xin and Xiao Yi.
Sora Ma	Ruan Feng 阮凤	Vietnamese bride. Met Xiao Yi and nearly married him. Has a dark secret unknown to others. Came back to Singapore and almost married Lin Ru Long. Returns to Vietnam single.
Zhang Wei	Lin Rulong 林如龙	Yanling's father aka Long-ge or Albert. Mingzhu's ex-husband. Flamboyant and flirtatious, hankers after young women. Hope of marrying Ruan Feng.
George Young	James	Overseas professional. Zheng Bang's colleague and tenant. Loves Chinese language and speaks Mandarin.
Joey Feng	Lin Yanling 林艳玲	Xinxin's good friend and colleague.
Silver Ang	Karen	Paul's ex-wife. Xiaoyi's admirer.
Lin Ruping	Mingzhu	Yanling's mother Rulong's ex-wife
Benjamin Heng	Zheng Jianping	Xiaolian's husband.
Hu Wensui		

== Star Awards 2013 nominations ==
Yours Fatefully received three nominations in Show 1 of the Star Awards. The other dramas that were nominated for Best Theme Song were It Takes Two, Don't Stop Believin', Show Hand and Joys of Life.

Nominee / Work	Award	Accolade	Result
《幸福记号》 sung by Olivia Ong	Star Awards 2013 Show 1 红星大奖2013 亮闪八方	Best Theme Song 最佳主题曲	Nominated
Wong Kwok Chung Steve 黃国钟	Star Awards 2013 Show 1 红星大奖2013 亮闪八方	Best Drama Cameraman 最佳戏剧摄影	Nominated
Gao Jun Wei 高俊伟	Star Awards 2013 Show 1 红星大奖2013 亮闪八方	Best Music & Sound Design 最佳音乐与音效设计	Nominated

== International broadcast ==
It was shown in Thailand on Thairath TV beginning on 21 May 2015.

== See also ==
- Yours Fatefully episodes
