= Chloe Wang (Taiwanese actress) =

Taiwanese actress, singer and host

- 王樂妍
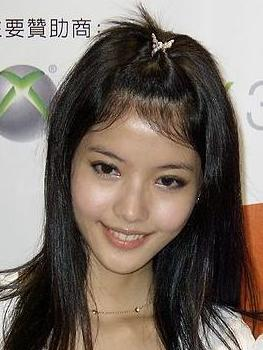
- Born: Cynthia Wang Xin Ru (Chinese: 王心如; pinyin: Wáng Xīnrú); 8 July 1986 (age 40); Taiwan
- Occupations: Actress, singer, host, author
- Years active: 1999–present

Chinese name
- Traditional Chinese: 王樂妍
- Simplified Chinese: 王乐妍
Transcriptions
Standard Mandarin
- Hanyu Pinyin: Wáng Lèyān
- Musical career
- Origin: Taiwan
- Genres: Mandopop
- Instruments: Piano, guitar
- Labels: Universal Music Taiwan, Phoenix Talent

Chloe Wang Le Yan (born 8 July 1986), formerly known as Cynthia Wang Xin Ru, is a Taiwanese actress, singer, and host. She is currently managed by label Universal Music Taiwan and Taiwanese artiste management company Phoenix Talent, which is owned by Taiwanese television station Formosa Television, also better known as FTV.

== Biography ==
Wang made her debut as Cynthia Wang at the age of 13 in 1999, starring in her first television advertisement. Subsequently, she hosted several television shows and appeared in music videos and television commercials.

In 2005, she became part of the Taiwanese girl group Yummy, which disbanded one year later. On 17 July 2009, Wang released her first album, entitled Copenhagen's Fairy Tales (哥本哈根的童话).

Wang rose to fame, especially in Singapore, after starring in MediaCorp Channel 8 dramas Devotion and Joys of Life in 2011 and 2012, respectively. She was nominated as Best Female Character during the Star Awards 2012, and won the online polls for the Best Overseas Artist category in the same year. As a result, she became a favourite in the media.

In 2013, she made her movie debut as the female lead in Lian Hun – Kua Hai Che Ping and took on the leading role in the popular Taiwanese idol drama series IUUI. She changed her name to Chloe Wang in order to boost her career and visibility.

Wang is currently the ambassador for fashion label dENiZEN, along with former UKISS member Alexander Lee. As a cat lover, she is a spokesperson for Stray Cats Protection Association in Taipei.

== Filmography ==
=== Movies ===
Year	Title	Chinese title	Role	Notes
2012	Timeless Love	那个夏天	Nai Nai 奶奶	
2013	The Wedding Diary II	结婚那件事之后	Si Ting 思庭	
2014	Lucy	露西	News anchor	
2014	It Takes Two To Tango	車拼	Chen Xinyi 陳心怡	
2016	Go！Crazy Gangster	風雲高手	Di Huigui 狄慧桂	
2018	Ching's Way Homes	阿青，回家了	Yang's girlfriend	
2019	One Headlight	絕世情歌	Yun Ling	

=== TV shows ===
Year	Title	Role	Notes
2006	Knives@School 高校有刀	Zhao Shanshan 趙姍姍	
2006	Chu, Chu, My Daddy 親親小爸	Zhou Shujie 周舒潔	
2007	I Want To Become A Hard Persimmon 我要變成硬柿子	Du Qiao Qi 杜喬琪	
2008	Mysterious Incredible Terminator 霹靂MIT	Jin Ji La 金吉菈	
2009	Momo Love 桃花小妹	Shi Xue 史雪	
2010	The Gifts 女王不下班	Zhang Ruowei 章若薇	
2010	Love Buffet 愛似百匯	Teng Qiu Ying 藤秋櫻	
2011	33 Story-House 33故事館 - The Runaway Foes 落跑冤家	Ji Fen Ni 季芬妮	
2011	Devotion 阿娣	Lin Shanshan 林珊珊	Nominated - Favourite Female Character (Star Awards 2012)
2012	Joys of Life 花样人间	Han Rourou 韩柔柔	
2013	IUUI 我愛你愛你愛我	Wang Dandan 王丹丹	
2014	Teacher Gangstar 神仙·老師·狗	He Meigui 何玫瑰	
2014	Lovestore at the Corner 巷弄裡的那家書店	Dong Xin Ni 董欣霓	
2014 - 2015	118	Ada	
2015	Aries 星座爱情牡羊女	Xiao Jing 蕭靜	
2016	Nie Xiaoqian 聶小倩	Chen Fang'ai 陳芳愛	
2016	My Teacher is Xiao-he 我的老師叫小賀	He Qiandai 賀千岱	
2018-2021	Girl's Power series 女兵日記女力報到/女力報到系列	Zhang Jiajia 張佳佳	
2022	Life is Beautiful 美麗人生	Wang Lexian 王樂仙	

=== Micro-movies ===
Year	Title	Role	Notes
2014	人海	Herself	

=== TV hosting ===
Year	Title	Notes
2011	Diamond Club 鑽石夜總會	
2011 - 2013	Apple E-News 蘋果娛樂	
2014 - 2015	Game GX 新電玩快打	

== Discography ==
=== With Yummy ===
==== Albums ====
Album	Information	Track list
1st	Yummy: Release date: 25 October 2005; Language: Chinese; Label: Universal Music Taiwan	Track list: 1. Yummy Yummy; 2. 五分熟; 3. I Won't Cry; 4. 分手有鬼; 5. Just Want to 6. 還有夢; 7. 羅密歐與四個茱麗葉; 8. 有你在; 9. 承認; 10. 愛的躲避球; 11. 戀愛季節

=== As solo artist ===
==== Albums ====
Album	Information	Track list
1st	Copenhagen's Fairy Tales 哥本哈根的童話: Release date: 17 July 2009; Language: Chinese; Label: Universal Music Taiwan	Track list: 1. 哥本哈根的童話 (with MC40 of Da Mouth); 2. 非走不可; 3. 到底愛怎麼了; 4. 壞天氣好心情- (with Ge Li Jie Fu 格里杰夫); 5. 愛不休; 6. 原諒; 7. 都是因為你; 8. 五分熟(2009單飛版); 9. 寂寞愛情部落格; 10. 不愛就不愛

== Awards and nominations ==
Year	Award	Category	Result
2012	Star Awards	Favourite Female Character (in Devotion)	Nominated
2012	Star Awards	Best Overseas Artiste	Won
